= Huevos (film series) =

Mexican animated film series

Little Eggs / Huevos films
- Directed by: Gabriel Riva Palacio Alatriste; Rodolfo Riva Palacio Alatriste
- Produced by: See below
- Starring: Bruno Bichir; Angélica Vale; Carlos Espejel; Maite Perroni (since 3); See more below
- Music by: Carlos Zepeda (1 & 2); Zacarías M. de la Riva (since 3)
- Production company: Huevocartoon Producciones
- Distributed by: Videocine; Pantelion Films (3, 4; U.S.)
- Release dates: 2006 (1); 2009 (2); 2015 (3); 2021 (4); 2022 (5)
- Running time: 469 minutes
- Country: Mexico
- Language: Spanish
- Box office: $45.9 million

Little Eggs (released in Latin America as Huevos) is a series of animated films based on the web series of Mexico-based multimedia company Huevocartoon. The first two films, starting with 2006's Una película de huevos, were animated with 2D digitized traditional animation, both of which were major box-office successes in the country. The latter three entries were animated in full computer animation. All films were directed by Huevocartoon creators Gabriel Riva Palacio Alatriste and Rodolfo Riva Palacio Alatriste.

The Huevos series is one of the highest-grossing original film franchise in Mexico with the gross of $44.2 million worldwide and MX$461.7 million pesos within the country, and with the highest amount of viewers in a franchise overall.

Additionally, three of its films are among the top three highest-grossing animated Mexican films of all time, with Un gallo con muchos huevos having the highest-gross, both franchise-wise and overall.

== Films ==
=== Una Película de Huevos (2006) ===
In the first installment, after being snatched by a farmer from his mother hen, newborn egg Toto (Bruno Bichir) must find his way back home to become a baby chicken. Fellow egg Willy (Carlos Espejel) and Tocino ("bacon") join along, as they encounter enemy eggs and hungry animals.

=== Otra Película de Huevos y un Pollo (2009) ===
It follows Toto who has now hatched into a little chick. When a group of eggs kidnap him for his heart, led by an egg stone wizard, Huevo Brujo (Dario T. Pie), his egg friends go out to search and rescue him in the wilderness of the desert as he learns about the life as a chicken.

=== Un gallo con muchos huevos (2015) ===
The first full CG animated entry, Toto is now a grown rooster who summons the courage to battle against a champion rooster fighter, Bankivoide (Sergio Sendel), in effort to save his home from bankruptcy. Along the way, he is trained by a goofball duck egg, Patín Patán (Omar Chaparro), who taught him fighting and non-fighting moves. The film introduces new main characters; Di (Maite Perroni) who is Toto's love interest, Don Poncho (Jose Lavat) who is Di's father, Fidencio who is the family's dog, and La Abuelita (María Alicia Delgado) who is the ranch's owner.

=== Un rescate de huevitos/Little Eggs: An African Rescue (2021) ===
Toto and Di must rescue their newborn egg children, Max and Uly, after Russian thieves steal them for a millionaires' food event in Africa. Together with their egg friends, Willy, Bibi, and Confi, they go on an adventure in the safari with dangerous animal encounters and human battles.

=== Huevitos congelados/Little Eggs: A Frozen Rescue (2022) ===
In the final installment, Toto must return a young polar bear and penguins to their home in the South Pole after making a promise to his mother. He, with his family and friends, must cooperate together and overcome obstacles, while being pursued by the evil circus owners. It was released streaming-only, exclusively through Vix+ on December 14, 2022.

=== Future ===
A spin-off film featuring Confi, a goofball Cascarón character, is reported to be in development. "Confi [was liked] so much that they asked us to do something and we are going to do [something] surreal, absolute madness. Although he is a very nice character, [...] I don't know if only he can be half heavy, so maybe we're going to put a co-star in it or [...] two super crazy morons that fill the story, but here comes the movie," said Gabriel Riva.

== Video game ==
A video game based on the first film was released on 19 April 2010, named Un Juego de Huevos. It was designed and released exclusively for the Zeebo system, a 3G wireless-enabled entertainment and education platform from Zeebo Inc. currently available in Mexico and Brazil.

== Background and setting ==
The films are typically set in Mexico at a chicken ranch, called "Granjas el Pollón". It follows Toto and his egg friends, including Willy, Bibi, and Confi, and Tocino the bacon, going on adventures by safely returning home, rescuing family members and friends, and even protecting their home.

== Animation ==
The film franchise originally used 2D traditional animation with CG elements, created and composed digitally. It later transitioned to full computer animation since Un gallo con muchos huevos.

== Cast and characters ==
=== Characters ===
- Toto (Rolo in English dub of the 3rd film) is a young rooster who is simple-minded. He is sometimes timid, hotheaded, and stubborn, but also proven to be caring, gentle, and courageous. He has two spiky feather hairs on his head with brown ends. In showing leadership, he led armies for the sake of defending and rescuing his friends and family. He is often accompanied with his best friends, Willy, Bibi, Confi (all of which are eggs), and Tocino the mute bacon. He later became soul mates with Di, a white hen, and later married her. They had two children, Max and Uly. Voiced by Bruno Bichir in Spanish, and Zachary Gordon in the English version of Un gallo con muchos huevos.
- Willy is a chicken egg who was part of the egg military and Toto's best friend. When he was four-days old, he met and accompanied Toto and Tocino in a journey to escape the kitchen. He wears a green army helmet and a belt, and has a rounded afro-style hair. He originally wanted to hatch with Toto before changing his mind after meeting his love interest, Bibi. He sometimes gets worried and show a bit of cockiness, but is shown to be mentally-stabled and supportive as well. In Huevitos congelados, it was revealed he initially rejected the idea of having children, despite Bibi's interest. It was then due to their egg nature, and they adopted a cracked penguin egg. Voiced by Carlos Espejel in Spanish, and Garrett Clayton in the English version of Un gallo con muchos huevos.
- Bibi is a beautiful acrobatic egg who was part of a juggler's show at the carnival. A love interest for Willy and one of Toto's friends, she has long, curly brown ponytail and wears a blue cape with star brooches hanging from it. Bibi is later revealed to be spoiled, but was still able to function healthily. She has excellent skills such as acrobatics and roping. She has two brothers, Bebe and Bubi, who only appeared in the first two films. In Huevitos congelados she was interested in having children despite Willy's objection. They eventually adopted a young penguin egg who couldn't hatch. Voiced by Angélica Vale in Spanish, and Olivia Grace in the English version of Un gallo con muchos huevos.
- Confi (Carney in English dub of the 3rd film) is a Cascarón egg who is the most prominent of the eggs who share the same name. Among his people, he's considered some sort of spiritual guide and is often followed by the others in his senseless prayers and speeches. Like traditional confetti eggs, he is painted in bright colors and tipped with a piece of navy blue india paper. He has a goofball personality, and can spit and gas out confetti. Prior to moving in Toto's ranch, he operated a nightclub-like establishment behind the amusement park. He is considered a mascot of the franchise as he appeared in teaser trailers and promotional content for the Huevos films. Voiced by Gabriel Riva Palacio Riva in Spanish, and Jason Mewes in the English version of Un gallo con muchos huevos.
- Di (Dee in English dub of the 3rd film), a beautiful white hen who is Toto's wife. Supportive and caring, she encourages Toto whenever he's in a tough spot. She has a father named Don Poncho, and wears rounded glasses. Originally a soulmate, she later became Toto's wife and gave birth to two children, Max and Uly. Voiced by Maite Perroni in Spanish, and Amber Montana in the English version of Un gallo con muchos huevos.
- Max and Uly are twin sibling children who are playful and caring. First appearing in Un rescate de huevitos, they were originally newborn golden eggs who were later snatched by Russian collectors due to their rich appearance. Despite initial fearing, they demonstrated teamwork and leadership; during the freezer escape and to rescue the reptitle gang. Later, they hatched into chicks and joined their father, Toto, on an adventure to the South Pole. Oliver Flores voiced Max, and Dione Riva Palacio Santacruz voiced Uly.
- Don Poncho (Don Alfonso in English dub of the 3rd film), a former rooster boxer who retired after an embarrassing loss. He is Di's father and later Toto's father-in-law, proven to be a good leader of the farm and loving grandfather to Max and Uly. Like Di, he was very encouraging to Toto, and helped him "find his voice" and mentoring his crowing skills. He was put in charge to babysit Max and Uly, before realizing they snuck away with Toto and family. Voiced by José Lavat in Spanish, and Keith David in the English version of Un gallo con muchos huevos.
- Tocino (Bacon in English), a mute bacon who communicates with body movements and squeak sounds. He has surprising abilities that come in handy during Toto's adventures, such as elastic and rope abilities. The only thing he wears is shoes. While mute in nature, Tocino has spoken during the bloopers of Una Película de Huevos and the second teaser for Un gallo con muchos huevos, both of which Miguel Guerrero voiced him.
- Tlacua and Cuache are a duo of hungry opossums that make many attempts to capture and eat eggs. Originally from the underground, they have shifted their work aboveground. Tlacua is the serious type as he is quick-tempered, sarcastic, and ironic. Cuache, on the other hand, is easy-going, well-intentioned, naïve, witty, and a bit slimy. Both are of Northern heritage, hence their accent style. At one point, they became interested in eating chicken as food in Un gallo con muchos huevos. Ironically, in Un rescate de huevitos, the two dressed as chickens while returning to egg capturing. In Huevitos congelados, they were lost at sea and struggled to find their way back to Mexico. Tlacua is voiced by Fernando Meza - Tlacua, and Rodolfo Riva Palacio Alatriste voiced Cuache in Spanish.
- Coco is a theater-loving and dramatic crocodile egg, and leader of the reptile gang originally sent by the adult reptiles to crush Toto and the chicken eggs. Despite his leadership, he didn't really care about the missions given to him by his father and spent most of his time dreaming of becoming a famous actor. He has big, bulk-like arms tipped with yellowish cuffs and an exaggerated Elvis Presley-style hairdo. He, along with the reptile gang, were later snatched for a food event in Africa. He was originally the antagonist until he, and the gang, switched sides and became Toto's friends. Voiced by Rodolfo Riva Palacio Alatriste.
- Iguano, an iguana egg who's the largest member of the reptile egg gang and Coco's second-in-command. He often carries a club and has messy overgrown hair. Despite his low intelligence, he is very strong and provides good assistance. Voiced by Rodolfo Riva Palacio Alatriste.
- Lagartijo, a noble, yet emotionally-unstable lizard egg who is somewhat neurotic. Having no character on decision-making, he always does what was ordered of him. He is from the coast, and has an Acapulco accent-style. Voiced by Fernando Meza.
- Torti, a turtle egg who has incredibly slow speaking skills but with amazingly strong jaws. He doesn't always affiliate with a specific group, and just follows everyone where they go. He tends to annoy the gang due to his slow movements. He is the only quadrupedal egg in the reptile gang. Voiced by Gabriel Riva Palacio Alatriste.
- Serp is a rattlesnake egg who is cruel, manipulative, and short-tempered. He is a friend of Coco, but becomes self-centered over Coco's authority. Despite his arrogance and ill-tempered behavior, he was shown to be caring as he rescued Max and Uly during a battle on a cargo plane. His rattle tail is surprisingly capable of unlocking locks like a key. Voiced by Gabriel Riva Palacio Alatriste.
- Mamá Gallina (Mama Hen in English) was Toto's loving mother hen and Di's mother-in-law. Colored white, she wore an apron and always believed in her son. Mamá Gallina has gone on her own journey to find Toto when he was snatched after birth. She later died of the avian flu, and had Toto promise her to return a baby polar bear to his home before her death. Voiced by Lourdes Morán in Spanish, and Meredith O'Connor in the English version of Un gallo con muchos huevos.

=== Cast ===
The cast is listed in their original Spanish-language names and original Spanish voice actors.

Characters	Films				
Characters	Una Película de Huevos	Otra Película de Huevos y un Pollo	Un gallo con muchos huevos	Un rescate de huevitos	Huevitos congelados
Toto	Bruno Bichir	Bruno Bichir	Bruno Bichir	Bruno Bichir	Bruno Bichir
Willy	Carlos Espejel	Carlos Espejel	Carlos Espejel	Carlos Espejel	Carlos Espejel
Bibi	Angélica Vale	Angélica Vale	Angélica Vale	Angélica Vale	Angélica Vale
Confi	Gabriel Riva Palacio Alatriste	Gabriel Riva Palacio Alatriste	Gabriel Riva Palacio Alatriste	Gabriel Riva Palacio Alatriste	Gabriel Riva Palacio Alatriste
Di			Maite Perroni	Maite Perroni	Maite Perroni
Tocino	Miguel Guerrero (end credits)	Silent role	Miguel Guerrero (trailer)	Silent role	Silent role
Tlacua	Fernando Meza	Fernando Meza	Fernando Meza	Fernando Meza	Fernando Meza
Cuache	Rodolfo Riva Palacio Alatriste	Rodolfo Riva Palacio Alatriste	Rodolfo Riva Palacio Alatriste	Rodolfo Riva Palacio Alatriste	Rodolfo Riva Palacio Alatriste
Coco	Rodolfo Riva Palacio Alatriste	Rodolfo Riva Palacio Alatriste		Rodolfo Riva Palacio Alatriste	
Iguano	Rodolfo Riva Palacio Alatriste	Rodolfo Riva Palacio Alatriste		Rodolfo Riva Palacio Alatriste	
Lagartijo	Fernando Meza	Fernando Meza		Fernando Meza	
Torti	Gabriel Riva Palacio Alatriste	Gabriel Riva Palacio Alatriste		Gabriel Riva Palacio Alatriste	
Serp	Gabriel Riva Palacio Alatriste	Gabriel Riva Palacio Alatriste		Gabriel Riva Palacio Alatriste	
Mamá Gallina	Lourdes Morán	Lourdes Morán	Lourdes Morán	Lourdes Morán	Lourdes Morán
Manotas		Rodolfo Riva Palacio Alatriste		Rodolfo Riva Palacio Alatriste	
Bebe	Enzo Fortuny	Enzo Fortuny			
Bubi	Mario Filio	Mario Filio			
Huevay II	Humberto Vélez	Humberto Vélez			
Don Poncho			José Lavat (credited as Pepe Lavat in Rescate and Congelados)		
Huevo de Halcón		Patricio Castillo		Armando González	

- A dark grey cell indicates that the character does not appear in the film.

== Crew ==
Film	Director(s)	Producer(s)	Writer(s)	Composer	Editor
Una película de huevos	Gabriel Riva Palacio Alatriste & Rodolfo Riva Palacio Alatriste	Gabriel Riva Palacio Alatriste, Rodolfo Riva Palacio Alatriste, Francisco Arriagada, Raúl Calao, Carlos Zepeda, & Jose Lara	Gabriel Riva Palacio Alatriste & Rodolfo Riva Palacio Alatriste	Carlos Zepeda	Valeria Foster & Leandro Spatz
Otra película de huevos y un pollo	Gabriel Riva Palacio Alatriste & Rodolfo Riva Palacio Alatriste	Paco Arriagada Cuadriello, Carlos Zepeda, Elisa Salinas, & Vance Owen	Rodolfo Riva Palacio Alatriste	Carlos Zepeda	Ignacio Alaniz & Joaquim Martí Marques
Un gallo con muchos huevos	Gabriel Riva Palacio Alatriste & Rodolfo Riva Palacio Alatriste	Ignacio Martínez Casares, Gabriel Riva Palacio Alatriste & Rodolfo Riva Palacio Alatriste	Gabriel Riva Palacio Alatriste & Rodolfo Riva Palacio Alatriste	Zacarías M. de la Riva	Daniel Othón M. Gallardo
Un rescate de huevitos	Gabriel Riva Palacio Alatriste & Rodolfo Riva Palacio Alatriste	Ignacio Martínez Casares, Gabriel Riva Palacio Alatriste & Rodolfo Riva Palacio Alatriste	Gabriel Riva Palacio Alatriste & Rodolfo Riva Palacio Alatriste	Zacarías M. de la Riva	Daniela Rodríguez Balestra, Gabriel Riva Palacio Alatriste, & Rodolfo Riva Palacio Alatriste
Huevitos congelados	Gabriel Riva Palacio Alatriste & Rodolfo Riva Palacio Alatriste	Ignacio Martínez Casares, Gabriel Riva Palacio Alatriste & Rodolfo Riva Palacio Alatriste	Gabriel Riva Palacio Alatriste & Rodolfo Riva Palacio Alatriste	Zacarías M. de la Riva	Gabriel Riva Palacio Alatriste, Rodolfo Riva Palacio Alatriste, Daniela Rodríguez Balestra, & R. Edgardo Ávalos Cuenca

=== Music ===
The first two films were composed by Huevocartoon co-founder and series' executive producer Carlos Zepeda. The following CG entries were then composed by Spanish-born musician Zacarías M. de la Riva, since Un gallo con muchos huevos.

== Reception ==
=== Box office performance ===
Film	Release date	Box office				Budget	Ref.
Film	Release date	Mexico (MXN)	United States	Worldwide total	Audience count	Budget	Ref.
Una Película de Huevos	April 26, 2006	MX$142,347,787	—N/a	$7,144,638	3,994,361	$0.8 million	
Otra Película de Huevos y un Pollo	March 20, 2009	MX$113,588,002	—N/a	$8,583,678	3,095,106	$1.9 million	
Un gallo con muchos huevos	August 20, 2015 (Mexico); September 4, 2015 (U.S.)	MX$167,808,502	$9,080,818	$26,072,723	4,131,013	$5.3 million	
Un rescate de huevitos	August 13, 2021 (Mexico); August 27, 2021 (U.S.)	MX$50,000,000+	$927,154	$4,093,345	900,000		
Total		MX$473,744,291+	$10,007,972	$45,301,039+	12,120,480+	$8 million+	

=== Critical reception ===
Film	Rotten Tomatoes	Tomatazos	Common Sense Media
Un gallo con muchos huevos	69% (16 reviews)	67%	3/5
Un rescate de huevitos	60% (5 reviews)	100%	3/5

== See also ==
- Leyendas (franchise)
- Huevocartoon
- List of highest-grossing Mexican films
- Mexican animation
