= Huevocartoon =

Mexican multimedia entertainment brand

Huevocartoon Producciones
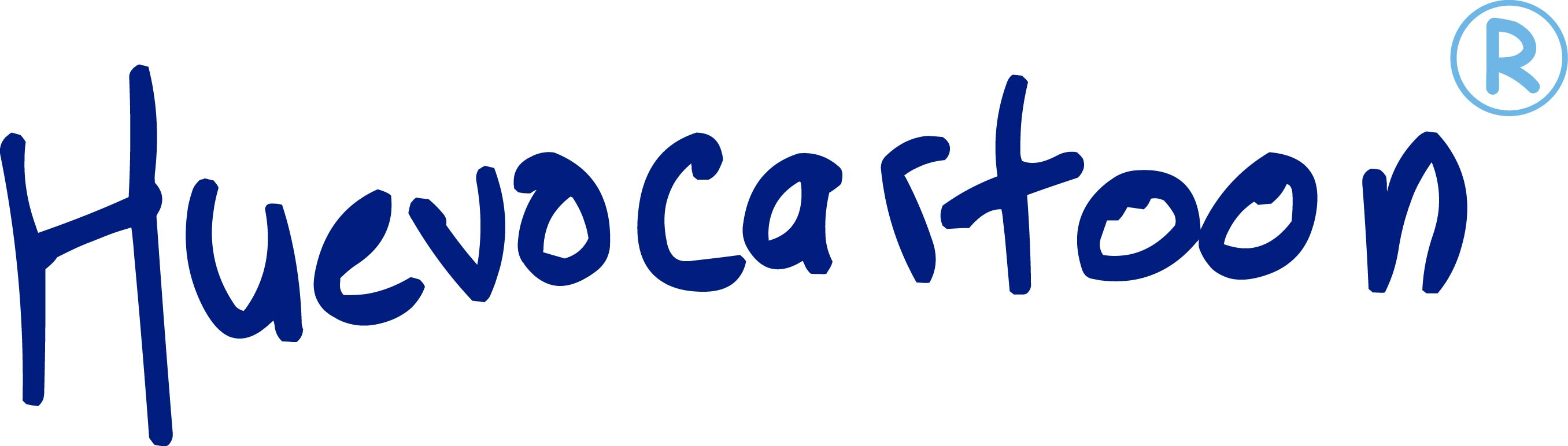
- Type: Private
- Industry: Animation
- Genre: Animation; Entertainment
- Predecessor: La Comunidad Huevo
- Founded: 2001
- Founder: Gabriel Riva Palacio Alatriste; Rodolfo Riva Palacio Alatriste; Carlos Zepeda Chehaibar; Rodolfo Riva Palacio Velasco
- Headquarters: Mexico City, Mexico
- Number of locations: 2
- Area served: Mexico City, Querétaro
- Products: Animated films Television shows YouTube Channels; Web series Marketing
- Production output: Ignacio Martínez Casasares
- Website: huevocartoon.com

Huevocartoon Producciones is a Mexican animation studio and multimedia entertainment company founded in November 2001 by Gabriel and Rodolfo Riva Palacio Alatriste, Carlos Zepeda Chehaibar, and Rodolfo Riva Palacio Velasco. It consists of a web series, six feature films, a video game, a television special, and advertisements, featuring anthropomorphic eggs in a civilized and humorous setting.

== History ==
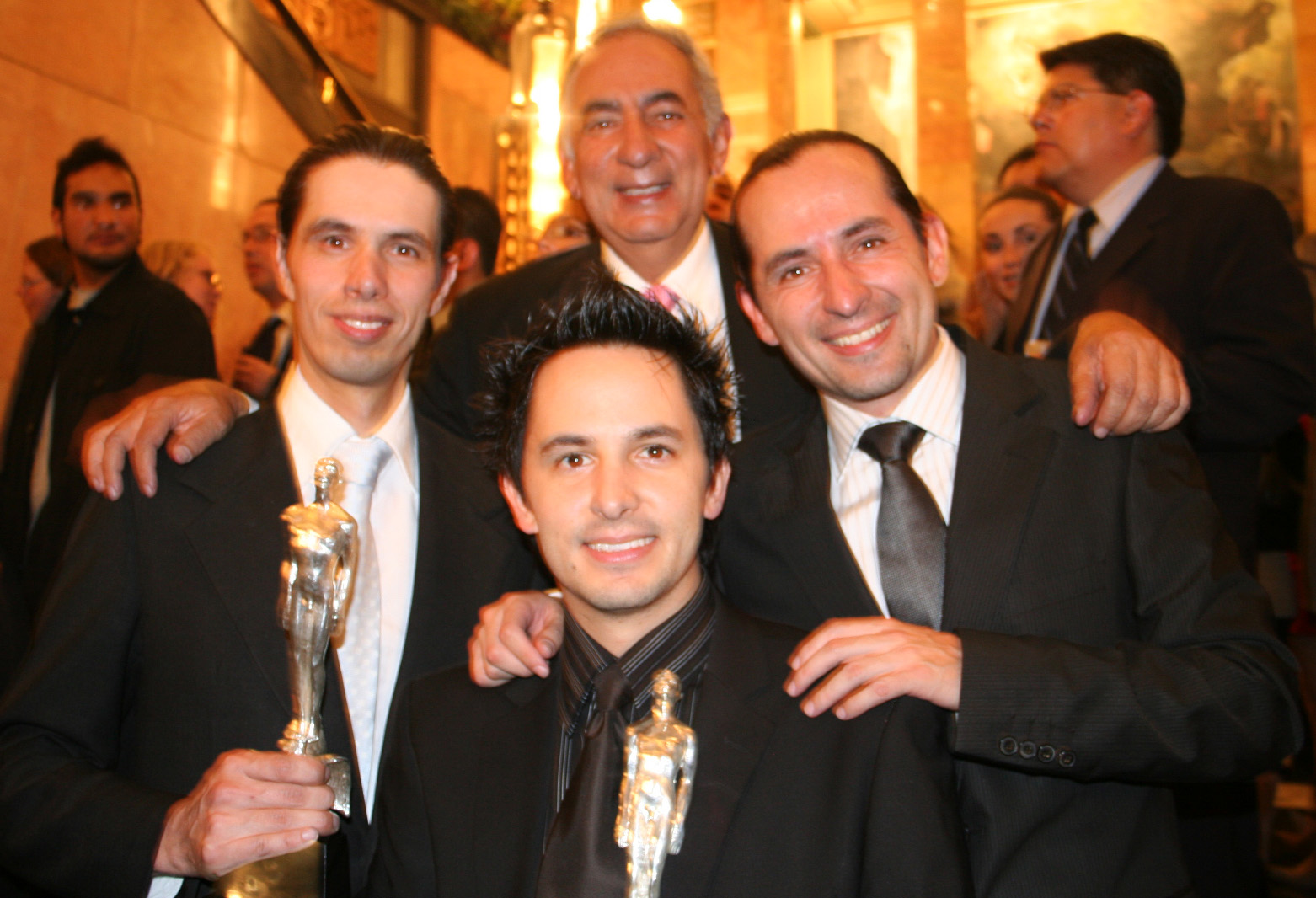
Founders, Gabriel and Rodolfo Riva Palacio, Carlos Zepeda, and Rodolfo Riva Palacio Velascoas, at the 2007 Ariel Awards.

The brand was founded in November 2001 by brothers Gabriel and Rodolfo Riva Palacio Alatriste, Carlos Zepeda Chehaibar, and Rodolfo Riva Palacio Velascoas, as an internet website dedicated to animation, originally called 'La Comunidad Huevo' (Spanish for 'The Egg Community'). The website was officially launched on 6 January 2002. Since then, the website gained 3 million visitors within the first three months of its launch, and at the end of 2004, it was visited 230,000 times daily. Tycoon Enterprises, a marketing investing company, invested in Huevocartoon within six months of the launch after gaining popularity. Hoping to expand into higher-budgeted projects, such as a film and a television series, the company partnered with several marketing companies, including Sabritas, Renault, and Telcel, to include the 'Huevos' characters and brands in their advertisements. Nonetheless, the marketing and licensing campaign helped the company's budget and plans for a film has moved on. The company's first film, Una Película de Huevos (A Film of Eggs), was released in theaters in Mexico on 21 April 2006, becoming a major box-office hit, grossing $142.3 million pesos (est. US$7.6 million). The film later won the Ariel Award (Mexico's equivalent to the Academy Awards) in 2007 for 'Mejor largometraje de animación' ('Best Animated Feature Film'). The second film, Otra Película de Huevos y un Pollo (Another Film of Eggs and a Chicken), was released on 20 March 2009. Despite a weaker performance, it was another box-office success, grossing $113.5 million pesos.

Un gallo con muchos huevos was released in Mexico on 20 August 2015, where it was a major box-office success and holds the record as the highest-grossing Mexican animated film of all time. It grossed $167.8 million pesos (est. US$9 million). Despite being the third film in the franchise the film's 2 predecessors have no English subtitles or dubs and were never released outside Mexico. The film was also released in the United States on 4 September 2015, distributed by Pantelion Films, where it was a surprise box-office success. The release thrilled the filmmakers, to which co-director Gabriel Riva called it "a dream come true", as it had been their goal to release a film in the U.S. from the beginning of the company's foundation. Neither of its predecessors were released in the United States in any major format due to their controversial and edgy content, failing to match the humor code within the American animation film industry.

The company's fourth film, Marcianos vs. Mexicanos, was released on 9 March 2018. Unlike its past feature productions, Marcianos has an original concept and features an entirely human cast. Additionally, the film is aimed for an adult audience. The film features the voices of Adal Ramones, Martha Higareda, Omar Chaparro, Angélica Vale and Eduardo Manzano. However, unlike their previous films, it received negative reviews and was a box-office disappointment.

Un rescate de huevitos was released on 12 August 2021, in Mexico. The original voice cast reprised their roles as they're joined by newcomers including Jesús Ochoa, Mauricio Barrientos, Mara Escalante, Freddy Ortega, and Germán Ortega. It was later released in the United States on 27 August 2021, by Pantelion Films.

Huevitos congelados, the final film in the Huevos film series, was released on streaming as a Vix+ original. In addition to returning voice actors, new comers include Miguel Rodarte, Arath de la Torre, Mauricio Castillo, and Vadhir Derbez.

Rock Bottom (Gungo y los juegos cavernícolas in Spanish), a co-production with Spain's 3Doubles Producciones, was released on September 3, 2026, and features the voices of Ricky Limón, Karen Torres, Joaquín Cosío, and Daniel Sosa. The English voice cast includes Rob Schneider and Gabriel Iglesias. It is expected to be completed by 2026.

It was announced that the studio was developing the animated feature Alebrijes, produced by Aron Warner. It is currently unknown of the state, presumably canceled.

Other upcoming films include horror-comedy Grimalkin, a Huevos spin-off film focused on Confi, and a live-action remake of Una película de huevos.

== Huevocartoon Entertainment ==
Huevocartoon Entertainment (formerly "Huevocartoon Producciones") is the production label of the company. It is best known for producing films based on the "Huevos" characters from the internet shorts. It spawned into a massively-successful film series, known as Huevos.

Many of the films have performed commercially well, three of which earning over $100 million pesos.

=== Films ===
#	Title	Release date	Budget	Gross (MXN)	Gross (USD)
1	Una Película de Huevos	April 21, 2006	$0.8 million	MX$142.3 million	$7.8 million
2	Otra Película de Huevos y un Pollo	March 20, 2009	$1.9 million	MX$113.58 million	$8.6 million
3	Un gallo con muchos huevos	August 20, 2015 (Mexico); September 4, 2015 (U.S.)	$5.3 million	MX$167.8 million	$25.6 million
4	Marcianos vs. Mexicanos	March 9, 2018		MX$26.1 million	$1.18 million
5	Un rescate de huevitos	August 12, 2021 (Mexico); August 27, 2021 (U.S.)	$1.15 million	MX$50 million	$4.52 million
6	Huevitos congelados	December 14, 2022 (Vix+)		—N/a	$1.02 million
7	Gungo y los juegos cavernícolas (co-production with 3Doubles Producciones)	September 3, 2026		MX$5.4 million	$0.39 million

=== Compilation ===
#	Title	Release date	Budget	Gross (MXN)	Gross (USD)
1	Huevos en Corto!: Las Animaciones Clásicas al Cine	September 3, 2010	—N/a	$0.68 million	—N/a

=== In development ===
Title	Ref(s)
Grimalkin	
El Viaje de Confi	
Una Película de Huevos (Live-action)	

=== Television ===
Title	Premiere date	End date	Network
Huevo Kids	January 11, 2011	2011	—N/a
Fábrica de Huevos	April 5, 2013	present	TV Azteca
Los Reyes de la Colonia se Van al Mundial	2014		—N/a
The Huevocartoon Late Night Show	October 11, 2018	present	—N/a
Los Lopeggs	June 17, 2021	Present	Pantaya (2021-2022); ViX (2022-present)
Lolo y Pau	November 23, 2021	Present	Pantaya (2021-2022); ViX (2022-present)
El Chapulín y los Colorado (in co-production with THR3 Media Group and Telefilms)	January 1, 2026	present	Cartoon Network; HBO Max

=== Video Games ===
Title	Release date	Ref(s)
Un Juego de Huevos	19 April 2010	

=== Frequent and recurring collaborates ===
In addition to the Riva brothers, Gabriel and Rodolfo, taking part in voicing aside of directing, producing, and writing, each film produced by Huevocartoon features the voice of famous Mexican talent, including Bruno Bichir, Carlos Espejel, and Angélica Vale, as well as some recognizable voice-over artists known for Spanish-dubbing in cartoons, such as Humberto Vélez and Rubén Moya. In the crew department, Spanish composer, Zacarías M. de la Riva composed music for Un gallo con muchos huevos, Un rescate de huevitos and Un gallo congelado. Amado López and Javier Calderón composed music for Marcianos vs. Mexicanos. Paco Arriagada co-produced the first two films. Ignacio Casares produced the other two films including Marcianos. The following consists of the list of actors and actresses who have provided voice work in two or more films. People who have single roles aren't included (see below).

Actor/actress	Una Película de Huevos (2006)	Otra Película de Huevos y un Pollo (2009)	Un gallo con muchos huevos (2015)	Marcianos vs. Mexicanos (2018)	Un rescate de huevitos (2021)	Huevitos congelados (2022)
Bruno Bichir	Yes	Yes	Yes	No	Yes	Yes
Maite Perroni	No	No	Yes	No	Yes	Yes
Carlos Espejel	Yes	Yes	Yes	No	Yes	Yes
Angélica Vale	Yes	Yes	Yes	Yes	Yes	Yes
Omar Chaparro	No	No	Yes	Yes	No	No
Humberto Vélez	Yes	Yes	Yes	Yes	Yes	Yes
Gabriel Riva Palacio	Yes	Yes	Yes	Yes	Yes	Yes
Rodolfo Riva Palacio	Yes	Yes	Yes	Yes	Yes	Yes
Fernando Meza (†)	Yes	Yes	Yes	Yes	Yes	Yes
Rubén Moya	Yes	Yes	Yes	No	Yes	Yes
Mario Filio	Yes	Yes	Yes	Yes	No	No
Juan Frese	No	No	Yes	No	No	Yes
José Lavat (†)	No	No	Yes	No	Yes	Yes
Lourdes Morán (†)	Yes	Yes	Yes	No	Yes	Yes
María Alicia Delgado	No	No	Yes	No	Yes	Yes
Cláudio Herrera	No	No	Yes	No	Yes	Yes
Gaby Torres	Yes	Yes	No	No	No	No
Enzo Fortuny	Yes	Yes	No	No	No	No
Carlos Cobos	Yes	Yes	No	No	No	No
Paco Arriagada	Yes	Yes	No	No	No	No
Mónica Santacruz	No	No	No	Yes	Yes	Yes

=== Single-film collaborates ===
The following consists of a list of actors and actresses who have provided voice-overs to a character in at least one film. Only those who have notable roles are included.

Actor/actress	Una Película de Huevos (2006)	Otra Película de Huevos y un Pollo (2009)	Un gallo con muchos huevos (2015)	Marcianos vs. Mexicanos (2018)	Un rescate de huevitos (2021)	Huevitos congelados (2022)
Miguel Guerrero	Yes	No	No	No	No	No
Darío T. Pie	No	Yes	No	No	No	No
Lucila Mariscal	No	Yes	No	No	No	No
Patricio Castillo	No	Yes	No	No	No	No
Armando González	No	Yes	No	No	No	No
Olga Fernández	No	Yes	No	No	No	No
Sergio Sendel	No	No	Yes	No	No	No
Facundo	No	No	Yes	No	No	No
Ninel Conde	No	No	Yes	No	No	No
Humberto Vélez Jr.	No	No	Yes	No	No	No
Paco González	No	No	Yes	No	No	No
Adal Ramones	No	No	No	Yes	No	No
Martha Higareda	No	No	No	Yes	No	No
Eduardo Manzano	No	No	No	Yes	No	No
Jaime Maussan	No	No	No	Yes	No	No
Jesús Ochoa	No	No	No	No	Yes	No
Mauricio Barrientos	No	No	No	No	Yes	No
Mara Escalante	No	No	No	No	Yes	No
Freddy Ortega	No	No	No	No	Yes	No
Germán Ortega	No	No	No	No	Yes	No
Miguel Rodarte	No	No	No	No	No	Yes
Arath de la Torre	No	No	No	No	No	Yes
Mauricio Castillo	No	No	No	No	No	Yes
Vadhir Derbez	No	No	No	No	No	Yes

== Web series ==
Huevocartoon
- Also known as: HuevocartoonTV
- Genre: Sketch comedy Off-color humor Adult animation Suspense; Satire; Slapstick; Surreal comedy
- Created by: Gabriel and Rodolfo Riva Palacio Alatriste; Carlos Zepeda Chehaibar; Rodolfo Riva Palacio Velasco
- Written by: Rodolfo Riva Palacio Alatriste
- Directed by: Gabriel and Rodolfo Riva Palacio Alatriste
- Voices of: Gabriel and Rodolfo Riva Palacio Alatriste; Fernando Meza; Armando González
- Composer: Carlos Zepeda
- Country of origin: Mexico
- Original languages: Spanish; English

Production
- Executive producers: Gabriel and Rodolfo Riva Palacio Alatriste; Carlos Zepeda Chehaibar; Rodolfo Riva Palacio Velasco
- Production company: Huevocartoon Producciones

Original release
- Network: YouTube (2007–present)
- Release: 2002 – present

Huevocartoon (Spanish for Eggcartoon; also known as HuevocartoonTV) is a Mexican adult animated web series created by Gabriel Riva Palacio Alatriste, Rodolfo Riva Palacio Alatriste, Carlos Zepeda Chehaibar, and Rodolfo Riva Palacio Velasco. Its content typically features characters portrayed as civilized eggs, set in a humorous setting which focuses on politics, socialization, and culture.

Much of the content is "raunchy", "edgy", and primarily aimed for a teen-to-adult audience, to which co-creator Gabriel Riva Palacio Alatriste calls it a "latino South Park".

All the episodes are written, directed, and voiced by brothers, Gabriel and Rodolfo Riva Palacio Alatriste, and produced by Huevocartoon Entertainment.

The original YouTube channel was created in 2007, which has gained over 2 million subscribers. Later, the company launched a new YouTube channel in 2014, named HuevocartoonTV, designed specifically for an English-language audience.

A new season premiered in May 2023, titled "Season 2023", with new and returning characters.

=== Segments ===
- Poeta Huevos (Shakespearean Eggs): A parody of William Shakespeare, the sketch follows three eggs dressed in a medieval-like attire, Ferdinand, Rododendro, and Gabrelle, as they attempt to recite a poetry to the audience in several cuts, while become increasingly drunk due to consuming alcohol.
- Huevos Rancheros (The Ranchero Eggs): Inspired by the Mexican dish of the same name, the sketch focuses on two ranchero-like eggs, named Chema and Chava. The eggs are portrayed homosexual in nature.
- Tenorio e Inés (Romegg and Juliegg): In a parody of Don Juan Tenorio by José Zorrilla, Tenorio the egg tries to recite a poet to Inés, an insensitive and rude egg who frequently interrupts Ternorio's poets.
- Huevo Filósofo (Egg Philosopher): The Huevo Filósofo, who is sometimes referred as the "Easter Egg", is a psychedelic, clueless, and friendly hippie-like egg. He often enjoys smoking marijuana, and is very talkative, haughty, and ridiculous. He often calls everyone "carnal".
- Huevo Zen (Zen Master Egg): The sketch is about an egg with a karate gear who tries to teach martial arts and meditation with his young lemon companion, Lee-Mong-Shu-Pao.
- Huevos Bongó (Bongo Eggs): Two Cuban-origin eggs are a bongo duo who start a conversation and then transform the talk into a Caribbean song using their bongo drums.
- El Huevasesino (The Egg Assassin): An egg within the horror figures, such as Saw, Friday the 13th, The Ring, It, etc., was considered a villain at first. In the end, however, he reveals his true friendly nature and wants to make friends, but is resulted in being killed, insulted, and ignored. He wears a hockey mask and carries a large knife, in parody of Jason Voorhees.
- Los Super Huevos (The Super Eggs) - They are a group of superheroes who make up "the Egg of Justice ", parodying the Justice League.
- El Huevo Santa (Santa Egg) - Being a parody of Santa Claus, the Huevo Santa is a bitter and serious egg that gives bad gifts of low cost to the children because, according to him, they never behave well. He's never been in the chimney when he delivers gifts. In his workshop, his helper elves don't work. He only has a hungry-looking reindeer: Rudolph.
- Dr. Frankendemente y Eggor (Dr. Frankenegg and Eggor) - In a parody of Frankenstein. Dr. Frankendemente and his assistant Eggor will try to build the Monster Egg to scare people away, but there will always be something missing, and everything will go wrong because of Eggor.
- Huevitos en el Espacio (Eggs in Space) - A space crew that has the mission to travel on their spacecraft to discover new hidden objects or fight with enemies in a comic way, in parody of Star Trek.

=== Reception ===
The web series has gained 3 million viewers on the first day of its launch. To date, the videos have gained a total of 594.2 million views, according to the company's website.

== See also ==
- Ánima
- Animex Producciones
