= Un rescate de huevitos =

Little Eggs: An African Rescue
- Theatrical release poster
- Directed by: Gabriel Riva Palacio Alatriste; Rodolfo Riva Palacio Alatriste
- Written by: Gabriel Riva Palacio Alatriste; Rodolfo Riva Palacio Alatriste
- Produced by: Ignacio Martínez Casares; Gabriel Riva Palacio Alatriste; Rodolfo Riva Palacio Alatriste
- Starring: Bruno Bichir; Maite Perroni; Carlos Espejel; Angélica Vale; Jesús Ochoa; Mauricio Barrientos; Mara Escalante; Freddy Ortega; Germán Ortega
- Edited by: Danela Balestra; Gabriel Riva Palacio Alatriste; Rodolfo Riva Palacio Alatriste
- Music by: Zacarías M. de la Riva
- Production company: Huevocartoon Producciones
- Distributed by: Videocine (Mexico); Odin's Eye Entertainment (Worldwide sales)
- Release date: 8 August 2021 (Mexico)
- Running time: 89 minutes
- Country: Mexico
- Language: Spanish
- Budget: $1.15 million
- Box office: $4.52 million

Little Eggs: An African Rescue (released in Mexico, Latin America and the United States as Un Rescate de Huevitos; formerly Huevitos en fuga) is a 2021 Mexican animated adventure comedy film produced by Huevocartoon Producciones. It is a sequel to Un Gallo con Muchos Huevos (2015). The Spanish voice cast returned to reprise their respective roles, joined by new cast members including Jesús Ochoa, Mauricio Barrientos, Mara Escalante, and comedian duo Freddy and Germán Ortega.

The fourth film in the Huevos franchise, as well the second CG installment following the third film and a soft reboot, it was released in Mexico on August 12, 2021. It was followed by a limited theatrical release in the United States a few weeks later on August 27, 2021 by Pantelion Films.

Upon its release, the film received acclaim, with praise towards the animation and positive messages, with many favorable comparisons to DreamWorks Animation. It grossed $50 million pesos (US$2.43 million) in its theatrical run in Mexico.

== Plot ==
Sometime after the events of the third film, on a peaceful morning at the "Granjas el Pollon", Toto is starting his morning routine when Tocino informs him that Di has given birth to their new eggs, Max and Uly. Their golden appearance leads La Abuelita to submit them for a ranch contest, catching the attention of La Duchess, a Russian egg collector. At first, Toto is excited until the children express desire to play in the outdoors, causing Toto to worry and immediately become over protective. He eventually allows them to play under Bibi's supervision, but uses many protective procedures along the way. Just then, two opossums Tlacua and Cuache, disguised as chickens, sneak into the farm in an attempt to eat chickens when Perro Fidencio locks them up in an empty farmhouse. This causes more concern for Toto, but after Di's advice, he promises his children playtime after the contest.

The following day, Max and Uly are declared winners at the egg contest for their golden appearance, as Duquesa offers Abuelita $200 dollars but refuses and pays her back instead. Outraged, she orders the two bandit brothers, Panzovich and Gordimitri to track the "Granjas el Pollon" farm. Meanwhile, on the way home, Toto once again becomes worried for his children after Duquesa's encounter and tears up their winning ribbons, making them afraid of him. Later that night, the remorseful Toto sits by the pond when the Russian collectors send hunting moles in mind-controlled helmets to track and kidnap Max and Uly. Bibi and Willy track down one of the moles, named Toporocho, who thanks them for freeing him from the helmet. In return, he helps Toto and his family board the cargo plane to Congo. They track the plane down and board inside.

Inside the plane, the egg children meet a variety of fellow-snatched eggs inside named jars, including those of a peacock, a Golden eagle, a parrot, a roadrunner, a quail, and returning characters including Coco, Iguano, Serp, Torti, Lagartijo, Manotas, and Huevo de Halcón. Toto and company then make it into the cargo room when a fight between the bandit brothers breaks out. Toto and Di were eventually thrown off the plane, and Willy, Bibi, Bacon, and Toporocho saved them with a parachute. As Duquesa and the bandit brothers drive off, Toto and his company were underground, splashed to river where a trio of hippopotamus give them a ride.

Upon arrival at Barón's mansion, Duquesa presented Max and Uly to the Master Chef, which he ordered all the eggs be refrigerated for two days. After introducing themselves to one another, the eggs get into an argument when Max and Uly, thanks to Di's loosening of their jar, freed them all. They then find a way to control the temperature, at which Manotas only lowered it further. This led to Serp being used to open the lock with his rattle.

Meanwhile, as Toto's group were riding on the hippopotamus, two monkeys take them to a talent show audition. Back at Barón's mansion, the escaping eggs finally unlocked the cage and the roadrunner egg raised the temperature up again. Afterwards, the eggs make up a plan to hide as plant rocks. At the talent show, many performing animals led by the lion king "Leonidas I". Toto dressed as a clown, and Di were locked up in cages before the next performance. Toto was downed when Di encouraged him to perform and stand up to Leonidas.

Barón Roncovich later arrived at his mansion, and the Master Chef's crew take the plants to the dining hall where Duquesa hosted a dinner auction. The Chef's crew later discover the eggs' disappearance; however, he found them on the plants they were hiding and ordered the crew to gather them. Just then, Toto and his crew, along with animals he recruited, battle against the guests and the bandits. After claiming victory and rescuing the eggs, Toto and Di were finally reunited with Max and Uly, where Toto apologized to his children for the ribbon incident. Suddenly, a huge gas leak-triggered fire broke out and Toto and Di managed to escape alive with their eggs.

They board on a plane back home after bidding goodbye to their animal friends. However, Duquesa found her way inside and locked all the doors, in attempt to steal back the eggs for her own plans. An idea came to Max and Uly and they tried to enter the cargo room when Toto briefly held them back before agreeing to trust them. As they fought back against Duquesa, Huevo de Águila Real hatched into a newborn eagle and sent her flying out of the plane with a parachute. Following another victory, the entire crew sang and danced. Meanwhile, Duquesa complained about studying as she landed at a river. Toto's family and friends finally made it back with Max and Uly to the "Granjas", continuing the dance party as the roadrunner egg ends the film.

In the mid-credits scene, Tlacua and Cuache were paddling from inside their cage when they fall down a waterfall.

== Voice cast ==
Spanish cast

- Bruno Bichir as Toto, a rooster and Di's husband and Willy's best friend. He becomes overprotective over the safety of his new children, Max and Uly, but learns how to be a real father through advice, experience, and adventure.
- Maite Perroni as Di, Toto's supportive wife, and Bibi's best friend. She helps Toto with advice in caring for their newborn egg children. She goes along with Toto and their egg friends to save their children.
- Carlos Espejel as Willy, a chicken egg and ex-sergeant who is Toto's best friend and Bibi's boyfriend.
- Angélica Vale as Bibi, a chicken egg and Willy's girlfriend and one of Toto's friends.
- Mayra Rojas as La Duchess, a leader of the Russian egg collector for Africa's food event.
- Oliver Flores as Max, a newborn golden egg who is Uly's twin brother and Toto and Di's son.
- Dione Riva Palacio Santacruz as Uly, a newborn golden egg. She's Max' twin sister and Toto and Di's daughter.
- Ariel Miramontes as Master Chef
- Héctor Lee as Panzovich
- Juan Frese as Gordimitri
- Jesús Ochoa as Rey León "Leonidas I", a wise lion that rules the jungle.
- Freddy Ortega and Germán Ortega as El Chango Bananero and El Chango Petacón, two dim-witted vervet monkeys who acts as a comic reliefs.
- Humberto Vélez as Barón Roncovich
- Claudio Herrera as:
  - Toporocho, a mole who helped Toto and his friends to find their children after being freed by Willy and Bibi from a mind-controlling helmet.
  - Herrera also voiced El Presentador.
- Gabriel Riva Palacio as:
  - Confi, a Cascarón goofball egg.
  - Torti, a slow-speaking turtle egg.
  - Serp, a short-tempered rattlesnake egg.
- Rodolfo Riva Palacio as:
  - Coco, a crocodile egg.
  - Cuache, an easy-going opossum.
  - Don Fidencio, the ranch's blind Bloodhound.
  - Iguano, an iguana egg and Coco's second-in-command.
- Mauricio Barrientos as El Huevo de Águila Real, a sophisticated but hearty Golden eagle egg who is among the eggs captured. He later hatches and becomes a newborn eagle.
- Mónica Santacruz as Pavi, a pretty peacock egg.
- Ximena de Anda as Huevo de Codorniz, a famine quail egg.
- Pepe Lavat as Don Poncho, Di's father, Toto's father-in-law, and Max and Uly's grandfather. Lavat, along with Morán, were later dedicated in memory at the end credits.
- Lulú Morán as Mama Gallina, Toto's mother hen. Morán, along with Lavat, were dedicated in memory at the end credits.
- Rubén Moya as Gorilla Host.
- María Alicia Delgado as Abuelita Guadalupe, an elderly woman who is the owner of the "Granjas el Pollon" farm.

English Cast

- Ricco Fajardo as Toto
- Felicia Angele as Di
- Zeno Robinson as Willy
- Paula Barros as Bibi
- Romulo Bernal as Confi
- Kyle Phillips as Torti
- Romulo Bernal as Serp
- Dana Spejh as Uly
- Hoku Ramirez as Max
- Wayne LeGette as Don Pochino
- Ann Marie Olsen as Mamá Gallina
- Alex Teixeira as León Leonidas
- Michaela Jill Murphy as Pavi
- Juan Felipe Sierra as Iguano

None of the actors from the English dubbing of the previous film reprise any of the characters.

== Production ==
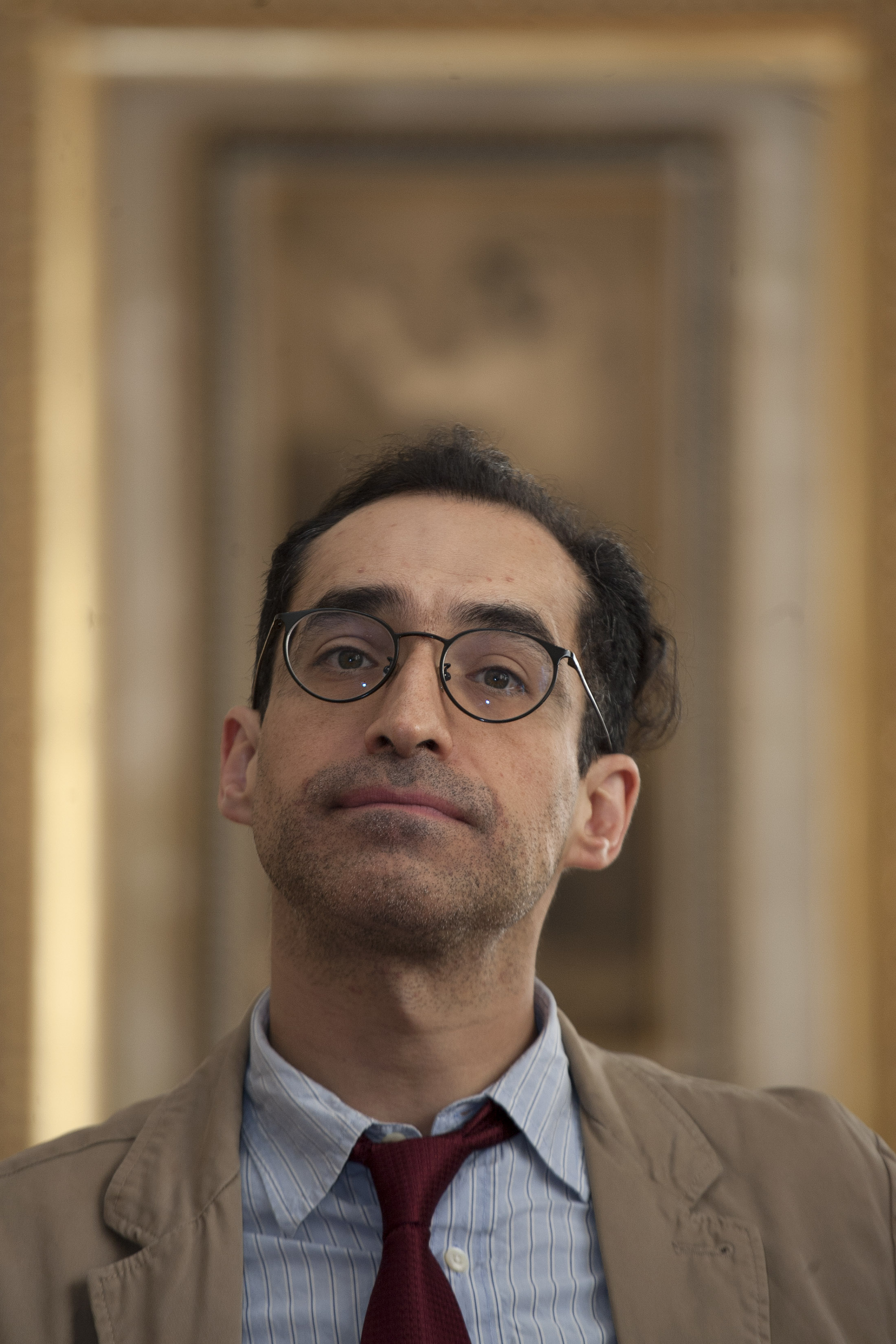
Bruno Bichir voiced Toto since Una película de huevos.

The film utilized full computer-generated imagery animation for the second time, following Un gallo con muchos huevos with about an expected overall increase of fifteen percent of image quality up to the fifth installment, which was in development at the time. Like Un gallo, while being produced in Mexico, the film is intended for an international outreach. "We wanted to make this film very international, without losing the Mexican identity. It has jokes and positive messages," said co-producer Ignacio Casares. The film has been in development during the COVID-19 pandemic in which many crew members, around 80 people, were working remotely from their homes. A total of 350 people from all departments have worked on the film, with an average worktime taking one month per minute. The subscription television service Sky alongside the national film fund of Mexico Eficine and food industries Grupo Herdez and Dulces Miguelito sponsored the film. The animation for the film was handled in Autodesk Maya, modelling in ZBrush and both compositing and render in Houdini.

The film's overprotective theme for Toto's father character came from co-director Rodolfo Riva Palacio Alatriste's own parenting experience with his daughter, Dione, who voiced Uli in the film. Rodolfo also explained that the theme of collecting eggs and endangered animal species for expensive food served as the basis for the screenplay, after he and his brother Gabriel read articles on the topic.

=== Casting ===
Before the animation process, much of the actors had recorded their lines for adaptation. With the film being the last role of Pepe Lavat, who died in 2018.

=== Music ===
Zacarías M. de la Riva, a Spanish composer who previously worked on Un gallo con muchos huevos, has returned to compose this film with a 75-piece orchestra performance in Bratislava.

As with Un gallo, Zacarías has faced challenges in composing music in animated films, as it required the balancing of adventure, drama and comedy. Despite this, he called it "a great joy" and "truly [marvelous] to [be working] again with directors Gabriel and Rodolfo Riva-Palacio." The composer added that the film reused some music pieces from his work in Un gallo.

==== Soundtrack ====
The film's score soundtrack album was released digitally by MovieScore Media on August 13, 2021.

Un rescate de huevitos (Original Motion Picture Soundtrack)

Film score by Zacarías M. de la Riva
- Released: August 13, 2021
- Genre: Film score
- Label: MovieScore Media

Zacarías M. de la Riva chronology
Superagente Makey (Banda Sonora Original de la Película) (2020)	Un rescate de huevitos (Original Motion Picture Soundtrack) (2021)

Un rescate de huevitos (Original Motion Picture Soundtrack)
No.	Title	Length
1.	"The Farm"	2:07
2.	"Max and Uli"	1:55
3.	"The Russians"	2:27
4.	"Toto Breaks Medals and the Attack of the Moles"	3:14
5.	"Chucho and Granny"	2:05
6.	"Flight to Africa"	2:10
7.	"Little Eggs"	1:53
8.	"On the Plane"	3:02
9.	"This Is Africa"	2:47
10.	"The Duchess"	1:38
11.	"Hipo Swallows Toto"	1:26
12.	"In the Fridge"	3:00
13.	"River and Monkeys"	2:17
14.	"Trying to Escape"	2:16
15.	"Rooster Against Lion"	3:01
16.	"Believe the Impossible"	3:09
17.	"Animals Arrive"	2:09
18.	"Smell of Gas"	3:09
19.	"Toto and Friends"	1:27
20.	"Final Attack"	4:53

== Release ==
The film was originally planned for a 2019 release in Mexico, and then August 2020, but has been postponed due to the ongoing COVID-19 pandemic. The film's first poster was released in March 2020, followed by teaser trailer was released on 10 April later that year.

It was officially released in theaters in Mexico on 12 August 2021. Co-director and co-writer Rodolfo Riva Palacio Alatriste told an interviewer at M2 that being able to make four films is a "surprise", reflecting on the release of the franchise's first film released in 2006.

The film was later released in the United States in limited release on 27 August 2021 through Pantelion Films. The film's directors Gabriel and Rodolfo Riva have expressed that they will "compete against the United States" and are "capable". The film was dedicated in memory of voice actors Pepe Lavat and Lulu Morán, who died in 2018 and 2019 respectively.

Internationally, the film was released as Little Eggs: An African Rescue.

== Reception ==
=== Critical reception ===
The film opened mixed to favorable reviews in Mexico, with many praising its improving animation, humor, faithfulness to the franchise, and its messages. On Tomatazos, it has a 100% rating of positive critic reviews. Meanwhile, the film has a score of 60% "Fresh" on Rotten Tomatoes, based on 5 reviews.

Monique Jones of Common Sense Media rated the film 3 out of 5 stars, praising the film's story and themes behind it, calling it "well made", while divided over its humor.

Cath Clarke of The Guardian rated the film 1 out of 5 stars, calling it "a dismal film full of garish visuals and unfunny gags".

=== Box office ===
Upon its release in Mexico, the film debuted in #3 at the box-office, grossing around MX$15 million (US$0.75 million) with an audience count of 239,400. In its second weekend, it dropped to the #4 position, earning an additional MX$8.6 million (US$0.4 million) and 147,600 audience count. Its ticket sales have made the Huevos franchise Mexico's highest-viewed film series in the national industry, surpassing the numbers of the No Manches Frida films with 11.75 million at the time. The film remained successful at its third weekend, grossing MX$5.6 million (US$0.28 million) at its #5 position and 100,200 viewers. In September, the film earned MX$3.4 million with 60,600 audiences, remaining at #4. On its fifth weekend, the film grossed MX$2.5 million pesos (US$0.12 million) with an audience count of 43,900. On its sixth, it has grossed MX$1.1 million pesos (US$0.05 million) at the #10 place, with an audience count of 41,200. To date, it has grossed MX$50 million pesos ($2.43 million) and had an audience count of over 900,000.

In the United States, the film has grossed $430,000 on its opening weekend with an average gross of $1,300 per screening in 320 locations at the time.

=== Awards and nominations ===
Year	Award	Category	Nominees	Result
2021	17th Premios Canacine	Mejor Película de Animación	Gabriel Riva Palacio Alatriste; Rodolfo Riva Palacio Alatriste	Won
2022	64th Ariel Awards	Mejor Largometraje de Animación	Gabriel Riva Palacio Alatriste; Rodolfo Riva Palacio Alatriste	Won

== Sequel ==
A fifth and final installment, titled Huevitos congelados, was released on December 14, 2022 on Vix+.

== See also ==
- Una película de huevos
- Otra película de huevos y un pollo
- Un gallo con muchos huevos
- Marcianos vs. Mexicanos
