= Un gallo con muchos huevos =

Un Gallo Con Muchos Huevos
- Theatrical release poster
- Directed by: Gabriel Riva Palacio Alatriste; Rodolfo Riva Palacio Alatriste; Melanie Simka (U.S. version)
- Written by: Gabriel Riva Palacio Alatriste; Rodolfo Riva Palacio Alatriste
- Produced by: Ignacio Casares; Gabriel Riva Palacio Alatriste; Rodolfo Riva Palacio Alatriste
- Starring: Bruno Bichir; Carlos Espejel; Angélica Vale; Omar Chaparro; Maite Perroni; Sergio Sendel; Ninel Conde; Facundo
- Music by: Zacarías M. de la Riva
- Production companies: Huevocartoon Producciones; Simka Entertainment
- Distributed by: Videocine
- Release date: 20 August 2015
- Running time: 98 minutes
- Country: Mexico
- Language: Spanish
- Budget: $5.3 million
- Box office: $26 million

Un Gallo con Muchos Huevos, released in the United States as Huevos: Little Rooster's Egg-cellent Adventure, is a 2015 animated comedy film produced by Huevocartoon Producciones. It is the sequel to Otra Pelicula de Huevos y un Pollo (2009), and the third film in the Huevos film franchise, as well as being the first CG film and a soft reboot, it is written, produced, and directed by Huevocartoon alumni Gabriel Riva Palacio Alatriste and Rodolfo Riva Palacio Alatriste.

The original Spanish version features the voices of Bruno Bichir, Maite Perroni, Omar Chaparro, Ninel Conde, Carlos Espejel, Sergio Sendel, and television host Facundo.

The film was released on 20 August 2015 in Mexico in 2D and 3D cinemas, where it became a major commercial success and grossed $167.8 million pesos during its theatrical run in the country. The film was the highest-grossing animated film produced in Mexico until 2026 when surpassed by Ánima's La venganza del Charro Negro, but currently remains with the highest-attendance for an animated film in the industry, with 4.1 Million. It is also its thirteenth highest-grossing domestic film of all time.

Pantelion Films released this film in the United States on 4 September 2015 in the original Spanish-language format with English subtitles, where it was a surprise box-office success. The film received mostly mixed reviews upon its release.

== Plot ==
Several years after the events of the second film, Confi tells a story of Toto's rescuing of his egg friends, Willy, Bibi, and Confi himself, and Tocino the bacon, before he hatched into a chicken and then grew to be a rooster. Later that night, Toto spends time with Di, trying to confess his love when her father, Don Poncho, interrupts them. Soon after, Toto listens to a boxing-style rooster fighting match on the radio, with champion Bankivoide claiming victory.

The next morning, Toto is called to crow and wake up the entire "Granjas el Pollon" farm, but only shows his poor skills. The group find out that their home is at risk of being taken by the bank due to a lack of payments left by Abuelita's deceased husband. Don Poncho, revealing his past fighting career, prompts the entire crew to go to a village, named Tepizcoeloyo, to make a bet on their farm and that he fight against Bankivoide. Meanwhile, a duo of opossums, Tlacua and Cuache, have been constantly passed by motorcycles while seeing chickens, and trying to take them for food.

The El Padrino egg initially denies due to Poncho having lost his bet. As Toto and Di explore the Palenque arena, he gets attracted to Chiquis, a celebrity peacock, and tries to show off his boxing skills. This soon backfires as she is revealed to be Bankivoide's girlfriend. After some persuading, El Padrino finally accepts the betting offer under a set of conditions, one being that Toto must fight instead of Don Poncho, to which he refuses at first. Ultimately, however, Toto summons the courage and decides to fight against Bankivoide, fully agreeing with the conditions. Later, Bankivoide's owner, Matías "El Oscuro" Jiménez, receives a bet for "Granjas el Pollon" to his surprise, which he accepts.

The crew goes on a trip to a forest where Don Poncho tells a story of his last boxing match: he fought and lost to a fast-moving rooster, revealed to be a duck in disguise, which caused El Padrino to lose his bet money and forced Poncho to retire, humiliated. This takes the crew to a duck pond where Don Poncho has Toto enter a "fight", which turns out to be a rapping contest with Snoop Duck. However, after losing this match, Poncho requests that Toto actually fight a duck, attracting the attention of Patín Patán. In the fight with a karate duck, Toto dodges and thinks he defeats him at first, but the duck punches Toto, throwing him into the air, and he lands unconscious.

Later, as Toto regains consciousness, Patín Patán, a duck egg, shows up and reveals that Don Poncho's duck opponent was his dad, who retired and "explored" a crocodile's stomach. Eventually, seeing Toto's low strength, Patín Patán agrees to train him.

Back at the "Granjas", the discouraged Toto has a conversation with Tocino when Patín Patán encourages Toto with hype. Two days later, Toto begins his training with Patín and shows improvement in his fighting skills. That afternoon, Patán tells Toto that he needs to learn non-fighting moves, which include swimming, running, and flying, with training taking during place the following days. Burnt out, Toto rests and his friends show concern. The next morning, Don Poncho teaches him his "signature move" which involves crowing before delivering a knock-out punch. Training resumes and Toto improves in the non-fighting area overtime as well. Meanwhile, Abuelita receives a notice from her grandson about the upcoming rooster fight which she doesn't remember agreeing to.

Later, near rocky mountains, Toto is trained by the ducks from earlier on how to dodge mid-air, catching the attention of a vulture sent by Chiquis, to the suspicion of Bibi. At night, Toto is encouraged and left alone to discover his "voice". However, after having a nightmare of fighting Bankivoide, Toto loses his courage and remains behind as Abuelita takes Don Poncho instead. In a moment of remorse, Toto lashes out at Patín Patán when an army of vultures invades the "Granjas el Pollon" ranch. Toto and his egg friends fight back and get help from the ducks, leading the vultures into the rocky mountains and defeat them by flying through a narrow gap. Afterwards, Toto regains courage and the group flies off to the Palenque arena at Tepizcoeloyo.

As Don Poncho is training, Toto arrives to take his place and then enters the stage for his match against Bankivoide. The match begins with a rocky start as Toto is knocked into the wall, leaving him almost unconscious, and then runs off before being knocked back again. Then, the fight proceeds normally and Toto uses much of the methods from his training. For 11 rounds, Toto has been improving on his fighting skills as he goes, even dodging Bankivoide's knockout dunk move. On the 12th round, just when Bankivoide is tiring out, Toto uses his "signature" punch, which isn't enough to knock down Bankivoide. As time runs out, with much encouragement from his friends, Toto goes all out on Bankivoide and shows much more improvement in dodging as he fights. Finally, after remembering the love and support of his family and friends including Di, Toto knocks out Bankivoide with a perfect rooster crow, claiming victory.

In the aftermath, Bankivoide congratulates Toto, Matías "El Oscuro" Jiménez is arrested after showing to have counterfeit documents, and El Padrino wins the bet placed on Toto. In discussing the vulture invasion, Bibi reveals that Chiquis sent the army in attempt to ensure Toto's loss, much to Bankiviode's shock and disappointment, and he sents her away.

Back at the "Granjas", the entire barn celebrates with a party, and it's revealed the ranch has been paid in full. Toto ends the film with his perfect crow.

In the mid-credits, Tlacua and Cuache are seen trying to stop a motorcycle with a rope, attempting to capture a chicken. They are launched as a group of motorcycle gangs drive by. In the post-credits, as Toto thanks Patín Patán for the help, Patín's father appears, revealing he managed to escape the crocodile. The two then go off, talking about their journeys.

== Cast ==
=== Spanish ===
- Bruno Bichir as Toto, the timid protagonist who is now a rooster. He dreams of becoming a champion boxer like Bankivoide until his points-of-view changes when he officially decides to fight him.
- Angélica Vale as Bibi, a chicken egg and Willy's girlfriend.
- Omar Chaparro as Patín Patán, a dimwitted duck egg who trains Toto to becoming a boxer by teaching him fighting and non-fighting moves such as flying and swimming.
- Maite Perroni as Di, a hen and Toto's girlfriend.
- Sergio Sendel as Bankivoide, the championship boxer rooster.
- Ninel Conde as Chiquis, a seductive white peacock and Bankivoide's girlfriend. She secretly hatches a plan to launch vultures at the farm home to distract Toto.
- Carlos Espejel as Willy, a chicken egg and ex-sergeant who is Toto's best friend and Bibi's boyfriend.
- Facundo as Snoop Duck, a rapping duck. He is a spoof of Snoop Dogg.
- José Lavat as Don Poncho, a rooster who is an ex-boxer and Di's father who tries to help Toto "find his voice".
- Rubén Moya as Matías "El Oscuro" Jiménez, a man with cowboy clothes that owns Bankivoide.
- Maria Alice Delgado as Abuela
- Humberto Vélez as El Padrino
- Gabriel Riva Palacio as Confi, a Cascarón egg. Gabriel also voices Fabián.
- Rodolfo Riva Palacio as Cuache / Cíclope
- Fernando Meza as Tlacua / Pato Anfitrión
- Lourdes Morán as Mamá Gallina, a loving hen and Toto's mother.
- Kintaro Mori as Pato Cool J

=== English dub ===
- Zachary Gordon as Rolo (Toto)
- Amber Montana as Dee (Di)
- Jon Heder as Mickey Mallard (Patín Patán)
- Alyson Stoner as Sweet Pea (Chiquis)
- Jason Mewes as Carney (Confi)
- Mark Silverman as Talons of Thunder (Bankivoide)
- Talon Reid as Announcer
- Anna Brisbin as Grandma (Abuela)
- Garrett Clayton as Willie (Willy)
- Keith David as Don Alfonso (Don Poncho)
- Travis Randall Clark as Duck MC
- Meredith O'Connor as Mama Hen (Mamá Gallina)
- Leon Thomas III as Soup Duck
- Olivia Grace as Bibi
- Dan O’Day McClellan as Shady Slim (Matías "El Oscuro" Jiménez)

== Production ==
=== Animation ===
The film was animated entirely in computer animation with stereoscopic 3D, in contrast to past entries which were 2D animated. It was made under the working title, Una película con mas huevos y un gallo ("A film with more eggs and a rooster"). The film was made with the use of Autodesk software like Shotgun and Maya.

"It is a film made with a quality at the level of an international film, which already gives that feeling that it is a studio film, worthy of competition, and with which people no longer feel that difference in technical matters."
— Gabriel Riva Palacio Alatriste, co-director and co-writer of Un gallo con muchos huevos

The transition to the CG format was an entirely new approach back then, as there were no animated films of the format produced in the Mexican cinema industry at the time of development. This was proven to be a challenge, to which the filmmakers called it "very difficult" and "a path of trial and error". Fellow co-director and writer Gabriel Riva Palacio Alatriste, Rodolfo's brother, stated that the film was designed for an "international" outreach. During development, Gabriel spoke with a DreamWorks Animation representative who was visiting Mexico at the time, and later brought him to the Huevocartoon studio. Gabriel has mentioned about the representative's doubtfulness of the film's intended quality, considering its country's quality.

According to an interview with Proceso, development for the film began after Gabriel suggested to Rodolfo of making the film in full 3D animation, leading to the recruiting of new artists inexperienced in the format and over seven months of training. Gabriel and Rodolfo were among those novice in the CG field. "When working in 3D, you need to go through a process called render," they said. "[Once] you illuminate, you put cameras, that now everything is three-dimensional, you must send it to be rendered, it is as if you need at least a thousand or 1,500 computers to go through that process, which is simply a process of computing so that come out the final picture. And that investment put the company at risk because that technology does not exist in Mexico[...]" The filmmakers then went to DEL Animación to convince the company for investment, to which it agreed. "We are in debt for about three years, they left us[... ] to be able to pay them and then we are paying for the render farm, hoping that this will be a success so that the company [Huevocartoon] does not go bankrupt." The filmmakers mainly sought investment from United States-based companies due to limited amount in Mexico, and due to the former's large CG market, but still relied on those of the latter including Fidecine, Eficine, and Televisa. They also explained that the reason behind the decision for CG is for a wider marketing potential. "This is our first film to start competing in the international market, but to keep up with DreamWorks and Pixar we still need a lot more money, talent, time, training and studies," said Gabriel. The film's cockfighting theme was initially resisted due to its controversial existence, but after considering Toto's rooster character, the filmmakers have gone along with the idea while portraying it as a boxing-style sport.

=== Casting ===
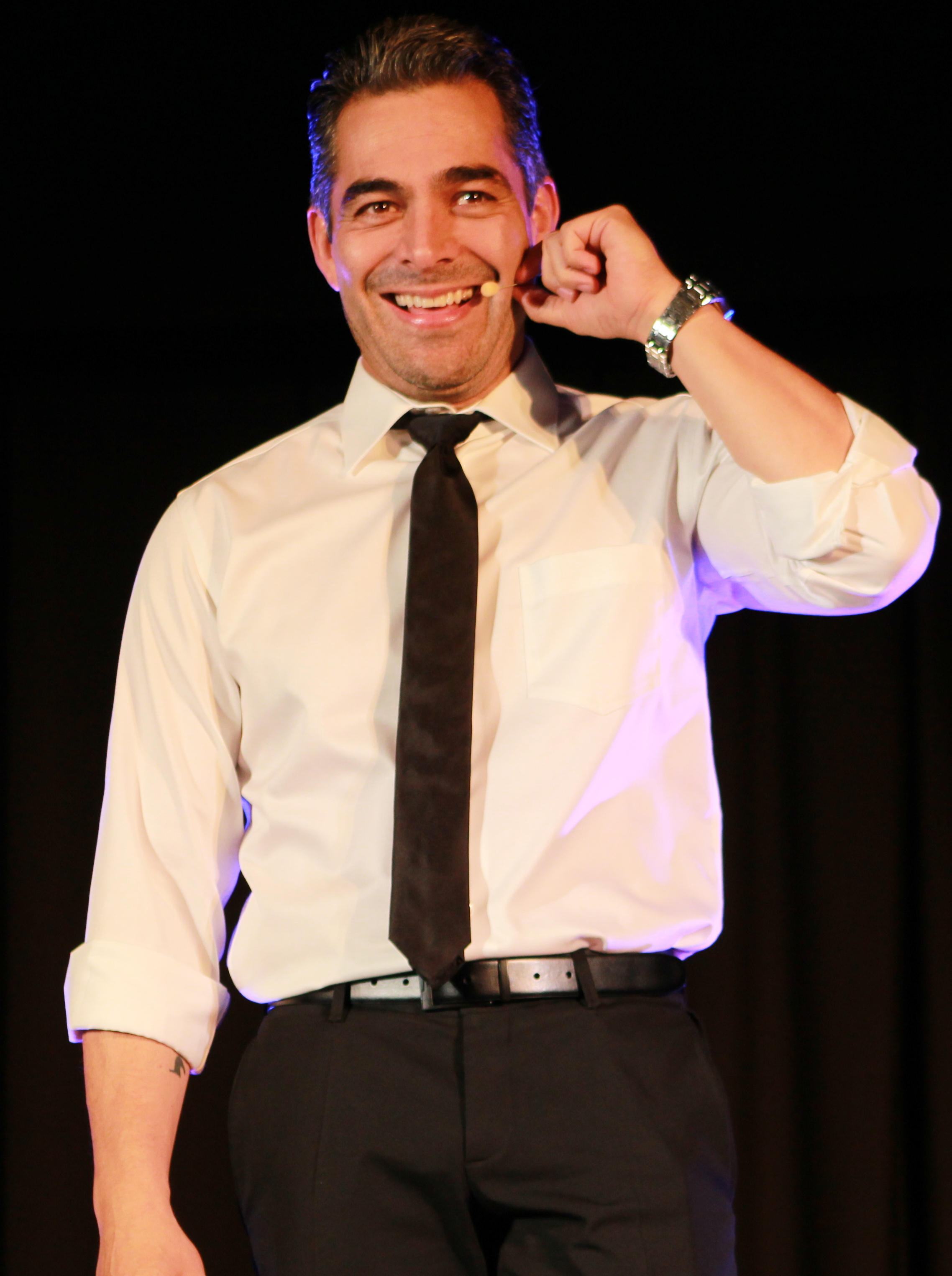
Actor Omar Chaparro, who voiced Patín Patán, has complemented the film's development strategy and national impact, calling it "worthy of admiration and applause".

For the original Spanish version, the film featured the voices of many famous Mexican actors. The entire main voice cast from the past two Huevos films have returned, much of which have reprised their respective roles; this included Bruno Bichir, Angélica Vale, Carlos Espejel, Humberto Vélez, and the Huevocartoon alumni including headers Gabriel and Rodolfo Riva Palacio Alatriste. They were joined by newcomers Maite Perroni, Sergio Sendel, Ninel Conde, Facundo, and Omar Chaparro. "We repeat with Bruno Bichir, Angélica Vale and Carlos Espegel, who have lent their voices since the first Huevocartoon film. We are already old acquaintances!," said Gabriel.

Many cast members have made their voice-acting debuts. For Ninel Conde, the voice of Chiquis, she expressed that "there was a lot of learning and [...] had to use our imagination a lot because the [chicken character...] did not yet exist."

Omar Chaparro, the voice of Patín Patán, had prior voice-acting experience in Spanish dubs of films such as The Incredibles and the Kung Fu Panda films. Un gallo was the first time the actor voiced in an animated film in its original language. Chaparro has praised the film for its developmental strategy and national impact, citing its "beautiful story [... ]with very well[-]structured characters", and added that "Rodolfo and Gabriel Riva Palacio (directors) did a great job." In explaining the differences of dubbing and voice-acting, he said, “the films were completely finished, with the voices and the drawings, and I had to adapt my words to the movements of the lips of the characters that touched me, which [had] a good degree of difficulty; But now, I started from scratch, only with the script and a pencil sketch that later changed, because the character was created from my work.” Chaparro further explained that his work allowed him "much more freedom, but also more responsibility" due to the dependency of his words and actions, and adding that he "ended up giving a lot of energy and a lot of madness". Chaparro called the film "something very particular" and "completely original", understanding that the film was produced in Mexico over "big studios or anything before it". While calling it "a challenge to transfer this humor to the time of dubbing", he said it "made me very proud". As for his character, Chaparro expressed enjoyment, noting the similarities of his own personality and "qualities". “I had a lot of space to put my jokes on him and improvise," he added.

During an interview, in explaining his lead role as Toto, Bruno Bichir has said that he "[felt] totally identified with [the] character." When ask what he learned from his role, he added that "The great theme is that together[,] we can realize our dreams and fight for good [...] without hurting others but defending who we are, the most just and unprotected causes."

The Americanized English-dub, renamed Huevos: Little Rooster's Egg-cellent Adventure, was released two weeks after its original Spanish version, which featured the voices of Zachary Gordon, Amber Montana, Alyson Stoner, Jason Mewes, and Jon Heder.

=== Music ===
Spanish musician Zacarías M. de la Riva has composed the film's soundtrack, replacing Huevocartoon co-founder Carlos Zepeda. The film's orchestra performance was done in Bulgaria. "Un gallo is at its core a story about overcoming our fears with humility and hard work and also about the value of friendship, so the music had to reflect those elements," said the composer. Zacarías explained about his challenges of music compositions in animated films, saying that "Un gallo was no different", but added that "it was a lot of fun!"

==== Soundtrack ====
The film's soundtrack album was released by MovieScore Media digitally on September 5, 2015, with a physical version later being released on October 16 that year.

Un gallo con muchos huevos (Original Motion Picture Soundtrack)

Film score by Zacarías M. de la Riva
- Released: September 5, 2015
- Genre: Film score
- Label: MovieScore Media

Un gallo con muchos huevos (Original Motion Picture Soundtrack)
No.	Title	Length
1.	"League of the Egg Avengers"	3:26
2.	"Toto the Rooster"	1:51
3.	"Start the Fight!"	3:51
4.	"Don Poncho"	1:56
5.	"It's a Duck!"	1:44
6.	"The Arena"	3:25
7.	"Eggscent of a Woman"	1:40
8.	"Attack of the Vultures"	4:27
9.	"The Egg"	1:43
10.	"Toto Ovowhelmed"	1:52
11.	"Fight to Win"	1:34
12.	"Patín Patán"	4:00
13.	"Entering Bankivoide"	3:08
14.	"Yes You Can!"	2:49
15.	"Find Your Inner Yolk"	3:02
16.	"The Fight"	5:22
17.	"Toto Lives"	2:52
18.	"Little Rooster's Egg-Cellent Adventure"	6:39

== Release ==
The film was released in cinemas in the United States on 4 September 2015 by Pantelion Films in 395 theaters across the country. It expanded to 616 theaters the following week, making it the first time a Mexican animated feature had received a wide release in the United States. Despite being the third film in the franchise the film's 2 predecessors have no English subtitles or dubs and were never released there. "We're very pleased about the quality we achieved," Gabriel Riva said in an interview. He also stated that being able to debut the film in the U.S. "is a dream come true".

=== Box office ===
In Mexico, the film spent three weeks at the number one position. In its first week it earning around $56,904,145 pesos (US$3,380,642) from 2,462 screens. It dropped by -40% in its second week to end the weekend with $1,712,867, and by 30 percent to end the weekend with $1,198,137. Its cumulative total after three weeks is $7,613,968.

In the United States, the film opened at #9 earning around $3.4 million. In its second weekend it increased to 616 screens, seeing a decline of 41 percent to $2,024,134. Its cumulative total after two weeks was $6,791,486.

As of April 18, 2016, the film has grossed $9,080,818 at North American theaters and $16,161,585 from international markets, giving it a worldwide total of $25,242,403.

=== Critical reception ===
The film received mostly mixed reviews from critics in which they praised it for being an improvement over its predecessors and its overall entertainment value, while some are divided over its adult humor which they called it "racy", hence its PG-13 rating, and expressing uncertainty as to whether it is family-oriented. On Rotten Tomatoes, the film holds an approval rating of 65% based on 17 reviews, with an average rating of 5.8/10. Audiences polled by CinemaScore gave the film a rare grade of "A+" on an A+ to F scale.

=== Accolades ===
In 2016 the film won the Luminus Awards for Best Animated Film and Best Advertising Campaign for a Mexican Film.

== Sequels ==
The fourth film, titled Un rescate de huevitos (formerly Huevitos en fuga), focuses on protagonists Toto and Di which they must rescue their inexperienced but cute egg children after being taken from a collector and being sold in Africa for food. Originally slated for release in 2019 and then August 2020, the film had been delayed due to the COVID-19 pandemic until it was finally released in August 2021.

The fifth and final film, titled Huevitos congelados, was released on 14 December 2022. It focused on Toto and family reuniting a baby polar bear in the South Pole. Miguel Rodarte, in his first voice-acting role, and Arath de la Torre have joined the film's voice cast.

== See also ==
- Una película de huevos
- Otra película de huevos y un pollo
- Marcianos vs. Mexicanos
