= Una película de huevos =

Una Película de Huevos
- Theatrical release poster
- Directed by: Gabriel and Rodolfo Riva Palacio Alatriste
- Written by: Gabriel and Rodolfo Riva Palacio Alatriste
- Produced by: Gabriel and Rodolfo Riva Palacio Alatriste; Francisco Arriagada; Raúl Calao; Carlos Zepeda; Jose Lara
- Starring: Bruno Bichir; Angélica Vale; Carlos Espejel
- Edited by: Valeria Foster; Leandro Spatz
- Music by: Carlos Zepeda
- Production company: Huevocartoon Producciones
- Distributed by: Videocine
- Release date: April 21, 2006
- Running time: 90 minutes
- Country: Mexico
- Language: Spanish
- Budget: $0.8 million
- Box office: MXN$142.3 million (US$8.3 million)

Una Película de Huevos (A Spanish title meaning either A Movie about Eggs or "A Movie about Balls" [courage]) is a 2006 Mexican animated adventure comedy film produced by Huevocartoon Producciones and distributed by Videocine, and is the first feature film developed by the brand. It is directed by Rodolfo Riva Palacio and Gabriel Riva Palacio and features voices of Bruno Bichir, Angélica Vale and Carlos Espejel.

The film was released on April 21, 2006, and became a commercial success, grossing $142.3 million pesos ($8.3 million USD as of 2026), and held the record as the 10th highest-grossing film produced in Mexico as of 2017. It won the Ariel Award of 2007 for 'Mejor largometraje de animación' ('Best Animated Feature Film'). The success of the film spawned into a film franchise.

== Plot ==
A hen gives birth to an egg she names Toto, whom she hopes grows up to be a "great chicken." However, Toto is separated from his mother along with a dozen of other eggs that are delivered to a supermarket, from which Toto and eleven other eggs are purchased. In captivity in an egg basket, Toto meets Willy, a lookout soldier egg who plots an escape with the other eggs. As Toto is the newcomer, Willy tells him to distract the household's cat while the others leave through the kitchen window. Toto leads the cat away from the kitchen and befriends a chocolate egg, Heuvay, from underneath the couch, who aids Toto in joining the other escaping eggs. Toto and Willy are then separated from the others by the cat, who is caught by its owner before he can eat them and is blamed for the loss of her other eggs.

The next morning, Toto plots his and Willy's escape to return to the farm where he was laid at, but Willy, wanting to accompany him, lies that he knows the way to "Granjas: El Pollón" (Big Chicken Farms in Spanish), where he assumes Toto was born. The two eggs hide from the household's husband, who drops the mute Tocino (Bacon in Spanish) after opening the fridge where Toto and Willy are hiding under. Together, the three of them manage to sneak into the lunchbox belonging to one of the family's children, which is soon dropped out of the school bus window by a bully. Heading into the sewers and using the lunchbox as a makeshift raft, Toto, Willy, and Tocino carry onward. The trio come across a fair where they stay to watch a juggler's acrobat egg named Bibi, whom Willy falls in love with at first sight.

Meanwhile, Toto's mother and two of her friends arrive at a farm where they meet some chickens that speak another "language" (possibly Gallinés-Chinés). With one of her friends serving as a translator, Toto's mother asks them about Toto. Though they say they have not seen him, they tell her that the eggs that escape from the city end up in Big Chicken Farms and the three of them set off there.

Meanwhile, Toto, Willy, and Tocino seek shelter for the night through a pipeline which takes them to the reptile farm, where a crocodile has them imprisoned with his henchmen and their eggs. They are rescued by Bibi and her two brothers Bebe and Bubi who take him to the site of the party-loving confetti eggs, where their leader Confi agrees to let them stay for the night. In the middle of the party after talking to Bibi, Willy tells Toto the truth about not knowing how to get to the Big Chicken Farms. Toto angrily insults him and leaves the party, leaving a saddened Tocino behind. As Toto leaves the fair, the reptile eggs which were led by the crocodile's theatrical egg Coco, enter the confetti egg party and capture Willy, Bibi, and her siblings. Tocino, witnessing Willy and Bibi getting tied to the track of a roller-coaster, goes to look for Toto.

The next morning, Tocino finds Toto about to leave for Big Chicken Farms in a truck, and using charades, he tells him that Willy and the others are in danger, so he accompanies Tocino to the fair. After finding Willy and Bebe still tied up (the ride doesn't operate until the park opens), Confi shows up with the Leader Egg and the now liberated kitchen eggs, and a battle breaks out between Toto and Willy's friends against the reptile eggs. Amidst the confusion, Bebe and Bubi escape and work with Toto and Tocino to derail the roller coaster before it can run Willy and Bibi over. Despite his plan failing, Coco is moved by the spectacle of the rescue and decides to befriend the chicken eggs.

After taming a wild pigeon, Toto, Willy, and Tocino fly off to Big Chicken Farms, where his mother and friends are awaiting him, and he bids his two friends goodbye before they return to the fair. Some time later, Toto has hatched into a chicken and everyone throws a big party in honor of him, along with Willy, Tocino, Bibi, Coco, and all his friends.

In the post-credit scene, Torti arrives late and finds that all the reptile eggs have gone.

== Cast ==
- Bruno Bichir as Toto, a three-day-old chicken egg who got taken away from his mother. He is sometimes stubborn, but also very gentle and caring. He has feathers for hair.
- Carlos Espejel as Willy, a four-day-old chicken egg and Sargent of Leader's army, who served as look-out in the egg container before tagging along with Toto and Tocino. He originally wants to become a rooster like Toto, until he meets Bibi and decides to change his course and choose his own road. He wears a green army helmet and a belt.
- Angélica Vale as Bibi, a spoiled, circus egg who works at a carnival and is Willy's love interest. Bibi has long, curly brown ponytail and wears a blue cape with star brooches hanging from it. She has two brothers, Bebe and Bubi.
- Miguel Guerrero as Tocino, a strip of bacon that Toto and Willy met in the floor of the kitchen. He is found useful weapon due to physical properties such as elasticity and greasiness. Tocino explains through physical movement which can be easily understood by most characters. He doesn't speak throughout the film; however, he does talk in the "bloopers" sequence. He doesn't wear any clothing, but his feet resemble shoes.
- Rodolfo Riva Palacio Alatriste as Coco, a crocodile egg and the leader of the reptile gang sent by the adult reptiles to crush the chicken eggs. Despite his leadership, he doesn't really care about the missions given to him by his father and spends most of his time dreaming of becoming a famous actor. He has big, bulk-like arms tipped with yellowish cuffs and an exaggerated Elvis Presley-style hairdo. Rodolfo also voiced Iguano, an iguana egg and the second-in-command and largest member of the reptile egg gang, whose intelligence is low. He often carries a club and has messy overgrown hair. Among others, Rodolfo also voiced Cuache, an easy-going rat, Poeta Huevo #2 (Egg Poet #2) from the deleted ending scene, and Hue Bond, an egg resembling James Bond who only appears in the bloopers segment.
- Gabriel Riva Palacio Alatriste as Confi, a Cascarón egg and the most prominent of the eggs who share the same name. Among his people, he's considered some sort of spiritual guide and is often followed by the others in his senseless prayers and speeches. He operates the night club-like establishment behind the amusement park. Like traditional confetti eggs, he is painted in bright colors and tipped with a piece of navy blue india paper. Gabriel also voices Serp, a rattlesnake egg and a member of Coco's gang. He's very quick tempered, which contrasts starkly with the easygoing nature of the fellow reptile eggs. He's constantly scolding Coco into concentrating on the mission at hand. Due to being a snake egg, he lacks hands and so depends on his surfacing tail to grab objects. Among other characters voiced by Gabriel are Poeta Huevo #3 (Egg Poet #3) who only appears in the deleted ending scene, and Torti, slow tortoise egg who has powerful jaws that Coco's gang commonly use to snap objects apart. He often annoys his fellow gang members due to his slow movements. He's the only quadrupedal egg featured in his gang.
- Humberto Vélez as Huevo de chocolate (Chocolate egg) a.k.a. Huevay "El Segundo", a chocolate egg who got lost into the family's sofa for a year. He can be referred as a portrayal of black people, but his behavior suggests he's actually of Cuban race. He wears what resembles to be golden pants.
- Blas García as Huevo Líder (Egg Leader) the General of the kitchen's egg army. He's quick to recruit any new eggs into his gang, even when they're not interested. He has bad hearing, which derived on him calling Toto "Pompis". He speaks in a German accent and is the only egg with facial hair. He wears a General army hat.
- Enzo Fortuny as Bebe and Mario Filio as Bubi, Bibi's brothers who perform in the same juggling act as her. Despite their childish looks, Bebe and Bubi are very mature and show deep love for their sister. Bebe is a large egg who wears a red body suit with star markings and has a mohawk, while Bubi is a blond egg who wears a blue bodysuit with a star on the chest. Filio also voices Huevito Preso #1 (Egg Prisoner #1).
- Gaby Torres as Clara, the Leader's loud subordinate and Willy's superior. She often bosses around with other eggs, but does so out of genuine concern for their safety.
- Irwin Daayán as Fefe and Gogo / Vendedor (seller)
- Carlos Cobos as Effeminate Egg
- Fernando Meza as Tlacua, a hungry and quick-tempered rat / Lagartijo, a neurotic egg who is part of the reptile egg gang / Poeta Huevo #1 (Egg Poet #1)
- Rubén Moya as Cocodrilo, the crocodile leader of the adult reptile eggs group and father of Coco. He hopes for his son to be cruel and a bully just like him, but is depressed by the fact that Coco cares more about acting. Cocodrilo has a military-like hairdo.
- Lourdes Morán as Mamá Gallina, Toto's sweet and caring mother hen, who is also brave who decided to leave her barn to find her son that's been taken away from her. She wears a blue handkerchief around her neck.

== Production ==
=== Development ===
In April 2002, Rodolfo Riva Palacio Alatriste was the director of a live action film titled Anatomy of a Robbery, from which he was being fired by Eckehardt Von Damm (at that time, director of the company Videocine), as said film was going to be canceled due to not arousing Von Damm's interest. However, before leaving his office he showed him one of the animations he had made (together with his brother Gabriel) for the nascent project of his authorship, Huevocartoon.com, a flash animation site with irreverent humor, and proposed to him the idea of making an animated film based on those short films that he and his brother made for the Internet, giving him a simple improvised pitch about the story of "two eggs that don't want to be cooked, and one of them wants to be cooked... only to become a chicken", being a road movie in which the characters would encounter various obstacles before reaching their destination. This idea encouraged Von Damm to request a script from Riva Palacio and to continue working with him on the idea.

The pre-production work, voice recording, musical composition and creation of the original music, post-production processes and marketing and advertising design was carried out in Mexico directly by Huevocartoon Producciones.

The film's animation was carried out in Argentina by Focus, under the production direction of Claudio Groppo, with production services from the Hook Up Animation studio, under the direction of Huevocartoon Producciones. With an approximate staff of ninety artists and for a period of more than thirteen months, Hook Up Animation was in charge of the development and direction of the 2D and 3D animation, including art direction, character designs and background designs, generating more than 150,000 original drawings.

Originally, the film's production title was Una película de huevos: En busca de mamá gallina, but it was eventually renamed simply Una película de huevos. However, for its release in Argentina in early 2007, the film retained its working title.

== Release ==
The film was released in theaters in Mexico on 21 April 2006. The film, along with its successor, were released on DVD in the United States as a "2-Pack". However, neither film received in a major U.S. release due to their "racist" and "violent" nature, which failed to comply with the American humor code within the industry and the 2 films have no English subtitles or dubs.

== Sequels ==
The success of the film has spawned into a series of films. The first sequel, Otra película de huevos y un pollo was released in 2009, and the second sequel, Un gallo con muchos huevos, was released in 2015, both of which also became box office successes.

A fourth installment, titled Un rescate de huevitos, was released on August 12, 2021. The fifth and final installment, titled Huevitos congelados, was released on December 14, 2022 on Vix+.

== Videogame ==
A video game based on the film was released on 19 April 2010, named Un Juego de Huevos. It was designed and released exclusively for the Zeebo system, a 3G wireless-enabled entertainment and education platform from Zeebo Inc. currently available in Mexico and Brazil.

== Upcoming live-action remake ==
In 2025, Videocine announced that the live-action adaptation of the film is in works.

== See also ==
- Otra Película de Huevos y un Pollo
- Un gallo con muchos huevos
- Marcianos vs. Mexicanos
- Un rescate de huevitos
- Huevitos congelados
