= List of highest-grossing Mexican films =

The following is a list of the highest-grossing films from the Mexican film industry.

== Box office gross revenue ==
The following is a list of the highest-grossing films within the Mexican film industry, based on box office gross revenue.

Background colour † indicates films that are currently playing in theaters (as of November 2026)

| Rank | Film | Total gross (MXN) | Country | Year | Audience count |
|---|---|---|---|---|---|
| 1 | Instructions Not Included | $600,377,842 | Mexico | 2013 | 15,201,188 |
| 2 | The Noble Family | $340,299,356 | Mexico | 2013 | 7,136,680 |
| 3 | No Manches Frida 2 | $329,344,152 | Mexico; Germany; United States | 2019 | 6,651,114 |
| 4 | ¿Qué culpa tiene el niño? | $277,785,684 | Mexico | 2016 | 5,893,937 |
| 5 | La venganza del Charro Negro | $269,100,000 | Mexico; Philippines | 2026 | 4,300,000 |
| 6 | Mirreyes contra Godínez | $238,702,189 | Mexico | 2019 | 4,582,109 |
| 7 | No Manches Frida | $222,375,687 | Mexico; Germany; United States | 2016 | 5,105,074 |
| 8 | Radical | $208,308,682 | Mexico | 2023 | 3,203,105 |
| 9 | Hazlo como hombre | $201,034,066 | Mexico; Chile | 2017 | 4,350,342 |
| 10 | Ya veremos | $197,709,023 | Mexico | 2018 | 4,134,851 |
| 11 | The Perfect Dictatorship | $189,218,721 | Mexico | 2014 | 4,186,721 |
| 12 | Cásese quien pueda | $168,390,746 | Mexico | 2014 | 4,090,731 |
| 13 | Un gallo con muchos huevos | $167,808,502 | Mexico | 2015 | 4,131,013 |
| 14 | The Crime of Father Amaro | $162,650,000 | Mexico; Spain | 2002 | 5,238,928 |
| 15 | La Boda de Valentina | $159,196,389 | Mexico | 2018 | 3,351,579 |
| 16 | Little Boy | $148,320,000 | Mexico; United States | 2015 | 3,342,259 |
| 17 | Una película de huevos | $142,347,787 | Mexico | 2006 | 3,994,361 |
| 18 | Mesa de regalos | $136,600,000 | Mexico; Argentina; Spain | 2025 | 1,900,000 |
| 19 | Tod@s caen | $136,046,896 | Mexico | 2019 | 2,676,137 |
| 20 | Treintona, soltera y fantástica | $135,656,112 | Mexico | 2016 | 2,957,046 |
| 21 | Rudo y Cursi | $127,885,561 | Mexico | 2008 | 3,019,297 |
| 22 | Cantinflas | $127,436,304 | Mexico | 2014 | 2,822,170 |
| 23 | A la mala | $126,594,027 | Mexico | 2015 | 2,800,742 |
| 24 | No eres tú, soy yo | $125,770,398 | Mexico | 2010 | 2,908,208 |
| 25 | 3 Idiotas | $125,649,202 | Mexico | 2017 | 2,688,323 |
| 26 | Perfect Strangers | $123,310,159 | Mexico | 2019 | 2,211,764 |
| 27 | Kilometer 31 | $118,854,771 | Mexico | 2007 | 3,219,076 |
| 28 | Sexo, pudor y lágrimas | $118,000,000 | Mexico | 1999 | 5,000,000 |
| 29 | Otra película de huevos y un pollo | $113,588,002 | Mexico | 2009 | 3,095,106 |
| 30 | Dulce familia | $112,665,565 | Mexico | 2019 | 2,226,206 |
| 31 | Don gato y su pandilla | $112,250,685 | Mexico; Argentina | 2011 | 2,595,664 |
| 32 | Me gusta, pero me asusta | $110,185,867 | Mexico | 2017 | 2,650,955 |
| 33 | Como contrar a tu patan | $108,876,014 | Mexico | 2017 | 2,359,646 |
| 34 | Cindy la Regia | $106,541,500 | Mexico | 2020 | 1,876,687 |
| 35 | Una mujer sin filtro | $103,535,267 | Mexico | 2018 | 2,132,356 |
| 36 | Y tu mamá también | $103,000,000 | Mexico | 2001 | 3,200,000 |
| 37 | El candidato honesto | $102,667,579 | Mexico | 2024 | 1,656,091 |
| 38 | Infelices para siempre | $101,738,336 | Mexico | 2023 | 1,780,942 |
| 39 | Under the Same Moon | $101,000,000 | Mexico; United States | 2008 | 2,500,000 |
| 40 | La leyenda del Charro Negro | $100,848,993 | Mexico | 2018 | 2,408,475 |
| 41 | La leyenda del Chupacabras | $100,106,252 | Mexico | 2016 | 2,593,419 |
| 42 | La boda de mi mejor amigo | $100,100,000 | Mexico | 2019 | 1,890,000 |

== Box office ticket sales ==
The following is a list of Mexican films that have had the highest ticket sales at the worldwide box office.

| Film | Year | Known box office ticket sales | | | | | Ref |
| Film | Year | Mexico | USA & Canada | Soviet Union | Other markets | Worldwide | Ref |
|---|---|---|---|---|---|---|---|
| Yesenia | 1971 | Unknown | Unknown | 91,400,000 | —N/a | 91,400,000 | |
| Corazón Salvaje | 1968 | Unknown | —N/a | 41,600,000 | Unknown | 41,600,000 | |
| The Great Adventure of Zorro | 1976 | Unknown | —N/a | 38,400,000 | —N/a | 38,400,000 | |
| Una cita de amor | 1958 | Unknown | —N/a | 32,300,000 | Unknown | 32,300,000 | |
| 800 Leguas Por el Amazonas | 1959 | Unknown | Unknown | 30,100,000 | —N/a | 30,100,000 | |
| Rosas Blancas Para mi Hermana Negra | 1970 | Unknown | —N/a | 26,600,000 | —N/a | 26,600,000 | |
| El hombre de los hongos | 1976 | Unknown | —N/a | 23,700,000 | Unknown | 23,700,000 | |
| Juana Gallo | 1961 | Unknown | Unknown | 22,700,000 | Unknown | 22,700,000 | |
| Aventuras de un Caballo Blanco y un Niño | 1975 | Unknown | —N/a | 21,600,000 | —N/a | 21,600,000 | |
| Instructions Not Included | 2013 | 15,163,504 | 5,466,610 | —N/a | 113,539 | 20,743,653 | |

== Highest-grossing Mexican film franchise and series ==
These are the list of highest-grossing film franchises and series of Mexico. The financial count is in Mexican peso.

Highest-grossing Mexican franchises and film series(The films in each franchise can be viewed by selecting "show")

| Rank | Series | Total MXN box office | No. of films | Average of films | Highest-grossing film |

| 1 | No Manches Frida | $551,719,839 | 2 | $275,859,920 | No Manches Frida 2 ($329,344,152) |
| 1 | No Manches Frida 2 (2019) | $329,344,152 | | | |
| 2 | No Manches Frida (2016) | $222,375,687 | | | |

| 2 | Huevos | $473,744,291 | 5 | $94,748,858 | Un gallo con muchos huevos ($167,808,502) |
| 1 | Un gallo con muchos huevos (2015) | $167,808,502 | | | |
| 2 | Una película de huevos (2006) | $142,347,787 | | | |
| 3 | Otra película de huevos y un pollo (2009) | $113,588,002 | | | |
| 4 | Un rescate de huevitos (2021) | $50,000,000 | | | |

| 3 | Leyendas | $623,037,175 | 6 | $103,839,529 | La venganza del Charro Negro ($232,170,000) |
| 1 | La venganza del Charro Negro (2026) | $232,170,000 | | | |
| 2 | La leyenda del Charro Negro (2018) | $100,848,993 | | | |
| 3 | La leyenda del Chupacabras (2016) | $100,106,252 | | | |
| 4 | La leyenda de las Momias (2014) | $92,252,814 | | | |
| 5 | La leyenda de la Llorona (2011) | $55,416,479 | | | |
| 6 | La leyenda de la Nahuala (2007) | $42,242,637 | | | |

| 4 | Don Gato | $166,356,435 | 2 | $83,178,218 | Don gato y su pandilla ($112,250,685) |
| 1 | Don gato y su pandilla (2011) | $112,250,685 | | | |
| 2 | Don gato, el inicio de la pandilla (2015) | $54,105,750 | | | |

=== Film franchises with the highest attendance count ===
| # | Series | Total count | | | |
|---|---|---|---|---|---|
| # | Series | Total count | 1 | Leyendas | 14,212,838 |
| 2 | Huevos | 12,120,480 | | | |
| 3 | No Manches Frida | 11,756,188 | | | |
| 4 | Don Gato | 4,066,952 | | | |
