= Los Lopeggs =

Adult animated television series

- Genre: Adult animation Animated sitcom Comedy; Slice of life
- Created by: Rodolfo Riva Palacio Alatriste; Gabriel Riva Palacio Alatriste
- Written by: Gabriel Riva Palacio Alatriste; Rodolfo Riva Palacio Alatriste
- Voices of: Angélica Vale; Carlos Ponce; Angélica María; Juan Frese; Gabriel Riva Palacio Alatriste; Rodolfo Riva Palacio Alatriste
- Composers: Javier Calderón Huñúzuri; Javier Calderón Cleefi
- Country of origin: Mexico
- No. of seasons: 1
- No. of episodes: 6

Production
- Executive producer: Mario Almeida
- Producer: Ignacio Martínez Casares
- Running time: 12 minutes
- Production company: Huevocartoon Producciones

Original release
- Network: Pantaya; Vix; Amazon Prime Video
- Release: June 17, 2021

Los Lopeggs is a Mexican streaming adult animated comedy series created by Huevocartoon alumni Rodolfo Riva Palacio Alatriste and Gabriel Riva Palacio Alatriste for Pantaya. It features a cast of anthropomorphic eggs in a Hispanic family-like setting. The series features the voices of Angélica Vale and Carlos Ponce.

The series premiered on 17 June 2021 on Pantaya (now Vix) in the United States. It was the platform's first animated original series.

== Synopsis ==
After being fired from his job, Yema (Carlos Ponce) and his family start a new business selling tacos with their new food truck in Huevalifornia.

== Voices ==
- Carlos Ponce as Yema
- Angélica Vale as Carla

== Release ==
The first six episodes premiered on Pantaya on 17 June 2021, with the first episode being made available for free viewing.
