= Los Colorados =

Los Colorados may refer to:

- Los Colorados (caldera), a caldera in Chile
- Los Colorados Formation, a geological formation in western Argentina
- Los Colorados mine, an iron mine in Atacama Region, Chile
- Los Colorados (music group), music group from Ukraine
- Los Colorado, A Mexican animated series starring El Chapulín Colorado and his family
