= Otra película de huevos y un pollo =

- Theatrical release poster
- Directed by: Gabriel Riva Palacio Alatriste; Rodolfo Riva Palacio Alatriste
- Written by: Rodolfo Riva Palacio Alatriste
- Produced by: Paco Arriagada Cuadriello; Carlos Zepeda; Elisa Salinas; Vance Owen
- Starring: Bruno Bichir; Angélica Vale; Carlos Espejel; Darío T. Pie; Gabriel Riva Palacio Alatriste; Rodolfo Riva Palacio Alatriste; Humberto Vélez; Patricio Castillo
- Edited by: Ignacio Alaniz; Joaquim Martí Marques
- Music by: Carlos Zepeda
- Production companies: Huevocartoon Producciones; Cinépolis Producciones
- Distributed by: Videocine
- Release date: March 20, 2009
- Running time: 100 minutes
- Country: Mexico
- Language: Spanish
- Budget: $1.9 million
- Box office: MX$113.9 million (US$8.6 million)

Otra Película de Huevos y un Pollo (Spanish for Another Movie about Eggs and a Chick) is a 2009 Mexican animated adventure comedy film produced by a Mexican animation studio Huevocartoon Producciones, and is the sequel to the 2006 film Una Película de Huevos, as part of the Huevos film series.

The film was released in Mexico on 20 March 2009, which was a major commercial success, grossing a total of $113.9 million pesos (US$6.1 million).

Along with its predecessor, this film was released direct-to-video as a "2-Pack" in the United States.

== Plot ==
In a ghost town inhabited by a shaman wizard, his enchanted stone egg, the sorcerer Huevo Brujo, makes final preparations for a "Power Spell." However, he learns that one of the most crucial ingredients is missing: a chicken's heart.

Shortly after the events of Una Pelicula de Huevos, in the Big Chicken Farms, Toto, now a chick, continues to spend time with his egg and food friends, but finds himself struggling to adjust to life as a chicken, finding food like worms repulsive. Later that night, he is kidnapped by buzzard eggs, leading him to the desert where Huevo Brujo resides. Tocino, witnessing this, runs off and wordlessly informs Toto's other friends at the fair. After stealing an egg truck the next morning, Toto's friends head out to rescue Toto.

In the ghost town, Toto meets face to face with Huevo Brujo, who begins to make his recipe. Before Huevo Brujo can take Toto's heart, a customer enters the shaman's shop and forces the eggs into hiding with Toto. Toto breaks free and charges the customer, causing them to flee. The shaman puts Toto out into the street, freeing him of Huevo Brujo but leaving him to fend for himself in the desert where he eventually collapses from exhaustion. Meanwhile, Huevo Brujo amasses an army of scorpion eggs to assist the buzzard eggs in hunting for Toto.

Upon arriving at the ghost town, Toto' friends are attacked by the scorpion eggs, who are turned away by an earth egg named Roe Boat who tells the scorpion eggs she has not seen Toto. Using Tocino for surveillance, the group spots Toto with the scorpion eggs approaching him. The group reaches Toto in time and manage to drive the scorpion eggs away, but one manages to sting Willy and break his shell, causing him to begin rotting and dying. Old Roe suggests consulting the wise Old Hawk Egg, whom Toto claims to have seen in a vision while lost in the desert, and together, Toto and Tocino leave to find him.

That night, the Egg-Wizard is informed of the failed attempts at retrieving Toto and creates a new army of zombified broken shells. Meanwhile, Toto and Tocino find the scorpion eggs frozen in ice near where Toto had his vision, and they decide to free them. After the scorpion egg's leader allows them to pass out of respect, Toto and Tocino are snatched by a hawk and taken to the Old Hawk Egg's lair. There, the Old Hawk Egg helps guide Toto into realizing the medicinal plants that grow there and the lotion the Old Hawk Eggs makes from them will heal Willy, and the two return to the ghost town with the ingredients in tow.

At dawn, one of Huevo Brujo's hencheggs threatens Roe Boat to give Toto to them at noon or be killed. The eggs refuse and prepare for battle. Huevo Brujo sends out the first wave of zombie eggs, which nearly overpower Toto and the others before the scorpion eggs return and take the zombie eggs out as a favor to Toto and Tocino for saving them. Huevo Brujo's hencheggs then attack with remote-controlled Matchbox trucks, but Coco and Bacon crash them.

Huevo Brujo arrives and begins using his magic to turn Toto's friends into sweets, though Tocino manages to escape. Toto faces Huevo Brujo alone and is about to be killed until Tocino and Willy, who is cured of his rotting, attach Huevo Brujo's chain to a rocket, where it flies up and explodes. The story ends with Toto returning to his farm and his mother and having a big party with all his friends.

In a mid-credits scene, Huevo Brujo falls on the floor and is eaten by the opossum Cuache, with Tlacua warning him that using the bathroom will hurt.

== Voice cast ==
- Bruno Bichir as Toto, a serious but caring chick.
- Carlos Espejel as Willy, a chicken egg and an ex-sergeant, he now is a medic egg. He is a good friend of Toto and Tocino and Bibi's boyfriend.
- Angélica Vale as Bibi, a spoiled chicken egg which works on a juggling act in a fair with her brothers. She is Willy's girlfriend.
- Darío T. Pie as Huevo Brujo, an eccentric stone wizard egg. He wants Toto's heart to give himself ultimate power. His minions are the buzzard eggs, Manotas and Patotas, an iguana (formerly), and zombie-eggs. The scorpion eggs aren't his minions, more than mercenaries that he hired.
- Lucila Mariscal as La Hueva-Lancha, an ugly and kind yard egg who helps Willy and his friends to find Toto. She lives in an abandoned supermarket with other 7 yard eggs.
- Patricio Castillo is El Viejo Huevo de Halcón, a wise hawk egg who lives in top of a mountain, he hasn't hatched (despite being 75 years old) by using some type of medicinal plants.
- Humberto Velez as Huevay II, a chocolate egg and Confi's best friend. His speech and behavior probably states he is Cuban. He melts several times in the movie.
- Rodolfo Riva Palacio Alatriste as Coco, a theater-loving and dramatic crocodile egg. He is the leader of the reptile eggs. / Iguano, a dim-witted but very strong iguana egg, he is Coco's second-in command. / Manotas, a stupid ostrich egg who cares a lot for his brother Patotas. He is shown to be a little smarter than Patotas, and has black eyes instead of blue to tell him apart from Patotas. / Cuache, an easygoing opossum.
- Gabriel Riva Palacio Alatriste as Confi, the most prominent of all of the confetti eggs (who are also named Confi) he is a parody of hippies and drug users, and most confetti eggs follow his stupid prayers/ Patotas, a stupid ostrich egg who cares a lot for Manotas. He has blue eyes and his tongue sticking out. / Torti, a strong but slow tortoise egg. / Huevo de Escorpión, one of the scorpion eggs and the one who stung Willy.
- Fernando Meza as Tlacua, a serious opossum / Lagartijo, an emotionally unstable lizard egg. / Huevo de Escorpión Líder, the leader of the scorpion eggs. He sports a punk hairstyle.
- Armando Gonzalez as Apolononio, one of the buzzard eggs.
- Tocino, a mute and friendly strip of bacon. He only communicates by body signs and people usually use him as a weapon or a tool due his flexibility and greasiness.

== Release ==
The film was released in Mexico on 20 March 2009. While the film, along with its predecessor, was released on DVD in the United States as a "2-Pack", neither film were released in any major format in the country due to their "racist" and "controversial" nature, failing to match the industry's humor code and have no English subtitles or dubs.

=== Reception ===
A reviewer of Cine Premiere has rated the film 3 stars out of 5, praising the animation and story balance while criticizing its adult content.

== Sequels ==
A third film, called Un gallo con muchos huevos (Spanish for A Rooster With Many Eggs) was released on 20 August 2015 in Mexico, and the United States on 4 September 2015. It was followed by Un rescate de huevitos released in August 2021.

The fifth and final installment, titled Huevitos congelados, was released on 14 December 2022.

== See also ==
- Una Película de Huevos
- Un gallo con muchos huevos
- Marcianos vs. Mexicanos
- Un rescate de huevitos
- Huevitos congelados
