= El Chapulín Colorado (2015 TV series) =

- Also known as: El Chapulín Colorado Animado; El Chapulín Animado
- Genre: Comedy; Slapstick; Adventure; Surreal humour Satire; Action
- Created by: Roberto Gómez Fernández
- Based on: El Chapulín Colorado by Roberto Gómez Bolaños Characters by Roberto Gomez Fernandez
- Developed by: Roberto Gómez Fernández
- Voices of: Jesús Guzmán; Enrique Horiuchi; Gabriel Basurto; Gerardo Alonso; Magda Giner
- Theme music composer: Manuel Vázquez
- Opening theme: "El Chapulín Colorado"
- Ending theme: "El Chapulín Colorado"
- Composer: Manuel Vázquez
- Country of origin: Mexico
- Original language: Spanish
- No. of seasons: 5
- No. of episodes: 74

Production
- Executive producers: Roberto Gómez Bolaños; Roberto Gómez Fernández; Fernando de Fuentes; José C. García de Letona
- Running time: 11 minutes (per segment)
- Production companies: Ánima Estudios; Grupo Chespirito; Televisa

Original release
- Network: Canal 5
- Release: April 13, 2015 – June 1, 2017

Related
- El Chapulín Colorado (original series); El Chavo Animado; El Chavo del Ocho

El Chapulín Colorado Animado is a Mexican animated series based on the live-action series of the same name, originally created by Roberto Gómez Bolaños. The show is produced by Ánima Estudios, who also produced El Chavo Animado, another animated adaptation of one of Bolaños' works.

The show first premiered on veo.tv, an online platform, on April 13, 2015, and later in television on Televisa-owned networks on July 26, 2017.

== Episode list ==
Note that none of these episodes of this animated series have ever been dubbed into Brazilian Portuguese (with the European Portuguese dub being used in the Brazilian Amazon Prime Video released instead) or English since then, in addition to these Spanish titles being translated into English for others to understand the latter language in that list, possibly.

=== Season 1 (2015) ===
Original title	Translated title
"El anillo perdido"	"The Lost Ring"
"El gigantesco Lagartossaurio"	"The Gigantic Lizardosaurus"
"¡Pido Esquina!"	"I Ask for a Corner!" (or "I Ask Corner!")
"La última criatura del Doktor Moquillo"	"Doctor Distemper's Last Creature"
"Oh cielos, el rascacielos"	"Oh Heavens, the Skyscraper" (or "Oh Dear, the Skyscraper")
"Noche de Ópera"	"Opera Night"
"La maldición de Piesapestósotl"	"The Curse of Piesapestósotl"
"La Súper Cumbre"	"The Super Summit"
"¿Aquí es donde vive el muerto?"	"Is This Where the Dead Man Lives?"
"La desaparición del maquinista"	"The Disappearance of the Engine Driver"
"El hombre casi invisible"	"The Almost Invisible Man"
"El retorno del Sr. Pip"	"The Return of Mr. Pip"
"20.000 leguas del viejo submarino"	"20,000 Leagues of the Old Submarine"

=== Season 2 (2015) ===
Original title	Translated title
"El amor es demoledor - Parte 1"	"Love is Crushing - Part 1" (or" Love is Devastating - Part 1")
"El amor es demoledor - Parte 2"	"Love is Crushing - Part 2" (or "Love is Devastating - Part 2")
"La caja china"	"The Chinese Box"
"Marinero de agua dulce"	"Freshwater Sailor"
"El código negro, una misión extraña"	"The Black Code, a Strange Mission"
"La fórmula de la invisibilidad"	"The Formula of Invisibility" (or "The Invisibility Formula)"
"El tigre anda suelto"	"The Tiger is on the Loose"
"Ramona carga con el muerto"	"Ramona Carries the Dead Man"
"A los chicharrones les dieron chicharrón"	"They Gave the Honkers Horn"
"Las nachas de Pomponio"	"Pomponio's Rest"
"Árbitro ratero"	"Thief Referee"
"La trampa"	"The Trap"
"El Matonsísimo Kid y Rosa la Rumorosa"	"The Bully Kid and Rumorous Rosa" (or "The Thug Kid and Rumorous Rosa")

=== Season 3 (2015–2016) ===
Original title	Translated title
"El gladiador colorado"	"The Colorado Gladiator" (or "The Red Gladiator")
"Oso por oso, diente por diente"	"Bear for Bear, Tooth for Tooth"
"La fuga de la presa"	"The Dam Escape"
"Amor a primera bestia"	"Love at First Beast"
"Willy, Billi, Lili, Pili, Vinny y Sharon"	"Willy, Billi, Lili, Pili, Vinny and Sharon"
"El último tango del Cucarachón Verde"	"The Green Cockroach's Last Tango" (or "The Last Tango of the Green Cockroach")
"Amor apache"	"Apache Love"
"Misión espacial"	"Space Mission"
"El asalto al banco"	"The Bank Robbery"
"Prohibido tirar bombas en horas de oficina"	"No bombs allowed during office hours"
"Los caballeros de la mesita de centro"	"The Knights of the Coffee Table" (or "Knights of the Coffee Table")
"Tú me traes volando bajo"	"You Bring Me Flying Low" (or "You Take Me Flying Low")
"El tesoro del Charro Negro"	"The Treasure of the Black Charro" (or "Black Charro's Treasure")
"Un bombón en París"	"A Big Bomb in Paris"

=== Season 4 (2016) ===
Original title	Translated title
"El oloroso robo al museo"	"The Smelly Robbery at the Museum" (or "The Smelly Museum Robbery")
"Una graciosa huída"	"A Funny Escape" (or "A Graceful Escape")
"Pachón, el gato del diablo"	"Pachon, the Devil's Cat"
"El ladrón dormilón"	"The Sleeping Thief" (or "The Sleepy Thief")
"Miedo a las alturas"	"Fear of Heights" (or "Afraid of Heights")
"El rap de Ruby Culebro"	"Ruby Culebro's Rap"
"Cábulman y la extraña desaparición del señor Revillagigedo"	"Cabulman and the Strange Disappearance of Mr. Revillagigedo"
"El mega-cohete nuclear"	"The Mega Nuclear Rocket" (or "The Nuclear Mega-Rocket")
"El Chapulín encerrado"	"El Chapulín Locked Up" (or "El Chapulín Enclosed")
"El gas telenoveloso"	"The Soap Opera Gas" (or "Soap Opera Gas")
"La maldición del tesoro pirata"	"The Curse of Pirate Treasure" (or "The Pirate Treasure's Curse")
"No es lo mismo la avalancha, que ahí te va la lancha"	"It's not the same as the avalanche, where the boat goes"
"El abominable hombre de las nieves de limón"	"The Abominable Lemon Snowman"
"El rapto de Cuco"	"The Cuco's Abduction" (or "The Cuco's Kidnapping")

=== Season 5 (2016–2017) ===
Original title	Translated title
"El bueno, el malo y el menso"	"The Good, the Bad and the Fool"
"El grafitero grosero"	"The Rude Graffiti Artist"
"Los Taconautas"	"The Taconauts"
"Inventillo de la Mancha"	"Inventillo of La Mancha"
"La gran carrera"	"The Great Race"
"Misión Subterránea"	"Underground Mission"
"El billete de lotería"	"The Lottery Ticket"
"El juicio del Dr. Moquillo"	"The Trial of Dr. Distemper" (or "Dr. Distemper's Trial")
"Los drones ladrones"	"The Thief Drones"
"El niñero colorado"	"The Colorado Babysitter" (or "The Red Babysitter")
"El cazador casado"	"The Married Hunter"
"Cambio de identidad"	"Change of Identity" (or "Identity Change")
"Disfraces Culebro"	"Snake Costumes"
"El asteroide"	"The Asteroid"
"Un ataque de risa"	"A Fit of Laughter" (or "A Laugh Attack")
"El Sasquatch y los scouts"	"The Sasquatch and the Scouts"
"El extraño caso del Dr. Pepe y el gran Juan"	"The Strange Case of Dr. Pepe and Big Juan"
"La bomba gigante"	"The Giant Bomb"
"Villanos Unidos S.A."	"United Villains Inc."
"La deuda del honorable Hikaru"	"The Honorable Hikaru's Debt"

== Follow-up series ==
Titled, El Chapulín y los Colorado (formerly Los colorado), a stand-alone animated series produced by Huevocartoon Entertainment, Telefilms, TH3 Media Group was released on HBO Max and Cartoon Network on January 1, 2026.

== See also ==
- Ánima Estudios
- Chespirito
- El Chapulín Colorado
- El Chavo Animado
