= El Chapulín y los Colorado =

Mexican animated television series

- Also known as: Los Colorado
- Genre: Comedy; Slapstick; Adventure; Surreal humour Satire; Action
- Created by: Gabriel Riva Palacio Alatriste; Rodolfo Riva Palacio Alatriste
- Based on: El Chapulín Colorado by Roberto Gómez Bolaños
- Developed by: Gabriel Riva Palacio Alatriste; Rodolfo Riva Palacio Alatriste
- Voices of: Jesús Guzmán; Verónica Bravo; Regina Ruíz Carrillo; Jorge García Lemus; Gabriel Riva Palacio Alatriste
- Composers: Amado López; Javier Calderón (original songs)
- Countries of origin: Mexico; Argentina
- Original language: Spanish
- No. of seasons: 1
- No. of episodes: 10

Production
- Executive producer: Roberto Gómez Fernández
- Producers: Ignacio Martínez Casares; Tomás Darcyl; Ricardo Costianovsky; Bruce Boren
- Running time: 22 minutes
- Production companies: Huevocartoon Entertainment; TH3 Media Group; Telefilms; Grupo Chespirito

Original release
- Network: HBO Max; Cartoon Network
- Release: January 1, 2026 – present

Related
- El Chapulín Colorado Animado; El Chapulín Colorado (original series); El Chavo Animado; El Chavo del Ocho

El Chapulín y los Colorado (also known as Los Colorado) is an animated series based on the El Chapulín Colorado series, produced by Huevocartoon Entertainment, TH3 Media Group, and Grupo Chestpirito, and the second animated series based on the original program, following Ánima's El Chapulín Colorado Animado in 2015.

The show features El Chapulín Colorado with a family while actively fighting crime in Ciudad Caótica.

The series premiered on January 1, 2026 on HBO Max and Cartoon Network with 10 22-minute episodes. The second season is on the works.

== Plot ==
Follows El Chapulín Colorado as he takes on his challenges between battling villains and stopping crimes while attending to his family in Ciudad Caótica.

== Voices ==
- Jesús Guzmán as El Chapulín Colorado, the titular character who's a clumsy and timid superhero.
- Verónica Bravo as Susana Alegría Colorado, Chapulín's wife and a talented cook.
- Regina Ruíz Carrillo as Lina Colorado, Chapulín and Susana's daughter who's shy and eccentric, and Bobby's older sister.
- Jorge García Lemus as Bobby Colorado, Chapulín and Susana's son who idolizes his father and loves soccer.
- Gabriel Riva Palacio Alatriste as Doña Luisa "Abuela" Colorado, a loving but bossy grandmother.
- Claudio Herrera as Profresor Inventillo, a scientist behind Chapulín's gadgets who's brilliant, albeit somewhat unhinged.
- Noé Velázquez as Tripaseca, the nemesis of Chapulín.

== Development ==
It was first announced in May 2024 that a new animated series based on the El Chapulín Colorado show was in development in conjunction with Huevocartoon Entertainment, Telefilms, TH3 Media Group, and Grupo Chespirito. The show's first trailer premiered in June 2025, revealing the characters and the show's first look.

Dubbing actor Jesús Guzmán, who previously voiced El Chapulín Colorado in the 2015 series and El Chavo and Godínez in El Chavo Animado, reprised his role for this series.

== See also ==
- Huevocartoon
- El Chapulín Colorado Animado
- El Chapulín Colorado (original series)
- El Chavo Animado
- El Chavo del Ocho
