= Marcianos vs. Mexicanos =

- Film poster
- Directed by: Gabriel Riva Palacio Alatriste; Rodolfo Riva Palacio Alatriste
- Written by: Gabriel Riva Palacio Alatriste; Rodolfo Riva Palacio Alatriste
- Produced by: Ignacio Casares; Gabriel Riva Palacio Alatriste; Rodolfo Riva Palacio Alatriste
- Starring: Adal Ramones; Martha Higareda; Omar Chaparro; Angélica Vale; Eduardo Manzano; Jaime Maussan
- Edited by: Julián Rivera Contreras; Gabriel Riva Palacio Alatriste; Rodolfo Riva Palacio Alatriste
- Music by: Amado López; Javier Calderón
- Production companies: Huevocartoon Producciones; Televisa; Cinergistic Films
- Distributed by: Videocine
- Release date: March 9, 2018
- Running time: 87 minutes
- Country: Mexico
- Language: Spanish
- Budget: $0.9 million
- Box office: MX$26.1 million (US$1.18 million)

Marcianos vs. Mexicanos (lit. 'Martians vs. Mexicans') is a 2018 Mexican adult animated science fiction comedy film produced, written, and directed by Gabriel Riva Palacio Alatriste and Rodolfo Riva Palacio Alatriste. The film features the voices of Adal Ramones, Martha Higareda, Omar Chaparro, Angélica Vale, Eduardo Manzano, and Jaime Maussan. Produced by Huevocartoon Producciones (best known for the Huevos franchise), it is the company's first original project as it features an entirely human cast and original story, in contrast to the company's previous feature films, following Otra Pelicula de Huevos y un Pollo (2009), and in a similar way to its internet shorts. The film is aimed for a mature audience.

The film was released in Mexico on March 9, 2018, opening to negative critical reception and a box-office disappointment.

It has been made available on digital platforms via Pantaya in the United States.

== Plot ==
Martian aliens launch an invasion of Earth, initially focusing on the United States as the perceived most powerful nation, but their advanced weapons prove ineffective against Mexicans, who resist due to physiological adaptations from a diet rich in chiles, tacos, and tequila. This unexpected immunity prompts NASA to recruit a team from Mexico for a counteroffensive.

The selected group centers on Chacas Reyes, a young man from a lower-middle-class family, accompanied by his relatives and local neighbors, who are transported to Mars to directly challenge the Martian forces threatening global conquest. The narrative chronicles their interstellar journey, encounters with Martian commanders, and strategic engagements leveraging Mexican cultural elements such as cuisine and music to overcome the extraterrestrial adversaries.

== Cast ==
- Adal Ramones as El Chacas
- Martha Higareda as La Zafiro
- Omar Chaparro as the Martian king
- Angélica Vale as La Tlacoyito
- Eduardo Manzano as Don Calcáneo
- Ricardo Hill as El Teacher
- Humberto Vélez as El General
- Fernando Meza as El Nene / Doña Chocho / El Cubano / Juan
- Mónica Santacruz Gutiérrez as La Joselyn
- Rodolfo Riva Palacio Alatriste as El Talachas / El Poli / El Mirey / Martian Soldier
- Gabriel Riva Palacio Alatriste as Jacinto / El Frijol / La Niña / El Chino / Nerd
- Jaime Maussan as himself

== Production ==
=== Development ===
The film has been in development from 2015 to 2017. The film's directors and producers Gabriel and Rodolfo Riva Palacio Alatriste said the film is a setback to the foundation of their production company, Huevocartoon Producciones, due to the company's "irreverent" and "rude" content nature. "When we started with Huevocartoon[,] we were kind of a Latin South Park, but then when we made the films[,] we had to reach another audience[.] [N]ow it will have a scratchy side," said Gabriel. Gabriel also mentioned the idea of the story is based on the real-life economic problems occurring in Mexico, and how the citizens in the film were "immune" to the Martians. "One day[,] my brother (Rodolfo) and I were talking about how the country was bad in every way: corruption, politics, everything, we told ourselves that something very big must happen to create awareness," said Gabriel. "We began to present the script and suddenly[,] this happened: [...]everything we suffer would make us immune to Martians, and NASA even sends a mission to Mexico." Adal Ramones, who portrays protagonist 'El Chacas', shared more details on the economic issues of the country and how the characters in the film would not save Earth in a traditional formula. "On this occasion, we are going to face the Martians, [and] they see that Godzilla or the aliens always arrive and attack New York[,] and it is the gringos who stop the world catastrophe[.] Well, now we Mexicans are responsible for saving the world and we do not do it precisely with a prepared army or the best technology in arms, but with their irreverent way of being and solving the lawsuits," said Ramones. "Wrestling, tacos, Mexicans who steal motherships to sell their mechanical parts on the black market, things like that are what we see and those that give more laughter, because the Riva Palacio took the 'bad' of the country and used it to [...] fight against an alien invasion [that] we see [the] stereotypes of the Mexican in different characters, from the corrupt policeman to the luchona mother." Co-director and writer, Rodolfo Riva is very satisfied with the film, to which he says that "it's a film I made with a lot of heart."

=== Casting ===
The voice cast consists of well-known Mexican talent, to which some have shared their satisfaction and call it "funny".

Adal Ramones, who plays the main protagonist 'El Chacas', calls the project "a very funny animated film" as the film is his first effort in an animated production aimed at an older audience. "My character is called (or nicknamed) 'Chacas', and he's literally a neighborhood boy who along with other people who represent Mexican stereotypes, are recruited to fight against the aliens that have already invaded the entire world, except our country," said Ramones. "It's a very funny animated film because it's the first time I've seen a production of this kind in comedy that is not for children, but for teenagers and adults really because it's very funny, very picaresque and a portrait of how we Mexicans are." Ramones had previous voice-acting experience in other animated films, such as the Spanish-language version of A Bug's Life, and El Americano.

Actress Martha Higareda, who voices 'El Zafiro', stated she is very satisfied with her voice work in the film, saying that she is "proud" to be in a film produced by Huevocartoon, a company in which she praised the filmmakers for achievement to revive the Mexican animation industry, which was not common in the country's film industry. For her role, she had to change her voice to a 'smoother'-like to match the 'sexy' trait of her character. "I had to change because I have [a] very sharp[,] and [for] 'Zafiro's voice[,] I demanded something much more dense," said Higareda. Higareda has had previous voice work experience in the Spanish dub version of Warner Bros.' Storks, La Leyenda de la Nahuala, and a guest role in Cartoon Network's Steven Universe. "I really enjoyed it, I had to do it with Storks[.] I hope that Marcianos vs. Mexicanos is one more I can do," said Higareda.

Angélica Vale, who voices 'La Tlacoyito', have also shared her 'satisfying' experience with working with the filmmakers. Vale had previously collaborated with the past productions by Huevocartoon. "My love for the Riva Palacio is something much stronger than anything. I think they are two very talented guys and how could I say no? I flattered and happy that they give chance to return to be with them in a movie no longer [in] Huevos but as the 'Tlacoyito'.

Other talents include Omar Chaparro, who previously collaborated with Huevocartoon for Un gallo con muchos huevos, Eduardo Manzano, and ufologist Jaime Maussan, among others.

=== Animation ===
The film´s animation mixes both traditional animation and CGI using Toon Boom Harmony software with inspiration by Disney films and French illustrator Jean Baptiste Fraisse being in charge of the film's art direction.

== Release ==
The film premiered in theaters in Mexico on March 9, 2018.

== Reception ==
=== Box office ===
The film opened at #4 on its opening weekend in Mexico, earning $13.5 million pesos.

=== Critical response ===
Upon its release, the film has received negative reviews from critics, to which some criticized the film's plot and humor; others praised its political impact approach. It has a 9% "Rotten" rating on the review aggregator website Tomatazos, a Mexican localized version of Rotten Tomatoes.

=== Awards and nominations ===
Year	Award	Category	Nominees	Result
2018	15th Premios Canacine	Mejor Película de Animación	Marcianos vs. Mexicanos	Nominated

== See also ==
- Una Película de Huevos
- Otra Película de Huevos y un Pollo
- Un gallo con muchos huevos
