= Pantaya =

Defunct American OTT streaming service

- Screenshot
- Website type: OTT video streaming platform
- Headquarters: Los Angeles, California, U.S.
- Country of origin: United States
- Area served: United States, Puerto Rico
- Key people: Paul Presburger (CEO)
- Parent: TelevisaUnivision
- Registration: Required
- Users: ▲0.9 million (as of April 1, 2021)
- Launched: August 1, 2017; 9 years ago
- Current status: Defunct

Pantaya was an American OTT streaming service targeted for Hispanic and Spanish-language viewers. Content included programs and films released in Latin America and original programming, as well as Spanish dubs from Lionsgate's select catalogue.

The streaming service was available in the United States and Puerto Rico, and content can be accessed globally through other streaming services such as Amazon's Prime Video.

After the acquisition of Pantaya by TelevisaUnivision in May, 7 months later in December, Pantaya ceased its services, and notified users about the switch to ViX.

== History ==
Pantaya was launched in August 2017 in a joint venture between Lionsgate and Hemisphere Media Group. Paul Presburger was appointed as CEO of the streaming service, who is also CEO of Pantelion Films. Lionsgate has owned 75% of the streaming platform while Hemisphere owned 25% at the time. In 2019, the platform has reached 500,000 subscribers. In that same year, Pantaya has expanded into producing original programming, starting with El juego de las llaves which debuted in August of that year.

In 2021, Hemisphere Media Group has acquired full ownership rights to the Pantaya streaming service from Lionsgate for $124 million, following the latter's decision to focus on the expansion of its Starz brand. Lionsgate's CEO Brian Goldsmith has stated that the studio was "very proud to have helped build Pantaya into the leading premium Spanish-language platform in the U.S.," and added that Hemisphere Media Group was "the right owner". Additionally, Hemisphere CEO Alan Sokol said that the company is aiming for expansion. "There's so much more we can do, and the opportunity is so much greater," Sokol said. "We've set a stated goal of 2.5 to 3 million subscribers by 2025. But honestly we feel that's a conservative goal and that the opportunity is two to three times that." As of April 2021, there are 900,000 subscribers to Pantaya.

More recently, she had signed a deal with actress Fernanda Castillo, whereas the actress would star in Pantaya's upcoming projects.

In May 2022, TelevisaUnivision reached a deal with Hemisphere Media Group to acquire Pantaya, targeting the platform in order to fortify their own ViX streaming service. The acquisition was completed on September 13 of that year.
