= Omar Chaparro =

Mexican actor (born 1974)

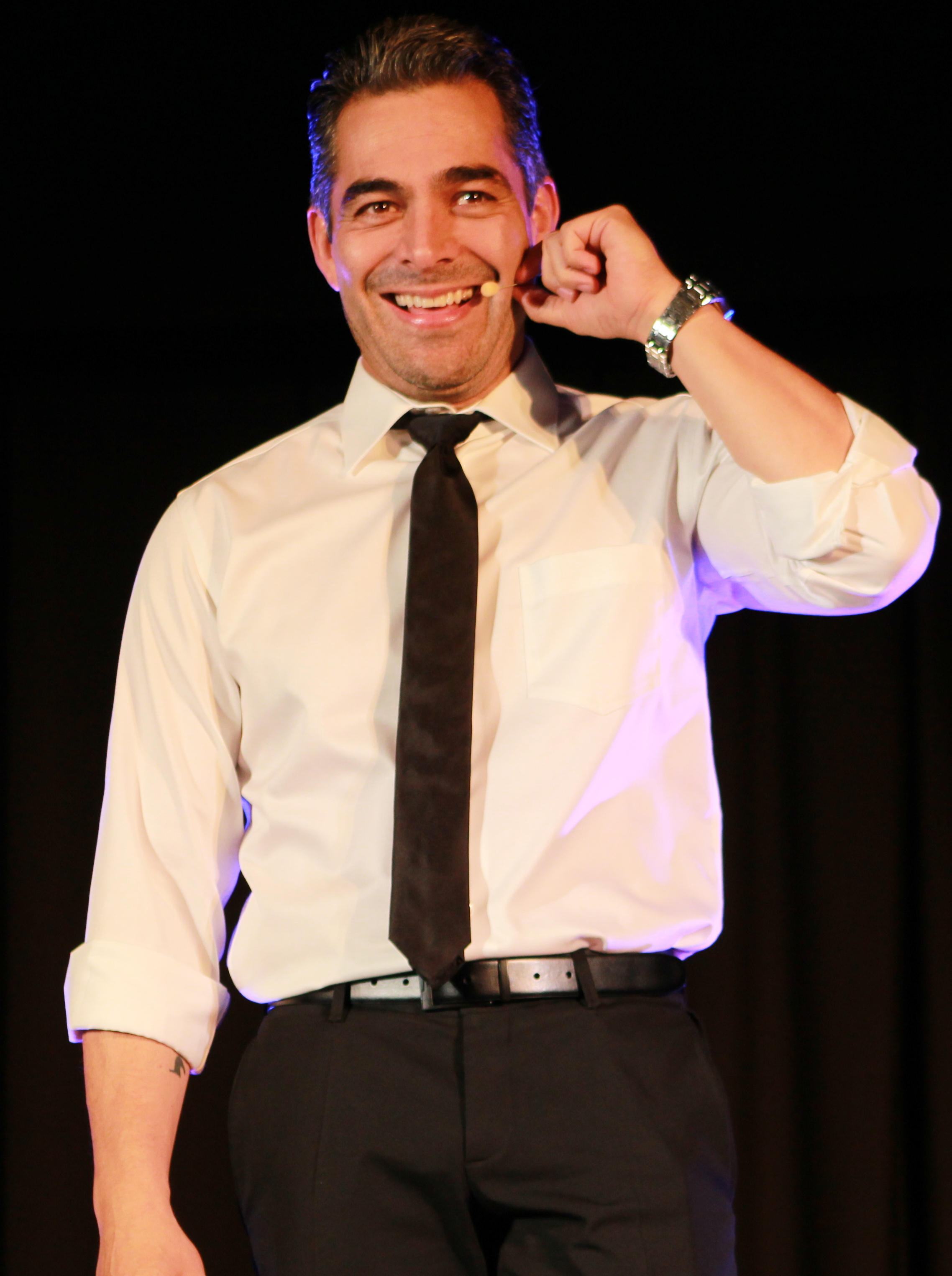
- Omar Chaparro in 2018
- Born: Omar Rafael Chaparro Alvidrez; 26 November 1974 (age 51); Chihuahua City, Chihuahua, Mexico
- Occupations: Actor; comedian; television host
- Years active: 1992–present
- Spouse: Lucy Ruiz de la Peña (m. 2001)
- Children: 3

Omar Rafael Chaparro Alvidrez (born 26 November 1974) is a Mexican actor, comedian and television host.

In 2026, he starred in the Mexican drama La celda de los milagros, produced by Netflix.

== Filmography ==
=== Film ===
Film roles
Year	Title	Role	Notes
2004	Puños rosas	Chuy	
2012	Suave patria	Óscar Alvidrez	
2012	Right to Love	Henry	
2013	Pulling Strings	Canicas	
2015	Superfast!	Juan Carlos de la Sol	
2015	Un gallo con muchos huevos	Patin Patán	Voice role
2016	Aztec Warrior	Komandante Honey Badger	Canceled film
2016	Compadres	Diego Garza	
2016	No Manches Frida	Ezequiel "Zequi" Alcántara	
2017	Stuck	Ramón	
2017	How to Be a Latin Lover	Rafa	Supporting role
2017	Condorito: la película	Condorito	Voice role
2018	La boda de Valentina	Ángel	
2018	Marcianos vs. Mexicanos	Martian King	Voice role
2018	Overboard	Burro	
2018	Show Dogs	Señor Gabriel	
2019	No Manches Frida 2	Ezequiel "Zequi" Alcántara	
2019	Detective Pikachu	Sebastian	
2019	Como caído del cielo	Pedro Guadalupe Ramos / Pedro Infante	
2022	¿Y cómo es él?	Jero	
2022	Blackout	Eddie	
2024	A Journey to the Heart, the Wingwalker	Julian	
2025	Aztec Batman: Clash of Empires	Yoka/Joker	
2025	La Celda de los Milagros	Héctor	

=== Television ===
Television roles
Year	Title	Roles	Notes
1992	Plaza Sésamo	Himself	Recurring role
2001 - 2003	Black & White	Himself	
2004	La hora pico	Various Characters	Episode: "Omar Chaparro"
2004 - 2006	No manches	Himself	Host
2006	Buenas Tardes	Himself	Host
2006	La fea más bella	Showman	Recurring role
2008	¿Qué Dice la Gente?	Himself	Host
2009 - 2010	Los diez primeros	Himself	Host
2010 - 2016	Sabadazo	Himself	Host
2019	¡Nailed it! México	Himself	Host
2019 - present	¿Quién es la máscara?	Himself	Host
2024	Love is Blind: Mexico	Himself	Host
2025	Acapulco	Octavio Cruz	
2026	Circo Gómez	Refugio Lobito Gómez	Voice role
