= José Lavat =

Mexican voice actor

- Born: José Francisco Lavat Pacheco; September 23, 1948; Mexico City, Mexico
- Died: May 15, 2018 (aged 69); Mexico City, Mexico
- Occupation: Voice actor
- Years active: 1967–2018

José Francisco Lavat Pacheco (September 23, 1948 – May 15, 2018), better known as José Lavat, was a Mexican voice actor.

Lavat was the brother of Jorge Lavat and Queta Lavat, both actors.

== Filmography ==
=== Animated films ===
Year	Title	Role	Notes
1993	El extraño mundo de Jack (The Nightmare Before Christmas)	Santa Atroz (Santa Claus)	
1998	Mulan	First Ancestor Fa	
1999	Tarzan	Kerchak	
2004	El Espantatiburones (Shark Tale)	Don Lino	
2005	Tarzan II	Kerchak	
2008	Star Wars: The Clone Wars	Conde Dooku (Count Dooku)/Darth Tyrannus	
2012	Valiente	Rey Fergus (King Fergus)	
2015	Un gallo con muchos huevos	Don Poncho	
2017	The Beagle Boys: Lost Village	Narrator (Amy Adams)	
2021	Un rescate de huevitos	Don Poncho (released posthumously)	

=== Animated TV shows ===
- La Guerra de las Galaxias: Guerra Clónicas - Count Dooku/Darth Tyrannus
- Star Wars: The Clone Wars - Count Dooku/Darth Tyrannus

=== Anime ===
- Death Note - Soichiro Yagami
- Dragon Ball Z - Narrator
- Dragon Ball GT - Narrator (episodes 1-9)
- Dragon Ball Super - Narrator (2015–18)
- Slam Dunk - Narrator

=== Live action ===
- Sol Bianca - Rammy
- Hook - Peter Banning/Peter Pan
- Indiana Jones - Indiana Jones (until Kingdom of the Crystal Skull)
- Jumanji - Alan Parrish (Robin Williams) (Original Dub)
- X-Men (film franchise) - Erik Lehnsherr/Magneto (Ian McKellen) (since X2: X-Men United)
- Lord of the Rings and The Hobbit trilogies - Gandalf (Ian McKellen)
- The Dark Knight and The Dark Knight Rises - Alfred Pennyworth (Michael Caine)
- Ted 2 - Patrick Meighan (Morgan Freeman)
- Silverado - Jake
- Night at the Museum - Cecil Fredericks (Dick Van Dyke)
- Star Wars prequels (Episodes II and III) - Count Dooku/Darth Tyrannus (Christopher Lee)
- Street Fighter - William F. Guile (Jean-Claude Van Damme)
- Saw IV, Saw V, Saw VI, Jigsaw - John Kramer / Jigsaw (Tobin Bell)
- Schindler's List - Oskar Schindler (Liam Neeson)
- Blade Runner (Re-dub) and Blade Runner 2049 - Rick Deckard (Harrison Ford)
- The Chronicles of Narnia (film series) - Aslan (Liam Neeson)

== Honors and awards ==
Lavat was also the founder of the Lavat Awards which debuted in 2019, created in recognition to the work and contributions made by numerous voice artists and announcers in Latin America.
