= Humberto Vélez =

Mexican voice actor

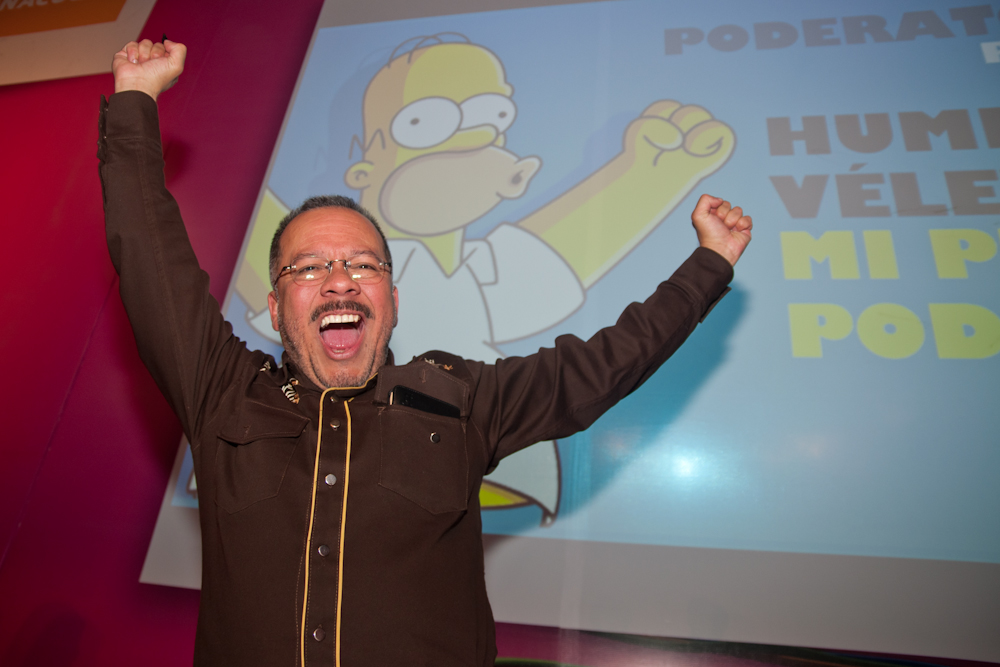
- Born: Francisco Humberto Vélez Montiel; March 30, 1955 (age 71); Orizaba, Veracruz, Mexico
- Other name: Beto Vélez
- Occupation: Actor
- Years active: 1983–present
- Notable work: The Simpsons as Homer Simpson
- Children: Alicia Vélez; Humberto Vélez Jr.

Francisco Humberto Vélez Montiel (born March 30, 1955) is a Mexican actor who is most widely known for dubbing the voice of Homer Simpson for the first 15 seasons, and again since season 32, of the Latin American dub of The Simpsons. In 2005, the dub voice cast of The Simpsons were replaced following a labour dispute. In 2021, beginning with season 32, Vélez and several other original cast members reprised their roles in The Simpsons. On December 28, 2025, he made his debut in the original English version of The Simpsons as Bumblebee Man in the episode "¡The Fall Guy-Yi-Yi!" He also made an appearance as himself in the same episode.

== Voice acting career ==
=== Animation ===
- Samwise Gamgee in the Latin American dub of the 1980 animated film, The Return of the King
- Homero Simpson in the Latin American dub of The Simpsons. (Season 1 to Season 15, Season 32-present)
  - Bumblebee Man and himself in the English version of The Simpsons ("¡The Fall Guy-Yi-Yi!", season 37)
- Peter Griffin in Family Guy (seasons 1-2)
- Professor Hubert Farnsworth and Kif Kroker in Futurama (seasons 1-4, 8)
- Malfus the Philosopher in Disenchantment
- Tarantulas in the Latin American dub of Beast Wars
- Winnie the Pooh (2001-present)
- Lord Farquaad in Shrek
- Roz in Monsters, Inc.
- Yokai/Professor Robert Callaghan in Big Hero 6
- John Silver in Treasure Planet
- P.T. Flea in A Bug's Life
- Verne in Over the Hedge
- Hondo Ohnaka in Star Wars: The Clone Wars
- Ben and Sir Robert Norramby in Thomas the Tank Engine and Friends
- Poncho Balón in Poncho Balón
- Huevay II in Una Película de Huevos and Otra Película de Huevos y un Pollo
- El Padrino in Un gallo con muchos huevos
- El General in Marcianos vs. Mexicanos

=== Live action ===
- Al Bundy in the Latin American dub of Married... with Children
- Dick Solomon in 3rd Rock from the Sun
- Ernest "Ernie" Smuntz in Mouse Hunt
- Snowbell in Stuart Little, Stuart Little 2, Stuart Little 3 and Stuart Little: The Animated Series
- Dr. Peter Burns in Melrose Place
- CSM-101 (regular voice; Alejandro Illescas as his understudy) in Terminator 2: El Juicio Final
- "Pool Cue" in Terminator 2: El Juicio Final
- Tony Soprano in The Sopranos
- Harry Wormwood and the Narrator in Matilda (the two roles were also portrayed by a single actor, Danny DeVito, in the original English version)
- Doc in Snow White and the 7 Dwarfs (2025)

=== Video games ===
- Lee Sin in League of Legends
- Call Of Duty in Vanguard
- Escolástico in Blasphemous 2
