= Videocine =

Films division of Televisa

Videocine, S.A. de C.V.
- Formerly: Televicine (1978–1999)
- Type: Division
- Industry: Film
- Founded: 1971 (unnamed); 1978 (as Televicine)
- Founder: Emilio Azcárraga Milmo
- Headquarters: Mexico City, Mexico
- Key people: Rodrigo de Pedro (general director)
- Products: Motion pictures
- Brands: Videocine Distribución; Videocine Producción
- Parent: TelevisaUnivision
- Website: Official website

Videocine, S.A. de C.V., doing business as Videocine Entretenimiento, is a Mexican film production and distribution company founded and owned by TelevisaUnivision through its Televisa Cine division. It is focused mainly on distributing and producing films for the Mexican market, while also distributing international films to the country.

It has released over 400 films, the majority of which are produced in Mexico, several being among the country's highest-grossing produced films. It has continually been releasing its films theatrically amidst competition with streaming companies and major Hollywood releases in Mexico.

== History ==
Televisa launched a then-unnamed film division on May 12, 1971, with its first film at the time being La Celestina, released in 1976. The film division was officially named Televicine on January 24, 1978. Its first film produced under the new name was El Chanfle, released in 1979.

Videocine was founded as a second film division of Televisa.^{{when?}}

In 1999, both Televicine and Videocine merged into a single company, maintaining the Videocine name.

In 2006, managing director Eckehardt von Damm stepped down after serving since 1994.

In 2021, parent company Televisa announced that it would sell its content assets to US-based Univision Communications, affecting Videocine and other brands owned by Televisa.

== Logo ==
The inspiration for the company's bicycle logo originated when they were used for transporting 35-millimeter rolls in the 1960s and 1970s under strict timing.
