= Carlos Espejel =

Mexican telenovela actor and comedian

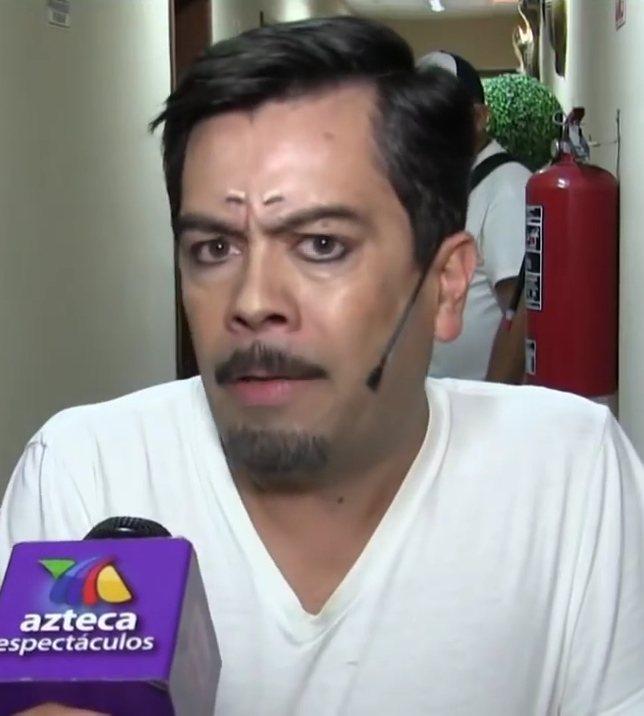
Carlos Espejel

Carlos Espejel Leguizano (born April 21, 1972) is a Mexican telenovela actor and comedian, best known for his roles as "Chiquidrácula" (1982–1987) and "Carlinflas" (1982–2006).

== Biography ==
Espejel started his acting career at an early age. In 1981 he appeared in the show Alegrías de Mediodía, where he first met one of his Humor es...los Comediantes co-hosts, Aida Pierce. In 1982, he appeared in the children's show Chiquilladas playing the role of Chiquidrácula, a vampire child who always manages to get in trouble. The catch phrase for this character was "Les va a dar mucho meyo" ("meyo" referring to «miedo») (You are going to be "afraid"). He also appeared in the show El Privilegio de Mandar as Carlinflas, a parody of the celebrated Mexican comedian, Cantinflas.

He has appeared in many telenovelas (soap operas) like Quinceañera (Sweet Fifteen), Amor en Silencio (Love in silence), Morir Para Vivir (Dying to Live) and Vivo Por Elena (I live for Elena). He co-hosted Humor es...los Comediantes from 1999 to 2001, and participated in most of the sketches on this series, most notably teamed with two of the other cohosts, Teo Gonzalez and Aida Pierce. At the same time, he played an elementary school student named "Carlitos" (his nickname in real life) on Cero en conducta (Zero in conduct); Jorge Ortiz de Pinedo was the creator, producer and star of both programs. Of trivial note, Espejel was the only co-host of Humor es...los Comediantes to have appeared in every episode.

In May 2004 he entered the reality show Big Brother VIP 3 but he was eliminated near the final. Soon after he participated on the TV show Día de Perros: el peor día de tu vida (the worst day of your life).

He began acting in La Parodia for El Privilegio de Mandar parody in 2004 and remained with the show until its end on July 9, 2006. He also provided the voiceover for Sid in Spanish, in the animated feature Ice Age. Espejel has occasionally appeared on Fabrica de Risas (Factory of Laughs).

He is featured in the 2007 book Televisa Presenta, published in time for the network's 50th anniversary. For his work in television, Espejel was inducted into the Paseo de las Luminarias in Mexico City.
