= List of La Doña cast members =

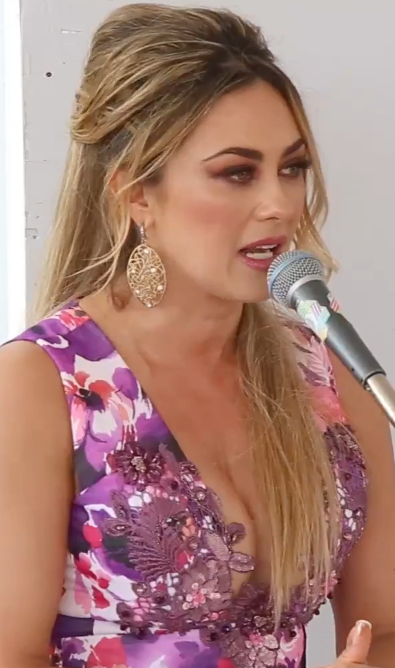
Aracely Arámbula

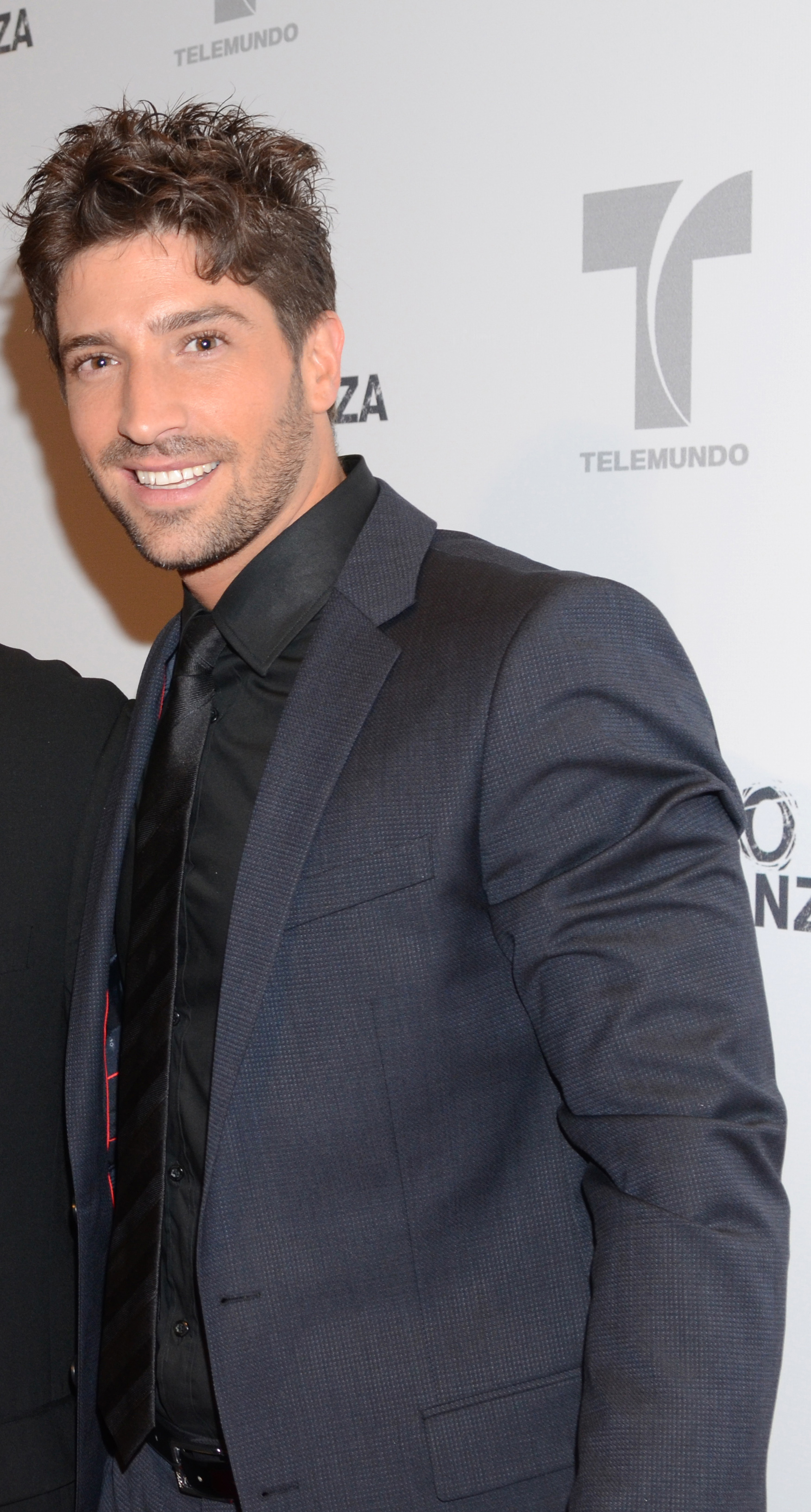
David Chocarro

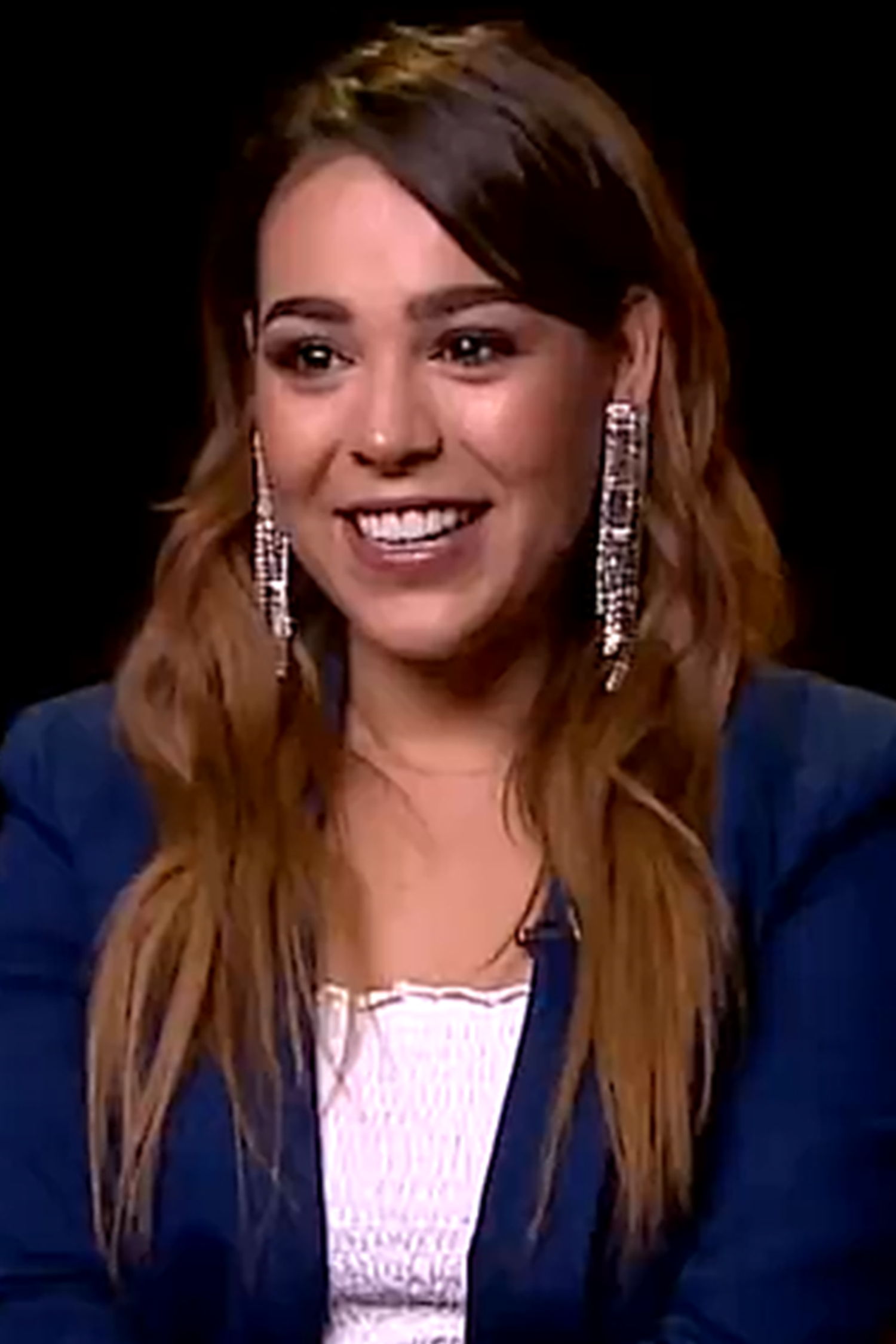
Danna Paola

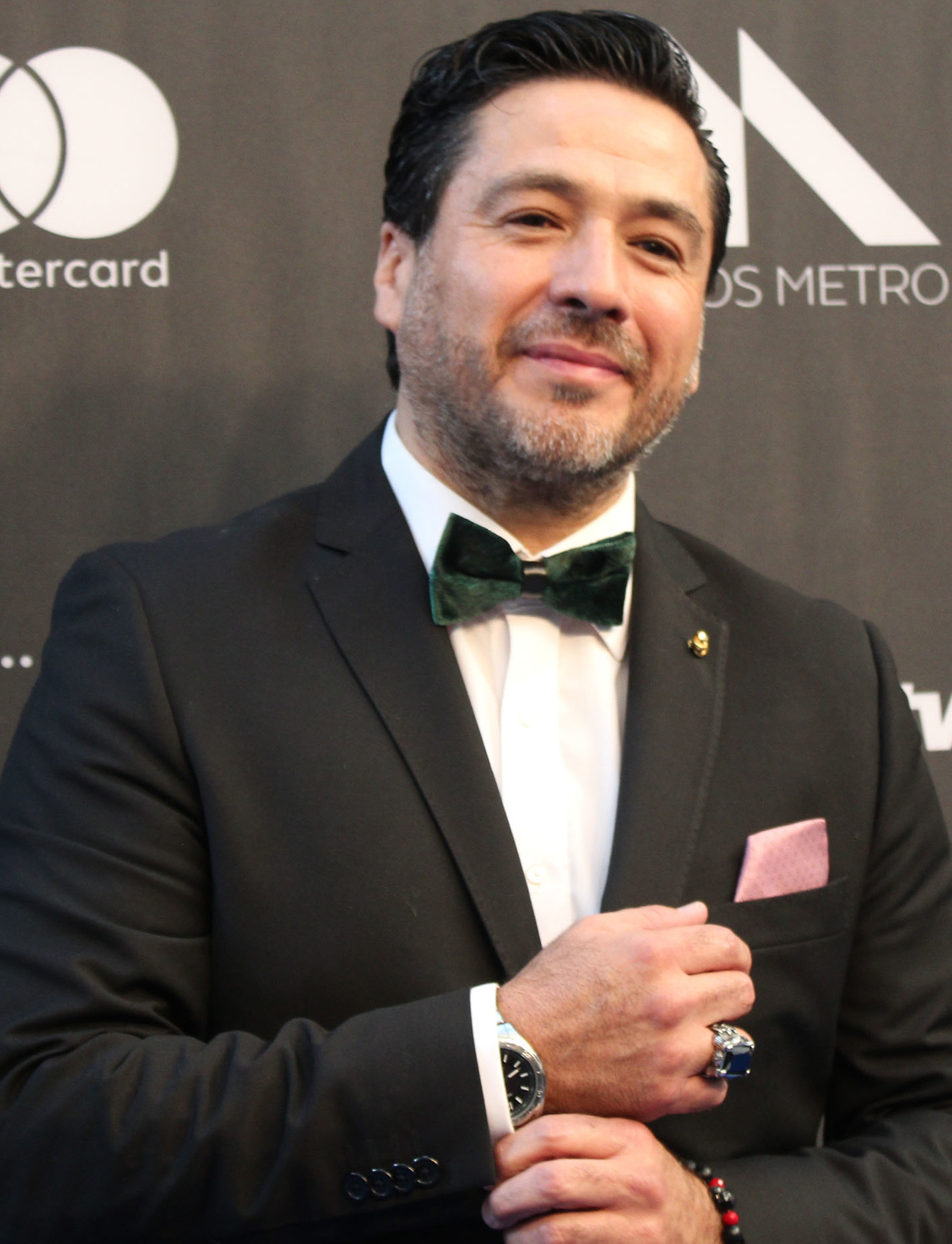
Esteban Soberanes

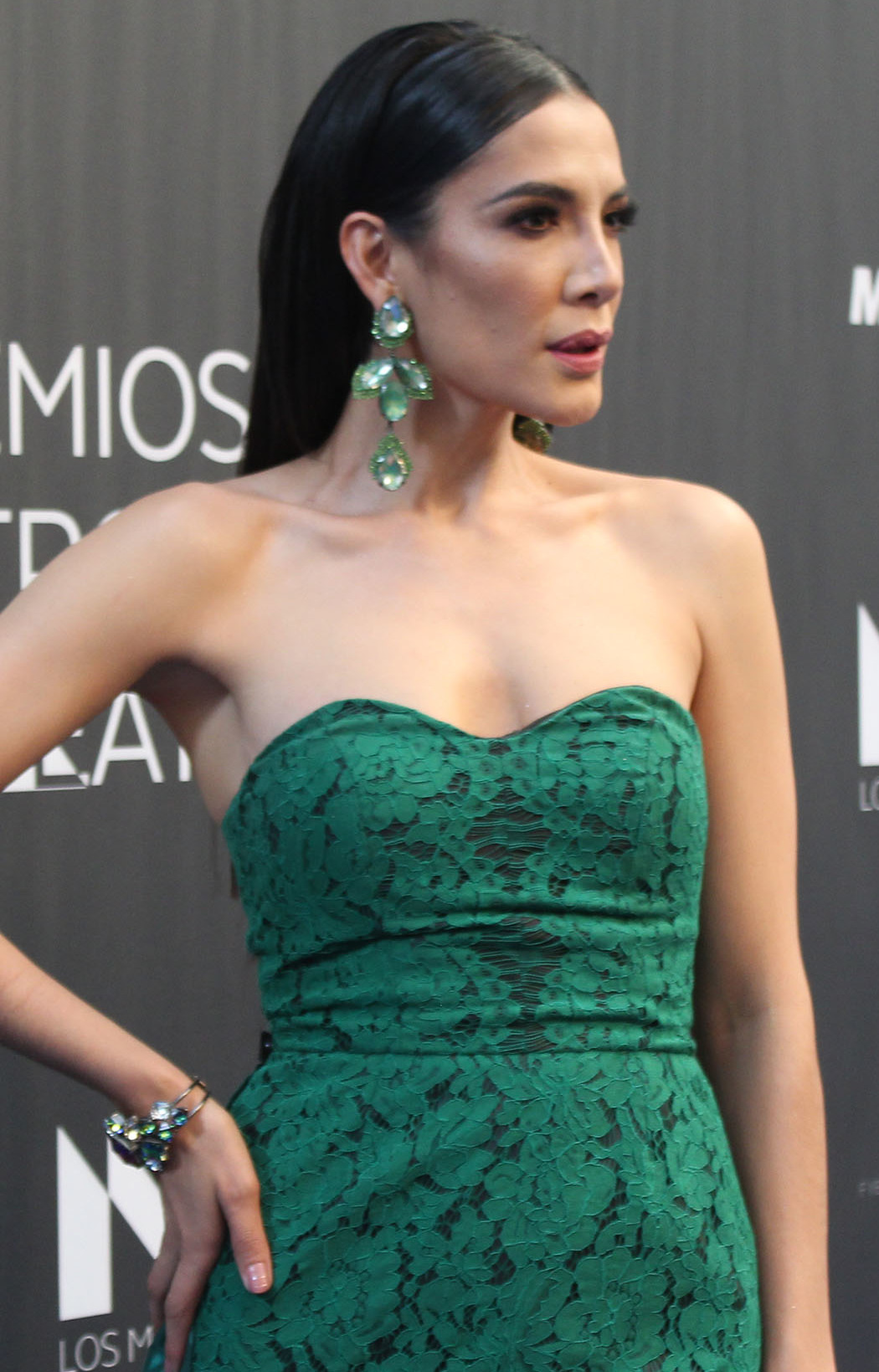
María del Carmen Félix

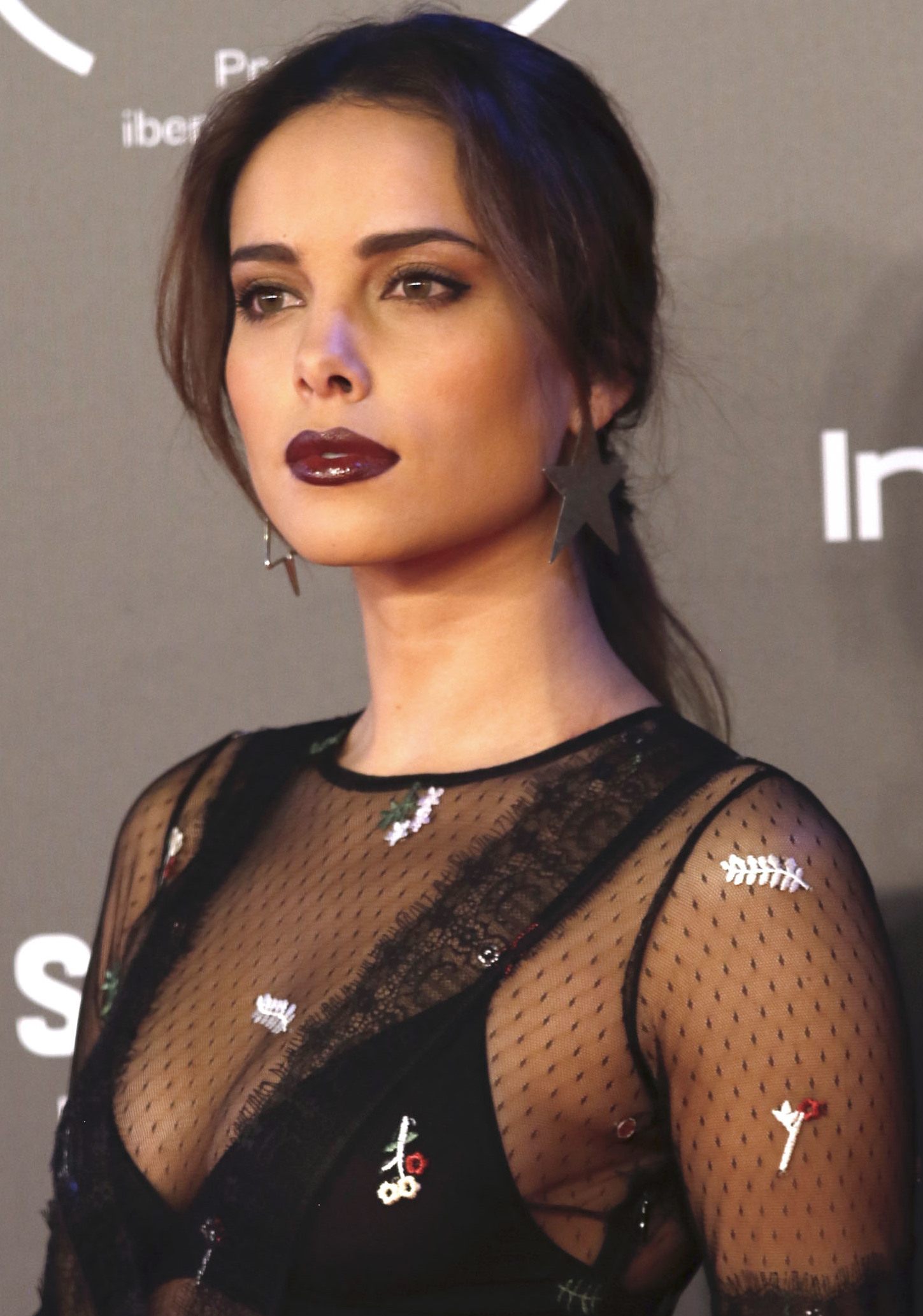
Vanesa Restrepo

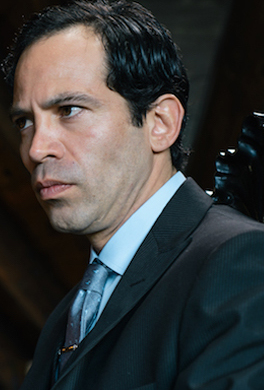
Mauricio Isaac

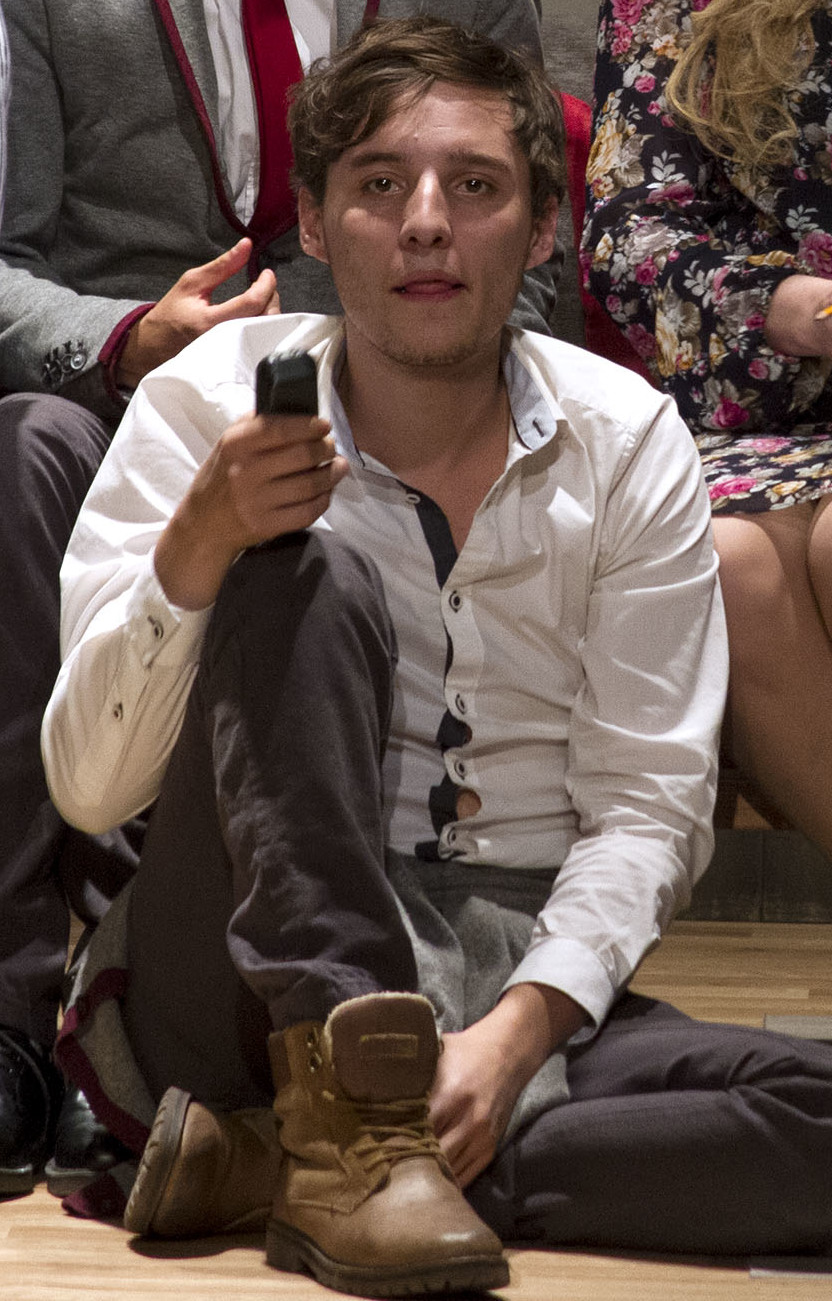
Mauro Sánchez Navarro

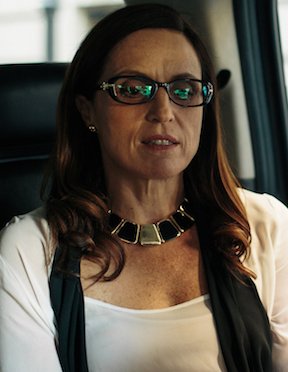
Claudette Maillé

Main and recurring cast in the first season

The following is a list of actors, and the characters they played, who appeared in the Telemundo series La Doña.

== Cast and characters ==
=== Main ===
- Aracely Arámbula as Altagracia Sandoval Ramos "La Doña", is the main protagonist of the series, she is the owner of the construction company Sandoval, a company that robbed Lázaro, her ex-husband, and Mónica's mother. Antagonistic protagonist.
- Danna Paola as Mónica Eulalia Hernández Sandoval, is Lazaro's non-biological daughter, and Altagracia's daughter. She was killed by Braulio for a bomb necklace. (season 1; guest season 2)
- Andrea Martí as Regina Sandoval Ramos, Altagracia's sister, and Isabela's mother.
- Diego Soldano as Daniel Llamas, creator and director of a foundation of raped women, former member of the Monkeys' group and Altagracia's one bodyguards.
- José María Galeano as Braulio Padilla / Ernesto Palmar, Altagracia's former right hand and bodyguard. Diego's father, Don Manuel's son, Main male villain and primary antagonist of the series. In Season 2 it is revealed that he survived being run over and saved by Don Alfonso becoming Saul's and Monica's Murder. He was killed by Altagracia along with his son Diego by the bomb he had inside his abdomen to turn him into a bomb man, as revenge for killing Monica with the bomb necklace.
- Mayra Sierra as Karen Velarde, Veracruz officer in charge of helping Saúl catch rapists.
- Simone Victoria as Magdalena Sánchez, tenant and friend of the Aguirre family.
- Claudio Roca as Adolfo Mendoza, the doctor who attends Monica's dad, and who has a romantic interest in her.
- Aquiles Cervantes as Matamoros, Altagracia's personal bodyguard and right man after Braulio. Criminal. He was murdered by Diego and the Arcoiris. Villain.
- Michelle Olvera (Season 1) / Paola Albo (Season 2) as Isabela Sandoval, Altagracia's niece, and Regina's daughter. In season two Olvera was replaced by Paola Albo. She was murdered by Eleonora.
- Leo Deluglio as Diego Padilla Puertas, Braulio's son and Don Manuel's grandson. He was killed by Altagracia by placing the bomb inside his abdomen, turning him into a bomb man, instantly killing him and his father Braulio, as revenge for killing Mónica with a bomb necklace and murdering Matamoros.

==== Introduced in season one ====
- David Chocarro as Saúl José Aguirre, is a lawyer who defends the rights of women who have been raped and abused. In Season 2, he is murdered by Ernesto (Braulio). (season 1)
- Rebecca Jones as Doña Yesenia Sandoval, she is Altagracia and Regina's aunt, she taught Altagracia all about witchcraft. She was killed by Braulio to save Mónica. (season 1)
- Odiseo Bichir as Don Lázaro Hernández, is Monica's non-biological father. He dies of a heart attack (season 1)
- Gabriela Roel as Doña Azucena de Aguirre, Saúl's mother. (season 1)
- Juan Ríos Cantú as Rafael Cabral, Leticia's husband and Emiliano's father, Don Alfonso's deceased son. He is a former member and leader of the Monkeys' group. He is the fourth and last victim of Altagracia, who slit his throat in cold blood, killing him as revenge for her mother's death. Main male villain. (season 1)
- Daniela Bascopé as Valeria Puertas de Padilla, she is a corrupt judge manipulated by Altagracia. She is also Braulio's wife and Diego's mother. (season 1)
- Mauricio Isaac as Justino López, Valeria employee and friend of Sául. (season 1)
- Fátima Molina as Lidya Corona, Mónica's best friend. (season 1)
- Vanesa Restrepo as Ximena Urdaneta, Saúl's girlfriend. She was killed by Braulio. (season 1)
- Juan Carlos Remolina as Miguel Preciado, Mauricio's deceased brother former member of the Monkeys' group, and Altagracia's rapist. He is the first victim of Altagracia. Villain (season 1)
- María del Carmen Félix as Leticia de Cabral, Rafael's wife, and Emiliano's mother. (season 1)
- Manuel Blejerman as Coronel Alejandro Céspedes, Fernanda and Sebastian's deceased father, former member of the Monkeys' group, Cesar's murder and Altagracia's rapist. He is the second victim of Altagracia. Villain. (season 1)
- Esteban Soberanes as Francisco Vega, Romelia's deceased brother, he is former member of the Monkeys' group. Assassin of Altagracia's father. He is the third victim of Altagracia. Villain. (season 1)
- Gavo Figueira as Jorge Moya, neighbour and friend of the Aguirre family. (season 1)
- Roberto Quijano as Gabino Domínguez, a policeman obsessed with Mónica. Matamoros burned him alive on Altagracia's orders as revenge for raping and pushing Monica. Villain. (season 1)
- René García as Guillermo Contreras, León's deceased brother, Yesenia's boyfriend, and Altagracia's employer. He dies buried alive (season 1)
- Mario Morán as Emiliano Cabral, Rafael and Leticia's son and Don Alfonso's grandson. He dies jumping from a bridge due to a motorcycle accident. Villain. (season 1)
- Giselle Kuri as Margarita Vásquez, she is a defender of Saul, who was raped and kidnapped by Miguel Preciado. (season 1)
- Gonzalo Guzmán as Marcos Beltrán, Isabela's boyfriend. (season 1)
- Rafael Sánchez Navarro as Don Jaime Aguirre, Saúl's father. Killed by Braulio. (season 1)

==== Introduced in season two ====
- Carlos Ponce as León Contreras, Guillermo's late brother (season 2)
- David Zepeda as José Luis Navarrete (season 2)
- Maricela González as Eunice Lara "La Felina" (season 2)
- Kika Edgar as Romelia Vega, Francisco's late sister (season 2)
- Patricia Reyes Spíndola, as Florencia Molina, Noelia's mother (season 2)
- Alejandra Barros as Eleonora Rojas de Navarrete, Jose Luis' deceased wife. She commits suicide after killing Isabela upon discovering that his son Lucho is the leader of the Arcoiris. (season 2)
- Paola Fernández as Noelia Molina (season 2)
- José Sefami as Don Alfonso Cabral, Rafael's late father and Emiliano's late grandfather. Who helped and saved Braulio to fake his death after being run over by the feminist demonstration. He was murdered by Altagracia. (season 2)
- Fernanda Borches as Fátima Escamilla de Contreras (season 2)
- Alexa Martín as Fernanda Céspedes, Alejandro's late daughter. She was killed by Braulio (season 2)
- Alberto Casanova as Mauricio Preciado, Miguel's late brother. He was kidnapped and killed by Altagracia (season 2)
- Bernardo Flores as Lucho Navarrete Rojas, Eleonora and Jose Luis's son and leader of the Arcoiris. (season 2)
- Agustin Arguello as Eduardo Pérez Urresti (season 2)
- Diego Escalona as Ángel Contreras Escamilla, Fatima and León's son. He was killed by Lucho in a car accident. (season 2)
- Cuauhtli Jiménez as Nando (season 2)
- Rafael Ernesto as Sebastián Céspedes, Alejandro's late son. He was killed by Braulio. (season 2)
- Juan Pablo De Santiago(season 2)
- Christian Ramos as Cisco (season 2)
- Leandro Lima as Thiago (season 2)
- Eric del Castillo as Don Ricardo Vidal (season 2)

=== Recurring and guest ===
- Carlos Torres as Felipe Valenzuela, Altagracia's ex-husband. He was killed by Rafael on Altagracia's orders. (season 1)
- Bárbara Méndez as Elena, Justino's wife. (season 1)
- Claudette Maillé as La Delegada, Mónica's cellmate. (season 1)
- Mauro Sánchez Navarro as Manuel, Emiliano's friend. (season 1)
- Lion Bagnis as César Otero, Altagracia's boyfriend when she was a teenager, he was killed by the Monkeys Group. Shot to death by Alejandro Cespedes (season 1)
- Geraldine Zinat as Mrs. Ramos de Sandoval Altagracia and Regina's mother, she was killed by the Monkeys Group when Rafael Cabral slits her throat. (season 1)
- Fabián Peña as Mr. Sandoval, Altagracia and Regina's father, he was killed by the Monkeys Group. He was shot to death by Francisco Vega. (season 1)
- Luis Xavier as Don Manuel Padilla, Braulio's father and Diego's grandfather. He was killed by his own son Braulio. (Season 2)
- Francisco Rubio as Andrés Roldán (season 2)
- Matías Novoa as Amado Casillas Leal "El Águila Azul" (season 2)
