= Mario Morán =

Mexican actor

- Born: Mario Morán; August 6, 1992 (age 34); Puebla, Puebla, Mexico
- Occupation: Actor
- Years active: 2012–present

Mario Morán (August 6, 1992, Puebla) is a Mexican actor of television and films.

== Biographic dates ==
He is the youngest of 3 siblings. An older brother and a sister.

== Career ==
He debuted in theater staging "Sexo Sexo Sexo, the musical", with which it was presented in two successful seasons in Puebla and with which visited more than 70 public schools to raise awareness about responsible sexuality in young people. Shortly after he acted with the same work in Mexico City at the Forum Sylvia Pasquel in a 16-week season, equaling the same success as in Puebla. In addition, this work went on tour to cities like Villahermosa, Cancún and Guanajuato, among others.

On television he has participated in Televisa unit as "La Rosa de Guadalupe" and "Como dice el dicho". He starred in the film "Shhh!" premiered at the International Film Festival Acapulco (FICA) in 2013. He also appeared in "No Manches Frida" next to Martha Higareda and Omar Chaparro.

He played the role of Jorge Perez in the soap opera "Pasión y Poder" in Televisa.

He plays the role of Emiliano Cabral in the Soap Opera "La Doña" produced by Argos studios for Telemundo.

He will also appear in the film "Mas Alla de La Herencia" alongside Carmen Aub.

== Filmography ==
Television roles and films performance
Year	Title	Roles	Notes
2013–2015	La rosa de Guadalupe	Moisés David Walter	Episode: "La oportunidad de amar" Episode: "El regalo que jamás llegó" Episode: "El juego"
2013–2016	Como dice el dicho	Various roles	5 episodes
2014	Shhh!	Víctor	Film
2016	Pasión y poder	Jorge	Recurring role; 45 episodes
2016	No manches Frida	Cristóbal	Film
2016–2017	La Doña	Emiliano Cabral	Series regular (season 1); 55 episodes
2017–2018	Muy padres	Alan de Garay	Series regular; 98 episodes
2018	Hijas de la luna	Mauricio	Main role; 73 episodes
2019	No manches Frida 2	Cristóbal	Film
2019	Dani Who?	JP	Series regular; 8 episodes
2022	Los ricos también lloran	Diego Fernández	Series regular
2023	Senda prohibida	Ernesto Cueva	Recurring role
2023	Se llamaba Pedro Infante	Pedro Infante	Main role
2024	La historia de Juana	Felipe Bravo	Series regular
2025	Monteverde	Franco León	Series regular
2025	Pecados inconfesables	Antonio Grajales	
2026	Sabor a ti	Mariano Romero	Main role
