= List of programs broadcast by Nickelodeon (CIS and Baltics) =

This is a list of programs broadcast that are currently airing on Nickelodeon (CIS and Baltics).

== Programming ==
Title	Premiere date	Source(s)
SpongeBob SquarePants	January 1, 2000	
Paw Patrol	November 11, 2013	
Blaze and the Monster Machines	January 2015	
The Loud House	May 28, 2016	
Hunter Street	September 18, 2017	
Lego City Adventures	October 26, 2019	
The Casagrandes	March 24, 2020	
Blue's Clues & You!	April 4, 2020	
The Adventures of Paddington	July 11, 2020	
It's Pony	July 11, 2020	
Danger Force	October 18, 2020	
Baby Shark's Big Show!	January 13, 2021	
Tyler Perry's Young Dylan	February 6, 2021	
Side Hustle	March 15, 2021	
Santiago of the Seas	April 24, 2021	
Kamp Koral: SpongeBob's Under Years	July 5, 2021	
The Smurfs	October 3, 2021	
Middlemost Post	October 18, 2021	
Rugrats (2021)	November 29, 2021	
The Patrick Star Show	January 30, 2022	

=== Reruns of ended series ===
Title	Date(s) reran	Source(s)
Avatar: The Last Airbender	January 1, 2006 – December 14, 2022	
iCarly	May 1, 2009 – December 14, 2022	
Big Time Rush	June 19, 2010 – December 14, 2022	
Victorious	December 4, 2010 – December 14, 2022	
Teenage Mutant Ninja Turtles	November 25, 2012 – December 14, 2022	
Sam & Cat	June 8, 2013 – December 14, 2022	
The Thundermans	April 12, 2014 – December 14, 2022	
Nicky, Ricky, Dicky & Dawn	December 6, 2014 – December 14, 2022	
Henry Danger	January 9, 2015 – December 14, 2022	
Game Shakers	December 31, 2015 – December 14, 2022	
Pig Goat Banana Cricket	September 3, 2016 – December 14, 2022	
Rise of the Teenage Mutant Ninja Turtles	September 23, 2018 — December 14, 2022	
Dorg Van Dango	January 18, 2021 ― December 14, 2022	
Drama Club	October 16, 2021 ― December 14, 2022	

== Former programming ==
=== Animated series ===
- Rugrats (November 15, 1998 – February 16, 2018)
- Hey Arnold! (November 15, 1998 – February 16, 2018)
- CatDog (May 1, 1999 – February 1, 1999)
- The Ren & Stimpy Show (1998-2005, 2008-2010, 2013–14)
- Rocko's Modern Life (1998-2009, 2014)
- Aaahh!!! Real Monsters (1998-2005)
- The Adventures of Jimmy Neutron, Boy Genius (February 8, 2003 – November 1, 2020)
- My Life as a Teenage Robot (May 3, 2004 – April 3, 2016)
- Danny Phantom (January 15, 2006 – January 4, 2020)
- Kappa Mikey (June 2008 — February 26, 2010)
- Catscratch (2007-2010)
- The Fairly OddParents (December 3, 2007 — 2008; March 1, 2010 — December 27, 2020)
- Wayside (2008-2010)
- El Tigre: The Adventures of Manny Rivera (November 8, 2008 — February 28, 2010)
- The Mighty B! (February 16, 2009 — March 30, 2016)
- Tak and the Power of Juju (June 6, 2009 – May 2010)
- Fanboy & Chum Chum (2010-2020)
- Planet Sheen (May 14, 2011 — October 15, 2015)
- Winx Club (2011-2016)
- T.U.F.F. Puppy (September 5, 2011 — February 23, 2020)
- Robot and Monster (April 1, 2013 — March 2, 2018)
- Sanjay and Craig (September 20, 2013 – October 30, 2022)
- Breadwinners (October 18, 2014 – November 27, 2022)
- Harvey Beaks (June 13, 2015 ― February 1, 2019)
- Get Blake! (2015-2021)
- Bunsen Is a Beast (June 5, 2017 — December 30, 2018)
- Welcome to the Wayne (December 11, 2017 — December 31, 2019)
- Ollie's Pack (September 26, 2020 ― March 20, 2022)
- The Barbarian and the Troll (October 16, 2021 – February 2022)

=== Live-action series ===
- All That (1998-2005, 2020–21)
- Unfabulous (2008-2015)
- Drake & Josh (2008-2015)
- Romeo! (2008-2010)
- Mr. Meaty (2008)
- True Jackson, VP (2010-2012)
- Cousins for Life (2019–20)
- Noobees (April 1, 2019 – March 31, 2021)
- Overlord and the Underwoods (2022)

=== Preschool series ===
- Dora the Explorer (2004–2018)
- Peppa Pig (Autumn 2004 — February 27, 2009)
- Go, Diego, Go! (2006–2016)
- Wonder Pets! (2007–2016)
- Team Umizoomi (2010–2016)
- Bubble Guppies (2011–2021)
- KikoRiki (2012–2016)
- The Fixies (2015–2017)
- Tickety Toc (2012–2015)
- Rusty Rivets (2016–2020)
- Nella the Princess Knight (2017–2020)
- Sunny Day (2018–2020)
- Top Wing (2018–2021)
- 44 Cats (February 18, 2019 – 2021)
- Butterbean's Café (2019–2021)
- Abby Hatcher (June 8, 2019 — 2021)
- Corn & Peg (2020–21)
- Deer Squad (2021)
