= José María Galeano =

Spanish actor

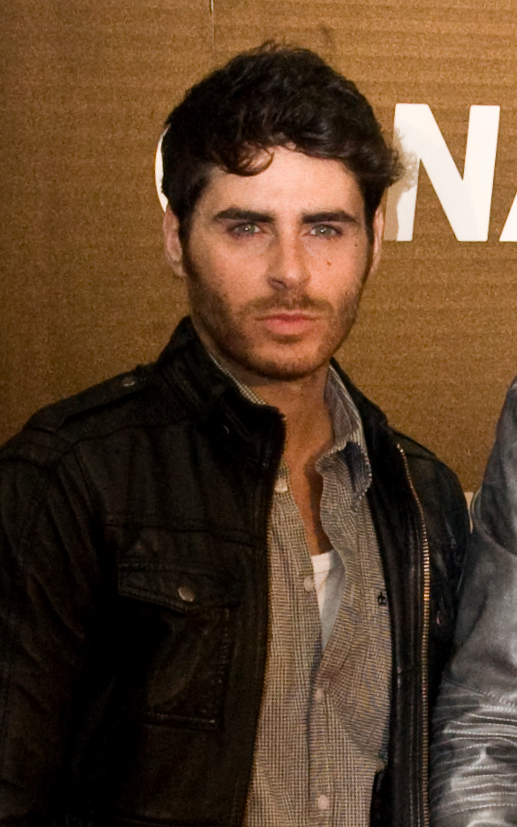
- Galeano at the photocall of Alice in Wonderland in 2010
- Born: 18 November 1979 (age 46); Algeciras, Spain
- Education: University of Granada
- Occupation: Actor
- Years active: 2005–present
- Television: Que te perdone Dios; La Doña
- Spouse: María Mirazo (m. 2021)

José María Galeano (born 18 November 1979) is a Spanish film and television actor, best known for his roles as Father Tomás in Televisa's daytime drama Que te perdone Dios, and as Braulio Padilla in Telemundo's La Doña.

== Biography ==
Galeano studied political science and sociology at the University of Granada. He later moved to Madrid to study acting, and lived there for 11 years.

== Filmography ==
=== Film roles ===
| Year | Title | Roles | Notes |
|---|---|---|---|
| 2011 | Bad Night | The Guy | Short film |
| 2012 | Y la muerte lo seguía | Fred Carlson | Short film |

=== Television roles ===
| Year | Title | Roles | Notes |
|---|---|---|---|
| 2009 | Hospital Central | Daniel Lucena | 9 episodes |
| 2015 | Que te perdone Dios | Father Tomás | Series regular; 66 episodes |
| 2016–2020 | La Doña | Braulio Padilla | Series regular (season 1); 113 episodes |
| 2018 | José José, el príncipe de la canción | Javier de la Garza | Recurring role; 7 episodes |
| 2018 | Luis Miguel: The Series | Jaume Torrens | Episode: "Decídete" |
| 2019 | This Is Silvia Pinal | Enrique Rodríguez Alday "El Güero" | 2 episodes |
| 2019 | Bolívar | Felipe Martínez | |
| 2019 | El Dragón: Return of a Warrior | Leopoldo Santamarina | 2 episodes |
| 2021 | Si nos dejan | Samuel | Recurring role |
| 2024 | Top Chef VIP | Himself | Contestant (season 3) |
| 2025 | La Jefa | Duque Medina | |

== Awards and nominations ==
| Year | Award | Category | Work | Result |
|---|---|---|---|---|
| 2017 | 6th Your World Awards | The Best Bad Boy | La Doña | Won |
