= Sandra Destenave =

Mexican actress, model and hostess

- Born: Sandra Irene Destenave Fernández; November 6, 1972 (age 53); Chihuahua, Mexico
- Education: Universidad Autónoma de La Laguna
- Occupations: Actress, model, hostess
- Years active: 1995-2000 (model); 2000-present (actress)
- Spouse: Felipe Gómez (2013-present)
- Partner: Jorge Luis Pila (2011)
- Children: Luciana Gómez Destenave (b. 2014)

Sandra Destenave (born Sandra Irene Destenave Fernández on November 6, 1972, in Chihuahua, Mexico) is a Mexican actress, model and hostess.

== Early life ==
Destenave was born on November 6, 1972, in Chihuahua, Mexico. In 1995 she became Miss Coahuila and placed second in the national competition. In Mexico City she served for several years as a model for Contempo agency, featuring in several advertising campaigns.

In 1995 she graduated in psychology from the Universidad Autónoma de La Laguna. She studied film, Theatre and Drama in the Lumière Institute and later entered the Televisa Center for Arts Education (CEA).

== Filmography ==
Telenovelas, Series, Films, TV Show
Year	Title	Role	Notes
2000-05	Mujer, casos de la vida real		TV series
2001	Amigas y rivales		
2002	Espacio 2002	Herself/hostess	TV show
2002-03	Clase 406		
2002-03	Las Vías del Amor	Mireya	Special appearance
2003	Espacio 2003	Herself/hostess	TV show
2003	Niña Amada Mía		
2003	Amy, la niña de la mochila azul	Graciela	Supporting role
2004	Amarte es mi Pecado		
2004	Espacio 2004	Herself/hostess	TV show
2004	XH Gente	Herself/hostess	TV show
2004	Promesa básica		Film
2005	Partes usadas		Film
2005	De volada	Herself/hostess	TV show
2006	Decisiones		TV series
2006	Marina	Adriana de Alarcón	Antagonist
2006	Cinco minutos de espera		Film
2007	Luna roja		Film
2007	A partir de ti		Film
2008	Bajo amenaza: 42 km de angustia		Film
2008	Vivir sin ti	América	Supporting role
2008-09	Lo que la gente cuenta		TV series
2008-09	Secretos del alma	Cecilia de Alcazár	Antagonist
2010	A cada quien su santo		TV series
2010	Ella y el candidato		Film
2010-11	Aurora	Natalia Suárez	Supporting role
2011	Emperatriz	Marlene Martínez de León	Supporting role
2012	Relaciones peligrosas	Carmen de Blanco	Supporting Antagonist
2012-13	El rostro de la venganza	Nun Luisa / Marcia Rey	Special participation
2013	11-11: En mi cuadra nada cuadra	Patricia	Special participation
2013-14	Marido en alquiler	Esther Salas de Palmer	Supporting role
2015-2016	¿Quién es quién?	Fabiola Carbajal	Antagonist
2017	Muy padres	Silvia Juárez de Villagrana	Supporting role
