= Mariachi Gringo =

- Directed by: Tom Gustafson
- Written by: Cory Krueckeberg
- Produced by: Cory Krueckeberg; Tom Gustafson; Rafael Cuervo; Alejandra Cardenas; Ramiro Ruiz
- Starring: Shawn Ashmore; Martha Higareda; Lila Downs
- Cinematography: Kira Kelly
- Edited by: Cory Krueckeberg; Jennifer Lee
- Music by: Tim Sandusky
- Production companies: Sin Sentido Films; SPEAKproductions
- Release date: March 2, 2012 (Miami)
- Running time: 107 minutes
- Countries: Mexico; United States
- Languages: English; Spanish

Mariachi Gringo is a 2012 romantic comedy film directed by Tom Gustafson and written by Cory Krueckeberg. It was produced by Speak Productions and Sin Sentido Films. The film stars Shawn Ashmore, Martha Higareda, Lila Downs, Fernando Becerril, Kate Burton, Tom Wopat and Adriana Barraza.

Mariachi Gringo opened the 2012 Miami International Film Festival and won the Mayahuel Awards for Best Film & Best Actress for Martha Higareda at the 2012 Guadalajara International Film Festival.

== Synopsis ==
Edward (Shawn Ashmore), a small-town American slacker, meets Albert, an old Mexican man who was once a mariachi. Enchanted by traditional Mexican music, Edward moves to Guadalajara, where he plans to become a mariachi himself. He becomes friends with Lilia (Martha Higareda) and develops unrequited feelings for her. Lilia helps him to advance his dream and enlists the help of Sophia (Lila Downs), the lead singer of a small mariachi band, to teach him.

Lilia herself has the dream to leave Guadalajara and study oceanography, but is constantly putting it off to help her mother run a traditional restaurant.

Edward is then recruited by a prestigious mariachi band, which puts him at odds with Lilia, who feels he's betraying his dream to be a small-town mariachi, selling out to a flashy, big-name band. During his first live show he discovers he was only included in the band as a gimmick and he quits, enraged. He tries to return to his native town, only to find out he doesn't fit anymore. Upon returning to Guadalajara, he learns that Lilia finally left. He then joins Sophia's band, becoming a small-town, regular mariachi as he always wanted.

== Cast ==
Actor	Role
Shawn Ashmore	Edward
Martha Higareda	Lilia
Kate Burton	Anne
Adriana Barraza	Magdalena
Fernando Becerril	Alberto
Lila Downs	Sophia
Tom Wopat	Ron
Yareli Arizmendi	Rosario
Deanna Dunagan	Monica
Raúl Méndez	Jorge
Jorge Luis Moreno	Rough Youngster
Teresa Ruiz	Ashlee

== Critical reception ==
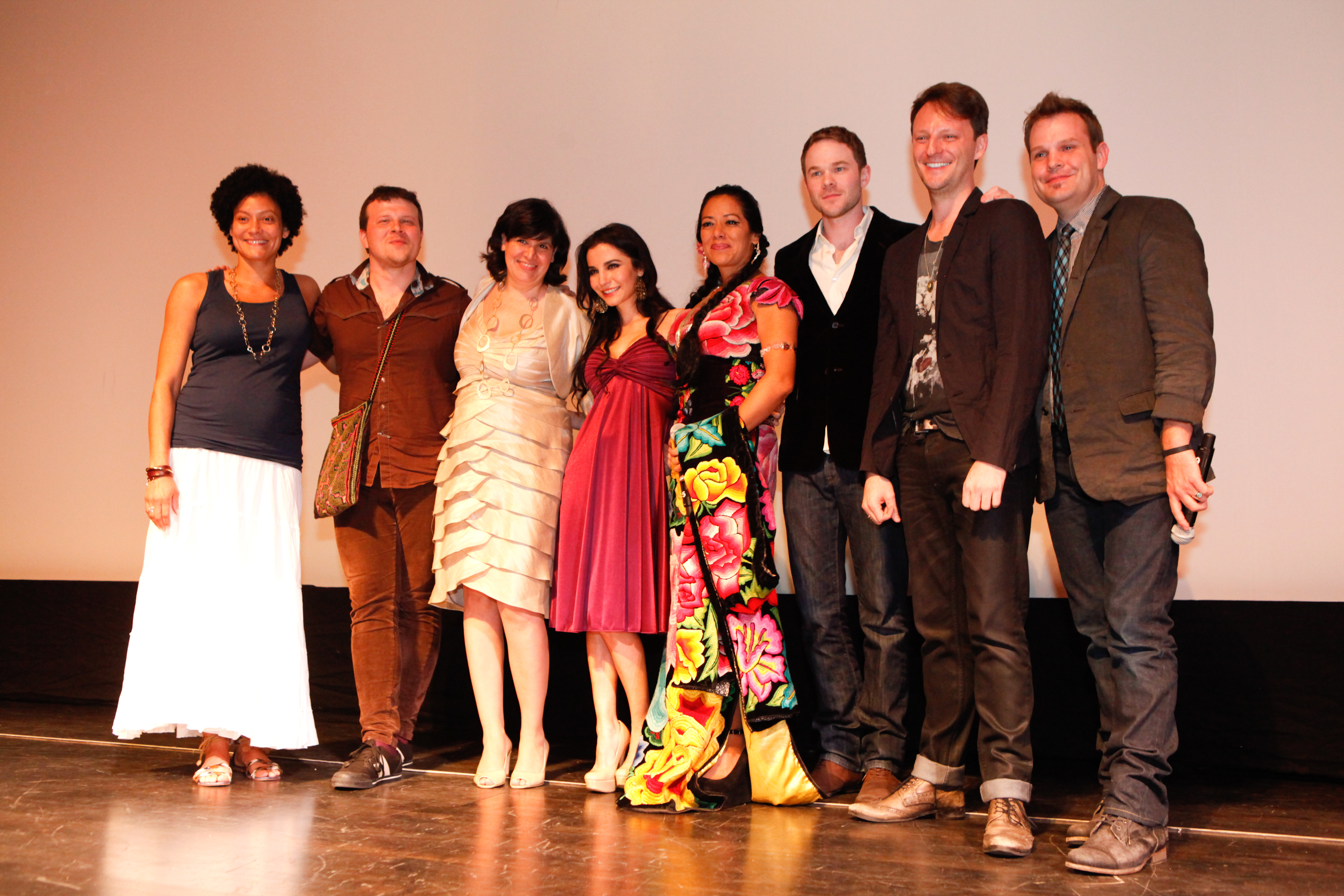
The cast & crew of Mariachi Gringo at the 2012 Miami International Film Festival Opening Night World Premiere of the film

Mariachi Gringo received mixed reviews from film critics. On the review aggregator website Rotten Tomatoes, the film has a 43% approval rating, based on seven reviews. Appraisal was generally directed at the direction, music, and performances by some of the cast, in particular Shawn Ashmore in the lead role.
