= Unspeakable Sins =

2025 Mexican thriller drama television series

- Promotional release poster
- Spanish: Pecados inconfesables
- Genre: Drama; Thriller
- Written by: Leticia López Margalli; Guillermo Ríos
- Directed by: Pablo Ambrosini; Felipe Aguilar Dulcé
- Starring: Zuria Vega; Andrés Baida; Erik Hayser
- Country of origin: Mexico
- Original language: Spanish
- No. of episodes: 18

Production
- Cinematography: Jeronimo Rodriguez-Garcia
- Camera setup: Multi-camera
- Running time: 34–45 min
- Production company: Mar Abierto Productions

Original release
- Network: Netflix
- Release: July 30, 2025

Unspeakable Sins (Spanish: Pecados inconfesables) is a 2025 Mexican thriller drama television series created by Leticia López Margalli and Guillermo Ríos. Produced under Mar Abierto Productions, it stars Zuria Vega, Andrés Baida and Erik Hayser. The series was premiered on Netflix on July 30, 2025.

== Plot ==
Helena, a woman trapped in an abusive marriage to powerful businessman Claudio, conspires with her lover and high-class escort, Iván, to entrap and blackmail her husband. When their plan spirals into a violent confrontation and Claudio goes missing, Helena must fight to survive.

== Cast ==
- Zuria Vega as Helena Rivas, alias Emma, Claudio's second wife
- Andrés Baida as Iván Diaz
- Erik Hayser as Claudio Martínez
- Manuel Masalva as Octavio Martínez
- Adriana Louvier as Fedra Baar
- Ana Sofía Gatica as Livia Martínez
- Mario Morán as Antonio Grajales
- Ivonne Montero as Detective Sofía Curiel
- Regina Pavón as Ximena Baar
- Armando Hernández as El Magic
- Eugenio Siller as Pablo Morales
- Raquel Martínez as Dora, trans lover of Rafael
- Roberto Quijanoas as Rafael Barrientos

== Production ==
=== Development ===
The series was officially commissioned by Netflix, with Pablo Ambrosini and Felipe Aguilar Dulcé serving as directors, while the script was penned by Leticia López Margalli and Guillermo Ríos. Mar Abierto Productions managed the production.

=== Filming ===
The principal photography of the series concluded in 2024. The filming took place in and near Mexico City.

== Music ==
Unspeakable Sins

Soundtrack album by María Leon, Yahir
- Released: July 25, 2025
- Genre: Soundtrack
- Length: 3:42
- Language: Spanish
- Label: OCESA Seitrack

The soundtrack for Unspeakable Sins is sung by María Leon and Yahir.

Tracklisting
No.	Title	Artist	Length
1.	"Hoy Tengo Ganas De Ti"	María Leon, Yahir	03:42
Total length:			03:42

== Release ==
The trailer of the series was released on July 1, 2025. The series was made available to stream exclusively on Netflix on July 30, 2025.

== Reception ==
Juan Pablo Russo from EscribiendoCine rated the series 5/10. The series was also reviewed by Mindies.
