= Clara Tiezzi =

Brazilian actress (born 1999)

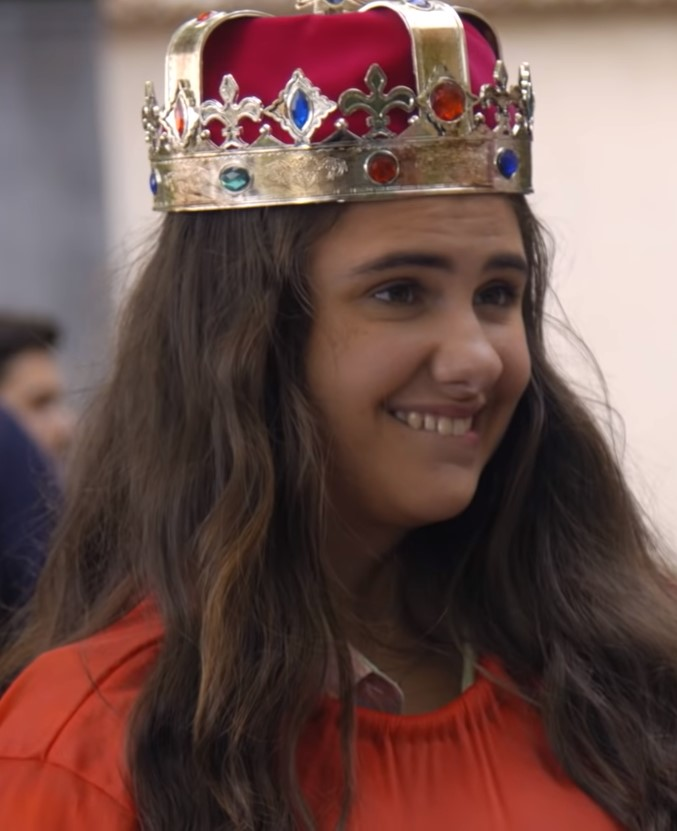
- Clara Tiezzi in her Instagram post
- Born: Clara Galiani Tiezzi Dias Vaz; 4 July 1999 (age 26); Brasília, Brazil
- Occupation: Actress
- Years active: 2007–present

Clara Galiani Tiezzi Dias Vaz (Brasília, 14 June 1999) is a Brazilian actress. She is known for being the protagonist of the children's series Teca na TV and for her prominent role as Mabi in the telenovela Ti Ti Ti; the latter secured her five awards in six categories, voted winner overall. In 2018, she was cast in the Nickelodeon Latin America series Noobees, the first Tiezzi's international work, whose character was also voiced by her for airing in Brazil.

== Career ==
Daughter of lawyers Vanessa Tiezzi and Carlos Otávio Dias Vaz, she began her career at the age of four in the theater, after transferring with her family from Brasília to Niterói. Debuted on television in 2007, starring as Teca in the children's series Teca na TV, which was aired on Canal Futura. At the end of the same year, she participated in the Rede Globo year-end special O Segredo da Princesa Lili as Irvana. In 2009, she made a cameo appearance in Malhação.

In 2010, she was cast in Ti Ti Ti as Mabi, whose character was inspired by American blogger Tavi Gevinson, teen fashion icon. Her performance in the plot resulted in several awards: Among them, highlighted in the Brazil Art Quality Award and Contigo TV Award, for the category of 'Best child/Juvenile actress' and 'Best child Actor or Actress', respectively Two years later, she was cast at Rede Record to portray the character Mariana in the telenovela Rebelde. In 2013, she returned to Rede Globo on the 21st season of Malhação, portraying the character Clara.

Also in 2013, she debuted as film actress in Confissões de Adolescente as Karina, a girl who shifts style after the beginning of the relationship. The film is based on the book of same name by Maria Mariana which was also adapted into a play and television series in the 1990s. Two years later, she was back in a film in É Fada!.

In 2018, working in Colombia in Spanish, she debuted in her first international work in television in the Nickelodeon Latin America series Noobees, playing the role Laura Calles; a character who was also dubbed by herself in Portuguese to be shown in Brazil.

== Filmography ==
=== Television ===
Ano	Title	Role	Notes	Ref
2007–09	Teca na TV	Teca		
2007	O Segredo da Princesa Lili	Irvana (young)	End of year special	
2009	Malhação	Letícia's Friend	Season 16	
2010	Ti Ti Ti	Maria Beatriz Spina (Mabi)		
2012	Rebelde	Mariana	Episódios: "1 de agosto–12 de outubro"	
2013–14	Malhação Casa Cheia	Clara	Season 21	
2018–2020	Noobees	Laura Calles		
2019	Férias em Família	Maria Isabel (Bel)		
2020	Éramos Seis	Emiliana Amaral Marcondes de Bueno (Adult)	Episodes: "march 26-27"	
2023	Vai na Fé	Talita	Episodes: "june 01-02"	

=== Film ===
Year	Title	Role	Ref
2014	Confissões de Adolescente	Karina	
2016	É Fada!	Priscila	

Dubbing

Year	Title	Role	Ref
2019	Noobees	Laura Calles	

== Awards and nominations ==
Year	Award	Category	Role	Result	Ref
2010	Prêmio Arte Qualidade Brasil	Melhor atriz infantil/juvenil	Mabi on Ti Ti Ti	Won	
2010	Prêmio Melhores da Revista da TV	Revelação	Mabi on Ti Ti Ti	Won	
2011	Minha Novela	Atriz infantil	Mabi on Ti Ti Ti	Won	
2011	Minha Novela	Revelação (votação popular)	Mabi on Ti Ti Ti	Won	
2011	Melhores do Ano	Melhor ator ou atriz mirim	Mabi on Ti Ti Ti	Won	
2011	Prêmio Contigo! de TV	Melhor atriz infantil	Mabi on Ti Ti Ti	Won	
