= Thirty, Single and Fantastic =

Treintona, soltera y fantástica
- Directed by: Chava Cartas
- Written by: Juan Carlos Garzón; Angélica Gudiño
- Based on: Treintona, soltera y fantástica by Juana Inés Dehesa
- Produced by: José Alberto López
- Starring: Bárbara Mori
- Cinematography: Patricio López
- Edited by: Roberto Bolado
- Music by: Rodrigo Dávila
- Production company: All About Media
- Distributed by: Videocine
- Release date: 7 October 2016 (Mexico)
- Running time: 98 minutes
- Country: Mexico
- Language: Spanish

Thirty, Single and Fantastic (Spanish: Treintona, soltera y fantástica) is a 2016 Mexican comedy film directed by Chava Cartas, and produced by Jose Alberto Lopez and Jose Manuel Flandes. The film premiered on 7 October 2016, and is bases on the 2013 book of the same name by Juana Inés Dehesa. It stars Bárbara Mori as the titular character. The film had a budget of 26 million pesos and was able to raise 136. In October 2018, it was confirmed that the film will have a sequel turned into a spin-off entitled Veinteañera: Divorciada y fantástica and starring Paulina Goto.

== Cast ==
- Bárbara Mori as Inés
- Juan Pablo Medina as Sensei
- Jordi Mollà as Óscar
- Natasha Dupeyrón as Regina
- Marimar Vega as Camila
- Angélica Aragón as Catalina
- Héctor Bonilla as Arturo
- Karla Carrillo as Cuñada Inés
- Andrés Zuno as Chavo Antro
- Claudio Lafarga as Emilio
- Claudette Maillé as Renata
- Andrés Almeida as Marco
- Roberto Quijano as Hernán
