= Claudio Roca =

Mexican actor

- Born: 26 April 1994 (age 30); Mexico City, Mexico
- Occupation: Actor
- Years active: 2011–present

Claudio Roca (born 26 April 1994 in Mexico City, Mexico) is a Mexican actor, best known in his native country for telenovelas as Cachito de cielo (2012), the second season Señora Acero (2015), La Doña (2016–2017), and Muy padres (2017). He studied acting and dramaturgy at the Televisa Centro de Educación Artística, and Stella Adler Studio of Acting in New York, United States.

== Filmography ==
=== Film roles ===
Year	Title	Roles	Notes
2011	Así es la suerte	Casting boy	
2015	Texas Rising: General Santa Anna: Leading Mexico	Ranger	Video short
2016	Los hermanos Salvador	Emilio Salvador	Short film
2018	Le vas a decir?	Chema	Short film; also writer and producer
2019	Díaz	Male	Short film
2019	Tú y yo y nuestros mejores amigos	Javier	Short film; also as executive producer
2020	Veinteañera: Divorciada y fantástica	Santi	
2020	DIA 33	Claudio Roca	Short film; also producer

=== Television roles ===
Year	Title	Roles	Notes
2012	Cachito de cielo	Poncho	Series regular; 60 episodes
2013	La rosa de Guadalupe	Marcos	Episode: "Háblame de amor"
2013–2016	Como dice el dicho	Anuar Iván Fernando	Episode: "El oro luce pero la virtud reluce" Episode: "Hasta no ver, no creer" Episode: "Soñaba el ciego que veía y soñaba lo que quería"
2013	Mentir para vivir	Bonifacio	Episodes: "Oriana visita al Juez" and "Marilú no cederá"
2014	De que te quiero, te quiero	Tomás	Recurring role; 8 episodes
2014	The Color of Passion	Mario	Recurring role; 3 episodes
2015	El Dandy	Diego Durand	Recurring role
2015	Señora Acero	Álvaro Martínez	Series regular (season 2); 33 episodes
2016	Hasta que te conocí	Young 1	Episode: "El precio de la libertad"
2016–present	La Doña	Adolfo Mendoza	Series regular (season 1); 120 episodes; series regular (season 2); 75 episodes
2017	Muy padres	Nicolás	Recurring role; 18 episodes
2018	Narcos: Mexico	Nicolás	Episodes: "El Padrino" and "Rafa, Rafa, Rafa!"
