= Leilah Assunção =

Brazilian dramatist, actress and writer

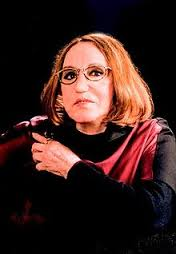
Assunção in 2016

Maria de Lourdes Torres de Assunção (born June 18, 1943), known professionally as Leilah Assunção or Leilah Assumpção, is a Brazilian dramatist, actress and writer.

== Biography ==
Assunção was born on June 18, 1943, in Botucatu, São Paulo, Brazil. She graduated from the University of São Paulo in 1964 with a degree in English and also completed extra courses in theater and literary criticism in Brazil and England. Although she is known as a playwright, she began her career working as an actress and a model, performing in Vereda de Salvacao by Jorge de Enrade in 1963 and The Three-penny opera by Bertolt Brecht in 1964. From there, she transitioned into writing stories for magazines and soap operas, eventually leading into her work as a playwright.

Assunção has been classed as among the two major women playwrights of Brazil, the other being Maria Adelaide Amaral. Her first play, Fala Baixo Senão Eu Grito (Speak Quietly or I'll Scream), won the Molière Award from the theatre critics of São Paulo when it was staged in 1969. She aimed to shock the audience by her choice of topic: depicting a middle-aged woman meeting an intruder. She was one of the leaders of New Theatre in the 1960s and several of her early plays were banned by censors.

== Works ==
Fala Baixo Senão Eu Grito along with her two preceding plays, Jorginho, o machão and Roda cor de Roda focus majorly on the stereotypes of the middle class and emphasize that conformity to these stereotypes is required. She openly depicts the majority of her characters as stuck in their current lifestyles, unable to break away from the status quo. One commodity of her first three works is that one or more of the characters eventually break free, but not in the traditional way one would think. They break free in regards to their imaginations/fantasies. For a short time period, they are able to fantasize and imagine themselves living in a world outside of the social norms. Overall, she wrights these plays to target the repressions society's moral standards place on people and the dissatisfaction of life that is likely to come with these repressions.

Fala Baixo Senão Eu Grito (1969) focuses on a middle-aged woman with a very boring, standard lifestyle. One night, an intruder breaks into her house with a gun and proceeds to insult her and destroy her apartment. He forces the woman to come with him on a fantasy adventure in which the woman breaks away from her dull life and creates an ideal one. She enjoys the experience up until she remembers she has responsibilities to attend to at a local department store. This results in her screaming for help, unable to ignore the obligations of her daily life.

Jorginho, o machão (1973) describes the dilemma of a young man who is pressured by his family to marry and join the family business. He rebels by fleeing to study at the University of São Paulo and then by continuing to fantasize there about what he wants his life to be like. This behavior does not help the conflict with his parents, resulting in attempted suicide.

Roda cor de Roda (1973) entails the story of a housewife rebelling against her husband after she has found out he has been cheating. The results in the fantasies of role reversals, where all three of them take turns being the breadwinner, the prostitute, and the homemaker. These role changes result in many opportunities and freedoms for the characters, but also the realizations of the limitations of each role.
