= Se llamaba Pedro Infante =

- Genre: Biographical
- Showrunner: Rubén Galindo
- Written by: Rubén Galindo; Guillermo Ríos; María José Mochales; Carolina Mata; Denis Languérand
- Directed by: Alejandro Bazzano; Sergio Siruela
- Starring: Ana Claudia Talancón; Mario Morán; Jorge Gallegos; Julio Bracho; Julieta Egurrola; Leticia Huijara; Vico Escorcia; Juan Carlos Remolina; Daniela Álvarez
- Composer: Osvaldo Montes
- Country of origin: Mexico
- Original language: Spanish
- No. of seasons: 1
- No. of episodes: 8

Production
- Executive producer: Rubén Galindo
- Producer: Alexa Muñoz Vidaña
- Editors: Marco Antonio Rocha; Milton Noé Galindo
- Camera setup: Multi-camera
- Production company: TelevisaUnivision

Original release
- Network: Vix
- Release: 1 December 2023

Se llamaba Pedro Infante is a Mexican biographical streaming television series produced by Rubén Galindo for TelevisaUnivision. The series is based on the life of Mexican actor and singer Pedro Infante. Mario Morán stars as Infante. The series is premiered on Vix on 1 December 2023.

== Cast ==
=== Main ===
- Ana Claudia Talancón as María Luisa León
- Mario Morán as Pedro Infante
  - Andrés Vázquez as young Pedro
  - Mateo Figueroa as child Pedro
- Julio Bracho as Antonio Matouk
- Julieta Egurrola as Rosario León
- Leticia Huijara as Doña Cuca
- Vico Escorcia as Lupita Torrentera
- Juan Carlos Remolina as Delfino
- Daniela Álvarez as Irma Dorantes

=== Recurring and guest stars ===
- Nacho Tahhan as Ismael
- Carlos Gatica as Jorge Negrete
- María del Carmen Félix as María Félix
- Manuel Balbi as Chuy
- Julio Casado as Commander Olivares
- Aroa Gimeno as Rebeca
- Juan Carlos Barreto as President Rodolfo Díaz
- Mariana Lodoza as Carmen Infante
- Norma Angélica as Begoña
- Maruza Cinta as Margarita
- Sara Montalvo as María Izaguirre
- Raúl Sandoval as Ángel Infante
  - Max Uribe as child Ángel
- Cristian Gamero as Márquez
- Luis Alberti as Antonio Badú
- Alberto Casanova as Alberto
- Rodrigo Magaña as Agustín Lara
- Fabián Pazzo as Vidal
- Leonardo Daniel as Emilio Azcárraga Vidaurreta
- Irving Aranda as Pepe Infante
  - Carlos Paul as child Pepe
- Alexa Anaya as Rosario Infante
  - Daniela García as young Rosario
- Hugo Aceves as Ramón
- Manuel Gorka as Presidente Manuel Almazán
- Teresa Rábago as Isaura
- Paola Flores as Piedad
- Paulina de Alba as Margarita Mora
- Christian Sampedro as José Benavides Jr.
- Walter Kapelas as Engineer Guzmán
- Iván Bronstein as Lawyer Del Castillo
- Caro Darma as Chavela
  - Renata Chacón as young Chavela
- Gregorio Reséndez as Priest
- Bella Azul Miganjos as Carmela
  - Paula Hernández as child Carmela
- Leonardo Flores as Domingo
- Victoria Pascual as Lupita Infante
- Ricardo Galina as Pedro Infante Jr.
- Carlos Larrañaga as Aurelio Robles
- Germán Alejandro as Manuel Almazán Jr.
- Vicente Peña as Enrique
- Lorena de la Torre as Rocío
- Eugenia Arreola as Itzel
- José Carlos Iyanes as Roberto Rodríguez
- Roberto Alanís as Emilio Azcárraga Jr.
- Héctor Holten as José
- Ximena Zairet as Dora Luisa
- Nicolás Dominc Ávila as Miguelito
- Jared Rivera as Dolores

== Production ==
In February 2018, Televisa announced that it was developing a biographical series of Pedro Infante, with Rubén Galindo as executive producer. Five years later, filming of the series began on 7 March 2023. A trailer of the series was released on 14 November 2023. The series premiered on 1 December 2023.

== Episodes ==
No.	Title	Original release date
1	"Una promesa a mi madre"	1 December 2023
2	"Una luz en mi vida"	1 December 2023
3	"Desilusión"	1 December 2023
4	"Un nuevo amor inevitable"	1 December 2023
5	"La muerte de mi hija"	1 December 2023
6	"Volar sobre alas de éxito"	1 December 2023
7	"Tocar el cielo aunque te quemes"	1 December 2023
8	"Un trágico adiós"	1 December 2023

== Awards and nominations ==
Year	Award	Category	Nominated	Result	Ref
2024	Produ Awards	Best Biographical Series	Se llamaba Pedro Infante	Nominated	
