= No Manches Frida =

2016 Mexican film

- Theatrical release poster
- Directed by: Nacho G. Velilla
- Written by: Laurence Rosenthal; Claudio Herrera; Sergio Adrian Sanchez
- Based on: Fack ju Göhte by Bora Dağtekin
- Produced by: Eddie Allen; Martha Higareda
- Starring: Omar Chaparro; Martha Higareda; Carla Adell; Mario Morán
- Cinematography: David Omedes
- Edited by: Angel Hernandez Zoido
- Music by: Juanjo Javierre
- Production companies: Televisa Cine; Pantelion Films; Alcon Entertainment; Constantin Film; Neverending Media; Videocine
- Distributed by: Videocine
- Release dates: 2 September 2016 (United States); 16 September 2016 (Mexico)
- Running time: 100 minutes
- Country: Mexico
- Language: Spanish
- Box office: $23.5 million

No Manches Frida (also known as El profesor sustituto) is a 2016 comedy film, a remake of the film Fack ju Göhte. The film stars Omar Chaparro and Martha Higareda in the lead roles. It was produced by Lionsgate and released in the United States on 2 September 2016, by Pantelion Films. The cinema chain AMC Theatres put the film into general distribution in the United States and Mexico in September 2016. A sequel, No Manches Frida 2, was released in March 2019.

== Cast ==
- Omar Chaparro as Ezequiel "Zequi" Alcántara
- Martha Higareda as Miss Lucy
- Mónica Dionne as Miss Gaby
- Rocio Garcia as Jenny
- Fernanda Castillo as Miss Carolina
- Regina Pavón as Mónica
- Carla Adell as Laura
- Mario Morán as Cristobal
- Karen Furlong as Nayeli
- Memo Dorantes as Romo
- Raquel Garza as Miss Ingrid
- Adal Ramones as Mr. Valdez
- Norma Angelica as Lic. Lopez
- Susana Ayala as Lucha
- Pamela Moreno as Cuquis
- Brigitte Bozzo as Marifer
- Miriam Calderon as Miss Gimena

== Box office ==
No Manches Frida grossed $11.5 million in the US and Canada, and $12 million in other territories (including $3.2 million in Mexico), for a worldwide total of $23.5 million.

It made $3.7 million on its opening weekend in the United States (and $4.8 million over the four-day Labour Day Weekend).

== Sequel ==
A sequel was announced by Pantelion Films in October 2016. The full title was revealed as No Manches Frida 2 and was released on 15 March 2019.

== See also ==
- List of highest-grossing Mexican films
