= Vanesa Restrepo =

Colombian actress and model

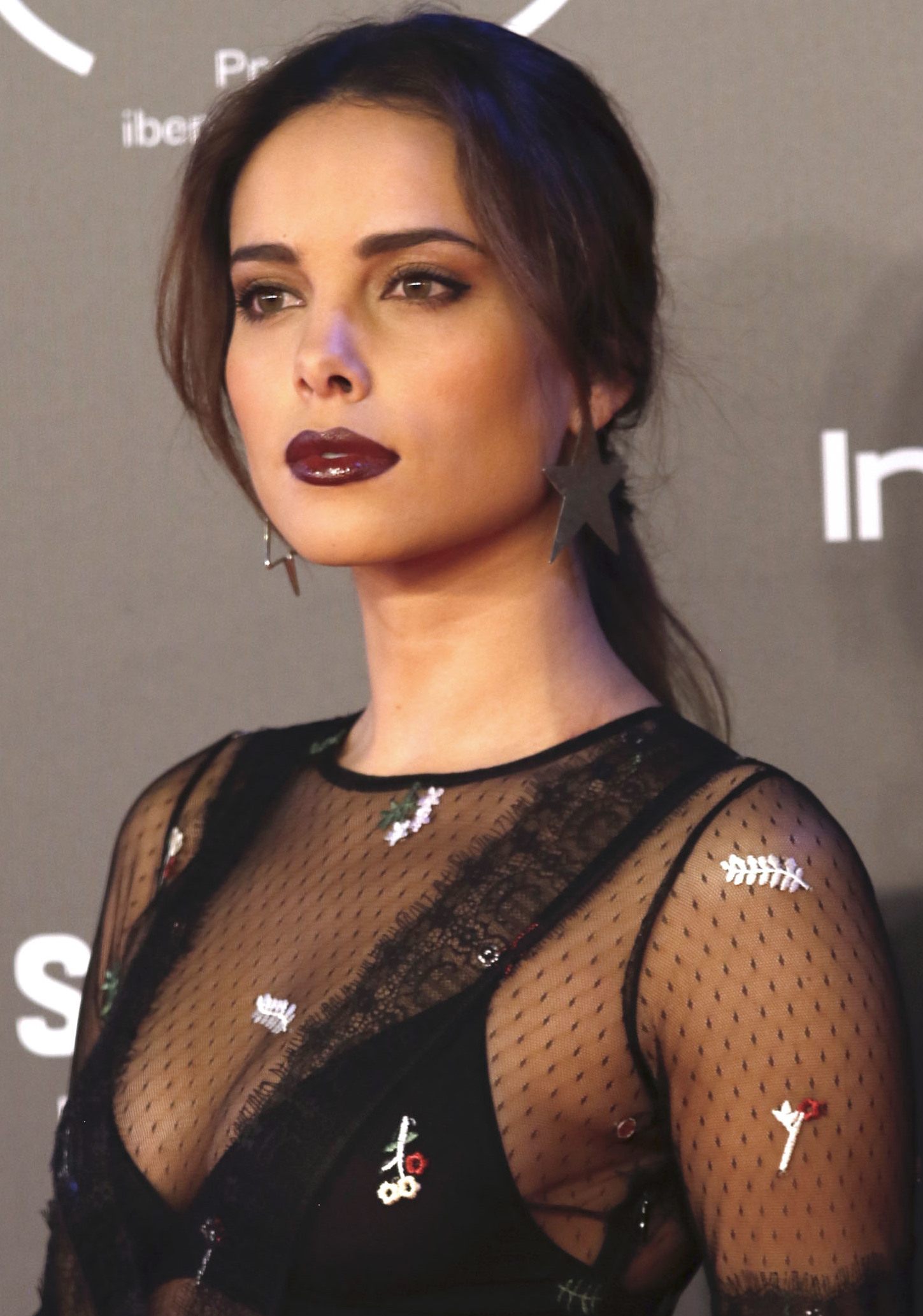
- Restrepo in 2017
- Born: 13 April 1987 (age 39); Medellín, Colombia
- Occupations: Actress, model
- Years active: 2011-present

Vanesa Restrepo (born April 13, 1987) is a Colombian actress and model. She is known for Como dice el dicho, Quiero amarte and Muchacha italiana viene a casarse.

== Filmography ==
=== Film roles ===
Year	Title	Roles	Notes
2017	El habitante	Camila	
2018	Consciencia	Vecina	

=== Television roles ===
Year	Title	Roles	Notes
2012–2013	Amores verdaderos	Ámbar	3 episodes
2012–2013	Como dice el dicho	Luzma Ana	Episode: "Despacio que voy deprisa" Episode: "Si por bueno te tienes..."
2013	La mujer del Vendaval	Unknown role	4 episodes
2013–2014	Quiero amarte	Nora	Recurring role; 44 episodes
2014–2015	Muchacha italiana viene a casarse	Alina	Recurring role; 46 episodes
2016	Corazón que miente	Denise	Series regular; 38 episodes
2016–2017	La Doña	Ximena Urdaneta	Series regular (season 1); 44 episodes
2017	Las 13 esposas de Wilson Fernández	Dientes de Leche	3 episodes
2017	El Vato	Erika	3 episodes
2018–2019	Falsa identidad	Paloma	Series regular (season 1); 65 episodes
2018	The Inmate	Elvira	7 episodes
2025	Amanecer	Fátima Peñalosa	Series regular
