= No manches Frida 2 =

No Manches Frida 2
- Theatrical release poster
- Directed by: Nacho G. Velilla
- Screenplay by: David S. Olivas; Claudio Herrera; Sergio Adrian Sanchez
- Based on: Fack ju Göhte by Bora Dağtekin
- Produced by: Edward Allen; Martha Higareda; Mauricio Arguelles; Nacho G. Velilla
- Starring: Omar Chaparro; Martha Higareda; Carla Adell; Mario Morán
- Cinematography: David Omedes
- Edited by: Angel Hernandez Zoido
- Music by: Juan Jose Javierre
- Production companies: Pantelion Films; Alcon Entertainment; Neverending Media; Lionsgate; Selva Pictures; Constantin Film
- Distributed by: Pantelion Films
- Release date: 15 March 2019
- Running time: 102 minutes
- Countries: Mexico; United States; Germany
- Language: Spanish
- Box office: $26.4 million

No Manches Frida 2: Paraíso Destruido is a 2019 comedy film directed by Nacho G. Velilla. A sequel to the 2016 film No Manches Frida, and loosely based on the German film Fack ju Göhte 2 (intentional misspelling of "Fuck you, Goethe"), it stars Omar Chaparro, Martha Higareda, Carla Adell and Mario Morán.

Despite a generally negative critical reception, the film performed well at the box office and is the third highest-grossing Mexican film with a gross of $325.4 million pesos (US$26 million). It was released in the United States on 15 March 2019, through Pantelion Films, and in Mexico on 12 April 2019.

== Premise ==
The film follows ex-con Zequi as he tries to win back the affections of his former girlfriend Lucy from her new boyfriend.

== Cast ==
- Omar Chaparro as Zequi
- Martha Higareda as Lucy
- Aaron Diaz as Mario
- Itati Cantoral as Camila
- Regina Pavón as Monica
- Memo Dorantes as Romo
- Mario Morán as Cristobal
- Karen Furlong as Nayeli
- Carla Adell as Laura
- Raquel de Icaza as Cuquis
- Fernanda Castillo as Carolina

== Production ==
No Manches Frida 2 was first announced in October 2016, following the box office success of the first film. Principal photography took place at a beach resort in Mexico in 2018.

== Release ==
The film was theatrically released in the United States and Canada on 15 March 2019. The first trailer was released in 8 October.

=== Box office ===
No Manches Frida 2 grossed $9.3 million in the United States and Canada, and $17.1 million in other territories, for a worldwide total of $26.4 million.

In the film's opening weekend in the United States, it made $3.9 million from 472 theaters, besting the first film's $3.7 million debut and finishing sixth. The film played best in the West and Southwest, standard for Hispanic-led features, with the West Coast accounting for 46% of business (versus 21% for a normal box office draw). It was the eighth-highest opening weekend ever for a foreign-language film in the US.

In Mexico, the film opened at #1 and grossed 87.2 million pesos on its opening weekend.

=== Critical response ===
On Rotten Tomatoes, the film holds an approval rating of 13% based on eight reviews, and an average rating of 3.8/10. Audiences polled by CinemaScore gave the film an average grade of "A" on an A+ to F scale.

== See also ==
- List of highest-grossing Mexican films
