= Muy padres =

Mexican telenovela

- Muy padres promotional poster
- Genre: Telenovela
- Based on: Señores Papis by Marcela Guerty and Pamela Rementería
- Screenplay by: Bethel Flores
- Directed by: Rodrigo Curiel; Luis Reyes; Agustín Restrepo
- Starring: Dulce María; Víctor González; Betty Monroe; Mario Morán; Héctor Suárez Gomís
- Opening theme: "Borrón y cuenta nueva" by Dulce María
- Country of origin: Mexico
- Original language: Spanish
- No. of seasons: 1
- No. of episodes: 98

Production
- Executive producers: Agustín Restrepo; Aurelio Valcárcel Carroll
- Producer: Rafael Gutiérrez
- Camera setup: Multi-camera

Original release
- Network: Imagen Televisión
- Release: September 18, 2017 – February 5, 2018

Related
- Señores Papis

Muy padres (stylized as ¡Muy padr3s!) is a Mexican telenovela produced by Agustín Restrepo and Aurelio Valcárcel Carroll for Imagen Televisión that premiered on September 18, 2017. This is the fourth original production of Imagen Televisión and bringing with it new talents. It is an adaptation of the Argentine story written by Marcela Guerty and Pamela Rementería titled Señores Papis. The telenovela revolves around three dads and the relationship problems between parents and children, as well as situations of single parents who care for their children, besides addressing topics such as alcoholism, child sexual abuse and children with Down syndrome.

Starring Dulce María, Víctor González, Mario Morán and Héctor Suárez Gomís in their debut on the television channel, along to Betty Monroe, Jessica Díaz and Mariel Chantal. It also has the star participation of Issabela Camil, Roberto Mateos and Sandra Destenave.

== Plot ==
This is the story of three dads: Emilio (Víctor González), Ricardo (Héctor Suárez Gomis) and Alan (Mario Morán). They meet in their children's kindergarten. Emilio is a businessman who likes to live surrounded by women, but his life takes a turn when Sofia (Fran Meric), a woman he had to see in the past, comes to his apartment and tells him that he has a son named Santiago (Checo Perezcuadra). Sofia flees, leaving her son in Emilio's care. After the incident, Emilio does not know what to do with the child. It's when he enrolls him in the Monarca kindergarten, where Pamela (Dulce María) works, an honest, passionate and free woman. Previously she and Emilio had already met when she ran over him while he ran behind Sofia in her escape; It is where you will initiate a great love that will change you both.

Alan is a single father, a rebellious and partying young man who takes care of his little son Arturo (Ari Placera), since his girlfriend died years ago. His in-laws, Rodolfo (Roberto Mateos) and Silvia (Sandra Destenave), disagree about him taking care of the boy, because they think it's bad influence for Arturo. Rodolfo and Silvia, will try to take away the homeland protested at any cost. But there comes Jenny (Jessica Díaz), a new neighbor and lawyer from Arturo who will help her get her son back. In the middle of the process, they fall madly in love.

Ricardo is a quiet father, but proud and resentful. After separating from his first wife, Margarita (Betty Monroe), with whom he has two daughters: Tania (Macarena García) and Regina (Valery Sais), he finds love again with Kika (Mariel Chantal), a younger woman who is about to give birth to his third daughter.

These three dads become friends through sharing and balancing life as workers, spouses, and parents.

== Cast ==
=== Main ===
- Dulce María as Pamela Díaz
- Víctor González as Emilio Palacios Fernández
- Betty Monroe as Margarita Rivapalacio
- Mario Morán as Alan de Garay Álvarez
- Héctor Suárez Gomís as Ricardo Pérez Valdez
- Jessica Díaz as Jennifer Salamanca
- Mariel Chantal as Érika López de Pérez
- Roberto Mateos as Rodolfo Villagrana
- Sandra Destenave as Silvia de Villagrana
- Fran Meric as Sofía Urrutia González
- Issabela Camil as Deborah
- Diego Soldano as Matías Montellano
- Adriana Leal as Perla
- Aranza Carreiro as Patricia Villagrana Juárez
- Macarena García as Tania Pérez Rivapalacio
- Julio Casado as Abelardo
- Alberto Reyes as Bicho
- Valery Sais as Regina Pérez Rivapalacio
- Checo Perezcuadra as Santiago Urrutia González
- Ari Placera as Arturo de Garay Villagrana

=== Recurring ===
- Claudio Roca as Nicolás
- María Prado as Carmelita
- Tamara Guzmán as Beatriz Esther Gómez Chávez
- Javier Ponce as Antonio
- Eva Prado as Elena Álvarez
- Mimi Morales as Gina Paola
- Alma Moreno as Rosita
- Carlos Hays as Diego
- Jonnathan Kuri as Leonardo Oliver
- Óscar Bonfiglio as Javier
- David Ostrosky as Alfredo Elizalde
- Eduardo Shacklett as Eduardo Fabbri
- Sergio Jurado as Bernardo Salamanca
- Alan Ciangherotti as Marco
- Andrea Carreiro as Ángela Villagrana Juárez
- Jorge Rodolfo Almada as César
- Juan Felipe Pulido as Jhon Freddy
- Paola Díaz Cardona as Maryssol Ferrer
- Israel Salmer as Erick
- Zully Keith as Nena Rivapalacio

=== Special participation ===
- Lupita Lara as Miriam
- Paco de la Fuente as Christian González
- Luz María Zetina as herself

== Production ==
In May 2017 Telefe announced that after the success of the Argentinean version of Señores Papis the novela would have a Mexican version produced and transmitted by Imagen Televisión. As the Argentinean version, Telefe also be in charge of distributing the Mexican version worldwide. The telenovela was formerly known as Papis muy padres.

Production of the series began on July 17, 2017, being the fourth original production of Imagen Televisión and the first to debut the channel recording studios.

=== Casting ===
On June 19, 2017, journalist Gil Barrera reported in the Mexican newspaper El Gráfico that Dulce María, Víctor González and Héctor Suárez Gomís would be the protagonists of the new series of Imagen Televisión. At the end of the month, Dulce María signed a contract with the channel confirming that she would be the protagonist of the new production.

On July 17, the recordings of the novel began, confirming Dulce María, Víctor González, Héctor Suárez Gomís, Mario Morán, Betty Monroe, Isabella Camil, Fran Meric, Roberto Mateos, Mariel Chantal, Jessica Díaz, Aranza Carreiro, Sandra Destenave, Diego Soldano and Alberto Reyes in the cast.

=== Music ===
The main theme of the telenovela "Borrón Y Cuenta Nueva" was composed by Dulce María, Pepe Portilla, Héctor Mena, Lito de la Isla and Oliver García and performed by Dulce María. The second song titled "Quédate" performed by Jessica Díaz was released as theme of Alan and Jenny.

== Reception ==
Upon release, Muy Padres received generally positive reviews by critics. The journalist Alex Piñón of the Mexican website Siete24 stated commented that the viewers will laugh from the first episode and it is not the typical comedy that the characters are embarrassed for being extremely exaggerated, that in this series, we will see "real" characters with whom we can identify ourselves. About the cast, he said that the acting maturity of the cast is notorious and the director managed to get the best of them, Betty Monroe and Dulce María are very well, as we see both in another facet and the children's cast are simply charming and steal the hearts of the audience.

In its debut month, Muy Padres entered the Social Wit List of the company The Wit (World Information Tracking), of all the new programs that were launched in Latin America during September and that generated more comments in the social networks. Muy Padres appeared in the fourth position with more than 12,000 comments.

The Chilean website Página 7 commented that "Muy Padres" had a final chapter praised, for the quality of performance and for its fun story. The site notes that the end was almost the same as the Chilean version and, like the Chilean version, they got good ratings. In addition, they had a good reception from the audience.

The journalist Lupita Martínez of the Mexican newspaper "El Gráfico" in her critique of the end of Muy Padres said that the series offered something different, that the dialogues full of tenderness between parents and children managed to move the viewer and attract him in common, credible but important situations that can happen in different families; the different ways of living a situation with children, without the radical melodrama, on the contrary, the stories were full of nuances. And she finished saying that nowadays it is important that the stories are told in this way and congratulated the production.

== Episodes ==
No.	Title	Original release date
1	"Comienza la historia de Muy Padres"	September 18, 2017
The story of three parents who are willing to leave everything for their children. Emilio, Ricardo and Alan meet in the kindergarten of your children, become true accomplices and together deal with the daily challenges of being successful professionals, spouses, men and above all, parents.
2	"Momento de grandes decisiones"	September 21, 2017 (Note: Episode 2 did not air on September 19, due to 2017 Central Mexico earthquake. Subsequently, on September 21, normal transmissions are resumed.)
Emilio prevents Sofia from escaping and leaves little Santi with him.
3	"Ricardo corre peligro"	September 22, 2017
Ricardo could lose the love of his life and his own life. Kika expels him from the house.
4	"Fuertes confesiones"	September 25, 2017
Ricardo spent the night at his ex's house, Emilio makes a decision he regrets and Alan reveals a dark secret.
5	"Nace el amor"	September 26, 2017
Emilio rescues Santi, who falls in love with Miss Pam. Alan is in danger of losing Arturito. Ricardo and Margarita kiss.
6	"Donde hubo fuego cenizas quedan"	September 27, 2017
Ricardo and Margarita kiss again. Alan is still fighting to get his son Arturo back. Emilio wins love from Miss Pam.
7	"Del odio al amor hay un paso"	September 28, 2017
Alan has more problems to recover Arturito, Emilio checks that from the hatred to the love there is a step and Ricardo can be burned of love.
8	"No hay vuelta atrás"	September 29, 2017
Comes the inevitable moment to face the mistakes and face the consequences, because there is no turning back.
9	"Entre la guerra y la paz"	October 2, 2017
Alan is between war and peace. Ricardo and Emilio between sin and forgiveness.
10	"Prueba de paternidad"	October 3, 2017
Emilio faces the paternity test, finds out if Santi is his son or not.
11	"Pedir perdón, perder la cabeza"	October 4, 2017
While Alan feels head, Emilio loses his and Ricardo doesn't have a cold head because of his jealousy.
12	"Fin al amor"	October 5, 2017
Emilio tells Miss Pam that they should date for Santi's sake. Matías discovers that Ricardo shot "Lupita".
13	"Perder la custodia"	October 6, 2017
Alan could lose custody of Arturito. Emilio has a business trip and looks for someone to babysit Santi. Ricardo finds a man in Margarita's house.
14	"Perder el amor"	October 9, 2017
Emilio could be close to losing Miss Pam's love. Alan's food business is closed.
15	"Cada vez más lejos"	October 10, 2017
Alan is increasingly away from recovering Arturito. Ricardo getting closer to his daughter and Emilio close to losing Pam.
16	"Un duro rival"	October 11, 2017
Emilio has a tough rival in Nicolás, to win and recover Miss Pam's heart he will have to do something extraordinary.
17	"Revivir sentimientos"	October 12, 2017
Ricardo and Margarita go to therapy with their daughter Tania. Emilio continues his rudeness to Margarita.
18	"La unión hace la fuerza"	October 13, 2017
Margarita, Kika and even Tania come together to care for Ricardo's youngest daughter, while he was having fun and drinking.
19	"Por fin juntos"	October 16, 2017
Emilio confesses his feelings to Pamela and decides to start a new story. Pato is very serious in the hospital.
20	"¡Somos novios!"	October 18, 2017
Emilio and Pam officially declare their relationship. Ricardo regrets separating himself from Margarita. Alan and Pato kiss.
21	"¿El mismo de siempre?"	October 19, 2017
Emilio writes a new love story with Pam, but he's still stuck in his past.
22	"Un paso atrás"	October 20, 2017
Emilio and Pam have a new relationship in their lives, but his past might complicate things.
23	"¡Un oscuro secreto!"	October 23, 2017
Pamela's secret is discovered by Nicolás. After a medical examination he proved that DNA compatibility is impossible.
24	"La verdad de Miss Pam"	October 24, 2017
Pamela confesses to Nico the reasons why she lied to Emilio, regarding the paternity of Santi.
25	"Jenny termina con Alan"	October 25, 2017
After finding with Pato, Jenny decides to end her relationship with Alan.
26	"En riesgo el amor"	October 26, 2017
Ricardo risks his dignity and his life, while Emilio is with the love of his life.
27	"Alan está furioso"	October 27, 2017
Alan might a confrontation with his ex-father-in-law because of Arturito.
28	"¡Te me vas de la casa!"	October 30, 2017
Ricardo might lose Kika because memories and feelings for his ex Margarita. Alan is very close to not winning custody of Arturito.
29	"Emilio se queda desempleado"	October 31, 2017
After canceling his trip with Deborah, Emilio is fired from his job and it's hard to find a new job.
30	"Malos tiempos para Emilio"	November 1, 2017
Emilio was fired and it is difficult to find work. Alan threatens Rodolfo. Ricardo asks Margarita for a divorce.
31	"Pam defiende a Emilio"	November 2, 2017
Pamela talks to Deborah to try to help Emilio. Ricardo is rejected by Kika.
32	"Ricardo quiere recuperar a Kika"	November 3, 2017
Ricardo seeks reconciliation with Kika but she just wants to have fun. Emilio begins to have serious problems.
33	"Sacrificio de amor"	November 6, 2017
Pamela wants to renounce Emilio's love in order to help him return to Deborah and get out of the ruin.
34	"Pam y Emilio terminan"	November 7, 2017
Emilio blamed Pamela for his ruin and decided to end the relationship. Ricardo and Margarita kiss again and she doesn't want to sign the divorce agreement.
35	"Ricardo tiene que elegir"	November 8, 2017
After what happened between them, Margarita and Ricardo live a difficult decision. Emilio becomes arrogant.
36	"Todo por amor a Santi"	November 9, 2017
Santi steals at school to help his dad Emilio out of poverty.
37	"Alan podría regresar con Jenny"	November 10, 2017
Alan could return with Jenny. Emilio sees an old friend. Ricardo will marry Kika.
38	"Alan pierde la custodia de Arturo"	November 13, 2017
The judge determined that Arturito live with his grandparents. Pam found Perla in Emilio's apartment.
39	"Ricardo mete la pata"	November 14, 2017
Ricardo confessed to Matías what happened between him and Margarita. Alan can take a risky exit with Arturo.
40	"Te voy a encontrar Alan"	November 15, 2017
Rodolfo is angry because he does not find Alan and will not rest until he finds him. Emilio realizes that Santi is sick while Alan begins a new life with Arturo.
41	"Kika descubre a Ricardo"	November 16, 2017
Ricardo is discovered by Kika about his secret. Emilio and Perla almost kiss. Alan already has fake papers to escape the country.
42	"¿Pam está celosa de Perla?"	November 17, 2017
Margaret is pregnant. Pamela and Perla argue over Santi. Ricardo befriends Matías.
43	"¿De quién es el bebé?"	November 20, 2017
Margarita is pregnant and she doesn't know if the child is from Ricardo or Matías. Rodolfo finds Alan. Perla and Emilio kiss.
44	"La prueba de embarazo"	November 21, 2017
Ricardo finds Margarita's pregnancy test but thinks it's Tania's.
45	"¡Serás papá!"	November 22, 2017
Ricardo might become a dad for the fourth time. Alan receives a terrible diagnosis.
46	"La mentira de Tania"	November 23, 2017
To hide Margarita's secret, Tania tells Ricardo that she's the one who is pregnant.
47	"Jenny y Alan terminan"	November 24, 2017
Jenny ends her relationship with Alan. Ricardo talks to Margarita about Tania's "pregnancy".
48	"Un nuevo amor"	November 27, 2017
Emilio thinks about marrying Perla. Ricardo finds out that Tania is not pregnant. Alan and Pato kiss.
49	"Pamela pierde a Emilio"	November 28, 2017
Perla is getting closer and closer to Emilio, which means Pam loses the love of her life. Ricardo learns that Margarita will be mother.
50	"Pam se despide"	November 29, 2017
Pamela says goodbye to Emilio, she thinks about going to live in Chiapas with Nico. Alan falls into addiction. Matías and Ricardo dispute the paternity of the baby of Margarita.
51	"Emilio cae en tentación con Pam"	November 30, 2017
Pamela and Emilio kiss again despite the fact that she is going to go to Chiapas. Matías accompanies Margarita to the ultrasound.
52	"Un corazón roto"	December 1, 2017
Pamela had an affair with Emilio which could break Nico's heart. Ricardo might be discovered because of his infidelity.
53	"¿Será demasiado tarde?"	December 4, 2017
Emilio will make the request to Pam not to leave the city. Margarita could be in danger. Ricardo's infidelity will be revealed and Emilio's confession could be too late.
54	"¡El bebé de Margarita en peligro!"	December 5, 2017
Margarita's health is in danger and puts her baby at risk. Perla demands Emilio sincerity in their relationship.
55	"Una dura oponente"	December 6, 2017
Perla has a relationship with Emilio but knows that Pam is a tough rival. Ricardo is about to discover his daughter Tania, already masters the rules of the game.
56	"Margarita pierde a su bebé"	December 7, 2017
Margarita has a strong pain that unfortunately made her lose her baby.
57	"Emilio reconquistará a Pamela"	December 8, 2017
Perla tells Emilio to go after Pamela, Emilio decides to go to look for Pamela to ask her to return but the past will prevent them.
58	"Jenny se sorprende con una gran noticia"	December 11, 2017
Jenny recibe una gran noticia después de realizarse una prueba. Margarita doesn't want to know about Matías or Ricardo.
59	"El regreso de Sofía"	December 12, 2017
The happiness of Emilio and Pamela could be short lived since his past returns.
60	"¡No es el papá!"	December 13, 2017
Emilio learns the truth about Santi and Pamela feels bad about revealing the secret.
61	"¡La verdad sale a la luz!"	December 14, 2017
Pamela reveals to Emilio the truth about the DNA test.
62	"Emilio pierde a Santi"	December 15, 2017
After learning that Santi is not his son, Emilio is afraid of losing him forever.
63	"¿Juntos de nuevo?"	December 18, 2017
Margarita and Ricardo spend time together and can not help but kiss and remember moments when they were together.
64	"El amor ronda muy de cerca"	December 19, 2017
Margarita and Ricardo are starting to date and Santi tries to escape from Sofia.
65	"Inesperada traición"	December 20, 2017
Emilio is ridiculed in court and could lose Santi forever because of Marco's testimony.
66	"Amarga venganza"	December 21, 2017
Ricardo was very surprised to learn that Kika is the new manager of Matías's project. Arturo asks Alan to be Pato's boyfriend.
67	"Preparados para lo peor"	December 22, 2017
Jenny's heart will break in a thousand pieces when she sees Alan has already started a relationship with Pato. Emilio has decided to fight for Santi no matter what he has to do.
68	"Un caos se avecina"	December 25, 2017
Ricardo decides to renounce Matías's project to be with who he really loves. Emilio is giving up and accepted that Santi is not his son and Arturo asks his grandfather Rodolfo to let his father live in the house.
69	"Una tierna sorpresa"	December 26, 2017
Jenny can no longer hide the truth, she will tell Alan she is pregnant and Alan will have to make a difficult decision, choose between Arturo or Pato.
70	"Alto al amor"	December 27, 2017
Emilio returns to his life of luxury and conquest, for his bad luck Pamela sees it, which can mean the end of a their love. Rodolfo decides to accept the relationship between Pato and Alan and Jenny will face new challenges with her pregnancy, Margarita can not continue with Ricardo.
71	"¡Alan ya lo sabe!"	December 28, 2017
Pamela has a secret from her childhood and her past, Emilio faces his present and Alan discovered that Jenny is pregnant and looks for a new future.
72	"¿Regresa Ricardo?"	December 29, 2017
Margarita tells Ricardo that they can not return. Emilio is again the same as before. Pato finds out about Jenny's pregnancy.
73	"Emociones encontradas"	January 1, 2018
Jenny will have a baby with down syndrome and breaks the news to Alan. Ricardo returns with his family.
74	"El encuentro"	January 2, 2018
Emilio returns to see Santi but treats him indifferently. Jenny talks to Alan about the future of her baby. Pamela finds an old childhood friend, Alan receives support from Emilio and Ricardo after learning that he will have a child with down syndrome.
75	"Emilio regresa por Santi"	January 3, 2018
Emilio returns for Santi and for Sofia. Pato is jealous of what might happen between Alan and Jenny.
76	"¡Soy tu padre!"	January 4, 2018
Emilio's love for Santi is reborn, Sofía tells Emilio who is the father of Santi and Alan's love for Pato can die.
77	"En el corazón no se manda"	January 5, 2018
Alan speaks truthfully to Pato and tells her that he'd still in love with Jenny. Emilio kisses Sofia.
78	"¡Me llevo a Santi!"	January 8, 2018
Sofia wants to take Santi out of Mexico. Alan has one last chance not to lose his son and Ricardo suspect Kika is going out with Matías.
79	"Reencuentro inesperado"	January 9, 2018
Pamela helps a friend, Sofia confesses to Emilio that she is in love with him, Jenny receives an unexpected visitor and Ricardo discovers Kika kissing Matías.
80	"¿Un nuevo romance?"	January 10, 2018
Ricardo notes that Matías does not see him alone as a rival of loves. Emilio makes a tough decision regarding Sofia. Rodolfo hits Silvia.
81	"Fuertes revelaciones"	January 11, 2018
Emilio asks Sofia for an opportunity, Ricardo confesses to Kika that Matías is in love with him, Jenny's father asks her to live with him in Amsterdam. Patricia asks Rodolfo the truth about how Angela really died and Pamela asks the journalist for help finding Erick in exchange for assisting in testimony against the orphanage.
82	"Arrepentimiento"	January 12, 2018
Margarita confesses to Ricardo to be sorry to return with him. Emilio decides to adopt Santi.
83	"El cumpleaños de Margarita"	January 15, 2018
Ricardo, Tania and Regina give Margarita a big surprise for her birthday. Pamela finds out about the courtship between Emilio and Sofia.
84	"¿Dónde está Pato?"	January 16, 2018
Alan receives the news that Pato supposedly moved to Barcelona, when she was kidnapped and could discover what his father-in-law was able to do to get him away from Pato. Ricardo is jealous of Kika's new relationship that he's about to make a serious mistake and plans to do something with Matías.
85	"Indecisiones y amor"	January 17, 2018
Ricardo is still confused as to how he feels about Kika. Jenny makes a big decision and the return of Santiago to the kindergarten of Miss Pamela means a new opportunity to recover Emilio.
86	"El amor se destruye en un segundo"	January 18, 2018
Santi returns to kindergarten and Sofía tries to leave Emilio away from Pam. Alan buys a new food truck and love with Jenny is reborn, Ricardo decides who he loves the most, Margarita or Kika.
87	"Una decisión de dos"	January 19, 2018
Pamela's interview denouncing the abuse she suffered at the orphanage will air on TV, Ricardo and Margarita have a painful decision. Emilio can not go back to Pamela or lose Santi forever.
88	"Adiós príncipe azul"	January 22, 2018
Sofia decides to finish everything with Emilio and Pamela is attacked by the parents of the school. Kika asks Margarita to give Ricardo another chance, because he loves her.
89	"Nos vamos a casar"	January 23, 2018
Ricardo asks Margarita in marriage. Margarita tells Pamela give another chance to Emilio. Ricardo asks for the engagement ring he gave to Kika to give Margarita and Emilio asks Jenny for advice on how to have rights over Santi.
90	"Un sacrificio de amor"	January 24, 2018
Emilio will ask Sofia in marriage so he does not stay away from his son Santi, Margarita's mother arrives and disturbs Ricardo.
91	"No te puedo esperar"	January 25, 2018
Emilio asks Pamela to wait two years while he gets Santi's guard so they can return the relationship, but she does not accept it. Margarita's mother will help Matías to recover his daughter.
92	"Magia negra"	January 26, 2018
Ricardo turns to Gina Paola to help him get his mother-in-law out of the house through black magic. Pamela can not adopt because of her past and Marco forces Sofia do a job for him.
93	"El gran secreto de Sofía"	January 29, 2018
Alan discovers Eduardo's true personality, Margarita and Nena go after Ricardo at Gina Paola's house. Sofia confesses to Emilio that she killed Santi's father. Emilio tells Pamela that he could have Santi's guard but Sofia could be arrested.
94	"Un nuevo rival de amores para Ricardo"	January 30, 2018
Patricia leaves the clinic where she was interned, Alan and Patricia go after information about Angela's death, a widowed father arrives at the kindergarten and conquer Margarita and Emilio asks again that Pamela wait for him and Santi but she does not accept.
95	"Llega una nueva tormenta"	January 31, 2018
With the help of Pamela, Alan escapes with Arturo of the danger that Rodolfo represents. Emilio's mother is very serious. Ricardo is jealous and his relationship with Margarita suffers.
96	"El crimen de Rodolfo"	February 1, 2018
Alan and Pato learn of a secret kept by Rodolfo. Emilio's mother dies. Ricardo arrives drunk at home and Margarita ends their relationship. Rodolfo follows Patricia and Emilio goes after Pamela, he does not want to lose her.
97	"La verdad sale a la luz"	February 2, 2018
Rodolfo takes Arturo, Pamela and Emilio stay together and Sofia discovers and asks Marco for help to escape with Santi, Ricardo leaves Margarita's house. Alan and Jenny face the doctor who did Angela's autopsy, he tells Rodolfo and Silvia listens.
98	"Gran final de Muy Padres"	February 5, 2018
Sofia gives up running away with Santi, she leaves the suitcase with drugs in front of the police with a ticket claiming to be from Marco, Alan arrives at Rodolfo's house in search of Arturo. Alan and Ricardo face Rodolfo who is armed and confesses he was responsible for the death of Angela, during the discussion Ricardo takes a shot and Rodolfo kills himself. Sofia leaves a video for Emilio and Santi speaking that she will travel but will continue to communicate with Santi. Four months later, Emilio and Santi will move to a larger house along with Pamela, who will continue to try to adopt a child. Santi receives a message from Sofia that says she will visit him soon and he asks permission to call Pamela from Mom, Santi calls Pamela from Mom and they both get excited. Ricardo is going to marry Margarita but together with Emilio and Alan they will present the vegetable show and soon after they get into a mess with the police, they arrive late for the wedding and during the ceremony the police arrive and arrest the three. Margarita and all the guests enjoy the party despite not having had a wedding.

== Webisodes ==
=== ¡Cocina junto a Alan! (2017) ===
It was published on YouTube 12 episodes with the character Alan, teaching recipes in his food truck, "Alebrije".

No.	Title	Original release date	Length (minutes)
1	"Aguacates rellenos"	December 14, 2017	01:02
2	"Calabacitas con pollo"	December 14, 2017	01:01
3	"Chayotes rellenos"	December 14, 2017	01:01
4	"Doraditas de nopal"	December 14, 2017	00:58
5	"Papitas botaneras"	December 14, 2017	01:01
6	"Ensalada Kentucky"	December 14, 2017	01:01
7	"Ensalada hawaiiana"	December 14, 2017	01:04
8	"Ensalada mexicana"	December 14, 2017	01:02
9	"Salchilocas"	December 14, 2017	01:09
10	"Tacos de jícama"	December 14, 2017	01:05
11	"Tostadas del puerto"	December 14, 2017	01:01
12	"Couscous de coliflor"	December 14, 2017	01:01

== Awards and nominations ==
Year	Award	Category	Nominated	Result	Ref(s)
2017	TV Adicto Golden Awards	Best Telenovela of Imagen Televisión	Muy padres	Won	
2018	Kids Choice Awards Mexico	Favorite actress	Dulce María	Nominated	
2018	Kids Choice Awards Mexico	Favorite show	Muy padres	Nominated	
2018	PRODU Awards	Actress - Best Digital Strategy	Dulce María	Nominated	
