= Veinteañera, divorciada y fantástica =

2020 Mexican comedy romantic film

- Directed by: Noé Santillán-López
- Written by: Angélica Gudiño
- Produced by: José Alberto López
- Starring: Paulina Goto; Vadhir Derbez
- Cinematography: Mario Gallegos
- Edited by: Verónica López
- Music by: Dan Zlotnik
- Production company: All About Media
- Distributed by: Videocine
- Release date: 13 March 2020 (Mexico)
- Running time: 96 minutes
- Country: Mexico
- Language: Spanish

Veinteañera, divorciada y fantástica is a 2020 Mexican comedy film directed by Noé Santillán-López. The film is produced by All About Media, and stars Paulina Goto, and Vadhir Derbez. It's a spin-off of the 2016 film titled Treintona, soltera y fantástica. The film premiered on 13 March 2020, and during the COVID-19 pandemic it remained in the first place of the national box office, breaking a record for a Mexican film and according to Imcine's 2020 Statistical Yearbook, it was the most streamed Mexican film of the year.

== Cast ==
- Paulina Goto as Regina
- Vadhir Derbez as Juanpa
- Jesús Zavala as Andrés
- Natalia Téllez as Tábata
- Ela Velden as Lorenza
- Giselle Kuri as Roberta
- Juan Carlos Barreto as Manuel
- Claudio Roca as Santi
- Paco Rueda as Turrón
- Eduardo Arroyuelo Nicolás
- Ricardo Peralta "Torpecillo" as Toñito
- Ana González Bello as Emiliana
- Carlos "Capi" Pérez as Cholo
- Manelyk González as herself
