= Michelle Olvera =

Mexican actress

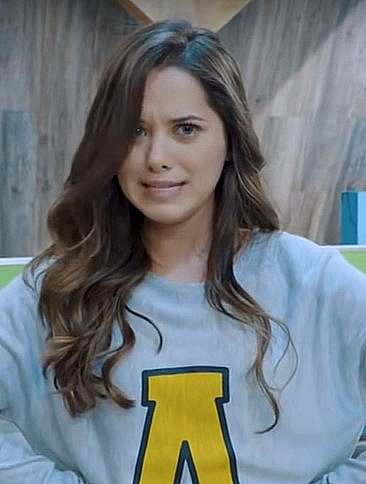
- Olvera in 2018
- Born: Monterrey, Mexico
- Occupation: Actress
- Years active: 2014–present

Michelle Olvera is a Mexican actress best known for her role as Isabela Sandoval in the adaptation of the Rómulo Gallegos' novel Doña Bárbara titled La Doña, and her role as Silvia Rojas in the Nickelodeon Latin America series Noobees.

== Filmography ==
=== Film roles ===
Year	Title	Roles	Notes
2014	Huérfanos	Petra	

=== Television roles ===
Year	Title	Roles	Notes
2015–2016	El Señor de los Cielos	Haydeé	Recurring role (seasons 3–4); 28 episodes
2016	Un día cualquiera	Sonia	Episode: "Cirugías plásticas"
2016–2017	La Doña	Isabela Sandoval	Series regular (season 1); 97 episodes
2018–2020	Noobees	Silvia Rojas	Main role (seasons 1–2); 120 episodes
2018	No Fear of Truth: You Are no Longer Alone	Aranza	Episode: "Mirreyes impunes"
2018	40 y 20	Fran's friend	Episode: "Peinando a la muñeca"
2019	This Is Silvia Pinal	Young María Luisa "Merilú" Hidalgo	Episode: "Esta es mi historia"
2026	Los encantos del sinvergüenza	Macarena	Recurring role
