= Noobees =

Colombian television series

- Genre: Teen drama
- Directed by: William Barragán
- Country of origin: Colombia
- Original language: Spanish
- No. of seasons: 2
- No. of episodes: 120

Production
- Camera setup: Single-camera
- Production companies: Viacom International Studios; MediaPro Studios

Original release
- Network: Nickelodeon Latin America
- Release: 17 September 2018 – 31 July 2020

Noobees is a Colombian esports teen drama television series filmed entirely in Bogota, Colombia and produced by Viacom International Studios, and MediaPro Studios. The series premiered on Nickelodeon in some countries. on 17 September 2018, followed by its debut in Colombia on RCN Televisión on 6 October. The series had been renewed for a second season, released in March 2020. The series stars Michelle Olvera.

== Synopsis ==
NooBees revolves around the trajectory of a group of teenagers who have the opportunity to fulfill their biggest dream: participate in the Esports Championship. For this they create "NooBees", an esports team that will compete for the title of Professional Video Games League.

== Series overview ==
Series	Episodes		Originally released	
Series	Episodes		First released	Last released
1	60		17 September 2018	7 December 2018
2	60	30	2 March 2020	10 April 2020
2	60	30	22 June 2020	31 July 2020

== Cast ==
=== Introduced in season 1 ===
- Michelle Olvera as Silvia Rojas (seasons 1-2)
- Andrés de la Mora as David Ortuz (seasons 1-2)
- María Jose Vargas as Ruth Olivera "Ruthilika" (seasons 1-2)
- Lion Bagnis as Matt Montero "Míster M"
- Ilenia Antonini as Tania Botero
- Kevin Bury as Pablo Botero
- Brandon Figueredo as Erick Rojas (seasons 1-2)
- Clara Tiezzi as Laura Calles (seasons 1-2)
- Karol Saavedra as Roberta Barrios (season 1; guest season 2)
- Megumi Hasebe as Liliana "Lili" (seasons 1-2)
- Andy Munera as Nicholas "Niko" (seasons 1-2)
- Felipe Arcila as Kevin Orlando Núñez Gómez "Kong" (seasons 1-2)
- Camila Pabón as Norah (seasons 1-2)
- Luis Fernando Salas as Héctor Rojas (seasons 1-2)
- Óscar Rodo as Roberto Barrios (season 1; guest season 2)
- Nara Gutiérrez as Marina Gómez (seasons 1-2)
- Karen Martínez as Salma de Rojas (seasons 1-2)
- Lugo Duarte as Mateo Montero (seasons 1-2)
- Marisol Correa as Emma de Montero
- Julian Beltran as Game Over (Voice) (seasons 1-2)
- Daniela Velez as Helen Santiago (season 1; guest season 2)
- Sergio Herrera as Rufino (seasons 1-2)
- Fernando Lara as Rector
- Juliana Velásquez as Soledade (season 1; guest season 2)
- Gonzalo Vivanco as Zigorisko

=== Introduced in season 2 ===
- Julián Cerati as Rocco
- Karlis Romero as Athina
- Luis Giraldo as Melvin
- Mafe Marín as Jackie
- Alejandro Hidalgo as Trueno
- Ginna Parra as Fernanda "Estrella"
- Monica Uribe as Doris Tormenta
- Pablo Rodríguez as Arturo
- Isabella Dominguez as Nina
- Daniela Perez "La Pereztroica" as Olimpia
- Juanita Molina as Kosnika
- Carlos Baéz as Kral
- Michelle Orozco as Oritzó
- Estive Urrutia as Anoiram
- Stiven Espitia as Adoam
- Nicolas Vargas as Sasac
- Jeisen Pacheco as Ferbat
- Camila Mora as Duna
- Daniel Moreno as Kevelek
- Alejandro Gutierrez as Enzo
- Nataly Arbelaez as Betsy
- Laila Camacho as Zilua
- Freddy Beltrán as Jurado
- Ian Valencia as Game Over (Avatar Form)
