= Martha Higareda =

Mexican actress, writer, producer (b. 1983)

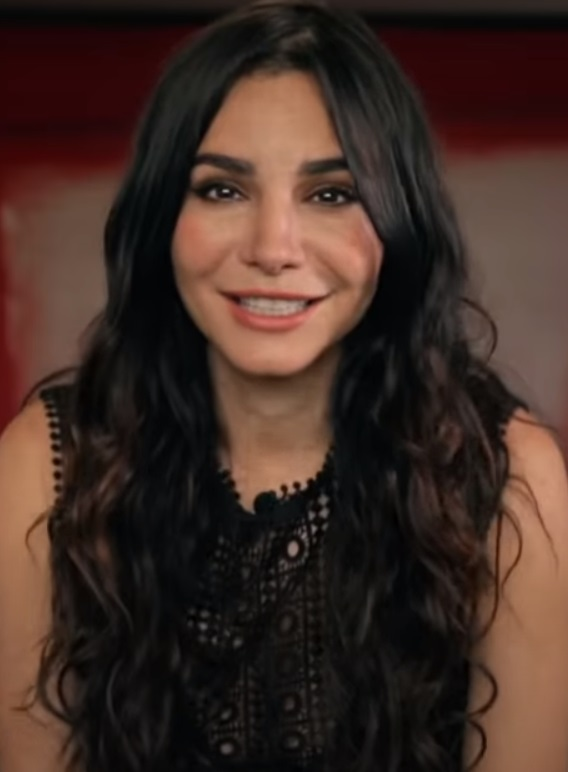
- Higareda in 2019
- Born: Martha Elba Guadalupe Higareda Cervantes; August 24, 1983 (age 43); Villahermosa, Tabasco, Mexico
- Occupations: Actress, producer, screenwriter
- Years active: 2002–present
- Spouse: Cory Brusseau (m. 2016; div. 2020) Lewis Howes (m. 2025)
- Children: 2
- Relatives: Miriam Higareda (sister)

Martha Elba Guadalupe Higareda Cervantes (Spanish pronunciation: [ˈmaɾtajɣaˈɾeða]) (born August 24, 1983) is a Mexican actress, producer and screenwriter.

== Life and career ==
Higareda was born in Villahermosa, Tabasco, Mexico, the daughter of actress Martha Cervantes and artist and therapist Jose Luis Higareda, and sister of actress Miriam Higareda. She began acting on the stage at a very early age, along with dancing jazz, flamenco, tap and folklore. At 14, she moved to Mexico City from her native Tabasco to pursue an acting career.

Being an advanced student, she entered college several years early at the age of 15, studying communications at El Tecnologico de Monterrey. She would attend college in the mornings while going to acting school in the evenings and performing in theater on the weekends. A year later her mother and sister moved to Mexico City and attended acting school with her.

Alfonso Cuaron came to Mexico City auditioning for Y Tu Mamá También, Higareda won the part of Cecilia Huerta, Gael Garcia Bernal's girlfriend in the film, but being underage and due to the full nudity in the movie she was not able to perform the role. Cuaron encouraged her to keep pursuing her acting career. Soon after, she changed her major from communications to performing arts.

Higareda made her major film debut in the 2002 production Amar te duele. The movie quickly became a box office hit and launched Higareda's career, giving her the nickname "The Mexican Sweetheart".

In 2003, she was offered the lead in the Mexican TV show Enamórate on TV Azteca, next to Yahir, where she also shared credits with María Inés Guerra, Martha Cristiana, Fernando Sarfati, and Amara Villafuerte. But Higareda's passion was in making movies. Higareda returned with the movie Siete Días next to Jaime Camil, in which she played a girl whose dream is to make U2 come to the city of Monterrey in less than a week.

She worked with Carlos Carrera (El crimen del Padre Amaro) in Sexo, amor y otras perversiones winning another Silver Goddess Award. That same year, she was nominated as best supporting actress for the Mexican Academy Awards for her role in Fuera del Cielo, In 2007, she came with her latest production Niñas Mal, directed by Fernando Sariñana where she shared credits with Camila Sodi and Ximena Sariñana.

She booked her first American movie with the 2007 production Borderland, where she shared credits with Brian Presley and Beto Cuevas. The movie was screening in the U.S. film market when an agent introduced Higareda to Craig Shapiro, who to this day represents Higareda at ICM Partners. Shapiro convinced Higareda to move to LA.

She went back to her country with three finished scripts and at the age of 25 she wrote and produced her first independent film, Te presento a Laura. The movie was in the top ten films in box-office for 10 consecutive weeks. She shot the prequel to the crime/action film Smokin' Aces, Smokin' Aces 2: Assassins' Ball, as a deadly female assassin with poisonous lips. In 2012, she appeared in Hello Herman with Norman Reedus as an American reporter.

In Lies in Plain Sight she played the lead role, as a visually impaired woman trying to solve the murder of her sister.

In 2014, she also wrote, produced and starred in "Casese Quien Pueda" (Marry whoever you can), directed by Marco Polo Constandse and produced by Martha and Miri Higareda and Alejandra Cardenas. The movie quickly became the second biggest box office record of its time. This caught the attention of U.S. studios. "I wanted not only to be in movies, but to know the guts of the industry. Making movies it's all a team effort, so if you surround yourself with the best people you learn from them and then if you can also give an opportunity to those whom you believe in their talent, magical things happen".

She won the Mayahuel Award at the Guadalajara International Film Festival for the movie Mariachi Gringo, and that same year she played Amparo in the miniseries Carlos. She worked in the Disney movie McFarland, USA with director Nikki Caro.

In 2016, she produced and starred in No manches Frida, with Edward Allen and Mauricio Arguelles. From Pantelion, Lionsgate, Videocine and Constantin Film, No Manches Frida was another box office hit, where Higareda plays the shy, yet passionate Miss Lucy, who falls in love with a criminal (Omar Chaparro). Higareda pitched Chaparro for the role. Made for $2.5 million, the film made $23 million at the box office.

Higareda produced with Miguel Mier, Jimena Rodriguez, and Bernardo Rugama the box office success and Mexican adaptation of 3 idiots, a story about following one's true passion.

In 2018, Higareda starred in Netflix's Altered Carbon, a hard-boiled tech noir television series based on the book by Richard K. Morgan, as detective Kristin Ortega.

In 2019, she played the lead role of Marisol in Hulu's American horror anthology television series, Into the Dark, episode "Culture Shock".

== Personal life ==
From 2016 to 2020, Higareda was married to American actor Cory Brusseau.

In June 2021, Higareda began dating American podcaster and former football player Lewis Howes. The couple got engaged in September 2023 during a live podcast recording in Ohio. In 2024, she underwent laparoscopic surgery to remove uterine fibroids.

In February 2025, Higareda and Howes married in Playa del Carmen. The couple welcomed twin girls in November 2025.

== Filmography ==
=== Film roles ===
Year	Title	Roles	Notes
2002	Amar te duele	Renata	
2003	Casa de los Babys	Celia	
2003	Mujer dormida	Marina	Short film
2003	El sueño de Elías	María, At Age 18	
2004	Al otro lado	Eréndira	
2005	Volver, volver	Mónica	Short film
2005	7 días	Gloria	
2006	Sexo, amor y otras perversiones	María	Segment: "María in the Elevator"
2006	Fuera del cielo	Elisa	
2006	Así del precipicio	Cristina	
2007	Niñas mal	Adela León	
2007	Borderland	Valeria	
2007	La leyenda de la Nahuala	Xochitl	Voice role
2007	Hasta el viento tiene miedo	Claudia	
2008	All Inclusive	Camila	
2008	Street Kings	Grace García	
2010	Smokin' Aces 2: Assassins' Ball	Ariella Martinez	
2010	Sin memoria	Mónica	
2010	Te presento a Laura	Laura	Also as writer and producer
2011	Malaventura	Mitzy	
2012	Mariachi Gringo	Lilia	
2012	Hello Herman	Isa Cruz	
2013	Go for Sisters	Zeidy	
2014	Cásese quien pueda	Ana	Also as writer and producer
2015	McFarland	Lupe	
2015	Una última y nos vamos	Flor	Also as producer
2016	No manches Frida	Lucy	Also as producer
2016	Vive por mí	Ana	
2017	3 idiotas	Mariana	Also as writer and producer
2018	Deadtectives	Abril	
2019	No manches Frida 2	Lucy	Also as producer
2019	Tod@s caen	Mia	Also as writer and producer
2023	Fuga de Reinas	Paty	Also as writer and producer

=== Television roles ===
Year	Title	Roles	Notes
2003	Enamórate	Celeste	Main role; 125 episodes
2004	Gitanas	Young Jovanka Sanchez	
2004–2005	Las Juanas	Juana Carolina	
2008	Tiempo final	Flor	Episode: "La entrega"
2008	Skip Tracer	Jennifer Orellana	Television film
2010	Carlos	Amparo	Episode: "Première partie"
2010	Lies in Plain Sight	Sofía Delgado	Television film
2011	CSI: Miami	Luisa Romero	Episode: "Stiff"
2013	Hawaii Five-0	Flora	Episode: "Aloha Ke Kahi I Ke Kahi"
2013	The List	María	Television film
2014	El Mariachi	Celeste Sandoval	
2014	Royal Pains	Viviana Torres	8 episodes
2017	Steven Universe	Topaz	Voice role, episode: "Stuck Together"
2018	Altered Carbon	Kristin Ortega	10 episodes
2018–2019	Queen of the South	Castel Fieto	8 episodes
2019	Into the Dark	Marisol	Episode: "Culture Shock"
2022	Monarch	Catt Phoenix	Main cast
