= La Doña (2016 TV series) =

2016 American television series

- Season 1 title card
- Genre: Telenovela
- Created by: José Vicente Spataro
- Based on: Doña Bárbara by Rómulo Gallegos
- Written by: Basilio Álvarez; Gerardo Cadena; Illay Eskinazi; José Vicente Spataro; Yutzil Martínez
- Screenplay by: Perla Farías
- Story by: Rómulo Gallegos
- Directed by: Carlos Villegas Rosales; Carlos Santos
- Creative director: Maru González
- Starring: See list
- Theme music composer: Samo; Edgar Barrera; Gianko Gómez; Andrés Castro
- Opening theme: "La Doña" by Aracely Arámbula
- Country of origin: United States
- Original language: Spanish
- No. of seasons: 2
- No. of episodes: 199 (list of episodes)

Production
- Executive producers: Mariana Iskandariani; Carmen Cecilia Urbaneja; Gabriela Valentán
- Producer: Héctor Sotelo Blancas
- Cinematography: Juan Pablo Ambris; Marc Bellver; Mariano Diluch; Consuelo Saldaña
- Editors: Carlos Leal; Nectario Márquez; Horacio Valle
- Camera setup: Multi-camera
- Production companies: Argos Comunicación; Telemundo Studios

Original release
- Network: Telemundo
- Release: 29 November 2016 – 27 April 2020

Related
- El Señor de los Cielos

La Doña is an American drama television series filmed entirely in Mexico, and created by José Vicente Spataro for Telemundo. The series is based on the 1929 novel of Venezuelan writer Rómulo Gallegos titled Doña Bárbara, which most recent version was, Doña Bárbara, starred Edith González. It is a production of Argos Comunicación and Telemundo Studios (now known as Telemundo Global Studios), and distributed by Telemundo Internacional. The series premiered on 29 November 2016, and revolves around of Altagracia Sandoval (Aracely Arámbula) a beautiful, elegant, successful woman, recognized in society and owner of an emporium in the construction world. Just as a young girl, she suffered two very strong traumas that marked her and made her the unforgiving "Doña" she is now.

On 9 May 2019, Telemundo confirmed through its upfront for the 2019-2020 television season that the series has been renewed for a second season.

== Seasons ==
| Season | Episodes | Originally released | |
| Season | Episodes | First released | Last released |
|---|---|---|---|
| 1 | 120 | 29 November 2016 | 1 May 2017 |
| 2 | 75 | 13 January 2020 | 27 April 2020 |

=== Season 1 (2016–17) ===
The plot revolves around Altagracia Sandoval (Aracely Arámbula), a woman who since her teenage years had to take care of her little sister and get ahead without her parents' help; who were brutally murdered along with her boyfriend by a group of five men called the Monkeys, who also raped her. As a young woman, after the death of her parents, Altagracia was under the care of her aunt Yesenia Sandoval (Rebecca Jones), who taught her to manipulate men and witchcraft. Thanks to her aunt, Altagracia meets Lázaro Hernández (Odiseo Bichir), the owner of a construction company, whom she seduces and manipulates with the help of her aunt. Subsequently Altagracia realizes that she is pregnant, and with the help of her aunt, manages to deceive Lázaro by making him believe that Altagracia's baby is his. And with more guidance from Yesenia, Altagracia makes Lázaro become an alcoholic and thus manages to take away his company and all his money, and then abandons him and her daughter.

Several years later, Altagracia is a businesswoman who owns the construction company Sandoval, formerly called Hernández. She has a family made up of her sister Regina Sandoval (Andrea Martí), and her niece Isabela Sandoval (Michelle Olvera). Altagracia is portrayed as a vindictive woman who does not mind hurting anyone to get what she wants. She has Braulio Padilla (José María Galeano), her lawyer, and Matamoros (Aquiles Cervantes), her bodyguard, who help her in her illicit businesses. The reason for Altagracia's vindictiveness is to take revenge on the five men who abused her and ruined her life. On her way to vengeance, she meets Saúl Aguirre (David Chocarro), a lawyer, whom she falls in love with. He changes her way of thinking towards men.

On the other hand, there is Mónica Hernández (Danna Paola), the daughter of Altagracia and Lázaro. Mónica is a young and sweet woman totally different from Altagracia, she seeks to make a living selling ham cakes. But the only problem between Mónica and Altagracia is that the two fall in love with the same man; without knowing that they are mother and daughter. After Altagracia finding out that Monica is Saul's lover, she tries to hurt her, even without knowing that she is her own daughter. After learning that Mónica is her daughter, Altagracia decides to leave her alone and help her financially. Despite changing her attitude with everyone who knows her, her desire for revenge towards the Monkeys remains intact. After killing Miguel Preciado, Alejandro Céspedes and Francisco Vega, she has two Monkeys left to kill. The only problem with the last two is that one of them is Daniel Llamas (Diego Soldano), who is now a good man who helps women who are victims of rape and domestic abuse. The other is Rafael Cabral (Juan Ríos), who is her right hand in all her illicit businesses and whom she's known all her life. In her pursuit of revenge, Altagracia has only one big problem: Saúl's love, which makes her love for her daughter fade away, creating conflict between them over the love of a man.

=== Season 2 (2020) ===
At the end of the previous season, Altagracia Sandoval decided to retire to start a new life after her daughter Mónica Hernández married Saúl Aguirre. Two years later, Mónica and Saúl Aguirre are still together, he as a lawyer at the head of the Renacer Foundation and she is a law student, and together with his aunt Regina fight to eradicate gender violence. This is not to the liking of those responsible for the crimes, including Los Arcoiris, a gang known for killing women after torturing them with paint bullets. Saúl thus becomes a victim by mysteriously disappearing. Concerned about the safety of her daughter, La Doña makes the decision to return to Mexico to look for her without caring that she has to face justice and meet up with José Luis Navarrete (David Zepeda), a businessman with whom she has many pending issues.

Everything becomes even more dangerous when Mónica also disappears and agent León Contreras (Carlos Ponce) links this fact with the band Los Arcoiris. Altagracia, however, resists believing this and suspects his enemies. Altagracia is not the only one who will fight for justice. She will also be accompanied by Noelia Molina (Paola Fernández), a young woman of humble origin who is also looking for her own culprits whom she blames for her sister's death. Together with León, they form a team with a common goal: to avenge the death and aggression of their loved ones.

== Crossover with El Señor de los Cielos ==
In the sixth season of El Señor de los Cielos, there is a crossover with La Doña, when the protagonist and main character of La Doña, Altagracia Sandoval or La Doña (Aracely Arámbula) becomes an unexpected ally of the main character and protagonist of El Señor de los Cielos, Aurelio Casillas or Señor de los Cielos (Rafael Amaya) after returning to Mexico after fleeing to France after the events in La Doña.

Another crossover between El Señor de los Cielos and La Doña occurs in the second season of La Doña when the characters Eunice Lara "La Felina" (Maricela González), and Amado Casillas "El Águila Azul" (Matías Novoa), two of the main characters of El Señor de los Cielos become recurring characters in La Doña.

== Ratings ==
Viewership and ratings per season of La Doña
| Season | Timeslot (ET) | Episodes | First aired | | Last aired | | Avg. viewers (millions) | 18–49 rank |
| Season | Timeslot (ET) | Episodes | Date | Viewers (millions) | Date | Viewers (millions) | Avg. viewers (millions) | 18–49 rank |
|---|---|---|---|---|---|---|---|---|
| 1 | Mon–Fri 9pm/8c | 120 | 29 November 2016 | 1.85 | 1 May 2017 | 1.71 | TBD | TBD |
| 2 | Mon–Fri 9pm/8c | 48 | 13 January 2020 | 1.03 | 27 April 2020 | 1.19 | 0.98 | TBD |

== Production ==
The telenovela was presented in Telemundo's upfront for the 2015-2016 television season. On June 6, 2016 Telemundo announced the start of the production of the telenovela and concluded their production in December 2016. It was filmed mostly in Mexico and several locations.

=== Concept ===
The series is only inspired by some moments of the life of Bárbara Guaymarán, the rest of the story was updated to the present time for the season of 2016. This adaptation, instead of being developed in a hacienda and in the countryside, takes place in Mexico City and the protagonist is in charge of running a construction company. Written by José Vicente Spataro and directed by Carlos Villegas, the series deals with issues such as corruption of the judicial system and the media, gangs and kidnappings, among other crimes.

== Awards and nominations ==
| Year | Award | Category | Recipient | Result |
|---|---|---|---|---|
| 2017 | Your World Awards | Favorite Series | La Doña | Won |
| 2017 | Your World Awards | Favorite Lead Actor | David Chocarro | Nominated |
| 2017 | Your World Awards | Favorite Lead Actress | Aracely Arámbula | Won |
| 2017 | Your World Awards | The Best Bad Boy | José María Galeano | Won |
| 2017 | Your World Awards | Favorite Actor | Odiseo Bichir | Nominated |
| 2017 | Your World Awards | Favorite Actress | Danna Paola | Nominated |
| 2017 | Your World Awards | The Perfect Couple | David Chocarro and Aracely Arámbula | Won |
| 2017 | Your World Awards | The Best Actor with Bad Luck | David Chocarro | Nominated |
