= List of La Doña episodes =

La Doña, is an American telenovela produced by Telemundo. It is based on the Venezuelan novel Doña Bárbara created by Rómulo Gallegos. It stars Aracely Arámbula as the titular character.

== Series overview ==
Season	Episodes	Originally released	
Season	Episodes	First released	Last released
1	120	29 November 2016	1 May 2017
2	75	13 January 2020	27 April 2020

== Episodes ==
=== Season 1 (2016–17) ===
No. overall	No. in season	Title	Original release date	US viewers (millions)
1	1	"Enmascarada"	29 November 2016	1.85
2	2	"Dos voluntades"	30 November 2016	1.64
3	3	"Desalojo brutal"	1 December 2016	1.72
4	4	"Sacrificio humano"	2 December 2016	1.67
5	5	"Cuerpo como arma"	5 December 2016	1.70
6	6	"Deseo disfrazado"	6 December 2016	1.74
7	7	"Tatuaje: ¿La pista?"	7 December 2016	1.65
8	8	"Asesino en la mira"	8 December 2016	N/A
9	9	"Confirmado"	9 December 2016	N/A
10	10	"Sello de amor"	12 December 2016	1.65
11	11	"Chantaje a la rival"	13 December 2016	N/A
12	12	"Fiera indomable"	14 December 2016	N/A
13	13	"Tortura al violador"	15 December 2016	N/A
14	14	"Hombría herida"	16 December 2016	N/A
15	15	"In fraganti"	19 December 2016	N/A
16	16	"Venganza denegada"	20 December 2016	N/A
17	17	"Desilusión"	21 December 2016	N/A
18	18	"Entregados a la pasión"	22 December 2016	N/A
19	19	"Guerra de divorciados"	23 December 2016	1.01
20	20	"Anuncio oficial"	26 December 2016	1.54
21	21	"Sospechoso"	27 December 2016	1.58
22	22	"Acorralado"	28 December 2016	1.38
23	23	"Pistas del crimen"	29 December 2016	1.43
24	24	"Madre insensible"	30 December 2016	1.16
25	25	"El dedo en la llaga"	2 January 2017	1.56
26	26	"Las dos Altagracias"	3 January 2017	1.58
27	27	"Hija al rescate"	4 January 2017	1.55
28	28	"Desconfianzas"	5 January 2017	1.58
29	29	"Coronel en la mira"	6 January 2017	1.26
30	30	"Rechazo que trae cola"	9 January 2017	1.52
31	31	"Justicia popular"	10 January 2017	N/A
32	32	"Policía encubridor"	11 January 2017	1.72
33	33	"Bandos opuestos"	12 January 2017	1.57
34	34	"Golpe por golpe"	13 January 2017	1.40
35	35	"Ciego de amor"	16 January 2017	1.68
36	36	"Vínculos revelados"	17 January 2017	1.60
37	37	"Enfrentadas por amor"	18 January 2017	1.54
38	38	"Celos enfermos"	19 January 2017	1.38
39	39	"Rival delatada"	20 January 2017	1.22
40	40	"Juicio comprado"	23 January 2017	1.62
41	41	"Odiada y amada"	24 January 2017	1.56
42	42	"En el infierno"	25 January 2017	1.49
43	43	"Engaño funesto"	26 January 2017	1.45
44	44	"Súplica de inocencia"	27 January 2017	1.42
45	45	"Dudas dolorosas"	30 January 2017	1.54
46	46	"Entregado al odio"	31 January 2017	1.57
47	47	"Unidos tras una pista"	1 February 2017	1.51
48	48	"Nueva enemiga"	2 February 2017	1.53
49	49	"Peligro inminente"	3 February 2017	1.29
50	50	"Vengada y vacía"	6 February 2017	1.54
51	51	"Hermana traidora"	7 February 2017	1.45
52	52	"Endurecida"	8 February 2017	1.42
53	53	"Dispuesto a todo"	9 February 2017	1.65
54	54	"Demasiados secretos"	10 February 2017	1.44
55	55	"Yesenia se redime"	13 February 2017	1.39
56	56	"A mano"	14 February 2017	1.34
57	57	"Beso protector"	15 February 2017	1.40
58	58	"Hija vapuleada"	16 February 2017	1.50
59	59	"Verdugos humillados"	17 February 2017	1.29
60	60	"Defensa contra reloj"	20 February 2017	1.50
61	61	"Castigo al valor"	21 February 2017	1.48
62	62	"Atrapada en su red"	22 February 2017	1.55
63	63	"Seducción por confesión"	23 February 2017	1.43
64	64	"Prueba insuficiente"	24 February 2017	1.64
65	65	"Mal por mal"	27 February 2017	1.48
66	66	"El soborno de Saúl"	28 February 2017	1.38
67	67	"Ximena paga su traición"	1 March 2017	1.45
68	68	"Mónica es tu hija"	2 March 2017	1.63
69	69	"Corazón de piedra"	3 March 2017	1.58
70	70	"Leona en celo"	6 March 2017	1.60
71	71	"Pavor de la verdad"	7 March 2017	1.45
72	72	"Alarde de amor"	8 March 2017	1.45
73	73	"Deseo irreprimible"	9 March 2017	1.48
74	74	"Remanso o torbellino"	10 March 2017	1.34
75	75	"En manos del violador"	13 March 2017	1.46
76	76	"Rafael es el anzuelo"	14 March 2017	1.50
77	77	"Inquebrantable"	15 March 2017	1.48
78	78	"Desengaño insoportable"	16 March 2017	1.51
79	79	"Divididos"	17 March 2017	N/A
80	80	"Misión cumplida"	20 March 2017	1.44
81	81	"A la deriva"	21 March 2017	1.39
82	82	"Muerte inconsolable"	22 March 2017	1.34
83	83	"Paternidad denegada"	23 March 2017	1.44
84	84	"La mujer de su vida"	24 March 2017	1.31
85	85	"Malos padres"	27 March 2017	1.27
86	86	"Mónica no se detiene"	29 March 2017	1.41
87	87	"Madre invocada"	30 March 2017	1.49
88	88	"Altagracia rescata a Mónica"	31 March 2017	1.43
89	89	"Hija vengada"	3 April 2017	1.58
90	90	"Mentira piadosa"	4 April 2017	1.22
91	91	"Dilema de Daniel"	4 April 2017	1.51
92	92	"Braulio se desquicia"	5 April 2017	1.19
93	93	"Anhelo de padre"	5 April 2017	1.51
94	94	"Temerosa de la ley"	6 April 2017	1.28
95	95	"La obsesión de Rafael"	6 April 2017	1.57
96	96	"Oásis de felicidad"	7 April 2017	1.33
97	97	"Monkey arrepentido"	7 April 2017	1.45
98	98	"La carta de Braulio"	10 April 2017	1.40
99	99	"Felipe contraataca"	10 April 2017	1.61
100	100	"Perdón tardío"	11 April 2017	1.37
101	101	"Acercamiento inevitable"	11 April 2017	1.51
102	102	"Braulio se fuga"	12 April 2017	1.39
103	103	"Daniel se muestra digno"	12 April 2017	1.63
104	104	"Felipe es acallado"	13 April 2017	1.31
105	105	"Desquite de Braulio"	13 April 2017	1.51
106	106	"El sacrificio de Yesenia"	14 April 2017	1.11
107	107	"Mónica repudia a Altagracia"	17 April 2017	1.22
108	108	"Adolfo recibe un no"	17 April 2017	1.57
109	109	"Salvado y manipulado"	18 April 2017	1.38
110	110	"Loba con piel de cordero"	18 April 2017	1.51
111	111	"Juego de celos"	19 April 2017	1.34
112	112	"Cercanos en el peligro"	19 April 2017	1.54
113	113	"Corazón amarrado"	20 April 2017	1.26
114	114	"Rafael contraataca"	20 April 2017	1.50
115	115	"La última venganza"	21 April 2017	1.19
116	116	"Razón de vivir"	21 April 2017	1.39
117	117	"Saúl, héroe de la jornada"	25 April 2017	1.36
118	118	"Una sola voz"	26 April 2017	1.32
119	119	"Altagracia humillada"	28 April 2017	1.23
120	120	"La Doña es perseguida"	1 May 2017	1.71

=== Season 2 (2020) ===
No. overall	No. in season	Title	Original release date	US viewers (millions)
121	1	"El regreso"	13 January 2020	1.03
122	2	"Detrás de la venganza"	14 January 2020	0.94
123	3	"En la mira de Arcoíris"	15 January 2020	0.87
124	4	"Dinero sucio"	16 January 2020	0.89
125	5	"Arranca el juicio a Altagracia"	17 January 2020	0.87
126	6	"Manipulaciones"	20 January 2020	1.02
127	7	"Nuevos socios"	21 January 2020	0.93
128	8	"Divide y vencerás"	22 January 2020	0.94
129	9	"La pista"	23 January 2020	1.04
130	10	"Todo por Mónica"	24 January 2020	0.97
131	11	"Encrucijada"	27 January 2020	1.08
132	12	"La guerra de Altagracia"	28 January 2020	0.99
133	13	"El despojo"	29 January 2020	1.07
134	14	"Toca fondo"	30 January 2020	1.06
135	15	"Revuelo en el funeral"	31 January 2020	1.00
136–137	16	"Truculentos deseos"	3 February 2020 (Note: This episode lasts for two hours, according to Telemundo, it is only counted as one episode and not as two episodes.)	1.00
138–139	17	"El plan b"	5 February 2020	0.94
140–141	18	"El traslado"	6 February 2020	0.88
142–143	19	"El olfato de León"	7 February 2020	0.73
144	20	"De la misma sangre"	10 February 2020	0.96
145	21	"Adorable mensajera"	11 February 2020	1.01
146	22	"Enemigo a la vista"	12 February 2020	0.93
147	23	"Atrapado en el infierno"	13 February 2020	0.94
148	24	"Embestida"	14 February 2020	0.75
149	25	"Psicópata a prueba"	17 February 2020	0.93
150	26	"Pasión desenfrenada"	18 February 2020	0.91
151	27	"Un loco suelto"	19 February 2020	0.89
152	28	"La gran batalla"	20 February 2020	1.01
153	29	"Formar a un Arcoíris"	21 February 2020	0.91
154	30	"Fiel hasta la muerte"	24 February 2020	0.98
155	31	"Ansias de matar"	25 February 2020	1.04
156	32	"La presa o la evidencia"	26 February 2020	0.88
157	33	"Ni un dedo encima"	27 February 2020	1.03
158	34	"El rompecabeza"	28 February 2020	1.03
159	35	"El error de la Doña"	2 March 2020	1.04
160	36	"Acorralado"	3 March 2020	1.02
161	37	"León va con todo"	4 March 2020	1.02
162	38	"La loca verdad"	5 March 2020	0.88
163	39	"Efecto dominó"	6 March 2020	1.00
164	40	"La sombra del pasado"	9 March 2020	1.04
165	41	"La Doña no perdona"	10 March 2020	1.05
166	42	"Unidos por el dolor"	11 March 2020	1.05
167	43	"Pierde la cabeza por amor"	12 March 2020	1.01
168	44	"Corazón de León"	13 March 2020	0.95
169	45	"Una zorra con clase"	16 March 2020	1.04
170	46	"Muertos que hablan"	17 March 2020	1.12
171	47	"La gran interrogante"	18 March 2020	1.04
172	48	"El plan de León se derrumba"	19 March 2020	1.10
173	49	"Un mal día para Navarrete"	20 March 2020	1.00
174	50	"Lo pasado pisado"	23 March 2020	1.25
175	51	"Cero fantasías"	24 March 2020	1.13
176	52	"La Doña fuera del juego"	25 March 2020	1.20
177	53	"Huele mal"	26 March 2020	1.13
178	54	"Miedo a perder"	27 March 2020	1.09
179	55	"Bochorno"	30 March 2020	1.05
180	56	"Una Felina que tiembla"	31 March 2020	1.08
181	57	"En fila para matar"	1 April 2020	1.02
182	58	"No aclare, que oscurece"	2 April 2020	1.10
183	59	"Un clavo saca otro clavo"	3 April 2020	0.95
184	60	"Por las buenas o por las malas"	6 April 2020	1.04
185	61	"Altagracia nunca rinde cuentas"	7 April 2020	0.9
186	62	"El enemigo en tu cama"	8 April 2020	1.10
187	63	"Un paso en falso"	9 April 2020	0.95
188	64	"Golpe al ego de Altagracia"	10 April 2020	0.96
189	65	"El precio de la venganza"	13 April 2020	1.02
190	66	"El zarpazo mortal"	14 April 2020	1.07
191	67	"Seducción infalible"	15 April 2020	0.99
192	68	"Mentes perversas"	16 April 2020	1.03
193	69	"La cacería"	17 April 2020	1.05
194	70	"La confesión"	20 April 2020	1.03
195	71	"No toquen a Regina"	21 April 2020	0.97
196	72	"El rescate"	22 April 2020	1.18
197	73	"El que las hace, las paga"	23 April 2020	1.13
198	74	"De la misma medicina"	24 April 2020	1.05
199	75	"El intercambio"	27 April 2020	1.19

== Specials ==
=== La Doña, edición especial (2019–20) ===
On 20 December 2019, Telemundo announced the premiere of the first season, now in a limited edition of a few episodes, which will air throughout December until the premiere of the second season on 13 January 2020.

No.	Title	Original release date	US viewers (millions)
1	"Deseo disfrazado"	23 December 2019	0.76
Altagracia Sandoval makes Jaime Aguirre arrested. Saúl, his son and lawyer faces her. La Doña changes strategy and withdraws the complaint. Mónica arrives in the capital and meets Saúl.
2	"Fiera indomable"	25 December 2019	0.59
La Doña ties ends with the tattoo of the criminals who raped her and killed her parents. She travels to Veracruz, Mexico, to confirm that Miguel Preciado belongs to the band of Los Monkys.
3	"Hombría herida"	26 December 2019	0.75
Felipe discovers that Altagracia used his position to get the land and charges all humiliations. La Doña announces that the legal battle against the neighborhood of the Aguirre came to an end
4	"Las dos Altagracia"	27 December 2019	0.63
Altagracia confesses to Saul his most painful secret as proof of pure love. Felipe wakes up with a gun in his hand. Altagracia learns that Monica was abandoned by her mother at birth.
5	"Justicia popular"	30 December 2019	0.71
Felipe confirms that Mónica is Altagracia's daughter. Emiliano runs over Lydia and flees with Isabela. Yesenia reveals her identity in front of Lazaro's daughter. Doña goes after another of Los Monkeys
6	"Dudas dolorosas"	1 January 2020	0.54
Mónica confesses to Saúl that she loves him. Jaime looks for Altagracia, there she is in a compromised situation. With the complicity of Lázaro, Yesenia lies about the innocence of La Doña.
7	"Unidos tras una pista"	2 January 2020	0.78
La Doña thinks that Mónica is a great danger to her and orders that they investigate her. Saúl is willing to kill to do justice for the death of his father and blames Altagracia.
8	"Fiera indomable"	3 January 2020	0.60
La Doña ties ends with the tattoo of the criminals who raped her and killed her parents. She travels to Veracruz to confirm that Miguel Preciado belongs to the band of Los Monkys.
9	"Corazón de piedra"	6 January 2020	0.68
Regina confirms to her sister the truth about her daughter. Mónica asks Saúl not to see La Doña anymore, whom he sees as the woman who upsets him. She looks for Francisco Vega, the fourth Monkey.
10	"Las dos Altagracias"	7 January 2020	0.78
Altagracia confesses to Saúl his most painful secret as proof of pure love. Felipe wakes up with a gun in his hand. La Doña finds out that Mónica was abandoned by her mother at birth.
11	"La dolorosa verdad"	8 January 2020	0.81
Altagracia wants to protect her daughter from the Monkey who is still alive. Mónica tells Saúl the truth. She finds out who her true father is. Braulio and Rafael team up to end La Doña.
12	"Dudas dolorosas"	9 January 2020	0.71
Mónica confesses to Saúl that she loves him. Jaime looks for Altagracia, there she is in a compromised situation. With the complicity of Lázaro, Yesenia lies about the innocence of La Doña.
13	"Unidos tras una pista"	10 January 2020	0.74
La Doña thinks that Mónica is a great danger to her and orders that they investigate her. Saúl is willing to kill to do justice for the death of his father and blames Altagracia.
