= Dulce familia =

- Directed by: Nicolás López
- Screenplay by: Guillermo Amoedo; Coca Gómez
- Starring: Fernanda Castillo; Vadhir Derbez
- Cinematography: Antonio Quercia
- Edited by: Diego Macho Gómez
- Music by: Manuel Riveiro
- Production companies: Bh5; Tiki Pictures
- Distributed by: BF Distribution
- Release date: 10 May 2019 (Mexico)
- Country: Mexico
- Language: Spanish

Dulce familia is a 2019 Mexican comedy film directed by Nicolás López. The film premiered on 10 May 2019, and is stars Fernanda Castillo, and Vadhir Derbez. The plot revolves around Tamy (Castillo), a woman who faces her overweight when she is about to get married, because she wants to wear the same wedding dress as her mother, Verónica (Florinda Meza), a famous telenovela actress obsessed with her physical image and which due to its age has been relegated on television.

== Plot ==
Dulce familia is a comedy about five women of different generations and their respective fears, eating disorders, diets and sugar addiction. Tamy) will undergo all unimaginable tortures to lose 10 kilos in two months and be able to use the wedding dress her mother used. In this impossible mission, Tamy will be accompanied by her sisters Bárbara and Ale and her bitter mother Verónica who make up this family.

== Cast ==
- Fernanda Castillo as Tamy
- Vadhir Derbez as Beto
- Florinda Meza as Verónica
- Regina Blandón as Bárbara
- Paz Bascuñán as Ale
- Luciano Cruz-Coke as Director Canal
- Roberto Flores as Sacerdote
- Boris Quercia as Carlos
- Ariel Levy as Presentador
- Mirella Granucci as Melina
