= Do It Like an Hombre =

- Theatrical release poster
- Spanish: Hazlo como hombre
- Directed by: Nicolás López
- Screenplay by: Guillermo Amoedo; Nicolás López
- Story by: Nicolás López
- Produced by: Miguel Asensio Llamas; Rodrigo Trujillo
- Starring: Mauricio Ochmann; Alfonso Dosal; Aislinn Derbez
- Cinematography: Antonio Quercia
- Edited by: Diego Macho Gómez
- Music by: Manuel Riveiro
- Production companies: Sobras International Pictures; A Toda Madre Entertainment; Bh5
- Distributed by: Videocine (Mexico); Pantelion Films (United States)
- Release date: 10 August 2017 (Mexico)
- Running time: 109 minutes
- Countries: Chile; Mexico
- Language: Spanish
- Budget: $0.8 million
- Box office: $13.61 million

Do It Like an Hombre (Spanish: Hazlo como hombre) is a 2017 comedy film co-written and directed by the Chilean director Nicolás López. The film stars an ensemble cast including Mauricio Ochmann, Alfonso Dosal, Aislinn Derbez, Humberto Busto, Ignacia Allamand and Ariel Levy.

The plot centers on Raúl (Ochmann) and his reaction to the revelation that his best friend, Santiago (Dosal), is gay, as well as his efforts to convince Santiago to become straight again. Originally titled Amigos gay, the screenplay was co-written by López and Guillermo Amoedo to encourage Latin American audiences to reflect on their derogatory use of the word gay.

Do It Like an Hombre received mixed reviews but was a box-office success, grossing US$13.61 million against a budget of US$800,000. In Mexico, it grossed almost US$11 million, making it one of the highest-grossing Mexican films. The film has been remade twice, as Cosas de hombres (2020) in Chile and Cosas de amigos (2022) in Peru.

== Plot ==
Raúl is a traditional, machist, and foul-mouthed man who has been friends with Santiago and Eduardo since childhood. The three lead a stereotypically masculine lifestyle, playing football and teasing one another. Santiago is engaged to Raúl's sister, Nati, whom he has been dating for five years. However, Santiago begins to question his sexuality and, after a sexual encounter with Julián, a celebrity chef, decides to come out as gay to his friends. Eduardo, a barber with a more liberal outlook, accepts the news, but Raúl does not.

Raúl decides that Santiago is on the wrong path, despite Eduardo and Luciana, Raúl's pregnant wife, urging him to let Santiago live his own life. When Nati discovers that Santiago is gay, she breaks up with him. She gradually comes to terms with the separation, gets a makeover with Eduardo and begins spending more time with him. Raúl's therapist, who is aware of his anger outbursts, assumes that Raúl is talking about himself when he describes Santiago's coming out. The therapist tells Raúl that he is going through the five stages of grief because he views the situation as a disruption to the established order.

Raúl repeatedly tries to convince Santiago to become straight, including with a conversion therapy, but his efforts only push Santiago away. Meanwhile, Luciana discovers that Raúl has been cheating on her with women online and leaves him. Overwhelmed by both events, Raúl slowly begins to accept that the problem is actually him. Before moving to Miami to accompany Julián at the opening of his new restaurant, Santiago discovers that Julián is polyamorous, breaks up with him, and reconciles with Raúl.

Years later, Santiago is dating José, a coworker of Eduardo's, while Eduardo and Nati are also in a relationship. Raúl has accepted José and treats him like one of his friends. Luciana remains separated from Raúl, but after seeing that he has changed, she decides to give him a second chance, although reluctantly. However, after she drops off their son and that he prefers to play with a doll rather than other toys, Raúl begins to worry again.

== Cast ==
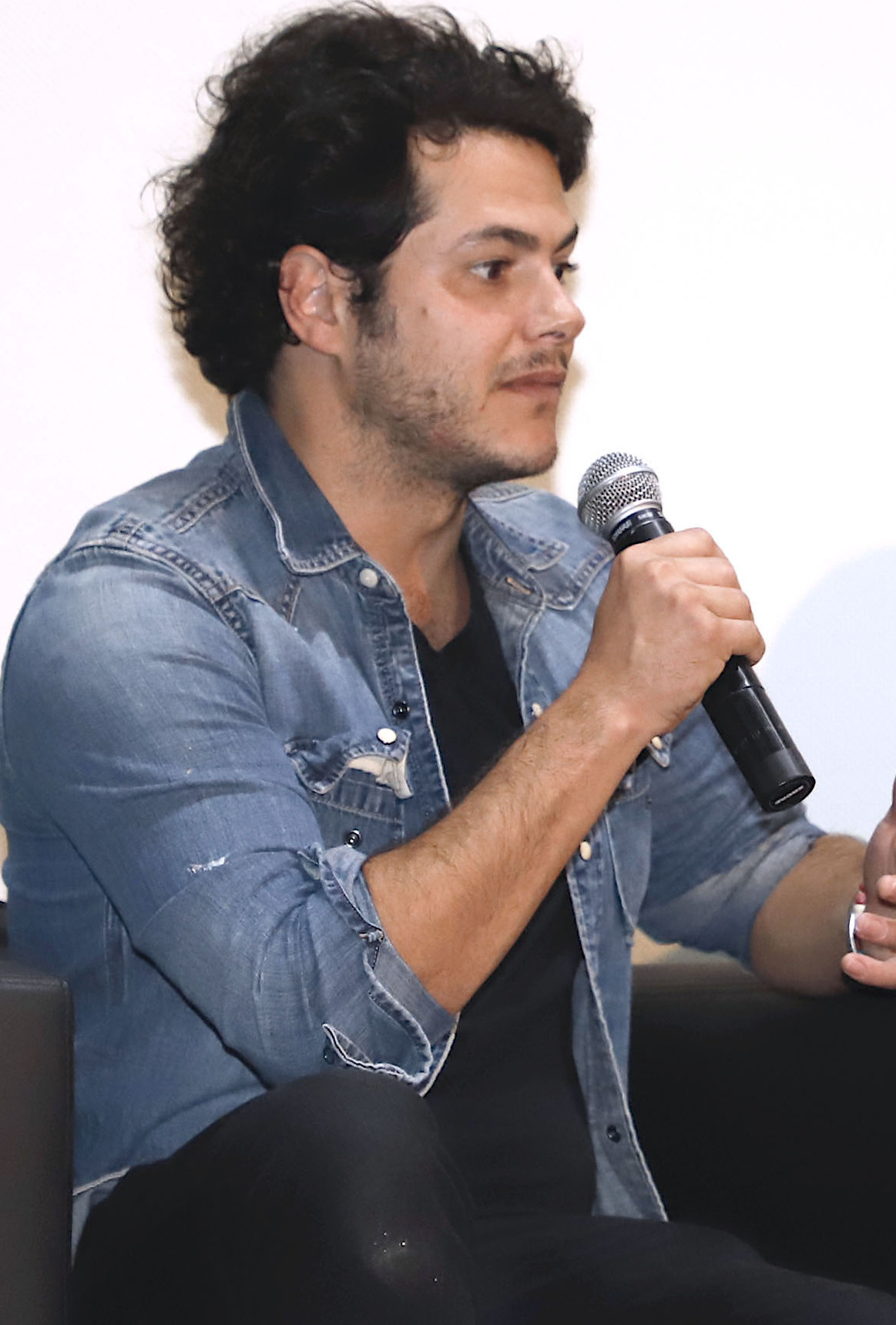
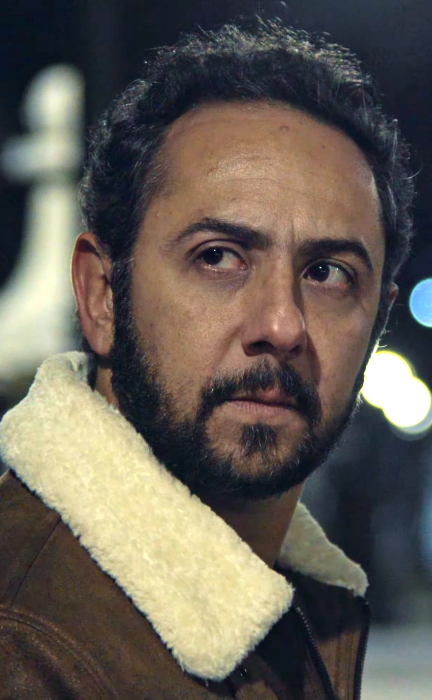
The main ensemble cast of Do It Like an Hombre, from left to right: Mauricio Ochmann, Aislinn Derbez, Alfonso Dosal, and Humberto Busto
- Mauricio Ochmann as Raúl
- Alfonso Dosal as Santiago
- Aislinn Derbez as Nati, Santiago's girlfriend
- Humberto Busto as Eduardo
- Ignacia Allamand as Luciana, Raúl's wife
- Ariel Levy as Julián, Santiago's boyfriend
- Luis Pablo Román as Raúl's therapist
- Arturo Vásquez as José, Eduardo's coworker

== Production ==
A comedy film, Do It Like an Hombre was filmed in Chile, with a cost of US$800,000. It was co-produced by Miguel Asensio Llamas and Rodrigo Trujillo through the Chilean company Sobras International Pictures, owned by López, and the Mexican companies Bh5 and A Toda Madre Entertainment (ATM). The latter is co-owned by Ochmann and Derbez, who were married at the time, and the film was their first project together after their wedding, as well as ATM's first production.

Do It Like an Hombre, originally titled in Spanish Hazlo como hombre (English: 'Do It Like a Man'), was directed by the Chilean director Nicolás López, who co-wrote the script with Guillermo Amoedo. The idea was inspired by López's conversations with friends in Mexico about coming out in different Latin American cultures, the growing number of people in their 30s who were coming out, and those who did not seem to fit the conventional stereotypes about gay men. At the same time, he wanted to avoid turning it into a typical coming-out drama. López said that gay characters are often the butt of jokes in comedies, so he sought to reverse this dynamic by making the homophobic character the target instead.

Ochmann considers the Spanish-language title irreverent and ironic rather than machist, explaining that, to him, "being a man means facing your fears and insecurities, tapping into your sensitive side, getting in touch with your feelings, and embracing life". The English-language title references Donald Trump's use of the word hombre during the 2016 United States presidential debates. It was originally titled Amigos gay ('Gay Friends'), but López was advised to change the title because of society's stigma attached to the word gay. He also noted that the film seeks to encourage Latin American audiences to reflect on the derogatory use of the word gay, describing Do It Like an Hombre as a story about love and friendship among a group of friends whose relationships are tested by an unexpected problem.

Dosal appreciated that the film avoids caricaturing gay people, and added that clichés should not be feared, as they reflect society. For Ochmann, it aims to help the audience relate to the situations and ponder on the acceptance of differences, while broadening their perspectives and leaving them free to form their own opinions and hold their own beliefs. Busto said it portrays the importance of accepting oneself and others, and to be tolerant of friends, as they may sometimes act or think differently than expected.

Antonio Quercia was the cinematographer and Diego Macho Gómez its editor. The film's score was composed by Manuel Riveiro. The theme song is titled "Baila como hombre" ('Dance Like a Man'), performed by Me Llamo Sebastián, who dedicated it to Daniel Zamudio, a gay man murdered in Chile in 2012.

== Release ==
Do It Like an Hombre premiered on 10 August 2017 in Mexico, and 1 September 2017 in the US. It was distributed in Mexico by Videocine, and Pantelion Films (subsidiary of Lionsgate Films) in the US. It debuted with more than 2,000 theaters in Mexico. Following its success there, its distributors sought to expand its US release to almost 400 theaters after initially being planned for a more limited rollout. Elsewhere, it was released in Bolivia, Colombia, and Peru.

== Reception ==
=== Critical response ===
On the review aggregator website Rotten Tomatoes, 56% of critics' reviews are positive, based on nine critics. In opinion of Lucero Calderón of Excélsior, Do It Like an Hombre relies on clichés to appeal to audiences. Lucero Solórzano, writing for the same publication, praised Dosal's performance as restrained and free of stereotypes, as well as those of Busto, Allamand, and Román, but criticized Ochmann's as over-the-top and Derbez's as strident.

Randy Cordova praised the film for The Arizona Republic, caling it "high-spirited, buoyant and full of laughs", and applauded Ochmann for not turning his character into a "cartoon villain". He also compared Raúl to Archie Bunker, a characted from the sitcom All in the Family, who, in his view, has to be seen "with disdain, not approval". On the opposite, in a negative review by Monica Castillo of The New York Times, she describes Raúl as a one-dimensional, unbearable character overly focused on his friend's sexuality when the rest of the characters take it in stride, and said the script was outdated. Likewise, Manuel Betancourt of Remezcla describes it as "a '90s U.S. comedy that was as well-meaning as it was ill-conceived".

For Gary Kramer of Philadelphia Gay News, despite its exaggerated homophobic clichés, Do It Like an Hombre promotes tolerance through its plot, with other characters discussing sexual practices between men openly and naturally. Similarly, Michael Ordona of Common Sense Media gave a positive review for its message of acceptance.

The American LGBTQ rights organization GLAAD criticized it as especially homophobic in its 2018 report "Studio Responsibility Index", says that Do It Like an Hombre could have intended to highlight bigotry, but in the organization's consideration prejudice as a source of humor does not necessarily challenge it. GLAAD also portrays Raúl as a one-dimensional character whose homophobia persists throughout, with little meaningful development in his understanding of acceptance by the end. The organization concludes that, although it passes the Vito Russo test, which assesses the depth and narrative significance of LGBTQ characters in films, "it does not stop the film from being incredibly offensive".

In response to negative reviews, López remarked that "sexism and homophobia are very prevalent" in society and that "anyone who doesn't want to see that is living in a bubble".

=== Audience ===
Do It Like an Hombre became a box-office success. It debuted at number one in Mexico during the weekend ending on 13 August 2017, attracting more than three million moviegoers, and grossing more than US$1.5 million. It became the highest-grossing Mexican film of the year, surpassing 3 Idiotas, and the third-highest opening for a Mexican film at the time. Despite this, Alberto Nájar of BBC Mundo observed that Do It Like an Hombre received less media attention than other similar films, such as Nosotros los Nobles, possibly because of its themes.

One month after its release, Do It Like an Hombre had already become the fifth highest-grossing Mexican film. As of 2026, it remained the ninth most-watched Mexican film. In the United States, Do It Like an Hombre grossed US$2.5 million, including US$2.1 million in its first 12 days, despite Hurricane Irma and flooding in Texas. In Bolivia, it grossed over US$77,000, and in Colombia almost US$6,000.

== Remakes ==
In 2018, Bh5 announced a remake titled Hazte hombre ('Become a Man'), starring Marcial Tagle, Boris Quercia and Paz Bascuñán. The plot would remain the same, but with 50-year-old characters. It premiered in January 2020 with the title Cosas de hombres ('Men's Stuff'). In 2022, Do It Like an Hombre was remade as Cosas de amigos ('Friends' Stuff'), directed by the Peruvian filmmaker Giovanni Ciccia.
