= A Woman With No Filter =

- Theatrical release poster
- Spanish: Una mujer sin filtro
- Directed by: Luis Eduardo Reyes
- Written by: Diego Ayala; Ángel Pulido
- Story by: Nicolás López
- Based on: No Filter by Nicolás López
- Starring: Fernanda Castillo
- Cinematography: Antonio Quercia
- Edited by: Diego Macho Gómez
- Music by: Manuel Riveiro
- Production company: Sobras International Pictures
- Release date: 12 January 2018 (Mexico)
- Running time: 90 minutes
- Country: Mexico
- Language: Spanish

A Woman With No Filter (Spanish: Una mujer sin filtro) is a 2018 Mexican comedy film directed by Luis Eduardo Reyes and starring Fernanda Castillo. It is an adaptation on the Chilean film created by Nicolás López titled No Filter. The film premiered on January 12, 2018 in Mexico.

== Plot ==
Paz is a woman who, out of kindness, has allowed everyone around her to treat her as if she were worthless, keeping silent what she thinks so as not to hurt feelings. Until one day, she suppresses her social filter and expresses what she really feels.

== Cast ==
- Fernanda Castillo as Paz López
- Carmen Aub as Emilia
- Eugenio Bartilotti as Psiquiatra
- Sofia Niño de Rivera as Dominica
- Nicolás López as Amigo extraño
- Ariel Levy
- Flavio Medina
- Alejandro Calva
