= Qué pena tu vida (2016 film) =

2016 Mexican film

- Directed by: Luis Eduardo Reyes
- Screenplay by: Ángel Pulido; Valentín Trujillo
- Based on: Qué pena tu vida by: Nicolás López; Guillermo Amoedo
- Starring: José María de Tavira; Aislinn Derbez; Ilse Salas
- Cinematography: Erwin Jaquez
- Edited by: Óscar Figueroa
- Music by: Yayo González
- Production companies: A Toda Madre Entertainment; Balero Films; Sobras International Pictures; Bh5
- Distributed by: Videocine (theatrical)
- Release date: 2 December 2016 (Mexico)
- Running time: 100 minutes
- Country: Mexico
- Language: Spanish
- Box office: $1,604,289

Qué pena tu vida is a 2016 Mexican romantic comedy film directed by Luis Eduardo Reyes. The film is a Mexican adaptation of the 2010 Chilean film of the same name directed by Nicolás López. It stas José María de Tavira, Aislinn Derbez, and Ilse Salas. The film had a budget between 20 million and 25 million pesos, and it premiered on 2 December 2016 in Mexico.

== Plot ==
Javier is a young designer with a promising future, but there is one detail: he has just finished his relationship with his girlfriend. Blinded by spite, he will lead his life to chaos and begin a path of bad decisions that lead him to the most absurd and fun situations, all this while trying to recover Sofía and if it is not possible, then forget her. With the help of Andrea, her best friend, she will try to find herself, but not before meeting the strangest and craziest characters in the city.

== Cast ==
- José María de Tavira as Javier
- Aislinn Derbez as Andrea
- Ilse Salas as Sofía
- Álvaro Guerrero as Comisario Rafael Pérez
- Fabiola Campomanes as Lorena
- Rosa María Bianchi as Patricia
- Leonardo de Lozanne as Paul Izquierdo
- Fernanda Castillo as Úrsula
- Marcus Ornellas as Tigre
- Arturo Barba as Lorena's ex-boyfriend
- Alejandro Calva as Car seller
