= Sin Pepitas en la Lengua =

- Film poster
- Directed by: Carlos García de Paredes; Juan Carlos García de Paredes
- Written by: Nicolás Lopez
- Based on: Sin filtro by Nicolás López
- Produced by: Carlos García de Paredes
- Starring: Ash Olivera
- Cinematography: Pavlos Petras
- Edited by: Juan Carlos García de Paredes
- Music by: Angelo Milli
- Production companies: Vertical Media, Inc.
- Release date: August 9, 2018
- Running time: 87 minutes
- Country: Panama
- Language: Spanish

Sin Pepitas en la Lengua (lit. 'No Nuggets on the Tongue') is a 2018 Panamanian comedy film directed by the brothers Carlos García de Paredes and Juan Carlos García de Paredes and starring Argentine actress Ash Olivera. The film is a remake of the Chilean film No Filtrer (Sin filtro) that premiered in 2016.

== Synopsis ==
Isa, who is aggravated by her life, decides to visit a non-traditional doctor. Through the use of hypnotherapy, Isa discovers that her pain is caused by repressed feelings and that the way to heal herself is to say whatever she thinks.

== Cast ==
- Ash Olivera as Isa Montero.
- Agustín Gonçalves as Antonio.
- Juan Carlos Garcia de Paredes as Gabriel.
- Ingrid Villareal as Ines.
- Simón Tejeira Healy as Nicolás.
- Diego de Obaldia as Pablo.
- Sara Faretra as Maricarmen.
- Camila Aybar as Andrea Alvarado.
- Miroslava Morales as Marta.
- Victor Villarreal as Carlos.
- Samuel Ibarra as Bicho.
- Randy Dominguez as Ken Lee.
- Jonathan Harker as HRKR.
- Diego Barbish as Javier.
- Cruz De Jesús Cano as Biencuidao.
- Dayana Salazar as Cony.

== Production ==
The filming took place in Panama City during the months of October and November 2017. It was recorded between Casco Viejo, Costa del Este and the Barrio Chino de la Central, in total, the post-production lasted 5 weeks, and the shooting 4 weeks.

== Release and festivals ==
The film was released commercially on August 9, 2019, It also participated in the Latino Film Market 2019 in New York City. The film has also been shortlisted to represent Panama at the 2019 Platinum Awards.
