= Fernanda Castillo =

Mexican actress (born 1982)

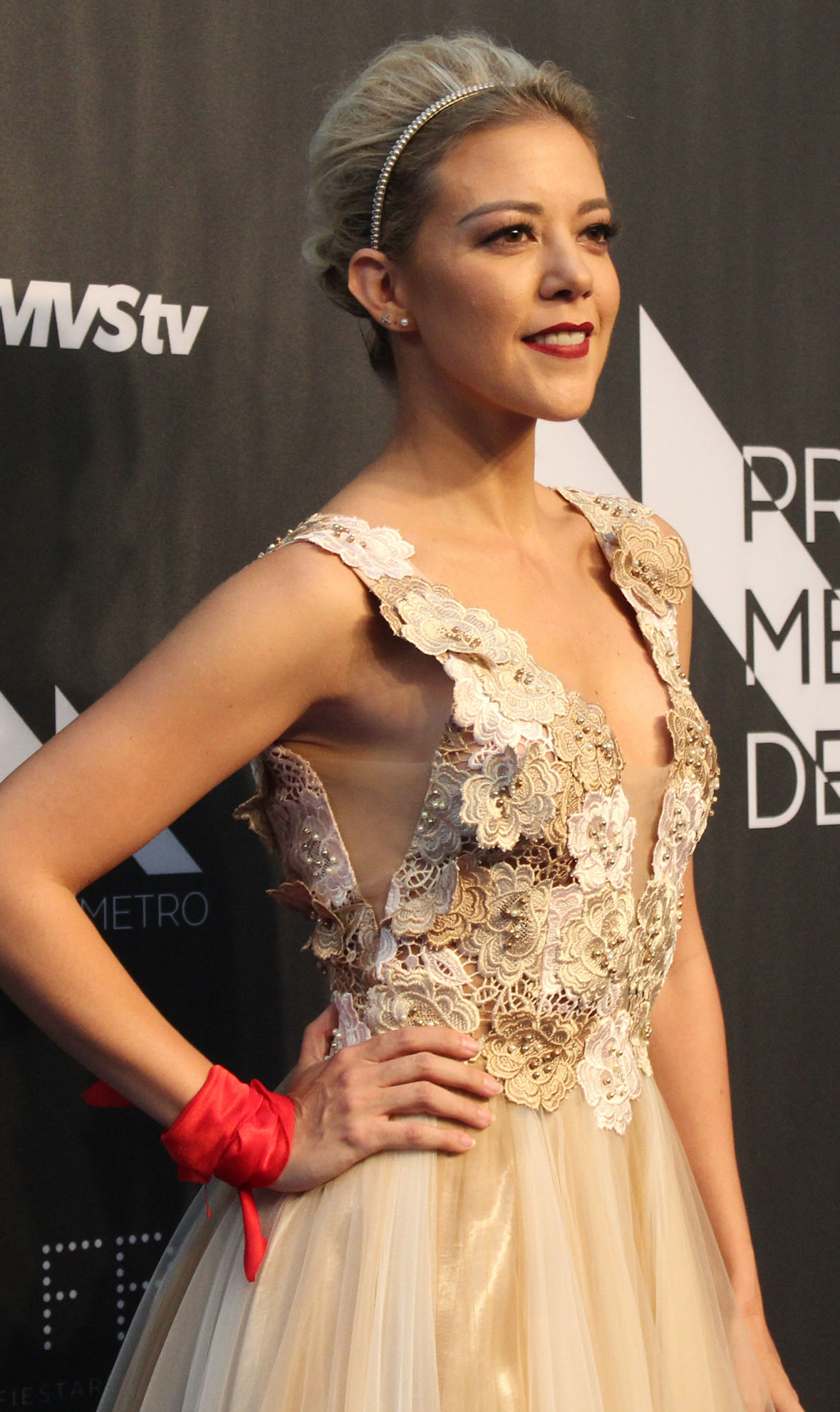
- Castillo at the 2019 Metropolitan Theatre Awards
- Born: María Fernanda Castillo García; 24 March 1982 (age 43); Hermosillo, Sonora, Mexico
- Occupation: Actress
- Years active: 2000–present
- Partner: Erik Hayser (2014–present)
- Children: 1

María Fernanda Castillo García (born 24 March 1982), known as Fernanda Castillo, is a Mexican actress. She is best known for her work in several telenovelas, including her role as Mónica Robles in El Señor de los Cielos.

== Career ==
Since her childhood, Castillo has been interested in acting, which led her to become a classical and jazz dancer at a young age. She studied at the Centro de Educación Artística of Televisa for three years and graduated in 2003, almost immediately she was named "Chica E! Entertainment" which earned her recognition in the industry. In 2003, she was named "El rostro de El Heraldo" and was the face of the Acapulco Festival. That same year she played Camila in the telenovela Clap, el lugar de tus sueños, although she had previously appeared in other telenovelas such as Mi destino eres tú, Las vías del amor, and in the series Mujer, casos de la vida real. After finishing Clap, el lugar de tus sueños, she dedicated herself to doing musical theater.

In 2005, she acted in the film Corazón marchito, which was eventually released in 2007. In 2006, she joined Cabaret as a dancer, and later she did casting for Nacho Cano's musical work, Hoy no me puedo levantar, securing the lead role of María. She had a short participation in the telenovela La fea más bella. In 2007, she balanced her work in theater with a role in the telenovela Destilando amor. In 2008, she had a small part in Gael García's first film as director, Déficit. In that same year, after finishing the season of Hoy no me puedo levantar, she was invited to participate in the Spanish production of the musical, prompting her to move to Spain. After being away from Mexico for several years and away from telenovelas, in 2010, she participated in the series Mujeres asesinas in the episode "Eliana, Cuñada", and later joined the cast of Teresa, a remake of the 1959 telenovela, where she played Luisa de la Barrera Azuela, the protagonist's sister.

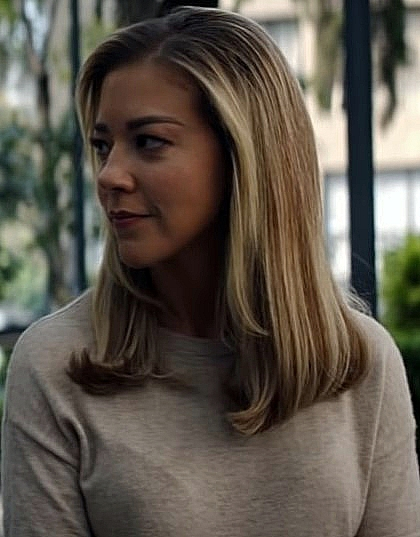
Castillo as Alejandra in the 2018 Mexican film Ya veremos.

In 2011, she appeared in the series Como dice el dicho in the episode "No todo lo que brilla es oro..." and later concluded her contract with Televisa, participating in the telenovela Amor bravío. In 2013, she joined the Spanish-speaking network Telemundo, as part of the cast of the telenovela El Señor de los Cielos, where she played Mónica Robles. Her performance earned her several award nominations, winning two Premios Tu Mundo as Favorite Lead Actress. In 2016, she had a special appearance in the series El Chema, reprising her role as Mónica Robles. In 2017 she had a special participation in the telenovela La Fan, and in that same year concluded her participation in the series El Señor de los Cielos.

In 2018, she got her first leading role in the film Una mujer sin filtro, a Mexican adaptation of the Chilean film No Filter. Later that year, she got her first leading role in the telenovela Enemigo íntimo, which she starred in alongside Raúl Méndez, with whom she previously worked in El Señor de los Cielos. Subsequently, she appeared in the films Sacúdete las penas, and Ya veremos, sharing credits with Mauricio Ochmann. To end the year, she starred alongside Jorge Salinas in the film Mi pequeño gran hombre. In 2019, she starred in the film Dulce familia, where she had to gain weight to play the main character.

She signed an overall deal with Pantaya, under which she will star in the streaming platform's upcoming projects.

== Filmography ==
=== Film roles ===
Year	Title	Roles	Notes
2007	Corazón marchito	Karina	
2007	Déficit	Unknown role	
2007	Shakespeare tuvo una hermana	Marcela	Short film
2013	El huésped	Unknown role	Short film
2016	Rumbos paralelos	Adriana	
2016	No manches Frida	Caro	
2016	Qué pena tu vida	Úrsula	
2018	Una mujer sin filtro	Paz López	
2018	Sacúdete las penas	María	
2018	Ya veremos	Alejandra	
2018	Mi pequeño gran hombre	Ivana Cornejo	
2019	Día de muertos	Salma (voice)	
2019	No manches Frida 2	Caro	
2019	En las buenas y en las malas	Theatre actress	
2019	Dulce familia	Tamy	
2020	Cuidado con lo que deseas	Nuria	
2022	Ojos que no ven	Andrea	
2022	Viajeros perdidos en el tiempo	Sandra	
2023	¡Patos!	Pam (voice)	Spanish dubbing
2024	Technoboys	Coquis Topete	Netflix film
2025	The Follies		Netflix film

=== Television roles ===
Year	Title	Roles	Notes
2000	Mi destino eres tú	Extra in Wedding	
2002	Las vías del amor	Mónica Loyola	
2002–2005	Mujer, casos de la vida real	Various characters	7 episodes
2003	Clap, el lugar de tus sueños	Camila	
2006	La fea más bella	Claudia	
2007	Destilando amor	Daniela Montalvo	Recurring role; 162 episodes
2010	Mujeres asesinas	Joana Palacios	Episode: "Eliana, Cuñada"
2010–2011	Teresa	Luisa de la Barrera Azuela	Main role; 147 episodes
2011	Como dice el dicho	Aura	Episode: "No todo lo que brilla es oro..."
2012	Amor bravío	Viviana del Valle	Recurring role; 144 episodes
2013–2017	El Señor de los Cielos	Mónica Robles	Recurring role (season 1); main role (seasons 2–5); 420 episodes
2016	El Chema	Mónica Robles	Episode: "Narco en la TV"
2017	La Fan	La Parka	2 episodes
2018–2020	Enemigo íntimo	Roxana Rodiles	Main role (season 1-2); 113 episodes
2020	Monarca	Sofia Carranza	Main role (season 2)
2023	Isla brava	Lucía	Main role

== Awards and nominations ==
Year	Award	Category	works	Result
2013	2nd Your World Awards	The Best Bad Girl	El Señor de los Cielos	Nominated
2014	3rd Your World Awards	The Best Bad Girl	El Señor de los Cielos	Nominated
2014	3rd Your World Awards	The Perfect Couple (with Rafael Amaya)	El Señor de los Cielos	Nominated
2015	4th Your World Awards	Favorite Lead Actress	El Señor de los Cielos	Won
2016	5th Your World Awards	Favorite Lead Actress	El Señor de los Cielos	Won
2017	6th Your World Awards	Favorite Lead Actress	El Señor de los Cielos	Nominated
