= Aaron Burns =

AAmerican film producer, actor, film director (born 1985)

- Born: January 28, 1985 (age 41); Houston, Texas, United States
- Occupations: producer, actor, film director, screenwriter, film editor, cinematographer
- Years active: 2005–present

Aaron Burns (born January 28, 1985) is an American film producer, actor, film director, screenwriter, film editor, and cinematographer. Burns is a frequent collaborator with horror director Eli Roth.

== Filmography ==
Year	Title	Role	Notes
2005	Sin City		Graphic Designer
2007	Grindhouse		2D Artist
2008	Eastern College		VFX Supervisor
2010	Now or Never		Writer/Director
2010	Machete		Senior Compositor
2011	Blacktino		Writer/Director/Editor/Producer
2012	Aftershock		Camera Operator
2012	Que Pena Tu Familia		Camera Operator
2012	V/H/S		Special thanks
2013	Best Worst Friends	Usnavy	
2013	The Green Inferno	Jonah	Senior VFX Generalist; Second Unit Director/Director of Photography
2014	The Stranger	Officer Harris	
2015	Knock Knock	Louis	
2016	Madre		
