= Downhill (2016 film) =

- Directed by: Patricio Valladares
- Written by: Patricio Valladares; Barry Keating
- Produced by: Cristóbal Braun Mesples; Patricio Valladares; George Von Knorring; Cristián Yáñez Barbieri; Barry Keating; Pablo Guisa Koestinger
- Starring: Natalie Burn; Bryce Draper; Ariel Levy; Luke Massy; Ignacia Allamand; Matias Lopez
- Cinematography: Cristian Ali Venegas
- Edited by: Patricio Valladares
- Music by: Luigi Seviroli
- Production companies: Too Much Films; Cbra Films; Vallastudio Pictures.
- Distributed by: WTFILMS Sales.
- Release date: August 24, 2016 (SANFIC Film Festival)
- Running time: 82 minutes
- Country: Chile
- Languages: English; Spanish

Downhill is a 2016 Chilean thriller film directed by Patricio Valladares, who also co-wrote the screenplay with Barry Keating.

== Plot ==
After his best friend dies in a racing accident, biking star Joe agrees to participate in an exhibition race in Chile. While on a test run with his girlfriend, Stephanie, they stumble upon a badly injured man who is dying from a mysterious virus. This discovery sets off a chain of events that leads to a dangerous situation as they become the targets of ruthless killers who will do anything to keep their secret from leaving the mountains.

== Cast ==
- Natalie Burn as Stephanie
- Bryce Draper as Joe
- Eyal Meyer as Charlie
- Ariel Levy as Pablo
- Ignacia Allamand as Magdalena
- Luke Massy as Alpha Hunter
- Andrés Gómez as Skynny Hunter
- Vittorio Farfán as Young Hunter
- Lisseth Candia as Woman Hunter
- Cristian Cuentrejo as Old Hunter
- Elvis Stallone as Biker Hunter
- Matías López as The Stranger
- Priscilla Luciano as Old Woman

== Production ==
The filming began on May 15, 2015 in Chile, and ended in the mid-June. Mixing GoPro footage and stunning cinematography of the mesmerizing Chilean wilderness, Downhill slowly transforms from a sports movie into a body horror tale just as the characters are transformed by something hidden inside them just waiting to burst out…

== Festival awards ==
- Winner: Bloody Work in progress, Blood Window, Ventana Sur (Argentina)
