= Lorenza Izzo =

Chilean actress and model

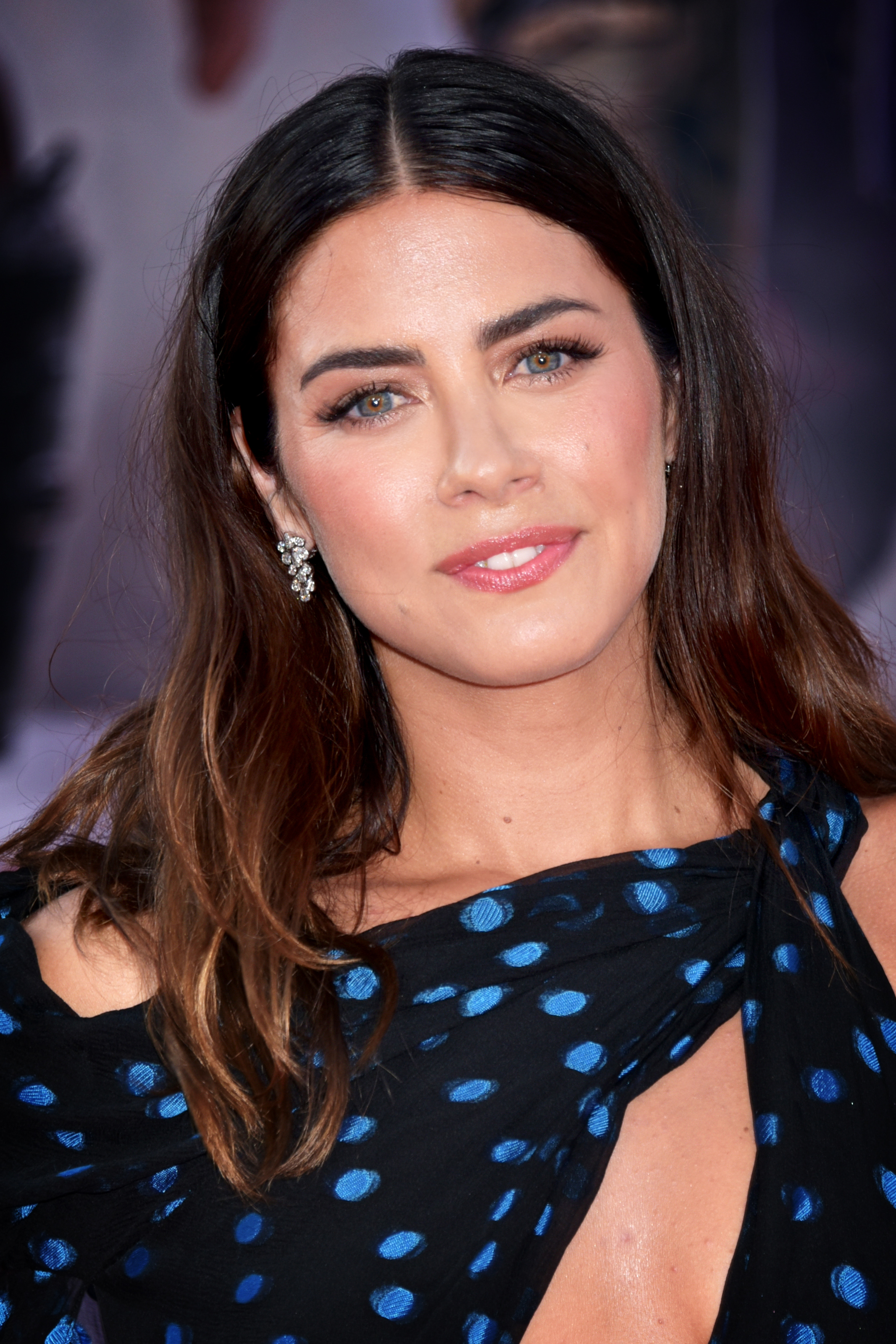
- Izzo in 2019
- Born: Lorenza Francesca Izzo Parsons; September 19, 1989 (age 37); Santiago, Chile
- Education: University of the Andes; Lee Strasberg Institute
- Occupations: Actress; model
- Years active: 2011–present
- Spouse: Eli Roth (m. 2014; div. 2019) Sophie Tabet (m. 2023)

Signature
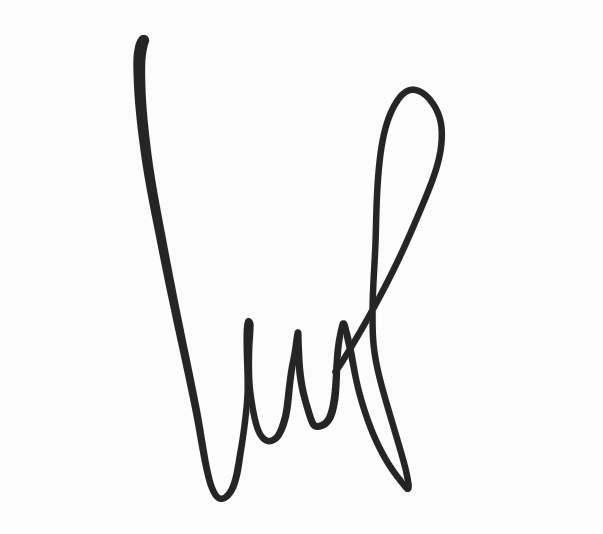

Lorenza Francesca Izzo Parsons (/ləˈrɛnzə ˈɪzoʊ/; Spanish: [loˈɾensa ˈiso]; born September 19, 1989) is a Chilean actress and model. She has appeared in such films as Aftershock (2012), The Green Inferno (2013), Knock Knock (2015), and Quentin Tarantino's Once Upon a Time in Hollywood (2019).

== Early life ==
Izzo was born in Santiago, Chile, to Chilean model Rosita Parsons. She is of Italian descent on her father's side. She has a younger sister, Clara Lyon Parsons, who is also a model. When she was 12, Izzo moved to Atlanta with her father who was working towards a Ph.D. at Georgia Institute of Technology. She was bullied over her strong Chilean accent, but said she "got over [her] accent pretty fast" after watching the 2002 sports film Blue Crush several times. She recalls becoming "obsessed with Blue Crush star Kate Bosworth."

== Career ==
In 2007, Izzo was modeling and studying journalism at the University of the Andes (Universidad de los Andes) when she moved to New York City to study acting at the Lee Strasberg Theatre and Film Institute.

In 2010, she made her acting debut in Instrucciones para mi funeral (Instructions for my Funeral), an independent film made by Sebastián Radic as a graduation project.

Izzo's modeling career reached its peak in 2011 when she and her mother were invited to São Paulo Fashion Week, where they met Gisele Bundchen. It resulted in Izzo becoming the new face of Colcci, a Brazilian fashion company. That year, Izzo appeared in Que pena tu boda (Sorry About Your Wedding) a comedy by Chilean director Nicolás López.

In 2012, with one commercial feature movie to her name and three more about to be released—Que pena tu familia (What a Pity About Your Family), Aftershock, and The Green Inferno (directed by her future husband, now ex-husband, Eli Roth)—Izzo moved to Los Angeles, when she soon secured small roles in Hemlock Grove and the failed television pilot I Am Victor.

In 2015, Izzo starred with Keanu Reeves and Ana de Armas in Knock Knock, her second horror film directed by Eli Roth. It was filmed in Santiago's Chicureo neighbourhood.

In 2019, Izzo starred as the wife (Francesca Capucci) of Leonard DiCaprio's character in the Tarantino film Once Upon a Time in Hollywood. Capucci's character was inspired by Sofia Loren and other 1960s-era Italian sex symbols.

== Personal life ==
On November 8, 2014, Izzo married American actor and director Eli Roth on the beach of Zapallar, Chile. They were introduced by mutual friend and director Nicolás López during the production of 2012's Aftershock. López was unaware Izzo could speak English and she originally had a small role in the film. Roth cast her in the lead when he learned she could speak English fluently and they "spent the whole shooting process together." She attributes the start of their relationship to "the randomness of the world". They filed for divorce in July 2018; it was finalized in August 2019.

Izzo publicly came out as pansexual in an online interview with actress Emily Hampshire for the 2020 Pride Month.

In 2023, Izzo married her girlfriend, writer and director Sophie Tabet.

== Filmography ==
=== Film ===
Year	Title	Role	Notes
2011	Qué pena tu boda	Lucia Edwards	
2012	Qué pena tu familia	Lucia Edwards	
2012	Aftershock	Kylie	
2013	The Green Inferno	Justine	
2014	The Stranger	Ana	
2014	Sex Ed	Pilar	
2015	Knock Knock	Genesis	
2016	Holidays	Jean	
2018	Life Itself	Elena	
2018	The House with a Clock in Its Walls	Mrs. Barnavelt	
2019	Once Upon a Time in Hollywood	Francesca Capucci	
2019	Where We Go from Here	Iris	
2021	Women Is Losers	Celina	
2022	The Aviary	Blair	
2022	Confess, Fletch	Angela	
2025	Stone Cold Fox	Camila	

=== Television ===
Year	Title	Role	Notes
2013	Hemlock Grove	Brooke Bluebell	Guest role; 2 episodes
2013	I Am Victor	Lena Engles	Television film
2016	Feed the Beast	Pilar Herrera	Main role; 10 episodes
2017	Dimension 404	Val Hernandez / SpeedRun	Episode: "Impulse"
2018	Casual	Tathiana	Supporting role; 6 episodes
2020	Penny Dreadful: City of Angels	Santa Muerte	Supporting role; 5 episodes
2021–2025	Hacks	Ruby	8 episodes
2022	Panhandle	Vida Perez Prescott	Main role; 8 episodes
TBA	El Gato	Rosa	Main role; 8 episodes

== Awards and nominations ==
Year	Price	Category	Work	Result
2011	Copihue de Oro	TV model	Herself	Nominated
2014	BloodGuts UK Horror	Best actress	The Green Inferno	Nominated
