= Andrea Velasco =

Chilean actress & singer (born 1981)

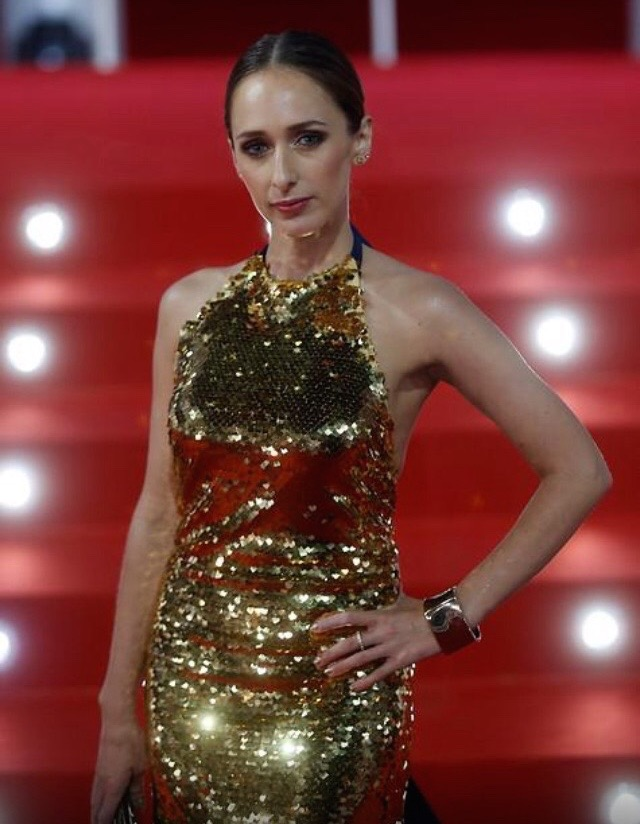
- Born: Andrea María Velasco Alessandri; December 7, 1981 (age 44); Santiago, Chile
- Occupations: Actress, singer & writer
- Years active: 2007–present
- Partner: Pablo Eluchans
- Website: andreavelasco.com

Andrea María Velasco Alessandri (born December 7, 1981, in Santiago, Chile) is a Chilean film, theater and television actress, singer and writer. She is well known for her work in romantic comedies, late night TV shows, and her music and literature career.

== Early life and acting ==
An actress and professional singer, Velasco studied theatrical and musical arts in Chile and Argentina. During her career, she has worked in theatre, TV shows, cinema and radio.

She is best known for her character of Ángela de María in Nicolás López' "Qué Pena" trilogy, "Qué pena tu vida", "Qué pena tu boda" and "Qué pena tu familia", the highest-grossing movies in Chile in 2010, 2011 and 2013, respectively.

In 2011, she was chosen as one of the "100 Young Chilean Leaders" in Culture, an award given by the Strategic Leadership Center from Adolfo Ibáñez University and El Mercurio.

During 2013 she joined TVN's Entertainment department, participating in Solamente Julia with her antagonic role, Isabel Larraín, and then a year after as Denisse Moya in the late night thriller show Vuelve Temprano.

Until 2016, she was an active part of Televisión Nacional de Chile's entertainment department. Now Andrea is based in USA developing her career both in Chile and internationally.

== Music career ==
As a break from her acting career, Velasco recorded her first project as a singer, "Piñata". The 5-song electro-pop EP sung in Spanish was recorded in RedCello Studios in Los Angeles, as a collaboration piece between Velasco, Jorge Costa, Diego Las Heras and Fernando Costa (Red Jesus). "Piñata".

Her first single, titled "De Paseo", was released in December 2014, with a full release in January 2015. That same year, Andrea was nominated as "Best New Artist" for her debut in the Pulsar Chilean Music Awards.

== Other activities ==
Velasco is an active member of Greenpeace, having participated in campaigns to raise awareness about global warming.

She publishes her first book in May 2017 in Santiago de Chile, a contemporary poetry book entitled "Dormancia".

== Filmography ==
=== Movies ===
Year	Movie	Character	Director	Awards
2010	Fuck My Life	Ángela de María (Main Character)	Nicolás López	
2011	Qué pena tu boda	Ángela de María (Main Character)	Nicolás López	Nominated as best actress in a feature film, Altazor Awards 2012, Chile
2013	Qué pena tu familia	Ángela de María (Main Character)	Nicolás López	
2016	Qué pena tu Serie	Ángela de María (Main Character)	Nicolás López	Netflix special edition

Year	Short Film	Character	Director	Awards
2012	Ema	Ema (Main Character)	Jean-Marc Simonneau	
2017	Desde el Principio	Ana (Main Character)	Miguel J. Soliman	Best Actress in a Short Film. The Westfield International Film Festival, New Jersey, USA

=== Soap operas ===
Telenovelas
Year	Show	Role	Channel
2011	Témpano	Isidora Guerrero	TVN
2011	Peleles	Valentina Tagle	Canal 13
2012	La Sexóloga	María José "Coté" Castillo	Chilevisión
2013	Solamente Julia	Isabel Larraín	TVN
2014	Vuelve temprano	Denisse Moya	TVN
2015	Matriarcas	Juliana Flores	TVN

=== TV shows ===
TV shows
Year	Series	Role	Channel	Notes
2007	Casado con hijos	Titi's friend	Mega	
2007	Tres son multitud		Mega	
2008	Aída	Teresa	TVN	
2008	Mi primera vez	Paloma	TVN	Temporada 1, Episodio "Mateo»
2009	Mis años grossos	Coni Bustamante	Chilevisión	Co-protagónico
2009	Teatro en Chilevisión	Adriana	Chilevisión	Episodio "¿Dónde está mi Guaguita?»
2010	La Colonia	Agustina	Mega	
2010	El Lagarto	Macarena	Via X	
2014	Pulseras rojas	Carola	TVN	

== Theatre ==
- Twelfth Night by Shakespeare (2005) as Feste. Santiago, Chile.
- Ubu Roi (2006) by Alfred Jarry, as Mama Ubu. Santiago, Chile.
- The Little Prince (play) (2008) by Antoine de Saint-Exupéry, as "The Little Prince". Santiago, Chile.
- "El Sobre Azul" (2009) writer and director, winner of the National Fund for the Development of Culture and the Arts (FONDART) Santiago, Chile.
- Patio (2011) as Victoria, Compañía de Teatro "La Nuestra", Festival Internacional de Teatro de Providencia (Chile).
- Los Invasores (2012) by Egon Wolff, as Marcela, winner of the National Fund for the Development of Culture and the Arts (FONDART). Santiago, Chile.
- "Verano Verano" by Myrna Casas (2018) as Adriana. Direction by Jorge Merced, production by IATI Theater. New York, USA.

== Music ==
- Lead singer, Contrabando 2005 – 2006
- Lead singer, music and lyrics Pasajeros 2008 – 2009 with Fernando Marín
- Lead singer, Andrea Velasco Cuarteto 2008 – 2010
- Backup singer, Yo Soy Pérez 2009 – 2010
- Lead singer, lyrics and co-production of her first EP, "Piñata" 2015
- Lead singer, lyrics and co-production of her first English single, "Miss América" 2019
- Lead singer, lyrics and co-production of her single, "The Wave" 2020
- Lead singer, lyrics and co-production of her single, "Retornar" 2022

== Discography ==
Studio Albums

- 2015: "Piñata"

Singles

- 2014: "De Paseo"
- 2019: "Miss América"
- 2020: "The Wave"
- 2022: "Retornar"

Collaborations & Remixes

- 2013: "Rey del Kazoo", red jesus
- 2016: "Take your time", Zebra 93
- 2016: "Side by side", Zebra 93
- 2016: "Take your time", Zebra (Virtual Memory Virus Remix)
- 2021: "Go tell it on the mountain", Merry Pinchmas by Pinch Records

== Awards ==
- "Merit Diploma" for her outstanding achievements in Finis Terrae University's Drama School. (2001)
- Winner playwright in the IV Short Playwriting Contest with "Crucidrama" (2003)
- Honorable Mention, XIII National Playwriting Contest with "El Sobre Azul" (2007)
- Winner, National Fund for the Development of Culture and the Arts FONDART (2009)
- Named Leader in Culture among the "100 Young Chilean Leaders" (2011) by Strategic Leadership Center from Adolfo Ibáñez University and El Mercurio.
- Nominated as Best Actress in a Feature Film for her role in "Qué Pena Tu Boda", Altazor Awards (2012)
- Nominated as Best New Artist for her single "De Paseo" from her debut EP "Piñata". Pulsar Chilean Music Awards, (2015)
- Best Comedy Film winner with "Lo Siento Laura" movie, Texas Latin Film Festival (Festival de Cine Latino Americano FDCLA) USA (2016)
- Best Short Film winner with "Desde El Principio" by Miguel J. Soliman. SVA 2017 Short Film Festival, New York, USA. (2017)
- Best Actress in a Short Film winner for her role in "Desde El Principio" by Miguel J. Soliman. The Westfield International Film Festival, New Jersey, USA. (2017)
- Best Short Film winner with "Desde El Principio" by Miguel J. Soliman. HBO NYLFF, HBO New York Latino Film Festival, New York, USA.(2017)
