= Sin Filtro =

Sin Filtro may refer to:

- No Filter (film) a 2016 Chilean film
- A song on Golden (Romeo Santos album)
