= Knock Knock (2015 film) =

2015 thriller film by Eli Roth

- Theatrical release poster
- Directed by: Eli Roth
- Written by: Eli Roth; Guillermo Amoedo; Nicolás López
- Based on: Death Game by Anthony Overman; Michael Ronald Ross
- Produced by: Colleen Camp; Tim Degraye; Cassian Elwes; Eli Roth; Nicolás López; Miguel Asensio Llamas
- Starring: Keanu Reeves; Lorenza Izzo; Ana de Armas; Aaron Burns; Ignacia Allamand; Colleen Camp
- Cinematography: Antonio Quercia
- Edited by: Diego Macho
- Music by: Manuel Riveiro
- Production companies: Voltage Pictures; Dragonfly Entertainment; Sobras International Pictures; Camp Grey Productions; Elevated Films; Black Bear Pictures
- Distributed by: Lionsgate Premiere (United States); Corazón Films (Chile)
- Release dates: January 23, 2015 (Sundance); October 9, 2015 (United States)
- Running time: 99 minutes
- Countries: Chile; United States
- Languages: English; Spanish
- Budget: $10 million
- Box office: $6.3 million

Knock Knock is a 2015 thriller film (Note: Sources differ as to the exact genre of the film; some have classified it as a psychological thriller, an erotic thriller or a dark comedy.) directed by Eli Roth, who also co-wrote the script with Guillermo Amoedo and Nicolás López. The film stars Keanu Reeves, Lorenza Izzo, and Ana de Armas. The film was released on October 9, 2015, by Lionsgate Premiere. Knock Knock is a remake of Death Game (shot in 1974, not released until 1977), which was directed by Peter S. Traynor and starred Sondra Locke and Colleen Camp. All three individuals had a hand in the production of Knock Knock, while Camp also had a cameo in the newer film.

== Plot ==
On Father's Day weekend, architect Evan Webber remains home to complete his work project and attend his physical therapy appointment for his injured shoulder while his wife and children go on a pre-planned vacation. His wife Karen, a successful artist, leaves her assistant Louis in charge of her sculpture that needs to be moved to an art gallery for her show.

Two young women, Genesis and Bel, knock on Evan's door during a rainstorm. Soaking wet, they tell him they are looking for the address of a party but their phones are not working. Evan allows them in to dry off and use the Internet. The girls play with the family dog, Monkey, and flirt with Evan while he orders an Uber for them. As the evening wears on, Genesis and Bel repeatedly push his boundaries, questioning him about fidelity and human nature, getting Evan to dodge them a few times, including when Bel tries to kiss him. The girls disappear to the bathroom when their driver arrives; when Evan brings them their clothes, he finds them naked. He rejects them yet again, trying to convince them to leave, refusing their advances, but they ignore him, seduce him and he has a threesome with them.

The next morning, Evan finds himself stuck with the girls. Both of them act erratic, messy and destructive, and it is apparent that they have no intention of actually leaving the house anymore. Eventually they vandalize Karen's sculpture after Evan tries to force them out, and he threatens to call the police, but they claim they are underage, threatening in turn to have him charged with statutory rape. Vivian, his physical therapist, arrives, but upon meeting Genesis who pretends to be Evan's lover, she angrily leaves. As they continue taunting him and almost push him to his breaking point, Evan finally calls the police and begins to report a break-in. Disconnecting the call, the girls agree to be taken home.

At night, after finishing cleaning the house, Evan is attacked and knocked out by Genesis. He wakes up tied to his bed, and after Bel torments him and both of them threaten to answer one of Karen's facetimes if he doesn't comply, Bel proceeds to climb onto him and rapes him, while Genesis records them with Evan's phone. Evan breaks free and charges at Genesis, but she stabs him right into his operated shoulder with a fork. She and Bel tie Evan to a chair with an electrical cord, torturing him into answering their provoking questions about his infidelity.

Louis arrives for the sculpture and discovers the girls' antics. He tries to free Evan, but has an asthma attack and realizes the girls have taken his inhaler. He slips, lands on the sculpture and hits his head, killing him. The girls turn Louis' corpse into a red sculpture and use both Evan's and Louis' phones to send text messages in order to give the appearance that Evan discovered that Louis and Karen had an affair, vandalized Karen's sculpture in retaliation, and had gotten into a fight with Louis, resulting in Louis' murder. They announce they are planning to kill Evan at dawn as punishment for his infidelity, ignoring Evan's desperate attempt to make them see that it was them who started all of this. They also reveal they have been spying on Evan's family long before the weekend, preparing every detail of their plot.

The girls dig a grave for Evan in the yard and trash the house completely, destroying Karen's art, his architectural designs, and countless other valuable things, including his vinyl collection. Finally they find his home defense gun after smashing a vase, and Genesis takes it, giving Evan a chance to escape if he can hide from them inside the house. Injured and exhausted, Evan fails to outsmart the girls and realizes no one in the neighborhood is at home from whom to ask for help.

At dawn, the girls tie Evan up with a hose, throw him into the grave, leaving only his head above ground, and tell him they will let him live if he confesses everything to his family. Evan tries one last cry for help to no avail, and Genesis proceeds to pick up a large stone to crush his skull with. It misses his head as the girls reveal the entire ordeal was merely a "game". They never intended to kill Evan, nor are underage; everything they did was part of a hobby of seducing, victimizing, and ruining the lives of married men with children, punishing them for having cheated on their spouses, despite the two girls coercing them. Genesis uploads the video she recorded of Bel raping Evan to his Facebook profile, making it public. They depart for another victim and take Monkey with them, leaving Evan to his fate. Karen and the kids arrive to find the house and her art absolutely defaced.

== Cast ==
- Keanu Reeves as Evan Webber
- Lorenza Izzo as Genesis
- Ana de Armas as Bel
- Aaron Burns as Louis
- Ignacia Allamand as Karen Alvarado Webber
- Dan Baily as Jake Webber
- Megan Baily as Lisa Webber
- Colleen Camp as Vivian
- Otto as Monkey

== Production ==
On April 4, 2014, Keanu Reeves was added to the cast to play Evan Webber. Chilean actress Ignacia Allamand also joined the film. The shooting took place in Santiago de Chile. Eli Roth stated that filming in Chile is easier than in the United States. Roth wanted the film to have a comedic approach, with physical humor too.

== Release ==
Knock Knock premiered at the 2015 Sundance Film Festival on January 23, 2015. Three days later, Lionsgate acquired the distribution rights to the film. The film was released in the United States on October 9, 2015.

=== Home media ===
Knock Knock was released on DVD and Blu-ray on December 8, 2015.

=== Critical reception ===
On the review aggregator website Rotten Tomatoes, 37% of 76 critics' reviews are positive, with an average rating of 4.9/10. The website's consensus reads: "Knock Knock brings a lot of talent to bear on its satirical approach to torture horror, but not effectively enough to overcome its repetitive story or misguidedly campy tone." Metacritic, which uses a weighted average, assigned the film a score of 53 out of 100, based on 22 critics, indicating "mixed or average" reviews.

Dread Central awarded it a score of four out of five, saying "what we do have is a home invasion film for the social media generation (yes, it does feature social media in its plot) that should make you think twice before offering warmth and shelter to a stranger on a dark and stormy night."

Jeff Bond of Geek Monthly praised Reeves's performance, saying, "his [dramatic] turn in [the film] ... helps make the movie easily Roth's best work."

== See also ==
- List of films featuring home invasions
