= Fuck My Life (film) =

2010 film

Qué pena tu vida
- Film poster
- Spanish: Qué pena tu vida
- Directed by: Nicolás López
- Written by: Nicolás López
- Produced by: Miguel Asensio
- Starring: Ariel Levy; Lucy Cominetti; Andrea Velasco
- Cinematography: Antonio Quercia
- Edited by: Diego Macho
- Music by: Manuel Rivero
- Release date: 21 October 2010
- Running time: 94 minutes
- Country: Chile
- Language: Spanish

Qué pena tu vida (Spanish: Qué pena tu vida) is a 2010 Chilean comedy film written and directed by Nicolás López. It is the first film in a trilogy that includes Qué pena tu boda (2011) and Qué pena tu familia (2013).

== Plot ==
The film follows the struggles of Javier (Ariel Levy), a 29-year-old advertising professional who loses both his job and his girlfriend, Sofía (Lucy Cominetti). Months later, he attempts to reconcile with her but discovers that she has moved on with someone else. He then begins to see his best friend, Ángela (Andrea Velasco), in a new light and realizes the significance of her presence in his life.

== Cast ==
- Ariel Levy as Javier Fernández
- Lucy Cominetti as Sofía Coccolo
- Andrea Velasco as Ángela de María
- Nicolás Martínez as Walter Gómez
- Carolina de Moras as María del Pilar Lyon.
- Paz Bascuñán as Mariana Vargas.
