= The Green Inferno (film) =

2013 cannibal horror film by Eli Roth

- Theatrical release poster
- Directed by: Eli Roth
- Screenplay by: Eli Roth; Guillermo Amoedo
- Story by: Eli Roth
- Produced by: Eli Roth; Miguel Asensio Llamas; Nicolás López; Christopher Woodrow; Molly Conners
- Starring: Lorenza Izzo; Ariel Levy; Daryl Sabara; Kirby Bliss Blanton; Sky Ferreira; Magda Apanowicz; Nicolás Martinez; Aaron Burns; Ignacia Allamand; Ramón Llao; Richard Burgi
- Cinematography: Antonio Quercia
- Edited by: Ernesto Díaz
- Music by: Manuel Riveiro
- Production companies: Worldview Entertainment; Open Road Films; Dragonfly Entertainment; Sobras International Pictures
- Distributed by: High Top Releasing BH Tilt Universal Pictures (United States); Entertainment One (United Kingdom)
- Release dates: September 8, 2013 (TIFF); September 25, 2015 (United States)
- Running time: 100 minutes
- Countries: United Kingdom; United States
- Language: English
- Budget: $5 million
- Box office: $12.9 million

The Green Inferno is a 2013 cannibal horror film directed by Eli Roth, with a screenplay by Roth and Guillermo Amoedo. It stars Lorenza Izzo, Ariel Levy, Daryl Sabara, Kirby Bliss Blanton, Sky Ferreira, Magda Apanowicz, Nicolás Martinez, Aaron Burns, Ignacia Allamand, Ramón Llao, and Richard Burgi. The film follows a young woman who joins an activist group that goes on an overseas trip, where they eventually run into a cannibalistic tribe.

The movie was inspired by and serves as an homage to Italian cannibal films of the late 1970s and early '80s "cannibal boom", particularly Cannibal Holocaust (1980), which features a film-within-a-film titled The Green Inferno.

The Green Inferno premiered at the 2013 Toronto International Film Festival on September 8, 2013, and was theatrically released on September 25, 2015, by High Top Releasing, BH Tilt, and Universal Pictures. The film received mostly negative reviews from critics but was a moderate commercial success, grossing $12.9 million on a budget of $5 million. The film generated controversy for its depiction of indigenous peoples, with some human rights organizations criticizing the portrayal as promoting racist stereotypes of uncontacted peoples as "savage".

== Plot ==
College freshman Justine becomes interested in a student social activism group led by Alejandro and his girlfriend Kara. The group plans a trip to the Amazon rainforest to stop a petrochemical company from forest clearing and displacing native tribes by filming them and streaming footage to raise awareness. Justine suggests she could bring attention to the issue through her father, a United Nations attorney.

The operation is funded by Carlos, a drug dealer who meets the group in Peru. They journey by boat to the construction site and begin their protest, chaining themselves to bulldozers while filming the land clearing. A private militia hired by the company arrives, and when Justine is nearly killed by an officer, the protest goes viral. The group is arrested, but Carlos bribes the police to release them. They depart by plane, but the plane's engine explodes, and it crashes in the jungle, killing several people, including Carlos.

As the survivors search for a GPS phone, Kara hears something nearby. However, when she goes to check, a native tribe emerges and kills her with an arrow before tranquilizing the others, taking them to their village, and imprisoning them. As a tribal elder and the headhunter leader kill Jonah and feed his remains to their tribe, Alejandro reveals the protest was staged to benefit a rival petrochemical company run by his father so he could focus on other activism projects, to the others' dismay. The tribe tests Justine, Amy, and Samantha for their virginity. Upon learning Justine is a virgin, they take her away for a genital mutilation ceremony while the other two women are returned. Alejandro tells the group to stay put and wait for the next petrochemical company's clearing crews, but they attempt to escape. During a downpour, they distract a watchman while Samantha escapes and hides in a canoe, and Justine is returned but does not remember anything from her ordeal.

The tribe feed the prisoners strange meat. Being a vegan, Amy reluctantly eats, only to discover a chunk of skin in her bowl bearing one of Samantha's tattoos. Realizing they were fed Samantha's remains, Amy breaks the bowl and uses a shard to kill herself. Seeing an opportunity, Lars stuffs marijuana down Amy's throat, hoping to get the tribe high when they eat her. As his plan succeeds, Justine and Daniel escape, but Alejandro, terrified of being caught and killed, chooses to stay, tranquilizing Lars to keep him company. When Lars regains consciousness, the intoxicated tribe members eat him alive.

Justine and Daniel reach the crash site and find a phone but are recaptured and returned to the village. The tribe paints and dresses Justine in tribal attire while an elder ties Daniel to a stake, breaks his limbs, and leaves him to be eaten by ants. News of a forest clearing crew's arrival sends the tribe into a frenzy. The warriors leave to confront them, allowing Justine to escape with the help of a sympathetic child she befriended earlier. Daniel begs Justine to kill him, but the child does so after she refuses. Alejandro begs Justine for help, but she abandons him and flees, even encountering a black jaguar that spares her during the escape. Finding the militia in a battle against the tribe, in which the headhunter and most of the tribe’s warriors are killed, she convinces the militia's leader that she is an American and, despite the militia threatening to kill her, uses the phone to pretend to film the fight so the battle would end peacefully, and they fly her to safety.

In New York City, she lies to her father and other government workers in an interview, saying that she was the sole survivor of the plane crash, the natives were friendly, and that they helped her group before they were slaughtered by the petrochemical company's militia. Sometime later, Justine sees a group of activists wearing shirts emblazoned with Alejandro's face.

In a post-credits scene, Alejandro’s sister Lucia contacts Justine to inform her of a satellite photo which shows Alejandro still alive in the jungle, wearing black tribal paint.

== Cast ==
- Lorenza Izzo as Justine, a college freshman
- Ariel Levy as Alejandro, leader of an activism group
- Daryl Sabara as Lars
- Kirby Bliss Blanton as Amy
- Magda Apanowicz as Samantha
- Sky Ferreira as Kaycee, Justine's roommate
- Nicolás Martínez as Daniel
- Aaron Burns as Jonah
- Ignacia Allamand as Kara, Alejandro's girlfriend
- Ramón Llao as The Bald Headhunter
- Richard Burgi as Charles, Justine's father
- Matías López as Carlos
- Paz Bascuñán as Lucia (voice), Alejandro's supposed sister

== Production ==
On May 17, 2012, at the 2012 Cannes Film Festival, Eli Roth announced that he was planning to direct a horror thriller, The Green Inferno, from Worldview Entertainment stating that they would finance and produce the film. Roth wrote the script with Guillermo Amoedo. Production began in Autumn 2012 in Peru and Chile. In October 2012, it was announced that filming was set to begin in November in Peru. On October 25, Roth announced the full cast for the film. Principal photography began in October 2012 in New York City, and shooting in Peru and in some locations in Chile began on November 5, 2012.

Roth said in an interview in February 2013 that he wanted the film to look like a Werner Herzog or Terrence Malick film. He has also said that he was inspired by Italian cannibal films such as Cannibal Holocaust and Cannibal Ferox.

== Release ==
On July 30, 2013, it was announced that The Green Inferno would premiere at the 2013 Toronto International Film Festival. The film was intended to be released theatrically on September 5, 2014, by Open Road Films. However, Worldview Entertainment caused Open Road to pull it from its original release. The film had secret screenings on September 22, 2013 at Fantastic Fest and on April 25, 2014, at the Stanley Film Festival.

The Green Inferno was eventually theatrically released in the United States on September 25, 2015, by High Top Releasing and BH Tilt. It was released in Filipino theaters on September 23, 2015 by Solar Pictures. Two versions of the film were presented there, depending on the cinema chain: an R-13 "sanitized" version with some gory details removed, resulting in five minutes of footage edited out, and the uncut R-18 version.

== Reception ==
=== Box office ===
The film opened to 1,540 venues, earning $3.5 million in its opening weekend, ranking ninth place in the domestic box office. At the end of this run, six weeks later on November 5, the film grossed $7.2 million in the United States and Canada, and $5.7 million overseas for a worldwide total of $12.9 million.

=== Critical reception ===
On Rotten Tomatoes, the film holds a rating of 39%, based on 99 reviews, with an average rating of 4.9/10. The site's critical consensus reads, "The Green Inferno may not win writer-director Eli Roth many new converts, but fans of his flair for gory spectacle should find it a suitably gruesome diversion." On Metacritic, the film has a score of 38 out of 100, based on 19 critics, indicating "generally unfavorable reviews". CinemaScore audiences gave the film an average grade of "C−" on an A+ to F scale.

The film received a positive response from horror novelist Stephen King, who wrote that the film is "like a glorious throwback to the drive-in movies of my youth: bloody, gripping, hard to watch, but you can't look away." Todd Gilchrist of The Wrap gave the film a negative review, stating "Unfortunately, Roth’s abundant gore fails to either offend or exhilarate." Meredith Borders of Birth. Movies. Death., reporting from Fantasia Fest, gave the film a more positive notice: "The Green Inferno never lets up: it barrels ahead, exuberant and relentless in its brutality, never giving the audience a second to unclench. It's a feast for gorehounds, one with an unsubtle message about the way that uninformed activism harms more than it helps. And it's a total blast."

=== Controversy ===
The film was criticized by Survival International, which campaigns for indigenous peoples and indigenous peoples living in voluntary isolation, as reinforcing colonialism and neocolonialism, as well as their stigmas against indigenous peoples, portraying them as savage. Roth dismissed this argument as unimportant for stopping exploitation: "The idea that a fictional movie about a fictional tribe could somehow hurt indigenous people when gas companies are tearing these villages apart on a daily basis is simply absurd. These companies don't need an excuse—they have one—the natural resources in the ground. They can window-dress things however they like, but nobody will destroy a village because they didn't like a character in a movie, they'll do it because they want to get rich by draining what's under the village. The fear that somehow a movie would give them ammunition to destroy a tribe all sounds like misdirected anger and frustration that the corporations are the ones controlling the fates of these uncontacted tribes."

Before the film's release, the Peruvian Indigenous rights association AIDESEP denounced the film as perpetrating racist and erroneous stereotypes of isolated native tribes. Based on trailers and interviews with Roth, the non-profit organization Amazon Watch accused the film of containing racist imagery and enabling "policies detrimental to the survival of isolated Amazonian indigenous peoples". After its release, the organization denounced the film as racist and inaccurate, criticizing the film for depicting cannibalism and female genital mutilation performed by the natives, despite neither act being practiced in the Amazon. Amazon Watch also accused Roth of falsely claiming on Instagram to an activist that the organization had seen and enjoyed the film. Tara Houska of ICT News criticized the film as promoting the stereotype that "tribes are uncivilized relics from the past", describing the scene in which the natives "fondle the white skin and blonde hair" of the captured activists as promoting the "fear of the "other"." Marxist-Leninist site People's World's writer Albert Bender similarly accused the film of perpetuating racist stereotypes despite the real-world violence perpetrated against Indigenuous people in Brazil, describing it as the "true horror" of the nation. Bender also accused the film of racism by killing off the character Jonah, writing that "He is the first member of the sortie to be killed and eaten... going back to the early days of America cinema, the African American was always the first to “bite the dust...”" (However, the first character to be killed, but not eaten, by the natives is the white character Kara).

As a result of Amazon Watch's criticism, Roth partnered with the website Mongabay and the charity platform Prizeo to launch a fundraising campaign aimed at raising awareness about the Amazon. In a statement, Roth added that "after we screened the film for Mongabay we all agreed that we could use the film’s publicity to help connect fans with them and support the incredible work they’re doing to help the rainforest and protect the people who live there peacefully."

=== Home media ===
The Green Inferno was released on DVD and Blu-ray on January 5, 2016, by Universal Home Entertainment. The release features a director's cut and an audio commentary by Roth, López, Izzo, Burns, Blanton, and Sabara.

== Potential sequel ==
On September 7, 2013, it was announced that a sequel would be produced, titled Beyond the Green Inferno and directed by Nicolás López. As of May 2016, there were no further updates, other than articles referring to the original 2013 announcement and a single unsubstantiated comment, with no production details, that a sequel is still under consideration.
