= No Filter (film) =

2016 Chilean comedy film

- Directed by: Nicolás López
- Written by: Diego Ayala; Nicolás López
- Produced by: Miguel Asensio
- Starring: Paz Bascuñán; Antonio Quercia; Paulo Brunetti; Lucy Cominetti; Ignacia Allamand; Ariel Levy; Alison Mandel; Carolina Paulsen; Ramón Llao; Antonia Zegers; Francisco Ortega
- Cinematography: Antonio Quercia
- Edited by: Diego Macho Gómez
- Music by: Manuel Reveiro
- Release date: 7 January 2016
- Running time: 100 minutes
- Country: Chile
- Language: Spanish

No Filter (Spanish: Sin filtro) is a 2016 Chilean comedy film directed by Nicolás López.

== Plot ==
Pía (Paz Bascuñán) is a 37-year-old modern woman living in bustling Santiago in 2015. Every day, her boss, boyfriend, stepson, and best friend treat her as if she's irrelevant, and she feels powerless to change it. Pía suffers from persistent chest pain that makes it difficult for her to function, and one day, after experiencing intense pain, she decides to undergo an ancient Oriental acupuncture treatment offered by a mysterious Chinese doctor.

Unintentionally, the treatment releases everything Pía has been holding inside and takes her on a journey of personal liberation. Finally, Pía is able to tell people what she truly thinks of them, without any filter, and this helps ease her pain. Over time, however, Pía learns that speaking her mind may not always have positive consequences and can even hurt the people she loves. She must learn to control this new version of herself to move forward with her life.

== Cast ==
- Paz Bascuñán - Pía Vargas
- Antonio Quercia - Antonio
- Paulo Brunetti - Gabriel
- Lucy Cominetti - Javiera
- Ignacia Allamand - Maca
- Ariel Levy - Bastián
- Alison Mandel - Emilia Dimitri
- Carolina Paulsen - Tere
- Ramón Llao - Yi-Ho
- Antonia Zegers - car woman.
- Francisco Ortega - psychiatrist.

== Remakes ==
The movie led to a series of remakes, including: Una mujer sin filtro (Mexico), Empowered (Spain), Super Crazy (Argentina), Sin Pepitas en la Lengua (Panama), Recontraloca (Peru) and Cambio tutto! (Italy).
