= The Stranger (2014 film) =

- Theatrical release poster
- Directed by: Guillermo Amoedo
- Written by: Guillermo Amoedo
- Produced by: Miguel Asensio Llamas; Nicolás López; Eli Roth
- Starring: Cristobal Tapia Montt; Nicolás Durán; Luis Gnecco; Ariel Levy; Alessandra Guerzoni; Lorenza Izzo; Aaron Burns; John Allan; Eric Kleinsteuberg; Pablo Vila
- Cinematography: Chechu Graf
- Edited by: Diego Macho Gómez
- Music by: Manuel Riveiro
- Production companies: Sobras International Films; Highland Film Group
- Distributed by: IFC Midnight
- Release date: September 19, 2014 (Fantastic Fest)
- Running time: 92 minutes
- Country: Chile
- Language: English

The Stranger is a 2014 English-language Chilean horror-thriller film directed by Guillermo Amoedo and starring Cristóbal Tapia Montt, Ariel Levy, Lorenza Izzo and Nicolás Durán. It is the third film from Sobras International Pictures project Chilewood. Montt plays a drifter who enters a small town, seeking information about his estranged wife.

== Plot ==
Martin, a drifter, arrives in a small town in search of a woman named Ana. Peter, a teenager, directs him to a cemetery where Ana is buried. As Martin mourns her death and remembers their past, he is confronted by three thugs led by Caleb, who threaten to kill him. Martin challenges them to do so, but Peter interrupts and tries to stop the attack. However, Caleb stabs Martin and they leave him for dead in a ditch. Peter flags down Lieutenant De Luca, who is revealed to be Caleb's father, and they confront Caleb. Caleb claims self-defense, but De Luca calls him a liar and orders him to cover up the crime. Unbeknownst to them, Peter witnesses everything. After De Luca leaves, Peter finds Martin still alive and brings him home.

Peter convinces his reluctant mother, Monica, to help Martin, but he refuses first aid, claiming his blood is contagious. Martin questions them further about Ana and learns that she committed suicide after giving birth. Martin disappears, and when De Luca returns to bury Martin's body, he finds it missing and suspects Peter. He sends Caleb to deal with the situation, but Caleb beats Peter when he insists he doesn't know Martin's whereabouts. Martin returns and kills Caleb's friends, then sets Caleb on fire. De Luca interrogates Peter, who admits to moving Martin's body, but De Luca initially doesn't believe Martin could have survived his injuries. Nonetheless, he identifies Martin as his son's attacker, and a manhunt begins.

After becoming drunk, De Luca encounters Peter again and takes him to a secluded spot. There, De Luca continues the interrogation and sets Peter on fire when he continues to insist he knows nothing about Martin. After knocking De Luca unconscious, Martin rescues Peter and takes him back to Monica's house. As she calls an ambulance, Martin recites a Latin blessing and rubs his blood on Peter. Later, at the hospital, Peter miraculously recovers and is discharged. As Monica and Peter flee the town, the police capture Martin. De Luca stops the bus Peter and Monica have boarded, abducts them, and forces them to reveal how Peter was healed. He makes Monica, a nurse, perform a transfusion from Martin to Caleb. Martin begs her not to do so and insists that his blood must be blessed to prevent infection, but De Luca ignores him.

Although Caleb is healed by Martin's blood, he becomes infected and kills Monica before leaving the hospital with his father. The police go to De Luca's house to question him, but he refuses to come out. They assault the house. Peter goes to the jail to free Martin but finds out that Martin is unable to revive the dead. Nonetheless, Martin demands that they stop Caleb. When Martin arrives at De Luca's house, he finds De Luca and Caleb missing, and all the police officers, except the chief of police, are dead. Martin kills the wounded chief of police, revealing that he has also become infected. They race after Caleb, and De Luca rams their car. In the resulting accident, Peter becomes wounded and accidentally infects himself when he comes into contact with Martin's blood. Martin ties him to a tree and leaves him. In the encounter, De Luca is killed.

A passing motorist with a pet dog frees Peter. Martin finds and confronts Caleb, but he is overpowered by Caleb, who has killed and fed off a young girl. Peter arrives, his face bloody and dirty from feeding, and drags Caleb into the sunlight, protected by heavy clothing. Caleb disintegrates upon exposure to the sun. Martin then reveals to Peter that he and Ana are Peter's true parents, and that Monica adopted him after Ana's suicide. Martin tells Peter to be stronger than his mother and requests that Peter leave him to die in the sun. As Peter departs, it is revealed that he fed off the motorist's pet dog, whom he lets out of her car. He then drives away.

== Cast ==
- Cristobal Tapia Montt as Martin
- Nicolás Durán as Peter
- Lorenza Izzo as Ana
- Luis Gnecco as Lieutenant De Luca
- Ariel Levy as Caleb
- Alessandra Guerzoni as Monica
- Aaron Burns as Officer Harris
- John Allan as Police Chief
- Eric Kleinsteuber as Caleb's Friend
- Sally Rose as Nurse Sonia
- Pablo Vila as Doctor Hill
- Manuel Márquez as Jack

== Production ==
Filming took place in Chile and included financing from the Chilean government.

== Release ==
In September 2014, The Stranger was premiered at the 2014 Fantastic Fest Film Festival. In January 2015 IFC Midnight acquired the distribution rights for the United States.

== Reception ==
The Stranger won the "Best Iberoamerican Film" Award on Sitges Film Festival. Rotten Tomatoes, a review aggregator, reports that 27% of 11 surveyed critics gave the film a positive review; the average is 4/10. Metacritic rated it 32/100 based on six reviews. Frank Scheck of The Hollywood Reporter called it a "lifeless, fang-less vampire movie" that avoids traditional cliches but descends into uninteresting melodrama. Maitland McDonagh of Film Journal International wrote that it will appeal to neither Twilight fans nor hardcore horror fans, but it is "admirably eerie and remarkably restrained". Andy Webster of The New York Times questioned whether the film's unoriginal violence has a moral but praised the film's acting and direction. Robert Abele of the Los Angeles Times wrote that it "comes across like an amateur play at gravitas, one unsupported by dully weighted scenes and clunky dialogue". Patrick Cooper of Bloody Disgusting rated it 1/5 stars and called it an "utterly forgettable" film that fails to grab audiences. Drew Tinnin of Dread Central rated it 2.5/5 stars and wrote that the film "is filled with so much desperation that it can't help but be depressing even with some uplifting themes about sacrifice and family bonds".

== See also ==
- Cinema of Chile
