= Vuelve temprano (Chilean TV series) =

- Genre: Thriller
- Created by: Daniella Castagno
- Written by: Raúl Gutiérrez; Paula Parra; Felipe Rojas; Alejandro Bruna
- Directed by: Víctor Huerta González; Rodrigo Meneses L.
- Creative director: Alex Bowen
- Starring: Amparo Noguera; Francisco Reyes Morandé; Francisco Melo; Marcelo Alonso; Matías Assler; Patricia Rivadeneira; Matías Oviedo; Viviana Rodríguez; Santiago Tupper; Andrea Velasco
- Country of origin: Chile
- Original language: Spanish
- No. of episodes: 118

Production
- Executive producer: Eduardo Alegría Celaya
- Producer: Marcelo Martínez U.
- Editor: César Soto L.

Original release
- Network: TVN
- Release: January 6 – August 4, 2014

Related
- Socias; No Abras la Puerta

Vuelve temprano (English: Come back early) is a 2014 Chilean telenovela produced and broadcast by TVN.

== Cast ==
- Amparo Noguera as Clara Arancibia
- Francisco Reyes Morandé as Santiago Goycolea - Villain Principal
- Francisco Melo as Antonio Fuenzalida - Villain (†)
- Marcelo Alonso as Francisco Valenzuela
- Andrés Velasco as Padre Miguel Goycolea (†)
- Matías Oviedo as Manuel Carvacho
- Patricia Rivadeneira as Maite Soler
- Viviana Rodríguez as Renata Arancibia - Villain
- Claudia Pérez as Fiscal Loreto Rodríguez (†)
- Santiago Tupper as Hans Troncoso - Villain
- Andrea Velasco as Denisse Moya
- Matías Assler as Ignacio Goycolea (†)
- Pedro Campos as Gabriel Castro
- Josefina Fiebelkorn as Isidora Goycolea
- Jorge Arecheta as Pablo Valenzuela
- Fernanda Ramírez as Florencia Goycolea
- Constanza Contreras as Catalina Echeñique - Villain

=== Special participations ===
- Stavros Mosjos as Claudio Menéses
- Catalina Vera as Ingrid Parra
- Natalia Riveros as Fanny Rebolledo
- Rommy Salinas as Sofia Herrera
- Juan José Gurruchaga as Felipe Zabela
- Trinidad González as Norma Castro - Villain (†)
- Remigio Remedy as Diego Manzur
- Carlo Bravo as Alfredo Salgado - Villain (†)
- Mireya Sotoconil as Graciela Muñoz (†)
- Gabrio Cavallo as Mario
- Felipe Pinto as Detective Astorga (†)
