= Emmanuel Orenday =

Mexican actor (born 1984)

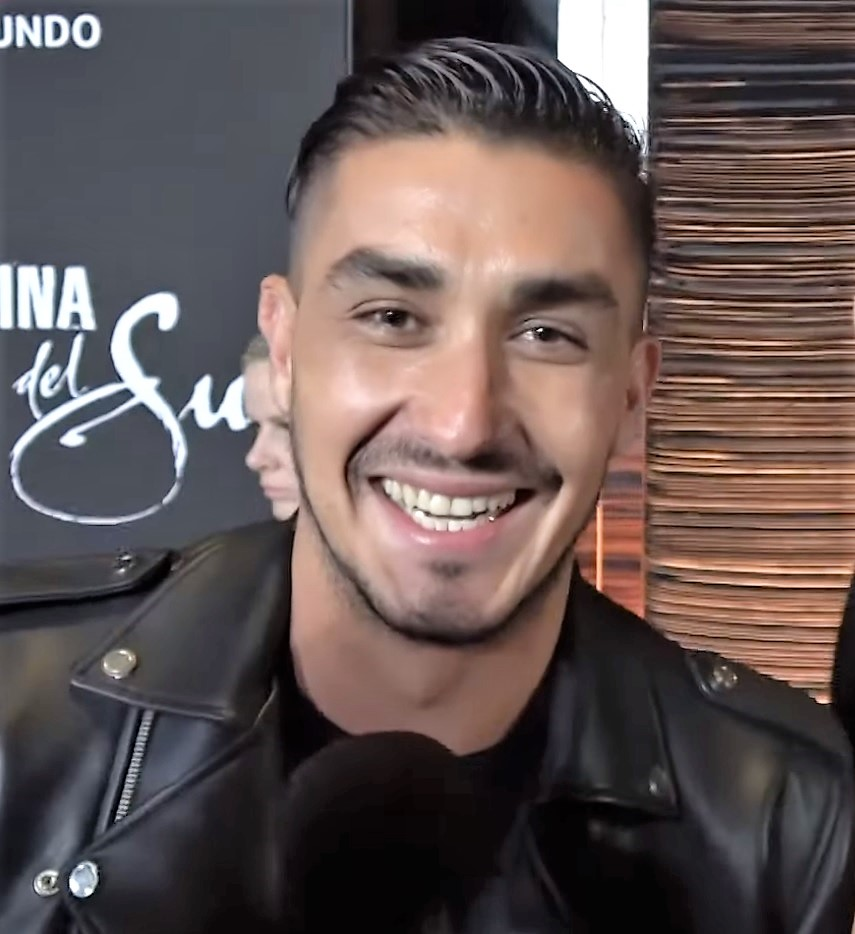
- Orenday interviewed by Dulce Osuna in 2019
- Born: Emmanuel Orenday Franco; 19 May 1984 (age 41); Aguascalientes, Mexico
- Occupation: Actor
- Years active: 2004–present

Emmanuel Orenday Franco (born 19 May 1984) is a Mexican actor. Born in Aguascalientes, Mexico. He is most recognised for his portrayal of Paulino Prieto, the co-lead character on the Televisa telenovela Sin tu mirada. His first major role was in the Telemundo series El Señor de los Cielos.

== Filmography ==
Film roles
Year	Title	Roles	Notes
2010	Borrar de la memoria	Zurdo	
2013	Reflexión	Manuel	Short film
2018	Sacúdete las penas	Pepe González "Frituras"	

Television roles
Year	Title	Roles	Notes
2004	Soñarás	Unknown role	
2004	La vida es una canción	Unknown role	Episode: "Mírame a los ojos"
2004–2005	Los Sánchez	Isaac	Recurring role
2008–2012	La rosa de Guadalupe	Various roles	Recurring role; 30 episodes
2009	Mujeres asesinas	DIEM	Recurring role (season 29); 6 episodes
2010–2011	Para volver a amar	Dylan	Recurring role; 108 episodes
2011–2012	Esperanza del corazón	Brandon Figueroa Guzmán	Recurring role; 144 episodes
2011–2012	Como dice el dicho	Various roles	Recurring role (seasons 1–2); 2 episodes
2013	Niñas mal	León Mora	Recurring role
2013–2014	El Señor de los Cielos	Gregorio Ponte	Recurring role (seasons 1–2); 65 episodes
2015–2016	Señora Acero	Horacio Quiroga	Recurring role (season 2); 38 episodes
2017–2018	Sin tu mirada	Paulino Prieto	Series regular; 111 episodes
2019–2023	La Reina del Sur	Danilo Márquez	Series regular (seasons 2–3); 68 episodes
2020	Operación pacífico	Guerrero	
