= Recontraloca =

- Theatrical release poster
- Directed by: Giovanni Ciccia
- Written by: Nicolás López
- Produced by: Miguel Asensio Llamas; Giovanni Ciccia; Carlos Hansen; Doménica Seminario; Gustavo Sánchez; Katherine Villar
- Starring: Gianella Neyra
- Cinematography: Mario Bassino
- Edited by: Diego Macho Gómez
- Music by: Manuel Riveiro
- Production companies: La Soga Producciones; Tiki Pictures; BF Perú
- Release date: August 8, 2019
- Running time: 90 minutes
- Country: Peru
- Language: Spanish

Recontraloca (lit. 'Very, very crazy') is a 2019 Peruvian comedy film directed by Giovanni Ciccia (in his directorial debut) and written by Nicolás López. It is a remake of the 2016 Chilean film No Filter. Starring Gianella Neyra. It was released on August 8, 2019, in Peruvian theaters.

== Synopsis ==
Adriana, a 38-year-old woman is overwhelmed by the mistreatment of her boss, her husband, her stepson, her competition at work, among other people with whom she relates to a daily basis. Until one day, desperate, she visits a strange healer. Outcome? She does and says everything she never thought she would, without filters, which will lead to hilarious situations.

== Cast ==
The actors participating in this film are:

- Gianella Neyra as Adriana
- Rebeca Escribens as Mrs. Auto
- Paul Vega as Antonio
- Santiago Suárez as Nicolás
- Chiara Pinasco as Maria Paz
- Nicolás Galindo as Sebastian
- Rossana Fernández Maldonado as Dani
- Franco Cabrera as Neighbour
- Giovanni Ciccia as Gabriel
- Alessandra Fuller as Teffi

== Reception ==
Recontraloca was seen by more than 104,000 people in its first weekend. Within a month of its release, the film was seen by more than 500,000 people.
