= Mi pequeño gran hombre =

- Directed by: Jorge Ramírez Suárez
- Story by: Marcos Carnevale
- Based on: Corazón de león by Marcos Carnevale
- Starring: Jorge Salinas; Fernanda Castillo
- Cinematography: Ricardo Garfias
- Edited by: Adriana Martínez
- Music by: Yamil Rezc
- Release date: 7 December 2018 (Mexico)
- Country: Mexico
- Language: Spanish

Mi pequeño gran hombre (lit. 'My little big man') is a 2018 Mexican comedy film directed by Jorge Ramírez Suárez. The film premiered on 7 December 2018, and it stars Jorge Salinas and Fernanda Castillo. It is an adaptation of the Argentine film Corazón de león directed by Marcos Carnevale. The plot revolves around the life of a successful lawyer, divorced, who knows a charming and charismatic man, although there is a detail with which he finds it difficult to deal: his small stature. The film has a budget of just over 4 million pesos, which was granted by the Comisión de Filmaciones del Estado de Jalisco. It was filmed in Guadalajara, Jalisco (including Bar El Callejón de los Rumberos), the Centro Histórico de la Ciudad de México, and beaches in Paseo Chapultepec.

== Cast ==
- Jorge Salinas as León Godoy
- Fernanda Castillo as Carla
- José Carriedo as Diego
- André Real as Fabio
- Silvia Pasquel as Adriana
- Arleth Terán as Corina
