= Sacúdete las penas =

- Directed by: Andres Ibañez Diaz Infante
- Written by: Alejandro Díaz San Vicente
- Starring: Emmanuel Orenday; Melissa Barrera
- Narrated by: Gustavo Sánchez Parra
- Cinematography: Erwin Jaquez
- Edited by: Óscar Figueroa
- Music by: Camilo Lara; Sergio Mendoza
- Production company: Bh5
- Release date: 27 April 2018 (Mexico)
- Country: Mexico
- Language: Spanish

Sacúdete las penas (lit. 'Shake Off Your Sorrows') is a 2018 Mexican musical drama film written and directed by Andrés Ibáñez Díaz Infante. The film premiered on 27 April 2018 in Mexico, and is stars Emmanuel Orenday, and Melissa Barrera.

== Plot ==
González, a prisoner with a long sentence, tells the story of Frituras, the most famous dancer in Mexico City. On a night of revelry, Frituras would lose his freedom, ending at the Palacio de Lecumberri, the most dangerous prison in the country.

== Cast ==
- Emmanuel Orenday as Pepe González "Frituras"
- Melissa Barrera as Luisa
- Gustavo Sánchez Parra as González
- Arturo Barba as García
- Alejandro Calva as Martín del Campo
- Fernanda Castillo as María
- Begoña Narváez as Eva
- Roberto Sosa as Chávez

== Production ==
The film was filmed mostly at the San Luis Potosí Arts Center.
