= Santos (film) =

- Directed by: Nicolás López
- Written by: Nicolás López
- Produced by: José Manuel Lorenzo; Eduardo Campoy
- Starring: Javier Gutiérrez; Elsa Pataky; Leonardo Sbaraglia; Guillermo Toledo
- Cinematography: Chechu Graf
- Edited by: Diego Macho
- Music by: Manuel Riveiro
- Production companies: Boomerang Cine; Telecinco Cinema; Sobras Producciones
- Distributed by: Buena Vista International (es)
- Release dates: 20 September 2008 (FantasticFest); 10 October 2008 (Spain); 18 December 2008 (Chile)
- Countries: Spain; Chile
- Language: Spanish
- Budget: $6 million
- Box office: $147,090

Santos is a 2008 Spanish-Chilean comedy film directed and written by Nicolás López which stars Javier Gutiérrez, Elsa Pataky, Leonardo Sbaraglia, and Guillermo Toledo. Billed as a "romantic comedy about the end of the world", it is López's sophomore feature after Promedio rojo. Boasting a budget of around $6 million, it turned out to be a "monumental bust".

== Plot ==
An interdimensional traveller known as Antropomosco discloses to comic book artist Salvador Santos the real identity of the latter's friend Arturo Antares as that of the supervillain Nova. Santos undergoes the hero's journey to rescue love interest Laura Luna from Nova's grip.

== Cast ==
- Javier Gutiérrez as Salvador Santos
- Guillermo Toledo as Antropomosco
- Leonardo Sbaraglia as Arturo Antares / Nova
- Elsa Pataky as Laura Luna

== Production ==
Santos is a Boomerang Cine, Telecinco Cinema and Sobras Producciones production. José Manuel Lorenzo and Eduardo Campoy were credited as producers. The film boasted a reported budget of around $6 million. Shooting locations included Santiago, Madrid, and Tokyo.

== Release ==
The film made its world premiere at the Austin-based Fantastic Fest on 20 September 2008. It also screened in competition at the Sitges Film Festival on 4 October 2008. Distributed by Buena Vista, it was theatrically released in Spain on 10 October 2008. It opened in Chile on 18 December 2008.

== Reception ==
Alberto Luchini of El Mundo rated the film 1 out of 5 stars, considering that it brings an "interesting visual proposal", on top of "a story that borders on the embarrassing", featuring "a frankly unpleasant preadolescent and scatological sense of humor", with jokes that are not only unfunny, but "repugnant" too.

Jordi Costa of El País wrote that [with the film] "it seems that Nicolás López places his omnivorous voracity of popular culture references at the service of a kind of unbridled and (self-)caricatured autobiography".

Acknowledging the failure of the film (in the wake of devastating reviews and underwhelming box-office numbers), Nicolás López deemed the reception to be "a blow to [his] ego".

== See also ==
- List of Chilean films
- List of Spanish films of 2008
