= Ignacia Allamand =

Chilean actress (born 1981)

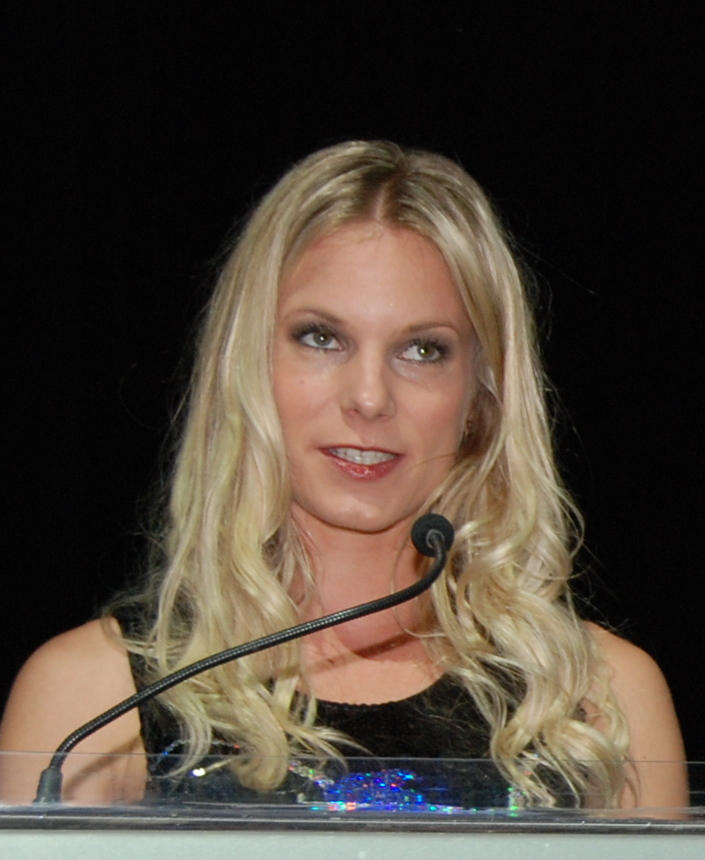
- Born: María Ignacia Allamand Lyon; August 29, 1981 (age 44); Santiago, Chile
- Occupation: Actress
- Years active: 2005–present
- Known for: Knock Knock, The Green Inferno, Aftershock
- Spouse: Tiago Correa (2010–2011)
- Awards: Premio APES (2008); Best supporting actress – Vivir con 10

María Ignacia Allamand Lyon (born August 29, 1981) is a Chilean film and television actress.

== Personal life ==
Allamand was born in Santiago, Chile. She is the daughter of the former Chilean defense minister and presidential candidate Andrés Allamand Zavala. Her mother is Bárbara Lyon, best known for her work with "Fundación Alter Ego". Due to her father's work, she spent part of her teenage years living in Washington D.C., United States. Back in Chile, she studied acting at the School of Theater at the Pontificia Universidad Católica de Chile (Catholic University of Chile). Later, she would also study acting in Buenos Aires, Argentina.

In 2010, she married Chilean actor Tiago Correa but the couple separated a year later. In 2013, Allamand took part in her father's presidential campaign.

== Career ==
In 2005, Allamand made her first appearance in a film in Alberto Fuguet's film Se arrienda alongside Luciano Cruz-Coke. She became well known in Chile for her role as Eloísa Solé in Vivir con 10, a Chilevisión serial drama "Telenovela". She is also the brand ambassador for the Chilean retail chain París.

Allamand would later appear in the Nicolás López trilogy "Qué pena tu vida" (2010), "Qué pena tu boda" (2011) and "Qué pena tu familia" (2013).

Her international film career began in 2013 with Aftershock, a Nicolás López film inspired by the 2010 earthquake in Concepción, Chile. The film was produced by Eli Roth, with whom she worked again on the 2013 horror film The Green Inferno and Knock Knock in 2015.

== Filmography ==
=== Films ===
Year	Title	Role	Director	Awards
2005	Se arrienda	Cordelia	Alberto Fuguet	
2008	Cordero de Dios	María Paz (1978)	Lucía Cedrón	
2010	Qué pena tu vida	Úrsula Brunner	Nicolás López	
2011	Qué pena tu boda	Úrsula Brunner	Nicolás López	
2012	Aftershock	Guide	Nicolás López	
2013	Qué pena tu familia	Úrsula Brunner	Nicolás López	
2013	Mis peores amigos: Promedio Rojo, el regreso	Ejecutive	Nicolás López	
2013	The Green Inferno	Kara	Eli Roth	
2015	Knock Knock	Karen Alvarado	Eli Roth	
2016	Downhill	Magdalena	Patricio Valladares	
2017	Do it Like an Hombre	Luciana	Nicolás López	
2018	No estoy loca	Isidora	Nicolás López	
2022	S.O.S. Mamis: La película	María Gracia	Gabriela Sobarzo	
2023	S.O.S. Mamis 2: Mosquita muerta	María Gracia	Gabriela Sobarzo	

== Television ==
=== TV series ===
Teleserie
Year	TV Drama	Role
2007	Vivir con 10	Eloisa Sole
2008	Mala Conducta	Martina Bobadilla
2010	Mujeres de Lujo	Lietta Meyer
2010	Cartas de Mujer	Consuelo
2011	Infiltradas	Nina Engel
2012	Cobre	Veronica Blake
2012	El reemplazante	Rosario
2012	Separados	Josefa Matte
2014	Volver a Amar	Olivia Thompson
2014	Modern Family	Gay's friend

=== TV shows ===
- es:Juga2 (TVN, 2013)
- es:Zona de Estrellas (Zona Latina, 2013)
- Vértigo (Canal 13, 2013)
- Más vale tarde (Mega,2014)
- es:El Descapotable (Via X,2014)

== Advertising ==
- Almacenes París – Brand ambassador
