= Ya veremos =

- Theatrical release poster
- Directed by: Pedro Pablo Ibarra
- Written by: Alberto Bremer
- Produced by: Jacobo Nazar; Rodrigo Trujillo
- Starring: Mauricio Ochmann; Fernanda Castillo; Emiliano Aramayo
- Cinematography: Martin Boege
- Edited by: Eduardo Guillen; Diego Macho Gomez; Julio Hernandez
- Music by: Manuel Riveiro
- Production company: Trompo Studios
- Distributed by: Pantelion Films
- Release date: August 2, 2018
- Running time: 97 minutes
- Country: Mexico
- Language: Spanish
- Box office: $14.1 million

Ya veremos is a 2018 Mexican comedy-drama film directed by Pedro Pablo Ibarra, and written by Alberto Bremer. The film stars Mauricio Ochmann, Fernanda Castillo, and Emiliano Aramayo. The film was released nationally in Mexico by Videocine on 2 August 2018.

Distributed by Pantelion Films, it was released in the United States on 31 August 2018. Despite being panned by critics, the film was a major box office success, debuting at the top of the Mexico box office, reaching a first four-day weekend gross of MX$73 million pesos, the second-best all-time opening weekend for a Mexican film after Instructions Not Included.

== Plot ==
Santi is a child in Mexico City who has had to deal with the separation of his parents, Rodrigo and Alejandra. They are required to meet once in a while, as they share their child's time. Santi is spending a few weeks with Rodrigo as his mom goes on a trip with her new boyfriend, the nephew of the third richest man in Mexico.

Rodrigo is a nursery doctor who must regularly be at the hospital to assist with births at the expense of his family (and this is what caused Alejandra to divorce him). At the hospital he asks Santi to fetch a cup of water for one of his patients. When Santi fails to identify the water jug in his peripheral vision, Rodrigo deduces he has vision problems. After getting his eyes checked it is clear he is losing his eyesight due to juvenile glaucoma. His eye doctor friend says there is a surgery that can mitigate the problems and restore his eyesight but that it has a 50/50 chance of success, and could leave Santi permanently blind if it fails.

Santi makes a wish list of everything he wants to do and everywhere he wants to go and asks to fulfill it together with his two parents, before the operation. Meanwhile, a former one-night-stand named Irma who has been stalking Rodrigo for many months shows up at his door, distracting him. Rodrigo chases Alejandro's car, breaks into his private airplane hangar and catches their attention just before takeoff. They let him on their airplane and Rodrigo explains what is happening. Her fiancée agrees to let Alejandra accompany him on their trip (though sleeping in separate rooms).

The list contains numerous things which Alejandra has discouraged Santi from or guarded him against, such as going to a live wrestling match, watching horror movies, swimming with sharks, jet-skiing and seeing a naked woman. Also, he wants to take them on a trip to Acapulco, where his parents got engaged. Additionally, Santi takes eye drops to improve his vision before the surgery which takes place within two weeks.

Most of the items on the list are accomplished without great difficulty. Alejandra purchases several crates of carrots from local supermarkets and frequently mixes them into juices and omelets with the thought that it will improve Santi's eyesight. The next time Irma shows up at their front door, Rodrigo lures her into his bathroom where she takes a shower. Santi instead walks in on her, fulfilling his wish, although she trashes their house as she runs out.

Next up is the trip to Acapulco. Rodrigo and Alejandra realize they still connect with each other very well, listening to the same music as they did during their engagement trip. At a restaurant, Rodrigo remembers a long list of foods which Alejandra was allergic to (which Alejandra's new boyfriend couldn't be bothered to remember), and they share a kiss. Early the next morning, with weakening eyesight, Santi goes outside to a dangerous observation point, and his parents work together to find him (he was testing their resolve).

Eventually they return to the hospital where Rodrigo works and the operation is performed on Santi. While they wait, Rodrigo expresses to Alejandra and her boyfriend that he still loves her and wishes to remain together for the sake of their son. They both return to his hospital room. His vision is blurry, but eventually resolves to see both of them standing there for him.

== Cast ==
- Mauricio Ochmann as Rodrigo
- Fernanda Castillo as Alejandra
- Emiliano Aramayo as Santi
- Estefania Ahumada as Irma
- Erik Hayser
- Jorge Caballero
- Camila Ibarra

== Reception ==
=== Box office ===
As of 2 September 2018, Ya Veremos has grossed $2.2 million in the United States and Canada, and $10 million in other territories, for a total worldwide gross of $12.2 million.

The film was released in Mexico on 2 August 2018, and finished at the top of the box office, reaching a first four-day weekend gross of 73 million Mexican Pesos ($3.3 million), the second-best all-time opening weekend for a Mexican film after Instructions Not Included.

In its opening weekend in the US the film made $1.8 million in its opening weekend (including $2.2 million over the four-day Labor Day weekend) from 369 theaters.

=== Critical response ===
The film received lukewarm reception by critics. On review aggregator Rotten Tomatoes, the film holds an approval rating of 0% based on 10 reviews with an average rating of 4.8/10. On Metacritic, the film has a weighted average score of 25 out of 100, based on 4 critics, indicating "generally unfavorable reviews".

Writing for The Hollywood Reporter, Frank Scheck criticized the "juvenile humor and ersatz emotion" and wrote, "The film might have proved tolerable, barely, if the two adult leads had any spark of chemistry, but such is not the case. Ochmann attempts to bring boyish charm to his performance but merely comes across as immature, while Castillo goes overboard in the other direction with her stiffness. We never come to care whether their characters get back together, which is the kiss of death in a romantic comedy."

== See also ==
- List of highest-grossing Mexican films
