= Cosas de amigos =

- Theatrical release poster
- Directed by: Giovanni Ciccia
- Written by: Guillermo Amoedo
- Produced by: Miguel Asensio Llamas; Gustavo Sánchez
- Starring: Rodrigo Sánchez Patiño; Bruno Ascenzo; Óscar López Arias; Gisela Ponce de León; Emilia Drago; Miguel Dávalos
- Cinematography: Mario Bassino
- Edited by: Diego Macho Gómez
- Music by: Manuel Riveiro
- Production companies: La Soga Producciones; Tiki Pictures
- Release date: July 21, 2022
- Running time: 103 minutes
- Country: Peru
- Language: Spanish

Cosas de amigos (lit. 'Friends stuff') is a 2022 Peruvian comedy film directed by Giovanni Ciccia and written by Guillermo Amoedo. It stars Rodrigo Sánchez Patiño, Bruno Ascenzo, Óscar López Arias, Gisela Ponce de León, Emilia Drago and Miguel Dávalos. It premiered on July 21, 2022. The film is a remake of the Mexican film Do It Like an Hombre.

== Synopsis ==
Raúl, Eduardo and Santiago have been friends since childhood and have had a happy and “masculine” life, until Santi confesses that he is gay and decides to separate from his girlfriend, Raúl's sister. Raúl can't stand the idea and tries to convince his friend by all means that his is nothing more than a mistake.

== Cast ==
The actors participating in this film are:

- Rodrigo Sánchez Patiño as Raúl
- Bruno Ascenzo as Santiago
- Óscar López Arias as Eduardo
- Gisela Ponce de León as Natalia
- Emilia Drago as Luciana
- Miguel Dávalos as José
- Juan Ignacio di Marco as Julián Dolán
- Gianfranco Brero as Psychiatrist
- Renzo Schuller as Miki Johnsons

== Reception ==
The film had its commercial release on July 21, 2022, but had its official preview on July 15, 16, and 17 of the same year.
