= Empowered (film) =

- Poster
- Spanish: Sin rodeos
- Directed by: Santiago Segura
- Screenplay by: Benigno López; Marta González de Vega; Santiago Segura
- Based on: No Filter by Diego Ayala & Nicolás López
- Produced by: Mercedes Gamero; María Luisa Gutiérrez; Santiago Segura
- Starring: Maribel Verdú; Diego Martín; Toni Acosta; Rafael Spregelburd; Bárbara Santa Cruz; Cristina Castaño; Cristina Pedroche; David Guapo; Quique San Francisco; Florentino Fernández; El Gran Wyoming; Candela Peña; Santiago Segura
- Cinematography: Kiko de la Rica
- Edited by: Fran Amaro
- Music by: Roque Baños; Tessy Díez
- Production companies: Bowfinger International Pictures S.L.; Sin Filtro la película AIE; Atresmedia Cine
- Distributed by: A Contracorriente Films
- Release date: 2 March 2018
- Country: Spain
- Language: Spanish
- Budget: €3,894,000

Empowered (Spanish: Sin rodeos) is a 2018 Spanish comedy film directed by Santiago Segura which consists of a remake of the 2016 Chilean film No Filter (Sin filtro). The cast is led by Maribel Verdú.

== Plot ==
At a first glace everything seems to click in Paz's life. However, deep down, she has a serious problem: she cannot express her emotions to others, causing her much distress. She goes to a shamanic doctor, who prescribes her a potion. The effect of the potion is that Paz begins to express absolutely everything she is thinking about, without beating around the bush.

== Cast ==
- Maribel Verdú as Paz.
- Diego Martín as Gabriel.
- Toni Acosta as Bea.
- Rafael Spregelburd as Dante.
- Bárbara Santa Cruz as Alejandra.
- Cristina Castaño as Vanessa.
- Cristina Pedroche as Alicia.
- David Guapo as Borja.
- Quique San Francisco as Kiko.
- Florentino Fernández
- El Gran Wyoming
- Candela Peña
- Santiago Segura as Amil Narayan.
- Abigail Frías
- Paco Collado
- Alaska
- Mario Vaquerizo
- José Mota
- Daniela Blume
- Fernando Gil
- Daniel Medina

== Production ==
Empowered was written by Benigno López, Marta González de Vega and Santiago Segura, adapting the original screenplay of No Filter by Diego Ayala and Nicolás López. The film was produced by Bowfinger International Pictures S.L. alongside Sin Filtro la película AIE and Atresmedia Cine, with the participation of Movistar+. The budget was valued at €3,894,000, receiving a help from the ICAA of €1,277,543. Shooting took place in different locations of the Madrid region, lasting for seven weeks. The score was composed by Roque Baños and Tessy Díez, whereas Kiko de la Rica worked as cinematographer.

== Release ==
Distributed by A Contracorriente Films, Empowered was theatrically released in Spain on 2 March 2018, scoring the biggest movie opening weekend for any Spanish domestic release in 2018 (to that date).

== Reception ==
Reviewing for Fotogramas, Juan Pando scored the film with 3 out of 5 stars, highlighting the "fun" ending credits, whereas he otherwise missed some of the Santiago Segura's trademark "irreverent" humour, which appears "blurred" in the film.

Andrea G. Bermejo of Cinemanía rate it with 3½ out of 5 stars, considering that the film turned out to be a precise portrait of how bad the state of things is.

Quim Casas of El Periódico de Catalunya gave the film 2 out of 5 stars, considering that Segura takes it to his territory, mixing some bite with the simplest comicality.

On review aggregator website Rotten Tomatoes, the film holds an approval rating of 67% based on 6 reviews, with an average rating of 5.0/10.

== See also ==
- List of Spanish films of 2018
