= Women Is Losers =

2021 drama film by Lissette Feliciano

Women is Losers
- Film poster
- Directed by: Lissette Feliciano
- Written by: Lissette Feliciano
- Produced by: Lissette Feliciano, David Ortiz
- Starring: Lorenza Izzo; Bryan Craig; Chrissie Fit; Simu Liu; Steven Bauer; Liza Weil; Cranston Johnson; Alejandra Miranda; Shalim Ortiz; Lincoln Bonilla
- Cinematography: Farhad Ahmed Dehlvi
- Edited by: John-Michael Powell
- Music by: Frederik Wiedmann
- Production company: Look at the Moon Pictures
- Distributed by: HBO Max
- Release dates: March 16, 2021 (SXSW); October 25, 2021
- Running time: 84 minutes
- Country: United States
- Language: English

Women Is Losers is a 2021 American drama film written and directed by Lissette Feliciano. Starring Lorenza Izzo, Bryan Craig, Chrissie Fit, Simu Liu, Steven Bauer, Liza Weil, Cranston Johnson, Alejandra Miranda, Shalim Ortiz and Lincoln Bonilla, it follows the life of a young woman from her formative years to adulthood in 1960s San Francisco. The film's title is derived from a Janis Joplin song.

The film premiered at South by Southwest on March 16, 2021, and was released on October 25, 2021, on HBO Max.

== Plot ==
In 1967 San Francisco, Celina Guerrera is a studious teenager who attends a Catholic high school and is from a conservative immigrant family. When the course of her life is altered by an unplanned pregnancy, she sets out to rise above poverty and invest in a future for herself.

== Cast ==
- Lorenza Izzo as Celina
- Bryan Craig as Mateo
- Chrissie Fit as Marty
- Simu Liu as Gilbert
- Steven Bauer as Don Juan
- Liza Weil as Minerva
- Cranston Johnson as Calvin
- Alejandra Miranda as Dona Carolina
- Shalim Ortiz as Carlos
- Lincoln Bonilla as Christian

== Production ==
In February 2019, Deadline Hollywood announced Lorenza Izzo would star in the feminist indie drama written and directed by Lissette Feliciano in her feature directorial debut.

In March 2019, it was announced that Bryan Craig had joined the cast, and The Hollywood Reporter announced that Liza Weil and Simu Liu had joined. The film was shot on location in San Francisco.

Ghalib Datta served as one of the executive producers on the film.

== Release ==
The film premiered at South by Southwest on March 16, 2021. In September 2021, HBO Max acquired distribution rights and set it for an October 25, 2021 release.

== Reception ==
Women Is Losers holds a 72% approval rating on the review aggregator website Rotten Tomatoes, whose consensus reads: "While it might have benefited from a subtler approach to its message, Women Is Losers is elevated by outstanding work from lead Lorenza Izzo."

Kate Erbland of IndieWire gave the film a B−, writing Women Is Losers "is an infectious and auspicious debut…surely the start of something wonderful for [Lissette] Feliciano". Variety also praised Izzo's performance, with critic Tomris Laffly saying: "Izzo delivers a vibrant performance that reinforces her fascinating acting range…It’s a rewarding experience to watch Izzo thread a tricky line with ease here, emitting both a childlike innocence and gradual steeliness that slowly yet convincingly sharpens and matures".

=== Accolades ===
The film won multiple accolades on the film festival circuit, including the Audience Award at the 2021 Mill Valley Film Festival, the Richard D. Propes Social Impact Award for Narrative Feature at the 2021 Heartland International Film Festival, and the Best Narrative Feature Award at the 2021 Columbus International Film & Animation Festival. In addition, it won the awards for Best First Time Director at the 2021 San Diego International Film Festival and Bay Area Filmmaker at the 2021 Sonoma International Film Festival.
