= Aftershock (2012 film) =

2012 Chilean-American film by Nicolás López

- US theatrical release poster
- Directed by: Nicolás López
- Screenplay by: Nicolás López; Eli Roth; Guillermo Amoedo
- Story by: Nicolás López; Eli Roth
- Produced by: Eli Roth; Brian Oliver; Miguel Asensio
- Starring: Eli Roth; Andrea Osvárt; Ariel Levy; Natasha Yarovenko; Nicolas Martinez; Lorenza Izzo
- Cinematography: Antonio Quercia
- Edited by: Diego Macho Gómez
- Music by: Manuel Riveiro
- Production companies: Cross Creek Pictures; Dragonfly Entertainment
- Distributed by: Dimension Films; RADiUS-TWC (United States); Walt Disney Studios Motion Pictures (Chile)
- Release dates: September 11, 2012 (TIFF); May 10, 2013 (United States)
- Running time: 89 minutes
- Countries: United States; Chile
- Language: English
- Budget: $2 million
- Box office: $294,696

Aftershock is a 2012 disaster horror film directed by Nicolás López and was written by López, Eli Roth, and Guillermo Amoedo, from a story by Roth and López. The film stars Roth, Andrea Osvárt, Ariel Levy, Natasha Yarovenko, Nicolas Martinez, and Lorenza Izzo as a group of travelers who are in an underground nightclub in Chile when a massive earthquake hits and quickly learn that reaching the surface is just the beginning of their nightmare.

An American and Chilean co-production, Aftershock had premiered at the TIFF on September 11, 2012, and was theatrically released in the United States on May 10, 2013, by Dimension Films and RADiUS-TWC. The film grossed only $294,696 and received generally mixed-to-negative reviews from critics, who criticized its depiction of the 2010 8.8 earthquake in Chile as well as its writing, characters and plot.

== Plot ==
Gringo, Ariel, and Pollo meet Hungarian sisters Monica and Kylie and their Russian friend Irina at a club in Chile. They decide to travel together to Valparaíso but during a party at another club, an earthquake strikes, trapping them under debris. Ariel loses his hand trying to help a trapped bartender, and they struggle to escape until a cleaning lady guides them through a tunnel to a manhole. Unfortunately, a passing truck kills the old lady as they try to climb out.

After escaping the club, the group finds their car destroyed and Ariel's condition worsens due to blood loss. They decide to get him to a hospital on top of the hill. As they rush to the cable tram station, a tsunami warning is heard. The owner agrees to let only Ariel board the tram car, but a frayed cable breaks, causing the car to plummet to the bottom of the hill, killing everyone on board.

The group heads towards the cemetery through a hidden tunnel after Ariel's tragic death. Along the way, they encounter escaped prisoners looting on the streets. Trying to escape, Gringo gets trapped under a falling building while Monica and Pollo leave to find help. They come across an out-of-control firetruck that crashed due to prisoners attempting to take it over. Monica and Pollo save the living firefighter trapped inside.

While Irina comforts Gringo, Kylie overhears approaching prisoners. Gringo tells the women to hide, but the prisoners threaten him for their location. Irina is captured and raped by the leader while the others sit around joking. Gringo tries to stop the leader and is burned alive in retaliation. Kylie runs away and bumps into Monica and the group, who go back for Irina. Pollo kills the leader's brother, but as they try to escape, the leader returns and kills Irina.

The group finds a gated building with other survivors but a single mother initially refuses to let them in. As they beg, the woman shoots Pollo in the chest. They hide him and go to get help, but one of the prisoners hears Pollo's phone ringing and finds him. They kill Pollo and pursue the others.

The group reaches the cathedral, and the priest saves them by leading them through a secret passage. The cathedral collapses during an aftershock, killing the priest and injuring Kylie. The firefighter who helps Kylie is revealed to be one of the escaped prisoners. Monica finds Kylie's body while the prisoner tries to kill her, but she manages to kill him with an axe during another aftershock.

Monica finally manages to escape through the tunnel and reaches a beach, but she passes out. When she regains consciousness, she looks behind and sees a massive tsunami barreling towards her.

== Cast ==
- Eli Roth as Gringo
- Andrea Osvárt as Monica
- Ariel Levy as Ariel
- Natasha Yarovenko as Irina
- Nicolás Martínez as Pollo
- Lorenza Izzo as Kylie
- Marcial Tagle as Firefighter
- Ramón Llao as Ramon
- Ignacia Allamand as Guide
- Paz Bascuñán as Pregnant woman
- Matías López as Marito
- Patricio Strahovsky as Priest
- Álvaro López as Jesus
- Dayana Amigo as Bartender
- Eduardo Domínguez as Russell Dazzle
- Gabriela Hernández as Cleaning lady
- Edgardo Bruna as Grumpy operator
- Selena Gomez as VIP Girl
- Cristina Pascual as Kindly woman

== Production ==
The film is directed by Nicolás López and written by López, Eli Roth, and Guillermo Amoedo, from a story by Roth and López. The film was based on true events from the 2010 8.8 earthquake in Chile. It was shot in Chile, in many of the same locations where the destruction took place. The idea came from a conversation with Roth and López in which López described the horrors of not just the earthquake, but the complete chaos and temporary collapse of society in the ensuing hours. The film is distributed by Dimension Films.

Roth raised $2 million in funding from a group of doctors in Buffalo. Distribution rights were presold to recoup the budget costs.

López had previous experience shooting using Digital SLR cameras, and after screen tests, convinced Roth that with the right lenses and lighting it would look like 35mm film. The entire movie was recorded using a Canon EOS 5D camera.

== Release ==
The film initially received a NC-17 rating, and consequently had to be re-edited so that it would achieve an R rating.

== Reception ==
=== Critical response ===
Rotten Tomatoes gives Aftershock a 42% approval rating based on 53 reviews, with an average score of 4.80/10. The site's consensus reads: "Aftershock hints at an inventive twist on horror tropes, but ultimately settles for another round of mind-numbing depravity that may alternately bore and revolt all but the most ardent gore enthusiasts". Metacritic gives a 39 rating, indicating "generally unfavorable" reviews, based on reviews from 20 critics.

=== Box office ===
The film opened at 110 theatres in the United States, and earned $40,179 in its opening weekend.

== See also ==
- Earthquake (1974)
- 2010 Chile earthquake
