= Guillermo Amoedo =

Uruguayan director and screenwriter (born 1983)

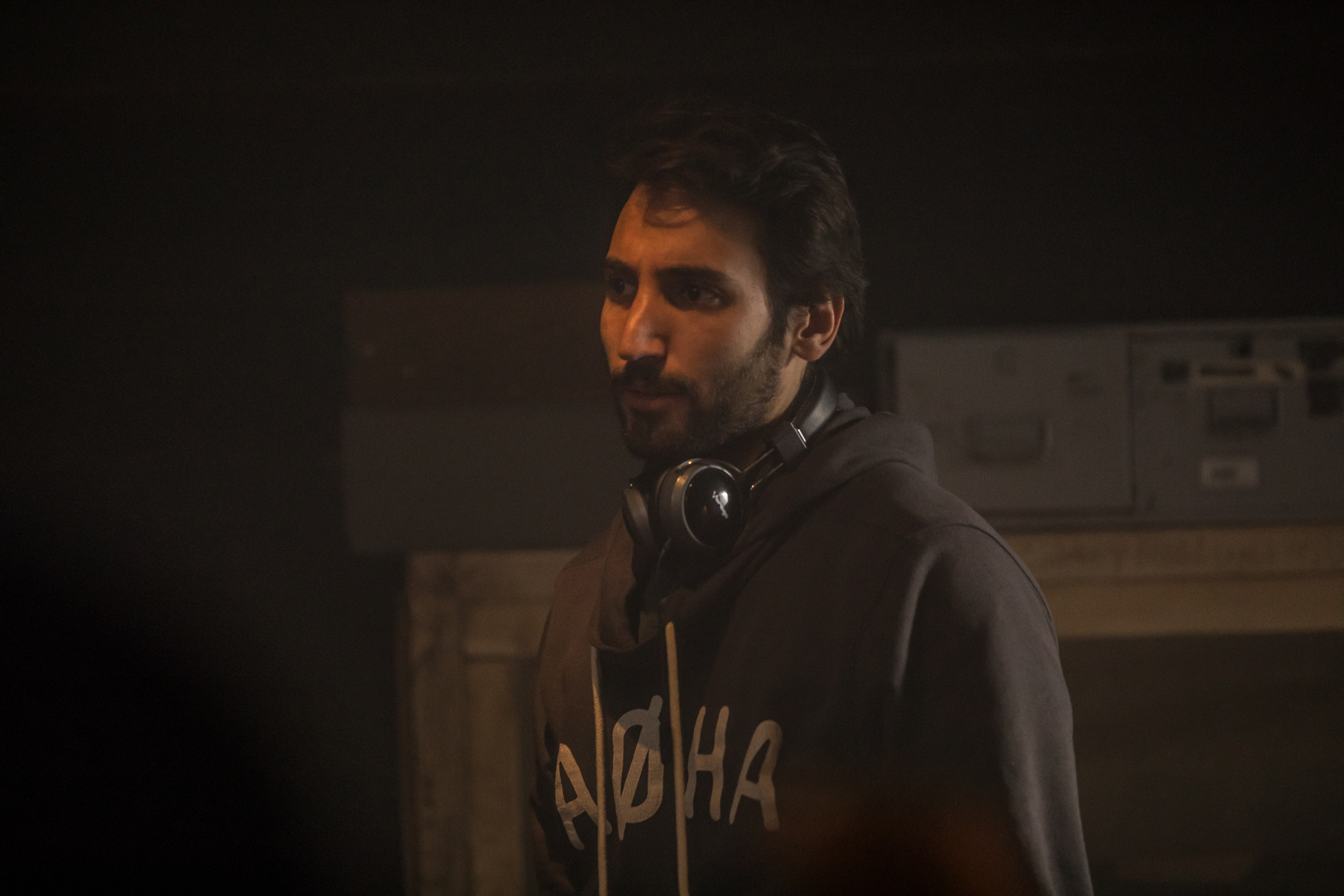
- Amoedo on the set of the movie El Habitante
- Born: Guillermo Amoedo Schultze; March 2, 1983 (age 43); Montevideo, Uruguay
- Occupations: Film director, screenwriter, film producer, film editor
- Years active: 2003 – present

Guillermo Amoedo Schultze (born 2 March 1983 in Montevideo) is a Uruguayan director and screenwriter, working in Santiago, Chile since 2007.

Amoedo is the cowriter, with Nicolás López, of the films Que Pena Tu Vida (2010), Que Pena Tu Boda (2011), Que Pena Tu Familia (2012), Mis Peores Amigos (2013) and, with Eli Roth, of the films Aftershock (2012), The Green Inferno (2013) and Knock Knock (2015).

He has also written and directed the TV films El Crack (2011), La Leyenda de El Crack (2015) and the feature films Retorno (2010) and The Stranger (2014).

Amoedo received a Bachelor of Communication at the University of Montevideo and later graduated as a Master in Screenwriting at the Universidad de los Andes, where he now teaches practice writing classes.

== Filmography ==
=== Feature films ===
Year	Title	Director	Writer	Notes
2009	Retorno	Yes	Yes	Also editor and executive producer
2011	Qué pena tu boda	No	Yes	
2012	Qué pena tu familia	No	Yes	
2013	The Green Inferno	No	Yes	
2013	Mis Peores Amigos: Promedio Rojo el regreso	No	Yes	
2014	The Stranger	Yes	Yes	Also associate producer
2015	Knock, Knock	No	Yes	
2017	Hazlo Como Hombre	No	Yes	
2017	The Inhabitant	Yes	Yes	
2018	No Estoy Loca	No	Yes	
2019	Dulce Familia	No	Yes	
2022	Me Vuelves Loca	No	Yes	

=== Short films ===
Year	Title	Director	Writer	Notes
2003	Memorias	Yes	Yes	
2004	Tercera Persona	Yes	Yes	Also editor
2005	La Escafandra	Yes	Yes	Also executuce producer
2006	El Último Globo	Yes	Yes	Also cinematographer
2013	The Fourth Houseman	Yes	Yes	

=== Television ===
Year	Title	Director	Writer	Notes
2011	El Crack	Yes	Yes	TV movie Co-directed with Nicolás López
2012	Que Pena Tu Serie	No	Yes	TV series 12 episodes
2015	La Leyenda de El Crack	Yes	Yes	TV movie
2019	Tu Parte del Trato	No	Yes	TV series 8 episodes

=== Webseries ===
Year	Title	Director	Writer	Notes
2011	El Crack	Yes	Yes	Co-directed with Nicolás López
2013	Se Venden	No	Yes	
2016	Hola Sandra	No	Yes	

== Awards ==
Sitges - Catalan International Film Festival
Won, Blood Window Award to the Best Iberoamerican Film, "The Stranger" (2014)
Nominated, Grand Prize of European Fantasy Film in Silver, Official Fantàstic Panorama Selection, "Mis peores amigos: Promedio rojo el regreso" (2013)
