= Antonio Quercia =

Chilean cinematographer

Antonio Quercia is a Chilean cinematographer. He is best known for his work on The Green Inferno and Knock Knock.

== Filmography ==
Feature films

- Aftershock (2012)
- The Green Inferno (2013)
- Knock Knock (2015)
- No Filter (2016)
