= Ariel Levy (actor) =

Chilean actor, professional wrestler and singer

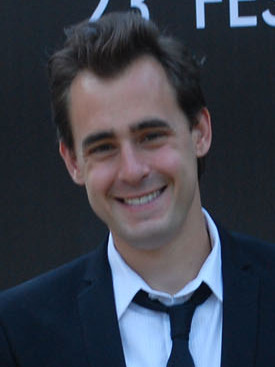
- Born: 28 September 1984 (age 41); Santiago, Chile
- Occupations: Actor, wrestler
- Years active: 2004–present

Ariel Levy Dor (born 28 September 1984) is a Chilean actor and professional wrestler. He is best known for playing Javier Fernández, the main character in the Nicolás López comic film trilogy Qué pena tu..., Ariel in Aftershock and Alejandro in The Green Inferno.

In parallel to his career as an actor, Ariel started in 2015 a career as a professional wrestler in his native Chile, becoming one of the main faces of CNL Chile, one of the biggest wrestling promotions in the country, and even becoming the CNL National Champion. In 2018, Levy announced that he was chosen for the first WWE South American Tryout, to be held in Santiago, Chile.

== Acting career ==
Levy made his debut as a film actor in the film "Promedio Rojo" ("Below Average" in English releases) directed by Nicolás López, in 2004. he played Roberto Rodríguez. In 2007, he acted in the short film "Súper niño bully" also directed by Nicolás López.

In addition, he has acted on television, making his debut in the television series "EsCool" playing "Matías Jarpa" and participating mainly in youth series such as "Porky te amo", by Mega, "Vivir con 10" by Chilevisión, among others. In 2012, he performed for the first time in a nocturnal television series, in "La sexóloga".

On the other hand, since 2007, Levy has been part of the garage rock band Don Nadie, where he is voice and guitar, along with Andrés Larraín (drums), Matías Vega (bass and choruses) and Fernando Wurmann (guitar and choirs). ) .2 3 In 2009, the band released an album with ten songs.4

Since 2010, Levy has acted in the trilogy of director Nicolás López, "Qué pena tu vida", "Qué pena tu boda" and "Qué pena tu familia", which also made a series broadcast on Netflix called "Qué pena tu serie".

Levy has been part of the international films Aftershock and The Green Inferno, the latter directed by director Eli Roth.

In the year 2017, he began his career in Mexico with films like "Hazlo como hombre".

== Professional wrestling career ==
He began his career in Lucha Libre in 2015, debuting at the Chilean company "National Wrestling Championship" (CNL), which offered training and fight in events transmitted by various Internet platforms. On 3 August 2016, he called himself CNL Hollywood International Champion, thus holding the unofficial CNL championship. On 30 August, he was involved in a live fight during a radio broadcast; however, it was part of an advertising campaign for a CNL event. After several opportunities, on 30 September 2018, he becomes for the first time National Wrestling Champion CNL, winning the most important championship of that company. In the recordings for CNL Manía, broadcast on 7 December 2019, Ariel became for the second time a National Wrestling Champion CNL.

Since 2015, Ariel has fought in various companies of Lucha Libre in Chile, among these, are "5 Luchas Clandestino", "Acción Sin Límites", "Fénix Lucha Libre Chile", "Impacto Iquique", "Xtreme Club Lucha Libre", "Fight Chile" and "Wrestling Superstars". Ariel, won for the first time an official championship of a wrestling company, on 26 January 2018, winning the "Wrestling Superstar Tag Team Championship" of the company. Ariel has also been twice champion in Xtreme Club Lucha Libre, obtaining a championship that changes the name of the person who carries it, calling itself during the reign of Ariel, Xtreme Club Hollywood Championship. On 10 August 2019, Ariel becomes FNX Champion, bearing the most important title of the company.

On 25 October, the company CNL, announced that Ariel Levy had been selected among the 45 selected from all Latin America to participate in the first Tryout of Latin Americans of the WWE, which would take place from 2 to 4 December in Santiago. Due to an injury, he could not participate in the physical tests, but confirmed that he did in the other tests and once recovered he would participate in the missing ones. On 7 December, Ariel on his Instagram account reported that he was participating in a new WWE Tryout in Florida, USA. On 19 July 2020, he participated in a WWE special on YouTube, making the preview of the WWE Extreme Rules PPV with other wrestler and commentators of the company. On 27 September of the same year, he was again in the WWE preview, for the WWE Clash of Champions PPV. He reappears in a WWE pre-show, for the WWE Wrestlemania Backlash event. On 21 May 2021, it is confirmed that Ariel was again in a WWE Tryout in Florida, United States

In November 2020, Levy began his tour of the United States, debuting for Coastal Championship Wrestling (CCW) with a victory. He has also wrestled in NAWA Wrestling and AEW Dark. On 17 January 2021, Levy became a champion in the United States for the first time by winning the CCW Tag Team Championship.

=== Championships and accomplishments ===
- Campeonato Nacional de Lucha Libre
  - Campeonato Nacional de CNL (2 times)
- Coastal Championship Wrestling
  - CCW World Championship (1 time)
  - CCW Southeastern Heavyweight Championship (1 time, current)
  - CCW Tag Team Championship (1 time) – with Vinicious as The South American Alliance
  - International Open Challenge World Championship (1 time)
- Fénix Lucha Libre
  - Campeonato de FNX (1 time)
- Sandwiches & Lucha Show
  - Torneo en Equipos (2018) – with Kristy
- Wrestling Superstar
  - Campeonato en Parejas de Wrestling Superstar (1 time) – with Connor
- Xtreme Club Lucha Libre
  - Campeonato Hollywood de Xtreme Club (2 times)

== Filmography ==
Film
Year	Title	Role	Notes
2004	Promedio Rojo	Roberto Rodríguez	
2005	Se Arrienda	David	
2007	Super niño bully	Benito	
2009	La vaca atada	Benjamín	
2010	Mitos y Leyendas: La Nueva Alianza ´	Julian	
2010	Fuck My Life	Javier Fernández	
2011	Marcelo, La Mafia y La Estafa	Marcelo Gambardella	
2011	Que pena tu boda	Javier Fernández	
2012	Aftershock	Ariel	
2012	Que pena tu familia	Javier Fernández	
2014	The Green Inferno	Alejandro	
2013	Mis Peores Amigos: Promedio Rojo, El Regreso	Roberto Rodríguez	
2013	Se Venden	Ivan	TV movie
2014	Loco Cielo de Abril	Bruno	
2014	The Stranger	Caled	
2014	Fuerzas Especiales	Comisario Carboni	
2014	Blood Sugar Baby	Billy	
2015	Fuerzas Especiales 2: Cabos Sueltos	Comisario Carboni	
2015	La leyenda de el Crack	Freddy 'Fantasía' Monquiel	
2015	Exorcistas	Ariel	
2016	Sin Filtro	Bastián	
2017	Hazlo como hombre	Julian	
2018	No estoy loca	Alejandro	
2018	American Huaso		
2019	En las buenas y en las malas	Alonso	
2019	Dulce familia	Presentador	
2020	Cosas de hombres	José	
2021	El mesero	Samuel	
2024	All of it Ends	Samuel Ricci	

Television
Year	Title	Role	Notes
2005	EsCool	Matias Jarpa	TV series
2005	Mitú	Gustavo Canales «El niño rayo»	TV series
2006	Porky te Amo	Clemente Goycolea	TV series (1 episode)
2006	JPT: Justicia para todos	Dead Young	TV series (1 episode)
2007	Casado con Hijos	Vicente	TV series (1 episode)
2007	Vivir con 10	Gaspar Solé	TV series
2008	Mala conducta	Pablo 'Carpa' Parra	TV series (7 episodes)
2009	Sin anestesia	Matías Errázuriz	TV series
2009–2014	Teatro en CHV	Nico / Brandon	TV series (5 episodes)
2009	Mis años gloriosos	Lucas	TV miniseries
2010	Adiós al séptimo de línea	Teniente Arce	TV miniseries
2011	Vampiras	Mingi 2.0	TV series
2011	Infiltradas	Cristóbal Espejo	TV series (47 episodes)
2011	12 Días	Juan ´	TV miniseries (2 episodes)
2011	La colonia	Carnicero Mondaca	TV miniseries
2011	El crack	Freddy «Fantasía» Monquiel	TV miniseries
2012	Amar y morir en Chile	Joaquín	TV miniseries
2012	Soltera Otra Vez	Exequiel Echeverría	TV series (3 episodes)
2012–2013	La Sexóloga	Adamo Curilén	TV series (84 episodes)
2016	20añero a los 40	Oliver Grez	TV series
2020–2021	AEW Dark	Himself	TV series (2 episodes)
2020–2021	CCW Alive Wrestling	Himself	TV series (4 episodes)
2025	AEW: WrestleDream	Himself	TV special
