= Nicolás López (director) =

Chilean filmmaker

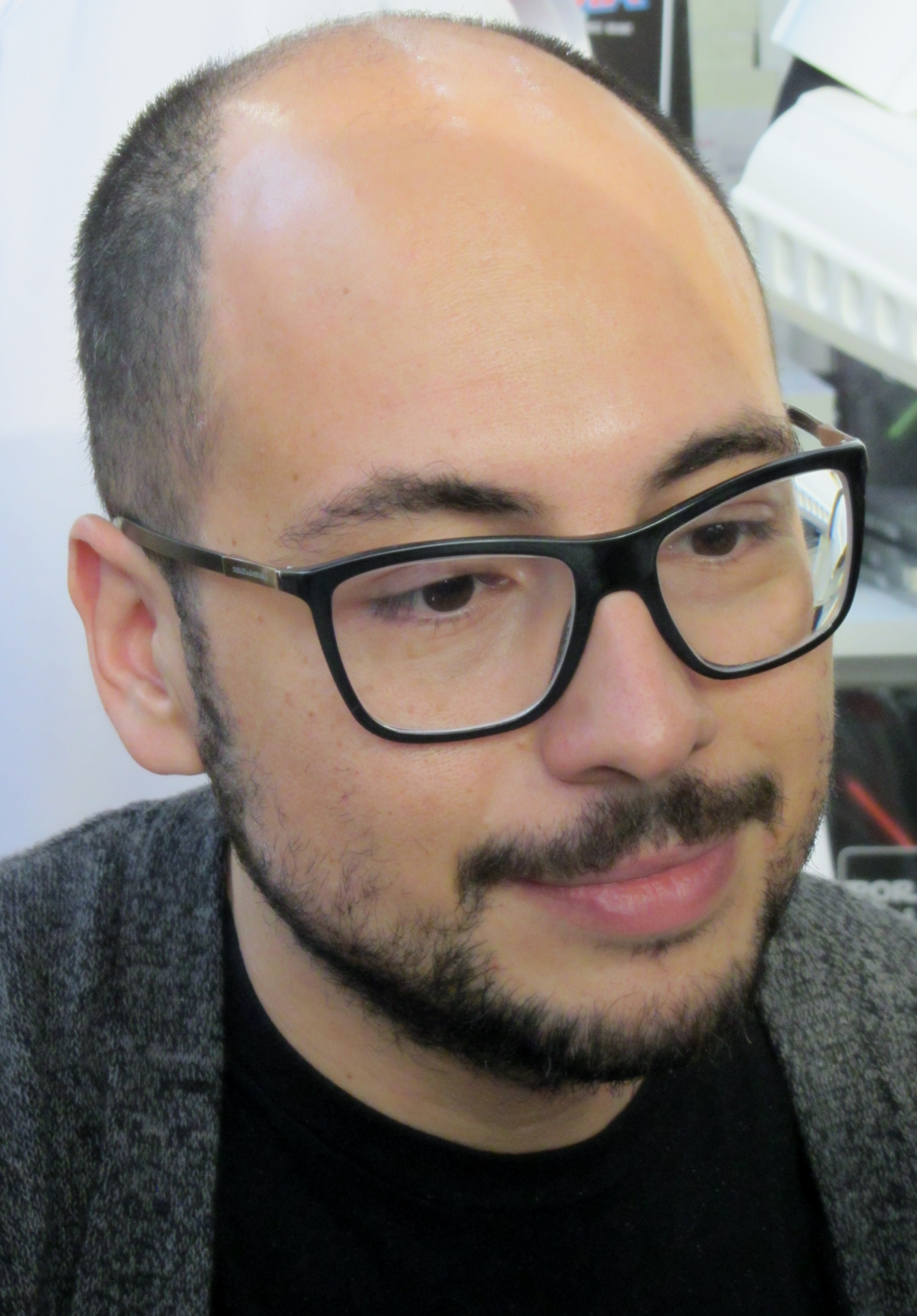
- López in 2015
- Born: 16 March 1983 (age 43); Santiago, Chile
- Occupations: Film director, screenwriter, producer
- Website: sobras.com

Nicolás Javier López Fernández (born 16 March 1983) is a Chilean film director screenwriter and producer. He is known for comedies such as Promedio Rojo (2004), the Qué pena trilogy (2010–2012), and the Paz Bascuñán vehicles Sin filtro (2016) and No estoy loca (2018).

== Life and work ==
López became interested in filmmaking at a young age. After reading Rebel Without a Crew (1995) by Robert Rodriguez and watching Clerks (1994) by Kevin Smith, he began experimenting with his family's video camera. By the age of 12, he was already writing a column for El Mercurio. His column, Memorias de un Pingüino ("Memories of a Penguin"), ran from 1997 to 1999. Following his expulsion from school, he began writing a new column titled López.

At the age of 15, López made his debut at the Valdivia Film Festival with his first short film Pajero.

At age 20, López directed his first feature film, Promedio Rojo (2004), which became a local box office success and screened at international festivals including the Tokyo International Film Festival, SXSW and the Los Angeles Film Festival.

He followed with Santos (2008), a Chile–Spain co-production, which won the Special Jury Prize at Fantastic Fest.

Between 2010 and 2012, López wrote and directed the Qué pena trilogy, which surpassed 500,000 admissions in Chile and later expanded into Mexico with remakes including Qué pena tu vida (2016) and En las buenas y en las malas (2019).

In 2012, López partnered with American director Eli Roth to release Aftershock, which premiered in the Midnight Madness section of the Toronto International Film Festival. He later co-wrote and produced The Green Inferno (2013), which screened at festivals including Toronto and Sitges, and Knock Knock (2015), starring Keanu Reeves and Ana de Armas, which premiered at the Sundance Film Festival.

López also served as executive producer on The Stranger (2014) and The Inhabitant (2018), both directed by Guillermo Amoedo, and co-produced the Chilean films Fuerzas Especiales (2014) and Fuerzas Especiales 2 (2015), which together surpassed 400,000 admissions in Chile.

In 2016, he directed Sin filtro, which became one of the most successful Chilean films of all time with over 1.2 million admissions. The film was later included in a 2025 national survey by Cadem as the third most popular Chilean film of the previous decade.

He followed with Hazlo como hombre (2017), which grossed approximately $13.6 million worldwide and surpassed 4.2 million admissions in Mexico, becoming the highest-grossing Mexican film of its year.

As co-producer, he participated in Ya veremos (2018), which grossed approximately $14.1 million worldwide and became the most-watched Mexican film of that year.

That same year, he directed No estoy loca (2018), which reached around 600,000 admissions in Chile and was later ranked fifth in the same Cadem survey.

In 2019, he directed Dulce Familia, which grossed approximately $5.7 million worldwide.

His body of work, combining original productions and international remakes, has generated approximately $85 million at the worldwide box office and reached more than 20 million theatrical admissions globally. His films have screened at major international festivals including SXSW, Tokyo, Sundance, Toronto, Sitges and Mar del Plata.

In 2025, the Brazilian remake Uma Mulher Sem Filtro debuted on Netflix, ranking among the most-watched titles in Brazil. That same year, López participated as associate producer on the horror film Tormento, released in Mexican theaters.

According to the 2025 Cadem national survey, Sin filtro ranked third and No estoy loca fifth among the most popular Chilean films of the previous decade.

== The López case ==
On 30 June 2018, eight Chilean actresses and models accused Nicolás López of sexual harassment and workplace bullying. The following day, Netflix announced it was putting its deal with Sobras "under review", and López posted a video online stating he was resigning from Sobras and would defend himself against the allegations: "I don't understand what is happening nor the break in my years-long relationships of trust and affection. If I sometimes have been misunderstood, I apologize. But I'm not a stalker nor an abuser."

The accusations, published in the Chilean magazine Revista Sábado, prompted the Fiscalía de Chile, under then regional prosecutor Manuel Guerra, to open an ex officio investigation. During the proceedings, López was held in custody for 14 days before the Corte Suprema de Chile granted a habeas corpus appeal and ordered his release, ruling that the deprivation of liberty was unlawful.

The prosecution was carried out by a team that included prosecutor Lorena Parra, and the judicial proceedings involved judge Alonso Arancibia, with investigative support from the Policía de Investigaciones de Chile (PDI). The accusations were publicly supported by the Fundación para la Confianza and legally represented by Juan Pablo Hermosilla, who acted as counsel for some of the complainants and participated in the public discussion surrounding the case.

On 26 April 2022, López was found guilty of two cases of sexual assault. On 16 May 2022 López was found guilty of two instances of sexual assault and was released under a sentence that required him to undergo psychological treatment.

== Awards ==
Sitges – Catalan International Film Festival

- Nominated, Grand Prize of European Fantasy Film in Silver, Official Fantàstic Panorama Selection, Mis peores amigos: Promedio Rojo, El regreso (2013)
- Nominated, Maria, Best Motion Picture, Aftershock (2012)

Tokyo International Film Festival

- Nominated, Tokyo Grand Prix, Promedio Rojo (2004)

Viña del Mar International Film Festival

- Won, Special Jury Award, Promedio Rojo (2004)

== Filmography ==
=== Film ===
Year	Title	Director	Writer	Producer	Notes
2003	Cesante	No	Yes	Executive	
2004	Promedio Rojo	Yes	Yes	Executive	
2008	Santos	Yes	Yes	Co-producer	Also executive producer
2010	Qué pena tu vida	Yes	Yes	No	
2011	Qué pena tu boda	Yes	Yes	Executive	
2012	Aftershock	Yes	Yes	No	
2012	Qué pena tu familia	Yes	Yes	Executive	
2013	Mis peores amigos: Promedio Rojo, el regreso	Yes	Yes	Executive	
2014	Fuerzas Especiales	No	Yes	Executive	
2015	Knock Knock	No	Yes	Yes	
2016	Sin filtro	Yes	Yes	Executive	
2017	Hazlo como hombre	Yes	Yes	Executive	
2018	No estoy loca	Yes	Yes	No	
2019	Dulce familia	Yes	Yes	No	

==== Producer only ====
Year	Title	Role	Notes
2000	Ángel Negro	Associate producer	
2006	80s, El soundtrack de una generación	Executive producer	Documentary film
2007	Normal con alas	Producer	
2009	Retorno	Producer	
2013	The Green Inferno	Producer	
2014	The Stranger	Producer /Executive producer	
2015	Te Kuhane o te Tupuna: El espíritu de los ancestros	Co-producer	Documentary film
2015	Fuerzas Especiales 2: Cabos sueltos	Executive producer	
2016	Madre	Producer	
2016	Qué pena tu vida	Executive producer	Mexican remake of his film Qué pena tu vida
2017	El habitante	Executive producer	
2018	Una mujer sin filtro	Executive producer	Mexican remake of his film Sin filtro
2018	Sin Rodeos	Executive producer	Spanish remake of his film Sin filtro
2018	Re loca	Executive producer	Argentinian remake of his film Sin filtro
2018	Sin pepita en la lengua	Executive producer	Panamanian remake of his film Sin filtro
2019	En las buenas, en las malas	Executive producer	Mexican remake of his film Qué pena tu boda
2019	Recontraloca	Executive producer	Peruan remake of his film Sin filtro
2020	Cosa de hombres	Executive producer	Chilean remake of his Mexican film Hazlo como hombre
2020	Cambio tutto!	Executive producer	Italian remake of his film Sin filtro
2021	El Mesero	Associate producer	

=== Short film ===
Year	Title	Director	Writer	Producer	Notes
1999	Pajero	Yes	Yes	No	Also cinematographer and editor
1999	Superheroes	Yes	Yes	Yes	
1999	Dédalos	Yes	No	No	Documentary short film
2000	Florofilia	Yes	Yes	Yes	
2019	Cineminuto Cinemex: Dulce Familia	Yes	No	No	Advertisement short

== Television ==
Year	Title	Director	Writer	Producer	Notes
2003	MTV Video Music Awards Latinoamérica 2003	No	Yes	No	TV special
2007	Súper Niño Bully	Yes	Yes	No	TV Short
2011	El Crack	Yes	No	Executive	TV movie; Co-directed with Guillermo Amoedo
2015	Qué pena tu serie	Yes	Yes	Yes	TV series
2015	La leyenda de el Carack	No	No	Executive	TV movie

== Webseries ==
Year	Title	Director	Producer	Notes
2011	El Crack	Yes	Yes	Co-Director with Guillermo Amoedo
2013	Se venden	General Director	No	

== Music videos ==
- Mujer robusta – Sinergia, with Eduardo Bertrán (2002)
- Concurso – Sinergia, with Eduardo Bertrán (2002)
- Chilerobot – Sinergia, with Eduardo Bertrán (2003)
- Te quiero ver muerta – Tiro Al Aire, with Eduardo Bertrán
- Traigo el aguante – Santo Barrio, with Eduardo Bertrán (2002)
- Toma lo que quieras – Claudio Quiñones, with Eduardo Bertrán

== See also ==
- Cinema of Chile
