= Diego Amozurrutia =

Mexican actor, singer and model

- Born: Diego Amozurrutia Torres Landa; August 31, 1990 (age 35); Mexico D. F., Mexico
- Occupations: Actor, model, Singer

Diego Amozurrutia Torres Landa (born August 31, 1990 in Mexico City, Distrito Federal Mexico) is a Mexican actor and model.

== Biography ==
Diego Amozurrutia appeared in the CEA of Televisa.

Presentations throughout the republic with the musical group Burundikids, pipes in caps Barcel promotional and advertising during television broadcasts of the program, The Challenge Burundis as flagship of the group Burundikids, participation in the dance group of Cómplices Al Rescate: Silvana lead vocals in the three accomplices to the rescue disks (Mariana, Silvana and the grand finale), cameo on the soap TV series Rebelde as Andy, stellar performance in La Rosa de Guadalupe as Douglass, starring in the second season starring Central de Abastos in one chapter, as Eros starring in the film: director Divina Confusión of Salvador Garcini (2008), starring in the Fox series Tiempo Final as Mario (3rd season) in 2009, starring in the TV series Mi Pecado (Maite Perroni, Eugenio Siller) as Josué

In 2010, he joined the cast of the TV series Llena de amor, produced by Angelli Nesma.

A year later, in 2011, a new look and take part in the melodrama of the producer Lucero Suarez Amorcito Corazon.

In 2013 he was cast as Daniel Parra in Gossip Girl: Acapulco.

== Filmography ==
=== Television ===
Year	Title	Role	Notes
2009	La rosa de Guadalupe	Juan Douglas	Episode: "Amor sin fronteras" Episode: "Los poetas malditos"
2009	Tiempo final	Mario	Episode: "Diva"
2009	Mi pecado	Josué Huerta Almada	
2010	Llena de amor	Axel Ruiz y de Teresa Curiel	
2011	Como dice el dicho	Gerardo	Episode: "Nadie sabe lo que tiene hasta que lo pierde"
2011-12	Amorcito corazón	Juancho Pinzon	
2013	Gossip Girl: Acapulco	Daniel Parra	
2013-14	Quiero amarte	Ulises Orteaga	
2016	Entre correr y vivir	Guillermo Aldana	
2019	Cuna de lobos	Alejandro Larios Creel	
2022	Cabo	Eduardo Noriega Alargon	
2023	El príncipe del barrio	Chepino Oropeza	Episode: "La feria del elote"
2024	Lalola	Lalo	
2025	Doménica Montero	Max Languer de la Vega	

=== Films ===
- Divina Confusión (2008) – Cupido
- Cindy la Regía (2020) – Eduardo

== Discography ==
- Cómplices Al Rescate: Silvana (2002)
- Cómplices Al Rescate: Mariana (2002)
- Disco con Burundikids
- El reto Burundis
- Muévete
- Dime
- Por ti
- No Pido más

Álbum como solista, Adelante

- Duele Perderte
- Hong Kong
- Sin Miedo
- Mujer Mágica
