= The Mooring =

The Mooring may refer to:

- The Mooring (2012 film), an American thriller film directed by Glenn Withrow.
- The Mooring (2021 film), a Mexican horror film directed by Tamae Garateguy.
