= Mooring (disambiguation) =

A mooring is any structure to which a vessel may be secured by means of cables, anchors, or lines.

Mooring may also refer to:

- Mooring (oceanography), a collection of devices connected to a wire and anchored on the sea floor
- Mooring (North Frisian dialect)
- Mooring (surname)
- Mooring, Texas
- The Mooring (2012 film), an American thriller film
- The Mooring (2021 film), a Mexican horror film
- The Moorings, New York, a private community

== See also ==
- Mooring mast, a structure designed to hold airships and blimps securely in the open when they are not in flight
- Moring
