= Landfall (disambiguation) =

Landfall is the time at which a storm passes over to shore.

Landfall may also refer to:

== Places ==
- Landfall, Minnesota, United States
- Landfall, also known as Kent Cottage, Brigus, Newfoundland
- Landfall Island, Andaman and Nicobar Islands, India
- Landfall Peak, Thurston Island, Antarctica

== Popular culture ==
- Landfall (journal), a New Zealand literary journal
- Landfall (1949 film), a British film
- Landfall (1975 film), a New Zealand film
- Landfall (2017 film), an Australian thriller film
- Landfall (Martin Carthy album), 1971
- Landfall (Wage War album), 2026
- Landfall: A Channel Story, a novel by Nevil Shute
- Landfall, a 2018 album by Laurie Anderson with Kronos Quartet

== Other uses ==
- Landfall (company), the Swedish video game developer
- Landfall, the name given to the vessel LCT 7074 by the Master Mariners' Club of Liverpool

== See also ==
- Landing (disambiguation)
- Mooring (disambiguation)
- Docking (disambiguation)
- Land (disambiguation)
- Fall (disambiguation)
