= Gutter Anthems =

Studio album by Enter the Haggis
- Released: March 17, 2009
- Recorded: at Metalworks Studios in Mississauga, Ontario
- Genre: Folk rock
- Label: UFO Music
- Producer: Enter the Haggis, Tim Abraham

Enter the Haggis chronology
Northampton	Gutter Anthems

Gutter Anthems is the 7th studio album for Enter the Haggis. It is the fourth album on their current label, UFO Music (United for Opportunity), and was produced by the band and Tim Abraham. The album was recorded in Mississauga, Ontario at Metalworks Studios & The Hive studios.

== Track listing ==
1. Intro
2. The Litter and the Leaves
3. Cameos
4. DNA
5. Did You Call Me Albatross?
6. Noseworthy & Piercy
7. The Death of Johnny Mooring
8. Suburban Plains
9. Real Life / Alibis
10. Murphy's Ashes
11. Sea of Crutches
12. Bury My Demons
13. The Ghosts of Calico
14. Lights and Cars
15. Broken Line

== Production ==
Producer - Enter the Haggis, Tim Abraham
Engineer & Mixing - Tim Abraham

== Personnel ==
- Brian Buchanan - vocals, Hammond C-3, fiddle, piano, acoustic guitar, Fender Rhodes, mandolin, synthesizer, Nashville guitar, accordion
- Trevor Lewington - vocals, electric guitar, acoustic guitar
- Craig Downie - vocals, highland bagpipe, whistle, harmonica
- Mark Abraham - vocals, electric bass, mandolin
- James Campbell - drum kit, percussion
- Miranda Mulholland - backing vocals on tracks 2 & 11
- The Elders - backing vocals on track 2
- Tim Abraham - backing vocals on tracks 2, 8 & 13
- Michael Olsen - cellos on tracks 7 & 15
- Anthony Giles - udu on track 8, tablas on track 11
