= Cómplices Al Rescate =

- Genre: Telenovela
- Screenplay by: Lourdes Barrios; Consuelo Garrido
- Story by: Socorro González
- Directed by: Adriana Barraza; Salvador Sánchez; Alejandro Aragón
- Starring: Laura Flores; Francisco Gattorno; Belinda; Norma Herrera; Johnny Lozada; Cecilia Gabriela; Silvia Lomelí; Maribel Fernández; Raúl Magaña; Miguel Pizarro
- Theme music composer: Christina Abaroa; Alejandro Abaroa; Pablo Aguirre
- Opening theme: Cómplices Al Rescate by Belinda & Fabián Chávez
- Country of origin: Mexico
- Original language: Spanish
- No. of episodes: 132

Production
- Executive producer: Rosy Ocampo
- Camera setup: Multi-camera
- Running time: 41-44 minutes
- Production company: Televisa

Original release
- Network: Canal de las Estrellas
- Release: 7 January – 12 July 2002

Related
- Hum 2 Hain Na (2004–05); Συνένοχοι για τη διάσωση (2007); Cúmplices de um Resgate (2015–16)

Cómplices Al Rescate (English: Accomplices to the Rescue) is a Mexican children's-teen telenovela produced by Rosy Ocampo for Televisa. It premiered on 7 January 2002, and ended on 12 July 2002.

Belinda starred as child protagonist, playing the twins Silvana and Mariana, being replaced by Daniela Luján, in chapter 92. Laura Flores and Francisco Gattorno play the adult protagonists of the plot, while Cecilia Gabriela and Raúl Magaña starred as adult antagonists. Grisel Margarita and Mickey Santana starred as child antagonists.

== Plot ==
Mariana Cantú and Silvana Del Valle are twin sisters who were separated on the day of their birth. Mariana stayed with her biological mother, a modest seamstress named Rocio Cantu, her grandmother Doña Pura and her aunt Helena who, despite having all the difficulties, are very united and happy. Mariana is a noble, sweet, cheerful and much loved girl throughout the village. Meanwhile, Silvana is stolen by Regina to pose as her own daughter with her husband Rolando, who Silvana grows up believing is her biological father, as she cannot have children herself in order to keep him and his money at her side. Orlando loves his daughter deeply despite Silvana's strong temperament. She is also superficial and cold.

After 12 years, the twins meet again, and they see the uncanny resemblance between them. Silvana asks Mariana to switch places with her for a day so that she can audition as Silvana and get a part in a famous upcoming children's band called "Cómplices al Rescate", as Mariana can sing well and Silvana cannot sing at all. A while later, Silvana's "father" Rolando's heart illness becomes worse and he eventually suffers a stroke, which leaves him in the hospital. Regina, thinking Rolando has left all his money to her in his will, sees this as an opportunity to kill Rolando and have what she's always wanted, his fortune. Regina tells a weak Rolando that Silvana is not his biological daughter and that she has only been with him for his money the entire marriage. This angers Rolando, who then tries to get up and hurt Regina but ends up suffering another heart attack and dies on the scene.

Regina is then informed that Rolando had changed his will at the last minute, seeing as how she was always cold and never a real mother to Silvana, and left all the money to Silvana, leaving her nanny, Macrina and her godfather, Raul, in charge of the fortune until Silvana turns eighteen. This infuriates Regina, who then realizes that the twins have met and uses this as an opportunity to get the inheritance back under her name and remain rich. Regina and Gerardo then decide to kidnap Mariana too and force her to pose as Silvana, seeing as how she is actually able to sing, with the intention of making a fortune off of the Complices band and eventually, get back the inheritance. Macrina is now in charge of Mariana, and sees how Mariana is becoming friends with the Complices. She tells Mariana that perhaps the Complices will be able to help. Mariana opens up to Joaquin, Julia, Felipe and Andres, who agree to help return both twins to their mother.

Throughout the series they meet people like Joaquin and his siblings. Joaquin is an orphan along with his sister Julia and his brother Felipe. Their parents died in a car accident and the kids were left in the care of his aunt Florencia, who later gets tired of them and abandons them. With the help of their friend and neighbor Andres (who is secretly in love with Julia) and his parents, these kids can keep living alone in the home. This becomes their biggest secret, one they must keep at all costs from the world, especially their neighbor Doña Meche, who becomes obsessed with proving that the children live alone.

The twins are returned to Rocio, who is shocked to find out she truly did have twins as she suspected throughout her entire pregnancy. But being from a small, humble town, she was unable to get any sort of ultrasound done. Shortly after, Alberto asks Rocio to marry him. She accepts and the two wed. When the truth about what Regina and Gerardo did comes to light, Gerardo flees and Regina fakes her own death. Rocio and her family move into Silvana's adopted father mansion, which she had unknowingly inherited after his death.

This is where the second half of the story commences. While Silvana was posing as Mariana, she realized that Rocio really wasn't aware that she had twins and did not give her up shortly after her birth. This helps Silvana unlock her singing voice and allows her to sing as beautifully as Mariana. The two twins now begin singing together as the lead vocalists of the Complices. Regina comes back at this point under the alias Tania Belmont to take her revenge on Silvana. This becomes the main focus of the second half of the telenovela.

"Tania" opens up a new record label, Enter Records with the intent of starting a new band to destroy the Complices and get Silvana on her label so that she can gain her trust and get back Rolando's fortune. Tania offers Silvana a recording contract as the one and only vocalist of a new band she calls Silvana y los Bandidos (Silvana and the Bandits). Silvana accepts, leaving Mariana heartbroken and the other Complices hurting.

== Cast ==
=== Main ===
- Laura Flores as Rocío Cantú
- Francisco Gattorno as Alberto del Río
- Belinda as Mariana Cantú and Silvana del Valle Ontiveros (episodes 1–91)
- Daniela Luján as Mariana Cantú and Silvana del Valle Ontiveros (episodes 92–132)
- Norma Herrera as Doña Pura
- Johnny Lozada as Sebastián
- Gustavo Rojo as Dr. Federico Rueda
- Cecilia Gabriela as Regina Ontiveros Vda. del Valle/Tania Velmont
- Silvia Lomelí as Helena Cantú
- Maribel Fernández as Macrina Bautista
- Raúl Magaña as Gerardo Ontiveros
- Miguel Pizarro as Vicente Rosales
- Ramiro Torres as Ramón
- Alejandro Speitzer as Felipe Olmos
- Mickey Santana as Omar Contreras
- Grisel Margarita as Priscila Ricco Ontiveros
- Martha Sabrina as Julia Olmos
- Geraldine Galván as Doris Torres
- Vadhir Derbez as Andrés Rosales
- Isaac Castro as Mateo Torres
- Ana Valeria as Dulce Rosales
- Fabián Chávez as Joaquín Olmos
- Rafael del Villar as Dr. Raúl Olivo
- Rossana San Juan as Lorna Rico
- Adriana Chapela as Alicia
- Arlette Pacheco as Florencia
- Gerardo Albarrán as Arturo Vargas
- Carlos Bonavides as Ofelio
- Martín Ricca as Martín
- Naydelin Navarrete as Naydelin Mendoza
- Roberto Marín as Roberto Obregón
- Olivia Bucio as Marcela
- Raúl Buenfil as Jaime Obregón
- Francisco Avendaño as Héctor
- Adriana Laffan as Lourdes "Lulu" Mendoza
- Patricia Martínez as María Contreras
- Héctor Parra as Santiago Salas
- Eugenio Derbez as Mantequilla's voice

=== Recurring ===
- Pedro Weber "Chatanuga" as Don Giuseppe
- Aida Pierce as Biba Solasi
- Paco Ibáñez as Fortunato Ricco
- Irina Areu as María Eugenia "Maru"
- Roberto "Puck" Miranda as Damián
- Verónica Macías as Clarita (episodes 1–20)
- Yolanda Ventura as Clarita (episodes 21–104)
- Orlando Miguel as Pepe (episodes 1–54)
- Uberto Bondoni as Pepe (episodes 55–102)
- Miguel Priego as Father Arango
- Joana Brito as Doña Meche
- Miguel Ángel Fuentes as El Sombras
- Mariana Sánchez as Mrs. Yoli
- Leonardo Trevole as El Trampas
- Gerardo Albarrán as Arturo Vargas
- Esteban Franco as Herminio
- Benjamín Islas as El Navajas
- Ana Silvia Contreras as Lolita
- Sergio Acosta as Joel Contreras
- Mónica Dossetti as Sonia
- Óscar Traven as Sr. Torres
- Alejandro Aragón as Luis Torres
- Ricardo Vera as Comandante Malpica
- Arturo Vázquez as Antonio
- Agustín Arana as Rodolfo García
- Gerardo Gallardo as Tijerino
- Dalilah Polanco as Nina Kuti Kuti

=== Guest stars ===
- Manuel Saval as Rolando del Valle
- Polly as Maestra Glafira
- Jacqueline Bracamontes as Jocelyn

== Awards ==
Year	Award	Category	Nominee	Result
2002	Premios Oye	Best Soloist Grupero	Cómplices Al Rescate: Mariana	Nominated
2002	3rd Latin Grammy Awards	Best Children's Album	Cómplices Al Rescate: Silvana; Cómplices Al Rescate: Mariana	Nominated
2002	3rd Latin Grammy Awards	Best Children's Album	Cómplices Al Rescate: El Gran Final	Nominated
2002	Premios Eres Niños	The Super Actress	Belinda	Won
2002	Premios Eres Niños	The More Overtone	Belinda	Won

== Soundtracks ==
- Cómplices Al Rescate: Silvana
- Cómplices Al Rescate: Mariana
- Cómplices Al Rescate: El Gran Final
- Canta con Cómplices Al Rescate
