= Mooring (surname) =

Mooring is a surname. Notable people with the surname include:

- George Mooring (1908–1969), British civil servant
- Jim Mooring (1917–2007), Australian rules footballer
- Johnny Mooring (1927–1974), Canadian singer-songwriter
- Leeland Dayton Mooring (born 1988), American singer, member of the Christian band Leeland
  - Jack Anthony Mooring and Shelly Mooring, also members of the Christian band Leeland
- Jeff Mooring, American actor
- John Mooring, American football tackle and center
