= Casualties of Retail =

Studio album by Enter the Haggis
- Released: October 25, 2005
- Genres: Rock; Album-oriented rock
- Length: 47:22
- Label: United for Opportunity
- Producer: Joao Carvalho

Enter the Haggis chronology
Let the Wind Blow High (1999)	Casualties of Retail (2005)	Soapbox Heroes (2006)

Casualties of Retail is an album by Enter the Haggis, released on the United for Opportunity label on October 25, 2005 (see 2005 in music). The title comes from a line in the song "Gasoline" (track three).

== Track listing ==
1. "Music Box"
2. "Another Round"
3. "Gasoline"
4. "Twirling Towards Freedom"
5. "Congress"
6. "Haven"
7. "Minstrel Boy"
8. "Martha Stuart"
9. "She Moved Through the Fair"
10. "Life for Love"
11. "To the Quick"
12. "Down with the Ship"

== Personnel ==
- Brian Buchanan - vocals, fiddle, acoustic guitar, banjo, mandolin
- Craig Downie - highland and Deger bagpipes, vocals, tin whistle, jaw harp, harmonica
- Mark Abraham - electric bass, vocals
- James Campbell - drums, percussion, vocals
- Trevor Lewington - vocals, electric and acoustic guitars, banjo
- Congas, timbales and cowbells by Anthony Giles
- Harmonica on "Another Round" by Paul Reddick
