= ¿Quién es la máscara? (Mexican TV series) season 1 =

¿Quién es la máscara?
- Season 1
- Hosted by: Omar Chaparro
- Judges: Consuelo Duval; Carlos Rivera; Yuri; Adrián Uribe
- No. of contestants: 16
- Winner: Vadhir Derbez as "Camaleón"
- Runner-up: Patricia Manterola as "Lechuza"
- No. of episodes: 8

Release
- Original network: Las Estrellas
- Original release: August 25 – October 13, 2019

Season chronology
- Next → Season 2

The first season of ¿Quién es la máscara? premiered on August 25, 2019, and lasted for 8 episodes. On October 13, 2019, Camaleón (actor Vadhir Derbez) was declared the winner, and Lechuza (actress and singer Patricia Manterola) the runner-up.

== Panelists and host ==
Season 1 panelists and host

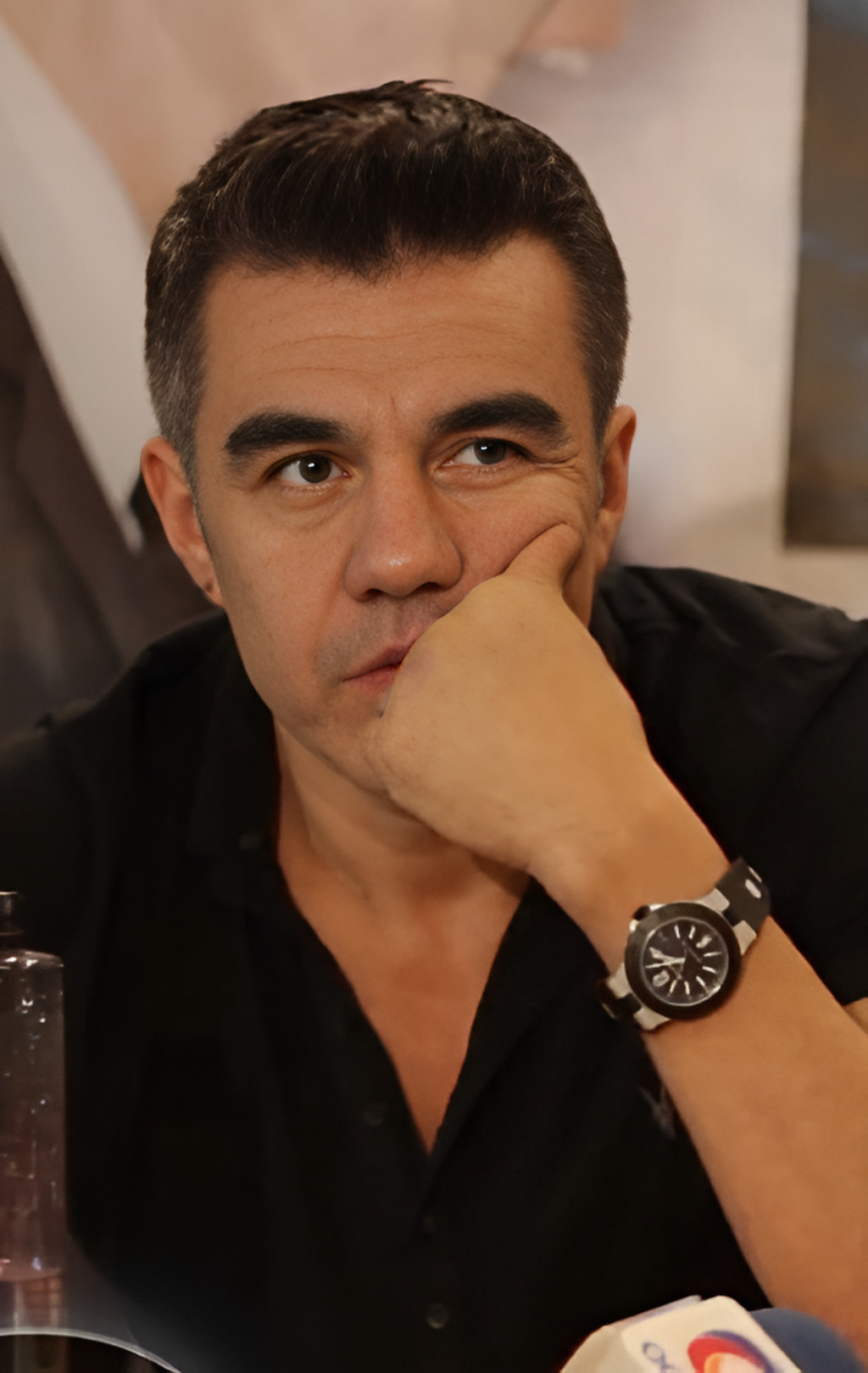
Adrián Uribe

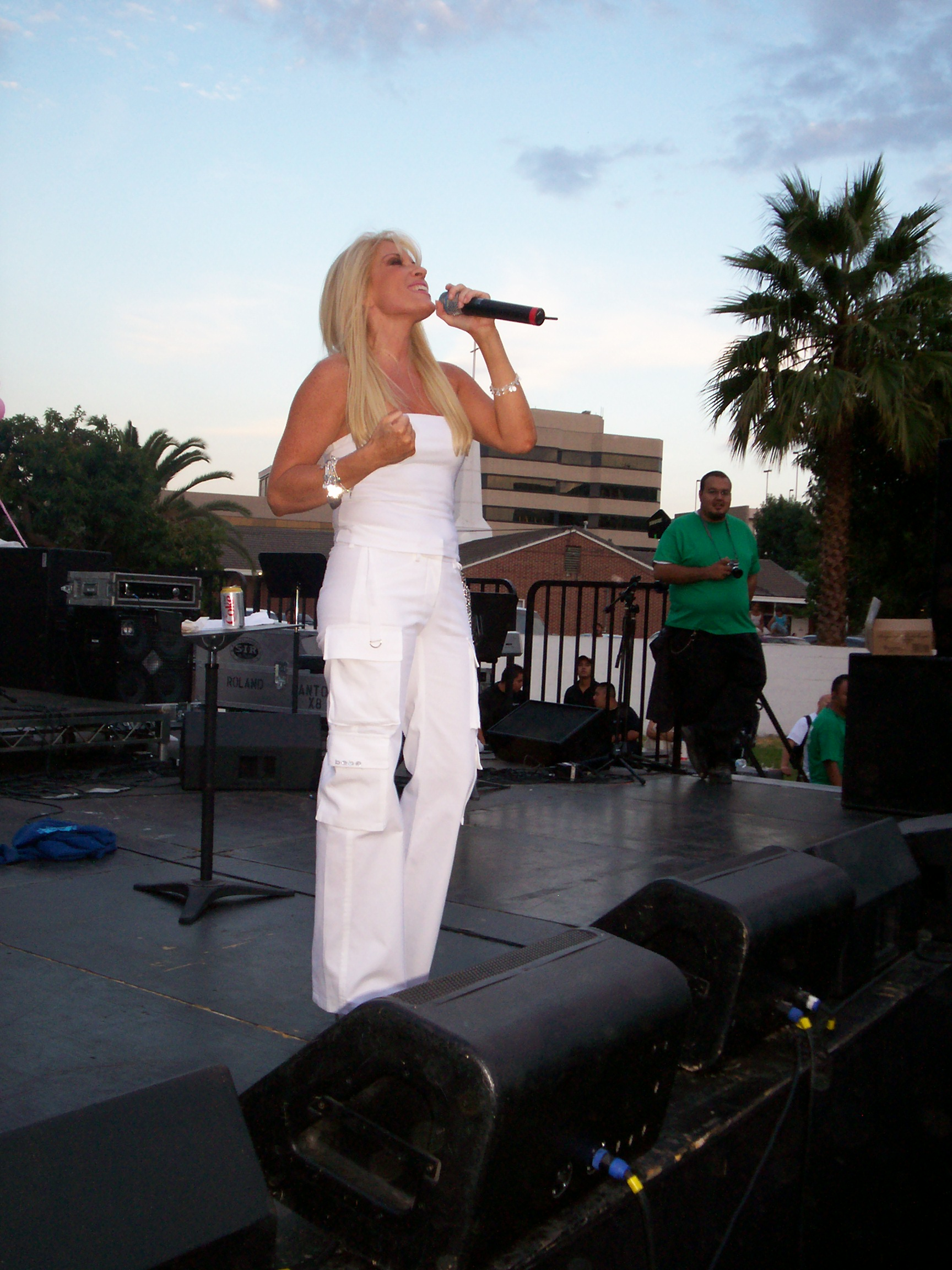
Yuri

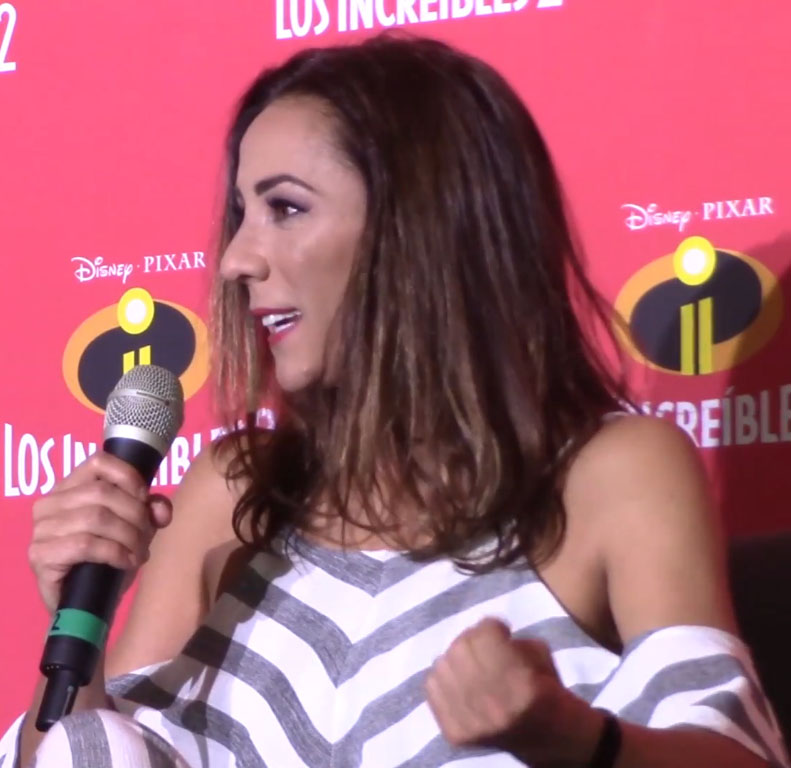
Consuelo Duval

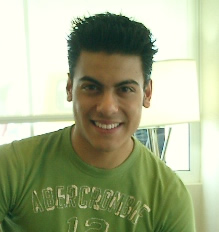
Carlos Rivera

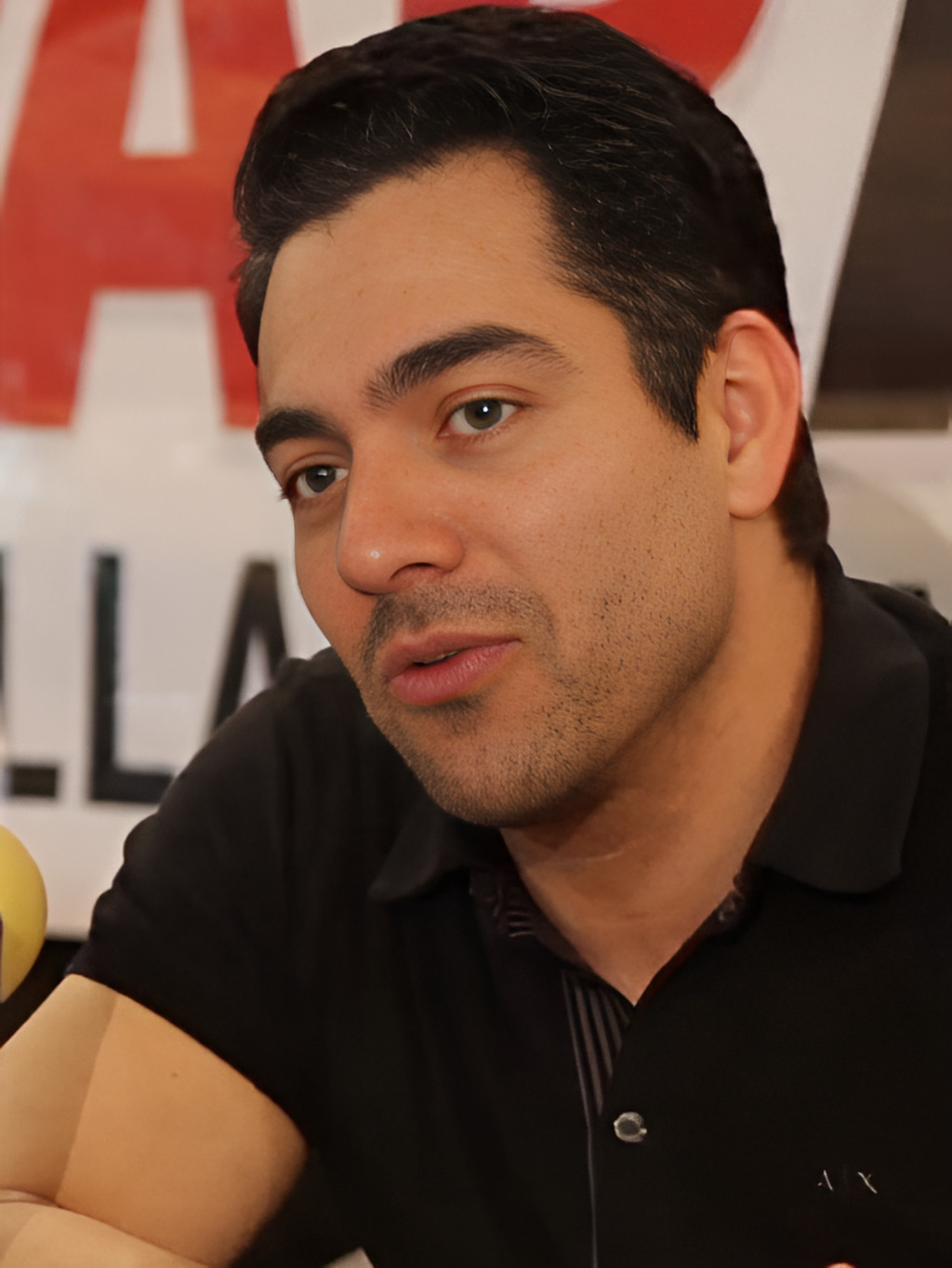
Omar Chaparro

The judging panel consists of actor and comedian Adrián Uribe, singer Yuri, actress and comedian Consuelo Duval, and singer Carlos Rivera. Omar Chaparro hosted the show.

Throughout the season, various guest panelists appeared as the fifth judge in the judging panel for one episode. These guest panelists included football coach Miguel Herrera (episode 6), actress Paz Vega (episode 7), and actress Michelle Renaud (episode 7).

== Contestants ==
Stage name	Celebrity	Occupation(s)	Episodes									
Stage name	Celebrity	Occupation(s)	1	2	3	4	5	6	7		8	
Stage name	Celebrity	Occupation(s)	1	2	3	4	5	6	A	B	A	B
Camaleón	Vadhir Derbez	Actor	WIN		WIN	SAFE	SAFE	SAFE	SAFE	SAFE	SAFE	WINNER
Lechuza	Patricia Manterola	Actress and singer	WIN		WIN	SAFE	SAFE	SAFE	SAFE	SAFE	SAFE	RUNNER-UP
Cebra	Mario Bautista	Singer		WIN	WIN	SAFE	SAFE	SAFE	SAFE	RISK	SAFE	THIRD
Monstruo	Michelle Rodríguez	Actress	RISK		RISK	RISK	SAFE	SAFE	SAFE	SAFE	OUT	
Conejo	Natalia Sosa	Singer		WIN	RISK	SAFE	SAFE	SAFE	RISK	SAFE	OUT	
Zorro	Regina Blandón	Actress	RISK		WIN	SAFE	RISK	RISK	SAFE	OUT		
Minotauro	Alan Ibarra	Singer	WIN		WIN	SAFE	SAFE	SAFE	OUT			
Marciano	José Manuel Figueroa	Singer		RISK	RISK	SAFE	RISK	OUT				
Gato	Ilse Olivo	Singer		WIN	WIN	SAFE	OUT					
Catrina	Rocío Banquells	Actress and singer	WIN		RISK	OUT						
Pez	Stephanie Cayo	Actress		RISK	OUT							
Águila	Laureano Brizuela	Singer		WIN	OUT							
Abejorro	Claudio Yarto	Singer		OUT								
Panda	Alejandro Suárez	Actor		OUT								
Gallo	Moisés Muñoz	Retired footballer	OUT									
Ciervo	Johnny Lozada	Actor and singer	OUT									

The masked singer won their face-off and remained in the competition.
The masked singer lost their face-off, but was not eliminated.
The masked singer was safe from elimination.
The masked singer was eliminated from the competition.
The masked singer did not perform.
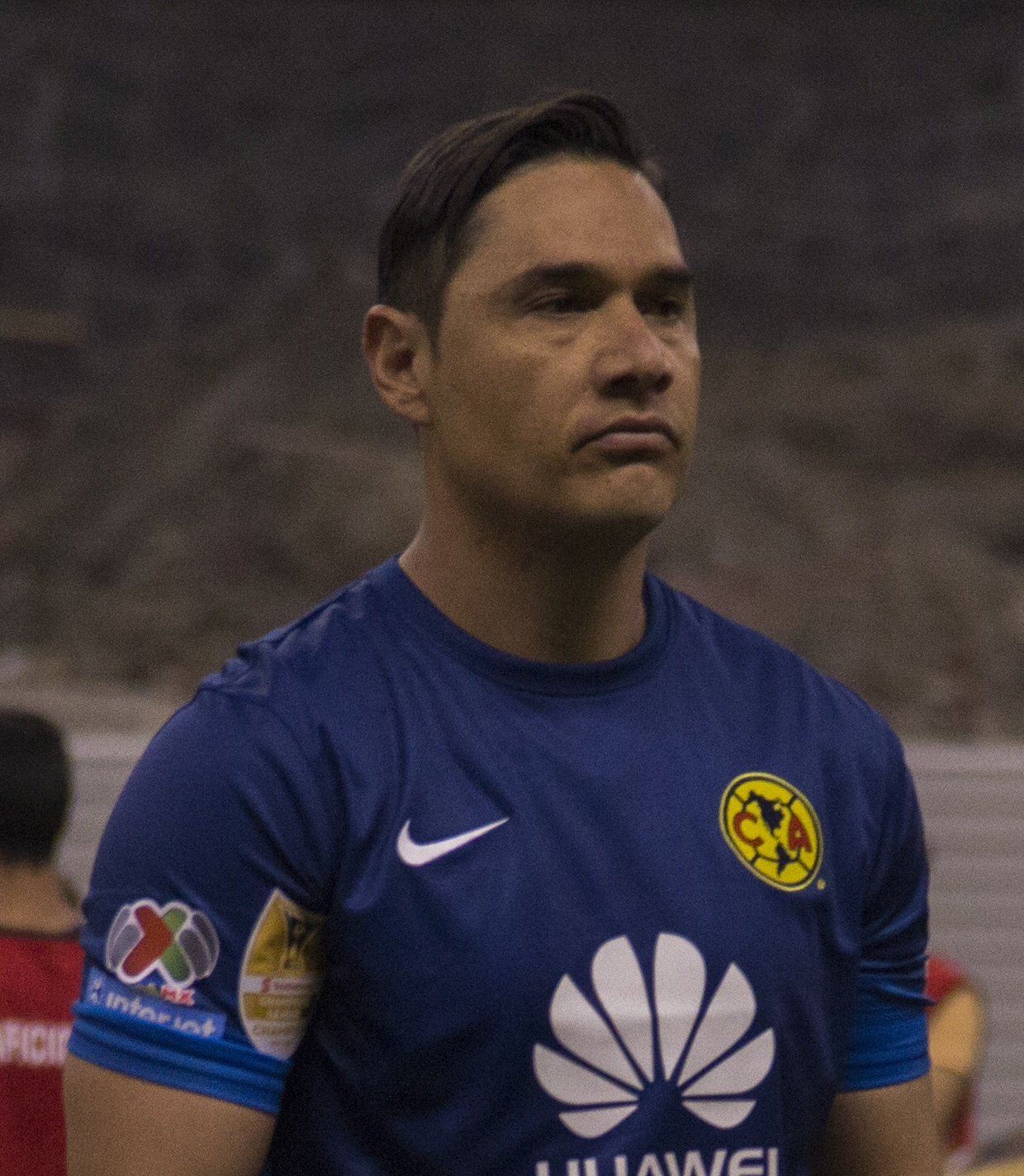
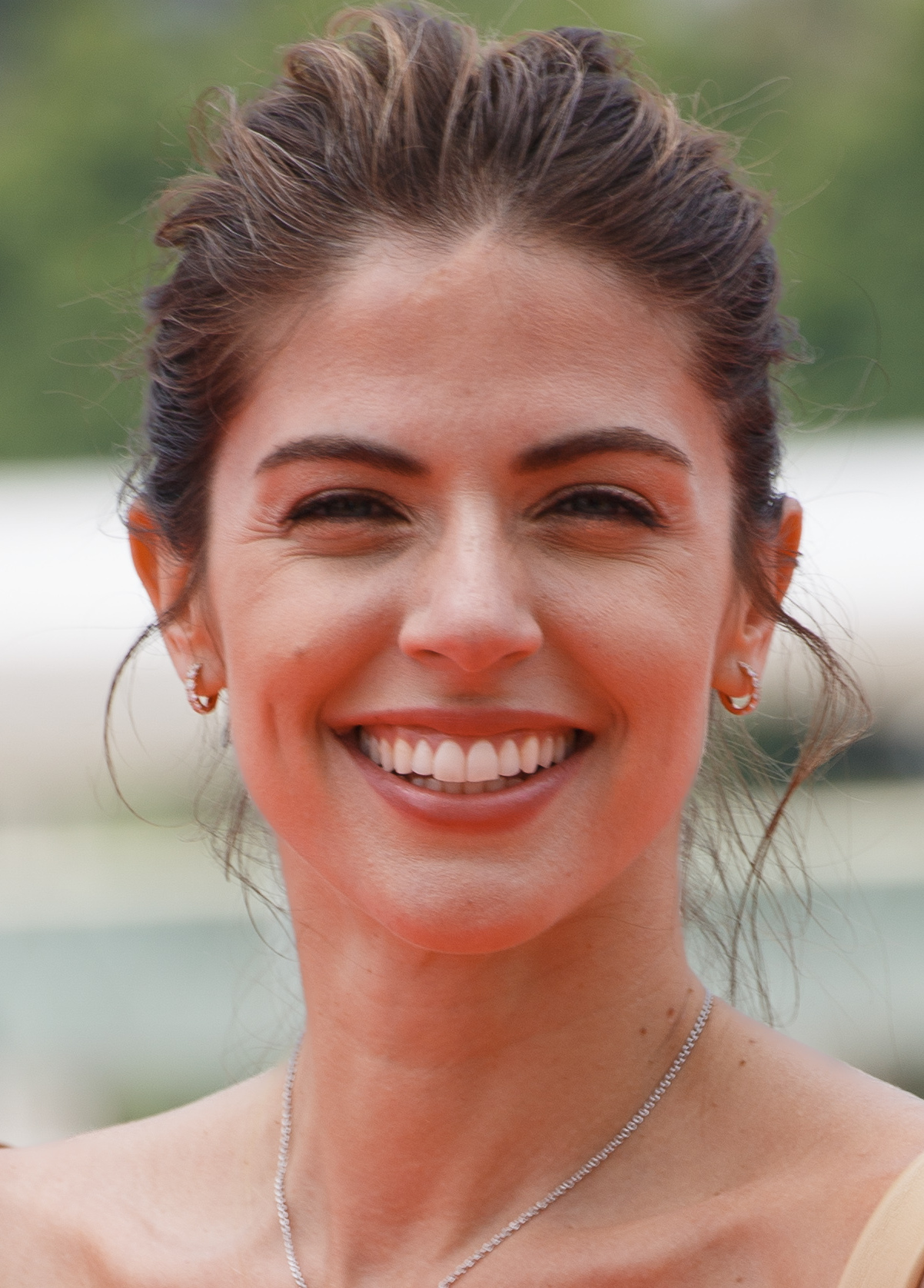
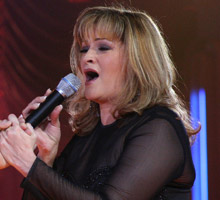
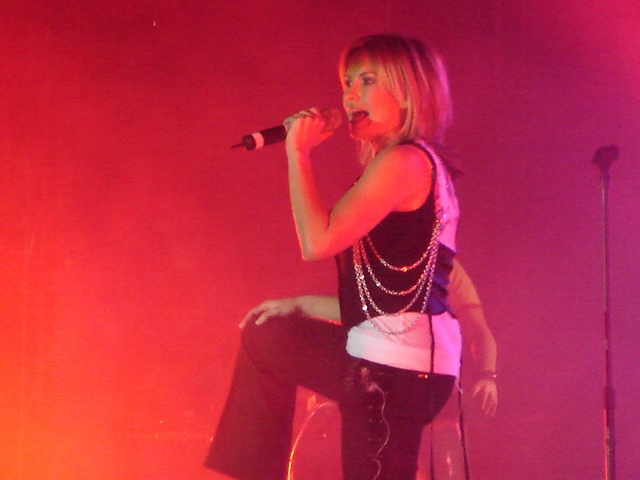
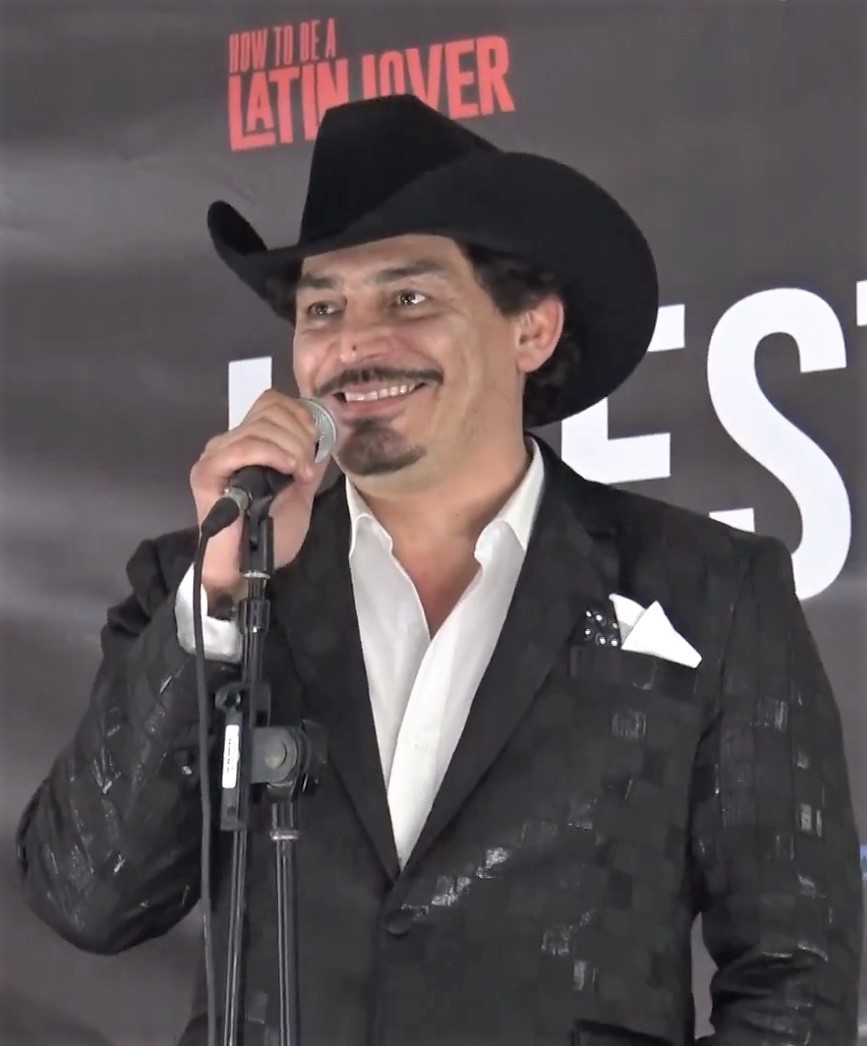
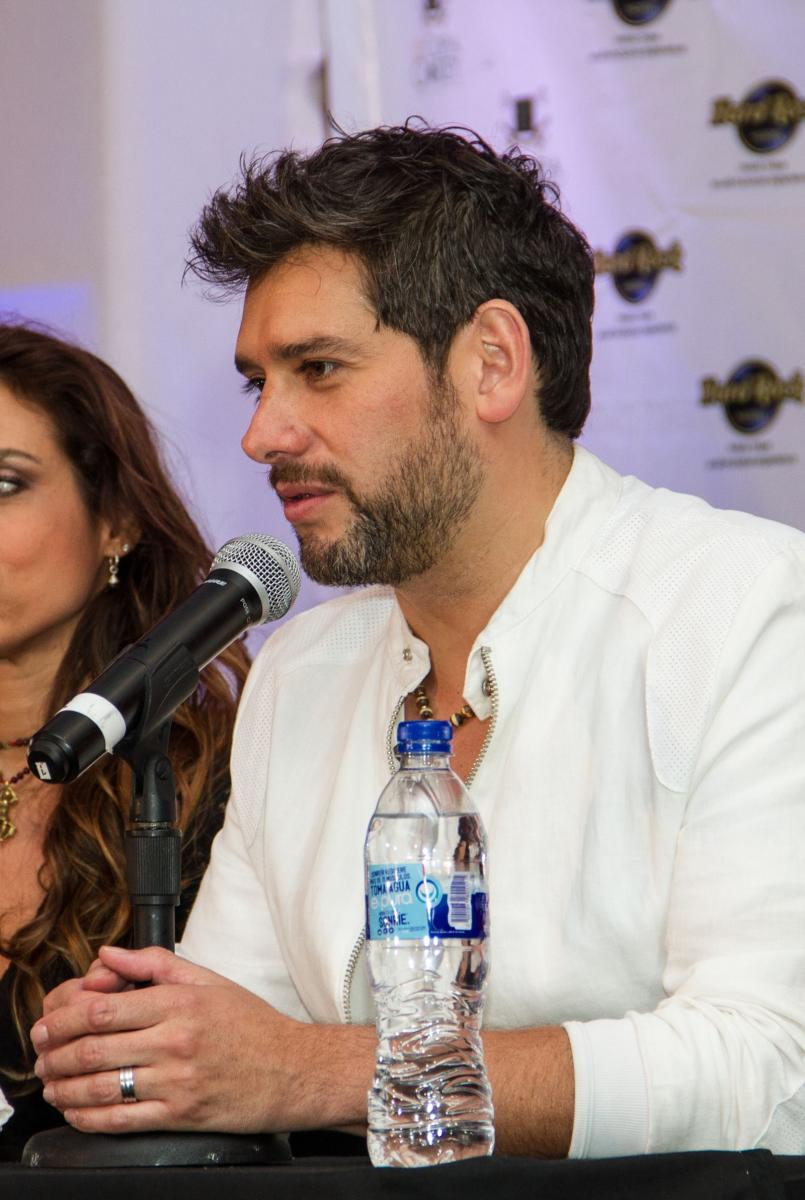
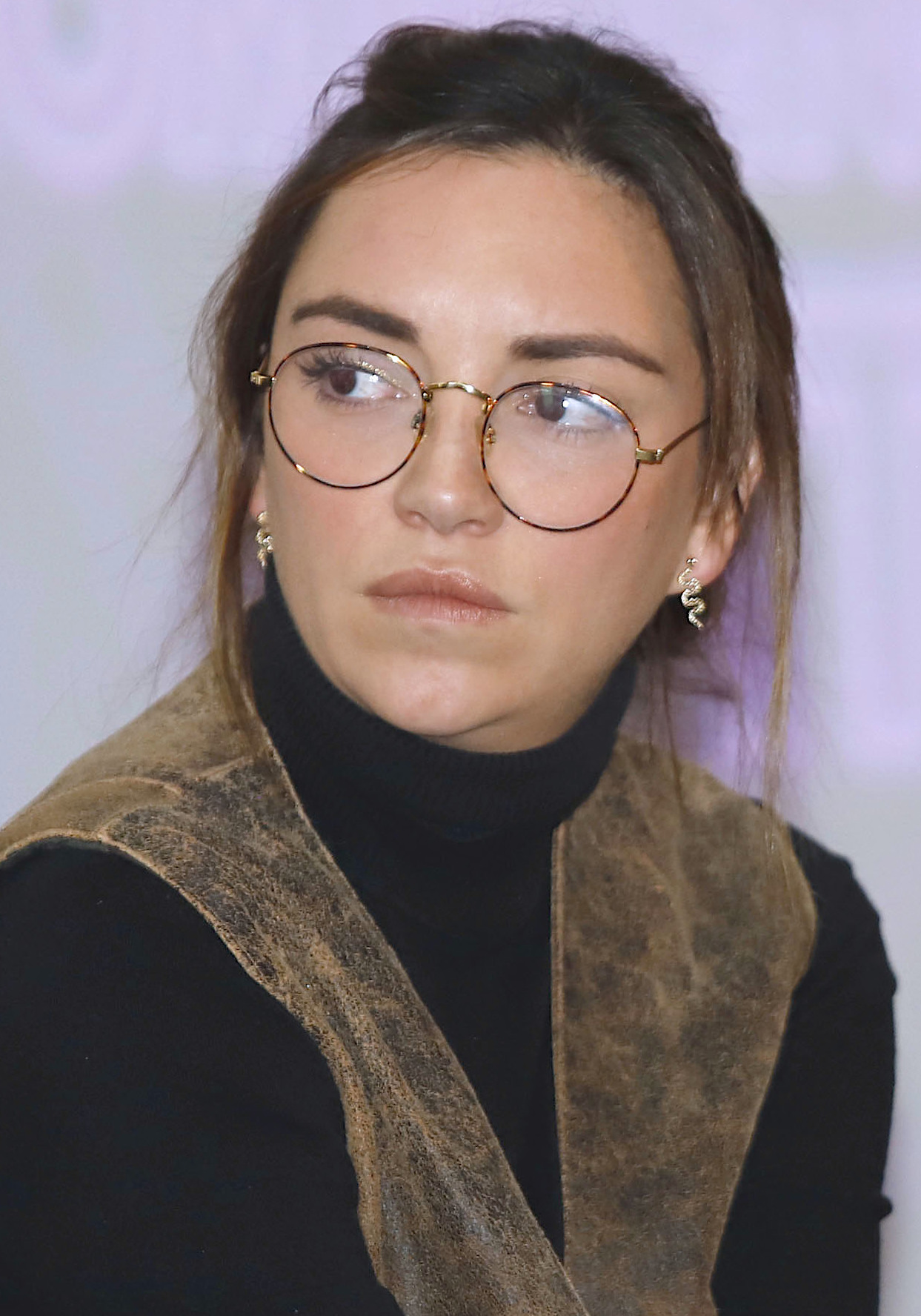
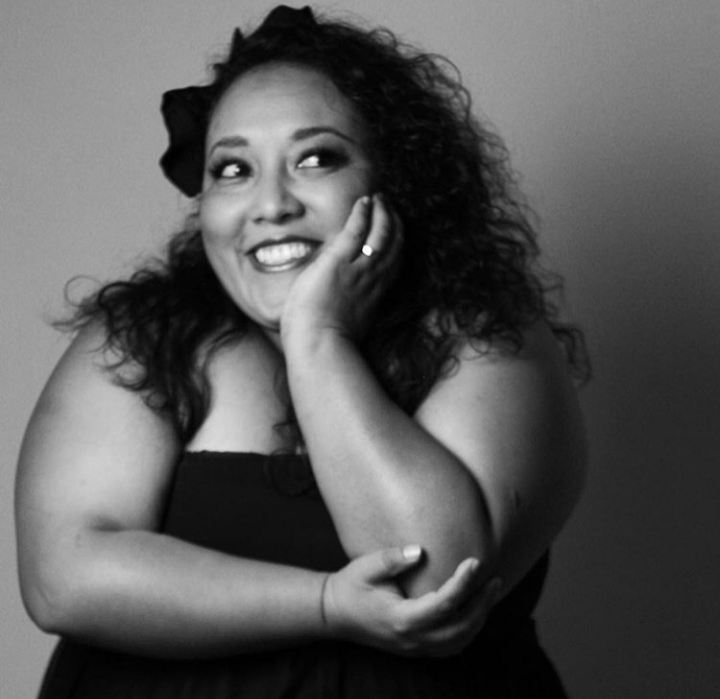
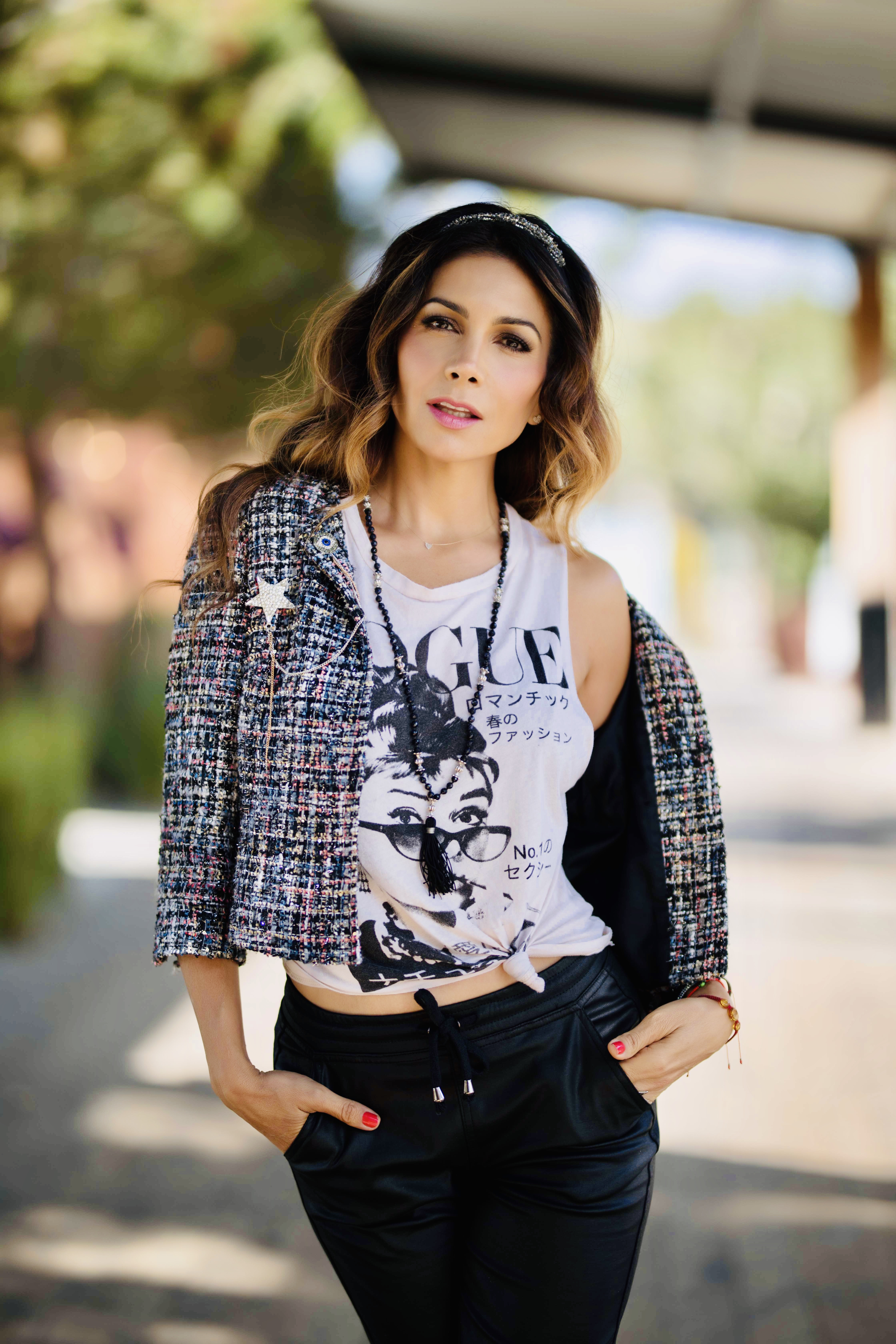
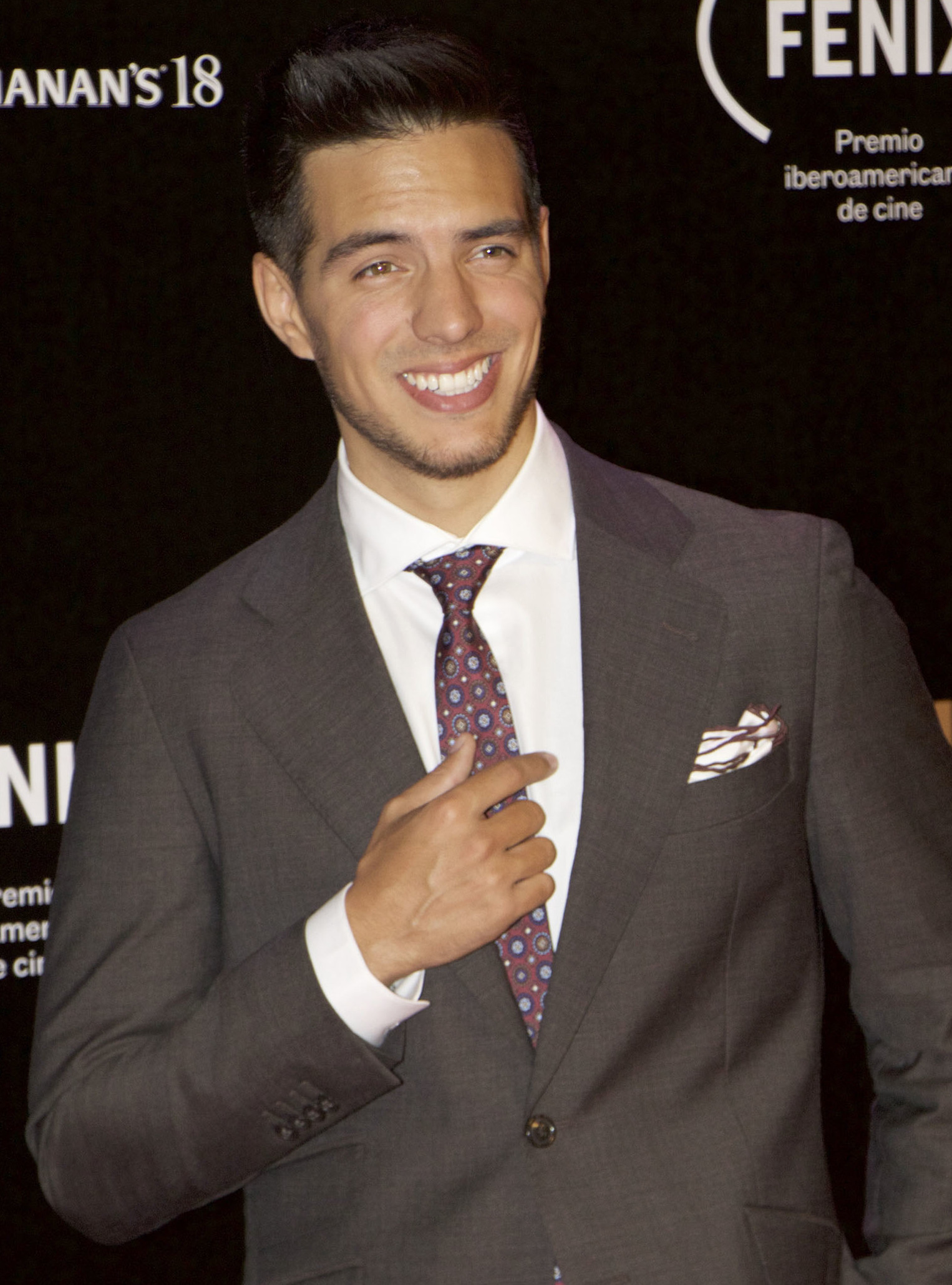
The celebrities who competed in the second season of ¿Quién es la máscara?, pictured in order of elimination (L-R):
Moisés Muñoz ("Gallo"), Stephanie Cayo ("Pez"), Rocío Banquells ("Catrina"), Ilse Olivo ("Gato"), José Manuel Figueroa ("Marciano"), Alan Ibarra ("Minutauro"), Regina Blandón ("Zorro"), Michelle Rodríguez ("Monstruo"), Mauricio Bautista ("Cebra"), Patricia Manterola ("Lechuza"), and Vadhir Derbez ("Camaleón")
Not pictured: Johnny Lozada ("Ciervo"), Alejandro Suárez ("Panda"), Claudio Yarto ("Abejorro"), Laureano Brizuela ("Águila") and Natalia Sosa ("Conejo")

== Episodes ==
=== Week 1 (August 25) ===
Performances on the first episode
#	Stage name	Song	Identity	Result
1	Monstruo	"1, 2, 3" by Sofía Reyes	undisclosed	RISK
2	Catrina	"Mañana Es Too Late" by Jesse & Joy & J Balvin	undisclosed	WIN
3	Minotauro	"Cuando Seas Grande" by Miguel Mateos	undisclosed	WIN
4	Ciervo	"Fuerte No Soy" by Intocable	Johnny Lozada	OUT
5	Gallo	"El Color De Tus Ojos" by Banda MS	Moisés Muñoz	OUT
6	Camaleón	"Taki Taki" by DJ Snake	undisclosed	WIN
7	Lechuza	"Vente Pa' Ca" by Ricky Martin	undisclosed	WIN
8	Zorro	"The Edge of Glory" by Lady Gaga	undisclosed	RISK

=== Week 2 (September 1) ===
Performances on the second episode
#	Stage name	Song	Identity	Result
1	Conejo	"Inolvidable" by Jenni Rivera	undisclosed	WIN
2	Pez	"Million Reasons" by Lady Gaga	undisclosed	RISK
3	Panda	"Con Todos Menos Conmigo" by Timbiriche	Alejandro Suárez	OUT
4	Águila	"I Will Always Love You" by Dolly Parton	undisclosed	WIN
5	Gato	"Mayores" by Becky G	undisclosed	WIN
6	Abejorro	"Sabor a Mí" by Los Panchos	Claudio Yarto	OUT
7	Cebra	"Everybody" by Backstreet Boys	undisclosed	WIN
8	Marciano	"Marciano" by Molotov	undisclosed	RISK

=== Week 3 (September 8) ===
Performances on the third episode
#	Stage name	Song	Identity	Result
1	Cebra	"Mi Gente" by J Balvin	undisclosed	WIN
2	Monstruo	"Roxanne" by The Police	undisclosed	RISK
3	Águila	"La Camisa Negra" by Juanes	Laureano Brizuela	OUT
4	Minotauro	"Feeling Good" by Muse	undisclosed	WIN
5	Zorro	"Si Te Vas" by Shakira	undisclosed	WIN
6	Marciano	"She Will Be Loved" by Maroon 5	undisclosed	RISK
7	Pez	"Muriendo Lento" by Moderatto	Stephanie Cayo	OUT
8	Gato	"Las Ultras" by Calibre 50	undisclosed	WIN
9	Camaleón	"I'm Yours" by Jason Mraz	undisclosed	WIN
10	Catrina	"No Me Acuerdo" by Thalía	undisclosed	RISK
11	Lechuza	"...Baby One More Time" by Britney Spears	undisclosed	WIN
12	Conejo	"Perro Fiel" by Shakira ft. Nicky Jam	undisclosed	RISK

=== Week 4 (September 15) ===
- Group number: "Mamma Mia" by ABBA
- Group number: "Gasolina" by Daddy Yankee

Performances on the fourth episode
#	Stage name	Song	Identity	Result
1	Minotauro	"Despacito" by Luis Fonsi	undisclosed	SAFE
2	Conejo	"Chandelier" by Sia	undisclosed	SAFE
3	Catrina	"¡Basta Ya!" by Jenni Rivera	Rocío Banquells	OUT
4	Camaleón	"Te Presumo" by Banda el Recodo	undisclosed	SAFE
5	Zorro	"Calma" by Pedro Capó	undisclosed	SAFE
6	Marciano	"Suavemente" by Elvis Crespo	undisclosed	SAFE
7	Monstruo	"Havana" by Camila Cabello	undisclosed	RISK
8	Gato	"Prófugos" by Soda Stereo	undisclosed	SAFE
9	Lechuza	"Volverte a Amar" by Alejandra Guzmán	undisclosed	SAFE
10	Cebra	"Reggaetón Lento (Bailemos)" by CNCO	undisclosed	SAFE

=== Week 5 (September 22) ===
Performances on the fifth episode
#	Stage name	Song	Identity	Result
1	Gato	"Cómo Te Voy A Olvidar" by Los Ángeles Azules	Ilse Olivo	OUT
2	Cebra	"Uptown Funk" by Mark Ronson ft. Bruno Mars	undisclosed	SAFE
3	Monstruo	"Él Me Mintió" by Amanda Miguel	undisclosed	SAFE
4	Marciano	"El Amante" by Nicky Jam	undisclosed	RISK
5	Camaleón	"Shallow" by Lady Gaga ft. Bradley Cooper	undisclosed	SAFE
6	Minotauro	"Mientes" by Camila	undisclosed	SAFE
7	Conejo	"I Was Made for Lovin' You" by Kiss	undisclosed	SAFE
8	Zorro	"Mientes Tan Bien" by Sin Bandera	undisclosed	RISK
9	Lechuza	"Sin Pijama" by Becky G and Natti Natasha	undisclosed	SAFE

=== Week 6 (September 29) ===
Performances on the sixth episode
#	Stage name	Song	Identity	Result
1	Cebra	"Mia" by Bad Bunny ft. Drake	undisclosed	SAFE
2	Camaleón	"This Is Me" by Keala Settle	undisclosed	SAFE
3	Zorro	"Prometiste" by Pepe Aguilar	undisclosed	RISK
4	Conejo	"Te Hubieras Ido Antes" by Julión Álvarez	undisclosed	SAFE
5	Monstruo	"Azul" by Cristian Castro	undisclosed	SAFE
6	Lechuza	"Regresame Mi Corazón" by Carlos Rivera	undisclosed	SAFE
7	Marciano	"Propuesta Indecente" by Romeo Santos	José Manuel Figueroa	OUT
8	Minotauro	"We Are the Champions" by Queen	undisclosed	SAFE

=== Week 7 (October 6) ===
Performances on the seventh episode
#	Stage name	Song	Identity	Result
Round One
1	Minotauro	"La Mordidita" by Ricky Martin ft. Yotuel	Alan Ibarra	OUT
2	Cebra	"Get Lucky" by Daft Punk ft. Pharrell Williams	undisclosed	SAFE
3	Conejo	"Single Ladies (Put a Ring on It)" by Beyoncé	undisclosed	RISK
4	Monstruo	"Falsas Esperanzas" by Christina Aguilera	undisclosed	SAFE
5	Zorro	"It's My Life" by Bon Jovi	undisclosed	SAFE
6	Camaleón	"Karma Chameleon" by Culture Club	undisclosed	SAFE
7	Lechuza	"El Amor Coloca" by María José	undisclosed	SAFE
Round Two
8	Camaleón	"Ingrata" by Café Tacuba	undisclosed	SAFE
9	Zorro	"Robarte un Beso" by Carlos Vives and Sebastián Yatra	Regina Blandón	OUT
10	Cebra	"X" by Nicky Jam and J Balvin	undisclosed	RISK
11	Lechuza	"Vivir Mi Vida" by Marc Anthony	undisclosed	SAFE
12	Conejo	"To My Love" by Bomba Estéreo	undisclosed	SAFE
13	Monstruo	"Libre Soy" from Frozen	undisclosed	SAFE

=== Week 8 (October 13) – Finale ===
- Group number: "Don't Stop the Party" by Pitbull
- Guest performance: "Baby Girl" performed by Mario Bautista

Performances on the final episode
#	Stage name	Song	Identity	Result
Round One
1	Monstruo	"Livin' la Vida Loca" by Ricky Martin	Michelle Rodríguez	OUT
2	Cebra	"Party Rock Anthem" by LMFAO	undisclosed	SAFE
3	Conejo	"Todos Me Miran" by Gloria Trevi	Natalia Sosa	OUT
4	Camaleón	"Don't Stop Me Now" by Queen	undisclosed	SAFE
5	Lechuza	"Ángel" by Yuridia	undisclosed	SAFE
Round Two
6	Camaleón	"Me Muero" by Carlos Rivera	Vadhir Derbez	WINNER
7	Cebra	"Me Lloras" by Gloria Trevi	Mario Bautista	THIRD
8	Lechuza	"Una Mentira Más" by Yuri and Natalia Jiménez	Patricia Manterola	RUNNER-UP

== Ratings ==
Show	Episode	Air date	Timeslot (CT)	Viewers (millions)
1	"Ciervo y Gallo acaban con el misterio"	August 25, 2019	Sunday; 8:30 p.m.	4.0
2	"¡Abejorro y Panda a punto de revelar su identidad!"	September 1, 2019	Sunday; 8:30 p.m.	4.3
3	"Dos celebridades más al descubierto"	September 8, 2019	Sunday; 8:30 p.m.	4.5
4	"La competencia toma un giro inesperado"	September 15, 2019	Sunday; 8:00 p.m.	2.6
5	"Una nueva identidad ha quedado revelada"	September 22, 2019	Sunday; 8:30 p.m.	3.9
6	"Sin pistas, el misterio crece más"	September 29, 2019	Sunday; 8:30 p.m.	3.7
7	"¡Los finalistas ya están definidos!"	October 6, 2019	Sunday; 8:30 p.m.	4.4
8	"El misterio terminó"	October 13, 2019	Sunday; 8:30 p.m.	5.3
