= Northampton (album) =

Live album by Enter the Haggis
- Released: May 18, 2007
- Genre: Folk rock
- Label: UFO Music
- Producer: Enter the Haggis, Zach McNees

Enter the Haggis chronology
Soapbox Heroes	Northampton	Gutter Anthems

Northampton is the 6th album and 2nd official live album for Enter the Haggis. It became available May 4, 2007. It is the third album on their current label, UFO Music (United for Opportunity), and was produced by the band and Zach McNees.

The album was recorded entirely live at the Iron Horse Music Hall in Northampton, Massachusetts on March 9 and 10, 2007.

The band had performed at Iron Horse Music Hall several times in the past, and so could count on sold out shows. Four shows were scheduled, two each night. The first three shows featured identical set lists, which became the album tracks listed below. Since satisfactory recordings of all songs were obtained the first three shows, the band was able to play some other songs the fourth show.

CDs were just sold at concert venues before the official release date of June 5, 2007. It is now available through usual channels, including the iTunes Store.

== Track listing ==
1. "One Last Drink"
2. "No More Stones"
3. "Fiddle Set"
4. "Another Round"
5. "Cynical"
6. "Marti's Last Stand"
7. "New Monthly Flavour"
8. "Lancaster Gate"
9. "The Apothecary"
10. "What I've Done"
11. "Long Way Home"
12. "Congress"
13. "Gasoline"
14. "Twirling Towards Freedom"
15. "Down With The Ship"
16. "Outtakes" (iTunes Exclusive)

== Production ==
- Producer - Enter the Haggis, Zach McNees
- Engineer & Mixing - Zach McNees
- Mastering - Ricardo Gutierrez
- Assistant Engineer - Rosco, Tim Price
- Additional Editing - Tim Price
- Mobile Recording - MetroRemote
- System Engineers - Pete Peloquin, Ben Chandler
- System Crew - Jeff Beauregard, Mike Sculz, Josh Hurley
- Front of House and Intro - Lazlo
