= Entre correr y vivir =

- Genre: Drama
- Written by: Gloria Bautista; Adrián Mazoy; Gibrán Portela; Marcelo Tobar
- Directed by: Raúl Quintanilla
- Starring: Vadhir Derbez; Diego Amozurrutia; Alejandro Camacho; Sofía Sisniega
- Country of origin: Mexico
- Original language: Spanish
- No. of seasons: 1
- No. of episodes: 40

Production
- Executive producer: Julián Antuñano

Original release
- Network: Azteca 7
- Release: October 22 – December 22, 2016

Entre correr y vivir, is a Mexican telenovela produced by Julián Antuñano for Azteca 7. The series premiered on October 22, 2016, is also available on the Blim platform. The series is based on the lives of the brothers Ricardo and Pedro Rodríguez de la Vega, famous drivers of the Formula 1 in the 60's.

The series is starring Vadhir Derbez as Rodrigo Hernández, Diego Amozurrutia as Guillermo Aldana, Alejandro Camacho as Mateo and Sofía Sisniega as Camila.

== Cast ==
- Vadhir Derbez as Rodrigo Hernández
- Diego Amozurrutia as Guillermo Aldana
- Alejandro Camacho as Mateo
- Sofía Sisniega as Camila
- Erika de la Rosa as Angelina
- Javier Díaz Dueñas as Don Pedro
- Luciana Silveyra as Ximena
- Laura Montijano as Eva
- Armando Hernández as Diesel
- Juan Pablo Castañeda as Pedro Rodríguez
- Mauricio Garza as Ricardo Rodriguez
- Germán Valdés III as Lalo
- Tony Marcín as Norma
