= Moring =

Moring may refer to:

- Bill Moring (born 1958), American jazz bassist
- Hennie Möring, Dutch footballer
- Ivo Moring (born 1971), German music producer and songwriter
- József Attila Móring, Hungarian educator and politician
- Karsten Möring (born 1949), German politician
- Marcel Möring (born 1957), Dutch writer
- Werner Moring, German cross-country skier

== See also ==
- Crowell & Moring, international law firm headquartered in Washington, D.C.
- Mooring (disambiguation)
