= Vadhir Derbez =

Mexican actor

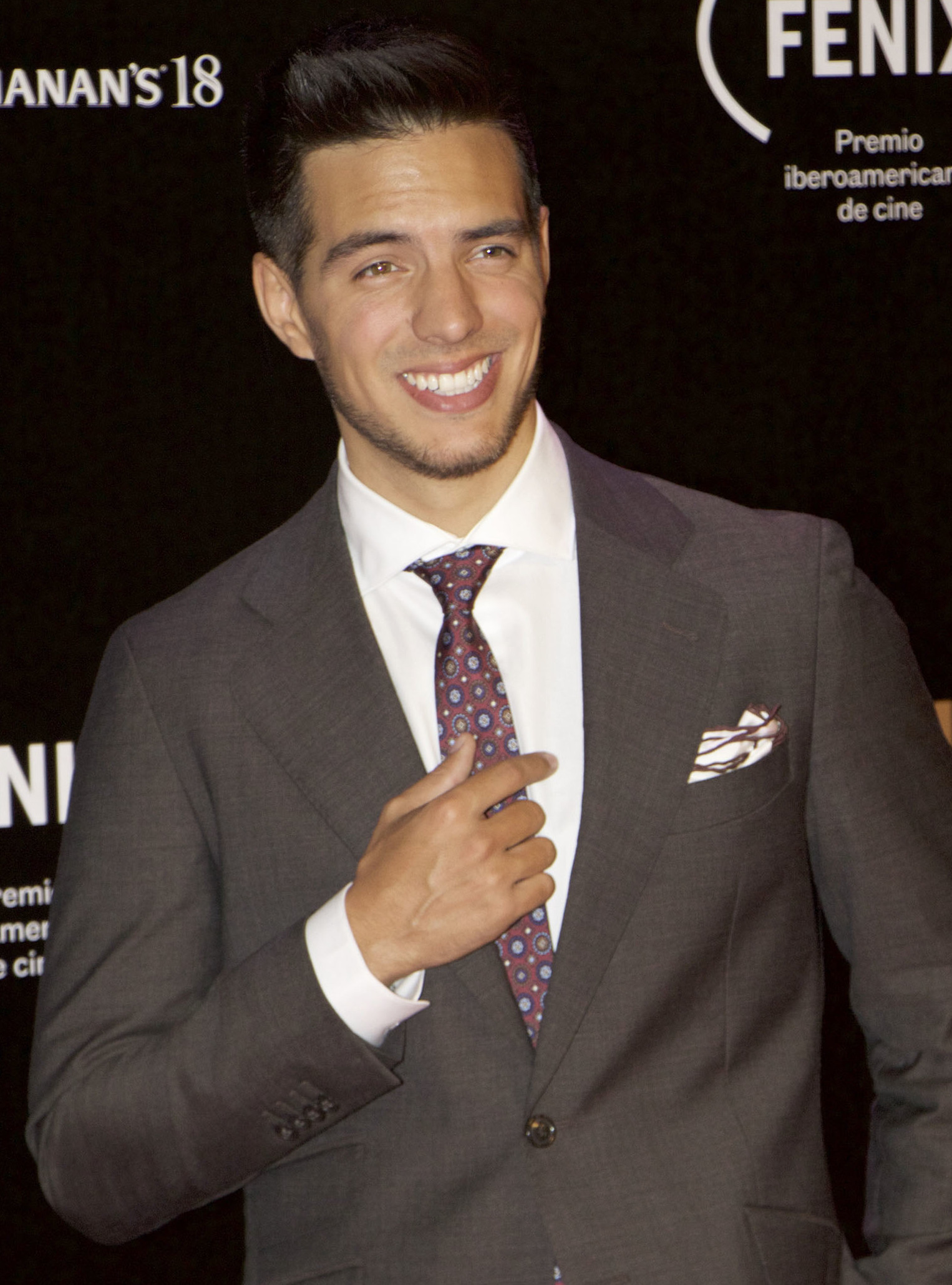
- Derbez in 2018
- Born: Vadhir Derbez Alejandro González Torres; 18 February 1991 (age 35); Mexico City, Mexico
- Education: Culver Academies
- Occupation: Actor
- Years active: 1994–present
- Parents: Eugenio Derbez (father); Silvana Prince (mother)

Vadhir Derbez Alejandro González Torres (born 18 February 1991) is a Mexican actor and singer who has worked for Televisa, Univision, Warner Brothers, Netflix, TV Azteca and Telemundo.

== Personal life ==
Derbez was born in Mexico City. His father is comic actor Eugenio Derbez.

He studied at military school Culver Academies for four years, where he practiced equestrianism. He rode in Barack Obama's Inaugural parade in Washington D.C. in 2008.

== Career ==
=== Television ===
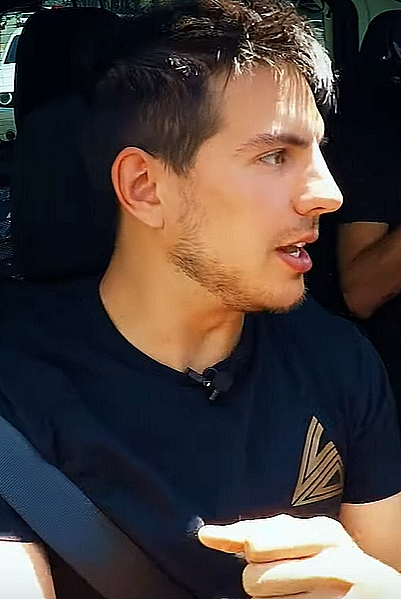
Derbez in 2019

Vadhir began his acting career in 1997 at age six on the program Derbez en Cuando, where he participated in the sketches Tatiana y En Familia con Chabelo (2000), and Diseñador do ambos sexos (2001). He earned his first featured part in the novela (soap opera) Cómplices Al Rescate (2002). La familia P. Luche (2002) was his next involved work, followed by De pocas, pocas pulgas (2003), Par de ases (2004), Mujer, Casos de la Vida Real (2004). In 2006 he was on the famous program Vecinos as recurring character Marco López Pérez for a total of 36 episodes.

Derbez participated in Univision's first reality dance competition, Mira Quien Baila (2010) and was the winner of the shows first season. On November 21, 2010, he won first place in Mira Quien Baila: First Season. He acted in the famous series Gossip Girl: Acapulco (2013) as Maximiliano 'Max' Zaga, one of the protagonists, alongside Alexis Ayala, José María Torre, and Issabela Camil.

In 2016, Vadhir played the role of César Suárez, the psychopathic son of a drug lord in the soap opera La querida del Centauro, a production of Sony Pictures, Teleset, and in collaboration with Telemundo, the show was aired in the United States, Mexico, and South America. In the same year the actor played a lead role in the first series shared amongst TV Azteca and Televisa Blim, Entre correr y vivir, based on the lives of Ricardo and Pedro Rodríguez. This show was filmed in the race course of Mexico City and in it Vadhir played the role of the race pilot Rodrigo Hernández. In 2019, he won the first season of ¿Quién es la máscara? as Camaleon.

Entering the international market, the actor obtained a role on the Netflix series, Sense8 (2016) alongside Miguel Ángel Silvestre and Alfonso Herrera.

=== Theatre ===
The actor made his theater debut playing Tom Sawyer, the lead role in Las aventuras de Tom Sawyer (2004), an adaption of the story by Mark Twain. In 2013 he took part in the musical Grease, playing 3 different roles (Tacho, Kiko, and Danny Sucko) during this time. Afterwards he earned a lead part in the Broadway musical Rock of Ages (2014), playing the role of Jerry, along with the actress and singer Dulce Maria. He then played a lead role in Grease (2017) once more on Musical USA making rounds in a few cities in the United States.

=== Film ===
Vadhir earned his first part on the big screen giving voice to the character Chuletas in the 2005 animated film Imaginum, but it wasn not until 2015 that he had a role in a live-action film, appearing in the action film Ladrones, alongside Fernando Colunga, Eduardo Yáñez, Jessica Lindsay, and Miguel Varoni. In 2016, he obtained his first lead role in film El tamaño si Importa, directed by Rafa Lara. The next year he was in the film 3 Idiotas, an adaptation of the popular Bollywood film 3 Idiots. After his success in Mexico, he made his Hollywood debut in the film How to Be a Latin Lover (2017), playing a younger version of the character played by his father Eugenio. In May 2019, Vadhir co-starred as Beto in the comedy film Dulce familia.

=== Music ===
Derbez made his music debut with his first EP, Vadhir Derbez released 2 September 2016. It featured two singles: "Te Olvidé" and "Me Haces Sentir". "Me Haces Sentir" was later re-released on 14 February 2017 with the live version included.

His musical and cinematic career briefly overlapped his song "Al Final" was released under the soundtrack of 3 Idiots on 7 March 2017, a movie which he was also featured on April 27, 2017, Derbez released his fourth single, "Latin Lover".

After a period of almost two years, Vadhir released his next single "Mala" on 5 April 2019, and has announced that his last song "Toda La Banda" was released in June 2019.

== Filmography ==
=== Film ===
Year	Title	Role	Notes
2005	Imaginum	Chuletas	Animated film
2015	Ladrones	Ray	
2016	El tamaño sí importa	Diego Suárez	
2017	3 idiotas	Isidoro	
2017	How to Be a Latin Lover	Maximo (Age 21)	
2019	Como si fuera la primera vez	Diego	
2019	Breaking the I.C.E.	Alejandro	Short film
2019	Dulce familia	Beto	
2020	Veinteañera: Divorciada y fantástica	Juanpa	
2020	El mesero	Rodrigo	
2021	The Seventh Day	Father Daniel Garcia	
2021	The Mooring	Daniel	
2022	White Elephant	Carlos Garcia	
2022	Huevitos congelados	Pingüino Rey	Animated film

=== Television roles ===
Year	Title	Role	Notes
2001–2005	Mujer, casos de la vida real	Various roles	3 episodes
2002	Cómplices al rescate	Andrés Rosales	
2003	De pocas, pocas pulgas	Chorizo	
2005	Par de Ases	Various roles	
2005–2006	Vecinos	Marco López	36 episodes
2010	Eva Luna	Gerardo	
2012	El Gran Show de los Peques	Producción	Episode: "Quinto episodio"
2013	Gossip Girl: Acapulco	Maximiliano "Max" Zaga	26 episodes
2016	Entre correr y vivir	Rodrigo Hernández	Main role
2016–2017	La querida del Centauro	César Suárez	Recurring role; 44 episodes (season 1), 2 episodes (season 2)
2016	Sense8	Mr.Valles (student)	Episode: "Happy F*cking New Year"
2019	¿Quién es la máscara?	Camaleón	
2019	De viaje con los Derbez	Himself	
2020	The First Team	Carlos Velez	

== Discography ==
=== Albums ===
EP

- Vadhir Derbez (2016)

=== Singles ===
- "Me Haces Sentir" (2016)
- "Te Olvide" (2016)
- "Al Final" (2016)
- "Latin Lover" (2017)
- "Mala" (2019)
- "Toda La Banda" (2019)
- "Where You At" feat. Roxy & Ekin (2020)
- "Buena Suerte" feat. Mario Bautista & Yera (2020)
- "Luna" feat. Ir Sais (2021)
- "Te Confieso" feat. Ximena Sariñana (2021)
- "Mi Soledad" with Ezio Oliva (2021)
- "Back To Love" with Chilz (2022)
- "Hasta Que Se Acaba el Mundo" (2022)
- "Que Pasaría" feat. Paty Cantú (2022)

=== Soundtracks ===
- Cómplices al Rescate (2001)
- De Pocas Pocas Pulgas (2003)
