= Huevitos congelados =

- Release poster
- Directed by: Gabriel Riva Palacio Alatriste; Rodolfo Riva Palacio Alatriste
- Written by: Gabriel Riva Palacio Alatriste; Rodolfo Riva Palacio Alatriste
- Produced by: Ignacio Martínez Casares; Gabriel Riva Palacio Alatriste; Rodolfo Riva Palacio Alatriste
- Starring: Bruno Bichir; Maite Perroni; Angélica Vale; Carlos Espejel; Miguel Rodarte; Arath de la Torre; Mauricio Castillo; Vadhir Derbez
- Edited by: Gabriel Riva Palacio Alatriste; Rodolfo Riva Palacio Alatriste; Daniela "Güera" Rodríguez; R. Edgardo Ávalos Cuenca
- Music by: Zacarías M. de la Riva
- Production companies: Huevocartoon Producciones; Odin's Eye Animation; Videocine; Televisa
- Distributed by: ViX
- Release date: December 14, 2022
- Running time: 91 minutes
- Country: Mexico
- Language: Spanish
- Box office: $1.02 million

Huevitos Congelados (formerly Un gallo congelado) is a 2022 Mexican animated adventure comedy film written, directed and co-produced by Gabriel & Rodolfo Riva Palacio Alatriste. It is the sequel to the 2021 film Un Rescate de Huevitos and the fifth and final installment of the Huevos series and a soft reboot. It was released exclusively on streaming as a ViX original on December 14, 2022. Internationally, it was released as Little Eggs: A Frozen Rescue and in some countries as A Frozen Adventure.

== Plot ==
At the South Pole, Rockhopper penguins were snowboarding and throwing a party. However, a trio of pirates in their ship disrupted it and kidnapped a polar bear cub named Polito, from his parents, along with 3 penguin brothers. The penguin and polar bear tribes were forced to migrate due to the crack from the ship.

Meanwhile, in the "Granjas el Pollon", shortly after the events of the fourth film, the eggs and animals were relaxing and playing near the pond. At one point, Max and Uly wanted their father, Toto, to play with them, but explained his busy schedule as an excuse. But then, his egg friends, Confi and Willy, convinced him to play with his children. Di, Mama Gallina, and Bibi discuss about childhood and parenting. Mama Gallina later revealed that she is sick. Later that night, Don Poncho informed the gang of a poster for the polar bear that owner Abuelita has received and told stories about polar bears.

The next day, Abuelita and Chucho went to the circus where the Barba pirates, Roja, Jan, and Negra, put on a show with the kidnapped animals. They struggled to keep the animals from the Inspector due to Mexican law, not knowing they escaped. Later that night, Polito, and the penguin brothers, Antonio, Venancio, and Manolo, head to the ranch where Toto and family tried to hide them in Abuelita's fridge. Suddenly, Toto was informed that his mother was dying. Before her death, she had Toto promise her to return Polito to the South Pole, which he accepted. She died peacefully.

Later that morning, Toto and his family stowed away with Polito and penguins in Abuelita's cargo trailer, where they were chased by the Barba pirates. After defeating them, Toto's gang made it to the beach where they take a boat and sail off. Meanwhile, the pirates steal a GPS to track down the boat.

Upon arrival, Toto and gang ventured through an ice cave. After reaching the other side, Polito searched for his parents, but couldn't find them. Suddenly, a trio of killer whales appears, and Toto fought back. They then hiked through the icy mountain and crossed a bridge and made it to the other side. However, fearing for his family, Toto destroyed the bridge, leaving them and went forward on his own.

While climbing the icy mountain, Toto heard Polito's parents calling for him, and attempted to reach them when a blizzard pushed Toto into the caverns. Trapped and unable to escape, Toto remembered his family and friends, tearfully confessing and admitting his mistakes. Unbeknownst to him, Di and family were next to him, separated by an ice block. She fought a walrus to brake the barrier, freeing Toto. He was revived by his family, apologizing to them. Finally, they team up together to reunite Polito to his parents. Unfortunately, the Barba pirates caught up and tried to reclaim Polito, causing another major crack.

Toto, the family, and the penguins fought back against the pirates and the killer whales. Just when Polito was about to fall into the killer whales, Toto and family held on to him, but lost grip. The penguin brothers fought and defeated the killer whales, and Toto became unconscious. But then, he was revived by Polito's father with his hot fur.

Celebrating a victory, as the penguins threw a party, Bibi and Willy adopted a cracked penguin egg, Toto's family took the ship back home, and Di sang a song.

In the mid-credit scene, Tlacua and Cuache, who were lost at sea, unknowingly arrived at the South Pole where two sea lions played with them. In the post-credit scene, the Inspector informed the Barba pirates that he terminated their circus license due to abandonment, and the orcas surrounded them.

== Voice cast ==
- Bruno Bichir as Toto, a caring, brave, short-tempered, humble rooster who is Di's husband and Max and Uly's father.
- Maite Perroni as Di, a loving, encouraging, brave hen who's Toto's wife, and Max and Uly's mother.
- Carlos Espejel as Willy, a mentally-stabled chicken egg who is Toto's best friend and Bibi's girlfriend.
- Miguel Rodarte as Barba Roja, the leader of the Barba pirates who hosted a circus after kidnapping Polito and the penguins. He is fierce and commands orders.
- Arath de la Torre as Barba Jan, a chubby and cowardly member of the Barba pirates with one leg. He is scatterbrained.
- Mauricio Castillo as Barba Negra, a pirate who wears an eye patch and in charge of handling weaponry.
- Dione Riva Palacio Santacruz as Uly, a playful chick who is Toto and Di's daughter and Max's twin sister.
- Oliver Díaz Barba as Max, a playful chick who is Toto and Di's son and Uly's twin brother.
- Marcelo Barceló as Polito, a polar bear cub who was snatched away from his parents in the South Pole, and whom Toto made a promise to reunite him.
- Juan Frese as Papá Oso, Polito's father who later revived Toto with his warm fur.
- Mónica Santacruz as Mamá Osa, Polito's mother who worries for her son.
- María Alicia Delgado as Abuelita, an elderly woman and owner of "Granjas el Pollon".
- Claudio Herrera as Cartero, the ranch's mailman.
- Humberto Vélez as Inspector, a short man who constantly threatened to revoke the Barba pirates' circus license.
- Héctor Lee as Brody, the seagull captain.
- Rodolfo Riva Palacio Alatriste as:
  - Antonio, a young Rockhopper penguin
  - Cuache, an easy-going opossum.
  - Don Fidencio, a blind, but trustworthy Bloodhound.
- Gabriel Riva Palacio Alatriste as:
  - Confi, a goofball Cascarón egg
  - Venancio, Antonio's brother
  - Dodo, the Inspector's pet dodo.
- Fernando Meza as:
  - Manolo, Antonio and Venancio's brother.
  - Tlacua, a short-tempered opossum.
- Lulú Morán as Mamá Gallina, Toto's loving mother, Di's step-mother, and Max and Uly's grandmother who later died of illness.
- Pepe Lavat as Don Poncho, a retired rooster boxer, Di's father, Toto's father-in-law, and Max and Uly's grandfather
- Angélica Vale as Bibi, an acrobatic egg originally from the fair. She's revealed to be a Cascarón egg.
- Vadhir Derbez as Pingüino Rey, a Rockhopper penguin that throws parties at the South Pole.

== Production ==
=== Development ===
After the success of Un gallo con muchos huevos, Huevocartoon directors and co-founders, Gabriel and Rodolfo Riva Alatriste, has announced two more films to the franchise. "After the success of [Un gallo], we sat down with the people from Videocine and the first thing we told them was that we wanted to continue with two more films[...]," Rodolfo said during an interview.

The film was first announced in 2018, alongside Un rescate de huevitos, and would be released in 2022 afterwards. Miguel Rodarte and Arath de la Torre were also reported to join the voice cast as antagonists. It was originally titled as Un gallo congelado. Gabriel Riva suggested the film would be the final installment to the Huevos film series, noting the life cycle changes of all films leading up to Congelados. "Now with [Huevitos congelados] everything is closed. When we did the fifth[...] up to there, we can't think of anything else. Thus, [the fifth is] the closing of cycles, [which] is something very dramatic," said Gabriel.

During an interview with Excélsior, Rodolfo and Gabriel Riva explained the process of the film, reflecting on the franchise's history and successes. Rodolfo said that he's "very proud of what [has been] achieved". He explained that a challenge was to compete with the Hollywood industry and match the same level of quality while produced with a low budget. "[W]e went out to compete with Hollywood[...] and the people[...] expect a level of quality," said Rodolfo. "[...]but they have at least [$70 million] and we don't even have ten percent. So delivering a product at that level, that the audience feels proud to say that the film is Mexican, that it entertains them, [and] that it doesn't ask for anything from Hollywood, are [things] that make us proud." Rodolfo's brother and co-director Gabriel Riva has explained the animation process of the film, ensuring the highest quality for the entire franchise with Congelados. "Although I take credit as director, we really have a person there [-] Alberto Juárez (CG supervisor)[...] is an absolute genius," said Gabriel. "In [CG films,] it's a balance between [rendering] and quality. What defines quality is the render and we didn't have it. We worked with a good team in order to reach the necessary quality." Gabriel continued to elaborate on the process, calling it "brutal" and "a technological challenge" and admitted to pushing the rendering department "too hard" in an effort to reach the intended quality. "[T]hey are the geniuses who achieved that texture and that they obtained that quality and that detail in the feathers or in the hair of the bears." Gabriel additionally stressed about the impact for each film completed, saying "[t]he great pain for us is that every time we finish a film, the artists end up with a great level, but since there are few productions in Mexico, unfortunately there is a brain drain." He even mentioned that people joked about Huevocartoon being a learning facility for animation in Mexico. The film had been in development for four years.

In a separate interview, the filmmakers mentioned that they ensured the highest quality of the film, reflecting on the past installments in all aspects of development and messages, and calling it "an important process". "For us it is the best film in terms of animation, sound, story and the most important message that needs to be strengthened right now is the family, the issue of family union is addressed and all the characters go in that direction," said Rodolfo. He called it "a breakthrough in [series'] animation".

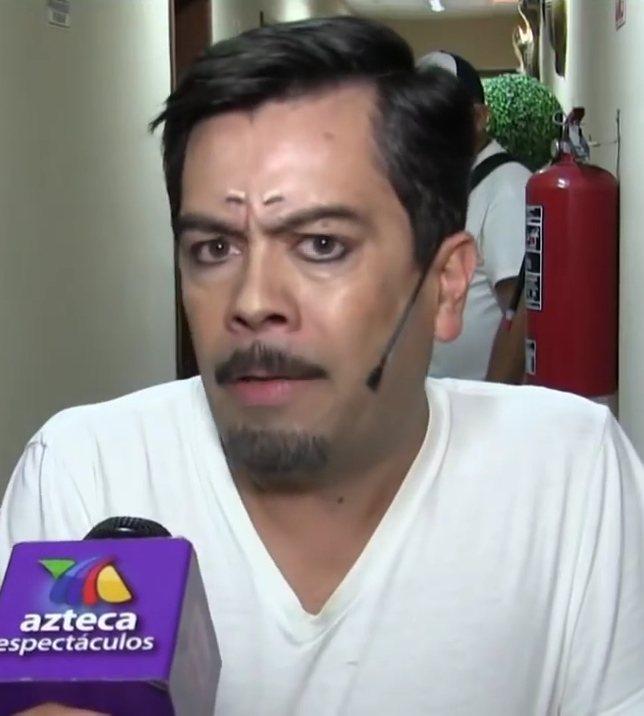
Carlos Espejel, voice of Willy, reflected on the franchise's evolution and processing, saying it is he's "most proud of" and calling it "fun".

Carlos Espejel, the series' Spanish voice of Willy, also commented on the franchise's evolution, mentioning how certain films have released during pandemics. "We managed to make the first film[,] and then the second one already had a more sophisticated animation," said Espejel. "[...]but we had the first influenza pandemic, which was overcome[,] and these last two installments were also overcome[...] with the Covid in the middle." Espejel also explained about the financial statuses of Mexican animation projects, such as the Huevos films. "In Mexico, animated films were not made, so nobody wanted to invest in that," said Espejel. “This movie is 100% Mexican and this project started very small[...] This is a project that started with a very small budget[...] but these guys [Gabriel and Rodolfo] ventured[,] did the feat[,] and achieved great success." Gabriel Riva also weighed in on the status of Mexican animation at the time of the first film, saying "One had dreams of positioning animation in Mexico and when the time came we thought that hopefully it would do decently well and it turned out that we had the highest grossing weekend in history and you don't know how to receive that news. [...] It's amazing!" Further detailing the film's process, Gabriel said that he's "fascinated by the level the film has reached", as well as "highlighting the talent of Mexico". The filmmakers also had to change jokes due to the edgy nature of Huevocartoon, and to fit in a timely manner. "You cannot be a gold coin because someone is always going to be offended, but we have tried to evolve, understand what happens in society and be attentive to new roles," said Rodolfo. "There are some jokes that could be out of tune, which is why we always do constant script readings, focus groups. This tape was made four years ago and something that was good at the time, not today anymore, but we changed some jokes to lighten it up".

=== Casting ===
The film's original Spanish voice cast consist of returning actors, while joined by Miguel Rodarte, Arath de la Torre, Mauricio Castillo, and Vadhir Derbez. The film was once more dedicated to José Lavat and Lourdes "Lulú" Morán, who reprised their roles as Don Poncho and Mamá Gallina, respectively.

Carlos Espejel, voice of Willy, expressed enjoyment of the film, saying that "It's a fun film, with many adventures, with this double discourse that 'the eggs' have always had". He said that he's "very proud to be in [the] project".

Mauricio Castillo, the voice of antagonist Barba Negra, has said that he "[felt] very proud that they called me because it is the first time that I have made [a] Huevocartoon film." He stated that he worked on numerous films and seven Spanish dubs, but that it is the actor's first time doing "a voice from the ground up, where there's nothing yet and from that the animation is created". "I'm very grateful to be a part [of...] a huge and high quality project. This film is a great achievement and a great success for the Mexican industry at this level of animation," Castillo elaborated.

=== Music ===
Zacarías M. de la Riva, the composer of the previous two entries, returned to provide the score for the film. The soundtrack was performed and recorded in Budapest.

== Release ==
The film was released digitally exclusively on the ViX service, in contrast to previous theatrically released entries. It was also released alongside on sister platform Pantaya in limited release.

Rodolfo Riva explained the release following the COVID-19's impact, as well as the restructuring of the company. "We are in a process of restructuring the company and part of that is defining what is family content and what is content for adolescents and adults[.] Definitely the times and the pandemic led us to see these streaming systems[...] they developed, there was a boom, and that's where it's happening now[;] the audience is moving there, so, that's where we're going," he said.

== Future ==
A spin-off film focused on Confi, is reportedly in development.
