= Soapbox Heroes =

Studio album by Enter the Haggis
- Released: July 18, 2006
- Genre: Folk rock
- Label: UFO Music
- Producer: Neil Dorfsman

Enter the Haggis chronology
Casualties of Retail	Soapbox Heroes	Northampton

Soapbox Heroes is Canadian folk rock band Enter the Haggis's 5th album. It was released on July 18, 2006. Soapbox Heroes is the second album on their current label, UFO Music (United for Opportunity), and was produced by Neil Dorfsman. It was widely greeted by fans and goes mostly under the genre of Celtic Rock.

The album was recorded at The Clubhouse Studio in Rhinebeck, New York, U.S., and mixed at Saint Claire Recording Company in Lexington, Kentucky, U.S.

== Track listing ==
1. Lancaster Gate
2. One Last Drink
3. New Monthly Flavour
4. The Apothecary
5. Cynical
6. The Barfly
7. No More Stones
8. Perfect Song
9. Marti's Last Stand
10. Long Way Home

== Personnel ==
Enter The Haggis

- Mark Abraham - Bass, Mandolin, and Backing Vocals
- Brian Buchanan - Vocals, Fiddles, Piano, B-3, Synthesizer, Wurlitzer, Electric Guitar, and Acoustic Guitar
- James Campbell - Drums, and Percussion
- Craig Downie - Lead Vocals on "Marti's Last Stand", Backing Vocals, Highland Bagpipes, Electronic Redpipes, Tin Whistles, and Harmonicas
- Trevor Lewington - Vocals, Lead Electric Guitar, and Acoustic Guitar

Additional Musicians

- Anthony Giles - Tabla Drums, Timbales, and Conga Drums
- Rob Turner - Cello on "The Barfly"
