= Enter the Haggis =

Canadian Celtic rock band

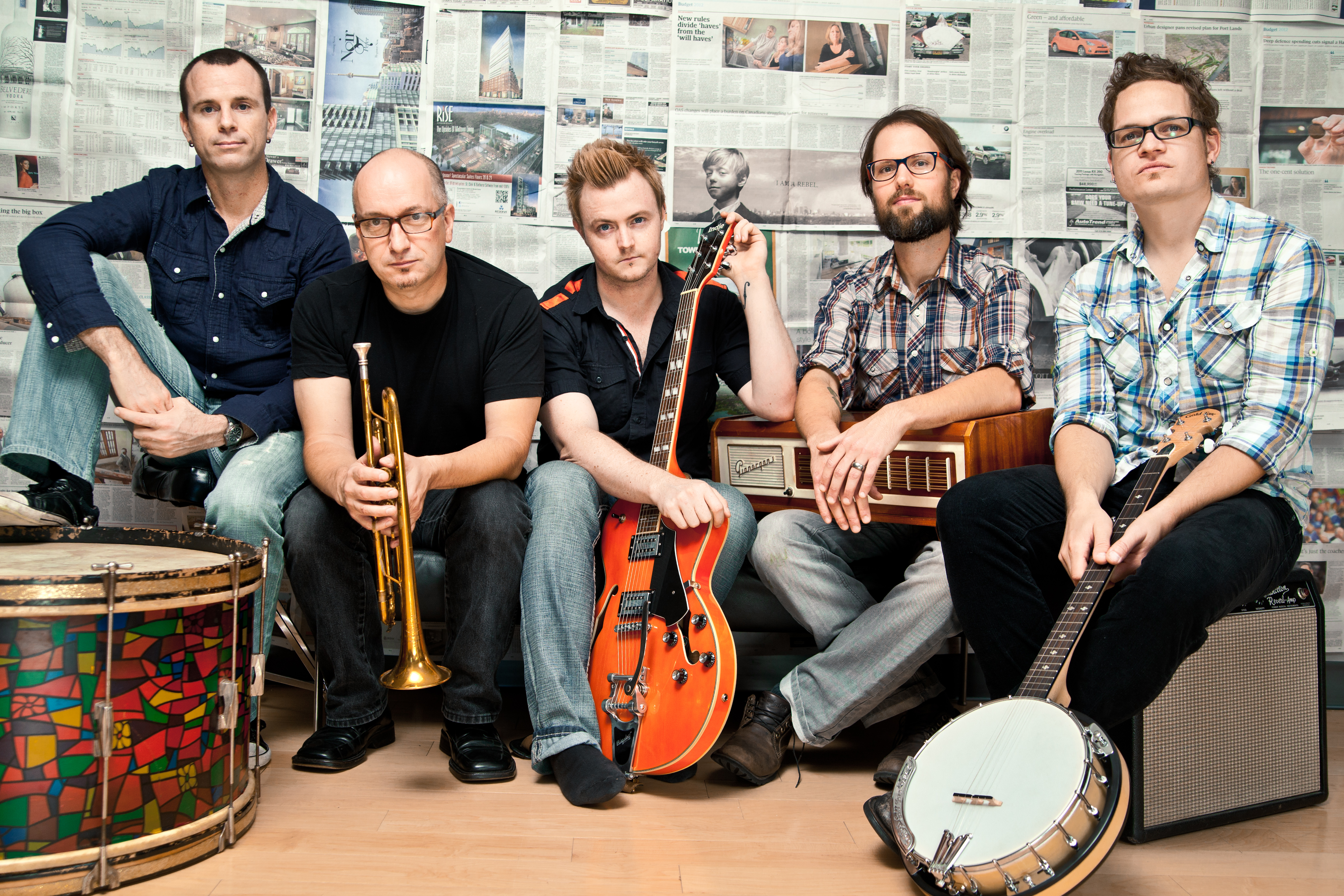
- Enter the Haggis in 2012. From left to right: Bruce McCarthy, Craig Downie, Brian Buchanan, Trevor Lewington, and Mark Abraham

Background information
- Also known as: Jubilee Riots
- Origin: Toronto, Ontario, Canada
- Genres: Celtic rock Folk rock Indie rock Roots rock
- Years active: 1995 - present
- Labels: Firebrand Entertainment; United For Opportunity
- Members: Craig Downie; Brian Buchanan; Trevor Lewington; Rose Baldino; Caroline Browning; Tom Barraco
- Past members: Mark Abraham; Duncan Cameron; James Campbell; Ken Horne; Bruce McCarthy; Rob McCrady; Owen Pallett; Tom Paterson; Donald Quan
- Website: www.enterthehaggis.com

Enter the Haggis is a Canadian Celtic rock band based in Toronto. The band was founded in 1995 by Craig Downie, the only remaining original member in the lineup, which currently consists of Downie (highland bagpipes, vocals), Brian Buchanan (vocals, fiddle, guitar), Trevor Lewington (vocals, guitar), Caroline Browning (bass), and Tom Barraco (drums). For about a year, starting in late 2014, they recorded and performed under the name Jubilee Riots, and released their eighth studio album Penny Black under that name, before returning to the original name.

== History ==
=== Formation and early years ===
Craig Downie was born in Scotland and raised in Canada. He started playing bagpipes when he joined a pipe band at 12 years old. After pursuing an acting career in the early 1990s, Downie formed Enter the Haggis in Toronto in 1995 shortly before the band's first performance. The name was chosen as a humorous reference to the 1973 kung-fu film Enter the Dragon.

The band's first album, Let the Wind Blow High, was independently released in 1998. Their next was ETH Live! which, on its website, the band says was "recorded over three nights at the end of an insane pub tour in 2001." That was followed, also in 2002, by Aerials, which was the first studio release with the lineup consisting of Downie, Buchanan, Lewington, Abraham, and drummer James Campbell. This lineup would remain unchanged until Campbell's departure in 2010 (he left to become an air traffic controller).

=== Increased following ===
In July 2003, the band played to 20,000 people at the annual Mayor's Cup Festival in Plattsburgh, New York. At the show, the band was approached with the offer to film a live show for release as a PBS special. In December of that year, they recorded two shows at Plattsburgh State University's Hartman Theater. The result, Live at Lanigan's Ball, was released on DVD and to PBS and aired on many stations across the US.

Enter the Haggis' third studio album Casualties of Retail was released in 2005, on Firebrand Entertainment. It was followed by Soapbox Heroes in 2006, and Gutter Anthems in 2009, both on the United for Opportunity record label.

In 2006, the band performed two songs on the A&E show Breakfast with the Arts: "Gasoline" from Casualties of Retail and "One Last Drink" from Soapbox Heroes.

In March 2007, the band performed on Live with Regis and Kelly, playing "One Last Drink" and "Minstrel Boy" (from Casualties). Also that month, on March 9 and 10, they recorded shows at the Iron Horse Music Hall in Northampton, Massachusetts, then released the live album, Northampton.

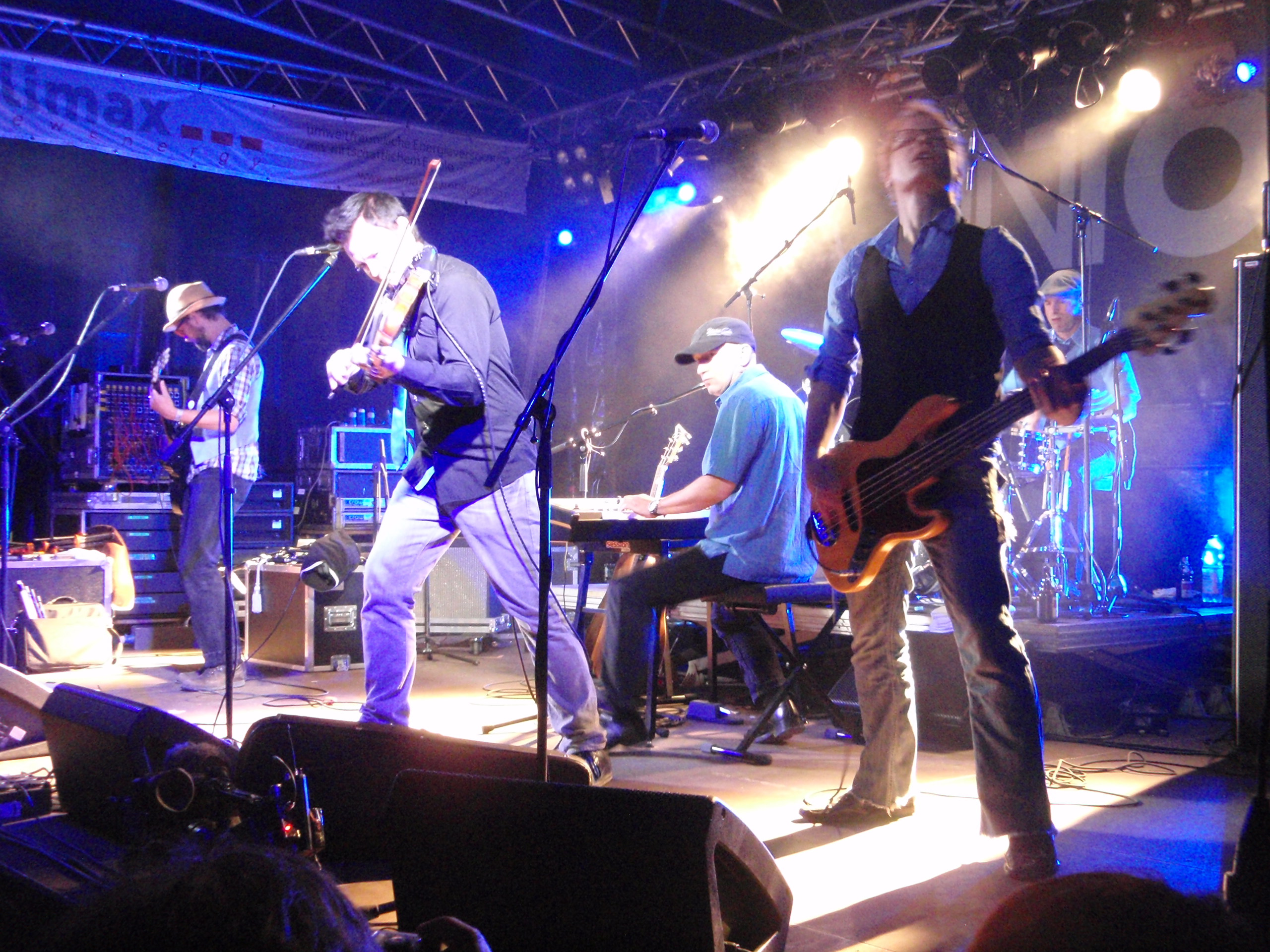
Enter the Haggis live in 2011. From left to right: Trevor Lewington, Brian Buchanan, Craig Downie, Mark Abraham, and Bruce McCarthy.

Starting with Whitelake in 2011, Enter the Haggis's next three studio albums were funded with $150,000.00 raised through crowdfunding sites Bandzoogle, Kickstarter, and PledgeMusic. The first $40,000 was used to produce Whitelake. The album was named after White Lake, Ontario near where the recording studio was located, and in which Buchanan capsized his canoe in the near-freezing water and had to swim to shore.

In July 2012, the band launched a campaign on Kickstarter to raise the funds needed to produce The Modest Revolution, a concept album with songs all inspired by articles from a March 30, 2012 edition of The Globe and Mail. The band achieved their initial $20,000 goal within the first 12 hours and reached a total of $66,035 from 895 backers by completion of the campaign. The album was released in 2013, along with the Live at Saint Claire live album and concert film that was funded by the same campaign. On November 1, 2013, Enter the Haggis launched a campaign on PledgeMusic, called "The Penny Black Project", to create a new album based on story submissions from their fans.

=== Jubilee Riots ===
In September 2014, the band announced via social media and their website that it was retiring the Enter the Haggis name and recording and performing as Jubilee Riots. The name change was made to reflect the move in the band's sound, away from Celtic rock to one more inclusive of other influences. In the announcement they described their old name as "paint[ing] a one-dimensional picture that doesn't represent our varied musical influences." In an interview, Buchanan explained that the name "Enter the Haggis" was confusing to new fans who would come to the music with a preconceived notion of what the band would sound like, and that the new name allowed them to redefine their identity in the types of music they played. "Jubilee Riots" is a reference to the 1875 riots in Toronto that Buchanan described as a "formative event in Canadian-Irish history".

The band's last show before changing their name took place on October 11 at the Westcott Theater in Syracuse, New York, which was recorded as the live album Live at the Westcott and released the following year.

Penny Black, the first album incorporating the marked change in sound, was released under the Jubilee Riots name in November 2014. It peaked at #9 on Billboard's Heatseekers Albums chart the week of November 22.

=== Return to Enter the Haggis ===
In November 2015, the band announced a return to Celtic rock influences and the Enter the Haggis name, acknowledging that the name change had not gone over well with fans. The announcement coincided with the release of Cheers and Echoes, a compilation album to mark the band's 20th anniversary, consisting of songs spanning the period of 1998 to 2015.

In 2015, Enter the Haggis released Live at The Westcott, a compilation of favorite songs recorded live at The Westcott Theater in Syracuse, New York, in October 2014. An EP titled Broken Arms was released in late 2016. In 2020, following another Kickstarter campaign to cover production costs, they released their ninth studio album,The Archer's Parade, via a livestream listening party.

As of 2022, Rose Baldino (formerly of Burning Bridget Cleary) has been included in press materials as a full band member. She had previously appeared on stage with Enter the Haggis on tour, besides being a member of House of Hamill with her husband Brian Buchanan. In December 2022, Mark Abraham, band member of 22 years, resigned as bassist for Enter The Haggis, and the band announced that Caroline Browning would be joining them as their new bassist. Browning had previously filled in for Mark Abraham when needed as well as played in House of Hamill. Tom Barraco joined the band on drums during the summer tour of 2023.

In February 2024, the band announced by email that Trevor Lewington would be taking a leave of absence due to the illness of his child, and that the band would tour without him. Later that year, the band announced that after 30 years they will retire from touring after a series of shows, ending on March 16, 2025.

== Band members ==
Current members

- Craig Downie – vocals, bagpipes, harmonica, guitar, keyboards, tin whistle, trumpet (1995–present)
- Brian Buchanan – vocals, fiddle, keyboard, guitar, mandolin, accordion
- Trevor Lewington – vocals, guitar, octave mandolin, keyboard (1999–present)
- Rose Baldino – fiddle, backing vocals (2022–present)
- Caroline Browning – bass guitar, backing vocals (2023–present)
- Tom Barraco – drums (2023–present)

Former members

- Mark Abraham – bass guitar, vocals (2001-2022)
- Duncan Cameron – fiddle
- James Campbell – drums (1999–2010)
- Ken Horne – drums (1995–1999)
- Bruce McCarthy – drums (2010–2023)
- Rob "Rodent" McCrady – bass guitar, vocals (1995–2001)
- Owen Pallett – fiddle
- Tom Paterson – guitar
- Donald Quan – multi-instrumentalist

== Discography ==
Studio albums

- Let the Wind Blow High, 1998
- Aerials, 2001
- Casualties of Retail, 2005
- Soapbox Heroes, 2006
- Gutter Anthems, 2009
- Whitelake, 2011
- The Modest Revolution, 2013
- Penny Black (as Jubilee Riots), 2014
- The Archer's Parade, 2020

Live albums

- ETH Live!, 2002
- Northampton, 2007
- 2012 Live, 2012
- Live at Saint Claire, 2013
- Live at the Westcott, 2015

Compilation albums

- Cheers and Echoes, 2015

Extended plays

- Alternates, 2009
- Valentine's Day EP, 2014
- Penny Red (as Jubilee Riots), 2014
- Broken Arms, 2016

Singles

- Swallowed by a Whale, 2023

=== Filmography ===
- Live at Lanigan's Ball, 2003
- Live at The Real Room, 2009
- Live at Saint Claire, 2014
