= Cómplices Al Rescate: El Gran Final =

Soundtrack album by Cómplices Al Rescate
- Released: October 22, 2002 (US)
- Recorded: 2002
- Genre: Latin pop
- Label: BMG, Ariola
- Producer: Alejandro Abaroa

Cómplices Al Rescate chronology
Cómplices Al Rescate: Mariana (2002)	Cómplices Al Rescate: El Gran Final (2002)	Canta con Cómplices Al Rescate (2005)

Cómplices Al Rescate: El Gran Final is the third soundtrack for the Mexican television series Cómplices Al Rescate (Friends to the Rescue). It was released in Mexico by Ariola Records, a subsidiary of BMG.

== Information ==
The CD contains the music from the series performed for the cast, including Daniela Luján, Martín Ricca, Fabián Chávez and the "Cómplices": Alex Speitzer, Ramiro Torres, Vadhir Derbez, Martha Sabrina, Dulce María López and Diego Amozurrutia.

== Track listing ==
No.	Title	Writer(s)	Performer(s)	Length
1.	"Cómplices al Rescate"	Christina Abaroa, Alejandro Abaroa, Pablo Aguirre	Daniela Luján, Martín Ricca & the Cómplices	2:57
2.	"Locos de Amor"	Christina Abaroa, Alejandro Abaroa, Pablo Aguirre, Salvador Núñez	Daniela Luján & Martín Ricca	3:38
3.	"Alcanzar la Libertad"	Alejandro Abaroa, Jesús Flores "La Bota"	The Cómplices	3:36
4.	"No Tardes Más"		Daniela Luján	4:09
5.	"Es Tiempo de Amar"	Christina Abaroa, Alejandro Abaroa, Pablo Aguirre, Salvador Núñez	Daniela Luján & the Cómplices	3:23
6.	"El Ritmo de la Vida"	Christina Abaroa, Alejandro Abaroa, Pablo Aguirre	Daniela Luján, Martín Ricca & the Cómplices	4:19
7.	"Amistad"	Alejandro Abaroa, Héctor Buquet Corleto, Jorge Alberto Nazar	Daniela Luján, Martín Ricca & the Cómplices	2:46
8.	"No Me Rompas el Corazón"		Martín Ricca	3:30
9.	"La Fuerza de la Amistad"	Alejandro Abaroa, Jesús Flores "La Bota"	Martín Ricca & the Cómplices	3:05
10.	"Ven Conmigo"	Christina Abaroa, Alejandro Abaroa, Pablo Aguirre, Salvador Núñez	Daniela Luján, Martín Ricca & the Cómplices	4:03

== Charts ==
Year	Album Chart	Peak position
2002	U.S. Billboard Top Latin Albums	34
2003	U.S. Billboard Latin Pop Albums	15
2003	U.S. Billboard Top Latin Albums	34 (x2)
Year	Single Chart	Peak position
2002	U.S. Billboard Latin Pop Airplay	31
2002	U.S. Billboard Latin Tropical/Salsa Airplay	11

== See also ==
- Cómplices Al Rescate: Silvana
- Cómplices Al Rescate: Mariana
