= White Lake fen =

Coordinates: 45.34°N 76.50°W

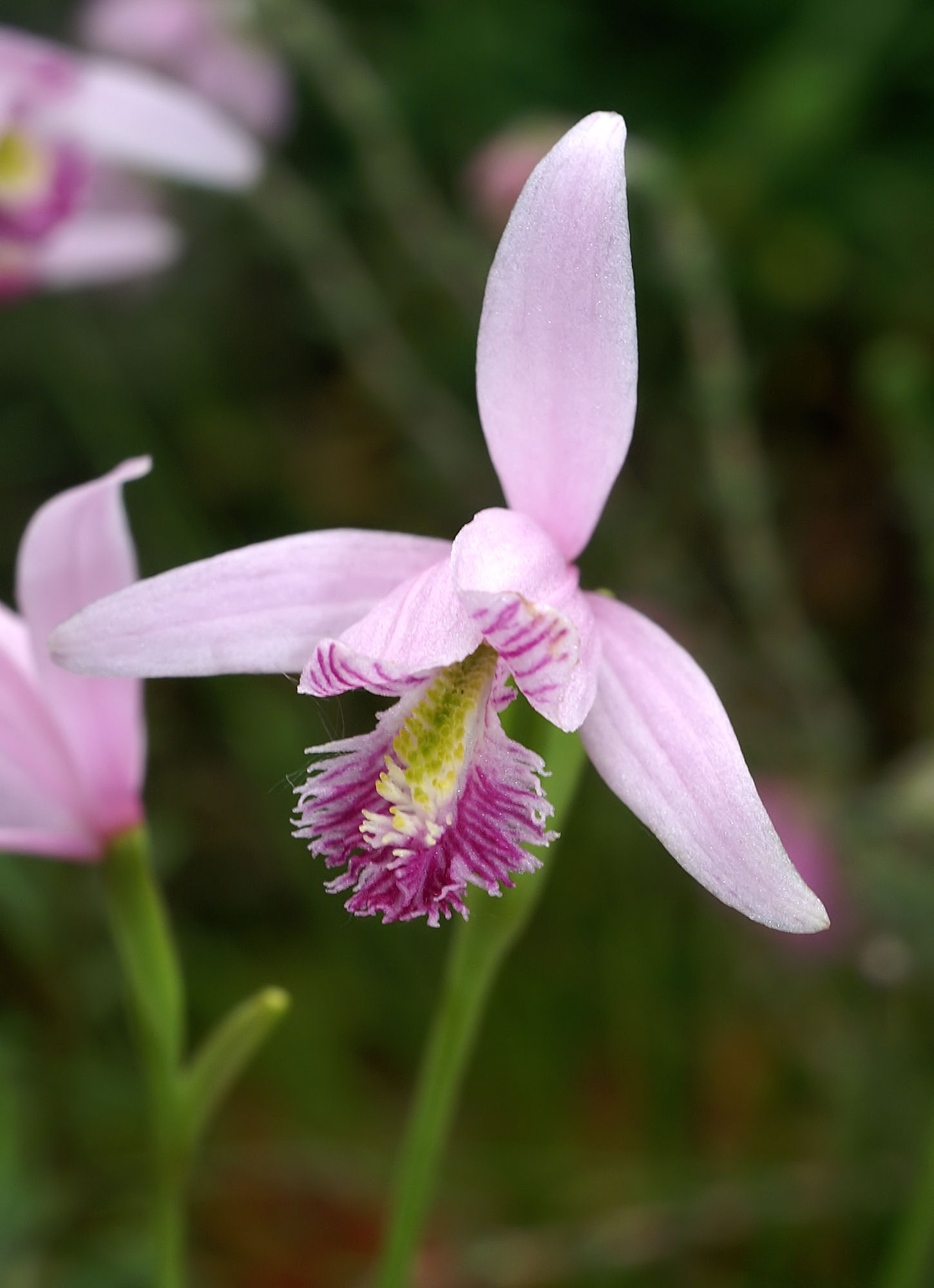
Rose Pogonia grows in the fen at White Lake.

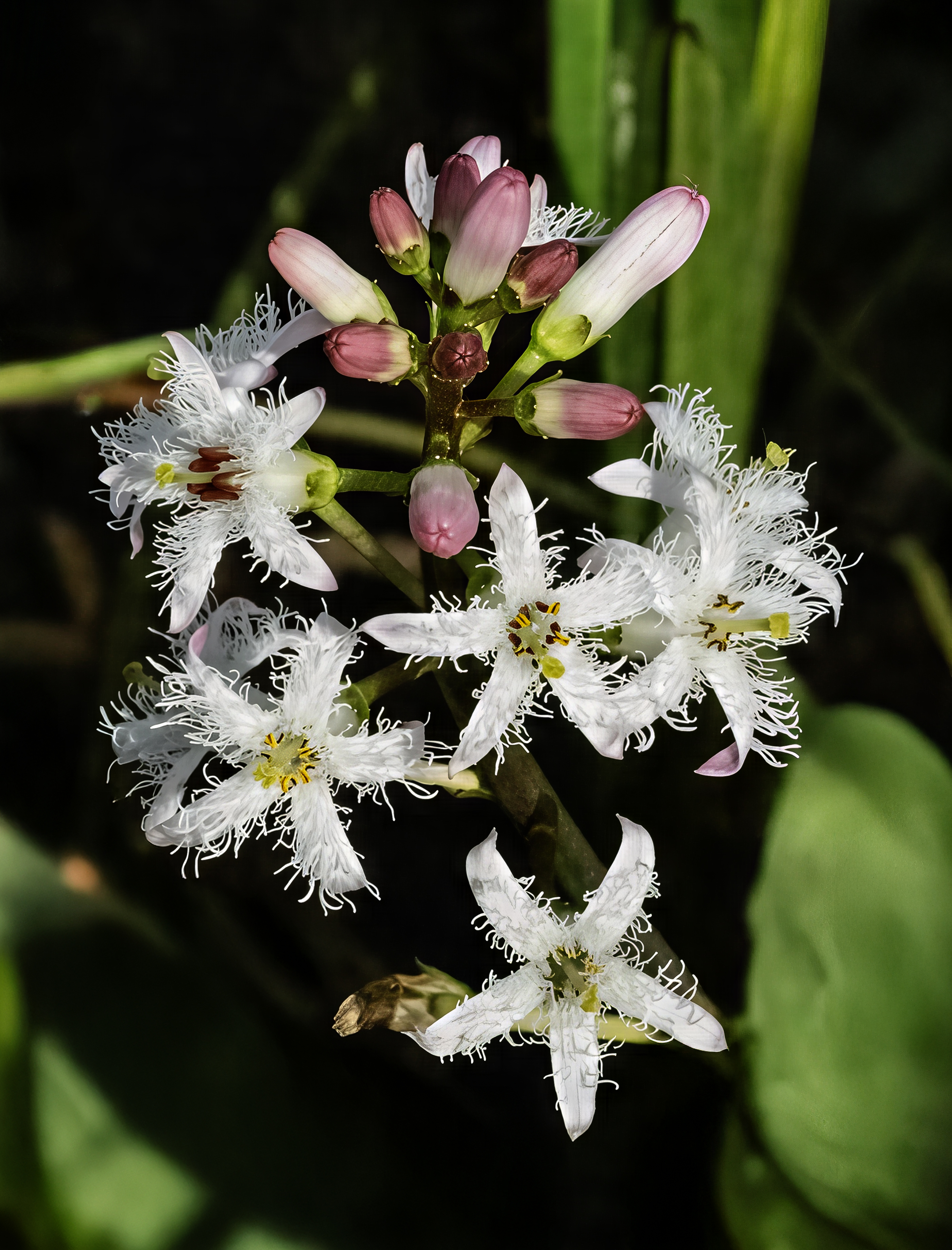
Bogbean in flower.

The White Lake fen is a small wetland on the shore of White Lake in Lanark County, Ontario in Canada. It has been designated both an Area of Natural and Scientific Interest and a Provincially Significant Wetland; it is also listed as a Special Place in Lanark County. Fens are a relatively rare wetland habitat in the region of Lanark County; they can occur on either marble or limestone bedrock. White lake has a granite dome along its north shore, while it spreads over marble bedrock to the south. A number of calcareous fens have developed along the south shore. The largest of these has developed in a long narrow arm of the lake, where it stretches for nearly two kilometers and covers 90 ha.

This fen has large areas of sedge mat dominated by wooly sedge (Carex lasiocarpa). Two of the unusual plants there are the orchids Pogonia ophioglossoides (see upper photo) and Calopogon tuberosus. There are also many species of ericaceous shrubs including Labrador tea (Ledum groenlandicum), Kalmia angustifolia, and Andromeda glaucophylla. The presence of evergreen shrubs indicates the low nutrient levels in the wetland. In drier locations nearer the shore, there are wet conifer forests with trees including white cedar and black spruce. Fens connected to open water, like this fen, have been found to differ in subtle ways from more isolated fens.

This fen is also one of the few Canadian locations for the bogbean buckmoth a species of silk moth that feeds on another typical fen plant, bogbean (Menyanthes trifoliata).
