= El mesero =

Mexican film

- Film poster
- Directed by: Raúl Martínez
- Written by: Alberto Bremer
- Starring: Vadhir Derbez; Bárbara López
- Production company: Bh5
- Release date: 3 December 2020
- Country: Mexico
- Language: Spanish

El mesero (lit. 'The waiter') is a 2020 Mexican comedy film directed by Raúl Martínez. The film stars Vadhir Derbez, and Bárbara López. The production of the film began on June 21, 2019, in Mexico City. The plot revolves around Rodrigo Sada, a young waiter who wants to be a millionaire to lead the life of luxury and sophistication he sees in the clients of the restaurant where he works. His ambition leads him to take an easy route to try to get what he wants. It is written jointly between Raúl and Alberto Bremer, and was released on 3 December 2020.

== Cast ==
- Vadhir Derbez as Rodrigo
- Bárbara López as Mariana
- Emiliano Zurita as Pedro
- Arturo Barba as Saviñon
- Sabine Moussier as Estela
- Gustavo Sánchez Parra as Pasilla
- Ignacia Allamand as Executive woman
- Ariel Levy as Samuel
- Claudio Lafarga as Patrick
- Ruy Senderos as Cliente 1
- Lizbeth Rodríguez
- Guillermo Villegas as Luis
- Franco Escamilla as Taquero
