= Cómplices Al Rescate: Mariana =

Soundtrack album by Cómplices Al Rescate
- Released: February 14, 2002 (MEX); October 22, 2002 (US)
- Recorded: 2001
- Genre: Grupera, latin pop
- Length: 41:42
- Label: BMG, Ariola
- Producer: Alejandro Abaroa

Cómplices Al Rescate chronology
Cómplices Al Rescate: Mariana (2002)	Cómplices Al Rescate: El Gran Final (2002)

Cómplices Al Rescate: Mariana is the second soundtrack for the Mexican television series Cómplices Al Rescate (Friends to the Rescue) and was released in Mexico by Ariola Records, a subsidiary of BMG.

== Information ==
The CD contains the music from the series performed for the cast, including Belinda, Laura Flores, Fabián Chávez, Johnny Lozada, Silvia Lomelí and the "Cómplices": Alex Speitzer, Ramiro Torres, Vadhir Derbez, Martha Sabrina, Dulce María López and Diego Amozurrutia. The soundtrack was certified platinum.

== Track listing ==
No.	Title	Writer(s)	Performer(s)	Length
1.	"Cómplices al Rescate"	Christina Abaroa, Alejandro Abaroa, Pablo Aguirre	Belinda, Fabián & the Cómplices	2:55
2.	"Sácame a Bailar"	Alejandro Abaroa, Alejandro Carballo	Belinda & the Cómplices	3:33
3.	"Dónde Dime Dónde"	Christina Abaroa, Alejandro Abaroa	Laura Flores	3:30
4.	"Llévame a Volar"	Alejandro Abaroa, Alejandro Carballo	Belinda & Fabián	3:52
5.	"Ha Llegado a Mí el Amor"	Christina Abaroa, Alejandro Abaroa	Fabián Chávez	3:15
6.	"El Baile del Sapito"	Christina Abaroa, Alejandro Abaroa	The Cómplices	3:02
7.	"Sabes"	Alejandro Abaroa, Alejandro Carballo	Belinda & Fabián	3:31
8.	"Por Tu Amor"	Alejandro Abaroa, Alejandro Carballo	Belinda & the Cómplices	3:54
9.	"Agradezco"	Christina Abaroa, Alejandro Abaroa	Laura Flores	3:21
10.	"Por Ellas"	Alejandro Abaroa, Pablo Aguirre	Vadhir Derbez & Fabián Chávez	3:25
11.	"Volver a Casa"	Christina Abaroa, Alejandro Abaroa	Belinda & the Cómplices	3:35
12.	"Lazos"	Alejandro Abaroa, Alejandro Carballo	Belinda & the Cómplices	3:42
Total length:				41:42

== Charts and certifications ==
=== Charts ===
Year	Chart	Peak position
2002	U.S. Billboard Regional Mexican Albums	1
2002	U.S. Billboard Top Latin Albums	5
2003	U.S. Billboard Regional Mexican Albums	1 (x2)
2003	U.S. Billboard Top Latin Albums	5 (x2)

=== Certifications ===
Country (2002)	Certification
Mexico	Platinum (AMPROFON)

== Personnel ==
- Performers: Belinda, Laura Flores, Fabián Chávez, Jonny Lozada, Silvia Lomelí and the "Cómplices": Alex Speitzer, Ramiro Torres, Vadhir Derbez, Martha Sabrina, Dulce María López and Diego Amozurrutia.
- Metals: Alejandro Carballo and Cindy Shea.
- Battery: Paul González.
- Percussion: Ricardo "Tiki" Pasillas
- Guitars: George Doering and Pablo Aguirre.
- Keyboards: Pablo Aguirre and Alejandro Carballo
- Chorus: Francis Benítez, Carlos Murguía and Alejandro Abaroa.

== Production ==
- Musical Direction: Pablo Aguirre.
- Arrangements: Pablo Aguirre, Christina Abaroa and Alejandro Carballo.
- Programming: Pablo Aguirre and Alejandro Carballo.
- Coordinator Of Production: Christina Abaroa.
- A&R Direction: Guillermo Guitiérrez.
- A&R Coordination: Gabriela Pagaza.

== See also ==
- Cómplices Al Rescate: Silvana
- Cómplices Al Rescate: El Gran Final
