= Johnny Mooring =

- Birth name: John Henry Mooring
- Born: May 17, 1927; Springhill, Nova Scotia, Canada
- Died: March 28, 1974 (aged 46); Ottawa, Ontario, Canada
- Genres: Country Music, Folk music
- Occupation(s): Fiddler, Singer-Songwriter, Vocalist
- Instrument: Fiddle, Vocals
- Labels: Rodeo Records, Banff Records

Johnny Mooring was a Canadian fiddler. He was born in Springhill, Nova Scotia, Canada, on May 17, 1927, to Henry and Caroline Mooring. He was the ninth of ten children.

Mooring learned the rudiments of playing the fiddle from his mother - and from the time he first picked up the instrument it became an extension of the man for the rest of his life.

At the age of 12, Mooring started playing the fiddle for parties. He remembered his early beginnings and humble ancestry by carrying with him throughout his life the first payment he ever received... 35 cents.

He became one of the most respected fiddle players in North America, winning the North American Fiddle Championship Trophy, in Shelburne, Ontario, Canada, for three consecutive years: 1964–66. Judges remarks included references to his ability to translate a waltz (e.g. The Twilight Waltz, The Dauphin Waltz) with such intense emotion.

During his lifetime he released twelve record albums and appeared on many radio and television shows including The Don Messer and Tommy Hunter shows. He was an enthusiastic composer of fiddle tunes and tried his hand at writing songs. He sings and plays fiddle on the album, "Four Strings and I". Apart from the fiddle he also played piano, organ, accordion, banjo, mandolin, clarinet and trumpet. Brian Buchanan of Enter the Haggis wrote that Mooring "was arguably the first 'rock star' of traditional Canadian music."

Mooring had two daughters, Sandra and Sharon Mooring, and four grandchildren and seven great-grandchildren.

Mooring was injured in a fight on March 24, 1974, in a parking lot in Rivière-Beaudette, Quebec, and died four days later at Ottawa Centre Hospital. In her book, "Mountain City Girls: The McGarrigle Family Album", Anna McGarrigle provided an account of the incident, saying that, after a performance he was followed into the parking lot by two men and beaten to death for perceived flirtation with a girl who was with them.
