= White Lake (Ontario) =

Lake in Ontario, Canada

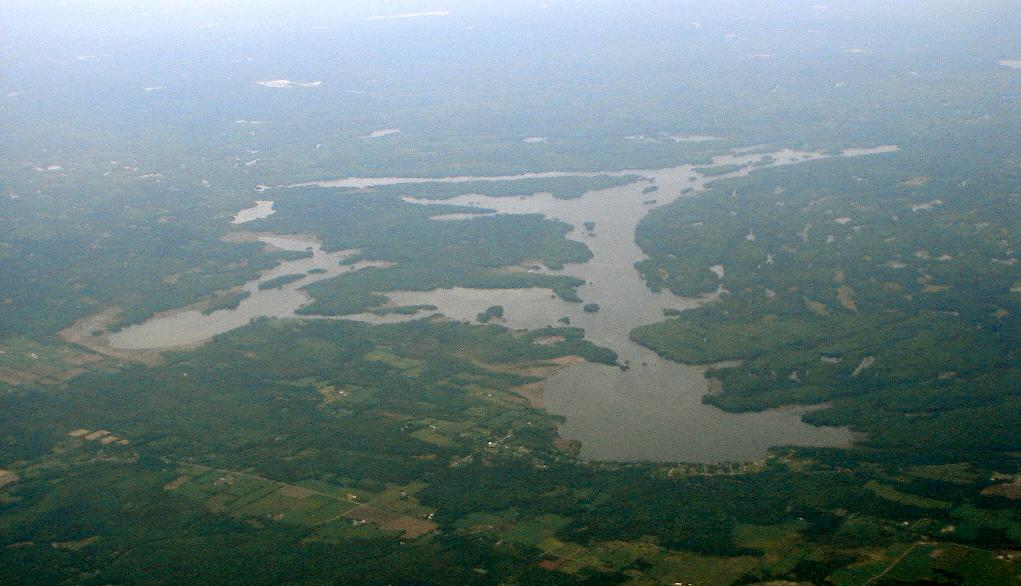

- Location within Ontario
- Location: Ontario
- Coordinates: 45°18′36″N 76°31′12″W
- Primary outflows: Indian Creek, Waba Creek
- Basin countries: Canada
- Max. length: 16 km (9.9 mi)
- Surface area: 22.7 km^{2} (8.8 sq mi)
- Shore length^{1}: 98 km (61 mi)
- Settlements: White Lake, Ontario
- ^{1} Shore length is not a well-defined measure.

White Lake is a medium-sized lake of Ontario, Canada. It is located in Renfrew County, 60 kilometres (37 mi) west of Ottawa, Ontario, near Calabogie to the west and Arnprior to the north. It may be accessed via Highway 417 from Ottawa or Renfrew Country Road 511 from Perth. The town of White Lake lies on the northern shore of the lake.

The northern and western shores of White Lake mark the upper limit of the Champlain Sea which flooded the Ottawa Valley at the end of the last ice age.

The lake is 16 kilometres (9.9 mi) long with an area of 2,270 hectares (5,600 acres) and a perimeter of 98 kilometres (61 mi). The lake is marked in Canada by National Resources Canada with the CGNDB Unique Identifier: FDDES.

== History ==
Before European settlement the lake was known as Wa-ba-lac by the local natives. In the Johnston Royal atlas (dated 1860) the lake was shown as Wabak or White Lake. The lake name is believed to be derived from the white marl deposits covering large portions of the lake substrate. White Lake was created in 1845 when a dam on Waba Creek was constructed resulting in the water levels increasing in three previously small, interconnected waterbodies. The original White Lake Dam was built with the purpose of providing water storage for the operation of Stewart's sawmill at Waba, four kilometres (2.5 mi) downstream. The dam was rebuilt in 1948 and in 1969, was purchased by the Ontario Ministry of Natural Resources and reconstructed again.

In the 1970s summer water levels were stabilized for the benefit of boaters and shoreline property owners. There has been concern over the presence of algal bloom which has become more prevalent as shorelines are developed and local human presence increases.

== Ecology ==
Prior to 1930 White Lake supported a northern pike fishery. With intensive stocking a walleye fishery developed during the period between 1930 and the mid 1960s. Since that time, largemouth bass and northern pike have been the most sought after game fish with walleye being seen only periodically in the anglers catch. Sunfish are also commonplace in White Lake.

The lake is regionally significant for the presence of the White Lake Fen, which is a rare wetland type in Lanark County and considered to be a Provincially Significant Wetland and a Special Place.

== See also ==
- List of lakes in Ontario
