= The Mooring (2021 film) =

Mexican horror film

- Film poster
- Spanish: El Amarre
- Directed by: Tamae Garateguy
- Written by: Carlos Quintanilla Sakar
- Produced by: Billy Rovzar
- Starring: Sofia Espinoza; Vadhir Derbez; Fabiola Guajardo
- Cinematography: Diego Gajardo
- Edited by: Andres Martinez Rios
- Music by: Simon Boswell
- Distributed by: Amazon Prime Video
- Release date: October 29, 2021 (Mexico)
- Running time: 86 minutes
- Country: Mexico
- Language: Spanish

The Mooring (Spanish: El amarre) is a 2021 Mexican horror film directed by Tamae Garateguy and produced by Lemon Films under the banner Lemonster. The film's main plot follows Julieta a young woman who, after casting a love spell over a co-worker involuntarily unleashes the dark side of her new boyfriend. The film was distributed mainly as a streaming movie due to COVID-19 restrictions in Mexico, which lead to the film being acquired by Amazon Prime Video. Starring Vadhir Derbez and Sofia Espinoza, the movie became one of the most-watched films in the streaming on Mexico during its weekend premiere.

== Plot ==
After visiting a market looking for magical powder for working prosperity, Julieta, a young woman, is convinced by her best friend Elena to buy magical love powder for herself even though she doesn't believe in magic. The next day she uses the powder on her co-worker, Daniel, to draw his attention to no avail. However, Elena receives a promotion, which leads her to believe it was thanks to the powder. That night they both, with the rest of their co-workers and Daniel celebrate Elena's promotion. Drunk, and unsatisfied with the powder's lack of effects, Julieta convinces Elena to return to the magical store for a more efficient love spell. In response, the store owner, Santana, performs a powerful blood ritual. The magic seems successful, as Daniel follows Julieta to her apartment after work, where they kiss and eventually sleep together.

At first, Julieta enjoys her newfound relationship with Daniel until he begins acting possessively and aggressively accuses her of flirting with their boss in the office that ends with him losing his job . When Julieta returns to her apartment Daniel hits her and destroys her living room, blaming her for causing his unemployment.

Julieta remembers the warnings from Gabriela, a woman who dated Daniel before her who claims he is not what he appears, and tries to contact her only to discover she suffered an accident. Fearing for her safety Julieta (along with Elena) visits Santana to break the spell, but she warns them she cannot undo it. Elena suggests Julieta stay in the cabin of her family as a distraction. Even though Julieta accepts, both women are found by Daniel, who breaks in at night, forcing Julieta to knock him down, apparently killing him.

Julieta tells Elena that the police won't believe the circumstances of Daniel's demise, they take his car and set it on fire with him inside. Days later, thinks she has got over it, but she hears and sees what appears to be Daniel's ghost, now with burning scars, taunting and threatening her that he will haunt her forever. At first she thinks he might be a hallucination, but when she sees him killing their boss, she believes Daniel is somehow following her, even after death. News of the mysterious death spreads between the rest of the workers, including Elena,who then goes to Julieta's apartment to comfort her, finding her paranoid and nervous. Julieta tells Elena her current situation, but she doesn't believe her and tries to take her to a hospital, causing a violent and jealous Daniel to lift and toss her out of the window, killing her.

Alone and desperate, Julieta goes to Santana's store and begs for a solution. Santana reveals that she knows a deadly spell that would take her to the border of life and death, a place where Daniel will be waiting for her to drag her to be with him eternally. However, it will provide her with enough time to cut the bond and break free if she successfully escapes before the fire of the ceremony extinguishes. Julieta performs the spell, taking her to a dimension where Daniel tries to distract her while she is trying to escape. Julieta cuts off her wedding finger tied to Daniel's but she fails to break free before the ceremony's end, leaving her soul trapped with Daniel's forever.

== Cast ==
- Sofía Espinosa as Julieta
- Vadhir Derbez as Daniel
- Fabiola Guajardo as Elena
- Danae Reynaud as Karla
- Jorge Gallegos as Marin
- Marisela García as Santera
- Ana Lucia Robleda as Gabriela

== Production ==
The film is a co-production of Video Cine with Lemon Studios under its banner "Lemonster"; a subsidiary of the main studio focused exclusively on horror films. Vadhir Derbez a well-known Mexican comedian-actor took the role to diversify his filmography considering horror as a challenging genre film. Espinoza believes Garateguy blent horror with social commentaries as gender violence especially with actress Ana Lucia Robleda part who plays Gabriela, a woman victim of a violent relationship.

Principal photography began in mid-July 2019 and concluded around a month before the shooting of "El Mesero", another movie sterilized by Derbez.

== Distribution ==
The film was officially released on October 29, 2021, on Amazon Prime Video as an exclusive streaming title. Originally scheduled for a theatrical release in Mexico, the film was delayed due to COVID-19 pandemic restrictions before being bought by Prime Video that also acquired other movies from Lemon Films. Due to the acquisition, the film lacked promotion from marketing and critics alike.
