= Cómplices Al Rescate: Silvana =

Soundtrack album by Cómplices Al Rescate
- Released: February 14, 2002 (MEX); October 22, 2002 (US)
- Recorded: 2001
- Genre: Pop rock, latin pop
- Length: 39:03
- Label: BMG, Ariola
- Producer: Alejandro Abaroa

Cómplices Al Rescate chronology
Cómplices Al Rescate: Silvana (2002)	Cómplices Al Rescate: Mariana (2002)

Cómplices Al Rescate: Silvana is the first soundtrack for the Mexican television series Cómplices Al Rescate (Friends to the Rescue). It was released in Mexico by Ariola Records, a subsidiary of BMG.

== Information ==
The CD contains the music from the series performed for the cast, including Belinda, Laura Flores, Fabián Chávez, Johnny Lozada, Silvia Lomelí and the "Cómplices": Alex Speitzer, Ramiro Torres, Vadhir Derbez, Martha Sabrina, Dulce María López and Diego Amozurrutia. The soundtrack was certified platinum.

== Track listing ==
No.	Title	Writer(s)	Performer(s)	Length
1.	"Cómplices al Rescate"	Christina Abaroa, Alejandro Abaroa, Pablo Aguirre	Belinda, Fabián & the Cómplices	3:04
2.	"Juntos"	Christina Abaroa, Alejandro Abaroa, Pablo Aguirre	The Cómplices	4:09
3.	"Contigo Siempre"	Christina Abaroa, Alejandro Abaroa, Pablo Aguirre	Belinda & Laura Flores	2:55
4.	"De Nuevo el Amor"	Christina Abaroa, Alejandro Abaroa, Pablo Aguirre	Belinda & Ramiro Torres	3:44
5.	"Alma Gemela"	Christina Abaroa, Alejandro Abaroa, Pablo Aguirre	Belinda	4:02
6.	"Esas Pequeñas Cosas"	Alejandro Abaroa, Pablo Aguirre	Johnny Lozada, Silvia Lomelí & the Cómplices	3:10
7.	"Siente el Amor"	Alejandro Abaroa, Alejandro Carballo	Belinda & the Cómplices	3:49
8.	"Superstar"	Alejandro Abaroa, Christina Abaroa, Pablo Aguirre	Belinda	3:17
9.	"Al Rescate ¡Ya!"	Alejandro Abaroa, Christina Abaroa, Pablo Aguirre	The Cómplices	3:19
10.	"Dónde Está el Amor"	Alejandro Abaroa, Alejandro Carballo	Belinda	3:14
11.	"Mentiras"	Alejandro Abaroa, Alejandro Carballo	Fabián Chávez	3:46
12.	"Mi Gran Amigo"	Alejandro Abaroa, Christina Abaroa, Pablo Aguirre	The Cómplices	3:49
Total length:				39:03

== Charts and certifications ==
=== Charts ===
Year	Chart	Peak position
2002	U.S. Billboard Latin Pop Albums	9
2002	U.S. Billboard Top Latin Albums	11
2003	U.S. Billboard Latin Pop Albums	5
2003	U.S. Billboard Top Latin Albums	6

=== Certifications ===
Country (2002)	Certification
Mexico	Platinum (AMPROFON)

== Personnel ==
- Performers: Belinda, Laura Flores, Fabián Chávez, Johnny Lozada, Silvia Lomelí and the "Cómplices": Alex Speitzer, Ramiro Torres, Vadhir Derbez, Martha Sabrina, Dulce María López and Diego Amozurrutia.
- Metals: Alejandro Carballo and Cindy Shea.
- Battery: Paul González.
- Percussion: Ricardo "Tiki" Pasillas.
- Guitars: George Doering and Pablo Aguirre.
- Keyboards: Pablo Aguirre and Alejandro Carballo.
- Chorus: Francis Benítez, Carlos Murguía and Alejandro Abaroa.

== Production ==
- Musical Direction: Pablo Aguirre .
- Arrangements: Pablo Aguirre, Christina Abaroa and Alejandro Carballo.
- Programming: Pablo Aguirre and Alejandro Carballo.
- Coordinator Of Production: Christina Abaroa.
- A&R Direction: Guillermo Guitiérrez.
- A&R Coordination: Gabriela Pagaza.

== See also ==
- Cómplices Al Rescate: Mariana
- Cómplices Al Rescate: El Gran Final
