= Cassandra Sánchez Navarro =

Mexican actress

- Born: 3 July 1991 (age 35); Mexico City, Mexico
- Education: Centro de Educación Artística
- Occupation: Actress
- Years active: 2012–present
- Mother: Mónica Sánchez Navarro
- Relatives: Manolo Fábregas (grandfather); Rafael Sánchez Navarro (uncle)

Cassandra Sánchez Navarro (born 3 July 1991) is a Mexican actress, best known for her role Chelito Durán in the Televisa's telenovela Corona de lágrimas, adaptation of the 1965 telenovela of the same name. Later she stood out as a villain in the telenovela Quiero amarte, where she played Flavia. Recently she has had important roles in series such as La bella y las bestias (2018), This Is Silvia Pinal (2019), where she played Silvia Pinal's deceased daughter, Viridiana Alatriste. Cassandra is daughter of the actress Mónica Sánchez Navarro, niece of the actor Rafael Sánchez Navarro, granddaughter of the actors Manolo Fábregas and Fela Fábregas, great-granddaughter of actress Fanny Schiller and great-great-granddaughter of actress Virginia Fábregas, her grandparents, great-grandmother and great-great-grandmother belong to the Golden Age of Mexican cinema. She studied acting and dramaturgy at the Televisa Centro de Educación Artística from which she left in 2011.

== Filmography ==
Films roles
Year	Title	Roles	Notes
2020	Cindy la Regia	Cindy la Regia	
2021	Peligro en tu mirada	Pía Navarro	
2022	Enfermo amor	Celia	
2023	Tangos, tequilas y algunas mentiras	Lu	
2024	Todas menos tú	Sandra	
2025	Mirreyes contra Godínez: Las Vegas	Srta. Garza	

Television roles
Year	Title	Roles	Notes
2012–2022	Corona de lágrimas	Chelito Durán	Series regular (season 1); guest (season 2)
2013–2014	Quiero amarte	Flavia	Series regular; 149 episodes
2015	La sombra del pasado	Verónica	Guest role; 20 episodes
2015	Sense8	Nun	2 episodes
2016	Yago	Jimena	Recurring role; 17 episodes
2017	Las 13 esposas de Wilson Fernández	Gloria	Episode: "Gloria"
2018	La bella y las bestias	Penélope Zapata	Series regular; 63 episodes
2018–2019	Las Buchonas	Gabriela León	Series regular; 20 episodes
2019	This Is Silvia Pinal	Viridiana Alatriste	4 episodes
2019	Sitiados: México	Carminia	8 episodes
2019	El Dragón	Chisca Garza	
2022	Natural Born Narco	María José	
2023	La hora marcada	Bea	Episode: "Smog"
2023	Candy Cruz	Candy Cruz	Lead role
2024	El juego de las llaves	Daniela	Lead role (season 3)
2024	Consuelo	Consuelo	Lead role
2024–2025	El extraño retorno de Diana Salazar	Irene Vallejos / Inés Betancourt	Series regular
2025	Mujeres asesinas	Adriana	Episode: "Adriana"

== Awards ==
Year	Award	Category	Nominated work	Result	Ref.
2025	Premios Aura	Best Acting in Comedy series	Consuelo	Won	
2025	Premios India Catalina	Best Actress in Iberoamerican Fiction Series	Consuelo	Won	
