= Michelle Garza Cervera =

Mexican filmmaker (born 1987)

- Cervera in 2023
- Born: Alicia Michelle Garza Cervera; 27 September 1987 (age 38); Mexico City, Mexico
- Occupations: Film director Screenwriter

Michelle Garza Cervera (born 27 September 1987) is a Mexican film director and screenwriter. She is best known by her directorial debut film Huesera: The Bone Woman which was awarded the Best New Narrative Director and the Nora Ephron Award at the Tribeca Festival.

== Career ==
Michelle Garza Cervera is a graduate of the Centro de Capacitación Cinematográfica in Mexico City. Garza obtained the Chevening scholarship to pursue a master's degree in Film Direction at Goldsmiths, University of London, in the United Kingdom.

Her short films have been selected in more than 100 international film festivals, such as Fantastic Fest, the Sitges Fantastic Film Festival, the Havana Film Festival, among others. Garza also directed three episodes for the series Marea alta, which premiered in September 2020 on Vix+.

In 2022, Michelle Garza Cervera released her directorial debut film: Huesera: The Bone Woman, a supernatural body horror film. The film tells the story of a woman who, after becoming pregnant, is attacked by a sinister entity.

In March 2023, the Sundance Institute announced Michelle Garza as a fifth-generation recipient of the Momentum Fellowship, which offers support to filmmakers from underrepresented groups.

== Personal life ==
Garza Cervera is bisexual.

== Filmography ==
=== Short films ===
Year	Title	Director	Writer	Editor
2013	Isósceles	Yes	Yes	No
2016	La Rabia de Clara	Yes	Yes	Yes
2017	Abismal	Yes	Yes	No
2018	The Original	Yes	No	No
2020	Falha Comum	Yes	No	No

=== Feature films ===
Year	Title	Director	Writer	Producer	Notes
2017	México Bárbaro II	Yes	Yes	Yes	Segment: "Vitriol"
2022	Huesera: The Bone Woman	Yes	Yes	Co-producer	Directorial debut
2025	The Hand That Rocks the Cradle	Yes	No	No	

=== Television ===
Year	Title	Director	Writer	Notes
2022	Marea alta	Yes	No	3 episodes
2023	La Hora Marcada	Yes	Yes	Episode: "La Mano"

=== Other credits ===
Year	Title	Role	Notes
2015	La Pascualita	Sound recordist	Short film
2017	Juan Carlos Escalante: Mi abuelo es mi primo	Camera operator	TV special
2021	Los Días Francos	Additional script writing	
2025	Efímera	Additional script writing	

== Accolades ==
Huesera: The Bone Woman premiered at the Tribeca Festival in New York, USA, where the director won the award for Best New Narrative Direction and the Nora Ephron Award, which recognizes filmmakers with a unique voice.

At the Sitges International Fantastic Film Festival in Spain, the film won the award for Best Ibero-American Film, while Michelle Garza won the Citizen Kane award for new director. In 2022, Garza Cervera also won Best Director at the Feratum International Fantastic Film Festival, where the film won the Audience Award and the Feratum Tower for Best Horror Feature Film in the Ibero-American Section.

At the 20th Morelia International Film Festival, Huesera won the Audience Award for Best Mexican Feature Film. It also won Best Film in the Crazies section of the Torino Film Festival, reaching 35 awards during its time at festivals.
