= 2024 Premios Aura =

Premios Aura
- Awarded for: Excellence in television series in spanish language for streaming platforms
- Country: Mexico
- Presented by: FCO Group
- Eligibility: television series in spanish premiered on streaming platforms in Latin America
- First award: 2024

Highlights
- Most wins: Vgly
- Website: https://www.auraseries.com/

The 2024 Premios Aura (Aura awards) was the first edition of the award presentation for excellence in Spanish-language television series for streaming platforms. The award ceremony was held in Frontón Mexico on 3 July 2024. A lifetime achievement award, named Leyenda (Legend) was presented to Eugenio Derbez.

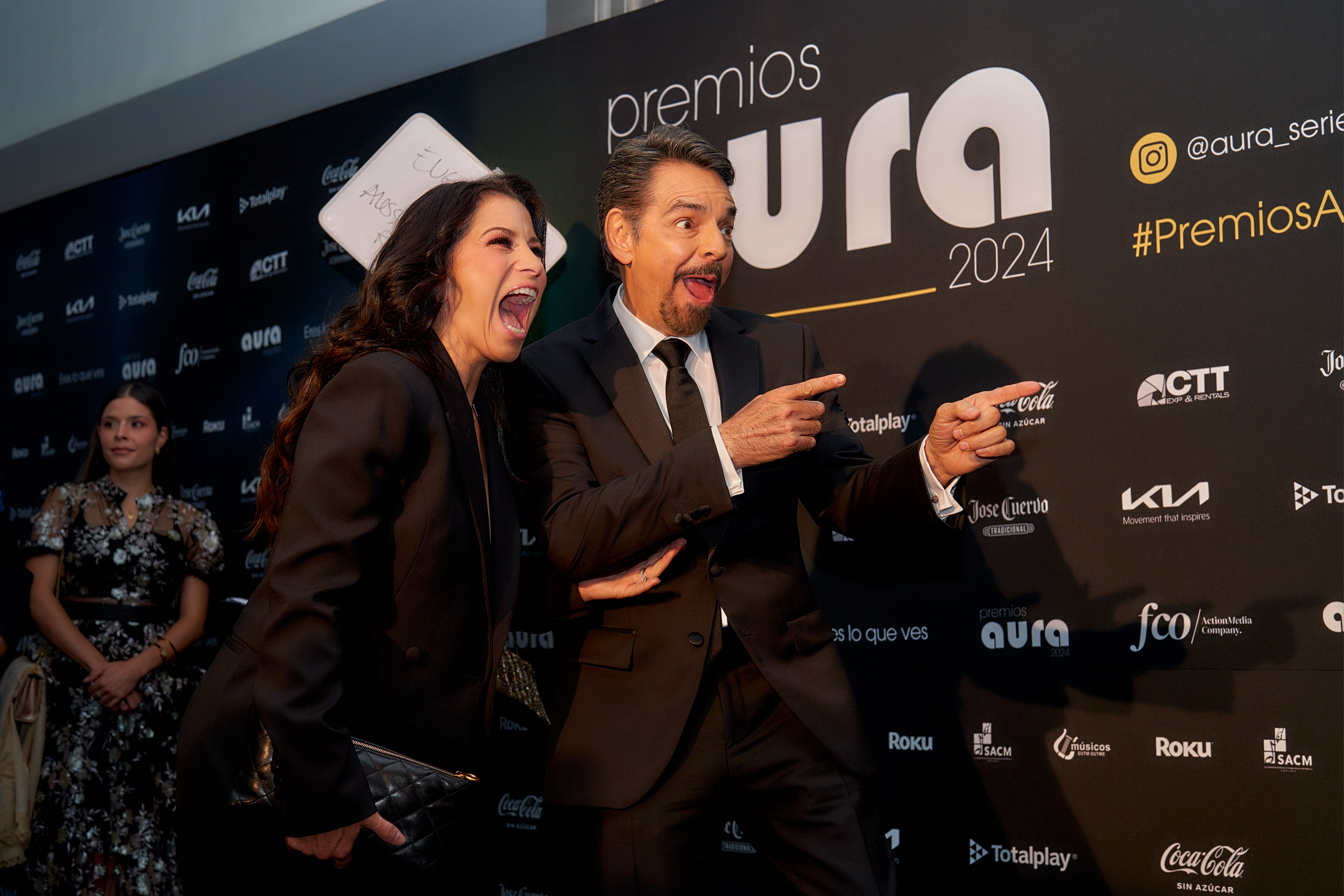
Eugenio Derbez and Alessandra Rosado at the 2024 Premios Aura award ceremony

== Winners and nominees ==
Best Drama Series: Winner: Vgly Nominees: Barrabrava; Los Billis; The Cry of the Butterflies; 30 Coins; Las pelotaris 1926	Best Comedy Series: Winner: Ojitos de Huevo Nominees: Harina (season 2); División Palermo; Nada; Un buen divorcio
Best Documentary Series: Winner: El Show. Crónica de un asesinato (The show. Chronicle of a murder; documentary about the assassination of Paco Stanley. Nominees: La hija de dios: Dalma Maradona; El Apóstol; Libre de reir; Cristóbal Balenciaga	Best Acting in Drama Series: Winner: Pedro Alonso (Berlin) Nominees: Luis Gerardo Méndez (Los enviados); Irene Azuela (The Widows of Thursdays); Benny Emmanuel (Vgly); Omar Chaparro (The Widows of Thursdays); Zuria Vega (Las Pelotaris 1926)
Best Acting in Comedy Series: Winner: Memo Villegas – Harina Nominees: Paulina Gaitan – P#t@s redes sociales; Santiago Korovsky – División Palermo; Guillermo Francella – El encargado; Alberto Guerra – El Mantequilla; Claudia Alvarez – Un buen divorcio	Best Acting in Supporting Role: Winner: Verónica Bravo (Harina) Nominees: Juan Daniel García Treviño (Vgly); Juan Pablo Medina (The Widows of Thursdays); Mónica Gonzaga (Barrabrava); Kike Vázquez (Ojitos de Huevo); Megan Montaner (30 coins season 2)
International hispanic talent: Cristina Rodlo (Halo season 2); Pedro Pascal (The Mandalorian season 3); Taz Skylar (One Piece); Paulina Dávila (Griselda); Eiza González (3 Body Problem); Iñaki Godoy (One Piece); Sofia Vergara (Griselda)	Best Acting Debut: Iván Hochman (El amor después del amor); Alexis Arroyo (Ojitos de Huevo); Julián Zuluaga (Los Billis); Paola Fernández (Ojitos de Huevo); Sasha González (Vgly); Michelle Pellicer (Cindy la Regia)
Best Cast: Winner: Pacto de silencio Nominees: El juego de las llaves 3rd season; The Widows of Thursdays; División Palermo; Vgly; 30 Coins; Las pelotaris 1926	Best Script Writing: Winner: Vgly Nominees: No Traces; El elegido; The Cry of the Butterflies; El amor después del amor; Las pelotaris 1926
Best Director: Winners: Juan Felipe Cano and Mateo Stivelberg (Los Billis) Nominees: Salvador Espinoza (Harina, season 2); Pato Safa and Analeine Cal y Mayor (Ojitos de Huevo); Humberto Hinojosa (Widows of the Thursdays); Jerónimo Carranza, Emanuel Diez, Diego Biffeld, Gastón Duprat & Mariano Cohn (El encargado); Sebastián Sariñana, Santiago Fábregas and Cris Gris (Vgly); Jesús Rodrigo (Las pelotaris 1926)	Best Pilot: Winner: Las Pelotaris 1926 Nominees: Ojitos de Huevo; División Palermo; El encargado; Los Billis
Highest Impact: Winner: Ojitos de Huevo Nominees: Berlin; Pacto de silencio; Harina, season 2; Vgly; Lalola	Best Executive Producer: Winner: Vgly Nominees: Ojitos de Huevo; Los Pelotaris 1926; Harina season 2; División Palermo; 30 Coins season 2
Lifetime Achievement: Winner: Eugenio Derbez
