= Y llegaron de noche =

- Genre: Workplace comedy
- Created by: Rob Greenberg; Bob Fisher
- Showrunner: Eugenio Derbez
- Starring: Eugenio Derbez; Sofía Niño de Rivera; AJ Vaage; Yare Santana; Laura Ferretti; Diana Bovio
- Composer: Tomás Barreiro Guijosa
- Country of origin: Mexico
- Original language: Spanish
- No. of seasons: 1
- No. of episodes: 7

Production
- Executive producers: Ben Odell; Eugenio Derbez; Javier Williams; Pablo Calasso
- Producers: Paul Drago; Moisés Dayán
- Editor: Eugenio Richer
- Production company: 3Pas Studios

Original release
- Network: Vix
- Release: 4 October – 25 October 2024

Y llegaron de noche is a Mexican television comedy series created by Rob Greenberg and Bob Fisher that revolves around the production of the 1931 Spanish-language version of Dracula, which was concurrently produced with the English-language version. The series stars Eugenio Derbez, Sofía Niño de Rivera, AJ Vaage, Yare Santana, Laura Ferretti and Diana Bovio. It premiered on Vix on 4 October 2024.

== Cast ==
- Eugenio Derbez as Carlos Villarías
- Sofía Niño de Rivera as Cecilia Ramírez
- AJ Vaage as Paul Kohner
- Yare Santana as Lupita Tovar
- Laura Ferretti as María
- Diana Bovio as Carmen Guerrero
- Manuel "Flaco" Ibáñez as Eduardo Arozamena
- Fernando Memije as José Soriano Viosca
- Jerry Velázquez as Pablo Álvarez Rubio
- Federico Espejo as Alfredo Birabén
- Yany Prado as Amelia
- John Goodrich as George Melford
- Daniel Sosa as Jesús
- Rafael Cebrián as Miguel Barreto
- Giovanna Romo as Geraldine
- Carmen Ramos as Elena
- Daniel Raymont as Bela Lugosi
- Jason Alexander as Carl Laemmle
- Antonio Fortier as Bernardo
- Cal Butler as Carl Laemmle Jr.

== Episodes ==
No.	Title	Directed by	Original release date
1	"Drácula en español"	Eugenio Derbez	4 October 2024
2	"Soy Drácula"	Ale Damiani	4 October 2024
3	"Beso de vampiro"	Jorge Ulloa	11 October 2024
4	"El vampiro triste"	Luis Felipe Ybarra	11 October 2024
5	"El reflejo del vampiro"	Alejandro Damiani	18 October 2024
6	"Los muertos y los no-muertos"	Jorge Ulloa	18 October 2024
7	"La muerte de un vampiro"	Eugenio Derbez	25 October 2024

== Awards and nominations ==
Year	Award	Category	Nominee	Result	Ref.
2025	Premios Aura	Best Comedy Series	Y llegaron de noche	Won	
2025	Premios Aura	Best Acting in Comedy	Eugenio Derbez	Nominated	
2025	Premios Aura	Best Acting in Supporting Role	Diana Bovio	Nominated	
2025	Premios Aura	Best Acting Debut	Yare Santana	Nominated	
2025	Produ Awards	Best Comedy Series Fusion of Styles	Y llegaron de noche	Won	
2025	Produ Awards	Best Lead Actor - Comedy Series Fusion of Styles	Eugenio Derbez	Nominated	
2025	Produ Awards	Best Supporting Actress - Comedy Series Fusion of Styles	Sofía Niño de Rivera	Nominated	
2025	Produ Awards	Best Directing - Comedy Series	Eugenio Derbez	Nominated	
2025	Produ Awards	Best Showrunner - Comedy Series	Eugenio Derbez	Nominated	
2025	Produ Awards	Best Producer - Comedy Series	Eugenio Derbez, Ben Odell, Javier Williams & Pablo Calasso	Won	
2025	Produ Awards	Best Cinematography	Alejo Chauvin	Nominated	
2025	Produ Awards	Best Art Direction	Sandra Cabriada	Nominated	
2025	Produ Awards	Best Period Recreation	Gabriela Fernández	Nominated	
2025	Produ Awards	Best Content Under Sustainable Production	Y llegaron de noche	Nominated	
2025	International Emmy Awards	Best Comedy Series	Y llegaron de noche	Nominated	
