= 2025 Premios Aura =

Premios Aura
- Awarded for: Excellence in television series in spanish language for streaming platforms
- Country: Mexico
- Presented by: FCO Group
- Eligibility: television series in spanish premiered on streaming platforms in Latin America
- First award: 2024
- Website: https://www.auraseries.com/

The 2025 Premios Aura (Aura awards) is the second edition of the award presentation for excellence in Spanish-language television series for streaming platforms. Eligible were series premiered on streaming platforms and fully available between 1 March 2024 and 1 January 2025. The award ceremony took place on 6 April 2025. The Colombian TV series One hundred years of solitude won two awards, the same as the Mexican production Like Water fo Chocolate.

== Winners and nominees ==
Best Drama Series: Winner: Like Water for Chocolate Nominees: El secreto del río; Nadie nos va a extrañar; Cada minuto cuenta; One Hundred Years of Solitude; Midnight Family; Secuestro del vuelo 601	Best Comedy Series: Winner: Y llegaron de noche Nominees: Profe infiltrado; Bellas Artes (TV series); Somos oro; El encargado; Consuelo; Coppola, el representante
Best Documentary Series: Winner: Lebaron; Muerte en tierra prometida Nominees: Los 43 de Ayotzinapa: Un crimen de estado; Checo Pérez; El portal: Historia oculta de zona divas; Angel di María: Romper la pared; Lucrecia: un crimen de odio	Best Acting in Drama Series: Winner: Diego Luna (La màquina) Nominees: Roberto Duarte (Who killed him?); Diego Calva (El secreto del rio); Nicole Wallace (Raising Voices); Mariana di Girolamo (Vencer o morir); Mónica Lopera (Secuestro del vuelo 601); Oscar Benavides (Cada minuto cuenta)
Best Acting in Comedy Series: Winner:Cassandra Sánchez Navarro (Consuelo) Nominees: Eugenio Derbez (Y llegaron de noche); Susana Alexander (Mama Cake); Juan Minujín (Coppola, el representante); Griselda Siciliani (Envious); Delfina Chaves (Felices los 6); Oscar Martínez (Bellas Artes)	Best Acting in Supporting Role: Winner: Christian Tappan (El secuestro del vuelo 601) Nominees: Ana Valeria Becerril (Like Water for Chocolate); Irene Azuela (Like Water for Chocolate); Alberto Guerra (The Accident); Clara Galle (Raising Voices); Nicolás Furtado (Vencer o morir); Diana Bovio (Y llegaron de noche)
Hispanic presence in international series: Winner: Javier Bardem (Monsters) Nominees: Nava Mau (Baby Reindeer); Manuel García-Rulfo (The Lincoln Lawyer); Delfina Chaves (Máxima); Ursula Corberó (El Chacal); Dafne Keen (The Acolyte)	Best Acting Debut: Winner: Axel Madrazo (Nadie nos va a extrañar) Nominees: Amorita Rasgado (Las Azules); Frida Sofía (El secreto del rio); Yare Santana (Y llegaron de noche); Manu Rios (Breathless); Trinidad González (El secreto del rio); Renata Vaca (Midnight Family)
Best Cast: Winner: Las Azules Nominees: The Accident; One hundred years of solitude; Who Killed Him?; Midnight Family; Like Water for Chocolate; La voz ausente	Best Script: Winner: El secreto del río Nominees: One hundred years of solitude; Midnight Family; Nadie nos va a extrañar; Bank Under Siege; Envious; Secuestro del vuelo 601
Best Directing: Winner: Like Water for Chocolate Nominees: Las Azules; Midnight Family; One hundred years of solitude; Coppola, el representante; Cada minuto cuenta; Tengo que morir todas las noches	Best Season start: Winner:Vencer o morir Nominees: One hundred years of solitude; Cada minuto cuenta; Secuestro del vuelo 601; Bank Under Siege; The Accident; Coppola, el representante
Highest Impact: Winner: One hundred years of solitude Nominees: Raising Voices; Like Water for Chocolate; Secuestro del vuelo 601; Yo soy Betty, la Fea; Coppola, el representante; Nadie nos va a extrañar	Best Executive Producer: Winner:One hundred years of solitude Nominees: Like Water for Chocolate; Cada minuto cuenta; 1992; Consuelo; Bank Under Siege; Vencer o morir
Lifetime Achievement: Winner: Manolo Caro
