= Alta marea =

Alta marea (Italian for 'High Tide') may refer to:

- "Alta marea", a 1991 song by Antonello Venditti, an Italian-language cover of "Don't Dream It's Over"
- "Alta marea", a 2023 single by Coez and Frah Quintale

== See also ==
- Marea alta
