= Turbia (TV series) =

- Genre: Drama
- Created by: Oscar Ruiz Navia; Carlos Moreno; César Augusto Acevedo; William Vega; Jorge Navas; Santiago Lozano; Alonso Torres
- Composer: Felipe Bravo
- Country of origin: Colombia
- Original language: Spanish
- No. of seasons: 1
- No. of episodes: 6

Production
- Executive producers: Ana María Ruiz Navia; Oscar Ruiz Navia; Paola Andrea Pérez Nieto; Emmanuel Cely Palencia; César Galvis
- Editor: Paul Donneys
- Production companies: Contravía Films; Inercia Películas; Telepacífico; Blond Indian Films; 2.35 Digital; Gatoencerrado Films

Original release
- Network: Vix+
- Release: 25 August 2022

Turbia is a Colombian streaming television series that premiered on Vix+ on 25 August 2022. Set in Cali, Colombia, the series centers on an environmental and social crisis due to water shortages resulting from a drought of several months.

== Plot ==
In Cali, a drought has caused the city to go into crisis. Despite harsh conditions, the citizens carry on with their daily lives. A privileged zone houses the wealthiest and powerful citizens, while the "dry zone" houses the rest of the population. The dry zone lacks drinkable water and is reaching the highest levels of violence and corruption.

== Episodes ==
No.	Title	Directed by	Written by	Original release date
1	"Warer"	Oscar Ruiz Navia	Óscar Ruiz Navia & César Augusto Acevedo	25 August 2022
Cast: Serena Hebenstreit Alvarado, Juan Sánchez, Mario Bolaños, Miguel Ángel Viera, Rodrigo Vélez
2	"Carrotanque"	Carlos Moreno	Alonso Torres & Carlos Moreno	25 August 2022
Cast: Álvaro Rodríguez, Gladis Donado, Kevin Muñoz, Milton Tobar, Román Arias, Jorge Vanessa, Harold de Vasten
3	"Desalojo"	César Augusto Acevedo	César Augusto Acevedo	25 August 2022
Cast: Juan Carlos Martínez, Héctor Mejía, Ariel Martínez, Francia Márquez, Sara Eliza Ávila, Edwin Aguilar, Jorge Landazuri
4	"Día cero"	William Vega	Alonso Torres & Oscar Ruiz Navia	25 August 2022
Cast: Raul Estrada, Mario Bolaños, Ángela García, Miguel Ángel Viera, Juan Carlos Martínez, Luisa Fernanda Arias, Lucía Amaya
5	"Laberinto"	Jorge Navas	Genny Cuervo, Oscar Ruiz Navia & Jorge Navas	25 August 2022
Cast: Miguel Ángel Viera, Juan Carlos Martínez, Francisco Cucalón, Wendy Betancourt, Kevin Muñoz, Milton Tobar, Román Arias, Antonio Arroyo
6	"Refugio"	Santiago Lozano	Alonso Torres, Genny Cuervo, Oscar Ruiz Navia & Carlos Téllez	25 August 2022
Cast: Mario Bolaños, Serena Hebenstreit Alvarado, Liliana Montes, John Alex Castillo, Alcardo Bonilla, Rubén Prado, Victoria González
