= La bella y las bestias =

Mexican television series

- Genre: Drama
- Created by: Juan Camilo Ferrand
- Written by: Juan Camilo Ferrand; Ana Bolena Meléndez
- Screenplay by: Jorge Cervantes
- Story by: Juan Camilo Ferrand
- Directed by: Poncho Pineda; Alfonso Pineda Ulloa; Rolando Campo
- Starring: Esmeralda Pimentel; Osvaldo Benavides; Cassandra Sánchez Navarro; Arturo Barba; Jorge Alberti; Sebastián Martínez; Sebastián Ferrat; Víctor Civeira; Jaume Mateu; Elizabeth Minotta; Ari Telch; Guillermo Quintanilla; Leticia Huijara; Francisco de la O; Aylín Mújica; Jessica Mas; Alejandro Ávila; Lorena Meritano; Fermín Martínez; Macarena Achaga
- Opening theme: "La bella y las bestias" by Fanny Lu
- Country of origin: United States
- Original language: Spanish
- No. of seasons: 1
- No. of episodes: 66

Production
- Executive producer: Patricio Wills
- Producer: Jorge Sastoque Roa
- Editor: Alba Merchán Hamann
- Production companies: W Studios; Lemons Films

Original release
- Network: Univision
- Release: 12 June – 10 September 2018

La bella y las bestias is a Spanish-language television series that follows the life of Isabela León, a beautiful and hard-working woman who returns to Mexico with a goal: to find those responsible who murdered her parents years ago. It is produced by W Studios and Lemons Films for Univision and Televisa and premiered on 12 June 2018, concluding on 10 September 2018. It is an original series created and developed by Juan Camilo Ferrand that consists of eighty episodes. It stars Esmeralda Pimentel and Osvaldo Benavides.

== Plot ==
The series revolves around Isabela León (Esmeralda Pimentel), a beautiful young girl whose parents were murdered by a group of white-collar criminals when she was a minor. After reaching the age of majority, Isabela, with great resentment, decides to take charge of her situation and face the murderers of her parents, whom she calls Bestias, members of high society, who hide their crimes under facades of legal businesses or activities. In the company of her great fighting companions, Mike (Jorge Alberti) and Penélope (Cassandra Sánchez Navarro), Isabela returns from Los Angeles to Mexico to hunt, one by one, the Bestias that do not stop enjoying the honeys of impunity.

== Cast and characters ==
=== Main characters ===
- Esmeralda Pimentel as Isabela León:
  better known as Bela by her relatives, she is a young Mexican woman and more importantly the daughter of Enrique León. Isabela practices mixed martial arts and knows how to handle weapons. After the death of her parents and the kidnapping of her best friend María. Isabela begins to find a way to prepare to destroy all those who destroyed her life, this is how she meets Juan Pablo son of Armando Quintero, one of the main people in charge of ordering the death of his father Enrique, thanks to Juan Pablo who he teaches Isabela a video, she manages to recognize the murderers of her parents and begins to call them Bestias. So with the help of Penélope and Mike begins to train and together with them two begin to create a plan to end Las Bestias.
- Osvaldo Benavides as Juan Pablo Quintero:
  He is the son of Armando and Gloria Quintero, and the older brother of Emilia Quintero. Juan Pablo suffers from constant abuse and humiliation from his father, since he wants to turn him into a murderer and a corrupt businessman. Juan Pablo out of resentment records a video of his father and his partners in which he shows how everyone orders the death of Enrique León. After this he decides to give notice to the authorities, but it is too late. During his imprisonment in the vault where his father keeps all his money, he meets Isabela and helps her discover who was responsible for the death of his family. Upon finding his father dead, Juan Pablo decides to enter the recruitment to be a federal police officer.
- Cassandra Sánchez Navarro as Penélope Zapata:
  She is a young woman who practices boxing with Mike and lives in the orphanage where Emanuel takes Isabela to live. When she meets Isabela, she starts to treat her badly, but one day during lunch, she starts to fight with some companions and Isabela decides to help her. After this Penelope decides to help Isabela in her plan of revenge against those who murdered her family.
- Arturo Barba as Emanuel Espitia:
  He is Isabela's godfather, and the director of the Interpol. He is known as Bestia 8, although his identity remains a secret to Isabela. He is another of those who ordered the death of Enrique León, he uses his work as director of the Interpol to do illicit business. He maintained a hidden relationship with María, Isabela's friend, and left her pregnant.
- Jorge Alberti as Mike:
  He is a former Navy Marine of the United States expert in mixed martial arts and Machiavellian mind that helps Isabela to train for the battle that awaits her against the Beasts that in the past murdered her parents. Mike has a gym where only men practice since he is prohibited from women training in his gym because his wife was killed while practicing.
- Sebastián Martínez as Antonio José Ramos: Better known as El Colombiano or Bestia 4. Behind his facade as a happy and amusing immigrant who pretends to be an importer and exporter of Colombian underwear is a man who is dedicated to the trafficking of women.
- Sebastián Ferrat as Ignacio Vega: He is the father of Daniel and Marcia Vega. Also better known as Bestia 6 or El Cafetero. Owner of huge amounts of land where he grows coffee, which he himself exports and distributes throughout the Mexican Republic, enjoys killing the weak.
- Víctor Civeira as Ricardo
- Jaume Mateu as Simón Narváez: He is Juan Pablo's partner during his training as a recruit to be a federal police officer. He and Juan Pablo are in charge of destroying Las Bestias.
- Elizabeth Minotta as Andrea
- Ari Telch as Armando Quintero: Better known as Bestia 1 is the father of Juan Pablo and Emilia Quintero. He often recruits beautiful women, including famous actresses or hostesses, to seduce them with their money and get them to agree to sleep with him.
- Guillermo Quintanilla as Abelardo Zea: Better known as Bestia 7. It is the senator of the Mexican Republic is an unscrupulous man who wants to become president at all costs.
- Leticia Huijara as Gloria Quintero: She is the mother of Juan Pablo and Emilia Quintero. She is the wife of Armando Quintero, Gloria is an alcoholic who takes due to the problems she faces with her family.
- Francisco de la O as Horacio Hernández: Better known as Bestia 2. He is the corrupt president of a delegation in Mexico City.
- Aylín Mújica as Roberta "La Madame" González: Better known as Bestia 3. She owns an escort service, is a woman full of aesthetic surgeries that is obsessed with beauty and youth.
- Jessica Mas as Isadora Hernández "La Joyera": Better known as Bestia 5. Her life changed years ago when she married a millionaire man and owner of a jewelry chain that she ends up inheriting and later using to launder money.
- Fermín Martínez as Ernesto Acosta "El Cástor": He is an assassin who worked for Armando Quintero, and by orders of him he murdered Isabela's parent.
- Macarena Achaga as Emilia Quintero

=== Recurring characters ===
- Alejandro Durán as Norman, he is the companion of El Cástor, he started working for Armando Quintero, but then he and El Cástro decided to start working for Emanuel, who makes them partners of the casino.
- Jessica Díaz as María, is the best friend of Isabela, after his kidnapping it is revealed that she was pregnant. But Emanuel, realizing this, decides to keep her kidnapped and then murders her.
- David Palacio as Daniel Vega, Ignacio's nephew.
- Ivana de María as Marcia Vega, Ignacio's daughter.
- Raúl Olivo as Jorge
- Sofía Blanchet as Veronica Roldán

== Production ==
The production of the series began on June 26, 2017. Altair Jarabo was initially chosen as the female lead in the series, but later for unknown reasons, Televisa announced that the female lead would be Esmeralda Pimentel.

== Ratings ==
Viewership and ratings per season of La bella y las bestias
Season	Episodes	First aired		Last aired		Avg. viewers (millions)
Season	Episodes	Date	Viewers (millions)	Date	Viewers (millions)	Avg. viewers (millions)
1	66	12 June 2018	1.60	10 September 2018	1.74	1.38

== Episodes ==
No.	Title	Original release date	US viewers (millions)
1	"Chapter 1"	12 June 2018	1.60
Enrique successfully carries out the operation to discover Quintero's business. Juan Pablo learns that Quintero and his partners want to eliminate Enrique. Quintero's men kidnap Enrique and murder his wife.
2	"Chapter 2"	13 June 2018	1.69
The kidnapping of Enrique's family goes out of control and Bela witnesses the death of his parents. Bela seeks to save María and attacks Armando in her casino, but things do not go as planned and she stays locked with Juan Pablo.
3	"Chapter 3"	14 June 2018	1.70
Juan Pablo feels guilty and gives Bela a video with the truth about his father's death. Emanuel advises Armando on how to proceed with respect to Bela and his men, but executes a plan behind his back.
4	"Chapter 4"	15 June 2018	1.40
The family of Juan Pablo has to deal with the death of Armando. Bela begins to investigate the identity of Armando's associates to collect revenge. Emanuel assaults Bela and Juan Pablo to force her to leave Mexico.
5	"Chapter 5"	18 June 2018	1.76
Juan Pablo decides to become a federal policeman. Mike begins to train Bela to help her in her plan of revenge. Emanuel is responsible for disappearing María and gives Norman and Cástor part of the Quintero casino.
6	"Chapter 6"	19 June 2018	1.73
Bela helps Penélope in her revenge for what she was done as a child. Juan Pablo is looking for a way to open an investigation against Cástor. Emanuel retires from the casino society.
7	"Chapter 7"	20 June 2018	1.65
The revenge plan starts and the first step is to steal the Cástor's casino, Bela infiltrates to investigate the movements and give the blow. Juan Pablo and the Federal Police find the Cástor's drug shipment.
8	"Chapter 8"	21 June 2018	1.57
The Castor escapes from the Federal Police and hides in his ranch, Bela finds a way to get his attention. Juan Pablo suspects that Bela is trying to do justice and keeps her under surveillance.
9	"Chapter 9"	22 June 2018	1.64
The race to catch the Castor begins. The plans of Bela and Juan Pablo suffer a drastic change due to the presence of Norman in the ranch and nothing goes as they expect.
10	"Chapter 10"	25 June 2018	1.66
Bela is in danger due to the locator that Juan Pablo put in her suitcase. Penelope and Mike share an intimate moment. The operation goes wrong and Felipe pays the consequences. Juan Pablo discovers that his kidnapper is Norman.
11	"Chapter 11"	26 June 2018	1.98
Bela executes her revenge plan against the Castor, but Norman catches her. Patricia learns that Emilia has not been attending college. Ricardo informs Emanuel of Bela's presence at Castor’s ranch.
12	"Chapter 12"	27 June 2018	1.66
Bela tells Emanuel that she is willing to do justice by her own hands over the group that had her parents killed. Junior decides to look for Bela to kill her. Emanuel meets with Norman to try to help him.
13	"Chapter 13"	28 June 2018	1.67
Juan Pablo is sincere with Bela and they kiss. Junior enters Bela's house to kill her, but she removes him first. Due to a call, the Federal Police finds out about the connection between Norman and Junior, Emanuel has to take care of the matter.
14	"Chapter 14"	29 June 2018	1.57
Emanuel assumes custody of Norman to keep him under control. Juan Pablo ends with Teresa because of how he feels about Bela. Horacio calls a meeting of the company to determine the fate of Norman.
15	"Chapter 15"	2 July 2018	1.34
The Society and Bela set up a separate operation to kill Norman, but Emanuel's intervention changes everything. Emilia starts working as an assistant to Emanuel.
16	"Chapter 16"	3 July 2018	1.36
Bela and her team seek Horacio's weak point. Mike meets Mauricio, leader of a movement against the mayor. Bela and his team enter Horacio's house to kill him, but Mauricio's presence jeopardizes the mission.
17	"Chapter 17"	4 July 2018	1.03
Mireya dies and Juan Pablo gets involved in the investigation against Mauricio. Bela begins to approach Horacio and uses a disguise to infiltrate his house.
18	"Chapter 18"	5 July 2018	1.47
Juan Pablo and Bela confess what they feel. Juan Pablo asks Bela for help with Mireya's case, but Ricardo is opposed. Bela continues her plan to approach Horacio, but the presence of Juan Pablo puts her mission at risk.
19	"Chapter 19"	6 July 2018	1.37
Ricardo demands Juan Pablo to stay away from Bela. Horacio's men attack against Mauricio and his people. Juan Pablo does not find evidence to implicate Horacio in the death of Mireya and Mauricio.
20	"Chapter 20"	9 July 2018	1.31
The relationship between Juan Pablo and Bela becomes stronger. Horacio introduces Bela to the members of the Society. Horacio tells his associates that the Federal Police is investigating him, but they do not seem to support him.
21	"Chapter 21"	10 July 2018	1.38
The investigation into Julian's lynching continues and the first to fall are Horacio's men. Bela attacks Horacio before he tries to kill her, a violent mob breaks into his house and the mayor is lynched.
22	"Chapter 22"	11 July 2018	1.40
Juan Pablo asks Bela to allow him to catch the members of the society, but she continues with her revenge and begins the plan to infiltrate the life of the Madame and make her fall.
23	"Chapter 23"	12 July 2018	1.38
Bela attacks the vanity of the Madame and manages to place herself in her car agency. Emilia is missing and Emanuel desperately seeks her. The Madame asks Emanuel to investigate the identity of Bela's alias.
24	"Chapter 24"	13 July 2018	1.20
Simón interrogates Penelope about her stepfather's death. Bela places several microphones in Madame's house, but Omar's attack forces her to leave the place. Madame dismisses Bela from the agency.
25	"Chapter 25"	16 July 2018	1.27
Bela recommends Penelope to be part of the Madame Girls. Juan Pablo still believes that Bela and Penelope are suspects in Horacio's case. The former employees of the Madame try to demand their compensation.
26	"Chapter 26"	17 July 2018	1.31
Bela meets with Omar to approach him and investigate more about his past. Mike confesses to Penelope that he likes her, but that he can not sustain a relationship with her. Juan Pablo is disappointed to discover Bela in the Madame's agency.
27	"Chapter 27"	18 July 2018	1.34
Due to the suspicions of Juan Pablo and Simón, Madame and Omar begin to suspect of Bela and Penelope. Mike and Bela manage to intervene in Madame's computer but he advises her that it is best to withdraw from the mission.
28	"Chapter 28"	19 July 2018	1.31
The Madame believes that Penelope is allied with the Federal Police and Omar is responsible for following them. Bela continues with her plan to make Madame believe that Mike is a successful dermatologist. Bela and her team steal a shipment of cars.
29	"Chapter 29"	20 July 2018	1.40
Mike and Bela empty the account of the Madame and prepare to give her the rejuvenating treatment. Penelope is kidnapped and Omar is responsible for torturing her. Juan Pablo and Simón are surprised to find the stolen cars.
30	"Chapter 30"	23 July 2018	1.42
Bela causes the Madame to commit suicide by leaving her disfigured. The members of the Society begin to feel paranoid and believe that the culprit of the deaths is one of them. Bela causes Juan Pablo to be fired from the Federal Police.
31	"Chapter 31"	24 July 2018	1.35
The members of the Society make sure that Juan Pablo is not a threat to them. The Society intends to take advantage of the relationship between Emilia and Emanuel. Juan Pablo decides to join the hunting of the beasts.
32	"Chapter 32"	25 July 2018	1.23
Penelope is not comfortable with the way Bela is leading the mission since she is not making any profit. Juan Pablo appears before Antonio to ask for work. Antonio sends his trusted wife, Andrea, to approach Emilia.
33	"Chapter 33"	26 July 2018	1.23
34	"Chapter 34"	26 July 2018	1.04
Bela arrives at Antonio's company to apply as an administrative assistant. Antonio plans to test Juan Pablo to make him commit a crime. Emmanuel and Emilia announce their relationship to Juan Pablo and Bela. Bela is rejected by Antonio's company and Penelope takes her place. Bela and Antonio are jealous of the chemistry between Andrea and Juan Pablo. Andrea orders Juan Pablo to get false identifications for some models.
35	"Chapter 35"	27 July 2018	1.19
36	"Chapter 36"	27 July 2018	1.00
Emanuel meets with the Society to demand the return of Emilia's casino shares. Antonio takes Verónica and Susy to his house to select one of them as the tenth model that he promised to Andrea. Bela travels to Colombia to obtain information about one of the missing models and discovers Antonio's way of operating, while Verónica is about to suffer the same fate as the other models.
37	"Chapter 37"	30 July 2018	1.30
Bela discovers that Andrea helped Alejandra escape from the brothel where Antonio has the other models locked up. Antonio's men attack Bela and Alejandra. The teams of Bela and Juan Pablo decide to work together.
38	"Chapter 38"	31 July 2018	1.14
Bela tries to get political asylum for Alejandra. Jamachi presses Simon to tell him the truth about the Colombian's case. Andrea begins to monitor Penelope and investigate about the woman who has been hanging around the Society.
39	"Chapter 39"	1 August 2018	1.26
Andrea begins to suspect that Bela and Isabella from Colombia are the same person. The situation becomes complicated for Juan Pablo when Antonio turns him into his security chief and takes him to his brothel.
40	"Chapter 40"	2 August 2018	1.32
Veronica ends up drowned after arguing with Susi for Antonio's photos. The Society officially welcomes Emilia to their circle. Juan Pablo asks Yamile to help him in order to save the brothel models.
41	"Chapter 41"	3 August 2018	1.20
Antonio asks Emanuel for help to get rid of Verónica's body, while Susi ends up in the brothel. Due to Andrea's suspicions, Bela's team withdrew from the mission. Ricardo detains Andrea to put pressure on Antonio.
42	"Chapter 42"	6 August 2018	1.27
Antonio is desperate to free Andrea from the federals and turns to Juan Pablo, who asks him to return to his business as a partner. Bela discovers that Emanuel has a connection to the Society.
43	"Chapter 43"	7 August 2018	1.32
Juan Pablo asks Antonio to let him be Susi's first client and puts Pascual to watch over them. Andrea tries to convince Antonio that Juan Pablo is looking to hurt him and stops him. Emanuel warns Isabela that she may be in danger.
44	"Chapter 44"	8 August 2018	1.27
Juan Pablo manages to communicate with Simón and sends the location of the brothel. The final confrontation between Bela and Antonio takes place inside the tiger cage. Bela gives Andrea another chance and Emanuel arrives at Antonio's house.
45	"Chapter 45"	9 August 2018	1.17
Bela is affected after knowing what Juan Pablo had to do to save the models. Cristina meets Emilia to give her a welcome gift. Emilia has her first meeting with the society and makes a mistake.
46	"Chapter 46"	10 August 2018	1.24
Juan Pablo looks for the way that Andrea cooperates with the Federal Police and offers immunity. Cristina begins to get tired of having to take care of Carlos, her husband. A person from the past reappears in Mike's life.
47	"Chapter 47"	13 August 2018	1.22
Juan Pablo and Andrea travel to Colombia to reconnect with the models. Cristina begins to show interest to Jorge, one of her employees. Hector commits suicide leaving Mike tormented by his death. Bela comes in contact with Cristina.
48	"Chapter 48"	14 August 2018	1.29
Bela decides not to hide anymore and presents herself directly to Cristina to intimidate her. Emanuel asks Emilia for marriage. Emanuel discovers that Bela has evidence against the society.
49	"Chapter 49"	15 August 2018	1.24
Cristina sends Jorge to attack Bela and Mike ends up in the hospital. Penelope goes to work as Carlos's nurse. Juan Pablo tries to convince Emilia of the mistake she is making by marrying Emanuel and keeping the casino's shares.
50	"Chapter 50"	16 August 2018	1.25
Patricia tries to find evidence against Emanuel. Cristina shows Abelardo and Ignacio the video that Bela gave her and they realize that she is responsible for the death of the other members, so they ask Emanuel for help to stop her.
51	"Chapter 51"	17 August 2018	1.07
Juan Pablo puts Bela under arrest for Antonio's death in order to keep her under surveillance. Emanuel seeks a test to link Bela with the death of one of the partners. Cristina continues with her attempts to seduce Jorge.
52	"Chapter 52"	20 August 2018	1.26
Mike demands that Bela overcome her break up with Juan Pablo in order to continue with the plan. Patricia shows a couple of tests to Emilia so that she realizes that Emanuel had business with his father. Carlos asks Cristina for a divorce.
53	"Chapter 53"	21 August 2018	1.40
Bela puts into action her plan against Cristina and interrupts Juan Pablo's operation. Emilia talks to Patricia about how she feels about Emanuel. Penelope generates chaos at Carlos's house by exposing Jorge's deception.
54	"Chapter 54"	22 August 2018	1.40
Bela takes Cristina inside her own mine leaving her without air. Mike asks Simon for help in rescuing Penelope. Abelardo discovers that Ignacio and his family are engaged in collecting immigrants to later hunt them.
55	"Chapter 55"	23 August 2018	1.40
The remaining members of the Society seek to divert Bela's attention and Ignacio decides to appear before her. Emilia terrified by what she has discovered about the partners tells Emanuel that she is willing to return her shares.
56	"Chapter 56"	24 August 2018	1.20
Emilia suffers a crisis and does not know what to do with her life. Simon falls into the game of Abelardo and is accused of blackmail. Bela discovers that Ignacio has leukemia and he tries to convince her with arguments that he is really sorry.
57	"Chapter 57"	27 August 2018	1.35
Bela decides to enter Ignacio's mental game while Abelardo continues to try to corrupt Simon. Emilia ends her relationship with Emanuel. Ignacio hires Ramiro to develop synthetic marijuana.
58	"Chapter 58"	28 August 2018	1.40
Emanuel launches his plan to get Emilia back and kills Patricia. Mike seeks to become head of security for Ignacio's lands and discovers his bizarre way of having fun. Bela meets with Juan Pablo at his mother's funeral.
59	"Chapter 59"	29 August 2018	1.33
Bela tells Juan Pablo that he should give himself the opportunity with someone else. Ramiro gives Daniel the first dose of synthetic marijuana and gets sick. Mike and Simón meet at Ignacio's ranch and question their loyalties.
60	"Chapter 60"	30 August 2018	1.51
Mike's life is in danger when he is discovered by Bonifacio. Bela's team and Ignacio's team face each other in a duel to the death in the hunting area. Abelardo demands the head of Ignacio's murderer and Juan Pablo blames himself.
61	"Chapter 61"	31 August 2018	1.26
Ricardo puts Juan Pablo free and Abelardo gets him fired from the police. Bela decides to deliver the video to the Senate but before shows it to Emanuel. Abelardo tries to make the Senate believe that the video is a montage to harm him.
62	"Chapter 62"	3 September 2018	1.43
Emanuel confirms to the Senate that the video for which Abelardo is indicted is a montage. Abelardo begins to gather people close to his former partners to coordinate an attack against Bela. Emanuel confesses to Emilia that Chucho is his son.
63	"Chapter 63"	4 September 2018	1.26
The coordinated attack of Abelardo begins to take effect and Mike is the first to fall. Graciela exposes her marital problems before the media and Abelardo decides to kill her. Penelope asks Bela to desist from her revenge.
64	"Chapter 64"	5 September 2018	1.38
Marcia fails in her attempt to kill Graciela. Abelardo discovers Emanuel's plan to kill him and it is Emilia who is responsible for finishing the job. Ricardo discovers that the shadow is Emmanuel, but he can not reveal it.
65	"Chapter 65"	6 September 2018	1.50
Bela and Juan Pablo deduce that Emmanuel is the Sombra. Emanuel begins to corner Bela using the press and the Federal Police. Bela tries to know if Chuchito is the son of María and Emanuel.
66	"Chapter 66"	10 September 2018	1.74
Bela and Emanuel face each other face to face, the situation gets out of control and her life is in danger. Juan Pablo arrives in time to save Bela, but he can not stop Emilia from hurting her.
