= Pinches momias =

- Genre: Comedy horror
- Created by: Santiago Limón; Jose Miguel Núñez
- Showrunner: Santiago Limón
- Starring: Xiunel Gonzalez; Daniel Abrego; Rogelio Cruz
- Composer: Amado López
- Country of origin: Mexico
- Original language: Spanish
- No. of seasons: 1
- No. of episodes: 8

Production
- Executive producers: Santiago Limón; Ben Silverman; Howard T. Owens; Rodney Ferrell; Isabel San Vargas; Gina Cifuentes; José Miguel Núñez; Paul Drago; Gabriela Ramirez de Estenoz
- Producer: Jorge Ramírez
- Editor: Martha Poly Amee
- Production companies: Propagate Fuego; Perro Azul

Original release
- Network: Vix
- Release: 1 September 2023

Pinches momias is a Mexican comedy horror streaming television series created by Santiago Limón and Jose Miguel Núñez. The series stars Xiunel Gonzalez, Daniel Abrego, Rogelio Cruz, Saak Figueroa Bórquez and Berenice Jonguitud. It premiered on Vix on 1 September 2023.

== Cast ==
- Xiunel Gonzalez as Simba
- Daniel Abrego as Místico
- Rogelio Cruz as Chinche
- Saak Figueroa Bórquez as Ramsés
- Berenice Jonguitud as Oly
- Diana Bovio as Beatriz Flores-Myer
- Rafael Inclán as Lincoln
- Luis Fernando Peña as Calderón
- Daniel García Sámano as Peña
- Tiaré Scanda as Lorena
- Mercedes Hernández as Doña Tránsito
- Federico Zapata as Bonais
- Edgar Hidrogo as Clavo
- Vitter Leija as Lonchibon
- Natalia Solían as Maruchan
- Leonardo Ávila as Nuevo
- Mónica Aguado as Pilar
- Raúl Solis as Ramón
- Alejandro Guerrero as Father Sandoval
- Miguel Santa Rita as Father Gael
- Leonardo Alonso as Don Chuy
- Carlos Aragón as Arzobispo
- Hernán del Riego as García García
- Laura Wedel as Isabel
- Adrián Vázquez as Curiel
- José Casasús as The Ambassador
- Fernando Memje as Father Raúl
- Mario Monroy as Rogelio

== Production ==
In June 2021, the series was announced as one of the titles for TelevisaUnivision's streaming platform Vix. Production of the series began on 6 June 2022. Propagate Fuego and Perro Azul serve as production companies for the series. On 17 August 2023, it was announced that the series would premiere on 1 September 2023.

== Episodes ==
| No. | Title | Directed by | Written by | Original release date |
|---|---|---|---|---|
| 1 | "Pinches momias" | Santiago Limón | Santiago Limón | 1 September 2023 |
| 2 | "La prueba" | Santiago Limón | Aura García-Junco & Marlin Galindo & José Miguel Núñez | 1 September 2023 |
| 3 | "El pastor" | Edgar Nito | Jose Miguel Núñez & Joseph Hemsani | 1 September 2023 |
| 4 | "Los sacros objetos" | Edgar Nito | Jose Miguel Núñez | 1 September 2023 |
| 5 | "Lobos" | Edgar Nito | Marlin Galindo & Aura García-Junco & José Miguel Núñez | 1 September 2023 |
| 6 | "Loma bonita" | Edgar Nito | Jose Miguel Núñez | 1 September 2023 |
| 7 | "Alhóndiga" | Santiago Limón | Jose Miguel Núñez & Aura García-Junco & Fernanda Bada | 1 September 2023 |
| 8 | "Santa Paula" | Santiago Limón | Santiago Limón | 1 September 2023 |
