= Paraíso blanco =

- Genre: Drama
- Based on: Crazy Charlie by Ron Chepesiuk
- Developed by: Jorg Hiller
- Directed by: Carlos Andres Villamizar; Juan Carlos Vasquez
- Starring: Sebastián Osorio; Michal Malinowski; Camila Bordon; Laura Rodríguez
- Composer: José Ricardo Torres
- Country of origin: Colombia
- Original language: Spanish
- No. of seasons: 2
- No. of episodes: 30

Production
- Executive producers: Amparo Gutiérrez; Dago García; Ángela Armando García; Harold Sánchez; Vicenzo Gratteri; Moisés Dayan
- Editor: Fabián Rodríguez Uscátegui
- Production company: Caracol Televisión

Original release
- Network: Vix
- Release: 20 July 2023 – 18 July 2024

Paraíso blanco is a Colombian streaming television series produced by Caracol Televisión for TelevisaUnivision. The series is based on the life of former German-Colombian drug lord Carlos Lehder, based on the book Crazy Charlie written by Ron Chepesiuk. Sebastián Osorio stars as Lehder. The series premiered on Vix on 20 July 2023. The second and final season premiered on 18 July 2024.

== Cast ==
=== Main ===
- Sebastián Osorio as Carlos Lehder
  - Carlos Serrato as 72-year-old Carlos
  - Kevin Buritica as 15-year-old Carlos
- Michal Malinowski as Lewis
- Camila Bordón as Jymel
- Laura Rodríguez as Nidia

=== Recurring ===
- Variel Sánchez as Carlos Toro "Torito"
  - Daniel Calderón as 15-year-old Torito
- Cesar Álvarez as Hermann Lehder
  - Eduardo Pérez as young Hermann
- Andrés Castañeda as Pablo Escobar
- Cristian Villamil as Popeye
- Bibiana Navas as María Clara Rivas
- Lorena García as Vera Lehder
  - Isabella Miranda as 17-year-old Vera
- Alejandro Gutiérrez as Diego Lehder
  - Juan Castellanos as 17-year-old Diego
- Alejandro Pedraza as Nacho
- Valeria Galviz as Julie Lehder
- Linda Lucía Callejas as Virginia Rivas
- Johan Méndez as Manny
- Alejandro Martínez as Willheim Lehder
- Andrés Echavarria
- Lina Tejeiro
- Mijail Mulkay
- Cecilia Navia
- Juan Carlos Ortega

== Episodes ==
Season	Episodes	Originally released
1	15	20 July 2023
2	15	18 July 2024

=== Season 1 (2023) ===
No. overall	No. in season	Title	Original release date
1	1	"El loco"	20 July 2023
2	2	"Jymel"	20 July 2023
3	3	"100 Kilos"	20 July 2023
4	4	"Traicionera"	20 July 2023
5	5	"Quid Pro Quo"	20 July 2023
6	6	"Blanca nieve"	20 July 2023
7	7	"La viuda negra"	20 July 2023
8	8	"La primera vuelta"	20 July 2023
9	9	"Emboscada"	20 July 2023
10	10	"Guerras de Miami"	20 July 2023
11	11	"Destino Cayo Norman"	20 July 2023
12	12	"O.I.A."	20 July 2023
13	13	"Bellavista"	20 July 2023
14	14	"Margarita"	20 July 2023
15	15	"La Ruta Imperialista"	20 July 2023

=== Season 2 (2024) ===
No. overall	No. in season	Title	Original release date
16	1	"Retirada"	18 July 2024
17	2	"Relevo de mando"	18 July 2024
18	3	"Cambio de planes"	18 July 2024
19	4	"Aire Montes Co LTD"	18 July 2024
20	5	"La cosa política"	18 July 2024
21	6	"Volver a EE.UU"	18 July 2024
22	7	"La posada Alemana"	18 July 2024
23	8	"Cara a cara"	18 July 2024
24	9	"Secuestro"	18 July 2024
25	10	"M.A.S"	18 July 2024
26	11	"El gran golpe"	18 July 2024
27	12	"Padre de familia"	18 July 2024
28	13	"Panamá"	18 July 2024
29	14	"Fuego y cenizas"	18 July 2024
30	15	"Alemania"	18 July 2024
