= List of Hombre tenías que ser episodes =

Hombre tenías que ser (You Had to Be a Man) is a Mexican telenovela produced by Azteca in 2013. It is a remake of Colombian telenovela, Hombres. On September 23, 2013, Azteca started broadcasting Hombre Tenías que Ser weeknights at 9:30pm, replacing Vivir a destiempo. The last episode was broadcast on February 14, 2014, with Avenida Brasil replacing it the following week.

== Episodes ==
Air Date	Number	Episode Title	Rating	Duration
September 23, 2013	001	Raquel y Román se conocieron y entre ellos existió una gran química	8.3	59 minutes
September 24, 2013	002	Tony no soporta los celos que siente por Raquel y hace lo posible por fastidiarla	6.8	52 minutes
September 25, 2013	003	Román besó a Raquel frente al Tiburón	6.8	45 minutes
September 26, 2013	004	Ahora Román siente celos por Raquel, por un supuesto novio	6.2	46 minutes
September 27, 2013	005	Roman les cuenta a sus compañeros lo que pasó en el brindis de Raquel	6.5	46 minutes
September 30, 2013	006	Raquel conoce a la amante de su padre en un restaurante	6.1	47 minutes
October 1, 2013	007	Franco descubre los verdaderos sentimientos de Tony hacia Román	6.3	43 minutes
October 2, 2013	008	Pablo y Franco pasaron la noche juntos y Tony los descubre	5.7	39 minutes
October 3, 2013	009	Román tomará la decisión de no verse más con Raquel fuera de la oficina	5.5	41 minutes
October 4, 2013	010	¿Román intentará olvidar a Raquel en los brazos de Tony?	5.9	43 minutes
October 7, 2013	011	¿El Tiburón dirá la verdad sobre su odio a Román?	6.0	42 minutes
October 8, 2013	012	Román y Raquel prefieren verse a escondidas	6.2	42 minutes
October 9, 2013	013	Román y Raquel ya tienen un nido de amor, lograrán ser felices	6.2	42 minutes
October 10, 2013	014	Raquel no aceptará que la amante de su padre trabaje en la agencia	5.7	42 minutes
October 11, 2013	015	El Tiburón no piensa dejar que su mujer lo chantajeé	4.9	42 minutes
October 14, 2013	016	Raquel quiere llevar a su mamá por ayuda a alcohólicos anónimos	5.7	42 minutes
October 15, 2013	017	Tomás no pierde la oportunidad de burlarse de Román, ahora que él ganó el puesto de Fausto	5.7	39 minutes
October 16, 2013	018	Román aceptó el trato con el Tiburón para salvar a su mamá de la cárcel	5.7	43 minutes
October 17, 2013	019	El Tiburón quiere limpiar su imagen y Román será el encargado	6.3	42 minutes
October 18, 2013	020	Román le asegura a el Tiburón que el Sr. Lara despertará para defenderse de sus calumnias	5.2	42 minutes
October 21, 2013	021	Román quiere saber si Raquel siente lo mismo que él por ella	5.7	43 minutes
October 22, 2013	022	Aura ya no tiene límites y hará todo por separar al Tiburón de su esposa	6.1	42 minutes
October 23, 2013	023	Pablo se casa con Julieta en su lecho de muerte	6.9	42 minutes
October 24, 2013	024	Pablo no sabe cómo le explicará a su hijo la muerte de Julieta	6.0	42 minutes
October 25, 2013	025	Tony se enfrenta a Tomás porque sabe lo que está haciendo con su esposa	5.3	41 minutes
October 28, 2013	026	Tony hará todo lo que el Tiburón Lomelí le pide para separar a Román de Raquel	5.4	42 minutes
October 29, 2013	027	Tomás ahora explota en contra de su hija	5.3	40 minutes
October 30, 2013	028	Fausto nota una actitud negativa y explosiva en Tomás	6.2	42 minutes
October 31, 2013	029	Tony hace todo para que Raquel sienta celos al verla con Román	5.4	42 minutes
November 1, 2013	030	Tony se siente rechazada por Román y le echa en cara que no le crea	4.9	42 minutes
November 4, 2013	031	Raquel no quiere separarse de Román ¿Y ella también correrá peligro?	5.4	39 minutes
November 5, 2013	032	Román le pide a Raquel terminar su relación antes de que la lastimen	5.6	40 minutes
November 6, 2013	033	Aura está dispuesta a seguir las instrucciones del Tiburón para conquistar a Fausto	5.3	39 minutes
November 7, 2013	034	Román sabe que hay algo más detrás del Tiburón y la relación con su mamá	6.0	40 minutes
November 8, 2013	035	Aura sigue haciendo todo por conquistar a Fausto	4.9	40 minutes
November 11, 2013	036	Minerva sufrió un accidente	4.9	40 minutes
November 12, 2013	037	Tomás quiere que Raquel desprecie tanto a Román como él	5.2	40 minutes
November 13, 2013	038	Tomás sigue intrigando a Raquel en contra de Román, hasta lograr separarlos	5.1	40 minutes
November 14, 2013	039	Minerva ha llegado muy lejos por los celos que siente al ver a Franco con otras mujeres	5.3	40 minutes
November 15, 2013	040	Franco no permitirá que Minerva siga haciéndole daño	5.2	38 minutes
November 18, 2013	041	Apoyará Raquel a Román ahora que sabe la verdad del dinero	5.2	40 minutes
November 19, 2013	042	Fausto cae en las garras de Aura y el Tiburón sigue con su plan	5.6	38 minutes
November 20, 2013	043	Román encontró pruebas para deslindarse de todo lo que lo están culpando	5.3	40 minutes
November 21, 2013	044	¿Román sabrá que Jorge Lara es su verdadero padre?	5.8	40 minutes
November 22, 2013	045	Fausto le reclama al Tiburón que Aura sea su amante	4.7	39 minutes
November 25, 2013	046	Tomás amenaza a su esposa con dejarla sin nada si decide dejarlo	4.9	40 minutes
November 26, 2013	047	Romá acepta que él cometió el fraude porque el Tiburón tiene a su mamá	6.1	40 minutes
November 27, 2013	048	Román está en la cárcel y recibe la noticia que su Lara está despierto	5.4	39 minutes
November 28, 2013	049	Minerva le demostrará a Franco lo que ella sintió al ser usada por él	5.2	40 minutes
November 29, 2013	050	Capítulo impactante de viernes, revívelo sólo entrando aquí	5.8	38 minutes
December 2, 2013	051	Raquel no le creerá una sola palabra de lo que Abril le dice	5.3	39 minutes
December 3, 2013	052	Román no quiere que nadie sepa el trato que tiene con el Tiburón	5.6	39 minutes
December 4, 2013	053	Raquel se enfrenta a su padre después de saber toda la verdad	5.6	39 minutes
December 5, 2013	054	El ingeniero Lara sufrió de un infarto	5.3	40 minutes
December 6, 2013	055	El Tiburón le confiesa a Abril que siempre estuvo enamorado de ella	5.5	37 minutes
December 9, 2013	056	Raquel sabe que perdió a su hijo y Román le dice que la odia	6.2	39 minutes
December 10, 2013	057	Román le dice a Raquel que la odia por arrebatarle a su madre	5.8	39 minutes
December 11, 2013	058	Román cae en los brazos de Tony por el desamor y la traición de Raquel	5.3	40 minutes
December 12, 2013	059	El Tiburón quiere vengarse de Román pero fue a prisión por las pruebas que presentó Lara	5.6	41 minutes
December 13, 2013	060	El Tiburón puede salir de la cárcel ahora que tiene quien lo ayude	5.6	39 minutes
December 16, 2013	061	Román y Tony iniciaron una relación	5.9	39 minutes
December 17, 2013	062	Román es dueño de la mitad de la agencia y Raquel siente celos al verlo con Tony	5.7	39 minutes
December 18, 2013	063	Gaby sabe que su padre fue capaz de matar a Anabel a golpes	5.3	39 minutes
December 19, 2013	064	Tony le asegura a Fausto que lo que ella dice es la verdad	5.2	37 minutes
December 20, 2013	065	Román no es el mismo de antes y su padre lo sabe	5.4	38 minutes
December 23, 2013	066	Román piensa que no le interesa a Raquel porque no siguió su juego	4.4	38 minutes
December 24, 2013	067	Tony no acepta que Román ame a Raquel y se olvide de su mamá	3.4	38 minutes
December 25, 2013	068	Tony se mudará a la casa de Román, pero él le aclara que no piensa casarse con ella	4.4	41 minutes
December 26, 2013	069	Tony le pidió al Tiburón que la regrese a la agencia	5.0	42 minutes
December 27, 2013	070	El Tiburón está fuera de la cárcel y cobrará todo lo que le hizo Román	5.8	39 minutes
December 30, 2013	071	Raquel tiene otro enfrentamiento con Tony	N/A	41 minutes
December 31, 2013	072	Gaby se entera que su mamá está muerta	3.3	41 minutes
January 1, 2014	073	Franco se da cuenta que está solo como Polito	3.8	40 minutes
January 2, 2014	074	Raquel le dice a Román que estuvo esperando a un hijo de él	5.1	40 minutes
January 3, 2014	075	Román se entera que Raquel sale con Tomás	5.2	39 minutes
January 6, 2014	076	Gaby tendrá que pagar lo que le hizo a Molina	5.1	39 minutes
January 7, 2014	077	Molina le hace pagar a Gaby lo que le hizo	5.4	40 minutes
January 8, 2014	078	Gloria le dice a Tomás que él es el culpable de la muerte de Anabel	6.3	40 minutes
January 9, 2014	079	Román le recrimina a su padre el estar saliendo con Caridad	5.5	41 minutes
January 10, 2014	080	Román ve a Raquel y Tomás besarse	5.4	39 minutes
January 13, 2014	081	Raquel besa a Tomás y comienza a ver que él, es el hombre que le conviene	6.0	N/A
January 14, 2014	082	Román le pide perdón a Raquel por llamarle tomado y haberle hecho	6.1	39 minutes
January 15, 2014	083	Román intenta conquistar de nuevo a Raquel y Tony no lo permitirá	6.2	40 minutes
January 16, 2014	084	Tony confiesa no estar embarazada de Román a Aura	5.4	39 minutes
January 17, 2014	085	Tony no acepta que Román la deje para regresar con Raquel	5.8	39 minutes
January 20, 2014	086	Tony amenaza con abortar a su hijo, ahora que la dejó	5.4	39 minutes
January 21, 2014	087	Aura le dice a Román que Tony perderá a su hijo, pero a él no le importa	5.9	40 minutes
January 22, 2014	088	Polito está casado por fin y vive su amor al máximo	5.6	41 minutes
January 23, 2014	089	El Tiburón se presenta en el velorio de Caridad y Lara... Román le disparará	6.1	40 minutes
January 24, 2014	090	Tomás quiere quitar al Tiburón de su camino	6.0	42 minutes
January 27, 2014	091	Raquel hará lo que el Tiburón le pida para que deje en paz a Román	5.7	41 minutes
January 28, 2014	092	El Tiburón le promete a Tony ponerle a Román en charola de plata	5.4	41 minutes
January 29, 2014	093	Molina recibirá su merecido y Gaby, Tomás y Teo saldrán bien librados	5.1	41 minutes
January 30, 2014	094	Tony le dice a Raquel que ella y Román van a regresar	5.8	39 minutes
January 31, 2014	095	¿El Tiburón regresa a vivir con Raquel?	5.6	41 minutes
February 3, 2014	096	Tony se le lanzará a Franco, pero eso no puede ser para él	5.8	40 minutes
February 4, 2014	097	Raquel no puede dejar de pensar en Román	6.2	39 minutes
February 5, 2014	098	Tony le dice a Raquel en donde está Román	6.7	39 minutes
February 6, 2014	099	Raquel tiene las pruebas para demostrar que el Tiburón fue culpable de la muerte de Abril	6.0	40 minutes
February 7, 2014	100	Tomás noquea a Raquel y Aura va a la cárcel para burlarse del Tiburón	5.6	39 minutes
February 10, 2014	101	Raquel sabe que Tomás fue capaz de matar a su esposa Anabel	6.1	39 minutes
February 11, 2014	102	N/A	6.6	39 minutes
February 12, 2014	103	No te pierdas el gran final	6.6	39 minutes
February 13, 2014	104	Raquel se suelta de las ataduras de Tomás y él la golpea cruelmente	6.4	39 minutes
February 14, 2014	105	¡Disfrútalo entrando aquí!	6.8	39 minutes
