= Las pelotaris 1926 =

- Genre: Drama
- Created by: Marc Cistaré
- Written by: Adriana Rivas; Javier Naya; Anaí López; Marc Cistaré
- Directed by: Jesús Rodrigo
- Starring: Zuria Vega; Claudia Salas; María de Nati; David Chocarro; Alex Onieva; Marco de la O
- Theme music composer: Osvaldo Montes
- Country of origin: Mexico
- Original language: Spanish
- No. of seasons: 1
- No. of episodes: 8

Production
- Executive producers: Gabriela Remirez; Vicenzo Gratteri; Laura Fernández Espeso; Javier Pons; Marc Cistaré
- Production company: The Mediapro Studio

Original release
- Network: Vix+
- Release: 10 March – 21 April 2023

Las pelotaris 1926 is a Mexican streaming television series created by Marc Cistaré, and produced by The Mediapro Studio. The series follows Chelo (Zuria Vega), Idoia (Claudia Salas) and Itzi (María de Nati), three basque pelota players who struggle to fulfill their dreams during the 1920s. David Chocarro, Alex Onieva and Marco de la O also star. It premiered on Vix+ on 10 March 2023.

== Cast ==
=== Main ===
- Zuria Vega as Chelo
- Claudia Salas as Idoia
- María de Nati as Itzi
- David Chocarro as Alejandro
- Alex Onieva as Ane
- Marco de la O as Renato

=== Recurring and guest stars ===
- Viviana Serna as Rosa
- Vicente Tamayo as Mario
- Héctor Kotsifakis as Uribe
- Antonio Gaona as Fernando Gallardo
- Krista Aroca as Koro
- Eva Rubio as Paqui
- Jesús Castejón as Augustin Galarrán
- Peter Vives as Alan Rider
- Eligio Meléndez as Pascual

== Production ==
On 16 February 2022, the series was announced as one of the titles for TelevisaUnivision's streaming platform Vix+. Filming began in Mexico City in August 2022, with Zuria Vega, Claudia Salas, María de Nati and Viviana Serna being the first cast members announced. Filming also took place in Madrid and Guadalajara, Spain. On 9 September 2022, a complete cast list was announced. On 10 January 2023, Vix released the first teaser for the series. On 1 March 2023, it was announced that the series would premiere on 10 March 2023.

== Episodes ==
| No. | Title | Original release date |
|---|---|---|
| 1 | "Pioneras" | 10 March 2023 |
| 2 | "Punto de partido" | 10 March 2023 |
| 3 | "Un disparo en la frente" | 17 March 2023 |
| 4 | "Lo que hay que tener" | 24 March 2023 |
| 5 | "Putas" | 31 March 2023 |
| 6 | "La estilográfica" | 7 April 2023 |
| 7 | "El cielo de los ateos" | 14 April 2023 |
| 8 | "La quimera" | 21 April 2023 |

== Reception ==
=== Awards and nominations ===
| Year | Award | Category | Nominated | Result | Ref |
|---|---|---|---|---|---|
| 2023 | Produ Awards | Best Historical, Political, or Social Series | Las pelotaris 1926 | Nominated | |
| 2023 | Produ Awards | Best Lead Actress - Historical, Political, Social Series or Miniseries | Zuria Vega | Won | |
| 2024 | GLAAD Media Awards | Outstanding Spanish-Language Scripted Television Series | Las pelotaris 1926 | Nominated | |
| 2024 | India Catalina Awards | Best Ibero-American Fiction Series | Las pelotaris 1926 | Nominated | |
| 2024 | Premios Aura | Best Pilot | Las pelotaris 1926 | Won | |
