= La otra cara del alma =

Mexican telenovela (2012–2013)

- Genre: Telenovela
- Created by: Laura Sosa
- Based on: El ángel caído by Luis Reyes de la Maza
- Written by: Araceli Monsell
- Screenplay by: Magda Crisantes
- Directed by: Carlos Guerra; Miguel Ángel Lozana; Sheylla Gonçalves
- Creative director: Marisa Pecanins
- Starring: Gaby Spanic; Eduardo Capetillo; Michelle Vieth; Jorge Alberti; Sergio Kleiner; Saby Kamalich
- Theme music composer: Samuel Castelli
- Opening theme: "Doble cara" by Yahir and Alexis Montoya
- Ending theme: "El alma de Taxco" by Gaby Spanic
- Country of origin: Mexico
- Original language: Spanish
- No. of episodes: 130

Production
- Executive producer: Rita Fusaro
- Cinematography: Manuel Palacios
- Editors: Édgar Bautista; Rigel Sosa Andrade
- Camera setup: Multi-camera
- Production company: Televisión Azteca

Original release
- Network: Azteca Trece
- Release: 12 November 2012 – 10 May 2013

Related
- Amor cautivo; Secretos de familia

La otra cara del alma is a Mexican telenovela that premiered on Azteca Trece on 12 November 2012, and concluded on 10 May 2013. The telenovela is created by Laura Sosa, based on the 1985 Mexican telenovela written by Luis Reyes de la Maza, entitled El ángel caído. It stars Gaby Spanic as the titular character, and it premiered with a total of 6.9 million viewers.

== Cast ==
=== Main ===
- Gaby Spanic as Alma Hernández
- Eduardo Capetillo as Roberto Monteaguado
- Michelle Vieth as Daniela de la Vega
- Jorge Alberti as Armando de Alba
- Sergio Kleiner as Padre Ernesto
- Saby Kamalich as Josefina Quijano

=== Recurring ===
- Cecilia Piñeiro as Sofía Durán
- Lambda García as Marcos Figueroa
- Melissa Barrera as Mariana Durán
- Adrián Rubio as Juán Robles
- Verónica Langer as Felícitas Durán
- Carmen Beato as Elvira de Alba
- Ramiro Huerta as Margarito Maldonado / El Gallo
- Sergio Bonilla as Abel Cifuentes
- Javier Escobar as Fernando Suarez / El Jejen
- Fernando Sarfatti as Joaquín de Alba
- Esmeralda Ugalde as Remedios Durán
- Giovanni Florido as Valiente
- Gala Montes as Young Alma Hernández
- Luis Cárdenas as Carlos de la Vega
- Marconi de Morais as Father Ernesto
- Ana Karina Guevara as Ernestina de Suárez
- Elvira Trejo as Estela
