= Adrián Rubio =

Adrián Rubio is Mexican actor and model. He studied acting in Centro de Formacion Actoral of TV Azteca.

== Filmography ==
Actor
Year 2013	Title Destino	Role Enrique	Notes
2016	El Chema	Freddy Torres	
2012	La Otra Cara del Alma	Juan	
2012	Los Rey	Paola's masseur	Special appearance, Episode 41–43
2011–2012	A Corazón Abierto	Jorge Valenzuela	
2010	La Loba	Daniel	
2007	Cambio de vida		Episode: "Por la mala"
2006	Campeones de la vida	Danilo Duarte	
2006	Amor sin condiciones	Alexander	
2005	Amor en Custodia	Germán	
2005	Top Models		
