= Tía Alison =

- Genre: Telenovela
- Created by: Héctor Moncada
- Written by: Héctor Moncada; Laura Bolaño; Gerardo Pinzón
- Directed by: Israel Sánchez; Víctor Cantillo
- Starring: Juliette Pardau; Rodrigo Candamil
- Composer: Oliver Camargo
- Country of origin: Colombia
- Original language: Spanish
- No. of seasons: 1
- No. of episodes: 63

Production
- Executive producer: Andrés Santamaría
- Editor: Catalina García
- Production company: RCN Televisión

Original release
- Network: Canal RCN
- Release: 26 July – 31 October 2023

Tía Alison (English: Aunt Alison) is a Colombian telenovela created by Héctor Moncada. It aired on Canal RCN from 26 July 2023 to 31 October 2023. Juliette Pardau stars as the titular character, alongside Rodrigo Candamil.

== Plot ==
Alison Párraga (Juliette Pardau) is a tattoo artist who is going to live in Los Angeles to become the best tattoo artist in the world. Alison does not believe in love nor imagine having children because her sister Olga (Paola Moreno) has to work all the time to raise her three children as a single mother. However, Alison is forced to return to Colombia after the death of her sister and become the mother of her three nephews. Gustavo Orjuela (Rodrigo Candamil), a social worker, will have the responsibility of deciding if Alison is fit to take care of her nephews. Also involved in this decision will be Lorena Maldonado (Manuela González), Gustavo's boss and girlfriend, who will be a big problem for Alison.

== Cast ==
=== Main ===
- Juliette Pardau as Alison Párraga
- Rodrigo Candamil as Gustavo Orjuela
- Manuela González as Lorena Maldonado
- Brian Moreno as Ramón Ovalle "El Flaco"
- Margalida Castro as Carmenza
- Humberto Dorado as Eladio
- Andrea Esquivel as Ágatha Tatiana López
- Tuto Ñatiño as James Linares
- María José Vargas as Dakota
- Sebastián Moya as Washington
- Camila Durán as Cecilia Montaño
- Laura Junco as Lucrecia Lamprea "La Cuqui"
- Michell Orozco as Kimberly
- Luciana Garnica as Luisiana

=== Recurring and guest stars ===
- Carlos Hurtado as Amilcar Rodríguez
- Paola Moreno as Olga Párraga
- Julián Zuluaga as Bayron

== Production ==
In December 2022, the series was announced as part of Canal RCN's programming for 2023. Filming of the series began on 23 March 2023.

== Release ==
Tía Alison is premiered on Canal RCN on 26 July 2023. Internationally, the show will begin streaming on Vix, making episodes available on the platform a day after their original Colombian broadcast.

== Ratings ==
| Season | Timeslot (COT) | Episodes | First aired | | Last aired | | Avg. viewers (in points) |
| Season | Timeslot (COT) | Episodes | Date | Viewers (in points) | Date | Viewers (in points) | Avg. viewers (in points) |
|---|---|---|---|---|---|---|---|
| 1 | Mon–Fri 9:30 p.m. | 60 | 26 July 2023 | 6.4 | 31 October 2023 | 4.8 | 5.0 |

== Episodes ==
| No. | Title | Original release date | Colombia viewers (Rating points) |
|---|---|---|---|
| 1 | "La vida de Alison cambia sorpresivamente" | 26 July 2023 | 6.4 |
| 2 | "Escapando de la realidad" | 27 July 2023 | 5.1 |
| 3 | "Sintiendo mariposas en el estómago" | 28 July 2023 | 4.8 |
| 4 | "La suerte no está del lado de Alison y sus sobrinos" | 31 July 2023 | 5.3 |
| 5 | "Lorena le pone el camino difícil a Alison" | 1 August 2023 | 6.4 |
| 6 | "La vida le sonríe a Alison" | 2 August 2023 | 5.2 |
| 7 | "Alison se toma a pecho su rol de tía" | 3 August 2023 | 5.5 |
| 8 | "El buen corazón de Gustavo atrae problemas" | 4 August 2023 | 5.3 |
| 9 | "Los corazones empiezan a romperse" | 8 August 2023 | 5.2 |
| 10 | "La personalidad de Alison envuelve a Gustavo" | 9 August 2023 | 5.8 |
| 11 | "El amor surge en lugares inesperados" | 10 August 2023 | 4.9 |
| 12 | "Un padre ausente es difícil de perdonar" | 11 August 2023 | 5.2 |
| 13 | "Manteniendo a la familia unida" | 14 August 2023 | 5.5 |
| 14 | "Un clavo saca otro clavo" | 15 August 2023 | 5.4 |
| 15 | "Amílcar es la piedra en el camino de Alison" | 16 August 2023 | 5.1 |
| 16 | "El sueño de emprender vuelve a nacer" | 17 August 2023 | 5.3 |
| 17 | "Ayudas caídas del cielo" | 18 August 2023 | 4.5 |
| 18 | "El amor está patas arriba" | 22 August 2023 | 5.0 |
| 19 | "Lorena ejerce su poder en contra de Alison" | 23 August 2023 | 5.2 |
| 20 | "Con las manos atadas" | 24 August 2023 | 4.3 |
| 21 | "En medio de la oscuridad, el amor brilla" | 25 August 2023 | 4.8 |
| 22 | "Perdiendo las esperanzas" | 28 August 2023 | 5.2 |
| 23 | "Alison no le teme a Lorena" | 29 August 2023 | 5.5 |
| 24 | "En juego largo, hay desquite" | 30 August 2023 | 5.2 |
| 25 | "La honestidad es la base de todo" | 31 August 2023 | 5.5 |
| 26 | "Decisiones complicadas" | 1 September 2023 | 5.1 |
| 27 | "Entre el amor y la familia" | 4 September 2023 | 5.1 |
| 28 | "La vida se complica para Gustavo" | 5 September 2023 | 5.0 |
| 29 | "Lorena no se queda con los brazos cruzados" | 6 September 2023 | 5.1 |
| 30 | "El amor no es lo que parece" | 7 September 2023 | N/A |
| 31 | "Alison enfrenta una nueva decepción" | 11 September 2023 | N/A |
| 32 | "Amar hasta el último momento" | 13 September 2023 | 4.9 |
| 33 | "El eterno desacuerdo de Alison y Amílcar" | 14 September 2023 | N/A |
| 34 | "Huyendo de la realidad" | 15 September 2023 | 4.3 |
| 35 | "Más dolores de cabeza para Alison" | 18 September 2023 | 4.2 |
| 36 | "Gustavo y sus confusos sentimientos" | 19 September 2023 | 4.4 |
| 37 | "Alison busca ayuda para Luisiana" | 20 September 2023 | 4.6 |
| 38 | "Decepción tras decepción" | 21 September 2023 | 4.5 |
| 39 | "Lorena le da un ultimátum a Gustavo" | 22 September 2023 | 4.3 |
| 40 | "James le pone más obstáculos a Gustavo" | 25 September 2023 | 4.7 |
| 41 | "Los problemas no faltan para Alison" | 26 September 2023 | 4.5 |
| 42 | "Luchando contra viento y marea" | 27 September 2023 | 4.6 |
| 43 | "Las artimañas de Amílcar" | 28 September 2023 | 4.8 |
| 44 | "El dinero de Olga se está esfumando" | 29 September 2023 | 5.0 |
| 45 | "Dakota le rompe el corazón de Alison" | 2 October 2023 | 4.5 |
| 46 | "El mundo se derrumba para Alison" | 3 October 2023 | 4.5 |
| 47 | "Las despedidas son difíciles" | 4 October 2023 | 5.6 |
| 48 | "Lorena defiende a capa y espada su matrimonio" | 5 October 2023 | 5.4 |
| 49 | "Alison siente la ausencia de sus sobrinos" | 6 October 2023 | 5.0 |
| 50 | "Gustavo se arriesga para buscar la verdad" | 9 October 2023 | 4.4 |
| 51 | "Siguiendo los movimientos de James" | 10 October 2023 | 4.5 |
| 52 | "Lorena no quiere a Alison en su vida" | 11 October 2023 | 4.4 |
| 53 | "Gustavo respeta sus principios" | 13 October 2023 | 4.1 |
| 54 | "Alison tiene la decisión en sus manos" | 18 October 2023 | 4.9 |
| 55 | "El buen hijo vuelve a casa" | 19 October 2023 | 4.8 |
| 56 | "Gustavo asume las consecuencias de su decisión" | 20 October 2023 | 5.0 |
| 57 | "La vida de Washington cambia en un segundo" | 23 October 2023 | 5.2 |
| 58 | "Alison y sus sobrinos deben enfrentar la realidad" | 24 October 2023 | 4.8 |
| 59 | "En el corazón no se manda" | 25 October 2023 | 5.1 |
| 60 | "Byron se atreve a confesar la verdad" | 26 October 2023 | 5.9 |
| 61 | "Retomando el sueño original" | 27 October 2023 | 4.5 |
| 62 | "Los sueños no se abandonan" | 30 October 2023 | 5.8 |
| 63 | "A donde el corazón se inclina, el pie camina" | 31 October 2023 | 4.8 |
