= Hombre tenías que ser =

Mexican telenovela

- Genre: Romance drama
- Created by: Mónica Agudelo Tenorio ^{till episode 54} Eric Vonn ^{from episode 55}
- Written by: Gabriel Santos ^{till episode 54} Víctor Civeira ^{till episode 54} Eric Vonn ^{from episode 55}
- Directed by: Walter Doehner; Víctor Herrera
- Starring: Ivonne Montero; Víctor González; Jorge Alberti; Fernando Alonso; Francisco de la O Matías Novoa; Sylvia Sáenz; Claudio Lafarca
- Opening theme: "Solo Tú" by Carlos Rivera
- Country of origin: Mexico
- Original language: Spanish
- No. of episodes: 105 (list of episodes)

Production
- Executive producers: Luis Urquiza; Elisa Salinas; Pedro Lira
- Producer: Gerardo Zurita
- Production locations: Mexico City, Mexico
- Camera setup: Multi-camera
- Running time: 40-45 minutes
- Production company: Azteca

Original release
- Network: Azteca 13; Azteca America
- Release: September 23, 2013 – February 14, 2014

Related
- Vivir a destiempo; Avenida Brasil

Hombre tenías que ser (You Had to Be a Man) is a Mexican telenovela produced by Azteca in 2013. It is a remake of Colombian telenovela, Hombres. On September 23, 2013, Azteca started broadcasting Hombre Tenías que Ser weeknights at 9:30pm, replacing Vivir a destiempo. The last episode was broadcast on February 14, 2014, with Avenida Brasil replacing it the following week.

== Cast ==
Actor	Character	Description
Ivonne Montero	Raquel Lomelí	
Víctor González	Román Ortega	
Sylvia Sáenz	Antonieta "Tony" Luján	
Fernando Alonso	Tomás Alvarez	
Matías Novoa	Pablo Cantú	
Francisco de la O	Fausto Aguirre	
Claudio Lafarga	Polito Beltrán	
Jorge Alberti	Franco Santoyo	
Javier Díaz Dueñas	Emiliano Lomelí	
Dolores Heredia	Caridad Montemayor	
Karina Gidi	Gloria Donato	
José Carlos Rodríguez	Jorge Lara	
Cecilia Piñeiro	Minerva Campos †	
Tania Arredondo	Anabel Trueba †	
Verónica Langer	Abril Martí †	
Rodrigo Cachero	Oscar Mayo	
Thali García	Gaby Álvarez	
Christian Vázquez	Molina	
Agustín Hernánde	Teo Aguirre	
Kenya Gazcón	Diana	
Carla Carrillo	Julieta Almada †	
Alberto Trujillo	Urraca	
Marco Zapata	Mocho	
Maripaz Mata	Martita	
Amaya Blas	Magaly	
Paulo Arce Calderón	Sebastian Cantú †	

== Production ==
- Due to low ratings screenplay writers were dismissed from episode 54 and Eric Vonn entered as a writer from episode 55, he completely changes story on his own as an original.
