= Jorge Alberti =

Puerto Rican film and television actor

- Born: Jorge Alberto Martinez; March 31, 1977 (age 49); Mayagüez, Puerto Rico
- Occupation: Actor
- Years active: 2004-present
- Spouse: Kathia Parrilla (m. 2008)
- Children: 2

Jorge Alberto Martinez (born March 31, 1977), known as Jorge Alberti, is a Puerto Rican actor who has starred in many telenovelas, most recently in Hombre Tenías que Ser.

== Acting career ==
Jorge Alberti portrayed the role of Roberto on the former NBC daytime drama Passions for three years and had a small role in Steven Soderbergh's Che starring Benicio del Toro. From 2007 to 2008 he starred in Lola, the number one prime time television series in Chile on Canal 13.

In 2007, Jorge Alberti signed on with Hollywood Talent Manager Ruben Malaret of Malaret Entertainment for exclusive representation worldwide and obtained a protagonist role in the Mexican telenovela, Vuélveme A Querer, in 2009.

In February 2008 Alberti was honored at the world-famous "Viña Del Mar Festival" he was crowned as the "Rey" (King) of the festival by the International Press whom attends the Festival every year.

In 2011, he returned to Mexico to participate in Emperatriz. A year after Emperatriz ended, he portrayed a villain in La Otra Cara del Alma.

From late 2013 to early 2014 he portrayed Franco Santoyo on the Azteca produced telenovela Hombre Tenías que Ser.

In 2022, he announced that he had created an Onlyfans account where his followers on that social network could enjoy his erotic content. The actor later published explicit images where he appeared naked showing his erect penis and his buttocks.

== Personal life ==
Alberti married Karla Parrilla in December 2008. In 2010, Parrilla gave birth to the couple's first child, a daughter named Isabella.

== Filmography ==
Year	Show	Role	Notes
Film
2006	Spare Parts		Short film
2008	Che: Part One	Soldier Hector	Uncredited
2008	Oh Baby!	Pablo	
2010	Elite	Raúl Hernández	Frank Perozo film
2011	Not Even the Devil	Miguel Torres	
Television
2004	Ángel Rebelde	Pablo	1 Episode
2004-2005	¡Anita, no Te Rajes!	Federico 'El Fresa'	
2005-2006	Passions	Roberto	Recurring role
2006	Dueña y señora	William 'Willy' Santa Rosa 'El Pato'	TV mini-series
2007-2008	Lola	Pepe Galindo / Lalo Padilla	Dual role
2008	Don Amor	Lucián Carvajal	
2009	Vuélveme A Querer	Ricardo Robles	
2011	Emperatriz	Nicolas "Nico" Galvan Castillo	Main cast
2011	Teatro en CHV	Benjamín	
2012	La Otra Cara del Alma	Armando de Alba	Antagonist
2013–2014	Hombre Tenías que Ser	Franco Santoyo	
2018	La bella y las bestias	Mike	
2018	Las Buchonas	Leónidas	

== See also ==
- List of Puerto Ricans
