= Enfermo amor =

- Promotional release poster
- Directed by: Marco Polo Constandse Cordova; Rodrigo Nava
- Written by: Ovidio de León
- Based on: Love/Sick by John Cariani
- Produced by: John Cariani; José Nacif; Ramiro Ruiz; Miguel Matus; Marco Polo Constandse Cordova
- Starring: Estefanía Hinojosa; Gonzalo Vega; Jesús Zavala; Paco Rueda; Natalia Téllez; Luis Arrieta; Daniel Tovar; Cassandra Sánchez Navarro; Camila Sodi; Alejandro de la Madrid; Eréndira Ibarra; Alberto Guerra; Mónica Huarte; Andrés Palacios; Fernanda Castillo; Adriana Louvier; Maya Zapata; Juan Pablo Medina
- Edited by: Jorge Macaya del Castillo
- Music by: Rodrigo Davila
- Production companies: Retro Casa Productora; Filmadora MX
- Distributed by: Vix+; Videocine
- Release date: 27 July 2022
- Country: Mexico
- Language: Spanish

Enfermo amor is a 2022 Mexican romantic comedy film directed by Marco Polo Constandse and Rodrigo Nava. The film features an ensemble cast consisting of Estefanía Hinojosa, Gonzalo Vega, Paco Rueda, Jesús Zavala, Natalia Téllez, Luis Arrieta, Daniel Tovar, Cassandra Sánchez Navarro, Alejandro de la Madrid, Camila Sodi, Eréndira Ibarra, Alberto Guerra, Mónica Huarte, Andrés Palacios, Fernanda Castillo, Adriana Louvier, Maya Zapata, Juan Pablo Medina. The movie is based on John Cariani's play Love/Sick, and was released by Vix+ on 27 July 2022.

== Cast ==
- Estefanía Hinojosa as Ana
- Gonzalo Vega as Fernando
- Paco Rueda as Santiago
- Jesús Zavala as Andrés
- Natalia Téllez as Luisa
- Luis Arrieta as Botarga
- Daniel Tovar as Sergio
- Cassandra Sánchez Navarro as Celia
- Alejandro de la Madrid as Memo
- Camila Sodi as Sara
- Eréndira Ibarra as Karla
- Alberto Guerra as Marco
- Mónica Huarte as Julia
- Andrés Palacios as Quique
- Fernanda Castillo as Liz
- Adriana Louvier as Sofía
- Maya Zapata as Emilia
- Juan Pablo Medina as Jaime
- Rebecca Jones as Celia's mother
- Enrique Singer as Celia's father
- Ricardo O'Farrill as Ricky

== Production ==
Principal photography began in May 2021 and wrapped in September 2021.

== Release ==
The film was released on 27 July 2022 by Vix+.
