= Marea alta =

Mexican TV series

- Genre: Thriller
- Created by: Katia Priwieziencew; Korek Bojanowski; Antón Goenechea
- Directed by: Roger Gual; Gabriel Mariño; Michelle Garza Cervera
- Starring: Cassandra Ciangherotti; Raúl Méndez; Antonio López Torres; Giovanna Utrilla; Matías Gruener Zabaleta; Alejandro Porter; Alejandro Flores; Jesica Vit
- Composers: Camilo Froideval; Dan Zlotnik
- Country of origin: Mexico
- Original language: Spanish
- No. of seasons: 1
- No. of episodes: 10

Production
- Executive producers: Antón Goenechea; Pablo Cruz; Roger Torras; Diego Suárez Chialvo; Enrique López Lavigne; Giulia Cardamone; Abel Cruz; Natalia Echeverri; Gabriela Remirez de Estenoz
- Editor: Alejandro Lázaro
- Production company: El Estudio

Original release
- Network: Vix+
- Release: 9 September – 11 November 2022

Marea alta is a Mexican thriller streaming television series created by Katia Priwieziencew, Korek Bojanowski, and Antón Goenechea, and produced by El Estudio. It premiered on Vix+ on 9 September 2022. The series follows the disappearance of a teenager and the alterations on everyone's lives after threatening messages from her social media accounts disturbs their quiet community.

== Cast ==
=== Main ===
- Cassandra Ciangherotti as Maya
- Raúl Méndez as Robert
- Antonio López Torres as Samuel
- Giovanna Utrilla as Pau
- Matías Gruener Zabaleta as Greg
- Alejandro Porter as David
- Alejandro Flores as Beto
- Jesica Vite as Mia

=== Recurring ===
- Fermín Martínez as Felipe Wong
- Gustavo Sánchez as Enrique
- Susana Zabaleta as Hortensia
- Eber Segobia as Murguía
- Diana Lein as Gloria
- Gustavo Sánchez Parra as Enrique
- Rod Zapién as Luis
- Irving del Real as Iván
- Leidi Gutiérrez as Cruz
- Paden Koltiska as Jonah
- Mahoali Nassourou as Nina
- Maru Kazán as Sonia
- Adolfo Madera as Diego
- Ángeles Cruz as Eugenia
- Helena Rodríguez as Itzel
- Jessy Flores as Mari
- Alex F. Hugo as Javier
- Gerardo Lechuga as Ricky

== Production ==
On 16 February 2022, the series was announced as one of the titles for TelevisaUnivision's streaming platform Vix+. Filming of the series began on 29 March 2022 in Tijuana and on the beaches of Ensenada, Baja California. On 31 August 2022, Vix released the first official trailer for the series.

== Episodes ==
No.	Title	Directed by	Written by	Original release date
1	"La desaparición"	Roger Gual	Antón Goenechea	9 September 2022
2	"Despedidas"	Roger Gual	Gerardo Lechuga	16 September 2022
3	"Preguntas sin respuestas"	Roger Gual	Antón Goenechea	23 September 2022
4	"Furia incontrolable"	Roger Gual	Natalia Bermúdez Fierro	30 September 2022
5	"Prisionero de las circunstancias"	Gabriel Mariño	Natalia Bermúdez Fierro	7 October 2022
6	"Refugio"	Gabriel Mariño	Gerardo Lechuga	14 October 2022
7	"Conexión inesperada"	Gabriel Mariño	Antón Goenechea	21 October 2022
8	"Consecuencias"	Michelle Garza Cervera & Bruno Montes de Oca Monge	Gerardo Lechuga	28 October 2022
9	"En riesgo"	Michelle Garza Cervera	Natalia Bermúdez Fierro	4 November 2022
10	"Confesión"	Michelle Garza Cervera	Antón Goenechea	11 November 2022
