= Premios Aura =

- Previous: 2025 Premios Aura; Pending: 2026 Premios Aura
- Awarded for: Excellence in television series in spanish language for streaming platforms
- Country: Mexico
- Presented by: FCO Group
- Eligibility: television series in spanish premiered on streaming platforms in Latin America
- First award: 2024
- Website: https://premiosaura.com/

Premios Aura (Aura awards) are awards for excellence in spanish-language television series produced for streaming platforms. The first edition of the annual award ceremony was held in Mexico City in 2024. Premios Aura is owned and organized by FCO Group, a marketing company.

== History ==
Aura Media, an initiative by FCO Group, presented in 2024 the first Aura awards for excellence in spanish-language television series premiered on streaming platforms and available in Latin America online in 2023. The second edition of the ceremony is scheduled for 6 April 2025.

A jury with 100 members, representing the entertainment industry, artists and opinion leaders, evaluated the nominations and analyzed data about impact.

The organization is open for proposals from all streaming platforms. Participating services include Netflix, Prime, Disney+, Vix, Apple TV and Max.

== Categories ==
The 2024 Awards were presented in the following categories:

- Best drama series
- Best comedy series
- Best documentary series
- Best acting performance in drama series
- Best acting performance in comedy series
- Best acting performance in a supporting role
- International hispanic talent
- Best acting debut
- Best cast
- Best script writer
- Best directing
- Best pilot
- Highest impact
- Best Executive Producer
- Lifetime achievement

== Ceremonies ==
Event	Date	Venue
1st	3 July 2024	Fronton México, Mexico City
2nd	6 April 2025	Jardin Santa Fe, Mexico City
