= Consuelo (TV series) =

- Genre: Comedy drama
- Created by: Juan Carlos Aparicio Schlesinger; Mateo Stivelberg
- Written by: Larissa Andrade; Carlos Algara; Florencia Castillo
- Directed by: Kenya Márquez
- Starring: Cassandra Sánchez Navarro; Erick Chapa; Catherine Siachoque; Eileen Yáñez; Lincoln Palomeque
- Composers: Manuel José Gordillo; José Ricaurte
- Country of origin: Mexico
- Original language: Spanish
- No. of seasons: 2
- No. of episodes: 20

Production
- Executive producers: Catalina Porto Urdaneta; Laura Fernández Espeso; Javier Pons; Javier Méndez; Juan Carlos Aparicio; Larissa Andrade
- Producer: Catalina Figueroa
- Editor: Gerson Aguilar
- Production company: The Mediapro Studio

Original release
- Network: Vix
- Release: 19 April 2024 – 22 August 2025

Consuelo is a Mexican comedy drama television series created by Juan Carlos Aparicio Schlesinger and Mateo Stivelberg. Cassandra Sánchez Navarro stars as the titular character, alongside Erick Chapa, Catherine Siachoque, Eileen Yáñez and Lincoln Palomeque. It premiered on Vix on 19 April 2024. The series has been renewed for a second season that premiered on 22 August 2025.

== Premise ==
Set in the 1950s, the series follows a high-society woman who, after being abandoned by her husband, sells sex toys to make ends meet.

== Cast ==
=== Main ===
- Cassandra Sánchez Navarro as Consuelo
- Erick Chapa as Fernando
- Catherine Siachoque as Olga
- Eileen Yáñez as Matilde
- Lincoln Palomeque as Carlos Julio

=== Recurring and guest stars ===
- Sofía Monarrez as Martha Patricia
- Camila Nuñez as Cecilia
- Alexander Ventosa as Andrés
- Verónica Bravo as Ingrid
- Essined Aponte as Leticia
- Paula Barreto as Theresa
- Yuri Vargas as Luci
- Alejandro Gutiérrez as Pedro
- Maura Palma as Eva
- Santiago Miniño as Alonso
- Liseth Barrera as Meche
- Lina María Cabezas as Vivi
- Amalia Santamaría as Lili
- Juan Sebastián Murcia as Héctor
- Ana Jaraba as Amalia
- Juan Diego Rodríguez as Israel
- Ana Celeste Montalvo
- Mario Ruiz

== Production ==
The series was announced on 22 June 2023. The series premiered on 19 April 2024. The second season was announced on 11 February 2025 and premiered on 22 August 2025.

== Episodes ==
Season	Episodes	Originally released
1	10	19 April 2024
2	10	22 August 2025

=== Season 1 (2024) ===
No. overall	No. in season	Title	Original release date
1	1	"Mujer dejada"	19 April 2024
2	2	"Instrucciones"	19 April 2024
3	3	"De secretos y batidores"	19 April 2024
4	4	"Mañanas y mañanitas"	19 April 2024
5	5	"Vibrante venta"	19 April 2024
6	6	"La pezuña del diablo"	19 April 2024
7	7	"Operación La Madame"	19 April 2024
8	8	"Una de nosotros"	19 April 2024
9	9	"Voto de castidad"	19 April 2024
10	10	"Noche de bodas"	19 April 2024

=== Season 2 (2025) ===
No. overall	No. in season	Title	Original release date
11	1	"El desconsuelo"	22 August 2025
12	2	"Decisiones"	22 August 2025
13	3	"La satisfecha"	22 August 2025
14	4	"La otra nueva Lucrecia"	22 August 2025
15	5	"Vida Acelerada"	22 August 2025
16	6	"Discreción"	22 August 2025
17	7	"Hot Hot Hotel"	22 August 2025
18	8	"Oh Baby!"	22 August 2025
19	9	"Duelo de vibraciones"	22 August 2025
20	10	"¡Vibra la revolución!"	22 August 2025

== Awards and nominations ==
Year	Award	Category	Nominated	Result	Ref
2024	Produ Awards	Best Comedy Drama Series	Consuelo	Won	
2024	Produ Awards	Best Lead Actress - Comedy Drama Series and Miniseries	Cassandra Sánchez Navarro	Nominated	
2024	Produ Awards	Best Time Period Recreation	Jeisson Andres Rincón Rodríguez, Ana María Urrea & Laura Copó	Nominated	
2025	Rose d'Or Latinos Awards	Comedy or Dramedy Series	Consuelo	Nominated	
