= Sofia Niño de Rivera =

Mexican stand-up comedian and actress (born 1981)

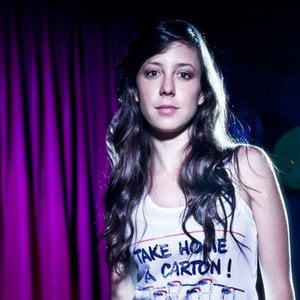
Image of Sofia Niño

Sofia Niño de Rivera (born November 23, 1981) is a Mexican stand-up comedian and actress. She was Mexico City's 2016 woman of the year, as named by Chilango, and has been called a "a leading exponent of stand-up comedy in Mexico and Latin America as a whole."

== Career ==
Niño De Rivera is a cast member on Club de Cuervos, a Spanish-language comedy-drama series on Netflix. She starred in a comedy special on the same platform titled Sofía Niño de Rivera: Expuesta ("Exposed"), released on June 24, 2016. She was the first woman to be given a Spanish-language Netflix comedy special. Her second Netflix stand-up special, Sofía Niño de Rivera: Selección Natural was released on March 30, 2018.

In March 2017, Niño De Rivera appeared on a special episode of the US talk show Conan titled Conan Without Borders: Made in Mexico.

== Personal life ==
Niño De Rivera studied in Colegio Vista Hermosa in Mexico City. Niño De Rivera worked in advertising until she was 28, when she decided to start a new career in stand-up comedy. She was influenced by what she saw as heavy bureaucracy and her dislike of how the advertising industry does business.

== Works ==
=== Comedy specials ===
Year	Title	Distributor
2016	Sofía Niño de Rivera: Expuesta	Netflix
2018	Sofía Niño de Rivera: Selección Natural	Netflix
2018	Sobreviví	YouTube Premium
