= Mónica Sánchez Navarro =

- Born: February 4, 1954 (age 71); Mexico City, Mexico
- Other names: Mónica Sánchez-Navarro
- Years active: 1979–present
- Children: 3
- Parent: Manolo Fábregas (father)
- Relatives: Rafael Sánchez Navarro (brother)

Mónica Sánchez Navarro (born February 4, 1954), is a Mexican television actress.

== Filmography ==
=== Films ===
Year	Title	Role	Notes
1980	El guardespaldas		
1983	Fieras en brama		
1983	Una pura y dos con sal		
2013	V/H/S/2	Hotel Maid	Segment: "Tape 49"
2015	Café con leche	Ángela Manrique-Obregón	

=== Television ===
Year	Title	Role	Notes
1979	Una mujer marcada	Lucero Lascuráin	
1979	El cielo es para todos	Juana Paula	
1984	Principessa	Erika María	
1996	Mujer, casos de la vida real		"El más preciado tesoro" (Season 12, Episode 30)
2012–13	Qué bonito amor	Altagracia Treviño de Martínez de la Garza	
2013	Dama y obrero	Margarita Pérez	
2014–15	Como dice el dicho	Ramona / Doña Esther	"Pagan justos por pecadores" (Season 4, Episode 37); "Para verdades el tiempo" (Season 5, Episode 2)
2015–16	Simplemente María	Georgina Landa de Rivapalacio	
2016	Eva la trailera	Federica Miraval	Supporting Role
2018-2019	Las Buchonas	Sandra	
2021	Si nos dejan	Yaya	
2025	Velvet: El nuevo imperio	Emma	Recurring role
