= La hora marcada (2023 TV series) =

- Genre: Anthology; Horror
- Theme music composer: Álvaro Trespalacios; Luis Guzmán
- Composer: Oskar Gritten
- Country of origin: Mexico
- Original language: Spanish
- No. of seasons: 1
- No. of episodes: 8

Production
- Executive producers: Patricio Wills; Carlos Bardasano
- Producer: Abe Rosenberg
- Editor: Jorge Márquez
- Production companies: W Studios; TelevisaUnivision

Original release
- Network: Vix
- Release: 27 October 2023

La hora marcada is a Mexican horror anthology television series produced by W Studios for TelevisaUnivision, based on the original 1986 television series. The series premiered on Vix on 27 October 2023. Each standalone episode presents a story in which the lives of characters are invaded by disturbing and uncertain circumstances.

== Production ==
On 16 February 2022, the series was announced as one of the titles for TelevisaUnivision's streaming platform Vix+. On 12 October 2022, it was announced that the series had begun filming in Mexico City. A trailer of the series was released on 3 October 2023. The series premiered on 27 October 2023.

== Episodes ==
No.	Title	Directed by	Written by	Original release date
1	"La visita"	Gigi Saul Guerrero	Freddy Chávez Olmos	27 October 2023
Cast: Victoria Viera as Clara, Gabriela Reynoso as Mother Aurelia, Gigi Saul Guerrero as Ximena, Teresa Selma as Mother Valentina, Florencia Ríos as Martha, Diego Cornejo as Abad, Hilda Abrahamz as Woman in Black
2	"Reflejos fugaces"	Andrés Beltrán	Andrés Beltrán	27 October 2023
Cast: Andrés Tirado as Fabián, Michelle Betancourt as Isabel, Pilar Ixquic as Alma, Ana Layevska as Lili, Hilda Abrahamz as Woman in Black
3	"Smog"	Lex Ortega	Josh Candia	27 October 2023
Cast: Cassandra Sánchez Navarro as Bea, Miguel Pizarro as Ian, Hilda Abrahamz as Woman in Black
4	"La mano"	Michelle Garza Cervera	Michelle Garza Cervera & Abia Castillo	27 October 2023
Cast: Mercedes Hernández as Rosario, Martha Claudia Moreno as Andrea, Luis Eduardo Yee as René, Daniel Haddad as Hugo, Aketzaly Verástegui as Dominguez, Hilda Abrahamz as Woman in Black
5	"La bestia"	Andrés Rothschild	Andrés Rothschild	27 October 2023
Cast: Dario Yazbek Bernal as Pipo, Mariané Cartas as Pau, Gabriel Carbajal as Mau, Juan Pablo de Santiago as Miguel, Ofelia Medina as Tomasa, Salvador Sánchez as Gerardo, Hilda Abrahamz as Woman in Black
6	"El temblor"	Laura Casabé	Tomás Downey	27 October 2023
Cast: María Evoli as Inés, Christian Gnecco as Javier, Agustin Zurita as Manuel, Angélica Aragón as Elena, Daniela Momo as Mariana, Hilda Abrahamz as Woman in Black
7	"El primer regalo"	Adrián García Bogliano	Adrián García Bogliano & Ramiro García Bogliano	27 October 2023
Cast: Ruth Ramos as Manu, Harold Torres as Lucas, Jocelín Zuckerman as Pau, Hilda Abrahamz as Woman in Black, Roberto Oropeza as Alfonso
8	"Hermanas"	Roque Falabella	Roque Falabella	27 October 2023
Cast: Nuria Vega as Victoria, Isabella Clemesha as Daniela, Alejandra Ambrosi as Fernanda, Hilda Abrahamz as Woman in Black
9	"La danza del tiempo"	Issac Ezban	Issac Ezban	27 October 2023
Cast: Paola Miguel as Pamela, Mariana Torres as Madame Veronique, Natasha Cubria as Andrea, Constanza Landon as Roberta, Claudia Silki as Karen, Miranda Sharfman as Mirella, Hilda Abrahamz as Woman in Black, Socorro de la Campa as Senior Pamela, Bertha Sandoval as 150-year-old Madame Veronique, María Isabel Benet as Senior Mirella

== Awards and nominations ==
Year	Award	Category	Nominated	Result	Ref
2024	Produ Awards	Best Anthology Series	La hora marcada	Nominated	
