= Las Buchonas =

2018 American Spanish-language telenovela

- Genre: Telenovela
- Created by: Andres López
- Written by: Andres López; Rafael Rojas; Marina Ruiz Tinajero
- Story by: Andres López
- Directed by: Felipe Aguilar D.; Carlos Rincones
- Starring: Joaquín Cosío; Arleth Terán; Roberto Mateos; Thali García; Alejandra Robles Gil; Candela Márquez; Mónica Sánchez Navarro; Sebastián Ferrat; Juan Pablo Gil; Frances Ondiviela; Ireno Alvarez; Pascacio López; Laura Ferretti; Marina Ruiz; Jorge Alberti; Jorge Ortiz de Pinedo; Cassandra Sánchez Navarro; Miguel Rodarte; Bobby Pulido; Vanessa Arias
- Original language: Spanish
- No. of seasons: 1
- No. of episodes: 81

Production
- Executive producer: Patricio Wills
- Producer: Jorge Sastoque Roa
- Editor: Fermín Brancer
- Production companies: W Studios; Univision; Televisa

Original release
- Release: 30 November 2018 – 7 April 2019

Las Buchonas is a Spanish-language telenovela created by Andrés López for Univision and Televisa. The series premiered on Blim on 30 November 2018 and ended on 7 April 2019.

It stars Vanessa Arias, Candela Márquez, Thali García and Alejandra Robles Gil as the titular characters.

== Plot ==
The telenovela revolves around Aurora, Yuliana, Manuela and Tabatha, four women seduced by power and money. Aurora's life changes the day the authorities unjustly kill her father. Once a citizen of Tierra Blanca, she becomes the leader of a group of women who rebel against an unjust patriarchy.

== Cast ==
- Joaquín Cosío as Baltazar
- Arleth Terán as Débora
- Roberto Mateos as Vicente
- Thali García as Manuela
- Alejandra Robles Gil as Tabatha
- Candela Márquez as Yuliana
- Mónica Sánchez Navarro as Chole
- Sebastián Ferrat as Celestino
- Juan Pablo Gil as Luciano
- Frances Ondiviela as Magnolia
- Ireno Alvarez as Mariano
- Pascacio López as Salvador
- Laura Ferretti as Susana Godoy
- Marina Ruiz as Teresa
- Jorge Alberti as Leónidas
- Jorge Ortiz de Pinedo as Rafael León
- Cassandra Sánchez Navarro as Gabriela León
- Miguel Rodarte as Candelario
- Bobby Pulido as El Trueno
- Vanessa Arias as Aurora León

== Episodes ==
No.	Title	Original release date
1	"Ellas son las Buchonas"	30 November 2018
In a town run by drug trafficking and money, Aurora, Yuliana, Manuela and Tabatha, seek a better life. Everyone knows them as the Buchonas.
2	"No te cases"	30 November 2018
Rafael is accused drug trafficking and refuses to receive help from his daughter because he does not approve of her wanting to marry a narco.
3	"Sentenciado"	30 November 2018
Rafael is sentenced. Manuela discovers that she is not with the best man in the world.
4	"El honor de mi padre"	30 November 2018
Ramón kills Rafael in front of his entire family. Aurora swears to clean the honor of her father. Baltazar evicts Yuliana from the estate, who takes refuge in Vicente's house.
5	"Mi maestro"	30 November 2018
Aurora kills her father's murderer and decides to get involved in the drug business. Leónidas is her teacher. Manuela meets Tarsicio, a drug dealer who offers help.
6	"Dónde está Aurora"	30 November 2018
The big narcos of the region begin to look for Aurora, so she has to hide and protect her family.
7	"El camino de la venganza"	30 November 2018
Leónidas is mortally wounded. Vicente manages to return Teresa home, by deceiving her.
8	"La carrera"	30 November 2018
Aurora needs to get the amount of money that Vicente asks, and thus prevent her mother from being murdered. Gabino mistreats Manuela and her mother.
9	"La voy a salvar"	30 November 2018
Aurora does everything possible to save her mother's life and, in the middle of getting the money, she sees El Trueno kissing another woman.
10	"Luciano y Teresa"	30 November 2018
Yuliana seizes Baltazar’s estate. Vicente allows Luciano's relationship with Teresa. Aurora is still looking for how to pay the money to save her mother.
11	"Los narcos no tienen palabra"	9 December 2018
Aurora realizes that the narcos have no word. By saving her mother she loses everything she had, her family stays on the street.
12	"El error de Magnolia"	9 December 2018
The efforts of Tabatha and Magnolia to avoid the union of Manuela Tarcisio are frustrated by Magnolia's mistake. Aurora desperately seeks a place to take her family.
13	"Otro más"	9 December 2018
Mariano offers a house to Aurora so she can take her family to live. There is another dead policeman and more problems for the León family. Yuliana wants to know the details of Baltazar's business.
14	"La traición"	9 December 2018
Aurora's confidence is defrauded again, El Trueno betrays her again. Vicente and Débora made an agreement, but he is unable to fulfill it.
15	"Vicente se va"	16 December 2018
Candelario's life hangs by a thread after a confrontation with the police. Vicente, before the supplications of his daughter, decides to leave the house. Yuliana lives a good life in Los Angeles.
16	"Falsas alianzas"	16 December 2018
False alliances are formed. Aurora believes that with money she will be able to keep Commander Gregorio calm, without knowing that she will fall into a trap. Vicente wants to damage Luciano's reputation in front of Teresa.
17	"Graves consecuencias"	16 December 2018
Aurora puts her family in danger again, but this time with a little more serious consequences, her mother Chole is wounded. El Trueno wants to prove that he is not the father of the baby that Jasmine is expecting.
18	"La punta de iceberg"	16 December 2018
Vicente helps Luciano. Aurora learns that Salvador was behind the death of his father and ends the life of Commander Gregorio.
19	"A flor de piel"	23 December 2018
Aurora returns with El Trueno, Baltazar is with Débora, Luciano with Teresa and Gallo with Manuela, but these relationships are just a temporary stability.
20	"Cuídate Salvador"	23 December 2018
Aurora studies the identity of Salvador, who is one of those involved in the death of her father. She will look for him to start her revenge, even if Chole is opposed.
21	"Chispas de amor"	23 December 2018
Aurora faces Salvador, but he denies being involved in Rafael's death. She captures several of his men. Between Gabriela and Celestino sprout sparks of love.
22	"La trampa"	23 December 2018
Aurora now knows that Vicente was the one who set the trap for Rafael, but before she does something, Vicente sends the police to look for her.
23	"Aurora en la cárcel"	30 December 2018
Aurora is in jail for the first time, but El Trueno and the other men are looking for ways to get her out. Gabriela meets Vicente.
24	"Caer en sus redes"	30 December 2018
Aurora is mistreated and struggles to get out of jail, while her sister Gabriela falls dangerously into Vicente's webs. Baltazar wants Débora and Yuliana to coexist. El Gallo rapes Manuela.
25	"Plan de rescate"	30 December 2018
While the plan to free Aurora flows according to plan, Gabriela falls into the hands of Vicente. Débora hires an accountant to make an appraisal of Vicente's properties and know how much she could receive.
26	"La casa del Gallo"	30 December 2018
Amid all the problems that Aurora has, Gabriela is getting closer to Vicente. Manuela returns to El Gallo's house and sees him packing drugs, she is interested in the business.
27	"Fuera de peligro"	6 January 2019
Vicente is hurt by Aurora and, although in the hospital they save his life, he is not completely out of danger. Débora looks for him to finish him off. Aurora and Gabriela confront each other for Vicente.
28	"El camino fácil"	6 January 2019
Aurora and her family need to be united to face Vicente. Manuela takes the easiest way to earn money, without knowing what will happen to her life.
29	"El contraataque"	6 January 2019
Aurora loses two of her best men and her defense is vulnerable. Vicente plans the counterattack towards Débora. Manuela manages to pass the drug that she was taking to Los Angeles, without major setbacks.
30	"Candelario y Celestino"	6 January 2019
At the cemetery, Aurora decides to leave Candelario and Celestino free. Aurora feels that she must protect her family, so she must keep them united, but deceived. Gabriela is increasingly on Vicente's side.
31	"El ultimátum"	13 January 2019
Mariano gives an ultimatum to Vicente, Baltazar and the commander Edwin: they fix their problems or they die. Tabatha tells Manuela that Yuliana is pregnant and that Baltazar does not treat her well.
32	"Hijos"	13 January 2019
Aurora trusts Vicente's words, not knowing that his true goal is to betray her. Baltazar learns that both Debora and Yuliana are pregnant with his children and does not know what to do.
33	"El concierto de Raúl"	13 January 2019
Raúl's concert, where El Trueno was also invited, is interrupted by gun shots. Aurora looks for the person responsible for the attack at the concert and Luciano has information that can help them.
34	"Ataque en el palenque"	13 January 2019
Aurora catches the Gallo, but wants to clarify what happened and know who ordered the attack in the concert. Caridad's life is changing, love seems to be born between her and Pancracio.
35	"El interrogatorio"	20 January 2019
Manuela has decided to give El Gallo to Aurora, under the promise not to kill him. After the interrogation, El Gallo reveals Salvador's location. Aurora and El Trueno's marriage is prepared, before starting the war against Vicente.
36	"La boda"	20 January 2019
Finally, Aurora and El Trueno get married, with problems, because Gabriela does not appear at the wedding and Candelario tries to prevent the wedding.
37	"Buscando a Magnolia"	20 January 2019
Aurora rises up after being hurt by Vicente, while Gabriela realizes who he really is. Manuela goes in search of Magnolia to clarify what happened to her father.
38	"Entre la vida y la muerte"	20 January 2019
After struggling between life and death, Aurora, with the help of blood donated by Candelario, manages to recover. Vicente looks for her with desperation to finish her off.
39	"Un nuevo negocio de Aurora"	27 January 2019
Pancracio is murdered and his family wants revenge. Aurora gains more followers in her war against Vicente. Aurora's new business begins, now she will grow cocaine.
40	"El jefe de jefes"	27 January 2019
Manuela tries to pass drugs to the United States. Vicente is in big trouble with Mariano.
41	"Débora es descubierta"	27 January 2019
Aurora starts off badly on her way as a drug carrier, the authorities discover her. Débora's trick to make Baltazar believe that she expects his son loses its effect when they capture the real father.
42	"A buen precio"	27 January 2019
Aurora and her men manage to reach the buyer of their merchandise in the United States and sell it at a good price. Yuliana and Tabatha promote their new spa, while Manuela is in trouble.
43	"Grave peligro"	3 February 2019
Aurora and her men accomplish their mission, they are back after the successful sale of the drug. The lives of Aurora and Vicente are in grave danger because of Salvador's betrayal and Baltazar's opportunism.
44	"La inauguración del spa"	3 February 2019
Both Aurora and Vicente manage to escape the siege of Baltazar and the ministerials that were sent by Mariano to assassinate them. Tabatha and Yuliana live differently after the inauguration of their spa, an example of honesty in Tierra Blanca.
45	"La alianza"	3 February 2019
A momentary alliance is formed between Aurora and Vicente to get rid of Baltazar. Tabatha undergoes one of the worst moments of her life when she is tortured by Commander Edwin, to get information from where Aurora is located.
46	"Toda la verdad"	3 February 2019
Vicente tells Aurora how her father was deceived and takes the opportunity to reveal that he is in love with Gabriela. Despite the torture, Tabatha remains firm in her silence.
47	"La imagen de Vicente"	10 February 2019
Aurora, desperate not to find Tabatha, asks Vicente for help. Mariano gives the order to Baltazar and Commander Edwin to damage the image of Vicente and eliminate Aurora in passing.
48	"Me voy a entregar"	10 February 2019
Vicente shows sensitivity: he says goodbye to everyone, because he intends to give himself to Baltazar in exchange for the release of Tabatha. Salvador threatens Manuela, Magnolia and Yuliana that he will take the two spas as part of the payment of the debt.
49	"El intercambio"	10 February 2019
Vicente's delivery is not easy, but in the end the exchange happens. Tabatha is free, but as soon as she is safe, Caridad starts the shooting in an attempt to eliminate Baltazar, so Vicente's life is in danger.
50	"La intervención"	10 February 2019
Teresa asks Débora to intervene so that Baltazar does not kill Vicente, but she does not help him; on the contrary, she infuriates when she finds out that Vicente is in love with Gabriela.
51	"Por amor a su hermana"	17 February 2019
Vicente's life is in danger: Baltazar, Mariano and Débora want him dead. For the only person that Vincente's life has value is for Gabriela, who asks Aurora to help him. So, out of love for her sister, he agrees to help him.
52	"Malheridos"	17 February 2019
Aurora and her men manage to rescue Vicente, but before leaving, Baltazar manages to shoot him. Vicente is badly hurt. In the middle of the shooting, Yuliana is also injured.
53	"La orden"	17 February 2019
Teresa and Luciano take Vicente urgently to the hospital. Vicente asks that Gabriela be notified.
54	"La nueva patrona"	17 February 2019
Vicente is veiled in the presence of friends and family. But the moment becomes dangerous when Débora, who thinks she is the new leader, sees Gabriela arrive and points her gun at her. Aurora is in defense of her sister.
55	"El último adiós"	24 February 2019
Everyone says goodbye to Vicente for the last time in the cemetery. Baltazar and his accomplices plan on how to get rid of Aurora. To Susana's surprise, Baltazar waits at her house with several flower arrangements.
56	"Las ganancias"	24 February 2019
Gabriela is very affected by Vicente's death and rejects the approaches of Celestino. Aurora asks to gather the peasants to give them their share of the profits.
57	"Candidato a la alcaldía"	24 February 2019
Aurora and her men must help the peasants to till the fields to finish paying their debts. Mariano demands Baltazar to run for mayor.
58	"El formulario"	24 February 2019
Baltazar is running for mayor of Tierra Blanca, but upon arrival, he does not know how to fill out the form. Aurora has to send Chole and Gabriela to Guadalajara with Sergio, who is upset to see what his sister became.
59	"Los bienes de Vicente"	3 March 2019
Baltazar hires Susana to help him with his image in the campaign to be elected mayor. Tabatha is invited by Raúl to his concert and all the girls come together. Débora, as owner and mistress, wants to take possession of the property that belonged to Vicente.
60	"Con dedicatoria especial"	3 March 2019
Aurora and the girls go to Raúl's concert, where Yuliana goes up to sing, dedicating a song of spite to Baltazar. But he does not like to be discovered and threatens her with his weapon.
61	"La quiero muerta"	3 March 2019
In the concert the tension continues. Tabatha sings and then Raúl goes on stage, and makes Salvador look very badly in front of the audience and challenges El Toro to come up as well. Baltazar tells his men that Aurora can not leave the concert alive.
62	"El enfrentamiento"	3 March 2019
Raúl leaves triumphant from the singing confrontation against El Toro. Although Aurora tries to protect her friends, Manuela is kidnapped by Salvador after the concert.
63	"Préstame dinero"	10 March 2019
Salvador, El Farras and El Escorpión take El Toro to a desolate field, there they force Manuela to commit an atrocity. Débora loses her baby. Candelario borrows money to go with the psychologist.
64	"Interesada"	10 March 2019
Aurora starts a race to finish with Baltazar. Celestino, trying to forget about Gabriela, takes a woman to his ranch, but she is a gold-digger and looks for ways to get money.
65	"El discurso"	10 March 2019
Aurora manages to exchange drugs and money with El Duende, but Mariana sees them and unleashes a shootout. Baltazar finds his speech, although he ends up saying what people want to hear. Magnolia confesses something very important to Mariano.
66	"El secuestro"	10 March 2019
Aurora is worried because she does not El Trueno, who was kidnapped by Baltazar to give a private concert at his home. Manuela gets more drugs to transport, but Magnolia reproaches her for what she is doing.
67	"La llamada"	17 March 2019
Trueno sings along with his people, but before leaving, Baltazar demands that he call Aurora to come to his ranch so he can trap her. But Trueno refuses and Baltazar demands for him to be killed.
68	"Desesperado"	17 March 2019
Candelario goes in search of Trueno, but they catch him and, to escape from the warehouse where Salvador tortures them, the only way out is for Candelario to commit a madness.
69	"Las pérdidas"	17 March 2019
Aurora has just lost her best and most faithful man, while Celestino, her soul brother. Commander Edwin kills Candelario. Luciano and Prometeo cover Aurora, then she rescues El Trueno.
70	"La escapatoria"	17 March 2019
Aurora, worried about El Trueno's wound, shoots to protect him. Salvador and El Tucano, seeing that they outnumber them, leave El Escorpión and two policemen more distracting Aurora, while they escape.
71	"La victoria"	24 March 2019
Aurora feels lost because everyone blames her for the death of Candelario and El Trueno. The pain is very big. Baltazar celebrates his victory against Aurora and Mariano, but asks for one more head, that of Salvador.
72	"Debate político"	24 March 2019
Baltazar is the winner of the political debate against Romero, the rival candidate for mayor. Chole tells Aurora her story with Mariano. Celestino trades Paula for the car of a friend.
73	"Destrozos en la hacienda"	24 March 2019
Débora, Teresa and Luciano destroy Baltazar's estate, Teresa kills his roosters.
74	"La tortura"	24 March 2019
Tabatha and Yuliana leave Baltazar furious, after attacking him in the restaurant. Aurora is tortured by Colonel Severo and Greck to obtain information from the drug traffickers of Tierra Blanca, but Aurora does not say anything.
75	"Los narcos de Tierra Blanca"	31 March 2019
Aurora is released, but she does not say a word about the drug traffickers of Tierra Blanca. Baltazar puts a price on Teresa's head for the death of his roosters, but neither she nor Débora fears him, they want to face him.
76	"Su destino"	31 March 2019
Baltazar is besieged by Severo and Greck. Major Edwin, before being captured, fatally wounds Caridad. Then, Aurora and Celestino take him to Candelario's mother to decide his fate.
77	"La venganza de Celestino"	31 March 2019
Celestino takes revenge on Major Edwin, he kills him in a cruel way. Aurora continues to lose the people she loves. Caridad dies and Manuela is shot, she is torn between life and death.
78	"La revelación"	31 March 2019
Before dying, Salvador reveals to Aurora that it was Leonidas who ordered the killing of Don Rafael, Aurora is stunned. Teresa learns that Débora tried to kill Vicente and vents her anger on Salvador.
79	"El velorio"	7 April 2019
Tabatha and Yuliana take Manuela's body to be arranged for the wake. Aurora takes prisoner Colonel Cienfuegos in her plan to go against Baltazar, who in turn celebrates in advance his victory in the elections.
80	"Baltazar, capturado"	7 April 2019
Aurora and her group manage to set a trap and capture Baltazar. When they are questioning him about Rafael's death, Colonel Cienfuegos calls Aurora to give her a deadline to kill Marino or he will end her.
81	"La Buchona más poderosa"	7 April 2019
Yuliana and Baltazar go to jail. Débora is disabled and lives with Teresa and Luciano. Aurora disappears, but remains alive, while Chole looks for her and Gabriela lives her love with Celestino. Tabatha is now the most powerful Buchona of Tierra Blanca.
