= Cindy la Regia =

- Theatrical release poster
- Directed by: Catalina Aguilar Mastretta; Santiago Limón
- Written by: María Hinojos
- Starring: Cassandra Sánchez Navarro
- Cinematography: Carmen Cabana
- Edited by: Martha Poly Vil
- Production company: Draco Films
- Distributed by: Videocine
- Release date: 25 January 2020 (Mexico)
- Country: Mexico
- Language: Spanish
- Box office: MX$106 million ($5.32 million)

Cindy la Regia is a 2020 Mexican comedy film directed by Catalina Aguilar Mastretta and Santiago Limón. Ricardo Cucamonga created the character that inspired the film, which stars Cassandra Sánchez Navarro as the lead. It premiered on 24 January 2020 and grossed 106 million pesos in its theatrical run in Mexico, placing it among the country's highest-grossing produced films of all time.

== Plot ==
Cindy (Cassandra Sánchez Navarro), a privileged young woman from San Pedro, Nuevo León, runs away from her home and her boyfriend, El Gran Partidazo, to Mexico City. In the capital, she finds new friendships and unexpected opportunities, realizing that her potential is far greater than she previously thought.

== Cast ==
- Cassandra Sánchez Navarro as Cindy La Regia
- Regina Blandón as Angie
- Diana Bovio as Estrella
- Roberto Quijano as Gus
- Marianna Burelli as Laura
- Giuseppe Gamba as Mateo
- Mayra Batalla as Mary
- Nicolasa Ortíz Monasterio as Rox
- Diego Amozurrutia as Eduardo
- Isela Vega as Mercedes
