= Vix (streaming service) =

Mexican-American streaming video service

ViX
- Former name: PrendeTV (2021–2022)
- Website type: OTT platform
- Available in: Spanish
- Headquarters: Miami, Florida, U.S.
- Area served: United States, Hispanic America and Spain
- Owner: TelevisaUnivision
- Products: ViX Originals
- Services: Streaming television; Video on demand
- Website: vix.com
- Advertising: Yes
- Registration: Optional; Required for viewing certain content and ViX Premium
- Launched: March 30, 2021; 5 years ago
- Current status: Operating

Vix (stylized as ViX) is an over-the-top streaming television service owned and operated by TelevisaUnivision. The service primarily shows content either owned by TelevisaUnivision or acquired from third-party content providers, including television series, movies, and sports programming.

Originally launched in the United States as PrendeTV on March 30, 2021, the service was merged with TelevisaUnivision's other streaming services under its current branding on March 31, 2022.

== History ==
The Vix brand has its origins from Batanga Media, an Hispanic digital media company founded in 1999 as Planet Networks. Vix was launched as a website in 2015, and two years later, Batanga Media would rebrand under the Vix name in 2017.

On January 13, 2021, Univision announced the impending launch of PrendeTV, an ad-supported streaming service, in the first quarter of 2021. On February 1, 2021, Univision acquired Vix, which at the time was considered to be the largest Spanish-language AVOD (Ad-Supported Video on Demand) service. PrendeTV was launched in the United States on March 30, 2021, with the Vix brand being retained outside the country. On May 3, 2021, less than a month after merging with Televisa to form TelevisaUnivision, the company announced that it had acquired the television rights for Euro 2020 for PrendeTV and TUDN, as well as acquiring rights for Brazilian and Argentine leagues.

In June 2021, TelevisaUnivision announced the launch of a new combined streaming service that would bring together PrendeTV, Vix, Univision Now, and Blim TV under one name in 2022. In February 2022, it was announced that PrendeTV, Blim TV, and the original Vix AVOD service acquired in 2021 would be merged into the AVOD tier of a relaunched Vix in March. The company also announced the launch of a Subscription Video on Demand (SVOD) tier called Vix+, which would feature premium series & films and live sporting events (including FIFA World Cup Qatar 2022) for Mexican audiences. Vix+ would launch on July 21, 2022.

In April 2023, the name Vix+ was phased out and would be unified with the Vix brand. In an article from Deadline, TelevisaUnivision CEO Wade Davis said in a conference call with Wall Street analysts that eliminating the "+" from the name "will not change the strategy at all, they will only improve the service as Vix for free with advertising and its paid version." Vix+ was rebranded as Vix Premium.

Sometime around 2024, Vix was abruptly discontinued in Brazil.

In December 2024, TelevisaUnivision and Atresmedia announced an agreement for the launch of Vix in Spain through Atresplayer starting in January 2025. It thus became available in Spain on January 28, 2025.

In May 2025, TelevisaUnivision and Disney Entertainment announced a multiregional distribution deal. Since June 9 in Mexico, Vix Premium subscription includes access to Disney+ Standard with Ads. In the US, as of June 3, TelevisaUnivision channels were added to Hulu + Live TV.

== Programming ==
ViX's programing includes classic TV, documentaries, television series, films, and sports programming and telenovelas from Televisa's telenovela library.

=== Drama ===
Title	Genre	Premiere	Seasons	Status
La mujer del diablo	Drama	July 21, 2022	3 seasons, 26 episodes	Ended
María Félix: La Doña	Biopic	July 21, 2022	1 season, 8 episodes	Ended
Turbia	Drama	August 25, 2022	1 season, 6 episodes	Ended
Marea alta	Thriller	September 9, 2022	1 season, 10 episodes	Ended
Mujeres asesinas	Drama	November 4, 2022	3 seasons, 24 episodes	Renewed
La rebelión	Thriller	November 17, 2022	1 season, 6 episodes	Ended
Travesuras de la niña mala	Drama	December 8, 2022	1 season, 10 episodes	Ended
Volver a caer	Drama	January 20, 2023	1 season, 6 episodes	Ended
El colapso	Dystopian	February 10, 2023	8 episodes	Miniseries
Noche de chicas	Thriller	February 24, 2023	6 episodes	Miniseries
Las pelotaris 1926	Drama	March 10, 2023	1 season, 8 episodes	Ended
Montecristo	Drama	April 14, 2023	1 season, 6 episodes	Ended
Isla brava	Thriller	May 18, 2023	2 season, 16 episodes	Ended
Más allá de ti	Crime thriller	May 26, 2023	1 season, 8 episodes	Ended
Senda prohibida	Drama	June 23, 2023	3 seasons, 21 episodes	Ended
Paraíso blanco	Drama	July 20, 2023	2 seasons, 30 episodes	Ended
Gloria Trevi: Ellas soy yo	Biopic	August 11, 2023	1 season, 50 episodes	Ended
Ella camina sola	Thriller	September 29, 2023	1 season, 10 episodes	Ended
El gallo de oro	Drama	October 20, 2023	2 seasons, 20 episodes	Ended
La hora marcada	Horror anthology	October 27, 2023	1 season, 9 episodes	Ended
Pacto de sangre	Crime drama	November 10, 2023	2 seasons, 20 episodes	Ended
Se llamaba Pedro Infante	Biopic	December 1, 2023	1 season, 8 episodes	Ended
El extraño retorno de Diana Salazar	Drama	May 17, 2024	3 seasons, 24 episodes	Ended
La sustituta	Thriller drama	June 28, 2024	1 season, 51 episodes	Ended
Juegos interrumpidos	Drama	August 30, 2024	2 seasons, 20 episodes	Ended
Con esa misma mirada	Drama	March 21, 2025	3 seasons, 24 episodes	Ended
Camino a Arcadia	Drama	August 8, 2025	1 season, 6 episodes	Ended
El Mochaorejas	Crime drama	January 23, 2026	1 season, 8 episodes	Ended
Polen	Thriller	March 6, 2026	1 season, 10 episodes	Pending
El precio de la fama	Thriller	May 29, 2026	1 season, 8 episodes	Pending
Una familia complicada	Drama	June 26, 2026	1 season, 20 episodes	Ended
Timbiriche	Biopic	October 9, 2026	1 season, 8 episodes	Pending
Yo no creo en los hombres	Drama	October 30, 2026	1 season, 11 episodes	Ended

=== Comedy ===
Title	Genre	Premiere	Seasons	Status
Sobreviviendo a los 30s	Comedy drama	August 12, 2022	1 season, 10 episodes	Ended
Viva la Comedy	Comedy	March 16, 2023	1 season, 6 episodes	Ended
Los artistas: primeros trazos	Comedy drama	July 7, 2023	1 season, 10 episodes	Ended
Cualquier parecido	Comedy drama	August 25, 2023	1 season, 7 episodes	Ended
Pinches momias	Comedy horror	September 1, 2023	1 season, 8 episodes	Ended
Lalola	Comedy drama	February 2, 2024	2 seasons, 19 episodes	Ended
Un buen divorcio	Romantic comedy	March 1, 2024	1 season, 10 episodes	Ended
Consuelo	Comedy drama	April 19, 2024	2 seasons, 20 episodes	Ended
Profe infiltrado	Sitcom	June 7, 2024	2 seasons, 16 episodes	Ended
Oríllese a la orilla	Sitcom	July 12, 2024	2 season, 24 episodes	Pending
Y llegaron de noche	Workplace comedy	October 4, 2024	1 season, 7 episodes	Ended
Riquísimos, por cierto	Sitcom	February 7, 2025	2 seasons, 30 episodes	Pending
Papá soltero	Sitcom	June 13, 2025	2 seasons, 20 episodes	Ended
Cómplices	Comedy drama	November 7, 2025	1 season, 13 episodes	Pending
Bodas S.A.	Comedy	February 13, 2026	1 season, 10 episodes	Pending
Los encantos del sinvergüenza	Comedy drama	April 24, 2026	1 season, 20 episodes	Ended
Circo Gómez	Adult animated sitcom	June 5, 2026	1 season, 10 episodes	Pending
La Banda	Heist comedy drama	July 24, 2026	1 season, 8 episodes	Pending
Hotel todo incluido	Fantasy comedy	August 28, 2026	1 season, 16 episodes	Pending

=== Microdramas ===
Title	Premiere	Episodes
Destinada a ser la dueña	July 21, 2025	60 episodes
El regreso de la heredera fugitiva	July 21, 2025	66 episodes
Intensamente Victoria	July 21, 2025	59 episodes
¡Mamá, no me dejes morir!	July 21, 2025	71 episodes
Me fui gata volví perra	July 21, 2025	62 episodes
Te escribí antes de conocerte	July 21, 2025	60 episodes

=== Unscripted ===
==== Docuseries ====
Title	Genre	Premiere	Seasons	Status
Mi vecino, el cartel	Docuseries	July 21, 2022	1 season, 3 episodes	Ended
Cenizas de la gloria	Sport	September 22, 2022	1 season, 6 episodes	Ended
Los exorcistas	Paranormal	October 20, 2022	1 season, 6 episodes	Ended
Al grito de guerra	Sport	October 27, 2022	1 season, 6 episodes	Ended
Informe Qatar	Sport	November 3, 2022	1 season, 6 episodes	Ended
Promesas y milagros	Religious	December 12, 2022	1 season, 6 episodes	Ended
El show, crónica de un asesinato	Docuseries	June 7, 2023	1 season, 5 episodes	Ended
Nunca tuvo miedo	Docuseries	June 30, 2023	1 season, 5 episodes	Ended
El Apóstol	Docuseries	September 14, 2023	1 season, 4 episodes	Ended
Reconexión: México	Travel	January 5, 2024	1 season, 10 episodes	Pending
¿Qué onda con los 80?	Docuseries	March 8, 2024	1 season, 3 episodes	Ended
Archivo negro: Sombras del crimen	True crime	June 13, 2024	1 season, 5 episodes	Ended
Tigres: La historia perfecta	Sport	July 20, 2024	1 season, 6 episodes	Ended
Lebaron, muerte en la tierra prometida	Docuseries	November 1, 2024	1 season, 4 episodes	Pending
Mi mundo	Music	January 24, 2025	1 season, 8 episodes	Pending
#Todas. Debanhi, una Historia de Redes	Docuseries	March 6, 2025	1 season, 3 episodes	Ended
Anatomía del mal, el caso	Docuseries	March 10, 2025	1 season, 4 episodes	Ended
Solo para mujeres: la docuserie	Docuseries	May 9, 2025	1 season, 4 episodes	Ended
Al chile	Docuseries	May 29, 2025	1 season, 4 episodes	Ended
Chávez vs. Chávez	Docuseries	September 11, 2026	1 season, 5 episodes	Ended

==== Reality ====
Title	Genre	Premiere	Seasons	Status
La noche del diablito	Reality	October 13, 2022	2 seasons, 16 episodes	Ended
La loca de los perros	Reality	January 12, 2023	1 season, 8 episodes	Ended
Enamorándonos: La isla	Reality	April 20, 2023	1 season, 11 episodes	Ended
Wendy, perdida pero famosa	Reality	October 5, 2023	1 season, 13 episodes	Ended
Chiquis sin filtro	Reality	August 16, 2024	2 seasons, 22 episodes	Pending
Lucha de antojos	Reality competition	September 19, 2024	1 season, 8 episodes	Pending
Ninel Conde sin filtro	Reality	August 14, 2026	1 season, 4 episodes	Pending

=== Co-productions ===
These programs have been commissioned by Vix in cooperation with a partner network.

Title	Partner	Genre	Premiere	Seasons	Vix exclusive regions	Status
De viaje con los Derbez (season 3) (Note: The series previously aired on Pantaya, which was acquired by TelevisaUnivision.)	Amazon Prime Video	Documentary comedy	October 18, 2019	4 seasons, 30 episodes	United States	Pending
Ana (season 3)	Amazon Prime Video	Comedy drama	April 20, 2020	3 seasons, 22 episodes	United States	Ended
El juego de las llaves (season 3)	Amazon Prime Video	Comedy drama	August 16, 2019	3 seasons, 24 episodes	United States	Ended
Par de idiotas	Amazon Prime Video	Reality	March 7, 2025	1 season, 3 episodes	United States	Pending

=== Exclusive international distribution ===
These programs, even though ViX has announced them as ViX Originals, are programs that have been aired in different countries, and ViX has bought exclusive distribution rights to stream them in other various countries. They may be available on ViX in their home territory and other markets where ViX does not have the first run license, without the ViX Original label, some time after their first-run airing on their original broadcaster.

Title	Genre	Original network	Original region	Vix exclusive regions	Seasons	Original run
Ana de nadie	Drama	RCN Televisión	Colombia	All other markets except Colombia	1 season, 91 episodes	2023
Antidisturbios	Police procedural/Thriller	Movistar+	Spain	United States	1 season, 6 episodes	2020
Apagón	Anthology/Science fiction	Movistar+	Spain	All other markets	1 season, 5 episodes	2022
Cardo	Drama	Atresplayer Premium	Spain	All other markets	1 season, 6 episodes	2021
Casados con hijos	Sitcom	Sony Channel	Mexico	United States	1 season, 10 episodes	2024
El juicio	Drama	Amazon Prime Video	Mexico	United States	1 season, 8 episodes	2026
Entre sombras	Drama	Caracol Televisión	Colombia	All other markets except Colombia	1 season, 40 episodes	2022
Hierro	Mystery thriller	Movistar+; Arte	Spain; France	United States	2 seasons, 14 episodes	2019–21
La edad de la ira	Teen drama	ATRESplayer Premium	Spain	All other markets	1 season, 4 episodes	2022
La nieta elegida	Drama	RCN Televisión	Colombia	All other markets except Colombia	1 season, 81 episodes	2021–22
Los Prisioneros	Biopic	Movistar TV App	Chile	All other markets	1 season, 8 episodes	2022
Pena ajena	Comedy	Pantaya	United States	All other markets except United States	1 season, 10 episodes	2022
Rapa	Crime thriller	Movistar+	Spain	All other markets	1 season, 6 episodes	2022
Raphaelismo	Documentary	Movistar+	Spain	All other markets	1 season, 4 episodes	2022
Skam España	Teen drama	Movistar+	Spain	All other markets	4 seasons, 39 episodes	2018–20
Tía Alison	Drama	RCN Televisión	Colombia	All other markets except Colombia	1 season, 62 episodes	2023
Todas las flores	Drama	Globoplay	Brasil	All other markets	1 season, 85 episodes	2022–23

=== Original films ===
Title	Genre	Premiere
Cocino cuando te extraño	Documentary	July 21, 2022
Mirreyes contra Godínez 2: El retiro	Comedy	July 21, 2022
Enfermo amor	Romantic comedy	July 27, 2022
30 días para ganar	Documentary	July 28, 2022
Las leyendas: el origen	Family	August 10, 2022
Me case con un idiota	Comedy	August 24, 2022
Las Vocales	Comedy	August 31, 2022
Presencias	Thriller	September 7, 2022
El vestido de la novia	Horror	October 12, 2022
MexZombies	Comedy horror	October 26, 2022
Amores permitidos	Romantic comedy	November 23, 2022
No abras la puerta	Horror	November 30, 2022
Huevitos congelados	Family	December 14, 2022
Juntos pero no revueltos	Comedy	January 11, 2023
Atrapadas en familia	Romantic comedy	February 1, 2023
Malcriados	Romantic comedy	February 8, 2023
Mi maestra se comió a mi amigo	Comedy horror	March 29, 2023
María: la diva eterna	Documentary	April 6, 2023
Quiero tu vida	Romantic fantasy	May 3, 2023
Bendita suegra	Comedy	May 10, 2023
La leyenda de los Chaneques	Family	July 14, 2023
Dime lo que quieres (de verdad)	Romantic comedy	July 27, 2023
Oaxaca, una promesa hecha pueblo	Documentary	July 29, 2023
Me vuelves loca	Comedy	September 7, 2023
¿Quieres ser mi hijo?	Romantic comedy	September 21, 2023
El sabor de la Navidad	Drama	November 16, 2023
Por Siempre RBD	Concert film	December 25, 2023
Es por su bien	Comedy	June 21, 2024

==== Exclusive international distribution films ====
These products, even though Vix lists them as ViX Originals, are films that have been released in different countries, and ViX has bought exclusive distribution rights to stream them in other various countries. They may be available on ViX in their home territory and other markets where ViX does not have the first run license, without the ViX Original label.

First screening	Title	Genre	Original region	Vix exclusive regions
July 15, 2021	Los días que no estuve	Drama	Mexico	United States
September 13, 2021	La hija	Thriller	Spain	All other markets
September 18, 2021	Maixabel	Drama	Spain	All other markets
October 15, 2021	El lodo	Thriller	Spain	All other markets
October 28, 2021	Los minutos negros	Thriller	Mexico	All other markets except United States
October 29, 2021	Érase una vez en Euskadi	Drama	Spain	All other markets
February 17, 2022	¡Qué despadre!	Comedy	Mexico	All other markets
March 27, 2022	Llenos de gracia	Comedy	Spain	All other markets
April 21, 2022	Sin ti no puedo	Drama	Mexico	United States
April 28, 2022	En la mira	Drama	Argentina	United States
August 12, 2022	Por los pelos	Comedy	Spain	All other markets
August 19, 2022	Un parcero en Nueva York	Comedy	Colombia	All other markets
September 2, 2022	El test	Comedy	Spain	All other markets
September 16, 2022	Modelo 77	Thriller	Spain	All other markets
November 24, 2022	Dónde los pájaros van a morir	Comedy	Mexico	All other markets
December 29, 2022	Malvada	Comedy	Mexico	All other markets
January 26, 2023	Infelices para siempre	Comedy	Mexico	United States
March 2, 2023	Nada que ver	Comedy	Mexico	All other markets
April 12, 2023	La usurpadora, el musical	Musical romantic comedy	Mexico	All other markets
January 18, 2024	El roomie	Romantic comedy	Mexico	All other markets
March 8, 2024	Noche de bodas	Romantic comedy	Mexico	All other markets

=== Sports programming ===
ViX also carries sports programming, in conjunction with TUDN.

The service has picked up other domestic football events as well, including the Argentine Primera División, Brasileirão, Peru's Primera División and Colombia's Categoría Primera A for the United States.

==== Current broadcasting rights ====
===== Mexico =====
Event	Broadcast partner(s)	Dates	Notes
Football
FIFA World Cup	Las Estrellas, Canal 5, TUDN	2022, 2026;	2026: All 104 matches exclusive on Vix
Mexico national football team	Canal 5, TUDN	2022–;	
Liga MX	Las Estrellas, Canal 5, TUDN	2022–;	Select games
Liga MX Femenil	Nueve, TUDN	2022–;	Select games
Liga de Expansión MX	TUDN	2022–;	Select games
Campeón de Campeones	Las Estrellas, TUDN	2022–;	
CONCACAF Nations League		2022–;	Select matches
CONCACAF Gold Cup	Las Estrellas, Canal 5, TUDN	2023–;	
Campeones Cup	TUDN	2022–;	
La Liga	Canal 5	2022–;	One match per week
Americas Kings League	TUDN, Kings Organization	2024	Only the First Split, started from Matchday 3
American Football
National Football League	Canal 5, Nueve	2022–;	Select matches
Baseball
Major League Baseball	Nueve	2022–;	Select matches
World Baseball Classic	Canal 5, Nueve	2026	All Mexico matches, one semifinal and a final
Multi-sports Events
Summer Olympic Games	Canal 5, Nueve, TUDN	2024, 2028, 2032	
Winter Olympic Games	Nueve	2026, 2030	

===== United States =====
Event	Broadcast partner(s)	Dates	Notes
Football
Mexico national football team	Univision, UniMás, TUDN	2022–;	
Liga MX	Univision, UniMás, TUDN	2022–;	Select games
Liga MX Femenil	TUDN	2022–;	Select games
Liga de Expansión MX	TUDN	2022–;	Select games
UEFA Champions League	Univision, UniMás, TUDN	2022–;	
UEFA Europa League	Univision, UniMás, TUDN	2022–;	
UEFA Conference League	Univision, UniMás, TUDN	2022–;	
UEFA Nations League	Univision, UniMás, TUDN	2022–;	
UEFA International Friendlies	Univision, UniMás, TUDN	2022–;	
UEFA European Championship	Univision, UniMás, TUDN	2024–;	
UEFA European Championship qualifying	Univision, UniMás, TUDN	2023–;	
Copa América	Univision, UniMás, TUDN	2024–;	
Copa América Femenina		2022–;	
Categoría Primera A		2022–;	Select matches
CONCACAF Nations League		2022–;	Select matches
CONCACAF Gold Cup	Univision, UniMás, TUDN	2023–;	
CONCACAF W Championship	TUDN	2022–;	
CONCACAF Champions Cup	TUDN	2022–;	
Campeones Cup	TUDN	2022–;	
Argentine Primera Division		2026–;	
Baseball			
Major League Baseball	UniMás	2022–;	Select matches
Mixed martial arts
Combate Global	Univision	2023–;	

== Batanga Media ==
Batanga Media was an independent digital media company serving the U.S. Hispanic and Latin American markets. Batanga Media's digital properties include Batanga.com, Batanga Radio, iMujer.com, and BolsadeMulher.com. Founded in 1999 by Troy McConnell, Luis Brandwayn and Jochen Fischer in North Carolina, Batanga Media is now headquartered in Miami, Florida with operations in 14 countries including Brazil, Chile, Colombia, Mexico, Peru, and Venezuela.

Batanga Radio was an online music streaming service owned and operated by Batanga Media. Batanga Radio users stream millions of songs per year and create over hundreds of thousands of custom stations every month. Batanga Radio was built to be an online radio application. Batanga Radio users can “tell” the application to add or remove certain artists, songs, genres and even decades of music. Batanga Radio's playlist technology reacts to user interactions and a user’s location. Song lyrics are available on every song page and as every song plays. With every song that plays on Batanga Radio, users receive a list of five similar tracks to explore, listen to and/or add to their playlists. Using the songs and artists already chosen by users, the application identifies new songs that are similar. Batanga Radio is accessible across mobile and tablet devices. In 2016, Batanga Media and Discovery Networks became partners.

In early 2017, Batanga Media announced the change of its name to Vix.com, and described their new editorial line and approach as follows: "We create content that sparks curiosity and adds value to millions of people every day. Our content lives in English, Spanish and Portuguese on Vix.com, and across a variety of social platforms such as Facebook, Instagram, and YouTube. With over 50 million social followers, our content reaches over 325 million people and our videos receive more than 1 billion views every month. We are proud to be the largest independent digital media content company for the U.S Hispanic market, Latin America and Brazil."
