= List of Señora Acero characters =

Señora Acero is an American-Mexican television series developed by Argos Comunicación and Telemundo Studios, based on an original idea of Roberto Stopello. As of the third season, the series was renamed to Señora Acero: La Coyote. The series premiered on September 23, 2014 in the United States on Telemundo television network, and concluded on January 29, 2019.

Set and filmed in Mexico and United States, Seasons 1 and 2 tell the story of Sara Aguilar, a beautiful housewife, who by obligation ends up becoming the most powerful drug and money laundering trafficker in Mexico to protect her son and her friends. Season 3 until series finale focuses on the life of Vicenta Acero, better known as La Coyote, who helps immigrants cross the Mexican border to fulfill the American dream of thousands of Mexicans fleeing their country of origin because of drug traffickers and corrupt politicians.

== Character appearances ==
Actor	Character	Season				
Actor	Character	1	2	3	4	5
=== Main characters ===
Blanca Soto	Sara Aguilar	Main	Main			
Litzy	Aracely Paniagua	Main	Main	Main		
Damián Alcázar	Vicente Acero	Main (Note: Despite only appearing in a few episodes, is credited as main.)		Stand-in (Note: In season 3, Alcázar only appears as archive footage, but in some episodes another unknown actor appears playing the character.)		
Marco Pérez	Felipe Murillo	Main				
Jorge Zárate	Amaro Rodríguez "El Indio"	Main	Main	Main	Recurring	
Rossana San Juan	Mariana Huerdo	Main				
Andrés Palacios	Eliodoro Flores Tarso	Main				
Rebecca Jones	Enriqueta Sabido	Main				
José Luis Reséndez	Acasio Martínez "El Teca" (Note: In season 2, Reséndez played a double role playing Alfredo Díaz a twin brother of El Teca.)	Main	Main		Guest	
William Miller	Acasio Martínez "El Teca"					Main (Note: Miller replaced Reséndez in season 5.)
Lincoln Palomeque	Manuel Caicedo	Main	Main	Main		
Alejandro Calva	Miguel Quintanilla	Recurring	Main			
Carolina Miranda	Vicenta Acero			Main	Main	Main
Luis Ernesto Franco	Daniel Phillips			Main	Main	
Sergio Goyri	Jesús "Chucho" Casares			Main		
Laura Flores	Edelmira Rigores			Main		
Josemaría Torre Hütt	Larry Pérez "El Cheneque"			Main		
Ana Lucía Domínguez	Marta Mónica Restrepo "La Tuti"	Recurring	Main	Main	Main	Recurring
Gaby Espino	Indira Cárdenas			Main (Note: Despite appearing at the end of the season 3 credits, Espino is credited as principal by various sources.)	Main	
Diego Cadavid	Julián Romero				Main	Guest
David Chocarro	Alberto Fuentes					Main
Paulina Gaitán	Leticia Moreno					Main
Mauricio Islas	Héctor Ruiz					Main
María Rojo	Mercedes "La Mecha"					Main
=== Recurring characters ===
Carmen Madrid	Cornelia Ríos	Recurring				
Arturo Barba	Junio Acero	Recurring				
Luciana Silveyra	Berta Aguilar	Recurring	Recurring			
Valentina Acosta	Miriam Godoy	Recurring	Recurring			
Pilar Ixquic Mata	Carlota Bermúdez de Aguilar	Recurring				
Andrés Zúñiga	Orlando Carabias "El Empanada"	Recurring				
Viviana Serna	Guadalupe "Lupita" González	Recurring				
Juan Carlos Martín del Campo	Rufino Valdés	Recurring				
Aurora Gil	Josefina Aguilar	Recurring	Recurring	Recurring	Recurring	Recurring
Alejandro Caso	Juan Parra "El Alimaña"	Recurring				
Héctor Berzunza	Arnulfo Beltrán	Recurring				
Sergio Lozano	Joaquín Fernández	Recurring	Recurring			
Martín Barba	Joaquín Fernández	Guest (Note: Barba replaced Lozano during some episodes of season 1.)				
Iñaki Goci	José Francisco Sánchez "El Tiburón"	Recurring				
Alex Peraza	Comendante Cortés	Recurring				
Raúl Aranda-Lee	Pedro Arroyo	Recurring				
Alan Castillo	Salvador Acero	Recurring (Note: The actor played the character during his time as a child.)				
Patricio Sebastián	Salvador Acero	Recurring				
Michel Duval	Salvador Acero		Recurring	Recurring	Recurring	Recurring
Andrés Zuno	Plutarco	Recurring	Recurring			
Iliana Fox	Vanessa Creel	Recurring				
Briggitte Bozzo	Patricia Flores	Recurring				
Alberto Agnesi	Marcelo Dóriga	Recurring	Recurring	Recurring	Recurring	
Wilson Figueredo	José Ángel Godoy	Recurring				
Gabriel Santoyo	José Ángel Godoy	Guest				
Mauricio Henao	José Ángel Godoy		Recurring	Recurring	Recurring	
Quetzalli Bulnes	Alicia Requejo	Recurring	Recurring			
Roberto Wohlmuth	Chalino "El Rosca" (Note: In season 1 the actor played El Mudo.)	Recurring	Recurring	Recurring	Recurring	
Liam Cruz	Felipe Quintanilla	(Note: During the first season the character appeared as a baby.)	Recurring			
Santiago Ley	Felipe Quintanilla			Recurring		
Nicolás Chunga	Felipe Quintanilla				Recurring	Guest
Emiliano Zurita	Felipe Quintanilla					Recurring
Christian Sánchez	Diego Machado	Recurring				
==== Introduced in season 2 ====
Carla Hernández	Señorita Clarissa Aldama		Recurring			
Rodrigo Guirao	Mario Casas		Recurring	Recurring	Recurring	
Isabel Burr	Begoña Juárez		Recurring			
Rosario Zúñiga	Rosa Sánchez		Recurring	Recurring	Recurring	
Diego Soldano	Pedro Juárez		Recurring			
Francisco "Pakey" Vázquez	Cristian Jiménez		Recurring			
Astrid Hernandez	Briceida Montero		Recurring		Guest	
Mauricio Martínez	Javier Ferraro		Recurring			
Óscar Priego	El Gallo		Recurring	Recurring	Recurring	Recurring
Claudio Roca	Álvaro Martínez "El Tequita"		Recurring			
Emmanuel Orenday	Horacio Quiroga		Recurring			
Adrián Cue	El Tepo		Recurring	Recurring		
Mario Loría	Heriberto Roca		Recurring		Recurring	
Eduardo Amer	Óscar "El Bebote"		Recurring	Recurring	Recurring	Recurring
Lourdes Reyes	Cayetana Acosta		Recurring		Recurring	
==== Introduced in season 3 ====
Adrián Di Monte	Abelardo Casares			Recurring		
Oka Giner	Rosario Franco			Recurring	Recurring	
Samantha Siqueiros	Rosario Franco					Recurring (Note: Siqueiros replaced Giner during the fifth season.)
Alex Speitzer	Juan Pablo Franco			Recurring		
Shalim Ortiz	Arturo Sánchez			Recurring	Recurring	
Carmen del Valle	Chavela Casares			Recurring		
Alejandro Muñoz	Fabrizio Cárdenas			Recurring		
Nubia Martí	Victoria Phillips			Recurring	Recurring	
Susana Lozano	Consuelo Casares			Recurring		
Justin Ross Martin	Martin Connors			Recurring		
León Peraza	Domingo Alvarado			Recurring	Recurring	
Citlali Anaya	Lorena Casares			Recurring		
Heriberto Méndez	Juez Orlando Jiménez			Recurring		
Irving Peña	David Casares			Recurring		
Coral de la Vega	Ivanna Delgado			Recurring		
Patricia Navidad	Margarita Casanova			Recurring		
Alejandro Oliva	El Chamuco			Recurring		
Haydée Navarra	Ximena Ladrón de Guevara			Recurring	Recurring	
Lucia Silva	Débora Cañizales			Recurring	Recurring	
Jessica Segura	Aida Franco			Recurring	Recurring	Recurring
Javier Escobar	Officer Sergio Mendoza			Recurring	Recurring	
==== Introduced in season 4 ====
Jonathan Islas	Tecolote				Recurring	Recurring
Alberto Casanova	Jorge Araujo				Recurring	
María José Magán	Andrea Dóriga				Recurring	
Alicia Jaziz	Carmen "Carmencita" Plasencia				Recurring	
Benjamín Rivero	Raúl Ricardo Rondón "El Triple"				Recurring	
Mario Escalante	Francisco "Pancho" Panteón				Recurring	
Katia del Pino	Liliana "Lili" Quiroga				Recurring	
Fermín Martínez	Ramiro Núñez "El Jaibo"				Recurring	
Nikolás Caballero	Nicolás Araujo Cárdenas				Recurring	
Tomás Rojas	Eladio Puertas				Recurring	
Martijn Kuiper	Gregory Jones				Recurring	
Yasmary Delgado	Lázara "La Glu Glú"				Recurring	
Felipe Betancourt	Azuceno				Recurring	Recurring
==== Introduced in season 5 ====
Omar Fierro	Christian Almeida					Recurring
Camila Selser	Sofía Gómez					Recurring
Lambda García	Miguel Sandoval					Recurring
Miguel Pizarro	Luciano Antolin					Recurring
Fabián Corres	El Tablas					Recurring
Guillermo Zulueta	Lucas Iglesias					Recurring
Arantza Ruiz	Samantha Peña					Recurring
Tatiana Martinez	Lucía					Recurring
Andrea Portugal	Virginia					Recurring
Ruy Senderos	Bernardo Antolin					Recurring
Luisa Sáenz	Reyna Peña					Recurring
Mauro Sánchez Navarro	Petronilo Godínez "El Marrano Mayor"					Recurring
Silvia Carusillo	Regina					Recurring
Alan Alarcón	Branco					Recurring
Juan Aguirre	Bruto					Recurring
Diana Santos	Iris					Recurring
Ari Placera	Daniel Phillips					Recurring
Cast notes
