= Señora Acero season 5 =

Señora Acero
- Season 5
- Promotional poster
- Starring: Carolina Miranda; David Chocarro; Ana Lucía Domínguez; Paulina Gaitán; William Miller; Mauricio Islas
- No. of episodes: 69

Release
- Original network: Telemundo
- Original release: 15 October 2018 – 29 January 2019

Season chronology
- ← Previous; Season 4

The fifth and final season of the American television series Señora Acero also known as Señora Acero: La Coyote, follows the life of Vicenta Acero, 6 years after the death of her husband Daniel Philips and her new future as a mother. The season was ordered in February 2018, with filming beginning that August. It was later announced that the fifth season would be the final season. Principal cast members Carolina Miranda, Ana Lucía Domínguez, and Diego Cadavid return from previous seasons. The season premiered on 15 October 2018, and concluded on 29 January 2019.

== Plot ==
Pregnant during eight months, the time comes when Vicenta Acero (Carolina Miranda) decides to bury her husband Daniel Philips (Luis Ernesto Franco), who died after six months have been in a coma. During the funeral of her husband, Vicenta communicates anonymously with Alberto Fuentes (David Chocarro) FBI agent to inform him that the murderer of her husband is at the funeral, after following the track of the call, arrives at the funeral in where is Vicenta and he realizes that it was a false alarm and begins to argue with Vicenta. During the discussion, Vicenta begins to give indications of giving birth and there is only time for her to give birth. Alberto of the nothing receives the son of Vicenta and between them a very strong bond is born that unites them immediately.

On the other hand, El Teca (William Miller), who supposedly died at the hands of Salvador Acero (Michel Duval) 5 years ago. El Teca returns after spending 6 years in prison in the United States just to get revenge on the Acero Family, who ended up with his entire family and his cartel. His only goal is to kill Vicenta's son. Vicenta and Salvador both dedicated to the breeding of horses and Josefina and El Gallo dedicated to politics, have been completely isolated from all the problems for 6 years and away from any danger, but suddenly they will be forced to flee when they find out about the repair of El Teca. Who will use unimaginable methods to destroy them all. Meanwhile, La Tuti (Ana Lucía Domínguez) has managed to keep her son out of Mexico thanks to the profits she has obtained in her business of exotic dancers, but she will be forced to be always protected by guaruras, to avoid that El Teca extorts her and wants to take away her son Álvaro.

Despite all her efforts to keep her family together and safe, Vicenta will make a difficult decision; run away from her family and her new love together with her child. Away from her family, Vicenta together with her son will face many dangers, but not everything is bad for her, on the way away from her family and the whole world she meets Lucas Iglesias (Guillermo Zulueta), a hippie who gives her an inn on the beach where he works. In this new refuge, she meets La Mecha (María Rojo), who suddenly becomes a new mother for Vicenta; and Nancy (Patricia Manterola) who becomes her best friend. In this new world in which everyone just wants to defend their children, Vicenta and La Tuti join forces to end El Teca, and thus be able to give their children a better future and to sleep in peace.

== Cast ==
- Carolina Miranda as Vicenta Acero, she is a coyote that is dedicated to crossing migrants on the border, half-sister of Salvador Acero, widow of Daniel Phillips and girlfriend of Alberto Fuentes.
- David Chocarro as Alberto Fuentes, he is an FBI agent, boyfriend of Vicenta
- Ana Lucía Domínguez as La Tuti
- Paulina Gaitán as Leticia Moreno, Corrupted FBI agent and John Floyd's right hand.
- William Miller as Acasio Martínez, the former leader of Tijuana cartel. He be able to take revenge on Acero-Quintanilla clan for murder of his sons Julián and Álvaro. He is amputated on his right arm.
- Mauricio Islas as Héctor Ruiz, he is the corrupted president of Mexico.
- Omar Fierro as Christian Almeida, the director of FBI.
- Michel Duval as Salvador Acero, he is the half-brother of Vicenta, and Rosario's boyfriend. Together with his sister they cross migrants on the border of Mexico. He is killed by El Teca Martínez.
- Emiliano Zurita as Felipe Quintanilla Aguilar
- Aurora Gil as Josefina Aguilar, she is the First Lady of Municipal President of Matamoros, Felipe's mother and El Gallo's wife.
- Óscar Priego as El Gallo, he is the Municipal President of Matamoros. Joesfina's husband, Felipe's father.
- Camila Selser as Sofía Gómez "La Mandrágora“, El Teca's security women.
- Lambda García as Miguel Sandoval, FBI agent, killed by El Bruto, by the orders of El Teca.
- Jonathan Islas as Tecolote, he is a cold-blooded murderer who starts working for El Indio Amaro on the recommendation of Indira. He is killed by Vicenta.
- Patricia Manterola as Nancy Salas
- Mónica Dionne as Rebeca Londoño
- Miguel Pizarro as Venustiano, Rogelio and Bernardo's father, Regina's wife.
- Jessica Segura as Aída Franco, sister of Rosario.
- Fabián Corres as El Tablas
- Samantha Siqueiros as Rosario Franco, she is Salvador's girlfriend, and Aida's sister.
- Guillermo Zuleta as Lucas Iglesias
- Arantza Ruiz as Samantha Peña
- Eduardo Amer as Bebote, is one of the security men of Los Acero. He is killed by Sofia by the orders of El Teca Martínez.
- Tatiana Martínez as Lucía
- Felipe Betancourt as Azuceno, Julian's former security men, now became Aceros’ security men.
- Andrea Portugal as Virginia
- Costanza Andrade as Ana Vega
- Alan Alarcón as El Bronco
- Ruy Senderos as Bernardo
- Juan Aguirre as El Bruto
- Luisa Sáenz as Reyna Peña
- Diana Santos as Iris
- Mauro Sánchez Navarro as Petronilo Godínez Pérez
- Alexander Holtmann as John Floyd, he is the corrupted director of FBI.
- Silvia Carusillo as Regina
- Ari Placera as Danielito
- Dagoberto Gama as Juan Román
- María Rojo as Mercedes Berríos
- Isadora Vives as Elizabeth Acero
- Braulio Aranda as Cuauhtémoc Trujillo
- Manuel Castillo as Álvaro Acasio, son of La Tuti and Alvaro, grandson of El Teca Martínez.

== Episodes ==
No. overall	No. in season	Title	Original release date	US viewers (millions)
319	1	"Vicenta cobra venganza"	15 October 2018	1.39
After the death of Phillips, Vicenta kills Romero, awakening the fury of the worst enemy of Los Acero, El Teca Martínez, who goes after her and her son. Six years later, he kidnaps Danielito.
320	2	"Vicenta rescata a su hijo"	16 October 2018	1.28
In revenge for the death of his son, El Teca sends to kidnap the child of Señora Acero. She chases the raptor, removes him and retrieves Danielito. Alberto and Vicenta meet again.
321	3	"Alberto salva a Vicenta"	17 October 2018	1.29
Alberto goes to great lengths to prove that Vicenta is not responsible for Teca's escape and the murder of the police. El Teca Martínez falls into the hands of Los Marranos.
322	4	"Vicenta abandona a su familia"	18 October 2018	1.28
To protect her most precious treasure, Vicenta says goodbye to her brother and leaves with her son, fleeing from her enemies. Alberto takes a risk, to help them. La Tuti is a victim of El Teca.
323	5	"Desaparece el hijo de Vicenta"	19 October 2018	1.10
After the confrontation between Vicenta and Miguel's girlfriend, Danielito disappears without a trace. El Teca receives a heavy blow and destroys La Tuti's brothel.
324	6	"Vicenta vive ahora con Alberto"	22 October 2018	1.14
After finding Danielito, Vicenta and her son move to Alberto's house, who promises to protect them. Los Marranos and El Teca force Héctor Ruiz to agree with them.
325	7	"Vicenta y su hijo se fugan"	23 October 2018	1.05
After a surprise visit from Almeida to Alberto's house, Vicenta and the boy escape. They seek refuge, but they do not find it. Some thugs threaten them. The Acero ranch is closed.
326	8	"Ofrecen oro por Vicenta e hijo"	24 October 2018	1.11
Vicenta and Danielito's kidnappers see the video in which they offer gold, if they are delivered alive. They are going to exchange them for the reward that El Teca gives. Los Marranos look for La Tuti.
327	9	"Vicenta pacta con El Marrano"	26 October 2018	1.05
Vicenta, kidnapped, negotiates with El Marrano Mayor: with her, as a bait, they will go to El Teca to kill him and he will keep the gold. Salvador suspects that the Rancho crisis was provoked.
328	10	"Alberto va por Vicenta"	29 October 2018	1.15
An FBI operative, led by Alberto, seeks to rescue Vicenta and her son, but they face strong resistance. Salvador beats El Marrano Mayor to release information.
329	11	"La pelea de Salvador y El Teca"	30 October 2018	1.08
A fierce battle unleashes between Salvador and El Teca, in which both seek to avenge the death of one of their own. Vicenta and Danielito get a surprise.
330	12	"Los Acero torturan al Teca"	31 October 2018	1.07
El Teca falls into the hands of the Acero, who seek to collect all the suffering that has caused them. El Gallo's son is arrested.
331	13	"Alberto arriesga su carrera"	1 November 2018	1.13
Alberto falsifies a signature to remove Vicenta from the FBI's most wanted list. He approaches her, more like a man in love, than a federal agent.
332	14	"Alberto y Vicenta se disgustan"	2 November 2018	0.99
Vicenta goes to Alberto's house, to help him with the search of a heart for his boss, Almeida. El Gallo stars in one scandal after another, Felipe wants to kill him.
333	15	"Vicenta pelea con Sofía"	5 November 2018	1.05
Sofía changes the fate of Danielito, by orders of El Teca. Alberto gets a heart for Almeida's transplant. Chepina wants a divorce.
334	16	"Sofía es un cabo suelto"	7 November 2018	1.03
Alberto believes that Sofía is still a danger for Vicenta and Danielito, although El Marrano Mayor is in prison and El Teca, "dead." Leticia is in charge of catching Sofía. Aida flees.
335	17	"Surgen Los Mandrakes"	8 November 2018	1.00
Sofía prepares her attack to finish off the Acero. She has a renewed army, whose men were tattooed with Mandragora autumnalis, the plant that keeps Teca Martínez alive.
336	18	"Alberto corteja a Vicenta"	9 November 2018	1.06
For her bravery and beauty, Alberto is attracted to Vicenta and confesses it. El Marrano attacks Sofía. Salvador suffers a crisis and is hospitalized. Josefina gets a mammogram.
337	19	"La bienvenida de Sarita Acero"	12 November 2018	0.98
Aida leaves Sarita in a church. Salvador and Rosario pick up the baby and the Acero family welcomes her. Alberto and Vicenta are a couple and Danielito is excited.
338	20	"Alianza contra Los Acero"	13 November 2018	0.97
Upon awakening from the coma, El Teca Martínez proposes to ally with El Marrano Mayor, but they dispute the leadership to go against the Acero-Quintanilla. They define that the first objective will be Salvador.
339	21	"El Teca busca venganza"	14 November 2018	0.96
After torturing Azuceno, El Teca and his people cornered Salvador and his family. Vicenta and Alberto intuit that they are in Mexico and are going to rescue them, against FBI orders.
340	22	"Salvador al borde de la muerte"	15 November 2018	1.06
While Sofía and El Marrano Mayor guard Rosario, Elizabeth and Sarita Acero, El Teca is ready to kill Salvador. Alberto and Vicenta arrive to face their enemy.
341	23	"El Teca está debilitado"	16 November 2018	1.04
The fight with Salvador leaves Teca injured, one of his hands must be amputated and if he does not, he could die. Alberto is in trouble since his boss asks for a report of the operation.
342	24	"El destino golpea a Los Acero"	19 November 2018	1.25
Although there are signs of improvement, Salvador suffers a crisis and his family is very worried about him. Alberto is subjected to a harsh interrogation by his boss, for not following instructions.
343	25	"El Bruto ataca a Los Acero"	20 November 2018	1.10
El Bruto is targeting Los Acero and La Mandrágora orders to shoot them. Alberto is arrested for assaulting a superior, they take out the weapon and the plate. The last goodbye is given to Salvador.
344	26	"Vicenta se va con Danielito"	21 November 2018	1.01
Vicenta decides to move away with her son, to guarantee their safety. Los Mandrakes have an accomplice that gives them their location and Vicenta is forced to change route.
345	27	"Alberto contra El Teca"	23 November 2018	0.93
Alberto intercepts a communication from a high-tech operations center and spies on the location of El Teca Martínez to ambush him.
346	28	"Vicenta y Daniel en el paraíso"	26 November 2018	1.18
Vicenta and Danielito enjoy the Posada del Fin del Mundo. Alberto and the Acero surround Los Mandrakes. El Teca manipulates Alvarito.
347	29	"A Vicenta algo le huele mal"	27 November 2018	1.03
Juan Ramón manages the Posada del Fin del Mundo. At the same time, he has another illicit business that Vicenta is about to discover. Samantha reduces her breasts, but her baby pays the consequences.
348	30	"Alberto en la mira"	28 November 2018	1.07
Under precise instructions from the head of the FBI, Floyd, Alberto Fuentes must be eliminated and stop being a headache for El Teca. Lucas gives Vicenta a gift for Danielito.
349	31	"A Lucas le atrae Vicenta"	29 November 2018	1.08
Lucas and Vicenta enjoy a day at the beach but something happens that ruins everything. Alberto investigates who sent him to kill and shares it with Almeida.
350	32	"La Tuti enfrenta a Teca"	30 November 2018	0.94
El Teca loses patience with La Tuti and makes it clear that Alvarito is his blood, but she is not therefore, she does not have to know about his business.
351	33	"Sospechan del Teca y Floyd"	3 December 2018	0.98
Alberto infiltrates in a prison to prove the connection between Floyd and El Teca. Leticia unmasks her boss.
352	34	"Torturan a Alberto"	4 December 2018	0.97
In jail, Alberto is hanged, they take a digital fingerprint and threaten to burn him. Vicenta gives Azuceno a pill to analyze.
353	35	"Vicenta enfrenta al crimen"	5 December 2018	0.95
Vicenta threatens the leaders of the illicit business, confirming that the medicines distributed at La Posada are a deadly cocktail. Alberto steals confidential information.
354	36	"Alberto logra su objetivo"	6 December 2018	1.02
The prisoner of interest shares with Alberto all the information he needed to indict Floyd. Vicenta and Nancy are in the hands of the delinquents of the Posada. La Tuti says what she knows.
355	37	"Lucas desespera por Vicenta"	7 December 2018	1.00
After learning that Vicenta flees El Teca, Lucas senses that he is in danger and interrogates the criminals. Alberto reads Vicenta's love letter.
356	38	"Intentan atrapar a Vicenta"	10 December 2018	1.02
At the Posada, everyone knows that Vicenta is not just any tourist, so the criminals want to sell Vicenta and her son to El Teca for a high price. Felipe unmasks Ruíz.
357	39	"El Teca va por Vicenta"	11 December 2018	0.95
The men of Teca Martínez undertake the mission to destroy Vicenta Acero and her son.
358	40	"Vicenta y su hijo en peligro"	12 December 2018	1.14
Juan Ramón fears that the hostages will denounce him and before losing his freedom, he opens the gas tap to take their lives. El Teca arrives at the Posada del Fin del Mundo. Lucía calls Azuceno.
359	41	"Alberto busca a Vicenta"	13 December 2018	1.09
Azuceno, anguished at not getting an answer from the men he sent to rescue Vicenta, gives the information to Alberto and he undertakes the search. Juan Ramón becomes an ally of El Teca.
360	42	"El Teca rebautiza a su Cártel"	14 December 2018	1.07
El Teca recruits Juan Ramón, for saving his life. He marks him with the new symbol, BS, Balas y Sangre as part of the re-launch of the Tijuana cartel.
361	43	"Plan de Vicenta contra El Teca"	18 December 2018	1.05
With help from Mecha, Vicenta Acero will seek help in Arizona, where an ex-capo betrayed by El Teca is interested, like her in ending him.
362	44	"Vicenta va a la frontera"	19 December 2018	0.96
Accompanied by Mecha and Lucía, Vicenta travels to the United States to meet Arturo Landino, the capo with whom she intends to associate to kill El Teca.
363	45	"El Teca amenaza a su nieto"	20 December 2018	1.01
If Alvarito goes away again, El Teca threatens to kill La Tuti and all her girls; and even if they hide, he swears he will find them, to kill them.
364	46	"Alberto burla la seguridad"	21 December 2018	0.89
The FBI intercepts Teca's call with Floyd, but he sets a trap for them at the Palacio de Gobierno. Vicenta takes the risk when crossing the border.
365	47	"Vicenta se complica"	26 December 2018	1.04
Lucía's nerves give her away and the border agent asks too many questions and shouts to get everyone out of the vehicle. Almeida figures out Vicenta's location and gives it to Alberto.
366	48	"Creen que Alberto es un narco"	27 December 2018	0.93
Alberto arrives at the shelter to look for Vicenta and her son, but Lucas and Nancy believe that he is one of the drug traffickers who persecute her. La Tuti draws a plan with Alvarito. El Amable commissions a mission.
367	49	"Vicenta condiciona al socio"	28 December 2018	0.96
To face El Teca in this war, Vicenta Acero demands to be her, the one that establishes the rules, the strategies and the army. Alberto loses consciousness. Leticia thinks about Alberto.
368	50	"Josefina en el blanco del Teca"	1 January 2019	0.81
Now that Josefina declares her aspirations as a governor on TV, El Teca considers it a betrayal of Ruíz and plans to execute her during the electoral campaign. Alvarito must move the market.
369	51	"Alvarito ya es un narco"	2 January 2019	0.91
For the first time and with instructions from his grandfather, El Teca, Alvarito closes a deal with the drug traffickers. Vicenta resents Alberto, after she tries to apologize to Leticia.
370	52	"Amenazan a Alberto y Vicenta"	3 January 2019	0.96
Hatred and jealousy drive Leticia to the point of taking out a gun and pointing to Alberto and Vicenta. Alvarito and La Tuti bring a message to Gallo and Felipe. Ruíz swears revenge on Josefina.
371	53	"El plan de fuga de Ruíz"	4 January 2019	0.87
A riot in prison serves as a distraction to free Hector Ruíz, but the Acero's intercept with bullets the car in which the ex-governor is in. Samantha tries on Josefina's wedding dress.
372	54	"El Teca: precio a la traición"	7 January 2019	1.00
Cruel and heartless, El Teca threatens those of his blood with torture and pressures them to confess the truth. Alvarito takes out his darker side to save La Tuti.
373	55	"La Tuti ya no es seductora"	8 January 2019	0.99
La Tuti forgets the warnings of El Teca and ends chained for spying on him and selling him out to The Acero. Ruíz and Rebeca, his partner, have Danielito in their sights.
374	56	"Un regalo de bodas a Los Acero"	9 January 2019	0.93
An ambush by El Teca and his men takes the Acero family by surprise. Rebeca bribes the director of the prison, where Ruíz is. La Tuti suffers locked in a dungeon.
375	57	"Alvarito juega sucio al Teca"	10 January 2019	1.02
From El Teca's hiding place, Alvarito takes a risk for the Acero and reveals crucial information to catch his grandfather. Felipe swears revenge for the death of Samantha. Ruíz faces El Teca.
376	58	"Danielito desaparece"	11 January 2019	0.92
After Vicenta declares war on El Teca, because of Samantha's death, she looks for Danielito and can not find him anywhere. La Tuti, Alvarito and his girlfriend are locked and watched.
377	59	"Alberto al rescate de Daniel"	14 January 2019	0.98
Vicenta's son is kidnapped and Alberto, reintegrated with FBI forces, has the mission of rescuing him. Alvarito, La Tuti and Anita flee and El Teca orders to trap them.
378	60	"Ruíz chantajea al Teca"	15 January 2019	1.01
Danielito is the medal that El Teca wants to hang to get revenge on Vicenta and Ruíz, he has him in his hands. El Teca and Ruíz negotiate and someone else pays the consequences.
379	61	"El coraje de Josefina"	16 January 2019	0.93
Handcuffed, Josefina faces Teca, ready to lose her life, if necessary, but she will not give the location of the Acero. Ruíz demands the false passports and flees with Danielito.
380	62	"Chepina se entrega a la muerte"	17 January 2019	0.97
Obligated by El Teca, Josefina records a video in which she announces that the cancer has returned, but a fact raises suspicions to her family. El Gallo contacts Alberto. Danielito and Vicenta say goodbye.
381	63	"Alberto entrega a Ruíz"	18 January 2019	0.93
An armored truck serves as a transport for Ruíz to enter the protection program, but Alberto tricks him and lets the Acero take care of him. Ruíz tries to negotiate.
382	64	"El Teca cambia de escondite"	21 January 2019	0.98
Suspecting that the Acero have information that compromises his safety, El Teca changes his hiding place and takes his hostage, Josefina. She negotiates her freedom.
383	65	"El Teca exige canje"	22 January 2019	1.07
The FBI, Alberto and Vicenta go to the safe house and El Teca is no longer there, but he still negotiates with them an exchange: they get the delivery of Josefina and he gets Vicenta. She must go alone and unarmed.
384	66	"Vicenta se entrega"	23 January 2019	0.95
Almeida and Alberto guard the place of the exchange of Chepina for Vicenta, but El Bruto and Ramón take Vicenta by force. Azuceno gets his way by simulating a crime.
385	67	"El Teca sorprende al Amable"	24 January 2019	1.01
After facing gunshots at the Acero and fleeing, El Teca locates the hiding place of Amable and Danielito. He arrives and makes him pay a high price. Vicenta senses that something is wrong with her son.
386	68	"Mecha se juega la vida"	28 January 2019	1.03
Trapped by the enemy, Mecha takes courage, wields a weapon and confronts Mexico's most powerful drug lord and his henchmen to protect Vicenta's son.
387	69	"El Teca en manos de Vicenta"	29 January 2019	1.23
Vicenta Acero fights against El Teca in a battle where revenge has no limits. Mecha is arrested and Danielito flees in the middle of the desert. The Acero receive beautiful news.
