= Eduardo Amer =

Mexican actor (born 1987)

- Born: Eduardo Amer Peraza; 30 November 1987 (age 37); Merida, Yucatan, Mexico
- Occupation: Actor
- Years active: 2012–present

Eduardo Amer Peraza (born 30 November 1987 in Merida, Yucatan, Mexico) is a Mexican actor best known for his role of Bebote in the Telemundo drama series Señora Acero (2015–2018). Amer studied acting at the New York Film Academy and the Centro de Educación Artística of Televisa.

== Personal life ==
Amer was in a relationship with Venezuelan actress María José Magán since filming the series Señora Acero. In December 2021, he married his American fitness-model girlfriend, Courtney Nicole.

== Filmography ==
Television performances
Year	Title	Roles	Notes
2012–2015	La rosa de Guadalupe	Various roles	7 episodes
2014	La malquerida	Unknown role	Episodes: "Desea recuperar a Acacia" and "Cristina se reencuentra con un gran amigo"
2014	Como dice el dicho	Luis	Episode: "Ave vieja, no entra en jaula"
2015–2018	Señora Acero	Óscar "El Bebote"	Series regular (seasons 2–5); 207 episodes
2020	Esta historia me suena	Rodrigo	Episode: "La Llave"
