= Wednesdays Don't Exist =

- Spanish: Los miércoles no existen
- Directed by: Peris Romano
- Written by: Peris Romano
- Produced by: José Frade; Constantino Frade
- Starring: Eduardo Noriega; Inma Cuesta; Gorka Otxoa; Alexandra Jiménez; Andrea Duro; William Miller; María León
- Cinematography: Jon D. Domínguez
- Edited by: Raúl de Torres
- Music by: Esther Rodríguez; Alberto Matesanz
- Production companies: José Frade PC; Garra Producciones
- Distributed by: eOne Films Spain
- Release date: 16 October 2015 (Spain)
- Countries: Spain; Venezuela
- Language: Spanish

Wednesdays Don't Exist (Spanish: Los miércoles no existen) is a 2015 Spanish-Venezuelan romantic musical comedy-drama film written and directed by Peris Romano which stars Eduardo Noriega, Inma Cuesta, Gorka Otxoa, Alexandra Jiménez, Andrea Duro, and William Miller alongside María León.

== Plot ==
Set in Madrid from 2010 to 2014, the plot follows the romantic tribulations and pursuits of a group of thirty-somethings.

== Cast ==
- Eduardo Noriega as Pablo
- Inma Cuesta as Mara
- Gorka Otxoa as César
- Alexandra Jiménez as Irene
- Andrea Duro as Paula
- William Miller as Hugo
- María León as Patricia

== Production ==
Originally conceived as a film screenplay, the script first took instead the form of a stage play after it did not find a producer. Upon the play's success, the script became a feature film, featuring returning actors William Miller and Gorka Otxoa. The film is a Spanish-Venezuelan co-production by José Frade PC and Garra Producciones, and it had the participation of TVE and Movistar+. It was shot in Madrid in late 2014.

== Release ==
Distributed by eOne Films Spain, the film was released theatrically in Spain on 16 October 2015.

== Reception ==
Javier Ocaña of El País assessed that Romano's "elegant mise-en-scène" and his proven ability to compose sentimental dilemmas "full of humor", lead the film to a "general sympathy", unevenness of the situations notwithstanding.

Andrea G. Bermejo of Cinemanía rated Wednesdays Don't Exist—"a film about relations following the likes of Closer, In the City and The Other Side of the Bed"—3 out of 5 stars, pointing out that it is not a comedy even if the trailer pretends to convince viewers otherwise.

== See also ==
- List of Spanish films of 2015
