= Señora Acero season 4 =

Señora Acero
- Season 4
- Señora Acero season four poster
- Starring: Carolina Miranda; Luis Ernesto Franco; Ana Lucía Domínguez; Diego Cadavid; Jorge Zárate; Gaby Espino
- No. of episodes: 77

Release
- Original network: Telemundo
- Original release: 6 November 2017 – 20 February 2018

Season chronology
- Next → Season 5

The fourth season of the American television series Señora Acero also known as Señora Acero: La Coyote, written by Indira Páez based on an original story by Roberto Stopello, revolves around Vicenta Acero, a coyote woman who fights against the Mexican government and the United States Border Patrol for helping to cross immigrants on the border and make them fulfill their American dream. She, her brother, and her boyfriend managed to unmask the Mexican government and continue to work in the business of helping immigrants cross the border.

The season stars Carolina Miranda as Vicenta Acero, Luis Ernesto Franco as Daniel Philips, Ana Lucía Domínguez as La Tuti, Diego Cadavid as Señor Romero, and Jorge Zárate as El Indio Amaro, with the special participation of Gaby Espino as Indira Cárdenas.

The fourth season began airing on 6 November 2017, on Telemundo, and concluded on 20 February 2018.

The season has as its main axis, illegal immigration, the inclusion of Julián Romero, a new enemy of Los Acero, and the life of Indira Cárdenas as a mother.

== Plot ==
Vicenta Acero (Carolina Miranda) and Daniel Phillips (Luis Ernesto Franco) swore an eternal love after ending Chucho Casáres (Sergio Goyri) in the middle of the desert, but they know that destiny is not on their side. Both the government of Mexico and the United States are against the Acero family, since they are responsible for the death of the governor of Chihuahua, Chucho Casáres. Obliged to go underground, Vicenta and Daniel decide to move to Matamoros, Tamaulipas. Now they have more enemies than ever. Indira Cárdenas (Gaby Espino), who she is now the head of the Department of Homeland Security and Border Patrol of Texas, continues to be the biggest hurdle for Vicenta and Daniel. El Indio Amaro (Jorge Zárate), without money and power, blackmails Indira to allow him to pass drugs across the border and rebuild his cartel. But Vicenta and Daniel intercept the cargo, leaving El Indio ruined and vowing to take revenge on them. As if that were not enough, a new enemy appears, the Colombian known as Mr. Romero. Mr. Romero is in fact Julián Montero (Diego Cadavid), son of Briceida Montero and nephew of Rodrigo Montero, and has come to Mexico to avenge the death of his family. Mr. Romero joins forces with all the enemies of Los Acero to get what he wants, forming a team first with El Indio Amaro and then with Tuti. La Tuti (Ana Lucía Domínguez), anxious for revenge against El Indio, has been attracting her clients to her own organization, "The Havana Cartel", also known as "The Mamacitas Cartel", led by a clan of beautiful women.

Salvador Acero (Michel Duval) is still in love with his wife, Rosario (Oka Giner), and continues to work with Vicenta and Daniel in the business of helping immigrants cross the border. El Gallo (Óscar Priego), aware of the corrupt plans in which the Mexican President (Mario Loría), Chucho's boss has been implicated, blackmails him into leaving his family in peace. And then he decides to launch his own political career, becoming the mayor of Matamoros. Now with power, El Gallo can now manipulate the chains of power for the benefit of the Acero family. For his part Romero becomes obsessed with Vicenta, to the point of send it her to kidnap. El Gallo recruits Daniel and Salvador on a rescue mission that causes many deaths. Once again, the blood and revenge follow Vicenta Acero, who, despite her pain, will continue to do justice along the border as La Coyote.

== Cast and characters ==
From left to right. Jorge Zárate as El Indio Amaro, Carolina Miranda as Vicenta Acero, Diego Cadavid as Señor Romero, and Gaby Espino as Indira Cárdenas.

=== Main characters ===
- Carolina Miranda as Vicenta Acero / La Coyote: She is a coyote that is dedicated to crossing migrants on the border, half-sister of Salvador Acero, and girlfriend of Daniel Phillips. After assassinating Chucho Casáres, Vicenta and her family were wanted by the corrupted Mexican government because of the death of Chucho Casáres.
- Luis Ernesto Franco as Daniel Phillips: He is an immigration police officer, boyfriend of Vicenta, and son of Victoria Phillips. He works with Los Aceros crossing immigrants on the border. After helping Indira to rescue her son, his charges with justice are lifted and he returns to Department of National Security after of Indira's dimismissal by the death of Officer Sánchez.
- Ana Lucía Domínguez as Marta Mónica Villalobos / La Tuti, after having inherited all of Carlos Delgado's money, La Tuti teamed up with El Roscas to destroy El Indio Amaro due to wanting her revenge for him making her believe her son Álvaro was dead. She, Marcelo, and El Roscas create the de la Habana cartel.
- Diego Cadavid as Julián Martínez Montero, better known as Señor Romero or Julián Romero, is a Colombian drug lord and leader of the Cali cartel, later the new leader of the Tijuana cartel who turns out is the son of Briceida Montero and Teca Martínez. While arriving in Mexico to avenge the death of his mother, his biological father, his half-brother and family, he is poses as a human rights lawyer who begins to form an obsession and vendetta over Vicenta in order to destroy the Acero-Quintanilla clan.
- Jorge Zárate as El Indio Amaro is the main enemy of Los Aceros. With the help of Indira and the president of Mexico, he raises the Tijuana cartel again. Finally, he is executed and mortally crashed with a rock by Gallo Quintanilla and the Acero brothers.
- Gaby Espino as Índira Cárdenas, who is the corrupted head of the Department of National Security. She is Nicolás's mother and Jorge's ex-wife. She works for El Indio Amaro and fights to have custody of his son and is later dismissed from her position for the murder of Officer Arturo Sánchez. Dies in the explosión.

=== Recurring characters ===
- Michel Duval as Salvador Acero, he is the half-brother of Vicenta, and Rosario's boyfriend. Together with his sister they cross migrants on the border of Mexico.
- Mauricio Henao as José Ángel Godoy / Pepote, After Salvador castrated him and was left dead. José Ángel is rescued by El Indio Amaro and Mario Casas and is forced to work for them. Finally he dies in the explosion in the cabin caused by himself.
- Alberto Agnesi as Marcelo Dóriga. After Aracely's death, Marcelo prevents Mario from keeping custody of Elizabeth. Marcelo joins forces with La Tuti and El Rosca and create the de la Habana cartel and he die together with Mario during their final confrontation.
- Rodrigo Guirao as Mario Casas, is a pharmacist and scientific engineer, who tries to destroy the life of Marcelo, father of Elizabeth and boyfriend of Andrea. In this season it is revealed that Mario suffers from obsession with Aracely, even after her death and he die together with Marcelo during their final confrontation.
- Óscar Priego as Erick Quintanilla / El Gallo, after fleeing for a long time from the police and the Mexican government, he manages to find evidence to incriminate the president of Mexico Heriberto Roca and becomes the Municipal President of Matamoros.
- Jonathan Islas as Tecolote, he is a cold-blooded murderer who starts working for El Indio Amaro on the recommendation of Indira.
- Aurora Gil as Josefina Aguilar, she is the only survivor of the surname Aguilar, wife of Erick and mother of Belinda, daughter that he had with Larry.
- Oka Giner as Rosario Franco, she is Salvador's girlfriend, and Aida's sister.
- Shalim Ortiz as Arturo Sánchez, he is a migration officer who helps Daniel and Vicenta in everything she can, and tries to find incriminating evidence against Indira Cárdenas, but dies getting multiple shots by El Tecolote from behind during a confrontation with El Indio.
- Alberto Casanova as Jorge Araujo, he is the ex-husband of Indira and father of Nicolás.
- Nubia Martí as Victoria Phillips, is the mother of Daniel, who suffers from Alzheimer's.
- María José Magán as Andrea Dóriga Díaz, is the girlfriend of Mario and daughter of Marcelo and later commits suicide.
- León Peraza as Domingo, he is Mario's accomplice in all his criminal acts and later dies in the explosion caused by Mario Casas.
- Mario Loría as Heriberto Roca / El Presidente Matón, he is the former corrupted and thug President of México and Boss of the murdered corrupted and thug Governor of Chihuahua Chucho Casares, later arrested along with Triple R and dismissed from his position for acts of corruption, connections, torture and business with the Tijuana Cartel and Juárez Cartel and the murder of corrupted former Procurator of PGE Eladio Puertas and later dies poisoned by Julian Romero in the Federal prison.
- Haydeé Navarra as Ximena Ladrón de Guevara, is the ex-wife of Marcelo and Acacio, mother of Andrea and Alvaro, and grandmother of Alvaro II.
- Felipe Betancourt as Azuceno, is one of the security men of Julián.
- Alicia Jaziz as Carmen Placiencia, she is an immigrant, who Indira kidnaps to work with El Indio, and befriends José Ángel and Nicolás. However, as the series progresses, her and José Angel begin to have a mutual attraction towards each other. Later dies after of trying to escape with Pepito.
- Jessica Segura as Aída Franco, sister of Rosario.
- Benjamín Rivero as Raúl Ricardo Rondón / Triple R, is a political adviser for El Gallo later betrays him, later arrested along with corrupted president and later executed by Julian's men.
- Mario Escalante as Pancho Panteón, is one of the security men of Los Acero and later dies in the explosión by Mario.
- Lucía Silva as Débora Cañizales, mother of Miguel Quintanilla, lover of El Gallo and later killed by a fatal shot by El Roscas by Julian's order.
- Katia del Pino as Lili Valdés, is a prostitute, who joins the La Tuti cartel. Later killed by a fatal shot by El Tecolote by the Indio's order.
- Eduardo Amer as Bebote, is one of the security men of Los Acero.
- Roberto Wohlmuth as El Roscas, After betraying El Indio Amaro, which costed him his wife. He starts working for La Tuti and Julian Romero. Responsible for the murder of Deborah and Begoña. Finally killed by Salvador Acero.
- Lourdes Reyes as Cayetana Acosta, is the former wife of the deceased corrupted president of Mexico Heriberto Roca.
- Fermín Martínez as Ramiro Núñez / El Jaibo, is a prisoner who helps Salvador return to the world of money laundering and later killed by Julian's men
- Nikolás Caballero as Nicolás Araujo / El Tiburón 2, son of Indira and Jorge. He ends up being kidnapped by El Indio, at first taken as a hostage. Then fakes Nikolás’ murder, by psychologically breaking him into becoming a “second son” and heir to the Cartel of Tijuana, for El Indio.
- Jesús Castro as Ernesto Aristimuño, he is a former journalist, who helps Los Acero destroy the president.
- Tomás Rojas as Eladio Puertas, former Corrupted Procurator of the PGE. He was arrested after he was order to take Vicenta to an unknown location to kill her and dismissed from his position and executed by Corrupted President's order.
- Martijn Kuiper as Gregory Jones, is the owner of the farm in Falfurrias, Texas, where Rosario's sister lives and works. However, Gregory and Aida, secretly have an affair together.
- Javier Escobar as Officer Sergio Mendoza, After Eladio Puertas was arrested and was ordered to be executed, the corrupted president named him Procurator of the PGE. Who helps the Acero brothers in the rebellion to incriminating evidence against of the president of the republic Heriberto Roca.
- Sandra Quiróz as Laura Jones, Gregory's wife.
- Paty Pacheco as Yanisei Vega, is a prostitute, who joins the La Tuti cartel.
- María Fernanda Quiroz as Frida Cuevas, she is a lawyer and ex girlfriend of Daniel and later arrested for incriminating evidence against Gregory without consent and also for attempting to evade justice.
- Gibrán Cantú as Fiambré, he is one of Romero's security men.
- Yasmary Delgado as Lázara, better known as La Glu Glu, she is a transgender woman who works for La Tuti.

== Episodes ==
No. overall	No. in season	Title	Original release date	US viewers (millions)
242	1	"Los Acero en la clandestinidad"	6 November 2017	1.77
Six months before, between the border of Mexico and the United States, Vicenta and Daniel return to this place to deliver the coordinates of the place where Chucho's body is buried and Daniel takes this moment to tell Vicenta that he will find El Indio Amaro and, he will pay for all the damage he has done. Meanwhile, El Indio learns that Vicenta and Daniel were the people who took Casáres away; so he asks his men to take charge of finding Los Acero and Salvador asks Josefina to go with the rest of the family to another house as El Indio will take revenge at any time for the death of his partner. Salvador and El Gallo take care that Domingo tells them how Mario Casas managed to find the location of his house.
243	2	"Prófugos de la justicia"	7 November 2017	1.54
After confronting some men at the border, Vicenta and Daniel are in charge of protecting the children of the couple who died at the hands of assailants; but before removing them from the place where they were, they are stopped by a man from Los Petates group. El Indio receives news that many of his men died after the clash they had with Los Acero. The President learns that Mendoza managed to find the body of Chucho Casáres in the middle of the desert and the President informs the police that he will give some statements in which he will inform that Los Acero-Quintanilla are responsible for the death of the governor. El Gallo asks Pancho if they can really be safe where they are since the lives of their family members are in danger.
244	3	"Todo por la familia"	8 November 2017	1.51
After the confrontation that they had with the Police, Salvador and Marcelo do not run with luck and are retained by the police; Vicenta and Daniel after reading the letter that the mother left to the children they rescued. They are responsible for passing the children to the other side of the border. Daniel is surprised to see that Indira managed to find him. El Indio asks one of his best men to take charge of destroying Los Acero and Mendoza talks to Salvador and Marcelo to tell them that they will be in a more secure cell; since he does not want their lives to be in danger. Sánchez asks Indira to comply with his deal and not take Daniel as prisoner. Salvador tells Mendoza that he was responsible for the death of Chucho Casáres and for this he wants them to stop persecuting the rest of the family. El Gallo confirms to Vicenta that his brother and Marcelo were arrested by the police.
245	4	"Pruebas incriminatorias"	9 November 2017	1.37
After talking with Daniel; Indira agrees to release him. The men of El Indio are responsible for removing him from the country without raising any suspicion and Vicenta is ensures that his family is not in danger. Upon arriving in Colombia, La Tuti and El Roscas meet Mr. Romero. Gallo tells Bebote that he prefers to be dead before paying jail. Meanwhile, Sanchez helps Vicenta and her family cross the border. After listening to La Tuti, Romero tells him that he does not believe anything of what he is saying. Nicolás asks his mother to leave his job so that they can give him custody and live with him. Meanwhile, Daniel decides to help Vicenta, his mother and the rest of the family before the police realize they are Los Acero.
246	5	"El presidente contra Salvador"	10 November 2017	1.46
Upon arriving in Colombia, El Indio Amaro meets with Mr. Romero as he wants to propose new alliances so that he can transport the drug's without any problem. Vicenta tells Sánchez that she will cross the border again; since he must meet with El Gallo to find a way to get Salvador out of jail. El Roscas is hit by Romero's men after realizing that he was hanging around the ranch. The President asks his employees to talk to Ernesto as they must find the documents that this journalist has on the former governor. Salvador asks Marcelo not to repeat the story of his daughter with Elizabeth and to think things through. Vicenta, El Gallo and Daniel read the documents about the President's alliance with Governor Casáres and El Indio Amaro. Mendoza informs Salvador that he will be transferred to the maximum security prison after confessing that he was the person who killed Chucho Casáres.
247	6	"Momento de la verdad"	13 November 2017	1.58
After being helped by Mendoza, Vicenta manages to escape safely from jail; now Salvador is guarded by six anti-riot trucks to be transferred to the maximum security prison; according to the instructions of the President. While, Mario is in charge of looking for his daughter Elizabeth. The President informs the Mexicans that Salvador has been transferred to the jail of maximum security since his commitment is to put an end to the drug trafficking that is ravaging the entire nation. Indira looks for her son; after the discussion they had. After the conversation with Mario, Josefina has no choice but to give Mario to her daughter. Before starting with the plan to rescue Salvador, Daniel asks Vicenta not to be separated from him.
248	7	"Vicenta y Phillips acorralados"	14 November 2017	1.63
Mendoza speaks with Marcelo to tell him that his relatives tried to attack the president. Salvador can not take the pressure anymore and decides to confront the other inmates. After being discovered, by the agents, Vicenta and Daniel take drastic measures to flee from them. After the fight Salvador suffers an attack and one of the inmates asks the guard to take him to his cell. Andrea communicates with her mother to tell her that she is doing everything possible to escape from Mario. El Indio tells Indira the new route he has to open so that the merchandise can pass and Tuti tells Roscas that he is afraid of traveling with the drug inside his body. The President asks his trusted man to comply with his order.
249	8	"Presidente torturador"	15 November 2017	1.47
Seeing Andrea's attitude, Domingo tells her that they will leave the park as soon as possible. Meanwhile, Mr. Romero learns that the man they had in jail to kill Salvador died; since Ramiro Núñez is in charge of the protection of Salvador. After being detained for a few hours, Vicenta realizes that she was arrested by the President himself. El Indio tells his men that they will continue with the plan; since he can not lose the alliance they made with Romero. Meanwhile Vicenta tells the President that she was the only person who killed Chucho Casáres and wants to know what happened with Daniel. Debora believes that it is time for the family to separate since everyone is in danger of death and Josefina tells the others that in order to recover Vicenta they must attack the president by going against his ex-wife.
250	9	"La Coyote no suelta prenda"	16 November 2017	1.42
Ramiro tells Salvador that his sister is missing after facing the President. El Gallo asks Daniel to recover as soon as possible since they must find Vicenta and also tells him that they are going to pressure the president with his ex-wife. Indira thanks her son for sharing some of her time with her. La Tuti learns that they will do an endoscopy, to get the drug that is left in her body. Jaibo tells Salvador that his sister was arrested by the president; although she still does not know where she is being detained. Ximena tells Marcelo that they must help their daughter since she is in danger of death if she stays with Mario.
251	10	"Como gato a su presa"	17 November 2017	1.51
After his meeting with the President, Mr. Romero appears with Vicenta because he wants to tell him that he will be his lawyer. Jaibo tells Salvador that it is better to continue with money laundering since this is more profitable than passing people across the border. El Indio communicates with Indira to see if he has people ready for him since the waiting time is ending; or else your child will pay the consequences. Mario tells his friend what they are going to do with El Indio after he knows his product and later; This man finds out that someone found out in a laboratory about the medicine he uses. La Tuti asks her friends to celebrate her first trip as a narco-trafficker with her and Rosario shows El Gallo the message his wife left him.
252	11	"Intercambio sangriento"	20 November 2017	1.65
After speaking with Romero, Vicenta communicates with Daniel to tell her that she was not kidnapped; but she is in a military garrison and also tells him that she has a lawyer who is part of a humanitarian organization. Indira communicates with El Indio to tell her that she has the people he asked for ready and Romero tells Vicenta that she will be transferred to a prison until they can clarify the death of the governor. Debora discovers that she can not work at the place where Rosario's sister works, and El Gallo, Daniel and Josefina prepare the First Lady to enter the Pines. Salvador communicates with his wife to ask him to rethink his life and forget him. El Indio Amaro gives Indira a lesson for breaking his side of the bargain.
253	12	"Pacto o escándalo"	21 November 2017	1.45
When he is cornered by El Gallo and his ex-wife, the president takes drastic measures; since he is not willing to let the nation know about his illicit businesses and the alliances he has made. Vicenta realizes that her lawyer is apparently a good person. La Tuti meets Mario and Marcelo tells Roscas that she expects her friend to do things well or else she will not be able to know about her daughters. For its part, Indira is responsible for making a well to leave there all the bodies killed by the men of El Indio and Vicenta learns that it will be part of the group of missing persons in Mexico. Jaibo asks Salvador if he thought about the job he proposed and Daniel asks El Gallo not to give up until the President tells him where Vicenta is being held.
254	13	"Vicenta, a punto de morir"	22 November 2017	1.57
After being she is captured by Elario Puerta. Elario tells Vicenta him to choose which grave he wants to die in; but just at that moment the authorities arrive to arrest him and Vicenta learns that he will remain at the disposal of the Mexican Navy. President Roca meets with his cabinet to tell them that he now has to hold a press conference to say that the Procurator told him lies about Governor Casáres and that he will be taken to jail. Meanwhile Mario asks his men not to lose sight of La Tuti and José Ángel is punished after he prevented El Indio from hitting the children he retained by force. Indira speaks with El Indio to return her son. Salvador sends two men to look for Rosario.
255	14	"La astucia de Romero"	23 November 2017	1.03
After getting the President to stop persecuting his family, El Gallo tells Josefina that they will move to Tamaulipa; They must also take care of finding Debora so that she and her son do not continue to be in danger. The authorities arrive at the Tuti's house and ask him to come out with his hands up. Marcelo receives a message from Mario where he tells him that he helped him out of prison so he can see with his own eyes how happy he is with his daughters. Upon arriving in Tamaulipa Rosario tells El Gallo where he got the money to buy that luxurious property and El Indio questions Romero if he is doing business with other men. Daniel asks Vicenta if it does not seem strange for Romero to help her get free without the President knowing.
256	15	"Peligrosa recompensa"	24 November 2017	1.35
Because Salvador did not comply with the part of his deal, Jaibo tells him that he will not give more opportunities and now he must show that he is loyal or his life will be in danger. Roscas and Marcelo are in charge of persecuting Domingo and La Tuti discovers that if she hides information to the authorities, she will be extradited to the United States where she will receive the death penalty. When he realizes that Laura is treating his employees badly, Greg asks him not to disrespect them. Vicenta calls Romero to ask if she is doing business with the Indio or with the President and Romero asks Vicenta to believe that she is on her side. Jorge tells Indira that he is ruining, since he is fighting with all the people who want to help them discover where Nicolás is.
257	16	"Sexo a la fuerza"	27 November 2017	1.53
Daniel tells Vicenta that he feels bad for not being able to help; but she tells him that she is happy to be in Matamoros since this is a very important place to help the immigrants. Marcelo asks La Tuti to give him information about the person with whom he is doing business or else he can not do anything for her. Romero learns that Tuti passed his test without suspecting anything. Later, Vicenta calls Romero to be seen she is in the white flag headquarters of Tamaulipas, and when listening to her boss, Azuceno thinks that she can leave aside the plans she has with her and her family. After extracting information from Domingo, Marcelo seeks Mario to return his she daughters and El Indio asks Indira to undress or else they will not talk about Nicolás' rescue.
258	17	"El punto débil de Indira"	28 November 2017	1.64
After a tense conversation with Daniel, Romero asks Azuceno to take charge of finding out everything about Daniel's life. Upon learning that Salvador left the jail, Romero asks his he men to take charge of the two planned attacks at the same time. For her part, Indira observes the video that El Indio sent her is about son and after talking with his wife, Daniel agrees to communicate with Indira. Andrea is impressed after shooting someone. Domingo asks Marcelo to stop torturing him because he can not take it anymore; but Marcelo tells him that he must first tell him what Mario did to his daughter because she does not recognize him. When knowing what happened to Nicolás, Daniel tells Indira to help her find him but it must be with a special condition.
259	18	"El Gallo en problemas"	29 November 2017	1.24
After learning that the plans he had against Los Acero ruined, Romero tells Tuti that he must comply with some requirements so he can take revenge on El Indio. Vicenta tells her family that they were able to corroborate Romero's data and now they are sure he was not behind the attack they were made. Daniel asks Indira what he did to El Indio to kidnap his son since both he and Sanchez know the business he has with this man. Mario asks his employees to accompany him to a private party he will do. After listening to Gallo's conversation, Salvador asks him what problem he put them all back in, and Rosario tells Vicenta that he knows how they can find Debora's whereabouts.
260	19	"Rescate en marcha"	30 November 2017	1.53
When meeting with Jaibo's partner, Salvador suggests asking him about all the places he can use to cross the border; without being discovered. La Tuti gathers her family to tell them that they must sell the house and leave this place as quickly as possible; She has very important business to do in Tamaulipas. Daniel asks Indira to calm down because El Indio should not suspect the plan they are going to carry out. El Tecolote tells his boss that he has Salvador Acero in sight and that he will not rest until he is murdered. Upon reaching the border, Vicenta asks Rosario to calm down so the police do not suspect and Azuceno gives his boss all the information he can get from Daniel Phillips. Domingo meets Marcelo to tell him that the son Andrea is waiting for is not Mario's.
261	20	"Favor con amor se paga"	1 December 2017	1.33
Vicenta communicates with Romero to ask him to help her get Rosario out of a judicial problem. After helping her, Romero tells Rosario that she must stay in the United States since she must wait for a subpoena from the court. After making Indira believe that his son was dead, El Indio laughs at this situation and Gallo and Savador ask the chief of the Petates to give them a wait to collect the money they lent them. Indira communicates with Daniel to tell him to accompany them to rescue their son. José Ángel asks Nicolás because he is not yet at his parents' side. When knowing that the son that Andrea waits for is not Mario's, Marcelo asks Domingo to tell him who the father is. Vicenta thanks Romero for helping her and also wants to know how much money she owes him.
262	21	"Indira desespera"	4 December 2017	1.41
After the kiss that I steal from Vicenta, Romero asks for an apology. On the other hand, Daniel asks Nicolás not to separate from him; While facing El Indio Armaro and his men, Indira calls Mendoza to find out how they are doing with the operation. Rosario and Debora tell Romero that he ran with luck that there were children when he dared to kiss Vicenta because otherwise she would have hit him and in the middle of the shooting, José Ángel takes care of going by Nicolás to be able to leave this place. Domingo looks for Bernarda to tell her that the pills she is giving to Andrea and her baby are the ones that are hurting her. Meanwhile Mario shows one of the scientists the synthetic drug that he created and with which he hopes to control the entire market and become a millionaire.
263	22	"Padres desconsolados"	5 December 2017	1.42
El Indio communicates with Indira to tell him that he will not continue to waste time and that his son will pay the consequences; After listening to him, Indira enters in a state of shock and Daniel looks for a way for this woman to calm down; because he is sure that El Indio has not done anything to Nicolás. For her part, Victoria asks Vicenta because everyone abandons them and Josefina asks Gallo to tell her what is consuming him in recent days. Tecolote advises his boss to get another partner because Romero does not give him confidence; He also wants to know what they are going to do with Indira's son. When Tamaulipas arrives, La Tuti does not feel satisfied with her new house since it does not compare to the mansion she had. When meeting with El Indio, Romero asks him what happened with the four million dollars that I give send.
264	23	"Locura desenfrenada"	6 December 2017	1.39
Seeing the shirt that they sent from his son to Indira, Jorge tells him that what happened to him is his fault; and for this he will pay them; for he made a great mistake by choosing her as the mother of his only son. For his part, one of the employees of El Indio is responsible for curing the wound of Nicolás and while he cures his wound he tells him that the only person who owes obedience and respect is to El Indio, because he wants him to take the place of his son. After the discussion with her ex-husband, Indira prepares a farewell to her son and in the middle of this homage Daniel and Vicenta tell Indira that they regret the death of their son. Mario tells El Indio that he should not worry about the money he gave him because as new partners they are going to make millions of dollars in a few days. El Gallo gathers his family and his close associates to make public his launching as candidate for the Municipal Presidency of Matamoros.
265	24	"La pesadilla de los Acero"	7 December 2017	1.24
After observing the men who cornered her husband, Josefina asks if they were sent by El Indio Amaro; but El Gallo tells them that these men are people who do not want him to be the new municipal president of Matamoros since they are from the opposition political party. After this fact, Salvador tells Gallo that he would be responsible for solving this problem with the help of Jaibo, since no one can know about the debt they have. For his part, José Ángel asks Mario to help Nicolás escape from El Indio, because he made his parents believe he was dead. Daniel gathers his mother and his wife to show them that they officially restored his position in the Department of Homeland Security; but his mother asks him not to accept this offer since his father is died defending justice. Josefina prepares her husband so that the people of Matamoros trust him.
266	25	"Vicenta en bandeja de plata"	8 December 2017	1.11
Vicenta gathers a group of immigrants to cross the border, but tells her that the plans to cross in a car changed and that now they will go on foot; but in the middle of this meeting; Marcelo calls Vicenta to tell him that he is back with his daughters and now wants to thank him for helping them cross the border. Seeing the intentions of Nicolás, José Ángel asks his friend not to be manipulated by the men of El Indio and think again about his family. On the other hand, Azuceno asks Roscas to be careful with what his patroness can say, since everyone should think that she is the queen of the business and Romero asks La Tuti if he could obtain information from El Gallo. Debora surprises her husband as she managed to get a good contact so that he can help him in the municipal candidacy surveys to rise in level.
267	26	"Superhéroes que no engañan"	11 December 2017	1.19
After the unexpected arrival of Los Petates to the place where Vicenta was; Romero faces one of them to save Vicenta's life; but she this one asks the head of the band to take her to her and leave the others alone. For her part, José Ángel feels very nervous when he realizes that in the same bank where he is, Salvador is. Daniel arrives at the warehouse where Vicenta is after suspecting that something could have happened to him. When faced with Mario, Marcelo tells him that since he was in prison he persecuted him and knew of the alliances he was doing with Domingo and his she employee. Like the new Tiburónn; Nicolás makes respect his she friend and saves her from being raped by one of El Indio men. Jorge tells Indira that for him the case of his son is not closed.
268	27	"Narcos enardecidos"	12 December 2017	1.38
When meeting with Romero, El Indio tells him that he decided to put aside the business they had together and also wants to tell him that if he finds to Los Acero first he will take revenge on them. For her part, Vicenta realizes that Rosario is in a shock state because she thinks she is going to lose the baby she is waiting for; because of a bleeding he has. José Ángel tells Carmen that El Indio Amaro promoted him and now he will be in charge of keeping accounts of his business. After listening to El Indio Amaro, Romero tells him that he has a contrary proposal to make if he wants to end his alliance. La Tuti meets El Gallo.
269	28	"Indira bajo sospecha"	13 December 2017	1.35
Daniel looks for Marcelo to tell him that all the security agencies have red alert for the complaint they made about the kidnapping of Elizabeth. Andrea asks Vicenta and her family how they can be so safe living in a bunker. Aida learns that she must leave the ranch after Laura learned of her relationship with her husband. Daniel's mother asks her son not to go to work because he knows that his friend had a very serious problem. Josefina and Debora ask her husband where the night passed; after leaving the event. Romero asks Tuti what information he got out of El Gallo and he also tells him that he will have to cross the border again. Mario begins to despair when he does not hear from Andrea and his daughter; while Marcelo is responsible for following all his steps so that his daughters do not take more risks.
270	29	"Vicenta enfrenta a Los Petates"	14 December 2017	1.32
After listening to a conversation from his brother; Vicenta asks Salvador to tell him the truth about who they borrowed money from, and when Vicenta discovers that they owed money to Los Petates, Vicenta tells them that she will meet with these men to clarify who they are Los Acero. After being stopped by the police; Aida's lover tells him that he will take care of this problem. Nicolás is upset by a push that one of his men gave him; while they played. By listening to the plans your sister has; Salvador tells him that he does not agree with this; since his life would be in danger. Daniel tells Indira to tell him what his friend discovered so that El Indio killed him; but when he looks carefully at the body in Sanchez's car, Daniel tells his group that he is sure that this is not his body.
271	30	"El negocio redondo de Salvador"	15 December 2017	1.16
After knowing the intentions of the head of the Petates; Vicenta tells him that with his people he is not going to get involved; but in the middle of this clandestine meeting; Two policemen arrive at this site to know what is happening there and Vicenta and Salvador are witnesses that this group has on its side the police. Daniel tells his colleague that he still does not believe that Sánchez has anything to do with drug trafficking since the information he found on his computer belongs to the businesses that Indira is doing with El Indio. La Tuti tells the man with whom she is negotiating to have mercy on them; since they only brought with them the merchandise that Romero sent him. El Gallo asks one of his men to take charge of redoubling his security because the man who is helping him in the campaign told him that he can not take his family to his events; because everyone would be in danger.
272	31	"Reclutado por el Cártel"	18 December 2017	1.28
When she found out that her brother was once again laundering money, Vicenta tells him that she will not help him in this business since this job is much worse than being a coyote; but Salvador tells him that thanks to this business he owes everything he has achieved and for this he will continue to be part of this; and in the middle of this conversation Vicenta receives a call from Aida who implores her help so that her son will not be taken away. Azuceno tells his boss that he must change his strategy and reward to El Indio Amaro so that he does not distrust him and can carry out his purposes. Upon finding Carmen wounded, Tecolote looks for ways to get her out of the tunnel as soon as possible and El Gallo makes it clear to Triple R that he respects his two women and therefore does not hide them from the rest of the people. José Ángel communicates with Mario to ask him to help him out of the house of El Indio before it is too late.
273	32	"Otro enemigo para los Acero"	19 December 2017	1.19
274	33	"Domingo se la juega"	20 December 2017	1.24
Vicenta asks Daniel why Mario Casas is involved with the son of Indira, For his part, Nicolas looks for Carmen and José Ángel to ask for an apology for all the things he has done since if he does not comply with what El Indio Amaro orders him his parents would be in danger. After finding Romero lying on the floor, Tuti tells Azuceno that he will take care of him because he will not let him consume more drugs. While listening to the conversation between Domingo and Mario, Debora feels scared that this man betrays them and Mario accepts Domingo's proposal. El Gallo asks Domingo to tell them what he is hiding from his past. After the attack in which he was involved, Salvador gathers his family to tell them about this situation as they must now look for who is behind all this.
275	34	"Mente asesina"	21 December 2017	1.22
After receiving a call from Vicenta, Romero decides to go and help her by paying Aida's bail before it is his trial. For his part, El Indio Amaro along with his men take the people who are going to cross the tunnels and in the middle of their journey Amaro tells Nicolás that will give him more confidence. When arriving at the tunnels, El Indio warns his people that for no reason they can lose the merchandise or otherwise they will pay the consequences. Meanwhile, Mario tells Domingo that he does not believe anything of what he is saying. Debora tells Josefina that she knows the whole truth about Felipito; because she knows that this son is not biologically his. Salvador asks his wife to avoid exposing herself because she does not want her life or her son's life to be in danger.
276	35	"Mala espina"	22 December 2017	1.26
After being helped by Romero, Aida tells Vicenta that she noticed that Daniel is very jealous of this man. In the middle of a discussion, Andrea claims Salvador for killing his brother a long time ago. For his part, El Indio Amaro asks for calm to his men while the Petates are in this place and, when they leave the tunnel, Nicolás receives a very unpleasant surprise. Daniel tells his wife that he does not agree with Romero in everything because he does not trust him. Josefina looks for Felipito again because she wants to answer all the questions she has to ask after discovering that she is not her biological mother.
277	36	"Un ejército al rescate"	25 December 2017	0.92
Daniel proposes to his friends to go and look for Marcelo and the others because he is very worried about not having any news of them; but after a long time, Vicenta manages to communicate with Marcelo and he tells him that the plans against Mario and El Indio were totally damaged. Meanwhile, La Tuti tells El Gallo that he has prepared some very special surprises to help him in his campaign for the Matamoros Presidency. Romero goes to the house of El Indio to personally deliver some details in order to erase the problems they have had and continue working without any problem. When he meets his daughter again, Marcelo asks her to tell him what happened between her and Domingo.
278	37	"A balazo limpio"	26 December 2017	1.20
When confirming that Nicolás is still alive, Daniel and his people are responsible for mounting an operation to rescue him; but in the middle of this operation, Nicolás tells Carmen that the woman who is calling him is not his mother but a police officer; which can arrest them. After telling El Indio that he is the son of Briceida Montero, Romero tells El Indio that there is not a day when he does not think about her and also asks him that nobody should find out the truth or if not the plans to finish with Los Acero would be finished. On the other hand, Tuti is responsible for advertising El Gallo. Remembering the woman I love the most, Mario thinks it is time to take revenge on each of those who hurt him.
279	38	"Ojo por ojo"	27 December 2017	1.22
After rescuing Nicolás the doctor tells Daniel and Vicenta that they must do psychology therapy to get him out of the state he is in and when he finds his son again, Jorge thanks Daniel for bringing him back and Nicolás asks him to Indira to stay away from him. Meanwhile, El Indio asks Tecolote who was the person who took his son. El Gallo tells his women that the operation they carried out was a success and with the destruction of the tunnels he is sure that he will win the municipal presidency of Matamoros. The doctor asks Indira to leave the room since his son feels very upset with his presence and Romero asks El Indio to calm down and help him to take revenge on Los Acero for having removed the Tiburon from his side.
280	39	"Salvador muerde el anzuelo"	28 December 2017	1.25
281	40	"Francotirador"	29 December 2017	1.26
282	41	"Una guerra sin fin"	1 January 2018	1.05
283	42	"El lobo, un corderito"	2 January 2018	1.31
284	43	"Casas lanza una bomba"	3 January 2018	1.46
285	44	"La ruta de la muerte"	4 January 2018	1.34
286	45	"Funeral doble"	5 January 2018	1.51
287	46	"Verdades que matan"	8 January 2018	1.30
288	47	"Otro secreto de Vicenta"	9 January 2018	1.27
289	48	"Una familia con Vicenta"	10 January 2018	1.23
290	49	"Premio gordo"	11 January 2018	1.35
291	50	"Cheque en blanco"	12 January 2018	1.32
292	51	"La prueba del heredero"	15 January 2018	N/A
293	52	"Un rehén para escapar"	16 January 2018	N/A
294	53	"Los muertos hablan"	17 January 2018	1.45
295	54	"Phillips en la cuerda floja"	18 January 2018	1.38
296	55	"El acecho"	19 January 2018	1.31
297	56	"Trago amargo"	22 January 2018	1.40
298	57	"Conflictos del pasado"	23 January 2018	1.32
299	58	"El cruce de Aída"	24 January 2018	1.51
300	59	"Miedo al matrimonio"	25 January 2018	1.47
301	60	"Maldita casualidad"	26 January 2018	1.43
302	61	"El soplón"	29 January 2018	1.36
303	62	"Torbellino de amor y dolor"	30 January 2018	1.03
304	63	"Un trato humillante"	31 January 2018	1.23
305	64	"Vínculo de sangre"	1 February 2018	1.34
306	65	"Todos contra Phillips"	2 February 2018	1.24
307	66	"Los Acero raptan al presidente"	5 February 2018	1.41
308	67	"El presidente suelta la sopa"	6 February 2018	1.38
309	68	"Romero despista a los Acero"	7 February 2018	1.35
310	69	"Hijo de Phillips como anzuelo"	8 February 2018	1.32
311	70	"Hijo de Phillips con los Acero"	9 February 2018	1.16
After learning that his son was taken by the service authorities; Daniel does everything possible to get him out of this place and after achieving this; Diego asks Daniel for an explanation of why he should leave with him and not with Leonor. La Tuti tells Azuceno to release Roscas since she is not interested in living at Romero's ranch; but El Indio Amaro takes advantage of this situation to tell the Tuti not to defend that man since he was the person who wanted to kill his son when he was a newborn. Salvador tells Victoria that they are celebrating because they will receive a very special guest. After clarifying the hierarchies at the ranch, Romero tells La Tuti that she learned that she lent a large amount of money to El Gallo without caring that it was one of her enemies and Frida grabs a video to clarify to her son who is Daniel. After the coup d'état the ex-president Heriberto Roca remains imprisoned until his trial saying the names of the deceased allies, accomplices and friends before Romero who makes the last visit to release him but in reality he put poison in his drink and then he dies instantaneously. After the death of Roca, the legacy of Chucho Casares comes to an end and El Gallo becomes municipal president of Matamoros.
312	71	"Romero e Indira hacen el amor"	12 February 2018	1.44
313	72	"El Indio secuestra a los Acero"	13 February 2018	1.46
314	73	"Vicenta acepta ser canjeada"	14 February 2018	1.44
315	74	"Vicenta es el señuelo"	15 February 2018	N/A
316	75	"Roscas paga con su vida"	16 February 2018	N/A
Upon meeting face to face with Salvador, El Roscas takes him to a place where they can fix their differences that they have had for years. Leonor tells her friend that her case was complicated; but upon hearing this, Frida tells her that she will wait patiently for things to be resolved in the best way and that when she leaves the jail she will take revenge on the person who took away the right to be with her son. Meanwhile; Romero decides that he will remain in the country since he is sure that Los Acero will lower his guard and he will be able to carry out his plans. Indira asks El Indio to think things through and take advantage of the situation to escape from Romero's hands. Upon returning to the house Victoria is greeted with great joy by her grandson Aida and Josefina; But these women take advantage of the moment to ask where the other members of the family are.
317	76	"Pepito se suicida"	19 February 2018	1.62
After destroying the ranch of El Indio, Salvador tries to convince José Ángel not to take his life and forgives him for everything he did, but unfortunately José Ángel explodes the place where Romero had all his money and weapons and loses his life to save your friend. After this, the Acero-Quintanilla clan plans the crossing of migrants on the border, but they are intervened by Indira and El Indio, and after a long confrontation, El Indio makes Daniel's boat explode, leaving him seriously injured.
318	77	"Ajustician al Indio Amaro"	20 February 2018	1.84
Daniel is in poor condition and now Vicenta together with Bebote are responsible for taking him to the security bunker for a doctor to intervene quickly, but unfortunately the doctor announces that Daniel has persistent vegetative state. Azuceno asks Romero because he is carrying out his revenge against Daniel because he thinks he is not fulfilling his revenge against Los Acero. On the other hand, El Indio tries to escape; but Salvador and El Gallo are in charge of pursuing him and after this; Bebote looks for Vicenta to tell him that El Gallo and Salvador managed to capture El Indio. Vicenta, El Gallo and Salvador are in charge of ending the life of El Indio and ending all the damage that caused them. After the death of El Indio, in New York a letter arrives to an unknown prisoner, who turns out to be El Teca and learns that his ally was killed by the Acero-Quintanilla clan, and swears to make them pay for the death of El Indio. Special guest stars: José Luis Reséndez as El Teca

== Production ==
=== Development ===
On May 16, 2017 it was announced that the series would be renewed for a fourth season for the 2017-2018 television season. The production of the fourth season began on May 31, 2017 in Mexico, and was officially confirmed on July 6, 2017, created by Roberto Stopello and written by Indira Páez. It is an original production of Telemundo Studios, made by Argos Comunicación, directed by Miguel Varoni and Felipe Aguilar under the executive production of Mariana Iskandarani.

=== Filming ===
The series has locations such as Nuevo Laredo, Tamaulipas, Falfurrias, Texas, New York, United States, Tijuana, San Diego, and McAllen. Much of the production has also been recorded up in Baja Estudios in Rosarito, Mexico, where films and series such as Titanic, Pearl Harbor, The Walking Dead and Pirates of the Caribbean have been filmed.

=== Casting ===
Main cast members Carolina Miranda, Luis Ernesto Franco, Ana Lucía Domínguez, Jorge Zárate, and Gaby Espino return from previous seasons as Vicenta Acero, Daniel Phillips, La Tuti, El Indio Amaro, and Indira Cárdenas, respectively. Although Espino and Zárate are accredited in the theme of opening after the logo, the sources and accredit them as protagonists.

On July 7, 2017 the inclusion of Diego Cadavid to the main cast was confirmed.

=== Promotion ===
The first advance of the fourth season was launched on Telemundo on 24 August 2017, during Telemundo's annual awards, where Diego Cadavid was presented for the first time as Mr. Romero, one of the new villains of the plot. The second breakthrough was revealed in September 2017, where Blanca Soto appeared, only as a souvenir that had the character of Michel Duval, and that caused great commotion in social networks. The complete advance of the telenovela was launched on Telemundo on 17 October 2017, during the broadcast of the fifth season of El Señor de los Cielos.

== Recepetion ==
The first episode of the season was seen by a total of 1.77 million viewers, thus surpassing its closest competition Caer en tentación that only averages a total of 1.45 million viewers. Even so, the season did not manage to be among the most watched during his schedule of 10pm/9c, and without managing to surpass his successor El Señor de los Cielos. The final episode of the season obtained a total of 1.84 million viewers, unlike the previous seasons, its average was very low, but it remained a leader in audience in its schedule.
