= Martijn Kuiper =

Dutch actor (born 1970)

- Born: 26 November 1970 (age 55); Amsterdam, Netherlands
- Occupation: Actor
- Years active: 1997–present

Martijn Kuiper (born 26 November 1970) is a Dutch actor. He has played roles on Spanish television. In 2016 he won the award for best actor in the International Festival of Short Films of Terror and Fantastic "Terroríficamente Cortos". He won the "Ojitos" prize for best actor of the 2020 Morelia International Film Festival for his role in Ricochet, a film by Rodrigo Fiallega.

== Filmography ==
=== Film ===
Year	Title	Role	Notes
1997	Amor de hombre	John	
1999	La sombra de Caín	El Holandés	
2010	Secuestrados	Asaltante Fuerte	
2014	Una semana de ocho días	Policía	
2014	Schimbare	Radu	
2015	Last Memory	John	Short film
2015	Dil Dhadakne Do	Doctor	
2015	The Cloud	Mike	Short film
2020	Ricochet	Martin	

=== Television roles ===
Year	Title	Role	Notes
2000	Compañeros	El alemán	Episode: "Va a ser verdad que estás madurando"
2001	Antivicio	Alexander	Episode: "Tiburones del este"
2001–2002	Al salir de clase	Encargado del CBC	16 episodes
2003	Ana y los 7	Invitado	2 episodes
2003	Los Serrano	Policía americano	Episode: "Sodoma y Gomera"
2005	Un paso adelante	Bailarín	Episode: "Que viene el loco"
2005	Aquí no hay quien viva	David	Episode: "Érase un vicio"
2005	Al filo de la ley	Petrovic	Episode: "Secuestro"
2005	Los hombres de Paco	Unknown role	Episode: "De la fosa al pilón"
2007	Quart	Rodrigo	6 episodes
2008	Dos de mayo, la libertad de una nación	Philippe Lenglén	9 episodes
2008	Sin tetas no hay paraíso	Anatoli	6 episodes
2009	Somos cómplices	Harvey Slater	2 episodes
2011	Ángel o demonio	Goran Bulajic	Episode: "Ojo por ojo"
2011	Águila Roja	Conde de Olsen	2 episodes
2013	Libres	Richard Van der Mer	Episode: "El concierto"
2014	Velvet	Joost Groen	Episode: "Noche de reyes"
2016-2018	Sr. Ávila	Cardoso	15 episodes
2016	Entre correr y vivir	Valdini	
2017-2018	Señora Acero	Gregory Jones	19 episodes (Season 4)
2018	Ingobernable	Simón Chase	11 episodes
2018	Run Coyote Run	Taylor	Episode: "Toys for the boys"
2018-2019	Falsa identidad	Jim Chance	74 episodes (season 1)
2023-present	El Señor de los Cielos	Lucas Manzano	
2026	Mal de Amores	Dr. Hogan	Netflix series
