= List of Señora Acero episodes =

Señora Acero (English title: Woman of Steel), is an American telenovela produced by Telemundo and distributed by Telemundo Television Studios and Argos Comunicación.

During the course of the series, 387 episodes of Señora Acero aired over five seasons.

== Series overview ==
Series	Episodes	Originally released	
Series	Episodes	First released	Last released
1	73	23 September 2014	12 January 2015
2	75	22 September 2015	11 January 2016
3	93	19 July 2016	5 December 2016
4	77	6 November 2017	20 February 2018
5	69	15 October 2018	29 January 2019

== Episodes ==
=== Season 1 (2014-15) ===
No. overall	No. in season	Title	Original release date
1	1	"Novia y viuda"	23 September 2014
2	2	"Viuda de narco"	24 September 2014
3	3	"Felipe maltrata a Sara"	25 September 2014
4	4	"Sara salvada"	26 September 2014
5	5	"Sara en la mira"	29 September 2014
6	6	"Salvador se desmaya"	30 September 2014
7	7	"Matar a Junio"	1 October 2014
8	8	"Salvador despierta"	2 October 2014
9	9	"Mariana está embarazada"	3 October 2014
10	10	"Hallazgo peligroso"	6 October 2014
11	11	"Berta quiere matar a Sara"	7 October 2014
12	12	"Arrestan a Sara"	8 October 2014
13	13	"Paliza"	9 October 2014
14	14	"Sara es apuñalada"	10 October 2014
15	15	"Junio y Mariana mueren"	13 October 2014
16	16	"Elio besa a Sara"	14 October 2014
17	17	"Sara contra Juan"	15 October 2014
18	18	"Sara contra Enriqueta"	16 October 2014
19	19	"Todo por un hijo"	17 October 2014
20	20	"Acusan a Elio"	20 October 2014
21	21	"Mentira descubierta"	21 October 2014
22	22	"Ataque de Juan"	22 October 2014
23	23	"Corazón sufriente"	23 October 2014
24	24	"Elio roba a los narcos"	24 October 2014
25	25	"Elio es secuestrado"	27 October 2014
26	26	"Sara quiere entrar en el negocio"	28 October 2014
27	27	"Quintanilla generoso"	29 October 2014
28	28	"Oferta de trabajo"	30 October 2014
29	29	"Pasión desatada"	3 November 2014
30	30	"Sara torturada"	4 November 2014
31	31	"Liberan a Sara"	5 November 2014
32	32	"Encargo de muerte"	6 November 2014
33	33	"Salvados de la muerte"	7 November 2014
34	34	"Adiós Enriqueta"	10 November 2014
35	35	"Elio mata a Juan"	11 November 2014
36	36	"Muerte fingida"	12 November 2014
37	37	"Sara en peligro"	13 November 2014
38	38	"Con las manos en el dinero"	14 November 2014
39	39	"Bautismo de mafia"	17 November 2014
40	40	"Arresto en la frontera"	18 November 2014
41	41	"Intento de abuso"	19 November 2014
42	42	"Amenaza de muerte"	20 November 2014
43	43	"Hueso de Enriqueta"	21 November 2014
44	44	"Entregar a Quintanilla"	24 November 2014
45	45	"Elio herido"	25 November 2014
46	46	"Cruz interrogada"	28 November 2014
47	47	"Confesión forzada"	1 December 2014
48	48	"Propuesta del Teca"	2 December 2014
49	49	"Elio es asesinado"	3 December 2014
50	50	"Sara desconsolada"	4 December 2014
51	51	"Sara profuga"	5 December 2014
52	52	"Salvador resentido"	8 December 2014
53	53	"El Indio tras Sara"	9 December 2014
54	54	"Sara asaltada"	10 December 2014
55	55	"Cierre de trato"	11 December 2014
56	56	"Sara arranca el negocio"	12 December 2014
57	57	"Obsesión por Sara"	15 December 2014
58	58	"Mujer del capo"	16 December 2014
59	59	"Nuevos tratos"	17 December 2014
60	60	"Sara salvadora"	18 December 2014
61	61	"Madre asesinada"	19 December 2014
62	62	"Amor protector"	22 December 2014
63	63	"Manuel amenazado"	23 December 2014
64	64	"Sara arrepentida"	26 December 2014
65	65	"Cornelia amenazada"	29 December 2014
66	66	"Muere Felipe"	30 December 2014
67	67	"Por mentirosa"	2 January 2015
68	68	"Sara secuestrada"	5 January 2015
69	69	"¿Señora de El Teca?"	6 January 2015
70	70	"Vete Manuel"	7 January 2015
71	71	"Salvador secuestrado"	8 January 2015
72	72	"Un enemigo menos"	9 January 2015
73	73	"Sara atrapada"	12 January 2015

=== Season 2 (2015-16) ===
No. overall	No. in season	Title	Original release date
74	1	"Sara es condenada"	22 September 2015
75	2	"Sara intenta escapar"	23 September 2015
76	3	"Sara y Makoki luchan a muerte"	24 September 2015
77	4	"Sara ve a Salvador"	25 September 2015
78	5	"El Teca puede liberara a Sara"	28 September 2015
79	6	"Sara se enfrenta al Teca"	29 September 2015
80	7	"Aracely ve morir a Plutarco"	30 September 2015
81	8	"Amaro frente a Sara"	1 October 2015
82	9	"Salvador intenta matar a Sara"	5 October 2015
83	10	"Manuel contra El Teca"	6 October 2015
84	11	"Sara negocia con El Teca"	7 October 2015
85	12	"Sara es la mujer del Teca"	9 October 2015
86	13	"Manuel se siente traicionado"	12 October 2015
87	14	"Sara y El Indio, a muerte"	13 October 2015
88	15	"Sara negociará con los chinos"	14 October 2015
89	16	"Briceida celosa de Sara"	15 October 2015
90	17	"Sara y Briceida se enfrentan a muerte"	16 October 2015
91	18	"Sara besa al Teca"	19 October 2015
92	19	"Sara debe matar a Dóriga"	20 October 2015
93	20	"Sara le confiesa todo a Salvador"	21 October 2015
94	21	"Manuel se acuesta con la Tuti"	22 October 2015
95	22	"Sara le dispara a Dóriga"	23 October 2015
96	23	"El Indio Amaro se humilla"	26 October 2015
97	24	"Trampa para Sara"	27 October 2015
98	25	"El Teca descubre el engaño de Sara"	28 October 2015
99	26	"El indio tortura a Sara"	29 October 2015
100	27	"Sara asesina al Teca Martínez"	30 October 2015
101	28	"Dóriga salva a Sara"	2 November 2015
102	29	"Manuel enfurece al saber que Teca violó a Sara"	3 November 2015
103	30	"Briceida no quiere hacer negocios con Sara"	4 November 2015
104	31	"La Tuti besa a Aurelio Casillas"	5 November 2015
105	32	"Sara descubre que Josefina es infiel"	6 November 2015
106	33	"El Indio Amaro y El Gallo se enfrentan a muerte"	9 November 2015
107	34	"Sara busca desesperada a su hijo"	10 November 2015
108	35	"Salvador se está quedando ciego"	11 November 2015
109	36	"Manuel le dispara al hijo del Teca"	12 November 2015
110	37	"Sara sufre al internar a Salvador"	13 November 2015
111	38	"El Teca despierta del coma"	16 November 2015
112	39	"Manuel y Sara celebran su aniversario"	17 November 2015
113	40	"El Teca despierta del coma"	18 November 2015
114	41	"Salvador descubre a Begoña con Pepito"	19 November 2015
115	42	"El Teca ordena eliminar a Sara"	20 November 2015
116	43	"La Tuti espera un hijo de Manuel"	23 November 2015
117	44	"Sara sale ilesa del atentado al avión"	24 November 2015
118	45	"Alfredo entrena para matar a Sara"	25 November 2015
119	46	"Sara sufre al no poder tener hijos"	27 November 2015
120	47	"Sara se encuentra con Alfredo"	30 November 2015
121	48	"Sara le prohibe a Salvador volver con Begoña"	1 December 2015
122	49	"Sara quiere destruir al procurador"	2 December 2015
123	50	"El Indio y Berta sobreviven a la explosión"	3 December 2015
124	51	"Miriam ve morir a Joaquín"	4 December 2015
125	52	"Aracely amenaza a Mario"	7 December 2015
126	53	"Salvador mata a un agente de la DEA"	8 December 2015
127	54	"Miriam y Pepito son arrestados"	9 December 2015
128	55	"Berta y Sara se enfrentan a muerte"	10 December 2015
129	56	"El Teca encuentra a Salvador en el túnel"	11 December 2015
130	57	"Quintanilla se enfrenta al Gallo"	14 December 2015
131	58	"Quintanilla abandona el cartel"	15 December 2015
132	59	"Manuel descubre el engaño de la Tuti"	16 December 2015
133	60	"El Indio escapa con Berta del Teca"	17 December 2015
134	61	"El Teca mata a Quintanilla"	18 December 2015
135	62	"El Teca va a ser abuelo"	21 December 2015
136	63	"Sara recibe la cabeza de Quintanilla"	22 December 2015
137	64	"Sara y Manuel se reconcilian"	23 December 2015
138	65	"El Gallo atrapa al hijo del Teca Martínez: Part 1"	25 December 2015
139	66	"El Gallo atrapa al hijo del Teca Martínez: Part 2"	28 December 2015
140	67	"El Teca sufre por la muerte de su hijo"	29 December 2015
141	68	"El Indio se le enfrenta al Teca Martinez"	30 December 2015
142	69	"El Indio se comunica con Jairo para hablar con Sara"	1 January 2016
143	70	"El Teca elimina a Miriam"	4 January 2016
144	71	"Sara jura vengar a Miriam"	5 January 2016
145	72	"Alfredo quiere matar al Teca"	6 January 2016
146	73	"Salvador sufre por la muerte de Begoña"	7 January 2016
147	74	"Dóriga se entrega a la DEA para salvar a Salvador"	8 January 2016
148	75	"El Teca mata a Sara"	11 January 2016

=== Season 3: La Coyote (2016) ===
No. overall	No. in season	Title	Original release date	US viewers (millions)
149	1	"Chapter 1"	19 July 2016	N/A
150	2	"Vicenta se la juega por su madre"	20 July 2016	N/A
151	3	"Chapter 3"	21 July 2016	N/A
152	4	"Chapter 4"	22 July 2016	N/A
153	5	"Chapter 5"	25 July 2016	N/A
154	6	"Chapter 6"	26 July 2016	N/A
155	7	"Chapter 7"	27 July 2016	N/A
156	8	"Chapter 8"	28 July 2016	N/A
157	9	"Chapter 9"	29 July 2016	N/A
158	10	"Chapter 10"	1 August 2016	N/A
159	11	"Chapter 11"	2 August 2016	N/A
160	12	"Chapter 12"	3 August 2016	N/A
161	13	"Chapter 13"	4 August 2016	N/A
162	14	"Chapter 14"	5 August 2016	N/A
163	15	"Chapter 15"	8 August 2016	N/A
164	16	"Chapter 16"	9 August 2016	N/A
165	17	"Manuel es baleado"	10 August 2016	N/A
166	18	"Chapter 18"	11 August 2016	N/A
167	19	"Chapter 19"	12 August 2016	N/A
168	20	"Chapter 20"	15 August 2016	N/A
169	21	"Chapter 21"	16 August 2016	N/A
170	22	"Chapter 22"	17 August 2016	2.10
171	23	"Chapter 23"	18 August 2016	N/A
172	24	"Chapter 24"	19 August 2016	1.81
173	25	"Chapter 25"	22 August 2016	2.01
174	26	"Chapter 26"	23 August 2016	1.99
175	27	"Chapter 27"	24 August 2016	2.07
176	28	"Chapter 28"	26 August 2016	1.79
177	29	"Chapter 29"	29 August 2016	1.91
178	30	"Chapter 30"	30 August 2016	2.06
179	31	"Chapter 31"	31 August 2016	2.02
180	32	"Chapter 32"	1 September 2016	N/A
181	33	"Chapter 33"	5 September 2016	1.85
182	34	"Chapter 34"	6 September 2016	1.96
183	35	"Chapter 35"	7 September 2016	2.08
184	36	"Chapter 36"	8 September 2016	2.09
185	37	"Chapter 37"	9 September 2016	1.96
186	38	"Chapter 38"	12 September 2016	2.06
187	39	"Chapter 39"	13 September 2016	N/A
188	40	"Chapter 40"	14 September 2016	2.22
189	41	"Chapter 41"	15 September 2016	2.01
190	42	"Chapter 42"	16 September 2016	N/A
191	43	"Chapter 43"	19 September 2016	2.22
192	44	"Chapter 44"	20 September 2016	N/A
193	45	"Chapter 45"	21 September 2016	2.05
194	46	"Chapter 46"	22 September 2016	2.14
195	47	"Chapter 47"	23 September 2016	2.04
196	48	"Chapter 48"	27 September 2016	2.10
197	49	"Chapter 49"	28 September 2016	2.12
198	50	"Chapter 50"	29 September 2016	2.25
199	51	"Chapter 51"	30 September 2016	2.10
200	52	"Chapter 52"	3 October 2016	2.22
201	53	"Chapter 53"	4 October 2016	2.17
202	54	"Indira cede al chantaje"	5 October 2016	2.39
203	55	"Don Chucho muerde el anzuelo"	7 October 2016	N/A
204	56	"Pasión desenfrenada"	10 October 2016	2.07
205	57	"Seducción a la medida"	11 October 2016	2.03
206	58	"Sueño americano a la vista"	12 October 2016	2.26
207	59	"¿Atentado por amor?"	13 October 2016	2.11
208	60	"Huele mal"	14 October 2016	1.87
209	61	"Ciego por amor"	17 October 2016	2.01
210	62	"Peligro en el cruce"	18 October 2016	2.22
211	63	"Espionaje en marcha"	19 October 2016	1.48
212	64	"Don Chucho compra el dato"	20 October 2016	2.08
213	65	"En la boca del lobo"	21 October 2016	2.08
214	66	"Acorralados"	24 October 2016	N/A
215	67	"Plomo parejo"	25 October 2016	2.31
216	68	"Tortura sin piedad"	26 October 2016	2.20
217	69	"Cae el Indio Amaro"	27 October 2016	2.24
218	70	"Aracely es de hierro"	28 October 2016	2.32
219	71	"Choque sangriento"	31 October 2016	2.00
220	72	"Amarga verdad"	1 November 2016	2.26
221	73	"Secreto"	2 November 2016	2.11
222	74	"Sed de venganza"	3 November 2016	2.17
223	75	"Carne de cañón"	4 November 2016	1.99
224	76	"Confesión y refugio"	7 November 2016	1.87
225	77	"Cruel venganza"	9 November 2016	2.16
226	78	"Tras el pez gordo"	10 November 2016	2.17
227	79	"Complicidad en ICE"	11 November 2016	2.07
228	80	"Lo quieren soplón"	14 November 2016	2.20
229	81	"Indira acorralada"	16 November 2016	2.04
230	82	"Violador en acción"	17 November 2016	1.99
231	83	"Hacha al traidor"	18 November 2016	N/A
232	84	"Regalo de bodas"	21 November 2016	N/A
233	85	"Traslado en peligro"	22 November 2016	2.44
234	86	"El Indio escurridizo"	23 November 2016	2.11
235	87	"Encierran al poligringo"	24 November 2016	1.31
236	88	"Fuga perfecta"	25 November 2016	1.75
237	89	"Boda de infierno"	29 November 2016	2.47
238	90	"Golpiza a Larry"	30 November 2016	2.24
239	91	"En las garras de Chucho"	1 December 2016	2.25
240	92	"La huida del matón"	2 December 2016	2.34
241	93	"Lo entierran vivo"	5 December 2016	N/A

=== Season 4: La Coyote (2017-2018) ===
No. overall	No. in season	Title	Original release date	US viewers (millions)
242	1	"Los Acero en la clandestinidad"	6 November 2017	1.77
243	2	"Prófugos de la justicia"	7 November 2017	1.54
244	3	"Todo por la familia"	8 November 2017	1.51
245	4	"Pruebas incriminatorias"	9 November 2017	1.37
246	5	"El presidente contra Salvador"	10 November 2017	1.46
247	6	"Momento de la verdad"	13 November 2017	1.58
248	7	"Vicenta y Phillips acorralados"	14 November 2017	1.63
249	8	"Presidente torturador"	15 November 2017	1.47
250	9	"La Coyote no suelta prenda"	16 November 2017	1.42
251	10	"Como gato a su presa"	17 November 2017	1.51
252	11	"Intercambio sangriento"	20 November 2017	1.65
253	12	"Pacto o escándalo"	21 November 2017	1.45
254	13	"Vicenta, a punto de morir"	22 November 2017	1.57
255	14	"La astucia de Romero"	23 November 2017	1.03
256	15	"Peligrosa recompensa"	24 November 2017	1.35
257	16	"Sexo a la fuerza"	27 November 2017	1.53
258	17	"El punto débil de Indira"	28 November 2017	1.64
259	18	"El Gallo en problemas"	29 November 2017	1.24
260	19	"Rescate en marcha"	30 November 2017	1.53
261	20	"Favor con amor se paga"	1 December 2017	1.33
262	21	"Indira desespera"	4 December 2017	1.41
263	22	"Padres desconsolados"	5 December 2017	1.42
264	23	"Locura desenfrenada"	6 December 2017	1.39
265	24	"La pesadilla de los Acero"	7 December 2017	1.24
266	25	"Vicenta en bandeja de plata"	8 December 2017	1.11
267	26	"Superhéroes que no engañan"	11 December 2017	1.19
268	27	"Narcos enardecidos"	12 December 2017	1.38
269	28	"Indira bajo sospecha"	13 December 2017	1.35
270	29	"Vicenta enfrenta a Los Petates"	14 December 2017	1.32
271	30	"El negocio redondo de Salvador"	15 December 2017	1.16
272	31	"Reclutado por el Cártel"	18 December 2017	1.28
273	32	"Otro enemigo para los Acero"	19 December 2017	1.19
274	33	"Domingo se la juega"	20 December 2017	1.24
275	34	"Mente asesina"	21 December 2017	1.22
276	35	"Mala espina"	22 December 2017	1.26
277	36	"Un ejército al rescate"	25 December 2017	0.92
278	37	"A balazo limpio"	26 December 2017	1.20
279	38	"Ojo por ojo"	27 December 2017	1.22
280	39	"Salvador muerde el anzuelo"	28 December 2017	1.25
281	40	"Francotirador"	29 December 2017	1.26
282	41	"Una guerra sin fin"	1 January 2018	1.05
283	42	"El lobo, un corderito"	2 January 2018	1.31
284	43	"Casas lanza una bomba"	3 January 2018	1.46
285	44	"La ruta de la muerte"	4 January 2018	1.34
286	45	"Funeral doble"	5 January 2018	1.51
287	46	"Verdades que matan"	8 January 2018	1.30
288	47	"Otro secreto de Vicenta"	9 January 2018	1.27
289	48	"Una familia con Vicenta"	10 January 2018	1.23
290	49	"Premio gordo"	11 January 2018	1.35
291	50	"Cheque en blanco"	12 January 2018	1.32
292	51	"La prueba del heredero"	15 January 2018	N/A
293	52	"Un rehén para escapar"	16 January 2018	N/A
294	53	"Los muertos hablan"	17 January 2018	1.45
295	54	"Phillips en la cuerda floja"	18 January 2018	1.38
296	55	"El acecho"	19 January 2018	1.31
297	56	"Trago amargo"	22 January 2018	1.40
298	57	"Conflictos del pasado"	23 January 2018	1.32
299	58	"El cruce de Aída"	24 January 2018	1.51
300	59	"Miedo al matrimonio"	25 January 2018	1.47
301	60	"Maldita casualidad"	26 January 2018	1.43
302	61	"El soplón"	29 January 2018	1.36
303	62	"Torbellino de amor y dolor"	30 January 2018	1.03
304	63	"Un trato humillante"	31 January 2018	1.23
305	64	"Vínculo de sangre"	1 February 2018	1.34
306	65	"Todos contra Phillips"	2 February 2018	1.24
307	66	"Los Acero raptan al presidente"	5 February 2018	1.41
308	67	"El presidente suelta la sopa"	6 February 2018	1.38
309	68	"Romero despista a los Acero"	7 February 2018	1.35
310	69	"Hijo de Phillips como anzuelo"	8 February 2018	1.32
311	70	"Hijo de Phillips con los Acero"	9 February 2018	1.16
312	71	"Romero e Indira hacen el amor"	12 February 2018	1.44
313	72	"El Indio secuestra a los Acero"	13 February 2018	1.46
314	73	"Vicenta acepta ser canjeada"	14 February 2018	1.44
315	74	"Vicenta es el señuelo"	15 February 2018	N/A
316	75	"Roscas paga con su vida"	16 February 2018	N/A
317	76	"Pepito se suicida"	19 February 2018	1.62
318	77	"Ajustician al Indio Amaro"	20 February 2018	1.84

=== Season 5: La Coyote (2018-2019) ===
No. overall	No. in season	Title	Original release date	US viewers (millions)
319	1	"Vicenta cobra venganza"	15 October 2018	1.39
320	2	"Vicenta rescata a su hijo"	16 October 2018	1.28
321	3	"Alberto salva a Vicenta"	17 October 2018	1.29
322	4	"Vicenta abandona a su familia"	18 October 2018	1.28
323	5	"Desaparece el hijo de Vicenta"	19 October 2018	1.10
324	6	"Vicenta vive ahora con Alberto"	22 October 2018	1.14
325	7	"Vicenta y su hijo se fugan"	23 October 2018	1.05
326	8	"Ofrecen oro por Vicenta e hijo"	24 October 2018	1.11
327	9	"Vicenta pacta con El Marrano"	26 October 2018	1.05
328	10	"Alberto va por Vicenta"	29 October 2018	1.15
329	11	"La pelea de Salvador y El Teca"	30 October 2018	1.08
330	12	"Los Acero torturan al Teca"	31 October 2018	1.07
331	13	"Alberto arriesga su carrera"	1 November 2018	1.13
332	14	"Alberto y Vicenta se disgustan"	2 November 2018	0.99
333	15	"Vicenta pelea con Sofía"	5 November 2018	1.05
334	16	"Sofía es un cabo suelto"	7 November 2018	1.03
335	17	"Surgen Los Mandrakes"	8 November 2018	1.00
336	18	"Alberto corteja a Vicenta"	9 November 2018	1.06
337	19	"La bienvenida de Sarita Acero"	12 November 2018	0.98
338	20	"Alianza contra Los Acero"	13 November 2018	0.97
339	21	"El Teca busca venganza"	14 November 2018	0.96
340	22	"Salvador al borde de la muerte"	15 November 2018	1.06
341	23	"El Teca está debilitado"	16 November 2018	1.04
342	24	"El destino golpea a Los Acero"	19 November 2018	1.25
343	25	"El Bruto ataca a Los Acero"	20 November 2018	1.10
344	26	"Vicenta se va con Danielito"	21 November 2018	1.01
345	27	"Alberto contra El Teca"	23 November 2018	0.93
346	28	"Vicenta y Daniel en el paraíso"	26 November 2018	1.18
347	29	"A Vicenta algo le huele mal"	27 November 2018	1.03
348	30	"Alberto en la mira"	28 November 2018	1.07
349	31	"A Lucas le atrae Vicenta"	29 November 2018	1.08
350	32	"La Tuti enfrenta a Teca"	30 November 2018	0.94
351	33	"Sospechan del Teca y Floyd"	3 December 2018	0.98
352	34	"Torturan a Alberto"	4 December 2018	0.97
353	35	"Vicenta enfrenta al crimen"	5 December 2018	0.95
354	36	"Alberto logra su objetivo"	6 December 2018	1.02
355	37	"Lucas desespera por Vicenta"	7 December 2018	1.00
356	38	"Intentan atrapar a Vicenta"	10 December 2018	1.02
357	39	"El Teca va por Vicenta"	11 December 2018	0.95
358	40	"Vicenta y su hijo en peligro"	12 December 2018	1.14
359	41	"Alberto busca a Vicenta"	13 December 2018	1.09
360	42	"El Teca rebautiza a su Cártel"	14 December 2018	1.07
361	43	"Plan de Vicenta contra El Teca"	18 December 2018	1.05
362	44	"Vicenta va a la frontera"	19 December 2018	0.96
363	45	"El Teca amenaza a su nieto"	20 December 2018	1.01
364	46	"Alberto burla la seguridad"	21 December 2018	0.89
365	47	"Vicenta se complica"	26 December 2018	1.04
366	48	"Creen que Alberto es un narco"	27 December 2018	0.93
367	49	"Vicenta condiciona al socio"	28 December 2018	0.96
368	50	"Josefina en el blanco del Teca"	1 January 2019	0.81
369	51	"Alvarito ya es un narco"	2 January 2019	0.91
370	52	"Amenazan a Alberto y Vicenta"	3 January 2019	0.96
371	53	"El plan de fuga de Ruíz"	4 January 2019	0.87
372	54	"El Teca: precio a la traición"	7 January 2019	1.00
373	55	"La Tuti ya no es seductora"	8 January 2019	0.99
374	56	"Un regalo de bodas a Los Acero"	9 January 2019	0.93
375	57	"Alvarito juega sucio al Teca"	10 January 2019	1.02
376	58	"Danielito desaparece"	11 January 2019	0.92
377	59	"Alberto al rescate de Daniel"	14 January 2019	0.98
378	60	"Ruíz chantajea al Teca"	15 January 2019	1.01
379	61	"El coraje de Josefina"	16 January 2019	0.93
380	62	"Chepina se entrega a la muerte"	17 January 2019	0.97
381	63	"Alberto entrega a Ruíz"	18 January 2019	0.93
382	64	"El Teca cambia de escondite"	21 January 2019	0.98
383	65	"El Teca exige canje"	22 January 2019	1.07
384	66	"Vicenta se entrega"	23 January 2019	0.95
385	67	"El Teca sorprende al Amable"	24 January 2019	1.01
386	68	"Mecha se juega la vida"	28 January 2019	1.03
387	69	"El Teca en manos de Vicenta"	29 January 2019	1.23

=== Special ===
Title	Original release date	US viewers (millions)
"Lo mejor de Señora Acero: Hacia su nueva temporada"	3 November 2017	1.31
A summary of the third season with the most important scenes in history.
"Especial: Cuarta temporada"	12 November 2017	N/A
Review what happened in the first five chapters of the fourth season.
