= 11-11: En mi cuadra nada cuadra =

Nickelodeon telenovela

- Genre: Telenovela
- Created by: Luis Llosa; Pablo Vásquez
- Directed by: Cary Delgado; Diego Salazar Cely; Cusi Barrio
- Starring: Patricio Gallardo; Thali García; Karla Cervantes; Reinaldo Zavarce; Carolina Ayala; Ana Belén Lander; Virginia Núñez; Hernán Canto; Daniela de la Fe; Emeraude Toubia; Andrea Martínez; Silvana Arias; Óscar Priego
- Opening theme: "En mi cuadra nada cuadra" by Patricio Gallardo, Thali García and Alberich Bormann
- Country of origin: United States
- Original language: Spanish
- No. of seasons: 1
- No. of episodes: 75

Production
- Executive producers: Tatiana Rodríguez; Luis Llosa
- Producers: Mary Black-Suárez; Augusto Navarro; Miriam Luciow; Carla Gómez
- Cinematography: John P. Tarver
- Editor: Gustavo Betalleluz Leyva
- Camera setup: Multi-camera
- Production companies: Somos Productions; Nickelodeon Latin America

Original release
- Network: Nickelodeon Latin America
- Release: June 3 – September 13, 2013

11-11: En Mi Cuadra Nada Cuadra (English title: 11-11: In My Block Nothing Blocks) is an American teen telenovela produced by Nickelodeon Latin America starring Patricio Gallardo, Alberich Bormann and Thali García with Kevin Aponte and Karla Cervantes as the antagonists.

== Series overview ==
Series	Episodes	Originally released	
Series	Episodes	First released	Last released
1	75	3 June 2013	13 September 2013

== Cast and characters ==
=== Main characters ===
- Patricio Gallardo as Enrique "Kike" Calderón, a young man who came to live in building 11-11 where he met a beautiful girl named Sandra, whom he fell in love with, but he discovers a great secret that was hidden in the building.
- Alberich Bormann as Enrique Calderón, this character is the adult version of Kike which opts for life when Kike sleeps for the first time in one of the 3 beds that Don Leonardo invented.
- Thali García as Sandra Jiménez, a talented young woman who can sing and Kike falls in love with seeing her for the first time.
- Kevin Aponte as Esteban Restrepo, series antagonist; is son of Don Maximiliano Restrepo owner of building 11-11, and one of the lovers of Sandra.
- Karla Cervantes as Virginia Ramos
- Reinaldo Zavarce as Juan José "Juanjo" Seminario
- Carolina Ayala as Ana Teresa
- Ana Belén Lander as Karina Calderón
- Virginia Núñez as Anabela
- Hernán Canto as Valentino
- Daniela de la Fe as Denisse
- Emeraude Toubia as Elizabeth
- Andrea Martínez as Ana
- Silvana Arias as Mariana Valle
- Óscar Priego as Joaquín Mendoza

=== Recurring characters ===
- Ismael La Rosa as Jaime Calderón
- Henry Zakka as Don Camilo
- Ricardo Silva as Don Maximiliano Restrepo
- Liliana Rodríguez as Tía Lucrecía
- Estefany Oliveira as Sharon Restrepo
- Flor Núñez as Doña Consuelo
- Jullye Giliberti as Susana Jiménez
- Sandra Destenave as Patricia

=== Special guest stars ===
- Prince Royce as himself

== Awards and nominations ==
Year	Award	Category	Nominated	Result
2013	Kids Choice Awards México			
2013	Kids Choice Awards México	Favorite Actor	Patricio Gallardo	Nominated
2013	Kids Choice Awards México	Favorite Actress	Thali García	Nominated
2013	Kids Choice Awards México	Actor favorite cast	Reinaldo Zavarce	Nominated
2013	Kids Choice Awards México	Actor favorite cast	Alberich Bormann	Nominated
2013	Kids Choice Awards México	Favorite actress cast	Karla Cervantes	Nominated
2013	Kids Choice Awards México	Best Villain	Kevin Aponte	Nominated
2013	Kids Choice Awards Argentina			
2013	Kids Choice Awards Argentina	Actor favorite cast	Reinaldo Zavarce	Nominated
