= Thali García =

Mexican actress

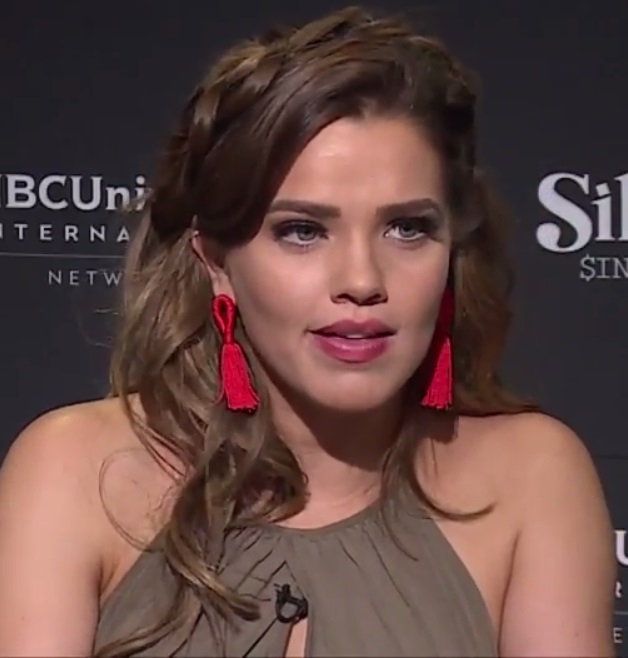
- García in 2018
- Born: Thali Alejandra García Arce; 14 March 1990 (age 36); Hermosillo, Sonora, México
- Occupation: Actress
- Years active: 2008–present
- Spouse: Felipe Aguilar Dulcé (m. 2017)
- Children: 2

Thali Alejandra García Arce (born March 14, 1990), more commonly known by her stage name Thali García, is a Mexican actress who grew up in Hermosillo, Sonora. At the age of 17, she moved from her hometown of Hermosillo to the capital Mexico City. In Mexico City, she was a presenter of Nickers, a television program especially for viewers between the ages of 8 and 15 distributed by Nickelodeon Latin America. In 2017, she became a mother for the second time.

== Filmography ==
Television roles
Year	Title	Roles	Notes
2008	Secretos del alma	Maribel	Recurring role
2011	Bienvenida Realidad	Regina Córdoba	Recurring role
2012	Rosa diamante	Eva Sotomayor	Special participation
2013	11-11: En mi cuadra nada cuadra	Sandra Jiménez	Main role; 75 episodes
2013	Hombre tenías que ser	Gabriela "Gaby" Álvarez	Recurring role
2014	Reina de corazones	Camila de Rosas	Special participation; 14 episodes
2015	UEPA! Un escenario para amar	July Rivero	Recurring role
2016–2017	Silvana sin lana	María de los Ángeles "Angie" Villaseñor	Main cast; 119 episodes
2018–2024	El Señor de los Cielos	Berenice Ahumada	Recurring role
2018	Las Buchonas	Manuela	Main role
2019	Un poquito tuyo	Viviana Solano Montiel	Main role
2022	Los ricos también lloran	Sofía Mandujano	Main cast
2023	Los 50	Herself	Contestant
2024	La casa de los famosos	Herself	Houseguest (season 4)
