= Who Killed Him? =

Mexican biographical true crime television miniseries

- Spanish: ¿Quién lo mató?
- Genre: Crime thriller; Biographical drama
- Created by: Humberto Hinojosa; Rodrigo Ruiz Patterson; Alexandro Aldrete
- Written by: Rodrigo Ruiz Patterson; Alexandro Aldrete
- Directed by: Humberto Hinojosa
- Starring: Diego Boneta; Roberto Duarte; Belinda; Zuria Vega; Jorge Zárate; Javier Ramírez "El Cha"; Luis Gerardo Méndez
- Composer: Rodrigo Dávila
- Country of origin: Mexico
- Original language: Spanish
- No. of seasons: 1
- No. of episodes: 6

Production
- Executive producers: Pablo Cruz; Pablo García Gatterer; Humberto Hinojosa; Diego Suárez Chialvo; Enrique López Lavigne; Rodrigo Ruiz Patterson; Alexandro Aldrete
- Producers: Giulia Cardamone; Abel Cruz
- Editors: Sam Baixauli; Fernanda Gascón
- Production companies: El Estudio; Tigre Pictures

Original release
- Network: Amazon Prime Video
- Release: 24 May – 7 June 2024

Who Killed Him? (Spanish: ¿Quién lo mató?) is a Mexican biographical true crime television miniseries that premiered on Amazon Prime Video on 24 May 2024. The miniseries is about the murder of Mexican television entertainer Paco Stanley. Each episode is told from the perspective of one of six people close to Stanley, sharing their stories of what happened before and after his murder.

== Cast ==
=== Main ===
- Diego Boneta as Jorge Gil
- Roberto Duarte as Paco Stanley
- Belinda as Paola Durante
- Zuria Vega as Brenda Bezares
- Jorge Zárate as Prosecutor Saúl Villareal
- Javier Ramírez "El Cha" as Benito Castillo
- Luis Gerardo Méndez as Mario Rodríguez Bezares

=== Recurring and guest stars ===
- Bárbara López as Susana
- Juan Pablo Molina as Juanito
- Juliette Beltrán as Mafer
- Catherine López as Chiquis
- Mauricio Pimentel as Agent Bernardo
- Jorge Aranda as Agent Humberto
- Erick Delgadillo as El Bolas
- Osmar Leyva Meza as El Hitler
- Carlos Resendiz as El Nalgón
- Raymundo Martínez as Caspita
- Mauricio García Lozano as Jacobo Zabludovsky
- Fabián Corres as Gustavo Pascual
- Constanza Andrade as Gaby Ruffo
- Jess Salgado as Shakira
- Jorge Perezzamora as Emilio Azcárraga Milmo

== Episodes ==
| No. | Title | Original release date |
|---|---|---|
| 1 | "Jorge" | 24 May 2024 |
| 2 | "Mario" | 24 May 2024 |
| 3 | "Benito" | 31 May 2024 |
| 4 | "Brenda" | 31 May 2024 |
| 5 | "Paola" | 7 June 2024 |
| 6 | "Saúl" | 7 June 2024 |

== Production ==
On 11 January 2023, the series was ordered by Amazon Prime Video. In March 2023, it was reported that filming had begun. On 25 March 2024, ¿Quién lo mató? was announced as the title of the series.

== Release ==
The series premiered on Amazon Prime Video on 24 May 2024, with the first two episodes available immediately.
