= Tomás Rojas (actor) =

Mexican actor

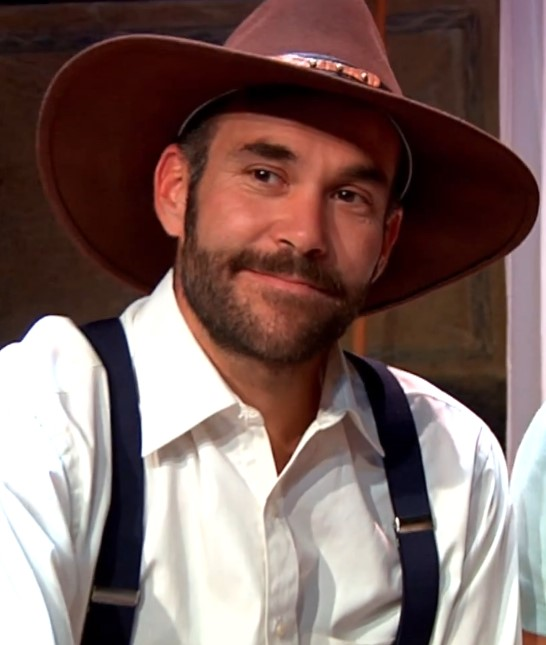
- Rojas in April 2014
- Born: La Paz, Baja California Sur, Mexico
- Occupation: Actor
- Years active: 2010–present

Tomás Rojas is a Mexican actor. (born in La Paz, Baja California Sur, Mexico). in France it was part of the Marche et dance workshops, and he also studied construction and handling of mojigangas. He is most recognized for his theater works in Mexico.

== Filmography ==
=== Film roles ===
Year	Title	Role	Notes
2010	A través del silencio	Iliasi	
2011	La cebra	Officer Echevarria	
2012	Playing Grown Up	Rodrigo	Short film
2014	La dictadura perfecta	Analista TV MX	
2015	Apasionado Pancho Villa	Tomás Urbina	
2016	De las muertas	Ángel	
2017	Cuando los hijos regresan	Gilberto	
2020	El club de los idealistas	Omar	
2021	La negociadora	Tulio	Netflix
2024	Fine Young Men	Alfredo	

=== Television roles ===
Year	Title	Role	Notes
2011	El encanto del águila	Secretario de Porfirio Díaz	3 episodes
2016–2017	Perseguidos	Agente CIN	5 episodes
2017	Sincronía	Ulises	4 episodes
2017	Señora Acero	Eladio Puertas	Recurring role (season 4); 10 episodes
2017	Falsos falsificados	Tramando "agente especial"	Secundario
2018	Enemigo íntimo	Marcelo González "El Orejas"	Recurring role (season 1); 44 episodes
2018	Falco	Javier Santos	Episode: "Bocanada"
2019	Sitiados: México	Comandante Español	Recurring role (season 1); 5 episodes
