= Jorge Zárate (actor) =

Mexican film, television, and theater actor

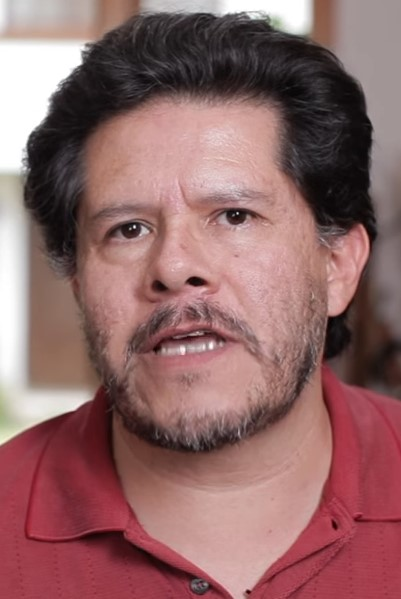
- Zárate in 2012
- Born: Jorge Zárate; November 1, 1962 (age 63); Mexico City, Mexico
- Education: Metropolitan Autonomous University
- Occupation: Actor
- Years active: 1984-present
- Children: 2

Jorge Zárate (born November 1, 1962) is a Mexican film, television, and theater actor. He is known for his starring role as El Indio Amaro in the Telemundo telenovela Señora Acero.

== Early life and career ==
Zárate, born in Mexico City, studied communications at the Metropolitan Autonomous University. He made his acting debut in 1984 and since then has participated in more than 30 plays and 20 films including Panchito Rex, Nicotina, Las Vueltas del Citrillo, Herod's Law, Hell, and Tlatelolco, verano del 68. In 2008, he won an Ariel Award for his role in the film Dos Abrazos.

== Filmography ==
Film
Year	Title	Role	Notes
1994	Novia que te vea	Carmona	
1995	La vida se amputa en seco	Ladrón	Short film
1996	Sucesos distantes	Heberto	
1997	Adela despierta despierta	Narrator / Luna	Short film
1997	Sistole Diastole	Edmundo	Short film
1999	La ley de Herodes	Tiburón	
2000	Gimme the Power	Taxista enpistolado	
2000	Antes que anochezca	Prosecutor	
2001	Piedras verdes	Agente 1	
2001	Un mundo raro	Cayubas	
2001	De la calle	Carnicero / Don Lenche	
2002	Vivir mata	Taquero	
2002	Las caras de la luna	Pulido	
2002	Ciudades oscuras	Encargado	
2002	El crimen del padre Amaro	Padre Mauro	
2003	La hija del caníbal	Blanco	
2003	Zurdo	Pavis	
2003	Dame tu cuerpo	Mauri	
2003	El misterio del Trinidad	Accidentado	
2003	Nicotina	Sánchez	
2003	DeLímite de tiempo	Hombre	
2004	Puerto Vallarta Squeeze	Víctor	
2004	A Silent Love	Sr. Valdivia	
2004	Man on Fire	Customs Official	Uncredited
2010	El Infierno	El Huasteco	
2014	Eddie Reynolds y los ángeles de acero	Fernando	

Television
Year	Title	Role	Notes
1997	Mujer, casos de la vida real	Unknown role	Episode: "Una lección de amor"
1997	Gente bien	Esteban	Recurring role; 88 episodes
1999	Cuentos para solitarios	Dionisio/Doctor #1	2 episodes
2001	El guardián de Red Rock	Jim Johnson	Television film
2002	Fidel	Coronel del Río Chaviano	Television film
2003	Dos chicos de cuidado en la ciudad	Toribio	
2010	Gritos de muerte y libertad	Inquisidor Tirado	Episode: "La última conjura"
2010	Capadocia	Nuro Vega	Recurring role; 6 episodes
2012	El albergue	Don Billy	
2012	La ruta blanca	Capitán Sánchez	
2013	El Señor de los Cielos	Juan Montoya	Recurring role (season 1); 14 episodes
2014–2018	Señora Acero	"El Indio" Amaro Rodríguez	Main role (seasons 1–4); 296 episodes
2018	El secreto de Selena	Abraham Quintanilla	Recurring role; 13 episodes
2020	Operación Pacífico	El Doctor	Recurring role
2024	¿Quién lo mató?	Prosecutor Villareal	Main role
