= Rossana San Juan =

Mexican actress and singer (born 1969)

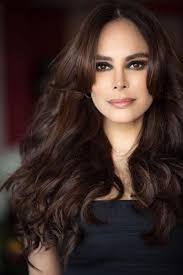
- Born: Rossana San Juan; 30 August 1969 (age 56); Acaponeta, Nayarit, Mexico
- Occupations: Actress, singer
- Years active: 1988–present

Rossana San Juan (born 30 August 1969 in Acaponeta, Nayarit, Mexico) is a Mexican actress and singer who has participated in various productions, both movies and soap operas. She has a degree in neuroscience and a BA in Communication Sciences, even has an office where she sees patients in need as a psychoanalyst.

== Filmography ==
Telenovelas
Year	Title	Role	Notes
1992–93	María Mercedes	Zafirio	Supporting Role
1993–94	El peñón del amaranto	Victoria	Protagonist
1998–99	Ángela	Susana Chavez	Supporting Role
2000–01	Abrázame muy fuerte	Raquela Campusano	Main Antagonist
2002	Cómplices al rescate	Lorna Rico	Supporting Role
2004	Amy, la niña de la mochila azul	Soledad	Supporting Role
2005–06	Barrera de amor	Magdalena	Supporting Role
2006	La Verdad Oculta	Yolanda Rey (young)	Special Appearance
2007	Bajo las riendas del amor	Claudia Garcia	Supporting Role
2007–08	Al diablo con los guapos	Roxana	Supporting Role
2009	Verano de amor	Celina	Supporting Role
2010	Soy tu dueña	Crisanta Camargo	Supporting Role
2011	Mi corazón insiste en Lola Volcán	Soledad Volcán	Supporting Role
2012–13	La mujer del Vendaval	Valeria Ferreira Preciado	Antagonist
2014	Señora Acero	Mariana Huerdo de Acero	Special Appearance
2017	Enamorándome de Ramón	Ofelia Manríquez	Special Appearance
2022	Los ricos tambien lloran	Abogada de Soraya Montenegro	Special Appearance
2023	Mi camino es amarte	Zulema	Special Appearance
