= William Miller (actor, born 1978) =

Multi-nationality actor, singer (b. 1978)

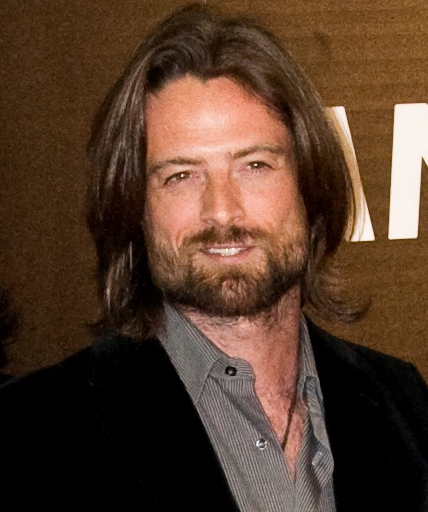
- Miller in 2010
- Born: William Thomas Francis Miller; 9 September 1978 (age 48); Windsor, Berkshire, England
- Occupations: Actor, singer
- Years active: 2000–present

William Thomas Francis Miller (born 9 September 1978) is an English actor and singer based in Spain.

Miller studied History, Archeology and Performing Arts in Spain, and speaks English, Spanish, Catalan, and French. He is well known for working in several Spanish television series, and has played supporting roles in Spanish, Mexican, American, British and French films.

Miller has also worked in theatre, including classical Spanish plays and musicals, and was the frontman of the Spanish rock band Deniro for five years.

He is currently working on several projects, nationally and internationally, also started producing and directing short films, nominated in film festivals in Spain. In Music William is still active with Rage Against the Machine tribute band: RAGE RISING.

== Selected filmography & Music ==
=== Films ===
- Tempus fugit (2003) as Andros
- Rottweiler (2004) as Dante
- La Conjura de El Escorial (2008) as Captain Rodrigo de Villena
- Sagan (2008) as Robert Westhorff
- Sans laisser de traces (Traceless) (2010), as Ritchie Brown
- Cinco de mayo: La batalla (2013) as Charles Ferdinand de Latrille, Conde de Lorencez
- Jim doesn't know what to say (TV movie) (2014) as Lance
- Los miércoles no existen (2015) as Hugo
- The Midnight Man (2016) as Nomack
- Megan Leavey (2016) as Constable
- Ruta Madre (Going South) (2016) as Rodrigo
- Don't Look at the Demon (2022) as Ian
- Crawlers (2026)

=== Television series ===
- Cuéntame cómo pasó, (La 1, 2002-2021), as Mike
- Un paso adelante, (Antena 3, 2005), as Nacho (3 episodes)
- 2 de mayo, la libertad de una nación, (Telemadrid, 2008)
- Hay alguien ahí (Cuatro, 2009–2010)
- Above suspicion (ITV, 2012), as Rupert Mitchell (2 episodes)
- Isabel (La 1, 2012-2013), as Beltrán de la Cueva
- Perception (TNT, 2014), as Cyrus Dunham (1 episode)
- Sr. Ávila (HBO, 2014), as Marco Stell (2 episodes)
- Las aventuras del Capitán Alatriste (based on Captain Alatriste) (Telecinco, 2015), as Duke of Buckingham
- La que se avecina (Telecinco, 2016), as Héctor
- The 100 (The CW, 2018), as Paxton "Graveyard" McCreary
- Señora Acero (season 5) (Telemundo, 2018-2019), as Acasio "El Teca" Martinez #2
- Warrior Nun (Netflix, 2020–2022), as Adriel

=== Music ===
- Candymen, rock band from Salou (Tarragona) 2000-2010, voice and guitar. Album: Indignation (2010)
- Deniro, Madrid rock band, 2010-2013, voice. Albums: El extraño disfrazado de normal (2011), De héroes y gobernantes (2013)
- Rage Rising, Rage Against the Machine tribute band, 2019 - actual, voice. Official Medley: https://www.youtube.com/watch?v=tIWe2s0ob-M
