= Luciana Silveyra =

Mexican actress (born 1976)

- Born: Luciana Silveyra de la Garza; February 11, 1976 (age 49); Mexico City, Distrito Federal, Mexico
- Other names: Luciana Silveira
- Occupation: Actress
- Years active: 2002-present

Luciana Silveyra (born February 11, 1976, in Mexico City) is a Mexican actress, best known for her roles in the telenovelas Rosa diamante, Nora and Señora Acero.

== Filmography ==
=== Films ===
Year	Title	Role	Notes
2005	O Casamento de Romeu e Julieta	Mulher no Boteco	Film debut
2006	Sólo Dios sabe	Bisavó	
2011	Vendaval	Mariana	Short film

=== Television ===
Year	Title	Role	Notes
2001-02	Lo que es el amor	Ángela	Television debut
2003	Dos chicos de cuidado en la ciudad	Carmen	
2004	La vida es una canción	Unknown role	Episode: "Puede ser"
2004-05	Lo que callamos las mujeres	Unknown role	2 episodes
2006	Ni una vez más	Margarita	
2007	Cambio de vida	Unknown role	Episode: "Malos consejos"
2007	La niñera	C.C. Corcuera	20 episodes
2008	Tengo todo	Unknown role	
2010	Las Aparicio	Yolanda Bernal	
2010	Capadocia	Marla Santibáñez	4 episodes
2011	El sexo débil	Tamara Salazar	
2012	Rosa diamante	Margarita Puentes / Margaret Bridges	Co-lead role
2014	Nora	Flor Elena Santamaria	Co-lead role
2014-15	Señora Acero	Berta Aguilar	
2016	Sr. Ávila	Laura Bostock	2 episodes
2016	Entre correr y vivir	Ximena	
2017	Sincronía	Fernanda	Episode: "Bloque 2 - El empresario corrupto"
