= Óscar Priego =

Mexican actor

- Born: November 21, 1985 (age 40); Mexico City, Mexico
- Occupation: Actor
- Years active: 2012–present

Óscar Priego, is a Mexican television actor, known for Relaciones peligrosas, 11-11: En mi cuadra nada cuadra, Dama y obrero and Señora Acero.

== Filmography ==
Television
Year	Title	Role	Notes
2012	Relaciones peligrosas	Gonzalo Mendoza	Television debut
2013	11-11: En mi cuadra nada cuadra	Joaquín Mendoza	
2013	Dama y obrero	Rubén Santamaría	
2014	En otra piel	Jacinto Aguilar	"Capítulo 1" (Season 1, Episode 1)
2015–2019	Señora Acero	Erick Quintanilla "El Gallo"	Series regular
	Frank & Ana	Raul	Filming
