= Señora Acero =

- Señora Acero season four title card
- Genre: Telenovela
- Created by: Roberto Stopello
- Written by: Various: Juan Manuel Andrade; Gabriela Caballero; Camilo Hernández; Christian Jiménez; José Vicente Spataro; Sergio Mendoza; José Miguel Núñez; Amarís Páez; Indira Páez
- Directed by: Various: Miguel Varoni (2014–2019); Walter Doehner; Jaime Segura; Carlos Villegas Rosales; Daniel Aguirre; Danny Gavidia; Marcela Mejía; Camilo Villamizar; Felipe Aguilar D.
- Creative directors: Olin Díaz; Maria Eugenia González-Naranjo; Claudia Vergara
- Starring: Blanca Soto; Litzy; Damián Alcázar; Marco Pérez; Jorge Zárate; Rossana San Juan; Andrés Palacios; Rebecca Jones; José Luis Reséndez; Lincoln Palomeque; Alejandro Calva; Carolina Miranda; Luis Ernesto Franco; Sergio Goyri; Laura Flores; José María Torre; Ana Lucía Domínguez; Gaby Espino; Diego Cadavid; William Miller; David Chocarro; Paulina Gaitán; Mauricio Islas; Dagoberto Gama; Maria Rojo
- Theme music composer: Mario Quintero Lara
- Opening theme: See below
- Country of origin: United States
- Original language: Spanish
- No. of seasons: 5
- No. of episodes: 387 (list of episodes)

Production
- Executive producers: Mariana Iskandariani (2015–2019); Carmen Cecilia Urbaneja; Ana Graciela Ugalde; Joshua Mintz (2014–2016); Martha Godoy
- Production locations: Miami, Florida; Cuernavaca, Morelos; Pachuca, Hidalgo; Tijuana, Baja California; Guadalajara, Jalisco; Mexico City, Mexico; Los Angeles, California; El Paso, Texas (season 3–5); San Diego, California; Ciudad Juárez, Chihuahua; Buenos Aires, Argentina
- Cinematography: Pablo Reyes; Damián Aguilar; Esteban de Llaca; Andrés León Becker; Juan Bernardo Sánchez Mejía; Juan Pablo Ambris; Mariano Diluch
- Editors: Ramiro Pardo; Marcos González; Rigel Sosa Andrade; Francisco Nogueras; Horacio Valle; Cheryl Sanchez; Carlos Leal
- Camera setup: Multi-camera
- Production companies: Argos Comunicación; Telemundo Global Studios

Original release
- Network: Telemundo
- Release: 23 September 2014 – 29 January 2019

Señora Acero, also known as Señora Acero: La Coyote as of season three, is an American telenovela created by Roberto Stopello and produced by Argos Comunicación and Telemundo Studios, and distributed by Telemundo Internacional. The series debuted on American broadcast channel Telemundo on 23 September 2014, and concluded on 29 January 2019.

Set and filmed in Mexico, Seasons 1 and 2 tell the story of Sara Aguilar (Blanca Soto), a young housewife, who in an effort to protect her son and her friends, becomes the most powerful drug trafficker in all of Mexico. Seasons 3 through 5 focus on the life of Vicenta "La Coyote" Rigores (Carolina Miranda), a young female coyote who discovers that she is the illegitimate daughter of Vicente Acero and joins the world of drug traffickers along with her half-brother Salvador Acero (Michel Duval) to help immigrants and fight injustice.

On 20 February 2018, Telemundo confirmed that the show was renewed for a fifth season. On 8 November 2018, it was announced that the fifth season would be the show's final season.

== Series overview ==
Series	Episodes	Originally released	
Series	Episodes	First released	Last released
1	73	23 September 2014	12 January 2015
2	75	22 September 2015	11 January 2016
3	93	19 July 2016	5 December 2016
4	77	6 November 2017	20 February 2018
5	69	15 October 2018	29 January 2019

The first two seasons follow the life of Sara Aguilar Bermúdez (Blanca Soto), an exceptionally happy woman who has all she could wish for in life, although her life changes forever when her fiancée Vicente Acero (Damián Alcázar) is killed on their wedding day. After the petitions of their seven year-old son, Salvador, the couple is set to marry when a group of hitmen attacks the wedding and murders Vicente. Sara is forced to confront that Vicente was not who she believed. Sara and her son flee from the enemies of her deceased husband and attempt to survive. In the process, Sara becomes the great "Señora de Acero" in order to exact revenge on all those who have hurt her and her son.

In season two, after serving five years in prison, Sara hopes to be released on a lack of evidence. However, the president of Mexico sentences Sara to 25 years in prison at the request of his private secretary Berta Aguilar (Luciana Silveyra). The hatred of a resentful sister, the political ambitions of a corrupt president, and other twists of destiny cause Señora Acero to fall into the hands of her mortal enemy, El Teca Martinez. For the second time, Sara must say goodbye to her son, Salvador (Michel Duval) and the great love of her lie, Manuel Caicedo (Lincoln Palomeque).

Season three, takes place three years after Sara and Teca death. It tells the story of Vicenta "La Coyote" Rigores (Carolina Miranda), one of the most courageous, respected and feared coyotes on the border between Mexico and the United States. In significant demand by migrants seeking to cross the border, Vicenta is one of the most famous and feared women in northern Mexico, with a reputation for protecting migrants with her life from capture by immigration officials, as well as cartels who use migrants as slaves in the production and distribution of drugs. Vicenta is also one of the most wanted women by Homeland Security, particularly by officer Daniel Phillips (Luis Ernesto Franco), and other coyotes, who are threatened by her dominance in the business.

La Coyote does not know her true parentage until her mother, on her deathbed, reveals that she is the illegitimate daughter of narco and former commander Vicente Acero, and half-sister of Salvador, who is presumed to be the sole heir of the Acero dynasty. Vicenta's journey is complicated by Governor of Chihuahua, Chucho Casares (Sergio Goyri), who is her mother's murderer and one of the heads of the most powerful arms trafficking rings in northern Mexico. Casares is also the father of Abelardo (Adrián Di Monte), the love of Vicenta's life. For La Coyote, the last name of Acero could be her salvation or her death sentence, but what is clear is that she is the only, and the second, Señora Acero.

In season four, Vicenta Acero is wanted by the governments of Mexico and the United States as her family is the main suspect in the death of Governor Chucho Casáres. Vicenta's brother Salvador is taken to jail after leaving the hotel wher ehe was hiding. Vicenta and Daniel are followed by the head of the Department of National Security, Indira Cárdenas (Gaby Espino), and the border patrol of the state of Texas in an attempt to prevent the pair from continuing to cross immigrants at the border. In addition, Colombian drug trafficker Julián Romero (Diego Cadavid) arrives in Mexico to avenge the death of his relatives and his mother, Briceida Montero. Julián is obsessed with finding Vicenta to exact his revenge against Salvador and El Gallo (Óscar Priego).

In season five, Vicenta Acero (Carolina Miranda), who is eight months pregnant when must bury her husband Daniel who has died after six months in a coma. During Daniel's funeral, Vicenta communicates anonymously with FBI agent Alberto Fuentes (David Chocarro) to inform him that her husband's murderer is at the funeral. After tracing the call, Alberto arrives at the funeral and realizes that it was a false alarm. During an argument, Vicenta begins showing signs of labor and gives birth with Alberto assisting her. Alberto develops a deep bond with Vicenta's son.

Six years later, the Acero family has left behind their life of money laundering, drug trafficking, and migrant crossing and have dedicated themselves to horse breeding, with El Gallo and Josefina dedicated to politics. El Teca (William Miller), who supposedly died at the hands of Salvador Acero (Michel Duval) 5 years ago, returns after spending six years in a United States prison to get revenge on the Acero family by killing Vicenta's son. With the reappearance of Teca, the family is forced to flee their calm and isolated life. Vicenta makes the difficult decision to flee her new life and new love with her child. She meets Lucas Iglesias (Guillermo Zulueta), a hippie who gives her repose in a beachside inn where he works. Vicenta meets La Mecha (María Rojo) who becomes a surrogate mother for Vicenta, and Nancy (Patricia Manterola)), who becomes her best friend.

La Tuti (Ana Lucía Domínguez) owns a club for exotic dancers and, thanks to the success of the business, has managed to keep her son out of Mexico, although she must always be accompanied by bodyguards to avoid being extorted and her son, Álvaro, being kidnapped by El Teca. In an effort to defend their children, Vicenta and La Tuti join forces to stop El Teca.

== Cast and characters ==
- Blanca Soto as Sara Aguilar (seasons 1–2)
- Litzy as Aracely Paniagua (seasons 1–3)
- Damián Alcázar as Vicente Acero (season 1; stand-in season 3) (Note: Despite only appearing in a few episodes in individual seasons, is credited as main.) (Note: In season 3, Alcázar only appears as archive footage, but in some episodes another unknown actor appears playing the character.)
- Marco Pérez as Felipe Murillo (season 1)
- Jorge Zárate as El Indio Amaro (seasons 1–4)
- Rossana San Juan as Mariana Huerdo (season 1)
- Andrés Palacios as Eliodoro Flores Tarso (season 1)
- Rebecca Jones as Enriqueta Sabido (season 1)
- José Luis Reséndez as El Teca (seasons 1–2; guest season 4)
- William Miller as El Teca (season 5)
- Lincoln Palomeque as Manuel Caicedo (seasons 1–3)
- Alejandro Calva as Miguel Quintanilla (season 1; recurring, season 2; main)
- Carolina Miranda as Vicenta Acero (seasons 3–5)
- Luis Ernesto Franco as Daniel Phillips (seasons 3–4)
- Sergio Goyri as Chucho Casáres (season 3)
- Laura Flores as Edelmira Rigores (season 3)
- José María Torre as El Cheneque (season 3)
- Ana Lucía Domínguez as La Tuti (season 2; recurring, seasons 3–5)
- Gaby Espino as Indira Cárdenas (seasons 3-4) (Note: Despite being accredited at the end of the credits, it has a special mention and is accredited by the sources as the protagonist.)
- Diego Cadavid as Julián Montero (seasons 4–5)
- David Chocarro as Alberto Fuentes (season 5)
- Paulina Gaitán as Leticia Moreno (season 5)
- Mauricio Islas as Hector Ruiz (season 5)
- Dagoberto Gama as Juan Ramon (season 5)
- Maria Rojo as Mercedes Berríos / La Mecha (season 5)

== Ratings ==
Viewership and ratings per season of Señora Acero
Season	Episodes	First aired		Last aired		Avg. viewers (millions)
Season	Episodes	Date	Viewers (millions)	Date	Viewers (millions)	Avg. viewers (millions)
1	74	23 September 2014	TBD	12 January 2015	2.76	TBD
2	75	22 September 2015	2.43	11 January 2016	2.65	TBD
3	93	19 July 2016	TBD	5 December 2016	TBD	TBD
4	73 (Note: Should reflect the number of episodes that contribute to the average given in the last column.)	6 November 2017	1.77	20 February 2018	1.84	1.37
5	69	15 October 2018	1.39	29 January 2019	1.23	1.04

== Background ==
Sandra Echeverría was originally planned to star, but Blanca Soto was selected to play protagonist Sara Aguilar. The original title of the telenovela was tentatively "Mujer de Acero" but was later changed to "Señora Acero".

Blanca Soto departed from the series after season two. Carolina Miranda replaced Soto as the main protagonist and series title character in season three.

== Music ==
Track listing

No.	Title	Length
1.	"La Señora de Acero (Note: Main theme of season one.)" (Los Tucanes de Tijuana)	5:33
2.	"La venganza de Sarita (Note: Main theme of season two.)" (Los Tucanes de Tijuana)	4:33
3.	"La Coyote (Note: Main theme of season three.)" (Los Tucanes de Tijuana)	5:35
4.	"La justiciera de la frontera (Note: Main theme of season four.)" (Los Tucanes de Tijuana)	5:36
5.	"Yo no pienso volver" (Litzy)	(Note: This song was never released in a single format, it was only created for the series and only small parts are heard.)

== Awards and nominations ==
Year	Award	Category	Nominated	Result
2014	People en Español	Best Actress	Blanca Soto	Nominated
2014	People en Español	Galanazo del año	Andrés Palacios	Nominated
2014	People en Español	Best on-screen chemistry	Blanca Soto and Andrés Palacios	Nominated
2014	People en Español	Best telenovela	Señora Acero	Nominated
2014	People en Español	Best Female Antagonist	Rebecca Jones	Nominated
2014	People en Español	Best Male Antagonist	Jorge Zárate	Nominated
2015	Premios Tu Mundo	The Best Actor with Bad Luck	Blanca Soto	Nominated
2015	Premios Tu Mundo	First Actress	Rebecca Jones	Nominated
2015	Premios Tu Mundo	First Actor	Damián Alcázar	Nominated
2015	Premios Tu Mundo	Súper Serie of the Year	Señora Acero	Nominated
2015	Premios Tu Mundo	Favorite Lead Actor: Súper Series	Andrés Palacios	Nominated
2015	Premios Tu Mundo	Favorite Lead Actress: Súper Series	Blanca Soto	Nominated
2015	Premios Tu Mundo	The Best Bad Boy: Series	José Luis Reséndez	Nominated
2015	Premios Tu Mundo	The Best Bad Girl: Series	Luciana Silveyra	Nominated
2015	Premios Tu Mundo	Best Supporting Actress: Series	Litzy	Nominated
2015	Premios Tu Mundo	Best Supporting Actor: Series	Arturo Barba	Nominated
2015	Premios Tu Mundo	Best Supporting Actor: Series	Jorge Zárate	Nominated
2016	Miami Life Awards	Best Female Lead in a Telenovela	Blanca Soto	Nominated
2016	Miami Life Awards	Best Male Lead in a Telenovela	José Luis Reséndez	Nominated
2016	Miami Life Awards	Best Supporting Actor in a Telenovela	Mauricio Henao	Nominated
2016	Miami Life Awards	Best Supporting Actress in a Telenovela	Rossana San Juan	Nominated
2016	Miami Life Awards	Best telenovela	Señora Acero	Nominated
2016	Premios Tu Mundo	Súper Serie of the Year	Señora Acero	Nominated
2016	Premios Tu Mundo	Favorite Lead Actress: Súper Series	Blanca Soto	Nominated
2016	Premios Tu Mundo	Favorite Lead Actor: Súper Series	José Luis Reséndez	Nominated
2016	Premios Tu Mundo	The Best Bad Girl: Súper Series	Luciana Silveyra	Nominated
2016	Premios Tu Mundo	The Best Bad Boy: Súper Series	Rodrigo Guirao	Won
2016	Premios Tu Mundo	The Best Bad Boy: Súper Series	Jorge Zárate	Nominated
2016	Premios Tu Mundo	Favorite Actress	Ana Lucía Domínguez	Nominated
2016	Premios Tu Mundo	Favorite Actress	Aurora Gil	Nominated
2016	Premios Tu Mundo	Favorite Actress	Litzy	Nominated
2016	Premios Tu Mundo	Favorite Actor	Lincoln Palomeque	Won
2016	Premios Tu Mundo	Favorite Actor	Mauricio Henao	Nominated
2016	Premios Tu Mundo	The Perfect Couple: Súper Series	Blanca Soto and Lincoln Palomeque	Nominated
2016	Premios Tu Mundo	The Perfect Couple: Súper Series	Litzy and Rodrigo Guirao	Nominated
2016	Premios Tu Mundo	Revelation of the Year	Michel Duval	Nominated
2017	Your World Awards	Favorite Súper Series	Señora Acero	Nominated
2017	Your World Awards	Favorite Lead Actor	Luis Ernesto Franco	Nominated
2017	Your World Awards	Favorite Lead Actress	Carolina Miranda	Nominated
2017	Your World Awards	The Best Bad Boy	José María Torre	Nominated
2017	Your World Awards	The Best Bad Girl	Gaby Espino	Nominated
2017	Your World Awards	Favorite Actor	Michel Duval	Nominated
2017	Your World Awards	The Perfect Couple	Luis Ernesto Franco and Carolina Miranda	Nominated
2017	Your World Awards	Soy Sexy And I Know It	Ana Lucía Domínguez	Nominated
2017	Your World Awards	Soy Sexy And I Know It	Michel Duval	Nominated
