= Carolina Miranda (actress) =

Mexican television actress (born 1990)

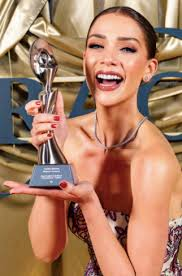
- Born: Carolina Miranda Olvera; June 25, 1989 (age 37); Irapuato, Guanajuato, Mexico
- Occupation: Actress
- Years active: 2012–present
- Notable work: ¿Quién mató a Sara?, Fake Profile
- Partner: Juan Felipe Samper

Carolina Miranda Olvera (born June 25, 1989, in Irapuato, Guanajuato, Mexico) is a Mexican actress. She debuted in the TV Azteca telenovelas Los Rey and Las Bravo. From 2016 to 2019, Miranda starred in the hit Telemundo action drama Señora Acero in the role of Vicenta.

== Filmography ==
Film roles
Year	Title	Roles
2023	Infelices para siempre	Bicha
2024	Todas menos tú	Gaby
2025	El hilo rojo	Abril
2025	Borrón y vida nueva	Priscila

Television roles
Year	Title	Roles	Notes
2012–2013	Los Rey	Delfina Rey Ortuña "Fina"	Main cast
2014–2015	Las Bravo	Carmen Bravo	Main cast
2016–2019	Señora Acero	Vicenta Acero / Vicenta Rigores	Lead role (seasons 3–5); 239 episodes
2016	Un día cualquiera	Annette / Liliana Marilupe	Episode: "Gemelos" Episode: "El órgano reproductor masculino"
2017	Lo que callamos las mujeres		
2018	Heredadas	Sofía	Episode: "Alma, vida y corazón"
2019	Claramente	Clara	Lead role; 12 episodes
2019	Dani Who?	Lluvia	Episode: "Answers"
2021	¿Quién mató a Sara?	Elisa Lazcano	Main cast
2021–2022	Malverde: El Santo Patrón	Isabel Aguilar	Lead role
2022	La mujer del diablo	Natalia Vallejo	Lead role
2023–2026	Fake Profile	Camila Román	Lead role
2023	Tierra de esperanza	María Teresa Arteaga	Lead role
2024	Mujeres asesinas	Esmeralda	Episode: "Esmeralda"
2025	Velvet: El nuevo imperio	Cristina Otegui	Main cast
2026	Los encantos del sinvergüenza	Alma	Main cast

== Awards and nominations ==
Year	Association	Category	Work	Result	Ref.
2017	Your World Awards	Favorite Lead Actress	Señora Acero	Nominated	
2017	Produ Awards	Best Newcomer Actress - Series, Superseries or Telenovela of the Year	Señora Acero	Won	
2021	Produ Awards	Best Lead Actress - Series or Miniseries	Who Killed Sara?	Nominated	
2022	Produ Awards	Best Lead Actress - Superseries or Telenovela	Malverde: El Santo Patrón	Nominated	
2023	Produ Awards	Best Lead Actress - Series or Miniseries	Fake Profile	Nominated	
2024	Septimius Awards	Best American Actress	Fake Profile	Nominated	
2024	Produ Awards	Best Lead Actress - Short Telenovela	Tierra de esperanza	Nominated	
2025	Gracie Awards	Non-English Individual Achievement, Actress	Mujeres asesinas	Won	
2025	Produ Awards	Best Actress in a Romantic Drama Series	Fake Profile	Nominated	
2025	Produ Awards	Best Actress in a Film Released on a Streaming Platform	El hilo rojo	Nominated	
2025	International Emmy Awards	International Emmy Award for Best Actress	Mujeres asesinas	Nominated	
