= Los encantos del sinvergüenza =

- Genre: Thriller; Comedy drama
- Based on: Memorias de un sinvergüenza de siete suelas by Ángela Becerra
- Developed by: Rosa Clemente
- Written by: Rosa Clemente; Fernanda Fuentes; Raúl Prieto; Daniel Damuzi; Daniel Yépes; Connie Acosta; Ivonne Prieto
- Directed by: Sergio Osorio
- Starring: Manolo Cardona; Carolina Miranda; Erick Elías; Daniela Álvarez
- Country of origin: Mexico
- Original language: Spanish
- No. of seasons: 1
- No. of episodes: 20

Production
- Executive producers: Juancho Cardona; Manolo Cardona; Patricio Wills
- Producers: Mariana Zubillaga; Julye Cuartas Varela
- Cinematography: Lucho Otero
- Editor: Alejo Alas
- Camera setup: Multi-camera
- Production companies: 11:11 Films; W Studios

Original release
- Network: Vix
- Release: 24 April – 1 May 2026

Los encantos del sinvergüenza is a Mexican thriller comedy drama television series that premiered on Vix on 24 April 2026. It is an adaptation of the 2013 novel Memorias de un sinvergüenza de siete suelas by Ángela Becerra. The series stars Manolo Cardona, Carolina Miranda, Erick Elías and Daniela Álvarez.

== Cast ==
=== Main ===
- Manolo Cardona as Francisco Valiente
- Carolina Miranda as Alma
- Erick Elías as Bernardo
- Daniela Álvarez as Morgana
- Roberto Duarte
- Odiseo Bichir
- Silverio Palacios
- Carmen Beato
- Alfonso Borbolla
- Patricia Bernal

=== Recurring and guest stars ===
- Lisa Owen
- María Elisa Camargo
- Elena Medina as Lucía
- Javier Delguidice as Jacinto
- Michelle Olvera as Macarena
- Ian Couttolenc as Paco
- Juliana Gil as Cecilia
- Juan Felipe Samper as Antonio
- Mauricio Cujar as Carlos Ocaña
- Laura Osma as Carmen Balam
- Cielo Anais as Alicia
- Carolina Serrano as Natalia
- Tania Valencia as Tatiana
- Salomé García as Lupita
- Norberto Rivera as Faustino
- Ioulia Pakhomov as Irina
- Paul Choza as Artemio
- Natalia Guevara as Esmeralda
- Gina Parra as Patricia

== Episodes ==
No.	Title	Original release date
1	"La noche que Valiente llegó y se fue"	24 April 2026
2	"Lecciones de tres damas"	24 April 2026
3	"Duelo en el club"	24 April 2026
4	"Infieles anónimos"	24 April 2026
5	"Pacto con del diablo"	24 April 2026
6	"¿Dónde está Valiente?"	1 May 2026
7	"Agridulce adiós"	1 May 2026
8	"El regreso del Sinvergüenza"	1 May 2026
9	"Bodas de cadenas"	1 May 2026
10	"Amor diplomático"	1 May 2026
11	"El pequeño Francisco"	1 May 2026
12	"El amor o la vida"	1 May 2026
13	"A 200 metros de ti"	1 May 2026
14	"El enloquecido Bernardo"	1 May 2026
15	"La bala y la verdad"	1 May 2026
16	"Hijos del engaño"	1 May 2026
17	"El secreto de Morgana"	1 May 2026
18	"Escape a la verdad"	1 May 2026
19	"Una última jugada"	1 May 2026
20	"Hasta que la muerte..."	1 May 2026
