= Lalola (Mexican TV series) =

- Genre: Comedy drama
- Based on: Lalola by Sebastián Ortega
- Directed by: Francisco Franco Alba; Ana Lorena Pérez Ríos
- Starring: Bárbara de Regil; Diego Amozurrutia; Gonzalo García Vivanco; Alejandro de la Madrid; Cynthia Klitbo; Alexis Ayala; Carmen Madrid; Francisca Aronsson
- Composers: Manuel Vázquez; Andrés Penella
- Country of origin: Mexico
- Original language: Spanish
- No. of seasons: 2
- No. of episodes: 19

Production
- Executive producers: Joshua Mintz; Ana Celia Urquidi; Nadav Palti; Tami Mosez; Paul Drago; Moisés Dayan; Francisco Franco Alba
- Producer: Mónica Skorlich
- Production company: Dori Media International

Original release
- Network: Vix
- Release: 2 February 2024

Lalola is a Mexican comedy drama streaming television series based on the 2007 Argentine telenovela of the same name, created by Sebastián Ortega. The series stars Bárbara de Regil and Alejandro de la Madrid. It premiered on Vix on 2 February 2024. The second season premiered on 8 November 2024. Soon after the second season premiered, the show was cancelled.

== Cast ==
=== Main ===
- Bárbara de Regil as Lola
- Diego Amozurrutia as Lalo
- Gonzalo García Vivanco as Facundo
- Alejandro de la Madrid as Gastón
- Cynthia Klitbo as Cirse
- Alexis Ayala as Aguirre
- Carmen Madrid as Sonia
- Francisca Aronsson as Soledad

=== Recurring and guest stars ===
- Alfonso Borbolla as Dédalus
- Epy Velez as Alexa
- Pamela Almanza as Natalia
- Lumi Cavazos as Carola
- Majo Pérez as Vicky
- Adriana Montes de Oca as Romina
- Christopher Aguilasocho as Martín
- Anzhela Perepichka as Samantha
- Octavio Vega as Don Antonio
- Josechu Garrido as Xshimena
- Daniel Vega as Marco
- Sergio Maya as Wences
- Alejandro Calva
- Maru Bravo

== Production ==
Filming of Lalola began on 5 May 2023 and concluded on 30 June 2023. The series is produced by Dori Media International. On 10 January 2024, Vix released the first teaser for the series.

== Episodes ==
Season	Episodes	Originally released
1	9	2 February 2024
2	10	8 November 2024

=== Season 1 (2024) ===
No. overall	No. in season	Title	Original release date
1	1	"Una exageración"	2 February 2024
2	2	"Aceptar o no aceptar"	2 February 2024
3	3	"Denlo por muerto"	2 February 2024
4	4	"Fuera de lugar"	2 February 2024
5	5	"El diván de Lola"	2 February 2024
6	6	"Siempre Lola"	2 February 2024
7	7	"Manos a la obra"	2 February 2024
8	8	"Mi primera vez"	2 February 2024
9	9	"Esto apenas empieza"	2 February 2024

=== Season 2 (2024) ===
No. overall	No. in season	Title	Original release date
10	1	"Un amor sincero"	8 November 2024
11	2	"El amor es cosa de dos"	8 November 2024
12	3	"Contrato de amor"	8 November 2024
13	4	"Tocarse"	8 November 2024
14	5	"Obsidiana"	8 November 2024
15	6	"Estaba escrito que aquella noche perdiera su amor"	8 November 2024
16	7	"Efímera ilusión"	8 November 2024
17	8	"Vivir tiene sus riesgos"	8 November 2024
18	9	"Riesgo de lo desconocido"	8 November 2024
19	10	"Mariposas o riesgo en la profecía"	8 November 2024

== Release ==
The series premiered on Vix on 2 February 2024. The series made its broadcast television premiere on Univision on 3 August 2024. The second season was released on 8 November 2024.

== Awards and nominations ==
Year	Award	Category	Nominated	Result	Ref
2024	Produ Awards	Best Romantic Comedy Series	Lalola	Nominated	
2024	Produ Awards	Best Lead Actress - Romantic Comedy Series and Miniseries	Bárbara de Regil	Won	
2024	Premios Aura	Highest Impact Television Series	Lalola	Nominated	
2025	Produ Awards	Best Dramedy Series	Lalola	Pending	
2025	Produ Awards	Best Lead Actress - Dramedy Series	Bárbara de Regil	Pending	
2025	Produ Awards	Best Lead Actor - Dramedy Series	Alejandro de la Madrid	Pending	
