= FMN =

FMN may refer to:

- Federated Mission Networking
- Facial motor nucleus
- Flavin mononucleotide
- Flour Mills of Nigeria, a Nigerian agribusiness company
- FMN (TV channel), Indonesia
- Formins
- The FAA LID/IATA code for Four Corners Regional Airport in Farmington, New Mexico, United States
- Ministry of Defence (Denmark) (Danish: Forsvarsministeriet)
- Narrowband FM, or frequency modulation narrow
