= Fake Profile =

Colombian drama streaming television series

- Promotional poster
- Spanish: Perfil falso
- Genre: Drama
- Created by: Pablo Illanes
- Written by: Pablo Illanes; Fernanda Lema; Mauricio López
- Directed by: Klych Lopéz; Catalina Hernández
- Starring: Carolina Miranda; Rodolfo Salas
- Country of origin: Colombia
- Original language: Spanish
- No. of seasons: 3
- No. of episodes: 30

Production
- Executive producers: Federico Castillo; Silvia Durán; Cristina Echeverri
- Producer: Halía Hincapie
- Production locations: Cartagena; Las Vegas
- Editor: Camilo Escobar
- Camera setup: Multi-camera
- Running time: 35-45 minutes
- Production company: TIS Productions

Original release
- Network: Netflix
- Release: 31 May 2023 – 15 April 2026

Fake Profile (Spanish: Perfil falso) is a Colombian erotic drama streaming television series created by Pablo Illanes. It is produced by TIS Productions for Netflix. The series premiered on 31 May 2023. The series stars Carolina Miranda and Rodolfo Salas.

On 13 June 2023, the series was renewed for a second season, subtitled Killer Match, that premiered on 8 January 2025. On 31 July 2025, the series was renewed for a third and final season, that premiered on 15 April 2026.

== Cast ==
- Carolina Miranada as Camila Román
- Rodolfo Salas as Miguel Estévez / Fernando Castell
- Manuela González as Ángela Ferrer
- Víctor Mallarino as Pedro Ferrer
- Mauricio Henao as Adrián Ferrer
- Lincoln Palomeque as David
- Felipe Londoño as Cristóbal Balboa
- Juliana Galvis as Tina
- Nicole Santamaría as Milenka
- Iván Amozurrutia as Vicente
- Julián Cañeque Cerati as Inti
- Juan Pablo Posada as Luigi
- María Luisa Flores as Sofía
- Maria Paula Veloza as Eva Estévez
- Juanse Diez as Lucas Estévez
- Carmenza Gómez as Hortensia
- Fernando Velazquez as Luis Manrique

== Episodes ==
Season	Episodes	Originally released
1	10	31 May 2023
2	10	8 January 2025

=== Season 1 (2023) ===
No. overall	No. in season	Title	Original release date
1	1	"Flesh and Bone" "En carne y hueso"	31 May 2023
2	2	"Panic in Paradise" "Pánico en el paraíso"	31 May 2023
3	3	"Even If It Hurts" "Aunque duela"	31 May 2023
4	4	"Breathless" "Sin aliento"	31 May 2023
5	5	"Dangerous Images" "Imágenes peligrosas"	31 May 2023
6	6	"Red Velvet's Secret" "El secreto de Red Velvet"	31 May 2023
7	7	"Inside the Wolf's Mouth" "La boca del lobo"	31 May 2023
8	8	"Temptation in the Dark" "Tentación en la oscuridad"	31 May 2023
9	9	"Night of the Executioners" "La noche de los ejecutores"	31 May 2023
10	10	"Don't Say Anything" "No digas nada"	31 May 2023

=== Season 2: Killer Match (2025) ===
No. overall	No. in season	Title	Original release date
11	1	"The Forbidden Dream" "El sueño prohibido"	8 January 2025
12	2	"Losing Control" "Perder el control"	8 January 2025
13	3	"Anatomy of an Obsession" "Anatomía de una obsesión"	8 January 2025
14	4	"The Man That Never Was" "El hombre que nunca existió"	8 January 2025
15	5	"Pleasure's Edge" "Al filo del placer"	8 January 2025
16	6	"The Girl Who Knew Too Much" "La chica que sabía demasiado"	8 January 2025
17	7	"He/She Knows You're Alone" "Ella/Él sabe que estás sola"	8 January 2025
18	8	"What Eyes Can't See" "Ojos que no ven"	8 January 2025
19	9	"Death Playing Golf" "La muerte juega al golf"	8 January 2025
20	10	"Blood & Hope" "La sangre y la esperanza"	8 January 2025
