= Mujeres asesinas =

Mujeres Asesinas ("Killer Women") can mean:

- Mujeres asesinas (Argentine TV series), 2005
  - Mujeres asesinas (2008 TV series), based on the above, running from 2008 to 2010
    - Mujeres asesinas (2022 TV series), a reimagined version of the Mexican series
  - Killer Women, an American TV series based on the Argentine version
