= Unavoidable Girl =

Vietnamese television series

- Cô nàng bất đắc dĩ
- Directed by: Hồng Ngân; Xuân Cường
- Starring: Huy Khánh and Vũ Thu Phương
- Theme music composer: Minh Nhiên (music and lyrics)
- Opening theme: "Tình yêu thiên thần" by Kasim Hoàng Vũ
- Country of origin: Vietnam
- Original language: Vietnamese
- No. of episodes: 150 episodes

Production
- Production locations: Ho Chi Minh City, Vietnam
- Running time: 45 minutes
- Production companies: Kiết Tường; VTV

Original release
- Release: July 6, 2009

Related
- Lalola

Cô nàng bất đắc dĩ (Unavoidable Girl) is a Vietnamese television series, shown first on VTV3 channel. This movie bought the rights from the film adaptation of Argentina - Lalola.
