= Comedy Smart =

- Country: Turkey
- Broadcast area: Turkey

Programming
- Picture format: 4:3 (576i, SDTV)

Links
- Website: http://www.dsmart.com.tr/channeldetail.aspx?channelid=14

Comedy Smart is a television channel in Turkey, which broadcasts worldwide hit TV comedy series as Turkish dubbed. It is exclusively available for D-Smart satellite package owners.

== Shows ==
Some of the shows (previously) on Comedy Smart:

- 10 Items or Less
- Absolutely Fabulous
- Bakersfield P.D.
- Black Books
- Carpoolers
- Comedy Trap
- Coupling
- For Your Love
- George Lopez
- Good Morning Miami
- Grounded For Life
- Help Me Help You
- Jesse
- Just Shoot Me!
- Keeping Up Appearances
- Lalola
- Less than Perfect
- Life with Bonnie
- Manchild
- Miss Guided
- My Boys
- My Hero
- My Wife and Kids
- The Naked Truth
- Ned and Stacey
- NewsRadio
- Off Centre
- Off Prime
- The Omid Djalili Show
- Open House
- Police Academy
- Rodney
- Scrubs
- Sports Night
- Stark Raving Mad
- That '70s Show
- Titus
- Twins
- Vienna Calling
- The War at Home
- Whose Line Is It Anyway?
