= LaLola (Philippine TV series) =

Philippine television drama series

- Title card
- Genre: Comedy drama; Fantasy
- Based on: Lalola (2007) by Sebastián Ortega
- Developed by: Jun Lana
- Directed by: Dominic Zapata; Jun Lana
- Starring: Rhian Ramos; JC de Vera
- Narrated by: Keempee de Leon
- Theme music composer: Tats Faustino; Janno Gibbs
- Opening theme: "Ang Ganda Ganda ni Lola" by Janno Gibbs
- Ending theme: "Bakit?" by Kyla and Luke Mijares
- Country of origin: Philippines
- Original language: Tagalog
- No. of episodes: 85

Production
- Executive producer: Edlyn Tallada Abuel
- Producer: Wilma Galvante
- Production locations: Metro Manila, Philippines
- Camera setup: Multiple-camera setup
- Running time: 30–45 minutes
- Production company: GMA Entertainment TV

Original release
- Network: GMA Network
- Release: October 13, 2008 – February 6, 2009

LaLola is a Philippine television drama fantasy comedy series broadcast by GMA Network. The series is based on a 2007 Argentine television series of the same title. Directed by Dominic Zapata and Jun Lana, it stars Rhian Ramos and JC de Vera. It premiered on October 13, 2008 on the network's Telebabad line up. The series concluded on February 6, 2009, with a total of 85 episodes.

== Premise ==
Lazaro "Lalo" Lobregat is the president of Distelleria Lobregat. He is regarded as the metro's most eligible bachelor not to mention, a heartbreaker. He is a little bit insensitive about some things especially about the feelings of women. There is still a bit of conscience in him, but he is too preoccupied to notice his "inner good" because of his cool cars and hot chicks. But when his ex-fling Ada Romina killed herself because of him, everything in his perfect life will change. Sera Romina, Ada's sister is furious. All she knows is that he must pay. Unknown to Lalo, Sera and Ada are babaylans, magical beings that could conjure curses and spells with the power of the moon. With a cursed kiss from Sera, Lalo changes into a woman in a snap. Since nobody will believe his overnight sex change, except for his closet gay best friend Gary, he passes himself as Lola, Lalo's steady girlfriend, to which everyone has a hard time believing. With a new body, he finds out how hard it is to be a woman, experiencing the same chauvinism he used to inflict on women. With each passing day, every inch of Lalo starts to fade, physically and emotionally, and starts to develop real female characteristics like menstruation. As if that's not hard enough, she starts to develop feelings to Lalo's office mate and complete opposite, Facundo Diaz. He also discovers the deep dark secrets of Distelleria Lobregat and his identity, not to mention an angry babaylan magically trying to destroy her even more.

== Cast and characters ==
Cast

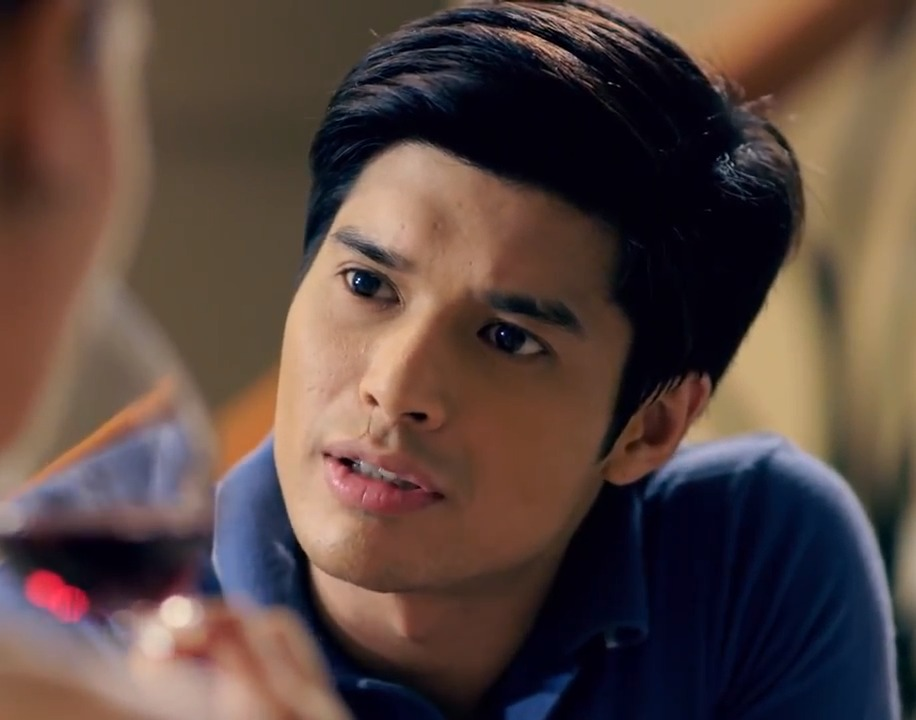
JC de Vera

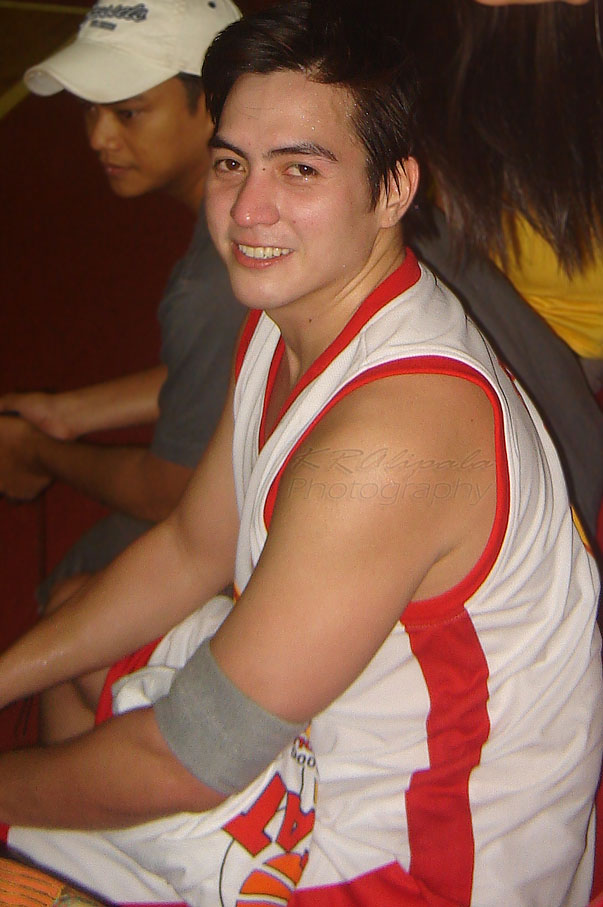
Wendell Ramos

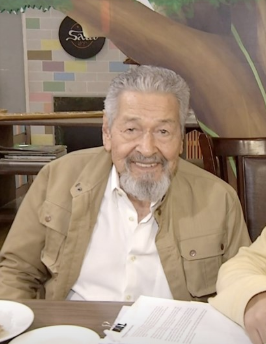
Eddie Garcia

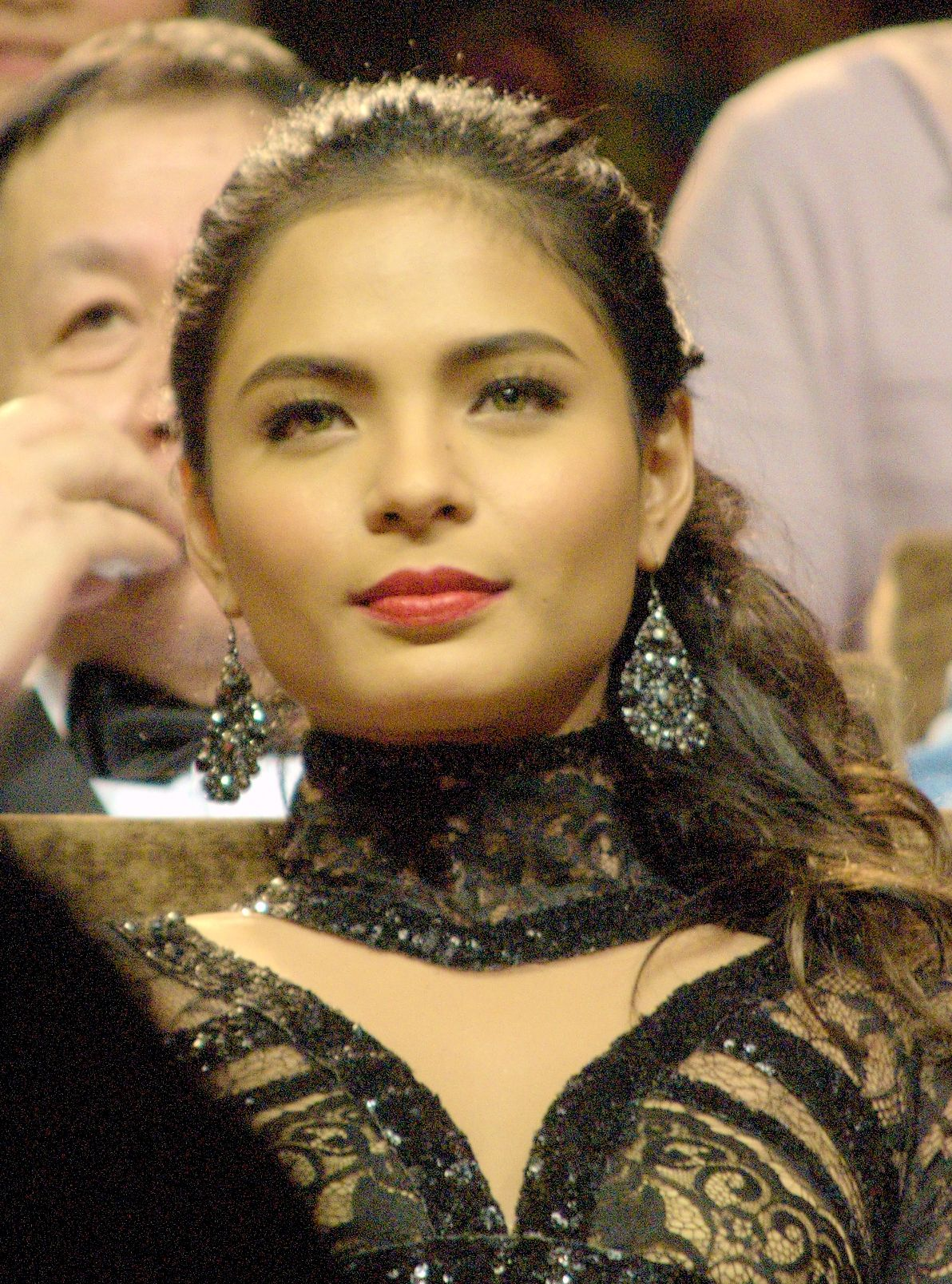
Lovi Poe

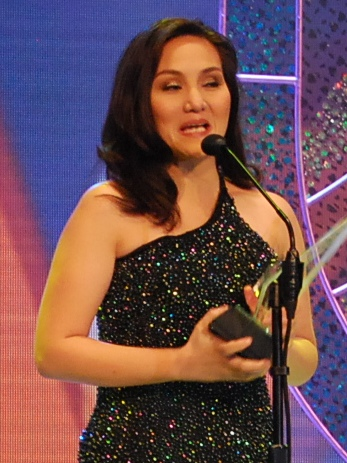
Gladys Reyes

Lead cast

- JC de Vera as Facundo Diaz
- Rhian Ramos as Lolita "Lola" P. Diaz

Supporting cast

- Eddie Garcia as Aguirre Lobregat
- Jackie Lou Blanco as Griselda Lobregat
- Marvin Agustin as Gaston S. Lobregat
- Angelika Dela Cruz as Sabrina Starr
- Sheena Halili as Vicky
- Wendell Ramos as Lazaro "Lalo" Lobregat
- Marky Cielo as Billy Lobregat
- Keempee de Leon as Graciano "Gary" T. Fuentebella
- Jay R as Pato
- Eula Valdez as Susanna F. Lobregat
- Lovi Poe as Julia Fuentebella
- Gladys Reyes as Iris Diaz
- Patricia Ysmael as Sera / Soledad
- Ana Capri as Oreng
- Yul Servo as Matias
- Isabel Granada as Tala Romina
- Melanie Marquez as Garganta

Guest cast

- Iza Calzado as Sera Romina
- Ian Veneracion as Emilio Lobregat
- Jewel Mische as Ada Romina

== Ratings ==
According to AGB Nielsen Philippines' Mega Manila household television ratings, the pilot episode of LaLola earned a 35.8% rating. The final episode scored a 40% rating.
