= FMN (TV channel) =

Indonesian TV channel

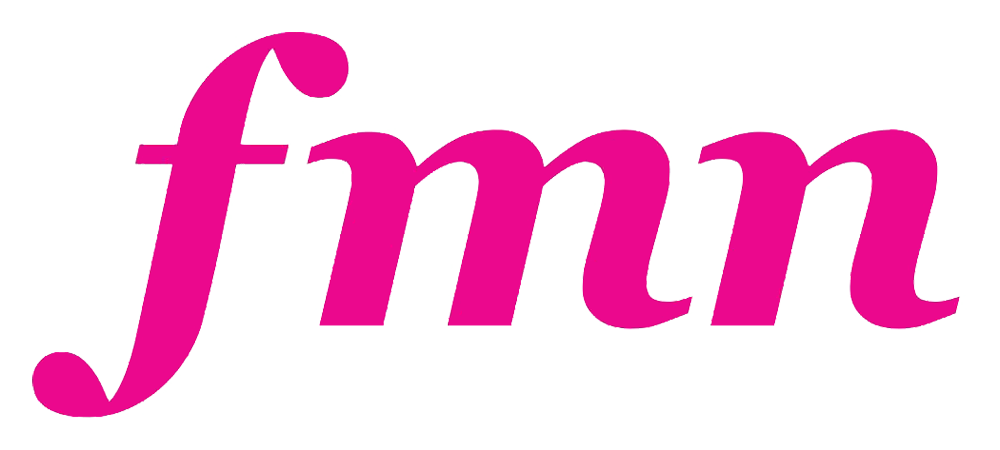

Ownership
- Owner: Dori Media Group; Sony Pictures Television
- Sister channels: Vision 3 Baby

History
- Launched: 2005
- Former names: Vision 2 Drama, Televiva

Links
- Website: http://www.indovision.tv

FMN, abbreviated from Forget Me Not, is a 24 hours teledrama channel, the first one in Indonesia, formerly known as Vision 2 Drama or Televiva. The channel was launched in 2005, and broadcast by MNC Vision. All programs are dubbed in Indonesian. Originally, the channel shows teledramas from Asia, Latin America, Korea and Taiwan, however, after rebranding as FMN, the channel now focuses on showing Latin American and Turkish teledramas. It is owned as a joint venture by Israeli company Dori Media Group and Sony Pictures Television.

== Television Dramas ==
=== 2005 ===
- Rincón de luz (Ended March 2005 - March 2006)
- La venganza (Ended June 2005 - January 2006)
- Topacio (Ended January 2005 - July 2005)
- Vale todo (Ended January 2005 - September 2005)
- Ángel rebelde (Ended August 2005 - March 2006)
- Aquamarina (Ended April 2005 - September 2005)
- La mujer de mi vida (Ended January 2005 - Oktober 2005)
- Guajira (Ended February 2005 - December 2005)
- Azul tequila (Ended July 2005 - December 2005)
- Gitanas (Ended September 2005 - April 2006)
- Enamorada (Ended January 2005 - April 2005)
- La mujer de Judas (Ended September 2005 - June 2006)

=== 2006 ===
- Machos (Ended March 2006 - October 2006)
- Gata salvaje (Ended February 2006 - February 2007)
- Esmeralda (Ended April 2006 - November 2006)

=== 2008 ===
- Lalola (Ended March 2008 - October 2008)
- Hamparan Cinta (July 2008 - September 2008)
- Gata salvaje (Ended November 2008 - November 2009)

=== 2011 ===
- Mariana & Scarlett

=== 2012 ===
- Victoria
- What is Fatmagul's Fault?

=== 2013 ===
- Triunfo del amor

=== 2014 ===
- Beijing Love Story
