= Claramente =

Mexican comedy web television series

- Genre: Comedy
- Directed by: Gaby Tagliavini; Alfonso Pineda Ulloa
- Starring: Carolina Miranda; Alejandro de la Madrid
- Country of origin: Mexico
- Original language: Spanish
- No. of seasons: 1
- No. of episodes: 12

Production
- Executive producers: Juancho Cardona; Manolo Cardona
- Production companies: 11:11 Films; Punta Fina

Original release
- Network: Claro Video
- Release: 14 November 2019

Claramente is a Mexican comedy web television series co-produced by 11:11 Films and Claro Video. The series is produced by Juancho and Manolo Cardona, and it premiered via streaming on 14 November 2019. It stars Carolina Miranda, and Alejandro de la Madrid. The plot revolves around a group of people who work together in an old-fashioned magazine in which different generations converge, with conflicts of all kinds.

== Plot ==
Claramente revolves around Clara (Carolina Miranda), a journalist with a very peculiar gift: she can read the minds of men. However, this particular condition is an impediment for her to find love. But everything changes when she meets Emiliano (Alejandro de la Madrid), the only man she whose thoughts she cannot read.

== Cast ==
- Carolina Miranda as Clara
- Alejandro de la Madrid as Emiliano
- Otto Sirgo as Lázaro
- Silvia Mariscal as Matilde
- Laura Vieira as Gaby
- Adriana Montes de Oca as Eleanora
- Arturo Caslo as Pablo
- Tamara Vallarta as Giuseppina
