= La mujer del diablo =

Mexican television series

- Genre: Drama
- Created by: Leonardo Padrón
- Written by: Christian Jiménez; Doris Segui; Carlos Eloy Castro; Leonardo Padrón; Karla Sainz de la Peña Alcocer
- Directed by: Carlos Andrés Cock Marín
- Starring: Carolina Miranda; José Ron; Adriana Louvier; José Pablo Minor; Mónica Dionne; Alejandro Calva; Samadhi Zendejas; Jonathan Islas; Azul Guaita; Ariana Saavedra; Sofía Lama; Marco Tostado
- Composer: Oskar Gritten
- Country of origin: Mexico
- Original language: Spanish
- No. of seasons: 3
- No. of episodes: 26

Production
- Executive producers: Patricio Wills; Carlos Bardasano
- Producer: Carmen Cecilia Urbaneja Llamozas
- Editor: Alba Merchán Hamann
- Camera setup: Multi-camera
- Production companies: W Studios; TelevisaUnivision

Original release
- Network: Vix+
- Release: 21 July 2022 – 6 January 2023

La mujer del diablo is a Mexican streaming television series produced by W Studios for TelevisaUnivision. It premiered on the streaming service Vix+ on 21 July 2022. The series stars Carolina Miranda and José Ron. The third and final season premiered on 6 January 2023.

== Plot ==
Natalia Vallejo (Carolina Miranda) is an elementary school teacher who wants to leave her town to dedicate herself to the tourism industry. Cristo Beltran (José Ron) is a high-ranking criminal who pretends to be the benefactor of those in need. Cristo becomes obsessed with Natalia regardless of the fact that she is in love with another man, doing the unimaginable to win her over.

== Cast ==
=== Main ===
- Carolina Miranda as Natalia Vallejo
- José Ron as Cristo Beltrán
- Adriana Louvier as Soledad Insulza
- José Pablo Minor as Diego Carvajal
- Mónica Dionne as Cayetana de Vallejo
- Alejandro Calva as Jonás
- Samadhi Zendejas as Candela
- Jonathan Islas as Mateo Carvajal
- Azul Guaita as Daniela Beltrán
- Ariana Saavedra as Linda Peña
- Sofía Lama as Patricia Alcántara
- Marco Tostado as Father Lázaro Beltrán

=== Recurring and guest stars ===
- Rodolfo Arias as Porfirio
- Aléx Perea as Cachorro
- Mauricio Pimentel as Tecolote
- Irineo Álvarez as Felipe
- Adriana Focke as Maruja
- Martín Rojas as Honorio
- José Carlos Femat as Sánchez
- Kiara Liz as Rosita
- Gabriela Carrillo as Clemencia
- Arianne Pellicer as Malena
- María de la Fuente as Isabel
- Ianis Guerrero as Tarazona
- Diego Escalona as Rodrigo
- Epy Vélez as Lupita

== Episodes ==
=== Series overview ===
Series	Episodes	Originally released
1	8	21 July 2022
2	8	18 October 2022
3	10	6 January 2023

=== Season 1 (2022) ===
No. overall	No. in season	Title	Original release date
1	1	"Secuestro"	21 July 2022
2	2	"Violencia contra la violencia"	21 July 2022
3	3	"Fuga frustrada"	21 July 2022
4	4	"Sólo por voluntad"	21 July 2022
5	5	"Presentación pública"	21 July 2022
6	6	"Sacrificio"	21 July 2022
7	7	"Impulsados por la pasión"	21 July 2022
8	8	"Ataque a una boda"	21 July 2022

=== Season 2 (2022) ===
No. overall	No. in season	Title	Original release date
9	1	"Culpable"	18 October 2022
10	2	"No salgas de casa"	18 October 2022
11	3	"Cosecha de tempestades"	18 October 2022
12	4	"La reunión"	18 October 2022
13	5	"El monstruo"	18 October 2022
14	6	"Claroscuro"	18 October 2022
15	7	"La conspiración"	18 October 2022
16	8	"Cruz de fuego"	18 October 2022

=== Season 3 (2023) ===
No. overall	No. in season	Title	Original release date
17	1	"La sangre de Cristo"	6 January 2023
18	2	"Guerra declarada"	6 January 2023
19	3	"El peso del ayer"	6 January 2023
20	4	"Una cucharada de su propio chocolate"	6 January 2023
21	5	"El peligro de las aguas mansas"	6 January 2023
22	6	"La suerte está echada"	6 January 2023
23	7	"Hallazgos"	6 January 2023
24	8	"Juego de máscaras"	6 January 2023
25	9	"Pronóstico de tormenta"	6 January 2023
26	10	"El abismo y el cielo"	6 January 2023

== Production ==
In June 2021, the series was announced as one of the titles for TelevisaUnivision's streaming platform Vix+. Filming began on 24 January 2022 and concluded in June 2022. The series premiered on 21 July 2022. The second season premiered on 18 October 2022. The third and final season was released on 6 January 2023.
