= Lalola =

- Genre: Telenovela
- Created by: Sebastian Ortega
- Written by: Nuri Abramowicz; Santiago Calori; Susana Cardozo; Daniel Datola; Esther Feldman; Carolina Gonzalez; Pablo Lago; Marisel Lloberas; Alejandro Maci; Sebastián Ortega; Alejandro Quesada
- Directed by: Gustavo Luppi; Diego Suárez; Marcelo Suárez; Mariano Ardanaz; Nicolás Mazzi
- Starring: Carla Peterson; Luciano Castro; Muriel Santa Ana; Rafael Ferro; Agustina Lecouna; Sandra Ballesteros
- Theme music composer: Alejando Sergi
- Opening theme: "Enamorada" by Miranda!
- Ending theme: "Hola" by Miranda!
- Country of origin: Argentina
- Original language: Spanish
- No. of seasons: 1
- No. of episodes: 150

Production
- Executive producer: Mónica Faccennini
- Producers: Celina Amadeo; Pablo Cullel
- Running time: 45 minutes
- Production companies: América TV; Dori Media Contenidos; Underground Contenidos

Original release
- Network: América 2
- Release: August 28, 2007 – April 29, 2008

Lalola is an Argentine television comedy show broadcast by América 2. Directed by Gustavo Luppi, Diego Suárez, Marcelo Suárez, Mariano Ardanaz and Nicolás Mazzi, it stars Carla Peterson, Luciano Castro, Muriel Santa Ana, Rafael Ferro, Agustina Lecouna and Sandra Ballesteros. It aired from August 28, 2007 to April 29, 2008. The show won nine Martín Fierro Awards for 2007, and also the Gold Prize.

A pilot for an American version, entitled Eva Adams, was filmed in 2009 for Dori Media Group, Sony Pictures Television, and Fox Broadcasting Company starring Rhea Seehorn and James Van Der Beek. It was envisioned as a dramedy, in the vein of how Yo soy Betty la fea was adapted for American audiences as Ugly Betty, but it ultimately wasn't picked up for a regular series.

== Synopsis ==
Ramiro "Lalo" Padilla (played by Juan Gil Navarro) is the director of the media company "High Five", editor of the famous magazine Don, and has many women around him. Romina (played by Marcela Kloosterboer), who is in love with Lalo, decides to punish his lack of commitment to her. She hires a witch to cast a spell on him, which turns him into a very beautiful woman, as Romina wanted him to know what it is like for a woman who is being harassed.

Lalo (now played by Carla Peterson) awakes as a woman, in a state of utter confusion. However, Lalo's friend Graciela ("Grace") Neira (played by Muriel Santa Ana) believes what happened as she heard Romina's phone call to Lalo's home saying what she did. As it seems unlikely anyone else will believe that Ramiro has been magically transformed, Ramiro assumes a new identity: Dolores "Lola" Padilla, cousin of Lalo. Lalo "had to make an urgent trip to Germany because his father became ill", and has appointed Lola to take his place. While trying to find a way to change back, there are a whole new set of challenges to face that Lalo didn't have to experience before, both within and outside the workplace.

== Cast and characters ==
- Carla Peterson ... Dolores "Lola" Padilla / Daniela Calori
- Luciano Castro ... Facundo "Nando" Canavaro
- Muriel Santa Ana ... Graciela "Grace" Neira
- Rafael Ferro ... Gastón Zacks
- Agustina Lecouna ... Natalia Aguirre
- Luis Ziembrowski ... Donato Aguirre
- Sandra Ballesteros ... Vicky
- Violeta Urtizberea ... Julia
- Lola Berthet ... Soledad
- Víctor Malagrino ... Patricio "Pato" Miguel
- Diana Lamas ... Griselda
- Tomás de las Heras ... Nicolás
- Nahuel Mutti ... Boogie
- Matías Desiderio ... Martín
- Chela Cardalda ... Iris
- Bruna Castro ... Melisa
- Reina Reech ... Carola Aguirre
- Pablo Cedrón ... Teo
- Juan Gil Navarro ... Ramiro "Lalo" Padilla
- Marcela Kloosterboer ... Romina

== Theme songs ==
This telenovela has two theme songs, "Hola" and "Enamorada". Both are sung by the band Miranda!.

== International remakes ==
The show has been officially remade 14 times. All 15 versions are listed below. Of these, the 2009 pilot for the United States is the only version that never aired. All but two of the rest were brought to a successful conclusion, with the Turkish and Mexican versions cancelled without fully concluding the story. All of these remakes start with mostly the same initial premise but many of them head in very different narrative directions and ultimate conclusions than the original show. (A hidden table at the bottom of this section briefly describes the differences.)

Region/Country	Network/Channel	Production Company	Native title of remake	Original airing	Info	Ref.
Argentina	América 2	Dori Media Contenidos, Underground Contenidos	Lalola	August 28, 2007	The original version of Lalola lasted 150 episodes and inspired 14 remakes for other countries.	
Chile	Canal 13	Televisión Nacional de Chile (TVN), FremantleMedia	Lola	September 26, 2007	The Chilean version was 276 episodes. Originally intended to run 150 episodes like the Argentine version, Chile's Lola had the story extended an additional 126 episodes before finally concluding.	
Spain	Atresmedia: Antena 3, Nova	Zebra Producciones	Lalola	July 6, 2008	This 160 episode Spanish remake stars Marina Gatell. Antena 3 chose to compress episodes 133–160 into 6 summary episodes 133–138, reducing their episode total to 138. However, immediately after Antena 3 concluded the series, Nova chose to fully air the final 28 episodes as originally intended. Both Antena 3 and Nova are part of Atresmedia, who licensed the show from Dori Media International.	
Turkey	Kanal 1 (ep 1-20) Fox Türkiye (ep 21-26)	Medyapım	Ece	August 4, 2008	The Turkish remake was produced by Medyapım. 20 episodes were aired by Kanal 1, then the show moved to Fox Turkey, which aired 6 more episodes before the show was canceled due to poor ratings. The Kanal 1 episodes ran around 48 minutes each, while the Fox episodes ran around 78 minutes each.	
Greece; Cyprus	ANT1	Ena Productions	Λόλα (English: "Lola")	September 22, 2008 in Greece; and September 29, 2008 in Cyprus	Λόλα ("Lola"), a 202 episode Greek version of the series, aired from September 2008 to July 2009 in Greece and Cyprus. The series starred Anta Livitsanou and Thanasis Efthimiadis.	
Belgium	VTM	Studio-A	LouisLouise	September 24, 2008	This 200-episode Dutch language series starred Hilde De Baerdemaeker, Axel Daeseleire and Roel Vanderstukken.	
Philippines	GMA Network	GMA Entertainment TV	LaLola (Stylized lal♂l♀)	October 13, 2008	This 85-episode Filipino language series starred Rhian Ramos as Lola and JC de Vera as Facundo. Wendell Ramos portrays the male version - Lalo.	
Ukraine; Russia	1+1; STS	CTC Media, Kostafilm	Маргоша (English: "Margosha")	February 7, 2009; September 7, 2009	This Russian language remake was produced by CTC Media (STS) and their subsidiary KostaFilm in Moscow, but the 240 episodes began airing in Ukraine on 1+1 seven months prior to airing in Russia on CTC. Unlike the other versions, "Margosha" was divided into season 1 (60 episodes), season 2 (90 episodes), and season 3 (90 episodes). Seasons 1 and 2 generally followed the 150 Argentine episodes, while the third season extended the storyline.	
United States	FOX, Sony	Sony Television, Woodridge Productions, Fanfare Productions	Eva Adams	March 20, 2009	This show starred Rhea Seahorn, Will Arnett, James Van Der Beek, Kat Foster, and David Denman. Only the pilot episode was made, and the show was never picked up.	
India	Sony Entertainment Television (India)	DJ's a Creative Unit	Bhaskar Bharti	May 25, 2009	This remake in Hindi was 120 episodes starring Ragini Khanna, Aamir Ali and Eijaz Khan.	
Vietnam	VTV3	Công ty Cổ phần Sáng tạo (Creative Media), Kiet Tuong Ltd	“Cô nàng bất đắc dĩ” (English: "Unavoidable Girl")	July 6, 2009	A Vietnamese version called Unavoidable Girl premiered on July 6, 2009. It aired every Monday to Wednesday at 9 PM. The series was set to have 150 episodes, but was trimmed to 100 episodes with the story still brought to its conclusion.	
Portugal; Angola	TVI; TPA 1	Nicolau Breyner Produções (NBP)/Casa da Criação	Ele é Ela (English: “He is She”)	October 31, 2009	This remake was produced by Nicolau Breyner Produções (NBP)/Casa da Criação in Lisbon, and aired in both Portugal and Angola. There were 28 episodes, and the show had the audience use telephone voting to decide how the main character would end up.	
Indonesia	Indosiar	Soraya Intercine Films	Pejantan Cantik (English: "Beautiful Stud")	December 6, 2010	This short series was 15 episodes, and aired in late 2010. It starred the popular Indonesian on-screen comedian couple Agnes Monica and Okan Kornelius who also appeared together in the drama Kawin Muda ("Early Marriage") in 2008. Pejantan Cantik ran for 3 weeks, but the story ran for 6 weeks. The second half of the story was titled Marisa, premiering on Indosair December 27, 2010, immediately following Pejantan Cantik.	
Peru	Frecuencia Latina Network	Imizu Producciones	Lalola (Stylized lal♂l♀)	January 20, 2011	The Peruvian version of Lalola was 145 episodes and starred Gianella Neyra, Bernie Paz, Cristian Rivero, and Anneliese Fiedler. The debut episode reached 20.2 points.	
Mexico	Vix	Dori Media International, Atenea Media	Lalola	February 2, 2024	The Mexican version of Lalola (announced 5 May 2023) is produced by Dori Media International for Vix and stars Bárbara de Regil and Alejandro de la Madrid. Two seasons were produced, then the show was cancelled. This left a total of 19 episodes, 9 in season 1 and 10 in season 2.	

Differences Between Versions - Warning! Spoilers

The various versions of Lalola differed in detail. The setting was usually a men's magazine, however the show was set in the country of each version, and the dialog was in the language or dialect of that country. Names of characters differed, and many of the less significant incidental subplots differed. Below are descriptions of the main plots only to show how they differed.

Region/Country	Native title of remake	Basic Plot
Argentina	Lalola	Lalo is the editor-in-chief of the men's magazine "Don". He is also a womanizer. One scorned lover has a witch curse Lalo, and he becomes Lola. Lola must create a new life for herself. Eventually, it is discovered that Lalo wasn't just transformed into a woman, but rather swapped bodies with a woman named Daniela, who the witch also cursed at the request of the boyfriend she cheated on. In the end, both of them are happier in their new bodies. Daniela liked being able to play the field without the judgment she would get as a woman, and Lola wishes to remain a woman and be with Facundo.
Chile	Lola	The show went through some re-writes to sideline Diego (the Chilean Facundo) because the actor had become unavailable for family medical reasons. Also, the show was popular and they chose to extend the original story to 276 episodes. As in the Argentine version, Lalo is turned into a woman by a witch, and this was actually a body-swap with another person (this time named Pepa). But, this time Pepa is actually the Witch's daughter, and another purpose of the spell was to protect Pepa from her abusive boyfriend Rubén. After a long time as a woman, Lalo comes to learn the value of the opposite sex. When Lola confesses love to Grace, the spell is broken and he becomes Lalo once more. He is about to marry Grace, but Pepa marries Rubén, causing the ghost of the witch to reactivate the protective spell. Thus, Lalo and Pepa become Lola and Pepe once more. Eventually, Pepa is freed of Rubén, Rubén kills himself, and Pepa falls for Justin. Briefly, Pepa and Lalo are back in their own bodies, long enough for Pepa to become pregnant by Justin. But, the witch believes that actually the true love should be between Lalo and Pepa and switches them back to Lola and Pepe once more. They must convince the ghost of the witch to set them right. Unfortunately, Grace has tried to move on, and Lalo must win her back. In the end, the witch sets things right, and Lalo and Grace can be married.
Spain	Lalola	The setting changes to Spain, and Lola's love interest is named Sergio, but mostly this follows the original Argentine basic plot-line.
Turkey	Ece	In this version, it is the man Ege who is turned into a woman named Ece. The setting, is Turkey at a magazine called Black, and the love interest is named Omer. The show was cancelled early, and the last episode concluded with Ece being taken away in handcuffs.
Greece; Cyprus	Λόλα (English: "Lola")	The setting changed to Greece, at a magazine named "Mister", and the love interest is named Fotis, but it is mostly the original Argentine plot-line. In the end, Lola remains a woman to be with Fotis.
Belgium	LouisLouise	In this version the setting is Belgium, and Louis is transformed into Louise. The love interest is named Thomas. The original plot-line is mostly followed, and in the end, Louise remains a woman to be with Thomas.
Philippines	LaLola	This version deviates a bit from the Argentine original. Instead of being a magazine editor, our main character manages a distillery owned by his family. Lalo's best friend is a gay man rather than a woman. Lalo dates a "babaylan" (mythical magical being) named Ada who kills herself after he jilts her. Ada's sister Sera (also a babaylan) curses Lalo with a kiss that transforms him into Lola. This version lacks the angle where this is a body-swap with another person. In the end Sera offers to change Lola back, but Lola remains as a woman and with Facundo.
Ukraine; Russia	Маргоша (English: "Margosha")	In this version the setting is Russia, and the magazine is called MZh (for male & female). The chief editor, Gosha is turned into Margo. The chief love interest is named Andrei. She eventually discovers that she must find true love before the next eclipse in order to remain a woman. For a while she pursues Maxim (the woman occupying her original body), but in the end her true love proves to be Andrei.
United States	Eva Adams	In this version, the setting is the US. And, instead of a magazine, the characters work for Sharp Management, a sports management company. Adam Evanston is a womanizing sports agent who wakes up in the wrong body after having a "quicky" with a mystery-woman. Going by the name Eva Adams, she must help nice-guy Paul Byrne compete against ruthless Connor Strikes in the cut-throat business of sports marketing. Only the pilot was produced, so there was only ever the initial set-up.
India	Bhaskar Bharti	This version has a setting in India at a magazine called Men's Universe. In this story, a scorned lover prays to Lord Khrishna, and Lord Khrishna turns Bhaskar Bharti into a woman Bharti Bhaskar. This version lacks the angle where this is a body-swap with another person. Bharti develops a love interest with co-worker Armaan. In the end, Lord Krishna returns Bharti to being Bhaskar, a man. Another Bharti appears on the scene to imply a happy ending for Armaan.
Vietnam	“Cô nàng bất đắc dĩ” (English: "Unavoidable Girl")	In this story, the setting is Vietnam at a magazine called "Hào hoa" (Glamour). Editor Trần Anh Lân is turned into Trần Lan Anh without the angle where this is a body-swap with another person. In the end, Trần Lan Anh returns to being the man.
Portugal; Angola	Ele é Ela (English: “He is She”)	This version's setting is Portugal at a magazine called "H+7". In this story, Julio dates a female scientist then tries to brush her off. Needing a guinea pig to test her new drug, and suddenly displeased with Julio, the scientist slips a pill into his drink that will transform him into a female. SHE must go by the name Julietta until she can find a way to change back. This was a straight transformation with no body-swap involving another person. In the end, the scientist provides Julietta with the antidote, and she returns to being Julio. This MIGHT have ended with Julietta remaining female. The eventual ending-sex for Julio/Julietta was determined by the audience via telephone voting.
Indonesia	Pejantan Cantik (English: "Beautiful Stud")	The setting for this version is Indonesia, and the story-line deviates a lot from the Argentine original. The main character Ardi is not a philanderer, but kisses another girl for innocent reasons. His fiancée sees it and curses him. He is transformed into a woman and becomes Asmara. Instead of substituting a female actress for most of the show, the role of Asmara is mostly performed by actor Okan Kornelius in drag, with occasional brief appearances by actress Mawar Rizkina to remind the audience what all the other characters are seeing. This short series had simpler misadventures, with Ardi regaining his manhood in the end. Ardi was simply transformed into a woman, and there was no body-swap with another person. The series would continue (without the gender swap) in the follow-up series Marisa. The second series began immediately after the first with no hiatus between series.
Peru	Lalola	The setting for this version is Peru, but otherwise, the story line is mostly the original Argentine plot-line. In the end, Lola decides to remain a woman and be with Facundo.
Mexico	Lalola	The setting was Mexico, and generally follows the original Argentine plot-line. The show was cancelled early without concluding the story, and no body swap had yet been revealed.

== International broadcast ==
The original Argentine version of the series was also dubbed in 18 languages - Egyptian Arabic, Brazilian Portuguese, Czech, Georgian, Malay, Tagalog, Polish, Romanian, Russian, Slovenian, Serbian, Croatian, Turkish, English, Armenian, Hindi, and Vietnamese to be broadcast worldwide.

Region/Country	Network/Channel	Native title of the show	Original airing	Info
Arab League	MBC4	“مسلسل لولا” (“Lalola”)	September 18, 2010	The series was premiered on September 18, 2010 on MBC 4 broadcast via NileSat and ArabSat. It airs every night at 17:00 UTC and 21:00 UTC. It's dubbed in Egyptian Arabic with its original name "Lalola".
Brazil	SBT	Lalola	January 21, 2008	Ramiro, Facundo and Aguirre were respectively renamed Camilo, Fernando and Andrei in the dubbing. The first three episodes aired without breaks. It's dubbed in Brazilian Portuguese.
Czech Republic	TV Barrandov	Lalola	January 21, 2009	Premiered on TV Barrandov. It's dubbed in Czech.
Georgia	Rustavi 2	Lalola	October, 2008	It's dubbed in Georgian
Malaysia	TV3	Lalola	April 23, 2009	The series premiered on April 23, 2009, replacing Telemundo’s Marina. It airs every Monday to Thursday at 3:00 PM. Starting October 2009, dubbed in Malay with English subtitles.
Philippines	GMA Network	Lalola	June 29, 2009	Four months after the Philippine remake had ended, the original Argentine telenovela was dubbed in Tagalog language and broadcast on the GMA Network from Monday to Friday mornings.
Poland	TV4	Lalola	2008	Polish version kept its original title, “Lalola” and was broadcast in 2008. It's dubbed in Polish.
Romania	Național TV, Național 24 Plus	Lalola	2018	The last channels to broadcast Latin American series. It's dubbed in Romanian.
Russia	Domashny	Лалола (“Lalola”)	October 4, 2010	It's dubbed in Russian.
Slovenia	TV3 Slovenia	Lalola		It's dubbed in Slovenian
Serbia	TV Kosava	Lalola	May 12, 2008 - January 2009	It's dubbed in Serbian.
Bosnia and Herzegovina	Televizija OBN	Lalola		It's dubbed in Croatian
Turkey	Comedy Smart	Lalola		It's dubbed in Turkish
Zambia	MobiTV Zambia	Lalola	June 2007 - February 2008	MOBI TV Zambia aired 145 episodes of the original version in English. It aired on Mondays, Wednesday and Friday. It's dubbed in English
Armenia	Shant TV	Lalola		It's dubbed in Armenian
India	FIRANGI -World ki best Kahaniyan	Lalola	February 25, 2008	The show was dubbed in Hindi and aired in India as a flagship show for the channel Firangi at prime timing and dual slots of 5pm and 9pm. The show had a very successful run and was remade in India by SET.
Vietnam	HTV9	Cô nàng bất đắc dĩ ("Lalola")	April 10, 2010	The series was premiered on April 10, 2010. It airs at 6:30am on HTV9. It's voice-over in Vietnamese
Hungary	Cool TV	Laloa	February 2, 2009	The series was shown on Hungary's Cool TV dubbed in Hungarian
