= Mujeres asesinas (2022 TV series) =

Mexican television series

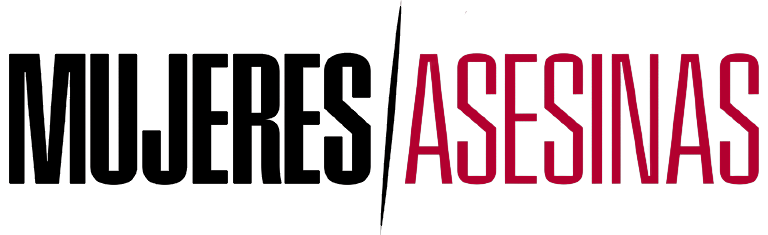
- Genre: Drama
- Based on: Mujeres asesinas series by Marisa Grinstein
- Developed by: Alicia Luna
- Country of origin: Mexico
- Original language: Spanish
- No. of seasons: 3
- No. of episodes: 24

Production
- Executive producers: Rafael Cuadros Valle; Luis Luisillo Miguel; Vincenzo Gratteri; Fernando Casasús Fernández; Manuel Badía; Jorge Bermúdez; Abraham Mancilla
- Editors: Felipe Ortiz Canseco; Jorge Silva; Coco Manrique
- Camera setup: Multi-camera
- Production companies: Plétora Productions; The Mall

Original release
- Network: Vix
- Release: 4 November 2022 – present

Related
- Mujeres asesinas (2005); Mujeres asesinas (2008)

Mujeres asesinas is a Mexican television series developed by Alicia Luna. It is a reimagined version of the series of the same name, based on the book series written by Marisa Grinstein. The series premiered on Vix on 4 November 2022.

In November 2024, the series was renewed for a third season that premiered on 16 May 2025. In March 2026, the series was renewed for a fourth season.

== Premise ==
Each episode presents a stand-alone story in which women face a difficult life because of violent partners, manipulative parents, or humiliating situations, and turn to violence and death to end their situation.

== Production ==
=== Development ===
On 29 June 2022, the series was announced for TelevisaUnivision's streaming platform Vix, with filming having begun earlier that month. The series premiered on 4 November 2022. On 27 September 2023, Vix renewed the series for a second season. The second season premiered on 15 March 2024. On 13 November 2024, Vix renewed the series for a third season. The third season premiered on 16 May 2025. On 25 March 2026, Vix renewed the series for a fourth season.

=== Casting ===
On 29 June 2022, it was announced that Yalitza Aparicio would star in an episode of the series. On 19 August 2022, Catherine Siachoque, Barbie Casillas, Macarena García, Jedet, Nicole Curiel, Claudia Martín, and Sara Maldonado were announced in starring roles. On 27 September 2023, Carolina Miranda, África Zavala, Litzy, Tessa Ía, Carolina Ramírez, Sofía Espinosa, Elyfer Torres and Ariana Saavedra were announced to star in the second season. On 13 November 2024, Angelique Boyer, Bárbara de Regil, Mar Sordo, Azul Guaita, Scarlet Gruber, Yare Santana, Cassandra Sánchez Navarro and Eileen Yáñez were announced to star in the third season. ON 25 March 2026, Angélica Rivera, Susana Zabaleta, Ana Brenda Contreras, Karena Flores, Paulina Gaitán, Vicky Araico, Livia Brito and Mayra Batalla were announced to star in the fourth season.

== Episodes ==
=== Series overview ===
Series	Episodes	Originally released	
Series	Episodes	First released	Last released
1	8	4 November 2022	23 December 2022
2	8	15 March 2024	26 April 2024
3	8	16 May 2025	27 June 2025

=== Season 1 (2022) ===
No. overall	No. in season	Title	Directed by	Written by	Original release date
1	1	"Las golondrinas"	Pepe Castro	Alicia Luna	4 November 2022
Silvia is a recently graduated nurse who has a close relationship with her mother, Marta. However, her relationship with her father, Rafael, is more complex. Rafael is a retired alcoholic policeman that physically and psychologically abuses Silvia and Marta. When Marta dies, Silvia decides to move out, but Rafael files a complaint against her for abandoning a disabled person. Upon returning home, Silvia begins to plan Rafael's death using her knowledge as a nurse. Cast: Macarena García as Silvia, Luis Felipe Tovar as Rafael, Claudia Ramírez as Marta, Julia Urbini as Luisa, Sebastián Poza as Leonardo, Diana Golden as Violeta, Olivia Duflos as Child Silvia
2	2	"La niña ladrona"	Pepe Castro	Alicia Luna	11 November 2022
Lupe was kidnapped as a child by Tere, while trying to cross the border to the United States with her parents. Tere forces Lupe to work on the streets to make a living, while her son Raúl becomes Lupe's protector and boyfriend, but that doesn't stop the abuse from Tere. When Anita, a six-year-old girl, arrives, Lupe decides to put a stop to Tere's abuse and child abductions. Cast: Barbie Casillas as Lupe, Arcelia Ramírez as Teresa, Leo Casta as Raúl, Ricardo Gómez as Memo, Pablo Astiazarán as the Priest, Tsayamhall as Lupe's mother, Julio Grijalva as Lupe's father, Ámbar Luz as Child Lupe, María Schwartau as Angelita, José Ángel Garrido as Child Raúl, Santiago Escobedo as César, Gerardo Saldaña as Carlitos, Baltazar Sebastián as Nando, Mía Fabri as Anita
3	3	"La insomne"	Carlos García Agraz	Alicia Luna	18 November 2022
After a fire in her house kills her family, Rocío loses the willpower to pursue her dreams as a teacher. Gabino, Rocío's boyfriend, proposes to take over her parents' business and start a family, but she is still haunted by the accident. Rocío and Gabino get married and have two children, but one of them dies, which further affects her mental health. Cast: Yalitza Aparicio as Rocío, Leticia Huijara as Doña Soco, Luis Fernando Peña as Gabino, Ana Silva Garza as Doña Flor, Nicole Salgado Hernández as Lucero, José Luis Huerta as Rocío's father, Mayahuel de Monte as Rocío's mother, Saúl Osvaldo as Ramón
4	4	"Llámame Paula"	Ana Lorena Perézrios	Alicia Luna & Fernando Casasús Fernández	25 November 2022
Ángel is a young physical therapist who decides to embrace his true self and sexuality by becoming Paula. After meeting Napoleón at work, Paula goes on a date with him. During a party, Napoleón introduces Paula to Mario, a successful architect, and they decide to compete for Paula's love. Napoleón becomes obsessed with Paula, and despite her rejection, he harasses her to the point of breaking into her house. Cast: Jedet as Paula, Axel Ricco as Napoleón, Ramiro Fumazoni as Mario, Jade Fraser as Ximena, Juan Sahagún as Juan, Gizeht Galatea as Amparo, Gina Pedret as Marcela
5	5	"Bodas de plata"	Pepe Castro	Alicia Luna	2 December 2022
Blanca is a submissive housewife who lives a marriage is full of secrets and betrayals. As Blanca and Fernando celebrate their 25th wedding anniversary, she signs their will, leaving their nephew Guillermo as their sole heir. Cast: Catherine Siachoque as Blanca, Alejandro de Hoyos as Guillermo, Antonio de la Vega as Fernando Longarés, Arleth Terán as Diana, Ruth Rosas as Soledad, Yolanda Ventura as Inés, Lisardo as Francisco del Río, Arena Ibarra as Marisol del Río, Luis Uribe as Don Andrés
6	6	"Como hermanas"	Pepe Castro	Alicia Luna	9 December 2022
Grisel is a timid and self-conscious teenager who hates the way she looks. Her mother constantly disdains her because of her eating habits and physical appearance. While looking for their purpose in life, Grisel and her best friend Ángelica become captivated by Pablo, a social media star, whose intense and fleeting personality captivates them. Cast: Nicole Curiel as Grisel, Alexa Archundia as Ángelica, Santiago Achaga as Pablo, Ludyvina Velarde as Patricia, Paco de la O as Ángelica's father, Paola Toyos as Ángelica's mother, Julia Maqueo as Jimena, Gabriel Santoyo as Homero, Ela Hernández as Lina, Oriana Gidi as Oriana
7	7	"La chef"	Carlos García Agraz	Alicia Luna	16 December 2022
Adriana goes out with Martín, a drug dealer. After Martín leaves her, Adriana opens a restaurant that quickly becomes popular. Years later, Martín returns to Adriana's life, and they begin their romance that was abandoned before. Cast: Claudia Martín as Adriana, Alex Perea as Martín, Carolina Politi as Berta, Benjamín Rivero as Miguel, Paty Díaz as Toña, Samuel Gallegos as Eugenio, Fernanda Bernal as Viviana, Diego Marino as Mozo, José Jaime Orozco as Poncho
8	8	"La condena"	Ana Lorena Perézrios	Alicia Luna	23 December 2022
Alejandra marries Fermín, who pretends to be her protector. After a while, Alejandra discovers that Fermín’s passion is merely a manifestation of his inordinate jealousy. Cast: Sara Maldonado as Alejandra, Arturo Barba as Fermín, Karina Gidi as Berta, Adriana Williams as Violeta, Pedro Romo as Gustavo

=== Season 2 (2024) ===
No. overall	No. in season	Title	Directed by	Written by	Original release date
9	1	"Rosario"	Pepe Castro	Alicia Luna	15 March 2024
Cast: Elyfer Torres as Rosario, Carlos Ferro as Guillermo, Emiliano García as Miguel, Santiago Vega as Francisco, Marco Núñez as Candido, Heberto Silva as Ezequiel, Rosalinda Esparza as Araceli, Lety Grey as Celia, Paulina de Lira as Catalina, Erudi Minero as Frida, Diana Mercado as Jacinta, Michael Velázquez as Rómulo
10	2	"Esmeralda"	Pepe Castro	Marisa Grinstein & Francisco Casasús Fernández	15 March 2024
Cast: Carolina Miranda as Esmeralda, Alosian Vivancos as Alex, Leidi Gutiérrez as Tere, Ana Patricia Rojo as Marina, René Strickler as Charly, Amairani Calderón as Naty, Abril Onyl as Clarita, Francisco Avendaño as Alex's father, Usi Velasco as Alex's mother, Monserrat Curries as Estela, Marco Sánchez as Martín, Karla Mora as Jacinta
11	3	"Virginia"	Pepe Castro	Marisa Grinstein	22 March 2024
Cast: Ariana Saavedra as Virginia, Diego Klein as Milton, Yéssica Salazar as Alba, Daniela Cortés as Simona, Brianda Barajas as Purificación, Alcira Chalbaud as Susana, Lizbeth Ramírez as Purificación's mom, Carlos Gallardo as Lucas / Tobias, Juan Ángel Esparza as Nelson, Jorge Landetta as Cristian, Diego Olaya as Alberto, Carlos César González as Alejandro
12	4	"Hortensia"	Carlos García Agraz	Alicia Luna	29 March 2024
Cast: Litzy as Hortensia, Alicia Jaziz as Azucena, Iván Amozurrutia as Matías, Juan Ríos as Adolfo, Gabriela Carrillo as Gloria, Sofy Marló as Lila, Estefania Martínez as Irene
13	5	"Lorenza"	Pepe Castro	Marisa Grinstein	5 April 2024
Cast: África Zavala as Lorenza, Vico Escorcia as Rita, Héctor Kotsifakis as Simón, Fátima Torre as Diana, Maria Lorette as Isa, Rodrigo Nuño as Fernando, José Antonio Estrada as Pedro, Celia Marcué as Alicia, Alejandro Porter as Abel
14	6	"Aurora"	Kenya Márquez	Marisa Grinstein	12 April 2024
Cast: Tessa Ía as Aurora, Polo Morín as Eduardo, José Pablo Minor as Esteban, Catalia López as Lupe, Diego Zárate as Nico, Christian Venegas as Claudio
15	7	"Magdalena"	Carlos García Agraz	Marisa Grinstein	19 April 2024
Cast: Sofía Espinosa as Magdalena, Gabriel Carbajal as Sergio, Carlos Bonavides as the Inspector, Patricia Reyes Spíndola as Teodora, Gina Morett as Felipa, Anthuani Gi as Officer Ramírez, Erika Carrillo as Leonor, Alfonso Soto as Peter, Thelma Dorantes as Meche, Berenice Mastretta as Rosa
16	8	"Nancy"	Kenya Márquez	Alicia Luna	26 April 2024
Cast: Carolina Ramírez as Nancy, Adrián Ladrón as Benjamín, Rodrigo Oviedo as Abel, Ignacio Riva Palacio as Tomás, Dania Karenina as Betty, Lizette Araiza as Betty's mother, Valeria Rojas as 11-year-old Nancy, Galilea Jabbour as Eva, Lu Pichardo as Silvia

=== Season 3 (2025) ===
No. overall	No. in season	Title	Directed by	Written by	Original release date
17	1	"Adriana"	Javier Solar	Gerardo Naranjo	16 May 2025
Cast: Cassandra Sánchez Navarro as Adriana, Juan Luis Medina as Felix, Leonardo Pérez as Paco 8, Ivanka Peregrina as Alesita, Lucía Barrenetxea as Susy, Raquel Robles as Tasi, Miriam Balderas as Criz, Luis Loria as Don Felix, Emilio Caballero as Halcón Plateado, Abel Fernando as Moisés, Carlos Solano as Minion Dorado
18	2	"Raquel"	Javier Solar	Alicia Luna	16 May 2025
Cast: Bárbara de Regil as Raquel, Mateo Ortega as Jandro, Sergio Bonilla as Modesto, Ramón Medina as Andrés, Ricardo Polanco as Juan, Jonathan Andrade as Raúl, Diana Elynel as Ms. Paty
19	3	"Fátima"	Lorena Padilla	Alicia Luna	23 May 2025
Cast: Yare Santana as Fátima, Elisa Zulueta as Paula, Jerry Velázquez as Benny, Andrea Rossell as Alejandra, Anahí Dávila as María, Alberto Amador as Francois Petit, Lidia San Joséa as Leyre
20	4	"Pilar"	Unknown	Unknown	30 May 2025
Cast: Angelique Boyer as Pilar
21	5	"Kenya"	Unknown	Unknown	6 June 2025
Cast: Mar Sordo as Kenya
22	6	"Nayeli"	Unknown	Unknown	13 June 2025
Cast: Scarlet Gruber as Nayeli
23	7	"Anabel"	Unknown	Unknown	20 June 2025
Cast: Azul Guaita as Anabel
24	8	"Martha"	Unknown	Unknown	27 June 2025
Cast: Eileen Yáñez as Martha

== Awards and nominations ==
Year	Award	Category	Nominated	Result	Ref
2025	Produ Awards	Best Anthology Series	Mujeres asesinas	Won	
2025	Produ Awards	Best Lead Actress - Crime Series	Bárbara de Regil	Won	
2025	Produ Awards	Best Lead Actress - Crime Series	Cassandra Sánchez Navarro	Nominated	
2025	Produ Awards	Best Lead Actress - Crime Series	Mar Sordo	Nominated	
