= Mauricio Henao =

Colombian actor

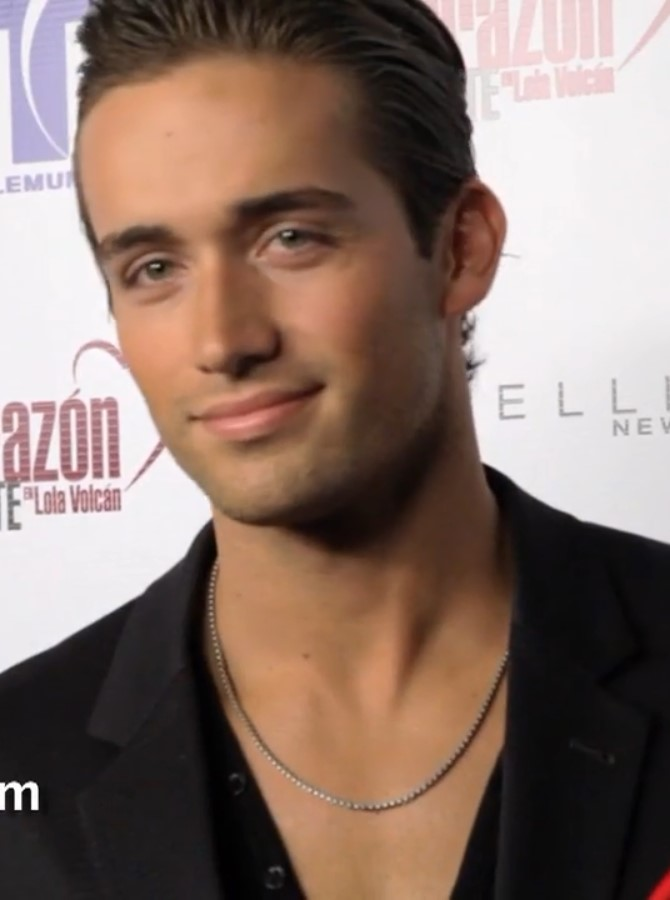
- Henao in 2011
- Born: Mauricio Henao Serbia; 16 February 1987 (age 39); Armenia, Quindío, Colombia
- Education: Cypress Creek High School
- Occupation: Actor
- Years active: 2010–present

Mauricio Henao Serbia (born 16 February 1987 in Armenia, Quindío, Colombia) is a Colombian actor. He rose to international fame with his standout role as Tony on the Nickelodeon teen drama series Grachi, and he's also known for acting in telenovelas for Telemundo. More recently, Mauricio gained widespread attention for his role as Adrian Ferrer in the Netflix hit show, Fake Profile.

== Career ==
Henao grew up in Colombia until he turned 12 years, then moved to the United States where he studied at Cypress Creek High School. Subsequently he dedicated himself to modeling for different local cities in both Europe and the United States, arriving to work with Nicolas Felizola, Tommy Hilfiger, Calvin Klein, Paul Joe Paris, among others. Henao has repeatedly been compared to actors like James Dean, and Ryan Gosling. After appearing in several magazines as a model. In 2009 he decided to move to Miami, United States, where he began taking acting classes and learned to modify his Colombian accent. Subsequently, in 2010 he decides to perform the casting for Telemundo' telenovela ¿Dónde está Elisa?, where he played Eduardo Cáceres. Later that in the same year, he returns to work for Telemundo in the telenovela El fantasma de Elena, where he plays Michell. Although he had already excelled in two television projects, the role that made him be recognized nationally and internationally was Tony, main character of the first season of the Nickelodeon teen drama series Grachi. While filming Grachi, he came up with the opportunity to work for another Telemundo telenovela entitled Mi corazón insiste en Lola Volcán, where he played Daniel Santacruz, the younger brother of Jencarlos Canela in the telenovela.

In 2012 he won his first major role in the MTV teen drama series Último año, where he shared credits with Dulce María. In 2013, he obtained a special participation in the last chapters of the Televisa telenovela La Tempestad. In 2014 he was part of the main cast in the Telemundo telenovela La impostora. The following year he joined the cast of the series Señora Acero, where he played José Ángel Godoy, Michel Duval's best friend in the series. and lasted three seasons as part of the regular cast.

In 2023, Mauricio appeared in the Netflix series Fake Profile as a restaurateur. The series has a following within the LGBTQ community.

== Filmography ==
Television performance
Year	Title	Roles	Notes
2010	¿Dónde está Elisa?	Eduardo Cáceres	Series regular; 88 episodes
2010–2011	El fantasma de Elena	Michel	Series regular; 117 episodes
2011–2013	Grachi	Antonio "Tony" Gordillo	Main role (season 1), recurring role (seasons 2–3); 95 episodes
2011	Mi corazón insiste en Lola Volcán	Daniel Santacruz	Series regular; 116 episodes
2012	Último año	Martín Santoro	Main role; 68 episodes
2013	La Tempestad	Valentín	Series regular; 12 episodes
2014	La impostora	Jorge Altamira	Series regular; 116 episodes
2015–2018	Señora Acero	José Ángel Godoy	Series regular (seasons 2–4); 204 episodes
2018	Mi familia perfecta	Santiago Vélez	Series regular; 68 episodes
2019	Betty en NY	Fabio	Series regular; 56 episodes
2019–2020	Médicos	Marco Ávalos	Main role; 87 episodes
2022	La herencia	Mateo del Monte	
2022	High Heat	Daniel	Main role
2023	Fake Profile	Adrian Ferrer	Main role (season 1)
2025	La Jefa	Mateo Restrepo	
2026	El renacer de Luna	Federico Grajales Iturralde	

== Awards and nominations ==
Year	Award	Category	Work	Result
2012	Kids Choice Awards México	Favorite Supporting Actor	Grachi	Nominated
