= José José, el príncipe de la canción =

- Genre: Biographical; Telenovela
- Starring: Alejandro de la Madrid; María Fernanda Yepes; Itatí Cantoral; Rosa María Bianchi
- Theme music composer: Roberto Cantoral
- Opening theme: "El Triste" by José José
- Country of origin: United States
- Original language: Spanish
- No. of seasons: 1
- No. of episodes: 60

Production
- Camera setup: Multi-camera
- Production company: Telemundo Studios

Original release
- Network: Telemundo
- Release: 15 January – 6 April 2018

José José, el príncipe de la canción, or simply El príncipe de la canción (in English: "The Prince of Song"), is a Spanish-language American biographical telenovela that premiered on Telemundo on 15 January 2018 and concluded on 6 April 2018. The show is based on the life of the Mexican singer José José, and Alejandro de la Madrid stars as the titular character.

The first season is on Netflix since 1 June 2018 and has a total of 75 episodes.

== Cast ==
- Alejandro de la Madrid as José José
- María Fernanda Yepes/Alpha Acosta as Anel
- Itatí Cantoral as Natalia "Kiki" Herrera
- Rosa María Bianchi as Margarita Ortiz
- Damián Alcázar as José Sosa Esquivel
- Danna Paola as Lucero
- Ana Ofelia Murguía as Carmelita
- Juan Carlos Colombo as Carlos Herrera Calles
- Raquel Pankowsky
- Carlos Bonavides as Don Manuel Gómez
- Silvia Mariscal
- Jorge Jimenez as Abel Solares
- Carlos Athié as Pedro Salas
- Manuel Balbi as Nacho
- Gonzalo Vega Jr. as José José (young)
- Mauricio Isaac as Chumo
- Axel Arenas as Gonzalo Sosa
- Sylvia Sáenz as La Güera
- Yunuen Pardo as Mili Graf
- José Angel Bichir as Manuel Noreña Grass
- Pedro de Tavira as Alfonso Lira
- Ricardo Polanco as La Jorja
- Alejandro Calva as Toño Camacho
- Ariana Ron Pedrique as Laurita
- José María Galeano
- Gabriel Navarro as Jorge Landa
- Fernanda Echeverria
- Yolanda Abbud as La Negra
- Malillany Marín as Sara Salazar
- Ana Layevska as Christian Bach

== Production ==
=== Background ===
The pre-production of the series was confirmed in 2012 under the title of Nace un ídolo, but 5 years later it was confirmed through a Telemundo press conference for the 2017-2018 television season.

=== Promotion ===
The first teaser of the series was shown for the first time in August 2017, while the complete advance of the series was launched on Telemundo on 19 December 2017, during the broadcast of the fourth season of Señora Acero, during that same time, it was also revealed that will air on Telemundo on 15 January 2018. The first three episodes were released online on 1 January 2018.

== Ratings ==
Viewership and ratings per season of José José, el príncipe de la canción
Season	Timeslot (ET)	Episodes	First aired		Last aired		Avg. viewers (millions)	18–49 rank
Season	Timeslot (ET)	Episodes	Date	Viewers (millions)	Date	Viewers (millions)	Avg. viewers (millions)	18–49 rank
1	Mon–Fri 8pm/7c	57 (Note: Should reflect the number of episodes that contribute to the average given in the last column.)	15 January 2018	1.48	6 April 2018	0.89	1.00	TBD

== Episodes ==
No.	Title	Original release date	US viewers (millions)
1	"Persiguiendo la nave del éxito"	15 January 2018	1.48
A humble boy, whose only value was his voice, knew that by recording 'La Nave del Olvido' he would be able to show the world his talent. This is how José José el principe de la canción emerged, a prince full of internal demons.
2	"1970, ganar y perder"	16 January 2018	N/A
José loses the first place of the festival, but manages to capture the attention of the public. At the same time, his brother is jealous of his success. Lucero can not cope with the fame of José José.
3	"Un lucero que se apaga"	17 January 2018	1.33
Lucero realizes that his dreams and those of José are different. Anel wants to meet José at any cost, while he gets a tour to go to the United States. Kiki lives it partying.
4	"Disco de oro"	18 January 2018	1.31
José José receives the gold disc, from Anel in Los Angeles. She gets in Pepe's eyes, although his heart is with Lucero. Lucero has a scholarship to go to London and that distance them.
5	"Enredos amorosos"	19 January 2018	1.16
José José and Kiki coincide in Caracas. Too many glasses of wine provoke a compromising situation. Anel is enraged when she sees the photo in the newspaper. Pepe was happy for one night and Lucero finds out.
6	"Detrás del ídolo"	22 January 2018	1.15
Anel is disappointed with Pepe, but takes a new impulse and goes to see him in Puerto Rico. Lucero's stomach turns jealous. Kiki does witchcraft on Pepe to catch him in love.
7	"Amor embrujado"	23 January 2018	1.06
Kiki looks for the dark side of Anel to put her in evidence and move her away from Pepe. Lucero, grateful to Margarita, announces that she is leaving. El Chumo is confessed by the demon of alcohol.
8	"El carácter se impone"	24 January 2018	1.25
The opportunity to sing live on national television, fades. José José makes his debut at El Patio and the three women attend the event. The singer recognizes Lucero as his source of inspiration.
9	"El sabor de la fama"	25 January 2018	1.10
As a singer, José José already earns enough money to buy a house for his family. Two roads open to world fame: TV and the next album in the cinema. Kiki gets away with it.
10	"Reencuentros peligrosos"	26 January 2018	0.99
At a reception with the cream of Mexico, where Anel attends, there are provocations. José José apologizes, knowing more about his past. Minerva cheats on Gonzalo. Kiki lies to her ex.
11	"Vuela por el mundo"	29 January 2018	1.14
José José smells alcohol and Margarita detects it. He and Chumo fly to Miami and start the international tour. Already on the plane, both drink, but one gets drunk. Minerva steals Margarita.
12	"La enfermedad de Chumo"	30 January 2018	1.14
Raúl Ortíz, El Chumo, gives his word to the Virgin of Guadalupe: not to drink for 12 months. But he breaks his promise and El Pelón makes him pay the consequences. José José feels guilty.
13	"Impulso del corazón"	31 January 2018	1.18
The forced disappearance of José José causes a crisis in the relationship with Kiki. He makes a decision that will affect him for life. El Pelón, is about to cancel his last show in Panama.
14	"Chantaje"	1 February 2018	1.01
The journalist Lira warns José José that someone seeks to destroy Kiki's reputation. To avoid it, she asks for money. The singer plays another card. They send a check to Margarita.
15	"Primero en las listas"	2 February 2018	0.86
José José leads the tuning lists. He confronts Don Carlos Herrera and hands him the broken check in a thousand pieces. Kiki is expelled from her home. Minerva pays to lie about her pregnancy.
16	"El desplante"	5 February 2018	0.99
José José surprises Kiki with Javier and becomes jealous. She gives him a pipe that could become an uncontrollable demon. On the day of the wedding, Lira has very bad news to publish.
17	"La boda de José y Kiki"	6 February 2018	1.07
With very few guests, José José and Kiki swear eternal love. At the record company they are happy for the payment of the exclusive photos of the couple, but someone leaks information to the fan club.
18	"Finanzas en rojo"	7 February 2018	0.95
The diversion of funds brings economic consequences to José José. Kiki decides to interrupt the honeymoon. She reveals that she has epilepsy and takes pills to avoid seizures.
19	"A José José lo estafan"	8 February 2018	1.00
Pedro Salas and José José face El Pelón with the evidence in their hands. The star of the song stops being a promise and becomes a mentor to other singers.
20	"José José despide a su mánager"	9 February 2018	0.87
José José fires "El Pelón", Esparza. They offer El Chumo to be the promoter of the radio. The Sosa's eat dinner for the first time with the Herrera's. José José causes a stir with the signing of autographs.
21	"Las adicciones de Kiki"	12 February 2018	1.06
José José deals with Kiki's addictions and tantrums, and as a confirmed romantic, he goes ahead with his marriage. Anel leaves Jorge and thinks about José José.
22	"José José en la quiebra"	13 February 2018	1.00
José José discovers that El Pelón stole a million dollars and there is no way to recover the money. Kiki could lose her children, Don Carlos will fight for his custody.
23	"Kiki repudiada por fans"	14 February 2018	1.03
Kiki, worried about her husband, goes to the hospital where her sister-in-law is hospitalized, but a group of José José's fans prevents her from arriving. The life of Minerva and her baby hang by a thread.
24	"El Chumo tiene un accidente"	15 February 2018	N/A
José José is very concerned about his soul friend, El Chumo and does not want to travel. Kiki feels displaced and reproaches not to be the priority of marriage. Chumo has an accident.
25	"José José rinde tributo al Chumo"	16 February 2018	N/A
José José pays homage to his soul friend, who dies after losing control of the car and falling down a ravine. A new fight between José José and Kiki puts the marriage in check.
26	"Anel seduce a José José"	19 February 2018	1.11
Anel takes the opportunity to flirt with El Príncipe De La Canción who is having a terrible time with his wife Kiki.
27	"Kiki denuncia a José José"	20 February 2018	1.04
Kiki, hurt, stains the image of José José before the press. She complains that his ex is an alcoholic, a womanizer and does not like responsibilities. Kiki prepares a claim for abandonment of home.
28	"Anel se aumenta los senos"	21 February 2018	1.15
Like other actresses, Anel undergoes surgery to advance in her career and conquer the heart of José José. The Mexican singer collapses and is taken to the hospital in an emergency.
29	"José José vuelve con Anel"	22 February 2018	0.85
Anel visits José José in the hospital and the flame of passion among them is revived. He gets pampered and moves to Anel's house.
30	"Anel deja todo por José José"	23 February 2018	0.90
While José José and Anel fully live their romance, the singer suffers a strong pain in his chest that puts him on alert and the actress cancels all their commitments to devote to take care of him.
31	"José José se derrite por Anel"	26 February 2018	1.08
José José thanks Anel for her time, love and care. Now that he requires a lot of rehabilitation, discipline and zero excesses, the singer returns to the actress' house. Fanny is his representative.
32	"José José se desconcentra"	27 February 2018	0.96
José José and Anel go to the recording of the musical TV show Ossart. The singer worried about not being fully recovered, decides to make his first "playback", but not everything goes well.
33	"José José pierde el control"	28 February 2018	0.98
José José becomes angry with Anel when he finds out that he took medication against his addiction to alcohol, without his knowledge, in the shakes. Kiki smashes her ex on the radio.
34	"Anel sorprende a José José"	1 March 2018	0.87
Anel captures Pepe in fraganti. She is not jealous or upset with him. Kiki will destroy her rival, Anel for prostitute. José José's tour serves smuggling in the US and the border.
35	"José José internado por adicto"	2 March 2018	1.02
El príncipe de la canción no longer controls his addictions and takes him to a rehabilitation clinic. Anel crashes and José José must pay, which generates a discussion. Anel throws him out of his house.
36	"José José y Anel se separan"	5 March 2018	0.99
El príncipe de la canción and Anel decide to separate for the sake of the two, but before they make love. José José arouses Frank Sinatra's interest in recording an album, thanks to Anel.
37	"José José y Kiki se divorcian"	6 March 2018	1.05
El príncipe de la canción and his ex make a pact. The actress grants him a divorce and he is committed to promoting his career in the music industry. José José will not record with Frank Sinatra.
38	"José José quiere hijo de Anel"	7 March 2018	1.02
Anel recognizes that he went to Los Angeles to forget José José, but she did not succeed. El príncipe de la canción proposes to have a child. Kiki, although novice, is a pretentious singer.
39	"José José y Anel serán padres"	8 March 2018	0.98
Anel is pregnant and for her son, she is clean of drugs and alcohol. José José keeps coming drunk. Margarita, will be grandmother twice. Alicia and Gonzalo also expect a son.
40	"José José se casará con Anel"	9 March 2018	0.85
El príncipe de la canción surprises Anel and gives the engagement ring to the mother of his son, Pepito, a strong and healthy newborn.
41	"José y Anel, marido y mujer"	12 March 2018	0.87
In full marriage, Fanny demands separation of goods and Anel is filled with anger. El príncipe de la canción intercedes and the marriage becomes a reality. José José discovers that Anel uses drugs.
42	"Guerra por José José"	13 March 2018	0.87
El príncipe de la canción leaves his label of so many years and signs with Arroyo. The distribution of his first disc fails. Nora threatens Pedro for wanting to end José's career.
43	"José José lucha por su vida"	14 March 2018	0.89
José José loses control with alcohol and suffers a pre-hepatic coma. To save his life, they inject adrenaline against the doctor's opinion. The artist will receive a platinum album.
44	"Anel es mánager de José José"	15 March 2018	0.94
Anel displaces Fanny and manages a tour in Central America. José José accepts, but financial failure arrives. Juan Gabriel writes a musical theme for El príncipe de la canción.
45	"José José y Anel son infelices"	16 March 2018	0.88
El príncipe de la canción does not support Anel's bad habits. A new daughter arrives, Marisol. His career is on the cusp: he receives a gold record.
46	"José José fracasa en el amor"	19 March 2018	0.96
The success continues in the sales of the discs of el príncipe de la canción, but his relation with Anel hits bottom. The composer Manuel Alejandro is inspired by his pain to write his songs.
47	"Anel usa anfetaminas"	20 March 2018	1.02
Anel injects amphetamines under the pretext of losing weight and thus reconquer her husband. Jose puts his eyes on another woman. For the artist, his wife is an insurmountable problem.
48	"Anel trama robarle a José José"	21 March 2018	0.98
Manolo convinces his sister Anel to move part of José José's money to her personal account in the face of the threat of divorce. The singer has a meeting with his great idol, Frank Sinatra.
49	"Peligra la vida de José José"	22 March 2018	0.93
The singer collapses from exhaustion on his tour, he has no funds to pay for a doctor or a plane ticket. Hacienda sends an audit notice to José. Anel learns that Kiki died.
50	"José José descubre a su cuñado"	23 March 2018	0.84
José José finds out that his brother-in-law, Manolo, is stealing from him. The singer starts his movie "Gavilán o Paloma" and signs a contract with mobster Frenk. José suffers for the death of Kiki.
51	"Manolo juega sucio con Abel"	26 March 2018	1.00
Manolo takes revenge on Abel for having betrayed him. He puts money in José's medicine cabinet and then accuses him of stealing $14,000. Anel hires a private detective.
52	"Manolo es desenmascarado"	27 March 2018	0.96
José discovers that his brother-in-law does business behind his back, rents his equipment for a million dollars and lives the good life at his expense. José demands an audit.
53	"José José sobrevive a un sismo"	28 March 2018	1.04
El príncipe de la canción is devastated, after living the strong earthquake that shook the city of Mexico, leaving thousands dead. Manolo gets rid of the incriminating evidence.
54	"José José cae en una depresión"	29 March 2018	0.84
El príncipe de la canción, cornered by debts and exploited by his brother-in-law, is alone and ill. His only refuge is alcohol again. He arrives in the United States to make his way.
55	"José José arriesga su voz"	30 March 2018	0.66
A specialist diagnoses that el príncipe de la canción has nodules in the throat and in spite of his condition, the brothers Noreña demand a concert from him, putting in danger his career.
56	"Anel exige el divorcio a José"	2 April 2018	0.94
José José dismisses Manolo and he suggests Anel leave her husband, so that she receives a pension. When the artist arrives at his house, she gives him the document and closes the door in his face.
57	"José José vive en la calle"	3 April 2018	0.84
Anel leaves José without a dime and to forget his sorrows, the artist drowns in alcohol, makes a fool of himself in his surprise tribute, for his 30 years of career and decides to live in the street.
58	"José José conoce a Sara"	4 April 2018	0.93
The singer lives the most painful stage of his life; he even plays Russian Roulette. But fate puts Sara Salazar on his way, when he goes to Miami to recover his finances.
59	"José José se recupera con amor"	5 April 2018	1.00
Sarita is the engine of José José to resume his life and career, away from alcohol. The singer begins to recover in a health center. Anel, jealous, publicly commits to defame her.
60	"José entre éxitos y excesos"	6 April 2018	0.89
After suffering ups and downs with alcohol, drugs and financial problems, José José becomes an icon of Latin music. The singer shares his maturity with Sara and their daughter, Sarita.
