= Alejandro de la Madrid =

Mexican actor (born 1977)

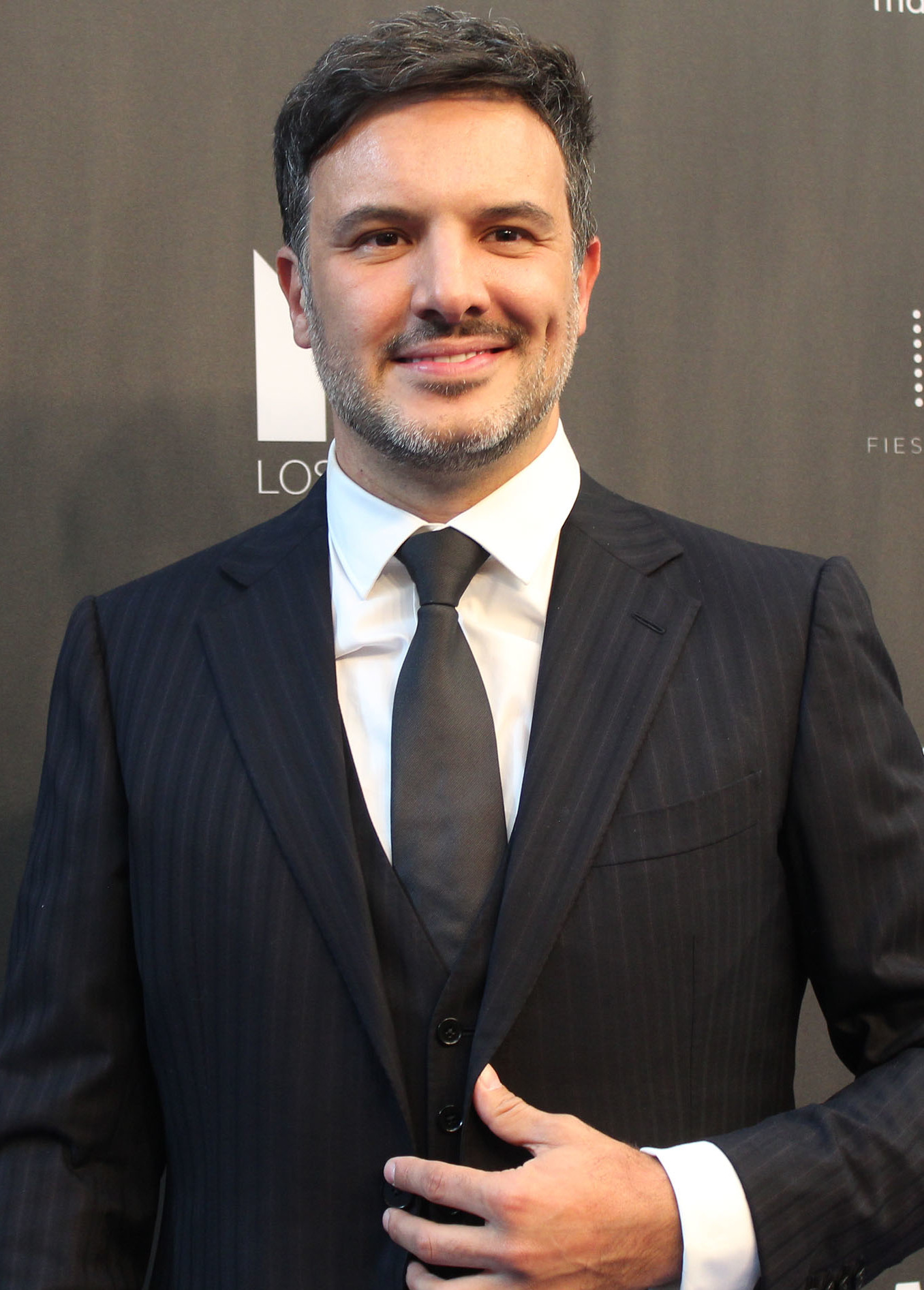
- De la Madrid at the 2019 Metropolitan Theatre Awards
- Born: Alejandro de la Madrid Nogueda; 23 March 1977 (age 49); Mexico City, Mexico
- Occupation: Actor

Alejandro de la Madrid (born 23 March 1977) is a Mexican actor. He is known for portraying the singer José José in the biographical series José José, el príncipe de la canción (2018) and Mexican president Luis Echeverría in the Apple TV+ crime drama Women in Blue (2024). For the role he underwent a three-hour prosthetic makeup process and worked with a coach on Echeverría's voice and posture.

== Filmography ==
=== Films roles ===
Year	Title	Roles	Notes
2003	Sin ton ni Sonia	Ayudante 1	
2009	El cártel	Officer Solana	
2010	Noches sin luna	Julio Hernández	Short film
2014	Qué le dijiste a Dios?	Héctor	
2014	Dos	Francisco	Short film
2014	Four Moons	Andrés	
2023	Like or Die	Imaginary Boyfriend	

=== Television roles ===
Year	Title	Roles	Notes
1996	Tú y yo	Alumno de la Preparatoria	
1997	Salud, dinero y amor	Unknown role	
2000	Locura de amor	Paco Ruelas	
2000	Carita de ángel	Jordy	
2001	Amigas y rivales	Rolando	
2001–2006	Mujer, casos de la vida real	Unknown role	15 episodes
2004	Luna, la heredera	Rodrigo Lombardo	
2004	Tormenta de pasiones	Gerardo / Alberto	
2007	Decisiones	Salomón	Episode: "Mecanismo ilusión"
2007	Sin vergüenza	Rafael Valdez	
2007–2008	Palabra de mujer	Adrián Vallejo	4 episodes
2008–2010	Mujeres asesinas	Hernán / Marcos	2 episodes
2008–2009	Un gancho al corazón	Ricardo	9 episodes
2009	Tiempo final	Tomás	Episode: "Cumpleaños"
2010	Gritos de muerte y libertad	Capitán Ulibarry	Episode: "El triunfo del temple"
2011	Amar de nuevo	Alejandro	
2011	El Equipo	Santana	4 episodes
2011	Como dice el dicho	Alfonso	1 episode
2013	Fortuna	Roberto Altamirano	
2014	Amor sin reserva	Jesús Zambrano	
2014–2016	El Señor de los Cielos	Ignacio Miravalle	214 episodes
2016	El hotel de los secretos	Alfredo Vergara	70 episodes
2016	Perseguidos	Uribe	
2017	Guerra de ídolos	Rafael Zabala	
2018	José José, el príncipe de la canción	José José	
2019	Preso No. 1	Bautista Fernández	
2019	Claramente	Emiliano	
2021	Monarca	Ignacio Urrutia	
2021	Te acuerdas de mí	Julio Gamboa	
2021	La templanza	Elías Andrade	
2021	No fue mi culpa: México	Adán	Episode: "Rosaura"
2022	La rebelión	Mauricio	
2023	Madre de alquiler	Arturo Lemus	
2024	El juego de las llaves	Samuel	Main role (season 3)
2024	Marea de pasiones	Zaid Espino	
2024	¿Quién es la máscara?	Pepe Nador	Season 6 contestant
2024	Lalola	Gastón	Main role
2024	Women in Blue	Luis Echeverría	Recurring role (season 1)
2026	Lobo, morir matando	Hernando Cruz	
2026	El renacer de Luna	Andrés Arteaga Villarreal	
