= Alicia Luna =

Spanish screenwriter, film director, and professor

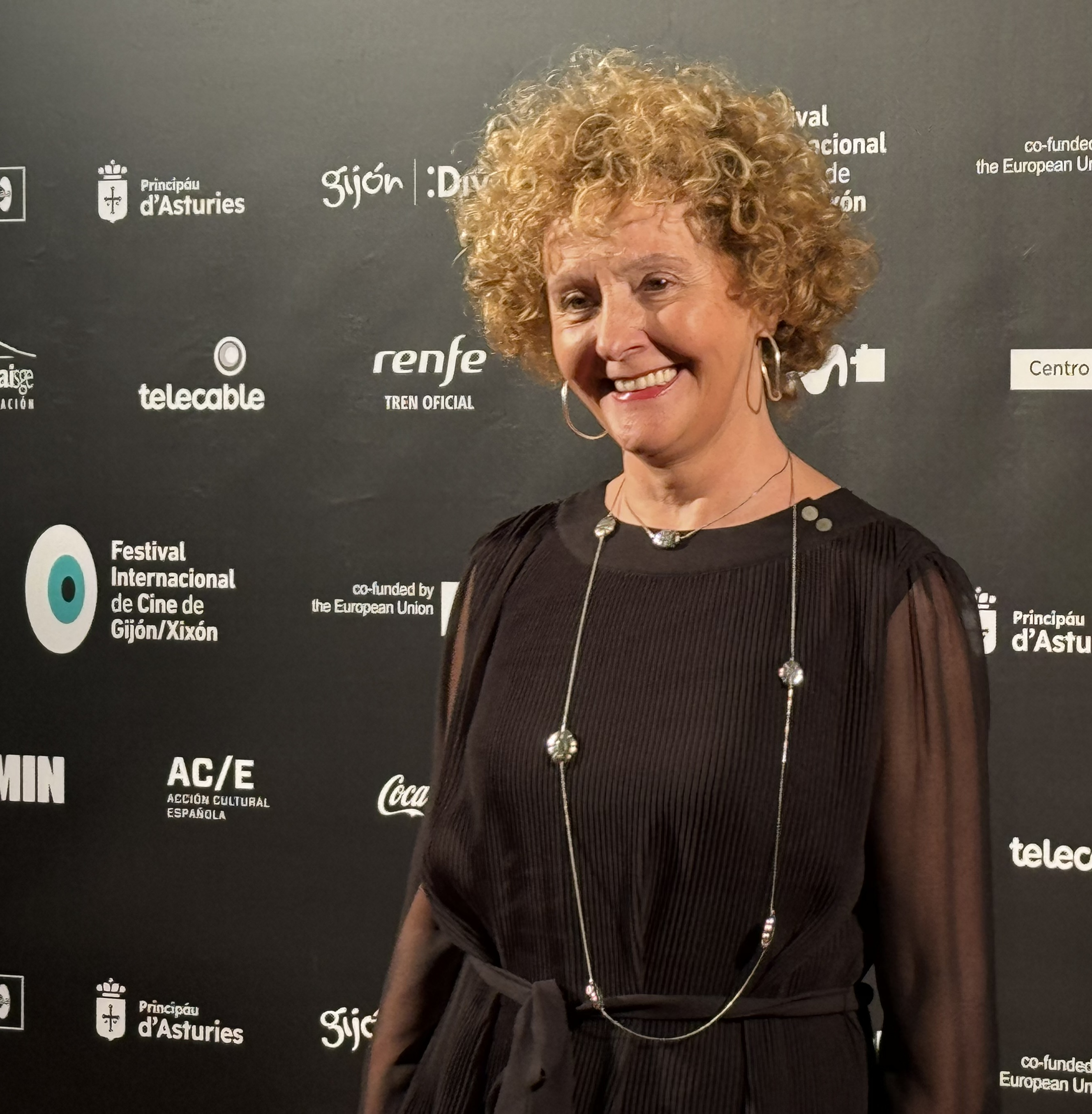

Alicia Luna (born December 2, 1963) is a Spanish screenwriter, film director, and professor. She has received awards such as the Audience Award at the Seminci of Valladolid Film Festival for the film Pídele cuentas al rey (1999), the Goya Award for Best Original Screenplay, and the Best European Screenplay Award for Te doy mis ojos (Take My Eyes) (2004), and the Malaga Film Festival Critics Award for La vida empieza hoy (Life Begins Today). She has also co-written the documentaries Chicas nuevas 24 horas (New Girls 24/7) and El proxeneta. Paso corto, mala leche (The pimp. Small step, bad mood). She is president of the Lydia Cacho Foundation, created in 2008 to help people threatened by human rights violations.

== Biography ==
Luna received a BA in Hispanic Philology from the Universidad Autónoma of Madrid and pursued graduate studies at the same university specializing in the literature of Spanish Civil War. She received a grant from the University of Warsaw to study Polish language and literature.

As a result of a trip to Lima in 1987 for the documentary on César Vallejo Acaba de pasar el que vendrá, she started to be interested in screenwriting. She took courses taught by José Luis Borau, Manuel Matji, Lola Salvador, Joaquín Jordá y Agustín Díaz Yanes, and in 1997 she studied screenwriting at the Universidad Politécnica de Cataluña.

Before moving into professional screenwriting, she collaborated with the Filmoteca Española Publications Department; she was the Head of Communication Department both for the Querejeta P.C. production company, and for the Alta Films distribution company. She was also founder and director of the sales office of the San Sebastian International Film Festival.

In 1999, in collaboration with Clara Pérez Escrivá and José Antonio Quirós, she co-authored her first script for the film Pídele Cuentas al Rey, which won the Best Script Award at the Peñíscola Comedy Festival. Her friendship with Iciar Bollain has led to a host of collaborations. They wrote the script of the fake documentary Amores que matan, directed by Bollain, and then the script of Te doy mis ojos, that won the 2004 Goya Award for Best Screenplay and the Award for Best European Screenplay.

In 2010, she wrote the films La vida empieza hoy (Life begins today) directed by Laura Mañá, and Sin ti, directed by Raimon Masllorens.

In 2014, she collaborated again with Iciar Bollain in a number of socially-oriented campaigns, and together they wrote the documentary En tierra extraña (In Foreign Land)

In the field of documentaries, she collaborated with Mabel Lozano in the script of two films about the world of prostitution, Chicas nuevas 24 horas (New Girls 24/7) and El proxeneta. Paso corto, mala leche (The pimp. Small step, bad mood), both directed by Mabel Lozano. Moreover she participated in the feminist collective film project Yo decido: El tren de la libertad (2014).

She wrote and directed a documentary about the research method of playwright José Sanchís Sinisterra, entitled La cabeza de José (José's Head)

In 2013 her satirical monologue about the lack of social commitment, La Voz de Doris Day, premiered in theaters. The same year, Se arreglan bicis for the series Mentes desordenadas was presented at La Casa Encendida. In 2017, the socially committed cabaret For Sale, a comedy on the life of Maria Cumplido in times of crisis, premiered at Luchana Theater.

She also wrote scripts for advertising and for several television series. Her latest works have been the TV movie 22 Angeles (2016) directed by Miguel Bardem for TVE34 and the coordination of the scripts for the TV series Central 5 produced by El Deseo in 2018.

Luna alternates screenwriting with her teaching activity. She is the co-director of the Master's degree in screenwriting and dramaturgy at the Universidad Autónoma de Madrid / Escuela de Guion de Madrid. She offered workshops at the Fundación Carolina, at the Laboratorio de Oaxaca (Mexico) sponsored by Sundance, in Colombia, and in Brazil. She taught for the Master's degree in screenwriting at the Universidad Carlos III de Madrid, and she is the director and founder of the Escuela de Guion de Madrid. She has also published two books on how to teach screenwriting: Matad al guionista y acabaréis con el cine (1999) and Nunca mientas a un idiota. Póker para guionistas y demás escribientes (2012).

She is a founding member and president of the Lydia Cacho Foundation created in 2008, a foundation that helps people threatened by human rights violations. She is also a member of CIMA, the Spanish Association of Women in Film and Media. Since 2014 she has been a member of the board of directors of the Spanish Academy of Cinematographic Arts and Sciences.

== Filmography ==
Screenwriter

Year	Title	Format-Genre
1987	Acaba de pasar el que vendrá	Documentary
1996	Chasco	Short
1997	Todos los hombres sois iguales	Telecinco TV Series (Chapter 37)
1998	Al salir de clase	Telecinco TV Series (Chapter 86)
1999	Pídele cuentas al rey	Feature Film
2000	Amores que matan	Short / Fake Documentary
2004	Te doy mis ojos	Feature Film
2005	Sin ti	Feature Film
2010	La vida empieza hoy	Feature Film
2014	Todo el tiempo del mundo y Aquí el paraíso	Fake Documentary
2014	En tierra extraña	Documentary
2015	Chicas nuevas 24 horas	Documentary
2016	22 Ángeles	TV-Movie
2016	La cabeza de José	Documentary
2018	El proxeneta, paso corto, mala leche	Documentary
2020	La boda de Rosa	Feature Film

== Awards ==
Year	Award	Film	Result
1999	Audience Award, SEMINCI Valladolid	Pídele cuentas al rey	Winner
1999	Best Script Festival de Peñíscola	Pídele cuentas al rey	Winner
1999	Audience Award Festival Internacional San Juan de Luz	Pídele cuentas al rey	Winner
2003	Goya Award for Best Screenplay	Te doy mis ojos	Winner
2004	Best European Script	Te doy mis ojos	Winner
2004	Círculo de Escritores Cinematográficos Best Script	Te doy mis ojos	Winner
2010	Film Critics Award	La vida empieza hoy	Winner

== Publications ==
- Cines Renoir 10 años de películas. (1996) Cines Renoir-Alta Films
- Matar al guionista y acabaréis con el cine. (1999) Ediciones Nuer
- Nunca mientas a un idiota. Póker para guionistas y demás escribientes. (2012) Alba Ediciones
- "Guion" in Guía de creación audiovisual. (2016) Cristina Andreu, Ediciones Cooperación Española.
