= Paramount Television International Studios =

Global TV production arm of Paramount Skydance

- Formerly: Viacom International Studios (2015–2019); ViacomCBS International Studios (2019–2022)
- Type: Division
- Founded: 5 October 2015; 11 years ago
- Headquarters: Miami, Florida, United States
- Owners: Viacom (2015–2019); ViacomCBS/Paramount (2019–2025); Paramount/Skydance (2025–present)
- Parent: Paramount Television Studios
- Divisions: Paramount Social Impact

Paramount Television International Studios, formerly known as Viacom International Studios and ViacomCBS International Studios, is a television production and distribution arm of Paramount Television Studios. Launched on 5 March 2015, it produces scripted content for its streaming service Paramount+, provide production services for a variety of genres and commissions television programs for international Nickelodeon channels, British channel 5 and for third-party broadcasters and distributors.

== History ==
Viacom International Media Networks (now Paramount International Networks) announced on 5 October 2015 that it would open a global production division within the headquarters of Viacom International Media Networks Americas (now Paramount Networks Americas) in Miami, Florida that would serve as a production hub for the international variants of Nickelodeon, MTV and Comedy Central entitled Viacom International Studios that would serve as Viacom's production capabilities for global networks whilst the new international studio would produce local adaptations of Viacom's productions including original scripted & unscripted content for its global networks and digital platforms worldwide, with VIMN president Bob Bakish adding its operations to his broader role as VIMN president as he headed the new division as president. Following the launch, VIS had opened up a new production studio facility based in the same place also within VIMNS Americas' HQ and would be served as the home of Viacom International Studios' productions. Its first production for a global audience was I Am Frankie for Nickelodeon, based on the Nickelodeon Latin America telenovela Yo soy Franky.

By May 2018, Viacom consolidated its Latin American production subsidiaries including Viacom's own Latin American branded production unit, the production studios of Argentinian television network Telefe (which Viacom acquired in November 2016) and its Brazilian comedy production subsidiary Porta dos Fundos into Viacom International Studios with them absorbing its content production and sales capabilities whilst Brazilian comedy production unit Porta dos Fundos became the former's own Brazilian production outfit.

On 3 April 2019, Viacom International Studios expanded its production operations into the United Kingdom and Spain with the establishment of two production offices in Manchester and Madrid to extend its capacity in both the English and Spanish languages outside of its main headquarters while increasing its production operations in Camden, London, as British non-scripted production subsidiary Elephant House Studios (who produced content for broadcast on Viacom's British television network Channel 5 (now simply just 5) & its pay-TV channels) which was also based in Camden had been moved to the Miami-based international production arm and was rebranded as its British production division retitled to Viacom International Studios UK. The rebranded UK division had also opened up a Manchester production hub based at the dock10 television facility in MediaCityUK, it produces content for broadcast on British channel 5 and Viacom's pay-TV channels and also started supporting its push to secure English-language commissions from UK third party broadcasters and distributors, with general manager Joe McClusky and creative director Ed Taylor continuing to lead the rebraned production subsidiary-turned division Viacom International Studios UK and Paramount & Comedy Central international chief Jill Offman managing and gaining oversight of its operations including its British production unit Viacom International Studios UK.

During MIPCOM 2021 on 11 October, ViacomCBS International Studios formed a new social impact division entitled VIS Social Impact, the new division is dedicated to developing social impact-driven content focused on topical issues such as climate, equality and health as part of its larger Content for Change initiative & would focus on the assess of impact on issues including climate and health within content produced across ViacomCBS' portfolio of brands including its streaming service Paramount+, as well as for third-party partners with senior vice president of social responsibility at ViacomCBS Networks International, Georgia Arnold, heading the division.

On 18 May 2023, Paramount Global rebranded its international production subsidiary ViacomCBS International Studios (VIS) to Paramount Television International Studios as part of a unified rebranding with an expanded focus to make available new and existing content on Paramount+.

Two months later in July of that year following the rebranding, it was announced that it was shuttering & restructuring Spanish production operations, ending its local productions for third-party commissioners and significantly reduce its workforce in that country. However, Sebastián Vibes, VP of sales and co-production, would continue to support Paramount Television International Studios.
