= Dori Media Group =

Media organization

Dori Media Group Ltd.
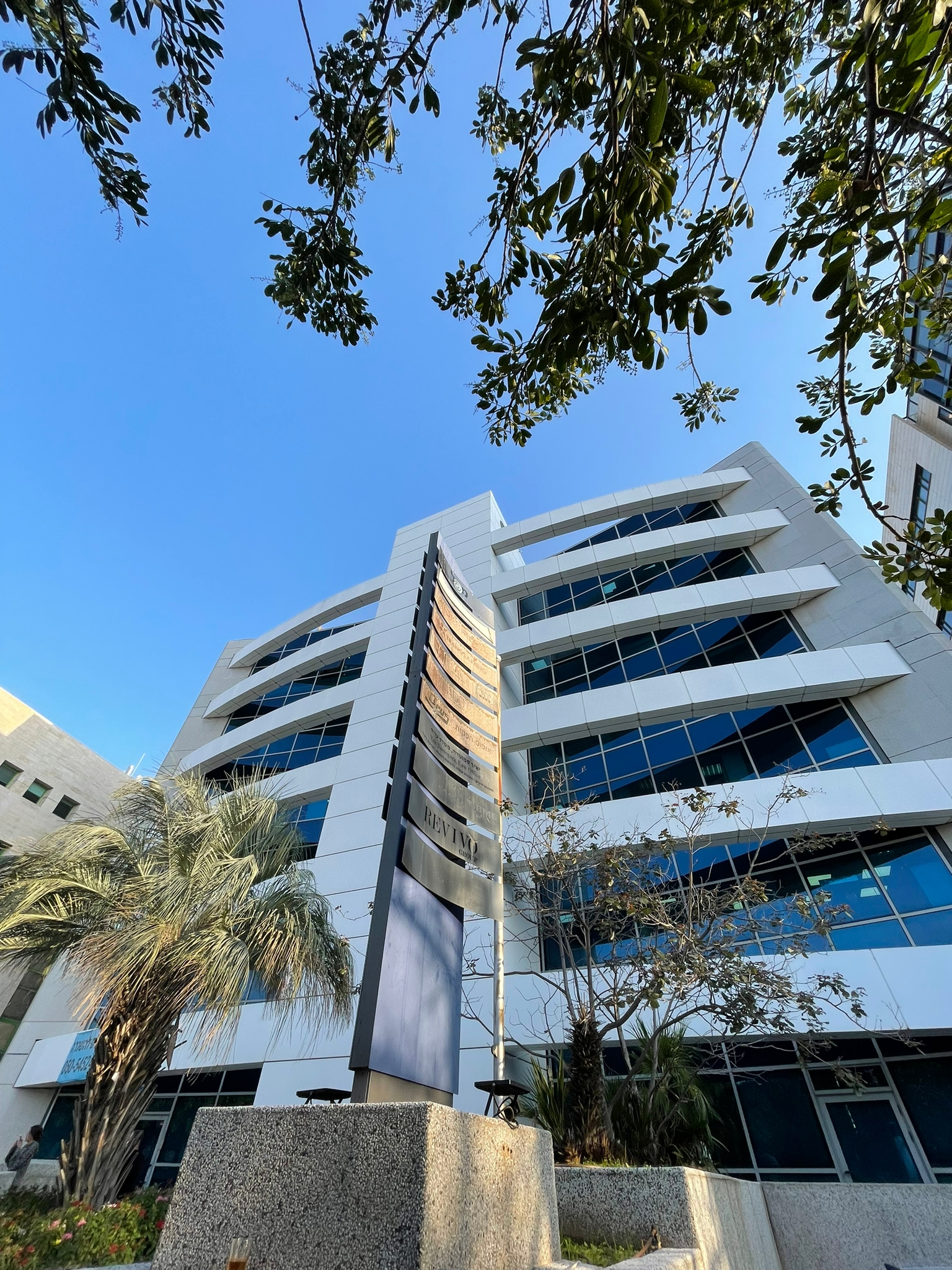
- Dori Media's office in Tel Aviv
- Industry: Media
- Founded: 1996; 30 years ago
- Founder: Yair Dori
- Headquarters: Tel Aviv, Israel
- Number of locations: 2
- Key people: Nadav Palti - CEO and President; Tamar Mozes Borovitz - Chairperson of the Board
- Subsidiaries: Tel Aviv; Dori Media Darset Ltd. Dori Media Paran Ltd. MeMeMe Studios Ltd. Zurich; Dori Media International GmbH
- Website: dorimedia.com

Dori Media Group Ltd. (DMG) is an international group of media companies, located in Tel Aviv, Israel and Zurich, Switzerland, with strong connection and long standing reputation in Latin America. The group produces and distributes TV series, films and digital content.

== History ==
Dori Media was founded in 1996 by Yair Dori (born in Buenos Aires 1947), who in the early 1990s started importing Argentine soaps to the Israeli market, which became a huge success; and led to the creation of cable channels, which dedicate themselves to air Latin soaps.

After the soap opera Chiquititas became a huge phenomenon in Israel, Dori approached producer Cris Morena about developing a new project. At the time, she was seeking finance for her new project, Rebelde Way. In 2001, he accepted an offer to invest in the project, which ended up being a success in Argentina and in Israel. Afterwards, it was sold to over 50 countries and was remade by Mexico (Rebelde) and India (Remix), among others. He also financed another Cris Morena project Rincon de Luz (2003).

In 2003 Morena decided not to produce a third season of Rebelde Way and produced Floricienta with production company RGB Entertainment, while Dori Media only got the distribution rights for it in East Europe. The company then started to co-produce with another Argentine companies; with Pol-ka, Dori Media produced Hombres de honor, Padre Coraje, Sos Mi Vida and Dr. Amor.; and with Central Park Productions SA, the highly successful Lalola; and in October 2007 acquired 50% of the company. In 2009 pilot for an American version of Lalola, entitled "Eva Adams", was filmed as a co-production with Sony Pictures Television, and Fox Broadcasting Company, starring Rhea Seehorn and James Van Der Beek, but wasn't picked up for a regular series.

On 21 March 2005, the company had an initial public offering (IPO) on the Alternative Investment Market of the London Stock Exchange, raising £3.23 million at a market value of £21.82 million, at a price of 118 pence per share; The share price reached a high of 190 pence during 2007, but later gone down below the level of the IPO.

In 2006, Dori Media produced its first TV Series in Argentina independently, El Refugio (de los Sueños); with part of the Rebelde Way cast and staff.

In 2007 Dori Media became the first telenovela partner channel on YouTube, which attracted more than 8m views, few weeks following its launch. Also in 2007 founder Yair Dori sold most of his shares in the company to Mapal Communications Ltd. and Miella Venture Partners Inc.

In 2009 Dori Media created a TV format, "uMan", a cross-platform realty show, where eight contestants enter a "Lab" for 21 days during which their every move is controlled by viewers. The format was sold to few broadcasters in Europe.

In May 2011 Dori Media delisted its shares from the London Stock Exchange.

In 2014 Dori Media established the first Multi-Channel Network in Israel - MeMeMe Studios. The company is engaged in the production and distribution of digital content for the Internet and initially via YouTube.

== TV Channels ==
In 1999 Dori Media established two cable channels in Israel, dedicated to airing Latin soaps: Viva and Viva Platina; which also produced the first local daily soap in Hebrew.

In Indonesia, the company established FMN and Baby TV (formerly known as Televiva). In April 2013, American television studio Sony Pictures Television acquired 50% of DMG's operations in Indonesia and in 2014 acquired 50% of the Viva and Viva Platina channels and the VIVA Walla online free video-on-demand (FVOD) service in Israel. The activity was transferred to a new company named Dori TLV. Following a successful period, Dori Media acquires back SPT's 50% stake in Dori TLV in 2020/2021.

In 2024, Dori Media sold to Telad Jerusalem Studios its subsidiaries Dori TLV, which operates, among others, the Viva channles, and Dori Media Ot, marking Dori Media's exit from the Israeli channels market.
