= Samper (singer) =

Juan Felipe Samper
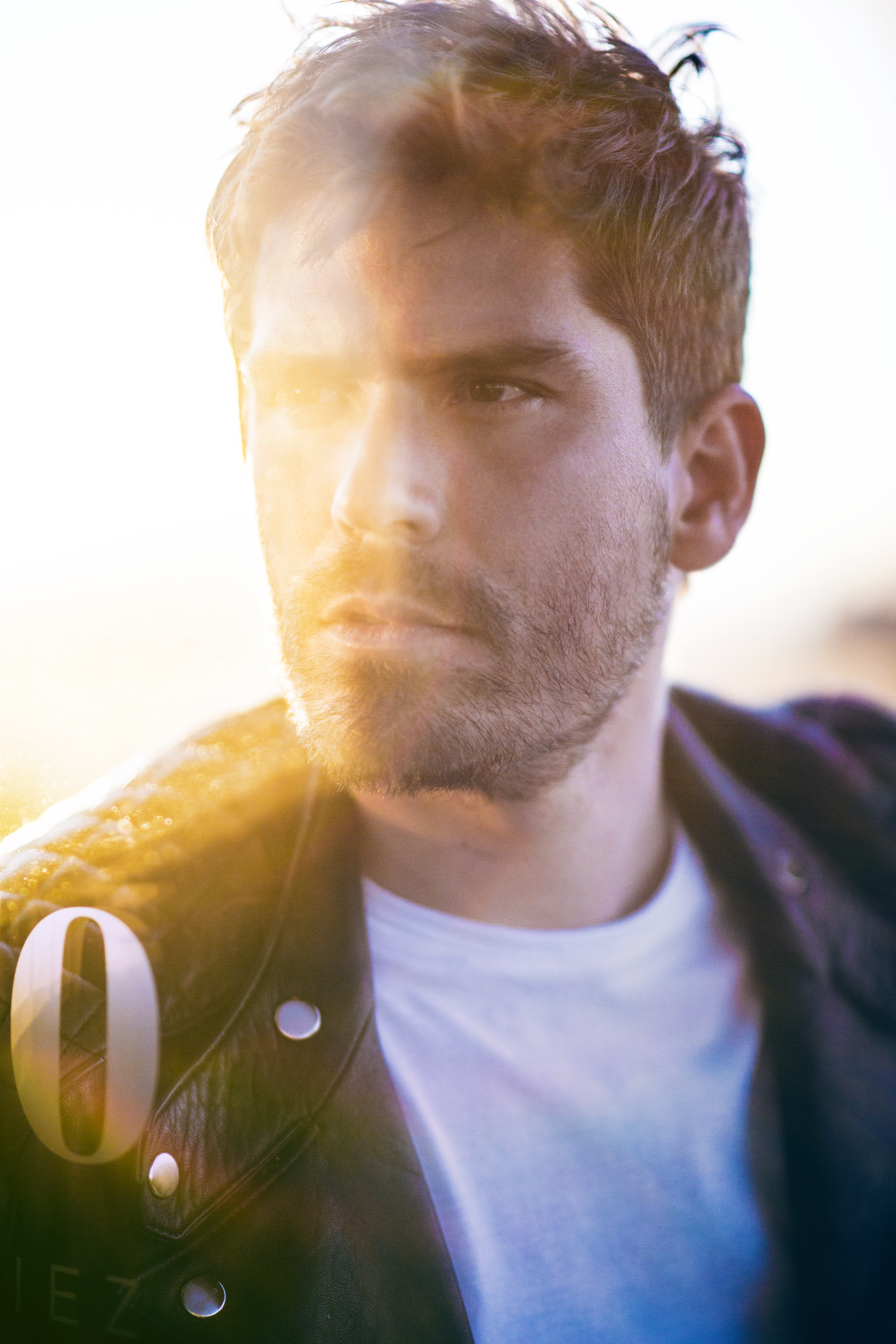
- Samper in 2017

Background information
- Also known as: SAMPER
- Born: Juan Felipe Samper Pérez; September 23, 1985 (age 41); Cali, Colombia
- Genres: Latin Rock; Latin; pop; rock
- Occupations: Musician; singer; songwriter
- Instruments: Voice; guitar; piano; drums
- Years active: 2003–present
- Labels: EMI Music (formerly); Independiente
- Website: juanfelipesamper.com

Juan Felipe Samper, better known just as Samper (often stylized as SAMPER; born September 23, 1985), is a Colombian musician, songwriter and pop rock singer. He is winner of 2 Premios Shock, 1 Premios Nuestra Tierra and Latin Grammy nominee.

== Biography ==
Samper was born on September 23, 1985, in Cali, Colombia. He is the son of Francisco Samper (publicist) and Beatriz Perez (business woman). He has 3 younger sisters, Maria, Cayetana and Eloisa; the two youngest are from his father's second marriage.

Throughout his childhood and adolescence he was a member of various musical group. He studied in Cali's musical conservatory conservatorio musical de Cali as a small boy and was also a member of the choir in his school. He was also part of "Misi" "Misi" (a musical theatre academy) and was part of various music ensembles of jazz, rock and punk during his school years mainly playing the drums.

At the end of high school years he founded the music band "Atabake" one of the pioneers of the tropipop musical genre in which he played drums and also sang a couple of songs. "Atabake" is remembered for songs like "Manuelita" and "A la media noche" both which were radio hits in Colombia. While he was in "Atabake" his time was also shared with his studies of musical production in Universidad de los Andes. He became a member of the famous Colombian band "Sin Animo de Lucro" with which he obtained many international nominations and recognitions such as a nomination for the Latin Grammys and 2 "Premios Shock" awards among others.

Samper is currently working his career as a solo artist and has released singles in Central America and in his home country Colombia.

== Sin Ánimo de Lucro ==
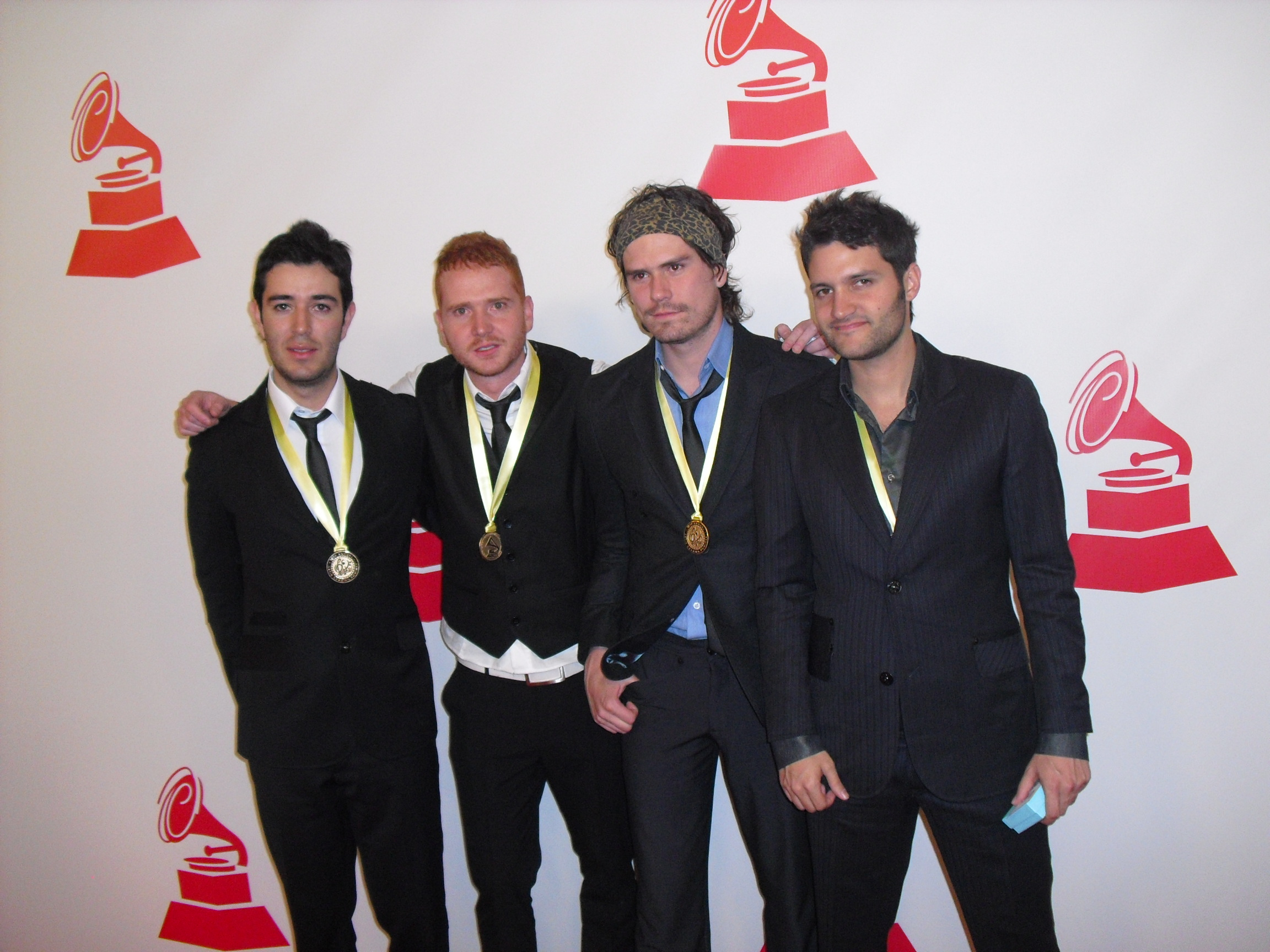
Latin Grammy Nominees 09' Sin Animo De Lucro

In year 2006 he became a member of Sin Animo de Lucro as lead singer and lead guitarist. The "master en parranda" tour presented shows in almost all of the Colombian territory, which led them to become one of the most important and significant bands in Colombia and they became one of the most renowned musicians in the tropipop genre. Their song "El parrandero" became a party anthem not only in Colombia but in several Latin American countries as well.

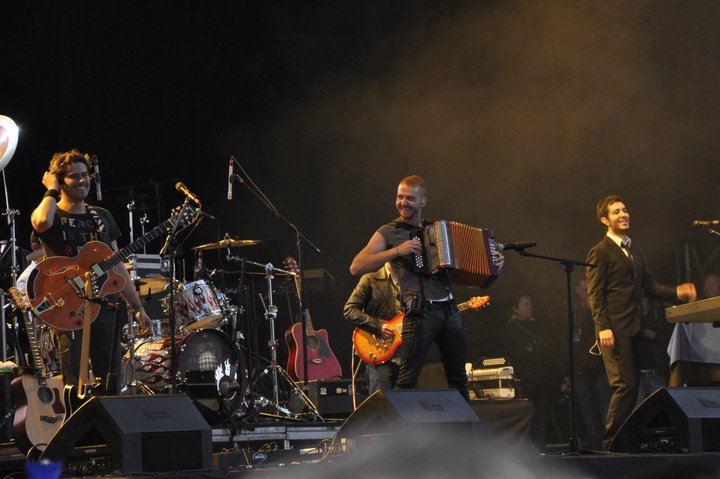
Sin Ánimo de Lucro Live in Bogotá 2011

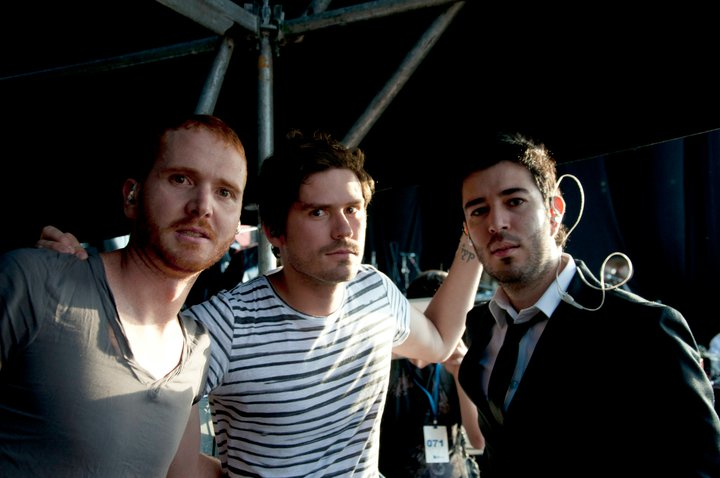
Sin Ánimo De Lucro @ the backstage for Nivea's 100 years. 2011 Parque Simón Bolívar, Bogotá Colombia

In 2009 the band recorded their second studio album ¨Todo pasa por algo" in Miami's "Criteria/The Hit Factory" studios and produced by several Latin Grammy, Grammy and ASCAP awards winner "Andrés Castro¨ (Carlos Vives, Reyli, ChocquibTown). They were awarded a "Gold record" in Colombia and 1 "Premio shock" for "best tropical pop band", a nomination for the "Premios 40 principales España" as "best Colombian pop band" and another nomination for the Latin Grammy for "Best Tropical Contemporary Album". All of this gave them international recognition and they toured in countries such as Ecuador, Peru, Costa Rica, Venezuela, Chile, Argentina and US amongst others.

"Sin Animo de Lucro" was sponsored and became image for some brands in Colombia like Tigo (Mobile), Totto (Accessories, Outwear), Chicles X-time (Chewing gum) and Aguardiente Nectar (Colombian Liquor).

In 2011 "Sin Animo De lucro" separated.

== Solo career ==
SAMPER is his name as a solo artist. His music has an immense influence from British Rock which was induced by his father since he was a young boy but off course mixed with his Latino roots.

In June 2013 he released his first single "Volver a empezar" produced by Jorge Holguin "Pyngwi". A song written towards the social reinsertion for the armed conflict in Colombia. The song hit the top of the juvenile radio charts in Bogota and managed to stay in the top 20 in "Fantastica Radio" and "La Mega". Later that year he received a nomination as "best new artist" in the Premios Shock de la música.

His second single release "Como te voy a olvidar" is a song co-written with Argentinian producer, writer "Ditto Reschinga" and his former bandmates of "Sin Animo De Lucro" (Santiago Hernández and Camilo Rivera). It was produced by famous composer, musician, sound engineer, record Label manager and 4 time Grammy Award producer Bernardo Ossa (Thalia, David Bisbal, Andres Cepeda, Fonseca) and Fernando ¨Toby¨ Tobon former member of Ekhymosis and also Juanes guitarist. In this song he mixes andean sounds, "cumbia" and Pop.

This song also had a remix called "Chucu-chucu version" co-produced by "Santiago Hernandez" and Samper himself.

In 2014 he won a premio nuestra tierra RCN.

In 2015 Samper released "No te vuelvo a perder". A classic rock ballad coproduced by him and "Tony Rijos" the renowned musical arranger and director for Ricardo Arjona and Prince Royce among others. It also features the participation of famous Latin musicians such as Guillermo Vadalá (Fito Páez), Michel Ferré (Lauryn Hill), Otto Ávalos (Ricardo Arjona) and Rodrigo Duarte. Recorded in Buenos Aires, Mexico City, Miami and Bogotá, mixed by "Bob St John" American producer for band Extreme and their famous song More Than Words.

In 2016's "Todo se puede arreglar", Samper produced once again with Pyngwi. This song features a classic rock sound and speaks about not giving up. Mixed by Jeff Juliano. He released it on national TV broadcast on the night of "Teletón Colombia".

In 2017 he released "Pensando en Ti" feat. L'Omy, one of Colombia's new reggaeton artists. The song was produced by Miguel "Yera" Ospino in Bogotá, Colombia. The single was really well received across the country but mostly in Guatemala and Central American countries. It features a pretty nice mix between Samper's pop sound and vocals and Latin America's deep and rich rhythmic beats.

In April 2017 he was hired as translator and vocal coach on Justin Bieber's Remix of Latin music smash hit single "Despacito" original by "Luis Fonsi" and "Daddy Yankee". They recorded the song in "Audiovisión studios" in Bogotá, Colombia

== Awards, honors and collaborations ==
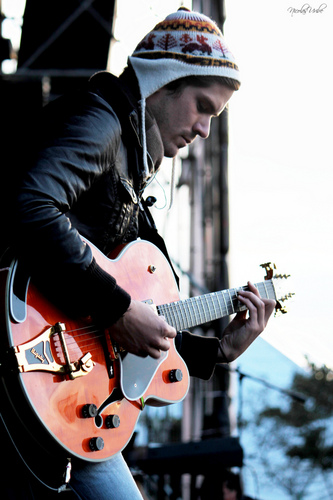
SAMPER soundcheck Simón Bolívar 2010

Latin Grammy

A Latin Grammy Award is an award by The Latin Academy of Recording Arts & Sciences to recognize outstanding achievement in the Latin music industry.

Year	Work	Category	Results
2009	Todo pasa por algo	Best Tropical Contemporary Album	Nominee

Premios Shock "Shock awards"

The Premios Shock are the awards by Colombia's music specialized magazine Shock.

Year	Nominated Artist	Category	Results
2006	Sin Ánimo de Lucro	Best New genre performance	Winner
2009	Sin Ánimo de Lucro	Best tropical pop band	Winner
2013	SAMPER	Best new artist	Nominee

Premios Nuestra Tierra

Premios Nuestra Tierra ("Our Homeland Awards") is an annual music award ceremony that takes place in Colombia which began in 2007. The awards are hosted by the RCN TV network.

Year	Nomination	Category	Results
2006	Sin ánimo de lucro	Premios Nuestra Tierra | Best audience artist	Nominee
2014	SAMPER	Premios Nuestra Tierra | Twitter – Industrie's social networker of the year	Winner

Gold Record

Music recording sales certification is a system of certifying that a music recording has shipped or sold a certain number of copies. The threshold quantity varies by type (such as album, single, music video) and by nation or territory (see List of music recording certifications).

Year	Work	Category	Results
2010	Todo pasa por algo – Sin ánimo de lucro	Gold Record in Colombia | Given by EMI Music	Winner

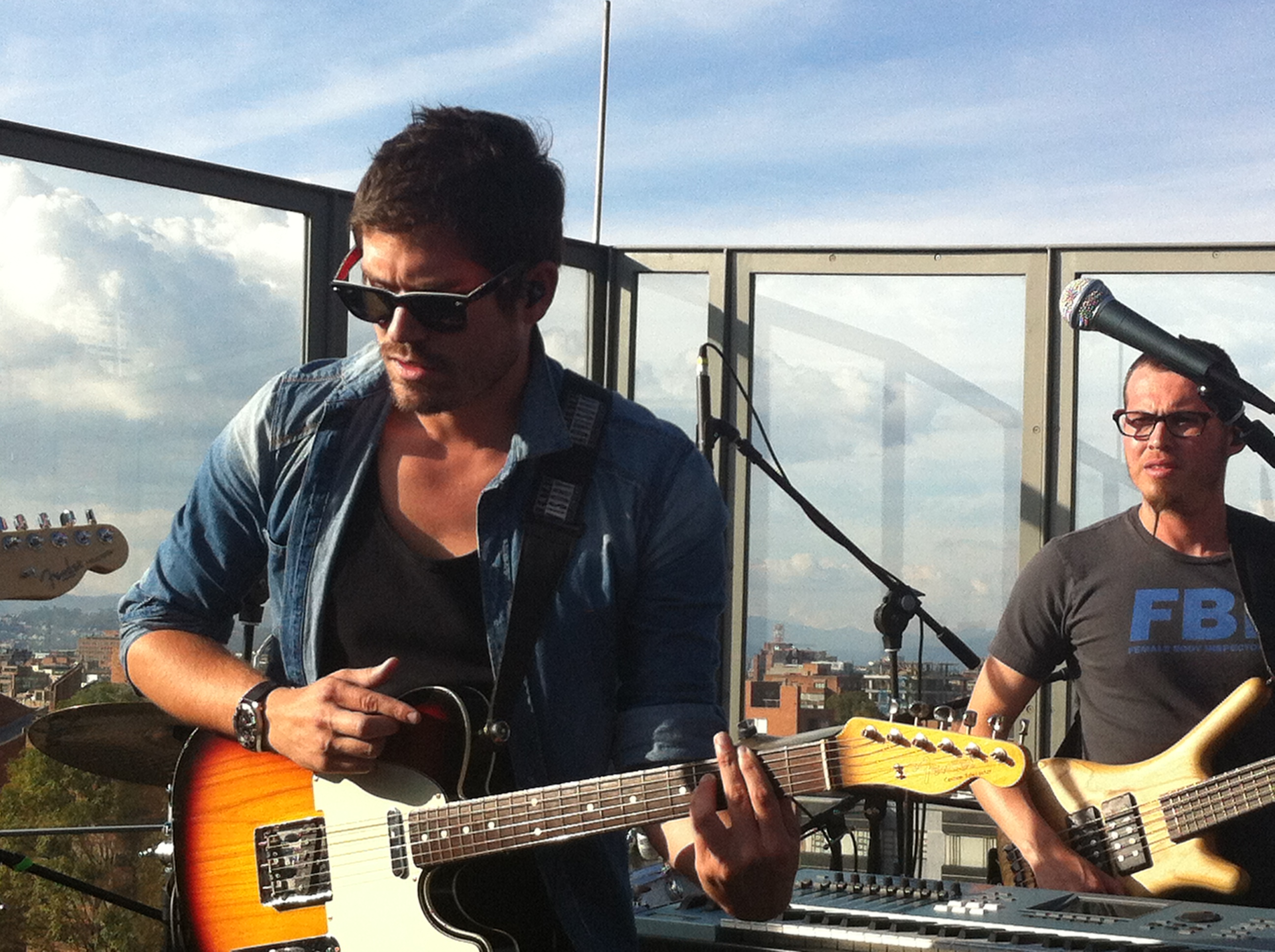
SAMPER, Bogotá 2014

Throughout his career he has also been invited by EMI Music to be a participate in Colombia's tribute to Coldplay in Bogota to celebrate their album Milo Xyloto, he was also invited to perform in "A Tribute to The Beatles", he was remarked as one of the musical promises in Colombia for the year 2013 by "Shock magazine", invited to feature in the song "Corazón Valiente" promoting peace campaign #SoyCapaz in Colombia next to many other recognized artists in the country. He was also invited to sing and perform a showcase at the "Bogotá Music Market 2014 BOmm" for being outstanding and "ready to export" Colombian music.

He has also been credited for recording back vocals in Andrés Cepeda's "Lo mejor que hay en mi vida", vocals for Colombian band SOUNDACITY, recorded along "Santiago Cruz" & Fonseca a song for the project "Colectivo Mente Consciente" and with "Sin Animo De Lucro" he was invited to sing in Iván Villazón's greatest hits album song "Se van bien" & "Volvernos a encontrar" SADL original song featuring Chilean band Kudai.

He is also co-writer and composer in SIAM's hit song "Big Bang" and was invited as pianist in Adriana Lucía's recording "Vuelvo a Respirar".

He was chosen by "Revista VEA" a popular magazine as one of the sexiest Colombians in 2014.

== Discography ==
- La Postal. Atabake, albúm (2005)
- Lo mío es nuestro. Single. Sin ánimo De Lucro (2007)
- Se van Bien, Grandes Éxitos, Iván Villazón, Sin Ánimo de lucro invitado albúm (2007)
- Todo Pasa Por Algo. Sin ánimo De Lucro, album (2008)
- Volver a Empezar, Single (2013)
- Cambian los colores, Dani del Corral, single. Invitado (2013)
- Cómo te voy a olvidar?, single (2014)
- Cómo te voy a olvidar? Chucu-chucu Version, single remix (2014)
- Big Bang. Siam. Compositor (2014)
- No te vuelvo a perder, single (2015)

== See also ==
- Music of Colombia
