= Lotería del crimen season 2 =

Lotería del crimen
- Season 2
- Starring: Sara Maldonado; Claudio Lafarga; Arnoldo Picazzo; Tamara Niño de Rivera; Francisco Vázquez; Jorge Fink; Alejandra Herrera; Tatiana del Real; Angélica Lara; Lupita Sandoval
- No. of episodes: 24

Release
- Original network: Azteca 7
- Original release: 6 November – 13 December 2023

Season chronology
- ← Previous; Season 1 Next → Season 3

The second season of the Mexican television series Lotería del crimen was announced on 18 January 2023. All starring cast members from the previous season returned with the exception of Julieta Grajales and Jerry Velázquez. Sara Maldonado and Alejandra Herrera joined the cast this season.

The season, consisting of 24 episodes, aired from 6 November 2023, to 13 December 2023, on Azteca 7.

== Cast ==
- Sara Maldonado as Ariel Aragón
- Claudio Lafarga as Bruno Barraza
- Arnoldo Picazzo as Eligio Enciso
- Tamara Niño de Rivera as Sofía Salabeth
- Francisco Vázquez as Ricardo Romero "El Recio"
- Jorge Fink as Tito Tavares
- Alejandra Herrera as Guadalupe "Gigi" González
- Tatiana del Real as Luisa López
- Angélica Lara as Nancy Delfina
- Lupita Sandoval as Marieta "Mari" Martínez

== Episodes ==
No. overall	No. in season	Title	Directed by	Written by	Original release date	Mexico viewers (millions)
25	1	"El Alpinista 2"	Carlos Carrera	Alfredo Mendoza	6 November 2023	0.81
After the death of Victoria at the hands of Kirios "El Alpinista", and with Yeyé and Tata wounded, the attorney demands that Eligio find El Alpinista. Two new detectives arrive at the UNIC, Ariel and Guadalupe. The UNIC detectives devise a plan to catch Alpinista before he kills them all. Cast : Víctor Civeira as Kirios Karras, Jaime Estrada as Eusebio Méndez, Roberto Montiel as Attorney Salabeth, Teresa Rábago as Carlota
26	2	"La Inversionista"	Carlos Carrera	Ana Romero	7 November 2023	0.72
A number of young men are being murdered in the city, and it appears that it may be a sex crime, but everything points to something else behind these murders. The suspect is an older woman who seems to be stalking young men in search of love, whom she lures by promising them money. Cast : Andrea Noli as Claudia, Jorge Veliz as Iker, Diego Garza as Chainman, Gonzalo de León as César, Catalina Salas as Eugenia, Constantino Caso as Manager, Maru Chirinos as Marta, Emmanuelle Águila as Josué, Renata Robles as Luz Ma, Cinthya Agatón as Alma, Alexandro Solís as Osvaldo, Bella as Odett
27	3	"La Taquera"	Carlos Carrera	Karen Espinal	8 November 2023	0.87
The UNIC team investigates the discovery of human bones in a dump. As the investigation progresses, they learn that homeless people have disappeared from a shelter. Cast : Martha Claudia Moreno as Doña Yola, Mario Cervantes as Rodolfo, Gabo Anguiano as Héctor, Javier Reyes Ríos as Luis, Norma Castañeda as Azucena, Esaú Ávila as Alonso, René Martínez as Indigent man, Nuria Frederick as Paloma, Mariana Meyer as Ivonne
28	4	"El Artista"	Carlos Carrera	Heriberto Mojica	9 November 2023	0.94
The UNIC investigates a crime committed by an anonymous hentai artist who executes his victims at the time of the exhibition of his work. Cast : Constantino Costas as Gastón, Carla Arredondo as Dessire, Saúl Amador as Pablo, Patricia Ugarte as Lily, Mónica Gutiérrez as Naty, Óscar M. Gómez as Don Polo, Alberto Yañez as Gonzalo, Nadia Vega as Judith, Sebastián Vera as Otaku
29	5	"La Luchadora"	Carlos Carrera	Ana Romero	13 November 2023	0.68
The UNIC investigates a series of murders among wrestlers. Recio infiltrates as a wrestler in the gym where the victims used to meet, but that's where he meets Carmen, a young woman who does the cleaning. Cast : Roberto Wohlmuth as Ramiro, Fernanda Rivera as Carmen, Conrado Mercado as Jeremías, Rodolfo Palacios as Pedro, Rosalinda Esparza as Gloria, Carlos Amador as Camilo, Vladimir Rivera as Supercable
30	6	"El Pelotero"	Carlos Carrera	Karen Espinal	14 November 2023	0.72
A baseball coach is found dead on a baseball field. Connecting the dots, the UNIC manages to gather some of the students and they realize that the murderer has a knowledge in anatomy. Cast : Ezequiel Cárdenas as Raúl, Enrique Vega as Don Tadeo, Carlos Ramírez Ruelas as Julio, Gustavo Melgarejo as César, Mafer Millán as Lorena, Joca Reyna as Salvador, Luis Loria as Paulo, Itzel Amador as Cristina
31	7	"La Florista"	Carlos Carrera	David Mascareño	15 November 2023	0.68
A murderer is killing married and unfaithful men, but decorates the bodies of their victims. Cast : Sandra Benhumea as Eloísa, Constanza Hernández as Rosy, Magdalena Barrón as Natalia, Diana Mercado as Diana, Daniel García as Alberto, Dinorah Bretón as Patricia, Fran Gallardo as Mauricio, Yigaell Yadín as Fernando, Jesús Téllez as Merchant, Álvaro Becof as Neighbor, Lucila Castrejón as Elderly woman, César Criollo as Eduardo, Arlaé Ramírez as Waitress
32	8	"El Carnicero"	Carlos Carrera	Heriberto Mojica	16 November 2023	0.83
The UNIC is searching for El Carnicero, a serial killer who kills popular teenagers who bully others, in revenge for the suicide of his overweight daughter. Cast : Orlando Moguel as Rubén, Bruno Pizá as Santiago, Rodrigo Cortés as Carlos, Gaby Solís as Romina, Lary Hernández as Laura, Grecia Tello as Antonia, Valerie Sosa as Valentina, Constanza Landón as Andrea, Coral Echevarría as Claudia
33	9	"La Corredora"	Carlos Carrera	Natalia Núñez Silvestri	20 November 2023	0.67
There is a killer on the loose who is murdering men from perfect families and planting evidence to turn their wives into suspects. Cast : Silvana Garriga as Marien, Cassandra Bisogno as Paula, Bárbara Falconi as Claudia, Karla Mora as Angélica, Rodrigo Goytortua as Carlos, Angélica Nieto as Yolanda, Pablo Domínguez as Felipe, Fernando Mitre as Paula's husband
34	10	"El Mecánico"	Carlos Carrera	Raúl Camarena	21 November 2023	N/A
A serial killer is on the loose, tricking women into letting him into their home so he can kill them in cold blood. After following many false leads, the UNIC discover that all the victims had an appointment with a mechanic. Cast : David Ponce as Omar, Robin Sanch as El Tuercas, Alejandra Duarte as Irma, Lety Grey as Yolanda, Maru Chirinos as Hilda
35	11	"La Exterminadora"	Carlos Carrera	Nora Coss	22 November 2023	0.74
The UNIC investigates a family killed with potent chemicals after requesting a fumigation against cockroaches. The clues lead them to a pro-bug cult that considers insects the next reincarnation of mankind. Cast : Mitzi Elizalde as Teresa, Carbie Álvarez as Homero, Rous Esparza as Carla, Caraly Sánchez as Cecilia, Guadalupe Rammath as Rosario, Gilberto Miranda as Ulises, Gil Zepeda as Ángel, Mauricio Sotomayor as Santi, José Alfaro as Benito
36	12	"La Candidata"	Carlos Carrera	Ana Romero	27 November 2023	0.88
The UNIC investigates a series of murders of women and uncover a human trafficking network. Torture, sexual exploitation and extortion through the kidnapping of children lead them to find an intimate relationship between these crimes, a help center for abused women, and the political campaign of an ambitious candidate. Cast : Iván Esquivel as Plutarco, Marco Aurelio Nava as Jorge, Alfredo Félix as Lola, Laura de Ita as Simona, Brisa Meza as Erandi, Anabel Sánchez Latif as Alicia, Blanca Ferreyra as Alicia's mother, Arturo Olivares as Roberto, Paty Torres as Britany, Areli as Violetita, Lalo Frey as Senator Huerta, Eliel de la O as Primitivo, Jennifer Estrella as Maru
37	13	"Los Cirqueros"	Carlos Carrera	Alfredo Mendoza	28 November 2023	0.69
Based on a child's complaint, the UNIC investigates the kidnapping of a man by a couple of clowns. As they follow the clues they discover the gradual disappearance and murders of a family of circus performers who went bankrupt and had to close the circus. Cast : Luis Fernando Peña as José, Karla Garrido as Eldemira, Fernando Santander as Dieguito, Juanpa López Mata as Pablito, Isabel Yudice as Virginia, Lupita Adriana as Doña Ovidia, Fausto Casanova as Juan Americo, Jesús Lozano as Manuel Yañez, Talia Marcela as Manuel's mother, Yam Acevedo as Africa Soler
38	14	"La Repartidora"	Carlos Carrera	Karen Espinal	29 November 2023	0.74
The UNIC investigates the death of a college student with an impeccable record in his apartment. When one of his best friends is killed in the same way, the UNIC sets out to find out why they are being murdered. The investigation leads them to a killer who is out for revenge. Cast : Nicolasa Ortiz Monasterio as Yolanda / Rosario, Aldo Santacruz as Mauricio, Majo Gutiérrez as María, Fredy Ricard as Rubén, Beatriz Cecilia as Rocío, Jorge Marín as Javier, Raúl Ortega as Iván, Zuleyka Rojo as Azucena
39	15	"La Camarista"	Carlos Carrera	Heriberto Mojica	4 December 2023	0.67
The UNIC is investigating several homicides in motels of men whose throats were slit and whose tongues were cut out and left on their chests. The investigation leads them to find that the main relationship between the victims was a woman who seduced the men who traveled alone and were snitches. Cast : Chaps Torres as Saúl, Mónica Guzmán as Lilia, Pablo Mendoza as Julio, Joshua Sotomayor as Tomás, Fernanda Núñez as Lorena, Hernan Romo as Abraham, Eduardo Córdoba as Sotelo
40	16	"El Procurador"	Carlos Carrera	David Mascareño	4 December 2023	0.55
The UNIC pursues the dagger killer, but his victims have no obvious connection. He seems to kill at random. The UNIC investigates without telling Sofía because a surveillance camera caught her father, the attorney, at the scene and they consider him a suspect. Everything points to the attorney, who is missing, but Sofía assures that her father is innocent, that it is possible that the murderer kidnapped him. She investigates on her own and finds the connection between the victims: all of them were charged with murder, were released and were the attorney's cases. Cast : Roberto Montiel as Attorney Salabeth, Emmanuel Okaury as Arturo, Dan Alvarado as Gil, Judith Hernández as Martha, Mauricio Rivas as Ignacio Peralta, Valentina Bouchot as Arlet
41	17	"La Psiquiatra"	Carlos Carrera	Natalia Núñez Silvestri	5 December 2023	0.77
The UNIC investigates a series of deaths in a psychiatric hospital. A psychiatric doctor is the main suspect and a teenage girl the only witness. Cast : Gabriela Macías as Lucinda, Pepe Navarrete as Rosalio, Sara Maldonado as Damaris, Jorge Nava as Mr. Villa, Paola Pérez-Rea as Mrs. Villa, Verónica Jalil as Graciela, Stella Fink as Elda
42	18	"El Continuista"	Carlos Carrera	Ana Romero	5 December 2023	0.79
The UNIC investigates a series of deaths related in some way to the zodiac signs. When they find the pattern reproduced by the killer, they discover that the order has to do with the elements of each sign, an apocalyptic ritual and the young victims' passion for poetry. Cast : Sergio Klainer as Gerardo, Ximena Llaguno as Jessica, Erick Tirado as Leo, María Garagarza as Gladys, Mauricio Roldán as Héctor, Andrea Camacho as Jimena, Alejandro Ainslie as Elías, Darío Palacio as Marín, Obeth Torres as Tilín, Diego Enríquez as Brayan, Fernanda Pons as Dalina, Laura Pons as Susana
43	19	"El Inventor"	Carlos Carrera	Alfredo Mendoza	6 December 2023	0.69
The UNIC investigates the murders of the only children of three very wealthy families. When they find the connection, a powerful fertilizer company, they discover a secret pact that once left one of the inventors of the fertilizer out of the equation. Cast : Isra Perettz as Cristobal, David Palazuelos as Ramón, Edgar Omar Moreno as Ernesto, Fernanda Hernández as Lorena, Mario Loría as Ascencio Mendoza, Carlos Álvarez as Roberto Andueza, Laura Sotelo as Elsa Andueza, Rafa Pineda as Adolfo Torres de la Garza, Socorro Miranda as Carmen Torres de la Garza, Constantino Morán as Pedro Vianello, Gabriela Bermudez as Alma Vianello, Noah as Santiago de la Fuente, Ricky Beck as Emiliano
44	20	"La Lavandera"	Carlos Carrera	Nora Coss	11 December 2023	0.74
The UNIC investigates the murders of several neighborhood young men who have been massacred and brutally tortured. As they track down the gangs in the area, they discover that the neighbors, fed up with crime, tend to seek justice with their own hands. Cast : Claudia Frías as Doña Romina, Fernando Gaviria as Inspector Valencia, Luis Ambrosio Soler as José, Omar Adair as Julio, Hatzin Navarrete as Kevin, Alberto García as Adrián, Diana Reséndiz as Doña Cleo, Mario León as Don Lalo, Vicente Ferrer as Administrator, Alex Rei as Armando, Alejandro Rumart as Calixto, Victoria Sevilla as Martha, Noemí Cervantes as Chayo
45	21	"La Curtidora"	Carlos Carrera	Raúl Camarena	11 December 2023	0.74
The UNIC investigates a series of murders of young and beautiful women who appear to have been skinned. Sofia offers herself as a decoy. Cast : María Goycoolea as Ramona, Nicole de Saro as Model, Cristián Gerardo Martínez as Chef, Aral Montoya as Agent, Javier Centeno as Fruit vendor, Eduardo Alcantar as Street sweeper, Eli de Jauregui as Tattoo artist
46	22	"El Carpintero"	Carlos Carrera	Alfredo Mendoza	12 December 2023	0.68
The UNIC investigates a series of devotional crimes related to a parish. As the investigation progresses, they discover victims dating back years; the main suspect may be dead, but someone is continuing his job. Cast : Julio Casado as David, Eligio Meléndez as Tomás, Alan Soto as Hernán, Santiago Vega as Chuy, Alejandro Raffel as Deacon Fontana, Jorge Richards as Attorney Hierro, Adelina Maviro as Shanay, Fer Villareal as Deyanara, Montserrat Benasco as Doña Mati, Sofía Monroy as Doña Cleo, Luisa Dander as Doña Licha
47	23	"El Carpintero 2"	Carlos Carrera	Ana Romero	13 December 2023	0.74
The UNIC follows the carpenter and when they discover that he intends to represent the Stations of the Cross of Jesus, the UNIC must follow the trail of death he leaves behind, until the pieces come together and, at the last moment, they must save Recio's life. Cast : Julio Casado as David, Eligio Meléndez as Tomás, Alan Soto as Hernán, Santiago Vega as Chuy, Alejandro Raffel as Deacon Fontana, Montserrat Benasco as Doña Mati, Sofía Monroy as Doña Cleo, Luisa Dander as Doña Licha, Armando Moreno as Saúl Gómez
48	24	"La Reportera"	Carlos Carrera	Alfredo Mendoza	13 December 2023	0.77
Luisa López arrives before everyone else at an accident in which two young women are seriously injured. Luisa needs dead people for the front page of the newspaper and unhesitatingly kills one of the girls, while leaving the other one for dead. Meanwhile, Recio, hospitalized after the carpenter's case, recovers in the hospital. There he meets Lorena, who is the survivor of the accident and assures that her friend was murdered. After investigating, Recio and the other UNIC agents suspect an opportunistic killer. The investigation leads them to discover too many coincidences between Luisa López and the reports of accidents with injured people who ended up dead. Cast : Tatiana del Real as Luisa López "La Meti", Raquel Vargas as Lorena, Edson Franco as Andrés, Jessica Rincón as Catalina, Roberto Leyva as Dr. Gutiérrez, Martín Casanova as Dr. Carrera

== Production ==
=== Development ===
On 18 January 2022, TV Azteca renewed Lotería del crimen for a second season. Filming of the season began in May 2023.

=== Casting ===
In February 2023, Sara Maldonado was cast as Ariel Aragón.
