= Lotería del crimen season 4 =

Lotería del crimen
- Season 4
- Starring: Sara Maldonado; Claudio Lafarga; Arnoldo Picazzo; Cuauhtli Jiménez; Tamara Niño de Rivera; Alejandra Herrera; Lupita Sandoval
- No. of episodes: 24

Release
- Original network: Azteca 7
- Original release: 2 June – 10 July 2025

Season chronology
- ← Previous; Season 3

The fourth season of the Mexican television series Lotería del crimen was announced in January 2025. All starring cast members from the previous season returned with the exception of Francisco Vázquez and Jorge Fink. Cuauhtli Jiménez joined the cast as Detective Marco Mora. The season, consisting of 24 episodes, aired from 2 June 2025 to 10 July 2025, on Azteca 7.

== Cast ==
=== Main ===
- Sara Maldonado as Ariel Aragón
- Arnoldo Picazzo as Eligio Enciso
- Claudio Lafarga as Bruno Barraza
- Cuauhtli Jiménez as Marco Mora
- Tamara Niño de Rivera as Sofía Salabeth
- Alejandra Herrera as Guadalupe "Gigi" González
- Lupita Sandoval as Marieta "Mari" Martínez

=== Recurring and guest stars ===
- Ianis Guerrero as Mendoza
- Roberto Montiel as Attorney Salabeth
- Laura de Ița as Simona
- Kristal Silva
- Ruy Senderos as Jerry
- Juan Carlos Colombo as Higinio "El Forense"
- Mauro Sánchez Navarro as Boris Buendía

== Episodes ==
No. overall	No. in season	Title	Directed by	Written by	Original release date	Mexico viewers (millions)
73	1	"El Machetero 2"	Carlos Carrera	Alfredo Mendoza	2 June 2025	1.28
With Ariel arrested and accused of murders she did not commit, as well as El Recio dead, the UNIC is shut down and the remaining detectives work illegally to find the people behind what appears to be a manhunt for each of them. Cast: Ianis Guerrero as Mendoza, Laura de Ița as Simona, Adrián Flores as Felipe, Roberto Montiel as Attorney Salabeth, Leo Tejeda as Bujes, Marco Aurelio Nava as Jorge
74	2	"La Costurera"	Carlos Carrera	David Mascareño	3 June 2025	1.41
The UNIC is still looking for a way to get Ariel out of jail. A criminal attacks police officers and snitches who are arrested in the prison where Ariel is. When the UNIC learns that an attempt had been made to assassinate Ariel, they get Gigi and Sofía to enter the prison undercover, on one hand to protect Aragon and on the other to start investigating who the attacker was. Gigi, Sofia and Ariel discover that the attacker is the prison seamstress, who was kindly welcoming new inmates inside the prison to help them get sewing jobs, while being in cahoots with an important person in the government, and following their orders so that no one could trace them. Ariel is found innocent of the charges against her and is released from prison. Cast: Fernanda Monroy as Amelia, Roberto Montiel as Attorney Salabeth, Ixchel Flores as La Marchanta, Rocío Gallardo as Úrsula, Matilde Castañeda as Fátima, Andrea Parra as Josefa, Gabriela Melgoza as Santina "La Costurera", Laura García as Elena, Jacqueline Huitrón as Denis, Azalia Ortíz as Gori
75	3	"El Machetero 3"	Carlos Carrera	Alfredo Mendoza	4 June 2025	1.53
With Ariel out of jail, the arrival of Marco Mora and the return of Doña Mari, the UNIC seems to be stronger than before but El Machetero is still at large. The detectives come to the conclusion that El Machetero is Inspector Mendoza, who turns out to be a corrupt cop working on behalf of "La Candidata". Mendoza, in a loss of control, kidnaps an officer on a bicycle patrol, and sends a message to the entire UNIC: either he gives himself up with dignity, or he kills every member of the unit one by one. In a raid, the UNIC has a face-to-face confrontation with La Candidata's men, and in an intense chase, Detective Bruno is the one who manages to arrest him. Cast: Ianis Guerrero as Mendoza, Roberto Montiel as Attorney Salabeth, Jonatan Molina as Joel, Laura de Isa as Simona, Jimena de María as Olivia, Jassiel Cruz as Ulises
76	4	"La Candidata 2"	Carlos Carrera	David Mascareño	5 June 2025	1.79
The UNIC receives the case of a girl who had been dragged to death on the ground after fleeing from the trafficking ring run by Simona Arias. While trying to arrest Simona, things get out of control because she ends up getting killed by several shots when she tries to attempt against the lives of the UNIC detectives, accusing them of having killed her son, something that her partner in crime, El Machetero, had actually done. In the investigation, another accomplice of Simona's is arrested: Ramiro Matamoros, an official in charge of public security in Mexico City, who apparently had a close relationship with the criminal and also helped her hide the ring she had been operating for many years. Cast: Ianis Guerrero as Mendoza, Roberto Montiel as Attorney Salabeth, Jonatan Molina as Joel, Laura de Isa as Simona, Jimena de María as Olivia, Jassiel Cruz as Ulises
77	5	"La Salvadora"	Carlos Carrera	Ana Romero	9 June 2025	1.38
A criminal stalks elderly people who are unable to fend for themselves and murders them, leaving a rosary bead with them. The UNIC manages to find the house where the woman they name "La Salvadora" lives and arrest her just after she has killed her mother. Cast: Claudia Trejo as Teresa, Robin César as Fito, Lucía Carmen Cano as Lorena, Rosita Bouchot as Raquel, Diane Vázquez as Georgina, Brenda Cruz as Sonia, Anghelo López as Ramón, Carmen del Valle as Clara
78	6	"El Comediante"	Carlos Carrera	Nora Coss	10 June 2025	1.42
Witnesses report the appearance of male bodies on the street, with what appears to be a note in which the murderer had written a joke. The two victims, beaten to death and poisoned with pulverized glass, had met to attend a comedy show together. With these two clues, the UNIC begins to investigate and are led to a stand up comedian named Vito, but is ruled out as a suspect. Using Vito, Detective Bruno infiltrates a comedy show, managing to establish a link with Jerry, the murderer the UNIC has been looking for. Bruno is invited to Jerry's business, and once there he manages to arrest him with the help of the other detectives. They also declare the space as a crime scene, suspecting that this is where he killed his victims. They manage to free Jerry's uncle, who was tied to a beam and severely beaten, and according to testimonies it was because he told his nephew that he was not a good comedian, and that no one would laugh at his jokes, something that Jerry did not take well. Cast: Ruy Senderos as Jerry, Terence Strickman as Hugo, Lucía Carmen Cano as Lorena, Rosita Bouchot as Raquel, Diane Vázquez as Georgina, Brenda Cruz as Sonia, Anghelo López as Ramón, Carmen del Valle as Clara
79	7	"El Borracho"	Carlos Carrera	Heriberto Mojica	11 June 2025	1.47
The UNIC receives a case that apparently has no reason to have been assigned to them; the case of a drunk who had died of alcohol congestion. Bruno and Marco decide to investigate on their own and take the deceased victim to the morgue where coroner Marieta determines that in addition to alcohol in his body there was a substance known as poppers, which apparently had been ingested. When another body with the same conditions arrives at the UNIC, the detectives begin an intense investigation. And from bar to bar, the UNIC comes across a witness who leads them to a 6-step manual to overcome addictions. With this search they manage to reach an Alcoholics Anonymous leader, who prepared the drinks with drugs and alcohol that ended up killing the victims. Cast: Pablo Fulgueira as Alfonso, Carlos Shock Luna as Mario, Juan Carlos Terreros as Raúl, Darío Cisneros as Joseph, José Luis Meneses as Lupillo, María del Sol as Jacinta, Luis Fernando Mayagoitia as Emilio Enciso
80	8	"La Cazadora"	Carlos Carrera	Raúl Camarena	12 June 2025	1.35
The UNIC must go into the forest after discovering the remains of a poacher at a ritual scene. Their investigations uncover an online business reserved only for expert hunters. The mysterious inhabitants of the area are hiding the person they call "The Devil," who is actually "La Cazadora", a woman who kills poachers to protect innocent animals. Cast: Bea Ranero as Tatiana Serrano, Gonzalo García as Hunter X, Andrea de Alva as Margarita, Franclo Breit as Mohicano, Miguel Mena as Carlos, Joe Herrera as Mauricio,
81	9	"El Forense"	Carlos Carrera	Ana Romero	16 June 2025	1.23
Exposed bodies are found throughout Mexico City, all of which appeared to have been thoroughly examined. They reach Doña Mari, who carefully examines each one and finds that they died while undergoing an autopsy while still alive. Days pass, and more bodies continue to be reported, until Doña Mari notices a peculiarity: a specific knot at the end of an incision. Doña Mari searches for the man who recently donated new equipment to the morgue: her ex-husband, who turns out to be threatening people's lives and leaving their bodies visible to everyone as a way of trying to communicate with Doña Mari. The UNIC agents managed to arrest him before he could kill Doña Mari. Cast: Juan Carlos Colombo as Higinio "El Forense", Mauro Sánchez Navarro as Boris Buendía, María Luisa Vega as Valeria, Sara Manni as Lolita, Payín Cejudo as Meche, Cocone Toledo as Beatríz, Julio Ilhuicatl as Marcial, Gabriel Sedglach as Facundo
82	10	"Los Abuelos"	Carlos Carrera	Karen Espinal	17 June 2025	1.33
In an anonymous report, the UNIC receives a report of the discovery of the body of what appears to be an abandoned elderly person. The detectives note that the body was a young man who had been burned with acid, allegedly intended to make him appear elderly. Another body is reported, this time a woman, who suffered the same burns. With this information, the UNIC begins interviewing the parents of the victims, who, coincidentally, are all elderly. They mourn the death of their children but do not want to pursue the investigation further. The UNIC arrives at a senior care center, where they meet an elderly woman who lost her daughter. She gives them a clue: she mentions that "the children" had come to visit her, from which they conclude that there are two perpetrators. In a heated altercation, detectives Ariel and Bruno search a home that turns out to belong to the murderers, two brothers who were trying to avenge their eldest brother, who died due to the negligence of his own children, whom they also murdered. Cast: Mauro Sánchez Navarro as Boris Buendía, Fernando Banda as Eladio, Iván Bronstein as Gregorio, Perfecto González as Joaquín Luna, Alan Ruíz as Gonzalo, Ofelia Guiza as Susana, Toya Gerbolini as Aurora, Claudia Dueñas as Viviana, Adonay Cabrera as Alejandro
83	11	"La Trituradora"	Carlos Carrera	Nora Coss	18 June 2025	1.54
Cast: Mauro Sánchez Navarro as Boris Buendía, Mar Torrentera as Denisse, Armando Tapia as Dr. Sánchez Mares, Esdras Ugalde as Antonio Bosques, Majo León as Alma Cazares, Fernanda Beltrán as Abigail, Jaime de la Torre Bravo as Mauricio, Alberto Castillo as Pedro, Andrea Peláez Zárate as Magda
84	12	"El Aprendiz"	Carlos Carrera	Heriberto Mojica	19 June 2025	1.36
Cast: Mauro Sánchez Navarro as Boris Buendía, Gabriela Barajas as Emma Alcántara, Emma Solórzano as Vicky, Denis Castillo as Carmen, Paco Peralta as Amador, Mateo Montes as Jesús, Canek Enríquez as Martín
85	13	"El Coctelero"	Carlos Carrera	David Mascareño	23 June 2025	1.56
86	14	"La Zapatera"	Carlos Carrera	Ana Romero	24 June 2025	1.59
87	15	"La Roomie"	Carlos Carrera	Nora Coss	25 June 2025	1.52
88	16	"Los Segadores"	Carlos Carrera	Raúl Camarena	26 June 2025	1.44
89	17	"El Cadenero"	Carlos Carrera	David Mascareño	30 June 2025	1.42
90	18	"La Soldadora"	Carlos Carrera	Heriberto Mojica	1 July 2025	1.25
91	19	"Los Carnívoros"	Carlos Carrera	Karen Espinal	2 July 2025	1.38
92	20	"El Trepanador"	Carlos Carrera	Nora Coss	3 July 2025	1.58
93	21	"La Inquisidora"	Carlos Carrera	Ana Romero	7 July 2025	1.48
94	22	"El Conchero"	Carlos Carrera	Heriberto Mojica	8 July 2025	1.71
95	23	"El Cupido"	Carlos Carrera	Alfredo Mendoza	9 July 2025	1.67
96	24	"El Mercenario"	Carlos Carrera	Alfredo Mendoza	10 July 2025	1.52
