= Lotería del crimen season 1 =

Lotería del crimen
- Season 1
- Starring: Claudio Lafarga; Julieta Grajales; Arnoldo Picazzo; Francisco Vázquez; Tamara Niño de Rivera; Lupita Sandoval; Jerry Velázquez; Jorge Fink; Tatiana del Real; Angélica Lara
- No. of episodes: 24

Release
- Original network: Azteca 7
- Original release: 10 October – 17 November 2022

Season chronology
- Next → Season 2

The first season of the Mexican television series Lotería del crimen follows a group of detectives who must uncover several murderers who are on the loose in Mexico City. The season stars an ensemble cast featuring Claudio Lafarga, Julieta Grajales, Arnoldo Picazzo, Francisco Vázquez, Tamara Niño de Rivera, Lupita Sandoval, Jerry Velázquez, Jorge Fink, Tatiana del Real and Angélica Lara.

The season, consisting of 24 episodes, aired from 10 October 2022, to 17 November 2022, on Azteca 7.

== Cast ==
=== Main ===
- Claudio Lafarga as Bruno Barraza
- Julieta Grajales as Victoria Vargas
- Arnoldo Picazzo as Eligio Enciso
- Francisco Vázquez as Ricardo Romero "El Recio"
- Tamara Niño de Rivera as Sofía Salabeth
- Lupita Sandoval as Marieta "Mari" Martínez
- Jerry Velázquez as Jonathan Yáñez
- Jorge Fink as Tito Tavares
- Tatiana del Real as Luisa López
- Angélica Lara as Nancy Delfina

=== Recurring and guest stars ===
- Teresa Rábago as Carlota
- Tomás Goros as Licenciado Galdiño
- Tamara Guzmán as Flor
- Socorro de la Campa as Margarita
- Saúl Canales as Kirios Karras
- Anna Ciocchetti as Constanza
- Jorge Luis Vázquez as Diego Barraza
- Evangelina Sosa as Yessica
- Evangelina Martínez as Elodia
- José Sefami as Dr. Bolaños
- Roberto Montiel as The Attorney
- Pilar Ixquic Mata as Piedad
- Daniel Tovar as Raymundo Zoroastro
- María del Carmen Farías as Socorro
- Mauricio Pimentel as Camilo

== Episodes ==
No. overall	No. in season	Title	Directed by	Written by	Original release date	Mexico viewers (millions)
1	1	"El Brujo"	Carlos Carrera	Alfredo Mendoza	10 October 2022	0.48
A couple while fighting in their car, crash their car against a pillar in the parking lot, and discover a corpse, the case remains in the hands of the UNIC agents who will try to discover the facts of the crime committed, who after a long search find someone important in construction who sacrifices workers so that the construction remains standing in the face of any earthquake or any other disaster. Cast: Teresa Rábago as Carlota, Carlos Hendrick as Ismael, Kariam Castro as Tania, Alejandro Caso as Licenciado Solares, Alberto Amador as Ismael Buitrón, Tomás Goros as Licenciado Galdiño, Alan Curtis as Juan, Viridiana Barbosa as María, Axhai Vizcaíno as Child María
2	2	"El Huérfano"	Carlos Carrera	Ana Romero	11 October 2022	0.57
In a theater, an actress is murdered and the UNIC agents have to investigate the events as they happened to decipher the murderer of this actress, who after hard work discover that the murderer was one of the cleaning women of the theater, who reveals the identity of the other murderer. Cast: Leticia Texidor as Alessandra, Tamara Guzmán as Flor, Carlos Pohls as Martín, Vera Rivas as Joan, Socorro de la Campa as Margarita, Francisco Chapa as Felipe, Sergio Suárez as Alberto, Issac Vallejo as Albertito, Verónica García as Nun, Saúl Canales as Kirios Karras
3	3	"El Fotógrafo"	Carlos Carrera	Ricardo Avilés	12 October 2022	0.69
After the fall of a young woman from the rooftop of a residential building in the presence of two people, Salabeth has to discover with the help of Victoria and Bruno they try to discover someone who turns out to be a photographer who has taken photos of different young womans and who turns out that said suicide was nothing more than the kidnapping treatment by this photographer. Cast: Getsemaní Vela as María José, Pablo de la Rosa as Bernardo, Fernando Manzano as Gustavo, Anna Ciocchetti as Constanza, Sofía Marcel as Fernanda, Rodolfo Zarco as Juan
4	4	"El Matraquero"	Carlos Carrera	Heriberto Mujíca	13 October 2022	0.56
In a hotel a suitcase is found with a corpse, which has signs of having been tortured to death, Bruno and Victoria have to discover who the murderer is since another similar case had occurred in another hotel, after having interrogated several possible suspects, find him about to murder someone else and arrest him in time. Cast: Bárbara González as Laura, Hugo Luna as José, Mauricio Núñez Nava as Mr. Ramírez, Jorge Luis Vázquez as Diego Barraza, Manuel Villegas as Ramiro, Javier Zaragoza as Sebas, Leonardo Amézquita as Clemente, Miguel Islas as Gonzálo, Octavio Vega as Juan
5	5	"La Tóxica"	Rodrigo Hernández Cruz	Celia Kim	17 October 2022	0.57
A young man enters into the UNIC police station and reveals that he murdered his mother and grandmother, when questioning him he does not reveal anything and only remains silent, they also interrogate a girl who does not reveal anything about the boy, over time he boy reveals that the girl is the murderer and they manage to catch her in time to poison someone else. Cast: Erick Israel Consuelo as Elías, Karen Furlong as Alicia, Irving Aranda as Miguel
6	6	"Los Enamorados"	Rodrigo Hernández Cruz	Paulina Barros	18 October 2022	0.55
Some children discover a pointed foot, Bruno and Victoria discover an offering in a park and interrogate a crazy homeless man who reveals that they always bring offerings to the altar, after thinking of several suspects, they interrogate a store owner who reveals the strange way of acting of a couple, after having them suspicious, they manage to capture them, and it turns out that they cooked their victims. Cast: Carlos Balderrama as Mateo, Evangelina Sosa as Yessica, Aleida Flores as Rosa, Tonatiuh Salazar as Guillermo, Frida Nicole as Marcela, Minerva Velasco as María Rosa
7	7	"El Tatuador"	Carlos Carrera	Adrián Mazoy	19 October 2022	0.78
The owner of a dog is found hanging from a dog rope, after finding other victims over time, these are signed with different names with a pen, after thinking of a few suspects, Tito Tavares' wife gives him a dog but he cannot take care of him and after he escaped and went for him and took him to the vet, he asked him to take care of him, Tito is captured by the vet who before killing him, the vet is captured and arrested. Cast: Carlos Herrera as Rigoberto, Particia Caloca as Jennifer, Evangelina Martínez as Elodia, José Sefami as Dr. Bolaños, Fabián Merlo as Axel, Alejandro Raffel as Justino, Vieshna García as Julieta
8	8	"El Ejecutivo"	Carlos Carrera	Adrián Ortega Echegollén	20 October 2022	0.64
In an abandoned warehouses inhabited by homeless people, the cremated corpse is found with 1,000 pesos, first it is thought that it was made by one of the homeless to steal the money, after questioning one of them he reveals that someone gives them an amount based on no matter how much his body resists, a homeless friend of Yeye's before ending the same, they manage to arrest the murderer who wears an executive suit. Cast: Rodolfo Arias as Gustavo, Alberto Trujillo as Licenciado Barrera, Augusto Granados as Chucho, Lorena Moreno as La Morra, Roberto Montiel as Attorney
9	9	"La Casera"	Carlos Carrera	Alfredo Mendoza	24 October 2022	0.54
In a nursing home a woman dies in unknown circumstances, the granddaughter blames the landlady for her grandmother's death even though there is no evidence about her, after questioning the landlady and the elderly, says one of the elderly about the mistreatment of the landlady, and later when the landlady tries to kill one of the old women, she is arrested in time. Cast: Teresa Rabago as Carlota, Regina Flores Ribot as Lupita, Sofía de Llaca as Marisela, Pilar Ixquic Mata as Piedad, Juan José Zerboni as Luis Carlos.
10	10	"Las Cortadoras"	Carlos Carrera	Alfredo Mendoza	25 October 2022	0.61
In a cinema a man was scratched his cheek by an industrial cutter, after questioning the different victims they reveal that it is a teenager who does that to them, some time later they discover a dead man in the same conditions and they discover that it is not only the girl, at the time of capturing her it turns out that she and her mother are the murderers. Cast: Abraham Elizalde as José, Mayra Sérbulo as Romina, Lilia Mendoza as Frida, Adamarís Madrid as Noemi, Vitaly Falomir as Angélica, Alfredo Barraza as Sergio, Roberto Montiel as Attorney, Saúl Canales as Kirios Karras
11	11	"La Vendedora"	Rodrigo Hernández Cruz	Celia Kim	26 October 2022	0.70
After a party, a couple of influencers discover the loss of their baby, this is reported to the UNIC who at first are thought to be the same couple who lost the child, after questioning them twice due to suspicions, at the beginning it was not them, Over time they discover that it is the pediatrician who helped them have the baby, she is arrested and they also recover the baby and return it to its parents. Cast: Danae Reynaud as Baly, Fabrizio Santini as Santi, Verónica Ramos as Elena, Carlo Basabe as Alfonso, Rosario Zúñiga as Teresa Monroy, Renata Sández as Fanny, Arturo Caslo as Alexander
12	12	"El Astrólogo"	Rodrigo Hernández Cruz	Ana Romero	27 October 2022	0.83
Some girls while playing soccer and going back for the ball find a corpse of a young man, they start questioning the boy's girlfriend who tells them about an expert in horoscopes who does not collaborate in anything, then they discover another corpse in the same conditions and he thinks he is the horoscopist and when they try to catch him and he is caught trying to rob some guy. Cast: Juan Cristóbal Castillo as Goyo López, Andy Chávez de Moore as Rosy, Daniel Tovar as Raymundo Zoroastro, Gabriel Ochoa as Julio Santibáñez
13	13	"La Ciudadora"	Carlos Carrera	Heriberto Mujíca	31 October 2022	0.62
Some parents adopt a child and when they take him to the minivan he finds himself lifeless, first it is thought that it is witchcraft made by one of the orphan girls of the orphanage, but over time he begins to think that she is the owner of the orphanage and which over time they find enough evidence and before they kill the girl, they manage to arrest her. Cast: María del Carmen Farías as Socorro, Mauricio Pimentel as Camilo, Mia Briseño as Alexia, Verónika Pesic as Beatriz, Pedro Halil as Marco, Hamid Zayyid as Sebastián, Alexander Thierry as Ulises, Lucía Carrillo as Andrea, Homero Guerra as Carlos, Ámbar Santos as Sara
14	14	"La Tintorera"	Carlos Carrera	David Mascareño	1 November 2022	0.56
A young man accidentally runs over a young woman crossing the street, while the UNIC detectives are busy filling out forms Victoria and Bruno look for the possible murderer who already had two identical victims, after questioning the young man and the owner of a dry cleaner, Victoria she thinks it is the same dyer and after possible evidence she is arrested about to murder a young indigenous woman. Cast: Andrés Estrada as Iker, Karla Cañamar as Ana Pau, Andrés León as Santi, Mayahuel del Monte as Herminia, Ishbel Bautista as Ameyalli, Anna Cepinska as Gisela, Lucero Trejo as Asunción
15	15	"Los Goteros"	Carlos Carrera	Paulina Barros	2 November 2022	0.56
A young cleaning worker returns to his room and finds that his roommate with no vital signs and no intestines, is first thought to be his same roommate even though he is discarded and in reality it is a doctor and a waitress who are arrested, at the moment to interrogate him they self-poison themselves with cyanide. Cast: Pedro Giunti as Gustavo, Mar Carrera as Marcela, Ximena Torres as Pamela, Luz María Meza as Lucrecia, Rodolfo Garrido as Esteban, Andrea Méndez as Valentina, Mikael Lacko as Raúl, Karen Ávila as Gabriela
16	16	"La Niña"	Carlos Carrera	Ricardo Avilés	3 November 2022	0.69
A cleaning woman dies poisoned, among them there are several suspects including the owner of the home who has a daughter who does not speak much, after having presented some "suspect" to confess, it is not really her and when they call the lady owner of the house to close the case and when they try to escape, who in the end the murderer turns out to be nothing more and nothing less than the girl. Cast: Yolanda Paz as Berta, Alicia Sandoval as Aurora, Irina Baños as Rosa, Shary Zureila as Regina, Roberto Uscanga as Santiago, Lesslie Apodaca as Itzel, Mar Carrera as Marcela
17	17	"La Actriz"	Carlos Carrera	Adrián Mazoy	7 November 2022	0.82
After the death of a young woman who was chosen for the main role in a telenovela, it is discovered that the water to lose weight that she drank had chlorine which was the cause of her death, first it is thought that it was someone who organized the acting functions, but in reality she is one of the young women who modified the water, and when she wins the role they "interview" her but when she tries to escape they manage to arrest her. Cast: Victoria White as Dora Dorantes, Arantza de Larrea as Vanessa, Luis Maya as Kristian Amorós, Horacio Beamonte as Ernesto Martínez, Fabiola Cándido as Renata, Mafer Rodríguez as Dulce, Christopher Fragoso as Leonardo, Jacqueline Ivette as Brenda Beltrán
18	18	"El Músico"	Rodrigo Hernández Cruz	David Mascareño	8 November 2022	0.74
An American dies in the Plaza del Mariachi with a dart containing snake venom, the US Ambassador in Mexico gives the case to the UNIC, who try to catch the murderer who is initially thought to be the owner of a store near the plaza Due to his bad talk about Americans and foreigners, when they go to arrest, the murderer turns out to be the member of a mariachi who is arrested in time before murdering an American. Cast: Luis Ernesto Verdín as Jaime, Emmanuel Varela as John Smith, Alberto Acosta as Joel, Julio Maldonado as Pedro, Andrés Dardon as John Miller, Sajid Góngora as Julio
19	19	"El Técnico"	Rodrigo Hernández Cruz	Ana Romero	9 November 2022	0.70
After the death of a woman due to problems caused by the anesthesia put on during her angina surgery, Cap who was in the hospital, decides to help the person affected by the loss of his wife, it is discovered that different relatives of politicians have died in the same way, it is discovered that someone manipulates the hospital machines, and before assassinating Cap, they manage to capture him. Cast: Agustín Ocegueda as Marcial, Melissa Olivares as Alicia, Danny Prezley as Rocío, Waldo Facco as Iván, Mario Diaz-Mercado as Samuel, Noé Alvarado as Ramiro, Valeria Russek as Mónica, Alejandra Maldonado as Susana, Saúl Meléndez as Alfredo
20	20	"El Guapo"	Carlos Carrera	Ana Romero	10 November 2022	0.68
A young woman is found lifeless by her friend with a pig mask and her body bathed in butter, at first she thinks that it is her own friend who murders her, even though it is not like that after having questioned her several times, she revealed that her friend was shy, after long work she thinks of a young man and with the help of a horoscopist they manage to catch the murderer, who was the young man and who murdered for being fat-phobic. Cast: Natasha Arguete as Elena, Catalina López as Carola, Víctor Hugo Arana as Ignacio, Isi Rojano as Simón, Daniel Tovar as Raymundo Zoroastro, Gabriel Ochoa as Julio Santibáñez
21	21	"El Imitador"	Rodrigo Hernández Cruz	Heriberto Mujíca	14 November 2022	0.75
A couple finds the dismembered corpse of a woman, which is specifically that of a prostitute. The UNIC have to investigate the case in detail, after interrogating other prostitutes they reveal that several have died by order, after another prostitute was murdered, they realize that it is the same way Jack the Ripper did it in London, and they manage to capture him before murdering another prostitute. Cast: Sandra Zellweger as Elisa, Dan Márquez as Pedro, Andrea Cabrera as Rita, Emilio Bastré as Rossa, Diana Reséndiz as Lupe, Eduardo Arroyuelo as Juan Domínguez, Nataly Ruíz as Tania, Saúl Canales as Kirios Karras
22	22	"El Maquillista"	Rodrigo Hernández Cruz	Alfredo Mendoza	15 November 2022	0.98
The desire for perfection has very mysterious paths, some, to try to please it, undergo surgery or resort to cosmetic products, others, however, use more drastic methods that could end the lives of thousands of innocent women, The sinister mind behind these crimes will be persecuted by the UNIC, but they must hurry because the human puzzle is advancing by leaps and bounds. Cast: Jorge Carlos Sánchez as Gilberto, Ignacio Riva Palacio as Patrick Alexis, Ingrid Manjarrez as Carmen, Luis Gerardo León as Mauricio, Cynthia Torash as Rocío, Alicia Vélez as Carolina, Rocío García as Graciela León
23	23	"La Picadora"	Carlos Carrera	Ana Romero	16 November 2022	0.78
Revenge can be a dish that is eaten cold, but when this revenge involves acts that threaten the lives of people, the UNIC agents will have to enter to arrest the person who is disobeying the law. Cast: Teresa Rábago as Carlota, Mayahuel del Monte as Herminia, Tonatiuh Salazar as Guillermo, Gabriel Pascual as Ramón, Axel Shuarma as Beto, Jaime Estrada as Eusebio Méndez, Joshua Morales as Paul, Viridiana Bernal as Jennifer, Dora Zaryllán as Columba, Gabriel Cosme as Demetrio, Thanya Acosta as Paula, Xóchitl de la Concha as Rosario
24	24	"El Alpinista"	Carlos Carrera	Alfredo Mendoza	17 November 2022	0.79
The murder of Victoria's parents has tormented her since she witnessed that fateful day, but since she found out that the Capitán was involved in that investigation, nightmares began to increase, so the entire UNIC sets out to reopen the case and discover the connections between those involved, but everyone will be at great risk if they are not careful enough. Cast: Teresa Rábago as Carlota, Saúl Canales as Young Kirios Karras, Mar Carrera as Marcela, Celia Marcué as Mrs. Karras, Juan Alberto Villarreal as Mr. Karras, Víctor Civeira as Senior Kirios Karras "El Alpinista", Verónica Alatriste as Victoria's mother, José Ramón Berganza as Victoria's father, Axhai Vizcaíno as Child Victoria

== Production ==
On 2 February 2022, Sandra Smester announced Lotería del crimen as part of TV Azteca's new programming for 2022. Filming of the season began on 27 June 2022.
