= Lotería del crimen season 3 =

Lotería del crimen
- Season 3
- Starring: Sara Maldonado; Claudio Lafarga; Arnoldo Picazzo; Tamara Niño de Rivera; Francisco Vázquez; Jorge Fink; Alejandra Herrera; Lupita Sandoval
- No. of episodes: 24

Release
- Original network: Azteca 7
- Original release: 10 June – 18 July 2024

Season chronology
- ← Previous; Season 2

The third season of the Mexican television series Lotería del crimen was announced in January 2024. All starring cast members from the previous season returned with the exception of Tatiana del Real and Angélica Lara, who departed the series in the season premiere. The season, consisting of 24 episodes, aired from 10 June 2024 to 18 July 2024, on Azteca 7.

== Cast ==
=== Main ===
- Sara Maldonado as Ariel Aragón
- Arnoldo Picazzo as Eligio Enciso
- Claudio Lafarga as Bruno Barraza
- Tamara Niño de Rivera as Sofía Salabeth
- Francisco Vázquez as Ricardo Romero "El Recio"
- Jorge Fink as Tito Tavares
- Alejandra Herrera as Guadalupe "Gigi" González
- Lupita Sandoval as Marieta "Mari" Martínez

=== Recurring and guest stars ===
- Angélica Lara as Nancy Delfina
- Tatiana del Real as Luisa López
- Andrea Martí as Azul
- Roberto Montiel as Attorney Salabeth
- Ianis Guerrero as Mendoza

== Episodes ==
No. overall	No. in season	Title	Directed by	Written by	Original release date	Mexico viewers (millions)
49	1	"La Reportera 2"	Carlos Carrera	Alfredo Mendoza	10 June 2024	0.95
After multiple discoveries of evidence linking reporter Luisa López to a series of murders, the UNIC begins a manhunt in which the detectives will do everything to catch her. Meanwhile, Bruno feels hurt for having fallen for Luisa's charms, but above all, he feels responsible for having somehow facilitated her job. Cast : Tatiana del Real as Luisa López, Angélica Lara as Nancy Delfina, Octavio Michel as Arquimides, Joaquin Calatayud as Cardozo, Paola Dives as Mafer, Margarita Higuera as Nurse, Iveth Aguilera as Dr. Urrutia
50	2	"El Copiador"	Carlos Carrera	Nora Coss	11 June 2024	0.76
The UNIC investigates a series of cases in which teachers from different schools are hunted and killed in a strategic and personalized way. Everything becomes murkier when they discover that everything is related to a website where students rate their teachers. Cast : Diego Cornejo as Rubén, Homero Ferruzca as Aldo, Paty Tomás as Rosario, Armando Mancilla as Don Cuco, Angie Villa as Bertha, Fernando Beccerra as Eugenio, Julio Paz as Mariano, Cecilia Constantino as Silvia, Mario Alberto Moreno as Attorney Ordoñez, Arcelia Onofre as July, Miriam Rosado as Caridad
51	3	"El Macetero"	Carlos Carrera	Heriberto Mujíca	12 June 2024	0.75
The UNIC tackles the case of a creator of bamboo flower pots, which he makes from the heads of his victims. Clues lead them to discover that the victims are employees of an innovative company. Cast : Emilio Cetina as Dany, Hugo Villalvazo as Emilio, Didier Morales as Samuel, Hector Hugo Peña as Don Jacinto, Fabiola Rivera as Ana, Yalmer Santander as Benavides, Nando Estevane as Mark Gallegos, Alejandro Díaz as Pablo, Nicole Gerar as Lorena, Nadia Marentes as Sacbe, Fernanda Vázquez as Lenia
52	4	"La Mataperros"	Carlos Carrera	Ana Romero	13 June 2024	0.66
The UNIC is investigating a series of cases where victims appear with human bites in different parts of the body, with traces of torture and of having lived in unsanitary conditions. Cast : Ana González Bello as Mandy, Rogelio Cruz as Cuco, Violeta Santiago as Adelina, Diego Estrella as Lupillo, Benjamín Toro as Martín, Salvador Amaya as El Perro, Rocío Muñoz as Sabina, Néstor Galván as Alejo, Rami Ramírez as Juancho, Pedro Lugo as Neto
53	5	"La Familia"	Carlos Carrera	Karen Espinal	17 June 2024	0.75
The detectives have found a series of murdered young women as part of satanic rituals. All the victims appear with signs of torture and are marked with a symbol. The UNIC searches for a connection and meaning among the victims to find the perpetrators. Cast : Antonio Lopeztorres as Rodolfo, Haydee Leyva as Eugenia, Ángel David Rosas as Daniel, Ale Pier as Viridiana, Rodrigo Ordaz as Alonso, Camila Acosta as Lucrecia, Catalina Coteka as Julieta
54	6	"El Cuidador"	Carlos Carrera	David Mascareño	18 June 2024	0.77
A new investigation where a body is found abandoned and with signs of extreme violence leads the detectives to discover that there are several victims who are connected. It appears that all the victims are young people living in vulnerable situations and with absent parents. Cast : León Michell as Vicencio, Eduardo Escalona as Manolo, Ángel Sierra as Jaime, Ashel Mansur as Nacho, Camila Salinas as Arely, Fidel Garriga as Amadeo, Luis Miguel Troncoso as Demetrio, Oscar Fozzi as Joaquín, Lidia Mares as Clara
55	7	"La Optimista"	Carlos Carrera	Ana Romero	19 June 2024	0.94
A woman whose obsession is to be happy, wants to detoxify her surroundings by putting an end to the suffering of people who have a mental disorder or are going through a bad time in their lives. Cast : Florencia Ríos as Diana, Daniel Aranzubia as Guillermo, Alicia Camps as Martha, Juan José Pucheta as Raúl, Raúl Sosa as Mauro, Alejandra Ranero as Eugenia, Yeimy Gallardo as Lulú, Esteban Maggio as Moisés
56	8	"El Cartero"	Carlos Carrera	Alfredo Mendoza	20 June 2024	0.77
The UNIC is presented with a case of multiple poisonings by mail in a private residence, where the neighbors are the main witnesses and suspects in the investigation. The team must dig into the lives of each neighbor to find the mailman guilty of the deaths. Cast : Idalia Figueroa as Julieta, Juan Carlos Alcocer as Paco, Francisco Barcala as Roberto, María Thistle as Olivia, Ana Lucía Santibáñez
57	9	"La Bordadora"	Carlos Carrera	David Mascareño	24 June 2024	0.66
Tired of being mistreated by her clients, an embroiderer decides to take revenge by brutally murdering those who messed with her. Cast : Tete Espinoza as Emma, Miguel Ángel Aguilar as Eddy, Juan Carlos Sáenz as Chuy, Mariano Aguirre as Ferran, Juan Carlos Ramírez as Luis Gabriel, Norma Márquez as Meche, Elizabeth Cortez as Kathya, Juan Carlos Torres as Esteban, Alejandra Hera as Rosalba, Estefania Cortina as Susana
58	10	"La Afiladora"	Carlos Carrera	Nora Coss	25 June 2024	0.86
The UNIC detectives deal with a case in which the victims are found cut in half and the words "For Rent" written in blood all over the crime scene. Cast : Carmen Ramos as Tere, John Goodrich as Richard, Damián Vega as Efigenio, Diana Salgado as Ana Lucía, Paulo Di Florio as Lucas, Elena Garza as Ana, Javier Adrián as Carlos, Rubén Arciniega as Jacinto, Gilda Villareal as Elena, Aliona Poyarkova as Catherine, Mateo Calentano as Carlo, Manuel Fajardo as Andreas, Nicolas Lemaire as Bastián
59	11	"La Vampiro"	Carlos Carrera	Heriberto Mujíca	26 June 2024	0.97
The UNIC faces a mother who is willing to drain the blood of as many young people as necessary to save her son's life. Cast : Andrea Martí as Azul, Sofía Marcela Ríos as Rosalía, Tony Cabral as Placido, Lizette Araiza as Margo, Fernando Solís as Eduardo, Marco Orozco as Gerardo, Armando Said as Rafita, Georgette Terrazas as Sara, Diego Sandoval as Samuel, Fer Manzano as Valenciano, Oskaar Alonso as Taracena, Memo Donath as Dante
60	12	"El Jugador"	Carlos Carrera	David Mascareño	27 June 2024	0.76
The UNIC detectives face an assassin who has made it clear that he has information about them and with confusing clues will lure them into his game where the objective is to prevent more deaths. Cast : Ricardo Esquerra as Erubiel, Celeste Villalobos as Sandra, Thalía Sala as Dulce, Elliott Joshua as Raúl, Carilu Navarro as Martina, Raúl Galindo as Marcial, Esteban Montes as Julio, Marcela Virchez as Cecilia, Ramiro Piñón as Martín, Arturo Sosa as El Ruso, Chris Gaudi as Mariano
61	13	"El Jugador 2"	Carlos Carrera	David Mascareño	1 July 2024	0.71
The UNIC is inside the chaotic game of a serial killer and must plan their next move carefully in order to save the victims. Cast : Ricardo Esquerra as Erubiel, Jair de Rubin as Sebastián, Arturo Sosa as El Ruso, Edna Alcocer as Mariela, León Barragan as Melgar
62	14	"El Limpiador"	Carlos Carrera	Alfredo Mendoza	2 July 2024	0.77
The UNIC faces an environmentalist serial killer who seeks to dissolve the insides of entrepreneurs and inventors with cleaning products, making their death slow and very painful. Cast : Leonardo Alonso as Rómulo Amaro, Angelo Saláis as Arturo, Michael Waisman as Óscar Camarena, Arturo Echevarría as Licenciado Carrasco, Ariana Sacristán as Carolina del Olivar, Zhayra Rosales as Denise Vergara
63	15	"El Académico"	Carlos Carrera	Ana Romero	3 July 2024	0.80
The UNIC is working on a case where a murderer who is a fan of classical music uses strings from different instruments to end the lives of his victims. The detectives get to work when Bruno is captured by the criminal. Cast : Eduardo Reza as Gilberto, Carlos Medina as Jorge, Paty Tomas as Rosario, Armando Mancilla as Don Cuco, Eduardo Rivera as Octavio, Carlos Medina as Jorge, Dulce Santana as Inés, Maricarmen de la Peña as Renata, Darko Noguez as Martín, Miriam Guse as Julita, Javier Tascón as Moncho, Pahola Escalera as Flora, Andrea Arroyo as Toña
64	16	"Los Curanderos"	Carlos Carrera	Nora Coss	4 July 2024	0.93
The UNIC detectives are after Los curanderos, who murder their victims by making them believe they are undergoing a healing ritual. Cast : Gilberto Barraza as Adalberto, Aleyda Gallardo as Gloria, Laura Azpeitia as Cleo, Fausto de Valdez as Licenciado Rosales, Tamara Salamonovitz as Adela, Alberto Hernández as Dr. Iglesias, Víctor Franco as Armando, Amalia Rangel as Esther, Bárbara González as Carmen, Rafael Gallegos as Adrián, Sheyla Ferrera as Luisa, Jony Bm as Hugo
65	17	"La Barbera"	Carlos Carrera	Karen Espinal	8 July 2024	0.79
La Barbera is a serial killer that lures her victims with her feminine charms and then slits their throats and takes pictures of them. The UNIC detectives are assisted by Diego, Bruno's brother, in capturing her. Cast : Frida Astrid as Catalina, Jorge Luis Vázquez as Diego, Abraham Lombrozo as Gabriel, Chino Sánchez as Paco, Axel Láscari as Josué, Paulina de Lira as Adriana, Ana Ortiz Haro as Isabel, Esteban de la Isla as Andrés, Carla Müller as Mónica
66	18	"El Coleccionista"	Carlos Carrera	Heriberto Mujíca	9 July 2024	0.72
The Collector keeps the eyes of his victims as a trophy after murdering them and he decides takes agent Sofía as a prisoner, challenging El Recio to a combat where he disputes the well-being of his partner. Cast : Archie Balardi as Anibal, Gabriel Pingarrón as Don Nacho, Samuel Zarazúa as Esteban, Gagoneytor as Jacobo, María Paula Gay as Sally, Enrique Logan as Brandon, Acoyani Chacón as Ismael, Andrea Ornelas as Anabel, Andrés Llera as Olmo
67	19	"El Ángel"	Carlos Carrera	Nora Coss	10 July 2024	0.74
Detective Toño, a friend of agent Guadalupe, requests her help at a crime scene, where UNIC agents enter the investigation when they find a pattern of behavior among the murders. El Ángel is a young man who seeks to protect his mother by destroying the genitals of his victims. Cast : Mayra Sierra as Rocío, Daron González as Santi, Jorge Richards as Miguel, Toño Valdés as Toño, Alejandro Rivacoba as Joaquín, Diana Ávalos as Carmina, María José Velázquez as Daniela, Darío Campos as Juanjo, Adriana Millán as Mónica
68	20	"El Delegado"	Carlos Carrera	David Mascareño	11 July 2024	0.82
The UNIC detectives encounter a young man obsessed with aliens, who murders by extracting organs from his victims because he thinks he is The Delegate from space and has a very important mission. Cast : Diego Llamazares as Leo, David Chavira as Mike, Italia Farrokh as Larisa, Andrei Caballero as Daniel, Lorenzo Lavin as Fede, Adriana Becerril as Alicia, Adrián Román as Jorge, María Goretti as Graciela, Ángel Zozaya as Adolfo, Francisco Gutiérrez as Damián
69	21	"La Electricista"	Carlos Carrera	Ana Romero	15 July 2024	0.70
A series of murders are considered work-related accidents, so agents Aragón and Guadalupe infiltrate a fashion agency to find the murderer. Cast : Valeria Russek as Helena, Cami Romeo as Mafer, Elías Ajit as Aguilar, Ricardo Maza as Víctor, Camila Puerto as Anita, Siani Segovia as Rodrigo, Iván Flores as Jaime, Fritza Torres as Eduviges, Diana Avellaneda as Juanita
70	22	"El Fanático"	Carlos Carrera	Karen Espinal	15 July 2024	0.70
The UNIC detectives arrive at a case that takes place inside a city soccer field, where the victims have mutilated limbs. The murderer is ending the lives of his victims in the name of his favorite team. Cast : Alberto Casanova as Tadeo, Fernando Martín del Campo as George, Tania Noriega as Marta, Daniel Oropeza as Manuel, Ligia Pérez as Norma, Rodrigo Román Báez as Garfias, Carolina Torres as Rosalba, Eber Segobia as Adrián Villaseñor
71	23	"El Juguetero"	Carlos Carrera	Heriberto Mujíca	18 July 2024	0.80
It's Christmas and the UNIC detectives are called to a gruesome crime scene, where the victims are found flayed under the Christmas tree. Cast : Javier Díaz Dueños as Nico, Simone Victoria as Santa, Roberto Montiel as Attorney Salabeth, Ricardo Etiéne as Paquito, Tatiana Andrews as Yuria, Matilde Miranda as Amalia, Yhoana Marell as Yesenia, Jesús García Ra as Heraclio, Evangelina Martínez as Elodia, Alexis Valencia as Matías, Ximena Alexis as María, Roberto Ríos as Lucio, Alejandra Farah as Aitana
72	24	"El Machetero"	Carlos Carrera	Alfredo Mendoza	18 July 2024	0.69
A new member joins the UNIC and helps solve the case of a murderer who dismembers his victims and apparently has unfinished business with the detectives. Cast : Ianis Guerrero as Mendoza, Roberto Montiel as Attorney Salabeth, David Jafet as El Púas, Laura de Ita as Simona, Víctor Duróc as Don Carolino, Julián Jiménez as El Turbo, Leo Tejeda as El Bujes, Guadalupe Damián as La Tolva, Adrián Flores as Felipe

== Production ==
On 22 January 2024, TV Azteca renewed Lotería del crimen for a third season. Filming of the season concluded on 4 May 2024.
