= Daniel Hidalgo Valdés =

Mexican composer, sound designer and educator

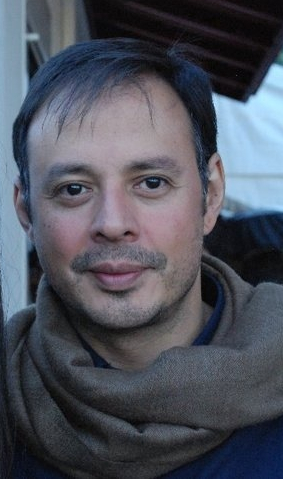
- Daniel Hidalgo Valdés

President of the Academy of Mexican Motion Picture Arts and Sciences
- Incumbent
- Assumed office 4 November 2025
- Preceded by: Armando Casas

Personal details
- Born: December 11, 1971 (age 54) Mexico City, Mexico
- Occupation: Composer, record producer, sound designer, educator
- Known for: Amores perros, El Alcalde, After Darkness

Daniel Hidalgo Valdés (born 11 December 1971) is a Mexican composer, record producer, sound designer and education researcher. He became president of the Academy of Mexican Motion Picture Arts and Sciences (AMACC) on 4 November 2025.

== Early life and education ==
Hidalgo Valdés was born in Mexico City. He is the son of scientist María de los Ángeles Valdés and the brother of Mexican cinematographer Carlos Hidalgo.

He studied composition at the Centro de Investigación y Estudios Musicales (CIEM). He later obtained a master's degree in Research and Development of Education from the Universidad Iberoamericana in Mexico City and a master's degree in Documentary Film from the Universidad de la Comunicación. As of 2025 he is studying a master's degree in Applied Artificial Intelligence at the Monterrey Institute of Technology and Higher Education.

== Career ==
Hidalgo Valdés has composed music for film, theatre and television. His best-known film scores include Amores perros (2000), directed by Alejandro González Iñárritu, and the documentary El Alcalde (2012), directed by Diego Osorno, Emiliano Altuna and Carlos Rossini; both films were nominated for the Ariel Award for Best Original Score by the AMACC. He also wrote the music for the plays eXtras, directed by Sabina Berman, and La noche en que raptaron a Epifania, directed by Ana Francis Mor, which received the Silvestre Revueltas Award for Best Original Music from Mexican theatre critics.

In addition to composition, he has worked extensively in sound post-production and sound design for feature films, documentaries, theatre and advertising. In 2000 he received the Ariel Award for Best Sound for the documentary feature Del olvido al no me acuerdo, directed by Juan Carlos Rulfo. In 2020 he won the award for Best Sound Design at the Critics and Theatre Journalists Association Awards (ACPT) for the play Tártaro, directed by David Psalmon.

=== Sound art and installations ===
Hidalgo Valdés has also developed sound-art projects, including radio plays, feature-style radio pieces and sound installations. Among them are the radio play Del otro lado de la pared, written by Flavio González Mello; the sound installation 7 akústicas y un cuarto, presented at the Segunda Bienal Latinoamericana de Radio; and the multimedia exhibition H2O DF, produced during his tenure as a fellow of Mexico's National System of Art Creators.

=== Teaching ===
Since the age of 21, Hidalgo Valdés has taught at several higher-education institutions, including the Universidad del Claustro de Sor Juana, the Universidad Iberoamericana, the Centro de Capacitación Cinematográfica (CCC) and the Monterrey Institute of Technology and Higher Education (ITESM). He is a member of Mexico's National System of Art Creators.

== Presidency of the AMACC ==
In September 2025 Hidalgo Valdés was elected president of the Academy of Mexican Motion Picture Arts and Sciences for the 2025–2027 term, succeeding Armando Casas. His appointment was reported in Mexican and international media.

== Awards and honours ==
- 2000 – Ariel Award for Best Sound for Del olvido al no me acuerdo.
- 2001 – Ariel Award nomination for Best Original Score for Amores perros.
- 2002 – Silvestre Revueltas Award for Best Original Music for the play La noche en que raptaron a Epifania.
- 2010 – Best Music for an Animated Short Film at the Pantalla de Cristal Festival for Luna.
- 2011–2015 – Fellow, National System of Art Creators (Sistema Nacional de Creadores de Arte).
- 2011 – Elected active member of the AMACC.
- 2014 – Ariel Award nomination for Best Original Score for El Alcalde.
- 2014 – Best Original Music Award at the 21st Festival Latinoamericano de Video y Artes Visuales de Rosario, Argentina, for Las tardes de Tintíco.
- 2016 – Best Original Score at the Pantalla de Cristal Festival for Los parecidos.
- 2018–2020 – Fellow, National System of Art Creators.
- 2021 – Secretary of the AMACC.
- 2022 – Best Sound Design Award at the Critics and Theatre Journalists Association Awards (ACPT).

== Selected filmography ==
As composer or co-composer unless otherwise noted.

- Parabola (1995), short film
- Cuentos para solitarios (1999), television series
- Amores perros (2000)
- Sierra bruta (2002)
- Un viaje (2004), short film
- En el sofá (2005), short film
- 9 y 20 (2005), short film
- Me gusta cuando callas (2005), short film
- Cochinadas (2006), short film
- Con devoción (2006), documentary
- El viaje de la nonna (2007)
- 2033 (2009)
- Discutamos México (2010), television series
- Luna (2010), animated short film
- Naica, viaje a la cueva de los cristales (2010), documentary
- Al acecho del leopardo (2011), short film
- Los Minondo (2010), television series
- Perras (2012)
- Las tardes de Tintico (2012), short film
- El Alcalde (2012), documentary
- La Revolución de los Alcatraces (2013), documentary
- El dictado (2014), short film
- El maestro y la flor (2014), short film
- Mi vanidad (2014), short film
- Olas del cielo (2015), short film
- Los ases del corral (2015), short film
- Grandes figuras del arte mexicano (2015), television series
- Los parecidos (2015)
- Potentiae (2017), documentary
- Ayúdame a pasar la noche (2017)
- Al otro lado del muro (2017), documentary
- After Darkness (2019)
- De Santo Domingo al Zócalo (2019)
- Ciudad (2020)
- Cuidado con lo que deseas (2020)
- Lejos del sur (2021), television series
- El Apóstol (2023), television series
- Intervalo (2025), short film
- Memoria de los olvidados (2025)
- Baby App (2026)
