= Corazones al límite =

Mexican television series

- Also known as: Corazones al límite, Reto de Juventud
- Genre: Telenovela
- Created by: Enrique Jiménez; Guillermo Quezada; María Auxilio Salado
- Written by: Enrique Jiménez; Guillermo Quezada; María Auxilio Salado
- Directed by: Sergio Cataño; Claudio Reyes Rubio
- Starring: Erika Buenfil; Arturo Peniche; Sherlyn; Sara Maldonado; Aarón Díaz
- Opening theme: "Vivir" by Belinda
- Ending theme: "Vivir" by Belinda
- Country of origin: Mexico
- Original language: Spanish
- No. of episodes: 145

Production
- Executive producer: Roberto Hernández Vázquez
- Producer: Nicandro Díaz González
- Production locations: Filming; Televisa San Ángel; Mexico City, Mexico
- Cinematography: Vivian Sánchez Ross; Armando Zafra
- Editors: Juan Franco; Luis Horacio Valdés
- Camera setup: Multi-camera
- Running time: 41–44 minutes
- Production company: Televisa

Original release
- Network: Canal de las Estrellas
- Release: March 15 – October 1, 2004

Corazones al límite (English: Hearts to the Limit, alternatively named Hearts on the Edge in some English-speaking territories) is a Mexican telenovela produced by Roberto Hernández Vázquez for Televisa and broadcast in Mexico by Canal de las Estrellas, replacing Clap, el lugar de tus sueños from March 15 to October 1, 2004.

Erika Buenfil, Arturo Peniche, Sara Maldonado, and Aarón Díaz starred as protagonists, while Sherlyn, Arleth Terán, Jorge de Silva, and Susy-Lu Peña starred as antagonists.

== Plot ==
Diana (Sara Maldonado) teenage girl, who was emotionally neglected from her parents, and felt unwanted. After being expelled from her boarding school in Switzerland, Diana goes back to live with her parents. Diana's aunt, Pilar, comes over and witnesses a great deal fighting and tension within the household.

She offers solace to Diana by letting her live with her. Diana goes to the mall where she bumps into Braulio (Aarón Díaz). She keeps bumping into him in various places, especially school. Braulio was orphaned when he was about twelve years old.

He lives with his wicked aunt; his kind, but oblivious uncle; and his cruel cousin, Esteban (Jorge de Silva). Braulio has a friend named Conny (Sherlyn) who tries to date him, but he isn't interested. Conny absolutely hates Diana as he is attracted to her. Braulio later finds out that Diana comes from a rich background, something Diana never told him, which leads to them splitting up. Diana later ends up dating Esteban, not knowing that he is Braulio's wicked cousin.

The plot, in essence, tells the story of several teens in a school. The story lines are designed to affect pre-teen minds: The orphan Braulio, Diana at her boarding school, and Connie and her parents winning the lottery, to name just a few.

In addition to all this, when Aunt Pilar (Erika Buenfil) first registers Diana into school, she meets her long lost love, Álvaro, who works at the school. Álvaro also works with Emma, who has feelings for him, but now that Pilar is back in the picture, Álvaro only has eyes for Pilar.

Things change when Alvaro mistakenly thinks Pilar is married, and sleeps with Emma. After finding out his mistake, Álvaro goes back to Pilar, but keeps his affair with Emma a secret, even when Pilar asks if there was anything going on.

The jealous Emma finds out that Álvaro is dating Pilar after seeing the two at a restaurant. She later discovers she is pregnant and lies to Álvaro, telling him that she is positive that he is the father. (She doesn't mention that she had also slept with Esteban.)

== Cast ==
- Erika Buenfil as Pilar de la Reguera
- Arturo Peniche as Álvaro Riverol
- Sara Maldonado as Diana Antillón de la Reguera
- Aarón Díaz as Braulio Valladares Stone
- Sherlyn as Concepción "Conny" Pérez Ávila
- Jorge de Silva as Esteban Molina Valladares
- Arleth Terán as Emma Martinez
- Marco Muñoz as Domenico Antillón
- Susy-Lu Peña as Nancy
- Uberto Bondoni as Rolando
- René Casados as Dante Lacalfari
- Maritza Olivares as Amalia Valladares
- Mariagna Prats as Irene de la Reguera
- Manuela Ímaz as Isadora Moret Rivadeneira
- Alex Sirvent as Eduardo Arellano Gómez
- Mariana Sánchez Williams as Artemisa Madrigal Tovar
- Miguel Ángel Biaggio as Samuel Cisneros Castro
- Belinda as Elena "Elenita" Arellano Gómez
- Christina Pastor as Olga
- Daniel Berlanga as Damián
- Daniel Habif as Alberto
- Nancy Taira as Coral
- Paola Riquelme as Enriqueta
- Ricardo Margaleff as Antonio
- Rodrigo Tejeda as Joaquín
- Ximena Herrera as Malkah
- Ramon Valdés as Jesús "Chucho" Pérez Ávila
- Haydeé Navarra as Bianca de la Torre
- Luis Fonsi as Roy
- Aarón Hernán as Arthur
- Raymundo Capetillo as Daniel Molina
- Manuel Saval as Osvaldo Madrigal
- Nicky Mondellini as Lourdes "Lulú" Gómez
- María Marcela as Sofía
- Lucero Lander as Julieta
- Beatriz Moreno as Francisca "Paquita" Ávila
- Pedro Romo as Alfonso "Poncho" Pérez
- Oscar Traven as Sebastián
- Archie Lafranco as Paul
- Marcela Páez as Gabriela Tovar
- Queta Lavat as Gudelia
- Francisco Avendaño as Ulises Gómez
- Javier Herranz as Padre Anselmo
- Isadora González as Bárbara Magallanes
- Maricarmen Vela as Mercedes
- Rafael del Villar as Professor Muñoz
- Rubén Morales as Adrián Romo
- Fernando Carrera as Dr. Ernesto Torres
- Gina Pedret as Dulce María
- Karla Barahona as Lilia
- Beatriz Aguirre as Victoria Vda. de Antillón
- Nestor Emmanuel as Javier
- Blanca Sánchez as Martha
- Jacqueline Voltaire as Sra. Kullman
- Angelique Boyer as Anette
