= Javier Díaz Dueñas =

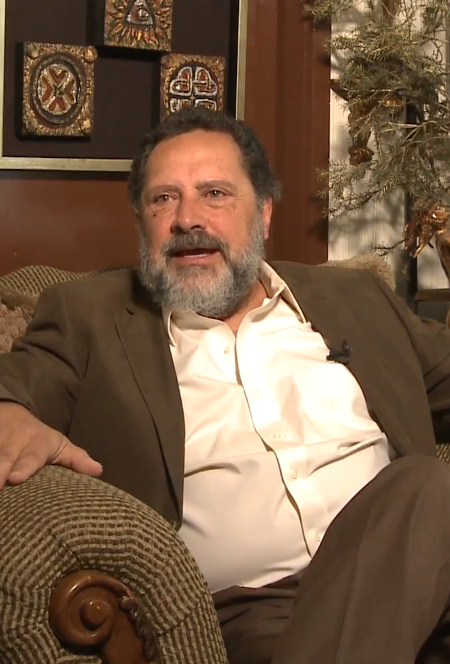
- Dueñas in an interview in May 2017
- Born: Mexico City, Mexico
- Years active: 1984-present

Javier Díaz Dueñas is a Mexican actor and director.

== Filmography ==
=== Film ===
| Year | Title | Role | Notes |
|---|---|---|---|
| 2002 | Nadie escucha | Unknown role | Short film |
| 2003 | La hija del caníbal | Inspector García | |
| 2003 | Lazos de familia | Uncle | Short film |
| 2007 | El búfalo de la noche | Papá de Gregorio | |
| 2011 | Crimenes de lujuria | Horacio | |
| 2013 | Vicio maldito | Himself | |

=== Television ===
| Year | Title | Role | Notes |
|---|---|---|---|
| 1984 | Los años felices | Contador | |
| 1985 | Juana Iris | Licenciado Castañeira | |
| 1989 | El cristal empañado | Leopoldo | |
| 1989 | Balada por un amor | Unknown role | |
| 1990 | Mi pequeña Soledad | Unknown role | |
| 1996 | Morir dos veces | Mauricio | |
| 1996 | La antorcha encendida | Pedro Moreno | |
| 1997 | La chacala | Unknown role | |
| 1997 | Rivales por accidente | Daniel Oliva | |
| 2004 | Zapata: amor en rebeldía | Miguel | |
| 2007 | Mientras haya vida | Don Ramón | |
| 2008 | Capadocia | Juan | 4 episodes |
| 2009 | Pobre Diabla | Padre Vicente "Chente" Rocha | Season 1, episode 141 |
| 2009–12 | XY. La revista | Luis Quitaño | 29 episodes |
| 2010 | La Loba | Montemayor | |
| 2010 | Prófugas del destino | Senador Rafael | |
| 2010 | Drenaje profundo | Orlando Webber "El Cristos" | Episode: "Un sepelio para Cristos" |
| 2011 | Bajo el alma | Ignacio | |
| 2012 | La ruta blanca | Licenciado Adolfo Mastreta | |
| 2012 | La Teniente | Vicealmirante Facundo Ballesteros | Episode: "De una o de otra manera" |
| 2013 | La Patrona | Tomás "Tigre" Suárez | 35 episodes |
| 2013 | Sr. Ávila | Patrón | 2 episodes |
| 2013 | Hombre tenías que ser | Emiliano Lomelí "El Tiburón" | |
| 2013–15 | El Señor de los Cielos | Don Anacleto "Cleto" Letrán | 50 episodes |
| 2014–15 | Los miserables | Radamés Echeverría | 106 episodes |
| 2016 | Eva la trailera | Martín Contreras | 110 episodes |
| 2016 | Entre correr y vivir | Don Pedro | |
| 2016 | El Chema | Don Anacleto "Cleto" Letrán | Season 1, episode 13 |
| 2016–17 | Perseguidos | General Segovia | 5 episodes |
| 2017 | Su nombre era Dolores, la Jenn que yo conocí | Pete Salgado | |
| 2017–18 | Las Malcriadas | Julián | |
| 2021 | La suerte de Loli | TBA | Main cast |
| 2022 | High Heat | Eliás Solórzano | Recurring role (season 1) |
| 2024 | El Conde: Amor y honor | Leopoldo Villarreal | |
