= El que busca encuentra =

- Directed by: Pedro Pablo Ibarra
- Written by: Miguel Burra
- Starring: Ana Brenda Contreras; Claudio Lafarga
- Cinematography: Fido Pérez-Gavilán
- Edited by: Leonel Pérez
- Music by: Rodrigo Dávila
- Release date: 24 February 2017 (Mexico)
- Running time: 93 minutes
- Country: Mexico
- Language: Spanish

El que busca encuentra is 2017 Mexican romantic comedy film directed by Pedro Pablo Ibarra. The film premiered on 24 February 2017, and is stars Ana Brenda Contreras, and Claudio Lafarga, along to Esmeralda Pimentel, Martín Altomaro, Marianna Burelli, Erik Hayser, and Mía Rubín Legarreta. The film was filmed in Mexico City and in San Cristóbal de las Casas, Chiapas.

== Plot ==
Marcos (Claudio Lafarga) and Esperanza (Ana Brenda Contreras) are two children who fall in love when they get lost in the Azteca Stadium during a football match. More than 20 years later, the memory of that childhood love is so strong that both will look for ways to get back together.

== Cast ==
- Ana Brenda Contreras as Esperanza Medina
  - Mía Rubín Legarreta as Esperanza (90's)
- Claudio Lafarga as Marcos Aguado
  - * Ramiro Cid as Marcos (90's)
- Esmeralda Pimentel as Angélica
- Otto Sirgo as Jesús Medina
  - Andrés Montiel as Jesús Medina (90's)
- Damayanti Quintanar as Erika
- Marianna Burelli as Mónica
- Martín Altomaro as Claudio
- Erik Hayser as Jorge Ashby
- Alberto Guerra as Manuel Aguado (90's)
- Natasha Dupeyrón as Bibiana Zamarripa
- Fernando Ciangherotti as Sr. Zamarripa
- Ianis Guerrero as Yosu
- Andrés Palacios as Dr. Fuentes
- Luis Arrieta as Fede
- Jorge Zárate as Vendedor Estadio
