= Miguel Couturier =

Mexican actor

- Born: 29 September 1950; Mexico City, Mexico
- Died: 3 January 2012 (aged 61); Mexico City, Mexico
- Occupation: Actor
- Years active: 1983–2012

Miguel Couturier (29 September 1950 – 3 January 2012) was a Mexican actor. He appeared in more than 50 films and television shows between 1983 and 2012.

He died on 12 January 2012 from a pancreatic cancer. His son Andrés Couturier is also a cineast.

== Selected filmography ==
- Once Upon a Time in Mexico (2003)
- Zapata: El sueño de un héroe (2004)
- 2033 (2009)
- Miss Bala (2011)
