= My Mother-in-law Hates Me =

- Theatrical release poster
- Directed by: Andres Feddersen
- Written by: Andres Feddersen; Loretto Bernal
- Produced by: Andres Feddersen; Loretto Bernal; Carlos Castillo P.
- Starring: Loretto Bernal; Itatí Cantoral; Jerry Velázquez; Willy Semler; Alexis de Anda
- Cinematography: David Bravo; Jorge González
- Edited by: Cristóbal Díaz Hernandez
- Music by: Juan Pablo del Brutto
- Production company: LAF Producciones
- Distributed by: Cinépolis Distribución
- Release date: December 22, 2022
- Running time: 90 minutes
- Countries: Mexico; Chile
- Language: Spanish
- Box office: $605,674

My Mother-in-law Hates Me (Spanish: Mi suegra me odia) is a 2022 comedy film directed by Andres Feddersen who co-wrote the screenplay with Loretto Bernal. Starring Loretto Bernal, Itatí Cantoral, Jerry Velázquez, Willy Semler and Alexis de Anda. It premiered on December 22, 2022, in Mexican theaters.

== Synopsis ==
Clara throughout her life has been rejected for being extremely tidy and clean, which is why she will seek to please her boyfriend's mother-in-law, Regina, so as not to lose the only man who loves her just the way she is. However, he did not think that reaching that goal will be more difficult than it seems.

== Cast ==
The actors participating in this film are:

- Loretto Bernal as Clara
- Itatí Cantoral as Regina
- Jerry Velázquez as Pato
- Willy Semler as Alonso
- Alexis de Anda as Pili
