= Cuando toca la campana =

- Genre: Comedy
- Starring: Mariana Magaña; Leonel Deluglio; Nicole Luis; Diana Santos; Jorge Blanco; Julio Graham; Gerardo Velazquez; Stephie Camarena; Eva De Dominici
- Opening theme: "Cuando toca la campana" by Cuando toca la campana cast
- Country of origin: Argentina
- Original language: Spanish
- No. of seasons: 2
- No. of episodes: 70

Production
- Executive producer: Thor Mereidos
- Producer: Camila Pitre
- Production locations: Buenos Aires, Argentina
- Running time: 14 minutes

Original release
- Network: Disney Channel
- Release: 20 February 2011 – 12 January 2013

Cuando toca la campana (When the Bell Rings) is an Argentine sitcom airing on Disney Channel Latin America. The series premiered on February 28, 2011. Created by Cristal Líquido Produções and starring Mariana Magaña, Leonel Deluglio, Nicole Luis, Diana Santos, Jorge Blanco, Julio Graham, Gerardo Velazquez, Stephie Camarena and Eva De Dominici, the show follows the adventures of guys who try to have fun, "When the bell rings" (Cuando toca la campana) for the break. It is a Latin American adaptation based on the Disney Channel Italy series Quelli dell'intervallo.

== Premise ==
Cuando toca la campana revolves around the adventures of the friends and enemies Barbi (Mariana Magaña), Miguel (Leonel Deluglio), Lucia (Nicole Luis), Ana (Diana Santos), Pablo (Jorge Blanco), Rodrigo (Julio Graham), DJ (Gerardo Velazquez), Naty (Stephie Camarena) and Paola (Eva De Dominici), who study in the same school and try to enjoy recess, all trying to adapt themselves and their crazy adventures. Lucia waiting for the Miguel love and him waiting for her love, Barbi doing crazy things with DJ; Ana, always trying to get good grades and spending some time with Pablo, Rodrigo always fill them all with his bad luck, Natalia acting and having fun and Paola always singing.

== Background ==
The show was produced by Disney Channel Latin America in association with Cristal Liquido Produçöes.

== Cast ==
- Barbi (portrayed by Mariana Magaña) is a sensible and sensitive girl. She is distracted and shy but very funny, and likes to tell illogical stories and absurd theorizing. She likes to dance a lot, a close friend of DJ, and always publish the gossip he says.
- Miguel (portrayed by Leonel Deluglio) is a great friend. Miguel is funny, charming and full of good vibes. He puts friendship before everything and likes to solve the problems of their friends. He is in love with Lucia.
- Lucia (portrayed by Nicole Luis) is the pretty and popular girl in school. Is charismatic and very practical, she likes to organize things. She is considered a leader but always worried about her appearance.
- Ana (portrayed by Diana Santos) is the smart girl at school. She is a girl who is interested in ecology and she thinks save the world.

The cast of Cuando toca la campana (from left to right). Julio Graham as Rodrigo, Leonel Deluglio as Miguel, Diana Santos as Ana, Gerardo Velazquez as DJ, Eva De Dominici as Paola, Nicole Luis as Lucía, Stephi Camarena as Natalia, Jorge Blanco as Pablo and Mariana Magaña as Barbi.

- Pablo (portrayed by Jorge Blanco) is the most sporting guy. He is considered the best soccer player.
- Rodrigo (portrayed by Julio Graham) is a distracted and confused boy who is superstitious and very pessimistic.
- "DJ" (portrayed by Gerardo Velazquez) is the school gossip. He tells everything to everybody, he loves music and dancing.
- Natalia (portrayed by Stephi Camarena) is a girl who likes the arts, like singing, dancing, acting and painting.
- Paola (portrayed by Eva De Dominici) is a singer, but very vain and only goes to school to show off that is educated and will look like any other girl.

=== Recurring cast ===
- A girl – Carla Medina

== Episodes ==
Season	Episodes	Originally aired (Latin America)	
Season	Episodes	Season premiere	Season finale
1	38	February 20, 2011	December 31, 2011
2	32	March 31, 2012	January 12, 2013

=== Season 1 (2011) ===
No.	Title	Original release date	Prod. code
1	"Drama"	20 February 2011	101
Everything begins when Nati has a new camera and she searches for interesting things to film. Lucia and Barbi try to convince her to film them but they don't end up convincing her because Nati believes that they are not interesting enough. Ana arrives sadly short after, and Nati films her as she tells her sorrow that she got a 9 in her Physics test, the girls try to cheer her up but she continues with her sadness. Meanwhile, the boys talk about Pablo, because he got 2 red cards in a football match, and he is sad like Ana. Afterward, the two meet and comfort each other. Absent: Eva Carolina De Dominici as Paola
2	"Entrenamiento (Practice)"	28 February 2011	102
Lucia finds out that there is a talent show in their school. She wants to invite Miguel to participate with her but she does not know how to tell him; what she does not know is that Miguel wants to invite her as well but faces the same problem as her, he asks help from Pablo but it turns out really bad because Pablo only exercises, which does not end up helping him. Soon after, Lucia finds Miguel singing a song that asks her out to the contest. She sat by his side and they ended up explaining everything to each other. Absent: Eva Carolina De Dominici as Paola
3	"La Diva (The Diva)"	1 March 2011	103
Paola, the famous singer, comes back to school to take up her missed exams. All the boys chase her and they ask her autographs, causing chaos, including Nati and Barbi who are fascinated by her. However, Lucia and Ana are not contented by her visit, so they decided to find people who are like-minded. Not even Miguel, who is in love with Lucia, could resist Paola's charms. When everyone follows Paola she begs the girls to hide her including Lucia and Ana. Paola tells them that she wants to be a normal girl like them and she just came to study. Lucia and Ana are touched by her words and they wanted her to be with them when suddenly Paola tells them that it was only for a day and she left leaving them like stupid.
4	"Poesía (Poetry)"	2 March 2011	104
Today there is an examination in poetry. Ana is prepared for it when she sees DJ listening to music, she tells him to study but he does not care and when he leaves, a paper flies. He gets the paper where there is a romantic poem where Ana speaks of Pablo, DJ's initial thought is that Ana is in love with Pablo and he tells it to Nati and Barbi; the three begin to spy Pablo when Lucia and Miguel discover them. They tell them everything. Soon after Rodrigo, Ana and Pablo appear. They call Rodrigo to leave them with the guys. While the boys told him that they spied him together and that they decided to leave and tell them about their suspicion, Ana, while defending herself told them that it was all a lie and the poem was not for Pablo, she told it to herself that they nearly discovered it, which shows that indeed she is in love with Pablo. Absent: Eva Carolina De Dominici as Paola
