= Perseguidos =

2016–17 Mexican telenovela

- Also known as: El Capo
- Genre: Telenovela
- Created by: Natalia Núñez
- Story by: Gustavo Bolívar
- Directed by: Lilo Villaplana; Alfonso Pineda
- Creative directors: Esmeralda Barrón; Carlos Herrera
- Starring: Mauricio Islas; Irán Castillo; Marisol del Olmo; Sara Maldonado; Miguel Rodarte; Gerardo Taracena; Roberto Mateos; Alejandro de la Madrid; Claudio Lafarga
- Country of origin: Mexico
- Original language: Spanish
- No. of seasons: 1
- No. of episodes: 60 (Note: 60 episodes in the Mexican version, and 58 in the version of Telemundo.) (list of episodes)

Production
- Executive producer: Horacio Díaz Morales
- Producers: Perla Martínez Legorreta; Aurelio Valcárcel Carroll
- Production company: TeleMéxico Studios

Original release
- Network: Imagen Televisión
- Release: November 7, 2016 – January 27, 2017

Related
- El Capo

Perseguidos, also known as El Capo, is a Mexican telenovela produced by Horacio Díaz Morales for Imagen Televisión together with TeleMéxico Studios. It is a remake of the Colombian series, El Capo. It stars Mauricio Islas as the titular character.

== Plot ==
The series presents José Vicente Solís Armenta, a delinquent who is prosecuted by the state, tried and condemned to the maximum penalty for crimes against humanity. By being betrayed, the authorities finally manage to track him down and want him dead or alive. Solis Armenta, as he escapes, has to deal with his wife whom he deceived, one of his lovers who seeks to assassinate him and a bodyguard who seems to succumb to his charms.

== Cast ==
=== Main ===
- Mauricio Islas as José Vicente Solís Armenta / El Capo
- Irán Castillo as Sofía Cáseres
- Marisol del Olmo as María Guadalupe Luján Flores
- Sara Maldonado as La Perris
- Miguel Rodarte as Pancho Solís Armenta
- Gerardo Taracena as Gustavo Benítez / Tavo
- Roberto Mateos as Hernán Molina
- Alejandro de la Madrid as Uribe
- Claudio Lafarga as Sergio Machado / Checo

=== Recurring ===
- Mauricio Rousselon as Juan José "Jay" Solís
- Isabel Burr as Camila Solís
- Guillermo Quintanilla as General Payró
- Verónica Merchant as Irene
- Gustavo Sánchez Parra as Coronel Avilés
- Julio Bracho as Señor H
- Valentina Acosta as Connie
- Javier Díaz Dueñas as General Segovia
- Mimi Morales as Valeria Buenrostro
- Pablo Cruz Guerrero as Emiliano
- Ariane Pellicer as Doña Esperanza Armenta
- Eduardo Arroyuelo as Agente Barrales
- Mario Loría as Teniente Monroe
- Ricardo Polanco as Eduardo Solís Armenta
- Melissa Barrera as Laura Solis

== Problems and broadcast ==
The premiere of the series was scheduled for October 31, 2016. However, El Capo quickly came under a firestorm of criticism. The presidents of the Radio and Television Commissions in the Senate and Chamber of Deputies wrote a letter asking the RTC, Mexico's broadcast content regulator, and the Federal Telecommunications Institute to take action against Imagen Televisión, which aired the novela, for broadcasting a "narcoseries". The network may have feared that the program would receive a D rating from the RTC, in which case it could not air before midnight; days before the planned October 31 premiere, the title was changed to Perseguidos (Pursued) for its run on Imagen.

The series was broadcast from November 7, 2016 until January 27, 2017. In the United States the series premiered on April 4, 2017 in the timeslot of 10pm/9c with its original name, "El Capo". Due to the low rating of the series, Telemundo changed the schedule of the series to 8pm/7c.

=== U.S. broadcast ===
The following is a list of episodes with titles and release dates in the United States, the ratings are also shown.

No.	Title	Original release date	US viewers (millions)
1	"Cacería humana"	April 4, 2017	1.50
The National Intelligence deploys an operation to catch José Vicente Solís Armenta, El Capo. He fled and took refuge in a bunker. A cell peals and reveals its location. Is in danger.
2	"La trampa"	April 5, 2017	1.44
El Capo and Sofía talk about extradition. They fear for their life. The director of the CIN orders the withdrawal, but it is a decoy to intercept the most wanted drug trafficker of Mexico.
3	"El coraje de Perris"	April 6, 2017	1.44
The divers of the Navy arrive and the lives of all, in the bunker, hanging on a thread. In exchange for five million dollars, La Perris plays a life. Bet on being rich or die trying.
4	"Descubren al monstruo"	April 7, 2017	1.20
Sofía, the journalist and lover next to Guadalupe talk about the past of El Capo and discover the true narco-trafficker and murderer they have face to face. His wife can not believe it.
5	"Más que una amante"	April 10, 2017	1.30
José Vicente declares that his relationship with Sofía is no small thing, even exasperated by the constant claims of his wife, the threat with the gun, but Sofía interposes. Perris returns.
6	"Como gata enjaulada"	April 11, 2017	1.33
María Guadalupe tries to leave the bunker. José Vicente cuts her off and orders the two women to enter the cell and fight. Maria Guadalupe takes the brother-in-law's weapon. They send Sofía through the tunnel.
7	"Sometidos en el búnker"	April 12, 2017	1.41
Sofía and Valeria inform Avilés that Sofía saw Capo in the mountains. They discover the entrance of the bunker, but the agents fall prisoners. JJ does not know that Sofía and El Capo are lovers.
8	"Bombardeo"	April 13, 2017	1.41
Hache decides to bomb the lake. Connie warns Aviles of the bombing. The official order arrives: evacuate the area before ten minutes. In the bunker, the flight is slow and panic reigns.
9	"Infiel bajo amenaza"	April 14, 2017	1.09
For José Vicente saving money is a priority. JJ tells him trash and the Capo punches him. María Guadalupe, with gun in hand, challenges him to tell him how many more he was unfaithful.
10	"A punto de suicidio"	April 17, 2017	1.38
Pancho points with a gun to the head before the imminence of drowning, blaming his brother. Sofía is desperate in the bunker. He tells José Vicente that he will reveal a secret.
11	"Al borde de la muerte"	April 18, 2017	1.32
José Vicente does not leave, where the others have found an area to breathe in the middle of the flood. Perris is looking for him. It brings him unconscious. You are given resuscitation maneuvers.
12	"Operativo contra el CIN"	April 19, 2017	1.31
13	"Buscan al infiltrado"	April 20, 2017	1.20
14	"Pasión y obsesión"	April 21, 2017	1.14
15	"Confesión de un asesino"	April 24, 2017	1.19
16	"Barrales en evidencia"	April 25, 2017	0.96
17	"Amor imposible"	April 26, 2017	1.07
18	"El Capo mataría por Perris"	April 28, 2017	0.96
19	"El hijo de El Capo miente"	May 1, 2017	1.01
20	"El atentado sin freno"	May 2, 2017	1.00
21	"La revelación de Sofía"	May 3, 2017	0.93
22	"Como animal enjaulado"	May 4, 2017	0.96
23	"Camila, la informante"	May 5, 2017	0.80
24	"Un amor compartido"	May 8, 2017	0.85
25	"Fugados y en peligro"	May 9, 2017	0.97
26	"Atrapan al infiltrado"	May 10, 2017	0.92
27	"Dolorosa despedida"	May 11, 2017	0.91
28	"Conquista de una noche"	May 12, 2017	0.75
29	"Exterminio"	May 15, 2017	0.98
30	"Entrega negociada"	May 16, 2017	1.00
31	"Capturados"	May 17, 2017	0.99
32	"Jugosa recompensa"	May 18, 2017	0.96
33	"Batallas en prisión"	May 19, 2017	0.75
34	"Estrategia de narco"	May 22, 2017	0.87
35	"El poder de la prensa"	May 23, 2017	0.86
36	"Camila, dispuesta a todo"	May 24, 2017	0.88
37	"Intento de soborno"	May 25, 2017	0.89
38	"El Capo se quiebra"	May 26, 2017	0.81
39	"Atentan contra El Capo"	May 29, 2017	0.97
40	"Enemigos a muerte"	May 30, 2017	1.11
41	"Olfato de narco"	May 31, 2017	1.10
42	"Se filtra la primicia"	June 1, 2017	0.98
43	"Funcionario intachable"	June 2, 2017	0.80
44	"Secuestro, la otra carta"	June 5, 2017	0.87
45	"Lo creen muerto"	June 6, 2017	0.99
46	"La noticia corre como pólvora"	June 7, 2017	0.91
47	"Se hace invisible"	June 8, 2017	0.89
48	"La obsesión de Uribe"	June 9, 2017	0.77
49	"Testigo de su funeral"	June 12, 2017	0.95
50	"Mensajero y mendigo"	June 13, 2017	0.94
51	"Delatora"	June 14, 2017	1.06
52	"El regreso de la muerte"	June 15, 2017	1.04
53	"Nuevos socios"	June 16, 2017	0.86
54	"Operativo relámpago"	June 19, 2017	1.08
55	"El Capo destapa la olla"	June 21, 2017	1.12
56	"Sofía, la pista clave"	June 22, 2017	1.16
57	"Batirse a duelo"	June 23, 2017	0.95
58	"Francotirador al acecho"	June 26, 2017	1.12
Valencia, Claudio and the sniper trade. They make a deal: kill El Capo with a shot in the head. José Vicente and María Guadalupe say goodbye. He gives Sofía a gun to kill him.
