= Las Malcriadas =

Mexican telenovela

- Genre: Telenovela
- Created by: César Sierra
- Screenplay by: José Miguel Núñez; Carmen Madrid; César Sierra
- Story by: Ximena Escalante
- Directed by: Moisés Urquidi; Raúl Caballero
- Starring: Sara Maldonado; Ernesto Laguardia; Gonzalo García Vivanco; Rebecca Jones
- Opening theme: "La Criada" by Amandititita
- Country of origin: Mexico
- Original language: Spanish
- No. of episodes: 103

Production
- Executive producers: Joshua Mintz; Ana Celia Urquidi
- Producers: Emilia Lamothe; Mónica Skorlich
- Editors: Fernando Rodríguez; Rigel Sosa
- Camera setup: Multi-camera
- Production company: TV Azteca

Original release
- Network: Azteca Uno
- Release: September 18, 2017 – February 9, 2018

Las Malcriadas (English: Bad Maids) is a Mexican telenovela produced and directed by Joshua Mintz for TV Azteca. It is an original story by Ximena Escalante and written by César Sierra and Carlos Madrid and directed by Mintz, Moisés Urquidi and Raúl Caballero. It stars Sara Maldonado as the titular character. Production started on June 28, 2017 and it premiered on September 18, 2017.

== Plot ==
The series follows the story of Laura (Sara Maldonado), a young journalist who suffers the loss of her mother and cleaning her personal belongings, discovers evidence that leads her to assume that her biological mother was another woman. Full of sadness for the death of her adoptive mother and with anger towards her family for having lied to her, Laura makes the most difficult decision of her life and decides to look for information that leads her to find the whereabouts of the woman who gave her life. In this process she discovers that her journey is more dangerous than she imagined, and will have to face a series of experiences that she never imagined to live—In this way—Laura will meet four other brave women, full of dreams, and with an immense desire to get ahead, who will be their companions of adventures. However, she will also encounter dark characters who will do what is necessary for Laura not to discover everything behind her origin. Later, Laura and these women will be identified by the press and society as Las Malcriadas, as they are accused of some crimes.

== Cast ==
=== Main ===
- Sara Maldonado as Laura Espinosa
- Ernesto Laguardia as Mario Espinosa
- Gonzalo García Vivanco as Diego Mendoza
- Rebecca Jones as Catalina Basurto

=== Recurring ===
- Carlos Torres as Jerónimo Aguirre
- Ivonne Montero as Rosa Ochoa
- Cynthia Rodríguez as Teresa Villa
- Alejandra Ambrosi as Stephanie Basurto
- Juanita Arias as Esmirna Benavente
- Elsa Ortiz as Dunia García
- Javier Díaz Dueñas as Julian
- Rodrigo Cachero as Joaquín Figueroa
- Martín Barba as Eduardo Espinosa
- Blanca Calderón as TBA
- Mar Carrera as Lidia
- Laura Palma as Gabriela Rodríguez de Figueroa / Úrsula
- Ernesto Álvarez as Silvio Luna
- Sebastián Caicedo as Jaime Rosales
- Vince Miranda as Acevedo
- Heriberto Méndez as ablo Jiménez
- Alexis Meana as Andrés Jiménez
- Anna Carreiro as Sabrina Altieri
- Verónica Terán as Martha
- Jorge Fink as Fermín Rojas
- Anna Silvia Garza as Cruz Palacios
- Fátima Molina as Yuridia Cavarca
- Andrea Torre as Brenda
- Gina Moret as Irma
- Bárbara Falconi as Avelina
- Daniela Berriel as TBA
- Carlos Girón as Mateo Altieri
- Dasha Santoyo as TBA
- Andrea Carreiro as TBA
- Camila Rojas as Concha
- Margarita Vega as TBA
- Héctor Parra as TBA
- Carlos Álvarez as TBA
- David Alejandro as TBA
- Mabel Cadena as Juanita Ortiz Joven
- Ulises Ávila as TBA
- Dolores Heredia as Juana
- Héctor Parra

== Ratings ==
Viewership and ratings per season of Las Malcriadas
| Season | Timeslot (ET) | Episodes | First aired | | Last aired | | Avg. viewers (millions) | 18–49 rank |
| Season | Timeslot (ET) | Episodes | Date | Viewers (millions) | Date | Viewers (millions) | Avg. viewers (millions) | 18–49 rank |
|---|---|---|---|---|---|---|---|---|
| 1 | Mon–Fri 9:30pm | 103 | September 18, 2017 | 1.5 | February 9, 2018 | 1.3 | TBD | TBD |
