= Julieta Grajales =

Mexican actress (born 1986)

- Born: April 24, 1986 (age 38); Tuxtla Gutiérrez, Mexico
- Occupation: Actress
- Years active: 2010–present
- Partner: LP (2016; 2019–2022)

Julieta Grajales (born April 24, 1986) is a Mexican actress, She is known for her roles in the telenovelas and series as La Taxista, El Chema, El Señor de los Cielos and La Impostora.

Her first appearance was in the TV Azteca's telenovela Vidas robadas in 2010, appeared in 2012 Telemundo's telenovela La Impostora as Catalina Echeverría Estrada de Altamira, she had a friendship and then a relationship with the American singer Laura Pergolizzi (known as: LP) which began in 2019 and participated in the music video How Low Can You Go in 2021, the short-lived relationship ended in May 2022.

== Filmography ==
=== Films ===
Year	Title	Roles	Notes
–	Feliz Año Nuevo	Brenda	Short film (with Gabriel Nuncio)

=== Television roles ===
Year	Title	Roles	Notes
2010	Vidas robadas	Nora	Recurring role: 3 episodes
2012	Rosa Diamante	Maria Corina Villalta	1 episode
2013	Niñas mal	Bibi	1 episodes
2014	La impostora	Catalina Echeverría Estrada de Altamira	Recurring role; 102 episodes
2016	Un día cualquiera	Maricruz	1 episode
2017	Maldita Tentación	Violeta	1 episode (2017)
2016–2017	El Chema	Regina Campo	Recurring role; 75 episodes
2017	El Señor de los Cielos	Regina Campo	El Señor de los Cielos fifth season; 1 episodes
2018–2019	La Taxista	Susana "Susy" Pizarro	Recurring role; 17 episodes
2019	La bandida	Marina Aedo / Young Graciela Olmos	Recurring role; 31 episodes
2022	Lotería del crimen	Victoria Vargas	Lead role
2023	Los 50	Herself	Contestant

=== Music videos ===
Year	Title	Artist(s)	Role	Ref.
2021	"How Low Can You Go"	LP	Herself (along LP)	
