= 2033 (film) =

- Directed by: Francisco Laresgoiti
- Screenplay by: Jordi Mariscal
- Produced by: Yvette Gurza
- Starring: Miguel Couturier, Sandra Echeverría, Alonso Echánove
- Cinematography: Luis David Sansans
- Edited by: Carlos Puente
- Music by: Daniel Hidalgo
- Production companies: La Casa de Cine, Filmica Villaparaiso
- Distributed by: Cinema Epoch (United States)
- Release dates: 24 September 2009 (Lund, Sweden)
- Running time: 100 minutes
- Country: Mexico
- Language: Spanish
- Budget: $5,000,000 (estimated)

2033 also billed as 2033: Future Apocalypse (in Spanish as 2033: La Ilusion de un Futuro Mejor) is a Mexican film that premiered on 24 September 2009 at the Fantastisk Film Festival Lund, Sweden). The film is directed by Francisco Laresgoiti, at his directorial debut. Regarding the title, Laresgotiti said that he "initially call it VCR 2026, (Viva Cristo Rey 2026), the motto of the Cristeros, as this would define the ideology of the tape, but decided to use 2033 as this will be the two thousandth anniversary the death of Jesus Christ." The film was intended to be a trilogy, but the two sequels had not been written as of 2008.

== Synopsis ==
The film is set in the year 2033 in a dystopian view of the future, in Mexico City which by that time has been renamed Villaparaiso (Paradise City). The totalitarian militaristic/corporate government has outlawed the freedom of expression and religion in general. The government maintains control through pharmaceutical additions to the food and drink supply, which at the same time includes toxic chemicals.

The protagonist is Lozada a lawyer whose true identity is "Father Miguel", the leader of a revolutionary movement. He is a priest of a religion that is a fusion of many religions, the focus in the film is a kind of theology of freedom; he is also a leader of the revolutionary movement that wants to free people from the government. He befriends Pablo, a rich and pampered man who believed that he was orphaned, who is in the leadership program of the military government. Lozada informs him that his father is actually a prisoner of the government. After hearing this, Pablo joins the organization to rescue his father and overthrow the government.

== Reviews ==
Reviews for the film were mixed. Newcity recommended the film while rating it a "B−" Time Out Chicago reviewer Kevin B. Lee called the film "A dystopian Mexican thriller emphasizes mood at the expense of character" and that "the screenplay’s political provocations collapse into generic telenovela suspense."

== Releases ==
- 24 September 2009 – Fantastisk Film Festival, Lund, Sweden (premiere)
- 5 February 2010 – Mexico
- 1 May 2010 – Sci-Fi-London Film Festival

== Cast ==
- Miguel Couturier ... Stam
- Sandra Echeverría ... Lucía
- Alonso Echánove ... Pec
- Luis Ernesto Franco ... Milo
- Genaro Hernandez ... Ing. de camaras
- Claudio Lafarga ... Pablo
- Raúl Méndez ... Goros
- Marco Antonio Treviño ... Lozado/ Padre Miguel
