= Un día cualquiera =

- Genre: Drama
- Written by: Eric Vonn
- Directed by: Javier Patrón; Fabián Corres
- Presented by: Alberto Casanova
- Country of origin: Mexico
- Original language: Spanish
- No. of seasons: 1
- No. of episodes: 52

Production
- Executive producer: Fides Velasco
- Producer: Jacky Castro
- Camera setup: Multi-camera
- Production company: TV Azteca

Original release
- Network: Azteca Trece
- Release: 15 August – 28 October 2016

Un día cualquiera is a Mexican anthology television series that premiered on Azteca Trece on 15 August 2016, and concluded on 28 October 2016. The series is presented by Alberto Casanova as himself. In each episode three stories are shown, of which two are true and one is false.

== Cast ==
- Carolina Miranda as Marilupe / Annette / Liliana (episodes, "El órgano reproductor masculino" and "Gemelos")

== Episodes ==
No.	Title	Directed by	Written by	Original release date
1	"Suicidios"	Fabián Corres & Javier Patrón	Eric Vonn	15 August 2016
2	"Misandria, odio a los hombres"	Javier Patrón	Eric Vonn	16 August 2016
3	"Fabián Corres"	Javier Patrón	Eric Vonn	17 August 2016
4	"Conductores de TV"	Javier Patrón	Eric Vonn	18 August 2016
5	"Mujeres fantasmas"	Javier Patrón	Eric Vonn	19 August 2016
