= Jerry Velázquez =

Mexican actor (born 1990)

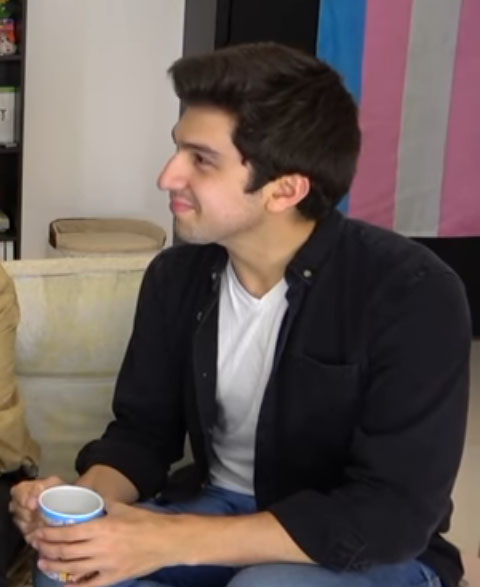
- Born: Gerardo de Jesús Velázquez Molina; March 30, 1990 (age 34); Mérida, Yucatán, Mexico
- Occupations: Actor; musician
- Years active: 2007–present
- Musical career
- Genres: Pop rock
- Instruments: Vocals; guitar; piano
- Labels: Walt Disney Records

Gerardo de Jesús "Jerry" Velázquez Molina (born March 30, 1990) is a Mexican actor and musician.

== Career and personal life ==
He was born on March 30, 1990, in Mérida, Yucatán. His first approaches to music and theater were at festivals and school musicals. In 2007 he participated in High School Musical, La Selección talent contest by TV Azteca and Disney Channel, where he was a finalist. He participated in the recording of 2 albums distributed by Sony BMG, the supporting tour and the film High School Musical: el desafío. Subsequently, in such musicals as A Midsummer's Night Dream and Hairspray. He also dubbed in cartoons as Teenage Mutant Ninja Turtles, Pokémon, Phineas and Ferb, among others. He starred in the series Cuando toca la campana for Disney Channel Latin America playing "DJ".

Velázquez is gay.

== Filmography ==
=== Film ===
Year	Title	Role	Notes
2008	High School Musical: El desafio	Gerardo	Film Debut
2019	Aladdin	Aladdin (voice)	Dubbed voice for Latin America.
2022	My Mother-in-law Hates Me	Pato	

=== Televisión ===
Year	Title	Role	Notes
2007	High School Musical: La Seleccion	Himself	Reality Show on Disney Channel Latin America
2011	Cuando toca la campana	DJ	Lead role, Short-form series for Disney Channel Latin America
2013	Violetta	DJ	Recurring role

== Singles ==
Song	Year	Album
No quiero ser uno mas	2011	Cuando toca la campana
A Celebrar	2011	Cuando toca la campana
Cuando toca la campana	2011	Cuando toca la campana
Unete a esta fiesta	2011	Cuando toca la campana
