= Claudio Lafarga =

Mexican actor

- Born: July 25, 1979 (age 45); Mexico City, Distrito Federal, Mexico
- Occupation: Actor

Claudio Lafarga (born July 25, 1979, in Mexico City, Distrito Federal, Mexico), is a Mexican actor. He is known for his work on XY. La revista (2009), 2033 (2009) and Alicia en el país de María (2014).

== Filmography ==
=== Film roles ===
Year	Title	Roles	Notes
2009	2033	Pablo	
2011	Viernes de Ánimas: El camino de las flores	Hugo	
2014	Obediencia perfecta	Sacramento's father	
2014	Alicia en el país de María	Tonatiuh	
2016	Treintona, soltera y fantástica	Emilio	
2017	El que busca encuentra	Marcos Aguado	
2020	El mesero	Lic. Patrick	
2022	Two Plus Two	Carlos	

=== Television roles ===
Year	Title	Roles	Notes
2009–2012	XY. La revista	Adrián Campos	Recurring role (seasons 1–3); 30 episodes
2010	Capadocia	Miguel Aguilar	Episode: "La mujer de Lot"
2013	Hombre tenías que ser	Leopoldo "Polito" Beltrán	Series regular
2014–2015	Los miserables	Dr. Gonzalo Mallorca	Recurring role; 83 episodes
2015	Caminos de Guanajuato	Darío Rivero	Recurring role; 6 episodes
2016	Un día cualquiera	Adolfo	Episode: "Casos médicos poco comunes"
2016–2017	Perseguidos	Sergio "Checo" Machado	Recurring role; 23 episodes
2017	Guerra de ídolos	Lorenzo Treviño	Recurring role; 59 episodes
2018	Rosario Tijeras	Gabriel	Recurring role (season 2); 11 episodes
2019	Sitiados: México	Marcial	Recurring role; 8 episodes
2019	Cita a ciegas	El ilusionista	Recurring role; 4 episodes
2019	Preso No. 1	Emanuel Porrúa	Recurring role; 41 episodes
2020	M.D.: Life on the Line	Jaime	Episode: "Es hora de ponerle un alto"
2020	Los pecados de Bárbara	Nicanor	Series regular; 47 episodes
2020	Esta historia me suena	Esteban	Episode: "Como quien pierde una estrella"
2021	Narcos: Mexico	Claudio Vazquez	3 episodes
2021	Malverde: El Santo Patrón	Donato Juarez	3 episodes
2022	María Félix: La Doña	Enrique Álvarez	
2022	Lotería del crimen	Bruno Barraza	Protagonist

== Awards and nominations ==
Year	Association	Category	Nominated works	Result
2011	Monte-Carlo TV Festival	Outstanding Actor - Drama Series	XY. La revista	Nominated
