= Sara Maldonado =

Mexican actress

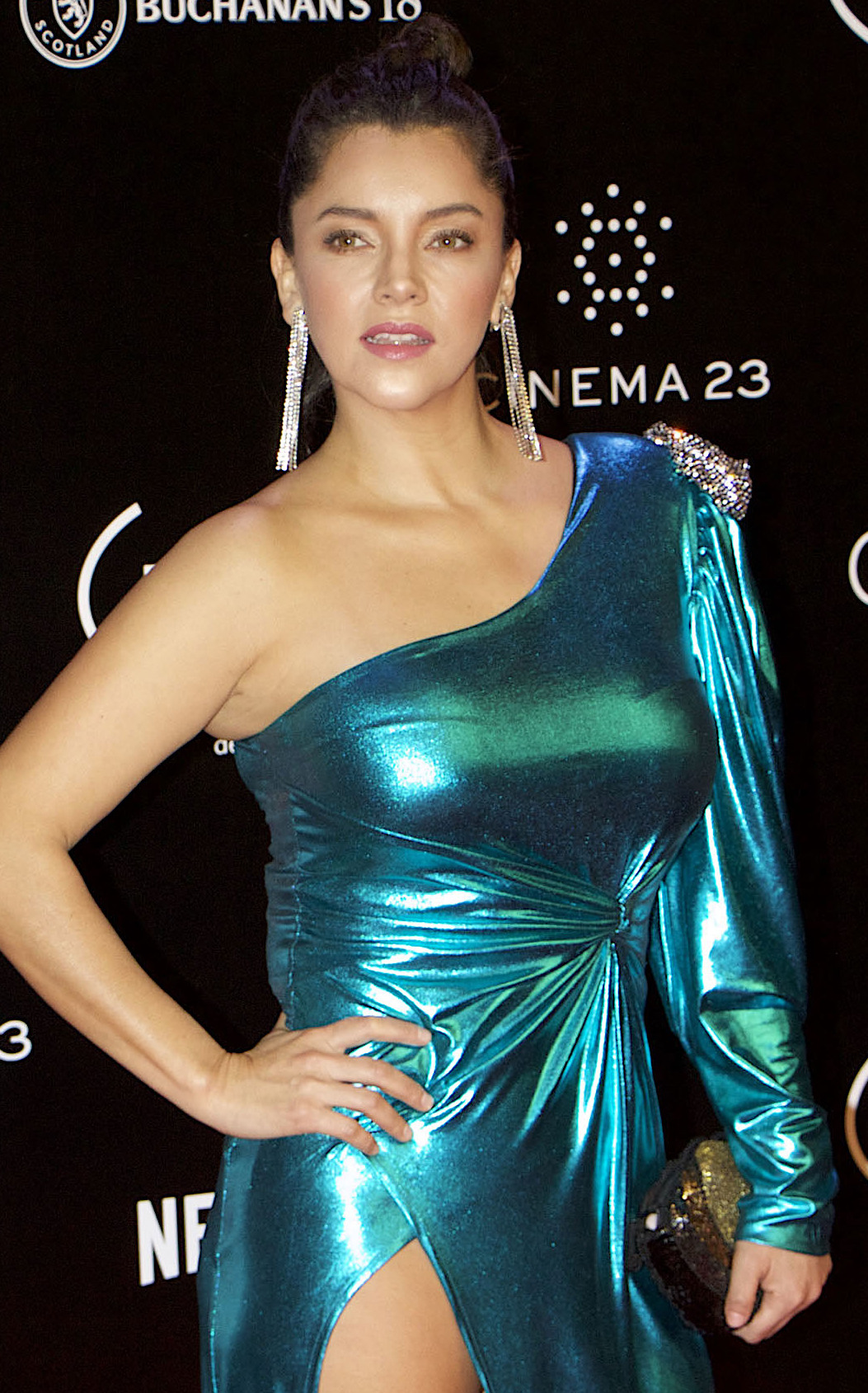
- Maldonado in November 2018
- Born: Sara Maldonado Fuentes; 10 March 1980 (age 45); Xalapa, Veracruz, Mexico
- Occupation: Actress
- Years active: 2001–present

Sara Maldonado Fuentes (born March 10, 1980) is a Mexican actress, better known for her role as Lorena Alvarez from El juego de la vida, which was her first main role and her first telenovela. After this, she was the protagonist in other teenage soap operas like Clase 406 and Corazones al límite. She is also known as Camelia Pineda "La Texana" from Camelia la Texana and other main roles.

== Biography ==
Maldonado was born in Xalapa, Veracruz, Mexico to parents Sara Fuentes and Mario Maldonado. She has two older brothers, Mario and Jesús, and one sister, Fabiola. She studied acting at the Centro de Educación Artística of Televisa for two years. In 2004, Maldonado also studied English and acting while residing in Vancouver, British Columbia, Canada. She participated in the Mexican beauty contest "El Rostro del Heraldo", which was organized by newspaper El Heraldo de México, and won first place.

== Career ==
Maldonado made her acting debut as the protagonist in the Televisa telenovela El juego de la vida (2001) as the role of Lorena "Lore" Alvarez. From 2002 to 2003, she starred in the teen telenovela hit Clase 406 as Tatiana "Tatis" del Moral. In April 2004, she was chosen again to the leading role as Diana Antillón de la Reguera in the Televisa telenovela Corazones al límite. She played the role as Paulina Cervantes Bravo in another Televisa telenovela Mundo de fieras. In 2008, she played the lead role as Aymar Lazcano Mayú in another Televisa telenovela Tormenta en el paraíso.

From November 2010 to May 2011, she played the title role in the Telemundo telenovela Aurora for the first 103 episodes, before her character was killed off, following her dismissal from the show. She also had a part La Reina del Sur (2011) as "La Verónica". She also starred in the telenovelas El octavo mandamiento as Camila San Millán (one episode, 2011) and Camelia la Texana (2014–15).

== Filmography ==
Television roles
Year	Title	Roles	Notes
2001–2002	El juego de la vida	Lorena "Lore" Álvarez	Main role; 165 episodes
2002–2003	Clase 406	Tatiana "Tatis" del Moral	Main role (seasons 2-4); 50 episodes
2004	Corazones al límite	Diana Antillón de la Reguera	Main role; 145 episodes
2006–2007	Mundo de fieras	Paulina Cervantes Bravo	Main role; 120 episodes
2006	Amor mío	Paulina	Episode: "Dramón telenovelero"
2007	El Pantera	La Monja	Episode: "La Monja"
2007	Trece miedos	Vanessa	Episode: "Vive"
2007–2008	Tormenta en el paraíso	Aymar Lazcano Mayú	Main role; 185 episodes
2010	El octavo mandamiento	Camila San Millán	Main role; 130 episodes
2010–2011	Aurora	Aurora Ponce de León	Main role; 103 episodes
2010	Capadocia	Monserrat "Monse" Olmos	Recurring role (season 2); 9 episodes
2011	La Reina del Sur	Verónica Cortés / Guadalupe Romero	Main role (season 1); 25 episodes
2014	Camelia la Texana	Camelia Pineda "La Texana"	Main role; 60 episodes
2016–2017	Perseguidos	Patricia Arévalo "La Perris"	Main role; 30 episodes
2017–2018	Las Malcriadas	Laura Espinosa Urrutia / Laura González Ruiz	Main role; 103 episodes
2019	Los elegidos	Jimena García	Main role; 34 episodes
2019	+Noche	María	1 episode
2022	El Galán	Sofía	
2022	Mujeres asesinas	Alejandra	Episode: "La condena"
2023–present	Lotería del crimen	Ariel Aragón	Main role (season 2-present)
2024	¿Quién es la máscara?	Orni	Season 6 contestant

Film roles
Year	Title	Roles
2022	MexZombies	Mamá Cronos

Theatre
Year	Title	Roles
2003–2004	El Graduado	Elaine Robinson

Music videos
Year	Title	Singer
2003	"Quién te dijo"	Luis Fonsi

== Awards and nominations ==
Year	Award	Category	Works	Result
2011	Premios People en Español	Best Actress	Aurora	Won
