= Lotería del crimen =

Mexican TV series

- Genre: Thriller; Detective drama
- Created by: Adrián Ortega Echegollén
- Directed by: Carlos Carrera
- Creative director: Adrián Ortega Echegollén
- Starring: Claudio Lafarga; Julieta Grajales; Arnoldo Picazzo; Francisco Vázquez; Tamara Niño de Rivera; Lupita Sandoval; Jerry Velázquez; Jorge Fink; Tatiana del Real; Angélica Lara; Sara Maldonado; Alejandra Herrera; Cuauhtli Jiménez
- Country of origin: Mexico
- Original language: Spanish
- No. of seasons: 5
- No. of episodes: 120

Production
- Executive producer: Rodrigo Hernández Cruz
- Producers: Luis Merlo; Martín Garza
- Production location: Mexico City
- Editors: Ana García; Victoria Mariño; Alejandro Arriaga; Valeria Rivera Azocar
- Camera setup: Multi-camera
- Running time: 46 Minutes
- Production company: TV Azteca

Original release
- Network: Azteca 7
- Release: 10 October 2022 – present

Lotería del crimen (English: Crime Lottery) is a Mexican thriller detective drama television series produced by Adrián Ortega Echegollén and Rodrigo Hernández Cruz for TV Azteca in 2022. The series centers on a group of detectives attached to a police intelligence unit where they have to solve clues to find the criminals. The series premiered on Azteca 7 on 10 October 2022. It stars an ensemble cast, including Claudio Lafarga, Julieta Grajales and Sara Maldonado.

In January 2026, the series was renewed for a fifth season that premiered on 12 October 2026.

== Plot ==
Police detectives Bruno Barraza and Victoria Vargas, belonging to the UNIC (Unidad de Inteligencia Criminal; i.e: Criminal Intelligence Unit), try to uncover several murderers who are still on the loose in Mexico City and continue to commit more murders, and whom they must arrest.

== Cast ==
- Claudio Lafarga as Bruno Barraza
- Julieta Grajales as Victoria Vargas (season 1)
- Arnoldo Picazzo as Eligio Enciso
- Francisco Vázquez as Ricardo Romero "El Recio" (seasons 1–3; guest star season 4)
- Tamara Niño de Rivera as Sofía Salabeth
- Lupita Sandoval as Marieta "Mari" Martínez
- Jerry Velázquez as Jonathan Yáñez (season 1)
- Jorge Fink as Tito Tavares (seasons 1–3)
- Tatiana del Real as Luisa López (seasons 1–2; guest star season 3)
- Angélica Lara as Nancy Delfina (seasons 1–2; guest star season 3)
- Sara Maldonado as Ariel Aragón (season 2–present)
- Alejandra Herrera as Guadalupe "Gigi" González (season 2–present)
- Cuauhtli Jiménez as Marco Mora (season 4)

== Production ==
On 2 February 2022, Sandra Smester, then vice president of Azteca Uno and general director of content and distribution of TV Azteca, announced in an interview the new programming for the main channels of said broadcaster, which included Lotería del crimen as one of the fiction productions. The production of the series began filming on 27 June 2022. The stage direction and cameras are in charge of filmmaker Carlos Carrera and the photography is in charge of Ricardo Garfias. The first season has 24 episodes contemplated for broadcast.

On 18 January 2023, TV Azteca renewed the series for a second season. In February 2023, Sara Maldonado joined the cast as a new main character, Ariel Aragón, for the second season. Production of the season began in May 2023. The third season premiered on 6 November 2023. On 23 January 2024, TV Azteca renewed the series for a third season. The third season premiered on 10 June 2024.

On 22 January 2025, TV Azteca renewed the series for a fourth season. The fourth season premiered on 2 June 2025. On 20 January 2026, TV Azteca renewed the series for a fifth season. The fifth season premiered on 12 October 2026.

== Episodes ==
Season	Episodes	Originally released	
Season	Episodes	First released	Last released
1	24	10 October 2022	17 November 2022
2	24	6 November 2023	13 December 2023
3	24	10 June 2024	18 July 2024
4	24	2 June 2025	10 July 2025
5	24	12 October 2026	19 November 2026

=== Season 1 (2022) ===
No. overall	No. in season	Title	Directed by	Written by	Original release date	Mexico viewers (millions)
1	1	"El Brujo"	Carlos Carrera	Alfredo Mendoza	10 October 2022	0.48
2	2	"El Huérfano"	Carlos Carrera	Ana Romero	11 October 2022	0.57
3	3	"El Fotógrafo"	Carlos Carrera	Ricardo Avilés	12 October 2022	0.69
4	4	"El Matraquero"	Carlos Carrera	Heriberto Mujíca	13 October 2022	0.56
5	5	"La Tóxica"	Rodrigo Hernández Cruz	Celia Kim	17 October 2022	0.57
6	6	"Los Enamorados"	Rodrigo Hernández Cruz	Paulina Barros	18 October 2022	0.55
7	7	"El Tatuador"	Carlos Carrera	Adrián Mazoy	19 October 2022	0.78
8	8	"El Ejecutivo"	Carlos Carrera	Adrián Ortega Echegollén	20 October 2022	0.64
9	9	"La Casera"	Carlos Carrera	Alfredo Mendoza	24 October 2022	0.54
10	10	"Las Cortadoras"	Carlos Carrera	Alfredo Mendoza	25 October 2022	0.61
11	11	"La Vendedora"	Rodrigo Hernández Cruz	Celia Kim	26 October 2022	0.70
12	12	"El Astrólogo"	Rodrigo Hernández Cruz	Ana Romero	27 October 2022	0.83
13	13	"La Ciudadora"	Carlos Carrera	Heriberto Mujíca	31 October 2022	0.62
14	14	"La Tintorera"	Carlos Carrera	David Mascareño	1 November 2022	0.56
15	15	"Los Goteros"	Carlos Carrera	Paulina Barros	2 November 2022	0.56
16	16	"La Niña"	Carlos Carrera	Ricardo Avilés	3 November 2022	0.69
17	17	"La Actriz"	Carlos Carrera	Adrián Mazoy	7 November 2022	0.82
18	18	"El Músico"	Rodrigo Hernández Cruz	David Mascareño	8 November 2022	0.74
19	19	"El Técnico"	Rodrigo Hernández Cruz	Ana Romero	9 November 2022	0.70
20	20	"El Guapo"	Carlos Carrera	Ana Romero	10 November 2022	0.68
21	21	"El Imitador"	Rodrigo Hernández Cruz	Heriberto Mujíca	14 November 2022	0.75
22	22	"El Maquillista"	Rodrigo Hernández Cruz	Alfredo Mendoza	15 November 2022	0.98
23	23	"La Picadora"	Carlos Carrera	Ana Romero	16 November 2022	0.78
24	24	"El Alpinista"	Carlos Carrera	Alfredo Mendoza	17 November 2022	0.79

=== Season 2 (2023) ===
No. overall	No. in season	Title	Directed by	Written by	Original release date	Mexico viewers (millions)
25	1	"El Alpinista 2"	Carlos Carrera	Alfredo Mendoza	6 November 2023	0.81
26	2	"La Inversionista"	Carlos Carrera	Ana Romero	7 November 2023	0.72
27	3	"La Taquera"	Carlos Carrera	Karen Espinal	8 November 2023	0.87
28	4	"El Artista"	Carlos Carrera	Heriberto Mojica	9 November 2023	0.94
29	5	"La Luchadora"	Carlos Carrera	Ana Romero	13 November 2023	0.68
30	6	"El Pelotero"	Carlos Carrera	Karen Espinal	14 November 2023	0.72
31	7	"La Florista"	Carlos Carrera	David Mascareño	15 November 2023	0.68
32	8	"El Carnicero"	Carlos Carrera	Heriberto Mojica	16 November 2023	0.83
33	9	"La Corredora"	Carlos Carrera	Natalia Núñez Silvestri	20 November 2023	0.67
34	10	"El Mecánico"	Carlos Carrera	Raúl Camarena	21 November 2023	N/A
35	11	"La Exterminadora"	Carlos Carrera	Nora Coss	22 November 2023	0.74
36	12	"La Candidata"	Carlos Carrera	Ana Romero	27 November 2023	0.88
37	13	"Los Cirqueros"	Carlos Carrera	Alfredo Mendoza	28 November 2023	0.69
38	14	"La Repartidora"	Carlos Carrera	Karen Espinal	29 November 2023	0.74
39	15	"La Camarista"	Carlos Carrera	Heriberto Mojica	4 December 2023	0.67
40	16	"El Procurador"	Carlos Carrera	David Mascareño	4 December 2023	0.55
41	17	"La Psiquiatra"	Carlos Carrera	Natalia Núñez Silvestri	5 December 2023	0.77
42	18	"El Continuista"	Carlos Carrera	Ana Romero	5 December 2023	0.79
43	19	"El Inventor"	Carlos Carrera	Alfredo Mendoza	6 December 2023	0.69
44	20	"La Lavandera"	Carlos Carrera	Nora Coss	11 December 2023	0.74
45	21	"La Curtidora"	Carlos Carrera	Raúl Camarena	11 December 2023	0.74
46	22	"El Carpintero"	Carlos Carrera	Alfredo Mendoza	12 December 2023	0.68
47	23	"El Carpintero 2"	Carlos Carrera	Ana Romero	13 December 2023	0.74
48	24	"La Reportera"	Carlos Carrera	Alfredo Mendoza	13 December 2023	0.77

=== Season 3 (2024) ===
No. overall	No. in season	Title	Directed by	Written by	Original release date	Mexico viewers (millions)
49	1	"La Reportera 2"	Carlos Carrera	Alfredo Mendoza	10 June 2024	0.95
50	2	"El Copiador"	Carlos Carrera	Nora Coss	11 June 2024	0.76
51	3	"El Macetero"	Carlos Carrera	Heriberto Mujíca	12 June 2024	0.75
52	4	"La Mataperros"	Carlos Carrera	Ana Romero	13 June 2024	0.66
53	5	"La Familia"	Carlos Carrera	Karen Espinal	17 June 2024	0.75
54	6	"El Cuidador"	Carlos Carrera	David Mascareño	18 June 2024	0.77
55	7	"La Optimista"	Carlos Carrera	Ana Romero	19 June 2024	0.94
56	8	"El Cartero"	Carlos Carrera	Alfredo Mendoza	20 June 2024	0.77
57	9	"La Bordadora"	Carlos Carrera	David Mascareño	24 June 2024	0.66
58	10	"La Afiladora"	Carlos Carrera	Nora Coss	25 June 2024	0.86
59	11	"La Vampiro"	Carlos Carrera	Heriberto Mujíca	26 June 2024	0.97
60	12	"El Jugador"	Carlos Carrera	David Mascareño	27 June 2024	0.76
61	13	"El Jugador 2"	Carlos Carrera	David Mascareño	1 July 2024	0.71
62	14	"El Limpiador"	Carlos Carrera	Alfredo Mendoza	2 July 2024	0.77
63	15	"El Académico"	Carlos Carrera	Ana Romero	3 July 2024	0.80
64	16	"Los Curanderos"	Carlos Carrera	Nora Coss	4 July 2024	0.93
65	17	"La Barbera"	Carlos Carrera	Karen Espinal	8 July 2024	0.79
66	18	"El Coleccionista"	Carlos Carrera	Heriberto Mujíca	9 July 2024	0.72
67	19	"El Ángel"	Carlos Carrera	Nora Coss	10 July 2024	0.74
68	20	"El Delegado"	Carlos Carrera	David Mascareño	11 July 2024	0.82
69	21	"La Electricista"	Carlos Carrera	Ana Romero	15 July 2024	0.70
70	22	"El Fanático"	Carlos Carrera	Karen Espinal	15 July 2024	0.70
71	23	"El Juguetero"	Carlos Carrera	Heriberto Mujíca	18 July 2024	0.80
72	24	"El Machetero"	Carlos Carrera	Alfredo Mendoza	18 July 2024	0.69

=== Season 4 (2025) ===
No. overall	No. in season	Title	Directed by	Written by	Original release date	Mexico viewers (millions)
73	1	"El Machetero 2"	Carlos Carrera	Alfredo Mendoza	2 June 2025	1.28
74	2	"La Costurera"	Carlos Carrera	David Mascareño	3 June 2025	1.41
75	3	"El Machetero 3"	Carlos Carrera	Alfredo Mendoza	4 June 2025	1.53
76	4	"La Candidata 2"	Carlos Carrera	David Mascareño	5 June 2025	1.79
77	5	"La Salvadora"	Carlos Carrera	Ana Romero	9 June 2025	1.38
78	6	"El Comediante"	Carlos Carrera	Nora Coss	10 June 2025	1.42
79	7	"El Borracho"	Carlos Carrera	Heriberto Mojica	11 June 2025	1.47
80	8	"La Cazadora"	Carlos Carrera	Raúl Camarena	12 June 2025	1.35
81	9	"El Forense"	Carlos Carrera	Ana Romero	16 June 2025	1.23
82	10	"Los Abuelos"	Carlos Carrera	Karen Espinal	17 June 2025	1.33
83	11	"La Trituradora"	Carlos Carrera	Nora Coss	18 June 2025	1.54
84	12	"El Aprendiz"	Carlos Carrera	Heriberto Mojica	19 June 2025	1.36
85	13	"El Coctelero"	Carlos Carrera	David Mascareño	23 June 2025	1.56
86	14	"La Zapatera"	Carlos Carrera	Ana Romero	24 June 2025	1.59
87	15	"La Roomie"	Carlos Carrera	Nora Coss	25 June 2025	1.52
88	16	"Los Segadores"	Carlos Carrera	Raúl Camarena	26 June 2025	1.44
89	17	"El Cadenero"	Carlos Carrera	David Mascareño	30 June 2025	1.42
90	18	"La Soldadora"	Carlos Carrera	Heriberto Mojica	1 July 2025	1.25
91	19	"Los Carnívoros"	Carlos Carrera	Karen Espinal	2 July 2025	1.38
92	20	"El Trepanador"	Carlos Carrera	Nora Coss	3 July 2025	1.58
93	21	"La Inquisidora"	Carlos Carrera	Ana Romero	7 July 2025	1.48
94	22	"El Conchero"	Carlos Carrera	Heriberto Mojica	8 July 2025	1.71
95	23	"El Cupido"	Carlos Carrera	Alfredo Mendoza	9 July 2025	1.67
96	24	"El Mercenario"	Carlos Carrera	Alfredo Mendoza	10 July 2025	1.52

=== Season 5 (2026) ===
No. overall	No. in season	Title	Directed by	Written by	Original release date	Mexico viewers (millions)
97	1	"El Mercenario 2"	Carlos Carrera	David Mascareño	12 October 2026	0.98
98	2	"La Afiladora 2"	Carlos Carrera	Nora Coss	13 October 2026	0.96
99	3	"La Sexologa"	Carlos Carrera	Ana Romero	14 October 2026	N/A
100	4	"El Mercenario 3"	Carlos Carrera	Raúl Camarena	15 October 2026	1.01
101	5	"La Enfermera"	Carlos Carrera	Karen Espinal	19 October 2026	1.05
102	6	"El Mercenario 4"	Carlos Carrera	David Mascareño	20 October 2026	N/A
103	7	"El Chambelan"	Carlos Carrera	Heriberto Mojica	21 October 2026	N/A
104	8	"El Anarquista"	Carlos Carrera	Raúl Camarena	22 October 2026	0.90
105	9	"El Chófer"	Carlos Carrera	Nora Coss	26 October 2026	1.18
106	10	"La Hermana"	Carlos Carrera	Ana Romero	27 October 2026	0.96
107	11	"Los Célibes"	Carlos Carrera	Heriberto Mojica	28 October 2026	1.25
108	12	"Los Predicadores"	Carlos Carrera	Karen Espinal	29 October 2026	1.16
109	13	"Los Mata Paramédicos"	Carlos Carrera	David Mascareño	2 November 2026	0.85
110	14	"Las Gemelas"	Carlos Carrera	Nora Coss	3 November 2026	0.99
111	15	"La Organillera"	Carlos Carrera	Alfredo Mendoza	4 November 2026	1.18
112	16	"La Stripper"	Carlos Carrera	Karen Espinal	5 November 2026	0.90
113	17	"El Confesor"	Carlos Carrera	Alfredo Mendoza	9 November 2026	0.83
114	18	"El Verdugo"	Carlos Carrera	Heriberto Mojica	10 November 2026	0.93
115	19	"La Ruletera"	Carlos Carrera	Alfredo Mendoza	11 November 2026	0.96
116	20	"El Insomne"	Carlos Carrera	David Mascareño	12 November 2026	0.99
117	21	"La Orientadora"	Carlos Carrera	Ana Romero & Alfredo Mendoza	16 November 2026	1.07
118	22	"El Héroe"	Carlos Carrera	Ana Romero	17 November 2026	1.33
119	23	"La Justiciera"	Carlos Carrera	Nora Coss	18 November 2026	TBD
120	24	"El Sepulturero"	Carlos Carrera	David Mascareño & Alfredo Mendoza	19 November 2026	TBD

== Reception ==
=== Ratings ===
Viewership and ratings per season of Lotería del crimen
Season	Timeslot (CT)	Episodes	First aired		Last aired		Avg. viewers (millions)
Season	Timeslot (CT)	Episodes	Date	Viewers (millions)	Date	Viewers (millions)	Avg. viewers (millions)
1	Mon–Thurs 10:30 p.m.	24	10 October 2022	0.48	17 November 2022	0.79	0.68
2	Mon–Thurs 9:30 p.m.	24	6 November 2023	0.81	13 December 2023	0.77	0.74
3	Mon–Thurs 9:30 p.m.	24	10 June 2024	0.95	18 July 2024	0.69	0.79
4	Mon–Thurs 10:30 p.m.	24	2 June 2025	1.28	10 July 2025	1.52	1.47
5	Mon–Thurs 10:30 p.m.	24	12 October 2026	0.98	19 November 2026	TBD	1.03

=== Awards and nominations ===
Year	Award	Category	Nominated	Result	Ref
2023	Produ Awards	Best Crime Series	Lotería del crimen	Nominated	
2023	Produ Awards	Best Superseries	Lotería del crimen	Nominated	
2024	Produ Awards	Best Crime Series	Lotería del crimen	Nominated	
2024	Produ Awards	Best Lead Actress - Action, Crime, Horror, Thriller Series or Miniseries	Sara Maldonado	Nominated	
2024	Produ Awards	Best Directing - Superseries or Telenovela	Carlos Carrera	Nominated	
2025	Produ Awards	Best Crime Series	Lotería del crimen	Nominated	
