= List of programs broadcast by Univision =

Univision 2019 logo

This is a list of television programs currently broadcast (in first-run or reruns), scheduled to be broadcast or formerly broadcast on Univision, a Spanish-language American broadcast television network.

== Current programming ==
Title	Premiere date / Notes	Ref.
Telenovelas
Mañana es para siempre (Note: Rerun)	March 9, 2026	
Corazón de oro	July 14, 2026	
Tierra de amor y coraje	September 7, 2026	
Sabor a ti	September 28, 2026	
Drama series
La rosa de Guadalupe	June 26, 2008	
Como dice el dicho	March 19, 2011	
Esta historia me suena	January 15, 2023	
Con esa misma mirada	September 29, 2025	
News/public affairs programming
Noticiero Univision	1986	
Primer Impacto	February 14, 1994	
¡Despierta América!	April 14, 1997	
El Gordo y la Flaca	September 21, 1998	
Noticiero Univision: Fin De Semana	2000	
Noticiero Univision: Edicion Nocturna	March 7, 2011	
Noticiero Univision: Edición Digital	September 12, 2016	
¡Siéntese quién pueda!	May 1, 2023	
Reality/non-scripted
Me caigo de risa	February 17, 2019	
¿Quién es la máscara?	August 2, 2020	
Juego de voces	April 7, 2024	
Cero ruido	April 14, 2024	
Cash: el peso del dinero	June 9, 2024	
Lo tomas o lo dejas	August 3, 2025	
¿Apostarías por mí?	January 18, 2026	
Talk shows
Desiguales	February 19, 2024	
Comedy programming
La familia P. Luche	August 19, 2012	
Nosotros los guapos	November 12, 2016	
Vecinos	August 14, 2017	
María de todos los Ángeles	August 19, 2017	
Los González	June 16, 2018	
Una familia de diez	September 14, 2019	
¿Tú crees?	August 14, 2022	
¿Es neta, Eva?	August 6, 2023	
Lalola	August 3, 2024	
El Chavo del Ocho	September 21, 2024	
El Chapulín Colorado	September 22, 2024	
Sports programming
Liga MX	1986	
CONCACAF Gold Cup	February 12, 2000	
Contacto Deportivo	March 2, 2015	
UEFA	August 15, 2018	
Choice Awards
Premios Lo Nuestro	May 31, 1989, broadcast annually in February of each year	
Premios Juventud	September 23, 2004, broadcast annually in July of each year	
Premios Latin Grammy	November 3, 2005, broadcast annually in November of each year	
Special programming
Desfile de las Rosas	1986, broadcast annually in January of each year	
El Grito de México	September 15, 2003, broadcast annually in September of each year	
Virgen de Guadalupe	1986, broadcast annually in December of each year	
Teleton USA	December 14, 2012, broadcast annually in March of each year	
¡Feliz!	December 31, 1986, broadcast annually in New Year's Eve of each year	
Children's programming
Planeta de niños	January 6, 2018	
Atención Atención	October 6, 2018	
Franklin and Friends	June 18, 2022	

== Upcoming programming ==
Title	Premiere date	Ref.
Gigantes con Don Francisco	October 11, 2026	

== Former programming ==
=== Original programming ===
==== Telenovelas ====
Title	Run
Amar a muerte	October 29, 2018 – March 11, 2019
El Dragón	September 30, 2019 – January 20, 2020
El Talismán	January 30, 2012 – June 15, 2012
Eva Luna	November 1, 2010 – April 11, 2011
Gata salvaje	May 28, 2002 – May 29, 2003
La bella y las bestias	June 12, 2018 – September 10, 2018
La Piloto	March 7, 2017 – October 18, 2018
Rebeca	June 2, 2003 – January 8, 2004

==== Drama series ====
Title	
Amas de Casa Desesperadas	January 10, 2008 – June 19, 2008
Descontrol	January 7, 2018 – February 4, 2018
El Chapo	April 23, 2017 – July 25, 2018
Jennifer Lopez Presents: Como Ama una Mujer	October 30, 2007 – November 27, 2007
La fuerza de creer	September 3, 2017 – September 10, 2017 (season 1) January 7, 2019 – January 11, 2019 (season 2)
Rubí	January 21, 2020 – February 27, 2020
Su Nombre Era Dolores	January 15, 2017 – April 9, 2017

==== News / public affairs programming ====
Title	Run
Al Punto	September 9, 2007 – December 15, 2024
Aquí y Ahora	March 30, 1998 – December 29, 2024
CDI: código de investigación	January 14, 2025 – September 28, 2025
Crónicas	January 23, 2016 – March 15, 2020
El show, crónica de un asesinato	August 4, 2024 – September 8, 2024
Notanserio Univision	February 26, 2017 – April 9, 2017
Primer Impacto Extra	1998 – September 20, 2019
Sal y pimienta	September 19, 2010 – February 12, 2017

==== Talk / reality shows ====
Title	Run
Don Francisco Presenta	October 10, 2001 – January 30, 2012
El retador	August 14 – October 2, 2022
El Show de Cristina	April 1989 – November 1, 2010
La Banda	September 13, 2015 – December 11, 2016
La gran sorpresa	January 14, 2018 – February 18, 2018
LAnzate	October 24, 2015 – December 16, 2017
Mi famoso y yo	March 19 – May 7, 2023
Mira Quien Baila	September 12, 2010 – November 19, 2023
Nuestra Belleza Latina	March 27, 2007 – November 21, 2021
Reina de la canción	April 17, 2017 – November 24, 2019
Los Archivos de Cristina	2001 – 2010
Protagonistas	October 12, 2011 – November 7, 2011
Quiero ser estrella	1997 – 1999
Q'Viva! The Chosen	January 28 – April 14, 2012
Tu cara me suena	October 4, 2020 – May 8, 2022
Va por ti	September 7, 2014 – September 3, 2016
Veo cómo cantas	August 6 – September 24, 2023
¡Viva la Familia!	2008 – 2012
¡Viva el Sueño!	August 30, 2009 – November 22, 2009

==== Music/variety shows ====
Title	Run
Bailando	February 10, 1990 – August 15, 1992
Control	March 19, 1994 – January 14, 2006
Caliente	April 8, 1995 – March 11, 2006
El Show de Paul Rodriguez	March 2, 1990 – January 1, 1993
Noche de Gigantes	September 18, 1991 – December 9, 1992
La Casa de Sus Sueños	November 22, 1987 – February 2, 1997
Pase VIP	July 30, 2017 – August 6, 2017
Sábado Gigante	April 12, 1986 – September 19, 2015
Clásicos de Sábado Gigante	March 31, 2002 – February 5, 2012
Serie de Conciertos de Verano de Despierta América	May 25, 2012 – July 20, 2012
Univisión In Studio	November 3, 2010 – 2012

==== Comedy programming ====
Title	Run
Estamos Unidos	December 1, 2000 – 2001
Lente Loco	1992 – 2001

==== Game shows ====
Title	Run
Dale Replay	February 17, 2017 – March 17, 2017
El Bla Blazo	1998 – 2000
Trato Hecho	January 10, 2005 – December 9, 2005

==== Sports programming ====
Title	Run
FIFA World Cup	1970 – 2014
FIFA Confederations Cup	2001 – 2013
Copa América	1993 – 2011, 2016, 2021, 2024
República Deportiva	April 11, 1999 – December 30, 2023

=== Acquired programming ===
==== Telenovelas ====
- A que no me dejas
- Abismo de pasión
- Acorralada
- Agujetas de color de rosa
- Al diablo con los guapos
- Alborada
- Alegrijes y rebujos
- Alma rebelde
- Alondra
- Amada enemiga
- Amanecer
- A.mar, donde el amor teje sus redes
- Amar otra vez
- Amar sin límites
- Amarte es mi pecado
- Amigas y rivales
- Amor amargo
- Amor bravío
- Amor Comprado
- Amor de barrio
- Amor dividido
- Amor eterno
- Amor Gitano
- Amor Real
- Amor sin maquillaje
- Amorcito Corazón
- Amores con trampa
- Amores verdaderos
- Amy, la niña de la mochila azul
- Ángel Rebelde
- Ángela
- Antes muerta que Lichita
- Apuesta por un amor
- Atrévete a Soñar
- Aventuras en el tiempo
- Bajo las riendas del amor
- Bajo la misma piel
- Bajo un mismo rostro
- Barrera de amor
- Bendita mentira
- Besos Robados
- Cabo
- Cachito de cielo
- Caer en tentación
- Camaleones
- Camila
- Cañaveral de Pasiones
- Canción de amor
- Carita de Ángel
- Carita Pintada
- Central de Abasto
- Cita a ciegas
- Clap, el lugar de tus sueños
- Clase 406
- Código Postal
- Como tú no hay 2
- Cómplices al rescate
- Confidente de secundaria
- Contigo sí
- Contra viento y marea
- Corazón apasionado
- Corazón guerrero
- Corazón Indomable
- Corazón que miente
- Corazón salvaje(1993)
- Corazón salvaje(2009)
- Corazones al limite
- Corona de Lágrimas
- Cosita Linda
- Cuando me enamoro
- Cuento de Navidad
- Cuidado con el angel
- De Que Te Quiero, Te Quiero
- Despertar contigo
- Destilando amor
- Diseñando tu amor
- DKDA: Sueños de juventud
- Doménica Montero
- Doña Flor y sus dos maridos
- Dos Hogares
- Duelo de Pasiones
- Dulce ambición
- El alma no tiene color
- El amor invencible
- El amor no tiene precio
- El amor no tiene receta
- El ángel de Aurora
- El color de la pasión
- El Diario de Daniela
- El hotel de los secretos
- El juego de la vida
- El Manantial
- El niño que vino del mar
- El noveno mandamiento
- El precio de amarte
- El premio mayor
- El Privilegio de Amar
- El Rico y Lázaro
- El vuelo de la victoria
- En nombre del amor
- En tierras salvajes
- Enamorada
- Enamorándome de Ramón
- Entre el amor y el odio
- Esperanza del corazón
- Eternamente amándonos
- Fuego en la sangre
- Fugitivas, en busca de la libertad
- Golpe de suerte
- Gotita de amor
- Guardián de mi vida
- Hasta el fin del mundo
- Hasta que el dinero nos separe
- Heridas de amor
- Hermanas, un amor compartido
- Hijas de la luna
- Huracán
- Imperio de mentiras
- Inocente de Ti
- Jesús
- Juegos de amor y poder
- Juro Que Te Amo
- Karsu, la fuerza de una madre
- La desalmada
- La doble vida de Estela Carrillo
- La Dueña
- La esposa virgen
- La fea más bella
- La fuerza del destino
- La Gata
- La herencia
- La hija del embajador
- Los hilos del pasado
- La historia de Juana
- La Intrusa
- La madrastra(2005 TV series)
- La madrastra(2022 TV series)
- La Malquerida
- La mexicana y el güero
- La mujer de mi vida
- La mujer del Vendaval
- La Otra
- La Pícara Soñadora
- La que no podía amar
- La reina soy yo
- La sombra del otro
- La sombra del pasado
- La Tierra Prometida
- La Tempestad
- La usurpadora
- La vecina
- La verdad oculta
- Las amazonas
- Las dos caras de Ana
- Las hijas de la señora García
- Las tontas no van al cielo
- Las vías del amor
- Like
- Llena de amor
- Llovizna
- Locura de amor
- Lo imperdonable
- Lo Que La Vida Me Robó
- Lola...Érase una vez
- Los ricos también lloran
- Luz Clarita
- Madre
- Mañana Es Para Siempre
- Mar de amor
- Marea de pasiones
- María Belén
- María Isabel
- María José
- María la del Barrio
- Maria Mercedes
- Mariana de la Noche
- Marido y Mujer
- Marimar
- Marisol
- Me declaro culpable
- Médicos
- Mentir para vivir
- Mi adorable maldición
- Mi camino es amarte
- Mi corazón es tuyo
- Mi Destino Eres Tú
- Mi fortuna es amarte
- Mi marido tiene familia
- Minas de pasión
- Mi pecado
- Mi pequeña traviesa
- Mi rival
- Miss XV
- Mi verdad oculta
- Mi vida eres tú
- Monteverde
- Muchacha italiana viene a casarse
- Muchachitas como tú
- Mujer
- Mujer bonita
- Mujer de madera
- Mujer de nadie
- Mujeres engañadas
- Mundo de Fieras
- Navidad sin fin
- Necesito una amiga
- Ni contigo ni sin ti
- Niña Amada Mía
- Niña de mi Corazón
- No me hallo
- Nunca te diré adiós
- Nunca te olvidaré
- Olvidarte jamás
- Palabra de Mujer
- Papá a toda madre
- Papás por conveniencia
- Papás por siempre
- Para Volver a amar
- Pasión y poder
- Pecadora
- Perdona nuestros pecados
- Peregrina
- Piel de otoño
- Pobre millonaria
- Por amar sin ley
- Por ella soy Eva
- Por siempre Joan Sebastián
- Por Siempre mi Amor
- Por tu amor
- Porque el Amor Manda
- Preciosa
- Primer amor, a mil por hora
- Prisionera de amor
- Qué bonito amor
- ¿Qué le pasa a mi familia?
- Qué pobres tan ricos
- Que te perdone Dios
- Quererlo todo
- Querida Enemiga
- Quiero Amarte
- Rafaela
- Ramona
- Rayito de luz
- Rebelde
- Rencor apasionado
- Ringo
- Rosalinda
- Rosario Tijeras
- Rubí
- Sabor a tí
- Sacrificio de mujer
- Salomé
- Samantha
- Sentimientos ajenos
- Ser bonita no basta
- Serafín
- Simplemente María
- Si nos dejan
- Sin ti
- Sin tu mirada
- Soltero con hijas
- Somos tú y yo
- Soñadoras
- Soñar no Cuesta Nada
- Sortilegio
- S.O.S me estoy enamorando
- Soy tu dueña
- Sueño de amor(2016)
- Tan cerca de ti, nace el amor
- Te acuerdas de mí
- Te doy la vida
- Te sigo amando
- Tenías que ser tú
- Teresa(1989)
- Teresa(2010)
- Tierra de esperanza
- Tormenta en el Paraiso
- Tres veces Ana
- Triunfo del amor
- Trópic
- Tu vida es mi vida
- Tú y yo
- Un gancho al corazón
- Una familia con suerte
- Una luz en el camino
- Un camino hacia el destino
- Un Refugio Para El Amor
- Valeria
- Velo de Novia
- Vencer el desamor
- Vencer el miedo
- Vencer el pasado
- Vencer la ausencia
- Vencer la culpa
- Verano de Amor
- Vino el amor
- ¡Vivan los Niños!
- Vivir de amor
- Vivo por Elena
- Y mañana será otro día
- Yo amo a Juan Querendon
- Yo no creo en los hombres
- Zacatillo, un lugar en tu corazón

==== Drama series ====
Title	Run
Cuna de lobos	October 21, 2019 - November 26, 2019
El corazón nunca se equivoca	August 13, 2019 - September 9, 2019
El extraño retorno de Diana Salazar	January 19, 2025 – March 16, 2025
El gallo de oro	May 8, 2024 – June 3, 2024
El último rey	May 17, 2022 - June 27, 2022
Esta historia me suena	July 13, 2019 - August 11, 2019
Gloria Trevi: Ellas soy yo	July 31, 2024 - August 20, 2024
Hoy voy a cambiar	September 11, 2017 - October 10, 2017
José de Egipto	June 19, 2017 - August 7, 2017
La usurpadora	September 16, 2019 - October 18, 2019
Los milagros de Jesús	June 4, 2017 - July 23, 2017
Mujeres Asesinas	2009 - 2011
Pedro el escamoso: más escamoso que nunca	September 18 - October 21, 2024
Narcos	August 22, 2016 - September 2, 2016
Rey David	December 11, 2017 - January 12, 2018
Silvia Pinal, frente a ti	May 27, 2019 - June 17, 2019
Sin miedo a la verdad	July 30, 2019 - April 24, 2020

==== News / public affairs programming ====
Title	Run
Duro Y Directo	1997-1999
Tras la verdad	2001–2015

==== Comedy programming ====
Title	Run
Albertano contra los mostros	2022
Alma de ángel	November 9, 2019 – January 4, 2020
Corazón contento	February 6, 2021 – March 27, 2021
De noche pero sin sueño	October 9, 2022 – June 16, 2024
Desmadruga2	2013 – 2017
Dr. Cándido Pérez	2021
Durmiendo con mi Jefe	December 2014 – August 13, 2017
El Privilegio de Mandar	March 3, 2018 – June 30, 2018
Estrella2	2013 – 2017
Festival internacional del humor	July 30, 2017 – August 13, 2017
Hotel Todo Incluido	July 5, 2014 – August 11, 2017
Los González	November 12, 2016 – June 3, 2017
Me caigo de risa	September 9, 2018 – September 30, 2018
Mi lista de exes	February 9, 2019 – March 2, 2019
Mi querida herencia	September 21, 2019 – 2021
Perdiendo el juicio	2022
Renta congelada	March 3, 2018 – 2024
Según Bibi	July 28, 2018 – September 1, 2018
Se rentan cuartos	2021

==== Talk / reality shows ====
Title	Run
Al final todo queda en familia	May 6, 2018 – July 8, 2018
Cuentamelo ya!... al fin	July 28, 2018 - 2024
Doble sentido	March 17, 2018 – February 2, 2019
El Gran Show de los Peques	April 21, 2012 – May 19, 2012
Familias frente al fuego	July 21, 2019 – August 4, 2019
Hoy	September 10, 2012 – June 13, 2018; May 28, 2019 – March 22, 2024
¿Quién Tiene la Razón?	November 17, 2008 – August 25, 2011
Clásicos de ¿Quién Tiene la Razón?	November 2008 – August 29, 2011
Me pongo de pie	May 3, 2015 – July 5, 2015
Netas divinas	October 3, 2015 – March 11, 2018
+ Noche	February 9, 2019 – 2023
Pequeños Gigantes	March 27, 2011 – April 5, 2020
Tu Día Alegre	2001 – 2015

==== Children's programming ====
Title	Run
El mundo de Beakman	2008–2010
Bill el cientifico	2007–2008
Calimero	October 14, 2017 – September 29, 2018
Olly, el submarino	2010–2011
¿Donde en el mundo esta Carmen Sandiego?	2007–2008
Dora, la exploradora	2008–2014
El Chavo Animado	January 6, 2013 – June 10, 2018
Giorgiomania	1990s
Go, Diego, Go!	2009–2014
Handy Manny	May 31, 2014 – May 26, 2018
Los Viajes de Inspector Gadget	2008-2010
Jakers! Las Aventuras de Piggley Winks	2008-2011
La Piñata Loca	1990s
Los Backyardigans	2011–2015
Los Pequeños Picapiedra	1990s
Maya y Miguel	2011–2013
Mickey Mouse Clubhouse	May 31, 2014 – May 26, 2018
Naturaleza humana	June 2, 2018 – May 28, 2022
Pinky Dinky Doo	2007–2011
Plaza Sésamo	April 3, 1995 – September 9, 2001
Pocoyo	2010–December 30, 2017
Sesame Amigos	August 1, 2015 – October 7, 2017
The Jungle Book	2013–2014
Yogi Bear	1990s
Zigby	2010–2013

==== Game shows ====
Title	Run
El juego de las estrellas	July 31, 2016 – 2017
Recuerda y gana	July 31, 2016 – 2018
100 mexicanos dijieron	July 30, 2017 – 2018

==== Music / variety shows ====
Title	Run
Aurora Valle Presenta...	2010–2012
Nuestra Navidad	December 10, 2006 – December 11, 2011
The Johnny Canales Show	1988–1996; moved to Telemundo in 1996
La vida es mejor cantando	January 15-January 29, 2012
México Suena	2011
Tú Música	1988-1991

==== Pro-wrestling ====
Title	Run
WWF Super Astros	1998-1999
