= List of programs broadcast by UniMás =

UniMas logo

This is a list of television programs currently broadcast (in first-run or reruns), scheduled to be broadcast or formerly broadcast on UniMás (formerly known as TeleFutura), a Spanish-language American broadcast television network owned by Univision.

== Current programming ==
Title	Premiere date	Ref.
Telenovelas
La dueña	July 20, 2026	
La mentira (Note: Rerun)	July 20, 2026	
Qué bonito amor	July 20, 2026	
Amigos x siempre	October 26, 2026	
Corazón salvaje	October 26, 2026	
Fugitivas, en busca de la libertad	October 27, 2026	
Drama series
Como dice el dicho	July 5, 2016	
La encrucijada	October 26, 2026	
Talk/reality shows
Veredicto final	September 17, 2007	
¿Quién caerá?	January 8, 2024	
Lo tomas o lo dejas	March 31, 2025	
Piensa rápido	August 18, 2025	
¿Apostarías por mí?	January 18, 2026	
¿Quién caerá? Kids	January 26, 2026	
Garra vs. Veneno: Guerreros Mundiales	June 2, 2026	
Primeras citas	October 26, 2026	
Comedy
El Chavo del Ocho	September 23, 2024	
El Chapulín Colorado	September 24, 2024	
La CQ: nuevo ingreso	February 16, 2025	
News programming
C.D.I.: Código de Investigación	January 5, 2026	
Sports
Liga MX	2002	
UEFA	2018	
MLB En Vivo	August 20, 2024	
Choice Awards
Latin American Music Awards	April 21, 2023	
MTV Video Music Awards	September 12, 2023	
Children's programming
El mundo es tuyo	May 7, 2018	
Ranger Rob	October 2, 2022	
El que sabe sabe	December 1, 2024	

== Former programming ==
=== Original programming ===
==== Telenovelas ====
Title	Run	Ref
Gata salvaje	November 22, 2010 – November 16, 2011	
¿Quién Eres Tú?	January 7 – January 18, 2013	
La Madame	August 26 – October 31, 2013	
La viuda negra	February 23 – June 8, 2014 (season 1); February 28 – May 22, 2016 (season 2); October 31, 2016 – February 13, 2017 (season 1, rerun); March 18 – June 20, 2024 (season 1, rerun)	
Metástasis	June 8 – September 18, 2014	
El Chivo	September 23 – December 31, 2014	
La esquina del diablo	January 13 – April 26, 2015	
Cosita Linda	October 27, 2014 – May 1, 2015	
Ruta 35	January 12 – February 26, 2016	

==== Talk/reality shows ====
Title	Run	Ref
El conquistador	October 27 - December 15, 2025	
El túnel del amor	October 26 - November 13, 2026	
El Palenque de Enrique Santos	August 11, 2014 - November 6, 2015	
El Veredicto del Pueblo	2004 - 2005	
Enamorándonos	September 8, 2019 - June 13, 2025	
En Busca de Un Sueño	2004 - 2005	
Escandalo TV	January 15, 2002 - October 7, 2011	
Escandalo TV Extra	2006 - October 9, 2011	
La Gran Fiesta	2004 - 2005	
La gran sorpresa	January 11, 2019 - February 19, 2019	
La Revista de Zuleyka	July 27, 2015 - November 6, 2015	
La Tijera	March 2, 2009 - October 7, 2011	
Mira quién baila	August 1, 2018 - August 8, 2018	
Monica	January 14, 2002 - 2010	
Noche de Perros: Solo Para Hombres	October 31, 2011 - April 20, 2012	
Objetivo Fama	2004 - 2009	
Protagonistas	November 8, 2011 - December 16, 2011	
Roxanna	August 24, 2015 - November 6, 2015	
Sal y Pimienta	February 23, 2016 - July 7, 2016	
¡Siéntese quién pueda!	August 22, 2022 - May 19, 2023	
Tómbola	October 10, 2011 - January 17, 2012	
Tombola Extra	October 16, 2011 - January 15, 2012	
Tu Día Alegre	August 11, 2014 - April 10, 2015	

==== News/public affairs programming ====
Title	Run	Ref
En Vivo y Directo	October 17, 2005 - April 2006	
Noticiero Univision: Edicion Nocturna	May 13, 2019 - September 11, 2020	

==== Sports programming ====
Title	Run	Ref
Contacto Deportivo	January 14, 2002 - March 8, 2015; August 21, 2017 - June 22, 2018; July 16, 2018 - August 9, 2019	
República Mundialista	June 14, 2018 - July 13, 2018	
Zona NBA	May 3, 2015 - 2017	

==== Game shows ====
Title	Run
Aprieta y Gana	2004 - 2006
¿Qué dice la gente?	June 12, 2006 - November 14, 2008

==== Music programming ====
Title	Run	Ref
Pepsi Música	April 24, 2004 - 2010	

=== Acquired programming ===
==== Telenovelas ====
Title	Run	Ref
A calzón quita'o	July 28, 2003 - February 20, 2004	
Abismo de pasión	September 7, 2017 - January 8, 2018; October 23, 2023 - June 14, 2024	
Abrázame muy fuerte	September 29, 2008 - April 14, 2009, first-run; January 7 - April 10, 2013, rerun; February 7 - May 27, 2024, rerun	
Acorralada	November 17, 2011 - April 27, 2012	
Agujetas de color de rosa	June 30, 2003 - September 3, 2004	
Al diablo con los guapos	February 1 - October 12, 2010; October 13, 2025 - March 13, 2026	
Alborada	May 31 - October 5, 2011; September 23 - December 31, 2020	
Alcanzar una estrella	July 23 - October 24, 2025	
Alegrijes y Rebujos	April 5 - October 26, 2004	
Alguna vez tendremos alas	March 2 - September 2, 2005	
Alma de Hierro	September 23, 2008 - September 28, 2009	
Alma Rebelde	October 28, 2002 - March 7, 2003, first-run; December 3, 2012 - February 7, 2013, rerun	
Amar a muerte	January 17 - May 19, 2022	
Amar otra vez	May 30 - November 1, 2007	
Amarte es mi Pecado	March 25 - August 7, 2009	
Amigas y rivales	August 1, 2007 - April 22, 2008, first-run; April 29 - September 13, 2013, rerun; April 27, 2020 - January 25, 2021, rerun	
Amigos x Siempre	November 1, 2010 - April 8, 2011	
Amor a palos	May 1, 2006 - January 30, 2007	
Amor bravío	June 30, 2021 - October 28, 2021	
Amor de mis Amores	June 5 - October 26, 2005, first-run; October 26, 2009 - June 29, 2010, rerun	
Amor Gitano	April 1 - June 17, 2009	
Amor prohibido	September 11, 2023 – November 29, 2024	
Amor real	January 18 - May 14, 2010; May 13 - October 29, 2024	
Amor sin maquillaje	September 2 - October 6, 2009	
Amorcito corazón	October 9, 2023 - March 22, 2024	
Amores con trampa	March 14, 2022 - June 23, 2022	
Amores verdaderos	March 23 - December 29, 2020	
Amy, la niña de la mochila azul	October 27, 2004 - April 11, 2005	
Ángela	September 18, 2006 - January 8, 2007	
Antes muerta que Lichita	February 4 - August 8, 2019	
Apocalipsis	August 12 - December 27, 2019	
Apuesta por un amor	October 21, 2008 - February 27, 2009; September 11, 2023 - January 5, 2024	
Así es la vida	July 24, 2006 - May 23, 2008, first-run 2010, rerun	
Atrapada	January 21 - April 23, 2019	
Azul	January 7, 2007 - February 3, 2008	
Bajo la misma piel	June 12 - October 22, 2008; March 12 - July 22, 2025	
Bajo las Riendas del Amor	September 10 - December 21, 2012	
Barrera de amor	June 8 - December 11, 2009	
Bendita mentira	October 3, 2005 - February 10, 2006	
Bloque de búsqueda	October 17, 2016 - January 13, 2017	
Betty, la Fea	October 7, 2002 - May 23, 2003, first-run February 9 - November 25, 2009, rerun	
Caer en tentación	July 3 - December 23, 2024	
Cambio de piel	January 15 - July 8, 2002	
Camila	May 18 - October 23, 2005, first-run; April 4 - August 13, 2007, rerun; April 11 - June 20, 2013, rerun	
Cañaveral de Pasiones	March 10 - July 17, 2008, first-run; November 12, 2025 - March 26, 2026, rerun	
Carita de Ángel	March 18, 2006 - December 15, 2007, first-run; June 14, 2012 - February 28, 2013, rerun; February 1 - October 1, 2021, rerun; May 5 - August 28, 2026, rerun	
Carita Pintada	January 15 - September 13, 2002	
Carrusel	March 18 - December 6, 2002	
Clase 406	December 21, 2007 - May 22, 2011; May 1, 2024 - March 11, 2025	
Como tú no hay 2	October 28, 2024 - March 28, 2025	
Cómplices Al Rescate	September 16, 2002 - March 27, 2003, first-run; October 4, 2021 - April 5, 2022, rerun	
Contra viento y marea	December 16, 2020 - March 24, 2021	
Corazón indomable	June 3 - October 18, 2024	
Corona de lágrimas	February 7 - April 28, 2020; December 16, 2024 - March 31, 2025	
Correo de inocentes	September 22 - December 30, 2011	
Cuando llega el amor	July 31 - October 4, 2024	
Cuando me enamoro	January 8 - June 7, 2024	
Cuento de Navidad	December 24, 2012 - January 4, 2013	
Cuidado con el ángel	April 22 - September 26, 2025	
Cuna de lobos	December 9, 2021 - January 14, 2022	
De pocas, pocas pulgas	November 10, 2003 - April 1, 2004	
Desencuentro	November 8, 2004 - March 1, 2005	
Despertar contigo	June 3 - August 26, 2019	
Destilando Amor	July 27, 2009 - January 14, 2010 May 1 - September 6, 2017 January 4 - May 31, 2021	
DKDA: Sueños de juventud	March 29 - September 8, 2004	
Doña Bella	April 25 - September 19, 2011	
Duelo de Pasiones	May 17 - November 18, 2010	
El juego de la vida	October 10, 2012 - May 31, 2013	
El abuelo y yo	May 3, 2003 - January 29, 2005	
El Bienamado	May 2 - September 21, 2017	
El capo	February 1 - June 2, 2010, first-run December 19, 2011 - May 10, 2012, rerun	
El Cartel de los Sapos	April 27 - June 10, 2015	
El color de la pasión	March 31 - October 25, 2021; August 5 - November 11, 2025	
El derecho de nacer	August 31 - December 23, 2005, first-run February 26 - June 11, 2008, July 12 - September 6, 2012, reruns	
El Diario de Daniela	April 2, 2005 - March 12, 2006	
El hotel de los secretos	September 11, 2019 - January 13, 2020	
El Inútil	January 15 - September 13, 2002	
El Manantial	August 14 - December 27, 2007	
El niño que vino del mar	August 1, 2004 - October 2, 2005, first-run August 5 - December 6, 2013, rerun	
El noveno mandamiento	June 24 - August 16, 2013	
El precio de tu amor	May 15 - October 3, 2006	
El Precio del Silencio	April 28 - October 17, 2008	
El Privilegio de Amar	November 17, 2008 - June 26, 2009, first run; September 16, 2013 - January 10, 2014, rerun; October 16, 2023 - February 20, 2024, rerun	
El Ultimo Matrimonio Feliz	August 8, 2011 - February 3, 2012	
Enamorándome de Ramón	January 9 - April 14, 2023	
En la boca del lobo	November 10, 2014 - January 9, 2015	
En tierras salvajes	December 18, 2019 - February 6, 2020	
Entre dos amores	October 17, 2018 - May 10, 2019	
Entre el amor y el odio	January 2 - June 30, 2006, first-run August 19 - November 14, 2013; April 5 - June 29, 2021, reruns	
Esmeralda	March 18 - September 2002, first-run November 30, 2009 - June 7, 2010, rerun	
Estrambótica Anastasia	January 31 - August 24, 2007	
Fuego en la sangre	October 13, 2010 - July 26, 2011, first-run; December 9, 2013 - June 27, 2014, rerun; August 4, 2021 - January 28, 2022, rerun	
Fugitivos	April 6 - June 10, 2015	
Gotita de amor	July 8 - October 25, 2002, first-run; February 13 - June 13, 2012, rerun; August 24 - October 23, 2026, rerun	
Hasta el fin del mundo	January 9 - May 25, 2018	
Hasta que el dinero nos separe	October 5, 2015 - March 17, 2016, first-run; November 11, 2020 - December 22, 2021, rerun	
Hasta que la plata nos separe	July 23, 2007 - March 14, 2008, first-run July 27, 2011 - March 9, 2012, rerun	
Heridas de amor	March 18 - September 24, 2010	
Huérfanos de su tierra	July 26 - December 2, 2021	
India, una historia de amor	October 5, 2010 - April 25, 2011	
Inocente de Ti	August 26 - December 9, 2008	
Infieles anónimos	January 15 - September 5, 2008	
Infierno en el paraíso	October 3, 2006 - February 8, 2007	
Isabella, Mujer Enamorada	January 15 - August 19, 2002	
Jesús	May 13 - August 12, 2019	
Juana la virgen	April 20 - November 23, 2005	
La bella y las bestias	September 28, 2020 - January 15, 2021	
La candidata	May 29 - September 8, 2017	
La casa en la playa	July 21 - October 20, 2008	
La Consentida	June 6 - October 14, 2005	
La costeña y el cachaco	July 28, 2003 - February 20, 2004, first-run October 20, 2008 - 2009, rerun	
La Cuaima	December 13, 2004 - June 14, 2005	
La Dama de Troya	June 2 - October 24, 2008, first-run October 8, 2009 - April 23, 2010, rerun	
La doble vida de Estela Carrillo	December 30, 2020 - March 30, 2021	
La esposa virgen	December 14, 2009 - March 17, 2010	
La fea más bella	May 23, 2022 - August 14, 2023	
La fuerza del destino	January 26 - April 26, 2022	
La Gata	October 7, 2024 - January 14, 2025	
La herencia	July 20 - November 13, 2026	
La hija del embajador	May 2 - July 22, 2022	
La hija del mariachi	April 9 - October 18, 2007, first-run December 10, 2008 - March 24, 2009, August 15, 2011 - March 2, 2012, reruns	
La Invasora	August 27, 2007 - February 25, 2008	
La jefa del campeón	July 10 - October 10, 2018	
La Madrastra	April 15 - October 12, 2009; June 26 - September 8, 2023	
La malquerida	May 28 - August 24, 2018	
La Marca del Deseo	March 24 - September 22, 2008, first-run August 10, 2009 - January 7, 2010, rerun	
La Mentira	June 8 - October 27, 2004, first-run January 16 - June 2, 2012, rerun	
La mujer de Judas	June 14 - December 10, 2004	
La mujer de mi vida	September 27, 2010 - April 28, 2011	
La Niña	December 4, 2017 - April 6, 2018	
La Otra	September 26, 2005 - January 27, 2006, first-run; November 22, 2010 - March 29, 2011, rerun	
La Pola	May 2 - September 22, 2011	
La que no podía amar	April 29 - August 21, 2020; April 1 - August 8, 2025	
La reina del flow	April 26 - August 27, 2021	
La ronca de oro	June 27 - October 3, 2016	
La Selección	August 5 - November 1, 2013	
La Tempestad	June 4 - August 31, 2018	
La Tierra Prometida	September 11, 2017 - May 21, 2018, first-run October 1, 2018 - January 21, 2019, rerun	
La usurpadora (1998 TV series)	April 28 - September 25, 2008, first-run April 30 - July 11, 2012, May 31 - August 3, 2021; reruns	
La vecina	April 13 - September 22, 2020	
La viuda de la mafia	June 14, 2007 - January 14, 2008 first run April 27, 2009 - April 12, 2010 rerun	
La viuda joven	May 31 - December 20, 2011	
Laberintos de pasión	October 28, 2004 - February 21, 2005	
Lady, la vendedora de rosas	January 26 - May 15, 2016; September 25, 2017 - January 22, 2018	
Las amazonas	April 18 - May 31, 2019; October 14 - December 19, 2024	
Las mil y una noches	September 13, 2021 - April 28, 2022	
Las muñecas de la mafia	May 3 - July 12, 2010 first run April 23 - July 16, 2012, August 11 - October 31, 2014, reruns	
Las tontas no van al cielo	September 19, 2011 - March 16, 2012; March 25 - July 22, 2024	
Las vías del amor	July 5, 2006 - May 14, 2007, first-run; November 18, 2013 - April 25, 2014, rerun	
Lazos de Amor	May 15 - October 11, 2007, first-run; March 30 - June 19, 2026, rerun	
Locura de amor	December 6, 2004 - May 17, 2005, first-run; April 30 - October 9, 2012, rerun	
Lo imperdonable	August 27 - December 28, 2018; May 29 - August 25, 2023	
Lo que la vida me robó	February 14 - July 1, 2022	
Love Divina	June 19 - September 18, 2017	
Luz Clarita	March 18 - July 5, 2002; February 2 - May 4, 2026	
Made in Cartagena	January 7 - April 4, 2013	
Mañana es para siempre	January 24 - September 7, 2011, first-run; January 9 - April 28, 2017, rerun; November 8, 2022 - March 13, 2023	
María Belén	March 18 - May 31, 2002, first-run October 8, 2005 - December 17, 2006, rerun	
María Isabel	January 2 - March 29, 2007, first-run April 2 - May 14, 2012, rerun	
María la del Barrio	April 24 - September 6, 2006, first-run March 4 - August 2, 2013, rerun	
María Mercedes	October 7, 2002 - February 28, 2003, first-run; September 8, 2011 - January 2, 2012, rerun; January 4 - March 10, 2023, rerun	
Mariana de la Noche	November 17, 2010 - May 27, 2011, first-run; August 24 - December 15, 2020, rerun	
Marimar	September 7 - December 21, 2006, first-run; January 3 - March 30, 2012, rerun	
Mariú	January 15 - July 5, 2002	
Médicos, línea de vida	March 23 - June 5, 2026	
Merlina, mujer divina	January 2 – July 19, 2007, first-run; March 24 – June 18, 2010, rerun	
Mi corazón es tuyo	June 20 - November 28, 2016, first-run; January 23 - November 10, 2020, rerun; July 17 – December 27, 2024, rerun	
Mi Destino Eres Tú	May 3 - September 14, 2006	
Mi gorda bella	July 19, 2004 - March 29, 2005	
Milagros de amor	February 23 - June 29, 2004, first-run; June 18 - October 23, 2009, rerun	
Mi marido tiene familia	December 27, 2021 - May 20, 2022	
Minas de pasión	November 24, 2025 - April 28, 2026	
Mi pecado	March 30 - August 29, 2011	
Mi pequeña traviesa	March 18 - August 16, 2002	
Mi prima Ciela	March 17 - October 24, 2008	
Misión S.O.S	April 12 – October 11, 2005, first-run; May 28, 2011 - July 1, 2012, rerun	
Mis 3 hermanas	July 8 - October 7, 2002	
Miss XV	November 24, 2025 - June 3, 2026	
Moisés y los diez mandamientos	July 11, 2016 - June 12, 2017	
Morelia	June 23, 2003 - June 7, 2004	
Muchacha italiana viene a casarse	December 30, 2024 - April 25, 2025	
Mujer con pantalones	December 11, 2006 - June 13, 2007	
Mujer de Madera	November 5, 2007 - August 25, 2008	
Mujer secreta	January 15 - May 31, 2002	
Mujeres de negro	February 14 - April 21, 2017	
Mujeres Engañadas	February 12 - July 31, 2007	
Mundo de Fieras	October 13, 2010 - March 29, 2011	
Nadie como tú	March 25 - October 21, 2024	
Niña Amada Mía	October 4, 2010 - January 18, 2011, first-run; March 13 - May 31, 2023, rerun	
Nuevo rico, nuevo pobre (2007)	February 22 - October 18, 2016	
Nuevo rico, nuevo pobre (2025)	July 20 - October 23, 2026	
Nunca te olvidaré	September 20 - November 29, 2012	
Pablo Escobar, el patrón del mal	October 20, 2014 - January 12, 2015; June 18 - October 4, 2024	
Pablo y Andrea	April 20 - September 11, 2006	
Pájaro soñador	October 27, 2020 - June 16, 2021, first-run; June 21 - November 8, 2022, rerun	
Papá a toda madre	October 17, 2022 - January 13, 2023	
Pasión	January 13 - March 20, 2014; May 28 - August 6, 2024	
Pasión y poder	September 9, 2019 - March 11, 2020	
Pecado original	January 6 - June 13, 2025 (seasons 1-2)	
Peregrina	October 15, 2007 - March 6, 2008	
Piel de otoño	June 29 - November 3, 2009; July 4 - August 19, 2022	
Por Amor	September 12, 2006 - April 6, 2007, first-run; March 3, 2008 - September 2008, rerun	
Por ella soy Eva	January 4 - May 30, 2016, first-run; December 5, 2018 - May 7, 2019, rerun; August 16, 2023 - March 4, 2024, rerun	
Por siempre Joan Sebastian	February 13 - March 7, 2017, first-run; March 27 - April 23, 2019, rerun	
Por un beso	January 2 - May 19, 2008, first-run; February 11 - April 25, 2013, rerun	
Porque el amor manda	June 18 - December 4, 2018; October 11, 2021 - March 9, 2022	
Preciosa	November 17, 2003 - March 26, 2004	
Primer amor, a mil por hora	February 21 - April 30, 2024	
Pueblo Chico, Infierno Grande	July 15 - November 5, 2004	
Pura sangre	October 22, 2007 - March 20, 2008, first-run January 11 - March 23, 2010, rerun	
¡Qué buena se puso Lola!	October 27, 2005 - May 11, 2006	
¡Qué clase de amor!	January 7 - April 16, 2012	
¿Qué culpa tiene Fatmagül?	March 23 - October 26, 2020, first-run; November 1, 2021 - February 11, 2022, rerun	
Qué pobres tan ricos	November 29, 2016 - July 10, 2017, first-run; May 8, 2019 - January 22, 2020, rerun	
Que te perdone Dios	July 19 - November 7, 2022	
Querida Enemiga	June 8 - November 16, 2010	
Ramona	February 13 - May 12, 2006	
Rayito de luz	December 9, 2002 - January 10, 2003, first-run; December 10, 2008 - January 2, 2009, rerun	
Rebelde	January 6, 2014 - June 30, 2015, first-run; November 8, 2022 - October 16, 2023, rerun	
Rencor apasionado	January 11 - April 4, 2006	
Reto de Mujer	August 15, 2011 - February 17, 2012	
Rosa Salvaje	January 9 - May 29, 2007	
Rosalinda	January 30 - May 2, 2006, first-run; May 20 - August 29, 2008, rerun; August 22 - October 13, 2023, rerun	
Rosario Tijeras (Colombian TV series)	July 12 - October 4, 2010, first-run; January 21 - May 7, 2013, rerun	
Rosario Tijeras (Mexican TV series)	July 31 - September 24, 2017 season 1; November 26, 2018 - January 7, 2019, season 1 rerun; January 7 - April 11, 2019, season 2; October 27 - December 15, 2025, season 4	
Rubí	April 26 - October 12, 2010; April 26 - July 18, 2022	
Salomé	February 22 - August 30, 2005; March 18 - July 1, 2025	
Salvador de Mujeres	April 4 - August 12, 2011	
Se solicita príncipe azul	August 30, 2011 - March 1, 2012	
Sentimientos Ajenos	September 13 - December 3, 2004	
Si nos dejan	January 6, 2025 – April 28, 2025	
Sin pecado concebido	September 6, 2005 - January 10, 2006, first-run; October 20, 2008 - February 20, 2009, rerun; January 7 - March 21, 2025	
Simplemente María	April 5 - September 8, 2023	
Sobrevivir a ti	March 2 - June 5, 2026	
Soltero con hijas	March 31 - August 28, 2025	
Somos tu y yo	May 31 - December 24, 2011	
Soñadoras	March 10 - November 14, 2003, first-run; May 15 - September 19, 2012, rerun; October 16, 2023 - February 20, 2024, rerun	
Sortilegio	March 21 - May 20, 2016 April 20 - June 22, 2020	
Soy Luna	February 20 - June 15, 2018	
Soy tu Dueña	May 23 - September 6, 2016; February 28 - June 23, 2023	
Sueño de amor	September 1, 2025 - March 30, 2026	
Sueños y Caramelos	October 12, 2005 - April 19, 2006	
Te doy la vida	January 20 - June 5, 2026	
Teresa	May 23 - October 7, 2022	
Te sigo amando	February 23 - July 2, 2004	
Tiro de gracia	January 13 - April 2, 2015, first run October 19, 2016 - January 6, 2017, January 2 - March 20, 2019, reruns	
Todos Quieren con Marilyn	October 17, 2005 - May 3, 2006, first-run; April 13 - October 29, 2010, rerun	
Totalmente Diva	June 13 - November 28, 2017	
Trapos Íntimos	October 18, 2004 - June 2, 2005	
Tres Milagros (Colombian TV series)	July 18 - October 4, 2012	
Tres Milagros (Mexican TV series)	January 21 - April 23, 2019; August 31 - December 20, 2021	
Tres mujeres	August 23, 2004 - September 9, 2005, first-run December 27, 2010 - January 13, 2012, rerun	
Tres veces Ana	October 10, 2022 - April 3, 2023	
Triunfo del amor	September 7, 2016 - January 6, 2017; August 22, 2022 - January 10, 2023	
Tú y yo	July 1 - November 12, 2025	
Un camino hacia el destino	August 27 - December 17, 2019	
Un gancho al corazón	April 17 - October 12, 2023	
Un sueño llamado Salsa	September 20, 2010 - February 3, 2011	
Una familia con suerte	February 2 - October 2, 2015	
Una luz en el camino	January 13 - May 9, 2003	
Vecinos	September 28, 2009 - April 30, 2010, first-run June 18, 2015 - February 19, 2016, rerun	
Velo de novia	June 8 - October 1, 2010	
Vencer la culpa	April 30 - October 1, 2025	
Viva la Pepa	March 3 - July 25, 2003	
¡Vivan los Niños!	March 31 - November 7, 2003, first-run; October 27, 2008 - June 5, 2009, rerun; March 3 - October 17, 2014, rerun; April 6 - November 8, 2022, rerun	
Vivo por Elena	October 23, 2008 - March 31, 2009	
Yago	June 27 - September 5, 2016	
Yo amo a Juan Querendón	March 25 - November 27, 2009	
Yo no creo en los hombres	January 22 - April 17, 2019; November 12, 2025 - March 20, 2026	

==== Drama series ====
Title	Run	Ref.
¡Ay Güey!	July 16, 2018 - December 16, 2018	
Blue Demon	January 15, 2017 - February 10, 2017 (season 1); March 8, 2017 - April 5, 2017 (season 2); April 6, 2017 - July 15, 2017 (season 3); July 1, 2019 - September 10, 2019, rerun	
Cloroformo	August 6, 2013 - August 24, 2013	
Club de Cuervos	September 18, 2016 - December 18, 2016	
Contrato de corazones, tú y yo	October 27 - November 20, 2025	
Dani Who?	December 21 - December 25, 2020; January 24 - February 6, 2023	
Descontrol	January 23, 2018 - January 26, 2018	
Dogma	May 4, 2018 - May 18, 2018; July 20, 2018 - July 27, 2018	
Drug Wars	December 31, 2017 - August 26, 2018	
El Pantera	November 3, 2014 - January 9, 2015	
El Príncipe	July 19, 2016 - October 14, 2016; April 12, 2018 - June 13, 2018	
El ventilador	February 23, 2015 - April 9, 2015	
Érase una vez	July 20, 2018 - December 29, 2018	
Goblin: El Guardian	July 9 - August 13, 2025	
Gossip Girl Acapulco	September 20, 2013 - November 15, 2013	
Hermanos y detectives	April 13, 2015 - May 1, 2015, first-run; July 6, 2015 - July 24, 2015, rerun	
Hoy voy a cambiar	April 24, 2019 - May 24, 2019	
Jesus de Nazareth	April 14, 2017 - April 16, 2017	
José de Egipto	October 1, 2018 - November 19, 2018	
La Biblia	December 21 - December 25, 2020 March 29 - April 2, 2021	
La Bruja	January 12, 2015 - February 19, 2015	
La Embajada	August 21, 2016 - December 4, 2016 October 8, 2018 - November 2, 2018	
La Hermandad	March 5, 2017 - June 11, 2017 November 5, 2018 - November 23, 2018	
La reina Ester	April 6 - April 10, 2020	
La rosa de Guadalupe	January 4 - July 22, 2016	
La usurpadora (2019 TV series)	November 3 - December 8, 2021	
Los Héroes del Norte	April 8 - June 13, 2013	
Los Mosqueteros	May 6, 2017 - June 18, 2018	
Margarita	August 11 - October 6, 2025	
Morir en martes	July 30, 2019 - August 8, 2019	
Mujer, Casos de la Vida Real	July 23, 2012 - January 3, 2014 January 4, 2016 - January 2, 2019	
Niño Santo	September 20, 2015 - November 8, 2015	
Outpost	March 26, 2017 - June 11, 2017	
Paraíso blanco	September 17 - October 24, 2025	
Pedro el escamoso: más escamoso que nunca	February 25 - March 28, 2025	
Real America With Jorge Ramos	July 22, 2018 - August 26, 2018	
Rey David	November 20, 2018 - January 4, 2019	
Sansón y Dalila	May 22, 2018 - June 13, 2018, first-run January 7, 2019 - January 30, 2019, rerun	
Sincronía	May 4, 2018 - May 18, 2018	
Sin miedo a la verdad	June 22 - October 26, 2026	
Sin Ellas No Hay Paraíso	May 8, 2013 - June 13, 2013	
Velvet	October 4, 2016 - December 17, 2016 August 27, 2018 - October 5, 2018	
W: Dos mundos	August 13 - September 15, 2025	

==== Talk/reality/variety shows ====
Title	Run
Are You the One? El Match Perfecto	August 25 - September 12, 2025
Casos de Familia	June 3, 2012 - January 30, 2015
¿Cual es el bueno?	July 17 - August 10, 2023
Delicioso	September 11, 2010 - 2012
Desafío	January 4, 2021 - August 17, 2023
Desmadruga2	June 13, 2014 - July 14, 2014
El Inframundo	July 21, 2021 - August 10, 2021
Faisy Nights	August 17, 2021 - 2024
Guerreros	June 29, 2020 - September 24, 2020
Hotel VIP	August 21 – October 23, 2023
Hoy	July 30, 2018 - May 27, 2019
Inseparables, amor al límite	May 27, 2019 - August 19, 2022
Intrusos	July 30, 2018 - September 28, 2018
La descarga	March 11 - June 17, 2024
La caja de los secretos	July 3 - August 19, 2024
La Oreja	2002 - 2008
La tercera en discordia	July 25, 2022 - January 6, 2023
Laura	October 10, 2011 - March 20, 2020
Laura sin censura	July 20, 2020 - April 26, 2021
Lo mejor de ¿Quién tiene la razón?	January 18, 2012 - July 20, 2012
Pequeños Gigantes	November 4, 2013 - December 27, 2013, Season 1; January 13, 2014 - February 14, 2014, Season 2
El Gran Show de los Peques	December 30, 2013 – January 10, 2014
¿Quién Tiene la Razón?	July 7, 2003 – January 30, 2015
Reto 4 Elementos	March 19, 2018 – March 8, 2024
Resistiré	September 24, 2019 - March 6, 2023
Sabadazo	March 19, 2011 - July 14, 2012
Soltero cotizado	October 29 - December 18, 2024
Vas con todo	March 12, 2020 - September 3, 2020
Vence a las estrellas	January 20 - August 8, 2025

==== News/public affairs programming ====
Title	Run
Pasillo TV	April 28, 2014 - August 8, 2014
Tras La Verdad	March 24, 2014 - August 8, 2014

==== Comedy programming ====
Title	Run
40 y 20	July 15, 2016 - August 30, 2019
¡Ay María, Qué Puntería!	2005, first-run January 8, 2012 - January 29, 2012, reruns
Bajo el mismo techo	2009 - 2012
Cero en Conducta	2005
Día de Perros	2009 - 2010
Diseñador de Ambos Sexos	2005
DL & Compañía	June 29, 2020 - July 10, 2020
Dr. Cándido Pérez	January 7, 2012 - March 10, 2012
El Chapulín Colorado	August 26, 2017 - July 25, 2020
El Chavo del 8	May 2, 2011 - July 31, 2020
Family Guy	February 20 - March 24, 2012, first-run October 4 - December 31, 2012, rerun
Hospital El Paisa	2010 - 2012
La CQ	September 21, 2014 - September 21, 2025
La Jaula	2005
Los 10 videos más divertidos del mundo	August 15, 2019 - 2024
La Güereja y Algo Más	2005
Me caigo de risa	July 24, 2018 - April 17, 2020
Mi lista de exes	April 16, 2019 - June 11, 2019
Mita y mita	January 31, 2018 - 2022
Nosotros los guapos	February 2, 2018 - 2024
¡Qué Locura!	February 13, 2012 - December 26, 2014
¡Qué madre tan padre!	May 26, 2008 - September 19, 2008
Renta congelada	February 1, 2018 - May 22, 2019
Según Bibi	October 27, 2018 - December 1, 2018
Simón dice	April 18, 2019 - May 30, 2019
Vecinos	January 29, 2018 - 2024

==== Game shows ====
Title	Run	Ref.
100 Mexicanos Dijeron	October 7, 2002 - June 9, 2006	
La Guerra de los Sexos	2002 - 2005, first-run; January 8, 2012 - January 29, 2012 & March 5, 2012 - April 27, 2012, reruns	
Recuerda y gana	January 9, 2017 - March 2018	
El Juego de las Estrellas	January 17, 2017 - July 1, 2018	
Game Time con Yordi Rosado	July 18, 2018 - July 29, 2018	

==== Sports programming ====
Title	Run
FIFA World Cup	2002 - 2014
FIFA Women's World Cup	2003 - 2011
FIFA Confederations Cup	2003 - 2013
Formula One	March 17, 2013 - November 3, 2019
Lucha Underground	November 1, 2014 - August 8, 2015
Major League Soccer	2007 - 2022
Solo boxeo	April 30, 2016 - 2017
Lucha Libre AAA	June 15, 2024 - December 28, 2024

==== Misc. programming ====
Title	Run
Choques Extremos	2010 - 2015
Rompiendo los Limites	2009 - 2015
XRC	

==== Children's programming ====
Title	Run
Anatole	January 15, 2002 - October 6, 2002
AnimalFanPedia	August 2, 2020 - June 25, 2023
Aventura Animal	October 7, 2012 - April 29, 2018
Betty Toons	July 8, 2006 - December 28, 2008
Bob, El Constructor	August 2, 2003 - September 4, 2005
Cadallicas Y Dinosaurios	March 23, 2002 - July 27, 2003
Cuentos de la Cripta	March 23, 2002 - January 8, 2005
El cubo de Donalú	
El Espacio de Tatiana	
El club de Los Tigritos	
El lagartijo de Ned	March 23, 2002 - January 8, 2005
El nuevo mundo de los gnomos	January 15, 2002 - October 6, 2002
Flight Squad	
Guerreros místicos	January 15, 2002 - December 29, 2002
La pandilla curiosa	December 26, 2021 - November 24, 2024
La vida animal	November 4, 2007 - September 30, 2012
Los conejitos torpes	November 2, 2002 - January 8, 2005
Lost Universe	
Marcelino pan y vino	August 2, 2003 - January 1, 2006
Masha y el oso	September 9, 2018 - December 29, 2019
Patrulla de sapitos	September 6, 2003 - March 11, 2012
Reino Animal	September 10, 2005 - June 9, 2018
Plaza Sésamo	February 19, 2002 - May 7, 2016
Pokémon	November 15, 2017 - February 16, 2018 (Season 14 only)
Problem Child	
Red Baron	
Super Genios	May 14, 2016 - July 26, 2020
Tenchi Universe	
Widget	November 2, 2002 - July 27, 2003
