= Casados con Hijos =

Casados con hijos may refer to:

- Casados con hijos (Colombian TV series), 2004–2006
- Casados con hijos (Argentine TV series), 2005–2006
- Casados con hijos (Mexican TV series), 2024–present
- Casado con hijos (Chilean TV series), 2006–2008

== See also ==
- Married... with Children
