= Pienso en ti (TV series) =

- Genre: Telenovela
- Created by: Ximena Suárez
- Written by: Ximena Suárez; Edwin Valencia; Janely E. Lee Torres; Isabel de Sara
- Directed by: Luis Manzo; Carlos Santos
- Starring: Dulce María; David Zepeda
- Theme music composer: Julio Ramírez; Alejandra Ruiz Ocampo
- Opening theme: "Pienso en ti" by Dulce María and David Zepeda
- Composers: Álvaro Trespalacios; Jaime Vargas Fabila; Jorge Félix Tena Martínez Vara; Óskar Gritten; Luis Guzmán
- Country of origin: Mexico
- Original language: Spanish
- No. of seasons: 1
- No. of episodes: 75

Production
- Executive producer: Carlos Bardasano
- Producer: Carmen Cecilia Urbaneja
- Editor: Alba Merchán Hamann
- Production companies: W Studios; TelevisaUnivision

Original release
- Network: Las Estrellas
- Release: 13 March – 23 June 2023

Pienso en ti (English: Thinking of You) is a Mexican telenovela produced by W Studios for TelevisaUnivision. It is an original story written by Ximena Suárez. The series stars Dulce María and David Zepeda. It aired on Las Estrellas from 13 March 2023 to 23 June 2023.

== Premise ==
Emilia (Dulce María), against her mother's wishes, confronts everyone and everything to pursue her dream of being a successful singer. When Emilia meets Ángel (David Zepeda), her idol, she finds the strength to pursue her dream without imagining that it would be her voice, that would give Ángel back his illusion and his life.

== Cast ==
- Dulce María as Emilia Rivero
- David Zepeda as Ángel Santiago
- Alexis Ayala as Federico Pérez
- Lore Graniewicz as Alicia Garibay
- Brandon Peniche as Manolo Pérez
- Jessica Díaz as Jeanine Loher
- Yolanda Ventura as Daniela Avendaño
- Henry Zakka as Alfonso Rivero
- María Fernanda García as Laura
- Paola Toyos as Pina López
- Claudia Silva as Carla Torreblanca
- Federico Ayos as Omar Miranda
- Ramiro Tomasini as Max Mendoza
- Ariana Saavedra as Gina Rivero
- José Luis Badalt as Rodolfo "Fofo" Manzo
- Julia Argüelles as Mayte Torreblanca
- Edward Castillo as Joel
- Sebastián Poza as Nicolás Torreblanca
- Eugenia Cauduro as Loreta Ortiz
- José Elías Moreno as Sergio Torreblanca

== Production ==
In May 2022, the series was announced at TelevisaUnivision's upfront for the 2022–2023 television season, under the working tile Primero tú. On 19 October 2022, Dulce María and David Zepeda were announced in the lead roles. Filming began on 26 October 2022, with Pienso en ti being announced as the official title of the telenovela and an extended cast list being announced the same day.

== Ratings ==
Viewership and ratings per season of Pienso en ti
| Season | Timeslot (CT) | Episodes | First aired | | Last aired | | Avg. viewers (millions) |
| Season | Timeslot (CT) | Episodes | Date | Viewers (millions) | Date | Viewers (millions) | Avg. viewers (millions) |
|---|---|---|---|---|---|---|---|
| 1 | Mon–Fri 8:30 p.m. | 75 | 13 March 2023 | 3.2 | 23 June 2023 | 3.3 | 2.98 |

== Episodes ==
| No. | Title | Original release date | Mexico viewers (millions) |
|---|---|---|---|
| 1 | "Te regalo lo que soy" | 13 March 2023 (Note: Premiered early online through Las Estrellas website on 10 March 2023.) | 3.2 |
An argument between Manolo and Federico over L2-22's new tour dates prompts Loreta to intercede, but a health crisis prevents her from doing so. Daniela discovers Emilia's secret and lashes out at her for having lied to her. The moment goes viral on social media. Federico tries to convince Manolo to continue on the tour and causes him to continue drinking. Ángel discovers Emilia at L2-22's concert and invites her on stage.
| 2 | "Acabaste con esta familia" | 14 March 2023 | 2.9 |
Jeanine is upset at Ángel for singing with another woman on stage and not with her. Ángel assures her that it was just a fan that she shouldn't worry about. Emilia visits Omar at his house and finds him in bed with another woman. Emilia insists on pursuing her dream of being a singer, but Daniela refuses to support her and asks her to leave the house. When saying goodbye, Emilia is rejected by her mother.
| 3 | "En mis manos vas a ser una leyenda" | 15 March 2023 | 3.1 |
Jeanine asks Federico to support her in her musical career. Ángel arranges to meet Jeanine to give her the engagement ring, but is interrupted by the assault suffered by Manolo. Jeanine attends her appointment with Federico to agree on their plans for her career, but Federico reveals that he knows the truth about her past. Pina shows Federico the great resemblance that Emilia has with an old acquaintance of both of them.
| 4 | "Necesito que me respetes" | 16 March 2023 | 3.1 |
Jeanine remembers that Federico took advantage of her, in her attempt to become a singer. Jeanine receives an expensive gift from Federico, but he wants something in return. Manolo is not getting paid for his tours because Federico is taking advantage of the situation. Federico tries to take advantage of Jeanine once again, but they are interrupted by Ángel.
| 5 | "No mezclar amor con trabajo" | 17 March 2023 | 2.9 |
Manolo confesses to Angel that the chemistry he had with Emilia on stage is not the same with Jeanine. In the middle of L2-22's press conference, the press questions the group about the habits that persist between them. Faced with Federico's denial, one of the reporters shows images of Manolo and his drinking problem. Emilia attends Ángel's birthday party as a waitress. In the middle of Ángel's birthday party, Manolo discovers Federico's infidelity with Jeanine.
| 6 | "Manolo está muerto" | 20 March 2023 | 2.9 |
Manolo confronts his father about his relationship with Jeanine and the theft from the record label. Manolo asks Ángel not to marry Jeanine; Ángel is furious and after an argument, Manolo takes his motorcycle and suffers an accident. Federico puts the blame of Manolo's death on Ángel for letting him drive under the influence. Ángel is confronted by a group of men; Emilia arrives on the scene and defends him.
| 7 | "La música se acabó para mí" | 21 March 2023 | 3.0 |
Max and Emilia take Ángel home after the fight he had at the cantina, Ángel recognizes Emilia. Federico looks for Ángel to reconcile and continue with the band's plans, but Ángel tells him that he will not return to music. Omar tries to intimidate Emilia into getting back together with him. Ángel confesses to Jeanine that the night of the party was to celebrate their engagement, but because it did not go as expected, he now asks her to be his wife.
| 8 | "Piérdete de mi vida" | 22 March 2023 | 3.1 |
Jeanine tells Federico that Ángel wants to marry her as soon as possible; Federico assures her that she belongs to him and he is only willing to share her with Ángel. Ángel finds the documents that prove an embezzlement in L2-22 and the record company and, with Max's help, manages to communicate with Alicia, since she was the one who saw Manolo with the documents. Ángel visits Federico to show him the documents that Manolo had.
| 9 | "Terapia de choque" | 23 March 2023 | 2.9 |
Ángel complains to Federico about the balances that Manolo had before he died. Carla discovers through the television the images in which Ángel attacks Federico. Jeanine finds Ángel once again drunk and when she asks him to cooperate, she loses her patience and decides to leave. Emilia appears at the Loreta Music offices for her meeting with Federico, who is surprised by her resemblance to Daniela Avendaño.
| 10 | "El infierno de estar con un alcohólico" | 24 March 2023 | 2.8 |
Jeanine finds Emilia in Federico's office and warns her that she has a long way to go to make it in the music industry. Emilia goes to Ángel's house to get her notebook and takes the opportunity to sing in the studio. Ángel recognizes the voice and when he goes downstairs, he finds that no one is there. Jeanine feels jealous of Emilia and in the middle of an outburst makes statements to the press against Ángel. Emilia confronts Ángel because she believes he made the decision to fire Max.
| 11 | "Ya no soy tu Ángel" | 27 March 2023 | 2.8 |
Federico believes that Jeanine is doing the opposite of what he told her to do with Ángel and so he decides not to support her in her singing career. Jeanine goes back to Ángel's house as if nothing bad had happened, but is met with his contempt and he runs kicks out of his house. Ángel shows up at the bar where Emilia sings and goes on stage to repeat the moment from his concert.
| 12 | "Haces que todo lo malo parezca sencillo" | 28 March 2023 | 3.2 |
Federico is ready to withdraw his support from Jeanine, but she is willing to do anything to keep his support. Jeanine goes to Ángel's house to clear things up, but finds Emilia in her underwear. Jeanine shows Emilia's embarrassing moment to Ángel. Ángel surprises Emilia before her first performance.
| 13 | "Tengo que acabar con ella" | 29 March 2023 | 2.8 |
Jeanine plants drugs in the bar where Emilia sings and ruins her performance. Ángel hesitates about attending Manolo's tribute, but Emilia urges him to do so. Ángel finds out that Federico is looking to replace Manolo's place in the band and tells him that he no longer wants him as his manager.
| 14 | "En mí tienes a una amiga" | 30 March 2023 | 3.2 |
Federico will do everything possible to prevent Ángel from discovering the embezzlement of L2-22, and will even try to keep him in the group. Ángel visits Emilia at her house to surprise Max. Jeanine shows up at Ángel's house to show him the song she prepared for him to get his forgiveness.
| 15 | "Siento que te pertenezco" | 31 March 2023 | 2.7 |
Jeanine's words against Emilia cause Ángel to kick her out of the house again. Ángel visits Emilia to give her a couple of gifts, but she refuses to receive the jewel he gave her. In the middle of the conversation, they confess their feelings and end up kissing, but are surprised by Emilia's parents.
| 16 | "Lástima de suegra" | 3 April 2023 | 2.5 |
Daniela can't stand to see that Emilia could be in a relationship and insults Ángel. Emilia wants to know the reasons why her mother is not happy with her decision to become a singer; Daniela decides confess everything she experienced in the past. Alfonso receives a strong warning from the doctor about his health condition. Federico is surprised by Max's talent, which he will use to keep Ángel in the group.
| 17 | "Cree en mi música" | 4 April 2023 | 2.6 |
Pina advises Jeanine not to lose Federico's support because she could be left with nothing. Emilia asks Ángel not to go so fast with their relationship, due to his recent breakup with Jeanine. Ángel shows Emilia the song he made, thanks to her inspiration. Daniela is angry when she learns that Emilia saw Ángel and after an argument, Alfonso suffers a heart attack. Jeanine bursts in on Ángel's date and when she notices Emilia, she hugs Ángel.
| 18 | "Tratar a un exnovio" | 5 April 2023 | 2.6 |
Ángel apologizes to Emilia for hugging Jeanine, but Emilia questions his feelings for his ex-girlfriend. Ángel visits Manolo's grave and finds Carla, who says she regrets opening the doors of her house to him. Omar takes advantage of Emilia being alone to steal a kiss, but Ángel and Jeanine show up and see them.
| 19 | "No pudo cantar" | 6 April 2023 | 2.4 |
Ángel apologizes to Emilia for questioning her and admits that it is all because his feelings for her are growing day by day. Ángel shows up at Manolo's tribute, but he can't forget his friend, so he flees. Federico is upset because Ángel could not show up at Manolo's tribute. Jeanine receives a call that Ángel is in bad shape and goes to his location, but tries to seduce him.
| 20 | "Vamos a perder hasta la camisa" | 7 April 2023 | 2.1 |
Ángel wakes up in bed next to Jeanine, but cannot remember what happened between them. Emilia arrives at Ángel's house to check on him, but finds out that Ángel spent the night with Jeanine and breaks up with him.
| 21 | "Ya no puedo creer en ti" | 10 April 2023 | 2.7 |
Omar takes advantage of Carla's vulnerable situation to get into her life, but Federico's appearance ruins it. Jeanine receives the news that Federico will change her career plans for something bigger. Jeanine sees Emilia at the reality show auditions and tries to provoke her by lying about what happened with Ángel.
| 22 | "El destino sí existe" | 11 April 2023 | 3.0 |
Emilia and Jeanine get their pass to participate in the reality show Talento hay. The contest begins and Emilia is the first to choose the song of a famous composer, without thinking that the song she chose is by Ángel.
| 23 | "Mucho trabajo, muchas decepciones" | 12 April 2023 | 2.8 |
Jeanine hears some speculation from the participants of the reality show she is in and contributes by mentioning that Emilia had romantic encounters with Federico. Emilia is surprised to hear the song that Ángel prepared for the contest, but when she finds out how it came about, she can't hide her jealousy. Federico offers to take Emilia to the door of her house and sees Daniela, an old acquaintance.
| 24 | "Emilia será para mí" | 13 April 2023 | 2.9 |
Federico and Daniela catch up on what has happened in their lives, but he ends up questioning her about whether Sergio is Emilia's father, while Daniela makes some requests to him about Emilia and her singing career. Daniela begs Alfonso not to tell her daughters about her mysterious past. Alfonso remembers the secret he keeps with Daniela about Emilia's origin.
| 25 | "L222 se acabó" | 14 April 2023 | 2.6 |
Ángel confesses to Federico that his decision to leave Loreta Music is because of what Carla told him, Federico tries to convince him to stay to prevent his fraud from becoming known. Federico bursts out in anger against Carla for pushing Ángel away from the company. Federico interrupts Ángel's statements in front of the press to stand up for him and explain the reasons for his departure from L2-22. Jeanine calls Ángel to clarify what is going on with Emilia.
| 26 | "No le sigas el juego" | 17 April 2023 | 3.0 |
Ángel seeks out Emilia's parents to confront them about the scandal their daughter is involved in. Daniela, to avoid any misinterpretation, asks Emilia to stay away from Ángel. Emilia receives the news that she will be eliminated from the reality show because of her scandal. Emilia throws away her headphones and Sergio picks them up to give them to her, but is speechless when he sees that she looks like an old acquaintance.
| 27 | "¡Él es el padre de Emilia!" | 18 April 2023 | 2.8 |
Emilia arrives home and discovers a group of reporters outside questioning her about her relationship with Ángel. Emilia tells Ángel that Federico offered to be her manager, but he remembers that the same thing happened with Jeanine. Daniela confesses to Laura the reasons why she wants Emilia away from the music world, one of them is that she could meet her biological father.
| 28 | "Probar las delicias de la fama" | 19 April 2023 | 3.0 |
Daniela can't stop thinking about how Sergio abandoned her during her pregnancy to go back to Loreta. Ángel reveals to Jeanine that he had nothing to do with Emilia not leaving the reality show, it was all Federico's doing. Jeanine complains to Federico for advocating for Emilia in the reality show, but is surprised to learn that he will also be her manager.
| 29 | "Te voy a grabar tu primer disco" | 20 April 2023 | 2.9 |
Pina overhears the participants of the reality show speculating about Emilia's relationship with the executives and records them to launch a video scandal. Emilia tries to surprise Ángel with her visit, but she is surprised to see Jeanine walking with Ángel, and decides to put a stop to any kind of relationship to focus on her career. Emilia wants to know what Sergio is like and when she questions Federico, he speaks ill of him.
| 30 | "Mi música eres tú" | 21 April 2023 | 2.8 |
Omar overhears a suspicious phone call from Federico and discovers his and Jeanine's relationship. Sergio confesses to Federico that seeing Emilia has stirred his memories. Federico asks Sergio to forget about the past and focus on his family. Emilia and Ángel perform a song in the reality show and receive a standing ovation.
| 31 | "¡Yo no tengo precio!" | 24 April 2023 | 2.8 |
Federico proposes to Emilia to lose the competition in exchange for a lucrative contract with Loreta Music, but she rejects the idea. Ángel thinks that Emilia accepted Federico's deal and tries to confront her. Jeanine visits Ángel to give him his belongings but he asks her to stay by his side. Alfonso finds photographs of Daniela's past in which there are several compromising messages.
| 32 | "En estado crítico" | 25 April 2023 | 2.8 |
Alfonso confronts Daniela for having lied to him about her feelings and in his desperation to flee the house, he ends up with another health crisis. Emilia leaves the competition to get to the hospital, but faces an economic problem to get Alfonso out of his crisis. Jeanine is crowned first place in the reality show. Ángel finds out that Emilia relied on Federico to save Alfonso; after the disappointment, he decides to go home where he sleeps with Jeanine.
| 33 | "Te mueres de celos" | 26 April 2023 | 3.0 |
Emilia tries to contact Ángel to talk about her problems and he refuses to answer the call. Federico is surprised to learn that Omar knows his secret with Jeanine and gives in to his blackmail. Emilia arrives at Ángel's house and finds out that Jeanine spent the night. Federico sets a trap for Ángel and makes him believe that Emilia is looking for money at all costs.
| 34 | "Mi ganancia va a ser Emilia" | 27 April 2023 | 3.1 |
Ángel discovers that he made a mistake in judging Emilia and tries to apologize but she kicks him out of the house. Daniela confesses to Federico that Sergio is Emilia's father.
| 35 | "Esto es un asunto personal" | 28 April 2023 | 2.8 |
Sergio is confused about Angél's reaction to seeing him and after a strong argument, he asks him to leave the record label. Seeing that her strategy is not working, Jeanine visits Ángel to put an end to their relationship, but he apologizes for his mistakes and they give each other another chance. Alfonso wakes up from his surgery and tells Emilia that he wants to separate from Daniela.
| 36 | "Voy a hacer lo mejor para mi carrera" | 1 May 2023 | 2.8 |
Daniela receives the news that Alfonso wants to divorce her, but is afraid that her secret will come out. Jeanine sees Emilia in Federico's office and shows off her engagement ring to her. Ángel seeks out Emilia to clarify everything about his engagement to Jeanine, but Emilia rejects him and accepts that she only used him. Daniela visits Alfonso in the hospital to check on his health, but is confronted with his rejection.
| 37 | "No revivas el pasado" | 2 May 2023 | 3.0 |
Daniela confronts Laura and asks her to stay away from Alfonso. After confessing to Max that she loves Alfonso, Laura seeks out Daniela to tell her that she does not intend to leave Alfonso and warns her that she could reveal her secret. Sergio suddenly appears in the recording studio and his approach to Emilia provokes strange looks among those present.
| 38 | "Mi cielo nunca se había oscurecido de día" | 3 May 2023 | 2.9 |
Ángel remembers Federico's comments about Sergio and believes that the latter has a special interest in Emilia, so he decides to confront him. Max talks about Emilia's mannerisms in front of everyone and causes Sergio to remember the same phrases in Daniela's voice. Sergio confesses to Emilia that he wants to get to know her closely, but she is suspicious because of everything Federico has told her. Emilia arrives home and tells her mother that she had dinner with Sergio, a fact that provokes Daniela's anger.
| 39 | "El cadáver de un gran fraude" | 4 May 2023 | 3.0 |
Daniela remembers the party where she was raped and blames Sergio for the crime. Federico hides cameras in Emilia's dressing room and observes her every move. Ticha and Alfonso continue with Ángel's accounting, but they notice something shady. Federico could be in danger because of the bad dealings with L2-22.
| 40 | "La punta del iceberg" | 5 May 2023 | 3.1 |
Jeanine throws coffee on one of the computers where Emilia and Ángel's video clip is being recorded, with the intention of separating them. Ticha talks to Ángel to reveal what she and Alfonso found among his accounts and confirms that the money was stolen from the record label. Ángel warns Sergio of the fraud he discovered at the record label, but Sergio turns to Federico. Ángel enters Federico's office and finds Jeanine in an intimate situation with Federico.
| 41 | "Un circo tu vida" | 8 May 2023 | 3.2 |
Ángel breaks up with Jeanine because of her betrayal with Federico. Federico plans everything so that Ángel's statements don't get out of control. Federico tells Sergio that he kissed Jeanine and this unleashed Ángel's jealousy. Jeanine is questioned by the press about Ángel's absence at the presentation of the album and she confirms their breakup.
| 42 | "¡Emilia es mi hija!" | 9 May 2023 | 3.1 |
Pina convinces Jeanine to do a live broadcast to clarify what happened with Ángel. Jeanine she lies and says that Ángel is a violent man. Ángel is furious about what was fabricated against him, but in front of the whole Torreblanca family he confirms that Federico and Jeanine are lovers. Sergio receives the results of the test he sent for and confirms that Emilia is his daughter.
| 43 | "Contigo o sin ti" | 10 May 2023 | 2.8 |
Federico looks for the person who will do the audit at Loreta Music to make him a deal and cover up his crimes at the record label. Gina discovers that her mother could be the woman Loreta talks about in her diary and begins to investigate Daniela's past. Ángel tries to solve his problems with Emilia, Alfonso takes advantage of his visit to talk about Federico and they promise to watch Emilia's steps. Sergio arrives at Emilia's house and confronts Daniela for hiding the paternity of the child she was expecting.
| 44 | "Te quiero lejos de mi hija" | 11 May 2023 | 3.3 |
Daniela accuses Sergio of being an unscrupulous man, but he denies everything she says. Daniela seeks Federico's help to prevent Emilia from being close to Sergio. Emilia tells Sergio that Federico already knows her mother and he sees it as a betrayal. Jeanine interrupts Ángel's photo shoot to talk about her mistakes, but he asks her to reveal the truth about Federico in front of Emilia and Mayte.
| 45 | "Te quiero como una tonta" | 12 May 2023 | 3.0 |
Federico interrupts Jeanine's conversation with Ángel to prevent her from revealing more than she should. While Emilia and the Centauros succeed on their tour, Jeanine is in many deep problems that she doesn't care about her career. Emilia mistakes a romantic date for Ticha thinking it is for her. In the middle of a crisis, she runs into Ángel and complains to him for ruining everything, he kisses her.
| 46 | "Los declaro marido y mujer" | 15 May 2023 | 3.5 |
Gina finds Alfonso close to Laura and confronts them about their apparent relationship. Gina tells Daniela what she saw and she takes the opportunity to play the victim. Emilia and Ángel wake up after spending the night together, but he wants to formalize their relationship. Emilia and Ángel marry in secret, but are caught by Federico, who is furious to see them together. Jeanine receives the news of Emilia and Ángel's wedding, and ends up heartbroken.
| 47 | "¡Fuera golpeador de mujeres!" | 16 May 2023 | 3.5 |
Rita causes Jeanine to lose control, due to the images she shows her of Ángel's wedding to Emilia. Federico argues with Rita on the phone and lashes out at her for getting Emilia in trouble, but this conversation is overheard by Eva. In the middle of a performance, Ángel is booed by the audience, who make him leave the stage, after accusations of aggression. After consulting with Federico, Sergio decides to take Ángel out of the tour with Emilia.
| 48 | "Me voy a quedar en la calle" | 17 May 2023 | 3.4 |
Daniela confronts Ticha for helping Emilia and kicks her out of the house. Jeanine confesses to Pina that it was Federico who gave her the pills and Pina remembers that some time ago, he did the same with Daniela. The accountant tells Ángel that the sponsors are demanding payment of the fine for the cancellation of the concert. Pina finds Daniela and when Daniela sees her, she is horrified when she remembers what happened with Federico.
| 49 | "Un cabo suelto en esta historia" | 18 May 2023 | 2.9 |
Federico tries to manipulate Emilia by warning her that Ángel's impulse to marry was not his first time. Daniela comments to Federico that Pina knows the truth about the night she was attacked and he fears being caught. Federico confronts Pina to buy her silence again but when she refuses, he kills her.
| 50 | "¿Dónde está tu lealtad?" | 19 May 2023 | 2.9 |
Federico calls Omar to help him with an urgent matter, he agrees without knowing that it is to clean up a crime scene. While cleaning Pina's apartment, Jeanine knocks on the door, Federico opts to seduce her to distract her while Omar finishes the job. Devastated by Pina's disappearance, Jeanine investigates her belongings and discovers that Emilia is Sergio's daughter.
| 51 | "He sido muy mala" | 22 May 2023 | 3.2 |
Ángel asks Jeanine not to publish Pina's video in order to avoid Emilia's suffering. Jeanine remembers her story with Ángel and how Emilia was an obstacle in their relationship, which leads her to think that he will not help her with her aunt. Sergio pursues Daniela to talk about Emilia, but Daniela loses control and slaps him. Ángel looks for Jeanine to take care of her health, but she takes advantage of the situation and takes his phone to answer Emilia's call.
| 52 | "Eres hija de Sergio Torreblanca" | 23 May 2023 | 3.6 |
Ángel tries to explain to Emilia what happened with Jeanine, but is careful not to reveal her relationship with the Torreblanca family. Daniela complains to Ángel for hurting Emilia, but he tells her that he does it all to spare her the pain of finding out that she is Sergio Torreblanca's daughter. Daniela tries to explain to Ángel what happened with Pina, but she remembers the moment when Sergio took her by force. Emilia seeks out Jeanine to offer her help, but Jeanine confesses to her that she is a Torreblanca.
| 53 | "Pagar los platos rotos" | 24 May 2023 | 3.2 |
After Jeanine's declarations, Emilia assures her that she is Alfonso's daughter and not Sergio's. Federico fears that the truth about Emilia will come out and tries to turn Daniela against Ángel. Ángel and Alfonso try to convince Daniela that the best thing for Emilia is for her to know the truth about her relationship with Sergio, but she is completely opposed. Emilia arrives home to confront her mother about what Jeanine revealed to her.
| 54 | "He vivido una mentira" | 25 May 2023 | 2.7 |
Daniela faces Emilia and Gina after her secret is revealed. Faced with the betrayal, Emilia blames her mother for manipulating her and ruining her life. Emilia and Gina question Daniela about her relationship with Federico. Alfonso apologizes to Emilia for not revealing the truth of her past, despite everything, Emilia forgives him.
| 55 | "¡Yo no soy su hija!" | 26 May 2023 | 3.3 |
Alfonso confesses to Emilia that Federico may have provoked a fraud on Ángel, but she refuses to believe it. Emilia confronts Ángel for hiding the truth about her past and after an argument, she decides to forgive him. Emilia seeks out Sergio to make it clear that she will never see him as her father for all the pain he caused her family. Pina's video comes to light and goes viral. The Torreblanca's discover that Emilia is Sergio's daughter.
| 56 | "Un callejón sin salida" | 29 May 2023 | 3.1 |
Loreta despises Sergio when she learns the truth and kicks him out of the house. Jeanine publicly accuses Sergio as the author of Pina's disappearance. Carla looks for Loreta to console her after what happened with Sergio, but she rejects her for hiding his infidelity. Federico proposes to Emilia to release a statement about what happened with Sergio, but she announces her departure from the label.
| 57 | "Un drama digno de un best seller" | 30 May 2023 | 3.3 |
Emilia opposes to continue with Loreta Music, but this changes Federico's plans. Federico offers Jacobo a large sum of money in exchange for preventing the tour between Ángel and Emilia. Loreta makes a broadcast to clear up the scandal about Sergio, but ends up hurting Emilia and Daniela with her statements. Jacobo informs Ángel and Emilia that their tour together cannot take place, due to the scandal Emilia is facing.
| 58 | "Atacar por todos los frentes" | 31 May 2023 | 3.1 |
Jacobo convinces Ángel to sign the tour contract with a lucrative amount. Federico manages to separate Emilia from Ángel. Ángel confesses to Rita that his problems with Federico ended after the death of his father, which puts Rita in doubt.
| 59 | "Es mejor tener las cosas claras" | 1 June 2023 | 3.1 |
Federico finds out that Beba has started an investigation into the strange death of Ángel's father and fears that the truth will come out. After an argument, Jeanine and Omar spend the night together, but she fears that Federico will find out.
| 60 | "No se pueden juntar el oro y las cenizas" | 2 June 2023 | 2.7 |
Daniela overhears Emilia and Alfonso's conversation in which he is congratulated for his upcoming wedding with Laura. Daniela sends a voice message to Laura to congratulate her on her wedding to Alfonso, but it is only to ruin the surprise that Alfonso had prepared for her. Time passes and Emilia manages to establish herself as a singer, but Ángel does not have the same luck. Jeanine joins Ángel on stage during his performance.
| 61 | "Mi artista exclusiva" | 5 June 2023 | 3.0 |
Emilia agrees to be part of Federico's company, as long as she has the rights to his songs, leaving Federico and Daniela surprised. Daniela shows Emilia the photos of Ángel and Jeanine's performance at his concert, leaving Emilia heartbroken. Sergio watches Emilia's press conference and is surprised to learn about Federico's new musical platform. Federico insists on taking advantage of Emilia and in addition to stealing from her, he wants her as his wife.
| 62 | "Sacar a las personas nocivas" | 6 June 2023 | 2.9 |
Emilia finds out that Sergio raped her mother and doesn't hesitate to confront him. Emilia talks to her mother about the misfortune she experienced with Sergio, Daniela reveals what she remembers. Emilia is manipulated by her mother and is determined to stay away from Ángel. Ángel convinces Emilia to take a break in their relationship to avoid a definitive separation.
| 63 | "El ángel se convirtió en demonio" | 7 June 2023 | 3.3 |
Federico takes advantage of Ángel's outburst to speak ill of him. Emilia complains to Federico for having kept the secret of her origin. Carla questions Loreta's motives for not being upset about Sergio's infidelity. Alfonso explains to Ángel his suspicions that Federico is keeping a secret and they plan to unmask him. Ángel asks Sergio for help to unmask Federico.
| 64 | "El verdadero monstruo de la historia" | 8 June 2023 | 3.1 |
Federico shows Emilia the contract in which he offers her more money than she asks for and she agrees to sign for 7 years. Ángel informs Sergio that Federico was the one who assured Daniela that he was the one who abused her. Sergio confronts Federico and remembering that he was the only one who knew his disguise and suspects the worst of him. Sergio shows up at Alfonso's house and Ángel offers them to unite for Emilia's sake to confront Federico.
| 65 | "No tengo nada que perder" | 9 June 2023 | 3.1 |
Ángel asks Alfonso and Sergio to look for proof of Federico's crimes. Jeanine apologizes to Ángel for everything she has done, but he asks her not to look for him again. Alicia rejects Emilia's plan to find evidence against Federico and decides to quit the tour, Emilia begs her not to leave. Jeanine remembers that her aunt Pina left some tapes in her house and when she views them, she finds out that Federico was Daniela's real aggressor. Omar, seeing Jeanine upset, kisses her, but they are caught by Maite.
| 66 | "Nada es para siempre" | 12 June 2023 | 3.1 |
Ángel proposes to Emilia to get married in church, he receives a call from Jeanine and Emilia gets jealous. Omar arrives at Jeanine's apartment and finds the recording of Federico with Daniela, he arranges the scene as if Jeanine had provoked her own death in order to steal the evidence. Ángel enters Jeanine's apartment and confirms that she is still alive. The doctor informs Ángel that despite having taken Jeanine in time for her to receive medical attention, her health is fragile.
| 67 | "Dame el divorcio" | 13 June 2023 | 3.1 |
The doctor informs Ángel that Jeanine could not have consumed so many substances on her own. Ángel asks the doctor for help in finding a way to hide Jeanine and protect her. Federico recalls his past with Daniela and realizes that he is no longer interested in her, but admits that he is obsessed with Emilia. Federico's lawyer visits Ángel with a divorce complaint, he confronts Emilia to tell him the reasons for her decision. Ángel reveals to Emilia all the atrocities in which Federico has been involved, so she begins to distrust him and believes that Ángel is right.
| 68 | "Esta vez yo tengo la correa" | 14 June 2023 | 3.1 |
Emilia questions Daniela about her particular interest in Federico, Daniela is defensive and excuses her behavior. Ángel publicly announces the complaint he filed against Federico for robbery and calls on other artists to join his cause; Emilia is surprised. Federico is threatened with a firearm.
| 69 | "Se quiere quedar con mi mujer" | 15 June 2023 | 3.2 |
Federico points to Ángel and Sergio as the main suspects in his attack. Bermudez complains to Omar for going behind his back, he convinces him that it is better for him to be alive than dead. Reyna visits Ángel to warn him about Federico's closeness with Emilia. Loreta manages to forgive Sergio.
| 70 | "Un rayo de esperanza" | 16 June 2023 | 2.8 |
While Alfonso reviews the case of the attack against Federico, Max recognizes the assailant. Maite tries to reconcile with Emilia. Federico plans a makeover for Emilia by exploiting her sensuality, she worries about his intentions. Carla confirms that what she was taking as psychiatric treatment were illegal substances and denounces Federico for poisoning.
| 71 | "La verdad siempre sale a la luz" | 19 June 2023 | 2.9 |
Jeanine confesses to Ángel everything Federico forced her to do in exchange for his silence. Omar manages to escape the authorities, but the police gather evidence to search his house. Emilia shares with Ángel that she has already gained Federico's trust to get the evidence to prove that he is a scammer. Ángel finds a USB drive with enough evidence of Federico's crimes.
| 72 | "Mi hermano murió por culpa de su padre" | 20 June 2023 | 2.9 |
Upon analyzing Manolo's documents, Ángel discovers that Federico audited events the band never did and believes he is laundering money. Emilia infiltrates Federico's office and takes the hard drives to make a copy of his accounting. Omar uses Sam to enter Jeanine's room without being caught and attacks her.
| 73 | "No hay mujer hermosa sin unos zapatos rojos" | 21 June 2023 | 3.0 |
Gabriela returns to the hospital and witnesses the attack Jeanine is receiving, she defends her and Joel comes to her aid. Federico suspects that Emilia betrayed him and makes her an offer to she can't refuse. Daniela confirms with a phrase from Federico that it was him who raped her years ago.
| 74 | "No van a salir vivos" | 22 June 2023 | 3.3 |
Emilia argues with Federico over the red shoes he wants her to wear and when she tries to get out of the car, he intoxicates her in order to kidnap her. Daniela confesses having told Federico everything and Gina holds her responsible for anything that could happen to Emilia. The Commander comments to Ángel that the description of Jeanine's attacker matches Lalo, Federico's bodyguard. Emilia attacks Federico and manages to escape, Ángel rescues her and confronts Federico.
| 75 | "El amor sana cualquier herida" | 23 June 2023 | 3.3 |
Daniela admits her mistake in treating Ángel badly and apologizes to him. Jeanine looks for Emilia and Ángel to apologize for what she did to them. Federico asks for Carla's help by claiming that Ángel set him up, but she turns him in to the authorities. Loreta fulfills her dream of seeing her family united and dies accompanied by Sergio. During a concert with Ángel, Emilia announces that she is pregnant.
