= Adrián Uribe =

Mexican actor, comedian and TV host

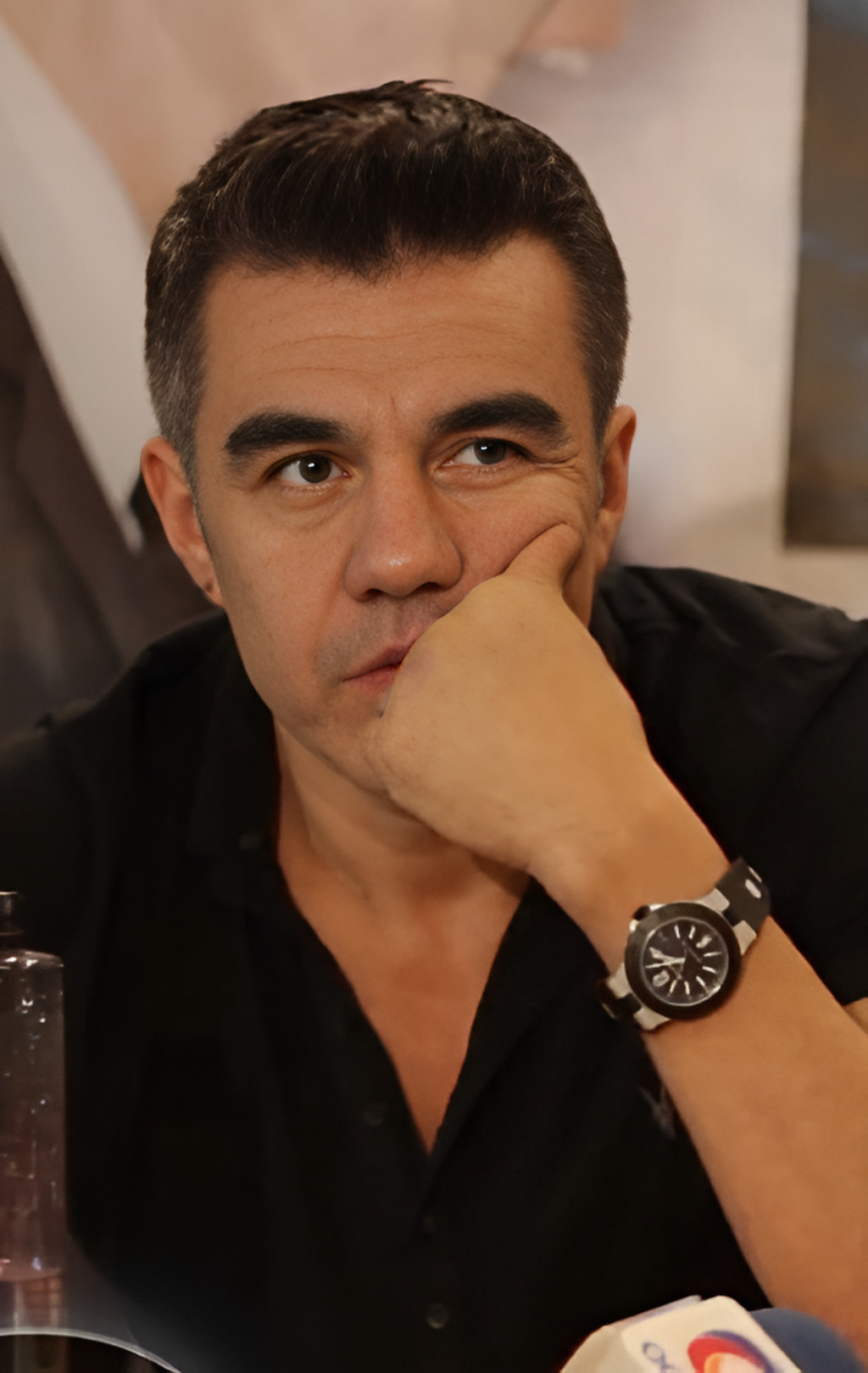
- Adrián Uribe in 2017
- Born: Adrián García Uribe; September 8, 1972 (age 54); Mexico City, Mexico
- Occupation: Actor
- Years active: 2000–present
- Spouse: Karla Pineda (m. 2002; div. 2008) Thuany Martins (m. 2021)
- Children: 2

Adrián Garcia Uribe (born September 8, 1972) is a Mexican actor, comedian and television host. He is recognized for his roles as El Vítor, Carmelo and Poncho Aurelio at La hora pico, and for his co-lead role as Johnny in Mi corazón es tuyo. In 2020, he starred as the lead in Como tú no hay 2.

== Filmography ==
=== Film ===
Year	Title	Role	Notes
2003	Brother Bear	Tuke	Voice role; Spanish dubbing
2004	Garfield: The Movie	Garfield	Voice role; Spanish dubbing
2006	Garfield: A Tail of Two Kitties	Garfield	Voice role; Spanish dubbing
2009	Cabeza de buda	Enrico	
2012	Suave patria	Arturo Ordoñes	
2014	Mr. Peabody & Sherman	Peabody	Voice role; Spanish dubbing
2016	Dos policías en apuros	Septiembre	
2016	The Angry Birds Movie	Red	Voice role; Spanish dubbing
2018	Overboard	Burrito	
2022	Unhappily Ever After	Estelar	
2024	El candidato honesto	Tonatiuh "Tona" Pérez Prieto	

=== Television ===
Year	Title	Role	Notes
2000	Humor es, los comediantes	Poncho Aurelio	
2000–07	La hora pico	Various roles	300 episodes
2005	Vecinos	Hermano de la Luz	Episode: "La luz interior"
2006	Mujer, casos de la vida real	Various roles	5 episodes
2008–09	Alma de hierro	Ezequiel	391 episodes
2009–present	100 mexicanos dijeron	El Vítor	Host
2009	Hermanos y detectives	Mansilla	13 episodes
2011	Los héroes del norte	El Junior	Episode: "La despedida"
2012	Adictos	Mark	Episode: "Adicto a la estafa"
2012	Por ella soy Eva	Chilo Mendoza	2 episodes
2014	Republica Mundialista	Various roles	7 episodes
2014–15	Mi corazón es tuyo	Johnny	176 episodes
2016–2020	Nosotros los guapos	El Vítor	Main role
2019, 2021	¿Quién es la máscara?	Himself	Panelist (season 1); Host (season 3)
2020	Como tú no hay 2	Ricardo/Toño	Lead role
2022	Pena ajena	Jesús	Lead role
2022–present	De noche pero sin sueño	Himself	Host
2024–present	Casados con hijos	Alfonso "Poncho" Olivares	Main role
2025-present	Piensa Rápido, Piensa Rápido VIP	Himself	Host
