= Pena ajena (TV series) =

- Genre: Comedy
- Based on: Vergüenza by Álvaro Fernández Armero and Juan Cavestany
- Written by: Santiago Fábregas; Diego Graue; Francisco González Payó; Dariela Pérez Hernández
- Directed by: Santiago Fábregas; Diego Graue
- Starring: Adrián Uribe; Mónica Huarte
- Composer: Chris Walden
- Country of origin: Mexico
- Original language: Spanish
- No. of seasons: 1
- No. of episodes: 10

Production
- Executive producers: Giulia Cardamone; Abel Cruz; Adrián Uribe; Diego Suárez Chialvo; Enrique López Lavigne; Mario Almeida; Paul Presburger; Pablo Cruz; Santiago Fábregas
- Producer: Aaron Rivera-Ashford
- Editor: David Torres
- Production company: El Estudio

Original release
- Network: Pantaya
- Release: 19 May 2022

Pena ajena is a Mexican comedy streaming television series, based on the Spanish television series Vergüenza, created by Álvaro Fernández Armero and Juan Cavestany. It premiered on Pantaya on 19 May 2022 and stars Adrián Uribe and Mónica Huarte.

== Premise ==
Jesús (Adrián Uribe), is photographer for socialites and is married to Nuria (Mónica Huarte), who dreams of becoming a mom. Jesús and Nuria constantly find themselves in embarrassing situations and saying the wrong thing at the wrong time. However, they manage to save each other from awkward moments.

== Cast ==
- Adrián Uribe as Jesús
- Mónica Huarte as Nuria
- Dominika Paleta
- Angélica Germanetti
- Jorge Caballero
- Luz María Jerez
- Juan Carlos Colombo

== Episodes ==
No.	Title	Original release date
1	"La ventana"	19 May 2022
2	"El campeón"	19 May 2022
3	"El senador"	19 May 2022
4	"La despedida"	19 May 2022
5	"La clase de Inglés"	19 May 2022
6	"La pedida de mano"	19 May 2022
7	"Nuria se va"	19 May 2022
8	"El pueblo mágico"	19 May 2022
9	"Fermín y Tere"	19 May 2022
10	"La exposición"	19 May 2022
