= Un paso hacia ti =

- Genre: Teen drama
- Created by: Andrés Montoya; Lina Arbolada
- Written by: Andrés Montoya; Lina Arbolada; Magalli Urquieta
- Directed by: Andŕes Lizarazo
- Starring: Davi Ulloa; Pamela Cervantes
- Theme music composer: Carlos Lara; Lynda Thomas
- Opening theme: "Un paso hacia ti" by Davi Ulloa & Pamela Cervantes
- Country of origin: Mexico
- Original language: Spanish
- No. of seasons: 1
- No. of episodes: 20

Production
- Executive producer: Luis Luisillo Miguel
- Producers: Abimelek Betanzos; Leandro Antonio Martínez H.
- Cinematography: Javier Morón
- Editor: Kevin Raúl López Yáñez
- Production companies: TelevisaUnivision; Said Bi Entertainment

Original release
- Network: Canal 5
- Release: 27 July – 21 August 2026

Un paso hacia ti (English: One Step Closer to You) is a Mexican teen drama television series created by Andrés Montoya and Lina Arbolada. The series follows the lives of Kevin (portrayed by Davi Ulloa) and Ana Sofía (portrayed by Pamela Cervantes), two dancers who strive to achieve their goals while facing various personal challenges. It aired on Canal 5 from 27 July 2026 to 21 August 2026.

== Plot ==
Kevin is a young man from a working-class neighborhood with a hidden talent for dance. He struggles between following in his father's footsteps at their auto repair shop and daring to pursue his true passion: ballet. At a prestigious ballet academy, he meets Ana Sofía, the daughter of the strict director, who was raised to strive for perfection. Although she shines on stage, she hides her desire to live freely, unburdened by her mother's expectations. An immediate connection forms between Kevin and Ana Sofía that goes against their opposite worlds. Together they face social prejudices, internal rivalries, and pressure from those who want to control their lives.

== Cast ==
=== Main ===
- Davi Ulloa as Kevin Briseño
- Pamela Cervantes as Ana Sofía
- Steffy Torres as María Brenda
- Mayte Fernández as Lola
- Nini Pabón as Lorenza
- Mauricio Salas as Cristian
- Facundo Castro as Emiliano
- Maya Tierrablanca as Katia
- Yeyo Maldonado as José Ángel
- Alex Cortés as Junior Copete
- Mateo Trabulsi as Marcelo
- Arturo Viñales as Rogelio Aguilar
- Hugo Alcántara as Tripitas
- Lalo el Mimo as Renato
- Augusto Di Paolo as Clemente
- Miguel Pizarro as Héctor
  - Nahuel Malanot as young Héctor

=== Recurring and guest stars ===
- Lina Durán as Carmina
- Luis Loria as Sergio
- Augusto Di Paolo as Clemente
- Fernando Sagreeb as Braulio
- Patricia Noble as Irma
- Jared Rivera as Yolanda

== Production ==
Filming of the series took place from 22 September 2025 to December 2025. It is the first series of the "M-Drama" block on Canal 5, a format that merges the narrative of telenovelas with the aesthetics and structure of K-dramas.

== Ratings ==
Viewership and ratings per season of Un paso hacia ti
Season	Timeslot (CT)	Episodes	First aired		Last aired		Avg. viewers (millions)
Season	Timeslot (CT)	Episodes	Date	Viewers (millions)	Date	Viewers (millions)	Avg. viewers (millions)
1	Mon–Fri 7:00 p.m.	20	27 July 2026	0.54	21 August 2026	0.69	0.56

== Episodes ==
No.	Title	Original release date	Mexico viewers (millions)
1	"Un cisne fuera del agua"	27 July 2026	0.54
2	"Vender el alma"	28 July 2026	0.65
3	"Hashtag, novios por siempre"	29 July 2026	0.33
4	"Bailar para vivir, vivir para bailar"	30 July 2026	0.33
5	"Plumas en el asfalto"	31 July 2026	0.64
6	"Un beso para volar, unas alas para caminar"	3 August 2026	0.56
7	"¡Kevin es gay!"	4 August 2026	0.56
8	"Fiesta, mentiras y un conejo"	5 August 2026	0.41
9	"Cenizas a las cenizas, zapatillas a las zapatillas"	6 August 2026	0.61
10	"Sufrir con el corazón, soñar con los pies"	7 August 2026	0.60
11	"Pueblo chico, ballet grande"	10 August 2026	0.62
12	"Frágil como un cisne, fuerte como un león"	11 August 2026	0.71
13	"De Ciudad de México a San Petersburgo"	12 August 2026	0.67
14	"Dos cisnes, un beso"	13 August 2026	N/A
15	"La maldad del hechizero Emiliano"	14 August 2026	0.64
16	"Ojos que no ven, zapatillas que no bailan"	17 August 2026	0.39
17	"Zapatero a sus zapatillas"	18 August 2026	N/A
18	"Hasta el cisne canta antes de morir"	19 August 2026	0.46
19	"Bendita bandita"	20 August 2026	0.62
20	"Un lago para soñar, un cisne para amar"	21 August 2026	0.69

== Music ==
Un paso hacia ti (Original Soundtrack)

Soundtrack album / EP by Various artists
- Released: 3 July 2026
- Length: 14:24
- Label: Fonarte Latino

Un paso hacia ti (Original Soundtrack) is the soundtrack to the series. It was released by Fonarte Latino on 3 July 2026.

No.	Title	Writer(s)	Performer(s)	Length
1.	"Un paso hacia ti"	Carlos Lara; Lynda Thomas	Davi Ulloa; Pamela Cervantes	4:05
2.	"Hasta el final"	Lara; Thomas	Pamela Cervantes; Steffy Torres	3:06
3.	"Bailar es mi vida"	Martha Lucía Miranda; Juan Pablo Martínez	Melany Sánchez; Federico Martínez	3:06
4.	"Bom Bom"	Lara	Davi Ulloa; Steffy Torres	4:07
Total length:				14:24
