= W Studios =

Mexican-American television production company, owned by TelevisaUnivision

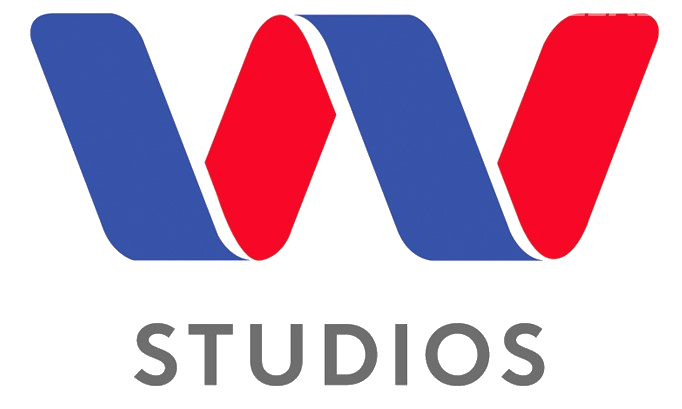
- Company type: Privately held company
- Industry: Production company
- Founded: February 26, 2016; 10 years ago
- Founder: Patricio Wills; Fernando Restrepo Suárez
- Headquarters: Miami, Florida, United States
- Area served: United States; Mexico
- Products: Telenovelas; Television series

W Studios (Wills Studios) is an American production company based in Miami, Florida, founded in 2016 as a joint venture between Univision and Colombian producer Patricio Wills (who worked at the Colombian programadora company RTI Producciones).

== History ==
On February 26, 2016, the Colombian producer Patricio Wills, Fernando Restrepo Suárez and Univision Communications, Inc. (currently TelevisaUnivision), would create a low-cost production company. It was originally created to produce television series and programs for UniMás in the United States and production of series and short formats for Televisa in Mexico.

On March 26, 2016, Carlos Bardasano becomes the Executive Senior Vice President of Content (who was also the Executive Vice President of Original Content of Univision), in turn, the foundation and name of the company is made official.) and being co-produced with the Mexican production company Lemon Films.

On March 5, 2018, Wills becomes the corporate vice president of content, replacing Mexican producer Rosy Ocampo and also becoming president of Televisa Estudios, leaving Carlos Bardasano in charge of W Studios.

In September 2024, Wills announced the separation of W Studios from TelevisaUnivision, regaining complete ownership; however, it was stated that the company would continue to produce content for TelevisaUnivision.

== List of telenovelas and series ==
| # | Year | Production | No. Eps. | First/last aired | Author/creator | Executive producer | Ref. |
|---|---|---|---|---|---|---|---|
2010s
| 1 | 2017 | La piloto | 162 | March 7, 2017 – October 7, 2018 | Jörg Hiller; María Cecilia Boenheim | Patricio Wills (season 1); Carlos Bardasano (season 2) | |
| 2 | 2017 | La fuerza de creer | 7 | September 3, 2017 – January 11, 2019 | Jimena Romero | Patricio Wills | |
| 3 | 2018 | Descontrol | 7 | January 7 – February 4, 2018 | Various | Patricio Wills | |
| 4 | 2018 | La bella y las bestias | 82 | June 12 – September 10, 2018 | Juan Camilo Ferrand | Patricio Wills | |
| 5 | 2018 | Amar a muerte | 82 | November 5, 2018 – March 3, 2019 | Leonardo Padrón | Carlos Bardasano | |
| 6 | 2018 | Las Buchonas | 81 | November 30, 2018 – April 6, 2019 | Andrés López López | Patricio Wills | |
| 7 | 2019 | El Dragón: el regreso de un guerrero | 82 | September 30, 2019 – January 20, 2020 | Arturo Pérez-Reverte | Carlos Bardasano | |
2020s
| 8 | 2020 | Rubí | 27 | January 21 – February 27, 2020 | Leonardo Padrón | Carlos Bardasano | |
| 9 | 2020 | Como tú no hay 2 | 85 | February 24 – June 2, 2020 | Ximena Suárez | Carlos Bardasano | |
| 10 | 2021 | Si nos dejan | 83 | June 1 – October 11, 2021 | Leonardo Padrón | Carlos Bardasano | |
| 11 | 2022 | Los ricos también lloran | 60 | February 21 – May 13, 2022 | Esther Feldman; Rosa Salazar Arenas | Carlos Bardasano | |
| 12 | 2022 | La mujer del diablo | 26 | July 21, 2022 – January 6, 2023 | Leonardo Padrón | Patricio Wills; Carlos Bardasano | |
| 13 | 2022 | Travesuras de la niña mala | 10 | November 8, 2022 – February 2, 2023 | María López Castaño | Patricio Wills; Carlos Bardasano | |
| 14 | 2023 | Pienso en ti | 75 | March 13 – June 23, 2023 | Ximena Suárez | Carlos Bardasano | |
| 15 | 2023 | El gallo de oro | 10 | October 20, 2023 – January 12, 2024 | Lina Uribe; Darío Vanegas | Patricio Wills; Carlos Bardasano | |
| 16 | 2023 | La hora marcada | 9 | October 27, 2023 | Laura Wills Dávila | Patricio Wills; Carlos Bardasano | |
| 17 | 2024 | El extraño retorno de Diana Salazar | 24 | May 17, 2024 – April 11, 2025 | Esther Feldman; Carlos Algara | Patricio Wills; Carlos Bardasano | |
| 18 | 2024 | La historia de Juana | 65 | June 3 – August 30, 2024 | Perla Farías; Verónica Suárez; Basilio Álvarez; Felipe Silva | Patricio Wills | |
| 19 | 2026 | Los encantos del sinvergüenza (Note: Co-production with 11:11 Films) | 20 | April 24, 2026 – present | Rosa Clemente | Patricio Wills | |
