= Casados con hijos (Mexican TV series) =

- Genre: Sitcom
- Based on: Married... with Children by: Michael G. Moye; Ron Leavitt
- Developed by: Gustavo Loza
- Written by: Artús Chávez; Magalli Urquieta; Jacobo Vázquez; Daniel Jiménez
- Directed by: Gustavo Loza
- Starring: Adrián Uribe; Sandra Echeverría
- Composer: Amado López
- Country of origin: Mexico
- Original language: Spanish
- No. of seasons: 2
- No. of episodes: 40

Production
- Executive producers: Gustavo Loza; Alejandro García; Ana Bond
- Producer: Alfredo Marrón Santander
- Editor: Camilo Abadía Tamayo
- Production company: Sony Pictures Television

Original release
- Network: Sony Channel
- Release: 8 May 2024 – present

Casados con hijos is a Mexican sitcom television series based on 1987 American television series Married... with Children. The series stars Adrián Uribe and Sandra Echeverría. It premiered on Sony Channel on 8 May 2024. In September 2024, the series was renewed for a second season that premiered on 11 May 2025. In August 2025, the series was renewed for a third season.

== Cast ==
- Adrián Uribe as Alfonso "Poncho" Olivares
- Sandra Echeverría as Angie Lo
- Luis Arrieta as Esteban "Steve" de la Madrid
- Tamara Niño de Rivera as María de Lourdes "Marilú"
- Val Dorantes as Alexa Olivares
- Maximiliano Najar as Jonathan "Piquilín" Olivares

== Production ==
On 24 May 2023, Adrián Uribe was announced to star in the Mexican adaptation of American sitcom Married... with Children. Filming began on 9 October 2023, with the rest of the main cast being announced. On 12 September 2024, it was announced that filming of the second season had begun. Filming of the third season began on 28 August 2025.

== Episodes ==
Series	Episodes	Originally released	
Series	Episodes	First released	Last released
1	20	8 May 2024	25 September 2024
2	20	11 May 2025	21 September 2025

=== Season 1 (2024) ===
No. overall	No. in season	Title	Original release date
1	1	"Casados con hijos"	8 May 2024
2	2	"¿De quién es la habitación?"	15 May 2024
3	3	"Angie tiene trabajo"	22 May 2024
4	4	"19 años de casados"	29 May 2024
5	5	"Casados sin hijos"	5 June 2024
6	6	"Solovino puede hacerlo"	12 June 2024
7	7	"Poncho se va de la casa"	19 June 2024
8	8	"¿Has manejado un Vocho clásico?"	26 June 2024
9	9	"Ni en mis peores pesadillas"	3 July 2024
10	10	"Extra megas"	17 July 2024
11	11	"Ellas solo quieren divertirse parte 1"	24 July 2024
12	12	"Ellas solo quieren divertirse parte 2"	31 July 2024
13	13	"Cada quien sus problemas"	7 August 2024
14	14	"Nacido para caminar"	14 August 2024
15	15	"Al filo de la navaja"	21 August 2024
16	16	"De Brasil con amor"	28 August 2024
17	17	"Cuestión de amor"	4 September 2024
18	18	"El gran escape"	11 September 2024
19	19	"Padre con dinero"	18 September 2024
20	20	"Los juegos del hambre"	25 September 2024

=== Season 2 (2025) ===
No. overall	No. in season	Title	Original release date
21	1	"La ratonera"	11 May 2025
22	2	"Los Olivares se ponen a dieta"	18 May 2025
23	3	"Cara de póker"	25 May 2025
24	4	"¿Dónde está el dueño?"	1 June 2025
25	5	"Réquem por un peluquero"	8 June 2025
26	6	"El bra favorito de Angie"	15 June 2025
27	7	"El hombre más sano del mundo"	22 June 2025
28	8	"El intercambio"	29 June 2025
29	9	"Comiendo fuera"	6 July 2025
30	10	"Madre querida, madre adorada"	13 July 2025
31	11	"El mirón"	20 July 2025
32	12	"Mi propio baño"	27 July 2025
33	13	"Pelones, pero guapetones"	3 August 2025
34	14	"Poncho vs la cabellera"	10 August 2025
35	15	"Jonathan busca novia"	17 August 2025
36	16	"Poncho ama la literatura"	24 August 2025
37	17	"V' de venganza"	31 August 2025
38	18	"Solovino paga"	7 September 2025
39	19	"Reina de la prepa parte 1"	14 September 2025
40	20	"Reina de la prepa parte 2"	21 September 2025

== Release ==
The series premiered on Sony Channel on 8 May 2024. The second season premiered on 11 May 2025.

In the United States, Vix acquired the exclusive international broadcast rights to the series, making the first half of first season available on 6 September 2024, with the rest of the season being released on 21 February 2025. The second season was released on 5 January 2026.

== Awards and nominations ==
Year	Award	Category	Nominated	Result	Ref
2024	Produ Awards	Best Sitcom	Casados con hijos	Nominated	
2024	Produ Awards	Best Lead Actress - Sitcom	Sandra Echeverría	Won	
2024	Produ Awards	Best Lead Actor - Sitcom	Adrián Uribe	Nominated	
2025	Produ Awards	Best Audiovisual Adaptation Series, Culture	Casados con hijos	Nominated	
