= De noche pero sin sueño =

Mexican late-night talk show

- Genre: Talk show
- Written by: Juan Carlos Castellanos Moreno; Jurgan
- Directed by: Carlos Chavira
- Presented by: Adrián Uribe
- Country of origin: Mexico
- Original language: Spanish
- No. of seasons: 4
- No. of episodes: 34

Production
- Executive producers: Miguel Ángel Fox; Grizeida Roman
- Producer: Cuquis Razo Gómez
- Editors: Nashely Bañuelos Ortiz; Alberto Martínez
- Production company: TelevisaUnivision

Original release
- Network: Univision; Las Estrellas
- Release: 9 October 2022 – present

De noche pero sin sueño is a Mexican late-night talk show hosted by the comedian Adrián Uribe. The series was announced at TelevisaUnivision's upfront for the 2022–2023 television season. The hour-long program premiered first on Univision on 9 October 2022. In Mexico, the program premiered on Las Estrellas on 10 October 2022.

On 11 December 2022, the series was renewed for a second season that premiered on 18 March 2023. The third season premiered on 30 September 2023. The fourth season premiered on 5 April 2024.

== Format ==
The show features a mix of interviews, comedy sketches, musical performances, and entertainment segments. The show's house band is led by Venezuelan model and television host Patricia Zavala.

== Episodes ==
=== Series overview ===
Series	Episodes	Originally released	
Series	Episodes	First released	Last released
1	10	9 October 2022	11 December 2022
2	8	18 March 2023	6 May 2023
3	8	30 September 2023	18 November 2023
4	8	5 April 2024	24 May 2024

=== Season 1 (2022) ===
No. overall	No. in season	Featured guests	U.S. air date	Mexico air date	U.S. viewers (millions)	Mexico viewers (millions)
1	1	"J Balvin, Omar Chaparro"	9 October 2022	10 October 2022	0.94	1.8
2	2	"Luis Fonsi, Angelique Boyer & Sebastián Rulli"	16 October 2022	17 October 2022	1.01	1.6
3	3	"Lele Pons, Galilea Montijo"	23 October 2022	24 October 2022	1.00	1.6
4	4	"Carlos Ponce, Mau y Ricky"	18 December 2022 (Note: In the United States, this episode aired as the season finale.)	31 October 2022	0.72	1.3
5	5	"Gloria Trevi, Julián Gil"	6 November 2022	7 November 2022	0.85	1.4
6	6	"Irina Baeva & Gabriel Soto, Adal Ramones"	13 November 2022	14 November 2022	0.96	N/A
7	7	"Grupo Firme, Miguel Herrera"	20 November 2022	21 November 2022	0.85	1.2
8	8	"Ozuna, Michelle Renaud"	27 November 2022	28 November 2022	0.61	1.1
9	9	"Consuelo Duval, Maná"	4 December 2022	5 December 2022	0.55	1.4
10	10	"Santa Fe Klan, Christian Nodal, El Escorpión Dorado"	11 December 2022	12 December 2022	0.63	1.2

=== Season 2 (2023) ===
No. overall	No. in season	Featured guests	U.S. air date	Mexico air date	U.S. viewers (millions)	Mexico viewers (millions)
11	1	"Maluma"	19 March 2023	18 March 2023	0.77	2.2
12	2	"Ricardo Montaner, Diego Amozurrutia"	26 March 2023	25 March 2023	0.84	2.4
13	3	"Natalia Jiménez, Isaac Hernández"	2 April 2023	1 April 2023	0.67	2.4
14	4	"Albertano, Adriel Favela"	9 April 2023	8 April 2023	0.72	2.2
15	5	"Kimberly Loaiza, Juan De Dios Pantoja"	16 April 2023	15 April 2023	0.75	2.4
16	6	"Juanpa Zurita, Prince Royce, Erick Elías"	23 April 2023	22 April 2023	0.59	2.0
17	7	"Pepe Aguilar, Ana Claudia Talancón"	30 April 2023	29 April 2023	0.77	2.4
18	8	"Alejandra Espinoza, Carlos Rivera"	7 May 2023	6 May 2023	N/A	1.9

=== Season 3 (2023) ===
No. overall	No. in season	Featured guests	U.S. air date	Mexico air date	U.S. viewers (millions)	Mexico viewers (millions)
19	1	"Anitta"	1 October 2023	30 September 2023	0.87	1.6
20	2	"Banda el Recodo, María Becerra"	8 October 2023	7 October 2023	0.85	1.4
21	3	"Don Francisco, Kenia Os, Diego Ruzzarín"	15 October 2023	14 October 2023	0.86	1.5
22	4	"Piso 21, Eduardo Yañez"	22 October 2023	21 October 2023	0.80	1.4
23	5	"Juanes, Menudo"	29 October 2023	28 October 2023	0.91	1.5
24	6	"Ana Bárbara, Manolo Cardona"	5 November 2023	4 November 2023	0.77	1.6
25	7	"Sofía Reyes, Guaynaa, Mauricio Ochmann"	12 November 2023	11 November 2023	0.65	1.8
26	8	"Edén Muñoz, Marjorie de Sousa"	19 November 2023	18 November 2023	0.89	1.4

=== Season 4 (2024) ===
No. overall	No. in season	Featured guests	U.S. air date	Mexico air date	U.S. viewers (millions)
27	1	"Danna Paola, Sandra Echeverría"	7 April 2024	5 April 2024	0.78
28	2	"Ángela Aguilar, Emilio Estefan, Adamari López"	14 April 2024	12 April 2024	0.84
29	3	"Olga Tañón, Ricardo Margaleff"	21 April 2024	19 April 2024	0.67
30	4	"Bárbara de Regil, Los Ángeles Azules"	28 April 2024	26 April 2024	0.76
31	5	"María José, George Harris"	5 May 2024	3 May 2024	0.60
32	6	"Livia Brito, Nebulossa"	9 June 2024	10 May 2024	N/A
33	7	"Edwin Luna, Christopher von Uckermann"	TBA	17 May 2024	TBD
34	8	"Yuridia, Karol Sevilla & Mario Bautista"	16 June 2024	24 May 2024	N/A

== Reception ==
=== U.S. viewers ===
Viewership and ratings per season of De noche pero sin sueño
Season	Timeslot (ET)	Episodes	First aired		Last aired		Avg. viewers (millions)
Season	Timeslot (ET)	Episodes	Date	Viewers (millions)	Date	Viewers (millions)	Avg. viewers (millions)
1	Sunday 10:00 pm	10	9 October 2022	0.94	18 December 2022	0.72	0.82
2	Sunday 10:00 pm	7	19 March 2023	0.77	7 May 2023	N/A	0.73
3	Sunday 9:00 pm	8	1 October 2023	0.87	19 November 2023	0.89	0.82
4	Sunday 9:00 pm	5	7 April 2024	0.78	TBA	TBD	0.73

=== Mexico viewers ===
Viewership and ratings per season of De noche pero sin sueño
Season	Timeslot (CT)	Episodes	First aired		Last aired		Avg. viewers (millions)
Season	Timeslot (CT)	Episodes	Date	Viewers (millions)	Date	Viewers (millions)	Avg. viewers (millions)
1	Monday 11:00 pm	9	10 October 2022	1.8	12 December 2022	1.2	1.40
2	Saturday 11:00 pm	8	18 March 2023	2.2	6 May 2023	1.9	2.24
3	Saturday 11:00 pm	8	30 September 2023	1.6	18 November 2023	1.4	1.53

=== Awards and nominations ===
Year	Award	Category	Nominated	Result	Ref
2023	Produ Awards	Best Interview Program	De noche pero sin sueño	Nominated	
2023	Produ Awards	Best Variety Program Host	Adrián Uribe	Won	
