= Contrato de corazones, tú y yo =

- Also known as: Un nuevo contrato de corazones (season 2)
- Genre: Romantic comedy
- Created by: Carlos Murguía; Eduardo Murguía
- Showrunner: Erika Morales
- Written by: Rodrigo García Anaya; Erika Morales; Indra Villaseñor Amador; Paulina Barros; Kevin Betram; Ana Moreno Hernández; Ricardo Peña Ortiz; Magalli Urquieta Galicia
- Directed by: Bernardo Serna; Robby Chapa; Cristóbal Juárez
- Starring: Farah Justiniani; Samia; Roberto Tello; Luis Orozco; Italivi Orozco; Tristan Maze; Pedro Baldo
- Theme music composer: Jorge Eduardo Murguía; Ricardo Larrea
- Opening theme: "Contrato de corazones" by Moonbelle
- Composers: Eduardo Diazayas; Ricardo Teo Vázquez; Luis Omar Parra Albertos
- Country of origin: Mexico
- Original language: Spanish
- No. of seasons: 1
- No. of episodes: 20

Production
- Executive producers: Carlos Murguía; Eduardo Murguía
- Editors: Carlos Rodríguez; Luis Carlos Delgado Galván; Rodrigo Serrano
- Production company: TelevisaUnivision

Original release
- Network: Canal 5
- Release: 27 October – 24 November 2025
- Network: Las Estrellas

Contrato de corazones, tú y yo (Note: Titled Un nuevo contrato de corazones for the second season.) is a Mexican romantic comedy television series created by Carlos Murguía and Eduardo Murguía. The series follows Feri, a young girl who is passionate about K-Pop and dreams of studying fashion design in South Korea. However, to achieve this, she must first pass various trials, including a contract agreement to maintain a fake relationship with Sebastián, the most handsome and mysterious student at school. It premiered on Canal 5 on 27 October 2025. The series stars Farah Justiniani, Tristan Maze and Pedro Baldo.

In May 2026, the series was renewed for a second season, that is set to premiere on 30 November 2026, moving to Las Estrellas.

== Plot ==
Feri, a scholarship student and influencer from a modest background with dreams of studying fashion design in South Korea, infiltrates an elite high school by posing as wealthy. When Sebastian, the school's handsome and enigmatic golden boy, discovers her secret, he blackmails her into a fake-relationship contract to protect her façade. What begins as a power play and arrangement soon spirals into messy feelings, rivalries (especially when jock Mateo enters the picture), and Feri's struggle to balance ambition, identity and authenticity in a world defined by appearance.

== Cast ==
=== Main ===
- Farah Justiniani as Fernanda "Feri" Yaretzy Guadalupe Reyes
  - Lily Kate as child Feri
- Samia as Yaretzy Reyes
- Roberto Tello as Chuy Guadalupe
- Luis Orozco as Arnulfo
- Italivi Orozco as María Yaretzy Guadalupe Reyes
- Tristan Maze as Sebastián Veraza
- Pedro Baldo as Mateo Villegas

=== Recurring and guest stars ===
- Christian Annocceto as Rafael Villegas
- Jorge Gallegos as Braulio
- Majo Pérez as Lola
- Pepe Olivares as Rufino
- Olaf Velázquez as Martín
- Ivanna González as Pao
- Renzo Arteaga as Ro
- Maryfer Zazueta as Laura
- Zury Sasho as Polo
- Victor Hugo Villanueva as Bru
- Luis Arturo as Salo
- Daniel Santibañez as Benjamín
- Manuel Corta as Andrés Ramos
- Eva Daniela as Fabiola
- Alan Alarcón as Coach Hérnandez
- Ana Luisa Monjarás as Carmen
- Yuriko Londoño as Joon Lee
- Ariadna Jardon as Renata Casasús
- Sussy Lu as Julieta
- Haydeé Navarra as Lorena
- Eduardo Reza as Armando
- Claudia Silva as Greta
- Jonathan Kuri as Crack Sánchez
- Silvia Mendoza as Principal Tello
- David Anguiano as Federico
- Amaya Blas as Eugenia
- Víctor Villanueva as Bru
- Esly as Berenice
- Santiago Valenzuela as Jorgito
- Poker Man as Jean Paul
- Juan Carlos Casasola as Eusebio
- Arena Ibarra as Nancy

== Production ==
Filming of the series began on 3 June 2025, with the working title Amor a la medida. The series is inspired by K-dramas, which have previously aired on Canal 5. On 23 September 2025, Contrato de corazones, tú y yo was announced as the official title of the series.

On 12 May 2026, TelevisaUnivision renewed the series for a second season. Filming of the season took place from 20 August 2026 to 12 November 2026.

== Ratings ==
Viewership and ratings per season of Contrato de corazones, tú y yo
Season	Timeslot (CT)	Episodes	First aired		Last aired		Avg. viewers (millions)
Season	Timeslot (CT)	Episodes	Date	Viewers (millions)	Date	Viewers (millions)	Avg. viewers (millions)
1	Mon–Fri 6:30 p.m.	20	27 October 2025	1.25	24 November 2025	1.17	1.05

== Episodes ==
No.	Title	Original release date	Mexico viewers (millions)
1	"Una artista incomprendida"	27 October 2025	1.25
2	"Tienes que ser mi novia"	28 October 2025	1.15
3	"Prohibido enamorarse"	29 October 2025	1.01
4	"Muchos vestidos, solo una Feri"	30 October 2025	1.02
5	"Pon los pies en la tierra"	31 October 2025	1.08
6	"El castigo"	3 November 2025	1.08
7	"Bandera roja"	4 November 2025	1.08
8	"Me gustas que me duele el corazón"	5 November 2025	0.94
9	"Novia por contrato"	6 November 2025	1.00
10	"Pensé que lo nuestro era real"	7 November 2025	0.90
11	"El Sol sale en días nublados"	10 November 2025	1.03
12	"La culpa es una herida que nunca se cura"	11 November 2025	0.99
13	"Becada y farsante"	12 November 2025	0.92
14	"Una calabaza en vez de princesa"	13 November 2025	1.20
15	"Tiaras de fuego"	14 November 2025	1.07
16	"Las amigas no se traicionan"	17 November 2025	1.07
17	"El legado familiar"	19 November 2025	0.89
18	"Nos alcanzó el destino"	20 November 2025	0.98
19	"Ni que fuera un K-Drama"	21 November 2025	1.11
20	"¡Ya eres famosa!"	24 November 2025	1.17

== Release ==
Contrato de corazones, tú y yo premiered on Canal 5 on 27 October 2025. On 12 November 2026, it was announced that the series would move to Las Estrellas for the second season, that is set to premiere on 30 November 2026.
