= La fuerza de creer =

- Genre: Television series
- Created by: Jimena Romero
- Written by: Jimena Romero (seasons 1-2; 4); Adriana Romero (seasons 1-2); Patricia Rodríguez (season 3); Alejandro Reyes (season 4)
- Directed by: Alfredo Tappan (season 1); Leonardo Galavís (season 2); Emmanuel Duprez (season 3); Charlie Cartaya (season 4)
- Music by: Carlos Marmo (seasons 1-2); Agustín Barreto (season 1); Ricardo Pons (seasons 1-2); Ignacio Pérez Cortés (season 3)
- Country of origin: United States
- Original language: Spanish
- No. of seasons: 4
- No. of episodes: 15

Production
- Executive producers: Patricio Wills (season 1); José Vicente Scheuren (season 2); Genoveva Martínez (season 3); Neha Gohil (season 3); Carolina Rosas (season 3); Anthony Tassi (season 4); Michelle López (season 4); Joy Lorenzo Kenedy (season 4); Jessica Mercer Young (season 4); Carlos Collazo (season 4)
- Producers: Perla Martínez Legorreta (season 1); Alicia Ávila (season 2); Emmanuel Duprez (season 3)
- Editors: Víctor Manuel Ruíz (season 1); Sebastián Elizondo (season 2); Yuri Murúa Beltrán (season 3)
- Camera setup: Multi-camera
- Production companies: W Studios (season 1); Lemon Studios (season 1); Cinemat (season 2); Univision (season 3); Creative Depot (season 4)

Original release
- Network: Univision
- Release: 3 September 2017 – present

La fuerza de creer (English: The Power of Believing) is a Spanish-language television series on Univision on 3 September 2017. The series is written by Jimena Romero and Adriana Romera. The first season is produced by W Studios and Lemon Studios, while the second season is produced by Cinemat. The series tells stories with which the US Hispanics are identified and at the same time offers resources of the empowerment campaign, Pequeños y Valiosos. The fourth season premiered on 24 September 2023.

== Plot ==
=== Season 1 ===
Dr. Roberto López, founder of the Centro de Salud Pública Central, has been serving young patients for three decades, but is considering retirement. His colleague, David Ureña, is a pediatrician who seems to be more concerned with the statistics and financial situation of the center than with improving patient care. This causes him to have conflicts with the most recent member of the team, Dr. Laura Gómez, whose patience, empathy and sensible advice make her very popular among patients despite a disturbing incident from her past. But the income has decreased, the clinic is in danger of closure, and the envious Dr. Ureña blames Dr. Gómez for the changes she made in clinical procedures during his absence. While physicians face declining clinic income and personal challenges, parents continue to take their children to the medical center, where in addition to care, they receive advice on a variety of early childhood development issues, such as ways to encourage cognitive and linguistic development at an early age, the benefits of bilingualism, the importance of parents and other caregivers, socio-emotional health, among others.

=== Season 2 ===
After 25 years as an elementary school teacher, Clara Martinez is found without a job and decides to seek employment at a community center for low-income families teaching English as a second language. Clara begins to discover the problems of the community and the children and families who visit her regularly, and decides to ask the help of her friend Susana López who is a pediatrician and psychologist. Together they embark on a mission to develop a support program for parents and children at the center. But they quickly encounter a major obstacle: commissioner Alfredo Dominguez intends to dismantle the center to sell the land to a private company with plans to build a golf center.

=== Season 3 ===
The season follows Ricardo, a high school senior, who in addition to being overburdened with his student duties, struggles with the decision to participate in an internship at a technology company even though his father asks for his help working in the small family business.

== Cast ==
=== Season 1 ===
- María de la Fuente as Laura Gómez
- Jean Paul Leroux as David Ureña
- Guillermo Quintanilla as Roberto López
- Raquel Garza as Sol
- Ilse Ikeda as Clara
- Raúl Coronado

=== Season 2 ===
- Scarlet Ortiz as Clara Martinez
- Rene Lavan as Mark Riley
- Gabriela Rivero as Berenice
- Daniel Lugo as Rafael
- Sandra Destenave as Susana
- Roberto Escobar as Alfredo Dominguez
- Ana González as Ana
- Ana Terreno as Camila

=== Season 3 ===
- Guillermo Quintanilla as Luis
- Martha Julia as Abigail
- Frances Ondiviela
- Paty Díaz
- Lourdes Reyes as Mrs. Clark
- Víctor Civeira
- Miguel Pizarro as Sam
- Ana Silvia Garza as Gladys
- Alberto Pavón
- Elaine Haro as Katia Suárez
- Jorge Trejo Reyes as Ricardo López
- Daney as Vicente
- Arantza Descalzo as Violeta
- Mario de Jesús as Alex
- Paola Real

=== Season 4 ===
- Martín Brek as Antonio Carrasco
- Wendy Regalado as Santa Carrasco
- Marta González as Altagracia Carrasco
- Karla Peniche as Milagros Carrasco
- Emma Henriquez
- Jerónimo Badillo
- Camilo Chaverra

== Episodes ==
Series	Episodes	Originally released	
Series	Episodes	First released	Last released
1	2	3 September 2017	10 September 2017
2	5	7 January 2019	11 January 2019
3	3	9 January 2022	16 January 2022
4	5	25 September 2023	29 September 2023

=== Season 1 (2017) ===
No. overall	No. in season	Title	Original release date	US viewers (millions)
1	1	"Chapter 1"	3 September 2017	0.72
Dr. Laura Gómez is an idealist pediatrician who joins a public health center. She seeks to listen one by one to her patients and give the best solution to their problems.
2	2	"Chapter 2"	10 September 2017	0.80
Dr. David Urueña blames Dr. Laura Gómez for lowering the clinic's performance with her method. The patients come together to prevent Laura from being fired and to close the clinic because she listens to them and takes care of them.

=== Season 2 (2019) ===
No. overall	No. in season	Title	Original release date
3	1	"Chapter 1"	7 January 2019
Clara arrives at the community center to offer her service as a teacher and ends up helping Berenice and Mark with the day's activities. Clara learns the problems of the children that are taken care of at the community center.
4	2	"Chapter 2"	8 January 2019
Mark encourages Clara and Susana to help him not to lose the community center. Children go through difficult times in their homes and find in the community center a place of learning and fun.
5	3	"Chapter 3"	9 January 2019
Clara becomes the administrator of the community center. Thanks to the teachings of Clara and Susana, the parents of the children begin to understand the needs of their children. Berenice applies new ways of caring for babies.
6	4	"Chapter 4"	10 January 2019
Clara together with her coworkers from the community center begin to develop various workshops for parents and children, as well as reading and writing classes for adults, all in order to prevent the mayor from closing the place.
7	5	"Chapter 5"	11 January 2019
When everything seems lost for the community center, the union of the families of Los Lagos becomes a ray of hope for Clara and her team. The commissioner prepares a news that will change the lives of everyone.

=== Season 3 (2022) ===
No. overall	No. in season	Title	Original release date
8	1	"Chapter 1"	9 January 2022
9	2	"Chapter 2"	9 January 2022
10	3	"Chapter 3"	16 January 2022

=== Season 4: Dulce sazón (2023) ===
No. overall	No. in season	Title	Original release date
11	1	"Chapter 1"	25 September 2023
12	2	"Chapter 2"	26 September 2023
13	3	"Chapter 3"	27 September 2023
14	4	"Chapter 4"	28 September 2023
15	5	"Chapter 5"	29 September 2023

== Webisodes ==
No.	Title	Original release date	Length (minutes)
1	"Webisode 1"	27 August 2017	4:15
The father-son relationship is very important for the growth of children. This webisode teaches that playing and communication are essential for the development of children.
2	"Webisode 2"	8 September 2017	4:37
Viewers learn that it is advisable to talk to your young children in more than one language, since their brain is developing and they learn everything faster. In addition to how important the relationship of grandparents with their grandchildren and bilingualism.
3	"Webisode 3"	15 September 2017	4:34
Viewers discover that many women become depressed after childbirth, this is a common condition but it is important to seek professional help and do activities with your baby.
