= Según Bibi =

- Genre: Sitcom
- Based on: Según Roxi by Julieta Otero
- Written by: Tania Tinajero
- Directed by: Julio Berthely
- Starring: Gicela Sehedi; Felipe Nájera; Isabella Vázquez; Ricardo Crespo; Claudia Cervantes
- Theme music composer: Sergio Jurado; Jorge Jurado
- Opening theme: "Darap" by Mariano Otero
- Country of origin: Mexico
- Original language: Spanish
- No. of seasons: 1
- No. of episodes: 13

Production
- Executive producers: Marisol Mijares; Alex Balassa
- Producer: Lucas Mirvois
- Running time: 21–24 minutes
- Production company: Televisa

Original release
- Network: Las Estrellas
- Release: 31 May – 23 August 2018

Según Bibi is a Mexican sitcom that aired on Las Estrellas from 31 May 2018 to 23 August 2018. Produced by Marisol Mijares and Alex Balassa for Televisa, based on the Argentine series Según Roxi written by Julieta Otero. It stars Gicela Sehedi as the titular character, along with Felipe Nájera, Isabella Vázquez, Ricardo Crespo, and Claudia Cervantes. The first episode of the series was filmed in August 2017.

== Plot ==
Bibi was a carefree and rock girl turned mother. She shares her bed with her partner and four-year-old daughter. Now with her life transformed, Bibi is determined to not be a bad mother, work hard, lose weight, and be happy.

== Cast ==
=== Main ===
- Gicela Sehedi as Bibi, a real estate agent, and funny, neurotic wife without a ring. She was known to be a strong, determined and adventurous woman, but since she became a mother, she drowns in an ibuprofen meter.
- Felipe Nájera as Meme, Bibi's partner and father of Clarita.
- Isabella Vázquez as Clarita, Bibi and Meme's daughter. The little empress of the family.
- Ricardo Crespo as Daniel
- Claudia Cervantes as Ceci

=== Recurring ===
- Mercedes Vaughan as Miss Tita
- Antonio Monroi as Don Beto
- Sonia Couoh as Nancy
- Jimena Guerra as Mami Guerra
- Lorena Del Castillo as Mami Maniqui
- Shakti Urrutia as Mami Tempoz
- Lourdes Gazza as Mami Pedera
- Alejandra Marín as Mami Emprendedora
- Víctor Amaro as Papi Gay Marcelo
- Alejandro Cuétera as Papi Gay Martín
- Isaac Salame as Vendedor de inflables
- Dominika Paleta as Vali

== Episodes ==
No.	Title	Original release date
1	"La peor madre del mundo"	31 May 2018
Bibi, when she goes for her daughter Clarita to school, learns that she has to go dressed as a fairy the next day, starting a whole ordeal trying to get the costume. Guest stars: Irán Castillo as Mami 1, Nora Salinas as Mami 2, Marisol Mijares as Mami 3
2	"El osito bailarín"	7 June 2018
The passion between Bibi and Meme is over, and she has had several failed attempts to revive it. Bibi blames the dancing bear for her total lack of sex, but Vero and Daniel gives them a solution. Guest stars: Alex Marín as Freddy, Paola Díaz as Verónica, Demián Edén as DJ, Alejandro Herrera Bracho as El Pichi, Alex Brizuela as El Gato
3	"El campamento"	14 June 2018
Bibi and Meme are forced to go to the school camp of Baby Harvard, in addition to the high cost, the worst for Bibi is having to support the coordinator, moms and all activities. Guest stars: Yayo Villegas as Checho, Zamia Fandiño as Mami Facilota
4	"La gran mami"	21 June 2018
Clarita is not received at the school because she is sick, while Bibi takes care of her, she falls asleep and dreams that she is a contestant in the contest program called "La gran mami". Guest stars: Claudia Lizaldi as Conductora, Lucero Lander as Monja
5	"Un día feliz"	28 June 2018
Bibi meets Vali, whom she baptizes as "free mommy", and finds in her her twin soul. Under her influence, Bibi lets Clarita go alone to a children's party for the first time and enjoys being free. Guest stars: Benny Emmanuel as Renato
6	"Mami libre"	5 July 2018
Bibi spends a wonderful time with Vali and organizes everything to go to Xochimilco, in full trajinera, Vali finds out that she must leave, leaving Bibi disconsolate to lose her.
7	"Más madre"	12 July 2018
The moms recommend Bibi to a therapist named Rania so that Clarita stops peeing in bed and at school, but the therapy will help Bibi much more than she expects.
8	"La obrita de teatro"	19 July 2018
A play is organized at Baby Harvard, Bibi asks to be the tree, but she fills with anxiety knowing that she will be the protagonist, only the advice of Don Beto and a famous playwright will help her.
9	"Menos Bibi"	26 July 2018
Bibi arrives early at Baby Harvard, she realizes there are no classes. Just when it seems that the situation has dominated, everything goes wrong and she goes with Don Beto to beg him to teach her "less." He agrees to teach her all his knowledge so that everything flows and she calms down.
10	"El parto"	2 August 2018
Clarita questions Bibi about how she came into the world and thanks to Don Beto's tea, she remembers her pregnancy, her delivery and how Magnolia, her mother, helped her throughout the process.
11	"El aniversario"	9 August 2018
Bibi asks her mother for help with Clarita to celebrate her anniversary with Meme, who plans to give her an engagement ring, but what should be the ideal celebration ends in fighting.
12	"La dieta"	16 August 2018
Bibi is at her worst physical and emotional moment, so she spends the weekend locked up with Clarita, until she discovers that her ex, El Gato, is going out with a model and decides to send him a message. He invites her to his next concert and immediately Bibi goes on a diet and decides whom to invite to go with her.
13	"Mami rock"	23 August 2018
Bibi attends the Karmavirus concert. During the concert Bibi feels out of place, until Gato sings her song and begins to feel that it is worth being there. Meme learns that Bibi went to Gato's concert and gets angry. Finally Bibi meets Gato, and everything seems to indicate that the love they had seven years ago is intact.
