= Tu Desayuno Alegre =

Spanish language entertainment television series

- Country of origin: United States
- Original language: Spanish

Production
- Production company: Venevision International

Original release
- Network: Venevision
- Release: 2001 – April 10, 2015

Tu Día Alegre, formerly Tu Desayuno Alegre, is a one-hour daily Spanish language entertainment television series airing on Univision or UniMás depending on the service area. It began its run September 2001 as Tu Desayuno Alegre and was renamed Tu Día Algre in September 2014 with minor format changes including a change in hosts and a four-week change of airtime from 5 am to 10 am. It then returned to its original 5 am time slot. It featured music videos from a wide variety of British, Australian, Canadian, American, music, Latin American music including rap, hip hop, ballads, pop, dance, Bachata, Mexican Cumbia, and traditional Mexican music. The show grew to include multiple recurring segments including fitness, cooking, entertainment news, celebrity interviews, fashion, and lifestyle tips and advice.

== Hosts ==
Valentina Patruno, Anabelle Blum, Mauricio Mejía. Jessica Fox, Carlos Gastellum, and Ximena Córdoba

== Availability ==
Tu Día Alegre was available on Univision or UniMás depending upon the service area and the cable or satellite provider. Some affiliates replaced the program with local news programs. The regular airtime was weekdays at 5 AM. The show was cancelled on April 10, 2015.

== Title translation ==
The adjective "alegre" has several similar but subtly different meanings in English making an exact translation difficult. Tu Desayuno Alegre can translate into Your Happy Breakfast, Your Lighthearted Breakfast or Your Cheerful Breakfast and Tu Día Alegre can translate into Your Happy Day, Your Lighthearted Day, and Your Cheerful Day.
