= La gran sorpresa =

- Genre: Reality television
- Written by: Gabriela Guimarey
- Presented by: Poncho de Anda; Clarissa Molina (season 2)
- Music by: Spirit Music
- Country of origin: United States
- Original language: Spanish
- No. of seasons: 2
- No. of episodes: 12

Production
- Executive producers: Scott Helmstedter; John Padgett; Francois Leroux; Marie Leguizamo; Jeff Androsky; Carol Sherman
- Producer: Andrew T. Scheer
- Production locations: Carnival Cruise Line; Princess Cruises; Holland America Line
- Editors: Johnny Gonzalez; Edgar Marrera
- Camera setup: Multi-camera
- Production companies: Univision Communications; Carnival Corporation & plc; Natural 9 Entertainment

Original release
- Network: Univision (season 1); UniMás (season 2)
- Release: 14 January 2018 – 15 February 2019

La gran sorpresa (English: The Great Surprise) is a Spanish-language reality television series produced by Univision Communications and cruise operator Carnival Corporation & plc. The series premiered on Univision on 14 January 2018. The series then moved to UniMás for its second season, ending on 15 February 2019.

The series surprises several families when they embark on ships from Carnival Cruise Line, Princess Cruises and Holland America Line, and travel to exotic destinations. The series uses the cruise to reunite Latino families who have been separated due to illness, work issues, migration, among other circumstances.

The first season is hosted by Poncho de Anda and various television personalities, including, Karina Banda, Francisca Lachapel, and Ligia Uriarte. In season 2 Poncho de Anda is joined by Clarissa Molina.

== Ratings ==
Viewership and ratings per season of La gran sorpresa
Season	Timeslot (ET)	Episodes	First aired		Last aired		Avg. viewers (millions)
Season	Timeslot (ET)	Episodes	Date	Viewers (millions)	Date	Viewers (millions)	Avg. viewers (millions)
1	Sunday 8:00 pm	6	14 January 2018	1.30	18 February 2018	1.05	1.14
2	Friday 8:00 pm (1–4); Friday 7:00 pm (5 & 6)	6	11 January 2019	0.20	15 February 2019	0.23	0.21

== Episodes ==
=== Series overview ===
Series	Episodes	Originally released		
Series	Episodes	First released	Last released	Network
1	6	14 January 2018	18 February 2018	Univision
2	6	11 January 2019	15 February 2019	UniMás

=== Season 1 (2018) ===
No. overall	No. in season	Title	Original release date	US viewers (millions)
1	1	"Amantes a distancia"	14 January 2018	1.30
Janet González plans a surprise for her mother Bertha, who arrived in the United States five years prior, while battling cancer. In addition, there are surprises when Bertha reunites with relatives she has not seen in years, including her husband.
2	2	"Héroes de los huracanes"	21 January 2018	1.28
When Hurricane Harvey hit the Houston, Texas area, Sergio Escobedo and his family came to the rescue. Stuck in the dangerous waters of the flood, they opened their church to the victims. Now, after working tirelessly for many years for his family and community, Sergio and his wife go on a cruise on board the Carnival Vista. The family will be surprised with a reunion with loved ones, among them, a brother from Monterrey, Mexico, whom Sergio has not seen for more than 20 years.
3	3	"La celebración de la vida"	28 January 2018	1.13
After years fighting against cancer, Yon Jairo and Patricia Serna are about to embark on an enriching cruise organized by Yon Jairo's sister, Nubia. For 10 years, distance has separated Yon Jairo from his mother, who lives in Medellín, Colombia and faces Alzheimer's. Yon has no idea that Nubia is planning a family reunion with her.
4	4	"Nuevo regreso"	4 February 2018	0.95
After leaving a troubled marriage, Maribel Lara left aside her love life to work day and night and thus offer a good home to her five children. Maribel's daughter, Janet, now an adult, wants to thank her mother with an unforgettable trip for all the sacrifices she made and help her feel more confident in herself. Maribel, after not seeing her sister for 15 years, will be reunited with her.
5	5	"Un sueño hecho realidad"	11 February 2018	1.11
As a single mother, Rosario Fox made the most difficult decision of her life by having to leave her son with her sister to travel to the United States in search of a better life. When she earned enough money, Rosario took her son Juan Blásquez to live with her in Milwaukee and she worked hard to raise him alone in a very small apartment. Juan, now an adult, wants to thank Rosario for all her sacrifices and decides to take her on a vacation on board Carnival Vista. The cruise turns out to be much more than what Rosario could ever hope for since she is reunited with relatives she had not seen in many years.
6	6	"Mejor juntos"	18 February 2018	1.05
Roberto and Margarita Betancourt were happily married in El Salvador, with five daughters and two sons, until their family business almost went bankrupt. To avoid overwhelming their parents, the Betancourt children found a painful solution to this serious problem. They separated and moved to Mexico City, Bogota, Alabama, Los Angeles and Australia. Gabriella, one of the daughters, knows that, although her siblings are scattered around six cities of the world, they remain united in the heart and hopes to reunite the whole family once again.

=== Season 2 (2019) ===
No. overall	No. in season	Title	Original release date	US viewers (millions)
7	1	"Puerto Rico 1"	11 January 2019	0.20
Amneris López, a pediatric oncology nurse from San Juan, Puerto Rico lost everything in Hurricane Maria. She lost her job and had to move to Tennessee with her husband and son. However, due to economic limitations and the language barrier, Amneris has not been able to obtain her license to practice as a nurse in her new community. Poncho and Clarissa will give them the surprise of their life with an incredible cruise.
8	2	"Alaska"	18 January 2019	0.17
The Adame family decides to give a great surprise to Silvia, the woman who has put all her heart into improving and supporting her loved ones to keep them together.
9	3	"Mediterráneo 2"	25 January 2019	0.22
The Pimentel family will meet again and spend the most unforgettable moments seeing new places and remembering old times.
10	4	"Puerto Rico 2"	1 February 2019	0.22
The Rodriguez family will be rewarded for all the good deeds they have done with a series of surprises and an unexpected trip.
11	5	"Nueva Inglaterra"	8 February 2019	0.20
The Martinez sisters lived an unforgettable experience aboard a cruise ship that will fulfill all their dreams and relive great memories.
12	6	"Mediterráneo 1"	15 February 2019	0.23
The Salcedo family receives the most beautiful surprise with a trip full of love, excitement, encounters and happy moments that they will share with their loved ones.

=== Special ===
No.	Title	Original release date	Viewers (millions)
1	"Especial de Navidad"	22 December 2018	0.49
Poncho de Anda starts a new trip aboard the Carnival Horizon with a Christmas Special. Poncho together with Clarissa Molina seek to fulfill the dreams of Latino families and will remember the most emotional moments of the first season.
