= Contacto Deportivo =

American Spanish-language sports program

Contacto Deportivo is an American Spanish-language sports news program. Previously airing on UniMas, the program airs nightly at midnight on Univision and Univision Deportes Network.

In September 2015, Univision Communications announced that according to Nielsen ratings, Contacto Deportivo was the fastest-growing U.S. sports news program in terms of viewership, regardless of language, having increased its year over year viewership by 213%, and 18-49 viewership by 170%. It was also reported that in July and August 2015, average viewership of Contacto Deportivo was 5% higher than that of the 12:00 a.m. ET edition of ESPN's English-language sports news program SportsCenter—its main competitor in the timeslot.
