= ¡Siéntese quién pueda! =

American television talk show

- Also known as: Grab a seat if you can!
- Genre: Talk show
- Presented by: Jorge Bernal; Chiquibaby
- Country of origin: United States
- Original language: Spanish

Production
- Production company: We Love Entertainment

Original release
- Network: UniMás
- Release: August 22, 2022 – May 19, 2023
- Network: Univision
- Release: May 22, 2023 – present

¡Siéntese quién pueda! (English: Grab a seat if you can!) is an American television talk show that premiered on UniMás on August 22, 2022. On May 22, 2023, the show moved to sister network Univision. The current lineup of hosts consists of Jorge Bernal and Chiquibaby.

== Premise ==
The shows original format consisted of a panel of journalists, television personalities, and social media talent competing against each other as they exchanged opinions and conversations about events, celebrity news, and pop culture. Each week, audiences at home would vote online on which panelist they disagreed with the most. As a penalty, the panelist would be asked to leave the studio and could only return after fulfilling the task of finding exclusive news to present on the show. This format was eventually dropped when the program moved to Univision and it became a general overview of news throughout the entertainment industry.

== Hosts ==
- Jorge Bernal (2024–present)
- Chiquibaby (2023–present)
- Julián Gil (2022-2023)

== Broadcast ==
The series premiered on UniMás on August 22, 2022. From May 1 to May 5, 2023, an "extra" edition of the program aired on Univision. Due to the success of the extra edition, the show permanently moved to Univision on May 22, 2023.
