= Te doy la vida (Mexican TV series) =

Mexican telenovela

- Genre: Telenovela
- Created by: María José Galleguillos
- Based on: Te doy la vida by María José Galleguillos
- Written by: Edwin Valencia; Lucero Suárez; Carmen Sepúlveda; Luis Reynoso
- Directed by: Sergio Cataño; Nelhiño Acosta
- Creative director: Rogelio Croda
- Theme music composer: Eduardo Murguía; Leonel García; Mauricio Arriaga
- Opening theme: "Te doy la vida" by Leonel García
- Ending theme: "Te doy la vida" by Jorge Domínguez
- Composer: Israel Jurado
- Country of origin: Mexico
- Original language: Spanish
- No. of seasons: 1
- No. of episodes: 82

Production
- Executive producer: Lucero Suárez
- Producer: Ángel Villaverde
- Production location: Mexico City, Mexico
- Cinematography: Víctor Soto; Adrián Frutos Maza
- Editors: Mauricio Cortés; Norma Ramírez
- Camera setup: Multi-camera
- Production company: Televisa

Original release
- Network: Las Estrellas
- Release: 23 March – 12 July 2020

Te doy la vida (English title: Giving Up My Life) is a Mexican telenovela that premiered on Las Estrellas on 23 March 2020. The series is produced by Lucero Suárez for Televisa, is an adaptation of the Chilean telenovela of the same name written by María José Galleguillos. It stars José Ron, and Eva Cedeño.

== Plot ==
Nicolás (Leonardo Herrera) is a six-year-old boy suffering from leukemia and is in need of a bone marrow transplant to recover. In such a situation, the adoptive parents of the child, Elena (Eva Cedeño) and Ernesto (Jorge Salinas) will take on the task of searching for Nicolas' biological father. Thus, they arrive at the mechanical workshop where Pedro (José Ron) works to expose the situation, at which point the young man learns that he had a son from a past relationship.

== Cast ==
=== Main ===
An extensive cast list was published in October 2019 by the website Mastelenovelas.

- José Ron as Pedro Garrido, is a mechanic passionate about football.
- Eva Cedeño as Elena Villaseñor, is a woman who will fight to take care of her son.
- César Évora as Nelson López
- Erika Buenfil as Andrea Espinoza
- Nuria Bages as Ester Salazar
- Omar Fierro as Horacio Villaseñor
- Luz María Aguilar as Isabel
- Danny Perea as Gina López
- Ricardo Margaleff as Agustín "Agus" Preciado, Pedro's best friend.
- Óscar Bonfiglio as Domingo Garrido
- Camila Selser as Irene Villaseñor
- Ara Saldívar as Gabriela Villaseñor
- Ramsés Alemán as Samuel Garrido
- Arturo Carmona as Comandante Robles
- Miguel Ángel Biaggio as Modesto Flores
- Gloria Sierra as Mónica del Villar
- Dayren Chávez as Rosa García
- Mauricio Abularach as Jimmy
- José Manuel Lechuga as Chano
- Octavio Ocaña as Benito Rangel
- Hugo Macías Macotela as Mariano
- Rocío de Santiago as Inés
- Marcela Salazar as Bernardina
- Santiago González as Dr. Vega
- Sachi Tamashiro as Vicky
- Leo Herrera as Nicolás Rioja
- Jorge Salinas as Ernesto Rioja, is a man who has a very high ego and is manipulative.

=== Recurring ===
- Luis Antonio Aguilar
- Sofía Vanni
- Lourdes Cobo

== Ratings ==
=== Mexico ratings ===
Viewership and ratings per season of Te doy la vida
| Season | Timeslot (CT) | Episodes | First aired | | Last aired | | Avg. viewers (millions) |
| Season | Timeslot (CT) | Episodes | Date | Viewers (millions) | Date | Viewers (millions) | Avg. viewers (millions) |
|---|---|---|---|---|---|---|---|
| 1 | Mon–Fri 6:30pm | 81 | 23 March 2020 | 3.3 | 12 July 2020 | 5.1 | 3.62 |

=== U.S. ratings ===
Viewership and ratings per season of Te doy la vida
| Season | Timeslot (ET) | Episodes | First aired | | Last aired | | Avg. viewers (millions) |
| Season | Timeslot (ET) | Episodes | Date | Viewers (millions) | Date | Viewers (millions) | Avg. viewers (millions) |
|---|---|---|---|---|---|---|---|
| 1 | Mon–Fri 8pm/7c | 82 | 13 April 2020 | 1.79 | 3 August 2020 | 2.12 | 1.77 |

== Episodes ==
| No. | Title | Mexico air date | U.S. air date | Mexico viewers (millions) | U.S. viewers (millions) |
|---|---|---|---|---|---|
| 1 | "¡Ya tenemos donador!" | 23 March 2020 (Note: Premiered early online through Las Estrellas website on 20 March 2020.) | 13 April 2020 | 3.3 | 1.79 |
Ernesto and Elena search for Nico's birth mother, but they find Pedro, who, although he doesn't think he is his father, takes a DNA test.
| 2 | "¡No se acerquen a el!" | 24 March 2020 | 14 April 2020 | 3.6 | 1.87 |
Ernesto is upset to see that Esther wants to meet her grandson, so he demands that Pedro not have any type of relationship with his son.
| 3 | "Pedro no deja de pensar en Elena" | 25 March 2020 | 15 April 2020 | 3.1 | 1.70 |
Pedro doesn't know if he has feelings for Elena. Ernesto is afraid of losing Nicolás's affection. Gina meets Elena.
| 4 | "Nuestro hijo está luchando por vivir" | 26 March 2020 | 16 April 2020 | 3.3 | 1.76 |
Nico feels sick after receiving chemotherapy; Pedro asks him to keep fighting. Elena is very distressed about her son's health.
| 5 | "Este no es el hombre del que me enamoré" | 27 March 2020 | 17 April 2020 | 3.2 | 1.70 |
Elena does not understand Ernesto's reaction to Pedro's help. Nico gets worse and Gina gets jealous when she sees Pedro and Elena together.
| 6 | "¡Mi hijo va a vivir!" | 30 March 2020 | 20 April 2020 | 2.8 | 1.74 |
The bone marrow transplant is successful and Nico's health improves. Elena proposes to Ernesto to make a truce for the sake of her son and Pedro breaks up with Gina.
| 7 | "Pedro le confiesa sus sentimientos a Elena" | 31 March 2020 | 21 April 2020 | 3.5 | 1.82 |
Elena thanks Pedro for what he did for Nico, but he tells her that he doesn't stop thinking about her. Irene intrigues against Elena and Gina kisses Pedro.
| 8 | "El noveno mandamiento" | 1 April 2020 | 22 April 2020 | 3.1 | 1.68 |
Pedro doesn't stop thinking about Elena and she could also feel something for him. Ernesto swears that Pedro will not be able to separate him from his family.
| 9 | "Ernesto confronta a Pedro por visitar a Nico" | 2 April 2020 | 23 April 2020 | 3.3 | 1.67 |
Ernesto pushes Pedro when he sees that he was with Nico; Elena tells Pedro to leave the hospital. Gina and Pedro get back together and Andrea insists on finding a partner for Monica.
| 10 | "Ernesto teme perder a la gente que ama" | 3 April 2020 | 24 April 2020 | 3.4 | 1.60 |
Ernesto suffers when he sees his mother deteriorated. Pedro and Gina set the wedding date. Nico finally leaves the hospital.
| 11 | "Este triunfo va por ti campeón" | 6 April 2020 | 27 April 2020 | 3.3 | 1.77 |
Nico and Pedro are in the tuning contest. Pedro meets with Elena to talk to her and Irene tells Ernesto to cause a problem.
| 12 | "Ni creas que te voy a dejar libre" | 7 April 2020 | 28 April 2020 | 3.1 | 1.70 |
Ernesto claims Elena for seeing Pedro and tells her that he no longer trusts her. Gina is also jealous of Elena and Doña Isabel has a crisis.
| 13 | "Nuestro tiempo de estar juntos de acabo" | 8 April 2020 | 29 April 2020 | 3.4 | 1.64 |
Horacio files for divorce from Andrea. Ernesto lets Nico see Pedro; he dreams that he kisses Elena.
| 14 | "Ernesto le tiende una trampa a Pedro" | 9 April 2020 | 30 April 2020 | 3.0 | 1.57 |
Nico and Pedro meet again, but Ernesto prepares a surprise for Pedro. Andrea finds Horacio kissing Monica and confronts them.
| 15 | "Pedro es detenido por robo de infante" | 10 April 2020 | 1 May 2020 | 2.7 | 1.59 |
The police arrest Pedro. Elena demands Ernesto withdraw the lawsuit. Gina blames Elena for everything that happened. Pedro and Ernesto face each other.
| 16 | "¡Pedro y Elena se besan!" | 13 April 2020 | 4 May 2020 | 3.1 | 1.77 |
Elena hugs Pedro when she sees him free and he kisses her. Elena tells Irene what happened, but Irene reveals the secret to Ernesto to separate them.
| 17 | "Lo nuestro sucedió a destiempo" | 14 April 2020 | 5 May 2020 | 3.2 | 1.62 |
Elena tells Pedro that she cannot be with him and that he should no longer see Nico. Ernesto, Elena and Nico decide to go to Houston.
| 18 | "Pedro teme haber perdido a Nico para siempre" | 15 April 2020 | 6 May 2020 | 3.6 | 1.81 |
Pedro cries knowing that he will never see Nico again. Andrea wants to strip Horacio of his company and Irene tells Pedro that Elena loves him.
| 19 | "¡No puedo casarme contigo" | 16 April 2020 | 7 May 2020 | 3.3 | 1.68 |
Elena suffers knowing that Pedro is getting married that day, but he tells Gina at the altar that he cannot unite his life with her.
| 20 | "¡Te voy a matar!" | 17 April 2020 | 8 May 2020 | 3.1 | 1.61 |
Gina blames Elena that Pedro rejects her and assaults her. Ernesto, Elena and Nico arrive in Houston. Gina sleeps with Agustín out of spite.
| 21 | "Pedro me las va a pagar" | 20 April 2020 | 11 May 2020 | 3.3 | 1.65 |
Gina swears she will make Pedro suffer. Ernesto thinks Elena is lying to him and Nelson fires Domingo from the workshop.
| 22 | "Gina finge suicidarse" | 21 April 2020 | 12 May 2020 | 3.2 | 1.76 |
Gina makes Nelson believe that she took several pills. Pedro gets a new job and Andrea is discovered by Gaby and Irene.
| 23 | "No pude con tu desprecio" | 22 April 2020 | 13 May 2020 | 3.0 | 1.65 |
Gina tries to blame Pedro for what she did, but he assures her that he will not get back together with her. Elena decides to give Ernesto a new opportunity.
| 24 | "¡Gina está embarazada!" | 23 April 2020 | 14 May 2020 | 3.3 | 1.78 |
Gina discovers that she is expecting a baby from Agustín. Ernesto tells Elena that they must continue to stay in Houston. Andrea decides to make life impossible for Horacio.
| 25 | "Este bebé va a ser de Pedro" | 24 April 2020 | 15 May 2020 | 3.3 | 1.61 |
Gina will use her pregnancy to make Pedro stay with her. Horacio cancels Andrea's accounts, Elena and Pedro meet again.
| 26 | "Elena piensa divorciarse de Ernesto" | 27 April 2020 | 18 May 2020 | 3.3 | 1.74 |
Pedro agrees to take responsibility for the baby Gina is expecting. Elena tells Ernesto that she plans to separate from him.
| 27 | "No puedo vivir sin ti" | 28 April 2020 | 19 May 2020 | 3.2 | 1.76 |
Pedro looks for Elena to tell her that he loves her and they kiss. Gina suggests Ernesto join forces with her to separate Pedro and Elena.
| 28 | "Nuestro tiempo se acabó" | 29 April 2020 | 20 May 2020 | 3.3 | 1.66 |
Elena tells Ernesto that they no longer have a chance to be happy. Pedro swears that he will fight for Elena and that he will wait for her the necessary time.
| 29 | "¡Nico se está poniendo mal!" | 30 April 2020 | 21 May 2020 | 2.9 | 1.71 |
Elena and Ernesto worry about Nico's health; the little one looks for Pedro for comfort, but Ernesto does not take the action well.
| 30 | "Nico descubre que es adoptado" | 1 May 2020 | 22 May 2020 | 3.0 | 1.62 |
Elena and Ernesto fight and Nico hears them say that he is not their real son. Domingo explodes against his family and Esther believes he has a lover.
| 31 | "Nico rechaza a Elena por culpa de Ernesto" | 4 May 2020 | 22 May 2020 | 3.2 | 1.62 |
Ernesto tells Nico that Elena never wanted to tell him the truth of his adoption. Elena, upon learning, despises him and asks for a divorce.
| 32 | "¡Nico esta bien!" | 5 May 2020 | 25 May 2020 | 3.3 | 1.67 |
The doctor informs Elena that there is no damage to Nico's organs. Horacio breaks his partnership with Ernesto. Gaby and Samuel kiss.
| 33 | "Ernesto droga a Elena" | 6 May 2020 | 26 May 2020 | 3.5 | 1.63 |
Ernesto gets the drug to keep Elena asleep. Gina pays to deceive Pedro on the ultrasound and Rosa is kidnapped.
| 34 | "¿Piensas que soy una cualquiera?" | 7 May 2020 | 27 May 2020 | 3.8 | 1.55 |
Due to the drug Ernesto gives her, Elena becomes aggressive towards Pedro. Esther tells Domingo to leave when she discovers that he is supposedly gay.
| 35 | "Elena y Nico sufren un grave accidente" | 8 May 2020 | 28 May 2020 | 3.6 | 1.54 |
Elena drives upset because of the drug and puts Nico at risk. Esther discovers that Domingo sees Nico and Andrea starts a new business.
| 36 | "Elena entra en coma" | 11 May 2020 | 29 May 2020 | 3.7 | 1.62 |
Elena convulses in the hospital. Pedro insists on seeing her, but Ernesto confronts him. Horacio discovers Domingo's true identity.
| 37 | "Irene toma el lugar de Elena en la vida de Nico y Ernesto" | 12 May 2020 | 1 June 2020 | 3.5 | 1.71 |
Irene takes advantage of Elena's illness to get into Ernesto and Nico's house; She offers his support, and incidentally, uses Elena's belongings.
| 38 | "¡Elena despierta de coma!" | 13 May 2020 | 2 June 2020 | 3.5 | 1.80 |
Pedro visits Elena just when she wakes up from the coma. Jimmy threatens Ernesto and Domingo discovers that Nelson invented the rumor of his infidelity.
| 39 | "Mi vida sin ti no tiene sentido" | 14 May 2020 | 3 June 2020 | 3.6 | 1.68 |
Ernesto tells Elena that he misses her, but she speaks to Pedro to tell him that he is the love of her life. Esther learns that Nelson loves her deeply.
| 40 | "Si te divorcias, te quito a Nicolás" | 15 May 2020 | 4 June 2020 | 3.6 | 1.73 |
Elena leaves the house, but Ernesto blackmails her to return to his side. Irene confesses her feelings to Ernesto and they make love.
| 41 | "No tengo otra salida" | 18 May 2020 | 5 June 2020 | 3.5 | 1.73 |
Elena agrees to return with Ernesto to prevent him from taking Nico; Pedro is furious. Commander Robles visits Ernesto.
| 42 | "Gina y Ernesto unen fuerzas contra Pedro y Elena" | 19 May 2020 | 5 June 2020 | 3.3 | 1.73 |
Gina discovers that Ernesto drugged Elena with the medicine he got from Jimmy and blackmails him, but he takes the opportunity to make a pact.
| 43 | "Pedro y Elena hacen el amor" | 20 May 2020 | 8 June 2020 | 3.4 | 1.65 |
Pedro rents an apartment to see Elena and when she arrives, they indulge in passion. Ernesto requires Gina to follow Pedro.
| 44 | "Ernesto le tiende una trampa a Horacio" | 21 May 2020 | 9 June 2020 | 3.9 | 1.63 |
Ernesto gets Horacio to sign some papers that will make him accused of fraud. Esther finally meets Nico and Gina finds Pedro's apartment.
| 45 | "Te vas a arrepentir" | 22 May 2020 | 10 June 2020 | 3.5 | 1.66 |
Ernesto finds Elena and Pedro in bed, records them and threatens Elena with taking Nico away.
| 46 | "Pedro termina con Elena" | 25 May 2020 | 11 June 2020 | 3.4 | 1.66 |
Ernesto agrees to give Elena a divorce and forces Pedro to separate from her so that she can get Nico back.
| 47 | "Nadie te va a querer más que yo" | 26 May 2020 | 12 June 2020 | 3.2 | 1.47 |
Ernesto threatens Irene with revealing their relationship if she betrays him; Irene swears allegiance to him. Elena looks for Pedro to explain why he broke up with her.
| 48 | "Pedro le pide matrimonio a Gina" | 27 May 2020 | 15 June 2020 | 3.5 | 1.63 |
Pedro complies with Ernesto's threats and asks Gina to get married as soon as possible; Elena decides to go on with her life.
| 49 | "No quiero que le desgracies la vida" | 28 May 2020 | 16 June 2020 | 3.2 | 1.78 |
Pedro and Gina set the wedding date, but Agustín confronts Pedro and reveals that he is in love with Gina.
| 50 | "¡Pedro se casa con Gina!" | 29 May 2020 | 17 June 2020 | 3.4 | 1.80 |
Pedro and Gina contract nuptials at the city council and organize a party in the workshop. Horacio and Andrea finally divorce.
| 51 | "Deseo que seamos una linda familia" | 1 June 2020 | 18 June 2020 | 3.5 | 1.60 |
Elena finds out that Pedro got married. Gina wants to iron out rough edges with Esther, but Pedro claims her for sending Elena the wedding photos.
| 52 | "Modesto secuestra a Samuel" | 2 June 2020 | 19 June 2020 | 3.3 | 1.71 |
Modesto discovers the trap of Rosa and Samuel, and decides to take revenge. Pedro rejects Gina when he learns that she sent the photos to Elena.
| 53 | "Maldita la hora en que me enamoré de ti" | 3 June 2020 | 22 June 2020 | 4.1 | 1.89 |
Pedro tries to fix things with Elena, but she claims him for his betrayal. Samuel manages to escape. Ernesto plans to get rid of Pedro.
| 54 | "Ernesto manda a matar a Pedro" | 4 June 2020 | 23 June 2020 | 3.6 | 1.83 |
Ernesto pays Jimmy to eliminate Pedro from his path. Nico meets Gina and her grandmother Isabel. Monica is pregnant.
| 55 | "¿Tú qué tienes que ver con Ernesto?" | 5 June 2020 | 24 June 2020 | 3.8 | 1.96 |
Elena confronts Irene upon hearing her speak to Ernesto. Pedro asks Gina to give him a chance. Jimmy suffers a serious accident.
| 56 | "¿Estas conmigo o contra de mi?" | 8 June 2020 | 25 June 2020 | 3.9 | 1.80 |
Gina discovers that Ernesto ordered Pedro to be killed and threatens to report him, but he has other plans. Jimmy could be paralyzed.
| 57 | "Ya se que el hijo que esperas no es de Pedro" | 9 June 2020 | 26 June 2020 | 4.1 | 1.75 |
Nelson confronts Gina knowing that the baby is not Pedro's. Ernesto tries to kill Jimmy and Elena files for divorce.
| 58 | "Tu mamá se enamoró de otro hombre" | 10 June 2020 | 29 June 2020 | 3.9 | 1.89 |
Nico despises Elena knowing that she wants to divorce; Ernesto puts ideas into his head. Esther tells Elena that Pedro broke up with Gina.
| 59 | "Eres una porquería" | 11 June 2020 | 30 June 2020 | 3.9 | 1.84 |
Elena confronts Ernesto for inventing Horacio's fraud and asks Pedro for forgiveness for having doubted him.
| 60 | "Ernesto le dice a Nico que Pedro es su padre biológico" | 12 June 2020 | 1 July 2020 | 3.5 | 1.77 |
The police prevent Elena from approaching her son and Ernesto reveals to Nico that Pedro is the father who abandoned him at birth.
| 61 | "Tarde o temprano, Ernesto va a caer" | 15 June 2020 | 2 July 2020 | 3.9 | 1.77 |
Elena is taken to the mayor's office and Nico despises Pedro; Horacio will help them to end Ernesto's evil. Jimmy asks Pedro to take care of Gina.
| 62 | "¡Pedro deja a Gina!" | 16 June 2020 | 3 July 2020 | 4.1 | 1.66 |
Pedro leaves home knowing that Gina was an accomplice of Ernesto. Pedro and Elena are hoping to get Nico back.
| 63 | "¡Agustín es el padre del hijo que espera Gina!" | 17 June 2020 | 6 July 2020 | 4.3 | 1.94 |
Nelson dismisses Agustín from the workshop, but Rosa defends him by confessing to Nelson that he is the father of Gina's baby.
| 64 | "¡Nico, Pedro y Elena se reencuentran!" | 18 June 2020 | 7 July 2020 | 4.1 | 1.79 |
Thanks to Pedro's plan, Nico and Elena hug each other again with love; She explains that Pedro never abandoned him. Pedro wins the tuning contest.
| 65 | "¡Elena regresa con Ernesto!" | 19 June 2020 | 8 July 2020 | 4.1 | 2.01 |
Elena agrees to return to the house with Ernesto and asks Pedro not to look for her anymore. Nico and Pedro become friends again.
| 66 | "Ernesto le demuestra a Elena el amor que le tiene" | 22 June 2020 | 9 July 2020 | 4.0 | 1.85 |
Ernesto lifts the restraining order against Elena and agrees to make a pact with Horacio to fix the family relationship.
| 67 | "Elena descubre la verdadera identidad de Ernesto" | 23 June 2020 | 10 July 2020 | 3.9 | 1.90 |
Commander Robles informs Elena and Horacio who Ernesto really is. Modesto is arrested and Andrea knows Gina's secret.
| 68 | "Domingo sufre un infarto" | 24 June 2020 | 13 July 2020 | 4.4 | 1.92 |
Domingo hears Gina say that Pedro is not the father of her baby and she passes out. Commander Rojas is about to get proof against Ernesto.
| 69 | "¡Yo lo maté!" | 25 June 2020 | 14 July 2020 | 4.4 | 1.93 |
Gina blames herself for Domingo's death and in her madness confesses to Pedro the truth about her baby.
| 70 | "No quiero volver a verte" | 26 June 2020 | 15 July 2020 | 3.9 | 2.11 |
Pedro despises Gina and tells her to leave the house; Esther lovingly hugs Gina, but she is unable to tell her the truth.
| 71 | "Eres igual de falso que Gina" | 29 June 2020 | 17 July 2020 | 4.2 | 1.73 |
Esther confronts Nelson upon learning of Gina's deception. Agustín discovers that he is the father of the baby and Gaby listens to Irene speak to Ernesto.
| 72 | "Mi propia hermana me traicionó" | 30 June 2020 | 20 July 2020 | 4.5 | 1.89 |
Elena finds out that Irene and Ernesto are lovers. Inés decides to return to the congregation and Gina begins labor.
| 73 | "No tengo instinto materno" | 1 July 2020 | 21 July 2020 | 4.2 | 1.93 |
Gina gives birth to a girl, but rejects her for not being Pedro's daughter. Ernesto finds the evidence of the trap Elena is preparing for him.
| 74 | "¡Queda usted detenida!" | 2 July 2020 | 22 July 2020 | 4.0 | 1.96 |
Elena is arrested for trying to take Nico away and pleads guilty in order to save Pedro. Andrea discovers Irene's betrayal.
| 75 | "Elena es trasladada a prisión" | 3 July 2020 | 23 July 2020 | 4.0 | 1.94 |
Elena suffers from being away from Nico; Pedro swears that he will help her be free. Irene pretends to have been used by Ernesto.
| 76 | "Nico escapa de Ernesto" | 6 July 2020 | 24 July 2020 | 4.3 | 1.76 |
Nico and Ernesto go to play in the park and in an oversight of Ernesto, Nico takes advantage to run away from his dad. Elena has a prison fight.
| 77 | "¿Dónde está Nico?" | 7 July 2020 | 27 July 2020 | 4.7 | 1.86 |
Nico runs away from Ernesto to look for Pedro, but he gets lost; everyone is desperately looking for him.
| 78 | "¡Elena es libre!" | 8 July 2020 | 28 July 2020 | 4.6 | 2.12 |
Elena is released from prison on bail and is reunited with Pedro; Nico finally appears and rejects Ernesto for what he did to his mother.
| 79 | "Sin ti mi vida no tiene sentido" | 9 July 2020 | 29 July 2020 | 4.8 | 2.01 |
Elena and Nico meet again, but a social worker informs them that neither she nor Ernesto are fit to care for the little boy.
| 80 | "Ernesto le pide perdón a Elena" | 10 July 2020 | 30 July 2020 | 4.2 | 2.01 |
Ernesto is desperate to see Nico and apologizes to Elena for the damage done; Robles already has the evidence of the usurpation of Miguel Hernández.
| 81 | "Ernesto huye de la justicia" | 12 July 2020 | 31 July 2020 3 August 2020 | 5.1 | 2.00 2.12 |
| 82 | "Te doy mi vida" | 12 July 2020 | 31 July 2020 3 August 2020 | 5.1 | 2.00 2.12 |
Thanks to Irene, Ernesto manages to escape from the police. Gina abandons Maria and Nico calls Pedro dad. Pedro, Elena and Nico travel to Italy for the competition to design an electric car; the three will celebrate two shocking news. Ernesto asks Elena for forgiveness.
