= Ara Saldívar =

Mexican actress

- Born: Ara Elizabeth Martínez Saldívar; 7 February 1993 (age 33); Ciudad Victoria, Tamaulipas
- Occupations: Actress; singer
- Years active: 2004; 2014–present

Ara Elizabeth Martínez Saldívar (born 7 February 1993), known professionally as Ara Saldívar, is a Mexican actress and singer.

== Career ==
Saldívar's first television appearance was in 2004 when she competed in the children's singing competition series Código F.A.M.A., in which she came in tenth place. From 2014 to 2016, she worked as a reporter for the morning show Hoy. From 2019 to 2023, Saldívar guest starred in multiple episodes of La rosa de Guadalupe and Esta historia me suena.

In 2020, Saldívar landed her first major role in a television series when she was cast in the telenovela Te doy la vida, alongside José Ron and Eva Cedeño. In the telenovela, she portrayed Gabriela Villaseñor, the younger sister of Cedeño's character. The following year, Saldívar was cast in the telenovela Si nos dejan, portraying the role of Chela Contreras and performing the ending theme of the series. In 2022, she appeared in Mi camino es amarte in the role of Chuchita.

In 2024, Saldívar joined the cast of La historia de Juana, portraying Yadira Soto. Later that year, she competed in the reality series Los 50, finishing in 17th place after withdrawing from the competition due to injury. In 2025, she appeared in the telenovela Monteverde in the role of Rosalía Contreras.

== Filmography ==
Film roles
Year	Title	Role	Notes
2022	Amores Permitidos	Nicky Morales	

Television roles
Year	Title	Role	Notes
2004	Código F.A.M.A.	Herself	Contestant in season 2
2014–2016	Hoy	Herself	Reporter
2019–2022	La rosa de Guadalupe	Host Fátima	Episode: "Mirada de hija" Episode: "Promesa de amor"
2020–2023	Esta historia me suena	Jennifer Celia Jacky Lucía	Episode: "Me haces tanto bien" Episode: "Amor prohibido" Episode: "Si nos dejan" Episode: "Pedro Navaja"
2020	Te doy la vida	Gabriela Villaseñor	Main cast
2021	Si nos dejan	Celia "Chela" Ortega	Main cast
2022–2023	Mi camino es amarte	Jesusa "Chuchita" Galván	Main cast
2024	La historia de Juana	Yadira Soto	Main cast
2024	Los 50	Herself	Contestant in season 2
2025	Monteverde	Rosalía Gallegos	Main cast
2026	Sabor a ti		
