= Amor dividido =

Mexican telenovela

- Genre: Telenovela
- Based on: Allá te espero by Adriana Suárez & Javier Giraldo
- Developed by: Juan Carlos Alcalá
- Written by: Rosa Salazar; Fermín Zúñiga
- Directed by: Sergio Cataño; Luis Eduardo Reyes
- Starring: Eva Cedeño; Gabriel Soto; Arturo Peniche; Irina Baeva; Andrés Palacios
- Theme music composer: Alex Sirvent
- Opening theme: "Amor Dividido" by Shaila Dúrcal
- Country of origin: Mexico
- Original language: Spanish
- No. of seasons: 1
- No. of episodes: 107

Production
- Executive producer: Angelli Nesma Medina
- Producer: José Ignacio Alarcón
- Editor: Octavio López Reyes
- Camera setup: Multi-camera
- Production company: TelevisaUnivision

Original release
- Network: Las Estrellas
- Release: 17 January – 12 June 2022

Amor dividido (English title: Split Heart) is a Mexican telenovela that aired on Las Estrellas from 17 January 2022 to 12 June 2022. The series is produced by Angelli Nesma Medina for TelevisaUnivision. It is an adaptation of the Colombian telenovela Allá te espero. It stars Eva Cedeño, Gabriel Soto, Arturo Peniche, Irina Baeva, and Andrés Palacios.

== Plot ==
Abril (Eva Cedeño) and Max (Gabriel Soto) are two people who have nothing in common. For Abril, family is her priority, while for Max, being successful in the corporate world is the most important thing. She enjoys working in the fields and living in her hometown. He, despite being half Mexican, has completely forgotten his roots and is happy living in a first world country. For different reasons, both are forced to live in Mexico City and their lives begin to change radically until they are united in the midst of the loneliness and disappointment caused by the abandonment of their partners. Debra (Irina Baeva), Max's wife, decides to hide a pregnancy and resort to abortion without consulting her husband, who always had a strong desire to be a father. This fractures their marriage, and with Debra's unwillingness to adapt to the country her parents emigrated years ago, leads to divorce. Bruno (Andrés Palacios), Abril's husband, leaves her because his dream is to live in the United States, earning dollars to get ahead, following the example of his sister-in-law Julia (Elsa Ortiz), who a year ago decided to cross the border for the same reasons, leaving her two children, Lucero and Pancho, in charge of Abril, her sister, and mainly Cielo (Eugenia Cauduro), their mother.

Max arrives in Mexico to become the CEO of GoodFit and Abril receives the opportunity to be his personal assistant, with one condition: she must be single and childless in order to be available at all times. Because of her financial need, Abril makes the mistake of hiding the fact that she has a son, Hugo. In San Antonio, Bruno finds himself living a nightmare as an illegal immigrant. As soon as he has the opportunity, Bruno becomes the right hand of Minerva (Jessica Mas), a dangerous woman that is the head of an immigrant smuggling ring. The business leaves Bruno with a lot of money and to wrongly achieve what he dreamed of: to have it all. After a while, Bruno convinces Abril to travel with their son and start a new life in the United States. For cost reasons, they travel on separate flights. Hugo arrives in San Antonio, while Abril is deported because of Minerva, who arranged for the authorities to discover that Abril was going to stay illegally, as she was not going to allow her to ruin her plans to be with Bruno. With no hope of returning to the United States, Abril asks Bruno to return to Mexico with Hugo, but he is no longer willing to have the humble life he had before.

Abril vows to herself to do everything she can to get her son back. When Max confesses that he loves her and asks her to marry him, Abril accepts because she has also fallen in love with him. What motivates Abril the most to accept the marriage is to get her son back, since by marrying an American she could enter the United States to rescue her son, who is sad because of the abuses of Minerva, Bruno's lover. Abril and Max get married, but her happiness is in danger, since having married while hiding from Max that she has a son, could provoke the scorn of her new husband, the impossibility of recovering her son, and losing everything.

== Cast ==
=== Main ===
- Eva Cedeño as Abril Moreno
- Gabriel Soto as Max Stewart
- Arturo Peniche as Alejo Núñez
- Irina Baeva as Debra Puig
- Andrés Palacios as Bruno García
- José Elías Moreno as Domingo Moreno
- Gabriela Rivero as Rosaura Sánchez
- Eugenia Cauduro as Cielo Sánchez
- Elsa Ortiz as Julia Moreno
- Pedro Moreno as Amaury Ramírez
- Jessica Mas as Minerva Ortiz
- Ramiro Fumazoni as Fabricio Zepeda
- Lisardo as Lorenzo Iñíguez
- Marco Méndez as Valente Tovar
- Pedro Sicard as Phillipe Charpentier
- Julio Mannino as Benicio Quintana
- Lambda García as Danilo Medina
- Federico Ayos as Gabriel Núñez
- Laura Vignatti as Joana Foglia
- Alfredo Gatica as José
- Pablo Valentín as Picasso
- Fabián Robles as Kevin Hernández
- Fernando Robles as Miguel
- Roberto Tello as Mike
- Pato de la Garza as Pancho Tovar
- Iker García as Hugo García
- Paulina Ruíz as Lucero Tovar
- Sergio Madrigal as Renán de la Riva
- Iván Ochoa as Pipe

=== Recurring ===
- Jorge Gallegos as Osmar Gómez
- Ricardo Franco as Ramiro Salcedo
- Ligia Uriarte as Sonia Escobar
- Mar Bonelli as Xiomara Sosa
- Abril Schreiber as Mariana
- Luis Xavier as Silvio
- Francisco Avendaño as Ismael Puig
- Mara Cuevas as Enedina Alatriste
- Ricardo Vera as Pedro Zepeda
- Jorge Ortín as Sinesio Ramos
- Alejandro Peniche as Jerónimo
- Carlo Guerra as Jorge Gallardo
- Fermín Zúñiga as Fermín Zamora
- Andrea Guerrero as Esther
- Jessy Santacreu as Fabiola
- Rocío Leal as Norma Quiñonez
- Haydeé Navarra as Sofía

== Production ==
The telenovela was announced on 15 October 2020 at Televisa's Visión21 upfront with the working title Allá te espero. Filming began on 4 October 2021 and ended in March 2022. Filming took place in México City, Zacatlán, Puebla, and San Antonio, Texas. The official title of the telenovela was announced on 8 November 2021.

== Ratings ==
Viewership and ratings per season of Amor dividido
Season	Timeslot (CT)	Episodes	First aired		Last aired		Avg. viewers (millions)
Season	Timeslot (CT)	Episodes	Date	Viewers (millions)	Date	Viewers (millions)	Avg. viewers (millions)
1	Mon–Fri 6:30 p.m.	103 (Note: should reflect the number of episodes that contribute to the average given in the last column)	17 January 2022	3.1	12 June 2022	2.5	2.48

== Episodes ==
No.	Title	Original release date	Mexico viewers (millions)
1	"No me pidas que nos separemos"	17 January 2022 (Note: Premiered early online through Las Estrellas website on 14 January 2022.)	3.1
Max receives an offer to work in Mexico. Abril suffers when a fire breaks out and the entire crop is lost. Debra has an ultrasound and finds out that she is pregnant, and is afraid of ruining her plans. Abril and Domingo do not want to leave the farm, but Cielo wants to go to the city. Debra refuses to move to Mexico. Bruno begs Abril to go with him to the United States. Max suffers when he learns that Debra had an abortion.
2	"Dejar que la vida siga su curso"	18 January 2022	3.2
Cielo makes it clear to Domingo that she no longer wishes to stay at the farm, and Domingo realizes that his marriage no longer makes sense. Max decides to leave for Mexico without saying goodbye to Debra. Sonia has her job interview via video call and Fabricio decides to hire her. Julia receives an unseemly proposal. Abril is sad from having to leave the farm, but Bruno encourages her. Max decides to end his marriage. Fabricio is surprised by Sonia's disability. Gabriel confesses to his father that he is gay. Danilo suffers for his crime. Abril argues with Bruno and meets Max.
3	"Periodo de prueba"	19 January 2022	3.0
Abril and Max meet, Debra is rude to Abril. Abril offers to take them to Max's company. Fabricio is happy to know that Max is lost. Minerva proposes a business deal to Alejo. The police arrives at Minerva's restaurant for an inspection and Julia is in danger as she has no papers in order. Max arrives at GoodFit to put the company in order. After almost being discovered by the police and for not having papers in order, Minerva decides to fire Julia from the restaurant. Abril agrees to let Bruno go to the United States.
4	"El fin justifica los medios"	20 January 2022	3.3
Bruno finds Debra's wallet and steals a few dollars. Debra is worried when she realizes she lost her wallet. Abril and Bruno announce that Bruno is going to the United States. Alejo wants Gabriel to go to the United States to study. Fabricio leaves a lot of work for Sonia. Abril returns Debra's wallet to Max and takes the opportunity to ask him for a job. Alejo finds out about Gabriel's relationship with Jorge and despises them both. Sonia is fired by Fabricio.
5	"No confías en mí"	21 January 2022	2.9
Abril rushes to Max's office to complain about out Sonia getting fired, but Max explains that it was not his order. Bruno is determined to leave the country, however he longs to one day see his family again. Cielo incites Bruno to lie to Abril and he has to sell his belongings in order to pay for the trip to San Antonio.
6	"Mentiras piadosas"	24 January 2022	3.2
Bruno and Abril argue again about him going to the United States. Benicio wants Alejo to forge Max's signature. Julia agrees to go out with Miguel. Danilo is beaten in jail for not giving his payment on time. Bruno is shocked to see false documents indicating that he works at GoodFit. Abril arrives highly motivated at GoodFit. Benicio and Alejo threaten Bruno with harming his family if he doesn't cooperate. Max is upset to see Fabricio very close to Abril. Amaury questions Julia and kisses her.
7	"Eres una ladrona"	25 January 2022	2.9
Debra no longer wants to be in Mexico, as she wants to continue with her plans. Bruno has nightmares because of Benicio's threats. Domingo pays Valente's debt. Debra proposes to Max to work from home and if he can't, he will return to the United States. Rosaura asks Cielo to look for Domingo. Hugo wants to go to his cousins' school. Debra accuses Abril of being a thief and asks Max to fire her from GoodFit. Jorge discovers Bruno's profile. Julia looks for Kevin to apply for a job. Abril questions Bruno about the gifts he bought.
8	"Mantener bajo perfil"	26 January 2022	2.9
Abril questions Bruno since she was accused of being a thief and wants to know if he took the dollars from Debra's wallet. Julia does not accept the conditions for working with Kevin. Debra makes it clear to Abril that Max is her husband and that he would never look at a woman like her. Rosaura is uncomfortable with the displays of affection between Gabriel and Jorge. Max is furious with Debra for her jealousy. Bruno goes to the embassy to apply for a visa. Jorge confronts Alejo and Alejo asks Benicio to do everything so that Bruno does not show up at the embassy.
9	"Esa mujer te provoca algo"	27 January 2022	2.9
Alejo tells Esther that if anyone asks her about Bruno Garcia, to say no. Debra tells Osmar that she is going to San Antonio. Bruno gets a visa for 3 months. Debra tells Max that she is leaving because she wants to enjoy her success and because she knows that he has feelings for Abril. Amaury offers his help to Julia and tries to kiss her. Danilo is forced to sell drugs in prison. Domingo arrives in Mexico City and surprises everyone. Phillipe meets Domingo. Kevin decides to give Julia a job as a waitress.
10	"Reestructuración de área"	28 January 2022	2.8
Fabricio makes it clear to Max that he is interested in having Abril as his assistant. Abril presents new proposals. Bruno asks Julia for help to get a place to sleep. Alejo is upset to learn that Jorge is planning to divide his area because of the weird dealings. Domingo interrupts a conversation between Cielo and Phillipe. Abril offers to help Max in the office. Max complains to Alejo for not finding his assistant. Abril and Bruno enjoy their last night together. Jorge tells Gabriel that his father might be involved in a fraud.
11	"La última noche juntos"	31 January 2022	2.9
Gabriel is upset with Jorge for accusing his father of corruption, so he ends their relationship. Sonia stays late at work because of Fabricio. Max has nightmares about Abril and Fabricio. Bruno tells Abril that she is the woman he loves. Fabricio takes Sonia home and when he carries Sonia, she provokes something in him. Julia receives an indecent proposal from a client. Abril and Bruno spend one last romantic night before he leaves for the United States. Alejo tries to prevent Jorge from reporting him to Max, who makes a job proposal to Abril.
12	"Todos tenemos un precio"	1 February 2022	2.9
Max proposes to Abril to be his new personal assistant. Domingo invites Cielo to a restaurant to talk about their relationship and she makes it clear that she is not going back to the farm with him. Lucero agrees to go out with Mauricio. Bruno is upset to learn that Abril will be Max's personal assistant. Hugo feels bad to see his parents fighting. Alejo tries to buy Jorge's silence, but Jorge does not accept and to prevent him from reporting him, Alejo decides to kill him. Benicio learns that Abril works at GoodFit.
13	"Aquí te esperamos"	2 February 2022	2.7
Alejo asks Minerva for help to hide the fact that he killed Jorge. Bruno suffers when saying goodbye to Abril and Hugo at the airport. Gabriel listens to Jorge's voicemails. Danilo tells the story of how he was involved when he was arrested upon his arrival in Spain. Lucero introduces Renan to her aunt Abril. Benicio kills Jorge to help Alejo get out of trouble. Gabriel arrives desperately at Jorge's house to talk to him, but finds him lifeless. Abril remembers her love story with Bruno. Alejo learns that Abril is Bruno's wife.
14	"Soltera y sin hijos"	3 February 2022	2.7
Bruno manages to pass through immigration. Alejo looks for Gabriel in the police station to support him, but he rejects him because of Rosaura. Abril doesn't know whether to lie about her marital status to keep the job. Minerva is enchanted with Bruno. Alejo questions Abril about her marital status. Julia is happy with Bruno's arrival. Abril feels bad about hiding her family to get the job. Gabriel is released from jail. Max makes it clear to Abril that he can't stand lies. Minerva offers her home to Bruno so he can live there.
15	"El altruista y la mujer de las virtudes"	4 February 2022	2.7
Debra is furious when she learns that Abril is Max's new assistant and complains to him. Osmar invites Sonia to lunch. Gabriel asks his father for help to bury Jorge. Debra thinks about divorce. Gabriel does not want anyone to go to Jorge's wake. Julia advises Bruno to stay away from Minerva, who begins to see him with different eyes. Abril picks up Silvio Grande at the airport. Silvio warns Max that if he doesn't deliver results he will be fired from the company. Sonia gives Abril clothes to attend the cocktail party. Minerva sees Bruno naked in the shower. Abril shocks everyone with her beauty.
16	"Atrapar al mejor cliente"	7 February 2022	3.0
Max, Silvio and Osmar are impressed by Abril's beauty during the cocktail party. Gabriel looks for Rosaura to unburden himself. Alejo ends up putting his working conditions to Benicio. Alejo uses Jorge Gallardo's name to continue profiting from the migrants. Silvio tells Max that he feels that having Abril by his side could affect his performance. Fabricio wants to do business with Jerónimo and Jerónimo agrees to help him but asks him to get him a night with Abril. Danilo gets into a fight with his brother-in-law in jail. Bruno is furious when he learns that Abril worked very late.
17	"Debra me pidió el divorcio"	8 February 2022	2.6
Rosaura asks Alejo to support and accept Gabriel's preferences. Minerva leaves Bruno, so he can have his first day of work. Max is furious to learn that Debra wants to separate from him and Silvio assures him that Abril is to blame. Bruno starts working as a bricklayer in a construction site and meets José. Abril arrives with Fabricio for lunch with Jerónimo. Phillipe asks Cielo to talk to him alone. Max is worried about Abril and she begins to feel uncomfortable at lunch with Jerónimo.
18	"Vine a ver a mis hijos"	9 February 2022	3.3
Phillipe decides to confess to Cielo that he feels a lot of love for her. Valente leaves for Mexico City. Julia is jealous of Amaury. After Silvio's suggestion, Max decides to fire Abril. Renan invites Lucero to his apartment. Valente arrives in Mexico City looking for his children and Cielo, Domingo and Abril are surprised to see him. Miguel proposes to Julia that she marries him, in order to obtain permanent residency so she can take her children to the United States.
19	"Salvar el negocio"	10 February 2022	2.9
Julia rejects Miguel's marriage proposal. Bruno sleeps in the street because of Minerva. Abril stays up working late. Domingo allows Valente to sleep over. Pancho complains to Lucero for taking his father to the house. Minerva asks Bruno to take care of his work. Valente continues with his plans to get close to his children to take advantage. Abril proposes a solution to Max to fix the problem at GoodFit. Debra decides to break up with Max for good.
20	"Mi vida no tiene sentido"	11 February 2022	2.4
Gabriel, knowing that he has lost Jorge forever, decides to kill himself, but Danilo tries to help him and makes a confession. Minerva tells Julia that she cannot be working in her restaurant with false documents. Max threatens Fabricio with being fired from the company for harassment. Julia is worried because she fears that her ex-husband will not sign the permission for her children to join her. Enedina suggests to Debra that she travel to the city to be with Max. Bruno has no money to eat in the U.S. and seeks to feed himself with what he finds in the garbage. Amaury confesses to Julia that he loves her. Max makes Abril nervous.
21	"No sé estar sin ti"	14 February 2022	2.7
Valente argues with Cielo again. Kevin does not want Bruno to work with him. Julia asks Miguel to give her a green card with her information and not a fake one. Abril argues with her sister. Renán invites Lucero to smoke marijuana. Abril suffers because of Bruno's absence and he wants to return to Mexico after what he has experienced in the United States. Alejo learns that Gabriel tried to take his own life. Manolo agrees to confess everything so that Danilo can go free. Lucero suffers for having her mother far away and for Renán’s disappointment. Gabriel learns that Jorge was murdered.
22	"Cuidar el pellejo"	15 February 2022	2.9
Minerva gets Kevin to allow Bruno to return to work. Cielo and Domingo talk again about their relationship and their estrangement. Max starts to be very cold to Abril. Abril cries when she remembers saying goodbye to Bruno and Max tells her that he will miss her too. Gabriel vows to find Jorge's murderer. Danilo thanks Manolo for doing the right thing. Alejo questions Abril for saying she was single and childless, she tries to explain, but he asks her to see him as an ally. Cielo sneaks out with Phillipe and Valente discovers them.
23	"Queremos cosas diferentes"	16 February 2022	2.8
Phillipe takes Cielo out to lunch and they spend a nice afternoon together. Lucero argues with her mother and tells her that she will go to live with her father. Renán tries to talk to Lucero but she rejects him. Max and Debra reunite, but are unable to fix their marriage because of their different plans. Fabricio is jealous of Osmar. Domingo confronts Cielo about her mysterious exit. Picasso is a forgery expert who will help Benicio and Alejo in their frauds. Osmar gives Sonia flowers and Fabricio gets jealous. Minerva is determined to conquer Bruno.
24	"Aguas con esa mujer"	17 February 2022	2.9
Gabriel does not understand who could have killed Jorge and Alejo offends him. Bruno is upset about how the migrants are treated. Max talks to Silvio about his marriage problems with Debra. José tells Bruno that he is involved with the mafia and that he must watch out for Minerva. Bruno arrives to work as a plumber at Max's house. Bruno ends up running away when Max asks for his green card. Max decides to return to Mexico and Debra is upset that he is not making an effort to get his marriage back.
25	"Regresa a mis brazos"	18 February 2022	2.8
Bruno asks Minerva to let him be a waiter for a day. Amaury continues to be jealous of Miguel. Max makes it clear to Debra that he loves her and wants their relationship back, but Debra continues to be jealous of Abril. Domingo advises his daughter to tell Bruno to come back to Mexico. Abril asks Bruno to come back to Mexico, but he does not want to until he gets money. Amaury confesses his love to Julia, but she asks him not to confuse things. Danilo is released. Max complains to Abril and Osmar for getting into his space.
26	"Creo que soy tu hijo"	21 February 2022	2.7
Max complains to Abril and Osmar for intruding in his space and asks them not to do it again, since his wife will be in charge of decorating his apartment. Alejo threatens Esther not to talk about human trafficking or her family could be in danger. Valente begins to manipulate Lucero. Max learns that Jorge was murdered. Max confronts his past, visits a man who could be his father in the nursing home and discovers that he has Alzheimer's disease. Julia agrees to accompany Lorenzo in order to get money for Lucero's computer.
27	"Como moneda de cambio"	22 February 2022	2.8
Julia accepts Lorenzo's money to send it to Lucero. Xiomara begins to have small arguments with Ramiro. Lucero learns that Renán is about to be expelled from school. Gabriel is shocked to see Danilo, who is back in Mexico, Danilo gives his condolences for Jorge's death. Fabricio makes Sonia feel bad with his rudeness. Max refuses to make alliances with Jerónimo when he sees how he harasses Abril. As Fabricio gets upset, Max proposes a condition.
28	"Ya estás en tu casa"	23 February 2022	2.4
Lucero gives Valente the money her mother sent her. Hugo suffers when he sees all the gifts his aunt sent to his cousins. Cielo argues with Abril for not thinking about moving in with Bruno. Max brings ice cream to his father in the nursing home and receives a rebuff. Bruno tells Kevin that he wants to go back to Mexico. Cielo is indifferent to Phillipe when she discovers he is a Don Juan. Danilo returns to Rosaura's arms. Minerva proposes to Bruno to join her in her business to pay his debts, earn a lot of money and prevent him from going to Mexico.
29	"No me voy de mi país"	24 February 2022	2.8
Bruno proposes to Abril and Hugo to go live with him in the United States, but Abril rejects the idea. Rosaura is happy to have Danilo back. Renán invites Lucero to sneak out at night. Rosaura receives gifts from Danilo and he can't stand being stuck in his room. Renán proposes to Lucero to live together in his apartment, after being intoxicated.
30	"Con la cabeza fría"	25 February 2022	2.6
Sonia advises Abril. Alejo wants Max to talk to the embassy. Danilo promises Gabriel that he will help him so that Jorge's death does not go unpunished. Julia asks Bruno not to go back to Mexico. Max scolds Abril for using the company phone for personal calls, which makes Max jealous. Abril is afraid of making a wrong decision that could cost her her marriage. After much thought, Bruno decides to be part of the human trafficking business at Minerva's side. Max goes to the embassy with Abril and Alejo. Fabricio invites Sonia to lunch for her birthday.
31	"Los riesgos son infinitos"	28 February 2022	2.3
Sonia is disappointed by Fabricio's invitation. Bruno accepts Minerva's conditions. Renán asks Lucero to show him that she is more interested in him than a friend and they end up kissing. Abril tells Osmar that no matter how hard she tries, she can't convince Max. Abril is sure that Bruno did not do things legally to go to the United States. Osmar wants to surprise Sonia. Debra tells Max that it would be best for the lawyers to fix their marriage. Domingo feels uncomfortable at dinner next to Phillipe. Sonia and Abril are surprised to see Max arrive at the bar.
32	"Por lo menos lo intenté"	1 March 2022	2.2
Osmar prepares a surprise for Sonia. Lucero is surprised to learn that all the money was stole from her dad. Danilo confesses to his mom that he thought Phillipe was interested in her. Domingo overhears Philipe and Cielo talking about what they are both feeling. Abril teaches Max how to dance and Fabricio takes the opportunity to take a picture of them. Osmar declares his love to Sonia. Hugo complains to his mom for having fun without his dad. Abril and Max can't stop thinking about what happened at the bar.
33	"Voy a renunciar"	2 March 2022	2.7
Abril tells her family that she will be leaving for San Antonio. Debra explodes when she sees the video of Max dancing with Abril and calls him pathetic for cheating on her and decides to go through with the divorce. Abril informs Max that she will be leaving the assistant position because she wants to go live with her partner. Amaury continues to be indifferent to Julia. Phillipe asks Cielo out again. Danilo worries about Gabriel. Kevin humiliates Bruno. Max complains to Osmar about the video sent to his wife. Abril tells Bruno that she will go with Hugo to San Antonio.
34	"Por mí te puedes morir"	3 March 2022	2.7
Max swears to Debra that Abril is not his lover, but she breaks up with him for good. Philipe asks Cielo to let what they are both feeling flow. Max gets his father to give him a hug, but learns that Ernesto is not his father. Minerva tells Bruno that they will no longer be partners. Phillipe wants to spend time with Cielo. Danilo confronts Alejo about Gabriel. Max asks Abril to accompany him to Tulancingo. Gabriel remembers the day he met Jorge. Bruno argues with Abril. Danilo explodes against Rosaura.
35	"Perdóname Abril"	4 March 2022	2.5
Julia is willing to learn to dance, but she needs to get rid of her prejudices. Bruno visits Minerva with the intention of thanking her for all the support she has given him, but while drinking they begin to tell everything about their past. Tension rises during Bruno's visit to Minerva until they can no longer contain their desire to be together. Bruno regrets spending the night with Minerva and Minerva listens to him. Alejo is worried because his son has been summoned to testify about Jorge's death. Gabriel is subjected to an extensive interrogation to find out about the death of his partner and is presumed guilty of the crime.
36	"En carne propia"	7 March 2022	2.8
Abril and Max's plans are interrupted by a roadside demonstration, but this allows them to spend more time together. Gabriel is arrested for being the main suspect in Jorge's death. Bruno informs Abril that he got her employment letter. Osmar begins to feel jealous of Fabricio because of his closeness with Sonia. Alejo is worried about Gabriel's stay in prison and tries to do everything to get him released. Max accepts the dinner in Zacatlán de las Manzanas even though he later has a stomach problem. Sonia analyzes the situation of the machinery with Fabricio, but everything gets out of control because of their closeness.
37	"Yo la necesito"	8 March 2022	2.9
Abril confesses to Osmar that she will quit her job to move to San Antonio. Ramiro asks Xiomara to quit her job at the bar. Max is willing to accompany Abril to find out the situation of his farm. Domingo admits to Cielo that he wants to see her happy even though he is not. Ramiro tries to make a deal with Xiomara in exchange for their relationship not ending. Gabriel confesses to Danilo that Jorge suspected fraud with his father. Lucero is beaten by her grandmother after not coming home to sleep. Max confesses to Abril that he has changed thanks to her and that he needs her. Bruno reveals to his colleagues that he already has an employment letter and this causes a problem.
38	"Ya no quieres estar conmigo"	9 March 2022	2.5
Phillipe tries to convince Cielo that what is going on between them should not worry her. Minerva tries to explain to Julia the reasons why she gave the employment letter to Bruno. Max can't hold back tears as he remembers his past and wants to know more. Julia questions Amaury about his decision to move in with a woman. Osmar questions Sonia about her closeness with Fabricio. Rosaura informs Domingo that Cielo has a secret in her hands. Sonia calls Fabricio and gets a surprise. Phillipe takes Cielo to his house, but is surprised by Valente. Domingo tries to find out what is going on in his relationship with Cielo and confronts her. Minerva enters Bruno's room to kiss him, but something prevents it. Gabriel begins to be intimidated in jail.
39	"No me siento satisfecha"	10 March 2022	3.0
Alejo visits his son in jail and he questions him about the special treatment he has inside the prison. Bruno refuses to spend the night with Minerva and she will not give him the employment letter for Abril. Valente asks Cielo for money in exchange for his silence. Domingo confronts Renán but fails to reach a resolution. Danilo plans to help Gabriel and unmask Alejo. Bruno returns to Kevin to demand his money, but he refuses to pay and sends his men to beat him.
40	"La carta laboral viene en camino"	11 March 2022	2.5
José hears about Kevin's message to Bruno and goes to his rescue. Silvio convinces Debra to go to get Max back. Kevin arrives at Minerva's restaurant to tell her what happened and they argue. Valente arrives at the house and Pancho claims that he stole his videogame. Bruno decides to confront Kevin. To avoid more problems, Minerva pays the debt to Bruno, who thanks her for supporting him. Julia and Kevin reach a payment agreement once she starts dancing. Alejo learns who will confess to Jorge's murder and gives him instructions on what he will have to declare. Debra tells her parents that she will travel to Mexico to get Max back but he signs the divorce papers. Xiomara notices macho attitudes in Ramiro and decides to move out before the situation escalates. Danilo is ready to meet Max and start working at Goodfit. Minerva helps Bruno to send Hugo's papers and videogame. Abril is excited to see Bruno again.
41	"Bienvenido a GoodFit"	14 March 2022	N/A
Sonia confesses to Abril that she is in love with Fabricio. Fabricio questions Sonia about her feelings for him, but asks her to be discreet. Max hires Danilo, but Alejo is not pleased with the news. Fabricio learns of Abril's resignation and wants to speak to her because he wants to know if it is some kind of harassment from Max. Abril admits that she is confused by Max's behavior and wants to hasten her departure from the company. Debra is willing to do anything to stay by Max's side. Domingo feels increasingly distant from Cielo.
42	"Me has hecho mucha falta"	15 March 2022	N/A
Debra returns to Max's side, but he has changed so much that he doesn't want to go back to the life he had before. Phillipe proposes to Cielo that they spend the night in a motel. Domingo tells Abril that things are not going well with Cielo. Cielo agrees to spend the night with Phillipe, but when they get to the motel she regrets it. Cielo returns home, but sees Domingo in a different bed. Alejo tries to convince Abril to stay at the company, but she has made her choice very clear; however, Max tries to change her mind.
43	"Una mentira tras otra"	16 March 2022	2.5
Debra confesses to her mother that Max has changed a lot and doubts whether they will return to the United States together. Valente arrives at the internet café and tries to negotiate with Cielo to give him money in exchange for not telling anything about her relationship with Phillipe. Pancho receives the gift for Bruno and hides it. Bruno calls Abril to assure her that Hugo's gift and the employment letter were delivered. Cielo calls Julia to demand more money to pay her house debts, due to pressure from Valente. Fabricio informs Silvio that Max only wants a relationship with Abril.
44	"Traicionar tus valores"	17 March 2022	N/A
Alejo insists that Danilo stay out of his work, but Danilo thinks he is hiding something. Silvio puts a stop to any romantic relationship between Max and Abril, and asks Max not to forget the main objective for which he is in the company. Rosaura tries to talk to Cielo about the estrangement with Domingo. Alejo goes to pick up Gabriel from prison but he discovers that he has already left. Minerva makes it clear to Kevin that Bruno is now his partner. The relationship between Julia and Amaury is growing.
45	"Se nos están saliendo de las manos"	18 March 2022	N/A
Renán apologizes to Lucero and asks her to accompany him to another place. Minerva takes Bruno to her meeting with Mr. Paul, but he is not well received. Abril calls Julia to explain all the problems her children are having, but Julia gets upset and tells Abril that Bruno might be cheating on her. Lucero, Renán and the rest of the bikers are caught by the police. Cielo and her family go to the hospital to check on Lucero's health. Fabricio confesses to Sonia that he wanted to call her after their kiss, but something prevented him from doing so. Julia arrives at work and shows her dance in front of Mr. Paul.
46	"Llenos de tentaciones"	21 March 2022	2.3
Despite Julia's nerves about dancing in front of the public, she leaves Mr. Paul speechless. Renán recovers from his accident. Alejo discovers that Gabriel is at home, but is questioned by his son. Domingo and Cielo argue, but she takes advantage of the moment to leave her house and be near Phillipe. Gabriel finds the documents hidden by his father, which reveal that Jorge paid for his love. Minerva will do everything to prevent Abril from arriving in San Antonio. Abril calls Bruno because her sister's comment makes her doubt his fidelity.
47	"Que Dios te bendiga"	22 March 2022	2.6
Abril arrives with Debra and is interrogated. Debra is surprised to learn that Abril has a boyfriend. Cielo asks Phillipe to be more discreet because Rosaura is becoming aware of their romance. Max surprises Alejo by canceling all training trips and this sparks a problem with Danilo. Alejo confronts Danilo for meddling in his work and claims that he could know all of Danilo's secrets. Debra insists on knowing more about Abril's life and invites her to dinner.
48	"Me estoy enamorando de ella"	23 March 2022	2.9
Julia admits to Amury that she has begun to fall in love with him. Fabricio invites Sonia to dinner, but she objects. Lucero learns that Renán used illegal substances and that is why they crashed. Max argues with Debra for inviting Abril to dinner. Cielo continues to see Phillipe and is discovered by Domingo who is shocked to see his wife with another man. Upon arriving home, Domingo tells Cielo that she is free to see another man. Debra interrogates Max about his feelings for Abril and he admits that he is in love with Abril.
49	"Soy hija de prófugos de la justicia"	24 March 2022	2.3
Domingo decides to let go of Cielo so she can enjoy life with another man, but they prefer to keep this decision a secret. Debra meets a woman who reveals to her what happened with her father a few years ago. Max makes a strong confession to Abril about his feelings. Over drinks, Rosaura reveals some of her secrets to Phillipe. Sonia receives Fabricio's visit at her house and he kisses her. Minerva calls Benicio to ask him to stop Abril from coming to San Antonio because she could ruin all her plans.
50	"¡Nos dieron la visa!"	25 March 2022	2.1
Max demands Osmar to be more respectful with the company's personnel, especially Fabricio, but chooses not to fire him. Pancho calls Benicio with the intention of gathering information to go to the United States. Abril confesses to Bruno that she already has her visa and is ready to travel to San Antonio. Julia is willing to spend more time with Amaury. Debra apologizes to Max for the attitude she has taken with Abril and confesses that she would do anything to get him back, including getting pregnant. Fabricio prefers to keep his relationship with Sonia a secret and she accepts.
51	"¿Me llevas hasta San Antonio?"	28 March 2022	2.1
Minerva surprises Bruno with dinner at the apartment and gives him the keys to his new car. Bruno feels pressured, but Minerva assures him that it will be their last night together. Xiomara refuses any kind of commitment to Ramiro, but he insists that she be his wife. Ismael arrives in Mexico to talk to Debra about what happened in the past, but she singles him out for ruining her life. Minerva will do everything she can to stop Abril from coming to San Antonio.
52	"Una posibilidad de amar"	29 March 2022	2.3
Max thanks Abril for everything she did for him and wants to know more about her future outside the company. Domingo invites Phillipe to spend the weekend in Zacatlán. Max is sad about Abril's departure and decides to go to a bar to pass the time. Ismael tries to hide in Mexico, but is discovered by Fabricio.
53	"Al cielo o al infierno"	30 March 2022	2.2
Debra cannot hide her jealousy of Abril and decides to call her to ask for explanations about Max. Fabricio and his father decide to take action against Ismael now that he is in Mexico. Max tells Debra that he does not want to get back together with her. Pancho reveals to Lucero that they could go to San Antonio without their mother's help. Abril and Minerva talk over the phone. Abril is ready to fly to the United States, but Minerva will do everything to prevent it.
54	"Ya salió la paloma"	31 March 2022	2.2
Debra is ready to return to San Antonio and tells Max that she will sign the divorce papers. Sonia explains to Fabricio what happened with Osmar. Abril sends her son to San Antonio on a flight before hers. Julia can't help but feel bad that her sister will soon be arriving in the United States and she hasn't been able to take her children with her. Fabricio and his father plan to take action against Ismael for the crime he committed. Bruno offers José a job because of the support he received from him.
55	"Usted no puede entrar a Estados Unidos"	1 April 2022	2.2
Lucero unburdens herself with her father after Abril's farewell. Rosaura affirms that she wants Phillipe out of her house because he only played with her feelings. Cielo arrives for her date with Phillipe, she asks him to formalize their relationship. Bruno delivers a smaller payment to Kevin and explains that it is due to Licha's problems, but is threatened if he doesn't deliver the full money again. Esther tells Gabriel and Danilo the whole truth about Alejo, a fact that makes them more suspicious about Alejo’s guilt about Jorge's death. Hugo arrives in San Antonio. Abril arrives in the United States, but is denied entry because Minerva denies knowing her.
56	"Orden de deportación"	4 April 2022	2.2
The police inform Abril that she must return to Mexico because she does not meet the requirements to stay in San Antonio and will be deported. Cielo asks Phillipe to avoid being with Domingo as little as possible during his stay in Zacatlán. Bruno calls Minerva to help him find out where Abril might be. Osmar can't help but feel bad seeing Sonia with Fabricio. Abril's deportation proceedings begin and she must remain locked up in a cell. Bruno is desperate because his son disappeared has disappeared.
57	"Ya no hay vuelta atrás"	5 April 2022	2.0
Domingo and Cielo say goodbye thank each other for the good times they shared together. Sonia confronts Fabricio to ask him about his true feelings for her. Xiomara rejects Ramiro's marriage proposal. Hugo returns to his father, but receives bad news. Abril manages to communicate with Bruno and explains what happened with Minerva, but Minerva denies having received a call. Bruno is desperate for his wife's situation and asks for Minerva's help, but she rejects him.
58	"Repatriados sin escala"	6 April 2022	2.3
While Abril remains asleep, one of her cellmates takes all the money she has in her purse. Julia refuses to be by Lorenzo's side, even though he can help her with her children. Abril discovers that her money is missing from her purse and is desperate. Debra and Max argue, but she claims that everything is due to Abril's presence. Minerva tries to convince Bruno that the best thing for their family is for them to be separated. Hugo is reunited with his aunt Julia. Debra and Ismael are ready to return to San Antonio, but there is something in the way.
59	"Se lo llevaron a la cárcel"	7 April 2022	2.0
Ismael is about to return to San Antonio, but the airport authorities prevent him from doing so because of the crimes he committed. Valente arrives at Cielo's house to tell her that from now on he will live there in exchange for him keeping her secret. Sonia welcomes people with disabilities to the company. Rosaura confronts Cielo because she already knows that she is Phillipe's lover. Debra seeks Max's help to get her father out of jail. Rosaura informs Cielo that she will no longer be able to work with her. Pancho is ready to travel to San Antonio.
60	"Se acabaron los privilegios"	8 April 2022	2.2
The closeness between Gabriel and Danilo is more evident. Sonia learns that Fabricio left her for Paola and loses control of her wheelchair. Valente settles in Cielo's house, but discovers that his children do not lead a family life as he thinks. Fabricio discovers that Sonia knows the truth about his date with Paola. Sonia refuses to talk to Fabricio. Debra asks Max to stay by her side for the night. Minerva tries to convince Bruno to stay in San Antonio. Domingo overhears a conversation between Phillipe and Cielo, but gets terrible news.
61	"No lo logré"	11 April 2022	2.3
Julia blames Miguel for the life she is leading because he cheated her out of the money she gave him. Danilo returns to his mother's house because he knows about Fabiola's visit to Mexico. Abril returns to Mexico and Osmar discovers her at the airport. Max is interested in knowing how Abril is doing. Pancho discovers that he was swindled by the men who would take him to San Antonio. Debra believes she still has a chance of recovering her relationship with Max. Domingo returns to his farm and discovers the bad state it is in. Gabriel could tell everything he knows about Jorge's death.
62	"Ella se va a quedar con él"	12 April 2022	2.2
Fabiola asks Danilo for forgiveness, but he warns her that he cannot get back together with her because of what happened. Gabriel returns to jail to talk to the alleged culprit for what happened to Jorge. Debra refuses to lose her family patrimony so that her father can get out of jail. Gabriel asks his father for money and lies about where the money is going. Abril calls San Antonio, but is surprised to learn of Bruno's closeness to Minerva. Abril plans to return to San Antonio after her sister's warning. Julia is fed up with Miguel and assures him that she will never be his wife because of the damage he did to her. Abril confesses to Sonia that Max kissed her and now doubts her feelings.
63	"Me quiero quedar con mi papá"	13 April 2022	2.1
Abril returns to her family's side. Abril contacts Hugo and informs him that it is unlikely that she will return to San Antonio. Bruno urges Abril to return to the United States, but she objects because of her condition and asks him to return with her son. Ramiro opposes Xiomara's return to music. Norma and Osmar visit Sonia, but this takes her by surprise. Minerva does everything possible to keep Bruno by her side and proposes him to be the new manager of the business with Mr. Paul, which he accepts. Gabriel discovers that his father had something to do with Jorge's death.
64	"Gabriel enfrenta a Alejo con la verdad"	14 April 2022	1.8
After a phone call, Alejo discovers that Danilo was in jail. Julia becomes jealous when she sees Amaury with Xiomara. Abril confirms that she cannot return to the U.S. for several years and hopes that Bruno will return her son. Julia assures Abril that if she does not return Minerva is able to keep Bruno. Fernando offers his land as he is interested in buying Domingo's farm. Abril and Max meet again. Alejo blackmails Danilo. Debra decides to continue fighting for Max's love, but he no longer wants to get back together.
65	"Tu lugar es conmigo"	15 April 2022	1.9
Valente arrives at Lucero's school to ask for money. Max looks for Abril to apologize and proposes to return to the company. Gabriel is ready to sue his dad. Danilo lets his mom know that he is not thinking about Fabiola. Benicio threatens Alejo to do something about Gabriel. Bruno comments to Abril that if she wants her son back she must return to him. Alejo warns Gabriel that the people he works with are dangerous and asks him not to talk to the police. Minerva fears that the truth will be discovered.
66	"Agárrate de mí"	18 April 2022	2.4
Ramiro warns Xiomara that he might act against Amaury if he sees her near him. Phillipe feels guilty about Cielo and Domingo's separation. Danilo consoles Gabriel and tells him that he will always be with him and kisses him. Debra rejects Max's friendship as she only wants his love. Danilo tries to justify what happened with Gabriel, but he does not remember what happened between them. Sonia receives a better job offer thanks to Max. Valente returns to Cielo's house, but is kicked out, and he reveals Phillipe and Cielo’s relationship to Abril.
67	"Ya no soy tu mujer"	19 April 2022	2.3
Sonia confesses to Fabricio about the new position Max offered her. Abril has doubts about what Valente said and questions her mother about what is going on with Phillipe. Cielo admits to being attracted to Phillipe, which is why she separated from Domingo. Abril calls Minerva to ask for explanations about Bruno, but the latter denies everything that happened with him. Abril talks to Bruno on the phone to clarify his situation and she decides to break up with him. Debra finds the divorce papers and threatens Max with not signing anything. Danilo is confused about his feelings for Gabriel.
68	"Por las buenas o las malas"	20 April 2022	2.4
Danilo is worried because Gabriel is not answering his calls or messages. Alejo wants to inform his son that he no longer works for Benicio, but discovers him attempting suicide. Abril believes that she is to blame for the separation of her family. Valente waits for his children outside the house, but they are defended by Renán and Pablo. Fabiola arrives at Rosaura's café and informs Danilo that he is a father and abandons their son because she believes she is incapable of taking good care of him. Kevin discovers Hugo's presence in San Antonio and this alerts Bruno. Rosaura begins to spend time with her grandson Iñaki, but discovers Danilo's deportation papers.
69	"La distancia es más fuerte que el amor"	21 April 2022	2.1
Benicio warns Alejo of the danger he is in if he decides to leave the business. Max arrives home and discovers that Debra left the divorce papers along with her wedding ring. Abril worries about Hugo's absence and Lucero makes it clear to her that she will support her in suing Bruno for custody of Hugo. Minerva confronts Bruno for fighting with Kevin. Bruno gets upset with Abril for her lack of ambition, Minerva takes advantage and kisses Bruno. Debra visits her father in prison and gives him the news that she does not plan to sell any of her assets, so he will have to serve his sentence. Max visits Abril and gives her the news that he is a free man.
70	"Me voy a divorciar"	22 April 2022	2.1
Danilo confesses the whole truth to his mother about what happened in Spain, but Rosaura refuses to believe him and asks him to leave the house. Alejo discovers that Benicio sent his men to end Gabriel's life. Abril talks to Hugo on the phone and he tells her everything that is going on between his father and Minerva. Alejo visits Benicio to threaten him. Abril tells her mother that she was cheated on by Bruno in the United States. Danilo arrives at Cielo's house after being kicked out by his mother. Alejo gets his way after Max agrees to resume training.
71	"Me enamoré perdidamente"	25 April 2022	2.4
Fabricio insists that Ismael Puig return all the money he stole from them to get the company back. Kevin plans to turn Minerva against Bruno. Abril receives Bruno's call to apologize for what happened, but she rejects him. Fabricio threatens Max to get 60% of his company back. Mariana agrees to romance Bruno in exchange for Kevin helping Julia take her children to San Antonio. Pancho receives news that his dream of traveling to the United States could be ruined. Alejo threatens Minerva to end the business if anything happens with Gabriel.
72	"¿En qué momento se acabó la familia?"	26 April 2022	2.3
Osmar and Sonia go out to dinner and they kiss. Julia threatens Miguel with telling everything she knows about him. Xiomara is disappointed in Ramiro's behavior. Osmar regrets kissing Sonia. Pancho needs his father's signature to travel to San Antonio, but Valente will only give it to him if he confesses that he stole the things from Cielo's house. Abril is willing to go back to work with Max.
73	"No quiero volver a verte"	27 April 2022	2.2
Danilo kisses Gabriel and the latter wakes up from his coma, but Alejo notices everything. Gabriel asks his father to turn himself in to the police. Valente calls Julia to tell her that he will only give his children his signature in exchange for a good sum of money. Sonia admits that Osmar turned out to be a gentleman compared to Fabricio. Miguel looks for Amaury to tell him that Julia works as a dancer in a bar. The police investigate Phillipe's disappearance. Rosaura confronts Cielo to find out how she feels about Phillipe.
74	"Curar las heridas"	28 April 2022	2.3
Rosaura complains to Cielo for loving Phillipe despite being married and knowing that she liked him. Amaury has doubts about Julia and tries to find out if what Miguel said is true. Lucero is convinced to support her father at all costs, but warns Valente that she will take care of the money her mother will send. Amaury interrogates Xiomara to find out if she knows anything about Julia and her night job. Sonia regrets that Fabricio does not take her seriously and puts a stop to their relationship. Valente shows up at Renán's apartment and Lucero confesses to her boyfriend that she will not leave her father. Cielo talks to Abril and assures her that Max has already gotten into her heart.
75	"Perder al amor de tu vida"	29 April 2022	2.3
Minerva applauds Bruno for his efforts to get his own contracts. Amaury sees Julia dancing at the bar. Abril offers Danilo that while he and Gabriel get an apartment, they can stay with them. Rosaura scolds Gabriel, he makes her see that she should give Danilo one more chance. Rosaura offers Danilo to come back to live with her but under her rules, he rejects her offer as he wants to make it on his own. Hugo takes advantage of the fact that Bruno and Minerva are asleep to call Abril and try to convince her to join them in San Antonio.
76	"Un completo desastre"	2 May 2022	2.1
Lorenzo observes Julia and Miguel's argument and decides to get rid of him. Sonia and Abril receive the news that the room for the GoodFit event was not confirmed in time. Lucero discovers that her father escaped with all the money her mother sent. Cielo decides to go to the hotel where she was seeing Phillipe and discovers that he is there with another woman. Abril manages to make the GoodFit event happen.
77	"Aceptar la derrota"	3 May 2022	2.0
Phillipe confesses to Cielo that he changed his mind about their relationship after hearing Domingo's story. Max admits that Abril is the most important thing to him. Cielo talks to Phillipe about her story with Domingo and she admits that sooner or later she would separate from her husband. Picasso and Benicio convince Alejo to expand his business to other parts of the world. Pancho tells his mother that Valente fled without signing the documents. The Latin festival begins at Minerva's restaurant.
78	"¡Que nadie se mueva!"	4 May 2022	2.1
The immigration police arrive at Minerva's restaurant. Max confesses to Abril that he loves her. Sonia ends her relationship with Fabricio because he does not recognize her as his girlfriend. Julia informs Pancho that his trip could only be by land, despite the danger involved. Bruno and Hugo hide in the freezer to avoid being captured by the police.
79	"No puedo ocultarlo más"	5 May 2022	2.3
Abril saves her son's life and Bruno's by calling them on the phone, so they realize that they have a way to communicate with the outside world. Upon leaving the freezer, Hugo calls Abril and explains the problem, which makes him think about returning to Mexico. Abril is worried about her son's situation and when she calls her lawyer, he tells that she must pay a legal expert in the United States. During Abril and Max's dinner, she admits to being in love and decides to give him a chance.
80	"Tu amante"	6 May 2022	2.1
Alejo convinces Max to send more employees to train more people in San Antonio. Abril tells Sonia that she is uncomfortable about her relationship with Max. Debra discovers Max and Abril kissing. Debra explains to Max her father's situation with Fabricio and his family, as well as her financial problems. Phillipe is back at Rosaura's house. Max wants to avoid problems so he plans to leave GoodFit.
81	"De aquí no sale nadie"	9 May 2022	2.3
Max explains to Abril the situation Debra is going through and thinks it is best to leave GoodFit. Benicio gives Pancho information about the trip to San Antonio and Pancho learns of the danger it represents. Domingo reveals to Abril that he recovered the farm thanks to Fermín’s support. Cielo fears that Phillipe will stay by Rosaura's side. Bruno already has an ID thanks to Minerva. Xiomara returns home to get her things, but is discovered by Ramiro who is surprised to see her with Amaury. Abril confesses to her mother that she is afraid of losing Max by telling him about her son.
82	"El lugar que me merezco"	10 May 2022	1.6
Ramiro apologizes to Xiomara for his jealous outbursts and asks her for another chance, but she rejects him. Minerva tries to convince Bruno to introduce her as his wife in exchange for a green card. Julia calls Pancho, and finds out that he has left for San Antonio. Rosaura tries to convince Phillipe to stay by her side. Debra tries to humiliate Abril in front of everyone and Abril slaps her.
83	"Sus propios intereses"	11 May 2022	2.5
Debra thinks that humiliating Abril was the best thing to do, but Max rejects her in front of everyone at the congress. Cielo can't help but feel jealous of her sister, as Rosaura tries to make her believe that there is something more with Phillipe. Pancho is on his way to San Antonio, but is frightened by the coyotes and they steal his things. Fabricio tries to overshadow Max's presentation and his reporter begins to question Max about his relationship with Ismael Puig.
84	"Juntos saldremos adelante"	12 May 2022	2.4
While Max is getting ready to leave GoodFit's company, Pedro assures Fabricio that he does not plan to vote Max out of the company. Valente is back in town, but confesses that he lost all the money Julia gave him. Pancho is in danger at the hands of the coyotes, who plan to sell him to someone else. Max proposes to Abril that they have a future together. Bruno and Mariana spend the afternoon together, but are photographed.
85	"Todo tiene un límite"	13 May 2022	2.2
Max receives a visit from Debra and he offers to buy the apartment because he could return to San Antonio. Renán proposes to Lucero that they go to the cabin before his father takes him to Germany by force. Debra can't stand the idea of just being Max's friend and confesses that she is still interested in him. Minerva receives a call from Kevin to tell her that Bruno is seeing another woman.
86	"Legalmente divorciada"	16 May 2022	2.3
Rosaura is sad because Phillipe didn't come to the dinner she had prepared. Cielo tries to convince Abril that the best thing for her is to marry Max and rescue Hugo. Kevin shows Minerva the images of Bruno with another woman. Abril refuses to get a benefit from Max without first telling him that she has a son. Renán and Lucero spend the day together. Xiomara tries to convince Julia to return to the restaurant and have a dignified life. Max resigns from GoodFit and Fabricio wants to be the new manager. Minerva confronts Bruno because she knows his secret.
87	"Se te acabó la suerte"	17 May 2022	2.2
Danilo finds a notebook belonging to Gabriel in which there is evidence of Alejo's guilt. Bruno admits that he is interested in Mariana. Max wants Alejo to give him all the papers of the people who traveled to San Antonio. Cielo takes advantage of Rosaura's absence at the internet café to visit Phillipe. Alejo finds Danilo talking to his secretary. Danilo discovers a couple of men chasing him and later confirms that Alejo sent them.
88	"No te quiero perder"	18 May 2022	2.4
Rosaura discovers that Cielo is in Phillipe's room. Cielo tells Rosaura that she is Phillipe's official girlfriend, causing Rosaura's jealousy. Gabriel asks Danilo not to investigate more about Alejo because they are in danger and he does not want to lose him. Bruno and Hugo arrive at Julia's house after being kicked out of Minerva's house. Alejo continues with his plans to smuggle more people to the United States. Renán and Lucero are surprised by Mr. de la Riva at the cabin.
89	"Nunca es fácil matar"	19 May 2022	2.6
Phillipe is worried about Rosaura's situation and immediately looks for Cielo to help her. Max finds his father's farm, but is informed that he lost his life. Danilo looks for his mother to get her out of the situation she is facing. Lucero tries to make a good impression on Renán's father. Max listens to his father's widow and believes that Ernesto never loved him; however, he receives his father's diary in which he discovers the opposite. Alejo intercepts Esther and realizes her betrayal and decides to kill her.
90	"¿Aceptarías casarte conmigo?"	20 May 2022	2.2
Max learns that his father left him half of his farm. Minerva warns Kevin that Alejo's route is closed and that even though the route is closed, a new route will be opened worldwide, she also asks Kevin to collect all the outstanding debts from Bruno, Mariana listens to them. Julia asks Amaury to deliver some money to Minerva. Max wants to take Abril to San Antonio, but Osmar makes him see that she doesn't want that. Max asks Abril to marry him, she accepts. José cannot go ahead with the trip to the border, Pancho decides to help him.
91	"La vida da muchas vueltas"	23 May 2022	2.4
Cielo accepts that Renán lives in the house. Bruno wants to work at Lorenzo's bar, but he realizes that Julia dances there. Max proposes to Abril that they travel the world together, but she thinks that there are obstacles to achieve this. Cielo questions Lucero and Renán about their romance and they confirm that their relationship is serious. Bruno talks to Julia to find out why she is dancing at Lorenzo's bar, she confesses to Bruno what she went through to get to Lorenzo's bar. Silvio informs Fabricio that he will be the new manager of GoodFit. Abril arrives at her father's ranch and Max takes the opportunity to get engaged in front of Domingo.
92	"La verdad está por encima de todo"	24 May 2022	2.4
Fabricio tries to convince Sonia to start their personal and professional relationship again, but she no longer believes in him. Bruno learns that Kevin was close to Hugo, so he visits him to attack him. Danilo enters Alejo's office and finds evidence that could endanger Alejo. One of the migrants traveling on Benicio's behalf raises suspicions on the part of the immigration police. Sonia accidentally spills drinks for Fabricio and Jerónimo makes her feel bad with a series of comments. The immigration police follow in the footsteps of Max and Alejo. Debra learns Abril's secret and soon tells Max.
93	"Todo o nada"	25 May 2022	2.3
Bruno visits Minerva to clarify the money situation, but she tries to seduce him, Bruno remembers Julia's words and rejects Minerva. Fabricio is arrested by the police for drunk driving. Danilo does everything he can to get his mother out of her depression. José is about to give up in the desert, but Pancho encourages him. Julia returns to the restaurant in the hope that Minerva will take her back. Abril receives bad news about Hugo's condition in the United States.
94	"Ven por mí"	26 May 2022	2.2
José thinks he will not be able to cross the border, so he decides to give Pancho his phone so he can get in touch with his mother. Hugo can no longer bear to be in San Antonio without his mother and asks her to return. Gabriel and Danilo arrive at the public prosecutor's office to report Alejo for all the crimes he has committed. Alejo arrives at the jail to threaten Santino with getting rid of his mother if he doesn't end his life. José asks Hugo to continue on his way through the desert because he can't go on any longer. Abril remembers her father's words and prepares to reveal her secret to Max.
95	"Mi niño se me perdió"	27 May 2022	1.9
Rosaura believes that Cielo is locked in the room with Phillipe and loses control when she tries to open the door. Julia is desperate to find Hugo, but receives more bad news when Minerva informs her that she will not return to the restaurant. Danilo asks Phillipe to leave his mother's house, because Rosaura is suffering too much because of his relationship with Cielo. Max takes advantage of the special dinner with Abril to propose to her. Abril is excited, but wants to tell him the secret about her life; however they are interrupted by Debra.
96	"Nadie regresa por los caídos"	30 May 2022	2.4
Max looks for Abril to ask her to get married as soon as possible. Abril receives a call from Julia to inform her that Hugo has shown up and Abril talks to him. Sonia puts an end to Osmar's hopes of having a relationship because she plans to return to Monterrey with her parents. José and the group of migrants manage to cross the river, but realize that Pancho has not arrived. Osmar promises Sonia that he will always love her no matter what. José searches for Pancho, but only finds his tennis shoes. Everything is ready for Abril and Max's wedding.
97	"Pancho no aparece"	31 May 2022	2.5
José wakes up in the hospital and immediately asks for Pancho. The immigration police are looking for Alejo and Max for being the main suspects of human trafficking. Bruno calls Abril and she makes it clear that she is in love with Max. Julia is worried because she has not heard from Pancho for several days. Sonia presents her resignation to Fabricio. José calls Bruno to inform him that Pancho disappeared in the river while trying to get to the United States. Debra arrives at GoodFit to settle her father's debt with the Zepedas, Fabricio reveals to her that Max and Abril are married.
98	"El americano está a la cabeza de la red"	1 June 2022	2.4
Phillipe receives a visit from Rosaura and she asks him to return to her house, but he refuses because he does not want to hurt her. José is still looking for Pancho in the river where he got lost. Max is the main suspect of the immigration police for sending people to the United States. Gabriel confronts Benicio, and Benicio tells him that Alejo murdered Jorge. Gabriel flees to Danilo's side and Danilo confesses that he is in love with him. Bruno looks for Minerva to pay her some of the money he owes her and asks her to help him look for Pancho.
99	"Como si se lo hubiera tragado el río"	2 June 2022	2.3
Cielo packs her bags to travel to France with Phillipe, but he makes it clear that he is traveling alone. José returns to the river to look for more clues about Pancho, but is surprised to find other people. Fabricio finds Sonia on a call and immediately asks her for explanations. Julia receives a call from José to inform her that Pancho is missing in the desert. Julia calls Benicio to ask him for answers about what is happening with Pancho, but he asks her to be prepared for the worst.
100	"Maté a mi bebé"	3 June 2022	2.3
Cielo looks for her sister to tell her what happened with Phillipe. Julia arrives at Minerva's restaurant to ask her to help her locate Pancho, Minerva agrees to help her. Cielo and Rosaura manage to forgive each other, despite having fallen in love with the same man. José arrives at Julia's house to give her the news of Pancho's death, leaving Julia devastated. Max receives bad news from the consul when he is informed that he is in serious trouble for sending more people for training.
101	"Orden de captura"	6 June 2022	2.3
Julia tries to convince Bruno that the best thing for the family is to return to Mexico. Fabricio proposes to Sonia that she stay in her position, due to her excellent training. The police arrive at GoodFit to arrest Max, but Gabriel's sudden appearance puts Alejo in danger. Cielo and Rosaura arrive at Domingo's farm to start a new life. Julia thanks Amaury for everything he did for her and they say goodbye. Alejo calls Minerva because he discovered that Benicio took all the company's money. Esther is alive and hospitalized. Abril gets a surprise when she is reunited with her son and the rest of her family.
102	"¿Te casaste con él?"	7 June 2022	2.7
Julia and Bruno inform the family that Pancho did not make it across the border and lost his life. Gabriel warns his father that Benicio could turn him in if the police find him. Bruno fails to understand Abril's decision to marry Max. Julieta asks Amaury to cremate Pancho and send his ashes to Mexico. Debra arrives at Abril's house and meets Hugo.
103	"¡Abril tiene un hijo!"	8 June 2022	2.5
Alejo tries to negotiate with Benicio for what he stole, but ends up killing him. Cielo feels some guilt over Pancho’s death. Debra looks for Max in prison to tell him that Abril lied to him and has a son, but Max reveals that he already knew about Hugo's existence. Cielo tells Domingo that she is happy to be by his side. Max tells Debra how he found out Abril's secret and the reasons that made him forgive her. Abril reads her father's letter in which she reveals that he told the whole truth to Max. Abril looks for Max in prison to explain everything.
104	"Voy a luchar por Abril"	9 June 2022	3.0
Max asks Abril to find out about Bruno's legal situation and wants to see him face to face. Domingo rejects the idea of getting back together with Cielo. Abril asks Bruno to find Max to help him get out of jail, but he objects. Julia and Lucero find Valente begging on the street and tell him what happened with Pancho. Esther wakes up in the hospital and denounces Alejo for what he did to her. Bruno follows Abril's advice and looks for Max in jail, but only to tell him that he will fight for Abril's love.
105	"Hazla feliz"	10 June 2022	2.3
Esther wakes up and declares to the police that Alejo is guilty of the fraud at GoodFit. Alejo calls Minerva to inform her about what is happening in Mexico. Bruno arrives at the office of the officer in charge of the GoodFit fraud case and confesses that Max is not behind the business. Julia manages to reunite with her parents. Fabricio asks Sonia to start a formal relationship, but she objects because she loves Osmar. Julia and her family say goodbye to Pancho. Bruno looks for Max to inform him that Alejo is the culprit of the fraud at GoodFit.
106	"Me salvó la vida"	12 June 2022	2.5
107	"Escribir una historia de amor"	12 June 2022	2.5
Lorenzo shows up in Julia's town to threaten her and gives the order to Picasso to kill Bruno. Max saves Bruno's life when he is hit by a bullet. Abril and Debra meet at the hospital, but Debra accepts that she has lost Max. Max is saved thanks to the organ donated by Bruno. Lorenzo arrives at the hospital and tries to intimidate Abril, but is cornered by the police. Julia distracts Lorenzo to let go of Abril, and he is apprehended by the police. Bruno says goodbye to Abril and vows to love her forever. Fabricio is fired by his father and the CEO position is taken by Sonia. Minerva and Kevin are arrested in a raid and prosecuted for illegal human trafficking. Danilo decides to take his relationship with Gabriel to the next level and proposes marriage. Bruno and his friends celebrate the success of the restaurant and their stable relationships. The Moreno family are surprised by the announcement of Abril's pregnancy.
