= Álvaro Espinoza (actor) =

Chilean actor

Alvaro Espinoza
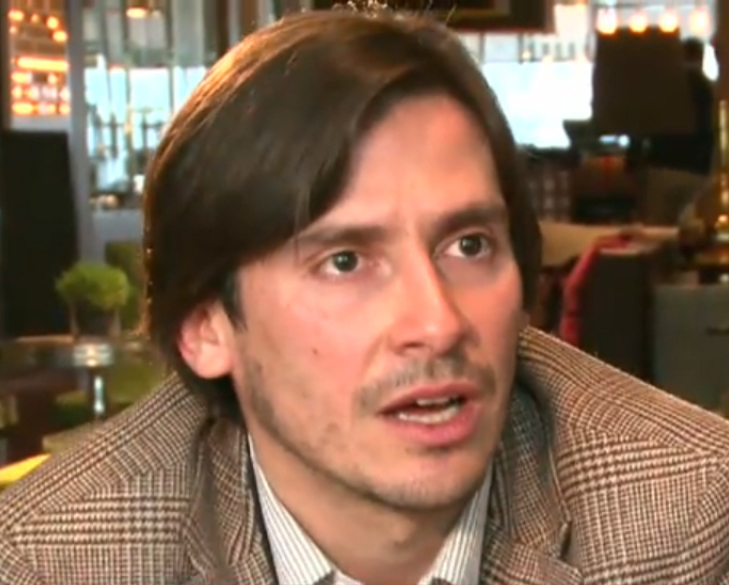
- Born: March 3, 1974 (age 52); Santiago, Chile
- Occupation: Actor
- Years active: 1995–present

Álvaro Marcelo Espinoza Concha (Santiago, March 3, 1974) is a Chilean actor of theater, cinema and television.

Noted for his interventions in telenovelas such as Romané (2000), Pampa Ilusión (2001), Los Pincheira (2004), Ídolos (2004), Los treinta (2005), El Señor de la Querencia (2008), Pacto de sangre (2018) and Amor a la Catalán (2019).

Since 1998 he has been a partner of the actress Catalina Olcay, with whom he had two daughters, Octavia and Alicia Espinoza. He is the brother of the actress Marcela Espinoza. He studied at the theater school of the Pontificia Universidad Católica de Chile.

== Filmography ==
=== Film ===
Year	Film	Role	Director
1999	Juegos artificiales		David Benavente
2000	Ángel Negro	Rafael Álvarez	Jorge Olguín
2000	Monos con navaja	Ítalo	Stanley Gonczanski
2004	La perla del puerto	Periodista	Rodrigo Cepeda
2005	El Baño		Gregory Cohen
2007	Casa de remolienda	Graciano Morales	Ignacio Eyzaguirre
2008	Secretos		Valeria Sarmiento
2008	Juan Mandinga		Nicolás Labra
2009	Teresa: Crucifidada por amar	Mariano Balmaceda	Tatiana Gaviola
2014	El niño rojo	Marqués de Avilés	Ricardo Larraín
2016	Neruda	Oficial de frontera	Pablo Larraín
2018	Mujer saliendo del mar	Doctor	Pablo Rojas
2018	Dry Martina	Juan	Che Sandoval
2018	¿Cómo andamos por casa?		Boris Quercia

=== Telenovelas ===
Teleseries
Year	Telenovela	Character	Director	Channel
1996	Sucupira	Cachetito Rapollo	Vicente Sabatini	TVN
1998	A todo dar	Pedro Velásquez	Herval Abreu	Mega
1999	Algo está cambiando	Wilson	Herval Abreu	Mega
2000	Romané	Claudio Gaete	Vicente Sabatini	TVN
2001	Pampa Ilusión	Ricardo Fuenzalida	Vicente Sabatini	TVN
2002	El circo de las Montini	Alexander Quintero	Vicente Sabatini	TVN
2003	Puertas adentro	Joaquín Martínez	Vicente Sabatini	TVN
2004	Los Pincheira	Jamal Abu Kassem	Vicente Sabatini	TVN
2004–2005	Ídolos	Andrés Baeza	Óscar Rodríguez	TVN
2005	Los treinta	Paulo Toledo	Víctor Huerta	TVN
2006	Cómplices	Matías Fuenzalida	Vicente Sabatini	TVN
2007	Corazón de María	Patricio Chandía	Vicente Sabatini	TVN
2008	Viuda alegre	Alexis «Chaleco» Opazo	Vicente Sabatini	TVN
2008	El señor de la Querencia	Buenaventura Moreno	Germán Barriga	TVN
2008	Hijos del Monte	Esteban Montero	Víctor Huerta	TVN
2009	Los exitosos Pells	Diego Planes	Germán Barriga	TVN
2010	Martín Rivas	Agustín Encina	Germán Barriga	TVN
2011	El laberinto de Alicia	Gregorio Harper	Rodrigo Velásquez	TVN
2012	Pobre rico	Luis Felipe Tagle	Rodrigo Velásquez	TVN
2014	Mamá mechona	Andrés Mora	Germán Barriga	Canal 13
2016	Te doy la vida	Emilio San Martín	Claudio López	Mega
2016	Sres. papis	Tomás Ovalle	Patricio González	Mega
2018–2019	Pacto de sangre	Benjamín Vial «Señor Rojo»	Cristián Mason	Canal 13
2019–2020	Amor a la Catalán	Primitivo Mardones	Vicente Sabatini	Canal 13
2021	La torre de Mabel	Gaspar Elizondo	Cristián Mason	Canal 13

=== TV Series ===
Year	Serie	Role	Channel
1997	Las historias de Sussi	Sergio	TVN
1997	Brigada Escorpión	Jimmy	TVN
2006	Tiempo final: En tiempo real	Luis	TVN
2008	Aída		TVN
2009	Una pareja dispareja	"Colmillo" Gutiérrez	TVN
2010	Algo habrán hecho por la historia de Chile	Conquistador Pedro de Valdivia	TVN
2012	El diario secreto de una profesional	Dr. David Riveros	TVN
2014	El niño rojo	Cosme / Marqués de Avilés	Mega
2015	El bosque de Karadima	Flaco Martínez	Chilevisión
2015–2017	Lo que callamos las mujeres	Varios personajes	Chilevisión
2017	12 días: Tragedia en Juan Fernández	Manuel Ortiz	Chilevisión

== Theatre ==
- Fuenteovejuna
- El Mercader de Venecia
- No me pidas la luna (1999)
- El misántropo (2019)
