= Sabor a ti (Mexican TV series) =

- Genre: Telenovela
- Based on: Sabor a ti by José Ignacio Valenzuela
- Developed by: Lucero Suárez; José Rubén Núñez
- Written by: Luis Reynoso; Guillermo Orta
- Directed by: Héctor Márquez; Carlos Santos
- Starring: Eva Cedeño; Mario Morán; Eduardo Santamarina; Erika Buenfil; César Évora; Nuria Bages; Alejandro Ibarra; Juan Diego Covarrubias; Oscar Bonfiglio; Rodrigo Vidal
- Theme music composer: Jorge Domínguez
- Opening theme: "Sabor a ti" by Alex Fernández
- Composer: Christian Moreno
- Country of origin: Mexico
- Original language: Spanish
- No. of seasons: 1
- No. of episodes: 44

Production
- Executive producer: Lucero Suárez
- Producer: Ángel Villaverde
- Cinematography: Rodrigo Rodríguez; Víctor Dávila
- Editors: Rodrigo Morales; Socorro Manrique
- Camera setup: Multi-camera
- Production company: TelevisaUnivision

Original release
- Network: Las Estrellas
- Release: 21 September 2026 – present

Sabor a ti (English: A Taste of You) is a Mexican telenovela produced by Lucero Suárez for TelevisaUnivision. It is based on the 2000 Chilean telenovela of the same name, created by José Ignacio Valenzuela. The series stars Eva Cedeño and Mario Morán. It premiered on Las Estrellas on 21 September 2026.

== Plot ==
Ángela Herrera is an agronomist and winemaker who receives the news that her maternal grandmother, Rosa, is on her deathbed. Although her mother, Margarita, objects to her traveling to Montealegre, Ángela decides to return. For the past 27 years, Margarita has been unable to forgive her mother for cheating on her father with Vicente Sarmiento, the owner of Viña El Embrujo. Upon arriving, Ángela discovers that Mariano Romero lives in Rosa's house with his mother, Filomena, and that he is also Vicente's right-hand man. Mariano is also engaged to Lucero, a young blind woman whom Rosa adopted and raised as her own daughter. After Rosa's death, Lucero gives Ángela her diary, in which she discovers that her family was robbed of a secret formula created by her grandfather. The discovery drives her to reclaim that secret, as the formula is what makes El Embrujo produce the best wine in the region.

During the grape harvest and Montealegre's patron saint festival, Ángela meets Tomás Sarmiento, Vicente's grandson and director of Viña Sarmiento, with whom she will try to uncover the truth. However, jealousy and selfishness tears their relationship apart, while the bond between Ángela and Mariano grows stronger. Mariano have to face a dilemma: keep his promise to marry Lucero or give in to his attraction to Ángela. When things seem complicated enough, Isabel Mandujano arrives in Montealegre. Fascinated by Mariano, she becomes obsessed and will resort to fraud, blackmail, and manipulation to destroy his relationship with Ángela.

== Cast ==
=== Main ===
- Eva Cedeño as Ángela Herrera
- Mario Morán as Mariano Romero
- Eduardo Santamarina as Maximiliano "Max" Sarmiento
- Erika Buenfil as Josefina Montero "Chata"
- César Évora as Vicente Sarmiento
- Nuria Bages as Pilar Zambrano
- Alejandro Ibarra as Juan Solano
- Juan Diego Covarrubias as Tomás Sarmiento
- Oscar Bonfiglio as Father Pedro Solano
- Rodrigo Vidal as Segundo Irigoyen
- Lisset as Filomena Hurtado
- Arturo Carmona as Javier Ugarte
- Christian Ramos as Ramón "Moncho" Portillo
- Armando Hernández as Fidel Ordoñez
- Pilar Ixquic Mata as Margarita Quevedo
- Ara Saldívar as Lucero Camacho
- Daniela Álvarez as Antonia Sarmiento
- Edsa Ramírez as Amparo Mena
- Sachi Tamashiro as Diana Ambriz
- Ana Karen Parra as Virginia Solano
- Federico Espejo as Bernabé Solano
- Luis Enrique Duval as Julián Solano
- Alex Carabias as Pablo "Roca" Sarmiento
- Regina Palacio as Tamara Irigoyen
- Facundo Castro as Amador Irigoyen
- Renata Romo as Rafaela
- Palmeira Cruz as Violeta Martínez
- Sabik Salazar as Concepción "Conchita" Martínez
- Marcela Guzmán as Nuvia

=== Recurring and guest stars ===
- Eugenia Cauduro as Rosa
- Regina Villaverde as Elisa Ugarte
- Emilio Landagaray as Miguel Prieto "Larva"
- Sugey Abrego as Mabel
- Cinthia Aparicio as Isabel Mandujano

== Production ==
In February 2026, Eva Cedeño and Mario Morán were cast in the lead role of Sabor a ti. Filming of the telenovela took place from 9 March 2026 to 1 September 2026.

== Ratings ==
Viewership and ratings per season of Sabor a ti
Season	Timeslot (CT)	Episodes	First aired		Last aired		Avg. viewers (millions)
Season	Timeslot (CT)	Episodes	Date	Viewers (millions)	Date	Viewers (millions)	Avg. viewers (millions)
1	Mon–Fri 8:30 p.m.	41	21 September 2026	4.12	TBA	TBD	4.24

== Episodes ==
No.	Title	Original release date	Mexico viewers (millions)
1	"No tienes derecho de juzgarme"	21 September 2026 (Note: Premiered early online through Las Estrellas website on 18 September 2026.)	4.12
2	"Usted se aprovechó de mi abuela"	22 September 2026	4.58
3	"Respeten la memoria de mi abuela"	23 September 2026	4.58
4	"Hay algo en ti que me atrapa"	24 September 2026	4.10
5	"¿Estos signos revelan el secreto del vino?"	25 September 2026	4.92
6	"¿Tienes algo que ver con don Maximiliano Sarmiento?"	28 September 2026	4.36
7	"¿Soy hijo de Maximiliano?"	29 September 2026	4.31
8	"¡Julián es mi hijo!"	30 September 2026	4.28
9	"Perdóname Julián"	1 October 2026	4.19
10	"¿Juan es un asesino?"	2 October 2026	4.49
11	"No le eres indiferente"	5 October 2026	4.04
12	"Acepto ser tu novia"	6 October 2026	4.18
13	"¡Te odio Vicente Sarmiento!"	7 October 2026	4.63
14	"Véngate de Vicente Sarmiento"	8 October 2026	4.22
15	"Me arrebataste el cariño de mi abuelo"	9 October 2026	3.99
16	"Voy a impugnar el testamento"	12 October 2026	4.31
17	"Eres la dueña"	13 October 2026	4.51
18	"Deja de tratarme como enemiga"	14 October 2026	N/A
19	"Conquista a Mariano"	15 October 2026	4.21
20	"Estuviste con Ángela y me mentiste"	16 October 2026	4.33
21	"Besó a Ángela"	19 October 2026	4.51
22	"Me voy para siempre"	20 October 2026	4.81
23	"Se casan el próximo sábado"	21 October 2026	4.26
24	"Hay secretos que pesan más que el oro"	22 October 2026	4.72
25	"El secreto de El Embrujo"	23 October 2026	4.14
26	"Aquí está el secreto del vino"	26 October 2026	4.24
27	"Esta boda no se llevará a cabo"	27 October 2026	4.13
28	"Mariano me disparó"	28 October 2026	3.85
29	"Voy a refundirlo en la cárcel"	29 October 2026	4.30
30	"¿Y si en realidad Lucero puede ver?"	30 October 2026	3.97
31	"¡Papá, Julián es tu hijo!"	2 November 2026	3.40
32	"Soy la dueña absoluta"	3 November 2026	4.23
33	"El sacrificio de Lucero termina en cenizas"	4 November 2026	4.12
34	"Yo quemé los documentos"	5 November 2026	4.12
35	"¡Nadie se ríe de mí!"	6 November 2026	4.26
36	"Alguien intenta aterrorizar a Ángela"	9 November 2026	4.09
37	"¿Quién está embarazada?"	10 November 2026	4.29
38	"Amor a primera vista"	11 November 2026	4.32
39	"No eres hijo de Max Sarmiento"	12 November 2026	4.01
40	"¡¿Qué haces en mi cama?!"	13 November 2026	4.06
41	"Se cancela la boda"	16 November 2026	3.83
42	"¿Quién la mató?"	17 November 2026	3.93
43	"Vi el fantasma de Amparo"	18 November 2026	TBD
44	"Los muertos no escriben letreros"	19 November 2026	TBD
