= Monteverde (TV series) =

- Genre: Telenovela
- Based on: Isla Paraíso by Alejandro Cabrera
- Developed by: Lucero Suárez; Jimena Merodio
- Written by: Luis Reynoso; Guillermo Orta
- Directed by: Héctor Márquez; Jorge Robles
- Starring: Gabriel Soto; África Zavala; Cynthia Klitbo; Alejandro Ibarra; Ana Patricia Rojo; Arturo Carmona; Óscar Bonfiglio
- Theme music composer: Jordi Bachbush; Luis Angel Franco Rivera
- Opening theme: "Que Se Enteren De Una Vez" by Luis Angel "El Flaco"
- Composer: Christian Moreno
- Country of origin: Mexico
- Original language: Spanish
- No. of seasons: 1
- No. of episodes: 87

Production
- Executive producer: Lucero Suárez
- Producer: Ángel Villaverde
- Editors: Rodrigo Morales; Socorro Manrique
- Camera setup: Multi-camera
- Production company: TelevisaUnivision

Original release
- Network: Las Estrellas
- Release: 16 June – 12 October 2025

Monteverde is a Mexican telenovela produced by Lucero Suárez for TelevisaUnivision. It is based on the 2018 Chilean telenovela Isla Paraíso, created by Alejandro Cabrera. The series stars África Zavala and Gabriel Soto. It aired on Las Estrellas from 16 June 2025 to 12 October 2025.

== Plot ==
The telenovela is set in Monteverde, a quiet and quaint town, inhabited only by men, where time seems to have stopped; however, under its peaceful facade lie secrets and conflicts that, when discovered, will forever transform the lives of its inhabitants.

The story begins when Carolina Robles, a wife and mother dedicated to her family, has to flee after being incriminated by her corrupt husband, Carlos Rojas, in a fraud he committed. Not knowing where to go, she turns to her twin sister for help; Celeste, a nun devoted to her religion. Celeste is about to fulfill a mission together with Father Gabriel in Monteverde called "Operation Genesis", a project aimed at reviving the town, which explains the arrival of a bus full of women. This is how Carolina, who has adopted the identity of Celeste, arrives in Monteverde to take refuge with her son Andrés and his nanny Juanita, who has accompanied Carolina on the journey.

Carolina tries to stay hidden, but everything gets complicated when she meets Óscar León, a man marked by the abandonment of his wife Eva. Although Óscar tries to keep his distance, he ends up falling in love with Carolina. However, their relationship faces serious challenges: the secret about Carolina's true identity, the reasons why she came to Monteverde, and her decision to pass herself off as a nun. The worst of all is that her husband, Carlos, will not rest until he finds her, endangering everything she has built.

Operation Genesis opens the door to other love stories, such as that of Juan David and Angelina, Franco and Lucía, and Lucas and Rosalía.

== Cast ==
- Gabriel Soto as Óscar León
- África Zavala as Carolina Robles / Sister Celeste
- Cynthia Klitbo as Gloria Domínguez
- Alejandro Ibarra as Father Gabriel Farías
- Ana Patricia Rojo as Eva
- Arturo Carmona as Néstor Serrano
- Óscar Bonfiglio as Manuel Toro
- Mario Morán as Franco León
- Fernanda Urdapilleta as Lucía Cohen
- Aldo Guerra as Juan David Farías
- Ana Karen Parra as Angelina Salazar
- Ara Saldívar as Rosalía Gallegos
- Manuel Riguezza as Lucas Bandini
- Ximena Martínez as Juana "Juanita" Ortega
- Christian Ramos as Hugo Toro
- Claudia Acosta as Doris
- Archie Balardi as Cárcamo
- Paulette Hernández as Julieta Torres
- María Alicia Delgado as Mother Gustava Río Seco
- Rodrigo Álvarez as Moisés León
- Mateo Juniel García as Andrés Rojas Robles
- Fernanda Bernal as Paulina
- Marcela Guzmán as Trinidad
- Marcelo Córdoba as Carlos Rojas
- Carlos Gatica as Diego Bandini
- Silvia Valdez
- Magdaleno Trujillo
- Rocío de Santiago as Erika Beltrán
- Ricardo de Pascual as Rogelio Diaz / Father Cucho
- Ricardo Fastlicht as Father Guillermo

== Production ==
In January 2025, Gabriel Soto announced he had been cast in Monterverde and that production had held its first table read. On 13 February 2025, África Zavala was announced in the lead role. Filming of the telenovela began on 26 February 2025, with the rest of the cast being announced as well. Juan Pablo Velasco was initially cast for the role of Andrés; however, he had to drop out the telenovela due to a hip bacterium and was replaced by Mateo Juniel.

== Episodes ==
No.	Title	Original release date	Mexico viewers (millions)
1	"Tenemos que irnos de aquí"	16 June 2025 (Note: Premiered early online through Las Estrellas website on 13 June 2025.)	5.01
2	"¿Y esto hermana Celeste?"	17 June 2025	5.06
3	"Tus prejuicios pueden más que la razón"	18 June 2025	4.81
4	"Prueba de ADN"	19 June 2025	4.88
5	"Es usted muy bonita"	20 June 2025	4.83
6	"Consígueme un abogado"	23 June 2025	4.65
7	"Carta de Eva"	24 June 2025	5.00
8	"Nos abandonó por otro hombre"	25 June 2025	4.91
9	"Lo hice para ayudar a Carolina"	26 June 2025	4.78
10	"Mi padrino se enamoró"	27 June 2025	4.35
11	"No soy la hermana Celeste"	30 June 2025	5.04
12	"Me parece encantador"	1 July 2025	5.41
13	"Me enamoré de ti"	2 July 2025	5.17
14	"Una verdad dolorosa"	3 July 2025	5.27
15	"Somos el uno para el otro"	4 July 2025	5.27
16	"Este corazón es suyo"	7 July 2025	4.81
17	"Eva, volviste"	8 July 2025	5.18
18	"¿Qué haces aquí? ¡Lárgate!"	9 July 2025	5.04
19	"No soy monja"	10 July 2025	5.04
20	"Tu realidad es esta"	11 July 2025	4.46
21	"Óscar besa a Celeste"	14 July 2025	4.58
22	"Lo nuestro fue un error"	15 July 2025	4.85
23	"Perdóname hijo"	16 July 2025	5.03
24	"Aléjate de Oscar León"	17 July 2025	5.11
25	"Nunca hubo amor"	18 July 2025	5.54
26	"¿Ese amor podrá revivir?"	21 July 2025	5.26
27	"Fui una ilusa"	22 July 2025	5.14
28	"¡Lo amo!"	23 July 2025	4.50
29	"Estoy dispuesto a esperarla"	24 July 2025	4.59
30	"Estoy enamorado de otra mujer"	25 July 2025	4.69
31	"¿Quiere ser mi novia?"	28 July 2025	4.63
32	"Necesito pedirte perdón"	29 July 2025	4.96
33	"Te perdono"	30 July 2025	4.97
34	"Eva y Néstor fueron amantes"	31 July 2025	5.37
35	"Quiero saber la verdad"	1 August 2025	4.62
36	"Andrés es todo para mí"	4 August 2025	4.69
37	"Nos vamos a dar una oportunidad"	5 August 2025	4.90
38	"Se me acabó el tiempo"	6 August 2025	4.78
39	"Carlos te encontró"	7 August 2025	4.55
40	"Usted es Carolina Robles"	8 August 2025	4.70
41	"¿Ordenaste destruir la escuela?"	11 August 2025	4.38
42	"Lo nuestro llegó hasta aquí"	12 August 2025	5.37
43	"No se puede vender"	13 August 2025	4.86
44	"Le marqué a don Carlos"	14 August 2025	4.87
45	"Me acosté con ella"	15 August 2025	4.54
46	"Eres un traidor"	18 August 2025	4.88
47	"Prueba de ADN"	19 August 2025	5.09
48	"No abandonaré mi vocación religiosa"	20 August 2025	4.82
49	"Te vi besándote con Oscar"	21 August 2025	4.92
50	"Lucas es mi hijo"	22 August 2025	4.72
51	"Lucas no puede ser mi hermano"	25 August 2025	4.91
52	"Es momento de que se reconcilien"	26 August 2025	4.96
53	"Me llamo Carolina Robles"	27 August 2025	5.23
54	"Me enamoré de una mujer que no existe"	28 August 2025	5.13
55	"La escuela no se va abrir"	29 August 2025	5.12
56	"Aquí no son bienvenidas"	1 September 2025	4.84
57	"Me voy a entregar"	2 September 2025	5.21
58	"Pedir perdón no es suficiente"	3 September 2025	4.74
59	"Puede comprobar su inocencia"	4 September 2025	5.19
60	"¿Están en Zacatillo?"	5 September 2025	4.80
61	"Es la mamá de Moisés"	8 September 2025	4.86
62	"Queda usted detenida"	9 September 2025	4.79
63	"Cuenten con mi ayuda"	10 September 2025	5.04
64	"Moisés es mi hijo"	11 September 2025	5.42
65	"Eres la mamá de Moisés"	12 September 2025	4.83
66	"¡Soy tu mamá, Moisés!"	15 September 2025	N/A
67	"No tengas miedo padrino"	16 September 2025	4.96
68	"No es una competencia"	17 September 2025	4.88
69	"Lo sigo amando"	18 September 2025	5.31
70	"No me quiero separar de mi padrino"	19 September 2025	4.80
71	"Sigue enamorado de ti"	22 September 2025	4.92
72	"Nos vamos a juicio"	23 September 2025	5.09
73	"Es cáncer"	24 September 2025	3.83
74	"Mi vida es a su lado"	25 September 2025	5.53
75	"Va a quedar libre de culpa"	26 September 2025	5.35
76	"No aceptó las pruebas"	29 September 2025	5.20
77	"¡Me mentiste Carlos!"	30 September 2025	4.94
78	"Sácame de aquí"	1 October 2025	5.08
79	"Cambio de identidades"	2 October 2025	4.80
80	"Las dos van a ir a la cárcel"	3 October 2025	5.36
81	"¿Aceptaría ser mi esposa?"	6 October 2025	5.77
82	"Carolina Robles de León"	7 October 2025	5.30
83	"¡Carolina Robles es culpable!"	8 October 2025	5.26
84	"¡Celeste, perdóname!"	9 October 2025	5.18
85	"No soy Carolina, soy su hermana Celeste"	10 October 2025	5.30
86	"Nunca quise hacerte daño"	12 October 2025	4.49
87	"Somos marido y mujer"	12 October 2025	4.49

== Reception ==
=== Ratings ===
Viewership and ratings per season of Monteverde
Season	Timeslot (CT)	Episodes	First aired		Last aired		Avg. viewers (millions)
Season	Timeslot (CT)	Episodes	Date	Viewers (millions)	Date	Viewers (millions)	Avg. viewers (millions)
1	Mon–Fri 8:30 p.m.	85	16 June 2025	5.01	12 October 2025	4.49	4.96

=== Awards and nominations ===
Year	Award	Category	Nominated	Result	Ref
2026	Produ Awards	Best Lead Actress - Romantic Telenovela	África Zavala	Pending	
2026	Produ Awards	Best Supporting Actress - Family or Romantic Telenovela	Ara Saldívar	Pending	
2026	Produ Awards	Best Supporting Actor - Family or Romantic Telenovela	Mario Morán	Pending	
