= Erika Buenfil =

Mexican actress (born 1963)

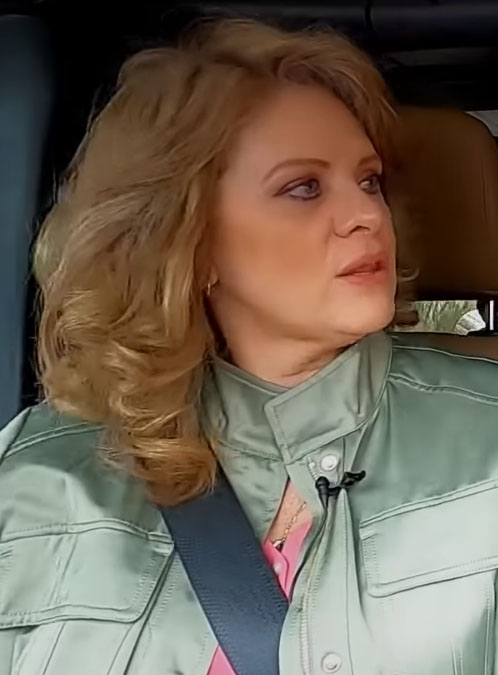
- Born: Teresa de Jesús Buenfil López; 23 November 1963 (age 62); Monterrey, Nuevo León, Mexico
- Occupations: Actress, singer
- Years active: 1974–present
- Children: 1

Teresa de Jesús Buenfil López (Spanish pronunciation: [teˈɾesa ðe xeˈsus βweɱˈfil ˈlopes]; born November 23, 1963), commonly known as Erika Buenfil, is a Mexican actress, TV host and singer. She is best known for her lead roles in several successful telenovelas including Amor en Silencio (1988), Marisol (1996), Tres mujeres (1999–2000) and Amores verdaderos (2012–2013). Since September 2019, Buenfil has run a YouTube channel named as 'Sazonando con la Buenfil'.

== Biography ==
=== Early career ===
Buenfil started her career in show business at the age of 11. Her first telenovela appearance was in 1977 in Acompañame. More roles followed in Ambicion, alongside Edith Gonzalez; Conflictos de un Medico alongside Victoria Ruffo; and Aprendiendo a Amar alongside Susana Dosamantes. An outstanding role was Cristina del Junco in the telenovela El derecho de nacer in 1981, which gave Buenfil international exposure as an upcoming young actress. In 1983 she played the role of Vicky de Martino in El Maleficio. The success of the novela gave Buenfil her first starring role in 1985 in Angelica, where she played the title character. At this point, she became recognizable in Latin America thanks to her success in novelas and hosting the Mexican show XETU. The following year, in 1986, Buenfil starred in El Engaño, alongside Frank Moro, Guillermo Garcia Cantu, and Luz Maria Jerez.

=== Amor en silencio ===
Two years later, in 1988, Buenfil appeared in Amor en silencio. This was her third starring role and the most memorable. She played two characters; Marisela in the first half, and Ana in the second half of the telenovela. Her leading men were Arturo Peniche and Omar Fierro. Amor en silencio, produced by Carla Estrada, became an instant hit due to the cast and the well-written storyline. However, her character was killed in a surprise twist during one episode. The story continued with the plot progressing 12 years, and emerged with Buenfil reappearing in the story, now playing the teenage daughter of her former murdered character.

Amor en silencio was the most awarded telenovela of the year, winning Best Telenovela and Best Actress for Erika Buenfil in 1989's TVyNovela awards. During this time, Buenfil's popularity had grown and her status as telenovela actress was at its highest. She made appearances in many entertainment magazines and on TV shows.

=== 1990s ===
After her success with Amor en silencio, Buenfil took a few years off from telenovelas before returning in 1991 in Vida Robada alongside Sergio Goyri and Cynthia Klitbo. The telenovela had some success, but after it ended Buenfil disappeared from the spotlight once again. In 1993, she was being considered for the lead role of Monica in the epic novela Corazón salvaje, but the role went to Edith González. Buenfil was offered the part of the antagonist, "Aimee," but she initially refused it. In 1996, Buenfil admitted on El Show de Cristina that she had refused the role because she wanted to be the star and did not want to accept a secondary role. She said that she changed her mind over the weekend, but when she called the producer Jose Rendón, she was told that the role had already been given to actress Ana Colchero.

=== Marisol ===
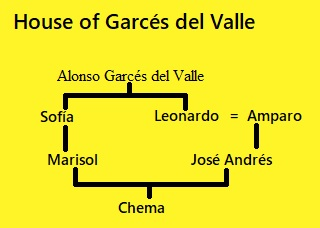
The family tree of Marisol, who is one of the most famous characters played by Buenfil

By the end of 1995, Buenfil had been absent from the TV screen for over four years. However, her fortune changed when she went to Televisa to ask for better treatment at the company. Her voice was heard and producer Juan Osorio wanted her to star in his upcoming production of Marisol alongside Eduardo Santamarina, in his first starring role. To the surprise of many, Marisol was a great hit with audiences, thanks to the great chemistry between the lead actors. It was a typical Cinderella-type story, criticized by many, but that brought much success. The success of the telenovela was such that Buenfil and Santamarina went on a promotional tour of various Latin American countries.

=== Tres Mujeres ===
After the success of Marisol, Buenfil did some theater, made a special appearance in her friend Laura Flores' vehicle El Alma No Tiene Color, and was offered various scripts, including starring in 1998's La Usurpadora. She declined and the role went to Venezuelan Gabriela Spanic.

The next year, in 1999, Buenfil found herself headlining the cast of the novela Tres Mujeres, where she shared the lead with Karyme Lozano and Jorge Salinas, in their first starring roles. Even though Televisa placed the novela in a non-prime time slot, Tres Mujeres delivered better than the network's other primetime soaps. The show covered previous taboo issues in Latin American TV, such as homosexuality and adultery. The role of Barbara was also the first time Buenfil played a mature woman who committed infidelity. Due to the success of the novela, the cast of Tres Mujeres was asked to continue working on the novela, even though filming had ended. Eventually the novela lasted over eight months (most last a little over four months).

=== 2000s ===
In 2000 Buenfil had a special participation in the children's novela Carita De Angel. In 2001 she started working on a new novela, Asi Son Ellas. Originally, Victoria Ruffo was also tapped to work on the novela, but controversy started regarding who would carry the first billing and eventually Ruffo withdrew from the project. The novela was not very successful in part because of the difficult afternoon schedule and because Televisa did not promote it well, delaying over a year to air it in Mexico.

In 2004, Buenfil starred in Corazones Al Limite. This telenovela was memorable because it reunited the Amor en silencio stars as lovers for the first time in 16 years. That same year Buenfil also had a small role as a villain in Amarte Es Mi Pecado. In 2006, she had an important role as the mother of the heroine in Duelo De Pasiones, produced by Marisol's producer Juan Osorio, and starring Ludwika Paleta and Pablo Montero. In 2008. she joined the cast of another Osorio telenovela, Tormenta en el Paraiso. In 2010, she had a secondary role in El Triunfo del Amor. This role was Buenfil's last before she returned to starring roles.

=== 2010s ===
In June 2012, after an exhausting casting battle over the lead role in the telenovela Amores Verdaderos, Erika Buenfil was selected as the heroine. This marked her comeback as the lead star of a telenovela after eight years of not having a lead role. Her last one had been in Corazones al Limite in 2004. Other actresses who fought for the role were Rebecca Jones, Victoria Ruffo, Maribel Guardia, and Olivia Collins.

Amores Verdaderos debuted in prime time to high ratings in Mexico. Because of its success, the network extended its run until May 2013. For the role of Victoria Balvanera Gil de Brizz, Buenfil won the TVyNovelas award for best lead actress.

In 2014, Buenfil returned to television with a starring role in La Gata. On August 22, 2015 she performed in the Symphony Broadway Theater, acting as Fabiola in Infidelidades alongside Laura Flores, Alfredo Adame, Natasha Dupeyron, and Omar Fierro.

In 2015, Buenfil returned to television with a starring role in A que no me dejas, a remake of the telenovela she had led 26 years before; Amor en silencio. She was reunited with Arturo Peniche who was her partner in the successful telenovela they starred in during 1989.

=== Personal life ===
In 2005, Buenfil became a mother, having given birth to Nicolás de Jesús. Controversy followed when the press pressured her to mention the name of the child's father, which she refused to do. She later revealed that the father of her child is the son of Mexican ex-president Ernesto Zedillo. When asked how her relationship with the father of her child is, she said in 2011 that "it does not exist. Doesn't know where he is, he knows nothing."

She appeared on many TV shows such as Cristina and Don Francisco Presenta, where she talked about the hardships on being a single mother in the TV industry, but said she was going through the happiest time of her life being a mother to her child. On July 10, 2007, Erika Buenfil's mother Maria Martha died after complications from a rare disease that affected her heart.

== Filmography ==
=== Films ===
Year	Title	Role	Notes
1981	El sexo de los ricos	Motorcycle Girl	Uncredited
1982	Cosa fácil	Amiga de Elena	Uncredited
1985	Cementerio del terror	Lena	
1987	Noche de terrock y brujas	Chelo Derecho	TV film
1989	Cita con la muerte	Julieta	
1989	Ladrones de tumbas	Rebeca de la Huerta	
1992	El prófugo	Karla	
2014	Of Boys and Planes	Mom	Short film

=== Television ===
Year	Title	Role	Notes
1977-1978	Acompáñame		Supporting role
1979	La llama de tu amor		Supporting role
1979	Lágrimas negras	Verónica	Main cast
1979	El amor llegó más tarde		Supporting role
1979	Añoranza		Supporting role
1980	Conflictos de un médico		Supporting role
1980	Ambición	Iris	Main cast
1980-1981	Aprendiendo a amar	Natalia Peñaranda	Main cast
1981-1982	El derecho de nacer	Cristina del Junco	Main cast
1982	XE-TU	Host	Main cast
1983-1984	El maleficio	Vicky de Martino	Main cast
1985	Angélica	Angélica	Lead role
1986	El engaño	Marcela Estévez	Lead role
1988	Amor en silencio	Marisela Ocampo / Ana Silva	Lead role
1991-1992	Vida robada	Gabriela Durán / Leticia Avelar	Lead role
1995-2003	Mujer, casos de la vida real	Patricia Ramírez / Martha Carolina	3 episodes
1996	Marisol	Marisol Garcés del Valle / Verónica Soriano	Lead role
1997	El alma no tiene color	Diana Alcántara	Guest role
1999-2000	Tres mujeres	Bárbara Uriarte Espinoza	Lead role
2000	Carita de ángel	Policarpia Zambrano	Guest role
2002-2003	Así son ellas	Dalia Marcelín	Lead role
2004	Amarte es mi pecado	Gisela López Monfort	Recurring role
2004	Corazones al límite	Pilar De La Reguera	Lead role
2006	Duelo de pasiones	Soledad Montellano	Lead role
2007	Amor sin maquillaje	Laura	Guest role
2007-2008	Tormenta en el paraíso	Patsy Sandoval	Guest role
2008	La rosa de Guadalupe	Cielo	Episode: "Jamás secuestrarán tu alma"
2008	Mañana es para siempre	Monserrat Rivera de Elizalde	Guest role
2009	Los simuladores	Sra. Valdéz	Episode: "El baquetón"
2009-2010	Mar de amor	Casilda	Main cast
2010-2011	Triunfo del amor	Antonieta Orozco	Main cast
2012-2013	Amores verdaderos	Victoria Balvanera	Lead role
2014	La Gata	Blanca de la Santacruz / "Fela la loca"	Main cast
2015–2016	A que no me dejas	Angélica Medina	Main cast
2017	La doble vida de Estela Carrillo	Mercy Cabrera	Main cast
2019	Por amar sin ley	Camila Balcázar	Guest role
2020	Te doy la vida	Andrea Espinoza	Main cast
2020	Selena: The Series	Cristina Saralegui	Guest role
2021	la mexicana y el güero	Dr. Mónica Traven	Guest role
2021	Vencer el pasado	Carmen	Lead role
2023	Perdona nuestros pecados	Estela Cáceres	Lead role
2024	Fugitivas, en busca de la libertad	Martha Pineda "La Superiora"	Lead role
2025	La CQ: nuevo ingreso	Maricela Limantour	Episode: "Guerra de gemelos"
2025	Papás por siempre	Gisela	Main cast
2026	Sabor a ti	Josefina Montero "Chata"	Main cast

== Albums ==
Se Busca un Corazón (1986)

1. "Ya no te Amo más"
2. "El Amor es un niño pequeño"
3. "Esa Balada de Amor"
4. "Se busca un Corazón"
5. "El Engaño"
6. "Perdóname"
7. "Tras de Ti"
8. "Jamas"
9. "Es como un Sueño"
10. "Llorando por El"

Soy Mujer (1987)

1. "Tu Amor a medias no me Interesa"
2. "La Noche no es para Mí"
3. "Crucero Mediterráneo"
4. "Amarte"
5. "Ramito de Violetas"
6. "Pon Otra vez ese Disco"
7. "La Moda Juvenil"
8. "Groenlandia"
9. "Soy Mujer"
10. "Sin Amor"

Cerca de Ti (1990)

1. "Vuelve Pronto"
2. "Mi Rey"
3. "Cerca de Ti"
4. "Rayo de Luna"

Bonus tracks:

1. "Despertar al Amor"
2. "Despertar al Amor"

== Awards and nominations ==
Year	Awards	Category	Program/telenovela	Result
1983	TVyNovelas Awards	Best Presenter	Xe-Tú	Won
1984	TVyNovelas Awards	Best Female Revelation	El maleficio	Nominated
1989	TVyNovelas Awards	Best Young Lead Actress	Amor en silencio	Won
1992	TVyNovelas Awards	Best Lead Actress	Vida robada	Nominated
1997	TVyNovelas Awards	Best Lead Actress	Marisol	Nominated
2000	TVyNovelas Awards	Best Lead Actress	Tres mujeres	Nominated
2013	Premios People en Español	Best Actress	Amores Verdaderos	Nominated
2014	TVyNovelas Awards	Best Lead Actress	Amores Verdaderos	Won
2014	Los favoritos del publico	Favorite Slap in Marjorie de Sousa	Amores Verdaderos	Won
2014	Los favoritos del publico	Favorite Couple with Eduardo Yáñez	Amores Verdaderos	Won
2014	Los favoritos del publico	Favorite Kiss with Eduardo Yáñez	Amores Verdaderos	Nominated
