= Nuria Bages =

Mexican actress (born 1950)

- Born: Nuria Bages Romo; December 23, 1950 (age 75)
- Occupation: Actress
- Years active: 1980–present
- Children: 1

Nuria Bages (Spanish pronunciation: [ˈnuɾja ˈβaxes] born Nuria Bages Romo on December 23, 1950) is a Mexican actress better known for her work in television and the stage.

Active in Mexican television since the early 1980s, Bages became a household name after winning the role of Silvina in the long-running sitcom Dr. Cándido Pérez, opposite Jorge Ortiz de Pinedo. With the married Pinedo she had long and tumultuous sentimental relationship that ended after the show went off the air.

In 1993, she resumed her career in telenovelas playing María Inés in Los parientes probres and has remained active since.

== Filmography ==
=== Films ===
Year	Title	Role	Notes
1984	Delincuente	Cecilia's mother	
1989	Vacaciones de terror	Lorena	
1991	Cándido Pérez, especialista en señoras	Silvina Pérez	
1992	Cándido de día, Pérez de noche	Silvina Pérez	Sequel

=== Television ===
Year	Title	Role	Notes
1980	Soledad	Cynthia	Supporting role
1981	Otra vuelta de tuerca	Señorita Jessel	
1982	Vanessa	Laura	Supporting role
1982	Bianca Vidal	Adriana	Supporting role
1983-1984	La Fiera	Elena de Martinez Bustamante	Supporting role
1983	Amalia Batista	Margarita	Supporting role
1984	Los años felices	Daniela	Supporting role
1985	Vivir un poco	Alfonsina Dávalos De Larrea	Supporting role
1985	Seducción	Unknown Character	
1987	Cómo duele callar	Eugenia	Lead role
1987-1993	Dr. Cándido Pérez	Silvina Pérez	
1988	El pecado de Oyuki	Reneé Sagan	Supporting role
1993	Los parientes pobres	María Inés de Santos	Main role
1995	Bajo un mismo rostro	Laura	Main role
1996	Canción de amor	Nora	Supporting role
1996	Mi querida Isabel	Sagrario	Main role
1997	Mujer, casos de la vida real	Natalia	"Fiesta inolvidable" (season 13, episode 38)
1998	La usurpadora	Paula Martínez	Guest star
1999	Cuento de Navidad	Various roles	Guest star
1998–1999	El privilegio de amar	Miriam Arango	Main role
2001	El manantial	Eloísa Castañeda / Martha Castañeda	Supporting role
2002	Las vías del amor	Olga Vázquez de Gutiérrez	Supporting role
2004	Corazones al límite	Dra. Gertrudis	Supporting role
2004	Amar otra vez	Esperanza Suárez González	Supporting role
2005	Pablo y Andrea	Gertrudis	Supporting role
2006	Heridas de amor	Fernanda de Aragón	Main role
2007	La fea más bella	Esposa Desesperada	Guest star
2008	Querida enemiga	Madre Asunción	Supporting role
2008	Alma de hierro	Mamá de Rita	Guest star
2008–2009	Mujeres asesinas	Ofelia Oropeza / Lorena González	"Sonia, desalmada" (season 1, episode 1); "Ofelia, enamorada" (season 1, episode 9)
2012	Por ella soy Eva	Actress	Guest star
2012–2013	Porque el amor manda	Teté Corcuera	Guest star
2013	Mentir para vivir	Fidelia Bretón	Supporting role
2014	El color de la pasión	Aída Lugo	Guest star
2016	Tres veces Ana	Leonor	Supporting role
2017	Enamorándome de Ramón	Hortensia	Main role
2019	El corazón nunca se equivoca	Nora Ortega	Supporting role
2020	Te doy la vida	Ester	Supporting role
2021-2022	S.O.S me estoy enamorando	Delia	Supporting role
2023	Tierra de esperanza	Remedios	Supporting role
2024-2025	Las hijas de la señora García	Rocío Lara	Supporting role
2025	Doménica Montero	Mercedes Lara	
2026	Sabor a ti	Pilar Zambrano	

== Awards and nominations ==
=== Premios TVyNovelas ===
Year	Category	Telenovela	Result
1986	Best Co-star Actress	Vivir un poco	Won
2003	Best Co-star Actress	Las vías del amor	Nominated
