= Mi querida herencia =

Mexican television series

- Genre: Sitcom
- Written by: Enrique González; Martha García; Carmen Castro; Jorge Garza; David Hernández; Elías Solorio; Julio Jamal; Juan Carlos Becerril
- Directed by: Jorge Garza
- Starring: Paul Stanley; Roxana Castellanos
- Country of origin: Mexico
- Original language: Spanish
- No. of seasons: 3
- No. of episodes: 37

Production
- Executive producer: Elías Solorio
- Production company: Televisa

Original release
- Network: Las Estrellas
- Release: 29 August 2019 – 1 July 2021

Mi querida herencia is a Mexican comedy television series produced by Elías Solorio for Televisa that premiered on Las Estrellas on 29 August 2019. The series stars Paul Stanley and Roxana Castellanos.

The series has been renewed for a third season, that premiered on April 15, 2021.

== Plot ==
Carlos Fernández de León is a partying and irresponsible man who lives off his father's money. When he dies, his father decides to leave his fortune to Carlos, with one condition: he must get married. Otherwise, the inheritance would go to the hands of his cousin Diego, an ambitious man, capable of everything for money. Carlos fulfills the condition imposed on him by his father and marries Deyanira, a waitress with a brother and sister and severe economic problems. Carlos never imagined that the will would have a clause stipulating that his marriage should last a minimum of 5 years.

In the second season, Carlos and Deyanira continue to pretend that they love each other and maintain a solid relationship. Diego now seeks to divorce them and keep the money, next to his faithful and innocent squire, Matías. Pamela, Carlos's ex-girlfriend, after finding out about this marriage, will seek to separate them, as she does not overcome that Carlos has chosen Deyanira and not her as his wife.

== Cast ==
- Paul Stanley as Carlos Fernández de León "Charly"
- Roxana Castellanos as Deyanira Rubí
- Bárbara Islas as Britny
- Luz Aldán as Jeny (season 1)
- Luis Orozco as Matías
- Agustín Arana as Diego Ruíz
- Mauricio Mancera as Javier
- Macaria as Pilar
- Ceci Flores as Dayana
- Alexander Tavizón as Max
- Patricio Castillo as Gregorio
- Eva Cedeño as Pamela (season 2)
- Édgar Vivar as Notario (guest, season 1; main, season 2)
- Natalia Madera as Escarlet (guest, season 2; main, season 3)

== Episodes ==
=== Series overview ===
Series	Episodes	Originally released	
Series	Episodes	First released	Last released
1	13	29 August 2019	21 November 2019
2	12	5 October 2020	21 December 2020
3	12	15 April 2021	1 July 2021

=== Season 1 (2019) ===
No. overall	No. in season	Title	Original release date
1	1	"Boda express"	29 August 2019
Carlos can only receive his father's inheritance of 80 million dollars if he gets married. Deyanira, a waitress indebted, will coincide with him at the right time. Guest stars: Íngrid Martz as Sophie, Édgar Vivar
2	2	"La entrevista"	5 September 2019
A show reporter arrives at the mansion to interview Carlos and Deyanira. Diego suspects that it is a fixed marriage and will do his best to expose them.
3	3	"Los chinitos"	12 September 2019
Carlos must convince a Korean businessmen to close a big business deal. Deyanira tries to help him and prepares something special that could ruin the deal.
4	4	"La luna de miel"	19 September 2019
Diego gives Carlos and Deyanira a trip to the beach to go on a honeymoon, but Deyanira is so afraid of getting on a plane that she will do everything possible to avoid the trip, even divorce.
5	5	"El ex"	26 September 2019
El Güicho, a former boyfriend of Deyanira, shows up at the mansion to recover her love. Diego has an opportunity to discover that his cousin's marriage is arranged.
6	6	"Terapia de pareja"	3 October 2019
Pilar suspects that Carlos and Deyanira are going through a marriage crisis and enrolls them in couples therapy. Jeny and Britny help Max study.
7	7	"Fiesta sorpresa"	10 October 2019
It's Carlos's birthday and Deyanira prepares a party for him, but Carlos gets the biggest surprise when he arrives at the mansion with some businessmen and they discover the event.
8	8	"Reforma educativa"	17 October 2019
Deyanira has to choose a school for her siblings and will enroll them in a famous and prestigious school. A social worker comes to meet the family, putting at risk the registration and Deyanira's marriage.
9	9	"Las cenizas"	24 October 2019
It is Carlos' grandmother's death anniversary and as every year, a small family ceremony takes place, which is complicated when Deyanira throws the away the urn with the ashes.
10	10	"Los cosméticos"	31 October 2019
Deyanira, bored of being a millionaire, decides to start a business selling cosmetics with her friends. Diego convinces her to sell her products during a very important meeting for Carlos.
11	11	"Anillo falso"	7 November 2019
Deyanira discovers that Carlos gave him a fake wedding ring and decides to leave him. Endangering the marriage and inheritance, is the perfect opportunity for Diego to be the new heir.
12	12	"La charla"	14 November 2019
Dayana arrives with a school report for misconduct. Deyanira believes that she is in bad steps and decides to have "The Talk" with her. Carlos must work, but Max distracts him with his video games.
13	13	"¿Qué pasó anoche?"	21 November 2019
Carlos and Deyanira decide to go out with friends without each other. When they return and are heavily drunk, they sleep together for the first time. The arrival of Carlos' ex-girlfriend complicates everything.

=== Season 2 (2020) ===
No. overall	No. in season	Title	Original release date
14	1	"Lo de anoche"	5 October 2020
Carlos and Deyanira wake up together in the same bed, with no memory of the night before. While trying to remember, they discover a clown, the loss of grandfather and the return of Carlos's ex-girlfriend.
15	2	"Fake news"	12 October 2020
Deyanira is a victim of social media when a video of when she was a waitress goes viral on the internet. The memes confuse Max and make him believe that Deyanira is actually his mother.
16	3	"Ay, nanita"	19 October 2020
Deyanira believes that the inheritance is cursed and wants to renounce it. Diego takes the opportunity to scare her and Carlos through a séance with a medium.
17	4	"Cartas de amor"	26 October 2020
Deyanira decides to ditch the love letters and gifts from Charly's ex-girlfriends at a garage sale. Max receives a school report and asks Javier to pretend to be his dad.
18	5	"Recuerdos"	2 November 2020
Pamela has decided to set up her office in the mansion and work from there. Carlos tries to prevent it but she locks him in the office where they will remember old times.
19	6	"Charly chambitas"	9 November 2020
Carlos feels displaced when Deyanira hires a manly plumber to repair a leaking shower, so he decides to take over the repairs at the mansion.
20	7	"La Langosta"	16 November 2020
Pamela and Diego bring live lobsters to eat. Charly and Deyanira misinterpret Pamela's conversations and think that she wants to kill Deyanira.
21	8	"Primera cita"	23 November 2020
Dayana manages to have her first date with a boy from school and it will be at the mansion. Matías quits working with Diego and Javier takes the opportunity to hire him.
22	9	"Diseño de interiores"	30 November 2020
Deyanira looks for a doily that her grandmother wove for her when she was 15 years old and finds out that Carlos threw it away. To make up for his mistake, Charly will let Deyanira decorate the mansion.
23	10	"¿Embarazada yo?"	7 December 2020
Deyanira has nausea and cravings, and begins to do the math to find out if she is pregnant. Max asks Carlos for help to participate with him in a virtual Father's Day Rally.
24	11	"Ronquidos"	14 December 2020
Deyanira has serious snoring problems. Carlos, tired of not being able to sleep, asks for a divorce. Britny and Diego have a strange approach.
25	12	"Charly Jr."	21 December 2020
A baby arrives with everything and instructions for care at the mansion. Nana Pilar wants to go live in Veracruz.

=== Season 3 (2021) ===
No. overall	No. in season	Title	Original release date
26	1	"¿Cómo ser padres?"	15 April 2021
Charly and Deyanira see adoption as their best way to collect the inheritance and since their new child does not have to be a baby, they will try various characters from the mansion.
27	2	"Inseminación"	22 April 2021
Javier suggests Charly and Deyanira resort to insemination to have a child. Diego discovers Deyanira's dark past and has a rapprochement with Britny.
28	3	"Los XV de Dayana"	29 April 2021
Deyanira organizes a quinceañera party for Dayana with Latin Lover as the choreographer of the waltz. Diego tries to become Deyanira's best friend so that she confesses that her marriage is false.
29	4	"Padre pobre, padre rico"	6 May 2021
Deyanira's father shows up at the mansion, under the excuse that he wants to make up for lost time. Max and Dayana hide a dog in the mansion.
30	5	"Charlie vegano"	13 May 2021
Charlie lies and says that he became a vegan so as not to eat Doña Tifo's tacos, without knowing that he will regret it. Diego teaches Max to dance.
31	6	"Aniversario sorpresa"	20 May 2021
Deyanira thinks she will receive a huge gift from Charlie for her wedding anniversary. Nana Pilar will start browsing social media with the help of Max and Dayana.
32	7	"El día después del beso"	27 May 2021
Charly and Deyanira want to know if they felt something after the kiss they gave each other and for that they have to repeat it. Britny goes on a date with Max's trainer and Diego explodes with jealousy.
33	8	"Diseño de imagen"	3 June 2021
Deyanira feels that she already looks groomed and tries to rejuvenate with a makeover. Max wants to get a tattoo without telling Deyanira.
34	9	"¿Dónde está el bebé?"	10 June 2021
Deyanira and Charly get a real baby to train as parents and collect the inheritance. Britny and Escarlet start a craft beer business.
35	10	"Nadie sabe lo que tiene"	17 June 2021
Charly loses the family fortune in the stock market and Deyanira gets him a job, while Dayana looks for how Grandpa Gregorio got rich.
36	11	"¡Tubo, tubo!"	24 June 2021
Diego discovers some photographs of Deyanira's past with which Charlie could lose his inheritance. Dayana and Max try to save a rat that broke into the house.
37	12	"Tú eres yo"	1 July 2021
Deyanira imagines how the story with Charly would have been if she were the millionaire and he the poor. The notary visits the family to give them news about the inheritance.
