= Dry Martina =

- Theatrical release poster
- Directed by: Che Sandoval
- Written by: Che Sandoval
- Starring: Antonella Costa; Patricio Contreras; Dindi Jane
- Distributed by: Netflix
- Release date: April 17, 2018 (Buenos Aires Film Festival)
- Running time: 95 minutes
- Countries: Chile; Argentina
- Language: Spanish

Dry Martina is a 2018 Argentine-Chilean comedy-drama film written and directed by Che Sandoval. It tells the story of a former child star having lost their fame and longs for the kind of romantic encounters she once indulged in.

== Plot ==
Martina Andrade is a popular Argentine singer. She is very sexually liberated but suddenly becomes frigid after a breakup. One evening, Francisca, a young woman from Chile, visits her and claims to be her half-sister. She also tells her that her lost cat has been found by her boyfriend Cesar. Martina rejects her, but falls in love with Cesar. They sleep together but he has to go back to Chile. Martina then takes a plane to join him.

== Cast ==
- Antonella Costa as Martina
- Patricio Contreras as Nacho
- Dindi Jane as Francisca (as Geraldine Neary)
- Pedro Campos as César
- Héctor Morales as young man
- Alvaro Espinoza as Juan
- Lucas Espinoza as young man at rest stop
- Joaquin Fernández as Daniel
- Martín Garabal as Roberto (as Martin Garcia Garabal)
- Rafael Gumucio as Tomás
- Josefa Claude as hot girl at soda shop
- Fernando Guzzoni as hot boy at soda shop
- Humberto Miranda as janitor
- Joaquin Mussio as doctor
- Sergio Nicloux as Leonardo
