= Te doy la vida =

- Genre: Telenovela
- Created by: María José Galleguillos
- Written by: María José Galleguillos
- Directed by: Claudio López de Lerida
- Creative director: María Eugenia Rencoret
- Starring: Cristián Riquelme; Celine Reymond; Carmen Gloria Bresky; Álvaro Espinoza; Carmen Disa Gutierrez
- Country of origin: Chile
- Original language: Spanish
- No. of seasons: 1
- No. of episodes: 158

Production
- Producer: Cecilia Aguirre
- Camera setup: Multi-camera
- Production company: Mega

Original release
- Network: Mega
- Release: May 4 – November 23, 2016

Te doy la vida (English: I Give You My Life) is a 2016 Chilean telenovela created by María José Galleguillos, that premiered on Mega on May 4, 2016 and ended on November 23, 2016. It stars Celine Reymond and Cristián Riquelme.

== Plot ==
The plot revolves around Fabián Garrido (Cristián Riquelme), a mechanic who works downtown. One day Fabián meets Isidora Valdés (Celine Reymond), a young woman who needs to save her son. It turns out that Fabián is the father of Isidora's son, and he can donate his spinal cord to save the boy. Although Isidora is married to Emilio San Martín (Álvaro Espinoza), a successful lawyer, Fabián slowly begins to fall in love with her and soon she starts to respond to Fabián's feelings.

== Cast ==
- Celine Reymond as Isidora Graciela Valdés Bianchi
- Cristián Riquelme as Fabián Garrido Maldonado
- Álvaro Espinoza as Emilio San Martín / Luis "Luchin" Martínez
- Carmen Disa Gutierrez as Ester Maldonado
- Gabriel Prieto as Domingo Garrido Mateluna
- Carmen Gloria Bresky as Monica Betania Urriola Fonseca
- Ramón Llao as Nelson Rodríguez
- Cecilia Cucurella as Valeria Bianchi
- Osvaldo Silva as Horacio Valdés
- Constanza Araya as Yoana Rodríguez Norambuena
- Ricardo Vergara as Ayrton Mondaca
- Etienne Bobenrieth as Samuel Garrido Maldonado
- María José Illanes as Daniela Valdes Bianchi
- María de los Ángeles Garcías as Rosa María Chavez
- Carmen Zabala as Gabriela Valdes Bianchi
- León Izquierdo as Nicolás Ignacio San Martín Valdes / Nicolás Garrido Ahumada

== Ratings ==
Season	Episodes	First aired		Last aired		Average
Season	Episodes	Date	Rating	Date	Rating	Average
1	158	May 4, 2016	18	November 23, 2016	23.6	16.8
