= Eva Cedeño =

Mexican actress

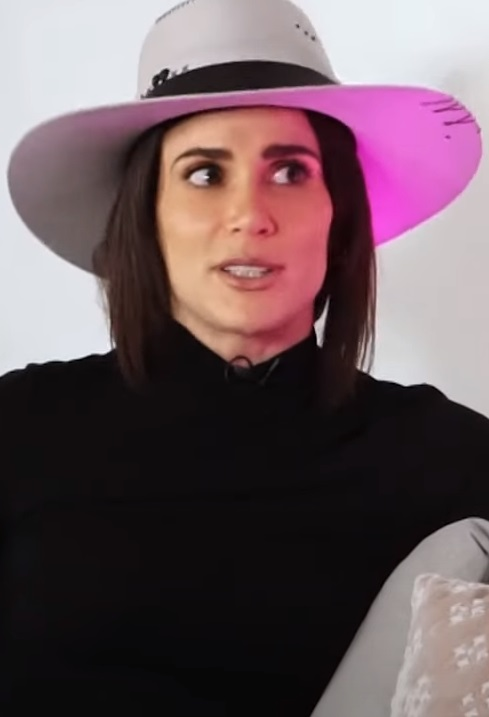
- Cedeño in 2022
- Born: Irma Evangelina Cedeño Rascón; December 28, 1989 (age 36); Hermosillo, Sonora
- Occupation: Actress
- Years active: 2011–present

Irma Evangelina Cedeño Rascón (born December 28, 1989), known professionally as Eva Cedeño, is a Mexican actress. She is known for playing the role of Elena Villaseñor in the telenovela Te doy la vida.

== Biography ==
Cedeño began her career in 2011 as a TV host for Teledición Hermosillo. In 2013, Cedeño competed in the Nuestra Belleza Jalisco pageant. In 2014, she began to study acting at the Centro de Educación Artística of Televisa. Cedeño made her acting debut in the 2015 telenovela A que no me dejas, where she played the role of Odette. In 2020, she landed her first telenovela lead role in Te doy la vida, portraying Elena Villaseñor.

== Filmography ==
=== Film roles ===
| Year | Title | Role | Notes |
|---|---|---|---|
| 2016 | El Capo: El escape del siglo | Katia García | |
| 2017 | Extrema obsesión | | |

=== Television roles ===
| Year | Title | Role | Notes |
|---|---|---|---|
| 2015 | A que no me dejas | Odette Córdova | Recurring role |
| 2016 | Simplemente María | Bertha de Mérida | Recurring role |
| 2017 | Mi adorable maldición | Inés Bustos | Recurring role |
| 2017 | El vuelo de la victoria | Cristina Rivadeneira Montero | Recurring role |
| 2018 | Por amar sin ley | Leticia Jara | Main cast (season 1) |
| 2019 | Un poquito tuyo | Leticia "Lety" Solano | Main cast |
| 2020 | Te doy la vida | Elena Villaseñor | Main role |
| 2020 | Mi querida herencia | Pamela | Main cast (season 2) |
| 2021 | ¿Qué le pasa a mi familia? | Regina Rueda | Main role |
| 2022 | Amor dividido | Abril Moreno | Main role |
| 2022 | Cabo | Isabela | Main cast |
| 2023 | Golpe de suerte | Miranda Ortíz | Main role |
| 2025 | A.mar, donde el amor teje sus redes | Estrella Contreras | Main role |
| 2026 | Sabor a ti | Ángela Herrera | Main role |
