= List of telenovelas broadcast by Univision tlnovelas =

This is a list of telenovelas currently broadcast, scheduled to be broadcast or formerly broadcast on Univision tlnovelas, a Spanish-language American cable television network.

== Telenovelas currently broadcast ==
Title	Start date
Rebelde	June 17, 2026
La madrastra	July 23, 2026
La Gata	August 10, 2026
Por siempre mi amor	September 2, 2026
Qué pobres tan ricos	September 16, 2026
Mi pecado	October 19, 2026

== Former programming ==
=== Telenovelas produced from 2020 to 2024 ===
Title	Run	Ref
Vivir de amor	September 29, 2025 – March 27, 2026	
Te doy la vida	January 5 – April 28, 2026	

=== Telenovelas produced from 2010 to 2019 ===
Title	Run	Ref
Hijas de la luna	September 16, 2024 – January 7, 2025	
Sin tu mirada	June 19 – November 21, 2024	
El vuelo de la victoria	September 26, 2024 – January 29, 2025	
La doble vida de Estela Carrillo	April 29 – August 12, 2026	
Despertar contigo	April 29 – October 16, 2026	
Tres veces Ana	February 2 – July 22, 2026	
Antes muerta que Lichita	March 25 – September 25, 2024	
Amor de barrio	December 2, 2024 – April 29, 2025	
La vecina	April 30, 2025 – January 1, 2026	
Amores con trampa	May 1 – October 24, 2023	
Que te perdone Dios	August 12, 2025 – January 29, 2026	
Yo no creo en los hombres	August 26, 2024 – February 11, 2025	
Mi corazón es tuyo	October 13, 2025 – June 16, 2026	
La malquerida	June 24 – December 3, 2024	
El color de la pasión	March 30 – September 15, 2026	
La Tempestad	August 16, 2021 – February 1, 2022	
Corazón indomable	June 12, 2023 – January 23, 2024	
La mujer del Vendaval	March 14 – November 4, 2016	
Porque el amor manda	January 30 - October 10, 2025	
Corona de lagrimas	July 20, 2022 – January 6, 2023	
Cachito de cielo	January 9 – June 9, 2023	
Amor bravío	February 12 – September 25, 2025	
Un refugio para el amor	February 21 – October 7, 2022	
Abismo de pasión	November 25, 2024 – July 8, 2025	
Amorcito corazón	August 22, 2022 – June 6, 2023	
La que no podía amar	September 29, 2021 – May 13, 2022	
Ni contigo ni sin ti	November 26, 2018 – May 24, 2019	
Una familia con suerte	March 20, 2023 – March 23, 2024	
Triunfo del amor	October 25, 2023 – June 20, 2024	
Teresa	January 24 – August 22, 2024	
Cuando me enamoro	April 13 – December 22, 2020	
Llena de amor	September 11, 2023 – June 18, 2024	
Soy tu dueña	May 5 – August 1, 2014 (abridged); March 15 – September 28, 2021	

=== Telenovelas produced from 2000 to 2009 ===
Title	Run	Ref
Camaleones	August 22, 2016 – February 24, 2017	
Hasta que el dinero nos separe	September 30, 2013 – August 15, 2014	
Sortilegio	June 28 – October 29, 2021	
Verano de amor	April 15 – September 27, 2019	
Mañana es para siempre	April 30 – December 7, 2012; October 29, 2018 – June 7, 2019	
En nombre del amor	April 1 – November 22, 2013; August 14, 2017 – April 6, 2018	
Un gancho al corazón	November 26, 2012 – September 27, 2013; April 23, 2018 – February 22, 2019; November 23, 2020 – September 24, 2021	
Juro Que Te Amo	July 6, 2015 – January 15, 2016; December 2, 2019 – June 12, 2020	
Cuidado con el ángel	June 15, 2020 – March 11, 2021	
Querida enemiga	February 26 – July 27, 2018; April 4 – September 2, 2022	
Alma de hierro	February 28 – December 9, 2022	
Las tontas no van al cielo	May 14 – November 23, 2012; October 10, 2016 – April 21, 2017; February 10 – August 21, 2020	
Palabra de mujer	March 1 – June 22, 2012; July 22, 2019 – February 7, 2020	
Pasión	January 18 – May 27, 2016	
Muchachitas como tú	April 9 – October 26, 2018	
Bajo las riendas del amor	January 2 – July 28, 2017	
Lola, érase una vez	February 18, 2019 – January 3, 2020; January 8 – November 18, 2025	
Yo amo a Juan Querendón	March 1 – May 11, 2012; October 12, 2015 – October 7, 2016	
Destilando Amor	August 3, 2020 – March 26, 2021	
Amar sin límites	July 11 – December 30, 2016; August 24, 2020 – February 12, 2021	
Las dos caras de Ana	February 4 – July 19, 2019	
Mundo de fieras	May 30 – November 11, 2016; February 2 – July 19, 2022	
Código Postal	May 27, 2019 – February 21, 2020; December 12, 2022 – September 8, 2023	
Duelo de Pasiones	January 18 – July 8, 2016	
Heridas de amor	June 10 – December 6, 2019; May 16 – November 11, 2022	
La verdad oculta	November 7, 2016 – April 21, 2017; June 17 – November 29, 2019	
La fea más bella	August 18, 2014 – October 9, 2015	
Peregrina	August 19, 2013 – January 3, 2014; February 27 – July 14, 2017; July 15 – November 29, 2024	
Alborada	December 9, 2019 – April 10, 2020	
Barrera de amor	September 29, 2014 – April 3, 2015; July 30, 2018 – February 1, 2019	
Contra viento y marea	August 28, 2017 – February 23, 2018; March 29 – September 24, 2021	
La Madrastra	November 18, 2013 – May 2, 2014; June 11 – November 23, 2018	
Inocente de ti	January 5 – July 3, 2015	
Apuesta por un amor	March 31 – September 26, 2014; July 31, 2017 – January 26, 2018	
Amar otra vez	September 27, 2021 – February 25, 2022	
Rubí	January 5 – June 12, 2015; February 24 – July 31, 2020	
Mujer de madera	July 9, 2025 – April 21, 2026	
Corazones al límite	February 26 – September 14, 2018	
Amarte es mi Pecado	April 22 – September 1, 2026	
Mariana de la Noche	September 7, 2015 – March 11, 2016; September 5, 2022 – March 10, 2023	
Bajo la misma piel	January 29 – June 8, 2018; April 11 – August 19, 2022	
Velo de novia	September 27, 2021 – April 1, 2022	
Amor real	July 8 – November 15, 2013; June 26 – November 3, 2017	
Niña amada mía	March 1 – April 27, 2012; April 6 – September 4, 2015; January 23 – June 23, 2017; September 17, 2018 – February 15, 2019	
Así son ellas	December 10, 2018 – April 12, 2019; November 14, 2022 – March 17, 2023	
Clase 406	April 20, 2015 – August 19, 2016; March 13, 2023 – July 11, 2024	
Entre el Amor y el Odio	June 25 – December 14, 2012	
Cómplices Al Rescate	October 25, 2023 – April 25, 2024	
Navidad sin fin	December 23, 2013 – January 10, 2014; December 23, 2020 – January 15, 2021	
El juego de la vida	September 1, 2014 – April 17, 2015; September 30, 2019 – May 15, 2020	
Salomé	December 10, 2012 – July 5, 2013; September 25, 2017 – April 20, 2018; January 18 – August 13, 2021	
El Manantial	February 15 – June 25, 2021	
La intrusa	April 27 – October 30, 2020	
Amigas y rivales	March 26 – December 7, 2018	
El derecho de nacer	July 17 – November 3, 2017; November 1, 2021 – February 18, 2022	
El noveno mandamiento	December 10, 2012 – March 29, 2013; April 24 – August 11, 2017	
Abrázame muy fuerte	November 14, 2016 – May 19, 2017; May 18 – November 20, 2020	
Mi Destino Eres Tú	April 24 – August 25, 2017	
Carita de ángel	August 9, 2021 – April 8, 2022	
Locura de amor	November 19, 2025 – April 28, 2026	
Siempre te amaré	June 30, 2014 – January 2, 2015	

=== Telenovelas produced from 1990 to 1999 ===
Title	Run	Ref
Mujeres Engañadas	January 13 – June 27, 2014	
Laberintos de pasión	June 9 – September 26, 2014	
Alma Rebelde	January 6 – May 9, 2014	
Infierno en el paraíso	November 25, 2013 – March 28, 2014	
Tres mujeres	November 19, 2012 – December 20, 2013	
El diario de Daniela	June 7 – October 24, 2023	
Soñadoras	December 17, 2012 – August 16, 2013	
El Privilegio de Amar	May 7 – December 7, 2012; June 15, 2015 – January 15, 2016	
Vivo Por Elena	June 11 – November 16, 2012	
La usurpadora	August 4, 2014 – January 2, 2015	
Mi pequeña traviesa	April 29 – September 13, 2024	
Huracán	March 1 – June 8, 2012	
Esmeralda	March 1 – May 4, 2012	
Cañaveral de Pasiones	May 20 – September 27, 2013	
María la del Barrio	September 12, 2016 – January 20, 2017	
Bajo un mismo rostro	January 26 – June 12, 2015	
Volver a empezar	February 22 – September 9, 2016; October 10, 2022 – April 28, 2023	
María Mercedes	March 12 – July 6, 2012	
Valeria y Maximiliano	May 22 – September 22, 2017	
La pícara soñadora	February 17 – June 6, 2014; January 6 – April 24, 2020	
Muchachitas	November 2, 2020 – August 6, 2021	
Cadenas de amargura	November 2, 2015 – February 19, 2016; February 25 – June 14, 2019	
Alcanzar una estrella	May 12 – August 29, 2014; November 6, 2017 – February 23, 2018	
Cuando llega el amor	September 30, 2013 – February 14, 2014; November 6, 2017 – March 23, 2018	

=== Telenovelas produced from 1980 to 1989 ===
Title	Run	Ref
Carrusel	December 4, 2024 – August 11, 2025	
Quinceañera	January 7 – May 17, 2013	
Rosa Salvaje	March 1 – March 9, 2012; June 15 – October 30, 2015	
Cuna de Lobos	September 29, 2014 – January 23, 2015	
Colorina	July 9, 2012 – January 4, 2013	
