= Zacatillo, un lugar en tu corazón =

Mexican telenovela

- Genre: Telenovela; Comedy
- Created by: Pedro Pablo Quintanilla
- Written by: Carmen Sepúlveda; Edwin Valencia; Luis Reynoso; Lucero Suárez; Julián Aguilar
- Directed by: Gastón Tuset; Claudia Elisa Aguilar
- Starring: Ingrid Martz; Jorge Aravena; Laura Zapata
- Theme music composer: Tavo Lara; Jorge Domingez
- Opening theme: Hasta mi último día performed by La Original Banda Limon; Zacatillo performed by La Original Banda Limon
- Country of origin: Mexico
- Original language: Spanish
- No. of episodes: 130

Production
- Executive producer: Lucero Suárez
- Producer: Ángel Villaverde
- Production locations: Filming; Televisa San Ángel; Mexico City, Mexico; Locations; Atlixco, Puebla, Mexico; Cuernavaca, Morelos, Mexico; Las Estacas, Morelos, Mexico; Mexico City, Mexico
- Cinematography: Víctor Soto; Gilberto Macín
- Camera setup: Multi-camera
- Running time: 41-44 minutes
- Production company: Televisa

Original release
- Network: Canal de las Estrellas
- Release: February 1 – July 30, 2010

Zacatillo, un lugar en tu corazón (English title: Zacatillo, A New Beginning) is a Mexican telenovela produced by Lucero Suárez for Televisa. It aired on Canal de las Estrellas from February 1, 2010, to July 30, 2010.

Ingrid Martz and Jorge Aravena starred as protagonists, while Laura Zapata and Carmen Becerra starred as antagonists. Patricia Navidad, Arath de la Torre, Mariana Karr, Alejandro Ibarra and Arleth Terán starred as stellar performances.

In the United States, Univision aired Zacatillo from May 10, 2011, to October 17, 2011.

== Synopsis ==
Karla (Ingrid Martz) is an actress and singer, who decides to rest from show business after her concert at Zacatillo. Her agent ordered to have her killed. Everyone believes she is dead, but she takes refuge in Zacatillo, where she once found love and may find love again but with a different man. Her manager arranged for her to be dragged and thrown into the sea.

== Cast ==
- Ingrid Martz as Karla Abreu Campos de Zárate/Sara Villegas
- Jorge Aravena as Gabriel Zárate de Moreno
- Laura Zapata as Doña Miriam Solórzano de Gálvez
- Patricia Navidad as Zorayda Dumont de Zarate "La Primera Dama"
- Héctor Ortega as Don Abundio Zarate
- Carmen Becerra as Adriana "La Noviecita" Pérez-Cotapo Echevarría
- Alejandro Ibarra as Alejandro Sandoval
- Maria Alicia Delgado as Alicia "Lichita" López y López
- Beatriz Moreno as Josefa "Pepita La Solterona"
- Mike Biaggio as Fernando Gálvez
- Arath de la Torre as Carretino Carretas/Gino Capuccino
- Benjamin Rivero as Gustavo Velez
- Arleth Terán as Hortensia "Tencha" Guzmán de Carretas
- Isaura Espinoza as Belarmina
- Polo Monarrez as Cruz Cruz Cruz
- Daniela Torres as Nora
- Gaby Mellado as Guadalupe "Lupita" Treviño
- Raquel Morell as Carmen
- Mariana Karr as Doña Rosa Echvarría de Pérez-Cotapo
- Christina Pastor as Sara Villegas Campos
- Bibelot Mansur as Gudelia
- Liz Vega as Olga
- Emilia Carranza as Martha Moreno de Zárate
- Sharis Cid as Paulina Torres
- Yago Muñoz as Elisandro "Eli" de Jesus Zarate Dumont
- Sheyla as Cleodomira Rivadeneira "La Chata"
- Agustin Arana as Santiago
- Raquel Pankowsky as Sonia
- Rubén Cerda as Padre Nemesto
- José Carlos Femat as Alan Landeta
- Alejandro Nones as Julio
- Juan Peláez as Augusto Cienfuegos
- Mario Sauret as Don Tomás
- Eric Prats as Psychiatrist
- Xavo Kno as Paco
- Jorge Ortin as Porfirio/Zeferino
- Polo Ortin as Zeferino
- Alicia Fhar as Roxana
- Lorelí as Vanessa
- Begona Narvaez as Marissa
- Priscila Avellaneda as Marcela
- Susy-Lu Peña as Natalia
- Daniela Zavala as Paloma
- Polly as Chabela
- Jorge Gallegos as Marlon
- Jesús Briones as Braulio
- Thelma Dorantes as Pancracia
- René Mussi as Camilo
- Angeles Balvanera as Cora
- Patricia Reyes Spindola as Fredesvinda Carretas
- Gabriela Mellado as Liliana "Lily" Treviño
- Haydee Navarra as Patricia Soria
- Gloria Sierra as Ximena
- Manuel "Flaco" Ibáñez as Profundo Isimo
- Beatriz Shantal as Rebeca
- María Prado as La Bruja
- Lalo Zayas as Mauro
- Norma Iturbe as Nurse
- Paola Flores as Paula

== Awards ==
=== TVyNovelas Awards ===
Year	Category	Nominee	Result
2011	Best Co-lead Actress	Patricia Navidad	Nominated
2011	Best Co-lead Actor	Arath de la Torre	Nominated
2011	Best Leading Actress	Laura Zapata	Nominated
2011	Best Young Lead Actress	Gaby Mellado	Nominated
2011	Best Male Revelation	José Carlos Femat	Nominated

=== Califa de Oro Awards ===
Year	Category	Nominee	Result
2010	Best Performance of the Year	Mike Biaggio	Won
2010	Best Performance of the Year	Beatriz Moreno	Won
2010	Best Performance of the Year	Carmen Becerra	Won
2010	Best Performance of the Year	Mariana Karr	Won
2010	Best Performance of the Year	Héctor Ortega	Won
2010	Best Performance of the Year	Bibelot Mansur	Won
2010	Best Performance of the Year	María Alicia Delgado	Won
2010	Best Performance of the Year	Patricia Navidad	Won
2010	Best Performance of the Year	Arleth Terán	Won
2010	Best Telenovela of the Year	Lucero Suárez	Won

=== TV Adicto Golden Awards ===
Year	Category	Nominee	Result
2010	Best Supporting Actor	Arath de la Torre	Won
2010	Best Supporting Actress	Patricia Navidad	Won
