= Mariana Karr =

Argentine-Mexican actress

- Born: María Elena Coppola González; 29 November 1949; Buenos Aires, Argentina
- Died: 31 July 2016 (aged 66); Mexico City, Mexico
- Occupation: Actress
- Years active: 1969–2016
- Partner: Raúl Taibo
- Children: Solange Alchourron
- Awards: TVyNovelas Award for Best Supporting Actress (2006)

María Elena Coppola González (29 November 1949 – 31 July 2016), better known as Mariana Karr, was an Argentine-Mexican actress who worked mostly in films and telenovelas.

== Filmography ==
1. Corazón contento, 1969
2. La Noche del hurto, 1976
3. Escalofrío, 1978
4. Qué linda que es mi familia, 1980
5. Sucedió en el internado, 1985

== Telenovelas ==
1. El amor tiene cara de mujer, 1977
2. Rebelde y solitario, 1982
3. Tramposa, 1984
4. Venganza de mujer, 1986
5. La dueña, 1995
6. Lazos de amor, 1995
7. Bendita mentira, 1996
8. El secreto de Alejandra, 1997
9. Soñadoras, 1998
10. Mi destino eres tú, 2000
11. María Belén, 2001
12. El juego de la vida, 2001
13. Así son ellas, 2002
14. Bajo la misma piel, 2003
15. Clap, el lugar de tus sueños, 2003
16. La Madrastra, 2005
17. Alborada, 2005
18. Pasión, 2007
19. Querida Enemiga, 2008
20. Juro Que Te Amo, 2008
21. Zacatillo, un lugar en tu corazón, 2011
22. Amorcito corazón, 2011
23. La mujer del vendaval, 2013
24. Corazón indomable, 2013
25. Qué pobres tan ricos, 2014
26. La vecina, 2015

== Theatre ==
1. El curioso incidente del perro a la medianoche, 2014
