= Enamorándome de Ramón =

Mexican telenovela

- Genre: Telenovela
- Written by: Lucero Suárez; Edwin Valencia; Carmen Sepúlveda; Luis Reynoso
- Story by: Doris Seguí
- Directed by: Adrián Frutos
- Starring: José Ron; Esmeralda Pimentel
- Theme music composer: Jorge Domínguez
- Opening theme: "Algo divino" by Lupita D'Alessio
- Country of origin: Mexico
- Original language: Spanish
- No. of seasons: 1
- No. of episodes: 116

Production
- Executive producer: Lucero Suárez
- Producers: Ángel Villaverde; Bosco Primo de Rivera
- Production locations: Filming; Televisa San Ángel; Mexico City, Mexico; Locations; Mexico City, Mexico; Tijuana, Mexico
- Editors: Mauricio Cortés; Rodrigo Lepe
- Camera setup: Multi-camera

Original release
- Network: Las Estrellas
- Release: February 20 – July 30, 2017

Related
- Vino el amor; En tierras salvajes; Tomasa Tequiero

Enamorándome de Ramón is a Mexican telenovela produced by Lucero Suárez for Televisa. It is based on the Venezuelan telenovela written by Doris Seguí, Tomasa Tequiero produced in 2009. Filming began on December 1, 2016, at Televisa San Ángel.

The series stars José Ron as Ramón López and Esmeralda Pimentel as Fabiola Medina.

== Plot ==
Fabiola and Andrea are orphaned when their parents die in a plane crash, and both they and Hortensia, their grandmother, are surprised when they learn that the beneficiary of their inheritance of a million dollars is none other than Juana, the humble woman who works as their Nana.

The entire Medina family is outraged by the news and pressure Juana to give them the insurance money. She gets tired of everyone's selfishness and makes it clear that she will not allow anyone to administer the money, because she will do so thinking about the well-being of Andrea and Fabiola. Hortensia demands for Juana to leave, without imagining that her granddaughters will defend Juana, but after a misunderstanding she leaves.

Juana is not interested in money; her main concern is her son Ramón, a young nobleman who lived in the province working as a mechanic, but had to move to the capital after falling in love with Sofia, the daughter of a capo de la Mafia, who is forced to break his heart and demand that he leaves to protect him from her father.

Ramón arrives at the house of Luisa and Dalia, giving a great surprise to Juana, who makes him aware of the death of her bosses and the insurance. Ramón advises his mother to give the Medina family the insurance money to avoid problems with them.

Dalia takes Ramón to Antonio's car workshop to get him work and to his surprise, he meets Fabiola who does not lose her opportunity to make him feel bad, telling him that she is the owner and does not intend to hire him.

Despite their differences, there is a very special chemistry between them, and they can not hide the attraction and, at the same time, the rejection they have, which brings problems to Fabiola, and her relationship with Francisco, who gets upset with jealousy.

Fabiola had agreed to work in the machine shop just out of ambition. However, Ramón unmasks her to Juana, making her accept that she decided to work in the shop, just so they can trust her with the insurance money. Fabiola, knowing she was discovered, decides to continue working to show them that she can be responsible.

The daily coexistence is creating an increasingly strong attraction between Fabiola and Ramón, until the point of not being able to hide their feelings, but things get complicated when Sofia appears looking for Ramon. This time, she is not ready to give him up and she is determined to get Ramón back.

Meanwhile, Hortensia goes to several lawyers, to challenge the document that declares Juana as sole beneficiary of the Medina family's life insurance, as well as inventing that the insurance signature is false, blaming Juana as a counterfeiter. She does not mind losing the insurance just so she can see Juana in jail. It is revealed that Juana truly is the beneficiary of the insurance after Andrea and Jorge find a video tape where Fabiola and Andrea's parents decide to leave the money to Juana.

Thus, while Juana struggles with the constant attacks of Hortensia, Ramón is in the midst of two women who are in love with him and will fight with everything to stay with his love.

== Cast ==
=== Main ===
- José Ron as Ramón López
- Esmeralda Pimentel as Fabiola Medina

==== Recurring ====
- Nuria Bages as Hortensia
- Marcelo Córdoba as Julio Medina
- Luz Elena González as Roxana
- Arturo Carmona as Antonio Fernández
- Lisset as Virginia de Medina
- Carlos Bracho as Pedro
- Alejandro Ibarra as Porfirio
- Marisol del Olmo as Juana López
- Fabiola Guajardo as Sofia Vásquez
- Pierre Angelo as Benito
- Bárbara Torres as Luisa
- Claudia Martín as Andrea Medina
- Pierre Louis as Jorge Medina
- María Alicia Delgado as Fredesvinda
- Rebeca Mankita as Emilia
- Sachi Tamashiro as Margarita Medina
- Gonzalo Peña as Francisco Santillán
- Alfredo Gatica as Raúl "Rulo"
- Ana Jimena Villanueva as Dalia
- Diego Escalona as Diego Fernández
- Sugey Ábrego as Adalgisa
- Alejandro Valencia as Valente Esparza
- Ivan Amozurrutia as Osvaldo Medina
- Steph Bumelcrownd as Sara Soler
- Marlene Kalb as Susana
- Jorge Ortín as Lucho
- Alejandro Peniche as Agustín
- Fernanda Vizzuet as Verónica
- Alejandro Muela as Alfonso "Poncho"
- Solkin Ruz as Salvador "Chava"
- Jose Luis Badalt as Darío
- Rodrigo Vidal as Finito

=== Special participation ===
- Eduardo Shacklett as Ricardo Medina
- Lupita Jones as Katy Fernández de Medina
- Benny Ibarra as Rosendo "El Bocanegra" Vásquez

== Rating ==
=== Mexico rating ===
Timeslot (CT)	Episodes	First aired		Last aired	
Timeslot (CT)	Episodes	Date	Viewers (millions)	Date	Viewers (millions)
Mon–Fri 7:30pm	116	20 February 2017	18.7	30 July 2017	27.6

=== U.S. rating ===
Timeslot (ET)	Episodes	First aired		Last aired	
Timeslot (ET)	Episodes	Date	Viewers (millions)	Date	Viewers (millions)
Mon–Fri 8pm/7c Mon–Fri 7pm/6c	105	August 8, 2017	1.54	January 15, 2018	2.26

== Awards and nominations ==
Year	Award	Category	Nominated	Result
2018	TVyNovelas Awards	Best Telenovela of the Year	Lucero Suárez	Nominated
2018	TVyNovelas Awards	Best Actor	José Ron	Nominated
2018	TVyNovelas Awards	Best Antagonist Actress	Luz Elena González	Nominated
2018	TVyNovelas Awards	Best Antagonist Actor	Alfredo Gatica	Nominated
2018	TVyNovelas Awards	Best Co-lead Actress	Marisol del Olmo	Nominated
2018	TVyNovelas Awards	Best Young Lead Actress	Claudia Martín	Nominated
2018	TVyNovelas Awards	Best Original Story or Adaptation	Lucero Suárez, Carmen Sepúlveda, Edwin Valencia, and Luis Reynoso	Nominated
