= Silvia Mariscal =

Mexican actress (born 1946)

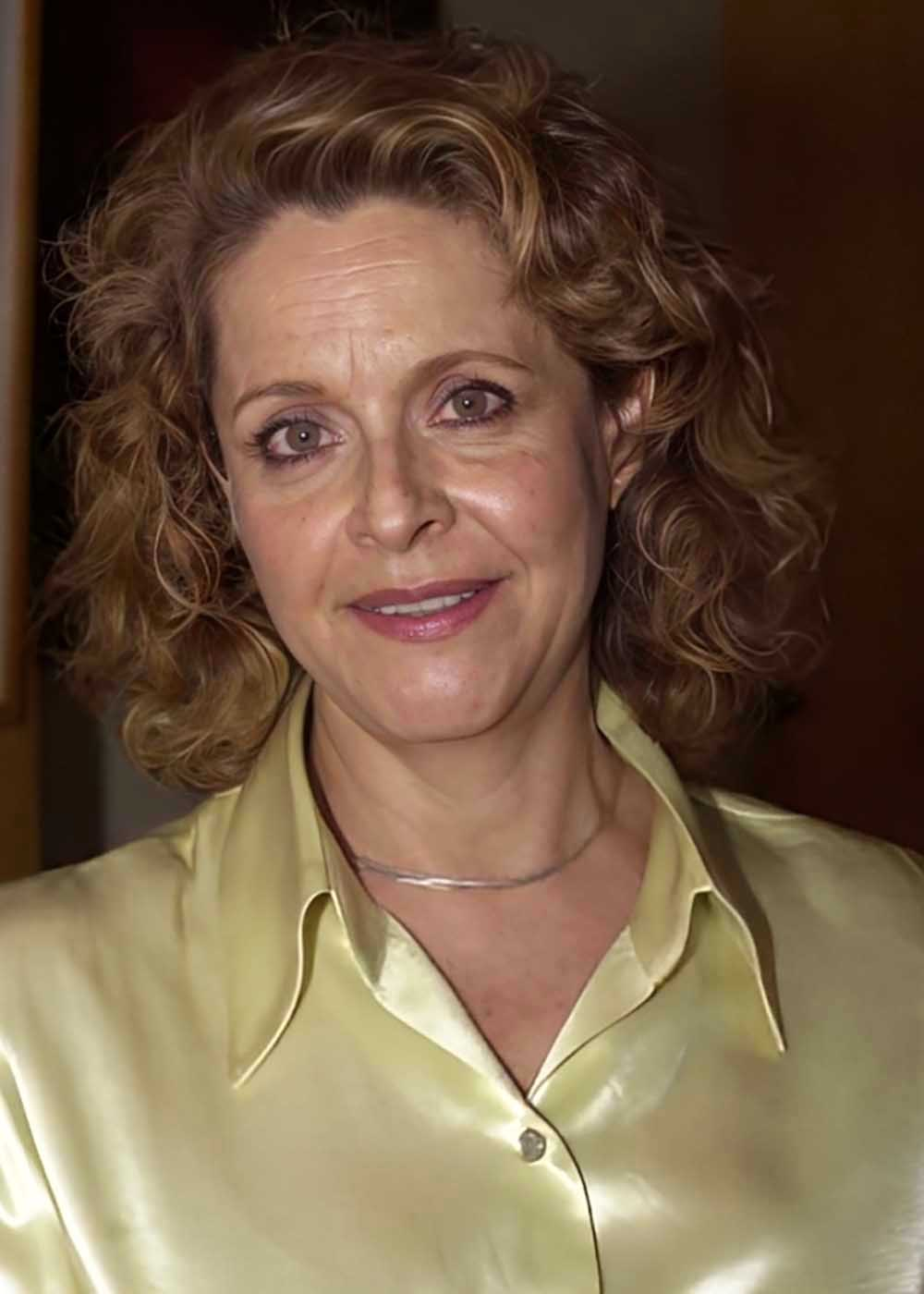
- Born: Silvia Ramírez Aguilar; September 13, 1946 (age 79); Mexico City, Mexico
- Occupation: Actress
- Years active: 1971-present

Silvia Mariscal (born Silvia Ramírez Aguilar on September 13, 1946) is a Mexican actress. She appeared in the 2008 Mexican film Nora's Will.

== Filmography ==
Television roles
Year	Title	Roles	Notes
1971	Lucía Sombra	Teresa	
1974	El chofer	María	
1975	El milagro de vivir	Tere	
1977	Acompáñame	Adriana	
1978	Rosalía	Carmen	
1979	Lágrimas de amor	Cecilia	
1984	Aprendiendo a vivir	Martha	
1988	El rincón de los prodigios	Soledad	
1989	Morir para vivir	Elena	
1990	Cenizas y diamantes	Andrea	
1991	Vida robada	Daniela	
1992	Destinos	Gloria	4 episodes
1993	Capricho	Mercedes	
1995	Alondra	Mercedes	
1997	Alguna vez tendremos alas	Silvia de Nájera	
1998	La mentira	Leticia	
2000	Mi Destino Eres Tú	María Suárez de Galindo	
2001	Navidad sin fin	Doña Isabel	
2001–2002	El juego de la vida	Sara Domínguez	
2002	Así son ellas	Unknown role	
2003	Velo de novia	Leticia Robleto	
2007	La fea más bella	Mamá de Luigui	
2007	Muchachitas como tú	Martha	
2008	Las tontas no van al cielo	Isabel Carmona de López	
2009	La rosa de Guadalupe	Rosario	Episode: "Por amor"
2009–2010	Mujeres asesinas	Perla	Episode: "Clara, fantasiosa"
2009–2010	Mujeres asesinas	Rosa	Episode: "María, fanática "
2010–2011	Teresa	Refugio Aguirre de Chávez	
2011–2012	Amorcito Corazón	Sara de Cordero	
2013–2014	De que te quiero, te quiero	Luz	
2014	La malquerida	Elena Benavente	
2015	Como dice el dicho	Mercedes	Episode: "Cuando Dios cierra todas las puertas"
2016	El hotel de los secretos	Elisa	

== Awards and nominations ==
=== TVyNovelas Awards ===
Year	Category	Telenovela	Result
2008	Best First Actress	Muchachitas como tú	Nominated

=== Kids Choice Awards México ===
Year	Category	Telenovela	Result
2011	Favorite Quote	Teresa	Won
