= Carmen Becerra =

Mexican actress

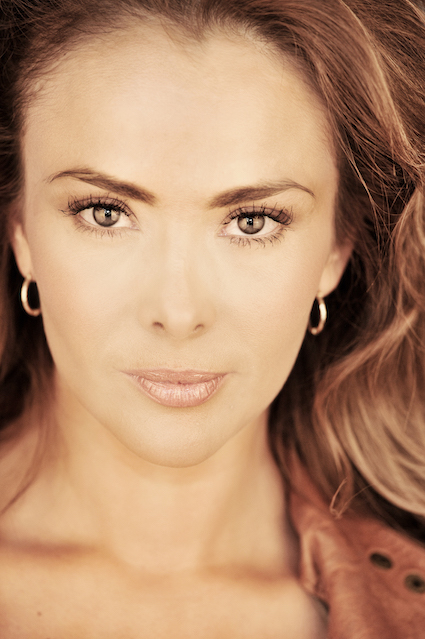
- Becerra in 2012
- Born: Carmen Alicia Becerra García; December 7, 1977 (age 48); Toluca, Mexico
- Occupation: Actress
- Years active: 1998-present
- Spouse: Pablo Grosso

Carmen Becerra (born Carmen Alicia Becerra García December 7, 1977 in Toluca, State of Mexico, Mexico) is a Mexican actress. She is known for her antagonistic roles in Mexican telenovelas such as Querida Enemiga (2008), Zacatillo (2010), and Simplemente María (2015).

== Personal life ==
Becerra wanted to be a chef, but she became an actress. She married very young, but is divorced from her husband and now remarried.

== Filmography ==
Telenovelas, Series
Year	Title	Role	Notes
1999	Serafín	Coco	Supporting role
2000	Mi destino eres tú	Vanessa	Supporting role
2001–2002	Salomé	Diana	Supporting role
2004	Amar otra vez	Sandra Murguía Navarro	Supporting role
2003	Tu historia de amor		
2004–2005	Apuesta por un amor	Nadia Thomas	Supporting role
2001–2006	Mujer, casos de la vida real		
2006–2007	Amar sin límites	Lidia Morán Huerta	Supporting role
2008	Querida Enemiga	Sara de la Cruz	Main role
2008–2009	Un gancho al corazón	Flora	Guest role
2010	Zacatillo, un lugar en tu corazón	Adriana Pérez-Cotapo Echevarría	Main role
2011–2012	Amorcito Corazón	Sabrina Peñaralta	Supporting role
2013–2018	Como dice el dicho	Dinorah / Leonila	3 episodes
2013–2014	De que te quiero, te quiero	Mireya Zamudio "La Jaiba"	Supporting role
2015–2016	Simplemente María	Karina Pineda	Supporting role
2018	Por amar sin ley	Ligia Cervantes	Guest role (season 1)
2019	Silvia Pinal, frente a ti	Sara Dorantes	Guest role
2019	Monarca	Renata Martínez	8 episodes
2023	Tierra de esperanza	Irasema Huerta	Supporting role
2026	Cuando fui bonita	Lulú Cherry	

== Awards and nominations ==
Year	Award	Category	Telenovela	Result
2005	TVyNovelas Awards	Best Female Revelation	Apuesta por un amor	Won
2009	Premios ACE (Argentina)	Best Villain	Querida Enemiga	Won
