= René Casados =

Mexican actor

- Born: René Casados Morales; Veracruz, Veracruz, Mexico
- Spouse: Rosa Adriana Ojeda
- Children: 2

René Casados Morales is a Mexican actor best known for his roles in telenovelas.

== Biography ==
Casados began working as an actor in the 1970s, appearing in films, television, and theatre, as well as working as a co-host of the program XE-TU with Erika Buenfil. As of February 2010, he has appeared in nineteen telenovelas (Spanish-language soap operas), most notably La madrastra as Bruno Mendizábal and Fuego en le sangre as Father Tadeo.

Casados married Rosa Adriana Ojeda, whom he met at the age of thirteen; the couple has two daughters, Kukene and Triana.

== Filmography ==
=== Television ===
- El renacer de Luna (2026) - Leo
- El ángel de Aurora (2024) - Juventino Macías "El Pintas"
- Corazón guerrero (2022) - Heriberto Villalba
- Mi fortuna es amarte (2022) - Heliodoro Flores
- ¿Qué le pasa a mi familia? (2021) - Wenceslao Rueda Cortés
- Juntos el corazón nunca se equivoca (2019) - Audifaz Córcega
- Mi marido tiene familia (2017-2019) - Audifaz Córcega
- Las Amazonas (2016) - Eduardo Mendoza Castro
- Mi Corazón Es Tuyo (2014) - Bruno Romero
- La tempestad (2013) - Claudio Salvatore Petrone
- Abismo de pasion (2012) - Father Guadalupe "Lupe" Mondragón
- Cuando me enamoro (2010) - Gonzalo Monterrubio
- Glam Girls (2009)
- Mujeres asesinas (2009)
- Corazón salvaje (2009) — Noel Vidal
- Fuego en la sangre (2008) — Father Tadeo
- Mundo de fieras (2006) — Nicolás Navarro
- La madrastra (2005) — Bruno Mendizábal
- Corazones al límite (2004) — Dante Lacalfari
- Amarte es mi pecado (2004) — Juan Carlos Orellana
- Clase 406 (2002) Telenovela — Manolo Cayetano Catasús
- María Belén (2001) Telenovela — Jorge
- Abrázame muy fuerte (2000) Telenovela — Francisco José Bravo/Fernando Joaquín
- Ramona (2000) — Angus O'Faill
- Tres mujeres (1999) .... Leonardo Marcos
- Ángela (1998) — Alfonso Molina
- Preciosa (1998) — El Gran Sabú
- La jaula de oro (1997) — Flavio Canet
- La antorcha encendida (1996) — Agustín de Itúrbide
- Dos vidas (1988) — Dino
- XE-TU (1982-1987)
- Extraños caminos del amor (1981) — Miguel
- Muchacha de barrio (1979) — Ernesto
- La hora del silencio (1978)

=== Film ===
- Mejor es que Gabriela no se muera (2007) — Abigail
- Se me sale cuando me río (1983)
- El testamento (1980)
- El tonto que hacia milagros (1980)
- El sexo me da risa (1978)
- Pedro Páramo (1978)
- El fantasma del lago(1977)
- La guera Rodríguez (1977)
- La hora del jaguar (1977)
- La leyenda de Rodrígo (1977)
- El rediezcubrimiento de México (1977)
- La viuda negra (1977)

=== Theatre ===
- Gran musical (2003)
- Aborto canta a la vida (1988)
