= Alejandro Ibarra =

Mexican actor and singer (born 1973)

- Born: José Alejandro Ibarra De Llano; April 28, 1973 (age 53); Mexico City, D.F., Mexico
- Occupations: Actor, singer
- Years active: 1989-present
- Spouse: Marilu Milla (2009-present)
- Partner: África Zavala (2006-2009)
- Children: Diego (b. 2010); Sofia (b. 2014)
- Parent(s): Benny Ibarra; Julissa
- Relatives: Benny Ibarra (brother)

Alejandro Ibarra (born José Alejandro Ibarra De Llano on April 28, 1973, in Mexico City, D.F., Mexico) is a Mexican actor and singer.

== Filmography ==
Year	Title	Role	Notes
1987-88	Tal como somos		
1990	Alcanzar una estrella	Felipe Rueda	Supporting Role
1991	Alcanzar una estrella II	René	Supporting Role
1993-94	Buscando el paraíso	Ángel	Supporting Role
1994-95	Agujetas de color de rosa	Aldo	Supporting Role
1996	Marisol	Francisco "Paco" Suárez	Supporting Role
1997-98	Huracán	Santiago Villarreal	Supporting Role
1998	Gotita de amor	Jesús García	Protagonist
2000	Locura de amor	Gerardo	
2001	El noveno mandamiento	Bruno Betancourt	Supporting Role
2002-03	¡Vivan los niños!	Octavio	Supporting Role
2004	Amarte es mi pecado	Alfredo de La Mora/Alfredo Rangel Gómez	Antagonist
2005	Sueños y caramelos	Oswaldo	Supporting Role
2005-06	Peregrina	Rubén "Tontín"	Supporting Role
2007	Amor sin maquillaje	Valentín	Protagonist
2008	Las tontas no van al cielo	Eduardo All	Supporting Role
2009-10	Atrévete a soñar	Amadeo Cuevas "Amadeus"	Supporting Role
2010	Zacatillo, un lugar en tu corazón	Alejandro Sandoval	Supporting Role
2011-12	Amorcito Corazón	Lic. Felipe Ferrer	Co-protagonist
2013	La tempestad	Bagre	Supporting Role
2013-14	De Que Te Quiero, Te Quiero	Paul Champignon	Supporting Role
2015-16	La vecina	Padre Vicente Granados	Supporting Role
2017	Enamorándome de Ramón	Porfirio	Supporting role
2018	Por amar sin ley	Dario	Guest Role
2026	Sabor a ti	Juan Solano	

== Awards and nominations ==
=== Premios TVyNovelas ===
Year	Category	Telenovela	Result
1991	Best Male Revelation	Alcanzar una estrella	Nominated
2012	Best Co-star Actor	Amorcito Corazón	Nominated
