= Margarita Isabel =

Mexican actress (1943–2017)

- Born: Margarita Isabel Morales y González; 25 July 1943; Mexico City, Mexico
- Died: 9 April 2017 (aged 73); Cuernavaca, Morelos
- Occupation: Actress
- Years active: 1970-2010

Margarita Isabel (born Margarita Isabel Morales y González; 25 July 1943 – 9 April 2017) was a Mexican Ariel Award-winning film and television actress.

She died on 9 April 2017, aged 73, from emphysema.

== Filmography ==
Telenovelas, Series, Films, Theater
Year	Title	Role	Notes
1970	El juego de Zuzanka	Selam (voice)	Film
1973	Los meses y los días	Cecilia's mother	Film
1975	La otra virginidad		Film
1978	Oye Salomé!		Film
1978	Naufragio	neighbor	Film
1979	Amor Libre	Woman at Disco	Film
1979	María de mi corazón		Film
1980-81	Caminemos	Dra. Monroy	Supporting Role
1983	Las apariencias engañan		Film
1986	Chido Guan, el tacos de oro	Carolina	Film
1986-87	Cuna de lobos	Elena de Cifuentes	Supporting Role
1987	Lo que importa es vivir	widow	Film
1987-88	El pecado de Oyuki	Mary	Supporting Role
1988-90	La Hora Marcada	mother	Episode: "Regalo de navidad"
1989	Teresa	Marcela	Supporting Role
1990	Alcanzar una estrella	Rita del Castillo	Supporting Role
1991	Danzón	Silvia	Film
1991	Like Water for Chocolate	Paquita Lobo	Film
1991	Contigo en la distancia	Lina	Film
1992	Baila conmigo	Catalina	Supporting Role
1992	Carrusel de las Américas		
1992	Triángulo		Special Appearance
1992	Los años de Greta	Nora's friend	Film
1992	Más que alcanzar una estrella	Rosita's mother	Film
1992	Tres son peor que una		Film
Golpe de suerte		Film	
1993	Abuelita de Bakman		Film
1993	Cronos	Mercedes	Film
1993	La ultima batalla	Director of School	Film
1993-94	Valentina	Martha Villalón	Supporting Role
1994	Perfume, efecto inmediato		Film
1994-95	Volver a Empezar	Aurora	Supporting Role
1995	Me tengo que casar/Papá soltero		Film
1995	Dos crímenes	Amalia	Film
1995	Mujeres insumisas	Rosa	Film
1995-97	Mujer, casos de la vida real		3 Episodes
1996	Confidente de secundaria	Soledad	Supporting Role
1996-97	Luz Clarita	Verónica	Supporting Role
1997	Alguna vez tendremos alas	Verónica del Olmo	Supporting Role
1997	Reencuentros	Lidia	Film
1999	Marea brava	Lupe	Supporting Role
2000-01	Golpe bajo	Eugenia Bernal	Co-Protagonist
2003	Lucía, Lucía	Lucía's mother	Film
2003	Dame tu cuerpo	Dafne	Film
2004	Amarte es mi Pecado	Alejandra Madrigal de Horta	Antagonist
2004	La mujer de todos		Theatrical Performance
2005	La Madrastra	Carmela San Román	Supporting Role
2006-07	Mundo de Fieras	Otilia Álvarez de Velásquez	Antagonist
2007-08	Palabra de Mujer	Consuelo vda. de Ibarra	Supporting Role
2009	Mujeres Asesinas 2	Carmen	Episode: "Tita Garza, estafadora"

== Awards and nominations ==
Year	Award	Category	Nominee	Result
1984	Ariel Award	Best Supporting Actress	Las Apariencias engañan	Nominated
1987	Ariel Award	Best Actress in a Minor Role	Chido Guan, El Tacos de Oro	Nominated
1992	Ariel Award	Best Actress in a Minor Role	Como agua para chocolate	Won
1995	Ariel Award	Best Supporting Actress	Dos Crímenes	Won
1996	Ariel Award	Best Actress in a Minor Role	Mujeres Insumisas	Won
1998	TVyNovelas Awards	Best Co-star Actress	Alguna vez tendremos alas	Nominated
2006	TVyNovelas Awards	Best Co-star Actress	La Madrastra	Nominated
