= Lucero Suárez =

Mexican producer and screenwriter (born 1963)

- Born: Lucero Suárez; December 3, 1963 (age 62); Mérida, Yucatán, Mexico
- Occupations: Producer and screenwriter
- Years active: 1985-present

Lucero Suárez (born December 3, 1963) is a Mexican producer and screenwriter.

== Biography ==
Lucero Suárez was born on December 3, 1963, in Mérida, Yucatán. She began her career as a production manager in various soap operas with the producer Carlos Téllez including the soap opera Cuna de lobos. As executive producer, she began in 1996 with the telenovela "Para toda la vida", based on the Chilean soap opera La madrastra. In 1998, she made the soap opera Rencor apasionado based on a radionovela of Hilda Morales Allois.

In 2001, she produced El noveno mandamiento also based on a radionovela of René Allouis. In 2001, she produced Amar otra vez written by Pablo Serra and Erika Johanson. In 2005, she produced the children's soap opera Pablo and Andrea, the last children soap opera in Televisa, with an original story of Lorena Salazar, Areli Caraza and Alejandro Cicchitti.

In 2006–2007, she returned to produce a soap opera of Pablo Serra and Erika Johanson, this time including the co-producer of the Miami Fonovideo Las Dos Caras de Ana. In 2008, she produced again with Pablo Serra and Erika Johanson the soap opera Querida Enemiga. In 2010, she produced the soap opera Zacatillo, un lugar en tu corazón; after 10 years of waiting for it to be released, it finally succeeded and it was a tribute to the original writer of the story, Pedro Pablo Quintanilla González.

In 2011–2012, she produced the soap opera Amorcito corazón. In 2013, she produced the soap opera De que te quiero, te quiero, and in 2015, Suárez produced the soap opera La Vecina.

In 2017, she produced the soap opera "Enamorándome de Ramón". In 2019, she produced the soap opera "Ringo la pelea de su vida" and in 2020, produced "Te doy la vida". All these soap operas have been a success for being in the first places in audience both in Mexico and in the United States.

== Filmography ==
Executive Producer, Associate Producer, Scene Director, Production Manager, Screenwriter
Year	Title	Notes
1985	Juana Iris	Production Manager
1986	Muchachita	Production Manager
1986-87	Cuna de lobos	Production Manager
1988-89	El extraño retorno de Diana Salazar	Production Manager
1990-91	En carne propia	Production Manager
1992-93	Tenías que ser tú	Associate Producer
1996	Para toda la vida	Executive Producer
1998	Rencor apasionado	Scene Director
1998	Rencor apasionado	Screenwriter
1998	Rencor apasionado	Executive Producer
2001	El noveno mandamiento	Executive Producer
2004	Amar otra vez	Executive Producer
2005	Pablo y Andrea	Executive Producer
2006–2007	Las dos caras de Ana	Executive Producer
2008	Querida enemiga	Screenwriter
2008	Querida enemiga	Executive Producer
2010	Zacatillo, un lugar en tu corazón	Screenwriter
2010	Zacatillo, un lugar en tu corazón	Executive Producer
2011–2012	Amorcito corazón	Screenwriter
2011–2012	Amorcito corazón	Executive Producer
2013–2014	De que te quiero, te quiero	Screenwriter
2013–2014	De que te quiero, te quiero	Executive Producer
2015–2016	La vecina	Screenwriter
2015–2016	La vecina	Executive Producer
2017	Enamorándome de Ramón	Screenwriter
2017	Enamorándome de Ramón	Executive Producer
2019	Ringo	Screenwriter
2019	Ringo	Executive Producer
2020	Te doy la vida	Screenwriter
2020	Te doy la vida	Executive Producer
2021-2022	S.O.S me estoy enamorando	Screenwriter
2021-2022	S.O.S me estoy enamorando	Executive Producer
2023	Perdona nuestros pecados	Screenwriter
2023	Perdona nuestros pecados	Executive Producer
2024	Fugitivas, en busca de la libertad	Screenwriter
2024	Fugitivas, en busca de la libertad	Executive Producer
2025	Monteverde	Screenwriter
2025	Monteverde	Executive Producer
2026	Sabor a ti	Screenwriter
2026	Sabor a ti	Executive Producer

== Awards and nominations ==
=== Premios TVyNovelas ===
Year	Category	Telenovela	Result
2007	Best Telenovela of the Year	Las Dos Caras de Ana	Nominated
2009	Best Telenovela of the Year	Querida Enemiga	Nominated
2014	Best Telenovela of the Year	De que te quiero, te quiero	Nominated
2016	Best Starting of the Year	La vecina	Nominated
2016	Best Telenovela of the Year	La vecina	Nominated
2016	Best Original Story or Adaptation	La vecina	Nominated
2018	Best Telenovela of the Year	Enamorándome de Ramón	Nominated
2018	Best Original Story or Adaptation	Enamorándome de Ramón	Nominated
2020	Best Telenovela of the Year	Ringo	Nominated
2020	Best Original Story or Adaptation	Ringo	Nominated
2020	Best Starting of the Year	Ringo	Nominated

=== Premios Califa de Oro 2010 ===
Category	Project	Result
Best Telenovela of the Year	Zacatillo, un lugar en tu corazón	Win.

=== Presea Luminaria de Oro 2019 ===
- For your job in the production of: Ringo para Lucero Suárez

=== Premio Nacional Universitario 2020 ===
- For your job in the TV Mexican
