= Gaby Mellado =

Mexican television actress (born 1992)

- Born: Gabriela Mellado; June 14, 1992 (age 33); Orizaba, Mexico
- Occupation: Actress
- Years active: 2008-present

Gaby Mellado (born June 14, 1992, in Orizaba, Mexico) is a Mexican television actress.

== Filmography ==
Year	Title	Role	Notes
2008	En nombre del amor	Sandra "Sandy"	"Reproches" (Season 1, Episode 1)
2010	Zacatillo, un lugar en tu corazón	Liliana "Lily" Treviño	Supporting role
2010	Ensueño	Lu	Short film
2010–11	Triunfo del amor	Gaby	Recurring role
2011	Amorcito corazón	Bárbara	Recurring role
2013	Corazón indomable	Solita	Main cast
2013–14	Qué pobres tan ricos	Macarena Larrea Condesa de Valladolid	Recurring role
2015	Lo imperdonable	Ana Perla Sánchez Álvarez	Main cast
2017	El vuelo de la victoria	Adriana Sánchez	Recurring role
2021	La desalmada	Clara	Recurring role
2022	Esta historia me suena	Susana Figueroa / Susan Kelly	Episode: "Me gusta"
2024	Ahora que no estás	Lucía	Episode: "Escucha tu corazón"
2025	A.mar, donde el amor teje sus redes	Brisa Contreras Lara	Main cast
2025	Rosario Tijeras	Ximena	Recurring role (season 4)
2025	Doménica Montero	Blanca Aranda Mayo	Main cast

== Awards and nominations ==
Year	Award	Category	Work	Result
2011	TVyNovelas Awards	Best Young Lead Actress	Amorcito corazón	Nominated
