= Jorge Aravena =

Peruvian actor

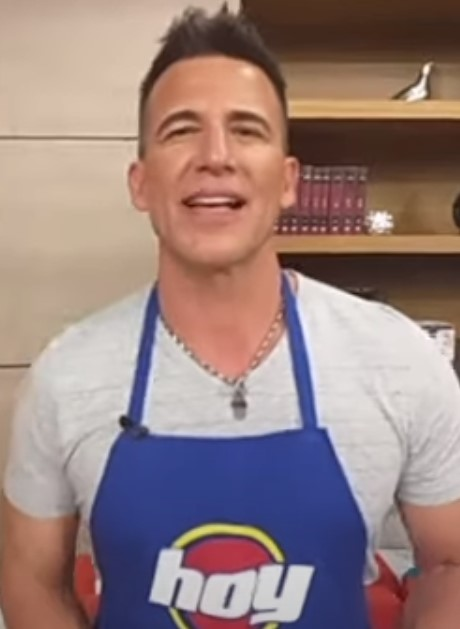
- Jorge Aravena in 2019
- Born: Jorge Agustín Aravena Masías; October 1, 1969 (age 56); Lima, Peru
- Occupation: Actor

Jorge Aravena (Spanish pronunciation: [ˈxoɾxe aɾaˈβena]; born October 1, 1969) is a Peruvian-Venezuelan telenovela actor. He is known for his role in telenovelas such as Girasoles Para Lucia, La Revancha, Secreto de Amor, and Mi Vida Eres Tu.

== Biography ==
Jorge was born in Lima to Chilean father Jorge Luis Aravena and Peruvian mother Varo Masías. At the age of 10, his parents moved to Venezuela where he grew up and started his career.

In 1995, he married Jenny Martínez. He had three children from his marriage: Jorge Luis, Claudia Valentina and Luis Fernando. However, he separated from Jenny in 2005 and filed for divorce in 2007.

== Filmography ==
Year	Title	Role
1992	La loba herida	Cabrerito
1992	Divina obsesión	Tito
1993	Sirena	Orbick
1995	Dulce enemiga	N/A
1996	Pecado de Amor	Fernando
1997	Todo Por Tu Amor	Cristóbal Pérez
1998	Samantha	Rodolfo Villalobos
1999	Mujer Secreta	Sebastián Palacios
1999	Girasoles para Lucía	Roberto Landaeta Santa María
2000	La Revancha	Reinaldo Arciniegas
2001	Secreto de Amor	Carlos Raúl Fonseca
2003	Engañada	Gabriel Reyes Bustamente
2005	El amor las vuelve locas	Arnaldo
2005	Al filo de la ley	Andres (13 episodes, 2005) "At the Edge of the Law"
2006	Mi Vida Eres Tú	Gabriel
2006	Las Dos Caras de Ana	Santiago
2006	Decisiones	-
2007	Sin Vergüenza	Esteban
2008	Querida Enemiga	Ernesto Mendiola
2008	Pobre Millonaria	Luis Arthuro
2009	Nuestra Belleza Latina	Judge (Season 3)
2010	Zacatillo, un lugar en tu corazón	Gabriel Zárate
2011	Como dice el dicho	Víctor
2011	La que no podía amar	David Romo
2012	Una familia con suerte	Sebastian
2012-2013	Porque el Amor Manda	Elias
2014-2015	Mi Corazón es Tuyo	Ángel Altamirano
2016	Un camino hacia el destino	Pedro
2017	El vuelo de la victoria	Jorge
2019	Cita a ciegas	Rufino
2021	MasterChef Celebrity México	Himself
2021	La casa de los famosos	Himself
2024	Pituca sin lucas	Manuel "El Tiburón" Gallardo
2025	Velvet: El nuevo imperio	Gerardo Otegui
