= La vecina =

- Also known as: The Neighbor
- Genre: Telenovela
- Created by: Mónica Agudelo Tenorio
- Written by: Edwin Valencia; Carmen Sepúlveda; Luis Reynoso; Lucero Suárez
- Directed by: Claudia Elisa Aguilar; Juan Pablo Blanco; Víctor Soto; Bernardo Nájera
- Starring: Esmeralda Pimentel; Juan Diego Covarrubias
- Theme music composer: Jorge Octavio Domínguez; Octavio Lara
- Opening theme: "La vecina" performed by Los Ángeles Azules
- Country of origin: Mexico
- Original language: Spanish
- No. of episodes: 176

Production
- Executive producer: Lucero Suárez

Original release
- Network: Canal de las Estrellas
- Release: May 25, 2015 – January 24, 2016

Related
- La costeña y el cachaco (2003)

La vecina (English title: The Neighbor) is a Mexican comedy-telenovela produced by Lucero Suárez for Televisa. It is the remake of the telenovela La costeña y el cachaco produced in 2003 by RCN TV. In the United States, Univision broadcast La vecina from June 22, 2015 to March 3, 2016.

== Production ==
Production of the telenovela began in 2014, but it was not until February that its showing was confirmed.

== Plot ==
Sara ends a long courtship with Cheo and is fired from the hotel where she worked in Progreso. Faced with this situation, she decides to leave to San Gaspar, a small town, for a few days with her uncle Simón an aeronautical engineer who is devoted to agriculture; and with Bruno who falls for Laura the wife of Pedro the local leader of the plunderers of gasoline.

In CONATROL, company dedicated to the distribution of petroleum; the Director-General, Mr. Uribe decides to send the Eng. Antonio Andrade to the plant in San Gaspar, due to excessive theft of gasoline in the area. Antonio agrees to leave immediately, postponed his wedding with Isabel daughter of millionaire Guillermo Cisneros.

In San Gaspar, father Vicente, uncle of Sara, is the leader of "The winged" local football team whose rival is Fidel, the Commander in Chief of San Gaspar, leader of "The Gunners." Both scramble to take over "jaibolera" the maximum trophy of the local tournament.

Ricardo takes advantage of Antonio's absence in the Federal District to take his place, even to seducing Isabel who is engaged to Antonio, and also allying himself in secret with Pedro to pass confidential information about CONATROL.

The action binds Sara and Antonio first as neighbors and then when it comes to CONATROL to ask for work. Sara and Antonio come together during a weekend on an unexpected journey. A great attraction develops between the two despite their very different personalities.

== Cast ==
Cast was confirmed on March 14, 2015.

=== Main cast ===
- Esmeralda Pimentel as Sara Granados
- Juan Diego Covarrubias as Antonio Andrade

=== Supporting cast ===
- Natalia Guerrero as Isabel Cisneros
- Alejandro Ibarra as Padre Vicente Granados
- Luis Gatica as Pedro Arango
- Carlos Bracho as Ing. Juan Carlos Uribe
- Arturo Carmona as Fidel Chávez
- Pierre Angelo as Simón Esparza
- María Alicia Delgado as Marina
- Eduardo Shacklett as Anselmo
- Javier Jattin as Eliseo "Cheo" González
- Violeta Isfel as Cristina "Titina" Aguilera
- Sugey Abrego as Edwina Chávez
- Edsa Ramírez as Natalia
- José Manuel Lechuga as Sebastián
- Adalberto Parra as Eduardo Andrade
- Ariane Pellicer as Ema de Andrade
- José Montini as Pepe
- Ricardo Fernández Rue as Roque
- Alfredo Gatica as Ricardo Segura
- Fernanda Vizuet as Laura de Arango
- Mauricio Abularach as Bruno
- Polo Monárrez as Nelson
- Bibelot Mansur as Magdalena de Chávez
- Maribel Lancioni as Ligia
- Benjamín Rivero as Rafael
- Luis Manuel Ávila as Ing. Gutiérrez
- Itza Sodi as Enrique "Kike"
- Mercedes Vaughan as Mercedes Esparza de Granados
- Rolando Brito as Carmelo Arango
- Lenny Zundel as Ing. Ignacio López
- Roberto Romano as Elías
- Solkin Ruz as Javier
- Kevin Holt as David
- Alex Otero as Vladimir Chávez
- Alexandro as Juancho Granados Esparza
- José Luis Badalt as Ramón
- Gersón Martínez as Quintín
- Mara Matosic as Reportera
- Benny Ibarra as Guillermo Cisneros
- Ricardo Kleinbaum as Marcelo / Guillermo Alfonso
- Mariana Karr as Lucita
- Moisés Muñoz as himself

== Soundtrack ==
La vecina (Original telenovela Soundtrack)

Soundtrack album by La vecina
- Released: July 20, 2015
- Recorded: 2015
- Label: Fonarte Latino
- Producer: Jorge Domínguez

The soundtrack is composed and performed by Jorge Domínguez. It was released on July 20, 2015 by Fonarte Latino

=== Track listing ===
No.	Title	Performer(s)	Length
1.	"Ella es"	Jorge Domínguez	2:45
2.	"Perdóname"	Jorge Domínguez	2:14
3.	"En menos de un segundo"	Jorge Domínguez	3:06
4.	"Tus ojitos"	Jorge Domínguez	2:49
5.	"Enfiestados"	Jorge Domínguez	2:32
6.	"Este amor es para siempre"	Jorge Domínguez	2:59
7.	"Decídete"	Jorge Domínguez	2:37
8.	"Peligro de amor"	Jorge Domínguez	2:05
9.	"Amor eléctrico"	Jorge Domínguez	2:55
10.	"Te traigo serenata"	Jorge Domínguez	2:09
11.	"Esta forma de amarte"	Jorge Domínguez	2:42
12.	"Enamorado de ti"	Jorge Domínguez	3:04
13.	"La Vecina (Variación Orquestada)"	Jorge Domínguez	3:19
14.	"Perdóname (Variación Orquestada)"	Jorge Domínguez	1:21
15.	"Cumbia azul"	Jorge Domínguez	2:30
16.	"Tropicumbia San Gaspar"	Jorge Domínguez	0:56
17.	"Difícil situación"	Jorge Domínguez	2:09
18.	"Acapulco Cumbia"	Jorge Domínguez	1:31

== Mexico broadcast ==
Timeslot (ET/PT)	No. of episodes	Premiered		Ended	
Timeslot (ET/PT)	No. of episodes	Date	Premiere Ratings	Date	Finale Ratings
Monday to Friday 6:10PM	176	May 25, 2015	16.8	January 24, 2016	—N/a
