= Raquel Morell =

Mexican actress (born 1959)

- Born: Raquel del Rosario Ruiz Morell; February 4, 1959 (age 66); Morelia, Michoacán, Mexico
- Occupation: Actress
- Years active: 1982-present
- Notable work: Esmeralda
- Spouse: Fernando Nesme
- Parent: Rosario Morell
- Relatives: Mario Ruiz Morell (brother)

Raquel Morell (Spanish pronunciation: [rakel moɾeʎ] born Raquel del Rosario Ruiz Morell on February 4, 1959) is a Mexican actress who appeared in many telenovelas.

Morell was born in Morelia, Michoacán. She is probably best known for her role of Blanca De Velasco de Peñarreal in telenovela Esmeralda. Blanca was the mother of Esmeralda, who was played by Leticia Calderón. In Mi segunda madre she played a woman called like her in real life – Raquel. She appeared as herself in Contrato con la muerte.

She appeared in De que te quiero, te quiero. Morell, named after her mother Rosario Morell, married cinematographer Fernando Nesme; they are childfree. She is quite interested in astrology. Morell's younger brother is called Mario Ruiz Morell.

== Filmography ==
Telenovelas, Series, Films
Year	Title	Role	Notes
1982	Contrato con la muerte	Raquel	Film
1986	Seducción	Mónica	Supporting role
1987-88	Rosa Salvaje	Paulina	Supporting role
1988	Amor en Silencio	Lizbeth	Supporting role
1989	Mi segunda madre	Raquel	Supporting role
1990-91	Amor de nadie	Gilda Sand	Antagonist
1991	Milagro y magia	Yolanda	Supporting role
1992-93	Mágica juventud	Susana	Supporting role
1995	María José	Natalia de la Cruz de Campuzano	Supporting role
1995-96	Pobre Niña Rica	Carola Medrano	Supporting role
1997	Esmeralda	Doña Blanca de Velasco de Peñarreal	Co-Protagonist
1998	La Usurpadora	Carolina Carrillo	Special appearance
1998	Gotita de amor	Bernarda de Santiago	Antagonist
2000	Locura de amor	Paulina Hurtado	Supporting role
2000-01	Carita de Ángel	Minerva Gamboa de Alvarado	Antagonist
2001-02	El juego de la vida	Consuelo Duarte	Supporting role
2001-03	Mujer, casos de la vida real	Teresa	TV series
2002-03	Clase 406	Yolanda	Supporting role
2003	Amor Real	María Clara de Heredia	Supporting role
2004	Cero y van 4	Teresa	Film
2005	Sexo impostor	Inés	Film
2005	Sueños y caramelos	Rosaura	Supporting role
2005	Pablo y Andrea	Ellen Slater	Supporting role
2006-07	Las Dos Caras de Ana	Rebeca	Supporting role
2008	La rosa de Guadalupe	Julia	TV series
2008-09	Un gancho al corazón	Assistant	Special appearance
2009	Mujeres Asesinas	Olga Mendoza	Episode: "Laura, confundida"
2010	Zacatillo, un lugar en tu corazón	Carmen	Supporting role
2010-11	Cuando Me Enamoro	Ágatha Beltrán	Supporting role
2010-11	Triunfo del amor	Norma	Special appearance
2011-12	Amorcito corazón	Sor Ernestina	Supporting role
2012-13	Amores verdaderos	Tomasina Lagos	Supporting role
2013-14	De que te quiero, te quiero	Rosa Valdez	Supporting role

== Awards and nominations ==
Year	Award	Category	Telenovela	Result
1998	Premios TVyNovelas	Best Co-star Actress	Esmeralda	Nominated
