= Gabriela Goldsmith =

Mexican actress

- Born: Ruth Gabriela Goldschmied Guasch; September 11, 1963 (age 62); Mexico City, Mexico
- Occupations: Actress, former beauty queen, doctor, teacher, organization president
- Years active: 1982–2015

Gabriela Goldsmith (born Ruth Gabriela Goldschmied Guasch on September 11, 1963, in Mexico City, Mexico) is a Mexican actress, former beauty queen, teacher and doctor in innovation and social responsibility and president of two civil society organizations.

== Life ==
Goldsmith was born September 11, 1963, in Mexico City, Mexico. She was born to a Cuban mother of Catalan roots and a Mexican-born father of German-Jewish ancestry.

She began her artistic career by winning a modeling contest in the year of 1982, was able to make her way into the competitive world of entertainment. Within the theatrical stages, Goldsmith, participated in Mujeres frente al espejo, work with which she won the Dramatic Theater Revelation Prize awarded by the Group of Theater Critics and Journalists, in addition to acting in Engáñame si quieres.

While in the field of cinematography the actress has to his credit more than 50 films, among which are La mujer del tahúr (1985), El hijo de Pedro Navaja (1985), Gavilán o paloma (1985), Federal de Narcóticos (1991) and Reclusorio (1997).

In 1996, Gabriela Goldsmith graduated as a dental surgeon from the Autonomous University of Mexico and years later she became a teacher in social responsibility by the Universidad Anáhuac. She is currently a doctor candidate for innovation and social responsibility since she is in the research process.

== Filmography ==
=== Films ===
- (1985) Terror y encajes negros - Neighbor
- (1985) Narco terror
- (1985) La mujer del tahúr
- (1985) Gavilán o paloma*(1986) El hijo de Pedro Navaja - Snadra
- (1986) Yako, cazador de malditos
- (1986) Un macho en la cárcel de mujeres
- (1986) Lavadores de dinero
- (1987) Policía salvaje
- (1988) Su destino era matar
- (1988) Pandilla de cadeneros
- (1988) Los hermanos machorros
- (1988) El virus del poder
- (1988) Ladrón
- (1988) Taquito de ojo
- (1988) Muertes anunciadas - Maru
- (1989) Si mi cama hablará
- (1989) Las calenturas de Juan Camaney II
- (1989) El vampiro teporocho - Roxana
- (1989) Si mi cama hablara
- (1990) Lo inesperado
- (1990) Jack el vigilante
- (1990) Dios se lo pague
- (1990) La mujer del tahúr
- (1990) Las travesuras de Super Chido - Luisa Lana
- (1990) La vengadora implacable - Sofía
- (1990) Los Pelotones y Juan Camaney
- (1990) Inesperada venganza
- (1991) Federal de narcóticos (División Cobra)
- (1992) Más allá del deseo
- (1992) Ramiro Sierra
- (1992) El gato con gatas - Ángela
- (1993) Al filo de la muerte - López
- (1994) Una luz en la escalera - Georgina
- (1995) Sobredosis de violencia
- (1996) Metiche y encajoso III
- (1996) Del robo al paraíso
- (1996) Trebol negro
- (1996) Lluvia de diamantes - Leonor
- (1997) No le bailes de caballito - Silvia
- (1997) Metiche y encajoso IV
- (1997) La camioneta azul de la mafia
- (1997) El poder del narco
- (1997) El ejecutor - Adriana Farres
- (1997) Capos de almoloya
- (1997) Ataque contra las pandillas
- (1997) Reclusorio - Olga
- (1997) Cacería de judiciales
- (1999) Fiesta privada
- (2003) Venganza de un terrorista
- (2004) Animales en peligro
- (2005) Matador

=== Television ===
Year	Title	Role	Notes
1986	El engaño	Rocío Peña	Supporting role
1987	Quinceañera		Special appearance
1987	El precio de la fama	Cecilia	Supporting role
1988	Encadenados	Iris	Supporting role
1988	Papá soltero	Joanna	Series
1989	Trying Times		Series
1989/90	Simplemente María	Lorena Del Villar De Rivera	Main antagonist
1990	Mi pequeña Soledad	Ana Silvia De Arizmendi	Antagonist
1991	Alcanzar una estrella II	Cristina Carrillo	Antagonist
1991	La pícara soñadora	Gladys De Rochild	Supporting role
1992	María Mercedes	María Magnolia González De Mancilla	Supporting role
1994	Prisionera de amor	Isaura Durán	Antagonist
1996	Confidente de secundaria	Sonia	Recurring role
1997	El alma no tiene color	Zafiro Anabelle Fabré Dzul	Antagonist
1997	Hotel Paraíso		Series
1997/98	Sin ti	Prudencia	Supporting role
1998	¿Qué nos pasa?	Giovanna	Series
1998	Camila	Ana María De Iturralde	Co-protagonist
1999	Por tu amor	Sonia Narváez	Supporting role
1999/00	Cuento de navidad	Katia	Mini-TV series
2000	Siempre te amaré	Ariana Vda. De Granados	Supporting role
2001	El derecho de nacer	Adriana Drigani De Rivera	Main antagonist
2001	Güereja de mi vida	Miss Alberta Caña	Series
2002	Así son ellas	Narda Mareca Amaya	Protagonist
2004	Amarte es mi Pecado	Kathy De Quiroga	Recurring role
2004	Big Brother México	Herself	Reality show Contestant
2004	Mujer, casos de la vida real		Series
2004/05	Misión S.O.S	Vivian Johnson De Martínez	Main antagonist
2005	Bajo el mismo techo	Elisa	Series
2006/07	Código Postal	Minerva Carvajal	Co-protagonist
2007	Destilando Amor	Cassandra Santoveña	Special appearance
2007	Amor sin maquillaje	Elena	Main antagonist
2008	Mañana es para siempre		Special appearance
2008/16	La rosa de Guadalupe	Ninfa / Antonia / Isolda / Juliette	Series
2009	Tiempo final	Pamela	Series
2010	Llena de amor	Fedra De Curiel	Special appearance
2011	Dos hogares	Verónica Larrazábal De Garza	Supporting role
2012/13	Amores verdaderos	Doris Orol De Pavia	Recurring role
2012/16	Como dice el dicho	Elena / Ines	Series
2013/14	Quiero Amarte	Emma	Recurring role
2015	Lo imperdonable	Montserrat Vivanco Vda. De De La Corcuera	Supporting role

== Awards and nominations ==
Year	Award	Category	Telenovela	Result
1990	TVyNovelas Awards	Best Antagonist Actress	Simplemente María	Nominated
1993	TVyNovelas Awards	Best Supporting Actress	María Mercedes	Nominated
