= Las dos caras de Ana =

Mexican telenovela

- Genre: Telenovela
- Created by: Pablo Serra; Erika Johanson
- Written by: Virginia Quintana; Edwin Valencia; Carmen Sepúlveda
- Directed by: Claudia Elisa Aguilar; Gastón Tuset
- Starring: Ana Layevska; Rafael Amaya
- Theme music composer: Paulina Carraz; Mario Domm
- Opening theme: "Coleccionista de canciones" performed by Camila
- Country of origin: Mexico
- Original language: Spanish
- No. of episodes: 120

Production
- Executive producer: Lucero Suárez
- Producer: Ángel Villaverde
- Cinematography: Héctor Márquez; Víctor Soto
- Camera setup: Multi-camera
- Production companies: Fono Video Productions; Televisa

Original release
- Network: Canal de las Estrellas
- Release: September 25, 2006 – March 9, 2007

Las Dos Caras de Ana (English: The Two Faces of Ana) is a Mexican telenovela produced by Televisa and Fonovideo. The telenovela aired on Canal de las Estrellas from September 25, 2006 to March 9, 2007. It stars Ana Layevska, Rafael Amaya, Maria Rubio, Mauricio Aspe, Alexa Damian, and Leonardo Daniel. The telenovela was produced, filmed and set in Miami, Florida. The title is a play upon the phrase "las dos caras de Jano" (the two faces of Janus). In the United States, the telenovela aired on Univision from December 18, 2006 to June 4, 2007.

== Plot ==
We meet Ana Escudero in Miami with her entire family in a two-story house until one fateful night when Ana's entire world crashes down on top of her. In the grand debut of the telenovela, the rash Ignacio Bustamante destroyed Ana's life when he runs over her brother while he is trying to change the tire to his car. To cover up the accident, Ignacio purposely throws a sleeping gas bomb into her house while her mom and brother's fiance are inside and then sets the house on fire. Everyone believes it was Ana who died. Her brother, who was in a coma, came out of it, but paralyzed. Afraid for their lives, they move to New York for two years before Fabian dies of an aneurism. Because of this, Ana vows revenge on the Bustamante family and takes on a new persona. Unknowingly, at the same time, Ana meets the brother of Ignacio named Rafael, the son who had been disowned by his father for refusing to go into the family business and wanting to pursue an acting career. Ana falls in love with Gustavo, not realizing that he's part of the family that she wants to seek revenge on, they end up together.

== Cast ==
=== Main ===
- Ana Layevska as Ana Escudero/Marcia Lazcano
- Rafael Amaya as Rafael Bustamante/Gustavo Galvan

=== Also main ===
- Maria Rubio as Graciela Salgado
- Leonardo Daniel as Humberto Bustamante
- Mauricio Aspe as Ignacio Bustamante
- Francisco Rubio as Vicente Bustamante
- Allisson Lozz as Paulina Gardel
- Hector Saez as Dionisio Jimenez
- Raquel Morell as Rebeca
- Maria Fernanda Garcia as Cristina Duran
- Eduardo Rivera as Marcos
- Tono Mauri as Adrian Ponce
- Susana Diazayas as Sofia Ortega
- Melvin Cabrera as Leonardo "Leo" Jimenez
- Alexa Damian as Irene Alcaraz

=== Recurring ===
- Ismael La Rosa as Eric Guerra
- Liliana Rodriguez as Catalina "Katy" Magaña
- Alexandra Graña as Tina Bonilla
- Hannah Zea as Vania Avendaño
- Julián Legaspi as Javier
- Graciela Bernardos as Aurora
- Mariana Huerdo as Claudia
- William Colmenares as Otto
- Juan Vidal as Cristóbal
- Celia Paulina as Kelly
- Ivelin Giro as Natalia
- Rosalinda Rodríguez as Úrsula

=== Special participation ===
- Socorro Bonilla as Julia
- Miguel Ángel Biaggio as Fabián
- Jorge Aravena as Santiago

== Awards and nominations ==
=== TV Y Novelas 2007 ===
Category	Nominee	Result
Best Telenovela	Lucero Suárez	Nominated
Best Lead Actress	Ana Layevska	Nominated
Best Lead Actor	Rafael Amaya	Nominated
Best Male Antagonist	Mauricio Aspe	Nominated
Best Primer Actress	María Rubio	Nominated
Best Co-Star Actor	Francisco Rubio	Nominated
Best Direction	Gastón Tuset and Claudia Elisa Aguilar	Nominated
Best Musical Theme	Coleccionista de canciones by Camila	Nominated

9 nominations, none received.
