= Beatriz Shantal =

Mexican actress, singer, and model (born 1984)

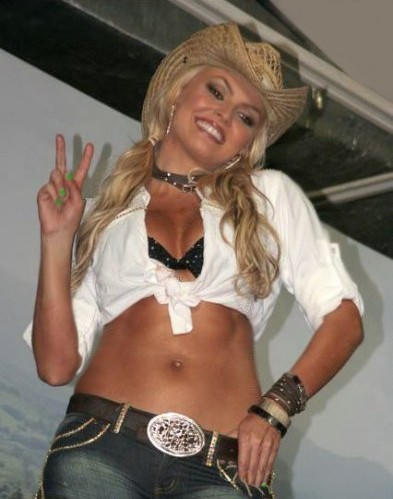
- Born: 27 July 1984 (age 41)
- Other name: Ashley Beatriz Shantal Tellez
- Occupations: Actress, Model and Singer

Beatriz Shantal is a Mexican actress, singer, and model. She began her career as an actress on the telenovela Rubí Beatriz is a New Voice of Goldie Goldie & Bear Beatriz then joined the cast of Rebelde as Paula/Paola. She has also acted in Verano de Amor, Zacatillo, and Eva Luna, and has taken roles in the musicals Rent and 'El Diluvio que viene' .

She has modelled for Calvin Klein, CoverGirl México, and Garnier. She has also released three records: Desde que te vi, Sal en el Café, and No Calles Más, and Beatriz was nominated for the Latin Grammy 2011.

She survived a plane crash on 11 April 2013.
