= Sheyla Tadeo =

Mexican actress, comedian and singer

Sheyla Tadeo (born Sheyla Osiris Tadeo Bringas; April 3, 1973, in Culiacán, Sinaloa) is a Mexican actress, comedian and singer, best known for her appearances on Televisa's various television series.

The daughter of Ramon and Michele (née Bringas) Tadeo, Sheyla attended college at Universidad de Occidente in her hometown of Culiacán. During her senior year in college, Tadeo first came to Mexico City to participate in Siempre en domingo's "Valores Juveniles" contest in 1995. She sang during the contest, and ended up in second place. Just as she was about to go home, Raúl Velasco brought Sheyla to the attention of another Televisa producer, Luis de Llano Macedo, who invited her to appear in an episode of the telenovela Agujetas de color de rosa later that year. Then, in 1996, Tadeo became one of the original "Sketchistosos" on the comedy/variety series Al Ritmo de la noche with Jorge Ortiz de Pinedo. One recurring sketch on the series was set in a classroom; Sheyla's character was named Zoila.

Because of the success of the classroom sketches, Tadeo was invited to reprise her role when those sketches became a separate television series in 1998 as Cero en conducta. On the series, as on the sketches before it, Zoila is an overweight elementary school student who is usually seen bringing a sandwich to class. In 2000 she was cast in the telenovela Mi destino eres tu; this eventually led Tadeo to leave Cero en conducta, although she would reprise her role of Zoila in 2004 for La Escuelita VIP, the successor to Cero en conducta. By then, she had portrayed a maid in another comedy series, La Jaula, and had married Javier Padilla (in 2003). Also, in 2004, she participated in the Televisa reality series Cantando por el sueño and Reyes de la cancion; she ended up winning the competition. She was so good that she was invited to participate in El show de los sueños in 2008; she finished fourth in that competition. She and Padilla were divorced that same year.

In 2009, Tadeo finally recorded her debut album, which features new songs written by Juan Gabriel, who has also written for other singers. She returned to television in 2011 for the telenovela Rafaela. Later that year her second album, Dos estilos una voz was released. The next year, Tadeo underwent weight reduction surgery, losing 52 kilograms (114 2/3 pounds), resulting in a decline of health problems. As a further consequence of the surgery, which took place in her hometown, 8.5 kilograms (18 3/4 pounds) of excess skin removed during the surgery was donated to Culiacan-area children hospitalized in burn units. Her most recent television series was Amorcito Corazon, also in 2012. She most recently released the album Amemonos: un homenaje a Lucha Villa. All three of Sheyla's studio albums to date have been released by EMI Televisa Music in Latin America, including Mexico, and Capitol Records (itself an EMI subsidiary) in the United States.

== Nominations ==
Year	Category	Awards
2011	Breakthrough Of The Year	Premios Oye
2013	Best Ranchero Album	Latin Grammys
