= La Tempestad =

2013 Mexican telenovela

- Genre: Telenovela
- Based on: La Tormenta by Humberto "Kiko" Olivieri
- Written by: Liliana Abud; Mauricio Aridjis; Dolores Ortega
- Directed by: Mónica Miguel; Eric Morales
- Starring: William Levy; Ximena Navarrete; Iván Sánchez; César Évora; María Sorté; Daniela Romo
- Opening theme: "Hoy tengo ganas de ti" performed by Alejandro Fernández and Christina Aguilera
- Country of origin: Mexico
- Original language: Spanish
- No. of episodes: 121

Production
- Executive producer: Salvador Mejía Alejandre
- Producer: Aarón Gutiérrez
- Production location: Televisa San Ángel
- Cinematography: Lino Gama; Jesús Nájera
- Editors: Juan Carlos Frutos; Marco Antonio Rocha
- Camera setup: Multi-camera

Original release
- Network: Canal de las Estrellas
- Release: May 13 – October 27, 2013

La tempestad (International translation: The Tempest, dubbed The Storm by Univision) is a 2013 Mexican telenovela produced by Salvador Mejía Alejandre for Televisa. It is loosely based on the Colombian telenovela La Tormenta, produced by R.T.I. Colombia for Telemundo and Caracol Televisión.

William Levy, Ximena Navarrete, Iván Sánchez, César Évora, María Sorté and Daniela Romo star in this telenovela..

== Cast ==
=== Main ===
- William Levy as Damián Fabré / Michel Fabré
- Ximena Navarrete as Marina Reverte / Magdalena Artigas
- Iván Sánchez as Hernán Saldaña
- César Évora as Fulgencio Salazar
- María Sorté as Beatriz Reverte
- Daniela Romo as Mercedes Artigas

==== Also main ====
- Nora Salinas as Rebeca Reverte
- Manuel Ojeda as Ernesto Contreras
- Alejandro Ibarra as Bagre
- Sharis Cid as Candy
- Sergio Reynoso as Commander Robles
- Alfonso Iturralde as Father Tomás Alcántara
- Latin Lover as El Oso
- Gilberto de Anda as Nereo
- Lucero Lander as Delfina Mata de Salazar
- Eduardo Liñán as Dr. González
- Adalberto Parra as Lieutenant Valdivia
- Luis Manuel Ávila as Olinto
- Amparo Garrido as Alicia
- Fernando Larrañaga as Dr. San Miguel
- Malisha Quintana as Mayuya Canseco
- Janet Ruiz as Rosario Alcántara
- Salvador Ibarra as Lagarto
- Fernando Robles as Lara
- Franky Martin as Lolo
- José Antonio Ferral as Toribio
- Mónica Miguel as Eusebia
- Amor Flores as Jazmín "Lucía" Jiménez
- Enrique Zepeda as Lázaro Salazar Alcántara
- Laura Carmine as Esther "Esthercita" Salazar

=== Recurring ===
- Mauricio Hénao as Valentín
- René Casados as Claudio Petrone
- Mariana Seoane as Úrsula Mata
- Arturo Carmona as José

=== Guest stars ===
- La Sonora Santanera as Herself
- Andrés Gutiérrez as Lawyer Jacobo Souza
- Yessica Salazar as Dr. Antonieta Narváez
- Arturo Peniche as Ariel Reverte

== Mexico broadcast ==
On May 13, 2013, Canal de las Estrellas started broadcasting La tempestad weeknights at 9:30pm, replacing Amores verdaderos. The last episode was broadcast on October 27, with Lo que la vida me robó replacing it the following day. Production of La Tempestad officially started on April 4, 2013.

=== United States broadcast ===
On June 11, 2013, Univision confirmed a July 2013 broadcast of La Tempestad. On July 29, 2013, Univision started broadcasting La tempestad weeknights at 9pm/8c, replacing Amores verdaderos. Just like Qué bonito amor, Univision aired an abridged version of La Tempestad, heavily editing the episodes to end the telenovela quickly. 80 episodes were broadcast during its run. The last episode was broadcast on November 15, 2013, with Lo que la vida me robó replacing it on November 18.

The European premiere was in Slovenia on channel POP TV.

== Soundtrack ==
No.	Title	Artist	Length
1.	"Hoy tengo ganas de ti"	Alejandro Fernández and Christina Aguilera
2.	"Para soñar"	Daniela Romo and Francisco Céspedes
3.	"Pensar en ti"	Daniela Romo and Pandora
4.	"Yo sé"	Jorge Daher
5.	"Mermelada"	Mariana Seoane
6.	"Me equivoqué"	Mariana Seoane
7.	"Quiero ser"	Mariana Seoane
8.	"Vida nueva"	Río Roma
9.	"Ámame"	Marco Di Mauro
10.	"La boa"	La Sonora Santanera

== Awards and nominations ==
Year	Award	Category	Nominee(s)	Result
2013	TV Adicto Golden Awards	Best Debut Actress in a Lead Role	Ximena Navarrete	Won
2013	People en Español Awards			
2013	People en Español Awards	Best Telenovela	La Tempestad	Nominated
2013	People en Español Awards	Best Actor	William Levy	Nominated
2013	People en Español Awards	Best Female Villain	Laura Carmine	Nominated
2013	People en Español Awards	Best Male Villain	César Évora	Won
2013	People en Español Awards	Best Male Villain	Iván Sánchez	Nominated
2013	People en Español Awards	Best Supporting Actress	Daniela Romo	Nominated
2013	People en Español Awards	Best New Talent	Ximena Navarrete	Won
2013	People en Español Awards	Couple of the Year	Ximena Navarrete; William Levy	Nominated
2014	Juventud Awards			
2014	Juventud Awards	Girl Of My Dreams	Ximena Navarrete	Nominated
2014	Juventud Awards	What a Hottie!	William Levy	Won
2014	Juventud Awards	Best Telenovela Theme	"Hoy tengo ganas de ti" by Alejandro Fernández and Christina Aguilera	Nominated
2014	TVyNovelas Awards			
2014	TVyNovelas Awards	Best Antagonist Actor	Iván Sánchez	Nominated
2014	TVyNovelas Awards	Best Antagonist Actor	Manuel Ojeda	Won
2014	TVyNovelas Awards	Best Leading Actress	Daniela Romo	Nominated
2014	TVyNovelas Awards	Best Musical Theme	"Hoy tengo ganas de ti" by Alejandro Fernández and Christina Aguilera	Nominated
2014	Bravo Awards	Best Leading Actress	Daniela Romo	Won
