= Bibelot Mansur =

Mexican actress (born 1978)

- Born: Bibelot Almendra Mansur Rodríguez; March 31, 1978 (age 46); Orizaba, Veracruz, Mexico

Bibelot Almendra Mansur Rodríguez (born March 31, 1978) is a Mexican actress, born in Orizaba, Veracruz, Mexico.

Mansur is best known for her most-recent roles in Destilando Amor (2007) as "Acacia", Querida Enemiga (2008) as "Rossy", and Zacatillo, un lugar en tu corazón (2010) as "Gudelia".

== Filmography ==
- Me declaro culpable (2017–2018)...Celia
- La vecina (2015)...Magda
- Como dice el dicho (2012–2013)...Rosana / Leonor
- Amorcito Corazón (2011)...Yazmín
- Zacatillo, un lugar en tu corazón (2010)... Gudelia
- Querida Enemiga (2008) ... Rosalbina "Rossy" López Martínez
- Destilando Amor (2007) ... Acacia
- La Verdad Oculta (2006) ... Mina
- Corazones al límite (2004) ... Patty
- Amarte es mi pecado (2004) ... Pascuala Ocampo
- Niña Amada Mía (2003) ... Choffy
- Amigas y Rivales (2001) ... Estefanny
- Locura de Amor (2000) ... Rubí
- Rivales a Muerte (2000) ... Melina
- Por tu Amor (1999) ... Mercedes
- Tres mujeres (1999) ... Gina
