= La madrastra (2005 TV series) =

- Genre: Telenovela
- Created by: Arturo Moya Grau
- Written by: Liliana Abud (adaptation)
- Directed by: Jorge Édgar Ramírez; Eric Morales
- Starring: Victoria Ruffo; César Évora; Eduardo Capetillo; Jacqueline Andere; Ana Martín; Cecilia Gabriela; Martha Julia; Guillermo García Cantú; René Casados; Sabine Moussier
- Theme music composer: Biagio Antonacci
- Opening theme: "Víveme" performed by Laura Pausini
- Composers: Eduardo Diazayas; Jorge Avendaño Lührs
- Country of origin: Mexico
- Original language: Spanish
- No. of episodes: 120 + 1 after-finale special

Production
- Executive producer: Salvador Mejía Alejandre
- Production locations: Mexico City, Mexico
- Cinematography: Jesús Nájera Saro; Lino Gama Esquinca
- Editors: Marco Antonio Rocha; Pablo Peralta
- Running time: 41-44 minutes
- Production company: Televisa

Original release
- Network: Canal de las Estrellas
- Release: February 7 – July 29, 2005

Related
- La madrastra (1981); Vivir un poco (1985–1986); Para toda la vida (1996); Forever (1996) ¿Quién mató a Patricia Soler? (2014); La madrastra (2022)

La madrastra (English: The Stepmother) is a Mexican telenovela. It was produced by Televisa and broadcast on Canal de las Estrellas in Mexico from Monday, February 7, 2005, through Friday, July 29, 2005. The program became an unexpected success, garnering ratings in excess of 30 points.

Starring Victoria Ruffo and César Évora, who last appeared together in 2000's Abrázame muy fuerte (also produced by Mejia), along with Eduardo Capetillo, Jacqueline Andere, Ana Martín, Cecilia Gabriela, Martha Julia, Guillermo García Cantú, René Casados and Sabine Moussier, La madrastra tells the story of María, a woman who lost twenty years of her life after being falsely accused of murder and who returns to Mexico to exact revenge on her husband and friends who abandoned her and to see her beloved children once more.

La madrastra is fourth in a series of remakes of the 1981 Chilean production of the same name. The program aired five nights a week, Monday through Friday, at 9 pm for 25 weeks. A follow-up special, La madrastra: años después, aired shortly after the finale on Saturday, July 30, 2005.

From June 15 to August 21, 2015 Canal de las Estrellas broadcast reruns at 12:00 noon, replacing Rubí and with Hasta que el dinero nos separe replacing it on August 24.

== Plot ==
A terrible tragedy puts an end to a group of friends' pleasure trip. María (Victoria Ruffo) hears a gunshot; she finds her friend, Patricia (Montserrat Olivier), dead and, in her confusion, she recklessly picks up the gun. María is accused of the murder and sentenced to life in prison. Her husband, Esteban (César Évora), an important businessman, does not believe in her innocence; he divorces her upon returning to Mexico, buys the silence of those who went with them on the trip and tells his children that their mother died in an accident.

Twenty years later, María is released for good behavior and returns to Mexico seeking revenge. She is determined to discover the real culprit and confront Esteban, whom she now detests for having abandoned her to her fate. But what she wants most is to recover her two children, Héctor (Mauricio Aspe) and Estrella (Ana Layevska). The first thing María does upon arriving is to call together all those who participated in the fateful trip: Esteban; Servando (Lorenzo de Rodas), one of his partners; Demetrio (Guillermo García Cantú), the company's lawyer, and his wife, Daniela (Cecilia Gabriela); Bruno (René Casados), the company's other partner, and his wife, Fabiola (Sabine Moussier), and Esteban's two aunts, Carmela (Margarita Isabel) and Alba (Jacqueline Andere). Everyone is surprised to see her enter and María sows doubt and fear in them by informing them that, for twenty years, Patricia's real killer has lived among them.

María remarries Esteban to regain the affection of her children, but this will not be easy for her, since her children consider her a stepmother who has come to usurp the place of a dead mother whom they adore through the portrait of another woman and, in addition, she will have to deal with the intrigues of Esteban's aunts and partners; especially those of Fabiola, who has always been in love with Esteban and hates María. Moreover, María finds out that Esteban has a third son, Ángel (Miguel Ángel Biaggio), and he refuses to reveal who his mother is. Ángel is a sickly and insecure young man and María immediately accepts him and treats him with affection.

Little by little, María wins the love of her children without revealing the true bond that unites them. She helps Estrella to mature and stop being a superficial and fickle girl and to understand that of her two suitors, Carlos (Sergio Mayer) and Greco (José Luis Reséndez), the one who truly loves her is Greco, a good and humble young man; while Carlos is only interested in her money. Héctor is an arrogant young man to whom María teaches a great lesson when he meets Vivian (Michelle Vieth), who was María's prison companion, and falls in love with her. And thanks to María's support, Ángel becomes an optimistic and self-confident person.

However, María's biggest problem is Esteban. María finds herself at a crossroads, because she has realized that she still loves her husband and he loves her. Now, her heart, hardened by twenty years of suffering, loneliness and abandonment, will have to find the strength to choose between the path of justice... and the path of forgiveness.

== Cast ==
=== Main ===
- Victoria Ruffo as María Fernández Acuña
- César Évora as Esteban San Román
- Eduardo Capetillo as Leonel Ibáñez
- Jacqueline Andere as Alba San Román
- Ana Martín as Socorro de Montes
- Cecilia Gabriela as Daniela de Rivero
- Martha Julia as Ana Rosa Márquez
- Guillermo García Cantú as Demetrio Rivero
- René Casados as Bruno Mendizábal
- Sabine Moussier as Fabiola de Mendizábal

=== Also main ===
- Margarita Isabel as Carmela San Román
- Lorenzo de Rodas as Servando Maldonado
- Patricia Reyes Spíndola as Venturina García "La Muda"
- Joaquín Cordero as Father Belisario

=== Recurring and guest stars ===
- Michelle Vieth as Vivian Sousa
- Ana Layevska as Estrella San Román
- Sergio Mayer as Carlos Sánchez
- Mauricio Aspe as Héctor San Román
- Mariana Ríos as Guadalupe "Lupita" Montes
- Miguel Ángel Biaggio as Ángel San Román
- Ximena Herrera as Alma Martínez
- José Luis Reséndez as Greco Montes
- Carlos Bonavides as Rufino Sánchez "El Pulpo"
- Arturo García Tenorio as Leonardo Montes "Da Vinci"
- Liza Willert as Rebeca Robles
- Marcial Casale as Mañas
- Arturo Muñoz as El Panteón
- Rubén Morales as Detective Figueroa
- María Luisa Alcalá as Fanny
- Mariana Karr as Prison guard
- Mario Casillas as Dr. René Rubén
- Montserrat Olivier as Patricia de Ibáñez
- Archie Lanfranco as Lawyer Luciano Cerezuela
- Óscar Morelli as Director of jail
- Sergio Jurado as Detective Muñoz
- Irma Serrano as La Duquesa

== Broadcast history ==
La madrastra premiered on Televisa's El Canal de las Estrellas (XEW-TV) on Monday, February 7, 2005, at 9:00 PM, replacing Mujer de madera. The program aired weeknights at this time for one hour until Friday, July 15, 2005, when the telenovela was originally scheduled to end after a 115-episode run. However, after La madrastra became such a ratings success, Televisa ordered an additional ten episodes, bringing the episode total to 125. These final episodes were reduced from the normal hour length to thirty minutes each, ceding the latter portion of the hour to La esposa virgen. The series finale aired on Friday, July 29, 2005, with the Años después special airing the following evening. It aired on Univision Monday March 21, 2005, 9pm/8c replacing Amor real. The last episode was broadcast Monday September 5, 2005, with La esposa virgen replacing it. The novela was then replaced with La esposa virgen, which expanded to take up the entire hour. Televisa later re-aired the program, with a new ending, in 2007.

=== Prior versions ===
La madrastra is a remake and is the fifth version of this telenovela to be broadcast. The four previous versions are:

- La madrastra (1981), produced by Canal 13 in Chile, with Jael Unger and Walter Kliche.
- Vivir un poco (English: To Live a Little; 1985), produced by Televisa in Mexico, with Angélica Aragón and Rogelio Guerra.
- Para toda la vida (English: For All of Life; 1996), produced by Televisa in Mexico in conjunction with Megavisión in Chile, with Ofelia Medina and Ezequiel Lavandero.
- Forever (1996), produced by Fox Television in the United States in conjunction with Televisa, with Maria Mayenzet and James Richer.

=== DVD release ===
La madrastra was released to region 1 DVD on 21 March 2006. The series was considerably abridged in order to fit on the three double-sided DVD set, which contains 710 minutes of material. In addition to the abridged novela, the release also features the post-finale Años después special, as well as the original trailer for the novela, bloopers, and promotional photographs. The DVD release also has optional English subtitles.

== In popular culture ==
La madrastra was featured in Mexican sketch comedy show La parodia, which spoofed the program in a parody called La madre ésta. The character of María was portrayed by Gaby Ruffo, younger sister of Victoria Ruffo, who plays María in the series.

The telenovela gained notice in the English-speaking United States in 2005 after being featured on numerous episodes of E! network's The Soup. Host Joel McHale often singled out Bruno for the amount of eyeliner that the character wore and "that bitch Alba" for what McHale described as her "crazy eye" that appeared to bulge noticeably larger than the other during particularly intense scenes. The Soup also mocked particular scenes of the novela, such as when Alba poisoned Rebeca with rat poison, causing the latter to flail and foam at the mouth before dramatically dying on the floor. McHale at one point emphatically stated that "I can think of fifteen network shows I understand that aren't this good!"

== Awards and nominations ==
=== 2006 TVyNovelas Awards ===
Category	Recipient	Result
Best Telenovela	Salvador Mejía Alejandre	Nominated
Best Actress	Victoria Ruffo	Nominated
Best Actor	César Évora	Nominated
Best Antagonist Actress	Jacqueline Andere	Nominated
Best Antagonist Actor	Guillermo García Cantú	Nominated
Best Leading Actress	Ana Martín	Nominated
Best Leading Actor	Joaquín Cordero	Nominated
Best Supporting Actress	Margarita Isabel	Nominated
Best Supporting Actor	René Casados	Nominated
Best Young Lead Actress	Ana Layevska	Nominated
Best Young Lead Actor	José Luis Reséndez	Nominated
Best Young Lead Actor	Mauricio Aspe	Won
Best Musical Theme	"Víveme" by Laura Pausini	Nominated
Best Direction	Jorge Édgar Ramírez; Eric Morales	Won

=== 2006 Bravo Awards ===
Category	Recipient	Result
Best Leading Actress	Victoria Ruffo	Won

=== 2006 Latin ACE Awards ===
Category	Recipient	Result
Best Scenic Program	La madrastra	Won
Best Actress	Jacqueline Andere	Won
Most Outstanding Character Actress	Sabine Moussier	Won

=== Golden Awards Of The Decade ===
Category	Recipient	Result
Best Remake or Import	La madrastra	Won
