= Mi Destino Eres Tú =

Mexican telenovela

- Mi destino eres tú
- Genre: Telenovela; Romance; Drama
- Created by: Carmen Daniels; Jorge Lozano Soriano
- Written by: Martha Carrillo; Cristina García; Ricardo Fiallega; Carlos Mercado; Gilberto de Anda
- Directed by: Miguel Córcega; Mónica Miguel
- Starring: Lucero; Jorge Salinas; Susana Zabaleta; Mauricio Islas; Jaime Camil
- Opening theme: "Mi destino eres tú" performed by Lucero
- Country of origin: Mexico
- Original language: Spanish
- No. of episodes: 90

Production
- Executive producer: Carla Estrada
- Producer: Arturo Lorca
- Production locations: Filming; Televisa San Ángel; Mexico City, Mexico; Locations; Mexico City, D.F., Mexico
- Cinematography: Alejandro Frutos; Juan Carlos Frutos
- Camera setup: Multi-camera
- Running time: 41-44 minutes
- Production company: Televisa

Original release
- Network: Canal de las Estrellas
- Release: July 10 – November 13, 2000

Mi destino eres tú (English: You Are my Destiny) is a Mexican telenovela produced by Carla Estrada for Televisa that premiered on July 10, 2000 and ended on November 10, 2000.

It is an original story by Carmen Daniels and Jorge Lozano Soriano which was adapted for television by Martha Carrillo and Cristina García.

It stars Lucero, Jorge Salinas, Susana Zabaleta, Mauricio Islas and Jaime Camil.

Lucero sang the theme song of the series, being released in the album Mi destino.

== Plot ==
Andrea San Vicente (Lucero) is a young lawyer who is modern and intelligent. She has a passion for justice which takes her to defend the rights of the most vulnerable. That same passion will lead her to uncovering the truth concerning her past, which she doesn't know anything about.

Andrea lives in a house in a private middle class section in Mexico City with her aunt, Zulema (Sylvia Pasquel), her uncle, Anselmo (Héctor Ortega), her younger sister, Gina (Sherlyn), and her cousin, Magda (Andrea Torre). Zulema has made the girls believe that their parents died in an accident, but the reality is different.

Andrea and her sister have grown up as part of a family, a fact for which Zulema tells them they ought to be grateful. After all, they were given a home and education. Andrea has become the main source of income in the family, since her uncle, Anselmo, has had diabetes for years and this doesn't allow him to work.

Andrea falls in love with Ramiro (Mauricio Islas), a young man of better economic position than her. They are about to marry, but they have to confront many obstacles, mainly the rounding opposition of Samuel (Luis Bayardo), who is Ramiro's father, and the lies and intrigues of Sofía (Natalia Streignard), an ex-girlfriend of Ramiro.

Andrea and Ramiro eventually get over all those obstacles and finally get married, but life has a cruel game in store for the two: during their honeymoon and after having consummated their marriage, Ramiro dies all of a sudden and leaves Andrea in a terrible loneliness. Andrea has become a widow being so young and now she has to confront a fate she had never expected.

Andrea takes refuge in her work and her studies, since she is doing a master's degree in psychology. Not only has she buried Ramiro, but also all of her possibilities to love have gone with him.....or at least that is what she thinks. Without looking for it and without even imagining it, two men of distinct character will come into her life: Eduardo Rivadeneira (Jorge Salinas) and Mauricio Rodríguez (Jaime Camil); but only one of them will be her destiny.

== Cast ==
=== Main ===
- Lucero as Andrea San Vicente Fernández
- Jorge Salinas as Eduardo Rivadeneira del Encino
- Susana Zabaleta as Emma Pimentel de Rivadeneira
- Mauricio Islas as Ramiro Galindo Suárez
- Jaime Camil as Mauricio Rodríguez Calderón

=== Recurring and guest stars ===
- Jacqueline Andere as Nuria del Encino
- Julio Alemán as Augusto Rodríguez Franco
- Sylvia Pasquel as Zulema Fernández de Sánchez
- Jorge Reynoso as Genaro Gil
- Azela Robinson as Isaura Becker
- Cynthia Klitbo as Amara Trujillo
- Jorge Muñiz as Father Rodrigo
- Orlando Carrió as Enrique San Vicente Ordóñez
- Patsy as Claudia
- Natalia Streignard as Sofía Devesa Leyva
- Juan Alfonso Baptista as "El Gato"
- Jorge Vargas as Héctor Valderrama
- Lorena Herrera as Olga Ramos Moret
- Magda Guzmán as Nina
- Carmelita González as Asunción Rivadeneira
- Silvia Mariscal as María Suárez de Galindo
- Héctor Ortega as Anselmo Sánchez Pérez
- Jan as Fernando Rivadeneira del Encino
- Mike as César Becker
- Luis Bayardo as Samuel Galindo Betancourt
- Jerry Rivera as Himself
- Jon Secada as Himself
- Raymundo Capetillo as Sergio Rivadeneira
- Guillermo Aguilar as Gaspar Linares Saval
- Ana María Aguirre as Teresa "Tere" del Alba de Legorreta
- Anthony Álvarez as Luis
- Amparo Arozamena as Chonita
- Raúl Buenfil as Héctor
- Sylvia Eugenia as Juliana Rodríguez Calderón
- Miguel Galván as Evaristo Reyes Hernández
- Mariana Karr as Irene
- Lucero León as Elena de Pimentel
- Sherlyn as Georgina "Gina" San Vicente Fernández
- Sheyla as Celia López Hernández
- Abraham Stavans as Francisco Canseco
- Andrea Torre as Magdalena "Magda" Sánchez Fernández
- Andrea Lagunes as Ximena Rivadeneira Pimentel
- Cosme Alberto as Juan "Juancho" Reyes Solís
- Joaquín Cordero as José Ignacio Rivadeneira Orendáin
- María Sorté as Amparo Calderón de Rodríguez

== Awards and nominations ==
Year	Award	Category	Nominee(s)	Result
2001	19th TVyNovelas Awards	Best Actress	Lucero	Won
2001	19th TVyNovelas Awards	Best Actor	Jorge Salinas	Nominated
2001	19th TVyNovelas Awards	Best Antagonist Actress	Susana Zabaleta	Nominated
2001	19th TVyNovelas Awards	Best Male Revelation	Jaime Camil	Nominated
2001	19th TVyNovelas Awards	Best Kiss	Lucero; Jorge Salinas	Nominated
2001	19th TVyNovelas Awards	Best Fight	Jorge Salinas; Jaime Camil	Nominated
2001	19th TVyNovelas Awards	Best Action Sequence	Lucero	Nominated
