= Qué pobres tan ricos =

Mexican telenovela

- Genre: Telenovela
- Based on: Pobres Rico
- Written by: Pedro Armando Rodríguez; Alejandra Romero; Humberto Robles; Héctor Valdés
- Screenplay by: Adriana Lorenzón; Juan Manuel Cáceres Niño
- Story by: Juan Manuel Cáceres Niño; Héctor Alejandro Moncada Valenzuela; Liliana Guzmán Zárate
- Directed by: Benjamín Cann; Rodrigo Hernández
- Creative director: Florencio Zavala
- Starring: Jaime Camil; Zuria Vega; Mark Tacher; Arturo Peniche; Ingrid Martz
- Music by: Carlos Páramo; Juan Pablo Plasencia
- Opening theme: "Mi Tesoro" by Jesse & Joy
- Country of origin: Mexico
- Original language: Spanish
- No. of seasons: 1
- No. of episodes: 166

Production
- Executive producer: Rosy Ocampo
- Producers: Eduardo Meza; María Alba Espinosa
- Cinematography: Daniel Ferrer; Alejandro Álvarez
- Editor: Pablo Peralta
- Production company: Televisa

Original release
- Network: Canal de las Estrellas
- Release: 11 November 2013 – 29 June 2014

Qué pobres tan ricos (English title: The Poor Rich Family), is a Mexican telenovela produced by Rosy Ocampo and broadcast by Canal de las Estrellas. It is based on Colombian telenovela Pobres Rico.

Jaime Camil and Zuria Vega star as the protagonists; with Arturo Peniche as the co-protagonist; while Mark Tacher, Ingrid Martz, Tiare Scanda and the first actress Raquel Pankowsky star as the main antagonists, with the participation of Sylvia Pasquel, Manuel "Flaco" Ibáñez, and the first actress Queta Lavat.

As of November 11, 2013, Las Estrellas started broadcasting Qué pobres tan ricos weeknights at 20:25, replacing Libre para amarte. The last episode was broadcast on June 29, 2014, with Mi corazón es tuyo replacing it the following day.

Univision broadcast Qué pobres tan ricos from January 6, 2014, weeknights at 22:00, replacing one hour of Lo que la vida me robó. The last episode was broadcast on August 24, 2014, with La malquerida replacing it the following day.

The finale of Qué pobres tan ricos averaged 3.9 million viewers on Univision.

== Plot ==
María Guadalupe "Lupita" Menchaca Martínez is a single mother, living with her son, alongside the rest of her family —- father, brother, and sister in a typical middle-class neighborhood in Mexico City. Miguel Ángel Ruizpalacios Romagnoli is a perfect exponent of the upper class. He is a millionaire and has no problem in sight. He lives on rumba, gambling and women and it doesn't matter what happens to the company of which he is president by inheritance. Lupita and Miguel Ángel do not know each other and seemingly have nothing in common. Their worlds are different, their social classes do not cross, and their personalities have little to do with each other. However, destiny is responsible for crossing them so unexpectedly.

Victim of a trap of his cousin Alejo, who wants to be the president of the company, Miguel Ángel is accused of using the company's money to launder assets and a current account of incoming non-holy money. Miguel Ángel is not only wanted by the police, but his life and that of the Ruizpalacios family changes from one day to the next: all the accounts closed, Miguel's assets are seized, and if he does not appear, they are to be considered fugitives from justice.

Desperate and without knowing whom to turn to, Miguel Ángel decides to listen to his grandmother Matilde, who claims that they own land on the outskirts of the city that his grandfather once bought. With intentions to sell them and to make off cash money, Miguel Ángel undertakes the crusade of recovering them facing the Menchaca, the family that lives there and assures to own the place that they once bought from his grandfather. As there is no evidence of either, nor of the other the Ruizpalacios have no other choice but to settle down to live with the Menchaca, in what is the only house with which they have, as well as a restaurant and a hall of events. The meeting of these two worlds is very comical. First, because the Ruizpalacios do not understand how the Menchaca live. If you have your own room with a private bathroom, the Ruizpalacios spend the night sleeping together in cabin beds and sharing a single bathroom among the more than 10 people who live in the house. Secondly, because in their life they never worked and now they will have to survive in some way, learning the activities that the Menchaca develop, for them, one more humiliating than the other.

Thirdly because Miguel Ángel is nothing more and nothing less than Alejo's cousin, the man who ruined Lupita's life. Despite all the setbacks, the impossibility of coexistence and the crazy crosses between rich and poor, love between Lupita and Miguel Ángel arises with a force that neither can stop, and that force causes that with the entire time everything seems to be irreconcilable begins to have a why. This is how they deeply hate each other, the Menchaca and the Ruizpalacios become part of the same side with one goal in common: to help Miguel Ángel recover everything he lost in exchange for the club and the house to stay with the Menchaca . Everything seems to go on wheels until obstacles happen such as when Alejo attacks with all his arms to destroy Lupita, claiming paternity of his son, who he wants to take over as he may; Minerva who has always been in love with Miguel Ángel and only wants Alejo for his money, will stand in the love that begins to appear between Lupita and Miguel Ángel using various tricks with his mother to keep the money of Alejo and claim the love of Miguel Ángel.

== Cast ==
=== Main ===
- Jaime Camil as Miguel Ángel Ruizpalacios Romagnoli
- Zuria Vega as María Guadalupe Menchaca Martínez
- Mark Tacher as Alejo Ruizpalacios Saravia
- Arturo Peniche as Nepomuceno Escandiondas
- Ingrid Martz as Minerva Fontanet Blanco

==== Secondary ====
- Manuel "Flaco" Ibáñez as Jesús Menchaca
- Zaide Silvia Gutiérrez as Carmelita de Menchaca
- Tiaré Scanda as Vilma Terán Sade
- Agustín Arana as Saúl Ballesteros
- Gabriela Zamora as La Güendy de Escandiondas
- Raquel Pankowsky as Isela Blanco
- Queta Lavat as Matilde Álvarez de Ruizpalacios
- Natasha Dupeyrón as Frida Ruizpalacios Romagnoli
- Gaby Mellado as Macarena Larrea Condesa de Valladolid
- Diego de Erice as Leonardo Ruizpalacios Romagnoli
- Jonathan Becerra as José Tizoc Menchaca Martínez
- Álex Perea as Tomás
- Abril Rivera as Perla Ivette Menchaca Martínez
- José Pablo Minor as Tato
- José Eduardo Derbez as Diego Armando Escandiondas
- Jacqueline García as Jennifer
- Ricardo Margaleff as Jonathan
- Manuel Guízar as Salomón
- Homero Ferruzca as Brandon
- Gustavo Rojo as Aureliano
- Roberto Blandón as Adolfo
- Rebeca Mankita as Genóveva
- Lorena Velázquez as Isabel
- Polo Ortín as Flavio
- Luis Gatica as Osiel
- Moisés Suárez
- Silvia Pasquel as Ana Sofía Romagnoli Tolentino de Ruizpalacios
- Mark Tacher as Alejo Ruiz Palacios Zarabia

=== Guest ===
- Mariana Karr as Covadonga
- Gabriel Soto as Himself
- Cecilia Gabriela as Rita

== Awards and nominations ==
Year	Association	Category	Nominated	Result
2014	Premios Juventud	He's Hot!	Jaime Camil	Nominated
2014	Premios Juventud	Best Theme Novelero	Jesse & Joy “Mi Tesoro”	Nominated
2015	33rd TVyNovelas Awards	Best Telenovela of the Year	Rosy Ocampo	Nominated
2015	33rd TVyNovelas Awards	Best Lead Actress	Zuria Vega	Nominated
2015	33rd TVyNovelas Awards	Best Co-star Actress	Sylvia Pasquel	Nominated
2015	33rd TVyNovelas Awards	Best Co-star Actor	Arturo Peniche	Nominated
2015	33rd TVyNovelas Awards	Best First Actor	Manuel "Flaco" Ibáñez	Won
2015	33rd TVyNovelas Awards	Best Supporting Actress	Tiaré Scanda	Nominated
2015	33rd TVyNovelas Awards	Best Young Lead Actress	Natasha Dupeyron	Nominated
2015	33rd TVyNovelas Awards	Best Young Lead Actor	José Eduardo Derbez	Won
2015	33rd TVyNovelas Awards	Best Cast	Que pobres tan Ricos	Nominated
2015	33rd TVyNovelas Awards	Best Direction	Benjamín Cann and Rodrigo Zaunbos	Nominated
2015	Favoritos del Público TVyNovelas Awards	La Mas Guapa	Zuria Vega	Won
2015	Favoritos del Público TVyNovelas Awards	Favorite Final	Qué pobres tan ricos	Nominated
