= Amarte es mi Pecado =

Mexican telenovela

- Genre: Telenovela
- Created by: Liliana Abud
- Written by: Jaime García Estrada; Orlando Merino
- Directed by: Benjamín Cann; Rodrigo Zaunbos
- Starring: Yadhira Carrillo; Sergio Sendel; Alessandra Rosaldo; Sylvia Pasquel; Alexis Ayala; René Casados
- Theme music composer: Jorge Avendaño
- Opening theme: "Amarte es mi pecado" performed by Alessandra Rosaldo and Ricardo Montaner
- Ending theme: "Aún así" performed by Alessandra Rosaldo
- Country of origin: Mexico
- Original language: Spanish
- No. of episodes: 95

Production
- Executive producer: Ernesto Alonso
- Producer: Luis Miguel Barona
- Running time: 41-44 minutes
- Production company: Televisa

Original release
- Network: Canal de las Estrellas
- Release: January 5 – May 14, 2004

Amarte es mi pecado (International title: My Love, My Sin) is a Mexican telenovela produced by Ernesto Alonso for Televisa in 2004.

The series stars Yadhira Carrillo, Sergio Sendel, Alessandra Rosaldo, Sylvia Pasquel, Alexis Ayala and René Casados.

In the United States, Univision broadcast Amarte es mi pecado weeknights at 9pm/8c from June 14, 2004 to October 22, 2004.

== Plot ==
In the city of Pátzcuaro lives Nora (Yadhira Carrillo), a beautiful young woman full of dreams. She is envied by women and admired by men, yet she only has eyes for Alfredo (Alejandro Ibarra), a handsome young man with few resources. Her father, Jacobo (Manuel Ojeda), continually insists that she should marry a rich and important man. Since his health is delicate, Nora keeps her romance with Alfredo a secret, so as not to upset him. After Jacobo's death, Nora suffers a devastating disappointment when Isaura (Sylvia Pasquel), her stepmother, sells her to Heriberto (Antonio Medellín), the richest man in Pátzcuaro... with Alfredo's complicity!

In defense of her honor while being sexually harassed by Heriberto, Nora shoots him, but he does not press charges to avoid a scandal. However, pressured by the gossip of the neighbors, Nora goes to live in Morelia with her aunt, Alejandra (Margarita Isabel).

In Morelia, Nora meets Arturo (Sergio Sendel) and gives herself passionately to him. Arturo loves her, but he must go abroad where he is offered the job he has always dreamed of, as a pilot on a commercial aviation line. Arturo promises that he will come back to marry her, and Nora is happy making preparations for her wedding secretly from Alejandra.

In a chance encounter, Arturo meets Paulina (Alessandra Rosaldo); and they are both surprised the next morning, when they discover that they have slept together. They say farewell because they have urgent and unavoidable obligations. When Paulina returns to Mexico, she confesses what happened to her fiancé, Juan Carlos (René Casados). He is sympathetic and insists on going through with their wedding plans; but she hesitates, as she realizes that she has fallen in love with Arturo.

Nora discovers that she is expecting Arturo's child, but before she can tell him, Arturo receives a call from Paulina informing him that she is pregnant. Arturo's sense of responsibility forces him to tell Nora what happened. Nora feels betrayed again; she keeps quiet about her pregnancy and decides to dedicate herself completely to the child she is expecting. Fate, however, is merciless with her.

Completely shattered, Nora swears never to love again and remakes her life with a single purpose in mind: to take advantage of her beauty to exploit men. Converted into a tough woman, Nora will live from now on only to make a fortune at whoever's expense and to seek, at any cost, a way to take revenge on Arturo, whom she wants to hate with all her soul, but she can't stop loving him, because loving him is her sin.

== Cast ==
=== Main ===
- Yadhira Carrillo as Leonora "Nora" Guzmán Madrigal de Horta
- Sergio Sendel as Arturo Sandoval de Anda
- Alessandra Rosaldo as Paulina Almazán Miranda
- Sylvia Pasquel as Isaura Ávila de Guzmán
- Alexis Ayala as Leonardo Muñoz de Santiago
- René Casados as Juan Carlos Orellana

=== Recurring and guest stars ===
- Luis Gimeno as Clemente Sandoval
- Adriana Roel as Gertrudis de la Mora de Reyes
- Antonio Medellín as Heriberto Reyes
- Aarón Hernán as Joaquín Arcadio
- Eugenio Cobo as Hipólito
- Sergio Ramos "El Comanche" as Silverio Almazán
- Macaria as Dr. Clara Santacruz
- Ninón Sevilla as Galia de Caridad
- Luis Bayardo as Manolo Tapia
- Óscar Servín as Roque Ramos
- Roberto Antúnez as Genaro Hernán
- Emilia Carranza as Pilar Cansino
- Alonso Echánove as Felipe Fernández del Ara
- Xavier Marc as Evaristo López-Monfort
- Julio Monterde as Father Javier Lucio
- María Prado as Chole Ocampo
- Josefina Echánove as Damiana Mendiola
- Antonio Miguel as Víctor Garduño
- Tiaré Scanda as Casilda Gómez / Casilda Guzmán Madrigal de Horta
- Odiseo Bichir as Sergio Samaniego
- Alejandro Ibarra as Alfredo Rangel Gómez / Alfredo de la Mora
- Alejandro Ruiz as Diego Fernández del Ara
- Íngrid Martz as Renata Quiroga
- Silvia Manríquez as Ana María de Fernández del Ara
- Dacia Arcaráz as Diana
- Juan Carlos Casasola as Gonzalo Carrera
- Jan as Roberto Peña
- José Ángel García as Julián Quiroga
- Virginia Gimeno as Rebeca Duarte
- Verónica Jaspeado as Mirta Fernández del Ara
- Mauricio Aspe as Rafael Almazán Miranda
- David Ramos as José "Pepe" Luis Reséndez
- Bibelot Mansur as Pascuala Ocampo
- Jerardo as Agustín
- Tatiana Rodríguez as Jessica del Valle
- Farah Abud as Cristina Palacios Moret
- Verónica Toussaint as Jazmín
- Óscar Ferretti as Baltazar Duarte
- Conrado Osorio as Sandro
- Erika Buenfil as Gisela de López-Monfort
- Margarita Isabel as Alejandra Madrigal de Horta
- Manuel Ojeda as Jacobo Guzmán
- Juan Peláez as Carmelo Quintero
- Sergio Reynoso as Félix Palacios García
- Gabriela Goldsmith as Kathy de Quiroga
- Roberto Ballesteros as Marcelo Previdi
- Sergio Sánchez as Dr. Bermúdez
- Roberto Sen as Dr. Lozano
- Ofelia Guilmáin as Covadonga Linares

== Awards and nominations ==
| Year | Award | Category | Nominee(s) | Result |
|---|---|---|---|---|
| 2004 | TVyNovelas Awards | Best Telenovela | Ernesto Alonso | Nominated |
| 2004 | TVyNovelas Awards | Best Actress | Yadhira Carrillo | Nominated |
| 2004 | TVyNovelas Awards | Best Actor | Sergio Sendel | Nominated |
| 2004 | TVyNovelas Awards | Best Antagonist Actress | Sylvia Pasquel | Nominated |
| 2004 | TVyNovelas Awards | Best Leading Actress | Sylvia Pasquel | Nominated |
| 2004 | TVyNovelas Awards | Best Co-lead Actress | Tiaré Scanda | Nominated |
| 2004 | TVyNovelas Awards | Best Co-lead Actor | Alexis Ayala | Nominated |
| 2004 | TVyNovelas Awards | Best Female Revelation | Alessandra Rosaldo | Nominated |
| 2004 | TVyNovelas Awards | Best Male Revelation | Jan | Won |
| 2004 | TVyNovelas Awards | Best Musical Theme | "Amarte es mi pecado" by Ricardo Montaner | Won |
| 2004 | TVyNovelas Awards | Best Musical Theme Composer | Jorge Avendaño | Won |
| 2010 | Golden Awards Of The Decade | Best Original Story | Amarte es mi pecado | Won |

== Remake ==
In 2022, TelevisaUnivision produced a remake titled Mujer de nadie starring Livia Brito, Marcus Ornellas and Arap Bethke.
