= El noveno mandamiento =

Mexican telenovela

- Genre: Telenovela; Romance; Drama
- Created by: Ximena Suárez; Virginia Quintana
- Developed by: Alejandra León de la Barra
- Story by: René Allouis
- Directed by: Gastón Tuset; Xavier Marc; Eric Morales
- Starring: Daniela Castro; Francisco Gattorno; Alma Muriel
- Theme music composer: Adrián Posse; Cynthia Salazar
- Opening theme: "Mi amor es un pecado" by Innis "Quiero" by Jerry Rivera
- Composers: Fernando de Miguélez; Roberto Valenzuela
- Country of origin: Mexico
- Original language: Spanish
- No. of episodes: 80

Production
- Executive producer: Lucero Suárez
- Cinematography: Gabriel Vázquez Bulmán; Armando Zafra
- Editor: Socorro Manrique
- Camera setup: Multi-camera
- Running time: 41-44 minutes
- Production company: Televisa

Original release
- Network: Canal de las Estrellas
- Release: January 15 – May 4, 2001

El noveno mandamiento (Lit: The Ninth Commandment / English title: Forbidden Attraction) is a Mexican telenovela produced by Lucero Suárez for Televisa in 2001.

On Monday, January 15, 2001, Canal de las Estrellas started broadcasting El noveno mandamiento weekdays at 5:00pm, replacing El precio de tu amor. The last episode was broadcast on Friday, May 4, 2001, with Atrévete a olvidarme replacing it the Monday.

The 1st part stars Daniela Castro, Armando Araiza and Chantal Andere, while the 2nd part also stars Castro, alongside Francisco Gattorno and Alma Muriel.

== Plot ==
Isabel is a sensitive, sweet, and determined woman who suffers from diabetes. Although she is not weak-willed, ever since her parents died she has been manipulated by her sister, Clara, who is tormented by the idea of becoming a spinster. The only suitable match is Isabel's fiancé, for whom she harbors an overwhelming passion. The wedding between Isabel and Leandro is postponed due to a business trip he is taking. Clara tries to dissuade him from marrying her, telling him that Isabel doesn't have much time left to live. He ignores her. On the contrary, Isabel and Leandro decide to spend the night before his trip together. They arrange to meet at the barn, but Clara finds out. She and her loyal servant, Andrés, plot an accident to prevent Isabel from meeting with Leandro, and Clara goes to the dark barn dressed, perfumed, and made up as Isabel. Leandro, who arrives at the barn intoxicated, spends the night with Clara. For Isabel, finding them together is a devastating blow.

Clara leads Isabel to believe that Leandro only became her boyfriend out of pity, believing her to be dying. Adding to this, Clara fakes a pregnancy. Isabel suffers a severe diabetic crisis and, believing she will die, asks Leandro, "as her last wish", to marry Clara. Leandro is immensely unhappy with a woman he detests, but he doesn't give up and manages to find proof that Clara set a trap for him. Isabel, realizing the deception, gives herself to Leandro in a sublime act of love. Andrés tries to take the incriminating evidence from Leandro. In the struggle, Leandro falls, hits his head, and loses his memory. Taking advantage of the situation, Clara makes him believe they are a happy couple and that her sister has always tried to separate them. She also threatens Isabel's life, forcing her to flee to Mexico City, where she discovers she is pregnant.

In contrast, Clara can no longer maintain the lie of her pregnancy, and Leandro, who has regained his memory, is on the verge of leaving her. But she manages to cause another accident and make Leandro feel guilty for her "losing" the baby. Bound by guilt and believing that Isabel has moved on with another man, Leandro remains with Clara in a stormy and unhealthy relationship. The former takes refuge in alcohol and is constantly torn between staying or leaving; the latter suffers Leandro's reproaches and contempt and desperately tries to win his heart, or at least keep him.

In one of her last attempts, Clara asks a dying cousin to leave her newborn daughter in the care of Leandro and her. The cousin dies after obtaining Leandro's promise to take care of the child. The baby also dies, but Clara replaces her with the daughter of her servant Andrés, whom she names Fabiola. Isabel gives birth to a beautiful baby girl, whom she names Ana, but fate soon separates her from her. Ana arrives at Clara's farm without knowing who her parents are. There she meets Fabiola, who grows up as the owner of the "Las Lágrimas" farm. Ana also meets the neighbors: Rodrigo and Bruno Betancourt, heirs to the best lands in the region. Just as the Betancourt brothers fall in love with Ana, Ana and Fabiola fall in love with Rodrigo, thus creating a love triangle between these characters, violating the Ninth commandment.

== Cast ==
1st part

- Daniela Castro as Isabel / Ana
- Armando Araiza as Leandro
- Chantal Andere as Clara
- Martha Roth as Eugenia
- Salvador Sánchez as Andrés
- Ernesto Godoy as Ramiro
- Lupita Lara as Elena
- Héctor Sáez as Father Juan
- Arlette Pacheco as Alicia
- Zulema Cruz as Carmen
- Luis Reynoso as Óscar
- Bárbara Gómez as Tomasa
- Gustavo Negrete as Álvaro
- Maripaz García as Margarita
- Martín Rojas as Juancho
- Jorge Capín as Efrén
- Liza Burton as Salomé
- Francisco Gattorno as Rodrigo
- Alma Muriel as Adult Clara
- Alex Ibarra as Bruno
- Ana Patricia Rojo as Fabiola

2nd part

- Daniela Castro as Ana
- Francisco Gattorno as Rodrigo
- Alma Muriel as Clara
- Martha Roth as Eugenia
- Salvador Sánchez as Andrés
- Juan Carlos Serrán as Leandro
- Hilda Aguirre as María
- Arsenio Campos as Ramiro
- Octavio Galindo as Vicente
- Arlette Pacheco as Alicia
- Zulema Cruz as Carmen
- Graciela Bernardo as Lola
- Roberto Miquel as Jorge
- Marcia Coutiño as Sofía
- Claudia Elisa Aguilar as Sabina
- Juan Imperio as Mariano
- Eduardo Cáceres as Bernardo
- Arturo Paulet as Onésimo
- Alejandro Ruiz as Diego
- Alberto Estrella as Felipe
- Yurem Rojas as El Ratón
- Ulises Pliego as Pablo
- Sylvia Lomelí as Gaby
- Alex Ibarra as Bruno
- Ana Patricia Rojo as Fabiola
