= Querida enemiga =

Mexican telenovela

- Genre: Telenovela
- Screenplay by: Carmen Sepúlveda; Edwin Valencia; Lucero Suárez
- Story by: Erika Johanson; Pablo Serra
- Directed by: Claudia Elisa Aguilar; Gastón Tuset
- Creative director: Sandra Cortés
- Starring: Ana Layevska; Gabriel Soto
- Theme music composer: Mauricio Arriaga; Eduardo Murguía
- Opening theme: "Te ha robado" performed by Manuel Mijares
- Country of origin: Mexico
- Original language: Spanish
- No. of episodes: 110

Production
- Executive producer: Lucero Suárez
- Producer: Ángel Villaverde
- Production locations: Mexico City, Mexico
- Cinematography: Miguel Valdés; Víctor Soto; Gilberto Macín
- Editors: Mauricio Cortés; Omar Blanco
- Camera setup: Multi-camera
- Production company: Televisa

Original release
- Network: Canal de las Estrellas
- Release: May 12 – October 10, 2008

Querida enemiga (English: Dear Enemy) is a Mexican telenovela produced by Lucero Suárez for Televisa in 2008. The telenovela aired on Canal de las Estrellas from May 12, 2008 to October 10, 2008. The series stars Ana Layevska and Gabriel Soto.

In the United States, Univision broadcast Querida enemiga from June 23, 2008 to November 28, 2008.

== Plot ==
Lorena and Sara were raised together in an orphanage, and even though they have different personalities, they loved each other as sisters. Lorena dreams of starting her own family and loves to cook, while Sara is more materialistic; she has always hated the poverty of the orphanage, and she has more ambitions than values.

Lorena's greatest wish is to become a chef and so, one day she says goodbye to the nuns who raised her at the orphanage and leaves to study cuisine in Mexico City. That same day, Madre Asunción discovers that Sara had stolen some of the funds of the orphanage. However, after she confronts Sara, she suffers a heart attack and dies. To avoid getting caught any further, Sara runs with her lover and accomplice Chalo, who is also the delivery guy/driver of the orphanage. But before she leaves, she goes through the files Madre Asunción had in her office for each orphaned child and stole two files – hers and Lorena's.

When she finally reads them, she learns that she was found in the garbage dump, while Lorena was abandoned in the orphanage without explanation by her grandmother, the millionaire Hortensia Vallejo Vda. de Armendáriz. Sara's first impulse is to find Lorena and help her confront her grandmother and demand her rights, but then she reconsiders her options and decides to usurp her place in the Armendáriz gastronomic empire. Believing she would never see Lorena again, Sara thought her plan was foolproof.

Unaware of what happened, Lorena finds work as a cook's aid in her own grandmother's company – a lady who is ruthless in her work area and demands perfection from all her workers. Lorena also meets a young doctor called Alonso and they fall in love with each other at first sight. Later on, Sara has an unexpected reunion with Lorena in the company and the girl's constant presence infuriates her and feels that if Lorena were to ever know the truth of her past she may want to reclaim what is truly hers and she would be once again poor. So Sara's mind betrays her and she is gradually overwhelmed by a desire to take everything away from Lorena, including Alonso, and get rid of her once and for all.

When Lorena learns that Sara was abandoned by her grandmother, she cries for her friend and is filled with contempt for Hortensia. Meanwhile, Hortensia uses all her resources to avoid confronting the pain she has caused to everyone around her. Eventually, Sara managed to take away everything that belonged to Lorena, her life, her love and even her parents who for a while believed Sara to be their long lost daughter.

When Lorena starts to discover Sara's evil machinations against her, she realizes that she never truly knew the one she loved as a sister. But in spite of her broken heart, she will bravely face betrayal, deceit and cruelty and even find a new hope with someone she never expected to love – Ernesto, a man who at first glance seemed the total opposite of who she was. She never dreamed that they would have something special between them, but Ernesto managed to convince her otherwise. Slowly he reconstructs Lorena's broken heart, healing it with his love for her and showing her to love and trust someone else again.

== Cast ==
=== Main ===
- Ana Layevska as Lorena de la Cruz
- Gabriel Soto as Alonso Ugarte Solano

=== Recurring ===
- María Rubio as Hortensia Armendáriz
- Luz María Jerez as Bárbara Amescua de Armendáriz
- Carmen Becerra as Sara de la Cruz
- Socorro Bonilla as Zulema de Armendáriz
- Alfonso Iturralde as Omar Armendáriz
- Héctor Ortega as Toribio Ugarte
- Danna Paola as Bettina Aguilar Ugarte
- Mauricio Aspe as Arturo Sabogal Huerta
- Miguel Ángel Biaggio as Chalo Carrasco
- Marco Méndez as Bruno Palma
- Luz Elena González as Diana Ruiz
- Bibelot Mansur as Rossy López Martínez
- Patricia Martínez as María Eugenia "Maruja" Martínez de Armendáriz
- Sharis Cid as Paula Ugarte Solano
- Eduardo Rivera as Darío Aguilar
- Zully Keith as Catalina Huerta
- Dalilah Polanco as Greta
- José Carlos Femat as Julián Ruiz
- Alexandra Graña as Jacqueline Hernández
- Adanely Núñez as Valeria
- José Manuel Lechuga as Vasco Armendáriz Amescua
- María Alicia Delgado as Mother Trinidad
- Mercedes Vaughan as Mother Carmelita
- Jorge Aravena as Ernesto Mendiola Chávez

=== Guest stars ===
- Nuria Bages as Mother Asunción

== Awards and nominations ==
Year	Award	Category	Nominee	Result
2009	27th TVyNovelas Awards	Best Telenovela	Lucero Suárez	Nominated
2009	27th TVyNovelas Awards	Best Young Lead Actress	Danna Paola	Nominated

== Remake ==
In Greece, Mega Channel bought the rights to make its own version, called Η ζωή της άλλης (The Life of the Other); it was broadcast for three seasons, between 2009 and 2013.
