= Así son ellas =

Mexican telenovela

- Genre: Telenovela; Drama
- Created by: Carlos Mercado Orduña
- Written by: Luis Reynoso
- Directed by: Raúl Araiza
- Starring: Erika Buenfil; Lourdes Munguía; Leticia Perdigón; Luz María Jerez; Gabriela Goldsmith
- Opening theme: Así son ellas by Nicho Hinojosa
- Country of origin: Mexico
- Original language: Spanish
- No. of episodes: 90

Production
- Executive producer: Raúl Araiza
- Production locations: Filming; Televisa San Ángel; Mexico City, Mexico
- Camera setup: Multi-camera
- Running time: 41-44 minutes
- Production company: Televisa

Original release
- Network: Canal de las Estrellas
- Release: September 23, 2002 – January 24, 2003

Así son ellas (English: So are those) is a Mexican telenovela produced by Raúl Araiza for Televisa in 2002.

On Monday, September 23, 2002, Canal de las Estrellas started broadcasting Así son ellas weekdays at 8:00 p.m., replacing La Otra. The last episode was broadcast on Friday, January 24, 2003 with Niña Amada Mía replacing it on Monday, January 27, 2003.

Erika Buenfil, Lourdes Munguía, Luz María Jerez, Leticia Perdigón and Gabriela Goldsmith starred as protagonists, while Maite Embil starred as main antagonist.

== Plot ==
Dalia, Rosa, Narda, Margarita, and Violeta are five longtime friends who formed a group called the "Club of the Flowers" during their teenage years, inspired by their flower-related names. The friends shared aspirations of marriage, family life, and maintaining their friendship into adulthood.

- Violeta Carmona: is the one who triggered this story and involuntarily cause "The Club of the Flowers" to meet again.
- Margarita Saavedra: had a great love of youth. As a teenager she was in love with a handsome boy named Ricardo. He also corresponded fully to her but Ricardo was from a very humble class.
- Dalia Marcelín: is an infinitely different woman from Margarita. Dalia was the typical class applied girl, who always appeared in the honor roll for her excellent grades.
- Rosa Corso: only member of the "Club of the Flowers" that continues married and happy, is at least what she believes. She met Armando when both attended high school.
- Narda Maria: the most liberal and the most fun of all. Narda has two divorces that have provided good dividends, thanks to her friend Dalia, who is her lawyer.
- Irene Molet: the only one who is not named after a flower, majored in Social Work, has a great sense of kindness, generosity and dedication to service.

== Cast ==
- Erika Buenfil as Dalia Marcelín Gutiérrez
- Lourdes Munguía as Irene Molet de Villaseñor
- Leticia Perdigón as Margarita Saavedra Cañada
- Luz María Jerez as Rosa Corso Rivas de Calderón
- Gabriela Goldsmith as Narda Mareca Amaya
- Cecilia Gabriela as Violeta Carmona Heredia
- Maite Embil as Florencia Linares Escudero
- Alexis Ayala as Diego Montejo
- Armando Araiza as Narciso Villaseñor
- Orlando Carrió as Armando Calderón
- Eduardo Liñán as Fernando Villaseñor
- Jorge Antolín as Julio Bolestáin
- Alejandra Meyer as Brígida Corcuera
- Carmelita González as Aunt Luvia
- Rosita Quintana as Carmina del Mar Vda. de Mareca
- Benito Castro as Roque Delfino
- Alfonso Iturralde as Alejandro
- Lorenzo de Rodas as Don Ramiro Sepúlveda
- Gerardo Quiroz as Raymundo Villaseñor
- Leonorilda Ochoa as Rita Díaz
- Luis Reynoso as Ricardo Olvera
- Ariane Pellicer as Elena Molet
- Joemy Blanco as Cecilia Calderón
- Andrés Puentes as Cristián Madrigal
- Susy-Lu Peña as Mercedes Sepúlveda
- Luis Mario Quiroz as Armando Calderón Jr.
- Germán Gutiérrez as Patricio Bolestáin
- Franco Gala as Roberto "Tito" Fernández
- César Évora as Luis Ávila
- Kelchie Arizmendi as Violeta (young)
- Estephanie de la Cruz as Dalia (young)
- Consuelo Mendiola as Irene (young)
- Gabriela Ferreira as Margarita (young)
- Silvia Beguerisse as Rosa (young)
- Silvia Ramírez as Narda (young)
- Silvia Eugenia Derbez as Carmina (young)
- Patricia Martínez as Caridad
- Humberto Herrera as Román
- Mónica Dossetti as Ivette Molina
- Hanny Sáenz as Estela
- Jaime Lozano as Sergio Salomón
- María Fernanda Rodríguez as ' Carmelita Sepúlveda
- Juan Ignacio Aranda as Carlos
- Arsenio Campos as Mariano Madrigal
- Jaime Herner as Osvaldo Carpio
- Belén Balmori as Annel Paulín
- Daniel Gauvry as Néstor Elorza
- Ginny Hoffman as Rocío
- Sara Monar as Beatriz de Carmona
- Yolanda Ciani as Marina
- Rosángela Balbó as Martha
- Ricardo Silva as Agustín
- Claudia Cervantes as Cleo
- Zully Moreno as Eliana Santos
- Shirley as Belinda
- César Castro as Samuel
- Eleazar Gómez as Arturo Calderón
- Sergio Jiménez as Theater's director
- Mariana Karr as Emilia
- Isabel Martínez "La Tarabilla" as Nicandra
- María Dolores Oliva as Tránsito
- Rafael Origel as Superman
- Adalberto Parra as Dr. Castro
- Manuel Sánchez as Kaliman
- Evelyn Solares as Tila
- Luis Xavier as Jorge
- Rocío Yaber as Amparo
