= Miguel Ángel Biaggio =

Mexican actor

- Born: Miguel Ángel Olivares Biaggio; September 3, 1976 (age 49); San Luis Potosí, SLP, Mexico
- Occupations: Actor and Singer

Miguel Ángel Olivares Biaggio (born September 3, 1976, in San Luis Potosí, San Luis Potosí), also known as Miguel Angel Biagio, Mike Biagio, Mike Biaggio, is a Mexican actor.

== Life ==
Biaggio made his acting debut in the 1996 telenovela El vuelo del águila and since then, has appeared in various other telenovelas. Among those, El juego de la vida, se Te Dou a Vida, Corazones al límite, La Madrastra, Contra viento y marea, Rebelde, Muchachitas como tu, Querida Enemiga, Un gancho al corazon, Zacatillo, un lugar en tu corazon , Amorcito Corazon and Qué bonito amor. Biaggio was also a member of the Mexican band Mercurio.
