= Amorcito corazón =

Mexican telenovela

- Genre: Telenovela; Romance comedy
- Created by: Valentina Párraga
- Written by: Carmen Sepúlveda; Luis Reynoso; Edwin Valencia; Lucero Suárez
- Directed by: Fernando Nesme; Felipe Najera; Claudia Elisa Aguilar
- Starring: Elizabeth Álvarez; Diego Olivera; Fabiola Campomanes
- Theme music composer: Pedro de Urdimalas; Manuel Esperón
- Opening theme: "Amorcito corazón" performed by Chayanne
- Country of origin: Mexico
- Original language: Spanish
- No. of episodes: 206

Production
- Executive producer: Lucero Suarez
- Producer: Ángel Villaverde
- Cinematography: Jesús Acuña; Víctor Soto
- Editors: Jorge Silva; V. Hugo F. Ordaz
- Camera setup: Multi-camera
- Running time: 41-44 minutes
- Production company: Televisa

Original release
- Network: Canal de las Estrellas
- Release: 29 August 2011 – 10 June 2012

Related
- Trapos íntimos (2002)

Amorcito corazón (English title: Darling Sweetheart) is a Mexican telenovela produced by Lucero Suárez for Televisa, and aired from 29 August 2011 to 10 June 2012. It is a remake of the Venezuelan telenovela Trapos íntimos, produced in 2002.

It stars Fabiola Campomanes, Elizabeth Álvarez, Diego Olivera as the main protagonists, while Grettell Valdéz, África Zavala, Daniel Arenas, Alejandro Ibarra and Ricardo Fastlicht appear as co-protagonists. Liz Vega and Miguel Ángel Biaggio are the main antagonists, with Mariana Karr, Silvia Mariscal and Macaria in supporting roles.

In the United States, Univision aired Amorcito Corazón from 30 May 2012 to 1 February 2013.

== Plot ==
Isabel Cordero is an unlucky in love architect who lost the love of her life, Rubén, when she was 18 years old because of her controlling father, Leopoldo, who left his wife to start a relationship with Isabel's godmother. For this reason, Isabel's mother, Sara, loses her mind for a while and is admitted to a psychiatric medical institution. Isabel believes that she is cursed. She thinks that every man who falls in love with her will suffer for it. She thinks she will never succeed in love and be happy until she meets Fernando Lobo.

Fernando Lobo is the manager of a construction company who after the death of his wife, Sofía, is committed to raising their three daughters. While on a working trip to Veracruz, he meets Doris with whom he starts a short-lived romance. After the project, he returns to the capital. Under somewhat funny circumstances, he meets Isabel, who is also his neighbor. Unknown to Fernando, Isabel is a friend of his three daughters. Doris, meanwhile, joins forces with Alfonso, Isabel's ex-boyfriend, to prevent the relationship between Isabel and Fernando.

Lucía, Fernando's younger sister, is about to finish her novitiate in the convent run by Sor Ernestina when she meets Willy, a gym instructor that, in turn, is a gigolo. Despite her convictions about her religious vocation, the emergence of Willy and his declaration of love will make Lucía hesitate. In addition, Beba is in love and obsessed with Willy, but all he wants is her money. Hortensia, Beba's best friend and mother-in-law of Fernando, wants to "open the eyes" of her friend.

Zoe, Isabel and Lucía's best friend, is a young woman dedicated to her home and her husband Álvaro, who is cheating on her with a man in his house. After this discovery, Zoe realizes that she never really fell in love with Álvaro or any other man and does not "get them". In a suicide attempt, she meets Cecilio. She begins to like Cecilo but later meets Felipe who will become her boyfriend and her husband and the father of her daughter. She is unaware that Cecilio and Felipe are friends and business partners.

Marisol, the eldest daughter of Fernando, is a rebellious teenager who is in constant conflict with her father but finds love with Juancho, a humble young man who is also a cousin of Willy. However, Barbara, Willy's sister, is also in love with him and will do everything possible to separate them.

A twist in the story happens when Manuela, Sofía's twin sister, returns and is obsessed with Fernando, her late sister's husband.

== Cast ==
- Elizabeth Álvarez as Isabel Cordero Valencia de Lobo
- Diego Olivera as Fernando Lobo Carvajal
- Fabiola Campomanes as Manuela Ballesteros Tres Palacios / Sofía Ballesteros Tres Palacios de Lobo'
- Mariana Karr as Beatificación "Beba" Vda. de Solís
- Silvia Mariscal as Sara Valencia de Cordero
- Macaria as Hortensia Tres Palacios Vda. de Ballesteros
- Alejandro Ibarra as Lic. Felipe Ferrer
- Grettell Valdéz as Zoe Guerrero de García de Ferrer
- África Zavala as Lucía Lobo Carvajal de Pinzón
- Gerardo Murguia as Jorge Solís
- Ricardo Fastlicht as Lic. Cecilio Monsalve
- Miguel Ángel Biaggio as Alfonso "Poncho" Armendáriz
- Liz Vega as Doris Montiel de Armendáriz
- Diego Amozurrutia as Juan Francisco "Juancho" Hernández
- Renata Notni as María Soledad "Marisol" Lobo Ballesteros
- Gaby Mellado as Bárbara Pinzón Hernández de Rossy
- Ricardo Margaleff as Ramón "Moncho"
- Eduardo Shacklett as Ricardo "Ricky" Pinzón Hernández
- Adanely Núñez as Adela
- Gloria Sierra as Ana
- Rosita Pelayo as Guillermina Alcaráz
- Alfonso Iturralde as Leopoldo Cordero Méndez
- Daniel Arenas as William "Willy Boy" Guillermo Pinzón Hernández
- Patricia Martínez as Eulalia "Lala" Hernández Vda. de Pinzón
- María Alicia Delgado as Susana "Susy"
- Rubén Cerda as Padre Benito Carvajal
- Pietro Vannucci as Álvaro García de Alba
- Bibelot Mansur as Yazmín
- Raquel Morell as Sor Ernestina
- Queta Lavat as Sor Pilar
- Thelma Dorantes as Irma
- Maite Valverde as Mayela
- Joana Brito as Minerva
- Polo Monarrez as Chicho
- Regina Tiscareño as María Fernanda "Marifer" Lobo Ballesteros
- Karol Sevilla as María Lucia "Marilú" Lobo Ballesteros
- Omar Isfel as Gabriel "Tuqueque"

=== Special participation ===
- Carmen Becerra as Sabrina Peñaralta
- Alejandro Nones as Rubén
- Christian de la Campa as Martín Corona

== Awards and nominations ==
Year	Award	Category	Recipient	Result
2012	30th TVyNovelas Awards	Best Co-star Actor	Alejandro Ibarra	Nominated
2012	30th TVyNovelas Awards	Best Young Lead Actress	Gaby Mellado	Nominated
2012	30th TVyNovelas Awards	Best Young Lead Actor	Diego Amozurrutia	Nominated
