= María Alicia Delgado =

Mexican actress and comedian (1949–2026)

- Born: March 17, 1949; Monterrey, Nuevo Leon, Mexico
- Died: November 4, 2026 (aged 77)
- Occupations: Actress; comedian
- Years active: 1982–2026

Maria Alicia Delgado (March 17, 1949 – November 4, 2026) was a Mexican actress and comedian who was best known as one of the two female regulars on Anabel. Delgado spent her entire television career with Televisa.

== Life and career ==
Maria Alicia Delgado was born in Monterrey, Nuevo Leon on March 17, 1949. For years Delgado performed in Monterrey and Oaxaca. It was not until the early 1980s, however, that a staffer with Televisa's Oaxaca affiliate discovered her. Delgado was brought to the attention of the producer Enrique Segoviano, who in 1982 cast her in an episode of Odisea Burbujas. This resulted in Delgado's relocation to Mexico City where she would frequently work with Segoviano. She was cast as Marilu in the children's television series El tesoro del saber in 1984, not knowing that her most successful collaboration with Segoviano would come by decade's end.

Delgado, along with Anabel Ferreira, would be the only cast members to stay with Anabel for its entire run. When the series premiered, Mario Bezares and Eugenio Derbez were the male cast members. By 1993 the two women were still there, but Derbez's roles were now filled by Carlos Ignacio and Luis Arcoraz IV who had replaced Bezares. Delgado's two best-known characters from this series were Yadhira Davilillo, a middle-aged mother in the Coralia sketches, and an elderly woman in several others. So identifiable was the latter role that Delgado reprised it several times.

Her elderly woman character also appeared on, among other series, Derbez en cuando and XHDRBZ under the name of Alz (in the "Alz y Heimer" sketches) and Cero en Conducta as Jorge's (Jorge Ortiz de Pinedo) grandmother. Originally Jorge's grandmother, in recurring appearances, would try to defend Jorge and his classmates from their teacher and principal; in later recurring appearances, she would retell stories, which were acted out by the series' regular cast. Delgado also guested on Festival del Humor and Humor es...los comediantes in her elderly woman characterization. Her appearance on the latter, telecast in 2000, was ironic as the series' regular Aida Pierce would also occasionally play an elderly woman in sketches.

Although Delgado was primarily a comedian, she also appeared in telenovelas, including Querida enemiga and, most recently, Amorcito Corazón.

She later appeared as Dora on the television series ¿Tu crees?, produced by Ortiz de Pinedo. For her contributions to television, Delgado's handprints were embedded in the Paseo de las Luminarias.

Delgado died on November 4, 2026, at the age of 77.
