= Sharis Cid =

Mexican actress

Sharis Cid (Maria Del Rosario Cid Perez)
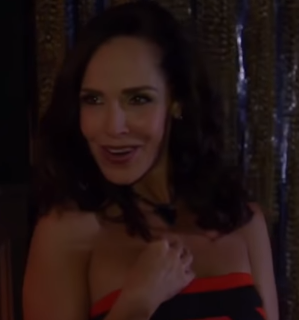
- Cid in 2019
- Born: September 5, 1972 (age 53); Chihuahua, Chih., Mexico
- Occupation: Actress

Sharis Cid (Born María del Rosario Cid Pérez, 5 September 1972 in Chihuahua, Chih., Mexico) is a Mexican actress who has participated in several telenovelas, such as DKDA, Salud, Dinero y Amor and La Intrusa. She was also a singer in Roll and DKDA.

Sharis's husband was murdered.

Sharis appeared in Big Brother VIP, third season. She has two younger brothers, Sergio and Ricardo. They all live in Mexico. Sharis was in a play in Mexico City with Jorge Ortiz de Pineda.

== Notes ==
- Other sources cite Cid's birth year as 1973.
- Her professional name was inspired by that of Hollywood musical star Cyd Charisse.
