= 17th TVyNovelas Awards =

1999 Mexican TV awards

- Date: March 28, 1999
- Location: Mexico D.F.
- Hosted by: Daniela Romo & Marco Antonio Regil

Highlights
- Most awards: El privilegio de amar (12)
- Most nominations: El privilegio de amar (13)

Television/radio coverage
- Network: Canal de las Estrellas

The 17th TVyNovelas Awards were an academy of special awards to the best soap operas and TV shows. The awards ceremony took place on March 28, 1999 in Mexico D.F. The ceremony was televised in Mexico by Canal de las Estrellas.

Daniela Romo and Marco Antonio Regil hosted the show. El privilegio de amar won 12 awards, the most for the evening, including Best Telenovela. Other winners La mentira won four awards and La usurpadora, Mi pequeña traviesa, Preciosa and Soñadoras won one each.

== Summary of awards and nominations ==
Telenovela	Nominations	Awards
El privilegio de amar	13	12
La mentira	12	4
La usurpadora	9	1
Preciosa	3	1
Soñadoras	3	1
Vivo por Elena	2	0
Mi pequeña traviesa	1	1
Camila	1	0

== Winners and nominees ==
=== Telenovelas ===
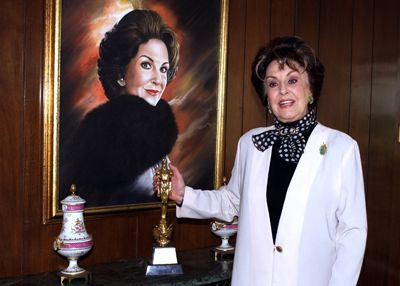
Marga López, winner for Best Leading Actress.

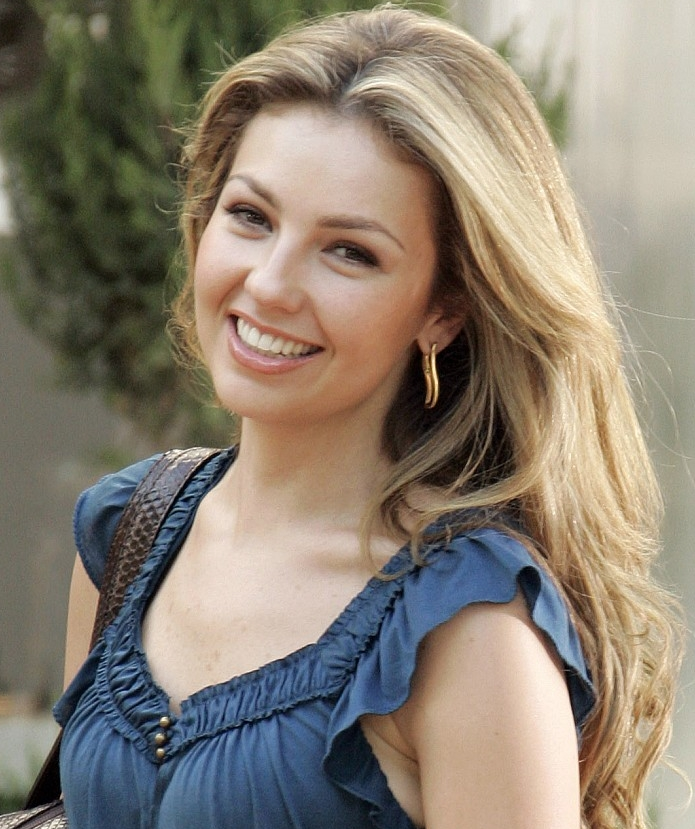
Thalía, awarded with a Special Award as International Artist.

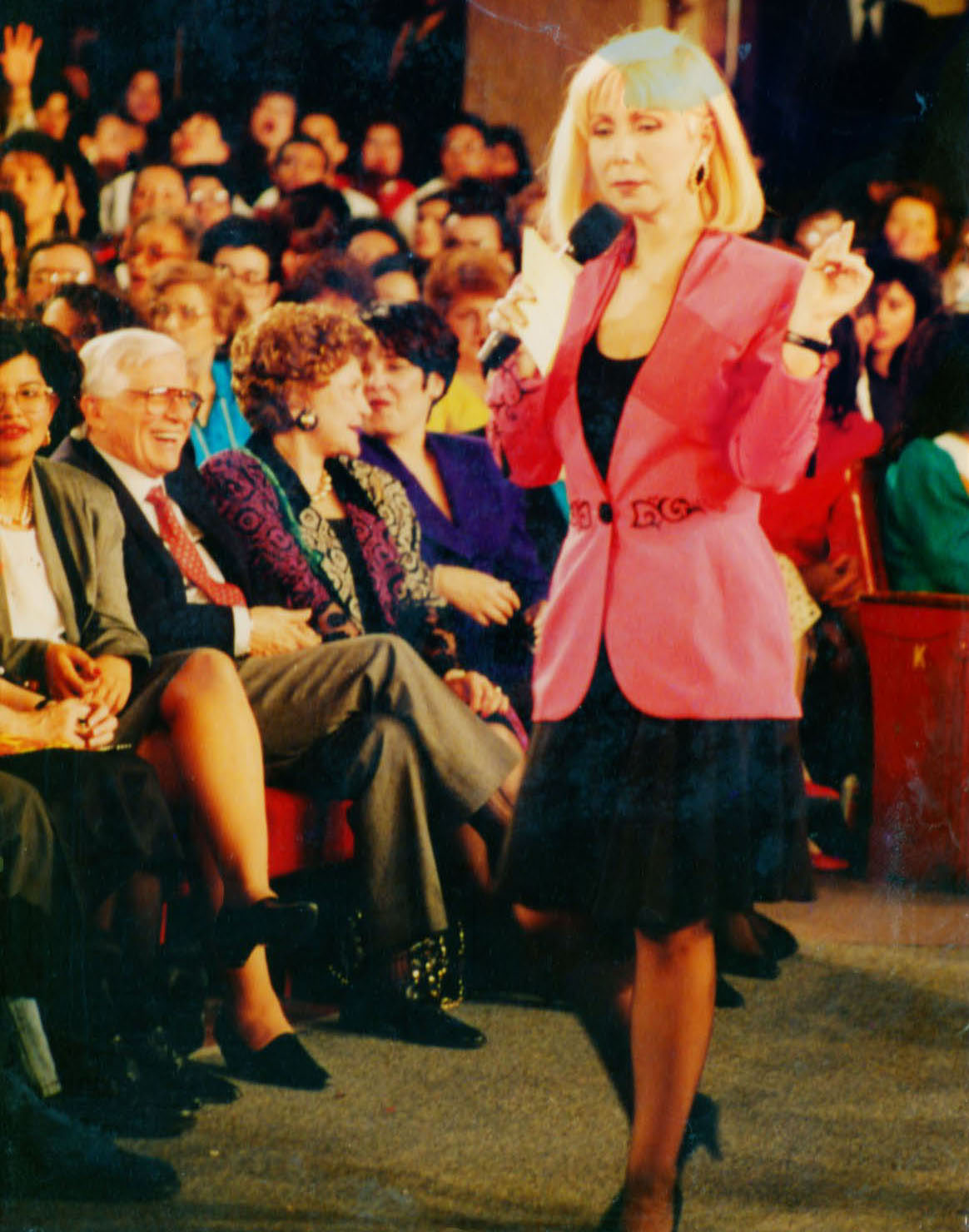
Cristina Saralegui, awarded with a Special Recognition for 10 years of Continued Success.

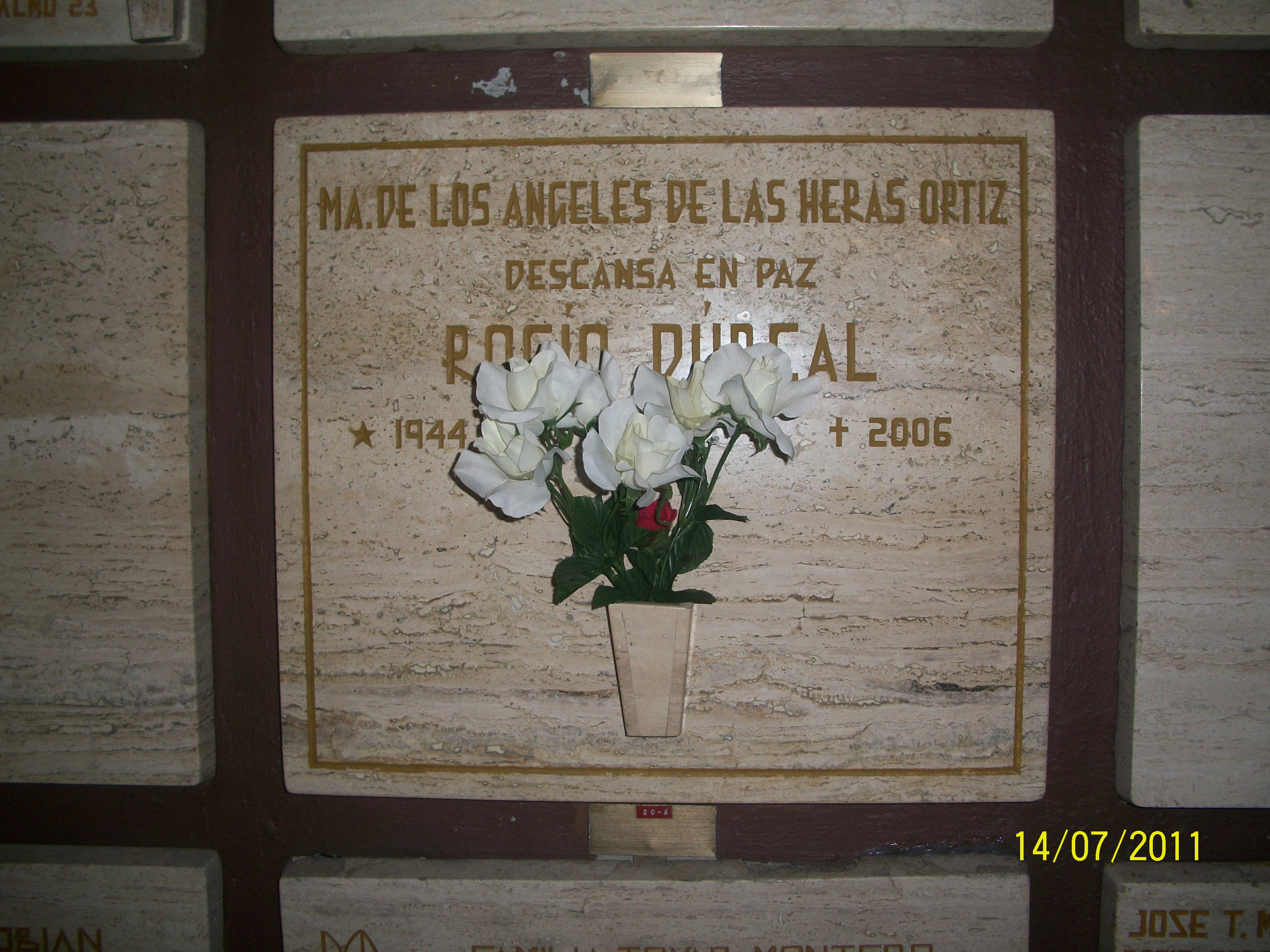
Crypt of Rocío Dúrcal, awarded with a Special Award for International Projection in Music.

Best Telenovela	Best Original Story or Adaptation
El privilegio de amar; La mentira; La usurpadora	Nora Alemán – La mentira
Best Actress	Best Actor
Helena Rojo – El privilegio de amar; Gabriela Spanic – La usurpadora; Victoria Ruffo – Vivo por Elena	Andrés García – El privilegio de amar; Fernando Colunga – La usurpadora; Guy Ecker – La mentira
Best Antagonist Actress	Best Antagonist Actor
Cynthia Klitbo – El privilegio de amar; Gabriela Spanic – La usurpadora; Karla Álvarez – La mentira	Enrique Rocha – El privilegio de amar; Juan Pablo Gamboa – La usurpadora; Luis Gatica – La mentira
Best Leading Actress	Best Leading Actor
Marga López – El privilegio de amar; Libertad Lamarque – La usurpadora; Rosa María Bianchi – La mentira	José Carlos Ruiz – Soñadoras; Enrique Lizalde – Camila; Eric del Castillo – La mentira
Best Supporting Actress	Best Supporting Actor
Carmen Salinas – Preciosa; Cecilia Gabriela – Vivo por Elena; Chantal Andere – La usurpadora	César Évora – El privilegio de amar; Marcelo Buquet – La usurpadora; Sergio Basáñez – La mentira
Best Young Lead Actress	Best Young Lead Actor
Adela Noriega – El privilegio de amar; Irán Castillo – Preciosa; Kate del Castillo – La mentira	Guy Ecker – La mentira; Mauricio Islas – Preciosa; René Strickler – El privilegio de amar
Best Revelation	Best Debut Actress
Sabine Moussier – El privilegio de amar; Aracely Arámbula – Soñadoras; Arath de la Torre – Soñadoras	Michelle Vieth – Mi pequeña traviesa

=== Others ===
Best Musical Theme	Best Musical Theme Composer
"El privilegio de amar" — Mijares and Lucero – El privilegio de amar	Jorge Avendaño — "El privilegio de amar" – El privilegio de amar
Best Direction	Best Direction of the Cameras
Miguel Córcega and Mónica Miguel – El privilegio de amar	Jesús Nájera Saro and Manuel Barajas – La usurpadora
Best Art Design	Best Decor
Rocío Vélez – La mentira	Rosalba Santoyo – La mentira
Best Comedic Performance	Youth Band of the Year
Eugenio Derbez – Derbez en cuando	Mercurio

=== Special awards ===
- Award for Career: Elsa Aguirre
- Award for Career: Gaspar Henaine "Capulina"
- 20 Years of Career: Lucero
- International Artist: Thalía
- International Projection in Music: Rocío Dúrcal
- Most Successful Children's Musical Phenomenon of the Decade: Tatiana
- Best Television Production: Miguel Ángel Herros for Coverage of Pope John Paul II's Visit to Mexico
- Excellence in Transmission of Generational Encounter with the Pope: Luis de Llano Macedo and Marco Flavio Cruz
- Recognition for 10 Years of Continued Success: Cristina Saralegui for El Show de Cristina

=== Commercial Awards ===
- Most Beautiful Figure: Michelle Vieth awarded for Jeans Oggi

=== Absent ===
People who did not attend the ceremony and were nominated in the shortlist in each category:

- Luis de Llano Macedo
- Marga López (Her son, Carlos Amador Jr., received the award in her place)
- Tatiana
