= Edith González =

Mexican actress (1964–2019)

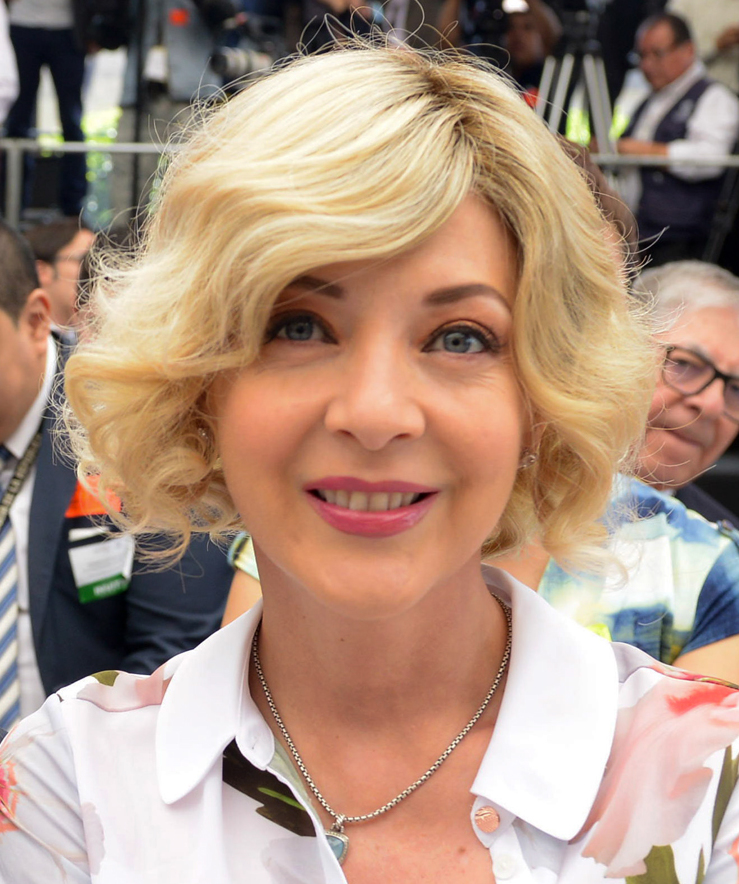
- González in September 2018
- Born: Edith González Fuentes; 10 December 1964; Mexico City, Mexico
- Died: 13 June 2019 (aged 54); Huixquilucan, State of Mexico, Mexico
- Burial place: Gayosso Memorial Park, Naucalpan de Juárez
- Occupation: Actress
- Years active: 1970–2019
- Spouse: Lorenzo Lazo (m. 2010)
- Children: 1

Edith González Fuentes (Spanish pronunciation: [eˈðit gonˈsales]; 10 December 1964 – 13 June 2019) was a Mexican actress. She is best remembered for working on multiple telenovelas produced by three different multimedia companies, which included Televisa, TV Azteca and Telemundo. Her appearances in Mexican horror films made her a scream queen, with notable titles such as: Alucarda, la hija de las tinieblas (1977), Cyclone (1978), Trampa Infernal (1989) and El descuartizador (1991).

In 1970, she made her acting debut as a child actress in the telenovela Cosa juzgada. She would later start a prominent career on multiple telenovelas produced by Televisa, with her most famous works including Los ricos también lloran (1979–1980), Bianca Vidal (1982–1983), Corazón salvaje (1993–1994), Salomé (2001–2002), Mundo de fieras (2006–2007), Palabra de mujer (2007–2008) and Camaleones (2009–2010). In 2011, she moved to TV Azteca, the second best-known multimedia company in Mexico, where she starred in the telenovelas Cielo rojo (2011–2012), Vivir a destiempo (2013) and Las Bravo (2014–2015).

She also starred in the telenovelas produced by Telemundo Doña Bárbara (2008–2009) and Eva la Trailera in 2016, with the latter being her last leading acting role. Her last televised work was in 2019 as judge on the fashion program produced by TV Azteca, Este es mi estilo.

In film, she made her debut in the television film Un cuento de Navidad (1974). Her most famous film works included Salón México (1996), Señorita Justice (2004), Poquita Ropa (2011) and Deseo (2013).

As well as being actress of television and films, she also participated on plays such as Aventurera (theatrical adaptation of the film with the same name) produced by Carmen Salinas. For her work as an actress in films and telenovelas, she was nominated and awarded with prizes such as the Diosas de Plata and Heraldo de México.

== Life and career ==
=== 1964–1981: Childhood and child actress ===
González was born on 10 December 1964 in Mexico City. Edith was discovered in a mall when both her and her mother went to buy shoes by a man who worked for Televisa, they urgently needed a beautiful girl with blonde hair and blue eyes - her mother accepted the offer and Edith with the help of her parents embarked in the Mexican Film Industry. She participated in school plays since her childhood and studied acting in New York, London and Paris. She was part of the academy of theater director Lee Strasberg, as well as studying at the Neighborhood Playhouse and the Actors Institute. González was also part of the Sorbonne University, where she studied English and art history, and jazz in Great Britain. Aged 5 and during a visit to the Siempre en Domingo program, she was chosen by the public to play a role with actor Rafael Baledón. From then on she appeared as a child actress in several films and TV series from the 70s. According to IMDb, her first acting credit role was on the 1970 telenovela produced by Televisa, Cosa juzgada. Her early papers on telenovelas included on Lucía Sombra (1971), La maldición de la blonda (1971), El amor tiene cara de mujer (1971), El edificio de enfrente (1972), Mi primer amor (1973), Los miserables (1973), for which she was awarded in 1974 with an Heraldo award in the category of "revelation artist" and Lo imperdonable (1975).

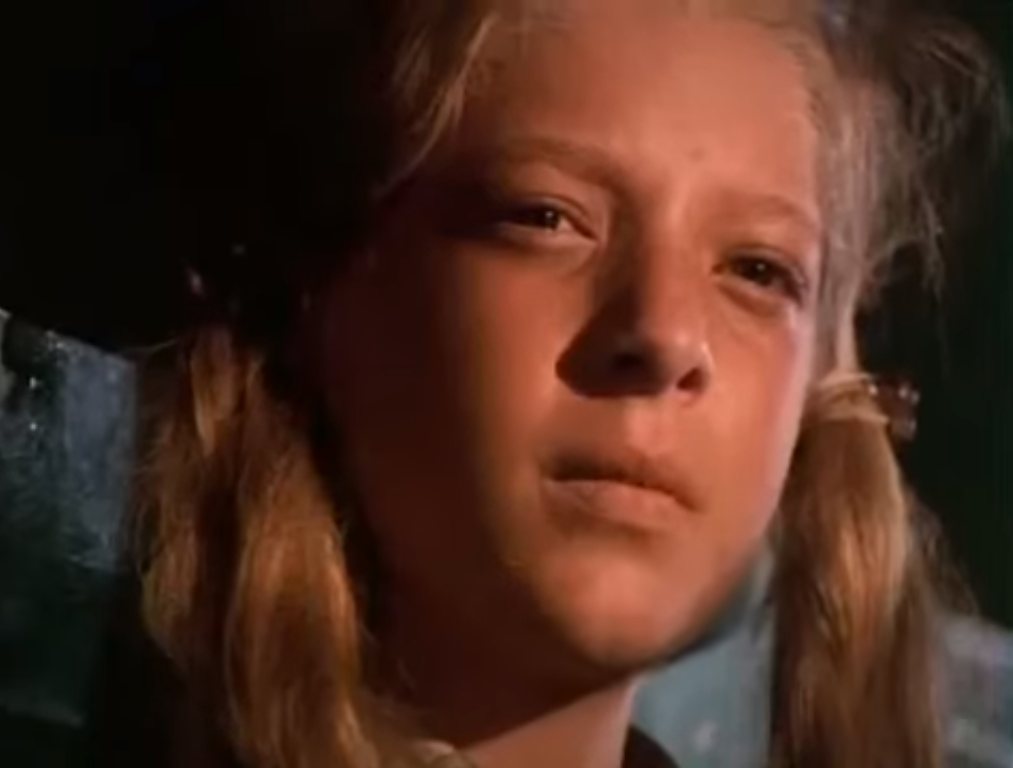
González in Cyclone (1978)

She made her film debut in 1974 in the television film Canción de Navidad. Following this, some of her early films included El rey de los gorilas (1977), Alucarda, la hija de las tinieblas (1977), Cyclone (1978), Guyana: Crime of the Century (1979), Fabricantes de pánico (1980) and Cosa fácil (1982).

González would continue working in multiple telenovelas produced by Televisa. At the age of 15, she had her first important role in television participating on the telenovela Los ricos también lloran of 1979 sharing credits with Verónica Castro and Rogelio Guerra, and in which she also met and acted along Christian Bach with whom she had a longtime friendship until Bach's death. As a teenager, her works in telenovelas included Ambición (1980), Soledad (1980), in which she shared credits with Libertad Lamarque and El hogar que yo robé (1981), in which she shared credits with Angélica María.

=== 1982–1989: Transition to adult roles ===
In 1982, González had her first leading role in the telenovela Bianca Vidaland the same year she also appeared in the telenovela Chispita. The next year in 1983, she participated in the telenovela La fiera. In 1984, she appeared in the film Adiós Lagunilla, adiós and had another leading role in the telenovela Sí, mi amor. In 1986, she appeared in the anthology series La hora marcada as well as appearing in the telenovelas Monte Calvario, in which she had the leading role and Lista negra.

In 1987 she made an appearance as herself on the program Papá soltero and had her first villain role in the telenovela Rosa salvaje, she participated in this project until episode 48 and at the time several versions for her exit were woven. It was said that she had been fired, but in the words of González herself, she actually resigned because of the alleged mistreatment she received from the production of the series. Her character was replaced by Felicia Mercado. In 1988 she participated in the films Pero sigo siendo el rey and Central camionera while she also returned to the telenovelas in Flor y canela. She acted on the horror film Trampa Infernal (1989), sharing credits with Pedro Fernández.

=== 1990–2009: High-profile actress in Televisa ===
In 1990, González was part of the films El motel de la muerte, Sentencia de muerte and Atrapados. This same year, she had the leading role on the telenovela En carne propia. Her filmography continued in 1991 with the films El muerto, El jugador and El descuartizador. In 1993, she starred on the telenovela Corazón salvaje along with Eduardo Palomo, who died in 2003 due to a heart attack. This same year, she appeared on the episode "La heredera" (Spanish for, "The heiress") of the program Videoteatros: Véngan corriendo que les tengo un muerto as well as appearing on the program Televiteatros. She appeared on the film Los cómplices del infierno (1995), in which she shared credits with Maribel Guardia and Alfredo Adame. In 1995 and 1996 and under various roles, González made appearances for the anthology telenovela Mujer, Casos de la Vida Real, hosted by Golden Age of Mexican cinema actress, Silvia Pinal. In 1996, she had the lead role on the telenovela La sombra del otro. She also appeared on the film Salón México (1996). In 1997, she had another leading role on the telenovela La jaula de oro, sharing credits with Saúl Lisazo and René Casados.

From August 1997 to the Spring of 1999, González participated on the play Aventurera produced by actress Carmen Salinas, this was the play depiction of the 1950 film of the same name. On the play she had the leading role and was the first to portrayed Elena Tejero (the main character), as well as being recognized by Salinas, the producer, as the best "Aventurera" for the play, even though after González, there were other portrayers for the leading role, such as Niurka Marcos, Ninel Conde, Susana González, among other more actresses. In 1999, she had the leading role in the telenovela Nunca te olvidaré, sharing credits with actor Fernando Colunga and also had a role on the telenovela Cuento de Navidad.

Returning to films in 2000, she took part on the short film Rogelio. In 2001, she had the leading role on the telenovela Salomé, sharing credits with María Rubio, Guy Ecker and Niurka Marcos. In 2002, she appeared on the comedy program XHDRbZ. In 2003, she made a special appearance on the program La hora pico. In 2004, she starred in the telenovela Mujer de madera, by producer Emilio Larrosa, but had to stop working that same year due to becoming pregnant. She was replaced by Ana Patricia Rojo in the production. Her next film role was in the movie Señorita Justice (2004), a rare English-language role in which she shared credits with Eva Longoria which was filmed on location in Miami, Florida. Returning to telenovelas in 2006, she took an antagonist role in the telenovela Mundo de fieras, of producer Salvador Mejía, where she shared credits with César Évora and Gaby Espino. This same year, she had another guest appearance on the program La hora pico. In 2007, she had a guest role on the black comedy program La familia P. Luche, in which she shared credits with Eugenio Derbez and Consuelo Duval. This same year, she had another leading role in the telenovela Palabra de mujer and also traveled to Romania for an acting role in the telenovela Inimă de țigan. In 2008, she traveled to Colombia to play the role of Bárbara Guaimarán in Doña Bárbara, based on the Venezuelan novel of the same name written by Rómulo Gallegos, acting alongside Christian Meier and produced by Telemundo. And this same year, she also made an appearance on a Plaza Sesamo short film entitled Plaza Sésamo: Los monstruos feos más bellos (Sesame Square: The most beautiful ugly monsters). In 2009, she appeared with a role on the psychological thriller series Mujeres asesinas and this same year, she also had a co-leading role on the telenovela Camaleones, with this marking her last telenovela on the channel.

=== 2010–2019: TV Azteca and final works ===
In 2010, González switched to TV Azteca, the second main Mexican broadcaster. She made her first appearance for the company during a program of the 2010 edition of la Academia La Academia Bicentenario. This same year, she appeared during the Mañanitas a la Virgen program, a special yearly transmission done by TV Azteca on December 12, in which different artists sing at the Basilica of Our Lady of Guadalupe in honor of Our Lady of Guadalupe celebration day.

In 2011, she had her first leading role for the company on the telenovela Cielo rojo by Eric Vonn, sharing credits with Regina Torné and Mauricio Islas. She also returned to films on the television film Poquita ropa (2011), starred by singer Ricardo Arjona. This same year, she also had a special role on the telenovela A corazón abierto and led the Mañanitas a la Virgen program. In 2013, she had another leading role on the telenovela Vivir a destiempo, in which she shared credits with Humberto Zurita. This year, she also co-produced and acted in the film Deseo along with her longtime friend Christian Bach. In 2014, she had the leading role on the telenovela Las Bravo, in which she shared credits one more time with actor Mauricio Islas.

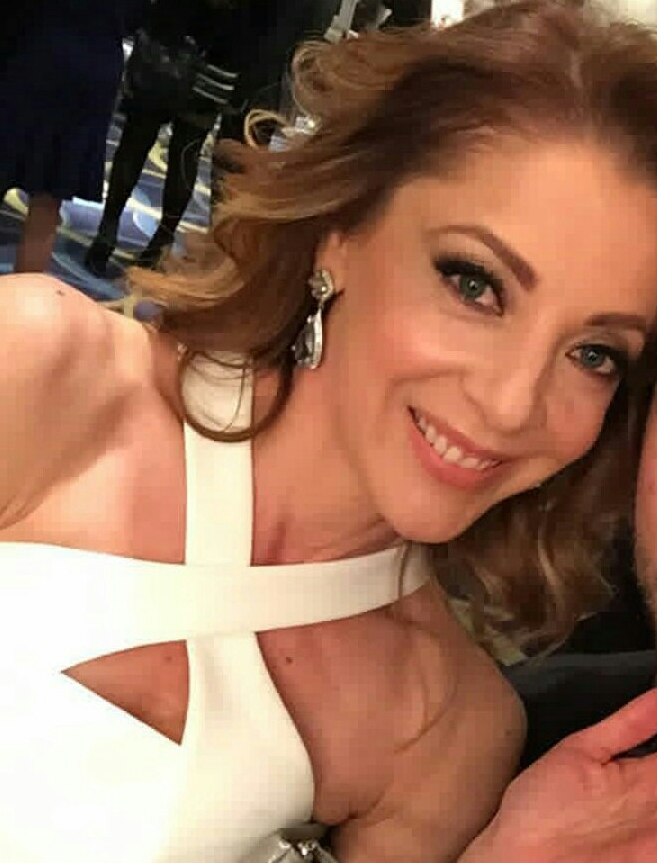
González in 2016

In 2016, she returned with the leading role on the telenovela produced by Telemundo, Eva la trailera. The telenovela and Telemundo were sued by Rolando Fernández, who accused them of plagiarism of his 1983 film Lola the Truck Driver. The lawsuit was ultimately won by Fernández. Despite this, the telenovela was retransmitted by Telemundo in 2019 following González's death as a tribute in her memory.

In 2017, she played a recurring role on the telenovela 3 familias, and appeared on the annual Mañanitas a la Virgen program. In 2019, González filmed her last film entitled Un sentimiento honesto en el calabozo del olvido, and served as a judge on the first season of fashion reality show Este es mi Estilo, with this being her last work and final television project.

== Theater ==
As well as being an actress for multiple films and television productions, González was also an actress of multiple plays such as Los árboles mueren de pie, Un día particular, Magnolias de acero, Buenas noches mamá, Entre mujeres, among others. Her most famous theater work was in the play Aventurera produced by Carmen Salinas for which she was the first actress to portray the lead character, Elena Tejero.

== Personal life ==
González had a daughter, Constanza (born 17 August 2004). Initially she did not disclose the father's name and decided to raise Constanza alone. In 2008, Mexican politician Santiago Creel acknowledged that he was Constanza's father. During an interview in August 2012, González shared that she had lost a baby previously without any further explanation by simply stating the following:

I lost one. So sorry. That is something I can tell you that it is a test not passed. It's something that hurts and it will hurt.

In 2010, González married Lorenzo Lazo Margáin. She was longtime friends with Argentine-Mexican actress Christian Bach, who died on February 26, 2019, due to respiratory failure. As an actress in TV Azteca, she was noted for being averse to doing bed scenes, asking for a body double to replace her in sex scenes.

== Illness and death ==
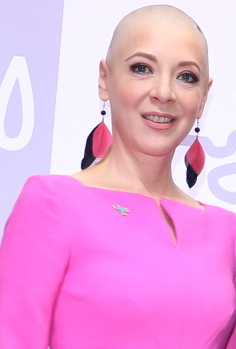
González sporting her hair loss as a result of her cancer, during a conference on World Ovarian Cancer Day in Mexico City in May 2017

In 2016, González was diagnosed with stage IV ovarian cancer. She underwent surgery to have her ovaries, uterus and lymph nodes removed, and, in the words of the actress herself, she had overcome the cancer. In April 2019, it was rumored that she had suffered a cancer relapse; which the actress denied, adducing a trip to Guatemala.

On 13 June 2019, González died of the disease. She was declared medically brain dead and was later taken off life support by her family at noon, dying at the age of 54. Hours before her death the Mexican television daily morning program Hoy erroneously reported that she had already died, which was wrong since González's official hour of death was at 12:00 p.m. when her family decided to disconnect her, with this incident causing annoyance to her family. Also on 13 June, González's funeral was held at the Panteón Francés where she was accompanied by her family and famous colleagues of her acting career.

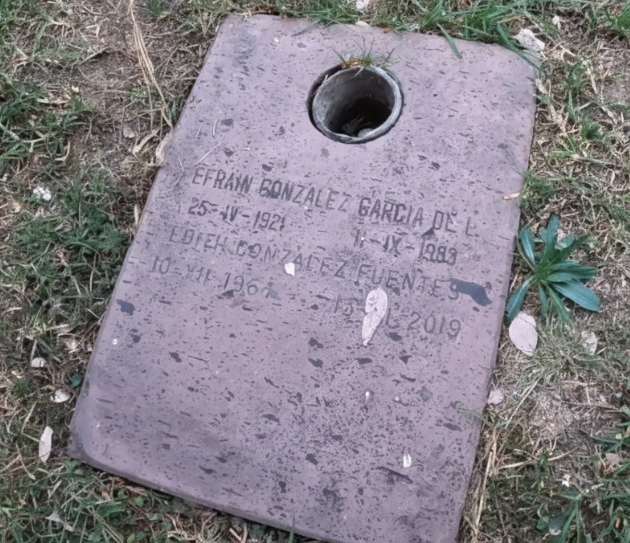
Grave of Edith González in 2025, inside the Parque Memorial Gayosso cemetery

On 14 June, her body was moved to the Jorge Negrete theatre where a tribute was held for her with the attendance of fans, friends and family. After the tribute, she was moved to the Parque Memorial Gayosso in Naucalpan de Juárez, where she was buried alongside her father.

== Filmography ==
=== Film ===
Year	Title	Role	Notes
1974	Canción de Navidad	Fanny, sister of Scrooge	Film debut / Television film
1977	Alucarda, la hija de las tinieblas	Village Girl	Uncredited
1977	El rey de los gorilas	Betty	
1978	Cyclone	Tiersa	
1979	Guyana: Crime of the Century	Commune member	
1980	Fabricantes de pánico	Jéssica	
1982	Cosa fácil	Elena's Friend	Uncredited
1984	Adiós Lagunilla, adiós	Mariela	
1988	Pero sigo siendo el rey	Laura	
1988	Central camionera		
1989	Trampa Infernal	Alejandra	
1990	El motel de la muerte		Television film
1990	Sentencia de muerte		
1990	Atrapados	Flor	
1991	El muerto		
1991	El jugador	Romy	
1991	El descuartizador	Dr. Verónica Arizméndi	
1995	Los cómplices del infierno	Sandra	
1996	Salón México	La Jaibita	
1998	Las noches de aventurera	Elena Tejeda / Herself	Television film
2000	Rogelio		Short film
2004	Señorita Justice	Detective Christine Garcia	English-language role
2008	Plaza Sésamo: Los monstruos feos más bellos	Herself	
2011	Poquita ropa		Television film
2011	Ricardo Arjona		Music video
2013	Deseo	Actriz	Associate producer
2017	Un sentimiento honesto en el calabozo del olvido	Isabelle Batun	

=== Telenovelas ===
Year	Title	Role	Notes
1970	Cosa juzgada		Television debut
1971	Lucía Sombra	Erika as a Child	
1971	La maldición de la blonda		
1971	El amor tiene cara de mujer		
1972	El edificio de enfrente	Martha	
1973	Mi primer amor	Lucía	
1973	Los miserables	Cosette as a Child	
1975	Lo imperdonable	Gloria as a Child	
1979	Los ricos también lloran	Marisabel	
1980	Ambición	Charito	
1980	Soledad	Luisita Sánchez Fuentes	
1981	El hogar que yo robé	Paulina	
1982	Bianca Vidal	Bianca Vidal	Lead role
1982	Chispita		
1983	La fiera	Julie	
1984	Sí, mi amor	Susana	Lead role
1986	Monte Calvario	Ana Rosa	Lead role
1986	Lista negra	Mary	
1987	Rosa salvaje	Leonela Villarreal #1	Antagonist
1988	Flor y canela	Florentina	
1990	En carne propia	Estefanía Muriel / Natalia de Jesús Ortega	Lead role
1993	Corazón salvaje	Mónica de Altamira	Lead role
1996	La sombra del otro	Lorna Madrigal	Lead role
1997	La jaula de oro	Oriana / Carolina	Lead role
1999	Nunca te olvidaré	Esperanza Gamboa Martel / Isabel Clara Martel	Lead role
1999	Cuento de Navidad	Josefina Coder	
2001	Salomé	Fernanda "Salomé" Quiñónez Lavalle	Lead role
2004	Mujer de madera	Marisa Santibáñez Villalpando	Lead role
2006	Mundo de fieras	Joselyn Rivas del Castillo Arizmendi de Cervantes-Bravo	Main Antagonist
2007	Palabra de mujer	Vanessa Noriega	Lead role
2007	Inimă de țigan	Diana de Aragón	Romanian telenovela
2008	Doña Bárbara	Doña Bárbara Guaimarán	Lead role
2009	Camaleones	Francisca Campos	Co-lead role
2011	Cielo rojo	Alma Durán de Molina	Lead role
2011	A corazón abierto	Andrea Carranti	Special participation
2013	Vivir a destiempo	Paula Duarte de Bermúdez	Lead role
2014	Las Bravo	Valentina Díaz de Bravo	Lead role
2016	Eva la trailera	Eva Soler	Lead role
2017, 2018	3 familias	Katy	Recurring role

=== Television ===
Year	Title	Role	Notes
1986	La hora marcada		
1987	Papá soltero	Actriz Invitada	1 episode
1993	Videoteatros: Véngan corriendo que les tengo un muerto		Episode: "La heredera"
1993	Televiteatros	Leomela Villarreal	
1995, 1996	Mujer, Casos de la Vida Real	Various roles	2 episodes
2002	XHDRbZ	Chulieta	
2003	La hora pico	Edith / Niña Salomé / Clienta enojada	
2006	La hora pico	Edith Adventure	
2007	La familia P. Luche	María Josefina	
2009	Mujeres asesinas	Clara Soler	"Clara, fantasiosa" (Season 2, Episode 1)
2010	La Academia Bicentenario	Herself	
2010	Mañanitas a la Virgen	Herself	
2011	Mañanitas a la Virgen	Herself	
2017	Mañanitas a la Virgen	Herself	
2019	Este es mi estilo	Herself	Judge

== Awards and nominations ==
=== Diosas de Plata awards ===
Year	Category	Nominated work	Result
2014	Best actress	Deseo	Nominated

=== Heraldo de México awards ===
Year	Category	Nominated work	Result
1974	Revelation Artist	Los miserables	Won

=== People en Español awards ===
Year	Category	Nominated work	Result
2009	Best actress	Doña Bárbara	Won
2009	Best couple (with Christian Meier)	Doña Bárbara	Nominated
2010	Best TV Series Performance	Mujeres Asesinas 2	Won

=== TVyNovelas awards ===
Year	Category	Nominated work	Result
1994	TVyNovelas Award for Best Actress	Corazón salvaje	Won
2000	TVyNovelas Award for Best Actress	Nunca te olvidare	Nominated
2002	TVyNovelas Award for Best Actress	Salomé	Nominated
2005	TVyNovelas Award for Best Actress	Mujer de madera	Nominated
2007	TVyNovelas Award for Best Antagonist Actress	Mundo de fieras	Won
2007	Special award to the public's favorite star		Won
