= Acapulco, cuerpo y alma =

Mexican telenovela

- Genre: Telenovela
- Created by: María Zarattini
- Written by: Eric Vonn; Valeria Phillips
- Directed by: Juan Carlos Muñoz
- Starring: Patricia Manterola; Saúl Lisazo; Guillermo García Cantú; Chantal Andere
- Theme music composer: Carlos Páramo
- Opening theme: "Cuerpo y alma" by Patricia Manterola
- Ending theme: "Búscale el modo" by Patricia Manterola, Marcelo Cezán and Chantal Andere
- Country of origin: Mexico
- Original language: Spanish
- No. of episodes: 80

Production
- Executive producer: José Alberto Castro
- Production locations: Acapulco, Guerrero
- Cinematography: Fernando Chacón
- Editor: Héctor Márquez
- Camera setup: Multi-camera

Original release
- Network: Canal de las Estrellas
- Release: September 4, 1995 – April 12, 1996

Related
- Tú o nadie (1985); Sortilegio (2009); Cabo (2022)

Acapulco, cuerpo y alma (English: Acapulco, Body and Soul), is a Mexican telenovela produced by José Alberto Castro in 1995 for Televisa. It is a remake of the Mexican telenovela produced by Televisa in 1985, Tú o nadie.

Patricia Manterola and Saúl Lisazo star as the main protagonists, while Guillermo García Cantú and Chantal Andere star as the main antagonists.

== Plot ==
David Montalvo is a businessman and he has very good relations with his stepmother Elena and his sister Cinthia, but he doesn't have good relations with Elena’s son Marcelo, from her previous marriage.

Marcelo deeply envies and hates David and gradually plans to snatch his wealth and power. In Zihuatanejo, Marcelo meets Lorena Garcia, a waitress at a seaside bar, courting her as David Montalvo until she falls in love with him. A few months later, they marry and then Marcelo and his henchman, German, sabotages a plane David and his associates are travelling in, causing it to crash.

Marcelo confesses the truth to Lorena, forcing her to be his accomplice, because as Lorena believed to be David's widow, she is his sole heir. Marcelo will then inherit David's entire fortune when he married Lorena. However, David survives and returns but is made to believe he has partial amnesia, when he fails to recognise his 'wife'. Slowly falling in love with David, Lorena breaks down and tells him the truth one night during a walk on the beach. David, already in love with Lorena, accepts her as his wife, much to Marcelo's rage. Helped by David's vengeful ex-girlfriend Aide, he sets out to drive the couple apart.

== Cast ==
- Patricia Manterola as Lorena García
- Saúl Lisazo as David Montalvo
- Guillermo García Cantú as Marcelo de Maris
- Chantal Andere as Aide San Román
- Karla Álvarez as Julia García
- Elsa Aguirre as Doña Ana Elena de Montalvo
- Cecilia Gabriela as Cynthia Montalvo
- Patricia Navidad as Clara
- Fernando Balzaretti as Aurelio García
- Manuel "Flaco" Ibáñez as Teodoro
- Rosángela Balbó as Claudia de San Román
- Leticia Perdigón as Rita
- Adriana Lavat as Liliana San Román
- Tomás Goros as Germán
- Germán Gutiérrez as Pablo
- Eduardo Rivera as Óscar Rodríguez
- Julio Urreta as Rosendo
- Lucha Moreno as Cleo
- Julio Vega as Félix
- Marcelo Cezán as Enrique
- Sofía Vergara as Irasema
- Juan Soler as Humberto Bautista
- Dalilah Polanco as Juana Dorantes
- Germán Bernal as Raúl
- Zamorita as Goyo
- Rosita Bouchot as Dora
- Edi Xol as Arturo Durand
- Alfredo Leal as Ricardo de Maris
- Bodokito as Mariela
- Claudia Vega as Marina
- Kala as Ronaldo Torres
- Alejandra Espejo as Elvira Torres
- Andrea Noli as Sandra
- Lucero Reynoso as Marta
- Fernanda Ruizos as Mauricia
- Jeanette Candiani as Yulissa
- Mario Cimarro as Ali
- Julio Mannino as Alex
- Adela Ayensa as Vogue
- Ana María de la Torre as Sayli
- Aracely Arámbula

Jorge Auxaras es Gamaliel
