= Historia de un Amor =

Historia de un Amor may refer to:

- Historia de un Amor (song), a song written by Carlos Eleta Almarán
- Historia de un amor (TV series), a Mexican telenovela
- Historia de un Amor (film), a 1955 film
