= Ambición =

Ambición may refer to:

- Ambition (1939 film), a 1939 Argentine film
- Ambición (TV series), a 1980 Mexican telenovela
