= Cyclone (1978 film) =

- Theatrical poster
- Spanish: El Ciclón
- Directed by: René Cardona Jr.
- Written by: René Cardona Jr. Carlos Valdemar
- Starring: Arthur Kennedy; Carroll Baker; Lionel Stander; Andrés García; Hugo Stiglitz; Mario Almada; Olga Karlatos
- Cinematography: León Sánchez
- Edited by: Alfredo Rosas Priego
- Music by: Riz Ortolani
- Distributed by: CONACINE (Mexico); Helvetia Films (Italy)
- Release dates: July 21, 1978 (West Germany & Italy); October 26, 1978 (Mexico)
- Running time: 114 minutes 97 minutes (cut version)
- Countries: Mexico; Italy

Cyclone (Spanish: El Ciclón; also known as Terror Storm) is a 1978 survival horror film co-written and directed by René Cardona Jr., and starring Arthur Kennedy, Carroll Baker, Lionel Stander, Andrés García, Hugo Stiglitz, Mario Almada and Olga Karlatos. The plot follows a group of passengers from a crashed airplane who find refuge on a small tour boat in the ocean, and who eventually resort to cannibalism for survival. The film is purportedly based in part on Alfred Hitchcock's Lifeboat (1944).

== Plot ==
The Caribbean Sea. The local authorities receive reports about an approaching cyclone and issue a general alert, but a small passenger plane, a tour boat and a fishing trawler fail to receive - or heed - the warning and are caught in the storm. The fishing vessel springs a leak and sinks, forcing the fishermen to abandon it; the airplane crashes into the sea, killing most of the passengers and forcing the rest to evacuate; the tour boat's motor is damaged, and one of the tourists is swept overboard and drowns. After the storm has abated, sharks are lured to the area by the dead inside the plane wreck, and subsequently kill one of the drifting survivors.

Once the cyclone is gone, the Mexican coast guard starts a fruitless search for the missing, and after three days they abandon hope of finding any survivors. The plane passengers are picked up by the fishermen, and later they are taken in by the drifting tour boat, for a total of twenty-seven people trying to survive. As food and water run out, the fishermen kill a dog belonging to one of the tourists for them to eat. When one of the fishermen dies, he is used to bait a shark, but the shark manages to snatch the corpse away. When one of the tourists perishes, his body is cut up and his flesh cured and salted for food. In addition, one of the female tourists gives birth to a baby. As the days wear on and the situation becomes more and more desperate, it is decided that several of the passengers and Pitorro, the trawler's captain, use the lifeboat to go for help. The drifters are eventually picked up by a passing American yacht, and rescue efforts are initiated.

As the night passes, a female passenger dies and is cast overboard by her grieving husband. The next day, when Taylor, a selfish passenger from the plane, tries to appropriate some of the sparse water supply for himself, a fight breaks out, in which course the glass bottom of the boat is shattered. The boat sinks, forcing the occupants into the water. As they float in the sea, sharks are attracted to the scene and devour almost half of the shipwrecked, including Taylor, before two seaplanes arrive and rescue the remaining survivors.

== Cast ==
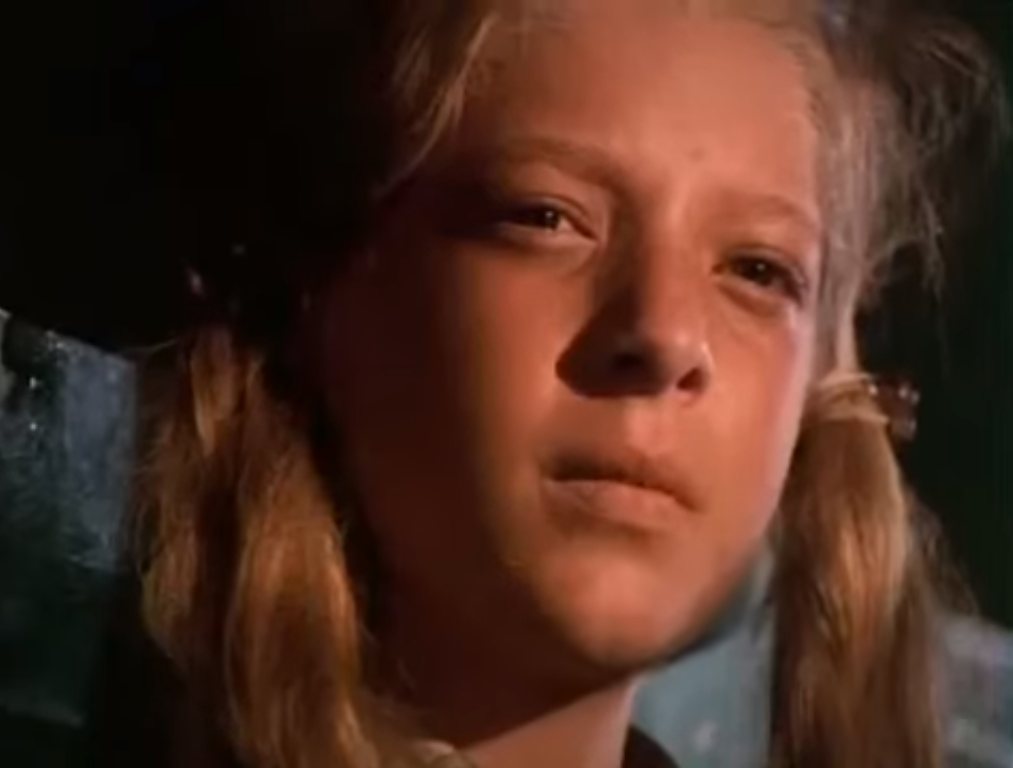
Edith González in the film trailer

- Arthur Kennedy as The Priest
- Carroll Baker as Sheila
- Lionel Stander as Taylor
- Andrés García as Andrés
- Hugo Stiglitz as Moby Dick Skipper
- Mario Almada as Pitorro
- Olga Karlatos as Monica
- Stefania D'Amario as Linda
- Edith González as Tirsa
- Milton Rodríguez as Gordon
- René Cardona III as Tomás
- Carlos East as Michael
- Ricardo Carrión as Dr. Rivas
- René Cardona as Montalvo
- Jorge Victoria as Manolo
- Ricardo Noriega as Aldo
- Roberto Schlosser as Cpt. Dawson

== Production ==
Much of the film was shot on or near the island of Cozumel, off the eastern coast of the Yucatán Peninsula.

== Release ==
The film was released in West Germany and Italy on July 21, 1978, and in Mexico on October 26. In the United States, the film was distributed by New Gold Entertainment.

=== Home media ===
The film was released on Blu-ray by Vinegar Syndrome, as a part of its "Cardona Collection: Volume 1".

== Alternate versions ==
On initial release, the German and Italian releases were severely censored, toning down the cannibalism subplot. The original cut of the film, released internationally, runs at 114 minutes, while the cut German and Italian releases ran 97 minutes.
