= 3 familias =

Mexican telenovela

- Genre: Telenovela
- Starring: Íngrid Martz; Carlos Espejel; Alma Cero; Sylvia Pasquel
- Theme music composer: Héctor Octavio Valdés
- Opening theme: "Tres familias HIB"
- Composer: Héctor Barragán
- Country of origin: Mexico
- Original language: Spanish
- No. of seasons: 1
- No. of episodes: 150

Production
- Executive producers: Joshua Mintz; Ana Celia Urquidi
- Camera setup: Multi-camera
- Production company: TV Azteca

Original release
- Network: Azteca Uno
- Release: October 23, 2017 – May 25, 2018

3 familias (stylized onscreen 3 familias, todos estamos bien), is a Mexican telenovela produced by Joshua Mintz and Ana Celia Urquidi for TV Azteca. It is an adaptation for Mexico of the Ecuadorian series of the same name. It premiered on October 23, 2017 and ended on May 25, 2018. It stars Íngrid Martz as the titular character. The production of the telenovela officially began on September 11, 2017.

== Plot ==
Despite their major differences, the Del Pedregal Barroso, Mejorada Lezama and Barrio Bravo are three happy marriages: they love each other, they respect each other, they have everything - except for the house of their dreams, since like many Mexicans they yearn to have the ideal home. Bela Barroso, after becoming a widow, will have to face her new condition: "new poor." She waits for a miracle that will solve such a shameful situation and remarries with Gonzalo Adolfo Del Pedregal, a businessman newly arrived in the city and hiding a dark secret. Meanwhile, at Marisa Lezama's insistence, Goyo Mejorada is more indebted than ever and on the brink of collapse. In the meantime, after briefly experiencing the life of the rich, Chabela Bravo and Chacho Barrio must return "close" to the house of Frida, Chabela‘s mother. Chayanne and Fer, son and daughter of Chacho and Gonzalo Adolfo, respectively, despite their differences star in an intense love story - unthinkable, of course, so their parents try to separate them at all costs.

== Cast ==
- Íngrid Martz as Bela Barroso
- Carlos Espejel as Chacho Barrio
- Sylvia Pasquel as Frida Bravo
- Alma Cero as Chabela Bravo
- Luis Curiel as Chayanne Barrio Chico
- Rodrigo Mejía as Gonzalo Adolfo del Pedregal
- Renata Manterola as Fer del Pedregal
- Alejandra Toussaint as Fátima Chico
- Rocío García as Marisa Lezama
- Ulises de la Torre as Goyo Mejorada
- Edith González as Katy
