= Mirtha Michelle =

American actress (born 1984)

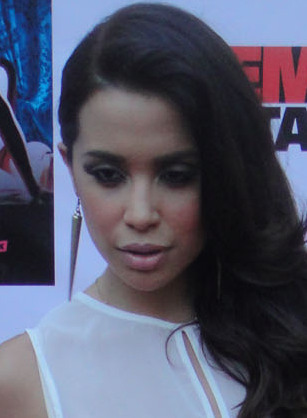
- Mirtha Michelle at Femme Fatales Season 2 Premiere in Hollywood (2012)
- Born: January 17, 1984 (age 41); Santo Domingo, Dominican Republic

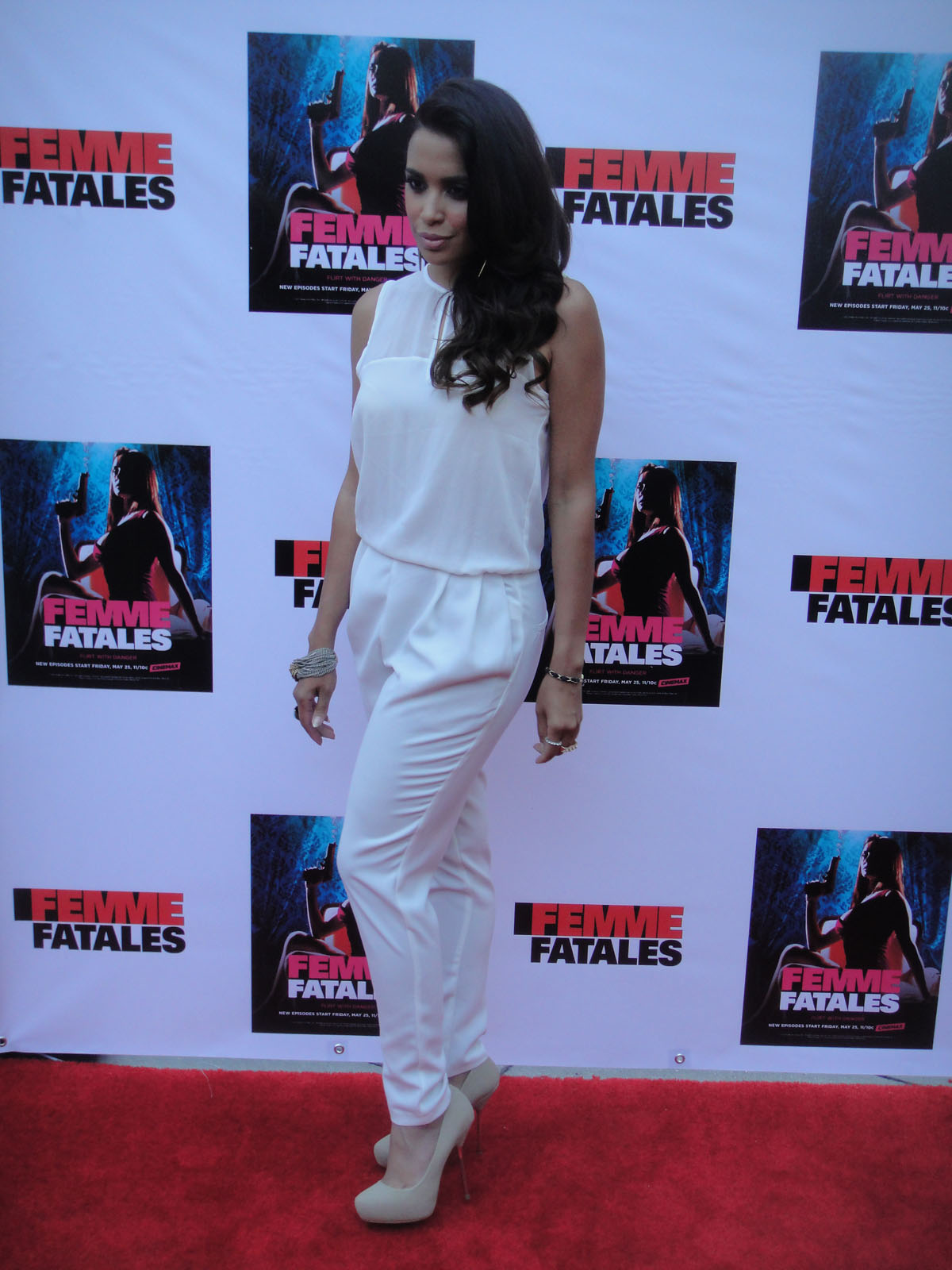
Mirtha Michelle at Femme Fatales Red Carpet (2012)

Mirtha Michelle (born January 17, 1984) is a Dominican-born American actress.

== Career ==
Michelle has appeared in Señorita Justice, This Christmas, Fast & Furious and Paydirt. She has also had small parts on CSI: Crime Scene Investigation and CSI: Miami.

When not acting, Michelle often emcees events in Las Vegas and Los Angeles.

== Filmography ==
=== Film ===
Year	Title	Role	Notes
2004	Señorita Justice	Vanessa Ortiz	
2005	Harder They Fall	Sage Dominguez	
2007	This Christmas	Bartender	
2008	Jada	Carina	
2009	Dough Boys	Selecia	
2009	Fast & Furious	Cara	
2015	AWOL-72	Amanda	
2020	Paydirt	Layla	

=== Television ===
Year	Title	Role	Notes
2006	CSI: Miami	Lucia Mansera	Episode: "Shock"
2007	CSI: Crime Scene Investigation	Latina Hooker	Episode: "Ending Happy"
2007	American Body Shop	Maria	Episode: "Stretchy Face"
2012	Femme Fatales	Lauren Coleston	Episode: "Killer Instinct"
