= Lucía Sombra =

Mexican telenovela

- Genre: Telenovela; Romance; Drama
- Created by: Fernanda Villeli
- Directed by: Antulio Jiménez Pons
- Starring: Ofelia Medina; Raúl Ramírez; Rosenda Monteros; Beatriz Sheridan; Alicia Palacios; Carlos Cámara; Susana Alexander
- Country of origin: Mexico
- Original language: Spanish
- No. of episodes: 211

Production
- Executive producer: David Antón
- Running time: 30 minutes

Original release
- Network: Telesistema Mexicano
- Release: 1971 – 1972

Related
- Historia de un amor; La maestra

Lucía Sombra is a Mexican telenovela produced by Televisa and transmitted by Telesistema Mexicano.

Ofelia Medina, Carlos Cámara, Rosenda Monteros and Raúl Ramírez starred as protagonists.

== Cast ==
- Ofelia Medina as Lucía Sombra Calvert
- Raúl Ramírez as Pastor Emilio Calvert
- Rosenda Monteros as Matilde Guerrero
- Beatriz Sheridan as Sara Calvert
- Alicia Palacios as Doña Florencia Guerrero
- Carlos Cámara as Dr. Pablo Orazábal Guerrero
- Susana Alexander as Erika
- Miguel Suárez Arias as Don Esteban Guerrero
- Enrique Novi as Román Calvert
- Andrea Palma as Doña Natividad
- Sergio Klainer as Aarón Siavinsky
- Ricardo Cortés as Rodrigo Rimac
- Víctor Alcocer as Padre Cristóbal
- Luis Miranda as Ignacio Suárez
- Wally Barrón as Alejo Suárez
- Pilar Sen as Helena Suárez
- Raúl "Chato" Padilla as Comisario Vidal
- Héctor Cruz as Dr. Ricardo Ledesma
- Octavio Galindo as Octavio Ravel
- Eric del Castillo as Santiago Rangel
- Silvia Mariscal as Teresa
- Luis Aragón as Sr. Ravel
- Aurora Clavel as Sra. Ravel
- Jorge del Campo as Minister Pierre Duwa
- Malena Doria as Deborah Duwa
- Enrique del Castillo as Dr. Islas
- Mauricio Ferrari as Sr. Rimac
- Alberto Inzúa as Owner of the mine
- Margie Bermejo as Srta. Rangel
- Fernando Borges as Sr. Rangel
- Ada Carrasco as Peasant
- Gerardo del Castillo as Peasant
- Norma Jiménez Pons as Rodrigo's wife
- Edith González as Erika (child)
- Fernando Castro
- Marcela Davilland
- Ricardo Austi
