= Los bandidos del río frío (TV series) =

Mexican telenovela

- Genre: Telenovela
- Created by: Original Story: Manuel Payno; Adaptation: Edmundo Báez
- Directed by: Antulio Jiménez Pons
- Starring: Julissa; Víctor Alcocer
- Country of origin: Mexico
- Original language: Spanish

Original release
- Network: Televisión Independiente de México
- Release: 1976

Los bandidos del río frío is a Mexican telenovela directed by Antulio Jiménez Pons for Televisión Independiente de México in 1976.

== Cast ==
- Julissa as Cecilia
- Ofelia Guilmáin as Calavera Catrina
- Víctor Alcocer
- Júlio Aldama as Evaristo
- Sergio Bustamante as Relumbrón
- Blanca Sánchez as Mariana
- Rogelio Guerra as Juan Robreño
- Norma Lazareno as Casilda
- Miguel Manzano as Licenciado Olañeta
- Jorge del Campo as Lamparilla
- José Carlos Ruiz as Bedolla
- Carmelita González as Pascuala
