= Cosa juzgada =

Mexican telenovela

- Genre: Telenovela
- Country of origin: Mexico
- Original language: Spanish

Original release
- Network: Telesistema Mexicano
- Release: 1970

Cosa juzgada (English title:Res Judicata) is a Mexican telenovela produced by Televisa and transmitted by Telesistema Mexicano in 1970.

== Cast ==
- Luz María Aguilar
- Sergio Bustamante
- Miguel Córcega
- Edith González
