= La maestra =

Mexican telenovela

- Genre: Telenovela; Romance; Drama
- Directed by: Miguel Córcega
- Starring: Enrique Lizalde; Blanca Sánchez; Rosario Granados; Sandra Chávez
- Country of origin: Mexico
- Original language: Spanish
- No. of episodes: 34

Production
- Running time: 30 minutes

Original release
- Network: Telesistema Mexicano
- Release: 1971 – 1971

Related
- Lucía Sombra; La maldición de la blonda

La maestra (English title:The teacher) is a Mexican telenovela produced by Televisa and transmitted by Telesistema Mexicano.

== Cast ==
- Enrique Lizalde
- Blanca Sánchez
- Rosario Granados
- Sandra Chávez
- Oscar Morelli
- Jaime Fernández
