= Guajira (TV series) =

- Created by: Fernando Gaitán
- Based on: Torrecillas
- Written by: Myriam de Lourdes
- Directed by: Pepe Sánchez
- Starring: Sonya Smith; Rafael Novoa; Guy Ecker; Carolina Sabino
- Opening theme: "Guajira", performed by Miguel y Julián
- Ending theme: "Guajira", performed by Miguel y Julián
- Country of origin: Colombia
- Original language: Spanish

Production
- Producer: Amparo de Gómez
- Production locations: Bogotá and Guajira Peninsula (La Guajira Department), Colombia
- Camera setup: Multicamera
- Production company: RCN Televisión

Original release
- Network: Canal A
- Release: February 29, 1996 – January 26, 1997

Related
- Las Juanas

Guajira [ɡwaˈxiɾa] is a Colombian telenovela produced by RCN Televisión in 1996. This is a TV adaptation of Torrecillas ("small towers"), a novel written by Myriam de Lourdes (mother of Carolina Sabino), who portrayed the character of "Josefina".

== Plot ==
Sonia Arbeláez (Sonya Smith) and Felipe Uribe (Rafael Novoa) have been friends since childhood, growing up together and sharing many special moments. However, in their final year of high school, Sonia meets Helmut Heidenberg (Guy Ecker), a mining engineer twice her age whose charm captivates any young woman.

Sonia, with her beauty and charm, wins over Helmut, while Felipe discovers that what he truly feels for his best friend is love.

Helmut is sent to La Guajira by his company to conduct a technical study for the construction of a mine in the region, unaware that this trip will take a dramatic turn for him. Upon arriving in La Guajira, Helmut is surprised by a group of Wayuu people who lead him to the ranchería of Abelino, the tribe's chief and the most influential person in the area. That night, he meets Úrsula Epieyú, Abelino's niece, who was raised by the family after her parents died in a caste war. Úrsula falls in love with Helmut at first sight.

After a few days, Úrsula is asked to marry Anselmo, a local chief from the neighboring ranch. However, to reject Anselmo's proposal, Úrsula lies to Abelino and the entire family, claiming that Helmut had assaulted her. This has serious consequences for Helmut, as he is forced to answer for the crime committed in the ranch.

Helmut is located by Tulio, who speaks to him in derogatory terms, believing Helmut to be guilty, to which Helmut refuses to respond. Tulio then goes to the ranchería and tells Abelino about Helmut's refusal, thus beginning a conflict with him. Three men from the Epieyú family go to Bogotá to look for him, but they are unsuccessful. The three men, Ramón, Martín, and José, finally arrive at Sonia's house, where a pre-wedding gift exchange is taking place, and speak with Felipe, who informs them that Helmut is in La Guajira. They then return to the ranchería.

Meanwhile, in La Guajira, Helmut acquires animals to atone for the offense so he can speak with Abelino about Úrsula. With Sidro acting as mediator, and thanks to the confirmation that Úrsula is Majayura through a parisa test, Helmut is found innocent and forgiven by Abelino and the Epiayú family.

But when the three men arrived at the ranch, they found him talking with Úrsula and shot him, leaving him seriously wounded just hours before his wedding. At the ranch, they began treating him for injuries sustained during the war, but he decided to go to Bogotá on his own to fulfill his marriage commitments. Upon arriving in Bogotá, he married Sonia, and on their wedding night, he collapsed from internal bleeding caused by the bullet wound.

Felipe then goes to the United States to escape the disappointment caused by Sonia's marriage. There he meets Cindy Thompson, whom he marries two years later, and they have a daughter named Paula. Ten years later, Helmut accepts a position as operations manager at the coal mine he had conceived in La Guajira. During this time, Helmut experiences significant moments with the beautiful young Wayuu woman, Úrsula Epieyú (Carolina Sabino). Úrsula will play a crucial role in the relationships Helmut and his company establish with the entire Wayuu community, as they both strive to protect the well-being of the community and their lands. All of this leads Helmut to question everything from his own life and beliefs to his relationship with Sonia, his wife.

As a result, Helmut will have to face a series of trials. When he first arrived in La Guajira, he had given his word in Abelino's settlement, a pact that if the mine were built, the Epiayú and the people of the other settlements would not leave their lands. However, after work began on the road adjacent to the mine, the settlement ended up right in the middle of the planned route, forcing Helmut to break his promise and reach agreements almost on the fly. Meanwhile, Úrsula faces the rejection of her Wayuu tribe because of her continued support for Helmut and is eventually banished. She has to go to Bogotá in search of her aunt Amelia, who doesn't want her but agrees to take her in. Before long, Helmut is captivated by the desert landscape of La Guajira and the mysticism of its culture, neglecting his young wife. Sonia cannot get used to these strange lands; she feels sad and lonely at home because of her husband's work, which takes up most of his time.

When Helmut moves to La Guajira with his wife and two children, he meets Rafael Pineda, a local politician, at a party. Pineda forces him to make a bet on the mine's production, as he never believed Helmut's coal project would be so successful. The bet stipulates that Helmut must kill himself if the mine fails, while Pineda would do the same if the mine is a success and the department receives $5 million in royalties. Sonia is unaware of the situation, but this problem causes Helmut to neglect his marriage. Meanwhile, Felipe is sent to La Guajira by the head of Benson to replace an engineer who was coming from Australia but had a mysterious mishap and couldn't travel. But what nobody knew was that Felipe actually wanted to return to Colombia as a graduate, prepared to fight for Sonia from within the mining industry, so he took charge of the mine's maintenance department to be close to Sonia without raising suspicion.

But then a debate is planned in Bogotá to destroy the mine through the government, so Helmut decides to go to Bogotá, a situation that Felipe takes advantage of to seduce Sonia.

In the midst of the debates, Pineda finds Úrsula and forces her to testify against Helmut, hoping to make him lose the debate and shut down the mine. However, Úrsula defends him. When Helmut tries to speak with Úrsula at Amelia's house, her cousins and others try to attack him, leading Amelia to throw Úrsula out. Helmut then decides to take her to his apartment to look after her and leave her in Mónica's care before returning to La Guajira. Helmut returns after the debates are over and begins to suspect Felipe and Sonia's clandestine meetings. One day, he catches them leaving the maintenance workers' quarters together, which leads to an argument that leaves Helmut devastated. Meanwhile, Cindy, who had always suspected that Felipe still loved the woman he had left behind in Colombia, investigates with the help of Lina María and Anabel, Sonia's friends, and discovers that the woman is indeed Sonia. She confronts her in front of everyone at the mine. Sonia then goes to Bogotá, and Felipe follows her after Cindy leaves him and goes to the United States with her daughter.

As the year ends, the mine's financial situation deteriorates and coal production declines, forcing Helmut to commit suicide to fulfill his bet with Pineda. Upon learning this, Sonia returns to La Guajira to prevent Helmut's suicide, and it is then that she realizes she has never stopped loving him and decides to end her affair with Felipe.

The story comes to an end when, after preventing Helmut's suicide, Sonia returns to La Guajira to spend Christmas Day with the children. That night, Helmut discovers a letter the children wrote him, telling him that Sonia had never stopped loving him. The next day, while meeting with Alejo, Lina María, Anabel, and the children at the beach, Sonia confirms to her friends that she will no longer be going with Felipe. They then tell Helmut this in order to encourage reconciliation, leaving Sonia alone with Helmut so they can talk openly and clear up any doubts. Helmut and Sonia reconcile, vowing never to betray each other.

== Cast ==
- Sonya Smith as Sonia Arbeláez (main heroine)
- Guy Ecker as Helmut Heidenberg (main hero, Sonia's husband)
- Rafael Novoa as Felipe Uribe
- Carolina Sabino as Ursula Epieyu

Additional:

- Luis Fernando Ardila as Engineer David (1st)
- Ismael Barrios as Meyo
- Manuel Busquets as Engineer David (2nd)
- Carlos Humberto Camacho as Sergio
- Rafael Cardoso as Alejo Pugliese
- Kika Child as Natalia
- Myriam de Lourdes as Josefina
- Constanza Duque as Marina de Arbeláez (Sonia's mother)
- Julio Echeverri as Robert Fajardo
- Alcira Gil as Edith
- Marisela González as María
- Yuldor Gutiérrez as Tulio
- Eloísa Maestre as Lina María de Gómez
- Edgardo Román as Avelino "El Cacique Ipuana"
- Pilar Uribe as Cindy Thomson de Uribe(Felipe's wife)
- Herbert King as Rafael Pineda
- Franky Linero as Tom Maverick
- Lizeth Mahecha
- Andrés Martínez
- Carminia Martínez
- Andrea Quejuán as Remedios
- Germán Quintero as Roberto Gómez
- Julián Román as Ramón
- Jennifer Steffens as Anabel de Pugliese
- Luis Tamayo as Cidro
- Katherine Vélez as Mónica de Fajardo

== International broadcasters ==
=== South América ===
- Argentina: América 2
- Paraguay: Red Guaraní
- Venezuela
