= La maldición de la blonda =

Mexican telenovela

- Genre: Telenovela; Romance; Drama
- Directed by: Fernando Wagner
- Starring: Gloria Marín; Nadia Milton; Carlos Piñar; Dunia Saldívar
- Country of origin: Mexico
- Original language: Spanish
- No. of episodes: 35

Production
- Running time: 60 minutes

Original release
- Network: Telesistema Mexicano
- Release: 1971 – 1971

Related
- La maestra; Las máscaras

La maldición de la blonda (English title:The curse of the lace) is a Mexican telenovela produced by Televisa and transmitted by Telesistema Mexicano.

== Cast ==
- Gloria Marín as Doña Concepcion
- Nadia Milton as Manuela
- Carlos Piñar
- Dunia Saldívar
- Rafael del Río
- Socorro Avelar
- Eric del Castillo
- Fedora Capdevila as Juvencia
- Malena Doria as Dolores
- Edith González
- Nina Green as Cora
- Miguel Ángel Sanroman as Fabian
