= Diana Bracho =

Mexican actress (born 1944)

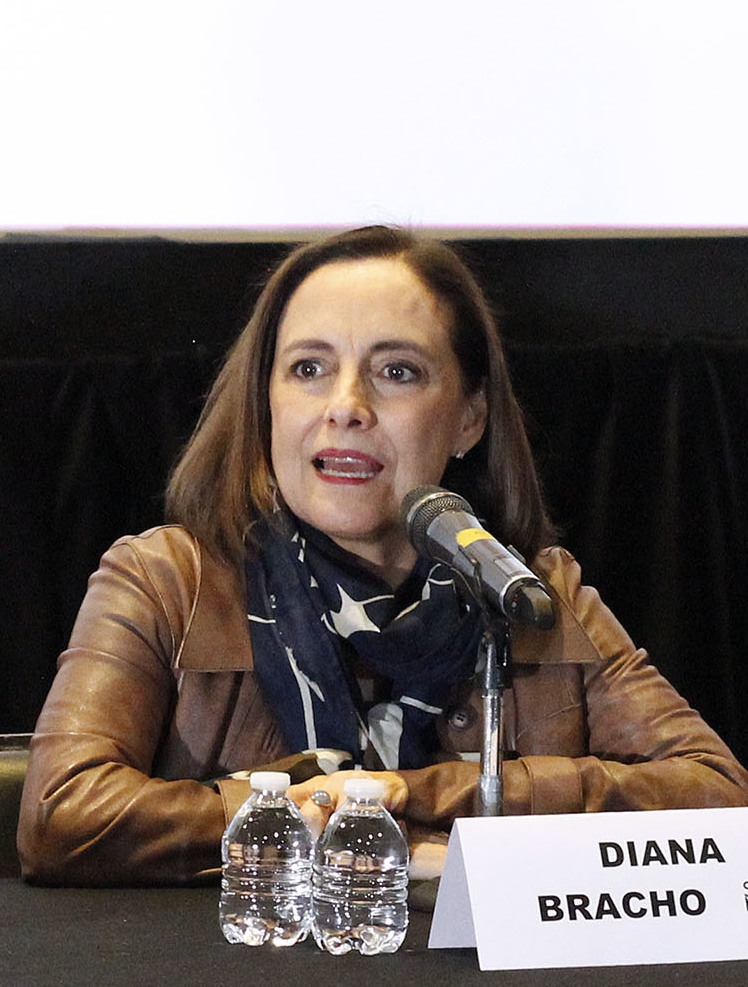
- Bracho in 2018
- Born: Diana Guadalupe Bracho y Bordes Mangel; December 12, 1944 (age 81); Mexico City, Mexico
- Occupation: Actress
- Years active: 1949-1950, 1970-present

Diana Bracho (born Diana Guadalupe Bracho y Bordes Mangel; 12 December 1944) is a Mexican actress.

== Early life ==
Diana Bracho is the daughter of actor/director Julio Bracho, the niece of actress Andrea Palma and the aunt of actor Julio Bracho (named after his grandfather).

== Career ==
She made her film debut as a child actress in two of her father's films: San Felipe (1949) and Immaculate Conception (1950). She studied Philosophy and Letters in New York. She debuted professionally on stage in the play Israfel by Abelardo Rodríguez alongside Sergio Bustamante. Her television debut was in 1973. Diana Bracho won the Silver Ariel award twice, the first time in 1973.

She won her second Silver Ariel for El infierno, de todos tan temído and was nominated for Best Actress for Letters from Marusia (1976) and Entre Pancho Villa y una mujer desnuda (1996). On August 6, 2002 she was appointed president of the Academia Mexicana de Artes y Ciencias Cinematográficas. She has been involved in co-productions with countries such as The Chess Player (France); Edmilson (Germany), The Dogs of War (Britain), The Aleph (Italy), The legend of the Drum (Spain), Antonieta (Spain) and On Wings of Eagles (United States).

She starred in several television series and soap operas, notably as Leonora Navarro in the telenovela Cuna de lobos (1986), produced by Carlos Tellez. She also played the villainous Evangelina Vizcaíno in Cadenas de Amargura (1991), produced by Carlos Sotomayor. She played the role of the black widow in the third season of Mujeres Asesinas. Though Diana was confirmed to star in Salvador Mejía's new telenovela: La tempestad, she rejected her participation.

== Filmography ==
=== Films ===
Year	Title	Role	Notes
1949	Philip of Jesus	Child Rosalia	Uncredited
1950	Immaculate	Child Rosalia	
1973	The Castle of Purity	Utopía	
1974	El santo oficio	Mariana de Carvajal	
1974	El encuentro de un hombre solo	Renata Castillo	
1975	El cumpleaños del perro	Silvia Ballesteros	
1976	Actas de Marusia	Luisa	
1976	El hombre del puente	La Muchacha	
1976	Las Poquianchis	Adelina	
1977	No More, No Less	Unknown role	
1979	La tía Alejandra	Lucía	
1980	The Dogs of War	Nun	
1981	El infierno de todos tan temido	Andrea	
1981	La leyenda del tambor	Paula	
1981	El héroe desconocido	Chela	
1982	Antonieta	Juana	Uncredited
1982	Yo no lo se de cierto, lo supongo	Dalia	
1986	Redondo	María Magdalena	
1988	El secreto de Romelia	Dolores de Román	
1992	Serpientes y escaleras	Adelaida	
1996	Entre Pancho Villa y una mujer desnuda	Gina López	
1997	Un baúl lleno de miedo	Cristina de Estévez	
1998	Al borde	Sarah Narro	
1998	The Other Conquest	Doña Juana	
2001	Y tu mamá también	Silvia Allende de Iturbide	
2002	Me llamo Benjamín	Diana	Short film
2002	Vivir mata	Reportera	
2002	Las caras de la luna	Magdalena Hoyos	
2003	El umbral	Mercedes	Short film
2003	Dreaming of Julia	Beta	
2007	J-ok'el	J-ok'el	
2007	Eros una vez María	María, madre de Tonatiuh	
2007	Quemar las Naves	Catalina	
2008	3:19	Lucía	
2008	Divina confusión	Julia	
2009	Cabeza de buda	Tomás's mother	Voice role
2010	Martín al amanecer	Lucía	
2011	Mi universo en minúsculas	Josefina	
2015	María Bonita	María Félix	
2015	Apasionado Pancho Villa	Sra Corral	
2022	¡Qué despadre!	Ofelia	

=== Television performances ===
Year	Title	Role	Notes
1973	Mi primer amor	Elena	
1973	Los miserables	Cosette	
1974	La casa de Bernarda Alba	Amelia	Television film
1979	El amor llego mas tarde	Mrs. Dobuti	
1979	Ángel Guerra	Lorenza	
1981	Los Pardaillan	Luisa	
1981	Histoires extraordinaires	Unknown role	"Le joueur d'échecs de Maelzel" (Season 1, Episode 1)
1982	Leona Vicario	Leona Vicario	
1985	Esperándote	Isabel	
1986	On Wings of Eagles	Mrs. Dobuti	"Part II" (Season 1, Episode 2)
1986	Cuna de lobos	Leonora Navarro Castillejos de Larios	Main role
1988	Pasión y poder	Ana Laura Gómez Luna	Main role
1991	Cadenas de amargura	Evangelina Vizcaíno	Main cast
1993	Capricho	Eugenia	Main cast
1994	El vuelo del águila	Sara Pérez de Madero	
1995	Mujer, casos de la vida real	Aurora	"Quién soy yo?" (Season 11, Episode 3)
1995	Alondra	Alondra	
1995–96	Retrato de familia	Irene	
1998–99	El privilegio de amar	Young Ana Joaquina Velarde	Main cast
1999	Infierno en el paraíso	Dariana Valdivia	Main cast
2001	El derecho de nacer	Clemencia Rivera de del Junco	Main cast
2003	Bajo la misma piel	Sara Ortiz Escalante de Murillo	Main cast
2006	Heridas de amor	Bertha de Aragón	Main cast
2007	Sexo y otros secretos	Isadora	4 episodes
2008	Fuego en la sangre	Doña Gabriela Acevedo Vda. de Elizondo	Main cast
2010	Locas de amor	Regina	
2010	Mujeres asesinas	Norma Blanco	"Las Blanco, viudas" (Season 3, Episode 4)
2011	Rafaela	Morelia	Main cast
2013–14	Quiero amarte	Lucrecia	Main cast
2016	El hotel de los secretos	Teresa de Alarcón	Main cast
2017–2019	Mi marido tiene familia	Blanca Gómez de Córcega	Main cast
2021	¿Qué le pasa a mi familia?	Luz Torres Mendoza	Main role
2023	Eternamente amándonos	Martina Rangel	Main cast
2025	Regalo de amor	Catalina Ortigoza de la Vega	Main cast
2026	Hermanas, un amor compartido	Antonia Cué	

== Awards and nominations ==
Year	Awards	Category	Telenovela	Result
1987	Premios TVyNovelas	Best Lead Actress	Cuna de lobos	Won
1992	Premios TVyNovelas	Best Lead Actress	Cadenas de amargura	Won
1994	Premios TVyNovelas	Best Female Antagonist	Capricho	Won
2007	Premios TVyNovelas	Best First Actress	Heridas de amor	Nominated
2009	Premios TVyNovelas	Best Female Antagonist	Fuego en la sangre	Won
