= El edificio de enfrente =

Mexican telenovela

- Genre: Telenovela
- Created by: Julio Porter
- Directed by: Guillermo Diazayas
- Starring: Ignacio López Tarso; Susana Alexander
- Country of origin: Mexico
- Original language: Spanish

Production
- Executive producers: Antulio Jimenez Pons; Augusto Elías

Original release
- Network: Televisión Independiente de México
- Release: May 30, 1972 – April 1, 1973

El edificio de enfrente is a Mexican telenovela produced by Augusto Elías and Antulio Jimenez Pons for Televisión Independiente de México in 1972.

== Cast ==
- Ignacio López Tarso - Arturo
- Susana Alexander - Carolina
- Julio Aldama
- Luis Aragón
- Fernanda Ayensa - Dorita
- Rafael Baledón
- Susana Dosamantes - Celia
- July Furlong
- Octavio Galindo
- Queta Lavat
- Nelly Meden
- Oscar Morelli
- Germán Robles
- Emma Roldán - Lupe
- Enrique Álvarez Félix
- Alfredo W. Barrón
- José Baviera
- Verónica Castro - Carmen
- Edith González - Martha
- María Rojo - María Luz
- Martha Roth
