= La jaula de oro (TV series) =

- Genre: Telenovela
- Created by: María Zarattini
- Written by: María Zarattini; Irma Ramos
- Directed by: José Rendón; Luis Vélez
- Starring: Edith González; Saúl Lisazo; René Casados; María Teresa Rivas; Antonio Medellín
- Opening theme: La plegaria by Alexis Aranda; Ámame (only in United States) by Alexandre Pires
- Ending theme: High definition by Francis Monkman
- Country of origin: Mexico
- Original language: Spanish
- No. of episodes: 70

Production
- Executive producer: José Rendón
- Producer: Roberto Hernández Vázquez
- Production locations: Filming; Televisa San Ángel; Mexico City, Mexico; Locations; Mexico City, D.F., Mexico
- Cinematography: Jorge Miguel Valdés; Óscar Palacios
- Running time: 41-44 minutes (episodes 1-30); 31-33 minutes (episodes 31-70)
- Production company: Televisa

Original release
- Network: Canal de las Estrellas
- Release: April 28 – August 1, 1997

Related
- De pura sangre (1985–1986); Amor bravío (2012)

La jaula de oro (English: The Golden Cage) is a Mexican telenovela produced by José Rendón for Televisa in 1997. Directed by José Rendón and Luis Vélez, it stars Edith González and Saúl Lisazo. It aired from April 28 to August 1, 1997, replacing Te sigo amando and was replaced by María Isabel.

== Cast ==
- Edith González as Oriana Valtierra/Carolina Valtierra/Renata Duarte
- Saúl Lisazo as Alex Moncada/Franco
- René Casados as Flavio Canet
- María Teresa Rivas as Ofelia Valtierra Vda. de Casasola
- Antonio Medellín as Omar
- Patricio Castillo as Benjamín Acevedo
- Cecilia Coronel as Elis Canet
- Arcelia Ramírez as Martha
- Vanessa Bauche as Cristina
- Socorro Bonilla as Doña Tere
- Fernando Sáenz as Valerio
- Jaime Lozano as Artemio
- Kenia Gazcón as Camelia
- Alpha Acosta as Marianela
- Isaura Espinoza as Dolores
- Edi Xol as Alberto
- Ricardo Dalmacci as Gustavo
- María de Souza as Amira
- Bárbara Gómez as Regina
- Tony Marcín as Ana
- Ana María Jacobo as Severina
- Ernesto Rivas as Sergio
- Janet Ruiz as Rosa
- Fernando Rubio as Maximino
- Zulema Cruz as Announcer
- Claudio Rojo as Police officer
- Judith Muedano as Receptionist
- Francisco Haros as César Valtierra
- José Olivares as Young man
- Julián de Jesús Núñez as Pedro
- María Dolores Oliva as Irene
