= Señorita Justice =

- Directed by: Kantz
- Written by: Daniel Chiu; Daniel Wai Chiu
- Starring: Yancy Mendia; Mirtha Michelle; Kalex; Michael Francis; Edith González; Eva Longoria; Tito Puente Jr. Luis Garaza
- Distributed by: Lionsgate
- Release date: May 11, 2004
- Running time: 86 minutes
- Country: United States
- Language: English

Senorita Justice is a 2004 film directed by Kantz. It is one of the first features from the low-budget production house Breakaway Films.

== Plot ==
Anna Rios is a young lawyer who negotiates property agreements in the city of Miami. She learns that her younger brother was murdered in a gang-related drive-by attack, and that her father had emotionally broken down. She takes a sabbatical from work, and heads into the streets of town. Anna enlists the help of her childhood friend Vanessa, and an old flame, Hector, to help avenge the death of her brother.

Anna meets two female cops, Detective Edith Garcia and Detective Roselyn Martinez who are investigating her brother's murder, but are renowned less for their detection skills. Both Garcia and Martinez become persuaded into believing that one of Anna's childhood friends, Hector, witnessed the slaying. He, however, is unwilling to cooperate. That night, Anna embarks on a personal quest to find her brother's killers, changing into street clothes and assuming the identity of "Señorita Justice".

Anna's search for the killers leads her to a sleazy gang leader named Mo, who turns out to be under the thumb of local businessman Manny Sanchez. Manny is determined to instigate a gang war to drive them out of the neighborhood for a real estate business. Anna is pursued by Detective Garcia, as well as by Mo's gang members, and a ruthless female Yakuza assassin, Chiba. When Mo is killed in a similar drive-by shooting, Anna thinks that she has been looking in the wrong place and focuses her attention on Hector. He admits to Anna that although he was with her brother that night, he himself might have been the target.

When Hector makes plans with Anna to leave the neighborhood, he is gunned down in another drive-by shooting. Thinking that Manny Sanchez is behind it, Anna teams up with Vanessa to abduct Manny as he is leaving his office and try to get him to confess. Vanessa reveals that she killed Anna's brother while pursuing Hector, who was investigating Manny, and that she became romantically involved with Hector. She commits suicide by shooting herself out of guilt. Anna forces Manny to take her to a seedy motel, where the two thugs he hired to terrorize the neighborhood are residing. Anna breaks into their room and kills both of them in a quick shootout, as well as Manny.

Anna goes back to her law office building where she confronts her former boss, Charles Adams, who has been working behind the scenes to orchestrate the ordeal. When Anna tries to shoot him, she is attacked by Chiba, who was sent from Japan to kill her. After a brutal fistfight in the lobby of the building, Anna gets the upper hand and killing Chiba by slashing her neck with her own necklace. Anna is confronted by Charles, who holds her at gunpoint. Detective Garcia runs in and shoots him dead.

Detectives Garcia and Martinez arrive at Anna's house to thank her for solving the case. Anna tells them that she has decided to stay in her old neighborhood and live with her father when he returns. She plans to open up her own law practice to help those less fortunate than her. When the detectives leave to respond to a call, Anna retrieves her street clothes from her suitcase, implying that she intends to continue fighting crime as Señorita Justice.

== Cast ==
- Yancy Mendia as Anna Rios
- Mirtha Michelle as Vanessa Ortiz
- Kalax as Hector Fernandez
- Michael Francis as Mo Gutierez
- Edith González as Detective Christine Garcia
- Eva Longoria as Detective Roselyn Martinez
- Tito Puente Jr. as Manny Sanchez
- Angelo Fierro as Carlos Rios
- Luis Garaza as Charles Adams
- Felix Sama as Freddy Lopez
- James De La Raza as Lenny Lopez
- Grayce Wey as Chiba
