= El amor llegó más tarde =

Mexican telenovela

- Genre: Telenovela
- Created by: Original Story: Corin Tellado; Adaptation: Carlos Olmos
- Directed by: Miguel Sabido
- Starring: Diana Bracho; Sergio Bustamante
- Country of origin: Mexico
- Original language: Spanish
- No. of episodes: 20

Production
- Executive producer: Irene Sabido
- Cinematography: Karlos Velázquez

Original release
- Network: Canal de las Estrellas
- Release: 1979

El amor llegó más tarde (English: Love Came Later is a Mexican telenovela produced by Irene Sabido for Televisa in 1979.

== Cast ==
- Diana Bracho as Mrs. Dobuti
- Sergio Bustamante
- Magda Guzmán
- Jorge Ortiz de Pinedo
- July Furlong
- Enrique Barrera- Eduardo
- Rebeca Rambal-Lucy
- Carmen Delgado-Pili
