= La mentira (1998 TV series) =

- Genre: Telenovela
- Created by: Caridad Bravo Adams
- Written by: Nora Alemán; Martín Támez; René Borbolla; Alejandra León de la Barra
- Directed by: Sergio Cataño; Rafael Estebán; Claudio Reyes Rubio
- Starring: Kate del Castillo; Guy Ecker; Karla Álvarez; Salvador Pineda; Rosa María Bianchi; Sergio Basáñez; Eric del Castillo
- Opening theme: "Me voy a quitar de en medio" by Vicente Fernández
- Country of origin: Mexico
- Original language: Spanish
- No. of episodes: 100

Production
- Executive producer: Carlos Sotomayor
- Producer: Rafael Urióstegui
- Production locations: Televisa San Ángel; Mexico City, Mexico
- Cinematography: Armando Zafra; Marco Rodríguez
- Camera setup: Multi-camera
- Running time: 41-44 minutes
- Production company: Televisa

Original release
- Network: Canal de las Estrellas
- Release: July 13 – November 27, 1998

La Mentira (Lit. title: The Lie / International title: Twisted Lies) is a Mexican telenovela produced by Carlos Sotomayor for Televisa. The telenovela aired on Canal de las Estrellas from July 13, 1998 to November 27, 1998. It is an adaptation of the 1965 telenovela of the same name.

It stars Kate del Castillo, Guy Ecker, Karla Álvarez, Salvador Pineda, Rosa María Bianchi, Sergio Basáñez and Eric del Castillo.

== Plot ==
Demetrio Azunsolo arrives in a small remote village in Jalisco where his beloved half-brother, Ricardo Platas, used to live and run a tequila plantation, only to find out that the latter has just committed suicide, after being betrayed by a selfish, greedy woman.

Little by little, and thanks to the village inhabitants - who at first are hostile towards him but then become his friends - Demetrio puts together the pieces of the puzzle that led to the tragedy.

The clues bring him to Mexico City, in the villa of a wealthy family, the Fernandez-Negretes who are the owners of the FERNE Bank, one of the most important banks in Mexico, where Ricardo had spent some time in the past as a trusted worker.

According to the info he has in hand, in that house lives the woman who is the cause of Ricardo's suicide. Demetrio meets two young women there, both nieces of the family: the innocent and fragile Virginia Fernandez-Negrete and the dynamic and self-confident Verónica Fernandez-Negrete.

Not sure who of them is the guilty one, Demetrio gets trapped in a series of co-incidences and sly gossip and ends up believing in the end that the woman he is looking for is Verónica.

Once ascertained, he puts to practice his plan for revenge. He flirts with Verónica, seduces her and makes her fall in love with him so as to marry him. After the wedding, he practically abducts her and brings her to the small remote village where Ricardo ended his life, decides to make her life a misery and take revenge for his brother's death.

Little does he know that he, as well as Verónica, are in fact victims of someone whose angel face hides a demonic soul and who actually was the one responsible for Ricardo's suicide.

When he finds out, it seems that all is lost as Verónica abandons him because he doesn't trust her and instead has been taken in by gossip and deception; so he must struggle to regain her love. In the end, love wins, but not without cost.

== Cast ==
=== Main ===
- Kate del Castillo as Verónica Fernández-Negrete
- Guy Ecker as Demetrio Azúnsolo
- Karla Álvarez as Virginia Fernández-Negrete
- Salvador Pineda as Dr. Francisco Moguel
- Rosa María Bianchi as Sara Montero de Fernández-Negrete
- Sergio Basáñez as Juan Fernández-Negrete Montero
- Eric del Castillo as Teodoro Fernández-Negrete
- Blanca Guerra as Miranda Montesinos
- Aarón Hernán as Father Pablo Williams
- Carlos Cámara as Don José "Pepe" Diez
- Silvia Mariscal as Leticia "Lety" Montero
- Guillermo Rivas as Professor Aguirre
- Tony Bravo as André Belot
- Tina Romero as Irma de Moguel
- Luis Gatica as Santiago Terrazas
- Israel Jaitovich as Jacinto Ávila
- Roxana Castellanos as Yadira Balanzario
- Amparo Garrido as Antonia "Toña"
- Julio Bracho as Carlitos Jr.

=== Recurring ===
- Mayrín Villanueva as Nicole Belot
- José Antonio Ferral as Natalicio Gómez "Don Nato"
- Claudia Eliza Aguilar as Gildarda
- Vanessa Arias as Beatriz "Betty"
- Gabriela Arroyo as Maruquita
- Antonio de la Vega as Pepe Martínez
- Vicente Herrera as Mauricio Pérez
- Gustavo Negrete as Carlos
- Rodrigo Abed as Ricardo Platas
- Alex Trillanes as Marcos
- Claudia Troyo as Irazema
- Audrey Vera as Karla
- Sergio Reynoso as Lawyer Ernesto Saucedo
- Liza Willert as Mrs. Gilbert
- Carmela Masso as Chona
- Eugenia Avendaño as Guadalupe de Martínez
- Alexandra Monterrubio as Julia
- Miguel Ángel Biaggio as Waiter

== Awards and nominations ==
Year	Award	Category	Nominee(s)	Result
1999	17th TVyNovelas Awards	Best Telenovela	Carlos Sotomayor	Nominated
1999	17th TVyNovelas Awards	Best Actor	Guy Ecker	Nominated
1999	17th TVyNovelas Awards	Best Antagonist Actress	Karla Álvarez	Nominated
1999	17th TVyNovelas Awards	Best Antagonist Actor	Luis Gatica	Nominated
1999	17th TVyNovelas Awards	Best Leading Actress	Rosa Maria Bianchi	Nominated
1999	17th TVyNovelas Awards	Best Leading Actor	Eric del Castillo	Nominated
1999	17th TVyNovelas Awards	Best Supporting Actor	Sergio Basáñez	Nominated
1999	17th TVyNovelas Awards	Best Young Lead Actress	Kate del Castillo	Nominated
1999	17th TVyNovelas Awards	Best Young Lead Actor	Guy Ecker	Won
1999	17th TVyNovelas Awards	Best Original Story or Adaptation	Nora Alemán	Won
1999	17th TVyNovelas Awards	Best Art Design	Rocío Vélez	Won
1999	17th TVyNovelas Awards	Best Decor	Rosalba Santoyo	Won
1999	Bravo Awards	Best Actress	Kate del Castillo	Won
1999	Bravo Awards	Best Actor	Guy Ecker	Won
1999	Bravo Awards	Best Adaptation	Nora Alemán	Won
1999	Califa de Oro Awards	Outstanding Performance	Aarón Hernán	Won
2000	Latin ACE Awards	Best Scenic Program	La mentira	Won
2000	Latin ACE Awards	Best Direction	Sergio Cataño	Won
