= Las máscaras =

Mexican telenovela

- Genre: Telenovela; Romance; Drama
- Created by: Carlos Lozano Dana
- Directed by: Raúl Araiza
- Starring: Marga López; Joaquín Cordero; Irán Eory; Rita Macedo; María Rubio
- Country of origin: Mexico
- Original language: Spanish
- No. of episodes: 80

Production
- Executive producer: Ernesto Alonso
- Running time: 30 minutes

Original release
- Network: Telesistema Mexicano
- Release: 1971 – 1971

Related
- La maldición de la blonda; Mis tres amores; All About Eve (1950)

Las máscaras (English title:The masks) is a Mexican telenovela produced by Ernesto Alonso and transmitted by Telesistema Mexicano. The production is the original work of Argentinian author, Carlos Lozano Dana, and loosely based on the American film All About Eve.

Marga López and Joaquín Cordero starred as protagonists, Irán Eory starred as the main antagonist.

== Cast ==
- Marga López as Márgara
- Joaquín Cordero as Guillermo
- Irán Eory as Silvina Cruz
- Rita Macedo as Elena
- María Rubio as Ida Cruz
- José Alonso as Gaspar
- Luis Aragón as Zacarías
- Ofelia Medina as Delia
- Anita Blanch as Blanca
- César Castro as Inspector
- César del Campo
- Beatriz Sheridan
- Miguel Gómez Checa
