= Íngrid Martz =

Mexican actress

Ingrid Martz
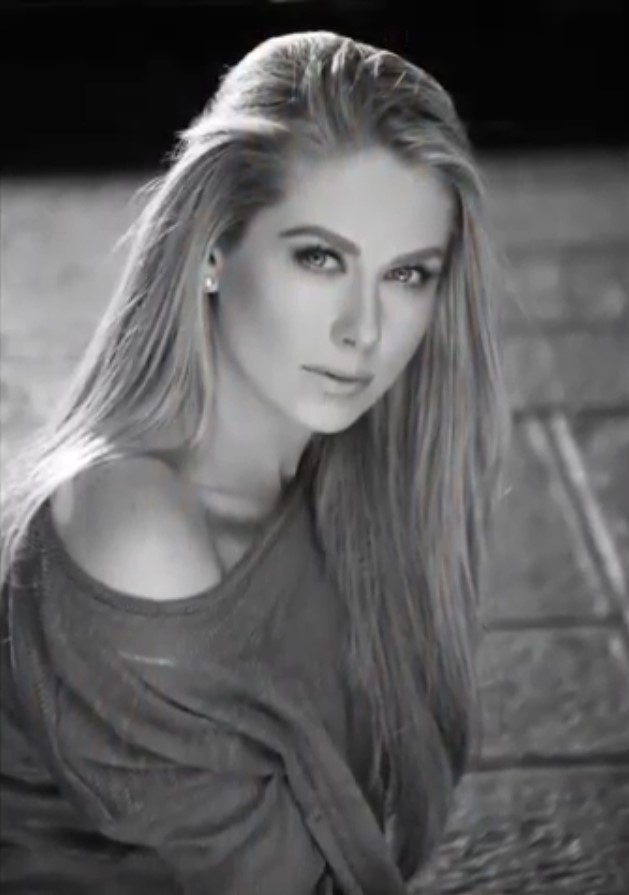
- Ingrid Martz in 2018
- Born: September 17, 1979 (age 46)
- Occupations: Actress; model
- Years active: 1990-present

Ingrid Martinez (Spanish pronunciation: [ˈiŋɡɾið ˈmaɾts]:born September 17, 1979) is a Mexican actress and model.

== Biography ==
Martz studied acting at El Centro de Capacitación Artística de Televisa (CEA). She appeared in La que no podía amar, a telenovela, as Daniella, Ana Paula's best friend and Miguel's wife.

Some of her credited works include Luz Clarita (1996), María Isabel (1997), Preciosa (1998), Salud, dinero y amor (1997), Mujeres engañadas (1999), Carita de ángel (2000), El derecho de nacer (2001), El juego de la vida (2001), Amor real (2003) and Amarte es mi Pecado (2004).

Besides acting in telenovelas, she has also starred in music videos and movies.

In 2004 she acted alongside Bárbara Mori in the hit telenovela, Rubí.

== Filmography ==
Television, films, guest appearances
Year	Title	Role	Notes
1990	Amor de nadie		Recurring role
1996	Me enamoro de ti with Fey		Video clip
1997-98	María Isabel	Gloria's friend	Recurring role
1997-98	Salud, dinero y amor	Ingrid Sandoval	Recurring role
1998	Preciosa	Alma San Román de Rivero	Recurring role
1999	La segunda noche	Director assistant	Film
1999	Inesperado Amor		Film
1999	Por tu amor	Paz Gallardo (young)	Guest star
1999-00	Mujeres engañadas	Adriana	Recurring role
1999-00	Cuento de Navidad	Invited in wrestling	Mini-series
2000-01	Carita de ángel	Doménica Rossi Rivero	Recurring role
2001	El derecho de nacer	Leonor Castro	Recurring role
2001-02	El juego de la vida	Georgina "Gina" Guzmán	Recurring role
2001	Mujer, Casos de la Vida Real		TV series
2003	Amor real	Pilar Piquet de Márquez	Recurring role
2004	Amarte es mi Pecado	Renata Quiroga	Recurring role
2004	Rubí	Lorena Treviño Rivero	Recurring role
2004	Vida TV		TV show
2004	Big Brother VIP: México	Herself/Guest	Reality Show
2005	Pablo y Andrea	Alma Ibáñez	Lead role
2005	Vecinos	Samantha Rosas	TV series
2006	RBD: La Familia		TV series
2006	Asi del precipicio	Hanna	Film
2006	Heridas de amor	Renata San Llorente de Aragón	Recurring role
2007-08	Tormenta en el paraíso	Karina Rosenberg/Valeria Ross "Sirenita"	Main role
2009	Tiempo Final 3	Adriana	TV series
2010	Zacatillo, un lugar en tu corazón	Karla Abreu Campos de Zárate	Lead role
2011-12	La que no podía amar	Daniela "Dany" Gutiérrez	Main role
2013	Corazón Indomable	Doris Montenegro	Recurring role
2013-14	Qué pobres tan ricos	Minerva Fontanet Blanco	Main role
2015-16	Antes muerta que Lichita	Luciana de Toledo y Mondragón	Main role
2017	Divina, está en tu corazón	Brisa	Main role
2017	3 familias	Bela Barroso	Lead role
2022	Mi camino es amarte	Martina	Guest star
2023	Vencer la culpa	Carmina	

=== Theater ===
- Busco al hombre de mi vida, marido ya tuve
- Chicas Católicas

== Awards and nominations ==
=== Premios TVyNovelas ===
Year	Category	Telenovela	Result
2007	Best Co-star Actress	Heridas de amor	Nominated
2017	Best Female Villain	"Antes muerta que Lichita"	Nominated
