= Mi primer amor =

Mexican telenovela

- Genre: Telenovela
- Created by: Original Story: Walter Negrão; Adaptation: Mimí Bechelani
- Directed by: Antulio Jiménez Pons
- Starring: Raúl Ramírez; Sonia Furió
- Opening theme: "Todo es amor" by José José
- Country of origin: Mexico
- Original language: Spanish

Production
- Executive producer: Antulio Jiménez Pons

Original release
- Network: Canal 8
- Release: 1973

Related
- O Primeiro Amor (1972)

Mi primer amor is a Mexican telenovela produced by Antulio Jiménez Pons for Televisa in 1973.

== Plot ==
Gerardo is a handsome teacher, a widower with four children, who arrives to Mexico City after a long time living away, to take over the management of a school. There María del Carmen, who has virtually taken over the school while awaiting the arrival of a new principal works. There also works as secretary Mauricio. Both are nervous about the arrival of new manager. However, the surprise of María del Carmen is capitalized when you discover that the director will be Gerardo, who was his childhood sweetheart and who has not seen a long time, until now. Gerardo is greeted kindly by Doña Julia, one of his old acquaintance who has two children: Hector and Elio.

== Cast ==
- Raúl Ramírez as Gerardo
- Sonia Furió as Paula
- Ofelia Guilmáin as Doña Julia
- María Douglas as Doña Virginia
- Gregorio Casal as Héctor
- Diana Bracho as Elena
- Carlos Piñar as Rafael
- Edith González as Lucía
- Celia Manzano as Doña Mercedes
- Rafael Baledón as Vicente
- Nadia Milton as Claudia
- Ana Martín as Baby
- Fernando Borges as Rudy
- Queta Lavat
