= Heridas de amor =

Mexican telenovela

- Genre: Telenovela; Romance; Drama
- Based on: Valeria y Maximiliano by Nora Alemán
- Written by: José Enrique Jiménez; Guillermo Quezada; María Auxilio Salado
- Directed by: Sergio Cataño
- Starring: Guy Ecker; Jacqueline Bracamontes; Sergio Sendel; Diana Bracho; Enrique Lizalde; Nuria Bages
- Theme music composer: Jorge Avendaño; Ricardo Montaner
- Opening theme: "Heridas de amor" by Ricardo Montaner
- Country of origin: Mexico
- Original language: Spanish
- No. of episodes: 130

Production
- Executive producer: Roberto Hernández
- Producer: Liliana Cuesta
- Production locations: Televisa San Ángel; Mexico City, Mexico; Tabasco (Tapijulapa, Comalcalco, Teapa), Mexico; Villahermosa, Mexico
- Cinematography: Carlos Sánchez Zúñiga; Armando Zafra
- Editors: Juan Franco; Luis Horacio Valdes
- Camera setup: Multi-camera
- Running time: 41-44 minutes
- Production company: Televisa

Original release
- Network: Canal de las Estrellas
- Release: April 3 – September 22, 2006

Heridas de amor (English: Wounds of Love) is a Mexican telenovela produced by Roberto Hernández for Televisa. It is a remake of the telenovela Valeria y Maximiliano. It premiered on April 3, 2006 and ended on September 22, 2006.

The telenovela stars Guy Ecker, Jacqueline Bracamontes, Sergio Sendel, Diana Bracho, Enrique Lizalde and Nuria Bages.

== Plot ==
Miranda San Llorente (Jacqueline Bracamontes) is a modern, firm and determined young woman who has everything in life: beauty, money and nobility. Her father, the millionaire Gonzalo San Llorente (Enrique Lizalde), places all his hopes in her, since, of his three daughters, she is the one who most resembles him in character and determination. Florencia (Karla Álvarez), the eldest, suffers from a heart condition that will inevitably lead her to death and the youngest, Renata (Íngrid Martz), is an immature and capricious teenager.

Miranda has her wedding prepared for when her fiancé, Fabricio Beltrán (José Luis Reséndez), who completed a doctorate in Germany, arrives. What Miranda ignores is that Fabricio is coming to marry, but not with her but with her sister, Florencia. Bertha de Aragón (Diana Bracho), Miranda's maternal aunt, caused love to emerge between Fabricio and Florencia to hurt Miranda, who has never allowed herself to be controlled or subjected to her false kindness. Bertha, furthermore, sees in Miranda the woman she hates the most: her own sister, Fernanda de Aragón (Nuria Bages).

Fabricio returns accompanied by his friend, Alejandro Luque (Guy Ecker), who wants revenge on Gonzalo for believing him to be the murderer of his father. Alejandro's conflict will be terrible when he meets Miranda, who will awaken love in him for the first time, a fact that opposes his desire for revenge. On her side, Miranda feels an inexplicable attraction towards him, which will cause a love-hate relationship between them where both will end up sweetly hurt.

Gonzalo's businesses go bankrupt due to the mismanagement of César (Sergio Sendel), Fabricio's brother and Bertha's accomplice. Gonzalo is sent to prison and Miranda must recover not only her fortune, but her entire family, including her mother, who left because of Bertha's scheming. Furthermore, Miranda and Alejandro will have to overcome the obstacles that César, who loves her, and Bertha, who falls in love with Alejandro from the first moment, put between them. In this fight of feelings and passions, of pride and power, both Miranda and Alejandro will discover that only those who produce them can heal the… Wounds of Love.

== Cast ==
=== Main ===
- Guy Ecker as Alejandro Luque Buenaventura
- Jacqueline Bracamontes as Miranda San Llorente de Aragón
- Sergio Sendel as César Beltrán Campuzano
- Diana Bracho as Bertha de Aragón
- Enrique Lizalde as Gonzalo San Llorente
- Nuria Bages as Fernanda de Aragón

=== Recurring ===
- Íngrid Martz as Renata San Llorente de Aragón
- Grettell Valdéz as Pamela Altamirano Villamil
- José Luis Reséndez as Fabricio Beltrán Campuzano
- Ernesto D'Alessio as Juan Jiménez García
- José Elías Moreno as Francisco Jiménez
- Beatriz Moreno as Amparo Jiménez
- Ricardo Blume as Leonardo Altamirano
- Lourdes Munguía as Daira Lemans
- Rosángela Balbó as Rebeca Campuzano Viuda de Beltrán
- Jan as Luciano Sartori
- Luis Couturier as Julio Bustamante
- María Prado as Tomasa Aguirre
- Héctor Sáez as Dr. Benjamín Cohen
- Hugo Macías Macotela as Father Santiago Buenaventura
- Luis Xavier as Román Álvarez
- Alicia del Lago as Natividad "Nati"
- Carlos Pérez as Elías "Sansón" Mondragón
- Frantz Cossío as Ángel Bustamante
- Haydée Navarra as Carola Molinar
- Karina Mora as Lizania Luque Lemans
- Lina Durán as Andrea Villamil
- Yéssica Salazar as Marisol
- Marcelo Córdoba as Daniel Bustamante
- Pablo Bracho as Luis Alberto Campos
- Paola Riquelme as Erika Duarte
- Rodrigo Tejeda as Raúl Jiménez García
- Rubén Morales as Vicente Mercado
- Susy-Lu as Verónica Ontiveros
- Toño Mora as Joel Jiménez García
- Vanessa Arias as Nuria Gómez
- Karla Álvarez as Florencia San Llorente de Aragón

=== Guest star ===
- Susana González as Liliana López Reyna

== Awards and nominations ==
Year	Award	Category	Nominee(s)	Result
2007	25th TVyNovelas Awards	Best Telenovela	Roberto Hernández	Nominated
2007	25th TVyNovelas Awards	Best Actress	Jacqueline Bracamontes	Nominated
2007	25th TVyNovelas Awards	Best Actor	Guy Ecker	Nominated
2007	25th TVyNovelas Awards	Best Antagonist Actor	Sergio Sendel	Nominated
2007	25th TVyNovelas Awards	Best Leading Actress	Diana Bracho	Nominated
2007	25th TVyNovelas Awards	Best Leading Actor	Enrique Lizalde	Nominated
2007	25th TVyNovelas Awards	Best Supporting Actress	Íngrid Martz	Nominated
2007	25th TVyNovelas Awards	Best Supporting Actress	Karla Álvarez	Nominated
2007	25th TVyNovelas Awards	Best Supporting Actor	José Luis Reséndez	Nominated
2007	25th TVyNovelas Awards	Best Musical Theme	"Heridas de amor" by Ricardo Montaner	Nominated
2007	25th TVyNovelas Awards	Best Direction	Sergio Cataño	Nominated
2007	Bravo Awards	Best Antagonist Actress	Diana Bracho	Won
