= El derecho de nacer (2001 TV series) =

- Genre: Telenovela; Romance; Drama
- Created by: Félix B. Caignet
- Written by: Fernanda Villeli; Marcela Fuentes Berain; Valentina Sánchez Villenave
- Directed by: Sergio Cataño
- Starring: Kate del Castillo; Saúl Lisazo; Diana Bracho; Carlos Bracho; Maite Embil; Sabine Moussier; Gabriela Goldsmith; Hugo Acosta; Jorge Antolín; Sergio Corona; David Ostrosky; Francis Laboriel
- Opening theme: Quisiera by Alejandro Fernández; Tantita pena (only in United States) by Alejandro Fernández
- Country of origin: Mexico
- Original language: Spanish
- No. of episodes: 80

Production
- Executive producer: Carlos Sotomayor
- Producer: Rafael Urióstegui
- Production locations: Filming; Televisa San Ángel; Mexico City, Mexico
- Cinematography: Carlos Sánchez Zúñiga
- Camera setup: Multi-camera
- Running time: 41-44 minutes
- Production company: Televisa

Original release
- Network: Canal de las Estrellas
- Release: February 5 – May 25, 2001

Related
- El derecho de nacer (1981-1982)

El derecho de nacer (English: The Right to Be Born) is a Mexican telenovela produced by Carlos Sotomayor for Televisa. It aired on Canal de las Estrellas from February 5, 2001 to May 25, 2001. It is a remake of the popular 1981 telenovela of the same name.

The series stars Kate del Castillo, Saúl Lisazo, Diana Bracho, Carlos Bracho, Maite Embil, Sabine Moussier, Gabriela Goldsmith, Hugo Acosta, Jorge Antolín, Sergio Corona, David Ostrosky and Francis Laboriel.

== Plot ==
El derecho de nacer tells the story of the del Junco family: Rafael (Carlos Bracho), a powerful man, a despot, and a male chauvinist; his wife Clemencia (Diana Bracho), who flees her reality with drugs; and their daughters María Elena (Kate del Castillo) and Matilde (Maite Embil), victims of their father's oppression.

Their father is, to the public, a pillar of society, but in secret gives free rein to his base instincts. María Elena is seduced by Alfredo Martínez (Hugo Acosta), a compulsive gambler who flees the city in order to escape his debts, leaving the minor pregnant. Upon finding out, Don Rafael tries to abort his daughter's child, but it's too late, so he sends her to his farm so that the baby will be born there.

Given María Elena's refusal to give the child up for adoption, her father orders his foreman to kill the newborn. María Dolores (Francis Laboriel), María Elena's faithful nanny, saves the little one and flees with him to Mexico City.

Don Rafael believes that the child has died, while María Elena dedicates her body and soul to searching for her little son with the help of Aldo Drigani (Saúl Lisazo), whom she later marries after he saves her from various conflicts. With many sacrifices, but with a mother's great love, María Dolores rears little Alberto (Miguel Ángel Biaggio) and educates him so that he will be a good man.

Thus, he becomes a brilliant physician who goes to Mérida, where he faces a past that he never suspected and a future he never pursued.

== Cast ==
- Kate del Castillo as María Elena del Junco Rivera
- Saúl Lisazo as Aldo Drigani
- Diana Bracho as Clemencia Rivera de del Junco
- Carlos Bracho as Rafael del Junco
- Maite Embil as Matilde del Junco Rivera de Armenteros
- Sabine Moussier as Graciela
- Gabriela Goldsmith as Adriana Drigani de Rivera
- Hugo Acosta as Alfredo Martínez
- Jorge Antolín as Jorge Luis Armenteros
- Sergio Corona as Manuel Puk
- David Ostrosky as José Rivera
- Francis Laboriel as María Dolores Limonta "Mamá Dolores"
- Irán Castillo as Isabel Cristina Armenteros del Junco
- Miguel Ángel Biaggio as Dr. Alberto Limonta
- Raúl Araiza as El Negro
- Verónica Jaspeado as Teté Puk de de la Reguera
- Ingrid Martz as Leonor Castro
- Mauricio Bonet as Eduardo
- Juan Ríos Cantu as Raúl
- Ehécatl Chávez as Bruno
- Zaide Silvia Gutiérrez as La Loba
- Paulina de Labra as Rosa
- Tony Bravo as Dr. Alejandro Sierra
- Audrey Vera as Angélica de la Reguera
- Jorge Consejo as Osvaldo Martínez
- Ricardo Schmall as Santiago
- Sergio Cataño as Carlos
- Daniel Rendón as Héctor
- Jorge Capin as Joe
- Linda Elizabeth as Jacinta
- Héctor Sánchez as El Mudo
- Adalberto Parra
- Karla Graham

== Awards and nominations ==
| Year | Award | Category | Nominee | Result |
|---|---|---|---|---|
| 2002 | El Heraldo de México Awards | Best Actress | Diana Bracho | Nominated |
