= Mis tres amores =

Mexican telenovela

- Genre: Telenovela; Romance; Drama
- Created by: Original Story; Alberto Migré; Adaptation; Ramon Zozaya
- Directed by: Antulio Jiménez Pons
- Starring: Nati Mistral; Narciso Busquets; Magda Guzmán; Anita Blanch; José Muñoz; Octavio Galindo
- Country of origin: Mexico
- Original language: Spanish
- No. of episodes: 120

Production
- Executive producer: David Antón
- Running time: 30 minutes

Original release
- Network: XEW-TV
- Release: 1971 – 1971

Related
- Las máscaras; Muchacha italiana viene a casarse

Mis tres amores (English title:My three loves) is a Mexican telenovela by Televisa produced by Ernesto Alonso and directed by Antulio Jiménez Pons.

== Cast ==
- Nati Mistral as Raquel
- Narciso Busquets as Sergio Montalvo
- Magda Guzmán as Consuelo
- Anita Blanch as Maria Mercedes
- Octavio Galindo as Cesar
- Dunia Saldívar as Clara
- Fernando Borges as Alex
- Olivia Michel as Adriana
- Enrique Novi as Lalo
- Armando Arriola as Don Fernando
- Lilia Aragón as Arlette
- Enrique Beraza as Ariel
- Manolo García as Mauricio
- Julio Lucena as Flavio
- Cristina Moreno as Leticia
- Juan Peláez as Uribe
