= Sí, mi amor (TV series) =

Mexican telenovela

- Genre: Telenovela
- Created by: Olga Ruilopez
- Written by: Oscar Lada Abbott
- Directed by: Enrique Segoviano
- Starring: Edith González; Leonardo Daniel; Luis Mario Quiroz; Nubia Marti; Gustavo Rojo
- Country of origin: Mexico
- Original language: Spanish
- No. of episodes: 30

Production
- Executive producer: Guillermo Diazayas

Original release
- Network: Canal de las Estrellas
- Release: August 27, 1984 – May 17, 1985

Related
- La hija de nadie (1982); El niño que vino del mar (1999)

Sí, mi amor (English title: Yes, my love) is a Mexican telenovela produced by Guillermo Diazayas for Televisa in 1984. Is a remake of the Venezuelan telenovela La hija de nadie produced by RCTV in 1982.

Edith González, Leonardo Daniel and Luis Mario Quiroz star as the protagonists, while Nubia Marti and Gustavo Rojo star as the antagonists.

== Cast ==
- Edith González as Susana
- Leonardo Daniel as David Kendall
- Luis Mario Quiroz as Carlos
- Nubia Marti as Constanza
- Gustavo Rojo as Sr. Williams
- Rafael Baledón as Capitán O'Hara
- Lucy Gallardo as Sra. Margot Williams
- Javier Marc as Heriberto
- Luis Miranda as Arnulfo
- Arturo Alegro as Don Ignacio
- Rosa María Moreno as Julia
- Renata Flores as Edith
- Tere Valadés as Sra. Tovar
- José Roberto Hill as Pablo
- Luis Avendaño as Victor
- Patsy as Liz
- Evangelina Martínez as Clotilde
- Alberto Trejo Juárez as Jarocho
- Silvia Manríquez as Leticia
- Socorro Bonilla as Alicia
- Felicia Mercado as Lady Simpson
- Sergio Orrante as Tano
- Carlos Enrique Torres as Pedro
- José Carlos Teruén as Paul
- José Dupeyrón as Mayordomo
