= Espejo de sombras =

Mexican telenovela

- Genre: Telenovela; Drama
- Starring: Ofelia Guilmáin; Andrea Palma; Sergio Bustamante
- Country of origin: Mexico
- Original language: Spanish

Production
- Executive producer: Ernesto Alonso
- Production locations: Mexico City, Mexico
- Running time: 42-45 minutes
- Production company: Televisa

Original release
- Network: Canal 4, Telesistema Mexicano
- Release: 1960 – 1960

Espejo de sombras is a Mexican telenovela that aired on Canal 4, Telesistema Mexicano in 1960.

== Cast ==
- Ofelia Guilmáin
- Andrea Palma
- Sergio Bustamante
- Adriana Roel
- Luis Lomelí
- Hortensia Santoveña
- Luis Bayardo
- Judy Ponte
- Aldo Monti
- Salvador Carrasco
