= Los miserables (1973 TV series) =

- Genre: Telenovela
- Created by: Edmundo Báe (adaptation)
- Based on: Les Misérables by Victor Hugo
- Directed by: Antulio Jiménez Pons
- Starring: Sergio Bustamante; Diana Bracho
- Country of origin: Mexico
- Original language: Spanish

Original release
- Network: Canal 13
- Release: February 21, 1974

Related
- Los miserables (2014)

Los miserables is a Mexican telenovela produced by Imevisión (now TV Azteca) for Canal 13 in 1974. It was led by Sergio Bustamante and Diana Bracho, and was based on Victor Hugo's 1862 novel, Les Misérables.

== Cast ==
- Sergio Bustamante as Jean Valjean
- Diana Bracho as Cosette
- Antonio Passy as Javert
- Magda Guzmán as Mrs. Thernardier
- Carlos Ancira as Thernardier
- María Rojo as Eponina
- Blanca Sánchez as Fantine
- Luis Torner as Mario
- Edith González as young Cosette
- Fernando Soler as Gillenormand
- Ángel Garasa as Bishop Myriel
- Alejandro Ciangherotti as Fauchelevent
- Marilú Elízaga as Senorita Gillenormand
- Alicia Palacios as Sor Perpetua
- Alicia Montoya as Mother Abbess
- Héctor Bonilla as Gerard (Enjolras)
- Raul Izaguirre as Teodulo
- Enrique Novi as Luis (Combeferre)
- Otto Sirgo as Felix Tholomyes
- Socorro Avelar as Celadora

== See also ==
- Adaptations of Les Misérables
