= Saúl Lisazo =

Mexican actor and ex-footballer (born 1956)

- Born: Saúl Gustavo Lisazo Oscoidi; June 1, 1956 (age 70); Buenos Aires, Argentina
- Occupation: Actor

Saúl Gustavo Lisazo Oscoidi (Spanish pronunciation: [saˈul liˈsaso]; born June 1, 1956, in Los Toldos, province of Buenos Aires in Argentina) is an Argentine-born Mexican actor and ex-footballer.

== Biography ==
Saúl Gustavo Lisazo Oscoidi is one of 6 siblings: Maria, Fernanda, Araceli, Alejandro, Mauricio, and Vanina. One event in his childhood that marked him was the death of his father when he was only 12 years old. Football is one of his passions; he started playing football with his father when he was a little boy and it grew to be his favorite sport and one that would take him to other countries around the world. In Spain, he met who would become the woman of his life, former model Mónica Viedma, whom he married. The pair has two kids, Paula, who was born on June 4, 1999, and Martin, born on November 11, 2003.

He played in Sarmiento for 10 years. He also played in Atlanta in Argentina, SK Beveren, where he won the Belgian League in 1979, and KV Mechelen in Belgium; and in Esporte Clube Juventude from Brazil. Saúl had to leave the sport but he tried to play in Barcelona until an injury in his knee forced him to leave it completely. In 1983, he decided to become a model.

In 1988, he started studying dramatic arts in Spain, at the academy of the Argentine actress Cristina Rotta. After two and a half years of preparation he had his first opportunity, in the movie "El Regreso a la Isla del Tesoro". During the early 1990s, Saúl flew to Mexico City, where he was the image of a very important liquor company which brought him international fame. Meanwhile, he acted in theater shows like "La Fierecilla Domada", "Tartufo," and others.

His first telenovela break came in 1990, when Mexican actress Lucía Méndez insisted that he be her partner in her new novela, "Amor de Nadie", which became a major hit across Latin America. After that he started in other telenovelas, such as "Acapulco, Cuerpo y Alma", and "La Jaula de Oro", among others. He also was in productions such as Tenias que ser Tu, Prisionera de Amor.

== Filmography ==
=== Films ===
Year	Title	Role	Notes
2007	To Rob a Thief	Moctesuma "Mocte" Valdez	Film debut
2011	El cártel de los sapos	Coronel Ramiro Gutiérrez	
2014	Quiero ser fiel	Mr. Gasmer	
2014	La dictadura perfecta	Javier Pérez Harris	

=== Television ===
Year	Title	Role	Notes
1990-1991	Amor de nadie	Luis	Lead role
1992-1993	Tenías que ser tú	Alejandro	Recurring role
1994	Prisionera de amor	José Armando Vidal	Lead role
1995	Bajo un mismo rostro	Teodorakis	Lead role; 100 episodes
1995-1996	Acapulco, cuerpo y alma	David	Lead role
1997	La jaula de oro	Alex Moncada / Franco	Lead role
1998	Vivo por Elena	Juan Alberto	Lead role
1999	El niño que vino del mar	Don Alfonso Cáceres de Ribera "Duque de Oriol"	Lead role
1999	Por tu amor	Marco Durán	Lead role
2001	El derecho de nacer	Aldo Drigani	Lead role
2004	Gitanas	Juan Domínguez	Main role
2006	Tierra de pasiones	Francisco Contreras	Lead role
2007-2008	Mientras haya vida	Héctor Cervantes	Lead role
2008-2010	Capadocia	Procurador Javier Cordova	6 episodes
2010	El Clon	Leonardo Ferrer	Main role
2011	El octavo mandamiento	Julián San Millán	Lead role
2012-2013	El rostro de la venganza	Ezequiel Alvarado	Main role
2014	Siempre tuya Acapulco	Himself	
2014-2015	Las Bravo	Enrique Velázquez	Main role
2015	Señorita Pólvora	Octavio Cárdenas	7 episodes
2019	Betty en NY	Roberto Mendoza	Main role
2024	Marea de pasiones	Alejandro Grajales	
2024	Sed de venganza	Alfredo del Pino	
