= Ambición (TV series) =

Mexican telenovela

- Genre: Telenovela
- Created by: Inés Rodena; Carlos Romero
- Directed by: Rafael Banquells; Fernando Chacón
- Starring: Julieta Bracho; Rafael Baledón
- Country of origin: Mexico
- Original language: Spanish
- No. of episodes: 20

Production
- Executive producer: Valentín Pimstein
- Running time: 30 minutes

Original release
- Network: Canal de las Estrellas
- Release: 1980

Related
- Ambición (1973)

Ambición (English title: Ambition) is a Mexican telenovela produced by Valentín Pimstein for Televisa in 1980.

== Cast ==
- Julieta Bracho
- Rafael Baledón
- Edith González as Charito
- Raymundo Capetillo
- Leonardo Daniel
- Gregorio Casals
- Erika Buenfil
- Beatriz Aguirre
- Ada Carrasco
