= Historia de un amor (TV series) =

1971 Mexican telenovela

- Genre: Telenovela; Drama
- Directed by: Manolo García
- Starring: Jorge Mistral; María Elena Marqués; Fernando Mendoza
- Country of origin: Mexico
- Original language: Spanish
- No. of episodes: 30

Production
- Running time: 30 minutes

Original release
- Network: Telesistema Mexicano
- Release: 1971 – 1971

Related
- El derecho de los hijos; Lucía Sombra

Historia de un amor (English title:Story of a Love) is a Mexican telenovela produced and transmitted by Telesistema Mexicano.

== Cast ==
- Jorge Mistral
- María Elena Marqués
- Fernando Mendoza
- Miguel Manzano
- Luis Gimeno
- Karina Duprez
