= Karla Álvarez =

Mexican actress (1972–2013)

- Born: Karla Mercedes Álvarez Báez; 15 October 1972; Mexico City, Mexico
- Died: 15 November 2013 (aged 41); Mexico City, Mexico
- Occupation: Actress
- Years active: 1992–2013
- Spouses: Alexis Ayala (m. 1994; div. 1995) Antonio D’Agostino (m. 2004)

Karla Álvarez (Spanish pronunciation: [ˈkaɾla ˈalβaɾes]; 15 October 1972 – 15 November 2013) was a Mexican actress best known for her roles including Maria Mercedes and Alma Rebelde and as a contestant for Big Brother VIP in 2003. Her last TV appearance was Qué Bonito Amor just before her death.

== Personal life ==
In 1994 she was married to actor Alexis Ayala and in 1995 they announced their separation. She remarried to Antonino D'Agostino.

== Death ==
Álvarez was found dead on 15 November 2013 at her apartment due to respiratory failure caused by pneumonia. Álvarez was rumored to have suffered from alcoholism and allegedly had an eating disorder. She also had an illness. It was the aforementioned illness that caused the death.

== Filmography ==
Telenovelas, Series, Films, Theater
Year	Title	Role	Notes
1992–1993	María Mercedes	Rosario Múñoz González	Co-Protagonist
1993–1994	Buscando el paraíso	Andrea	Main Antagonist
1994	Prisionera de amor	Karina Monasterios	Co-Protagonist
1994	Engáñame si puedes		Theatrical Performance
1994–1995	Agujetas de color de rosa	Isabel	Special Appearance
1995–1996	Acapulco, cuerpo y alma	Julia García	Co-Protagonist
1996–1997	Mi querida Isabel	Isabel Rivas	Protagonist
1996–1997	Mujer, casos de la vida real		3 Episodes
1998	La Mentira	Virginia Fernández-Negrete de Fernández-Negrete	Main Antagonist
1999	Alma rebelde	Rita Álvarez	Main Antagonist
1999-00	Mujeres engañadas	Sonia Arteaga	Supporting Role
1999-00	Cuento de Navidad	Miriam	Mini-series
2001	La intrusa	Violeta Junquera Brito	Antagonist
2002	La Casa de los Líos		Theatrical Performance
2002–2003	¡Vivan los niños!	Jacinta	Antagonist
2004	Día de perros	Herself	
2004–2005	Inocente de Ti	Aurora	Antagonist
2006	Heridas de amor	Florencia San Llorente de Aragon de Beltrán	Antagonist
2006	Big Brother VIP 2	Herself	Eliminated 9th
2007	Incógnito	Herself	1 Episode
2007	La santa muerte	Rubí	Film
2008	Las tontas no van al cielo	Paulina "Pau" Cervantes de López Carmona	Main Antagonist
2008–2009	Un gancho al corazón	Regina	Antagonist
2009–2010	Camaleones	Prefecta Ágatha Menéndez	Antagonist
2011	Como dice el dicho	Susana	1 Episode
2012–2013	Qué bonito amor	Irasema	Co-Protagonist

== Awards and nominations ==
Year	Award	Category	Telenovela	Result
1995	TVyNovelas Awards	Best Young Lead Actress	Prisionera de amor	Nominated
1998	TVyNovelas Awards	Best Female Revelation	Mi querida Isabel	Nominated
1999	TVyNovelas Awards	Best Female Antagonist	La Mentira	Nominated
2007	TVyNovelas Awards	Best Co-star Actress	Heridas de amor	Nominated
