= Guy Ecker =

American actor

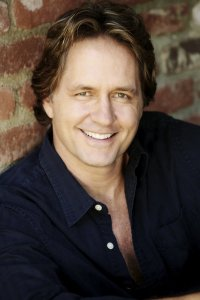
- Born: Guy Frederick Ecker; February 9, 1959 (age 67); São Paulo, Brazil
- Education: University of Texas at Austin
- Occupation: Actor
- Years active: 1986–present
- Spouses: Nia Peeples (m. 1984; div. 1986) Estela Sainz (m. 2000)
- Children: 4, including Jon-Michael Ecker

Guy Frederick Ecker (born February 9, 1959) is an American actor.

Born in Brazil to American parents, Ecker became a household name in Latin America for his portrayal of Sebastián Vallejo in the Colombian telenovela Café, con aroma de mujer. A second Colombian production, Guajira also proved successful. In 1998, he moved to Mexico and won his first leading role in a Mexican telenovela, playing opposite Kate del Castillo in the telenovela La Mentira, which also became a huge success. Leading roles in Salomé and Heridas de amor followed. American viewers may be familiar with him through his work on the television show Las Vegas as Detective Luis Perez.

== Biography ==
Guy Ecker was born in São Paulo. He is the third out of five children (three girls, two boys) of American parents Marion and Bob Ecker. His father was a businessman, originally from Wisconsin, who worked for several multinational companies and, during his childhood, Ecker also lived in Colombia, Venezuela and Mexico.

As a child, Ecker participated in various plays and talent shows. He moved to the United States to attend college at the University of Texas in Austin. He earned a degree in International Business. A few years after graduating, he realized his true passion was acting. One of his earliest acting jobs included juggling eggs on a McDonald's commercial.

On June 24, 2013, it was confirmed that Guy Ecker (along with Susana González) would star as the protagonist in the Mexican telenovela Por siempre mi amor.

In 2015 he starred with Julián Gil in Miller Lite's Rivales ad campaign.

== Personal life ==
He was married to actress Nia Peeples from 1984 to 1986. In 2000, he married the actress Estela Sainz. The couple has three children. He has a son, Jon-Michael Ecker, from a previous relationship.

== Filmography ==
- 1986: Blood Money aka Dinero Sangre DVD [2002] United States [Amazon.com]

Television roles
Year	Title	Role	Notes
1994	Café, con aroma de mujer	Sebastián Vallejo Cortez	
1996	Guajira	Helmut Heidenberg	
1998	La mentira	Demetrio Azúnsolo	
2001	Salomé	Julio	
2003-2005	Las Vegas	Detective Luis Perez	12 episodes
2006	Heridas de amor	Alejandro Luque Buenaventura	
2010	Eva Luna	Daniel Villanueva	
2011-2012	Corazón apasionado	Armando Marcano	
2012	Rosario	Alejandro Montalbán	
2013-2014	Por siempre mi amor	Arturo de la Riva	
2018-2020	El Senor de los Cielos	Joe Navarro	
2018	El Recluso	John Morris	
2021-2022	Parientes a la fuerza	George Cruz	

=== Webnovelas ===
- 2009: Vidas Cruzadas .... Daniel
