= TVyNovelas Award for Best Comedic Performance =

Mexican television award

- Awarded for: Best performance by an actor or actress in a comedian role
- First award: 1983; Rodolfo Rodríguez; Cachún cachún ra ra! Lucila Mariscal; La Carabina de Ambrosio
- Currently held by: 2007; Arath de la Torre; La parodia

== Winners and nominees ==
=== 1980s ===
Winner	Nominated
1st TVyNovelas Awards
Rodolfo Rodríguez for Cachún cachún ra ra! and Lucila Mariscal for La Carabina de Ambrosio	
2nd TVyNovelas Awards
Gualberto Castro for La Carabina de Ambrosio and Lupita Sandoval for Venustiana	
3rd TVyNovelas Awards
Pompín Iglesias for Mi secretaria, Chela Castro for No empujen, Ernesto Laguardia for Cachún cachún ra ra! and Alicia Sandoval for Venustiana	
4th TVyNovelas Awards
Luis de Alba and Maribel Fernández for La Carabina de Ambrosio and María Elena Saldaña for Salón de belleza	Flor Trujillo for Mi secretaria; Lázara for Chispas de chocolate; Olivia Collins for No empujen; Alfredo Alegría for Las aventuras de Lenguardo; Roberto Gómez Bolaños for El Chavo del Ocho; Pompín Iglesias for Mi secretaria; Chela Castro for No empujen; Florinda Meza for El Chavo del Ocho; María Antonieta de las Nieves for El Chavo del Ocho
5th TVyNovelas Awards
Chespirito for El Chavo del Ocho	Héctor Suárez for ¿Qué nos pasa?; Jorge Ortiz de Pinedo for Qué lío con este trío; José Magaña for Cachún cachún ra ra!; Raúl "Chato" Padilla for Chespirito
6th TVyNovelas Awards
Jorge Ortiz de Pinedo and María Luisa Alcalá for Dr. Cándido Pérez	
7th TVyNovelas Awards
Jorge Ortiz de Pinedo for Dr. Cándido Pérez, César Costa for Papá soltero and Anabel Ferreira for ¡Anabel!	

=== 1990s ===
Winner	Nominated
8th TVyNovelas Awards
Jorge Ortiz de Pinedo for Dr. Cándido Pérez and Anabel Ferreira for ¡Anabel!	
9th TVyNovelas Awards
Roberto Gomez Bolaños for Chespirito and Anabel Ferreira for ¡Anabel!	Alejandra Meyer for Dr. Cándido Pérez; Florinda Meza for Chespirito; María Alicia Delgado for ¡Anabel!; María Elena Saldaña for ¡Ándale!; Carlos Ignacio for ¡Anabel!; Édgar Vivar for Chespirito; Eugenio Derbez for ¡Anabel!; Jorge Ortiz de Pinedo for Dr. Cándido Pérez
10th TVyNovelas Awards
Eugenio Derbez and Anabel Ferreira for ¡Anabel!	
11th TVyNovelas Awards
Jorge Ortiz de Pinedo for Dr. Cándido Pérez and Anabel Ferreira for ¡Anabel!	Florinda Meza for Chespirito; María Alicia Delgado for ¡Anabel!; María Antonieta de las Nieves for Chespirito; María Elena Saldaña for Todo de todo; Alejandro Suárez for Todo de todo; Édgar Vivar for Chespirito; Eugenio Derbez for ¡Anabel!; Roberto Gómez Bolaños for Chespirito
12th TVyNovelas Awards
Maribel Fernández for Hasta que la muerte los separe	Lucila Mariscal for Las aventuras de Lencha; María Alicia Delgado for ¡Anabel!
13th TVyNovelas Awards
Eugenio Derbez for Al derecho y al derbez	
~~1996 to 1998~~
17th TVyNovelas Awards
Eugenio Derbez for Derbez en cuando	

=== 2000s ===
Winner	Nominated
~~2000~~
19th TVyNovelas Awards
Eugenio Derbez for Derbez en cuando and Consuelo Duval for La hora pico	
20th TVyNovelas Awards
Jorge Ortiz de Pinedo for Cero en conducta and Consuelo Duval for La hora pico	
21st TVyNovelas Awards
Miguel Galván and Adrián Uribe for La hora pico, Arath de la Torre for La parodia and Angélica Vale and Raquel Garza for La oreja	
~~2004 to 2006~~
25th TVyNovelas Awards
Arath de la Torre for La parodia and Consuelo Duval for La hora pico	Adrián Uribe forLa hora pico; Freddy Ortega and Germán Ortega forLa parodia; Raúl Araiza forAmor mío; Yordi Rosado for Otro Rollo; Ana Bertha Espín forVecinos; Mayrín Villanueva forVecinos; Roxana Castellanos forLa parodia; Vanessa Guzmán forAmor mío

== Records ==
- Most awarded actors: Anabel Ferreira and Jorge Ortiz de Pinedo, 5 times.
- Most awarded actress (ever winner): Anabel Ferreira, 5 times.
- Most nominated actor: Jorge Ortiz de Pinedo with 6 nominations.
- Most nominated actress without a win: Florinda Meza with 3 nominations.
- Youngest winner: María Elena Saldaña, 23 years old.
- Youngest nominee: María Antonieta de las Nieves, 36 years old.
- Oldest winner: Roberto Gómez Bolaños, 62 years old.
- Oldest nominees: Raúl "Chato" Padilla, 69 years old.
- Actress winning after short time: Anabel Ferreira (1989, 1990, 1991, 1992 and 1993), 5 consecutive years.
- Actress winning after long time: Maribel Fernández by (La carabina de Ambrosio, 1986) and (Hasta que la muerte nos separe, 1994), 8 years difference.
- Foreign winning actor: Pompín Iglesias from Colombia.
