= TVyNovelas Award for Best Comedy Program =

Mexican television award

- Awarded for: Best comedian program
- First award: 1983; Cachún cachún ra ra!
- Currently held by: 2020; Nosotros los guapos

== Winners and nominees ==
=== 1980s ===
Winner	Nominated
1st TVyNovelas Awards
Cachún cachún ra ra! by Luis de Llano Macedo and Marco Flavio Cruz	
2nd TVyNovelas Awards
Cachún cachún ra ra! by Luis de Llano Macedo and Marco Flavio Cruz	
3rd TVyNovelas Awards
Cachún cachún ra ra! by Luis de Llano Macedo and Marco Flavio Cruz	
4th TVyNovelas Awards
La carabina de Ambrosio by Humberto Navarro	El Chavo del Ocho by Roberto Gómez Bolaños; No empujen; Salón de Belleza
5th TVyNovelas Awards
Chespirito by Roberto Gómez Bolaños and Cachún cachún ra ra! by Luis de Llano Macedo and Marco Flavio Cruz	Qué lío con este trío by Jorge Ortiz de Pinedo; ¿Qué nos pasa? by Héctor Suárez
6th TVyNovelas Awards
Dr. Cándido Pérez by Jorge Ortiz de Pinedo and Roberto Gómez Fernández	
7th TVyNovelas Awards
Dr. Cándido Pérez by Jorge Ortiz de Pinedo and Roberto Gómez Fernández	

=== 1990s ===
Winner	Nominated
8th TVyNovelas Awards
Los comediantes by Jorge Ortiz de Pinedo	
9th TVyNovelas Awards
!Anabel¡ by Enrique Segoviano	Chespirito by Roberto Gómez Bolaños; Dr. Cándido Pérez by Jorge Ortiz de Pinedo; Los comediantes by Jorge Ortiz de Pinedo; Papá soltero by Luis de Llano Macedo
10th TVyNovelas Awards
!Anabel¡ by Enrique Segoviano	
11th TVyNovelas Awards
Todo de todo by Juan Osorio	!Anabel¡ by Enrique Segoviano; Chespirito by Roberto Gómez Bolaños; Dr. Cándido Pérez by Jorge Ortiz de Pinedo; Papá soltero by Luis de Llano Macedo
~~1994 to 1999~~

=== 2000s ===
Winner	Nominated
18th TVyNovelas Awards
Derbez en cuando by Eugenio Derbez	
~~2001~~
20th TVyNovelas Awards
Cero en conducta by Jorge Ortiz de Pinedo	
21st TVyNovelas Awards
La Parodia by Carla Estrada and Reynaldo López	
22nd TVyNovelas Awards
La familia P. Luche by Eugenio Derbez	La Escuelita VIP by Jorge Ortiz de Pinedo and Luigina Tuccio; La hora pico by Carla Estrada and Reynaldo López
23rd TVyNovelas Awards
La hora pico by Reynaldo López	La escuelita VIP by Jorge Ortiz de Pinedo and Luigina Tuccio; Par de Ases by Jorge Ortiz de Pinedo and Luigina Tuccio
24th TVyNovelas Awards
El Privilegio de Mandar by Carla Estrada and Reynaldo López	La hora pico by Carla Estrada and Reynaldo López; Mujer, casos de la vida real by Silvia Pinal; Vecinos by Eugenio Derbez and Elias Solorio
25th TVyNovelas Awards
Amor mío by Roberto Gómez Fernández and Giselle González	El Privilegio de Mandar by Carla Estrada and Reynaldo López; La hora pico by Carla Estrada and Reynaldo López; Vecinos by Eugenio Derbez and Elias Solorio
26th TVyNovelas Awards
La familia P. Luche by Eugenio Derbez and Elias Solorio	Amor mío by Roberto Gómez Fernández and Giselle González; Una Familia de 10 by Jorge Ortiz de Pinedo and Pedro Ortiz de Pinedo; Vecinos by Eugenio Derbez and Elias Solorio
~~2009~~

=== 2010s ===
Indicates the winner

Year	Program	Producer	Ref
~~2010 to 2016~~
2017 (35th)	Nosotros los guapos	Guillermo del Bosque	
2017 (35th)	40 y 20	Gustavo Loza	
2017 (35th)	Burócatas	Israel Jaitovich	
2017 (35th)	Doble sentido	Israel Jaitovich	
2018 (36th)	Vecinos	Elías Solorio	
2018 (36th)	40 y 20	Gustavo Loza	
2018 (36th)	Mita y mita	Pitipol Ybarra	
2018 (36th)	Nosotros los guapos	Guillermo del Bosque	
2018 (36th)	Renta congelada	Pedro Ortiz de Pinedo	
2019 (37th)	Nosotros los guapos	Guillermo del Bosque	
2019 (37th)	40 y 20	Gustavo Loza	
2019 (37th)	La parodia	Reynaldo Lopez	
2019 (37th)	Simón dice	Pedro Ortiz de Pinedo	
2019 (37th)	Vecinos	Elías Solorio	

=== 2020s ===
Indicates the winner

Year	Program	Producer	Ref
2020 (38th)	Nosotros los guapos	Guillermo del Bosque	
2020 (38th)	La parodia	Reynaldo Lopez	
2020 (38th)	Simón dice	Pedro Ortiz de Pinedo	
2020 (38th)	Vecinos	Elías Solorio	
2020 (38th)	Una familia de diez	Pedro Ortiz de Pinedo	

== Records ==
- Most awarded comedy program: Cachún cachún ra ra!, 4 times.
- Most nominated comedy program: Vecinos with 6 nominations.
- Most nominated comedy program without a win: 40 y 20 with 3 nominations.
- Comedy program winning after short time: Cachún cachún ra ra! (1983, 1984 and 1985), 3 consecutive years.
- Comedy program winning after long time: La familia P. Luche (2004 and 2008), 4 years difference.
