= TVyNovelas Award for Best Variety Program =

Television recognition of excellence

- Awarded for: Best weekly TV show
- First award: 1983; XE-TU
- Currently held by: 2018; Hoy

The TVyNovelas Award for Best Variety Program is presented annually by Televisa and the magazine TVyNovelas to honor the best Mexican television productions, including telenovelas. The award ceremony rotates between Mexico City and Acapulco.

== Winners and nominees ==
=== 1980s ===
Winner	Nominated
1st TVyNovelas Awards
XE-TU	
2nd TVyNovelas Awards
Siempre en Domingo	
3rd TVyNovelas Awards
Siempre en Domingo	En Familia con Chabelo
4th TVyNovelas Awards
Siempre en Domingo	En vivo; Vídeo éxitos; XE-TU
5th TVyNovelas Awards
Siempre en Domingo	El mundo del espectáculo; Vídeo éxitos; XE-TU
6th TVyNovelas Awards
Siempre en Domingo	
7th TVyNovelas Awards
Siempre en Domingo	

=== 1990s ===
Winner	Nominated
8th TVyNovelas Awards
Siempre en Domingo	
9th TVyNovelas Awards
Siempre en Domingo	Estrellas de los 90; Galardón a los grandes; Noche de valores; Los super especiales
10th TVyNovelas Awards
Siempre en Domingo	
11th TVyNovelas Awards
Siempre en Domingo	¡Ándale!; El sabor de la noche; Noche de valores; Y Veró América... ¡Va!
12th TVyNovelas Awards
Siempre en Domingo	Llévatelo
~~1995 to 1999~~

=== 2000s ===
Winner	Nominated
~~2000~~
19th TVyNovelas Awards
Otro Rollo	
~~2002~~
21st TVyNovelas Awards
Otro Rollo	Operación Triunfo
~~2004~~
23rd TVyNovelas Awards
La parodia	Otro Rollo; Hoy
24th TVyNovelas Awards
La parodia	Hoy; La oreja; Otro Rollo
25th TVyNovelas Awards
La parodia	Hoy; ¡Muévete!; Nuestra casa; Otro Rollo
26th TVyNovelas Awards
Hoy	¡Muévete!; Viva la mañana
27th TVyNovelas Awards
Desmadruga2	Cuanto quieres perder; Hoy; TV de noche

=== 2010s ===
Winner	Nominated
28th TVyNovelas Awards
100 mexicanos dijeron	Hoy; Resbalón; 12 Corazones
29th TVyNovelas Awards
Hoy	Desmadruga2; Se Vale
30th TVyNovelas Awards
Hoy	Sabadazo; Se Vale
31st TVyNovelas Awards
Hoy	Los Doctores; Sabadazo
32nd TVyNovelas Awards
Hoy	Una noche con Yuri; Estrella2
33rd TVyNovelas Awards
Hoy	Estrella2; Sabadazo
34th TVyNovelas Awards
Hoy	Adal "El Show"; Estrella2; Sabadazo
35th TVyNovelas Awards
Hoy	Cuéntamelo ya; El Coque va; El juego de las estrellas; Recuerda y Gana
36th TVyNovelas Awards
Hoy	Cuéntamelo ya; El Coque va

== Records ==
- Most awarded program: Siempre en Domingo, 11 times.
- Most awarded program (ever winner): Siempre en Domingo, 11 times.
- Most nominated program: Siempre en Domingo with 11 nominations.
- Most nominated program without a win: Sabadazo with 4 nominations.
- Program winning after short time: Siempre en Domingo, 11 consecutive years.
