= Amy, la niña de la mochila azul =

Mexican telenovela

- Genre: Telenovela
- Created by: Rubén Galindo
- Directed by: Alejandro Frutos Maza; Roberto Sosa
- Starring: Eduardo Capetillo; Nora Salinas; Pedro Armendáriz Jr.; Alejandro Tommasi; Tatiana; Danna Paola; Joseph Sasson; Alejandra Meyer; Alejandra Procuna; Lorena Herrera
- Theme music composer: Irina Ivanott; Marco Vinci
- Opening theme: "Azul como el cielo" by Tatiana and Danna Paola
- Country of origin: Mexico
- Original language: Spanish
- No. of episodes: 115

Production
- Producers: Rubén Galindo; Santiago Galindo
- Production locations: Chetumal and Bacalar, Quintana Roo
- Production company: Televisa

Original release
- Network: Canal de las Estrellas
- Release: 23 February – 30 July 2004

Amy, la niña de la mochila azul (English: Amy, the Girl with the Blue Backpack) is a Mexican telenovela produced by Televisa in 2004. The telenovela is an adaptation on the 1979 film La niña de la mochila azul. It stars Danna Paola, Nora Salinas and Eduardo Capetillo, while Pedro Armendáriz Jr. and Tatiana star as co-protagonists with Alejandro Tommasi, Lorena Herrera, Alejandra Meyer, Manuel Landeta and Alejandra Procuna as antagonists.

== Plot ==
As a baby, Amy was rescued from the sea by Captain Matías and his wife Perla. While out at sea aboard one of Matías' ships, the three of them were surprised by a heavy storm. During the chaos, Perla slipped off the deck and fell into the sea, leaving Amy and Matias on their own. Since then, Matías became afraid of the sea to the point that he never went fishing again. Over time, Amy has grown up to be a mischievous and daring girl who works to help support her father because he doesn't have a proper job, and everything is going well in her life until the arrival of Minerva, who is looking for orphans for the San Felipe orphanage under the orders of Prefect Carlota, who needs more children to keep receiving donations.

Carlota has never loved the orphans and uses the donations to achieve her own goal: to have the largest jewelry collection in the world. As a child, Minerva was a victim of Carlota, who stole her childhood. Since then, Minerva is a bitter woman and her childhood has turned into a ghost girl who cries locked in the highest tower of the orphanage castle waiting for the day when someone can rescue her.

Raúl arrives in Puerto Esperanza since his father was transferred to fix up an abandoned locomotive called "La Vieja Lola". Raúl meets Amy and believes she is a boy, due to her dressing like a sailor, but later learns that she is actually a girl and falls in love with her. Meanwhile, Octavio Betancourt, a millionaire suffering from a serious illness, arrives in town with the desire to find his son who was lost 8 years ago. What Octavio doesn't know is that he actually had a daughter, and it's Amy.

A short time later, Minerva manages to take Amy to San Felipe, leaving everyone sad and greatly missing her. Upon arriving at the orphanage, Amy discovers that her mission is to fight against Carlota's evil, and thus rescue the orphans and Minerva herself; but Amy is not alone: she has her friend Coral, a Mermaid who guides her along the way, towards the "five paths of light".

== Cast ==
- Eduardo Capetillo as Octavio Betancourt
- Nora Salinas as Emilia Álvarez-Vega
- Lorena Herrera as Leonora Rivas
- Danna Paola as Amy Granados
- Joseph Sasson as Raúl Hinojosa
- Tatiana as Coral / Marina
- Pedro Armendáriz Jr. as Capitán Matías Granados
- Alejandro Tommasi as Claudio Rosales
- Alejandra Meyer as La Prefecta Carlota
- Harry Geithner as César
- Alejandra Procuna as Minerva Camargo
- Carlos Speitzer as Adrian González "El Gato"
- Álex Perea as German Rosales "Chayote"
- Geraldine Galván as Mary Loly Álvarez-Vega
- Nicole Durazo as Mary Pily Álvarez-Vega
- Luciano Corigliano as Paulino Rosales "Pecas"
- Alejandro Speitzer as Tolín
- Christopher Uckermann as Rolando
- Grisel Margarita as Carolina
- Sharis Cid as Angélica Hinojosa #1
- Yolanda Ventura as Angélica Hinojosa #2
- David Ostrosky as Sebastián
- Fabián Robles as Bruno
- Felicidad Aveleyra as Alma
- Manuel Landeta as Tritón
- Raúl Padilla as Gerónimo
- Manuel Valdés as Marcelo
- María Luisa Alcalá as Virginia Castro
- Juan Verduzco as Román
- Lucero Lander as Perla de Granados
- Rosángela Balbó as Perpetua de Beatancourt
- Ricardo de Pascual as Dagoberto
- Isabel Molina as Mercedes
- María Fernanda Sasian as Mini
- Lilibeth Flores as Luly
- Greta Cervantes as Ghost Girl/Minerva (young)
- Génesis Romo as Angel child
- Carlos Colin as Marcial Álvarez-Vega
- Juan Carlos Flores as Fabián
- Rossana San Juan as Soledad
- Alejandro Villeli as Barracuda
- Kathy Castro as Alicia
- Álvaro Carcaño as Jacinto
- Héctor Cruz as Roberto
- Jorge Ortín as Manuel
- Jorge Trejo as Pacoco
- Julio Vega as Melesio
- Levi Nájera as René
- Luis Fernando Madriz as Walter
- Moisés Suárez as Benigno
- Ricky Mergold as Plutarco
- Roberto Munguía as Ramiro
- Roberto Ruy as Juvenal
- Ricardo Kleinbaum as Mauro
- Sandra Destenave as Graciela
- Raúl Sebastián as Chacho
- Karen Sandoval as Valeria
- Miguel Pérez as Uri
- María Prado as La Carcelera

== Production ==
Filming took place from 2 November 2003 to July 2004.

== Music ==
=== Volume 1 ===
Amy, la niña de la mochila azul Vol. 1

Soundtrack album by Cast of Amy, la niña de la mochila azul
- Released: 19 February 2004 (Mexico); 28 September 2004 (United States)
- Length: 35:35
- Label: Universal Music México

The first soundtrack of the telenovela was released on 19 February 2004. The soundtrack was certified gold in Mexico.

No.	Title	Writer(s)	Artist(s)	Length
1.	"Azul Como El Cielo"	Irina Ivanott; Marco Vinci	Danna Paola; Tatiana	3:36
2.	"La De La Mochila Azul"	Bulmaro Bermúdez	Luis Fernando Madriz Torres	2:53
3.	"Mi Capitán"	Alejandro Ramos	Danna Paola	2:44
4.	"Reconstruyamos El Bucanero"	Ramos	Cast of Amy, la niña de la mochila azul	2:54
5.	"Cazadores De Tesoros"	Ramos	Luis Fernando Madriz Torres	1:27
6.	"Hija del Mar"	Carlos Vargas; Gerardo Angeles	Tatiana	3:19
7.	"Una Señal"	Alejandro de la Parra; Julián Ramírez; Rodrigo Sieres	Danna Paola	2:51
8.	"Piratas Del Risco"	De la Parra; Ramírez; Sieres	Carlos Colín; Ricky Mergold; Luis Fernando Madriz Torres	2:12
9.	"Valiente"	Ivanott; Vinci	Danna Paola	3:28
10.	"¡¡¡Minerva, No Te La Lleves!!!"	Vargas; Angeles; Mauricio Aziz	Kathy Castro; Lilibeth; Greta Cervantes; María Fernanda Sasian; Jorge Trejo	2:32
11.	"Amy, Amy"	Vargas; Aziz	Danna Paola	2:03
12.	"Amor De Niños"	Reyli Barba Arrocha	Lilibeth; Danna Paola	3:22
13.	"El Mapa Del Tesoro"	Ramos	Cast of Amy, la niña de la mochila azul	2:08
Total length:				35:35

=== Volume 2 ===
Amy, la niña de la mochila azul Vol. 2

Soundtrack album by Cast of Amy, la niña de la mochila azul
- Released: 2 April 2004 (Mexico); 26 October 2004 (United States)
- Length: 42:33
- Label: Universal Music México

The second soundtrack of the telenovela was released on 2 April 2004. Like the first soundtrack, it was certified gold in Mexico.

No.	Title	Writer(s)	Artist(s)	Length
1.	"Caminos de Luz"	Alfredo M.R.; Irina Ivanott	Danna Paola; Tatiana	3:40
2.	"Ritual De Iniciación"	Alejandro de la Parra; Julián Ramírez; Rodrigo Sieres	Luis Fernando Madriz Torres	1:54
3.	"Se Busca Una Mirada"	Carlos Vargas; Gerardo Angeles; Mauricio Aziz	Luis Fernando Madriz Torres	2:45
4.	"El Tiburón Chimuelo"	Alejandro Ramos	Luis Fernando Madriz Torres; Carlos Speitzer; Alejandro Speitzer	2:46
5.	"La Fogata"	Ramos	Danna Paola; Lilibeth; Luis Fernando Madriz Torres	2:00
6.	"La Marcha Del Orfanato (La Fogata)"	Vargas	Lilibeth; Kathy Castro; Greta Cervantes; María Fernanda Sasian; Jorge Trejo	3:31
7.	"El Cielo En Brazos de Papá"	Ramos; Aziz	Danna Paola	3:07
8.	"Tu Siempre Estarás"	De la Parra; Ramírez; Sieres	Luis Fernando Madriz Torres	3:16
9.	"Milagrito"	Ramos	Danna Paola	3:02
10.	"Corazón De Niña"	Ivanott; Marco Vinci	Juan Carlos Flores	3:39
11.	"Tu Nombre Está En Las Estrellas"	Ramos	Luis Fernando Madriz Torres	3:20
12.	"Chiquita Pero Picosa"	Carlos Monroy; Jaime Flores; Raúl Ornelas; Reyli Barba Arrocha	Lilibeth	3:15
13.	"¿Qué Se Sentria Tener Mamá?"	Vargas; Angeles; Aziz	Danna Paola	2:57
14.	"El Mundo Es Un Hit"	Vargas	Pedro Armendáriz Jr.	3:15
Total length:				42:33
