= 20th TVyNovelas Awards =

2002 Mexican TV awards

- Date: July 4, 2002
- Location: Mexico D.F.
- Hosted by: Raúl Velasco, Ernesto Laguardia, Luis de la Corte & Gloria Calzada

Highlights
- Most awards: El manantial (10)
- Most nominations: El manantial (14)

Television/radio coverage
- Network: Canal de las Estrellas

The 20th TVyNovelas Awards were an academy of special awards to the best soap operas and TV shows. The awards ceremony took place on July 4, 2002, in Mexico D.F. The ceremony was televised in Mexico by Canal de las Estrellas.

Raúl Velasco, Ernesto Laguardia, Luis de la Corte and Gloria Calzada hosted the show. El manantial won 10 awards, the most for the evening, including Best Telenovela. Other winners Amigas y rivales and Salomé won 2 awards and Entre el amor y el odio and Sin pecado concebido won 1 each.

== Summary of awards and nominations ==
Telenovela	Nominations	Awards
El manantial	14	10
Salomé	8	2
Entre el amor y el odio	7	1
Sin pecado concebido	6	1
Amigas y rivales	5	2
Aventuras en el tiempo	1	0
El juego de la vida	1	0

== Winners and nominees ==
=== Telenovelas ===
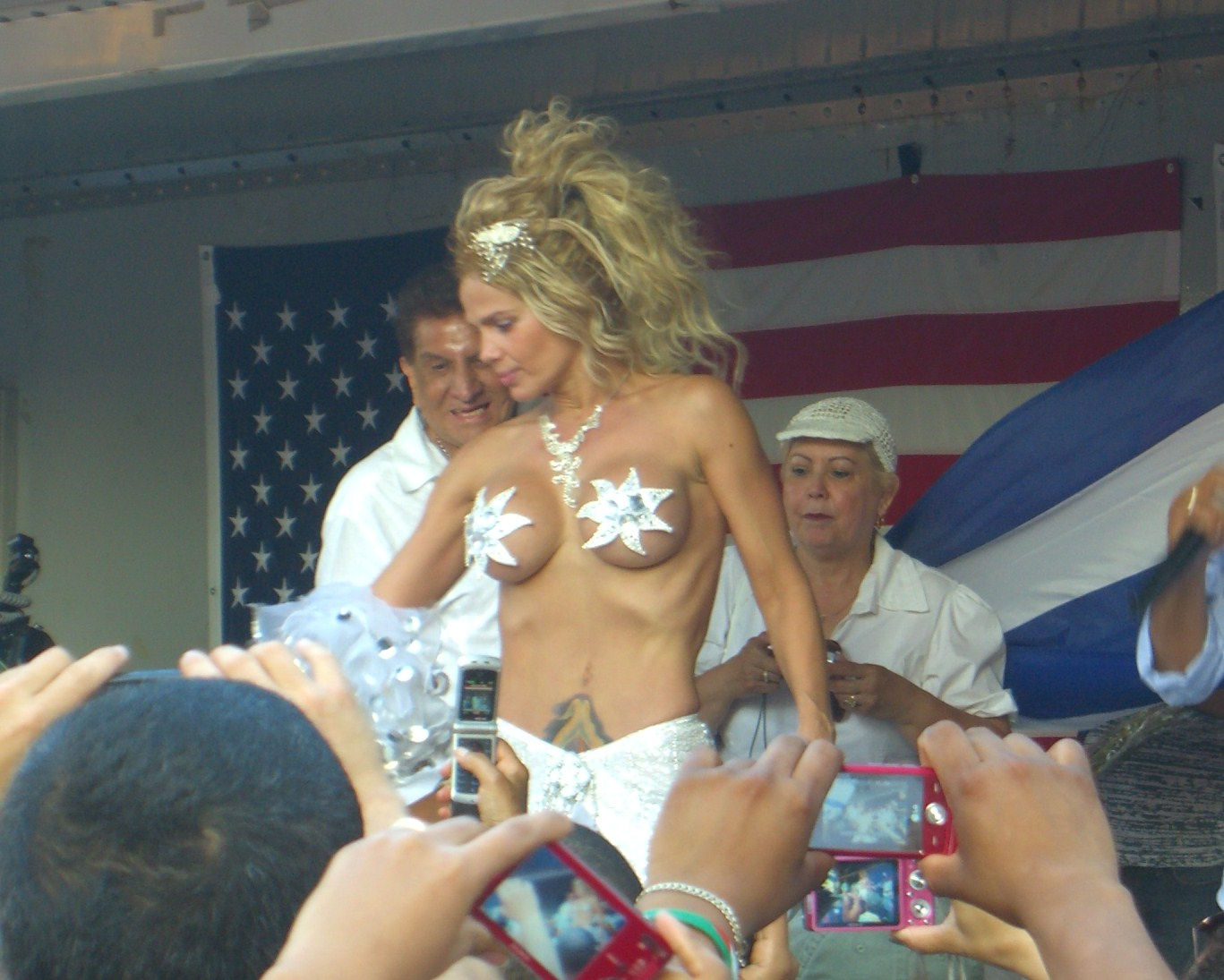
Niurka, winner for Best Supporting Actress.

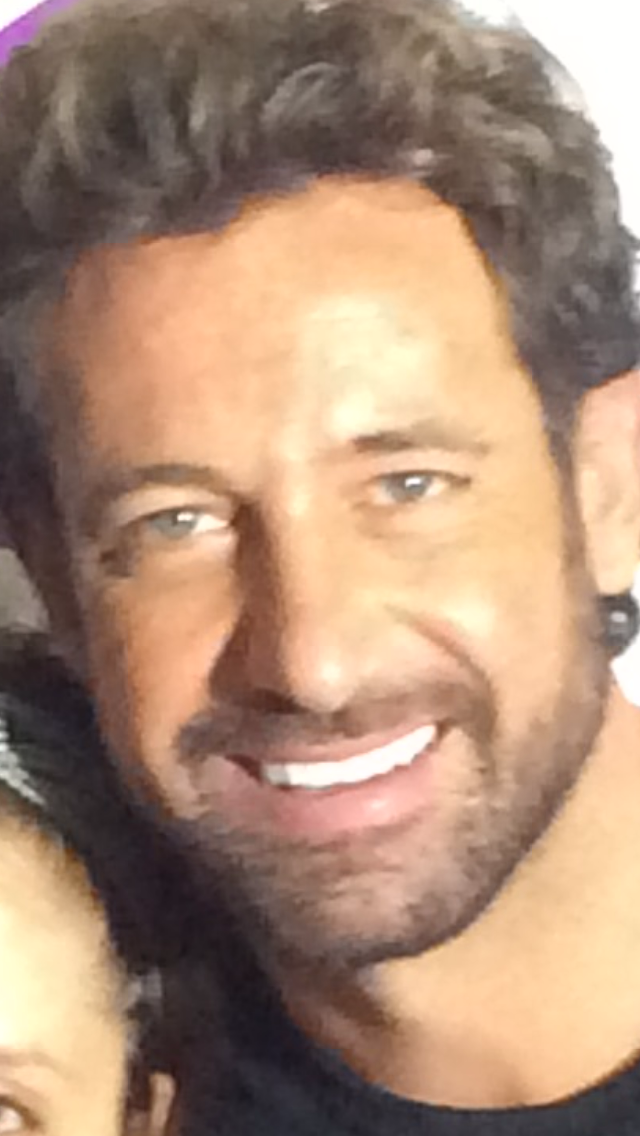
Gabriel Soto, winner for Best Male Revelation.

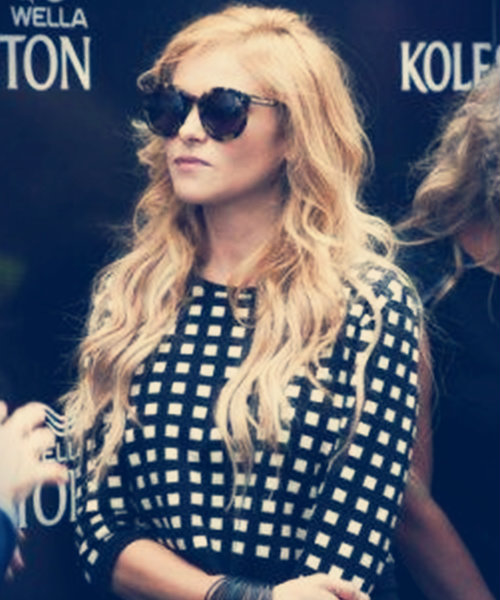
Paulina Rubio, awarded with a Special Award as Singer of the Year.

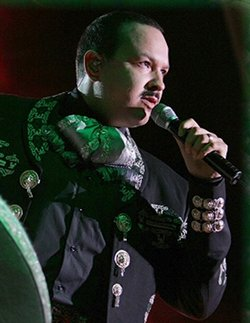
Pepe Aguilar, awarded with a Special Award as Best Ranchero Singer.

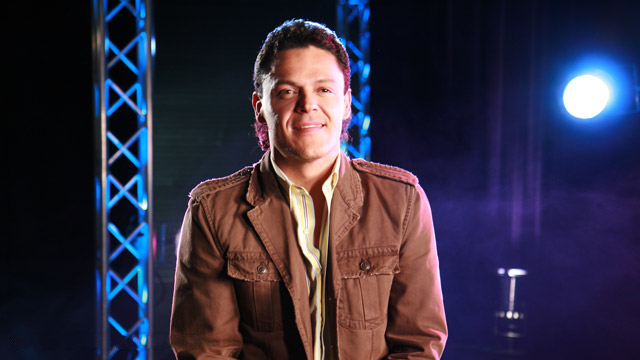
Pedro Fernández, awarded with a Special Award as Ranchero Singer with Highest International Projection.

Best Telenovela	Best Original Story or Adaptation
El manantial; Salomé; Sin pecado concebido	Cuauhtémoc Blanco, Víctor Manuel Medina and María del Carmen Peña – El manantial
Best Actress	Best Actor
Adela Noriega – El manantial; Angélica Rivera – Sin pecado concebido; Edith González – Salomé	Mauricio Islas – El manantial; César Évora – Entre el amor y el odio; Guy Ecker – Salomé
Best Antagonist Actress	Best Antagonist Actor
Itatí Cantoral – Sin pecado concebido; Joana Benedek – Amigas y rivales; Karyme Lozano – El manantial	Alejandro Tommasi – El manantial; Alberto Estrella – Entre el amor y el odio; Sergio Goyri – Sin pecado concebido
Best Leading Actress	Best Leading Actor
Daniela Romo – El manantial; Beatriz Aguirre – Sin pecado concebido; Marga López – Entre el amor y el odio	Eric del Castillo – Amigas y rivales; Joaquín Cordero – Sin pecado concebido; Manuel Ojeda – El manantial
Best Co-lead Actress	Best Co-lead Actor
Patricia Navidad – El manantial; María Sorté – Entre el amor y el odio; Patricia Reyes Spíndola – Salomé	Jorge Poza – El manantial; Aarón Hernán – Salomé; Luis Roberto Guzmán – Entre el amor y el odio
Best Supporting Actress	Best Supporting Actor
Niurka – Salomé; Carmen Salinas – Entre el amor y el odio; Sylvia Pasquel – El manantial	Rodrigo Vidal – Salomé; Rafael Inclán – Amigas y rivales; Raymundo Capetillo – El manantial
Best Female Revelation	Best Male Revelation
Susana González – Entre el amor y el odio; Angélica Vale – Amigas y rivales; Sara Maldonado – El juego de la vida	Gabriel Soto – Amigas y rivales; Christopher Uckermann – Aventuras en el tiempo; Rafael Amaya – Salomé
Best Direction
Mónica Miguel – El manantial

=== Others ===
Best Reality Show	Best Melodramatic Show
Pedro Torres – Big Brother	Silvia Pinal – Mujer, casos de la vida real
Best Comedy Actress	Best Comedy Actor
Consuelo Duval – La hora pico	Jorge Ortiz de Pinedo – Cero en conducta

=== Special awards ===
- "Silvia Derbez" Award: Olivia Bucio for El manantial
- Artistic Career: Carmen Salinas
- Career as an Animator: Don Francisco
- Career as a Comedian: Sergio Corona
- Career as a Singer: Marco Antonio Solís
- Singer of the Year: Paulina Rubio
- Best Ranchero Singer: Pepe Aguilar
- Ranchero Singer with Highest International Projection: Pedro Fernández
- Most Charismatic Host of Hoy: Alfredo Adame

== International Segment ==
The ceremony marked the 20th anniversary of the magazine's soap opera awards, hosted by Maxine Woodside. Highlights included recognizing winners in main categories, such as Best Telenovela, Best Original Story or Adaptation, Best Actress and Best Actor.

== Recognition Awards ==
As part of the commemoration of the 20th anniversary of the TVyNovelas Awards, the magazine "Recordar es vivir" selected each of the rising stars who won the award in each category per year, awarding only one from each annual ceremony. Among them are:

- Laura Flores (1983)
- Ernesto Alonso (1984)
- Victoria Ruffo (1985)
- Arturo Peniche (1986)
- Marco Antonio Muñiz (1987)
- Sebastián Ligarde (1988)
- Jacqueline Andere (1989)
- Ludwika Paleta (1990)
- Eduardo Capetillo (1991)
- Diana Bracho (1992)
- María Sorté (1993)
- Enrique Rocha (1994)
- Natalia Esperón (1995)
- Javier López "Chabelo" (1996)
- Juan Soler (1997)
- Jorge Salinas (2000)
- Helena Rojo (2001)
- Sergio Corona (2002)
