= Anabel Ferreira =

Mexican actress and comedian

Anabel Ferreira (born Anabel Ferreira Batiz; 26 September 1962, in Aguascalientes) is a Mexican actress and comedian. Ferreira has been with Televisa from 1981 until 1996 and again since 2008. In between, she spent a decade at TV Azteca. Most recently appearing on the Televisa telenovela Soy tu dueña, she is best known as the star of her own comedy/variety series, ¡Anabel! (Both programs, as with most of Ferreira's work with Televisa, have aired on Univisión & Galavisión in the United States, among other networks in other countries). Ferreira still works in Mexico but now lives in Los Angeles. She has dual citizenship with Mexico & United States.

== Early career ==
After graduating from high school in Aguascalientes, Ferreira relocated to Mexico City in 1978 so that she could take acting classes. As soon as Televisa opened its Centro de Educación Artistica in 1979, she transferred to that school, becoming one of its first graduates in 1981. That was the year she made her first television appearance on Cachun Cachun Ra Ra. Her first featured television role was on the telenovela Una limosna de amor, which also premiered in 1981. Over the next several years Ferreira would be regularly cast in several telenovelas (Cuando los hijos se van, Principessa, Senda de gloria) as well as on the comedy series Antojitos Mexicanos. She also guested on other Televisa series, including the comedy series Mis huéspedes and El hospital de la risa as well as the variety series La Carabina de Ambrosio and Siempre en domingo. Finally, in 1988 she was given the chance to star in her very own television series.

== ¡Anabel! ==
In October 1988, a week after the Seoul Olympics had ended, Televisa launched a new comedy/variety series on its Canal de las Estrellas. This comedy/variety series would rank as one of Mexico's most successful ever.

¡Anabel! was a comedy/variety series that made stars of several members of its cast, least of all Ferreira. Joining her were regulars Maria Alicia Delgado, Mario Bezares, Carlos Ignacio and, for its first few years, a young Eugenio Derbez. Ferreira invited other comedians, including Cesar Bono, Luis de Alba, Carlos Espejel, Maribel Fernández, Aida Pierce and Juan Verduzco, among others, as guest stars. She even invited singers, including Pepe Aguilar, Pedro Fernández, Maribel Guardia, Alejandra Guzmán, Lucero, Timbiriche and Gloria Trevi, among others, to perform on her show.

The show consisted of comedy sketches and musical numbers. Some of these musical numbers were performed by the cast, while others were by the musical guests (who would be phased out by the mid-1990s.) Among the most notable sketches on the program were El y Ella and Coralia y Yadhira. Coralia Davalillo (Ferreira) was a teenaged girl who lived with her mother, Yadhira (Delgado). One of the Coralia y Yadhira sketches featured one of the most famous musical numbers in Anabel's long run, that being Coralia's performance, at a talent competition, of "La Licuadora."

Ferreira's contract with Televisa would not be renewed in 1996, resulting in Anabel's cancellation after eight years on the air.

== The TV Azteca years (1997–2007) ==
In 1997, Ferreira was cast by TV Azteca to host a variety show titled, Buenos Noches con Anabel. However, after a few weeks, the series was cancelled, and as a result Ferreira spent the next decade making guest appearances on other TV Azteca programs. Unable to get another series on the network, Ferreira decided to leave TV Azteca in 2007 and prepared for her return to Televisa. Near the end of her time at TV Azteca, she was profiled in the 2007 book, Televisa Presenta, which coincided with Televisa's golden anniversary as a network.

== Returning to Televisa (2008–present) ==
Ferreira rejoined Televisa in 2008 and has since been a guest on many recent programs, including Hoy, Muevete and Desmadruga2. She was a guest co-host of one episode of the latter program not soon after she returned to the network. In 2009 while still under Televisa contract, Ferreira relocated to her current home in Los Angeles; she and Guardia are among the few Televisa contract players to reside in the United States while still working in Mexico full-time. Soy tu Dueña premiered in 2010 and marked her first regular television series role in 13 years and her first for Televisa since 1996. Ferreira's castmates on this series include Lucero and Silvia Pinal.

For her work in television Ferreira has been inducted into the Paseo de las Luminarias in Mexico City.
