= TVyNovelas Award for Best Supporting Actor =

Mexican television award

- Awarded for: Best performance by an actor in a supporting role
- First award: 1993; Fernando Ciangherotti & Raúl Padilla "Chóforo"; María Mercedes
- Currently held by: 2018; Sergio Mur; Papá a toda madre

== Winners and nominees ==
=== 1990s ===
Winner	Nominated
11th TVyNovelas Awards
Fernando Ciangherotti and Raúl Padilla "Chóforo" for María Mercedes	Roberto Antúnez for Triángulo
~~1994~~
13th TVyNovelas Awards
Pedro Weber "Chatanuga" for Agujetas de color de rosa	Alejandro Tommasi for Imperio de cristal; Alfonso Iturralde for Marimar
14th TVyNovelas Awards
Otto Sirgo for Lazos de amor	Miguel Pizarro for La Dueña; Rafael Rojas for Si Dios me quita la vida
15th TVyNovelas Awards
Leonardo Daniel for Cañaveral de pasiones	Juan Peláez for La antorcha encendida; Odiseo Bichir for La sombra del otro
16th TVyNovelas Awards
Alejandro Ruiz for Esmeralda	Juan Manuel Bernal for Te sigo amando; Juan Pablo Gamboa for Esmeralda
17th TVyNovelas Awards
César Évora for El Privilegio de Amar	Héctor Bonilla for Señora; Marcelo Buquet for La usurpadora

=== 2000s ===
Winner	Nominated
18th TVyNovelas Awards
César Évora for Laberintos de pasión	Héctor Bonilla for La vida en el espejo; Manuel Saval for Rosalinda
19th TVyNovelas Awards
Pablo Montero for Abrázame muy fuerte	Fabián Robles for Primer amor, a mil por hora; Manuel Ojeda for El precio de tu amor
20th TVyNovelas Awards
Rodrigo Vidal for Salomé	Juan Peláez for Sin pecado concebido; Raymundo Capetillo for El Manantial
21st TVyNovelas Awards
Rafael Inclán for Clase 406	Gabriel Soto for Las vías del amor; Sergio Corona for De pocas, pocas pulgas
22nd TVyNovelas Awards
Ernesto Laguardia for Amor Real	Alexis Ayala for Amarte es mi Pecado; Arath de la Torre for Alegrijes y Rebujos
23rd TVyNovelas Awards
Eric del Castillo for Apuesta por un amor	Carlos Bracho for Mujer de madera; Roberto Vander for Rubí
24th TVyNovelas Awards
Ernesto Laguardia for Alborada	César Évora for La esposa virgen; Rafael Inclán for Rebelde; René Casados for La Madrastra
25th TVyNovelas Awards
José José for La fea más bella	Agustín Arana for La fea más bella; Francisco Rubio for Las dos caras de Ana; José Luis Reséndez for Heridas de amor; Sergio Mayer for La fea más bella
~~2008 and 2009~~

=== 2010s ===
Winner	Nominated
~~2010 to 2012~~
31st TVyNovelas Awards
Flavio Medina for Amor bravío	Eric del Castillo for Abismo de pasión; Pablo Valentín for Por ella soy Eva
32nd TVyNovelas Awards
Manuel "Flaco" Ibáñez for La mujer del Vendaval	José Carlos Ruiz for Corazón indomable; Juan Carlos Barreto for Mentir para vivir
33rd TVyNovelas Awards
Osvaldo Benavides for Lo que la vida me robó	Fabián Robles for La malquerida; Juan Carlos Colombo for Yo no creo en los hombres; Salvador Sánchez for Quiero amarte
34th TVyNovelas Awards
Pierre Angelo for La vecina	Manuel Landeta for Amor de barrio; Ricardo Fastlicht for Antes muerta que Lichita; Alejandro Tommasi for Hasta el fin del mundo; Manuel "Flaco" Ibáñez for La sombra del pasado
35th TVyNovelas Awards
Juan Vidal for Vino el amor	Eduardo España for El hotel de los secretos; Ari Telch for La candidata; Pablo Perroni for Sin rastro de ti; Otto Sirgo for Tres veces Ana
36th TVyNovelas Awards
Sergio Mur for Papá a toda madre	Carlos Valencia for Caer en tentación; Fabián Robles for En tierras salvajes; Marco Méndez for La doble vida de Estela Carrillo; Sergio Reynoso for Sin tu mirada

== Records ==
- Most awarded actor: César Évora and Ernesto Laguardia, 2 times.
- Most nominated actor: César Évora with 3 nominations.
- Most nominated actor without a win: Alejandro Tommasi, Héctor Bonilla and Fabián Robles with 2 nominations.
- Actor winning all nominations: Ernesto Laguardia, 2 times.
- Youngest winner: Pablo Montero, 27 years old.
- Youngest nominee: Fabián Robles, 27 years old.
- Oldest winner: Eric del Castillo, 71 years old.
- Oldest nominee: Eric del Castillo, 80 years old.
- Actor winning after short time: César Évora by (El Privilegio de Amar, 1999) and (Laberintos de pasión, 2000), 2 consecutive years.
- Actor winning after long time: Ernesto Laguardia by (Amor Real, 2004) and (Alborada, 2006), 2 years difference.
- Actor that winning the award for the same role: Ernesto Laguardia (Amor Real, 2004) and Osvaldo Benavides (Lo que la vida me robó, 2015)
- Actor winning this category, despite having been as a main villain:
  - Ernesto Laguardia (Amor Real, 2004)
  - Flavio Medina (Amor bravío, 2013)
  - Manuel "Flaco" Ibáñez (La mujer del Vendaval, 2014)
- Foreign winning actor:
  - César Évora from Cuba
  - Juan Vidal from Dominican Republic
  - Sergio Mur from Spain
