= 25th TVyNovelas Awards =

2007 Mexican TV awards

- Date: May 12, 2007
- Location: Mundo Imperial Forum, Acapulco, Guerrero
- Hosted by: Lucero

Highlights
- Most awards: La fea más bella (7)
- Most nominations: La fea más bella (16)

Television/radio coverage
- Network: Canal de las Estrellas

The 25th TVyNovelas Awards were an academy of special awards to the best soap operas and TV shows. The awards ceremony took place on May 12, 2007 in the Mundo Imperial Forum, Acapulco, Guerrero. The ceremony was televised in Mexico by Canal de las Estrellas.

Lucero hosted the show. La fea más bella won 7 awards, the most for the evening, including Best Telenovela. Other winners Mundo de fieras won 4 awards, La verdad oculta won 3 awards and Código postal won 1 award.

== Summary of awards and nominations ==
| Telenovela | Nominations | Awards |
|---|---|---|
| La fea más bella | 16 | 7 |
| Heridas de amor | 11 | 0 |
| Mundo de fieras | 8 | 4 |
| La verdad oculta | 8 | 3 |
| Las dos caras de Ana | 8 | 0 |
| Amar sin límites | 7 | 0 |
| Código postal | 2 | 1 |
| Duelo de pasiones | 1 | 0 |

== Winners and nominees ==
=== Telenovelas ===
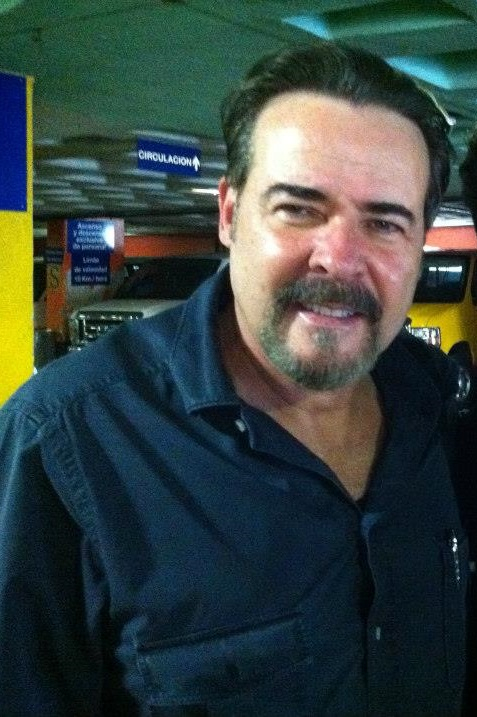
César Évora, winner for Best Antagonist Actor.

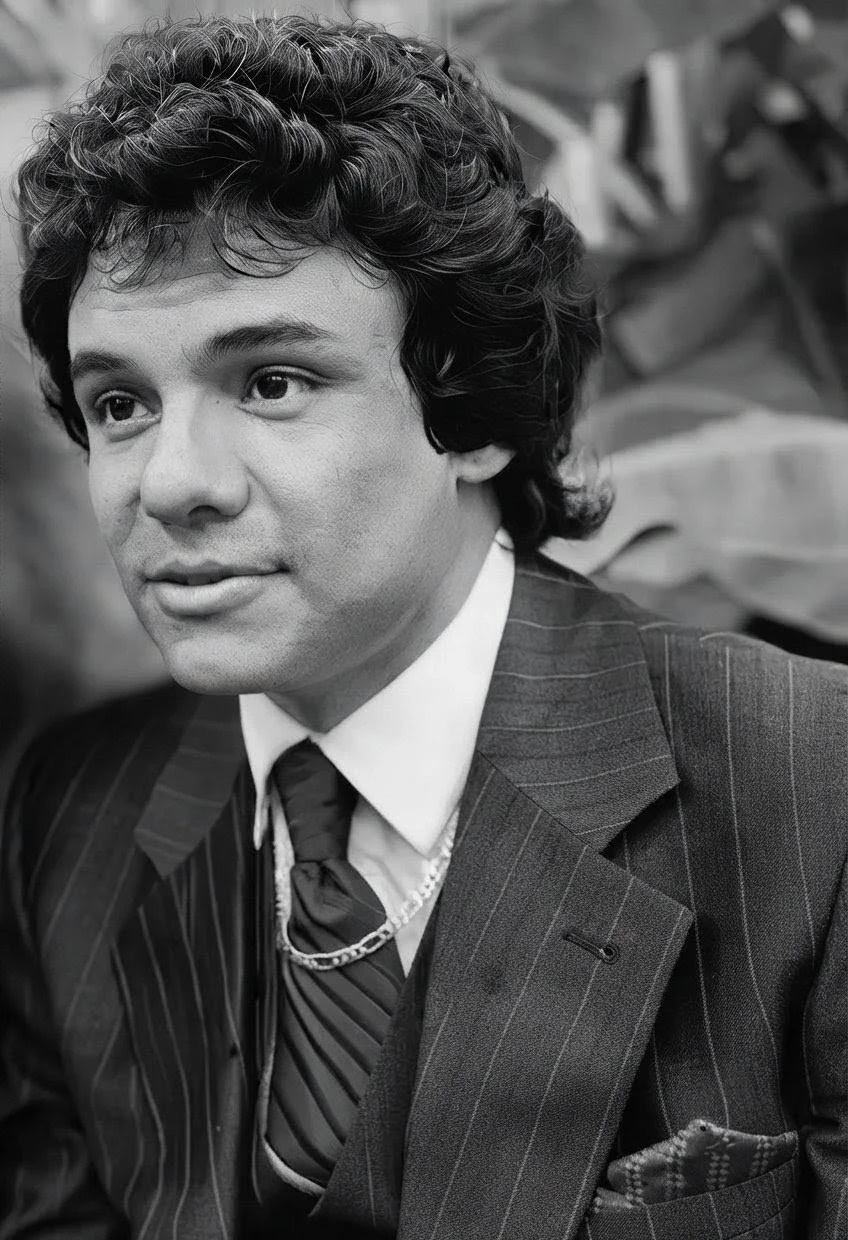
José José, winner for Best Supporting Actor.

| Best Telenovela | Best Musical Theme |
|---|---|
| La fea más bella; Heridas de amor; Las dos caras de Ana; La verdad oculta; Mundo de fieras | "El club de las feas" — Banda El Recodo – La fea más bella; "Antes de que te vayas" — Marco Antonio Solís – Mundo de fieras; "Coleccionista de canciones" — Camila – Las dos caras de Ana; "Dispárame, dispara" — Laura Pausini – Amar sin limites; "Heridas de amor" — Ricardo Montaner – Heridas de amor |
| Best Actress | Best Actor |
| Angélica Vale – La fea más bella; Alejandra Barros – La verdad oculta; Ana Layevska – Las dos caras de Ana; Jacqueline Bracamontes – Heridas de amor; Karyme Lozano – Amar sin limites | Eduardo Yáñez – La verdad oculta; Guy Ecker – Heridas de amor; Jaime Camil – La fea más bella; Rafael Amaya – Las dos caras de Ana; Valentino Lanús – Amar sin limites |
| Best Antagonist Actress | Best Antagonist Actor |
| Edith González – Mundo de fieras; Fabiola Campomanes – Duelo de pasiones; Margarita Magaña – La verdad oculta; Patricia Navidad – La fea más bella; Sabine Moussier – Amar sin limites | César Évora – Mundo de fieras; Mauricio Aspe – Las dos caras de Ana; Raúl Magaña – La fea más bella; René Strickler – Amar sin limites; Sergio Sendel – Heridas de amor |
| Best Leading Actress | Best Leading Actor |
| Helena Rojo – Mundo de fieras; Angélica María – La fea más bella; Diana Bracho – Heridas de amor; María Rubio – Las dos caras de Ana; María Sorté – Amar sin limites | Eric del Castillo – La verdad oculta; Julio Alemán – La verdad oculta; Carlos Bracho – La fea más bella; Enrique Lizalde – Heridas de amor; José Carlos Ruiz – Amar sin limites |
| Best Supporting Actress | Best Supporting Actor |
| Elizabeth Álvarez – La fea más bella; Íngrid Martz – Heridas de amor; Karla Álvarez – Heridas de amor; Laura Flores – Mundo de fieras; Nora Salinas – La fea más bella | José José – La fea más bella; Agustín Arana – La fea más bella; Francisco Rubio – Las dos caras de Ana; José Luis Reséndez – Heridas de amor; Sergio Mayer – La fea más bella |
| Best Young Lead Actress or Actor | Best Direction |
| Imanol – Código postal; Claudia Troyo – La verdad oculta; Erick Guecha – La fea más bella; Jacqueline García – Código postal; Silvia Ramírez – La verdad oculta | Salvador Garcini and Rodrigo Zaunbos – La fea más bella; Claudia Elisa Aguilar and Gastón Tuset – Las dos caras de Ana; Claudio Reyes Rubio and José Ángel García – La verdad oculta; Jorge Édgar Ramírez and Alberto Díaz – Mundo de fieras; Sergio Cataño – Heridas de amor |

=== Others ===
| Best Comedy Program or Series | Best Variety Program or Musical |
|---|---|
| Amor mío; El privilegio de mandar; La hora pico; Qué madre tan padre; Vecinos | La parodia; Hoy; Muévete; Nuestra casa; Otro rollo |
| Best Competitions or Reality Program | Best Restricted TV Program |
| Cantando por un sueño; Bailando por la boda de mis sueños; En familia con Chabelo; Los reyes de la canción; Vas o no vas | Derecho de admisión; Es de noche... ¡Y ya llegué!; Furia musical; Las hijas; Netas divinas |
| Best Special Program | Best Host or Hostess |
| Teletón México; Aún hay más: Homenaje a Raúl Velasco; Guerrero brilla; Mañanitas a la Virgen; Voces con causa | Andrea Legarreta – Hoy; Adal Ramones – Otro rollo; Facundo – Incógnito; Jorge Poza – Hoy; Leticia Calderón – Hoy |
| Best Comedic Actress | Best Comedic Actor |
| Consuelo Duval – La hora pico; Ana Bertha Espín – Vecinos; Mayrín Villanueva – Vecinos; Roxana Castellanos – La parodia; Vanessa Guzmán – Amor mío | Arath de la Torre – La parodia; Adrián Uribe – La hora pico; Freddy Ortega and Germán Ortega – La parodia; Raúl Araiza – Amor mío; Yordi Rosado – Otro rollo |

=== Special awards ===
- Audience's Favorite Show: La fea más bella
- Audience's Favorite Star: Edith González for Mundo de fieras
- Best Entertainment Program: Otro rollo
- Special Award for Mujer, casos de la vida real by Silvia Pinal
- Artistic Career: Veronica Castro

=== Absent ===
People who did not attend the ceremony and were nominated in the shortlist in each category:

- Ana Layevska
- Emilio Larrosa
- Jacqueline Bracamontes
- Karyme Lozano
- Laura Flores
- María Rubio
- María Sorté
- Rafael Amaya
- René Strickler
- Salvador Mejía Alejandre
- Sergio Sendel
- Valentino Lanús
- Vanessa Guzmán
