= Juan Verduzco =

Mexican actor (1946–2024)

Juan Verduczo
- Born: 28 January 1946; Mexico City, Mexico
- Died: 4 March 2024 (aged 78); Mexico City, Mexico
- Occupation: Actor

Juan Verduzco (28 January 1946 – 4 March 2024) was a Mexican actor. He was best known for his appearance as Don Camerino in La familia P. Luche. Verduzco died on 4 March 2024, at the age of 78.

== Filmography ==
=== Telenovelas ===
- Mundo de juguete (1974)
- Gotita de gente (1978–1979)
- Los ricos también lloran (1979–1980)
- Sandra y Paulina (1980)
- Caminemos (1980)
- Déjame vivir (1982)
- La Fiera (1983)
- Rosa salvaje (1987)
- Mi segunda madre (1989)
- Agujetas de color de rosa (1994)
- María José (1995)
- Pobre niña rica (1995)
- La culpa (1996)
- ¡Vivan los niños! (2002)
- Velo de novia (2003)
- Bajo la misma piel (2003)
- Amy, la niña de la mochila azul (2004)
- La fea más bella (2004)
- Duelo de Pasiones (2006)
- Destilando Amor (2007)
- Amor sin maquillaje (2007)
- Alma de hierro (2008)
- Atrévete a soñar (2009)
- Para volver a amar (2010)
- Una familia con suerte (2011)
- Cachito de cielo (2012)
- Amores verdaderos (2012)
- Wild at Heart (2013)
- Por siempre mi amor (2013)
- The Stray Cat (2014)
- Hasta el fin del mundo (2014)
- El hotel de los secretos (2016)
- Un camino hacia el destino (2016)
- Mi adorable maldición (2017)
- La doble vida de Estela Carrillo (2017)
- Tenías que ser tú (2018)
- Tomorrow is a New Day (2018)
- Ringo (2019)
- Te doy la vida (2020)

=== Other series ===
- Dr. Cándido Pérez (1987–1993)
- Humor es... Los Comediantes (2000–2001)
- Hospital El paisa (2004)
- Vecinos (2005–2007)
- La familia P. Luche (2002–2004/2007/2012)
- Como dice el dicho (2013)
- Una familia de diez (2020)
- Esta historia me suena (2022)
