= Roxana Castellanos =

Mexican actress and television host

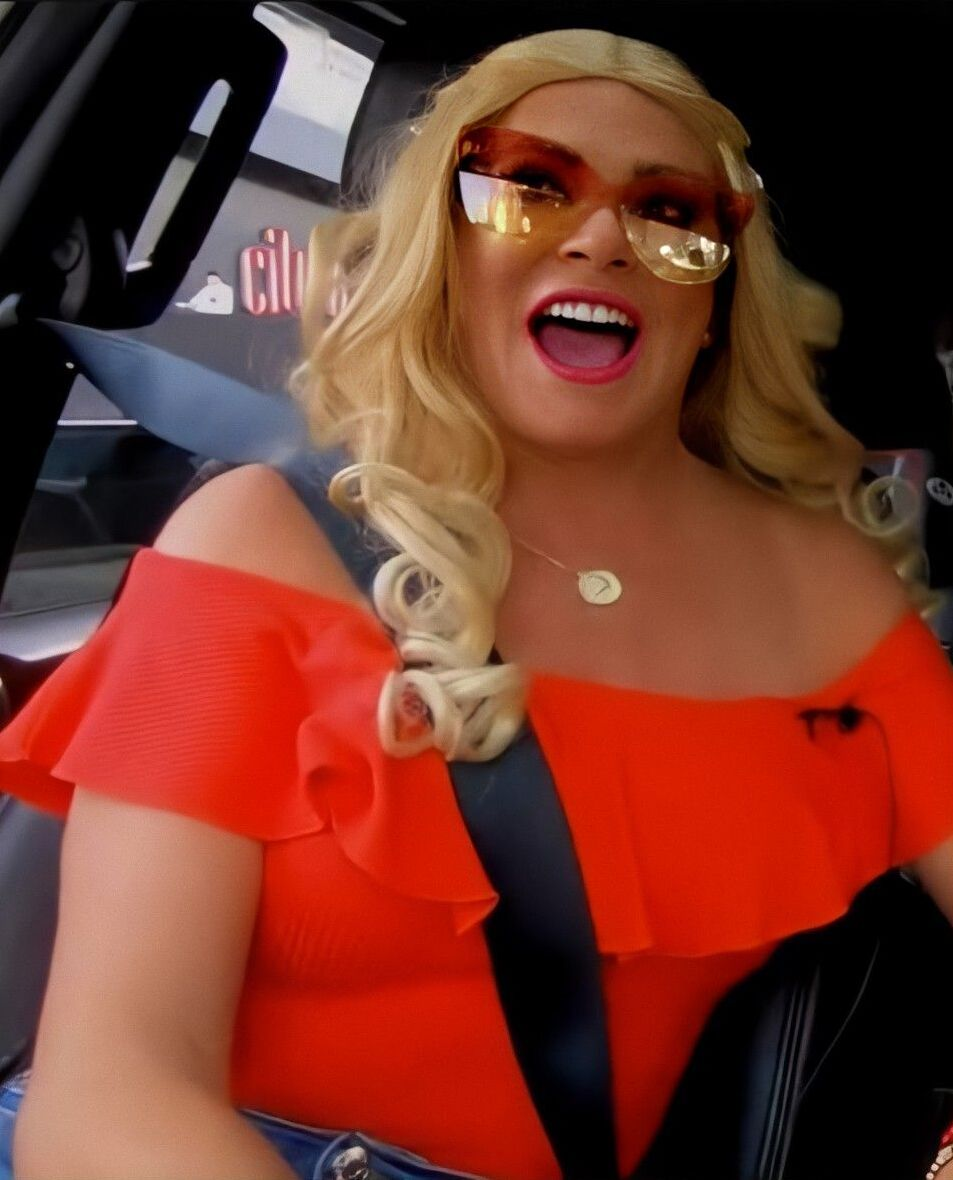
- Castellanos dressed as her character Deyanira Rubí from Otro Rollo
- Born: Roxana Castellanos Gómez; 12 February 1973 (age 53); Distrito Federal, Mexico
- Other names: Roxanna Castella, Rox, Deyanira Rubi
- Occupations: Actress, singer, tv hostess
- Years active: 1994–present
- Relatives: Kelchie Arizmendi (cousin)

Roxana Castellanos Gómez (born 12 February 1973) is a Mexican actress and television host.

== Biography ==
Castellanos was born on 12 February 1973 in Distrito Federal, Mexico. She is the daughter of Lorenzo Castellanos and Carmina Gómez. After completing her high school studies, she entered the CEA of Televisa. Her first job as an actress was in the series Papá soltero and in the telenovelas Volver a Empezar and Tú y yo. In 1998 she starred as Yadhira in La Mentira. She later appeared in the telenovelas Primer amor, a mil por hora, Alegrijes y rebujos and Amarte es mi pecado.

In 2004 she participated as a contestant in the reality show Big Brother VIP 3 (Part 2), which she won.

== Filmography ==
=== Television ===
Year	Title	Role	Notes
1994	Papá soltero		
1994	Volver a Empezar		
1996-1997	Tú y yo	Elizabeth	Recurring role
1996-2006	Otro Rollo	Herself	Cast member
1998	La Mentira	Yadhira Balanzario	Recurring role
1999	Infierno en el paraíso	Janet	Recurring role
2000	Primer amor, a mil por hora	Ana Lozano	Recurring role
2001	Gilberto Gless: El mejor imitador del mundo	Herself	Television film
2001	Diseñador ambos sexos	Carla	
2002	Gran Carnal: Los fenómenos	Deyanira Rubí	
2002	El gran carnal 2	Paulina Prieto	
2003-2004	Alegrijes y rebujos	Elvira Gómez de Sánchez	Supporting role
2004	Amarte es mi pecado		Special appearance
2004	Hospital el paisa	Deyanira Rubí	
2004	Big Brother VIP 3 (Part 2)	Herself	Contestant, season winner
2004	La oreja	Herself	Host
2004	Con todo	Herself	Host
2004	No manches	Herself	Host
2004	100 mexicanos dijeron	Herself	Contestant
2004-2005	VidaTv	Herself	Host
2004-2006	Rebelde	Jaqueline	Special appearance
2005-2007	Vecinos	Vanessa Balboa	
2006	Wax, TV ácida	Herself	Host
2007	La parodia	Various characters	
2007	Objetos perdidos	Various characters	
2009-2012	Hoy	Herself	Host
2012	Estrella2	Various characters	
2013	On the Rox	Herself	Host
2013	Como dice el dicho	Alondra	Episode: "Más pronto cae un hablador"
2015	Roxana	Herself	Host
2016	Adal el show	Various characters	
2016–present	Cuéntamelo ya!	Herself	Host
2019-2021	Mi querida herencia	Deyanira Rubí	
2024	Las hijas de la señora García	Susana Guzmán	Main cast

== Awards and nominations ==
Year	Award	Category	Nominee	Result
2007	25th TVyNovelas Awards	Best Female Comedy Star	La Parodia	Nominated
