= Aida Pierce =

Mexican actress and comedian (born 1956)

Aida María Pierce
- Born: Aida María Zerecero Pierce; August 15, 1956 (age 70); Acapulco, Guerrero, Mexico
- Occupations: Actress, comedian
- Years active: 1981 – present

Aida María Zerecero Pierce (born August 15, 1956, in Acapulco, Guerrero) is a Mexican actress and comedian, best known internationally for her work on various telenovelas and comedy series aired by Televisa over the years. Many of her television series have also been broadcast in other countries, most notably by Univision in the United States.

== Biography ==
At 17, Pierce, whose parents were Jose Luis Zerecero and Aida Pierce, left Acapulco for Mexico City, and attended El Instituto Andrés Soler, where she studied acting and to become a secretary. She also attended la Academia de Emma Pulido, where she studied jazz, English, and French. She began her career on stage, appearing in the Mexican productions of Godspell, Peter Pan, Jesus Christ Superstar, and Mame, among other plays. Her experience on stage led to a contract with Televisa. She was first cast as Doña Tecla on Alegrías de Mediodía in 1981. Later that year she joined the cast of La matraca, which lasted one year, and as a recurring cast member of La Carabina de Ambrosio, where she remained until 1984. Her next television series was Salón de belleza, which premiered in 1985, the same year she made her film debut in Los rockeros del barrio.

In 1986, she joined the cast of Cosas de casados. That same year, while videotaping that series at Televisa's Chapultepec studios, she was taping El hospital de la risa, which premiered that same year, at Televisa San Angel. On the former series, she portrayed a newlywed wife, and on the latter she portrayed "Remedios". Her next series, Y sin embargo...se mueve, did not premiere until 1994. She made four additional movies. During the filming of one, El Rey de los Taxistas (1989) with Luis de Alba and Maribel Guardia,

== Family ==
Pierce's son is actor/international video game champion Rubén Morales Zerecero (born 26 May 1989).

== Recent years ==
Her last two films to date were released in 1993. In Se equivoco la ciguena, she played the same nurse character she had portrayed in El hospital de la risa. The other, Dos fantasmas sinverguenzas, was essentially a showcase for her comic talents. In 1996, she became the first comedian to pose nude in the Mexican edition of Playboy. In Serafin, which premiered in Mexico in 1999 and in the United States in 2000, Pierce made her dramatic television debut as "Barbara". She wasn't the only actress in the series with connections to her hometown. By the time Serafin ended Pierce had begun making appearances on Humor es...los comediantes, officially joining the cast in 2000. She was still a regular on the series when it ended in 2001 as both co-host and performer.

During the late 1990s and early 2000s (decade), she was a regular on two television series: Humor es ... los comediantes and Carita de angel. In recent years, much of Pierce's television work has been in telenovelas, such as Complices al rescate and, most recently, Duelo de pasiones. Pierce continues to perform her comedy routines live on stage throughout Mexico, usually writing her own stage material. She has also sung in many of her stage appearances. She has appeared as a radio personality. She continues to make guest appearances on other Televisa series, including Mujer...casos de la vida real, Muevete (reuniting her with Guardia), Fabrica de risas (reuniting her with Jorge Ortiz de Pinedo), Al sabor del chef, and Desmadruga2, among other series. She recorded several songs, including her 1983 hit, "Sonríe, sintonízate con mi alegría", which she first performed at the 12th Mexican national selection for the OTI Festival; "Nos vamos a pertenece", which is one of two songs posted on her website; and "Príncipe", which she performs at the end of most of her personal appearances and has become her signature song.

She was included in the 2007 book Televisa Presenta, which was published on the occasion of the network's 50th anniversary. She most recently wrote a comedy play, Sexshop.

As with most aging actresses under Televisa contract over the years (Susana Dosamantes and Angelica Maria are among recent examples), Pierce came to the decision to end her 31-year relationship with the network in 2012, allowing her to finish her television career on rival television networks in Mexico or in the United States. In April 2012, she signed to be a regular on TV Azteca's Buenos Noches America program, and there is a possibility that she may appear on any Spanish-language TV network, including Estrella TV, Telemundo and Univision, in the U.S. She will be returning to movie theaters throughout Latin America for the first time in 20 years when Justicia a la Mexicana, co-starring de Alba, Guardia and Lorena Herrera, arrives in theaters in late 2013.

For her work in television, Pierce was inducted into the Paseo de las Luminarias (Mexico's equivalent of the Hollywood Walk of Fame) at Mexico City's Plaza de las Estrellas in 2007.
