= Mita y mita =

- Genre: Sitcom
- Based on: Easy Money by Shmulik Levy
- Written by: Luis Eduardo Reyes
- Directed by: Luis Eduardo Reyes
- Starring: Martín Altomaro; Magali Boysselle; Damayanti Quintanar; Dino García
- Theme music composer: Aleks Syntek
- Opening theme: "Mita y Mita" by Aleks Syntek
- Country of origin: Mexico
- Original language: Spanish
- No. of seasons: 1
- No. of episodes: 13

Production
- Executive producer: Pitipol Ibarra
- Producer: Marcela Ibarra
- Running time: 21–24 minutes
- Production company: Televisa

Original release
- Network: Las Estrellas
- Release: August 30 – November 29, 2017

Mita y mita is a Mexican sitcom that premiered on Las Estrellas on August 30, 2017 and ended on November 29, 2017. The series is produced by Pitipol Ibarra for Televisa, based on the series Easy Money written by Shmulik Levy. It stars Martín Altomaro, Magali Boysselle, Damayanti Quintanar, and Dino García.

The series's name is a common shortening of "mitad y mitad", literally meaning half and half.

The series revolves around Néstor, a disobliged fifty year old, who wins the lottery and must share his prize with his wife, Olivia.

== Plot ==
Néstor is maintained by his wife Olivia, she is fed up with the situation and asks for a divorce, but just when he is about to stay on the street, he receives a stroke of luck that changes his destiny. Néstor wins the lottery, 200 million pesos, which by law he will have to share with his wife Olivia, but he will not be willing to share his money with the woman he loathes with all his soul. For Néstor, the solution will be to reconquer his wife and thus avoid the divorce that will force him to share his fortune. To achieve that goal, he'll need the help of his close friends Silvio and Mariana.

When Olivia discloses to her father her wishes to divorce Néstor, he informs her that the papers she recently signed gave her ownership of his valuable law firm and divorcing Néstor would mean giving Néstor half of this fortune. Reluctantly, Olivia will have to reconquer her husband and avoid divorcing in order to keep from sharing her new found wealth.

== Cast ==
=== Main ===
- Martín Altomaro as Néstor, when he wins the lottery, he is disappointed to know that he could lose half if he divorces his wife.
- Magali Boysselle as Olivia, she goes into crisis easily if things do not go as she wants and what she wants is a divorce.
- Damayanti Quintanar as Mariana, she is the sensitive, loving and tender best friend of Nestor, who is in love with him.
- Dino García as Silvio, he is Néstor's best friend who accompanies him in all his adventures.

== Episodes ==
No.	Title	Original release date
1	"Lotería"	August 30, 2017
From Mariana's stationery comes the winning lottery ticket and it is Néstor who buys it. This is the story of the frenzied pursuit of the $200 million jackpot. Finding it, Nestor thinks that, as his marriage is, he'd be dead first before giving his wife mita and mita.
2	"La reconciliación"	September 6, 2017
Néstor runs to tell his friends that Olivia his almost ex-wife ran him from his house. She does the same revealing to her father that she is going to divorce and that she has a lover, but both are forced to pretend a reconciliation to gain time.
3	"El cobro"	September 13, 2017
Néstor has not been able to collect the money, not knowing what to do with it. Silvio, his friend from the laundries, convinces him to ask Mariana a favor: she will collect the prize and will gradually give him the money.
4	"Otro Lord más, sin querer queriendo"	September 27, 2017
Néstor wants to have dinner at a very elegant place for Mariana. He goes to her house and makes a stick; the restaurant does not let them enter. In the end, they have a great time together. He does a surprise shopping and ends up engraving like a lord more.
5	"No me corres, yo me voy"	October 4, 2017
Néstor relaxed, Silvio with scolding, so Don Pedro presses until reaching an arrangement. Olivia and Néstor fight again, he leaves his house, and resorts to Vicente to recommend a hotel; he takes them and installs them.
6	"Terapia 1 Pareja 0"	October 11, 2017
Néstor and Olivia have dinner with their friends, she recommends couple therapy. Mariana tells Néstor that Silvio has problems. Everyone thinks he got the prize, for everything in the laundry. Mariana and Nestor go to their first therapy session.
7	"La subasta"	October 18, 2017
At last Mariana and Néstor go to dinner. They meet Vicente and Silvio at an event where Arturo works as a waiter.
8	"La transa"	October 25, 2017
When Néstor tries to recover his routine, he goes to the workshop of Poncho, where a client makes an unseemly proposal, and this puts them in a problem.
9	"La sorpresa"	November 1, 2017
Olivia dawns happy, goes from one surprise to another. Meanwhile, a wonderful day awaits Néstor and Mariana, who leave SPA to prepare a night ... that none imagined.
10	"La fiesta"	November 8, 2017
Nestor is determined to make Olivia sick, and listens to a council that has her on the verge of a nervous breakdown. She organizes a reunion of excompañeras and he, a play.
11	"il Néstore"	November 15, 2017
Vicente invites Néstor to a rally. A guest cancels, and a new guest arrives last minute to who Néstor less expected and would like to see. This assistant makes him spend one of the most difficult days of his life, but he will pay for it.
12	"La venganza"	November 22, 2017
The term is over. Someone from the past returns to Mariana. The money is in danger, the solution: Gabriela. Olivia receives a stroke of luck and acts to achieve her dream. Néstor discovers it and wins it; Now she does not care, she wants a divorce.
13	"La revelación"	November 29, 2017
Néstor faces one more threat, and is about to take a desperate step along with Silvio and Vicente. Gabriela falls into a coma. Olivia with everyone in the hospital finds out about the money from Anita.

== Awards and nominations ==
Year	Award	Category	Nominated	Result
2018	TVyNovelas Awards	Best Comedy Program	Pitipol Ibarra	Nominated
