= Apuesta por un amor =

Mexican telenovela

- Created by: Bernardo Romero Pereiro
- Written by: Gabriela Ortigoza; Juan Carlos Alcalá
- Directed by: Alfredo Gurrola
- Starring: Patricia Manterola; Juan Soler; Eric del Castillo; Roberto Palazuelos; Mónika Sánchez; Jorge Vargas; Dacia González; Roberto Ballesteros
- Theme music composer: Consuelo Velázquez
- Opening theme: "Que seas felíz" by Luis Miguel
- Ending theme: "Que seas felíz" by Luis Miguel
- Country of origin: Mexico
- Original language: Spanish
- No. of episodes: 130

Production
- Executive producer: Angelli Nesma Medina
- Producer: Ignacio Alarcón
- Cinematography: Ernesto Arreola; Héctor Márquez
- Editors: Octavio López; Alfredo Juárez; Daniel Rentería
- Running time: 41-44 minutes
- Production company: Televisa

Original release
- Network: Canal de las Estrellas
- Release: October 25, 2004 – April 22, 2005

Apuesta por un Amor (English: Gambling on Love) is a Mexican telenovela produced by Angelli Nesma Medina for Televisa in 2004.

The telenovela stars Patricia Manterola, Juan Soler, Eric del Castillo, Roberto Palazuelos, Mónika Sánchez, Jorge Vargas, Dacia González and Roberto Ballesteros.

Univision tlnovelas started broadcasting Apuesta por un amor on March 31, 2014.

== Plot ==
Julia Montaño (Patricia Manterola) is the daughter of Don Julio Montaño (Jorge Vargas), a wealthy landowner in the Yucatán Peninsula. She is a beautiful, strong-willed and sometimes arrogant woman, who flouts her father's will and the customs of their small town by spending her days herding cattle and overseeing the management of her father's ranch. She has two siblings - Álvaro (Fabián Robles), a dissipated young man who spends the majority of his time chasing girls and getting drunk, and Soledad (Lorena Enríquez), a beautiful and ingenuous young girl who falls in love with Gabriel Durán (Juan Soler), the handsome gamester and ex-lover of their greedy step-mother, Cassandra (Alejandra Ávalos), who moves to San Gaspar after winning the hacienda of Don Ignacio Andrade (Arsenio Campos), Julio's closest friend, in a poker game. Don Ignacio's son, Francisco (Roberto Palazuelos), has been in love with Julia, but after discovering that he has become involved with the town harlot, Eva (Mónika Sánchez), Julia spurns him for Gabriel.

Julia doesn't let herself be domesticated by anyone, but despite all the disagreements, she has to admit she is deeply in love with Gabriel. Nevertheless, after she catches him cheating on her with Eva, Julia declines his marriage proposal. Although she claims to utterly hate him, she eventually accepts to marry him, only to save her family's fortune that Don Julio foolishly lost in a bet with Gabriel. At first their marriage is full of fights and hateful words as Julia is determined to make Gabriel pay for his faults, but her heart softens after giving birth to their son. Things seem to look up for them; and they start living as a normal couple, but the real troubles are yet to come.

== Cast ==
=== Main ===
- Patricia Manterola as Julia Montaño
- Juan Soler as Gabriel Durán
- Eric del Castillo as Chepe Estrada
- Roberto Palazuelos as Francisco Andrade
- Mónika Sánchez as Eva Flores "La Mariposa"
- Jorge Vargas as Julio Montaño
- Dacia González as Clara García
- Roberto Ballesteros as Justo Hernández

=== Recurring ===
- Socorro Bonilla as Lázara Jiménez
- Tony Bravo as Camilo Beltrán
- Gustavo Rojo as Lawyer Leonardo de la Rosa
- Eduardo Liñán as Lawyer San Juan
- Arsenio Campos as Ignacio Andrade
- Maleni Morales as Esther de Andrade
- Alfonso Iturralde as Professor Homero Preciado
- Roberto D'Amico as Father Jesús
- Jaime Lozano as Braulio Serrano
- Justo Martínez as Macario Trujillo
- Héctor Sáez as Cayetano Cruz
- Fernando Robles as Marcial
- Alejandro Rábago as Lorenzo Pedraza
- Rafael del Villar as Domingo Ferrer
- Tere López Tarín as Dr. Ivana Sabater
- Zaide Silvia Gutiérrez as Dr. Adriana
- Fabián Robles as Álvaro Montaño
- José María Torre as Luis Pedraza
- Francesca Guillén as Matilde Cruz
- Julio Mannino as Leandro Pedraza
- Lorena Enríquez as Soledad Montaño
- Jan as Dr. Felipe Calzada
- Juan Ángel Esparza as Samuel Cruz
- Benjamín Rivero as Ramón Cabrera
- Elsa Navarrete as Lucero Beltrán
- Carmen Becerra as Nadia Thomas
- Manuela Ímaz as Gracia Ferrer
- Alejandra Ávalos as Cassandra Fragoso

=== Guest star ===
- Marco Muñoz as Dr. Sebastián Ibarrola

== Awards and nominations ==
Year	Association	Category	Nominee(s)	Result
2005	23rd TVyNovelas Awards	Best Telenovela	Angelli Nesma Medina	Nominated
2005	23rd TVyNovelas Awards	Best Actress	Patricia Manterola	Nominated
2005	23rd TVyNovelas Awards	Best Actor	Juan Soler	Nominated
2005	23rd TVyNovelas Awards	Best Antagonist Actress	Mónika Sánchez	Nominated
2005	23rd TVyNovelas Awards	Best Antagonist Actor	Fabián Robles	Won
2005	23rd TVyNovelas Awards	Best Supporting Actress	Dacia González	Nominated
2005	23rd TVyNovelas Awards	Best Supporting Actor	Eric del Castillo	Won
2005	23rd TVyNovelas Awards	Best Musical Theme	"Que seas feliz" by Luis Miguel	Nominated
2005	23rd TVyNovelas Awards	Best Direction	Alfredo Gurrola; Benjamín Cann	Nominated
2006	38th Latin ACE Awards	Most Outstanding Character Actor	Eric del Castillo	Won
