= Plaza de las Estrellas =

Shopping centre in Mexico City

Coordinates: 19.4361°N 99.1715°W

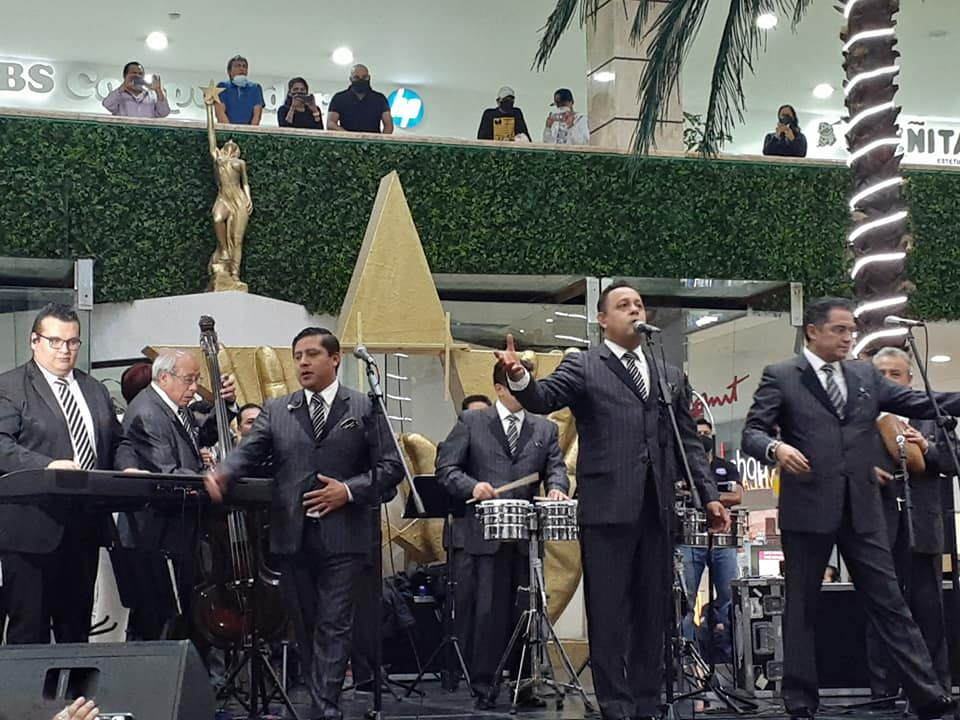

Plaza de las Estrellas is a shopping center located in the northwest part of central Mexico City, inside a triangle created by the crossing of three major thoroughfares: Circuito Interior, Av. Marina Nacional, and Eje 2 Bahía de la Ascención, in Colonia Verónica Anzures, Miguel Hidalgo borough.

The mall was built in 1982. It is best known as the site of the Paseo de las Luminarias, the Mexican equivalent of the Hollywood Walk of Fame. Gloria Funtanet, one of the Plaza's developers, created the Paseo to honor Mexicans and Latin-Americans in showbusiness, most notably the motion picture, television, theatrical, and recording industries, of which Mexico City is the center in Latin America. Since the Paseo's dedication, which coincided with the Plaza's opening, over 1,000 entertainers, mostly from Mexico, have been inducted. The inductees are honored with a star and their handprints embedded on square tiles. The Paseo is located in the upper level of the shopping center, and doubles as the main walkway to and from the stores located on that level.

The Paseo is the Plaza's main attraction. The Plaza is without a major department store anchor, but has a Cinemex movie theater, Sanborns, Smartfit gym, Vips restaurant and several dozen other shops, restaurants, banks, a food court and a hotel (El Hotel del Prado).

== Notable inductees on the Paseo de las Luminarias ==
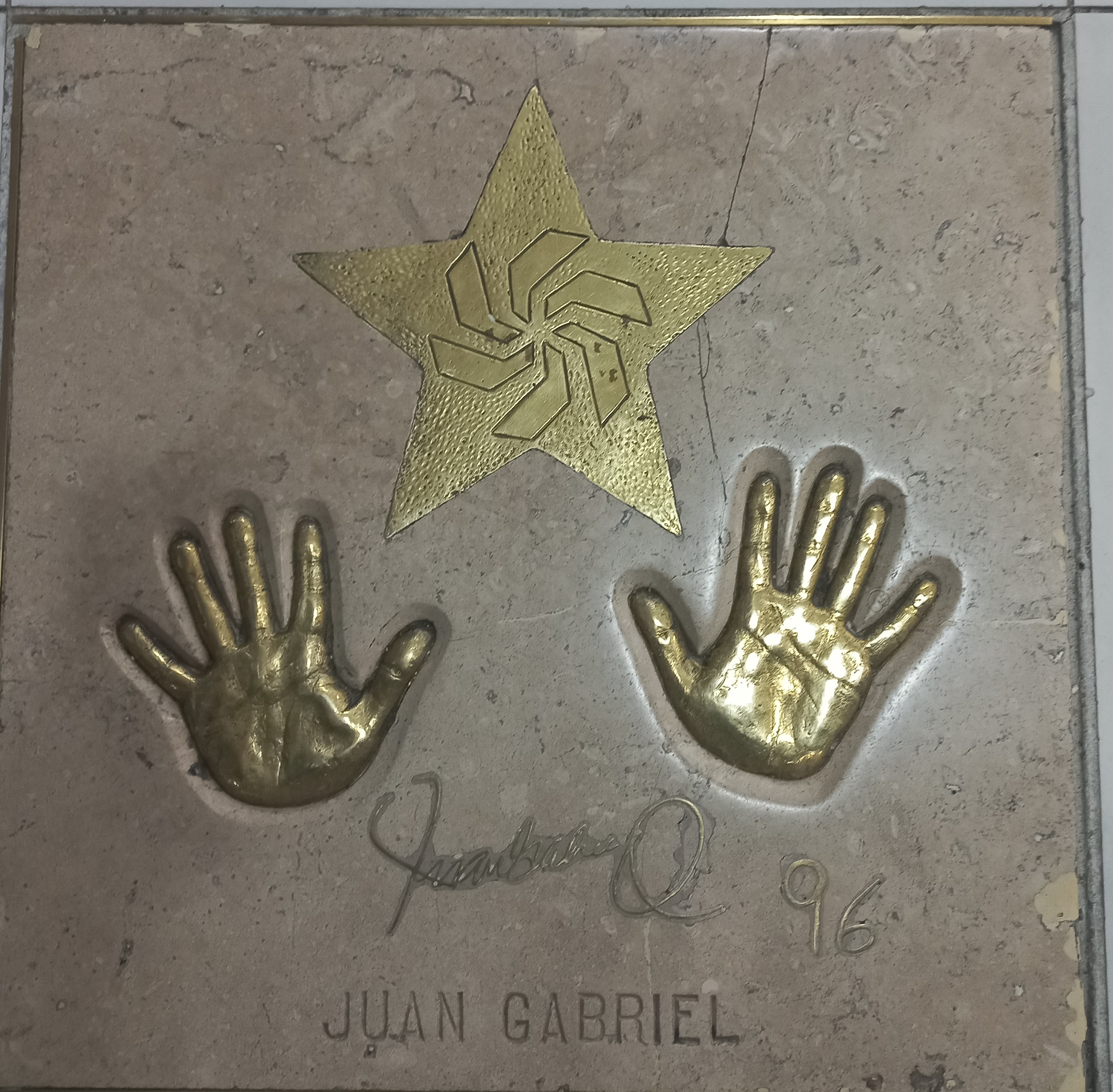
Juan Gabriel

Among the famous entertainers whose handprints and stars have been imbedded into the Paseo are Raúl Velasco, María Elena Velasco, María Félix, Arap Bethke, Cantinflas, Mario Almada, Angélica María and her daughter Angélica Vale, Rocío Dúrcal, Salma Hayek, Daniela Romo, Alaska, Aida Pierce, Alberto Estrella, Alec Von Bargen, Nailea Norvind, Alejandro Fernández, Silvia Pinal and her daughters Alejandra Guzmán and Sylvia Pasquel, Lupita D'Alessio, Thalía, Maribel Guardia, Plácido Domingo, Vicente Fernández, Pepe Aguilar, Danna Paola, Dulce Maria, Laura Flores, Anabel Ferreira, Alejandro Suarez, Nora Velazquez, Alejandra Meyer, Alicia Machado, Ivy Queen, Jorge Ortiz de Pinedo, Carla Estrada, Fernando Colunga, Guillermo Zarur, Lucero, Talina Fernandez, Rosy Martell, Sasha Sokol, Carlos Espejel, Carmen Montejo, Raquel Olmedo, Cesar Costa, Paulina Rubio, Eugenio Derbez, Edith Marquez, Lorena Herrera, Joaquín Bondoni, Maria Duval and her niece Consuelo, Sheyla Tadeo and other famous stars.

== See also ==
- Hollywood Walk of Fame
- List of halls and walks of fame
