= Papá soltero =

Papá soltero (Single Father) is a Mexican television comedy series produced by Luis de Llano Macedo from 1987 to 1994. It starred singer César Costa as well as actors Gerardo Quiroz, Edith Márquez and Luis Mario Quiroz, Jorge Pablo Carrillo.

== Synopsis ==
César Costa plays a fictionalized version of himself, the head of a middle-high class family who happens to be a single father, hence the name of the show. He has two sons and a daughter: Miguel (Gerardo Quiroz), the eldest, Alejandra (Edith Márquez) and Cesarín (Luis Mario Quiroz), the youngest. They have a strong relationship with their maid Gumara (Aurora Alonso). They live in an apartment where they befriend their apartment building's handyman known as "Pocholo" (José Luis Cordero) and Juan (Juan Peláez/Octavio Galindo), their womanizing neighbor who repeatedly gets others into trouble.

== Cast ==
- César Costa as César
- Edith Marquez as Alejandra
- Gerardo Quiroz as Miguel
- Luis Mario Quiroz as Cesarín
- José Luis Cordero as Pocholo
- Aurora Alonso as Gumara
- Claudia Silva

During its six-year run the show had more than 60 guests from among popular stars of the era.

== Awards ==
In 1989 Costa won the TVyNovelas Award for Best Comedic Performance for Papá soltero; the show was also nominated twice for Best Comedy Program but did not win.

== Projected non-television revival ==
In 2018 Costa told El Universal that he planned to revive the series in movie theaters and on stage.
