= 23rd TVyNovelas Awards =

2005 Mexican TV awards

- Date: April 23, 2005
- Location: Mexico D.F.
- Hosted by: René Strickler & Lucero

Highlights
- Most awards: Rubí (7)
- Most nominations: Apuesta por un amor (9); Rubí (9)

Television/radio coverage
- Network: Canal de las Estrellas

The 23rd TVyNovelas Awards were an academy of special awards to the best soap operas and TV shows. The awards ceremony took place on April 23, 2005 in Mexico D.F. The ceremony was televised in Mexico by Canal de las Estrellas.

René Strickler and Lucero hosted the show. Rubí won 7 awards, the most for the evening, including Best Telenovela. Other winners Apuesta por un amor won 2 awards and Inocente de ti and Misión S.O.S won 1 each.

== Summary of awards and nominations ==
Telenovela	Nominations	Awards
Rubí	9	7
Apuesta por un amor	9	2
Mujer de madera	6	0
Misión S.O.S	5	1
Inocente de ti	1	1
Corazones al límite	1	0

== Winners and nominees ==
=== Telenovelas ===
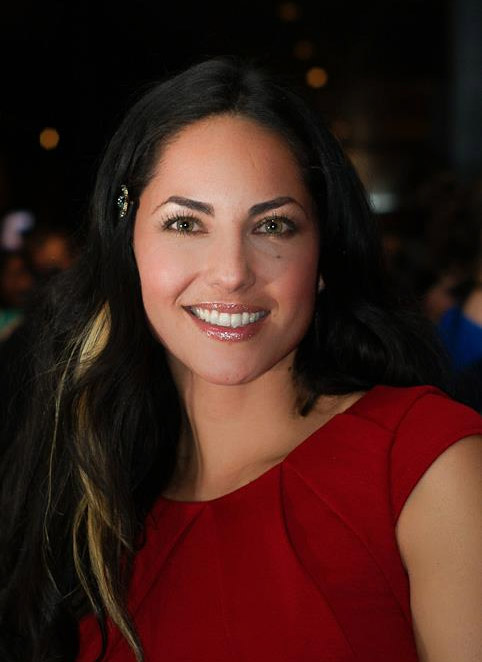
Bárbara Mori, winner for Best Actress.

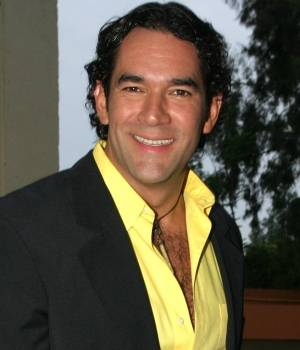
Eduardo Santamarina, winner for Best Actor.

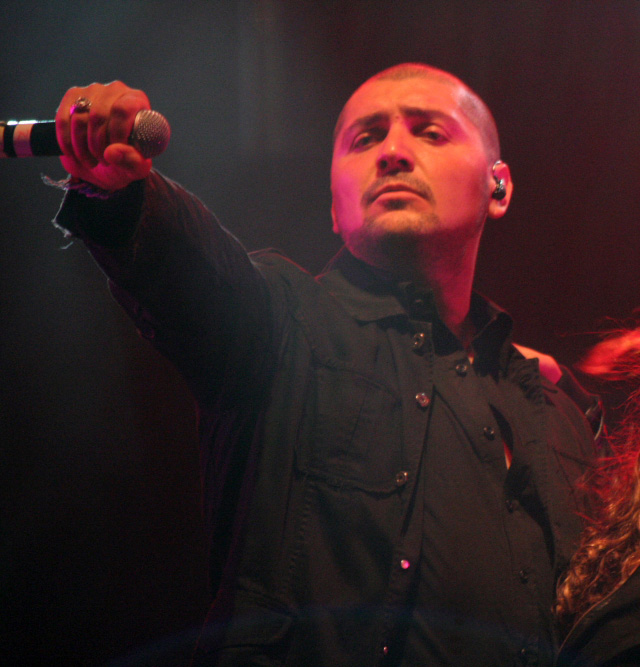
Reyli, winner for Best Musical Theme.

Best Telenovela	Best Musical Theme
Rubí; Apuesta por un amor; Misión S.O.S	"La descarada" — Reyli – Rubí; "Que seas feliz" — Luis Miguel – Apuesta por un amor; "Vivir" — Belinda – Corazones al límite
Best Actress	Best Actor
Bárbara Mori – Rubí; Edith González – Mujer de madera; Patricia Manterola – Apuesta por un amor	Eduardo Santamarina – Rubí; Gabriel Soto – Mujer de madera; Juan Soler – Apuesta por un amor
Best Antagonist Actress	Best Antagonist Actor
Helena Rojo – Inocente de ti; Maya Mishalska – Mujer de madera; Mónika Sánchez – Apuesta por un amor	Fabián Robles – Apuesta por un amor; Carlos Cámara Jr. – Mujer de madera; Manuel Landeta – Rubí
Best Supporting Actress	Best Supporting Actor
Ana Martín – Rubí; Dacia González – Apuesta por un amor; María Sorté – Mujer de madera	Eric del Castillo – Apuesta por un amor; Carlos Bracho – Mujer de madera; Roberto Vander – Rubí
Best Child Performance	Best Direction
Jonathan Becerra – Misión S.O.S; Diego González – Misión S.O.S; Marijose Salazar – Misión S.O.S	Benjamín Cann and Eric Morales – Rubí; Alfredo Gurrola and Benjamín Cann – Apuesta por un amor; Isaías Gómez and Salvador Sánchez – Misión S.O.S

=== Others ===
Best Comedy Program or Series	Best Variety Program
La hora pico; La escuelita VIP; Par de ases	La parodia; Hoy; Otro rollo
Best Special Program	Best Host or Hostess
Teletón México; Festival Acapulco; Tras la verdad	Adal Ramones - Otro rollo; Marco Antonio Regil - Teletón México; Verónica Castro - Big Brother VIP

== Special awards ==
- Telenovela with the Highest Rating in 2004: Rubí
- Award for Excellence: Ernesto Alonso
- Special Award for 25 Years of Artistic Career: Lucero
- Rising Star: África Zavala
