= Cachún cachún ra ra! =

Mexican television series

- Created by: Luis de Llano Macedo
- Starring: Ariane Pellicer; Pedro Damián; Anabel Ferreira; Alma Delfina; Nailea Norvind; Adela Noriega
- Country of origin: Mexico
- Original language: Spanish

Production
- Executive producer: Luis de Llano Macedo

Original release
- Network: Televisa
- Release: 1981 – 1987

¡¡Cachún Cachún Ra-Ra!! was a Mexican comedy series that was produced from 1981 to 1987 for Televisa. ¡¡Cachún Cachún Ra-Ra!! was a teen comedy show whose setting was in high school. In addition to the usual trials and traumas of adolescence, the students of the school had to contend with the wrath of their nasty school principal, a woman who's been dubbed "Godzilla." The title refers to a typical fight cheer often chanted in sports events in Mexico.

The show set the stage for future Hispanic television sitcoms. Many Cachunes became superstars after their time in the show, such as Adela Noriega, Eugenio Derbez, Nailea Norvind, Fernando Arau, Ernesto Laguardia and several others.

== Cast ==
Sortable table
Actor	Role	Year
Viridiana Alatriste	Viri	1981
Pedro Damián	Profr. Buenrostro	1981
Anabel Ferreira	Anabelle	1981
Paco del Toro	Paco	1981
Rosita Pelayo	Rocío	1981
Adriana Laphan	Tina	1981
Jaime Garza	El Pelos/Greñas	1981
Anghel	Rubí	1981–1984
Socorro Bonilla	Profra. Valladares	1981–1984
Alma Delfina	Baby	1981–1984
Alfredo Alegría	Lenguardo	1981–1984
Rodolfo Rodríguez	Calixto	1981–1984
Fernando Arau	Chicho	1981–1985
Lili Garza	Lilí	1981–1985
Roberto Huicochea	Huicho	1981–1985
Ariane Pellicer	Nina la Punk	1981–1985
José Flores	Jagger	1981–1986
Alejandro Ciangherotti	Beto	1981–1986
Gerardo González	Porkirio	1981–1986
Lupita Sandoval	Petunia	1981–1986
Manuel de la Rosa	Profr. Redondon	1981–1987
Alicia Encinas	Miss Ever Green	1981–1987
Mário del Río	El Gori	1981–1987
Hugo Acosta	Popochas	1981–1987
Martha Zabaleta	Profesora Bonilla "Godzilla"	1981–1987
Adrián Ramos	Pepe Celaya	1981–1987
Luis Torner	Profesor Guiguis	1981-1986
Carlos Monden	Papa de Calixto	1981
Miguel Cané	Linus	1981
Maricarmen Vela	Mamá de Baby	1981
Martha Ofelia Galindo	Mama de Petunia	1981
Gloria Jordan	Mama de Paco y Rocío	1981
María Luisa Alcala	Mama de Chicho	1981
Amparito Arozamena	Mama de Lenguardo	1981
Julio Lucena	Papá de Lenguardo	1981
Silvia Pinal	Mama de Viri	1981
Alejandra Meyer	Mama de Calixto	1981
Mario Bezares	Hermano de Calixto	1981
Ligia Escalante	Susu	1982–1984
José Magaña	Profesor Villafuerte	1982–1987
Alicia Sandoval	Venus	1982–1987
José DeMara	Tito	1983–1987
Patricia Thomas	Tammy	1984–1985
Norma Yolanda López	Mini	1984–1986
Ivonne de la Torre	Piraña 1	1984–1986
Mariza Fernández	Piraña 2	1984–1986
Ari Sax	Ari	1984–1986
Roberto Garza	Polo	1984–1986
Eduardo Bernach	Fricky Ricardo	1984–1986
Manuel Gurría	Inspector Romualdo Tenorio	1984–1987
Adela Noriega	Adela	1984–1987
Eugenio Derbez	Eugenio	1984–1987
Daniela Castro	Debbie	1984–1987
Luis Ernesto Cano	Narciso	1984–1987
Malena Castillo	Puri	1984–1987
Itzel Ramos	Nicole	1984–1987
Laura Luz	Olimpia	1984–1987
Alejandro Iriarte	Nano	1984–1987
Alejandra Espejo	Porfra. Espejo	1984–1987
América Gabriela	América	1984–1985
Omar Fierro	Titán	1984–1987
Ernesto Laguardia	Neto	1985–1987
Nailea Norvind	Aïda	1985–1987
Ari Telch	David	1985–1987

== Awards ==
=== TVyNovelas Awards ===
Year	Category	Result
1983	Best Comedy Program	Won
1984	Best Comedy Program	Won
1985	Best Comedy Program	Won
