= Nora Salinas =

Mexican actress and model (born 1976)

- Born: Alicia Nora Ortiz Salinas; 1976 (age 49–50); Monterrey, Mexico
- Occupations: Actress; former model
- Years active: 1994–present

Nora Alicia Ortiz Salinas (born 1976) is a Mexican actress and model. She has appeared in numerous soap operas, several plays and film "Cicatrices" for which she won a "Diosa de Plata" award as New Actress.

== Career ==
Salinas was born in Monterrey, Mexico. She first obtained international recognition in the telenovela Esmeralda alongside Leticia Calderon, as the damsel in distress Graciela.

She then played Fedra in the telenovela "Rosalinda", and then played in a telenovela for children, Carita de Angel.

== Filmography ==
=== Films ===
Year	Title	Role	Notes
2005	Cicatrices	Clara	Debut film

=== Television ===
Year	Title	Role	Notes
1994	Agujetas de color de rosa	Jessica	Television debut
1996	Confidente de secundaria	Bianca	Supporting Role
1997	Esmeralda	Graciela	Co-protagonist
1999–2006	Mujer, Casos de la Vida Real	Various roles	18 episodes
1999	Rosalinda	Fedra Pérez Romero	Supporting role
2000	DKDA: Sueños de juventud	Leticia del Rosal	Main Antagonist
2000–2001	Carita de ángel	Estefanía Larios de Gamboa / Aunt Wigs	Co-protagonist
2001	María Belén	Ana del Río	Protagonist
2001	Navidad sin fin	Alejandra	Protagonist
2004	Amy, la niña de la mochila azul	Dr. Emilia Álvarez-Vega	Protagonist
2005	Sueños y caramelos	Lupita	Supporting Role
2006	La fea más bella	Carolina Ángeles	Co-protagonist
2007	Destilando Amor	Karen	Special appearance
2007	Amor sin maquillaje	Adriana	
2008	Fuego en la sangre	Sarita Elizondo Acevedo	Co-Protagonist
2009	Tiempo final	Cristina Sarmiento	Episode: "Periodista"
2009–2010	Atrévete a soñar	Herself	3 episodes
2011	Como dice el dicho	Elena	Episode: "Quien mucho amenaza"
2011	Historias delirantes	Susana	Episode: "La adivina"
2012	Un refugio para el amor	Aurora	3 episodes
2013	Nueva vida	Clara	2 episodes
2013	La Tempestad	Rebeca	Co-Protagonist
2014	La malquerida	Juliana Palacios	Antagonist
2015	Amores con trampa	Estefany del Río	Main Antagonist
2017	El bienamado	Dulcina Samperio	Co-Protagonist
2018	Hijas de la luna	Esmeralda	Recurring Role
2019	Por amar sin ley	Raquel Campos	Special Appearance (season 1)
2018-2019	Simón dice	Diana	Main cast
2020	La mexicana y el güero	Helena	Co-protagonist

== Awards and nominations ==
=== TVyNovelas Awards ===
Year	Category	Telenovela	Result
1997	Best Female Revelation	Confidente de secundaria	Nominated
1998	Best Co-star Actress	Esmeralda	Won
2000	Best Co-star Actress	Rosalinda	Nominated
2007	Best Co-star Actress	La fea más bella	Nominated

=== Premios Diosa de Plata ===
Year	Category	Telenovela	Result
2006	Best Female Revelation	Cicatrices	Won

== As herself ==
Year	Title	TV-Show
2004	Premios TVyNovelas	Herself
2004	El effecto dominó	Herself
2004	Big Brother VIP: México	Herself
2004	Big Brother VIP 3	Herself
2005	Celebremos México: Para amarte más	Herself
2005	Lo que no vio de premios - TVyNovelas	Herself
2007	Premios TVyNovelas	Herself
