= Sin pecado concebido =

Mexican telenovela

- Created by: Carlos Olmos; Enrique Serna
- Starring: Angélica Rivera; Carlos Ponce; Sergio Goyri; Itatí Cantoral; María Sorté
- Theme music composer: Carlos Ponce; Joel Someillan
- Opening theme: "Concebido sin pecado" by Carlos Ponce
- Country of origin: Mexico
- Original language: Spanish
- No. of episodes: 88

Production
- Executive producer: José Alberto Castro
- Production company: Televisa

Original release
- Network: Canal de las Estrellas
- Release: May 28 – September 28, 2001

Sin pecado concebido (English: Blameless Love) is a Mexican telenovela produced by José Alberto Castro for Televisa in 2001.

The telenovela stars Angélica Rivera, Carlos Ponce, Sergio Goyri, Itatí Cantoral and María Sorté.

== Cast ==
=== Main ===
- Angélica Rivera as Mariana Campos Ortiz
- Carlos Ponce as Adrián Martorel Ibáñez
- Sergio Goyri as Emiliano Martorel Ochoa
- Itatí Cantoral as Raquel Villavicencio Serrano
- María Sorté as Amparo Ibáñez de Martorel

=== Also main ===
- Beatriz Aguirre as Doña Salud Rojas vda. de Villavicencio
- Joaquín Cordero as Padre Gonzalo
- Magda Guzmán as Eva Santana
- Aurora Molina as Madre Ángeles
- Pilar Pellicer as Dolores "Loló" de la Barcena y de Teresa
- Rosa María Bianchi as Dra. Carmen Albán
- David Ostrosky as Diego Enrique Castellanos
- Ana Bertha Espín as Flor Gutiérrez de Martorel
- Andrea Torre as Arcelia Guizar Albán
- Gerardo Albarrán as Ing. Raúl Platas
- Roxana Saucedo as Dr. Mendoza
- Mané Macedo as Reyna
- Juan Carlos Casasola as Sergio Orozco
- Sebastián Rulli as Marco Vinicio Martorel Gutiérrez
- Ivonne Corona as Ana Luisa Ortiz de Campos
- Rafael Amaya as Cástulo Campos Ortiz
- José Antonio Ferral as Lupe
- Luis Roberto Guzmán as Álvaro Godoy
- Montserrat Oliver as Monserrat España
- Juan Soler as Octavio Allende

=== Supporting cast ===
- Orlando Carrió as Claudio Martorel Ochoa
- Juan Peláez as Anselmo Campos
- Delia Casanova as Hermana Jovita
- Roberto Ballesteros as Teniente Epigmenio Nava
- Luis Gatica as Dr. Gerardo Garduño

== Awards and nominations ==
Year	Award	Category	Nominee	Result
2002	20th TVyNovelas Awards	Best Telenovela	José Alberto Castro	Nominated
2002	20th TVyNovelas Awards	Best Actress	Angélica Rivera	Nominated
2002	20th TVyNovelas Awards	Best Antagonist Actress	Itatí Cantoral	Won
2002	20th TVyNovelas Awards	Best Antagonist Actor	Sergio Goyri	Nominated
2002	20th TVyNovelas Awards	Best Leading Actress	Beatriz Aguirre	Nominated
2002	20th TVyNovelas Awards	Best Leading Actor	Joaquín Cordero	Nominated
2002	Bravo Awards	Best Leading Actress	Beatriz Aguirre	Won
2002	Bravo Awards	Best Male Revelation	Luis Roberto Guzmán	Won
2002	El Heraldo de México Awards	Male Revelation	Rafael Amaya	Nominated
