= Duelo de pasiones (2006 TV series) =

Mexican telenovela

- Genre: Telenovela; Romance; Drama
- Created by: Hilda Morales de Allouis
- Based on: Flor del Campo
- Written by: Marcia del Río; Claudia Velazco; Martha Jurado; Ricardo Tejeda
- Directed by: Pepe Rendón
- Starring: Erika Buenfil; Ludwika Paleta; Sergio Goyri; Pablo Montero; Fabiola Campomanes
- Opening theme: "Insensible a Ti" by Alicia Villarreal
- Composer: Alicia Villarreal
- Country of origin: Mexico
- Original language: Spanish
- No. of episodes: 125

Production
- Executive producer: Juan Osorio
- Production locations: Televisa San Ángel; Mexico City, Mexico; Veracruz, Mexico
- Camera setup: Multi-camera
- Running time: 21-22 minutes (episodes 1-20, 131-140); 41-44 minutes (episode 21-130)
- Production company: Televisa

Original release
- Network: Canal de las Estrellas
- Release: April 17 – October 27, 2006

Related
- Barrera de amor; Amar sin límites; Regina Carbonell; Pobre señorita Limantour

Duelo de pasiones (English: Duel of Passions) is a Mexican telenovela produced by Juan Osorio for Televisa. The telenovela based on radionovela Flor del Campo. It premiered on April 17, 2006, and ended on October 27, 2006.

Erika Buenfil, Ludwika Paleta and Pablo Montero starred as protagonists, while Sergio Goyri, Fabiola Campomanes, Alejandro Ávila and Rafael Rojas starred as antagonists. Zaide Silvia Gutiérrez and Ana Martin starred as stellar performances.

== Plot ==
Álvaro Montellano receives a letter addressed for his wife and written by his farmhand, José Gómez. Upon reading it he thinks his wife is in love with the farmhand and was planning to run away. In reality, the letter was meant for his sister Mariana Montellano, who loves José and even has a daughter with him, but Alfonsina, who is still in love with Álvaro, intercepted it and made him believe it was for his wife. Álvaro has a disease called celotipia, caused by a traumatic experience as a child when his father committed suicide after learning his wife had cheated on him with their farmhand.

Consumed by jealousy and hatred toward his wife and her affair, he shuns her and their daughter, Alina, and exiles his wife to another, Sierra Escondida, where she continues to suffer his abuse and humiliation. Believing Alina to be the result of this liaison and not his daughter, Álvaro threatens the life of Alina's mother and forces Alina to live in a cave, leaving her in the care of the local healer, Luba and her son Gaspar, while Soledad. Here, Alina becomes known by the name of 'Flor del Campo'.

To make matters worse, before being taken away by her father, Alina had met Emilio Valtierra, a military officer, at a party. They both had fallen in love and had promised to meet each other in a cafe, a date which Alina never made. His girlfriend, Thelma, looking for Emilio, falls prey to Gaspar, and in a drunken frenzy sleeps with him. Thelma makes Emilio believe she is carrying his child, and he accepts staying with her.

Two years pass and Emilio still believes Alina left him. When he is assigned to a mission on Sierra Escondida, he meets Flor del Campo, and does not recognize her as Alina, due to her simple dress. Álvaro, wanting Alina to suffer, makes Emilio believe she died in an accident. Emilio believes him, and as soon as he sees Flor del Campo (really Alina), he thinks its Álvaro's illegitimate daughter and initially makes her suffer because of what Alina did to him. Pretty soon the couple engages in a Duel of Pasions as they try to fight for their love even though others stand in their way.

Later, Emilio learns that Flor is really Alina after Alina goes into his house to get back her heart necklace which was the one he had given her at the beginning of the story. He tries to take her but she refuses to let him help after being threatened by her father saying that he will kill her mother but they ended up together as Alina’s father dies in quicksand and Emillo and Alina have two children together.

== Cast ==
=== Main ===
- Erika Buenfil as Soledad Fuentes Montellano
- Ludwika Paleta as Alina Montellano Fuentes/Flor del Campo
- Pablo Montero as Emilio Valtierra Beltrán
- Sergio Goyri as Álvaro Montellano
- Fabiola Campomanes as Thelma Castelo de Valtierra
- Ana Martín as Luba López
- Rafael Rojas as Máximo Valtierra
- Alejandro Avila as Orlando Villaseñor

=== Supporting ===
- Rene Gomez as Gaspar López
- José María Torre as Ángel Valtierra Beltrán
- Jorge de Silva as José Gómez
- Liz Vega as Coral
- Alejandra Procuna as Mariana Montellano de Gómez
- Joana Brito as Adela
- Ana Brenda Contreras as Claudia
- Tania Vazquez as Carla Sánchez
- David Ostrosky as Elías Bernal
- Isaura Espinoza as Blanca de Bernal
- Aída Pierce as Rebeca Castelo
- Eduardo Rivera as Hugo Torres
- Ximena Herrera as Rosa de Valtierra
- Rafael Hernán as Santos Valtierra García
- Zaide Silvia Gutiérrez as Vera
- Luis Uribe as Jaime
- Rafael Valderrama as Granillo
- Fernando Robles as Braulio
- Jaime Lozano as Rutilio
- Carlos Ignacio as Padre Cristobal
- Luis Reynoso as Arcadio
- Mariana Ríos as Dr. Aída Cortés
- Theo Tapia as Dr. Vásquez
- Rafael del Villar as Dr. Ricardo Fonseca
- Alicia Villareal as Raquel
- Humberto Elizondo as Lic. Mauro Peña
- Patricia Martínez as Malena
- Xavier Ortíz as Rodrigo Ochoa
- Ricardo Vera as General Ochoa
- Juan Verduzco as Vargas
- Nashla Aguilar as Gaby
- Flor Procuna as Tina

== Awards ==
Year	Award	Category	Nominee	Result
2006	Premios Califa de Oro	Best Performance	Rafael Rojas	Won
2007	25th TVyNovelas Awards	Best Antagonist Actress	Fabiola Campomanes	Nominated
