= Miguel Cané (actor) =

Mexican actor and journalist

Miguel Cané (born 9 June 1974) is a Mexican actor and journalist, who began as a child actor in the 1980s. Notable films include Otra vuelta de tuerca (1981), Mariana, Mariana (1987) and an uncredited role as a boy in David Lynch's Dune (1984). Today he earns a living as a newspaper editor in Mexico City.
