= María Luisa Alcalá =

Mexican actress (1942–2016)

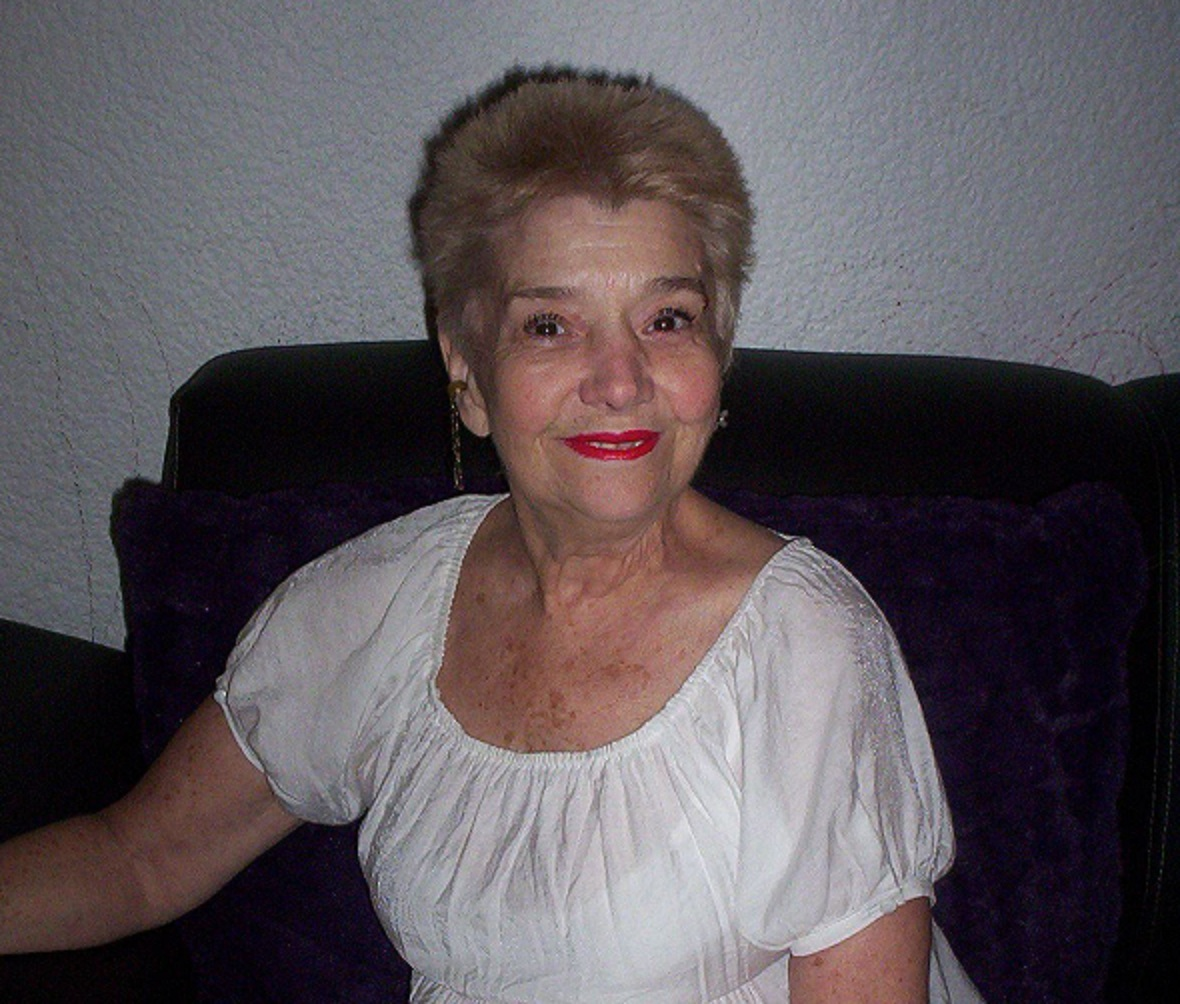
- Alcalá in October 2012
- Born: 26 March 1942; Mexico City, Mexico
- Died: 21 February 2016 (aged 73); Mexico City, Mexico
- Occupation: Actress
- Years active: 1969–2016

María Luisa Alcalá (26 March 1942 – 21 February 2016), was a Mexican actress and director.

== Life ==
She became known for playing Malicha in El Chavo del Ocho.

Alcalá has made outstanding performances in telenovelas like Esmeralda, La usurpadora and El privilegio de amar. She served as host of two virtual stations in Mexico, working in Radio Hits Mix with its "Mix Stories of Grandma" and in DementeRadio.com with its "Tell me a story" productions by Juan Carlos Aguilar, producer and manager of María Luisa Alcalá, where he has interviewed personalities such as Eugenia León, Julio Vega, Lady Sensation, Beatriz Moreno, Gabriela Fernández, Evangelina Martínez, Ernesto Gómez Cruz, Polo Ortín, among others.

Alcalá created a work with Evangelina Martínez called "Tell me a story by Red Rice" on tour throughout Mexico. She directed Investigador privado... muy privado, Violación and La Alacrana. She is famous for the roles of Socorrito in Esmeralda, Filomena in La usurpadora and Malicha in El Chavo. She also played Claudia the maid in the sitcom Dr. Cándido Pérez.

Alcalá died on 21 February 2016 at the age of 73.

== Filmography ==
Year	Title	Role	Notes
1948	Los tres huastecos		
1969	El golfo		
1974	El Chavo del Ocho	Malicha	TV series
1976	El rey	Anastasia	
1976	La palomilla al rescate	Hermana de Pedro	
1984	Historia de payasos		
1986	Ese loco, loco hospital		
1986	La Alacrana		
1986	La lechería		
1986	Casos de alarma	Verdulera	
1987	Relampago	Fufurra	
1987	Duro y parejo en la casita de pecado		
1987	Dr. Cándido Pérez	Claudia	TV series
1988	Los plomeros y las ficheras		
1988	Un paso al más aca	Lupe	
1989	Violación	Agustina	
1989	Las borrachas		
1989	Barroco		
1989	Peligro paradas continuas		
1989	Los cuatrillizos		
1990	El inocente y las pecadoras		
1990	Investigador privado... muy privado		
1991	Cándido Pérez, especialista en señoras	Claudia	
1992	Cándido de día, Pérez de noche	Claudia	
1992	Borrachas de pulqueria	Perrorra	
1993	La loteria	Rich Woman	
1994	A ritmo de salsa		
1997	Esmeralda	Doña Socorro "Socorrito"	137 episodes
1998	La usurpadora	Filomena	102 episodes
1998-1999	El privilegio de amar	Remedios López	32 epsidoes
1999	Reclusorio III		
1999	Los 6 mandamientos de la risa		
2001	Nuria y el fantasma		
2004	Amy, la niña de la mochila azul	Virginia Salazar	TV series
2005	La madrastra	Fanny	
2005	Bajo el mismo techo	Quesadillera	TV series
2008	La rosa de Guadalupe	Nicanora	TV series
