= Alejandra Meyer =

Mexican actress

Martha Alejandra Meyer (February 26, 1937 – November 7, 2007) was a Mexican telenovela actress. Additionally, she appeared in over 90 films throughout her career and many telenovelas, including Serafín and Niña amada mía. She first gained fame in Mexican television programs such as Dr. Cándido Pérez, where she appeared opposite actor Jorge Ortiz de Pinedo. Her last work was in the telenovela series Yo amo a Juan Querendón and Vecinos.

Alejandra Meyer was born on February 26, 1937, in Tuxtla Gutiérrez, Chiapas. She died of heart failure at the age of 70 on November 7, 2007, in Mexico City. Before her death she was featured in the book Televisa Presenta, which celebrated fifty years of network programming.

For her work in television, Meyer was inducted into the Paseo de las Luminarias.

== Selected filmography ==
- Pablo and Carolina (1957)
- Love in the Shadows (1960)
- The White Sister (1960)
