= La parodia =

La parodia (English: The Parody) is a Mexican parody television series produced by Televisa for the Canal de las Estrellas network. The cast originally included Arath de la Torre Angélica Vale and Gisella Aboumrad. After Vale left the show to star in La Fea Más Bella, Roxana Castellanos took her place as the female parodist. The series parodied many telenovelas, films, and pop-culture themes of Mexico.
