= La fea más bella =

Mexican telenovela

- Genre: Telenovela; Comedy
- Based on: Yo soy Betty, la fea by Fernando Gaitán
- Written by: Palmira Olguín
- Directed by: Sergio Jiménez; Eduardo Mesa
- Starring: Angélica Vale; Jaime Camil; Juan Soler; Angélica María; Patricia Navidad; José José; Sergio Mayer; Julissa; Nora Salinas; Elizabeth Álvarez; Carlos Bracho
- Opening theme: "La fea más bella" by Jorge Villamizar & Margarita; "Aquí estaré" by Angélica Vale
- Ending theme: "El club de las feas" by Banda El Recodo; "Tu belleza es un misterio" by Angélica Vale and Jaime Camil
- Country of origin: Mexico
- Original language: Spanish
- No. of episodes: 300

Production
- Executive producer: Rosy Ocampo
- Running time: 42–45 minutes

Original release
- Network: Canal de las Estrellas
- Release: January 23, 2006 – February 25, 2007

La Fea Más Bella ("The Most Beautiful Ugly Girl“) is a Mexican telenovela produced by Televisa. It is a Mexican version of the popular Colombian telenovela Yo soy Betty, la fea.

== Plot ==
Letty, the protagonist of La Fea Más Bella (The Most Beautiful Ugly Girl), is initially turned down for a job at Conceptos, a Mexican modeling and advertising company, due to her appearance. However, the president, Fernando Mendiola, hires her because she is overqualified. Letty works hard to prove herself with the help of El Club de las Feas (The Club of the Uglies). She becomes Fernando's right hand and develops a crush on him, despite his womanizing ways and engagement to Marcia Villaroel. Loyal to Fernando, Letty helps him create a false company to keep Conceptos in debt to them rather than the banks, keeping the secret between her, Fernando, and the vice president, Omar Carvajal.

To manage the false company, Lety hires her best friend, Tomas Mora. To hide her crush on Fernando from her friends, she pretends Tomas is her secret crush. Fernando and Omar learn that Tomas is managing the finances and mistakenly think Lety loves him. Omar convinces Fernando to make Lety fall in love with him to prevent her from giving the company to Tomas. Though reluctant and feeling guilty, Fernando goes along with the plan. Lety is surprised by Fernando's attention and affection, and despite her fears, falls in love with him. Fernando, despite his initial reservations, starts to fall for Lety as well. Marcia and Omar leave for a work trip to Germany, allowing Fernando and Lety to enjoy their time together. Eventually, Lety discovers the truth behind their relationship.

Lety finds a letter from Omar to Fernando, mocking him for seducing her to save Conceptos. Heartbroken, she pretends to give Tomas romantic attention, making Fernando jealous. Realizing her actions hurt her too, Lety ends the game. After learning Omar and Fernando plan to send her away, she reveals the letter and Conceptos' true financial state at a quarterly meeting. The council discovers she owns Conceptos through a dummy company, Filmo Imagen. Lety resigns, leaves signed documents, and runs away to Acapulco with her friend Carolina Ángeles, who hires her.

There, she meets a part-time fisherman and chef named Aldo Domenzaín, who saves her (literally) and helps her realize her true potential. Fernando is devastated when she leaves, and loses a part of himself. He obsesses over her, wondering where she left to and if she will come back. Lety is adamant about not wanting anything to do with Conceptos, but she eventually has to come home and is forced by her father to fix the mistakes that she and Fernando made.

When Lety returns to Conceptos as its full owner, she realizes she must restore the company to its former glory before leaving without guilt. Aldo follows her, hoping to win her love, but faces challenges as Fernando refuses to let her go. Fernando maintains a relationship with Marcia, unsure if Lety will accept him. Despite his efforts to prove his love, Lety, feeling betrayed, struggles to believe him and suppresses her feelings for him.

Frustrated with his inability to convince Lety of his love and feeling his presence is disruptive, Fernando decides to resign to allow Conceptos to move forward. His mother convinces Marcia to tell Lety the truth: that Fernando truly loves her. Marcia reluctantly does so, leading to a reconciliation between Lety and Fernando. They work together to revive Conceptos in honor of its co-founders, the Villaroel family. Lety and Fernando reunite and embrace, but just as they start to move towards their happy ending, Aldo reappears, and Lety realizes she loves him too.

Throughout these events, Lety undergoes a dramatic transformation in her appearance, attends the wedding of both a long-time enemy and a friend, and appears on a television show as a diva. Meanwhile, Fernando experiences his own transformation, realizing the errors of his womanizing ways. He ends his relationship with Marcia and becomes Lety's assistant to show his seriousness about his work and his genuine love for her.

Lety decides that, despite loving both Aldo and Fernando, Aldo has never hurt her. She prepares to marry Aldo and puts Marcia in charge of Conceptos. However, when Fernando plans to leave for Brazil to escape his unrequited love, Lety realizes she truly loves and wants to marry Fernando. Aldo accepts this. The story ends with Fernando taking Aldo's place at the wedding, and he and Lety marry, recognizing Aldo as the angel who helped them reunite.

== Audience ==
=== Mexico ===
La Fea Más Bella was the soap opera with the most watched finale in the history of Mexico, with a growing audience. In his last chapter, the audience of 43 points (62.8 nationally) and 19 million 200 thousand people from Media (19,200,000 viewers), overcame the transmission of Oscar 2007 with 9 points (14.9 in every country), displayed at the same time by TV Azteca. In an unprecedented end on a Sunday, lasting three hours. Was considered the best television series in 2007 due to its good ratings, which were not affected even after the extension of the novel. His first came from redisplay by March 2007 and again on July 14, 2014, replacing the rerun of Soy tu dueña. The last episode was broadcast on March 7, 2015, with Rubí replacing one half-hour it on March 9, 2015.

=== United States ===
Also achieved ratings success in the United States, constantly won the WB and UPN stations, displayed on the Spanish channel but seen in the country, Univision (3 million viewers), which at the time managed to defeat the CBS, NBC and ABC respectively, with the exception of Fox and the "America's Got Talent" on NBC. Came to get 21.3 points (4.6 million) and then 25.3 points. With 7.4 million viewers an episode, was the 15th most watched program in the country, in addition to achieving 4th position nationwide audience, then the 2nd, becoming the most watched soap opera in the Nielsen rankings. Univision broadcast 2 hour episodes of La Fea Más Bella weekday at 12md/11c from September 13, 2010, to April 15, 2011.

== Filming ==
Tapings of La fea más bella began on December 9, 2005, at Televisa San Ángel. Jaime Camil had to abandon his role in a Broadway play to record the show. Angélica Vale needed to lose weight 20 kilos to play the role of Lety. The tapings lasted about 8 hours but reached up to 18 hours daily, which was extended for 14 months. Beside the Banda El Recodo, Vale recorded a music video for the theme "El club de las feas" in a well known restaurant in Mexico City.

During the month of July 2006, Televisa hosted events during the FIFA World Cup in Germany, for which several actors from the cast traveled to record some scenes from the soap opera, and presented a show before 15,000 people.

=== Problems ===
Angélica Vale had an infection caused by salmonella that made her cancel a promotional trip to New York City. In recording a scene where she throws plates and glasses, the actress cut her finger and needed to rebuild 70% of the tendon of her left hand, which prevented her from returning to the studio for three weeks.

Vale suffered from fatigue in during filming. "She didn't faint, but she was very sick. She was overwhelmed by the job since the show records on Sunday and she had little time to rest. She already had chronic fatigue," said her mother, actress Angélica Maria.

In January 2007, Vale again underwent medical treatment and was diagnosed with typhoid, for which she needed a strong antibiotic and rest.

== DVD releases ==
La Fea Más Bella was released in stores and online on February 19, 2008, in a short version, consisting of 14 chapters, with durations ranging from 1 hour to 1 hour and 30 minutes to about 700 minutes total in 3 DVDs. Another version, also edited, was launched with an additional 250 minutes and was distributed on 4 DVDs.

== Reception ==
The Mexican version drew the most critical attention. In the United States, Angélica Vale, characterized as Letty, made a cameo on Ugly Betty as a secretary in the North American Betty's consulting dentist. In Brazil, SBT broadcast the series in 2006 and again in 2014, reaching record audiences. Rede Record produced a version titled Bela, a Feia ("Beauty, the ugly"). In 2009 it was dubbed into Arabic and aired on MTV Lebanon as Letty instead of La Fea Más Bella.

== Awards and nominations ==
| Year | Award | Category | Nominated | Result |
|---|---|---|---|---|
| 2007 | TVyNovelas Awards | Best Telenovela of the Year | Rosy Ocampo | Won |
| 2007 | TVyNovelas Awards | Best Actress | Angélica Vale | Won |
| 2007 | TVyNovelas Awards | Best Actor | Jaime Camil | Nominated |
| 2007 | TVyNovelas Awards | Best Antagonist Actress | Patricia Navidad | Nominated |
| 2007 | TVyNovelas Awards | Best Antagonist Actor | Raúl Magaña | Nominated |
| 2007 | TVyNovelas Awards | Best Leading Actress | Angélica María | Nominated |
| 2007 | TVyNovelas Awards | Best Leading Actor | Carlos Bracho | Nominated |
| 2007 | TVyNovelas Awards | Best Supporting Actress | Elizabeth Álvarez | Won |
| 2007 | TVyNovelas Awards | Best Supporting Actress | Nora Salinas | Nominated |
| 2007 | TVyNovelas Awards | Best Supporting Actor | Agustín Arana | Nominated |
| 2007 | TVyNovelas Awards | Best Supporting Actor | Sergio Mayer | Nominated |
| 2007 | TVyNovelas Awards | Best Supporting Actor | José José | Won |
| 2007 | TVyNovelas Awards | Best Stellar Young Actor or Actress | Erick Guecha | Nominated |
| 2007 | TVyNovelas Awards | Best Direction | Salvador Garcini and Rodrigo G. H. Zaunbos | Won |
| 2007 | TVyNovelas Awards | Best Musical Theme | "El club de las feas", Banda El Recodo | Won |
| 2007 | TVyNovelas Awards | Favorite Program of the Public | Rosy Ocampo | Won |

== Soundtrack ==
La Fea Más Bella (Soundtrack de la Telenovela)

Soundtrack album by La fea más bella cast
- Released: February 14, 2006 (Digital); June 6, 2006 (CD)
- Genre: Latin pop
- Length: 41:57 (Digital); 37:07 (CD)
- Labels: Warner Music Mexico; EMI Televisa Music

The soundtrack of La fea más bella was released in two separate volumes, one only digital format released on February 14, 2006, by Warner Music Mexico and other in physical format (CD) and digital on June 6 plumb the year by EMI Televisa Music.

=== Track listing ===
Digital edition
| No. | Title | Writer(s) | Performer(s) | Length |
|---|---|---|---|---|
| 1. | "La Fea Más Bella" | Alfonso Lizárraga; Javier Manriquez; Jorge Villamizar | Jorge Villamizar; Margarita | 3:41 |
| 2. | "Tu Belleza Es Un Misterio" | | Angélica Vale; Jaime Camil | 2:45 |
| 3. | "Dueña de Mi Vida" | | Angels | 3:22 |
| 4. | "Se Busca Un Hombre" | | Niurka | 2:50 |
| 5. | "El Club de Las Feas" | Bruno Danzza; Lizárraga; Manriquez | Banda el Recodo | 2:46 |
| 6. | "Aquí Estaré" | | Angélica Vale | 3:39 |
| 7. | "Canallá" | | Margarita | 4:13 |
| 8. | "La Secretaria" | | Banda Machos | 2:53 |
| 9. | "Mi Bom Bom" | | La Sonora Margarita | 3:58 |
| 10. | "Bésela Ya (Con Bacilos)" | | Celso Piña | 3:28 |
| 11. | "Le Gusta el Cu" | | La Sonora Margarita | 3:37 |
| 12. | "La Fea Más Bella - Karaoke" | Lizárraga; Manriquez; Villamizar | | 3:43 |
| Total length: | | | | 41:57 |

CD edition
| No. | Title | Writer(s) | Performer(s) | Length |
|---|---|---|---|---|
| 1. | "La Fea Más Bella" | Alfonso Lizárraga; Javier Manriquez; Jorge Villamizar | Angélica Vale; Jaime Camil | 3:43 |
| 2. | "El Club de Las Feas" | Bruno Danzza; Lizárraga; Manriquez | Banda el Recodo | 2:46 |
| 3. | "Simple" | Eduardo Paz; Adrián Possé | Daniela Romo | 2:55 |
| 4. | "Con Tu Amor" | Juan Gabriel | Pandora | 4:25 |
| 5. | "Haría Hasta lo Imposible" | | El Coyote y Su Banda Tierra Santa | 3:37 |
| 6. | "Sigue Tu Ruta" | | Graciela Beltrán | 2:56 |
| 7. | "La Verdad" | | Los Invasores de Nuevo León | 3:44 |
| 8. | "Que Vuelva Pronto" | Fernando Cibrian | Los Originales de San Juan | 2:58 |
| 9. | "Me Quiero Casar" | Rigo Tovar | Control | 3:13 |
| 10. | "Lucero de Mi Alma" | Eddie Rivas | Emilio Navaira | 3:41 |
| 11. | "Lo Eterno" | | Celso Piña | 3:09 |
| Total length: | | | | 37:07 |
