= Dr. Cándido Pérez =

Mexican television series

- Created by: Abel Santa Cruz
- Developed by: Jorge Ortiz de Pinedo
- Directed by: Carlos Zúñiga
- Starring: Jorge Ortiz de Pinedo; Nuria Bages; Alejandra Meyer; Lupe Vazquez; María Luisa Alcalá
- Theme music composer: Rodrigo Álvarez
- Country of origin: Mexico
- Original language: Spanish
- No. of seasons: 7
- No. of episodes: 248

Production
- Running time: 30 minutes
- Production company: Televisa

Original release
- Network: Canal de las Estrellas
- Release: 1987 – 1993

Dr. Cándido Pérez is a Mexican television sitcom that aired on Televisa's Canal de las Estrellas from 1987 to 1993, starring Jorge Ortiz de Pinedo as the title character. The show is based on the 1962 film Dr. Cándido Pérez, señoras. It was recorded at Televisa San Ángel with a live studio audience.

== Cast ==
=== Main characters ===
- Cándido Pérez (Jorge Ortiz de Pinedo): The main character and protagonist in the series who is a gynecologist always getting nervous and hyper in any situation that goes wrong.
- Silvina Pérez (Nuria Bages): The wife of Cándido Pérez, often very suspicious of her husband.
- Catalina (Alejandra Meyer): The mother of Silvina Pérez and mother-in-law of Cándido Pérez, whom she never gets along with.
- Paula (Lupe Vázquez): Cándido Pérez's assistant nurse in his office.
- Claudia (María Luisa Alcalá): The Pérez family's housekeeper.

=== Recurring characters ===
- Father Camilo (Juan Verduzco): A preacher.
- Inocencio Pérez (David Ramos): Son of Cándido Pérez.
- Perlita Pérez (Georgina Mariana): Daughter of Cándido Pérez.

== Remake ==
On October 22, 2020, Televisa announced that a new version of the series would premiere in 2021. The series would be produced by Pedro Ortiz de Pinedo. Arath de la Torre was set to star as Dr. Cándido Pérez.
