= Yordi Rosado =

- Rosado in 2013
- Born: Yordi Galo Rosado Álvarez; 16 October 1971 (age 55); Mexico City
- Education: Universidad Intercontinental
- Occupations: Television host, writer
- Years active: 1995–present
- Television: Otro Rollo
- Spouse: Rebeca Rodríguez (2003–2011, 2016–2019; divorced)
- Children: 3
- Website: yordirosado.com.mx

Yordi Galo Rosado Álvarez (born 16 October 1971) is a Mexican television host and author.

Born in Mexico City, Rosado studied Communication Sciences at the Universidad Intercontinental, graduating in 1993. He rose to prominence through his work on the variety television show Otro Rollo (1995-2007). Along with Gaby Vargas, he published the book Quiúbole con... in 2005, a youth self-help guide that has since become one of the best-selling books in Mexico, as well as a series of guides. He married Rebeca Rodríguez in 2003 and divorced her in 2011. In 2016, they reconciled, but divorced again in 2019. They have three children.
