= La Carabina de Ambrosio =

1978 Mexican television show

- Written by: Humberto Navarro
- Directed by: Humberto Navarro, Guillermo Núñez de Cáceres
- Starring: César Costa, Gualberto Castro, Chavelo, Beto el Boticario, Gina Montes, Manolo Muñoz
- Narrated by: La Pájara Peggy
- Music by: Quartz
- Country of origin: México
- Original language: Spanish

Production
- Producer: Televisa Chapultepec
- Running time: 22 minutes
- Production company: Televisa

Original release
- Release: 1978 – 1987

La Carabina de Ambrosio is a Mexican television show created and developed by Humberto Navarro, filmed at the Televisa Studios, Chapultepec in Mexico City, from 1978 until 1987. The slogan of the show was "A Magical, Comical, and Musical Variety Show." The show had guest emcees that included César Costa, Paco Stanley, Gualberto Castro, Fito Girón, and Manolo Muñoz. During the hosts' songs, a cast member would interrupt abruptly, leading to the start of a comedy skit. The show featured numerous skits, jokes, and tricks played on the hosts.

Since 2007, the show is in re-runs on TV Clásico. The theme song was Quartz by Quartz.

== Humberto Navarro ==
Humberto Navarro, creator and producer, of La Carabina de Ambrosio, was a young up-and-coming talent of Televisa. He developed La Carabina de Ambrosio with the theme of "you don't know what comes next." There were comedy skits, outrageous magic from equally outrageous magicians, music, entertainers, vedettes all presented out of sequence.

== Gina Montes ==
Navarro knew what the Mexican television audience wanted, yet were too embarrassed to ask for. Navarro started the show with Brazilian dancer Gina Montes. She was a sultry, dark-haired femme fatale who wore a black French-cut leotard with thigh-high high-heeled black boots. This was a scandalous costume for the era and stunned the television public when Gina bumped and grinded while white smoke was pumped in at her feet. She opened and closed the show with her gyrations while the credits rolled. Navarro knew this was an outrageous presentation for conservative Mexican television, but the public loved it. Gina disappeared suddenly from the TV show and from Mexico. No one knew what had happened to her until recently.

His addition of controversial and often meritorious Mexican vedettes to the show, such as Gina Montes and Wanda Seux, and their scandalous costumes (up to this point vedettes were not shown on Mexican television only in nightclubs and bars) brought in the highest rating in Mexican television during the era. The show hit number one in Mexico, and its success skyrocketed Navarro into fame. Another part of the success formula was adding guest entertainers such as, but not limited to, singers César Costa, Manolo Muñoz, and singer/dancer Laura Zapata.

== La Pájara Peggy ==
La pájara Peggy or "Peggy the Bird", a large, bright yellow, gawky bird that looked more like a duck and spoke in an obnoxious voice audaciously interrupting cast member. During the first two years of the show, Navarro himself dressed up in the yellow bird outfit and had outrageous interactions with the emcees, often whacking the unsuspecting emcee over the head with a wing or a kick in the shins with a big webbed foot. These slapstick antics sent the stage hands into uproarious laughter and sent Navarro's bosses into shock. At the time, it was unheard of that a Televisa executive would dress up in a big yellow bird suit and act silly on national television. A memo from the owner of Televisa requested that Navarro find a replacement. Actor/comedian Moisés Suárez replaced Navarro as La pájara Peggy.

== Cast ==
- César Costa ......... Emcee, other roles Padre Chispita, Gulp (a spoof on The Incredible Hulk series starring Bill Bixby), etc.
- Gualberto Castro..... co-Emcee, also sang and played Profe Gualas.
- Fito Girón........... co-Emcee and singer.
- Manolo Muñoz.........co-Emcee and singer.
- Paco Stanley........ co-Emcee, and played Paco Pacorro.
- Alejandro Suárez.... co-Emcee, comedian and played roles as el Simpatias, el Vulgarcito, Supermam, etc.
- Xavier López "Chabelo"......Comedian portrayed Guillo el monaguilllo, Pujitos, etc.
- Roberto Ramírez Garza "Beto El Boticario".... Magician
- Benito Castro..........Kin Kin el Acapulqueño
- Charly Valentino
- Luis de Alba.........Peritos, Maclovio, etc.
- El Mago Frank y Blas ...Magician and ventriloquist
- Gina Montes.....Dancer
- Humberto Navárro y Moisés Suárez........Played the "La pájara Peggy" a huge awkward yellow bird
- Jorge Alberto Riancho ....... co-Emcee
- Jorge Arvizu "el Tata"......... played roles as El Tata, Don Rutilano, Lim Piao, etc.
- Judith Velasco
- Maribel Fernández a.k.a. "La Pelangocha"......Played La Babis.
- Víctor Alcocer
- La Maga Marian.... Played by Mariana E de Castro (esposa de Gualberto Castro).......Magician
- Aida Pierce.....played La nina Aidita, La Enfermera, Virginola, etc.
- Lucila Mariscal

== Legacy ==
In 2012, as a tribute to the classic variety show, Mexican morning talk show Hoy ran a series of segments that recreated famous sketches from Carabina in which the hosts would impersonate the characters and personalities from the original series. For example, long-time host Andrea Legarreta appears as dancer Gina Montes and Paul Stanley (son of Paco Stanley) acts as Chabelo. The recreations proved to be so popular that Hoy brought the series back as a permanent fixture and recently began its fourth season.
