= La hora pico =

Mexican television series

La Hora Pico (English: Rush Hour) is a Mexican television sketch comedy show featured on the channel “Las Estrellas”. It was broadcast from September 2000 to September 2007. The program starred comedians such as Consuelo Duval, Miguel Galvan, Adrian Uribe, Lorena de la Garza, Gustavo Munguia, Reynaldo Rossano, Javier Carranza “El Costeño”, Ariel Manzano, and Ricardo Hill. Carla Estrada and Reynaldo Lopez participated in the production. At the beginning of its broadcast, it was hosted by Andres Garcia and Jaime Camil.

== History ==
At the beginning of the series, the models Jazmin, Ivonne, and Sabelle were the first participants. In April 2001, Jazmin was replaced by Marian, who remained a model from April 2001 to the last episode in September 2007. Then, in early 2002, Sabelle was replaced by Sabrina. Ivonne, Marian, and Sabrina were the models from 2002 to early 2005. In early January 2005, as a result of Sabrina having to leave the country, Ivonne and Marian were the models from January to May 2005. In June, the show found another model, Paola, to take Sabrina's place. Ivonne, Marian, and Paola were the models from June 2005 until the last episode in September 2007. Before the start of each sketch, the models would appear dancing sexy in bikinis or other skimpy outfits (including angel, policewoman, nurse, and cheerleader costumes, etc.). The focus of their costumes was the extensive highlighting of cleavage. The models would also make cameo appearances in sketches, sometimes having lines. When the whole cast went to Acapulco for several episodes in season 3, the models appeared on the beach, dancing in full bikini wear.

Beginning in 2001, the program no longer had a set host and was replaced by familiar guests in each broadcast, including "Resortes", "India Maria", Silvia Pinal, Lucía Méndez, Héctor Suárez, María Victoria, Eugenio Derbez, Kuno Becker, among many other stars in the world of Cinema, Television, and Sport.

Originally, the show was transmitted by Canal de las Estrellas on Thursdays, taking place of the show “Picardía Mexicana” as part of Televisa’s comedy bar. During the time that the show aired, it underwent many schedule changes: initially, it aired at 10:00 PM and later changed to 11:00 pm. In 2002, when the comedy bar titled “Nos Vemos a las 10” appeared, "La Hora Pico" was once again broadcast at 10:00 pm, being the only show to have remained on the comedy bar from 2002 to 2005. That same year, it began airing on Saturdays around 7:00 pm. Finally, in 2007, it was broadcast Friday nights at 8:00 pm.

La Hora Pico was formed from a series of sketches and gags from different kinds of humor, such as black humor, urban, white, double meanings, and puns. The sketches were prepared according to the characteristics of each of the guests, without the intent of ridiculing, offending, or mocking. Only comical situations were proposed in which the public enjoyed its star in another facet of their career.

All these elements resulted in an entertaining and humorous program for family nights. La Hora Pico addressed issues of universal and topical interest.
