= Otro Rollo =

Mexican TV sketch comedy and variety show

Otro rollo con: Adal Ramones, popularly known as Otro Rollo (lit. "another roll" meaning "other stuff") is a Mexican sketch comedy and variety television show, broadcast live on Televisa from 1995 to 2007. It was hosted by Adal Ramones. It was watched by millions of households each week, and is considered one of the most influential entertainment programs in Mexican television. In the United States, it aired on Univision.

== History ==
The show debuted on May 13, 1995 and aired on Tuesday nights. It featured an opening monologue, comedy sketches, celebrity interviews, and live musical performances by various artists.

Its final episode on May 8, 2007, was a special edition that lasted for nearly five hours. The show was cancelled in spite of its popularity, because the cast was exhausted after more than a decade of constant rehearsals, recording, and promotion.

== Cast members ==
- Adal Ramones - Host
- Yordi Rosado - Co-host/Reporter
- Mauricio Castillo
- Fabiola Campomanes - (1995–1996)
- Roxana Castellanos - (1996–2006)
- Consuelo Duval - (1998–2000)
- Jorge Alejandro - (1999–2007)
- Eduardo España - (1999–2006)
- Gabriela Platas- (2000–2006)
- Manola Diez - (2003–2007)
- Yuliana Peniche - (2006–2007)
- Samia Bracamonte - (2006–2007)
- Eddy Vargas - (2006–2007)
- Luis Orozco - (2006–2007)
- Tamara Vargas - (2006–2007)
- Luigi & Benji Mercury - Show acrobats
- Abel Membrillo - Announcer

== Otro Rollo Band ==
- Musical directors - José Zavala (1999–2007), Chema Frías (1995–1999)
- Saxophone - Juan Antonio Ramos
- Trombone - Erick Rodríguez
- Trumpet - Gabriel Ramos and Carlos González
- Drums and Keyboard - Rudy Sánchez and Charly Saade
- Percussions - Raúl Oviedo
- Bass guitar - Jorge Zavala and Ricardo Rocha
