= Jorge Ortiz de Pinedo =

Mexican actor, comedian and director

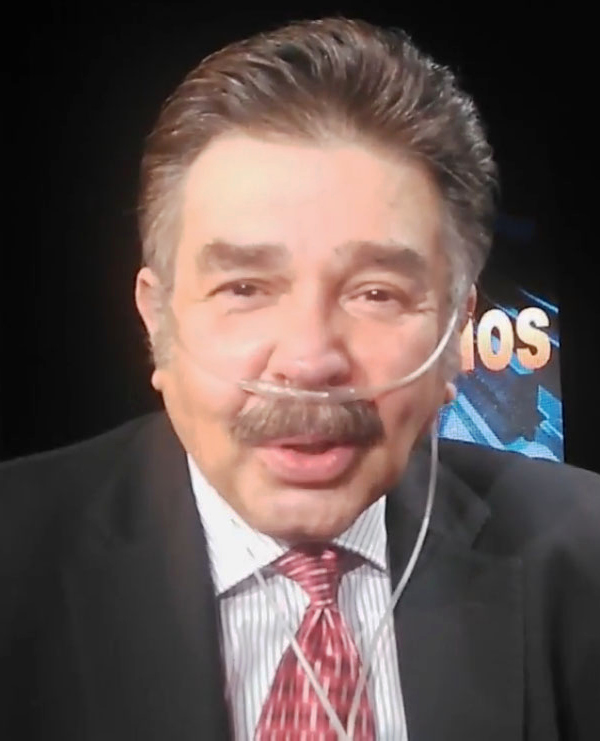
- Jorge Ortiz de Pinedo in 2018
- Born: Jorge Ortiz de Pinedo Pallás; March 26, 1948 (age 77); Mexico City, Mexico
- Occupations: Comedian, actor, film director, screenwriter, television producer
- Years active: 1966–2019

Jorge Ortiz de Pinedo Pallás (born March 26, 1948) is a Mexican comedian, actor, film director, screenwriter, television producer and host.

He is the son of actors, the Cuban Óscar Ortiz de Pinedo and Mexican Lupita Pallás, and has appeared on various TV shows such as: Dos mujeres en mi casa (1984), Dr. Cándido Pérez (1987), Cero en conducta (1998), Humor es... los comediantes (1999), La escuelita VIP (2004), La casa de la risa and Dos hogares (2011) as well as soap operas and films.

His mother Lupita and sister Laila were the two Mexican passengers executed in EgyptAir Flight 648 that was hijacked by the terrorist organization led by Abu Nidal on November 23, 1985.

His most recent television series is Fábrica de risas, which airs regularly on both Televisa in Mexico and Univision in the United States, the same as all of his previous series.

As a tribute to his time at Televisa and his various television series, the most successful of which have been Dr. Cándido Pérez, Cero en conducta, and its sequel, La escuelita VIP, Ortiz de Pinedo was featured in the 2007 book Televisa presenta, which takes a look back at 50 years of network television in Mexico. For his work in television and movies, Ortiz de Pinedo's handprints have been imbedded onto the Paseo de las Luminarias.

He has received numerous national and international awards. Ortiz de Pinedo has represented Mexico in the International Theatre Festival in Caracas and was a member of the National Theatre Company of Bellas Artes. He has performed in more than 80 theatre productions, 23 feature films, 25 soap operas, 11 comedy series and numerous other theatre events and productions. As a director, Ortiz de Pinedo has directed 40 works of theatre, two feature films, two soap operas, 12 comedy series and directed over 400 other productions for Televisa. He has also produced over 35 theatre productions.

In 2013, Ortiz de Pinedo was diagnosed with lung cancer. He retired in July 2019.
