= Una familia de diez season 2 =

Una familia de diez
- Season 2
- Starring: Jorge Ortiz de Pinedo; Eduardo Manzano; Zully Keith; Andrea Torre; Mariana Botas; Moisés Iván Mora; Jessica Segura; María Fernanda García; Camila Rivas; Tadeo Bonavides; Daniela Luján; Ricardo Margaleff
- No. of episodes: 13

Release
- Original network: Las Estrellas
- Original release: August 25 – October 5, 2019

Season chronology
- ← Previous; Season 1 Next → Season 3

The second season of the Mexican sitcom Una familia de diez premiered on August 25, 2019 and concluded on October 6, 2019 on Las Estrellas. Production of the season began on 8 January 2019.

After burning down the house they won in the season one finale, the López family is forced to return to the apartment where they lived before, now with two new members: Justito, son of Plutarco and Gaby, and Victoria, daughter of La Nena and Adolfo. The López family will live new troubles and problems, which will be solve with the support of the whole family.

== Cast ==
- Jorge Ortiz de Pinedo as Plácido López
- Eduardo Manzano as Don Arnoldo López
- Zully Keith as Renata González de López
- Andrea Torre as La Nena
- Mariana Botas as Martina López
- Moisés Iván Mora as Aldolfo
- Jessica Segura as Tecla
- María Fernanda García as Licha González
- Camila Rivas as Victoria
- Tadeo Bonavides as Justo "Justito" López
- Daniela Luján as Gaby del Valle de López
- Ricardo Margaleff as Plutarco López

== Episodes ==
No. overall	No. in season	Title	Original release date	Mexico viewers (millions)
25	1	"El regreso"	August 25, 2019	3.5
Because of a fatal event, the López will have to return to the building they left 10 years ago, only now there are more family members and the space is the same.
26	2	"Los muebles"	August 25, 2019	3.5
The López have virtually nothing for their apartment, but Plutarco and Gaby will solve this problem with a unique solution and hopefully bring a little order and peace to their home.
27	3	"A trabajar todos"	September 1, 2019	2.9
Plácido is tired of family not wanting to work, and help him with the expenses. This time he plans to stop this situation by ordering the family to look for a job and those who do not contribute, will not eat.
28	4	"La venta del edificio"	September 1, 2019	2.9
A new shopping center is coming to the neighborhood, the good news for Plácido is that now everyone will have a job, the bad news is that it will be built in the same place where their building is located. Now the family will have 24 hours to vacate the apartment.
29	5	"Ahí va el agua"	September 8, 2019	3.3
The family believes that their water service cut off due to lack of payment; so Aldolfo presents some unorthodox solutions.
30	6	"Tome su turno"	September 8, 2019	3.3
Knowing that they do not fit very well in the apartment, Plácido has prepared very dramatic solution for his family: Those who do not work will have to take turns living in the apartment.
31	7	"Embarazo no deseado"	September 15, 2019	2.0
Tecla is not feeling well and everyone suspects that she is pregnant and the possible culprit is a family member. Conflicts over possible infidelity will not wait.
32	8	"El socio"	September 22, 2019	2.0
Plácido receives a chance to become Don Justo's partner. Everyone already feels rich and starts spending/acting like millionaires, not knowing that, because of Plutarco, things may not go as expected.
33	9	"¿Quién se comió los tamales?"	September 22, 2019	2.0
A thunderstorm leaves the family without electricity, but when the power returns, Don Arnoldo's tamales disappear. Tecla is apparently to blame for everything, but Plutarco and Gaby will clarify this mystery and catch the culprits.
34	10	"Las vacaciones"	September 29, 2019	2.8
Don Justo needs to keep Plácido and Plácido out of his office, so he gives them the day off. And to make sure they do not come in, Don Justo offers them some money so they can take their family on vacation. The López leave the city and their adventures will lead them to a terrifying vacation.
35	11	"El abuelo pierde la memoria"	September 29, 2019	2.8
Don Arnoldo loses his memory due to a fall and does not remember who he is, and only knows that he has a hidden treasure.
36	12	"Cartas a la bruja"	October 6, 2019	3.0
Renata is a fan of a magazine where Madame Patú publishes her advice. A confused Plácido believes that Renata is cheating on him. And the young members of the family learn of the events that lead their births.
37	13	"Esperando a Justo"	October 6, 2019	3.0
The López prepare to receive a very special visit from Don Justo. Plácido and Renata will have to find a way to gather what is necessary to prepare a decent dinner and entertain their guest. Not knowing that Tecla will be leaving them.
