= Una familia de diez season 3 =

Una familia de diez
- Season 3
- Starring: Jorge Ortiz de Pinedo; Eduardo Manzano; Zully Keith; Carlos Ignacio; Andrea Torre; Mariana Botas; Moisés Iván Mora; Camila Rivas; Tadeo Bonavides; Daniela Luján; Ricardo Margaleff; Patricia Martínez
- No. of episodes: 13

Release
- Original network: Las Estrellas
- Original release: October 13 – November 24, 2019

Season chronology
- ← Previous; Season 2 Next → Season 4

The third season of the Mexican sitcom Una familia de diez premiered on October 13, 2019 and concluded on November 24, 2019 on Las Estrellas. Cast changes this season saw Jessica Segura and María Fernanda García depart the series. Series regulars added for the third season include Patricia Martínez as Jacinta, and previous guest star Carlos Ignacio as Carlos.

In this season, the life of the López family will take new and surprising turns. A family member will make a very special trip, never to return, and again they will find themselves in the dilemma of having to leave their department.

== Cast ==
- Jorge Ortiz de Pinedo as Plácido López
- Eduardo Manzano as Don Arnoldo López
- Zully Keith as Renata González de López
- Carlos Ignacio as Carlos
- Andrea Torre as La Nena
- Mariana Botas as Martina López
- Moisés Iván Mora as Aldolfo
- Camila Rivas as Victoria
- Tadeo Bonavides as Justo "Justito" López
- Daniela Luján as Gaby del Valle de López
- Ricardo Margaleff as Plutarco López
- Patricia Martínez as Jacinta

== Episodes ==
No. overall	No. in season	Title	Original release date	Mexico viewers (millions)
38	1	"Cenizas quedan"	October 13, 2019	3.3
The López prepare the funeral of a beloved family member. Everything will be accommodated, the López will have a change of life and will receive someone very special who threatens to stay forever.
39	2	"El ultimátum"	October 13, 2019	3.3
The López owe three months of rent and the owner of the building, La Chivis (Don Silvia), has threatened to evict them if they do not pay in 24 hours only to discover that salvation will come from the least expected place. On the other hand, Carlos, La Nena's father, has arrived again and wishes to stay.
40	3	"El huequito"	October 20, 2019	3.2
An argument between Martina and La Nena creates a hole in the wall that overlooks the apartment next door that nobody has claimed since the neighbor passed away, so some of López decide to live there illegally. Thanks to one of Plutarco's plutarcadas, Plácido must rest his foot for a month so he decides to send Aldolfo to help him get his job back.
41	4	"La llegada"	October 20, 2019	3.2
The López family will try to come up with new ways to cover the hole that connects their apartment to the one next door. And with Tecla gone, someone unexpected will cover her, Jacinta, her mother.
42	5	"Un fantasma de diez"	October 27, 2019	3.3
A neighbor of the building goes to the López to ask for help, because she has been hearing noises coming from the apartment above hers and next to the López, where the tenant died. Plácido and the others try to make the neighbor see that there is no one and even support the idea that it is a ghost, so they do a spiritualist session.
43	6	"Ácido fólico"	October 27, 2019	3.3
Justito and Victoria perform an experiment only for Plutarco accidentally drink it, causing him to become a super intelligent man. Gaby is worried because Plutarco is no longer the same, but Plácido decides to take advantage of his son's new super intelligence.
44	7	"Plácido inactivo"	November 3, 2019	3.0
Unable to find a job, Plácido has been left to lounge on the sofa and begins to resemble his father Don Arnoldo. Finding his comfort zone and with no intention of moving, he begins to require the members of the house to attend to him, driving them crazy. The situation becomes unbearable, so Renata calls an urgent meeting to force Plácido out of his inactivity and look for a job.
45	8	"Justo para todos"	November 3, 2019	3.0
Plácido reads in the newspaper that Don Justo has left prison and is now determined to recover his job, however when he goes to talk to his former boss, Don Justo makes him wait, treats him a servant and asks that the one needs to appear for a job is Aldolfo. Aldolfo refuses to be part of the capitalist system, but the family will convince him to accept the offer.
46	9	"Una noche de estreno"	November 10, 2019	2.4
Martina is left alone at the movie theatre where she works at and decides to give her family a movie premiere, while she charges the neighbors extra. Meanwhile, Plácido forgets his anniversary and quickly prepares a surprise dinner for Renata.
47	10	"El yerberito llegó"	November 10, 2019	2.4
Aldolfo loses the huachicolero bonus for bathing. La Nena seeks a solution that allows them to earn money and continue to cooperate with the family. Jacinta becomes Aldolfo's teacher of herbalism. Meanwhile, Carlos receives gifts from a secret admirer.
48	11	"Renata indiscreta"	November 17, 2019	2.9
Renata loves to spy on her neighbors from the bedroom window with Justito's telescope, thus finding out all the gossip of the building. Plácido get involved in a new accident thanks to Plutarco, forcing to stay in a wheelchair and decides to entertain himself by spying on the neighbors too, until he witnesses a crime.
49	12	"La enfermera"	November 17, 2019	2.9
La Nena feels a void since her mother passed away and it is not enough with just taking care of her husband and daughter, so she focuses by first taking care of her uncle Plácido, and then continues with the rest of her family. Gaby becomes a certified makeup artist. Together, Gaby and La Nena terrorize the family.
50	13	"La cereza en el pastel"	November 24, 2019	2.9
The rent increase once again for the López family making it almost impossible for them to pay it, so La Nena decides to sell homemade cakes and the business does well. The building administrator sees Carlos coming out of the hole that connects the López's apartment with the one next door, which they have been living in illegally, so he immediately calls the owner, Silvia Pinal, to confront the López family.
