= Una familia de diez season 6 =

Una familia de diez
- Season 6
- Starring: Jorge Ortiz de Pinedo; Eduardo Manzano; Zully Keith; Carlos Ignacio; Andrea Torre; Mariana Botas; Moisés Iván Mora; María Fernanda García; Camila Rivas; Tadeo Bonavides; Daniela Luján; Ricardo Margaleff
- No. of episodes: 15

Release
- Original network: Las Estrellas
- Original release: September 5 – October 24, 2021

Season chronology
- ← Previous; Season 5

The sixth season of the Mexican sitcom Una familia de diez premiered on Las Estrellas on 5 September 2021, and concluded on 24 October 2021.

In this season, Plutarco returns home after living a surreal adventure, while Martina threatens to give birth at any moment. Don Justo will come to live with the Lopezes, making their lives impossible. Romualdo will return to reclaim his son and will try to take Martina far away. La Nena, meanwhile, gets a scholarship for Victoria and Justito at the private school where she works and the consequences will be terrible. Plutarco and Gaby will celebrate their anniversary and Plácido will receive devastating news that could affect the whole family.

== Cast ==
- Jorge Ortiz de Pinedo as Plácido López
- Eduardo Manzano as Don Arnoldo López
- Zully Keith as Renata González de López
- Carlos Ignacio as Carlos
- Andrea Torre as La Nena
- Mariana Botas as Martina López
- Moisés Iván Mora as Aldolfo
- Camila Rivas as Victoria
- Tadeo Bonavides as Justo "Justito" López
- María Fernanda García as Licha González
- Daniela Luján as Gaby del Valle de López
- Ricardo Margaleff as Plutarco López

== Episodes ==
| No. overall | No. in season | Title | Original release date | Mexico viewers (millions) |
|---|---|---|---|---|
| 77 | 1 | "El hijo pródigo" | September 5, 2021 | 2.4 |
Three months have passed since the disappearance of the plane Plutarco was on, the grandfather's life has changed drastically.
| 78 | 2 | "Pagan justos por pecadores" | September 5, 2021 | 2.4 |
Justo comes to live at the Lopez's house and Martina suffers from pregnancy pains due to fighting with La Nena.
| 79 | 3 | "La Doctora Licha" | September 12, 2021 | 1.9 |
Aunt Licha gets a false credential to prescribe medicine at the pharmacy where Gertrudis works. Justo takes Plácido and Renata's bed.
| 80 | 4 | "Las aceitunas de Don Justo" | September 12, 2021 | 1.9 |
Justo bribes Victoria and Justito not to tell the rest of the family that he still has money. Enrique, an old love of Renata's returns to win her back.
| 81 | 5 | "La venganza de Chaolín" | September 19, 2021 | 1.8 |
Romualdo returns to claim his parental rights over the child he will have with Martina. Victoria and Justito enter the private school where La Nena teaches.
| 82 | 6 | "La sugar baby de Genaro" | September 19, 2021 | 1.8 |
The supposed heiress of Don Genaro arrives to recover the apartment where Licha and her family live. Gaby and Plutarco discover that Don Justo no longer has money problems.
| 83 | 7 | "Torpes trabajando" | September 26, 2021 | 1.7 |
Plácido and Plutarco return to work with Don Justo. Justito, Victoria and Martina compete to see who has the best mother.
| 84 | 8 | "La lela y el desorden" | September 26, 2021 | 1.7 |
Victoria's favorite stuffed animal is destroyed, Plutarco and Gaby become detectives to find the culprit. Renata gets Licha to do housework.
| 85 | 9 | "Una familia de trece" | October 3, 2021 | 2.0 |
Jessica and Don Justo fight over having Placido as a slave. Gaby feels sick and all the women in the house want to know if she is pregnant.
| 86 | 10 | "La quiniela ganadora" | October 3, 2021 | 2.0 |
Gaby and Plutarco are worried that Justito is jealous of his little brother. Plácido enters a soccer pool and discovers that he has the winning numbers.
| 87 | 11 | "Aldolfo en el hoyo" | October 10, 2021 | 2.6 |
The bathroom of the house has a hole in the ceiling and Plutarco and Aldolfo are in charge of repairing it. La Nena gets a streaming service to watch movies and series for free.
| 88 | 12 | "El Aniversario" | October 10, 2021 | 2.6 |
The family tries to help Gaby and Plutarco celebrate their anniversary. Plutarco turns a simple mission at the office into chaos.
| 89 | 13 | "Yoga y hamburguesas" | October 17, 2021 | 2.4 |
Aldolfo's mother comes looking for him to take over the family's million-dollar business. The Lopezes worry because they have no way to pay the rent.
| 90 | 14 | "Se va, se va, ¿se fue?" | October 17, 2021 | 2.4 |
Plutarco finds a former childhood classmate who bullied him. La Nena gives Aldolfo an ultimatum to get married once and for all.
| 91 | 15 | "A pujar se ha dicho" | October 24, 2021 | 1.9 |
Martina is about to give birth, but her arrival at Dr. Cándido Pérez's hospital becomes complicated. La Nena starts having fainting spells and vomiting.
