= Una familia de diez season 5 =

Una familia de diez
- Season 5
- Starring: Jorge Ortiz de Pinedo; Eduardo Manzano; Zully Keith; Carlos Ignacio; Andrea Torre; Mariana Botas; Moisés Iván Mora; María Fernanda García; Camila Rivas; Tadeo Bonavides; Daniela Luján; Ricardo Margaleff
- No. of episodes: 13

Release
- Original network: Las Estrellas
- Original release: October 4 – November 15, 2020

Season chronology
- ← Previous; Season 4 Next → Season 6

The fifth season of the Mexican sitcom Una familia de diez premiered on October 4, 2020, and concluded on November 15, 2020, on Las Estrellas. Production of the season began on September 18, 2020.

In this season Placido, as always, will find a way to help support the whole family, Martina will have to get used to her new life, and La Nena is about to get an excellent job, which she could lose when the truth of her original family becomes known.

== Cast ==
- Jorge Ortiz de Pinedo as Plácido López
- Eduardo Manzano as Don Arnoldo López
- Zully Keith as Renata González de López
- Carlos Ignacio as Carlos
- Andrea Torre as La Nena
- Mariana Botas as Martina López
- Moisés Iván Mora as Aldolfo
- María Fernanda García as Licha González
- Camila Rivas as Victoria
- Tadeo Bonavides as Justo "Justito" López
- Daniela Luján as Gaby del Valle de López
- Ricardo Margaleff as Plutarco López

== Episodes ==
No. overall	No. in season	Title	Original release date	Mexico viewers (millions)
64	1	"La Depre de Martina"	October 4, 2020	2.9
The family will have to help Martina come out of a severe depression after her beloved "Muffin love" left her planted at the altar. La Nena suffers, because Martina doesn't feel like arguing with her.
65	2	"Unos gemelos de diez"	October 11, 2020	2.7
Martina thinks she will be the mother of twins and that will make Placido very ill. Renata, Licha, Nena and Gaby will try to teach Martina all the maternal tasks that she will carry out for two.
66	3	"El museo López"	October 11, 2020	2.7
Gaby and Justito will find a new way for resources to flow for everyone. The family will participate in this original business that will turn the house upside down.
67	4	"ADN vas que más valgas"	October 18, 2020	3.1
When Justito and Victoria were born, Gaby and La Nena shared the delivery room with Emma, who has many similarities with Ajolotito and doubts about a possible change of babies.
68	5	"La plaza de La Nena"	October 18, 2020	3.1
La Nena could obtain a job in a private school that will guarantee a better salary and benefits, so the Lópezes will have to pretend what they are not before the zone inspector to help her.
69	6	"El aumento y la tarea"	October 25, 2020	2.4
Plácido will seek to request a raise with his boss. Victoria falls in love with a classmate who has nothing to do with her personality and Aldolfo will suffer the most for this.
70	7	"El desfile de modas"	October 25, 2020	2.4
Pierre will finally get out of jail and look for Carlos, in addition, he will ask the Lopezes for their support to win a fashion contest. In the end, Carlos will be disappointed in him.
71	8	"El Portafolio"	November 1, 2020	2.3
Plutarco takes a portfolio that is not his by mistake and is full of money. Everyone will be excited about this, but Renata is reluctant to touch a single peso.
72	9	"El regreso de Fu Man Chú"	November 1, 2020	2.3
Martina will receive an unexpected visit from Romy, but she will not be willing to accept him back. In addition, he confesses that they must go far, because he owes a lot of money.
73	10	"Licha Reptiliana"	November 8, 2020	3.4
Justito talks about Los Reptilianos, a new species that gradually transforms people into reptiles. The family will find several similarities between them and the ailing Aunt Licha.
74	11	"El Justo precio por trabajar"	November 8, 2020	3.4
Don Justo will appear in the López apartment with a proposal for Plácido: it is about his dream job, only the price is almost impossible for Plácido to pay.
75	12	"Un Plácido cumpleaños"	November 15, 2020	2.7
Placido gets excited when he thinks about how his family will celebrate his birthday, but he discovers that nothing was prepared for him. The family will react and realize that he deserves a great celebration.
76	13	"De lo perdido, lo que aparezca"	November 15, 2020	2.7
Renata will find a new way to entertain herself at the pharmacy, Plutarco will receive the owner of the airline he works for on a flight and bad news will scare the Lopezes.
