= Una familia de diez season 4 =

Una familia de diez
- Season 4
- Starring: Jorge Ortiz de Pinedo; Eduardo Manzano; Zully Keith; Carlos Ignacio; Andrea Torre; Mariana Botas; Moisés Iván Mora; María Fernanda García; Camila Rivas; Tadeo Bonavides; Daniela Luján; Ricardo Margaleff
- No. of episodes: 13

Release
- Original network: Las Estrellas
- Original release: August 23 – October 4, 2020

Season chronology
- ← Previous; Season 3 Next → Season 5

The fourth season of the Mexican sitcom Una familia de diez premiered on August 23, 2020 and concluded on October 4, 2020 on Las Estrellas. María Fernanda García returned to the series after being absent in the previous season. Patricia Martínez departed the series.

== Cast ==
- Jorge Ortiz de Pinedo as Plácido López
- Eduardo Manzano as Don Arnoldo López
- Zully Keith as Renata González de López
- Carlos Ignacio as Carlos
- Andrea Torre as La Nena
- Mariana Botas as Martina López
- Moisés Iván Mora as Aldolfo
- María Fernanda García as Licha González
- Camila Rivas as Victoria
- Tadeo Bonavides as Justo "Justito" López
- Daniela Luján as Gaby del Valle de López
- Ricardo Margaleff as Plutarco López

== Episodes ==
No. overall	No. in season	Title	Original release date	Mexico viewers (millions)
51	1	"Entre el bote y el agujero"	August 23, 2020	2.4
Plácido is jailed, Pierre tries to pay his bail, but the one who manages to get him released is Jacinta. The rest of the Lopezes try to cover the hole in the apartment before they are evicted.
52	2	"El regreso de la Licha viviente"	August 30, 2020	2.2
Aunt Licha returns from the afterlife, who was not dead after all and explains why she planned her death. Placido kicks her out of the apartment, but the family pleads for her.
53	3	"El Departa-miento"	August 30, 2020	2.2
Upon discovering that Licha inherited the apartment next door, the Lópezes will rearrange the arrangement of the rooms. Placido finds a new job with a millennial tyrant.
54	4	"Renata liberada"	August 30, 2020	2.2
Renata is fed up with no one cleaning and few cooperating with the housekeeping, so she will find work as a cosmetics salesperson.
55	5	"Volando bajo"	September 6, 2020	2.0
Plutarco finds work as a flight attendant and Gaby feels sad about his absences. Martina will try to go on a diet and Aldolfo will find a valuable chain that could cause problems.
56	6	"Ajolotito en riesgo"	September 6, 2020	2.0
Plutarco and Gaby have a jealous argument that puts them on the brink of divorce. Justito runs the risk of losing his family. Martina introduces her boyfriend, a minibus driver older than her.
57	7	"Nos cayó 'El Rorro'"	September 13, 2020	2.4
An unexpected visit will turn everyone upside down, because Licha and Renata's uncle arrives out of nowhere. The house goes crazy and the family discovers that someone has a secret past.
58	8	"Una Martina de diez… semanas"	September 13, 2020	2.4
The Lópezes will no longer have Martina's money, as she has just discovered that she is pregnant, but the good news is that her "sugar daddy" asked her to marry him and will soon be leaving the house.
59	9	"De vuelta al clóset"	September 20, 2020	2.9
Carlos suffers a blow to the head, when he wakes up he forgets that he is gay and feels an implacable desire to win back Licha. Don Justo gives Justito a new cell phone and his family fights to take it from him.
60	10	"Las tres Nenas"	September 20, 2020	2.9
La Nena has to substitute three teachers in different schools on the same day and she will need help from the whole family. Plácido and Aldolfo make a bet on their soccer teams.
61	11	"La Victoria del Sinsimito"	September 27, 2020	2.5
Placido is scared, because at work they mention the legend of a monster to him and Victoria is about to be dropped from school, unless she controls her character.
62	12	"La Despedida de soltera"	September 27, 2020	2.5
Martina's wedding is about to take place, so the family decides to give her a bachelorette party. The men are forced to roast the future husband, who arrives with his sexy daughter.
63	13	"Y fueron felices… ¿Para siempre?"	October 4, 2020	2.9
It is the day of the wedding and Martina is excited, she wants everything to be perfect. La Nena helps her with the preparations. The time of the wedding arrives and everything is ready, but the end will be unexpected.
