= List of Una familia de diez episodes =

Una familia de diez is a Mexican sitcom that premiered on Las Estrellas on March 22, 2007. The series is created by Jorge Ortiz de Pinedo and Pedro Ortiz de Pinedo. The series centers on the López household, a middle class Mexican family that live in an apartment which barely holds living space for them. The twelfth season premiered on September 28, 2025. The thirteenth and final season premiered on September 6, 2026.

As of November 15, 2026, 190 episodes of Una familia de diez have aired, currently in its thirteenth season.

== Series overview ==
Season	Episodes	Originally released	
Season	Episodes	First released	Last released
1	24	March 22, 2007	September 13, 2007
2	13	August 25, 2019	October 6, 2019
3	13	October 13, 2019	November 24, 2019
4	13	August 23, 2020	October 4, 2020
5	13	October 4, 2020	November 15, 2020
6	15	September 5, 2021	October 24, 2021
7	15	October 24, 2021	December 19, 2021
8	15	September 11, 2022	October 30, 2022
9	15	October 30, 2022	December 18, 2022
10	15	September 24, 2023	November 5, 2023
11	15	September 15, 2024	December 22, 2024
12	14	September 28, 2025	December 28, 2025
13	16	September 13, 2026	TBA

== Episodes ==
=== Season 1 (2007) ===
No. overall	No. in season	Title	Original release date
1	1	"La hija de mi Jefe"	March 22, 2007
Plácido López's house is no longer the same since almost all his family has decided to live there. Too many people for little space and to top it all off, his son Plutarco has married his boss's daughter and receives some shocking news.
2	2	"Ultimátum"	March 29, 2007
Plácido receives a phone call from Gaby's father who threatens him that if his daughter does not return home in 24 hours, he will be fired. Knowing that Plutarco will not allow his wife to leave, Plácido decides to resign and officially welcomes Gaby into the family.
3	3	"Limosna"	April 5, 2007
For not paying the rent, the López will soon be evicted, so everyone comes up with ways of making money. Don Arnoldo decides to beg and as he does well, Plácido is forced to follow in his father's footsteps. Martina sells a video of Plutarco and Gaby to a T.V. station.
4	4	"Condiciones"	April 12, 2007
Don Justo offers Plácido a chance to return to work under a condition that Plácido does not seem to like. Due to the lack of payment, the López's phone, gas and electricity are cut off. Gaby and Plutarco give news to Plácido.
5	5	"El baño"	April 19, 2007
Plácido seems to have no end to his family conflicts. On this occasion, Don Arnoldo clogs the bathroom toilet with tamale leaves, so Plácido instructs Plutarco to fix it.
6	6	"Televisión de paga"	April 26, 2007
Having trouble watching free-to-air television, Don Arnoldo decides to steal the signal from the administrator's cable service. But only to be discovered by a TV inspector, who forces Plácido (who is framed) to sign a contract.
7	7	"Abuelo astuto"	May 3, 2007
Don Arnoldo could die at any moment, so the López family pleases him with everything he wants. But Don Arnoldo finds out that his diagnosis was wrong and is not willing to give up all the attention he has been receiving.
8	8	"A pesar de todo"	May 10, 2007
A very upset Plácido kicks his father out of the house, but remembering the good things that happened between his father and him, he decides to forgive all his lies and allows Don Arnoldo to return home with open arms.
9	9	"No habrá boda"	May 17, 2007
Don Justo agrees that Gaby and Plutarco get married, he agrees to pay for the wedding only be deducted from Plácido's salary. But Gaby and Plutarco have an argument and the López family will have to help them reconcile and not look bad with Don Justo.
10	10	"La boda"	May 24, 2007
Don Justo gives Plutarco the wedding rings, but he loses them. Plácido reproaches his family for their behavior at Plutarco and Gaby's wedding. On their honeymoon, Plutarco has an accident.
11	11	"El papá de la nena"	May 31, 2007
The López prepare a surprise party for La Nena. Surprisingly, Carlos, La Nena's father reappears and tells her how his life has been. Guest stars: Carlos Ignacio as Carlos, José Luis Rodríguez as Piere
12	12	"Martina y Ricky"	June 7, 2007
Martina has her first boyfriend, but things get out of control when she makes up a life she doesn't have and in turn, her boyfriend also has a secret.
13	13	"La antena"	June 14, 2007
When trying to fix the TV antenna, lightning strikes the López, causing everyone to switch bodies. Renata asks a healer for help.
14	14	"Cambio de hábitos"	June 21, 2007
Renata comes up with the idea of detoxifying her family, so she informs them to make changes to their eating habits. Don Arnoldo overs hears La Nena talking to her boyfriend and takes the opportunity to blackmail her for food.
15	15	"Los cinco puntos"	June 28, 2007
Placido follows the recommendations of the five things a father should teach his offspring so that he can make a great son. And of course things don't go so well.
16	16	"El secreto"	July 5, 2007
Martina over hears that La Nena has a boyfriend and blackmails her with telling the family if she doesn't obey her orders. Tired of abuse, La Nena approaches Martina only to be discovered by the family.
17	17	"Adolfo"	July 12, 2007
Licha does not accept La Nena's relationship with Adolfo however, Renata proposes to have dinner so that they get to know him. Much to their surprise when they finally meet him. Guest star: Jaime Camil as himself
18	18	"Positivo"	August 2, 2007
La Nena finds out that she is pregnant and is afraid that her mother will react badly to this news. Adolfo tells Plácido that he will take responsibility for his child. Plutarco finds a way to inform Licha that La Nena is expecting a baby.
19	19	"Votación"	August 9, 2007
Adolfo refuses to help with the responsibility of helping the López home and takes La Nena to live in a commune. Missing La Nena, Plácido propose an agreement.
20	20	"La nueva dueña"	August 16, 2007
Worried that the new owner will evict any family that excess four members. Plácido decides to explain to the new owner why there are ten family members in his home. Guest star: Silvia Pinal as Doña Silvia
21	21	"Mala suerta"	August 23, 2007
The owner of the building informs the López that the rent will increase but Plácido gambles all of the rent money.
22	22	"Limitados"	August 30, 2007
Plácido implements an austerity plan in his house to save money, and with the money he saves, spends it in raffles. Suddenly he learns that he won a car, but he has no phone to make the call and claim it.
23	23	"Orígenes"	September 6, 2007
Licha interrogates Adolfo and finally finds out where La Nena's boyfriend comes from. Martina decides to be nice and generous, and gives Tecla a makeover.
24	24	"La casa del millón"	September 13, 2007
Esteban Arce contacts Plácido to compete for a huge and tax-free house. The López will have to answer five questions, however, as they take too long to answer the last question, they lose the prize, yet they receive a surprise.

=== Season 2 (2019) ===
No. overall	No. in season	Title	Original release date	Mexico viewers (millions)
25	1	"El regreso"	August 25, 2019	3.5
26	2	"Los muebles"	August 25, 2019	3.5
27	3	"A trabajar todos"	September 1, 2019	2.9
28	4	"La venta del edificio"	September 1, 2019	2.9
29	5	"Ahí va el agua"	September 8, 2019	3.3
30	6	"Tome su turno"	September 8, 2019	3.3
31	7	"Embarazo no deseado"	September 15, 2019	2.0
32	8	"El socio"	September 22, 2019	2.0
33	9	"¿Quién se comió los tamales?"	September 22, 2019	2.0
34	10	"Las vacaciones"	September 29, 2019	2.8
35	11	"El abuelo pierde la memoria"	September 29, 2019	2.8
36	12	"Cartas a la bruja"	October 6, 2019	3.0
37	13	"Esperando a Justo"	October 6, 2019	3.0

=== Season 3 (2019) ===
No. overall	No. in season	Title	Original release date	Mexico viewers (millions)
38	1	"Cenizas quedan"	October 13, 2019	3.3
39	2	"El ultimátum"	October 13, 2019	3.3
40	3	"El huequito"	October 20, 2019	3.2
41	4	"La llegada"	October 20, 2019	3.2
42	5	"Un fantasma de diez"	October 27, 2019	3.3
43	6	"Ácido fólico"	October 27, 2019	3.3
44	7	"Plácido inactivo"	November 3, 2019	3.0
45	8	"Justo para todos"	November 3, 2019	3.0
46	9	"Una noche de estreno"	November 10, 2019	2.4
47	10	"El yerberito llegó"	November 10, 2019	2.4
48	11	"Renata indiscreta"	November 17, 2019	2.9
49	12	"La enfermera"	November 17, 2019	2.9
50	13	"La cereza en el pastel"	November 24, 2019	2.9

=== Season 4 (2020) ===
No. overall	No. in season	Title	Original release date	Mexico viewers (millions)
51	1	"Entre el bote y el agujero"	August 23, 2020	2.4
52	2	"El regreso de la Licha viviente"	August 30, 2020	2.2
53	3	"El Departa-miento"	August 30, 2020	2.2
54	4	"Renata liberada"	August 30, 2020	2.2
55	5	"Volando bajo"	September 6, 2020	2.0
56	6	"Ajolotito en riesgo"	September 6, 2020	2.0
57	7	"Nos cayó 'El Rorro'"	September 13, 2020	2.4
58	8	"Una Martina de diez… semanas"	September 13, 2020	2.4
59	9	"De vuelta al clóset"	September 20, 2020	2.9
60	10	"Las tres Nenas"	September 20, 2020	2.9
61	11	"La Victoria del Sinsimito"	September 27, 2020	2.5
62	12	"La Despedida de soltera"	September 27, 2020	2.5
63	13	"Y fueron felices… ¿Para siempre?"	October 4, 2020	2.9

=== Season 5 (2020) ===
No. overall	No. in season	Title	Original release date	Mexico viewers (millions)
64	1	"La Depre de Martina"	October 4, 2020	2.9
65	2	"Unos gemelos de diez"	October 11, 2020	2.7
66	3	"El museo López"	October 11, 2020	2.7
67	4	"ADN vas que más valgas"	October 18, 2020	3.1
68	5	"La plaza de La Nena"	October 18, 2020	3.1
69	6	"El aumento y la tarea"	October 25, 2020	2.4
70	7	"El desfile de modas"	October 25, 2020	2.4
71	8	"El Portafolio"	November 1, 2020	2.3
72	9	"El regreso de Fu Man Chú"	November 1, 2020	2.3
73	10	"Licha Reptiliana"	November 8, 2020	3.4
74	11	"El Justo precio por trabajar"	November 8, 2020	3.4
75	12	"Un Plácido cumpleaños"	November 15, 2020	2.7
76	13	"De lo perdido, lo que aparezca"	November 15, 2020	2.7

=== Season 6 (2021) ===
No. overall	No. in season	Title	Original release date	Mexico viewers (millions)
77	1	"El hijo pródigo"	September 5, 2021	2.4
78	2	"Pagan justos por pecadores"	September 5, 2021	2.4
79	3	"La Doctora Licha"	September 12, 2021	1.9
80	4	"Las aceitunas de Don Justo"	September 12, 2021	1.9
81	5	"La venganza de Chaolín"	September 19, 2021	1.8
82	6	"La sugar baby de Genaro"	September 19, 2021	1.8
83	7	"Torpes trabajando"	September 26, 2021	1.7
84	8	"La lela y el desorden"	September 26, 2021	1.7
85	9	"Una familia de trece"	October 3, 2021	2.0
86	10	"La quiniela ganadora"	October 3, 2021	2.0
87	11	"Aldolfo en el hoyo"	October 10, 2021	2.6
88	12	"El Aniversario"	October 10, 2021	2.6
89	13	"Yoga y hamburguesas"	October 17, 2021	2.4
90	14	"Se va, se va, ¿se fue?"	October 17, 2021	2.4
91	15	"A pujar se ha dicho"	October 24, 2021	1.9

=== Season 7 (2021) ===
No. overall	No. in season	Title	Original release date	Mexico viewers (millions)
92	1	"¡Ah cómo chilla el niño!"	October 24, 2021	2.6
The Lopezes suffer from the crying of the new baby, while La Nena could discover Aldolfo's infidelity.
93	2	"Es todo Tulio"	October 31, 2021	2.1
Plutarco forgets Gaby's birthday. Plácido's lost and unrecognized brother shows up at the apartment.
94	3	"Gambito de babas"	October 31, 2021	2.1
Plutarco accidentally buys shares in the name of Don Justo. Gaby enters a chess tournament and could solve the family's financial problems.
95	4	"Le toca bailar con la más fea"	November 7, 2021	2.6
Don Justo forcibly retires Plácido and Plutarco must comply with his father-in-law's orders in order to exercise his rights.
96	5	"Dilema culinario"	November 7, 2021	2.6
Plutarco gets into trouble with the building manager and Tulio must sacrifice himself for the family. Renata participates in a contest where she could win a lot of money, but she is unable to attend.
97	6	"El futbolito"	November 14, 2021	2.6
Gaby and Plutarco are about to decide the name of their second baby. Plácido brings a foosball table to the house and organizes a tournament.
98	7	"Santos López de Santa Anna"	November 14, 2021	2.6
Justito discovers that they are descendants of the López de Santa Anna family. Gaby and Plutarco are trapped in the bathroom.
99	8	"El nuevo administragón"	November 21, 2021	2.3
Tulio is the new building manager. Martina and La Nena bet that Aldolfo is hiding something from his wife.
100	9	"Una familia de cien"	November 21, 2021	2.3
The Lopezes invite Silvia Pinal to dinner so that she will forgive their missing rent payments.
101	10	"Yani Lachifle"	November 28, 2021	2.6
The Lopezes have been hypnotized and wake up disguised as Peter Pan characters, and Placido has disappeared.
102	11	"El exorcismo de Martini Rouse"	November 28, 2021	2.6
Martina acts strange and the Lopezes think she is possessed. Victoria struggles to make the boys baseball team.
103	12	"No hay pero lucha"	December 5, 2021	2.5
Plutarco and Aldolfo go to a wrestling casting call. Justito falls in love with a classmate.
104	13	"Cuando los sonsos se van"	December 5, 2021	2.5
Gaby and Plutarco decide to look for their own apartment to move into.
105	14	"Una Navidad de diez"	December 19, 2021	2.1
Placido is worried about not having enough money for Christmas dinner and presents.
106	15	"Especial de Año Nuevo"	December 19, 2021	2.1
Placido tries to get grapes to make New Year's wishes, while the rest of the family performs all kinds of New Year's Eve rituals.

=== Season 8 (2022) ===
No. overall	No. in season	Title	Original release date	Mexico viewers (millions)
107	1	"Niño envuelto"	September 11, 2022	1.6
108	2	"Acuérdate de Acapulco"	September 11, 2022	1.6
109	3	"Madre sólo hay una"	September 18, 2022	1.8
110	4	"Éramos muchos"	September 18, 2022	1.8
111	5	"Depa confiscado"	September 25, 2022	1.6
112	6	"No hay mal que por más peor no venga"	September 25, 2022	1.6
113	7	"Aceite de coco"	October 2, 2022	1.7
114	8	"Me dieron charal por langosta"	October 2, 2022	1.7
115	9	"Pirámide de arena"	October 9, 2022	1.5
116	10	"Nace una estrella"	October 9, 2022	1.5
117	11	"Los xpedientes de Gertru"	October 16, 2022	2.2
118	12	"El cumple de Martina"	October 16, 2022	2.2
119	13	"Chef al vapor"	October 23, 2022	2.0
120	14	"La ropa nueva se revuelve en casa"	October 23, 2022	2.0
121	15	"Llegó el gusanitito"	October 30, 2022	1.8

=== Season 9 (2022) ===
No. overall	No. in season	Title	Original release date	Mexico viewers (millions)
122	1	"El bebé de Rosegaby"	October 30, 2022	2.5
123	2	"O se callan o se largan"	November 6, 2022	2.3
124	3	"No marches con la marcha"	November 6, 2022	2.3
125	4	"En el mar, la vida es más sabrosa"	November 13, 2022	2.2
126	5	"Misión imposible"	November 13, 2022	2.2
127	6	"Reloj no manches las horas"	November 20, 2022	2.0
128	7	"No te vaigas subcomandanta, no te vaigas"	November 20, 2022	2.0
129	8	"Se atormenta una vecina"	November 27, 2022	2.3
130	9	"Que pedí yo"	November 27, 2022	2.3
131	10	"Socio repartidor distinguido"	December 4, 2022	1.9
132	11	"Una nana explotada"	December 4, 2022	1.9
133	12	"Departamiento madre"	December 11, 2022	1.5
134	13	"Fue en un cabaret donde me encontré chafeando"	December 11, 2022	1.5
135	14	"La familia pequeña vive mejor"	December 18, 2022	1.6
136	15	"El nombre de La Nena"	December 18, 2022	1.6

=== Season 10 (2023) ===
No. overall	No. in season	Title	Original release date	Mexico viewers (millions)
137	1	"Cayó la Marabunta"	September 24, 2023	1.6
138	2	"Despedidas y bienvenidas"	September 24, 2023	1.6
139	3	"Lo que el lanchero se llevó"	October 1, 2023	1.5
140	4	"Sacaré al zorrillo, apeste lo que apeste"	October 1, 2023	1.5
141	5	"No es lo mismo un like que un me gusta"	October 1, 2023	1.5
142	6	"La suplente de la suplente"	October 8, 2023	1.9
143	7	"Estrellita ¿Dónde estás?"	October 8, 2023	1.9
144	8	"Martina encubierta"	October 8, 2023	1.9
145	9	"La casa de Pierre-De"	October 15, 2023	2.0
146	10	"El diez, de la diez"	October 15, 2023	2.0
147	11	"El avispa-miento"	October 22, 2023	2.1
148	12	"Salvemos a la nena"	October 22, 2023	2.1
149	13	"Hijo de la Quebrada"	October 29, 2023	1.8
150	14	"Aguas con el Coco"	October 29, 2023	1.8
151	15	"Me trajo la que me lleva"	November 5, 2023	1.6

=== Season 11 (2024) ===
No. overall	No. in season	Title	Original release date (Note: All fifteen episodes of the eleventh season were released on Vix on 9 August 2024, ahead of their weekly Las Estrellas premieres.)	Mexico viewers (millions)
152	1	"No Brayan a enamorarse"	September 15, 2024	1.31
153	2	"El desayuno de los campeones"	September 22, 2024	1.38
154	3	"Aldolfotui"	September 29, 2024	1.50
155	4	"Maripositas en la panza"	October 6, 2024	1.44
156	5	"No hagan olas"	October 13, 2024	1.27
157	6	"Lo que el aire... acondicionado se llevo"	October 20, 2024	1.41
158	7	"Fresco, pero no tanto"	October 27, 2024	1.58
159	8	"La maestra del año"	November 3, 2024	1.28
160	9	"Donde manda capitán, no gobierna un buen gerente"	November 10, 2024	1.62
161	10	"Un cuernito para la cena"	November 17, 2024	1.28
162	11	"Jueves pozolero recargado"	November 24, 2024	1.17
163	12	"Martina la regia"	December 1, 2024	1.28
164	13	"Los XV de Victoria... y otro"	December 8, 2024	N/A
165	14	"Cuando un extraño regresa"	December 15, 2024	N/A
166	15	"Una familia de... tres"	December 22, 2024	N/A

=== Season 12 (2025) ===
No. overall	No. in season	Title	Original release date (Note: All fourteen episodes of the twelfth season were released on Vix on 14 August 2025, ahead of their weekly Las Estrellas premieres.)	Mexico viewers (millions)
167	1	"De los tres que me tenía, me quedan 12"	September 28, 2025	2.62
168	2	"Pelea de territorios"	October 5, 2025	2.78
169	3	"La mata viejitos"	October 19, 2025	2.58
170	4	"Acomódese usted"	October 26, 2025	2.83
171	5	"Traje de baño, pero no traje pa'comer"	November 2, 2025	2.61
172	6	"Remodelación de telenovela"	November 9, 2025	2.88
173	7	"Los zombies costeños, pué"	November 16, 2025	1.86
174	8	"A buen vendedor, poca bisutería"	November 23, 2025	2.70
175	9	"El placer de la carne"	November 30, 2025	2.23
176	10	"Un bueno partido no siempre es de fútbol"	December 7, 2025	2.13
177	11	"El aniversario de la Nena y Aldolfo"	December 21, 2025	N/A
178	12	"Nena, eres mi fans"	December 21, 2025	N/A
179	13	"No es tan fácil ser un fósil"	December 28, 2025	N/A
180	14	"Te pasapps"	December 28, 2025	N/A

=== Season 13 (2026) ===
No. overall	No. in season	Title	Original release date (Note: All sixteen episodes of the thirteenth season were released on Vix on 7 August 2026, ahead of their weekly Las Estrellas premieres.)	Mexico viewers (millions)
181	1	"Un charal fuera del estanque"	September 13, 2026	1.89
182	2	"La precandida-chunda del presi-indigente"	September 20, 2026	2.28
183	3	"Hagan mi vestido, en lo que yo hago el oso"	September 27, 2026	2.08
184	4	"Como anillo al dedo"	October 4, 2026	2.58
185	5	"El quién es quién de la familia"	October 11, 2026	1.85
186	6	"Se busca pareja para Carlos"	October 18, 2026	2.45
187	7	"La femme fatal del Brayan"	October 25, 2026	2.30
188	8	"Enfermo que come y mea, el diablo se lo crea"	November 1, 2026	1.93
189	9	"Los consuegros llegaron ya"	November 8, 2026	2.17
190	10	"Los derechos del chueco de don Justo"	November 15, 2026	1.97
191	11	"Una obesa voluntad"	TBA	TBD
192	12	"El bigotón padre de la casi novia fresa"	TBA	TBD
193	13	"Un debate de 10"	TBA	TBD
194	14	"Aunque Martina se vista de seda"	TBA	TBD
195	15	"Sí... ¿acepto?"	TBA	TBD
196	16	"¡El final de acerca ya!"	TBA	TBD
