= ¿Tú crees? =

Mexican comedy series

- Genre: Sitcom
- Written by: Oscar Ortiz de Pinedo; Pedro Ortiz de Pinedo
- Directed by: Sergio Adrián Sánchez; Jorge Ortiz de Pinedo
- Starring: Daniela Luján; Ricardo Margaleff
- Country of origin: Mexico
- Original language: Spanish
- No. of seasons: 5
- No. of episodes: 69

Production
- Executive producers: Jorge Ortiz de Pinedo; Pedro Ortiz de Pinedo
- Producer: Ramón Salomón
- Production company: TelevisaUnivision

Original release
- Network: Las Estrellas
- Release: 31 July 2022 – present

Related
- Una familia de diez

¿Tú crees? is a Mexican comedy series produced by Jorge and Pedro Ortiz de Pinedo that premiered on Las Estrellas on 31 July 2022. It is a spin-off of Una familia de diez. The series follows Gaby (Daniela Luján) and Plutarco (Ricardo Margaleff) working in a supermarket as they attempt to become independent from their family.

The fifth season premiered on 13 September 2026.

== Cast ==
- Daniela Luján as Gaby del Valle de López
- Ricardo Margaleff as Plutarco López
- Pierre Angelo as Roldán
- Ingrid Martz as Irina
- Luis Manuel Ávila as Fabián
- Lenny Zundel as Zacarías
- Natalia Madera as La Chiquis
- Adriana Moles as Gertrudis (season 1)
- Lalo Palacios as Matías
- Melissa Hallivis as Lupita
- Tadeo Bonavides as Justo "Justito" López del Valle
- María Alicia Delgado as Dora
- Fernanda Rivas as Jinx (season 2–present)
- Andrea Montalvo as Kimberly (season 2–present)

== Production ==
The series was announced on 14 March 2022, with filming beginning a week earlier on 7 March 2022. On 26 June 2022, the first official trailer for the series was released. On 8 October 2022, the series was renewed for a second season. Filming of the second season began in May 2023. The season premiered on 5 November 2023. The third season premiered on 9 June 2024. Filming of the fourth season began on 30 April 2024. The season premiered on 14 September 2025.

== Episodes ==
Series	Episodes	Originally released	
Series	Episodes	First released	Last released
1	13	31 July 2022	4 September 2022
2	14	5 November 2023	17 December 2023
3	14	9 June 2024	8 September 2024
4	17	14 September 2025	11 January 2026
5	16	13 September 2026	TBA

=== Season 1 (2022) ===
No. overall	No. in season	Title	Original release date	Mexico viewers (millions)
1	1	"¿Tú crees?"	31 July 2022	1.7
Gaby and Plutarco become independent and go to live in an apartment with Justito and they find jobs at a supermarket called Almacenes Patito. Guest stars: Jorge Ortiz de Pinedo as Plácido López, Andrea Torre as La Nena, Frances Ondiviela
2	2	"Conserje sin dominio"	31 July 2022	1.7
Plutarco is appointed the janitor of the building where he lives. Meanwhile, Lupita is helped by everyone to sell her products inside the supermarket. Guest star: Juan Carlos Casasola
3	3	"La Deuda"	7 August 2022	1.4
Justito shoots a documentary at the supermarket. Meanwhile, Irina has a debt that could jeopardize the supermarket. Guest star: Silvia Lomelí
4	4	"Carnisalchichonero del amor"	7 August 2022	1.4
Plutarco and Gaby are left in charge of the supermarket signs. Meanwhile, Irina is obsessed with Fabián. Guest stars: Mariana Botas as Martina, Sugey Ábrego
5	5	"Jonathan Wilberto"	7 August 2022	1.4
The fashionable rapper will give a concert in front of the supermarket, but his resemblance to Plutarco causes problems.
6	6	"Justito y Chiquis"	14 August 2022	1.7
Chiquis is kicked out of her apartment and Justito is happy to put let her stay in their apartment.
7	7	"El Sobre Abasto"	14 August 2022	1.7
Plutarco is promoted and is now in charge of purchasing with suppliers. Plácido visits his son in the supermarket and is mistaken for an employee. Guest star: Jorge Ortiz de Pinedo as Plácido López
8	8	"El gran patrón"	21 August 2022	1.3
Roldán pretends to be the owner of the supermarket to impress a former colleague. Uncle Carlos visits Gaby and Plutarco. Guest stars: Carlos Ignacio as Carlos, Agustín Arana
9	9	"Robo hormiga"	21 August 2022	1.3
Irina and Roldán want to fire two employees, but their priorities change when they discover staff-related thieves.
10	10	"Los gusanitos de Gaby"	28 August 2022	0.93
Gaby adopts a couple of worms from the supermarket, just as a cleaning supervisor comes by for an inspection. Guest stars: Claudia Acosta, José Montini
11	11	"La carne es débil"	28 August 2022	0.93
La Nena and Aldolfo visit the supermarket, but they don't have enough money to buy what they want and a dangerous offer saves their plan. Guest stars: Andrea Torre as La Nena, Moisés Iván Mora as Aldolfo
12	12	"Con el apagón"	4 September 2022	1.3
Plutarco and Gaby have not paid the rent on their house and could be evicted. Roldán makes out with a woman in the supermarket thinking she is Irina. Guest star: Juan Carlos Casasola
13	13	"Súper desastre"	4 September 2022	1.3
Matías wants to bankrupt the supermarket, but Zacarías' mother will not allow him. The riots attract the attention of the authorities. Guest star: Susana Alexander

=== Season 2 (2023) ===
No. overall	No. in season	Title	Original release date	Mexico viewers (millions)
14	1	"¿Y cómo se inundó el lugar?"	5 November 2023	1.9
The employees of Almacenes Patito succeed in getting the store to reopen and are determined to start from scratch. Guest stars: Jorge Ortiz de Pinedo as Plácido López, José Montini
15	2	"Nana y Buche"	12 November 2023	1.9
Guest stars: Juan Carlos Casasola, Pedro Romo, Fernando Canek
16	3	"Las carnitas de Roldán"	12 November 2023	1.9
17	4	"Te demuestro que demuestro mejor lo que demuestro"	19 November 2023	1.6
Guest star: Mar Contreras
18	5	"Irina no está, Irina se fue"	19 November 2023	1.6
Guest stars: Abril Michel as Sara, Fernando Canek
19	6	"El debate por la gerencia"	26 November 2023	1.5
Guest stars: Issabel Camil, Daniel Gama
20	7	"A cómo dan su mazapán?"	26 November 2023	1.5
Guest star: Emmanuel Palomares
21	8	"Peleas en el Coliseo"	3 December 2023	1.6
Guest star: Diego de Erice
22	9	"La vocera del salón"	3 December 2023	1.6
Guest stars: Fernanda Ostos, Flor Martino
23	10	"En la madre... siempre hay que confiar"	10 December 2023	1.5
Guest star: Gaby Platas
24	11	"Guardería Rayito"	10 December 2023	1.5
Guest star: Susana Alexander
25	12	"Se quieren robar a Fabián"	17 December 2023	1.1
Guest stars: Roberto Blandón, Juan Carlos Casasolas, Marcela Morett
26	13	"¡Ahí va el agua!"	17 December 2023	1.1
Guest star: Roxana Castellanos
27	14	"Super Gaby"	17 December 2023	1.1
Guest star: Gaby Platas

=== Season 3 (2024) ===
No. overall	No. in season	Title	Original release date	Mexico viewers (millions)
28	1	"El sol sale para todos"	9 June 2024	1.46
Guest stars: Gaby Platas, Juan Carlos Casasola, Mercedes Vaughan
29	2	"Regrésenme a mi Irina"	16 June 2024	0.96
Guest star: Juan Carlos Casasola
30	3	"Pa' la calor y el desamor... Un ventilador"	23 June 2024	1.02
31	4	"Mamita querida"	30 June 2024	1.10
Guest star: Sammy Schoulund
32	5	"El sonido-nido-nido"	7 July 2024	1.07
33	6	"Papá soltero"	14 July 2024	1.28
34	7	"La capacitancia"	21 July 2024	1.43
35	8	"El cliente siempre tiene la razón"	28 July 2024	1.13
36	9	"Un lío embarazoso"	4 August 2024	0.86
37	10	"Regreso a clases"	11 August 2024	1.00
38	11	"El hombre con sombrero y el hombre sin esposa"	18 August 2024	1.00
39	12	"Doña Luz, preste una luz"	25 August 2024	1.30
40	13	"La venta del departamento"	1 September 2024	1.20
41	14	"El sol no es como lo pintan"	8 September 2024	1.36

=== Season 4 (2025–26) ===
No. overall	No. in season	Title	Original release date	Mexico viewers (millions)
42	1	"Remodelando ando"	14 September 2025	2.00
43	2	"Hombres contra mujeres"	21 September 2025	1.83
44	3	"Ensoñaciones con pañal"	28 September 2025	1.94
45	4	"Ser buen padre es un des... padre"	5 October 2025	2.06
46	5	"El castillo del juguete"	19 October 2025	1.99
47	6	"¡Ay, papachito!"	26 October 2025	2.32
48	7	"¿Es nuestro aniversario?"	2 November 2025	2.13
49	8	"La hermana de Peloncillo"	9 November 2025	2.27
50	9	"La pijamada"	16 November 2025	1.47
51	10	"Llegó la chancla"	23 November 2025	2.51
52	11	"Laureano el Regio"	30 November 2025	1.94
53	12	"Entre bodas te veas"	7 December 2025	2.03
54	13	"Qué feos modos... y suéteres"	14 December 2025	2.57
55	14	"Encerradas sin posada"	21 December 2025	N/A
56	15	"Aguas con el agua"	28 December 2025	N/A
57	16	"Oooos pido posada"	4 January 2026	2.20
58	17	"Un bodorrio de reyes"	4 January 2026	2.19

=== Season 5 (2026) ===
No. overall	No. in season	Title	Original release date (Note: All sixteen episodes of the fifth season were released on Vix on 7 August 2026, ahead of their weekly Las Estrellas premieres.)	Mexico viewers (millions)
59	1	"Cuando salió el sol en Del Sol"	13 September 2026	1.55
60	2	"Entre broma y broma"	13 September 2026	1.55
61	3	"La gerenta interina"	20 September 2026	1.83
62	4	"Un casting muy dulce"	27 September 2026	1.85
63	5	"O-toño o Emmanuel, el musical"	4 October 2026	2.13
64	6	"El cuento que sale mal"	11 October 2026	1.41
65	7	"No hay mal que por la Britny no venga"	18 October 2026	1.76
66	8	"Ponte en mis zapatos"	25 October 2026	1.76
67	9	"De quién Zacarías los genes"	1 November 2026	1.66
68	10	"El Humberto más codiciado"	8 November 2026	1.72
69	11	"Donde cenan 2, cenan 6"	15 November 2026	1.67
70	12	"En la madre de Fabián"	TBA	TBD
71	13	"En el amor y la guerra"	TBA	TBD
72	14	"Encerrados en la tienda"	TBA	TBD
73	15	"Oh que la canción"	TBA	TBD
74	16	"Entre tantos peregrinos"	TBA	TBD

== Ratings ==
Viewership and ratings per season of ¿Tú crees?
Season	Episodes	First aired		Last aired		Avg. viewers (millions)
Season	Episodes	Date	Viewers (millions)	Date	Viewers (millions)	Avg. viewers (millions)
1	13	31 July 2022	1.7	4 September 2022	1.3	1.39
2	14	5 November 2023	1.9	17 December 2023	1.1	1.59
3	14	9 June 2024	1.46	8 September 2024	1.36	1.16
4	17	14 September 2025	2.00	4 January 2026	2.19	2.10
5	11	13 September 2026	1.55	TBA	TBD	1.73
