= El rey de los taxistas =

1989 film by Benito Alazraki

- Directed by: Benito Alazraki
- Screenplay by: Tomás Fuentes; Luis de Alba; Armando Ramírez; Benito Alazraki
- Story by: Tomás Fuentes
- Starring: Luis de Alba; Maribel Guardia; Pedro Weber
- Cinematography: Daniel López
- Edited by: Carlos Savage
- Music by: Nacho Méndez
- Production company: Televicine S.A. de C.V.
- Release date: 2 February 1989 (Mexico)
- Country: Mexico
- Language: Spanish

El rey de los taxistas (English: "The King of the Taxi Drivers") is a 1989 Mexican comedy film directed by Benito Alazraki and starring Luis de Alba and Maribel Guardia.

== Plot ==
Taxi driver Juan Camaney (de Alba) is married to the beautiful Lorena (Guardia), but he carries on multiple affairs. Lorena, upset, agrees to work as a model for a photographer. Juan is accused for crimes that are actually committed by two men who take his taxi when he is not working. His wife and two friends clear his name, but when she sees that he is still a womanizer, Lorena marries the photographer and travels to the United States. Juan only asks her to send him two VCRs and a television.

== Cast ==
- Luis de Alba as Juan Camaney
- Maribel Guardia as Lorena
- Pedro Weber as Deputy Pérez García (as Pedro Weber "Chatanuga")
- Ana Berumen as Dionisia
- Roberto Miranda (as Puck Miranda)
- Carlos Yustis
- Armando Ramírez
- Gonzalo Sánchez
- Charly Valentino as Jaime
- César Bono as Devil
- Jorge Zamora as Zamorita (como Zamorita)
- Gloria Alicia Inclán
- Olimpia Alazraki
- Beatriz Arroyo
- Laura Tovar
- Ana Luz Aldana
- Eduardo Lugo
- Adrian Gómez
- Moris Grey
- Roberto Ruy
- Adriana Rojas
- Miguel Manzano
- Aida Pierce
- Silvia Suárez

== Production and release ==
The film was shot in 1987. It was released on 2 February 1989 on the Insurgentes 70, Tlatelolco, Las Alamedas 1, Premier, Emiliano Zapata, Lago 2, Marina, Tlalnepantla, Nacional, Vicente Guerrero, Tlalpan, Santos Degollado and Brasil cinemas, for four weeks.
