= Tomy Zombie =

Mexican television series

- Genre: Sitcom
- Created by: Pedro Ortiz de Pinedo; Oscar Ortiz de Pinedo
- Directed by: Leticia Amezcua
- Starring: Ari Placera; Paula Cacho; Emiliano Islas; Miranda Goncalves; Rodrigo Flores; Julieta Luna; Zoe Torres; Dafne Josette
- Theme music composer: Alan Muñoz; Giorgio Torelli
- Opening theme: "Quien soy"
- Composers: Juan Carlos Pastrana; Christian Almendares; Luis Enrique Mora
- Country of origin: Mexico
- Original language: Spanish
- No. of seasons: 1
- No. of episodes: 40

Production
- Executive producer: Pedro Ortiz de Pinedo
- Producers: Zuly González; Manolo Fernández
- Editor: Felipe Ortiz
- Production company: TelevisaUnivision

Original release
- Network: Canal 5
- Release: 29 September – 24 October 2025

Tomy Zombie is a Mexican sitcom television series created by Oscar and Pedro Ortiz de Pinedo. The series stars Ari Placera as Tomy, who, on his 13th birthday, turns into a zombie. It premiered on Canal 5 on 29 September 2025. In February 2026, the series was canceled after one season.

== Plot ==
Tomy is the most popular kid at school and captain of the football team. His life changes on his 13th birthday when he wakes up transformed into a zombie. On the other hand, Boby, the school's bullied kid, dreams of becoming a zombie like his whole family, but on his 13th birthday, he is disappointed when this does not happen. With the help of his classmates, Tomy discovers the secret of why he became a zombie and Boby did not transform: they were switched at birth by a witch. This situation causes Tomy and Boby's families to have to coexist as one.

== Cast ==
=== Main ===
- Ari Placera as Tomy
- Paula Cacho as Heidi
- Emiliano Islas as Boby
- Miranda Goncalves as Caro
- Rodrigo Flores as Frankie
- Julieta Luna as Zaira
- Zoe Torres as Blanca
- Dafne Josette as Lorena

=== Recurring and guest stars ===
- Andrea Torre as Esmeralda
- Sergio Ochoa as Zenón
- Yekaterina Kiev as Ms. Garrazimovich
- Ferny Graciano as Chayo
- José Dammert as Neto
- Herson Andrade as Caralampio
- Lot Soffi as Nina
- Ricardo de Pascual as Zeus
- Jesús Nunes as Sansón
- Max Uribe as Ricardo
- Fernando Canek as Dr. Van Helsing
- Alejandro Herrera as Dr. Jekyll
- Lara Campos as Sonia Momia

== Episodes ==
No.	Title	Written by	Original release date	Mexico viewers (millions)
1	"Feliz Zombiaños"	Jorge Karlóz	29 September 2025 (Note: This episode was first released on Vix on 16 September 2025, ahead of its premiere on Canal 5.)	0.70
Tomy is the most popular kid in middle school and is about to turn 13. Tomy and his family are normal, but Boby's family are zombies, and when they turn 13, they become zombies, which doesn't happen to Boby, but it does to Tomy.
2	"Ya te la zombies"	Iñaki Otero	29 September 2025	0.70
After following each of the clues, everyone at school suspects that Tomy is a zombie and they confirm it. Heidi warns the students that her mom is a monster hunter and they have to be careful around her. Heidi wants to help Tomy because she has a crush on him. In the middle of a conversation, Tomy shows his scar, without realizing that it is the mark belonging to Boby's family.
3	"Cómo cambiar a un bebé"	Jorge Karlóz	30 September 2025	0.56
Tomy's grandfather reveals something that happened at Boby's birth, and everything points to him having been switched by a witch. Heidi hides Tomy in one of the school classrooms for fear that her mother will discover him.
4	"El capitán"	Maricarmen Morfín	30 September 2025	0.56
Boby surprises his family by changing his look. Garrazimovich buys a monster detector to capture them in order to enter the lodge. Meanwhile, Tomy and Ricardo compete to be captain of the football team. Tomy discovers that as a zombie, he has acquired super strength.
5	"Tomy zombi, Boby no zombi"	Carolina Ayala	1 October 2025	0.64
When Tomy's parents, Chayo and Neto, find out that he is a zombie and that he is not their son, they want answers, blaming Boby's parents for everything. Caro and Heidi try to calm Chayo and Neto down while they buy some time. Tomy surprises everyone with his decision to live with his biological parents, but instead of separating, they are now an extended family.
6	"El Bibidibabidibú"	Fernando Canek	1 October 2025	0.64
Tomy is desperate to return to his human side, so he, Boby, Caro, Zaira, and Frankie decide to borrow Esmeralda's spell book to turn him back into a human, but they accidentally revive two figures from the past.
7	"Mi casa es tu casa y tu casa es mi casa... o algo así"	César Ferrón	2 October 2025	0.61
Both Tomy and Boby decide to spend a few days at their biological families' homes. Now they must try to adapt to new customs and see if they can really do it. Meanwhile, Heidi is determined to declare her love for Tomy.
8	"Hay monstritos y ajo"	Iñaki Otero	2 October 2025	0.61
Garrazimovich discovers that there are monsters in the school and decides to hunt at least one of them, but Heidi makes sure she doesn't succeed. Meanwhile, Zaira tries to get back together with Ricardo, but she realizes that he prefers to be with Caro.
9	"No eres tú, soy yo... bueno, sí eres tú"	Jorge Karlóz	3 October 2025	0.68
Lorena is being toxic toward Tomy, not only bothering him, but also his family and friends, so he decides to break up with her. Caro and Zaira organize a party at Hamburguezombi to become more popular at school.
10	"Queremos Halloween"	Maricarmen Morfín	3 October 2025	0.68
The traditional Halloween dance is about to take place and Blanca reveals that she is a ghost. Tomy discovers that there is a way for Blanca to stop being a ghost, but it is so dangerous that they cannot obtain it.
11	"La noche de la Blanca Viviente"	Carolina Ayala	6 October 2025 (Note: This episode was first released on Vix on 3 October 2025, ahead of its premiere on Canal 5)	0.95
When Boby asks Zaira to bring Blanca back to life, Zaira helps him with Esmeralda's book of spells. Blanca has twelve hours to return to school before she is lost in the abyss forever.
12	"Intercambio de amores"	Fernando Canek	6 October 2025	0.95
Heidi decides to confess her feelings to Tomy, so she plans a romantic date, but at the same time Tomy gets into a conflict about whether to go on his date with Heidi or attend football practice. Tomy resorts to a spell to be in two places at once, and Frankie helps him with this task. After a series of misunderstandings with their classmates, Tomy and Frankie put an end to their spell.
13	"Tú y yo ¿qué somos?"	César Ferrón	7 October 2025	0.78
When Tomy excitedly gives Heidi some flowers, she rejects him in front of Garrazimovich, which upsets Tomy. Meanwhile, Lorena sees this as an opportunity to get back together with him. Tomy organized a family dinner to get Garrazimovich to accept his friendship with Heidi, but it doesn't turn out as he expected.
14	"Talismán para cuál"	Iñaki Otero	7 October 2025	0.78
When Zeus is momentarily paralyzed, he confesses that Morgana, the witch who turned him into a zombie for having stood her up, has returned to collect an old debt. Morgana demands that they hand over the mythical talisman of Cortés, a powerful totem.
15	"Lobo, lobo, ¿estás ahí?"	Jorge Karlóz	8 October 2025	0.79
Heidi turns thirteen and is happy because Garrazomovich has allowed her to have a party at school. Everyone is excited, but Zeus senses that something is wrong, and Esmeralda's wand confirms a werewolf alert. During the night of the full moon, Heidi began to feel ill, only to discover that she is a werewolf.
16	"Una loba en el armario"	Maricarmen Morfín	8 October 2025	0.79
The evil witch Morgana, who in the past cursed Zeus' family out of revenge, returns and now curses Heidi, transforming her into a werewolf. Garrazimovich's monster-detecting cameras are a danger to Heidi, so her friends help her avoid being caught.
17	"De vuelta a la humanidad"	Carolina Ayala	9 October 2025	0.86
Esmeralda sees in her crystal ball that Tomy and Zaira could be captured by Garrazimovich, so she brings the families together to see how they can avoid this catastrophic future. Thanks to a potion made by Esmeralda, Tomy and Heidi manage to throw Garrazimovich off for a few hours.
18	"Las Crónicas de Blanca: El amor, la bruja y el brazalete"	Fernando Canek	9 October 2025	0.86
The gang is excited about a movie premiere, but they know Blanca can't leave school. Tomy thinks of using a spell to get her out, but it doesn't work. Thanks to Esmeralda's bracelet, Blanca manages to leave school without getting lost in eternal limbo.
19	"¡Lore, no seas payasa!"	Jorge Karlóz	10 October 2025	1.03
It's Lorena's 13th birthday, so Tomy and his friends fear that the curse will manifest itself in her too. Morgana manages to make Lorena suffer from her curse, transforming her into a clown with fits of laughter. Lorena has a weak spot that causes her to transform into a clown, so Tomy and his friends will attack that weakness to save her from Garrazimovich.
20	"¡Está viva, está viva!"	César Ferrón	10 October 2025	1.03
As Frankie prepares to celebrate the 94th anniversary of the premiere of his "grandfather" Frankenstein's film, he decides to take on a challenge to prove that he has the family gifts. Frankie's challenge to prove that he is related to Frankenstein ultimately pays off, bringing a lifeless cat back to life.
21	"Los freaks vs los populares"	Carolina Ayala	13 October 2025	0.63
Garrazimovich has announced the start of the famous Zepellin Middle School rally. The problem is that the teams are made up of six people, so Caro has to be on the popular team with Lorena, Nina, Ricardo, and the twins. As part of the hazing ritual at Zepellin Middle School, Garrazimovich and the other teachers play a prank on their students.
22	"El plan canguengue"	Maricarmen Morfín	13 October 2025	0.63
Lorena and Garrazimovich once again plan to separate Tomy and Heidi, but everything gets complicated and Lorena is discovered. Tommy and Heidi don't break up, as they plan with all their friends how to embarrass Lorena, who fails miserably.
23	"¿Quién le teme al lobo feroz?"	Fernando Canek	14 October 2025	N/A
The most important party at Zepellin Middle School, La Verbena, is going to jeopardize Heidi's secret, as it takes place on the night of the full moon, when she transforms into a werewolf. After learning that Heidi has revealed her identity as a werewolf to everyone, Esmeralda comes to the rescue to set things right.
24	"¡La plantaste y me da miedo!"	Rebeca Zuloaga	14 October 2025	N/A
Caro decides to grow a bean to pass science class, but a mistake in the amount of Esmeralda's magic powder causes the plant to become self-conscious. Meanwhile, Tomy ends up forgetting a concert he promised to go to with Heidi because of a soccer event, and now he must make up for his mistake.
25	"Mi casa no es tú casa"	Iñaki Otero	15 October 2025	N/A
Trying to adapt to each house has led Bobby and Tommy to devise different plans that benefit both of them. After failing to agree on changing rooms and houses, Bobby and Tommy are punished by having to sleep in Hamburguezombie together.
26	"Celos estuve di y di"	César Ferrón	15 October 2025	N/A
Ricardo falls into Lorena's trap by becoming her boyfriend to make their respective crushes jealous.
27	"El evento canónico"	Carolina Ayala	16 October 2025	0.66
When Caro decides to go back in time to prevent Zaira's "canonical event" of vomiting on Ricardo, the rest decide to help her go back to that moment in the past with Frankie.
28	"Miss Garramorsovich"	Maricarmen Morfín	16 October 2025	0.66
The students are tired of Garrazimovich's harsh behavior, so they use Esmeralda's magic to turn her into a very loving and tender person, but soon realize that the old version of Garrazimovich is the best.
29	"Un niño sangrón"	Fernando Canek	17 October 2025	0.76
The new student at Zepellin School is wreaking havoc in his quest to obtain the time-no-time watch. After falling in love with the new boy, Caro ends up being bitten by him and thus transforming into a vampire.
30	"Lobita vs wampirita"	Rebeca Zuloaga	17 October 2025	0.76
Van Helsing arrives at the school in search of monsters, just as Heidi transforms into a werewolf and Caro discovers she is a vampire. After trying to escape from Van Helsing, Garrazimovich ends up discovering the secret of all the monsters at Zepelin School.
31	"Sin trance no hay avance"	Iñaki Otero	20 October 2025	0.81
Caro is now misusing the powers she acquired when she became a vampire, enslaving everyone in her path and forcing them to perform ridiculous dances for her social media. Tired of Caro's bad temper as a vampire, Tomy and the others ask Esmeralda for help in creating a talisman to counteract her.
32	"Me lleva la calaca"	César Ferrón	20 October 2025	0.81
Bobby is unable to kiss Blanca as she is a ghost, so he looks for a spell. The spell causes La Catrina to cross the threshold of the underworld to demand that they set up an altar or they will never see Blanca again. Blanca is reunited with her sister in the underworld. Bobby and Blanca manage to kiss and start dating.
33	"Un nuevo zombie en la familia"	Carolina Ayala	21 October 2025	0.71
The Zombie family is excited to welcome Zalea, Zeus's youngest granddaughter, who has become a Zombie. Esmeralda realizes that Zalea is trying to steal her witch kit as revenge against her mother.
34	"Sonia momia"	Maricarmen Morfín	21 October 2025	0.71
The new girl at Zeppelin School raises Blanca's suspicions, as she believes she knows her from many years ago. Sonia Momia remembers her past with Blanca and reveals her true identity, but not before facing a dangerous mummy.
35	"Bobiando de amorts"	Fernando Canek	22 October 2025	0.83
When Boby finally plucks up the courage to go on a date with Blanca, he is punished by Esmeralda after being falsely accused by Ricardo of putting itching powder on Professor Sansón's chair, which means he can't go. Boby manages to evade Esmeralda's punishment to get to his date with Blanca, but Garrazimovich arrives at the worst possible moment to ruin everything.
36	"Chistichin el muñeco embrujiscado"	Rebeca Zuloaga	22 October 2025	0.83
Looking for something to help Frankie be funnier, the group finds a ventriloquist dummy that seems normal until it starts talking on its own. Having unleashed Chistichin's power, he will now seek a way for Frankie to return all his power by controlling people.
37	"La logia que nunca elogia"	Iñaki Otero	23 October 2025	0.76
Garrazimovich is informed that she will be expelled from the monster hunters' lodge unless she delivers a monster within the next 24 hours. Trying to find a monster to give to Garrazimovich, the kids plan to hand over Brayan, Caro's monster plant.
38	"¡Ahí hay humor, familia!"	César Ferrón	23 October 2025	0.76
When Frankie plays a prank on Caralampio, the school calls his dad, who turns out to be very similar to him, but even more annoying. The problems grow when Viktor manages to charm Garrazimovich and she falls madly in love with him. Heidi is not at all happy with the relationship between Frankie's father and Garrazimovich, so she devises a plan to separate them.
39	"El cazador de cazadores de monstruos"	Carolina Ayala	24 October 2025	N/A
Someone has discovered that Tomy and Heidi are monsters and has tipped off Garrazimovich so she can hunt them down. The monster hunting lodge arrives at the school to catch all the monsters there. Garrazimovich must choose which side she is on.
40	"VTP a Transilvania"	Maricarmen Morfín	24 October 2025	N/A
The monster hunters return in search of the monsters that escaped them. Parents and children prepare for battle, even Garrazimovich, so that they won't be taken away. The final battle against the monster hunters was not a complete victory, as the lodge manages to capture Tomy.

== Production ==
Filming of the series began on 25 June 2025. The series received an order of 40 episodes. On 12 February 2026, series co-creator Oscar Ortiz de Pinedo announced that the series was canceled after one season.

== Release ==
The series premiered on 29 September 2025, on Canal 5. The first ten episodes became available to stream on Vix prior to their televised premieres.

== Ratings ==
Viewership and ratings per season of Tomy Zombie
Season	Timeslot (CT)	Episodes	First aired		Last aired		Avg. viewers (millions)
Season	Timeslot (CT)	Episodes	Date	Viewers (millions)	Date	Viewers (millions)	Avg. viewers (millions)
1	Mon–Fri 7:00 p.m. (1–20); Mon–Fri 5:30 p.m. (21–40)	38	29 September 2025	0.70	TBA	TBD	0.75
