= Pedro Ortiz de Pinedo =

Mexican producer and writer

- Born: 1 December 1977 (age 48); Mexico City, Mexico
- Occupations: Television writer; producer
- Years active: 2005–present
- Spouse: Andrea Torre (m. 2010)
- Children: 3

Pedro Ortiz de Pinedo (born 1 December 1977) is a Mexican television producer and writer. He has produced and created a number of television series including Una familia de diez (2007–present), La CQ (2012–2014), and Renta congelada (2017–present). He is son of comedian and television producer Jorge Ortiz de Pinedo.

== Personal life ==
Ortiz de Pinedo has been married to actress Andrea Torre since May 2010. They have three children together.

== Filmography ==
=== Television ===
Year	Title	Notes	Ref.
2005	Par de ases	Associate producer	
2006	¡Qué madre tan padre!	Associate producer	
2007	Fabrica de risas	Associate producer	
2007–present	Una familia de diez	Executive producer	
2012–2014	La CQ	Creator and executive producer	
2013	Durmiendo con mi jefe	Executive producer	
2013–2014	María de todos los Ángeles	Executive producer (season 2)	
2016	Los González	Executive producer	
2017	Divina, está en tu corazón	Associate producer	
2017–2023	Renta congelada	Creator and executive producer	
2018–2019	Simón dice	Creator and executive producer	
2019	Cita a ciegas	Writer and executive producer	
2021	Diseñando tu amor	Executive producer	
2021	Dr. Cándido Pérez	Executive producer	
2022–present	¿Tú crees?	Writer and executive producer	
2023–present	¡Chócalas Compayito!	Creator and executive producer	
2023–2024	Minas de pasión	Executive producer	
2024–2025	Amor amargo	Executive producer	
2024–present	La CQ: nuevo ingreso	Creator and executive producer	
2025–present	Tomy Zombie	Creator and executive producer	
2026	Corazón de oro	Executive producer	
2026	Cuando fui bonita	Writer and executive producer	

== Awards and nominations ==
=== TVyNovelas Awards ===
Year	Category	Nominated work	Result	Ref.
2008	Best Comedy Program	Una familia de diez	Nominated	
2014	Best Unit Program	La CQ	Nominated	
2014	Best Series	María de todos los Ángeles	Won	
2018	Best Comedy Series	Renta congelada	Nominated	
2019	Best Comedy Series	Simón dice	Nominated	
2020	Best Comedy Series	Simón dice	Nominated	
2020	Best Comedy Series	Una familia de diez	Nominated	

=== Kids Choice Awards Mexico ===
Year	Category	Nominated work	Result	Ref.
2013	Favorite TV Series	La CQ	Won	
2014	Favorite TV Series	La CQ	Won	
2014	Favorite Play	La CQ	Won	
