= Renta congelada =

- Genre: Sitcom
- Created by: Pedro Ortiz de Pinedo
- Written by: Óscar Ortiz de Pinedo Gutiérrez; José Sierra; César Ferrón; Magalli Urquieta
- Starring: Rodrigo Murray; Juan Diego Covarrubias; Regina Blandón; Patricia Manterola; José Eduardo Derbez; Adriana Montes de Oca; Faisy
- Country of origin: Mexico
- Original language: Spanish
- No. of seasons: 5
- No. of episodes: 62

Production
- Executive producer: Pedro Ortiz de Pinedo
- Producer: Daniel Rendón
- Running time: 21–24 minutes
- Production company: TelevisaUnivision

Original release
- Network: Las Estrellas
- Release: August 31, 2017 – July 6, 2023

Renta congelada (English title: Rent Freeze) is a Mexican sitcom created and produced by Pedro Ortiz de Pinedo for TelevisaUnivision. The series premiered on Las Estrellas on August 31, 2017. It stars Rodrigo Murray, Juan Diego Covarrubias, Regina Blandón, and Patricia Manterola. The series revolves around the life of two couples totally opposed to each other, who by chance are forced to live under the same roof. The series has been renewed for a fifth season, which premiered on 20 April 2023.

== Plot ==
=== Season 1 ===
The series begins when newly married vegan hipsters, Ana (Regina Blandón) and Fernando (Juan Diego Covarrubias), rent a house at a low price. However, they are surprised to discover a couple in their forties, Delia (Patricia Manterola) and Federico (Rodrigo Murray), already living in the house, and who claim to have signed the same lease for five years. Both couples are right, because the elderly owner, who has Alzheimer's, signed both contracts just before dying, so legally both couples have the same rights. This mistake happened because of the similarity in Federico and Fernando's names. Each couple hope that the other will grow tired of the arrangement and leave, but since no one will go, they will be forced to live together for five years.

=== Season 2 ===
Delia and Federico, and Ana and Fernando must put aside their fight to get the others out of the house and work together to raise 500,000 pesos in less than three months to pay a debt that the former owner inherited, and to be able to free the mortgage to keep the house.

=== Season 3 ===
After Fernando is tricked by Federico and his best friend Luis Alberto (Faisy) to go look for Ana who seems to be lost, new comers rent the house. This is because Luis Alberto tricked Fernando into singing papers to leave him in charge of his finances. Luis Alberto rents the house to a couple for a one-year lease. Sam (Adriana Montes de Oca), a woman with extreme needs of cleanliness and hygiene, and Nico (José Eduardo Derbez), an extreme cheapskate who will do anything to save a buck. Luis Alberto allies himself with Nico and Sam to kick Federico and Delia out.

=== Season 4 ===
Ana returns home and wants to take Fernando to Brunei, but he decides to stay. Luis Alberto comes to live as Fernando's roomie. Ana asks Fernando for a divorce, making him feel heartbroken and depressed, but soon falls in love with a drugstore clerk named Lucía (Violeta Isfel). Meanwhile, Federico and Delia decide to become parents by adopting Tommy.

=== Season 5 ===
Delia divorces Federico after he fakes a terminal illness just to keep the house, Nico goes on tour with his former show's co-stars, Federico decides to rent a room in the house, being rented by Milton (Harold Azuara) who in turn gives it to his mother Yolanda (Roxana Castellanos), a singer and former member of the group G-latinas who lives from the bone past of the 80's to make a reunion comeback.

== Cast ==
=== Main ===
- Rodrigo Murray as Federico
- Juan Diego Covarrubias as Fernando
- Regina Blandón as Ana (seasons 1–2; guest season 4)
- Patricia Manterola as Delia (seasons 1–4; guest season 5)
- José Eduardo Derbez as Nico Ramos (seasons 3–4; recurring season 5)
- Adriana Montes de Oca as Samantha (seasons 3–5)
- Faisy as Luis Alberto (season 4; recurring seasons 1–3)
- Violeta Isfel as Lucía (season 5; recurring season 4)
- Harold Azuara as Milton (season 5; recurring seasons 1–4)
- Roxana Castellanos as Yolanda (season 5)

=== Recurring ===
- Héctor Sandarti as Carlos

== Production ==
The series is created by Pedro Ortiz de Pinedo and produced by Televisa. Filming of the series began on June 12, 2017. A total of 13 episodes were confirmed for the first season. Production of the second season began on July 9, 2018. Production of the third season began on March 5, 2020, however filming was suspended at the end of the same month due to the COVID-19 pandemic in Mexico. Filming resumed on June 8, 2020 and concluded in late July 2020. Filming of the fifth season began on February 8, 2023.

== Episodes ==
=== Series overview ===
Season	Episodes	Originally released	
Season	Episodes	First released	Last released
1	13	August 31, 2017	November 23, 2017
2	13	February 28, 2019	May 23, 2019
3	12	September 3, 2020	November 19, 2020
4	12	April 28, 2022	July 21, 2022
5	12	April 20, 2023	July 6, 2023

=== Season 1 (2017) ===
No. overall	No. in season	Title	Original release date
1	1	"Mi casa es tu casa"	August 31, 2017
A confusion forces Ana and Fernando, a young married couple, as well as Delia and Federico, a marriage worn by the monotony, to share the same house, which both couples rented at a low price at the same time without knowing it.
2	2	"De chile, dulce y pozole"	September 7, 2017
Ana and Fernando partially resigned to share the house, they decide to install their furniture, which causes the annoyance of Federico, who never ceases to annoy the hipsters as he nicknames them, inciting the constant attack between both couples.
3	3	"Alta seducción"	September 14, 2017
The suspicious interest of Fernando towards Delia, gives a valuable tool to Federico to get rid of the annoying hípsters, devising a machiavellian plan, that has like objective the rupture between Ana and Fernando; making believe that Fernando is unfaithful.
4	4	"Pinto mi raya"	September 21, 2017
The coexistence is still tense. Fernando proposes the division of the whole house, and chaos begins. Federico alters the fair division they had raised at the outset. Ana and Delia, as punishment, send them to sleep together in the room.
5	5	"La ley del hielo"	September 28, 2017
Fernando's mom wants to see him to give him some great news. Ana does not have a good relationship with her mother-in-law. Federico and Delia are aware of the tension between them, so Federico decides to convince her to stay longer, without imagining how the world will shake both couples.
6	6	"Tuvo, tubo"	October 5, 2017
The great interest of Ana by her cell phone causes a series of misunderstandings, Federico takes advantage of it to be able to stay with the house. Fernando feels ignored by his wife, and falls into the temptation - incited by his to visit a table dance. Delia invites Ana to the spa of her idolater Madame Patú.
7	7	"Fuera de lugar"	October 12, 2017
Federico and Fernando are taken to the street by Ana and Delia, who are very annoyed by the scene found when returning from the spa. A video of Fernando eating meat, unleashes the anger of Ana. The end of this entanglement, perhaps it is not what Federico had in mind.
8	8	"El quinto inquilino"	October 19, 2017
There is a ghost that lives in the basement. Federico takes advantage of this situation to frighten the others. What he doesn't suspect, is that Ana and Fernando have the same idea. The problem is, when in fact, something paranormal begins to upset them.
9	9	"Prefiero mi arte"	October 26, 2017
Ana has her first opportunity to exhibit at the Annual Expo Hipster Art Edition. Her lack of creativity, added to the scandalous game of Fernando, Federico and Luis Alberto in the new pool table, puts in trouble her participation.
10	10	"Viaje todo pagado"	November 2, 2017
Federico wins a trip all paid at the annual party of his company. Ana sees on this trip, an unbeatable opportunity to throw them out. Federico suspects it and decides to refuse the trip. Delia receives the recipe of abundance, and writes it down in Fernando's notebook; This causes him to get fired from his job.
11	11	"Hoy cena Pancho"	November 9, 2017
Ana and Fernando are desperate for the lack of employment, to the degree of wanting to sell their valuable belongings. Luis Alberto pleads for his friend in the office, so he invites Don Pancho, Fernando's former boss, to dinner. The only problem is that Federico and Delia have to pretend to be the uncles to not explain their presence.
12	12	"Acción Legal"	November 16, 2017
The terrible austerity lived in the house is unsustainable. Fernando and Ana discover that Federico and Delia never pay their fair share of electricity, for this reason they are cut off from electricity. Fernando will manage to solve the problem with one condition.
13	13	"Sálvense quien pueda"	November 23, 2017
The sickly coexistence between the couples ends up exploding. The final result is the total destruction of the furniture, goods and provisions. Carlos the lawyer, gives them a news that threatens their future.

=== Season 2 (2019) ===
No. overall	No. in season	Title	Original release date
14	1	"Sin casa no hay paraíso"	February 28, 2019 (Note: Premiered early online through Las Estrellas website and YouTube channel on February 26, 2019.)
Ana and Fernando strive to survive the first night evicted by evading Delia and Federico, but after discovering the fraud they were victims of, they decide to join forces to recover the house.
15	2	"Intolerante a la lactosa"	March 7, 2019
Ana, Fernando, Delia and Federico return home, but they will have to pay half a million pesos in three months to stay. Fernando finds work at Gastarpocks as a barista and Ana painting a mural, while Federico drinks some experimental dairy products that Fernando brings home and has an allergic reaction.
16	3	"El extraño retorno del horrible trinchador"	March 14, 2019
Ana intends to sell one of her sculptures, but the buyer is actually interested in Federico's cupboard, for which he is willing to pay a fortune. But the cupboard is destroyed. Ana joins Federico to rebuild and sell the horrible cupboard.
17	4	"El santo de los tomates"	March 21, 2019
Fernando points out to Ana that her true talent is to plant organic tomatoes. Ana decides to start her YouTube channel and discovers in her tomatoes the image of a saint whom they can charge to worship. Fernando uploads a photo to the internet of "Santo-mate saladette" and goes viral. Guest stars: Danielle Dithurbide as herself, María Chacón as Nicole
18	5	"Por-no dejar"	March 28, 2019
Federico buys a video camera with part of the savings money to pay the house's debt and decides to earn money by uploading videos to Pornogram and he secretly films Ana and Fernando’s intimacies. Ana starts her music video channel and starts gaining money.
19	6	"Hotel Garage"	April 4, 2019
Ana decides to rent her studio as a bedroom and does a casting to find the possible tenants. Federico gets a job as a driver on an app, while Delia will sell cookies baked by herself.
20	7	"Borrón y cuenta nueva"	April 11, 2019
Fernando’s former boss goes to Gastarpocks and Luis Alberto convinces him to give him everything for free to get his job back. Ana has a stalker fan. Federico finds a job at the pharmacy and will get extra money after selling medicines without a prescription. Guest star: Andrea Torre as La Nena
21	8	"La hipstéria"	April 18, 2019
Ana and Fernando discover that there is a serial killer of hipsters nearby and all the evidence points to the fact that Federico is responsible. Delia and Ana will make an alliance. Guest stars: Dalilah Polanco as Beatriz, Claudia Acosta as Carla
22	9	"Encadenados"	April 25, 2019
As there is no meat for Federico to eat, he will be forced to look for a job and find one that will chain him. Ana gets an opportunity to be the opening act to the concert of Los condechi de la Roma, Fernando strives to be the best barista to go with her.
23	10	"Madame Deli"	May 2, 2019
Delia is disappointed in Madame Patú, so Federico asks Fer and Ana for help to make Delia believe that she would be a better seer and thus fool some unsuspecting customers when she reads the cards to them in Gastar Pocks.
24	11	"Hijo pródigo"	May 9, 2019
Antolín, Federico's brother arrives for a visit and for everyone he is a charm, except for Federico, who thinks he hides something shady. Ana and Fernando enjoy seeing how Federico suffers at the side of his brother.
25	12	"Código postal (Parte 1)"	May 16, 2019
Neither of the two couples has money and they are two days away from being evicted for not paying the debt. Federico enrolls everyone in the house in a game show to win a million pesos, so Fernando and Ana must act as his son and daughter against another family.
26	13	"Código postal (Parte 2)"	May 23, 2019
After winning the million pesos from the game show, Fernando loses everything and the lawyer arrives to evict the inhabitants of the house.

=== Season 3 (2020) ===
No. overall	No. in season	Title	Original release date
27	1	"Buscando a Ana"	September 3, 2020
Federico, fed up with Fernando not coming out of his depression for Ana, finds the opportunity to send him to Nairobi to look for her, helped by Luis Alberto. He and Delia have managed to keep the house.
28	2	"Esto es guerra"	September 10, 2020
Nico and Sam have just rented the house where Delia and Federico live. Given this, the current tenants will declare war on them.
29	3	"Guerra sin cuartel"	September 17, 2020
Federico readies his lethal weapons to kick out Sam and Nico out of the house. Luis Alberto advises them to use Nico's skills when he was a child magician in “Chiquillando”.
30	4	"La Planchada"	September 24, 2020
Federico makes Sam believe that the ghost of "La Planchada" haunts her. To get revenge, Luis Alberto and his goddaughter scare Federico and Delia with "La Niña del aro" to drive them out of the house.
31	5	"Gurú Mino"	October 1, 2020
Taking advantage of Delia's naivety, Luis Alberto pretends to be a fortune-teller to advise her to leave the house. Federico harnesses the powers of a true sorcerer to run off the invaders.
32	6	"La Expuerquis"	October 8, 2020
Federico has an unfortunate reunion with his ex-girlfriend Margarita, which causes Delia to be furious with him.
33	7	"Guardería Ájale"	October 15, 2020
Sam and Nico discover that Federico has a phobia of children, so they plan to turn the house into a daycare. Federico will do everything possible to get them out and discovers a secret weapon.
34	8	"Doctor Callo"	October 22, 2020
Nico and Federico fight to see which of them is the best podiatrist on the block. Delia steals Nico's clientele and Sam is forced to take a training course with a coffee expert.
35	9	"El Reencuentro"	October 29, 2020
Nico receives an invitation to participate in a reunion of 'Chiquillando', the television program that made him famous, but he does not know that it is all a trap by Federico.
36	10	"Qué mal Tino"	November 5, 2020
Tino, the successful magician and Nico's former partner in Chiquillando, has arrived in town to present a spectacular show. Federico takes the opportunity to invite him to the house and humiliate Nico.
37	11	"Federico da el anillo"	November 12, 2020
Federico sees the opportunity to get Nico and Sam out of the house by adopting a child from the street, but he must be married, so, after years of living with Delia, he gives her the engagement ring.
38	12	"Todos contra todos"	November 19, 2020
Fernando returns to claim the house, finding himself surprised by Sam and Nico. The war to see who takes out who is unleashed, causing a battle.

=== Season 4 (2022) ===
No. overall	No. in season	Title	Original release date
39	1	"Renta congelada"	April 28, 2022
Ana returns to win Fernando back and proposes to live in Brunei Darussalam.
40	2	"Samita la huerfanita"	May 5, 2022
Sam relives her past when she receives a call from her mother. A social worker wants to take Tomy away from Delia and Federico.
41	3	"A jalar Fernando"	May 12, 2022
Fernando looks for a new job to support himself. Sam has a crisis and decides not to clean anything.
42	4	"A pedalear en friegui"	May 19, 2022
Fernando struggles as a delivery man and Luis Alberto gives him a crash course. Federico and Nico fight over the bedroom.
43	5	"Nico-N chochos te queremos"	May 26, 2022
The cast of Chiquillando is disappearing and Nico is worried about his safety. Meanwhile, Ana asks Fernando for a divorce.
44	6	"Las chiqui mamis"	June 2, 2022
Fernando's mother visits and plans to stay with him along with her friend Lulu.
45	7	"No hay pedido"	June 9, 2022
Federico intercepts the neighbors' deliveries. Fernando is on trial. Nico follows the Chiquillando cast on tour.
46	8	"Irene, yo y mi otro yo"	June 16, 2022
Irene arrives at the house to find her lover, Luis Alberto and Fernando fight over her. Meanwhile Sam tries to take Milton's job.
47	9	"La maldición del tarot"	June 23, 2022
The government wants to demolish the house to build a bicycle path, but Nico, Fernando and Federico try to stop them.
48	10	"Miss Deli"	July 7, 2022
Delia and Federico are determined to homeschool Tommy. Meanwhile, Fernando meets the other love of his life.
49	11	"Viernes 13"	July 14, 2022
Delia doesn't want to have Tommy's party on Friday the 13th and everything goes wrong as expected. Federico and Luis Alberto think they are cousins.
50	12	"El sonámbulo"	July 21, 2022
Nico starts waking up in the street and everyone thinks he is sleepwalking. Meanwhile, Fernando invites Lucía to live at the house.

=== Season 5 (2023) ===
No. overall	No. in season	Title	Original release date
51	1	"El karma es Karmón"	April 20, 2023
Federico is forced to rent his room to Yolanda, Milton's mother. Milton takes the opportunity to approach Sam, since Nico has left her. Fernando and Lucía move into Federico's old room.
52	2	"Sin Yolanda, Maricarmen"	April 27, 2023
Yolanda changes the layout of the furniture, provoking an argument with Lucía. Federico takes advantage of the situation to try to get Fernando out of the house and allies himself with Yolanda.
53	3	"Infeliz cumpleaños"	May 4, 2023
When Lucía forgets Fernando's birthday, Federico and Yolanda take the opportunity to separate them. Milton sends Nico a fake tiger repellent from Sam that causes a tragedy.
54	4	"Deudas, suegras y otros preservativos"	May 11, 2023
Sam deals with Nico's death by getting into debt. Margarita, Fernando's mother, meets Lucía and is fascinated, to the point of wanting a grandchild.
55	5	"Sin globito no hay fiesta"	May 18, 2023
Fernando and Lucía think they are having a baby. Meanwhile, Milton convinces Sam to take several jobs to pay off her debts.
56	6	"Cinco años no es nada"	May 25, 2023
Fernando and Federico will soon own the house, but Fernando wants to sell it, so Federico starts an argument between him and Lucía, telling her that Fernando is sad about his ex-girlfriend in order to separate them so they don't have to sell.
57	7	"La visita de Tomy"	June 1, 2023
Tomy visits Federico and destroys his illusions of one day being able to get Delia back. Lucía wants Federico out of the house. Sam misses Nico.
58	8	"La yegua de Troya"	June 8, 2023
Federico beats Elena at the arcade and asks her to pretend to be his girlfriend to make Delia jealous and get rid of Yolanda, but Elena flirts with Fernando.
59	9	"Mi pequeño puerquito"	June 15, 2023
Two guys posing as fumigators lock up Federico and Yolanda, but they manage to escape to give them their due.
60	10	"El último deseo"	June 22, 2023
Sam receives Nico's ashes and fulfills his will to scatter them in the sound stage where he filmed Chiquillando.
61	11	"El trabajo perfecto"	June 29, 2023
Yolanda no longer plans to pay rent to Federico, who goes out to look for a job.
62	12	"Vender o no vender"	July 6, 2023
Fernando tries to convince Federico to sell the house, while Lucía suggests Yolanda to look for another place to live.

== Awards and nominations ==
Year	Award	Category	Nominated	Result
2018	TVyNovelas Awards	Best Comedy Program	Pedro Ortiz de Pinedo	Nominated
2020	TVyNovelas Awards	Best Actress in a Comedy Series	Regina Blandón	Nominated
