= Maribel Guardia =

Costa Rican-Mexican actress

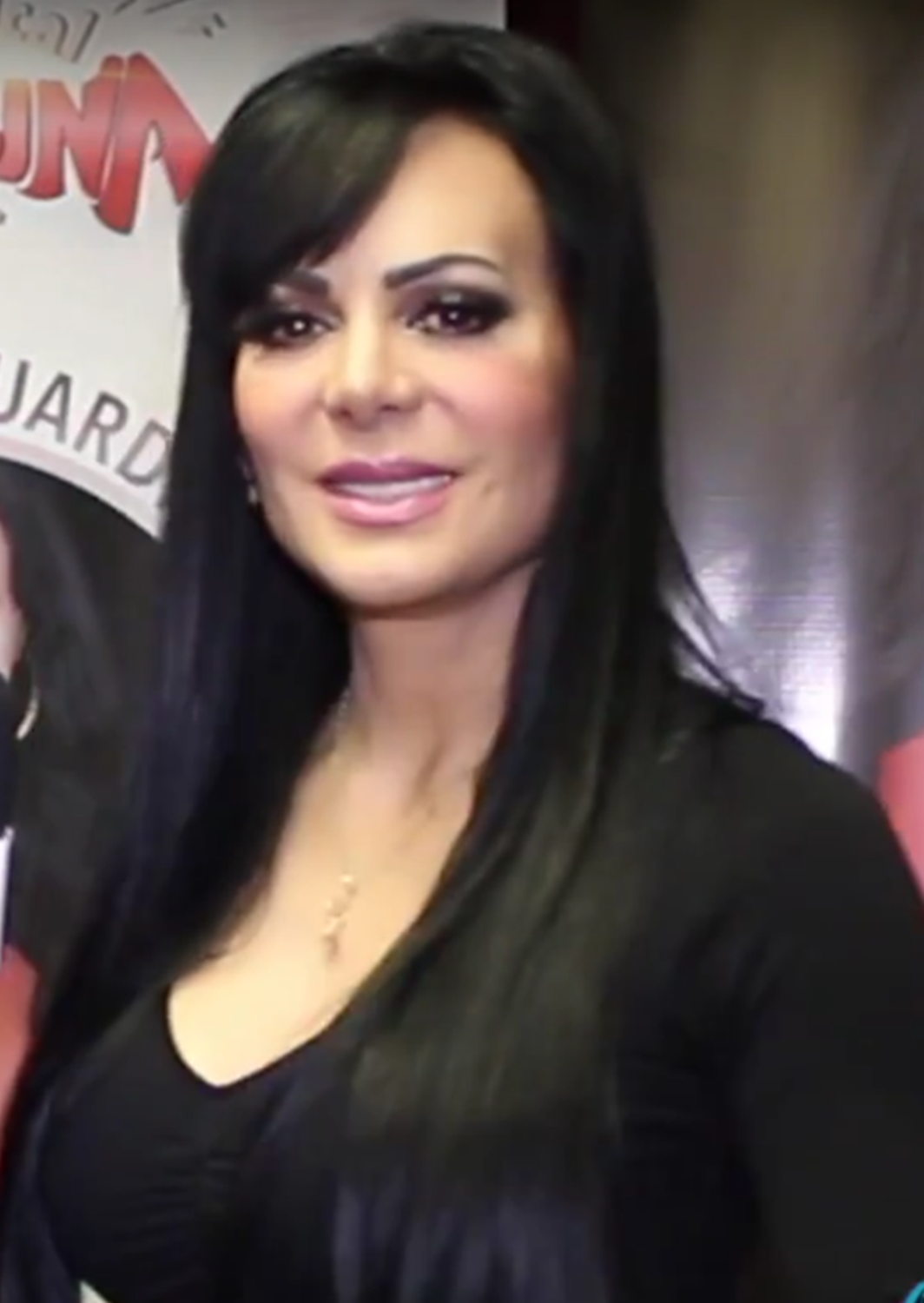
- Guardia in 2017
- Born: Maribel del Rocío Fernández García; 29 May 1959 (age 67); San José, Costa Rica
- Occupations: Actress; model; television personality; singer
- Years active: 1978–present
- Title: Miss Costa Rica 1978
- Spouses: Joan Sebastián (m. 1992; div. 1996) Marco Chacón (m. 2010)
- Children: 1
- Musical career
- Origin: Mexico City, Mexico
- Genres: Grupero; mariachi; banda
- Labels: Discos América; Discos Montaña; Orfeón; Plus Music; Tico Sounds

Maribel del Rocío Fernández García (born 29 May 1959), known professionally as Maribel Guardia, (Note: In this name that follows Hispanic American naming customs, the surname is Fernández and the second or maternal family name is García.; Pronounced Spanish pronunciation: [maɾiˈβel ˈɣwaɾðja]) is a Costa Rican-Mexican actress, singer, and television personality. She began her career as a beauty pageant contestant in Costa Rica, where she won Miss Costa Rica 1978 and went on to represent the country at Miss World 1978. Since 1980, she has worked in Mexico, appearing in numerous telenovelas, fichera films, and variety shows. She has also developed a career as a singer of Regional Mexican music.

== Miss Universe and Miss World ==
Guardia was elected Miss Costa Rica in 1978, going on to represent her country at the Miss Universe 1978 beauty pageant (did not place but was selected as Miss Photogenic) and the Miss World 1978 beauty pageant (placed as a top 15 semi-finalist). The Miss Universe pageant had been held in Acapulco. She received offers by Televisa producer Sergio Bustamante to develop a career there, but she returned to her country. Months later, she accepted the offer and returned to Mexico, leaving her mother and boyfriend.

== Acting and singing career ==
Guardia moved to Mexico in 1980, which proved crucial for her show business career. In 1980, she appeared in her first television show alongside Manuel "El Loco" Valdés.

Guardia went on to make multiple telenovelas (soap operas) and release a series of albums in the Norteño music genre. She has been signed to three different labels since her debut album was released in 1988: first with Musart Records, then from the late-1990s until the mid-2000s with Fonovisa Records, and in recent years with EMI Televisa Music in Latin America and Capitol Records in the United States.

Guardia has acted alongside important actors, including Andrés García, Saul Lisazo, and Joan Sebastian. One of her major soap opera hits was alongside Sebastian. Together, they filmed Tú y yo. One film where she acted alongside Andrés García was Pedro Navaja, where she played the main character's wife. She also did a film called El Rey de Los Taxistas alongside Luis de Alba. She and another El Rey de Los Taxistas co-star, Aida Pierce, would work together again in the telenovela Serafin. She hosted the OTI Festival 1998 along Rafael Rojas.

Additionally, she has done telenovelas for children. In 2006, she also did a sitcom called ¡Qué madre tan padre! and the variety show Muévete. In 2007, she was included in the book Televisa Presenta, commemorating fifty years of network television in Mexico.

In 2008, she released a new album; the leading single is "De Pecho A Pecho" (From Chest To Chest) written by the Nicaraguan composer, songwriter, and singer Hernaldo Zúñiga. Apart from her acting and singing jobs, she has also modeled for various calendars and magazines sold to her fans. Guardia also dated Jose Trujillo in the late 1970s.

Since late 2010, she has married Marco Chacón and lived with her son in Mexico City. Guardia has been inducted into the Paseo de las Luminarias in Mexico City.

In January 2010, she announced that she had worked all of 2009 on a new studio album, set to be released on February 13, 2010, under EMI Music, titled "Move You On – Muévete", which contained 12 tracks recorded in Mexico City, Texas and Colombia, eight tracks were in Spanish, the other four were in English.

== Personal life ==
Guardia lived with Joan Sebastian for five years and had a son with him, Julián Figueroa. Julián Figueroa followed in his parents' footsteps, pursuing a music career. On 9 April 2023, Julián Figueroa was found dead at his home at the age of 27.

== Television ==
Year	Title	Character	Note
2025	Cómplices	Roberta	Main role
2022	Albertano contra los mostros	Lola D'Bo	Main role
2020	Te doy la vida	Silvia	Guest star
2019	Vecinos	Tía Oli	Episode: "Hoy juega México"
2014-15	Muchacha italiana viene a casarse	Julieta Michel	Recurring role
2012–23	Corona de lágrimas	Julieta Vasquez	Main cast
2011-12	Una familia con suerte	Isabella Ruiz	Guest star
2010	Niña de mi Corazón	Pilar Alarcón de Arrioja	Main cast
2007-08	Al diablo con los guapos	Rosario Ramos / Rosella di Yano	Recurring role
2006	¡Qué madre tan padre!	Maribel Galicia	Lead role
2004-05	Misión S.O.S. aventura y amor	Ximena Aranda	Lead role
2001	Aventuras En El Tiempo	Flor del Huerto	Lead role
1999	Serafín	Carmen	Lead role
1996-97	Tú y yo	Estela Díaz Infante	Lead role
1994	Prisionera de amor	Cristina Carbajal / Florencia Rondán	Lead role
1986	Seducción	Marina	Lead role

== Notes ==
Awards and achievements
Preceded by (Trinidad and Tobago) Janelle Commissiong	Miss Universe – Photogenic Award; 1978	Succeeded by (England) Carolyn Seaward
Preceded by Claudia María Garnier Arias	Miss Costa Rica; 1978	Succeeded by Carla Facio Franco
