= Una familia de diez =

- Genre: Sitcom
- Created by: Jorge Ortiz de Pinedo; Pedro Ortiz de Pinedo
- Written by: Luis Bautista
- Directed by: Jorge Ortiz de Pinedo
- Starring: Jorge Ortiz de Pinedo; Eduardo Manzano; Zully Keith; Andrea Torre; Mariana Botas; Jessica Segura; Moisés Iván Mora; Daniela Luján; Ricardo Margaleff; María Fernanda García; Tadeo Bonavides; Camila Rivas; Carlos Ignacio; Patricia Martínez; Victoria Viera; Wendy Braga; Oswaldo Zarate; Luz Edith Rojas
- Opening theme: "Una familia de 10" by Juan Carlos Ortega and Al Castillo
- Country of origin: Mexico
- Original language: Spanish
- No. of seasons: 13
- No. of episodes: 190 (list of episodes)

Production
- Executive producers: Jorge Ortiz de Pinedo; Pedro Ortiz de Pinedo
- Producers: Ramón Salomón G.; Daniel Rendón
- Editor: Jorge Silva
- Production company: TelevisaUnivision

Original release
- Network: Las Estrellas
- Release: March 22, 2007 – present

Related
- ¿Tú crees?

Una familia de diez (English title: The 10 of Us), also known as Una familia de diez + 2 for the second season, is a Mexican sitcom that centers on the López household, a middle class Mexican family that constantly endures hilarious situations. They live in an apartment which barely holds living space for them. It premiered on Las Estrellas on March 22, 2007.

Production of the series ended in December 2024. The twelfth season premiered on September 28, 2025. The thirteenth and final season premiered on September 13, 2026.

== Plot ==
Plácido López is a middle-class accountant who is tiring of being the sole provider for his family, his wife Renata and his 2 children, Plutarco and Martina. They live very happily in a small apartment in the Colonia Doctores in Mexico City.

Five years ago, Aunt Licha and her daughter (whom they call La Nena) have arrived since both were abandoned by her husband, after he "uncovered" as homosexual. Then a year ago, Don Arnoldo López, Plácido's father, moved to live with them since he has nowhere else to go.

Subsequently, an indigenous named Tecla is integrated, who comes from the same town where Don Arnoldo lived ("Apaseo el Grande") and by accident makes constant references about Don Arnoldo having a secret relationship with her mother.

Placido works in a company that belongs to Don Justo Del Valle (a very rich man), who has a daughter named Gabriela del Valle (Gaby) from whom Plutarco falls deeply and instantly in love. Plutarco and Gaby marry secretly, after they learn that they will become parents, which is why Gaby moves in with the López family. A few chapters later, Aldolfo, La Nena's boyfriend also arrives and moves in, after finding out that La Nena is also pregnant.

Thus, in a short time, the tranquility of the López home becomes an agglomeration of ten people in the small apartment. There is endless fun and funny problems, mainly derived from the lack of space, economic problems and the ingenuity and humor of each of the characters as well as some other sporadic characters that give a special touch to this series. In the final episode of the series, due to good luck, in a television contest, the López win a house.

In season two, after the house they won more than ten years ago burns down, they are now forced to return to the apartment complex where they lived before. But, now with two new members, the children of Plutarco & Gaby (Justito), La Nena & Aldolfo (Victoria), the López family will live new troubles and problems, which will be solve with the support of the whole family.

== Cast and characters ==
Characters from left to right: Plutarco, Gaby, "Licha", Renata, Placido, Martina, Tecla, Don Arnoldo, La Nena, and Aldolfo.

- Jorge Ortiz de Pinedo as Plácido López, the level-headed, down to earth, patriarch of the family, Renata's husband, Plutarco and Martina's father. He was abandoned by his own father (Don Arnoldo) at the age of five. Plácido works as an accountant for Don Justo del Valle. He is pessimistic, due to the laziness of most of his family. Every time Plácido complains, he reflects the spectacle and political situations that are happening at that time period.
- Eduardo Manzano as Don Arnoldo López, Plácido's father, Plutarco and Martina's grandfather. He is a glutton, favoring tamales and other Mexican dishes and hates work. His witty remarks and ability to mimic various figures (a reflection of Manzano's previous work as el Polivoz) make him a favorite among those who surround him. He abandoned Plácido during his fifth birthday, and returned after some 50 years to live with his son and his family. He asked Plácido to let his goddaughter Tecla stay and work for food. Tecla always brings up that Don Arnoldo had a secret relationship with her mother in their rural town of "Apaseo el Grande", which makes him uncomfortable. He claims to have worked in many motion pictures of the Golden Age of Mexican Cinema and in Hollywood, while claiming to know many important Mexican and American actors, but he actually only knows actress Silvia Pinal; they met in Acapulco where he worked as a boater. In season 6, it's revealed he actually does know the people he claims to have met, and left for Hollywood to star in new movies. He still stays in contact with his family and updating them with what movie he's currently working in, all parodies of existing films with a food-pun title (example being Robin Food instead of Robin Hood).
- Zully Keith as Renata González de López, Plácido's wife, Plutarco and Martina's mother. She is a hardworking and optimistic housewife, who often confuses her past love interests and affairs during her youth with her husband Plácido. She is in some way an antithesis of her husband, always trying to be happy, but is also very distracted and sometimes says what she thinks. Due to her good nature, Renata is the only one in the household to get along with everyone, and does not have a feud or troubles with people.
- Andrea Torre as La Nena, Licha's daughter, Plácido and Renata's niece, Plutarco and Martina's cousin, Aldolfo's wife and Victoria's mother. She is a hard worker and intelligent young woman who worries about her mother. She works as a kindergarten teacher and is the pride of her uncle Plácido. Her cousin Martina and her have a mutual dislike for each other, with both of them insulting each other frequently. Her mother Licha constantly argues with her, but in reality they love each other a lot. In part due to her mother Licha's forceful repression and also due to her own nature, she sometimes shows her lustful side and fairly deep attraction for men. Unlike Licha, she has a very good relationship with her father and accepts his new alternative lifestyle.
- Mariana Botas as Martina López, Plácido and Renata's fresa daughter and Plutarco's sister. She is a young prepotent, arrogant girl, who wants to be wealthy and fashionable and constantly complains that her family is not rich and important like the families of her school friends. A common trope is Martina's constant use of brand name tags that she sews to her own clothing to pretend she wears brand name clothing. She does not get along with her cousin La Nena, but has a good relationship with her grandfather Don Arnoldo (despite having called him a "naco" at first sight), and with virtually everyone else in the family. Despite her putdowns and brash behavior, Martina loves her family.
- Jessica Segura as Tecla (season 1–2), Don Arnoldo's goddaughter from Apaseo el Grande and the housekeeper of the López. She was recommended by her godfather to cook and clean in the house. A stereotypical native woman, she is very humble and hardworking, though somewhat ignorant and very much manipulated by the family. She sometimes mentions her godfather's secret relationship with her mother which makes the family believe she might be Plácido's half-sister, making him crash Tecla against the dishes in the kitchen. She wants to become an actress and is picked on frequently, mainly by Plutarco and Martina. She is nicknamed "The Salma Hayek of Apaseo el Grande", "The daughter of Dolores del Río", "India María", and "Daughter of Frida Kahlo". She says she wants to be an "actora", rather than the correct term actríz. In the season 2 finale, she leaves the López home to finally become an actress.
- Moisés Iván Mora as Aldolfo, La Nena's husband and Victoria's father. His birth name is Aldolfo Mao Emiliano Lenin Fidel Castro Cienfuegos and was born in the Estadio Azteca in 1977 during a Pumas soccer game. He is a university student who was trying to become a lawyer but was dropped out for not paying his dues. He does not work, due to his political ideologies, since he is against capitalism and supports communism. He dresses very hippie like and always smells bad. He is a fan of Che Guevara. Later on, it turns out he has a wealthy mother who owns a large hamburger company. The reason why he never brought her up was because her lifesyle clashes with his ideals and principals, despite knowing her money would've help the family out on multiple occasions.
- Daniela Luján as Gaby del Valle de López (main, seasons 1–9; guest, season 10), Plutarco's wife, the daughter of Placido's employer (Don Justo) and Justito's mother. She is a beautiful, rich, elegant young woman, although clueless and clumsy like her husband. She likes everything that has to do with wealth and fortune but is kindhearted and humble. Plutarco and her have a lot things in common.
- Ricardo Margaleff as Plutarco López (main, seasons 1–9; guest, season 10), Plácido and Renata's extremely dimwitted son, Martina's brother, Gaby's husband and Justito's father. He is a naive and confused, usually bothering his father. He is always tumbling, tripping, or hitting himself against objects or people. Every time he does something stupid or foolish the family says he did a "plutarcada". Still, he's as protective of the family's integrity much like Placido, and also works, though this is of no assistance as he does it for free.
- María Fernanda García as Licha González (season 1–2, 4–present), Renata's sister and La Nena's mother. She is a hypochondriac who denies being "dramatic" in a loud and dramatic shout. She came to live with the López family when her husband abandoned her, creating a strong trauma for her and making her virtually hate all men. In addition to her often exaggerating with her illnesses, she seems to carry a deep victim complex which embitters La Nena. At the start of season 3, it appears she died after eating a tamale containing a filling that she was deathly allergic to, but in season 4 it was revealed she faked her death. In reality, she fell in love with an elderly man and after having enough with her living conditions, decided to move in with him while paying off the medical and funeral staff to keep the truth hidden from her family. When he died, she ended up draining his remaining funds so she goes back to her family, who are now extremely disgruntled with her lie.
- Camila Rivas (seasons 2–9) and Victoria Viera (season 10–present) as Victoria, Aldolfo and La Nena's daughter. When speaking, she imitates the lengthiness of the words that her father makes at the end of a sentence. Her expressions are very colloquial, and carry the same leanings of her parents.
- Tadeo Bonavides as Justo "Justito" López (main, seasons 2–9; guest, season 10), Plutarco and Gaby's son. He is a very intelligent child prodigy who expresses himself with strange synonyms that are hard to understand, which causes confusion and sometimes irritation with the family, in high contrast to his parents. He never calls his parents Father or Mother, instead calling them by their names. This is because he highly doubts he is their child and strongly believes he was mixed at birth. He still loves them and does things to make his family's life better.
- Carlos Ignacio as Carlos (guest, season 1; main, season 3–present), Licha's ex-husband and La Nena's father. He abandoned Licha to live with his gay partner Pierre. His stay with the family in the first season caused havoc around the house, which makes Placido furious. After Licha's death and fighting with Pierre again, he asks the López for asylum in their house and lends them his furniture. He also seems to dislike Aldolfo because he always mispronounces his name.
- Patricia Martínez as Jacinta (main, season 3; guest, season 4), Tecla's mother and the new housekeeper of the López. It is shown that she had an idyll with Don Arnoldo in the past and is his lover/fling. Unlike Tecla, who usually allowed Don Arnoldo to eat whatever he wanted, she is much more strict with him. She makes sure that Don Arnoldo does not eat as much as everyone else and denies him any extra meal for which he always slips away.
- Wendy Braga as Sol (season 10)
- Oswaldo Zárate as Julián (season 10)
- Luz Edith Rojas as Susi (season 10)

== Episodes ==
Season	Episodes	Originally released	
Season	Episodes	First released	Last released
1	24	March 22, 2007	September 13, 2007
2	13	August 25, 2019	October 6, 2019
3	13	October 13, 2019	November 24, 2019
4	13	August 23, 2020	October 4, 2020
5	13	October 4, 2020	November 15, 2020
6	15	September 5, 2021	October 24, 2021
7	15	October 24, 2021	December 19, 2021
8	15	September 11, 2022	October 30, 2022
9	15	October 30, 2022	December 18, 2022
10	15	September 24, 2023	November 5, 2023
11	15	September 15, 2024	December 22, 2024
12	14	September 28, 2025	December 28, 2025
13	16	September 13, 2026	TBA

== DVD release ==
DVD release cover.

In 2008, Televisa Home Entertainment released a 3-disc DVD set of the first season.

== Reception ==
=== Ratings ===
Viewership and ratings per season of Una familia de diez
Season	Episodes	First aired		Last aired		Avg. viewers (millions)
Season	Episodes	Date	Viewers (millions)	Date	Viewers (millions)	Avg. viewers (millions)
1	24	March 22, 2007	N/A	September 13, 2007	N/A	N/A
2	13	August 25, 2019	3.5	October 6, 2019	3.0	2.79
3	13	October 13, 2019	3.3	November 24, 2019	2.9	3.00
4	13	August 23, 2020	2.4	October 4, 2020	2.9	2.47
5	13	October 4, 2020	2.9	November 15, 2020	2.7	2.79
6	15	September 5, 2021	2.4	October 24, 2021	1.9	2.09
7	15	October 24, 2021	2.6	December 19, 2021	2.1	2.42
8	15	September 11, 2022	1.6	October 30, 2022	1.8	1.78
9	15	October 30, 2022	2.5	December 18, 2022	1.6	2.04
10	15	September 24, 2023	1.6	November 5, 2023	1.6	1.79
11	15	September 15, 2024	1.3	December 22, 2024	N/A	1.38
12	14	September 28, 2025	2.6	December 28, 2025	N/A	2.52
13	10	September 13, 2026	1.8	TBA	TBD	2.15

=== Awards and nominations ===
Year	Award	Category	Nominated	Result
2008	TVyNovelas Awards	Best Comedy Program	Jorge Ortiz de Pinedo and Pedro Ortiz de Pinedo	Nominated
2020	TVyNovelas Awards	Best Comedy Series	Jorge Ortiz de Pinedo and Pedro Ortiz de Pinedo	Nominated
2020	TVyNovelas Awards	Best Actor in a Comedy Series	Jorge Ortiz de Pinedo	Nominated

== Spin-off ==
On March 14, 2022, TelevisaUnivision announced a spin-off of the series starring Daniela Luján, Ricardo Margaleff and Tadeo Bonavides. The series premiered on July 31, 2022.
