= ¡Qué madre tan padre! =

2006 Mexican sitcom

- Genre: Sitcom
- Written by: Luis Bautista
- Directed by: Jorge Ortiz de Pinedo
- Starring: Maribel Guardia; Mauricio Castillo; Martha Ofelia Galindo; Lucila Mariscal; Tamara Vargas; Ricardo Margaleff; Jorge van Rankin; Mauricio Herrera; Stephanie Casteele; Kristel Casteele; Mauricio Bueno; María Chacón; Jorge Trejo
- Country of origin: Mexico
- Original language: Spanish
- No. of seasons: 1
- No. of episodes: 21

Production
- Executive producer: Jorge Ortiz de Pinedo
- Producers: Pedro Ortiz de Pinedo; Ramón Salomón
- Production location: Mexico
- Production company: Televisa

Original release
- Network: Las Estrellas
- Release: 25 January – 24 June 2006

¡Qué madre tan padre! is a Mexican sitcom that aired on Las Estrellas from 25 January 2006 to 24 June 2006. It is directed and produced by Jorge Ortiz de Pinedo for Televisa. It stars Maribel Guardia and Mauricio Castillo.

== Plot ==
Mauricio is a father who works as an architect in a major company and his wife Maribel attends the home full time, although she has a marketing profession, specializing in sales. The couple has five children: Andrés, Jessica, Sebastián and the twins Luz y Liz. Mauricio loses his job and he can not be placed in another company. The need makes Maribel find work, she meets an old school friend, who has a multilevel sales company and offers her a very interesting employment opportunity. She accepts and soon becomes the economic support of the family, while Mauricio, little by little and with great difficulty, begins to take charge of domestic chores. Maribel's demanding job forces her to be home late, not be able to eat with her family, to forget a little about her children and to deal with the jealousy that Mauricio feels for Mike, who is her boss and friend. Mauricio is forced to take over the purchase of food, take the children to school, face housekeeping, pay for services, do homework, and cook.

== Cast ==
- Maribel Guardia as Maribel Galicia
- Mauricio Castillo as Mauricio Hernández
- Martha Ofelia Galindo as Doña Magos
- Lucila Mariscal as Doña Lucha
- Tamara Vargas as Sinforosa
- Ricardo Margaleff as Animal
- Jorge van Rankin as Mike Well
- Mauricio Herrera as Don Suegro
- Stephanie Casteele as Liz Hernández
- Kristel Casteele as Luz Hernández
- Mauricio Bueno as Sebastián Hernández
- María Chacón as Jessica Hernández
- Jorge Trejo as Andrés Hernández

== Episodes ==
| No. | Title | Original release date |
|---|---|---|
| 1 | "Cambio de roles" | 25 January 2006 |
While Maribel works, her husband takes care of their children. Mauricio receives the visit of his mother and his mother-in-law at home, so he has to endure criticism for being unemployed.
| 2 | "Análisis estratégicos" | 1 February 2006 |
Maribel feels very pressured at work, since her boss asks her for a report of which she does not know the procedure. Mauricio receives a call for a job interview; however, he loses his appointment due to his domestic chores.
| 3 | "El festival" | 8 February 2006 |
Mauricio has to buy costumes for his twins, but he has no money, so he thinks of putting everyone to work as waiters at his mother's meeting; however, an incident causes everything to go wrong.
| 4 | "Esta noche cena Mike" | 15 February 2006 |
By a misunderstanding, Mike will go to dinner at Maribel's house, so she asks Mauricio to prepare dinner. Due to the antics of their daughters, everything turns out to be a disaster.
| 5 | "La separación" | 22 February 2006 |
The children think that their parents want to divorce, so they make Maribel think that her husband flirts the neighbors. Mauricio is convinced about Mike's bad intentions to seduce his wife.
| 6 | "Y se hizo la luz" | 1 March 2006 |
Mauricio and Maribel are surprised to see the receipt of the electricity bill, since the charge is very high. Mauricio visits the electric company to clarify the situation, but it is the owner who must fix the situation.
| 7 | "Papá a dos de tres caídas" | 8 March 2006 |
Mauricio thinks that the twins are disillusioned with him, so he tries to look good with them by pretending to be a famous fighter, however, the girls discover him. Maribel manages to get La Parka and Mascara Sagrada.
| 8 | "El novio de Magos" | 15 March 2006 |
Doña Magos receives an arrangement of flowers from an admirer; It leaves everyone surprised, so Mauricio is intrigued to meet the man who tries to seduce his mother. She meets her lover, who proposes marriage.
| 9 | "El vestido" | 22 March 2006 |
Mike will go on vacation, so he has to choose someone in charge of the office. Maribel thinks about wearing her lucky dress; however, Mauricio gets it dirty.
| 10 | "Los niños en la oficina" | 29 March 2006 |
Maribel takes the twins and Sebastián to her office, where they cause an innumerable list of mischief. Jessica and Andrés stay at their grandfather's dental office. Mauricio takes the opportunity to go in search of employment.
| 11 | "¿Y dónde están los niños?" | 5 April 2006 |
Mauricio begins to worry about his physique, as the neighbors mentioned him having gained weight. Maribel becomes addicted to the computer, so the children are careless and hungry.
| 12 | "Mauricio empleado" | 22 April 2006 |
Mauricio asks his son Andrés to send résumés to various companies; however, he plays a little joke and sends it to Maribel's boss. Mauricio gets a job at Mike's office.
| 13 | "El día del Niño" | 29 April 2006 |
Mauricio and Maribel plan to surprise their children to celebrate the day of the child. They are taken to Chabelo’s program, for this reason Mauricio follows his idol to a restaurant.
| 14 | "Qué madres son esas" | 6 May 2006 |
Mauricio forgets to make a reservation at the restaurant for Mother's Day. At the same time he has to attend the children's festival, so he has to figure out how to do everything at once.
| 15 | "La pluma" | 13 May 2006 |
The children get bad grades, so Mauricio and Maribel punish them with domestic chores. On the other hand, Maribel gets upset with her husband for a pen she had given him previously.
| 16 | "Se enfermaron los niños" | 20 May 2006 |
The twins have a strong infection in the stomach, due to the food that their dad made, so they stay at home in the care of their grandparents. Mauricio receives a call from his former boss, who proposes a new business.
| 17 | "La nueva asistente" | 27 May 2006 |
Maribel feels displaced in her work, because Mike hires a new assistant, who turns out to be an industrial spy. Meanwhile, Mauricio receives extra money, since an agency uses his image for a cream.
| 18 | "Me enamoré de Mauricio" | 3 June 2006 |
The Hernández family is forced to spend an afternoon with their family, so Maribel and Mauricio tell their children the story of how they fell in love.
| 19 | "Un día en el campo de batalla" | 10 June 2006 |
Mauricio and his family plan a picnic, however, they arrive in the territory of Mike, who insists on separating Maribel from her husband. For this, he plans to pass his rival moments of humiliation.
| 20 | "Atrapado sin salida" | 17 June 2006 |
Mauricio tries to clean the cistern; However, due to carelessness, he is held locked up, so Maribel and her children embark on an intense search. Finally, Andres and Jessica realize that their father was cloistered.
| 21 | "Los nuevos inquilinos" | 24 June 2006 |
Maribel is unemployed, because Mike lost everything. Don Leoncio and Gertrudis are stripped of their property. Finally, Mauricio finds a solution to improve the situation of his in-laws.
