= ¡Chócalas Compayito! =

2023 Mexican TV series

- Genre: Sitcom
- Created by: Pedro Ortiz de Pinedo; Oscar Ortiz de Pinedo
- Written by: Eduardo Tepichín; César Ferrón
- Directed by: Manolo Fernández; Sergio Adrián Sánchez
- Starring: Edson Zúñiga; Raúl Araiza; Mariazel Olle Casals; Claudia Acosta; Marcelo Barceló; Ana Paula del Moral; Rafael Inclán
- Country of origin: Mexico
- Original language: Spanish
- No. of seasons: 3
- No. of episodes: 43

Production
- Executive producer: Pedro Ortiz de Pinedo
- Producer: Ramón Salomón
- Production company: TelevisaUnivision

Original release
- Network: Las Estrellas
- Release: 8 July 2023 – 1 June 2025

¡Chócalas Compayito! is a Mexican sitcom television series produced by Pedro Ortiz de Pinedo for TelevisaUnivision. The series stars Edson Zúñiga as Compayito, a bare hand puppet character that Zúñiga first portrayed in 2001 for Televisa Deportes programming. It premiered on Las Estrellas on 8 July 2023. In January 2025, the series was renewed for a third season that premiered on 23 February 2025.

== Plot ==
In order to pay his debts, Compayito (Edson Zúñiga), a former sports commentator, is chased by loan sharks. While trying to flee, Compayito is run over by Zacarías Fernández (Raúl Araiza), who lost all his money trying to rescue companies in bankruptcy and now lives with his family at his father's house. Compayito is allowed to stay at the Fernández house and Zacarías sees this as an opportunity to fix his financial problems. Zacarías believes that if he can restore Compayito's fame, he will benefit from his success. However, Compayito will pretend he is still injured in order to avoid being caught by his creditors.

== Cast ==
=== Main ===
- Edson Zúñiga as Compayito
- Raúl Araiza as Zacarías Fernández
- Mariazel Olle Casals as Yadira Fernández de Fernández
- Claudia Acosta as Tomasa
- Marcelo Barceló as Elton Fernández
- Ana Paula del Moral as Agatha Fernández
- Rafael Inclán as Antonio
- José Luis Rodríguez "Guana" as Bruno (season 2)
- Rocío García as Zoila (season 2)

=== Guest stars ===
- Cynthia Urías as herself
- Roberto Tello
- Cecilia Galliano
- Sylvia Pasquel
- Lukas Urkijo as Lalo
- Toño De Valdés
- Paola Villalobos
- Samia
- Hugo Alcántara
- Javier Carranza
- Marisol González
- Enrique Burak

== Episodes ==
Series	Episodes	Originally released	
Series	Episodes	First released	Last released
1	12	8 July 2023	23 September 2023
2	17	1 September 2024	22 December 2024
3	14	23 February 2025	1 June 2025

=== Season 1 (2023) ===
No. overall	No. in season	Title	Original release date
1	1	"Partida de ma... no"	8 July 2023
2	2	"Tarjetas hechas a mano"	15 July 2023
3	3	"Manita caliente"	22 July 2023
4	4	"Una manita caída... por la desgracia"	29 July 2023
5	5	"Mano en el área"	5 August 2023
6	6	"A manos llenas"	12 August 2023
7	7	"Manito date cuenta"	19 August 2023
8	8	"Her-manita de mi corazón"	26 August 2023
9	9	"Me agarró de la mano del chango"	2 September 2023
10	10	"No busques mano ajena"	9 September 2023
11	11	"Juego de manos es de villanos"	16 September 2023
12	12	"Estamos a manos"	23 September 2023

=== Season 2 (2024) ===
No. overall	No. in season	Title	Original release date	Mexico viewers (millions)
13	1	"¿Quién o qué, es el Compayito?"	1 September 2024	1.40
14	2	"Parados por la mañana"	8 September 2024	1.61
15	3	"Yadira el tiempo"	15 September 2024	1.38
16	4	"Tanta Manuela cansa"	22 September 2024	1.50
17	5	"Zoila que te quiere, ya dirá Yadira"	29 September 2024	1.62
18	6	"El enmanazo"	6 October 2024	1.44
19	7	"¿Cuál recibo?"	13 October 2024	1.35
20	8	"Está china tu moneda"	20 October 2024	1.55
21	9	"Sube, Pelayo, sube"	27 October 2024	1.54
22	10	"Yadira influencer"	3 November 2024	1.22
23	11	"El Mano-ficio"	10 November 2024	1.68
24	12	"Se armó la gorda"	17 November 2024	1.31
25	13	"Haciendo cocinadas"	24 November 2024	1.16
26	14	"Esa mano no es mi mano"	1 December 2024	1.27
27	15	"Representamesta"	8 December 2024	N/A
28	16	"¿El fin de Parados por la mañana?"	15 December 2024	N/A
29	17	"Que gran partida de ma... no"	22 December 2024	N/A

=== Season 3 (2025) ===
No. overall	No. in season	Title	Original release date	Mexico viewers (millions)
30	1	"Deporte ado"	23 February 2025	2.32
31	2	"La huelga de 'parados por la mañana'"	2 March 2025	2.32
32	3	"Para seguir hablando, deposite otra moneda"	9 March 2025	1.88
33	4	"La buena, la mala y la voluptuosa"	16 March 2025	2.29
34	5	"Entre Sancho Villa y una reputación destruida"	23 March 2025	2.24
35	6	"¿Yadira y Bruno?"	30 March 2025	1.72
36	7	"La venta de catálogo"	6 April 2025	2.30
37	8	"Elton-eladas de amor"	13 April 2025	2.16
38	9	"Préstamos Don Chuchín"	20 April 2025	1.64
39	10	"El caza doñitas"	27 April 2025	2.34
40	11	"Poltergeist-tito"	4 May 2025	1.89
41	12	"Lo que no es de tu año"	11 May 2025	1.89
42	13	"De encuentro cercano, pasa a invasión"	18 May 2025	1.76
43	14	"Amor prohibido y secreto de amor"	1 June 2025	2.04

== Awards and nominations ==
Year	Award	Category	Nominated	Result	Ref
2024	Produ Awards	Best Sitcom	¡Chócalas Compayito!	Nominated	
