= One for the Road (2014 film) =

2014 film

- Film poster
- Directed by: Jack Zagha Kababie
- Written by: Jack Zagha Kababie
- Starring: Luis Bayardo; Eduardo Manzano; José Carlos Ruiz
- Release date: March 2014
- Running time: 93 minutes
- Country: Mexico
- Language: Spanish

One for the Road (Spanish: En el último trago) is a 2014 Mexican road comedy-drama film directed by Jack Zagha Kababie. It was one of fourteen films shortlisted by Mexico to be their submission for the Academy Award for Best Foreign Language Film at the 88th Academy Awards, but it lost out to 600 Miles. This film, translated into Russian by Andrey Efremov, was shown in Moscow in June 2014 as part of the Moscow International Film Festival under the title Выпьем на дорожку.

== Cast ==
- Luis Bayardo as Agustín
- Eduardo Manzano as Benito
- José Carlos Ruiz as Emiliano
