= Pedro Weber =

Mexican comedian and actor (1933-2016)

Pedro Manuel Weber Chavez (28 November 1933 – 22 March 2016) was a Mexican actor and comedian. Born in Ciudad Guzman, Jalisco, Weber was also known by the nickname "Chatanuga" (pronounced like the American city of Chattanooga, Tennessee). Weber was prolific in the Mexican cinema genre of the "ficheras"-Mexican sex comedies. Weber was considered by many as one of the primary actors of the genre.

== Early life ==
As a kid, Weber became interested in becoming a dancer. He initiated his show business career dancing at tents and balconies that doubled as movie theaters so that Ciudad Guzman townspeople could enjoy some kind of entertainment.

== Career ==
Before he became famous, Weber worked at a psychiatric hospital, "La Castaneda Hospital", for four years.

It was while acting in theater that Weber was discovered by the legendary actor Resortes. Resortes was looking for dancers for his show at the time. Weber was not chosen by Resortes, but he left an impression on the dancer and comedian. Weber soon traveled to the United States, where he became the Madison Square Garden's stage director.

Weber's career went on the rise during the 1960s, when he participated in a film named "Dos Caballeros de Espadas" ("Two Sword Men"), followed by "La Duquesa Diabolica" ("The Diabolic Duchess").

During the 1980s, Weber rose to celebrity level, when he acted in some of the Mexican sex comedies of the time, sometimes acting alongside comedians such as Rafael Inclan, Cesar Bono and others. Weber participated in around 140 films.

Weber was also an experienced dramatic actor, appearing in many Mexican telenovelas, such as "Hasta Que el Dinero nos Separe"("Til Money Do Us Part"), "Carita de Angel" ("Angel Face"), "Rebelde" and "Amores Verdaderos" ("True Loves")

== Personal life and death ==
Weber married four times. He had three daughters (Sara Maria, Sthepania and Vanessa) and one son (Pedro Jr.). During 2004, he suffered heart problems and was ordered to follow a strict diet to lose weight.

On 22 March 2016, Weber died in Mexico City at the age of 82, of heart and lung failure.

== See also ==
- List of Mexicans
