= Eduardo Manzano =

Mexican comedian, singer and actor (1938–2025)

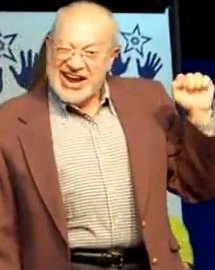
- Manzano at the premiere of the Nikté in 2009
- Born: Eduardo Manzano II; July 18, 1938; Mexico City, Mexico
- Died: December 5, 2025 (aged 87); Tlalpan, Mexico City, Mexico
- Other names: El Polivoz
- Occupations: Actor; comedian
- Years active: 1960–2025
- Spouse: Lourdes Martínez (div. 1980)
- Children: 3

Eduardo Manzano II (July 18, 1938 – December 5, 2025) was a Mexican comedian, singer and actor who was best known for being a part of the comedy duo "Los polivoces" and for his role as Arnoldo López in Una familia de diez (2007–2025).. Manzano died in Mexico City on December 5, 2025, at the age of 87.

== Selected filmography ==
- The Popcorn Chronicles (2014)
- One for the Road (2014)
- La hija de Moctezuma (2014)
- Marcianos vs. Mexicanos (2018) (voice role)
