= Daniela Luján =

Mexican recording artist, singer, actress

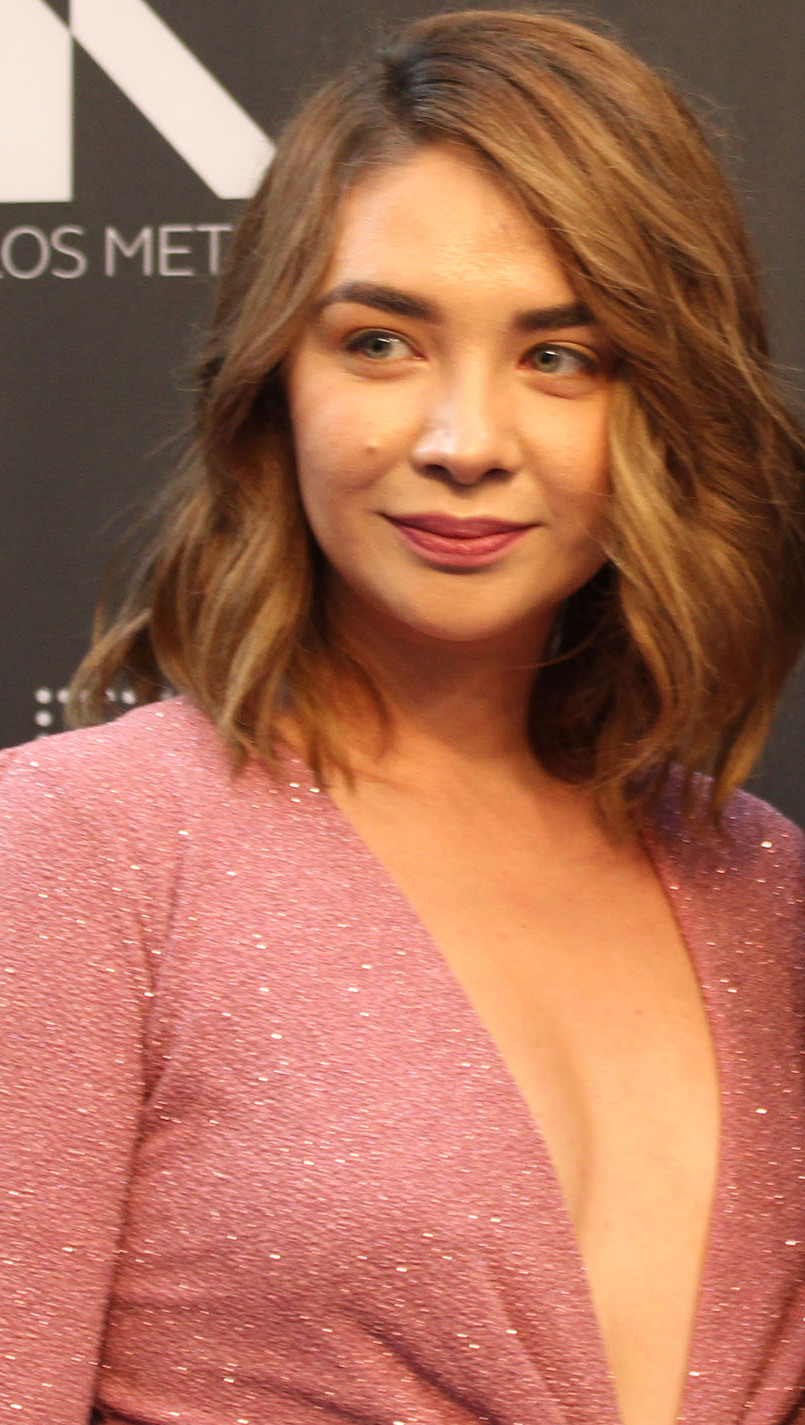
- Luján at Los Metro Awards in 2019

Background information
- Born: Daniela Barrios Rodríguez; 5 April 1988 (age 38); Mexico City, Mexico
- Genres: Latin, pop
- Occupations: Singer, actress
- Instrument: Vocals
- Years active: 1993–present

Daniela Luján (Spanish pronunciation: [daˈnjela luˈxan]; born Daniela Barrios Rodríguez, 5 April 1988) is a Mexican pop singer and actress. She rose to prominence with Una familia de diez, portraying Gabriela "Gaby" del Valle de López, and later appeared in Sortilegio as Lisette Albarrán and De que te quiero, te quiero as Karina Montiel roles that marked her artistic maturity. In her musical career, some critics have referred to her as the "Princess of Cumbia".

== Biography ==
Born on 5 April 1988, to Miguel Barrios Luján and Amalia Rodríguez Gómez, she is the youngest of three daughters. She started her artistic career at the age of five when she played María on the show Plaza Sésamo (the Mexican version of Sesame Street). She shot to fame in 1996 with the telenovela Luz Clarita, where Daniela played the main character, seven-year-old Luz Clarita. Daniela went on to star in other telenovelas like El diario de Daniela and Primer amor, a mil por hora. She has released two solo albums, one in 1999 titled Por un mundo mejor ("For a better world") and the other in 2001 titled Corazón.com ("Heart.com").

In 2004, she signed a contract with Menudo creator Edgardo Díaz, who is now in charge of her singing career.

In February 2017, she returned to Univision to become the captain of Pequeños Gigantes USA.

In 2024, Luján returned to telenovelas, starring in Papás por conveniencia. Later that year, she competed as "Huesito Peligroso" during the sixth season of ¿Quién es la máscara?, reaching the finale and finishing in third place.

== Filmography ==
=== Television ===
Year	Title	Role	Notes	Ref.
1993	Plaza Sésamo	María	Acting debut	
1995	La Dueña	Regina (young)	Special appearance	
1996–1997	Luz Clarita	Luz Clarita	Main role	
1998–1999	El diario de Daniela	Daniela 'Dani' Monroy	Main role	
2000	Primer amor, a mil por hora	Sabrina Luna Guerra	Supporting role	
2002	Cómplices Al Rescate	Mariana Cantú / Silvana del Valle Ontiveros	Main role; replaced Belinda Peregrín as of chapter 92	
2007; 2019-2023	Una familia de diez	Gaby del Valle	Main role	
2008	La rosa de Guadalupe	Angélica / Carolina / Aura	3 episodes	
2009	Sortilegio	Lisette Albarrán	Supporting role	
2013	De que te quiero, te quiero	Karina Montiel	Supporting role	
2011, 2014	Como dice el dicho	Ingrid / Claudia	2 episodes	
2017	Pequeños Gigantes USA	Herself	Captain	
2018	Por amar sin ley	Valeria Zamudio de Ocampo	Guest star	
2022–present	¿Tú crees?	Gaby del Valle	Main role	
2024	Papás por conveniencia	Clara Luz	Main role	
2024	¿Quién es la máscara?	Huesito Peligroso	Season 6 contestant	

=== Stage ===
- En El 2000, El Musical Del Nuevo Milenio ... Anahí/Renata (2019-2020)
- Cosas de Papá y Mamá ... Luisa (2018)
- La Princesa y el Ministro ... Princesa (2018)
- La Estética del Crimen ... Bárbara Lláñes (2018)
- La Tiendita de los Horrores ... Audrey Fulquard (2017)
- Verdad O Reto (2016)
- Carrie El Musical (2016)
- Una Familia de Diez (2014-2016)
- Cenicienta el musical (2010) Teatro Libanés
- Wicked (2010) ... Nessarose
- Camisa de fuerza (2009–2010)
- Cuentos para un día de sol (2009)
- Radio patito (2009)
- Vaselina (Mexican version of Grease) (2006) ... Licha/Sonia
- Centella, tierra de magia y estrellas (2005) ... Princesa Catite
- En dónde está el Mago de Oz
- Ariel, una historia de mar
- Caperucita Roja ... Caperucita Roja
- El sueño de una Flor

=== Film ===
- Sobre Tus Huellas - Carolina (2020)
- Charming - Lenore - (Voice - Latin Dub) (2019)
- Trolls - DJ Suki - (Voice - Latin Dub) (2016)
- Angelito Mio - María De Las Estrellas (1998)
- Entre Pancho Villa y Una Mujer Desnuda - Danny - (Participation) (1995)

=== Host ===
- Lifetime Fashion Studio (2018)
- ¡Qué Rayos! (2017-2018)
- Bailadísimo Junior (2017)
- TV de noche... desde la tarde (2012)
- Ritmo y Sabor (2004)
- Generación del Milenio (2002)
- Alebrije Kids (2002)

== Discography ==
=== Albums ===
Album information
Tanta Mujer
- Released: 12 April 2009
- Label: Fonarte Latino
Por Un Mundo Mejor
- Released: 27 August 1999
- Label: WEA Internacional
Corazón.com
- Released: 30 January 2001
- Label: WEA Internacional

=== Soundtracks ===
- 1997: La Luz más Clarita
- 1999: Angelito mío
- 1999: El diario de Daniela
- 2002: Cómplices al rescate, el gran final
