= María Fernanda García =

Mexican actress

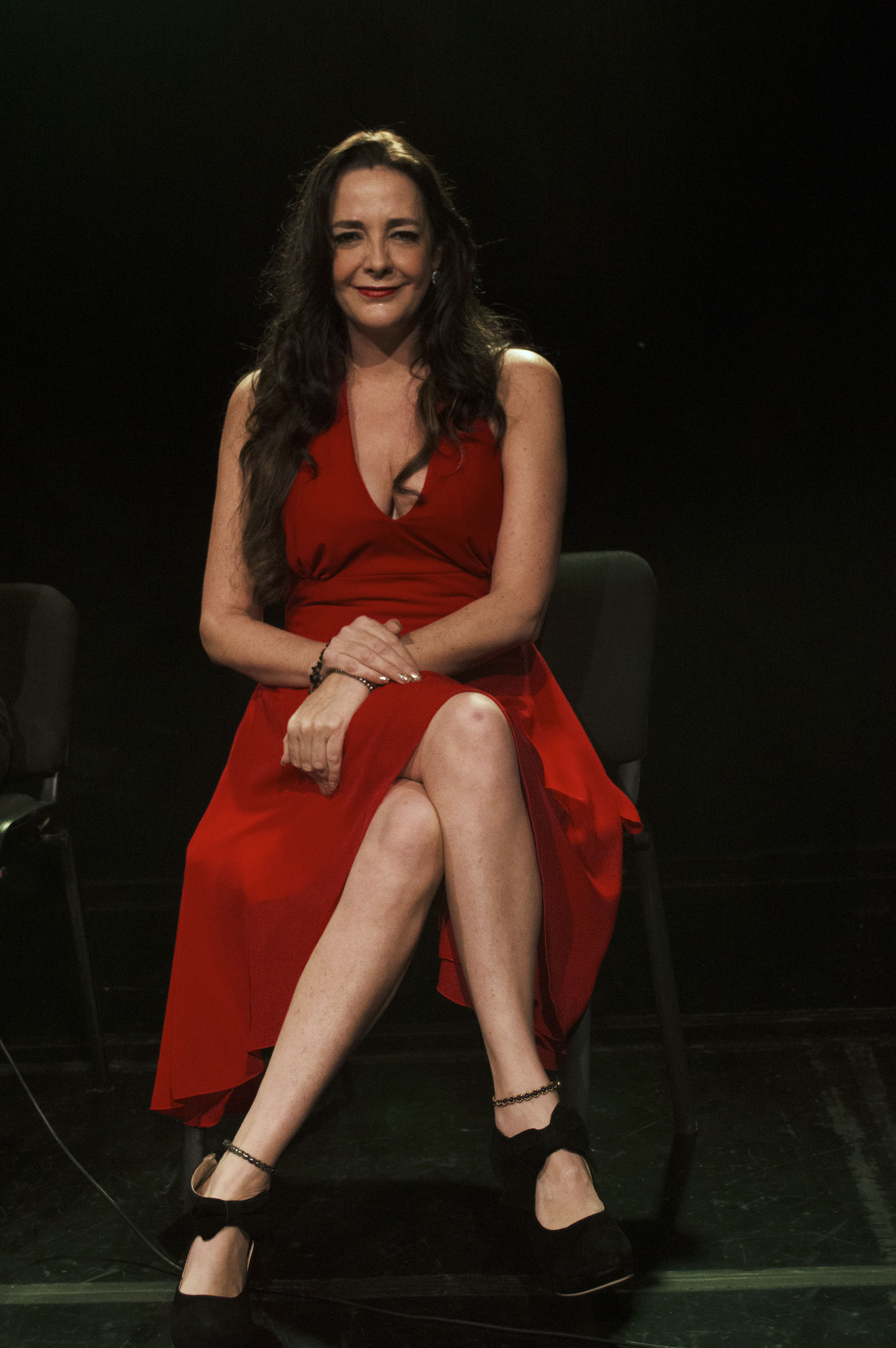
- García in 2016
- Born: 17 September 1967 (age 58); Mexico City, Mexico

María Fernanda García (born September 17, 1967) is a Mexican actress best known as "Licha" in Una familia de diez. She has also appeared in many telenovelas and won a Silver Ariel for "Best Actress in a Minor Role" for the film Bienvenido — Welcome (1995) at the 37th Ariel Awards.

== Filmography ==
- Doménica Montero (2025) - Diana Torres
- Como tú no hay 2 (2020) - Amelia Campos de Orozco "La Pastora"
- Rubí (2020) - Rosa Emilia Ortiz de la Fuente
- Sin tu mirada (2018) - Soledad
- La Piloto (2017) - Estella Lesmes Vda. de Cadena y Vda. de Calle
- Un refugio para el amor (2012)
- Ni contigo ni sin ti (2011) - Cristina Gardel Mondragón
- Verano de amor (2009) - Reyna Olmos
- Lola, Érase Una Vez (2007)
- Las dos caras de Ana (2006-2007) - Cristina Durán de Gardel
- Rebelde (2004-2006) - Alicia Salazar
- Rubí (2004) - Valeria
- Amarte es mi pecado (2004)
- Clase 406 (2002-2003) - Marlen Rivera
- Amigos x siempre (2000)
- Al norte del corazón (1997) - Beatriz
- Te dejaré de amar (1996) - Ligia
- Sueño de amor (1993) - Ligia Escalante
- Ángeles blancos (1990)
- Cuando llega el amor (1990)
- Luz y sombra (1989)
- Rosa salvaje (1987)
