= Ricardo Margaleff =

Mexican actor

- Born: Ricardo Margaleff García; January 1, 1977 (age 48); Mexico D.F., Mexico
- Occupations: Actor; writer; director; dancer; singer
- Years active: 1999–present
- Spouse: Annush Hanessian (m. 2012)
- Children: 1

Ricardo Margaleff (born Ricardo Margaleff García; January 1, 1977, in Mexico D.F., Mexico) is a Mexican actor known for his roles in Al diablo con los guapos, Una familia de diez, Llena de amor and Porque el amor manda.

== Personal life ==
On March 3, 2012, he married Annush Hanessian in an intimate ceremony accompanied by family and friends.

== Filmography ==
=== Television ===
| Year | Title | Role | Notes |
|---|---|---|---|
| 1999 | Rosalinda | | |
| 2002–2003 | Las vías del amor | Bruno | Recurring role |
| 2004 | Corazones al límite | Antonio Ramos | Recurring role |
| 2005 | Piel de otoño | Edson | Recurring role |
| 2005 | La energía de Sonric'slandia | Ricardo | |
| 2005 | Par de aces | | |
| 2006 | Mujer, casos de la vida real | | |
| 2006 | Energía Extrema | Ricardo | |
| 2006 | ¡Qué madre tan padre! | Animal | |
| 2007–2008 | Al diablo con los guapos | Ricardo "Rocky" Juárez "Morgan" | Main cast |
| 2007–present | Una familia de diez | Plutarco López González | Main cast |
| 2008–2009 | Un gancho al corazón | Arnoldo Klunder | Recurring role |
| 2008–2009 | Desde Gayola | Christopher | |
| 2010 | Hermanos y detectives | Floor Manager | |
| 2010–2011 | Llena de amor | Oliver Rosales / Graciela Agustina "Chelatina" Lozano | Main cast |
| 2011–2012 | Amorcito Corazón | Ramón "Moncho" | Main cast |
| 2012–2013 | Porque el amor manda | Julio Pando | Main cast |
| 2013 | STANDparados | Himself | |
| 2013–2014 | Qué pobres tan ricos | Jonathan Gómez | Recurring role |
| 2014–2015 | Hasta el fin del mundo | Pedro | Guest star |
| 2015 | Amores con trampa | Mauricio Gael Luna Velasco | Guest star |
| 2016 | Corazon que miente | Cristian Mena Souza | Main cast |
| 2017 | El bienamado | Juancho Lopez | Recurring role |
| 2018 | Tenías que ser tú | Brayan Pineda | Recurring role |
| 2020 | Te doy la vida | Agustin Preciado | Main cast |
| 2022 | ¿Tú crees? | Plutarco López González | Main role |
| 2022 | ¿Quién es la máscara? | Bunch | Season 4 |

=== Film ===
| Year | Title | Role |
|---|---|---|
| 2010 | Te presento a Laura | Police |

== Awards and nominations ==
=== TVyNovelas Awards ===
| Year | Category | Telenovela | Result |
|---|---|---|---|
| 2009 | Best Male Revelation | Al diablo con los guapos | Nominated |
