= Mariana Botas =

Mexican actress and singer

- Born: Mariana Botas Lima; January 29, 1990 (age 36)
- Occupations: Actress and singer
- Known for: Una familia de diez

Mariana Botas Limas (born January 29, 1990) is a Mexican actress and singer known for her role as "Martina López González" in Una familia de diez.

== Filmography ==
=== Television roles ===
Year	Title	Role	Notes
1998	Una luz en el camino	Luciana González de Alba Olvera	
1999	Serafín	Ana	
2000	El precio de tu amor	Mary Ríos	
2002	¡Vivan los niños!	Mary Paz Mazagatos	
2002–2005	Mujer, Casos de la Vida Real	Various roles	6 episodes
2007; 2019–present	Una familia de diez	Martina	
2011–2012	Esperanza del corazón	Britney Figueroa Guzmán	
2012–2017	Como dice el dicho	Carolina / Flor	2 episodes
2024	Top Chef VIP	Herself	Contestant; season 3
