= List of Vecinos episodes =

Vecinos is a Mexican sitcom that premiered on Las Estrellas on July 10, 2005. The series is created by Eugenio Derbez, based on the Spanish series Aquí no hay quien viva. The series stars César Bono, Eduardo España, Macaria, Polo Ortín, Mayrín Villanueva, Ana Bertha Espín, Moisés Suárez, Darío Ripoll, and Pablo Valentín. The series has been renewed for an eighteenth and nineteenth season. The eighteenth season premiered on February 23, 2025. The nineteenth season premiered on May 11, 2025.

As of April 26, 2026, 331 episodes of Vecinos have aired, currently in its twenty-first season.

== Series overview ==
Season	Episodes	Originally released	
Season	Episodes	First released	Last released
1	69	July 10, 2005	February 11, 2007
2	24	March 21, 2007	September 12, 2007
3	13	January 20, 2008	May 11, 2008
4	13	August 28, 2017	November 13, 2017
5	13	March 24, 2019	May 5, 2019
6	13	May 19, 2019	June 30, 2019
7	13	February 16, 2020	March 22, 2020
8	10	April 26, 2020	May 24, 2020
9	16	July 19, 2020	August 23, 2020
10	15	April 4, 2021	May 2, 2021
11	14	June 13, 2021	July 11, 2021
12	10	March 27, 2022	April 17, 2022
13	13	July 3, 2022	July 31, 2022
14	14	March 19, 2023	April 16, 2023
15	14	April 16, 2023	May 21, 2023
16	15	June 9, 2024	July 7, 2024
17	15	July 14, 2024	August 25, 2024
18	11	February 23, 2025	May 4, 2025
19	11	May 11, 2025	July 20, 2025
20	11	March 29, 2026	April 19, 2026
21	11	April 19, 2026	May 3, 2026

== Episodes ==
=== Season 1 (2005–07) ===
No. overall	No. in season	Title	Original release date
1	1	"Piloto"	July 10, 2005
2	2	"La pintura del edificio"	July 17, 2005
3	3	"La vampire bonita"	July 24, 2005
4	4	"Se acabó el agua"	July 31, 2005
5	5	"La luz interior"	August 7, 2005
6	6	"El luchador"	August 14, 2005
7	7	"La otra Magdalena"	August 21, 2005
8	8	"De millonario a mendigo"	August 28, 2005
9	9	"¿Y dónde esta el basurero?"	August 31, 2005
10	10	"La pareja de ventas"	September 7, 2005
11	11	"Mejor no celebremos México"	September 14, 2005
12	12	"Servicio de cable"	September 21, 2005
13	13	"América vs Chivas"	September 28, 2005
14	14	"Furia de cuatro ruedas"	October 5, 2005
15	15	"El ataque de las cucarachas"	October 12, 2005
16	16	"Con zapatos de tacón"	October 19, 2005
17	17	"Venta de garage"	October 26, 2005
18	18	"Noche de Halloween"	November 2, 2005
19	19	"Con el portón cerrado"	November 16, 2005
20	20	"El dilema del jacuzzi"	November 23, 2005
21	21	"Como vender un departamento"	November 30, 2005
22	22	"El nuevo administrador"	December 7, 2005
23	23	"El espíritu navideño"	December 14, 2005
24	24	"Aguas turbias"	January 18, 2006
25	25	"Fuga de gas"	January 24, 2006
26	26	"Mercado sobre ruedas"	January 31, 2006
27	27	"Empieza la fiesta"	February 7, 2006
28	28	"El día del amor y la amistad"	February 14, 2006
29	29	"Rento mi departamento"	February 21, 2006
30	30	"Con el apagón"	February 28, 2006
31	31	"La toalla del mojado"	March 7, 2006
32	32	"Primer amor... Benito a mil por hora"	March 14, 2006
33	33	"Batidora, computadora y secadora"	March 21, 2006
34	34	"Ascendiendo a Arturo"	March 28, 2006
35	35	"¿Quién es el padre?"	April 4, 2006
36	36	"Martes vecinal"	April 22, 2006
37	37	"Mis pobres diablillos"	April 29, 2006
38	38	"Competencia de Hot Dogs"	May 6, 2006
39	39	"Viaje a Canada (Parte 1)"	May 20, 2006
40	40	"Viaje a Canada (Parte 2)"	May 27, 2006
41	41	"Cursos sin superación"	June 3, 2006
42	42	"Los López en Canada"	June 10, 2006
43	43	"Verdades ocultas"	June 17, 2006
44	44	"Embargo a los López"	June 24, 2006
45	45	"Silvia en Canada"	July 1, 2006
46	46	"Aviso de desalojo"	July 22, 2006
47	47	"La jaula de las vecinas"	July 29, 2006
48	48	"Un tatuaje para Alejandra"	August 5, 2006
49	49	"Tesoro perdido"	August 12, 2006
50	50	"Cartas que asustan"	August 19, 2006
51	51	"Sin ton ni Silvia"	August 26, 2006
52	52	"Truco o trato"	September 2, 2006
53	53	"Otro robo"	September 9, 2006
54	54	"Buscando al portero"	September 16, 2006
55	55	"Un intruso en la familia"	September 23, 2006
56	56	"El nuevo conserje"	October 7, 2006
57	57	"Volver al futuro"	October 14, 2006
58	58	"Intercambio escolar"	October 21, 2006
59	59	"Fantasmas del más acá"	October 28, 2006
60	60	"Video descompuesta"	November 4, 2006
61	61	"Un nuevo casting"	November 11, 2006
62	62	"Sesión espiritista"	November 18, 2006
63	63	"Reta de Ping Pong"	November 25, 2006
64	64	"Maratón del barrio"	December 10, 2006
65	65	"Romance de dos"	January 14, 2007
66	66	"Cuando un esposo se va"	January 21, 2007
67	67	"Vecinos en Ixtapa"	January 28, 2007
68	68	"Mira quién muerde"	February 4, 2007
69	69	"La gran oportunidad"	February 11, 2007

=== Season 2 (2007) ===
No. overall	No. in season	Title	Original release date
70	1	"Re-Pintando la vecindad"	March 21, 2007
71	2	"Celosa por un sofá"	March 28, 2007
72	3	"Aumento de renta"	April 4, 2007
73	4	"Presidente de la Manzana"	April 11, 2007
74	5	"¿Dónde está Rambo?"	April 18, 2007
75	6	"El amor de Magda"	April 25, 2007
76	7	"Solterona desesperada"	May 2, 2007
77	8	"Seguridad vecinal"	May 16, 2007
78	9	"Escuela de actuación"	May 23, 2007
79	10	"Reconocimiento especial"	May 30, 2007
80	11	"Algodones de azúcar"	June 6, 2007
81	12	"Destilando celos"	June 13, 2007
82	13	"Cursos de verano"	June 20, 2007
83	14	"Lecciones de piano"	July 4, 2007
84	15	"Robo de gas"	July 11, 2007
85	16	"Grandes intereses"	July 18, 2007
86	17	"Bomba de agua"	July 25, 2007
87	18	"Perico parlante"	August 1, 2007
88	19	"Niñera a prueba de perros"	August 8, 2007
89	20	"El concurso del millón"	August 15, 2007
90	21	"Problemas de tubería"	August 22, 2007
91	22	"La última conquista"	August 29, 2007
92	23	"La boda de Silvia (Parte 1)"	September 5, 2007
93	24	"La boda de Silvia (Parte 2)"	September 12, 2007

=== Season 3 (2008) ===
No. overall	No. in season	Title	Original release date
94	1	"El regreso"	January 20, 2008
Magda and Alejandra do not speak because of a misunderstanding that occurred due to a supposed pregnancy. The neighbors suffer from robberies because the gate is broken and obviously no one cooperates to fix it.
95	2	"Una nueva administradora"	January 27, 2008
Luis calls a meeting, since he can not be the building administrator anymore. Magda is running for the position and nobody knows what the fate of the administration's money will be with the new person in charge.
96	3	"El santo niño milagroso"	February 3, 2008
A couple of religious women offers to the neighbors, the Miraculous Child, but they refuse to take care of him. Upon learning that a neighbor wins the lottery thanks to the Miracle Child, everyone will look for a way to have him.
97	4	"La llegada de la Yeyis"	February 10, 2008
Magda speaks with Margarita, who impresses by telling her that she lives as a rich woman.
98	5	"Se busca niñera"	February 17, 2008
Luis decides to hire a nanny to take care of Luisito to what Pedro advises that she be a beautiful nanny. The hired nanny has a gossip reputation, and when she sees them together in bed, she assumes they are gay.
99	6	"Vendedora de Toppers"	February 24, 2008
The Rivers family is in crisis so they decide to sell toppers and neighbors are called by Lorena to buy their products, but everyone will resist.
100	7	"Despedida de soltera"	March 2, 2008
Silvia's cousin has her bachelorette party and Silvia realizes that her cousin's fiancé is an ex-boyfriend. Germán helps to get things to acclimate, although they are not exactly liked by Silvia.
101	8	"Frankie Superestrella"	March 9, 2008
A filmmaker arrives to film in the building, so Germán makes a meeting to ask permission. Some neighbors are hired as extras and Frankie insists the director on participating. Silvia thinks she has found a boyfriend, but he likes another person.
102	9	"Enchúlame mi auto"	March 16, 2008
Luis' car breaks down and Germán recommends a mechanic, who puts his business on the sidewalk and Magda gets upset. Luis will ask the mechanic to leave, but when he refuses, he will want to face him.
103	10	"La nueva hija de los Rivers"	March 30, 2008
Benito leaves to study abroad and Patricia arrives at the Rivers home as part of the student exchange program. The director speaks well of the girl to get rid of her, as she is a danger. Germán takes advantage and pays Patricia to do evil things.
105	11	"Superación personal"	April 6, 2008
A car crashes into the building and Frankie says he has evidence of the crash. The guilty party will offer money in exchange for the video footage.
105	12	"Extreme Makeover: Edición vecindad"	April 13, 2008
Magda will have to remodel the building, since she will receive Margarita's visit and Pedro goes to work in Neto's store.
106	13	"El nuevo vecino"	May 11, 2008
Arturo López asks for a loan. By confusing him, he can withdraw one hundred thousand pesos. Pao and Ro return for their son, but Luis refuses to give him back, so they will want the child to choose whom to go with.

=== Season 4 (2017) ===
No. overall	No. in season	Title	Original release date	Blim release date
107	1	"El grupo de Whats"	August 28, 2017	August 28, 2017
The neighbors decide to create a group chat in WhatsApp for strictly neighborhood issues, and as is often the case, the group serves everything, except for that.
108	2	"El gas"	September 4, 2017	August 28, 2017
The neighbors do not pay the gas fee, and before the refusal of all, Luis decides to put his own tank stationary on the roof.
109	3	"Franeleros"	September 11, 2017	August 28, 2017
A plague of franeleros arrives at the building and the problems do not wait. Whoever wants to park their car on the street will have to pay the fee.
110	4	"El reciclaje"	September 18, 2017	August 28, 2017
The neighbors receive an invitation from the delegation to separate the garbage in two categories, organic and inorganic, Germán is in charge of this mission.
111	5	"La fiesta de Morris"	September 25, 2017	August 28, 2017
Magdalena creates a Facebook account where she shows off what she does not; she even broadcasts live a public invitation for her grandson Morris's party.
112	6	"La chica del Feis"	October 2, 2017	August 28, 2017
Pedro is dedicated to flirting on Facebook and, to Luis' astonishment, meets a beautiful girl. Luis, curious, decides to apply the same technique to find the love of his life.
113	7	"Como en casa"	October 9, 2017	August 28, 2017
Silvia, desperate to meet men, rents a room in her apartment by means of an app. A man arrives to rent the room and she falls in love, but also the ex-girlfriend appears.
114	8	"El simulacro"	December 26, 2018	August 28, 2017
The neighbors react like crazy when an earthquake occurs and request the delegation an evacuation course. They want to be prepared for an event like this, what they do not imagine is that another earthquake is near and will put them to the test.
115	9	"El origen"	October 16, 2017	August 28, 2017
Morris is in the stage of doubts and asks his parents how to conquer the love of his life. Alejandra and Rocko decide to tell him a love story: the story of how they met. Guest stars: Vanessa Mateo as Silvia's friend, Jorge Lemus as Manager
116	10	"El Wifi"	October 23, 2017	August 28, 2017
Silvia installs high-speed internet in her apartment, however her connection is very slow. What she doesn’t know is that her neighbors know the password and they are all connect to her network.
117	11	"El método"	October 30, 2017	August 28, 2017
Lorena is tired of Frankie not getting a job and he comes up with a great idea, to set up an acting academy based on the Rivers Method.
118	12	"El click"	November 6, 2017	August 28, 2017
In the building there is a rumor that Arturo and Lorena are dating. When Magdalena suspects that Arturo has a lover, she begins to fight for him.
119	13	"La separación"	November 13, 2017	August 28, 2017
Frankie and Lorena go through a strong marriage crisis. Everything points to the Rivers separating. The neighbors help with reconciliation but all are failed attempts, because Frankie has left his home.

=== Season 5 (2019) ===
No. overall	No. in season	Title	Original release date	Mexico viewers (millions)
120	1	"Benito regresa"	March 24, 2019	2.9
Lalo invites Silvia on a date, she begins to plan her future. After refusing to pay the maintenance fee, The López Pérez services are cut off, and in an attempt to get electricity, they leave half of the neighborhood without power. Benito returns to the neighborhood. Guest stars: Sherlyn as Ana Teresa Rubi Mercedes, Lenny de la Rosa as Lalo, Gina Holguín as Cris
121	2	"Por la jefatura de manzana"	March 24, 2019	2.9
Silvia is running to be the representative of the neighborhood and will compete with Arturo for the candidacy, because Magdalena is interested in the salary. Alejandra and Rocko are going to a rock concert, but they discover that it is not their thing anymore.
122	3	"Hoy juega México"	March 31, 2019	2.3
Aunt Oli visits her niece Silvia and will not leave until she gets her a partner. Germán and the neighbors watch a soccer game at Silvia's apartment without telling her and end up breaking many of her things. Guest stars: Maribel Guardia as Oli, Gina Holguín as Cris
123	4	"Reunión de ex alumnos"	March 31, 2019	2.3
Silvia holds a class reunion in her apartment, and so that no one knows that she is still single, she will ask Pedro to pretend to be her fiancé. Everything is going well until she learns that Edgar is also single and will seek to conquer him. Guest stars: Marcelo Córdoba as Edgar, Gina Holguín as Cris
124	5	"Jorjáis roomie"	April 7, 2019	2.1
In the absence of Luis, Pedro decides to rent a room in the apartment to Jorjáis, causing some problems. Lorena has a secret date, Silvia and Magdalena try to find out who it is.
125	6	"La telenovela"	April 7, 2019	2.1
The production of a telenovela chooses the building to be the location of a poor neighborhood and by accident, Jorjáis turns out to be a great actor. Meanwhile, Lorena will listen to Benito and decide to give love another chance. Guest stars: Renata Notni as Guadalupe, Jorge Aravena as Jorge Menéndez, Gina Holguín as Cris, Frank Medellín as Assistant
126	7	"Mi vieja"	April 14, 2019	2.6
Luis tells Pedro that his woman will go to the apartment and asks him to pay attention to her. Pedro, thinking that it’s Pedro’s girlfriend, will try to impress her, but, it is actually Jovita, Luis's mother. Someone is leaving garbage bags in front of the building and the neighbors decide to put an altar so that the person can stop throwing garbage.
127	8	"Nuevo inquilino"	April 21, 2019	2.3
Roberto arrives to rent one of the apartments of the building and Silvia will not waste time trying to conquer him, but he will have to move very soon to Paris, just when he has met the love of his life. Germán wants to get a tattoo. Guest star: Juan Ángel Esparza as Roberto
128	9	"La venganza de la maestra"	April 21, 2019	2.3
Alejandra discovers Morris' teacher is Belén, a classmate she used to bother and who now takes her revenge with her son. Silvia hires Chelo to help with the house chores and she brings men into the apartment. Guest stars: Gabriela Zamora as Chelo, Ariana Figueroa as Bélen Islas, Gina Holguín as Cris, Héctor Kotsifakis as René González 'Tlaloc'
129	10	"Arturo amuleto"	April 28, 2019	2.0
In the soccer team they discover that Arturo brings them luck and they want him to get to the final. Silvia has humidity in her apartment and it's because of a leak in the Lopez Perez's bathroom.
130	11	"La bomba de agua"	April 28, 2019	2.0
The neighbors order Germán to repair the water pump but he leaves it worse. Jovita substitutes Pedro's snacks for healthier food.
131	12	"Echando cohetes"	May 5, 2019	2.5
It is the town party and in the middle of the night, the fireworks wake Silvia from her ideal dream, while Arturo is frightened and Magda gets angry. They ask Germán to go to the fair to stop the fireworks. Rocko complains that Alejandra is not affectionate with him Guest stars: Arturo Carmona as Silvia’s boyfriend, Pocholo as Firework salesman
132	13	"El desalojo"	May 5, 2019	2.5
Germán decides to leave the building, because the neighbors want to kick him out and he discovers that Virginia cheats on him. After years without paying rent, the López Pérez are notified that they will be evicted. Director Cuarón is interested in a script by Frankie. Silvia begins receiving gifts from a secret admirer. Guest star: Gina Holguín as Cris

=== Season 6 (2019) ===
No. overall	No. in season	Title	Original release date	Mexico viewers (millions)
133	1	"Germán, el regreso"	May 19, 2019	2.6
Luis asks Silvia to be his girlfriend, Pedro convinces him to be a better person and thus get her love. The López Pérez return to live in the building and Germán has a surprise for everyone.
134	2	"La primera cita"	May 19, 2019	2.6
Silvia agrees to go out with Luis and they go to a luxurious restaurant where the manager is Silvia's ex-boyfriend. Magdalena is the new head of security and, due to the robberies in the building, will install cameras with the help of Germán. Guest star: Gabriel Soto as Pietro Massoni
135	3	"El cumpleaños de Silvia"	May 26, 2019	1.9
Silvia is celebrating her birthday and Luis plans to give her a surprise gift. The López Pérez do not find Morris anywhere and suspect that he has left the house.
136	4	"Luis pobretón"	May 26, 2019	1.9
Luis is unemployed and has a date with Silvia. She and the neighbors believe that Luis is broke. Germán picks up a stray dog and puts it up for adoption.
137	5	"La novia de Pedro"	June 2, 2019	2.4
Pedro asks out Cris, Silvia's best friend, and organizes a double date with Luis and Silvia. Germán is the chosen one to solve the road problem outside the building.
138	6	"En una relación"	June 2, 2019	2.4
After a time of leaving together, Luis asks Silvia what they are and wants her to decide at once. The mayor's office installs LED lamps in the street lighting and does not let the neighbors sleep.
139	7	"Beso fallido"	June 2, 2019	2.4
Luis invites Silvia to watch movies at his apartment and Pedro will fight for the television. Arturo receives a bonus and uses the money to play poker with Germán, Benito and Jorjáis.
140	8	"Las pantuflas de Luis"	June 9, 2019	2.0
Luis and Pedro make a bet to know if it’s pronounced 'pantuflas' or 'pantunflas' and they ask all the neighbors. Lorena suspects that Benito is upset about her new friend.
141	9	"Mi segundo aire"	June 16, 2019	1.8
Lorena decides to change her look, because she feels rejuvenated. Alejandra organizes a party in her apartment and Lorena will be the soul of the party. Germán is dedicated to fighting a plague of cockroaches.
142	10	"Número equivocado"	June 16, 2019	1.8
Someone has gratified the facade of the building. And to remove it, Germán will change the number of the entrance of the building, causing Luis' package to not arrive and neither the painter that Lorena waits for.
143	11	"La tarjeta de la tercera edad"	June 16, 2019	1.8
Magdalena makes fraud with help cards for the elderly, making her whole family pretend to be older adults. Benito causes discomfort among the neighbors with his new car.
144	12	"Cásate conmigo"	June 30, 2019	2.3
Silvia and Luis are fighting and decide to make each other jealous by dating other people. Germán repairs Lorena’s table. Luis asks Silvia for marriage.
145	13	"La Boda"	June 30, 2019	2.3
Luis and Silvia announce their wedding and the neighbors will convince them to marry in the building and help with the preparations.

=== Season 7 (2020) ===
No. overall	No. in season	Title	Original release date	Mexico viewers (millions)
146	1	"Vecinos ruidosos"	February 16, 2020	2.9
The neighbors complain about the noises coming from Luis and Silvia's apartment, Germán tries to repair Lorena's pipe and the López Pérez suffer from itching.
147	2	"El regreso de Frankie"	February 16, 2020	2.9
Frankie Rivers wants to return home, Doña Magda becomes administrator of the neighborhood WhatsApp group chat and she is assigned with a cell phone plan that she begins to abuse.
148	3	"La llegada de Vanesa"	February 23, 2020	2.9
Vanesa returns to the building to visit the neighbors and catch up. Benito invites his girlfriend to “watch movies” in the apartment, upon learning that his parents will be going out.
149	4	"La cocina de Silvita"	February 23, 2020	2.9
Silvia decides to learn to cook and prepare food for Luis, but Luis does not know how to tell her that she does not cook well. Frankie decides to exchange his typewriter for a computer.
150	5	"El hojalatero"	February 23, 2020	2.9
A traveling tinsmith comes to work in front of the building, causing everyone's annoyance. Cris convinces Pedro to clean up for the first time.Germán gives Vanesa the things that his grandfather, Don Roque Balboa, left him. Frankie has a new admirer.
151	6	"Las cosas de Don Roque"	March 1, 2020	2.0
Germán gives Vanesa the things that her grandfather, Don Roque Balboa, left her. Frankie has a new admirer.
152	7	"El tamalero"	March 1, 2020	2.0
Luis complains about the noise the tamalero makes with his horn and inadvertently causes him to lose his job. Alejandra has a personal conflict when people start referring to her as "ma'am".
153	8	"Los paramédicos"	March 1, 2020	2.0
Morris lies on a school assignment saying that his parents are paramedics and the teacher invites them to teach a course. Frankie learns that the new neighbors have a casting office.
154	9	"La tanda"	March 8, 2020	2.8
Lorena organizes a loan club with the neighbors and Magdalena wants to take away her clients by organizing another club. Germán must repair the intercom.
155	10	"Los ex"	March 8, 2020	2.8
Luis becomes uncomfortable with Silvia when he finds out that she is texting with an ex-boyfriend, while he will receive an unexpected visit from an ex-girlfriend. Jorjáis is about to become an artist and set up an exhibition.
156	11	"El cumpleaños de Germán"	March 8, 2020	2.8
It is Germán's birthday and as nobody congratulates him, he thinks that they are preparing a surprise party for him. Lorena and Frankie convince Benito to attend a casting.
157	12	"La amiga incómoda"	March 15, 2020	2.3
Silvia receives a visit from a friend who, due to emotional problems, stays to sleep in her apartment. The neighbors have a proposal to put advertising on the building in exchange for a payment.
158	13	"El nuevo reglamento"	March 22, 2020	2.6
Luis proposes to update the neighborhood regulations and he himself is in charge of compiling the proposals. Benito has a new casting. Jorjáis will tell his life story.

=== Season 8 (2020) ===
No. overall	No. in season	Title	Original release date	Mexico viewers (millions)
159	1	"La historia de Jorjais"	April 26, 2020	2.2
Jorjais will tell his life story. Germán is the most interested in knowing his story. Benito organizes a party in his apartment.
160	2	"La cocina económica"	April 26, 2020	2.2
Lorena puts an affordable kitchen in her apartment. The neighbors complain about the smell of the food. The López Pérez steal a chair owned by Jorjais.
161	3	"Una pareja real"	May 3, 2020	2.1
Silvia is offended with Luis when in a couples game, he tells her what he doesn't like about her. Germán confuses the correspondence of the neighbors and causes chaos.
162	4	"La Bocinota"	May 3, 2020	2.1
A repair shop opens next door to the building. The inauguration causes annoyance among the neighbors. Rocko and Arturo take the opportunity to get a job at the shop. Guest star: Enoc Leaño as Eusebio Domínguez
163	5	"Bienvenido doctor"	May 10, 2020	1.8
A new neighbor comes to the building, apparently he is a doctor and Magdalena harasses him for a free prescription. Pedro and Cris go on a diet. Guest star: Darío T. Pie as Rafael Rivas
164	6	"Una de terror"	May 10, 2020	1.8
Pedro and Cris watch a horror movie, while Luis tries to work. Doña Magda takes her flower pots out into the hallway, violating neighborhood regulations and causing others to do the same.
165	7	"Matrimonio perfecto"	May 17, 2020	1.9
Silvia and Luis are visited by friends who appear to be the perfect marriage, testing their marriage. Germán has to deal with mischievous children who litter the courtyard.
166	8	"Ruf Garden"	May 17, 2020	1.9
Magdalena wants a roof garden and will use the funds from the building to build it and organize a party. Frankie becomes a YouTuber.
167	9	"Mega corte de agua"	May 24, 2020	1.6
The mayor's office announces a water cut-off that will last one week and the neighbors will end the supply of the building. The López Pérez family installs air conditioning in their apartment.
168	10	"Los Bloopers"	May 24, 2020	1.6
A special episode with bloopers and outtakes of the season.

=== Season 9 (2020) ===
No. overall	No. in season	Title	Original release date	Mexico viewers (millions)
169	1	"Las palomas"	July 19, 2020	2.5
A plague of pigeons arrives at the building and the neighbors fight them off with help from Germán. The López Pérez family runs out of coffee and Arturo must get it from the neighbors.
170	2	"Quédate en casa"	July 19, 2020	2.5
The neighbors organize to fight the Coronavirus pandemic. The situation is complicated when someone steals the antibacterial gel from the entrance.
171	3	"El huerto de Vanesa"	July 26, 2020	2.6
Vanesa puts a garden in the building, but discovers that someone is stealing her vegetables. Rocko has an intense toothache and doesn't want to go to the dentist.
172	4	"El colchón viejo"	July 26, 2020	2.6
Magdalena sells her old mattress to Jorjais, unaware that Arturo keeps his savings there. Cris asks Pedro to formalize their relationship.
173	5	"Los XV años"	July 26, 2020	2.6
It is Germán's 15th anniversary working in the building and is celebrated with a party. Frankie Rivers has a creative crisis.
174	6	"La gran fuga"	August 2, 2020	2.2
There is a leak in one of the gas tanks and Germán is in charge of repairing it. Benito has a casting for the Rocky movie.
175	7	"Arturo sastre"	August 2, 2020	2.2
Arturo takes out his old sewing machine to dedicate himself to sewing. Vanesa brings a rooster with Alzheimer's into the building that crows all day.
176	8	"El trabajo de Alejandra"	August 2, 2020	2.2
The López Pérez need an extra income of money and Alejandra goes out to look for a job. Benito meets a friend from the castings and invites him to the apartment.
177	9	"La gotera"	August 9, 2020	2.1
A leak in the López Pérez bathroom causes leaks in Pedro's apartment. Benito and Liz go to a casting for the musical Vaselina.
178	10	"Mi amiga Virginia"	August 9, 2020	2.1
Virginia is left homeless and jobless. Germán decides to give her asylum and she becomes everyone's best friend. Luis signs up for Zumba classes online.
179	11	"Fiesta de casados"	August 9, 2020	2.1
Luis feels lonely and Silvia encourages him to organize a meeting in the apartment. Luis invites the married men in the building. Vanesa entrusts Germán with a little bird with behavior problems.
180	12	"El San Antonio"	August 16, 2020	2.3
Germán and Jorjáis accidentally break Silvia's San Antonio statue. The López Pérez family complain about the high water consumption in the building.
181	13	"No se peleen"	August 16, 2020	2.3
Germán and Jorjáis fight over Borre's last taco and they stop talking. Vanesa leaves Benito in charge of a cat.
182	14	"El álbum"	August 16, 2020	2.3
Germán and Jorjáis find a photo album in the garbage and through it they remember the best of the worst of the neighbors.
183	15	"Germán por un día"	August 23, 2020	2.0
Germán gets sick and the neighbors decide to help him with the building work. Magdalena invents a trip to Paris to show off to her friend.
184	16	"Embarazo"	August 23, 2020	2.0
Germán has the task of planting small trees that the mayor's office has given them. Someone in the building is pregnant.

=== Season 10 (2021) ===
No. overall	No. in season	Title	Original release date	Mexico viewers (millions)
185	1	"Voy a ser papá"	April 4, 2021	2.2
Luis receives the news that he and Silvia will be parents and prepares everything for the arrival of his heir. The López Pérez family begins to live their rich lives. Pedro suspects that Cris could be pregnant.
186	2	"La casa de Las Lomas"	April 4, 2021	2.2
The López Pérezes hire a real estate agent to buy their home in Las Lomas. Silvia and Luis cannot decide on the baby's name.
187	3	"Perdimos todo"	April 4, 2021	2.2
The López Pérez family will move into their mansion in Las Lomas, but investing their money in the stock market puts their plans at risk. Luis becomes intense and takes Silvia's pregnancy very seriously.
188	4	"Luisito corazón de plomo"	April 11, 2021	2.4
The López Pérez family lost their money on the stock market and are now trying to get Luis's apartment back. Frankie has lost the desire to write and Lorena returns home.
189	5	"Muñeco vudú"	April 11, 2021	2.4
Germán and Jorjáis find a voodoo doll, they assume that someone is doing witchcraft in the building. Pedro, Cris and Vanesa have problems with the WiFi in their apartment.
190	6	"Síntomas empatéticos de Luis"	April 11, 2021	2.4
Luis discovers that it is he, and not Silvia, who has symptoms of pregnancy. The neighbors find wanted posters on the street for Jorjáis.
191	7	"La hija de Jorjáis"	April 18, 2021	1.8
A young beggar woman arrives at the building, she is the daughter of Jorjáis and she is looking for him. Vanesa meets a young baseball player with whom she falls in love.
192	8	"Niño o niña"	April 18, 2021	1.8
Luis organizes a surprise gender reveal party. Benito feels that he may lose Liz and wants to give her an engagement ring.
193	9	"Conserje aprendiz"	April 18, 2021	1.8
Germán teaches a friend the art of janitorial services. Frankie gets a casting call for Lorena, and with Benito's help, prepares her for the role.
194	10	"La Chapa"	April 25, 2021	1.8
Luis breaks the lock of the gate, leaving him and Silvia outside and the rest of the neighbors inside. While the lock waits to be repaired, the neighbors use Luis as an errand boy.
195	11	"Apolonio y la víbora"	April 25, 2021	1.8
Vanesa brings a snake to the building and it escapes. Now she has to get it back without the neighbors knowing. Silvia and Luis take a psychoprophylactic course with Luis's ex.
196	12	"El Perfume"	April 25, 2021	1.8
Silvia suffers from morning sickness and is very sensitive to smells. Frankie prepares Benito for the casting of The Addams Family.
197	13	"Los Tocatimbres"	May 2, 2021	2.1
Germán believes that the building's doorbells are haunted, as someone is constantly ringing them. Luis tries to put some shelves in the baby's room.
198	14	"Arturo más pordiosero"	May 2, 2021	2.1
The López Pérezes pose as beggars to receive charity. Pedro has not taken a shower for several days and Cris demands that he do so.
199	15	"El Parto"	May 2, 2021	2.1
Silvia begins labor in the apartment. There is no time to get to the hospital. Luis, with the help of the neighbors, will receive the baby.

=== Season 11 (2021) ===
No. overall	No. in season	Title	Original release date	Mexico viewers (millions)
200	1	"Vecinos consejeros"	June 13, 2021	2.3
Silvia and Luis's son won't stop crying, they don’t know what to do. The neighbors advise Silvia and Luis on how to take care of the baby. Germán improvises a gym in the lobby.
201	2	"Mucha luz"	June 13, 2021	2.3
There are power failures in some of the apartments and Luis has to go to work with the López Pérez family. Germán prepares for his online high school admissions exam.
202	3	"Ya salió barriga"	June 13, 2021	2.3
A new tenant arrives at the building, his name is: Hipólito Menchaca, and he bears a great resemblance to the famous actor Édgar Vivar. The neighbors want to look good to him.
203	4	"La Jefa del Rocko"	June 20, 2021	1.7
Rocko's mom comes to meet her grandson Morris and intends to take him to live with her. Liz becomes Benito's manager and gets him a role in a movie.
204	5	"Conserjerito inglés"	June 20, 2021	1.7
Germán and the others take English classes online with Silvia. When Silvia fails Germán, he discovers a way to get even. Rocko has hearing problems.
205	6	"La Toalla del Mojado 2"	June 20, 2021	1.7
Frankie receives an unexpected visit, the famous actress: Lyn May, who inspires him to make the movie "La Toalla del Mojado 2". Pedro takes care of Luisito Jr. so that Luis can rest.
206	7	"La Veterinaria de Vanesa"	June 27, 2021	1.9
Vanesa fulfills the dream of having her own vet clinic and with the help of her boyfriend Fabián, rents the property next to the building. The López Pérez family buy a washing machine and put it in front of Luis's apartment.
207	8	"Qué escándalo"	June 27, 2021	1.9
Morris learns to play the drums and the neighbors complain about the noise. Silvia and Luis discover that this noise lulls the baby to sleep. Pedro is worried because he does not remember the date of Cris's birthday.
208	9	"Arturo Influencer"	June 27, 2021	1.9
Arturo becomes a famous TikTok influencer and Paco de Miguel seeks him out for a collaboration. Cris receives a visit from her sister Esmeralda, and Pedro feels displaced.
209	10	"El novio de Virginia"	July 4, 2021	1.8
Virginia has a boyfriend and introduces him to Germán, making him jealous. Silvia has to attend a diploma course and leave home for a few days, but first she hires a babysitter.
210	11	"Bebé a bordo"	July 4, 2021	1.8
Silvia is still absent and Luis has to leave for the office, leaving Luisito Jr. with Pedro, who loses the baby.
211	12	"Atorón en la escalera"	July 4, 2021	1.8
The Lopez Perez's carry an old mattress down the stairs and run into Luis carrying a new crib for Luisito Jr. Benito forgot his anniversary with Liz and Liz asks him to look for a job.
212	13	"Primera palabra"	July 11, 2021	2.5
Silvia returns home and the baby says his first word: the name of Luis' ex-girlfriend. Benito and Liz ask Pedro for love advice.
213	14	"El Bautizo"	July 11, 2021	2.5
Silvia and Luis organize the baptism of Luisito Jr. Benito and Liz announce that they want to move in together. The neighbors receive unexpected news and may have to vacate the building.

=== Season 12 (2022) ===
No. overall	No. in season	Title	Original release date	Mexico viewers (millions)
214	1	"No se vende"	March 27, 2022	2.3
The neighbors will be evicted from the building, as the owner passed away and her two daughters are disputing it.
215	2	"La llegada de Alejandra"	March 27, 2022	2.3
Alejandra returns and Rocko believes it's to have another child. Benito gets a role at an important casting.
216	3	"Brigada de vacunación"	March 27, 2022	2.3
The neighbors receive the first dose of the coronavirus vaccine and reveal their fears.
217	4	"Música para tus oídos"	April 3, 2022	1.6
Hipólito decides to play his music on the sidewalk and Jorjais sees him as a threat.
218	5	"La cisterna y El Charro negro"	April 3, 2022	1.6
The neighbors hear the rumor that Don Roque hid the treasure of the black Charro in the water tank.
219	6	"El Capitán Raquetas"	April 3, 2022	1.6
Luis asks Pedro and Jorjáis for help to increase the sale of his fly swatters.
220	7	"Guerra de albóndigas"	April 10, 2022	1.9
Lorena and Liz challenge each other to see who can make the best meatball enchipotladas. Alejandra's mother-in-law wants to meet her.
221	8	"El cumpleaños de Magdalena"	April 10, 2022	1.9
The neighbors prepare a surprise party for Doña Magda. Liz and Lorena participate in a casting for Snow White.
222	9	"La visita"	April 10, 2022	1.9
Hipólito receives a visit from his twin brother. Jorjáis starts a business as a cab driver and food delivery man.
223	10	"Arturo oficinista"	April 17, 2022	1.6
Alejandra tells Arturo to stand up to his exploitative boss. Germán sprays himself with a pheromone lotion from the veterinarian.

=== Season 13 (2022) ===
No. overall	No. in season	Title	Original release date	Mexico viewers (millions)
224	1	"La herencia Rivers"	July 3, 2022	1.8
Lorena's father shows up at the Rivers' apartment to announce that he will inherit his daughter during his lifetime. Meanwhile, Germán has problems with the intercoms.
225	2	"Vidrio roto"	July 3, 2022	1.8
The Lopez Perez family put in their apartment a glass that was for Luis' window. Pedro needs to wear glasses.
226	3	"Las llaves de Angangueo"	July 3, 2022	1.8
The López Pérez family receives an invitation to the most important event in Angangueo. Meanwhile, Vanesa must retrieve a lost dog.
227	4	"Seguridad ante todo"	July 10, 2022	1.8
Luis asks Germán to put safety protections in the apartment for his son. Meanwhile, Rocko makes a casting call to form a rock band.
228	5	"Cumplemes"	July 10, 2022	1.8
Vanessa forgets Fabián's birthday and her friends help her prepare a surprise. Meanwhile, a student of Silvia's confesses that he is in love with her.
229	6	"Tu nueva mamá"	July 10, 2022	1.8
Lorena's father returns with the news that he married his nurse. Meanwhile, El Borre and Virginia launch their app to sell tacos.
230	7	"A lo chino"	July 17, 2022	1.8
The Lopez Perez's have a water debt and Luis confiscates their television. Meanwhile, Germán falls in love with Luisito Jr.'s new nanny.
231	8	"¿Dónde está Rambo?"	July 17, 2022	1.8
Pedro has lost Rambo and gets depressed. Meanwhile, Alejandra's mother-in-law wants to take the Lopez Perez family on vacation.
232	9	"Mollejitas 'Mi Flaquita'"	July 17, 2022	1.8
Arturo has the idea of setting up a food stand. Meanwhile, Pedro and Cris apply feng shui techniques in the apartment for good energies.
233	10	"Las cuotas del mantenimiento"	July 24, 2022	1.7
The daughters of the owner of the building want to increase the fees and the neighbors unite against them. Meanwhile, Silvia receives a visit from a friend from college.
234	11	"La ex de Rocko"	July 24, 2022	1.7
Rocko has contact with an ex-girlfriend and Alejandra gets jealous. Meanwhile, The Rivers take Luisito Jr. to some castings.
235	12	"Tomasa"	July 24, 2022	1.7
Luis buys a smart device to control the apartment and shows it off to the neighbors. Meanwhile, The López Pérez family raffles off a strange painting.
236	13	"La cruda"	July 31, 2022	1.6
Rocko and Alejandra had too much to drink the night before and don't remember anything that happened. Benito's cousins arrive to visit the Rivas family.

=== Season 14 (2023) ===
No. overall	No. in season	Title	Original release date	Mexico viewers (millions)
237	1	"Prueba de embarazo"	March 19, 2023	1.9
238	2	"La melena de Luis"	March 19, 2023	1.9
239	3	"Foto familiar"	March 19, 2023	1.9
240	4	"Abarrotes Don Arturo"	March 26, 2023	2.0
241	5	"Tapa calefactora"	March 26, 2023	2.0
242	6	"Regalo perfecto"	March 26, 2023	2.0
243	7	"El tendedero"	April 2, 2023	1.8
244	8	"Los 3 amigos"	April 2, 2023	1.8
245	9	"Auto nuevo"	April 2, 2023	1.8
246	10	"Taquitos veganos"	April 9, 2023	1.7
247	11	"Ropa de paca"	April 9, 2023	1.7
248	12	"Silvia Parrandera"	April 9, 2023	1.7
249	13	"Nano por un día"	April 16, 2023	1.3
250	14	"Germán vs. Pedro"	April 16, 2023	1.3

=== Season 15 (2023) ===
No. overall	No. in season	Title	Original release date	Mexico viewers (millions)
251	1	"Fundación para pobres"	April 16, 2023	1.7
252	2	"Albóndigas vs. mollejitas"	April 23, 2023	1.7
253	3	"Coaching para vecinos"	April 23, 2023	1.7
254	4	"Acapulco en la azotea"	April 23, 2023	1.7
255	5	"Cena en París"	April 30, 2023	1.2
256	6	"La peli de Frankie"	April 30, 2023	1.2
257	7	"La jubilación de Arturo"	April 30, 2023	1.2
258	8	"La estética de Lorena"	May 7, 2023	1.9
259	9	"Diva en el edificio"	May 7, 2023	1.9
260	10	"El gran sueño de Rocko"	May 7, 2023	1.9
261	11	"Ropa de paca"	May 14, 2023	1.8
262	12	"La reina del pin pop"	May 14, 2023	1.8
263	13	"El cumple de Luisito Jr."	May 14, 2023	1.8
264	14	"Qué bonita familia"	May 21, 2023	1.8

=== Season 16 (2024) ===
No. overall	No. in season	Title	Original release date	Mexico viewers (millions)
265	1	"Elote el guajolote"	June 9, 2024	1.52
266	2	"Nos cayeron los Chahuiztles"	June 9, 2024	1.52
267	3	"Adopción"	June 9, 2024	1.52
268	4	"Buzón de quejas"	June 16, 2024	1.20
269	5	"El suegro de Pedro"	June 16, 2024	1.20
270	6	"Oficinas de gobierno"	June 16, 2024	1.20
271	7	"Los mejores papás del mundo"	June 23, 2024	1.28
272	8	"El gorrión de la canción"	June 23, 2024	1.28
273	9	"El primer trabajo de Alejandra"	June 23, 2024	1.28
274	10	"Subasta, carísima por cierto"	June 30, 2024	1.32
275	11	"La crisis financiera de Vanessa"	June 30, 2024	1.32
276	12	"La mejor amiga de Magdalena"	June 30, 2024	1.32
277	13	"Todos son sospechosos"	July 7, 2024	1.34
278	14	"Los López Pérez se ganan un carro"	July 7, 2024	1.34
279	15	"La heroína laboral de Arturo"	July 7, 2024	1.34

=== Season 17 (2024) ===
No. overall	No. in season	Title	Original release date	Mexico viewers (millions)
280	1	"El retrato del tatarabuelo Higinio"	July 14, 2024	1.39
281	2	"Andrés Vaca dirige el equipo de futbol de los Vecinos"	July 14, 2024	1.39
282	3	"La boda de Pedro"	July 14, 2024	1.39
283	4	"Una mala apuesta"	July 21, 2024	1.81
284	5	"La edad de la punzada"	July 21, 2024	1.81
285	6	"Departamento en renta"	July 28, 2024	1.59
286	7	"El chat vecinal"	July 28, 2024	1.59
287	8	"Llegamos a 300 capítulos"	August 4, 2024	1.11
288	9	"Guía de turista"	August 4, 2024	1.11
289	10	"Las famosas tortas ahogadas de Regulo"	August 11, 2024	1.70
290	11	"La Casa de los Rijosos"	August 11, 2024	1.70
291	12	"La carnita asada de los López Pérez"	August 18, 2024	1.50
292	13	"Buscando novio"	August 18, 2024	1.50
293	14	"Navidad en primavera"	August 25, 2024	2.00
294	15	"Nueva chamba"	August 25, 2024	2.00

=== Season 18 (2025) ===
No. overall	No. in season	Title	Original release date	Mexico viewers (millions)
295	1	"Un mes sin Luisito"	February 23, 2025	3.22
296	2	"El casino a go go"	March 2, 2025	3.75
297	3	"El centro de reciclaje"	March 9, 2025	2.25
298	4	"El misterioso vecino del wifi"	March 16, 2025	2.75
299	5	"Nueva Administración"	March 23, 2025	2.77
300	6	"Maxicadena y candado"	March 30, 2025	2.57
301	7	"Germán Colón"	April 6, 2025	2.58
302	8	"El centro de reciclaje"	April 13, 2025	2.52
303	9	"Pedro celoso"	April 20, 2025	1.91
304	10	"La fonditería"	April 27, 2025	2.35
305	11	"Número equivocado"	May 4, 2025	2.13

=== Season 19 (2025) ===
No. overall	No. in season	Title	Original release date	Mexico viewers (millions)
306	1	"Cambio de cuerpos"	May 11, 2025	1.84
307	2	"Amor gótico"	May 18, 2025	1.36
308	3	"Vaquita Godín"	June 1, 2025	2.34
309	4	"Primera cita"	June 8, 2025	2.14
310	5	"Clases de manejo"	June 15, 2025	2.05
311	6	"La caja fuerte"	October 12, 2025	N/A
312	7	"Escencia relajante"	October 12, 2025	N/A
313	8	"Lluvias atípicas"	June 29, 2025	1.92
314	9	"Los 20 años de Silvita"	July 6, 2025	2.39
315	10	"El sobrino Eulalio"	July 13, 2025	2.33
316	11	"Sr. San Román"	July 20, 2025	1.61

=== Season 20 (2026) ===
No. overall	No. in season	Title	Original release date	Mexico viewers (millions)
317	1	"Sr. San Román 2"	March 29, 2026	N/A
318	2	"La mafia del vecindario"	March 29, 2026	N/A
319	3	"Germán rabioso"	March 29, 2026	N/A
320	4	"Terapia de hielos"	April 5, 2026	1.83
321	5	"Es mejor sonriendo"	April 5, 2026	1.83
322	6	"El tigre dormido"	April 5, 2026	1.83
323	7	"Curso de verano"	April 12, 2026	2.22
324	8	"Soy el bipolar"	April 12, 2026	2.22
325	9	"El Godín de Oro"	April 12, 2026	2.22
326	10	"El gran concurso de Don Baratón"	April 19, 2026	2.37
327	11	"La puerta secreta"	April 19, 2026	2.37

=== Season 21 (2026) ===
No. overall	No. in season	Title	Original release date (Note: All eleven episodes of the twenty-first season were released on Vix on 20 March 2026, ahead of their weekly Las Estrellas premieres.)	Mexico viewers (millions)
328	1	"Gemelos idénticos"	April 19, 2026	2.37
329	2	"Los huevos de Luis"	April 26, 2026	2.29
330	3	"Que bien tiznan"	April 26, 2026	2.29
331	4	"La che chismosa"	April 26, 2026	2.29
332	5	"Cambio de medidores"	March 20, 2026 (Vix)	N/A
333	6	"No soy portero"	March 20, 2026 (Vix)	N/A
334	7	"El video portero 1"	May 3, 2026	N/A
335	8	"El video portero 2"	May 3, 2026	N/A
336	9	"Deudores espectaculares"	March 20, 2026 (Vix)	N/A
337	10	"Vecinfest"	March 20, 2026 (Vix)	N/A
338	11	"Aguas con del agua"	May 3, 2026	N/A
