= Cuenta pendiente (TV series) =

2014 Mexican TV series

#CuentaPendiente
- Genre: Drama; Comedy; Fantasy
- Created by: Daniela Richer
- Written by: Daniela Richer
- Starring: Jaume Mateu; Monserrat Fligelman; David Angulo; Gilda Gentile
- Country of origin: Mexico
- Original language: Spanish
- No. of seasons: 1
- No. of episodes: 16 (list of episodes)

#CuentaPendiente (English: Pending Account) is a Mexican television series created by Daniela Richer and produced by Carlos Murguía. It premiered on February 24, 2014, on TeleHit and concluded on June 9 of the same year, consisting of a single season with 16 episodes.

== Plot ==
Roberto Villalva is an ambitious businessman who runs the technology company Redared. His attitude is that of a selfish young man who takes advantage of his social position to get what he wants. Suddenly, his life changes when, on his way to work, he is involved in a car crash that leaves him in a coma. While unconscious in the hospital, Roberto is taken to "La Muerte" represented by a voluptuous woman, who shows him an app called "DeathBook," which lists the people he had behaved rudely toward.

Roberto wants everything to return to normal, albeit with a different attitude than before the coma; however, "La Muerte" isn't sure if she wants to revive him. Later, the two make a deal in which, throughout the series, the young businessman will have to reincarnate as the people on the aforementioned list and also sacrifice one of his closest loved ones if he wants to live again.

== Cast ==
=== Main ===
- Roberto Villalva (played by Jaume Mateu) is a young entrepreneur and CEO of Redared, a technology company. He is portrayed as greedy, arrogant, narcissistic, and living a life of luxury; however, these attitudes would take their toll on him over time. Before arriving at work, Roberto is involved in a car accident that leaves him in a coma. While in the coma, he encounters La Muerte (portrayed as an attractive woman), and she makes him a deal: if he wants to revive, he will have to be reincarnated as the people he was rude to. Throughout the plot, already delving into people's psyches, Roberto will deal with his best friend Nicolás's interest in Mariana, his ex-girlfriend.
- La Muerte (played by Monserrat Fligelman) is an attractive woman who personifies death in the series. La Muerte is the one who decides whether Roberto will continue to live or not, using the DeathBook notes app. She often torments Roberto when he's incarnated as someone else, although she deeply cares for him. In the eleventh episode, it is revealed that her real name was Abigail, a high-society woman who also died in a car accident.
- Nicolás (played by David Angulo) is Roberto's best friend and main partner in Redared. Nicolás takes advantage of Roberto's condition to try to win Mariana's heart, getting engaged with her. However, at the end of the series, the couple suffers the same fate as Roberto, except they died outright. It is also revealed that Nicolás was the mastermind behind what happened to his former best friend, as revenge for having taken one of his girlfriends away from him. He ends up being "sacrificed" by Roberto through La Muerte.
- Mariana (played by Gilda Gentile) was Roberto's girlfriend, and later Nicolás's. She worked as an executive at Redared, proving herself to be a persevering and motivated woman. In the penultimate episode, Mariana gets engaged to Nicolás, but in the series finale, they both die in a car crash; Roberto is shocked to see Mariana's body, since he only wanted Nicolás dead to prevent him from winning her over.
- Claudio (played is Mario Zaragoza) is a mechanic and recurring character in the series, portrayed as an antagonist. In the final episode, it is revealed that he helped Nicolás get revenge on Roberto for stealing his girlfriend by shooting out the car's tire, thus causing the incident that left Roberto in a coma.
- Luisa (played is Morena González) is the cleaner of Redared.
- Juanito Madero is one of Redared's employees, who uses a wheelchair. He's a hard-working and tenacious man, but also an introvert. Juanito was fired by Roberto on the same day the company celebrated its tenth anniversary, blaming him for something he didn't do. Like Nicolás, he had also been included on the DeathBook list, which is why Roberto reincarnated as him to get him a job at Enlace Global, a rival company to Redared.

=== Recurring and guest stars ===
- Natalia Téllez
- Sofía Garza
- Bárbara Islas
- Lucila Mariscal
- Lili Goret
- Karla Gómez
- Darío Ripoll
- José Luis Cordero
- Claudio Rodríguez Medellín
- Mauricio Castillo
- Eduardo España
- Oscar Burgos
- Raquel Garza
- Roxana Castellanos

== Episodes ==
No. overall	No. in season	Title	Original release date
1	1	"El inicio"	24 February 2014
The plot begins with Roberto as a child, showing how he lost his mother, who was a nurse, and is left under the guardianship of his authoritarian father. Eighteen years later, Roberto is a successful businessman and owner of the technology company Redared, although he has an arrogant and rude personality. However, one day, Roberto suffers a car crash, and during his coma, he is sent to "La Muerte" (The Death), who shows him an application called DeathBook, which contains a list of people to whom Roberto was rude. She tells him that if he wants to live again, he must remedy his behavior towards people by reincarnating as those on the list and "sacrifice" someone of his choice so that La Muerte can take his life and he can continue living as he did before the accident.
2	2	"El pañal"	3 March 2014
While Roberto and Nicolás (his partner in Redared) were playing pranks on pedestrians, they suddenly encounter a young man named Cristian, whom Roberto pushes until he is covered in mud, causing the boy to be nicknamed "El Pañal" (The Diaper). Roberto will have to help him rebuild his self-esteem. To do so, Roberto will have to dance with Alicia, the most popular girl in school and Cristian's crush.
3	3	"Sofía"	10 March 2014
Sofía is a reporter who wrote a negative review of one of Redared's apps. She lost credibility due to false information that Roberto gave her in revenge for the review, so he will have to take on her role.
4	4	"Don Jorge"	17 March 2014
Don Jorge is a man who went blind, which is why Roberto fired him from Redared. In order to help him, Roberto will have to recover Don Jorge's grandfather's watch, which he pawned to raise money before it is sold.
5	5	"Ricardo"	24 March 2014
Ricardo is a young man whose dream was to be a rock star. However, Roberto was fed up with the noise he and his band made, so he invited them to his house for apple juice and took the opportunity to plant sleeping pills to prevent them from performing at a concert. Therefore, Roberto will have to take on the role of the band's leader, gather the members, and give the concert.
6	6	"Toño Moncada"	31 March 2014
Toño Moncada couldn't tell Diana that she was the love of his life, and Roberto's mission, who in life had separated them out of jealousy that Diana ignored him, is to find the girl to give her the kiss that Toño couldn't give her that night.
7	7	"Xoan Wei"	7 April 2014
Xoan Wei is a Chinese programmer who wants to share the same app Redared is developing with the world, albeit at no cost, but the company doesn't agree. Later, as he drives him to the airport, Roberto abandons him in a deserted area so he can charge for the app. But his mission is to help Xoan find his way back home.
8	8	"Guaja"	14 April 2014
After his mother's death, Roberto became the owner of the pharmacy she had previously donated. However, he ended up selling it to a businessman, something that Dr. Gustavo Guajardo and the residents who lived nearby didn't think was a good idea. Roberto's mission is to help a team of firefighters raise money to restore the clinic.
9	9	"Ana"	21 April 2014
Ana asks her friend Mariana to look after her dog while she goes on vacation, but when she asks Roberto to take care of it while they're enjoying a picnic, he abandons it on the street instead of looking after it. His mission is to find the dog and return it to Ana's home.
10	10	"El Torbellino Lozano"	28 April 2014
Roberto tries to introduce a Redared app into a video game convention. To gain entry, he steals Andrés "El Torbellino" Lozano's access. Seeking to save Andrés's life, Roberto enters an annual video game tournament.
11	11	"Misión cumplida"	5 May 2014
Roberto left his grandfather in a nursing home where the nurse mistreats him and the other elderly people, so his mission is to help him escape. In this episode, while viewing files hidden from the nurses, he discovers the true identity of La Muerte an attractive, wealthy woman named Abigail, whose fate was similar to his own.
12	12	"Juanito"	12 May 2014
Juanito Madero, one of Redared's employees, was fired by Roberto when the company was celebrating its tenth anniversary for reasons that were not his fault. To remedy the situation, Roberto tried to find him a vacant position at Enlace Global, Redared's rival company.
13	13	"Regreso al mundo"	19 May 2014
Roberto dresses up as a clown for children's parties, while La Muerte is visited by a friend who tells him that her mission is more complicated than Roberto's, since he wants to return to his old life.
14	14	"Sin memoria"	26 May 2014
Gustavo Brito was preparing to return home after years of not seeing his loved ones, but as he was crossing the street, Roberto accidentally ran him over while driving on the phone. To avoid any trouble, he decided to hide the man's body. Roberto's mission is to find Gustavo's partner and return home.
15	15	"La elección (Part 1)"	2 June 2014
La Muerte is proud of Roberto for having been more humble with people, but upon reviewing the DeathBook list, it is revealed that there is one person missing that Roberto will have to reincarnate as if he wishes to revive: Nicolás; the reason he appeared on the list was that Roberto, despite being engaged to Mariana, had hooked up with his best friend's girlfriend. Roberto's mission is to retrieve Nicolás's aunt's engagement ring, with which he will propose to Mariana, who is now Nicolás's fiancée. However, Roberto is no longer sure he wants to fight to stay alive after that.
16	16	"La elección (Part 2)"	9 June 2014
The episode continues the plot from the previous episode, where La Muerte asks Roberto to help Nicolás by proposing to Mariana. However, Roberto has a dispute with Nicolás's aunt's lawyer over the ring, which her young son ends up swallowing. With the ring recovered, Roberto fulfills the mission he needed to emerge from his coma. When La Muerte asks him who should die, Roberto decides to sacrifice himself due to the anger he felt at seeing Nicolás and Mariana engaged. La Muerte, instead of agreeing, reveals that Nicolás was the mastermind behind the accident, sending his friend Claudio to shoot out the tire. Because of this, Roberto decides to sacrifice his former best friend, but what he didn't know was that Mariana would also die alongside Nicolás, and he was shocked to see the bodies. In the final scene of the series, La Muerte's friend appears to tell her and Roberto that "neither of them had concluded," referring to the deal they had agreed to.
