= Darío Ripoll =

Mexican actor (born 1970)

Dario Ripoll
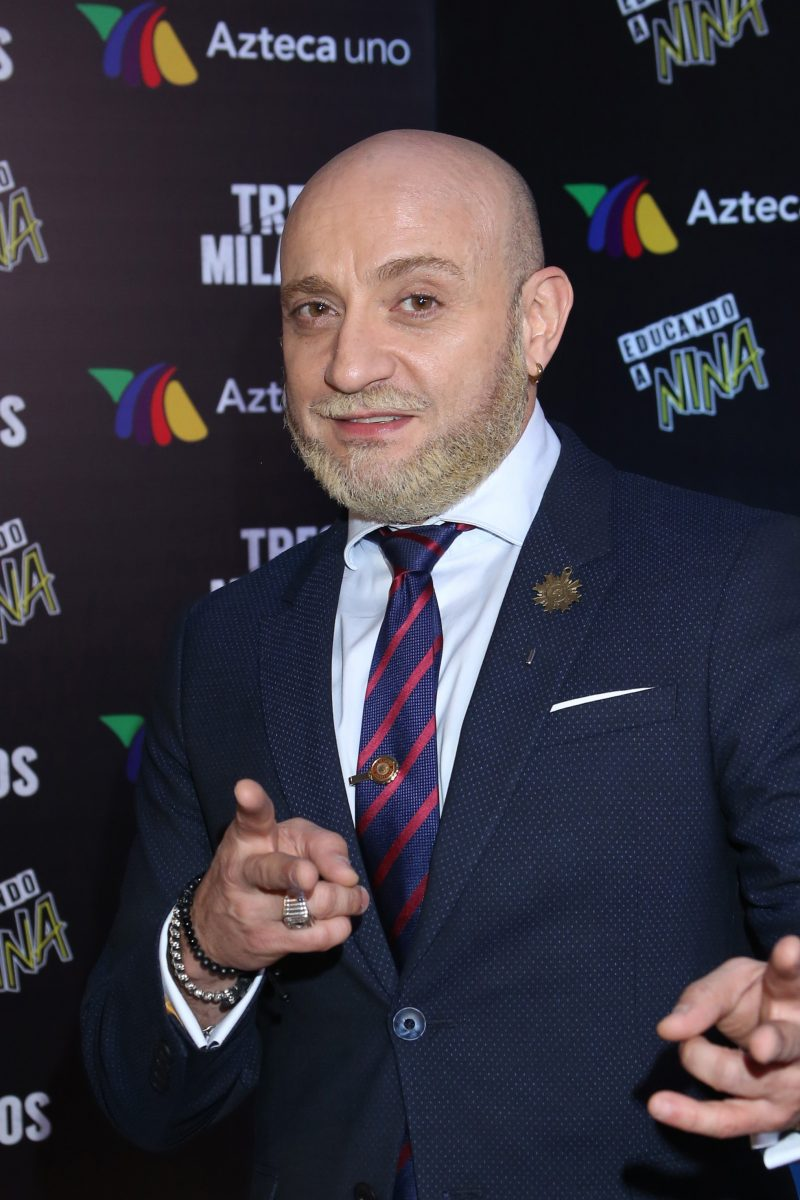
- Born: Dario Ripoll Herrera; May 16, 1970 (age 56); San Pedro Garza Garcia, Monterrey, Nuevo Leon, Mexico
- Education: Instituto Nacional de Bellas Artes y Literatura
- Occupation: Actor
- Years active: 1992–present
- Height: 1.70 m (5 ft 7 in)

Darío Ripoll Herrera (born May 16, 1970, San Pedro Garza García) is a Mexican actor and dubbing actor.

== Career ==
Darío Ripoll studied a Bachelor of Acting at the National School of Theater Art of the INBA. He has taken acting training courses and acting specialization in cinema, with the directors: Nacho Ortíz, Joaquin Bissner and Luis Felipe Tovar.

On television he has participated in soap operas such as: La fea más bella, Yo amo a Juan Querendón, Alma de Hierro, A lucky family and in series such as The Simulators, Thirteen Fears, Los héroes del norte, Hermanos y detectives, Addicts, XY, Mujeres Asesinas 3, La Familia Peluche (third season).

Since 2005 he was in Vecinos where he played Luis San Román with Mayrin Villanueva, Macaria, Octavio Ocaña, Pablo Valentín, Manuel "Flaco" Ibáñez and Ana Bertha Espín.

In 2012 he participated in the telenovela "Porque el amor manda" together with Fernando Colunga, Blanca Soto, Erick Elías, Alejandro Avila, Jeimy Osorio, Ricardo Margaleff, Violeta Isfel among others.

== Filmography ==
=== Telenovelas ===
Year	Title	Role
2018	Educating Nina	Van Damme
2017	La Piloto	Eladio "El Bochas"
2015	Mi corazón es tuyo	Judge at Ana and Fernando's Wedding
2012–2013	Porque el amor manda	Oliverio Cárdenas
2011	Una familia con suerte	Raymundo "Ray Pelonch"
2008–2009	Alma de hierro	Monchi
2007–2008	Yo amo a Juan Querendón	Oswaldo Ibarra
2006–2007	La fea más bella	Eder Roza del Moral

=== TV series ===
- Forever Joan Sebastian (2016) – Chucho Rendón
- Nosotros los guapos (2016) – Role special (Season 1 Episode:La imigración)
- Logout (2015) – Harmony
- The Plush Family (2012) – Plush Police
- Star2 (2012) – Various characters
- Los Simuladores (2008) – Partner of the construction company
- Vecinos (2005–2008/2012/2017–present) – Luis San Román
- Furcio (2000–2002)

=== Dubbing ===
- Batman: Arkham Origins (2013) – Joker (voice)
- Batman: Arkham Knight (2015) – Joker (voice)
