= Concierto de almas =

Concierto de almas may refer to:

- Concierto de almas (TV series), a 1969 Mexican telenovela
- Concierto de almas (film), a 1942 Argentine film
