= Ladronzuela =

Mexican telenovela

- Genre: Telenovela
- Created by: Original Story: Yolanda Vargas Dulché
- Directed by: Fernando Chacón; Rafael Banquells; Dimitrios Sarras
- Starring: Macaria; Juan Ferrara
- Country of origin: Mexico
- Original language: Spanish

Production
- Executive producer: Valentín Pimstein
- Cinematography: Rafael Banquells

Original release
- Network: Canal de las Estrellas
- Release: 1977

Ladronzuela is a Mexican telenovela produced by Miguel Ángel Herrera for Televisa in 1977.

== Cast ==
- Macaria as Perlita
- Juan Ferrara as Miguel Angel
- Rocio Banquells as Gilda
- Salvador Pineda as Gabriel
- Beatriz Aguirre
- Lili Inclán
- Patricia Meyer
- Dina de Marco
- Alfredo Wally Barrón
- Luis Miranda
- Rosa Furman
- Cristina Moreno
- Wally Barrón
- Alma Delfina
