= Lorena Enríquez =

Mexican actress (born 1980)

- Born: Lorena Enríquez; February 22, 1980 (age 46); Ciudad de México, Mexico
- Occupations: Actress and hostess
- Years active: 1995–present

Lorena Enríquez (born February 22, 1980) is a Mexican actress and hostess. She featured in the Mexican soap opera Un Gancho al Corazón.

== Career ==
=== Theater ===
- La Sirenita Role: Ariel
- Blanca Nieves y los 7 enanos Role: Blanca Nieves
- Aladino y la lámpara maravillosa Role: Princesa Jazmín
- El rey león Role: Fairy tale elf
- Peter Pan Role: narrator
- Una navidad con Mickey Role: Elf
- Un cuento de navidad Role: Mildred
- Magia y misterio Role: Arcana
- Todo quedó en familia Role: Laura
- No puedo Role: Silvana
- Las preciosas ridículas (Molière) Role: Madelon
- El zoo de cristal (Tennessee Williams). Role: Laura Wingfield

=== Television ===
==== Soap operas ====
- Como dice el dicho (2013). Role: Celia
- Llena de Amor (2010). Role: Doris
- Un gancho al corazón (2008–2009). Role: Paula
- Pasión (2008). Role: Conchita (special appearance)
- Amor sin maquillaje (2007). Role: Berta. Estelar
- Apuesta por un amor (2005). Role: Soledad
- Velo de novia (2003). Role: Inés
- El manantial (2001–2002). Role: Maru
- El precio de tu amor (2000). Role: Columba
- Serafín (1999). Role: Martha
- Te sigo amando (1996–1997). Role: Consuelito
- Mujer, casos de la vida real
- Diseñador ambos sexos
- La jaula

==== Films ====
- Mujeres infieles
