= Alicia Bonet =

Mexican actress (1947–2025)

- Born: Alicia Bonet Ceballos; April 26, 1947; Mexico City, Mexico
- Died: October 26, 2025 (aged 78); Mexico City, Mexico
- Occupation: Actress
- Years active: 1962–2013
- Spouse(s): Juan Ferrara (divorced) Claudio Brook (died 1995)
- Children: 4

Alicia Bonet Ceballos (April 26, 1947 – October 26, 2025) was a Mexican actress.

== Life and career ==
Bonet was born in Mexico City on April 26, 1947. Throughout her career, she was credited in a number of films and telenovelas, including: Bachelorette Party (1966), Even the Wind Is Afraid (1968), The Scapular (1968) and Ruby (1970), Los que ayudan a Dios (1973), Viviana (1978) and Lo que callamos las mujeres (2007–2013).

She was married twice. Her first marriage was to actor Juan Ferrara. They had two sons, Juan Carlos and Mauricio. Later, she married actor Claudio Brook, known for his collaborations with Luis Buñuel. From this union, her sons Arturo and Gabriel were born.

Bonet died on October 26, 2025, at the age of 78.
