= Riquísimos, por cierto =

- Genre: Sitcom
- Created by: Elías Solorio
- Written by: Jorge Garza; Pepe Sierra; Julio Reyes; Tobías Camba; Mary Carrillo; Martha García
- Directed by: Jorge Garza
- Starring: Macaria; Moisés Suárez; Danny Perea; Markin López; Saíd Casab; Wendy Braga; Iker Madrid; Guadalupe Rammath; Eduardo España
- Composer: Miguel Góngora
- Country of origin: Mexico
- Original language: Spanish
- No. of seasons: 2
- No. of episodes: 30

Production
- Executive producer: Elías Solorio
- Editors: Emir López; Luis Arvizu
- Production company: TelevisaUnivision

Original release
- Network: Vix
- Release: 7 February 2025 – present

Related
- Vecinos

Riquísimos, por cierto is a Mexican television sitcom created by Elías Solorio. A spin-off of Vecinos, it follows the López Pérez family moving into a mansion in Angangueo after their uncle Fidel dies and leaves them his fortune, but in order to gain access to it they must meet his demands. The series stars Macaria, Moisés Suárez, Danny Perea, Markin López, Saíd Casab, Wendy Braga, Iker Madrid, Guadalupe Rammath and Eduardo España. It premiered on Vix on 7 February 2025. The second season premiered on 15 May 2026.

== Cast ==
=== Main ===
- Macaria as Magdalena Pérez López
- Moisés Suárez as Arturo López
- Danny Perea as Alejandra López Pérez
- Markin López as Rocko
- Saíd Casab as Morrison "Morris"
- Wendy Braga as Leopoldina
- Iker Madrid as Cástulo
- Guadalupe Rammath as Gumara
- Clarita as Arturo the Donkey
- Eduardo España as Germán Martínez

=== Recurring and guest stars ===
- Carlos Bonavides as Licenciado Elvis Conde
- Cynthia Hernández as Gladys
- Fernando Manzano
- Yolanda Navarrete
- Vicente Ferrer
- Hildeberto Maya
- Eric de la Vega
- Humberto Elizondo as Diego del Pino
- Keila Villegas as Aranza
- Raquel Bigorra as Martha / Evelia
- Mauricio Llera
- Salvador Zerboni
- Bárbara Islas as Paris
- Isabella Tena as Taylor
- Carla Suescun
- Yulleni Vertti
- Farah Justiniani
- Yoselin Sánchez
- Alma Gómez "Cositas"
- Homero Ferruzca
- Melanie Garibay
- Eli López
- Viviana Jaimes

== Episodes ==
Season	Episodes	Originally released
1	15	7 February 2025
2	15	15 May 2026

=== Season 1 (2025) ===
No. overall	No. in season	Title	Original release date
1	1	"La herencia"	7 February 2025
2	2	"La casa inteligente"	7 February 2025
3	3	"Los XV de Morris"	7 February 2025
4	4	"La flor más bella de Angangueo"	7 February 2025
5	5	"La prima y San Arturo"	7 February 2025
6	6	"Terapia millonaria"	7 February 2025
7	7	"Arturo, el nuevo hombre"	7 February 2025
8	8	"Bodas de plata"	7 February 2025
9	9	"El manual de carroña"	7 February 2025
10	10	"Cena 5 estrellas"	7 February 2025
11	11	"La tocada con Erik Rubín"	7 February 2025
12	12	"La vecina"	7 February 2025
13	13	"Yate mi flaquita"	7 February 2025
14	14	"Hoyo en uno o dos"	7 February 2025
15	15	"Pobres otra vez"	7 February 2025

=== Season 2 (2026) ===
No. overall	No. in season	Title	Original release date
16	1	"Como dos gotas de agua"	15 May 2026
17	2	"Tanda VIP"	15 May 2026
18	3	"La ópera"	15 May 2026
19	4	"Robot en casa"	15 May 2026
20	5	"El peluquín de Don Arturo"	15 May 2026
21	6	"Vamos a la playa"	15 May 2026
22	7	"Los ricos también rebuznan"	15 May 2026
23	8	"Burro perdido"	15 May 2026
24	9	"Rocko vibrando alto"	15 May 2026
25	10	"Juegos de alambre"	15 May 2026
26	11	"La subasta"	15 May 2026
27	12	"Como burro en primavera"	15 May 2026
28	13	"Dieta fit"	15 May 2026
29	14	"Escuela a todo dark"	15 May 2026
30	15	"Cria burros y te sacaran los ojos"	15 May 2026

== Awards and nominations ==
Year	Award	Category	Nominated	Result	Ref
2025	Produ Awards	Best Sitcom	Riquísimos, por cierto	Nominated	
