= Jaume Mateu (actor) =

Mexican actor (born 1985)

- Born: Jaume Mateu Lagrange; 12 December 1985 (age 40); Mexico City, Mexico
- Occupation: Actor
- Years active: 2009–present

Jaume Mateu Lagrange (born 12 December 1985 in Mexico City, Mexico) is a Mexican actor. He began his career with a recurring character on the Televisa's telenovela Camaleones. His first notable role was as David Mondragón in the Mexican drama La fuerza del destino, and became part of the main cast of several telenovelas, including La mujer del Vendaval (2012), La sombra del pasado (2014), and Pasión y poder (2015).

== Filmography ==
Film roles
Year	Title	Roles	Notes
2014	Agua Blanca	Sebastián	Short film

Television roles
Year	Title	Roles	Notes
2009	Mujeres asesinas	DIEM	Recurring role; 7 episodes
2009–2010	Camaleones	Céspedes	Recurring role
2010	Morir en martes	Aldo Marretti	Recurring role; 6 episodes
2011	La fuerza del destino	David Mondragón	Main cast; 77 episodes
2012	Como dice el dicho	Jorge	Episode: "El que la hace la paga"
2012–2013	La mujer del Vendaval	Mauro Urquiza	Main cast; 135 episodes
2014	Cuenta pendiente	Roberto Villalva	Main role; 16 episodes
2014–2015	La sombra del pasado	Patricio	Main cast; 82 episodes
2015–2016	Pasión y poder	Miguel Montenegro	Main cast; 119 episodes
2018	La bella y las bestias	Simón Narváez	Main cast
2021	Fuego ardiente	Rodrigo	Main cast
2023	El maleficio	Fernando Salgado	
2026	Tan cerca de ti, nace el amor	Iván	

== Theater ==
Theater roles
Year	Title	Character	Place
2010	Othello	Various characters	Teatro Juan Ruiz de Alarcón
2012	Los insignificantes	Hamblet	Teatro 11 de Julio, Mexico
