= Dalilah Polanco =

Mexican actress

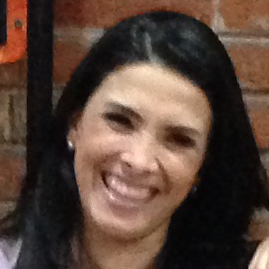
- Polanco in 2018
- Born: Dalilah Esthela Pérez Polanco; 27 November 1971 (age 54); Guasave, Sinaloa
- Occupation: Actress
- Years active: 1986–present

Dalilah Esthela Pérez Polanco (born 27 November 1971), known professionally as Dalilah Polanco, is a Mexican actress. She is known for playing the role of Martina in the sitcom La familia P. Luche.

== Career ==
Polanco made her acting debut on television. In 1995, she appeared as a quinceañera in the telenovela La Paloma and in Mujer, Casos de la Vida Real. Her fourth telenovela role was in El Privilegio de Amar in 1998, followed by Mi Destino Eres Tú in 2000. In 2002, she appeared in the sitcom La familia P. Luche, playing Martina, a role that brought her recognition on Mexican television. Throughout the rest of the decade she continued to appear in telenovelas, including Querida enemiga and Los exitosos Pérez.

From 2014 to 2016, Polanco hosted the morning show De buenas on Mexiquense TV, alongside Héctor "El Apio" Quijano and Martha Guzmán. In 2018, she starred in the sitcom Simón dice, playing the role of Beatriz. In 2025, she appeared as a cast member on the third season of La casa de los famosos México, finishing as runner-up for the season.

Polanco has also participated in various theater productions, including Mentiras, el musical and Mame, el musical.

== Filmography ==
=== Television roles ===
Year	Title	Role	Notes
1986	Monte Calvario	Chole	
1993–1994	Valentina	Consuelito	
1995	La Paloma	Armida	
1995–2004	Mujer, Casos de la Vida Real	Various roles	
1998–1999	El Privilegio de Amar	Casilda	
2000	Mi Destino Eres Tú	Noemí	
2002	Cómplices Al Rescate	Nina Kuti Kuti	
2002–2007	La familia P. Luche	Martina de Galax	Recurring role (seasons 1–2)
2004–2005	Apuesta por un amor	Juana	
2007	Al diablo con los guapos	Ernestina	
2007	Palabra de mujer	Irma López	
2008	Querida enemiga	Greta	
2009–2010	Los exitosos Pérez	Daniela	
2009–2010	Camaleones	Herminia	
2012	Amorcito corazón	Katherine	
2012	Por ella soy Eva	Lucía Zárate	
2018–2019	Simón dice	Beatriz	Main role
2019	Por amar sin ley	Estefanía Córdova	Guest star
2019–2020	Médicos, línea de vida	Luz González	Main cast
2021–2025	¡Cuéntamelo ya!	Host	
2022	Los ricos también lloran	Isabela "Chabela" Pérez de Domínguez	Main cast
2023	Eternamente amándonos	Eva Gómez	Main cast
2025	La casa de los famosos México	Houseguest	Runner-up (season 3)
2026	Tierra de amor y coraje	Jovita	
2027	Te esperaba		
