= Un gancho al corazón =

Mexican telenovela

- Genre: Telenovela
- Based on: Sos mi vida by Adrián Suar and Ernesto Korovsky
- Written by: Juan Carlos Alcalá; Rosa Salazar Arenas; Fermín Zúñiga; Juan Carlos Tejeda
- Directed by: Sergio Cataño; Alejandro Gamboa; Claudio Reyes Rubio; Sergio Quintero
- Starring: Danna García; Sebastián Rulli; Raúl Araiza; Ana Martín; Otto Sirgo; Eugenia Cauduro; Laisha Wilkins
- Theme music composer: Alonzo Davolos; Angela Davolos
- Opening theme: "Un gancho al corazón" performed by Playa Limbo
- Country of origin: Mexico
- Original language: Spanish
- No. of episodes: 220

Production
- Executive producer: Angelli Nesma Medina
- Producer: Ignacio Alarcón
- Production locations: Tepoztlán, Morelos
- Cinematography: Claudio Lara; Armando Zafra
- Editors: Octavio Lopez; Daniel Renteria
- Running time: 42-45 minutes
- Production company: Televisa

Original release
- Network: Canal de las Estrellas
- Release: August 25, 2008 – June 26, 2009

Un gancho al corazón (English title: A Blow to the Heart) is a Mexican telenovela produced by Angelli Nesma Medina for Televisa that aired from August 25, 2008, to June 26, 2009. It is based on the Argentine telenovela Sos mi vida. In the United States the telenovela aired on Univision from June 22, 2009, to May 3, 2010. Un gancho al corazón was released on DVD on October 5, 2010.

Danna García and Sebastián Rulli star in the lead roles, while Laisha Wilkins, Roberto Blandón, Agustín Arana and Macaria starred as antagonists. Raúl Araiza, Margarita Magaña and Ana Martin starred as stellar performances.

== Plot ==
Valentina López is a young professional boxer known as "La Monita". Roberto "Beto" Ochoa is her trainer and boyfriend, who puts her under pressure to train and win so he can get money for himself and his mother, Nieves. Nieves raised "Monita" because her own mother, Isabel, abandoned her.

In another place within the city is an enterprise called Sermeño Group, a realty enterprise owned by Mauricio Sermeño, an ex-car racer who wants to retire and have a family. Mauricio is engaged to Constanza, a selfish and rude woman. Mauricio is convinced that Constanza is the love of his life, even though her foul attitude and bad manners bother him. After a hand injury, "Monita" decides to find a different job in order to sustain her lazy boyfriend and her "mother-in-law". With the help of her best friends Estrella and Paula, she goes to an interview at Sermeño Group, and after an eventful day, is hired as a secretary. Mauricio is convinced that "Monita" is honest and warm hearted and is attracted to her personality. With each day they spend together, they begin to fall in love, but because they are both in relationships, they hide their feelings in order to not hurt their significant others, unaware of their actions and unequal disregard for their feelings.

Mauricio is sure he wants to have a family, so he adopts three orphans named Aldo, Luisa, and Danny. Mauricio's cousin, Jeronimo, and Constanza disapprove of his decision. They try to make Mauricio change his mind but he is adamant he wants the kids in his life and says he will not abandon them. The children like "Monita" because she is kind to them and treats them as if they were her own children. They all quickly establish a close friendship and this captivates Mauricio, seeing Valentina as a potential partner. Unlike Valentina, Constanza hates the children, and since she is not kind, the kids reciprocate her feelings toward them. Constanza, Jeronimo, and Óscar, an unloyal employee of Sermeño Group, join forces to split Mauricio, "Monita", and the kids apart.

Even though Valentina and Mauricio fall in love with each other, they do not act on their feelings. Beto starts to fight in lucha libre as "El Fantasma Vengador" in order to bring in income so that Valentina feels better about him. He and Constanza meet and have sex, later trying to keep it a secret from their significant others, especially after they realize that Mauricio and Valentina are in love with each other. They will do anything to keep them apart.

== Cast ==
=== Main ===
- Danna García as Valentina López "La Monita"
- Sebastián Rulli as Mauricio Sermeño
- Raúl Araiza as Roberto "Beto" Ochoa
- Ana Martín as Nieves Ochoa
- Otto Sirgo as Salvador Ulloa
- Eugenia Cauduro as Gabriela "Gaby" Palacios
- Laisha Wilkins as Constanza "Conny" Lerdo de Tejada Moncada / "La Momia"
- Úrsula Prats as Jacqueline Moncada
- Eric del Castillo as Marcos Lerdo de Tejada

=== Also main ===
- Roberto Blandón as Óscar Cárdenas Villavicencio
- Agustín Arana as Jeronimo Sermeño
- Verónica Jaspeado as Ximena Sermeño de Klunder
- Alex Sirvent as Rolando Klunder
- Lorena Enríquez as Paula Méndez
- Pablo Valentín as Tano
- Irma Lozano as Teresa García
- Raúl Padilla "Chóforo" as Don César
- Raquel Pankowsky as Bernarda
- Susana Lozano as Lorenza de Ulloa
- Ricardo Fastlicht as Lic. Marcos Bonilla
- Alejandro de la Madrid as Ricardo
- Carlos Ignacio as Mario
- Edgardo Eliezer as El Costeño
- Manuel Ojeda as Don Hilario Ochoa
- Margarita Magaña as Estrella Falcón
- Raquel Morell as Gertrudis
- Vilmatraca as Dorita
- Malillany Marín as Anastasia
- Luis Gatica as El Colmillos
- José Luis Reséndez as Fausto Buenrostro
- Manuel "Flaco" Ibáñez as Dr. Lefort
- Karla Álvarez as Regina
- Norma Herrera as Alicia Rosales
- Macaria as Isabel López
- Xavier Ortiz as Lalo Mora
- Mike Biagio as Cristián Bermudez
- Ricardo Margaleff as Arnoldo Klunder
- Martha Ofelia Galindo as Bruja Bartola
- Jorge De Silva as El Lobo
- Luis Uribe as Jairo
- Jaime Lozano as Jimmy

=== Recurring ===
- Ricardo Abarca as Aldo Hernández / Aldo Sermeño Lerdo de Tejada
- Felipe Sánchez as Iván García
- Renata Notni as Luisa Hernández / Luisa Sermeño Lerdo de Tejada
- Nicole Casteele as Daniela "Danny" Hernández / Daniela "Danny" Sermeño Lerdo de Tejada
- Lucia Zerecero as Katia Lerdo de Tejada Moncada
- Aldo Gallardo as Hector

=== Guest stars ===
- Mariana Juárez as herself
- Ana María Torres as herself
- Cibernético as himself

== Production ==
Production officially began on July 28, 2008. To prepare for her role, Danna García received advice from several boxers like Jesús Martínez, Mariana Juárez and Ana María Torres.

== Awards and nominations ==
Year	Award	Category	Nominated	Result
2010	28th TVyNovelas Awards			
2010	28th TVyNovelas Awards	Best Actor	Sebastián Rulli	Nominated
2010	28th TVyNovelas Awards	Best Co-star Actor	Raúl Araiza	Won
2010	28th TVyNovelas Awards	Best Direction of the Camaras	Armando Zafra	Nominated
2010	28th TVyNovelas Awards	Best Musical Theme	"Un gancho al corazón"	Nominated
2010	Premios ACE	Best Actor	Sebastián Rulli	Won
