= Juan Ferrara =

Mexican actor

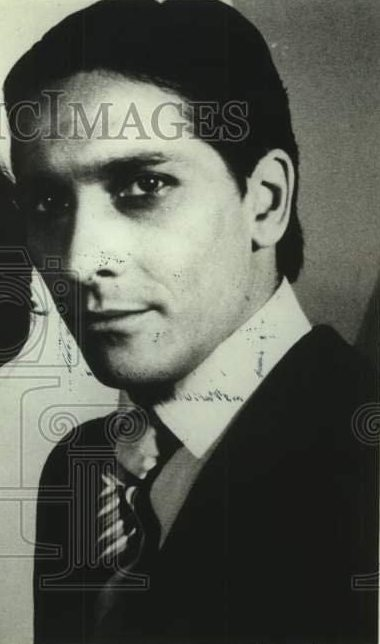
- Ferrara in 1978
- Born: Juan Félix Gutiérrez Puerta; November 8, 1943 (age 82); Guadalajara, Jalisco, Mexico
- Occupation: Actor
- Spouses: Helena Rojo (divorced) Alicia Bonet (divorced)
- Children: 2
- Mother: Ofelia Guilmáin
- Relatives: Lucía Guilmáin (sister)

Juan Ferrara (born Juan Félix Gutiérrez Puerta; November 8, 1943) is a Mexican actor.

== Family ==
Juan is a son of Ofelia Guilmáin and brother of Lucía Guilmáin and of Esther Guilmáin. He was twice married to the Mexican actresses, Alicia Bonet and Helena Rojo. He has two sons, actors Juan Carlos Bonet and Mauricio Bonet, with his first wife, Alicia Bonet.

== Biography ==
Ferrara demonstrated an interest in acting since he was a young child. But it wasn't until he was 22 that he booked his first job as an actor. He changed his name to Juan Ferrara before playing a small role in the 1965 movie, "Tajimara". In 1966, he got his first major movie role, as Sonny in Los Ángeles de Puebla. Ferrara by then had graduated from Televisa's renowned acting school, and producers decided to cast him as a star in his own telenovela, El Espejismo Brillaba. The novela became a hit across Mexico and Latin America.

In 1970, he starred in two successful novelas, Yesenia and La Gata. In 1978, Ferrara was in Viviana, another extremely successful novela. He portrayed Julio Montesinos. In 1982 Ferrara then went on to star in Gabriel y Gabriela, though it was not as successful as his previous ventures.

1983 proved to be an important career year for Ferrara, as he established himself as an actor in Puerto Rico as well. Hired by Canal 2, he filmed Laura Guzman, Culpable!, a soap opera that became one of Puerto Rico's most seen television programs ever. Due to the novela's overwhelming popularity in Puerto Rico, the network decided to bring Ferrara back in 1985, to film a telenovela called Tanairi. Ferrara starred alongside Von Marie Mendez in this soap opera.

== Television ==
Year	Title	Role	Notes
1966	El espejismo brillaba		Antagonist
1968	Los inconformes		Supporting role
1969	Lo que no fue	Alberto	Supporting role
1969	Concierto de almas	Jorge	Supporting role
1969	Del altar a la tumba	Agustín Alatorre	Protagonist
1970	Yesenia	Bardo	Co-Protagonist
1970	La Gata	Pablo Martínez Negrete	Protagonist
1974	El manantial del milagro	Carlos	Supporting role
1975	Ven conmigo	Guillermo	Supporting role
1978	Ladronzuela	Miguel Ángel	Protagonist
1978-79	Viviana	Julio Montesinos	Co-Protagonist
1981	El hogar que yo robé	Carlos Valentín Velarde	Protagonist
1982	Gabriel y Gabriela	Fernando del Valle	Protagonist
1983	¡Laura Guzmán, culpable!		Protagonist
1984	Milí		Protagonist
1985	Tanairí	Gustavo Medina	Protagonist
1987-88	Victoria	José Eduardo de los Santos	Protagonist
1990	Destino	Claudio de la Mora	Protagonist
1991-92	Valeria y Maximiliano	Maximiliano Riva	Protagonist
1993	Valentina	Fernando Alcántara	Protagonist
1996	La antorcha encendida	Don Pedro de Soto	Main antagonist
1997-98	Desencuentro	Andrés Rivera	Protagonist
1999	Infierno en el paraíso	Alejandro Valdivia	Protagonist
2002	¡Vivan los niños!	Lic. Mauricio Borbolla	Supporting role
2004-06	Rebelde	Franco Colucci	Adult Protagonist
2006	Heridas de amor	Gonzalo San Llorente (young)	Special Appearance
2007-08	Pasión	Jorge Mancera y Ruíz	Antagonist
2009	Verano de amor	Othón Villalba	Main Antagonist
2009-10	Mar de amor	Guillermo Briceño	Adult Protagonist
2011	La fuerza del destino	Juan Jaime Mondragón	Main Antagonist
2012-13	Qué bonito amor	Justo Martínez de la Garza	Adult Protagonist
2014	Qué pobres tan ricos	Himself	Antogonist
2015	Lo imperdonable	Jorge Prado-Castelo	Adult Protagonist
2016	El hotel de los secretos	Doctor Lazaro Vicario / Doctor Simon Canabal	Antagonist

== Awards and nominations ==
Year	Premio	Category	Telenovela	Result
1988	Premios TVyNovelas	Best Actor	Victoria	Nominated
1991	Premios TVyNovelas	Best Actor	Destiny	Nominated
1993	Premios TVyNovelas	Best Actor	Valeria and Maxmilliano	Nominated
1994	Premios TVyNovelas	Best Actor	Valentina	Nominated
1997	Premios TVyNovelas	Best Outstanding Performance	The flaming torch	Won
1997	Premios TVyNovelas	Best Villain	The flaming torch	Nominated
2006	Premios TVyNovelas	Best Actor	Rebel	Nominated
2011	Premios TVyNovelas	Best Leading Actor	Mar de Amor	Nominated
2013	Premios TVyNovelas	Best Antagonist Actor	The Power of Destiny	Won

== Films ==
- Tajimara (1965)
- Tirando a Gol (1965) (Trying to Score)
- La Muerte es Puntual (1965) (Death is Always on Time)
- La Valentina (1966)
- Los Angeles de Puebla (1966) (Puebla's Angels) as Sonny
- Pedro Paramo (1967) (as Florencio)
- Esclava del Deseo (1968) (Slave of Desire)
- No hay Cruces en el Mar (1968) (There are no Crosses at Sea)
- Corona de Lagrimas, (1968) Crown of Tears
- 5 de chocolate y 1 de fresa) (1968) (5 Chocolate ones and a Strawberry One)
- El Club de los Suicidas (1968) (The Suicidal Ones Club)
- Los Problemas de Mama (1970) (Mom's Problems)
- Mision Cumplida (1970) (Mission Accomplished)
- La montaña sagrada (1973) (The Holy Mountain)
- El Manantial del Molagro (1974) (Miracle Falls)
- Ven Conmigo (1975) (Come With Me) as Guillermo
- De Todos Modos, Juan te Llamas! (1978) (Your Name is Still Juan!)
- Noche de Juerga (1979) (Party Night)
- Misterio (1980)
- Dos y Dos, Cinco (1980) (Two Plus Two:Five)
- Mentiras (1986) (Lies) as Alvaro Ibanez
- Fuera de la ley (1998)
- Cuando las cosas suceden (2007) as De La Rosa
