= Vecinos =

Mexican television series (2005–)

- Genre: Sitcom
- Created by: Eugenio Derbez
- Based on: Aquí no hay quien viva
- Written by: Enrique González; Jorge Garza; Elias Solorio Lara
- Directed by: Jorge Garza
- Starring: César Bono; Eduardo España; Macaria; Mayrín Villanueva; Ana Bertha Espín; Danny Perea; Octavio Ocaña
- Country of origin: Mexico
- Original language: Spanish
- No. of seasons: 21
- No. of episodes: 331 (list of episodes)

Production
- Executive producers: Elias Solorio; Eugenio Derbez; Gustavo Rodriguez
- Producer: Mary Carmen Carrillo
- Running time: 22 min. (Season 1-2,4-); 44 min. (Season 3)
- Production company: TelevisaUnivision

Original release
- Network: Las Estrellas
- Release: July 10, 2005 – present

Related
- Riquísimos, por cierto

Vecinos (English: Neighbors) is a Mexican television series created by Eugenio Derbez, based on Spanish television series Aquí no hay quien viva. It premiered on Las Estrellas on July 10, 2005. The series portrays the life of everyday people in Mexican barrios, where anything can be found — the jealous housewife, the spinster, the strange family, etc. Each episode features the interactions between these peculiar neighbors, where they deal with problems both real and imagined, such as ghosts, treasures, ripoffs, fights, etc.

The series has been renewed for a sixteenth and seventeenth season. The seventeenth season premiered on July 14, 2024. In August 2024, the series was renewed for two more seasons. The eighteenth season premiered on February 23, 2025. The nineteenth season premiered on May 11, 2025. The twentieth season premiered on March 29, 2026.

== Episodes ==
Season	Episodes	Originally released	
Season	Episodes	First released	Last released
1	69	July 10, 2005	February 11, 2007
2	24	March 21, 2007	September 12, 2007
3	13	January 20, 2008	May 11, 2008
4	13	August 28, 2017	November 13, 2017
5	13	March 24, 2019	May 5, 2019
6	13	May 19, 2019	June 30, 2019
7	13	February 16, 2020	March 22, 2020
8	10	April 26, 2020	May 24, 2020
9	16	July 19, 2020	August 23, 2020
10	15	April 4, 2021	May 2, 2021
11	14	June 13, 2021	July 11, 2021
12	10	March 27, 2022	April 17, 2022
13	13	July 3, 2022	July 31, 2022
14	14	March 19, 2023	April 16, 2023
15	14	April 16, 2023	May 21, 2023
16	15	June 9, 2024	July 7, 2024
17	15	July 14, 2024	August 25, 2024
18	11	February 23, 2025	May 4, 2025
19	11	May 11, 2025	July 20, 2025
20	11	March 29, 2026	April 19, 2026
21	11	April 19, 2026	May 3, 2026

== Cast and characters ==
Character	Actor	Season										
Character	Actor	1	2	3	4	5	6	7	8	9	10	11
Frankie Rivers	César Bono	Main	Main	Main	Main	Main		Main	Main	Main	Main	Main
Germán Martínez	Eduardo España	Main	Main	Main	Main	Main	Main	Main	Main	Main	Main	Main
Magdalena Pérez López	Macaria	Main	Main	Main	Main	Main	Main	Main	Main	Main	Main	Main
Don Roque Balboa	Polo Ortín	Main	Main	Main								
Silvia Olvera	Mayrín Villanueva	Main	Main	Main	Main	Main	Main	Main	Main	Main	Main	Main
Lorena Ruiz de Rivers	Ana Bertha Espín	Main	Main	Main	Main	Main	Main	Main	Main	Main	Main	Main
Arturo López	Moisés Suárez	Main	Main	Main	Main	Main	Main	Main	Main	Main	Main	Main
Luis San Román	Darío Ripoll	Main	Main	Main	Main		Main	Main	Main	Main	Main	Main
Pedro Medina	Pablo Valentín	Main	Main	Main	Main	Main	Main	Main	Main	Main	Main	Main
Alejandra López Pérez	Danny Perea	Main	Main	Main	Main	Main	Main	Main	Main	Main	Main	Main
Marco López Pérez	Vadhir Derbez	Main										
Claudia	Tania Vázquez	Main	Recurring	Recurring								
Benito Rivers Ruiz	Octavio Ocaña	Main	Main	Main	Guest	Main	Main	Main	Main	Main	Main	Main
Vanesa Balboa	Roxana Castellanos	Main	Recurring					Main	Main	Main	Main	Main
Jorjais	Manuel "Flaco" Ibáñez	Recurring	Recurring	Main	Main	Main	Main	Main	Main	Main	Main	Main
Yesenia Treviño Pérez "La Yeyis"	Ahrid Hannaley			Main								
Piloto	Luis Gerardo Méndez			Main								
Patricia "Pato" Alcantara	Carla Zuckerman			Main								
Rocko	Markin López				Main	Main	Main	Main	Main	Main	Main	Main
Morrison	Saíd Casab				Main	Main	Main	Main	Main	Main	Main	Main
Jovita	Yolanda Martínez					Main						
Cris	Gina Holguín					Recurring	Main	Main	Main	Main	Main	Main
Liz	Talitha Becker						Recurring	Recurring	Recurring	Recurring	Main	Main
Hipólito Menchaca	Édgar Vivar											Main

Vecinos's season one cast. Top, from left to right: Lorena, Frankie, Magdalena, Arturo Center, from left to right: Claudia, Benito, Silvia, Alejandra, Marco Bottom, from left to right: Germán, Don Roque, Vanesa, Pedro, Luis

=== Main ===
- César Bono as Francisco Ríos "Frankie Rivers": Lorena's husband and Benito's father. He is an ex actor who spends his time writing scripts for movies on a typewriter, though they usually end up being plagiarisms from other films. Francisco has been socially vacant for most of Benito's childhood, as his main focus is on his unrealistic goal of theatrical glory. He mainly spends his bonding moments with Benito rambling about his potential acting career as a young child, with Benito's constant line that he doesn't want to be an actor. He always boasts about his movie "La Toalla del Mojado" (The Wet Man's Towel) as the best thing he has done in his life, although it turns out that it was the only movie in which he acted. Due to his fantasies of great actor, he usually changes his real name to "Frankie Rivers". He is usually abusive with those who help him, and is economically dependent of his wife Lorena and further on in later seasons of his son Benito. He still has some misunderstandings and friction with his neighbors. Luis is the one who usually helps him the most given Luis's considerate and helpful personality. Francisco lives in apartment 101 with his wife and son, and at the end of season 5 he leaves Lorena after an argument but returns in the next season. His main characteristic is that he always mentions the film he starred in by relating a word a neighbor said to something that happened while he was filming the movie.
- Eduardo España as Germán Martínez: He is the building's doorman, responsible for providing security and keeping the building clean, but also for making the neighborhood's coexistence generate a number of conflicts and misunderstandings. Germán spends most of his time playing or lounging around, which is why neighbors yell at him, threaten to get him fired and saying to him that he is the doorman. Although he gets along with most of the neighbors, he is closer with Benito, Pedro and Jorjais, with whom he plays and has fun. His characteristic expression is to correct the word "doorman" with "janitor", as he doesn't likes to be called "doorman".
- Macaria as Magdalena Pérez de Lopez: Arturo's wife and Alejandra and Marcos's mother. She is a presumptuous woman obsessed with the opinions of others about her. She feels desires for greatness and boasts of many goods, money invested abroad, and fine and expensive items, although her husband Arturo or one of the neighbors highlights her true economic situation. Her ideas of harming the neighbors always carry a consequence such as receiving fines, embargoes and teasing from the neighbors when her ideas lose control. Her arrogance is a consequence of being called the most hated in the building. She lives in apartment 301 with her husband Arturo, her daughter Alejandra, her son-in-law Rocko and her grandson Morrison. Her main characteristic is that she says "Don't try to be funny, because you aren't. You are not," when someone, usually Germán or Arturo, make a joke that she considers unfunny. Her grandson eventually picks up on this and says it with her.
- Polo Ortín as Don Roque Balboa: Vanessa's grandfather. He is a retired soldier who still remembers the moments lived in the army. He usually tries to look serious and disciplined, but his clumsiness and lack of sanity is evident, especially when trying to communicate with his plush bear, whom he calls "Rambo." Most neighbors often tease him for his old age, especially Pedro. He always mentions military strategies for everyday family situations. His characteristic is that he is usually accompanied by his Rambo plush bear for any occasion, and he likes to eat campechanas. He lived in apartment 202 with his granddaughter Vanesa. Before the series returned to television, Ortín had died, and therefore Don Roque doesn't appear in season 4, though the first episode paid tribute and was dedicated to him, causing the character to be presumed dead; other than that, he left his plush bear to Pedro according to his will. This would be confirmed when Vanesa returns in season 7 with her grandfather's old things and will to everyone.
- Mayrín Villanueva as Silvia Olvera: She is a single woman obsessed with getting married but showing her parents she can be independent. She works as an ethics teacher in a high school and occasionally gives regularization classes to some children. Since entering the building, she has many problems with most of the neighbors. Despite this, she gets along with Vanesa and Luis, who once showed her how in love he is with her. Although she is sometimes insecure, she is actually beautiful. Her attempts to get a boyfriend always fail because of the personalities of her friends or her neighbors harm them. Her main characteristic is that she has a statue of San Antonio de Padua in her apartment, which is upside down (as a ritual to find love). She lives in apartment 201.
- Ana Bertha Espín as Lorena Ríos de Rivers: Frankie's wife and Benito's mother. She is an optimistic housewife and sometimes stubborn. She is an incredibly gossipy woman, getting the gossip from Germán. Like her husband, she is abusive to those who help, although she goes to the extreme with her son Benito, who enrolls in many commercial catalogs at the place of study or plays like any child. Her father is the one who financially supports the family because Frankie doesn't want to work. She is the only one in the building who is not afraid of Magdalena when facing her personally. Her characteristic is that she always refers to her husband as "Pancho", who corrects her by saying "Frankie, woman, Frankie Rivers!". She lives in apartment 101 with her family.
- Moisés Suárez as Arturo López: Magdalena's husband and Alejandra and Marcos's father. He is a mature man and househusband. He is always ignored when trying to impose his authority or wanting to communicate with his children. Because of his wife, he goes through all kinds of economic troubles (damage due to waste or plans to upset the neighbors). Many of the neighbors make fun of him for being manipulated by Magdalena. Many times it has been proven that Arturo does not earn much money in his work, which is why the López Pérez's are poorer than Germán and Jorjais. His main characteristic is that when he always talks with someone, he uses the phrase "As the chaviza says." He lives in apartment 301 with his wife Magdalena, his daughter Alejandra, his son-in-law Rocko, and his grandson Morrison.
- Darío Ripoll as Luis San Román: He is a seller and promoter of articles. He shares his apartment with his roommate and best friend Pedro, who gives him the nickname "Bipolar". While trying to solve problems with the neighbors, bad things always end up happening to him. He tends to sometimes be neurotic. The neighbors even gossiped about him and Pedro being a gay couple once. Although he usually goes out with many women, he always has a special sense for his neighbor Silvia. Apparently, he is the best income. In addition, he is one of the few sensible and prudent people of the building, along with Silvia, Vanesa and Benito. One of his most notable characteristics is that whenever he gets stressed, he uses his asthma inhaler. He lives in apartment 102 with Pedro.
- Pablo Valentín as Pedro Medina: He is Luis's roommate and best friend since high school. He is a rather idle, unobliged and immature but chill man who deliberately spends his friend's money on food, treats and video games. He always talks about an affair with Luis's sister, which unleashes anger on his friend. He usually plays jokes and nicknames everyone. In the meetings of the neighbors (in multiple occasions), he mocks Don Roque although later he does not like that this one takes revenge. He is Germán and Benito's friend. He lives in apartment 102 with Luis.
- Danny Perea as Alejandra López: Arturo and Magdalena's daughter, Marcos's sister, Rocko's wife and Morrison's mother. She is a gothic girl, anit-social and sometimes intractable, visible in her personality, way of dressing and behaving and musical tastes, especially when she does not respect the authority of her parents. Her imposing character makes no one contradict her. She is convenient as she is the smartest woman in the building. She is the opposite of her brother Marcos. She lives in apartment 301 with her parents Arturo and Magdalena, her husband Rocko and her son Morrison.
- Vadhir Derbez as Marco López: Arturo and Magdalena's son and Alejandra's brother. He is a fresa, haughty, spoiled, silly and gossipy teen, fan of commercial music and attentive to everything that is fashionable. He is very similar to his mother in many ways. He lived in the department 301 with his parents Arturo and Magdalena and his sister Alejandra, until for reasons of study and for modifying with his sister higher qualifications in his academic history, his mother enrolls him in an exchange contest and ends up going to continue studying in Angangueo, Michoacán where his mother also studied.
- Manuel "Flaco" Ibáñez as Jorjais: a homeless, but nonetheless clever man. Jorjais uses pathos to manipulate others into giving him food, money, jobs, etc. His skill, or rather, willingness, to work often overshadows Germán, leading to conflict between the characters. His characteristic is that when someone waves him off, he says "Of course, the rich always humiliating the poor," while sad music plays in the background, but then says something lighthearted relating to the conversation.
- Octavio Ocaña as Benito Ríos: Lorena and Frankie's son. He started as an innocent 7-year-old boy who liked to study and dreamt of being a doctor, but his parents force him to prepare to be an actor and is forced to attend castings, almost always dressed as animals or some character. He is usually the one who humiliates Frankie the most. He is proven to be the most cunning of the building. He is given various nicknames by the neighbors, mostly Germán, whose nicknames mostly relate to Benito's hair and its color. Being the only child in the place, he is very prudent and sensible as are Luis, Silvia and Vanesa. He is a friend of Pedro and Germán. He lives in department 101 with his parents. Due to reasons of study, Benito is enrolled against his will in a school of actors. After the series was renewed, Ocaña returned as a 20-year-old Benito. However, due to Ocaña's unfortunate death, the final episode featuring him was about him not only finally getting accepted into a show, but one he wants to be part of, and leaves home. He called his parents and friends one last time where everyone was giving their final goodbyes and tribute to him, both the charactere and actor.
- Roxana Castellanos as Vanessa Balboa: Don Roque's granddaughter. She is a veterinarian and a hardcore pet lover. She constantly puts animals into her grandfather's apartment without him knowing. She also seems to be a bit slow thinking. Despite this, she is very cheerful and is just as sensible as Luis, Silvia and Benito. Her biggest feature are her jokes that are usually bad or somewhat complex to understand for certain neighbors. She lived in department 202 with her grandfather Roque, although it was never revealed why she stopped appearing in the series. She returns to the building in season 7.
- Ahrid Hannaley as Yesenia "La Yeyis" Treviño: Arturo and Magdalena's niece. Yeyis is a naive but sweet girl who grew in a wealthy household and holds no prejudices. She's invited to live with the Lopez when Marco leaves to study abroad and her parents decide to take an extended vacation. While Alejandra considers her a moron and a nuisance, Yeyis believes them to be best friends. She befriends and eventually starts a relationship with Alejandra's friend and bandmate Piloto, much to Alejandra's annoyance. She lived in apartment 301 with her uncle and aunt Arturo and Magdalena and her cousin Alejandra, and she leaves after her parents take her home.
- Luis Gerardo Méndez as Piloto: Alejandra's friend and bandmate, vocalist for her rock band. Piloto is a dimwitted boy who dresses in punk fashion but is anything but. He befriends Yeyis in a plot to squeeze money out of her but eventually falls for her, going as far as willing to give up his friendship with Alejandra to remain with Yeyis.
- Carla Zuckerman as Patricia "Pato" Alcantara: a mischievous little girl who replaces Benito when he finds a way to run away from home by exploiting a student exchange program. Unlike Benito, Pato isn't forced to go on auditions and instead spends most of her spare time playing pranks on her neighbors, her favorite target being Germán, whom she often frames as culprit of her worst misdeeds.
- Markin López as Rocko: Alejandra's husband and Morrison's father. Like her, he is a gothic boy. He complicates the life of his father-in-law Arturo by not working and being maintained by him. He lives in apartment 301 with his parents-in-law Arturo and Magdalena, his wife Alejandra and his son Morrison.
- Said Casab as Morrison: Alejandra and Rocko's son. He is an intelligent 4-year-old boy who, like his parents, wears black with very striking hairstyles, like a goth child, although he is very involved in issues of technology and social networks. He lives in apartment 301 with his grandparents Arturo and Magdalena and his parents Alejandra and Rocko.
- Yolanda Martínez as Jovita: Luis's mother. She is an old lady who arrives at Luis's apartment in season 5 to bring order, especially to Pedro. She is a very religious woman, and goes to the saints for problems in the building, or to ask for Pedro to bathe or look for work. Months after filming of season 5 ended, Martínez had died.
- Gina Holguín as Cris, Silvia's friend and Pedro's girlfriend.
- Talitha Becker as Liz, Benito's girlfriend.
- Édgar Vivar as Hipólito Menchaca.
- Paola Ferrer as Esmeralda, Cris' twin sister.

=== Recurring and guests ===
- María Prado as Doña Cata "Catita" Balboa, a heavily religious nurse hired by Don Roque's son to take care of him after Vanessa moves out. At first she's somewhat antagonistic towards Don Roque because she's always trying to take away his sweets and talk him out of doing foolish things, but they eventually develop a romantic relationship over their surprisingly similar tastes and hobbies and get married.
- Ian Rubio de la Cerda as Luis "Luisito" San Roman II, a toddler that Luis and Pedro raise together after his mother, Luis' ex-girlfriend, abandons him with them, claiming he's Luis' son. It's eventually discovered that Luisito is in reality the son of his mother's ex-boyfriend Ro and he's taken away from his adoptive father.
- María Rubio as Doña Socorro "Doña Soco", is the owner of the building. Doña Soco is a ruthless businesswoman with no qualms about tossing the neighbors out if it benefits her.
- Pedro Romo as Don Serafio, the local handyman who charges reasonable prices and always does a good job. Don Serafio is often frustrated by the neighbors' willingness to listen to Germán when he claims he could do the same job quicker and for a lower price, and almost always ends up coming back to fix everything when Germán fails miserably.
- Claudia Bollat as Gudelia, Germán's on-and-off girlfriend who works as a maid in a neighboring building.
- Benjamín Rivero as Neto, the handsome and muscular owner of the convenience store next door to the building. Neto often flirts with Silvia, who flirts right back.

== Production ==
When Eugenio Derbez traveled to Spain in 2005, he saw a TV series named Aquí no hay quien viva, which features the same kinds of problems that people have in the barrios. He thought a Mexican remake would be a good idea, so he created Vecinos. In March 2017 it was announced that the series would return for a fourth season. The fourth season premiered on August 28, 2017. The series has been renewed for a fifth season, that premiered on 24 March 2019. In January 2019 executive producer Elias Solorio announced on his Twitter account that filming of the sixth season had begun. Filming of the ninth season began in June 2020.

In January 2023, the series was renewed for fourteenth and fifteenth season. The fourteenth season premiered on March 19, 2023. The fifteenth season premiered on April 16, 2023.

== Awards and nominations ==
=== Premios TVyNovelas ===
Year	Category	Nominated	Result
2006	Best Comedy Program	Eugenio Derbez	Nominated
2007	Best Comedy Program	Eugenio Derbez	Nominated
2008	Best Comedy Program	Eugenio Derbez	Nominated
2018	Best Comedy Program	Elias Solorio	Won
2019	Best Comedy Program	Elias Solorio	Nominated
2020	Best Comedy Program	Elias Solorio	Nominated
2020	Best Actress in a Comedy Series	Mayrín Villanueva	Nominated
2020	Best Actress in a Comedy Series	Macaria	Won
2020	Best Actor in a Comedy Series	Eduardo España	Nominated

== Spin-off ==
On 17 March 2024, it was announced that a spin-off focused on the López Pérez family was in the works for Vix. Riquísimos, por cierto premiered on 7 February 2025.
