= La gata (1970 TV series) =

Mexican telenovela

- Genre: Telenovela; Drama
- Created by: (Original story); Inés Rodena (Adaptation); Estela Calderón
- Directed by: Antulio Jiménez Pons
- Starring: María Rivas; Juan Ferrara; Magda Guzmán; Antonio Raxel; José Gálvez; Sergio Bustamante; Emma Roldán; Norma Lazareno
- Opening theme: Jump to the Villa by John Dankworth and Cleo Laine
- Ending theme: "Yo voy soñando caminos" by Alberto Cortez
- Country of origin: Mexico
- Original language: Spanish

Production
- Producer: Valentín Pimstein
- Production company: Telesistema Mexicano

Original release
- Network: Canal 2
- Release: 1970

Related
- La gata (1968); La gata (2014)

La Gata, is a Mexican telenovela produced by Valentín Pimstein for Teleprogramas Acapulco, SA in 1970. It stars María Rivas and Juan Ferrara. Based on an original story by Inés Rodena and adapted by Estela Calderón.

== Cast ==
Actor (s)	Character
María Rivas	Renata Santa Cruz "La Gata" / Blanquita Denueve
Juan Ferrara	Pablo Martínez Negrete
Magda Guzmán	Leticia "La Jarocha"
José Gálvez	Agustín Martínez Negrete
Ofelia Guilmáin	Lorenza de Martínez Negrete
Antonio Raxel	Fernando Santa Cruz "El Silencioso"
Sergio Bustamante	Mariano Martínez Negrete
Emma Roldán	Doña Tila
Norma Lazareno	Mónica
Andrea López	Elvira Galván
Carlos Cámara	Tilico / Juan Garza
Antonio Medellín	Damián Reyes
Josefina Escobedo	Doña Mercedes
Eduardo Alcaraz	El Francés
Héctor Bonilla	Paris
María Douglas	Amalia
Daniel "Chino" Herrera	Don Chichilo
Emilia Carranza	Bertina
Magda Haller	Eugenia
Irma Lozano	Vickie Suárez
Antonio Bravo	Alfredo Suárez
Jorge del Campo	Pepe "El Gorras"
José Carlos Ruiz	Lupe
Martha Vázquez	Renata (girl)
Fernando Borges	Tilico
Juan Antonio Edwards	Mariano (child)
Enrique del Castillo	Socio de Agustín
