= Simon Says (TV series) =

- Genre: Sitcom
- Created by: Pedro Ortiz de Pinedo
- Written by: Oscar Ortiz de Pinedo; César Ferrón; Pepe Sierra
- Directed by: Fez Noriega; Fernando Canek
- Starring: Arath de la Torre; Nora Salinas; Ricardo Fastlicht; Dalilah Polanco; Sergio Ochoa; Claudia Acosta; Carlos Speitzer; María Chacón
- Country of origin: Mexico
- Original language: Spanish
- No. of seasons: 2
- No. of episodes: 26

Production
- Executive producer: Pedro Ortiz de Pinedo
- Producer: Daniel Rendón
- Running time: 21–24 minutes
- Production company: Televisa

Original release
- Network: Las Estrellas
- Release: 24 July 2018 – 22 October 2019

Simon Says (Spanish: Simón dice) is a Mexican sitcom that premiered on Las Estrellas on 24 July 2018. The series is created and produced by Pedro Ortiz de Pinedo for Televisa. The series stars Arath de la Torre, Nora Salinas, Ricardo Fastlicht, Dalilah Polanco, Sergio Ochoa, Claudia Acosta, Carlos Speitzer, and María Chacón.

The series revolves around a group of unhappily married friends that meet every week to tell stories of furtive conquests and fictitious work achievements. Production of the series began in April 2018. The series has been renewed for a second season, filming began on 12 March 2019. The second season premiered on 30 July 2019.

== Plot ==
Simón (Arath de la Torre), Bartolomé (Sergio Ochoa) and César (Ricardo Fastlicht), are three unhappily married men with dominant women. Every Thursday they meet in a male sanctuary, where they to play cards and tell stories of furtive conquests and work achievements that never happened. Daniel (Carlos Speitzer), newly married, has joined the group and the other members consider him a good candidate to mold the perfect male. Their wives also meet to tell what really happens in their couple's lives, where they are the ones in control.

== Cast ==
- Arath de la Torre as Simón
- Nora Salinas as Diana
- Ricardo Fastlicht as César
- Dalilah Polanco as Beatriz
- Sergio Ochoa as Bartolomé
- Claudia Acosta as Carla
- Carlos Speitzer as Daniel
- María Chacón as Nicole

== Episodes ==
=== Series overview ===
Series	Episodes	Originally released	
Series	Episodes	First released	Last released
1	13	24 July 2018	16 October 2018
2	13	30 July 2019	22 October 2019

=== Season 1 (2018) ===
No. overall	No. in season	Title	Original release date
1	1	"Saca el gato"	24 July 2018
Simon welcomes Daniel to his group and recommends his friends an infallible technique for their wives to take care of them as they should, the problem is that everyone does everything wrong.
2	2	"Sacúdela bien"	31 July 2018
César can not sleep because of the snoring of Beatriz, his wife. Simon gives him advice that will make both of them sleep well.
3	3	"Aplica la persuasiva"	7 August 2018
Daniel is desperate for the new diet prepared by Nicole, his wife. Simón advises to apply a reverse psychology technique with their women, but he ends up being a victim.
4	4	"Marca tu territorio"	14 August 2018
Bartolomé is upset by the new exercise machine that Carla, his wife, has just bought. Simón tells his friends how he got his gameroom, because a male always needs his space and encourages them to "mark their territory", but Bartolomé takes it too literally.
5	5	"Házlo tú mismo"	21 August 2018
Daniel has leaks in his bathroom and he plans to call a professional. Simon tells him that a male who respects himself fixes his own house. Nicole wants to talk to a specialist for her cousin's bachelorette party.
6	6	"No invoques al diablo"	28 August 2018
César will receive the visit of his mother-in-law. Simón tells his friends that there has always been hatred between males and mothers-in-law and recommends that they not accept them at home. César does the impossible to avoid the arrival of his mother-in-law.
7	7	"Hazlo como Negrete"	4 September 2018
Daniel is about to celebrate his first wedding anniversary with Nicole. Simón reminds him that a male should never remember important dates with his wife, as did the men of before, such as Jorge Negrete.
8	8	"Tómate la pastilla"	11 September 2018
Bartolomé has sexuality problems with Carla for several days. Simón recommends taking the blue pill, but without his wife's knowledge. Bartolomé tries to follow Simón's advice, although he does not remember very well how to do it.
9	9	"Toma el control"	18 September 2018
Nicole refuses to have relations with Daniel because she wants to watch her series, Simón recommends buying a universal control to turn off the TV without Nicole realizing it, but it causes more problems.
10	10	"Hazle como que te vas"	25 September 2018
César arrives desperate for not being able to control his wife. Simón indoctrinates him in the old art of telling her that he is going to go so that she implores him to stay. César believes he is doing the right thing, but he is about to commit the worst mistake of his life.
11	11	"Aplícale la castigadora"	2 October 2018
Bartolomé is jealous because his new neighbor is Carla's ex-boyfriend. Simón advises him to communicate with ex-girlfriends in order to give jealousy back to his wife.
12	12	"Como veo doy"	9 October 2018
It is the anniversary of the Thursday of Tornillos and Simón has prepared an epic night, but he forgot that Diana's father will come to dinner that day, and he does not come alone.
13	13	"La casa gana"	16 October 2018
Simón is about to lose his man cave because of his friends. Diana's dad does not appear and to top it off, Lucy turned out to be an alcoholic. Carla, Beatriz and Nicole come to complicate things even more.

=== Season 2 (2019) ===
No. overall	No. in season	Title	Original release date
14	1	"Voltéale la tortilla"	30 July 2019 (Note: Premiered early online through Las Estrellas website on 25 July 2019.)
Simón receives his daughter at home and her boyfriend Emeterio, whom he will keep locked up. Diana convinces her friends that their husbands got drunk for a good cause.
15	2	"Todas mías"	6 August 2019
The man cave is infested with mice, so Simón and the guys go to a coffee shop, where he will reveal his technique to have all the women he wants. Beatriz is obsessed with cleaning her house, so Diana will also go to the coffee shop.
16	3	"Aplícale la dormilona"	13 August 2019
Bartolomé, César and Daniel have to accompany their wives to carry out their activities. Simón will help his friends with one of his techniques so they avoid going with them.
17	4	"Aplícale la lastimera"	20 August 2019
César is proposed to work on an architecture project, but Beatriz warns him that he must continue to do his housework, which is why he asks Simón for help.
18	5	"Aplícale la matadora"	27 August 2019
Bartholomew will celebrate the anniversary of his job and does not plan to take Carla, and Simón gives him advice. In the end things will not work out well.
19	6	"Diana dice"	3 September 2019
Bety plans a weekend with César in Valle de Bravo, but Diana changes those plans, telling the girls how to blackmail their husbands with Victoria Ruffo's crying classes.
20	7	"Feliz cumpleaños"	10 September 2019
The girls forget Bety's birthday, but soon they repair the forgetfulness and they will organize a party in Diana's house. Simón doesn't want his friends to find out who's in charge in his house, so he decides to blackmail Diana by revealing what she did last summer.
21	8	"Gallo gallina"	17 September 2019
Bety defiles César's book of ancestral family recipes. César suffers from this loss and Simón will give him the most appropriate advice so that his wife no longer messes with his things.
22	9	"Aprieta el asterisco"	24 September 2019
The women are worried about their husbands' health and force them to have a prostate exam. Simón boasts and makes fun of his friends, but Diana has prepared a surprise visit for him.
23	10	"Hazle como El Santo"	1 October 2019
Betty complains that César does not defend her. Simón recommends to his friends to defend their honor and territory.
24	11	"Aplícale la ley del hielo"	8 October 2019
Carla takes all Bartolomé's savings to enter a pyramid scheme. Simón recommends him to apply the silent treatment and stop talking to her. Simón and Diana stop talking to each other.
25	12	"Que no se te arrugue"	15 October 2019
Simón's position as an alpha male is in danger from the rebellion of his pack because they are tired of him not letting Ifigenia go down to the man cave. Simón hires Lucy Montes to portray his version of Ifigenia to calm his friends.
26	13	"Parto con dolor"	22 October 2019
Nicole begins to feel labor pains. Everyone is at the hospital, but the doctor tells them it was a false alarm. The one that will actually give birth is Karla.

== Awards and nominations ==
Year	Award	Category	Nominated	Result
2019	TVyNovelas Awards	Best Comedy Program	Pedro Ortiz de Pinedo	Nominated
2020	TVyNovelas Awards	Best Comedy Series	Pedro Ortiz de Pinedo	Nominated
