= Laisha Wilkins =

Mexican actress (born 1976)

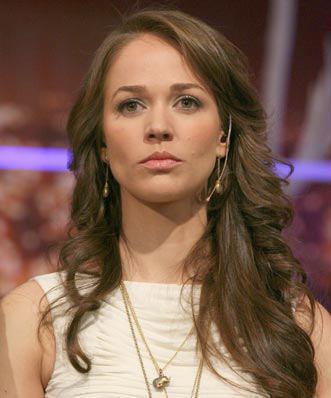
- Born: Laisha Wilkins Pérez; 18 May 1976 (age 49); Mexico City, Mexico
- Occupations: Actress, TV Hostess, producer
- Years active: 1997–present

Laisha Wilkins Pérez (born 18 May 1976) is a Mexican actress, talk show host and producer.

== Biography ==
Born on 18 May 1976, she is the daughter of Federico Wilkins and Susana Pérez. She went to the Centro de Educación Artística (CEA) of Televisa to study acting. Her first television appearances were a number of small roles in the comedy show Otro Rollo with Adal Ramones.

Laisha made her debut in 1997 with the series Mi generacion (My Generation), then eventually went on to appear in a few telenovelas, including Soñadoras, the highly-popular Locura de Amor (Madness of Love), Primer amor... a mil por hora, and Bajo la Misma Piel. Subsequently, she received an opportunity as host in TeleHit video channel. Also, during 2001 and 2002 she participated in several "Mujer, casos de la vida real" chapters.

Apart from acting, Laisha has appeared on several talk shows as a fill-in hostess, most notably on the Miami-based El Gordo y La Flaca. In 2006, she made a performance in the telenovela La fea más bella. In 2007, she made her first foray into film in the movie "Mejor es que Gabriela no se muera".

On 1 January 2008, Laisha started hosting a new show on Televisa's Canal 4, titled Metrópolis. She is set to reprise her role of Lt. Lucia Alvarez in Mujeres Asesinas, but this time she will transform into one of the killers.

That same year Angelli Nesma offered her the role of Constanza in the telenovela Un gancho al corazón. Later, she debuted as co-producer and actress of the 2010 Mexican film Ángel caído, playing the role of Perséfone. Laisha also made a comeback in Corazón Salvaje. In 2011 she returned as an antagonist in La fuerza del destino. In 2013, she participated in special performance in Mentir para vivir. In 2015, she returned as an antagonist in Que te perdone Dios, where Angelli Nesma Medina offered Laisha the role of twin sisters Ximena / Daniela.

== Filmography ==
=== Films ===
Year	Title	Role	Notes
2000	Siganme los buenos	Herself	Television film
2004	Los grandes de Acapulco	Host	Television film
2007	Mejor es que Gabriela no se muera	La Chica del Tiempo	
2010	Ángel caído	Persefone	
2011	Contratiempo	Valeria	
2014	The Zwickys	Erica	

=== Television ===
Year	Title	Role	Notes
1997	Mi pequeña traviesa	Lorena	Supporting Role
1997	Mi generación	Mariana	Supporting Role
1998	Soñadoras	Emilia González	Co-Protagonist
2000	Locura de amor	Rebeca Becerril	Main Antagonist
2000-2002	Mujer, casos de la vida real	Various roles	6 episodes
2001	Primer amor, a mil por hora	Tamara	Supporting Role
2003	Bajo la misma piel	Paula Beltrán Ortiz	Antagonist
2003	Don Francisco Presenta	Herself	CoHost
2006-2007	La fea más bella	Carmina Muñoz	Special Appearance
2008	Mujeres asesinas	Teniente Álvarez	"Sonia, desalmada" (Season 1, Episode 1); "Mónica, acorralada" (Season 1, Episode 2); "Margarita, ponzoñosa" (Season 1, Episode 3); "Jéssica, tóxica" (Season 1, Episode 4); "Martha, asfixiante" (Season 1, Episode 5)
2008-2009	Un gancho al corazón	Constanza Lerdo	Main Antagonist
2009	Corazón salvaje	Constanza Montes de Oca	Supporting Role
2011	La fuerza del destino	Maripaz Lomelí Curiel	Main Antagonist
2013	Mentir para vivir	Inés Valdivia	Special Appearance
2015	Que te perdone Dios	Ximena / Daniela	Antagonist
2016-2017	Tres veces Ana	Jennifer	Supporting Role
2016-2017	La Candidata	Lorena	Recurring Role

=== As producer ===
Year	Title	Role	Notes
2015	Into the Wolf's Den	Executive producer	Pre-production

== Awards and nominations ==
Year	Award	Category	Telenovela	Result
1999	TVyNovelas Awards	Best Female Revelation	Soñadoras	Nominated
2004	TVyNovelas Awards	Best Female Antagonist	Bajo la misma piel	Nominated
2012	TVyNovelas Awards	Best Female Antagonist	La Fuerza del Destino	Nominated
2017	TVyNovelas Awards	Best Supporting Actress	Tres veces Ana	Nominated
