= Los exitosos Pérez =

- Genre: Telenovela
- Based on: Los exitosos Pells by Sebastián Ortega
- Written by: Esther Feldman; Alejandro Maci
- Screenplay by: Sergio Vainman; Alejandro Quesada; Sandra Finkelstain
- Directed by: Benjamín Cann; Alejandro Gamboa
- Creative directors: Sandra Cortés; Zulma Correa
- Starring: Ludwika Paleta; Jaime Camil
- Theme music composer: Aleks Syntek
- Opening theme: "Loca" by Aleks Syntek
- Country of origin: Mexico
- Original language: Spanish
- No. of episodes: 175

Production
- Executive producers: José Alberto Castro; Adrián Santucho
- Producer: Fernando Abadi
- Editor: Guille Gatti
- Camera setup: Multi-camera
- Production company: Televisa

Original release
- Network: Canal de las Estrellas
- Release: August 30, 2009 – April 30, 2010

Related
- Alma de hierro; Locas de amor

Los exitosos Pérez ("The Successful Perezes") is the adaptation for Mexico of the Argentine romantic comedy telenovela Los Exitosos Pells. It's a co-production of Endemol and Telefe. Mexican producer José Alberto Castro acts as it executive producer. With a mixed cast of mostly Mexican and Argentinian actors, and a few from other nationalities, it was filmed on location in Argentina, in exactly the same sets used in the original Argentinian counterpart. It was the last telenovela starred by genre star Verónica Castro.

== Synopsis ==
Martín Pérez (Jaime Camil), an arrogant and manipulative man, is the most popular news anchorman of the country. He has been working for several years in the "Global News" channel, the number 1 news network, and is regarded as the most valuable asset of the channel. He is married with his co-anchor Sol (Ludwika Paleta), and although their marriage is just a publicity stunt, there is a general perception that it became an important factor of their popularity. As a couple they are known as "the successful Perez". Roberta Santos (Verónica Castro), owner of the competing "RS News" network, learns that Martin Perez will soon end his contract with Global News, and secretly makes a job offer to Martin, thinking that bringing him to her channel will tip the ratings in her favor.

Martin Perez tells his intentions to move to the competing network to the owner of Global News, Franco Arana (Rogelio Guerra), who in reaction engages in a heated dispute with the journalist. In a moment of rage, Franco pushes Martin, accidentally knocking him unconscious and leaving him in state of coma. Scared, worried, and believing that he killed the most famous man of the country, he leaves care of the situation to his right hand, Amanda Olivera (Paty Díaz) and leaves his office.

Coincidentally, during transit to his home, his car runs over Gonzalo Gonzalez (Jaime Camil), an actor and drama teacher who is physically almost identical to Martin, and Franco asks Gonzalo to supplant Martin in exchange of a large sum of money. Gonzalo accepts, pressed for a second mortgage, and after signing a contract that neither he nor his manager had read, he begins to replace Perez.

Gonzalo, with his new life as Martin discovers that the Perezes are a couple only in front of the cameras and in public appearances, but in private they have separated lives. Martin is gay and his partner is Tomas Arana (José Ron), son of the owner of the channel, while Sol (Ludwika Paleta) is having an affair with Diego Planes (Marco Méndez), a chronicler of Global News. Meanwhile, Roberta Santos puzzled by Martin's unexpected change of heart sets her mind to uncovering the secrets that the Perezes are hiding, with the help of her personal assistant José (Gastón Ricaud), and her ultimate goal of bringing Martin to her network.

Gonzalo has to comply with his contract and avoid blowing up his cover as Martin at all extents even before Martin's gay partner Tomas. In the meantime, Gonzalo falls in love with Sol, but finds it impossible to approach her, because she has many resentments against Martin. Over time he has to struggle with his feelings toward Sol while maintaining appearances and covering himself from the suspicions of others, especially Roberta Santos', until the day that the real Martin Perez would wake out of the coma.

== Cast ==
- Verónica Castro - Roberta Santos
- Rogelio Guerra - Franco Arana
- Ludwika Paleta - Soledad "Sol" Duarte de Pérez
- Jaime Camil - Martín Pérez / Gonzalo González
- José Ron - Tomás Arana
- Paty Díaz - Amanda Olivera
- Marco Méndez - Diego Planes
- Macaria - Rebeca Ramos
- Ana Martín - Renata Manzilla de la Cruz
- Susana González - Alessandra Rinaldi
- Víctor Laplace - Alfonso Duarte
- Tomy Dunster - Gonzalo Amor
- Mike Amigorena - Adrián Bravo
- África Zavala - Liliana Cortéz
- Dalilah Polanco - Daniela
- Pablo Valentín - Sergio Méndez
- Gastón Ricaud - Joséfo
- Mauricio Mejía - Charlie Díaz
- Iván Espeche - Ricardo
- David Chocarro - Nacho
- Santiago Ríos - Álvaro Chávez
- Gisela Van Lacke - Lola
