= Octavio Ocaña =

Mexican actor (1998–2021)

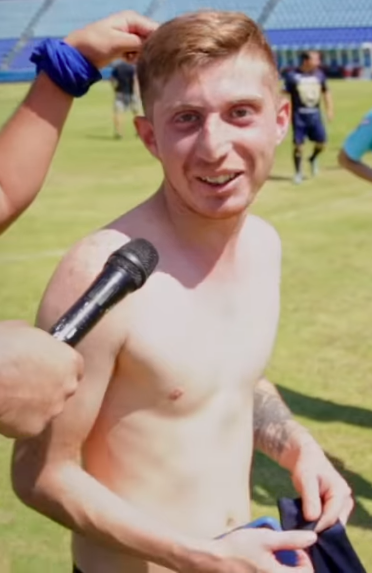
- Ocaña in February 2021
- Born: Octavio Augusto Pérez Ocaña; 7 November 1998; Villahermosa, Tabasco, Mexico
- Died: 29 October 2021 (aged 22); Cuautitlán Izcalli, State of Mexico, Mexico
- Cause of death: Gunshot wound to the head
- Burial place: Recinto Memorial of Villahermosa
- Occupation: Actor

Octavio Augusto Pérez Ocaña (7 November 1998 – 29 October 2021) was a Mexican actor known for his role of Benito in the television series Vecinos.

He began his career in the program Chabelo, in a section called Chiquillos y Chiquillas. He also participated in Lola...Érase una vez, and the Mexican film Amor letra por letra.

== Murder ==
On the morning of 29 October 2021, Ocaña was shot to death at the age of 22 on a highway of Cuautitlán Izcalli, State of Mexico. The reason he was shot is under investigation. According to the prosecutor's initial investigation, Ocaña was driving a Jeep Cherokee on the streets of the municipality and was accompanied by two subjects who were later identified as friends of his father. The local police requested him to stop but Ocaña ignored them. During the pursuit, Ocaña collided with several vehicles and later entered the Chamapa-Lechería highway. At some point, according to the investigation, Ocaña grabbed a gun and accidentally shot himself in the chin. Witnesses claim otherwise stating that police shot at him and planted the gun in his right hand while he was left handed. He died en route to the hospital. It is speculated that the state police had ulterior motives to be stopping Octavio and that he was murdered by the police who later staged the act as a suicide. Onsite reports show that he was not immediately called an ambulance after being shot. Video evidence shows that he was still alive long after the police stopped him and he suffered on the side of the road. Follow-up by the government is in progress to investigate corruption and issues with the original police story given which is inconsistent with video evidence available.

== Filmography ==
Film
Year	Film	Role	Notes
2008	Amor letra por letra	Gaspar	
Television
Year	Title	Role	Notes
2005–2021	Vecinos	Benito Ríos / Benito Rivers	
2007	Lola...Érase una vez	Otto Von Ferdinand	
2007	La familia P. Luche	Benito	Guest appearance
2009	Hermanos y detectives	Lorenzo Montero	
2020	Te doy la vida	Benito Rangel	
2020	La mexicana y el güero	Sr. Cruz	
