= Pablo Valentín =

Mexican actor

- Born: July 13, 1972 (age 53); Guadalajara, Jalisco, Mexico
- Occupation: Actor

Javier Ailec Paulino Duarte de Arrazabal (born July 13, 1972), known professionally as Pablo Valentín is a theater, film and television actor best known for his role as Pedro in Vecinos.

== Early life ==
Born in Guadalajara, Jalisco, Mexico, Valentín has appeared in telenovelas such as The Color of Passion, Vecinos, and Por ella soy Eva. Valentín is married to Mariana Treviño and has three children. He is one of three children, his sister is Indra Duarte and his brother is Eduardo Toscano.

== Career ==
Valentín made his debut in theater at the age of 14 in El príncipe de las hadas (The Prince of Fairies). His father is a theater director and acting teacher and encouraged him to join the theater. He has stated that working in theater is like "going home" but sees himself as a "melodramatic actor". His father was a theater director. In 2001 he made his television debut in La familia P. Luche.

In 2012 he joined the cast of the comedy telenovela Por ella soy Eva as Fernando Contreras, a macho character that results in his downfall as he tries to maintain his role as the man of the house while his character's wife's career is rising. Valentín worked alongside Jaime Camil, Lucero (entertainer) and Carlos de la Mota in the series. He participated in The Color of Passion with Erick Elías, Helena Rojo and René Strickler as Mario Hernández in 2014.

Valentín took on the role of Abel Cruces in the TV series Yago in 2016, a role that he enjoyed because he found his character interesting. The series revealed his character's nuances in fragments through flashbacks, which explained the character's attitude.

In 2017, he participated in the production of Un Fantasma en el Espejo (The Ghost in the Mirror) in Guadalajara, Mexico, a show that one news outlet said it would "make you tremble with fear".

Also in 2017, Valentín took to the stage with Violeta Isfel after the performance of the whodunit La estética del crimen (The Aesthetics of Crime) in Mexico City to count and announce the audience votes. During the performance the audience had the opportunity to decide and vote on who they thought was the culprit. Valentín and Isfel also announced their upcoming performance, Las mujeres son de Venus y los hombres ni madres (Women are from Venus and men are not).

== Filmography ==
Film roles
Year	Title	Roles	Notes
2015	Ladronas de almas	Capitán Arroyo	

Television roles
Year	Title	Roles	Notes
2004	Hospital el paisa	Enfermesero	22 episodes
2005–2017	Vecinos	Pedro Medina	119 episodes
2006	Mujer, casos de la vida real	Unknown role	7 episodes
2007	RBD: La familia	Gustavo	2 episodes
2008	Mujeres asesinas	Forense DIEM	Episode: "Claudia, cuchillera"
2008–2009	Un gancho al corazón	Tano Rodríguez	Main cast; 219 episodes
2008	Sexo y otros secretos	Suicida	2 episodes
2009	Sortilegio	Delegado	Episode: "Destrucción"
2009	Los simuladores	Unknown role	5 episodes
2009–2010	Los exitosos Pérez	Sergio Méndez	Main cast; 74 episodes
2010–2011	Para volver a amar	Marcial	Main cast; 146 episodes
2011–2017	Como dice el dicho	Various roles	5 episodes
2011	La fuerza del destino	Unknown role	3 episodes
2012	Por ella soy Eva	Fernando Contreras	Main cast; 164 episodes
2013	Nueva vida	Martín	Episode: "Voy a ser madre"
2014	The Color of Passion	Mario	Main cast; 81 episodes
2015	La rosa de Guadalupe	Agente Cataño	Episode: "La ambición"
2015–2016	Antes muerta que Lichita	Gumaro	Main cast; 130 episodes
2016	Yago	Abel	Main role; 64 episodes
2018–2019	Por amar sin ley	Benjamin Acosta	Main role (season 1); 92 episodes; and Special guest role (season 2); 91 episodes
2020	Vencer el miedo	Tulio Menéndez	Main cast; 47 episodes
2020–2021	La mexicana y el güero	Luis	Main cast; 127 episodes
2022	Amor dividido	Picasso	Main cast
2022	Corazón guerrero	Valero	Main cast
2023	Eternamente amándonos	Óscar	Recurring role
2024	Tu vida es mi vida	Marcos Balam	Main cast

=== Stage ===
- Barataria: Estado de México - 2018
- El fantasma en el espejo (The Ghost in the Mirror) - 2017
- Festival Internacional Cervantino - 2016
- Marido en venta - 2012

== Awards and nominations ==
Year	Award	Category	Recipient	Result	Ref.
2013	31st TVyNovelas Awards	Best Supporting Actor	Por ella soy Eva	Nominated	
2015	33rd TVyNovelas Awards	Best Co-lead Actor	The Color of Passion	Nominated	
2016	34th TVyNovelas Awards	Best Co-lead Actor	Antes muerta que Lichita	Nominated	
