= Concierto de almas (TV series) =

Mexican telenovela

- Genre: Telenovela
- Country of origin: Mexico
- Original language: Spanish

Original release
- Network: Telesistema Mexicano

Concierto de almas, is a Mexican telenovela produced by Televisa and originally transmitted by Telesistema Mexicano.

== Cast ==
- Marga López
- Germán Robles
- Juan Ferrara
- Erna Martha Bauman
