= La fuerza del destino (TV series) =

- Genre: Telenovela
- Created by: María Zarattini
- Written by: María Zarattini; Claudia Velazco
- Directed by: Benjamín Cann; José Ángel García
- Creative director: Florencio Zavala
- Starring: David Zepeda; Sandra Echeverría; Gabriel Soto; Laisha Wilkins; Juan Ferrara; Alejandro Tommasi
- Opening theme: "La fuerza del destino" performed by Sandra Echeverría and Marc Anthony
- Country of origin: Mexico
- Original language: Spanish
- No. of episodes: 101

Production
- Executive producer: Rosy Ocampo
- Producer: Eduardo Meza
- Cinematography: Alejandro Álvarez; Daniel Ferrer
- Editor: Alfredo Juárez
- Camera setup: Multi-camera

Original release
- Network: Canal de las Estrellas
- Release: 14 March – 31 July 2011

La fuerza del destino (English title: The Power of Destiny) is an original Mexican telenovela produced by Rosy Ocampo for Televisa that aired on Canal de las Estrellas from 14 March – 31 July 2011. In the United States, it aired on Univision from 2 August – 26 December 2011.

Starring David Zepeda, Sandra Echeverría, Gabriel Soto, Laisha Wilkins, Juan Ferrara and Alejandro Tommasi.

This was the last acting credit for Pedro Armendáriz, who died shortly after completing filming for the series.

== Plot ==
This story begins when 14-year-old Iván (David Zepeda) returns with his mother, Alicia (Leticia Calderón), to the land of his birth: Álamos, Sonora. There, lives his father, Juan Jaime Mondragón (Juan Ferrara), a wealthy and powerful businessman and farmer who doesn't recognize him as his son and who rejects and threatens them.

Alicia, who keeps a secret about her origins, is forced to accept a job as a cook in the home of the Lomelí Curiel family, where, in addition to Doña Carlota (Delia Casanova), her daughter, Lucrecia (Rosa María Bianchi), and her son-in-law, Gerardo (Alejandro Tommasi), two girls live: the teenager Maripaz (Laisha Wilkins) and little Lucía (Sandra Echeverría).

In the home of this wealthy family, Iván helps out in any way he can and, thanks to his intelligence, continues his studies, with Doña Carlota's generous help, until he turns 19. At the same time, 18-year-old Maripaz returns from studying abroad. Iván is attracted to the flirtatious young woman, and she, frivolous and capricious, decides to seduce him for fun and, without considering the consequences, becomes pregnant by him.

The scandal in the family is enormous; to the point that Lucrecia, Maripaz's stern mother, a woman obsessed with appearances, orders the young man to be beaten. During the brawl, one of the gang members dies, and Iván is led to believe he is responsible. With everything against him and nothing left to lose, he decides, filled with rage and helplessness, to cross illegally into the United States.

It is in Los Angeles, California, where he will live for eleven years and where he meets Anthony McGuire (Pedro Armendáriz), who will become his protector, adopt him, and motivate him to return to Mexico, not only to do business now that he is a professional, but also to face his past.

There are many intrigues and surprises that Iván will discover when he returns to Sonora; among them, the fact that the son he conceived with Maripaz mysteriously disappeared the same day he was born, and his whereabouts are unknown.

A key moments will be the confession of Lucía, Maripaz's younger sister, a young psychologist full of virtues who has secretly loved him since she was a child, which he had not known.

Together, Iván and Lucía will discover the value of loyalty, honesty, and truth, and will find love thanks to The Power of Destiny.

== Cast ==
=== Main ===
- David Zepeda as Iván
- Sandra Echeverría as Lucía
- Gabriel Soto as Camilo
- Laisha Wilkins as Maripaz
- Juan Ferrara as Juan Jaime
- Alejandro Tommasi as Gerardo

=== Recurring and guest stars ===
- Pedro Armendáriz as Anthony
- Delia Casanova as Carlota
- Rosa María Bianchi as Lucrecia
- Leticia Perdigón as Arcelia
- Kika Edgar as Carolina
- Marcelo Córdoba as Antolín
- Ferdinando Valencia as Saúl
- Lucero Lander as Esther
- Yuliana Peniche as Carmen
- Jaume Mateu as David
- Roxana Rojo de la Vega as Judith
- Rosángela Balbó as Olga
- Alfonso Iturralde as Silvestre
- Leticia Calderón as Alicia
- Ignacio Guadalupe as Benito
- Willebaldo López as Cleto
- María Prado as Gloria
- Joana Brito as Eduviges
- Fernando Robles as Leandro
- José Montini as "El Gordo"
- Diego Velázquez as Álex
- Evelyn Zavala as Lichita

== Reception ==
The final episode reached 22.6 rating points during its first broadcast in Mexico. In the United States, the final episode aired on 26 December 2011 and was watched by 6.2 million viewers, becoming the most watched program regardless of language.

== Awards and nominations ==
| Year | Award | Category | Recipient | Result |
|---|---|---|---|---|
| 2011 | People en Español Awards | Best Telenovela | La fuerza del destino | Nominated |
| 2011 | People en Español Awards | Best Actress | Sandra Echeverría | Nominated |
| 2011 | People en Español Awards | Best Actor | David Zepeda | Nominated |
| 2011 | People en Español Awards | Best Supporting Actress | Delia Casanova | Won |
| 2011 | People en Español Awards | Best Supporting Actor | Ferdinando Valencia | Nominated |
| 2011 | People en Español Awards | Best Villain | Laisha Wilkins | Nominated |
| 2011 | People en Español Awards | Best Couple | Sandra Echeverría; David Zepeda | Nominated |
| 2011 | TV Adicto Golden Awards | Best Special Performance | Leticia Calderón | Won |
| 2011 | TV Adicto Golden Awards | Posthumous Tribute | Pedro Armendáriz | Won |
| 2011 | TV Adicto Golden Awards | Best Original Story | La fuerza del destino | Won |
| 2011 | TV Adicto Golden Awards | Best Female Character | Carlota (Delia Casanova) | Won |
| 2011 | TV Adicto Golden Awards | Best National Locations | La fuerza del destino | Won |
| 2012 | TVyNovelas Awards | Best Telenovela | Rosy Ocampo | Won |
| 2012 | TVyNovelas Awards | Best Actress | Sandra Echeverría | Won |
| 2012 | TVyNovelas Awards | Best Actor | David Zepeda | Nominated |
| 2012 | TVyNovelas Awards | Best Antagonist Actress | Laisha Wilkins | Nominated |
| 2012 | TVyNovelas Awards | Best Antagonist Actor | Juan Ferrara | Won |
| 2012 | TVyNovelas Awards | Best Leading Actress | Delia Casanova | Won |
| 2012 | TVyNovelas Awards | Best Musical Theme | "La fuerza del destino" by Sandra Echeverría and Marc Anthony | Nominated |
| 2012 | TVyNovelas Awards | Best Original Story or Adaptation | María Zarattini; Claudia Velazco | Won |
| 2012 | Bravo Awards | Best Telenovela | Rosy Ocampo | Won |
| 2012 | Bravo Awards | Best Screenplay | María Zarattini | Won |
| 2012 | Latin ACE Awards | Best Soap | La fuerza del destino | Won |
| 2012 | Latin ACE Awards | Best Character Actress | Delia Casanova | Won |
| 2012 | Juventud Awards | Girl of my Dreams | Sandra Echeverría | Nominated |
| 2012 | Juventud Awards | Best Telenovela Theme | "La fuerza del destino" by Sandra Echeverría and Marc Anthony | Nominated |
| 2012 | Oye! Awards | Theme Song from a Telenovela, Series, or Movie in Spanish | "La fuerza del destino" by Sandra Echeverría and Marc Anthony | Nominated |
