= Macaria (actress) =

Mexican actress

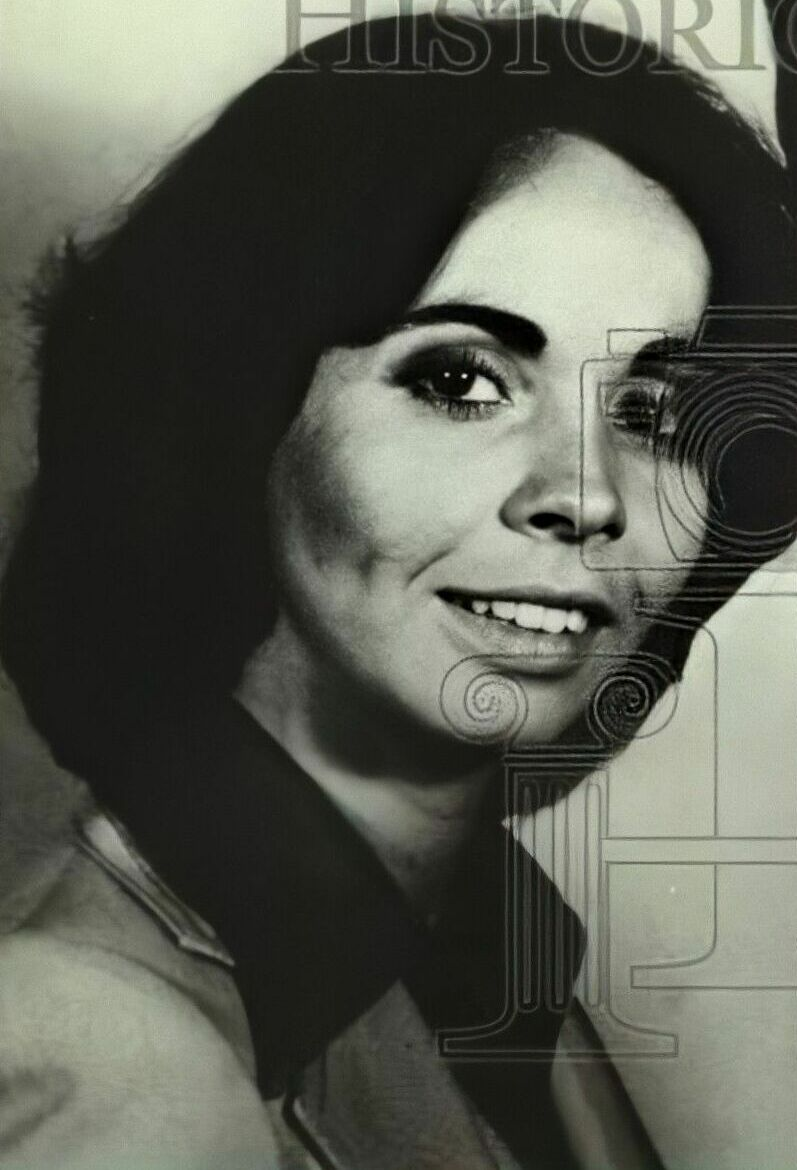
- Macaria in 1978
- Born: Delia Beatriz De la Cruz Delgado; December 20, 1949 (age 76); Mexico City, Mexico
- Occupation: Actress
- Years active: 1969–present

Delia Beatriz De la Cruz Delgado (born December 20, 1949), known professionally as Macaria, is a Mexican actress.

== Biography ==
Delia De la Cruz was born in Mexico City. When she was one year old, her mother took her to Havana, Cuba, where she was raised by her grandparents until her mother brought her back to Mexico at age six. In school she initially studied teaching, before changing focus to dancing and singing. She adopted the stage name Macaria after originating a character with that name on the television program Happening a go go.

She has acted in numerous telenovelas, TV programs, films, and plays, including the sitcom Vecinos and the telenovela Un gancho al corazón.

She has had romantic relationships with guitarist Javier Bátiz, entertainer Gualberto Castro, and comedian Polo Polo. Bátiz is the father of her son, whom she raised along with Gualberto Castro.

== Filmography ==
=== Television ===
- Amor sublime (1967)
- Entre brumas (1973) – Doris
- Ladronzuela (1978) – Perlita
- No tienes derecho a juzgarme (1979)
- Vamos juntos (1979) – María Elena
- Pelusita (1980) – Pelusita
- Chespirito (1980) – Silvia
- Juegos del destino (1981) – Hilda
- Déjame vivir (1982) – Yolanda
- Dos mujeres en mi casa (1984) – Macaria
- Juana Iris (1985) – Elisa
- Encadenados (1988) – Isabel
- Atrapada (1991) – Rita
- Tenías que ser tú (1993) – Dolores de Beltrán
- El secreto de Alejandra (1997) – Elvira
- ¿Qué nos pasa? (1998)
- Nunca te olvidaré (1999) – Berenice Cordero
- DKDA: Sueños de juventud (1999) – Prudencia Rincón
- Cuento de Navidad (1999) – Lamberta
- El precio de tu amor (2000) – Adelina
- Navidad sin fin (2001) – Angelita
- Atrévete a olvidarme (2001) – Hanna Rivas Montaño
- Mujer, Casos de la Vida Real (2001–2005)
- La Otra (2002) – Fátima de Salazar
- Clap, el lugar de tus sueños (2003) – Lucía
- Amarte es mi Pecado (2004) – Dr. Clara Santacruz
- Bajo el mismo techo (2005) – Francisca Murillo
- Vecinos (2005–2008; 2017–present) – Magdalena Pérez López
- Bailando por la boda de mis sueños (2006) – Contestant
- Tormenta en el paraíso (2007–2008) – Paloma Martínez
- Un gancho al corazón (2008–2009) – Isabel López
- Ellas son... la alegría del hogar (2009)
- Los exitosos Pérez (2009–2010) – Rebeca Ramos
- Amorcito corazón (2011–2012) – Hortensia Tres Palacios de Ballesteros
- La familia P. Luche (2012) – Manuel's mother
- Por siempre mi amor (2013–2014) – Minerva Gutiérrez
- Yo no creo en los hombres (2014–2015) – Esperanza Garza Vda. de Morales
- Antes muerta que Lichita (2015–2016) – Fátima García
- Por amar sin ley (2018) – Marcia Muñíz
- Y mañana será otro día (2018) – Mercedes Garza
- Como dice el dicho (2017) – Doña Martha
- Riquísimos, por cierto (2025) – Magdalena Pérez López

=== Films ===
- Paula (1969)
- Las Pirañas aman en Cuaresma (1969)
- Matrimonio y sexo (1970)
- Paraíso (1970) – Chabelita
- Apolinar (1972)
- La fuerza inútil (1972)
- Mi niño Tizoc (1972) – Soledad Flores
- Las mansiones de la locura (1973)
- El monasterio de los buitres (1973)
- Los leones del ring (1974) – Alicia
- Los leones del ring contra la Cosa Nostra (1974) – Alicia Ballesteros
- La disputa (1974)
- El guerrillero del norte (1983)
- Ciudad de ciegos (1991) – Mara

=== Theater ===
- Grease (1973)
- Aggiungi un posto a tavola (1977)
- West Side Story (1977)
- Están tocando nuestra canción (1981)
- Barnum (1987)
- Entre mujeres (1993)
- Anita la huerfanita (2006)
- Chiquita pero picosa (2008)
- La muchacha sin retorno (2008)
- Toc Toc (2010)

== Awards and nominations ==
- 33rd TVyNovelas Awards (2015) - nominated for Best Co-lead Actress
