= List of Grupo Imagen telenovelas and series =

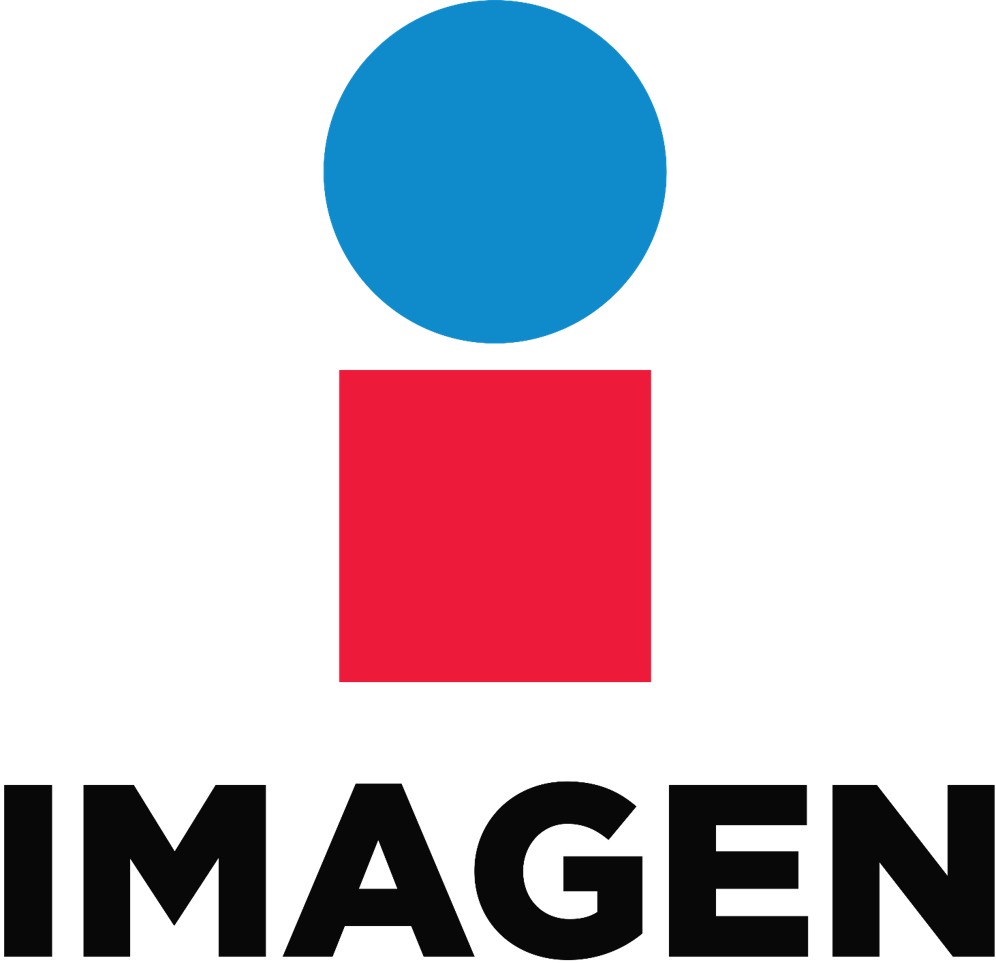

This is a list of telenovelas and dramatic series produced by Grupo Imagen, which from 2010 to 2015 were broadcast 13 productions in Cadenatres, under the concept of "Originales de Cadenatres" (Cadenatres Originals), and from 2016 to date, the rest since the start of transmissions in his succession channel, Imagen Televisión.

== List ==
=== 2010s ===
#	Year	Name	No. Episodes	First/last aired	Director	Executive producer	Ref.
as Cadenatres
1	2010	Las Aparicio	120	15 April – 15 October 2010	Leticia López Margalli; Verónica Bellver	Daniel Camhi	
2	2011	El Sexo Débil	120	7 February – 24 July 2011	Joaquín Guerrero Casasola	Daniel Camhi	
3	2011	Bienvenida realidad	120	14 March – 28 August 2011	Ricardo Álvarez Canales	Gabriela Valentán	
4	2011	El octavo mandamiento	130	8 August 2011 – 12 February 2012	Epigmenio Ibarra; Laura Sosa	Carlos Resendi	
5	2012	Infames	130	13 February – 12 August 2012	Daniela Gálvez	Daniel Camhi	
6	2012	El Albergue	140	12 March – 23 September 2012	Gustavo Loza		
7	2012	La ruta blanca	92	13 August – 16 December 2012	Cristina Palacios	Juan Carlos Villamizar	
8	2012	La clínica	120	24 September 2012 – 8 March 2013	Gustavo Loza		
9	2013	Dulce amargo	120	14 January – 28 August 2013	Iris Dubs	Juan Pablo Zamora	
10	2013	Fortuna	130	22 April – 18 October 2013	Epigmenio Ibarra; Rodrigo Ordóñez	Carlos Resendi	
11	2013	Las trampas del deseo	120	21 October 2013 – 4 April 2014	Verónica Velasco	Rocío Barajas	
12	2014	Amor sin reserva	136	6 October 2014 – 18 April 2015	Luis Fernando Zepeda	Tito Navarro	
13	2015	Nora	76	15 June – 4 October 2015	Ibsen Martínez	Igor Manrique	
as Imagen Televisión
14	2016	Vuelve temprano	100	17 October 2016 – 28 February 2017	Verónica Bellver; Joaquín Guerrero Casasola	Carlos Resendi	
15	2016	Perseguidos	60	7 November 2016 – 27 January 2017	Gustavo Bolívar	Horacio Díaz Morales	
16	2017	Paquita la del Barrio	74	25 April – 4 August 2017	Larissa Andrade; Fernanda Eguiarte	Carlos Rueda; Marcel Ferrer	
17	2017	El capitán	30	7 August – 15 September 2017	Juan Camilo Ferrand	Perla Martínez Legorreta	
18	2017	Muy padres	98	18 September 2017 – 5 February 2018	Bethel Flores	Agustín Restrepo	
19	2018	Atrapada	60	3 September – 23 November 2018	Joaquín Górriz; Roberto Jiménez	Marcel Ferrer	
20	2018	La Taxista	80	17 September – 10 January 2019	Gabriela Rodríguez	Agustín Restrepo	
21	2019	La Guzmán	59	21 January – 11 April 2019	Fernanda Eguiarte; Larissa Andrade	Andrés Santamaría	
22	2019	Un poquito tuyo	79	25 February – 17 June 2019	Rossana Negrín	Agustín Restrepo	
