= El octavo mandamiento =

Mexican telenovela

- Genre: Telenovela
- Created by: Laura Sosa; Epigmenio Ibarra
- Written by: Fernando Ábrego; Diana Cardozo; Alejandro Gerber; Alejandra Olvera; Tania Tinajero; Marcelo Tobar
- Directed by: Rodrigo Curiel; José Luis García Agraz
- Creative director: Ana Magis
- Starring: Saúl Lisazo; Sara Maldonado; Leticia Huijara; Erik Hayser; Ximena Rubio
- Music by: Pedro Mata
- Country of origin: Mexico
- Original language: Spanish
- No. of seasons: 1
- No. of episodes: 130

Production
- Executive producer: Carlos Resendi
- Producers: Ana Urquidi; Epigmenio Ibarra; Carlos Payán
- Production locations: New York City, New York, USA; Mexico City, Distrito Federal, Mexico
- Cinematography: Luis Ávila
- Editor: Horacio Valle
- Camera setup: Multi-camera
- Production company: Argos Comunicación

Original release
- Network: Cadenatres
- Release: 8 August 2011 – 12 February 2012

Related
- El sexo débil; Infames

El octavo mandamiento is a Mexican telenovela that premiered on Cadenatres on 8 August 2011, and concluded on 12 February 2012. The telenovela is created by Laura Sosa and Epigmenio Ibarra, and produced by Argos Comunicación for Cadenatres. It stars Saúl Lisazo, Sara Maldonado, Leticia Huijara, Erik Hayser, and Ximena Rubio.

== Plot ==
The telenovela tells the real situation that thousands of families lived on that fateful September 11 that changed the history of humanity. The plot begins ten years ago with a happy family: a couple with three small children. The woman will be in one of the twin towers of New York at the time of the fatal terrorist act and will become one of the many disappeared, whose body was never recovered. Ten years later, one of his daughters (Sara Maldonado) will live passionate and filial loves, learn love as a couple, relearn to be a daughter and bet on the love of journalism, an occupation that will bring risks and personal dilemmas and with which she will live to fight and denounce terrorism.

== Cast ==
=== Starring ===
- Saúl Lisazo as Julián San Millán
- Sara Maldonado as Camila San Millán
- Leticia Huijara as Isabel San Millán
- Erik Hayser as Diego San Millán
- Ximena Rubio as Sofía Rocha

=== Also starring ===
- Alejandra Ambrosi as Julia San Millán
- Arap Bethke as Iván Acosta
- Marco Pérez as Mauricio Álvarez
- Néstor Rodulfo as Pablo Ortíz
- Claudia Ríos as María Flores
- Mario Loría as Facundo Ramírez
- Tamara Mazarraza as Renata García del Bosque
- René García as Augusto Medina
- Constantino Costas as Ignacio Vargas Salcedo

=== Recurring ===
- Patricio Sebastián as Andrés San Millán
- Aldo Gallardo as Ezequiel Cruz
- Alejandro Caso as Ascencio Frías / El Culiacán
- Juan Martín Jauregui as Javier
- Itahisa Machado as Yadira Escalante
- Eréndira Ibarra as Casilda Barreiro
- Shalim Ortiz as Iñaki Arriaga

== Spin-off ==
The following day after concluding the telenovela, on February 13 a spin-off of the telenovela entitled Infames was released. The spin-off would star Vanessa Guzmán, Luis Roberto Guzmán, Miguel Ángel Muñoz, and Ximena Herrera, with Lisette Morelos, and Eréndira Ibarra as co-stars.
