= Entre el amor y el odio =

Television series

- Genre: Telenovela; Romance; Drama
- Created by: Hilda Morales de Allouis
- Written by: Liliana Abud; Jaime García Estrada; Orlando Merino; Dolores Ortega
- Directed by: Miguel Córcega; Édgar Ramírez
- Starring: Susana González; César Évora; Sabine Moussier; Alberto Estrella; María Sorté; Carmen Salinas; Marga López
- Opening theme: Entre el amor y el odio by Ángel López
- Country of origin: Mexico
- Original language: Spanish
- No. of episodes: 124

Production
- Executive producer: Salvador Mejía Alejandre
- Producer: Nathalie Lartilleux
- Production locations: Filming; Televisa San Ángel; Mexico City, Mexico
- Editors: Marco Antonio Rocha; Alberto Frutos Maza
- Camera setup: Multi-camera
- Running time: 41-44 minutes
- Production company: Televisa

Original release
- Network: Canal de las Estrellas
- Release: February 11 – August 2, 2002

Entre el Amor y el Odio (English: Between Love and Hatred) is a Mexican telenovela produced by Salvador Mejía Alejandre for Televisa in 2002. It is based on the radionovela Cadena de odio by Hilda Morales de Allouis. It aired on Canal de las Estrellas from Monday, February 11, 2002 to Friday, August 2, 2002.

The series stars Susana González, César Évora, Sabine Moussier, María Sorté, Carmen Salinas and Marga López.

== Plot ==
After a long absence, Octavio Villarreal (César Évora) returns to Guanajuato in order to see his uncle Fernando (Joaquín Cordero), who is on his deathbed.

Octavio always considered his uncle to be like a father until Fernando prevented him from marrying Frida (Sabine Moussier). Since that day Octavio has only felt resentment towards Fernando. Octavio heads for the Villarreal mansion in his car with Marcial (Alberto Estrella), a trusted employee of Fernando, when they are intercepted by a girl on a horse.

Octavio is taken with the young woman's beauty, but the contemptuous Marcial tells him that Ana Cristina (Susana González) is Fernando's lover. This is a lie, however; Fernando has only protected the girl who lives on the Villarreal grounds with her supposed grandfather, Manuel (Miguel Corcega).

Fernando dies in Ana Cristina's arms, confessing to her that the love of his life was a woman named Leonela. Upon seeing his uncle's body, Octavio remembers the love they had and takes out his pain and frustration on Ana Cristina, calling her a whore.

However, Fernando's will stipulates that his nephew and his protégée will inherit his shoe factory, but only if they marry and live together for a year. The corrupt Marcial goes to Miami to find the ambitious Frida, who renews her relationship with Octavio even though he has married Ana Cristina.

Marcial and Frida want to take over the factory and conspire so that this marriage does not last any longer than necessary, sowing doubts in Octavio's heart about the purity and good intentions of his wife. Although Octavio loves Ana Cristina, his doubts lead him to abandon her and go to Miami with Frida.

From there he returns in the company of the businessman Rogelio Valencia, a man who has a lot to do with the past of the now-pregnant Ana Cristina. Frida, also, is pregnant, and Octavio finds himself trapped between his love for his wife and his obligation to the child that Frida carries.

== Cast ==
- Susana González as Ana Cristina Robles
- César Évora as Octavio Villarreal
- Sabine Moussier as Frida Díaz de Villareal "Dama de la Corte"
- Alberto Estrella as Marcial Andrade "Napoleón"
- María Sorté as María Magdalena Ortiz
- Carmen Salinas as Consuelo "Chelo"
- Marga López as Doña Josefa Villareal
- Joaquín Cordero as Don Fernando Villarreal
- Fabián Robles as José Alfredo Moreno Ortiz
- Luis Roberto Guzmán as Gabriel Moreno Ortiz
- Vanessa Guzmán as Juliana Valencia Montes
- Luz Elena González as Fuensanta de Moreno
- Maritza Olivares as Cayetana
- Silvia Manríquez as Rosalía
- Enrique Lizalde as Rogelio Valencia
- Felicia Mercado as Lucila Montes
- Elizabeth Aguilar as Mirna Nogales de Amaral
- Ninón Sevilla as Macarena Nogales
- Ofelia Cano as Rebeca Ortiz
- Eduardo Noriega as Moisés Moyano
- Juan Carlos Serrán as Vicente "Chente" Amaral
- Carlos Amador as Chito
- Marlene Favela as Cecilia Amaral
- José Luis Reséndez as Nazario Amaral
- Radamés de Jesús as Marcelino
- Rubén Morales as Father Jesús Alarcón
- Juan Ignacio Aranda as Facundo
- Alberto Loztin as Rubén Alarcón
- Mauricio Aspe as Tobías Morán
- Benjamín Rivero as El Ratón
- Víctor Noriega as Paulo Sacristan
- Harry Geithner as Everardo Castillo
- Miguel Córcega as Father Manuel Robles
- José Ángel García as Rodolfo Moreno
- Blanca Torres as Enriqueta
- Aurora Alonso as Prudencia
- Freddy Ortega as Caco
- Germán Ortega as Queeco
- Jaime Lozano as Dr. Edgardo Ramos
- Humberto Elizondo as Dr. Ortega
- Aldo Monti as Lorenzo Ponti
- Manuel "Loco" Valdés as Rigoberto "Rigo" Alarcón
- Juan Carlos Casasola as El Catrín
- Violeta Isfel as Paz
- Tatiana Martínez as Lucía
- Patricia Romero as Lucha
- Pablo Montero as Ánimas "Alma Caritativa"
- Ernesto Alonso as Abad
- Arturo Peniche as Fabio Sacristan
- Marcial Casale as Trinidad
- Armando Palomo as Libertad
- Susana Lozano as Goya
- Claudia Cervantes as Elena
- Irma Torres as Mirta
- Rodolfo Reyes as Teodoro
- Vicente Torres as Adrián
- Alberto Díaz as Arturo
- Norma Reyna as Luz
- Manuel Benítez as Iván
- Roberto Meza as Ismael
- Fernando Nesme as Oscar
- Andrés Garza as Fernando "Fernandito" Villarreal Díaz Valencia
- Alejandro Hernández as Juan Manuel Villarreal Valencia
- Omar Ayala as El Tractor
- Jessica Jurado as Martha del Castillo
- Aleida Núñez as India
- Gerardo Gallardo as Monje
- Julio Escalero as Monje
- Jacqueline Bracamontes as Leonela Montenegro de Valencia
- Jorge Luis Pascual as Young Rogelio Valencia
- Héctor Cruz as Young Father Manuel Robles
- Oscar Traven as Nicolás Villarreal

== Awards and nominations ==
Year	Award	Category	Nominee	Result
2002	20th TVyNovelas Awards	Best Actor	César Évora	Nominated
2002	20th TVyNovelas Awards	Best Antagonist Actor	Alberto Estrella	Nominated
2002	20th TVyNovelas Awards	Best Leading Actress	Marga López	Nominated
2002	20th TVyNovelas Awards	Best Co-lead Actress	María Sorté	Nominated
2002	20th TVyNovelas Awards	Best Co-lead Actor	Luis Roberto Guzmán	Nominated
2002	20th TVyNovelas Awards	Best Supporting Actress	Carmen Salinas	Nominated
2002	20th TVyNovelas Awards	Best Female Revelation	Susana González	Won
2003	Palmas de Oro Awards	Best Actor	César Évora	Won
2003	INTE Awards	Production of the Year	Salvador Mejía Alejandre	Nominated
2003	INTE Awards	Actor of the Year	César Évora	Nominated
2003	INTE Awards	Supporting Actress of the Year	María Sorté	Nominated
2003	INTE Awards	Supporting Actor of the Year	Alberto Estrella	Nominated
2003	INTE Awards	Director of the Year	Miguel Córcega	Nominated
2003	INTE Awards	Screenwriter of the Year	Liliana Abud	Nominated
2003	INTE Awards	Program Opening of the Year	Entre el amor y el odio	Nominated

== DVD release ==
The telenovela was released on DVD in region one on 7 March 2006 with optional English subtitles. The 124-episode series was abridged to a run time of 550 minutes.

== In popular culture ==
Entre el Amor y el Odio was the subject of a parody on the Mexican television program XHDRbZ which was called Entre el amor y Elodio. Susana González, Eugenio Derbez and Sammy appeared in the sketch as Elodio.

In television series Los simuladores, pictures of the telenovela are shown.

== See also ==
- List of programs broadcast by Televisa networks
