= Heist film =

Subgenre of crime films

The heist film or caper film is a subgenre of crime films and the caper story, focused on the planning, execution, and aftermath of a significant robbery.

One of the early defining heist films was The Asphalt Jungle (1950), which according to Film Genre 2000, "almost single-handedly popularized the genre for mainstream cinema". It featured robbers whose personal failings ultimately led to the failure of their robbery. Similar films using this formula were Armored Car Robbery (1950), The Killing (1956), and The Getaway (1972). By the 1990s, heist films began to "experiment and play with these conventions", incorporating elements such as comedy into their stories, as Topkapi had so successfully in 1964.

The caper, a subgenre of the crime film, organises its narrative around the assembly of a crew, the execution of a robbery and its subsequent unravelling.

== Characteristics of the genre ==
While there is no unanimous agreement on what constitutes a heist film, there are some common characteristics that most films in the genre share.

The most basic is that films in the genre tend to follow the planning, execution and aftermath of one large robbery. While there can be smaller crimes leading up to the major crime, this major crime is the centerpiece of the film and is the event which informs much of the film's plot. As a result of this, heist films tend to focus on the process of the crime, often planned in great detail, followed by extended exposition of the heist itself.

The genre is also distinguished by almost exclusively following those committing the crime rather than whoever is trying to stop them. This often leads to the viewer building some form of sympathy or respect for the criminals. Another common characteristic is the assembling of a team to complete the heist, with each member contributing a unique skill or trait needed to complete the job.

Over time filmmakers have taken these characteristics and changed them to create interesting plays on the genre. For example, Reservoir Dogs (1992) skips the execution of the heist and most of its planning, choosing instead to focus almost exclusively on the aftermath. Another example of this is The Italian Job (1969), which shows the planning and execution of the heist but doesn't fully show the aftermath. The teen comedy The Perfect Score (2004) concerns high-school students attempting to steal the answers to the SAT tests rather than valuables.

Other tropes of the genre include the failure of the heist due to fate, or the traits of the criminals involved. Among them is one of the participants getting injured during the heist, or betraying the others during or after. This trend started as a result of the initial films in the genre being made in Hollywood during the Motion Picture Production Code, which prohibited criminals from getting away with their crime. While this has changed since the disappearance of the code, the trope of failed heists still remains. One of the most dynamic examples is Reservoir Dogs, which focuses solely on trying to figure out which of their group members betrayed them after a failed heist. Another popular trope is "one last job", whereby a criminal looking to quit the life enlists the team to commit one last heist so they will have money to live out their lives. This can be seen in early films such as The Asphalt Jungle (1950) as well as more recent like Heat (1995).

== History ==
While elements of the heist film can be seen in movies as early as The Great Train Robbery (1903), the genre didn't become fully fledged until the late 1940s and the early 1950s. The film widely agreed upon as the first to do so is John Huston's 1950 The Asphalt Jungle, starring Sterling Hayden and Sam Jaffee (with Marilyn Monroe in a supporting role). It contains many of the heist hallmarks, focusing from the criminal's perspective on the elaborate planning, flawed execution, and calamitous aftermath of a single heist. It also devotes a large amount of time to the recruiting of variously skilled criminals to form a team.

Two earlier films that some consider prior examples of the genre, and others just key to its development, are Criss Cross (1949) and The Killers (1946). While these do follow the planning, execution, and aftermath of a single heist from the criminals' perspective, some critics argue that they devote too much time to the planning and aftermath of the crime and too little to the actual job. All of these films are also notable for having elements which are indebted to film noir, including their moody, expressionistic black and white cinematography and dark fatalistic tone. As a result, scholars such as Daryl Lee refer to such examples as "noir heists". Anne Billson of the BBC cites Akira Kurosawa's Seven Samurai (1954) as an influence on the "assembling the team" trope that later became a common characteristic of heist films.

The period between 1955 and 1975 is considered by scholars to be the most productive for the heist genre. It began with American filmmakers continuing the noir heist trend in films like 5 Against the House (1955) and The Killing (1956). The '50s also saw the release of the first international heist films. Notably, a handful made in France were influenced by and responding to the American style. Two notable examples are Rififi (1955), which is known for its detailed 30 minute heist sequence, and Bob Le Flambeur (1956), known for an ending which plays with the conventions of the genre. The 1950s also marked the beginning of British heist film, including The Lavender Hill Mob (1951) and The Lady Killers (1955), pictures which introduced comedy to the genre. A notable Italian heist film from this period is Big Deal on Madonna Street (1958), a parody of the genre.

In the 1960s heist stories became more mainstream, with glossier and higher-budget heist films which moved away from the fatalism and darkness present in the earlier noir heists. Two examples of this from the early 1960s are the British film The League of Gentlemen (1960) and the American film Seven Thieves (1960). Despite having conventional heist plots about gathering together a group to commit a heist, both films balance comedy and drama, unlike the darkness of the earlier noir heist films. The mainstream shift as well as a growing cultural interest in travel led to a wave of glossy heist films involving exotic international locals, such as Topkapi (1964) and How to Steal a Million (1966). In France Rififi spawned a number of lower-budget crime films which often used Rififi as part of their title. These include films such as Rififi in Tokyo (1963) and Du rififi à Paname (1966). As the decade continued, the French also began to produce more glossy heist films which served as star vehicles for big names of the time, such as Any Number Can Win (1963) starring Alain Delon and Greed in the Sun (1964) starring Jean-Paul Belmondo. The most celebrated French heist films of this time were directed by Jean-Pierre Melville, whose heist film Le Cercle Rouge (1970) is often regarded as one of the greatest heist movies of all time. This expansion of the genre in the 1960s also led to remakes of older heist movies, with an early example being Cairo (1963), which is a remake of The Asphalt Jungle. In 1968, the motion picture production code was abolished, paving the way for a number of heist films that didn't shy away from portraying graphic violence. This included films like Charley Varrick (1973) and The Getaway (1972).

The period between 1975 and the early 1990s is considered a low point for productivity in the heist genre. While some were made, such as Thief (1981) and a remake of Big Deal on Madonna Street called Crackers (1984), some critics do not consider them as meaningful developments of the genre. The 1990s would see the return of the heist film, with a number creating new interest. While pictures like John Woo's Once a Thief (1991) and Steven Soderbergh's Out of Sight (1998) would bring some attention to the genre, the three that returned the genre to prominence were Reservoir Dogs (1992), Heat (1995) and The Usual Suspects (1995).

This led to a large output of heist films throughout the 2000s. These range from British efforts like Snatch (2000) and Sexy Beast (2000) to animated films like Fantastic Mr. Fox (2009) to popular Hollywood films like Inside Man (2006) and remakes of heist classics like The Italian Job (2003). Some of the most popular heist films of this era are the remake of Ocean's 11 (2001) and its sequels Ocean's 12 (2004) and Ocean's 13 (2007), which remain so today.

== List of heist films ==
Year	Film	Ref.
1974	11 Harrowhouse	
2011	80 Million	
1971	The Anderson Tapes	
1950	Armored Car Robbery	
2021	Army of the Dead	
1950	The Asphalt Jungle	
2017	Baby Driver	
2022	The Bad Guys	
1964	Bande à part	
2008	The Bank Job	
1958	Big Deal on Madonna Street	
1978	Blue Collar	
1956	Bob le flambeur	
1996	Bottle Rocket	
1970	Le Cercle Rouge	
1995	Dead Presidents	
2018	Den of Thieves	
1966	Le deuxième souffle	
1999	Entrapment	
2011	Fast Five	
1988	A Fish Called Wanda	
2007	Flawless	
1966	Gambit	
2012	Gambit	
1972	The Getaway	
2017	Going in Style	
1967	Grand Slam	
2017	The Hatton Garden Job	
1995	Heat	
2001	Heist	
2016	Hell or High Water	
1969	Hell's Angels '69	
1972	The Hot Rock	
2015	Honor Thy Father	
1966	How to Steal a Million	
1991	Hudson Hawk	
1991	Kshana Kshanam	
2010	Inception	
2006	Inside Man	
1969	The Italian Job	
2003	The Italian Job	
1997	Jackie Brown	
1956	The Killing	
2018	King of Thieves	
1951	The Lavender Hill Mob	
1998	Lock, Stock and Two Smoking Barrels	
2017	Logan Lucky	
2009	The Maiden Heist	
2011	Mankatha	
2025	The Mastermind	
2021	The Misfits	
2013	Now You See Me	
2018	Ocean's 8	
1960	Ocean's 11	
2001	Ocean's Eleven	
2004	Ocean's Twelve	
2007	Ocean's Thirteen	
1998	Out of Sight	
2024	The Perfect Club	
1963	The Pink Panther	
1990	Quick Change	
1992	Reservoir Dogs	
1975	The Return of the Pink Panther	
1955	Rififi	
1998	Ronin	
2001	The Score	
1996	Set It Off	
2000	Sexy Beast	
2000	Snatch	
1992	Sneakers	
2016	South of 8	
1968	The Split	
1973	The Sting	
1981	Thief	
1968	The Thomas Crown Affair	
1999	The Thomas Crown Affair	
1999	Three Kings	
1964	Topkapi	
2010	The Town	
1972	Un flic	
1995	The Usual Suspects	
2004	Vinci	
2018	Widows	
2021	Wrath of Man	
2026	Keu Bole Biplobi Keu Bole Dakat	
