= List of programs broadcast by TelevisaUnivision networks =

The following is a list of original programming currently, formerly, and soon to be broadcast by TelevisaUnivision owned television networks. TelevisaUnivision owns six broadcast television networks: Las Estrellas, Canal 5, N+ Foro and Nu9ve in Mexico, and Univision and UniMás in the United States.

== Current programming ==
=== Las Estrellas ===
Dramas

- La rosa de Guadalupe (February 5, 2008)
- Como dice el dicho (Note: Rerun) (February 1, 2011)
- El renacer de Luna (June 22, 2026)
- Rubí (July 27, 2026)
- Sabor a ti (September 21, 2026)
- Tierra de amor y coraje (October 5, 2026)

Comedies

- La familia P. Luche (August 7, 2002)
- Vecinos (July 10, 2005)
- Una familia de diez (March 22, 2007)
- Nosotros los guapos (November 8, 2016)
- 40 y 20 (November 9, 2016)
- ¿Tú crees? (July 31, 2022)
- Tal para cual (October 13, 2022)
- El príncipe del barrio (July 2, 2023)
- Más vale sola (September 1, 2024)
- El Chavo del Ocho (October 21, 2024)
- Muero por Marilú (February 23, 2025)
- El Chapulín Colorado (April 5, 2025)

Reality/non-scripted

- Pequeños Gigantes (March 27, 2011)
- ¿Quién es la máscara? (August 25, 2019)
- El retador (August 15, 2021)
- La casa de los famosos México (June 4, 2023)

Game shows

- 100 mexicanos dijieron (2001)
- Minuto para ganar VIP (2013)
- Veo cómo cantas

Talk/Late-night shows

- Cuéntamelo ya (April 16, 2016)
- + NOCHE (August 25, 2018)

News and information

- Hoy (August 3, 1998)
- Las Noticias (August 22, 2016)
- Despierta (August 22, 2016)
- Al aire con Paola Rojas (August 22, 2016)
- En punto con Denise Maerker (August 22, 2016)

Sports

- Liga MX
- Acción (1979)
- La jugada (1993)
- Más deporte (1997)

=== Canal 5 ===
- Me caigo de risa (March 4, 2014)
- Inseparables: amor al límite (May 27, 2019)
- La casa de los famosos México (June 5, 2023)
- Cero ruido (March 4, 2024)
- ¿Quién caerá? (March 4, 2024)
- Vence a las estrellas (May 6, 2024)
- La caja de los secretos (May 6, 2024)
- Soltero cotizado (October 28, 2024)
- La CQ: nuevo ingreso (December 9, 2024)
- Cuando fui bonita (September 28, 2026)

=== Nu9ve ===
Talk/reality shows

- Reventón musical
- ¡Despierta América! (July 9, 2018)
- Enámorandonos (September 13, 2021)

News/public affairs programming

- Aquí y Ahora
- Domingo de tercer milenio

Sports

- Hazaña el deporte vive
- Lucha Libre AAA

=== FOROtv ===
- Agenda Pública
- A las tres
- Creadores Universitarios
- En 1 hora
- Es la hora de opinar
- Estrictamente Personal
- Foro Global
- Fractal
- Historias por Contar
- Las Noticias
- Major League Baseball
- Matutino Express
- Noticias CDMX
- Paralelo 23
- Si me dicen no vengo
- Sin Filtro

== Upcoming programming ==
Title	Premiere date	Channel	Ref.
Infinito amor	October 12, 2026	Las Estrellas	

== Former programming ==
=== Comedies ===
- Albertano contra los mostros (2022)
- Alma de ángel (2019)
- Ay María qué puntería (1998)
- Bola de locos (2023–2024)
- Cepillin (1977)
- Chespirito (1970; 1980–1995)
- ¡Chócalas Compayito! (2023–2025)
- El Diablito
- Foro Loco
- ¿Es neta, Eva? (2023–2024)
- Está libre (2023–2024)
- La Hora Azul (1992)
- Incógnito (2005)
- Incorregibles de Santa Martha (2024–2025)
- Julia vs. Julia (2019)
- Lorenza (2019–2020)
- La Matraca
- Me caigo de risa: Gala disfuncional (2021–2022)
- Mi Barrio (1991–1994)
- Mi querida herencia (2019–2021)
- Mi lista de exes (2018)
- Odisea Burbujas
- Operacion Ja Ja
- La parodia (2002–2020)
- Perdiendo el juicio (2021–2022)
- Los Polivoces
- ¡Qué madre tan padre! (2006)
- Relatos macabrones (2020–2023)
- Renta congelada (2017–2023)
- Según Bibi (2018)
- Simón dice (2018–2019)
- S.O.S.S.A
- Tic Tac Toc: El reencuentro (2021)
- Todo de Todo (1991–1994)
- Tomy Zombie (2025)
- Un Criada Bien Criada
- Y sin embargo se mueve (1994)
- Con permiso (1996)
- Dr. Cándido Pérez (1987–1993)

=== Game shows ===
- Siempre en domingo (1969-1998)
- XE-TU (1982-1987) & XE-TÚ Remix (1996)
- Atinale al Precio (The Price Is Right) (1997–2000), (2010)
- Nuevas Tardes (1996)
- ¡Llévatelo! (Take It!) (1993-1995)
- La Rueda de la Fortuna (1994 - 1996)
- ¡Pácatelas! (1995 - 1997)
- Picardía Mexicana (1997 - 2000)
- Mucho Gusto (1999) Con Laura Zapata
- En Familia con Chabelo (1967-2015)
- Fantastico Amor (1999)
- Vida TV Moved to Vida TV, El Show
- Club 4TV & El Club (2001 - 2003)
- Nuestra Casa (2002 - 2007) 4TV & Canal 2
- La Botana (1997 - 2000)
- Se vale (2006 - 2012)
- Arriesga TV (2009)
- Al Mediodía AMD (2005 - 2006)

=== Talk/news programming ===
- 1N Primero Noticias (1999 - 2002), (2004 - 2016)
- 24 Horas (1970-1998)
- En Contacto Directo
- 60 minutos
- Adal, el Show (2015)
- Al Despertar (1992-1998)
- Al Aire (1992-1993), (2016)
- Aquí entre 2 (2000) finals
- A Través del Video (1995 - 1998)
- Chapultepec 18 (1998), (2016).
- Duro Y Directo (1997 - 1999)
- Economía de Mercado
- El Mañanero
- El Noticiero con Guillermo Ortega (1998-2000)
- El Noticiero con Joaquín López Dóriga (2000-2016)
- El Noticiero con Lolita Ayala (1998-2016)
- En Concreto (1997)
- En Contraste (2002 - 2004)
- En 1 Hora
- Fuera de la Ley
- Hora 21
- Hoy Mismo
- Las Noticias por Adela
- Muchas Noticias (1987–1998)
- Noticias ECO (1988–2001)
- Nuestro Mundo (1986–1988)
- Otro Rollo (1995–2007)
- Respuesta Opportuna
- Todo se vale (1999)
- Versus

=== Reality/non-scripted ===
- DL & Compañía (2020)
- Doble sentido (June 4, 2016 – August 18, 2018)
- Está cañón
- El coque va
- Familias frente al fuego (July 14, 2019 – August 18, 2019)
- Furia Musical (1993)
- Miembros al aire
- Mira quién baila (2018)
- Reto 4 elementos (March 19, 2018 – June 2, 2023)
- La tradición Sábados de Box
- TV de Noche
- Siempre en domingo (1969-1998)

=== Sports ===
- ¿A quién le vas? (2016–2018)

== See also ==
- Televisa
- TelevisaUnivision
