= Darker Than Night (2014 film) =

- Theatrical release poster
- Spanish: Más Negro que la Noche
- Directed by: Henry Bedwell
- Screenplay by: Henry Bedwell
- Story by: Carlos Enrique Taboada
- Produced by: Marco Polo Constandse; Marcel Ferrer; Alex Garcia; José María Torre; Leonardo Zimbrón
- Starring: Zuria Vega; Adriana Louvier; Eréndira Ibarra; Ona Casamiquela; Margarita Sanz; José María Torre; Hernán Mendoza; Miguel Rodarte
- Cinematography: Marc Bellver
- Edited by: Marc Dominici
- Music by: Joan Valent
- Production companies: Celeste Films; Filmadora Nacional; Neo Art
- Distributed by: Videocine
- Release date: 14 August 2014
- Running time: 100 minutes
- Country: Mexico
- Language: Spanish
- Budget: MXN$37.7 million (USD$2.5 million)
- Box office: $6.1 million

Darker Than Night (Spanish: Más Negro que la Noche) is a 2014 Mexican horror film and a remake of the 1975 original. The movie is the first 3D Mexican horror film and it tells the story of an eccentric old woman who dies and leaves her opulent mansion to her niece, Greta.

== Plot ==
Greta is a beautiful young woman whose eccentric aunt dies leaving her a large, once opulent mansion. When Greta moves in with her friends, she discovers that she must take care of her aunt’s prized black cat, Beker. The new residents take charge of the mansion, throwing wild parties and enjoying a fun filled summer until they lose track of Beker – who drowns in the mansion’s pool. What was about to be the best summer of their lives quickly turns into a spine-chilling fight for their lives.

== Cast ==
- Zuria Vega as Greta
- Adriana Louvier as Maria
- Eréndira Ibarra as Pilar
- Ona Casamiquela as Victoria "Vicky"
- José María Torre as Pedro
- Miguel Rodarte as Actuacion especial Loco
- Margarita Sanz as Evangelina
- Lucía Guilmáin as Tia Ofelia
- Hernán Mendoza as Garcia
- Daniel Villar as Prometido Tia

== Release ==
Darker Than Night opened theatrically in the United States on 26 September 2014 and earned $539,867 in its opening weekend, ranking number 17 at the box office. At the end of its run, it had grossed $870,063 domestically and $5,221,000 overseas for a worldwide total of $6,091,063.
