= The Perfect Club =

- Theatrical release poster
- Directed by: Ricardo Castro Velazquez
- Written by: Ricardo Castro Velazquez
- Produced by: Jonathan Davis Arakelian; Moisés Chiver; Adrian Ituarte
- Starring: Ana Layevska; Alfonso Borbolla; Liz Gallardo; Hernán del Riego; Aldo Escalante; Xavier García; Rodrigo Munguía; Gabriel Fritsch; Daniela Martínez; Andrea Tova; Diego Peniche; Miguel Orlando; Dei Saldaña; Jorge Reyes; Regina Carrillo; Gabriel Ulloa; Selene Gottdiner
- Cinematography: Santiago Cantillo
- Edited by: Horacio Romo Mercado
- Music by: Tomás Barreiro
- Production companies: Alazraki Entertainment; Edge Films
- Distributed by: Cinemex Distribución
- Release dates: October 27, 2024 (AFF); August 28, 2025 (Mexico)
- Running time: 102 minutes
- Country: Mexico
- Language: Spanish

The Perfect Club (Spanish: El club perfecto) is a 2024 Mexican heist comedy film written and directed by Ricardo Castro Velazquez. It follows two mismatched students who form a club that steals exams to pass the grade. The cast is composed of Ana Layevska, Alfonso Borbolla, Liz Gallardo, Hernán del Riego, Aldo Escalante, Xavier García, Rodrigo Munguía, Gabriel Fritsch, Daniela Martínez, Andrea Tova, Diego Peniche, Miguel Orlando, Dei Saldaña, Jorge Reyes, Regina Carrillo, Gabriel Ulloa and Selene Gottdiner.

== Synopsis ==
Diego and Emilio Mirko are two diametrically opposed students who, after a confrontation, forge an unexpected friendship and found an underground club to steal exams. This gradually transforms their lives.

== Cast ==
- Ana Layevska
- Alfonso Borbolla
- Liz Gallardo
- Hernán del Riego
- Aldo Escalante
- Xavier García
- Rodrigo Munguía
- Gabriel Fritsch
- Daniela Martínez
- Andrea Tova
- Diego Peniche
- Miguel Orlando
- Dei Saldaña
- Jorge Reyes
- Regina Carrillo
- Gabriel Ulloa
- Selene Gottdiner

== Release ==
The Perfect Club had its world premiere on October 27, 2024, at the 31st Austin Film Festival, then screened on July 27, 2025, at the 28th Guanajuato International Film Festival.

The film was released commercially on August 28, 2025, in Mexican theaters.

== Accolades ==
Year	Award / Festival	Category	Recipient	Result	Ref.
2024	31st Austin Film Festival	Comedy Vanguard Feature	The Perfect Club	Won	
2025	28th Guanajuato International Film Festival	Best Mexican Fiction Feature Film	The Perfect Club	Nominated	
