= Eréndira Ibarra =

Mexican actress, casting director (born 1989)

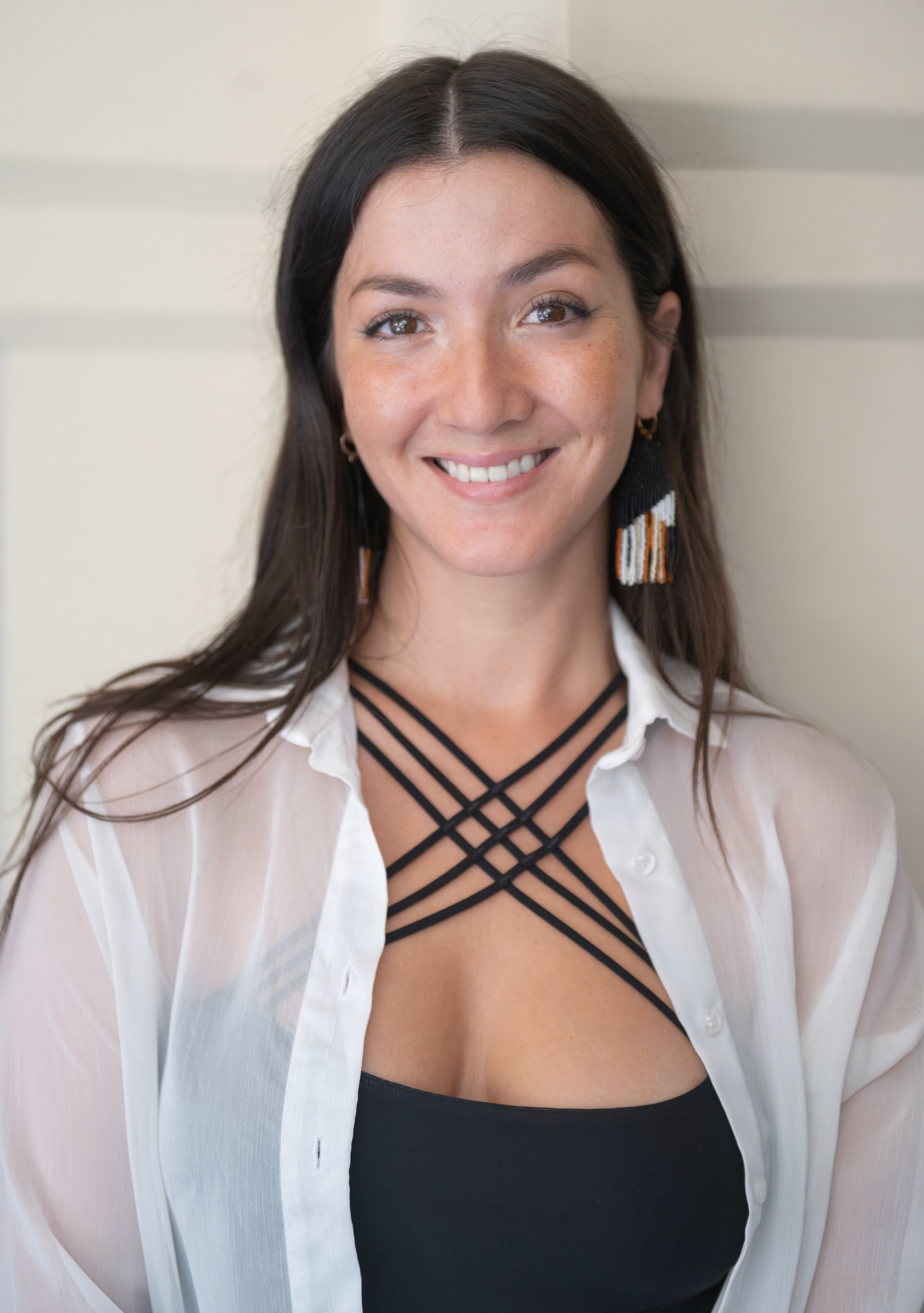
- Ibarra in 2025
- Born: September 25, 1985 (age 40); Mexico City, Mexico
- Occupation: Actress
- Years active: 2006–present
- Spouse: Fredd Londoño (m. 2010)
- Children: 1

Eréndira Ibarra (born September 25, 1985) is a Mexican actress and casting director, known for Sense8 (2015–18), Las Aparicio (2015), Ingobernable (2017), and The Matrix Resurrections (2021).

== Personal life ==
Ibarra is the daughter of producer Epigmenio Ibarra, and studied at the artistic studio in Casa Azul. She is bisexual. She has been married to Venezuelan model Fredd Londoño since 2010; the couple have one son, Rocco (born 2017).

== Filmography ==
=== Film ===
| Year | Title | Roles | Notes |
|---|---|---|---|
| 2006 | Sexo, amor y otras perversiones 2 | Mary, mother of Jesus | Released 2011, filmed same year as the first film |
| 2008 | Casi divas | Sandra | |
| 2009 | Entre líneas | Johanna | Short film |
| 2009 | Juegos inocentes | Marcela | |
| 2010 | Sucedió en un día | Siete | Segment: "Siete" |
| 2011 | Double Tap | Amy | |
| 2012 | Amor del bueno | Valentina | Short film |
| 2014 | Más negro que la noche | Pilar | |
| 2015 | Las Aparicio | Mariana Almada | |
| 2016 | La vida inmoral de la pareja ideal | Florentina Calle | |
| 2018 | A ti te quería encontrar | Lu | |
| 2020 | Fuego negro | Rubi | |
| 2020 | Monstruosamente Solo | Camila | |
| 2021 | The Matrix Resurrections | Lexy | |

=== Television roles ===
| Year | Title | Roles | Notes |
|---|---|---|---|
| 2008 | Deseo prohibido | Rebeca Santos | |
| 2008–2012 | Capadocia | Sofía López | Recurring role |
| 2010 | Las Aparicio | Mariana Almada | Main cast |
| 2011 | Bienvenida realidad | Mrs. Kristein | |
| 2011 | El octavo mandamiento | Casilda Barreiro | Recurring role |
| 2011 | El Diez | Ximena Calleja | Main cast |
| 2012 | Infames | Casilda Barreiro | Co-starring role |
| 2014 | Camelia la Texana | Alison Bailow de Varela | Recurring role |
| 2015 | Señorita Pólvora | Tatiana Hucke | Recurring role |
| 2015–2018 | Sense8 | Daniela Velázquez | Recurring role |
| 2017 | Ingobernable | Ana Vargas-West | Main cast |
| 2019 | Sitiados: México | Inés | Main cast |
| 2020 | El Candidato | Isabel Alfaro | Main cast |
| 2024 | The Accident | Lupita | |
| 2026 | El precio de la fama | Mía Moreno | Main cast |
