= Contrato de Amor =

Mexican telenovela

Contrato de amor (Love Contract) is a Mexican telenovela produced by the Mexican television network TV Azteca from August 11, 2008 to February 6, 2009. Based on Catalina y Sebastián.

The telenovela starred Leonardo García and Ximena Rubio.

== Cast ==
- Leonardo García - Gabriel, main character. Loves Ana, and believes she loves him until his father, but questions whether she loves him or his family's money.
- Ximena González Rubio - Ana Cristina, main character. The first few episodes of the show she is dating Alejandro, who she wishes to marry. Her family forces them to stay apart because Alejandro is poor and works as a trainer at a gym. She refuses to do listen and claims she will marry him. She finds him in bed with Barbara and decides to never marry for love, but to marry for money. She decides to marry Gabriel in order to help her family and by a trick of her mother, Patricia, manages to get Gabriel to marry her legally. They are almost married by the Catholic Church when Gabriel's father pulls a trick on her and her family by pretending that Gabriel is not his son, but that Isaías is the heir to his fortune. (present like Ximena González Rubio)
- Alejandra Maldonado - Patricia, mother of Ana, she enjoys living a lavish lifestyle and despises the idea of living within their means. She cares more about appearances and encourages Ana to marry Gabriel for the money. (Antagonist. She becomes good.)
- Eugenio Montessoro - Alfredo, father of Ana, truly loves his family, but is largely manipulated by his wife, Patricia, to spend money that they don't have and thus creates the debt that his family is in.
- Álvaro Guerrero - Fernando, father of Gabriel and father of Isaías. He hates talking about his wife, mother of Gabriel and Laura, because she was a gold digger. He had an affair with Griselda that produced the bastard son, Isaías.
- Alberto Casanova - Isaías, he has lived and worked with Fernando and his family that he considers himself part of the family. He is told by Griselda that he is the bastard son of Fernando and is convinced that the family fortune belongs to him. (Antagonist. Dies of a shoot.)
- Mayra Sierra - Regina, old friend of Laura, loves Gabriel and tries to break up Ana and Gabriel (Antagonist. Dies of a shoot.)
- Carmen Beato - Griselda, business woman, enemy of Gabriel's family
- Francisco Angelini - Enrique, brother of Ana, encourages Ana to marry for money in order to get him and his parents out of debt.
- Gloria Stalina - Soledad, friend of Ana
- Daniela Wong - Laura, younger sister of Ana, she is aware of the troubles her family causes and later in the series begins to work for Gabriel's family
- Nubia Martí - Eloísa
- Mauricio Valle - Alejandro, ex boyfriend of Ana
- Danny Gamba - Diana, younger sister of Gabriel, friends with Regina. She is loyal to her family and doesn't want her brother to marry someone who doesn't love him.
- Hugo Catalán - Rodrigo, works for Fernando and Gabriel, is a love interest of Diana.
- Liliana Lago - Bárbara, rich older (34 years old) lover of Alejandro
- Armando Torrea - Apolo
- Tomás Goros - José Martín
- Adrián Rubio - Rufino
- Germán Valdéz III (Antagonist)
- Victor Luis Zuñiga - Enzo

== Synopsis ==
The show starts off in Toluca, Mexico with Ana and Alejandro dating until he cheats on her with Bárbara. They break up and Ana begins to date Gabriel, the son of a rich businessman. Ana's family desires this marriage in order to use Gabriel's money to help them get out of debt. This plan works to the point that Patricia, Ana's mom, fakes an illness in order to rush the legal marriage of Ana and Gabriel. Ana and Gabriel are set to be married by the Catholic Church until Gabriel's father decides to trick Ana and her family into believing that Gabriel is not his real son, that Isaías is his true son, and therefore Gabriel will not inherit any money. Ana must make a decision, to marry him anyway, knowing that he is poor, or break off the marriage. This "test" strains Gabriel and Ana's relationship because she truly loves him and feels betrayed by his dishonesty, but Gabriel now believes she only wanted to marry him for his money. They are legally married so they decide to live together to see if they can save their marriage and as part of the deal with Fernando, Gabriel's father, Ana must pay back the money that Gabriel had used to get her family out of debt. In the meantime both Isaías and Regina try to break Gabriel and Ana up in order for each of them to be with the other person.

== Episodes ==
- Episode 1: Ana and Alejandro are together, Ana's family plots to marry her off to a single, rich business man that Alfredo works with, Fernando. We learn that Fernando had married a woman that only wanted his money. He has a fear that the same thing will happen to his children, Gabriel and Diana. The episode ends with news that Gabriel is closer to Ana's age and thus more eligible for marriage.
- Episode 2: Laura, Ana's younger sister, offers herself to marry Gabriel if Ana refuses. Ana and Gabriel have a chance meeting so Ana has no idea that she has met the man her family wishes her to marry. Gabriel falls in love with her personality and Ana's father convinces him that Ana is playing "hard to get" by saying things like "I have a boyfriend." Meanwhile Ana confides in her friend, Soledad, that her and Alejandro are planning on eloping. Ana goes on a lunch date with Gabriel where he kisses her. Fernando, Gabriel's father decides to hire a private detective to learn more about Ana Christina and her intentions with Gabriel.
- Episode 3:
- Episode 4:
- Episode 5:
- Episode 6:
- Episode 7:
- ...
- Episode 126:
