= Dark Forces (2020 film) =

2020 Mexican film

- Film poster
- Spanish: Fuego negro
- Directed by: Bernardo Arellano
- Written by: Bernardo Arellano
- Starring: Tenoch Huerta; Erendira Ibarra; Mauricio Aspe; Johana Fragoso Blendl; Dale Carley
- Production companies: Biznaga Films; Corazón Films
- Distributed by: Netflix
- Release date: August 21, 2020
- Running time: 81 minutes
- Country: Mexico
- Language: Spanish

Dark Forces (Spanish: Fuego negro) is a 2020 Mexican action horror film directed and written by Bernardo Arellano and starring Tenoch Huerta, Erendira Ibarra, Mauricio Aspe, Johana Fragoso Blendl and Dale Carley.

== Cast ==
- Tenoch Huerta as Franco
- Mauricio Aspe as Max
- Johana Fragoso Blendl as Julia
- Dale Carley as Jack
- Ángel Garnica as Botones
- Eréndira Ibarra as Rubí
- Eglé Ivanauskaité as Molly
- Daina Soledad Liparoti as Diva
- Ariane Pellicer as Helga
- Pedro Prieto as Hombre de negro
- Marina Vera as Recepcionista
- Nick Zedd as Demonio

== Release ==
Dark Forces was released on August 21, 2020 on Netflix.
