= Ximena Rubio =

Mexican film and television actress

Ximena González Rubio is a Mexican film and television actress. She was born in Mexico City on December 2, 1978, granddaughter of famous Mexican film director Servando González, the first Mexican to direct a film in Hollywood and sister to director Pedro González Rubio.

== Training ==
Ximena studied classical ballet from the age of six. In her teens, she decided to study acting, training with Luwick Margules and José Luís Ibáñez, of the Actoral Training Centre (CEFAC) of TV Azteca in Mexico. Ximena Rubio's father was architecture and mother was lawyer. In 2007, she traveled to New York City to continue training at The Actors Studio, but decided to end her studies when she received the offer to star in the telenovela "Contrato de Amor"

== Telenovelas and movies ==
=== Telenovelas ===
- 2011: El 8º Mandamiento" ... Sofia
- 2010: Stars in "Las Aparicio" with Liz Gallardo, Gabriela de la Garza and Maria del Carmen Farías
- 2008: Stars in "Contrato de Amor
- 2004: "Al Filo de la Ley", "Gitanas"
- 2002: " Daniela"
- 2001: "Lo que callamos las mujeres".
- 2000: "Golpe Bajo" y "Hablama de Amor"
- 1999: "Háblame de Amor", "Besos prohibidos"
- 1998: "Señora", "Azul Tequila"

=== Movies ===
- 2003: Maravillas
- 2007: El viaje de la nona
- 2012: The Fantastic World of Juan Orol

== See also ==
- Las Aparicio
