= El precio de la fama (2026 TV series) =

- Genre: Drama; Thriller
- Created by: Natasha Ybarra-Klor; Michelle Renaud
- Written by: Natasha Ybarra-Klor
- Directed by: Kenya Márquez
- Starring: Eréndira Ibarra; Andrés Palacios; Mane de la Parra
- Composers: Pedro Mata; Violeta Torres
- Country of origin: Mexico
- Original language: Spanish
- No. of seasons: 1
- No. of episodes: 8

Production
- Executive producer: Iván Aranda
- Producers: Epigmenio Ibarra; Verónica Velasco
- Cinematography: Gerónimo Denti
- Editors: Christian Velázquez; Diana Gutiérrez
- Camera setup: Multi-camera
- Production companies: TelevisaUnivision; Argos Televisión

Original release
- Network: Vix
- Release: 29 May 2026

El precio de la fama is a Mexican thriller television series created by Natasha Ybarra-Klor and Michelle Renaud. It stars Eréndira Ibarra, Andrés Palacios and Mane de la Parra. The series premiered on Vix on 29 May 2026.

== Plot ==
During her childhood, telenovela actress Mía Moreno witnessed the suicide of Amanda Escalante, a star she admired. Years later, Mia faces the first major setback of her career when she loses a leading role to influencer and rising star Renata Lezama. However, everything changes when Renata dies mysteriously on the night she is announced as the protagonist of the series Espinas y Pasiones. From that point on, Mia is caught in a web of deceit, extortion, and criminal activity masterminded by Él Ángel, a mysterious individual that controls everyone who works for MX Studios.

== Cast ==
- Eréndira Ibarra as Mía Moreno
  - Miroslava Munguía as child Mía
- Andrés Palacios as Germán Vela
- Mane de la Parra as Santiago Urrutia
  - Mateo Barcelata Suárez as young Santiago
- Livia Brito as Amanda Escalante
- Gaby Espino as Renata Lezama
- Otto Sirgo as Eugenio
  - Eduardo Reza as young Eugenio
- Chantal Andere as Sandra
  - Cami Romeo as young Sandra
- Alejandra Barros as Sonia
  - Krystel Rubalcava as young Sonia
- Alejandro Ávila as Abel
  - Paco Francisco as young Abel
- Tamara Mazarrasa as Rojas
- Xabiani Ponce de León as Pablo
  - Valentino Barcelata as child Pablo
- Bernardo Flores as Diego
- Ignacio Riva Palacio as Toño
- Tamara Vallarta as Frida
- Isabella Navarrete as Lau

== Episodes ==
No.	Title	Original release date
1	"Ten cuidado con lo que deseas"	29 May 2026
2	"El precio de los sueños"	29 May 2026
3	"El Ángel"	29 May 2026
4	"La entrevista"	29 May 2026
5	"La suerte de Mía"	29 May 2026
6	"El castigo"	29 May 2026
7	"Perdóname Simón"	29 May 2026
8	"Verdad o fama"	29 May 2026
