= El Candidato (TV series) =

- Genre: Political thriller
- Created by: Peter Blake
- Written by: Eva Aridjis; Peter Blake; David Chasteen; Ted Cohen; Max Hurwitz; Daniel Krauze; Katherine Walczak
- Directed by: Jaime Reynoso; Humberto Hinojosa Ozcariz
- Starring: José María de Tavira; Joaquín Cosío; James Purefoy; Eréndira Ibarra; Bret Harrison; Esmeralda Pimentel
- Music by: Yamil Rezc
- Country of origin: Mexico
- Original languages: Spanish; English
- No. of episodes: 10

Production
- Producers: Televisa; New Wye Productions; Juan Rendón; Natalie Osma
- Cinematography: Marc Bellver A.M.C.; Felipe Perez-Burchard
- Editors: Sonia Sanchez Carrasco; Eugenio Richer; Ares Botanch; José Pablo Escalera
- Running time: 50+ minutes/episode
- Production company: Televisa

Original release
- Release: 17 July 2020 – present

El Candidato (in English, The Candidate) is a Mexican political thriller television series created by Peter Blake and produced by Televisa for Amazon Prime Video.

The main cast of the series consists of James Purefoy, José María de Tavira, Eréndira Ibarra, Joaquín Cosío and Esmeralda Pimentel.

The series trailer was released on 15 July 2020. The series premiered on 17 July 2020 on Amazon Prime Video.

== Plot ==
Rookie CIA field operative Isabel Alfaro works alongside CIA agent Wayne Addison to bring down Rafael Bautista, Mexico's most vicious narco. Her mission brings her into conflict with Eduardo Yzaguirre, her former boyfriend and the current mayor of Mexico City.

== Episodes ==
No.	Title	Directed by	Written by	Original release date
1	"Pilot"	Jaime Reynoso	Peter Blake	July 17, 2020
Espionage, crime and politics collide in modern-day Mexico City. A brilliant but self-destructive CIA officer, his young and ambitious Mexican-American protegee, and the city's inspirational but secretive Mayor all struggle for power during an invasion of the city by the world’s most murderous drug cartel.
2	"Artículo 29"	Jaime Reynoso	Daniel Krauze	July 17, 2020
Wayne works with the joint Mexican-American "Fusion Center" to track the sicarios responsible for the recent bloodshed. Isa ignores orders to stay in the embassy and instead pursues a lead to the Guerrero Cartel. And Lalo puts his career at risk, battling the Mexican President for control of the narco investigations.
3	"Lightbulb"	Max Hurwitz	Humberto Hinojosa Ozcariz	July 17, 2020
Isa recruits her first "asset," a source with connections to the cartel, but stretches ethical boundaries in the process. A visitor from Wayne's past dredges up unpleasant and violent memories. Lalo risks his relationship with his wife to pursue a rape prosecution against children of the rich and powerful. And Bautista's plan for the city starts to become clearer.
4	"Toques"	Ted Cohen	Humberto Hinojosa Ozcariz	July 17, 2020
Wayne, Isa and Pamela undertake a dangerous mission, infiltrating a corrupt banker who could lead them to the Guerrero cartel. Lalo and Isa start to bond while working on an art exhibition, but their past conflicts re-emerge to threaten their friendship. And Bautista's sicarios conduct a mysterious operation that ends up having terrifying consequences for the city.
5	"Operativo"	Jaime Reynoso	Peter Blake & David Chasteen	July 17, 2020
Wayne, Isa and Romero work frantically to rescue the hostages. Lalo and his police force do the same, but Lalo has his own agenda. Bautista carries out a mysterious plan involving his sicarios. And Wayne and Isa eventually come to a terrible realization about why Bautista invaded the city.
6	"Blackberries"	Jaime Reynoso	Katherine Walczak	July 17, 2020
Lalo's left reeling from the events of the last episode. He takes Isa on a trip to his family's estate outside of the city, which allows Isa to learn one of Lalo's biggest secrets. Meanwhile, Wayne discovers Bautista's weakness and uses it to lay a trap for the narco. But Bautista is also laying a trap of his own.
7	"En la ciudad de la furia"	Humberto Hinojosa Ozcariz	Max Hurwitz	July 17, 2020
Isa breaks with Wayne over the recent bloodshed and engages in risky behavior, both professionally and personally. Wayne visits a figure from his past, and in flashback, we learn the tragic origins of his hatred for Bautista. Bautista takes a physical and spiritual journey into the hills of Guerrero, coming to a decision that will have horrible consequences for Lalo and the entire country of Mexico.
8	"Fireside Chat"	Humberto Hinojosa Ozcariz	Ted Cohen	July 17, 2020
Wayne's off-the-books operations finally catch up to him as Isa's fiancé pursues a lead that could put both Wayne and Isa in jail. Isa has to create a fake asset to cover up for Wayne's misbehavior. Meanwhile, Bautista threatens Wayne's life, but mysteriously, and ominously, lets him live. Veronica starts to realize the truth about her marriage. And Lalo gets his hands dirtier than ever before.
9	"La cabaña en el bosque"	Jaime Reynoso	Katherine Walczak & Daniel Krauze	July 17, 2020
Lalo has a head-to-head confrontation with the Guerrero cartel, with fatal results. A risky Hail Mary from Wayne puts him and Isa into bloody conflict with the Northern Federation. And Isa and Lalo come to a realization about their relationship.
10	"Desert of the Lions"	Jaime Reynoso	Peter Blake	July 17, 2020
In the aftermath of the previous episode, Wayne, Isa, Veronica and Lalo all come to realizations about their lives and relationships. By the season's end, the previous alliances have been destroyed and new ones are being built. And our main characters have to prepare for war, with new battle lines drawn.

== Cast ==
- José María de Tavira
- Joaquín Cosío
- James Purefoy
- Eréndira Ibarra
- Bret Harrison
- Esmeralda Pimentel
- Kerry Adra
- Sofía Sisniega
- Luis Alberti
- Francisco de la Reguera
- Hernán Mendoza
- Cassandra Sánchez Navarro
- Sofía Espinosa
- Ernesto Godoy
- Aída López
- Gustavo Sánchez Parra
- Tizoc Arroyo
- Valentina Buzzurro
- Martín Rojas
- Macarena Achaga
- Rodrigo Correa
- Mario Loría
- Claudette Maillé
- Ofelia Medina

== Critical reception ==
The critical reception was very positive.

A week after its premiere, the Heraldo de Mexico newspaper wrote that the series had become one of the Mexican public’s favorites and was generating debate on social media about governmental corruption." Álvaro Cueva, writing in Milenio, called the series “magnificent” and wrote “I loved it, it moved me, it shocked me.” Alerta Qro called the show “one of the best series that our country has ever produced,” owing to its “great cast” and “intelligent and complex script.” GQ India called it “a gripping tale of power, money, hatred and love.” Techquila rated the series 9/10 and said that “El Candidato is a must-watch if you’re craving some fast-paced CIA action.”
