= The Accident (Mexican TV series) =

2024 Mexican TV series

- Promotional release poster
- Spanish: Accidente
- Genre: Thriller; Drama
- Written by: Leonardo Padrón
- Directed by: Klych López; Gracia Querejeta
- Starring: Ana Claudia Talancón; Eréndira Ibarra; Erick Elías
- Country of origin: Mexico
- Original language: Spanish
- No. of seasons: 2
- No. of episodes: 16

Production
- Executive producer: Andres Barahona
- Cinematography: David F. Mayo
- Editor: Juan Carlos Arroyo
- Camera setup: Multi-camera
- Running time: 40–51 min
- Production company: Mar Abierto Productions

Original release
- Network: Netflix
- Release: August 21, 2024 – present

The Accident (Spanish: Accidente) is a Mexican thriller drama television series directed by Klych López and Gracia Querejeta and written by Leonardo Padrón. Produced by Mar Abierto Productions, and stars Ana Claudia Talancón, Eréndira Ibarra and Erick Elías. The series premiered on Netflix on August 21, 2024. The plot centers on the aftermath of three children dying when a bouncy castle, full of children, flies away. Season 2 premiered on December 10, 2025.

== Cast ==
- Ana Claudia Talancón as Daniela
- Sebastian Martínez as Emiliano
- Alberto Guerra as El Charro
- Eréndira Ibarra as Lupita
- Shaní Lozano as Yolanda
- Silverio Palacios as Moncho
- Erick Elías as Fabián
- Erik Hayser as David
- Valentina Acosta as Brenda
- Macarena García Romero as Lucia
- Mauricio Isaac as Chief Santos
- Sebastian Dante as Alex

== Production ==
The series was announced on Netflix. The principal photography of the series commenced in September 2023. Much of the filming was done in Tequisquiapan and nearby areas of Querétaro. The trailer of the series was released on July 24, 2024.

== Reception ==
On the review aggregator website Rotten Tomatoes, 33% of 6 critics' reviews are positive, with an average rating of 4.4/10. Juan Pablo Russo of EscribiendoCine rated the series 4 stars out of 10. Joel Keller of Decider reviewed the series.

The series performed strongly in its first week on Netflix, accumulating 10.4 million CVEs in its first five days. This marks the second-best launch for a new series from Latin America on the platform.
