= Infames =

Mexican telenovela

- Genre: Telenovela
- Written by: Anaí López; Larissa Andrade; Fernanda Eguiarte; Florencia Castillo; Jaime Alfonso Sandoval; Luis Miguel Martínez; Jacques Bonnavent; Natassja Ybarra
- Story by: Daniela Gálvez
- Directed by: Moisés Ortiz Urquidi
- Creative director: Carlos Herrera
- Starring: Vanessa Guzmán; Luis Roberto Guzmán; Miguel Ángel Muñoz; Ximena Herrera
- Music by: Pedro Mata
- Country of origin: Mexico
- Original language: Spanish
- No. of seasons: 1
- No. of episodes: 130

Production
- Executive producer: Daniel Camhi
- Producers: Ana Urquidi; Epigmenio Ibarra; Carlos Payán
- Cinematography: Damián Aguilar; Miguel Del Valle Prieto
- Editor: Horacio Valle
- Camera setup: Multi-camera
- Production company: Argos Comunicación

Original release
- Network: Cadenatres
- Release: 13 February – 12 August 2012

Related
- El octavo mandamiento

Infames is a Mexican telenovela that premiered on 13 February 2012, and concluded on 12 August 2012. It's a Spin-off of the telenovela El octavo mandamiento. The series is stars Vanessa Guzmán, Luis Roberto Guzmán, Miguel Ángel Muñoz, and Ximena Herrera.

== Cast ==
=== Starring ===
- Vanessa Guzmán as Ana Leguina / Preciado
- Luis Roberto Guzmán as Porfirio Cisneros
- Miguel Ángel Muñoz as Joaquín Navarro / José María "Chema" Barajas
- Ximena Herrera as Dolores "Lola" Medina / Sara Escalante

=== Also starring ===
- Lisette Morelos as Sol Fuentes
- Eréndira Ibarra as Casilda Barreiro
- Carlos Torrestorija as Juan José Benavides
- Juan Ríos Cantú as Ignacio Cabello
- Andrés Montiel as Emilio Ferreira
- Bianca Calderón as Claudia de Benavides
- Ruy Senderos as Ricardo "Ricky" Benavides
- Nicolás Krinis as Javier Peregrino
- Aldo Gallardo as Felipe Sánchez Trejo
- Aurora Gil as Amanda Ortíz
- Juan Martín Jauregui as Daniel Herrera
- Heriberto Méndez as Luis Navarrete
- Claudia Ramírez as María Eugenia Tequida
- Joaquín Garrido as Leopoldo Rivas

=== Recurring ===
- Lourdes Reyes as Yalda Adam
- Jaime Del Aguila as Tenoch Gómez Lovaina
- Alejandro del Toro as Guardaespaldas Leo
- Citlali Galindo as Antonia Murillo
- Mario Loría as Schmidt
- Marco Treviño as Jorge Antonio Barreiro
- Itahisa Machado as Maura
- Bárbara Singer as Sofía Navarro
