= Vanessa Guzmán =

Mexican actress and model

- Born: Vanessa Guzmán Niebla; October 19, 1976 (age 49); Mexico City, Mexico
- Occupations: Actress; model
- Height: 1.78 m (5 ft 10 in)
- Spouse(s): Eduardo Rodríguez (divorced); Uberto Bondoni (2006-2017)
- Children: 2
- Beauty pageant titleholder
- Title: Nuestra Belleza México 1995
- Major competitions: Nuestra Belleza Chihuahua 1995; (Winner); Nuestra Belleza México 1995; (Winner); Miss Universe 1996; (Top 6)
- Website: http://www.vanessaguzman.com

Vanessa Guzmán Niebla (born October 19, 1976 in Mexico City) is a Mexican actress, model and beauty pageant titleholder. She was Nuestra Belleza México in 1995, and represented her country in the 1996 Miss Universe pageant.

== Biography ==
Vanessa Guzmán was born in Mexico City, Mexico, and at age 4 moved with her family to Ciudad Juárez, Chihuahua, Mexico. In 1995, she competed for the title of Nuestra Belleza Chihuahua (Miss Chihuahua), a title which she ended winning. After having won such title, she competed in Mexico's national beauty pageant Nuestra Belleza México; she was crowned Miss Mexico and went on to represent her country in Miss Universe 1996. She made the top six in the pageant and placed 5th overall. Just a short time after having returned from competing for the title, she received several offers to star in a number of television programs. She accepted the offer to co-host Al Ritmo de la Noche, alongside Jorge Ortiz de Pinedo.

In 1999, she received her first role as an actress in a telenovela; Tres Mujeres (1999), Carita de Ángel (2000), Siempre te Amaré (2000), Aventuras en el Tiempo and Entre el Amor y el Odio are a number of works the actress has participated in. Other works made by Guzmán include the radionovela La Herencia, as well as appearing Mi Mujer se llama Mauricio and the film 16 en la Lista. The actress married, then divorced, actor Eduardo Rodriguez, with whom she had a son. In 2004, she participated in the production of Lucero Suárez titled Amar Otra Vez, where she gave life to the character of Verónica. Her latest appearance was in Alborada (2005). In 2006, she traveled to Argentina, where she began working on a telenovela named Amor Mío. She returned to Argentina in 2007 to work on the second season of Amor Mío and married current husband Uberto Bondoni, with whom she had a son in 2008. Vanessa recently appeared on the cover of the magazine H Para Hombres.

== Filmography ==
Film roles
Year	Title	Roles	Notes
1998	16 en la lista	Denisse	

Television roles
Year	Title	Roles	Notes
1998–1999	Camila	Fabiola	Recurring role
1999–2000	Tres mujeres	Carolina Fontaner	Recurring role
2000	Siempre te amaré	Sabina Reyes Castellanos	Recurring role
2000	Amigos x siempre	Barbie	Guest role
2000–2001	Carita de ángel	Gilda Esparza	55 episodes
2001–2006	Mujer, Casos de la Vida Real	Various roles	14 episodes
2001	Aventuras en el tiempo	Faby Wolf	Series regular
2002	Entre el amor y el odio	Juliana Valencia Montes	Series regular
2004	Amar otra vez	Verónica Santillán Vidal	Series regular
2005	Otro rollo	Herself	Episode "Historia en diez"
2005–2006	Alborada	Perla	Series regular
2006–2008	Amor mío	Abríl Juárez Casadiego	Main role; 152 episodes
2009–2010	Atrévete a soñar	Ana Castro	Main role; 261 episodes
2012	Infames	Ana Leguina	Main role
2019–2020	Soltero con hijas	Victoria Robles	Main role

Awards and achievements
Preceded by (Puerto Rico) Desiree Lowry	Miss Universe 4th Runner-Up; 1996	Succeeded by (Italy) Denny Méndez
Preceded by Luz María Zetina	Nuestra Belleza México; 1995	Succeeded by Rebeca Tamez
Preceded by Luz María Delgado	Nuestra Belleza Chihuahua; 1996	Succeeded by Banelly Carrasco
