= Liz Gallardo =

Mexican actress

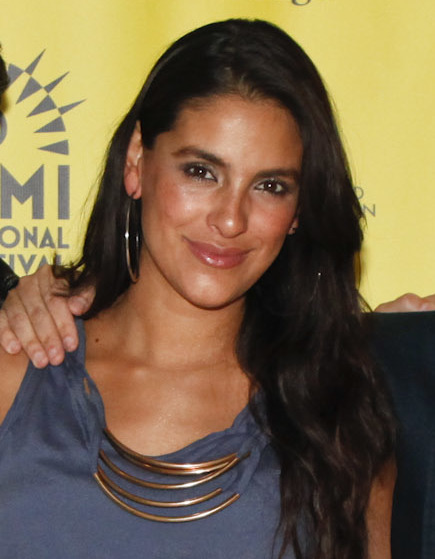
- Gallardo in 2013
- Born: November 28, 1979 (age 46); Guadalajara, Jalisco, Mexico
- Years active: 2001–present

Liz Gallardo (born November 28, 1979) is a Mexican television actress, became known for her role as Tania in the film El búfalo de la noche.

== Filmography ==
=== Film ===
Year	Title	Role	Notes
2004	Cuatro labios	Herself	Documentary
2007	El búfalo de la noche	Tania	
2008	Mancora	La mexicana	
2009	La última y nos vamos	Lucía	
2010	El Parto	Elizabeth	Short film
2010	Seres: Génesis	Emma	
2012	La Cama	Blanquita	
2013	Cinco de Mayo	Citlali	
2013	Reencarnación: Una historia de amor	Yolanda	
2013	Biodegradable	Rosa	
2015	Las Aparicio	Julia Aparicio	Direct-to-DVD
2024	The Perfect Club		

=== Television ===
Year	Title	Role	Notes
2001	Como en el cine	Rocío	Television debut
2004	Prisionera	Monalisa García	
2004	Anita no te rajes	Young Rosario "Chayo" Guerrero	
2005	La ley del silencio	Manuela	
2006	Decisiones	Daisy	2 episodes
2006	Marina	María	
2007	Tiempo final	Ana	Episode: "La despedida"
2007	Tómalo suave	Jenny	Television film
2009	Vuélveme a querer	Nora Mejía	
2010	Las Aparicio	Julia Aparicio	Main role
2011	Una Maid en Manhattan	Leticia "Lety" Robles	Recurring role
2014	Camelia La Texana	Concepción Olvera / La Cuquis	Recurring role; 14 episodes
2015–2016	Bajo el mismo cielo	María Solís Martínez	Recurring role; 115 episodes
2016	Drunk History	Frida Kahlo	Episode: "Yerno Incómodo, Trotsky en México, Hidalgo contra Allende"
2016	Las amazonas	Montserrat	Recurring role; 39 episodes
2016	Un día cualquiera	Emi / Edith	2 episodes
2016	La candidata	Unknown role	3 episodes
2017	Su nombre era Dolores, la Jenn que yo conocí	Graciela Beltrán	Recurring role; 5 episodes
2017	En tierras salvajes	Silvia	Recurring role; 25 episodes
2017	Caer en tentación	Gabriela	Recurring role; 15 episodes
2018	Diablo Guardián	Noemí	3 episodes
2019	Doña Flor y sus dos maridos	Mariana Santos Cruz	Main cast
2021-2022	Madre sólo hay dos	Terese	Main cast
2024	El amor no tiene receta	Filipa Guerra Alvarado	Main cast
2024	Los 50	Herself	Contestant; 3 episodes
