= Las Aparicio =

- Genre: Telenovela
- Created by: Leticia López Margalli; Verónica Bellver
- Starring: Gabriela de la Garza; Ximena Rubio; Liz Gallardo; María del Carmen Farías
- Country of origin: Mexico
- Original language: Spanish
- No. of seasons: 1
- No. of episodes: 120

Production
- Producer: Argos Comunicación

Original release
- Network: Cadena Tres
- Release: April 15 – October 15, 2010

Las Aparicio is a Mexican TV series, the first one produced by Argos Comunicación for Cadena Tres. It was released on April 19, 2010 and ended on October 15 of that year, being composed of 120 episodes. Episodes are streamed on mun2.

== Synopsis ==
In Mexico City lives a family composed of women only, where births are usually single girls and whose husbands die suddenly.

The family consists of six women. Rafaela is the matriarch who has had three husbands, all dead. Alma, the eldest, is the widow of Maximo, whose memory is like a mirage to her and her mother. Mercedes, the middle one, is a lawyer who seeks justice and equality in all its meaning. Julia, the youngest of the three daughters, has doubts about her sexual orientation. Ileana, daughter of Alma, is against everything her mother does. Isadora, the daughter of Mercedes, just wants to know why there are only women in the family.

The lives of these women change with the arrival of Leonardo, a man who investigates the "Curse of Las Aparicio" and finds in Alma the ideal woman.

== Cast ==
- Gabriela de la Garza as Alma Aparicio.
- Ximena Rubio as Mercedes Aparicio.
- Liz Gallardo as Julia Aparicio.
- María del Carmen Farías as Rafaela Aparicio.
- Plutarco Haza as Leonardo Villegas.
- Eduardo Victoria as Claudio.
- Marco Treviño as Máximo.
- Erik Hayser as Alejandro López Cano.
- Lourdes Villarreal as Aurelia.
- Eréndira Ibarra as Mariana Almada.
- Aurora Gil as Mara.
- Silvia Carusillo as Isabel
- Paulina Gaitán as Ileana.
- Eva Sophía Hernández as Isadora.
- Alexandra de la Mora as Karla.
- Tania Angeles as Dani.
- Nestor Rodolfo as Tomas.
- Mario Pérez de Alba as Armando.
- Román Walter as Jorge.
- Johanna Murillo as Viviana.
- Damián Alcázar as Hernán, papá de Mariana.
- Raúl Méndez as Manuel.
- Marianela Cataño as Lucia.
- Oscar Olivares as Miguel.
- Gabriel Chauvet as "rockero mutante 1".
- Diego López as "Rockero mutante 2".

== Awards ==
- FyMTI 2010 awards (Argentina)

- Best telenovela
- Better integrated production
- Best Author: Leticia Lopez and Veronica Maragalli Bellver
- Best Director: Rodrigo Curiel and Moisés Ortiz Urquidi
- Best leading actress: Gabriela de la Garza
