= Luis Roberto Guzmán =

Puerto Rican actor known for his roles in the telenovelas

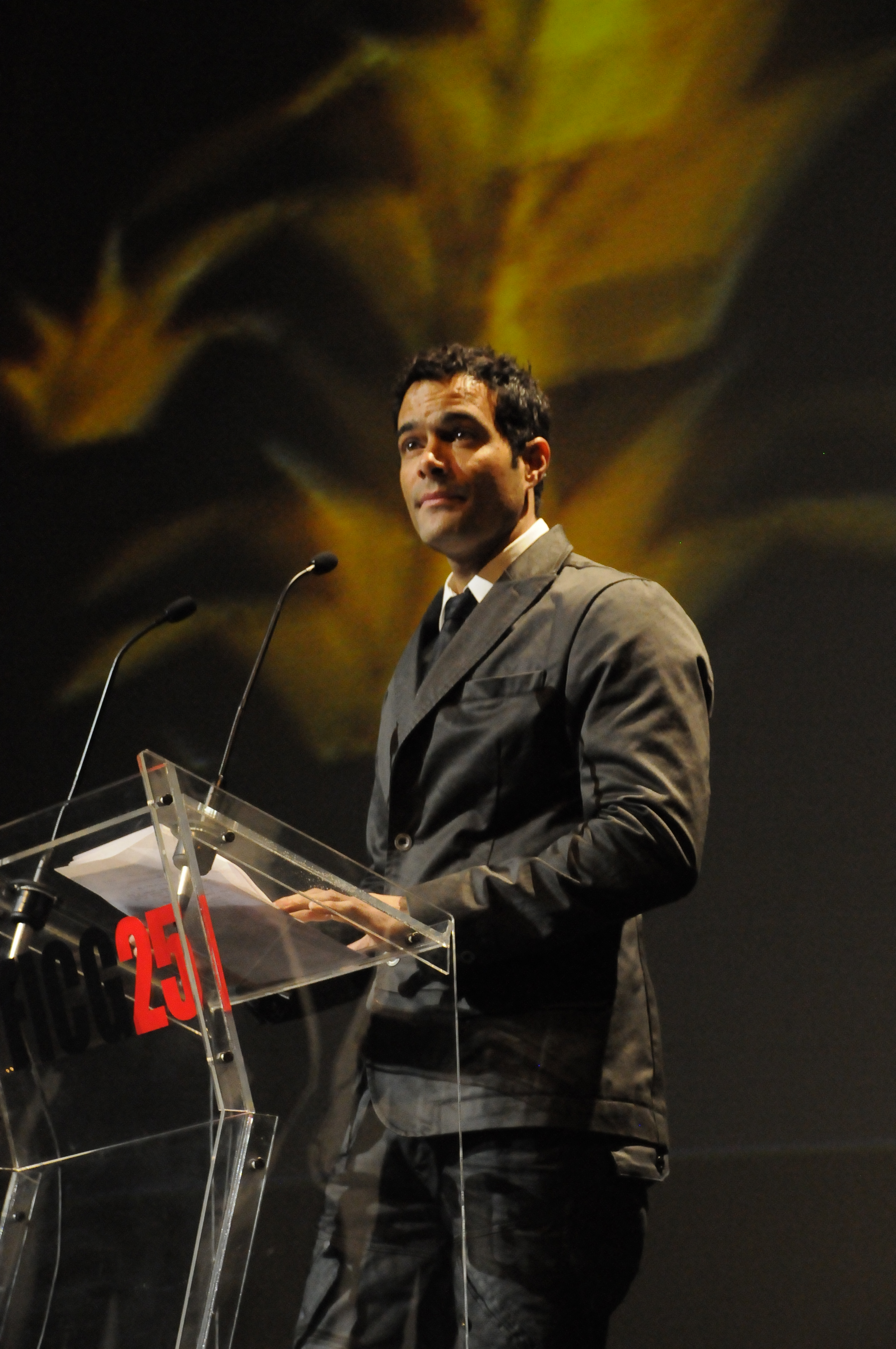
- Born: April 9, 1973 (age 53); Bayamón, Puerto Rico
- Occupation: Actor
- Years active: 1998–present

Luis Roberto Guzmán (born April 9, 1973) is a Puerto Rican actor known for his performances in Mexican telenovelas including Alborada, and for his title role in Mexican series El Pantera. Guzmán worked on the film Ladies' Night in 2003.

Early in his life Guzmán wanted to enter Menudo, but was unable to do it, eventually forming friendships with several former members. He subsequently studied in the University of Puerto Ricoʻs campus in Río Piedras. After completing his studies in the institutionʻs Department of Drama, Guzmán moved to Mexico in 1999.

In Mexico, Guzmán received a contract with Televisa.

On June 26, 2013, it was confirmed that Luis Roberto Guzmán (along with Angelique Boyer and Sebastián Rulli) would star in Angelli Nesma's Lo Que La Vida Me Robó, a remake of Ernesto Alonso's Bodas de odio produced in 1983.

== Filmography ==
=== Films ===
| Year | Title | Role | Notes |
|---|---|---|---|
| 1998 | Flores de la noche | Tommy | Television film |
| 1999 | Amores como todos los demás | | Television film |
| 2002 | Acosada | Hombre del overol | |
| 2003 | Ladies' Night | Roco | |
| 2007 | Gente bien, atascada | | Short film |
| 2008 | Divina confusión | Baco | |
| 2009 | Amar a morir | Luis Ro | |
| 2010 | Hilos y cables | | Short film |
| 2010 | Sin ella | Gastón Sánchez | |
| 2011 | La otra familia | Chema | |

=== Television ===
| Year | Title | Role | Notes |
|---|---|---|---|
| 2000 | Siempre te amaré | Alfredo | |
| 2001 | Amigas y rivales | Frank | |
| 2001 | Sin pecado concebido | Álvaro Godoy | |
| 2002 | Entre el amor y el odio | Gabriel Moreno | |
| 2004 | Alegrijes y rebujos | Bruno Reyes | |
| 2005 | Mujeres | Boris | |
| 2005-2006 | Alborada | Diego Arellano Conde de Guevara | |
| 2007-2009 | El Pantera | Gervasio Robles "El Pantera" | |
| 2011 | Mentes en Shock | Román Moro | |
| 2012 | Infames | Porfirio Cisneros | |
| 2013 | La promesa | Juan Lucas Esguerra | |
| 2013-2014 | Lo que la vida me robó | José Luis Álvarez | |
| 2014-2015 | La Viuda Negra | Ángel Escurdero | |
| 2017 | Ingobernable | Pete Vázquez | |
| 2018 | Narcos: Mexico | Falcón | |
| 2020 | La mexicana y el güero | René Fajardo | |
| 2021 | ¿Quién mató a Sara? | Lorenzo Rossi | |
| 2022 | Cobra Kai | Hector Salazar | |
| 2023 | Tierra de esperanza | Marco Rivas | |

== See also ==
- List of Puerto Ricans
