= Incorregibles de Santa Martha =

- Genre: Comedy drama
- Created by: Carlos Murguía; Eduardo Murguía
- Written by: Fercho Nolla; Kevin Bertram; Claudio Herrera; Alfredo Ballestros; Sergio Adrián Sánchez
- Directed by: Erika Morales Cantú; Roger Iván Cámara; Robby Chapa Ceballos
- Starring: Pepe Olivares; Omar Isfel; Sofía Zavala; Ana Saenz; Armida Monjardin; Samuel Andaluz; Alexander Colmenares; Isabela Coppel; Manzano
- Country of origin: Mexico
- Original language: Spanish
- No. of seasons: 2
- No. of episodes: 88

Production
- Executive producers: Carlos Murguía; Eduardo Murguía
- Production company: TelevisaUnivision

Original release
- Network: Canal 5
- Release: 11 November 2024 – 7 March 2025

Incorregibles de Santa Martha is a Mexican comedy drama television series created by Carlos Murguía and Eduardo Murguía. The series follows a group of troubled students enrolled in the Santa Martha Institute, a school that promises to reform them with their own particular technique. It stars Pepe Olivares, Omar Isfel, Sofía Zavala, Ana Saenz, Armida Monjardin, Samuel Andaluz, Alexander Colmenares, Isabela Coppel and Manzano. The series premiered on Canal 5 on 11 November 2024. The second season premiered on 27 January 2025.

== Cast ==
=== Main ===
- Pepe Olivares as Máximo Gorostieta
- Omar Isfel as Luis Núñez
- Sofía Zavala as Concepción "Terra" Terrazina
- Ana Saenz as Serena Mortz
- Armida Monjardin as Margarita "Bit" Baeley
- Samuel Andaluz as Jaime Contreras
- Alexander Colmenares as Fernando Massan III
- Isabela Coppel as Zoé Rodarte
- Manzano as Benito "Bebé" Berlanga

=== Recurring and guest stars ===
- Violeta Isfel as Gloria
- Horacio F. Lazo as Sergey
- Talía Marcela as Suprema
- Siozana Melikian as Mayúscula
- Asher Mansur as Morgan
- Alma Dávila as Gema
- Johanna Dávila as Melisa
- Lion Bagnis as Gato
- Ana Luisa Monjarás as Anita
- Michel García as Mike
- Berenice Mastretta as Segismunda
- Haunani Ruiz as Melatonina
- Alejandra Maldonado as Ema Globina
- Alejandro Raffel as Dr. Pepe
- Gastón Filgueira Oria as Eco
- Jorge Martos as Pedro
- Silvia Mendoza as Begoña
- Judith Urdiales as Amaranta
- Adriana Burgos as Beatriz
- Julio Maldonado as Dr. Berlanga
- Ingrid Manjarrez as Arantza Massan
- Karen Alicia as Dora
- Monserrat Curis as Diana
- Alberto Yáñez as Lenin
- Luz Edith Rojas
- Carilu Navarro
- Mau Topete
- Alex Lavallen
- Leticia Texidor
- Alex Cortés
- Regina Velarde
- Elaine Haro como Divina Danna

== Episodes ==
Season	Episodes	Originally released	
Season	Episodes	First released	Last released
1	32	11 November 2024	5 December 2024
2	56	27 January 2025	7 March 2025

=== Season 1 (2024) ===
No. overall	No. in season	Title	Original release date	Mexico viewers (millions)
1	1	"El nuevo"	11 November 2024 (Note: This episode was first released on Vix on 30 October 2024, ahead of its premiere on Canal 5.)	0.72
Luis is a young influencer who has dedicated his time to create content for social media, however, that hasn't prevented him from being expelled from all the schools he attends. So his parents are forced to take him to the Institute of Santa Martha, a school for incorrigible teenagers.
2	2	"Chócalas para siempre"	11 November 2024	0.72
Luis feels lonely at Santa Martha and realizes he wants to belong to a group and have friends, so he tries to get along with the bullies, who are also his roommates, but they say he doesn't have what it takes to belong to their group. In his eagerness to belong to the group, Luis does everything, but without realizing it, his actions harm one of his classmates at the school who was about to be released from there and because of him, he will not be able to.
3	3	"Chicas cableadas"	12 November 2024	0.61
Máximo is determined to reform Luis, so he turns to the school bullies to punish Luis and all those who don't obey the rules. Meanwhile, Bit creates Noa with artificial intelligence to help her find her father, but one of the students ones steals her creation and shows it to the other students in the school.
4	4	"La influencer"	12 November 2024	0.61
Máximo asks Luis to take care of his niece, Divina Danna, one of the biggest influencers in Mexico. What Luis doesn't know, is that Danna has attended the Santa Martha Institute before, as Terra recognizes her and reminds her that her real name is Yaretzi Guadalupe. Terra and Danna fight for Luis' attention, but Danna ends up taking him to her photoshoot. The fight between Terra and Danna ends in a revelation about Terra's feelings.
5	5	"Rambina"	13 November 2024	0.59
The students take a field trip to a real prison, so that they can appreciate the facilities of the school and not compare it to a prison. Meanwhile, Gamaliel, Mike and Jaime take care of Máximo's mother after getting the highest grade on an exam.
6	6	"Héroes y villanos"	13 November 2024	0.59
After fainting from being hit by a ball, Bebé's parents visit him, but when they realize it's nothing serious, they quickly leave. This disappoints Bebé and Serena realizes that he wants some attention from his parents and tries to convince him that bullying is not the way to be respected. In order to change his behavior, Bebé asks for Jaime's help.
7	7	"Mademoiselle Serena"	14 November 2024	0.30
Máximo asks Serena to give a French class to the students, but she doesn't know the language and finds out that Segismunda lied on her résumé, because she thought it was not an impressive one and added a few extra things. Fer says a few words in French to Serena and she asks him to be her tutor.
8	8	"Doctor Jaime"	14 November 2024	0.30
During chemistry class a poisonous gas escapes through the school's air vents without anyone noticing. The gas causes an allergy among the students, so everyone crowds the nurse's office. Jorge tells Serena that his parents taught him a few things about "medicine", so he takes on the role of a doctor.
9	9	"Señorita presidenta"	18 November 2024	0.46
Elections are open to elect the Student Council President, after the water park field trip was cancelled because of Bebé, the current president. Terra decides to run for president, but Luis tells her that they should campaign together, as he thinks that this way they could spend more time together. However, Terra rejects him, and Luis decides to run himself.
10	10	"Fer esotérico"	18 November 2024	0.46
The students experience an eclipse and during it Fer makes a wish, which is immediately granted. Fer believes that the eclipse has given him psychic powers that help him see the future. Meanwhile, Terra and Luis notice that Zoé lost her sight due to the eclipse, so they look for a way for her to regain it.
11	11	"Lo tiraron de chiquito"	20 November 2024	N/A
Luis and Fer tease Jaime about his dyslexia and he enters a spelling bee to prove he doesn't have the disorder. Máximo is pressured by his mother to make everything right at Santa Martha. Meanwhile Terra ties herself to a tree in the school, which Máximo wants to cut down after crashing into it.
12	12	"Divide y vencerás"	20 November 2024	N/A
Máximo searches the entire school and finds the answers to the exams under Luis' mattress, but Luis declares his innocence. All the students are angry with Luis, since because of him they will not be able to go out to see their families. Luis is sure that Bebé stole the answers and devises a plan to turn his friends against him.
13	13	"El secreto de Terra"	21 November 2024	0.53
Terra and Bit find the room where the school newspaper "Santa Martha Times" used to be produced and decide to reopen it, but Zoé stays on as editorial director and works alongside Anita on the gossip column. Terra tells Luis one of her biggest secrets, but it comes out in the newspapers. Luis wants to apologize to Terra, but doesn't know how and reveals his secrets to the wrong person and everyone finds out that he is in love with Terra.
14	14	"Manos en la masa"	21 November 2024	0.53
Professor Eco takes a vacation and two new professors arrive at the school to substitute him, but Serena soon discovers that they could be dangerous thieves. Meanwhile, Máximo turns 50 and wants to start living more intensely every day.
15	15	"Papá mío"	22 November 2024	0.30
Santa Martha celebrates 'Bring Your Parent to School' day. Bit searches for her biological father and discovers a shocking truth about her origin. Luis deals with the frustration of remaining in the institute.
16	16	"La dieta de Bebé"	22 November 2024	0.30
Bebé begins to have health issues due to his poor diet and relies on the help of Terra as his strict trainer. Meanwhile, Máximo launches a call to beautify the Santa Martha Institute and Fer wants to make a painting to cover up graffiti made by a vandal.
17	17	"Cápsula del tiempo"	25 November 2024	0.44
The students find a time capsule in their classroom and discover several objects that were kept there by former students. Máximo finds the time capsule and remembers everything he did as a student in the institute.
18	18	"Examen vocacional"	25 November 2024	0.44
Máximo gives the students the results of their aptitude tests and, except for a few, they are satisfied with the results. Luis receives the news that his calling is to be a teacher and he does everything possible to prove that this is not the case. Serena informs Terra that her aptitude test indicates that she will be a housewife, but she imagines a life at Luis' side.
19	19	"Adiós abuelita"	26 November 2024	0.31
Jaime's parents arrive at Santa Martha and soon become teachers at the school and also confess to him that his grandmother has died, leaving him shocked.
20	20	"El cumple de Zoé"	26 November 2024	0.31
Zoé confesses that it is her birthday and she has never had a party, so Serena does everything she can to make her dream come true. Máximo agrees to have a party and celebrates Zoé in a grand way.
21	21	"El fuego de Terra"	29 November 2024	0.42
An accident in the lab brings Luis and Terra closer, who try to have a date but are interrupted by Jaime. Fer becomes the funny one of the group, and Terra, insecure about her physical appearance, receives the support of her friends.
22	22	"El misil del Pentágono"	29 November 2024	0.42
Jaime and Bit try to hack into Máximo's computer to improve his grades, but Jaime accidentally spills coffee on the keyboard, causing all the students' grades to drop to zeros. Fer plays the triangle in the orchestra, and Segismunda tries to re-educate Bebé.
23	23	"El club del almohadazo"	29 November 2024	0.42
Luis joins the Fluff Club, an underground fight club, to impress Terra and challenges El Dragón, the champion. Meanwhile, Sergey, Serena, Eco and Melatonina get trapped in the storage room.
24	24	"Esposados"	29 November 2024	0.42
Morgan handcuffs Luis and Terra so they can resolve their differences. Luis reveals to Terra that he asked Morgan for a favor and that handcuffing them was the result.
25	25	"Las mini Olimpiadas"	2 December 2024	N/A
Santa Martha faces its rival school, Santa María, in the Mini Olympics. Güicho, Terra's ex-boyfriend, is the captain of Santa María's team, which makes Luis jealous.
26	26	"Nosotros los incorregibles"	2 December 2024	N/A
Máximo enters Santa Martha in a film festival, adapting his favorite film Nosotros los Pobres. Luis and Bebé compete for the role of Pepe el Toro, and Terra faces her own challenges as La Chorreada.
27	27	"El Terminador"	3 December 2024	0.39
Bit devises a lie detector that causes conflicts and confessions in Santa Martha. Luis and Terra's feelings are revealed.
28	28	"Romeo y Bit"	3 December 2024	0.39
The students put on Romeo and Juliet and many of them struggle with their insecurities.
29	29	"Chica chismosa"	4 December 2024	0.39
The "Gossip Girl" wreaks havoc on Santa Martha with rumors. Terra, Zoé, and Jaime face embarrassing gossip, while Bit and Anita decide to investigate further.
30	30	"Pequeña Miss Santa Martha"	4 December 2024	0.39
Máximo and the teachers organize the "Little Miss Santa Martha" contest. Terra and Luis try to sabotage it but end up participating.
31	31	"El divorcio"	5 December 2024	N/A
Luis's parents visit Santa Martha and reveal their marital conflicts. With the help of his friends, Luis organizes a dinner to reconcile them.
32	32	"Cambio de roomies"	5 December 2024	N/A
Tired of his roommates, Luis tries to change rooms by manipulating Sergey, the only one with the power to move students from one room to another. Terra and Bit find themselves embroiled in a conflict with Anita.

=== Season 2 (2025) ===
No. overall	No. in season	Title	Original release date	Mexico viewers (millions)
33	1	"Almas gemelas"	27 January 2025 (Note: This episode was first released on Vix on 13 January 2025, ahead of its premiere on Canal 5.)	1.01
Luis wants to win Terra's affection, but she's not sure she'll share the same feelings beyond a friendship. Bit's app pairs her with Anita, who admits to manipulating the results.
34	2	"¿Debate de quién?"	27 January 2025	1.01
It's debate day in Santa Martha. Luis and Terra debate feminism, which creates tension in their relationship due to certain differences between them; Jaime and Bebé debate quesadillas, while Bit tries to change her appearance to please Jaime.
35	3	"Bitamor"	28 January 2025	0.83
Bit suggests a polyamorous relationship with Jaime and Gama Torres, an old boyfriend. A jealous Jaime seeks advice from his friends on what to do.
36	4	"Fer se va"	28 January 2025	0.83
Seeking to improve their political reputation, Fer's adoptive parents plan to remove him from Santa Martha, although Fer ends up confronting them and with the help of Serena, Jaime and Luis, he will try to stay at the school.
37	5	"Réquiem por un hámster"	30 January 2025	0.95
Fer hallucinates about Mozart after an allergic reaction and is inspired to compose a school hymn. A misunderstanding leads to Luis being treated as a "dying man" by his friends, who organize events in his honor.
38	6	"El juego del ostión"	30 January 2025	0.95
Sergey takes charge of the school after Máximo takes a vacation; Morgan organizes the "Oyster Game," and Fer, ignored by the others, joins Morgan in sabotaging the game.
39	7	"Gloria en Santa Martha"	31 January 2025	0.92
Gloria, Luis's mother, decides to work at the Santa Martha cafeteria, which ends up causing her son so much shame that he does everything possible to get her to quit.
40	8	"Santa Martha: El documental"	31 January 2025	0.92
Máximo forces the students to participate in a school documentary. Luis initially resists, but gives in under threat. Terra negotiates her participation, and Anita collaborates for exclusives, while Sergey maintains control through intimidation.
41	9	"Juego de galletas"	3 February 2025	0.78
Twins Melisa and Gema illegally sell cookies to avoid being separated, while Terra gives impromptu cooking classes and Luis organizes bets. Serena discovers the plan and decides to help, but Sergey intervenes.
42	10	"La admiradora de Bebé"	3 February 2025	0.78
Bebé receives anonymous love letters, and an interested Luis decides to track down the secret admirer.
43	11	"Anita embarazada"	4 February 2025	0.72
Anita pretends to be pregnant at a school function, sparking a wave of rumors throughout the school.
44	12	"Fuera máscaras"	4 February 2025	0.72
A school event reveals secrets and causes tension among students.
45	13	"Cortados"	5 February 2025	0.79
The breakup between Luis and Anita divides the group of students.
46	14	"La serenata"	5 February 2025	0.79
Fer organizes a serenade for Serena, but plans get complicated.
47	15	"La tusa"	6 February 2025	0.75
Anita suffers from heartbreak and her friends try to cheer her up with chaotic methods.
48	16	"El examen"	6 February 2025	0.75
An exam tests the friendship between Luis, Fer and Jaime.
49	17	"El comercial"	7 February 2025	0.56
Santa Martha becomes a publicity set and students compete for fame.
50	18	"¿Quién mando la foto?"	7 February 2025	0.56
A compromising photo causes chaos in Santa Martha. Luis and his best friends discover the culprit.
51	19	"El puente"	10 February 2025	N/A
Luis and Terra are punished for a prank gone wrong. There, the couple shares moments that strengthen their relationship.
52	20	"Escape a la derrota"	10 February 2025	N/A
A football match unites the Rechas, who face several obstacles during the match.
53	21	"Verdad o reto"	11 February 2025	N/A
The students spend time playing "truth or dare?," and the situation escalates as secrets and tensions between them are revealed.
54	22	"Los 15 años de Terra"	11 February 2025	N/A
Terra's grandmother gives her old quinceanera dress with a letter mentioning that celebrating a quinceanera isn't contrary to social justice. However, Terra isn't enthusiastic about it, considering this type of celebration to be sexist.
55	23	"Enferma de poder"	12 February 2025	N/A
Serena takes control of Santa Martha after Mayúscula's absence, and puts aside her characteristic softness to act as an authoritarian teacher, which sparks a student revolt.
56	24	"Santa Martha sport bar"	12 February 2025	N/A
The students watch a Mexico national football team match secretly from Máximo and the teachers. To avoid missing the tournament final, they'll try to escape from school at the slightest risk.
57	25	"Belleza interior"	13 February 2025	N/A
An epidemic is breaking out in Santa Martha, and some students affected by the disease, such as Anita, Fer, and Zoé, are quarantined.
58	26	"Bailando por un 10"	13 February 2025	N/A
The students meet at a dance competition, where Anita gets Luis to be her partner, although she only does it to make Terra jealous.
59	27	"Jaime salva a Máximo"	17 February 2025	N/A
With the help of Luis and Fer, Jaime manages to save Máximo from a serious accident. Between action and comedy, he demonstrates his courage and loyalty.
60	28	"Amistades peligrosas"	17 February 2025	N/A
A mysterious friendship generates rumors in Santa Martha.
61	29	"Problemas mayúsculos"	18 February 2025	N/A
Because his mother got sick, Máximo is absent from school for a few days, so Mayúscula will do her thing to torment the teachers.
62	30	"El árbol genealógico"	18 February 2025	N/A
Serena assigns the students to create their family tree. Bit uses the assignment to investigate the whereabouts of her biological father, even enlisting the support of her mothers.
63	31	"Mate vs física"	20 February 2025	N/A
A competition between mathematics and ethics divides the students. In it, Bit and Luis face dilemmas, learning about the balance between knowledge and values.
64	32	"De noche todos los pardos son Gato"	20 February 2025	N/A
Following a dream in which she sees herself in a wedding dress marrying with his friend Gato, Bebé senses an attraction toward him. Meanwhile, Uppercase has a plan to take over the school in her own way.
65	33	"Tubazo"	21 February 2025	N/A
Luis leaves Terra hanging on their date at the library for a game of tubazos, and after an argument that follows, he turns to Fer and Jaime to help him reconcile with his partner (again).
66	34	"Como dice el Güicho"	21 February 2025	N/A
Güicho arrives in Santa Martha from Santa María, surprising the students. There, Güicho bonds with Terra, who tries to prevent a possible confrontation between him and Luis, her true love.
67	35	"Si lo sabe dios que lo sepan los Rechas"	24 February 2025	N/A
Luis and Terra try to continue hiding their romance, as dating is still prohibited at the school. They aren't the only ones in this situation, as Sergey and Begoña are supposedly in a relationship.
68	36	"Fer enamorado"	24 February 2025	N/A
Fer is attracted to Serena, and tries to confess it to her regardless of the consequences it would trigger or whether his classmates would make him understand the immorality of falling in love with a teacher.
69	37	"El día de la inclusión"	25 February 2025	N/A
Bebé plans to organize "Inclusion Day" in the school playground as a way to impress Zoé and her mother. Meanwhile, Fer and Anita's relationship grows.
70	38	"La guitarra de Fer"	25 February 2025	N/A
Fer's favorite guitar suddenly disappears, and he's surprised to discover that Anita used it to learn to play. Meanwhile, Morgan learns that his father is in prison, so he decides to close his business; the students will find a way to reopen it.
71	39	"Terminador 2"	26 February 2025	N/A
Jaime's uncle has a last wish in his final days of life, so Jaime will try to help him in any way he can and will even hold the future of the institute in his hands.
72	40	"Recuerdos y galletas"	26 February 2025	N/A
Pepe, the school doctor, reminisces in capital letters about his time as a student at Santa Martha, where he received the opportunity of a lifetime: a scholarship to study at University of Oxford. Meanwhile, twins Melisa and Gema argue about who is the ideal girl for Mike, one of the boys at the school.
73	41	"Amigos y rivales"	27 February 2025	N/A
Serena sends Luis, Terra, Fer, and Anita to the detention room after Fer joked with Luis about his pants; the four students give their versions of the events that led to their detention.
74	42	"Hasta en las mejores familias"	27 February 2025	N/A
The "Paphijos" event takes place in Santa Martha. There, Luis has to deal with his parents youthful attitude, who only wants to have a good time with him.
75	43	"El amor en los tiempos del Maincra"	28 February 2025	N/A
Bit becomes obsessed with Minecraft, and Jaime, with Terra's help, tries to win her back with a special date in the video game.
76	44	"La fiesta"	28 February 2025	N/A
To raise money, Mayúscula organizes a costume party inside Santa Martha, where she'll also celebrate her birthday. However, what was originally intended to be a party for just 10 people turns into chaos. Jaime becomes jealous when Brit tells him that Gama, her polyamorous boyfriend, will be attending the school.
77	45	"Fuera de lugar"	28 February 2025	N/A
Terra is assigned as the coach of the football team. The other students name Güicho captain, something Luis opposes, so he prevents Güicho from playing in the final match against the Santa María team.
78	46	"La caída de los dos leones"	3 March 2025	N/A
This episode follows the previous one, revealing that Luis was responsible for Güicho's poisoning and also dealing with the guilt of the team losing the football tournament final after missing a penalty. Seeing a bottle of pills fall out of his backpack, a disappointed Terra tells Luis that their relationship is over.
79	47	"De puras pulgas"	3 March 2025	N/A
Máximo announces that there's a flea infestation in the school building, so he evacuates the students to the courtyard. Meanwhile, Luis tries to reconcile with Terra and his classmates, who remain estranged from him because of what happened with Güicho and the football tournament.
80	48	"Máximo fuera"	4 March 2025	N/A
Güicho receives a scholarship to study at a prestigious school in Germany, but he can't decide whether to leave or stay in Santa Martha. Meanwhile, Máximo ends up being removed from his position as principal after Mayúscula made him sign some documents (while semi-conscious), thus allowing her to take the position after a trial.
81	49	"Reinado de terror"	4 March 2025	N/A
Luis achieves his goal of having Güicho rejected for the scholarship, but upon learning that Terra was accepted, he decides to devise a plan to prevent her from leaving Santa Martha. Mayúscula imposes a new regime, which she considers more "authoritarian" than her brother's, although this doesn't stop the students from rebelling; she sends Begoña to convince Sergey to return as a teacher.
82	50	"Bromas que matan"	5 March 2025	N/A
The students organize a surprise party for Güicho to celebrate his recovery, and when he isn't invited, Luis plays a practical joke using a helium tank to ruin the party. Máximo is still debating whether to return to Santa Martha or pursue a career as a commercial actor.
83	51	"El memorial"	5 March 2025	N/A
Suprema, the matriarch of the Gorostieta family, dies of a heart attack. Once he's reinstated as principal, Máximo agrees with Mayúscula to hold a memorial at the school, while she has to deal with hallucinations of her late mother. It's revealed that Luis's helium tank prank went so far that he receives a punishment.
84	52	"Mi villano favorito"	6 March 2025	N/A
This episode shows flashbacks of everything the students have experienced for nearly a year in Santa Martha while being interrogated by Begoña. Ironically, they've learned everything except what they saw in class.
85	53	"Adiós Santa Martha"	6 March 2025	N/A
Máximo announces changes at the school, such as allowing cell phones and relaxing the no-relationships policy established by Suprema. Seeing that Luis has had enough of his classmates, Mayúscula and Begoña ask him to steal some documents from the principal's office in exchange for winning back Terra's love. But what Luis didn't know was that the office had cameras that captured him stealing, and he was expelled from Santa Martha.
86	54	"La noche triste"	7 March 2025	N/A
Since leaving Santa Martha, Luis has struggled with nightmares and his parents threaten to enroll him in a military academy. He's realized the mistakes that led his friends to distance themselves from him, so he tries to reconcile with each of them and also seeks to save the school from possible demolition.
87	55	"El dream team"	7 March 2025	N/A
Luis was able to convince his parents not to send him to military academy thanks to some advice Serena had given him, but he's still trying to recover everything he ruined with his attitude, which includes reconciling with Terra, who had also reestablished her relationship with Güicho. When they meet in a parking lot, Luis shows remorse, although to his surprise, Terra tells him that the reason they broke up was because he prioritized his celebrity status.
88	56	"El final"	7 March 2025	N/A
The students, led by Luis, gather to prevent Mayúscula and Begoña from blowing up the Santa Martha building to build a shopping mall. They are not alone in this plan; they are joined by the teachers and Máximo, to whom Luis previously apologized for getting him fired. However, although Máximo was reluctant to return to his position as principal, he agrees with the promise that there will be a "new Santa Martha." Despite the building being detonated, the students and teachers saved the Gorostieta family legacy, choosing to rebuild the school. In the end, Luis and Terra embrace as a sign of reconciliation.

== Release ==
The series premiered on 11 November 2024, on Canal 5. The first ten episodes became available to stream on Vix prior to their televised premieres. The second season premiered on 27 January 2025.

== Ratings ==
Viewership and ratings per season of Incorregibles de Santa Martha
Season	Timeslot (CT)	Episodes	First aired		Last aired		Avg. viewers (millions)
Season	Timeslot (CT)	Episodes	Date	Viewers (millions)	Date	Viewers (millions)	Avg. viewers (millions)
1	Mon–Fri 7:00 p.m.	26	11 November 2024	0.72	5 December 2024	N/A	0.46
2	Mon–Fri 7:00 p.m. (1–18); Mon–Fri 5:00 p.m. (19–56)	18	27 January 2025	1.01	7 March 2025	N/A	0.82
