= 33rd TVyNovelas Awards =

2015 Mexican TV awards

- Date: March 8, 2015
- Location: Mexico City, Mexico
- Hosted by: Galilea Montijo, Andrea Legarreta, Alan Tacher & Adrián Uribe

Highlights
- Most awards: Yo no creo en los hombres (7)
- Most nominations: Yo no creo en los hombres (14)

Television/radio coverage
- Network: Canal de las Estrellas

The 33rd TVyNovelas Awards were an academy of special awards to the best soap operas and TV shows. The awards ceremony took place on March 8, 2015, in Mexico City. The ceremony was televised in Mexico by Canal de las Estrellas and in the United States by Univision.

Galilea Montijo, Andrea Legarreta, Alan Tacher and Adrián Uribe hosted the show. Yo no creo en los hombres won 7 awards, the most for the evening. Lo que la vida me robó won 5 awards, Mi corazón es tuyo won 4 awards, including Best Telenovela, and Qué pobres tan ricos won 2 awards.

== Summary of awards and nominations ==
Telenovela	Nominations	Awards
Yo no creo en los hombres	14	7
Lo que la vida me robó	13	5
El color de la pasión	13	0
Mi corazón es tuyo	11	4
Qué pobres tan ricos	10	2
La malquerida	5	0
La gata	4	0
Quiero amarte	3	0
Por siempre mi amor	1	0

== Winners and nominees ==
=== Telenovelas ===
The Awards for Best Original Story or Adaptation and Best Direction were given on March 6, 2015.

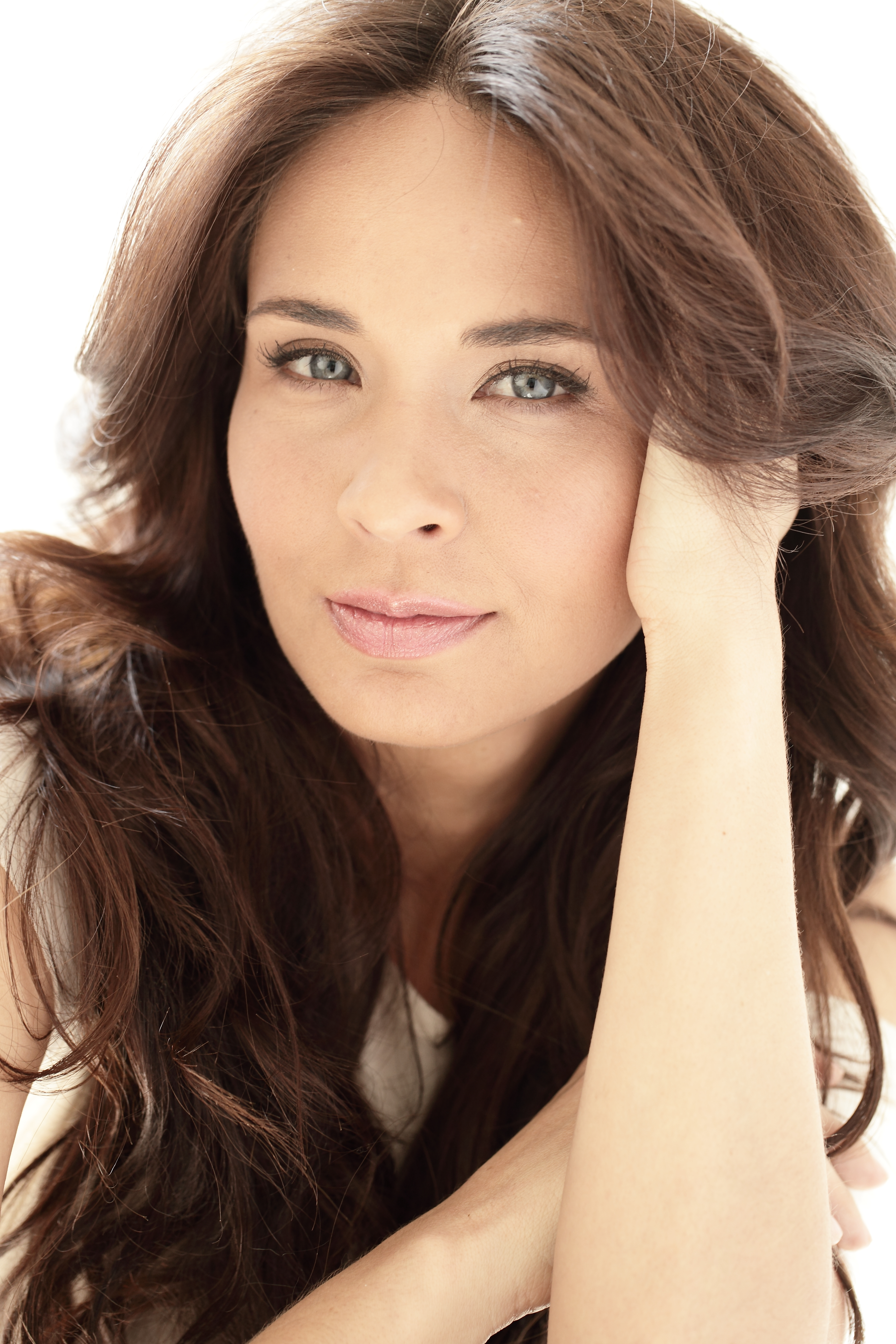
Adriana Louvier, winner for Best Actress

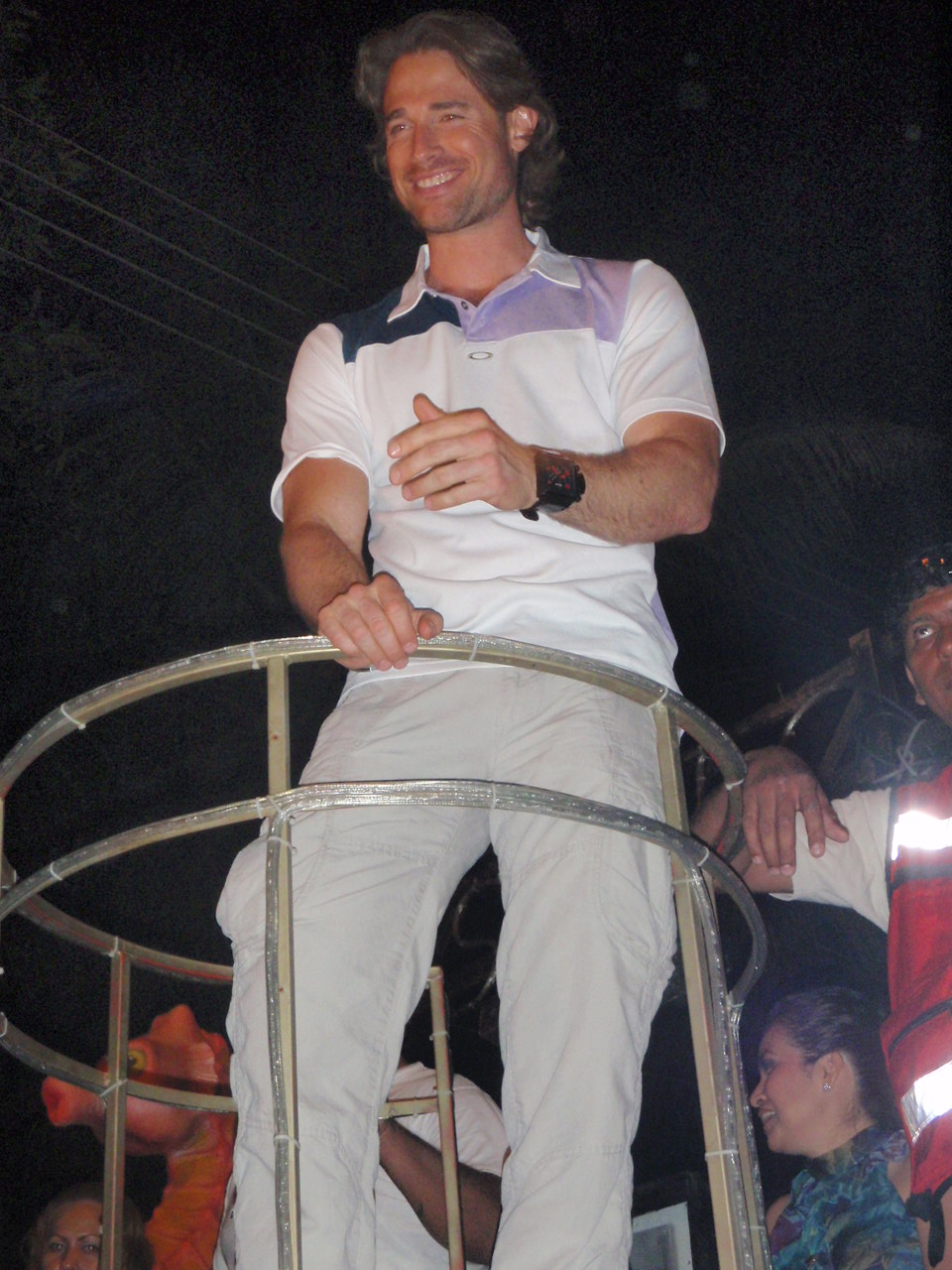
Sebastián Rulli, winner for Best Actor

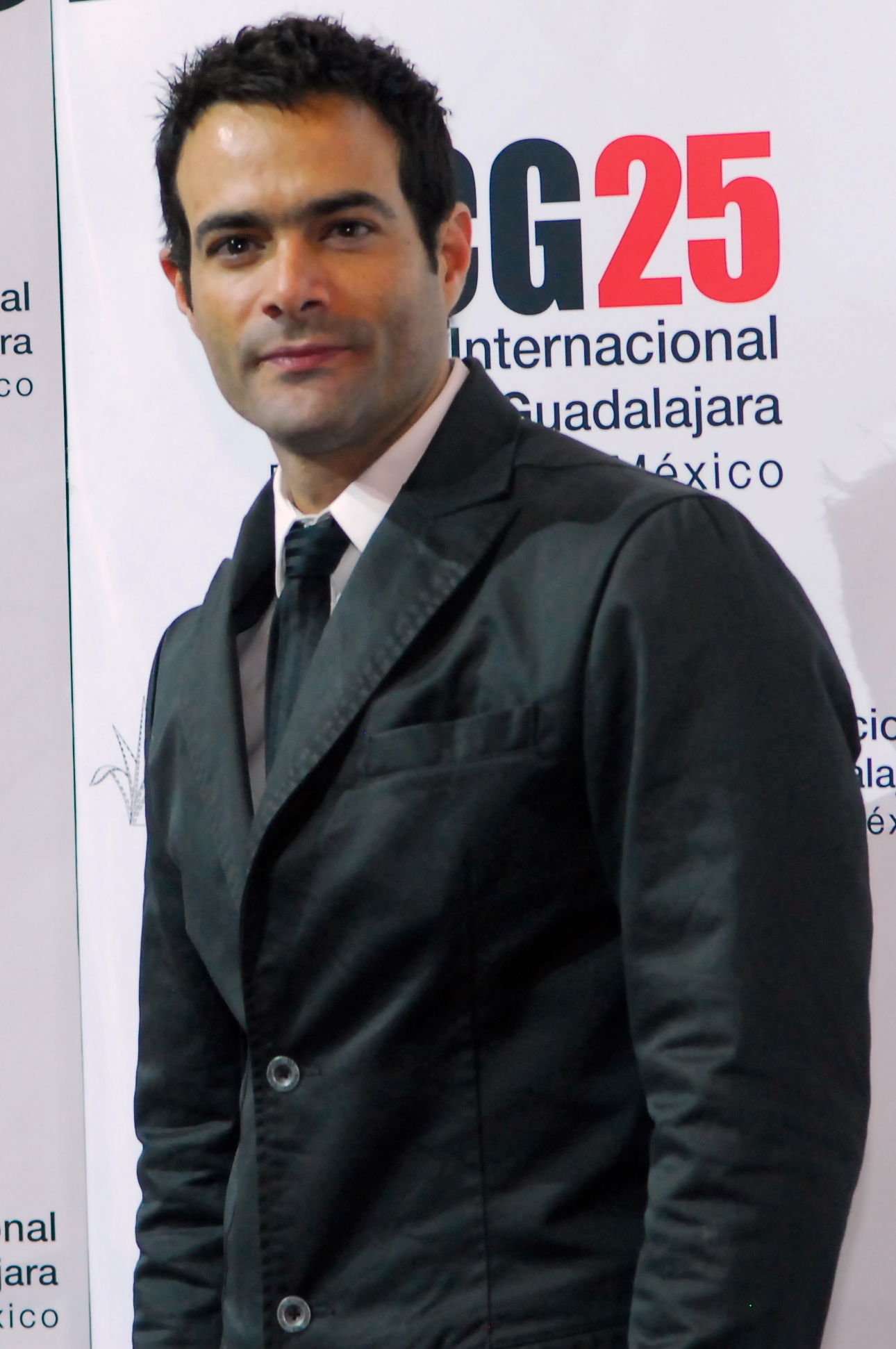
Luis Roberto Guzmán, winner for Best Co-lead Actor

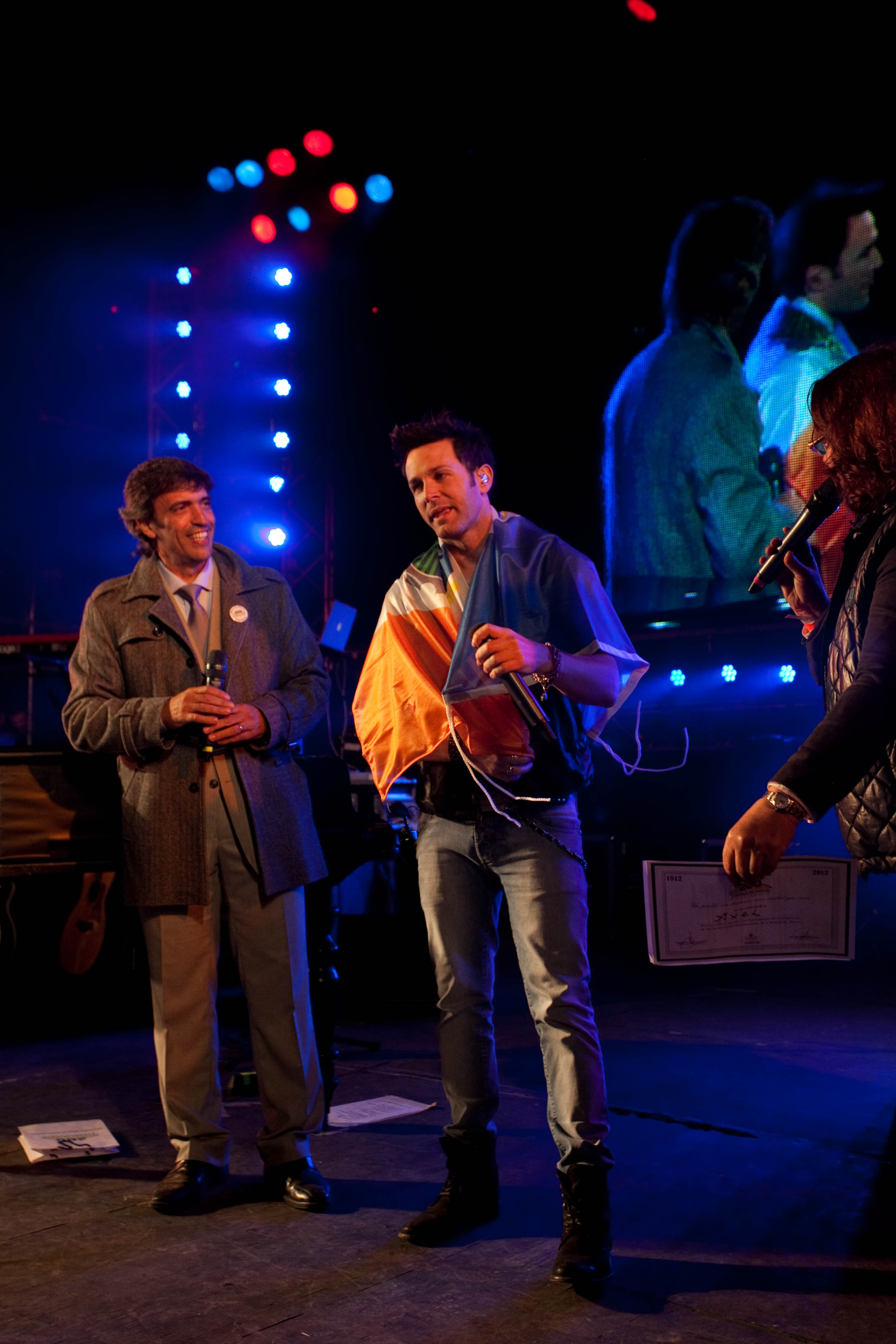
Axel and Kaay, winners for Best Musical Theme

Best Telenovela	Best Multiplatform Telenovela
Mi corazón es tuyo; El color de la pasión; Lo que la vida me robó; Qué pobres tan ricos; Yo no creo en los hombres	Mi corazón es tuyo
Best Actress	Best Actor
Adriana Louvier – Yo no creo en los hombres; Angelique Boyer – Lo que la vida me robó; Ariadne Díaz – La malquerida; Esmeralda Pimentel – El color de la pasión; Maite Perroni – La gata; Zuria Vega – Qué pobres tan ricos	Sebastián Rulli – Lo que la vida me robó; Daniel Arenas – La gata; Erick Elías – El color de la pasión; Gabriel Soto – Yo no creo en los hombres; Jorge Salinas – Mi corazón es tuyo
Best Antagonist Actress	Best Antagonist Actor
Daniela Castro – Lo que la vida me robó; Azela Robinson – Yo no creo en los hombres; Claudia Ramírez – El color de la pasión; Mayrín Villanueva – Mi corazón es tuyo	Flavio Medina – Yo no creo en los hombres; Alberto Estrella – La malquerida; Alexis Ayala – Lo que la vida me robó; Sergio Sendel – Lo que la vida me robó
Best Leading Actress	Best Leading Actor
Rosa María Bianchi – Yo no creo en los hombres; Ana Bertha Espín – Lo que la vida me robó; Helena Rojo – El color de la pasión; Patricia Reyes Spíndola – El color de la pasión	Manuel "Flaco" Ibáñez – Qué pobres tan ricos; José Elías Moreno – Quiero amarte; Manuel Ojeda – La gata; René Casados – Mi corazón es tuyo
Best Co-lead Actress	Best Co-lead Actor
Fabiola Guajardo – Yo no creo en los hombres; África Zavala – La malquerida; Eugenia Cauduro – El color de la pasión; Sylvia Pasquel – Qué pobres tan ricos	Luis Roberto Guzmán – Lo que la vida me robó; Arturo Peniche – Qué pobres tan ricos; Pablo Valentín – El color de la pasión; Patricio Castillo – La gata
Best Supporting Actress	Best Supporting Actor
Cecilia Toussaint – Yo no creo en los hombres; Macaria – Yo no creo en los hombres; Margarita Magaña – Lo que la vida me robó; Tiaré Scanda – Qué pobres tan ricos	Osvaldo Benavides – Lo que la vida me robó; Fabián Robles – La malquerida; Juan Carlos Colombo – Yo no creo en los hombres; Salvador Sánchez – Quiero amarte
Best Young Lead Actress	Best Young Lead Actor
Paulina Goto – Mi corazón es tuyo; Estefanía Villarreal – Yo no creo en los hombres; Michelle Renaud – El color de la pasión; Natasha Dupeyrón – Qué pobres tan ricos	José Eduardo Derbez – Qué pobres tan ricos; Brandon Peniche – La malquerida; Juan Pablo Gil – Mi corazón es tuyo; Pablo Lyle – Por siempre mi amor
Best Musical Theme	Best Original Story or Adaptation
"Mi corazón es tuyo" — Axel and Kaay – Mi corazón es tuyo; "El perdedor" — Enrique Iglesias and Marco Antonio Solís – Lo que la vida me robó; "Hoy es un buen día" — Río Roma - El color de la pasión; "Quiero amarte" — Armando Manzanero, Noel Schajris, Samo, Jesús Navarro, Juan Pablo Manzanero and Carlos Macías – Quiero amarte	Juan Carlos Alcalá, Rosa Salazar and Fermín Zúñiga – Lo que la vida me robó; Aída Guajardo and Felipe Ortíz – Yo no creo en los hombres; Alejandro Pohlenz, Marcia del Río and Ricardo Tejeda – Mi corazón es tuyo; José Cuauhtémoc Blanco and María del Carmen Peña – El color de la pasión
Best Direction	Best Cast
Eric Morales and Xavier Romero – Yo no creo en los hombres; Benjamín Cann and Rodrigo Zaunbos – Qué pobres tan ricos; Francisco Franco and Juan Pablo Blanco – El color de la pasión; Jorge Fons, Aurelio Ávila and Lily Garza – Mi corazón es tuyo	Yo no creo en los hombres; El color de la pasión; Lo que la vida me robó; Mi corazón es tuyo; Qué pobres tan ricos

=== Others ===
Best Unit Program	Best Variety Program
Como dice el dicho; Hermosa esperanza; La rosa de Guadalupe; Laura	Hoy; Estrella2; Sabadazo
Best Restricted TV Program	Best Special Program
Está cañón; Mojoe; STANDparados; SuSana adicción	Grandes temas de telenovela; Bandamax Awards; Chespirito, gracias por siempre; Nuestra Belleza México
Best Entertainment Program	Best Competitions Program
Me caigo de risa; Puedes con 100; Tour nocturno; Zona ruda	La Voz... México; Bailando por un sueño; Karaoke canta y no te rajes; Paranoia total; Vas con todo

== Audience's Favorites ==
The Audience's Favorites were categories that the audience chose through Twitter and the most voted were selected for the next round. Voting took place on the awards' official website. The awards were given on March 6, 2015.

Yo no creo en los hombres won 6 awards, the most for the evening. Other winners Mi corazón es tuyo won 2 awards, including Favorite Finale, and Qué pobres tan ricos won 1 award.

=== Summary of awards and nominations ===
Telenovela	Nominations	Awards
El color de la pasión	12	0
Lo que la vida me robó	11	0
Yo no creo en los hombres	8	6
Mi corazón es tuyo	8	2
Por siempre mi amor	3	0
Qué pobres tan ricos	2	1

=== Winners and nominees ===
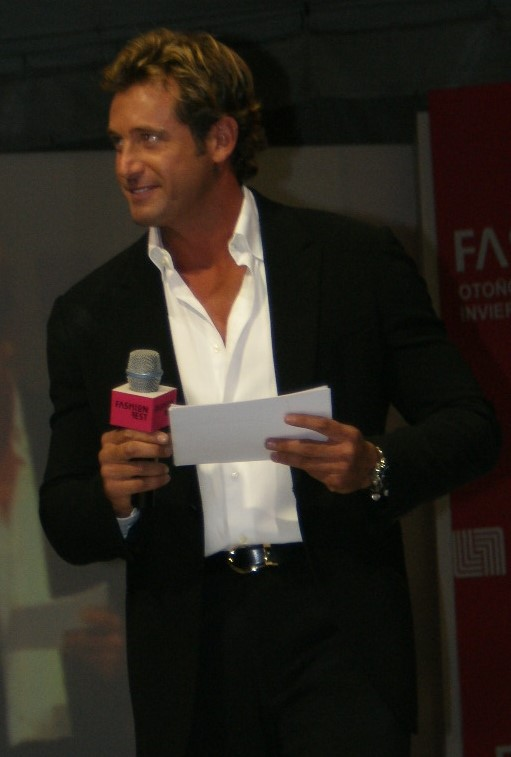
Gabriel Soto, winner as The Most Handsome Man and also in the categories of Favorite Couple and Favorite Kiss (with Adriana Louvier)

The Most Beautiful Woman	The Most Handsome Man
Zuria Vega – Qué pobres tan ricos; Angelique Boyer – Lo que la vida me robó; Esmeralda Pimentel – El color de la pasión; Michelle Renaud – El color de la pasión; Silvia Navarro – Mi corazón es tuyo	Gabriel Soto – Yo no creo en los hombres; Erick Elías – El color de la pasión; Jorge Salinas – Mi corazón es tuyo; Pablo Lyle – Por siempre mi amor; Sebastián Rulli – Lo que la vida me robó
Favorite Female Villain	Favorite Male Villain
Azela Robinson – Yo no creo en los hombres; Claudia Ramírez – El color de la pasión; Daniela Castro – Lo que la vida me robó; Mayrín Villanueva – Mi corazón es tuyo; Rosa María Bianchi – Yo no creo en los hombres	Flavio Medina – Yo no creo en los hombres; Alberto Estrella – Lo que la vida me robó; Alexis Ayala – Lo que la vida me robó; Sergio Sendel – Lo que la vida me robó
Favorite Slap	Favorite Smile
Fabiola Guajardo and Azela Robinson – Yo no creo en los hombres; Claudia Ramírez and Ximena Romo – El color de la pasión; Daniela Castro and Angelique Boyer – Lo que la vida me robó; Eugenia Cauduro and Claudia Ramírez – El color de la pasión; Mayrín Villanueva and Silvia Navarro – Mi corazón es tuyo	Paulina Goto – Mi corazón es tuyo; Erick Elías – El color de la pasión; Esmeralda Pimentel – El color de la pasión; Michelle Renaud – El color de la pasión; Pablo Lyle – Por siempre mi amor
Favorite Kiss	Favorite Couple
Adriana Louvier and Gabriel Soto – Yo no creo en los hombres; Angelique Boyer and Luis Roberto Guzmán – Lo que la vida me robó; Angelique Boyer and Sebastián Rulli – Lo que la vida me robó; Esmeralda Pimentel and Erick Elías – El color de la pasión; Silvia Navarro and Jorge Salinas – Mi corazón es tuyo	Adriana Louvier and Gabriel Soto – Yo no creo en los hombres; Angelique Boyer and Sebastián Rulli – Lo que la vida me robó; Esmeralda Pimentel and Erick Elías – El color de la pasión; Silvia Navarro and Jorge Salinas – Mi corazón es tuyo; Thelma Madrigal and Pablo Lyle – Por siempre mi amor
Favorite Finale
Mi corazón es tuyo; El color de la pasión; Lo que la vida me robó; Qué pobres tan ricos; Yo no creo en los hombres

== In Memoriam ==
- Jorge Arvizu
- Chela Castro
- Júnior (Filipino singer)
- Luis Ernesto Cano
- Sergio Bustamante
- Luis Fernando Muñoz Castro
- Columba Domínguez
- María Eugenia Llamas
- Gustavo Cerati
- Javier Romero
- Aldo Sarabia
- Héctor Arredondo
- Chespirito
- Vicente Leñero
- Lorena Rojas
