= Lenny de la Rosa =

Cuban actor, singer, model and dancer (born 1983)

- Born: Lenny Linel de la Rosa; November 4, 1983 (age 42); La Habana, Cuba
- Occupations: Actor, singer, model, Dancer

Lenny Linel de la Rosa Hernández (born November 4, 1983, La Habana, Cuba) is a Cuban actor, singer, model and dancer currently living in Dallas, Texas.

== Career ==
Lenny de la Rosa began his show business career as a backing vocalist with popular Mexican singer Gloria Trevi. After high school, he studied music at the National School of Arts in Cuba, and later attended the Center for Arts Education (CEA) of Televisa, where he became involved in musical theater through Qué plantón, Pachecas a Belén y Princesas en Pugna. In 2010, he appeared in a telenovela produced by Salvador Mejía, Triunfo del amor, in which he shared the screen with William Levy and Maite Perroni.

In 2013, producer Emilio Larrosa gave de la Rosa the opportunity to participate in a soap opera titled Libre para amarte playing the role of Gerardo "El Gallo" Jiménez, in which he was featured with Gloria Trevi and Gabriel Soto.

In 2014, de la Rosa participated in the television series Bailando por un sueño in Mexico along with Charlene Arian, being the eighth eliminated. Later that same year, he was elected by Giselle González to participate in the telenovela Yo no creo en los hombres in a new adaptation of the soap opera of the same name.

== Filmography ==
Year	Project	Role
2010	Triunfo del amor	Joaquín
2013	Libre para amarte	Gerardo "El Gallo" Jiménez
2014	Bailando por un sueño	Himself
2014–2015	Yo no creo en los hombres	Ari
2015–2016	A que no me dejas	Alexis

== Theater ==
Year	Title	Character
2010	Pachecas a Belén	—
2011	¡Qué plantón!	Mango Petecón
2014	12 princesas en pugna	Repartidor de pizza
