= Flavio Medina =

Mexican actor (born 1971)

- Born: April 19, 1978 (age 48); Mexico City, Mexico
- Occupation: Actor
- Years active: 2006–present

Flavio Medina (Spanish pronunciation: [ˈflaβjo meˈðina]; born April 19, 1978) is a Mexican actor.

== Biography ==
Flavio Medina was born in Mexico City, Mexico, D.F. His first experience with live theater was during his childhood, when the grandson of Juan Grandini invited him to attend several plays at the Teatro de los Insurgentes.

Although his father wanted him to become a medical doctor, Medina studied acting. He attended the CEC Trigger school, and then studied at the National School of Classical Dance (INBA) for three years. He also studied singing.

== Career ==
He appeared in a series of theatrical productions such as Un Rufián en la Escalera, El pelícano, El método Grönholm, Regina, El Enterrador, El Zapatero, Vaselina 2001, Los Tres Sexos de la Luna, Por Amarte Tanto, Silencio Pollos Pelones, Doña Rosita la soltera, La casa de Bernarda Alba, La casa de Hasan, Bagdad, Les Précieuses ridicules and Avenida Q.

He also appeared in musicals like Fama, (with which also travelled to Venezuela, Puerto Rico and the Dominican Republic) Anastasia, Aladino, Pinocho el Musical, Amor sin Barreras, Cabaret and Víctor Victoria.

Medina's stage appearances attracted the attention of film and television producers who cast him in various projects.

He appeared in television productions like Mujer, Casos de la Vida Real, La hora pico], Por un beso and the telenovela Salomé. In 2008, he starred in Alma de Hierro as Amadeo. In 2009 he participated in Depositarios and Háblame and Hidalgo: la historia jamás contada, a film made to mark the bicentennial of Mexican independence. He ended the year with Agosto Condado de Osage.

In 2010 he was cast in the telenovela Para Volver a Amar, playing a man who can not find work in Mexico. In 2012, Medina joined the cast of Carlos Moreno's Amor bravío. He played the ambitious antagonist Alonso Lacazno. He also starred as the antagonist in the telenovela Quiero amarte.

In 2014, he starred in Gisselle González's hit I Don't Trust Men Anymore alongside Adriana Louvier and Gabriel Soto.

== Filmography ==
=== Film roles ===
Year	Title	Roles	Notes
2010	Hidalgo: La historia jamás contada	Mariano	
2013	Inercia	Felipe	
2014	Fachon Models	Jonás	
2014	The Perfect Dictatorship	Salvador Garza	
2014	Las oscuras primaveras	Sandro	
2015	Being or Not Being	Augusto	
2017	El habitante	José Sánchez Lermontov	
2018	Una mujer sin filtro	Gabriel	
2018	The Good Girls	Fernando	
2018	Sonora	Aarón	
2019	Souvenir	Joaquín	
2022	Ojos que no ven	Tomas	
2022	Where Birds Go To Die	Miguel	

=== Television roles ===
Year	Title	Roles	Notes
2004	Santo vs The Clones	Adrián (Voice)	Animated series
2005–2006	Mujer, casos de la vida real	Guest	6 episodes
2008–2009	Alma de hierro	Amadeo	Main role; 389 episodes
2010	Mujeres asesinas	Raúl	Episode: "Irma, la de los peces"
2010–2011	Para volver a amar	David Magaña	Main role; 142 episodes
2011	El Equipo	Eliseo Raya	Main role; 8 episodes
2012	Amor bravío	Alonso Lazcano	Main role; 96 episodes
2013–2014	Quiero amarte	César Montesinos	Main role; 161 episodes
2014–2015	Yo no creo en los hombres	Daniel	Main role; 109 episodes
2015	Yo no creo en los hombres, el origen	Daniel	Television special
2016	Yago	Lucio	Main role; 65 episodes
2018	The Inmate	Jorge Peniche	Main role; 13 episodes
2018	Diablero	Cardenal Morelo	Recurring role; 5 episodes
2019	La Reina del Sur	Zurdo Villa	Main role (season 2); 35 episodes
2019	The House of Flowers	Simón	Recurring role (season 2); 8 episodes
2019	Cuna de lobos	Francisco Larios	Main role; 25 episodes
2019–2020	ZeroZeroZero	Jacinto Leyra	Main role; 5 episodes
2022	Rebelde	Gustavo "Gus" Bauman	Main role (season 2); 8 episodes
2022	Todo va a estar bien	Ruy	Main role; 8 episodes
2023–2025	Isla brava	Alfredo	Main role
2023–2025	Pacto de sangre	Rubén	Main role
2023	Tríada	Eugenio	
2026	El renacer de Luna	Pancho Cadena	Main role

== Awards and nominations ==
Year	Association	Category	Nominated works	Result
2013	31st TVyNovelas Awards	Best Supporting Actor	Amor bravío	Won
2015	33rd TVyNovelas Awards and Favoritos del público	Best Male Antagonist	Yo no creo en los hombres	Won
2015	33rd TVyNovelas Awards and Favoritos del público	Favorite Male Villain	Yo no creo en los hombres	Won
