= TVyNovelas Award for Best Co-lead Actor =

Mexican television award

- Awarded for: Best performance by an actor in a co-leading role
- First award: 1991; Salvador Pineda; Mi pequeña Soledad
- Currently held by: 2020; Arap Bethke; La usurpadora

== Winners and nominees ==
=== 1990s ===
| Winner | Nominated |
9th TVyNovelas Awards
| Salvador Pineda for Mi pequeña Soledad | Héctor Suárez Gomis for Alcanzar una estrella; Luis Xavier for Yo compro esa mujer; Marco Muñoz for Destino; Marcos Valdés for Alcanzar una estrella |
10th TVyNovelas Awards
| Otto Sirgo for Alcanzar una estrella II | Ari Telch for Muchachitas; Raymundo Capetillo for Cadenas de amargura |
~~1993 to 1999~~

=== 2000s ===
| Winner | Nominated |
~~2000 and 2001~~
20th TVyNovelas Awards
| Jorge Poza for El Manantial | Guillermo García Cantú for La intrusa; Luis Roberto Guzmán for Sin pecado concebido |
~~2003 to 2007~~
26th TVyNovelas Awards
| Alejandro Tommasi for Destilando Amor | Eugenio Bartilotti for Yo amo a Juan Querendón; Sebastián Rulli for Pasión |
27th TVyNovelas Awards
| Jorge Poza for Alma de Hierro | Agustín Arana for Palabra de mujer; René Casados for Fuego en la sangre |

=== 2010s ===
| Winner | Nominated |
28th TVyNovelas Awards
| Raúl Araiza for Un gancho al corazón | Gabriel Soto for Sortilegio; Mario Iván Martínez for Mañana es para siempre |
29th TVyNovelas Awards
| Jesús Ochoa for Para volver a amar | Arath de la Torre for Zacatillo, un lugar en tu corazón; David Zepeda for Soy tu dueña; René Casados for Cuando me enamoro |
30th TVyNovelas Awards
| José Ron for La que no podía amar | Alejandro Ibarra for Amorcito corazón; Mark Tacher for Triunfo del amor; Pedro Moreno for Una familia con suerte |
31st TVyNovelas Awards
| Jesús Ochoa for Por ella soy Eva | José Elías Moreno for Amor bravío; Manuel Ojeda for Por ella soy Eva |
32nd TVyNovelas Awards
| Felipe Nájera for Mentir para Vivir | Aarón Hernán for De que te quiero, te quiero; Alejandro Ávila for Porque el amor manda |
33rd TVyNovelas Awards
| Luis Roberto Guzmán for Lo que la vida me robó | Arturo Peniche for Qué pobres tan ricos; Pablo Valentín for El color de la pasión; Patricio Castillo for La Gata |
34th TVyNovelas Awards
| José Pablo Minor for Pasión y poder | Pablo Valentín for Antes muerta que Lichita; Diego Olivera for Hasta el fin del mundo; Alejandro Ibarra for La vecina; Osvaldo de León for Lo imperdonable |
35th TVyNovelas Awards
| Carlos Rivera for El hotel de los secretos | Diego Olivera for Corazón que miente; Ferdinando Valencia for Simplemente María; Juan Pablo Medina for Sin rastro de ti; Rafael Sánchez Navarro for La candidata |
36th TVyNovelas Awards
| Carlos Ferro for Caer en tentación | Adrián Di Monte for La doble vida de Estela Carrillo; Rafael Inclán for Mi marido tiene familia; Raúl Araiza for Papá a toda madre; Carlos de la Mota for Sin tu mirada |
37th TVyNovelas Awards
| Arturo Barba for Amar a muerte | Mario Morán for Hijas de la luna; Rodrigo Murray for Like; José Pablo Minor for Mi marido tiene familia; José María Torre for Por amar sin ley |

=== 2020s ===
| Winner | Nominated |
38th TVyNovelas Awards
| Arap Bethke for La usurpadora | Axel Ricco for Vencer el miedo; Carlos de la Mota for Médicos; Omar Fierro for Cita a ciegas; Polo Morín for La reina soy yo |

== Records ==
- Most awarded actors: Jorge Poza and Jesús Ochoa, 2 times.
- Most nominated actors: Jorge Poza, Luis Roberto Guzmán, René Casados, Jesús Ochoa, Alejandro Ibarra and Pablo Valentín with 2 nominations.
- Actors winning all nominations: Jorge Poza, Jesús Ochoa, and Arturo Barba.
- Most nominated actors without a win: René Casados, Alejandro Ibarra and Pablo Valentín with 2 nominations.
- Younger winner: Jorge Poza, 24 years old.
- Youngest nominee: Héctor Suárez Gomis, 23 years old.
- Oldest winner: Jesús Ochoa, 54 years old.
- Oldest nominee: Aarón Hernán, 84 years old.
- Actor winning after short time: Jesús Ochoa by (Para volver a amar, 2011) and (Por ella soy Eva, 2013), 2 years difference.
- Actor winning after long time: Jorge Poza by (El Manantial, 2002) and (Alma de Hierro, 2009), 7 years difference.
- Actors winning this category, despite having been as a main villain: Salvador Pineda (Mi pequeña Soledad, 1991)
- Actors was nominated in this category, despite having played as a main villain:
  - Guillermo García Cantú (La intrusa, 2002)
  - Agustín Arana (Palabra de mujer, 2009)
  - David Zepeda (Soy tu dueña, 2011)
  - Rafael Sánchez Navarro (La candidata, 2017)
- Foreign winning actors:
  - Otto Sirgo from Cuba
  - Luis Roberto Guzmán from Puerto Rico
