= TVyNovelas Award for Best Telenovela of the Year =

Mexican television award

- Awarded for: Best telenovela of the previous year
- First award: 1983; El derecho de nacer by Ernesto Alonso
- Currently held by: 2020; La usurpadora by Carmen Armendáriz

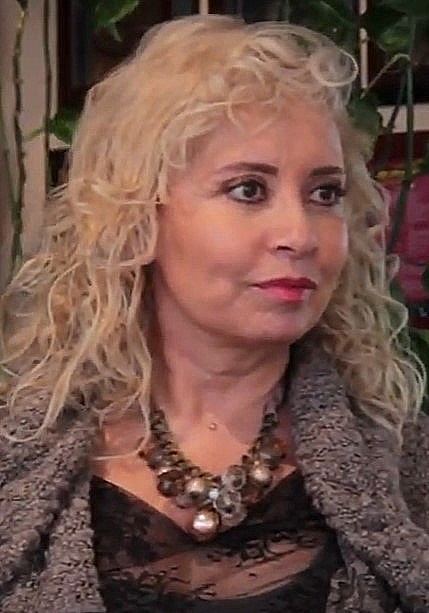
Carla Estrada won eight from fourteen nominations.

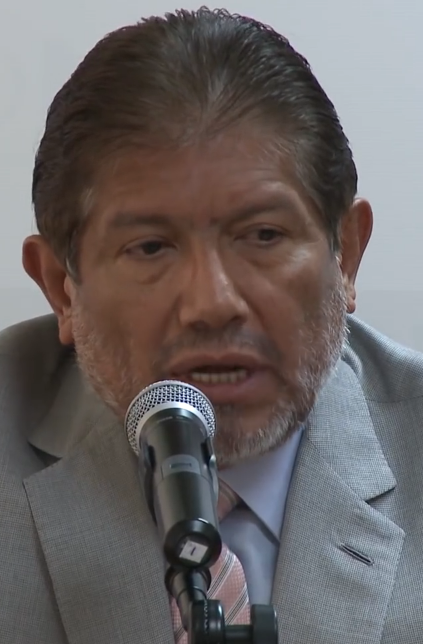
Juan Osorio won twice from eight nominations.

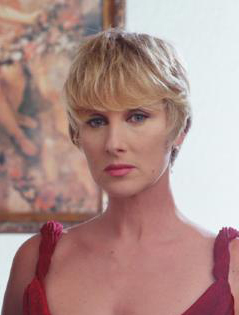
Christian Bach won once time (with Humberto Zurita).

Indicates the winner

Year	Producer	Telenovela	Ref
1983 (1st)	Ernesto Alonso	El derecho de nacer	
1983 (1st)	Patricia Lozano	Gabriel y Gabriela	
1983 (1st)	Silvia Pinal	Mañana es primavera	
1984 (2nd)	Ernesto Alonso	Bodas de odio	
1984 (2nd)	Irene Sabido	El amor ajeno	
1984 (2nd)	Ernesto Alonso	El maleficio	
1985 (3rd)	Ernesto Alonso	La traición	
1985 (3rd)	Valentín Pimstein	Amalia Batista	
1985 (3rd)	Carlos Téllez	La pasión de Isabela	
1986 (4th)	Ernesto Alonso	De pura sangre	
1986 (4th)	Ernesto Alonso	Angélica	
1986 (4th)	Eugenio Cobo	Esperándote	
1986 (4th)	Ernesto Alonso	Tú o nadie	
1986 (4th)	Valentín Pimstein	Vivir un poco	
1987 (5th)	Carlos Téllez	Cuna de lobos	
1987 (5th)	Emilio Larrosa	El camino secreto	
1987 (5th)	Ernesto Alonso	Herencia maldita	
1987 (5th)	Gonzalo Martínez Ortega	La gloria y el infierno	
1987 (5th)	Valentín Pimstein	Monte calvario	
1988 (6th)	Carla Estrada	Quinceañera	
1988 (6th)	Ernesto Alonso	Senda de gloria	
1988 (6th)	Ernesto Alonso	Victoria	
1989 (7th)	Carla Estrada	Amor en silencio	
1989 (7th)	Carlos Téllez	El extraño retorno de Diana Salazar	
1989 (7th)	Lucy Orozco	El pecado de Oyuki	
1989 (7th)	Ernesto Alonso	Encadenados	
1989 (7th)	Carlos Sotomayor	Pasión y poder	
1990 (8th)	Juan Osorio	Mi segunda madre	
1990 (8th)	Lucy Orozco	Teresa	
1990 (8th)	Julissa	Dulce desafío	
1990 (8th)	Valentín Pimstein	Simplemente María	
1991 (9th)	Luis de Llano Macedo	Alcanzar una estrella	
1991 (9th)	Carla Estrada	Cuando llega el amor	
1991 (9th)	Juan Osorio	Días sin luna	
1991 (9th)	Verónica Castro	Mi pequeña Soledad	
1991 (9th)	Ernesto Alonso	Yo compro esa mujer	
1992 (10th)	Carlos Sotomayor	Cadenas de amargura	
1992 (10th)	Carla Estrada	Amor de nadie	
1992 (10th)	Valentín Pimstein	La pícara Soñadora	
1992 (10th)	Emilio Larrosa	Muchachitas	
1993 (11th)	Carla Estrada	De frente al sol	
1993 (11th)	Luis de Llano Macedo	Baila conmigo	
1993 (11th)	Valentín Pimstein	María Mercedes	
1993 (11th)	Carlos Sotomayor	Valeria y Maximiliano	
1994 (12th)	José Rendón	Corazón salvaje	
1994 (12th)	Emilio Larrosa	Dos mujeres, un camino	
1994 (12th)	Carla Estrada	Los parientes pobres	
1995 (13th)	Carlos Sotomayor	Imperio de Cristal	
1995 (13th)	Luis de Llano Macedo	Agujetas de color de rosa	
1995 (13th)	Ernesto Alonso; Carlos Sotomayor	El vuelo del águila	
1996 (14th)	Carla Estrada	Lazos de amor	
1996 (14th)	Florinda Meza	La Dueña	
1996 (14th)	Lucy Orozco	Retrato de familia	
1997 (15th)	Christian Bach; Humberto Zurita	Cañaveral de pasiones	
1997 (15th)	Ernesto Alonso; Carlos Sotomayor	La antorcha encendida	
1997 (15th)	José Alberto Castro	Sentimientos ajenos	
1998 (16th)	Salvador Mejía Alejandre	Esmeralda	
1998 (16th)	Carla Estrada	María Isabel	
1998 (16th)	Carlos Payán; Epigmenio Ibarra	Mirada de mujer	
1999 (17th)	Carla Estrada	El privilegio de amar	
1999 (17th)	Carlos Sotomayor	La mentira	
1999 (17th)	Salvador Mejía Alejandre	La usurpadora	
2000 (18th)	Ernesto Alonso	Laberintos de pasión	
2000 (18th)	Emilio Larrosa	Mujeres engañadas	
2000 (18th)	Roberto Hernández Vázquez	Tres mujeres	
2001 (19th)	Salvador Mejía Alejandre	Abrázame muy fuerte	
2001 (19th)	Roberto Gómez Fernández	Locura de amor	
2001 (19th)	Pedro Damián	Primer amor... a mil por hora	
2002 (20th)	Carla Estrada	El Manantial	
2002 (20th)	Juan Osorio	Salomé	
2002 (20th)	José Alberto Castro	Sin pecado concebido	
2003 (21st)	Ernesto Alonso	La Otra	
2003 (21st)	Pedro Damián	Clase 406	
2003 (21st)	Angelli Nesma Medina	Niña amada mía	
2004 (22nd)	Carla Estrada	Amor Real	
2004 (22nd)	Ernesto Alonso	Amarte es mi pecado	
2004 (22nd)	Salvador Mejía Alejandre	Mariana de la noche	
2005 (23rd)	José Alberto Castro	Rubí	
2005 (23rd)	Angelli Nesma Medina	Apuesta por un amor	
2005 (23rd)	Rosy Ocampo	Misión S.O.S	
2006 (24th)	Carla Estrada	Alborada	
2006 (24th)	Salvador Mejía Alejandre	La esposa virgen	
2006 (24th)	Salvador Mejía Alejandre	La madrastra	
2006 (24th)	Pedro Damián	Rebelde	
2007 (25th)	Rosy Ocampo	La Fea Más Bella	
2007 (25th)	Roberto Hernández Vázquez	Heridas de Amor	
2007 (25th)	Emilio Larrosa	La Verdad Oculta	
2007 (25th)	Lucero Suárez	Las dos caras de Ana	
2007 (25th)	Salvador Mejía Alejandre	Mundo de Fieras	
2008 (26th)	Nicandro Díaz González	Destilando amor	
2008 (26th)	Carla Estrada	Pasión	
2008 (26th)	Mapat L. de Zatarain	Yo amo a Juan Querendón	
2009 (27th)	Salvador Mejía Alejandre	Fuego en la sangre	
2009 (27th)	Angelli Nesma Medina	Al diablo con los guapos	
2009 (27th)	Giselle González; Roberto Gómez Fernández	Alma de hierro	
2009 (27th)	Nathalie Lartilleux	Cuidado con el Ángel	
2009 (27th)	Lucero Suárez	Querida enemiga	
2010 (28th)	Emilio Larrosa	Hasta que el dinero nos separe	
2010 (28th)	Salvador Mejía Alejandre	Corazón salvaje	
2010 (28th)	Nicandro Díaz González	Mañana es para siempre	
2010 (28th)	Juan Osorio	Mi pecado	
2010 (28th)	Carla Estrada	Sortilegio	
2011 (29th)	Giselle González; Roberto Gómez Fernández	Para volver a amar	
2011 (29th)	José Alberto Castro	Teresa	
2011 (29th)	Carlos Moreno Laguillo	Cuando me enamoro	
2011 (29th)	Nicandro Díaz González	Soy tu dueña	
2011 (29th)	Angelli Nesma Medina	Llena de amor	
2012 (30th)	Rosy Ocampo	La fuerza del destino	
2012 (30th)	Emilio Larrosa	Dos hogares	
2012 (30th)	Juan Osorio	Una familia con suerte	
2012 (30th)	José Alberto Castro	La que no podía amar	
2012 (30th)	Salvador Mejía Alejandre	Triunfo del amor	
2013 (31st)	Rosy Ocampo	Por ella soy Eva	
2013 (31st)	Angelli Nesma Medina	Abismo de pasión	
2013 (31st)	José Alberto Castro	Corona de lágrimas	
2013 (31st)	Carlos Moreno Laguillo	Amor bravío	
2014 (32nd)	Nicandro Díaz González	Amores verdaderos	
2014 (32nd)	Nathalie Lartilleux	Corazón indomable	
2014 (32nd)	Lucero Suárez	De que te quiero, te quiero	
2014 (32nd)	Rosy Ocampo	Mentir para Vivir	
2014 (32nd)	Juan Osorio	Porque el amor manda	
2015 (33rd)	Juan Osorio	Mi corazón es tuyo	
2015 (33rd)	Giselle González	Yo no creo en los hombres	
2015 (33rd)	Angelli Nesma Medina	Lo que la vida me robó	
2015 (33rd)	Rosy Ocampo	Qué pobres tan ricos	
2015 (33rd)	Roberto Gómez Fernández	El color de la pasión	
2016 (34th)	José Alberto Castro	Pasión y poder	
2016 (34th)	Carlos Moreno	A que no me dejas	
2016 (34th)	Rosy Ocampo	Antes muerta que Lichita	
2016 (34th)	MaPat López de Zatarain	La sombra del pasado	
2016 (34th)	Lucero Suárez	La vecina	
2016 (34th)	Pedro Damián	Muchacha italiana viene a casarse	
2017 (35th)	Giselle González	La candidata	
2017 (35th)	MaPat López de Zatarain	Corazón que miente	
2017 (35th)	Roberto Gómez Fernández	El hotel de los secretos	
2017 (35th)	Silvia Cano	Sin rastro de ti	
2017 (35th)	Nathalie Lartilleux	Un camino hacia el destino	
2017 (35th)	José Alberto Castro	Vino el amor	
2018 (36th)	Giselle González	Caer en tentación	
2018 (36th)	Nicandro Díaz González	El Bienamado	
2018 (36th)	Lucero Suárez	Enamorándome de Ramón	
2018 (36th)	Angelli Nesma Medina	Me declaro culpable	
2018 (36th)	Juan Osorio	Mi marido tiene familia	
2018 (36th)	Eduardo Meza	Papá a toda madre	
2019 (37th)	Carlos Bardasano	Amar a muerte	
2019 (37th)	Carlos Bardasano	La Piloto	
2019 (37th)	Pedro Damián	Like	
2019 (37th)	Juan Osorio	Mi marido tiene más familia	
2019 (37th)	José Alberto Castro	Por amar sin ley	
2020 (38th)	Carmen Armendáriz	La usurpadora	
2020 (38th)	José Alberto Castro	Médicos, línea de vida	
2020 (38th)	José Alberto Castro	Por amar sin ley	
2020 (38th)	Lucero Suárez	Ringo	
2020 (38th)	Juan Osorio	Soltero con hijas	
2020 (38th)	Rosy Ocampo	Vencer el miedo	

== Records ==
- Producer with most awards: Carla Estrada with 8 awards.
- Producer with most nominations: Ernesto Alonso with 18 nominations.
- Producer with the most nominations (never winner): Angelli Nesma with 8 nominations.
- Producer who has won awards for two consecutive years: Ernesto Alonso, Carla Estrada, Rosy Ocampo and Giselle González.
- Producer win after long time: Juan Osorio by Mi segunda madre (1990) and Mi corazón es tuyo (2015), 25 years difference.
- Youngest winner producers: Carla Estrada and Juan Osorio, 30 years old.
- Oldest winner producer: Ernesto Alonso, 86 years old.
- Youngest nominated producer: Carlos Sotomayor, 33 years old.
- Oldest nominated producer: Ernesto Alonso, 87 years old.
- Telenovela with most awards: Amar a muerte with 14 awards.
- Telenovela with most nominations: Mi marido tiene más familia with 21 nominations.
- Telenovela with the most nominations (without winning a single category): El color de la pasión and Sin rastro de ti with 13 nominations.
- Producers and telenovelas winning with the same story: Ernesto Alonso (Bodas de odio, 1983) and Carla Estrada (Amor Real, 2003).
