= Locura de amor (TV series) =

- Genre: Telenovela; Romance; Drama
- Based on: Dulce desafío by Jorge Patiño
- Directed by: Alejandro Gamboa; Adriana Barraza
- Starring: Juan Soler; Adriana Nieto; Irán Castillo; Laisha Wilkins; Juan Peláez
- Opening theme: Enloquéceme by OV7
- Country of origin: Mexico
- Original language: Spanish
- No. of episodes: 115

Production
- Executive producer: Roberto Gómez Fernández
- Producer: Giselle González
- Production locations: Filming; Televisa San Ángel; Mexico City, Mexico
- Camera setup: Multi-camera
- Running time: 41-44 minutes
- Production company: Televisa

Original release
- Network: Canal de las Estrellas
- Release: May 1 – October 6, 2000

Locura de amor (English: Craziness of Love) is a Mexican telenovela produced by Roberto Gómez Fernández for Televisa that premiered on May 1, 2000 and ended on October 6, 2000. The series is a remake of the 1988 telenovela Dulce desafío. It stars Juan Soler and Adriana Nieto (later replaced by Irán Castillo), Laisha Wilkins, Juan Peláez and Gabriela Platas.

== Cast ==
- Adriana Nieto as Natalia Sandoval #1
- Irán Castillo as Natalia Sandoval #2
- Juan Soler as Dr. Enrique Gallardo
- Laisha Wilkins as Rebeca Becerril
- Juan Peláez as Santiago Sandoval
- Adamari López as Carmen Ruelas
- Beatriz Aguirre as Doña Esther Vda. de Sandoval
- Rosa María Bianchi as Clemencia Castañón
- Osvaldo Benavides as León Palacios
- Alejandra Barros as Beatriz Sandoval
- Mané Macedo as Ruth Quintana
- Raúl Araiza as Iván Quintana
- Gabriela Platas as Gisela Castillo
- Francesca Guillén as Lucinda Balboa
- Mariana Ávila as Dafne Hurtado
- Ana Liz Rivera as Mirtha Gómez
- Ulises de la Torre as Felipe Zárate
- Renato Bartilotti as Mauro Rodari
- Alejandro de la Madrid as Paco Ruelas
- Audrey Vera as Citalli de la Fuente
- Pía Aun as Brenda Tovar
- Omar García Peña as Juanjo Olvera y Monfort
- Yula Pozo as Doris Quintana
- Mario Prudom as Alejo Quiroz Castañón
- Josefina Echánove as Hortensia Valderrama
- Amparo Arozamena as Doña Tomasa
- Rafael Amador as Rosalío Gómez
- Olivia Bucio as Irene Ruelas
- Ricardo de Pascual as Manolo Palacios
- Eduardo Liñán as Sergio Balboa
- Luis Couturier as Hugo Castillo
- Patricia Martínez as Belén Gómez
- Alejandra Peniche as Vilma Lara
- Pedro Weber "Chatanuga" as Faustino Cisneros
- Julio Vega as Don Gaspar
- Aurora Alonso as Herminia López
- Ángeles Balvanera as Tita Juan
- Juan Carlos Casasola as Damián
- Mauricio Castillo as Salustio Marín
- Carlos Curiel as Israel Ana
- María de la Torre as Gabriela Cuevas
- María de Souza as Vera Montes
- Jacqueline García as Priscila Beltrán
- Amparo Garrido as Chabela
- Juan Antonio Gómez as Blas
- Anabel Gutiérrez as Corina
- Enrique Hidalgo as Father Javier
- Mayra Loyo as Rosalía
- Bibelot Mansur as Rubí
- Sergio Márquez as Don Neto
- Consuelo Mendiola as Shandira
- Beatriz Monroy as Macrina
- Raquel Morell as Paulina Hurtado
- Rosa María Moreno as Magnolia
- Claudia Ortega as Venus
- Alex Peniche as Chema
- Natalia Traven as Ana
- Lupe Vázquez as Justina Suárez
- Tere Vázquez as Goya
- Juan Carlos Colombo as Alonso Ruelas
- Georgina Becerril as Elisa Becerril
- Anadela as Mariana
- Andrea Soberón as Natalia Sandoval (child)
- Fátima Torre as Beatriz Sandoval (child)
- Carlos Torres Torrija as Israel
- Pepe Olivares as Carlos Vega
- Norma Reyna Brito as Eusebia Torres
- Adalberto Parra as Fabrizio
- Jordi Rosado as Conductor Intercolegial
- Mónica Riestra as Ángeles
- Adriana Barraza as Soledad Retana
- Dulce María as Ximena
- Manola Diez as Melissa Corcuera
- Luz María Zetina as Lorena
- Dominika Paleta as Pamela
- Héctor Suárez Gomís as Aviation Pilot
- Karla Cossío as Woman in Love with León
- Alejandro Ibarra as Gerardo
- Anahí as Giovanna Luna Guerra
- Alberto Estrella
- Carlos Pérez
- Gustavo Rojo
- Raúl Araiza

== Awards and nominations ==
Year	Award	Category	Nominee	Result
2001	19th TVyNovelas Awards	Best Telenovela	Roberto Gómez Fernández	Nominated
2001	19th TVyNovelas Awards	Best Musical Theme	"Enloquéceme" by OV7	Won

== See also ==
- List of telenovelas
