= Giselle González =

Giselle González may refer to:

- Giselle González (beauty pageant titleholder), Panamanian beauty pageant contestant, winner of the Señorita Panamá 1992 title
- Giselle González (producer), Mexican telenovelas producer
