= TVyNovelas Award for Best Co-lead Actress =

Mexican television award

- Awarded for: Best performance by an actress in a co-leading role
- First award: 1991; Mariana Levy †; Yo compro esa mujer
- Currently held by: 2020; Jade Fraser; Vencer el miedo

== Winners and nominees ==
=== 1980s ===
- 1986: Nuria Bages for Vivir un poco
- 1987: Carmen Montejo for Cuna de lobos

=== 1990s ===
Winner	Nominated
9th TVyNovelas Awards
Mariana Levy for Yo compro esa mujer	Ana Silvia Garza for Alcanzar una estrella; Andrea Legarreta for Alcanzar una estrella; Marcela Páez for Alcanzar una estrella; María Rojo for Cuando llega el amor
10th TVyNovelas Awards
Laura León for Muchachitas	Delia Casanova for Cadenas de amargura; Tina Romero for Cadenas de amargura
~~1993 to 1999~~

=== 2000s ===
Winner	Nominated
~~2000 and 2001~~
20th TVyNovelas Awards
Patricia Navidad for El Manantial	María Sorté for Sin pecado concebido; Marlene Favela for La intrusa
~~2003 to 2007~~
26th TVyNovelas Awards
Marisol del Olmo for Pasión	Martha Julia for Destilando Amor; Silvia Pasquel for Yo amo a Juan Querendón
27th TVyNovelas Awards
Patricia Reyes Spíndola for Fuego en la sangre	Alejandra Barros for Alma de hierro; Frances Ondiviela for Tormenta en el paraíso

=== 2010s ===
Winner	Nominated
28th TVyNovelas Awards
Violeta Isfel for Atrévete a soñar	Claudia Troyo for Hasta que el dinero nos separe; Laura Flores for Corazón salvaje
29th TVyNovelas Awards
Alejandra Barros for Para volver a amar	Ana Brenda Contreras for Teresa; Patricia Navidad for Zacatillo, un lugar en tu corazón
30th TVyNovelas Awards
Marisol del Olmo for Esperanza del Corazón	Alicia Machado for Una familia con suerte; Ximena Herrera for Ni contigo ni sin ti
31st TVyNovelas Awards
Patricia Navidad for Por Ella Soy Eva	África Zavala for Corona de lágrimas; Eugenia Cauduro for Abismo de pasión
32nd TVyNovelas Awards
Cynthia Klitbo for De que te quiero, te quiero	Cecilia Gabriela for Mentir para vivir; Kika Edgar for Porque el amor manda; Natalia Esperón for Amores verdaderos
33rd TVyNovelas Awards
Fabiola Guajardo for Yo no creo en los hombres	África Zavala for La malquerida; Eugenia Cauduro for El color de la pasión; Silvia Pasquel for Qué pobres tan ricos
34th TVyNovelas Awards
Susana González for La sombra del pasado	Cecilia Gabriela for A que no me dejas; Alejandra García for Amor de barrio; Chantal Andere for Antes muerta que Lichita; Claudia Ramírez for Lo imperdonable
35th TVyNovelas Awards
Susana González for La candidata	Leticia Huijara for Despertar contigo; Ilse Salas for El hotel de los secretos; Grettell Valdéz for Las amazonas; Eugenia Cauduro for Un camino hacia el destino
36th TVyNovelas Awards
Diana Bracho for Mi marido tiene familia	Marisol del Olmo for Enamorándome de Ramón; Erika Buenfil for La doble vida de Estela Carrillo; Verónica Jaspeado for Papá a toda madre; Claudia Ramírez for Sin tu mirada
37th TVyNovelas Awards
Macarena Achaga for Amar a muerte	Geraldine Galván for Hijas de la luna; Gabriela Platas for Mi marido tiene familia; Laura Vignatti for Mi marido tiene familia; Altair Jarabo for Por amar sin ley

=== 2020s ===
Winner	Nominated
38th TVyNovelas Awards
Jade Fraser for Vencer el miedo	Ana Bertha Espín for La usurpadora; Grettell Valdez for Médicos; Luz Ramos for Ringo; Paulette Hernández for Cuna de lobos

== Records ==
- Most awarded actress: Patricia Navidad, Marisol del Olmo and Susana González 2 times.
- Most nominated actress: Patricia Navidad and Eugenia Cauduro with 3 nominations.
- Most nominated actress without a win: Eugenia Cauduro with 3 nominations.
- Youngest winners: Mariana Levy and Violeta Isfel, 24 years old.
- Youngest nominee: Andrea Legarreta, 20 years old.
- Oldest winner: Diana Bracho, 73 years old.
- Oldest nominee: Diana Bracho, 73 years old.
- Actress winning after short time: Susana González by (La sombra del pasado, 2016) and (La candidata, 2017), 2 consecutive years.
- Actress winning after long time: Patricia Navidad by (El Manantial, 2002) and (Por Ella Soy Eva, 2013), 11 years difference.
- Actresses winning this category, despite having been as a main villain:
  - Violeta Isfel (Atrévete a soñar, 2010)
  - Susana González (La candidata, 2017)
- Actress was nominated in this category, despite having played as a main villain:
  - Andrea Legarreta (Alcanzar una estrella, 1991)
  - Martha Julia (Destilando Amor, 2008)
  - Chantal Andere (Antes muerta que Lichita, 2016)
  - Ilse Salas (El hotel de los secretos, 2017)
- Foreign winning actresses:
  - Macarena Achaga from Argentina
