= Ojos que no ven =

- Theatrical release poster
- Directed by: Alfonso Zarate
- Written by: Alfonso Zarate; Sandra A. Flores Urrea
- Produced by: Viana González Delgado; Hugo Lara Chavez; Inna Payán; Édgar A. Romero; Luis Salinas
- Starring: Arcelia Ramírez; Fernanda Castillo
- Cinematography: Santiago Sanchez
- Edited by: Óscar Figueroa
- Music by: Tomás Barreiro
- Production companies: Animal de Luz Films; MVM Motor Visual Media S.A
- Distributed by: Videocine
- Release dates: November 17, 2022 (Mexico); January 4, 2023 (Vix+)
- Running time: 90 minutes
- Country: Mexico
- Language: Spanish
- Box office: $376,871

Ojos que no ven (lit. 'Out of Seeing Eyes') is a 2022 Mexican psychological thriller film directed by Alfonso Zarate (in his directorial debut) and written by Zarate & Sandra A. Flores Urrea. Starring Arcelia Ramírez, Fernanda Castillo and Flavio Medina.

== Synopsis ==
Elena, a private school librarian, becomes fixated on a new boy at the school and treats him like the son she lost. Her obsession escalates until she takes him away, triggering a desperate struggle by his real mother, Andrea, to get her child back.

== Cast ==
The actors participating in this film are:

- Arcelia Ramírez as Elena
- Fernanda Castillo as Andrea
- Flavio Medina as Tomas
- Matías López as Matías
- Héctor Kotsifakis as Velasco
- Claudia Santiago as Director Susana
- Luciana González De León as Luciana
- Azucena Acevedo as Sofía
- Karla Garrido as Nurse
- César González as Don Pancho

== Release ==
It premiered on November 17, 2022, in Mexican theaters, then it premiered on January 4, 2023, on Vix+.

== Reception ==
=== Critical reception ===
Fernando Zamora from Milenio wrote: "Beyond influences and ascriptions to film currents, Ojos que no ven confirms that Mexican cinema continues to find its own voice. And it is something that thirty years ago seemed impossible."

=== Accolades ===
Year	Award	Category	Recipient	Result	Ref.
2023	Canacine Awards	Best Actress	Arcelia Ramírez	Nominated	
2023	Canacine Awards	Best Actor	Flavio Medina	Nominated	
2023	Diosas de Plata	Best First Work	Alfonso Zarate	Nominated	
