= Juan Carlos Colombo =

Argentine–Mexican actor

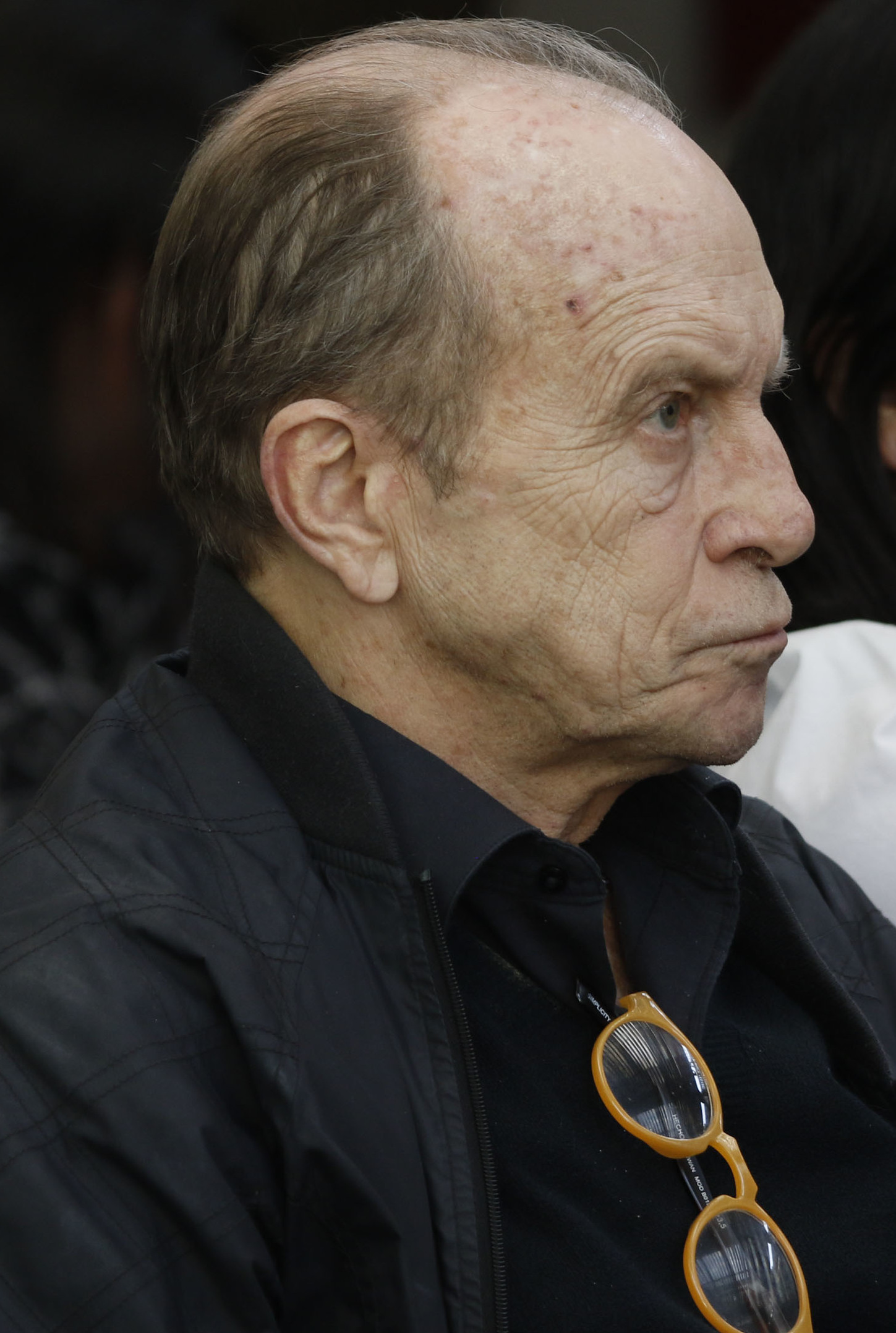
- Colombo in 2019
- Born: 7 November 1950 (age 75); San Juan, Argentina
- Occupation: Actor
- Years active: 1978–present
- Children: Felipe Colombo (son)

Juan Carlos Colombo (born 7 November 1950 in San Juan, Argentina) is an Argentine–Mexican actor. He has lived in Mexico since 1975, where he studied acting and met his wife, actress Patricia Eguía. Colombo is the father of the Argentine-Mexican actor and musician Felipe Colombo. In 2017, the National Association of Actors awarded him the "Virginia Fábregas" medal for his 25-year artistic career in Mexico. Colombo is mostly known for his television roles, particularly in Televisa's telenovelas, among which are: Teresa (2010), Cachito de cielo (2012), and Yo no creo en los hombres (2014).

== Filmography ==
=== Selected film roles ===
Year	Title	Roles	Notes
1978	Damiana	Mario	
1992	Gertrudis	Father Miguel Hidalgo	
1992	Playback		Short film
1993	Fray Bartolomé de las Casas		
1993	Miroslava	Pascual Roncal	
1993	Cronos	Funeral Director	
1994	La reina de la noche	Araujo	
1995	Sin remitente	Editor-in-chief	
1995	Mystery of the Maya	Giles Healey	Documentary short
1996	Fuga	Ejecutivo	Short film
1998	El evangelio de las maravillas		
1999	Un dulce olor a muerte	La Amistad	
1999	La ley de Herodes	Ramírez	
2000	Sexo por compasión	Father Anselmo	
2000	Todo el poder	Licenciado Luna	
2006	Más que a nada en el mundo	Héctor	
2008	Cinco días sin Nora	Alberto Nurko	
2010	Somos lo que hay	Director de la Funeraria	
2010	Hidalgo: La historia jamás contada	Obispo	
2013	Tlatelolco, verano del 68	Abuelo Flavio	
2014	Perfect Obedience	Father Ángel de la Cruz	
2014	Cantinflas	José Pagola	
2014	Elvira, te daría mi vida pero la estoy usando	Don Ruti	
2015	Mexican dream	El abuelo	
2022	Incomplete Lovers	Juan Carlos	
2024	We Shall Not Be Moved	Dr. Candiani	
2024	Zafari	Francisco	

=== Television roles ===
Year	Title	Roles	Notes
1990	Hora marcada	Doctor	Episode: "Natiely"
1991	Vida robada	Ernesto	
1991	Cadenas de amargura	Armando Gastelum	
1992	Las secretas intenciones	José Manuel Curiel	
1994	El vuelo del águila	Melchor Ocampo	
1994	Mujer, casos de la vida real		Episode: "Quién lo iba a creer"
1995	Si Dios me quita la vida	Pablo García	
1995	Lazos de amor	Samuel Levy	
1996	La antorcha encendida	Fray Vicente de Santa María	
1998	Rencor apasionado	Otto	
1999	Cuentos para solitarios	Boss	Episode: "Infidelis"
1999	Amor gitano	Martín	
2000	Locura de amor	Alonso Ruelas	
2001–2002	El juego de la vida	Ignacio de la Mora	
2003	Clase 406	Jorge Riquelme	
2003	Clap, el lugar de tus sueños	Jorge	
2005	Pablo y Andrea	Sabás	
2006–2007	Amor mío	René Velasco	Series regular; 116 episodes
2008–2009	Alma de hierro	Rafael	
2008	Los simuladores	Luque	Episode: "Acosada"
2008	Mujeres asesinas	José Esquivel	Episode: "Emilia, cocinera"
2008	Sexo y otros secretos	Lazaro	2 episodes
2009	Hermanos y detectives	Palafox	Episode: "El caso Peralta"
2010	Locas de amor	Dr. Hevia	Series regular; 25 episodes
2010	Gritos de muerte y libertad	Juez Berazueta	Episode: "Retrato de una Leona"
2010–2011	Teresa	Armando	Series regular; 108 episodes
2011	El encanto del águila	José Yves Limantour	2 episodes
2012	Cachito de cielo	Ezequiel	Series regular; 48 episodes
2013	Porque el amor manda	Sr. Rivadeneira	Episode: "Gran final: Part 1"
2014	Como dice el dicho	Roberto Ramiro	Episode: "En la cama y en la cárcel" Episode: "Quién no vive para servir"
2014–2015	Yo no creo en los hombres	Fermín	Series regular; 89 episodes
2014–2016	Sr. Ávila	Perches	Recurring role (seasons 2–3); 5 episodes
2015	Yo no creo en los hombres, el origen	Fermín	Television film
2016	Yago	Jonás	Series regular; 53 episodes
2016–2017	La candidata	Morales	Recurring role; 11 episodes
2017	¡Ay Güey!	Licenciado Jáuregui	Recurring role (season 1); 6 episodes
2018	José José, el príncipe de la canción	Carlos Herrera Calles	Series regular; 28 episodes
2018	Diablo Guardián	Daniel Valinear	Episode: "Ser o no ser... yo"
2018	Falco	Elías Falco	Series regular; 5 episodes
2019	This Is Silvia Pinal	Director	3 episodes
2019	Sitiados: México	Inquisidor	Episode: "El destino"
2019	Dani Who?	Miguel	
2026	La Banda	Doc	

== Awards and nominations ==
Year	Award	Category	Works	Result
2017	1st Cartelera Awards	Best Actor	Después del ensayo	Nominated
