= Quiero amarte =

- Genre: Telenovela
- Created by: Martha Carrillo; Cristina García
- Based on: Imperio de cristal by Jaime García and Orlando Merino
- Written by: Martha Carrillo; Cristina García; Jaime García; Orlando Merino
- Directed by: Fernando Nesme; Luis Vélez
- Creative director: Jerry Funes
- Starring: Karyme Lozano; Cristián de la Fuente; Diana Bracho; Flavio Medina; Alejandra Barros; Adriana Louvier; José Elías Moreno
- Theme music composer: Armando Manzanero
- Opening theme: "Quiero amarte" performed by Armando Manzanero, Noel Schajris, Samo, Jesús Navarro, Juan Pablo Manzanero and Carlos Macías
- Country of origin: Mexico
- Original language: Spanish
- No. of episodes: 161

Production
- Executive producer: Carlos Moreno Laguillo
- Producer: Hilda Santaella Hernández
- Cinematography: Alfredo Sánchez; Alejandro Frutos
- Editors: Alfredo Sánchez Díaz; Mauricio Coronel
- Camera setup: Multi-camera

Original release
- Network: Canal de las Estrellas
- Release: October 21, 2013 – June 1, 2014

Quiero amarte (English title: Loving You Is All I Want) is a Mexican telenovela produced by Carlos Moreno Laguillo for Televisa that aired on Canal de las Estrellas from October 21, 2013 to June 1, 2014.

It is an adaptation of Imperio de cristal, produced by Carlos Sotomayor in 1994 and written by Jaime García and Orlando Merino, combined with an original story by Martha Carrillo and Cristina García, who are also the adapters of this new version.

The series stars Karyme Lozano, Cristián de la Fuente, Diana Bracho, Flavio Medina, Alejandra Barros, Adriana Louvier and José Elías Moreno.

Production of Quiero amarte officially started on August 20, 2013.

In the United States, the telenovela aired on Univision from September 22, 2014 to May 8, 2015.

== Plot ==
Mauro (Alex Sirvent) and Florencia (Karyme Lozano) are unable to be together thanks to the wickedness of Lucrecia (Elena de Tellitu), a woman obsessed with Mauro, who makes use of a pregnancy to trap him. Florencia decides to marry David (Abraham Ramos). As the years go by, Mauro and Florencia realize they are not happy and try to rekindle their love, but Lucrecia won't let that happen, so she gets rid of her rival, unleashing jealousy in David, who also dies.

Thirty years later, when Mauro (José Elías Moreno) has resigned himself to his coexistence with Lucrecia (Diana Bracho), a woman will arrive in their lives to remind them of the past; she is Amaya (Karyme Lozano), the living reincarnation of Florencia, who this time will capture the heart of their son, Maximiliano (Cristián de la Fuente). Amaya and Maximiliano will have to face many obstacles to discover if their love is stronger than the resentment, revenge and hatred that arose in their parents' past and that marked their destinies.

== Cast ==
=== Main ===
- Karyme Lozano as Amaya Serrano Martínez / Florencia Martínez
- Cristián de la Fuente as Maximiliano Montesinos Ugarte
- Diana Bracho as Lucrecia Ugarte de Montesinos
- Flavio Medina as César Montesinos Ugarte
- Alejandra Barros as Juliana Montesinos Carmona
- Adriana Louvier as Constanza Olazábal
- José Elías Moreno as Don Mauro Montesinos

=== Also main ===
- Otto Sirgo as Don Manuel Olazábal
- Olivia Bucio as Dolores Morales de Valdez
- Salvador Zerboni as Horacio Espinoza
- Andrés Mercado as Iván Fonseca
- Renata Notni as Mariana Valdez Morales
- Luz María Jerez as Eloísa Ugarte
- Salvador Sánchez as Cipriano Valdez
- Alex Sirvent as Young Mauro
- Héctor Sáez as Héctor Fonseca
- Diego Amozurrutia as Ulises Arteaga
- Cassandra Sánchez Navarro as Flavia Montesinos Ugarte
- Hernán Canto as Lucio Montesinos Ugarte
- Yolanda Ventura as Genoveva
- Ricardo Franco as Salvador Romero
- Tanya Vázquez as Carolina Rivera
- Patricia Martínez as Chelo
- Jean Paul Leroux as Jorge de la Parra

=== Recurring and guest stars ===
- Gabriela Goldsmith as Emma
- Abraham Ramos as David
- Alejandro Tommasi as Omar
- Vanesa Restrepo as Nora
- Thelma Dorantes as Amparo
- Javier Herranz as Father Hipólito
- Briggite Bozzo as Valeria
- Diego Lune as Alan
- Elena de Tellitu as Young Lucrecia
- Cristiane Aguinaga as Laura
- Abril Onyl as Hortensia
- Sebastián Llapur as Franco
- Jonathan Kuri as Aarón
- Zadkiel Molina as Heriberto
- Roberto Ruy as Efraín
- Xorge Noble as Baldomero
- Pilar Escalante as Vera

== Awards and nominations ==
Year	Association	Category	Nominee(s)	Result
2013	TV Adicto Golden Awards	Best Song	Quiero amarte	Won
2014	Kids Choice Awards México	Favorite Villain	Diego Amozurrutia	Nominated
2015	TVyNovelas Awards	Best Leading Actor	José Elías Moreno	Nominated
2015	TVyNovelas Awards	Best Supporting Actor	Salvador Sánchez	Nominated
2015	TVyNovelas Awards	Best Musical Theme	"Quiero amarte" by Armando Manzanero, Noel Schajris, Samo, Jesús Navarro, Juan Pablo Manzanero and Carlos Macías	Nominated
