= Sophie Alexander =

Mexican actress

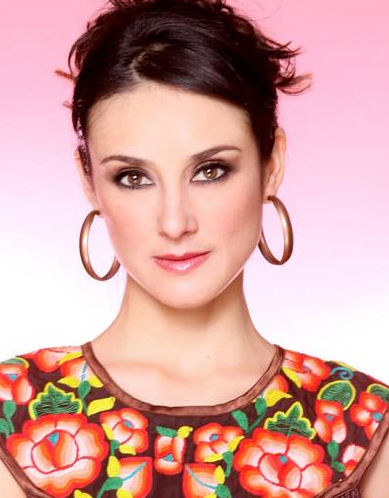
- Alexander in 2019
- Born: Sophie Alexander Katz; 20 May 1978 (age 46); Mexico City, Mexico
- Occupation: Actress
- Years active: 2005–present
- Relatives: Susana Alexander (aunt)

Sophie Alexander (born Sophie Alexander Katz on May 20, 1978, in Mexico City, Mexico) is a Mexican actress.

== Filmography ==
Telenovelas, Series, Films
Year	Title	Role	Notes
2005	Tres	Karina	Film
2005	La noche de siempre	Alicia	Film
2005-06	Amor en custodia	Noelia	Supporting role
2006	1975		Film
2006-07	Montecristo	Mariana	Supporting role
2007	Luces artificiales		Film
2007	Cañitas, presencia	Clienta	Film
2007	El guapo		Film
2007	Todos los días son tuyos	Friend	Film
2007	Puppet soldiers	Sophie	Film
2007	Hitgirl	Violeta Valdivia	Film
2007	One long night	Azafata	Film
2008	Café Paraíso	Susan	Film
2008	Tengo todo excepto a ti	Susana	Special appearance
2009	El sótano	Sophie	Film
2009-12	XY, La Revista	Paulina Ketz	TV series
2010	180º	Magaly	Film
2010	Si maneja de noche procure ir acompañado	María	Film
2010	De este mundo		Film
2010	Mujeres Asesinas 3	Regina	Episode: "Thelma, impaciente"
2010-11	Para Volver a Amar	Maité Duarte de Casso	Co-Protagonist
2011	Labios Rojos	Lorena	Film
2013	Casate conmigo...mi amor	Bárbara	TV series
2014–2015	Yo no creo en los hombres	Maleny Santibáñez de la Vega	Antagonist
2016	Yago	Kathia	Co-Protagonist

=== Theater ===
- Rock n' Roll
- Mujeres soñaron caballos
- Satélite 2012
- La modestia
- Parking Place del deseo
- Festen
- El oeste solitario
- Cuentos de Navidad
- De-madres
- Las mujeres sabias
- La gaviota
- Tres hermanas
- Hamlet
- El Filosofo Declara
- Homero, Iliada

== Awards and nominations ==
Year	Award	Category	Telenovela	Result
2001	TVyNovelas Awards	Best Co-star Actress	Para Volver a Amar	Nominated
2001	Festival de TV Internacional Monte Carlo	Best Actress in Drama	XY, La Revista	Nominated
2019	Ariel Awards	Best Actress	Los Días Más Oscuros de Nosotras	Pending
