= Para volver a amar (TV series) =

- Also known as: Marriage Diaries
- Genre: Telenovela
- Created by: Adriana Suárez; Pedro Miguel Rozo
- Written by: Aída Guajardo
- Directed by: Eric Morales; Francisco Franco
- Starring: Rebecca Jones; Alejandro Camacho; René Strickler; Alejandra Barros; Jesús Ochoa; Nailea Norvind; África Zavala; Mark Tacher
- Opening theme: "Para volver a amar" performed by Kany García
- Country of origin: Mexico
- Original language: Spanish
- No. of episodes: 146

Production
- Executive producers: Giselle González; Roberto Gómez Fernández
- Cinematography: Manuel Barajas; Luis Rodríguez
- Editors: Juan Franco; Luis Horacio Valdés
- Running time: 40-45 minutes

Original release
- Network: Canal de las Estrellas
- Release: 12 July 2010 – 30 January 2011

Related
- El último matrimonio feliz (2008)

Marriage Diaries (Spanish: Para volver a amar, lit. 'To love again') is a Mexican telenovela produced by Giselle González and Roberto Gómez Fernández for Televisa. It is a remake of the Colombian telenovela El último matrimonio feliz.

It premiered on Canal de las Estrellas on 12 July 2010. The series was originally scheduled to be broadcast at 22:00, but moved to 17:00, to add a few more minutes to the episodes of Soy tu dueña. The final episode aired on 30 January 2011.

It stars Rebecca Jones, Alejandro Camacho, René Strickler, Alejandra Barros, Jesús Ochoa, Nailea Norvind, África Zavala and Mark Tacher.

Marriage Diaries aired in the United States on Univision from 8 March 2011 to 28 October 2011.

== Synopsis ==
Six women who don't live the life they want and keep quiet about what's happening to them.

Antonia (Rebecca Jones), a successful real estate agent, discovers she has breast cancer and decides to hide it from her husband, Patricio (René Strickler), triggering a crisis that jeopardizes her marriage.

Valeria (Nailea Norvind) is an upper-class lady who seemingly has a perfect life, but in the privacy of her luxurious mansion, she endures all kinds of humiliation from her spouse, Braulio (Alejandro Camacho).

Bárbara (Alejandra Barros) is cheerful and lively; no one imagines she's experiencing a living hell with her violent and alcoholic companion, Jaime (Juan Carlos Barreto).

At age 50, Rosaura (Zaide Silvia Gutiérrez) faces a turning point when her partner, Rolando (Jesús Ochoa), leaves her for a younger woman.

Maite (Sophie Alexander) is an ambitious professional who competes against her mate, Jorge (Mark Tacher), for job positions and money.

Yorley (África Zavala) is an unassuming and determined young mother married to David (Flavio Medina), an immature and lazy man who doesn't let her grow.

These six women will meet and together will learn to break the bonds that prevent them from being happy.

== Cast ==
=== Main ===
- Rebecca Jones as Antonia Palacios
- Alejandro Camacho as Braulio Longoria
- René Strickler as Patricio González
- Alejandra Barros as Bárbara Mantilla
- Jesús Ochoa as Rolando Salgar
- Nailea Norvind as Valeria Andrade
- África Zavala as Yorley Quiroga
- Mark Tacher as Jorge Casso

=== Also main ===
- Zaide Silvia Gutiérrez as Rosaura Pereyra
- Flavio Medina as David Magaña
- Juan Carlos Barreto as Jaime Espinosa
- Sophie Alexander as Maite Duarte
- Agustín Arana as Leonardo Torres

=== Recurring ===
- Eduardo España as Quintín
- Pablo Valentín as Marcial
- Isabel Benet as Elvia
- Danny Perea as Jenny
- Alex Sirvent as Alcides
- Marcia Coutiño as Charito
- Gabriela Zamora as Mireya
- Jana Raluy as Miranda
- Alfonso Dosal as Sebastián
- Juan Ríos as Faber
- Loania Quinzaños as Fanny
- Claudia Godínez as Jessica
- Thelma Madrigal as Paola
- Guillermo Avilán as César
- Magda Guzmán as Conchita
- Édgar Vivar as Renato

=== Guest stars ===
- Arturo Barba as Román
- Jonathan Becerra as Beto
- Socorro Bonilla as Ofelia
- Adrián Carreón as Roque
- Cassandra Ciangherotti as Laila
- Dobrina Cristeva as Greta
- Derik Dean as Adri
- David del Real as Voiceover during conference
- Benny Emmanuel as El Darwin
- Alberto Estrella as Rodrigo
- José Carlos Farrera as Ariel
- Ricardo Fastlitcht as Plinio
- Susana González as Doménica
- Blanca Guerra as Master of ceremonies
- Ricardo Guerra as Pavel
- Harding Junior as Photographer
- Lisset as Denisse
- Mario Loria as Sergio
- Leonardo Mackey as Humberto
- Cristian Gerardo Martínez as Dealer
- Justo Martínez as Nazario
- Victoria Mejía as Gina
- Jacqueline Molina as Hostess
- Mila Nader as Young wife
- Maricruz Nájera as Confesión
- Rodolfo Nevarez as Doctor
- Emmanuel Orenday as Dylan
- Raquel Pankowsky as Mrs. Pimentel
- Adalberto Parra as Amador
- Alondra Pavón as Apartment saleswoman
- Georgina Pedret as Clarita
- Ariane Pellicer as Cindy
- Alex Perea as El Zorro
- Miguel Pizarro as Andrés
- Clarisa Rendón as Doctor
- María Sandoval as Woman
- Karol Sevilla as Monse
- Carlos Speitzer as Gangster
- Olinka Velázquez as Clemen
- Juan Verduzco as Pimentel
- Javier Villarreal as Box-office

== Awards and nominations ==
Year	Award	Category	Nominee(s)	Result	Ref.
2010	TV Adicto Golden Awards				
2010	TV Adicto Golden Awards	Best Set Design and Props	Para volver a amar	Won	
2010	TV Adicto Golden Awards	Best Costumes	Para volver a amar	Won	
2010	TV Adicto Golden Awards	Best Return	Rebecca Jones	Won	
2010	TV Adicto Golden Awards	Best Leading Actor	Jesús Ochoa	Won	
2010	TV Adicto Golden Awards	Best Leading Actress	Magda Guzmán	Won	
2010	TV Adicto Golden Awards	Best Screenplay	Para volver a amar	Won	
2010	TV Adicto Golden Awards	Best Character Design	Para volver a amar	Won	
2010	TV Adicto Golden Awards	Best Cast	Para volver a amar	Won	
2010	TV Adicto Golden Awards	Best Direction	Para volver a amar	Won	
2010	TV Adicto Golden Awards	Best Production	Para volver a amar	Won	
2010	TV Adicto Golden Awards	Best Telenovela by Televisa	Para volver a amar	Won	
2011	TVyNovelas Awards				
2011	TVyNovelas Awards	Best Telenovela	Giselle González; Roberto Gómez Fernández	Won	
2011	TVyNovelas Awards	Best Actress	Rebecca Jones	Nominated	
2011	TVyNovelas Awards	Best Actor	René Strickler	Nominated	
2011	TVyNovelas Awards	Best Antagonist Actor	Juan Carlos Barreto	Won	
2011	TVyNovelas Awards	Best Leading Actress	Magda Guzmán	Won	
2011	TVyNovelas Awards	Best Leading Actor	Alejandro Camacho	Won	
2011	TVyNovelas Awards	Best Co-lead Actress	Alejandra Barros	Won	
2011	TVyNovelas Awards	Best Co-lead Actor	Jesús Ochoa	Won	
2011	TVyNovelas Awards	Best Young Lead Actor	Alfonso Dosal	Won	
2011	TVyNovelas Awards	Best Female Revelation	Thelma Madrigal	Nominated	
2011	TVyNovelas Awards	Best Musical Theme	"Para volver a amar" by Kany García	Nominated	
2011	Bravo Awards	Best Telenovela	Giselle González; Roberto Gómez Fernández	Won	
2011	Bravo Awards	Best Antagonist Actor	Juan Carlos Barreto	Won	
2011	Bravo Awards	Best Male Revelation	Alfonso Dosal	Won	
2011	Bravo Awards	Best Child Performance	Loania Quinzaños	Won	
2011	Bravo Awards	Best Screenplay	Aída Guajardo	Won	
2011	People en Español Awards	Best Telenovela	Para volver a amar	Nominated	
2011	People en Español Awards	Best Actress	Nailea Norvind	Nominated	
2011	People en Español Awards	Best Actress	Rebecca Jones	Nominated	
2011	People en Español Awards	Best Actor	Alejandro Camacho	Nominated	
2011	People en Español Awards	Best Actor	René Strickler	Nominated	
2011	People en Español Awards	Best Supporting Actress	Alejandra Barros	Nominated	
2011	People en Español Awards	Best Supporting Actress	Magda Guzmán	Nominated	
2011	People en Español Awards	Best Supporting Actress	Sophie Alexander	Nominated	
2011	People en Español Awards	Best Supporting Actor	Mark Tacher	Won	
2011	People en Español Awards	Best Villain	Juan Carlos Barreto	Nominated	
2011	People en Español Awards	Revelation of the Year	Alfonso Dosal	Nominated	
2011	People en Español Awards	Couple of the Year	Rebecca Jones; René Strickler	Nominated	
