= La Banda (Mexican TV series) =

- Genre: Heist; Comedy drama
- Created by: Diego Ramírez Schrempp
- Showrunners: Gabriel Nuncio; Alexandro Aldrete
- Starring: Miguel Rodarte; Paulina Gaitán; Tessa Ía; Aldo Escalante Ochoa
- Composers: Pedro "Zulu" González; Esteban Aldrete
- Country of origin: Mexico
- Original language: Spanish
- No. of seasons: 1
- No. of episodes: 8

Production
- Executive producers: Diego Ramírez Schrempp; Juliana Flórez Luna; Andrés Calderón; Gabriel Nuncio; Alexandro Aldrete
- Producer: Gerardo Motta
- Cinematography: Julio Llorente
- Editor: Alejo Alas
- Camera setup: Multi-camera
- Production company: Dynamo

Original release
- Network: Vix
- Release: 24 July 2026

La Banda is a Mexican heist comedy drama television series created by Diego Ramírez Schrempp. It stars Miguel Rodarte, Paulina Gaitán, Tessa Ía and Aldo Escalante Ochoa. The series premiered on Vix on 24 July 2026.

== Plot ==
Víctor Reyes, owner of the company Sanitarios Reyes, designates Rafael as his successor and announces that he will leave his shares to his employees. However, Victor dies before making it official, prompting his son Andy to claim the company. Burdened with debt, Andy looks to sell the factory to a predatory multinational corporation. Determined to save the business, Rafael joins forces with his wife Marcela, who harbors a mysterious past, along with Camilo and Nina, to form an impromptu gang to reclaim the company and save its employees.

== Cast ==
=== Main ===
- Miguel Rodarte as Rafael
- Paulina Gaitán as Marcela
- Tessa Ía as Nina
- Aldo Escalante Ochoa as Camilo

=== Recurring and guest stars ===
- Juan Carlos Colombo as Doc
- Jesús Ochoa as Víctor Reyes
- Fernando Bonilla as Andy
- Aida López as Paloma
- Juan Daniel García Treviño as Greñas
- Martín Saracho as Imanol
- Areli González as Officer Fabiola
- Mariana Villegas as Officer Fernanda
- Raúl Briones as Rivera
- Morena González as Laura
- Roberto Cázares as Paco
- Dunia Alexandra as Bernarda Alba
- Óscar Gordillo as Guillermo
- Abraham Jurado as Omar
- Gabriel Quiróz as Jorge
- Leticia Parra as Nora
- Juan Alanis as Dr. Arroyo
- Saburo Ilda as Nimura
- Priscila Paz as Lupina
- Saúl Sánchez as Father Esteban

== Production ==
The series was announced in June 2023. Filming lasted eight weeks.

== Episodes ==
No.	Title	Directed by	Written by	Original release date
1	"Lo que se sigue y se persigue, se consigue"	Federico Veiroj	Josh Candia	24 July 2026
2	"Esto no es un secuestro"	Federico Veiroj	Josh Candia	24 July 2026
3	"Money, honey"	Federico Veiroj	Carla Sierra, Olfa Masmoudi & Alo Valenzuela	24 July 2026
4	"Parceros"	Federico Veiroj	Alo Valenzuela	24 July 2026
5	"¿Quién se llevó mi queso?"	Salvador Espinosa	Karin Valecillos	24 July 2026
6	"En el norte todos somos primos"	Salvador Espinosa	Carla Sierra	24 July 2026
7	"Casino Night"	Salvador Espinosa	Carla Sierra	24 July 2026
8	"Poquito Time"	Salvador Espinosa	Josh Candia	24 July 2026
