= Alma de hierro =

Mexican telenovela

- Genre: Telenovela; Comedy; Drama; Romance
- Created by: Adrián Suar; Marcela Guerty; Ricardo Rodríguez
- Written by: Ximena Suárez; Aída Guajardo; Marcela Guerty; Rosa Salazar Arenas; Iván Cuevas; Juan Pablo Balcázar
- Directed by: Eric Morales; Xavier Romero
- Starring: Alejandro Camacho; Blanca Guerra; Jorge Poza; Adamari López; Alberto Estrella; Martha Julia; Rafael Inclán; Adrián Uribe
- Opening theme: "Alma de hierro" performed by Fonseca
- Country of origin: Mexico
- Original language: Spanish
- No. of episodes: 398 (original version); 197 (international version)

Production
- Executive producers: Giselle González; Roberto Gómez Fernández
- Production locations: Filming; Televisa San Ángel; Mexico City, Mexico; Locations; Mexico City, Mexico
- Cinematography: Héctor Márquez; Bernardo Nájera; Manuel Ángel Barajas; Luis Arturo Rodríguez
- Camera setup: Multi-camera
- Running time: 21–22 minutes
- Production company: Televisa

Original release
- Network: Canal de las Estrellas
- Release: February 25, 2008 – August 28, 2009

Related
- Son de Fierro (2007)

Alma de hierro (English title: Soul of Steel) is a Mexican telenovela produced by Giselle González and Roberto Gómez Fernández for Televisa in 2008. It is a remake of the Argentinian production Son de Fierro with the characters' names rewritten and adapted to the Mexican audience.

On February 25, 2008, Canal de las Estrellas started broadcasting Alma de hierro weekdays at 10:00pm, replacing Pasión. The last episode was broadcast on August 28, 2009 with Los exitosos Pérez replacing it the following day.

The telenovela stars Alejandro Camacho, Blanca Guerra, Jorge Poza, Adamari López, Alberto Estrella, Martha Julia, Rafael Inclán and Adrián Uribe.

== Plot ==
The protagonists of this telenovela full of anecdotes and told in a comedic tone are the Hierro family. José Antonio Hierro (Alejandro Camacho), a good and friendly but excessively jealous man, whom even his wife calls by his last name, married Elena Jiménez (Blanca Guerra) 25 years ago and today they have three children: Sebastián (Jorge Poza), Sandy (Angelique Boyer), and Wicho (Eddy Vilard). They live decently thanks to the business that Hierro has built with his work: a delicatessen located in front of the house, where, in addition to Hierro and his family, also reside Mimicha (Luz María Aguilar) and Paty (Martha Julia), Elena's mother and sister, Angelito (Alberto Estrella), Hierro's brother, and Ezequiel (Adrián Uribe), whom Elena and Hierro picked up from the street and have cared for like another son.

Sebastián lost his sight at the age of ten, so Elena stopped teaching to help him adapt to his new life. Today he has a degree in History and teaches that subject at the high school that his brother, Wicho, attends. Renata (Zuria Vega), a charming and rebellious teenager, is also enrolled there.

Sandy is the pride of her father and studies Medicine, although she also has a vocation for dancing and showbiz. She knows that Hierro would never allow her to change her profession, but she has the support of her paternal grandfather, with whom Hierro has not spoken for 30 years, because he does not forgive him for discovering at age 40 that his sexual orientation had changed becoming gay and, at the same time, whitewashing the situation before his family and society which, in Hierro's eyes, was what caused the illness and death of his mother.

Wicho is an immature, rebellious and funny young man who doesn't know what he wants and feels that he is the one to whom nobody pays attention in the family.

Both Sebastián and Wicho fall in love with the same young woman: Renata Higareda, the rebellious teenager, who turns out to be the daughter of Saúl Higareda (Juan Verduzco), the man Elena was going to marry before meeting Hierro.

Saúl, although years later married another woman, could never forget her. Today he has returned to Mexico, divorced and with an important position in National Education, and he has called Elena to work alongside him because he is determined to get her back, no matter what he has to do to achieve it. He will even have to face the fact that Wicho has fallen in love like a fool with his daughter, Renata, while she has in turn fallen in love, and very sincerely, with the visually impaired Sebastián, Elena's other son.

Mimicha, being from a wealthy run-down family, has never resigned herself to the fact that her daughter, Elena, has married “a sausage maker” and she supports and encourages the rapprochement between Saúl and her. But when this becomes difficult, she decides that her younger daughter, Paty, will be the one who manages to win over the public official she wants as a son-in-law.

This complicates things and causes great pain for Angelito, who has fallen in love with Paty, whom he sees as his soul mate since neither of them has ever worked and they like to live at the expense of others: Paty, with her feminine charms and her high-born surname, and Angelito being a scoundrel particularly skilled at dealing, entanglement and deception that yield immediate profits.

Very soon Saúl's world is turned upside down with the emergence into his life of Elena's three children, in addition to the problems that Hierro will cause him while defending his marriage, because the Hierros know very well how to defend what they love.

The problem for the other two Hierro males is that they face their own blood: Hierro against Hierro for the love of Renata, forming an entertaining triangle that Rita (Adamari López), Sebastián's assistant, will break to win the love of the Professor, whom she obsessively adores.

After unexpected reactions and interventions, the love triangles end and results in important lessons for each family member who truly has a Soul of Steel.

== Cast ==
=== Main ===
- Alejandro Camacho as José Antonio Hierro Ramírez
- Blanca Guerra as Elena Jiménez de la Corcuera de Hierro
- Jorge Poza as Sebastián Hierro Jiménez
- Adamari López as Rita Anguiano Carbajal
- Alberto Estrella as Ángel "Angelito" Hierro Ramírez
- Martha Julia as Patricia "Paty" Jiménez de la Corcuera
- Rafael Inclán as Ignacio "Nacho" Hierro González
- Adrián Uribe as Ezequiel "Eze" Hierro Jiménez

=== Also main ===
- Zuria Vega as Renata Higareda Fontana
- Juan Verduzco as Saúl Higareda
- Moisés Suárez as Gregorio Ortega
- Juan Carlos Colombo as Rafael "Rafa"
- Eddy Vilard as Luis "Wicho" Hierro Jiménez
- Angelique Boyer as Sandra "Sandy" Hierro Jiménez
- Gaby Carrillo as Karina "Kari" López Velasco
- Marifer Malo as Lorena "Lore" Higareda Pineda
- Miguel Rodarte as Aristeo "Ari" Villegas / Raymundo "Ray" Villegas
- Flavio Medina as Amadeo López Velasco
- Darío Ripoll as Monchi
- Marcia Coutiño as Maribel
- Manzana as María José "Majo" Ibarrola Camargo
- Alejandra Barros as Mariana Camargo
- Lisardo as Diego Galindo

=== Recurring and guest stars ===
- Luz Maria Aguilar as Matilde "Mimicha" de la Corcuera Viuda de Jiménez
- Rafael Amador as Dr. Heredia
- Agustín Arana as Gibrán
- Juan Ignacio Aranda as Simón
- Mariana Ávila as Jessica
- Nuria Bages as Rita Carbajal
- Isabel Benet as Ana
- Odiseo Bichir as Osvaldo Ibarrola
- Delia Casanova as Perpetua
- Patricio Castillo as Claudio
- Sergio Corona as Bernardo
- Karla Cossío as Cinthya
- David del Real as Paparazzi
- Dorismar as Romina
- Maru Dueñas as Sonia
- Luis Gatica as Abraham Elizondo
- Macaria as Ángela de Camargo
- Isabel Madow as Arabella Gómez
- Jessica Más as Florencia
- Sergio Ochoa as Daniel
- Manuel Ojeda as Alfredo Camargo
- David Ostrosky as Alonso Ferrer
- Alex Peniche as "El Pájaro"
- Danny Perea as Carla
- Mario Prudom as Javier Carvajal
- Jana Raluy as Dr. Lizárraga
- Gustavo Rojo as Pierre
- Tiaré Scanda as Juliana Díaz
- Juan Carlos Serrán as Rodolfo Molina
- Mark Tacher as Gael Ferrer
- Teo Tapia as Quintero
- Marco Uriel as Fernando Arreola
- Grettell Valdéz as Melissa
- Christian Vega as Pedro "Pedrito"
- Lorena Velázquez as Victoria
- Liza Willer as Cidronia
- Sherlyn Zuckerman as Danna

== Awards and nominations ==
Year	Award	Category	Nominee(s)	Result
2008	TV Adicto Golden Awards	Best Leading Actor	Rafael Inclán	Won
2008	TV Adicto Golden Awards	Best Character Design	Alma de hierro	Won
2009	TVyNovelas Awards	Best Telenovela	Giselle González; Roberto Gómez Fernández	Nominated
2009	TVyNovelas Awards	Best Actress	Blanca Guerra	Won
2009	TVyNovelas Awards	Best Actor	Alejandro Camacho	Won
2009	TVyNovelas Awards	Best Antagonist Actress	Adamari López	Nominated
2009	TVyNovelas Awards	Best Leading Actor	Rafael Inclán	Nominated
2009	TVyNovelas Awards	Best Co-lead Actress	Alejandra Barros	Nominated
2009	TVyNovelas Awards	Best Co-lead Actor	Jorge Poza	Won
2009	TVyNovelas Awards	Best Female Revelation	Zuria Vega	Won
2009	TVyNovelas Awards	Best Male Revelation	Eddy Vilard	Won
2009	TVyNovelas Awards	Best Original Story or Adaptation	Adrián Suar; Ximena Suárez; Aída Guajardo	Won
2009	TVyNovelas Awards	Best Direction	Eric Morales; Xavier Romero	Won
2009	TVyNovelas Awards	Best Direction of the Cameras	Héctor Márquez; Bernardo Nájera	Won
2009	Bravo Awards	Best Telenovela	Giselle González; Roberto Gómez Fernández	Won
2009	Bravo Awards	Best Actor	Jorge Poza	Won
2009	Bravo Awards	Best Leading Actress	Blanca Guerra	Won
2009	Bravo Awards	Best Leading Actor	Alejandro Camacho	Won
2009	Bravo Awards	Best Female Revelation	Zuria Vega	Won
2009	Bravo Awards	Best Child Performance	Manzana	Won
2009	Bravo Awards	Best Adapted Screenplay	Ximena Suárez; Aída Guajardo	Won
2009	People en Español Awards	Best Actress	Blanca Guerra	Nominated
2009	People en Español Awards	Best Actor	Alejandro Camacho	Nominated
2009	People en Español Awards	Surprise of the Year	Jorge Poza	Nominated
2009	People en Español Awards	Surprise of the Year	Zuria Vega	Nominated
2009	People en Español Awards	Best Remake	Alma de hierro	Nominated
2009	GLAAD Awards	Outstanding Telenovela	Giselle González; Roberto Gómez Fernández	Won
