= I Don't Trust Men Anymore =

Mexican telenovela

- Genre: Telenovela
- Created by: Caridad Bravo
- Based on: Yo no creo en los hombres by Marcia del Río
- Written by: Felipe Ortiz
- Screenplay by: Aída Guajardo
- Directed by: Eric Morales; Xavier Romero; Luis Vélez
- Starring: Alejandro Camacho; Adriana Louvier; Gabriel Soto; Flavio Medina
- Theme music composer: Eduardo Murguía; Mauricio Arriaga
- Opening theme: "Yo no creo en los hombres" by Diana Reyes
- Country of origin: Mexico
- Original language: Spanish
- No. of episodes: 121

Production
- Executive producer: Giselle González
- Producer: Julieta de la O
- Production locations: Mexico City, Mexico
- Cinematography: Armando Zafra; Bernardo Nájera; Jorge Amaya; Lino Gama
- Editor: Juan Franco
- Camera setup: Multi-camera
- Production company: Televisa

Original release
- Network: Canal de las Estrellas
- Release: September 1, 2014 – February 15, 2015

Related
- El color de la pasión; Que te perdone Dios; No creo en los hombres; Yo no creo en los hombres; Velo de novia

I Don't Trust Men Anymore (Spanish: Yo no creo en los hombres), is a Mexican telenovela produced by Giselle González for Televisa. It is based on Yo no creo en los hombres (1991), produced by Lucy Orozco.

Critically acclaimed, it was the most awarded telenovela of 2014 and is widely considered to be one of the best telenovelas of the decade.

It stars Alejandro Camacho, Adriana Louvier, Gabriel Soto and Flavio Medina.

Production of Yo no creo en los hombres officially started on July 7, 2014.

== Plot ==
María Dolores (Adriana Louvier) is a poor, noble-minded girl with a great talent for making haute couture dresses. When her father is tragically murdered in a robbery, she meets Maximiliano Bustamante (Gabriel Soto), an attractive and honest lawyer who offers to help her. Although they feel strongly for each other, they both have romantic commitments; he is engaged to be married to Maleny Santibáñez (Sophie Alexander), a spoiled and capricious young socialite who doesn't really love him and is cheating on him with Ari (Lenny de la Rosa), her tennis coach.

María Dolores is courted by Julián (Pedro de Tavira), an honest, kind-hearted young man who suffers from a degenerative disease and whom she has always seen as a brother. However, she is deeply in love with Daniel Santibáñez (Flavio Medina), an unscrupulous junior who ends up tricking her into a fake wedding and abandoning her to her fate while she is pregnant.

Daniel marries Ivana Duval (Sonia Franco), a young millionaire who is not physically attractive and cannot have children. Maximiliano ends his engagement to Maleny when he discovers that she is not the woman he thought she was because she has a lover.

María Dolores tries to move on with her life and raise her child, but Daniel continues to harass her to force her to stay with him. On one occasion, when Daniel intents to sexually abuse her, Julián tries to defend her and Daniel ends up murdering him, blaming María Dolores for his death. Ivana witnesses the murder but says nothing because she believes María Dolores to be a wicked woman who coaxed her husband and also had Julián as her lover.

María Dolores gives birth in prison. Daniel and Ivana take her child from her through legal means. Maximiliano takes on the case and dedicates himself to proving María Dolores's innocence. During the trial, the two fall in love, but are ultimately separated in a cruel and painful way for the protagonist.

María Dolores will regain her freedom and fight to win back her child and the man she cherishes. The man who proved to her that there could be men that she could trust.

== Cast ==
=== Main ===
- Alejandro Camacho as Claudio
- Adriana Louvier as María Dolores
- Gabriel Soto as Maximiliano
- Flavio Medina as Daniel

=== Recurring and guest stars ===
- Azela Robinson as Josefa
- Luz María Jerez as Alma
- Rosa María Bianchi as Úrsula
- Cecilia Toussaint as Honoria
- Macaria as Esperanza
- Adalberto Parra as Jacinto
- Juan Carlos Colombo as Fermín
- Sonia Franco as Ivana
- Pedro de Tavira as Julián
- Fabiola Guajardo as Isela
- Jorge Gallegos as Orlando
- Lenny de la Rosa as Ari
- Estefanía Villarreal as Doris
- Pablo Perroni as Gerry
- Elizabeth Guindi as Susana
- Eleane Puell as Clara
- Jesús Carús as Leonardo
- Adriana Llabrés as Jenny
- Tizoc Arroyo as Adrián
- José Montini as El Gordo
- Jesús Ochoa as Marcelo
- Angelina Peláez as La Abuela
- Aurora Clavel as Chelo
- Violeta Isfel as Nayeli
- Jana Raluy as Marcia
- Aleyda Gallardo as Socorro
- Ximena Ballinas as Sandra
- José de Jesús Aguilar as Father Juan
- José Ángel García as Rodolfo
- Emma Escalante as Corina
- Rubén Camelo as Víctor
- Isadora González as La Tecolota
- Sophie Alexander as Maleny
- Juan Carlos Barreto as Arango

== Ratings ==
Timeslot (ET/PT)	No. of episodes	Premiered		Ended	
Timeslot (ET/PT)	No. of episodes	Date	Premiere Ratings	Date	Finale Ratings
Monday to Friday 6:20PM	121	September 1, 2014	17.5	February 15, 2015	23.3

== Awards and nominations ==
Year	Association	Category	Nominee(s)	Result
2014	TV Adicto Golden Awards	Best Special Performance	Adalberto Parra	Won
2014	TV Adicto Golden Awards	Best Debut Actress in a Lead Role	Adriana Louvier	Won
2014	TV Adicto Golden Awards	Best Adaptation	Aída Guajardo; Felipe Ortiz; Berenice Cárdenas; Gerardo Pérez; Claudia Ortega	Won
2014	TV Adicto Golden Awards	Best Male Character	Daniel Santibáñez (Flavio Medina)	Won
2014	TV Adicto Golden Awards	Best Female Character	Ivana (Sonia Franco)	Won
2014	TV Adicto Golden Awards	Best Direction	Yo no creo en los hombres	Won
2014	TV Adicto Golden Awards	Special Award for Great; Telenovela of the Year	Yo no creo en los hombres	Won
2015	TVyNovelas Awards	Best Telenovela	Giselle González	Nominated
2015	TVyNovelas Awards	Best Actress	Adriana Louvier	Won
2015	TVyNovelas Awards	Best Actor	Gabriel Soto	Nominated
2015	TVyNovelas Awards	Best Antagonist Actress	Azela Robinson	Nominated
2015	TVyNovelas Awards	Best Antagonist Actor	Flavio Medina	Won
2015	TVyNovelas Awards	Best Leading Actress	Rosa María Bianchi	Won
2015	TVyNovelas Awards	Best Co-lead Actress	Fabiola Guajardo	Won
2015	TVyNovelas Awards	Best Supporting Actress	Cecilia Toussaint	Won
2015	TVyNovelas Awards	Best Supporting Actress	Macaria	Nominated
2015	TVyNovelas Awards	Best Supporting Actor	Juan Carlos Colombo	Nominated
2015	TVyNovelas Awards	Best Young Lead Actress	Estefanía Villarreal	Nominated
2015	TVyNovelas Awards	Best Original Story or Adaptation	Aída Guajardo; Felipe Ortiz	Nominated
2015	TVyNovelas Awards	Best Direction	Eric Morales; Xavier Romero; Luis Vélez	Won
2015	TVyNovelas Awards	Best Cast	Giselle González	Won
2015	TVyNovelas Awards (Audience's Favorites)	Favorite Finale	Giselle González	Nominated
2015	TVyNovelas Awards (Audience's Favorites)	The Most Handsome Man	Gabriel Soto	Won
2015	TVyNovelas Awards (Audience's Favorites)	Favorite Female Villain	Azela Robinson	Won
2015	TVyNovelas Awards (Audience's Favorites)	Favorite Female Villain	Rosa María Bianchi	Nominated
2015	TVyNovelas Awards (Audience's Favorites)	Favorite Male Villain	Flavio Medina	Won
2015	TVyNovelas Awards (Audience's Favorites)	Favorite Slap	Fabiola Guajardo; Azela Robinson	Won
2015	TVyNovelas Awards (Audience's Favorites)	Favorite Kiss	Adriana Louvier; Gabriel Soto	Won
2015	TVyNovelas Awards (Audience's Favorites)	Favorite Couple	Adriana Louvier; Gabriel Soto	Won
2015	Bravo Awards	Best Telenovela	Giselle González	Won
2015	Bravo Awards	Best Actress	Adriana Louvier	Won
2015	Bravo Awards	Best Actor	Gabriel Soto	Won
2015	Bravo Awards	Best Antagonist Actress	Azela Robinson	Won
2015	Bravo Awards	Best Antagonist Actor	Flavio Medina	Won
2015	Bravo Awards	Best Leading Actress	Rosa María Bianchi	Won
2016	Latin ACE Awards	Best Soap	Yo no creo en los hombres	Won
2016	Latin ACE Awards	Best Actor	Gabriel Soto	Won
2016	Latin ACE Awards	Best Supporting Actress	Rosa María Bianchi	Won

== See also ==
- List of telenovelas of Televisa
