= Mariana Ávila =

Mexican actress and singer

- Born: Mariana Ávila de la Torre; April 15, 1979 (age 47); Mexico City, D.F., Mexico
- Occupations: Actress, singer
- Years active: 1993–present

Mariana Ávila (born Mariana Ávila de la Torre on April 15, 1979) is a Mexican actress and singer.

== Early life ==
Ávila was born in Mexico City, D.F., Mexico. She started her acting career when she was six years old in a stage play called El pájaro azul. At 12, she got the starring role in Little Orphan Annie in which she had to sing and dance. At 14, she performed in Cinderella and in the TV show El club de Gaby.

She studied acting in the juvenile workshop of Pedro Damián and in 1996 in the CEA (Artistic Training Center at Televisa). Currently she is part of a musical group called "Mamá no sabe nada" produced by the record company Melody.

== Filmography ==
Telenovelas
Year	Title	Role	Notes
1995–96	Retrato de familia	Mónica Bárcenas	Supporting role
1999	Rosalinda	Carolina Pérez Romero	Supporting role
2000	Locura de amor	Dafne Hurtado	Supporting role
2000–01	Carita de Ángel	Cassandra Gamboa Campos	Antagonist
2003–04	Clap, el lugar de tus sueños	Florencia	Supporting role
2005	Contra viento y marea	Zarela Balmaceda Sandoval	Supporting role
2008	Querida Enemiga	Mónica Gaitán	Supporting role
2008–09	Alma de Hierro	Jessica	Special appearance
2009–10	Camaleones	Carmen Castillo	Supporting role
2018	Educando a Nina	Milagros (Mili)	Supporting role
TV series
Year	Title	Role	Notes
1993	El club de Gaby	Mariana	
2001–03	Mujer, Casos de la Vida Real		Various episodes
2007	RBD: La Familia	Mimí	
2008	La rosa de Guadalupe		Episode: "La fuerza del corazón"
2009	Tiempo final	Sofía	
2014	Como dice el dicho		Episode: "En la cama y en la cárcel"
Films
Year	Title	Role	Notes
1998	La primera noche	Mariana	
1999	La segunda noche	Susana	
2003	El espejo	Laura	
2005	La última noche	Luzma	
2007	Violentos recuerdos	Marina	
2007	Cañitas	Sofía	
2008	El garabato	María luisa	
2010	XXL Extragrande	Yeni	
2019	Reto 4 Elementos	Herself	
