= Jesús Ochoa (actor) =

Mexican actor (born 1959)

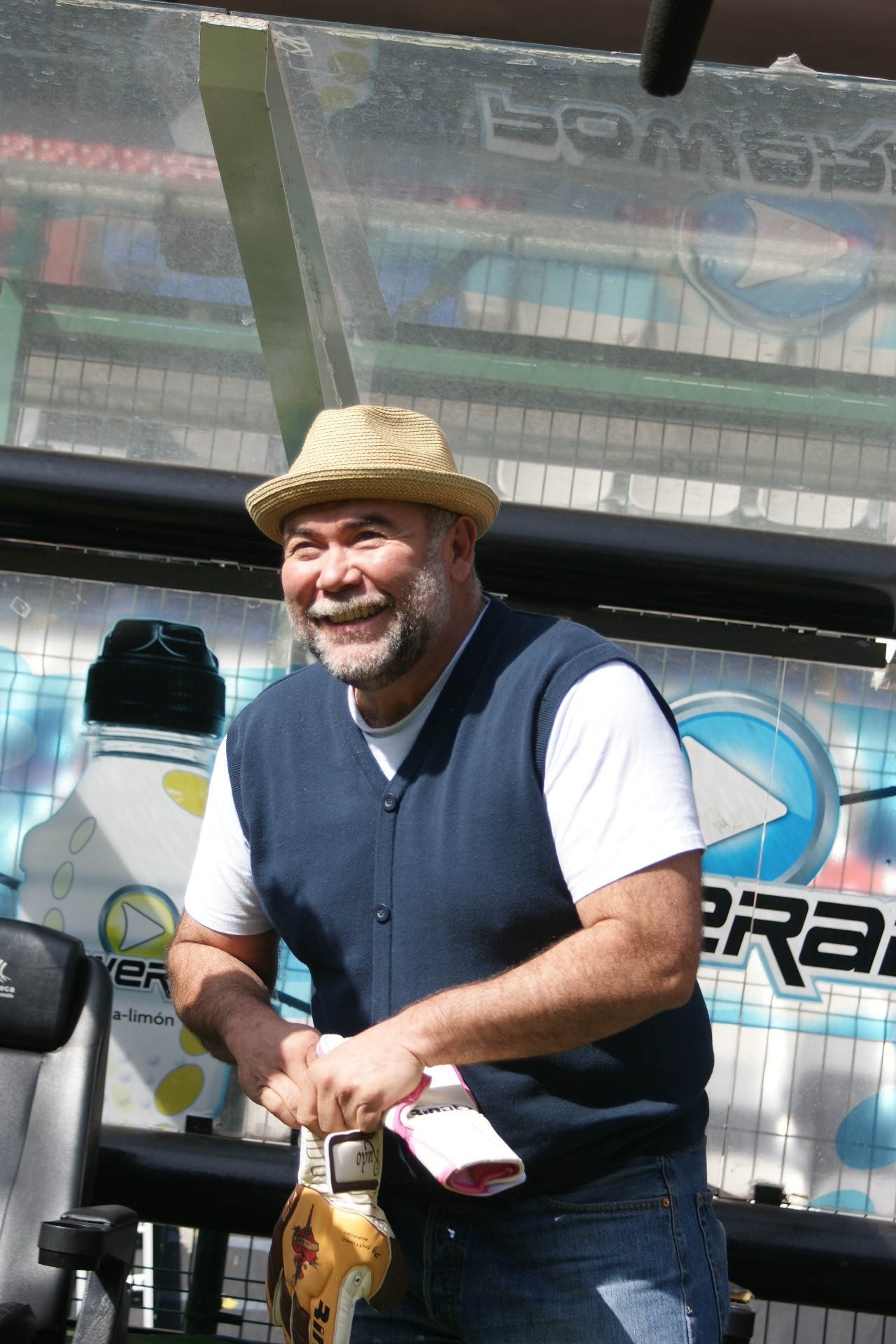
- Ochoa in 2008
- Born: Jesús Alberto Domínguez Ochoa; December 24, 1959 (age 66); Ures, Sonora, Mexico
- Occupation: Actor
- Years active: 1974–present
- Spouse: María Eugenia Leñero (m. 1998)
- Children: Jesusa Ochoa Leñero (daughter)

Jesús Ochoa (Spanish pronunciation: [xeˈsus oˈtʃoa]; born December 24, 1959) is a Mexican actor.

== Life and career ==
Ochoa was born in Ures, Sonora, Mexico, the son of Manuel Ochoa Martínez and María Cruz Domínguez de Ochoa. At fourteen, he moved to Hermosillo to continue his studies at Normal del Estado.

In 1974, he began his artistic career when he appeared in several plays in Hermosillo. In 1979, he moved to Mexico City to study at the Instituto de Arte Escénico until 1984, in which he began to perform university theater with José Ramón Enriquez in Ciudad sin sueños. In 1985, he returned to Hermosillo and acted in the popular play La Tuba de Goyo Trejo, also participated in several commercials and television shows. He stayed in the city until 1991, when he returned to Mexico City starting with the play El Jefe Maximo, for which he was nominated as Revelation of the year by the Critics and Chronists Theater Union. During the next few years, Ochoa continued to perform in many plays, films, telenovelas, and TV shows. In April 1998, he married María Eugenia Leñero and they currently live in Mexico City.

== Filmography ==
=== Film ===
Year	Title	Role	Notes
1994	Dos crímenes	Fernando	
1994	Ponchada	Man	Short film
1995	El callejón de los milagros	Parroquiano	
1995	Desiertos mares	Hombre del Norte	
1995	Sin remitente	Forensic surgeon	
1996	Entre Pancho Villa y una mujer desnuda	Pancho Villa	
1996	Sucesos distantes	Hércules	
1997	Et hjørne af paradis	Scarface	
1998	Bajo California: El límite del tiempo	Arce	
1998	Cilantro y perejil	Capitán	
1999	La mirada de la ausencia		Short film
1999	La ley de Herodes	Nuevo alcalde	
2000	Sin dejar huella	Mendizábel	
2000	Crónica de un desayuno	Voceador	
2000	Los maravillosos olores de la vida		Short film
2001	Haciendas pulqueras	Narrator	Short film
2001	El segundo aire	Moisés	
2002	Ciudades oscuras	Riquelme	
2002	Asesino en serio	Comandante Martínez	
2003	Tiro de gracia		Also writer and director
2003	Carambola	El Mexicano	
2003	Nicotina	Tomson	
2003	Ladies' Night	Sacerdote	
2004	Puños rosas	Chicote	
2004	Man on Fire	Víctor Fuentes	
2004	Zapata: El sueño de un héroe	Victoriano Huerta	
2004	Zapato	Globero	Short film
2004	Voces inocentes	Chofer	
2004	Conejo en la luna	Macedonio Ramírez	
2005	La sombra del sahuaro	Don Miguel	
2005	Hijas de su madre: Las Buenrostro	Macario	
2006	Only God Knows	Comprador del Auto	
2006	Un mundo maravilloso	El Tamal	
2006	Interrupción en el continuo espacio tiempo	Voz del hombre	Short film
2006	Sexo, amor y otras perversiones 2	Chucho	
2007	Padre Nuestro	Diego	
2007	J-ok'el	Capitán Flores	
2007	Año uña	Additional Voices	
2007	Cementerio de papel	Director del AGN	
2008	Beverly Hills Chihuahua	Officer Ramirez	
2008	Quantum of Solace	Lt. Orso	
2011	Between Us	Rodolfo	
2011	La cebra	Álvaro Obregón	
2011	Salvando al soldado Pérez	Chema Díaz	
2012	El Santos vs. La Tetona Mendoza	Diablo Zepada (voice)	
2012	The Fantastic World of Juan Orol	General Cruz	
2012	Get the Gringo	Caracas	
2013	Instructions Not Included	Himself	Cameo
2014	The Popcorn Chronicles	Cochigordo	
2018	Overboard	Vito	
2019	Powder	Doctor	
2020	Un rescate de huevitos	Rey Leonidas I (voice)	

=== Television ===
Year	Title	Role	Notes
1992	Ángeles sin paraíso		
1995	Si Dios me quita la vida		
1995–1996	Retrato de familia		
1996	Marisol	Fortunato	
1997	Madame le Consul	Héctor	Episode: "Les disparus de la Sierra Madre"
1998	Amor infiel	Leopoldo Mirabal	
2001	Amores querer con alevosía	Miguel Ángel	
2002	La duda	Santiago	
2006	Campeones de la vida	Jesús "Chucho" Duarte	
2007	Se busca un hombre	Pepe	
2008	Tiempo final	Various	Episode: "Pito final"
2009	Ellas son, la alegría del hogar	Voz de Mundo (voice)	
2010–2011	Para volver a amar	Rolando Salgar "El Cachetes"	
2011	Los héroes del norte	El Comandante	Episode: "La despedida"
2012	Lynch	Julio Villalonga "El Tren"	Episode: "Llorando sobre la leche derramada"
2012	Por ella soy Eva	Adriano Reyes	Main role
2013	La Promesa	Vicente Ardellano	
2013	Libre para amarte	Zacarías del Pino	Supporting role
2014–2015	Yo no creo en los hombres	Licencidado Marcelo Monterubio	Supporting role
2016	El hotel de los secretos	Serapio Ayala	Supporting role
2017	El Bienamado	Odorico Cienfuegos	Lead role
2018	Por amar sin ley	Taxista	Guest star (Season 1)
2020	Narcos: Mexico	Juan Nepomuceno Guerra	Seasons 2–3
2026	Hermanas, un amor compartido	Abelardo Correa Bojórquez	Supporting role
2026	La Banda	Víctor Reyes	Guest star

=== Other work ===
- Appears in the music video for 50 Cent's rap song "Just a Lil Bit" in which he plays a gangster in a yacht with a girl, who drugs and leaves him at his mercy
- He appears as a butcher in the music video for the Morcheeba single, "Be Yourself"

== Awards and nominations ==
Year	Award	Category	Works	Result
1996	Ariel Award	Best Supporting Actor	Entre Pancho Villa y una mujer desnuda	Won
1999	Ariel Award	Best Supporting Actor	Bajo California: El límite del tiempo	Won
2003	MTV Movie Award	Favorite Villain	Ciudades oscuras	Nominated
2004	MTV Movie Award	Best Cameo	Ladies' Night	Nominated
2005	Silver Goddess Award	Best Male Co-Performance	Conejo en la luna	Nominated
