= Vida robada (1991 TV series) =

- Genre: Telenovela; Drama
- Created by: Marissa Garrido
- Written by: Marissa Garrido
- Directed by: Luis Vélez
- Starring: Erika Buenfil; Sergio Goyri; Cynthia Klitbo; Fernando Luján; Rosa María Bianchi; Sonia Furió; Fernando Sáenz
- Opening theme: In Surge of by Attila Galamb
- Country of origin: Mexico
- Original language: Spanish
- No. of episodes: 75

Production
- Executive producer: Carlos Sotomayor
- Producer: Rafael Urióstegui
- Production locations: Durango, Mexico
- Cinematography: Carlos Guerra Villareal
- Running time: 41-44 minutes
- Production company: Televisa

Original release
- Network: Canal de las Estrellas
- Release: October 2, 1991 – January 17, 1992

Related
- Ha llegado una intrusa (1974)

Vida robada (English title: Stolen life) is a Mexican telenovela produced by Carlos Sotomayor for Televisa in 1991. It is a remake of 1974 Mexican telenovela Ha llegado una intrusa.

Erika Buenfil and Sergio Goyri starred as protagonists, while Cynthia Klitbo and Rosa María Bianchi starred as antagonists.

== Plot ==
Gabriela is a good and generous young woman studying at a university, without knowing who pays for her education since she has no family. After a series of circumstances, she decides to replace a classmate Leticia, a rich and vicious girl who after escaping never returned home.

== Cast ==
- Erika Buenfil as Gabriela Durán Carrasco/Leticia Avelar
- Sergio Goyri as Carlos Medina
- Cynthia Klitbo as Leticia Avelar/Verónica Almeida (antagonist)
- Fernando Luján as Don Ramón Avelar
- Rosa María Bianchi as Irene Avelar (antagonist)
- Sonia Furió as Carlota Carvajal
- Fernando Sáenz as Gabino
- Queta Carrasco as Juventina
- Romina Castro as Anaísa
- Juan Carlos Colombo as Ernesto Lascuráin
- Joaquín Garrido as Cuco
- Constantino Costas as Tony Hansen
- José Antonio Ferral as Pancho
- Raúl Magaña as Luis
- Silvia Mariscal as Daniela
- Guy de Saint Cyr as Guillermo Alvarado
- Jacqueline Munguía as Rosita
- Aída Naredo as Corina
- Juan Felipe Preciado as Anselmo Medina
- Martha Resnikoff as Lupe
- Luis Rivera as Rubén Carvajal
- Sergio Sánchez as Felipe
- Yadira Santana as Nelly Carvajal
- Jorge Urzúa as Jorge
- Lucy Tame as Claudia
- Dacia Arcaráz as Leonor Carvajal
- Benjamín Islas as Inspector
- Brenda Oliver
- Fabiola Campomanes
- Dinorah Cavazos
- Eva Díaz
- Israel Jaitovich
- Luis Ángel Nerey
- José Antonio Sánchez
- Fernando Rivera
- Estela Ruiz
