= Alejandra Barros =

Mexican actress

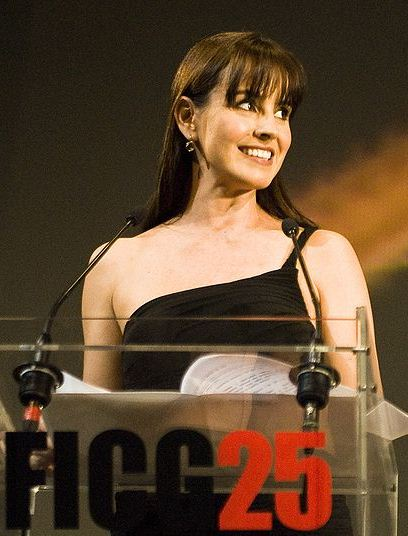
- Born: Alejandra Barros del Campo; August 11, 1971 (age 55); Mexico City, Mexico
- Occupation: Actress
- Years active: 1996 - present
- Spouse: Luis Manuel Peralta (m. 2000; div. 2003)
- Children: 1

Alejandra Barros (born Alejandra Barros del Campo on August 11, 1971) is a Mexican actress. She is best known for her role in Televisa's telenovela Mariana de la Noche (2003).

== Biography ==
Barros studied in New York in The Lee Strasberg Theater Institute to study acting; she later transferred over to Actors Studio Film & T.V School where she studied film and television, and in the Broadway Dance Center, tap and jazz. After living a couple of years in New York City, Barros moved back to Mexico City and enrolled in an acting school to brush-up her acting skills.

After having studied acting and film, Barros received her first opportunity to act in the telenovela Huracán, sharing credits with Alejandro Camacho and Rebecca Jones. She later came to act in telenovelas such as Locura de Amor, a production led by Roberto Gómez Fernández.

Her first stage role was Malcom y su lucha contra los Eunucos, by director Alejandro Bichir, presented at the festival of theater in Málaga, Spain. Other stage work includes the Mexican adaptation of Patrick Marber's play, Closer alongside Bruno Bichir. In 2009/2010, Barros co-starred with Tony Dalton in Bernard Slade's Same Time Next Year.

After working in Mexican television for several years, Barros was given her first starring role in the 2003 telenovela Mariana de la Noche where she essayed the title character with Jorge Salinas as her leading man. In 2006, Barros co-starred in the Mexican telenovela remake of 1986's El Camino Secreto, now titled La Verdad Oculta opposite Eduardo Yáñez. Both versions were written by Jose Rendon. In 2008/2009, she appeared with Alejandro Camacho in Alma de Hierro. She teamed up with Camacho and Jones once again in 2010's critically acclaimed Para Volver a Amar by Gómez Fernández and Giselle González, where she portrayed Bárbara Mantilla, the suffering, yet flighty and carefree wife of an abusive alcoholic. For her efforts, Barros won the award for Best Actress in a Co-Starring Role given by Revista TV y Novelas in their annual Premios gala on March 6, 2011.

Also in 2010, Alejandra Barros co-starred with Eugenio Derbez in the romantic comedy No Eres Tu, Soy Yo which went on to become one of the highest-grossing films in Mexican cinema history.

In 2013, Alejandra Barros acted in Carlos Moreno Laguillo's telenovela: Quiero Amarte. A year later, she joined the production of Mapat Lopez Zatarain in La sombra del pasado, giving life to the main antagonist Candela Rivero de Mendoza. In 2015, she joined the production of Carlos Moreno Laguillo's A que no me dejas, again as the main antagonist Julieta Olmedo Rodriguez de Cordova.

In 2016, she won the lead role in the series Mujeres de negro.

== Filmography ==
Telenovelas, Series, TV Show, Films
Year	Title	Role	Notes
1985-07	Mujer casos de la vida real	Araceli	Episodio: Entre Abrismos & Mala Reputacion
1996	Confidente de secundaria	Laura	Supporting role
1997-98	Huracán	Rocío Medina	Supporting role
2000	Locura de amor	Beatriz Sandoval	Supporting role
2000-01	Por un beso	Thelma	Guest star
2001	Atrévete a olvidarme	Olga Bocker de Rivas-Montaño	Supporting role
2001	María Belén	Valeria Montaño de Sanz	Supporting role
2001-02	Navidad sin fin	Angelita	TV Mini-series
2002-03	Clase 406	Adriana Pineda Suarez/Angela Pineda Suárez	Lead role
2003-04	Mariana de la noche	Elisa Madrigal/Mariana Montenegro Madrigal/Mariana Lugo-Navarro Madrigal	Lead role
2004	Matando Cabos	Líder Extraterrestre	Film
2005	Fear Factor VIP	Herself/co-hostess	TV show
2005	Vibe	Herself/Contestant	TV show
2005	La madrastra	Diana	Guest star
2006	La verdad oculta	Alejandra Balmori Genoves	Lead role
2006	Mejor es que Gabriela no se muera		Film
2007	Sultanes del Sur	Turista en Avion	Film
2007	El viaje de la Nonna	Creativa Ana	Film
2007	13 Miedos Intercambio	Cristina	31 episodes
2007-08	Yo amo a Juan Querendón	Susana	Guest star
2008	S.O.S.: Sexo y otros secretos		
2008	Mujeres asesinas	Jessica Suarez	Episode: "Jessica, tóxica"
2008-09	Alma de hierro	Mariana Camargo de Hierro	Main role
2009	Amar	Virginia	Film
2009-10	Hasta que el dinero nos separe	Alicia Ávila del Villar	Guest star
2010	Seres: Genesis	Doctora Mariel	Film
2010	No eres tu, soy yo	Maria	Film
2010	Para volver a amar	Bárbara Mantilla de Espinosa	Main role
2011	Viento en Contra	Sofía Navarrete	Film
2012	Sueños del Caribe	Florina de Dios	Film
2013-14	Quiero amarte	Juliana Montesinos Carmona de la Parra	Main role
2014-15	La sombra del pasado	Candela Rivero de Mendoza	Main role
2015-16	A que no me dejas	Julieta Olmedo Rodriguez de Córdova	Main role
2016	Mujeres de negro	Jacqueline "Jackie" Acosta de Rivera	Lead role
2018	Hijas de la luna	Rosaura Nieto	Guest star
2018	Y mañana será otro día	Diana Alcántara Lazcano de Sarmiento	Lead role
2020	La Doña	Eleonora Rojas de Navarrete	Recurring role (season 2)
2021	Buscando a Frida	Rafaela Pons de Terán	Main role
2022	Los ricos también lloran	Daniela Montesinos	Main role
2022	Vencer la ausencia	Celeste Machado	Main role
2023	Nadie como tú	Teresa Arreola Villaseñor	Main role
2024	El precio de amarte	Eduarda Ferreira	Main role
2025	Juegos de amor y poder	Mariana Avendaño	Main role
2026	Mi rival	Paloma	Lead role

== Awards and nominations ==
Year	Award	Category	Telenovela	Result
2007	Premios TVyNovelas	Best Lead Actress	La Verdad Oculta	Nominated
2009	Premios TVyNovelas	Best Co-star Actress	Alma de Hierro	Nominated
2011	Premios TVyNovelas	Best Co-star Actress	Para Volver a Amar	Won
2009	Premios A.P.T	Best Couple Revelation	El próximo año a la misma hora	Won
