= Roberto Gómez Fernández =

Mexican producer, artist, actor and comedian

- Born: Roberto Gómez Fernández; March 14, 1964 (age 61); México City, D.F., México
- Occupations: Producer, artist, actor, comedian
- Years active: 1985-present
- Spouses: Kim Bolívar Martín (m. 1984; div. 1990) Chantal Andere (m. 2001; div. 2006) Jessica Coch (m. 2010; div. 2011) Krystell Padilla (m. 2017)
- Children: 2
- Parent(s): Roberto Mario Gómez y Bolaños (Chespirito); Graciela Fernández Pierre
- Relatives: Florinda Meza García (Stepmother); Horacio Gómez Bolaños (Uncle)

Roberto Gómez Fernández (born March 14, 1964, in México City, D.F., México) is a Mexican producer, artist, actor and comedian.

== Early life ==
Gómez Fernández was born in México City, the son of comedian and actor Roberto Gómez Bolaños and his wife, Graciela Fernández.

== Personal life ==
In 2001, Gómez Fernández married actress Chantal Andere; they divorced in 2006. A few years later, in 2010, he married actress Jessica Coch; their marriage ended in divorce a year later in 2011. He then married Krystell Padilla Martin in 2017.

Gómez Fernández has two children, Roberto Gómez Bolívar and Tamara Gómez Bolívar, from his first marriage to Kim Bolívar.

== Filmography ==
Executive Producer, Programs, Scene Director
Year	Title	Notes
1985-86	María de nadie	Scene Director
1991	Milagro y magia	Scene Director
1994	Operalia	Programs
1995	La Dueña	Scene Director
1996	Azul	Scene Director
1997	Alguna vez tendremos alas	Scene Director
1998-99	Ángela	Scene Director
2000	Locura de amor	Executive Producer
2000	No contaban con mi astucia	Programs
2001-02	El juego de la vida	Executive Producer
2003-04	Clap, el lugar de tus sueños	Executive Producer
2006–14	El Chavo Animado	Programs
2006-07	Amor mío (with Giselle González)	Executive Producer
2008-09	Alma de Hierro (with Giselle González)	Executive Producer
2010-11	Para Volver a Amar (with Giselle González)	Executive Producer
2012	Cachito de cielo (with Giselle González)	Executive Producer
2014	El color de la pasión	Executive Producer
2016	El hotel de los secretos	Executive Producer
2018	La jefa del campeón	Executive Producer

== Awards and nominations ==
=== Premios TVyNovelas ===
Year	Category	Telenovela	Result
2001	Best Comedy Program	Locura de amor	Nominated
2007	Best Comedy Program	Amor mío	Won
2008	Best Comedy Program	Amor mío	Nominated
2009	Best Telenovela	Alma de Hierro	Nominated
2011	Best Telenovela	Para Volver a Amar	Won
2015	Best Telenovela	El color de la pasion	Nominated

=== Premios People en Español ===
Year	Category	Telenovela	Result
2011	Best telenovela	Para Volver a Amar	Nominated

=== Premios ACE ===
Year	Category	Telenovela	Result
2011	Best Telenovela	Para Volver a Amar	Won

=== Premios Bravo ===
Year	Category	Telenovela	Result
2011	Best Telenovela	Para volver a amar	Won

=== Premios Mundo Latino ===
Year	Category	Telenovela	Result
2012	Best Telenovela	Cachito de Cielo	Won
