= Rosa María Bianchi =

Argentine-born Mexican actress

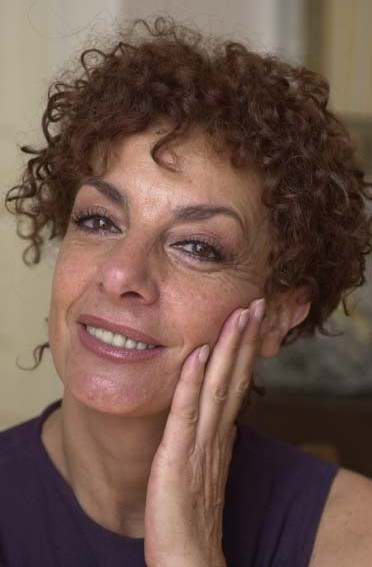
- Born: Rosa María Bianchi; February 18, 1948 (age 78); Buenos Aires, Argentina
- Occupation: Actress
- Years active: 1981–present
- Spouse: Luis de Tavira (Divorced)
- Children: José María (b. 1983); Julián

Rosa María Bianchi (born February 18, 1948, in Buenos Aires, Argentina) is an Argentine-born Mexican actress.

== Personal life ==
Bianchi was married to director of theater Luis de Tavira. They have two sons, José María (b. 1983) & Julián. She is also the aunt of Mexican actress Marina de Tavira.

== Filmography ==
=== Films ===
Year	Title	Role	Notes
1981	Hotel Villa Goerne	Unknown role	
1990	Pelo gallo	Unknown role	
1990	Ceremonia	Unknown role	Short film
1993	Miroslava	Sofía	
1996	Los vuelcos del corazón	Unknown role	
1997	Libre de culpas	Unknown role	
2000	Amores perros	Tía Luisa	
2000	Por la libre	Unknown role	
2003	Nicotina	Carmen	
2004	Las lloronas	Francisca	
2005	Sexo impostor	Unknown role	
2006	Fuera del cielo	Señora García Luna	
2006	Morirse en domingo	Laura	
2007	Sultanes	Mamá	
2011	Una pared para Cecilia	Unknown role	
2011	Los inadaptados	Carlota	
2013	Frente al espejo	Actress	Short film
2015	Redemption of a Broken Mind	Ana Villalonga	
2015	Sabrás qué hacer conmigo	Unknown role	
2016	Que pena tu vida	Patricia	

=== Television ===
Year	Title	Role	Notes
1986	Monte calvario	Esther	
1986	Cuna de lobos	Bertha Moscoso / Michelle Albán	
1988	El extraño retorno de Diana Salazar	Malena Salazar Obregón	
1989	Teresa	Rosa	
1990	Mi pequeña Soledad	Piedad	
1991	Vida robada	Irene	
1993	Sueño de amor	Unknown role	
1994–01	Mujer, casos de la vida real	Cuca	5 episodes
1995	Caminos cruzados	Alicia	
1996	Canción de amor	Alicia	
1997	Pueblo chico, infierno grande	Porfiria Cumbios	
1998	La mentira	Sara de Fernández-Negrete	
1999	Infierno en el paraíso	Dolores	
2000	Locura de amor	Clemencia Castañón	
2001	Mujer bonita	Carolina	
2001	Sin pecado concebido	Dr. Carmen Albán	
2001	Navidad sin fin	Josefina	
2002	La otra	Lupita Ibáñez	
2003–04	Alegrijes y rebujos	Helga Aguayo	
2005	Vecinos	Señora Olvera	"La pintura del edificio" (Season 1, Episode 2)
2005	Alborada	Esposa del Regidor	
2006–07	Amor mío	Maggie Casadiego	
2008–10	Mujeres asesinas	Sofía Capellán	39 episodes
2010	Gritos de muerte y libertad	Ignacia de Alamán	"Sangre que divide" (Season 1, Episode 4)
2011	La fuerza del destino	Lucrecía Curiel de Lomelí	
2014–15	Yo no creo en los hombres	Úrsula de la Vega	
2015	Yo no creo en los hombres, el origen	Úrsula de la Vega	Television film
2016	Yago	Melina López	
2018	José José, el príncipe de la canción	Margarita Ortiz	
2019-21	Monarca	Cecilia Dávila Viuda De Carranza	
2021	La suerte de Loli	Norita	Main cast
2022	Mujer de nadie	Gertrudis	Main cast
2024	Las Azules	Luz	
2025	Mi verdad oculta	Eloísa Arenas de Lizárraga	Main cast

== Awards and nominations ==
=== Premios Ariel ===
Year	Category	Film	Result
2004	Best Actress	Nicotina	Won

=== Premios TVyNovelas ===
Year	Category	Telenovela	Result
1987	Best Female Revelation	Cuna de lobos	Nominated
1991	Best Female Antagonist	Mi pequeña Soledad	Nominated
1992	Best Female Antagonist	Vida Robada	Nominated
1999	Best First Actress	La Mentira	Nominated
2015	Best First Actress	Yo no creo en los hombres	Won
