= Gabriel Soto =

Mexican actor and model (born 1975)

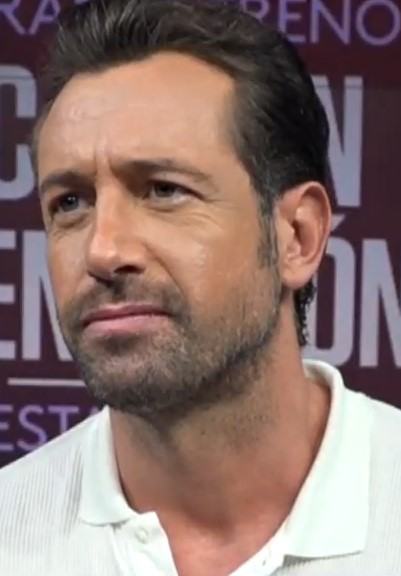
- Born: Gabriel Soto Borja Díaz; April 17, 1975 (age 51); Mexico City, Mexico
- Occupations: Actor and model
- Years active: 1996–present
- Title: Mr World Mexico 1996
- Spouse: Geraldine Bazán (m. 2016; div. 2018)
- Partner: Irina Baeva (2018–2024)
- Children: 2

Gabriel Soto Borja Díaz (born April 17, 1975) is a Mexican actor and model renowned for his extensive career in telenovelas and modeling competitions.

== Career ==
Soto began his modeling career at age 18 and achieved international recognition as the first runner-up in the Mister World 1996 contest held in Istanbul, Turkey. In 1997, he briefly joined the Mexican boy band Kairo, replacing member Eduardo Verástegui, before transitioning to acting with his onscreen debut in the telenovela Mi querida Isabel.

Soto rose to prominence in the telenovela genre through lead roles in productions such as Amigas y rivales (2001), where he portrayed Ulises "El Feo" Barrientos a breakthrough character that launched his stardom and La verdad oculta (2006).

His notable works also include Las vías del amor (2002–2003), Bajo las riendas del amor (2007), Sortilegio (2009), La fuerza del destino (2011), Un refugio para el amor (2012), Yo no creo en los hombres (2014–2015), Caer en tentación (2017) as the complex Damián, Soltero con hijas (2019) as the joyful Nico, and more recent series like Mi camino es amarte (2022–2023) as Guillermo "Memo" Santos and Monteverde (2025) as Óscar León. In addition to television, Soto has appeared in films like La peor de mis bodas (2016) and Cofradía (2018), and he has ventured into theater and hosting.

== Personal life ==
Soto was married to actress Geraldine Bazán from 2016 to 2018, with whom he shares two daughters, Elisa Marie and Alexa Miranda. He later entered a relationship with actress Irina Baeva, culminating in a spiritual wedding in March 2024 before their separation in July 2024.

== Filmography ==
=== Television ===
Year	Title	Role	Notes
1996	Mi querida Isabel	Juan	
1998–2007	Mujer, casos de la vida real	Various roles	20 episodes
1999	Alma rebelde	Vladimir Montenegro	
2000	Mi destino eres tú	Nicolás Landa	5 episodes
2000–2001	Carita de ángel	Rogelio Alvarado Gamboa	58 episodes
2001	La hora pico	Himself / Various roles	Episode: "Guest: Gabriel Soto"
2001	Amigas y rivales	Ulises Barrientos "El Feo"	185 episodes
2002–2003	Las vías del amor	Adolfo Lascuráin / Nicolás Barragán	220 episodes
2004–2005	Mujer de madera	Carlos Gómez	205 episodes
2006	La verdad oculta	David Genovés Ordóñez	120 episodes
2007	Bajo las riendas del amor	Juan José Álvarez	150 episodes
2008	Querida enemiga	Alonso Ugarte Solano	110 episodes
2009	Sortilegio	Fernando Alanís	95 episodes
2011	La fuerza del destino	Camilo Galván	96 episodes
2012	Un refugio para el amor	Rodrigo Torreslanda	165 episodes
2013	Libre para amarte	Enrique del Pino	107 episodes
2014–2015	Yo no creo en los hombres	Maximiliano Bustamente	121 episodes
2015–2016	Antes muerta que Lichita	Santiago de la Vega	43 episodes
2016–2017	Vino el amor	David Robles	141 episodes
2017	Nosotros los guapos	Claudio	Episode: "La estética"
2017–2018	Caer en tentación	Damián Becker	102 episodes
2018–2019	Mi marido tiene más familia	Ernesto "Neto" Rey	167 episodes
2019	Vecinos	Pietro Massomi	Episode: "Primera cita"
2019	Cita a ciegas	Alfredo Obando	8 episodes
2019–2020	Soltero con hijas	Nicolás Contreras	87 episodes
2021	Te acuerdas de mí	Pedro Cáceres	76 episodes
2022	Amor dividido	Max Stewart	107 episodes
2022–2023	Mi camino es amarte	Guillermo "Memo" Santos	92 episodes
2023	Vencer la culpa	Leandro Govea	
2025	Monteverde	Oscar León	Main role
2025	¿Quién es la máscara?	Carro Ñero	Season 7 runner-up
2026	Corazón de oro	Miguel Ángel	Main role
2027	Todavía te amo	Francisco	

== Awards and nominations ==
=== Premios TVyNovelas ===
Year	Nominated work	Category	Result	Ref
2013	Un refugio para el amor	TVyNovelas Award for Best Actor	Nominated	
2013	Un refugio para el amor	Audience's Favorites: Favorite Couple (Shared with Zuria Vega)	Won	
2013	Un refugio para el amor	Audience's Favorites: Favorite Kiss (Shared with Zuria Vega)	Won	
2015	Yo no creo en los hombres	TVyNovelas Award for Best Actor	Nominated	
2015	Yo no creo en los hombres	Audience's Favorites: Favorite Couple (Shared with Adriana Louvier)	Won	
2015	Yo no creo en los hombres	Audience's Favorites: Favorite Kiss (Shared with Adriana Louvier)	Won	
2018	Caer en tentación	TVyNovelas Award for Best Actor	Nominated	
2020	Soltero con hijas	TVyNovelas Award for Best Actor	Nominated	

=== Premios Juventud ===
Year	Nominated work	Category	Result	Ref
2022	Soltero con hijas	My Favorite Actor	Nominated	
2023	Mi camino es amarte	My Favorite Actor	Won	
2023	Soltero con hijas	My Favorite Actor	Won	
2024	Vencer la culpa	My Favorite Actor	Nominated	

Awards and achievements
Preceded by First	Mister World 1st Runner-up; 1996	Succeeded by (Puerto Rico) Germán Cardoso
Preceded by First	Mr World Mexico; 1996	Succeeded by Eduardo Rodríguez
