= Giselle González (producer) =

Mexican telenovela producer

- Born: Giselle González Salgado; May 31, 1969 (age 56); Mexico
- Occupation: Producer
- Years active: 1991-present

Giselle González Salgado (born May 31, 1969) is a Mexican television producer best known for her telenovela work.

== Filmography ==
Executive producer, associate producer, production manager, production assistant
Year	Title	Notes
1991	Alcanzar una estrella II	Production Assistant
1992	Baila conmigo	Production Manager
1996	La sombra del otro	Associate producer
1997-98	Huracán	Associate producer
2000	Locura de amor	Associate producer
2001-02	El juego de la vida	Associate producer
2003-04	Clap, el lugar de tus sueños	Associate producer
2006-08	Amor mío (with Roberto Gómez Fernández)	Executive producer
2008-09	Alma de Hierro (with Roberto Gómez Fernández)	Executive producer
2010-11	Para Volver a Amar (with Roberto Gómez Fernández)	Executive producer
2012	Cachito de cielo (with Roberto Gómez Fernández)	Executive producer
2014-15	Yo no creo en los hombres	Executive producer
2016-17	La candidata	Executive producer
2017-18	Caer en tentación	Executive producer
2019	Cuna de lobos	Executive producer
2020-21	Imperio de mentiras	Executive producer
2022	Mujer de nadie	Executive producer
2023	Senda prohibida	Executive producer
2024	Marea de pasiones	Executive producer

== Awards and nominations ==
=== Premios TVyNovelas ===
Year	Category	Telenovela	Result
2007	Best Comedy Program	Amor mío	Won
2008	Best Comedy Program	Amor mío	Nominated
2009	Best Telenovela of the Year	Alma de Hierro	Nominated
2011	Best Telenovela of the Year	Para Volver a Amar	Won
2015	Best Telenovela of the Year	Yo no creo en los hombres	Nominated
2017	Best Telenovela of the Year	La Candidata	Won
2018	Best Telenovela of the Year	Caer en tentación	Won

=== Premios Bravo ===
Year	Category	Telenovela	Result
2011	Best Telenovela	Para Volver a Amar	Won
2015	Best Telenovela	Yo no creo en los hombres	Won

=== Premios Mundo Latino ===
Year	Category	Telenovela	Result
2012	Best Telenovela	Cachito de cielo	Won
