= Tal para cual (TV series) =

- Genre: Sitcom
- Written by: César González; Alfonso Villalpando; Gustavo Munguía; Reynaldo López
- Directed by: Sergio Adrián Sánchez
- Starring: Consuelo Duval; Lorena de la Garza
- Theme music composer: Gustavo Munguía; César González; Carlos Muñoz
- Opening theme: "Tal para cual" by Consuelo Duval & Lorena de la Garza
- Composer: Carlos Muñoz
- Country of origin: Mexico
- Original language: Spanish
- No. of seasons: 4
- No. of episodes: 57

Production
- Executive producer: Reynaldo López
- Producers: Dulce López; César González
- Production company: TelevisaUnivision

Original release
- Network: Las Estrellas
- Release: 13 October 2022 – present

Related
- La hora pico; Nosotros los guapos

Tal para cual is a Mexican sitcom series and a spin-off of the series La hora pico. The series is produced by Reynaldo López for TelevisaUnivision. The series follows the lives of Nacaranda (Consuelo Duval) and Nacasia (Lorena de la Garza). The series premiered on Las Estrellas on 13 October 2022. In January 2025, the series was renewed for a fourth season that premiered on 1 June 2025.

== Cast ==
=== Main ===
- Consuelo Duval as Nacaranda
- Lorena de la Garza as Nacasia
- Reynaldo Rossano as Nacolás
- Gustavo Munguía as Molusco / Paul Yéster
- Javier Carranza as Nacosteño
- Hugo Alcántara as El Indio Brayan
- Nicole Vale as Nacol
- David Salomón as Hétor
- Maribel Fernández as Nacorita
- Lupita Sandoval as Panchita (guest, season 1; main, seasons 2–3)

=== Guest stars ===
- Gabriel Soto as Ricardo Fernando Lascuraín
- Ricardo Fastlicht as Judge
- Emmanuel Palomares as Dónovan
- Paul Stanley as El Patotas
- Claudio Herrera as Police officer
- Roberto Tello as Blanket salesman
- Alfredo Adame as himself
- José Eduardo Derbez as Tatu
- Carlos Trejo as himself
- José Luis Cordero as Albino
- David Villapaldo as the Prosecutor
- María Elena Saldaña as Vidente Fernández
- Carlos Bonavides as Diógenes Cacho
- Ferdinando Valencia as Félix Calvo
- Arturo García Tenorio as Don Justo
- Gabriel Varela
- Herson Andrade
- Agustín Arana as Paco Gertz
- Yurem
- Tamara Henaine
- Michelle Rodríguez as Toña
- Armando Hernández as Brayan Dannielle
- Jorge van Rankin as Paco
- Edwin Luna as himself
- Ulises de la Torre as Mr. Tafolla
- Juan Antonio Edwards as the Inspector
- Pepe Magaña as Mr. Carcamo
- Michel López
- Erika Buenfil as Mrs. Corcuera
- Edson Zúñiga
- Ariel Miramontes as Albertano Santacruz
- Eduardo España as Margara Francisca (season 1) / Tommy Camote (season 2)
- José Elías Moreno
- Cynthia Urías as herself
- Sergio DeFassio
- Arath de la Torre
- Arturo Carmona
- Jesús Ochoa
- Lucila Mariscal
- Luis de Alba
- Sergio Mayer
- Mane de la Parra as Memo
- Roberto Palazuelos
- Humberto Elizondo
- Raúl Araiza
- Manuel "Flaco" Ibáñez
- Alejandro Suárez as Don Remigio
- Raúl Coronado
- Freddy Ortega as Frank
- Germán Ortega as Igor
- Adrián Uribe as El Vítor
- Eduardo Yáñez
- Ricardo Margaleff
- Roxana Castellanos
- Yuliana Peniche
- Bobo El Payaso

== Episodes ==
Series	Episodes	Originally released	
Series	Episodes	First released	Last released
1	12	13 October 2022	29 December 2022
2	15	20 August 2023	24 September 2023
3	15	25 February 2024	24 March 2024
4	15	1 June 2025	4 January 2026

=== Season 1 (2022) ===
No. overall	No. in season	Title	Original release date	Mexico viewers (millions)
1	1	"La boda de Nacaranda"	13 October 2022	1.6
2	2	"El perfume"	20 October 2022	1.6
3	3	"No jalen que descobijan"	27 October 2022	1.7
4	4	"El tatuaje fantasma"	3 November 2022	1.4
5	5	"Nacaranda... yo soy tu padre"	10 November 2022	1.6
6	6	"El tiro por la culata"	17 November 2022	1.6
7	7	"Estrella por un día"	24 November 2022	1.4
8	8	"Juntos pero no revueltos"	1 December 2022	1.7
9	9	"El que tenga tienda que la atienda"	8 December 2022	1.9
10	10	"Los golpes de la vida"	15 December 2022	1.7
11	11	"Es tu perro y tú lo bañas"	22 December 2022	1.3
12	12	"Corazón de vecindad"	29 December 2022	2.1

=== Season 2 (2023) ===
No. overall	No. in season	Title	Original release date	Mexico viewers (millions)
13	1	"El empapadas"	20 August 2023	1.5
14	2	"Superhéroe"	20 August 2023	1.5
15	3	"La herencia"	20 August 2023	1.5
16	4	"El billete"	27 August 2023	1.5
17	5	"El rey del disfraz"	27 August 2023	1.5
18	6	"El cantante en bruto"	27 August 2023	1.5
19	7	"El Hipnotista"	3 September 2023	1.9
20	8	"Coach de vida"	3 September 2023	1.9
21	9	"El rey del sabor"	10 September 2023	1.6
22	10	"El tío Aristeo"	10 September 2023	1.6
23	11	"Cocina de barrio"	10 September 2023	1.6
24	12	"El abuelo Don Remigio"	17 September 2023	1.6
25	13	"El mago de tos"	17 September 2023	1.6
26	14	"La criatura que destruirá al mundo"	17 September 2023	1.6
27	15	"Hasta que se me hizo"	24 September 2023	1.5

=== Season 3 (2024) ===
No. overall	No. in season	Title	Original release date	Mexico viewers (millions)
28	1	"Supersticiones"	25 February 2024	1.64
29	2	"El greñas locas"	25 February 2024	1.64
30	3	"De subida y de bajada"	25 February 2024	1.64
31	4	"Apantallados del cine nacional"	3 March 2024	1.95
32	5	"Mi niña"	3 March 2024	1.95
33	6	"El sol sale para todos"	3 March 2024	1.95
34	7	"Nacasia no está, Nacasia se fue"	10 March 2024	1.55
35	8	"Las Planiabodas"	10 March 2024	1.55
36	9	"La Geniuda"	10 March 2024	1.55
37	10	"Nuevos Inquilinos"	17 March 2024	1.34
38	11	"Clases de Historia"	17 March 2024	1.34
39	12	"La Vampira Sangrienta"	17 March 2024	1.34
40	13	"La eterna juventud"	24 March 2024	1.40
41	14	"Sueños guajiros"	24 March 2024	1.40
42	15	"Las estatuas de marfil"	24 March 2024	1.40

=== Season 4 (2025–26) ===
No. overall	No. in season	Title	Original release date (Note: All fifteen episodes of the fourth season were released on Vix on 23 May 2025, ahead of its weekly Las Estrellas premieres.)	Mexico viewers (millions)
43	1	"El hijo de Nacolás"	1 June 2025	2.17
44	2	"Cuatachas por siempre"	8 June 2025	2.37
45	3	"El abuelo"	15 June 2025	1.73
46	4	"No hagas olas"	29 June 2025	1.98
47	5	"La terapia de Paul"	6 July 2025	2.02
48	6	"Garnacha mata taco"	13 July 2025	1.89
49	7	"Hétor el influencer"	20 July 2025	1.65
50	8	"Bebé suelto"	27 July 2025	1.73
51	9	"El bulto de Nacolás"	3 August 2025	1.85
52	10	"La prima chupitos"	10 August 2025	1.70
53	11	"Re-destruyendo Nacotitán"	17 August 2025	1.85
54	12	"No te la halloween"	24 August 2025	1.96
55	13	"Sí sí mamá"	31 August 2025	1.89
56	14	"La pastorela"	7 September 2025	1.77
57	15	"Especial de Navidad"	4 January 2026	2.04

== Production ==
In March 2022, producer Reynaldo López confirmed in that he was developing a spin-off of sketch show La hora pico, that centered around the characters of Nacaranda and Nacasia from the sketch Las Nacas. Filming of the series began in May 2022. On 15 September 2022, it was announced that the series would premiere on 13 October 2022. On 20 December 2022, it was announced that the series was renewed for a second season. Filming of the second season began on 15 May 2023 and concluded on 23 June 2023. The season premiered on 20 August 2023. Filming of the third season began on 30 October 2023. The third season premiered on 25 February 2024. Filming of the fourth season began on 13 January 2025. The fourth season premiered on 1 June 2025.

== Ratings ==
Viewership and ratings per season of Tal para cual
Season	Timeslot (CT)	Episodes	First aired		Last aired		Avg. viewers (millions)
Season	Timeslot (CT)	Episodes	Date	Viewers (millions)	Date	Viewers (millions)	Avg. viewers (millions)
1	Thursday 11:00 pm	12	13 October 2022	1.60	29 December 2022	2.10	1.63
2	Sunday 7:30 pm	15	20 August 2023	1.50	24 September 2023	1.50	1.60
3	Sunday 7:30 pm	15	25 February 2024	1.64	24 March 2024	1.40	1.58
4	Sunday 7:30 pm	15	1 June 2025	2.17	4 January 2026	2.04	1.91
