= List of 40 y 20 episodes =

40 y 20 is a Mexican sitcom produced by Gustavo Loza for Televisa.

As of April 9, 2025, 148 episodes of 40 y 20 have aired, concluding the twelfth season.

== Series overview ==
Season	Episodes	Originally released		
Season	Episodes	First released	Last released	Network
1	13	April 1, 2016		Blim TV
2	13	December 2, 2016		Blim TV
3	13	August 28, 2017	November 6, 2017	Blim TV
4	13	September 16, 2018	November 25, 2018	Blim TV
5	12	November 20, 2020	December 24, 2020	Las Estrellas
6	12	April 13, 2021	June 29, 2021	Las Estrellas
7	12	September 28, 2021	December 14, 2021	Las Estrellas
8	12	April 26, 2022	July 19, 2022	Las Estrellas
9	12	October 11, 2022	December 27, 2022	Las Estrellas
10	12	October 3, 2023	December 19, 2023	Las Estrellas
11	12	October 3, 2024	December 26, 2024	Las Estrellas
12	12	April 1, 2025	April 9, 2025	Canal 5

== Episodes ==
=== Season 1 (2016) ===
No. overall	No. in season	Title	Original release date
1	1	"Bed and breakfast"	April 1, 2016
The weekend has come and Fran is going to stay at his father's house, Paco already has a plan to go out with his girlfriend Miranda, so Fran takes advantage and invites her friend Lola to sleep. The next morning everyone comes for breakfast. Guest stars: Begoña Narváez as Miranda, Jessica Mas as Lola, Luis Gatica as Víctor
2	2	"El ratón de Rocío"	April 1, 2016
Paco spends a great weekend next to his son Fran and his girlfriend Miranda, until Rocío his ex-wife arrives to stay with them, since a mouse has been sent to her house. Guest stars: Begoña Narváez as Miranda, Luis Gatica as Víctor
3	3	"Las clases de regularización"	April 1, 2016
Fran is doing poorly in school and needs some regularization classes, so the weekend that he stays at his father's house, takes advantage to take a little class in his room and a spectacular teacher. Guest stars: Begoña Narváez as Miranda, María Aura as Margarita, Fidel Zerda as Manuel
4	4	"El pan francés"	April 1, 2016
Fran goes camping and Paco wants to spend a romantic weekend with Miranda, but she has other plans, a French friend has arrived in Mexico and has invited him to stay in the apartment. Guest stars: Begoña Narváez as Miranda, Oswaldo Zárate as Borrego, Eivaut Rischen as Pascal, Pascacio López as Jair Gabriel
5	5	"El cumple de Miranda"	April 1, 2016
It's Miranda's birthday and they go out to party, as the night goes by, Paco feels bad and leaves her there. The next morning Miranda appears in the door drunk and with a very peculiar aroma. Guest stars: Begoña Narváez as Miranda, Jessica Mas as Lola, Natalia Téllez as Montserrat, Oswaldo Zárate as Borrego
6	6	"Miss pesadilla"	April 1, 2016
Fran's regular teacher shows up surprisingly in the apartment, only carrying a suitcase and a child. Guest stars: María Aura as Margarita, Fidel Zerda as Manuel, Patricio de la Garza as Manuelito, Begoña Narváez as Miranda
7	7	"Un rudo amanecer"	April 1, 2016
Paco is depressed because he ended his relationship with Miranda. Rocío comes to visit to collect a check, one thing leads to the other and she ends up a little drunk The next morning Fran finds something disconcerting.
8	8	"No hace falta"	April 1, 2016
Fran asks his dad why he divorced his mother, he tells his version of the story, corrected and increased and even Mijares, the famous singer comes out muddy. Guest stars: Ignacio Guadalupe as Don Chilo, Manuel Mijares as himself
9	9	"A la vista Do Brasil"	April 1, 2016
Fran and her friend have planned to bring a student exchange home, but Paco flatly refuses to receive her, until he sees Bruna. Guest stars: Natalia Téllez as Montserrat, Estephanie Almeida as Bruna, Oswaldo Zárate as Borrego
10	10	"La hermana incómoda"	April 1, 2016
Paco has a new girlfriend, Montse and for their first weekend together, she takes her sister Vero, who is very depressed because she ended her relationship with her boyfriend. Guest stars: Natalia Téllez as Montserrat, Thanya López as Vero
11	11	"¿Quién está en Barcelona?"	April 1, 2016
Paco discovers a pregnancy test in the trash can. He thinks it belongs to Lola, Montse, or Toña. Guest stars: Natalia Téllez as Montserrat, Jessica Mas as Lola, Thanya López as Vero
12	12	"La ex de Paco"	April 1, 2016
Paco is again single and very depressed, so Fran suggests to find a new girlfriend online. Paco is very surprised to enter a site and see the photo of Maribel, an old love. Guest stars: Eugenia Cauduro as Maribel Malpica, Armando Hernández as Brayan Dannielle
13	13	"La amante de lo ajeno"	April 1, 2016
Fran resorts to one of his cell phone apps to meet a new friend and invite her to sleep at his dad's house. A few hours later Xóchitl arrives, a young woman of spectacular body and of dubious origin. Guest stars: Fabiola Guajardo as Xóchitl

=== Season 2 (2016) ===
No. overall	No. in season	Title	Original release date
14	1	"La mudanza"	December 2, 2016
Paco is very depressed by the robbery to his apartment and asks Rocío to borrow her furniture. New neighbors have arrived to the building and Fran is trapped in the elevator with one of them. Guest stars: Armando Hernández as Brayan Dannielle, Estefanía Ahumada Lama as Macarena, Natalia Varela as Marijo
15	2	"De lo perdido, lo recuperado"	December 2, 2016
Paco recovers the furniture of his house, but Toña is inconsolable because her perfume brought from Oaxaca does not appear. Guest stars: Luis Gatica as Víctor, Armando Hernández as Brayan Dannielle, Estefanía Ahumada Lama as Macarena, Natalia Varela as Marijo, Ricardo de Pascual as Don Solobino, Sophie Alexander as Laura, Reynaldo Rossano as Boby
16	3	"La nueva cuñada"	December 2, 2016
Fofo, the brother of Paco has arrived to visit Mexico, without wife and with a singular couple. Guest stars: Estefanía Ahumada Lama as Macarena, Natalia Varela as Marijo, Mauricio Isaac as Rodolfo, Ricardo Martínez Polanco as Alessandro
17	4	"La despedida de soltera"	December 2, 2016
Macarena is about to get married and has nowhere to make her bachelorette party, so Paco very kindly offers his department for the celebration. Guest stars: Estefanía Ahumada Lama as Macarena, Natalia Varela as Marijo, Coral Bonelli as Coral, Oswaldo Zárate as Borrego
18	5	"La junta de vecinos"	December 2, 2016
After the bachelorette party, Paco's neighbors are very upset, so they want to evict him from the building. Guest stars: Estefanía Ahumada Lama as Macarena, Natalia Varela as Marijo, Marta Zamora as Ruperta, Ricardo de Pascual as Don Solobino, Sophie Alexander as Laura, Oswaldo Zárate as Borrego, Reynaldo Rossano as Boby
19	6	"Salvando al soldado Pedro"	December 2, 2016
Pedro, Paco's best friend is about to lose his marriage for cheating on his wife. Paco could save his life. Guest stars: Oswaldo Zárate as Borrego, Raúl Araiza as Pedro, Vivian Serna as Martha, Mayrín Villanueva as Ximena, Estefanía Ahumada Lama as Macarena
20	7	"Toña no está"	December 2, 2016
Toña has left the house and Brayan Danielle has recommended her aunt, Doña Lucha, to help out with house chores. Guest stars: Mara Escalante as Doña Lucha
21	8	"Se renta departamento"	December 2, 2016
Paco goes on a trip and Fran finds the perfect opportunity to earn a few dollars, he rents his dad's apartment to some elderly people for the weekend, a few hours later Paco's flight is canceled. Guest stars: Roger Cudney as Arnold, Jeanne Donnadieu as Kate, Ricardo Velderrain as Ramón, Estefanía Ahumada Lama as Macarena, Natalia Varela as Marijo, Oswaldo Zárate as Borrego
22	9	"Amor express cortado"	December 2, 2016
Fran has just met Karime and falls madly in love with her, only that there is a small problem, Karime is getting married next weekend. Guest stars: Itahisa Machado as Karime
23	10	"La boda de Karime"	December 2, 2016
Paco accompanies Fran to the wedding of Karime and there he meets Emilia, a former student who failed at the university. Guest stars: Itahisa Machado as Karime, Karla Sofía Gascón as Óscar, Regina Rojas as Emilia, Mariana Carvajal as Susana, Pascacio López as Jair Gabriel
24	11	"Un maestro en apuros"	December 2, 2016
Paco is fired from the university because of the scandal that has been generated by Emilia and all his women claim him. Guest stars: Regina Rojas as Emilia, Mariana Carvajal as Susana
25	12	"La terapia de Fran"	December 2, 2016
Rocío has decided to take his son Fran to therapy, but surprisingly she learns that he loves older women. Guest stars: Montserrat Oliver as Silvana, Begoña Narváez as Miranda, Armando Hernández as Brayan Dannielle
26	13	"No me importa que me digan mujeriego"	December 2, 2016
Paco returns with his ex-girlfriend Miranda and takes her to live in his house, everything is going well, until Lorena arrives and the world collapses. Guest stars: Natalia Téllez as Montserrat, Armando Hernández as Brayan Dannielle, Estefanía Ahumada Lama as Macarena, Natalia Varela as Marijo, Regina Rojas as Emilia, Mariana Carvajal as Susana, Coral Bonelli as Coral, Itahisa Machado as Karime, Begoña Narváez as Miranda, Esmeralda Pimentel as Lorena, Pascacio López as Jair Gabriel, Sophie Alexander as Laura

=== Season 3 (2017) ===
No. overall	No. in season	Title	Original release date
27	1	"Fake News"	August 28, 2017
Lorena, Paco's pretty lover, wants to blackmail him with a false pregnancy. Paco enters in crisis, returns to take and bottoms. Guest Stars: Mónica Huarte as Rocío, Esmeralda Pimentel as Lorena, Begoña Narváez as Miranda, Pascacio López as Jair Gabriel, Ramón Medina as Killer, Jessica Ortiz as La ninfómana, Andrés Delgado as El enfermo sexual, Miguel Pizarro as El psicólogo
28	2	"Paco está de vuelta"	August 28, 2017
Paco organizes a party to celebrate his singleness; the next morning dawns with Lauris the neighbor, who takes the adventure very seriously, to the degree of bringing her parents to meet her future husband. Guest Stars: Pascacio López as Jair Gabriel, Oswaldo Zárate as Borrego, Sophie Alexander as Laura, Jessica Mas as Lola, Raquel Pankowsky as Doña Magdalena, Salvador Sánchez as Don Doroteo, Coral Bonelli as Coral
29	3	"La crisis de los cuarenta"	August 28, 2017
Rocío goes into depression because she is abandoned by Victor, her boyfriend. She asks Paco for help, who sponsors a trip to India to find herself again. Guest Stars: Mónica Huarte as Rocío, Begoña Narváez as Miranda, Pascacio López as Jair Gabriel
30	4	"Hola delgada"	September 11, 2017
Rosario, the ex-sister in law of Paco, takes the administration of the building, puts everyone in trouble by setting very strict and severe rules. Guest Stars: Begoña Narváez as Miranda, Pascacio López as Jair Gabriel, Oswaldo Zárate as Borrego, Gerardo Taracena as Macedonio
31	5	"Las elecciones"	September 11, 2017
Fed up with Rosario, Paco organizes a neighborhood election to change the administration of the building. The candidates are Rosario, Paco, and Toña, the representative of town. Guest Stars: Sophie Alexander as Laura, Paola Galina as Ana María
32	6	"Súper fit"	September 11, 2017
Paco joins a gym and meets Lety, a beautiful fitness instructor, who is vegan. He agrees to a rigorous diet and exercises that are killing him. Guest Stars: Verónica Montes as Lety
33	7	"El club de los 33"	September 25, 2017
Fran has an affair with a lady, whom he meets in the supermarket. Meanwhile, Paco receives the unexpected visit of a Russian stewardess with whom he entered the Club of 33 Thousand Feet. Guest Stars: Begoña Narváez as Miranda, María Rebeca as Estrella, Irina Baeva as Masha, Gabriel Anguiano as Niño cerillo
34	8	"Hasta la victoria siempre"	October 16, 2017
Fran returns from his generation trip with a story, he got married in Havana with Yusnavis, a spectacular Cuban, whom he has brought to live in Mexico. Guest Stars: Oswaldo Zárate as Borrego, Mar Zamora as Yusnavis, Alex Rosguer as Maikel
35	9	"La chavita bien"	October 27, 2017
Paco returns to give architecture classes and meets Mónica, a beautiful student with whom he initiates a romance, this one is interrupted when in the apartment appears Samuel, the father of Mónica. Guest Stars: Juan Pablo Medina as Don Hilario, Ela Velden as Mónica
36	10	"XV años en cada pata"	October 27, 2017
Toña says that her parents never gave her a quinceañera. After a long debate, Rosario presses Paco to sponsor the late quinceañera celebration of Toña. Guest Stars: Oswaldo Zárate as Borrego, Laura Carmine as Carola, Gerardo Taracena as Macedonio
37	11	"Los XV años de Toña"	October 27, 2017
After a long planning comes the day of the celebration of the quinceañera of Toña; what at first starts as a traditional and emotional party, ends in a true pandemonium. Guest Stars: Oswaldo Zárate as Borrego, Pascacio López as Jair Gabriel, Gerardo Taracena as Macedonio, Coral Bonelli as Coral
38	12	"Hollywood en casa"	November 6, 2017
Paco threatens to spend the weekend outside of Mexico, so Fran and El Borrego rent the apartment for the filming of a movie. Guest Stars: Ariadne Díaz as Jennifer Bracamontes, Marcus Ornellas as Gálan Jennifer, Lorenzo Davis as Joan Ramón, Oswaldo Zárate as Borrego, Gerardo Taracena as Macedonio
39	13	"Modelo vintage"	November 6, 2017
Fran meets Sheyla in Tinder, an attractive and mature "vintage actress", whom he invites to dinner at the apartment. When she arrives, he meets a woman much older than him, but it's too late. Guest Stars: Wanda Seux as Sheyla, Pascacio López as Jair Gabriel, Gerardo Taracena as Macedonio

=== Season 4 (2018) ===
No. overall	No. in season	Title	Written by	Original release date
40	1	"El ave fénix"	Raúl Olivares & Gustavo Loza	September 16, 2018
Paco and Toña are in serious problems. They do not know what to do with Sheyla's body, that appeared dead on the sofa of the house. Guest stars: Wanda Seux as Sheyla, Oswaldo Zárate as Borrego, Gerardo Taracena as Macedonio, Roberto Tello as Ministerio Público, Rubén Branco as Perito, Martha Zamora as Ruperta
41	2	"Hoy por mí, mañana por ti"	Gustavo Loza & Elías Marín Govea	September 16, 2018
Beto, Paco's cousin, arrives at the apartment asking for to stay, since his wife, Julia, caught him in making a move and made him leave his house. Guest stars Roberto Palazuelos as Beto, Macarena Miguel as Cris, Irán Castillo as Julia
42	3	"Corregido y aumentado"	Mary Carmen Ramírez	September 16, 2018
Beto is a charming slob. Paco and Fran warn Toña that Beto is cheating on her. But she thinks they say that because they're jealous. Guest stars Roberto Palazuelos as Beto, Juan Pablo Medina as Samuel, Macarena Miguel as Cris, Ela Velden as Mónica, Irán Castillo as Julia
43	4	"Ya nos cayó el chahuiscle"	Mary Carmen Ramírez	September 23, 2018
Toña’s family arrives and as she told them something different from the reality, Paco has to pretend to be her boyfriend and Fran plays the role of butler. Guest stars: Fernando Manzano as Toña’s father, Claudia Bollat as Toña’s mother, José Emilio Avila as José Guadalupe, Martha Zavaleta as Toña’s grandmother, Dunia Alexandra as Wendy Yaneth
44	5	"El mundo hecho pelotas"	Gustavo Loza & Elías Marín Govea	September 30, 2018
Paco arrives at the apartment with Meche, a friend, and she proposes to go to a massive nude in the pyramids of Teotihuacan, for some photos. She promises that it is a unique experience. But Toña is the only one who is not encouraged. Guest stars: Gina Holguin as Meche, Oswaldo Zárate as Borrego
45	6	"Durmiendo con el enemiguito"	Fercho Nolla & Gustavo Loza	October 7, 2018
Paco's nephew, Jacobito, comes to spend a few days with them, since he is on vacation. But he does not let Paco be alone with his girlfriend Mayra, and he even sleeps with them. Guest stars: Livia Brito as Mayra, Paco de la Fuente as Jacobito, Gina Pedret as Jacobito's mother
46	7	"Con las manos en la masa"	Gustavo Loza	October 14, 2018
Paco arrives scared at home with his friend Cassandra and tells Toña and Fran that the bank where he made a deposit was assaulted. But it turns out that Cassandra is the assailant. Guest stars: Scarlet Dergal as Cassandra, Juan Manuel Pavón as Policía
47	8	"El león no es como lo pintan"	Alfredo Ballesteros	October 21, 2018
Fran brings a new girlfriend to the apartment, Tatiana, an airplane pilot who knows how to fix a television and likes soccer. But Toña puts in Paco's head that the girl is a man and he, astonished, asks her not to leave them alone. Guest stars: Diana Lein as Tatiana, Luis Carlos Villareal as Lisa
48	9	"Peinando a la muñeca"	Adrián Zurita	October 28, 2018
Weird things happen in the Cossio home and everything indicates that the culprit is an old doll. Paco and Fran talk to their friends about what is happening that has them so scared. Guest stars: Sergio DeFassio as Padre Camilo, Michelle Olvera as Fran's Friend, Natalia Téllez as Montserrat, Ivánna Hernández as Niña
49	10	"El regreso de Chio"	Gustavo Loza & Raúl Olivares	November 4, 2018
After a night of partying, Fran's mother comes to visit, but he almost does not recognize her because of how changed she is. She went to a retreat in India and now uses a backpack and has dreadlocks. She asks them to let her spend a few days with them. Guest stars: Mónica Huarte as Rocío, Natalia Téllez as Montserrat, Pedro Pietro as Nayat
50	11	"Adiós al Tíbet"	Mary Carmen Ramírez	November 11, 2018
Rocío's boyfriend left her and she is desperate. But Fran puts order and scolds his parents, sends his mom to take a shower and tells Paco not to drink alcohol again. Guest stars: Mónica Huarte as Rocío, Fede Farrell as Galán, Carlos Segura as Mesero
51	12	"La millennial y el chavuorucco"	Unknown	November 18, 2018
Paco gets upset with Renata, the famous Youtuber known as Rex, with whom he is going out with, because she uploaded videos of him to social networks and the comments that people make are not very to his liking. Guest stars: Bárbara Islas as Renata, Oswaldo Zárate as Borrego
52	13	"Las groupies"	Mary Carmen Ramírez & Gustavo Loza	November 25, 2018
Beto comes to visit with four tickets for a concert and Paco must get someone to go with. Guest stars: Roberto Palazuelos as Beto, Begoña Narváez as Miranda, Armando Hernández as Brayan Dannielle, Joaquín Ferreira as Cantante, Paola Galina as Ana María, Bárbara Islas as Renata, Edna Monroy as Manager, Alfred Morais as Músico, Lucca Osses as Músico

=== Season 5 (2020) ===
No. overall	No. in season	Title	Written by	Original release date	Viewers (millions)
53	1	"Ni me digan que me regreso"	Gustavo Loza	November 20, 2020	1.9
Paco fires Toña and he, along with Beto, Fran and Brayan Danielle will do a casting to choose the woman who can replace her, but Toña could return with a well-deserved increase in salary. Guest stars: Roberto Palazuelos as Beto, Armando Hernández as Brayan Dannielle, Sophie Alexander as Laura, Giovanna Romo as Michelle
54	2	"Pool party"	Jacobo Vázquez Abén	November 26, 2020	1.6
Beto goes to live in Paco's building and proposes to build a pool. Horcasitas is convinced until she meets Fran, whom she exploits in order to give permission for their project. Guest stars: Roberto Palazuelos as Beto, Begoña Narváez as Miranda, Armando Hernández as Brayan Dannielle, Oswaldo Zárate as Borrego, Michelle González as Lic. Horcasitas, Lily Maja as Vielka
55	3	"Cómo no te voy a querer"	Adrián Zurita	November 27, 2020	1.5
Fran invites Luciana to the apartment, but she will not go alone. He must sacrifice himself as long as he spends more time with her. Guest stars: Mariana D'Angelo as Luciana, Lautaro Ibars as Matías, Begoña Narváez as Miranda
56	4	"De tal palo"	Mary Carmen Ramírez	December 3, 2020	N/A
Paco's father plans to stay and live with his son and grandson, but to please him is impossible, so Paco asks his mother for help, but she makes it a condition that his father apologizes to her. Guest stars: Nuria Bages as Doña Gloria, Manuel "Flaco" Ibáñez as Don Francisco
57	5	"Hable ahora o calle para siempre"	Miguel Necoechea Chávez	December 4, 2020	1.5
Toña and Fran receive the invitation to Miranda's wedding and Paco will suffer from the news, but in the end he will do everything not to lose his love. Guest stars: Armando Hernández as Brayan Dannielle, Begoña Narváez as Miranda, Oswaldo Zárate as Borrego, Jessica Mas as Lola, Irving Peña as Juan Carlos, Alex Marín as El Padre
58	6	"Terapia de pareja"	Luciana Silveyra	December 8, 2020	N/A
Paco and Miranda decide to go to couples therapy to finally achieve a healthy and stable relationship, but the therapist Sylvana Mora is only interested in Fran. Guest stars: Armando Hernández as Brayan Dannielle, Begoña Narváez as Miranda, Montserrat Oliver as Silvana Mora
59	7	"Llámame Francisco"	Luciana Silveyra & Gustavo Loza	December 10, 2020	N/A
After being drunk with Miranda, Paco falls, hitting his head tremendously. When he wakes up he seems to be someone else. Guest stars: Begoña Narváez as Miranda, Armando Hernández as Brayan Dannielle, Oswaldo Zárate as Borrego, Christian Uribe as The Doctor
60	8	"Más vale mala por conocida"	Mary Carmen Ramírez	December 15, 2020	1.2
Josefa is the Spanish woman who will try to conquer Paco, even over Miranda, and who will surprise everyone by discovering her true intentions. Guest stars: Begoña Narváez as Miranda, Armando Hernández as Brayan Dannielle, Oswaldo Zárate as Borrego, Candela Márquez as Josefa
61	9	"Comida Degeneración"	Jacobo Vázquez Abén & Gustavo Loza	December 17, 2020	1.5
Seeing the high school yearbook, Paco and Beto decide to meet up with some of their former classmates, so they will have a party in the apartment. Guest stars: Roberto Palazuelos as Beto, Luciana Silveyra as Zussi, Carlos Espejel as Sanabria,
62	10	"El Premio Gordo"	Adrián Zurita	December 18, 2020	1.7
Brayan Daniel discovers that he has won the lottery and with the money he plans to carry out many dreams and plans. Guest stars: Armando Hernández as Brayan Dannielle, Oswaldo Zárate as Borrego, Enrique Arreola as Lic. Zamarripa
63	11	"El Cumpleaños de Rocío"	Miguel Necoechea Chávez & Gustavo Loza	December 22, 2020	1.3
A party is organized for Paco to forget about Miranda, but when Rocío arrives she mistakes it for a surprise party for her for her birthday, which everyone ends up celebrating in their own way. Guest stars: Armando Hernández as Brayan Dannielle, Oswaldo Zárate as Borrego, Jessica Mas as Lola, Nashla Aguilar as Mary, Santiago Ramundo as David
64	12	"Chío en Barcelona"	Miguel Necoechea Chávez & Gustavo Loza	December 24, 2020	N/A
After having spent the night together, Rocío arrives with the news that she and Paco will give Fran a little brother. Guest star: Begoña Narváez as Miranda

=== Season 6 (2021) ===
No. overall	No. in season	Title	Written by	Original release date	Viewers (millions)
65	1	"Reposo absoluto"	Mary Carmen Ramírez	April 13, 2021	1.6
Rocío moves to Paco's house because, according to her, she requires rest and care due to an alleged high-risk pregnancy. She takes advantage of this to exploit Paco, Fran and Toña and get her family back. Guest stars: Santiago Ramundo as David
66	2	"Clases de pintura"	Adrián Zurita	April 20, 2021	1.5
Fran finds his true calling in painting and enrolls in classes with an attractive teacher. He seems to be advancing fast and must hire a professional model who will be very expensive for Paco. Guest stars: Armando Hernández as Brayan Dannielle, Karla Gómez as Bety, Adriana Williams as Claudette
67	3	"A la prima no se le arrima"	Luciana Silveyra	April 27, 2021	1.5
Clementina, Toña's cousin, comes to live in the apartment. She is an all-seeing psychic and will use her gifts to solve everyone's life, hiding her true intentions. Guest stars: Begoña Narváez as Miranda, Armando Hernández as Brayan Dannielle, Oswaldo Zárate as Borrego, Elyfer Torres as Clementina
68	4	"Grandes en la derrota"	Mary Carmen Ramírez & Gustavo Loza	May 4, 2021	1.6
The result of the final between Cruz Azul and América will depress Paco, but his great friend Emilio will teach him a lesson. Guest stars: Begoña Narváez as Miranda, Armando Hernández as Brayan Dannielle, Oswaldo Zárate as Borrego, Emilio Azcarraga Jean as himself
69	5	"Amores que matan, nunca mueren"	Gustavo Loza	May 11, 2021	1.4
Melina, a former student of Paco, will arrive to confess that she got divorced because she is in love with him and wants them to start a family. Only a crazy idea from Toña can save him. Guest stars: Armando Hernández as Brayan Dannielle, Jade Fraser as Melina
70	6	"Rockero mata todo"	Jacobo Vázquez & Gustavo Loza	May 18, 2021	1.5
Fran joins Los Cascabelillos, an alternative indie rock band. When they think of rehearsing in the apartment, Paco is furious, although someone will make him change his mind. Guest stars: Armando Hernández as Brayan Dannielle, Leonardo De Lozanne as Leonardo, Ximena Duggan as Lila, Ximena Loza as Camila
71	7	"Ciao, Ragazzi"	Luciana Silveyra	May 25, 2021	1.5
Fran and El Borrego invite an Italian exchange student to stay in their apartment all summer long thinking that it is a woman. Guest stars: Begoña Narváez as Miranda, Armando Hernández as Brayan Dannielle, Oswaldo Zárate as Borrego, Pasquale Di Nuzzo as Andrea
72	8	"La forma del sapolote"	Jacobo Vázquez	June 1, 2021	N/A
Fran and El Borrego make a short film for university that has Toña and Brayan Dannielle as protagonists. Guest stars: Armando Hernández as Brayan Dannielle, Oswaldo Zárate as Borrego, Laura Montijano as Sofi
73	9	"Entre abogados te veas"	Adrián Zurita	June 8, 2021	1.5
Miranda sues Paco for loss of time during their relationship. Beto recommends a very peculiar lawyer to Paco to face her in court. Guest star: Roberto Palazuelos as Beto, Begoña Narváez as Miranda, Jesús Ochoa as Lic. Barajas, Elsa Ortiz as Lic. Favela, Norma Angélica as Judge
74	10	"Que viva el amor"	Adrián Zurita	June 15, 2021	1.6
Toña and Brayan Dannielle have a strong argument and break up. However, Pascal, Toña's French boyfriend, returns to make her forget her sadness, but Brayan is not willing to lose her. Guest stars: Armando Hernández as Brayan Dannielle, Eivaut Rischen as Pascal
75	11	"Se nos casa Antoña"	Gustavo Loza	June 22, 2021	1.5
Toña is undecided, as she doesn't know whether to marry Brayan Dannielle or Pascal, but after clearing her mind she celebrates her bachelorette party. Guest stars: Begoña Narváez as Miranda, Armando Hernández as Brayan Dannielle, Oswaldo Zárate as Borrego, Eivaut Rischen as Pascal
76	12	"La Boda de Toña"	Gustavo Loza & Adrián Zurita	June 29, 2021	1.6
After the excesses of their bachelor parties, Toña and Brayan Danielle's wedding day arrives, but it is in danger of not taking place. Guest stars: Begoña Narváez as Miranda, Armando Hernández as Brayan Dannielle, Oswaldo Zárate as Borrego, Eivaut Rischen as Pascal

=== Season 7 (2021) ===
No. overall	No. in season	Title	Written by	Original release date	Viewers (millions)
77	1	"Clavado en La Quebrada"	Gustavo Loza	September 28, 2021	1.6
Toña goes partying in Acapulco to forget Brayan. Brayan wants to get Toña back, but to return to her he must jump from La Quebrada. Guest stars: Begoña Narváez as Miranda, Armando Hernández as Brayan Dannielle, Oswaldo Zárate as Borrego, Rischen Ewout Marijn as Pascal, Paulina Menéndez as Laurie, David López as Rocio's hunk, Gladys Rosique as Brisa, Carlos Larragaña as Azael
78	2	"Y volver volver"	Gustavo Loza & Mary Carmen Ramírez	October 5, 2021	1.9
Brayan jumps from La Quebrada to obtain Toña's forgiveness. Everything gets complicated when Irmita visits a recovering Brayan. Guest stars: Begoña Narváez as Miranda, Armando Hernández as Brayan Dannielle, Oswaldo Zárate as Borrego, Rischen Ewout Marijn as Pascal, Paulina Menéndez as Laurie, Alma Cero as Irmita
79	3	"Adiós Miranda"	Adrián Zurita & Gustavo Loza	October 12, 2021	2.0
Paco believes that Miranda will come to him to apologize for her infidelity in Acapulco, but she confesses that she is pregnant. Guest stars: Begoña Narváez as Miranda, Armando Hernández as Brayan Dannielle, Oswaldo Zárate as Borrego
80	4	"See you later, Fran"	Jacobo Vázquez Abén	October 19, 2021	1.9
Fran and El Borrego want to go to live in New York on exchange, but one of them will be rejected. The beautiful Jeanine will advise them and will dazzle Paco. Guest stars: Armando Hernández as Brayan Dannielle, Oswaldo Zárate as Borrego, Pamela Cortés as Jeanine
81	5	"El que se fue a la villa"	Luciana Silveyra & Gustavo Loza	October 26, 2021	2.0
The apartment feels empty without Fran, but El Borrego comes to occupy Fran's space and causes a lot of problems. Guest stars: Oswaldo Zárate as Borrego, Nashla Aguilar as Mary, Nicole Harold as Pili
82	6	"Chío paracaidista"	Mary Carmen Ramírez	November 2, 2021	1.5
After not being with Fran and not having received Paco's pension, Rocío plans to move into the apartment for a while, but is surprised to learn that El Borrego is already living there. Guest stars: Armando Hernández as Brayan Dannielle, Oswaldo Zárate as Borrego, Nashla Aguilar as Mary, Nicole Harold as Pili, Federico Espejo as Mateo
83	7	"Se busca trabajo"	Mary Carmen Ramírez	November 9, 2021	1.8
Paco pushes Borrego to find a job and in the chosen job he falls in love with a beautiful DJ. Guest stars: Armando Hernández as Brayan Dannielle, Nashla Aguilar as Mary, Nicole Harold as Pili, Federico Espejo as Mateo, Amaranta Ruiz as Congresswoman, Katia Bada as Simone
84	8	"After party"	Gustavo Loza	November 16, 2021	1.8
Paco has an intense relationship with Simone, which causes him health problems due to so much partying. Guest stars: Armando Hernández as Brayan Dannielle, Katia Bada as Simone, Jorge Pérez Zamora as Doctor, Oswaldo Zárate as Borrego
85	9	"Pacosterona"	Gustavo Loza	November 23, 2021	1.8
Paco fails in intimacy with Simone and his cousin Beto recommends an urologist. El Borrego becomes Laura's boyfriend. Guest stars: Roberto Palazuelos as Beto, Katia Bada as Simone, Armando Hernández as Brayan Dannielle, Sophie Alexander as Laura, Ximena Herrera as Urologist
86	10	"Tulum, we have a problem"	Jacobo Vázquez Abén	November 30, 2021	1.8
Paco stalks Simone, who has a gig in Tulum, and makes a scene of jealousy when she returns despite Toña's advice. Guest stars: Armando Hernández as Brayan Dannielle, Sophie Alexander as Laura, Katia Bada as Simone
87	11	"El candidato de Toña"	Adrián Zurita	December 7, 2021	1.9
Macedonio will be a congressman and now he starts flirting with Toña, but Brayan Danielle is ready to separate them. Guest stars: Armando Hernández as Brayan Dannielle, Gerardo Taracena as Macedonio
88	12	"Vota por Mulata"	Mary Carmen Ramírez & Gustavo Loza	December 14, 2021	1.8
Macedonio retaliates against Paco, Toña, Brayan and El Borre, forcing them to make a truce. Guest stars: Armando Hernández as Brayan Dannielle, Gerardo Taracena as Macedonio, Katia Bada as Simone

=== Season 8 (2022) ===
No. overall	No. in season	Title	Written by	Original release date	Viewers (millions)
89	1	"Tattoo por amor"	Adrián Zurita & Gustavo Loza	April 26, 2022	1.6
El Borre convinces Paco and Brayan Danielle to get tattoos of their significant others to convince them to get back together. Guest stars: Armando Hernández as Brayan Dannielle, Oswaldo Zárate as Borrego, Katia Bada as Simone, Emma Escalante as Melanie
90	2	"Tatuados sin gloria"	Jacobo Vazquez Abén	May 3, 2022	1.9
Looking to get rid of Simone's tattoo, Paco meets Mila, who will take him and Borrego to a secret cult of women. Guest stars: Armando Hernández as Brayan Dannielle, Julieta Grajales as Mila, Ilithya Manzanilla as Madre Luna
91	3	"La convención"	Adrián Zurita & Gustavo Loza	May 10, 2022	1.6
Toña returns from a maids' convention and brings Magali, a Cuban colleague, as an exchange student. Guest stars: Armando Hernández as Brayan Dannielle, Yare Santana as Magali
92	4	"La Matchmaker"	Luciana Silveyra & Gustavo Loza	May 17, 2022	1.5
Toña and El Borre try to find a girlfriend for Paco with a matchmaker. Guest stars: Armando Hernández as Brayan Dannielle, Tony Serdán as Julieta
93	5	"Una Julieta sin Romeo"	Gustavo Loza	May 24, 2022	1.5
Paco wakes up with Julieta, but then makes a jealousy scene and Toña helps him apologize to her. Guest stars: Armando Hernández as Brayan Dannielle, Tony Serdán as Julieta
94	6	"Alushe standupero"	Mary Carmen Ramírez & Gustavo Loza	May 31, 2022	1.4
Paco's friend Alushe asks him for asylum after being left with nothing. Toña and Borre advise Alushe to become a tiktoker or stand-up comedian. Guest stars: Armando Hernández as Brayan Dannielle, Carlos Espejel as Alushe
95	7	"Una pareja de 3"	Adrián Zurita & Gustavo Loza	June 7, 2022	1.5
Paco decides to start a polyamorous relationship with Mary and Kenya, friends of Borrego. Guest stars: Armando Hernández as Brayan Dannielle, Rocío García as Kenya, Muriel Hernández as Mary
96	8	"Bienvenido Fran"	Mary Carmen Ramírez & Gustavo Loza	June 14, 2022	2.0
Fran returns from New York with several surprises. Upon his return, everyone prepares a party for him. Guest stars: Armando Hernández as Brayan Dannielle, Roberto Palazuelos as Beto, Bárbara de Regil as Mariana
97	9	"Mi yerno gringo"	Gustavo Loza	June 21, 2022	1.6
Fran receives a visit from New York, his boyfriend Ryan. Guest stars: Armando Hernández as Brayan Dannielle, Daniel Raymont as Ryan
98	10	"Es de sabios cambiar de opinión"	Jacobo Vázquez Abén	July 5, 2022	1.6
Paco sends Fran to Silvana, who remembers his romantic past. Meanwhile, Toña thinks she is pregnant. Guest stars: Armando Hernández as Brayan Dannielle, Daniel Raymont as Ryan, Montserrat Oliver as Silvana Mora, Fernando Chávez Liza as Francito
99	11	"El crimen del padre Memo"	Adrián Zurita & Gustavo Loza	July 12, 2022	1.8
Toña finally says yes to Brayan Danielle at the altar and father Memo takes the opportunity to be very close to Rocío. Guest stars: Armando Hernández as Brayan Dannielle
100	12	"Nunca digas de esta agua no beberé"	Mary Carmen Ramírez & Gustavo Loza	July 19, 2022	1.9
Fran says goodbye to return to New York with Ryan. Meanwhile, Paco and Rocio give each other another chance to be together. Guest stars: Armando Hernández as Brayan Dannielle

=== Season 9 (2022) ===
No. overall	No. in season	Title	Written by	Original release date	Viewers (millions)
101	1	"Hijo de tigre pintito"	Gustavo Loza	October 11, 2022	1.9
Paco receives a visit from Julie, an ex-girlfriend, who tells him that 18 years ago she had his son, Lucas. Paco agrees let Lucas stay at his house until he finds out whether or not he is his son. Guest stars: Issabela Camil as Julie
102	2	"El niño espurio"	Mary Carmen Ramírez	October 18, 2022	1.7
Rocío suspects that Paco cheated on her while they were still married. Lucas and Paco take a DNA test. Guest stars: Issabela Camil as Julie, Ximena Herrera as Doctor
103	3	"Amor de secundaria"	Adrián Zurita	October 25, 2022	1.9
Paco hires a mover to take Rocío's things, who turns out to be Toña's ex-boyfriend. Guest stars: Luis Fernando Peña as Ismael
104	4	"La Deportada"	Jacobo Vázquez Abén & Gustavo Loza	November 1, 2022	1.7
A foreign friend of Fran's arrives to spend a few days in the apartment after having been deported and immediately forms a close relationship with Lucas. Guest stars: Ingrid Aver as Dani
105	5	"El Garañón de oriente"	Mary Carmen Ramírez	November 8, 2022	1.7
Toña discovers that Brayan opened a profile on Tinder, so she pretends to be someone else to catch him. Guest stars: Ingrid Aver as Dani
106	6	"Yo iba para futbolista"	Jacobo Vázquez Abén	November 15, 2022	1.6
Paco tells that he was a soccer player and in a match he gets hurt, after which Moisés Muñoz reveals the whole truth, but also sends him to a physiotherapist with whom he falls in love at first sight. Guest stars: Moisés Muñoz as himself, Susana Emilia Jiménez as Joss
107	7	"Terapia a domicilio"	Gustavo Loza	November 22, 2022	N/A
Paco is going out with Joss, but his jealousy, confusing the professional with the personal, will cause him to fail again in love. Guest stars: Susana Emilia Jiménez as Joss, Renata Gutiérrez as Chava Ortiz
108	8	"El Club de la pelea"	Adrián Zurita & Gustavo Loza	November 29, 2022	1.5
Lucas decides to drop out of college and pursue his dream, so he becomes Brayan Danielle's manager and gets him into boxing. Guest stars: Luis Felipe Tovar as Don Lauro, Isabela Córdoba as Alice
109	9	"Cuando el bótox nos alcance"	Jacobo Vázquez Abén & Gustavo Loza	December 6, 2022	N/A
Isabela, a friend of Lucas, tells Paco that he should take better care of his physique, so he decides to get botox but has an unexpected outcome. Guest stars: Issabela Camil as Julie, Montserrat Ramirez as the Cosmiatrist, Pia Requejo as Isabela
110	10	"Una visita inesperada"	Adrián Zurita	December 13, 2022	1.6
Brayan and Toña go to the wake of his cousin Natas' grandmother, but on their way back they bring a spirit from the cemetery. Guest stars: Inna Moll as Martha, Ana Elvia Martínez as Doña Armida, Antonio Monroe as The Witch Doctor
111	11	"El onomástico de Toña"	Mary Carmen Ramírez & Gustavo Loza	December 20, 2022	1.5
Everyone seems to have forgotten Toña's birthday, but they make it up to her with a party where everything gets out of control. Guest stars: Inna Moll as Martha, Nashla Aguilar as Kardashian 1, Nicole Ávila as Kardashian 2
112	12	"Cuando los hermanos se encuentran"	Gustavo Loza	December 27, 2022	1.9
Fran announces that he is returning to Mexico, Lucas wants to meet him, but Paco, Toña and Brayan are worried about how he will react to meeting his brother.

=== Season 10 (2023) ===
All twelve tenth-season episodes released on Vix on September 26, 2023.

No. overall	No. in season	Title	Written by	Original release date	Viewers (millions)
113	1	"Mi hermano Lucas"	Gustavo Loza	October 3, 2023	2.2
Guest stars: Mauricio Garza as Fran
114	2	"De Nueva York a Celayork"	Gustavo Loza & Adrián Zurita	October 10, 2023	2.3
Guest stars: Mauricio Garza as Fran, Daniel Raymont as Ryan
115	3	"Tu mamá me mima"	Jacobo Vázquez Abén	October 17, 2023	2.5
Guest stars: Mauricio Garza as Fran, Issabela Camil as Julie
116	4	"Bucket List"	Mary Carmen Ramírez	October 24, 2023	2.2
Guest stars: Mauricio Garza as Fran, Camila Selser as Lorena, Issabela Camil as Julie
117	5	"No hay peor ciego..."	Mary Carmen Ramírez & Gustavo Loza	October 31, 2023	2.7
Guest stars: Mauricio Garza as Fran, Ximena Loza as Camila
118	6	"Fashionista"	Jacobo Vázquez Abén	November 7, 2023	2.4
Guest stars: Mauricio Garza as Fran, Ximena Loza as Camila, Citlalli Anaya as Claudine, Diego Soldano as Rocco
119	7	"El que esté libre de pecado..."	Gustavo Loza	November 14, 2023	2.0
Guest stars: Guillermo Cossío as Father Memo, Citlalli Anaya as Claudine
120	8	"El Cumbia Open"	Adrián Zurita & Gustavo Loza	November 21, 2023	1.7
Guest stars: Daniela Uni as Debbie, Alma Cero as Irmita, Luis Fernando Peña as Ismael
121	9	"Se te dijo"	Jacobo Vázquez Abén	November 28, 2023	2.0
Guest star: Yare Santana as Magali
122	10	"Las gorilas de Lucas"	Adrián Zurita	December 5, 2023	1.8
Guest star: Isabel Burr as Ale
123	11	"La Victoria de Don Paquis"	Mary Carmen Ramírez	December 12, 2023	1.7
Guest star: Martha Cristina as Victoria
124	12	"No estamos solos"	Gustavo Loza	December 19, 2023	1.2
Guest star: Sarah Nichols as Maia

=== Season 11 (2024) ===
No. overall	No. in season	Title	Written by	Original release date
125	1	"La que se fue a la villa"	Gustavo Loza	October 3, 2024
Guest stars: Begoña Narváez as Miranda, Issabela Camil as Julie, Sarah Nichols as Maia
126	2	"¿La cubana o yo?"	Jacobo Vázquez Abén	October 10, 2024
Guest stars: Begoña Narváez as Miranda, Yare Santana as Magali
127	3	"La criada no tan bien criada"	Mary Carmen Ramírez	October 17, 2024
Guest stars: Begoña Narváez as Miranda, Viktor Arauz as Leandra Alessandra
128	4	"Abuelita soy tu nieto"	Jacobo Vázquez Abén	October 24, 2024
Guest stars: Begoña Narváez as Miranda, Roxana Castellanos as Carla
129	5	"Campamento para refugiados"	Mary Carmen Ramírez	November 7, 2024
Guest stars: Begoña Narváez as Miranda, Denia Agalianou as Anastasia, Sergey Boyarkin, Natalia Osykhovska, Fedor Shcherbinin
130	6	"Tres hombres y un bebé"	Mary Carmen Ramírez	November 14, 2024
Guest stars: Begoña Narváez as Miranda, Greta Belmonte as the Babysitter, Xabiani Ponce de León as Luis Tommasi
131	7	"Welcome back"	Jacobo Vázquez Abén	November 21, 2024
Guest stars: Begoña Narváez as Miranda, Haniel Isla as Rosa
132	8	"La neta del planeta"	Mary Carmen Ramírez	November 28, 2024
Guest star: Begoña Narváez as Miranda
133	9	"Solo fans"	Mary Carmen Ramírez	December 5, 2024
Guest star: Karla Vanessa Suárez as Fernanda
134	10	"Desencantador de perros"	Jacobo Vázquez Abén	December 12, 2024
Guest stars: Aranza Carreiro as Daniela, Meteora Fontana as Carmelita
135	11	"La sagrada familia"	Mary Carmen Ramírez	December 19, 2024
Guest stars: Sophie Alexander as Laura, Ximena Loza as Camila, Issabela Camil as Julie, Carlos Corona as Raúl
136	12	"El cumple de Paco"	Jacobo Vázquez Abén	December 26, 2024
Guest stars: Issabela Camil as Julie, Carlos Espejel as Alushe, Viktor Arauz as Leandra Alessandra, Valentina Hazouki, Lorenza Santana

=== Season 12 (2025) ===
No. overall	No. in season	Title	Written by	Original release date	Viewers (millions)
137	1	"Se casa mi ex"	Unknown	April 1, 2025	0.81
138	2	"Ceci la veci"	Unknown	April 1, 2025	0.81
139	3	"Una sopa de su propio chocolate"	Unknown	April 2, 2025	1.15
140	4	"El podcast"	Unknown	April 2, 2025	1.15
141	5	"Terapia gratuita"	Unknown	April 3, 2025	1.08
142	6	"Despedida de casada"	Unknown	April 3, 2025	1.08
143	7	"A cortar los cables"	Unknown	April 7, 2025	1.07
144	8	"Galán de telenovela"	Unknown	April 7, 2025	1.07
145	9	"Descanse en pants"	Unknown	April 8, 2025	1.01
146	10	"Lucas el pelucas"	Unknown	April 8, 2025	1.01
147	11	"Toña vidente"	Unknown	April 9, 2025	1.42
148	12	"Se me van"	Unknown	April 9, 2025	1.42
