= ¡Ay Güey! =

Mexican television series

- Genre: Comedy
- Created by: Rodolfo de Anda
- Written by: Doris Camarena
- Directed by: Santiago Viteri; Benny Corral; Gilberto G. Fazi
- Starring: Alejandra Ambrosi; Vanessa Terkes; Diana Bracho; Salvador Zerboni; María Adelaida Puerta; Leonardo García; Raúl Román; Salvador Pineda; Ramón Medina; Gabiela Zas; Mario Escalante; Esteban Franco
- Opening theme: "¡Ay Güey!" by Los Claxons
- Country of origin: Mexico
- Original language: Spanish
- No. of seasons: 1
- No. of episodes: 13

Production
- Executive producer: Rodolfo de Anda
- Producer: Antonio Bautista
- Production company: Televisa

Original release
- Network: Blim
- Release: 24 December 2017 – 28 January 2018

¡Ay Güey! is a Mexican comedy series that premiered on Blim on 24 December 2017 and is produced by Rodolfo de Anda. It stars Alejandra Ambrosi and Vanessa Terkes. The series follows two women who are not friends, don't like each other and work in different things, but for situations in life they find a suitcase with 10 million dollars.

== Plot ==
Susana (Alejandra Ambrosi) and Verónica (Vanessa Terkes) are two women who unexpectedly trip over a suitcase that contains 10 million dollars, and from that moment they are immersed in a singular flight, to escape from the thugs that pursue them to recover their money. In that escape, Susana and Verónica are confused with two rich heiresses, which will confront them to a world completely unknown to them.

== Cast ==
- Alejandra Ambrosi as Susana
- Vanessa Terkes as Verónica
- Diana Bracho as Sra. Beatriz Rothstein
- Salvador Zerboni as Pepe De La Peña
- María Adelaida Puerta as Kiki De Los Monteros
- Leonardo García as Óscar
- Raúl Román as Rolando
- Salvador Pineda as Don Chuy
- Ramón Medina as Carmelo
- Gabiela Zas as July
- Mario Escalante as El Boiler
- Esteban Franco as Comandante Bermúdez

== Production ==
Production of the series began in September 2016. Filming took place in Acapulco and lasted for four months.

== Episodes ==
No.	Title	Original release date
1	"El inicio"	24 December 2017
Susana and Verónica are two women who are kidnapped by thugs. They manage to flee, and discover that there is a suitcase with 10 million dollars in the food truck. Persecuted by thugs and police, they have to change their identity. Guest stars: Juan Carlos Colombo as Lic. Jáuregui, Patricia Conde as Sra. De La Peña, Eduardo Manzano Jr. as El Director
2	"Una nueva vida"	24 December 2017
In their escape, Susana and Verónica are confused with the daughters of an important woman. Received by Beatriz Rosthein, business associate of their deceased mother, they go along with the confusion in what they find the moment to escape. Mrs. Rothstein is determined to discover who they really are. Guest stars: Juan Carlos Colombo as Lic. Jáuregui
3	"Escándalo"	24 December 2017
Susana and Veronica are harassed by the press and photographed in compromising situations. Mrs. Rothstein tries to force them to give a conference to clarify all the problems they caused. Guest stars: Juan Carlos Colombo as Lic. Jáuregui
4	"La revelación"	31 December 2017
Susana and Verónica try to escape from the hotel, but July follows them everywhere. Mrs. Rothstein follows Susana and Verónica to the airport and calls them by their real name. Guest stars: Juan Carlos Colombo as Lic. Jáuregui, Humberto Elizondo as Lombardi
5	"La herencia"	31 December 2017
Susana and Veronica agree to pass themselves off as the real sisters of La Peña. Pepe is determined to keep the family's fortune and tries to prevent Susana and Verónica from signing the necessary documents. Guest stars: Juan Carlos Colombo as Lic. Jáuregui
6	"La cita"	7 January 2018
Susana and Verónica decide to stay in Acapulco until they find out if the mother of the Peña sisters was murdered or not. Veronica receives a call from a kidnapper who asks for a large amount of money to save Susana.
7	"Finalmente hermanas"	7 January 2018
Pepe discovers that Susana and Oscar Ferrer have something to do due to some photographs published in a magazine. Mrs. Rothstein tells Susana and Veronica that she will give them everything they need to make them look like their social class. Guest stars: Juan Carlos Colombo as Lic. Jáuregui
8	"La traición"	14 January 2018
Bermúdez threatens Verónica and Susana with a weapon and demands that they return his money, but one of their bodyguards defends them. Kiki begins to suspect that the sisters of the Peña could be usurpers. Guest stars: Juan Carlos Colombo as Lic. Jáuregui, Humberto Elizondo as Lombardi
9	"La huida"	14 January 2018
Susana y Verónica flee Acapulco believing that Mrs. Rothstein betrayed them. Pepe gives an interview to speak badly of Veronica and Susana so he can keep the fortune of the family. Guest stars: Juan Carlos Colombo as Lic. Jáuregui
10	"Volver a empezar"	21 January 2018
Susana y Verónica try to find a hotel in the city where they can hide and keep the money in the safe. Boiler and Mrs. Rothstein desperately search for girls in the city.
11	"El karma nunca falla"	21 January 2018
A hotel employee finds Mrs. Rothstein to inform her of the location of the girls. Susana takes Veronica with tricks to a filming where the director who tried to abuse her is and show her that she has not overcome that trauma. Guest stars: Eduardo Manzano Jr. as El Director
12	"Segunda vuelta"	28 January 2018
Susana and Verónica try to escape from the man whose money was stolen and he begins to pursue them. Mrs. Rothstein confesses in front of the press that Pepe is adopted. Guest stars: Juan Carlos Colombo as Lic. Jáuregui, Humberto Elizondo as Lombardi
13	"Caminos misteriosos"	28 January 2018
Mrs. Rothstein discovers that all her accounts have been frozen. Susana is kidnapped by the men who were robbed, and Veronica has the last decision.

== See also ==
- Güey
