= Michelle Rodriguez (disambiguation) =

Michelle Rodriguez (born 1978) is an American actress.

Michelle Rodriguez may also refer to:

- Michelle Rodríguez (tennis), French-Chilean tennis player
- Michelle Rodríguez (Mexican actress)
- Michelle Rodriguez (politician), member of the California State Assembly
