= Perdiendo el juicio =

Mexican comedy series

- Genre: Sitcom
- Created by: Guillermo del Bosque
- Written by: Juan Carlos Castellanos; Jurgan Jacobo; Mauricio Jalife
- Directed by: Rafael Perrín
- Starring: Roberto Palazuelos; Lola Cortés; Alejandro Tomassi; Jorge van Rankin; Paul Stanley; Juan Carlos Nava; Hugo Alcántara
- Country of origin: Mexico
- Original language: Spanish
- No. of seasons: 2
- No. of episodes: 24

Production
- Executive producer: Guillermo del Bosque
- Producers: César González; Vicente Escalante
- Production company: TelevisaUnivision

Original release
- Network: Las Estrellas
- Release: 27 September 2021 – 18 July 2022

Perdiendo el juicio is a Mexican comedy series produced by Guillermo del Bosque for TelevisaUnivision. It premiered on Las Estrellas on 27 September 2021. The series stars Roberto Palazuelos, Lola Cortés, Alejandro Tomassi, Jorge van Rankin, Paul Stanley, Juan Carlos Nava, and Hugo Alcántar.

The series has been renewed for a second season, that premiered on 25 April 2022.

== Premise ==
Each episode of the series features a celebrity being put on trial for an offense they have committed or for something they are accused of in the artistic world.

== Cast ==
- Roberto Palazuelos (season 1)
- Lola Cortés
- Alejandro Tomassi (season 1)
- Jorge van Rankin
- Paul Stanley
- Juan Carlos Nava
- Hugo Alcántara
- Jesús Ochoa (season 2)
- Alexis Ayala (season 2)
- Luis Felipe Tovar (season 2)

== Production ==
Filming of the series began on 2 September 2021. Filming of the second season began on 2 March 2022.

== Episodes ==
=== Series overview ===
Series	Episodes	Originally released	
Series	Episodes	First released	Last released
1	12	13 September 2021	13 December 2021
2	12	25 April 2022	18 July 2022

=== Season 1 (2021) ===
No. overall	No. in season	Title	Original release date	Mexico viewers (millions)
1	1	"Albertano Santacruz"	27 September 2021	1.6
Guest stars: Ariel Miramontes as Albertano Santacruz
2	2	"Alfredo Adame"	4 October 2021	1.6
Guest stars: Alfredo Adame as himself
3	3	"Los Mascabrothers"	11 October 2021	1.7
Guest stars: Freddy Ortega as himself, Germán Ortega as himself
4	4	"Eduardo Yáñez"	18 October 2021	1.8
Guest stars: Eduardo Yáñez as himself
5	5	"Doña Márgara Francisca"	25 October 2021	1.6
Guest stars: Eduardo España as Doña Márgara Francisca
6	6	"Doña Lucha"	1 November 2021	N/A
Guest stars: Mara Escalante as Doña Lucha
7	7	"El Coque Muñiz"	8 November 2021	1.5
Guest stars: El Coque Muñiz as himself
8	8	"Alexis Ayala"	15 November 2021	1.7
Guest stars: Alexis Ayala as himself
9	9	"Roberto Palazuelos"	22 November 2021	1.6
10	10	"La Chupitos"	29 November 2021	1.5
Guest stars: Liliana Arriaga as La Chupitos
11	11	"Guerra de chistes"	6 December 2021	1.9
Guest stars: Radamés de Jesús as himself, Juan Carlos Casasola as himself
12	12	"Deyanira Rubí y ¿dos Charlys?"	13 December 2021	1.7
Guest stars: Roxana Castellanos as Deyanira Rubí

=== Season 2 (2022) ===
No. overall	No. in season	Title	Original release date	Mexico viewers (millions)
13	1	"Adela Micha"	25 April 2022	1.6
Guest stars: Adela Micha as herself, Maca Carriedo as herself, Freddy Ortega as La Jitomata, Germán Ortega as La Perejila, Ariel Miramontes as Albertano
14	2	"El Burro van Rankin"	2 May 2022	1.7
Guest stars: Arath de la Torre as himself, Raúl Araiza as himself, Emilio Azcárraga Jean as himself
15	3	"Lucía Méndez"	9 May 2022	1.5
Guest star: Lucía Méndez as herself
16	4	"Chuponcito"	16 May 2022	1.2
17	5	"Miguel "El Piojo" Herrera"	23 May 2022	1.2
Guest stars: Miguel Herrera as himself, Marisol González as herself, Moisés Muñoz as himself
18	6	"Guerra de chistes contra Wanders Lover"	30 May 2022	1.2
Guest stars: Juan Carlos Casasola as himself, El Borrego Nava as himself, Radamés de Jesús as himself, La Wanders Lover as herself
19	7	"Sergio Mayer"	6 June 2022	1.1
Guest stars: Sergio Mayer as himself, Latin Lover as himself, Issabela Camil as herself
20	8	"Toño de Valdés y El Perro Bermúdez"	13 June 2022	1.3
Guest stars: Toño de Valdés as himself, Enrique Bermúdez as himself, Oswaldo Sánchez as himself, Francisco Fonseca as himself
21	9	"Edson Zúñiga 'El Norteño'"	20 June 2022	1.6
Guest stars: Edson Zúñiga as himself, Raquel Bigorra as herself
22	10	"Yordi Rosado"	4 July 2022	1.5
Guest stars: Yordi Rosado as himself, Michelle Vieth as herself, Roxana Castellanos as herself
23	11	"El Pirrurris"	11 July 2022	1.7
Guest stars: Luis de Alba as himself, Pepe Magaña as himself, Carlos Bonavides as Hüicho Domínguez
24	12	"Platanito"	18 July 2022	1.5
Guest star: Sergio Verduzco as Platanito

== Ratings ==
Viewership and ratings per season of Perdiendo el juicio
Season	Timeslot (CT)	Episodes	First aired		Last aired		Avg. viewers (millions)
Season	Timeslot (CT)	Episodes	Date	Viewers (millions)	Date	Viewers (millions)	Avg. viewers (millions)
1	Monday 11:00 pm	12	27 September 2021	1.6	13 December 2021	1.7	1.65
2	Monday 11:00 pm	12	25 April 2022	1.6	18 July 2022	1.5	1.43
