= Oríllese a la orilla =

- Genre: Sitcom
- Created by: Gustavo Loza
- Starring: Michelle Rodríguez; Mario Zaragoza; Jesús Ochoa; Luis Rodríguez "Guana"; María Elena Saldaña; Ana Jimena Villanueva; Sofía Aragón; Archie Balardi; Armando Hernández
- Composer: Amado López
- Country of origin: Mexico
- Original language: Spanish
- No. of seasons: 2
- No. of episodes: 24

Production
- Executive producers: Ricardo Coeto; Francisco Cordero; Gustavo Loza; Alfredo Marrón Santander
- Producer: Rafael Martínez Flores
- Editor: Isaac Verdugo
- Production company: Lado B

Original release
- Network: Vix
- Release: 12 July 2024

Related
- 40 y 20

Oríllese a la orilla is a Mexican television sitcom created by Gustavo Loza. A spin-off of 40 y 20, it follows Toña (Michelle Rodríguez) and Brayan Daniel (Armando Hernández), who enroll in a police academy after losing their jobs when Brayan Daniel is accused of being an accomplice to robberies in the condominium. The series also stars Mario Zaragoza, Jesús Ochoa, Luis Rodríguez, María Elena Saldaña, Ana Jimena Villanueva, Sofía Aragón, and Archie Balardi. It premiered on Vix on 12 July 2024. The second season premiered on 12 December 2025.

== Cast ==
=== Main ===
- Michelle Rodríguez as Toña
- Mario Zaragoza as Captain Bonavena
- Jesús Ochoa as Licenciado Barajas
- Luis Rodríguez "Guana" as Popoca
- María Elena Saldaña as Catita
- Ana Jimena Villanueva as Marichelo
- Sofía Aragón as Dr. Susy
- Archie Balardi as Franelas
- Armando Hernández as Brayan Daniel

=== Recurring and guest stars ===
- Jorge van Rankin as Paco
- Bruno Loza as Lucas
- Alma Cero as Irmita
- Sophie Alexander as Laura
- Enrique Arreola as Licenciado Zamarripa
- José Montini

== Episodes ==
Season	Episodes	Originally released
1	12	12 July 2024
2	12	12 December 2025

=== Season 1 (2024) ===
No. overall	No. in season	Title	Written by	Original release date
1	1	"¿Y si nos hacemos policías?"	Gustavo Loza	12 July 2024
2	2	"Abuso de poder"	Gustavo Loza	12 July 2024
3	3	"Lección no aprendida"	Jacobo Vázquez Abén	12 July 2024
4	4	"Reventando al cadete Brayan"	Guillermo Ríos	12 July 2024
5	5	"Fuera de lugar"	Jacobo Vázquez Abén	12 July 2024
6	6	"Simulacro en la comandancia"	Gustavo Loza	12 July 2024
7	7	"El misterioso caso de la tanga roja"	Gustavo Loza	12 July 2024
8	8	"Celda que más aplauda"	Jacobo Vázquez Abén	12 July 2024
9	9	"Desesperadamente buscando a Susana"	Gustavo Loza & Carlos Manzo	12 July 2024
10	10	"Los chambelanes"	Guillermo Ríos	12 July 2024
11	11	"Una visita inesperada"	Jacobo Vázquez Abén	12 July 2024
12	12	"La bomba"	Mary Carmen Ramírez	12 July 2024

=== Season 2 (2025) ===
No. overall	No. in season	Title	Written by	Original release date
13	1	"La terapia"	Unknown	12 December 2025
14	2	"Más vale solos que mal acompañados"	Unknown	12 December 2025
15	3	"2 de 3 caídas"	Unknown	12 December 2025
16	4	"Elvis al torito"	Unknown	12 December 2025
17	5	"Archivo muerto"	Unknown	12 December 2025
18	6	"Un payaso para Catita"	Unknown	12 December 2025
19	7	"Las elecciones"	Unknown	12 December 2025
20	8	"La pastorela"	Unknown	12 December 2025
21	9	"El día del policía"	Unknown	12 December 2025
22	10	"Toña's Party"	Unknown	12 December 2025
23	11	"Presunto Popoca"	Unknown	12 December 2025
24	12	"La dama de hierro"	Unknown	12 December 2025
