= Guadalupe-Reyes Marathon =

Festive Christmas season in Mexican culture

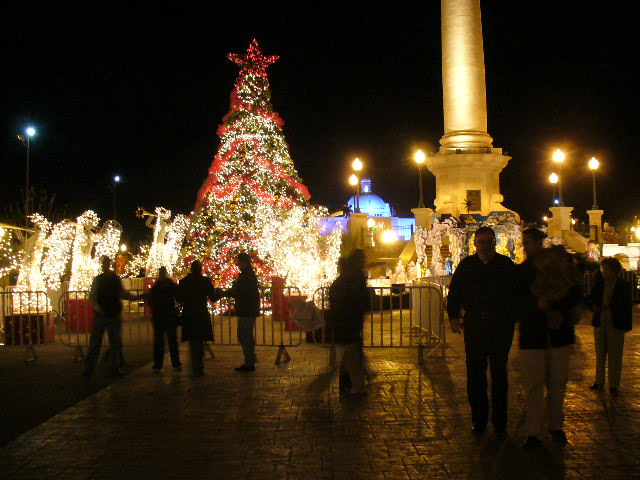
Christmas tree and lights in the main plaza of the city of Chihuahua

Guadalupe-Reyes Marathon is a concept typical of Mexican culture, as a humorous name for the Mexican Christmas season. It began in the decade of the 1990s in Mexico and informally refers to the festive period from December 12 (Day of the Virgin of Guadalupe) to January 6 (Day of the Epiphany, popularly known as "Reyes Magos" or Three Wise Men). During this period there are several holidays which, linked together, create a "marathon" of festivities.

During this time, the informal challenge isn’t just attending the parties and celebrations, but also managing the physical toll from daily high-calorie food and alcohol consumption, along with the inevitable weight gain. The 'marathon' aspect of Guadalupe-Reyes is playful and lighthearted, highlighting the social essence of the season. It's a time when friends and family come together for meals, parties, and celebrations. This Marathon is not part of the Mexican Folklore; it is merely a pop-culture activity.

The concept originated from 'Guadalupe-Reyes,' the name of a 1990s police initiative aimed at reducing alcohol consumption and driving under the influence, along with ensuring the safety of the millions of pilgrims who travel during December.

The celebrations linked together by the Guadalupe-Reyes Marathon are:

- December 12: Day of the Virgin of Guadalupe.
- Every evening from December 16 to December 24: The nine Posadas parties.
- December 24: Last posada and Christmas Eve (Nochebuena).
- December 25: Christmas
- December 28: Holy Innocent's day, akin to April Fool’s Day, which in Mexico is remembered playing practical jokes.
- December 31: New Year's Eve
- January 1: New Year's Day
- January 6: Day of the Epiphany or Three Wise Men ("Reyes Magos")

The last celebration of the season is Candlemas (Day of Candelaria) on February 2. In Mexico, this festivity is linked to the feast of the Magi on January 6 by the traditional rosca de reyes. It is also common to celebrate consuming the traditional atole and tamales. However, being almost a month away from all the celebrations that happen in late December and early January, it is usually excluded from the "Marathon".

The 2019 Netflix film Guadalupe Reyes is based on two friends trying to party every day for the whole Guadalupe-Reyes season.

Since the late 2010s, the concept has gained popularity in other countries, such as Guatemala. Common celebrations include consuming alcoholic beverages daily leading up to a mass celebration on the last day of the festival.

== See also ==
- Christmas in Mexico
- Public holidays in Mexico
