= Salvador Zerboni =

Mexican actor (born 1979)

- Born: May 3, 1979 (age 46); Mexico City, Mexico
- Occupation: Actor

Salvador Zerboni (born May 3, 1979) is a Mexican actor who is best known for his work in Mexican Telenovelas.

== Career ==
Salvador Zerboni is famous for his role in film and television productions. He began his career in 2003 in a Chilean production, in the telenovela called Machos. Zerboni appeared in the television series RBD: La Familia in 2007 and in El Pantera in 2009. Salvador Zerboni took part in La Reina del Sur and Persons Unknown. He also appeared in Rudo y Cursi in 2008. In 2010 he contributed to the series Soy tu fan. The same year he participated in the series La Mariposa.

As of 2012 he had made his Televisa debut. He played the antagonist character Gabino Mendoza in the remake of 1996's series Cañaveral de pasiones in Abismo de pasión. In 2013 he took part in Libre para amarte with Gloria Trevi. He was also one of the main antagonists in the TV series when playing "Horacio Espinoza" in Quiero Amarte sharing credits with Karyme Lozano and Cristian de la Fuente. He was also one of three main antagonists in the TV series when he played "Leonel Madrigal" in A que no me dejas sharing credits with Camila Sodi and Osvaldo Benavides.

More recently, he has participated in a TV competition called Reto 4 Elementos, which consists of physical, mental and emotional challenges. He was booted off after an initial loss but returned and is currently participating on the team known as Vengadores.

== Filmography ==
=== Film roles ===
Year	Title	Role	Notes
2008	Rudo y Cursi	Jorge W	
2009	Melted Hearts	Brian Lauper	
2019	Guadalupe Reyes	Bobby	

=== Television roles ===
Year	Title	Role	Notes
2006	Rebelde	Mateo	
2007	RBD: La Familia	Daniel	
2009	El Pantera	Gabriel	
2010	Soy tu fan	Unknown role	
2011	La Reina del Sur	Ramiro Vargas "El Ratas"	
2012	Abismo de pasión	Gabino Mendoza	
2012	La Mariposa	Bill Smith	
2013	Libre para amarte	Norberto	Guest star
2013–14	Quiero amarte	Horacio Espinoza	
2015–16	A que no me dejas	Leonel Madrigal	
2017	El bienamado	Jairo Portela	
2017	¡Ay Güey!	Pepe De La Peña	
2018–2023	Reto 4 Elementos: Naturaleza Extrema	Himself - Contestant	32nd / 19th eliminated (season 1) Semifinalist (season 4)
2019	Nosotros los guapos	Jerry	Episode: "El yate"
2019	Decisiones: Unos ganan, otros pierden	Manuel	Episode: "Celos asesinos"
2020	Vecinos	Manolo	Episode: "Matrimonio perfecto"
2021–22	Parientes a la fuerza	Juan "Juancho" Hernández	
2022	La casa de los famosos	Housemate	Runner-up (season 2)
2023	Los 50	Himself - Contestant	
2024	Golpe de suerte	León Yurma	
2025	Top Chef VIP	Himself - Contestant	Season 4
