= La impostora =

- Genre: Telenovela
- Created by: Sebastián Arrau; Coca Gómez
- Screenplay by: Sebastián Arrau; José Vicente Spataro; Arturo Gonzalez Yanez; Sergio Mendoza; Gerardo Cadena; Coca Gómez
- Directed by: Carlos Villegas Rosales; Rodrigo Curiel
- Creative director: Maru González
- Starring: Christian Bach; Sebastián Zurita; Manuel Landeta; Armando Silvestre; Lisette Morelos
- Theme music composer: Alejandra Guzmán; Pablo Preciado Rojas
- Opening theme: "Para mí" performed by Alejandra Guzmán
- Country of origin: United States
- Original language: Spanish
- No. of episodes: 120

Production
- Executive producer: Daniel Camhi
- Producer: Marco Antonio López
- Cinematography: Jorge Rubio Cazarín; Juan Bernardo Sánchez Mejía
- Editors: Mauricio Espejel; Ramiro Pardo
- Camera setup: Multi-camera
- Production companies: Argos Comunicación; Telemundo Studios

Original release
- Network: Telemundo
- Release: 14 January – 3 July 2014

Related
- Marido en alquiler; Reina de corazones

La impostora (English: The Impostor), is a Spanish-language telenovela produced by United States–based television network Telemundo Studios, Miami. It is based on the Chilean telenovela Cerro Alegre, produced by Canal 13 in 1999. It stars Lisette Morelos, Sebastián Zurita and Christian Bach, together with Manuel Landeta, Begoña Narváez, Mauricio Hénao, Jonathan Islas and Alpha Acosta.

As part of the 2014 season, Telemundo is broadcasting La impostora as of 14 January 2014 weeknights at 8pm/7c, replacing Marido en Alquiler. As with most of its other telenovelas, the network is broadcasting English subtitles as closed captions on CC3.

== Plot ==
Blanca Guerrero (Lisette Morelos) is a cheerful and resourceful girl with a big heart, who works as a waitress dreaming of an acting career. At an early age, she began helping her father Memo as much as she could, due to her mother's early death. When Memo is unjustly fired by Raquel Altamira from his job at her family's company, where he worked for years, Blanca decides to go to the Altamira's end of the year costume party and notify Don Leonidas, the company's owner of the situation with her father, and hopefully convince him of rehiring him, and thanks to her amazing acting skills she is able to sneak her way in.

At the party, Blanca meets Eduardo, the very shy yet romantic son of Raquel, with whom she shares a passionate kiss at midnight, all while hiding her identity. The party goes however awry when Adriano Ferrer (Manuel Landeta), a rich businessman, crashes the party to reveal a secret affair, and child that he had years prior with Valentina Altamira, Raquel's younger sister. Adriano also accuses the Altamira family for the death of his young love Valentina, not knowing that she is actually alive, but is being detained in a psychiatric hospital by orders of her older sister Raquel.

A few days later, Adriano finds out that Memo, Blanca's father knows the truth about what happened to his and Valentina's child and goes to visit him at his home, but finds Blanca, the girl that had helped him while at the party days before, and she tells him that her father is in the hospital after being run over by a car. That same day, as Adriano goes to visit Memo at the hospital, he runs into Blanca disguised as a nurse and makes her an offer she can't refuse, promising her to help her pay her father's medical bills if she becomes "the impostor", helping him uncover the truth of what really happened to Valentina and his child. In the process, Blanca has to become Victoria San Marino, a millionaire investor from New York, get into partnership with the Altamira family and get Raquel Altamira to confide in her until she tells her the truth.

She then meets Raquel Altamira (Christian Bach), the eldest daughter of Leonidas, a cold and calculating woman who not only fired her father, but is also responsible for her dad being run over. While seeming as a widow who cherishes her late husband's memory and the perfect mother to her three sons, the shy Eduardo (Sebastian Zurita), the ambitious Cristobal (Jonathan Islas), and the dreamer Jorge (Mauricio Henao) who leads a double life, she is in reality the opposite of this, being a manipulative and ruthless woman. However, things get complicated as Blanca finds herself falling in love with Raquel's son Eduardo, who is dealing with the return of his daughter Sofia's mother, the beautiful yet evil Mariana Serrano (Begoña Narváez).

== Production ==
During the 2013 upfront, Telemundo announced La impostora as part of the 2014 season. The promotional trailer was produced, only with Litzy, Fabían Ríos, Felicia Mercado and Gerardo Murguía.

Recorded in Acapulco and México City, the story is an adaptation of Cerro Alegre. The writer Arrau confirmed that the plot of the telenovela change rather than a man would be a woman, in addition to the plot that difference has changed considerably since its original 14 years have passed since the original and the script has changed a lot.

La impostora was set to replace Dama y Obrero in October 2013. But when Telemundo decided to extend Marido en Alquiler into 2 hours, the soap opera was later moved to 14 January 2014.

The soap opera marks the debut of Sebastián Zurita on Telemundo. It is also the first time that Zurita and his real life mother Christian Bach worked together in the series.

The theme song for La impostora is played by Alejandra Guzmán, the single is titled "Para Mí" from her latest album "Primera Fila".

== Cast ==
=== Main ===
- Christian Bach as Raquel Altamira
- Sebastián Zurita as Eduardo Leon Altamira
- Lisette Morelos as Blanca Guerrero / Victoria San Marino "La Impostora"
- Manuel Landeta as Adriano Ferrer
- Armando Silvestre as Don Leónidas Altamira

=== Recurring ===
- Begoña Narváez as Mariana Serrano
- Alpha Acosta as Valentina Altamira / Leticia
- Jonathan Islas as Cristóbal Leon Altamira
- Mauricio Hénao as Jorge Leon Altamira
- Mimi Morales as Karina
- Alberto Pavón as Iván Montenegro
- Eligio Meléndez as Padre Camilo Fernández
- Simone Victoria as Socorro Sánchez
- Paco Mauri as Guillermo "Memo" Guerrero
- René García as Domingo / Peter San Marino
- Eugenio Becker as Salvador Estrada
- Sandra Benhumea as Fernanda García
- Néstor Rodulfo as Rubén Espinoza "El Tuerto"
- Socorro de la Campa as Melania Robles
- Julieta Grajales as Catalina Echeverria
- Mariano Palacios as Diego Echeverría
- Elsa Amezaga as Simona Guerrero
- Edgar Iván Delgado as Ramón Valenzuela
- Arnoldo Picazzo as Clemente Echeverría
- Macarena Oz as Sofía Altamira Serrano
- Ricardo Sevilla as Hugo Guerrero
- Lupita Sandoval as Doña Tita
- Uriel del Toro as Rafael Moreno
- Juan José Pucheta as Arnaldo Madrid
- Mónica Jiménez as Oriana Martínez
- Perla Encinas as Luciana Carrasco
- Rocío Vázquez as Francisca Márquez
- Sam García as Richie Salgado
- Guadalupe Martínez as Ana Castro
- Mossy Santini as Valery

== Awards and nominations ==
Year	Award	Category	Nominated	Result
2014	Premios Tu Mundo			
2014	Premios Tu Mundo	The Best Bad Girl	Christian Bach	Nominated
2014	Premios Tu Mundo	First Actor	Manuel Landeta	Won
2014	Premios Tu Mundo	Junior Favorite Artist	Macarena Oz	Nominated
