= 40 y 20 (TV series) =

- Genre: Comedy
- Created by: Gustavo Loza
- Directed by: Eduardo Clemesha
- Starring: Jorge van Rankin; Mauricio Garza; Michelle Rodríguez; Mónica Huarte; Verónica Jaspeado; Oswaldo Zárate; Armando Hernández; Bruno Loza
- Country of origin: Mexico
- Original language: Spanish
- No. of seasons: 12
- No. of episodes: 148 (list of episodes)

Production
- Executive producer: Gustavo Loza

Original release
- Network: Blim; Las Estrellas; Canal 5
- Release: April 1, 2016 – present

Related
- Oríllese a la orilla

40 y 20 is a Mexican comedy television series produced by Gustavo Loza for Blim. The first season was released on April 1, 2016. The series stars Jorge van Rankin, Mauricio Garza, Michelle Rodríguez, Mónica Huarte, and Verónica Jaspeado. The eleventh season premiered on October 3, 2024. The twelfth season premiered on 1 April 2025, with the series moving to Canal 5.

== Synopsis ==
Divorced Paco and his teenage son Fran navigate through all kinds of entanglements within the typical coexistence of a fun, dysfunctional family of divorce. Both men must deal with their conquests as Paco faces his 40s and Fran faces adolescence. Meanwhile, continuing to resent every step of both, is Rocío, Paco's ex and Fran's mother.

== Cast ==
=== Main ===
- Jorge van Rankin as Paco: the typical manchild who wants to remain young despite being over 40; is why he is attracted to beautiful 20-year-olds. He is Fran's father.
- Mauricio Garza as Fran (seasons 1–8, 11; recurring season 10): the son of Paco and Rocío, a college boy and 20-year-old who likes to sleep with older women.
- Michelle Rodríguez as Toña: Paco's maid, who is more like part of the family.
- Mónica Huarte as Rocío: mother of Fran and ex-wife of Paco; she still holds romantic feels for him although she denies this. (main, seasons 1–2, 5–10; guest seasons 3–4)
- Verónica Jaspeado as Rosario (seasons 3–4): Rocío's sister and Fran's aunt, she is in charge of administration of the building where Paco lives.
- Oswaldo Zárate as Borrego (season 8; recurring seasons 1–7)
- Armando Hernández as Brayan Daniel (seasons 9–; recurring seasons 1–8)
- Bruno Loza as Lucas (seasons 9–)

=== Recurring ===
- Begoña Narváez as Miranda
- Jessica Mas as Lola
- Luis Gatica as Víctor
- Pascacio López as Jair Gabriel
- Natalia Téllez as Montserrat
- Estefanía Ahumada Lama as Macarena
- Natalia Varela as Marijo
- Sophie Alexander as Laura
- Coral Bonelli as Coral
- Itahisa Machado as Karime
- Regina Rojas as Emilia
- Mariana Carvajal as Susana
- Gerardo Taracena as Macedonio
- Nashla Aguilar as Mary
- Katia Bada as Simone

== Episodes ==
Season	Episodes	Originally released		
Season	Episodes	First released	Last released	Network
1	13	April 1, 2016		Blim TV
2	13	December 2, 2016		Blim TV
3	13	August 28, 2017	November 6, 2017	Blim TV
4	13	September 16, 2018	November 25, 2018	Blim TV
5	12	November 20, 2020	December 24, 2020	Las Estrellas
6	12	April 13, 2021	June 29, 2021	Las Estrellas
7	12	September 28, 2021	December 14, 2021	Las Estrellas
8	12	April 26, 2022	July 19, 2022	Las Estrellas
9	12	October 11, 2022	December 27, 2022	Las Estrellas
10	12	October 3, 2023	December 19, 2023	Las Estrellas
11	12	October 3, 2024	December 26, 2024	Las Estrellas
12	12	April 1, 2025	April 9, 2025	Canal 5

== Production ==
In October 2022, the series was renewed for a ninth and tenth season. The ninth season premiered on October 11, 2022. The tenth season premiered on October 3, 2023.

== Awards and nominations ==
Year	Award	Category	Nominated	Result
2017	TVyNovelas Awards	Best Comedy Program	Gustavo Loza	Nominated
2018	TVyNovelas Awards	Best Comedy Program	Gustavo Loza	Nominated
2019	TVyNovelas Awards	Best Comedy Program	Gustavo Loza	Nominated

== Spin-off ==
On 17 October 2023, TelevisaUnivision announced that a spin-off titled Oríllese a la orilla had begun production and would premiere on the streaming service Vix. It would follow Toña and Brayan Daniel joining the police academy after losing their jobs at Paco's condominium. The series premiered on 12 July 2024.
