= Vanessa Terkes =

Peruvian film, television and stage actress

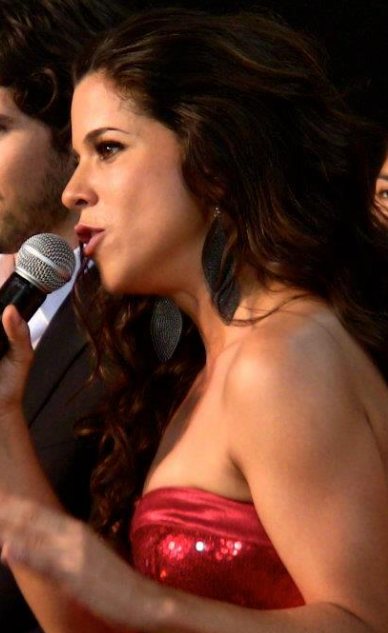
- Born: 3 March 1978 (age 48); Lima, Peru
- Occupation: Actress
- Years active: 1988–present
- Children: Sujetka Val Terkes

Vanessa Cvujetka Terkes Rachitoff (born 3 March 1978) is a Peruvian film, television and stage actress. She is best known for her role in the Mexican television series El Pantera, as Lola.

Terkes became popular in Peru for her roles in soap operas Torbellino and Boulevard Torbellino.

Terkes is of Croatian and Russian descent.

== Filmography ==
=== Television ===
Year	Title	Role	Notes
1988	Cero en conducta	Daniela	
1989	El show de July	Herself	Child cast
1996	La noche	Daniela	
1997	Torbellino	Mariana Carrillo	Main role
1997—1998	Boulevard Torbellino	Mariana Carrillo	Main role
1998—1999	Travesuras del corazón	Mónica Alcalde	
2000	Vidas prestadas	Katy Vigas	
2004—2005	Tormenta de pasiones	Cristina Ángeles	Main role
2006	Decisiones	Various roles	Episode "Trampa para un Don Juan"; Episode "Gata en celo" Episode "La mejor de la venganza" Episode "Una despedida para no olvidar" Episode "El engaño" Episode "De secretaria a espía" Episode "Quién engaña a quién"
2007—2009	El Pantera	Lola	
2010	Fuego cruzado: Vidas extremas	Famous person	1 episode
2011–2017	Como dice el dicho	Various roles	3 episodes
2012	El Gran Show	Contestant	3° place
2012	La Tayson, corazón rebelde	Milagros "La Tayson" / Milagros del Prado	Main role
2016	Simplemente María	Sonia	17 episodes
2017	¡Ay Güey!	Verónica	Main role
2018	Educando a Nina	Magaly	

=== Films ===
Year	Title	Role	Notes
2008	El patio de mi cárcel		
2008	Ojos de fuego	Cristina	
2009	Siete minutos		
2010	Sanguinarios del M1	Tatiana	TV film
2011	Bolero de noche	Gitana	

=== Theatre ===
Year	Title	Role	Notes
1987	Annie	Sonia	
1987	Saltimbanquis		
1988	Capitanes de lata		
1994	Romeo y Julieta	Julieta	
1999	Garabato con botas	Micaela	
2004	The Vagina Monologues	Performer	
2011	Comedia a la carta	Performer	Stand-up comedy
