= Guadalupe Reyes (film) =

- Directed by: Salvador Espinosa
- Screenplay by: Erik Zuckermann; Harald Rumpler; Marcos Bucay
- Starring: Juan Pablo Medina; Martín Altomaro
- Release date: 29 November 2019 (Mexico)
- Country: Mexico
- Language: Spanish

Guadalupe Reyes is a 2019 Mexican comedy film directed by Salvador Espinosa, from a screenplay by Erik Zuckermann, Harald Rumpler, and Marcos Bucay. The film stars Juan Pablo Medina and Martín Altomaro, alongside Begoña Narváez, María de la Fuente, Paco Rueda, Memo Villegas, Salvador Zerboni, Roberto Duarte, Tato Alexander, Juan Carlos Colombo, Ofelia Medina, Mauricio Isaac, Arap Bethke, and Emiliano Zurita. The film premiered on 29 November 2019 in Mexico.

== Plot ==
Hugo just turned forty and reminisces of his youth where he was more unleashed. After ten years, he meets again with his friend Luis, an educated restless business executive, and he tells him to start the "Guadalupe Reyes", a bet they made with themselves many years ago. Luis is initially opposed. He thinks he has found a burglar in the house but it turns out to be an affair as his wife has lost interest in him.

Día de la Virgen de Guadalupe - an annual holiday for Catholic pilgrims visiting Mexico City - is December 12.

Día de los Reyes Magos (Day of the Three Kings) - the traditional end of the Christmas season in Mexico - is January 6.

The challenge involves being extremely wild between these two holidays, hence the name "Guadalupe Reyes." Specifically it involves taking part in risky behavior, such as binge drinking and frequent sex. By the definition of the challenge, no men have previously accomplished it. Luis and Hugo decide to take part in it, despite their ages and careers.

The duo crashes a community theater and is chased from the scene when Hugo, playing Joseph, gets a handjob from a woman playing the Virgin Mary. They continue with their misadventures over the next few days.

Luis slowly lets go of his workaholism and starts drinking and having one-night stands

At a celebration for Las Posadas, the duo brings a large quantity of alcohol only to find that the friend hosting it has since married and had children. Luis, wearing only underwear, puts on an entertaining show with torches, but one slips and burns the family's Christmas tree.

Throughout the film, they live all kinds of adventures and experiences that will test their friendship.

== Cast ==
- Juan Pablo Medina as Hugo
- Martín Altomaro as Luis
- Begoña Narváez
- María de la Fuente
- Paco Rueda
- Memo Villegas
- Salvador Zerboni
- Roberto Duarte
- Tato Alexander
- Juan Carlos Colombo
- Ofelia Medina
- Mauricio Isaac
- Arap Bethke
- Emiliano Zurita
