= Andrés Montiel =

Mexican actor

Andrés Montiel (Spanish pronunciation: [anˈdɾes monˈtjel]), is a Mexican actor born in Guadalajara, Jalisco.

He started acting professionally at age 19, and soon developed solid theatre experience appearing in several plays and notable productions of Hamlet and The Lonesome West. Since year 2001, he began to act in films. He can be seen opposite Gael García Bernal as journalist Ruben in the Academy Award and Golden Globe Award Nominated El crimen del Padre Amaro (The Crime of Father Amaro) and in many other films such as the critically acclaimed Más que a nada en el mundo (More than Anything in the World) and La Zona (2007) (The Zone), awarded the International Critics' Award (FIPRESCI) at the Toronto International Film Festival. Other film participations include Ciudadano Buelna by acclaimed filmmaker Felipe Cazals; the epic Cinco de Mayo: The Battle and Cantinflas.

He was also the recipient of two Best Actor awards for the film "Day Six" in Italy. He recently played leading roles in the films "Monstruosly Alone" and "Broken Souls".

On television, he can be seen on Netflix original series first Spanish production Club de Cuervos, La querida del Centauro for Telemundo, the Mexican hit series Infames and Pancho Villa: El Centauro del Norte

== Filmography ==
=== Film ===
Year	Title	Role	Notes
2022	Almas Rotas	Santiago	
2020	Monstruosly Alone	Santiago	
2017	Día Seis	Joaquin	
2016	El que busca encuentra	Jesus Medina	
2015	El Hotel	Willy	
2015	Las Aparicio	Director	
2014	Cantinflas	Agustin Isunza	
2013	12 Segundos	El Cazador	
2013	Cinco de mayo: La batalla	General Antonio Álvarez	
2013	Ciudadano Buelna	Martín Luis Guzmán	
2012	Morelos	Agustín de Iturbide	
2012	Te Quiero	Reynaldo	
2012	Samurai	The Man	Short film/Co-writer
2011	Cristiada	Florentino Vargas	
2011	Foco Rojo	Rico Campana	Short film
2010	Tlatelolco	Juan Romo	
2010	Der kreis in dem sie reist	Javi	Short film
2010	Desafío	Freddy Balbanera	
2010	Invocación	Matias	Short film
2009	Bala Mordida	News Reporter	
2008	Llamando a un Ángel	Gustavo	
2007	La Zona	Diego	
2007	Blue Eyelids	Man in park	
2006	Más que a nada en el mundo	Mario	
2006	Alta Infidelidad	Manuel	
2005	La Sombra del Sahuaro	Alacran	
2002	The Crime of Father Amaro	Rubén de la Rosa	
2002	Frida	Cachucha	

=== Television ===
Year	Title	Role	Notes
2023	Pancho Villa: El Centauro del Norte	Felipe Ángeles	
2018	Run Coyote Run	Political Advisor	Main cast
2018	La Bella y las Bestias	Omar	Main cast
2017	El César	Salvador Ochoa	Main cast
2016	La querida del Centauro	Felix	Main cast
2015–present	Club de Cuervos	Victor Valdez	
2012	Infames	Emilio Ferreira	Co-star lead
2012	Estado de Gracia	Sánchez	Main cast
2011	El Encanto del Aguila	Gustavo A. Madero	
2010	Bienes Raices	Demian	
2010	Los Minondo	Pedro	
2005	Las Juanas	Gabriel II	Main cast
2003	Clase 406	Eleazar Espinoza	Main cast
2002	American Family	Young Don Leon	
