= El César =

Mexican television series

- Genre: Biographical
- Written by: Alfredo Mendoza
- Directed by: Alfonso Pineda Ulloa; Alejandro Aimetta
- Creative director: Óscar Tapia
- Starring: Armando Hernández
- Music by: Pascual Reyes
- Opening theme: “Arre Cesar” by Molotov
- Country of origin: Mexico
- Original language: Spanish
- No. of seasons: 1
- No. of episodes: 26

Production
- Executive producers: Fernando Barbosa; Leonardo Aranguibel; Francisco Cordero; Ricardo Coeto
- Producer: Mariano Carranco
- Cinematography: Jero Rod-García
- Editor: Camilo Abadía

Original release
- Network: Space
- Release: 18 September – 11 December 2017

El César is a Mexican biographical television series that premiered on Space on 18 September 2017, and concluded on 11 December 2017. Based on the life of legendary Mexican boxer Julio César Chávez. The series is produced by Disney Media Distribution Latin America, Televisión Azteca and BTF Media. It stars Armando Hernández as the titular character.

== Plot ==
The series follows the life of Julio César Chávez (Armando Hernández). For 13 years, 11 months and 14 days, Julio remained undefeated at the height of popular fervor and had everything: family, fame, and legions of followers. Thus Julio acceded to a privileged world that led him to engage with dangerous drug gangs, to hold love affairs with famous TV stars, to rub shoulders with the highest spheres of Mexican political power, and to engage in a whirlwind of alcohol and drug addiction. drugs that would put an end to his career and, almost, to his life. Rehabilitated and active in the middle box.

== Production ==
On February 23, 2017 the start of production of the series was confirmed and officially concluded on May 29, 2017.

== Cast ==
- Armando Hernández as Julio César Chávez
- Marcela Guirado as Amalia Carrasco
- Leticia Huijara as Doña Isabel
- Maya Zapata as Blanca Santiago
- Julio Bracho as Ángel Gutiérrez
- Héctor Bonilla as Hombre del Cigarro
- Ivan Cortés as Zurdo Félix
- Adrian Makala as Mr. King
- Alejandra Toussaint as Maggie
- Sebastián Buitrón as Chuy
- Andrés Montiel as Salvador Ochoa
- Cecilia Suárez as Tía Hilda
- Álvaro Guerrero as José Sulaiman
- Gimena Gómez as Brisa Rafal
- Rosita Pelayo as Soledad Garduño
- Luis Fernando Peña as Macho Camacho
- Enoc Leaño as Rómulo
- María Aura as Sabina
- Alfonso Borbolla as Bruno Casados
- Gustavo Sánchez Parra as Rodolfo
- Luis Alberti as Maiko

== Episodes ==
No.	Title	Directed by	Original release date
1	"A Tijuana"	Alfonso Pineda Ulloa	18 September 2017
Julio, in his eagerness to box and demonstrate that he will be the champion, fights to achieve his goal and overnight has it all.
2	"El primero en la fila"	Alfonso Pineda Ulloa	18 September 2017
Julio's career starts to rise, he is born with the desire to achieve everything, but also the temptations of success come to him.
3	"Nuevos rumbos"	Alfonso Pineda Ulloa	25 September 2017
Julio is at the top of the success, is world champion, changes promoter and begins to surround himself with very important people.
4	"Sabor a fama"	Alfonso Pineda Ulloa	25 September 2017
Julio begins to fall in a life full of excesses, that take him away from his family and without knowing that it is used by his fame.
5	"Poder al poder"	Alfonso Pineda Ulloa	2 October 2017
Julio feels more important to know that the presidential candidate will be in his house, because he needs your help to communicate with the people.
6	"El Embrujo"	Alfonso Pineda Ulloa	2 October 2017
Julio manages to emerge victor in his fight against the Chapo, and shows that neither witchcraft nor provocations stop him once he gets into the ring.
7	"Sírvale Generoso"	Alfonso Pineda Ulloa	9 October 2017
The wastefulness and excesses that Julio has had recently, along with the rest he has decided to take, begin to affect his economy.
8	"Para eso están"	Alfonso Pineda Ulloa	9 October 2017
After having the world at their feet, they all turn their back from day to day for their alleged link with the narco.
9	"Las Esposas"	Alfonso Pineda Ulloa	16 October 2017
Relying once more on Angel, he accepts his proposal and is betrayed again. What unleashes an anger that can not control.
10	"En la cima"	Alfonso Pineda Ulloa	16 October 2017
There are so many pressures Julio feels, that for the first time he is tempted to try the coca, but the attempt does not come as he expects.
11	"Tormenta y tempestad"	Alfonso Pineda Ulloa	23 October 2017
As he started to make his way back to the ring, Julio is discovered and now he will have to explain to Amalia about the daughter he just had with another woman.
12	"Show Business"	Alfonso Pineda Ulloa	23 October 2017
Julio will not allow them to see his face again and demands a fair fight with half of the PPV earnings as payment.
13	"It's macho time"	Alfonso Pineda Ulloa	30 October 2017
Disconsolate and furious at the breakdown of his relationship with Amalia, he feels compelled to succumb to the temptation of cocaine.
14	"Fuego"	Alejandro Aimetta	30 October 2017
To avoid further problems, Julio ends his relationship with Brisa and tries to prove that he is still a good man.
15	"Derrotado"	Alejandro Aimetta	6 November 2017
Julio is out of control and consumed by jealousy, he assaults Amalia for the first time.
16	"Sobredosis"	Alejandro Aimetta	6 November 2017
The great Champion falls for the first time in the ring, and the reconciliation with Amalia helps him not to collapse.
17	"Caída libre"	Alejandro Aimetta	13 November 2017
The false promises of Julio, make him lose his family definitively.
18	"Acorralado"	Alejandro Aimetta	13 November 2017
Julio's career is plummeting and he suffers a terrible defeat against de la Hoya, as a result of the bad decisions he has made.
19	"Sin salida"	Alejandro Aimetta	20 November 2017
When Julio needs the help of the people, they all turn their backs on him and only his true friends, his team, will help him escape from the law.
20	"Blanca Navidad"	Alejandro Aimetta	20 November 2017
Julio regains his freedom and shows them that he is a good man and is willing to recover his life.
21	"Pura moral"	Alejandro Aimetta	27 November 2017
Julio is uncontrollable and the excesses in his life are so many, that they do not allow him to see everything that he is losing.
22	"Tirar la toalla"	Alejandro Aimetta	27 November 2017
Realizing that he has stopped being the great Champion, Julio falls into a depression so deep that he tries to take his own life.
23	"En la esquina"	Alejandro Aimetta	4 December 2017
24	"Infierno"	Alejandro Aimetta	4 December 2017
25	"Morder el suelo"	Alejandro Aimetta	11 December 2017
26	"Ave César"	Alejandro Aimetta	11 December 2017
After having suffered so much, Julio manages to recover with the help of his family and friends and finally he can forgive himself.

== U.S. episodes ==
=== Ratings ===
Viewership and ratings per season of El César
Season	Episodes	First aired		Last aired		Avg. viewers (millions)	18–49 rank
Season	Episodes	Date	Viewers (millions)	Date	Viewers (millions)	Avg. viewers (millions)	18–49 rank
1	13	7 November 2017	1.37	24 November 2017	0.78	0.96	TBD
2	10	23 June 2018	0.57	25 August 2018	0.48	0.42	TBD

=== Season 1 (2017) ===
No. overall	No. in season	Title	Original release date	US viewers (millions)
1	1	"El sueño del César"	7 November 2017	1.37
2	2	"A las puertas de la fama"	8 November 2017	1.03
3	3	"Nuevos rumbos"	9 November 2017	0.98
4	4	"Sabor a fama"	10 November 2017	0.92
5	5	"Poder al poder"	13 November 2017	0.93
6	6	"El embrujo"	14 November 2017	1.05
7	7	"Sírvale generoso"	15 November 2017	1.01
8	8	"Para eso están"	16 November 2017	0.78
9	9	"Las esposas"	17 November 2017	0.87
10	10	"En la cima"	20 November 2017	0.97
11	11	"Tormenta y tempestad"	21 November 2017	0.86
12	12	"Show business"	22 November 2017	0.88
13	13	"It's "Macho" time"	24 November 2017	0.78

=== Season 2 (2018) ===
No. overall	No. in season	Title	Original release date	US viewers (millions)
14	1	"El César no firma el divorcio"	23 June 2018	0.57
15	2	"Amalia está embarazada"	30 June 2018	0.43
16	3	"Cacho pierde el invicto"	7 July 2018	0.51
17	4	"Sorprenden a Cacho con otra"	14 July 2018	0.44
18	5	"De La Hoya derrota a Chávez"	21 July 2018	0.34
19	6	"Orden de arresto contra Chávez"	28 July 2018	0.37
20	7	"Quitan los cargos contra Cacho"	4 August 2018	0.34
21	8	"Chávez intenta suicidarse"	11 August 2018	0.37
22	9	"Chávez sufre humillaciones"	18 August 2018	0.30
23	10	"César Chávez es una leyenda"	25 August 2018	0.48

=== U.S. special ===
Title	Original release date	US viewers (millions)
"Julio César Chávez: Sin filtro"	7 November 2017	1.31
A special held in Tijuana, Mexico, where Julio César Chávez talks about his career, his family, his failures and learning.

== Awards and nominations ==
Year	Award	Category	Nominated	Result
2017	TV Adicto Golden Awards	Best Premiere Bioseries on Pay Television	El César	Won
2018	MTV Millennial Awards	Killer Serie	El César	Nominated
