= Michelle Rodríguez (Mexican actress) =

Mexican actress

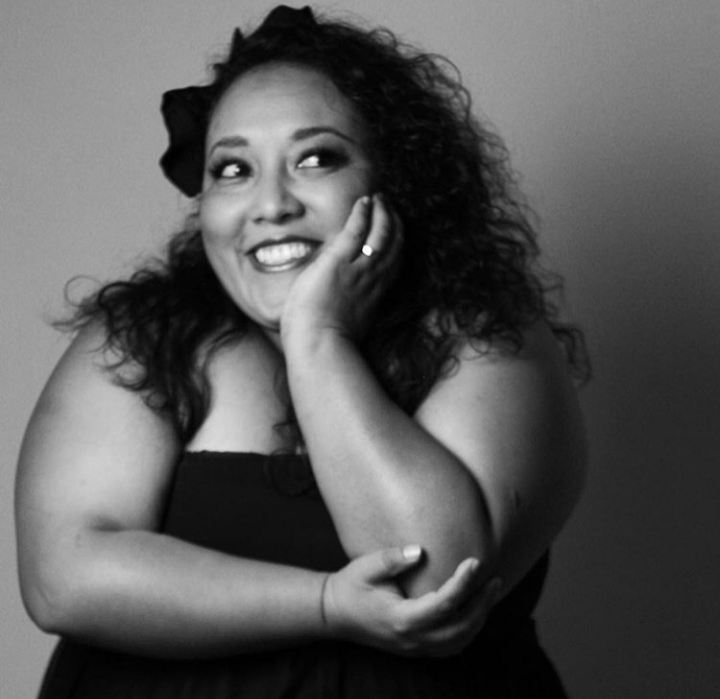
- Michelle Rodríguez
- Born: Xochimilco, Mexico
- Occupations: Actress, singer and comedian

Michelle Rodríguez is a Mexican actress, singer and comedian who performs in films, theatre and television. She is known for playing the character of Toña in the television series 40 y 20.

== Biography ==
Born in Xochimilco, she wanted to become an actress and comedian from a young age, however opted to study visual communication and design at National Autonomous University of Mexico (UNAM).

She has been active in the entertainment industry since 1999, beginning with studying dubbing, voiceover and radio production, before training in comedy, musical theatre, improv theatre and acting.

Her television debut came in 2012 with the successful telenovela Amores verdaderos, where she played as the friendly character of "Polita", co-starring with actors such as Erika Buenfil, Eduardo Yáñez, Sebastián Rulli and Eiza González, and also provided distinctive voice acting to the show.

In 2016 she joined the main cast of the comedy series 40 y 20 where she plays Toña, sharing scenes with Jorge van Rankin and Mauricio Garza.

== Filmography ==
=== Television ===
Year	Title	Character	Notes
2012-2013	Amores verdaderos	Policarpia "Polita" López	Recurring character
2013	Qué pobres tan ricos	Admiradora de Tizoc	Guest, 2 episodes
2014-2021	Me caigo de risa	Herself	Cast Member
2014	Mi corazón es tuyo	Falsa Ana Leal	Special Guest
2015-2016	La rosa de Guadalupe	Juanita Aurora Catita	Episode: "Una carta de amor" Episode: "La última flor del asfalto" Episode: "Un castillo de amor"
2015-2016	Comedy Central Presenta: Stand up	Herself	Special guest; 2 episodes
2016	Nosotros los guapos	Vendedora en Xochimilco	Guest; 1 episode
2016-present	40 y 20	Refugio Lorenza Antonia "Toña"	Main role
2017	El Bienamado	Estrella	Recurring role
2017-2018	Run Coyote Run	Rubí	Guest; 1 episode
2018	LOL: Last One Laughing	Herself	Recurring guest; 6 episodes
2019	¿Quién es la máscara?	Monstruo	Season 1
2019	Julia vs. Julia	Patient	Guest; 1 episode
2019	Noches con Platanito	Herself	Special guest
2020	La culpa es de la Malinche	Herself	Host
2022	Tal para cual	Refugio Lorenza Antonia "Toña"	Episode: "Juntos pero no revueltos"
2024	Oríllese a la orilla	Refugio Lorenza Antonia "Toña"	Main role

=== Film ===
Year	Title	Character	Notes
2017	Fausto	Unknown Character	
2017	Cómo cortar a tu patán	Martita	
2019	Mirreyes vs Godínez	Goyita	
2019	Emma	Betty's mother	
2020	I Carry You with Me	Sandra	
2020	Dolittle	Ginko	Voice role; Spanish dubbing
2020	Trolls World Tour	Delta Dawn	Voice role; Spanish dubbing
2020	Sin hijos	Sonia	
2021	Guerra de likes	Melissa	
2022	Mirreyes contra Godínez 2: El retiro	Goyita	
2025	Mirreyes contra Godínez: Las Vegas	Goyita	

== Awards and nominations ==
=== Premios Ariel ===
Year	Category	Film	Result	Ref.
2021	Best Supporting Actress	Te llevo conmigo	Nominated	
