= Pancho Villa: El Centauro del Norte =

Spanish-Mexican television series

- Pancho Villa: El Centauro del Norte
- Genre: Historical drama
- Created by: Rafael Lara; Enrique Rentería
- Based on: Life of Pancho Villa; Mexico (1910–1920)
- Directed by: Ricardo Coeto; Francisco Cordero; Ivonne Niño; Ivonne Vela; Leonardo Aranguibel; Fernando Barbosa; Mariana Pérez
- Starring: Jorge A. Jiménez; Juan Luis Medina; Armando Hernández; Leonardo Alonso; Marco Treviño; Pablo Abitia; Andrés Montiel; Dagoberto Gama
- Country of origin: Mexico
- Original language: Spanish
- No. of episodes: 10

Production
- Running time: 40 minutes
- Production company: BTF Media

Original release
- Network: Star+ Azteca 7
- Release: 19 July 2023

Pancho Villa: El Centauro del Norte (Pancho Villa: The Centaur of the North) is a Mexican television biographical series produced by BTF Media for Star+. The series dates to the life and death of Mexican revolutionary Francisco "Pancho" Villa and the Mexican Revolution, and was released on June 19, 2023, with 10 episodes.

It stars Jorge A. Jiménez as Pancho Villa and Armando Hernández as Tomás Urbina.

The series premiered on July 21 on the Mexican linear television channel Azteca 7.

== Cast ==
- Jorge A. Jiménez as Pancho Villa
- Juan Luis Medina as Carlos Jáuregui
- Armando Hernández as Tomás Urbina
- Leonardo Alonso as Rodolfo Fierro
- Marco Treviño as Venustiano Carranza
- Antonio Montiel as Felipe Ángeles
- Pablo Abitia as Raúl Madero
- Dagoberto Gama as Victoriano Huerta
- Gabriela Cartol as Lucita
- Iván Arana as Álvaro Obregón
- Jesús Delgado Sánchez as Hipólito Villa
- Constanza Andrade as Elisa Griensen
