= Begoña Narváez =

Mexican actress and model

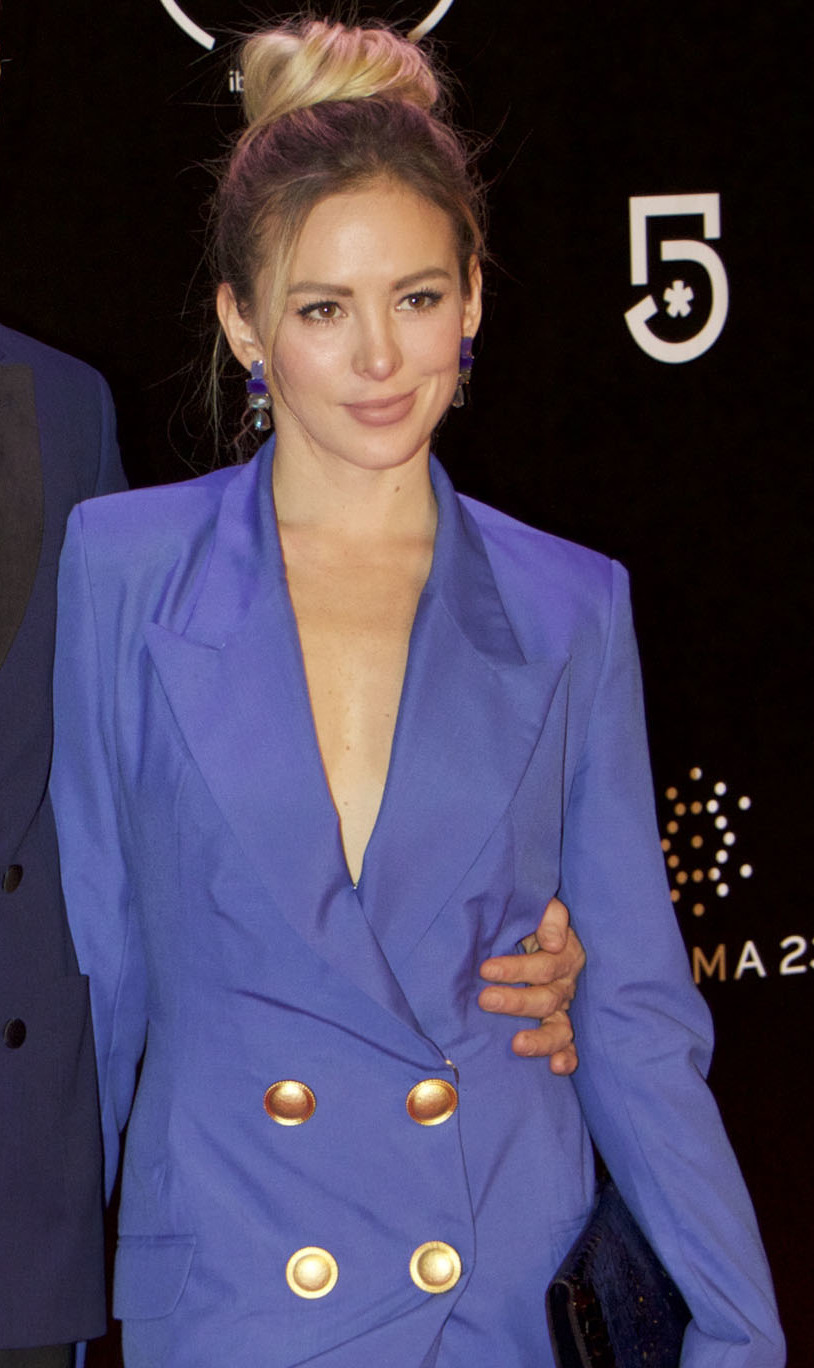
- Narváez in 2018
- Born: Begoña Narváez; July 11, 1987 (age 39); Guadalajara, Jalisco, Mexico
- Occupations: Actress; model

Begoña Narváez (born July 11, 1987), is a Mexican actress and model.

== Career ==
At 16 years old she joined Televisa's Centro de Educación Artística (CEA), one of Mexico's top acting schools. At the age of 19, Begoña Narváez made her debut as Isabel Flores in "Muchachitas como tú" (Teenage Girls Like You). It was a new version of the 1991 version produced by Emilio Larrosa. Muchachitas como tú was not the only telenovela Narváez has done Código Postal (Postcode) as Amy Adams, the girlfriend of Rafael Puentes. In 2010, Narváez played Marissa in "Zacatillo, un lugar en tu corazón" (Zacatillo: A New Beginning). Narváez played three different characters in La rosa de Guadalupe: Bibiana (in 2008), Jackie (in 2008) and Selma (in 2011). Narváez made her debut in American film From Prada to Nada. In 2012, she played in Mexican drama, Facenet as Paulina. Also, in 2012 Narváez played Barbara Montenegro in Rosa Diamante. As Barbara Montenegro, she played a vain woman in love with a man who constantly cheated on her but she was determined to keep him at all costs. Narváez played Lety in a Mexican romance entitled Me Late Chocolate. She can be seen in the upcoming Telemundo series La Impostora as Mariana Serrano.

== Filmography ==
Film roles
Year	Title	Roles	Notes
2011	From Prada to Nada	Carry Sullivan	
2012	Facenet	Paulina	
2013	Me late chocolate	Lety	
2018	Sacúdete las penas	Eva	
2019	Guadalupe Reyes		

Television roles
Year	Title	Roles	Notes
2006	Código postal	Amy Adams	Recurring role; 18 episodes
2007	Muchachitas como tú	Isabel Flores Santos	Recurring role
2008–2011	La rosa de Guadalupe	Various roles	7 episodes
2010	Zacatillo, un lugar en tu corazón	Marissa	Recurring role
2012–2013	Rosa diamante	Bárbara Montenegro	Series regular
2014	La impostora	Mariana Serrano	Series regular; 113 episodes
2015	Club de Cuervos	Ana Paola	2 epuisodes
2016–present	40 y 20	Miranda	Recurring role
2017	La Fan	Jessica González	Series regular; 125 episodes
2018	Run Coyote Run	Tania	Episode: "El principio del fin"
2019	Cita a ciegas	Berenice	Series regular
2019	Rosario Tijeras	Martina	Recurring role
2022	Diario de un gigoló	Florencia	
2024	El Conde: Amor y honor	Margarita	
