= Salvador Espinosa =

Mexican film maker

Salvador Espinosa Orozco
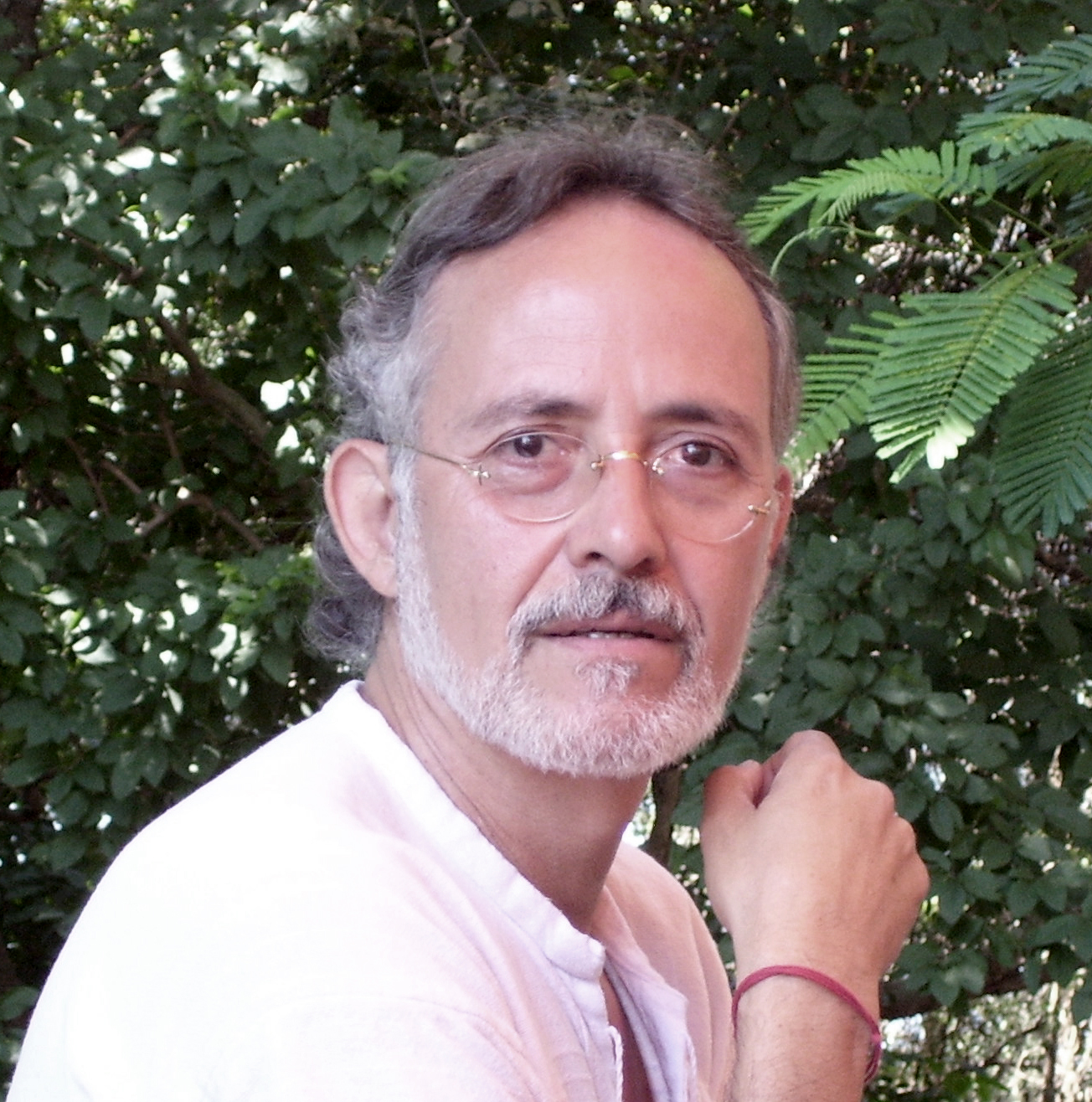
- Salvador Espinosa Orozco
- Born: 1956 (age 69–70); Mexico City, Mexico
- Occupations: Director, engineer

Salvador Espinosa (born 8 February 1956) is a film maker.

He is the director of the documentary TEOKARI (Compañero de Camino - Companion on the Path - 2014).
