= El Pantera =

- Genre: Drama
- Written by: Enrique Rentería; Alfredo Félix Díaz
- Directed by: Alejandro Gamboa; Gustavo Loza
- Starring: Luis Roberto Guzmán
- Theme music composer: J. Baez
- Opening theme: El Pantera "Anagrama"
- Country of origin: Mexico
- Original language: Spanish
- No. of seasons: 3
- No. of episodes: 43

Production
- Executive producers: Rodolfo De Anda G.; Alexis Ayala P.
- Producers: Beatriz Girón O.; Andrea Salas
- Production companies: Televisa; Fox Television Studios

Original release
- Network: Canal 5
- Release: May 14, 2007 – November 26, 2009

El Pantera (English: The Panther) is a Mexican television series that aired on Canal 5 from May 14, 2007 to November 26, 2009. It is based on a comic book of the same name. It narrates the life of Gervasio, a young man who fights crime in Mexico City. The title role is performed by Luis Roberto Guzmán.

The character of El Pantera was created in the 1970s by the writer Daniel Muñoz and artist Juan Alba for Grupo Editorial Vid. A novel called El Pantera, or La Noche del Pantera was written by Muñoz in the 1990s, followed by El Misterio de la Amenaza Negra.

== Plot ==
Gervasio Robles Villa, son of a white man and a Oaxacan Indian woman, is imprisoned for assassinating his fiancée, a crime that he did not commit. During the time he was in jail, he learned Wushu from a mysterious man called "El Indio" (a Native American convicted for tax evasion). The Main General of the police, Porfirio Ayala, convinced of Villa's innocence, decides to release him and return him the life he was taken from. Nevertheless, this act of kindness is conditional. Gervasio will be able to remain free under one condition: he must work secretly with the police and to catch criminals who inhabit the city. Now, El Pantera must find himself, recover his life and discover what his destiny is, to be known as "The Panther". Once in the city he meets a beautiful woman named Lola. Despite the fact that Lola has a past that not every woman would be proud of El Pantera falls in love with her.

In the 2nd Season, El Pantera must confront a new truth, that his girlfriend Rosaura was not killed, but faked her death in order to ascend to the title of "Reina del Narco" loosely translated as "Queen of the Drugtrade", as daughter of "El Rubio Barrios" she was in charge of running the Gulf Drug Cartel. El Pantera then must fight against Police, the Mexican Army, the Pacific Cartel, Korean Mafias and the DEA to save the woman he still loves from torture, death, and even her own ambition.

== Cast ==
=== Main ===
- Luis Roberto Guzmán as Gervasio/El Pantera
- Ignacio López Tarso as General Porfirio Ayala
- Alicia Machado as Diana (season 1)
- Raul Padilla "Choforo" as El Gorda
- Vanessa Terkes as Lola
- Miguel Pizarro as El Curro (season 1)
- Jessica Mas as Ángeles (season 1)
- Opi Domínguez as Artemisa

=== Recurring ===
- Gerardo Taracena as El Mandril
- Javier Escobar as Tereso
- Vanessa Mateo as Lolet
- Cristina Bernal as Lolet
- Fernanda López as Fernanda
- María Rocio García as Lolet
- Oscar Bonfiglio as Godinez
- Andrés García as El Rubio Barrios
- Irán Castillo as Rosaura
- Luis Gatica as El Procurador
- Issabela Camil as Virginia
- Luis Couturier as El Secretario de Defensa Alconedo
- Rodolfo de Anda as Santos
- Isela Vega as Procuradora
- Salvador Zerboni as Gabriel
- Alexis Ayala as Comandante Orozco
- Ximena Herrera as La Reina
- Fidel Zerda as Ausencio
- Roxana Rojo de la Vega as Paulina
- Thaily Amezcua as Mayra
- Nancy Taira as Ana
- Lila Aviles as Raquel
- Alessy as Sofía
- Krizia as Camila
- Joss as Brenda

== Episodes ==
=== Series overview ===
Season	Episodes	Originally released	
Season	Episodes	First released	Last released
1	13	May 14, 2007	August 6, 2007
2	13	May 5, 2008	July 26, 2008
3	17	August 6, 2009	November 26, 2009

=== Season 1 (2007) ===
No. overall	No. in season	Title	Written by	Original release date
1	1	"Regreso a casa"	Alfredo Félix Díaz & Olga de la Fuente	May 14, 2007
2	2	"Prestamistas"	Alfredo Félix Díaz & Olga de la Fuente	May 21, 2007
3	3	"Hoteles del centro"	Ángel Pulido & Olga de la Fuente	May 28, 2007
4	4	"Pirañas de asfalto"	Gilberto de Anda	June 4, 2007
5	5	"La monja"	Enrique Rentería	June 11, 2007
6	6	"Call girls"	Ángel Pulido	June 18, 2007
7	7	"Loco yo"	Enrique Rentería	June 25, 2007
8	8	"Madre Rusia"	Enrique Rentería	July 2, 2007
9	9	"Confianza rota"	Enrique Rentería	July 9, 2007
10	10	"Rabia"	Enrique Rentería	July 16, 2007
11	11	"Jaulas"	Enrique Rentería	July 23, 2007
12	12	"Desencuentro"	Enrique Rentería	July 30, 2007
13	13	"Revelaciones"	Enrique Rentería	August 6, 2007

=== Season 2 (2008) ===
No. overall	No. in season	Title	Original release date
14	1	"El imperio de la reina"	May 5, 2008
15	2	"La cruzada"	May 12, 2008
16	3	"La última función"	May 19, 2008
17	4	"Salvar al enemigo"	May 26, 2008
18	5	"Asuntos de familia"	June 2, 2008
19	6	"Cara a cara"	June 9, 2008
20	7	"Por los viejos tiempos"	June 16, 2008
21	8	"Padre e hija"	June 23, 2008
22	9	"Alianza"	June 30, 2008
23	10	"Danza mortal"	July 7, 2008
24	11	"El mundo es un negocio"	July 14, 2008
25	12	"Feliz cumpleaños"	July 21, 2008
26	13	"La traición"	July 28, 2008

=== Season 3 (2009) ===
No. overall	No. in season	Title	Original release date
27	1	"Jaque a la reina"	August 6, 2009
28	2	"Nirvana: parte 1"	August 13, 2009
29	3	"Nirvana: parte 2"	August 20, 2009
30	4	"Muerte al general"	August 27, 2009
31	5	"Viene el coco"	September 3, 2009
32	6	"Cosecha de amapolas"	September 10, 2009
33	7	"Servicios de internet"	September 17, 2009
34	8	"Arte"	September 24, 2009
35	9	"Túneles"	October 1, 2009
36	10	"El día de la bestia"	October 8, 2009
37	11	"Las bellas y la bestia I"	October 15, 2009
38	12	"Las bellas y la bestia II"	October 22, 2009
39	13	"La noche de la bestia"	October 29, 2009
40	14	"Persecución a primera vista"	November 5, 2009
41	15	"40 horas para morir"	November 12, 2009
42	16	"Nunca digas nunca"	November 19, 2009
43	17	"El intercambio"	November 26, 2009
