= Armando Hernández (actor) =

Mexican television and film actor (born 1982)

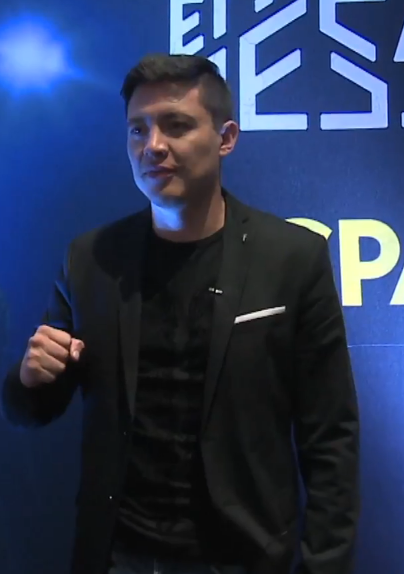
- Hernández in the presentation of the series El César
- Born: September 27, 1982 (age 44)
- Occupation: Actor
- Years active: 2001–present

Armando Hernández (born September 27, 1982) is a Mexican television and film actor. He is well known for his main role in El César as Julio César Chávez.

== Filmography ==
=== Film ===
Year	Title	Role	Notes
2001	De la calle	Cero	
2002	Amar te duele	Genaro	
2003	Ladies' Night	Chavo Corneta	
2006	Sexo, amor y otras perversiones	Esteban	Segment: "El Auto"
2006	Fuera del cielo	Cucú	
2006	Una película de huevos	Additional Voices	Voice role
2006	Fast Food Nation	Roberto	
2007	Padre nuestro	Juan	
2007	El búfalo de la noche	Beto	
2007	Cañitas, presencia	Carlos Trejo	
2008	La sorpresa	Tomás	
2008	La voladora	Arizona	
2008	Rudo y Cursi	Cienpiés	
2009	Sentenciados	El heredero	
2010	Amaneceres oxidados	Alejandro	
2010	Año bisiesto	Hombre 3	
2010	Te presento a Laura	Meme	
2012	El Shakka	Atila	
2012	Ciegas, sordas y divorciadas	Renzo	
2012	Colosio: El asesinato	Agustín	
2013	Vía Láctea	Marte	Short film
2013	Ladies Nice	Germán	
2013	Tlatelolco, verano del 68	Paco	
2014	Las oscuras primaveras	Vendedor	
2014	Heriberto y Demetrio	Demetrio	
2015	24° 51' Latitud Norte	Ernie	Short film
2016	Compadres	Payaso	
2016	¿Qué culpa tiene el niño?	Taxista	
2018	El día de la unión	Javier	
2022	The Valet	Rudy	

=== Television ===
Year	Title	Role	Notes
2003	Clase 406	Cipriano Goytisolo / El Alebrije	2 episodes
2004	Mujer, casos de la vida real	Various	2 episodes
2004	Rebelde	Unknown role	1 episode
2005–2006	Vecinos	Caguamo	3 episodes
2008	Mujeres asesinas	Juan Rascón	Episode: "Margarita, ponsoñoza"
2008–2010	Capadocia	Joel Miranda	9 episodes
2009	El Pantera	Maco	4 episodes
2010–2011	Los héroes del norte	El Faquir	5 episodes
2011	El encanto del águila	Lázaro Cárdenas	Episode: "El último Caudillo"
2013	Como dice el dicho	Giovanni	Episode: "No hay rosas sin espinas"
2014–2016	Sr. Ávila	Claudio Juárez Jr.	4 episodes
2016	Drunk History	Ignacio Allende	Episode: "Yerno Incómodo, Trotsky en México, Hidalgo contra Allende"
2016–2023	40 y 20	Brayan Danielle	Recurring (seasons 1–8); Main (season 9)
2017	Sincronía	Joaquín	4 episodes
2017	El César	Julio César Chávez	Main role
2018	Enemigo íntimo	Colmillo	
2018–2019	Señora Acero	Yerbatero	Recurring role (season 5); 51 episodes
2022	Repatriated	Trejo	
2023	Pancho Villa: The Centaur of the North	Tomás Urbina	
2024	Oríllese a la orilla	Brayan Danielle	Main role
2024	¿Quién es la máscara?	Freddie Verdury	Season 6 winner
2025	Unspeakable Sins	El Magic	
