= Relatos macabrones =

- Genre: Sketch comedy
- Created by: Freddy Ortega; Germán Ortega
- Directed by: Freddy Ortega; Germán Ortega
- Starring: Freddy Ortega; Germán Ortega
- Country of origin: Mexico
- Original language: Spanish
- No. of seasons: 7
- No. of episodes: 96

Production
- Executive producers: Charlie Sánchez; Freddy Ortega; Nazareno Pérez Brancatto
- Producer: Ricardo Ferrer
- Production company: TelevisaUnivision

Original release
- Network: Las Estrellas
- Release: 31 August 2020 – 29 December 2023

Relatos macabrones is a Mexican sketch comedy series that premiered on Las Estrellas on 31 August 2020. It stars Freddy Ortega and Germán Ortega. Production of the series began on 15 June 2020. Each episode is composed of three sketches that revolve around horror stories, with a dose of humor told by Frank and Igor.

The seventh and final season premiered on 6 October 2023.

== Cast ==
=== Main ===
- Freddy Ortega as Frank
- Germán Ortega as Igor

=== Recurring ===
- Melissa Ortega
- Marcos Radosh
- Lenny Zundel
- Claudio Herrera as Cuico
- Jocelin Zuckerman
- Nora Velázquez

== Episodes ==
=== Series overview ===
Series	Episodes	Originally released	
Series	Episodes	First released	Last released
1	16	31 August 2020	13 November 2020
2	12	16 April 2021	2 July 2021
3	20	1 October 2021	22 April 2022
4	12	29 April 2022	22 July 2022
5	12	14 October 2022	30 December 2022
6	12	21 April 2023	7 July 2023
7	12	6 October 2023	29 December 2023

=== Season 1 (2020) ===
No. overall	No. in season	Title	Original release date
1	1	"El hipnotizador, el mismo vestido y el Godín"	31 August 2020
Frank and Igor meet again after many years and they tell three stories: A hypnotist uses his gifts for his own benefit; a very special dress can be a tragedy; the life of an office worker.
2	2	"La Llorona maldita, el Sancho y Glu Glu Demon"	4 September 2020
Everyone has heard the story of La Llorona, but now she is a professional; The Sancho and Glu Glu Demon have a very special enemy.
3	3	"Las cocineras, el robot, la torre de control y el insomnio"	7 September 2020
Jitomata and Perejila cook in this episode, where excess technology in a restaurant can be fatal as well as following the indications of a cursed control tower.
4	4	"Terapia de conversión, El Abominable hombre de las nieves y La Nana Macabrona"	11 September 2020
A father wants to transform his son; snows that cause a strange effect; a lullaby of terror.
5	5	"Quesadilla de la calle del infierno, el noticiero y el proyecto influencer"	14 September 2020
A lady offers garnachas of strange origin at her stand; a macabre newscast makes a viewer believe that karma exists; a daring influencer shows the most absurd challenges.
6	6	"El limosnero, El médium y El necio Macabrón"	18 September 2020
Lisset faces a beggar and a medium; Arath de la Torre meets the boy who sold plums.
7	7	"El Exorcista, la casa embrujada tóxica y el Jalo Jalo"	21 September 2020
Lisardo participates in a parody of the Exorcist and meets a man who cannot say no; Sussy Lu lives spooky experiences in a haunted house.
8	8	"El Baño, La Sabrosa y El Pollito asesino Macabrones"	25 September 2020
Aylín Mujica is a woman that everyone wants to be with; a unique murderer, and even a macabre burial.
9	9	"El Interrogatorio, la telenovela y el enmascarado"	28 September 2020
A clever suspect who uses memes to evade justice is interrogated; A parody of Mexican soap operas in the style of Mascabrothers with Erika Buenfil.
10	10	"El Pasillo, El Mago, Los Pendientes Secretos X y La Pedida de Mano Macabrones"	2 October 2020
Alfredo Adame becomes Carlos Tejo, El Panzafantasmas; meet ‘Mago-Sero’; a Martian has contact with an Earthling; and Lorena Velázquez and Carmen Salinas are macabre consuegras.
11	11	"El Cuento de hadas, Jack ‘El Depilador’ y la Exnovia Macabrona"	9 October 2020
A princess gets left behind; a ghoulish hair remover; an ex-girlfriend with almost no grudges.
12	12	"El engaño, el negrote de whatsapp y el vampiro standupero"	16 October 2020
A whatsapp message complicates Fulgencio's wedding night and a vampire appears every night to do standup comedy.
13	13	"El arca de Fermín, el secuestro y los zapatos verdes"	23 October 2020
Fermín builds an ark for the flood; Carlos Espejel tries to save Rosales from a kidnapping and a man wearing macabre green shoes that his wife gave him.
14	14	"Micro machismo, la cadena de internet y el cumpleaños"	30 October 2020
Sergio Basáñez participates in the story of a woman who detects micro machisms; a macabre internet chain; a girl discovers that she is a witch on her birthday.
15	15	"La conferencia de prensa, el tatuador, fiestas patrias y el esquizofrénico"	6 November 2020
A lecturer who the press will not even talk about; a tattoo artist ruins the back of a client; a foreigner celebrates on September 15; a macabre schizophrenic.
16	16	"La chancla, la novia y El Día de las madres macabrón"	13 November 2020
Wendy Braga will have to deal with a flip-flop possessed by her mother-in-law; Carmen Salinas becomes Raquel Pankowsky's daughter-in-law; a woman will have the worst Mother's Day.

=== Season 2 (2021) ===
No. overall	No. in season	Title	Original release date
17	1	"El hombre lobo de Ecatepec, El Esquizofrénico y La conferencia de prensa macabrones"	16 April 2021
Lambda García and Alfredo Adame guest star in terrifying sketches related to cinema.
18	2	"La Llamada telefónica, El Buleado y El muñeco de ventrílocuo macabrones"	23 April 2021
Lisset, Lisardo and El Cibernético participate in the first Macabrones story of the episode.
19	3	"Cena de Año Nuevo, Un Deseo y Los Mirreyes Magos macabrones"	30 April 2021
Alexis Ayala and Fernanda López participate in one of the sketches related to pastorelas, trends and the New Year.
20	4	"Los Celos, El Médium y El Hipnotizador Alcohólico macabrones"	7 May 2021
Ninel Conde participates in these skits that talk about spirits that instead of heaven, go to hell.
21	5	"La Pareja que se complementa, El Infiel y El Goyo macabrones"	14 May 2021
Estefano's new love hides something from him that will make him lose more than his heart; an unfaithful man tries to change for his wife; an old woman is shocked by hiring Goyo's services.
22	6	"La ofrenda, El Experimento y El Charro negro que se vestía de blanco macabrones"	21 May 2021
Lourdes Munguía prepares an offering for her husband; for the first time Frank and Igor have their own story; Kalimba makes his comedy debut.
23	7	"Cuchi Flex, Coolonymus y El secuestro aéreo macabrón"	28 May 2021
The Macabrothers will make an excellent recommendation for a kitchen; a group of hackers will make shocking revelations; Luis Fernando Peña will suffer the hijacking of a plane.
24	8	"La Engañadora, La Entrevista de trabajo y La niña que tenía un monstruo en su racámara macabrones"	4 June 2021
A man gets the job of his dreams after a macabre interview, he meets the macabre monster that lives in the bedroom of a sweet girl.
25	9	"El Hipnotizador que pidió prestado, El asalto y El necio macabrones"	11 June 2021
The hypnotist Nico Tina uses his gifts to run a business at the bank; a supermarket is robbed by some naive criminals; a sick man seeks to enter a store.
26	10	"Los Cuernos y Fermín y Eva macabrones"	18 June 2021
Dorismar becomes an unfaithful wife, while Wendy Braga plays Eva in a skit.
27	11	"Quítale la chamba a Frank"	25 June 2021
Igor and El Cuico do casting to find Frank's replacement by telling new stories.
28	12	"Confesiones que sorprenden"	2 July 2021
El Cuico and El Bisco finally meet and Frank will tell them three different stories.

=== Season 3 (2021–22) ===
No. overall	No. in season	Title	Original release date
29	1	"La terapia de pareja, Las cajeras del súper y Las risas grabadas macabrones"	1 October 2021
30	2	"El quirófano, El secuestro y El heladero que ahora vende paletas macabrones"	8 October 2021
31	3	"El árbol de la sabiduría, El mini super y El hombre que veía al covid macabrones"	15 October 2021
32	4	"El ratón de los dientes y El precio de la historia diabólico macabrones"	22 October 2021
33	5	"El esquizofránico y El necio macabrones"	29 October 2021
34	6	"Igor es reemplazado"	5 November 2021
35	7	"El cafecito macabrón"	12 November 2021
36	8	"El karma y Fermín"	19 November 2021
37	9	"El árbol de Navidad macabrón"	26 November 2021
38	10	"El club de los infieles y Manuela 69"	3 December 2021
39	11	"Cepill IT y El Huesón macabrón"	10 December 2021
40	12	"El hospital macabrón y El hombre manos de papel"	17 December 2021
41	13	"El jorobado de la ópera, el asalto macabrón, y la cita a ciegas en el metro"	25 March 2022
42	14	"El nigromante de la tele"	1 April 2022
43	15	"Las clases en línea y el necio macabrón"	4 April 2022
44	16	"Calcetinflex, una maravilla"	8 April 2022
45	17	"El Canicas macabrón"	11 April 2022
46	18	"La confusión macabrona"	15 April 2022
47	19	"El amor con Bimbolo Bimbolo"	18 April 2022
48	20	"Home office y Mago Cero macabrón"	22 April 2022

=== Season 4 (2022) ===
No. overall	No. in season	Title	Original release date
49	1	"El cementerio de las estatuas fallidas"	29 April 2022
50	2	"La burocracia macabrona"	6 May 2022
51	3	"Cuico está deprimido"	13 May 2022
52	4	"Párale mi cuate"	20 May 2022
53	5	"Los infomerciales macabrones"	27 May 2022
54	6	"El multiverso macabrón"	3 June 2022
55	7	"Hermanos macabrones"	10 June 2022
56	8	"El Doctor Jekill y Míster Haibol"	17 June 2022
57	9	"La estación de policía macabrona"	24 June 2022
58	10	"El impuntual, los halcones y los muñecos de ventrílocuo macabrones"	8 July 2022
59	11	"El primer viaje mexicano a la luna macabrón"	15 July 2022
60	12	"Cine de oro mexicano macabrón"	22 July 2022

=== Season 5 (2022) ===
No. overall	No. in season	Title	Original release date
61	1	"La historia real de terror macabrona"	14 October 2022
62	2	"Las apps macabronas"	21 October 2022
63	3	"La quesadillera del infierno 2"	28 October 2022
64	4	"De Relatos Macabrones para el mundo"	4 November 2022
65	5	"La Boda macabrona"	11 November 2022
66	6	"Consejos de fútbol de la Chatis Rivadeneyra"	18 November 2022
67	7	"Lento y tranquilo o Rápido y jarioso"	25 November 2022
68	8	"El museo de la infamia"	2 December 2022
69	9	"Realities macabrones"	9 December 2022
70	10	"Las jugadoras de pokar macabronas"	16 December 2022
71	11	"Motivaciones macabronas"	23 December 2022
72	12	"Los hermanos macabrones"	30 December 2022

=== Season 6 (2023) ===
No. overall	No. in season	Title	Original release date
73	1	"Igor no paga impuestos y embargan 'Relatos Macabrones'"	21 April 2023
74	2	"Igor busca a su mamá, mascotas macabronas y jaiboles"	28 April 2023
75	3	"Maestros karatecas macabrones"	5 May 2023
76	4	"El diván de los monstruos y el clóset macabrón"	12 May 2023
77	5	"La máquina del tiempo macabrona"	19 May 2023
78	6	"El Quijote que se mancha macabrón"	26 May 2023
79	7	"El Godín y el productor de tragedias"	2 June 2023
80	8	"La Grafóloga macabrona"	9 June 2023
81	9	"El coach macabrón de contenidos modernos"	16 June 2023
82	10	"El repartidor de comedia macabrón"	23 June 2023
83	11	"La productora de cine macabrón"	30 June 2023
84	12	"Igor encuentra a Inga, su madre"	7 July 2023

=== Season 7 (2023) ===
No. overall	No. in season	Title	Original release date
85	1	"¡Feliz Año Nuevo!"	6 October 2023
86	2	"¡Vuela alto, amigo!"	13 October 2023
87	3	"¿Dónde está El Cuico?"	20 October 2023
88	4	"En pro de la ciencia"	27 October 2023
89	5	"Las historias más fumadas de Halloween"	3 November 2023
90	6	"¡Viva la quinceañera!"	10 November 2023
91	7	"Miren al cielo"	17 November 2023
92	8	"Mi casa es su casa"	24 November 2023
93	9	"Frank está inspirado"	1 December 2023
94	10	"Jean Paul está enamorado"	8 December 2023
95	11	"La mano de dios"	22 December 2023
96	12	"Duérmete, mi niño"	29 December 2023
