= Güey =

Mexican colloquialism

Güey (Spanish pronunciation: [ˈwej]; WAY; also spelled guey, wey or we) is a word in colloquial Mexican Spanish that is commonly used to refer to any person without using their name. Though typically (and originally) applied only to males, it can also be used for females (although when using slang, women would more commonly refer to another woman as "chava" [young woman] or "vieja" [old lady]). It is used roughly the same as "dude" in modern American English. It is derived from the term buey, meaning ox. It was used to insult men as cuckolds, because oxen are slow, castrated bulls. Over time, the initial /b/ underwent a consonant mutation to a /g/, often elided, resulting in the modern pronunciation "wey". The word can be used as an insult, like "fool", although, due to its extremely high frequency of use in a multitude of contexts, it has lost much of its offensive character, becoming a colloquialism.

== Use ==
It is common to use both meanings of the term interchangeably:

1. To denote stupidity or ignorance, in expressions like "¡Qué güey soy, se me olvidó el celular!" (I'm such an idiot, I forgot my (cell) phone!) Or "¡No seas güey!'" (Don't be an idiot!)
2. "¡No güey! ¡Estoy en el celular!" (No dude! I'm on the phone!); "No güey, no pude ir." (No dude, I couldn't go.)
3. To refer to a person whose name is unknown, like "¿Que no es tu hermano aquel güey de camisa roja?" (Isn't the dude with the red shirt your brother?)

In the first case, it is used like the English profanity, "dumbass". In the last two cases, it is used like the American slang term, "dude".

Although the word is not always offensive nor an insult between friends, its usage is generally considered uneducated. Thus its usage is limited mostly to friends and trusted acquaintances or among young people. It is considered in poor taste for a teenager or a child to refer to an adult as "güey," although among adults it is usually used in a common way. The word is used in any social class, being equally accepted and used in all. It is also used in television and radio in popular entertainment, but not in more formal or objective programs, like in the news.

== See also ==
- Spanish profanity
