= Jorge van Rankin =

Mexican television host

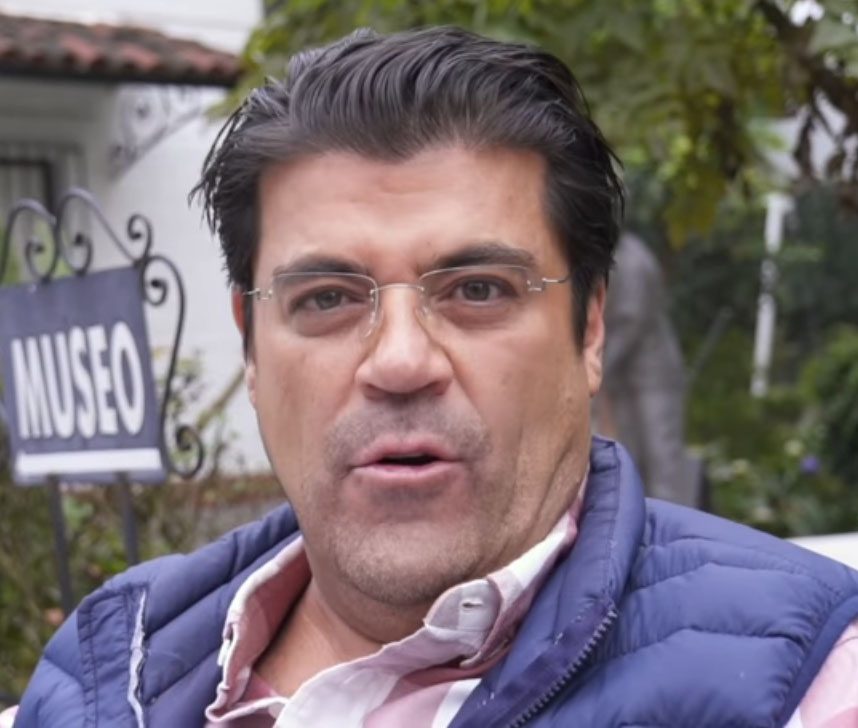
- Van Rankin in 2023
- Born: Jorge van Rankin Arellano; June 5, 1963 (age 63); Mexico City, Mexico

Jorge Van Rankin (born 5 June 1963), better known as "El Burro" (The Donkey), is a Mexican television and radio host. He began his career in radio in the late 1980s and later transitioned to television, gaining popularity as the host of shows like El Calabozo on Telehit and Miembros al Aire. He is also known for his participation in reality shows such as Big Brother VIP.

His nephews, Allan and Josecarlos Van Rankin, are a football goalkeeper and defender. Allan plays for Atlante and Josecarlos plays for Chivas. Also, his niece, Mariana is an actress.

== Biography ==
Born on June 5, 1963, Jorge van Rankin started working back in 1987 in W FM 96.9 (a Mexican radio station) with his program Fusión. He stayed there until 1990, when he moved as the manager of Televisa's Canal 5.

From 1991 to 1993 he worked at the music studio Melody and then he went back to W FM 96.9 with a new program and after that he moved to another radio station Vox FM 101.7, where he worked with Esteban Arce.

Finally, in 1993 he debuts as a television host at Telehit's El Calabozo along with his good friend Esteban Arce. The program had huge success thanks to the craziness and randomness of the show.

From there, El Burro became Vox FM's general director and the man responsible for Vox International.

He also hosted another of Telehit's great shows Fresas con Chile (Strawberries with Peppers) along with Paloma.

In 2003, he participated in the second edition of Televisa's reality show Big Brother VIP, where he was the sixth person to leave the house. Thanks to the public's support, in 2004 he went back for the third edition of Big Brother, where he made it to the final but finished in fourth place.

Currently, Jorge hosts his new show Hasta Adentro transmitted by Unicable, which also met great success. He also hosts Trancazo Musical on KRCA.
