= The Idol (2018 film) =

- Spanish: El ídolo
- Directed by: Erwin Neumaier
- Written by: Daniel Weisberg
- Produced by: Claudia G. Covarrubias
- Cinematography: Tito Reynoso
- Edited by: Alo Briones
- Music by: Santiago Ojeda
- Production company: Nowmedia
- Release date: March 2018 (Guadalajara International Film Festival)
- Country: Spain
- Language: Mexico

The Idol (Spanish: El ídolo), is a 2018 Mexican comedy film directed by Erwin Neumaier, and written by Daniel Weisberg. The plot revolves around Tomás Inclán (Francisco de la Reguera), a young musician who tries to make his sound creations recognized nationally and internationally. The film was presented in March 2018 at the Guadalajara International Film Festival.

== Cast ==
- Francisco de la Reguera as Tomás Inclán
- Roman Diaz as Guido
- Claudia Ramírez as Natasha
- Danae Reynaud as Recepcionista Dark
- Usla Haniel as Lorena
- Camila Selser as Julia
