= Esmeralda Pimentel =

Mexican actress and model

- Esmeralda in 2026
- Born: Maria Esmeralda Pimentel; September 8, 1989 (age 37); The Bronx, New York, U.S.
- Citizenship: United States; Mexico
- Occupations: Actress; model
- Years active: 2007–present

Esmeralda Pimentel (née Maria Esmeralda Pimentel on September 8, 1989) is a Mexican actress and model.

She began her media career in 2009, appearing in commercials and television promotions. After participating in Nuestra Belleza México, where she ranked the top five, she entered "Centro de Educación Artística de Televisa (CEA)" to study acting and made her debut in Verano de amor in 2009.

== Biography ==
Maria Esmeralda Pimentel was born in The Bronx, New York, on September 8, 1989, to a Dominican father and a Mexican mother.

She lived in New York City until the age of six months old when her mother dediced to move back to Mexico with her, growing up in Ciudad Guzmán, Jalisco. At nineteen she began making appearances in television commercials as a model, featuring clothing brands from Mexico.

== Career ==
=== Modeling ===
She participated in 2007 in Nuestra Belleza Jalisco representing Zapotlán. She was the first runner-up of the contest at the age of 18. On October 6, 2007, she participated with the winner Lupita González in Nuestra Belleza México 2007, both representing the state of Jalisco. At the finale, Pimentel was awarded the title of second runner-up, with the winner being Elisa Nájera.

=== Acting career on television ===
After competing in Nuestra Belleza México, she decided to enter the "Centro de Educación Artística de Televisa (CEA)", to train as an actress. Her first acting offer came in 2009 when the producer Pedro Damián gave her a small role in the telenovela Verano de amor, where she played the character "Ada". Three years later, in 2012 she worked in the telenovela Abismo de pasión, an Angelli Nesma Medina production, where she shared credits with Angelique Boyer and David Zepeda. Her character was "Kenia Jasso Navarro" and her work in the telenovela earned her a Bravo Prize for the "Best New actress". That same year, the producers Roberto Gómez Fernández and Giselle González, gave her the opportunity to participate as an antagonist in Cachito de cielo, in which she starred alongside Maite Perroni, Pedro Fernández and Jorge Poza. She played the character of "Mara", a female journalist. A year later she participated in De que te quiero, te quiero, which was produced by Lucero Suárez. She was the antagonist and shared credits with Livia Brito and Juan Diego Covarrubias.

In 2014, she had her first starring role in El color de la pasión produced by Roberto Gómez Fernández. Other cast members were Erick Elías and Claudia Ramírez. A year later, she works again with Lucero Suárez in La vecina. This is the second time that she works with Juan Diego Covarrubias and being protagonist of a telenovela.

Few years after starring as a protagonist in Enamorándome de Ramón with José Ron and La bella y las bestias with Osvaldo Benavides, Pimentel announced that she would depart from Televisa and she left her contract with the television company for the time being, as she preferred to extend more creative freedom within her artistic and acting career by looking into different theater, television, and film projects.

== Filmography ==
=== Film roles ===
Year	Title	Roles	Notes
2012	Viaje de generación	La Nueva	
2017	El que busca encuentra	Angélica	
2017	Cuando los hijos regresan	Violeta	
2019	El hubiera sí existe	Rosita	
2020	Ahi te Encargo	Cecilia	Netflix Film

=== Television roles ===
Year	Title	Roles	Notes
2009	Verano de amor	Adalberta Clavería	Recurring role; 120 episodes
2011	Como dice el dicho	Sandra	Episode: "Más vale solo"
2012	Abismo de pasión	Kenia Jasso Navarro	Supporting role; 39 episodes
2012	Cachito de cielo	Mara Magaña	Main role; 102 episodes
2013	Nueva vida	Pilar	Episode: "Madre soltera"
2013	Gossip Girl: Acapulco	Francesca Ruíz de Hinojosa	Recurring role; 6 episodes
2013	De que te quiero, te quiero	Diana Mendoza Grajales de Cáceres	Main role; 58 episodes
2014	El color de la pasión	Lucía Gaxiola Murillo	Lead role; 118 episodes
2015–2016	La vecina	Sara Granados	Lead role; 177 episodes
2016–2017	40 y 20	Lorena	Episodes: "No me importa que me digan mujeriego" and "Fake news"
2017	Las 13 esposas de Wilson Fernández	Amanda	Episode: "Amanda"
2017	Enamorándome de Ramón	Fabiola Medina	Lead role; 117 episodes
2018	La bella y las bestias	Isabela León	Lead role; 66 episodes
2020	El Candidato	Verónica de Velasco Rivera	Main role; 10 episodes
2021	The Good Doctor	Nurse Ana Morales	Guest role; 2 episodes
2022	Donde hubo fuego	Olivia Serrano	Main role; 39 episodes
2023	Montecristo	Haydée Hernández	Main role; 6 episodes
2024	Un buen divorcio	Jessica	Main role
Perverso	Mariana	Main role	

== Other awards and nominations ==
Year	Awards	Category	Recipient	Outcome
2015	33rd TVyNovelas Awards	Favoritos del público: Best Smile	Herself for El color de la pasión	Nominated
2015	33rd TVyNovelas Awards	Favoritos del público: The Prettiest	Herself for El color de la pasión	Nominated
