= De que te quiero, te quiero =

Mexican telenovela

- Genre: Telenovela
- Created by: Valentina Párraga
- Written by: Luis Reynoso; Carmen Sepúlveda; Lucero Suárez; Edwin Valencia
- Directed by: Claudia Elisa Aguilar; Armando Quiñones
- Starring: Livia Brito; Juan Diego Covarrubias; Cynthia Klitbo; Marcelo Cordoba; Aarón Hernán; Marisol del Olmo
- Opening theme: "Amor, amor" Yuri and Manuel Mijares
- Country of origin: Mexico
- Original language: Spanish
- No. of episodes: 186

Production
- Executive producer: Lucero Suárez
- Producer: Ángel Villaverde
- Production locations: Tuxpan, Veracruz; Acapulco, Guerrero; Mexico City
- Cinematography: Bernardo Nájera; Víctor Soto
- Running time: 42-45 minutes
- Production company: Televisa

Original release
- Network: Canal de las Estrellas
- Release: July 1, 2013 – March 16, 2014

Related
- Carita Pintada (1999)

De que te quiero, te quiero (stylized as "De Q Te quiero, Te quiero" in its logo; English Title: Head Over Heels (previously known as Espuma de Venus and Solamente una vez) is a Mexican telenovela produced by Lucero Suárez for Televisa. It is a remake of Carita Pintada, in 1999, a Venezuelan telenovela written by Valentina Párraga. On Monday, July 1, 2013, Canal de las Estrellas started broadcasting De Que Te Quiero, Te Quiero weekdays at 6:15pm, replacing La mujer del Vendaval. The last episode was broadcast on Sunday, March 16, 2014, with El Color de la Pasión replacing on Monday, March 17, 2014.

Livia Brito stars as the protagonist; while Juan Diego Covarrubias plays a dual protagonist and antagonist role. Fabiola Guajardo, Aarón Hernán, and Esmeralda Pimentel appear as the antagonists, while Cynthia Klitbo, Marcelo Córdoba, Marisol del Olmo, Gerardo Murguía and Carlos Ferro are featured in supporting roles.

Production of De Que Te Quiero, Te Quiero officially started on April 22, 2013. In the United States, Univision broadcast De que te quiero, te quiero from March 10, 2014 to August 29, 2014.

== Plot ==
Natalia and Diego meet in Túxpan, Veracruz, and fall in love at first sight. Diego is a handsome young businessman, noble and with good feelings, who lives in Mexico City, is the vice president of Caprico Industries and grandson of the powerful Don Vicente Cáceres, a bitter, arrogant, and controlling man. Natalia is a beautiful, simple young girl from a humble family, she is a fast food errand girl and is chosen as the queen of the fishermen's village. But she does not know that Diego has a twin brother, Rodrigo, a seductive young man with bad feelings and all that glitters is not gold without scruples. On the night of the coronation, Rodrigo tries to rape Natalia pretending to be Diego, but Andrés appears (who has always been in love with Natalia), defends her and Rodrigo falls hitting his head and is left in a coma.

When the young woman tells her mother, Carmen, what happened, she fears that Rodrigo is going to denounce her, so the García family moves to Mexico City with the excuse of "trying their luck at work" and opens a small restaurant. In addition, some of Natalia's acquaintances live in Mexico: a priest Juancho, her godmother Luz, and Eleazar, the son of Luz and Carmen's childhood friend who is also the latter's love interest.

Irene, Vicente's daughter and Diego and Rodrigo's aunt, returns to Mexico City. Irene is a depressive woman marked by destiny: when she was very young, she became pregnant by Tadeo; when her father found out, he took his daughter away from her, made her believe that she died and sent her to live abroad. Irene takes refuge in alcohol and gives her father a hard time to show him her hatred.

Soon after, Natalia meets Diego again. At first, she runs away from him while remaining under the impression that Diego had tried to rape her (while in reality it was Rodrigo who tried to do that) as he pursues her looking for an explanation of her rejection, since Diego never knew that she and his twin brother had an unpleasant encounter. When they manage to clear things up, the two cannot restart their love, because Diego is now married to Diana Mendoza. Their relationship will not only be hindered by Diana's obsessive whims, but also by Don Vicente, who disapproves of their love.

Consumed by extreme jealousy and obsession for Diego, Diana soon dies trying to run over Natalia in a car crash, thus ending her threat to separate Natalia and Diego, but the nightmares of the latter two don't end there. Another threat has begun as Rodrigo eventually gets out of his coma (in reality he was faking it unbeknownst to everyone as he regained consciousness a while back) to proceed with his revenge on Natalia by separating her from his brother Diego to keep her for himself. Rodrigo also found Brigitte, Natalia's younger sister, as a newfound ally and lover to help him get revenge while Brigitte does the same as she always hated Natalia out of pure jealousy and pettiness. Because of these unpleasant circumstances, Natalia and Diego will have to fight to be together and love each other even more while investigating further secretive moments from the past.

== Cast ==
Confirmed as of March 21, 2013.

- Livia Brito as Natalia García Pabuena / Natalia Vargas Cáceres de Cáceres
- Juan Diego Covarrubias as Diego / Rodrigo Cáceres
- Cynthia Klitbo as Carmen García Pabuena de Medina
- Marcelo Córdoba as Eleazar Medina Suárez
- Aarón Hernán as Vicente Cáceres
- Marisol del Olmo as Irene Cáceres de Vargas
- Silvia Mariscal as Luz Suárez de Medina
- Alfredo Gatica as Abdul García Pabuena
- Fabiola Guajardo as Brigitte García Pabuena
- Pierre Louis as Paolo García Pabuena
- Fernanda Sasse as Guadalupe "Lupita" García Pabuena
- Gerardo Murguía as Tadeo Vargas
- Carmen Becerra as Mireya "La Jaiba" Zamudio
- Daniela Luján as Karina Montiel
- Carlos Ferro as Alonso Cortés
- Eduardo Shaklett as Abdul Abdalá
- Esmeralda Pimentel as Diana Mendoza Grajales de Cáceres
- Arleth Terán as Cunchetina Capone de Ricci
- Lisardo as Roberto Esparza / Carlos Pereyra
- Laura Carmine as Simona Verduzco
- Ricardo Fernández Rue as Alberto Campos
- Hugo Macías Macotela as Tiburcio Chavez
- Mirta Renee as Kimberly
- Sofia Tejeda as Lala
- Polo Monarrez as Edwin Morales
- Rolando Brito as Padre Juan "Juancho" Rivera
- José Carlos Femat as Andrés Figueroa
- Ricardo Kleinbaum as Gino Ricci
- Alejandro Ibarra as Paul Champignon
- José Luis Badalt as Óscar

== Reception ==
On Univision, the finale of De Que Te Quiero, Te Quiero reached 3.1 million viewers with a 12.7 rating.

== Awards and nominations ==
Year	Award	Category	Nominated	Result
2014	TVyNovelas Awards			
2014	TVyNovelas Awards	Best Telenovela	De que te quiero, te quiero	Nominated
2014	TVyNovelas Awards	Multiplatform Telenovela	De que te quiero, te quiero	Nominated
2014	TVyNovelas Awards	Best Actor	Juan Diego Covarrubias	Won
2014	TVyNovelas Awards	Best Antagonist Actress	Esmeralda Pimentel	Nominated
2014	TVyNovelas Awards	Best Leading Actress	Cynthia Klitbo	Nominated
2014	TVyNovelas Awards	Best Co-lead Actress	Cynthia Klitbo	Won
2014	TVyNovelas Awards	Best Co-lead Actor	Aarón Hernán	Nominated
2014	TVyNovelas Awards	Best Supporting Actress	Marisol del Olmo	Nominated
2014	TVyNovelas Awards	Favoritos del Público #Favoritekiss	Livia Brito and Juan Diego Covarrubias	Won
2014	ACE Awards	Best Actor	Juan Diego Covarrubias	Won
2014	ACE Awards	Best Characteristic Actor	Hugo Macías Macotela	Won
2013	TV Adicto Golden Awards	Best Male Revelation	Juan Diego Covarrubias	Won
