= 32nd TVyNovelas Awards =

2014 Mexican TV awards

- Date: March 23, 2014
- Location: Plaza Condesa, Mexico City, Mexico
- Hosted by: Adrián Uribe, Galilea Montijo & Alan Tacher

Highlights
- Most awards: Amores verdaderos (9)
- Most nominations: Mentir para vivir (14)

Television/radio coverage
- Network: Canal de las Estrellas

The 32nd TVyNovelas Awards were an academy of special awards to the best soap opera and TV shows. The awards ceremony took place on March 23, 2014, in Mexico City. The ceremony was televised in Mexico by Canal de las Estrellas and in the United States by Univision.

Adrián Uribe, Galilea Montijo and Alan Tacher hosted the show. Amores verdaderos won 9 awards, the most for the evening, including Best Telenovela. Other winners Mentir para vivir won 3 awards, De que te quiero, te quiero won 2 awards and La mujer del Vendaval, La tempestad and Libre para amarte won 1 each.

== Summary of awards and nominations ==
Telenovela	Nominations	Awards
Mentir para vivir	14	3
Amores verdaderos	13	9
Porque el amor manda	9	0
De que te quiero, te quiero	8	2
Corazón indomable	8	0
La tempestad	4	1
La mujer del Vendaval	3	1
Libre para amarte	1	1

== Winners and nominees ==
=== Telenovelas ===
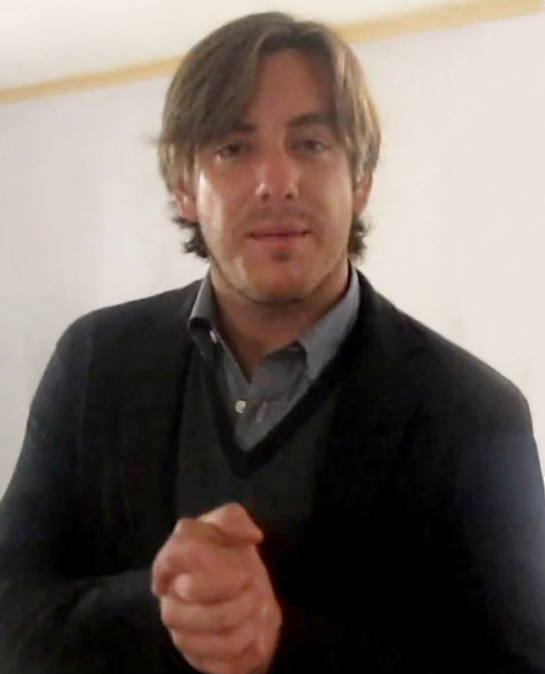
Juan Diego Covarrubias, winner for Best Actor

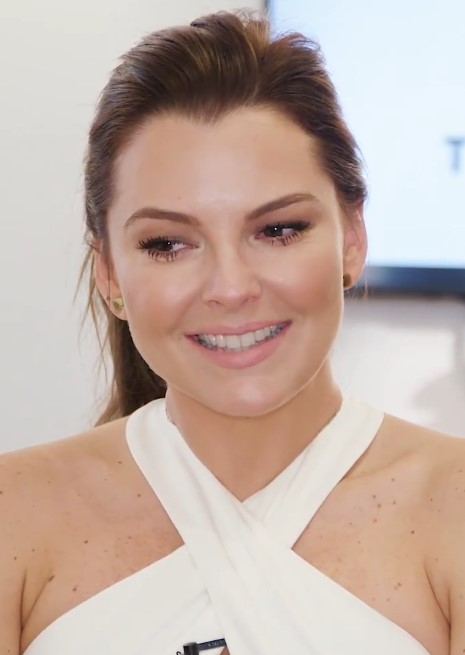
Marjorie de Sousa, winner for Best Antagonist Actress

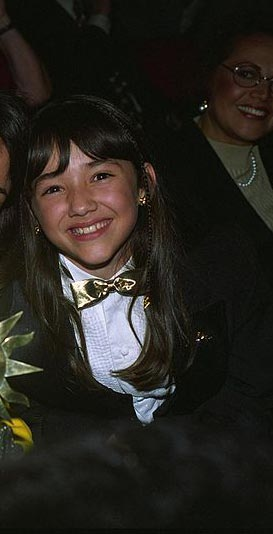
Sherlyn winner for Best Young Lead Actress

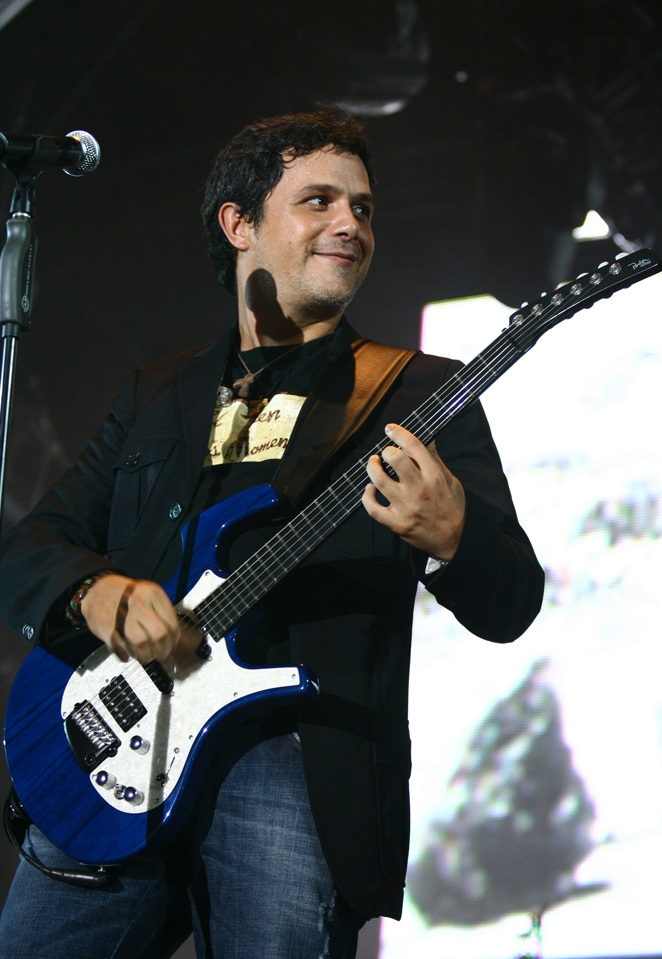
Alejandro Sanz, winner for Best Musical Theme with the song "No me compares"

Best Telenovela	Best Multiplatform Telenovela
Amores verdaderos; Corazón indomable; De que te quiero, te quiero; Mentir para vivir; Porque el amor manda	Amores verdaderos; Corazón indomable; De que te quiero, te quiero; Mentir para vivir; Porque el amor manda
Best Actress	Best Actor
Erika Buenfil – Amores verdaderos; Ana Brenda Contreras – Corazón indomable; Blanca Soto – Porque el amor manda; Mayrín Villanueva – Mentir para vivir	Juan Diego Covarrubias – De que te quiero, te quiero; Daniel Arenas – Corazón indomable; David Zepeda – Mentir para vivir; Sebastián Rulli – Amores verdaderos
Best Antagonist Actress	Best Antagonist Actor
Marjorie de Sousa – Amores verdaderos; Altair Jarabo – Mentir para vivir; Claudia Álvarez – Porque el amor manda; Esmeralda Pimentel – De que te quiero, te quiero	Manuel Ojeda – La tempestad; Diego Olivera – Mentir para vivir; Erick Elías – Porque el amor manda; Iván Sánchez – La tempestad
Best Leading Actress	Best Leading Actor
Ana Martín – Amores verdaderos; Cynthia Klitbo – De que te quiero, te quiero; Daniela Romo – La tempestad	Jesús Ochoa – Libre para amarte; Ignacio López Tarso – Corazón indomable; Patricio Castillo – Mentir para vivir
Best Co-lead Actress	Best Co-lead Actor
Cynthia Klitbo – De que te quiero, te quiero; Cecilia Gabriela – Mentir para vivir; Kika Edgar – Porque el amor manda; Natalia Esperón – Amores verdaderos	Felipe Nájera – Mentir para vivir; Aarón Hernán – De que te quiero, te quiero; Alejandro Ávila – Porque el amor manda
Best Supporting Actress	Best Supporting Actor
Susana González – Amores verdaderos; Leticia Perdigón – Mentir para vivir; Marisol del Olmo – De que te quiero, te quiero	Manuel "Flaco" Ibáñez – La mujer del Vendaval; José Carlos Ruiz – Corazón indomable; Juan Carlos Barreto – Mentir para vivir
Best Young Lead Actress	Best Young Lead Actor
Sherlyn – Amores verdaderos; Michelle Renaud – La mujer del Vendaval; Thelma Madrigal – La mujer del Vendaval	Alejandro Speitzer – Mentir para vivir; Eleazar Gómez – Amores verdaderos; Ricardo Franco – Corazón indomable
Best Musical Theme	Best Original Story or Adaptation
"No me compares" — Alejandro Sanz – Amores verdaderos; "El amor manda" — María José – Porque el amor manda; "Hoy tengo ganas de ti" — Alejandro Fernández ft Christina Aguilera – La tempestad	Kary Fajer and Ximena Suárez – Amores verdaderos; Carlos Romero and Tere Medina – Corazón indomable; María Zarattini and Claudia Velazco – Mentir para vivir
Best Direction
Benjamín Cann and Rodrigo Zaunbos – Mentir para vivir; Jorge Fons, Gilberto Macín, Salvador Sánchez and Aurelio Ávila – Porque el amor manda; Salvador Garcini and Ricardo de la Parra – Amores verdaderos

=== Others ===
Best Unit Program	Best Variety Program
La rosa de Guadalupe; Como dice el dicho; La CQ	Hoy; Estrella2; Una noche con Yuri
Best Competitions Program	Best Restricted TV Program
La Voz México; El gran chapuzón; En familia con Chabelo; Parodiando	Miembros al aire; Está cañón; Netas divinas; Pa' la banda; STANDparados
Best Special Program	Best Series
Festival Acapulco 2013; Bandamax Awards; Nuestra Belleza México 2013; Telehit Awards	María de todos los Ángeles; Cásate conmigo, mi amor; Gossip Girl Acapulco; Nueva vida
Best Univision Hostess	Best Univision Host
Maity Interiano; Ana Patricia González; Chiquinquirá Delgado; Lourdes Stephen; Tanya Charry; Verónica Bastos	Alan Tacher; Carlos Calderón; Javier Poza

== Audience's Favorites ==
The Audience's Favorites were categories that the audience chose through Twitter and the most voted were selected for the next round. Voting took place on the awards' official website. The awards were given on March 22, 2014.

Amores verdaderos won 4 awards, the most for the evening, including Favorite Finale. Other winners Corazón indodmale, De que te quiero, te quiero and La mujer del Vendaval won 1 award each.

=== Summary of awards and nominations ===
Telenovela	Nominations	Awards
Amores verdaderos	7	4
Corazón indomable	6	1
La mujer del Vendaval	6	1
La tempestad	6	0
Mentir para vivir	5	0
Libre para amarte	3	0
Porque el amor manda	3	0
De que te quiero, te quiero	2	1
Qué bonito amor	2	0

=== Winners and nominees ===
The Most Beautiful Woman	The Most Handsome Man
Ariadne Díaz – La mujer del Vendaval; Ana Brenda Contreras – Corazón indomable; Blanca Soto – Porque el amor manda; Livia Brito – De que te quiero, te quiero; Marjorie de Sousa – Amores verdaderos; Ximena Navarrete – La tempestad	Daniel Arenas – Corazón indomable; David Zepeda – Mentir para vivir; Gabriel Soto – Libre para amarte; José Ron – La mujer del Vendaval; Pablo Montero – Qué bonito amor; Sebastián Rulli – Amores verdaderos
Favorite Villain	Favorite Slap
Marjorie de Sousa – Amores verdaderos; Altair Jarabo – Mentir para vivir; Chantal Andere – La mujer del Vendaval; Elizabeth Álvarez – Corazón indomable; Harry Geithner – Libre para amarte; Mariana Seoane – La tempestad	Erika Buenfil and Marjorie de Sousa – Amores verdaderos; Ana Brenda Contreras and Elizabeth Álvarez – Corazón indomable; Ariadne Díaz and José Ron – La mujer del Vendaval; Laura Carmine and Ximena Navarrete – La tempestad; Leticia Perdigón and Mayrin Villanueva – Mentir para vivir
Favorite Kiss	Favorite Coupla
Livia Brito and Juan Diego Covarrubias – De que te quiero, te quiero; Ariadne Díaz and José Ron – La mujer del Vendaval; Blanca Soto and Fernando Colunga – Porque el amor manda; Erika Buenfil and Eduardo Yáñez – Amores verdaderos; Mayrín Villanueva and David Zepeda – Mentir para vivir; Ximena Navarrete and William Levy – La tempestad	Erika Buenfil and Eduardo Yáñez – Amores verdaderos; Ana Brenda Contreras and Daniel Arenas – Corazón indomable; Blanca Soto and Fernando Colunga – Porque el amor manda; Gloria Trevi and Gabriel Soto – Libre para amarte; Mayrín Villanueva and David Zepeda – Mentir para vivir; Ximena Navarrete and William Levy – La tempestad
Favorite Finale
Amores verdaderos; Corazón indomable; La mujer del Vendaval; La tempestad; Qué bonito amor

== In Memoriam ==
- Sara Montiel
- Raul "Choforo" Padilla
- Enrique Lizalde
- Juan Osorio Jr.
- Pedro Ferriz Santa Cruz
- Johnny Laboriel
- Irma Lozano
- Ana Bertha Lepe
- Guillermina Bravo
- Amparo Rivelles
- Juan Pelaez
- Karla Álvarez
- Pedro Septién
- Leon Michel
- Eugenia Avendaño
- Alma Muriel
- Nelson Ned
- Gibrán Martiz
- Rosario "Chayito" de Alba
- Jorge Arvizu
