= Enrique Guerra =

Mexican sculptor (1871–1943)

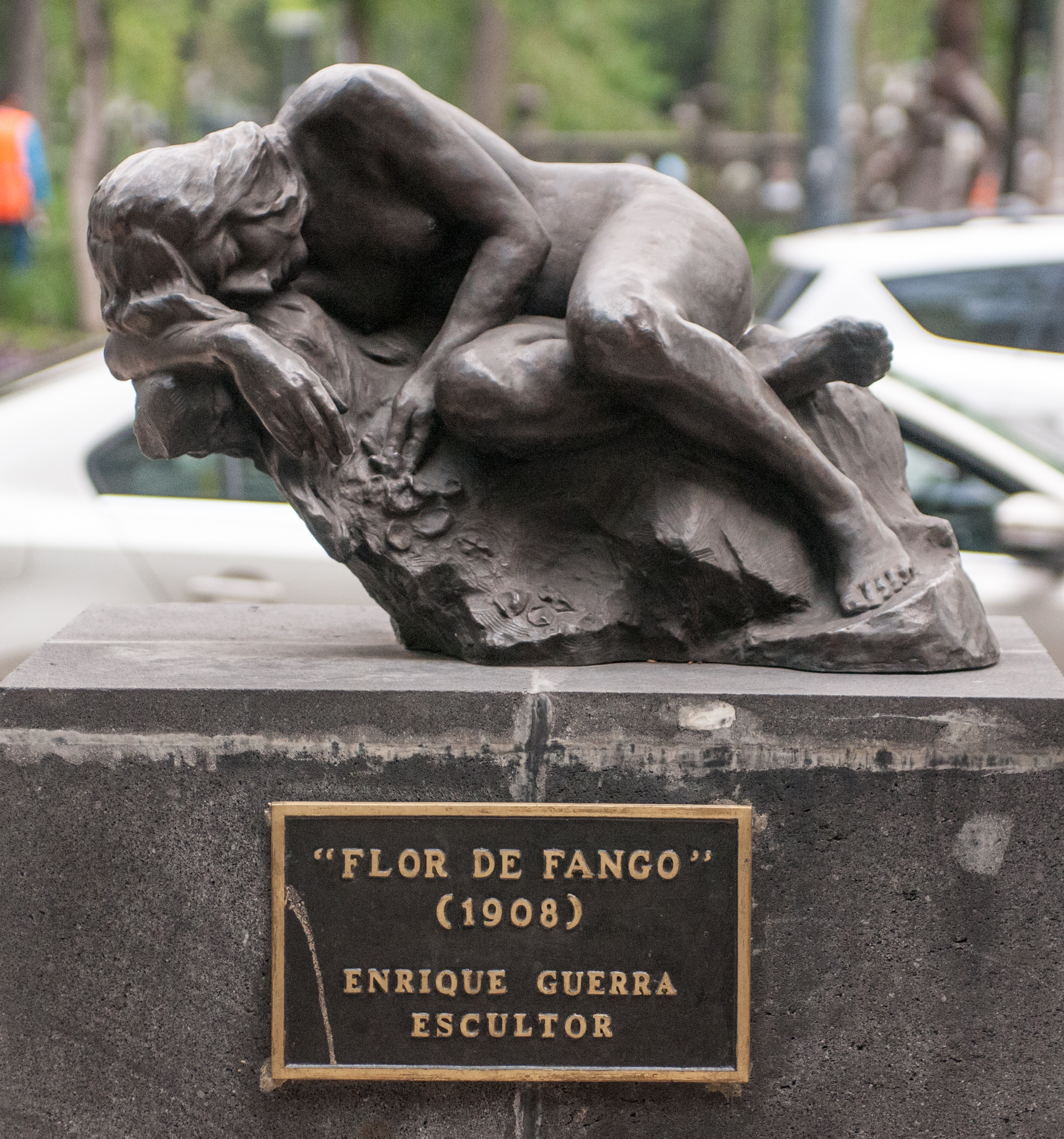
Flor de Fango (1908), Mexico City

Enrique Guerra (1871–1943) was a Mexican sculptor from Xalapa, Veracruz.

== Biography ==
He was born on November 8, 1871, and died on February 3, 1943, at the age of 71. He originated from a family that lived in poverty, which forced him to carry out several jobs at once while attending school at the same time, allowing him to gain experience as a saddler. As he was raised within the Techacapa neighborhood and started off as an altar boy for the church of San Jorge, Guerra proved himself to be highly skilled in embossing, eventually producing decorative and embossed works as an experienced saddler in a workshop. Perfecting his skills for several years, Guerra was moved to Paris by the government of Veracruz in an effort to further improve his skills, which led to the sculptor creating multiple works based on the teachings of his mentors. While having almost all of his works recognized from numerous events that he entered throughout his education, Guerra became an academic in Drawing and Modeling, teaching at many schools such as the National Preparatory School and the School of Master builders. As the lack of projects have taken away Guerra's motivation in life and forced him into becoming more sluggish in his daily activities, he soon died alongside his family on February 3, 1943.

== Education ==
During his education, Guerra attended the Xalapa Preparatory School after receiving assistance by Governor Teodoro A Dehesa Mendez. He proceeded to gain the attention of his former teacher, Catucci, through his artistic talent, earning another scholarship to the San Carlos Academy that he attends several years after. As he transitioned into the start of the 20th century, Guerra was offered an opportunity to study at the Academy of Fine Arts and the Julien Academy in Paris, France. He studied painting under Catucci at the Xalapa Preparatory School and José María Velasco at the San Carlos Academy, sculpting under Miguel Noreña, and was influenced by poet Rubén Darío.

== Artworks ==
Over his lifetime, the artist created a large number of works, many of which were monumental in size, creating that way for maximum effect of his relatively simple but energetic compositions. After spending some time in Paris, the skills he accumulated can be seen in works such as Asesinato de Cesár, Coroliano, Thais, Crisálida, Caín y Abel, La caza del oso and Mendigo. In Mexico, his large sculptures of bronze or stone at the various buildings of the Secretariat of Foreign Affairs and include depictions of Benito Juárez and José María Liceaga Cornelio Ortiz de Zárate. Despite the numerous works that Guerra has created over his career, his most notable piece would be the Las Cuatro Virtudes Cardinales.

Within his birthplace of Xalapa, Guerra had created a set of four statues called Las Cuatro Virtudes Cardinales consisting of Carrara marble that were physical manifestations of the cardinal virtues, which were considered to be Strength, Justice, Prudence, and even Temperance. It was initially planned by Guerra for the statues to be placed at the Palacio de Relaciones Exteriores before being forced to hold onto the statues when it was revealed that there was no space at the location until he ultimately decided to send the statues to Xalapa, where the city moved the statues to Parque Juarez. Despite each statue meant to be put together as a whole, only three of the four statues were set up in Parque Juarez in 1931 while the fourth statue was set in Chapultepec, which was then replaced by a copy made by Armando Zavaleta Leon to be with the other three statues in 1979. Throughout the years until the 21st century, the statues were made to represent the city, acting as a part of the city's history.

Other artworks that he has also created include:

- Eros y Psiquis
- Epave
- Voluptuousness
- Gigolette
- Sulamita Dans le Reve
- Flor de Fango
- Beggar
- Enrique Repsamen
- Luis G. Urbina (1938)
- Luz y Sombra (1942)
- La Sedienta
- Monument to Bolivar
- La Perla
- The Bear Hunt
- Mermaid Jewelry Box
- Prometheus

== Exhibitions ==
- Attended the Mexican Salon of the 1900 Paris World Exposition in Paris, France
- Attended and won a prize at the Paris Salon exhibition of Académie des Beaux-Arts in Paris, France (1906)

== Collections ==
- Multiple works, such as Voluptuousness and Asesinato de Cesár, are collected by the National Museum of Art in Mexico City, Mexico
- Thai and Flor de Fango kept the Paseo de los Escultores at the Hemiciclo a Juarez in Mexico City, Mexico

== Honors and awards ==
- Sulamite Dans le Reve earned honorable mention at Julien Academy in Paris, France (1904)
- Prometheus received first prize and Cain received honorable mention at Julien Academy in Pairs, France (1905)
- Crisalida won a prize at the Paris Salon exhibition of Académie des Beaux-Arts in Paris, France (1906)
