= Claudia Ramírez =

Mexican actress (born 1964)

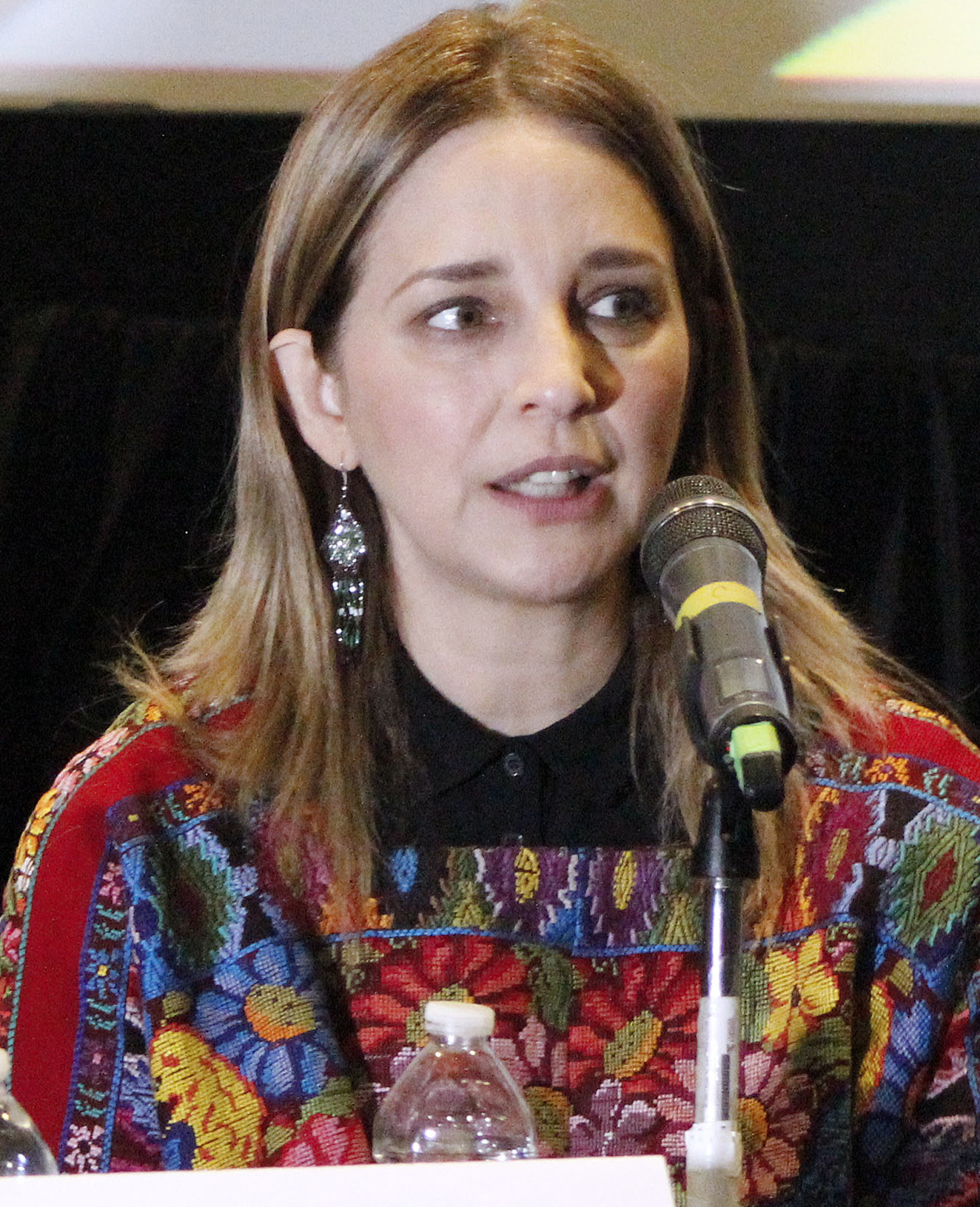
- Ramírez in 2018
- Born: Claudia Julieta Ramírez Valdez; July 30, 1964 (age 62); Minatitlán, Veracruz, Mexico
- Occupation: Actress
- Years active: 1983–present

Claudia Julieta Ramírez Valdez (born July 30, 1964) is a Mexican actress.

== Filmography ==
=== Film roles ===
| Year | Title | Roles | Notes |
|---|---|---|---|
| 1986 | Crónica de familia | María Iturbide | |
| 1987 | Herencia maldita | Unknown role | |
| 1988 | La furia de un dios | Estefanía | |
| 1991 | Sólo con tu pareja | Clarisa Negrete | |
| 1993 | Repartidores de muerte | Claudia | |
| 1994 | Vagabunda | Perla | |
| 1995 | Juego limpio | Alejandra | |
| 1995 | Instinto asesino II | Sandy | |
| 2001 | De la calle | Automovilista | |
| 2005 | Espinas | Doña Chabe | |
| 2006 | Sexo, amor y otras perversiones | Rubia / Mujer / Woman | Segment: "The Call" |
| 2006 | La balada de Ringo Starr | Psiquiatra | Short film |
| 2011 | Flor de Fango | Ruth | |
| 2012 | Hecho en China | Clara | |
| 2014 | Casi treinta | Mamá Lucía | |
| 2018 | Dibujando el cielo | Marifer | |
| 2018 | The Idol | Natasha | |
| 2019 | Mirreyes contra Godínez | Emilia | |
| 2019 | El hubiera sí existe | Guadalupe | |
| 2020 | El club de los idealistas | Tristana | |
| 2022 | Mirreyes contra Godínez 2: El retiro | Emilia Kuri | |
| 2022 | Valentino, Be Your Own Hero Or Villain | Elena | |

=== Television roles ===
| Year | Title | Roles | Notes |
|---|---|---|---|
| 1983 | La Fiera | Saleswoman | Guest role |
| 1985 | Juana Iris | Montserrat | Supporting role |
| 1985 | El ángel caído | | Guest role |
| 1986 | Lista negra | Nora Capelli | Supporting role |
| 1986 | Cautiva | Gabriela | Supporting role |
| 1987 | La indomable | Nabile | Supporting role |
| 1989 | Morir para vivir | Alicia Guzmán / Andrea Quijano | Lead role |
| 1991 | La pícara soñadora | Rosa Fernández | Supporting role |
| 1992 | Triángulo | Nina | Supporting role |
| 1993 | Los parientes pobres | Juliana Santos | Main role |
| 1995 | María José | María José | Lead role |
| 1996–1997 | Te sigo amando | Yulissa Torres-Quintero | Lead role |
| 1997–1998 | Demasiado corazón | Natalia Solórzano | Lead role |
| 1998–1999 | El amor de mi vida | Ana Valdez | Lead role |
| 2001–2002 | Lo que es el amor | Tania Lomelí | Lead role |
| 2005 | Mujeres | Irene | Episode: "Amas de caza" |
| 2007–2008 | Sexo y otros secretos | Irene | Main role |
| 2009 | Plaza Sésamo | Clau | |
| 2010 | Gritos de muerte y libertad | Riaño's wife | Episode: "Sangre que divide" |
| 2012 | Infames | María Eugenia Tequida | Supporting role |
| 2012–2013 | Rosa diamante | Raquel Altamirano | Main role |
| 2013 | Fortuna | Mercedes Ledesma | Main role |
| 2014 | El color de la pasión | Rebeca Murillo de Gaxiola | Lead role; 117 episodes |
| 2015 | Lo imperdonable | Magdalena | Main role; 113 episodes |
| 2016 | El hotel de los secretos | Cecilia Gaitán | Supporting role; 42 episodes |
| 2017 | Sincronía | Lourdes | 2 episodes |
| 2017–2018 | Sin tu mirada | Prudencia Arzuaga de Ocaranza | Main role; 112 episodes |
| 2018 | La jefa del campeón | Nadia Padilla de Linares | Main role; 61 episodes |
| 2018 | Mi lista de exes | Sonia | Episode: "Capítulo final" |
| 2019 | La usurpadora | Camilo's boss | Episode: "El rescate de Paulina" |
| 2021 | Fuego ardiente | Irene Ferrer | Lead role |
| 2021 | Who Killed Sara? | Mariana Lazcano | Main role |
| 2022–2023 | Mi secreto | Fedra Espinoza | Main role |
| 2024 | Bandidos | Marisa | 2 episodes |
| 2025 | Regalo de amor | Fausta Mondragón Villegas | Main role |
| 2025 | El dentista | Carmen Carvajal | |
| 2026 | El Mochaorjeas | Juliana Rivera | Episode: "NN" |
| 2026 | Polen | Beatriz Zamudio | Main role |
| 2026 | El renacer de Luna | Mercedes | |

== Awards and nominations ==
=== Premios TVyNovelas ===
| Year | Category | Telenovela | Result |
|---|---|---|---|
| 1998 | Best Lead Actress | Te sigo amando | Nominated |
| 2015 | Best Female Antagonist | El color de la pasión | Nominated |
