= Érase una vez =

Mexican web television series

- Genre: Drama
- Created by: Marcos Osorio Vidal; Gustavo Malajovich; Hernán Goldfrid
- Directed by: Pedro Ybarra
- Narrated by: Enrique Rocha
- Country of origin: Mexico
- Original language: Spanish
- No. of seasons: 1
- No. of episodes: 12

Production
- Executive producers: Gonzalo Cilley; Andrés Tovar; Marcela Ibarra; Araceli Sánchez Mariscal; Pedro Ybarra
- Production companies: Resonant TV; Chocolate Cine

Original release
- Network: Blim; Canal 5
- Release: 2 October 2017

Érase una vez (stylized onscreen Érase una vez, lo que no te contaron del cuento), is a Mexican crime drama streaming television series produced by Andrés Tovar, Gonzalo Cilley, Pedro Ybarra, Araceli Sánchez Mariscal and Marcela Ibarra for Blim. Based on the classic stories, the series shows the current situation in Mexico. The first season was released on 2 October 2017.

== Cast ==
- Enrique Rocha as Narrator
- Pablo Lyle as Esteban (episode, "Blanca Nieves")
- Renata Notni as Blanca Valle (episode, "Blanca Nieves")
- Anna Ciocchetti as Lucía Cardeña (episode, "Blanca Nieves")
- Luis Arrieta as Mateo Toledo (episode, "Los tres cochinitos")
- Andrés Palacios as Vidal (episode, "Caperucita Roja")
- Alejandro Belmonte as Galindo (episode, "Ricitos de oro")
- Alicia Jaziz as Pilar (episode, "Caperucita Roja")
- Evangelina Elizondo as Ágata (episode, "La bella y la bestia")
- Fabiola Guajardo as Diana (episode, "El príncipe y el mendigo")
- Sergio Lozano as Carlos / Eduardo (episode, "El príncipe y el mendigo")
- Osvaldo de León as Daniel Torres (episode, "El gato con botas")
- Isela Vega as Águeda (episode, "Hansel y Gretel")
- Ana Layevska as Cinthia (episode, "Patito feo")
- Valentina Acosta as Noemí (episode, "La bella y la bestia")
- Carlos Ferro as Marco Thierón (episode, "La bella y la bestia")
- Moisés Arizmendi as Ricardo Toledo (episode, "La bella y la bestia")
- Eduardo Victoria as Sergio Montiel (episode, "El príncipe y el mendigo")

== Production ==
The series is adapted to the police genre, but from a dark and sophisticated point of view. The first season consists of 12 episodes, each with a beginning of plot and closing. In the first season they tell classic stories such as Little Red Riding Hood, Snow White, The Boy Who Cried Wolf, The Prince and the Pauper, Puss in Boots, Goldilocks and the Three Bears, Beauty and the Beast, The Three Little Pigs, Sleeping Beauty, Pinocchio, and Hansel & Gretel each of these stories will be adapted to the present.

== Episodes ==
The season consists of a total of 12 episodes.

No.	Title	Directed by	Original release date	Television air date	Mexico viewers (millions)
1	"Caperucita Roja"	Pedro Pablo Ybarra	October 2, 2017	2 October 2017	1.0
Pilar lives in a city where they have just killed a woman. And she doesn't realize that the killer can now be very close to her.
2	"El pastor mentiroso"	Luis Kuri	October 2, 2017	9 October 2017	0.87
Antonio is a journalist who seeks to a higher position and does not care what he has to do to achieve it, to exceed all limits. While police investigate the murder of a sex worker.
3	"Los tres cochinitos"	Pedro Pablo Ybarra	October 2, 2017	16 October 2017	0.98
Three brothers are assaulting and killing people; these criminals intersect in the life of an architect and his wife, which will turn the story.
4	"Pinocho"	Hari Sama	October 2, 2017	23 October 2017	0.84
Vicente has a grandson named Rafa, who must wear walking gear. The boy will do anything, so that he can achieve a purpose and improve his condition of life.
5	"Blanca Nieves"	Pedro Pablo Ybarra	October 2, 2017	30 October 2017	0.76
Lucía is a much older actress and is very egocentric. One day, she loses control after finding out that her leading role is taken away from her to give it to a young and beautiful actress named Blanca.
6	"Patito feo"	Raúl Martínez	October 2, 2017	6 November 2017	0.71
Patricia is dedicated to advocacy and, at the same time, decides to investigate homicides, without measuring the danger that this can cause.
7	"Hansel y Gretel"	Luis Felipe Ybarra	October 2, 2017	13 November 2017	0.67
By a conflict, two siblings are sent to an alleged orphanage where children are exploited. They will have to find a way back home with their dad.
8	"La bella y la bestia"	Pedro Pablo Ybarra	October 2, 2017	20 November 2017	0.62
Marco is a famous writer who could be said to have everything: fame, health and a wife about to give him a child, but one day, the presence of a chilling lady, makes his life take a big turn.
9	"Ricitos de oro"	Enrique Begné	October 2, 2017	27 November 2017	0.76
Rebeca is a girl who is dedicated to assaulting houses, but one day without imagining it, she gets into the wrong house.
10	"La Bella durmiente"	Hernan Kesselman	October 2, 2017	4 December 2017	0.73
Marina is a young model who falls into a coma and is transferred to a hospital. Paco is a nurse who is assigned to take care of her; his instinct makes him suspect that someone wants to kill her.
11	"El gato con botas"	Javier Colinas	October 2, 2017	11 December 2017	0.81
In an unexpected encounter, Daniel, a musical representative, meets Tony, the son of a well-known singer who committed suicide several years ago. The two will unite to make pay who has taken advantage of the musical dreams of several people.
12	"El príncipe y el mendigo"	Pedro Pablo Ybarra	October 2, 2017	18 December 2017	0.76
Eduardo is a very young and successful entrepreneur, who by chance of fate realizes that he has a twin brother who did not run with his fate.

== Ratings ==
Viewership and ratings per season of Érase una vez
Season	Episodes	First aired		Last aired		Avg. viewers (millions)	18–49 rank
Season	Episodes	Date	Viewers (millions)	Date	Viewers (millions)	Avg. viewers (millions)	18–49 rank
1	12	2 October 2017	1.0	18 December 2017	0.76	0.79	TBD

== Awards and nominations ==
Year	Award	Category	Nominated	Result
2018	TVyNovelas Awards	Best Series	Pedro Ybarra	Nominated
