= Montecristo (2023 TV series) =

- Genre: Drama
- Based on: The Count of Monte Cristo by Alexandre Dumas
- Developed by: Lidia Fraga; Jacobo Díaz
- Directed by: Alberto Ruiz Rojo
- Starring: William Levy
- Composer: Jeansy Aúz
- Country of origin: Mexico
- Original language: Spanish
- No. of seasons: 1
- No. of episodes: 6

Production
- Executive producers: William Levy; Jeff Goldberg; Sergio Pizzolante; Ángela Agudo; David Martínez; David Cotarelo
- Editor: Silvina Soto
- Production companies: Secuoya Studios; William Levy Entertainment

Original release
- Network: Vix+
- Release: 14 April 2023

Montecristo is a Mexican streaming television miniseries based on Alexandre Dumas' 1844 novel The Count of Monte Cristo. The series stars William Levy in the title role.

It premiered on Vix+ on 14 April 2023.

== Cast ==
- William Levy as Edmundo Dantés / Alejandro Montecristo
- Esmeralda Pimentel as Haydée Hernández
- Roberto Enríquez as Fernando Alvarez Mondego
- Juan Fernández as Cristobal Herrera
- Silvia Abascal as Mercedes Herrera
- Itziar Atienza as Helena Vilaforte
- Guiomar Puerta as Alba Mondego
- Héctor Noas as Salvador Faria
- Franky Martín as Jackie
- Vladimir Cruz
- Alberto Olmo
- Roberto San Martín
- Javier Godino
- Julia Reina
- Ana Álvarez
- Ramón Esquinas

== Production ==
=== Development ===
On 13 January 2022, it was announced that Pantaya, Secuoya Studios and William Levy Entertainment would co-produce an adaption of Alexandre Dumas' 1844 novel The Count of Monte Cristo. Filming began in June 2022 in Madrid and the Canary Islands. On 24 January 2023, it was announced that the series would premiere on Vix, following TelevisaUnivision's acquisition of Pantaya.

=== Casting ===
In January 2022, it was announced that Levy would star in the lead role. In April 2022, it was announced that Esmeralda Pimentel would star in the series.

== Episodes ==
No.	Title	Original release date
1	"Odio"	14 April 2023
2	"Pasado"	14 April 2023
3	"Atracción"	14 April 2023
4	"Por amor"	14 April 2023
5	"Triángulo"	14 April 2023
6	"Venganza"	14 April 2023

== Release ==
Montecristo premiered on Vix+ on 14 April 2023. In Spain, the show began streaming on Movistar Plus+ on 21 April 2023.
