= The Color of Passion =

Mexican telenovela

- Also known as: Pasión de amor
- Genre: Telenovela
- Created by: José Cuauhtémoc Blanco; María del Carmen Peña
- Starring: Erick Elías; Esmeralda Pimentel; Claudia Ramírez; René Strickler; Eugenia Cauduro
- Theme music composer: José Luis Roma; Noel Schajris
- Opening theme: "Hoy es un buen día" by Río Roma
- Country of origin: Mexico
- Original language: Spanish
- No. of episodes: 122

Production
- Executive producer: Roberto Gómez Fernández
- Producer: Silvia Cano
- Camera setup: Multi-camera
- Running time: 42-45 minutes
- Production company: Televisa

Original release
- Network: Canal de las Estrellas
- Release: March 17 – August 31, 2014

The Color of Passion (Original title in Spanish: El color de la pasión) is a Mexican telenovela produced by Roberto Gómez Fernández for Televisa. The screenplay was written by José Cuauhtémoc Blanco and María del Carmen Peña, who were also the co-writers of stories like Cadenas de amargura, El manantial and Mi pecado.

The plot is set in Puebla and follows the lives of the prestigious Murillo family, consisting of Adriana (Ariadne Díaz), Magdalena (Ana Isabel Torre) and Rebeca (Michelle Renaud), who are orphans.

The series stars Erick Elías, Esmeralda Pimentel, Claudia Ramírez, René Strickler and Eugenia Cauduro.

== Plot ==
Scene of Adriana (Ariadne Díaz) and Alonso (Horacio Pancheri).

The story takes place in Puebla and follows the lives of the prestigious Murillo family, consisting of Adriana (Ariadne Díaz), Magdalena (Ana Isabel Torre) and Rebeca (Michelle Renaud), who are orphans.

Adriana is married to Alonso Gaxiola (Horacio Pancheri), owner of a Talavera factory, and her two sisters live with them. Their marriage seems perfect, since they don't realize that Rebeca is a capricious and twisted woman who knows how to pass in front of everyone like a true angel; only Magdalena suspects her sister's intentions.

Rebeca has always been secretly in love with Alonso and that is why she envies Adriana, but that feeling turns into hatred when Adriana becomes pregnant. Meanwhile, Magdalena faces tragedy when her fiancé vanishes on their wedding day, leading her to seek solace in a convent. Shortly after Magdalena goes to the capital, Alonso travels abroad to close a deal and export his products. During this time, Adriana suffers an accident, leaving only her baby alive. Alonso finds comfort in his daughter, Lucía, as Rebeca takes advantage of the situation.

Scene of an argument between Lucía (Esmeralda Pimentel), Marcelo (Erick Elías) and Rebeca (Claudia Ramírez).

24 years later, Alonso (René Strickler) and Rebeca (Claudia Ramírez) are now married. She has become a mother to Lucía (Esmeralda Pimentel) and is the best wife in the world. The couple has a second daughter, Nora (Ximena Romo), who is 22 years old; she is frivolous, capricious and manipulative, just like her mother.

Rebeca is full of frustrations, stemming from her realization that she will never have Alonso's complete love. Seeking consolation in extramarital affairs only adds to her loneliness. After humiliating her lover in turn, he commits suicide and she underestimates the determination of his family, especially his brother, Marcelo (Erick Elías), to uncover the truth.

Marcelo quickly discovers the secret behind his brother's death within the Gaxiola Murillo family in Puebla. Seeking revenge, he skillfully interacts with them and falls in love with Lucía, who initially rejects and then accepts him. The intrigues, problems and misunderstandings persist. Tragedies are commonplace in this family, where hidden secrets resurface. Lucía seems lifeless, devoid of happiness. Only she can create her own joy.

== Cast ==
=== Main ===
- Erick Elías as Marcelo Escalante
- Esmeralda Pimentel as Lucía Gaxiola Murillo
- Claudia Ramírez as Rebeca Murillo
- René Strickler as Alonso Gaxiola
- Eugenia Cauduro as Magdalena Murillo

=== Recurring ===
- Helena Rojo as Milagros Fuentes
- Arcelia Ramírez as Sara Ezquerra
- Nuria Bages as Aída Lugo
- Ximena Romo as Nora Gaxiola Murillo
- Mariano Palacios as Rodrigo Zúñiga
- Moisés Arizmendi as Amador Zúñiga
- Monserrat Marañón as Brígida de Zúñiga
- Pablo Valentín as Mario Hernández
- Marcia Coutiño as Lígia Cervantes
- Marcela Morett as Norma "Normita"
- Andrés Almeida as Father Samuel
- Natalia Guerrero as Daniela Suárez
- Lalo España as Eduardo "Lalo" Barragán
- Gloria Izaguirre as Teresa "Tere"
- Arturo Vázquez as Vinicio Garrido
- Harold Azuara as Benito Rosales
- Ilse Ikeda as Leticia "Lety" Ezquerra
- Mauricio Abularach as Sergio Mondragón
- Edsa Ramírez as Gloria Parra
- Luis Gatica as Ricardo Márquez
- Javier Jattin as Román Andrade
- Roberto Blandón as Alfredo Suárez
- Alfonso Dosal as Federico Valdivia
- Maribé Lancioni as Lorena
- Patricia Reyes Spíndola as Trinidad "Trini" de Treviño
- Luis Couturier as Nazario Treviño
- Angelina Peláez as Rafaela Osuna
- Isaura Espinoza as Clara Rosales

=== Guest stars ===
- Ariadne Díaz as Adriana Murillo
- Michelle Renaud as Young Rebeca Murillo
- Luis Fernando Peña as Ruperto
- Horacio Pancheri as Young Alonso Gaxiola
- Ana Isabel Torre as Young Magdalena Murillo
- Rodrigo Massa as Young Amador Zúñiga
- Fernanda Arozqueta as Young Brígida de Zúñiga
- Claudio Roca as Young Mario Hernández
- Nuria Gil as Young Clara Rosales
- Ramón Valera as Young Ricardo Márquez
- Eduardo McGregor as Father Santiago

== Production ==
The telenovela began its production in Puebla on February 4, 2014. On the first day of filming, only the following actors were present: Erick Elías, Esmeralda Pimentel, Claudia Ramírez, René Strickler, Eugenia Cauduro, Ariadne Díaz, Moisés Arizmendi, Lalo España and Luis Couturier.

=== Development ===
For the development of the telenovela, producers decided to set the series in the Mexican province to show the entire world the beautiful landscapes and localities of the country, since Puebla is considered a small Mexican Hollywood.

== Reception ==
=== Ratings ===
The telenovela premiered on March 17, 2014, replacing De que te quiero, te quiero. During its premiere, The Color of Passion recorded 15.5 rating points. On August 31, 2014, its finale reached 22.8 rating points. In the United States, it premiered on September 6, 2016 with 1.9 million viewers.

Season	Timeslot (ET/PT)	Episodes	First aired		Last aired	
Season	Timeslot (ET/PT)	Episodes	Date	Viewers (millions)	Date	Viewers (millions)
1	Mon–Fri 6:20pm	121	March 17, 2014	15.5	August 31, 2014	22.8

== Awards and nominations ==
Year	Association	Category	Nominee(s)	Result
2014	TV Adicto Golden Awards	Best Actor in a Supporting Role	Luis Gatica	Won
2014	TV Adicto Golden Awards	Best Actress in a Supporting Role	Helena Rojo	Won
2014	TV Adicto Golden Awards	Best Male Villain	Moisés Arizmendi	Won
2014	TV Adicto Golden Awards	Best Female Villain	Claudia Ramírez	Won
2014	TV Adicto Golden Awards	Female Revelation	Ximena Romo	Won
2015	TVyNovelas Awards	Best Telenovela	Roberto Gómez Fernández	Nominated
2015	TVyNovelas Awards	Best Actress	Esmeralda Pimentel	Nominated
2015	TVyNovelas Awards	Best Actor	Erick Elías	Nominated
2015	TVyNovelas Awards	Best Antagonist Actress	Claudia Ramírez	Nominated
2015	TVyNovelas Awards	Best Leading Actress	Helena Rojo	Nominated
2015	TVyNovelas Awards	Best Leading Actress	Patricia Reyes Spíndola	Nominated
2015	TVyNovelas Awards	Best Co-lead Actress	Eugenia Cauduro	Nominated
2015	TVyNovelas Awards	Best Co-lead Actor	Pablo Valentín	Nominated
2015	TVyNovelas Awards	Best Young Lead Actress	Michelle Renaud	Nominated
2015	TVyNovelas Awards	Best Musical Theme	"Hoy es un buen día" by Río Roma	Nominated
2015	TVyNovelas Awards	Best Original Story or Adaptation	José Cuauhtémoc Blanco; María del Carmen Peña	Nominated
2015	TVyNovelas Awards	Best Direction	Francisco Franco; Juan Pablo Blanco	Nominated
2015	TVyNovelas Awards	Best Cast	Roberto Gómez Fernández	Nominated
2015	TVyNovelas Awards (Audience's Favorites)	Favorite Finale	Roberto Gómez Fernández	Nominated
2015	TVyNovelas Awards (Audience's Favorites)	The Most Beautiful Woman	Esmeralda Pimentel	Nominated
2015	TVyNovelas Awards (Audience's Favorites)	The Most Beautiful Woman	Michelle Renaud	Nominated
2015	TVyNovelas Awards (Audience's Favorites)	The Most Handsome Man	Erick Elías	Nominated
2015	TVyNovelas Awards (Audience's Favorites)	Favorite Female Villain	Claudia Ramírez	Nominated
2015	TVyNovelas Awards (Audience's Favorites)	Favorite Slap	Claudia Ramírez; Ximena Romo	Nominated
2015	TVyNovelas Awards (Audience's Favorites)	Favorite Slap	Eugenia Cauduro; Claudia Ramírez	Nominated
2015	TVyNovelas Awards (Audience's Favorites)	Favorite Smile	Erick Elías	Nominated
2015	TVyNovelas Awards (Audience's Favorites)	Favorite Smile	Esmeralda Pimentel	Nominated
2015	TVyNovelas Awards (Audience's Favorites)	Favorite Smile	Michelle Renaud	Nominated
2015	TVyNovelas Awards (Audience's Favorites)	Favorite Kiss	Esmeralda Pimentel; Erick Elías	Nominated
2015	TVyNovelas Awards (Audience's Favorites)	Favorite Couple	Esmeralda Pimentel; Erick Elías	Nominated
2018	ASCAP Awards	Best Television Song	"Hoy es un buen día" Composed by: Noel Schajris; Edited by: Sony/ATV Discos Music Publishing	Won
