= How to Kill Mom =

- Theatrical release poster
- Directed by: José Ramón Chávez
- Written by: Carla Sierra
- Produced by: Willy Avellaneda; Ricardo Coeto; Francisco Cordero; Marco Forte; Ale García; Martin Iraola; Penelope Kaufer; Mariana Cerrilla Noriega; Carla Sierra; Antonio Urdapilleta; Ivonne Vela; Francisco Zanabria
- Starring: Ximena Sariñana; Diana Bovio; Ana Valeria Becerril; Blanca Guerra
- Cinematography: Daniel Blanco
- Edited by: Pedro G. García
- Music by: Rodrigo Montfort
- Production companies: Star Distribution; Star Original Productions; BTF Media; La Palma de Oro Films
- Distributed by: Walt Disney Studios Motion Pictures
- Release date: May 10, 2023
- Running time: 95 minutes
- Country: Mexico
- Language: Spanish
- Box office: $1,4 million

How to Kill Mom (Spanish: ¿Cómo matar a mamá?) is a 2023 Mexican road comedy-drama film directed by José Ramón Chávez and written by Carla Sierra. Starring Ximena Sariñana, Diana Bovio, Ana Valeria Becerril and Blanca Guerra, it premiered on May 10, 2023 by Walt Disney Studios Motion Pictures through their Star Distribution and Star Original Productions labels, in Mexican theaters.

== Synopsis ==
Rosalinda suffers dementia, she is in the last moments of her life, but in an instant of lucidity she asks her three daughters to meet for a trip from San Diego to San José del Cabo, the place where she wishes to die.

== Cast ==
- Ximena Sariñana as Margo
- Diana Bovio as Camila
- Ana Valeria Becerril as Teté
- Blanca Guerra as Rosalinda
- Erick Elías as Pablo
- Gonzalo Vega Jr. as Marco
- Antonio Gaona as Fabián
- Elizabeth Guindi as Chivis
- Mau Nieto as Diego
- Esteban de Urquidi as Bellboy
- Efraín Conde Ortiz as Huachicolero
- Esteban López as Bartender
- Carla Viancini as Hostess Altozano
- Alejandro García Guevara as Delivery man
- Virginia Rodriguez Hernández as Paul's mom
- Pao Ortiz as Marta
- Gael Villagrana Cornejo as Rodolfo Margo
- Azul Paola Colín as Marisol
- Leonel Tinajero as Don Poncho
- Marco Hernández as Waiter Mario's Restaurant
- Alex Antuan Careaga as Rodolfo Teté
- Francisco Javier Garcia Camarena as Altozano Security Guard 1
- Miguel Angel Mayoral Rodriguez as Altozano Security Guard 2
