= El hubiera sí existe =

- Theatrical release poster
- Directed by: Luis Eduardo Reyes
- Written by: Adriana Pelusi
- Produced by: Candy Alvarado; Jorge Aragón; Eric Arcos Maldonado; Oscar Salazar; Guadalupe Sosa; Saul Sosa
- Starring: Ana Serradilla; Christopher von Uckermann
- Cinematography: Fido Pérez-Gavilán
- Edited by: Camilo Abadía
- Music by: Rodrigo Dávila
- Production company: Nodancingtoday
- Distributed by: Videocine
- Release date: 25 December 2019 (Mexico)
- Running time: 96 minutes
- Country: Mexico
- Language: Spanish

El hubiera sí existe (formerly known as Ni un minuto que perder) is a 2019 Mexican fantasy romantic comedy-drama film directed by Luis Eduardo Reyes, with a screenplay by Adriana Pelusi. It stars Ana Serradilla, and Christopher von Uckermann as the main's characters. The film is scheduled to premiere on 25 December 2019.

The film finished filming in 2016, and has locations like Mexico City, and Mexico state.

== Plot ==
Elisa (Ana Serradilla) has become a shy, conservative girl, dedicated to her job and avoiding social life. Between her family and her job, the only person she lives with in her routine is Carlos, whom she could consider her best friend. One day Elisa is visited by her future self, who explains that the way to resume her life and find happiness is to lose her fear at work and let herself be found by love.

== Cast ==
- Ana Serradilla as Elisa
  - Ofelia Medina as Adult Elisa
- Christopher von Uckermann as Carlos
- José Carlos Femat as Roberto
- Esmeralda Pimentel as Rosita
- Nico Galán as Diego
- Claudia Ramírez as Guadalupe
- Antonio de la Vega
- Cynthia Rodríguez
- Leonardo de Lozanne
- Jorge Gallegos
- Francisco de la Reguera
