= Estefanía Villarreal =

Mexican actress (born 1987)

Estefania Villarreal
- Born: Estefanía Villarreal Villarreal; March 11, 1987 (age 39); Monterrey, Nuevo León, Mexico
- Occupation: Actress
- Years active: 2004-present

Estefanía Villarreal (born Estefanía Villarreal Villarreal; March 11, 1987) is a Mexican actress, best known for her performance in the Mexican telenovela Rebelde as Celina Ferrer.

While working on Rebelde, she and two other co-stars formed the band Citrus or C3Q's and released the song "No Me Importa" ("I Don't Care").

== Television roles ==
Title	Year	Role
Rebelde	2004 – 2006	Celina Ferrer
La rosa de Guadalupe	2008	Marion
Un refugio para el amor	2012	Tamara
Como dice el dicho	2012	Perla
Camelia la Texana	2014	Mireya Osuna
Yo no creo en los hombres	2014 – 2015	Doris
Despertar contigo	2016 – 2017	Frida
Y mañana será otro día	2018	Nora Sole
Rebelde	2022	Principal Celina Ferrer
Ligeramente diva	2024	Delia Delgado
Doménica Montero	2025	Gina
Polen	2026	Isabella
