= Ligeramente diva =

- Genre: Comedy drama
- Based on: Drop Dead Diva by Josh Berman
- Developed by: Marcela Guerty
- Written by: Marcela Guerty; Cecilia Guerty; Magalli Urquieta; Raúl Olivares
- Directed by: Luis Manzo; Carlos Mario Urrea; Harold Ariza
- Starring: Estefanía Villarreal; Carlos Ferro; Marimar Vega; Roberto Mateos; Mauricio Garza; Fabiola Guajardo
- Theme music composer: Koko Stambuk; Cachorro López
- Opening theme: "Inolvidable" by Reik
- Composer: Camilo Sanabria
- Country of origin: Mexico
- Original language: Spanish
- No. of seasons: 1
- No. of episodes: 60

Production
- Executive producers: Ana Bond; Alejandro García; Néstor Hernández
- Producer: Leonardo Olarte
- Editor: Gerson Aguilar
- Production company: Sony Pictures Television

Original release
- Network: Mercado Play
- Release: 18 June 2024

Ligeramente diva is a Mexican comedy drama television series based on 2009 American television series Drop Dead Diva. It stars Estefanía Villarreal, Carlos Ferro, Marimar Vega and Fabiola Guajardo. Mercado Play released the series on 18 June 2024.

== Plot ==
The series revolves around Vanesa Segura, a beauty influencer who dies in a traffic accident and after being in the afterlife, she returns in the body of Delia Delgado, a lawyer responsible for her accident. Now Vanesa has a second chance at life and to be close to the love of her life, Alejandro Díaz del Castillo, but she faces the challenge of having to live in someone else's body while convincing Alejandro that she is still herself, even though she is in a new body.

== Cast ==
=== Main ===
- Estefanía Villarreal as Delia Delgado
- Carlos Ferro as Alejandro Díaz del Castillo
- Marimar Vega
- Roberto Mateos as Saúl
- Mauricio Garza as Daniel
- Fabiola Guajardo as Vanesa Segura

=== Recurring ===
- Alejandra Duque
- Jaime Correa
- Leonardo Castro
- Johana Villarraga
- Jaime Serrano
- Felipe Ballestas
- Marcela Álvarez
- Luis Miguel Hurtado
- Leónidas Urbina as Cristóbal
- Emoé de la Parra as Lupita Delgado
- María Fernanda García as Romina Delgado
- Cayetano Aramburo as Luciano
- Alfredo Ahnert as Vladimir
- Elsy Reyes as Blanca
- Iñaki Casas as Carlos
- Javier Oliván as Chema
- Danielle Arciniegas as Melissa

== Production ==
Filming of the series began in March 2022 in Bogotá, Colombia, with the series being officially announced on 25 May 2022. Filming concluded in July 2022.

== Release ==
All 60 episodes of the series were released on Mercado Play on 18 June 2024. The series made its broadcast television premiere on Imagen Televisión on 5 November 2024.
