= List of Por ella soy Eva episodes =

Por ella soy Eva (International Title: Me, Her and Eva!, Literal Translation: For Her, I'm Eva) is a Mexican soap opera produced by Rosy Ocampo for Televisa based on the Colombian soap opera En los tacones de Jorge.

== Episodes ==
Air Date	Number	Episode Title	Rating	Duration
February 20, 2012	001	Pierde un negocio importante	28.6	48 minutes
February 21, 2012	002	Proyecto de Playa Mahahua	26.5	52 minutes
February 22, 2012	003	Nace Juan Perón	24.7	49 minutes
February 23, 2012	004	Conoce a Lalito	25.8	50 minutes
February 24, 2012	005	Planes fallidos	23.8	47 minutes
February 27, 2012	006	Helena y Juan Carlos enamorados	23.2	47 minutes
February 28, 2012	007	Confianza	22.4	47 minutes
February 29, 2012	008	Obtiene el proyecto	22.1	45 minutes
March 1, 2012	009	Juan Carlos esta enamorado	23.3	47 minutes
March 2, 2012	010	Dejar marchar	21.0	45 minutes
March 5, 2012	011	Reencuentro en la playa	21.9	46 minutes
March 6, 2012	012	Pedirá su mano	21.8	43 minutes
March 7, 2012	013	Descubren a Juan Carlos	22.9	43 minutes
March 8, 2012	014	Huye de la policía	23.1	44 minutes
March 9, 2012	015	La muerte de Juan Carlos Caballero	22.5	44 minutes
March 12, 2012	016	Encuentra una cómplice	23.1	45 minutes
March 13, 2012	017	Regreso a Grupo Imperio	24.1	44 minutes
March 14, 2012	018	Se busca asistente	23.6	45 minutes
March 15, 2012	019	Eva solicita empleo	25.9	46 minutes
March 16, 2012	020	La nueva asistente de Helena	25.0	43 minutes
March 19, 2012	021	Empresario Diego Fonticoda	23.8	45 minutes
March 20, 2012	022	Lalito se pierde	24.9	45 minutes
March 21, 2012	023	Despide a Eva	25.2	45 minutes
March 22, 2012	024	Desconfía de Plutarco	24.3	45 minutes
March 23, 2012	025	Rebeca celosa	24.1	43 minutes
March 26, 2012	026	El chantaje de Diego	25.1	44 minutes
March 27, 2012	027	Reconocen el trabajo de Helena	25.6	44 minutes
March 28, 2012	028	Eva sospecha de Plutarco y visceversa	25.4	44 minutes
March 29, 2012	029	Comprueba el amor de Juan Carlos	23.7	43 minutes
March 30, 2012	030	Antonia regresa	21.6	44 minutes
April 2, 2012	031	Demanda a su hija	19.3	43 minutes
April 3, 2012	032	Marcela renuncia	21.5	42 minutes
April 4, 2012	033	Quema la tesis	19.9	43 minutes
April 5, 2012	034	Infarto a Eduardo	18.8	43 minutes
April 6, 2012	035	El plan	16.6	43 minutes
April 9, 2012	036	La revelación de Paola	21.3	43 minutes
April 10, 2012	037	Las tentaciones de Juan Carlos	22.4	43 minutes
April 11, 2012	038	Revela que Paola es su novia	22.7	44 minutes
April 12, 2012	039	Antonia descubre las mentiras	24.6	43 minutes
April 13, 2012	040	Antonia corre peligro	24.9	43 minutes
April 16, 2012	041	Antonia pierde la vida	24.1	44 minutes
April 17, 2012	042	Jesús intenta matar a Adriano	26.1	44 minutes
April 18, 2012	043	Buscan el amor	26.2	43 minutes
April 19, 2012	044	Eva hereda acciones	24.3	44 minutes
April 20, 2012	045	Helena enfrenta a Eduardo	23.5	42 minutes
April 23, 2012	046	La historia de Silvia	23.4	43 minutes
April 24, 2012	047	Acepta las acciones	24.8	43 minutes
April 25, 2012	048	El bailarín	23.6	44 minutes
April 26, 2012	049	Nuevo asistente	23.7	44 minutes
April 27, 2012	050	Reunión de mujeres	22.6	43 minutes
April 30, 2012	051	Sentimiento de culpa	N/A	45 minutes
May 1, 2012	052	Mario reaparece	24.1	43 minutes
May 2, 2012	053	Lalito conoce a Mario	23.9	44 minutes
May 3, 2012	054	Defiende a Helena y Lalito	24.1	42 minutes
May 4, 2012	055	Helena deja de ser amiga de Eva	22.4	43 minutes
May 7, 2012	056	Eva descubre a Eugenia	22.6	44 minutes
May 8, 2012	057	Eugenia confía en Eva	23.0	43 minutes
May 9, 2012	058	Planta a Santiago	20.7	44 minutes
May 10, 2012	059	Confesión Amorosa	17.6	42 minutes
May 11, 2012	060	La operación luna de miel de Adriano	22.5	42 minutes
May 14, 2012	061	Se queja de Adriano	23.6	44 minutes
May 15, 2012	062	El secreto de Modesto	23.4	44 minutes
May 16, 2012	063	Conoce más a Eugenia	24.2	43 minutes
May 17, 2012	064	La decepción de Eugenia	21.5	43 minutes
May 18, 2012	065	Helena se decepciona de Juan Carlos	21.6	44 minutes
May 21, 2012	066	Serenata para Eva	23.4	44 minutes
May 22, 2012	067	Prepara una velada romántica	22.8	44 minutes
May 23, 2012	068	Adriano renuncia a todo	23.2	43 minutes
May 24, 2012	069	Helena acepta a Plutarco	23.8	43 minutes
May 25, 2012	070	Eva acepta ser novia de Adriano	22.0	44 minutes
May 28, 2012	071	Grupo Imperio se reestructurará	22.6	44 minutes
May 29, 2012	072	Marcela será jefa de Fernando	23.4	44 minutes
May 30, 2012	073	Rebeca chantajea a Plutarco	23.3	45 minutes
May 31, 2012	074	Plutarco quiere intimidad	22.6	44 minutes
June 1, 2012	075	Noche romántica de Helena y Plutarco	21.5	45 minutes
June 4, 2012	076	Helena en el hospital	24.4	43 minutes
June 5, 2012	077	Renace el amor	24.5	43 minutes
June 6, 2012	078	Comienza la guerra	24.0	44 minutes
June 7, 2012	079	Descubriendo a Juan Carlos y Plutarco	23.9	43 minutes
June 8, 2012	080	Rebeca descubre la verdad	20.9	44 minutes
June 11, 2012	081	Fuertes sospechas de Rebeca	22.3	43 minutes
June 12, 2012	082	Eva en aprietos	22.1	44 minutes
June 13, 2012	083	Mimí toma el lugar de Eva	23.5	45 minutes
June 14, 2012	084	Rebeca le pide perdón a Eva	22.7	43 minutes
June 15, 2012	085	Plutarco le pide matrimonio a Helena	22.5	44 minutes
June 18, 2012	086	Eva se pone borracha	24.0	43 minutes
June 19, 2012	087	Olvidó a Juan Carlos	24.7	43 minutes
June 20, 2012	088	Rebeca le mete cizaña a Helena	23.3	45 minutes
June 21, 2012	089	Eugenia visita Grupo Imperio	23.1	44 minutes
June 22, 2012	090	Helena fija su fecha de boda	21.2	44 minutes
June 25, 2012	091	Se le sube la presión	21.2	44 minutes
June 26, 2012	092	Adriano investiga a Renato	23.5	43 minutes
June 27, 2012	093	Helena se va de viaje	23.3	44 minutes
June 28, 2012	094	Eva desaparece	24.3	43 minutes
June 29, 2012	095	Ya sabe que está vivo	22.7	43 minutes
July 2, 2012	096	Sospechan de Plutarco	22.3	44 minutes
July 3, 2012	097	Debate entre dos amores	23.8	43 minutes
July 4, 2012	098	Juan Carlos pide tiempo	22.2	44 minutes
July 5, 2012	099	Descubre un fraude	23.6	44 minutes
July 6, 2012	100	No denunciará a Fernando	22.7	43 minutes
July 9, 2012	101	Helena desconfía	24.3	43 minutes
July 10, 2012	102	Le cuenta a Eva	N/A	43 minutes
July 11, 2012	103	Planta a Juan Carlos	23.9	43 minutes
July 12, 2012	104	Ayuda a Juan Carlos	25.8	44 minutes
July 13, 2012	105	Relaciones en peligro	N/A	44 minutes
July 16, 2012	106	Le ruega a Eva	24.5	43 minutes
July 17, 2012	107	Helena sospecha de Eva	24.4	44 minutes
July 18, 2012	108	Acusa a Eva	26.0	43 minutes
July 19, 2012	109	Rebeca espía	24.4	43 minutes
July 20, 2012	110	Investigan juntas	23.9	43 minutes
July 23, 2012	111	Irá a Ixtapa	23.1	45 minutes
July 24, 2012	112	Rebeca en Ixtapa	24.0	44 minutes
July 25, 2012	113	Pasión interrumpida	24.1	44 minutes
July 26, 2012	114	Viviendo entre mentiras	23.6	45 minutes
July 27, 2012	115	Celos de Plutarco	20.3	44 minutes
July 30, 2012	116	De amor y amistad	22.4	44 minutes
July 31, 2012	117	Rechaza el regalo	22.4	44 minutes
August 1, 2012	118	Hijo perdido	23.4	44 minutes
August 2, 2012	119	Juan Carlos descubre a su hermano	25.4	44 minutes
August 3, 2012	120	Carmen muere	22.5	43 minutes
August 6, 2012	121	Rencores de hijo	24.2	44 minutes
August 7, 2012	122	Problemas con la constructora	23.6	43 minutes
August 8, 2012	123	Caos en conferencia	24.6	44 minutes
August 9, 2012	124	Dispuesto a enfrentarlos	24.9	43 minutes
August 10, 2012	125	Helena duda de casarse	24.7	43 minutes
August 13, 2012	126	Terminan con Plutarco y Eduardo	23.2	44 minutes
August 14, 2012	127	Eugenia perdida	24.3	44 minutes
August 15, 2012	128	Se alía con Eduardo	21.0	43 minutes
August 16, 2012	129	Intercede por Plutarco	23.5	44 minutes
August 17, 2012	130	Plutarco amenaza a Eva	N/A	43 minutes
August 20, 2012	131	Fernando confiesa	N/A	44 minutes
August 21, 2012	132	Conquistar a Eva	25.0	43 minutes
August 22, 2012	133	Tesis distinta	23.7	44 minutes
August 23, 2012	134	Lección para Félix	23.5	43 minutes
August 24, 2012	135	Harta de Plutarco	22.3	44 minutes
August 27, 2012	136	Descubre más engaños	N/A	44 minutes
August 28, 2012	137	Los celos de Adriano	24.3	43 minutes
August 29, 2012	138	Plutarco sigue insistiendo	26.3	44 minutes
August 30, 2012	139	Helena y Juan Carlos se reconcilian	24.5	43 minutes
August 31, 2012	140	Eva se arrepiente de decir la verdad	24.9	43 minutes
September 3, 2012	141	Modesto descubre a Renato	23.8	45 minutes
September 4, 2012	142	Quiere hundir a Helena	26.3	42 minutes
September 5, 2012	143	La verdadera Eva	24.3	43 minutes
September 6, 2012	144	Seguir a Helena	24.1	42 minutes
September 7, 2012	145	Persigue al fotógrafo	23.0	44 minutes
September 10, 2012	146	Eva conoce a la verdadera Eva	25.1	44 minutes
September 11, 2012	147	Quiere desenmascarar a Eva	24.2	43 minutes
September 12, 2012	148	Plutarco despedirá a Rebeca	24.0	42 minutes
September 13, 2012	149	Rebeca fuera de Grupo Imperio	24.9	42 minutes
September 14, 2012	150	Fernando sinvergüenza	24.1	42 minutes
September 17, 2012	151	Yadhira Rivers es detenida	23.1	43 minutes
September 18, 2012	152	Plutarco amenaza a Helena	23.0	43 minutes
September 19, 2012	153	Mimí decide irse	23.8	43 minutes
September 20, 2012	154	Daniel intenta violar a Jennifer	25.0	43 minutes
September 21, 2012	155	Renato acusa a Helena de fraude	24.2	44 minutes
September 24, 2012	156	Eva embarazada	25.2	44 minutes
September 25, 2012	157	Mendoza descubre a Juan Carlos	26.7	44 minutes
September 26, 2012	158	Se reunen los 3 mosqueteros	27.3	44 minutes
September 27, 2012	159	Eva "Mujer del año"	26.4	43 minutes
September 28, 2012	160	Sabe la verdad de Renato	25.5	44 minutes
October 1, 2012	161	Desaparecer a Eva	26.8	44 minutes
October 2, 2012	162	La boda de Eva y Adriano	27.4	44 minutes
October 3, 2012	163	Adriano sufre otro infarto	28.6	43 minutes
October 4, 2012	164	Adriano muere	28.6	44 minutes
October 5, 2012	165	Grupo Imperio será vendido	29.5	44 minutes
October 7, 2012	166	Gran Final Parte 1 Gran Final Parte 2	31.0	41 minutes 47 minutes
October 7, 2012	Special episode	Rumbo al final: Por ella soy Eva	18.2	44 minutes
