= La Jefa (TV series) =

- Genre: Drama
- Based on: Señora Acero by Roberto Stopello
- Developed by: José Vicente Spataro
- Directed by: Mauricio Corredor; Mauricio Meneses; Laura Marco Lavilla
- Starring: Fabiola Guajardo; Iván Arana; Mauricio Henao; Azela Robinson
- Theme music composer: Fabiola Guajardo; Amanda Coronel; Mónica Vélez; Nadir Cortés García
- Opening theme: "La que manda" by Adriana Ríos
- Composers: Elik Álvarez; Juan Andrés Cammarano
- Country of origin: United States
- Original language: Spanish
- No. of seasons: 1
- No. of episodes: 95

Production
- Executive producer: Mónica Vizzi
- Producers: Mabel Vargas; Néstor Duque
- Editors: Ramiro Pardo; Leandro Tizzano; Laura Pallotini; Mariano Saban; Jean Carlo Loor; Nadia Gagna; Marvin Benitez
- Production company: Telemundo Studios

Original release
- Network: Telemundo
- Release: 18 February – 11 July 2025

La Jefa is an American television series developed by José Vicente Spataro. It is a reboot of Señora Acero created by Roberto Stopello, which aired from 2014 to 2019. The series stars Fabiola Guajardo, Iván Arana, and Mauricio Henao. It aired on Telemundo from 18 February 2025 to 11 July 2025.

== Cast ==
=== Main ===
- Fabiola Guajardo as Gloria Guzmán
- Iván Arana as Eduardo Torres
- Mauricio Henao as Mateo Restrepo
- Azela Robinson as Maribel Ortiz
- Andrés Almeida as Jacinto Ortega
- Verónica Merchant as Matilde de Guzmán
- Pepe Gámez as Sebastián Cruz
- Yany Prado as Yadira Castro
- José María Galeano as Duque Medina
- Guillermo Quintanilla as Venancio Estrada
- Sara Corrales as Laura Rojas
- Jesús Moré as Mauricio Domínguez
- Jorge Luis Moreno as Ignacio Pérez "Don Nacho"
- Dante Aguiar as Daniel Cruz Guzmán
- Sachi Tamashiro as Ernestina Guzmán
- Laura Vignatti as Luisa Guzmán
- Julieta Grajales as Sonia de Fierro
- Uriel del Toro as Gabriel Rondón "El Cuervo"
- Gary Centeno as Gael Vargas
- Pakey Vázquez as Perrón
- Nahuel Escobar as Fercho
- Alejandra Lazcano as Verónica Ramos
- Rodolfo Valdés as Fernando
- Mayra Batalla as Ramona Muñoz
- Fernando Cuautle as Morrillo
- Ana Pau Castell as Susana Méndez
- Alfredo Gatica
- Jorge Luis Vázquez
- Mario Alberto Monroy as Marco
- Pablo Astiazarán

=== Recurring and guest stars ===
- Cristián de la Fuente as Juan José Cruz
- Aldo Lira as Ivancito
- Carlos Pohls as Bernardo
- Ezequiel Cardenas as Doctor
- Joanydka Mariel as Amparo
- Jonathan Ontiveros as Facundo
- Luis Ernesto Verdín as Marlin
- Mar Arostegui as Karen Carmona
- Renata Zalvidea as Olga Piñeros

== Production ==
On 9 May 2024, Telemundo announced that a reboot of Señora Acero was in development, under the working title Perseguida. Filming began on 24 October 2024, with La Jefa being announced as the title of the series. That same day, the cast was revealed.

== Episodes ==
No.	Title	Original air date
1	"La mujer de Fierro"	18 February 2025
2	"Marcada de por vida"	19 February 2025
3	"Enemigos en la familia"	20 February 2025
4	"Eres mía"	21 February 2025
5	"Cacería"	24 February 2025
6	"Dónde está la otra parte"	25 February 2025
7	"Nos vamos lejos"	26 February 2025
8	"Caminos inesperados"	27 February 2025
9	"Otro duro golpe"	28 February 2025
10	"Un supuesto enemigo"	3 March 2025
11	"Los Cruz no se quiebran"	5 March 2025
12	"Soy otra mujer"	6 March 2025
13	"Volver al infierno"	7 March 2025
14	"No soy una asesina"	10 March 2025
15	"Emergencia familiar"	11 March 2025
16	"Te quedaste sin madre"	12 March 2025
17	"Yo sí te creo"	13 March 2025
18	"Bajo amenaza"	14 March 2025
19	"Hay que eliminar a todos los Fierro"	17 March 2025
20	"No quiero esperar"	18 March 2025
21	"Carrera contra el tiempo"	19 March 2025
22	"La nueva enemiga"	21 March 2025
23	"Rosas con espinas"	24 March 2025
24	"Mentiras y dinero"	25 March 2025
25	"La hija más débil"	26 March 2025
26	"Amenazas y decepciones"	27 March 2025
27	"Nueva traición"	28 March 2025
28	"Más verdades salen a la luz"	31 March 2025
29	"No hay vuelta atrás"	1 April 2025
30	"Yo me encargo"	2 April 2025
31	"El nuevo socio"	3 April 2025
32	"El trasplante"	4 April 2025
33	"Vender el alma al diablo"	7 April 2025
34	"Deudas pendientes"	8 April 2025
35	"Un futuro juntos"	9 April 2025
36	"Ya pagué mi deuda"	10 April 2025
37	"La hora de la venganza"	11 April 2025
38	"La muerte ronda"	14 April 2025
39	"Advertencia mortal"	15 April 2025
40	"Descansa en paz"	16 April 2025
41	"Una nueva vida"	17 April 2025
42	"Nuevos negocios"	18 April 2025
43	"¿Quién quiere entrarle al negocio?"	22 April 2025
44	"Nos retiramos del negocio"	23 April 2025
45	"El traslado"	25 April 2025
46	"Favores mortales"	28 April 2025
47	"El destino no perdona"	30 April 2025
48	"Jugarse la vida por los hijos"	1 May 2025
49	"Pactos mortales"	2 May 2025
50	"El jefe de jefes"	5 May 2025
51	"Volverte a ver"	6 May 2025
52	"Matrimonio y mortaja"	7 May 2025
53	"El último adiós"	8 May 2025
54	"Viuda otra vez"	9 May 2025
55	"Esa sí es Gloria"	12 May 2025
56	"Los dos dedos"	13 May 2025
57	"Carrera a la Gloria"	14 May 2025
58	"Bienvenida a Cali"	15 May 2025
59	"Un nuevo amor en Cali"	16 May 2025
60	"En ésta no fue"	19 May 2025
61	"La verdad de Gloria"	20 May 2025
62	"El enemigo en casa"	21 May 2025
63	"Dos pájaros de un tiro"	22 May 2025
64	"Lavando el corazón"	23 May 2025
65	"Al rescate"	26 May 2025
66	"Propuestas indecentes"	27 May 2025
67	"Mi hermana, mi enemiga"	28 May 2025
68	"Sacando a los traidores del medio"	29 May 2025
69	"La trampa"	30 May 2025
70	"Dinero robado"	3 June 2025
71	"La muerte la persigue"	4 June 2025
72	"Un enemigo menos"	5 June 2025
73	"La traición"	9 June 2025
74	"No soy una mujer cualquiera"	11 June 2025
75	"El traidor"	12 June 2025
76	"La verdad de Mateo"	13 June 2025
77	"Una cita con el destino"	16 June 2025
79	"Una bala para Gloria"	18 June 2025
80	"Un dolor en el corazón"	19 June 2025
81	"Visitas sorpresa"	20 June 2025
82	"Buscando aliados"	23 June 2025
83	"El plan de Gloria"	24 June 2025
84	"La fuga"	25 June 2025
85	"La guerra del fin del mundo"	26 June 2025
86	"La cabeza de Gloria tiene precio"	27 June 2025
87	"Vivir escondidos"	30 June 2025
88	"Encontrar a Gloria"	1 July 2025
89	"¿Dónde está Laura?"	2 July 2025
90	"Amigos contra enemigos"	3 July 2025
91	"Mi vida por la suya"	7 July 2025
92	"La verdad de Don Nacho"	8 July 2025
93	"Marido y mujer"	9 July 2025
94	"Me dicen La Jefa"	10 July 2025
95	"El futuro de Gloria"	11 July 2025

== Reception ==
=== Ratings ===
Viewership and ratings per season of La Jefa
Season	Timeslot (ET)	Episodes	First aired		Last aired		Avg. viewers (millions)
Season	Timeslot (ET)	Episodes	Date	Viewers (millions)	Date	Viewers (millions)	Avg. viewers (millions)
1	Mon–Fri 10:00 p.m.	95	18 February 2025	N/A	11 July 2025	0.96	0.86

=== Awards and nominations ===
Year	Award	Category	Nominated	Result	Ref
2025	Produ Awards	Best Lead Actress - Contemporary Telenovela	Fabiola Guajardo	Nominated	
