= Fabiola Guajardo =

Mexican actress, model, author and musician

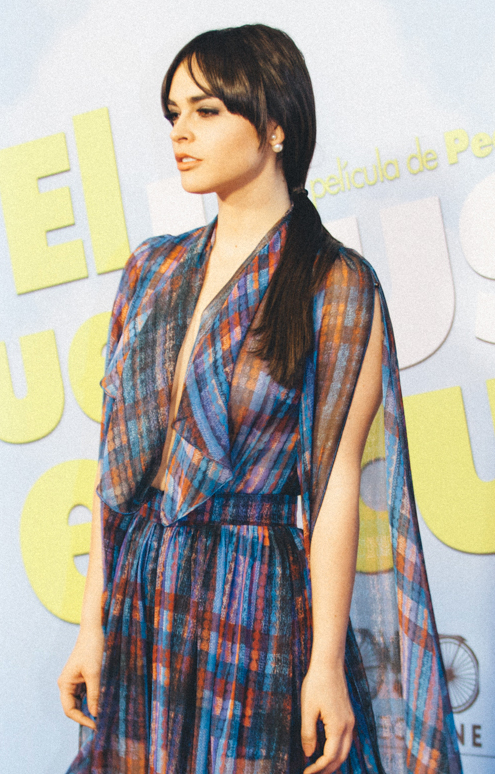
- Born: Fabiola Jazmin Guajardo Martínez; January 5, 1988 (age 38); Monterrey, Nuevo León, Mexico
- Occupations: Actress; model; author; musician
- Years active: 2011–present

Fabiola Guajardo (born Fabiola Jazmin Guajardo Martínez; January 5, 1988) is a Mexican actress, model, author and musician, known for having competed in Nuestra Belleza Nuevo León 2007 finishing as the first runner up and being finalist on the National pageant of Nuestra Belleza Mexico in 2007.

== Biography ==
Guajardo was born on January 5, 1988, in Monterrey. In 2011, she made her television debut on Esperanza del Corazón where she had a minor role. She then moved on to play the part of Paola in Por Ella Soy Eva in early 2012. In September 2012, Guajardo played the role of Norma in Corona de lágrimas alongside Victoria Ruffo and Maribel Guardia. She is best known for playing Brigitte Garcia Pabuena in Televisa's successful telenovela De que te quiero, te quiero.

In 2014, Guajardo played a role in Televisa's telenovela, Yo no creo en los hombres alongside Adriana Louvier and Gabriel Soto, for which she won the TVyNovelas Award for Best Co-star Actress. She played the role of Gabriela Diaz in Pasión y Poder for which she won the TVyNovelas Award for Best Supporting Actress. She had a minor appearance in La Candidata. Guajardo was cast in Enamorándome de Ramón in late 2016.

== Filmography ==
Film roles
| Year | Title | Roles | Notes |
|---|---|---|---|
| 2016 | ¿Qué culpa tiene el niño? | Daniela | |
| 2016 | El Alien y yo | Groupie 2 | |
| 2018 | Ni tú ni yo | Actress | |
| 2021 | El Amarre | Elena | |
| 2022 | Bardo, False Chronicle of a Handful of Truths | Tania | |

Television roles
| Year | Title | Roles | Notes |
|---|---|---|---|
| 2011 | Triunfo del amor | Fabby | |
| 2012 | Café Cea | Brenda | Television film |
| 2012 | Por ella soy Eva | Paola | Series regular; 66 episodes |
| 2012–2013 | Corona de lágrimas | Norma | Series regular; 51 episodes |
| 2013 | Nueva vida | Unknown role | Episode: "Todos mis hijos" |
| 2013–2014 | De que te quiero, te quiero | Brigitte | Series regular; 172 episodes |
| 2014–2015 | Yo no creo en los hombres | Isela | Series regular; 118 episodes |
| 2015 | Yo no creo en los hombres, el origen | Isela | Television film |
| 2015–2016 | Pasión y poder | Gabriela | Series regular; 131 episodes |
| 2016 | 40 y 20 | Xóchitl | Episode: "La amante de lo ajeno" |
| 2016 | La candidata | Florencia | Episode: "Buscando un culpable" |
| 2017 | Érase una vez | Diana | Episode: "El Príncipe y Mendigo" |
| 2017 | Enamorándome de Ramón | Sofía | Series regular; 90 episodes |
| 2019 | Preso No. 1 | Young Carolina Arteaga | 17 episodes |
| 2021 | Buscando a Frida | Detective Silvia | Series regular |
| 2022 | Los ricos tambien lloran | Soraya Montenegro | Series regular |
| 2024 | La historia de Juana | Camila Montes | Series regular |
| 2024 | Ligeramente diva | Vanesa Segura | |
| 2025 | La Jefa | Gloria Guzmán | Lead role |
| 2026 | Polen | Alejandra | Series regular |
| 2026 | ¿Quién es la máscara? | Fifi Ñera | Season 8 contestant |
