= The Angel in the Clock =

El ángel en el reloj
- Theatrical release poster
- Directed by: Miguel Ángel Uriegas
- Written by: Miguel Ángel Uriegas; Rosana Curiel; Miguel Bonilla
- Produced by: Jaime Romandia; Miguel Ángel Uriegas
- Starring: Zoe Mora; Camila Sodi; Erick Elías; Laura Flores; Leonardo de Lozanne; Mario Arvizu
- Edited by: Roberto Almeida
- Music by: Manuel Vázquez
- Production company: Fotosíntesis Media
- Release dates: October 2017 (Morelia Film Festival); May 25, 2018
- Running time: 91 minutes
- Country: Mexico
- Language: Spanish

The Angel in the Clock (Spanish: El ángel en el reloj) is a 2017 Mexican animated adventure fantasy film directed by Miguel Ángel Uriegas and written by Uriegas, Rosana Curiel, and Miguel Bonilla. It was produced by the Fotosíntesis Media Studio, the studio's first film.

== Synopsis ==
Set in contemporary Mexico, the film presents Amelia as a happy and mischievous little girl. Her wish is to be able to stop time, because she has been diagnosed with leukemia.

In the quest to reach her goal, Amelia meets Malachi, an angel who lives inside her cuckoo clock. Malachi takes Amelia through the Fields of Time. Amelia is accompanied by the fairies 'Here' and 'Now.' Amelia accidentally breaks the angel clock, severely damaging her time. Amelia then seeks the help of master watchmaker Balzac the bear. Through her adventure, Amelia is deceived by Captain Manecilla and faces the terrible villain named 'No time.' Through great sacrifices, Amelia finally discovers the value of living in the present.

== Cast ==
- Zoe Mora as Amelia
- Camila Sodi as Martina
- Erick Elías as Alejandro, Amelia's father
- Laura Flores as Ana, Amelia's mother
- Leonardo de Lozanne as Malaki
- Mario Arvizu as Balzac

== Production ==
Development began in 2017, with a budget of $2 million. The film was created to help children with cancer.

== Release ==
The Angel in the Clock premiered in theaters in Mexico on May 25, 2018.

== Reception ==
Proceso's Fausto Ponce and 20 minutos's Paula Arantzazu Ruiz commended on the film's positive message about the importance of living in the moment. However, Ponce noted that the script was a bit complicated, and the animation quality was not up to par with that of Hollywood films.
