= La historia de Juana =

- Genre: Telenovela
- Based on: Juana la virgen by Perla Farías
- Written by: Perla Farías; Verónica Suárez; Basilio Álvarez; Felipe Silva
- Directed by: Rolando Ocampo; Luis Manzo; Carlos Santos
- Starring: Camila Valero; Brandon Peniche; Fabiola Guajardo; Cynthia Klitbo; Irina Baeva
- Theme music composer: Benjamín Eli Cordero; Álvaro José Valencia
- Opening theme: "La historia de Juana" by Benjamín Eli Cordero
- Composers: Álvaro José Valencia Abello; Daniel Obregón; Salvador Cartas Güereña
- Country of origin: Mexico
- Original language: Spanish
- No. of seasons: 1
- No. of episodes: 65

Production
- Executive producer: Patricio Wills
- Producer: Jorge Sastoque Roa
- Editor: Víctor Manuel Ruíz Benavides
- Camera setup: Multi-camera
- Production companies: W Studios; TelevisaUnivision

Original release
- Network: Las Estrellas
- Release: 3 June – 30 August 2024

Related
- La virgen de la calle; Jane the Virgin

La historia de Juana (English: Juana's Story) is a Mexican telenovela produced by W Studios for TelevisaUnivision. It is based on the 2002 Venezuelan telenovela Juana la virgen, created by Perla Farías. The series stars Camila Valero as the title character, alongside Brandon Peniche. It aired on Las Estrellas from 3 June 2024 to 30 August 2024.

== Plot ==
Juana Guadalupe Bravo is a charming and daring twenty year old virgin whose goal is to graduate with a degree in engineering. She is the first woman in her family to go to college and only thinks of improving her life. During a health checkup, she mistakenly gets pregnant through a process of artificial insemination. Juana's life is turned upside down and she has to learn to experience motherhood without first having had the experience of being a woman or falling in love. The baby's father is Gabriel Rubio, a powerful man who has recently survived cancer. This experience makes him rethink his life and his goals as he realizes that he is missing something that makes him feel that his life will continue after his death: a child.

== Cast ==
=== Main ===
- Camila Valero as Juana Guadalupe Bravo
- Brandon Peniche as Gabriel Rubio
- Fabiola Guajardo as Camila Montes
- Cynthia Klitbo as Josefina Sosa de Bravo
- Irina Baeva as Paula Fuenmayor
- Grettell Valdez as Jenny Bravo
- Mario Morán as Felipe Bravo
- Henry Zakka as Guillermo
- Moisés Arizmendi as Salvador Castillo
- Omar Germenos as Carlos Poza
- Carlos Gatica as David Ayala
- Daniela Cordero as Enriqueta Valdez
- Luis Gatica as Ramón Bravo
- Valentina Buzzurro as Margarita Bravo
- Issabela Camil as Amparo Robledo
- Federico Espejo as Manuel Fuenmayor
- Gabriela Carrillo as Inés Campos
- Natalia Payán as Daniela Rojas
- Ara Saldívar as Yadira Soto
- Paly Duval as Viviana Sola
- Daniela Cristo as Susana Ramírez
- David Lopez as César
- Juanjo Ramosanz as Pepito
- Alexis Ayala as Rogelio Fuenmayor

=== Recurring and guest stars ===
- Diego Klein as Francisco
- Anilú Pardo
- Enrique Chi
- Miguel Salas as Dr. Ruiz
- Víctor Oliveira
- Lilia Navarro
- Pancho Tello as Julián Torres
- Roger Montes
- Julia Díaz
- Valentina Girón
- Camila Acosta as Lily
- Diego Valle
- Mariana Lodoza
- Daniela Romero
- Mariana Almazzi
- Diego Medellín
- Carlos Ferro as Bruno
- Arturo Peniche as Prison doctor
- Stephanie Salas as Civil registry judge

== Production ==
Filming of La historia de Juana began on 5 December 2023. A complete cast list was published the following day. The telenovela has 65 episodes confirmed for broadcast.

== Ratings ==
Viewership and ratings per season of La historia de Juana
Season	Timeslot (CT)	Episodes	First aired		Last aired		Avg. viewers (millions)
Season	Timeslot (CT)	Episodes	Date	Viewers (millions)	Date	Viewers (millions)	Avg. viewers (millions)
1	Mon–Fri 9:30 p.m.	65	3 June 2024	2.79	30 August 2024	3.03	2.54

== Episodes ==
No.	Title	Original release date	Mexico viewers (millions)
1	"Juana la Virgen"	3 June 2024 (Note: Premiered early online through Las Estrellas website on 31 May 2024.)	2.79
Juana goes for a routine check-up with the gynecologist, but ends up being inseminated by mistake. Paula confesses how annoying Gabriel's desire to be a father is, since she has never been interested in starting a family. Dr. Méndez warns Gabriel that the insemination performed on Rosa is his last hope to become a father. Juana visits the Rubio brewery and accidentally meets Gabriel, who is intrigued by her beauty. Juana gets her blood tests results and receives the unexpected news that she is pregnant.
2	"No traicionaré a mi mejor amigo"	4 June 2024	2.64
Josefina is afraid that Juana has become ill from eating poorly so that she can devote herself to studying. Francisco threatens to sell his share of the company to Rogelio's friends unless Gabriel can match the offer. Juana's motorcycle loses its brakes just as she arrives at Gabriel's house and he saves her from crashing. Francisco is determined to tell Gabriel all about Rogelio's fraud but is interrupted by a warning about the recent insecurity. Rogelio confesses to Francisco his plan to take over the company and murders him; Juana discovers the crime scene.
3	"El sueño de ser padre"	5 June 2024	2.83
Juana takes Gabriel to the scene of the crime and is surprised to see that it is completely clean, making her look like a liar in front of Gabriel. David offers his support to Juana to take her back home; upon seeing him, Jenny sees him as the perfect suitor for her daughter. Rogelio takes advantage of Francisco's disappearance to go ahead with his plan to pursue Camila. Rosa miscarries Gabriel's child. Juana receives confirmation that according to her blood tests, she is pregnant and still not believing it, she buys a test to verify the result. Juana climbs up to the roof in search of fresh air and Gabriel, confused, runs to her rescue to avoid a tragedy.
4	"La maldición de la familia"	6 June 2024	2.69
Juana and Gabriel discover that they have more in common than they imagined as they support each other in dealing with their respective problems. Paula celebrates that she will no longer be a mother and will be able to enjoy the carefree life she is used to. Juana assures that the Bravo women are destined to suffer from love and regrets not having been able to end the curse. Berto's daughters make a scandal outside Jenny's house to get her to stay away from their father. Gabriel doubts Paula's love when he discovers that motherhood is not in her plans.
5	"Por obra y gracia del Espíritu Santo"	7 June 2024	2.41
Paula tries to reconcile with Gabriel, but discovers that he is facing a bigger problem than she thought. Juana summons the courage to announce to the family the news that she is expecting a child, Josefina complains to her for getting pregnant and ruining all the plans she had made for her. Paula spoils herself with lavish gifts to make Gabriel pay for his disdain. David visits Juana and Josefina suspects that he may have been the one who impregnated her.
6	"Pasamos la noche juntos"	10 June 2024	2.46
Juana offers to cook for Gabriel as a way of thanking him for allowing her to spend the night at the brewery. Paula worries that Gabriel has met someone else and that this is the real reason he wants to divorce her. Juana cannot hide the love she feels for Gabriel after spending an incredible night by his side. Juana and Gabriel are seen by some of the company's employees and end up being the subject of assumptions. Juana explains to Jenny her theory of how she got pregnant without having been involved with a man.
7	"Te embarazamos por error"	11 June 2024	2.38
Paula attends the meeting of the charity ladies and meets Nicolás, who seems perfect for her as an adopted son. Camila decides to do everything in her power to sabotage Paula's marriage so she can keep Gabriel and the Rubio family fortune. David complains to Juana for not having warned him about her relationship with Gabriel. Josefina again demands an explanation from Juana regarding her pregnancy, but Jenny defends her by supporting her daughter's story. Juana and Jenny find the nurse who attended her, forcing her to confess that she was inseminated by mistake.
8	"A lo hecho, pecho"	12 June 2024	2.78
Carmen warns Juana that the father of her child is a very powerful man who would be willing to pay any price to carry her pregnancy successfully. Felipe warns the family that they don't know what to expect from his nephew's father if he is as powerful a man as they were told. Fearing being reported, Dr. Ruiz goes ahead of Carmen and blames her for mistakenly inseminating Juana. Carlos does not forget the terrible history between the brewery and Rogelio's family, so he is suspicious of their intentions. Gabriel gives Juana back her fixed motorcycle and completes the surprise with a ride for the two of them.
9	"No nací para ser engañada"	13 June 2024	2.51
Salvador interrupts his investigation when he meets Jenny, but she shows no interest in getting involved with him. Juana confesses to Gabriel that he has proven to be the kind of person she has wanted all her life. Rogelio manages to clear himself of any suspicion for Francisco's disappearance by pointing out that he may have been a victim of Gabriel's rage. Manuel warns Paula about Gabriel's alleged infidelity with Juana. Arturo informs Gabriel that the clinic mistakenly inseminated another patient, who is expecting his child.
10	"Necesito encontrarla"	14 June 2024	2.56
Juana asks the Virgin Mary to send her a sign that will make it easier for her to make a decision regarding her pregnancy. Paula points out the suspicious way in which Juana has managed to break into her life and hints to Salvador that she might be behind Francisco's disappearance. Gabriel confesses to Carlos the news of an unknown woman carrying his child and his haste to find her. Salvador summons Juana to Gabriel's house to continue the investigations and immediately, Camila warns Paula to hurry back home. Juana assures that Gabriel is innocent of any crime and is willing to cooperate in any way necessary to prove it.
11	"La manzana de la discordia"	17 June 2024	2.65
Gabriel points out to Juana that, without realizing it, her heart has already made a decision about what to do with her pregnancy. Due to Paula's jealousy, suspicions grow that Gabriel may have been behind Francisco's disappearance. Juana confesses to Dany that if she decided to give her baby up for adoption, she would definitely leave him in Gabriel's care. Josefina gets angry with Dany for putting ideas into Juana's head about her pregnancy, but Juana assures her that she has already made a firm decision on the matter. Paula uses Nicolás to get Gabriel to accept his adoption and thus keep their marriage together.
12	"Una mujer está embarazada de mí"	18 June 2024	2.58
Gabriel has work to attend to, but Paula calls him out for not spending a family moment; he does not intend to fall for her charade. David apologizes to Juana for the mistakes he made and admits that he does not want to lose her friendship. Camila is willing to take advantage of her position at the brewery to be Paula's eyes and find out what is going on between Gabriel and Juana. Felipe needs to deliver the keys of a car, but an elevator malfunction causes him to meet an attractive woman. Paula wants to know the reasons why Gabriel hired a detective, he has no choice but to confess to her that there is a woman who got pregnant with his child by mistake.
13	"Me gusta estar cerca de Juana"	19 June 2024	2.52
Paula believes that the Gabriel's search may affect their relationship and he will forget about her to focus on his paternity. Camila ruins the papers confirming the identity of the mother of Gabriel's son. Rogelio sets a trap for Camila and thus takes revenge for everything he has done for her. Elvira's presence in the company causes Rogelio to be blamed by his son for Francisco's murder. Gabriel asks David to hire Juana for the position of designer because he knows how good it is for her to be close to him.
14	"La futura madre de su hijo"	20 June 2024	2.69
Juana confesses to her mom that she got a job, but the happiness ends when she finds out that it is at the brewery. Paula confesses to Camila that Gabriel is investigating who is the mother of his future son, but Camila remembers that it is about the papers she ruined. Gabriel finds the documents left by the detective, but it is impossible to recognize the composite sketch. Paula is reunited with Luciano, an old acquaintance from the past and has an affair since Gabriel has abandoned her as a woman. The detective summons Gabriel to show him the images of his son's mother and is surprised to discover that it is Juana.
15	"Estoy perdidamente enamorada de ti"	21 June 2024	2.42
After learning that Juana is the mother of his son, Gabriel asks the detective to keep this news a secret, especially from Paula. Camila discovers that Juana now works at the brewery and warns her that she will be watching her closely. Gabriel asks to speak to Juana to explain his son's situation, but everything gets out of control when she admits that she is falling in love with him. Juana can no longer stand to be around Gabriel and decides to resign from her position as a designer at the brewery. Paula visits Juana at her house and warns her that she will show no mercy if she does not disappear from their lives.
16	"El amor llega"	24 June 2024	2.84
Despite Paula's complaints, Gabriel decides to talk to Juana about the problems around them. Juana admits that she can't stop thinking about Gabriel, he concedes that she is also very important in his life. Camila asks Paula to investigate who Gabriel son's mother is in order to get Juana away from Gabriel, but Paula admits that it is impossible. Gabriel cannot hide his feelings for Juana, but he is afraid that Paula might discover his secret. Paula seeks out Gabriel and questions him about who his son's mother is.
17	"Paula, quiero el divorcio"	25 June 2024	2.52
Paula tries to win Gabriel back, but is surprised when he asks her for a divorce because he feels it is best for both of them. While Jenny seems to be won over by Ricardo, Salvador does not give up and wants a date with her. Rogelio looks for Camila at Paula's house and kisses her only to be surprised by Paula. Enriqueta is sure that Gabriel's closeness with Juana is due to her pregnancy. After Paula throws her out of her house, Camila looks for Gabriel to clear up the misunderstanding.
18	"El enigma de Gabriel"	26 June 2024	2.59
David discovers that Juana is pregnant and when asked if Gabriel knew about this, she confirms it. Camila decides to ally with Rogelio to become the owners of the brewery. During a meeting at the company, Gabriel ignores Juana's comments and this gives the employees something to talk about. Camila finds by mistake the magazine where it is revealed that Juana is pregnant and confronts Gabriel to see if the child is his.
19	"Juana es la persona más importante que tengo en la vida"	27 June 2024	2.77
Camila tries to seduce Gabriel after revealing that she already knows his secret. In the middle of an argument, Camila confesses to Paula that there are secrets in her relationship with Gabriel. Everyone in the office finds out about Juana's pregnancy from the magazine she was featured in and she confronts her colleagues. Josefina arrives at the Rubio brewery to ask Gabriel to stop deceiving Juana. Despite Josefina's warning and outrage, Gabriel wants to stay by Juana and her son's side.
20	"Nunca me había sentido así"	28 June 2024	2.68
Gabriel decides to take Juana to a place where she can forget about the scandal at the office. Juana opens her heart and confesses to Gabriel that the child she is expecting is the result of an artificial insemination, but he avoids the subject. In the middle of the storm, Juana and Gabriel arrive at the Rubio family's cabin and their gazes cannot hide their feelings. Rogelio orders his son to introduce a bacterium into the brewery and send the company to its ruin. Juana gets ready to have dinner with Gabriel, but he is shocked to see her in her outfit.
21	"Nunca había sentido tanto con un beso"	1 July 2024	2.69
Camila explains to Paula that Gabriel's only reason for approaching Juana is the child they are expecting. Juana seeks out Gabriel in the middle of the night and he takes the opportunity to kiss her, but later regrets it. Jenny points out Josefina's mistake in trying to match her entire family with the person she thinks is right for each of them. Due to Manuel's intervention in the beer formula, Rogelio celebrates that the brewery will go bankrupt.
22	"Un corazón fuerte"	2 July 2024	2.67
Juana accepts Gabriel's company during the ultrasound and the sound of her son's heart moves them to tears. Juana is surprised by Gabriel's reaction to hearing the doctor's concern about the health of the pregnancy. Juana and Gabriel become the target of gossip when they arrive at the office, because besides arriving together, they are wearing the same clothes from the day before. Worried about her daughter, Jenny asks Juana for a reason for spending the night away from home with a married man. Paula visits the brewery and teases Juana, making it clear that she will always be Gabriel's wife.
23	"El documento es apócrifo"	3 July 2024	2.39
Rogelio tries to humiliate Juana in order to put her in her place, but she proves that she won't let anyone walk over her. Salvador warns Camila about inconsistencies in her story that lead him to believe that she might be connected to Francisco's disappearance. Paula organizes a charity event at her house and looks for a way to force Juana to attend in order to taunt her. Ramón overhears Josefina talking about him to her children and discovers the deep hatred she feels for him since he abandoned his family.
24	"Enferma de enojo"	4 July 2024	2.70
Jenny offends Josefina as never before for having prevented her from reuniting with her father. Jenny asks Salvador for help to find her father, but he makes it clear to her that the only way she can find him is to denounce him. Juana tries to console Josefina by confessing her admiration for having moved on after Ramón's abandonment. Gabriel questions Paula's motives for organizing a children's party, as it seems more like a social event. Paula takes advantage of the fact that she hired Juana as a photographer to show her the happy family she has at Gabriel's side.
25	"Alergia a la realidad"	5 July 2024	2.65
Camila shows up at Paula's party and Amparo calls her out on her audacity. Josefina takes advantage of the party to show Juana how different her life is from Gabriel's, warning her that she will only suffer if she goes after him. Seeing that Juana is unwilling to stay away from Gabriel, Paula warns her that from now on she will see her as an enemy. Nicolas' prank ends up humiliating Paula by turning her party into a disaster.
26	"Siempre estarás encadenado a mí"	8 July 2024	2.54
Gabriel demands that Paula revise the divorce agreement, since it is a fact that they will not be married for much longer. David warns Gabriel that Juana will always have his protection, even if it costs them their friendship. Salvador rescues Jenny from an accident and she begins to see him with different eyes. Gabriel confronts Paula about her infidelity and begs her to allow herself to be happy with Luciano. Paula is determined to attack Juana and put an end once and for all to the threat to her marriage.
27	"Tu hijo es de Gabriel"	9 July 2024	2.62
Paula visits the brewery ready to get Juana out of her life for good. Yadira tries to make Jenny jealous by throwing in her face that she is dating Salvador, but ends up being the victim of a jealous outburst. Camila warns Paula about Gabriel's date with Juana so that she can go ahead and tell her the truth. Paula interferes in Gabriel's date to reveal to Juana that he is the father of her child.
28	"¿Por qué el amor duele tanto?"	10 July 2024	2.76
Paula laughs at having ruined any chance Gabriel might have had with Juana. Gabriel tries to chase Paula, but a distraction causes her to lose control of her vehicle. Ramón plucks up the courage to enter Josefina's house and face the consequences in order to see his children again. Josefina gets fed up with the enthusiasm with which Jenny receives Ramón and makes him see that he is the reason why she fixates on men who lie to her. Ricardo realizes that Salvador is in his bar and manages to provoke the detective's jealousy by kissing Jenny.
29	"Adiós a la Juana inocente"	11 July 2024	2.94
Martín tries to convince Juana to talk to Gabriel, but she refuses, assuring him that her baby has no father. Ramón celebrates Jenny's birthday and surprises her with the news that she has a younger sister. David advises Juana that although he loves the way she is, she must learn to be more assertive in order to defend her son. David blames Gabriel for allowing things with Juana to get out of control to the point that Paula is hospitalized.
30	"¿Perdí a nuestro bebé?"	12 July 2024	2.43
Jenny confronts Felipe to invite Ramón to her party and Juana pleads for her mother's happiness. Paula wakes up, but her last memory is of having been expecting Gabriel's child. Memo visits Ramón and demands an explanation for having abandoned Josefina, causing her great pain. Felipe tries to kick out Ramón from his house, but Jenny shows him who she prefers by her side during the celebration. Camila learns the real reason Paula could never give Gabriel a child.
31	"¡Nuestra historia comenzó al revés!"	15 July 2024	2.78
Salvador decides to take Gabriel into custody to prevent the situation with Juana from getting out of control and offers him advice. Juana puts a stop to the speculation regarding her pregnancy and confesses to the family that Gabriel is the father of her child. Juana consults with the family about the possibility of going away, somewhere where Gabriel cannot find her. Ramón advises Juana to reconsider her decision to flee and offers his remorse as an example. Juana gives Gabriel a chance to explain his deception and he confesses his true feelings.
32	"Tu egoísmo fue más grande que mi amor"	16 July 2024	2.60
Juana warns Gabriel that she will do anything to prevent him from claiming paternity over her baby. Upon returning home, Paula asks Gabriel for another chance to inseminate her, assuring him that this time the result will be different. Unaware of Ramón's illness, Josefina tries to convince Felipe to forgive his father before it is too late. Margarita knows that Ramón's life is coming to an end, but she refuses to accept such a loss after the time they have enjoyed as father and daughter. Rogelio investigates what is being said about Camila at Gabriel's house and discovers that she is only using him to make Gabriel fall in love with her.
33	"Su palabra contra la nuestra"	17 July 2024	2.61
Gabriel decides to share with the board of directors the offer of the Spaniards to merge both companies and thus, save the brewery. Margarita comes clean with Josefina about Ramón's health and she decides to put aside her resentment to offer her unconditional support. Gabriel appeals to Camila's intelligence so that she does not let herself be influenced by Rogelio and decides on her own about the future of the brewery. David explains to Juana that the only way to prevent Gabriel from claiming paternity is if she registers her son with another father, volunteering himself.
34	"El matrimonio sólo es un papel"	18 July 2024	2.54
Camila tries to get away from Rogelio before facing his revenge, but she doesn't count on one of his most loyal employees to catch up with her. Rogelio is fed up with Gabriel being in the middle of all his problems and decides to get him out of the way once and for all. Paula manages to recover certain fragments of her memory, but unfortunately she does not remember who Juana is. Ramón explains to Josefina why he never returned home despite his regrets and she confesses that she has never stopped loving him. Juana doubts that marrying David is the best idea, but he insists that there will be no obligation between the two of them.
35	"¿Quién merece otra oportunidad?"	19 July 2024	2.45
Gabriel asks Juana to reach a legal agreement before the situation leads them to tarnish each other's reputations. With Claudio's help, Juana and Gabriel manage to reach a series of agreements so that she can carry her pregnancy to term. David manages to interfere in the attack against Gabriel and is seriously wounded, causing a great commotion in the brewery with the news. Juana weighs Gabriel and David's actions and realizes who is more worthy of her affection.
36	"Desconfía hasta de tu sombra"	22 July 2024	2.60
Paula remembers Rogelio's wickedness and for his sake, makes him promise not to do anything that could hurt Gabriel. Camila asks Gabriel for help and confesses that Rogelio is the person behind the two of them. Jenny is forced to face her father's abandonment once again. Carlos confronts Rogelio to make him recognize his hatred for the Rubio family and forces him to face the truth about his father's death.
37	"¡Necesito divorciarme ya!"	23 July 2024	2.38
Manuel confronts Rogelio about his methods of getting rid of what is in his way and warns him that he will no longer help him in his dirty business. Gabriel warns Rogelio that he is aware of his problems with Camila, so he will not hesitate to blame him if anything should happen to her. Rogelio makes a plan to get rid of Manuel's suspicions and get rid of Gabriel once and for all. Jenny seeks Salvador's support to find her father and Felipe can't get over the fact that Ramón has abandoned his family again. Camila "accidentally" confesses to Gabriel how Paula never managed to get pregnant despite so many attempts, putting an end to any affection he may feel for his wife.
38	"Nacieron para estar juntos"	24 July 2024	2.55
Elvira acknowledges that if Francisco is still missing it is because he is no longer alive and assures that Camila is behind everything. Camila hints to Rogelio her suspicions that Francisco is not really missing and that he is the real culprit behind his death. Paula advises Rogelio that the best way to hurt Gabriel without physically hurting him is to focus on killing Juana and the baby she is expecting. Carlos advises Juana to listen to Gabriel's version of how their love was born.
39	"Tendríamos un hijo en común"	25 July 2024	2.30
After proving to Juana that his love is true, Gabriel manages to approach her baby like a real father. Josefina finds out that Juana was with Gabriel and confronts her to make her see reason about her intentions. Dany is furious with jealousy when she hears that Juana rejected David again to give Gabriel another chance. Paula confirms that Gabriel has already filed for divorce and decides to take away what he wants most in this world, his baby.
40	"Una vida llena de comodidades"	26 July 2024	2.52
Paula ignores Rogelio's orders and insists on fighting for custody of Juana's child. Salvador may be close to finishing his investigation into Francisco's disappearance. Camila offers Juana the fortune she could may desire in exchange for her to disappear and stay away from Gabriel forever.
41	"La ley en mis propias manos"	29 July 2024	2.66
Gabriel warns Paula that he will stop at nothing to prevent her from claiming custody of Juana's child. Gabriel puts Juana on notice about Paula's threats to keep her child. Juana threatens Paula to keep her baby out of her legal battle against Gabriel or she will face the consequences. Paula confronts Camila for confessing to Gabriel that she was taking birth control pills during her inseminations.
42	"Me siento en un reality"	30 July 2024	2.35
Paula asks Camila to find someone capable of eliminating Juana once and for all, while she will pay for it. Juana is upset with Gabriel for putting one of his bodyguards to follow her, as she feels she lost her privacy. Salvador visits Jenny to talk about Ramón and Josefina allows them a moment to talk alone.
43	"Si me llega a pasar algo..."	31 July 2024	2.18
During the brewery event, Gabriel confronts Rogelio about his intentions to ruin the brewery, linking him directly to the attempt on his life. Rogelio warns Camila that despite Gabriel's protection, he has many ways to cause her pain. Suspecting that Rogelio might make another attempt on his life, Gabriel asks David to take care of Juana and her baby if anything happens to him.
44	"Intento de robo"	1 August 2024	2.39
Suspecting that Paula will try to blame her for the attack against Juana, Camila gathers all the evidence she can to clear her name. Nahual and his people carry out Paula's order to kill Juana.
45	"El milagro de la Virgen"	2 August 2024	2.31
Juana manages to save herself from the thugs, but ends up unconscious and Jenny discovers signs that she could lose the baby. Fearing future complications during pregnancy, Juana asks Gabriel to focus on saving the life of the child she is expecting. Felipe realizes that the love between Juana and Gabriel is true and confronts Josefina to leave them alone. Although his divorce is not yet finalized, Gabriel asks Juana to move in together so that they do not have to separate again.
46	"Un amor peligroso"	5 August 2024	2.46
Josefina finds Ramón and convinces him to return home. Tania confesses to Gabriel that she heard Manuel complain to Paula about her intention to get Juana out of the way. Juana talks to David openly and explains that the affection she has for him could never become love as a couple. Gabriel finds Paula and confronts her for trying to kill Juana and the child she is expecting.
47	"Vete del país"	6 August 2024	2.70
While Elvira loses hope of finding her son Francisco alive, prosecutor Quiroz confesses to her that Gabriel is at the top of the list of suspects. Salvador warns Gabriel that his investigation is being manipulated by someone powerful and suggests going to another country while he clarifies Francisco's disappearance. Juana recognizes among Salvador's files the leader of Los Nahuales, who happened to have Paula's bracelet among his belongings.
48	"Una guerra de dos familias"	7 August 2024	2.59
Camila makes sure Salvador receives all the evidence that Paula is behind Juana's attack. Prosecutor Quiroz arranges for the leader of Los Nahuales and his two accomplices to be executed in their jail cells, and attempts to prevent Salvador from arresting Paula. Gabriel explains to Juana how their love is in the middle of the war between the Rubio and Fuenmayor family. Gabriel leaves David, Enriqueta and Carlos in charge of the company to make sure everything runs smoothly during his absence. Despite Rogelio's threats, Camila goes to the prosecutor's office to testify against Paula.
49	"Tenemos el tiempo encima"	8 August 2024	2.26
To Salvador's surprise, Camila testifies on Paula's behalf, giving a version of events far removed from reality. Camila admits to Gabriel that she gave false testimony due to an arrangement she made with Rogelio to save her life and that of her family. Salvador gives Gabriel the opportunity to flee before the police find any evidence against him. The police find Francisco's lifeless body at Gabriel's estate, blaming him directly for the crime.
50	"Orden de captura"	9 August 2024	2.20
During the ultrasound, Gabriel and Juana are thrilled to see that their baby is developing with perfect clarity. Rogelio warns Manuel that he has more than one plan to bring Gabriel down and take over the Rubio brewery. Gabriel offers Juana the option of returning home to her family instead of having to run from the police. The warrant for Gabriel's arrest becomes national news, worrying the Bravo family for Juana's well-being.
51	"Lo frágil que es la vida"	12 August 2024	2.40
Manuel fears that Rogelio is the real culprit in Francisco's death, remembering that he was about to sell him his shares in the brewery before he disappeared. Salvador makes Quiroz believe he is on his side and only uses Jenny to find Gabriel. Juana recognizes that life could be gone in an instant and decides to give herself to Gabriel.
52	"Nada ni nadie me va a detener"	13 August 2024	2.20
Rogelio confesses to Paula what he really plans to do once he gets full control over the Rubio brewery; Amparo overhears him and begs Manuel to take care of Paula, as she fears that Rogelio will end up hurting her with his revenge. Camila decides to go to Francisco's funeral at Elvira's house despite her rivalry with her.
53	"Me quiero casar contigo"	14 August 2024	2.20
Camila tries to make Elvira come to her senses and stop blaming Gabriel for Francisco's death, but the Fuenmayor family intercedes to prevent it. Felipe opens his heart to Josefina and she is proud to see that he called Ramón his father, letting her know that he is healing his wounds. Gabriel takes advantage of the nature tour to ask Juana to be his wife. Juana notices a strange sensation and quickly realizes that it is her baby's first kicks.
54	"Peleando por el amor"	15 August 2024	2.40
Gabriel assures Juana that the only way to protect her from Paula's attacks will be to turn himself in to the authorities. Felipe thanks Ramón for procuring Josefina's happiness, calls him father to his face and they embrace for the first time. Salvador and Jenny admit the love they felt since the first time he saved her.
55	"¿Quién merece otra oportunidad?"	16 August 2024	2.20
Rogelio realizes that Salvador deceived prosecutor Quiroz when he assured him that he would use the Bravo family to find Gabriel's whereabouts. Salvador and Jenny manage to find the hotel where Gabriel and Juana are hiding; they make a plan to turn themselves in to the authorities.
56	"Siempre volveré a ti"	19 August 2024	2.30
Josefina recognizes that Gabriel's love for Juana is genuine and begins to see him as a member of the Bravo family, defending his innocence. Gabriel's lawyer discovers the mistake he made when he got carried away and went to his appointment without making sure no one was following him. Amparo discovers that Paula is as evil as Rogelio and is enraged by the disappointment. Gabriel demonstrates his willingness to cooperate with the law by peacefully turning himself in to the authorities.
57	"El nuevo presidente de la empresa"	20 August 2024	2.50
Salvador assures that Rogelio's men will look for any opportunity to kill Gabriel, so he decides to stay awake watching over him at the prosecutor's office. Paula tries to make fun of Gabriel's situation, but he makes it clear that he will no longer put up with her threats. Rogelio succeeds in carrying out his plan and gathers the company's board to appoint himself president of the brewery.
58	"Labor de parto"	21 August 2024	2.50
Rogelio removes Gabriel's friends from their positions in the company, and offers them a fair settlement. Due to Quiroz's intervention, Gabriel is transferred to the prison and classified as a violent criminal. Despite being only 6 months pregnant, Juana goes into labor.
59	"El heredero de todo"	22 August 2024	2.40
Someone in jail has been guarding Gabriel's life, but only Camila knows the real reason for protecting him. Manuel warns David that if Rogelio becomes the majority shareholder, he will bankrupt the company. Camila tells Paula that Juana has given birth to a boy.
60	"Tu vida es una porquería"	23 August 2024	2.50
Elvira seeks Salvador's opinion regarding Gabriel's apprehension and he lets her know his true suspicions. Paula and Rogelio offer a juicy reward to Juana to go as far away as possible with her baby to prevent Gabriel from recognizing him as his son. Claudio and Salvador get permission for Gabriel to be present during the baptism of his son, Eduardo.
61	"Necesito que Gabriel pierda todo"	26 August 2024	2.40
Elvira prevents Rogelio from selling the Rubio brewery to a competitor and throws in his face her suspicions that he is the real culprit for Francisco's death. Rogelio discovers that Camila's brother Bruno is the one who has been protecting Gabriel from all the attacks in prison. Paula cannot stand the idea of Gabriel being happy with Juana and takes revenge by kidnapping Eduardo.
62	"Esta noche quieren acabar contigo"	27 August 2024	2.50
Juana's neighbors find Paula and join forces to make her hand over Eduardo. Ramón confesses to Felipe that he has returned to make amends for past mistakes and to make sure that everyone finds happiness with their loved one. Salvador and Jenny manage to get married in the company of their friends and family. Seeing the little evidence against Rogelio, Camila is willing to confess her crime as long as Gabriel is set free.
63	"La muerte de Ramón"	28 August 2024	2.60
Despite everything that is happening, Paula assures that Rogelio is innocent and she is the only person capable of defending him. Ramón takes advantage of the last moments of his life to make sure that his entire family knows the love he feels for each of them. Paula confirms that Rogelio is indeed exercising revenge against the Rubio family, exposing him in front of the judge. Juana finds the memory card she had lost and when she opens it, she discovers that she has in her hands the key to prove Gabriel's innocence.
64	"Por Gabriel, lo que sea"	29 August 2024	2.70
Felipe bids Ramón a final farewell, grateful for having returned to their lives. Juana is afraid that her nerves will betray her and she will end up testifying to something that could affect Gabriel's freedom. Amparo tries to make Paula understand the danger she is in by being so close to Rogelio. Among Juana's photos, Salvador manages to recover an image that proves that Rogelio is Francisco's murderer.
65	"Siempre fueron mi destino"	30 August 2024	3.03
Faced with the evidence, the judge declares Gabriel's innocence and blames Rogelio and Quiroz for Francisco's death. Paula arrives at the place where Rogelio has kidnapped Manuel and Camila and confronts him. Rogelio threatens Paula and tells the police that he will use his children as a shield. Camila manages to untie herself and beats Rogelio so that the Fuenmayor siblings can escape. Rogelio tries to confront the police and shoots Camila to death before being arrested. Paula decides that the best thing to do is to leave the country, but the police arrive to arrest her for attempted murder against Juana. Bruno receives Rogelio in jail and makes sure to make him pay for the death of his sister, Camila. Three years pass and Paula is released from the Women's Social Reintegration Center, determined to start a new life. Jenny tells Salvador that she is pregnant. After graduating from college, Juana celebrates that no one suffers from the curse that prevented the Bravo family from finding love, and she and Gabriel marry.
