= Polen (TV series) =

- Genre: Thriller
- Created by: Luis Carlos Ávila
- Showrunner: Juancho Cardona
- Written by: Juancho Cardona; Connie Acosta; Raúl Prieto; Rosa Clemente; Daniel Yépes; Rodrigo Jiménez; Luis Carlos Ávila
- Directed by: Juancho Cardona
- Starring: Ana Brenda Contreras; Tiago Correa; Claudia Ramírez
- Composers: Alain Gómez Reclá; Luis Daniel González
- Country of origin: Mexico
- Original language: Spanish
- No. of seasons: 1
- No. of episodes: 10

Production
- Executive producers: Paul Drago; Juancho Cardona; Manolo Cardona; Raúl Prieto
- Producers: Mariana Zubillaga; Julye Cuartas Varela
- Cinematography: Kike Carrión
- Camera setup: Multi-camera
- Production company: 11:11 Films

Original release
- Network: Vix
- Release: 6 March 2026

Polen is a Mexican thriller television series created by Luis Carlos Ávila. It stars Ana Brenda Contreras, Tiago Correa and Claudia Ramírez. The series premiered on Vix on 6 March 2026.

== Cast ==
=== Main ===
- Ana Brenda Contreras as Sandra Fitzgerald
- Tiago Correa as Jacobo
- Claudia Ramírez as Beatriz Zamudio
- Arap Bethke as Juan Mendoza
- Estefanía Villarreal as Isabella
- Antonio Gaona as Andrés
- Mar Sordo as Wendy
- Francisco de la O
- Gustavo Sánchez Parra as Paco
- Fabiola Guajardo as Alejandra
- Rocío Verdejo as Estela
- Claudette Maillé

=== Recurring and guest stars ===
- Ernesto Álvarez as Federico Espinoza
- Juan Aguirre as Camilo Benítez
- Rodolfo Arias as Miguel Salinas
- Christian Magaloni as Pablo
- Mariana Rountree as Luciana
- Ricardo Muñoz as Humberto
- Julio Casado as Héctor Acosta
- Marcos Duarte as Dr. Fuentes
- Alejandro Gazque as Raúl Díaz

== Production ==
The series was filmed from March to June 2023.

== Episodes ==
No.	Title	Original release date
1	"Reina muerta"	6 March 2026
2	"Memorias"	6 March 2026
3	"El secreto de Juan"	6 March 2026
4	"El casco del diablo"	6 March 2026
5	"Caín y Abel"	6 March 2026
6	"Muerte en espiral"	6 March 2026
7	"La amante"	6 March 2026
8	"Crónica de los Zamudio"	6 March 2026
9	"Yo solo quería que se durmiera..."	6 March 2026
10	"Seis horas"	6 March 2026
