= Flor de Fango =

Sculpture in Mexico City, Mexico

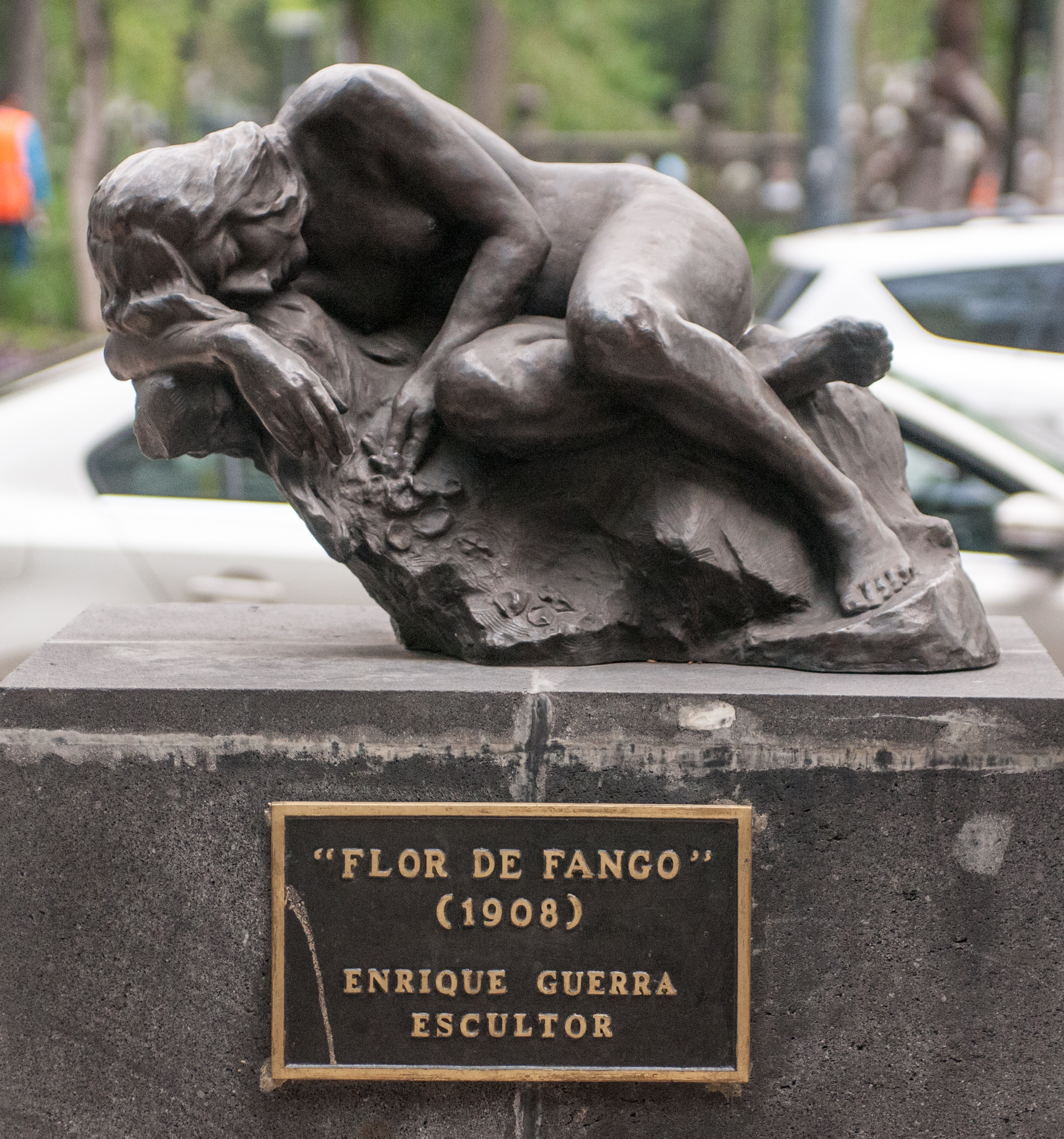
- The sculpture in 2015
- Artist: Enrique Guerra
- Year: 1908
- Location: Mexico City, Mexico
- 19°26′5.5″N 99°8′42.8″W

Flor de Fango is an outdoor 1908 sculpture by Enrique Guerra, installed in Mexico City, Mexico.

== See also ==
- 1908 in art
