= Román Díaz =

Argentine footballer

Personal information
- Full name: Román Gonzalo Díaz
- Date of birth: 31 July 1980 (age 46)
- Place of birth: Moreno, Argentina
- Height: 1.73 m (5 ft 8 in)
- Position: Attacking midfielder

Senior career*
| Years | Team | Apps | (Gls) |
| 2001–2003 | Chacarita Juniors | 36 | (3) |
| 2003–2004 | San Lorenzo | 25 | (5) |
| 2004 | Atlas | 4 | (0) |
| 2005–2006 | Lanús | 18 | (4) |
| → 2005 | Rosario Central (loan) | 4 | (0) |
| 2007 | Deportes Quindío | 1 | (0) |
| 2007–2008 | Almirante Brown | 14 | (1) |
| 2009 | Almagro | 11 | (2) |
| 2009 | Instituto | 9 | (3) |
| 2010 | Almirante Brown | 24 | (5) |
| 2011 | Everton | 7 | (3) |
| 2012 | Almirante Brown | 7 | (1) |
| 2012 | Douglas Haig | 3 | (0) |
| 2013 | Tristán Suárez | 12 | (2) |
| 2013–2014 | Platense | 12 | (0) |
| 2014–2015 | Almirante Brown | 33 | (10) |
| 2017 | Mercedes | – | (–) |
| Total | | 218 | (39) |
- * Club domestic league appearances and goals

Román Gonzalo Díaz (born July 31, 1980, in Moreno, Argentina) is an Argentine former footballer who played as an attacking midfielder.

== Teams ==
- (Argentina) Chacarita Juniors 2001–2003
- (Argentina) San Lorenzo 2003–2004
- (Mexico) Atlas 2004
- (Argentina) Lanús 2005
- (Argentina) Rosario Central 2005
- (Argentina) Lanús 2006
- (Colombia) Deportes Quindío 2007
- (Argentina) Almirante Brown 2007–2008
- (Argentina) Almagro 2009
- (Argentina) Instituto 2009
- (Argentina) Almirante Brown 2010
- (Chile) Everton de Viña del Mar 2011
- (Argentina) Almirante Brown 2012
- (Argentina) Douglas Haig 2012
- (Argentina) Tristán Suárez 2013
- (Argentina) Platense 2013–2014
- (Argentina) Almirante Brown 2014–2015
- (Argentina) Mercedes 2017

== Titles ==
- (Argentina) Almirante Brown (Primera B Metropolitana 2009/2010)
