= Erick Elías =

Mexican actor (born 1980)

Erick Elias
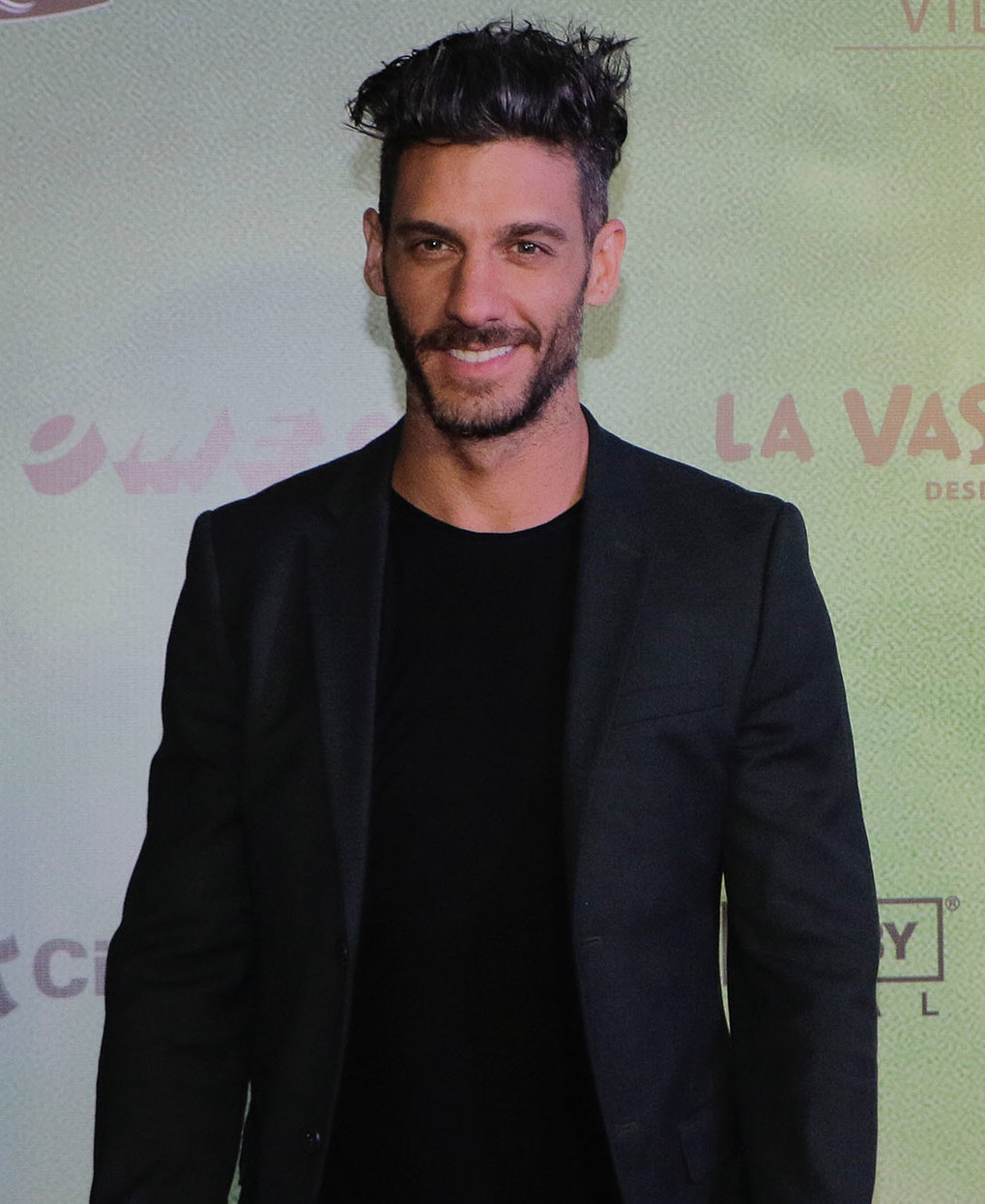
- Elías in 2018
- Born: Erick Elías Rabinovitz; June 23, 1980 (age 46); Guadalajara, Jalisco, Mexico
- Occupations: Actor, singer, model
- Years active: 2000-present
- Spouse: Karla Guindi (m. 2010)
- Children: 2

Erick Elías Rabinovitz (born June 23, 1980) is a Mexican actor. Elías began acting with a screen debut in DKDA: Sueños de juventud (2000), followed by roles in Amigos x siempre (2000). He became known in the reality show Protagonistas de Novela (2003), where he was the winner. He participated in projects of the American network Telemundo, such as; Gitanas (2004), El cuerpo del deseo (2005), El Zorro, la espada y la rosa (2007), Betty en NY (2019) and 100 días para enamorarnos (2020). He got his first starring role in the telenovela Tormenta en el paraíso. From there followed roles as protagonists in Niña de mi corazón (2010), Ni contigo ni sin ti (2011), Porque el amor manda (2013), El color de la pasión (2014) and El hotel de los secretos (2016), the first series that Televisa produced for Blim.

== Early life ==
Elías was born in Guadalajara, Jalisco, Mexico, in 1979 son of Cecilia Rabinovitz and Ricardo Elías Pessah. He has a brother named Alexis Elías. He studied arts and industrial design. In 2010 he married Karla Guindi, with whom he has two children, Penélope Elías Guindi (b. 2011) and Olivia Elías Guindi (b. 2013).

== Acting career ==
=== Early career ===
Before dedicating himself to the performance arts, he was part of a musical group called Tierra Cero. He made his acting debut in the 2000 telenovela DKDA: Sueños de juventud and Amigos x siempre. He became known in the 2003 reality show Protagonistas de Novela, where he turned out to be a winner. In 2004 he auditioned to be the main villain of the telenovela produced by Argos Comunicación for Telemundo Gitanas, where he played Jonás. After this project, he continued working for Telemundo with two more telenovelas, titled El cuerpo del deseo and El Zorro, la espada y la rosa. In 2007 he got her first starring role with Sara Maldonado in the telenovela Tormenta en el paraíso. In 2008, he was chosen by Carlos Moreno to participate also starring in the telenovela En nombre del amor remake of the 1991 telenovela Cadenas de amargura.

Elías has voiced Flint Lockwood in the Spanish-language version of Cloudy with a Chance of Meatballs and its sequel from Sony Pictures Animation. According to an interview, he has stated that his daughter, Penelope, inspired him to be the dubbing voice of Flint.

He provided the voice of Charro Negro, the main antagonist of the Mexican animated film, La Leyenda del Charro Negro released on 19 January 2018.

== Filmography ==
=== Films roles ===
| Year | Title | Roles | Notes |
|---|---|---|---|
| 2009 | Cloudy with a Chance of Meatballs | Flint Lockwood | Voice role; Spanish dubbing |
| 2013 | No sé si cortarme las venas o dejármelas largas | Aarón's friend | |
| 2013 | Actores S.A. | El enmascarado | |
| 2013 | Cloudy with a Chance of Meatballs 2 | Flint Lockwood | Voice role; Spanish dubbing |
| 2014 | Amor de mis amores | Javier | Also as associate producer |
| 2016 | Compadres | Santos | |
| 2016 | ¿Qué culpa tiene el niño? | Juan Pablo | |
| 2017 | El ángel en el reloj | Alejandro | Voice role |
| 2017 | Cuando los hijos regresan | Chico | |
| 2018 | La leyenda del Charro Negro | Charro Negro | Voice role |
| 2018 | A ti te quería encontrar | Diego | |
| 2018 | Inquilinos | Demián | |
| 2021 | Peligro en tu mirada | Emilio Lombardi | |
| 2022 | 40 Years Young | César | |
| 2023 | How to Kill Mom | Pablo | |
| 2024 | Wake Up Mom | | |
| 2026 | La venganza del Charro Negro | Charro Negro / José | Voice role |

=== Television roles ===
| Year | Title | Roles | Notes |
|---|---|---|---|
| 2000 | Amigos x siempre | | |
| 2000 | DKDA: Sueños de juventud | | |
| 2003 | Protagonistas de Novela | Himself | |
| 2004 | Gitanas | Jonás | |
| 2005 | El Cuerpo del Deseo | Antonio Domínguez | |
| 2007 | El Zorro, la espada y la rosa | Renzo | |
| 2007–2008 | Tormenta en el paraíso | Nicolás Bravo | Main role; 185 episodes |
| 2008–2009 | En nombre del amor | Gabriel Lizarde | Series regular; 138 episodes |
| 2010 | Locas de amor | Damián | Series regular; 25 episodes |
| 2010 | Niña de mi corazón | Darío Arrioja | Main role; 87 episodes |
| 2011 | Ni contigo ni sin ti | Iker Rivas Olmedo | Main role; 124 episodes |
| 2012–2013 | Porque el amor manda | Rogelio Rivadeneira | Main antagonist; 182 episodes |
| 2014 | El color de la pasión | Marcelo Escalante | Main role; 117 episodes |
| 2016 | El hotel de los secretos | Julio Olmedo | Main role; 81 episodes |
| 2017 | Drunk History | Ávila Camacho | Episode: "La locura de Carlota, Hermanos Serdán, WWII" |
| 2019 | La Guzmán | Santiago Torrieri | Main role; 59 episodes |
| 2019 | Betty en NY | Armando Mendoza | Main role; 123 episodes |
| 2020–2021 | 100 días para enamorarnos | Plutarco Cuesta | Main role; 92 episodes |
| 2024 | Accidente | Fabián | |
| 2026 | Los encantos del sinvergüenza | Bernardo | Main role |

== Awards and nominations ==
| Year | Award | Category | Telenovela | Result |
|---|---|---|---|---|
| 2014 | Premios TVyNovelas | Best Male Antagonist | Porque el amor manda | Nominated |
| 2015 | Premios TVyNovelas | Best Lead Actor | El Color de la Pasión | Nominated |
| 2017 | Premios TVyNovelas | Best Lead Actor | El hotel de los secretos | Nominated |
