= TVyNovelas Award for Best Telenovela Multiplatform =

Award for telenovelas

- Awarded for: Best production platform of each telenovela
- First award: 2014; Amores verdaderos
- Currently held by: 2016; Antes muerta que Lichita

== Winners and nominees ==
=== 2010s ===
| Winner | Nominated |
32nd TVyNovelas Awards
| Amores verdaderos by Nicandro Díaz González | |
33rd TVyNovelas Awards
| Mi corazón es tuyo by Juan Osorio | |
34th TVyNovelas Awards
| Antes muerta que Lichita by Rosy Ocampo | A que no me dejas by Carlos Moreno; Amor de barrio by Roberto Hernández Vázquez; Amores con trampa by Emilio Larrosa |
