= List of Rebelde characters =

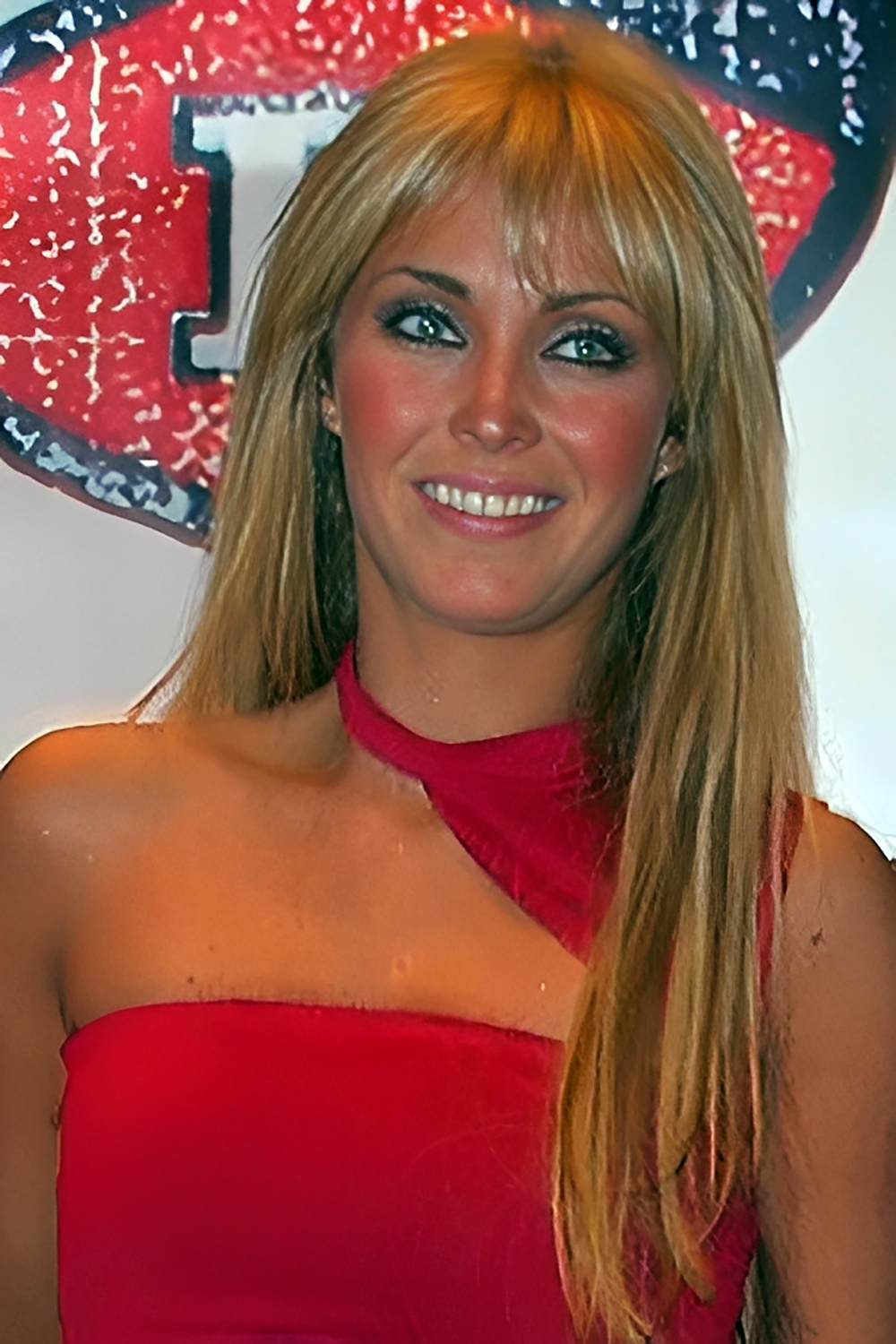
Anahí

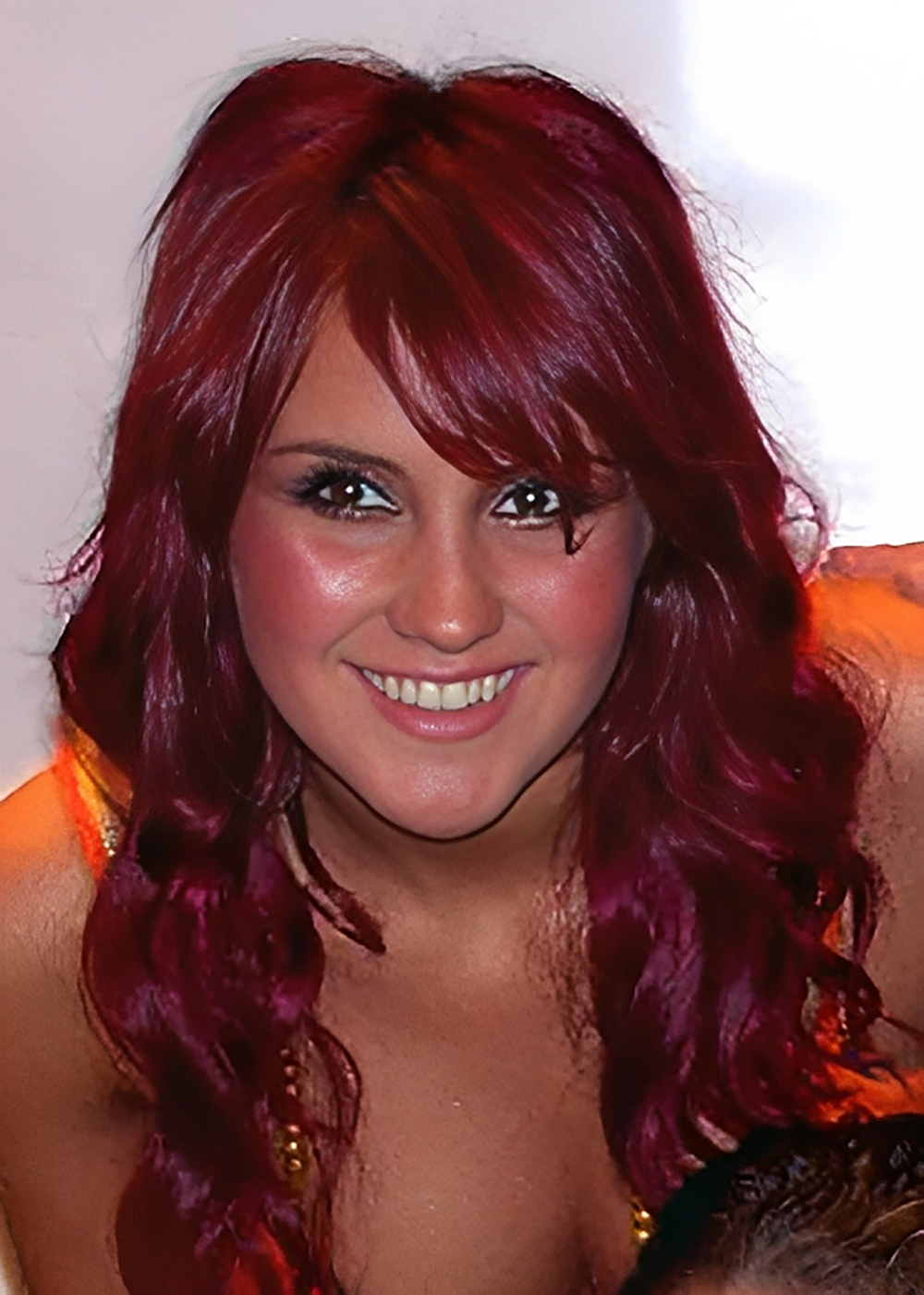
Dulce María

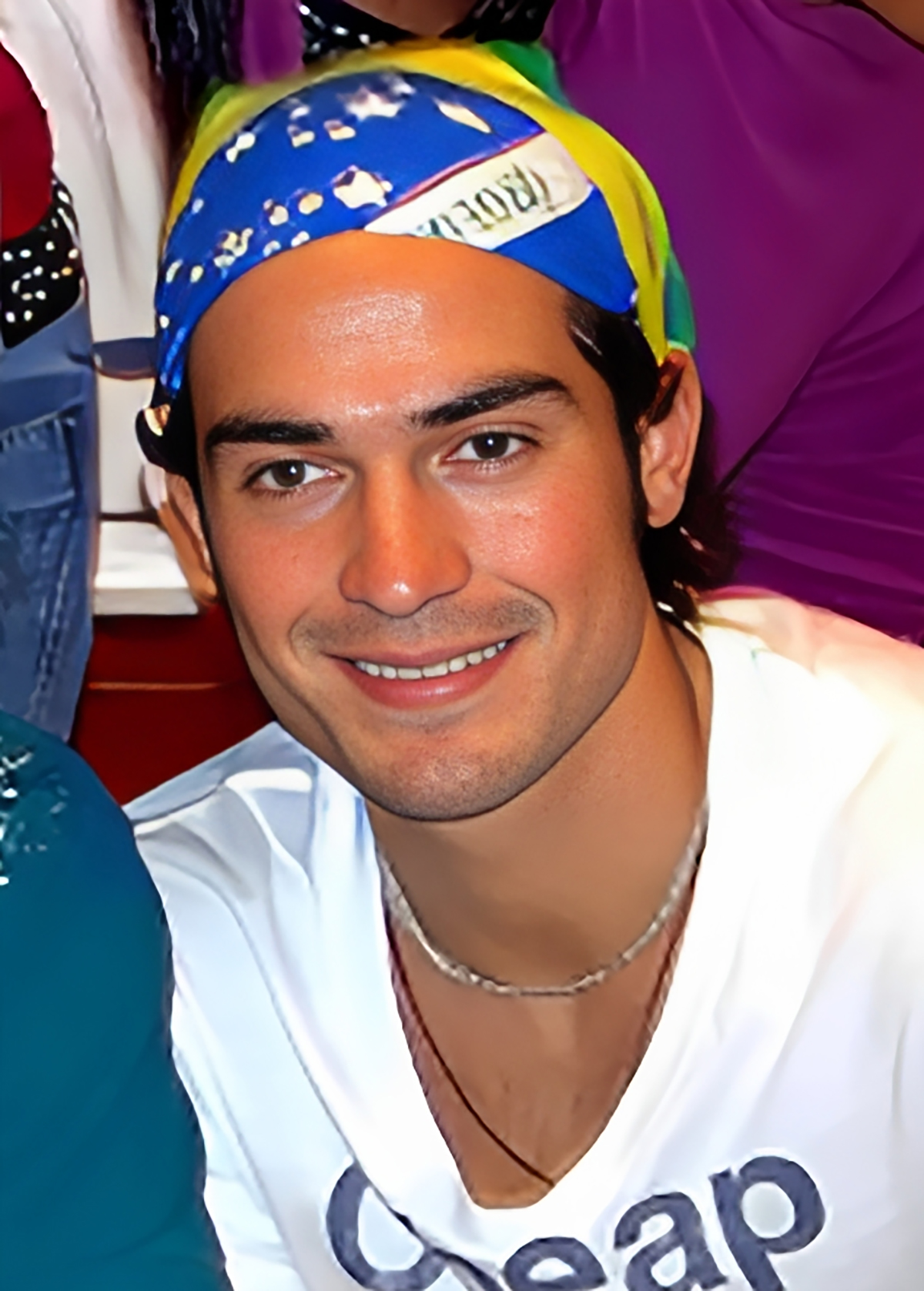
Alfonso Herrera

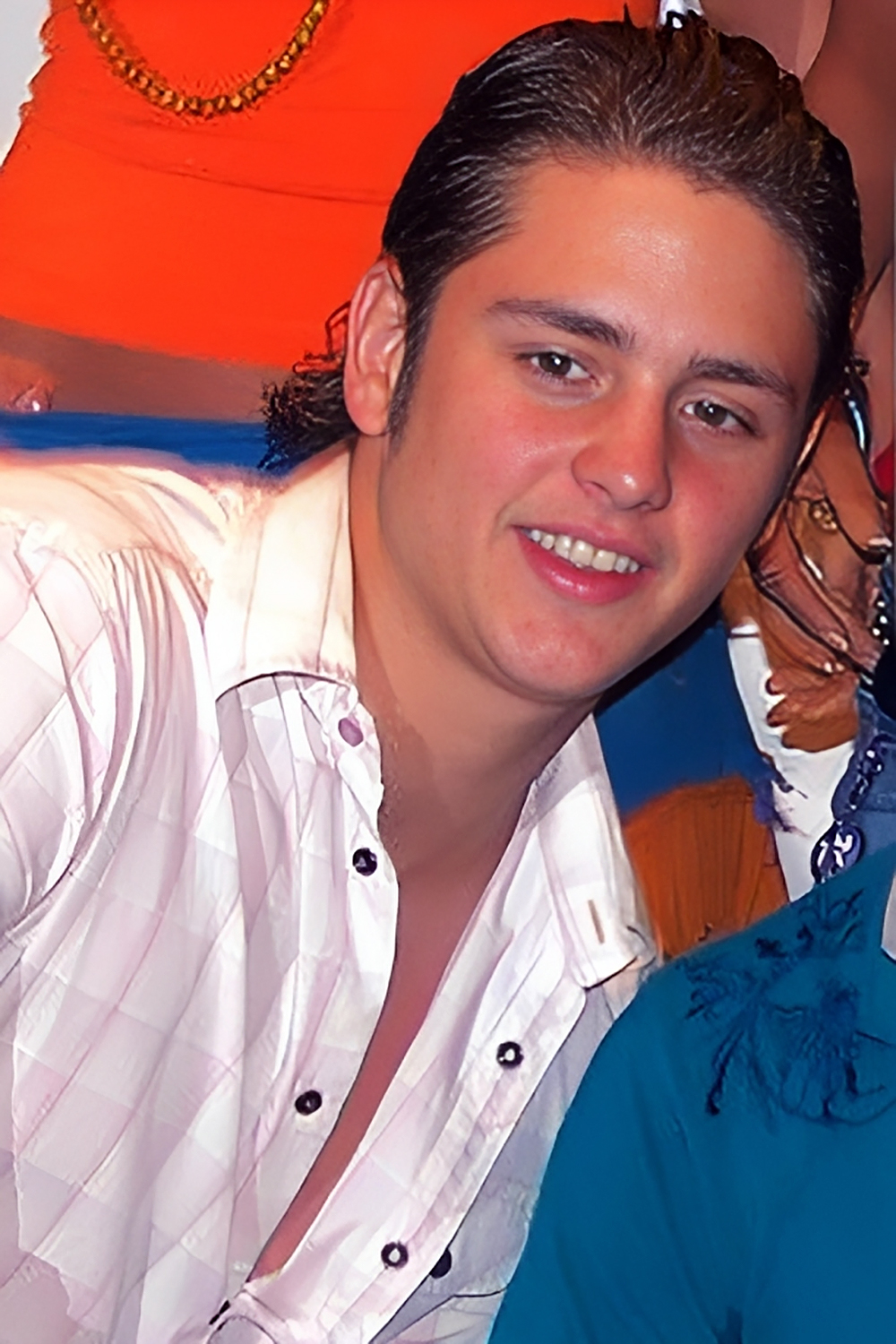
Christopher Uckermann

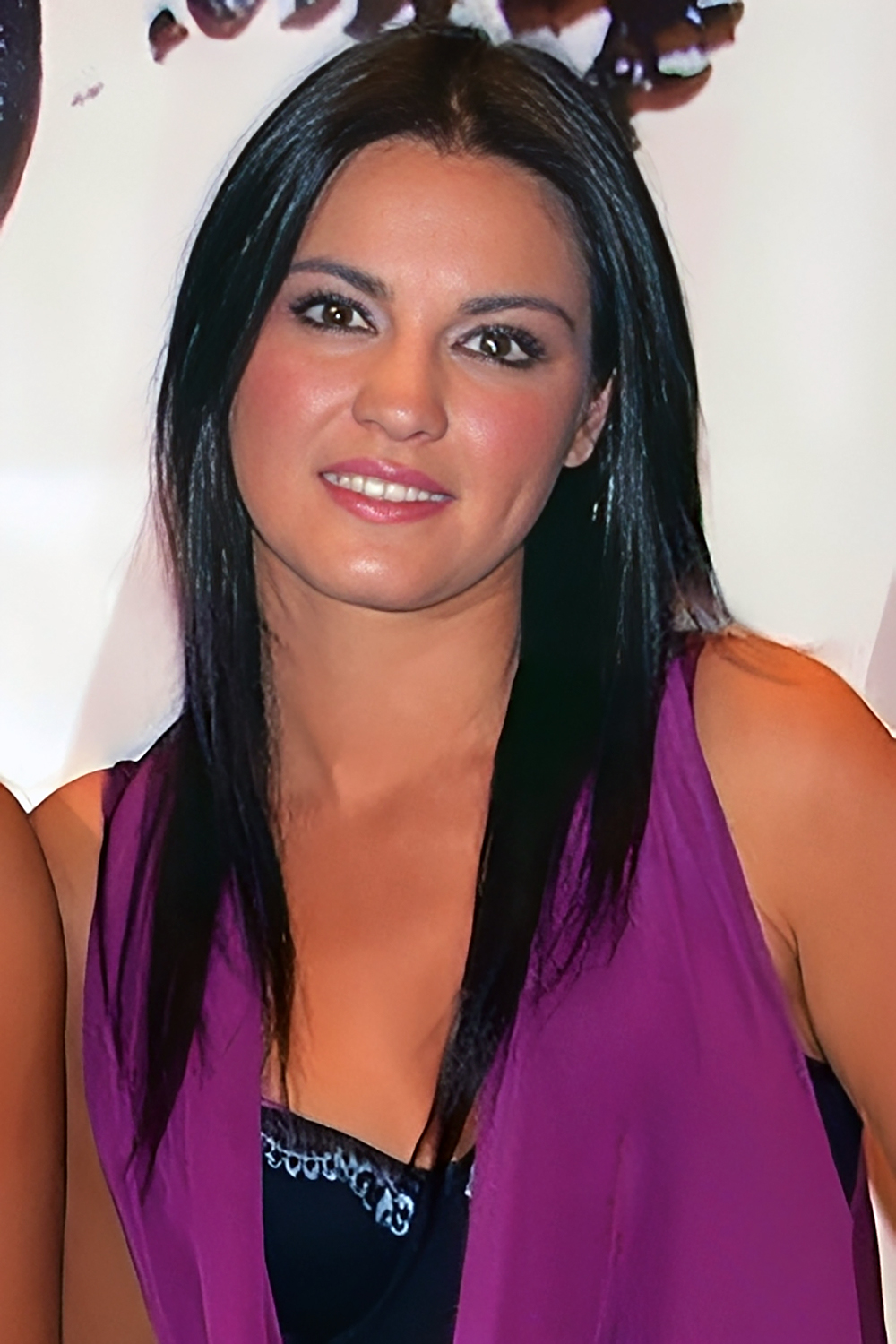
Maite Perroni

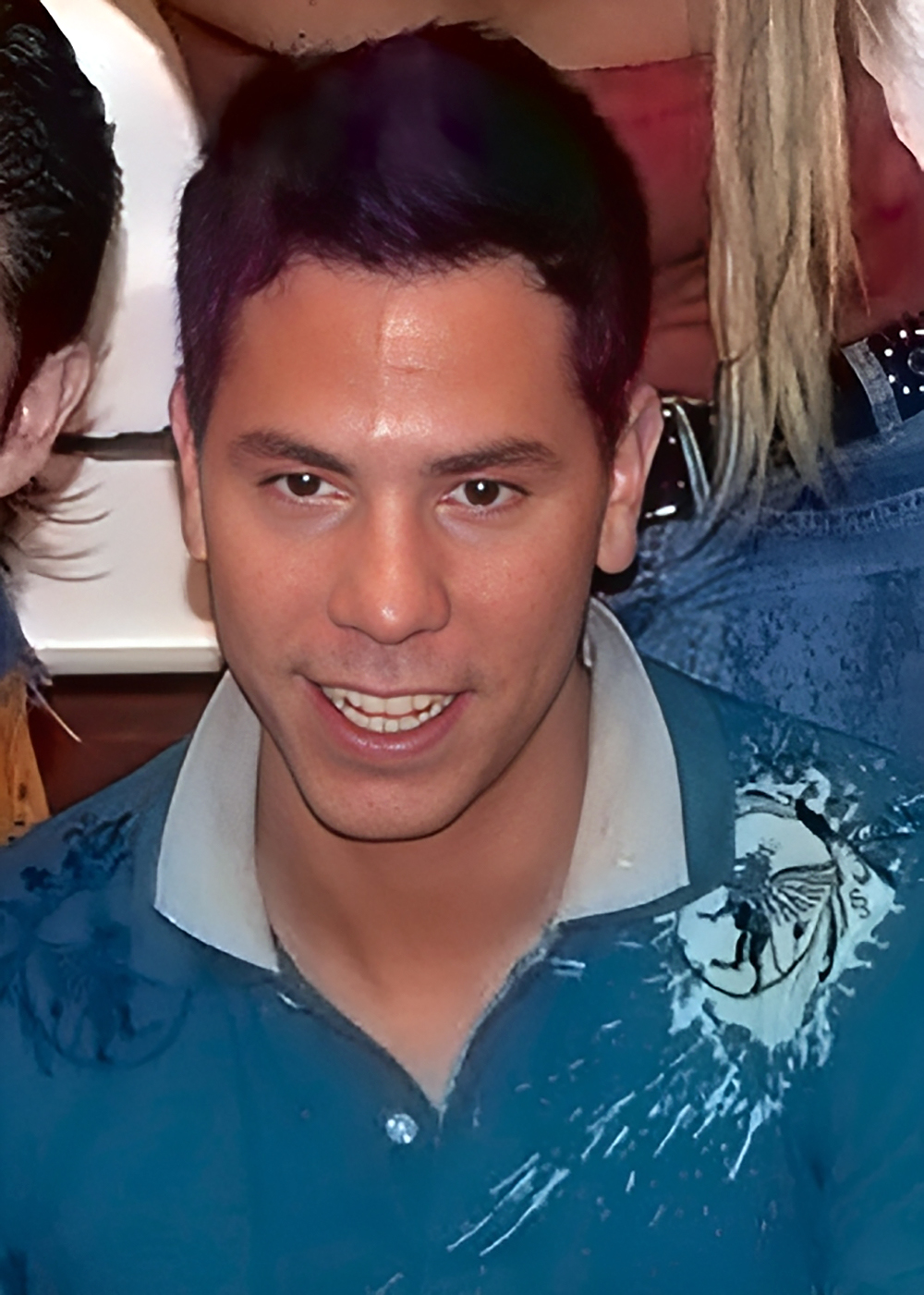
Christian Chávez

Anahí, Dulce, Herrera, Uckermann, Perroni, and Chávez played the telenovela's main teenagers.

This article contains a list of characters from the telenovela Rebelde. The series is a remake of the 2002 Argentine telenovela Rebelde Way.

Rebelde features several different plotlines, many of which are put on hold for several episodes before they are resumed. Many of the minor characters often play central roles for a few episode before returning to the background.

== Overview ==
- The cast should be organized according to the series original broadcast credits, with new cast members being added to the end of the list. Please keep in mind that 'main' cast status is determined by the series producers, not by popularity or screen time.

Character	Portrayed by	Seasons				
Character	Portrayed by	Rebelde (2004–2006)			Rebelde (2022)	
Character	Portrayed by	1	2	3	1	2
León Bustamante	Enrique Rocha †	Main	Main	Main		
Franco Colucci	Juan Ferrara	Main	Main	Main		
Alma Rey	Ninel Conde (Note: Conde is billed as a "special guest star" in all seasons, but she is still considered a series regular.)	Main	Main	Main		
Enrique Madarriaga	Patricio Borghetti	Main		Main		
Mayra Fernández	Leticia Perdigón	Main	Main	Main		
Mía Colucci Cáceres	Anahí	Main	Main	Main		
Roberta Alejandra Pardo Rey	Dulce María	Main	Main	Main		
Miguel Arango Cervera	Alfonso Herrera	Main	Main	Main		
Diego Bustamante	Christopher Uckermann	Main	Main	Main		
Celina Ferrer	Estefanía Villarreal	Main	Main	Main	Main	Main
Pilar Gandía	Karla Cossío	Main	Main	Main	Recurring	Guest
Jóse Luján Landeros	Zoraida Gómez	Main	Main	Main		
Tomás Goycolea	Jack Duarte	Main	Main	Main		
Guadalupe "Lupita" Fernández	Maite Perroni	Main	Main	Main		
Teódoro "Téo" Ruiz Palacios	Eddy Vilard	Main	Main	Main		
Victoria "Vico" Paz	Angelique Boyer	Main	Main	Main		
Nicolás "Nico" Huber	Rodrigo Nehme	Main	Main	Main		
Giovanni Méndez López	Christian Chávez	Main	Main	Main		
Joaquín Mascaró	Michel Gurfi	Main				
Renata Lizaldi	Grettell Valdez (Note: Valdez is billed as a "special appearance" in season 1, but she is still considered a series regular for season 1.)	Main				
Carlo Colucci	Miguel Rodarte	Main				
Gastón Diestro	Tony Dalton	Main	Main	Main		
Hilario Ortiz Tirado	Héctor Gómez †	Main				
Marina Casares de Colucci	Nailea Norvind (Note: Norvind is billed as a "special appearance" in seasons 2-3, but she is still considered a series regular.)		Main	Main		
Guillermo Arregui	Rafael Inclán		Main			
Leonardo Francisco Blanco	Eleazar Gómez		Main			
Rocco Bezauri	Diego Gonzalez		Main	Main		
Mauricio Garza Alebrija	Ernesto Díaz		Main			
Sol de la Riva	Fuzz		Main	Main		
Bianca Delight	Allisson Lozano		Main	Main		
Dolores "Lola" Arregui	Viviana Macouzet		Main	Main		
Santos Echagüe Robles	Derrick James		Main	Main		
Iñaki Urcola de los Santos	Antonio Sáenz		Main	Main		
Jack Lizaldi Heidi	Ronald Duarte	Recurring	Recurring	Main		
Inés Alanís	Patsy (Note: Patsy is billed as a "special appearance" in season 3, but she is still considered a series regular for season 3.)			Main		
Jana Gandía Cohen	Azul Guaita				Main	Main
Luka Colucci	Franco Masini				Main	Main
Estebán Torres/Estebán Colucci	Sergio Mayer Mori				Main	Main
María José Sevilla (M.J)	Andrea Chaparro				Main	Main
Guillermo Álvarez (Dixon)	Jerónimo Cantillo				Main	Main
Andrea "Andi" Agosti	Selene				Main	Main
Sebastián "Sebas" Langarica	Alejandro Puente				Main	Main
Emília Alo	Giovanna Grigio				Main	Main
Marcelo Colucci	Leonardo de Lozanne				Main	Main
Lourdes	Karla Sofia Gazcón				Main	Main
Anita	Pamela Almanza				Main	
Gustavo "Gus" Bauman	Flavio Medina					Main
Okane	Saak					Main

== Teens ==
=== Mía Colucci Cáceres ===
Mía Colucci
- Rebelde character
- Portrayed by: Anahí
- First appearance: October 4, 2004
- Last appearance: June 2, 2006
- Created by: Cris Morena
In-universe information
- Other names: Barbie & princess
- Occupation: Student(former) singer(present) fashion Designer(present)
- Parents: Franco Colucci (father); Marina Cáceres (mother) Alma rey (step-mother) Carlo Colucci (uncle) Marcelo Colucci(uncle) Luka Colucci (cousin)
- Siblings: Roberta Alejandra Maria Reverte Rey (step-sister) Jose Luján (step-sister)
- Spouse: Miguel Arango (husband)
- Children: 4?

- Played by: Anahí

Mía Colucci Caceres is Franco Colucci's only daughter with his first wife, Marina Caceres. The most popular girl and a queen bee at Elite Way School, she comes from a wealthy and privileged family who lives in Mexico City. Spoiled and self-centered, she, however, can be very loyal, attentive and tender towards those she loves. Her best friends are Celina and Victoria "Vico", but she is also very close friends with Lupita and Roberta. Mía starts RBD with her boyfriend Miguel and their friends Roberta, Diego, Giovanni, and Lupita, and acts as a songwriter for the band. She also loves fashion and acts as a stylist for her friends.

Mía falls in love with Miguel at first sight but keeps quiet since he starts dating her friend Celina. However, Mía is unaware that Miguel came to Elite Way in an attempt to grow close to her in order to exact revenge on her father, Franco, who Miguel holds responsible for his father's death. Despite her strong feelings for Miguel, Mía and Miguel argue constantly when they first meet. During this time, Mía briefly dates Joaquin and later starts a relationship with Gastón, who works at the school as a prefect and, knowing Mía and Miguel are interested in each other, tries hard to turn them against each other. Miguel is aware of Mía's relationship with Gastón and helps them protect their secret by telling Franco that he is dating Mía when Franco finds out about his daughter dating an older man who works at her school, even kissing her in front of her father, Gastón and the school's principal. They start dating and declare their love for each other, with Miguel growing increasingly divided between going through with his plans and letting go of his past and moving on with Mía. However, Mía uncovers the truth about Miguel's real reasons to approach her and, devastated, breaks up with Miguel. It is later revealed that Miguel's father's death was caused by Mía's Uncle Carlo. Miguel apologizes to Mía and her father and puts his past behind him. In the first season's finale, Mía surprises Miguel by joining him on his flight to Monterrey, where his family is originally from. In the second season, their relationship is more unified than ever, with only a few bumpy roads and short breakups. The couple takes a romantic trip to Cancun and grows closer when stranded on an island.

In the third season, problems hit the couple's path in the shape of Sabrina. Sabrina is the spoiled daughter of RBD's producer, whose crush on Miguel knows no boundaries. Sabrina's persistence in flirting with Miguel makes Mía jealous and puts a strain in their relationship; they eventually break up when Sabrina tells everyone she and Miguel slept together. In truth, Miguel got drunk and fell asleep; Sabrina snuck into his bed barely clothed and when he woke up told him they had sex.

After their breakup, Mía grows deeply depressed. However, she finds comfort in her newfound friendship with Roberta, who is going through a similar rough patch with Diego and her mother. The two girls, who were at odds when they first met, grow close and start caring sincerely about each other. While struggling to come to terms with the end of her relationship with Miguel, Mía finds out that, instead of dying in a car crash like Franco told Mía, her mother is actually alive. Marina left her husband and toddler Mía because she was an addict, now she has recovered from her issues, she is back and wants a relationship with her daughter. At first, Mía is hurt and resentful that her father has lied to her about her mother for most of her life but eventually understands that Franco did that out of love for her trying to protect her from hurt and pain. Mía and Marina slowly form a relationship, bonding over the fact that Marina was also a singer when she was young, having passed her talent and love for the stage to her daughter.

Near the end of the series, the truth between Miguel and Sabrina is revealed. However, since Miguel's in a coma, Mía blames herself for her harsh treatment of her boyfriend and pleads with him to wake up and come back to her. He eventually does during one of her daily visits to him, but as a consequence of his coma, he has memory problems and can only remember he has a girlfriend. When Mía asks him who is his girlfriend's name, he mistakenly says Sabrina, leaving Mía once again heartbroken and depressed. He finally remembers everything about Mía and their relationship during an RBD concert, while Mía's singing 'Sálvame', a song she wrote for him, Miguel decided to leave Mexico City and go back to his family in Monterrey. They finally talk when he is packing for his trip, with Miguel telling Mía that her song brought his memory back. Mía tearfully pleads with Miguel not to leave, saying she cannot live without him; Miguel starts crying and they kiss, making up for good.

Mía's family grows at the end of the series: Franco marries Roberta's mother, Alma, and together they adopt Roberta's best friend, Jose Luján. Miguel proposes to Mía before the graduation ceremony at Elite Way, and she say yes.

In the alternative ending of Mia and Miguel, they are on a very beautiful bridge.(Mia caresses her belly, implying that she already had her first time with Miguel and that she is pregnant with Miguel and they are expecting their first baby). Miguel kisses Mia's hand sweetly and tells her that she is the most beautiful image in this world and that when he sees her every day he likes her more and Mia tells him that she always dreamed of a love story where everything was tender and full of details (when Miguel kisses her mia gives a wink) Miguel asks her what this relationship expects from them, she answers that now their relationship will be more fragile and stronger that she is no longer afraid of loving him without limits.

=== Roberta Alejandra Maria Reverte Rey ===
Roberta Reverte
- Rebelde character
- Portrayed by: Dulce María
- First appearance: October 4, 2004
- Last appearance: June 2, 2006
- Created by: Cris Morena
In-universe information
- Occupation: Student(former) singer(present)
- Parents: Martín Reverte (father) Alma Rey (mother) Franco Colucci (step-father)
- Siblings: Mia Cáceres Colucci (step-sister) Jose Luján(step-sister)
- Husband: Diego Bustamante

- Played by: Dulce María

Most likely the most rebellious student in Elite Way, Roberta is the only daughter of Alma Rey (Ninel Conde), a famous singer who gave birth to Roberta when she was very young, supposedly with her first husband, Mr. Pardo. However, Roberta eventually finds out that her biological father is Martín Reverte, a teacher at Elite Way, who joined the school in order to find his child. Roberta is a reckless, strong young girl with a short temper and a big heart. She has the tendency to find problem wherever she goes, not only for herself, but for others too, but she always finds inventive ways to work her problems out. She is the co-female lead of RBD along with Lupita and Mia, with whom she at first has a difficult and conflicted relationship (Roberta thinks Mía's too ditzy, dumb and shallow). Her best friends are her roommates, Lupita and Jose Luján.

Roberta recruits a popular and handsome classmate, Diego Bustamante, to the band she is forming with Mía, Miguel, Lupita and Giovanni, but, in order to keep Diego's father León from finding out about the band, and to give Roberta an excuse to blow her mother off, they pretend they are dating. However, her strong personality and short fuses lead to a volatile relationship, with Roberta and Diego fighting a lot and hating each other. But, eventually, they fall deeply in love, although they both fight against their feelings and refuse to admit to it. They finally start dating for real, but eventually break up.

In season one, Roberta leaves against her will for a month in Spain with her adoptive father and is angry at herself when she spends a lot of time thinking about Diego. However, when she comes back, Diego has a new girlfriend: Paola, who really is a prostitute hired by León Bustamante to keep Diego away from Roberta, who León sees as inadequate for his son. After Diego breaks up with Paola, he makes a bet with his friends that he'll get Roberta to date him, and is successful. His friend Tomás tells Roberta the truth, and she dumps him, furious and heartbroken with his lie. However, Diego has sincerely fallen in love with Roberta during their relationship and tells her so, but she does not believe him.

To get Diego out of her head and her heart, Roberta becomes a serial dater throughout the series: she has relationships with Joaquin, Teo, Simon, Roger, Iñaki and Javier, who is Diego's nemesis and León's girlfriend's son. Javier actually helps León keep Diego away from Roberta, although he claims he wants to date her only to break her heart since she publicly humiliated him by turning him down. However, during this time Roberta and Diego become real friends, with Roberta helping Diego sort out his issues and solve his problems. Diego is outspoken about his love for Roberta, telling her he loves her whenever he has a chance; Roberta, however, will not confess to feeling the same.

During the third season, Roberta and Alma's unstable relationship explodes when Martín Reverte is revealed as Roberta's father. Roberta finally admits she is hurt that her mother was always away, working when she was a child and did not have time to be with her. She also admits that she was hurt that Alma acted more as a sister than as a mother when she was growing up. However, with Martín's help, she starts realizing that her mother truly loves her, and did everything there was in her power to give her the best life she could.

It's during this time that Roberta finally becomes friends with Mía, with Mía telling Roberta Alma and Franco are dating (and plan on marrying), and Roberta comforting Mía during her relationship problems with Miguel. It's Roberta who explains to Miguel why Mía was so hurt when Miguel said his girlfriend was Sabrina (after waking up from his coma). After a rocky patch in their relationship (Jose was jealous of Roberta having a growing family), best friends Roberta and Jose finally work out their problems and become family when Alma and Franco decide to adopt Jose.

Roberta also helps Diego break free of León's toxic influence and orchestrates Diego's mother Mabel's return from abroad. León forced Mabel to abandon their house and their son, and Roberta secretly works to bring Mabel back to Diego's life. When Roberta tells him what she has done, he is stunned and demands her reasons for it. Roberta finally admits that she did it because she loves him, and they make up for good. During Franco and Alma's wedding reception, Roberta and Diego discuss their nervousness about sex, with Diego anxious because Roberta's supposedly more experienced than he is (he has some experience, but she has dated more than he has). Roberta shyly admits she is a virgin, and the couple happily decides to take their time before that step.

=== Miguel Arango ===
Miguel Arango
- Rebelde character
- Portrayed by: Alfonso Herrera
- First appearance: October 4, 2004
- Last appearance: June 2, 2006
- Created by: Cris Morena
In-universe information
- Occupation: Student(former) Businessman(present)
- Parents: Elena Cervera (mother)
- Siblings: Loli Arango (sister)
- Spouse: Mia Colucci( wife)
- Children: 4?

- Played by: Alfonso Herrera

Miguel Arango is a noble, down-to-earth, really he is very handsome, young man. He is originally from Monterrey, Nuevo León (Mexico) which is where his mother and younger sister live in, but he can never afford to visit because his family is not very wealthy. Miguel is on a half scholarship causing him to be harassed by a secret society of students known as "La Logia", a sort of gang or mob organized to eliminate the "becados" (students with scholarships). He is in the Elite Way School to get revenge on Franco Colucci (since he believes Franco obligated his father to kill himself), not knowing he would fall for the man's daughter (Mia Colucci).

He later found out it was really Franco's brother Carlo who led Miguel's father to his death. When Miguel finds out he feels horrible (because he started dating Mia), and forgets his vengeful plans. Miguel has a constant on-again, off-again relationship with Mia, but they still and always have been madly in love from the first time they saw each other, even though they pretended that they hated each other. Miguel is friends with Roberta and is always helping her with anything she needs help on. Miguel has a strong sense of pride and dignity that often gets in the way of common sense. He finds himself in huge trouble with Mia after allegedly cheating on her with Sabrina Guzman (RBD's manager, event planner and the daughter of their producer) who has an extreme obsession with him and taking him away from Mia. She pretends to be his friend and after a heavy drinking session she makes him believe that they slept together and that she is pregnant (although this presumably never happened, but is furthered due to Sabrina's intention of blinding Miguel to her side and the fact that Miguel was drunk when the "cheat" occurred).

He later finds out through security camera videos that he never slept with her. He now tries desperately to win Mia back. He later falls into a coma due to an accident when he was hit by Gaston (the school's Prefect). Miguel wakes up from his coma and did not seem to remember anybody except Diego. A few days later, he remembers his father thanks to Roberta (after a strong session of screams on her behalf) and a long discussion, after he mistakenly says that Sabrina is his girlfriend instead of Mia (even though he likes Mia without remembering their history together), which makes Mia want to get far away from Miguel. Later Miguel finds out through Diego and Roberta that the love of his life is Mia. He then tries to tell Mia that he finally knows who she is and why he has been having these feelings for her, when he saw her for the first time (after he wakes up from his coma).

He later gets all his memories back during an RBD concert, ironically while Mia is singing Salvame (their love song). Later on she takes him back, after she learns about the lies Sabrina came up with. Plus she is in love with Miguel. In the final episode, he gave Mia an engagement ring.

In the alternative ending of Mia and Miguel, they are on a very beautiful bridge. Mia caresses her belly, implying that she had her first time with Miguel and that she is pregnant with Miguel. Miguel kisses Mia's hand sweetly and tells her that she is the most beautiful image in this world and that when he sees her every day he likes her more and Mia tells him that she always dreamed of a love story where everything was tender and full of details (when Miguel kisses her mia gives a wink) Miguel asks her what this relationship expects from them, she answers that now their relationship will be more fragile and stronger that she is no longer afraid to love him without limits.

=== Diego Bustamante ===
Diego Bustamante
- Rebelde character
- Portrayed by: Christopher von Uckermann
- First appearance: October 4, 2004
- Last appearance: June 2, 2006
- Created by: Cris Morena
In-universe information
- Occupation: Student(former) musician(present)
- Parents: León Bustamante (father); Mabel Bustamante (mother)
- Spouse: Roberta (wife)

- Played by: Christopher von Uckermann

Diego is a very handsome and talented boy who is the son of the corrupt political leader Leon Bustamante. In the beginning of the series he dates Vico but later dumps her because she cheats on him with Tomas because he did not ask her to go to his party. He also pretends to date Roberta so he will be able to play with RBD though he does really have feelings for her. After Roberta leaves for Spain because her dad is forcing her to go, Diego falls in love with Paula, a girl that is paid by Leon to sleep with him, because Diego was still a virgin. They fall in love and decide to run away together. Leon finds him and tells him the truth about Paula. Diego finds out that Paula not only slept with him, but also with his father, so he dumps her.

On a trip to Canada, he and Mia fake a relationship to make Miguel and Roberta jealous. It seems as though making each other jealous worked, because they ended the trip with a passionate kiss. Diego often shows that when he has problems, he tends to drink a lot, almost dying. He also shows that he is highly affected by the problems that surround his parents marriage. Towards the end of the first season, Diego falls, hitting his head, and pretends not to remember Roberta so that he can go out with her and win the bet he made with Tomas. He starts to fall in love with her, but when Roberta finds out why he went out with her she dumps him. He is crushed and tries to get her back. In the second season he wins the Student Body President elections because his team cheats and then shares the presidency with Roberta. He tries to get Roberta jealous in numerous occasions, with numerous girls including Sol and Lola, although he does not really last that long with any of them. In the third season, RBD start recording their album and go on tour. While on their way back Diego confesses his love for Roberta, because he thinks that the plane is going to crash and he is going to die. Roberta does the same. When the plane lands and they get off, he tells her that he was just kidding. However, later on he realizes that he really is in love and asks her to be his girlfriend, but she says no. After saving her and doing sweet things like giving her serenades, she finally decides to take a chance and they date. They break up later, because Roberta thinks that he is back to his old ways.

She finds out that it was just a misunderstanding and tries to get back with him, but he refuses, saying that he is tired of their on-and-off relationship. She then goes to find Diego's mom and brings her back, and that's when Diego and Roberta finally end up together for good. For the finale, they make out in a rowboat.

=== Lupita Fernandez ===
Lupita Fernandez
- Rebelde character
- Portrayed by: Maite Perroni
- First appearance: October 4, 2004
- Last appearance: June 2, 2006
- Created by: Cris Morena
In-universe information
- Occupation: Student(former) doctor(present)
- Parents: Rosa Fernández (mother) Mayra Fernández (aunt)
- Siblings: Dulce Fernández (sister) Lola (half-sister)
- Spouse: Santos Echague

- Played by: Maite Perroni

Guadalupe "Lupita" Fernandez is the good-girl-next-door in the series. She is beautiful, shy, sweet, and tries to be nice and friendly to everyone. She always chooses to do what is right. Her family is lower middle class, and she is at Elite Way thanks to a scholarship obtained to her by her aunt, who works at the school's cafeteria. Lupita gets along well with everyone, being close friends with Mía and best friends and roommates with Roberta and Jose Luján.

Lupita's character is reportedly inspired partially by a friend of the writers, named Lupita Martínez. Lupita is sweet and quiet, but she has a complicated relationship with family and puts too much pressure on herself because of her scholarship and because she does not want to disappoint her aunt. This often leads to Lupita angrily telling people off whenever things are too much to her which then will make her rebellious. However, she likes to be helpful. She is part of RBD, alongside Mía, Miguel, Diego, Roberta, and Giovanni, and she comes up with the band's name. She is a victim of La Logia, a secret society that strives to keep the school 'pure' and 'clean' of scholarship students.

Throughout the first season, Lupita's in a relationship with Nico, a poor Jewish boy who studies at Elite Way. Although they are in love with each other, Nico's family opposes the relationship, mainly because Lupita isn't Jewish. They even bring Nico's old girlfriend Karen, back to Mexico, hoping the girl will break him and Lupita up. At the end of the first season, because Nico's family is sending him away to Israel to study, Nico and Lupita have a symbolic marriage, witnessed by all of their friends. Nico leaves to Israel, promising to write to Lupita and to come back as soon as possible to marry her for real. Lupita is heartbroken that he is leaving, but has confidence that they'll work out in the end.

In the second season, Lupita finds out her father remarried and has a daughter with his second wife. Lupita's half-sister, Lola, is spoiled and jealous that Lupita is apparently their father's favorite. However, Lupita works hard to have a good relationship with her sister. Meanwhile, Lupita starts believing Nico has forgotten about her while in Israel, for he hasn't written to her at all since leaving. What she does not know is that Nico's mother has been holding his letters to Lupita back. Devastated, Lupita grows close to Santos, a classmate who has a crush on her.

However, Santos' feelings for Lupita worsens her relationship with Lola. Lola has a crush on Santos and believes Lupita's pursuing him out of spite. With time, the sisters work out their problems and grow closer. Lupita starts to accept she has fallen in love with Santos, and they start their relationship. When Nico comes back, ready to pick up where he left it off with Lupita, leaving her stunned and confused.

Nico's return puts a strain on Lupita's relationship with Santos, but, after a while, she realizes it's Santos who she loves and tells Nico that she is over him and only wants to be friends. Nico is heartbroken but accepts Lupita's decision and Lupita is with Santos in the end.

=== Giovanni Méndez Lopez ===
Giovanni Méndez
- Rebelde character
- Portrayed by: Christian Chávez
- First appearance: October 4, 2004
- Last appearance: June 2, 2006
- Created by: Cris Morena
In-universe information
- Occupation: Student(former) singer(present)
- Parents: Cosme Méndez (father); Luisa López (mother)

- Played by: Christian Chávez

Giovanni Méndez (originally called Juan) is a handsome, social, egotistical yet very funny guy. He is the character who engages in the most comical situations. He knows how to make friends, but has a problem with letting himself be taken by others and not knowing how to make his own decisions. He can also be very harsh at times. His best friends (and roommates) are Diego and Tomas.

Méndez dyes his hair of many colors throughout the series (at the end of the series it was rose red). Coming from a rather poor family, Méndez actively tries to hides his low-class beginnings and parentage. For that very same reason, Méndez always shoots for a chance at easy money. Méndez's parents had humble beginnings but became rich after his father won the lottery. However, the personal administrator of the family fortune committed fraud and stole all of the family's possessions, which forced them to return to their original lives as the owners of a butcher shop. Méndez is also a hopeless womanizer, unable to remain faithful to just one woman (which mostly explains why his relationship with Vico ended in failure). He gets into a relationship with Augustina, a rich girl who gives Giovanni expensive gifts at the drop of a dime, wooing Giovanni to her feet.

Although he is good at heart, some rich classmates consider him a sellout, which splits Giovanni between his devotion to one woman and his fixation for expensive gifts. But in spite of all that he continues going to school, and he is doing good with his personal life, family, friends, girls, fun activities, and as a member of RBD. He was also a member of "La Logia" (a secret society within the school hell-bent on getting scholarship students kicked out), until he betrays them to save Teo.

=== Jóse Luján Landeros ===
- Played by: Zoraida Gómez

The quintessential female athlete, raised in foster care because her wealthy mom did not want to raise her. Her tuition is paid by an anonymous benefactor.

She dated Teo briefly at the beginning of the series. She is Roberta and Lupita's best friend and roommate. She shares with Roberta an explosive attitude and overall rudeness. She has been under the harassment of the school prefect, Gaston, for quite a while, leading her to investigate the reason why Gaston's grudge towards her. However, due to her meddling in Gaston's obscure past, she gets extremely upset and desperately wants her out of the way. Lujan not only finds out that Gaston is her co-benefactor, but also her personal guardian since she was just a little girl. Jose Lujan comes to appreciate Gaston's efforts, and even justifies Gaston's harsh methods and constant abuse. However, their time together is cut short when Gaston dies after enduring a severe car crash. She begins acting hostile towards Roberta since she is jealous that Roberta has both parents (Alma and Martin) in her life while Jose Luján does not have a single parental figure. She is later adopted by Franco and Alma. At the end of the series, she gets back together with Teo.

=== Victoria "Vico" Paz ===
- Played by: Angelique Boyer

Victoria is Celina and Mia's best friend. She has a reputation for being "easy." At the beginning of the series, she is dating Diego and plays with his feelings because he cheated and lied to her. She played with his feelings by getting with Diego's best friend Tomas.

Vico comes from a family with a twisted background: her father left her, her mom, and her brother when Vico was very young. As a result, Vico was at the blunt end of her father's physical abuse and psychological torment in the second season when they meet again. While at school she felt helpless and unloved, at one point attempted taking pills to take her mind off things. Mia, her best friend, helped her get past it. Thanks to Rocco and professor Martin Reverte, they put Vico's father in rehab, which puts Rocco under a new light in Vico's eyes and they start dating. Rocco finds Vico's mom and brings them back together.

=== Celina Ferrer ===
- Played by: Estefania Villarreal

An overweight girl who often wallows in self-pity because she has never had a boyfriend. She is often insecure, although noble at heart. She is best friends with Vico and Mia, though she eventually became friends with Sol de la Riva, despite her being Mia's sworn rival. Sol later tries to steal away Celina's love interest, Max, and to end her friendship with Mia.

All the women in her family are slim and make Celina feel bad about being overweight. Her mother is ashamed of her for being overweight and criticizes her whenever she can. She claims she wishes Celina had never been born. Celina begins throwing up her food in order to lose weight, though she later ends up in the hospital and stops. In season three, Celina meets and falls in love with Max, who in turn becomes enamored with her. They consummate their relationship and she becomes pregnant with Max's child.

Villarreal comes back as Celina Ferrer in the 2022 Netflix reboot, as Elite Way School's new principal.

=== Pilar Gandía ===
- Played by: Karla Cossío

She is the daughter of the school principal and disliked by most of the students for that reason and because she is nosy and likes to gossip. She has a habit of getting even in a drastic way when men scorn her. She often speaks in English.

At the beginning of the series, she used to write an anonymous newspaper filled with gossip called Anónimos ("anonymous") about her peers. At first, she is cold and ruthless (especially towards Mia and her friends). It is later revealed that Pilar is the only female member of La Logia. Pilar is also romantically linked to Joaquín until he leaves school after having sex with her in her father's office.

In the second season, she joins the equally malicious Sol de la Riva, along with Raquel and Michelle, in a group called "Top Girls." However, in season three, due to the Gandías' divorce and her relationship with Tomas, she comes to her senses and begins to socialize a bit more, eventually becoming closer to her classmates.

On 2022 Netflix reboot, Pilar Gandia now marry to a famous producer named Camilo Cohen and is the mother and manager of the pop star sensation Jana Cohen Gandia. Jana is one of the new students in the EWS (acronym for Elite Way School)

=== Sol de la Riva ===
- Played by: Fuzz/María Fernanda Malo

Beautiful and sexy, she gets a lot of attention from students of Elite Way School and makes a very attractive impression, which first makes her a threat to Mia's popularity, but her cynical and deceptive personality quickly gets people to dislike her. Sol wants things to go her way no matter what and could be considered the only student at Elite Way whose intentions are not noble, no matter what the situation is. She is willing to ruin people's lives without regard of their personal feelings and does so via a multitude of convincing lies (although most of the time her plans tend to backfire).

She hates Mia and wants her to feel inferior at all costs. She briefly dated Diego in order to gain popularity in his Class President campaign. She also tried to make Miguel (Mia's boyfriend) fall for her, it did not work.

She has an affinity for the heartagram, a trademarked symbol of Finnish rock band HIM. She thinks she can do better than every girl in the school. She is often called Polly Pocket because of her height.

Her dream is to become a supermodel but her father will not let her. Although beautiful and having a nice body, she is too short and not skinny enough for model standards, but she thinks she is very skinny and perfect, but does not realize that model agencies do not think of her as model worthy. She is jealous of Mia because all the modeling agencies want Mia to be a model.

At the end of the third season, Sol appears in a magazine and her father is furious and enrolls her in a public school.

=== Raquel Byron-Sender ===
- Played by: Fernanda Polin

Recurring character in the first season, but becomes principal in the second season.

In the first season she is seen to be friends with a group of recurring character e.g. Michelle and Belen. She seems to be extremely stuck up and thinks she is superior to others but in the second season we truly see how cruel she is. She becomes friends with Sol which definitely has a bad influence on her. She breaks Teo and Jose Lujan and also tried to ruin Tomas and Anita's relationships. She mistreats people below her and does not care about people's feelings. After a while she gets tired of Sol's bad treatment to everyone and leaves her. At the end of the third series she is asked to model.

=== Michelle Pineda ===
- Played by: Michelle Renaud

Michelle is Raquel's best friend. The two of them join Sol and Pilar in a group named "Top Girls", though the group is eventually disbanded after Michelle, Raquel and Pilar get tired of Sol's attitude. Originally Michelle is mostly seen to be manipulated by Raquel. but she develops her own personality and becomes more caring towards her classmates.

=== Lola Fernández ===
- Played by: Viviana Ramos

Lola's parents pressured her to be like her half sister Lupita, which has made her dislike Lupita. Lola does not lose an opportunity to insult and scorn Lupita and blames her for most of her problems. She often uses her friend, Bianca to do her dirty work.

She had a short affair with Diego and Leonardo, which ended quickly due to her immaturity. Lola considers herself to be all alone in this world and thinks that no one could ever love her. It is later revealed that Lola is adopted and therefore, not biologically related to Lupita or her parents. After having a lengthy talk with Roberta, Lola has a new perspective on her life, and a new relationship with her sister.

=== Bianca Delight ===
- Played by: Allisson Lozano

Lola's shy best friend who does whatever Lola says. She eventually becomes tired of Lola mistreating her and pushing her around and she becomes more independent. She also had a crush on Rocco.

=== Augustina ===
- Played By: Georgina Salgado

Although we do not know much about her, we do know that she is obsessed with Giovanni and buys him expensive gifts to get him to like her (they also dated for some time). She is good friends with Lola and Bianca, and like Bianca, she lets Lola make all decisions for her. Her father made her stop dating Giovanni. She is seen as the naive girl and soon learns about Giovanni flirting with other girls, so she begins flirting with Iñaki, much to Giovanni's dismay. She acts like they are friends until the La Gran Final when she makes out with Iñaki right in front of Giovanni and Lola and is with Inaki.

=== Téo Ruiz Palacios ===
- Played by: Eddy Vilard

In the beginning of the series Teo is very quiet and shy. Later on he gets a makeover. He falls in love with Roberta in the first season. After Roberta tells him that she really does not love him, they break up. Teo was tortured by La Logia after they found out he was planning on revealing their identities and ending La Logia. He had to be medically treated and while in the hospital Jose Lujan visits him and kisses him. Jose denies this but Teo starts to like Jose. On a trip to Canada he tries to get closer to her. Later on they start going out. In the second season, his mother gets admitted into a mental institution after having a breakdown regarding her elder son's death (she blames this on Teo). Later on he dumps Jose in order to go out with Raquel Byron. They go out even though Teo gets jealous when he sees her with another guy. In the third season Teo wants to get back with Jose Lujan but she does not really seem to care because she is too preoccupied with her own problems. But it seems that they do get together in the end of the series.

=== Tomás Goycolea ===
- Played by: Jack Duarte

Although he is good at heart, he is a party boy and does things without considering the consequences. His best friends and roommates are Diego and Giovanni. He comes from a very wealthy family whom he does not have much contact with; he'd rather spend his weekend at school than with his family, whom does not pay much attention to him. He first gets involved with Vico, while she was still dating Diego. Then he develops a crush on Lupita. He then he gets involved with Anita and Sol. His friends were against his relationship with Sol, for it interfered with their plans to pair him up with Anita (the school's cafeteria girl, who is very smart and even earned a scholarship but needs to pay for the other half of her tuition, hence her job at the school. She has a deep love interest for Tomas). After Tomas starts dating Sol, Anita refuses to do homework assignments for Diego and Giovanni, since she is no longer friends with Tomas and has no other connection to them. Giovanni then makes her believe that Tomas is in love with her, she then accepts to do their work for them but they have to pay a price... To get out of paying, Giovanni and Diego try to split Tomas and Sol. Their plan is a success but after Anita leaves, Tomas develops a deep relationship with Pilar, for the rest of the series.

=== Nico Huber ===
- Played by: Rodrigo Nehme

A Jewish teen who is pressured by his family to dump his Catholic girlfriend (Lupita) in favor of his childhood sweetheart. Nico and Lupita have a symbolic marriage on the first season at the end. Introverted, he hates outdoor activities. Nico was sent on a student exchange program to Israel, and all contact with Lupita was nixed thanks to his mother's interference. He returns in an attempt to see Lupita again, but is surprised when he sees her in company of Santos. He loves Lupita, but Lupita does not like him anymore (she thought he severed all ties with her). Nico wants to win Lupita back, but she rejects him for Santos. Lupita gets back with Nico for a while but then breaks up with him due to his constant jealousy. In the end he returns to Israel and most likely ended up in a forced relationship with Karen.

=== Rocco Bezauri ===
- Played by: Diego Boneta

A somewhat geeky and highly obnoxious student who passes his time by filming other students on his hand-held camera, which makes them mad. He is very misunderstood by his parents After tips by Santos, he tries to become less "fresa" (preppy) and imitates Santos. Rocco starts to make moves on Vico, stemming from Vico's reputation of being "easy", but later on, he falls for her for real. He tries his best to help out Vico in her troubled times, despite Vico's refusal and constant rejections. It seems his attempts pay off during a school trip to Puerto Vallarta, where Vico finally opens her heart to Rocco. Rocco also has great singing potential, as he sings a couple of songs throughout the series.

=== Santos Echagüe ===
- Played by: Derrick James

He is first introduced in the beginning of the second season as an outcast. He later changes after an incident with the ex-principal. After, he starts socialising more and becomes good friends with Leornando, but there friendship is cut short when Leonardo moves away to play soccer. He becomes a hot gothic rocker who has a crush on Lupita. He knows she likes him back. Lupita's sister Lola has a crush on him, so there is a love triangle there. Santos is easy-going and relaxed for the most part. He always keeps his cool and never exasperates himself. He serves as a loyal advisory to his best friend, Miguel. He acts as a middleman between Lupita and Lola's constant arguments. He is willing to put everything on the line for his loved ones and is dating Lupita at the end of the series.

=== Leonardo Francisco Blanco ===
- Played by: Eleazar Gómez

Tomas' cousin. He is from a small town, a wrestler, and from the get-go, Diego does not like him (since the beginning of season 2 because he thinks Leo threw rocks at him). He has a crush on Lupita, but Lola thinks he likes her. He leaves to go to another school after he received a letter to play in America (a soccer team).

=== Mauricio Garzo Alebrija ===
- Played by: Ernesto Díaz

He tried to compete with Tomas to get Sol to like him in the beginning of the second season. He is very proud of being rich and looks down on people who are not. But his story line fades as the second season and he tells Tomas he has to leave Elite Way because of what his father wants for him.

=== Javier Alanis ===
- Played by: Miguel Angel Biaggio

Diego's (evil) future stepbrother, who has a crush on Roberta. He hates Diego because Roberta loves him. Javier will do anything to get Roberta to like him, even telling her convincing lies about Diego to turn her away from him; even though Roberta, nor Jose Lujan know that he likes them. He is supposed to go to a different school because of Diego but his mother changes her mind. He lies to Roberta about it and tries to escape with her when Diego calls her and tells her about Javier's lies. In the end he is taken out of Elite Way because of Giovanni. Giovanni talked to Javier's father and told him that he was Javier's boyfriend. Javier's dad gets mad and tells him to go pack his stuff because he is taking him out of the school.

=== Joaquin Mascaró ===
- Played by: Michel Gurfi

Both Mia and Roberta's love interest in the beginning of the series. He dated them both at the same time. At first he seemed like a threat to Diego's popularity but his manipulating ways got people to dislike him very quickly. He also manipulated Tomas into selling drugs and nearly got Tomas expelled. He later had a relationship with Pilar, until her father caught them together in his office and forbid Pilar to see him. Pasqual had difficulty expelling him from Elite Way due to business ties with Joaquin's family. During sport practice Joaquin nearly dies due to him consuming drugs and Mia, Vico and Celina show Pasqual a video of Joaquin selling drugs to Vico. He is immediately expelled and he never returns to Elite Way. Enrique (Ethics professor) goes on sees Joaquin at a rehabilitation centre and it is revealed he constantly gets involved with drugs because of his fathers neglect. Pilar has a hard time with him leaving the school and then has the doubt that she might be pregnant with his baby, but it is revealed she isn't when the pregnancy test comes out negative.

=== Dante ===
- Played by: Marco Antonio Valdés

He is seen to be friends with Bianca and Lola, even though Lola finds him childish and annoying. He has a secret crush on Lola. He tries to make his move on Lola only to find himself slapped and alone. Lola then feels sorry for him and they kiss. Pascual catches them, and Roberta bails them out. Poor Dante is then left as just a friend. That is though, on the Gran Finale. After Giovanni's dumped by Augustina, he tries to hit on Lola but Dante comes to her rescue and they walk away together like boyfriend and girlfriend.

=== Marcelino ===
- Played by: Dylan Obed

Marcelino is a little orphan boy that Roberta brings to the school in the 1st season. She hides him out in the back of the school. Diego finds out and says that he'll tell the school but he uses Marcelino as a way to win Roberta back. Pilar finds out about Marcelino and tells the school in her paper. Marcelino is later adopted by Pepa, who works as a personal assistant for Roberta's mom (Alma Rey). But then his brother (Oso) escapes from jail and pressures him to go away with him. Later, they find him safe and sound and he is reunited with Pepa.

== Adults ==
=== Franco Colucci ===
- Played by: Juan Ferrara

He is a high-end fashion designer and the father of Mia. Miguel works for him, which causes him to become quite affectioned with him, treating him as if he was his son. Franco is known as "Daddy" (since that is how Mia calls Franco). Franco refuses to talk to Mia about his mother, even going out of his way telling her she died, when she was alive the entire time. In season 1, Franco dates a lawyer from his past named Valeria Oliver, the women he was set to marry before he left her for Marina, Mia's mother. Valeria leaves Franco at the altar, revealing that she never loved him and only dated him to get revenge on him. Franco ends up falling in love with Alma Rey and they get married.

=== Alma Rey ===
- Played by: Ninel Conde

A famous model and singer who is very sexy and always gets the attention of the students very easily. Which makes Roberta, her daughter, somewhat jealous, because her mother gets more attention than her. She is a single mother, even though she used the last name of her ex-husband to give her daughter Roberta a true family name. She overprotects Roberta. Roberta resents her mother for focusing on her career over her when she was growing up. Despite their rocky relationship, Alma loves her daughter and does what she can to support her. Alma eventually falls in love with Franco Colucci and they get married at the end of the show.

=== Leon Bustamante ===
- Played by: Enrique Rocha

Diego's father and a well-known politician. Very cold and is the villain in the story. does not like Roberta because he thinks she is a bad influence on Diego. He thinks she is beneath him. A strict man, who always wants to win at all costs. He kicks Mabel out of Diego's life when he finds out Mabel had another man in her life . Leon then tells Diego that she walked out on them for selfish reasons . He takes joy in torturing Diego and embarrasses him in at any given chance. He owns exactly 51% of Elite Way School. He always gets what he wants, at any cost. He even pays a prostitute [Paula] to sleep with Diego so he could lose his virginity, which causes Diego to fall in love with her. The relationship did not last much after he found out why she met him. Leon developed a relationship with a woman called Ines and was planning to marry her until she changed her mind. Diego then finds out his dad was the one who told his mother to leave and that his father was the reason why they kicked Roberta out. Close to the end, Roberta comes back and Diego develops a hatred for his dad and then, eventually, with the help of Roberta, he cuts loose and confronts him leaving, Leon cold and alone.

=== Pascual Gandia ===
- Played by: Felipe Nájera

The power-hungry, yet idiotic head of the school, who often takes pleasure in the misfortune of the students. He has poor knowledge of English. Even though he tries to be an imposing authority figure, he comes out more as a dim-witted principal who is easily manipulated not only by his superiors, but also by the same students he wants to control. Sometimes, his antics and raging outbursts come out as more comical than menacing (especially his silly evil laugh). Also tends to act clumsy when in the presence of a gorgeous woman. He used to be in a relationship with Alma Rey. He is going through a divorce with his wife Galia, since she considers him to be 'weak' and 'easily manipulated' by Diego's father (the legal owner of the Elite Way School). In the last episode we see Galia winking at him. They talk privately at the pool and they somewhat get back together. In the last few scenes, Galia gives him a peck on the lips for the audience. Then Pascual pulls her down and slaps a mouthful on her, with a round of applause from the audience. Despite his clumsy attitude and often meddlesome ways, he still loves his daughter Pilar very much and only wishes for her well-being.

=== Gastón Diestro ===
- Played by: Tony Dalton

The new professor, who is just as unpleasant as Esteban. He has a huge crush on Mía, and they finally began a relationship, much to the disapproval of Mía's father. Mía went out with Gastón to get Miguel (her true love) jealous. His past was just as obscure as Esteban's, as indicated by further investigations made by Jose Lujan, whom Gaston likes to downgrade and humiliate at any given chance. Jose Lujan stole his laptop, and finds information that leads her to believe that Gaston is her secret benefactor, but Gaston repeatedly denies it. After a while, Gaston gets annoyed by Jose Lujan's meddling with his affairs, and decides to get her out of the Elite Way School once and for all. In reality, Gaston's father (Ricardo Sisniega) took care of Jose Lujan when she was a dirty street orphan because she had saved his life (although how she did so is still unknown). Gaston's father had always compared Jose Lujan's strength of will to Gaston's weak spirit, which fueled Gaston's anger. When his father died in prison, Gaston was forced to look after Jose Lujan and see to her tuition as per his father's last wish. Although Gaston tried to blame Jose Lujan for his miserable existence, he really did love Lujan like a sister, as he admitted to in his final breath. He died after being involved a heavy car accident.

=== Enrique Madariaga ===
- Played by: Patricio Borghetti

Bohemian foreign professor who was always trying to solve everyone's problems. He is really loved by the students even though his record claims he is a murderer. It is revealed that his wife and son died in a car accident while he was driving, which makes him feel guilty for it. After having a strained relationship during the first season with new teacher Renata, he gets a "fresh start" with her. They leave Elite Way School to help less fortunate students and get married. He fades from the storyline in the second season (going to start a school in Chiapas for poor children) but then comes back near the end of the third season. During the first episode of his return, he runs into Professor Julia, whom he was engaged with but left for Julia's best friend.

=== Mayra Fernández ===
- Played by: Leticia Perdigon

Lupita's Aunt and worked in the cafeteria of the Elite Way School, until Font fired her for no apparent reason. Very involved with all the students and has a great sense of humor. Lupita's mother does not like this because she thinks Mayra is a bad example for Lupita, but Lupita loves her for being there when she most needed her. She has a feisty attitude and is very abrupt with what she says.

=== Alicia Salazar ===
- Played by: María Fernanda García

Mr. Gandía's secretary. She is easily manipulated by students but often saves the day for Gandia. She provides comic relief for the series.

=== Hilda Acosta ===
- Played by: Lourdes Canale

The history professor at Elite Way School. Hilda has devoted her entire life to teaching, but had a romance in her youth with Professor Hilario (played by Héctor Gómez). They meet each other again at Elite Way School after decades. Though Hilda was reluctant to be with Hilario at the beginning, they marry each other towards the end of the first season. However, at the beginning of the second season it is revealed that Hilario died on the day they were set to marry. Hilda continues teaching at Elite Way. She sometimes aids her students, as she does when she gives Lujan shelter at her home when she is suspended by Gastón.

=== Esteban Nolasco Landeros ===
- Played by: Aitor Iturrioz

The former professor of the school. At the beginning of the season 1 was a very good person, nice, funny and good chemistry with the students almost equal to that of Madariaga, but was dismissed for failing to discipline students. After returning to school hired by Mendiola, but he was hired too by Gaston, which explains the change of clothing, hairstyle and attitude; so very strict and kept harassing Jóse Luján (target of Gaston) and Vico. Has a crush on Mía and Alma Rey. Was suspected as an ex-convict serial-killer due to an unusual relationship with the Gaston's father Ricardo Sisniega. He also had something to do with La Logia (a secret society hell-bent on getting scholarship students out of the school) which still remains a mystery. After overindulging in one of his punishments to students and even more against Lujan, Esteban is dismissed by the promise of Mendiola return his job as that case forget, although never returns is mentioned several times by Gaston.

=== Director Casildo Font ===
- Played by: Alejandro Peraza

An extremely strict principal who ran the school while Pascual was getting his master's degree in New York. Eventually, he was framed by Santos (Derrick James) and fired on the charge of child pornography (he had inappropriate pictures of Sol). He is never heard from again.

=== Marina Cáceres ===
- Played by: Nailea Norvind

The biological mother of Mia who was often portrayed as faceless character who lived in New York as fashion designer having her face always covered by a sculpture, in the 1st half of the show. When we first see her at the airport, Franco and her look each other in the eyes, and then he tells Mia that is one of his friends. She is hugs Mia, trying her best not break out in tears. After they leave she is seen touching her shoulders saddened. She has a few scenes after that but mostly very minor. That is until we see her at the RBD concert event. She cries when Mia sings "Salvame". At the end of the scene, she kisses a complimentary poster of the group. She then wants to find Mia and tell her the truth. Mia has another meeting with Marina when she is with Lupita and Santos. When she is asked if was the same person from the airport she lies and plays it off like they had never met. Marina is soon more confident to tell Mia the truth. But Alma is furious because she will not leave Franco alone. Marina tells her about wanting to meet Mia. Franco tells Mia the truth and all hell breaks loose. Mia wants to meet her mother no matter what Franco says. Mia and Marina meet at a sushi bar with only two words said before the end of the episode. Mia: Mama?. Marina: Hija. They hug and Marina and Mia become closer. Mia soon forgives Franco. Marina and Mia become close. When Mia has to leave for a concert with RBD. Marina was going to be a no show then Alma suggests that she should go. Marina shows up at the last minute to wave goodbye. On La Gran Final Marina is seen kissing Franco and Alma on the cheek thus showing they have all become friends one way or another
