= Agustín Arana =

Mexican actor

Agustín Arana Flores
- Born: Agustín Arana Flores; 27 August 1968 (age 58); Orizaba, Veracruz, Mexico
- Occupations: Actor, singer
- Years active: 1998–present
- Children: 2

Agustín Arana (born Agustín Arana Flores on August 27, 1968) is a Mexican actor and singer. He was a member of the Mexican singing group Garibaldi. This was the second Garibaldi group that succeeded the first group of the same name. He grew up in a farm and had many horses. His favorite was Lagartijó, a loyal animal who only let Agustín mount it. He was a semi-professional boxer and fought throughout Mexico.

== Filmography ==
=== Television ===
Year	Title	Role	Notes
2001–2002	Salomé	Raúl	Special appearance
2002	Cómplices al rescate	Rodolfo Garcia	Special appearance
2001–2007	Mujer casos de la vida real		TV series
2002–2003	Clase 406	Ramiro	Supporting role
2003	De pocas, pocas pulgas	Claudio Zapata	Supporting role
2003–2004	Mariana de la Noche	Oropo	Supporting role
2004–2005	Rebelde	Darío	Supporting role
2005	Piel de otoño	Pablo Castañeda	Supporting role
2006–2007	La fea más bella	Omar Carvajal	Supporting role
2006–2007	Amar sin límites	Luis Felipe Peña	Supporting role
2007	Al diablo con los guapos		Theatrical performance
2007	La familia P.Luche		TV series
2007–2008	Palabra de Mujer	Julián Medina	Antagonist
2008	Las tontas no van al cielo	Mario Landazuri	Special appearance
2008	Piel de estrellas	Himself/Presenter	TV show
2008	Mujer Dinámica	Himself/Presenter	TV show
2008-09	Un gancho al corazón	Jeronimo Sermeño	Antagonist
2008-09	Alma de hierro	Gibrán	Supporting role
2009	Mujeres asesinas	Javier Díaz	Episode: "Julia, encubridora"
2009–2010	Hasta que el dinero nos separe	Daniel Zepeda de los Monteros	38 episodes
2010	Zacatillo, un lugar en tu corazón	Santiago	3 episodes
2010–2011	Para volver a amar	Leonardo Torres	Supporting role
2011	La fuerza del destino	Robert Domínguez	30 episodes
2011–2012	Esperanza del corazón	Franco Duprís Dávila	Protagonist
2012–2013	La mujer del Vendaval	Emiliano Ferreira	Supporting role
2013–2014	Qué pobres tan ricos	Saúl Ballesteros	167 episodes
2014	Como dice el dicho	Hernán	TV series
2015	Amores con trampa	Florencio Gallardo	Supporting role
2016	Un camino hacia el destino	Ignacio Ordóñez	Supporting role
2017	Papá a toda madre	Sebastian	Recurring role

== Awards and nominations ==
Year	Award	Category	Telenovela	Result
2007	Premios TVyNovelas	Best Co-star Actor	La Fea Más Bella	Nominated
2009	Premios TVyNovelas	Best Co-star Actor	Palabra de Mujer	Nominated
