= La mujer del Vendaval =

Mexican telenovela

- Genre: Telenovela
- Based on: Un esposo para Estela by Camilo Hernández
- Written by: Antonio Abascal; Carlos Daniel González
- Screenplay by: Gabriela Ortigoza
- Directed by: Mauricio Rodríguez; Patricia Reyes Spíndola; José Elías Moreno
- Starring: Ariadne Díaz; José Ron; Chantal Andere; Alfredo Adame; María Marcela; Manuel "Flaco" Ibáñez; Agustín Arana; Florencia del Saracho; Michelle Renaud; Patricio Borghetti; Javier Jattin
- Theme music composer: Jorge Eduardo Murguía; Mauricio Arriaga
- Opening theme: "Cómo estar sin ti" by Carlos Baute
- Country of origin: Mexico
- Original language: Spanish
- No. of episodes: 167

Production
- Executive producer: Mapat L. de Zatarain
- Producer: Marco Vinicio
- Cinematography: Óscar Morales; Leonardo Hernández; Marco Vinicio
- Editors: Óscar Morales; Gabriela Torres
- Camera setup: Multi-camera
- Production company: Televisa

Original release
- Network: Canal de las Estrellas
- Release: November 12, 2012 – June 30, 2013

Related
- Cachito de cielo; De que te quiero, te quiero

La mujer del Vendaval (English title: The Lady from Vendaval) is a Mexican telenovela produced by Mapat L. de Zatarain for Televisa. It is a remake of the Venezuelan telenovela Un esposo para Estela. On November 12, 2012, Canal de las Estrellas started broadcasting La Mujer Del Vendaval weekdays at 6:15pm, replacing Cachito de cielo. The last episode was broadcast on June 30, 2013, with De que te quiero, te quiero replacing it the following day.

Ariadne Díaz and José Ron star as the main protagonists, while Chantal Andere, Marco Muñoz, Manuel "Flaco" Ibáñez, Florencia del Saracho, and Javier Jattin star as the main antagonists.

Production of La Mujer Del Vendaval officially started on August 16, 2012. In the United States, Univision aired La Mujer Del Vendaval from August 19, 2013, to April 4, 2014.

== Plot ==
Marcela Morales is about to get the inheritance her mother left her. As a condition to receive it, her mother established she should be married. Such legacy is Marcela's last hope for saving the ranch which is mortgaged. For this matter, she puts an ad in the paper looking for a husband to be. Alessandro Casteló, one of the applicants, is rich, and the vice-president and heir to the important hotel chain, Toscana.

Hiding behind masks, Marcela and Alessandro meet at the beach. On the night of their encounter, a valuable family's necklace disappears from Alessandro's home, making Marcela the main suspect of such robbery.

In order to recover the necklace, Alessandro shows up at the ranch as Marcela's husband to be. Nevertheless, the intense passion he feels for her and getting to know her, change his original goal making him want to prove her innocence and win her love for real. For that purpose, he will have to overcome a series of obstacles that prevent their love from coming true.

== Cast ==
Confirmed as of August 16, 2012.

=== Main ===
- Ariadne Díaz as Marcela Morales de Casteló
- José Ron as Alessandro Casteló Berrocal
- Chantal Andere as Octavia Cotilla Vda. de Hernández
- Alfredo Adame as Luciano Casteló
- María Marcela as Silvana Berrocal de Casteló
- Manuel "Flaco" Ibáñez as Timoteo Quiñónez
- Agustín Arana as Emiliano Ferreira Preciado
- Florencia de Saracho as María Laura Morales Aldama
- Michelle Renaud as Alba María Morales Aldama
- Patricio Borghetti as Cristian Serratos
- Javier Jattin as Camilo Preciado

=== Also main ===
- Odiseo Bichir as Mateo Reyna
- Magda Karina as Sagrario Aldama
- Thelma Madrigal as Nisa Casteló Berrocal
- Lourdes Reyes as Ilse Sánchez
- Rossana San Juan as Valeria Ferreira Preciado
- Francisco Rubio as Amadeo Rosado Sánchez
- Jaume Mateu as Mauro Urquiza
- Jorge Ortín as Eulogio Ladrón
- Sachi Tamashiro as July Barbosa
- Mariana Karr as Conchita Pimentel
- Mauricio Martínez as Mike Cisneros
- Zoraida Gómez as Nuria Arévalos Andrade de Serratos
- Jorge Gallegos as Lencho Quiñónez
- José Carlos Farrera as Román Rosado Sánchez
- Marco Muñoz as Severo Morales Iturbide

=== Special participation ===
- Polo Monárrez as José Manuel "Cuchi"
- Chao as Néstor de la Rosa
- Juan Carlos Nava as Cirilo "Gordo" Barrios
- Óscar Ferretti as Leonel
- Anahí Fraser as Norma Martinez
- Jorge van Rankin as Antonio Figueres
- Eugenio Bartilotti as Giocondo de la Fuente
- Mónica Zorti as Rosa Cruz
- Iliana de la Garza as Penélope
- Fernanda López as Inés Bernal
- Lucía Zerecero as Linda
- Carla Cardona as Damiana Hernández Cotilla
