= Azul (TV series) =

- Also known as: Blue
- Genre: Telenovela; Romance; Adventure; Family
- Directed by: Roberto Gómez Fernández
- Starring: Kate del Castillo; Armando Araiza; Keiko; Alma Muriel; Patricia Reyes Spíndola; Armando Silvestre; Alfonso Iturralde
- Theme music composer: Osni Cassab
- Opening theme: Instrumental
- Ending theme: Instrumental
- Country of origin: Mexico
- Original language: Spanish
- No. of episodes: 55

Production
- Executive producers: Pinkye Morris; Yuri Breña
- Production locations: Filming; Televisa San Ángel; Mexico City, Mexico
- Running time: 41-44 minutes
- Production company: Televisa

Original release
- Network: Canal de las Estrellas
- Release: January 8 – March 22, 1996

Azul (English title: Blue) is a Mexican telenovela produced by Pinkye Morris and Yuri Breña for Televisa. It premiered on Canal de las Estrellas on January 8, 1996 and ended on March 22, 1996.

The telenovela stars Kate del Castillo, Armando Araiza and Elvira Monsell.

== Plot ==
Alejandra is a young woman who works at the Dolphinarium is an amusement park in Mexico City, works with Juanjo and Fina to care for dolphins and Keiko, a tender orca, who lives in the park and entertains visitors.

== Cast ==
- Kate del Castillo as Alejandra
- Armando Araiza as Enrique Valverde
- Keiko as Keiko
- Alma Muriel as Elena Curi
- Patricia Reyes Spíndola as Martha
- Armando Silvestre as Ernesto Valverde
- Alfonso Iturralde as Dr. Carlos Grimberg
- Elvira Monsell as Paz
- Lucila Mariscal as Fina
- Juan Carlos Serrán as Dr. Solórzano
- Tiaré Scanda as Karina
- Arturo Beristáin as Gustavo Galván
- Gabriela Hassel as Yeni
- Roberto Ramírez Garza as Ramón
- Aída Naredo as Lola
- Gustavo Ganem as Pancho
- Oscar Uriel as Juanjo
- Eduardo Schillinsky as Sergio
- Julio Bracho as Luis Aguirre
- Zoraida Gómez as La Chamos
- Eleazar Gómez as Lupito
- Hixem Gómez as Héctor
- Ulises Ávila as Ulises
- Daniel Habif as Ricky
- Paulo Serrán as Beto
- Pedro Marás as Det. Mendoza
- Manuel Sánchez Martínez as El Tranzas
- Mané Macedo as Julia
- Renata Fernández as Renata
- Jaime Gerner as El Sueco
- José Antonio Coro as Dr. Meyer
- Claudia Eliza Aguilar as Obrera
- Socorro Avelar as Directora
- Raúl Araiza as Javier Valverde
- Moisés Iván as El Muelas
- Mauricio Aspe as Roberto
- Maristel Molina as María
- Silvia Contreras as Delia
- Galilea Montijo as Mara
- Rudy Casanova as Dr. Lefebre
- Ana de la Reguera as Cecilia
- Elías Rubio as Rubén
- Anabell Gardoqui as Cecilia
- Laura Montalvo as Clara
- Carlos Martínez Chávez as Dr. Serrán
- Luis Bernardos as Vicente
- Fernando Arturo Jaramillo as Locutor
