= Edron Academy =

The Edron Academy

Location
- Cal. Desierto de los Leones; Mexico City, Mexico City; Mexico; 19.33507°N 99.25203°W

Information
- Type: Private school
- Opened: 1963; 63 years ago
- Grades: K-13
- Language: English, Spanish, French, Mandarin
- Campus: Urban, 9 acres (3.6 ha)
- Slogan: Once Edron, always Edron and always together
- Programmes: International Baccalaureate, Mexican Diploma, IGCSE
- Website: edron.edu.mx

The Edron Academy (El Colegio Británico) is a British international school located in Álvaro Obregón, Mexico City.

The Edron Academy was founded in 1963. It has a bicultural and bilingual curriculum.

The school is split between two campuses on either side of Avenida Desierto de los Leones. The Kinder is located in the original hacienda building with the Primary and Secondary schools being located on the opposite side of the road.

The school is open to students from 18 months to 18 years of age and has approximately 1,000 students.

== School structure ==
Mexico	US	UK
Pre-Kinder	Daycare	Nursery
Kinder	Pre-School	Reception
Pre-primaria	Kindergarten	Year 1
1° de Primaria	Grade 1	Year 2
2° de Primaria	Grade 2	Year 3
3° de Primaria	Grade 3	Year 4
4° de Primaria	Grade 4	Year 5
5° de Primaria	Grade 5	Year 6
6° de Primaria	Grade 6	Year 7
1º de Secundaria	Grade 7	Year 8
2° de Secundaria	Grade 8	Year 9
3° de Secundaria	Grade 9	Year 10
1° de Preparatoria	Grade 10	Year 11
2° de Preparatoria	Grade 11	Year 12
3° de Preparatoria	Grade 12	Year 13

== Education system ==
Kindergarten

Students in the kindergarten follow the English National Curriculum, following the Early Years Foundation Stage framework and into Key Stage 1. Students follow the Mexican curriculum as stipulated by the Secretariat of Public Education (SEP) alongside the English curriculum.

Primary

Students in the Primary school study a combination of the English National Curriculum alongside the Mexican curriculum.

Secondary

Students in the Secondary school study the English National Curriculum in years 7 to 9 (key stage 3 link) and IGCSE in years 10 and 11 with the final examinations taken at the end of year 11.

== History ==
It was founded in 1963 by Edward Foulkes, a Welshman who worked in Mexico in the publishing business and as a teacher for the British Council, and by Ronald Stech, a Canadian who became the school's first administrator. Foulkes, who had previously founded Greengates School, had left by 1961, selling his share to Henry Coehlo.

In 1985, it moved from San Ángel to its present site in a residential area close to the forested hills of Desierto de los Leones. At the same time, it achieved its bicultural status through incorporation with the Mexican education authority.

In 1995 the Edron became an IB world school.

In September 2014, the Edron Academy was inspected by the Independent Schools Inspectorate (ISI). The findings of the inspection were positive. The Edron Academy became a COBIS (Council of British International Schools) accredited member school in 2019.

== Associations and accreditations ==
The Edron Academy is accredited nationally and internationally by:

- National Autonomous University of Mexico (UNAM or Universidad Nacional Autónoma de México)
- Secretariat of Public Education (SEP or Secretaría de Educación Pública)
- International Baccalaureate (IB)
- The International General Certificate of Secondary Education (IGCSE)

== Notable alumni ==
- Jennifer Clement (born 1960), writer
- DBC Pierre (born 1961), writer
- Mario Iván Martínez (born 1962), actor
- Khotan Fernández (born 1973), actor
- Gabriel Soto (born 1975), actor and model
- Gael García Bernal (born 1978), actor and director
- Ximbo (born 1979), musician
- Alfonso Herrera (born 1983), actor and musician
- José María de Tavira (born 1983), actor and director
- Ana Victoria (born 1983), musician and singer
- Karla Cossío (born 1985), actress
- Ximena Sariñana (born 1986), actress and musician
- Eiza González (born 1990), actress and musician
- Ricardo Salinas Pliego (born 1955), billionaire
- Diego Luna (born 1979), actor and director
