= Florencia del Saracho =

Mexican actress (born 1981)

Florencia de Saracho
- Born: December 4, 1981 (age 44); Hermosillo, Sonora, Mexico
- Occupation: actress
- Years active: 2007 - present
- Spouse: Santiago Aguirre “El Toro” (2013 to Present)
- Children: Santiago Aguirre Jr, Aitana Aguirre, Maria Aguirre.

Florencia de Saracho (Spanish pronunciation: [floˈɾensja ðe saˈɾatʃo]; born December 4, 1981) is a Mexican actress.

== Biography ==
She began her career in the soap opera, Las vías del amor (2002) in the role of Pamela Fernandez. Then she joined the cast of Piel de otoño, in 2005, in a role with Alessandra Rosaldo. She was featured in the role of Liliana Mendoza in Sueños y Caramelos. In 2006, she was a contributor to teen telenovela Rebelde as Romina and appeared in Yo amo a Juan Querendón as Marely Cachón de la Cueva. In 2008, she portrayed the evil Mariela Fregoso in Juro que te amo and in the following year, played Elena Parra-Ibañez in Mar de Amor joining in 2010, the cast of Cuando me enamoro, substituting Wendy González in the role of Adriana Beltran.

In 2012, the producer Carlos Moreno Laguillo cast her in Amor Bravio as Natalia Ferrer Gutierrez. The same year, the producer Mapat called her to play a second "villain" role as María Laura Morales in La Mujer Del Vendaval.

In 2013, she announced she was temporarily removed from the world of acting because she wanted to devote time to her husband and family, with the La mujer del vendeval last participation in soap operas. In New Year 2014, January 9, she became the mother of a boy named Santiago.

In 2015 she returned to telenovelas, convened by the producer Carlos Moreno Laguillo for the soap opera A que no me dejas next to Camila Sodi, Osvaldo Benavides, Leticia Calderon and Arturo Peniche.

== Filmography ==
=== Telenovelas ===
Year	Title	Character	Note
2018	Y mañana será otro día	Ximena	Supporting role
2015-16	A que no me dejas	Karen Rangel	Supporting role
2012-13	La Mujer Del Vendaval	María Laura Morales Aldama	Antagonist
2012	Amor Bravío	Natalia Ferrer Gutierrez Jimenez	Supporting Role
2010-11	Cuando me enamoro	Adriana Sánchez Beltrán #2	Supporting Role
2009-10	Mar de Amor	Elena Parra-Ibañez	Co-protagonist
2008	Juro que te amo	Mariela Fregoso	Main Antagonist
2007	Yo amo a Juan Querendón	Marely Cachón de la Cueva	Co-protagonist
2006	Rebelde	Romina	Supporting Role
2005	Sueños y Caramelos	Ashley Monraz	Supporting Role
2005	Piel de otoño	Liliana Mendoza	Co-protagonist
2002-03	Las vías del amor	Pamela Fernández	Supporting Role
