= Cuando me enamoro (TV series) =

Mexican telenovela

- Genre: Telenovela
- Created by: Caridad Bravo Adams
- Written by: Martha Carrillo; Cristina García; Denisse Pfeiffer
- Directed by: Karina Duprez; Lily Garza; Fernando Nesme
- Starring: Silvia Navarro; Juan Soler; Rocío Banquells; René Casados; Julieta Rosen
- Theme music composer: Descemer Bueno; Enrique Iglesias
- Opening theme: "Cuando me enamoro" performed by Enrique Iglesias and Juan Luis Guerra
- Country of origin: Mexico
- Original language: Spanish
- No. of episodes: 181

Production
- Executive producer: Carlos Moreno Laguillo
- Producer: Hilda Santaella Hernández
- Cinematography: Juan Carlos Frutos; Jesús Nájera Saro
- Running time: 41-44 minutes
- Production company: Televisa

Original release
- Network: Canal de las Estrellas
- Release: July 5, 2010 – March 13, 2011

Related
- La mentira (1952); La mentira (1965); Calúnia (1966); La mentira (1970); El amor nunca muere (1982); La mentira (1998); El juramento (2008); Coraçőes feridos (2012); Lo imperdonable (2015)

Cuando me enamoro (English: Timeless Love) is a Mexican telenovela produced by Carlos Moreno Laguillo for Televisa. It is based on the 1998 telenovela La mentira.

Silvia Navarro, Juan Soler, Rocío Banquells, René Casados and Julieta Rosen star in this telenovela.

Univision broadcast Cuando me enamoro from April 20, 2011, to January 6, 2012.

== Plot ==
Jerónimo (Juan Soler) casually meets Renata (Silvia Navarro) and is struck by her beauty from the first moment. Without knowing her true identity, a great love develops between them; one that will mark them for life. Fate and the intrigues of Josefina (Rocío Banquells) and Roberta (Jessica Coch) lead Jerónimo to mistakenly believe that Renata had a relationship with his half-brother, Rafael (Sebastián Zurita), and that the latter, feeling betrayed and used by her, committed suicide. For this reason, Jerónimo swears before Rafael's grave that his death will not go unpunished. Despite his deep love for Renata, he deceives her and decides to make her suffer so that she will pay for all the supposed pain she caused his brother. Throughout the story, Jerónimo finds the person who played with Rafael's feelings and discovers that the ones responsible for his brother's misfortune were Roberta and Josefina.

== Cast ==
=== Main ===
- Silvia Navarro as Renata Monterrubio Álvarez
- Juan Soler as Jerónimo Linares
- Rocío Banquells as Josefina "Fina" Álvarez
- René Casados as Gonzalo Monterrubio
- Julieta Rosen as Regina Soberón

=== Also main ===
- Guillermo Capetillo as Antonio Iriondo
- Alfredo Adame as Honorio Sánchez
- Lourdes Munguía as Constanza Monterrubio
- Lisardo as Agustín Dunant
- Jessica Coch as Roberta Monterrubio Álvarez
- José Ron as Matías Monterrubio
- Odiseo Bichir as Dr. Álvaro Nesme
- Aleida Núñez as Alfonsina Campos
- Grettell Valdéz as Matilde López
- Luis Gatica as Lázaro López
- Carlos de la Mota as Carlos Estrada
- Ferdinando Valencia as José María "Chema" Casillas
- Alejandro Ruiz as Ezequiel Fierro
- Yolanda Ventura as Karina Aguilar
- Wendy González as Adriana Beltrán #1
- Sebastián Zurita as Rafael Gutiérrez
- Irma Dorantes as Doña Catalina "Cata" Viuda de Soberón
- Olivia Bucio as Inés Fonseca
- Antonio Medellín as Isidro del Valle
- Sebastián Rulli as Roberto Gamba
- Lidia Ávila as Regina Soberón (Young)
- Margarita Magaña as Josefina "Pepa" Álvarez (Young)
- Silvia Manríquez as Catalina "Cata" Viuda de Soberón (Young)
- Juan Ángel Esparza as Isidro del Valle (Young)
- Jorge de Silva as Gonzalo Monterrubio (Young)
- Susana Diazayas as Inés Fonseca (Young)
- Mario Carballido as Honorio Sánchez (Young)
- Mariney Sendra as Constanza Monterrubio (Young)
- Araceli Rangel as Ágatha Beltrán (Young)
- Hugo Macías Macotela as Father Severino
- Jackie Garcia as Selene Carrasco
- Jesús Moré as Diego Lara
- Vanessa Mateo as Lorea
- Pablo Cruz as Daniel
- Yoselin Sánchez as Beth Arteaga
- Jorge Alberto Bolaños as Lawyer Ramiro Soto
- Raquel Morell as Ágatha Beltrán

=== Recurring and guest stars ===
- Octavio Acosta as Doctor
- Héctor Álvarez as Doctor
- Carlos Barragán as Waiter
- Al Castillo as Doctor
- Ricardo de León as Gustavo
- Florencia de Saracho as Adriana Beltrán #2
- Hope Díaz as Nora Collado
- Ivanna Díaz as Child Roberta
- Georgina Domínguez as Child Renata
- Aldo Fabila as Manriquez
- Fernanda Franco as Doña Sabina
- Aleyda Gallardo as La Ganza
- Geraldine Galván as Alisson Contreras
- Eleazar Gómez as Aníbal Cuevas
- Zoraida Gómez as Julieta Montiel
- Juan Luis Guerra as Himself
- Javier H. as Agent Pérez
- Logan H. as Ponchito
- Martín Hernández as TV Host
- Vicente Herrera as Lawyer Escandón
- Enrique Iglesias as Himself
- Benjamín Isas as Doctor
- Martha Julia as Marina Sepúlveda
- Magda Karina as Blanca Ocampo
- Wendy Lechuga as Host
- Linet as Employee
- Julio Mannino as Saúl Guardiola
- Ilithya Manzanilla as Arely
- Yolanda Mérida as Manuela
- Sara Monar as Gema de Ibarrola
- Marco Muñoz as Germán Ibarrola
- Milia Nader as Photographer
- Rafael Origel as Police Officer
- David Ostrosky as Benjamín Casillas
- Vania Pardo as Teacher
- Víctor Partida as Andrés
- Alondra Pavón as Nurse
- Arturo Peniche as Father Juan Cristóbal Gamboa
- Miguel Priego as Lawyer
- Michelle Ramaglia as Priscila
- Luis Reynoso as Leoncio Pérez
- Monika Rojas as Raquel
- Gerardo Santínez as Tomás
- Darwin Solano as Father Hipólito
- Sachi Tamashiro as Eulalia
- Sussan Taunton as Luciana Peniche
- Beatriz Tejada as Hospital Patient
- Laila Tornero as Almudena
- Andrés Torres Romo as Child Matías
- Marco Uriel as Commander Cantú
- Christian Vega as Andrés del Valle Fonseca
- Antonio Zamudio as Marco
- Rubén Zerecero as Post Office Guy
- Mario Zulayca as Humberto

== Awards and nominations ==
Year	Award	Category	Recipient	Result
2010	Oye! Awards	Theme Music for a Telenovela, Movie or TV Show	"Cuando me enamoro" by Enrique Iglesias and Juan Luis Guerra	Won
2010	TV Adicto Golden Awards	Best Female Villain	Rocío Banquells	Won
2011	TVyNovelas Awards	Best Telenovela	Carlos Moreno Laguillo	Nominated
2011	TVyNovelas Awards	Best Antagonist Actress	Rocío Banquells	Won
2011	TVyNovelas Awards	Best Co-lead Actress	Jessica Coch	Nominated
2011	TVyNovelas Awards	Best Co-lead Actor	René Casados	Nominated
2011	TVyNovelas Awards	Best Young Lead Actor	Eleazar Gómez	Nominated
2011	TVyNovelas Awards	Best Musical Theme	"Cuando me enamoro" by Enrique Iglesias and Juan Luis Guerra	Won
2011	People en Español Awards	Best Actress	Silvia Navarro	Nominated
2011	People en Español Awards	Best Actor	Juan Soler	Nominated
2011	People en Español Awards	Best Villain	Rocío Banquells	Nominated
2012	Latin ACE Awards	Best Character Actor	Hugo Macías Macotela	Won
2012	Juventud Awards	Best Telenovela Theme	"Cuando me enamoro" by Enrique Iglesias and Juan Luis Guerra	Nominated
