= O Fenômeno Rebelde =

- Genre: Variety show Musical
- Based on: Rebelde, by Cris Morena
- Presented by: Letícia Navas; Emílio Eric
- Starring: Isabella Fiorentino; Arlindo Grund; Arnaldo Saccomani
- Opening theme: Rebelde by RBD

Production
- Production location: Brazil
- Running time: 36 minutes
- Production company: Televisa

Original release
- Network: SBT
- Release: 30 August 2013

Related
- Rebelde

O Fenômeno Rebelde is a 2013 Brazilian television special. A special re-program of the Mexican soap opera Rebelde on the SBT, it was shown on 30 August 2013 in prime time on a Friday. The program had a presentation by Letícia Navas and Emílio Eric.

== Program ==
The show shows how the Mexican soap opera became a fever between the Brazilian public at the time of its airing. SBT has decided to re-show the soap opera in prime time due to various fan requests since mid-2012. During the week of SBT's special show on the soap opera re-premiere, it has had a big impact on social networks in general. On the day the show aired, the tags "OFenomenoREBELDEas21e15noSBT", "Mia e Miguel", "A Dulce", "RBD" and other topics that also had to do with the plot led the Twitter Trending Topics on Brazil. The subject still remained among the most commented the next day on the social network.

== Audience ==
The program scored 6.2 points with peaks of 8 audience according to previous IBOPE data in Greater São Paulo, leaving the SBT in the isolated vice-leadership.

=== Repercussion ===
The SBT has decided to re-release the telenovela in prime time due to the various fan requests since mid-2012. On the week of the SBT's special re-screening of the soap opera, it has generated a great impact on social networks in general. On the day the show aired, the tags "OFenomenoREBELDEas21e15noSBT", "Mia e Miguel", "A Dulce", "RBD" and other subjects that also had to do with the plot led the Twitter Trending Topics on Brazil. The subject still remained among the most commented the following day in the social network.
