= Grettell Valdez =

Mexican actress and former model

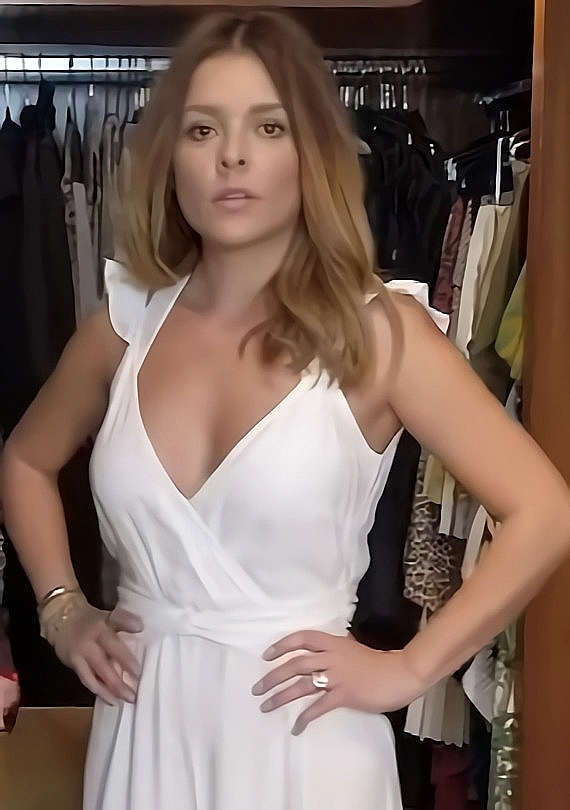
- Valdez in 2019
- Born: July 7, 1976 (age 50); Querétaro, Mexico
- Education: Centro de Educación Artística
- Occupations: Actress; former model
- Years active: 1997–present
- Spouse(s): Patricio Borghetti (2004–2011); Lionel Clerc (2018–2020)
- Children: 1

Grettell Valdez (Spanish pronunciation: [ˈɡɾetel βalˈdes]; born July 7, 1976) is a Mexican actress and former model.

== Biography ==
Born in Querétaro, Mexico, Valdéz's first acting role was in a telenovela called Sin ti between 1997 and 1998. In 1998 she made a special appearance in José Alberto Castro's telenovela Ángela as Eloisa. In 1999 she made a special appearance on Por tu amor as a younger version of Isaura Espinoza's character, Alejandra Avellán.

=== 2000s: Clase 406 and Ángel rebelde ===
In 2001 she again appeared in Mujer, casos de la vida real that starred Silvia Pinal. In 2002 she starred in series Clase 406 as Daniela alongside Aarón Díaz and Dulce María.

In 2004 she starred in a Venezuelan telenovela, Ángel rebelde as the protagonist alongside Victor Noriega and Maritza Rodriguez. She also had a supporting role in the Mexican teen series Rebelde as Renata Lizaldi.

In 2006, she co-starred in Roberto Hernández's telenovela, Heridas de amor as Pamela Altamirano. She made a comeback to telenovelas in Lola, érase una vez alongside Aarón Díaz and Eiza González.

She appeared in one of the episodes of Mujeres asesinas. In 2009, she was one of the antagonists in Rosy Ocampo's telenovela, Camaleones.

=== 2010s: Amorcito corazón and Lo que la vida me robó ===
In 2010, Carlos Moreno featured her in Cuando me enamoro as Matilde along with Silvia Navarro and Juan Soler. In 2011, she was one of the protagonists in Lucero Suarez's Amorcito corazón as Zoe Guerrero.

In July 2013, she was confirmed to star as the antagonist in Angelli Nesma's Lo que la vida me robó alongside Angelique Boyer, Sebastián Rulli, Luis Roberto Guzmán and Daniela Castro.

In April 2015, she was confirmed to star as the main antagonist in Salvador Mejia's Lo imperdonable as Virginia Prado-Castello alongside Ana Brenda Contreras, Iván Sánchez and Sergio Sendel.

== Personal life ==
Valdez married her Rebelde and Angel Rebelde co-star, actor and singer Patricio Borghetti, on July 10, 2004. At the start of 2008, she announced that they were expecting their first child. She gave birth to a son, Santino, on July 25, 2008. In October 2009, Borghetti confirmed that the two had separated and were getting a divorce, which was finalized in October 2011. She was later married to Lionel Clerc from 2018 to 2020.

== Filmography ==
=== Film ===
Year	Title	Role	Notes
2000	El duende del reloj	Iris	Short film
2001	Un mundo raro	Edecán	
2018	Sobre tus huellas	Eva	

=== Television ===
Year	Title	Role	Notes
1997	Sin ti	Unknown role	
1999	Infierno en el paraíso	Unknown role	
2002–2003	Clase 406	Daniela Jiménez Robles	Main role; 327 episodes
2004	Ángel rebelde	Lucía Valderrama Covarrubias	Main role; 214 episodes
2004–2006	Rebelde	Renata Lizaldi	Recurring role
2006	Heridas de amor	Pamela Altamirano Villamil	Recurring role
2007	Lola, érase una vez	Carlota Santo Domingo Torres-Oviedo	Main Antagonist; 225 episodes
2008	Alma de hierro	Melisa	
2008	Mujeres asesinas	Marcela González	Episode: "Sonia, desalmada"
2009	Verano de amor	Perla Gómez	Episode: "En fuga"
2009	Camaleones	Silvana	Recurring role; 45 episodes
2009	Tiempo final	Paula	Episode: "El funeral"
2010–2011	Cuando me enamoro	Matilde López	Recurring role; 163 episodes
2011–2012	Amorcito corazón	Zoe Guerrero de García de Alva	Main role; 205 episodes
2012	La clínica	María Carlota / La Vagabunda	
2013–2014	Lo que la vida me robó	María Zamudio	Main Antagonist; 137 episodes
2015	Lo imperdonable	Virginia Prado Castelo	Main Antagonist; 121 episodes
2016	Las amazonas	Casandra	Main role; 62 episodes
2018	Tenías que ser tú	Jeny Pineda Salgado	Main cast
2019–2020	Médicos	Dra. Ana Caballero	Main role
2021	Buscando a Frida	Gabriela Pons	Main role
2022	Amores que engañan	Sofi	Episode: "Solo una oportunidad"
2024	La historia de Juana	Jenny Bravo	Main cast; 65 episodes
