= Esperanza del corazón =

- Genre: Telenovela
- Screenplay by: Susan Crowley; Martha Oláiz
- Directed by: Rodrigo Hernández
- Creative director: Alejandro Reidman
- Starring: Lucía Méndez; Fernando Allende; Bianca Marroquín; Patricio Borghetti; Marisol del Olmo; Agustín Arana; Lisardo; Juan Carlos Barreto; Alejandra Ávalos; Mané de la Parra; Julissa; Carmen Aub; Tania Vázquez; Bárbara Torres; Laureano Brizuela; Alejandro Speitzer; Samadhi; Mariana Botas
- Opening theme: "Esperanza del corazón" by Bianca Marroquín
- Ending theme: "Esperanza del corazón" by Mané de la Parra
- Country of origin: Mexico
- Original language: Spanish
- No. of seasons: 1
- No. of episodes: 145

Production
- Executive producer: Luis de Llano Macedo
- Producers: Marco Flavio Cruz; Antonino Munguía
- Production locations: Mexico City, Mexico
- Editor: Jorge Agustín Arango
- Camera setup: Multi-camera
- Production company: Televisa

Original release
- Network: Canal de las Estrellas
- Release: 18 July 2011 – 3 February 2012

Esperanza del corazón (English title: Hoping Heart) is a Spanish-language Mexican telenovela produced by Luis de Llano Macedo for Televisa. It aired on Canal de las Estrellas from July 18, 2011 to February 3, 2012. It is a merger of Aguetas de Color de Rosa and Confidente de Secundaria, produced by Luis de Llano Macedo in 1994 and 1996, respectively.

Bianca Marroquín, Agustín Arana and Patricio Borghetti starred as protagonists, while Lucía Méndez, Lisardo and Carmen Aub starred as antagonists. Marisol del Olmo, Thelma Madrigal and Mané de la Parra starred as featured performances.

In the United States, Univision aired Esperanza del Corazón from September 6, 2011 to March 23, 2012.

== Plot ==
It is the story of Ángela, who supported by her daughter Lisa, struggle to move on and overcome all the adversities that life presents them. After the death of her husband Franco, Ángela suffers the abuse and batter of her mother-in-law, Lucrecia, who withdraws her support and kicks her out of the house.

However, Ángela remains enthusiastic, and she will face the difficulties with dignity and fortitude. When she married Franco, Ángela put aside her humble origins and her career as a ballet dancer in order to mingle with high-class people. In spite of this, she never lost her naturalness nor stopped fighting to keep her family together.

When Franco dies and she becomes a widow, Ángela is forced to move into a popular neighborhood, where she will live together with low-class people, some of them hopeless, to whom she will transmit the joy of life and the love for the dance. Here, she will meet Mariano, a gorgeous and handsome ecologist, who will end up captivating her. Mariano has a son, Alexis, who is the pop-star of the moment and with whom Lisa and Krista will fall in love.

Silvestre, Lucrecia's butler, lives in the La Esperanza development with his wife, Gladis, and their three children, Brandon, Abril, and Britni. The siblings have contrasting personalities and appearances. As the story progresses, previously undisclosed family secrets reveal connections between the siblings and the Dupris family.

All of these characters and their own stories contribute to a narrative, where the main ingredients are love, the conflict between good and evil, personal principles and finding the right way to defeat the villains. The story also incorporates elements of drama, humor and music.

== Cast ==
=== Main ===
- Lucía Méndez as Lucrecia Dávila Viuda de Duprís
- Fernando Allende as Orlando Duarte
- Bianca Marroquín as Ángela Landa de Duprís
- Patricio Borghetti as Mariano Duarte
- Marisol del Olmo as Lorenza Duprís Dávila de Cabral
- Agustín Arana as Franco Duprís Dávila
- Lisardo as Aldo Cabral
- Juan Carlos Barreto as Silvestre Figueroa
- Alejandra Ávalos as Gladys Guzmán
- Mané de la Parra as Alexis Duarte Moreno
- Julissa as Greta Lascuraín Rivadeneyra
- Carmen Aub as Krista Cabral Duprís
- Tania Vázquez as Camila Moreno
- Bárbara Torres as Bobbie
- Laureano Brizuela as Laureano
- Alejandro Speitzer as Diego Duprís Landa
- Samadhi as Abril Figueroa Duprís
- Mariana Botas as Britney Figueroa Guzmán

=== Recurring ===
- Jesús Zavala as Hugo Martínez "Wampi"
- Thelma Madrigal as Lisa Duprís Landa / Mónica
- Marco de Paula as Leonardo
- Fernanda Arozqueta as Alejandra
- Lilia Aragón as La Tocha
- Emmanuel Orenday as Brandon Figueroa Guzmán
- Gabriela Zamora as Rubí
- Karyme Hernández as Alma "Almita" Duprís Landa
- Rodrigo Llamas as El Muñe
- Sofía Castro as Eglantina
- Sussan Taunton as Karyme (Eglantina's mother)

=== Special guest stars ===
- Sandra Echeverría as Herself

== Awards ==
=== TVyNovelas Awards ===
Year	Category	Nominee	Result
2012	Best Male Antagonist	Lisardo	Nominated
2012	Best First Actor	Fernando Allende	Nominated
2012	Best First Actress	Lucía Méndez	Nominated
2012	Best Co-star Actress	Marisol del Olmo	Won
2012	Best Young Lead Actor	Alejandro Speitzer	Nominated
2012	Best Young Lead Actress	Thelma Madrigal	Nominated
2012	Best Male Revelation	Mané de la Parra	Nominated
2012	Best Female Revelation	Carmen Aub	Nominated

=== Bravo Awards ===
Year	Category	Nominee	Result
2012	Best Female Antagonist	Lucia Mendez	Won
