= Karla Cossío =

Mexican actress

- Born: Karla Alexandra Cossío; June 22, 1985 (age 41); Havana
- Occupation: Actress

Karla Cossío (Spanish pronunciation: [koˈsi.o]; born June 22, 1985, in Cuba) is a Mexican actress.

Born in Cuba and brought to Mexico when she was only three months old , Karla Cossío began performing very young. She studied acting at the age of 15 in the Centro de Educación Artística Infantil (CEAI) and later in the Centro de Educación Artística (CEA).

She attended elementary school in Colegio Ciudad de México, Junior High and the High School in El Colegio Britanico (The Edron Academy). She is also fluent three languages: Spanish, English, and French. Cossío was part of the soap opera Clase 406 with the character of Sandra Paola, a production of Pedro Damián.

In 2004, she acts in the soap opera Rebelde with the character of Pilar.

== Television roles ==
- Clase 406 (2002) - Sandra Paola Rodríguez Pineda
- Rebelde (2004) - Pilar Gandía
- Lola...Érase una vez (2007) - Paloma
- Alma de Hierro (2009) - Cinthya
- Como dice el dicho (2013) - Aurora
- Rebelde (2022) - Pilar Gandía
