= Fresa (slang) =

Mexican slang term

Fresa (Spanish: "strawberry") is a slang term in Mexico and some parts of Latin America to describe a cultural stereotype of a wealthy, superficial young person from an educated, upper-class family. The word was originally used by teenagers and young adults but its use has spread to all age groups.

Fresas are typically seen to be stand-offish and use a mixture of Spanish, and English or "Spanglish". They have a certain accent described as similar as if one had a potato in the mouth (la papa en la boca). The term fresa may be similar to the term preppy, which originated in the United States in the 1960s to define teenagers with a conservative mentality who were of upper social status. In Mexico during the 1970s, the meaning changed and became a term to describe the lifestyles of the youth who were wealthy and well-known.

However, the current usage of the term in Mexico has its origins in the late 1980s. During the rapid change in society as a result of globalization, which brought new forms of fashion, food and entertainment into the culture, a number of Mexican people began to adopt the "preppy" American lifestyle by mimicking American styles of dress, mannerisms and etiquette. Some examples include wearing polo shirts, boat shoes and chinos.

== Fresas slang and speech ==
The fresa (strawberry) sub-culture uses different words and speech patterns to be condescending to other people and using words like "Que oso" ("what a bear"), oso (from vergonzoso) meaning doing something embarrassing; or "made me feel like a bear" ("I was standing next to him, he did something embarrassing and I was standing there, feeling like a bear"). "¿Neta?" ("it is true?"), "chale" or "¡chaz!" when surprised; "zero" meaning "being nothing or no-one" as in "he is zero to me now"; and "X" meaning "means nothing, let's not worry about that now", "he is no-one in my life now" or "I don't have the answer right now, let's not talk about it anymore".

== Fictional characters in media ==
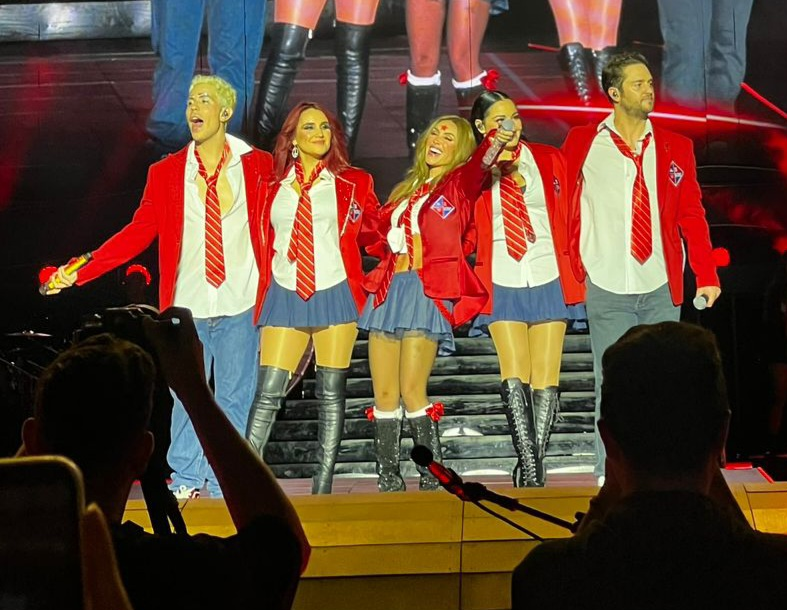
Latin pop group RBD, examples of fresa in the popular culture

- A well-known "fresa" is the fictional persona El Pirrurris, created by comedian Luis de Alba, a parody of the so-called juniors, the young and presumptuous children of Mexican politicians and entrepreneurs. Although this character is overacted and doesn't exactly match the real life fresa standards, he is often mentioned as a reference.
- Jose Emilio Pacheco, in his 1981 novel Battles in the Desert, exposes a series of characters that accurately represent diverse social Mexican subcultures from which we can have a more precise understanding of some social aspects in real-life interaction to comprehend how really several groups are.
- Julieta Ruiz Castañeda, from teen telenovela Soñadoras (1998), a teenager of lower middle class origins who often pretends to have high society origin, portrayed by Angélica Vale.
- Mía Colucci from the teen telenovela Rebelde (2004), a spoiled and self-centered teenager who is also loyal, attentive, and tender on the inside. She was portrayed by Anahí.
- Teodora Villavicencio from the Mexican animated films franchise Leyendas.

== See also ==
- Jewish American Princess
- Naco (slang)
- Old money
- Yuppie
- Strawberry generation
- Mazhory
