= Rodrigo Nehme =

Mexican actor (born 1982)

Rodrigo Nehme (born Rodrigo Vázquez Nehme; 22 August 1982 in Mexico City) is a Mexican actor known for his performance in the Mexican telenovela Rebelde as Nico Huber.

Rodrigo Nehme was born to a Mexican father, Jorge Vázquez Fernández Leal, and a Lebanese mother, Monica Nehme El Azar. He was brought up in Guadalajara along with his older sister, where he studied in the American School Foundation of Guadalajara (not to be confused with the American School Foundation in Mexico City). Later on he lived in Ensenada, Baja California, He then returned to Mexico City where he discovered his true passion, acting. He started modeling at 16 years old doing commercials for TV. During that time, he was asked to host the cooking section of a TV program, and then he studied at the "Centro de Educación Artística" (Artistic Education Center) in Mexico City. Nehme got his break by playing Nico, a Jewish teenager, in Rebelde, a highly successful Mexican series. He has also participated in several other programs produced by Televisa.

He is currently the CBO for Grupo Once .

== Filmography ==
- El Club (2002) TV series, Host, Televisa
- Rebelde (2004–06) TV series, Televisa
- Celebremos México: Hecho en México (2005) TV program, Host, Televisa
- Mujer, Casos de la Vida Real (2006) TV series, Televisa
- Che-k-T-esto (2006) TV series, Host, Televisa
- Cheetah Girls 2 (2006), TV movie, uncredited performer
- AMD (2006) TV series, Televisa
- Las Vecinas (2006) TV series, Jorvi Entertainment/USA
- Mujer, La Serie (2007) TV miniseries, Televisa
- Decisiones (2007) TV series, Telemundo/RTI
- Estilos (2007) TV program, RCN/Colombia
- Ugly Betty (2007) TV series, ABC/Televisa
- Maria de Todos Los Angeles (2008) TV series, Televisa
