= María Fernanda Malo =

Mexican actress

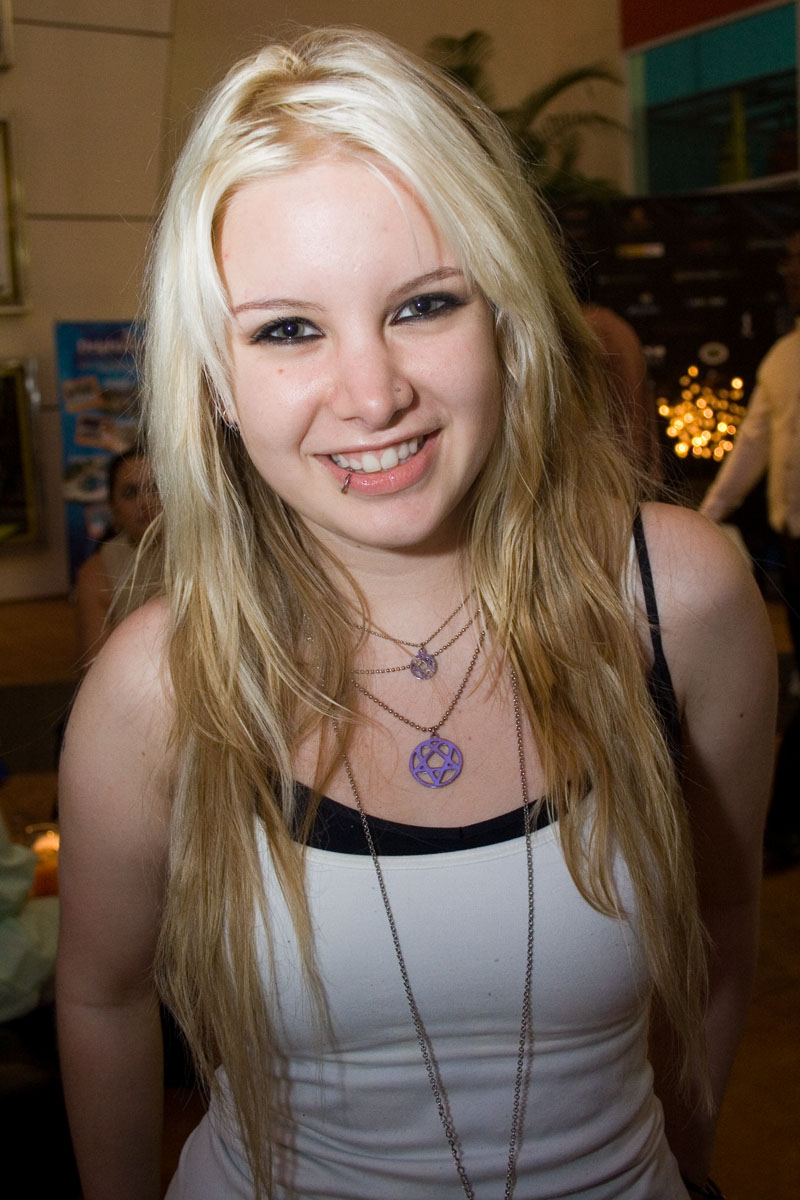
- María Fernanda Malo at the 2007 Cancún Film Festival
- Born: María Fernanda Malo; November 19, 1985 (age 39); Cancún, Quintana Roo, Mexico
- Other names: Fuzz
- Occupation(s): Actress, singer
- Years active: 1991–present

María Fernanda Malo (born November 19, 1985), also known as Fuzz, is a Mexican film and television actress, best known for her role in the telenovela Rebelde.

== Biography ==
Malo was born in Cancún, Quintana Roo, Mexico.

Malo later in 1989 moved to Mexico City, where she started her acting career.

Malo played many different roles on Mexican soap operas until 2005, when she was cast in a minor role in the film Efectos Secundarios (2006).

After the success of Efectos Secundarios', Malo was cast in a remake of Hasta el viento tiene miedo (2007), starring Martha Higareda.

== Filmography ==
- Como dice el dicho (2013).... Rebeca
- Miss XV (2012)
- Alma de Hierro (2008) .... Lore
- Hasta el viento tiene miedo (2007) .... Jessica
- Efectos Secundarios (2005) .... Jossie
- Rebelde (2004) TV Series .... Sol de la Riva (2005–2006)
- El Juego de la vida (2001) TV Series (as Marifer Malo) .... Marisol Robles
- La Casa en la Playa (2000) TV Series .... Tania
- La Culpa (1996) TV Series .... Lulú
- En Carne Propia (1991) TV Series .... Estefanía
