= Eleazar Gómez =

Mexican actor (born 1986)

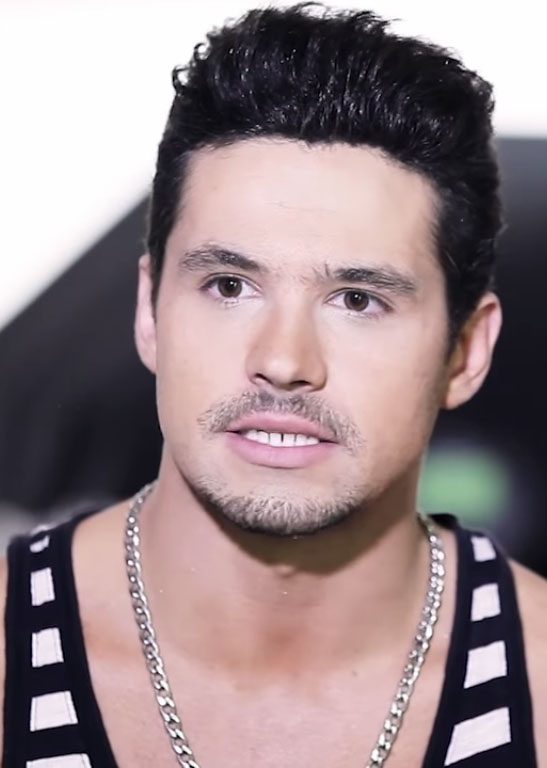
- Born: José Eleazar Gómez Sánchez; May 29, 1986 (age 39); Mexico City, Mexico
- Occupations: Actor; Singer

José Eleazar Gómez Sánchez (Spanish pronunciation: [eleˈasaɾ ˈɣomes]; better known as Eleazar Gómez born May 29, 1986, in Mexico City, Mexico) is a Mexican actor. He is noted for his performance in Mexican telenovelas. Gómez is the brother of actress Zoraida Gómez, Alizair Gomez and actor Jairo Gómez. He is a member of the Mexican pop band Eme 15.

== Personal life ==
On November 6, 2020, Gómez was arrested and accused of domestic violence. As a consequence of this arrest, he was dropped by his talent agency and his character in La mexicana y el güero was recast, with Ferdinando Valencia replacing him. Gómez was freed on March 26, 2021, after he pleaded guilty of domestic violence charges and was fined with 420,000 pesos and a three-year parole period.

== Filmography ==
=== Film roles ===
Year	Title	Roles	Notes
1993	Se equivoco la cigüeña	Pedrito	
1993	La última batalla	Mon	
2007	Species: The Awakening	Student #3	

=== Television roles ===
Year	Title	Roles	Notes
1995	Retrato de familia	Child Octavio Preciado Mariscal	
1996	Luz Clarita	El Chanclas	
1996	Azul	Lupito	
1997	Mi pequeña traviesa	Unknown role	
1997–2003	Mujer, casos de la vida real	Various roles	5 episodes
1999	Cuento de Navidad	Kevin	
2002	Así son ellas	Arturo Calderón Corso	
2002–2003	Clase 406	Brian	
2004	Rebelde	Leonardo Francisco Blanco	
2004	Inocente de ti	Víctor González	
2007	Lola, érase una vez	Adrián	
2008	Las tontas no van al cielo	Charly Morales	
2008	La rosa de Guadalupe	Sebastián	Episode: "Súper amigas"
2009	Atrévete a soñar	Mateo	
2011	Cuando me enamoro	Aníbal Cuevas	
2011	Momentos	Santiago	Television film
2012	Miss XV	Alejandro "Alexis" Reyes Méndez	
2012	Amores verdaderos	Rolando “Roy” Pavia	Series regular; 81 episodes
2014–2015	Muchacha italiana viene a casarse	Benito	Series regular; 169 episodes
2016	Simplemente María	Juan Pablo	Series regular; 59 episodes
2019	This Is Silvia Pinal	Young Emilio Azcárraga Milmo	Episode: "El derecho a elegir"
2019	Resistiré	Himself	Contestant; 11 episodes (5th eliminated)
2020	La mexicana y el güero	Sebastián de la Mora	Series regular, 102 episodes
