= Lola: Once Upon a Time =

- Lola, érase una vez
- Genre: Telenovela
- Created by: Cris Morena
- Written by: Iván Cuevas, María Eugenia Cervantes, Pedro Armando Rodríguez, Alejandra Romero
- Story by: Gabriel Fiore; Solange Keoleyan
- Directed by: Juan Carlos Muñoz; Luis Pardo
- Creative director: Alexis Covasevich
- Starring: Aarón Díaz; Eiza González
- Theme music composer: Carlos Lara, Pedro Damián
- Opening theme: "Si me besas" performed by Eiza González; "Masoquismo" performed by Eiza González
- Country of origin: Mexico
- Original language: Spanish
- No. of episodes: 224

Production
- Executive producer: Pedro Damián
- Producer: Luis Luisillo
- Cinematography: Daniel Ferrer; Vivian Sánchez Ross
- Editors: Noé Galindo, Julio Abreu, Juan Franco, Luis Horacio Valdés
- Production companies: Televisa; Cris Morena Group

Original release
- Network: Canal de las Estrellas; Canal 5
- Release: February 26, 2007 – January 11, 2008

Related
- Código postal; Amor sin maquillaje

Lola, érase una vez (English: Lola, Once Upon a Time), is a youth-targeted Mexican telenovela produced by Televisa that is remake of the Argentine global popularity and teen telenovela Floricienta. The show tells the story of a modern Cinderella, Lola, who works as a nanny and sings in a rock band and meets her so-called Prince Charming (Aaron Diaz). It debuted in Mexico on February 26, 2007, starring Aarón Díaz and Eiza González, and was produced by Pedro Damián.

== Plot ==
The modern fairy tale takes place in Mexico City and revolves around Lola, a poor but ambitious Mexican girl. Lola's life changes when she meets Alexander Von Ferdinand, the oldest son of a very rich German Mexican family whose parents died in an accident. Alexander is the head of the family and has five younger siblings (Marcos, Archibaldo, Marion, Boris & Otto) living with him in a huge mansion (Palace).

While Alexander is in a trip to Germany, he leaves his younger siblings at home with their nanny. The siblings throw a party, inviting Lola and her band to play. A bubble machine soon breaks and fills the house with bubbles. Suddenly, Alexander unexpectedly returns to his home in Mexico. The invited teenagers flee the party, including the band, but Lola goes back into the house to rescue the youngest sibling, Otto, who is only six years old. Lola is covered with foam, hiding her face. Otto is returned to his older siblings and Alexander asks Lola to stop, but she runs from the mansion leaving one of her "lucky" pink converse (glass slippers) behind.

Sometime later, Otto once again gets Lola in trouble by hiding in the back of her motorcycle. As an apology, Alexander offers Lola a job as an assistant nanny in the Von Ferdinand mansion. Alexander has a cold personality until he falls in love with Lola. Upon meeting her, he becomes her "Prince Charming". Alexander has a girlfriend, Carlota, whom he does not truly love and feels obligated to marry because of social status. Carlota at the same time does not truly love him, wants Alexander's money, cheats and deceives him. Along with Carlota comes her wicked & recent widowed mother, Monserrat, and her more pleasant sister, Rafaela. Alexander's siblings hate Carlota and her mother and are constantly doing mischief to get them out of the mansion and prevent Carlota from marrying their older brother.

Lola and Alexander are in middle love with each other, but Carlota and Monserrat try to get in the way of their relationship. Together these two also attempt to keep Lola from finding out she is really the stepdaughter of Monserrat and halfsister of Carlota and Rafaela, which means she has a claim to part of the Santo Domingo fortune. Lola, with help of the children, her rock band, magic, fairies and love attempt to "save" Alexander from Carlota and Monserrat and vice versa.

== Cast ==
=== Main ===
- Aarón Díaz as Alexander Von Ferdinand
- Eiza González as Dolores "Lola" Pescador Valente/Dolores "Lola" Santodomingo Valente
- Grettell Valdez as Carlota Santodomingo Torres-Oviedo/Carlota santodomingo de von ferdinand
- Lorena Herrera as Monserrat Torres-Oviedo de Santodomingo

=== Recurring ===
- Tiaré Scanda as Milagros Ramos
- Beatriz Moreno as Petra Sigrid Van Beethoven
- Zoraida Gómez as Rafaela Santodomingo Torres-Oviedo
- Natasha Dupeyrón as Marion Von Ferdinand
- Derrick James as Marcus Von Ferdinand
- Eddy Vilard as Archibaldo Von Ferdinand
- Juan Luis as Bóris Von Ferdinand
- Octavio Ocaña as Otto Von Ferdinand
- Viviana Ramos as Blanca
- Luis Gerardo Méndez as Bataca
- Juan Acosta as Facha
- Violeta Isfel as Gaby
- Carlos Guerra as Diego
- Victoria Díaz as Mercedes
- Ingrid Schwebel as Valentina
- Alejandro Peraza as Raúl Ramos
- Rubén Cerda as Antonino
- Alejandra Jurado as Cándida
- Felipe Nájera as Severo
- Alberto Agnesi as Patrick
- Alejandro Nones as Waldo López
- Roberto Assad as Chacho Ramos
- Alan Estrada as Nicolás
- Anneliese Asúnsolo as Matilde
- Blanca Sánchez as Nilda Santodomingo
- Juan Ríos as Eduardo

=== Special guest stars ===
- Christopher von Uckermann as Himself
- Maite Perroni as Herself / Cenicienta
- Enrique Rocha as Dios
- Xavi Moderatto as Himself
- Dulce María as Herself
- Anahí as Herself
- Brian Amadeus Moderatto as Himself
- Altair Jarabo as Catherine
- Alfonso Herrera as Himself
- Eleazar Gómez as Adrián
- Christian Chávez as Himself

== Awards and nominations ==
| Year | Premio | Category | Nominate | Result |
|---|---|---|---|---|
| 2008 | 26th TVyNovelas Awards | Best Female Revelation of the Year | Eiza González | Won |
| 2008 | 26th TVyNovelas Awards | Best Child Actor or Actress | Octavio Ocaña | Won |
| 2008 | Premios Bravo 2008 | Female Revolution | Eiza González | Won |

== Soundtrack ==
Lola, Erase Una Vez was the only Floricienta remake not to use the original songs penned by Cris Morena and Carlos Nilson. Instead, a double CD was released with songs written and composed by Mexican pop songwriters in one album and nine new Cris Morena-penned songs in another, along with a rock version of "Flores Amarilla" that was included in the original soundtrack.

The show's theme song is "Masoquismo" ("Masochism"). Other songs include "Si Me Besas" ("If You Kiss Me"), "Espiral" ("Spiral"), "Princesa" ("Princess"), and "Sapo Azul" ("Blue Frog"). In March 2009, González won New Artist/Revelation of the Year at the Premio Lo Nuestro Awards. González was nominated for Best New Artist at the Premios Oye!. Gonzalez also performed at the Premios Juventud in 2008.
