= Zoraida Gómez =

Mexican actress (born 1985)

- Born: Zoraida Virginia Gómez Sánchez; May 31, 1985 (age 41); Mexico City, Mexico
- Occupation: Actress
- Years active: 1996-present

Zoraida Virginia Gómez Sánchez (Spanish pronunciation: [soˈɾajða ˈɣomes]; born May 31, 1985, in Mexico City, Mexico) is a Mexican actress known for her performance in Rebelde.

== Biography ==
She is the sister of actors Eleazar Gómez, Alizair Gómez and Jairo Gómez. Eleazar and Zoraida Gómez acted together in the novel Rebelde (2004–2006). With only four years old appeared in an ad with Alejandra Guzmán.

== Music ==
While in Rebelde, she and two other costars formed the band Citrus or c3Q's, which only made one song called "No Me Importa" (I Don't Care). The band was formed to promote Herbal Essences shampoo (RBD's song "Liso y Sensual" was also used to promote the same name shampoo and Anahí was the brand spokesperson).

== Name ==
The name "Zoraida" originates from Don Quixote by Cervantes, where it is the name of a beautiful Moorish woman from Algiers who converts to Christianity and elopes with a Spanish officer.

== Men's magazine ==
In January 2011 appeared on the cover of magazine H Hombres Mexico, where, in addition to the publicity gained abandoned the image of teenagers who had.

== Filmography ==
=== Telenovelas ===
- La Mujer Del Vendaval (2012/13) Nuria Arevalo de Serratos
- Cuando Me Enamoro (2010) Julieta
- Llena de Amor (2010) Fedra Curiel (Young)
- Niña de mi Corazon (2010) Carolina Clavados
- En Nombre del Amor (2008) Liliana Martínez
- Lola...Érase una vez (2007) Rafaela Santo Domingo
- Rebelde (2004–2006) as Jose Lujan Landeros
- Enamorate (2003) as Darketa
- Aqua y Aceite (2002) as Mariana
- Azul (1996) as La Chamos

" Canaveral de Pasiones" (1996) Julia de nina

=== Series ===
- Como dice el dicho (2012) as Nicky

=== Films ===
- Mujeres Infieles (1995)
- La Orilla de la Tierra (1994)
