= Rebelde =

Mexican telenovela

- Genre: Telenovela; Comedy drama; Teen drama
- Created by: Pedro Damián
- Based on: Rebelde Way by Cris Morena
- Written by: Iván Cuevas; Pedro Rodríguez; María Balmorí
- Story by: Cris Morena
- Directed by: Luis Pardo; Juan Carlos Muñoz
- Creative director: Alexis Covasevich
- Starring: Enrique Rocha; Juan Ferrara; Ninel Conde; Patricio Borghetti; Leticia Perdigón; Anahí; Dulce María; Alfonso Herrera; Christopher von Uckermann; Estefanía Villarreal; Karla Cossío; Zoraida Gómez; Jack Duarte; Maite Perroni; Eddy Vilard; Angelique Boyer; Rodrigo Nehme; Christian Chávez; Grettell Valdez; Tony Dalton; Nailea Norvind; Diego Boneta; María Fernanda Malo; Allisson Lozano; Viviana Ramos; Rafael Inclán
- Music by: Gerardo Rosado; Alejandro de la Parra
- Opening theme: Season 1: "Rebelde" by RBD; "Malas Intenciones" by Erik Rubín; "Solo Quédate En Silencio" by RBD; "Sálvame" by RBD; "Plástico" by Natasha; Season 2: "Nuestro Amor" by RBD; "Aún hay algo" by RBD; Season 3: "Tras De Mí" by RBD; "Este corazón" by RBD; "No pares" by RBD; "México, México" by RBD
- Country of origin: Mexico
- Original language: Spanish
- No. of seasons: 3
- No. of episodes: 440

Production
- Executive producer: Pedro Damián
- Producer: Luis Luisillo
- Cinematography: Daniel Ferrer; Vivian Sánchez Ross
- Editors: Noé Galindo; Luis Horacio Valdés; Juan Franco; Julio Abreu
- Camera setup: Multi-camera
- Production companies: Televisa; Cris Morena Group

Original release
- Network: Canal de las Estrellas
- Release: 4 October 2004 – 2 June 2006

Related
- Rebelde (2022); RBD: La familia; O Fenômeno Rebelde (TV program)

Rebelde (English: Rebel) is a Mexican teen drama and comedy telenovela produced by Pedro Damián for Televisa. It originally aired on Canal de las Estrellas from October 4, 2004, to June 6, 2006, and on Univision in the U.S. from March 21, 2005, to December 15, 2006 replacing Corazones al límite (2004). The series is a remake of the 2002 Argentine telenovela Rebelde Way, created by Cris Morena.

Set at Elite Way School, an elite private boarding school on the outskirts of Mexico City, the series follows a group of students whose personal conflicts and ambitions lead them to form a band. The main cast includes Anahí, Dulce María, Alfonso Herrera, Christian Chávez, Christopher von Uckermann, and Maite Perroni in her breakthrough role, alongside Juan Ferrara, Ninel Conde, Enrique Rocha, Tony Dalton, Angelique Boyer, Estefanía Villarreal, Karla Cossío, Zoraida Gómez, Jack Duarte, and Eddy Vilard. Héctor Gómez and Lourdes Canale also appear in supporting roles.

A distinctive feature of the series is its frequent use of Spanglish words and fresa slang, particularly among its upper-class characters. The actors portraying the band members performed as the real-life group RBD, which recorded much of the show's music, including the theme song "Rebelde". RBD became one of the best-selling Latin music acts, with more than 15 million records sold worldwide. The series was followed by a sequel, also titled Rebelde, which aired for two seasons in 2022 on Netflix.

== Plot ==
The Elite Way School is a private boarding school with international prestige where high-class students receive a high level of education to be prepared for a great future. The school has a scholarship program for people with low financial resources who have an excellent academic level. However, few even graduate since they are persecuted by a secret society called "La Logia" ("The Lodge"), whose purpose is to conserve the purity of the privileged class. Among the students are Mía Colucci Cáceres (Anahí), Roberta Pardo Rey (Dulce María), Miguel Arango Cervera (Alfonso Herrera), Diego Bustamante (Christopher von Uckermann), Guadalupe "Lupita" Fernández (Maite Perroni) and Giovanni Méndez López (Christian Chávez). Six adolescents who, despite their differences, discover something that will unite them above all – their love for music.

== Cast ==
=== Starring ===
- Enrique Rocha as León Bustamante
- Juan Ferrara as Franco Colucci
- Ninel Conde as Alma Rey
- Patricio Borghetti as Enrique Madarriaga (seasons 1, 3)
- Leticia Perdigón as Mayra Fernández
- Anahí as Mía Colucci Cáceres
- Dulce María as Roberta Alejandra Pardo Rey
- Alfonso Herrera as Miguel Arango Cervera
- Christopher von Uckermann as Diego Bustamante
- Estefanía Villarreal as Celina Ferrer
- Karla Cossío as Pilar Gandía
- Zoraida Gómez as Jóse Luján Landeros/Jose Lujan Colucci Rey
- Jack Duarte as Tomás Goycolea
- Maite Perroni as Guadalupe "Lupita" Fernández
- Eddy Vilard as Teódoro "Téo" Ruiz Palacios
- Angelique Boyer as Victoria "Vico" Paz
- Rodrigo Nehme as Nicolás "Nico" Huber
- Christian Chávez as Giovanni Méndez López
- Michel Gurfi as Joaquín Mascaró (season 1)
- Grettell Valdez as Renata Lizaldi (season 1)
- Miguel Rodarte as Carlo Colucci (season 1)
- Tony Dalton as Gastón Diestro
- Héctor Gómez as Hilario Ortiz Tirado (season 1)
- Nailea Norvind as Marina Casares de Colucci (seasons 2–3)
- Derrick James as Santos Echagüe Robles / Santos Echague (seasons 2–3)
- Diego Boneta as Rocco Bezauri (seasons 2–3)
- María Fernanda Malo as Sol De La Riva (seasons 2–3)
- Antonio Sáenz as Iñaki (seasons 2–3)
- Allisson Lozano as Bianca Delight (seasons 2–3)
- Viviana Ramos as Dolores "Lola" Arregui (seasons 2–3)
- Ronald Duarte as Jack
- Rafael Inclán as Guillermo Arregui (season 2)
- Patsy as Inés (season 3)

=== Also starring ===
- Felipe Nájera as Pascual Gandía
- Pedro Weber "Chatanuga" as Pedro / Peter
- María Fernanda García as Alicia Salazar
- Manola Diez as Pepa
- Xochitl Vigil as Rosa Fernández
- Gabriela Bermúdez as Elena Cervera de Arango
- Alejandra Peniche as Damiana Mitre de Ferrer
- Lourdes Canale as Hilda Acosta / Profesora Hilda Bernard
- Dobrina Cristeva as Yolanda "Yoli" Huber
- Abraham Stavans as Joel Huber
- Jorge Zamora as Maurice
- Aitor Iturrioz as Esteban Nolasco
- Tiaré Scanda as Galia Dunoff de Gandía
- Roberto "Puck" Miranda as Cosme Méndez
- Patricia Martínez as Luisa López de Méndez
- Cynthia Coppelli as Mabel Bustamante
- Salvador Julián as Carlos Velásquez
- Liuba De Lasse as Catalina "Cata"
- Yessica Salazar as Valeria Olivier (season 1)
- Malillany Marin as Luz Viviana Olivier (season 1)
- Gerardo Klein as Fernando Ferrer (seasons 2–3)
- Lisardo as Martín Reverte / Octavio Reverte (seasons 2–3)
- Lourdes Reyes as Julia Lozano (seasons 2–3)
- Claudia Schmidt as Sabrina Guzmán (seasons 2–3)
- Alfonso Iturralde as Héctor Paz (seasons 2–3)
- Roxana Martínez as Milagrosa (season 3)
- Miguel Ángel Biaggio as Javier Alanis (season 3)

=== Recurring ===
- Eleazar Gómez as Leonardo Francisco Blanco (season 2)
- Florencia del Saracho as Romina (season 2)

=== Special guest stars ===
- La Quinta Estación as themselves
- Lenny Kravitz as himself
- Ricardo Montaner as himself
- Tiziano Ferro as himself
- José Ron as Enzo
- Hilary Duff as herself

== Awards and nominations ==
Year	Award	Category	Nominated	Result
2006	Premios TVyNovelas	Best Telenovela	Pedro Damián	Nominated
2006	Premios TVyNovelas	Best Lead Actress	Ninel Conde	Nominated
2006	Premios TVyNovelas	Best Lead Actor	Juan Ferrara	Nominated
2006	Premios TVyNovelas	Best Male Antagonist	Enrique Rocha	Nominated
2006	Premios TVyNovelas	Best Co-star Actress	Leticia Perdigón	Nominated
2006	Premios TVyNovelas	Best Co-star Actor	Rafael Inclán	Nominated
2006	Premios TVyNovelas	Best Young Lead Actress	Anahí	Nominated
2006	Premios TVyNovelas	Best Young Lead Actress	Dulce María	Won
2006	Premios TVyNovelas	Best Young Lead Actor	Alfonso Herrera	Nominated
2006	Premios TVyNovelas	Best Young Lead Actor	Christopher von Uckermann	Nominated
2006	Premios TVyNovelas	Best Musical Theme	"Rebelde" by RBD	Won
2006	Premios TVyNovelas	Best Direction	Luis Pardo, Juan Carlos Muñoz and Felipe Nájera	Nominated

== Elite Way School uniforms ==
=== Casual ===
Both girls and boys wear red sport jackets with matching ties, and long-sleeved white dress-shirts. Boys wear blue jeans and black dress-shoes with their jackets and shirts, while girls wear blue denim miniskirts and black knee-boots. Moreover, girls often untuck and tie up their white dress-shirts, exposing their midriff. Girls also wear regulation underwear: full-cut black briefs with matching sport-bras, as demonstrated by Mia in the series' pilot. In the last season, girls wear denim blue skirts with blue knee boots.

=== Alternate casual ===
In later seasons, some girls wear a different ensemble with their white dress-shirts: ochre plaid miniskirts and brown sport jackets, with black Mary Janes and white knee-socks.

=== Formal ===
Both girls and boys wear black sport jackets with matching ties, and long-sleeved blue dress-shirts. Boys wear black dress-slacks with matching dress-shoes, while girls wear dressy black miniskirts with matching knee-boots. Girls rarely tie up their formal dress-shirts.

== DVDs ==
Information
Rebelde: Primera Temporada (First Season)

Release date

- August 2005 (Mexico)
- December 2005 (Brazil)
- November 21, 2006 (United States)
  - (included with Celestial) (Wal-Mart Exclusive)
- January 9, 2007 (US)
Rebelde: Segunda Temporada (Second Season)

Released

- October 29, 2006 (Mexico)
- April 10, 2007 (United States)
Rebelde: Tercera Temporada (Third Season)

Release date

- June 30, 2007 (Mexico)
- July 10, 2008 (United States)
Rebelde: La Serie Completa (The Complete Series)

Release date

- November 13, 2007

== RBD ==
One of the topics that marked the success of the telenovela was the formation of a group named RBD (abbreviation for "ReBelDe"). The production of the series conceived the idea of the musical group to promote both the characters and the show itself. The project quickly surpassed the telenovela in success, so much so that it can now be considered as a separate concept (like Erreway from Rebelde Way in Argentina). The series served as a big promotion for the group because it reached all of Latin America, the United States, and several European nations. The group and the telenovela's Portuguese dub were highly successful in Brazil following their debuts in 2005, which prompted the producers to have the band re-record their first album in Portuguese. They would subsequently also re-record their second and third albums in the language. The show's success was so great that during the third season, the producers decided to lengthen the time of the episodes to one hour and a half, being the first telenovela with such duration.

== Main songs ==
- "Rebelde" performed by RBD.
- "Sólo Quédate En Silencio" performed by RBD.
- "Malas Intenciones" performed by Erik Rubín.
- "Plástico" performed by Natasha.
- "Sálvame" performed by RBD (Anahí in lead vocals with chorus singers).
- "Nuestro Amor" performed by RBD.
- "Aún hay algo" performed by RBD.
- "Tras De Mí" performed by RBD.
- "Este corazón" performed by RBD.
- "No pares" performed by RBD (solely by Dulce María).
- "México, México" performed by RBD (Only Anahí, Dulce María and Maite Perroni).
