= Patricio Borghetti =

Argentine actor and singer

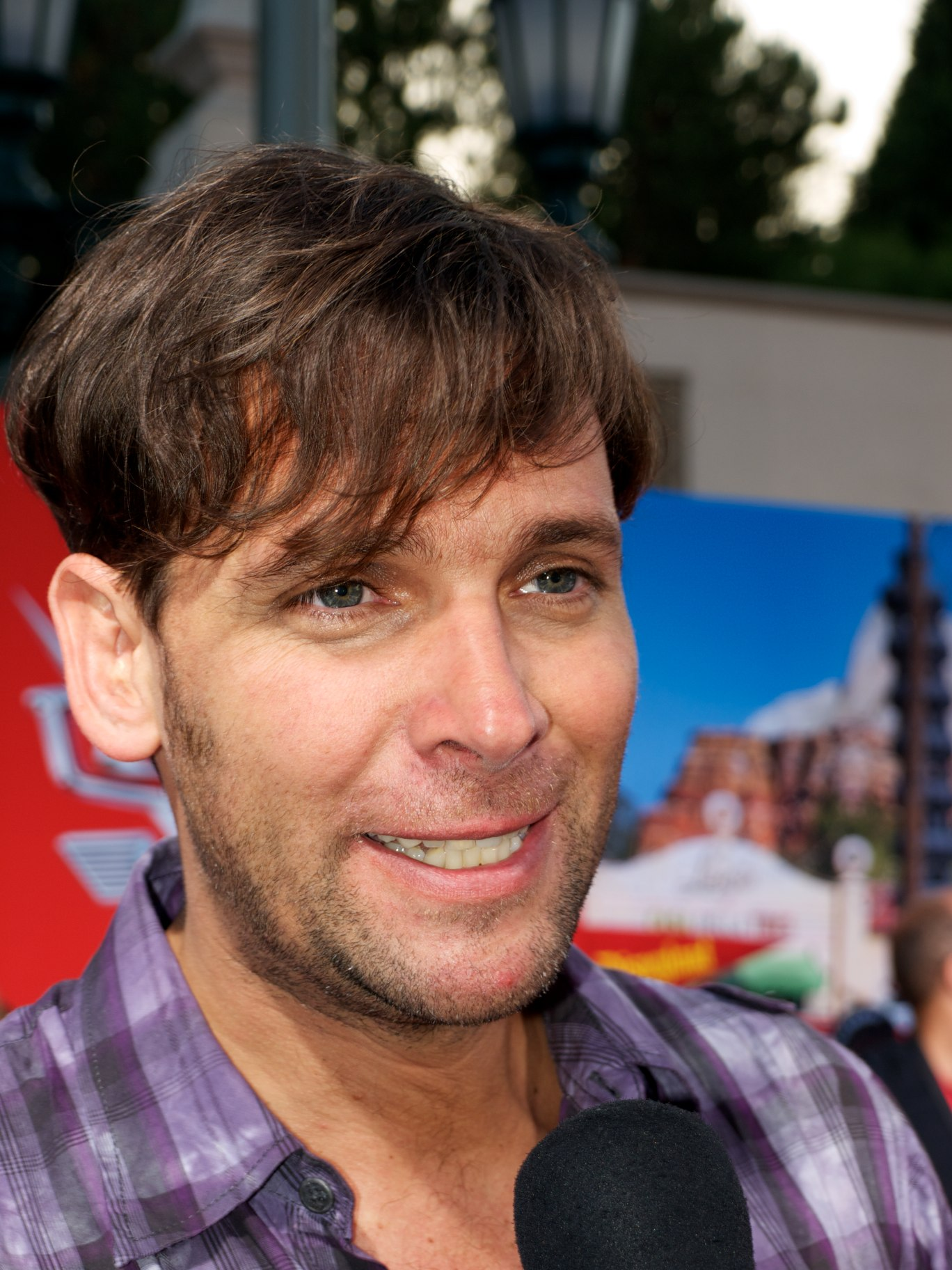
- Borghetti in 2012
- Born: Juan Patricio Borghetti Imérito; December 5, 1973 (age 52); Buenos Aires, Argentina
- Children: 3

Juan Patricio Borghetti Imérito (Spanish pronunciation: [ˈxwam paˈtɾisjo βoɾˈɣeti iˈmeɾito]; born December 5, 1973, in Buenos Aires) is an Argentine actor and singer.

== Life ==
At the age of fourteen, he formed his first rock band, which was called "Sur" ("South"). He later worked as a model and appeared in some episodes of Argentine telenovelas. In the mid 1990s, Borghetti arrived in Mexico, where he later starred in the musical telenovela DKDA, in which he played Axel Harris, his first stellar role. He has also participated in El Juego de la Vida and Rebelde. He participated in Atrevete a Soñar, and Esperanza del Corazón. He previously participated in Teresa (2010 Telenovela).
