= Esta historia me suena season 4 =

2021 Mexican television season

Esta historia me suena
- Season 4
- No. of episodes: 30

Release
- Original network: Las Estrellas
- Original release: 26 July – 3 September 2021

Season chronology
- ← Previous; Season 3 Next → Season 5

The fourth season of Esta historia me suena (shown onscreen as Esta historia me suena: Vol. 4) aired from 26 July 2021 to 3 September 2021 on Las Estrellas. The season is produced by Genoveva Martínez and Televisa. The season will consist of thirty one-hour episodes. The episodes are named after songs from the 1990s.

This is the first season not to be presented by the singer María José. The series theme song is now performed by the musical group JNS.

== Notable guest stars ==
- Scarlet Ortiz
- Pedro Sicard
- Raquel Bigorra
- Abraham Ramos
- Isaura Espinoza
- Lisset
- Wendy González
- Paty Díaz
- Alfredo Gatica
- Jorge Muñiz
- Sachi Tamashiro
- Alejandra Procuna
- Lisardo
- Eugenio Cobo
- Miguel Garza
- Christian de la Campa
- Anna Ciocchetti
- Alicia Machado
- Jorge Aravena
- Eugenia Cauduro
- Ariel López Padilla
- Daniela Aedo
- Sandra Itzel
- Tiaré Scanda
- Pablo Valentín
- Alejandra Bogue
- Omar Fierro
- Andrea Noli
- Raquel Olmedo
- Cecilia Gabriela
- Ricardo Franco
- Luis Bayardo
- Mar Contreras
- Gabriela Roel
- Gabriela Spanic
- Fran Meric

== Episodes ==
No. overall	No. in season	Title	Directed by	Written by	Original release date	MEX viewers (millions)
84	1	"Tiempos mejores"	Emmanuel Duprez	Kerím Martínez	26 July 2021 (Note: Premiered early online through Las Estrellas website on 22 July 2021.)	2.5
Olga is a television host who will have to rebuild her life after her neighbor, with whom her husband was unfaithful, murders her son and attempts on her life. Cast : Scarlet Ortiz as Olga Salgado, Pedro Sicard as Benjamín Landeros, Raquel Bigorra as Carmina, Gema Garoa as Farah Quintana, Abraham Ramos as Paolo Abad, Isaura Espinoza as Perla, Jesús Regis as Manuelito Landeros, Ana Carolina, Abril
85	2	"Que no quede huella"	Emmanuel Duprez	Carlos Pérez Ortega	27 July 2021	2.6
Nora, leader of the collective of women trackers of disappeared persons, is looking for her missing daughter that disappeared 24 years ago. She is contacted by Gloria, who says she is her lost daughter. Cast : Lisset as Nora, Wendy González as Gloria, Laura Luz, Ignacio Guadalupe, Ana Karina Guevara, Marcela Morett, Adriana Cardeña, Juan Verduzco as Judge, Moisés Peñaloza, Luna Sophia, Ricardo Vera, Adriana Tepale
86	3	"Pobre de ti"	Alejandro Ramírez	Carlos Pérez Ortega	28 July 2021	2.8
Julieta, leader of Las Gavilanas, is imprisoned for the accidental death of her stepfather. After being released, she will find that nothing is the same in her neighborhood and she just wants to get ahead. Cast : Paty Díaz as Sabina, Alfredo Gatica as Cuco, Alejandra Haydee as Lupe, Lupita Sandoval as La Diabla, Alejandra Herrera as Julieta, Esteban Franco as Gumaro, Melissa Galindo as La Cuija, Maryfer Santillán as Cecilia, Néstor Torres as Halcón, Karen Furlong, Paty Fernández de Castro, Libia Regalado as Doña Chole, Litzy Ruíz as Child Cecilia
87	4	"Sergio el bailador"	Alejandro Ramírez	Rodrigo Koelliker	29 July 2021	2.9
Sergio disappoints his wife Adela, first by getting drunk at his daughter Pita's party and later because he is found having sex with the neighbor Susanita, who only uses him to get money from him. Cast : Jorge Muñiz as Sergio & Father José, Zaide Silvia Gutiérrez as Adela, Wendy Braga as Susanita, Mariana Lodoza as Pita, Claudia Bollat as Martita, Valentina Escobedo, Vanessa Montemayor, Manolo Bonfiglio
88	5	"Besos de ceniza"	Alejandro Gamboa	Elizabeth Cruz	30 July 2021	2.7
Gina is reunited with Mariano 18 years after he left her while crossing the border. Pamela, Gina's daughter, seeks to separate them so that Mariano does not end her family, but she will discover a great secret. Cast : Ana Karina Sáenz, Mago Rodal, Salvador Espadas, Daney Mendoza, Daniela Garco, Gerardo Lizalde, Macarena Oz, Pablo Amador, Rocío Gallardo
89	6	"La de la mala suerte"	Alan Coton	Catalina Álvarez Watson	2 August 2021	2.7
Margarita falls in love with Manuel in jail and when he leaves, Margarita discovers that he is married, with two children, that he continues to steal and that everything she built with him has been a lie. Cast : Sachi Tamashiro as Margarita Pérez, Carmen Delgado, Raúl Coronado as Manuel Portela Domínguez, Priscila Lepe, Enrique de la Riva as Luis, Gerardo Santinez as Pedro, Daniela Montero as Teresa, Everardo Arzate as Raúl
90	7	"La Mentira"	Emmanuel Duprez	Gabriel Santos	3 August 2021	2.6
Eugenio dreams of becoming a professional footballer and his girlfriend Adela supports him unconditionally, but after a terrible car accident, Eugenio's knee is damaged for life. Cast : Erik Díaz as Eugenio, Roxana Puente, Alejandra Procuna, Alfredo Huereca, Crystel Gonca, Emmanuel Okaury, Luis Romano, Fernando Orozco, Georgina Olguín, Jorge Trejo, Matías Martí, Luciano Martí, Daniel García Parra
91	8	"Me dediqué a perderte"	Alejandro Gamboa	Catalina Álvarez Watson	4 August 2021	2.5
Ernesto is an oncologist who has put his profession first, neglecting his wife Alicia and their daughter Manu, who has Down Syndrome. Everything changes when Alicia discovers that she has cancer. Cast : Lisardo as Ernesto, Eugenio Cobo, Amaya Blas, Sebastián Moncayo, Edgar Alcocer, Manuela Duclaud, Miguel Garza
92	9	"El Espejo"	Emmanuel Duprez	Rodrigo Koelliker	5 August 2021	2.7
Victoria and Claudio, protagonists of soap operas, are separating, but when Melina, Victoria's maid, steals her work attention and her husband's love, she wants to end her. Cast : Fernanda López as Victoria, Christian de la Campa as Claudio, Fernanda Arozqueta as Melina, Gerardo Quiroz as Gabriel, Rubén Branco, Mariana Morones, Jorge Lemus, Mara Patricia Castañeda as herself, Miriam Calderón, Romina Graniewicz, Paola Real, Carlos Casiano as himself, Ricardo Escobar as himself, Juan Ríos de la Fuente
93	10	"Me he enamorado de un fan"	Rodrigo Koelliker	Elvin Rivera Ortega	6 August 2021	2.4
Lisa wants to be a famous singer, her aunt Astrid wants her to create gossip to make her fame. Lisa falls in love with Santiago, a fan, while receiving gossip and death threats. Cast : Anna Ciocchetti as Astrid, Renée Varsi as Lisa, Rebeca Fouilloux, Nuria Gil, Mía Martínez, Javier Manente, Rodrigo Brand as Santiago
94	11	"Adiós amor"	Alejandro Ramírez	Carlos Pérez Ortega	9 August 2021	2.8
Chenta is a singer who tells a reporter the true story of how she became famous after leaving her boyfriend, her mother, her alcoholic father, and an exploited manager. Cast : Rocío Reyna as Chenta, Ana Cristina Rubio, Moisés Peñaloza, Miguel Aguirre, Marco Franco, Ingrid Águila, Cher Constantine, Augusto Di Paolo, Alejandro Sánchez Ornelas
95	12	"La Lola"	Alejandro Gamboa	Gabriel Santos	10 August 2021	2.8
Diego flees, thanks to his mother, from a violent criminal who is his father and is left alone on the street, but Lola will rescue him and give him a new home. Cast : Ivonne Ley as Lola, Héctor Cruz Lara, Ricardo de Pascual, Toño Infante, Lalo Palacios, Arturo Posada, Naomi Hernández, Rodrigo Nuño, Ethan Mebarek, Alessio Valentini, Mime Faisal
96	13	"Cuando un hombre te enamora"	Alejandro Gamboa	Kerim Martínez	11 August 2021	2.7
Ana and Gilda discover that they are Saúl's girlfriends, whom they confront and with whom they break up with, exposing him to the public. He will take revenge by destroying their careers and making Gilda's niece fall in love with him. Cast : Nataly Umaña, Naile López, Benjamín López, Verito García, Oswaldo Zarate, Giovanna Utrilla, Julio Herrera, Juan Frase
97	14	"Suelta mi mano"	Alejandro Gamboa	Elvin Rivera Ortega	12 August 2021	2.6
Nora wants to go back to college and decides to divorce her husband, but after an accident, he will return home and she will be in charge of his agency, exposing fraud and other secrets. Cast : Alicia Machado as Nora, Jorge Aravena as Daniel, José Manuel Lechuga, María José Mariscal, Tadeo Bonavides, Diana Villa, Lautaro Ibars, Ximena Olivera, Maryen Jurado, Mar Ruiz, Mauricio Camps
98	15	"Por tu maldito amor"	Alan Coton	Gabriel Santos	13 August 2021	2.3
Jorge reveals to Alicia that he is in love with his best friend's daughter, who is 25 years younger. Alicia must restart her life and later decide on that of her still husband when he suffers an accident. Cast : Luis Miguel Lombana, Eugenia Cauduro Alicia, Ariel López Padilla, Viri Robles, Aleyda Gallardo, Daniela Aedo, Horacio Castelo
99	16	"Amanecí en tus brazos"	Alan Coton	Itzia Pintado	16 August 2021	2.5
Diana is kicked out from her apartment by her partner, so she asks her aunt Luisa for help. Luisa has a terminal heart disease, so she prepares her niece to take her place. Cast : Francisco de la O, Sandra Itzel as Diana, Roberto Miquel, Marcia Coutiño as Luisa, Saúl Hernández, Karla Vanessa, Rafa Pineda
100	17	"Corazones invencibles"	Rodrigo Koelliker	Carlos Pérez Ortega	17 August 2021	2.5
On the eve of the celebration of her XV years, Elena discovers that she has leukemia and nothing can be done for her, but she manages to fulfill her last dream. Cast : Tiaré Scanda as María, Pablo Valentín, Shaula Satinka as Elena, Angélica Lara Caballero, Eduardo Cáceres, Enrique Cueva, Claudia Acosta, Chuy Muñoz, María Fernanda Bernal del Corral, Romina Castro, Javier Yerandi, José Luis Huerta, Laura Sandoval, Enrique Logan, Luis Medina
101	18	"La calle de las sirenas"	Alejandro Gamboa	Paulina González Martínez	18 August 2021	2.8
Magda becomes pregnant and is kicked out from her house, so she goes to the city, where she has her son and becomes a prostitute. Years later, Julio falls in love with her with the intention of taking advantage of the boy. Cast : Alejandra Bogue, Andy Chávez de Moore as Magda, Fernando Robles, Mitzy Castro, Thelma Dorantes, Pablo Mendizábal, Tzátel, Lia Motta, Ian Monterrubio, Carlos Marmen, Enrique Logan, Jorge Pondal, Emilio Bravo, Luis Mateo, Paola Flores
102	19	"Limón y sal"	Alejandro Gamboa	Elvin Rivera Ortega	19 August 2021	2.7
Lorenza, owner of the restaurant 'Limón y sal', is upset because her competitor, 'La fonda de Tita', has just reopened its business and starts a war against Nacho, its owner, for the clientele. Cast : Omar Fierro as Nacho, Andrea Noli as Lorenza, Luisa Muriel, David Penagos, Maryel Abrego
103	20	"Enloquéceme"	Rodrigo Koelliker	Rodrigo Koelliker	20 August 2021	2.6
Paulina takes her best friend Víctor to a gay club on his birthday, where they meet Thiago, a dancer they both fall in love with, but who hides his true intentions and could end their friendship. Cast : Lalo Manzano, Dali, Luz Aldan as Paulina, Maxi, Jorge Losa as Thiago, Guadalupe Rammath, Rodrigo Zouvi, Jairo Zapata Escobar, Carlos Hernández Álvarez
104	21	"El Rey azul"	Rodrigo Koelliker	Tonantzin García	23 August 2021	2.6
Doménica and Andrés are two children who decide to run away from home. She because her mother wants to send her to a boarding school and he because after the death of his brother he was abandoned by his parents. Cast : Alberto Casanova, Evangelina Sosa, Raquel Olmedo, Erika Blenher, Sofía Galad, José María Nieto, Mariana Lambarri, José Miguel Ramos, Álex Otero, Job García
105	22	"Cobarde"	Alejandro Ramírez	Paulina González Martínez	24 August 2021	2.5
Daniel is despised by his father because of his sexual preferences, he, accustomed to luxury, decides to look for a woman to settle down and meets Mariana in a job that his friend gets him. Cast : Susana Giménez, Miranda Rinaldi, Dobrina Cristeva, Surya MacGregor, Alejandro Aragón, Fernando Garzafox, Luis Uribe, Yekaterina Kiev, Carlo Guerra, Jensen Ríos, Ingrid Águila, Guillermo Collard
106	23	"Me plantó"	Rodrigo Koelliker	Camila Villagrán	25 August 2021	2.7
Aníbal leaves Eva at the altar, a year later, she sees him with his new fiancée Gisela and wants revenge, although on the way she ends up falling in love with his best friend. Cast : Jocelyn Ibarra as Eva, Marcos Montero as Aníbal, Alix, Brisa Carrillo as Florencia, Mauricio Rousselon, Pamela Ruz, Padre José de Jesús Aguilar, Manuel Riguezza as Pablo, Ana Karina Sáenz as Jimena
107	24	"No prometas lo que no será"	Alan Coton	Itzia Pintado	26 August 2021	2.6
Gilberto asks Lucía for a divorce. She remarries and becomes a widow. Years later, Lucía is reunited with José, who promised to come back for her when she was 16 years old. Cast : Mayra Rojas, Constantino Costas, Marylin Uribe como Lucía, José Carlos Farrera como Gilberto, Lorena Enríquez, Emmanuel Morales, Edmundo Velarde, José Roberto Pisano, Santy Rojas, Rubí García, Mateo Camacho
108	25	"Lloran mis muñecas"	Alan Coton	Tonantzin García	27 August 2021	2.6
Lía looks for a job, since her alcoholic mother cannot find one. She is tricked by Marlon and his possessive girlfriend, he convinces her to pose in lingerie and records herself having sex with her. Cast : Olinka Velázquez, Miguel Islas, Perla Encinas, Kevin Holt, Jessica Rotaeche, Lesslie Apodaca, Melissa Dominique, Roberto Montes de Oca, Ángel Zozaya
109	26	"Pobre niña rica"	Alan Coton	Camila Villagrán	30 August 2021	2.6
Juan wants to get rich easily to impress the wealthy parents of his girlfriend Daniela and marry her, but everything gets out of hand when he finds his fortune in illicit businesses. Cast : Marcela Zalazar as Daniela, Sergio Reynoso as Mariano, Memo Dorantes, Paloma Jímenez as Viviana, Cecilia Gabriela, Erick Israel Consuelo as Juan, José Pardo
110	27	"El Diablo"	Emmanuel Duprez	Tonantzin García	31 August 2021	2.9
Cynthia will sink into the world of drugs when she meets a dealer after her mom stands her up at her 18th birthday party. Cast : Cinthia Aparicio, Ricardo Franco, Joshua Gutiérrez, Luis Bayardo, Mar Contreras as Diana, Steph Bumelcrownd, Jesús Betanzos
111	28	"La Cama"	Álex Ramírez	Catalina Álvarez Watson	1 September 2021	2.4
Teresa cannot get over the death of her husband and is about to separate her son from his fiancée, after she offers them the bed where Martin's father died as a wedding gift. Cast : Gabriela Roel, Karla Peniche, Jorge Melo, Boris Duflos, Lorena Bojorquez, Gerson Martínez, Natalia Solián
112	29	"Te aprovechas de mí"	Emmanuel Duprez	Carlos Pérez Ortega	2 September 2021	2.6
Margarita is admitted to a rehabilitation clinic where the director abuses her physically and psychologically in exchange for drugs. Cast : Rodrigo Murray as Damián, Gabriela Spanic as Rosario, Palmeira Cruz as Margarita, María Isabel Muñoz as Carmina, Bea Ranero as Isabela, Rafael Jorge Negrete, Alfredo Barrera, Jorge Alberto Bolaños, Marti Pandura, Manuel Rebolledo
113	30	"Todo todo todo"	Rodrigo Koelliker	Kerim Martínez	3 September 2021	2.7
Zaira, a dance teacher, loses her leg in a car accident and as she tries to adapt to her new life and save her marriage, she will strengthen herself as a woman. Cast : Fran Meric as Zaira, Mario Loria, Elaine Haro, Kelchie Arizmendi, Alejandro Peniche, Lucero Lander, Mayte Carranco, Cynthia Torash, María Islas, Patricio de Rodas, Carlos Velasco, Luis Medina
