= Esta historia me suena season 1 =

2019 Mexican television season

Esta historia me suena
- Season 1
- No. of episodes: 30

Release
- Original network: Las Estrellas
- Original release: 13 May – 28 June 2019

Season chronology
- Next → Season 2

The first season of Esta historia me suena (shown onscreen as Esta historia me suena: Vol. 1), a Mexican anthology drama television series created and developed by Televisa and broadcast on Las Estrellas it premiered on 13 May 2019 and ended on 28 June 2019, and the first season consists of thirty one-hour episodes. The entire season is available via streaming on Blim (now known as Blim TV).

Each episode of the first season is presented by the singer María José and the actor Jan Carlo Bautista.

== Notable guest stars ==
- Jorge Aravena
- Daniela Aedo
- Lilia Aragón
- Eugenia Cauduro
- Axel Muñiz
- Yankel Stevan
- Malillany Marín
- Harry Geithner
- Sandra Itzel
- Sabine Moussier
- Víctor Noriega
- Luciano Zacharski
- Maribel Fernández
- Fran Meric
- Ana Bertha Espín
- Nuria Bages
- Agustín Arana
- Tania Lizardo
- Amairani
- Luis Bayardo
- Cecilia Gabriela
- Adrián Di Monte
- Raquel Olmedo
- Lourdes Reyes
- Manuel "Flaco" Ibáñez
- Fabián Robles
- Diana Golden
- Alexis Ayala
- Aura Cristina Geithner
- Julio Mannino
- Andrea Lagunes
- Anna Ciocchetti
- Ivonne Montero
- Mar Contreras
- Luis Gatica
- Juan Ángel Esparza

== Episodes ==
No. overall	No. in season	Title	Directed by	Written by	Original release date	MEX viewers (millions)
1	1	"Adelante corazón"	Emmanuel Duprez	Gabriel Santos	13 May 2019 (Note: Premiered early online through Las Estrellas website and YouTube channel on 9 May 2019.)	2.5
Paulina defends Adela, who is being taken by force by a man, and hires her to be her son's music teacher, not knowing that her husband will be unfaithful with her. Cast : María José as Paulina, Jorge Aravena as Alfonso, Susana Rentería as Adela, Sebastián Moncayo as Jaime, Nahuel Escobar as Octavio, Daniela Aedo as Mireya, Diego Cooper as El Rufián, Leonardo Álvarez as Enrique
2	2	"Reggaetón Lento"	Alan Coton	Itzia Pintado	14 May 2019	2.6
Miguel does parkour to be a rescuer and in one of his trainings he sees Dulce through the window, a dancer who lives under the harshness of her old-fashioned grandmother and who discovers her passion in parkour. Cast : Lilia Aragón, Joss, Miguel Berdeja, Eugenia Cauduro, Juan Ángel Esparza as Hugo, Haydee Navarra, Axel Muñiz, Lisbi Cuellar, Allan Cardoso
3	3	"Yo No Sé Mañana"	Rodrigo Koelliker	Carlos Pérez Ortega	15 May 2019	2.3
Jeremías lives glued to the computer until one day he discovers that the end of the world is near and decides to make a "goodbye list" with the wishes that he will begin to fulfill with the girl of his dreams. Cast : Yankel Stevan as Jeremías, Alexa Archundia, Anahí Allué, Germán Gutiérrez, Mikel, Samuel Zarazúa, Gerardo Santinez, Diego Tello de Meneses
4	4	"Despacito"	Emmanuel Duprez	Kerim Martínez	16 May 2019	2.5
Aldo, a flirtatious and open teenager, seeks love in an older woman who is a sexologist and is also an insatiable lover that will take him to the limit of what he really wants, to fall in love slowly. Cast : Malillany Marín, Benny Emmanuel, Martha Mariana Castro, Sara Camacho, Adrián Herrera, Leonel Leyva
5	5	"17 años"	Luis Vélez	Gabriel Santos	17 May 2019	2.7
Jimena is a 17-year-old teenager who has maintained a secret relationship with a man 23 years older than her, with whom she has a son. She will be blackmailed so that she will not accuse him of pedophilia. Cast : Harry Geithner as Ramón, Sandra Itzel as Jimena, Isadora González, Santiago González, Rennee Varsi, Giuli Panvini, Ivan Nevelitchki
6	6	"Échame la Culpa"	Rodrigo Koelliker	Tonantzin García	20 May 2019	2.2
Martha and Abel are two teenagers interested in graffiti who meet at an art exhibition and for fear of rejection they conceal their true identity, which will cause problems when they go out together. Cast : Fernanda Tosky, Paco Luna, Rodrigo Brand, Beatriz Moreno, Martha Claudia Moreno, Leo Casta, Carlos Larrañaga, Daniel Flores
7	7	"Robarte un Beso"	Rodrigo Koelliker	Kerim Martínez	21 May 2019	2.1
Selva will face the cancer that will invade her body, in addition to the drug addiction of her son Lázaro. They do not have a good relationship, but he will learn to value his mother. Cast : Sabine Moussier as Selva, Víctor Noriega, Luciano Zacharski as Lázaro, Maribel Fernández, Roxana Puente, Eric Prats, Louis David Horne, Diego Louis
8	8	"Me Muero"	Emmanuel Duprez	Gabriel Santos	22 May 2019	2.4
Queta discovers that her mother has an extramarital relationship with her uncle and leaves the house with her boyfriend Mau, who is murdered, but his spirit is still present and Queta is the only one who sees him. Cast : Dayren Chávez as Queta, Eduardo Tanus as Mau, José Carlos Farrera, Olivia Collins, Fernando Lozano Llamas, Nicole de Saro, Marvin Sánchez, Adriana Deangelis, Leticia Amezcua
9	9	"3 a.m."	Rodrigo Koelliker	Kerim Martínez	23 May 2019	2.2
Toña decides to live with her boyfriend Pepe, but her mother and sister do not agree and make her distrust her partner, to the point that she thinks he is unfaithful and both will be separated by hazards of fate. Cast : Fran Meric, Fernanda López, Ana Bertha Espín, Miguel Arce, Emmanuel Cano
10	10	"Ya es muy tarde"	Rodrigo Koelliker	Tonantzin García	24 May 2019	2.4
Luna dreams of becoming independent from her grandmother, who cares a lot about her and separates her from David, a boy who convinces her to have sex, but Luna discovers that he only played with her. Cast : Nuria Bages, Daniela Basso, Gian Franco Apostolo, Yanet Sedano, Feliza Logo, Gary Centeno
11	11	"100 años"	Rodrigo Koelliker	Carlos Pérez Ortega	27 May 2019	N/A
Erika is a dancer who is pressured to have sex by William, her choreographer, but his former lover, Miranda, will not allow it, nor Erika's new friend, a boy who seems to be from another time. Cast : Isabel Muñoz, Norma Herrera, Sergio Madrigal, Diego de Tovar, Wendy Esparza, Roberto Tello, Jorge Aranda, Ana Granado, Marco Núñez
12	12	"El gran varón"	Jorge Senyal	Carlos Pérez Ortega	28 May 2019	N/A
Simón flees to the United States from bullying because he is homosexual and begins to transform into a woman, but when he is deported he causes a great impact on his parents when they sees him as a woman. Cast : Alejandro de Hoyos Parera as Simón / Simona, Sugey Abrego as Imelda, Luis Gatica as Andrés, Felipe Sánchez as Marc, Iván Ochoa as Fabián, Harding Junior, Enrique Logan, Raphael Cubas
13	13	"Perro Fiel"	Alejandro Ramírez	Elvin Rivera Ortega	29 May 2019	N/A
Paula is an attractive and manipulative teenager who hates men and plays with their feelings, almost to the point of causing suicide. Cast : Ivonne Garza, Iván Amozurrutia, Marcela Salazar, Agustín Arana, Sarah Reynoso
14	14	"Nada"	Emmanuel Duprez	Carlos Pérez Ortega	30 May 2019	N/A
Belém and Maximiliano begin a relationship, but she, because of her low self-esteem, believes that he constantly thinks about his ex-girlfriend and obsesses to the point of wanting to look like her physically. Cast : Gema Garoa, Tania Lizardo, Moisés Peñaloza, Melissa Lee, Amairani, Andrea Locord, Geo García, Luis Alexander Aranda
15	15	"Me haces tanto bien"	Luis Vélez	Gabriel Santos	31 May 2019	N/A
Andrea is a sick teenager in the care of her mother, who does not maintain contact with the outside due to her low defenses, but an accident will question her illness. Cast : Mayra Rojas, Julián Huergo, Yam Acevedo, Marco Uriel, Gerardo Murguía, Ara Saldívar as Jennifer
16	16	"Con los ojos cerrados"	Rodrigo Koelliker	Tonantzin García	3 June 2019	N/A
Paola falls in love with the janitor of the building where she lives, but he pretends to be the owner of the building and sees her in hiding for fear of her father. Cast : Lizy Martínez, Andrés B. Durán, Felipe Nájera as Luis, Luis Bayardo, Zeltzin Suárez, Melina Dionisiu, Jimena Fernanda, Paola Real
17	17	"Me soltaste"	Rodrigo Koelliker	Carlos Pérez Ortega	4 June 2019	N/A
Jeremías is a teenager with Attention Deficit Disorder who is in love with his neighbor, Violeta, who is diagnosed with Autism in her adolescence. Cast : Cecilia Gabriela, Mauricio Abad as Jeremías, Valeria Burgos as Violeta, José Manuel Lechuga, Alex Rosguer as Miguel, Stefania de Aranda, Isaura Espinoza, Naomy Romo, Ricardo Vera, Marcelo Barcelo as Young Jeremías, Barbie Casillas as Young Violeta, Yamil Yaber as Young Miguel
18	18	"Regálame"	Rodrigo Koelliker	Gabriel Santos	5 June 2019	N/A
Guillermo, a young ex-convict, arrives at his home after serving a 5-year sentence for leaving a bully paralyzed in defense of his girlfriend Betsa, whom he seeks to recover. Cast : Adrián Di Monte as Guillermo, Susana Jimenez, Raquel Olmedo, Miguel Ángel Loyo, Miranda Rinaldi, Israel Amescua, Santiago Beltrán Ulrich
19	19	"Cómo te voy a olvidar"	Jorge Senyal	Itzia Pintado	7 June 2019	N/A
Daniel and Daniela are first cousins whose families distanced themselves after watching them kiss when they were younger, but their grandmother's funeral will reunite them and continue their love story. Cast : Edna Alcocer, Lourdes Reyes, Norma Lazareno, Daniel Barona, Emmanuel Okaury, Karla Peniche, Ricardo Silva, Eduardo Minett, Dalexa, Ximena Teoo de Meneses, Ari Shasho
20	20	"Bajo el agua"	Alejandro Gamboa	Gabriel Santos	10 June 2019	N/A
Germán flees from his stepfather and stays at a dating house where Tifany, a teenager who El Patrón seeks to prostitute and is harassed by one of the guards, seeks to escape. Cast : Manuel "Flaco" Ibáñez, Fabián Robles, Marco Zapata, Isabel Yudice, Gizeht Galatea, Alejandra Haydee, Norman Elizondo, Ever Lenam Razo, María Sandoval, Adriana Tepale
21	21	"Pasos de cero"	Emmanuel Duprez	Elvin Rivera Ortega	11 June 2019	N/A
Fatima, a blind adolescent, has a forbidden love with an art teacher with whom she agrees to be only friends, while being harassed and sexually abused by her uncle. Cast : Regina Pavón as Fatima, Benjamín Rivero, Pamela Ruz, Dora Viridian, Carlos Marmen, Bruno Santamaria
22	22	"Todavía"	Jorge Senyal	Itzia Pintado	13 June 2019	N/A
Fabián, a 25-year-old, has been missing for 8 months and while it is clarified if he is dead or not, his girlfriend and best friend discover that they are in love with each other. Cast : Sofía Campomanes, Alejandro Valencia, Julio Vallado as Fabián, Sergio Corona, Aida Pierce, Diana Golden, Luis Uribe, Cinthia Vazquez
23	23	"Me niego"	Alan Coton	Tonantzin García	14 June 2019	N/A
Katy sends intimate photos to her boyfriend Lalo, but these are stolen by her ex-boyfriend, who sabotages the relationship and misuses the images, giving them to his uncle who works in a modeling agency. Cast : Carlos Speitzer as Ivan, Carlos Hendrick Huber as Lalo, Sofía Olea as Alexia, Lesslie Apocada as Katy, Aleyda Gallardo as Elena, Daniel Rascón, Roxana Saucedo
24	24	"A un minuto de ti"	Luis Vélez	Kerim Martínez	18 June 2019	N/A
Cassandra and her grandmother are famous for being protagonists of series and movies about vampires. This is how Germán arrives in Cassandra's life, a real vampire with whom she will discover true love. Cast : Guillermo Collard, Michelle Orozco, Victor Civeira, América Gabriel, Pepe Olivares, Carmen Vera, Victoria del Valle, Javier Yerandi
25	25	"Y tú te vas"	Carlos Ángel Guerra Villarreal	Tonantzin García	19 June 2019	N/A
Tania discovers that her dad has a lover and decides to stay silent to avoid divorce. Even so, her dad ends up leaving home and has an accident when he finds out that his lover is unfaithful to him. Cast : Alexis Ayala, Citlali Galindo, Jonathan Kuri, Fernanda Álvarez, Victor Hugo Arana, Karla Mora, César González
26	26	"Equivocada"	Emmanuel Duprez	Kerim Martínez	21 June 2019	N/A
Dana lives in a religious sect led by a manipulative man who finds out she is pregnant and when he orders a collective suicide, she begins to reflect. Cast : Aura Cristina Geithner as Lizeth, Omar Germenos, Xanthal Miller, Pamela Grauri, Cruz Rendel, Carlos Barragan, Naile López, Ignacio Guadalupe, María de Anda, Isabella Carrera
27	27	"Una Lady Como Tú"	Alejandro Ramírez	Alfredo Ballesteros	25 June 2019	N/A
Manuel is abused at work by his sister's boyfriend, but the appearance of Victoria, a beautiful photographer, will change his life completely. Cast : Julio Mannino, Lore Graniewicz, Michel López, Adriana Marroquín, Lucero Lander, Martín Muñoz, Angelique Montalvo
28	28	"Calma"	Alan Coton	Carlos Pérez Ortega	26 June 2019	N/A
Pedro gives a lesson of humility to his daughter Candela by taking her to live with her grandmother, canceling her credit cards and enrolling her in a public university, after living with luxuries. Cast : Memo Dorantes as Rafa, Andrea Lagunes as Marilú, Sury Sudai as Candela, Ana Silvia Garza, Arturo Posada as Pedro, Arturo Guizar
29	29	"Odio Amarte"	Emmanuel Duprez	Itzia Pintado	27 June 2019	N/A
Marcelita believes she is in love with her teacher and wants to lose her virginity with him, but with Guille, a boy with leukemia, she will discover her passion for science and love. Cast : Andrea Gio, Oddy Espinosa, Anna Ciocchetti, Denisse Echavarria, Alexis Beltran, Cristian Ferrari,
30	30	"Cruz de navajas"	Emmanuel Duprez	Carlos Pérez Ortega	28 June 2019	N/A
Mario celebrates two years of living with his girlfriend María, but falls in love with Aurea, a hired assassin hired by María's ex-boyfriend to kill him, but she falls in love with him too. Cast : Ivonne Montero, Mar Contreras, José Luis Badalt, Adrián Rubio, Ruben Cerda, Lilo Durazo, Franccesco, Tito Livio
