= Esta historia me suena season 3 =

2020 Mexican television season

Esta historia me suena
- Season 3
- No. of episodes: 38

Release
- Original network: Las Estrellas
- Original release: 5 August – 25 September 2020

Season chronology
- ← Previous; Season 2 Next → Season 4

The third season of Esta historia me suena (shown onscreen as Esta historia me suena: Vol. 3) aired from 5 August 2020 to 25 September 2020 on Las Estrellas. The season is produced by Genoveva Martínez and Televisa. The season consists of thirty-eight one-hour episodes, the first eight were originally produced for the second season. The entire season is available via streaming on Blim TV.

This is the final season to be presented by María José.

== Notable guest stars ==
- Erika Buenfil
- Sylvia Pasquel
- Isaura Espinoza
- Alfredo Gatica
- Ricardo Franco
- Alejandro Tommasi
- Mónica Sánchez Navarro
- Martha Julia
- Alejandro Ibarra
- Gloria Sierra
- Lisset
- Isaura Espinoza
- Eugenio Cobo
- Cecilia Gabriela
- Verónica Langer
- Queta Lavat
- Lisardo
- Diego de Erice
- Maribel Fernández
- Ramiro Fumazoni
- Raquel Olmedo
- Malillany Marín
- Marcelo Córdoba
- Anna Ciocchetti
- Lisette Morelos
- Cynthia Klitbo
- Alejandro Ávila

== Episodes ==
No. overall	No. in season	Title	Directed by	Written by	Original release date	MEX viewers (millions)
46	1	"Esta historia me suena"	Rodrigo Koelliker	Gabriel Santos	5 August 2020 (Note: Premiered early online through Las Estrellas website on 31 July 2020.)	3.0
Frankie is the heir to his father's architect office and on the anniversary of this, he asks Bibi to marry him, but his mother and his aunt, classist ladies, do not accept the relationship, since the girl is not of their socioeconomic level. Amanda threatens Frankie to take away all his inheritance if he marries Bibi, but this is not all they will do against Bibi. Cast : Erika Buenfil as Amanda, Sylvia Pasquel as Lucía, Estrella Solís as Bibi, Daniel Gama as Frankie, Jimena Fernanda as Lili, Moisés Suárez, Axel Arenas as Abel, Claudia Acosta, Nikole Barajas, Daniel Flores, Edgar Hidrogo
47	2	"Amigos no por favor"	Emmanuel Duprez	Elvin Rivera Ortega	6 August 2020	3.0
Rodrigo and the daughter of his maid, Fabiola, have a secret relationship, but when he fights with his father, he leaves for 7 years and will only return to the girl's life to harm her. Cast : José Carlos Rodríguez, Isaura Espinoza as Aurelia, Alfredo Gatica as Rodrigo, Roxana Puente as Fabiola, David Anguiano, Cynthia Aguet, Ian Monterubio
48	3	"Loco"	Alejandro Gamboa	Elvin Rivera Ortega	7 August 2020	2.6
Lucía, a woman with Bipolar Disorder, is determined to get her life and her daughters back, but her sister Laura tries to prevent this from happening in order to stay with her husband and daughters. Cast : Karla Farfán as Lucía, Ricardo Franco as Daniel, Esperanza Morett as Laura, Germán Valdés as Fabián, Alicia Encina, Regina Graniewicz as Paola, Ámbar Luz as Andrea
49	4	"Con todos menos conmigo"	Carlos Guerra Villarreal	Itzia Pintado	10 August 2020	3.1
Laura lives in fear of being reunited with her father as, years ago, he killed the father of her son in front of her, now she fears for the life of her new love. Cast : Alejandro Tommasi as Emilio, Jessica Díaz as Laura, Daniel Barona as Valentín, Deborah Ríos, Beto Ruelas, Franko Capdevila, Andrés Mora, Iker Mateo, Rafael Origel, Javier Ernez, Cheko Zaidman
50	5	"No es serio este cementerio"	Alan Coton	Pablo Zuack	11 August 2020	3.1
Ana wants to be an actress and together with José María and Nacho she prepares a show to honor the dead, but her mother Gloria does not agree with any of this due to her conservative beliefs. Cast : Eugenia Arriola as Ana, Carlos Hendrick as Raúl, Aurora Gil as Gloria, Hugo Albores, Bernardo Flores as José, Victor Varona, Ignacio Guadalupe as Evaristo, Fernanda Vizzuet as Lorena, Everardo Arzate as Carlos, Randi Juárez
51	6	"A partir de hoy"	Carlos Guerra Villarreal	Kerim Martínez	12 August 2020	2.8
Diego, a spiteful man, rebuses Elba in jail accusing her of theft and makes her husband doubt her when she gets her freedom. Diego will not stop his obsession until he sees her dead. Cast : Tomas Goros as Diego, Mónica Sánchez Navarro, Marcela Ruíz Esparza as Elba, Gerardo Acuña as Emilio, Tamara Guzmán as Nene, Tamara Henaine, Patricia Guilliem, Leonardo Herrera,
52	7	"Me cuesta tanto olvidarte"	Alejandro Ramírez	Itza Pintado	13 August 2020	2.9
Carmencita has the illusion of reuniting her parents for her quinceañera party, a task that seems increasingly impossible. Cast : Gabriela Zamora as Julia, Juan Ángel Esparza as Dario, Hector Kotsifakis as Omar, Juliana Bao as Carmen, Loreli, Ana Celeste, Saúl Hernández, Celia Marcué
53	8	"Castillos"	Alejandro Ramírez	Kerim Martínez	14 August 2020	2.6
Ángeles feels abandoned by her husband Víctor and after deciding to abandon him and take a self-knowledge course, she meets Carlos's love and discovers her husband's infidelity with her best friend. Cast : Martha Julia as Ángeles, Alberto Pavón as Víctor, Diana Villa, Marcos Montero as Carlos, Lorena Bojorquez, Ricardo Selmen as Santiago, Tadeo Bonavides as
54	9	"Amiga mía"	Alejandro Gamboa	Kerim Martínez	17 August 2020	2.8
Amalia and Alejandro are friends, they live together and raised Martín, the son of their best friend Darío, who is about to get out of jail to get Martín back. Cast : Alejandro Ibarra as Kuno, Marcela Salazar as Amalia, Chris Pazcal as Dario, Dari Romo as Laura, Jerry Velázquez as Alejandro, Mateo Camacho as Martín
55	10	"El reloj Cucú"	Emmanuel Duprez	Gabriel Santos	18 August 2020	2.5
Rogelio finds the old cuckoo clock from his childhood and shares the memories of how it made him overcome his fear of the dark and how he met his wife. Cast : Gloria Sierra as Camila, Bea Ranero as Alexa, Dacia González, Ian Monterrubio as Child Rogelio, Fernando Estrada as Adult Rogelio, David Negrete as Raúl, Caribe Álvarez, Ximena Valenzuela, Emiliano Chincoya as Bruno, Gerardo Cortés as Armando, Gabriela Estrada, Ada Dorantes, Pamela Vargas
56	11	"Corre"	Emmanuel Duprez	Catalina Álvarez Watson	19 August 2020	3.0
Karina feels that her husband no longer loves her, that he does not value her effort and the sacrifice she has made for her family, since he only dedicates himself to controlling her through money. Cast : Lisset as Karina, Jean Paul Leroux as Rodrigo, Mónica Sánchez Navarro, Cynthia Alesco as Cristina, Carmen Sarahí, Elizabeth Valdez, Camila Acosta, Yamil Yaber, Christian Izaguirre, Rogelio González, Cecilia Constantino, Sara Monar, Gabriela Carrión
57	12	"Como quien pierde la estrella"	Rodrigo Koelliker	Kerim Martínez	20 August 2020	2.7
In times of uncertainty, Catalina is the link for families who want to communicate with their sick loved ones. Cast : Marilyn Uribe as Catalina, Claudio Lafarga as Esteban, José Carlos Rodríguez as Don Ignacio, Isaura Espinoza as Dr. Salazar, Karolina Gutzce, Angélica Nieto, Daniela Ortíz Rentería, JC Lozano, Carlos Feliciano, Ivonne Herrera
58	13	"Ni tú ni nadie"	Rodrigo Koelliker	Paulina González Martínez	21 August 2020	3.0
Arturo is cared for by his daughter Diana, who leaves everything to take care of him. When Luciano gets in touch with Diana, she discovers that her father is gay and fights for him to finally be free and happy. Cast : Eugenio Cobo as Arturo, Jessica Mas as Diana, Cecilia Gabriela, Alejandro Aragón as Luciano, Alfredo Huereca as Josué, Lorena Álvarez, Juan Carlos Freyre as Young Arturo, Sergio Esquer as Roberto, Axel Contreras, Mario de Jesús
59	14	"Que lloro"	Luis Vélez	Rodrigo Koelliker	24 August 2020	2.7
Carmela, before dying in the hospital, makes her daughter Lorena promise to look for René. Remedios, Carmela's best friend, tells Lorena that her sister was kidnapped when she was born. Lorena hires a private investigator and days later is assassinated. Cast : Verónica Langer as Lorena, Norma Lazareno as Remedios, Alfonso Iturralde, Ricky Beck as Pedro, Valeria Leyva as Ana María, Queta Lavat, Fernanda Rivas, María Fernada Zepeda, Xochiquetzal Martínez, Mayra Araiza, Carlos Hernández, Andreas Pears as Guzman, Arturo Sarabia, Carlos Pedro Flores, Angélica Lara, Erasmo Ríos
60	15	"Tú lo decidiste"	Emmanuel Duprez	Gabriel Santos	25 August 2020	2.6
Rocío ends her engagement with her fiancé Javier, who upon learning that Rocío is going to take care of her niece Luz María who has just been diagnosed with paranoid schizophrenia, decides to abandon her, due to her insecurities and fears sown by her sister Juana. Cast : Astrid Hernández as Rocío, Hugo Aceves as Javier, Paloma Jiménez as Beatriz, Ana Tena as Luz María, Perla Corona, Patricia Martínez as Chona, Nubia Martí, Tania Riquenes, Sofía Monroy
61	16	"Devuélveme a mi chica"	Emmanuel Duprez	Carlos Pérez Ortega	26 August 2020	2.6
Perla leaves home and abandons her mother to go with Sergio, a dangerous criminal with whom she falls in love with. Cast : Martha Cristiana as Marisela, Giovana Cadena as Perla, Alessandro Jaimes as Sergio, Víctor Hugo Arana, Ever Leman Razo, Patricia Rojas, Danel Maya, Veticeyva
62	17	"¿Cómo pudiste hacerme esto a mí?"	Alan Coton	Itzia Pintado	27 August 2020	2.8
Paula finds out that her father was run over and everything seems to indicate that it was her mother, but she becomes her lawyer and will bring out the truth about the real culprit. Cast : Marcela Girón as Paula Juarroz, José Carlos Farrera as Gustavo, Viri Robles as Galina, Francisco Avendaño as Carlos Juarroz, Sharon Gaytán, Franko Capoevila, Deborah Ríos, Uriel García, Xavier Cervantes, Alfonso Gálvez, Blanca Ferreyra, Roberto Mañón, Francisco Javier Chapa
63	18	"A puro dolor"	Rodrigo Koelliker	Elvin Rivera Ortega	28 August 2020	2.5
Eduardo and Antonia team up against Raymundo, her pimp, to put him behind bars so that she can be happy with her daughter. The problem is that Eduardo has fallen in love with her. Cast : Lisardo as Raymundo, Ligia Uriarte as Antonia, Diego de Erice as Eduardo, Maribel Fernández as Carmen, Paola Real as Daniela, Roberto Tello, Diana Jiménez, Adolfo del Puente, Ricardo Valdivia, Gilberto Miranda, Jesús Sánchez Barrios
64	19	"Sería más facil"	Alan Coton	Catalina Álvarez Watson	31 August 2020	2.6
Ana and Carlos celebrate their second nuptials, during the 20th wedding anniversary, an event that makes Ana doubt whether or not to go ahead with her marriage for which she has postponed her dreams. Cast : Ivonne Ley as Ana, José Manuel Lechuga as Carlos, Emmanuel Morales as Tomás, Mildred Motta, Miguel Revelo, Michell Durán, José Alfaro, Ricardo Barona, Mauricio Durán, Teresa García
65	20	"Yo no te pido la luna"	Rodrigo Koelliker	Elvin Rivera Ortega	1 September 2020	2.4
Valentina is a 30-year-old woman who has decided not to marry, despite pressure from her sister, and maintains a private relationship with her colleague Dr. Daniel, who does not know that he is married. Cast : Sugey Ábrego as Carola, Ramiro Fumazoni as Dr. Daniel, Raquel Olmedo, Jessica Decote as Valentina Quiroz, Erika Blenher, Carlos Gatica as Fabián, Diana Paulina as Erendida, Diana Darcy as Sofía
66	21	"Por amarte así"	Luis Vélez	Rodrigo Koelliker	2 September 2020	2.7
Gaby is reunited with her ex-boyfriend without knowing that now he is her new client. Both are married, but the flame of love resurfaces between them and they think about divorce to be happy. Cast : Ricardo Franco as Daniel, Paulina de Labra as Gaby, José Luis Cordero, Yam Acevedo, Ramsés Alemán as Damián, Alejandra Escalante, Ana Monjarrás, Marina Vera, José Jaime Orozco, Agustín López Lezama, Lorenzo Constantino, Julia Margaleff
67	22	"Un buen perdedor"	Luis Vélez	Tonantzin García	3 September 2020	2.8
Jessica vows to wait for Daniel until he returns from the United States, but years later she meets Óscar, whom she marries. Óscar decides to leave her when Jessica is reunited with Daniel. Cast : Kelchie Arizmendi as Mónica, Francisco Pizaña as Oscar, Karyme Hernández as Jessica, Karla Rico, Paulina de Alba, Ángel Noé as Daniel, Olga Consuelo, Luis Mateo Negrete
68	23	"Amores extraños"	Alan Coton	Tonantzin García	4 September 2020	2.6
Brenda falls in love with the secret admirer who writes her love letters. However, Matías will pretend to be the author to win her over. Cast : Lesslie Apodaca, Francisca Lozano as Brenda, Jazz Orea, Milleth Gómez, Roberto Marín as Matías, Tomás Rojas, Alejandro Porter as Erick, Moisés Araiza, Tony Ochoa
69	24	"La puerta del colegio"	Alan Coton	Carlos Pérez Ortega	7 September 2020	2.8
Vicky gets pregnant by Alan, both decide to escape to live together, but he never arrives and Vicky gives birth to a baby with Down syndrome, her parents send her to study at a convent. Years later Vicky becomes the director of a school for nuns, where she will help her students. Cast : Lorena Enríquez as Vicky, Salma Alexa as Young Vicky, Emilio Caballero as Alan, Benjamín Martínez, Mar Dávila, Vanessa Díaz, Ricardo Selmen, Valeria Almada, Iker García, Valentina Zertuche, Celia Marcué, Gabie Lazcano, Guadalupe Rammath, Naomi Quintana, Juan Carlos Franzoni, Roberto Almada, Elsa Marín
70	25	"Bella señora"	Emmanuel Duprez	Kerím Martínez	8 September 2020	2.8
Teresa accompanies her friend Nina to a location and inadvertently becomes the substitute for a model. Teresa manages to captivate the actor René and he decides to win her over, without imagining that she has a son and that she is a kindergarten teacher. Cast : Malillany Marín as Teresa, Axel Alcántara as René, Azalia Ortíz as Nina, Frida Astrid, Aída del Río, Irving Copla, Michell Vega, Norma Criss, Verónica Muñoz
71	26	"La puerta negra"	Alan Coton	Camila Villagrán	9 September 2020	2.9
Karina and Max are dating and she wants to introduce him to her parents, but Eduardo, Karina's father, discovers that Max is his lover's son, so he will do everything to separate them. Cast : Marcelo Córdoba as Eduardo, Ximena Falcón as Karina, Susana Dizayas, Briggitte Beltrán, Héctor Muñoz as Max, Laura Sotelo, Matías Salazar, Alma Rosa Añorve
72	27	"Que nadie sepa mi sufrir"	Emmanuel Duprez	Carlos Pérez Ortega	10 September 2020	3.0
Helena Ruvalcaba, a federal judge who is taking the case against the leader of a criminal group, begins an affair with her new driver that will defy all laws. Cast : Laura Ferretti as Helena, Alan Calcino as Narciso, Carlos Corona as Refugio, Fernanda Tosky, Anayn Cobian, Araceli Adame, Dennys Vindel, Norma Criss, Montserrat Castillo, Luis Loria, Clarisa Rendon
73	28	"Mi historia entre tus dedos"	Rodrigo Koelliker	Tonantzin García	11 September 2020	2.8
Gloria dreams of studying her master's degree in London. Fer and Julián dispute her love, the latter steals his song and Fer suffers an accident while defending Gloria's grandfather. Cast : Anna Ciocchetti as Catalina, Edi Pequivel as Fer, Adriana Cardeña, Clarisa González, Alejandro Peniche, Hugo Macías Macotela as Don Manuel, Sergio Madrigal as Julián, Valeria Burgos as Gloria, Orlando Muñoz, Chuy Muñoz
74	29	"Si yo fuera mujer"	Rodrigo Koelliker	Itzia Pintado	14 September 2020	2.9
Andrea has a birthday wish to meet her father again. Upon searching for him, she discovers that he has HIV and asks for his help in saving her mother and stepsisters from her aggressive stepfather. Cast : Anna Ciocchetti as Patricio, Naomy Romo, Eugenia Arriola as Andrea, León Michel as Jaime, Ireri Solis, Natasha Cubría, Allisson Coronado, Pilar Castillo, Rocío Canseco, Ahtziri Tapia, Ilse Estrada, Rafael Origel
75	30	"Tres veces te engañe"	Alejandro Gamboa	Gabriel Santos	15 September 2020	2.8
Lucía discovers that her almost perfect marriage is a lie, because her husband has another family. She decides to cheat on her husband three times and on the way discovers how to reinvent herself. Cast : Lisette Morelos as Lucía, Lupita Lara, Jorge Lan as Domingo, Benjamín Rivero, Paulina Gil as Xiomara, Carlo Cuadra as Gustavo, Daniel Bretón, Rodrigo René
76	31	"La negra Tomasa"	Alejandro Gamboa	Carlos Pérez Ortega	16 September 2020	2.8
Tomasa is a Cuban sprinter who goes to Mexico with her coach, with the secret intentions of becoming a model, a dream she achieves when she also finds love. Cast : Cynthia Klitbo, Sahit Sosa as José Ignacio, Salvador Sánchez as Jeremías, Abi Gómez as Tomasa, Iván Bronstein as Dimitri, Verónika con K as Yesdasí, Alan Alarcón as Benito, Miguel Díaz-Morlet, Raphael Cubas, Ricardo Mansur, César Herrera
77	32	"Dígale"	Alan Coton	Elvin Rivera Ortega	17 September 2020	2.7
Emilio and his mother reappear in the life of Amanda and her son Daniel to try to get them back after Emilio is released from prison. Cast : Carla Müller as Amanda, Erik Díaz as Emilio, María Prado as Celia, Fernanda Vizzuet as Gaby, Kenneth Lagunes as Daniel
78	33	"Las mil y una noches"	Alan Coton	Paulina González Martínez	18 September 2020	2.5
Yazmin falls into alcoholism after the death of her parents and leaves her son Óscar under the protection of her sister Margarita, so an unbreakable bond is forged between them. Cast : Yuliana Peniche as Yazmin, Naidelyn Navarrete as Margarita, Luis Xavier, Manuel Riguezza, Carmen Rodríguez, Boris Duflos, Fernando Carlón, Andrea Tello, Iker Lara as Óscar
79	34	"Ya te olvidé"	Rodrigo Koelliker	Catalina Álvarez Watson	21 September 2020	2.9
Violeta wants to be an influencer and manages her social networks with her cousin, but she meets Fabián, a digital marketer who convinces her that he loves her to take advantage of her. Cast : Luisa Galindo as Violera Rojas, Gian Franco Apóstolo as Fabián Quintero, Lourdes Munguía, Antonio Arjonilla as Guille, Erwin Veytia
80	35	"Prefiero ser su amante"	Emmanuel Duprez	Gabriel Santos	22 September 2020	2.7
On the verge of being unfaithful to Carmen, Jorge meets a mysterious woman and allows himself to be seduced by her, later discovering that she is his own wife, who has initiated a radical change in herself. Cast : María José as Carmen, Alejandro Ávila as Jorge, Paola Toyos as Alicia, Salvador Ibarra, Rafael del Villar, Rafa Pineda, Adriana Deangelis, Paulina Toledo as Jazmín, María José Mariscal, Ximena Lara as Karina
81	36	"Amor prohibido"	Álex Ramírez	Camila Villagrán	23 September 2020	2.7
After being disappointed in her husband, Leticia begins a passionate relationship with Germán, a carpenter and worker in the project that she directs as an architect, and will challenge everyone for him. Cast : Candela Márquez as Leticia, Carlos Speitzer as Germán, Carlos Athié as Manuel, Ara Saldívar as Celia, Laura Montijano, Begoña López, Fer Trujillo, Manuel Bonilla, Luis Gerardo León
82	37	"Aunque no sea conmigo"	Emmanuel Duprez	Rodrigo Koelliker	24 September 2020	2.8
Carlos ends up in a coma when he was about to ask Eva to marry him. A year later, Eva's father asks Carlos's mother to tell his daughter that she has disconnected her son, not knowing that Carlos will wake up. Cast : Antonio Fortier as Carlos, Jocelyn Ibarra as Eva, Adrian Rubio as Diego, Eugenio Montessoro as Don Ernesto, Fabiana Perzábal Cristina, Jorge Pondal
83	38	"Lobo"	Alejandro Gamboa	Kerím Martínez	25 September 2020	2.8
Gerardo, owner of an advertising agency, takes the creative ideas of his students and his wife Carolina and tries to slow down her rising career, until she finally opens her eyes. Cast : Annesy Lozano as Carolina, Ricardo Crespo as Gerardo, Tomás Goros as Marcos, Magda Karina as Selma, Giovana Fuentes, Tania Niebla, Lizzette Cervantes as Nubia, Patricio de Rodas, Edgardo Arredondo "Dadá"
