= Esta historia me suena season 5 =

Esta historia me suena
- Season 5
- No. of episodes: 25

Release
- Original network: Las Estrellas
- Original release: 13 June – 15 July 2022

Season chronology
- ← Previous; Season 4 Next → Season 6

The fifth season of Esta historia me suena (shown onscreen as Esta historia me suena: Vol. 5) aired on Las Estrellas from 13 June 2022 to 15 July 2022. The season is produced by Genoveva Martínez and Televisa. The season consists of twenty-five episodes.

== Notable guest stars ==
- Adriana Nieto
- Wendy de los Cobos
- Geraldine Galván
- Jade Fraser
- Leticia Perdigón
- Luis Xavier
- Alpha Acosta
- Josh Gutiérrez
- Lupita Lara
- Adalberto Parra
- Helena Rojo
- Mauricio Barcelata
- Amaranta Ruíz
- Aida Pierce
- Isaura Espinoza
- Diana Golden
- Mariana Ochoa
- Violeta Isfel
- Alejandro Tommasi
- Mané de la Parra
- Gaby Mellado
- Mónica Dionne
- Aleida Núñez
- Ariel López Padilla
- Alberto Estrella
- Luz María Jerez
- Paty Díaz
- Maribel Fernández
- Ignacio Guadalupe
- Carlos Espejel
- Carmen Becerra
- Ivonne Montero
- Anna Ciocchetti
- Eric del Castillo

== Episodes ==
No. overall	No. in season	Title	Directed by	Written by	Original release date	MEX viewers (millions)
114	1	"Creo en mí"	Rodrigo Koelliker	Kerím Martínez	13 June 2022 (Note: Premiered early online through Las Estrellas website on 9 June 2022.)	2.4
Camila is blamed for the accidental death of her brother and is sent to Canada. Nine years later, Camila returns to confront her father. Cast : Adriana Nieto as Alicia, Héctor Kotsifakis as Rogelio, Julia Argüelles as Camila, Raúl Coronado as Fausto, Rosie Pellizer, Luna Sophia, Mariano Ramos, Edmundo Velarde as Mateo
115	2	"Una hora más"	Alan Coton	Santiago Mesa	14 June 2022	2.6
Liliana is about to marry Patricio, but Violeta will take it upon herself to prevent the wedding. Cast : Wendy de los Cobos as Graciela, Geraldine Galván as Violeta, Jade Fraser as Liliana, Iván Ochoa as Patricio, Leticia Perdigón, Luis Xavier as Ernesto, Alejandro Belmonte as Mario, Emilio Bravo as Miguel, Jaime Vega
116	3	"Leona dormida"	Rodrigo Koelliker	Rodrigo Koelliker	15 June 2022	2.6
Gaby falls in love with her son's best friend when he comes to stay at her house for a few days. Cast : Alpha Acosta as Gaby, Gabriela Zas, Rodrigo Virago, Juan Verduzco, Ramiro Tomasini, Diana Haro, Ilse Estrada, Aurea Zapata, Daniela Avendaño, Itzel Amador, Patricia Guilliem, Nicole Salgado Hernández, Sergio Corona, Paola Longoria
117	4	"Creo en ti"	Álex Ramírez	Elvin Rivera Ortega	16 June 2022	2.2
Álvaro tries to resume his life after being in jail for the accident that killed a mother and daughter, but the sudden appearance of Carolina, a strange woman who decides to help him, complicates everything. Cast : Josh Gutiérrez as Álvaro Cisneros, Ligia Uriarte as Carolina, Lupita Lara, Bárbara Falconi, Laura Cortés, María Andrea as Verónica Román, Fernando Orozco, Angelique Montalvo, Mía Martínez
118	5	"Ingobernable"	Jorge Senyal	Santiago Mesa	17 June 2022	2.2
María José takes advantage of Beto's capture to flee from the house where she remains at her son's side. María José looks for her aunt to help her and as the days go by she gets a job as a waitress, but later she is pursued by Beto's men. Cast : Adalberto Parra as Adalberto Estrada, Rocío Reyna as María José, Cruz Rendel, Pocholo, Catalina López, Ángel Cerlo, Guss Morales, Leonardo Granados, Noé Romero
119	6	"Torero"	Emmanuel Duprez	Gabriel Santos	20 June 2022	2.5
Pepe meets Emma, a woman who has trouble remembering things, but this gives him encouragement to move forward after the accident his grandson suffered. Cast : Helena Rojo as Emma, Álvaro Guerrero as Pepe, Pablo Valentín, Tania Riquenes, Juan Carlos Casasola, José Manuel Lechuga, Sandra Benhumea, Karla Mora, Lucas Mollard
120	7	"Maquillaje"	Rodrigo Koelliker	Camila Villagrán	21 June 2022	2.5
Bruno prepares to get the leading role in a play, but first he must show himself as a woman, without imagining that he will make an impact. Cast : Mauricio Barcelata, Anahí Allué, Susana Jiménez, Eduardo Barquin as Bruno, Feliza Logo, Tomás Madina, Alberto Reyes Martínez, Gustavo Báez
121	8	"Con la misma piedra"	Emmanuel Duprez	Carlos Pérez Ortega	22 June 2022	3.1
Sharon is the top student of her class, but after changing her look she is noticed by Rafael, the criminal of the neighborhood, with whom she ends up falling in love. Cast : Amaranta Ruíz, Fran Ropero as Rafael "Jiotes", Frida Tavera as Sharon, Tania Niebla, Daniel Rascón, Aida Pierce, Isabella Carrera, Julio Grijalva, Francisco Javier Chapa, Yankesy Estrada
122	9	"Te voy a perder"	Álex Ramírez	Rodrigo Koelliker	23 June 2022	2.3
Samantha is an artist who just before presenting her first exhibition discovers that she suffers from melanoma in both eyes, so her eyes must be removed. Cast : Jessica Decote as Samantha, Enrique Montaño, Isaura Espinoza, Diana Golden, Alicia Encinas, Álvaro Sagone, Ana Paula del Moral, Claudia Santiago
123	10	"Shabadabada"	Rodrigo Koelliker	Tonantzin García	24 June 2022	2.0
After her divorce, Gema sponsors a children's band, unaware that she will be reunited with a former member of her band. Cast : Mariana Ochoa as Gema, Adrián Rubio Álvarez, Violeta Isfel, Alejandro Tommasi, José Montini, Taisia Sigala, Regi Mendoza, Emanuel Ramírez, Sergio Barberi, Beba Cuervo, Sofía Mariel, Alicia Camps, Noé Romero
124	11	"Dos mujeres, un camino"	Jorge Senyal	Paulina González Martínez	27 June 2022	2.5
Ana needs money to continue with her daughter Regina's rehabilitation and Laura proposes to Ana to rent her womb in exchange for paying for Regina's therapies. Cast : Sergio Bonilla, Lorena del Castillo, Claudia Troyo as Lucía, Pamela Ruz, Amara Villafuerte, Fernando Sansores, Ricardo de la Parra, Miguel Garza, Tania Nicole
125	12	"¿Dónde estás, Yolanda?"	Jorge Senyal	Álex Ramírez	28 June 2022	2.5
Yolanda, a famous singer, is searched by the police after her disappearance, but Guillermo, her boyfriend, is identified as the main suspect. Cast : Roxana Puente as Yolanda Valdezpino, Jonathan Becerra, Marcela Salazar, Mauricio Rousselon as Guillermo, Tomás Goros, Patricia Martínez as Cristina Cordero, Isadora González, Diego de Tovar, Jorge Badillo, Marco Antonio Silva, Alan del Castillo, Noé Romero, La Sonora Santanera as themselves
126	13	"Me gusta"	Emmanuel Duprez	Carlos Pérez Ortega	29 June 2022	2.5
Fausto will be reunited with his childhood sweetheart, when Susana arrives to sue and collect an old debt with his stepmother. Cast : Mané de la Parra as Fausto, Gaby Mellado as Susana Figueroa / Susan Kelly, Mónica Dionne as Macaria, Aldo Guerra, Edna Alcocer, Rafael Amador, Carlos Marmen, Flora Fernández as Amalia Figueroa, Ana Laura Espinosa, Lautaro Ibars, José Antonio Estrada, Sofía Patiño, Lorena Sevilla, Jean Paul Tardan, Julio Murguía
127	14	"Juegos de amor"	Alan Coton	Elvin Rivera Ortega	30 June 2022	2.0
Aura separates from her husband because of his addiction problem, but when looking for a new partner she meets Gonzalo, whom she knows little about, but spends their first night together. Cast : Pamela Grauri, José Carlos Farrera, Carlos Athié, Cecilia Ponce, María José Mariscal
128	15	"Una aventura"	Jorge Senyal	Itzia Pintado	1 July 2022	2.3
Toñito and his family celebrate the fact that he is soon to fulfill his dreams of becoming a marine biologist in Ensenada, but all this is overshadowed by a group of criminals who kill him. Toñito's parents, Titina and Lucho, seek to revive their relationship with an adventure after his death. Cast : Aleida Núñez as Titina, Ariel López Padilla, Eugenia Arriola, Memo Dorantes, Francisco Avendaño, Luis Carranza, Axel Araiza, Carmen María Kuri, Javier Ruiz, Emiliano Santa Cruz, Ángel Carbó, Noé Romero
129	16	"Que lo nuestro se quede en nuestro"	Rodrigo Koelliker	Carolina Álvarez Watson	4 July 2022	2.5
Octavio tries to take advantage of his son's girlfriend, Alenka, but she manages to escape the harassment. When Alenka tells Pablo the truth, he defends his father, not knowing that he is guilty. Cast : Alberto Estrella as Octavio, Luz María Jerez, Paty Díaz, Maribel Fernández, Ignacio Guadalupe, Ivonne Ley, Carlos Fonseca, Marisol Meneses, Humberto Búa, Ricardo Escobar, Gerardo Santínez, Arturo Vinales
130	17	"Siempre a mí"	Jorge Senyal	Andrea Marra	5 July 2022	2.7
Suárez wants to act on the case of a missing woman and her daughter, but the behavior of her partner Víctor makes her suspicious of him. Cast : Gabriela Zamora, Vilma Sotomayor, Constantino Costas, Toña Valdés, Ana Paula Martínez, Yam Acevedo, Carmen Vera, Julia Margaleff, Armando Silva, Alex Delarosa, Indra Duarte, Paty Fernández de Castro, James Hollcroft
131	18	"Libre"	Álex Ramírez	Camila Villagrán	6 July 2022	2.5
Fidel and his friends take advantage of Elena by intoxicating her with a drink and then taking her by force. The moment is recorded and broadcast, and she suffers cyberbullying, since the video goes viral. Cast : Yanet Sedano, Nicole Curiel, Alexa Archundia, María Filippini, Lilo Durazo, Eduardo Castillo, Samantha Orozco, José Camar, Federico Di Lorenzo, Omar Reyes, Irving Copla, Jorge Nava
132	19	"Perdono y olvido"	Álex Ramírez	Itzia Pintado	7 July 2022	2.4
Conchita learns from her daughter that her husband is unfaithful with her best friend's mother. Conchita loses her baby and decides to leave her husband. Cast : Carlos Espejel as José, Carmen Becerra, Nora Velázquez, Marcia Coutiño as Conchita, Melissa Dominique as Sofía, Abril Michel as Lucía, Rodrigo Nuño, Jorge Richards, Laura Pons, Jorge Monter
133	20	"Vive"	Jorge Senyal	Tonantzin García	8 July 2022	2.2
Valeria meets Edgar, a young man who takes advantage of her, even though Valeria does not want to spend the night with him. Cast : Alberto Pavón, Deborah Ríos, Andrea Mextli, Shaula Satinka as Valeria, Joan Kuri as Edgar, Fernanda Sasse, Perla Corona, Mónica Pont, Ana Sofí, Gerónimo Salazar Mito, Noé Romero
134	21	"Cruz de olvido"	Emmanuel Duprez	Carlos Pérez Ortega	11 July 2022	2.9
Juana is a woman enrolled in the U.S. Army who, while defending herself against a man on the street, is deported to Mexico, where she meets the ex-fiancée of a fellow soldier who died in her arms. Cast : Ivonne Montero as Juana, Ana Silvia Garza, Isi Rojano, Rodrigo Magaña, Napoleón Glockner, Pedro Romo, Eric Prats, Yael Fernández, Juan Carlos Ramírez Ayala, Juan Ríos de la Fuente, Adriana Tepale, Iahn
135	22	"Un día más de vida"	Alan Coton	Tonantzin García	12 July 2022	2.4
Emilia is diagnosed with hypertrophic cardiomyopathy, but she fights against all odds to win a medal in gymnastics. Cast : Arantza Ruiz as Emilia, Deicardi Díaz, Vanessa Acosta, Rebeca Fouilloux, Derek Arnauda, Mónica Chávez, Eduardo Cáceres, Beto Zaldívar, Christian Izaguirre, Juan Morales, Alex Durán
136	23	"Si nos dejan"	Alan Coton	Gabriel Santos	13 July 2022	2.5
The death of Ivanka, a mobster's mistress, appears to be suspicious and the police immediately begin to investigate the possible perpetrators of the crime. All evidence points to the mobster's other mistress, Jacky, as the culprit, but it is a trap. Cast : Anna Ciocchetti, Guillermo Quintanilla, Sachi Tamashiro, Ara Saldívar as Jacky, Eugenio Montessoro, Ariane Pellicer, Louis David Horne, Eduardo Marbán, Michel López, Flor Martino Bibolini as Ivanka, Leonardo Amézquita, Ámbar Luz
137	24	"Nada fue un error"	Rodrigo Koelliker	Catalina Álvarez Watson	14 July 2022	2.6
Ana Cris and Gabriel are separated after her family moves away, but after 12 years they are reunited; however, both have partners. Cast : Alejandra Redondo as Ana Cris, Mariana Ávila, Federico Espejo as Jorge, Eric Del Castillo, Marco Uriel, Nelly Lacayo, Pisano as Gabriel, Emilio Rafael Treviño, Eduardo Garzón, Regina Velarde, Dante Ávalos, Romina Graniewicz as Child Ana Cris
138	25	"Pienso en ti"	Emmanuel Duprez	Kerím Martínez	15 July 2022	2.3
Enio and Dani have been married for six years, but Flavia's illness provokes a strong argument when Dani learns that Enio has a son with Flavia. Cast : Marilyn Uribe as Dani, Sonia Franco as Flavia, Mauricio Abularach as Enio, Tania Ángeles, Rocío De Santiago, Alejandro Valencia as Cristian, Yahir Romo, Janpa, César Criollo
