= Esta historia me suena season 6 =

Esta historia me suena
- Season 6
- No. of episodes: 30

Release
- Original network: Las Estrellas
- Original release: 10 July – 18 August 2023

Season chronology
- ← Previous; Season 5

The sixth season of Esta historia me suena (shown onscreen as Esta historia me suena: Vol. 6) premiered on Las Estrellas on 10 July 2023. The season is produced by Genoveva Martínez for TelevisaUnivision. The season tackles current situations including femicide, drug addiction, and relationships between same-sex couples. The series theme song is now performed by Paty Cantú.

== Notable guest stars ==
- Agustín Arana
- Alejandra Lazcano
- Gerardo Murguía
- Michelle Vieth
- Gabriel Porras
- Carlos Bonavides
- Yolanda Ventura
- Henry Zakka
- Alex Perea
- Josh Gutiérrez
- Beatriz Moreno
- Cecilia Gabriela
- Jade Fraser
- Leticia Perdigon
- Julio Mannino
- Pablo Valentín
- Andrea Noli
- Malillany Marín
- Guillermo Iván
- Leonardo Daniel
- Eric del Castillo
- Eduardo España
- Ariel López Padilla
- Pedro Romo

== Production ==
The season was announced on 13 March 2023. Filming began on 15 May 2023.

== Episodes ==
No. overall	No. in season	Title	Directed by	Written by	Original release date	Mexico viewers (millions)
139	1	"Escándalo"	Carlos Santos	Tonantzin García	10 July 2023	2.2
Octavio is in love with Alexa, a trans woman and dancer whom he abandons because of Begoña's blackmail. Cast : Morganna Love as Alexa, Agustín Arana as Octavio, Alejandra Lazcano as Begoña, Paco Luna, Natasha Cubría, Gerardo Murguía, Isabella Ibarra, Emilio Caballero, Adlem Gaona, Alejandra Díaz León
140	2	"Culpable o inocente"	Carlos Santos	Kerim Martínez	11 July 2023	2.0
Naomi tries to prove the innocence of her fiancé, who is accused of sexual abuse by one of his students. Cast : Michelle Vieth as Naomi, Carmen Delgado, Germán Valdés III, Raquel Bustos, José Manuel Lechuga, Arena Ibarra, Bárbara Falconi, Talía Marcela, Larisa Mendizábal, Tzaitel, Diana Meza, Erasmo Ríos, María Islas, Osmar Lomas, Fossas, Octavio Aguilar
141	3	"Ya pasará"	Hildebrando Carballido	Carlos Pérez Ortega	12 July 2023	2.2
In an attempt to visit her dying father, Yenifer crosses illegally into the United States to see her father. Cast : Mayra Sérbulo, Gabriel Porras, Carlos Bonavides, Alejandra Haydee, Erick Israel Consuelo, Daphne Dalay, Francisco Calvillo, Edgar Alfaro, María José Parga, Enrique Logan, Emerson Zaragoza, Aída Torres, Itzel Amador, Caníbal JR., Yamile Pando, Fernando Vernale, Ever Lenam Razo, Alfredo Vernale, Alizia Oz, José de Jesús Mota, Yessi González, Daniel Marín, Carlos Bedolla
142	4	"Rosa Pastel"	Hildebrando Carballido	Catalina Álvarez Watson	13 July 2023	2.2
Alicia decides to break up with Pablo and start a new life alone to focus on the baby she is expecting. Cast : Vanessa Acosta, Ernesto Álvarez González, Dari Romo, Patricio de Rodas, Verito García, Alejandra Guinea, Johnny Montesana, Oneil Núñez
143	5	"No huyas de mí"	Alan Coton	Camila Villagrán	14 July 2023	2.0
Fabiana suffers an accident after finding her husband with another man. Cast : Yolanda Ventura as Fabiana, Esteban Soberanes, Luis Fernando Azuara, Emmanuel Morales, Sandra Benhumea, Macela Morett, Víctor Hugo Villanueva, Adriana Tepale, Luciano Cherone, Tonny Batres
144	6	"Yo no me doy por vencido"	Salvador Aguirre	Andrea Marra	17 July 2023	2.3
After being diagnosed with Alzheimer's disease, Martín tries not to forget his loved ones. Cast : Ana Karina Guevara, Víctor Civiera, Jorge Trejo Reyes, Paulina Ruiz, Jorge Levy V., Janitzio Caballero, Paola Flores, Karolina Gutzce, José Jaime Orozco, Ricardo Vera, Luz María Meza, Marco Kauffman, Andrés B. Durán
145	7	"Como me haces falta"	Héctor Márquez	Carlos Pérez Ortega	18 July 2023	2.2
Sharon looks for Violeta to demand justice and sue Fernando for a past crime. Cast : Tamara Mazarrasa, Isadora González, Bibelot Mansur, Giselle Aboumrad, Guillermo Quintanilla, Eduardo Rodríguez, Henry Zakka, Luis Felipe Montoya, Johjan Loyola, Jorge de Marín, Juan Pablo Luna, Anessy Lozano, Diego Acosta, María Ivanova, Victoria Del Valle, Daniel Gochi, Libia Regalado, Óscar Ramos, Juan Carlos Ramírez Ayala, Vicente Ferrer, Roberto Montes de Oca
146	8	"Mis sentimientos"	Hildebrando Carballido	Kerim Martínez	19 July 2023	1.9
Dante leaves Erik to fulfill his dream in Spain. A year later, Dante returns to look for Erik and finds out that he wrote a film of their relationship. Cast : Carlos Fonseca, Alejandra Andreu, Luz Edith Rojas, Sergio Velasco, Luis Uribe, Marco Uriel, Gina Pedret, Jean Paul Tardan
147	9	"Pedro Navaja"	Jorge Senyal	Elvin Rivera	20 July 2023	2.1
After spending 5 years in prison, Pedro seeks revenge on Daniel for arresting him. Cast : Alex Perea as Pedro, Josh Gutiérrez as Daniel, Luis Xavier as Rigoberto, Luisa Muriel, Ara Saldívar as Lucía, Palmeira Cruz as Josefina, Manuel Bonilla H., Diego Arancivia, Jimena Alcántara, Patricia Guilliem, Diana Mercado, Rodolfo Rodríguez "El Filos", Octavio Morales, Santy Rojas, René Nicolás
148	10	"¿Te ha pasado?"	Hildebrando Carballido	Elvin Rivera Ortega	21 July 2023	1.8
Maru is manipulated by Fabián to prevent her from fulfilling her dream of becoming a singer. Cast : Nuria Gil as Maru, Marcos Montero, Carlos Athié, Rodrigo Nuño, Arlette Pacheco, Mary Paz Banquells, Iván Bronstein, Pepe Olivares, Benhur Arguelló, Rocío Robles, Ana Sabrina
149	11	"Los caminos de la vida"	Héctor Márquez	Renata Orozco	24 July 2023	2.3
Ismael goes to work in a construction company to help his mother, but is bribed by his boss to keep quiet about the thefts he has committed. Cast : Úrsula Pruneda, Sebastián Fouilloux as Ismael, Víctor Carpinteiro, Christopher Valencia, Ricardo de Pascual, Patricia Martínez, Kenneth Lavill, Iker Lotina, Ángeles Balvanera, Sergio Feregrino, Beto Zaldívar, Eduardo Cáceres, Francisco Vilchis, Lety Grey
150	12	"Golpes en el corazón"	Alan Coton	Camila Villagrán	25 July 2023	2.3
Renata is manipulated by her boyfriend to break into Doña Cleo's house, where she works. Cast : Beatriz Moreno, Cecilia Gabriela, Lesslie Apodaca, Boris Duflos, Marco Valdés, Nancy Tamayo, Luz Gabriela Melgoza Solís, Juan Pedro Román, Martín Gómez Martí, Fernando Orozco
151	13	"A una señora"	Alan Coton	Santiago Mesa	26 July 2023	2.6
After several years, Román is reunited with Virginia and confesses his love for her. Cast : Verónica Terán, Ligia Uriarte, Rodrigo Zurita, Alejandro Valencia, Brianda Barajas, Simone Victoria, Carlos Moreno Cravioto, Robin Sanch, Eduardo Garzón, Constantino García, Mariana Garrdido
152	14	"Déjala tranquila"	Eduardo Said	Tonantzin García	27 July 2023	2.0
Nayeli starts working as an assistant accountant for a company without realizing the bad intentions of her boss. Cast : Mildred Feuchter as Nayeli, Jorge Losa, Nacho Ortiz, Iranzu Herrero, Deborah Ríos, Beto Reyes, Jessica Jiménez, Víctor Báez, Gilberto Miranda
153	15	"Mariposa Traicionera"	Hildebrando Carballido	Andrea Marra	28 July 2023	1.9
Maite becomes a seductive woman and makes a promise not to fall in love, but everything changes when she meets Diego. Cast : Jade Fraser as Maite, Rafael León, Antonio Alcántara, Elena Pérez, Daniela Montero, Magda Karina, José Luis Huerta, Carla Llosa, Augusto Di Paolo, Mauricio Camps, Andrés Absalón, Katia Samperio
154	16	"Mis impulsos sobre ti"	Carlos Santos	Itzia Pintado	31 July 2023	2.2
Luis and Frida come to live at Marlene's house and discover the secret that exists among the family. Cast : Leticia Perdigon, Julio Mannino, Leo Casta, Lizeth Goca, Lorena Bargallo, Nick Martínez
155	17	"Almohada"	Unknown	Itzia Pintado	1 August 2023	2.4
Chela puts aside her dreams to take care of her husband and daughter, who are alcoholics. Cast : Ana Silvia Garza, Sandra Burgos, Alfredo Huereca, María García Yunes, Rebeca Fouilloux, Lucio Porto, Emmanuel Okaury, Jonathan Ochoa
156	18	"Louis"	Hildebrando Carballido	Pablo Zuack	2 August 2023	2.0
Franco is reunited with his ex-girlfriend, Betty, who reveals a secret she has kept for years. Cast : Pablo Valentín, Andrea Noli, Gabriela Murray, Ailekh Duarte, Jorge Pondal, Axel Santos, Nicole Curiel, Mariela Rueda, Emiliano Santa Cruz
157	19	"Contrabando y traición"	Salvador Aguirre	Carlos Pérez Ortega	3 August 2023	2.2
Camelia leaves her old life behind to be with Emilio, who deceitfully leads her down the wrong path. Cast : Frida Tavera, Marco Zapata, Javier Escobar, Gabriela Bajaras, Manuel Martel, Gretha Yajayra, Ganna Andryukhina, Gia Franceschi, Gael Caballero, Gaby Tinajero, Ana Basilla, July Calderón
158	20	"Mala hierba"	Alan Coton	Carlos Pérez Ortega	4 August 2023	1.9
Ofelia sets out on a quest with Chucho to find her daughter. Cast : Malillany Marín as Ofelia, Seidy Bercht, Mauricio Rousselon, Rocío de Santiago, Óscar Medellín, Gabriel Carbajal, Celia Marcue, Rosita Bouchot, Daisy Salazar, Carlos Pelayo, Arath Carselle, Paulina Rico, Miriyana Carcruz, Victoria Sevilla, Edgar Marchena, Alejandro Romero, Dan Yusa
159	21	"¿Cómo pagarte?"	Salvador Aguirre	Catalina Álvarez Watson	7 August 2023	2.1
Marco puts his life at risk because of his addictions and thanks to Lourdes he receives a second chance. Cast : Aidan Vallejo, Roberto Sosa, Maya Ricote Rivero, Lucero Lander, Chantal Frías, Leticia Pedrajo, Arath Aquino, Mariana Rivera, Norma Criss, Manu Navarro
160	22	"Yo quisiera"	Alan Coton	Catalina Álvarez Watson	8 August 2023	2.3
Cast : Gloria Aura, Daniel Gama, Gloria Mayo, Elías Campos, Sofía Olea Levet, Diana Golden
161	23	"Si no te hubieras ido"	Unknown	Elvin Rivera	9 August 2023	2.0
Andres' family abandons him after he refuses to treat his ADHD. Cast : Guillermo Iván, Paola Toyos, Mía Fabri, Kaled Acab, Andrea Méndez, Alfredo Barrera, Ingrid Manjarrez, Fernando Carlón
162	24	"Mi último viaje"	Alexander Aranda	Gabriel Santos	10 August 2023	2.5
Lupe and Goyo are about to become parents, but Goyo wants to have one last fling before becoming a father. He tries to flirt with Itzel, Lupe's friend and the baby's future godmother. Cast : Cristina Michaus, Juan Carlo Medellín, Ari Albarrán, Gabriela Núñez, Laura Daniela, Fernando Manzano, Samuel Gallegos, Carlos Segura, José Alfaro
163	25	"Fabricando fantasías"	Alexander Aranda	Carlos Pérez Ortega	11 August 2023	2.4
Ernestina and Esteban buy a reborn doll to get over the loss of their daughter, but things get out of control. Cast : Elena del Río, Mauricio Abularach, Kari Romu, Pedro Joaquín, Rafa Pineda, Jesús J. Lozano, Eduardo de Juambelz, Martín Muñoz, Daniel Moya, Mary Juaper
164	26	"Aunque ahora estés con él"	Hildebrando Carballido	Alex Ramírez	14 August 2023	2.5
Liliana and Roberto live an unhappy marriage and after the appearance of Jonás, Liliana's ex-boyfriend, she reflects on her life and makes a drastic decision. Cast : Elsa Ortíz, Raúl Sandoval, José Carlos Farrera, Montserrat Curis, Yael Fernández, Karyme Hernández, Stephanie Haddad, Carlos Larrañaga, Gerson Martínez, Andy Lu, Alma Rosa Añorve, Alex Padilla, Blanca de Souza, Ricardo Escobar, Martín Villarreal, Julio Maldonado, Christian Izaguirre
165	27	"Tus jefes no me quieren"	Alex Ramírez	Carlos Pérez Ortega	15 August 2023	2.2
Eddie falls in love with Soni, but her father's business dealings cause several obstacles in their relationship. Cast : Enoc Leaño as Óscar Salamanca, Toñita "La Negra de Oro", Aleyda Gallardo, Nelly González, Toño Valdés as Eddie, Claudia Acosta, Gerardo Santinez, Lucas Mollard, Rosalía Grim, Jesús Fernández
166	28	"Sin Sentimientos"	Héctor Márquez	Renata Orozco	16 August 2023	2.2
Penélope falls in love with Roberto, who abandons her after being blackmailed with compromising photos. Cast : Zaide Silvia Gutiérrez, Leonardo Daniel, Carmen Muga, Enrique Montaño, Héctor Soberón, Epy Vélez, Dobrina Cristeva, Jennifer Sáenz, Mayte Carranco, Vikingo, Alejandra Ochoa, Sandra Montoya, Heberto Silva, Brigitte Baynes, Luz Elena Saldívar, Guadalupe Verzace, Tedy Álvarez, Erika Carrillo, Guss Morales, Enrique Logan, Miguel Papantla
167	29	"Cuando mueres por alguien"	Héctor Márquez	Elizabeth Cruz	17 August 2023	2.3
Alejandro recovers the desire to move forward thanks to Blanquita, keeping a secret that could change everything. Cast : Eric del Castillo, Eduardo España as Alejandro Cruz, Anna Silvetti, Camila Rivas, Diego Valenco, Carlos Hendrick, Miranda Rinaldi, Karla Cuevas, Raúl Arrieta, Armando Durán, Luisa Dander, Érick de la Luz Glez, Christian Venegas, Dan Yusa, Fred Suárez, Leonardo León
168	30	"Matador"	Jorge Senyal	Santiago Mesa	18 August 2023	2.1
Sara and Alonso try to take advantage of Patricio to avenge the death of their brother Eduardo, since Patricio's father was responsible for his death. Cast : Ariel López Padilla, Ariann Murad, Alphonso Escobedo, Dyego Toussaint, Pedro Romo, Claudia Frías, Julio Sandoval, León André, Andrés Córdova, Aram Camacho, Maleny Arredondo, Guadalupe Rammath, Ordy, Pamela Grauri, Erick Kiriel
