= Así se baila =

American Spanish-language reality show

- Genre: Reality competition
- Presented by: Jacqueline Bracamontes
- Judges: Adamari López; Cristián de la Fuente; Mariana Seoane
- Country of origin: United States
- Original language: Spanish
- No. of seasons: 1
- No. of episodes: 13

Production
- Executive producers: Francisco "Cisco" Suárez; Macarena Moreno
- Production locations: Telemundo Center; Miami, Florida
- Camera setup: Multi-camera
- Running time: 120 minutes
- Production company: Telemundo Studios

Original release
- Network: Telemundo
- Release: September 12 – December 5, 2021

Así se baila (English title: That's How You Dance) is an American Spanish-language reality show that premiered on Telemundo on September 12, 2021. It is hosted by Jacqueline Bracamontes with the judging panel consisting of Adamari López, Cristián de la Fuente and Mariana Seoane. The series was executive produced by Francisco "Cisco" Suárez and Macarena Moreno, with casting by Francisco Ponce.

== Format ==
The reality show revolves around 11 dance partnerships consisting of a known celebrity, accompanied by their significant other, family member or friend. They compete every week, in order to advance and eventually become the winning couple of the $200,000 prize.

== Series overview ==
Season	Premiere	Finale	Winners	Second place	Third place	Host	Judges		
1	September 12, 2021	December 5, 2021	Gregorio and Luna Pernía	Samadhi and Adriano Zendejas	Adrián Di Monte and Sandra Itzel	Jacqueline Bracamontes	Adamari López	Cristián de la Fuente	Mariana Seoane

== Participants ==
Celebrity & Partner	Age	Profession	Relationship	Status
Kimberly Jiménez	24	Model and beauty pageant	Wife and husband	Eliminated 1st on September 26, 2021
Yasmany Rodriguez	34		Wife and husband	Eliminated 1st on September 26, 2021
Laura Flores	58	Actress, host and singer	Friends	Eliminated 2nd on October 10, 2021
Gabriel Porras	53	Actor	Friends	Eliminated 2nd on October 10, 2021
David Chocarro	41	Actor and model	Husband and wife	Withdrew on October 24, 2021
Carolina Laursen	41	Actress	Husband and wife	Withdrew on October 24, 2021
Kimberly Loaiza	23	Influencer and singer	Wife and husband	Withdrew on October 31, 2021
Juan De Dios "JD" Pantoja	25	Singer	Wife and husband	Withdrew on October 31, 2021
Jennifer Peña	37	Singer and actress	Wife and husband	Eliminated 3rd on November 13, 2021
Obie Bermúdez	40	Singer-songwriter	Wife and husband	Eliminated 3rd on November 13, 2021
Elyfer Torres	24	Actress	Friends	Withdrew on October 31, 2021
Valeria Sandoval	25	Singer	Friends	Eliminated 4th on November 28, 2021
Polo Monárrez	42	Actor	Friends	Eliminated 4th on November 28, 2021
Lorenzo Méndez	34	Singer	Friends	Fourth place on December 5, 2021
Jessica Díaz	29	Actress and singer	Friends	Fourth place on December 5, 2021
Adrián Di Monte	31	Actor	Ex-husband and Ex-wife	Third place on December 5, 2021
Sandra Itzel	27	Actress and singer	Ex-husband and Ex-wife	Third place on December 5, 2021
Samadhi Zendejas	26	Actress	Siblings	Runners-up on December 5, 2021
Adriano Zendejas	25	Actor	Siblings	Runners-up on December 5, 2021
Gregorio Pernía	51	Actor	Father and daughter	Winners on December 5, 2021
Luna Pernía	15	Student	Father and daughter	Winners on December 5, 2021

== Ratings ==
Viewership and ratings per season of Así se baila
Season	Timeslot (ET)	Episodes	First aired		Last aired		Avg. viewers (millions)
Season	Timeslot (ET)	Episodes	Date	Viewers (millions)	Date	Viewers (millions)	Avg. viewers (millions)
1	Sunday 8:00 p.m. (1-7); Sunday 9:00 p.m. (8-13)	12	September 12, 2021	1.03	December 5, 2021	1.20	0.97
