= Lo imperdonable (2015 TV series) =

- Genre: Telenovela
- Created by: Caridad Bravo Adams
- Written by: Ximena Suárez; Ricardo Fiallega; Janely Lee; Alejandra Díaz
- Directed by: Mónica Miguel; Víctor Manuel Fouilloux; Alberto Diaz
- Starring: Ana Brenda Contreras; Iván Sánchez; Sergio Sendel; Grettell Valdéz; Juan Ferrara; Claudia Ramírez; Guillermo Capetillo; Alicia Machado; Gaby Mellado; Sebastián Zurita; Guillermo García Cantú
- Theme music composer: Fernando Rossi; Pablo Durano; Elmer Figueroa Arce
- Opening theme: "Tú respiración" by Chayanne
- Ending theme: "Cómo perdonar" by Ana Brenda Contreras
- Country of origin: Mexico
- Original language: Spanish
- No. of episodes: 121

Production
- Executive producer: Salvador Mejía Alejandre
- Producer: Aarón Gutiérrez Méndez
- Production locations: Huasteca, San Luis Potosi; Sótano de las Golondrinas; Ciudad Valles
- Editors: Ricardo Tejera; Marco A. Rocha Maza; Alfredo Frutos Maza

Original release
- Network: Canal de las Estrellas
- Release: April 20 – October 4, 2015

Related
- La mentira (1998)

Lo imperdonable (English: Unforgivable) is a Mexican telenovela produced by Salvador Mejía Alejandre for Televisa. Based on the telenovela La mentira (1998).

Ana Brenda Contreras and Iván Sánchez star as the protagonists, with Sebastián Zurita, Gaby Mellado, Claudia Ramírez and Sergio Sendel star as the co-protagonists, while Grettell Valdéz, Juan Ángel Esparza and Guillermo García Cantú star as the antagonists.

== Plot ==
Martín San Telmo comes to a small, remote town called Mina Escondida where his wanted half-brother, Demetrio, lives and works in a gold mine; upon arrival, Martín discovers that Demetrio has committed suicide after being betrayed by a heartless and ambitious woman who only played with his emotions. Little by little, and thanks to the help of the inhabitants (which initially were hostile to him but later became his friends), Martin manages to determine what led Demetrio to commit suicide so tragically.

Martin's investigation leads him to Mexico City, to a millionaires' mansion, of the Prado Castelo family, who own one of the most important jewelry companies in the country. According to information that Martin has managed to discover, the woman for whom Demetrio took his life is living in that house and her name begins with the letter V. He knows this because she had left Demetrio a necklace with the initial V and the Prado Castelo surname recorded in it.

Martin meets two young women there, Verónica and Virginia Prado Castelo, both nieces of the family: innocent and fragile Virginia and Verónica, who is strong and courageous. Without knowing, which is the guilty one, Martin concludes, after a series of coincidences and rumours, that the woman who he seeks is Veronica. Thus, begins his revenge plan: first to flirt with Verónica, seduce her and make her fall in love with him, and finally marry her.

After the wedding, Martin almost kidnaps her and takes her to Mina Escondida where Demetrio committed suicide, determined to make her life miserable and take revenge for the suicide of his brother.

Little does he know, like Verónica, they are actually victims of Virginia Padro Castelo, an evil and ambitious woman whose angelic face hides a wicked spirit. The purpose of Virginia's marriage to Emiliano, her cousin, the only son of Jorge and Salma Prado Castelo, is to change her status and become Mrs. Prado Castelo by double-entry and thus gain all the wealth of the family.

When Martin discovers the truth, everything will seem lost as Verónica abandons him because of his distrust and will be left looking the fool for believing people who only have bad intentions. For this reason, Martin will have to fight very hard to regain the love of his life.

== Cast ==
Cast was confirmed on April 17, 2015.

=== Main cast ===
- Ana Brenda Contreras as Verónica Prado Castelo
- Iván Sánchez as Martín San Telmo
- Sergio Sendel as Emiliano Prado Castelo
- Grettell Valdéz as Virginia Prado Castelo
- Juan Ferrara as Jorge Prado Castelo
- Claudia Ramírez as Magdalena Castilla de Botel
- Guillermo Capetillo as Padre Juan
- Alicia Machado as Claudia Ordaz
- Gaby Mellado as Ana Perla Sánchez
- Sebastián Zurita as Pablo Hidalgo
- Guillermo García Cantú as Aarón Martínez

=== Supporting cast ===
- Marcelo Buquet as Aquiles Botel
- Mar Contreras as Nanciyaga
- Juan Ángel Esparza as Manuel Sánchez Álvarez
- Paty Díaz as Raymunda Álvarez
- Gabriela Goldsmith as Montserrat
- Roberto Ballesteros as Joaquín Arroyo
- Jackie Sauza as Mariana
- Delia Casanova as Matilde
- Michel Duval as Teo
- Camil Hazouri as Polo
- Ricardo Franco as Julio
- Elsa Cárdenas as Jovita
- Patsy as Salma Prado Castelo
- Salvador Sánchez as Crescencio Álvarez
- Osvaldo de León as Dr. Daniel
- Pablo Montero as Demetrio Silveria
- Gonzalo Vivanco as Pierre Dussage
- Raúl Magaña as Alfredo
- Tania Lizardo as Blanca Arroyo Álvarez "Blanquita"
- Danna García as Rebeca Rojo
- Diego Olivera as Jerónimo

== Mexico broadcast ==
As of April 20, 2015, Canal de las Estrellas is broadcasting Lo imperdonable weeknights at 9:25pm, replacing Hasta el fin del mundo. Univision aired Lo imperdonable in the United States on May 18, 2015, weeknights at 9pm/8c replacing Hasta el fin del mundo. The last episode was broadcast on November 2, 2015, with Pasión y poder replacing it the next day.

Timeslot (MT)	No. of episodes	Premiered		Ended	
Timeslot (MT)	No. of episodes	Date	Premiere viewers (in points)	Date	Finale viewers (in points)
Monday to Friday 9:25PM	121	April 20, 2015	21.4	October 4, 2015	—N/a

== Soundtrack ==
List of confirmed songs.

Track	Song	Running time	Notes
1	"Tú respiración" by Chayanne	4:07	Opening theme
2	"Siempre en mi mente" by Juan Gabriel and Espinoza Paz	3:56	
3	"Cómo perdonar" by Ana Brenda Contreras	—N/a	End theme
