= Esta historia me suena season 2 =

2019 Mexican television season

Esta historia me suena
- Season 2
- No. of episodes: 15

Release
- Original network: Las Estrellas
- Original release: 18 December 2019 – 22 March 2020

Season chronology
- ← Previous; Season 1 Next → Season 3

The second season of Esta historia me suena (shown onscreen as Esta historia me suena: Vol. 2) aired from 18 December 2019 to 22 March 2020 on Las Estrellas. The season is produced by Genoveva Martínez and Televisa. The season consists of fifteen one-hour episodes. The episodes are named after classic songs. Filming of the season began on 16 August 2019. The entire season is available via streaming on Blim TV.

Each episode of the second season is presented by the singer María José.

== Notable guest stars ==
- Ana Bertha Espín
- Rossana San Juan
- Erik Díaz
- Carmen Madrid
- Moisés Arizmendi
- Diana Golden
- Hernán Mendoza
- Sharis Cid
- Francisco de la O
- Margarita Magaña
- Luz Elena González
- Raquel Olmedo
- Arleth Terán
- Queta Lavat

== Episodes ==
No. overall	No. in season	Title	Directed by	Written by	Original release date	MEX viewers (millions)
31	1	"En el muelle de San Blas"	Emmanuel Duprez	Carlos Pérez Ortega	18 December 2019 (Note: Premiered early online through Las Estrellas website and YouTube channel on 13 December 2019.)	2.4
Gerardo brings his mother's ashes to meet "the crazy woman" of the famous song of 'En el muelle de San Blas'. After thinking that she was dead, he finds Doña Berenice, who tells her story. Cast : Ana Bertha Espín, Rossana San Juan, Erik Díaz, Ana Lorena Elorduy, Christian Ramos as Gerardo, Pillincito, Marbella Avilez, Gabriel Roustand, Gregorio Reséndiz, Francisco Baños, Diego Rico
32	2	"Aléjate de mí"	Alan Coton	Pablo Zuack	19 December 2019	N/A
Mario confesses to his girlfriend Camila that he has HIV, she also gets infected. Camila's father wants her away from home, her mother saves her from suicide and she will seek to move forward with her life. Cast : Marcia Coutiño, Alejandro Aragón as Alberto, Jonathan Kuri González as Mario, Seidy Bercht as Camila, Juan Diego Stevenel, Aaron Ida as Samuel, Antonio Alegre
33	3	"Quién como tú"	Alejandro Gamboa	Gabriel Santos	20 December 2019	N/A
Pilar is secretly in love with her brother-in-law Toño, husband of her sister Erika. When Toño and Erika discover that they cannot have children, Pilar proposes to be the child's surrogate mother. Cast : Gloria Aura as Erika, Elizabeth Valdez as Pilar, Raúl Coronado as Toño, Carmen Madrid, Óscar Bonfiglio, Anna Cepinska as Carolina, Julián Pablo Domínguez, Mariana Vázquez Brito
34	4	"Simplemente amigos"	Rodrigo Koelliker	Camila Villagrán	2 January 2020	N/A
Fanny works as a waitress and her father wants her to be the girlfriend of Cristóbal, the son of a butcher shop owner, for which she will sabotage her relationship with Salvador, a migrant with whom she is in love with. Cast : Cruz Rendel as Salvador, Ana Karina Sáenz as Fanny, Adalberto Parra, Pilar Ixquic Mata as Martha, Guillermo Lozma, Axel Muñiz, July Carlderón, Franccesco as Cristóbal
35	5	"El color de tus ojos"	Alejandro Gamboa	Paulina González Martínez	3 January 2020	2.6
Silvana files for divorce from her manipulative husband and upon hearing this, her daughter faints. Silvana crashers her car with Jorge's car when taking her daughter to the hospital, who is captivated by her clear eyes. Cast : Carlos Fonseca as Jorge, Estela Redondo, Mariana Morones as Silvana, Moisés Arizmendi as Rubén, Hildeberto Maya, Ana Tena as Laura, Jaime Lozano, Sylvia Suárez, Roberto Mares, Montserrat Mendoza
36	6	"No Controles"	Jorge Senyal	Elizabeth Cruz	7 January 2020	2.7
Dolores's father wants her to study architecture, but when her best friend invites her to wrestling event, she will face her great dream: to be a wrestler. Cast : Roberta Burns, Cuahutli Jiménez, Carmen Baque, Aaron Rivero, Luna Soto, Samuel Briceño, Miguel Ángel Pontón, Litzi Ruíz, Vannia Hernández
37	7	"¿Qué Me Faltó?"	Alejandro Gamboa	Carlos Pérez Ortega	8 January 2020	2.7
Lupita suffers the recent wedding of her ex-boyfriend. Full of disappointment, she sings in a café bar where she is discovered by a judge of a singing reality show that catapults her to fame. Cast : Natalia Sosa as Lupita, Javier Díaz Dueñas, Roy, Manunna, Lilo Durazo, Luis Carranza, Roberto Montes de Oca, Andre Real, Tania Saenz
38	8	"La Mejor Versión de Mí"	Rodrigo Koelliker	Elvin Rivera Ortega	9 January 2020	2.8
Julieta is an insecure girl who submits to Sebastián, a boy who thinks she is the love of his life, but who is actually a narcissistic psychopath never medically treated. Cast : Nuria Gil as Julieta, Javier Ponce as Sebastián, Fernanda Beltrán, Diana Golden, Lorena San Martín, Daniela Ortiz Rentería
39	9	"Qué bello"	Emmanuel Duprez	Carlos Pérez Ortega	10 January 2020	2.7
Teresa decides to file for divorce from her husband, the municipal president of Minatitlán, after one more of his infidelities. This will inadvertently take off her political career. Cast : Hernán Mendoza as Guillermo "Memo" Rosales, Sugey Ábrego as Teresa Rosales, Ricardo Kleinbaum, Mireia Lalaguna, Emilio Rafael Treviño, Frida Tostado, Fer Trujillo, Jorge Gutiérrez, Gabo Cruz
40	10	"Como Tu Mujer"	Rodrigo Koelliker	Paulina González Martínez	13 January 2020	2.5
After seeing her sister to catch up, Pilar is sexually abused and beaten. Now she must overcome this hard experience and her husband's infidelity. Cast : Sharis Cid as Pilar, Francisco de la O, Margarita Magaña, Lucero Lander, Lorena Álvarez, Vanesa Montemayor, Luna Castro, Emiliano Ulloa, Adolfo de la Fuente, Rafael Santé
41	11	"Más Fuerte De Lo Que Pensaba"	Alan Coton	Carlos Pérez Ortega	14 January 2020	3.3
Zazil is a beautiful model who is successful in a major brand of bras, but surprisingly she finds out that she suffers from breast cancer and needs a mastectomy. Cast : Ricardo Kleinbaum as Fabio, Naile López as Zazil, Patricia Martínez, Caraly Sánchez, Bettyna Roca, Gina Pedret, Lina Motta, Jorge Monter, Fernando Carlon, Julián Martínez, Bárbara Barquín
42	12	"Bazar"	Rodrigo Koelliker	Tonantzin García	15 January 2020	3.1
Ilse and Fabiola are two friends who fall in love with Miguel, a boy who sells records in a bazaar. After a misunderstanding, the friends distance themselves, but years later, their children will fall in love. Cast : Luz Elena González, Tania Riquenes, Raquel Olmedo, Zeltzin Suárez, Daniela Noguez, Ignacio Casano, Andrea Gio, Mauricio Abularach, Lizette Araiza, Bruno Santamaría, Alberto Reyes, Mariana Lambarri, Aida Torres
43	13	"Mujer contra mujer"	Emmanuel Duprez	Rodrigo Koelliker	16 January 2020	3.0
Karen is in love with her best friend Alexa with whom she prepares in fencing to qualify for the Pan American Games, but when Alexa starts dating Hugo, Karen cannot hide her jealousy. Cast : Alberto Estrella, Luz María Jerez, María Filippini, Epy Velez, Susana Jiménez, Antonio Alcántara
44	14	"La llave"	Jorge Senyal	Itza Pintado	17 January 2020	3.2
Meli supports her sister Dalia in a lie that costs her life. Faced with Meli's femicide, Dalia seeks justice in front of a group of abusive and murderous juniors. Cast : Prisila Gee, Moises Peñalosa, Juan Pablo Rocha, Karla Peniche, Ivonne Ley, Raúl Buenfil, Eduardo Amer as Rodrigo, Fernanda Rivas, Paola Real.
45	15	"Mientes tan bien"	Rodrigo Koelliker	Tonantzin García	22 March 2020	2.2
After being abandoned by her husband, Lorena meets Alex in her gym, a younger man to whom she offers a job and whom she falls in love with, but he will only take advantage of her. Cast : Arleth Terán as Lorena, Susy-Lu, Queta Lavat, Rodrigo Brand as Alex, Francisco Rocha, Salvador Ibarra, Karolina Gutzce, Cynthia Torash, Armando Villavicencio, Maik Alexandre
