= Kelchie Arizmendi =

Mexican actress

- Born: Kelchie Arizmendi Castellanos; March 6, 1977 (age 49); Mexico City, Mexico
- Occupation: Actress
- Years active: 1998–present
- Relatives: Roxana Castellanos (cousin)

Kelchie Arizmendi (born Kelchie Arizmendi Castellanos on March 6, 1977, in Mexico City, Mexico) is a Mexican actress. In 1998 debut as Panchita in the telenovela Vivo por Elena.

== Biography ==
Arizmendi was born on March 6, 1977, in Mexico City, Mexico. At 18 years old, begin her career as an actress and entering CEA (Centro de Educación Artística de Televisa), where on the basis of effort manages to graduate with successful actors and actresses with Claudia Troyo, Adriana Nieto, Susana González, Arleth Terán and Miguel Ángel Biago. His television debut was at age 21 in a production of Juan Osorio as part of the youth cast in the telenovela Vivo por Elena.

== Filmography ==
Telenovelas, Television
Year	Title	Role	Notes
1998	Vivo por Elena	Panchita "La Risitas"	Supporting role
1998/99	¿Qué nos pasa?	Herself	TV show
1999	Alma rebelde	Graciela	Antagonist
2000	Carita de ángel	Lorena "Lore"	Supporting role
2001	Amigas y rivales	Gisela	Supporting role
2001	Salomé	Natalia	Special appearance
2001/07	Mujer, casos de la vida real	Herself	Various episodes
2002	Así son ellas	Violeta Carmona (young)	Special appearance
2002	Clase 406	Antonia "Toña"	Recurring role
2003	De pocas, pocas pulgas	Cristina	Supporting role
2003	Velo de novia	Patricia "Patty"	Supporting role
2005	Vida tv	Herself	TV show
2005	Los perplejos	Herself	TV show
2005	Contra viento y marea	Fuensanta	Recurring role
2006	La fea más bella	Azáfata	Special appearance
2007	Yo amo a Juan Querendón	Nurse	Recurring role
2007	Destilando Amor	Eduvina	Recurring role
2007	Tormenta en el paraíso	Brisa	Recurring role
2008	Juro Que Te Amo	Irma	Supporting role
2008–present	La rosa de Guadalupe	Various characters	35 Episodes "Volver a verte" (2008) "Reina de Belleza" (2009) "La Menos culpable" (2011) "La Amistad no tiene nombre" (2011) "Una Salida falsa del dolor" (2012) "Niña Problema" (2013) "El Amor nunca tiene la Culpa" (2014) "Un viento en la ventana" (2014) "La Ambición" (2015) "Un Lugar en el Mundo" (2015) "El Principio de la Felicidad" (2016) "Un Doble Perdón" (2017) "Cuéntame un cuento" (2017) "La Luz de una Estrella" (2017) "Lavar la Culpa" (2018) "Hasta Sacarle Brillo" (2018) "Después de la Oscuridad" (2018) "Crecer de Golpe" (2018) "Muñequita de Porcelana" (2019) "Sanar el Corazón" (2019) "El Hombrecito de la Casa" (2019) "Lecciones del Corazón" (2020) "Un Camino Lleno de Espinas" (2021) "La Torre de Cristal" (2021) "Regalo de Reyes" (2021) "La Energía del Sol" (2022) "Ver el Cielo" (2023) "Más que el Sol" (2023) "La Ambición de Juana" (2024) "Luz del Corazón" (2024) "Una Vida Color de Rosa" (2025) "Lo Mejor Para la Familia" (2025) "Juegos de Seducción" (2026) "Shreking: Salir del Pantano de las Apariencias" (2026) "Formar una Familia" (2026)
2010	Llena de amor	Marilda	Recurring role
2011	Ni contigo ni sin ti	Tania	Special appearance
2012	Un refugio para el amor	Norma	Special appearance
2012	Se vale	Herself	TV show
2012/13	Amores verdaderos	Anfitriona	Special appearance
2012/13	Porque el amor manda	Dr. Elbia Muñiz	Special appearance
2013–2024	Como dice el dicho	Various characters	6 Episodes "Quien Hace un Mal, el Suyo Le Viene Atrás" (2013) "Quien no conoce a Dios, donde quiere se anda hincando" (2015) "Celos y Envidia, Quitan al hombre la Vida" (2015) "Más vale Poco y Bueno, que mucho y Malo" (2016) "No quieras correr, antes de saber caminar" (2016) "Poquitos serán los que yerrán queriendo errar" (2017)
2013	Noches con Platanito	Herself	TV show
2013/14	Quiero amarte	Nuria	Recurring role
2014	Esto es Guerra	Herself	TV show
2014	Amordidas	Herself	TV show
2014	Grandes temas de telenovela	Herself	TV show
2014/15	Mi corazón es tuyo	Dr. Sofía Eguiarte Bosch	Special appearance
2014/15	Hasta el fin del mundo	Analía	Recurring role
2016	Sueño de amor	Felicia	Supporting role
2017	El bienamado	Inés	
2017/18	Sin tu mirada	Ximena Roel	
2018	Tenías que ser tú	Maestra Julia	
2020/21	Quererlo todo	Cleo	
2022	Corazón guerrero	Eloísa	
2022/23	Mi secreto	Mercedes "Meche"	
2023/24	Golpe de suerte	Alicia Brito	Recurring role

== Theatre ==
- Panal Gastronómico (2006/07)
- Stand bY Comedy (2013/14)
- Se busca el hombre de mi vida, porque marido ya tuve (2013/16)
- Amoratados (2015)
- Suicidame mi Amor (2017)
