= Isaura Espinoza =

Mexican actress (born 1960)

- Born: Isaura Espinoza; August 25, 1960 (age 64); Piedras Negras, Coahuila, Mexico
- Occupation: Actress
- Years active: 1973–present
- Children: 2
- Parent: Blanca Sánchez (sister-in-law

Isaura Espinoza (born Isaura Espinoza on August 25, 1960, in Piedras Negras, Coahuila, Mexico) is a Mexican actress.

== Early life ==
Espinoza was born on August 25, 1960, in Piedras Negras, Coahuila, Mexico. She is a renowned theater, cinema and TV Mexican Actress.

Espinoza made her debut in Mexican cinema in 1973 and has since starred in 95 films and television series.

She was married with actor Sergio Sánchez, who died on September 16, 2004. With whom she had one son.

== Filmography ==
Year	Title	Role	Notes
1973	El criminal		Film
1979	Una mujer marcada		Recurring role
1980	El Sátiro		Film
1981	Pedro Navaja		Film
1982	Huevos rancheros		Film
1985	Playa prohibida	Carmen	Film
1985	El diablo en persona		Film
1986	Cautiva		Recurring role
1986	Marionetas	Elvira García	Supporting role
1986	Cicatrices del alma	Diana	Recurring role
1987	El rincón de los prodigios		Recurring role
1987	Trágico terremoto en México	Ángela	Film
1989/90	Balada por un amor	Lidia Mercader	Main antagonist
1991	Mujer de cabaret	Elena	Film
1992	Un hombre y una mujer con suerte		Film
1992	La sonrisa del diablo	Leonor	Co-protagonist
1993/94	Corazón salvaje	Amanda Monterrubio vda. de Romero Vargas	Co-protagonist
1994	El alimento del miedo		Film
1994	Salto al vacío		Film
1994	Chespirito	Don Cecilio's niece	Episode: La posada en el hotel
1995	La víbora		Film
1995	La paloma	Teresa Montenegro Tovar de López-Yergo	Supporting role
1996	La antorcha encendida	Micaela	Supporting role
1996	Sentimientos Ajenos	Aurora Mendiola	Supporting role
1997	La jaula de oro	Dolores	Supporting role
1998	El Privilegio de Amar	Herself	Special performance
1998	Gotita de amor	Desdémona Mayoral	Antagonist
1998/99	Ángela	Norma de Molina	Recurring role
1999	Por tu amor	Alejandra Avellán de Robledo	Supporting role
1999/00	Tres mujeres	Diana Carmona	Supporting role
2000	Bienvenida al clan	Isabel	Film
2000/01	Carita de ángel	Genoveva	Supporting role
2001	Diseñador de ambos sexos	Miss Duarte	Episode: La supervivencia del más apto
2001	Mujeres frente al espejo		Theatrical performance
2001/02	Navidad sin fin	Teresa Alarcón	Antagonist; Mini-TV series
2002	El tigre de Santa Julia	Simona Medina1	Film
2003	Niña amada mía	Paz Guzmán de Criollo	Supporting role
2005	Debiera haber obispas		Theatrical performance
2005/06	Alborada	Eusebia	Supporting role
2006	Duelo de Pasiones	Blanca de Bernal	Supporting role
2006/07	Amar sin límites	Isela	Supporting role
2007/08	Lola, érase una vez	Éter Holbein	Supporting role
2008	Fuego en la sangre	Hortensia	Supporting role
2010	Zacatillo, un lugar en tu corazón	Belarmina	Supporting role
2010	La rosa de Guadalupe	Lucía	Episode: El color de la esperanza
2010	En el centro del vientre		Theatrical performance
2011	Una mujer muy música		Theatrical performance
2011	Como dice el dicho	Gabriela Robles	Episode: Del agua mansa
2011	La doble moral		Theatrical performance
2012	La barca del pescador		Theatrical performance
2012	Abismo de pasión	Marú	Supporting role
2013	Baño de mujeres		Theatrical performance
2013	La casa de Bernarda Alba		Theatrical performance
2014	El color de la pasión	Clara Rosales Buena	Recurring role
2015	Volando al sol		Theatrical performance
2018	Hijas de la luna	Madre Superiora	Special performance
2018	Por amar sin ley	Juez Alina Miranda	Special performance
2019	Ringo	Licenciada Avendaño	Special performance

== Awards and nominations ==
Year	Award	Category	Work(s)	Result
2003	Ariel Awards	Best Picture Actress	El tigre de Santa Julia	Nominated
2010	APT Awards	Best Theater Actress	Entre mujeres	Won
2015	Gaviota Awards	Top Characters of Artistic Field	—	Won
