= Sandra Itzel =

Mexican singer & actress (born 1993)

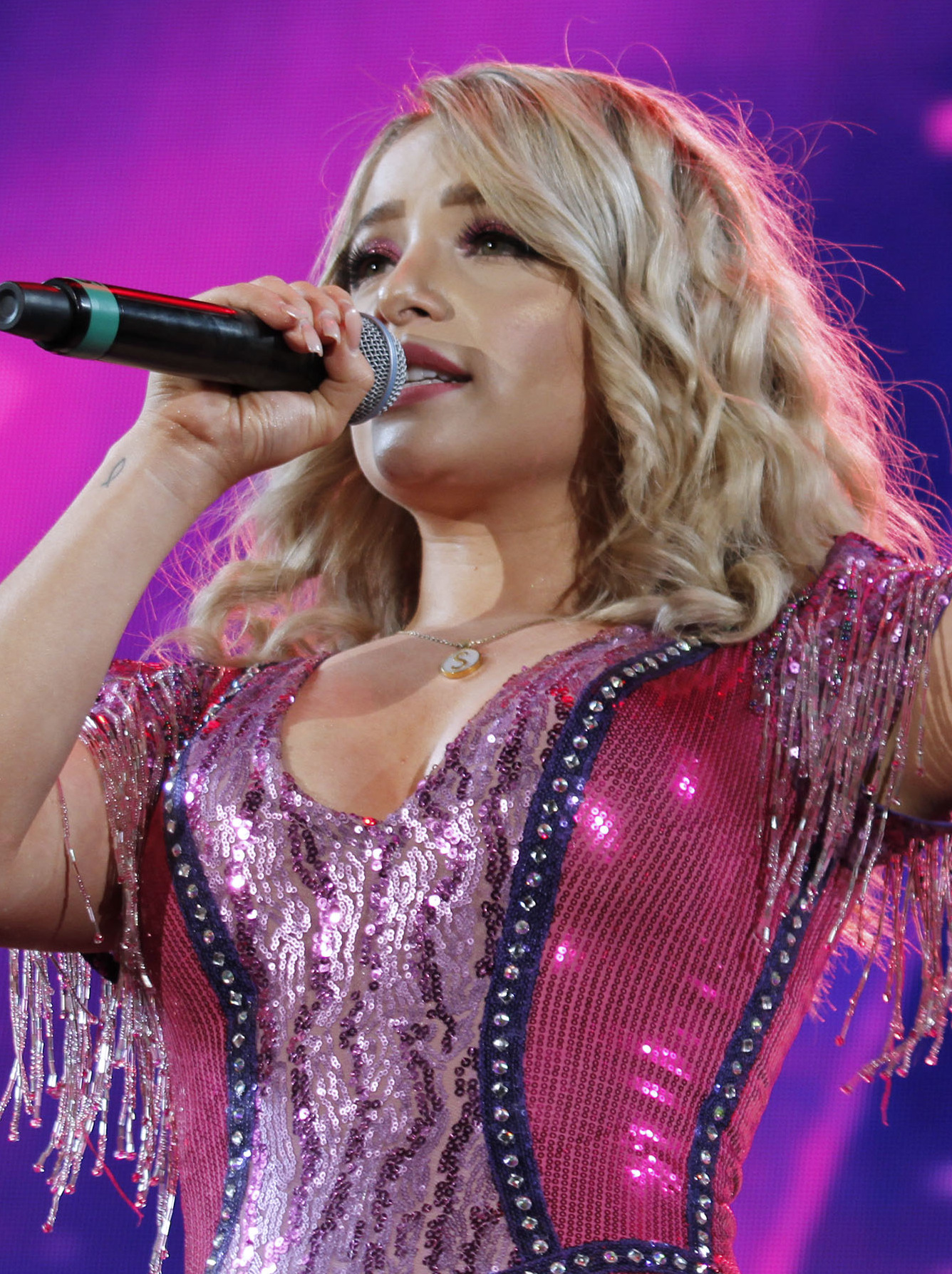
- Itzel in Glorieta de la Palma during the New Year's Eve in 2019
- Born: 31 December 1993 (age 32); Mexico City, Mexico
- Occupations: Actress; singer
- Years active: 1997–present
- Partner: Adrián Di Monte (2013–2023)

Sandra Itzel (born 31 December 1993) is a Mexican actress and singer, best known for her role of Mayrita in the Univision telenovela Gata salvaje (2002–2003). She is currently part of the Colombian band La Sonora Dinamita as a vocalist.

== Career ==
Itzel began her acting career at age 5 on the 1997 Mexican telenovela El privilegio de amar, where she played Dulce. Two years later she entered at the Centro de Educación Artística of Televisa, two months after joining the Televisa academy, Nicandro Díaz chose her to be part of the telenovela Carita de ángel, where she played Chabelita Pérez. Subsequently, Silvia Pinal chose her to appear in an episode of her series Mujer, casos de la vida real, where she played the role of a girl with cerebral palsy. Then made the theater version of Carita de ángel entitled Carita de ángel, las nuevas aventuras en vivo, where she played the villain of the story.

Her rise to fame was in the telenovela filming in Miami, titled Gata salvaje, where she acted alongside Marlene Favela. In this telenovela she played Mayrita, a sweet girl whom her mother does not love. After Gata salvaje, she had a participation in the 2004 telenovela Ángel rebelde. Since then it lasted several years away from the telenovelas. Subsequently, before she turned 18 years old, she joined the cast of the telenovela El Talismán in 2011, and subsequently she appears in the 2013 Univision telenovela entitled Rosario. Her last appearance in a series or long-running telenovela was in the third season of the series El Señor de los Cielos, where she played Luciana Morejón, the president's daughter during that season.

== Personal life ==
She had a relationship with Cuban actor Adrián Di Monte from 2013 until 2023 when they filled for divorce arguing psychological violence from his side against her.

== Filmography ==
Film roles
Year	Title	Roles	Notes
2018	Pizza with Grease	Party Person	Short film

Television roles
Year	Title	Roles	Notes
1997	Mi pequeña traviesa	Edith	
1999	El privilegio de amar	Dulce	7 episodes
2000	Carita de ángel	Chabelita Pérez	
2001	Mujer, casos de la vida real	Girl with cerebral palsy	Episode: "Un país de gente buena"
2002–2003	Gata salvaje	Mayrita Ríos	
2004	Ángel rebelde	Lisette Lezama Covarrubias	
2008–2018	La rosa de Guadalupe	Various roles	10 episodes
2011	Cielo rojo	Young Alma Durán	
2011	Cada quien su santo	Ana	Episode: "Un corte al corazón"
2012	El Talismán	Florencia Negrete	
2013	Rosario	Barbara "Barbie" Montalbán	
2014	Cosita linda	Maya	
2015	¿Quién mató a Patricia Soler?	Lucía Sinisterra	
2015	El Señor de los Cielos	Luciana Morejón	Series regular (season 3); 29 episodes
2019–2021	Esta historia me suena	Jimena Diana	Episode: "17 años" Episode: "Amanecí en tus brazos"
2021	Así se baila	Herself	Contestant
2022	Inseparables: amor al límite	Herself	Season 3
2023	Mira quién baila	Herself	Contestant (season 11)
2024	Sed de venganza	Patricia Flores	
2025	La Granja	Herself	Contestant
2026	La casa de los famosos	Herself	Housemate (season 6)
2026	Juego de villanos	Herself	Contestant
