= Mar Contreras =

Mexican Actress and Singer (born 1981)

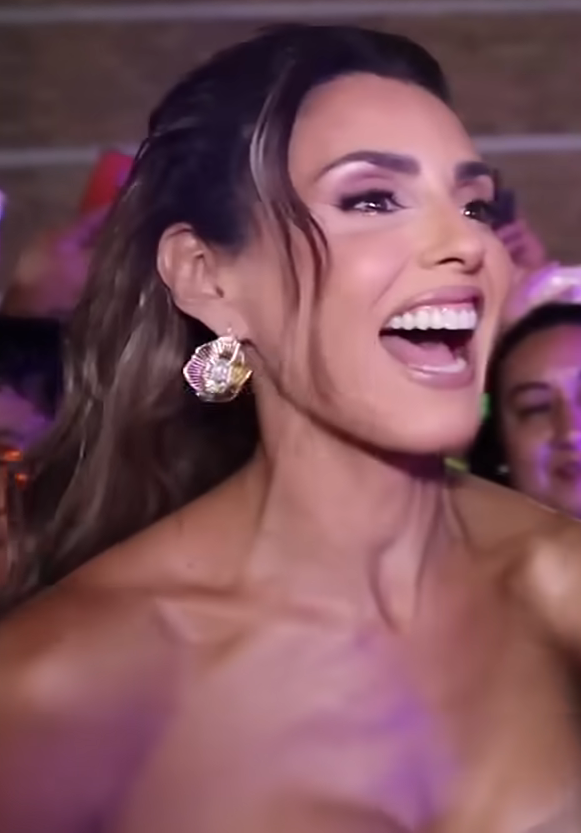
- Born: Marisela Contreras Leyva; February 8, 1981 (age 45); Culiacán, Sinaloa, Mexico
- Occupations: Mexican Actress and Singer
- Years active: 2002, 2007-present

Mar Contreras (born Marisela Contreras Leyva on February 8, 1981) is a Mexican actress and singer.

== Filmography ==
Telenovelas, Series, Films, Theater, TV Show
Year	Title	Role	Notes
2002	Operación Triunfo	Herself	Reality show; 7th place
2007	Hoy No Me Puedo Levantar	María/Ana	Theatrical Performance
2007	Muchachitas como tú	Lorena	Recurring role
2007-08	Tormenta en el paraíso	Dr. Penélope Montalbán	Recurring role
2008	High School Musical: El Desafio Mexico	Luli Casas del Campo	Film
2008	Plantados	Claudia	TV series
2009	¡Qué plantón!	La Rosa	Theatrical Performance
2009-10	Mar de amor	Roselia	Recurring role
2010-11	Teresa	Lucía Álvarez Granados	Recurring role
2011-12	La que no podía amar	Vanesa Galván Villaseñor	Main cast
2012	Se Vale	Herself	TV show
2013	¿Qué le dijiste a Dios?	Marifer	Film
2013	Como dice el dicho	Carla	TV series
2014	Hoy No Me Puedo Levantar	Malena	Theatrical Performance
2015	Lo imperdonable	Nanciyaga	Recurring role
2016-17	Vino el amor	Susan	Main cast
2018-19	Like	Isaura	Recurring role
2019	Por amar sin ley	Lorenza Torres	Guest star; 6 episodes
2019	Nosotros los guapos	Ana	Episode: "Las inquilinas"
2019-21	Esta historia me suena	María Diana	Episode: "Cruz de navajas" Episode: "El Diablo"
2021	Un día para vivir	Gloria	Episode: "El juez"
2022-23	Cabo	Vanessa Noriega	Main cast
2023	¿Tú crees?	Saleswoman	Episode: "Te demuestro que demuestro mejor lo que demuestro"
2025	La casa de los famosos México	Herself	Reality show; 5th place
2026	Tierra de amor y coraje	Estrella Barrios	Main cast

== Discography ==
- Sólo 5

== Awards ==
=== Diosas de Plata Awards ===
Year	Category	Film	Result
2015	Best Supporting Actress	¿Qué le dijiste a Dios?	Winner
