= Juan Ángel Esparza =

Mexican actor (born 1973)

- Born: May 6, 1973 (age 52); Montemorelos, Nuevo León, Mexico
- Occupation: Actor
- Years active: 1992–present

Juan Ángel Esparza (born May 6, 1973, in Montemorelos, Nuevo León, Mexico) is a Mexican actor.

Esparza debuted as an actor in 1992 on the telenovela Las secretas intenciones and continued with others such as Rencor apasionado, Tres mujeres, Amigas y rivales, Las vías del amor and Cuidado con el ángel.

He has also participated in series such as Bienes raíces, Central de Abasto, Mujer, casos de la vida real and Tiempo final.

== Filmography ==
Year	Title	Role	Notes
1992	Las secretas intenciones	Guillermo	Supporting role
1997	Salud, dinero y amor	Eugenio	Recurring role
1997/06	Mujer, casos de la vida real		TV-Series; 18 Episodes
1998	Rencor apasionado	Julio Rangel Rivera	Recurring role
1999	Una boda	Simón	Film
1999	La mirada de la ausencia		Film
1999	La segunda noche	Mauricio	Film
1999/00	Tres mujeres	Rodrigo Balmori	Recurring role
2001	El gavilán de la sierra	Gabriel Nevárez	Film
2001	Amigas y rivales	Francisco	Recurring role
2002	El tigre de Santa Julia	Zepeda	Film
2002/03	Las vías del amor	Carlos Velázquez	Supporting role
2004	El mago	Carlos	Film
2004	Cero y van 4	Chalo "El Torzón"	Film
2004	Te apuesto y te gano		Film
2004/05	Apuesta por un amor	Samuel Cruz	Recurring role
2004/05	Inocente de ti	Daniel Hernández	Recurring role
2005	La última noche		Film
2005/06	Peregrina	Francisco	Recurring role
2006	Sexo, amor y otras perversiones	Carlos	Film
2006	Bienvenido paisano	Manuel	Film
2006	Vecinos		Film
2007	El amor es un breve instante de esplendor que ocurre entre el anhelo y la ausencia		Film
2008	En la luz del sol brillante		Film
2008	El comienzo del fin		Film
2008	Central de Abasto		TV-Series
2008/09	Cuidado con el ángel	Reynaldo Iturbe	Special appearance
2009	Tiempo final	Agent	TV-series
2009	Verano de amor	Luis Armendariz	Recurring role
2009/10	Mar de amor	Osvaldo Ascanio	Supporting role
2010	Cuando me enamoro	Isidro del Valle (young)	Special appearance
2010/11	Bienes raíces	Arturo	TV-series
2011	Rafaela	Carlos Luis Fernández	Supporting role
2011/23	Como dice el dicho	Various characters	TV-series
2012	Por ella soy Eva	Rodrigo Valenzuela	Recurring role
2012/13	Kipatla	Professor Jacinto	TV-series
2013	La rosa de Guadalupe	Francisco	TV-series; Episode "Como en las Películas"
2013	Corazón indomable	José Antonio García	Antagonist
2014	La gata	Padre Rivas	Recurring role
2015	Lo imperdonable	Manuel Sánchez Álvarez	Antagonist
2016	Mujeres de negro	Víctor Martínez/Víctor Palazuelos	Supporting role
2017	Mi adorable maldición	Jerónimo Ríos	Supporting role
2017/19	Sin senos sí hay paraíso	Carmelo Villa	Recurring role
2020/21	Quererlo todo	Padre Gabriel	Recurring role
2024	Mujeres asesinas	Nelson	Episode: "Virginia"
2024/25	Amor amargo	Julio Martínez	Supporting role
2026	Corazón de oro	Victor	
