= Paty Díaz =

Mexican actress and model

- Born: Patricia Díaz; 17 March 1974 (age 52); San Luis Río Colorado, Sonora, Mexico
- Occupations: Actress; model
- Years active: 1995–present
- Spouse: Guillermo Peña
- Children: Guillermo Peña Díaz

Patricia Díaz (born 17 March 1974), known professionally as Paty Díaz, is a Mexican actress and model. She is known for her portrayal of Lalita in the telenovela, La usurpadora (1998).

== Career ==
Díaz was born on 17 March 1974 in San Luis Río Colorado, Sonora, and spent her childhood in San Juan Ixtayopan, Tláhuac, in southeastern Mexico City, where her father is from. She studied at Televisa's Centro de Educación Artística (CEA), graduating in 1995. She made her telenovela debut that same year, aged 21, with a supporting role in La Dueña.

== Filmography ==
Telenovelas
Year	Title	Role	Notes
1995	La Dueña	Blanquita López	Supporting role
1996–97	Luz Clarita	Natalia	Main role
1998	La usurpadora	Lalita Pérez	Supporting role
1998	Gotita de amor	Lorena	Supporting role
1999	Rosalinda	Clara "Clarita" Martínez	Supporting role
2000	Ramona	Carmen	Supporting role
2000–01	Carita de ángel	Sister Clementina	Supporting role
2001–02	Salomé	Marta	Supporting role
2004	Rubí	Cristina Pérez Ochoa	Supporting role
2005–06	Barrera de amor	Nuria de Romero	Supporting role
2006–07	La fea más bella	Secretary	Guest role
2006–07	Mundo de fieras	Belén	Supporting role
2008–09	En nombre del amor	Natalia Ugarte de Iparraguirre	Supporting role
2009–10	Los exitosos Pérez	Amanda Olivera	Supporting role
2011–12	La que no podía amar	Macaria de Hernández	Supporting role
2012–13	Qué bonito amor	Mirna Reynoso	Supporting role
2014–15	Como dice el dicho	Elena / Mirna	Guest role
2015	Lo imperdonable	Raymunda Alvarez	Supporting role
2017	Mi adorable maldición	Brigida Sanchez vda. de Johnson	Supporting role
2018	Por amar sin ley	Sara Hernández	Guest role
2019-20	Soltero con hijas	Leona Lenteja	Supporting role
2023	Nadie como tú	Eréndira Santana García	Main role
2025	Me atrevo a amarte	Carmen García	
