= Ricardo Franco (Mexican actor) =

Mexican television actor

- Born: September 4, 1980 (age 45); Aguascalientes, Mexico
- Occupation: Actor
- Years active: 2008-present

Ricardo Franco (born September 4, 1980, in Aguascalientes, Mexico), is a Mexican television actor.

== Career ==
He graduated from the Televisa Center for Artistic Education (CEA). He made his small screen debut in 2008, appearing in several episodes of the one-woman program La rosa de Guadalupe and with a brief appearance on the soap opera Querida enemiga. In 2009, he appeared in the series Mujeres asesinas and the soap opera Mi pecado, and in 2010, he appeared in Llena de amor.

In 2011, the production company MaPat gave him the opportunity to star in the soap opera Ni contigo ni sin ti under the name José Carlos.

A year later, he participated in the soap opera Amor bravío alongside Silvia Navarro and Cristián de la Fuente.

== Filmography ==
=== Television ===
Year	Title	Role	Notes
2008	La rosa de Guadalupe	Franco / Flavio	Episode: "Una manita de gato" Episode: "La fuerza del corazón"
2008	Querida enemiga	Fernando	
2009	Mi pecado	Miguel	"Acta de matrimonio" (Season 1, Episode 60) "Final" (Season 1, Episode 110)
2009-2010	Mujeres asesinas	Teniente Morán	Main cast; 20 episodes
2010	Llena de amor	Alfredo	Recurring role
2011	Ni contigo ni sin ti	José Carlos Rivas Olmedo	Main cast
2012	Amor bravío	Rodolfo	Supporting role
2013	Corazón indomable	Eduardo Quiroga	Supporting role
2013-2014	Quiero amarte	Salvador	Supporting role
2014	La Gata	Edgar Suárez	Recurring role
2015	Que te perdone Dios	Gerardo López Guerra	Guest role
2015	Lo imperdonable	Julio	Supporting role
2015	Simplemente María	Laureano	Supporting role
2016	Mujeres de negro	Rico	Supporting role
2017	Mi adorable maldición	Marco	Recurring role
2018	Silvia Pinal, frente a ti	Jorge Negrete	Main cast
2021–2022	Mi fortuna es amarte	Félix Núñez	Supporting role
2022	Amor dividido	Ramiro Salcedo	Supporting role
2023–2024	Nadie como tú	Tristán Gamero	
2024–2025	Amor amargo	Joaquín Ardila	
