= Jade Fraser =

Mexican actress

- Born: January 8, 1993 (age 32); Guadalajara, Jalisco, Mexico
- Occupation: Actress
- Years active: 2010–present

Jade Fraser (born January 8, 1993) is a Mexican actress, who first gained recognition for her role in the telenovela Por Siempre mi Amor in 2013. Fraser has also participated in several television series and telenovelas in Mexico.

== Early life ==
She has one older sister named Anahi who is also an actress. At 17 years old, she was accepted to the Centro de Educación Artística, a drama school run by Televisa, in Mexico City. She later graduated after completing a three-year course. She currently resides in Mexico City. Fraser was an active asset in Hashomer Hatzair Mexico

== Career ==
Fraser had a small role in the film Dragonball Evolution, when she was 13 years old. She also began auditioning for television commercials and appeared in an advertisement for candy. In 2010, during her first year at Centro de Educación Artística, she was successfully cast as Ximena, in the youth-targeted telenovela Niña de mi Corazón starring Paulina Goto. The telenovela premiered in Mexico on March 8, 2010. Since 2010, she has participated in different Mexican telenovelas and television series such as La Rosa de Guadalupe and Como dice el dicho. In 2012 and 2013, she earned a supporting role in the telenovela Abismo de pasión, and had a small role in Amores Verdaderos.

In March 2014, she auditioned for the lead role as the younger sister of a wealthy chocolate factory owner in the telenovela, Hasta el fin del mundo. Her participation in the telenovela was later confirmed in May 2014. She reportedly won the role after actress Danna Paola, who was previously tied to the project, dropped out. Hasta el fin del mundo began production in July 2014 in Mexico City. The telenovela, which marks Fraser's first starring role, premiered on August 18, 2014 .

In May 2015, she began performing in the original play, Gélidas caricias as Susana. The play premiered on May 21, 2015, in Mexico City for Teatro en Corto and completed its first season on June 28, 2015. The play began its second season in fall of 2015. In September 2015, Fraser joined the cast of the romantic-comedy telenovela, A que no me dejas. The second half of the telenovela was filmed on location in Cancún. Fraser also had a small role in the Mexican romantic-comedy film Busco novio para mi novia.

In early 2016, she was cast as princess Jazmín in the musical Aladino y la lámpara maravillosa, the Spanish-language version of Aladdin. The play runs Sunday mornings and afternoons in Mexico City at Teatro San Jerónimo Independencia. In January 2016, Fraser began filming Yago, a television drama series, in Mexico City. The show, which consists of 65 episodes, is scheduled to air on Univision in the U.S. on May 2, 2016. A later air date for Mexico has not yet been determined.

=== Other ventures ===
Fraser participated in the Expo Fest 15, a gala featuring a quinceañera-themed fashion show in 2014 and 2015. She has also modeled clothing for Cklass for the Spring 2015 collection.

== Filmography ==
Film roles
| Year | Title | Roles | Notes |
|---|---|---|---|
| 2009 | Dragonball Evolution | Cameo appearance | Uncredited |
| 2016 | Busco novio para mi novia | Sol | |

=== Television ===
Television roles
| Year | Title | Roles | Notes |
|---|---|---|---|
| 2010 | Niña de mi corazón | Ximena Arrioja | Main cast |
| 2012–16 | Como dice el dicho | Various roles | 8 episodes |
| 2012 | Abismo de pasión | Sabrina Tovar | Series regular; 80 episodes |
| 2013 | Amores verdaderos | Fátima | 3 episodes |
| 2013 | Cásate conmigo, mi amor | Anita | |
| 2013 | La rosa de Guadalupe | Érika / Elena | Episode: "Tenerte entre mis brazos" |
| 2013–2014 | Por siempre mi amor | Iliana | Series regular; 94 episodes |
| 2014–2015 | Hasta el fin del mundo | Daniela | Main role; 186 episodes |
| 2015–2016 | A que no me dejas | Carolina | Main role (season 2); 54 episodes |
| 2016 | Yago | Julia | Main role; 42 episodes |
| 2017–2019 | Mi marido tiene familia | Linda Córcega | Main role (seasons 1–2); 248 episodes |
| 2018 | Por amar sin ley | Rocío | 6 episodes |
| 2018 | Hijas de la luna | Juana Soledad | Main role; 82 episodes |
| 2020 | Vencer el miedo | Cristina Durán | Main role |
| 2021 | 40 y 20 | Melina | Episode: "Amores que matan, nunca mueren" |
| 2022 | El último rey | Young Cuquita | Main role |
| 2022 | Esta historia me suena | Liliana | Episode: "Una hora más" |
| 2022 | Mujeres asesinas | Ximena | Episode: "Llámame Paula" |

=== Theater ===
| Year | Title | Role |
|---|---|---|
| 2015 | Gélidas caricias | Susana |
| 2016 | Aladino y la lámpara maravillosa | Princess Jazmín |
