= Fran Meric =

Mexican actress, host and model

- Born: Francoise Lorraine Meric Troncoso; August 1, 1981 (age 45); Mexico City

Fran Meric is a Mexican actress, host and model. She was born in Veracruz, but moved to Mexico City when she was 11 years old. She studied acting in Centro de Formacion Actoral of TV Azteca.

== Personal life ==
She had a long relationship with Daniel Bisogno. She dated Leonardo Garcia before dating Raul Sandoval in 2011.

== Filmography ==
=== TV ===
- Relatos de Mujeres (2018) .... Katy Jurado
- Muy padres .... Sofía Urrutia Gómez
- Secretos de Familia .... Sandra Ventura
- Los Rey (2012) .... Jenny Laborde
- A Corazón Abierto (2011) .... Cristina Solorzano
- Asgaard (2009) .... Laya
- Cambio de vida (2008) .... Cameo (the model)
- La otra mitad del sol .... Isabel Medina

=== Host ===
- Por fin el fin (2007)
- Tempranito (1998)
