= Carita de ángel =

Mexican children's and family telenovela

- Genre: Telenovela
- Created by: Kary Fajer
- Story by: Abel Santa Cruz
- Directed by: Lili Garza; Marta Luna; Juan Carlos Muñoz
- Starring: Lisette Morelos; Miguel de León; Libertad Lamarque; Daniela Aedo; Nora Salinas
- Theme music composer: María Teresa Bojalil
- Opening theme: "Carita de ángel" performed by Tatiana
- Ending theme: "Carita de ángel 2" performed by Daniela Aedo
- Composers: Paco Navarrete; Rafa Rodríguez
- Country of origin: Mexico
- Original language: Spanish
- No. of episodes: 175

Production
- Executive producer: Nicandro Díaz González
- Producers: Pablo Noceda; Georgina Castro
- Production locations: Mexico City, Mexico
- Cinematography: Rubén Barajas; Héctor Márquez; Ernesto Arreola
- Editors: Claudio González; Susana Valencia
- Camera setup: Multi-camera
- Running time: 60 minutes
- Production company: Televisa

Original release
- Network: Canal de las Estrellas
- Release: June 19, 2000 – March 16, 2001

Related
- Carinha de Anjo

Carita de ángel (English title: Little Angel Face) is a Mexican children's telenovela produced by Nicandro Díaz González for Televisa. It aired from June 19, 2000, to March 16, 2001. It is a remake of the telenovela Papa Corazon, which also was adapted for Mundo de juguete. The series stars Lisette Morelos, Miguel de León, Libertad Lamarque, Daniela Aedo and Nora Salinas. Libertad Lamarque died during the filming of this telenovela and was replaced by Silvia Pinal. In the United States, Univision aired Caríta de ángel from March 5, 2001 to November 15, 2001.

== Plot ==
Dulce María Larios is a kindhearted, compassionate and imaginative 5-year-old girl who has recently lost her mother in a tragic skydiving accident. Reeling from the loss of his wife, Dulce María's father, Luciano, sinks into depression and lives abroad for a few years, leaving his daughter and loved ones behind. Dulce María is enrolled in an all-girls Catholic boarding school known as "Reina de America" (Queen of America) to be taken care of by the nuns and her uncle Gabriel, who is a priest.

The only relative that visits her is her Aunt Estefania, whom she affectionately calls "Tía Pelucas" (Auntie Wigs) as she wears a large and varied set of colorful wigs, instead of showing her real hair. The nuns, for the most part, adore Dulce María, in particular the Sisters Cecilia and Fortunata, who are accomplices in all of her various antics. These antics frequently irk Luciano but are tolerated by the headmistress, the tender and kindly Mother Superior.

Dulce María also has a secret place in the school known as "The old little room." There, her playful imagination comes to life, where she speaks with the spirit of her mother (Angelica) who dispenses advice to her and tells her wonderful stories. Things brighten up for Dulce María when, after a two-year absence, Luciano announces his return to Mexico. But the initial joy fades when her dad arrives with Nicole, a domineering and self-centered woman who is also Luciano's fiancée. Her only reason for being with Luciano is for his money, and she views Dulce Maria as a mere nuisance.

Nicole's plan is to get Luciano's daughter out of her way so she can have him all to herself. Sensing that her father will not be happy being married to Nicole, and not wanting to lose her father's affection, Dulce María sets out to sabotage the relationship and endear her father to Sister Cecilia, who is more of a mother figure than Nicole.

Luciano slowly realizes that he does not love Nicole, while at the same time, he begins feeling a growing attraction to Cecilia. She, in turn, realizes that her religious vocation begins to waver once she realizes that she is in love with Luciano and must decide whether to take her religious vows or give them up and listen to her heart.

== Cast ==
- Daniela Aedo as Dulce María Larios Valle
- Lisette Morelos as Cecilia Santos de Larios/Sister Cecilia
- Miguel de León as Luciano Larios Rocha
- Libertad Lamarque as Mother Superior Piedad de la luz
- Silvia Pinal as Reverend Lucía
- Nora Salinas as Estefanía Larios de Gamboa "Aunt Wigs"
- Marisol Santacruz as Angélica Valle de Larios
- Manuel Saval as Father Gabriel Larios Rocha
- Adriana Acosta as Sister Fortunata Rico
- Juan Pablo Gamboa as Noé Gamboa
- Polo Ortín as Silvestre Núñez
- Ana Patricia Rojo as Nicole Romero Medrano
- Mariana Ávila as Cassandra Gamboa Campos
- Paty Díaz as Sister Clementina
- Joaquín Cordero as Don Adolfo Valle
- Ana Luisa Peluffo as Aída Medrano Vda. de Romero
- Arena Ibarra as Lluvia Amezcua
- Nancy Patiño as Alfonsina Núñez
- Priscila Herrera as Bárbara Guerra
- Andrea Soberón as Frida Iturbe
- Mario Thadeo as Centavito
- Iliana Montserrat as Juanita Pérez
- Génesis Romo as Anita Pérez
- Raúl Padilla "Chóforo" as Pascual Huerta
- Verónica Macías as Verónica Medina Rico
- Héctor Suárez Gomis as Omar Gasca
- Mariagna Prats as Francesca Rossi
- Estrella Lugo as Selene Gallardo
- Marga López as Mother General Asunción de la Luz
- Juan Carlos Serrán as Rómulo Rossi
- Ingrid Martz as Doménica Rossi
- José María Torre as Leonel
- Carmen Amezcua as Clarissa Santos Dorantes de Valadez
- Alejandro Ruiz as Homero Anaya Rubalcaba
- Francisco Avendaño as Dr. Andrés Urquiza
- Rosita Pelayo as Fedora Aldama
- Roberto Palazuelos as Flavio Romero Medrano
- Janet Ruiz as Águeda
- Teo Tapia as Perpetuo Chacón
- Natasha Dupeyrón as Mariana
- Andrea Lagunes as Irma Valadez Santos
- Ana Lobo as Chiripa (voice)
- Karla Kegel as Shula
- Paola Kegel as Sheila
- Isaura Espinoza as Genoveva
- Alejandro de la Madrid as Jordi
- Alejandra Procuna as Morelba
- Carlos Espejel as Solovino (voice)
- Marisol Centeno as Sonia Gómez
- Gabriela Platas as Soraya
- Mauricio Aspe as Saturno
- Norma Herrera as Paulina Valle
- Servando Manzetti as Lic. Cristóbal Valadez
- Kelchie Arizmendi as Lorena "Lore"
- Alfonso Iturralde as Dr. Luis Fragoso
- Roberto "Flaco" Guzmán as Filemón
- Alejandro Tommasi as Jaime Alberto
- Yolanda Ventura as Julieta
- Mónica Dossetti as Lorena Campos
- Rafael Rojas as Gaspar
- Roberto Tello as Tranquilino
- David Ostrosky as Dr. Velasco
- Irma Lozano as Altagracia Lemus Vda. de Rivera
- Alexis Ayala as Leonardo Larios
- Juan Carlos Casasola as Jairo
- Raquel Morell as Minerva Gamboa de Alvarado
- Vanessa Guzmán as Gilda Esparza
- Gabriel Soto as Rogelio Alvarado Gamboa
- Aurora Molina as Canuta
- César Castro as Regino
- Jaime Garza as Rutilio
- José Suárez as Raymundo
- Julio Vega as Fidelio
- Luis Couturier as Dr. Heredia
- Cristine Aguinaga as Katty
- Génesis Bages as Daniela (at Institute Estudillo)
- Beatriz Sheridan (Note: also acted as the Stage Director of initial episodes) as Mrs. Estudillo
- Lupita Lara as Magdalena
- Juan Soler as Marcos
- Stephen Franco as Fausto
- Kristoff as Zeno
- Sergio Ramos as Agent Elizondo
- Sara Luz as Nieves
- Adalberto Martínez "Spring" as Hippolytus
- Erika Buenfil as Policarpia "Poly" Zambrano
- Arturo Peniche as Dr. Montemayor
- Pedro Weber "Chatanuga" as Antonio
- Rafael del Villar as Vladimir
- Manola Diez as Carmina
- Khotan as Alexis
- Cecilia Gabriela as Victoria Torres de Montesinos
- Ariel López Padilla as Adrian
- Gustavo Rojo as Father Cosme
- Oscar Morelli as Dr. Villanueva
- Manuel "Flaco" Ibáñez as Candido
- Marco Uriel as Gerardo Montesinos
- Humberto Elizondo as Solomon
- Alejandro Aragón as Dionisio
- Diana Osorio as Lupita
- Eugenio Derbez as The Thousand Faces
- Javier Herranz as Achilles
- Isabel Martínez "La Stonechat" as Aunt Domitila
- Renata Flores as Inspector Pantaleona Malacara
- Jorge van Rankin as Thaddeus
- Salim Rubiales as Ramiro
- Socorro Bonilla as Donna Cruz
- María Eugenia Ríos as Esperanza
- Antonio de la Vega as Franco
- Guillermo Rivas as Edgar
- Maricarmen Vela as Silvina
- César Bono as Toribio
- Vilma Traca as Tonita
- Susana Lozano as Elvira
- Octavio Menduet as Colonel
- Marlene Favela as Amber Ferrer
- Jorge Arvizu "El Tata" as Anastasio
- Katie Barberi as Noelia
- Diego Barquinero as Clown Diegans
- José Luis Cordero "Pocholo" as Facundo
- Rebeca Mankita as Ivory de los Cobos
- Sergio Miguel as Jimmy
- Aline O'Farrill as Genoa
- Héctor Parra as Mr. Iturbe
- Oscar Traven as Ernesto Tirado
- Sandra Itzel as Chabelita
- Nora Velasquez as Ms. Malpica
- Esperanza Rendón as Elba
- Eugenia Avendaño as Mrs. Becerra
- Dolores Solomon "Bodokito" as Mrs. Parker
- Sonia Velestri as Carolina
- Luis Xavier as Dr. Altamirano
- Rafael Amador as Dr. Lake
- Anabel Gutiérrez as Beggar
- Eva Calvo as Gatinea
- Beatriz Cecilia as Novice
- Irma Torres as Homemade
- Oscar Bonfiglio as Augustine
- Alberto Angel "El Cuervo" as Fidel
- Martin Rojas as Pancho
- Gisella Aboumrad as Matlida
- Cristiane Aguinaga as Katia
- Litzy as Herself
- Baltazar Oviedo as Cleófas
- Yurem Rojas as Edgar
- Maki as Samantha
- Emília Carranza as Sra. Zamora
- Ivette Proal as Griselda
- Archie Lafranco as Baldomero
- Miguel Michel Anaya as Aberlardo
