= Daniela Aedo =

Mexican actress (born 1995)

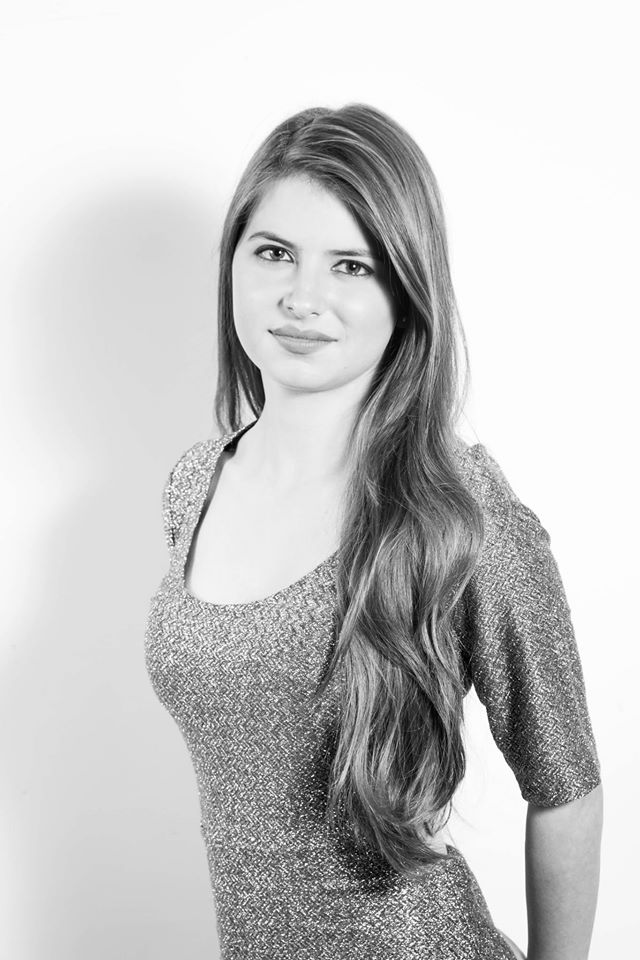
- Born: Daniela Aedo Santana; February 12, 1995 (age 31); Mexico City, Mexico
- Occupation: Actress
- Years active: 1999–present

Daniela Aedo Santana (born February 12, 1995) is a Mexican actress.

== Career ==
=== Acting ===
In 1999, at the age of four, she auditioned to participate in a children's telenovela and was chosen to star in Carita de angel. In 2000, she made an appearance in the telenovela Dare to forget me, in the role of Andrea (girl). In 2002, she participated in her second successful children's telenovela, called ¡Vivan los Niños! in the Nicandro Díaz production, alongside Andrea Legarreta. In 2004, she starred in the telenovela Contra Viento y Marea, where she once again played the role of Sandra (girl). Then, after a long period of inactivity, she returned to soap operas in 2008, appearing in My Sin.

=== Music ===
Aedo is a guitarist, singer and songwriter. In 2013 she was accepted to Berklee College of Music.

She had two concerts in Latin America, one in Mexico City, at the Bataclán forum, and another in Buenos Aires, Argentina, at Mediterránea Café Teatro, presenting original songs from her next album, and presenting her next single. On her YouTube channel, she has talked about her artistic career and her musical studies.

Due to the COVID-19 pandemic, she confined her concerts to her YouTube channel.

== Filmography ==
Telenovelas and films
Year	Title	Role	Notes
1998	Vivo Por Elena	Isabel	Guest star
2000-01	Carita de ángel	Dulce María Larios Valle	Main role
2001	Atrévete a Olvidarme	Child Andrea Rosales	Guest star
2002-03	¡Vivan los niños!	Marisol Luna	Main role
2003-05	Mujer, casos de la vida real		3 episodes
2005	Contra viento y marea	Child Sandra Serrano Rudell	Guest star
2005	LuLu	Verónica "Vero" Vásquez	
2005-06	Plaza Sésamo	Dany	Various Episodes
2006	La familia P. Luche	Maite	TV series
2006	Monster House	Eliza	
2009	Mi pecado	Child Lucrecia Córdoba Pedraza	Guest star
2018	Como dice el dicho	Elisa	Episode: "A la pereza persigue la pobreza"
2018	The Nutcracker and the Four Realms	Louise Stahlbaum	Spanish dub
2019	Esta historia me suena	Mireya	Episode: "Adelante corazón"
2024	Papás por conveniencia	Herself	Guest star
2026	Una familia complicada	Claudia	

== Discography ==
- Carita de ángel (2000)
- ¡Vivan los niños! (2002)

== Awards and nominations ==
Year	Award	Category	Telenovela	Result
2002	Premios INTE	Child Talent	Carita de Ángel	Won
2003	Premios INTE	Child Talent	¡Vivan los niños!	Won
