= Jaime Garza (actor) =

Mexican actor (1954–2021)

- Born: Jaime Francisco Garza Alardín; January 28, 1954; Monterrey, Nuevo León, Mexico
- Died: May 14, 2021 (aged 67); Mexico City, Mexico
- Occupation: Actor
- Years active: 1970–2021
- Known for: Pacto de amor (1977); Destilando Amor (2007)
- Spouse: Natalia Toledo (m. 1995)
- Partner: Viridiana Alatriste (1978–1982)
- Children: 2
- Mother: Carmen Alardín

Jaime Francisco Garza Alardín (January 28, 1954 – May 14, 2021), known professionally as Jaime Garza, was a Mexican actor.

== Early life ==
Garza was the son of journalist Ramiro Garza and the poet Carmen Alardín, brother of actress Ana Silvia Garza, and uncle to the actress and singer Mariana Garza. He studied acting at the National Autonomous University of Mexico (Universidad Nacional Autónoma de México). He made his acting debut in 1973 on the Mexican children's program Plaza Sésamo, and his first telenovela was Pacto de amor in 1977.

== Personal life ==
In 1982 his girlfriend, Viridiana Alatriste Pinal died in an automobile accident after a party at Garza's house in Mexico City on October 25, 1982. In 2010 he suffered a stroke that required surgery, and in 2014, Garza lost his right leg due to complications from diabetes. Garza died in May 2021 in Mexico City.

== Filmography ==
=== Telenovelas ===
Year	Title	Role	Notes	Ref.
2017	El bienamado	Apolo		
2012	Como dice el dicho	Dominico		
2010	Niña de mi corazón	Dionisio Bravo		
2009	Mañana es para siempre	Silvestre Tinoco		
2007	Destilando Amor	Román Quijano		
2005	Mujer, casos de la vida real			
2003	Como Dios manda	Señor Fergus		
2002	¡Vivan los niños!	Juan Sánchez		
2001	Salomé	Hipólito		
2000	Carita de ángel	Rutilio Pérez		
1998	¿Qué nos pasa?			
1998	Gotita de amor	Detective Romo		
1998	La usurpadora	Comandante Merino		
1998	JAG (Ep. 14.3)	Announcer	Episode 14.3	
1996	Morir dos veces	Sergio Terán		
1996	Canción de amor	Ernesto #2		
1994	El vuelo del águila	Ricardo Flores Magón		
1992	La sonrisa del diablo	Victor		
1989	El cristal empañado	Jacinto		
1989	Simplemente María	Victor Carreño		
1988	Rosa salvaje	Ernesto Rojas		
1985	Vivir un poco	Tintoretto Fernández		
1984	Guadalupe	Francisco Javier/Raúl		
1982	Bianca Vidal	Mauricio Fonseca		
1981	Cachún cachún ra ra!	El Pelos/Greñas		
1979	Añoranza			
1981	Caminemos	Julio		
1978	La hora del silencio	El Millones		
1972	Plaza Sésamo	Jaime		

=== Film ===
Year	Title	Role	Ref.
2016	Charity	José Luís	
1996	El amor de tu vida S.A.	Marcelo	
1992	Delicuentes de lujo	Chanito	
1992	Jefe de vigilancia		
1991	Pánico		
1991	La metralleta infernal		
1989	The Bloody Monks	Ricardo (as James Garnett)	
1988	Los camaroneros		
1988	El solitario indomable	Hijo de Don Samuel	
1988	Reto a la vida	Pepe Muñoz	
1987	Dinastia sangrienta		
1986	Contrabando y muerte		
1985	Forbidden Beach	Andres	
1985	The Falcon and the Snowman	Raul	
1985	Tiempo de lobos		
1984	Prohibido amar en Nueva York		
1984	Noche de carnaval	Amigo de Pepe	
1983	Los dos carnales	Francisco	
1982	Missing	Young man/stadium	
1981	Las piernas del millón		
1981	Hacer un guion		
1981	El gran perro muerto	Chente	
1981	Johnny Chicano	Pepe Domínguez	
1980	La madre		
1980	Navajeros	El Butano	
1979	Cualquier Cosa		
1979	Naná	Coquito	
1977	Pacto de amor		
1976	Canoa: A Shameful Memory	Roberto	

== Awards and nominations ==
Year		Category	Title	Result	Ref.
1986	TVyNovelas Award for Best Young Lead Actor	Best Young Lead Actor	Vivir un poco	Nominated	
1985	TVyNovelas Award for Best Young Lead Actor	Best Young Lead Actor	Guadalupe	Nominated	
