= Rafael del Villar =

Mexican actor

- Born: April 11, 1962 (age 63); Mexico City, Mexico
- Occupation: Actor
- Years active: 1982–present

Rafael del Villar (born April 11, 1962, in Mexico City, Mexico) is a Mexican actor.

== Life ==
He began his career in telenovela Chispita in 1983. del Villar has acted in several telenovelas.

== Filmography ==
Year	Title	Role	Notes
1982	Chispita		Recurring role
1984	Los años felices	Ítalo	Supporting role
1986	Cicatrices del alma	Marco	Supporting role
1986	Pobre juventud		Recurring role
1987/88	Rosa salvaje	Ramón Valadez	Recurring role
1988	Dos vidas	Luis Carlos	Supporting role
1989/90	Simplemente María	Jacinto López	Recurring role
1991	La pícara soñadora	Lic. Argüeyo	Recurring role
1991	Madres egoístas	Héctor Cruz	Supporting role
1992	El abuelo y yo	Ponciano	Recurring role
1992	Carrusel de las Américas	Fernando Rico	Supporting role
1992	María Mercedes	Ricardo	Recurring role
1994	Marimar	Esteban/Leonardo Alcázar	Recurring role
1995/96	María la del barrio	Dr. Torres	Special appearance
1995/06	Mujer, Casos de la Vida Real		13 episodes
1996	Confidente de secundaria	Ricardo	Recurring role
1996	La sombra del otro	Marcos Beltrán	Recurring role
1997	Esmeralda	Sebastián Robles-Gil	Supporting role
1998	Gotita de amor	Gilberto Robles	Supporting role
1999	El niño que vino del mar	Marco	Supporting role
1999	Infierno en el paraíso	Lic. Francisco Villanueva	Special appearance
1999/00	Cuento de Navidad		Special appearance
1999/00	Tres mujeres	Eduardo	Recurring role
2000/01	Carita de ángel	Vladimir	Recurring role
2000/01	Por un beso	Félix	Recurring role
2001	Aventuras en el tiempo	Luis del Monte	Supporting role
2002	Cómplices Al Rescate	Dr. Raúl Olivo	Recurring role
2002/03	¡Vivan los niños!		Special appearance
2003	Niña amada mía	Lic. Pedro Landeta	Supporting role
2004	Cero y van 4	Yuppie	Film
2004	Corazones al límite	Professor Muñoz	Recurring role
2004/05	Apuesta por un amor	Domingo Ferrer	Supporting role
2005	Contra viento y marea	Omar	Special appearance
2006	Duelo de Pasiones	Dr. Ricardo Fonseca	Recurring role
2006/07	Amar sin límites	Iván Dunov/César Fraustro	Recurring role
2007	Destilando Amor	Eugenio Ferreira	Special appearance
2008	Las tontas no van al cielo	Jorge	Special appearance
2008/09	Cuidado con el ángel	Tomás Millares	Special appearance
2008/09	Mañana es para siempre	Simón Palafox	Recurring role
2009	Hermanos y detectives	Alfonso Warman	1 Episode: "El caso del asesino gordo"
2009	Adictos		TV series
2009/10	Camaleones	Damián Montenegro	Recurring role
2009/10	Mar de amor	Enrique	Recurring role
2010/11	Triunfo del amor	Fernanda's Physiotherapist	Special appearance
2011	Rafaela	Dr. Fernando Balboa	Recurring role
2011	La fuerza del destino	Lic. Rubiales	Recurring role
2011	La rosa de Guadalupe		TV series
2012	Un refugio para el amor	Marcial	Recurring role
2012/13	Porque el amor manda	Eugenio	Recurring role
2013	Corazón Indomable	Dr. Guerra	Recurring role
2013	Mentir para vivir	Lic. Julio Manrique	Recurring role
2014/15	Mi corazón es tuyo	Gilberto Rosales	Special appearance
2014/15	Hasta el fin del mundo	Largarica	Recurring role
2016	A que no me dejas	Juan Castellanos	Special appearance
2016	Corazón que miente	Enrique Camargo	Special appearance
2016	Las amazonas	Roberto	Recurring role
2017	Mi marido tiene familia	Aurelio	Recurring role
2018	Por amar sin ley	Sergio Cervantes	Recurring role
2022	Corazón guerrero	Gabino Beltrán	Recurring role
