= Carmen Amezcua =

Mexican novelist and former actress

- Born: March 21, 1962 (age 64); Matamoros, Tamaulipas, Mexico
- Education: Universidad del Claustro de Sor Juana
- Occupations: Actress, Novelist
- Years active: 1980–present

Carmen Amezcua (born March 21, 1962) is a Mexican novelist and former actress.

== Life ==
Born in Matamoros, Tamaulipas, Mexico, she holds a degree in Human Sciences from the Universidad del Claustro de Sor Juana. In the late 1970s she worked for the newspaper El Heraldo de México, until in 1980, she began her career as an actress in Grupo Televisa. She has published short stories and poems in the book Hourglass XIV. In addition, she was president of the National Commission of Inspection and Surveillance of the National Association of Actors and Senior Official of the same union between 2004 and 2010.

== Filmography ==
Telenovelas, Television, and Films
Year	Title	Role	Notes
1982	Vanessa		
1982	Cachún cachún ra ra!		TV series
1983	Cuando los hijos se van		
1983–1987	La hora marcada		TV series
1984	Sí, mi amor		
1985	Principessa		
1986	Cuna de lobos	Waitress	Special Appearance
1986	Pobre señorita Limantour		Special Appearance
1988	Miss Caribe		Film
1989	Fórmula 1		Film
1989	Simplemente María		
1989–2006	Mujer, casos de la vida real		TV series
1990	Viernes trágico		Film
1990–1991	Pobre Serafín		TV series
1991	Al filo de la muerte	Lindsay	Supporting role
1991–1992	El Canal de las Américas		TV series
1992	Carrusel de las Américas		
1992	María Mercedes	Digna del Olmo Morantes	Supporting role
1993	Prisionera de amor	Gisela Vidal	Supporting role
1994	Caminos cruzados	Mónica Valle de García	Main Antagonist
1997	Amada enemiga	Elena Moreno	Supporting role
1998	Gotita de amor	Hermana Marcela	Supporting role
1998	Mujeres bravas		Film
2000–2001	Carita de ángel	Clarissa Santos Dorantes de Valadez	Supporting role
2005	Contra viento y marea	Lucía Campos	Supporting role
2005–2006	Peregrina	Angélica Morales	Supporting role
2009–2013	La rosa de Guadalupe		TV series
2013–present	Como dice el dicho		TV series

== Theatre ==
- El enfermo imaginario
- Cero y van tres
- Una vejez tranquila
- Don Juan Tenorio
- El taller del orfebre
- Vamos a contar mentiras
- Cuando los hijos no vienen
- Bodas de sangre
- Romeo y Julieta
- El avaro
