= Bianca Vidal =

Mexican telenovela

- Genre: Telenovela
- Created by: Inés Rodena
- Written by: Carlos Romero
- Directed by: Rafael Banquells; Carlos Tellez
- Starring: Edith González; Salvador Pineda; Rocío Banquells; María Teresa Rivas; Christopher Lago Carreño; Rafael Baledón
- Opening theme: Piano by Bebu Silvetti
- Country of origin: Mexico
- Original language: Spanish
- No. of episodes: 102

Production
- Executive producer: Valentín Pimstein

Original release
- Network: Canal de las Estrellas
- Release: December 1, 1982 – September 13, 1983

Related
- María José (1995); Corazón salvaje (2009)

Bianca Vidal is a Mexican telenovela produced by Valentín Pimstein for Televisa in 1982. It was based on the soap opera María Salomé, original of Inés Rodena which was then elongated by Sacrificio de mujer from the same author.

Edith González and Salvador Pineda starred as the protagonists, while Rocío Banquells starred as the main antagonist.

== Plot ==
Bianca Vidal is a humble young lady who works during the day and studying at night, then meet his teacher of literature, José Miguel Medina Rivas. She feels strongly attracted to him, who inevitably deserves, but he tries to seduce her is Enrique, friend of the professor. José Miguel is committed to Monica a cruel woman that marries only because she is pregnant. When both are declared his love, this it becomes impossible, because Don Raúl, Miguel José's father, confesses that he is the real father of Bianca.

== Cast ==
- Edith González as Bianca Vidal
- Salvador Pineda as José Miguel Medina Rivas
- Rocío Banquells as Mónica Rondán/Sandra/Meche
- María Teresa Rivas as Doña Esther Monasterio de Medina Rivas
- Christopher Lago Carreño as Rodolfito Medina Rivas Rondán †
- Rafael Baledón as Don Raúl Medina Rivas
- Aurora Molina as Ofelia #1
- Blanca Torres as Ofelia #2
- Oscar Bonfiglio as Patudo
- Orlando Rodríguez as Ceferino Vidal
- José Elías Moreno as Enrique Montes †
- Dina de Marco as Guillermina
- Beatriz Aguirre as Emilia †
- Luciano Hernández de la Vega as Rodolfo Medina Rivas †
- Viviana Nuñez as Raquel Rinaldi
- Juan Carlos Serrán as Alfonso
- Jaime Garza as Mauricio Fonseca
- Nuria Bages as Adriana Castro
- Patricia Reyes Spindola as Cirila
- Ada Carrasco as Vicenta
- Aurora Clavel as Rosa
- Pedro Damián as Gustavo
- Pituka de Foronda as Eloisa
- Rubén Rojo as Armando
- Marco Muñoz as Ramiro Zerpa
- Julieta Rosen as Chela
- Alonso Iturralde as Humberto Carrillo
- Beatriz Ornelas as Juanita
- Arturo Lorca as Dr. Mario
- Isabela Corona as Nana María
- Alejandro Tomassi as Dr. Torres
- José Roberto Hill as Dr. Carlos Palacios
- Alejandro Landero as Manuel
- Luis Couturier as Dr. Ruiz
- Eugenio Cobo as Dr. Millán
- Luz Elena Silva as Felisa
- Leandro Martínez as Arturo
- Sergio Acosta as Adolfo Guzmán
- Arturo Guízar as Lic. Rojas
- Enrique Muñoz as Dr. Rivera
- Aurora Cortés as Remedios Vidal
- Manuel Guizar as Antonio
- Tere Cornejo as Teresa Ramírez
- Eduardo Díaz Reyna as Police
- Margarita Cortés as Lucinda
- Carmen Cortés as Dorinda
- Janet Ruiz as Lupita
- Ricardo de Loera as Luis
- Fernando Ciangherotti as Dr. García
- David Rencoret as Mesero
- Raúl Marcelo as Ricardo
- Estela Chacón as Arminda
- Juan Antonio Marrón as Ricardo
- Alicia Ravel as Mimí
- Claudia Inchaurregui as Silvia
- Arturo Peniche as Pedro
- Tomás I. Jaime
- Julio Monterde as Doctor
- Leticia Calderón
- Óscar Sánchez as Anselmo
- María González as Fernanda
- Magda Trillo as Magdalena
- Lupelena Goyeneche as Presa
- Antonio González as Inspector Calvo
- Viviana Nunes as Raquel Rinaldi
- Reynaldo Vallejos as Marcelo
- Sandra Solimano as Francisca
- Emilio Gaete as Don Raimundo Rinaldi
- Liliana Ross as Doña Sofía de Rinaldi
- Ramón Farías as Sebastián Echeñique
- Paulina Nin de Cardona as herself
- Antonio Fendel
- Claudia Castelvi

== Awards ==
Year	Award	Category	Nominee	Result
1984	2nd TVyNovelas Awards	Best Antagonist Actress	Rocío Banquells	Won
