= Banquells =

Banquells is a surname. Notable people with the surname include:

- Rafael Banquells (1917–1990), Cuban-born Mexican actor, director, and television producer
- Rocío Banquells (born 1958), Mexican pop singer and actress
