= Ernesto D'Alessio =

Mexican actor and singer

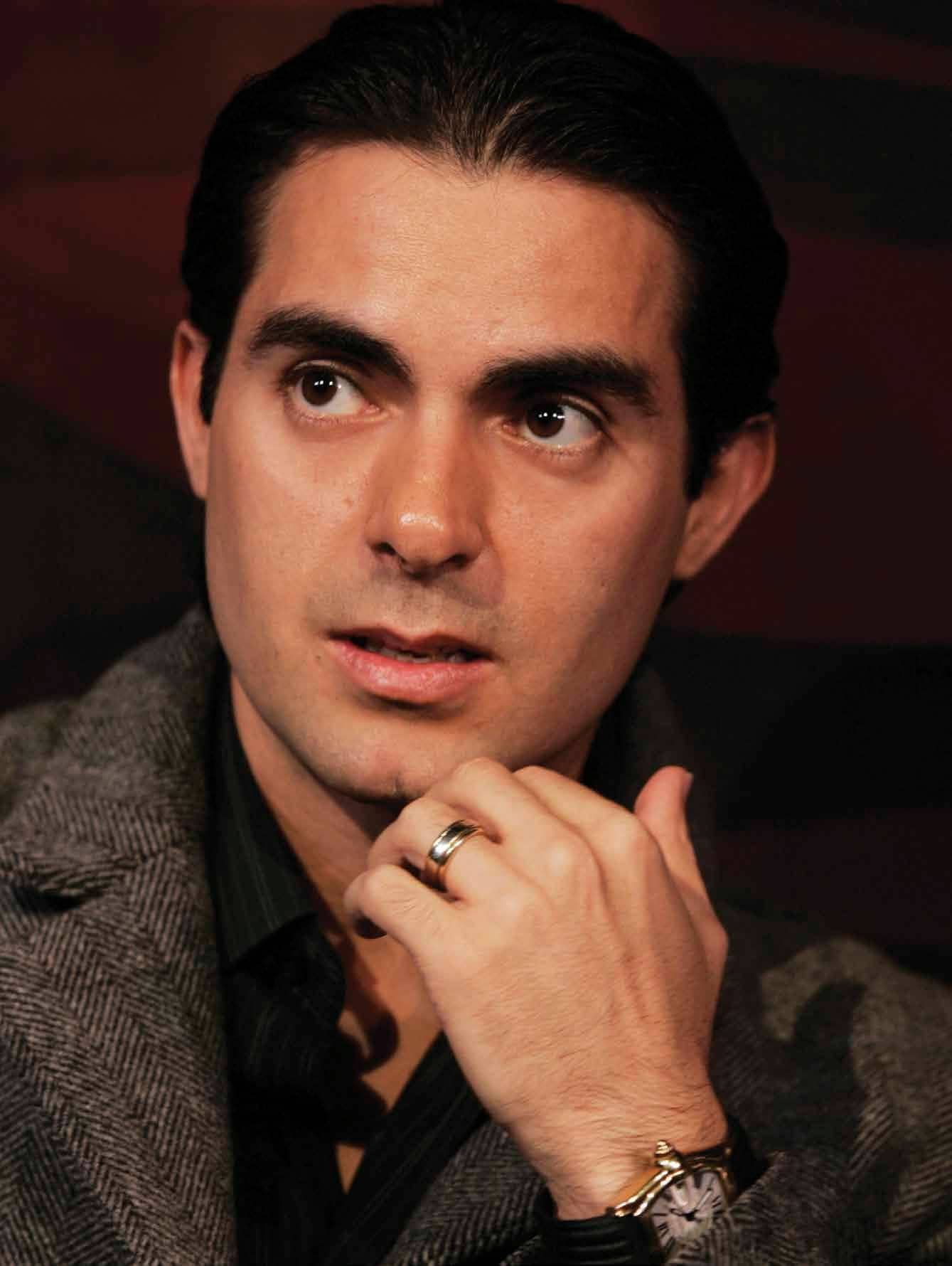
- Ernesto D'Alessio
- Born: Ernesto Alonso Vargas Contreras; March 6, 1977 (age 49); Mexico City, Mexico
- Occupations: Actor, singer
- Years active: 1990–present

Ernesto D'Alessio (born Ernesto Alonso Vargas Contreras on March 6, 1977) is a Mexican actor and singer.

== Life ==
D'Alessio was born in Mexico City in 1977. He is son of Mexican singer and actress Lupita D'Alessio and the singer and actor Jorge Vargas. He has one older brother Jorge D'Alessio and a younger brother, two younger half-sisters of the second marriage of his father, and a younger half-brother of the fifth marriage of his mother.

In 1990 he debuted as an actor. In 1997 he starred in telenovela El alma no tiene color. In 1999 he played as Mateo in DKDA: Sueños de juventud. In 2005 he starred in Contra viento y marea as the main antagonist.

In 2006 he participated in a reality show Cantando por un sueño and finished in 3rd place. The same year he participated in another reality show, Reyes de la canción and finished in 2nd place.

In the 2018 general election he was elected to the Chamber of Deputies to represent Nuevo León's 8th district for the Social Encounter Party (PES).

== Filmography ==
Year	Title	Role	Notes
1997	El alma no tiene color	Papalote	Supporting role
1999/00	DKDA: Sueños de juventud	Mateo D'Ávila	Supporting role
2000	Va De Nuez en Cuando		
2001	Aventuras en el tiempo	El Brother	Recurring role
2002	Salomé	José Miguel Lavalle	Supporting role
2003	Bajo la misma piel	Andrés Murillo Ortiz	Supporting role
2005	Contra viento y marea	Eduardo Cárdenas Contreras	Main Antagonist
2006	Heridas de amor	Juan Jiménez García	Supporting role
2006	Cantando por un sueño	Himself/Contestant	Reality show/3rd place
2006	Reyes de la canción	Himself/Contestant	Reality show/2nd place
2006/07	Código Postal	Gerardo Villalpando	
2007	Tormenta en el paraíso	Leonardo Bravo Andrade	Supporting role
2007	Lágrimas de cristal	Marcos Granados	Film
2007	La misma Luna	Oscar Ponce	Film
2013	Lo que más quieras		
2014	Beautiful Prison	Chente	Film
2015	A que no me dejas	Darío Córdova	Supporting role
2016	Por siempre Joan Sebastian	Jose Miguel Figueroa	TV series

== Theatre ==
- Los Miserables – Marius

== Soundtracks ==
- El uno para el otro – DKDA: Sueños de juventud
- Mi viejo – Heridas de amor
- Mí mujer – Que te perdone Dios
