= Anastasia Acosta =

Mexican actress and model

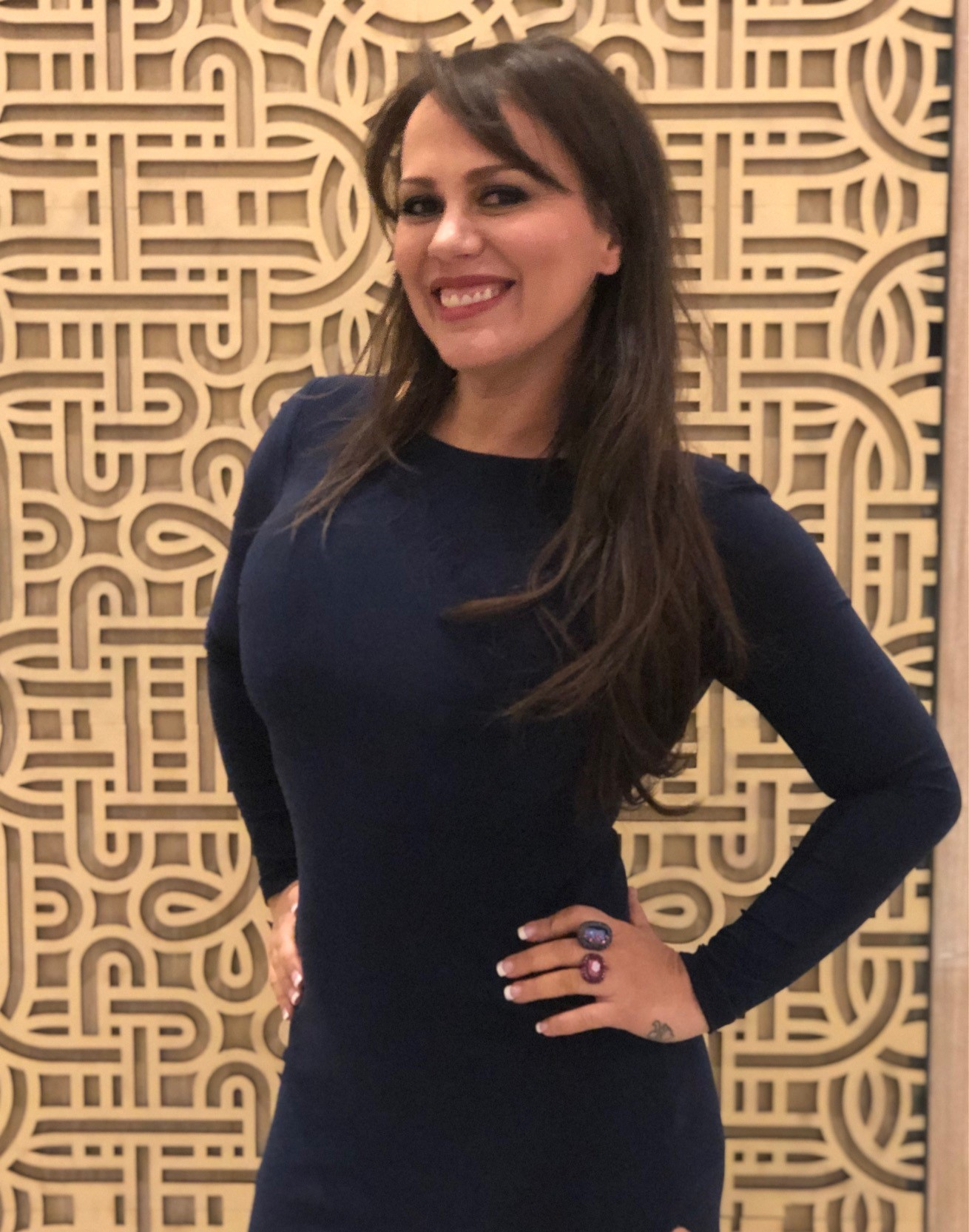
- Born: Anastasia Magdalena Acosta Loría; October 18, 1974 (age 51); San José, Costa Rica
- Occupations: Actress; model
- Years active: 1995-present

Anastasia Acosta (born Anastasia Magdalena Acosta Loría on October 18, 1974) is a Mexican actress and model.

== Life ==
Born in San José, Costa Rica, Anastasia started her career in the modeling world and came to the attention of Mexican producers. She was invited to stay in Mexico to star as a game show model in the Mexican version of "Wheel of Fortune" ("La Rueda de la Fortuna"). Shortly after, the actor and producer Jorge Ortiz de Pinedo invited her to co-host the program "Humor es los Comediantes". Anastasia became well known for her roles in television comedy, particularly the television series "Cero en Conducta". She then moved on to play antagonist roles in several soap operas.

== Filmography ==
Telenovelas, Series, Films, TV Show/Programs
Year	Title	Role	Notes
1996	Marisol	Yolanda "Yoli"	Supporting role
1996	El diario de la noche	Herself	TV series
1998	La usurpadora	Viviana Carrillo de Gómez	Supporting role
1998-99	Derbez en cuando	Herself	TV series
1999	Rosalinda	Alcira Ordoñez	Supporting role
1999-00	Cuento de Navidad	Jasive/Viriana	TV mini-series
1999-01	Humor es... Los Comediantes	Herself/Presenter	TV program
1999-03	Cero en conducta	Rosa Davalos Montes	TV series
2001-06	Mujer, casos de la vida real		TV series
2002-03	¡Vivan los niños!	Dalia	Supporting role
2003	Corazón de melón	Bárbara	Film
2003	La jaula	Herself	TV series
2004	Amar otra vez	Adriana Candamo Rivadeneyra	Supporting role
2005	Pablo y Andrea	Paula	Supporting role
2007-08	Tormenta en el paraíso	Leonor	Supporting role
2009-11	Se Vale	Herself	TV show
2012	Un refugio para el amor		Special appearance
2014	Los miserables	Consuelo "Chelo" Durán Monteagudo de Gordillo	Supporting role

=== Theater ===
- Quiero pero no puedo (Teatro Insurgentes)
- El show de la escuelita (Teatro blanquita)
- Busco al hombre de mi vida, marido ya tuve (Teatro Arlequín/Teatro Ofelia)
