= Piel (TV series) =

- Starring: Alba Roversi; José Luis Rodríguez; Eduardo Serrano; Astrid Gruber
- Country of origin: Venezuela

Production
- Running time: 45 minutes
- Production company: Marte Televisión

Original release
- Network: Venevisión
- Release: 1992 – 1992

Piel (Skin) is a Venezuelan telenovela which starred Alba Roversi, José Luis Rodríguez, Eduardo Serrano and Astrid Gruber. It was produced and broadcast on Marte TV in 1992.

== Cast ==
- Alba Roversi (Camila)
- José Luis Rodríguez González (singer) (Vicente)
- Astrid Gruber (Octavia / Diana)
- Eduardo Serrano (Max)
- Manuel Salazar
- Juan Carlos Gardie
- Miguel Ferrari (Agustin)
- Mirtha Pérez
- Alma Inglianni
- Betty Ruth (Altagracia)
- Luis de Mozos
- Pedro Renteria
- Martin Lantigua (Clemente)
- Herminia Martinez
- Cosme Cortazar
- Yanis Chimaras
- Eric Noriega
- Yajaira Paredes
- Jenire Blanco
- Alberto Sunshine
- Beatriz Fuentes
- Javier Paredes
- Natalia Fuenmayor
- Joanna Benedek (Sandra)
- Roxanita Chacon
- Carlos D. Alvarado
- Rolando Padilla
- William Mujica
- Antonieta Colon
- Oscar Abad
- Mario Balmaceda
- Santos Camargo
- Mayra Africano
- Vilma Ramia
- Beatriz Valdes
- Nancy Toro
- Carla Daboin
- Antonio Cuevas
- Alfredo Sandoval
- José Antonio Carbonell
