= María María =

Venezuelan television series

- Created by: Marte TV
- Written by: José Simón Escalona; Jhonny Gavlovsky; Mariana Luján; Xiomara Moreno; Humberto 'Kiko' Olivieri
- Directed by: César Bolívar
- Starring: Alba Roversi; Arturo Peniche
- Country of origin: Venezuela
- Original language: Spanish
- No. of episodes: 198

Production
- Production location: Caracas
- Running time: 45 minutes
- Production company: Marte Televisión

Original release
- Network: Venevisión
- Release: 1990

María María is a Venezuelan telenovela which starred Alba Roversi and Arturo Peniche. It was produced and broadcast on Marte TV in 1990.

== Synopsis ==
María María is the continuing story of Julia Mendoza who, after suffering amnesia from an accident, assumes the identity of Maria Alcantara, a young, frivolous millionaire. Julia's innocent act has startling repercussions, which shatter her life and the lives of those around her. Maria and Julia are in a terrible car accident together but only Julia is found at the accident site. She is horribly disfigured and is mistaken for María when she is unable to remember even her name. Later, she undergoes plastic surgery and is recreated as Maria. While a gang of beggars holds the real Maria, who also survived the crash, captive, Julia adopts Maria's identity. She grows to love Maria's husband, Esteban Araujo, who is accused of the death of her father. Julia's memory finally returns and life becomes an endless cycle of struggles, passion and torments.

== Cast ==
- Alba Roversi as María
- Arturo Peniche
- Julie Restifo
- Mara Croatto
- Veronica Ortiz as Silvia
- Luis Alberto de Mozos
- Aroldo Betancourt
- Eric Noriega
- Nancy González (actress)
