= Nací para ti =

Nací para tí

Studio album by Rocío Banquells
- Released: 2007
- Recorded: 2007
- Genre: Pop, ranchero
- Label: Universal Music

Rocío Banquells chronology
Coincidír: Grandes Exitos (1996)	Nací para tí (2007)

Nací para tí is the last album by Mexican pop singer Rocío Banquells. This album was released in 2007. It was recorded live in the Teatro de la Ciudad in Mexico City on May 10, 2007.

== History ==
The album is the return of Banquells to the world of the music after 10 years. The album was recorded on live in the Teatro de la Ciudad in Mexico City. The album includes two discs: The first includes a compilation of Pop and Balada songs of the Banquells's career. The second is a compilation of her Mariachi songs. The second disc includes a new mariachi version of the 1985's classic Luna mágica.

== Track listing ==
=== Disc One ===
Tracks:

1. Este hombre no se toca
2. Amantes
3. Con él
4. Escucha el infiníto
5. Estupido
6. Coincidír
7. Recuerdos (Memory)
8. No llores por mí Argentina (Don't cry for me Argentina)
9. Abrázame
10. No soy una muñeca

=== Disc Two ===
Tracks:

1. Intro Mariachi
2. Que bonita es mi tierra
3. La Noche y tu
4. Libro abierto
5. Llorarás
6. Cielo Rojo
7. Entrega Total
8. Nací para tí
9. Fué un placer conocerte
10. Echame a mí la culpa
11. La mujer ladina
12. La puerta negra
13. Cucurrucucu Paloma
14. Luna mágica
15. Si nos dejan
16. Nací para tí (Studio)
17. Luna magica (Mariachi version, Studio)

== Singles ==
- Luna mágica (Mariachi version, Studio)
