= Marimar (Mexican TV series) =

- DVD cover
- Genre: Telenovela
- Created by: Inés Rodena
- Based on: "La indomable" by Inés Rodena
- Written by: Valeria Phillips; Inés Rodena; Carlos Romero
- Directed by: Beatriz Sheridan
- Starring: Thalía; Eduardo Capetillo
- Theme music composer: Paco Navarrete
- Opening theme: "Marimar" by Thalía
- Country of origin: Mexico
- Original language: Spanish
- No. of episodes: 149 (74 one hour)

Production
- Executive producers: Valentín Pimstein; Verónica Pimstein
- Producer: Maricarmen Marcos
- Running time: 21-22 minutes
- Production company: Televisa

Original release
- Network: Canal de las Estrellas
- Release: January 31 – August 26, 1994

Related
- La indomable; Rosa Salvaje; Abrázame muy fuerte; Marimar (2007); Corazon indomable; Que te perdone Dios; Marimar (2015)

Marimar is a Mexican telenovela created by Inés Rodena and produced by Valentín Pimstein and Verónica Pimstein for Televisa in 1994. It is a remake of the 1977 telenovela La venganza, which is in turn based on the radionovela La indomable. It stars Thalía and Eduardo Capetillo. It on Canal de las Estrellas from January 31 to August 26, 1994.

== Plot ==
Marimar, an innocent poor girl, lives with her grandparents in a beach hut in San Martin de la Costa, where she crosses paths with Sergio, the son of a wealthy ranch owner. After stealing food from the Santibañez's garden, she is caught by Nicandro, the Hacienda foreman, who nearly assaults her—but Sergio intervenes, leading to their blossoming romance and marriage. However, their union faces opposition, particularly from Angélica, Sergio's stepmother, who looks down on Marimar for her simplicity and lack of formal education.

Angélica schemes to ruin Marimar, humiliating her at a party with a ridiculous dress while Antonieta falsely accuses her of an affair with Chuy, a ranch worker.

After Sergio leaves for a business trip, Angélica tricks Marimar into fetching a valuable necklace from the dirt with her teeth, then frames her for theft, leading to her arrest. She later orchestrates the burning of Marimar's grandparents’ hut with her grandparents inside, and forges a letter in Sergio's handwriting, claiming he never loved her.

Scarred by betrayal, Marimar seeks revenge, adopting the identity of “Bella” with Padre Porres' help after her release from prison and relocating to Mexico City to rebuild her life.

Marimar's life takes a turn when she works for Gustavo Aldama, who has been searching for his daughter, María del Mar, and with his sister Esperanza's help, she refines her skills and appearance. Her journey becomes even more profound when she discovers she is pregnant with Sergio's child and later gives birth to their daughter, Crucita.

Marimar reinvents herself as Bella Aldama, a sophisticated socialite, and unexpectedly reunites with Sergio at the opera, fueling her desire for revenge against him and the Santibañez family. After revealing her true identity to Gustavo during a confrontation with Bernardo Duarte, Gustavo suffers a fatal heart attack, leaving Marimar to inherit part of Club Valle Encantado. She manages the club alongside her cousins until Bernardo sells his share to Rodolfo San Genis, a wealthy admirer, further complicating Marimar's tangled relationships. As she catches the interest of Governor Fernando Montenegro, his daughter Natalia falls for Sergio, turning Marimar into her rival.

Renato kills Nicandro after catching him attempting to assault Angélica, then flees to Valle Encantado, where Marimar manipulates Brenda into seducing him, leading to his downfall in alcohol, gambling, and debt. Seeking revenge, Marimar forces Angélica to retrieve promissory notes from the mud with her teeth before selling her share of Valle Encantado and returning to San Martin de la Costa. Meanwhile, Antonieta leaves her wealthy lifestyle for Chuy, and Sergio marries his childhood friend, Inocencia del Castillo, only for Marimar to crash their wedding. Angélica, tormented by Nicandro's twin brother investigating his death, faces the consequences of her past actions.

Angélica suffers a fatal car accident on her way to Valle Encantado, and, consumed by hatred, demands that Marimar's house be burned before she dies. Meanwhile, Inocencia, troubled by Sergio's lingering attachment to Marimar, collapses during pregnancy and is hospitalized, where she safely delivers her child but is diagnosed with a brain tumor. During her hospital stay, she strikes a deal with Marimar: if she survives surgery, Marimar must stay away from Sergio; if not, Marimar must marry him. Despite this, Marimar vows to forget Sergio, regardless of Inocencia's fate.

Marimar starts a relationship with engineer Adrián Rosales, while Inocencia, grateful for her recovery, apologizes to Marimar and vows not to interfere with her and Sergio, as long as he supports their child. Meanwhile, Renato regrets his past actions and seeks forgiveness for both himself and Angélica.

Padre Porres helps Sergio understand Marimar's pursuit of revenge, allowing them to confront their unresolved feelings over a betrayal that never occurred. With newfound clarity, they reconcile and remarry in a small church in San Martin de la Costa, bringing their journey to a heartfelt conclusion.

== Cast ==
- Thalía as María del Mar Aldama Pérez / Bella Aldama
- Eduardo Capetillo as Sergio Santibáñez
- Miguel Palmer as Gustavo Aldama
- Guillermo García Cantú as Bernardo Duarte
- Alfonso Iturralde as Renato Santibañez
- René Muñoz as Father Porres
- Marta Zamora as Perfecta
- Chantal Andere as Angélica López de Santibáñez
- Ada Carrasco as Mamá Cruz
- Tito Guízar as Papá Pancho
- Carlos Becerril as Pulgoso (voice)
- Pituka de Foronda as Aunt Esperanza
- Luis Gatica as Chuy
- Kenia Gascón as Antonieta López
- Daniel Gauvry as Arturo
- Toño Infante as Nicandro Mejía
- Julia Marichal as Negra Corazón
- Frances Ondiviela as Brenda
- Marisol Santacruz as Mónica
- Ana Luisa Peluffo as Selva
- Martha Ofelia Galindo as Josefina
- Rafael del Villar as Esteban
- Nicky Mondellini as Gema
- Fernando M. Gutierrez as Chico
- Rosángela Balbó as Eugenia
- Ricardo Blume as Fernando Montenegro
- Juan Carlos Serrán as Ulises
- Amairani as Natalia Montenegro
- Marcelo Buquet as Rodolfo San Genís
- Serrana as Alina
- Indra Zuno as Inocencia del Castillo y Corcuera
- Hortensia Clavijo as La Cucaracha
- Patricia Navidad as Isabel
- Fernando Colunga as Engr. Adrián Rosales
- Meche Barba as Doña Clorinda
- Agustín Manzo as Himself
- Manuel Negrete as Himself
- Julio Canessa as Himself

== Success in the Philippines ==
The show achieved remarkable success in the Philippines upon its 1996 airing on RPN Filipino Dubbed. The series captivated audiences, reaching peak ratings of 61.7%. Its popularity led RPN to re-broadcast the series, further solidifying its status as a cultural phenomenon. This success paved the way for other Mexican telenovelas to air in the Philippines, influencing local television programming. It also led to the airing of Thalía's other telenovelas, such as Maria Mercedes, María la del Barrio and Rosalinda. Additionally, it shifted the landscape of Filipino teleseryes towards faster-paced storylines.

Marimar: The Movie, a feature-length recap of the telenovela, was theatrically released by Solar Entertainment in the Philippines on October 2, 1996.

Due to Marimar's massive success and public demand, Thalia flew to the Philippines for a concert at the Areneta Coliseum on August 18, 1996, she then return in 1997 for two-day concert. The Latina superstar delighted fans by singing a few lines in Filipino, including the Tagalog versions of Maria la del Barrio as well as the beloved song Nandito Ako. She also playfully engaged with the audience, saying “Chika lang!” and sang its song in between performances, which made fans adore her even more. The event was widely praised for its production and Thalia's deep connections with her Filipino fans, making it one of the most unforgettable Latin concerts in the country.

There's also a parody account of Chantal Andere's villain character called Senyora Santibañez.

== Awards and nominations ==
Year	Award	Category	Nominee	Result
1995	13th TVyNovelas Awards	Best Actress	Thalía	Nominated
1995	13th TVyNovelas Awards	Best Actor	Eduardo Capetillo	Nominated
1995	13th TVyNovelas Awards	Best Antagonist Actress	Chantal Andere	Nominated
1995	13th TVyNovelas Awards	Best Antagonist Actor	Toño Infante	Nominated
1995	13th TVyNovelas Awards	Best Leading Actor	Tito Guízar	Nominated
1995	13th TVyNovelas Awards	Best Co-lead Actress	Frances Ondiviela	Nominated
1995	13th TVyNovelas Awards	Best Co-lead Actor	Miguel Palmer	Nominated
1995	13th TVyNovelas Awards	Highest-rated Telenovela in the USA	Valentín Pimstein	Won
1995	Latin ACE Awards	Best Scenic Program	Marimar	Won
1995	Latin ACE Awards	Female Figure of the Year	Thalía	Won
1995	Latin ACE Awards	Male Figure of the Year	Eduardo Capetillo	Won
1995	Latin ACE Awards	Best Supporting Actor	Tito Guízar	Won
1995	Latin ACE Awards	Best Direction	Beatriz Sheridan	Won

== Remake ==
The first ever remake, as granted by Televisa, was the 2007 Philippine version of the same title Marimar starring Marian Rivera under GMA Network. It was a huge hit around Asia at the time. In Mexico, Nathalie Lartrilleaux remade Marimar in 2013 under the title Corazón indomable and Ana Brenda Contreras and Daniel Arenas starred as the protagonists. In 2015, Philippines' GMA Network remade the Mexican telenovela for a second time, with Tom Rodriguez and Miss World 2013 winner Megan Young playing the title role.

== See also ==
- Senyora Santibañez, an Internet meme
