= Nacho (1983 TV series) =

- Genre: Telenovela
- Created by: César Miguel Rondón
- Starring: Alba Roversi; Guillermo Dávila; Corina Azopardo
- Opening theme: "No paras de pensar en él" by Guillermo Dávila
- Country of origin: Venezuela
- Original language: Spanish
- No. of episodes: 64

Production
- Executive producer: Tabaré Pérez
- Running time: 60 minutes

Original release
- Network: Venevision
- Release: 1983 – 1983

Related
- Ligia Elena

Nacho is a 1983 Venezuelan telenovela produced and broadcast on Venevision. It is a sequel to the 1982 telenovela Ligia Elena written by César Miguel Rondón. Alba Roversi and Guillermo Dávila reprised their roles from Ligia Elena as the main protagonists.

== Plot ==
Ignacio Ramón "Nacho" Gamboa becomes a successful musician, but his growing fame and fortune create challenges in his relationship with Ligia Elena. His new talent manager, Carlota Leonardo, attempts to interfere in their relationship and seeks to separate them.

== Cast ==
- Alba Roversi as Ligia Elena Irazabal
- Guillermo Dávila as Ignacio Ramón Nacho Gamboa
- Corina Azopardo
- Manuel Poblete
