= Carmen Alardín =

Mexican poet (1933–2014)

- Born: 5 July 1933
- Died: 10 May 2014 (aged 80)
- Occupation: poet
- Children: Ana Silvia Garza; Jaime Garza

Carmen Alardín (5 July 1933 – 10 May 2014) was a Mexican poet. She was known for her poems such as La violencia del otoño (The Violence of Fall) and No pude detener los elefantes (You Can't Detain Elephants). Alardín specialized in German literature. She studied at National Autonomous University of Mexico.

== Works ==
- El canto frágil (1951)
- Pórtico labriego (1953)
- Celda de viento (1957)
- Después del sueño (1960)
- Todo se deja así (1964)
- No puede detener los elefantes (1971)
- Canto para un amor sin fe (1976)
- Entreacto (1982)
- La violencia del otoño (1984)
- La libertad inútil (1992)
- Caracol de río (2000)
- Miradas paralelas (2004)
