= María José (1995 TV series) =

Mexican telenovela

- Genre: Telenovela; Romance; Drama
- Created by: Inés Rodena
- Written by: Gabriela Ortigoza; Ricardo Tejeda
- Directed by: Beatriz Sheridan; Antulio Jiménez Pons; Juan Carlos Muñoz
- Starring: Claudia Ramírez; Arturo Peniche; Ana Patricia Rojo; María Victoria; Ernesto Gómez Cruz; Saby Kamalich; Rogelio Guerra
- Opening theme: María José by José Alfredo Obregón
- Country of origin: Mexico
- Original language: Spanish
- No. of episodes: 70

Production
- Executive producer: Juan Osorio
- Production locations: Filming; Televisa San Ángel; Mexico City, Mexico
- Cinematography: Ernesto Arreola; Antulio Jiménez Pons; Manuel Ruiz Esparza; Pedro Vázquez
- Running time: 41-44 minutes
- Production company: Televisa

Original release
- Network: Canal de las Estrellas
- Release: February 13 – May 18, 1995

Related
- Bianca Vidal (1982)

María José is a Mexican telenovela produced by Juan Osorio for Televisa in 1995.

Claudia Ramírez and Arturo Peniche starred as protagonists, while Ana Patricia Rojo starred as the main antagonist.

== Plot ==
María José is a beautiful and humble young woman who has had to work as domestic help to support herself and her ailing father, Serafín. Her mother Rosario had died long ago. Carlos Alberto is the only son of Raúl Almazán and Piedad and has always been a spoiled child.

== Cast ==
- Claudia Ramírez as María José Reyes
- Arturo Peniche as Carlos Alberto Almazán
- Ana Patricia Rojo as Imperia Campuzano de la Cruz
- María Victoria as Pachita
- Ernesto Gómez Cruz as Serafín
- Saby Kamalich as Piedad de Almazán
- Rogelio Guerra as Raúl Almazán
- Beatriz Aguirre as Teresa
- Leonardo Daniel as Octavio Campuzano
- Raquel Morell as Natalia de la Cruz de Campuzano
- Anthony Álvarez as El Tuercas
- Leticia Perdigón as Esther
- Roberto Ballesteros as Joel
- Charly Valentino as Vivales
- Daniel Zamora as Raúl
- Óscar Morelli as Mauro
- Olivia Collins as Dalila
- Alejandro Aragón as Vicente
- Lili Blanco as Felicia
- Aurora Clavel as Mercedes "Meche"
- Armando Araiza as Mateo
- Héctor Soberón as Darío
- Guillermo de Alvarado as Condorito
- Isabel Martínez "La Tarabilla" as Cleta
- Beatriz Monroy as Zoila
- Claudio Brook as Rodrigo Almazán
- Estela Barona as Rosario
- Guadalupe Bolaños as Norma
- Juan Cid as Tobías
- Monserrat Gallosa as Rosa
- Christel Klitbo as Adelita
- Adriana Lavat as Susana Valtierra
- Claudia Ortega as Tina
- Juan Verduzco as Horacio
- Esteban Franco as Jacinto
- Sergio Neach as Rodrigo
- Maty Huitrón as Dr. Juárez
- Eduardo Cáceres as Saúl
- Juan Antonio Gómez as Dr. Gil
- Marco de Carlo as Dr. Rebolledo
- Luis Guillermo Martell as Felipe
- Nelson Velázquez as Ing. Ruiz
- María José Cadenas as La Bebé
- Roberto Molina as Dr. Molina
- Maickol Segura as El Lombriz
- Janet Pineda as Pilar
- Luis Alberto Arteaga as El Púas
- Ramón Menéndez as Justino
- Alberto Díaz as Juan
- Mónica Pablos as Luisa
- Arturo Delgado as Captain Martínez
- Carlos González as Detective Esparza
- Mónica Dossetti as Carla
- Mario Carballido as Paco
- Julio Casado as Hugo
- Sergio Morante as Leopoldo
- Germán Blando as León
- Juan Carlos Alcalá as Fernando
- Fernando Castro as Teodoro
- Yolanda Palacios as Aída
- Ramiro Ramírez as El Araña
- Julio Bracho as Agent Ojeda
- María Luisa Coronel as Emma
- Salvador González as Benito José
- Fabiola Campomanes as Linda
- Luisa Acosta as Eugenia
- Carmelina Encinas as Lourdes
- Olivares as Romualdo
- Germán Montalvo as Montalvo
- Rosángela Balbó
- Simone Brook
- Jesús Carrasco
- Helio Castillos
- María Duval
- José Luis Duval
- Azucena Hernández
- Víctor Nassry
- Jorge Pais
- Enrike Palma
- José Puga
- Lillyan Tapia
- Raúl Valerio
- Angélica Zamora
- Juan de la Loza

== Awards ==
Year	Award	Category	Nominee	Result
1996	Premios ACE	Best Actor	Arturo Peniche	Won
1996	Premios El Heraldo de México	Best Television Actor	Arturo Peniche	Won
