= María Mercedes (Mexican TV series) =

Mexican telenovela

- Genre: Telenovela
- Written by: Vivian Pestalozzi; Carlos Romero
- Story by: Inés Rodena
- Directed by: Beatriz Sheridan
- Starring: Thalía; Arturo Peniche
- Theme music composer: Viviana Pimstein
- Opening theme: "María Mercedes" performed by Thalía
- Country of origin: Mexico
- Original language: Spanish
- No. of episodes: 82

Production
- Executive producers: Carlos Sotomayor; Valentín Pimstein
- Producer: Salvador Mejía Alejandre
- Production locations: Mexico City, Mexico
- Cinematography: Antonio Acevedo
- Editor: Adrián Frutos Maza
- Camera setup: Multi-camera
- Production company: Televisa

Original release
- Network: Canal de las Estrellas
- Release: September 14, 1992 – January 5, 1993

Related
- Maria Mercedes (2013)

María Mercedes (Spanish pronunciation: [maˈɾi.a meɾˈseðes]) is a Mexican telenovela produced by Valentín Pimstein for Televisa in 1992. It was the first of the "Marías" telenovela trilogy, being followed by Marimar and María la del Barrio. María Mercedes is a remake of the telenovela Rina, which in turn is based on the radionovela Enamorada by Inés Rodena.

Thalía and Arturo Peniche starred as protagonists, while Laura Zapata starred as the main antagonist. Fernando Ciangherotti also had a special participation.

== Plot ==
Maria Mercedes, a young woman abandoned by her mother and neglected by her alcoholic father, supports her siblings by working in the streets of Mexico City. Santiago del Olmo, a dying man, marries her to thwart his greedy aunt Malvina after his death. Following Santiago’s passing, Maria becomes the head of the family, enraging Malvina. Per Santiago's will, Malvina, her son Jorge Luis, and daughter Digna must live with Maria to inherit his fortune. Jorge Luis, haunted by his wife’s murder on their wedding day, is deeply pessimistic, while Digna, highly religious and inexperienced in love, struggles with fear and insecurity.

After moving into the del Olmo household, María falls for Jorge Luis, who is controlled by his manipulative mother, Malvina. To regain the family fortune, Malvina orchestrates a marriage between Jorge Luis and María, intending for him to divorce her later. Initially distant, Jorge Luis eventually falls genuinely in love with María. Meanwhile, María faces hostility from Mistica, Jorge Luis' jealous ex-girlfriend, who teams up with Malvina to oust her.

María reconnects with her estranged mother, Maria Magnolia, now wealthy and remorseful for abandoning her family. Maria Magnolia secretly helps María and her jailed brother Guillermo while concealing her identity and actions from her new family, including her husband Rodolfo and son Gustavito, as well as María's siblings Rosario and Andres.

Maria Magnolia teaches María refinement and how to win over her husband, Jorge Luis. At a high-society party hosted by Sebastian Ordoñes, who tries to seduce María, Jorge Luis becomes jealous and enchanted by her transformation. This leads to a romantic breakthrough, and they finally consummate their marriage. María soon discovers she is pregnant. However, their relationship unravels during a disastrous vacation, disrupted by Mistica and a flirtatious lifeguard. Consumed by jealousy and impulsiveness, Jorge Luis demands a divorce upon their return to Mexico City.

Malvina schemes to destroy María by conspiring with the butler, Cordelio, to drive her insane and have her committed to an asylum. However, María escapes and hides with Doña Filo, a friend from her poor days, until Jorge Luis convinces the police to stop pursuing her. Malvina's attempts to kill María with Cordelio’s help fail.

Recognizing Maria Magnolia's influence on María, Malvina suspects she might be María’s mother and shares her theory with Magnolia's husband, Rodolfo. Rodolfo confirms this after visiting María's siblings, Rosario and Andres, and recognizing their mother's photo. Confronting Magnolia, he accuses her of abandoning her family, leading to her expulsion from their home. Maria Magnolia survives the fallout by working with a French tailor who once encouraged her ambitions, which she prioritized over her family.

Meanwhile, Jorge Luis realizes he cannot live without María. Seeking forgiveness, he reconciles with her, and they finally live together as a true married couple.

Nine months later, María gives birth to twin girls, but one tragically dies shortly after. Jorge Luis permanently ends Mistica's interference after exposing her false claim that he fathered her child, which is actually her husband Sebastian's. When Jorge Luis realizes his mother still despises María, he finally stands up to her, choosing to leave and build a life with María and their child.

The strain of recent events, including Jorge Luis' departure, drives Malvina into a mental breakdown. She begins mimicking María’s past life, selling lottery tickets and cleaning windshields on the streets. Eventually, she is caught and committed to an asylum.

Maria Magnolia decides to reveal the truth to her children. While María is initially shocked, she forgives her mother and accepts her with love. Rosario, however, reacts with anger and resentment until Rodolfo Mancilla, her boss and Magnolia's husband, agrees to embrace all of them as his stepchildren. This reconciliation helps the sisters make peace, and Rosario accepts the courtship of Ricardo, a younger friend of Jorge Luis, without conflict.

María and Jorge Luis, who had only a civil wedding, decide to celebrate a grand church wedding at the Basilica of Guadalupe. Surrounded by their loved ones, they exchange vows, ending the story with a romantic kiss.

== Cast ==
- Thalía as María Mercedes "Meche" Muñoz González de del Olmo
- Arturo Peniche as Jorge Luis del Olmo Morantes
- Laura Zapata as Malvina Morantes Vda. del Olmo
- Gabriela Goldsmith as María Magnolia "Magnolia" González de Mancilla
- Carmen Amezcua as Digna del Olmo Morantes
- Carmen Salinas as Doña Filogonia
- Nicky Mondellini as Mística Casagrande de Ordóñez
- Fernando Ciangherotti as Santiago del Olmo
- Roberto Ballesteros as Cordelio Cordero Manso
- Luis Uribe as Manuel Muñoz
- Fernando Colunga as Chicho
- Karla Álvarez as Rosario Muñoz González
- Meche Barba as Doña Chonita
- Rosa Carmina as Doña Rosa
- Jaime Moreno as Rodolfo Mancilla
- Raúl Padilla "Chóforo" as Argemiro "El Chupes" Camacho
- Luis Gimeno as Don Sebastián Ordóñez
- Roberto "Flaco" Guzmán as Teo "El Jarocho"
- Aurora Molina as Doña Natalia
- Virginia Gutiérrez as Doña Blanca Sáenz
- Jaime Lozano as Dr. Díaz
- Alberto Inzúa as Lic. Mario Portales
- Enrique Marine as Guillermo "Memo" Muñoz González
- Héctor del Puerto as Servant Lic. Portales
- Héctor Gómez as Chaplin
- Julio Urrueta as Napoleón
- Silvia Caos as Alma
- Carlos Rotzinger as Dr. Antonio Valadez
- Manuel D'Flon as Lázaro
- Irma Torres as Nanny Cruz
- José Luís González y Carrasco as Dr. Salvador Torres
- Agustin Lopez Zavala as Lic. Molina
- Vanessa Angers as Berenice
- Marco Uriel as Adolfo
- Sylvia Campos as Diana San Román
- Evangelina Sosa as Candelaria "Candy"
- Cuco Sánchez as Genaro
- Carlos Corres as Pepe
- Marcela Figueroa as Esther
- Arturo Garcia Tenorio as Rogasiano "El Latas"
- Yula Pozo as Lucinda
- Diana Golden as Fabiola Mayerling San Román
- Lucero Lander as Karin
- Arturo Lorca as El Mollejas
- Rebeca Manríquez as Justa
- Erika Olivo as Virikita
- Irlanda Mora as Aunt Paz
- Xavier Ximénez as Father Enrique
- Rossana San Juan as Zafiro
- Rafael del Villar as Ricardo
- Patricia Navidad as Iris
- Victor Vera as Judge Civil Registry
- Paquita la del Barrio as Paquita
- Ari Telch as Carlos Urbina
- David Ostrosky as Dr. Muñoz
- Alfredo Gutiérrez as Andrés "Andresito" Muñoz González
- Ricardo Vera as Lic. Gómez Portales
- Lina Michel as Mother Marcela
- Elia Domenzain as Director of Academy
- Janet Candiani as Secretary of Lic. Portales
- Marta Zamora as Herminia
- Sara Montes as Rebeca
- María Eugenia Ríos as Director of reformatory
- Eduardo Liñán as Public Ministry Agent
- Armando Franco as Elías Carillo
- Tito Livio as El Clavo
- Jorge Granillo as El Hamburguesa
- Dolores Salomón "Bodokito" as Ludovina
- Gustavo Rojo as Dr. Pérez
- Adal Ramones as Guy Menendez
- América as Betty
- Aarón Beas as Aldo
- Guillermo Murray as Dr. Carvajal
- Miguel Garza as Ramiro
- Paola Garera as Mirna
- Eduardo Rivera as Danilo
- José Zambrano as Lic. Robles

== Awards ==
Year	Award	Category	Nominee	Result
1993	11th TVyNovelas Awards	Best Telenovela	Valentín Pimstein	Nominated
1993	11th TVyNovelas Awards	Best Actress	Thalía	Nominated
1993	11th TVyNovelas Awards	Best Actor	Arturo Peniche	Won
1993	11th TVyNovelas Awards	Best Antagonist Actress	Laura Zapata	Won
1993	11th TVyNovelas Awards	Best Supporting Actress	Carmen Salinas	Won
1993	11th TVyNovelas Awards	Best Supporting Actress	Gabriela Goldsmith	Nominated
1993	11th TVyNovelas Awards	Best Supporting Actor	Fernando Ciangherotti	Won
1993	11th TVyNovelas Awards	Best Supporting Actor	Raúl Padilla "Chóforo"	Won
1993	11th TVyNovelas Awards	Best Young Lead Actress	Thalía	Won
1993	11th TVyNovelas Awards	Best Female Revelation	Nicky Mondellini	Nominated
1993	11th TVyNovelas Awards	Best Telenovela (International Segment)	Valentín Pimstein	Won
1993	Bravo Awards	Best Young Lead Actress	Thalía	Won
1993	Latin ACE Awards	Best Scenic Program	Valentín Pimstein	Won
1993	Latin ACE Awards	Best Actor	Arturo Peniche	Won
1993	Latin ACE Awards	Best Director	Beatriz Sheridan	Won
1993	El Heraldo de México Awards	Best Female Revelation	Thalía	Won
1993	Eres Awards	Best Actress	Thalía	Won

== Remake ==
A Philippine remake aired on ABS-CBN from October 7, 2013 to January 24, 2014 as part of Primetime Bida evening block starring Jessy Mendiola (as Maria Mercedes Alegre), Jake Cuenca (as Luis Sancuevas), and Jason Abalos (as Clavio Mondejar).
