= Rocío Banquells (album) =

Studio album by Rocío Banquells
- Released: 1985
- Recorded: 1985
- Genre: Pop
- Label: WEA

Rocío Banquells chronology
Rocío Banquells (1985)	Con él (1986)

Rocío Banquells is the 1st studio album by Mexican pop singer Rocío Banquells. This album was released in 1985.

== History ==
The album debut of the great Mexican singer Rocío Banquells. The album includes songs as Este hombre no se toca, Luna Mágica and Abrázame. The album is considered one of the classics of the Spanish-Language music of the 1980s. The majority of the records was written and produced by famous Di Felisatti & J.R. Florez group.

== Track listing ==
Tracks:

1. Este hombre no se toca
2. Abrázame
3. No moriré por tí
4. Habría que inventarte
5. Amantes
6. Ocrilú
7. Como se cambia
8. Luna mágica
9. Ayudame
10. Quien me roba el corazón

== Singles ==
- Este hombre no se toca
- Abrázame
- Luna mágica

== Covers ==
- Singer María José covered the song "Este hombre no se toca" for her 2009 album Amante de lo ajeno.
