= Alba Roversi =

Venezuelan actress (born 1961)

- Born: Alba Teresa Roversi Key; August 14, 1961 (age 64); Caracas, Venezuela
- Occupation: Actress

Alba Roversi (born August 14, 1961) is a Venezuelan telenovela and theater actress who rose to fame in the 1980s and 1990s for her role in telenovelas.

== Filmography ==
Television
Year	Title	Role
1981	María Fernanda	Alejandra
1982	Ligia Elena	Ligia Elena Irazabal
1982	El Retorno de Ana Rosa	Ana Rosa
1983	Nacho	Ligia Elena Irazabal
1983	Virginia	Virginia
1984	El retrato de un canalla	Andrea
1985	Las Amazonas	Eloisa Lizárraga
1985	Eternamente Tuya	Orquídea
1986	Los Donatti	Marisol
1986	Esa Muchacha de ojos color café	Caridad San José 'Carita
1989	Fabiola	Fabiola
1989	María María	María/Julia
1991	La traidora	Valeria Montoya
1992	Piel	Camila
1997	Maria de los Angeles	Orquídea Córdoba Escalante
1998	Niña Mimada	Natalia Jorda
1999	Mujer Secreta	Esperanza Salvat
1999	Carita Pintada	Piera Bernal
2000	Hay Amores Que Matan	Ifigenia Barreto
2000	Angélica Pecado	Francisca Del Ávila
2001	A Calzón Quitao	Clara Inés Ramírez
2002	Las González	Orquídea González
2004	Ángel Rebelde	Elena Covarrubias Andueza
2005	El amor no tiene precio	Rosalía
2006	Ciudad Bendita	María 'Maga' Gabriela
2007	Arroz con Leche	Teresa Pacheco
2007	El rostro de Analia	Angelina Covarrubias Infante Montiel de Andrade
2009	Amor Urbano	
2009	Los misterios del amor	Deborah Salazar
2010	La mujer perfecta	Minerva León
2012	Corazón Valiente	Nora del Castillo"La Madrina"
2013	Marido en Alquiler	Maria Iris de Silva
2017	Sangre de mi tierra	Sara
