= Kary Fajer =

Mexican writer

Kary Fajer (born 23 June 1953, in Mexico D.F., Mexico), is a Mexican television writer, mostly for Mexican media company, Televisa. She is well known for being the head writer of telenovelas for the producer Nicandro Díaz González.

Fajer's most successful telenovelas include: Carita de ángel, ¡Vivan los niños!, La indomable, Simplemente María, Gotita de amor, Contra viento y marea, Destilando amor, Mañana es para siempre, Soy tu dueña, Amores verdaderos y Hasta el fin del mundo.

== Filmography ==
=== Adaptations ===
- Golpe de suerte (2023/2024) Original of Rodrigo Cuevas
- La mexicana y el güero (2020/2021) Original of Víctor Carrasco and Vicente Sabatini
- El Bienamado (2017) Original of Dias Gomes with Ximena Suárez
- Approach and Synopsis Hasta el fin del mundo (2014/2015) Original of Enrique Estevanez with Gabriela Ortigoza
- Amores verdaderos (2012/2013) Original of Marcela Citterio and Enrique Estevanez with Gerardo Moon, Alejandro Orive, Ximena Suárez, Julián Aguilar, Alberto Gómez
- Soy tu dueña (2010) Original of Inés Rodena with Gerardo Moon, Alejandro Orive, Alejandro Pohlenz.
- Mañana es para siempre (2008/2009) Original of Mauritius Navas and Guillermo Restrepo with Gerardo Moon
- Destilando Amor (2007) Original of Fernando Gaitán with Gerardo Moon
- First part of Contra viento y marea (2005) Original of Manuel Muñoz Rico with Gabriela Ortigoza
- ¡Vivan los niños!! (2002/03) Original of Abel Santa Cruz with Gerardo Moon and Calú Gutierrez.
- Carita de Ángel (2000/01) Original of Abel Santa Cruz with Alberto Gómez
- First part of Rosalinda (1999) Original of Delia Fiallo with Carlos Romero and Liliana Abud
- Gotita de amor (1998) Original of Raymundo López
- The children of anybody (1997) Original of Miguel Known
- The last hope (1993) Original of Abel Santa Cruz
- Some chapters of Simplemente María (Mexican telenovela) (1989/90) Original of Celia Alcántara
- The indomable (1987) Original of Hilda Moral Allois

=== Additional dialogues ===
- Second part of Prisoner of love (1994) Original Inés Rodena
- Half part of Valentina (1993)in the second part with Inés Rodena

== Prizes and nominations ==
=== Premios TVyNovelas ===
Year	Category	Soap opera	Resulted
2008	TVyNovelas Award for Best Original Story or Adaptation	Distilling love	Won
2014	TVyNovelas Award for Best Original Story or Adaptation	True loves	Won
