= Senyora Santibañez =

Internet meme

Senyora
- Born: Senyora Angelica Santibañez; July 20, 1990 (age 36)
- Website: Senyora Santibañez on Facebook

Senyora Angelica Santibañez is an exploitable image macro and Photoshop depicting the main antagonist in the Mexican telenovela Marimar and actor Chantal Andere as a snobbish and stereotypically arrogant Filipino hacienda owner. She is also the author of a book Lakompake.

The character became a meme and internet celebrity in the Philippines, following the successful remake of Marimar. She often involves herself in politics, especially defending former President Rodrigo Duterte.

== Overview ==
Following the successful remake of a Mexican telenovela Marimar, local media began sharing and taking notice of the meme, spawning variations. It was voted best meme of 2012. On November 11, 2012, a Fan Page on Facebook was created named Senyora Santibanez and soon became only Senyora. Andere's image became popular as the embodiment of the merciless, condescending haciendera that is a common Philippine cultural trope, and posts discussed mainly news including politics. The account had 6.5 million followers on Facebook as of June 17, 2023.

When Pia Wurtzbach was called out by former President and then-Mayor of Manila Joseph Estrada, who made a welcome gesture when Estrada gave Pia a kiss on the cheek, Senyora helped the meme spread by adding a sample from Maja Salvador's "Kilig". In October 2022, Senyora was also once dressed up for Halloween by the celebrity. In 2023, they are most well known to argue with Kiray Celis in social media.

== Background ==
The first-ever remake, as granted by Televisa, was the 2007 Philippine remake starring Marian Rivera under GMA Network. It was a hit around Asia at the time. In Mexico, Nathalie Lartilleux remade Marimar in 2013 under the title Corazón Indomable and Ana Brenda Contreras and Daniel Arenas starred as the protagonists. In 2015, Philippines' GMA Network remade the Mexican telenovela for a second time, with Tom Rodriguez and Miss World 2013 winner Megan Young playing the title role.

== Products ==
Senyora collaborated with Senator Nancy Binay and ABS-CBN to launch the book called Make Love Not War. They made it to deflect criticism on social media and increasingly of trolls by stating "We did our part of the book separately. It’s like slam book, I have my own share and she has her own," she explained. "It was really designed and conceptualized that we didn’t need to meet."

== Controversies ==
In 2019, during the rumour and the introduction of JoyRide PH, Senyora promoted Joyride PH on her Twitter account, and people grew suspicious of the company's motives. The tweet was later deleted by the author and resulted in criticism from other users.

Before the 2019 midterm general elections, Senyora was named and exampled as "micro-media manipulation." It was claimed that the character's administrator was involved in seeding political propaganda aimed at discrete groups of potential voters, and took form purportedly on non-political influencers on Facebook, Twitter, and Instagram. In 2021, Senyora was included in the agency's documents of Twinmark Media Enterprises, Inc. about her being paid to boost pro-Duterte propaganda and often posting fake news on social media.
