= Natalia Juárez =

Mexican actress (born 1995)

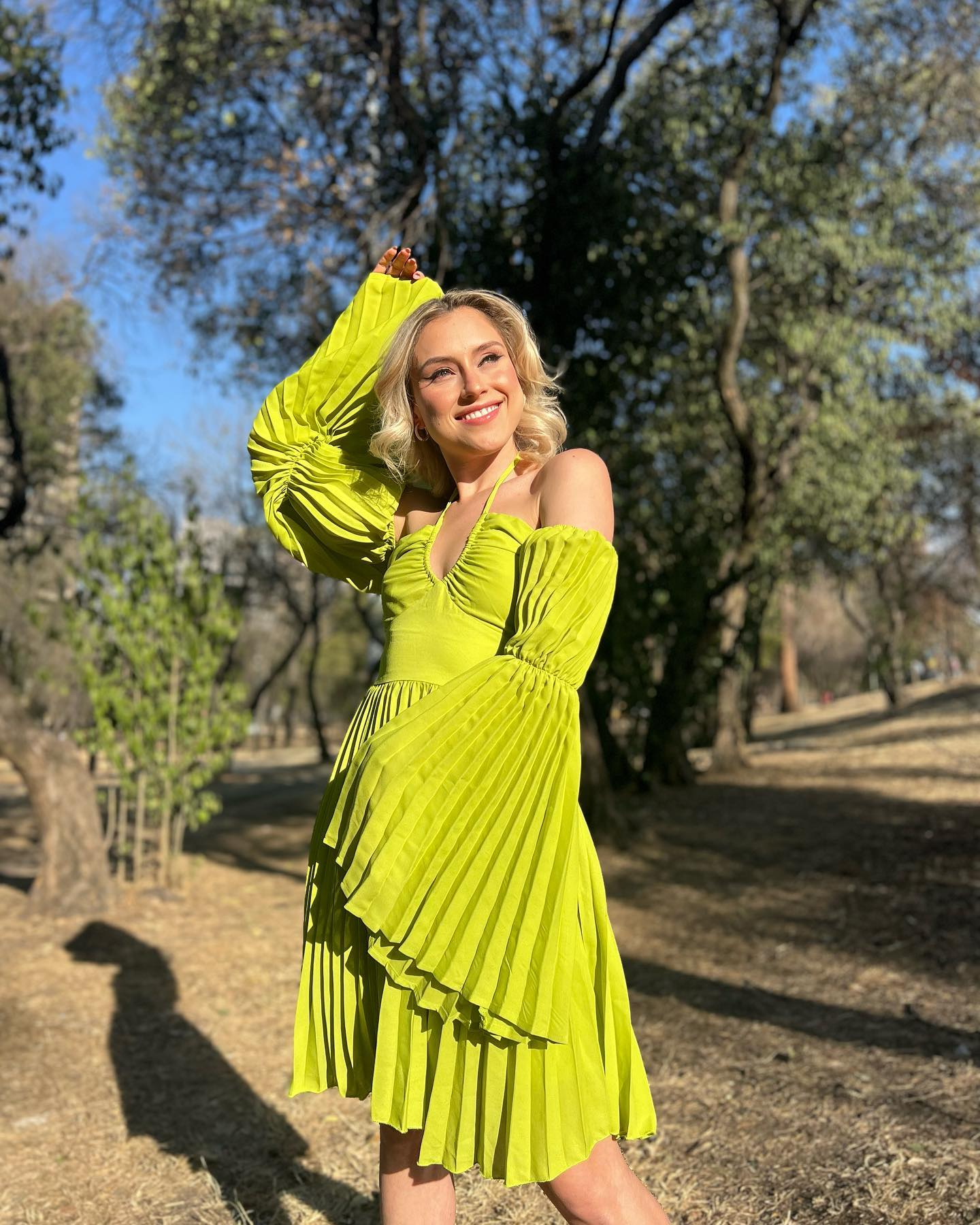
- Born: Natalia Juárez Zenteno López; February 13, 1995 (age 30); Mexico City, Distrito Federal, Mexico
- Occupation(s): Actress and content creator
- Years active: 2002–present

Natalia Juárez Zenteno (born February 13, 1995), is a Mexican actress known for her character "Simoneta" in the children's telenovela ¡Vivan los niños!.

== Filmography ==
Year	Title	Role	Notes
2002–2003	¡Vivan los niños!	Simoneta Molina	
2004	Mujer de madera	Child Marisa Santibáñez	
2005	Sueños y caramelos	Lucy	
2008–2015	La rosa de Guadalupe	6 episodios	Super amigas – Maria Jose – Una buena estrella – America
2008	Querida enemiga	Florencia	Uncredited
2008–2009	Un gancho al corazón	Marina	10 episodes
2009	Atrévete a soñar	Fabiola	
2011–2017	Como dice el dicho	Various roles	6 episodes
2013–2014	Lo que la vida me robó	Virginia	51 episodes
2016	Vino el amor	Unknown role	14 episodes
2018	Por amar sin ley	Anita	2 episodes
2024	Top Chef VIP	Herself	Contestant (season 3)
