= Silvia Manríquez =

Mexican actress (born 1954)

Silvia Manriquez
- Born: Silvia Manríquez; January 27, 1954 (age 72); Mexico City, Mexico
- Occupation: Actress
- Years active: 1974-present
- Children: Xareni and Lliv

Silvia Manríquez (born January 27, 1954, in Mexico City, Mexico) is a Mexican actress known for her roles in telenovelas.

== Professional life ==
Manriquez began her career in 1974, after she was named "El Rostro del Heraldo" by an important Mexican newspaper. Her first role in television was in the telenovela Lo Imperdonable (1975) with the Spanish actress Amparo Rivelles. She played characters in the movie La Casta Divina (1976) and in telenovelas as Un rostro en mi pasado (1991), Pueblo chico, infierno grande (1997) with Verónica Castro, Laberintos de Pasion (1999), Entre el amor y el odio (2002), Mundo de Fieras (2006), Dos hogares (2011) and recently Amores verdaderos (2012–2013).

== Personal life ==
Manríquez was born in Mexico. Her childhood wish was to become an actress. Her mother was the only family member that approved of her career aspirations. Silvia is divorced and she has two children named Xareni and Lliv.

Manríquez had many roles in telenovelas. She played Jovita Ruán in the telenovela Pueblo chico, infierno grande, with Verónica Castro. She played Rosalía, mother of evil Frida (Sabine Moussier) in Entre el amor y el odio. She also played Amparo in Contra viento y marea.

== Filmography ==
=== Telenovelas ===
Year	Title	Role	Notes
1975	Lo imperdonable		
1983-84	Bodas de odio	Armida	Supporting Role
1984-85	Si, mi amor	Leticia	Supporting Role
1986	Cautiva	Graciela	Supporting Role
1989-90	Un rostro en mi pasado	Elvira Duboa	Supporting Role
1997	Pueblo chico, infierno grande	Jovita Ruán de Irepán	Supporting Role
1997-1998	Desencuentro	Alma	Supporting Role
1998-1999	El privilegio de amar	Luz María de la Colina	Supporting Role
1999-2000	Laberintos de pasión	Sara de Sandoval	Antagonist
2000-2001	El precio de tu amor	Ana Luisa Galván	Supporting Role
2001	La Intrusa	Elena Roldán	Supporting Role
2002	Entre el amor y el odio	Rosalía	Supporting Role
2002	La Otra	Marta Caballero de Guillén (young)	Special Appearance
2004	Amarte es mi pecado	Ana María Fernández del Ara	Supporting Role
2005	Contra viento y marea	Amparo Cárdenas	Antagonist
2006-07	Mundo de Fieras	Ingrid	Antagonist
2007	Muchachitas como tu	Constanza de Villaseñor	Supporting Role
2009-10	Corazon Salvaje	Madame Marlene De Fontenak/Magda	Supporting Role
2010-11	Cuando Me Enamoro	Catalina Gamba Vda. de Soberón (young)	Special Appearance
2011-12	Dos Hogares	Amparo Mejía Vda. de Estrada	Supporting Role
2012-13	Amores Verdaderos	Paula Trejo de Guzmán	Supporting Role
2013	Corazon Indomable	Clementina del Olmo	Supporting Role
2015	Lo imperdonable	Martin and Demetrio's mother	Special Appearance
2015-16	Simplemente María	Marcela	
2017	Mi marido tiene familia	Rebeca	8 episodes
2017	En tierras salvajes	María	38 episodes
2018	Por amar sin ley	Melisa	Guest star

=== Films (selected) ===
- 1974: El Buscabullas
- 1975: Chisme Caliente
- 1975: Lo Veo y no lo Creo
- 1976: Fox Trot
- 1976: La Casta Divina
- 1977: Misterio en las Bermudas
- 1977: Muerte a Sangre Fría
- 1977: Río de la Muerte
- 1978: Hermanos Chicanos
- 1978: Mexicano Hasta las Cachas
- 1978: Dinastía Dracula
- 1979: Todos Los Días un Día
- 1979: Ojo por Ojo
- 1979: Aqui esta Emili Varela
- 1979: El Giro el Pinto y el Colorado
- 1979: El Siete Vidas
- 1979: Las Tres Sobrinas del Diablo
- 1980: El Canto de Los Humildes
- 1980: La Sangre de Nuestra Raza
- 1980: La Carrera de los Sexos
- 1981: Un Reverendo Trinquete
- 1981: El Naco más Naco
- 1981: Las Musiqueras
- 1982: El Guerillero del Norte
- 1982: En Las Garras de la Ciudad
- 1982: Sorceress
- 1982: Un Adorable Sinverguenza
- 1982: El Pueblo que Olvidó
- 1983: Esta y al otra por el mismo Boleto
- 1983: Los Hijos de Peralvillo
- 1984: Entre Hierrba Polvo y Plomo
- 1984: Bohemio por Afición
- 1984: Jugandose la Vida
- 1985: La Muerte Llora de Risa
- 1985: Forajidos en la Mira
- 1987: Mente Asesina
- 1987: Conexión México
- 1987: Los Ojos del Muerto
- 1987: Persecución en las Vegas
- 1988: El Unico Testigo
- 1989: Entre Juego y Contrabando
- 1989: Carroña Humana
- 1989: Catalepsia
- 1990: Las Viejas de mi Compadre
- 1990: Funerales del Terror
- 1991: La Guerrera Vengadora
- 1991: El Enviado de la Muerte
- 1992: El Secuestro de un Periodista
- 1992: El Grito de la Sangre
- 1992: Alto Poder
- 1993: La Venganza
- 1994: Que Padre tan Padre
- 2000: Amor Siego
- 2001: El Día de los Albañiles 4
- 2015: ‘’El Hotel

== See also ==
- List of characters in Entre el amor y el odio
