= Andrea Lagunés =

Andrea Lagunes
- Born: 29 October 1992 (age 33); Mexico City, Mexico
- Occupations: Singer; songwriter; actress
- Years active: 1995–present
- Height: 164 cm (5 ft 5 in)
- Musical career
- Genres: Latin pop; pop rock; dance-pop; electropop
- Instruments: Vocals; guitar
- Labels: EMI Televisa; Independent

Andrea Lagunes Barrales, known as Andrea Lagunes is a Mexican singer and actress, born in Mexico City on October 29, 1992. She started to work on television shows at the age of four and became famous by starring in the telenovela Gotita de amor (Droplet of Love).

== Career ==
At the age of three years, Andrea Lagunes joined the Center for Arts Education of Televisa, where she received acting and dance lessons for 3 years. At the age of four years she appeared in 25 episodes of the soap opera Maria Isabel produced by Carla Estrada, after participating in programs such as Plaza Sesamo and Que nos Pasa?.

In 1998 she starred in the telenovela Gotita de amor, for which she recorded an album under the same name. The album was composed of 13 songs. After the successful soap opera, she debuted on stage in the play "Little Red Riding Hood and the Three Little Pigs".

In 1999, she appeared in the soap operas Alma Rebelde and Cuento de Navidad, and later in Mi Destino Eres Tu, playing the role of Ximena.

In the same year she recorded her second album, A Love Jet.

Andrea has also done commercials in Caracas Venezuela. and has appeared on several unit as Furcio and Caroline in Real Life. For the year 2001 participated in the soap opera Carita de Angel of Nicandro Diaz.

For the year 2002 had a brief participacion in the soap opera Vivan los Ninos, playing Miranda, a brat and selfish child, who grew up without her mother at her side.

She also participated in "Operation Triumph GalaNovela" with the cast of Televisa Kids.

== Television appearances ==
- El espacio de Tatiana
- Mujer, casos de la vida real (2001–2005) – 6 episodes
- Plaza Sésamo
- ¿Qué nos pasa?
- Hoy
- La Familia Peluche
- Furcio
- GalaNovela de Operación Triufo
- La rosa de Guadalupe
- Como dice el dicho

== Soap operas ==
- María Isabel (1997) – Gloria Mendiola (niña)
- Mi pequeña traviesa (1997–1998)
- Gotita de amor (1998) – Isabel Arredondo/García De Santiago
- Alma rebelde (1999) – Angelita
- Cuento de navidad (1999) .... Niña ángel
- Mi destino eres tú (2000) – Ximena Rivadeneira Pimentel
- Carita de ángel (2001) – Irma Valadez
- ¡Vivan los niños! (2002) – Miranda
- Lo Que La Vida Me Robo (2014) – Diana Garcia

== Theater ==
- Caperucita Roja y los Tres Cochinitos
- El Hado Zorro y el Ruiseñor de Oro
- Ricitos de Oro
- El Mago de Oz

== Discography ==
- Gotita de Amor (1998)
- Un Chorro de Amor (1999)
