= Cantando por un sueño =

Mexican television contest

Cantando por un Sueño (Singing for a Dream) is a television contest produced by the Mexican television network Canal de las Estrellas which also aired on Univision in the United States. As with its twin show Bailando por un sueño (Dancing for a Dream), celebrities are paired with common, everyday people. However, in Cantando por un Sueño, contestants have to sing, rather than dance to impress the panel of judges and win. The panel of judges is made up of famous Latin American singers. Prizes generally include costly interventions to help people in unfortunate situations including blindness, deafness, paralysis, mortal diseases, bankruptcy, etc. Mexican singer Thalía is the "godmother" of this contest, and she sings the title song of the show too. Cantando por un Sueño had three seasons of about seven episodes each and concluded in a final fourth season Called "Reyes de la Canción" (Song's Royalty) where the winners, runners-up and 3rd-place finishers of the first three seasons compete in a final showdown. (In the third season, 4th place went to "Reyes", because before being eliminated, they received the highest score).

== On air ==
=== Hosts ===
- Adal Ramones
- Liza Echeverría
- Alessandra Rosaldo

=== Judges ===
- Yuri
- Ricardo Montaner
- Adrian Posse (1st and 2nd season)
- Susana Zabaleta (1st and 2nd season)
- Manuel Mijares (3rd season)
- Kiko Campos (3rd season)

Substitutes:

- Amanda Miguel (3rd season) (substituting Yuri)

== Contestants ==
=== Season 1 ===
Celebrity	Contestant	Teacher	Dream	Place
Sheyla (actress/humorist)	Cipriano Hernández	Dulce	Tumor surgery for Cipriano's wife	WINNer
Kika Edgar (actress)	Raúl Juárez	José José	Help his sister Rosario	Runners-up
Ernesto D'Alesio (actor)	Ruth Vazquez	María del Sol	To help her best friend cure a fatal illness she currently had.	3rd Place
Manuel Landeta (actor)	Mónica Chávez	Amanda Miguel	Because Mónica had MS, she wanted to make sure her 4-year-old son would not be left alone in this world and got a chance to finish a career and to have a place to live when she died.	4th Place
Omar Chaparro (TV host/humorist)	Greys Hernández	Napoleón	Eye surgery for Greys' blind brother	5th Place
Sherlyn (actress)	Germán Martínez	Francisco Céspedes	Establish a dog training center for blind people	6th Place
Tiaré Scanda (actress)	Leonardo Guizar	Isabel Lascuraín	Buy an ambulance for a home	7th Place

=== Season 2 ===
Celebrity	Contestant	Place
Raquel Bigorra (TV host)	Francisco Castillo	WINNERS
Patricio Borghetti (actor)	Samia Abrin	Runners-up
Alicia Machado (model/Miss Universe 1996)	Marco Antonio Gutiérrez	3rd Place
Jorge Muñiz (TV host/humorist)	Selene Mendoza	4th Place
Roberto Blandón (actor)	Teresa López	5th Place
Lorena de la Garza (humorist)	Daniel Nelson Ibarra	6th Place
Alex Sirvent (actor)	Beth-Sua Bautista	7th Place

=== Season 3 ===
- Rubén Cerda, actor/humorist (partnered with Leydi Diana) teacher: Margarita "la diosa de la cumbia" eliminated third
- Luis Roberto Guzmán, actor (partnered with Argelia González) teacher: María Conchita Alonso eliminated second
- Gustavo Munguía, humorist (partnered with Jacqueline Carrillo) teacher:Nelson Ned eliminated fourth
- Maya, model (partnered with Everardo Ramírez)
- Everardo Ramirez, One of the finalists teacher: Napoleón eliminated sixth
- Alejandra Ávalos, actress (partnered with Moisés Sierra) teacher: Diego Verdaguer eliminated first
- Arturo Peniche, actor/TV host (partnered with Norma Irene Carbajal) teacher: Karinna eliminated fifth
- Chantal Andere, actress (partnered with Gerardo Urquiza) teacher: Ednita Nazario third place
- Alan, actor (partnered with Lorena Schlebach) – Runner up teacher: Arianna second place
- Rocío Banquells, actress (partnered with Carlos García) – WINNER teacher: Francisco Céspedes WINNER

== Reyes De La Canción ==
Everyone against everyone; no teams were selected for this season. The final 3 groups from all previous seasons were featured in this season, "Kings/Queens of The Song".

- Rocío Banquells
- Carlos García
- Alan
- Lorena Schlebach
- Chantal Andere
- Gerardo Urquiza
- Raquel Bigorra
- Francisco Castillo – Male Winner
- Patricio Borghetti
- Samia Karima
- Maya
- Marco Antonio Gutierrez
- Sheyla – Female Winner
- Everardo Ramírez
- Cipriano Hernández
- Kika Edgar – Female Runner-Up
- Raúl Juárez
- Ernesto D'Alesio -Male Runner-Up
- Ruth Vázquez

== Argentine version: Cantando por un Sueño ==
For the Argentine version, visite Cantando por Sueño (Argentina)
