= La hora del silencio =

Mexican telenovela

- Genre: Telenovela
- Created by: Original Story: Francisco Javier Camargo
- Directed by: Tony Carbajal
- Starring: Gloria Marín; David Reynoso
- Country of origin: Mexico
- Original language: Spanish

Production
- Executive producer: Miguel Ángel Herros

Original release
- Network: Canal de las Estrellas
- Release: 1978

La hora del silencio is a Mexican telenovela produced by Miguel Ángel Herros for Televisa in 1978.

== Cast ==
- Gloria Marín as Soledad
- Curro Rivera as Curro Montes
- David Reynoso as Gaspar
- Helena Rojo as Barbara
- Germán Robles as Miguel Romero
- Alma Delfina as Maribel
- Jaime Garza
- René Casados
