= Ligia Elena =

- Genre: Telenovela
- Created by: César Miguel Rondón
- Directed by: José Antonio Ferrara; José Fariñas
- Starring: Alba Roversi; Guillermo Dávila
- Theme music composer: Guillermo Dávila
- Opening theme: "Sólo pienso en ti"
- Country of origin: Venezuela
- Original language: Spanish

Production
- Executive producer: Tabaré Pérez

Original release
- Network: Venevisión
- Release: September 1982 – November 1983

Related
- Nacho

Ligia Elena is a Venezuelan telenovela written by César Miguel Rondón and produced by Venevisión in 1982.

Alba Roversi and Guillermo Dávila starred as the main protagonists.

== Plot ==
Ligia Elena is the story of love between a naive young society girl and a musician whose love faces various obstacles. Ligia Elena Irazabal is a beautiful rich girl who meets Ignacio Ramón Nacho Gamboa, an eccentric boy whose father Pancholón works as a driver for the Irazabal family. Nacho and Ligia Elena meet coincidentally and sparks fly between them at first. Nacho works at a nightclub called El gato enmochilado and one day, he invites Ligia Elena to come and see him play and she goes to the club with her best friend. Ligia Elena has fallen in love with Nacho, but she is engaged to Alfredo, a young lawyer. On her wedding day, Ligia Elena decides to leave Alfredo to be with Nacho, but she discovers that Dolores, the cashier at the night club is Nacho's lover. Feeling sad and confused, she eventually decides to marry Alfredo. Later, Nacho becomes a singing sensation when he is discovered by a music producer, and after becoming famous, he runs away with Ligia Elena to be together.

== Cast ==
- Alba Roversi as Ligia Elena Irazabal
- Guillermo Dávila as Ignacio Ramón Nacho Gamboa
- Diego Acuña
- Reneé de Pallás
- Raúl Xiqués
- Ramón Hinojosa
- Yolanda Méndez
- Julio Jung
- Corina Azopardo
- Esther Orjuela
- Juan Frankis
- Sandra Bruzón
- Estelín Betancort
- Hilda Blanco
- Pedro Durán
- Mariela Alcalá
- Lucila Herrera
- Laura Termini
