= Nicky Mondellini =

Italian-Mexican actress and ballerina

- Born: July 6, 1966 (age 59); Milan, Italy
- Occupations: Actress, ballerina
- Years active: 1983-2005
- Children: Stephanie, Mario, and Robert
- Parent(s): Mario Mondellini; Joan Hammond
- Relatives: 2 sisters

Nicky Mondellini (born Nicoletta Edna Mondellini Hammond on July 6, 1966, in Milan, Italy) is an Italian-born Mexican actress and professional ballerina.

== Early life ==
Mondellini was born to a British mother, Joan Hammond, and an Italian father, Mario Mondellini. She moved to Mexico City with her family when her father was transferred by his employer. She has two sisters.

From early childhood, she was introduced to the arts of acting and dancing by her mother, a professional choreographer. She began her acting career when she was 11 years old in the musical "Gypsy", and continued her career in Telenovelas (soap operas) with the Mexican network Televisa, Spanish classical theater and movies.

Mondellini decided to move with her family to Houston, Texas in 2006 following the kidnapping of two of her actress friends in Mexico City.

She won the Voice Arts award for Best Spanish Language Narrator in 2017. She has been nominated twice for the Premios TV y Novelas as Best Lead Actress and Best supporting Actress. She is fluent in five languages (Spanish, English, Italian, French and German), is a professional ballerina, a voice over talent, and has bachelor's and master's degrees in arts.

Mondellini is married and has three children: Mario, Robert, and Stephanie.

== Filmography ==
Year	Title	Role	Notes
1983	Videocosmos		
1989-93	La telaraña		
1989	Mi segunda madre		Special Appearance
1989-90	Simplemente Maria	Nurse	Supporting Role
1991	La Pícara Soñadora	Gina Valdez	Supporting Role
1992-93	María Mercedes	Mística Casagrande de Ordóñez	Antagonist
1992	Puerto Escondido		
1994	Marimar	Gema	Supporting Role
1995-96	Retrato de Familia	Patricia Cortés	Supporting Role
1997	Nic Habana		
1997	Esmeralda	Dra. Rosario Muñoz	Special Appearance
1998	Una Luz en el Camino	Victoria de de los Santos	Supporting Role
2000	Ramona	Beatriz de Echagüe	Supporting Role
2002-03	¡Vivan los Niños!	Sofía Luna	Supporting Role
2004	Corazones al límite	Lourdes "Lulú" Gómez de Arellano	Supporting Role
2005	Contra Viento y Marea	Constanza Sandoval de Balmaceda	Supporting Role

== Awards and nominations ==
=== Premios TVyNovelas ===
Year	Category	Telenovela	Result
1993	Best Young Lead Actress	Marimar	Nominated
1995	Best Supporting Actress in a Classical Theatre Play	"La Amistad Castigada"	Nominated
2017	Best Spanish Language Narrator		Won
