= Guillermo Dávila =

Musical artist (born 1955)

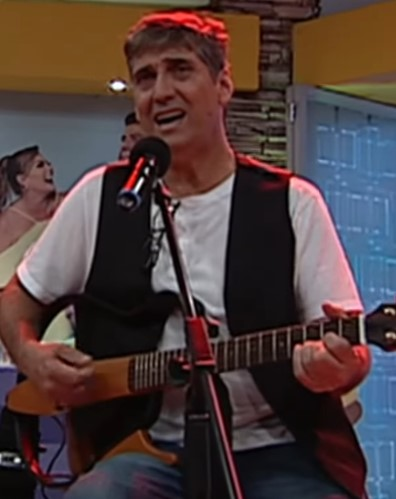
- Dávila in 2018
- Born: Guillermo José Dávila Ruiz; 18 March 1955 (age 71); Caracas, Venezuela
- Occupations: Actor; singer
- Years active: 1972–present
- Spouses: Chiquinquirá Delgado (m. 1991; div. 1997) Laura Echevarría (m. 2007)
- Children: Marielena Davila
- Musical career
- Genres: Latin Pop
- Instrument: Vocals
- Label: Rodven Records

Guillermo Dávila (born 18 March 1955, in Bailadores) is a Venezuelan actor and singer who has acted in many telenovelas.

== Biography ==
After starting his career in theatre in the 1970s, Dávila first gained national fame in after starring in the telenovela Ligia Elena together with its sequel Nacho. His international fame started rising then, and in 1984, he travelled to Puerto Rico, where he starred alongside Ivonne Goderich in the 1984 soap opera Diana Carolina for WAPA-TV. The series' title song, "Toda La Luz", became a number-one hit.

Dávila continued starring in telenovelas, and in 1992, he gained fame once more after starring in Cara Sucia.

As a singer, Dávila has released over ten albums, some of which reached international platinum or gold status. He sang the songs on the soundtracks for nearly all the soap operas he starred in.

Dávila had an international hit in 1989 when he recorded a duet with pop singer Kiara; the single was called "Tesoro Mío" (My Treasure) and was from the soap opera telenovela La Revancha. His first album of his new stage, Tu Corazón, followed in 1990.

== Illness ==
On 2 November 2014, Davila arrived at Luis Muñoz Marín International Airport in San Juan, Puerto Rico on a flight from Miami International Airport, apparently affected by a cold. His condition worsened, however, and he was later hospitalized at Centro Medico hospital in San Juan under strict secrecy. He was diagnosed with pneumonia and was in serious condition. Venezuelan entertainer Carlos Mata visited Davila and posted online that Davila was breathing artificially, but Davila's wife Laura Echevarria declared on 7 November, days after arriving to Puerto Rico to be by her husband's bedside, that Davila continued being in stable condition. On 16 November, Davila was much better and was expected to remain in good condition.

Davila later recuperated and was able to perform in Puerto Rico on 21 February 2015.

== Discography ==
1. Guillermo Dávila (1982 Venezuela release as Sono-Rodven) (1983 U.S. release as Top Hits)
2. Un Poco de Amor (1983 Venezuela release as Sono-Rodven) (1984 U.S. release as Rodven USA)
3. Definitivamente (1984 Venezuela release as Sono-Rodven) (1985 U.S. release as Rodven USA)
4. Cantaré Para Ti (1985 Venezuela release as Sono-Rodven) (1986 U.S. release as Rodven USA)
5. Guillermo Dávila 5 (1988) (1990 U.S. release as Tú Corazón)
6. Éxitos Y Algo Más (1990)
7. Tuyo (1990) (1991 U.S. release)
8. Por Amarte Tanto (1992)
9. Dulce Enemiga Y Otros Éxitos De Guillermo Dávila (1995)
10. Días de Pasión (1998)

== Singles ==
Year	Song	Hot Latin Songs	Album
1990	"Tesoro Mío (with Kiara)"	3	Éxitos Y Algo Más
1990	"Ábreme La Puerta"	39	Éxitos Y Algo Más
1991	"Yo Necesito Más De Ti"	17	Tuyo
1993	"Por Amarte Tanto"	31	Por Amarte Tanto
1993	"Cuando Se Acaba El Amor"	5	Por Amarte Tanto
1994	"Barco A La Deriva"	30	Por Amarte Tanto

== Telenovelas ==
- 1982: Ligia Elena as Ignacio Ramón Nacho Gamboa
- 1983: Nacho as Ignacio Ramón Nacho Gamboa
- 1984: Diana Carolina
- 1985: Cantaré para ti
- 1986: El Sol Sale Para Todos
- 1989: Fabiola as Carlos Alberto
- 1990: Adorable Mónica as Luis Alfredo
- 1992: Cara Sucia as Miguel Ángel González De la Vega
- 1995: Dulce Enemiga as Julio Cesar Guerrero
- 1997: Contra Viento y Marea as Sebastián León
- 1999: Sueños as Jose Carlos de la Vega
- 2001: Felina as Abel
- 2004: Cosita Rica as Gastón
- 2006: Ciudad Bendita as Macario
- 2007: Toda una dama as Juan Jose Reyes 'JJ'
- 2008: Nadie me dirá como quererte as Francisco Alonso
- 2013: Las Bandidas as Rodrigo Irazábal
