= El retrato de un canalla =

- Genre: Telenovela
- Written by: Jose Gabriel Nuñez
- Starring: Alba Roversi; Manuel Escolano; Raúl Xiques
- Opening theme: "Has lo que tu quieras" by Antonietta
- Country of origin: Venezuela
- Original language: Spanish
- No. of episodes: 120

Original release
- Network: Venevisión
- Release: 1984

El retrato de un canalla is a 1984 Venezuelan telenovela produced by Venevisión and distributed internationally by Venevisión International. Alba Roversi and Manuel Escolano starred as the main protagonists. The main theme song for the telenovela is "Has lo que tu quieras" by Antonietta.

== Plot ==
Andrea Moncayo has been overcome with sadness over the death of her boyfriend on her wedding day. She begins dating and later marries Miguel Moncayo, a noble man with two daughters from his first marriage, but they are not in love. Andrea meets Gabriel Serrano, a frivolous man with whom she falls in love.

== Cast ==
- Alba Roversi
- Manuel Escolano
- Raúl Xiques
- Yolanda Mendez
- Bety Ruth
- Elena Farias
