= ¡Vivan los niños! =

Television series

- Genre: Telenovela
- Created by: Abel Santa Cruz
- Written by: Kary Fajer; Alberto Gómez; Rosario Velicia
- Directed by: Marta Luna; Lily Garza
- Starring: Andrea Legarreta; Eduardo Capetillo; Miguel de León; Joaquín Cordero; Ignacio López Tarso
- Opening theme: "Vivan los Niños" by OV7
- Ending theme: "Vivan los Niños" by Ana Cristina
- Composer: Jorge Avendaño
- Countries of origin: United States; Mexico
- Original language: Spanish
- No. of episodes: 155

Production
- Executive producer: Nicandro Díaz González
- Producer: Pablo Noceda
- Production locations: Filming; Televisa San Ángel; Mexico City, Mexico
- Cinematography: Juan Carlos Frutos; Víctor Soto
- Camera setup: Multi-camera
- Running time: 41-44 minutes
- Production company: Televisa

Original release
- Network: Canal de las Estrellas; Disney Channel (Europe, Middle East and Africa)
- Release: July 15, 2002 – March 14, 2003

Related
- Jacinta Pichimahuida (1974); Señorita maestra (1983); Carrusel (1989-1990); Carrusel de las Américas; Carrossel (2012)

¡Vivan los niños! (English: Long live the children!) is a Mexican telenovela (Soap Opera) produced by Nicandro Díaz González for Televisa. It aired on Canal de las Estrellas from July 15, 2002, to March 17, 2003. It's an adaptation of the 1983 Argentine telenovela Señorita maestra (based on the original version also 1974 Argentine telenovela, Jacinta Pichimahuida).

Andrea Legarreta and Eduardo Capetillo starred as protagonists, Daniela Aedo, Óscar Alberto López, Natalia Juárez, Christian Stanley, Andrés Márquez, Valentina Cuenca, Nicole Durazo and Juan de Dios Martín starred as child protagonists, while Karla Álvarez and Alejandra Procuna starred as main antagonist.

== Plot ==
Lupita Gómez is a young teacher who recently left her people to go to work in Mexico City at the "Patria Unida" school, as recommended by her godfather Don Joaquín. There, she becomes a 2nd grade teacher. Lupita meets a group of children in her class whom she begins to adore. Her relationship with the children sends the cast on a series of comedic adventures.

== Cast ==
- Andrea Legarreta as Guadalupe "Lupita" Gómez Díaz
- Eduardo Capetillo as Emiliano Leal
- Miguel de León as Alonso Gallardo
- Joaquín Cordero as Don Joaquín Castillo
- Ignacio López Tarso as Don Ignacio Robles
- Raquel Olmedo as Director Alarica Caradura
- Renata Flores as Segismunda Verrugita/Rosamunda Cocoshka
- Manuel Saval as Fernando Molina
- Rebeca Mankita as Paola de Molina
- Isabel Martínez "La Tarabilla" as Francisca "Pancha"
- Raúl Padilla "Chóforo" as Felipe Gómez
- Miguel Galván as Primitivo Batalla
- Adriana Acosta as Graciela "Chela" de Batalla
- Alejandro Ruiz as Julián Castillo
- Zaide Silvia Gutiérrez as Estela de Castillo
- Nicky Mondellini as Sofía de Luna
- Eduardo Rodríguez as Gerardo Luna
- Daniela Aedo as Marisol Luna
- Natalia Juárez as Simoneta Molina
- Óscar Alberto López as Diego Loyola Iturralde
- Valentina Cuenca as Citlali Castillo
- Christian Stanley as Ángel Bueno Piña
- Andrés Márquez as Lucas Batalla
- Ana Paulina Cáceres as Polita Valle de la Rionda
- Nicole Durazo as Brisa Bravo
- Juan de Dios Martín as Damián Bravo
- Kevin Hung as Yuyi Wong
- Brayam Alejandro as Guillermo "Memo" Sánchez Palacios
- Valeria López as Wendy Anderson
- Raúl Sebastián as Santiago Valderrama
- Rafael Banquells Jr. as Othon Valle de la Rionda
- Hendrik Marine as Rodrigo Ricardi
- Juan Ignacio Aranda as Ricardo Ricardi
- Susan Vohn as Greta de Ricardi
- Jaime Garza as Juan Sánchez/Joanina Dulcinea
- Esther Rinaldi as Micaela Palacios de Sánchez
- Danna Paola as Estrella Herrera
- Yolanda Ventura as Dolores Herrera
- David Ostrosky as Dr. Bernardo Arias
- Beatriz Sheridan as Inspector Severina Estudillo
- Manuel "El Loco" Valdés as Polidoro
- Yuri as Regina Noriega
- Héctor Sáez as Dr. Elpidio
- Dacia González as Perpetua
- Jorge de Silva as Horacio
- Karla Álvarez as Jacinta Durán
- Roberto Palazuelos as Pantaleón Rendón
- Andrea Lagunes as Miranda Gallardo Noriega
- Anadela Losada as Carolina Muñiz
- Anastasia Acosta as Dalia
- Vielka Valenzuela as Valeria
- Jacqueline Arroyo as Thelma
- Aurora Molina as Eduviges
- Norma Lazareno as Adelina
- Elizabeth Dupeyrón as Fabiola Vda. de Robles
- Alejandra Procuna as Diamantina Robles
- Silvia Caos as Doña Porfiria Palacios
- Julio Vega as Garrido
- Guillermo Rivas as Eladio
- Violeta Isfel as Florencia Paz Ferrer
- Rosita Pelayo as Artemisa
- Zully Keith as Nina
- Martin Lazareno as Rubén
- Ricardo Chávez as Uriel
- Adalberto Martínez "Resortes" as Vagabundo
- Julio Monterde as Father Domingo
- Jacqueline Voltaire as Ballet's Director
- Lorena Velázquez as Donatella
- Rafael del Villar as Dolores's husband
- Lalo "El Mimo" as Mustafa
- Mario Carballido as Bruno
- Humberto Elizondo as Juez Mazagatos
- Maria Luisa Alcala as Mr. Alatriste's housekeeper
- Juan Carlos Serrán as Pietro Mortadello
- María Rubio as Mrs. Arredondo
- Julio Camejo as Científico
- René Casados as Mr. Cuéllar
- Jorge Van Rankin as Zopenko Karambasoft
- Jacqueline Bracamontes as The Fairy Treasures
- Claudia Ortega as Brigida
- Juan Carlos Casasola as Secundino
- Juan Ferrara as Mauricio Borbolla
- Katie Barberi as Dorina
- Juan Peláez as Lic. Arredondo
- Verónica Macías as Lic. Arredondo's secretary
- Lisette Morelos as Adriana Espinoza
- Raúl Magaña as Fabián Espinoza
- Aarón Hernán as Notario Sotomayor
- Marisol Mijares as Ines
- Amparo Garrido as Doña Luz
- Teo Tapia as Gerente Cardenas
- Claudio Báez as Evaristo Leal
- Lupita Lara as Cayetana Rubio de Leal
- Alejandro Ibarra as Octavio
- Anabel Gutiérrez as Pordiosera
- Juan Verduzco as Juez Tirado
- Archie Lafranco as Dimitri
- Jorge "Maromero" Páez as himself
