= Contra viento y marea (Mexican TV series) =

2005 Mexican telenovela

- Genre: Telenovela
- Created by: Kary Fajer
- Based on: La loba herida by Manuel Muñoz Rico
- Written by: Gabriela Ortigoza
- Directed by: Marta Luna; Salvador Garcini
- Starring: Marlene Favela; Sebastián Rulli; Adriana Fonseca; Azela Robinson; Kika Edgar; Ernesto D'Alessio; Armando Araiza; Alberto Estrella; Evita Muñoz "Chachita"; Beatriz Sheridan; Luis Couturier; Silvia Manríquez; Alexis Ayala
- Theme music composer: Mauricio Arriaga; Jorge Eduardo Murguía
- Opening theme: "Contra viento y marea" by Intocable
- Country of origin: Mexico
- Original language: Spanish
- No. of seasons: 1
- No. of episodes: 130

Production
- Executive producer: Nicandro Díaz González
- Producer: Pablo Noceda
- Production locations: Televisa San Ángel; Mexico City, Mexico; Manzanillo, Colima
- Cinematography: Ernesto Arreola; Alejandro Frutos
- Editors: Susana Valencia; Juan Alfredo Villarreal
- Camera setup: Multi-camera
- Running time: 41–44 minutes (eps 1–120); 21–22 minutes (eps 121–140)
- Production company: Televisa

Original release
- Network: Canal de las Estrellas
- Release: 25 April – 4 November 2005

Related
- Apuesta por un amor; Barrera de amor

Contra viento y marea (English: Against All Odds) is a Mexican telenovela produced by Nicandro Díaz González for Televisa in 2005.

On Monday, April 25, 2005, Canal de las Estrellas started broadcasting Contra viento y marea weekdays at 8:00pm, replacing Apuesta por un amor. The last episode was broadcast on Friday, November 4, 2005 with Barrera de amor replacing it on Monday, November 7, 2005. On Monday, September 12, 2005, Univisión started broadcasting it at 8pm.

The series stars Marlene Favela, Sebastián Rulli, Adriana Fonseca, Azela Robinson, Kika Edgar, Ernesto D'Alessio, Armando Araiza, Alberto Estrella, Evita Muñoz "Chachita", Beatriz Sheridan. Luis Couturier, Silvia Manríquez and Alexis Ayala.

The telenovela was the last acting role of Beatriz Sheridan, who died in 2006 from a heart attack.

== Plot ==
Natalia Ríos (Marlene Favela is a lovely young girl who lives with her aunt, Inés (Lucero Lander). Her aunt’s husband, Arcadio (Roberto Ballesteros), is a shameless man who tries to rape Natalia and ends up selling her into white slavery to a gang of thugs. One of them, Valente (Alberto Estrella), takes pity on the innocent young girl. He saves her and they both run away, but are soon found by the criminals. Valente confronts them to give Natalia a chance to escape and is badly wounded. Natalia is able to get away and goes back to her aunt, only to find her on her deathbed. Inés tells her that, from now on, she must live with Doña Carlota (Beatriz Sheridan) at the home of the wealthy Serrano family. When Natalia arrives at the mansion, Don Teodoro (Luis Couturier) and his daughter, Sandra (Adriana Fonseca), welcome her with open arms, but his wife, Apolonia (Azela Robinson), Doña Carlota’s daughter, treats her with contempt.

Sebastián (Sebastián Rulli) lives with his adoptive family: Amparo (Silvia Manríquez), who has always rejected him; her son, Eduardo (Ernesto D'Alessio), who loves and is loyal to Sebastián, thinking they are really brothers; and the grandmother, Doña Cruz (Evita Muñoz "Chachita"). One night, Eduardo is attacked by a drunkard and Sebastián defends him, leaving the attacker unconscious in the street. A street bum who witnessed the fight then robs and kills the man, but Sebastián is blamed for the murder and sent to prison.

Years later, Natalia and Eduardo become friends in college. She is truly fond of him, but only as a friend. Eduardo, however, falls madly in love with her. Sebastián is released for good behavior and meets Natalia during an embarrassing incident where he must defend her from his inebriated friends. Even though they haven’t met again after that first encounter, Natalia and Sebastián cannot stop thinking about each other and Eduardo and Sebastián do not realize that they have fallen in love with the same woman.

Sebastián is desperate because no one will give him a job, so he decides to try his luck in Mexico City. There, fate brings him face to face with Natalia once more and they finally confess their love for each other. Natalia promises to find him work at the Serrano family’s tuna cannery, where she herself is employed, and they both go back to Comala. Meanwhile, Apolonia is searching for the illegitimate son she had in her youth and gave up for adoption to Amparo’s husband. Amparo sees the chance to benefit her own child and tells Apolonia that Eduardo is her son. In an attempt to win his love, Apolonia gives him a job at the cannery and decides to make all his wishes come true. When she learns that Eduardo is in love with Natalia, Apolonia does everything in her power to force her to marry him, but Natalia’s love belongs to Sebastián and she will not give in to Apolonia’s pressure.

It is only when Eduardo falls gravely ill and is not expected to live long that Natalia must decide whether she should marry him out of compassion or be true to her heart and defend her love for Sebastian Against All Odds.

== Cast ==
=== Main ===
- Marlene Favela as Natalia Ríos Soler
  - Danna Paola as Child Natalia
- Sebastián Rulli as Sebastián Cárdenas Contreras
  - Ángel Mar as Child Sebastián
- Adriana Fonseca as Sandra Serrano Rudell
  - Daniela Aedo as Child Sandra
- Azela Robinson as Apolonia Rudell de Serrano
- Kika Edgar as Regina Campos / Luna Gitana
- Ernesto D'Alessio as Eduardo Cárdenas Contreras
  - Sebastián as Child Eduardo
- Armando Araiza as Imanol Balmaceda Sandoval
- Alberto Estrella as Valente Ortigoza
- Evita Muñoz "Chachita" as Doña Cruz Viuda de Cárdenas
- Beatriz Sheridan as Carlota Viuda de Rudell
- Luis Couturier as Teodoro Serrano
- Silvia Manríquez as Amparo Contreras Viuda de Cárdenas
- Alexis Ayala as Ricardo Sandoval

=== Recurring and guest stars ===
- Roberto Ballesteros as Arcadio
- Miguel Galván as Adán Pescador
- Julio Camejo as Veneno
- Juan Carlos Serrán as Commander Ruiz
- Mariana Ávila as Zarela Balmaceda Sandoval
- Marco Méndez as Renato Alday
- Yula Pozo as Tirsa
- Yolanda Ventura as Isabel
- Mike Biaggio as Cuco
- Nicky Mondellini as Constanza Sandoval Viuda de Balmaceda
- Carmen Amezcua as Lucía Campos
- Sylvia Suárez as Adelina
- Irina Areu as La Colorada
- Lucero Lander as Inés
- Federico Pizarro as Álvaro Campos
- Aleida Núñez as Perla
- Alex Sirvent as Chema
- Daniel Habiff as Frank Balmaceda Sandoval
- Uberto Bondoni as Almeja
- José Luis Cantú as Cheleque
- Luis Fernando Madriz as Benny
- Myrrah Saavedra as Yuraima
- Úrsula Montserrat as Rita
- Xorge Noble as El Tuerto
- Arturo Peniche as Nazario

== Awards ==
Year	Award	Category	Nominee(s)	Result
2005	TV Adicto Golden Awards	Best Female Villain	Azela Robinson	Won
2006	Bravo Awards	Best Leading Actor	Luis Couturier	Won
