= Pacto de amor =

Mexican telenovela

- Genre: Telenovela; Romance; Drama
- Created by: Marissa Garrido; Fernanda Villeli
- Directed by: Alfredo Saldaña
- Starring: Claudia Islas; Jorge Rivero; Lupita D'Alessio; Pilar Pellicer; Héctor Bonilla; Sergio Jiménez
- Country of origin: Mexico
- Original language: Spanish
- No. of episodes: 224

Production
- Executive producer: Ernesto Alonso
- Cinematography: Alfredo Saldaña
- Running time: 30 minutes
- Production company: Televisa

Original release
- Network: Canal de las Estrellas
- Release: 1977 – 1977

Related
- Marcha nupcial; Rina

Pacto de amor (English title: Covenant of love) is a Mexican telenovela produced by Ernesto Alonso for Televisa in 1977.

== Cast ==
- Claudia Islas as Delia
- Jorge Rivero as Damian
- Lupita D'Alessio as Julia
- Pilar Pellicer as Blanca
- Héctor Bonilla as Guillermo
- Sergio Jiménez as Alonso
- Miguel Macía as Rodolfo
- Susana Cabrera as Leonidas
- María Teresa Rivas as Ruth
- Carlos Amador as Margarito
- Carlos Argüelles as Federico
- Arturo Benavides as Sergio
- Odiseo Bichir as Guillermo
- Rocío Brambila as Mireya
- Ada Carrasco as Ernestina
- Manolo García as Miguel
- Jaime Garza
- Jaime González as Javier
- Simón Guevara as Alonso
- Aarón Hernán
- Ana Bertha Lepe as Margot
- Amalia Llergo as Alicia
- Ernesto Marin
- Mary Carmen Martínez as Julia
- Oscar Morelli
- Frank Moro as Federico
- Ignacio Rubiel as Ricardo
- Héctor Sáez as Padre Juan
- Patricia Tanus as Blanca
- Alejandro Ángeles as Damián
