= Rocío Banquells =

Mexican pop singer and actress

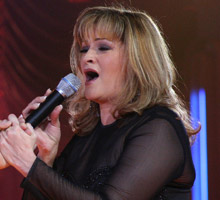
- Born: María del Rocío Banquells Núñez; 22 June 1958 (age 68); Monterrey, Nuevo León, Mexico
- Occupations: Singer, actress, politician
- Years active: 1970-present
- Spouses: Pedro Méndez (m. 1979; div. 1984) Jorge Berlanga (m. 1985; div. 2005)
- Children: 2
- Parent(s): Rafael Banquells; Dina de Marco
- Family: Sylvia Pasquel (half-sister); Stephanie Salas (half niece); Alfredo Adame (brother-in-law)
- Musical career
- Genres: Pop; operetta; ranchera; rock; ballads
- Instruments: Vocals; Mezzo-soprano
- Label: Universal

Federal Deputy from Mexico City's 14th district
- In office 1 September 2021 – 31 August 2024
- Preceded by: Alfonso Ramírez Cuéllar
- Succeeded by: Carlos Hernández Mirón

Personal details
- Party: Citizens' Movement (since 2022)
- Other political affiliations: PRD (until 2022)

Rocío Banquells (Spanish pronunciation: [roˈsi.o βaŋˈkels]; born María del Rocío Banquells Nuñez; 22 June 1958) is a Mexican pop singer, politician, and actress, best known for her work on television, the stage and cinema of Mexico and Latin America. Her mezzo voice is one of the most versatile voices from Mexico. She sings operetta, ranchera, rock, and ballads.

== Early life and career ==
Born in Monterrey, Nuevo León, Mexico, in 1958, Banquells is the daughter of Cuban actor and director Rafael Banquells and the actress Dina de Marco. She is half-sister of the actress Sylvia Pasquel (daughter of Rafael Banquells and Silvia Pinal). Her other siblings are Jose Manuel, Janette, Mary Paz, Ariadne and Rafael Jr.

Banquells began her career as a special guest in the 1968 Banquells's telenovela Gutierritoz. She moved to the stage in the early 1970s. In 1978 she starred in the musical Sound of Music along with the Mexican singer Lupita D'Alessio. Other stage performances of Rocío are in the Mexican versions of Grease, Evita, and Jesus Christ Superstar.

In 1979, Banquells starred in the Mexican telenovelas's international success Los ricos tambien lloran, alongside Verónica Castro. Banquells's other memorable TV performances are Bianca Vidal (1983) and La fiera (1984). She realized memorable interpretations especially in playing evil characters. In 1985 she began her musical career with the album Rocío Banquells, that includes the 1980s superhits Este hombre no se toca, Luna Mágica and Abrazame.

Banquells continued her musical career during the late 1980s and early 1990s. In 1997 a legal conflict caused the Banquells retirement for over 10 years. In 2006, Banquells returned in the Televisa reality show Cantando por un sueño, and in 2007 returned with a new album named Nací para ti, recorded live in the Teatro de la Ciudad in Mexico City. In the same year, she returned to TV in the telenovela Pasión. In 2009-2010 Banquells starred in the Mexican version of the successful musical Mamma Mia! as Donna.

In 2012, Banquells returned with the show Noches de Cabaret, along with the Mexican singers Lucía Méndez and Manoella Torres. For her work in the recording industry, stage and television Banquells' handprints and star have been embedded onto the Paseo de las Luminarias in Mexico City, alongside her half-sister Sylvia Pasquel.

== Political career ==
Banquells was a candidate from the Va por México coalition (made up of the National Action Party, the Institutional Revolutionary Party, and the Party of the Democratic Revolution, to which she belonged) for the 14th congressional district of Mexico City based in Tlalpan and was elected in June 2021 after obtaining nearly 40% of the votes. From September 2021 to August 2024 she was a federal deputy in the Congress of the Union. In February 2022 she switched from the PRD to the Citizens' Movement party.

== Personal life ==
Banquells was married twice. The first time to Pedro Mendez from 1979 to 1984, father of her daughter Pamela, and the second the producer Jorge Berlanga from 1985 to 2005, father of her son Rodrigo.

== Discography ==
- 1985: Rocío Banquells
- 1986: Con él
- 1987: Entrega Total - First Mariachi album.
- 1988: En el alambre
- 1989: Llorarás, llorarás
- 1990: Un sueño que alguna vez soñe - Includes the Banquells music performances of Broadway musicals like Evita and Jesus Christ Superstar).
- 1990: Escucha el infinito
- 1991: A mi viejo - Dedicated to her father.
- 1993: A la Virgen Morena - Tribute to the Virgin of Guadalupe.
- 1993: Genio y figura
- 1995: La fuerza del amor
- 1996: Coincidir:Grandes Exitos
- 1998: Recuerdos de un sentimiento
- 2007: Nací para tí - Live in the Teatro de la Ciudad.
- 2018: Siempre Regios (album Norteño)
- 2019: Recuerdos De Oro (album Homenaje a Sonia Lopez)

=== Collaborations ===
- No me puedo escapar de ti (1986) - Duet with La Mafia
- No me puedo escapar de ti (1987) - Duet with Luis Miguel
- La Bella y la Bestia (Beauty and the Beast) (1992) - Duet with Manuel Mijares
- Las numero uno (2007) - Duet with many female singers
- Todo por amor - (2008) Duet with Armando Manzanero

== Filmography ==
Year	Title	Role	Notes
1973	Los que ayudan a Dios	Valeria	Supporting Role
1973	Adorables Mujercitas	Roberta Ojeda Castro	Film
1974	Ha llegado una intrusa		Special Appearance
1975	Barata de primavera	Patricia	Supporting Role
1976	Mi hermana la Nena	Mónica	Co-Protagonist
1978	Ladronzuela	Gilda	Main Antagonist
1979-1980	Los ricos tambien lloran	Esther Izaguirre de Salvatierra	Main Antagonist
1980	Querer volar	Erika	Protagonist
1981-1982	Juegos del Destino	Sofía	Protagonist
1982-1983	Bianca Vidal	Mónica Rondán/Sandra	Main Antagonist
1983-1984	La Fiera	Brenda del Villar	Main Antagonist
1996-1997	Te dejare de Amar	Regina Sandor	Protagonist / Antagonist
2006	Cantando por un sueño	Herself	TV show, Winner
2006	Cantando por un sueño:Reyes De La Canción	Herself	TV show, 5th Place
2007-2008	Pasión	Ofelia de Márquez	Co-Protagonist
2008-2009	Cuidado con el Angel	Isabella Rojas	Antagonist
2010	Mujeres Asesinas 3	Elena	Episode:"Elena, protectora"
2010-2011	Cuando me enamoro	Josefina "Fina" Álvarez de Monterrubio	Main Antagonist
2013	Corazón Indomable	Carola Canseco	Antagonist
2016	Un camino hacia el destino	Lupe Gonzalo	Supporting Role
2020-2021	La mexicana y el güero	Maria Dolores Santoyo	Special Appearance

== Dubbing ==
Year	Title	Character
1979	Unico	Unico

== Theater ==
Year	Title	Role
1970	Cosas de mamá y papá	
1970	Los años imposibles	
1972	El día que secuestraron al Papa	
1973-74	Vaselina (Grease)	Licha
1975	La novicia rebelde (The Sound of Music)	Maria Von Trapp/Liesl
1975	Ciao Valentino	
1977	Lili	Lili
1978	El país de las sonrisas	
1979	Anita la huerfanita (Annie)	
1980	Aló!... Aló!... número equivocado	
1980	Godspell	
1981-82	Evita	Evita Perón
1982	Un gran final (A Chorus Line)	
1983	Jesuscristo Superestrella (Jesus Christ Superstar)	Mary Magdalene
1984	Todo se vale (Anything Goes)	
1997-98	Evita	Evita Perón
2007	Los monólogos de la vagina	
2008	La Bella y la Bestia, el musical de Broadway (Beauty and the Beast)	Mrs. Potss
2009-10	Mamma Mia!	Donna Sheridan

== Awards and nominations ==
=== Premios ACE ===
Year	Category	Result
1988	Rhythm artist most outstanding regional	Won
1991	Best album of the year	Won
1993	Best music video	Won
1993	Artist of ranchera music	Won

=== Premios TVyNovelas ===
Year	Category	Telenovela	Result
1984	Best Female Antagonist	Bianca Vidal	Won
1988	Best Female TV-Singer		Won
2011	Best Female Antagonist	Cuando me enamoro	Won
