= Gotita de amor =

Television series

- Genre: Telenovela
- Based on: Gotita de gente by Raymundo López
- Written by: Alberto Aridjis
- Screenplay by: Kary Fajer; Alberto Gómez
- Story by: Raymundo López
- Directed by: Arturo García Tenorio; Karina Duprez
- Starring: Laura Flores; Alejandro Ibarra; Andrea Lagunés
- Music by: Paco Navarrete; Nacho Rettally
- Opening theme: "Gotita de amor" by Tatiana
- Country of origin: Mexico
- Original language: Spanish
- No. of seasons: 1
- No. of episodes: 85

Production
- Executive producer: Nicandro Díaz González
- Production locations: Puebla de Zaragoza, Puebla; Mexico City
- Cinematography: Isabel Basurto; Héctor Márquez
- Editors: Alberto Cárdenas; Claudio González; Susana Valencia
- Camera setup: Multi-camera
- Production company: Televisa

Original release
- Network: Canal de las Estrellas
- Release: 3 August – 27 November 1998

Gotita de amor (Droplet of Love) (known as Chabelita in some territories) is a Mexican telenovela produced by Nicandro Díaz González for Televisa in 1998. Is a remake of 1978 Brazilian telenovela Pingo de gente.

On Monday 3 August 1998, Canal de las Estrellas started broadcasting Gotita de amor weekdays at 4:00pm, replacing Una luz en el camino. The last episode was broadcast on Friday, 27 November 1998 with El diario de Daniela replacing it the following Monday.

Laura Flores and Alejandro Ibarra starred as protagonists, while Pilar Montenegro, Isaura Espinoza, María Clara Zurita, Mercedes Molto, Raúl Araiza and Miguel de León starred as main antagonist. Andrea Lagunés starred as Isabel "Chabelita" Arredondo/García de Santiago, the main child character that the show's name refers to (the Droplet of Love).

== Plot ==
Isabel, affectionately called “Chabelita,” is abandoned at the door of an orphanage just days after her birth. Within its walls, she grows up enduring the relentless teasing of the other orphans and the strict discipline of the cruel director, Justa. One day, as a mean prank, her classmates present her with a forged birth certificate claiming her father’s name is Jesús García—a man they say is alive and resides in Mexico City. Clinging to the hope of finding a family and escaping her cruel environment, Chabelita escapes the orphanage and sets off for Mexico City to search for her supposed father.

Jesús, a humble street vendor, spends his days roaming the city streets while secretly dreaming of María Fernanda De Santiago, a refined woman from a world beyond his reach. He fell in love with her at first sight, though he knows she is an impossible love. One day, Chabelita unexpectedly appears, claiming him as her father. Despite knowing it is impossible for her to be his biological daughter, her charm and innocence win his heart. He welcomes her into his life and lovingly takes on the role of her father, forming a deep bond with the young girl, much to the annoyance of Jesus' original girlfriend Arcelia, who is obsessed with him and begins to dislike Chabelita for making him breaking up with her.

Meanwhile, María Fernanda, the daughter of the prominent Octavio De Santiago, has never given up searching for the baby girl who was taken from her at birth by her father. One fateful day, she encounters Chabelita and Jesús, becoming convinced that the sweet child is her long-lost daughter. She begins a fierce battle to reclaim her, unaware that love will ultimately set everything right.

Despite enduring mistreatment, neglect, and a lack of affection, Chabelita’s indomitable spirit remains unshaken. Her unyielding optimism and boundless kindness touch everyone she meets, earning her the nickname “Gotita de amor” (Little Drop of Love). With her unwavering determination, she ultimately fulfills her greatest dream: to have a home filled with love.

== Cast ==
- Laura Flores as María Fernanda García de Santiago
- Alejandro Ibarra as Jesús García Chávez
- Andrea Lagunés as Isabel "Chabelita" Arredondo
- Mercedes Molto as Lucrecia Samaniego de Sotomayor De Santiago
- Pilar Montenegro as Arcelia Olmos
- Evita Muñoz "Chachita" as Dólares "Lolita" Centella Correa
- Martha Roth as Dalila Sotomayor
- Irán Eory as Mother Superior
- Jaime Garza as Detective Romo
- Raúl Araiza as Guillermo Contreras
- Adalberto Martínez as Resortes
- Alicia Montoya as Trinidad "Trini"
- Martha Ofelia Galindo as Leocadia
- Carmen Amezcua as Sister Marcela
- Vanessa Angers as Coral Martinez
- Socorro Bonilla as Prudencia de Olmos
- Juan Carlos Casasola as Román Correa
- Rafael del Villar as Gilberto
- Carmelita González as Malbina
- Elizabeth Dupeyrón as Florencia
- Roberto Ramírez Garza as Plácido
- Pilar Escalante as Mirta
- Isaura Espinoza as Desdémona Mayoral
- Héctor "Cholo" Herrera as Zósimo Centella "Papadzul"
- Luisa Huertas as Sister Cándida
- Isabel Martínez "La Tarabilla" as Candelaria
- Raquel Morell as Bernarda de Santiago'
- Gerardo Murguía as Ricardo Sotomayor
- Héctor Sáez as Sócrates Olmos
- Vilma Traca as Sister Lucha
- María Clara Zurita as Justa Quiñones Monsalve
- Niurka Marcos as Constanza
- Guillermo Zarur as Clemente
- Adriana Fonseca as Paola
- Miguel de León as Ulises Arredondo Rivas
- Paulina Álvarez as Juliana
- Carla Ortiz as Karina
- Julio Alemán as Juez
- Guillermo Aguilar as Father Cristóbal
- Joaquin Cordero as Patriarca
- Eduardo Liñán as Lic. Constantino Contreras
- Paty Díaz as Lorena
- Daniela Luján as Daniela
- Ximena Sariñana as Enriqueta
- Paulina Martell as Genoveva
- Andrea Soberón as Flavia/Fabiola Rivera Ostos
- Michelle González as Nuria
- Priscilla Greco as Clara Antonia
- Monserrat de León as Clara Antonia (Ep.1)
- Annie del Castillo as Rosy
- Natasha Dupeyrón as Loreta
- Rosita Bouchot as Professor Leoncia
- Javier Herranz as Francisco
- Sergio Blass as Vilko
- Estela Barona as Yanka
- Ramón Menéndez as Augusto Arredondo
- Teo Tapia as Octavio de Santiago
- Vanessa Villela as Naida
- José Luis Cantú as Tacho
- Ricardo Vera as Evaristo
- Héctor Soberón as Dr. Alberto
- Ana Karla Kegel as Pilar
- Elena Paola Kegel as Socorro

== Broadcast in other countries ==
The series was aired in the Philippines through ABS-CBN in 1999-2000 as Chabelita. It was also aired in Indonesia through SCTV in 1999 as Impian Chabelita, with the dubbing and the soundtrack turned into Indonesian as the Indonesian duo singer Saskia and Geofanny.
