= Simplemente María (1989 TV series) =

- Genre: Telenovela; Romance; Drama
- Created by: Celia Alcántara
- Written by: Carlos Romero; Kary Fajer; Gabriela Ortigoza; Valeria Phillips; Rosario Velicia; Lourdes Barrios
- Directed by: Beatriz Sheridan; Arturo Ripstein; José Ambris; Arturo García Tenorio; Mercedes Pascual
- Starring: Victoria Ruffo; Manuel Saval; Jaime Garza; Silvia Derbez; Gabriela Goldsmith
- Theme music composer: José Antonio "Potro" Farías
- Opening theme: Simplemente María by Paco Navarrete
- Countries of origin: Mexico; Philippines
- Original languages: Spanish; Filipino (dubbed version)
- No. of episodes: 150; 148 (Philippine version)

Production
- Executive producer: Valentín Pimstein
- Producers: Verónica Pimstein; Salvador Mejía
- Production locations: Mexico City, Mexico; Paris, France; Miami, Florida, U.S. Long Beach, California, U.S.
- Cinematography: Ernesto Arreola; Gabriel Vázquez Bulmán; Manuel Ruiz Esparza
- Running time: 41-44 minutes (Mexico); 30 minutes (Philippines)
- Production companies: Televisa (Mexico); Radio Philippines Network (Philippines)

Original release
- Network: Canal de las Estrellas (Mexico)
- Release: October 16, 1989 – May 11, 1990
- Network: RPN 9 (Philippines)
- Release: October 14, 1996 – May 9, 1997

Related
- Simplemente María (1967); Simplemente María (1969); Simplemente María (1970); Simplemente María (1972); Rosa... de lejos (1980); Así son ellas (2002); Simplemente María (2015)

Simplemente María (English title: Simply María) is a Mexican telenovela produced by Valentín Pimstein for Televisa in 1989.

Victoria Ruffo, Manuel Saval and Jaime Garza starred as protagonists, while Gabriela Goldsmith starred as main antagonist.

== Cast ==
- Victoria Ruffo as María López de Carreño
- Manuel Saval as Juan Carlos del Villar Montenegro
- Jaime Garza as Víctor Carreño
- Silvia Derbez as Matilde Carreño
- Gabriela Goldsmith as Lorena del Villar Montenegro de Rivera
- Florencia Ferret as Claudia
- Sergio Acosta as Detective Augustín Zepeta
- María Almela as Ana López de Sotomayor
- Miguel Derbez as José Ignacio López (child)
- Jorge Poza as José Ignacio López (preteen)
- Toño Mauri as José Ignacio López (adult)
- Amairani as Laura Rivera del Villar de López
- Alejandro Aragón as Diego López
- Angélica Aragón as Gloria
- Raul Padilla "Choforo" as René #1
- Cesar Arias as René #2
- Roberto Ballesteros as Arturo D'Angelle
- Juan Carlos Barreto as Benito
- Vanessa Bauche as Julia Carreño (preteen)
- Porfirio Baz as Germán Carreño
- Marcelo Buquet as Dr. Fernando Torres
- Rafael Inclán as Don Chema
- Andrea Legarreta as Ivonne Ayala
- Frances Ondiviela as Natalia Preciado
- David Ostrosky as Rodrigo de Peñalvert, Count of Arenzo
- Roberto Palazuelos as Pedro Cuevas
- Angélica Rivera as Isabela de Peñalvert de López
- Claudio Baez as Gustavo del Villar
- Cecilia Camacho as Estela López de Reyes
- Constantino Costas as Clemente Reyes
- Rosa Carmina as Camelia Ramos
- Mauricio Ferrari as Dr. Luis Valadez
- Servando Manzetti as Dr. Alberto Rivera
- Lola Merino as Fernanda Amolinar de del Villar
- Karen Sentíes as Silvia Rebollar de Rivera
- Adriana Parra as Rita Fernández de López
- Mercedes Pascual as Constanza de Peñalvert
- Raquel Parot as Mother Carmela
- Roberto Vander as Lic. Rafael Hidalgo
- Rafael del Villar as Jacinto López
- Claudia Ortega as Nazaria Fernández
- Juan Bernardo Gasca as Marcos Carreño (preteen)
- Javier Herranz as Marcos Carreño
- Rocío Brambila as Julia Carreño
- Silvia Campos as Violeta Alvear
- Maya Mishalska as Ofelia
- Nicky Mondellini as Isabel, nurse in Dr. Valadez's clinic
- María Morett as Margarita López
- Tina Romero as Dr. Gabriela del Conde
- Gustavo Cosain as Don Nacho López
- Sergio Basañez as Jeane Claude Carre
- Carlos Bonavides as Dr. Rojas
- Eduardo Borja as Station boss
- Alberto González as Dr. Tomás
- Patricia Castro as Palmira #1
- Myrrha Saavedra as Palmira #2
- Sandra Félix as Mrs. Urquiaga
- Estela Furlong as Mrs. González
- Rodrigo Ramón as Germán Carreño (preteen)
- Evangelina Sosa as Perla "Perlita" Carreño (preteen)
- Lucy Reina as Perla "Perlita" Carreño
- Jose Maria Fernandez as Mauricio Egeyros
- Angelina Peláez as La Prieta
- Beatriz Olea as Yolanda López
- Ricardo Vera as Teniente Ornelas
- Raul Nava as Count of Arenzo's Butlet
- Celia Suarez as Doctor Chief in Dr. Valadez's clinic
- Ana Iris Bosch as Doctor in Valadez's clinic
- Pilar Souza as Lorena's nurse
- Irma Torres as Crisanta Fernandez
- Jacqueline Voltaire as Nancy Williams
- Tony Rodríguez as Dr. Gonzalo Arviso Arismendi
- Víctor Carpinteiro as Deaf-mute servant of Rosendo and Camelia
- Antonio Rangel as Enrique Núñez
- Charly Valentino as Teniente Acuña
- Arath de la Torre as Michell
- Juan Ignacio Aranda as Pablo Alvear
- Silvia Suarez as Amelia Alvear
- Ligia Escalante as Nadya
- Eva Calvo as Doña Tulia
