= Arturo Peniche =

Mexican actor (born 1962)

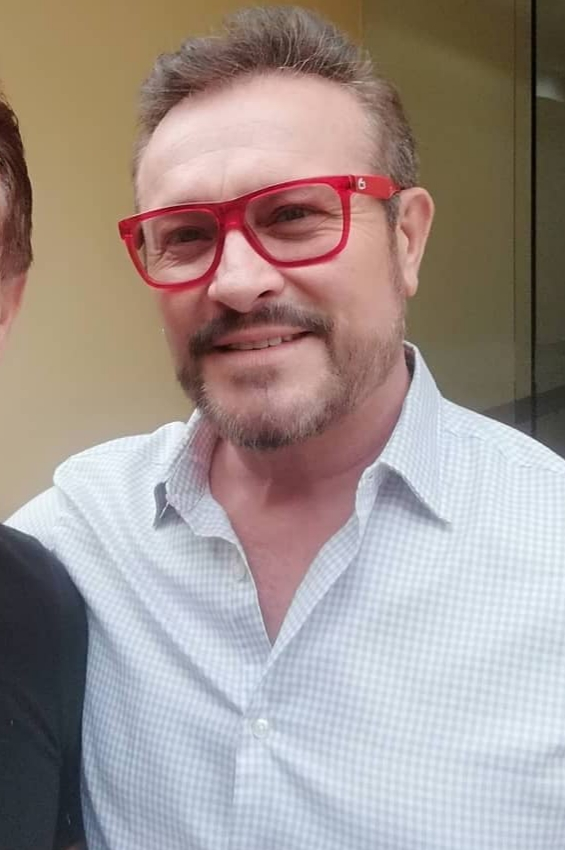
- Peniche in 2019
- Born: Arturo Delgadillo Peniche; May 17, 1962 (age 63); Mexico City, Mexico
- Occupation: Actor
- Years active: 1982-present
- Spouse: Gaby Ortiz (m. 1982)
- Children: Brandon Peniche

Arturo Peniche (born Arturo Delgadillo Peniche on May 17, 1962) is a Mexican telenovela actor who gained popularity in Latin America during the 1990s. He is the brother of actor Flavio Peniche, who appeared in the telenovela La Traición.

== Biography ==
Peniche struggled as an actor for many years before achieving stardom. Although he graduated from the renowned Televisa school of actors, he competed against prominent figures such as Guillermo Capetillo, Andrés García, Jaime Garza, and Salvador Pineda, among others.

During this period, Peniche appeared in several commercials, an experience that later helped him secure leading roles in Televisa's telenovelas. One commercial, in which he sold bracelets said to have special powers, made him somewhat famous in Puerto Rico and other parts of Latin America.

His breakthrough came in 1990 when he filmed the telenovela Emperatriz in Venezuela and later starred in María María, his only leading role in a Venezuelan soap opera. Having gained significant popularity there, Peniche returned to Mexico with a new contract from Televisa. In 1991, he played the male antagonist in Valeria y Maximiliano, marking his first successful soap opera in his home country.

His fame increased in 1992 when he participated in Maria Mercedes, a soap opera which was a huge international hit and launched the career of Thalía. After Maria Mercedes, Peniche took a break from filming telenovelas because his fame had reached levels that he didn't expect. However, he was still constantly on the public eye, thanks in part to magazines such as TV Novelas and others.

In 1995, he returned, filming a soap named Morelia, which was co-produced by Univision and Televisa. Parts of Morelia were filmed in the United States, and it was also a public favorite. For the next several years, he continued to make major international hits such as La usurpadora and La Intrusa with Venezuelan actress Gaby Spanic, and Siempre te Amare, among others. Contrary to the first time that he became famous, Peniche felt more mature and comfortable with fame after his comeback; this helped him continue on landing top roles at Televisa's main soaps.

In 2004, Arturo joins the cast of the telenovela Corazones al Limite, produced by Nicandro Diaz Gonzalez and Roberto Hernandez. In 2005 he was invited to participate in the thick and thin telenovela produced by Nicandro Diaz González in which Nazario plays. That same year he plays 'Antonio' in Alborada, a telenovela produced by Carla Estrada, with Lucero and Fernando Colunga.

In 2007 plays the 'Governor Fernando Sánchez de Moncada' in Zorro, la espada y la rosa, the first adaptation of telenovela Zorro legend and the first Spanish version. This telenovela is starring Christian Meier and Marlene Favela. Then he joined the filming Victoria, telenovela starring alongside Victoria Ruffo and Mauricio Ochmann.

Participated in the soap El Nombre del amor with Victoria Ruffo, Leticia Calderon, Laura Flores, among others. In 2010 he participated in the soap opera Nina de mi corazon where he plays Max and shares credits with Maribel Guardia, Erick Elias, Paulina Goto, among others.

In 2010 and 2011 participated in Cuando me enamoro soap opera with Silvia Navarro and Juan Soler. In 2012-13 he's back in soap opera, Qué bonito amor, plays the part Fernando Beltran "El Mil Amores" with Danna García, Jorge Salinas, Pablo Montero, Juan Ferrara, Victor Norigea, Malliany Marin and Karla Alvarez, among others. In 2013 it makes a special participation in the soap opera La tempestad with William Levy, Ximena Navarrete, Nora Salinas and Maria Sorte. In 2014 co-starring in his first comedic soap opera Qué pobres tan ricos, which gives life to Nepomuceno, a comic character who is far from his previous characters in his melodramas. This time he shares credit beside Zuria Vega, Jaime Camil, Manuel "Flaco" Ibáñez, Sylvia Pasquel, Mark Tacher and Ingrid Martz. Later he participated in the soap opera La malquerida with Victoria Ruffo, Christian Meier and Ariadne Diaz.

In 2015, after several starring roles, he gets its first antagonistic debut since 2007, in the soap opera A que no me dejas, remake of what was in 1988 the telenovela Amor en silencio, playing Gonzalo Murat. Shares credit with Leticia Calderon, Camila Sodi, Osvaldo Benavides, Alejandra Barros, Salvador Zerboni, Alfonso Dosal and Laura Carmine.

== Filmography ==
=== Films ===
Year	Title	Role	Notes	Ref.
1990	Traficantes del vicio		Video short	
1990	Prisioneros de la selva			
1990	El fiscal de hierro 2: La venganza de Ramona			
1990	La mujer judicial	Aaron		
1990	Entre la fe y la muerte			
1991	Amor y venganza			
1992	El tigre de la frontera			
1994	La asesinadita			
1996	Trébol negro			
1997	Pacas de a kilo			
1998	Cabaret mortal		Video short	
1998	Búsqueda implacable			
1999	Sendero mortal II			
1999	Stuart Little	Carlos		
1999	Maldito amor: Demasiado tarde			
1999	El señor de los cerros	Diogenes		
2003	Secuestro crimen y castigo			
2003	La hora pico: El reventón		Television film	
2004	Narco cabrón, federal mas chingón		Video short	

=== Television ===
Year	Title	Role	Notes
1982-83	Chispita		Television debut
1984	Principessa		Recurring role
1985-86	Vivir un poco	Adrián Merisa Obregón	Co-lead role
1986	Monte calvario	Gustavo Seckerman	Lead role
1987	La indomable	Miguel Echanove	Lead role
1988	Amor en silencio	Fernando Silva	Lead role
1989	María María	Esteban Araujo	Lead role
1990	Emperatriz	David	Supporting role
1991-92	Valeria y Maximiliano	Patricio del Val	Main cast
1992-93	María Mercedes	Jorge Luis del Olmo Morantes	Lead role
1995	María José	Carlos Alberto Almazán	Lead role
1995-96	Morelia	José Enrique Campos Miranda	Lead role
1996	Marisol	Juan Vicente Morelos	Guest star
1997	El alma no tiene color	Lisandro del Álamo	Lead role
1998	Vivo por Elena	Héctor	Recurring role
1998	¿Qué nos pasa?		1 episode
1998	La Usurpadora	Lic. Edmundo Serrano	Guest star
1998-1999	Soñadoras	José Luis Dueñas	Lead role
1999-2000	Cuento de Navidad	Dr. Antonio	Supporting role
1999-2000	Mujeres engañadas	Don Alejandro Lizárraga	Main cast
2000	Siempre te amaré	Luis Miguel Garrai	Lead role
2000	Amigos x siempre	Himself	Guest star
2001	Carita de ángel	Dr. Montemayor	Guest star
2001	La intrusa	Carlos Alberto Junquera Brito	Lead role
2002	Entre el amor y el odio	Fabio Sacristán	Guest star
2004	Corazones al límite	Álvaro Riverol	Lead role
2005	Contra viento y marea	Nazario	Recurring role
2005–2006	Alborada	Antonio de Guzmán	Main cast
2006	Heridas de amor	Alfredo Luque	Guest star
2007	El Zorro, la espada y la rosa	Fernando Sánchez de Moncada	Main cast
2007-08	Victoria	Enrique Mendoza	Main cast
2008–2009	En nombre del amor	Father Juan Cristóbal Gamboa / Monseñor Juan Cristóbal Gamboa	Main cast
2010	Niña de mi corazón	Máximo Arrioja	Main cast
2010–2011	Cuando me enamoro	Monseñor Juan Cristóbal Gamboa	Guest star
2012–2013	Qué bonito amor	Fernando Beltran "El Mil Amores"	Main cast
2013	La tempestad	Ariel Reverte	6 episodes
2013–2014	Qué pobres tan ricos	Nepomuceno Escandiondas "El Rey del Plátano"	167 episodes
2014	La malquerida	Héctor Robledo	Main cast; 55 episodes
2015-2016	A que no me dejas	Don Gonzalo Murat Cervantes	Main cast
2016	Mujeres de negro	Bruno Borghetti	Main cast
2017	El vuelo de la Victoria	Braulio Zavala	Recurring role; 63 episodes
2017	La Rosa de Guadalupe	Roberto	Guest; 1 episode
2018	Tenías que ser tú	Ezequiel Pineda	Main cast
2018	Tres Milagros	Colonel Ulices Suárez	Guest star
2019	Silvia Pinal, frente a ti	Luis G. Pinal	Recurring role
2019	La reina soy yo	Edgar	Recurring role
2019	Cita a ciegas	Federico Salazar	Main cast
2019	Preso No. 1	Pedro Islas	Main cast
2021	Fuego ardiente	comandante Alfonso Juárez	Main cast
2022	Amor dividido	Alejo Núñez	Main cast
2022	Mi secreto	Ernesto Lascuráin	Main cast
2024	Amor amargo	Enrique Olivares	Main cast
2024	El Señor de los Cielos	Flavio San Román	Guest star
2026	Mi rival	Gustavo	Main cast

== Discography ==
- Mi amor anda libre (2002)
- Bésame en la boca (2004)
- Infiel (2014)
- Bandera blanca (2017)

== Awards and nominations ==
=== TVyNovelas Awards ===
Year	Category	Telenovela	Result
1986	Best Male Revelation	Vivir un poco	Won
1986	Best Young Lead Actor	Vivir un poco	Nominated
1989	Best Lead Actor	Amor en silencio	Nominated
1993	Best Lead Actor	María Mercedes	Won
2010	Best Lead Actor	En Nombre del Amor	Nominated
2015	Best Co-Star Actor	Qué pobres tan ricos	Nominated
2016	Best Leading Actor	A que no me dejas	Won
2018	Best Leading Actor	Tenías que ser tú	Nominated

=== Premios ACE (New York) ===
Year	Category	Telenovela	Result
1996	Best Lead Actor	María José	Won
2010	Best Actor Co-acting	En Nombre del Amor	Won

=== Premios El Heraldo de México ===
Year	Category	Telenovela	Result
1996	Best Actor	María José	Won
2002	Best Actor	La Intrusa	Won

=== Premios People en Español ===
Year	Category	Telenovela	Result
2009	Best Actor	En Nombre del Amor	Nominated
