= Dina de Marco =

Mexican actress and television director

- Born: Dinazar Nuñez Jimenez; July 6, 1937; Mexico City
- Died: June 17, 1998 (aged 60); Mexico City
- Occupations: Actress, director
- Years active: 1958-1998
- Spouse: Rafael Banquells (m. 1955; died 1990)
- Children: 5, including Rocío Banquells

Dina de Marco (née Dinazar Nuñez Jimenez; July 6, 1937 – June 17, 1998) was a Mexican actress and television director. She studied acting in the Academy of Andrés Soler.

== Biography ==
Dina de Marco started her career as an actress in 1958, and went on to appear in over 20 soap operas, including success as La Pícara Soñadora, with the late Irán Eory, Eduardo Palomo and Mariana Levy in 1991, Alondra in 1995, Sentimientos Ajenos in 1996. Her last soap opera, Esmeralda, was made in 1997.

She was a wife of the actor and director Rafael Banquells. Her children are José Manuel, Rocío, Janette, Mary Paz, Rafael Jr. and Ariadne. She died of cancer on 17 June 1998.

== Filmography ==
=== Telenovelas ===
Year	Title	Role	Notes
1958	Gutierritos	Anita	Supporting Role
1960	Murallas blancas		
1961	Divorciadas		
1964	Cumbres borrascosas		
1965	Tu eres un extraño	Blanca	
1967	Felipa Sánchez, la soldadera	Rosario	
1969	El ruiseñor mexicano	Amalia	Supporting Role
1978	Mamá Campanita	Lucero	
1978	Santa		
1978	Ladronzuela		
1980	El árabe	Yadira	Supporting Role
1982-83	Bianca Vidal	Guillermina	Supporting Role
1982-83	Chispita		
1984	Aprendiendo a vivir	Perla	
1984-86	Principessa	Virginia	Supporting Role
1989	El cristal empañado	Paulina	Supporting Role
1989-90	Carrusel		
1991	La picara soñadora	Doña Bertha	Supporting Role
1991	Madres egoístas	Jacinta Arriaga	Supporting Role
1995	Alondra	Trini Gómez	Supporting Role
1996-97	Sentimientos ajenos	Donata	Supporting Role
1997	Esmeralda	Crisanta	Supporting Role

=== Films ===
Year	Title	Role
1958	Pepito y los robachicos	
1961	La comezón del amor	
1962	El espejo de la bruja	Elena
1962	Los secretos del sexo débil	

=== Director ===
Year	Title
1989	Dias sin luna
1991	Carrusel de las Americas
1992	Sesame Street (Mexican version)
