= Cuento de Navidad =

Mexican telenovela

- Title card
- Genre: Telenovela
- Created by: Charles Dickens
- Based on: A Christmas Carol by Charles Dickens
- Written by: Alba Garcia; Salvador Jarabo
- Story by: Charles Dickens
- Directed by: Alfredo Gurrola; Héctor Márquez
- Theme music composer: Maryté Gutiérrez; Manuel Ángel Rodríguez; Roberto Sánchez
- Country of origin: Mexico
- Original language: Spanish
- No. of seasons: 1
- No. of episodes: 15

Production
- Executive producer: Eugenio Cobo
- Producers: Ignacio Ortiz; Alejandro Palacios
- Editors: Martin Márquez; Héctor Márquez
- Production company: Televisa

Original release
- Network: Canal de las Estrellas
- Release: December 20, 1999 – January 7, 2000

Cuento de Navidad (English: A Christmas Carol), is a Mexican telenovela produced by Eugenio Cobo for Televisa in 1999. It is an adaptation of the 1843 eponymous novel by the famed English writer Charles Dickens.

== Notable cast ==
- Luz María Aguilar as Doña Petra
- Julio Alemán as Severo Rubiales Conde
- Chantal Andere as Beatriz "Betty"
- Eduardo Santamarina as Angel
- María Sorté as María
- Karla Álvarez as Miriam
- Leticia Calderón as Spirit of Christmas Yet to Come
- Itatí Cantoral as Sebring Cirrus
- Fernando Colunga as Jaime Rodríguez Coder
- Luis Couturier as Fernando Soto del Monte
- Laura Flores as An angel (The pretty woman)
- Susana González as Miní
- Eleazar Gómez as Kevin
- Edith González as Josefina Coder
- Rafael Inclán as Pavón
- Aaron Hernan as Don Leonardo
- Mauricio Islas as Edmundo Soto
- Eugenio Derbez as Nurse
- Arath de la Torre as José
- Ernesto Laguardia as Miguel
- Andrea Lagunés as Angel
- Juan Peláez as Santa Claus
- Mariana Levy as Guadalupe "Lupita"
- Pedro Armendáriz Jr.
- Nuria Bages
- Roberto Ballesteros
- Luis Bayardo
- Ricardo Chávez
- Eric del Castillo
- Alberto Estrella
- Ana Layevska
- Ivonne Montero
- Adriana Nieto
- Manuel Ojeda
- Arturo Peniche

== See also ==
- List of Christmas films
