= List of Amores verdaderos episodes =

Amores verdaderos (English: True Love) is a Mexican telenovela produced by Nicandro Díaz González for Televisa and premiered by Canal de las Estrellas in September 2012. It is based on the Mexican telenovela Amor en custodia, which was produced in 2005 by TV Azteca.

== History ==
Principal photography of Amores verdaderos officially started on July 23, 2012 and concluded on April 30, 2013. It is also the first telenovela to have 3-hour finale presentation with commercials. On September 3, 2012, Canal de las Estrellas started broadcasting Amores verdaderos weeknights at 9:30pm, replacing Abismo de pasión. The last episode was broadcast on May 12, 2013, with La tempestad replacing it the following day.

Univision confirmed a prime-time broadcast of Amores verdaderos on October 10, 2012. On November 7, Univision started broadcasting Amores verdaderos weeknights at 9pm/8c, replacing Abismo de pasión. The last episode was broadcast on July 28, 2013 at 8pm/7c, with La tempestad replacing it the following day.

== Series overview ==
Season	Episodes	Originally released	
Season	Episodes	First released	Last released
1	181	September 3, 2012	May 12, 2013
Special		May 12, 2013	

== Episodes ==
No.	Title	Directed by	Original release date	US air date	Viewers (millions)
1	"Secuestro"	Nicandro Díaz González	September 3, 2012	November 7, 2012	26.7
2	"Propuesta de trabajo"	Nicandro Díaz González	September 4, 2012	November 8, 2012	27.6
3	"En prisión"	Nicandro Díaz González	September 5, 2012	November 9, 2012	27.6
4	"Despedida familiar"	Nicandro Díaz González	September 6, 2012	November 12, 2012	27.7
5	"Plan de renuncia"	Nicandro Díaz González	September 7, 2012	November 13, 2012	25.8
6	"Sufre de anemia"	Nicandro Díaz González	September 10, 2012	November 14, 2012	29.8
7	"Súplicas"	Nicandro Díaz González	September 11, 2012	November 15, 2012	27.0
8	"Fuga frustrada"	Nicandro Díaz González	September 12, 2012	November 16, 2012	27.0
9	"Pide perdón"	Nicandro Díaz González	September 13, 2012	November 19, 2012	27.5
10	"Infierno terrenal"	Nicandro Díaz González	September 14, 2012	November 20, 2012	26.8
11	"Nueva amante"	Nicandro Díaz González	September 17, 2012	November 21, 2012	25.8
12	"Dolor de hija"	Nicandro Díaz González	September 18, 2012	November 22, 2012	25.8
13	"Amorío al descubierto"	Nicandro Díaz González	September 19, 2012	November 23, 2012	26.5
14	"Liliana descubierta"	Nicandro Díaz González	September 20, 2012	November 26, 2012	27.0
15	"Celos y violencia"	Nicandro Díaz González	September 21, 2012	November 27, 2012	25.5
16	"Claustrofobia"	Nicandro Díaz González	September 24, 2012	November 28, 2012	26.5
17	"Defensor del abuso"	Nicandro Díaz González	September 25, 2012	November 29, 2012	28.0
18	"Defensor del abuso"	Nicandro Díaz González	September 26, 2012	November 30, 2012	29.0
19	"Nikki secuestrada"	Nicandro Díaz González	September 27, 2012	December 3, 2012	28.0
20	"Culpable del secuestro"	Nicandro Díaz González	September 28, 2012	December 4, 2012	26.0
21	"Rescate"	Nicandro Díaz González	October 1, 2012	December 5, 2012	28.0
22	"Traición y venganza"	Nicandro Díaz González	October 2, 2012	December 6, 2012	27.0
23	"Primer beso"	Nicandro Díaz González	October 3, 2012	December 7, 2012	28.6
24	"Nikki vs. Liliana"	Nicandro Díaz González	October 4, 2012	December 10, 2012	27.8
25	"Enfermedad al descubierto"	Nicandro Díaz González	October 5, 2012	December 11, 2012	27.8
26	"Despedida definitiva"	Nicandro Díaz González	October 8, 2012	December 12, 2012	26.9
27	"Amor consumado"	Nicandro Díaz González	October 9, 2012	December 13, 2012	26.7
28	"Victoria confronta a Nelson"	Nicandro Díaz González	October 10, 2012	December 14, 2012	27.6
29	"La hipócrita de Kendra"	Nicandro Díaz González	October 11, 2012	December 17, 2012	26.8
30	"Celos y revelaciones"	Nicandro Díaz González	October 12, 2012	December 18, 2012	24.7
31	"Chismes y sufrimiento"	Nicandro Díaz González	October 15, 2012	December 19, 2012	27.0
32	"Cuadro al descubierto"	Nicandro Díaz González	October 16, 2012	December 20, 2012	25.6
33	"Victoria corre a Arriaga"	Nicandro Díaz González	October 17, 2012	December 21, 2012	29.0
34	"Situación incómoda"	Nicandro Díaz González	October 18, 2012	December 24, 2012	27.4
35	"Cita musical"	Nicandro Díaz González	October 19, 2012	December 25, 2012	27.3
36	"Reencuentro lejano"	Nicandro Díaz González	October 22, 2012	December 26, 2012	26.6
37	"Liliana en ridículo"	Nicandro Díaz González	October 23, 2012	December 27, 2012	26.9
38	"Trampa romántica"	Nicandro Díaz González	October 24, 2012	December 28, 2012	27.5
39	"Reunión inesperada"	Nicandro Díaz González	October 25, 2012	January 7, 2013	27.4
40	"Striptease"	Nicandro Díaz González	October 26, 2012	January 8, 2013	25.9
41	"Renuncia y rechazo"	Nicandro Díaz González	October 29, 2012	January 9, 2013	27.1
42	"Propuesta indecorosa"	Nicandro Díaz González	October 30, 2012	January 10, 2013	26.3
43	"Enfrentamiento y recompensa"	Nicandro Díaz González	October 31, 2012	January 11, 2013	25.5
44	"Amiga y amante"	Nicandro Díaz González	November 1, 2012	January 12, 2013	25.1
45	"Sufrimiento de madre"	Nicandro Díaz González	November 2, 2012	January 13, 2013	24.4
46	"Carrera de caballos"	Nicandro Díaz González	November 5, 2012	January 14, 2013	26.4
47	"Matrimonio destrozado"	Nicandro Díaz González	November 6, 2012	January 15, 2013	27.7
48	"Guardaespaldas enamorado"	Nicandro Díaz González	November 7, 2012	January 16, 2013	26.8
49	"Divorcio solicitado"	Nicandro Díaz González	November 8, 2012	January 17, 2013	28.0
50	"Petición de padre"	Nicandro Díaz González	November 9, 2012	January 18, 2013	27.6
51	"Malentendido laboral"	Nicandro Díaz González	November 12, 2012	January 21, 2013	27.1
52	"Muerte falsa"	Nicandro Díaz González	November 13, 2012	January 22, 2013	27.6
53	"Chantaje amoroso"	Nicandro Díaz González	November 14, 2012	January 23, 2013	25.8
54	"El regalo"	Nicandro Díaz González	November 15, 2012	January 24, 2013	25.6
55	"Arrepentimiento"	Nicandro Díaz González	November 16, 2012	January 25, 2013	25.9
56	"Posible accidente"	Nicandro Díaz González	November 19, 2012	January 28, 2013	26.0
57	"Matrimonio de apariencia"	Nicandro Díaz González	November 20, 2012	January 29, 2013	24.9
58	"Sentimientos cuestionados"	Nicandro Díaz González	November 21, 2012	January 30, 2013	27.3
59	"Campaña en riesgo"	Nicandro Díaz González	November 22, 2012	January 31, 2013	N/A
60	"Beso impuesto"	Nicandro Díaz González	November 23, 2012	February 1, 2013	26.3
61	"Descubiertos"	Nicandro Díaz González	November 26, 2012	February 4, 2013	26.5
62	"Sospechas confirmadas"	Nicandro Díaz González	November 27, 2012	February 5, 2013	26.0
63	"Predicción"	Nicandro Díaz González	November 28, 2012	February 6, 2013	25.4
64	"Revelaciones del pasado"	Nicandro Díaz González	November 29, 2012	February 7, 2013	24.1
65	"Encuentro incómodo"	Nicandro Díaz González	November 30, 2012	February 8, 2013	25.0
66	"Celos injustificados"	Nicandro Díaz González	December 3, 2012	February 11, 2013	25.6
67	"Futura relación"	Nicandro Díaz González	December 4, 2012	February 12, 2013	26.4
68	"Amante enamorada"	Nicandro Díaz González	December 5, 2012	February 13, 2013	N/A
69	"Consejos de amiga"	Nicandro Díaz González	December 6, 2012	February 14, 2013	N/A
70	"Citas de guardaespaldas"	Nicandro Díaz González	December 7, 2012	February 15, 2013	N/A
71	"Psicóloga descubierta"	Nicandro Díaz González	December 10, 2012	February 18, 2013	N/A
72	"Fiesta sorpresa"	Nicandro Díaz González	December 11, 2012	February 19, 2013	N/A
73	"Culpa de padres"	Nicandro Díaz González	December 12, 2012	February 20, 2013	N/A
74	"Amenaza de muerte"	Nicandro Díaz González	December 13, 2012	February 21, 2013	N/A
75	"Amenaza de muerte"	Nicandro Díaz González	December 14, 2012	February 22, 2013	23.4
76	"Información personal"	Nicandro Díaz González	December 17, 2012	February 25, 2013	24.9
77	"Incrédula"	Nicandro Díaz González	December 18, 2012	February 26, 2013	N/A
78	"El regreso de Roy"	Nicandro Díaz González	December 19, 2012	February 27, 2013	N/A
79	"Autora enamorada"	Nicandro Díaz González	December 20, 2012	February 28, 2013	N/A
80	"Exhumación"	Nicandro Díaz González	December 21, 2012	March 1, 2013	N/A
81	"Infarto"	Nicandro Díaz González	December 24, 2012	March 4, 2013	N/A
82	"Tercer hija"	Nicandro Díaz González	December 25, 2012	March 5, 2013	N/A
83	"Revelación"	Nicandro Díaz González	December 26, 2012	March 6, 2013	N/A
84	"Plan de embarazo"	Nicandro Díaz González	December 27, 2012	March 7, 2013	23.4
85	"Plática pendiente"	Nicandro Díaz González	December 28, 2012	March 8, 2013	24.9
86	"La madre de Guzmán"	Nicandro Díaz González	December 31, 2012	March 11, 2013	N/A
87	"Otra hermana"	Nicandro Díaz González	January 1, 2013	March 12, 2013	19.1
88	"Bendición de boda"	Nicandro Díaz González	January 2, 2013	March 13, 2013	25.4
89	"Futura infidelidad"	Nicandro Díaz González	January 3, 2013	March 14, 2013	25.7
90	"Desaparición nocturna"	Nicandro Díaz González	January 4, 2013	March 15, 2013	24.5
91	"Desinterés del pasado"	Nicandro Díaz González	January 7, 2013	March 18, 2013	26.9
92	"Amante y maestra"	Nicandro Díaz González	January 8, 2013	March 19, 2013	25.8
93	"Compromiso de amor"	Nicandro Díaz González	January 9, 2013	March 20, 2013	28.5
94	"Amor reconocido"	Nicandro Díaz González	January 10, 2013	March 21, 2013	28.5
95	"Strippers"	Nicandro Díaz González	January 11, 2013	March 22, 2013	26.0
96	"Extorsiona a Kendra"	Nicandro Díaz González	January 14, 2013	March 25, 2013	26.6
97	"Confronta a Kendra"	Nicandro Díaz González	January 15, 2013	March 26, 2013	28.0
98	"Cambio de guardaespaldas"	Nicandro Díaz González	January 16, 2013	March 27, 2013	29.4
99	"Tomasina secuestrada"	Nicandro Díaz González	January 17, 2013	March 28, 2013	28.0
100	"Le disparan a Victoria"	Nicandro Díaz González	January 18, 2013	March 29, 2013	28.9
101	"Arriaga se siente culpable"	Nicandro Díaz González	January 21, 2013	April 1, 2013	28.0
102	"Engaño sexual"	Nicandro Díaz González	January 22, 2013	April 2, 2013	28.7
103	"Nueva culpable"	Nicandro Díaz González	January 23, 2013	April 3, 2013	28.7
104	"Informe personal"	Nicandro Díaz González	January 24, 2013	April 4, 2013	27.0
105	"Sentimientos a flote"	Nicandro Díaz González	January 25, 2013	April 5, 2013	25.3
106	"Posible regreso"	Nicandro Díaz González	January 28, 2013	April 8, 2013	28.0
107	"Prueba de vestido"	Nicandro Díaz González	January 29, 2013	April 9, 2013	26.6
108	"Carta de despedida"	Nicandro Díaz González	January 30, 2013	April 10, 2013	25.7
109	"Asesinar a Cristina"	Nicandro Díaz González	January 31, 2013	April 11, 2013	27.0
110	"Vida en peligro"	Nicandro Díaz González	February 1, 2013	April 12, 2013	26.5
111	"Despedida familiar"	Nicandro Díaz González	February 4, 2013	April 15, 2013	27.1
112	"Reencuentro en el velorio"	Nicandro Díaz González	February 5, 2013	April 16, 2013	27.1
113	"Hija decepcionada"	Nicandro Díaz González	February 6, 2013	April 17, 2013	26.6
114	"Cena de compromiso"	Nicandro Díaz González	February 7, 2013	April 18, 2013	27.6
115	"Victoria en evidencia"	Nicandro Díaz González	February 8, 2013	April 19, 2013	27.6
116	"Origen de Liliana"	Nicandro Díaz González	February 11, 2013	April 22, 2013	26.7
117	"Elección de amor"	Nicandro Díaz González	February 12, 2013	April 23, 2013	26.7
118	"Arriaga regresa"	Nicandro Díaz González	February 13, 2013	April 24, 2013	27.6
119	"Verdadera madre"	Nicandro Díaz González	February 14, 2013	April 25, 2013	27.4
120	"Carta reveladora"	Nicandro Díaz González	February 15, 2013	April 26, 2013	26.7
121	"Chantaje a suegro"	Nicandro Díaz González	February 18, 2013	April 29, 2013	29.2
122	"Roy descubierto"	Nicandro Díaz González	February 19, 2013	April 30, 2013	29.9
123	"Indecisión en la boda"	Nicandro Díaz González	February 20, 2013	May 1, 2013	29.6
124	"Información de interés"	Nicandro Díaz González	February 21, 2013	May 2, 2013	29.4
125	"Amor interrumpido"	Nicandro Díaz González	February 22, 2013	May 3, 2013	27.0
126	"Rebelión de amante"	Nicandro Díaz González	February 25, 2013	May 6, 2013	28.0
127	"Nikki inconsciente"	Nicandro Díaz González	February 26, 2013	May 7, 2013	29.6
128	"Revelación forzada"	Nicandro Díaz González	February 27, 2013	May 8, 2013	29.7
129	"Revelaciones dolorosas"	Nicandro Díaz González	February 28, 2013	May 9, 2013	31.5
130	"Sospecha de chantaje"	Nicandro Díaz González	March 1, 2013	May 10, 2013	29.2
131	"El segundo beso"	Nicandro Díaz González	March 4, 2013	May 13, 2013	28.3
132	"Beatriz embarazada"	Nicandro Díaz González	March 5, 2013	May 14, 2013	30.3
133	"Viaje por amor"	Nicandro Díaz González	March 6, 2013	May 15, 2013	30.5
134	"Arriaga y Nelson pelean"	Nicandro Díaz González	March 7, 2013	May 16, 2013	30.4
135	"Cambios y reencuentros"	Nicandro Díaz González	March 8, 2013	May 17, 2013	29.2
136	"Escena de celos"	Nicandro Díaz González	March 11, 2013	May 20, 2013	29.3
137	"En búsqueda del amor"	Nicandro Díaz González	March 12, 2013	May 21, 2013	31.4
138	"Mentiras de padre"	Nicandro Díaz González	March 13, 2013	May 22, 2013	30.4
139	"Otra oportunidad en el amor"	Nicandro Díaz González	March 14, 2013	May 23, 2013	29.9
140	"Beso sorpresa"	Nicandro Díaz González	March 15, 2013	May 24, 2013	29.0
141	"Nikki regresa"	Nicandro Díaz González	March 18, 2013	May 27, 2013	28.3
142	"Fechorías de Leonardo"	Nicandro Díaz González	March 19, 2013	May 28, 2013	32.5
143	"Identidad descubierta"	Nicandro Díaz González	March 20, 2013	May 29, 2013	31.4
144	"Guillo aparece"	Nicandro Díaz González	March 21, 2013	May 30, 2013	29.6
145	"Llamada de amor"	Nicandro Díaz González	March 22, 2013	May 31, 2013	28.3
146	"Nueva etapa"	Nicandro Díaz González	March 25, 2013	June 3, 2013	26.2
147	"Enamoramiento revelado"	Nicandro Díaz González	March 26, 2013	June 4, 2013	24.6
148	"Parto complicado"	Nicandro Díaz González	March 27, 2013	June 5, 2013	25.5
149	"Bebé enfermo"	Nicandro Díaz González	March 28, 2013	June 6, 2013	23.4
150	"Propuesta de Matrimonio"	Nicandro Díaz González	March 29, 2013	June 7, 2013	21.7
151	"Asesinato fingido"	Nicandro Díaz González	April 1, 2013	June 10, 2013	27.0
152	"Operación de Mía"	Nicandro Díaz González	April 2, 2013	June 11, 2013	28.4
153	"De guardaespaldas a prometido"	Nicandro Díaz González	April 3, 2013	June 12, 2013	28.2
154	"Cena de presentación"	Nicandro Díaz González	April 4, 2013	June 13, 2013	28.8
155	"Aníbal decidido"	Nicandro Díaz González	April 5, 2013	June 14, 2013	28.4
156	"Venganza de Liliana"	Nicandro Díaz González	April 8, 2013	June 17, 2013	27.9
157	"Cuestionamiento del pasado"	Nicandro Díaz González	April 9, 2013	June 18, 2013	28.0
158	"La amante del pasado"	Nicandro Díaz González	April 10, 2013	June 19, 2013	27.6
159	"Hermana al descubierto"	Nicandro Díaz González	April 11, 2013	June 20, 2013	27.3
160	"Liliana decepcionada"	Nicandro Díaz González	April 12, 2013	June 21, 2013	27.8
161	"Revelación impactante"	Nicandro Díaz González	April 15, 2013	June 24, 2013	28.2
162	"Amor y dudas"	Nicandro Díaz González	April 16, 2013	June 25, 2013	28.4
163	"Celos de amante"	Nicandro Díaz González	April 17, 2013	June 26, 2013	26.9
164	"De Cenicienta a Balvanera"	Nicandro Díaz González	April 18, 2013	June 27, 2013	28.0
165	"El soborno de Aníbal"	Nicandro Díaz González	April 19, 2013	July 1, 2013	26.9
166	"Amor comprado"	Nicandro Díaz González	April 22, 2013	July 2, 2013	28.6
167	"Nelson herido"	Nicandro Díaz González	April 23, 2013	July 3, 2013	29.2
168	"Telegrama"	Nicandro Díaz González	April 24, 2013	July 4, 2013	29.0
169	"Resultados de ADN"	Nicandro Díaz González	April 25, 2013	July 8, 2013	28.9
170	"Adriana embarazada"	Nicandro Díaz González	April 26, 2013	July 9, 2013	26.0
171	"De Balvanera a González"	Nicandro Díaz González	April 29, 2013	July 10, 2013	26.9
172	"Fiesta de Paula"	Nicandro Díaz González	April 30, 2013	July 11, 2013	25.5
173	"Al borde de la muerte"	Nicandro Díaz González	May 1, 2013	July 15, 2013	27.6
174	"Reencuentro de amor"	Nicandro Díaz González	May 2, 2013	July 16, 2013	29.9
175	"Verdadera hija"	Nicandro Díaz González	May 3, 2013	July 17, 2013	27.9
176	"Sueño por cumplir"	Nicandro Díaz González	May 6, 2013	July 18, 2013	29.5
177	"Dos padres"	Nicandro Díaz González	May 7, 2013	July 22, 2013	29.8
178	"Boda gay"	Nicandro Díaz González	May 8, 2013	July 23, 2013	29.8
179	"Dolor de padre"	Nicandro Díaz González	May 9, 2013	July 24, 2013	28.9
180	"La advertencia de Salsero"	Nicandro Díaz González	May 10, 2013	July 25, 2013	25.6
181	"Gran final"	Nicandro Díaz González	May 12, 2013	July 26, 2013	27.9
182	"Gran final"	Nicandro Díaz González	May 12, 2013	July 28, 2013	27.9
183	"Gran final"	Nicandro Díaz González	May 12, 2013	July 28, 2013	27.9

== Special (2013) ==
Title	Original release date	US air date	Viewers (millions)
"Rumbo gran final"	May 12, 2013	July 28, 2013	18.6
