= Susana González =

Mexican actress

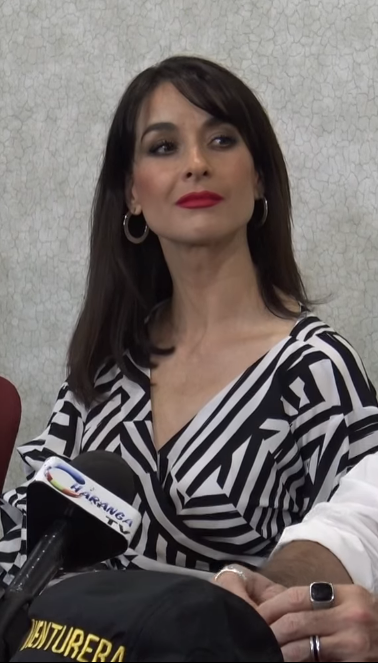
- Born: Susana Alejandra González del Río; 2 October 1973 (age 53); Calera de Víctor Rosales, Zacatecas, Mexico
- Occupations: Actress; dancer; model; singer
- Years active: 1996–present
- Spouse: Marcos Montero (m. 2011)
- Children: 2

Susana Alejandra González del Río (Spanish pronunciation: [suˈsana ɣonˈsales]; born on 2 October 1973, in Calera de Víctor Rosales, Zacatecas, Mexico) is a Mexican actress and model.

== Biography ==
She is the daughter of Refugio González and Elvira del Río, and has a brother, Jose, and a sister, Erika. González wanted to be an actress from a very young age. She was offered a chance to study acting in Mexico City after winning a beauty contest in her hometown.

When González was 18 years old, she won a scholarship to Televisa's acting academy, the Centro de Educación Artística. She was so determined to be an actress that she decided to move from Calera to Mexico City. She was encouraged by the enormous support she received from her family.

Her roles have ranged from a ruthless woman in Amigas y rivales to a sweet and naive girl in Entre el amor y el odio. In 2004 she starred in Al otro lado, a movie co-produced by Spain, Morocco and Mexico. This was an excellent chance for her to be known worldwide. In 2005 she was offered work in Miami, Florida, nearly for a year and a half to shoot the telenovela El amor no tiene precio. This was a difficult time for her due to the time she had to spend far from home.

In 2006 she took part in Bailando por la Boda de Mis Sueños, a reality dancing show. She did not win the first place but won the hearts of the people and judges because of her charisma, sweetness, tenacity, and will to succeed. In 2007 she played the main role of Camila Darien in the telenovela Pasión, produced by Carla Estrada.

In S.O.S.: Sexo y otros Secretos, she played the role of Tania. This TV show offered a perspective of a group of women with five different lives to offer insight into the private side of womanhood.

In 2011, she joined Jose Ron, Jorge Salinas and Ana Brenda Contreras in La que no podía amar. She played Cynthia Montero, a beautiful and boastful young lady who finds out she is a daughter of a maid (portrayed by Ana Martín), which makes her a bastard, and her resentment towards her mother grows.

On 24 June 2013, it was confirmed that González (along with Guy Ecker) would star as the protagonist in Por siempre mi amor.

== Personal life ==
González has two children with Luis Elias, a son Santiago and a daughter Susana.

== Filmography ==
=== Film ===
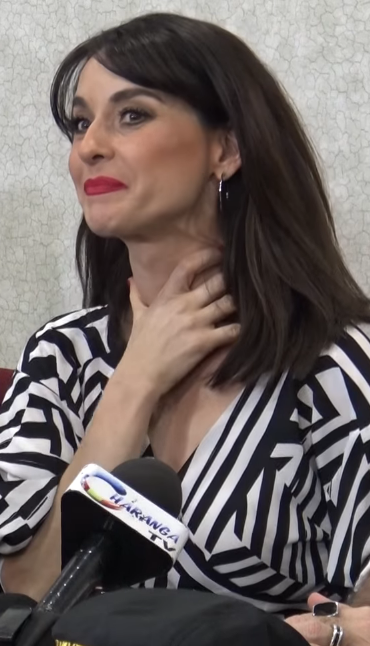
González in an interview with Dulce Osuna on 2 June 2017

Title	Year	Role	Notes
Atómica	1998	Chica Podium	Film debut
¡Que vivan los muertos!	1998	Unknown role	
Silencio profundo	2003	Unknown role	Short film
Al otro lado	2004	Caridad / Angel's Mother	
Cicatrices	2005	Diana	
Chinango	2009	Sofía	

=== Television roles ===
Title	Year	Role	Notes
Baila conmigo	1992	Unknown role	
Sentimientos ajenos	1996	Norma	
María Isabel	1997	Elisa	
¿Qué nos pasa?	1998	Unknown role	
Preciosa	1998	Felina	
Gotita de amor	1998	Naida	
Cuento de Navidad	1999	Mini	
Amor gitano	1999	Zokka	
Mujeres engañadas	1999–2000	Ivette	
Rayito de luz	2000	Unknown role	
Amigas y rivales	2001	Ángela	Recurring role
Entre el amor y el odio	2002	Ana Cristina Robles	Lead role
Velo de novia	2003	Andrea Paz	Lead role
Hospital el paisa	2004	Lucía Gordillo	Episode: "La ex-cita"
El amor no tiene precio	2005	Maria Liz González	Lead role
Heridas de amor	2006	Liliana López-Reyna	Recurring role
Pasión	2007	Camila Darién	Lead role
S.O.S.: Sexo y otros secretos	2007–2008	Tania	26 episodes
Mujeres asesinas	2009	Tere	Episode: "Tere, desconfiada"
Los simuladores	2009	Beatriz Herrera	Episode: "El clon"
Los exitosos Pérez	2009–2010	Alexandra "Alex" Rinaldi	
Para volver a amar	2010–2011	Doménica Mondragón	Recurring role
La que no podía amar	2011–2012	Cynthia Montero Báez	Main cast
Amores verdaderos	2012–2013	Beatriz Guzmán Trejo	Recurring role
Por siempre mi amor	2013–2014	Isabel López Cerdán de De la Riva	Lead role
La sombra del pasado	2014–2015	Roberta Lozada Torres de Alcocer	Guest role
Pasión y poder	2015–2016	Julia Vallado de Gómez Luna	Lead role
La candidata	2016–2017	Cecilia Aguilar / Cecilia Bárcenas Aguilar	Main cast
El vuelo de la victoria	2017	Isadora Duncan	Recurring role
Mi marido tiene familia	2018–2019	Susana Córcega Díaz	Main cast
Imperio de mentiras	2020–2021	Renata Cantú Robles	Main cast
Mi fortuna es amarte	2021–2022	Natalia Robles García	Lead role
Mi camino es amarte	2022–2023	Daniela Gallardo	Lead role
Tu vida es mi vida	2024	Paula Lugo	Lead role
Mi verdad oculta	2025	Aitana Fernández / Adriana Rodríguez	Lead role
Todavía te amo	2027	Hilda	Main cast

== Awards and nominations ==
=== Premios ACE (Argentina) ===
Year	Category	Telenovela	Result
2004	Best Actress of Television Scenic	Velo de novia	Won

=== Premios TVyNovelas ===
Year	Category	Telenovela	Result
2002	Best Female Revelation	Entre el amor y el odio	Won
2004	Best Lead Actress	Velo de novia	Nominated
2008	Best Lead Actress	Pasión	Nominated
2014	Best Co-lead Actress	Amores Verdaderos	Won
2016	Best Co-lead Actress	La sombra del pasado	Won
2017	Best Co-lead Actress	La candidata	Won

=== Premios People en Español ===
Year	Category	Telenovela	Result
2012	Mejor actriz secundaria	La que no podía amar	Won
