= Para toda la vida (TV series) =

1996 Mexican telenovela

- Genre: Telenovela; Romance; Drama
- Created by: Arturo Moya Grau
- Written by: Jesús Calzada; Vivian Pestalozzi; Ricardo Tejeda
- Directed by: Juan Carlos Muñoz; Karina Duprez; Gastón Tuset; Jaime Vega
- Starring: Ofelia Medina; Exequiel Lavanderos; Silvia Pasquel; Anna Silvetti; Margarita Gralia; Ramón Menéndez; Roberto Blandón
- Theme music composer: Luis Guzmán Zaldívar
- Opening theme: Para toda la vida
- Country of origin: Mexico
- Original language: Spanish
- No. of episodes: 80

Production
- Executive producer: Lucero Suárez
- Producers: Nicandro Díaz González; Luis Carpizo; Pablo Noceda Pérez
- Production locations: Filming; Televisa San Ángel; Mexico City, Mexico
- Cinematography: Jesús Nájera Saro; Ernesto Arreola; Alberto Rodríguez
- Running time: 21-22 minutes
- Production companies: Televisa; Megavisión

Original release
- Network: Canal de las Estrellas
- Release: April 15 – August 2, 1996

Related
- La Madrastra (1981); Vivir un poco (1985-1986); Forever (1996); La Madrastra (2005) ¿Quién mató a Patricia Soler? (2014)

Para toda la vida (English: For all life) is a Mexican telenovela produced for Televisa and Megavisión in 1996.

On Monday, April 15, 1996, Canal de las Estrellas started broadcasting Para toda la vida weekdays at 9:30pm, replacing Acapulco, cuerpo y alma. The last episode was broadcast on Friday, August 2, 1996 with Bendita mentira replacing it.

Ofelia Medina and Exequiel Lavanderos starred as protagonists, while Silvia Pasquel starred as main antagonist.

== Cast ==
- Ofelia Medina as Elena
- Exequiel Lavanderos as Fernando Valdemoros Olvido
- Silvia Pasquel as Lydia Valdemoros Rivas
- Anna Silvetti as Flora Valdemoros Rivas
- Margarita Gralia as Adela Montero
- Ramón Menéndez as Fortunato
- Roberto Blandón as Oscar
- Oscar Traven as Lorenzo Montalbán
- Olivia Collins as Lucía
- Roberto "Flaco" Guzmán as Cipriano
- Oscar Morelli as Father Cristóbal
- Diana Golden as Silvia
- Roberto Palazuelos as Rolando
- Héctor Soberón as Alfredo
- Isabel Martínez "La Tarabilla" as Eulalia
- Beatriz Moreno as Matilde
- Roberto "Puck" Miranda as Arquimedes
- Pituka de Foronda as Marquise
- Fernando Luján as Joan Andreu
- Monserrat Gallosa as Violeta
- Arath de la Torre as Amadeo
- Eduardo Arroyuelo as Enrique Valdemoros
- Paola Otero as Estela Valdemoros
- Kuno Becker as Eduardo Valdemoros
- Araceli Vitta as Marisa
- Julio Mannino as Torres
- Rodrigo Bastidas as Ignacio
