= Mi fortuna es amarte =

Mexican telenovela

- Genre: Telenovela
- Based on: La quiero a morir by Luis Felipe Salamanca
- Developed by: Juan Carlos Alcalá
- Written by: Alejandra Díaz; José Rubén Núñez
- Directed by: Alejandro Gamboa; Isaías Gómez
- Starring: Susana González; David Zepeda; Sergio Sendel; Chantal Andere
- Theme music composer: J.Eduardo Murguía; Mauricio L. Arriaga; Ricardo Larrea
- Opening theme: "Mi fortuna es amarte" by Yuri and Sonora Santanera
- Country of origin: Mexico
- Original language: Spanish
- No. of seasons: 1
- No. of episodes: 92

Production
- Executive producer: Nicandro Díaz González
- Producer: J. Antonio Arvizu Velázquez
- Editors: Mauricio Coronel Cortez; Rodrigo Morales
- Production company: TelevisaUnivision

Original release
- Network: Las Estrellas
- Release: 8 November 2021 – 13 March 2022

Mi fortuna es amarte (English title: Your Love Is My Fortune) is a Mexican telenovela that aired on Las Estrellas from 8 November 2021 to 13 March 2022. The series is produced by Nicandro Díaz González. It is an adaptation of the Colombian telenovela La quiero a morir created by Luis Felipe Salamanca. It stars Susana González and David Zepeda. The telenovela follows Natalia and Vicente, who are forced by life circumstances to live together under the same roof.

The telenovela has been streaming on Vix since 21 July 2022 and has a total of 95 episodes.

== Plot ==
Natalia Robles has dedicated her life to her family. On the eve of celebrating her 20th wedding anniversary, she discovers the betrayal of her husband, Adrián Cantú, who is on the run with Verónica Alanís, Natalia's best friend. Adrián and Verónica have hatched a plan to flee after having scammed the clients of the real estate agency where they are both partners, along with Mario, Verónica's boyfriend. Adrián leaves Natalia bankrupt. However, in the midst of her situation, she decides to move forward in order to raise her daughters, Andrea and Regina.

On the other hand, Vicente Ramírez, suffers the loss of his wife Lucía Nieto, who is killed in a robbery. Vicente's young son Benjamín witnessed the death of his mother and suffers trauma that leaves him speechless. The day after burying Lucía, Vicente is confronted with the surprise that he has been a victim of fraud by Adrián's real estate agency. Natalia and Vicente's lives come together when he arrives at the real estate agency to claim the money that was scammed from them, along with the other creditors. Natalia, on behalf of her husband, and Mario, ask for time to be able to repair the economic damage. Natalia and Vicente will discover that even in the midst of the worst experience, love can always be rescued.

== Cast ==
=== Main ===
- Susana González as Natalia Robles García
- David Zepeda as Vicente "Chente" Ramírez Pérez
- Sergio Sendel as Adrián Cantú Garza
- Chantal Andere as Constanza Robles García
- Omar Fierro as Elías Haddad Nassar
- Luis Felipe Tovar as Gustavo "Tavo" Martínez Sánchez
- Carlos de la Mota as Mario Rivas Acosta
- Michelle González as Olga Pascual Chávez
- Ana Bertha Espin as Teresa García Jiménez
- Lisset as Samia Karam Mansour
- Luz Elena González as Soledad "Chole" Pascual Gama
- Michelle Vieth as Fernanda Diez Acuña
- Dayren Chávez as Valentina Cruz López
- Ricardo Silva as Claudio Sevilla León
- Eduardo Liñán as Carlos Zuno
- Ximena Cordoba as Tania Rivas Acosta
- Denia Agalianou as Verónica Alanís Gómez
- Marcos Montero as William
- Ricardo Franco as Félix
- Said P as Sinba
- Carlos Mosmo as Donovan
- Fernanda Urdapilleta as Andrea Cantú Robles
- Rodrigo Brand as Omar Haddad Karam
- Ramsés Alemán as Juan Gabriel "Juanga" Ramírez Pérez
- Daniela Martínez Caballero as Regina Cantú Robles
- Andrés Vázquez as José José "Pepe Pepe" Ramírez Pérez
- André Sebastián González as Benjamín Ramírez Nieto
- Carmen Salinas as Margarita "Magos" Domínguez Negrete (episodes 15–45)
- María Rojo as Margarita "Magos" Domínguez Negrete (episodes 46–92)

=== Recurring and guest stars ===
- Adriana Fonseca as Lucía Nieto Paz
- Archie Lafranco as Pedro
- María Prado as Juanita
- Roberto Tello as Benito
- José Luis Duval as Mr. Ortiz
- Lorena San Martín as Patricia de la Garza
- Hans Gaitán as Mauricio
- Valeria Santaella as Kimberly
- Yekaterina Kiev as Helena
- Mónica Pont as Dr. María Campuzano
- Diana Golden as Macorina
- Alfredo Alfonso as Fabián
- Luis Arturo as Lorenzo
- Marco Muñoz as Julián Reus
- Marco Uriel as Chef Téllez
- René Casados as Heliodoro Flores
- Bea Ranero as Sandra Arellano
- Juan Vidal as Marco Saldívar
- Carlos Miguel as Luis Galindo

== Production ==
On 23 June 2021, the telenovela was announced by executive producer Nicandro Díaz González, with the working title El amor cambia de piel. On 6 July 2021 Susana González and David Zepeda were cast in the lead roles. Filming of the telenovela began on 26 August 2021, under the title Mi fortuna es amarte. Filming concluded in February 2022.

== Episodes ==
No.	Title	Original release date	Mexico viewers (millions)
1	"Un matrimonio de mentiras"	8 November 2021 (Note: Premiered early online through Las Estrellas website on 5 November 2021.)	3.7
Natalia celebrates her wedding anniversary with Adrián, but he leaves her to go with his lover Verónica. Lucia tries to rescue her son and is shot at the bank after being robbed. Lucia says goodbye to Chente in the hospital with a kiss.
2	"Ni una lágrima más"	9 November 2021	3.9
Everyone in the neighborhood says goodbye to Lucía. Adrián's frauds at the finance company lead Natalia to meet Chente and he asks to talk to her to solve the situation of his house, since he is willing to defend his house no matter what. Natalia decides not to let Adrián's betrayal make her life fall apart. Chente does not know how to overcome Lucía's death and move forward with his son.
3	"Un lugar donde vivir"	10 November 2021	3.9
Olga insists on being with Chente now that he is a widower, but Benjamín begins to treat her badly, as he can't stand her.Natalia suffers from being evicted. Valentina arrives to ask for a job at the mechanic's shop and leaves everyone surprised when she perfectly fixes a car. Adrián begins to have problems with Verónica. Constanza does not allow Natalia and her daughters to stay at her house.
4	"Somos uno"	11 November 2021	3.3
Chente takes Benjamín to a doctor to find out why he has stopped talking since Lucía's death. Natalia manages to save her belongings. Constanza receives her mother at her house. Omar, very angry about what his father did to Andrea's family, decides to leave the house. Chente learns that Benjamín needs therapy. Natalia loses all her money after being mugged. Benjamín lets Chente know that he doesn't want Olga to help him in the house anymore. Andrea and Omar make love.
5	"Algo justo"	12 November 2021	3.3
Chente does not allow Olga to enter his house. Natalia slaps Andrea for offending her by telling her that she will become Mario's lover. Natalia and her daughters move into Mario's house. Verónica is suspicious of Adrián's love. Chente takes Benjamín to therapy to help him overcome his grief. Seeing that the purchase of Chente's house is not valid, he and Natalia come to an agreement and find a clue to tell them where the money is.
6	"No eres la única víctima"	15 November 2021	3.6
Chente makes it clear to Olga that no one is going to take Lucía’s place and is furious when he discovers that she removed the photos of his wife. Olga again threatens to take her own life. Omar will no longer be able to accept Andrea and her family in his apartment. Verónica tells Adrian that Mario is now after Natalia. Mario begins to feel attracted to Natalia and kisses her. Verónica sends an unpleasant message to Natalia.
7	"Lo único que me queda en la vida"	16 November 2021	3.9
Natalia is furious when she receives some roses from Verónica and decides to leave Mario's house. Gustavo fires Valentina on Constanza's orders. Natalia makes it clear to Chente that she will no longer be able to sell him the house, he gets upset and they begin to argue, since she intends to live in Chente's house with her daughters. Chole confesses her feelings to Gustavo. Chente and his brothers let Natalia know that they do not want to lose their house, but Benjamín wants Natalia to stay.
8	"Bajo el mismo techo"	17 November 2021	3.7
Natalia asks Chente to let her share the same roof while her financial situation is sorted out. Chole and Gustavo have a romantic dinner. Chente decides to help Natalia and lets her move in with her daughters, which will put everyone living under the same roof, while Mario is arrested for Adrián's frauds. Natalia talks to Benjamín so he can get over his mother's death. Constanza ruins Gustavo's plans with Chole.
9	"Primera noche"	18 November 2021	3.9
Constanza begins to seduce Gustavo for a night of passion. Olga learns of Natalia's arrival at Chente's house and Chente makes it clear that she will live at his house. Natalia is offended by Olga's words. Constanza meets Chente at the shop and assures him that Natalia refused her help. Tania asks Natalia to help Mario get out of jail. Chente is disappointed in Natalia.
10	"Capaz de todo"	19 November 2021	3.6
Chente takes Regina and Andrea out of his house, while Natalia is absent, Gustavo finds out and decides to take them home even though he knows they will not be well received by Constanza. Teresa and Gustavo ask Constanza to let her nieces stay at her house, but when they see her refusal, they all decide to leave and leave her alone. Gustavo tells Chole that he dared to leave his wife, so he is determined to try a relationship with her. The police arrives when Natalia assaults Chente, so they decide to take them away for disturbing the peace.
11	"Como dos buenos amigos"	22 November 2021	3.7
Verónica asks Adrián to get down on one knee to ask him to marry her, to which he agrees, but also tells her that now he will have to divorce Natalia. While spending the night in prison, Natalia takes the opportunity to make Chente see that the only ones they are hurting are their children and that they should be united for their sake. While Tavo takes a bath, Constanza mistakes him for William but manages to hide it, although he later finds a couple of glasses in the bedroom that make him doubt. After leaving the prison, Natalia and Chente return home but he explodes when he realizes that her parents will also be staying.
12	"Sacrificios de familia"	23 November 2021	4.3
After she promised Tavo to help Natalia, Constanza visits her in her new house where she tries to humiliate her but Natalia makes her leave and is supported by Tere. Tavo is afraid that Chole will realize that he cannot have children so he decides to return to Constanza, despite the mistreatment and humiliation. Andrea tells Omar everything they have had to go through at Chente's house but also tells him that Juanga has been bothering her. Claudio visits Constanza to borrow money but William arrives inopportunely and makes his intentions clear.
13	"¡Fiesta de bienvenida!"	24 November 2021	3.8
Juanga and Pepe Pepe decide to throw a welcome party for Natalia and her daughters, but Chente doesn't agree with the idea. Andrea and Omar arrive in the middle of the party, Juanga decides to ask her to dance, which almost causes a fight between him and Omar. Natalia decides to stay with Chente after she sees him grieving over the death of his wife, but Olga, who is in a drunken rage, finds them together and causes a scene.
14	"Conmigo se sacó la lotería"	25 November 2021	4.0
Tavo finds it very strange that Constanza is not home so he decides to call her friends but none of them know about her, so when he arrives he surprises her by questioning her about her whereabouts. Natalia tells Chente that it makes her laugh that Olga is jealous of her, to which he answers if she would fall in love with a man like him. Olga asks Chente not to cut her out of his life, so he lets her know that his wife is still stuck in his heart. Natalia tries to make Andrea see her reality, but Andrea decides to move in with Omar even though he doesn't agree, but ends up accepting her.
15	"Juntos saldremos adelante"	26 November 2021	3.5
Tania sees Natalia in the street and starts insulting her until she slaps her hard. Olga looks at the situation from afar and plans to take advantage of it. Mario calls Tania to tell her that her lawyer told him that she hasn't settled a single debt, to which she replies that she was busy selling his car. Natalia and Samia go to Omar's apartment to tell them that they can't get married, but he and Andrea insist on staying together no matter what. Olga tells Natalia to behave like the lady that she is and to stop being so angry with Chente, to which she replies that she is tired of her insults.
16	"Medidas drásticas"	29 November 2021	3.9
Chente finds out that Claudio did not let his grandmother into his house and ends up hitting him. Natalia asks Claudio to apologize to Doña Magos. Verónica goes to Italy with her new victim and calls Olga to make an alliance. Andrea is humiliated by her in-laws. Magos suffers when she learns of Lucía's death. Magos meets Natalia. Verónica makes a proposal to Elías. Chente gets so angry that he divides the house.
17	"Tentativa de homicidio"	30 November 2021	3.9
Olga threatens Benjamín and he tries to tell everything to his grandmother Magos. The wall in the house continues and nobody understands Chente's attitude. Magos is surprised to see that Benjamín likes Natalia. Chente takes Benjamín to therapy. Elías wants to catch Adrián. Chente ends up in jail for hitting Claudio and blames Natalia for what happened. William blackmails Constanza. Omar proposes to Andrea.
18	"Cada día que pasa me enamoro más"	1 December 2021	3.9
Natalia gets Claudio to drop the lawsuit against Chente and he is released, but he is still angry. Olga continues to stir up trouble between Natalia and Chente. Olga intimidates Benjamín with a toy gun. Chente refuses Natalia's dinner, but despite his indifference, he imagines kissing her. Elías proposes a deal to Verónica.
19	"Sacar fuerzas del amor"	2 December 2021	3.8
Tania confesses to Adrián why she has a grudge against her brother. Doña Magos remembers when she revealed to Lucía the great secret that afflicts her and the promise she asked her about her grandchildren. Elias and Samia rage against Omar and humiliate Andrea by kicking her out of their son's apartment. Andrea returns to Chente's house. Fernanda confesses to Natalia that she saw Gustavo kissing another woman. William threatens Constanza.
20	"Voy a luchar por nuestro amor"	3 December 2021	4.1
Natalia comforts Andrea and makes it clear that she will always help her. Adrián looks for Andrea because he says he misses her, but she rejects him and tells him that he abandoned them. Omar offers an apology to Andrea and makes it clear that he will defend their love, they reconcile and continue with their wedding plans. Chente asks Natalia to accompany him to Benjamín's therapy. Olga confronts Andrea and Regina. Omar gives up everything in order to be happy with Andrea. Constanza pays William. Adrián discovers that Verónica stole all his money.
21	"Te puede salir el tiro por la culata"	6 December 2021	4.0
Constanza confesses her infidelity to Fernanda. Natalia visits Mario and encourages him. Elías confronts Adrián after having stolen from him and turns him in to the authorities. Olga is determined to go on a trip with Chente. Elías looks for Natalia to make her a proposal, but he tries to hurt her and Chente arrives to defend her, but Elías threatens him with a gun.
22	"Al mal tiempo, buena cara"	7 December 2021	3.9
Chente arrives to defend Natalia from Elías, but Elías threatens Chente with a gun. Andrea decides to postpone her wedding. Claudio continues his investigation of Constanza's infidelity. Chente invites Natalia to go out for the weekend with his entire family. Magos opens her heart to Natalia by confessing her illness. Samia does everything to make Natalia lose her job. Constanza makes up with Natalia. Andrea agrees to marry Omar. Chole suffers when she learns that Tavo is going on a trip with his wife. Juan Gabriel confronts Gustavo for Chole's love.
23	"La vida es para gozarla"	8 December 2021	4.2
Chole complains to Gustavo for hiding from her about his trip with his wife. Mario receives a visit from Valentina in jail. Samia looks for Natalia to complain to her for wanting to mess with her husband and Natalia slaps her. Constanza gives Gustavo a warning. Andrea takes a pregnancy test. The Ramírez Pérez family goes on a trip to the beach. Natalia receives a call from Adrián. William wants more money and threatens Constanza.
24	"Las manos quietas si me haces el favor"	9 December 2021	4.2
Natalia suffers when she receives a call from Adrián. Mario informs Natalia that Adrián has been arrested. Olga pretends to faint so she can kiss Chente. Chente returns to the city with Benjamín for work. Constanza discovers that Andrea is pregnant and manages to convince her not to say anything to Omar. Olga wants to seduce Chente and gets into his bed. Constanza reveals Andrea's secret. Elías is willing to do anything to save Omar. Adrián needs Natalia.
25	"Ojalá ese arroz se cueza muy pronto"	10 December 2021	4.0
Natalia tells Chente about Adrián's call and he promises to protect her. Magos makes it clear to Olga that she does not want her for Chente, because Natalia is the woman he deserves. Constanza asks Regina not to say anything about Andrea’s pregnancy. Chente invites Natalia to lunch and confesses that he likes her. Juan Gabriel sees Chole kissing Gustavo and is heartbroken. Regina defends Pepe Pepe from Constanza.
26	"Tomarse atribuciones"	13 December 2021	3.9
Natalia shows Samia that she is not ashamed to go out with Chente. Magos and Chelo are surprised to learn that Juanga and Olga are already dating. Mario is released from jail and arrives with Natalia to ask for asylum, a situation that Chente dislikes. Omar's bachelor party is organized so that he falls into Elias' trap. Andrea is disappointed in Omar. Mario swears to Chente that he will fight for Natalia's love.
27	"Mantener la cabeza fría"	14 December 2021	4.0
Mario is willing to fight for Natalia's love. Andrea receives a message from Omar telling her that they are breaking up. Elías wants to get Omar out of the country. Mario goes to Chole's boarding house to rent a room and meets Valentina. Andrea begins to feel severe pain after learning that Omar broke up with her and Constanza decides to take her to the hospital. Olga threatens Benjamín again. Constanza prevents Natalia from seeing Andrea. Omar goes looking for Andrea but Constanza will not let him see her.
28	"Voy a ser abuela"	15 December 2021	3.9
Omar arrives to look for Andrea to explain everything but Constanza prevents him from seeing her and he is arrested. Valentina and Mario begin to get along better. Elías manages to get Omar to return to England. Natalia looks for Andrea to offer her all her support, since her life is going to change from now on. Gustavo wants to divorce Constanza, but Constanza makes it clear that she will not give him a divorce. Elías and Samia want to get rid of Andrea's baby. Natalia will leave Chente's house and he gets upset.
29	"Mi abuelita tiene cáncer"	16 December 2021	3.9
Gustavo fires Simba for his bad behavior and for threatening him. Natalia arrives at the house and is shocked to see Magos passed out on the stairs. Constanza makes a proposal to Simba. Magos reveals to Natalia her condition and Natalia begs her to get a second opinion. Regina tries to convince Andrea to return home. Natalia reveals her grandmother's illness to Chente. Chole opens her heart to Teresa. Andrea suffers when she learns that Omar left the country. Benjamín proposes that they help sell Natalia's desserts.
30	"Ya se me metió en mi corazón"	17 December 2021	3.5
William learns from Sinba that Constanza wanted to kill him and runs to take revenge, although this leads to a tragic fate. Chente gets jealous when he sees Mario with Natalia. Gustavo receives the intimate video of Constanza and William. Chente makes it clear to Mario that he loves Natalia. Elías visits Adrián in jail. Olga advises Mario not to lose Natalia. Andrea suffers when she learns that Omar left the country. Adrián is attacked in jail. Olga tries to get Juanga to cheat on her to end the relationship. Gustavo confronts Constanza about her infidelity.
31	"Estoy libre de ti"	20 December 2021	4.0
Natalia decides to leave when Chente tells her that it would be better if she left. Gustavo makes it clear to Constanza that he wants to separate from her to rebuild his life with Chole. Juanga wants to marry Olga. Natalia offers her support to Constanza. Andrea and Regina look for Samia to tell her where Omar is. The therapist assures Benjamín that Natalia leaving home will affect him. Natalia visits Adrián in jail to confront him about his cheating. Andrea goes into crisis and tries to take her own life.
32	"Luchar por el amor"	21 December 2021	3.9
Natalia is sad to be left without her daughters. Juanga asks Olga out. Omar tries to communicate with Andrea but Elías lies to him again. Chole and Gustavo make love. Sinba shows Constanza photos of Chole and Gustavo and decides to enter the boarding house to confront her husband. Juanga proposes to Olga and she accepts. Gustavo declares war on Constanza. Magos asks Chente to take a chance with Natalia.
33	"Dame una señal"	22 December 2021	3.4
Natalia listens to Fernanda and agrees to go out of town for a few days. Constanza tells her nieces about her separation. Mario complains to Gustavo for not visiting him in jail. Sinba humiliates Gustavo in front of everyone. Natalia says goodbye to her daughters before leaving for Valle de Bravo. Olga continues to torment Benjamín. Sinba decides to take revenge by firing Juanga. Chente asks Lucía for a sign that he must fight for Natalia. Juanga hits Sinba after firing him. Pepe Pepe, Regina and Benjamín go to the fair, but Benjamín runs away.
34	"Podemos pasar la noche juntos"	23 December 2021	N/A
Natalia is happy to see Chente after her car breaks down. Benjamín arrives home scared and Magos comforts him. Pepe Pepe and Regina are happy to see that Benjamín is safe. Magos asks Chente to stay with Natalia. Teresa gives advice to Andrea about her pregnancy. Chente and Natalia decide to spend the night at the cabin. Constanza does not want Gustavo to receive any of her money, so she asks Mario for help.
35	"Las miradas dicen más que las palabras"	24 December 2021	2.0
Regina organizes a meeting at her aunt's house. Olga tells Andrea how she can terminate her pregnancy. Constanza tries to convince Mario to help her not to lose her property. Although Natalia accepts that she is not ready to love again, Chente asks her to let go and they kiss, after singing a song to her. Natalia offers an apology to Chente for what happened during the night. Verónica gets information out of Olga and uses it to annoy Natalia. Adrián gets upset when Elías insults his daughter Andrea.
36	"No te necesito"	27 December 2021	3.4
Adrián calls Verónica to tell her that he will never get his love or money back because he should not have left Natalia for a woman as worthless as her. Natalia desperately runs to Constanza's house to look for Andrea, but at that moment Andra arrives very upset and tells them that her father convinced her to leave the clinic where she would terminate her pregnancy. Teresa suggests to Magos that she should tell her grandchildren about her ovarian tumor, but she replies that she is embarrassed to tell them. Constanza tells Andrea that she always wanted a child and asks her to give her baby in exchange for important economic benefits.
37	"¿Estás enamorada de Vicente?"	28 December 2021	3.8
Olga wants Natalia to believe that she meant well when she warned Andrea about the dangers of going to the clinic. Mario confirms to Natalia that Olga told him where Andrea was. Chente talks to Benjamín about his feelings for Natalia, so he is happy to hear that his dad loves her. Natalia confesses to Fernanda everything she felt when she kissed Chente but considers that her life is not stable enough to think about love. Constanza finds out that Gustavo started the divorce process without telling her, so she gets furious and does not give him control of his shop.
38	"En las buenas y en las malas"	29 December 2021	3.8
Regina says that she finds Constanza's attitude very strange, but Natalia tells her that she always wanted to have a child and believes that she wants to live the experience through Andrea. Adrián takes advantage of Andrea's visit to tell her to talk to Natalia so that she gives him a chance, but she tells him that Regina doesn't want to hear from him either. Samia lets Constanza know that if Andrea's baby is a boy they are willing to recognize him as a Haddad but that is not in her plans and she is furious. Magos asks Natalia to tell her how she feels about her grandson, so she has no choice but to accept that she loves Chente even though she thinks they are not ready for a relationship.
39	"Te quiero para mí"	30 December 2021	N/A
Magos asks Juanga not to rush his wedding to Olga, while she tells Pepe Pepe that she wants him to be the first in the family with a college degree. Mario is upset that Natalia and Chente spent the night together, so he lets her know that people are talking bad about her but she replies that she doesn't care and if he can't see her only as a friend it's better to stay away. Regina tells Juanga that she doesn't know what she sees in Olga, but he tells her that at least she is more decent than her mother. Regina slaps Juanga.
40	"Pensé que era un hombre decente"	31 December 2021	N/A
Natalia tells Adrián that he married her for her money but he replies that he wants her to give him a chance to make up for the damage he did to them. Tania apologizes to Verónica for the disaster she caused with her accounts, however Verónica is still furious and gives her a glass of wine with poison to end her life. Chente confronts Olga for defaming Natalia and when he tells her that not all women are like her, she slaps him.
41	"Goles olímpicos"	3 January 2022	4.1
Natalia proposes to Chente to open a restaurant in the house, he accepts on one condition. Constanza wants to get rid of Chole from the boarding house and her beauty salon. Olga, desperate to win Chente's love, decides to implore the spirits to get the man she loves. Juanga serenades Olga. Olga is grateful for Juanga's serenade and Juanga reconciles with Chente. Regina looks for Adrián in jail and asks him to give her mother a divorce. Gustavo makes a proposal to Constanza.
42	"Voy a recuperar mi vida"	4 January 2022	4.2
Natalia tells Chente what the doctor told her about his grandmother. Despite having hope, Magos rules out surgery. Adrián is released from jail and is determined to rectify the damage to his family. Natalia tries to convince Magos to have the surgery. Chente buys everything for the restaurant and brings Natalia flowers. Adrián decides to look for Natalia but Mario arrives to stop him and they end up hitting each other. Valentina confesses her love for Mario.
43	"Soy una mujer libre"	5 January 2022	4.2
Natalia makes it clear to Adrián that she doesn't want him in her life and they all. Natalia confesses her love for Chente to Fernanda. Adrián learns that Mario and Chente are partners in Natalia's restaurant. Felix questions Olga about Valentina's whereabouts. Magos wants to divide her assets between her grandchildren and Heliodoro Flores, her boyfriend. Olga questions Valentina about Felix. Gustavo recovers his shop.
44	"El amor es a prueba de todo"	6 January 2022	3.6
Natalia makes it clear to Adrián that she doesn't want him in her life. Chente confesses his love to Natalia and Natalia ends up telling him that she is also falling in love with him and they decide to give each other a chance to be happy. Pepe confesses to Regina that he is in love with her. Andrea does not want her mother to be with Chente. Natalia announces that she will give herself a chance with Chente.
45	"Jugar con fuego"	7 January 2022	3.8
Natalia and Chente talk to Benjamín about their relationship and why they have decided to live together. Olga asks for Verónica's help to kill Natalia, because she can't stand her existence anymore. Natalia confronts Andrea to defend her love for Chente. Adrián demands his rights from Elías.
46	"No te metas con mi hombre"	10 January 2022	4.6
Andrea asks her mother to break up with Chente or she will never see her again. Juanga receives support from everyone in the shop after his breakup with Olga. Olga wants Sinba to kill Natalia. Natalia allows Pepe Pepe to be Regina’s boyfriend. Natalia stops Olga from kissing Chente and makes it clear that he is now with her. Chente takes Natalia to a romantic place and they make love.
47	"Quedar como héroe"	11 January 2022	4.5
Olga threatens Benjamín again, telling him that Natalia is also going to die. Adrián looks for Natalia and finds Magos in bad shape, so he decides to take her to the hospital. Natalia arrives at the hospital and thanks Adrián for his help. Mario says goodbye to his sister Tania. Mauricio learns of Andrea's pregnancy. Adrián celebrates being a hero. Magos refuses to go into surgery and begs Natalia to take care of her grandchildren.
48	"Fuera de peligro"	12 January 2022	4.4
Olga contacts Félix and they make a deal. Félix enters the boarding house and threatens Valentina. Everyone joins in prayer for Magos' health. Félix manages to take Valentina away with threats. Samia learns of Natalia's relationship with Chente. Magos' operation is a success and she confesses to Chente that she has a boyfriend. Adrián finds out about Natalia and Chente's relationship. Mario is worried about Valentina's disappearance.
49	"La familia siempre es lo primero"	13 January 2022	4.5
Félix calls Mario and ends up threatening him. Benjamín is happy to know that his grandmother is well. Valentina does not want anything to happen to Mario. Adrián tries to make Natalia understand that her place is at his side. Teresa demands that Adrián leave Natalia alone and slaps him. Félix orders Valentina to work in the strip club. Olga puts Félix on notice. Chente is willing to win Regina and Andrea's affection. Adrián will do anything to separate Chente from Natalia.
50	"Echarle crema a tus tacos"	14 January 2022	3.7
Although Chente tells Adrián that he does not doubt Natalia's love, he almost hits him when he replies that his wife is using him to teach him a lesson. Adrián enters Natalia's house to try to convince her that they should be together, but when he forcibly kisses her, she hits him and warns him that she is not the same docile and submissive woman she was before. Tavo and Sinba try to pose as clients at the strip club to rescue Valentina, but Félix doesn't buy the story and sends them away, but later asks to speak to Mario. The doctor tells Chente and Magos that her tumor is benign and there is no danger of cancer.
51	"En la guerra y en el amor todo se vale"	17 January 2022	4.6
Adrián is ready to meet with Omar to open his eyes about his father. Andrea tries to convince her mom and Regina to accept the money her dad is offering them and justifies Adrián’s actions. Valentina thanks Mario for his help. Chente learns from Andrea that Natalia and Adrián kissed, and complains to Natalia. Olga meets Adrián and they join forces to separate Natalia from Chente.
52	"Donde hubo fuego, cenizas quedan"	18 January 2022	4.2
Olga gives Sinba the money to kill Natalia. Adrián has a plan to get Natalia back and asks Andrea for help. Samia and Constanza make fun of Natalia's relationship with Chente. Verónica is furious when she learns that Natalia kissed Adrián. Magos asks Chente to trust and believe in Natalia's love. Verónica calls Natalia to summon her to give her the evidence against Adrián.
53	"Se me rompió el amor"	19 January 2022	4.3
Adrián seeks forgiveness from his family. Chente discovers that Natalia did leave with Adrián and rejects her. Gustavo makes it clear to Chole that he does not want to have children and because of this, Chole decides to break up with him. Chente rejects Olga's caresses and complains to her for agreeing with Adrián. Natalia does not want to go back to Adrián. Olga asks Sinba for a favor to force Chente to be by her side. Natalia tries to explain things to Chente but he hangs up on her. Chole suffers when she finds out what happened to Olga.
54	"Me quiero morir"	20 January 2022	4.4
Chole suffers at seeing Olga beaten and helpless for not having been able to help her. Juanga learns what Olga intended to do with Kimberly's help. Regina tells Pepe Pepe that her father wants to help him get a scholarship. Gustavo hires Sinba on Valentina's advice. Natalia slaps Chente for offending her and yelling at her. Natalia can't stand that Chente doesn't trust her and decides to end their relationship. Olga makes Chente feel guilty for her 'misfortune' and provokes a fight between Chente and Juanga.
55	"¿Tú qué sabes de amor?"	21 January 2022	4.4
Olga is sure that Chente will be with her out of remorse and although Sinba doubts it, he asks her to pay him for helping her. Chole refuses the deeds to the pension given to her by Gustavo. Chente visits Olga, who tells him that she feels broken but that he transmits her a lot of peace. Constanza learns that Adrián will accompany Andrea to the gynecologist, which unleashes her fury. Natalia and Adrián dial Omar but Verónica answers and starts to make fun of them.
56	"Renuncia al amor de Chente"	24 January 2022	4.5
Verónica reveals to Natalia several truths she didn't know about Adrián. Elías learns that Adrián wants to communicate with Omar. Natalia asks Adrián to leave her house. Magos makes it clear to Pepe Pepe that she feels like Olga is taking advantage of Chente's guilt over what happened to her. Olga asks Natalia to let her have her way with Chente. Natalia and Chente go to Benjamín's outdoor therapy and get Benjamín to play soccer.
57	"Me voy a ir de esta casa"	25 January 2022	4.7
Teresa can't stand Constanza's insults and slaps her. Natalia and Chente decide to talk about what happened with Adrián. Adrián manages to locate Omar and will buy him a flight to Mexico. Natalia forgives Chente and they reconcile, but Natalia does not accept Olga moving in. Juanga suffers when he learns that Olga will move in with Chente. Natalia welcomes Olga and allows her to move into her bedroom. Natalia decides to leave Chente's house. Samia arrives in London to prevent Omar from returning to Mexico. Olga threatens Benjamín again.
58	"¿Quieres ser mi mamá?"	26 January 2022	4.9
Olga looks for Chente in his room to seduce him, but is surprised to find him next to Natalia, who asks her to respect their privacy. Valentina visits Félix in jail. Natalia decides to leave the house, but Benjamín shouts begging her to stay by his side. Omar learns from Adrián that he is going to be a father. Benjamín asks his dad for Olga to leave the house. Omar complains to Samia for hiding the fact that Andrea is pregnant. Chole kicks out Olga from the boarding house for betraying Valentina. Magos does not want Olga in her house.
59	"Terminar con este calvario"	27 January 2022	4.8
Olga asks Benjamín not to say anything or she will cut out his tongue. Magos makes it clear to Olga that she will not allow her to want anything more with Chente. Natalia leaves the house with her family and Benjamín. Chente gives Olga one more day to stay in his house and she tries to take her own life by taking pills. Adrián wants Mario to be his partner again. Natalia misses living in the neighborhood. Mario agrees to work with Adrián on Elías' orders. Chente learns that Olga can't be left alone. Adrián surprises Natalia when he arrives to live in the new mansion. Fernanda and Mario have dinner together.
60	"Vivir como pareja"	28 January 2022	4.3
Natalia is surprised to see Olga kissing Chente. Gustavo does not accept Juanga's mistake and fires him. Fernanda and Mario start flirting. Elías learns that Omar already knows about Andrea's pregnancy. Constanza becomes obsessed with Andrea's baby. Fernanda kisses Mario, both agree not to fall in love and let themselves go. Chente proposes to Natalia to spend every night together. Constanza asks Andrea to go on a trip together. Adrián sets a trap for Elías and takes Omar with Andrea.
61	"Reniego de tu apellido"	31 January 2022	4.1
Omar explains to Andrea why he left the country. Natalia and Chente have the name of the food stand ready. Chente asks Mario not to be a partner anymore. Natalia finds out about Fernanda and Mario. Sinba threatens Olga to tell Chente the whole truth. Omar confronts Elías for making him believe he killed a woman and despises him. Valentina confronts Olga for her betrayal. Gustavo proposes to Chole. Adrián fights with Constanza over Andrea's baby.
62	"Un hijo no se vende"	1 February 2022	4.1
Chole agrees to marry Gustavo. Natalia is confused to see Olga leaving without any fear. Adrián tells Natalia that Andrea and Omar have already reconciled and that he will do everything to get her back. Adrián gives Olga money and she agrees to help him with whatever he wants. Elías threatens Samia with leaving her in ruin if she looks for her son. Mario introduces Fernanda to Valentina, who gets jealous and suffers when she sees them together. Constanza reveals the pact she made with Andrea, Omar and Natalia are disappointed. Olga and Adrián leave together.
63	"Piensen que estoy muerto"	2 February 2022	4.0
Natalia makes it clear to Andrea that she must respect her dignity. Teresa complains to Claudio. Gustavo and Chole continue with their party. Andrea loses control and tries to slap Regina. Mario talks to Valentina and explains that he only sees her as his friend. Chente asks Andrea to respect her mother. Olga seduces Adrián and he falls for her charms. Chente offers Omar to work with him in the repair shop. Omar asks Andrea and his mother not to look for him anymore. Claudio threatens Olga. Adrian sets a trap for Pepe Pepe.
64	"Voy a luchar por mi hijo"	3 February 2022	4.4
Adrián rushes Andrea to the hospital. Natalia and Adrián learn that Andrea arrived with a threatened abortion. Omar arrives to live at the boarding house. Constanza wants Andrea to lose her baby. Magos is determined to get Olga to leave Chente's house soon. Omar learns that Andrea and the baby are out of danger. Olga gives Magos a massage. Andrea apologizes to Natalia and decides to go live at the boarding house with Omar. Claudio tells Chente that Olga went out with Adrián. Benjamín tries to tell his grandmother everything but Olga interrupts them.
65	"Te voy a enterrar vivo"	4 February 2022	4.5
Adrián is furious when he learns that Andrea has decided to move in with Omar at the boarding house. Natalia goes to Adrián's house to get Andrea's things and Adrián wants to make amends for all the damage he did to Natalia. Chente tells Natalia that Olga and Adrián went out together, Adrián assures her that Olga was Chente's lover. Benjamín promises Olga not to say anything. Fernanda asks Mario not to waste her time. Chente invites Natalia to spend a few days at the beach. Adrián puts a stop to Claudio. Chole suspects she is pregnant. Pepe Pepe passes the exam. Natalia visits Constanza and after an argument, Constanza kicks her out of her house.
66	"No te voy a dar el divorcio"	7 February 2022	4.3
Samia is ready to accept Andrea as Omar's wife and wants to help organize their wedding. Juan Gabriel stops Olga from following her plan against Natalia. Gustavo asks Mario to be careful about his business dealings with Adrián. At Kimberly's insistence, Chole takes a pregnancy test and it turns out to be positive. Valentina tries to make Mario jealous by confessing that she is dating Juan Gabriel, without knowing the trouble she could get him into. Chente confronts Mario for allying with Adrián to ruin his business. Constanza apologizes to her niece, but Andrea no longer believes her word. Natalia seeks to be free of her commitments to Adrián and files for divorce, but he opposes.
67	"Nadie nos podrá separar"	8 February 2022	4.4
Adrián tries to conquer Natalia by force, but she does not allow it for any reason. Constanza looks for Andrea to convince her to be close to her son, however, she is surprised to learn that Chole and Gustavo want a child. Sinba insists Olga to give him his money. Olga takes advantage of Chente's proximity to ask him for a job at the restaurant. Adrián will use Sinba to ruin Chente's business. Valentina and Juan Gabriel arrive at the dinner with Mario and Fer, but the latter are surprised to see the couple's chemistry. Olga arrives at Adrián's house and after spending the night together, they are surprised by Andrea.
68	"La sazón de mi corazón"	9 February 2022	4.7
Andrea can't believe that her father betrayed his family for a woman, but Adrián manages to convince her that it was just a slip of the tongue. Natalia confronts Olga because she wants to know what is going on between her and Adrián. Lorenzo provokes Pepe Pepe's jealousy and unleashes a terrible fight. Regina decides to end her relationship with Pepe Pepe because of what happened with Lorenzo. Natalia and Chente celebrate the inauguration of their restaurant, but their happiness is ruined by the appearance of Adrián.
69	"Dios aprieta pero no ahorca"	10 February 2022	4.5
Regina confesses to Lorenzo that she has ended her relationship with Pepe Pepe. Natalia and Chente's restaurant is shut down because it does not meet some requirements for its opening. Chente's learns that his business was robbed, but he has a solution for this. Adrián is satisfied with the work of Sinba and his men, although he still has plans for Natalia to return to his side. Teresa is fed up with Claudio and his abuse. After the good reviews for the food at Natalia's restaurant, Chente decides to start over and support her, causing Olga’s jealousy.
70	"Una familia unida es indestructible"	11 February 2022	4.1
Mario offers Chente merchandise to help him get ahead with the repair shop. Natalia rejects Adrián's support after the closing of the restaurant, but later the visit of chef Téllez takes her by surprise. Adrián wants to separate Natalia from Chente by any means necessary, so he gives Olga a drug to set a trap for Chente. Constanza wants Andrea's son no matter what and Claudio is willing to become her servant, as long as she helps him become consul. Chente and Natalia are on their way home, but are intercepted by a group of hooded men who assault them. Adrián intervenes in the argument and is shot.
71	"Vamos a estar juntos para siempre"	14 February 2022	4.1
Mario confesses his love to Valentina, despite their differences. Olga decides to take a pregnancy test because of her symptoms and it is positive. Gustavo confronts Soledad because he believes that the child she is expecting is from another man, but Chole defends herself. Andrea visits her father in the hospital after the attack he suffered. Omar tries to put a stop to Constanza. Natalia visits Adrián in the hospital and he vows to give her a divorce. Olga uses the drops that Adrián gave her to put Chente to bed. Natalia returns to the Ramirez house, but is surprised to find Chente in his room in an intimate moment with Olga.
72	"Tu amor son puras mentiras"	15 February 2022	4.4
Natalia reveals to Chole everything that happened with Chente and she decides to support her. Claudio confesses to Constanza that Chole is expecting Gustavo's child and Constanza believes that her secret is in danger. Magos enters Chente's room and is surprised to see Olga in her underwear and asks her to leave the house. Natalia reveals the truth to Juanga and he runs home to confront Chente. Magos refuses to live under the same roof as Olga after seeing her in her grandson's bed. Chente seeks out Natalia to explain what happened with Olga, but she no longer believes his words.
73	"No quiero estar contigo"	16 February 2022	4.8
Olga reveals to Benjamín that Natalia has left home for good and she could be his new mother. Benjamín flees to Chole's house where he asks his father to leave. After suffering Benjamín’s rejection, Chente returns to the house to throw Olga out and she opposes him. Andrea asks her mother to do everything she can to attend her proposal. Olga returns to Chole's boarding house at Chente's request, but Natalia's presence there puts Soledad in trouble. Heliodoro Flores arrives at the Ramírez house to introduce himself as Magos' fiancé. Adrián convinces Natalia to return home, but she makes a condition.
74	"Te traje flores, amiga"	17 February 2022	4.8
In the middle of a party and surrounded by his loved ones, Omar finally manages to ask for Andrea's hand. Pepe Pepe’s drinking is about to ruin Andrea and Omar's engagement party. Verónica arrives at Adrián's house and takes Natalia by surprise. Constanza goes to Chole's boarding house to inform her that she and Gustavo will give each other a second chance. Chente looks for Natalia to ask her to believe in his word. Constanza only wants Gustavo to adopt his son, not as a couple. After a strong argument with Mario, Verónica returns to her room, but is expected by Elias.
75	"Mátame de amor"	18 February 2022	4.9
Natalia believes that Adrián is still cheating on her and decides to return to Chole's boarding house. Everything is ready for Regina's quinceañera party. Juanga plans to help Pepe Pepe to be forgiven by Regina. Pepe Pepe surprises Regina in the waltz and they kiss. Natalia prevents Verónica from ruining the party. Regina catches Pepe Pepe fighting with Lorenzo and this causes her disappointment. Despite the threats, Adrián spends the night with Verónica, but claims to love Natalia. Olga tells Chente that she is expecting his child, leaving him shocked.
76	"Una familia de sangre"	21 February 2022	4.5
Olga takes advantage of the fact that Natalia is at Chole's boarding house to tell her that she will become a mother after spending the night with Chente. Magos visits Olga to warn her that she will not allow Chente to fall into her trap, let alone get married. Natalia reveals to Chente that she already knows the whole truth. Natalia asks Chente to stop looking for her so she can worry about her daughters, but he refuses. Adrián takes advantage of the situation to try to take Natalia by force. Juan Gabriel supports Olga after learning the news of her pregnancy and accepts the child as his own.
77	"Esto va a ser un infierno"	22 February 2022	4.3
Olga is kicked out of Chole's boarding house and decides to return to the Ramirez's house, but is surprised to find that she is not as welcome as she thought. Teresa discovers Claudio's secret and puts a stop to his lies. Natalia asks Chente not to look for her for everyone's sake. Constanza sees Verónica, but is surprised to see that Elias is Verónica’s lover. Olga tries to convince Chente that he is the father of her child and asks him to make a family. Chente follows Juan Gabriel's advice and looks for Natalia to try to continue their relationship. Olga catches Chente kissing Natalia and this provokes a strong argument.
78	"Échale más cerillos al carbón"	23 February 2022	4.2
Chente tries to apologize to Olga for misinterpreting his attitudes. Pepe Pepe issues a strong warning to Lorenzo for getting close to Regina. Olga visits Adrián to make a confession. Teresa explodes against Claudio and asks him to get out of her sight. Adrián asks Olga to keep the news about his possible paternity from reaching Natalia's ears, but the argument comes to blows. Natalia puts a stop to Chente and wants him to stay away from her. Teresa receives a visit from Julián and he invites her to dinner. Pepe Pepe discovers that Regina is returning from her date with Lorenzo and warns her that Lorenzo only wants to take her to bed. Once again, Olga tries to torment Benjamín, but Chente's sudden appearance causes her to fall down the stairs and put her baby's life at risk.
79	"Me voy a casar con la Olga"	24 February 2022	4.7
Olga asks Chente to give her her place as the mother of his son and proposes marriage, which he accepts. Adrián shows up at Chole's inn to surprise Natalia. Olga shows up at Chole's inn to announce to everyone that Chente proposed to her and this news takes Natalia by surprise. Verónica arrives at Mario's apartment and makes strong revelations. Adrián shows up at Chente's refurbishing shop to ask him to leave the house that belongs to Natalia. Valentina visits Mario at his apartment and is surprised to find Verónica there, which causes her to lose control. Chente confesses to Natalia that he proposed to Olga, but she reacts by asking him to never forget the love she feels for him, even though they can no longer be together.
80	"Quiero el divorcio"	25 February 2022	4.5
Chente announces to his family that they must leave the house because it belongs to Natalia. Mario visits Verónica to ask for explanations about his sister's death. Olga tries to brag about her future wedding with Chente, but Sinba hears that it is all due to her pregnancy. Chente sees Sinba very close to Olga, but she says it is only to congratulate them on their wedding. Claudio arrives at Chole's house in an inconvenient state and discovers Teresa with another man. Juanga thinks that by talking to Olga he can win back her love, but he is rejected. Teresa is fed up with Claudio’s behavior and demands a divorce. Chente says goodbye to Natalia and gives her the house papers, but Benja shows up and refuses to leave with a plea to his father.
81	"Su marido es un criminal"	28 February 2022	4.3
Adrián and Elías' plans are in danger because everything indicates that they are being pursued by a spy. Chente makes it clear to Olga that he will not sleep next to her because he does not want to get her hopes up since he loves another woman. Natalia is detained by the police to ask for her support because of the crimes that Adrián, Elías and Mario have committed. Adrián kidnaps Verónica to ask her to leave the country in exchange for a large sum of money. Natalia tries to be convinced to become a spy for the police and report what is happening with Adrián and his friends. Samia arrives at her husband's office and is surprised to find him kissing Veronica. Mario assures Natalia that he has nothing to do with the crimes he is accused of. Natalia goes to Adrián's house to tell him that she is ready to continue their relationship.
82	"¡Eres un asesino!"	1 March 2022	4.4
Mario is threatened by the police with arrest if he tries to flee the country. Adrián arrives at the restaurant and shares the news of his reconciliation with Natalia, but this takes Chente by surprise. Chente confronts Natalia to ask for explanations for her reconciliation with Adrián, but she asks him to leave their history aside and to devote himself to his children. Natalia talks to Andrea and Regina about the crimes for which their father is being investigated, but asks them to keep it a secret. On their walk through the neighborhood, Pepe Pepe and his friends see Regina kissing Lorenzo. Sinba lashes out at Lorenzo and flees the scene, later Pepe Pepe finds Lorenzo lying in the street, but is accused of having beaten him.
83	"Que la vida te juzgue"	2 March 2022	4.4
Chente visits Pepe Pepe in jail and Pepe Pepe asks him for help to get out of jail. Olga arrives at Benjamín's room to threaten him once again, but she does not realize that a cell phone is recording everything. Chente complains to Natalia about Regina's reaction when she blames Pepe Pepe for a crime he did not commit. In the middle of the discussion, Chente admits he regrets meeting her. Lorenzo suffers an aftermath after his blow and discovers that his limbs are unresponsive. Elías proposes to Constanza that they do whatever is necessary for Andrea and Omar's son to grow up away from his parents. Verónica arrives at the Robles family reunion to reveal that Constanza knew about her relationship with Adrián. Natalia explodes against Constanza and lashes out at her.
84	"Los muertos no hablan"	3 March 2022	5.0
Sinba and his men enter Natalia's house on Adrián's orders; however, everything gets out of control when Natalia discovers him and Chente tries to protect her. Chente and Juan Gabriel confront Sinba because they know he broke into Natalia's house. Sinba accepts his mistakes, but tries to convince Chente to let him go in exchange for information he has about Olga. Adrián shoots Sinba so that he will not reveal anything about his plans. In the midst of his agony, Sinba confesses that the child Olga is expecting is his. Chente confronts Olga and lets her know that Sinba has already told him the truth about the child she is expecting.
85	"No me voy a condenar"	4 March 2022	4.7
Natalia opposes Adrián's support and he ends up taking the things he had given her for the restaurant. On her knees, Olga asks Chente to believe her word and not Sinba's because the son she is expecting is a Ramírez. Gustavo returns repentantly to Chole's salon to apologize, but she rejects him. Regina is surprised to see that Lorenzo can walk. Chente thinks there is still hope of getting back together with Natalia and confesses that he wants to cancel his wedding with Olga. Chente talks to Olga to inform her that their wedding is postponed until they are sure that the child she is expecting is his. Olga looks for Natalia at her house and confesses everything that happened with Sinba, but takes the opportunity to tell her that she is leaving the path clear for her to be with Chente.
86	"El día más feliz de mi vida"	7 March 2022	4.8
Pepe Pepe confesses to Regina everything Lorenzo wanted to do with her and later proves it. Constanza is sad because she is alone, but she begins to rave about the supposed child she is expecting. Despite everything that Chente and Natalia did to recover their relationship, he decides to continue with his wedding plans with Olga. Everything is ready for Andrea and Omar’s wedding. Olga is kidnapped by Sinba's friends on her way to the church. Chente discovers the video in which his son is mistreated by Olga.
87	"Juntos por siempre"	8 March 2022	4.7
Benjamín confesses the whole truth about Olga to his father, who apologizes for not having been by his side. Gustavo asks Chole to forgive him for the mistakes he made by doubting his son. Chente returns to Natalia's house and reveals that his wedding with Olga did not take place. Natalia learns of Olga's mistreatment of Benjamín and runs into his arms to assure him that she will always protect him. Chente proposes to Natalia to rebuild their life now that they are both free. Natalia agrees to live with Chente, but first she needs to unmask Adrián. Mario tries to convince Valentina that the best thing for both of them is to live together in his apartment, but she opposes because she does not plan to move away from the neighborhood. Seeing that their plans are completely different, Mario decides to break off his relationship with Valentina.
88	"Soltar el anzuelo"	9 March 2022	4.6
Pepe Pepe resumes his classes at school and wants to get back together with Regina. Adrián confronts Natalia to ask her what will happen to their relationship; however, Adrian visits Verónica to confirm that his plans to take Natalia's money are still on track. Natalia installs a virus in Adrián's computer to give the police access to her husband's documents, but everything gets complicated when Adrián shows up at the house. Verónica visits Chente to try to find out what happened with Olga. Natalia manages to convince Adrián that he was only using his computer to find recipes. Tere explains to Julián that she can no longer be by his side because she wants to support her husband in his alcoholism rehabilitation. Months later, Natalia and Chente get their house ready to move into. After several months of absence, Olga reappears in a coma at a community health center.
89	"Perdiste el juicio"	10 March 2022	5.0
Mario confronts Adrián for everything he has done against him, he even believes he killed his sister. Constanza discovers that Chole is expecting a baby girl and arrives at her house to kill her. Chente, Juanga and Gustavo arrive at Chole's house to rescue her. Verónica discovers Olga's location and is surprised to see her awake. Constanza commits suicide by ingesting a series of drugs to avoid going to a psychiatric clinic.
90	"No hay nada mejor que la venganza"	11 March 2022	5.1
Elías applauds Constanza's performance as she pretends to be dead. Olga communicates with Chente. Andrea is about to give birth. Chente arrives to pay his condolences to Natalia and Adrián confronts him. Andrea becomes a mother. Olga looks for Chente at Benjamín's school to give him an explanation, he wants nothing to do with her. Natalia discovers that Verónica wants revenge on Adrián so she is willing to help her. Elías kidnaps Andrea's son. Olga surprises Benjamín in the park.
91	"Amor de papá"	13 March 2022	5.2
92	"Llenos de amor"	13 March 2022	5.2
Andrea is disappointed to find her father in Verónica's bed. Claudio's health deteriorates due to alcohol and he must undergo emergency surgery, but Fernanda gives Teresa terrible news. Elías tries to flee from the police, but believes he killed his son and decides to commit suicide. The police arrive at Constanza's location and she is arrested for kidnapping Andrea's baby. Olga kidnaps Benjamín and assures him that she will end his life, just as what happened to her baby. Natalia and Chente arrive to save Benjamín, but find him with a vest full of explosives. Olga tells the whole truth and admits that the son she was expecting was Adrián's. Olga is willing to free Benjamín in exchange for a kiss of love from Chente. The bomb vest is defused thanks to the police and Olga is arrested. Adrián arrives at Verónica's house to ask for Natalia's money, after a fierce fight they both end up dead from poisoning. In prison, Olga is surrounded by the inmates who seek revenge on her for tormenting Benjamín. In the company of their loved ones and a big party, Natalia and Chente get married.

== Reception ==
=== Ratings ===
Viewership and ratings per season of Mi fortuna es amarte
Season	Timeslot (CT)	Episodes	First aired		Last aired		Avg. viewers (millions)
Season	Timeslot (CT)	Episodes	Date	Viewers (millions)	Date	Viewers (millions)	Avg. viewers (millions)
1	Mon–Fri 8:30 p.m.	88 (Note: Should reflect the number of episodes that contribute to the average given in the last column.)	8 November 2021	3.7	13 March 2022	5.2	4.17

=== Awards and nominations ===
Year	Award	Category	Recipient	Results	Ref.
2022	Premios Juventud	Best On-Screen Couple	Susana González and David Zepeda	Nominated	
