= Mi camino es amarte =

Mexican telenovela

- Genre: Telenovela
- Based on: El camionero by Luis López Aliaga
- Developed by: Juan Carlos Alcalá
- Written by: Rosa Salazar; Julián Aguilar; Rubén Núñez
- Directed by: Alejandro Gamboa; Isaías Gómez May
- Starring: Susana González; Gabriel Soto; Mark Tacher; Ximena Herrera
- Theme music composer: J. Eduardo Murguía; Mauricio L. Arriaga
- Opening theme: "Mi camino es amarte" by Luis Angel "El Flaco"
- Composer: Álvaro Trespalacios
- Country of origin: Mexico
- Original language: Spanish
- No. of seasons: 1
- No. of episodes: 92

Production
- Executive producer: Nicandro Díaz González
- Producer: J. Antonio Arvizu Velázquez
- Editors: Mauricio Coronel; Rodrigo Morales
- Production company: TelevisaUnivision

Original release
- Network: Las Estrellas
- Release: 7 November 2022 – 12 March 2023

Mi camino es amarte (English title: The Path of Love) is a Mexican telenovela that aired on Las Estrellas from 7 November 2022 to 12 March 2023. The series is produced by Nicandro Díaz González. It is an adaptation of the Chilean telenovela El camionero, created by Luis López Aliaga. It stars Susana González, Gabriel Soto, Mark Tacher and Ximena Herrera.

== Plot ==
Memo Santos Pérez makes a living driving his trailer. In addition to being loving to his family, he wants to form a home with Úrsula, a woman with a dark past whom he has just proposed to. When his life plans are underway, Olivia, his ex-girlfriend, on the verge of death, confesses to him that they had a daughter and asks him to look for her at the home of Daniela Gallardo and Fausto Beltran, Isabella's adoptive parents. Memo goes to the Beltrán family's house to meet his daughter, where he is mistaken for Daniela's new assistant.

Daniela is successful a landscape designer who has been unable to fulfill her dream of carrying a child in her womb. Memo decides to work with Daniela to be close to Isabella, while he confirms with a DNA test that he is her father. Thanks to the daily coexistence, Memo becomes Daniela's confidant and that is how he discovers the loneliness she lives in her marriage and that her only reason in life is Isabella. Daniela and Memo begin to fall in love, but they decide to keep their feelings quiet in order to respect their commitments to their partners.

== Cast ==
=== Main ===
- Susana González as Daniela Gallardo
- Gabriel Soto as Guillermo "Memo" Santos Pérez
- Mark Tacher as Fausto Beltrán
- Ximena Herrera as Karen Zambrano
- Sara Corrales as Úrsula Hernández
- Mónika Sánchez as Amparo Santos
- Sergio Reynoso as Humberto Santos
- Leonardo Daniel as Eugenio Zambrano
- Fabián Robles as Aarón Peláez
- Alfredo Gatica as César Ramírez
- Camille Mina as Isabella Beltrán
- André Sebastián as José María "Chema" Hernández
- Ara Saldívar as Jesusa "Chuchita" Galván
- Julián Figueroa as Leonardo Santos
- María Prado as Nélida
- Araceli Adame as Berenice
- Karla Esquivel as Gabriela "Gaby" Hernández
- Rodrigo Brand as Juan Pablo "Juanpa" Gallardo
- Diana Haro as Guadalupe "Lupita" Hernández
- Carlos Said as Sebastián Zambrano
- Alberto Estrella as Macario Hernández
- Gabriela Zamora as Yolanda
- Maya Tierrablanca as Graciela "Grace"
- Nicole Curiel as Estefanía Maldonado
- Rosa Gloria Chagoyán as Lola "La Trailera"

=== Recurring and guest stars ===
- Claudia Álvarez as Olivia
- Íngrid Martz as Martina
- Mónica Port as Claudia Altamirano
- Marco Uriel as Dr. Óscar Villalba
- Archie Lafranco as Jorge Altamirano
- Víctor Alfredo Jiménez as Roshi
- Jorge Ugalde as Arturo Robles
- Rossana San Juan as Zulema
- Martha Julia as Marisol

== Production ==
In May 2022, it was reported that Nicandro Díaz González was producing an adaption of the Chilean telenovela El camionero, and that casting had begun. On 6 July 2022, Gabriel Soto, Susana González, Mark Tacher and Ximena Herrera were announced in the lead roles, with the working title of the telenovela being Los caminos del amor. Filming of the telenovela began on 25 July 2022. On 23 August 2022, during a blessing ceremony, Mi camino es amarte was announced as the official title of the telenovela. Filming concluded in January 2023.

== Episodes ==
No.	Title	Original release date	Mexico viewers (millions)
1	"Virgen santísima… ¡tengo una hija!"	7 November 2022 (Note: Premiered early online through Las Estrellas website on 4 November 2022.)	3.2
Daniela seeks her husband's help because her car broke down, but Fausto cannot because he is sleeping with her best friend Karen. Memo arrives home to a surprise birthday party. Memo has an unexpected visit that informs him of Olivia's death, and receives a letter in which she assures him that she had a daughter with him. Memo arrives at Daniela's house to see his daughter and meets Daniela, but she mistakes him for her assistant and asks him for a ride. Daniela needs to pick up her daughter, Isabella, from school and Memo offers to take her so he can meet his daughter.
2	"Pecar de inocente"	8 November 2022	3.6
Memo finally meets Isabella and makes a good impression. Úrsula is angry at Memo for standing her up. After an argument with his niece, Macario warns Úrsula about ruining her future with Memo by revealing that she is married. Daniela is disappointed in Fausto after he fell asleep on the romantic evening she had arranged. Memo tries to comfort Daniela, but Isabella believes her mother is in danger.
3	"Como la sal y la pimienta"	9 November 2022	3.5
Fausto tells Karen that he can't stand his marriage to Daniela, but he will have to put up with it until he receives his father's inheritance. Memo notices Daniela's sadness and takes her to a special place, where Daniela confesses the crisis she is going through in her marriage. Úrsula arrives for Daniela's truck and surprises Memo with an effusive hug, but feels jealous of Daniela. Memo approaches Isabella to give her his telescope and confess that he didn't do anything to her mother, and they become friends again.
4	"¡Se ven fabulosos juntos!"	10 November 2022	3.1
Memo tells Úrsula that he is going to a business dinner with Daniela and this makes Úrsula jealous. The project Memo and Daniela have with their clients turns out to be a success thanks to Memo. Memo assures Daniela that she is a very special woman. Chema plays with his friends, but when he tries to retrieve the ball, he is about to be run over by a truck.
5	"¿Qué te está dando esa mujer?"	11 November 2022	3.2
Úrsula manages to save Chema from being run over by a truck. Fausto and Karen are about to be caught by Daniela while kissing. Daniela defends Memo from Fausto's insults. Memo decides to spend a few days with Úrsula and away from everyone, but the plans are interrupted by a call from Daniela. Memo tells Úrsula that they have to return from their trip and she questions him about whether he is interested in Daniela. Úrsula gets furious and flees the cabin.
6	"¡Eres mi esposa!"	14 November 2022	3.5
Daniela senses Fausto's discomfort when she approaches him. César comes back into Úrsula's life and threatens to expose her if she does not pay him the 30 thousand pesos. Fausto remembers how he was discovered by his father in the crimes he committed against the company. Fausto looks for Amparo to ask her to sell him the land she lives on. Macario loses the horse bet. Isabella and Daniela arrive at Amparo's restaurant and Isabella meets her family.
7	"Memo es indispensable para mí"	15 November 2022	3.6
Memo receives the results of the paternity test on Isabella and verifies that the minor is a Santos. Macario tries to make a business deal with Fausto and Karen about Amparo's land. Úrsula feels jealous of Daniela and shows it. Karen hints to Daniela that she might be in love with Memo, but she states that the most important thing is her family. Úrsula complains to Macario for what he did to help César find her location. Daniela finds Karen's dress among Fausto's clothes and confronts him.
8	"Puede contar conmigo siempre"	16 November 2022	3.3
Fausto confesses to Daniela that the dress was for her, but Daniela does not believe him. Úrsula looks for César and in the middle of the discussion, César's past comes to light. César does not intend to divorce Úrsula and is willing to confess that she was an accomplice to a crime. Daniela wants to end her marriage to Fausto, but he opposes. In the midst of the drunkenness, Memo confesses to Daniela the love disappointments he has had and she assures him that any woman would be happy to be by his side. Daniela asks Karen to help her discover Fausto's lover. Isabella overhears a conversation with her father in which he reveals that she is adopted.
9	"¡Soy una adoptada!"	17 November 2022	3.6
Isabella tells Memo that she is adopted and asks him to let her live with him, Memo tries to console her. Daniela forgives Fausto after learning that Karen bought the dress for the couple. Isabella confesses to her parents that she already knows she is adopted, Daniela and Fausto are surprised. Daniela assures Isabella that she loves her and explains where her biological mother is.
10	"Me cansé de ser tu amante"	18 November 2022	3.4
Daniela asks Fausto to find out the name of Isabella's biological mother, but he refuses to reveal it. Karen remembers what she did to cause Daniela to lose her baby by ingesting the pills she put in her drink. Memo and César meet, causing Úrsula's discomfort. Fausto discovers that Karen did show up for their date, which is why he prefers to spend the day with her rather than keep his word with Isabella. Memo attends Isabella's school reunion and captivates the children by telling them about his job as a truck driver.
11	"¡Qué noche!"	21 November 2022	3.1
Memo finds Fausto and Karen kissing outside Amparo's restaurant. Despite Fausto's insistence on selling the restaurant's land, Memo refuses to do away with his family's memories. Daniela runs into Memo in the middle of a tour of the Santos family home and the chemistry between them overwhelms Úrsula's jealousy. Úrsula arrives at Daniela's house to apologize for her outburst.
12	"Tu peor pesadilla"	22 November 2022	3.2
Marcial looks for Amparo to offer her a deal on the publication of a book of her recipes. Daniela and Fausto meet Karen and Aarón at a restaurant, provoking Karen's jealousy. Memo reveals to Fausto that he knows the whole truth about his relationship with Karen. César proposes to Úrsula that they go back to robbing as they did before and she accepts.
13	"Usted me salvó"	23 November 2022	3.5
César and Úrsula try to steal Daniela's belongings, but Memo notices this and saves Daniela. Fausto confesses to Karen that Memo already knows about their relationship, so she assures him that she has no problem, but he ends up threatening her if he loses all his money. Úrsula tries to get Memo's attention to avoid the subject of the robbery at Daniela's house, but Memo keeps thinking about Daniela. César finds Memo and complains to him for supposedly cheating on Úrsula with Daniela.
14	"La sangre llama"	24 November 2022	3.4
Fausto pretends to play with Isabella and asks her to find Memo to get his cell phone. Memo discovers that Fausto used Isabella to erase all evidence of his infidelity. Amparo overhears Memo talking about his daughter and when she confronts him she discovers that Isabella is Memo's daughter. Fausto and Karen take advantage of the fact that Daniela is away from the office to make out, but they are almost caught. Úrsula overhears part of the conversation between Memo and Amparo where they talk about his secret.
15	"Nadie toca lo que es mío"	25 November 2022	3.6
Daniela is disappointed to learn that Úrsula will accompany Memo to Acapulco, Fausto decides to go with them at the last minute. In Acapulco, Úrsula tells Daniela about her plans for her wedding to Memo. Seeing that neither can stand the other's partner, Úrsula proposes to Fausto that they work together to end Daniela and Memo's friendship. After seeing Memo with Chema and Isabella, Úrsula pressures him to become parents soon after the wedding.
16	"Apiádate de nuestro dolor"	28 November 2022	3.5
Memo decides to confess to Daniela that he is Isabella's father, but Isabella suffers an accident. Fausto is furious to see Daniela accompanied by Memo in the hospital. Isabella's doctor reveals that her condition is delicate. Karen enter Isabella's room and tries to kill her, blaming her for not being able to be happy next to Fausto. Karen is discovered by one of nurses, ruining her plans to kill Isabella.
17	"Gracias a ti mi hija está viva"	29 November 2022	3.4
Karen surprises Fausto in his room, but he asks her to leave because he needs to be by Daniela's side and puts an end to their relationship. Isabella's health condition improves after she wakes up from the coma, Memo and Daniela celebrate with a kiss.
18	"No puedo olvidar ese beso"	30 November 2022	3.5
Fausto is surprised by Isabella's decision to see Memo first and not him. Fausto asks Daniela to keep fighting for their marriage and she accepts. Macario reveals to Úrsula that Isabella is Memo's daughter. Memo shows up at Daniela's house and despite their agreement not to talk about what happened between them, they kiss again.
19	"Estoy empezando a sentir algo por él"	1 December 2022	3.1
Karen wants Fausto out of the company, but he opposes. Úrsula gives Isabella a gift to win her affection. Macario tells Úrsula that she needs to have a son with Memo in order to keep him by her side. Daniela confesses to Karen that she kissed Memo while they were in the hospital.
20	"Esto se pone color de hormiga"	2 December 2022	3.2
Health inspectors arrive at Amparo's restaurant and due to the conditions it is closed, causing Humberto to almost suffer a heart attack. Úrsula discovers Macario's plans and he is sure that Amparo is going to sell the restaurant's land after what happened. Karen finds Memo at Daniela's house and wants to clarify what happened at her father's party, but he refuses to listen to her. When he refuses, Karen questions him about his true intentions with Daniela.
21	"¡No vamos a vender!"	5 December 2022	3.4
Memo avoids an argument with Karen and makes it clear that he will not be the one to let her have her way with Fausto. Úrsula plans to bribe a doctor to help her fake her pregnancy to keep Memo. Amparo rejects Fausto's idea to sell her family's land. Daniela tells Memo that Isabella has disappeared. Memo discovers that Isabella is with Chema.
22	"No quiero volverte a ver"	6 December 2022	3.1
Fausto complains to Daniela about her closeness with Memo and questions her about whether she likes him. Karen asks Daniela to consider starting a relationship with Memo, she objects because of her family with Fausto. Daniela decides to end her friendship with Memo rather than have her feelings for him exposed.
23	"Me voy a volver loco"	7 December 2022	3.3
Memo confesses to Úrsula that Isabella is his daughter, but is surprised by her support in his paternity. Úrsula asks Memo to fight for custody of Isabella to start a family.
24	"Lo peor que le pudo pasar a la familia"	8 December 2022	3.4
Úrsula insists to Memo that he must find a lawyer to help him get Isabella back. Humberto overhears Macario's conversation with the inspector who closed the restaurant and discovers that he was to blame for the closure. Gaby and Lupita listen to the discussion between Macario and Humberto about the closing of the restaurant, Macario asks Gaby for forgiveness.
25	"La familia está en juego"	9 December 2022	3.0
Memo cannot bear to hear Isabella crying because of him and decides to go to Daniela's house. Fausto arrives home and finds Memo playing with Isabella, which causes great displeasure. Humberto helps Macario to fix his problems with the inspector. Karen seeks out Fausto to warn him that she is willing to reveal everything about their relationship if Memo does not go back to work with Daniela.
26	"Vengo a pedirte que regreses"	12 December 2022	2.9
Karen is willing to do whatever it takes to get Memo back together with Daniela and for this she kisses Daniela's new assistant. Amparo overhears her Lupita's argument with Macario and when confronting them, Lupita confesses that her father wanted to sell the restaurant. Memo and Leonardo discover that Macario was behind the closing of the restaurant and confront him. Daniela follows Fausto's advice about Memo and when looking for him again, she finds herself in an awkward moment because he is kissing Úrsula.
27	"El mundo no es un cuento de hadas"	13 December 2022	3.6
Daniela looks for Memo and despite Úrsula's jealousy, manages to ask him to come back to work with her. Isabella bursts into tears when she hears her parents arguing and Fausto explodes with anger when she assures him that she wants Memo as a father. After the argument with Daniela, Fausto flees into Karen's arms. Daniela wakes up and discovers that Fausto did not come home, despite her discomfort, she can't stop thinking about Memo's kisses.
28	"¡Memo es el papá de Isabella!"	14 December 2022	3.3
Fausto receives a visit from Úrsula in his office and she reveals that the reason why Memo is close to Isabella is because Isabella is his daughter. Daniela and Memo admit to being in love with each other and they decide to end their relationships in order to be happy together. Úrsula confesses to Memo that she is pregnant, ruining their plans to separate. Fausto comes forward before the decision of his divorce with Daniela and confesses to her the truth about Memo and Isabella.
29	"Me has estado engañando"	15 December 2022	3.4
Ursula is upset because Memo did not react in the best way to her pregnancy. Daniela learns that Memo is Isabella's biological father and Fausto makes her see that she was betrayed. After losing another bet, Macario returns to Amparo's kitchen and discovers his wife next to Eugenio, making him jealous. Memo goes to Daniela's house to reveal the truth, but she tells him that she already knows that he is Isabella's biological father. Memo admits to Daniela and Fausto that he is Isabella's father, but tells them how he found out everything.
30	"Quiere quitarnos a nuestra hija"	16 December 2022	3.2
Memo assures that Fausto is lying about how he found out the secret, Úrsula avoids continuing the conversation. Memo fears that his daughter does not know the truth about him. Isabella arrives home and looks for Memo, but Fausto is furious and asks Daniela to do what she can to avoid talking about Memo.
31	"Una declaración de guerra"	19 December 2022	3.1
Daniela confesses to Karen that she fell in love with Memo, but he only used her to be close to Isabella. Fausto asks Aarón to get Memo out of his life forever. Fausto meets Memo in a park to offer him money in exchange for him to stay away from his family, but it's a trap so that Aarón can kill Memo.
32	"Pelea por tu hija"	20 December 2022	3.1
Aarón puts a condition to Fausto to get rid of Memo and that is that he keeps his word to be a shareholder of the company, otherwise he will be in danger. Úrsula insists that Memo hire a lawyer to fight for Isabella. Fausto asks Daniela to leave the country with Isabella to avoid any misfortune with Memo. Daniela looks for Memo to complain about what he did, but he admits that everything he felt for her was true and apologizes.
33	"Tengo que olvidar mis sentimientos"	21 December 2022	3.1
Memo wants Isabella to know the whole truth and asks Daniela for her support, in the middle of the conversation, they are surprised by Úrsula. Fausto looks for Karen to ask her whose side she is on, after learning that she told Daniela about Úrsula's presence in his office. Daniela wants to talk to Karen about her visit to Memo's house and almost finds her with Fausto in bed.
34	"Juntos iniciemos esta batalla"	22 December 2022	3.1
Daniela suggests to Fausto that the best thing for everyone is to keep Memo close and know his every move. Karen looks for Memo to tell him that Úrsula was the one who revealed to Fausto everything about Isabella's paternity.
35	"En esta vida todo se paga"	23 December 2022	2.8
César threatens Úrsula with revealing what is going on with her if she does not pay him the money he is asking for. Memo asks Úrsula to visit the doctor to find out how their baby is doing, but she is afraid that her secret will come out. Daniela tells Memo that the whole life they had planned together was ruined by his lies.
36	"Nunca debí enamorarme de ti"	26 December 2022	3.0
Memo accepts that he is in love with Daniela, but Daniela puts a stop to his love. Memo complains to Úrsula for revealing that he is Isabella's biological father and ends up admitting to her that he kissed Daniela. Úrsula gives Memo another chance but demands that he forget about Daniela forever. Daniela is determined to save her marriage for the sake of Isabella.
37	"Hay que poner tierra entre los dos"	27 December 2022	3.4
César learns that Úrsula is pregnant. Macario plans with Yolanda to take Amparo's land from her. Daniela wants to confess to Fausto that she kissed Memo. Memo no longer wants to work with Daniela. César looks for Úrsula and wants to take her to Tijuana. Daniela and Memo say goodbye forever. Úrsula confesses to César that she is not pregnant, but he still wants to take her away.
38	"No me vas a quitar lo que más amo"	28 December 2022	3.0
Fausto can't stand seeing Karen with her boyfriend in the office. Memo tells Amparo that he fell in love with Daniela. César blackmails Macario after discovering him with his mistress. Amparo wants Isabela to be at Memo's wedding. Karen tells Amparo the truth about Úrsula. Memo doubts about marrying Úrsula. Úrsula drugs César to prevent him from interrupting her wedding.
39	"Los declaro marido y mujer"	29 December 2022	3.5
Amparo doubts about Úrsula's pregnancy after Karen's warning, so she asks her to take a test in front of her. Fausto does not want Isabela to go to Memo's wedding. Amparo confirms that Úrsula is pregnant. César arrives at the wedding and threatens Úrsula. Daniela takes Isabela to Memo's wedding. Memo and Úrsula get married. Fausto breaks Karen's heart. Fausto arrives at Memo's wedding to take Daniela and Isabela home.
40	"La noche de bodas se echó a perder"	30 December 2022	3.3
Fausto takes Daniela and Isabela away from Memo's wedding. Macario and César create an alliance. Fausto argues with Daniela for taking Isabela to the wedding. Memo does not stop thinking about Daniela, so he cannot fulfill Úrsula on their wedding night. Úrsula, unable to be with Memo, meets with César. Úrsula does not forgive Amparo.
41	"¡Isabella nunca conocerá a su padre!"	2 January 2023	3.3
Karen tells Daniela and Fausto about her plans with Aarón, but this provokes Fausto's jealousy. Daniela meets with Memo to talk about Isabella, but Fausto is opposed to Isabella knowing the truth about her biological father.
42	"¿Estás enamorada de Memo?"	3 January 2023	3.5
Macario discovers that César plans to sell Úrsula's baby and proposes to join him, César accepts. Fausto offers to clear the way for Aaron to be with Karen, if he agrees to kill Memo. Daniela's decides to end her relationship with Fausto and when he questions her, she admits that she does not love him. Fausto lashes out at Karen for causing Daniela to want to separate from him.
43	"Quiero conocer a mi otro papá"	4 January 2023	3.4
Karen wants to take revenge on Fausto for assuring her that he will never marry her, even though he has separated from Daniela. Fausto asks Aarón to kill Memo, Aarón refuses, but gives Fausto a gun to do it himself. Fausto threatens Aarón, but Aarón tells him that he will reveal all his secrets. Isabella asks her parents to look for her biological father and Fausto accepts. Aarón proposes to Karen, leaving her surprised. Karen refuses to be Aarón's wife, but proposes to ally with him in order to finish off Fausto for all the bad things he has done to them.
44	"Daniela siempre va a formar parte de mi vida"	5 January 2023	3.4
Fausto agrees to tell Isabella the truth about her biological father in exchange for Daniela forgetting about the divorce. Memo arrives at his appointment with Daniela to talk about Isabella's future and they are surprised by Úrsula in the middle of an embrace. Úrsula feels jealous and slaps Daniela. Memo warns Úrsula that he will always be tied to Daniela because she is Isabella's mother. After a strong argument with Memo, Úrsula begins suffering from pains.
45	"Peligro en el camino"	6 January 2023	3.1
After the argument with Úrsula, Daniela is convinced that Memo is not for her. Fausto arrives at the construction company and discovers that Aarón is the new partner, but his anger increases when he learns that he has more power than him. César hides in the trailer and wounds Memo. César chases Memo when he realizes that he could not kill him, but in the middle of the fight, a glass pierces César's neck and he dies.
46	"Matar dos sapos de una pedrada"	9 January 2023	3.6
Úrsula arrives at the hospital and Memo reveals that César was the person who assaulted him and that he died in the middle of the robbery. Daniela interrupts a romantic moment between Memo and Úrsula to give him a drawing that Isabella made and this provokes Úrsula's jealousy. Úrsula confronts Fausto for having tried to kill Memo and makes it clear that if he does not comply, she could show the recording in which he confesses his guilt.
47	"Me muero sin ella"	10 January 2023	3.2
Aarón arrives by surprise at Karen's house, where Fausto is spending an intimate moment with her. Unable to stop thinking about the words Memo said to Úrsula in the hospital, Daniela suffers a car accident. Daniela mistakenly calls Memo after her accident, and he goes to help her. Fausto arrives at the hospital and after seeing Memo, he questions him about whether he has an intimate relationship with Daneila.
48	"Vas a saber de lo que soy capaz"	11 January 2023	3.9
JuanPa confronts Fausto for not keeping his word and leaving Daniela's house. Úrsula calls Daniela to complain because she thinks she wants to get Memo's attention, and ends up threatening her. The image of César still lingers in Úrsula's mind and she cannot stop thinking about him. Fausto tries to win Daniela back, he takes her by force, but they are observed by Karen.
49	"Un amor imposible"	12 January 2023	3.7
Daniela stops Fausto from kissing her. Macario loses control when he sees his Amparo hugging Eugenio. Daniela confirms to Karen that she stopped loving Fausto for an impossible love like Memo. Memo confronts Úrsula for threatening Daniela and getting him in trouble, to the point of not being able to see Isabella anymore. After the scandal he caused at the restaurant, Macario tries to apologize to Amparo, but she no longer believes his word and kicks him out.
50	"El momento adecuado"	13 January 2023	3.2
Karen is certain that Daniela fell madly in love with Memo and Daniela admits it, Chuchita overhears their conversation. Isabella asks Memo for his help to find her real father. Úrsula tells Memo that it is best to tell the truth, but he decides to hold back. Karen assures Fausto that Daniela could divorce him even though he is against it, but Fausto does not want to lose his inheritance and that he prefers to become widowed.
51	"Tenemos que contarle la verdad"	16 January 2023	3.6
Daniela asks Fausto to visit Isabella's psychologist because the day to tell her the truth is near, but Fausto makes any excuse to avoid it. Karen questions her father about his feelings for Amparo and Eugenio admits that he likes Amparo. Macario visits Amparo at the restaurant to assure her that he will leave her so she can start her life with Eugenio, if she wants to. Macario contacts the people who will buy Úrsula's baby and, in addition to informing them of César's death, takes the opportunity to close the deal.
52	"Me siento tan deshonesta"	17 January 2023	3.3
Fausto reveals at the board meeting that Aarón sold him part of his shares. Karen confronts Aarón for what he did with Fausto and believes it is all a plan to ruin her life. Karen exposes Fausto in front of Daniela and it's about Isabella's secret. Fausto asks Daniela to confess the reasons why she hid the kiss from Memo. Daniela confronts Karen because she believes that she revealed to Fausto about the kiss with Memo. Karen tells Daniela that she is going to live in Europe and this provokes Fausto's anger.
53	"Este amor nos hace daño"	18 January 2023	3.6
Fausto calls Karen and asks her not to leave, she puts an end to their relationship and decides to leave him. Ana María, Isabella's psychologist, questions Memo and Daniela about whether there is a relationship between them, she thinks it is not the right time to tell Isabella the truth. After this, Daniela and Memo decide to end their relationship. Memo reveals to Úrsula what happened with Isabella's psychologist, but Úrsula confronts him because she believes it is about the relationship he has with Daniela.
54	"Necesito que lo odie"	19 January 2023	3.6
Fausto tells Daniela that he investigated Memo's past and reveals that he abandoned Isabella's biological mother and gave her for adoption. Isabella overhears her parents' conversation and questions them about what she has just heard, but Daniela lies and informs her that it is a family vacation plan. Gaby and Lupita learn that their father is dating another woman and soon confront him. Daniela wants to know if what Fausto told her is true and goes to the prison to find out.
55	"¡No te vas a llevar a mi hija!"	20 January 2023	3.4
Daniela goes to the prison and after talking to the woman with whom Olivia shared a cell, she realizes that Fausto told her the truth. Amparo goes to Macario's apartment and finds him in bed with another woman. After talking to Fausto, Daniela arrives at Isabella's school and sees her in Memo's truck, which makes her think that he wants to take her away.
56	"Soy tu papá de verdad"	23 January 2023	3.5
Daniela confesses to JuanPa that she fell in love with Memo, but she stopped believing his word because he lied to her about his paternity. Memo and the Santos family meet with a lawyer to find out if there is anything to do to reunite with Isabella, but everything gets complicated. Memo arrives at the airport and upon seeing Daniela and Fausto take his daughter away, he has no choice but to confess to Isabella that he is her real father. Memo is willing to fight for Isabella, even if it means confronting Daniela.
57	"¿Por qué me mintieron?"	24 January 2023	3.6
After receiving Macario's gift, Amparo confronts him, throws him out of the house and tells him that she will file for divorce. Daniela reappears with Isabella at Martina's restaurant, Isabella wants to know why they hid from her for so long that Memo was her real father. Daniela warns Memo that he will see Isabella only with her or Fausto's authorization, because of the lie about Olivia's death. Memo warns Daniela that he will fight for custody of Isabella.
58	"No te voy a querer nunca"	25 January 2023	3.7
Isabella overhears her parents' conversation in which Daniela assures that Memo will take legal action to separate them from her. Memo meets Isabella at JuanPa's competition, but she rejects him. Macario surprises the Santos family by appearing publicly with Yolanda, his new girlfriend, this causes Lupita to be disappointed in him.
59	"Yo siempre te amaré"	26 January 2023	3.6
Memo looks for Isabella once again; despite Fausto's opposition, she agrees to talk to him. In tears, Memo accepts that Isabella should be with her adoptive parents and assures her that he will not insist on seeing her until she wants to. Macario receives a call in which he plans to steal Ursula's baby in exchange for a sum of money. Amparo is surprised when she arrives at the signing of her divorce and Macario wants half of the land of the truck stop.
60	"¿Qué clase de monstruo crees que soy?"	27 January 2023	3.9
Fausto insists on getting his fortune no matter what, including killing Daniela and he assures Aarón of this. Daniela confronts Memo for what he did with Olivia, but Memo tells her that he never hurt Olivia and would not be able to give up his daughter for adoption. Daniela doubts at first, but later believes Memo's version and they want to find out what really happened with Isabella's birth mother. Daniela recovers her time with Memo and realizes that it was a mistake not to have clarified Olivia's situation earlier.
61	"¿Amigos para siempre?"	30 January 2023	3.6
Daniela and Memo want to do what is best for Isabella, but they have to put aside their relationship to be friends. Fausto fires Chuchita for being Daniela's accomplice.
62	"¡Me dijo papá!"	31 January 2023	3.8
Fausto arrives at the truck stop and confronts Memo after finding out that he saw Daniela again and questions him about whether there is an affair. Memo sees Isabella in the park and after assuring her that he did not do anything to Olivia, Isabella regains Memo's trust and calls him dad. Úrsula confesses to Macario that she spied on Memo while he was seeing Isabella, but Memo listens to the whole conversation.
63	"Quiero que seamos amigas"	1 February 2023	3.4
Úrsula assures Macario that if Memo dares to leave her she is capable of killing him. Memo looks for Zulema to clarify everything she told Daniela and confirms that another man was the one who tormented Olivia. Daniela takes Ursula to the hospital for a sudden discomfort with her pregnancy and after confirming that everything is fine, Úrsula confides that Daniela will never take Memo away from her.
64	"Tu marido tiene otra mujer"	2 February 2023	3.5
After Macario's comments, Chema complains to Amparo because he does not want to see her with another man, especially not with Eugenio. Daniela confesses to Karen that she is ready to rebuild her life with her husband, but Karen cannot stand the news and reveals that Fausto is cheating on her with another woman.
65	"Merece justicia"	3 February 2023	N/A
Memo tells Daniela and Fausto about the man who hurt Olivia, but in the midst of the memories, Daniela thinks she knows more clues. Fausto, trying to evade questioning, gives himself away.
66	"Los muertos no hablan"	6 February 2023	N/A
Memo arrives at the prison to talk to Zulema and follow up on the clues that will lead him to the culprit of Olivia's pain, but discovers that she died. Aarón argues with his sister outside the office, but Karen overhears this and confronts him about what he is hiding from her.
67	"¡Ya nació mi hijo!"	7 February 2023	3.6
While Daniela visits Memo to talk about Isabella, Úrsula's water breaks, but she begins to hallucinate about César's presence, which worries Memo, she then imagines Memo in Daniela's arms. Karen's plans go as planned when Daniela discovers that Fausto has lipstick on his shirt and confronts him.
68	"¡Ese niño no es mío!"	8 February 2023	4.1
In the middle of dinner with her family and friends, Karen confesses that she wants to become a mother, leaving Fausto surprised. Úrsula wants to see her son after giving birth, but when she holds him in her arms, she rejects him because she thinks he has been changed and starts to go crazy. Fausto is jealous of Karen's decision to have a child with Aarón and proposes to be the child's father. Úrsula reveals to Memo that César is not her cousin and that he wanted to take her son away from her.
69	"¡Yo no estoy loca!"	9 February 2023	3.8
Memo tells Macario everything that Úrsula has said in the midst of her mental breakdown. Macario looks for Úrsula and slaps her for jeopardizing his plans, Memo discovers this and looks for Macario to put a stop to him. Úrsula manages to calm down and finally meets her son, but she is sure that he is not her baby and wants to get rid of him. Macario convinces Amparo to give him half of her land in exchange for revealing Úrsula's secret.
70	"El matrimonio es legítimo"	10 February 2023	3.5
Eugenio confirms to Amparo that Úrsula and César were married; Memo overhears them. Karen asks Daniela to trust her because together they will unmask Fausto and his lover.
71	"¡No quiero vivir!"	13 February 2023	4.0
Amparo tells Úrsula that Memo knows the whole truth about her past, Úrsula cannot control her impulses and tries to run away with Martín. Sebastián enters Isabella's room and finds Karen kissing Fausto. Memo arrives at the hospital and confronts Úrsula for having lied to him about her relationship with César.
72	"La verdad siempre sale a la luz"	14 February 2023	3.9
Despite refusing, Úrsula is sent to a mental hospital. Sebastián follows Karen around and discovers her in Fausto's arms, confirming their affair. Despite Úrsula's lies, Memo accepts Martín as his son. Memo confesses to Daniela that Karen is Fausto's lover.
73	"Está usted detenida"	15 February 2023	4.0
After several obstacles in their relationship, Daniela and Memo make love. Aarón delivers to Daniela the lawsuit that Fausto filed against her for taking Isabella from her home. Karen confirms that she is pregnant and seeks legal advice to contest the Beltrán's will and keep the inheritance. Daniela arrives home and confirms Fausto's affair with Karen and overhears that Karen is pregnant.
74	"Nuestro matrimonio fue una cárcel"	16 February 2023	4.3
Daniela confronts Karen and Fausto for their affair, at first they deny it, but later they confess everything. Karen reveals to Daniela that she caused her to miscarriage her babies and in the middle of the argument, Karen throws Daniela down the stairs. Karen flees so as not to be linked to the crime against Daniela, Aarón promises to kill her so that they can continue with their plans together. Fausto enters Daniela's room, but when he tries to kill her, she wakes up.
75	"No te des por vencida"	17 February 2023	N/A
Due to the stress she is under, Karen suffers a miscarriage. Eugenio and Amparo spend a romantic moment together and make love. Memo visits Daniela in the hospital and begs her to fight for her life; she comes out of her coma.
76	"No me acuerdo de nada"	20 February 2023	4.1
Daniela wakes up from her coma, but does not remember anything from the past year, including Memo. Daniela returns home from hospital and surprises everyone by kissing Fausto.
77	"Ayúdame a recuperar mi vida"	21 February 2023	4.0
Memo visits Úrsula in the hospital and in a moment of lucidity, Úrsula confesses what happened with César and the reasons for keeping their marriage a secret. Fausto tells Karen that he prefers to keep his relationship with Daniela because with her memory loss he can manipulate her as he wishes. Daniela visits Memo to clarify what has happened with Olivia and is willing to learn the truth. Fausto prevents Macario from selling the land to someone else by showing him the promissory notes he signed.
78	"¿Por qué me enamoré de ti?"	22 February 2023	3.8
Fausto lies to Daniela about the reasons for their separation and assures her that she was another victim of Memo. Fausto visits Úrsula to ask her to erase the audio in which he accepts that he had ordered for Memo to be killed, Úrsula offers him a deal to get her out of the psychiatric ward.
79	"¿Dónde está Martín?"	23 February 2023	4.0
Macario enters the Santos' house to steal Martín and takes him to Yolanda's house. Aarón fears that his sister's life is in danger and threatens Karen with revealing that she tried to kill Daniela. Úrsula argues with Amparo about her son and they discover that he is not in his crib. Daniela and Memo arrive where Sandra is, but the latter refuses to talk because of Aarón's threats.
80	"Mil veces me volvería a enamorar de ti"	24 February 2023	3.9
Úrsula finds Macario's whereabouts and shoots him for having caused her to be sent to the psychiatric clinic. In the middle of a dinner with Memo and after a kiss, Daniela begins to remember what they had together. Fausto takes Isabella away from everything. Amparo and Úrsula arrive at Yolanda's house to find Martín, but Grace's presence surprises Amparo. Yolanda reveals the relationship she has had with Macario for years and of which Grace is a product.
81	"Muerto el perro se acabó la rabia"	27 February 2023	3.9
Aarón finds Fausto at his house and after an argument, Fausto murders him for betraying him. Memo receives a letter from Aarón in which he tells the truth about what Fausto did with Isabella. Úrsula finds Memo and Daniela kissing, but far from being furious, she accepts their relationship.
82	"Se te acabó el camino"	28 February 2023	3.9
Ursula damages Daniela's car to cause an accident and thus separate her from Memo permanently. Sebastián confesses to Eugenio that Karen and Fausto are lovers. Eugenio informs Daniela that after her divorce from Fausto, she could be in charge of Rogelio Beltrán's fortune. Gaby finds out that Grace is her half-sister and cannot stand her father's lie. In the midst of her crisis, Gaby drives Daniela's car and suffers an accident along with JuanPa and Sebastián.
83	"¡Mi pierna!"	1 March 2023	4.0
Daniela warns Fausto that if Isabella does not return to her, she will never give him the inheritance that belongs to him. Gaby, JuanPa and Sebastián are rescued from their accident. Sebastián is declared dead, but Memo insists until he shows vital signs again. JuanPa wakes up in the hospital and discovers that he is missing a leg. Karen accuses Gaby of being a murderer and asks that she be taken to jail. Despite opposition, Gaby is handcuffed by the police.
84	"Acabas de cavar tu tumba"	2 March 2023	4.0
Gaby receives a visit from Amparo in jail. Memo finds Fausto outside the restaurant and overhears his plans for the place and lashes out at him, not imagining that Isabella is there as well. JuanPa blames Gaby for what is happening to him, but recognizes that he still loves her. Úrsula takes advantage of Nélida's distraction to prepare Martín's bottle and put substances in it.
85	"Todo nos está saliendo mal"	3 March 2023	3.9
Eugenio finds Fausto in the hospital and complains about his relationship with Karen, Fausto tells him that he and Karen plan to give him a grandchild. Eugenio has to think about disconnecting Sebastián and although he refuses, he also receives advice to donate his organs and other lives. JuanPa asks Eugenio not to do anything to get Gaby out of prison. After Macario's advice, Yolanda calls Daniela and assures her that she will be able to see Isabella again in exchange for a large sum of money.
86	"Quiero que seamos una familia feliz"	6 March 2023	3.9
Macario asks Daniela for a large sum of money in exchange for Isabella's return. Daniela explains to Isabella the reason why she is no longer with Fausto and that her relationship with Memo made her move on. Fausto finds Macario to make him sign the truck stop property to him, but Macario asks for a chance. Fausto puts Macario to the test by demanding that he kill Yolanda; Macario shoots at Yolanda but the gun has no bullets.
87	"¡Soy una mujer libre!"	7 March 2023	4.0
Daniela is officially divorced from Fausto. Macario returns to Yolanda's house, she threatens him because he tried to kill her. Amparo cedes her land to Fausto in order to pay for a good lawyer for Gaby. Karen receives the result of the audit and confirms that Fausto did dirty business in the construction company; later she receives a farewell video from Aarón in which he accuses Fausto of having killed her mother.
88	"Te amo hasta la muerte"	8 March 2023	3.9
Fausto accepts that he caused the helicopter accident in which his parents died, Karen assures him that she is not worried about that and is willing to marry him. Sandra finds Memo and is ready to tell the truth about Fausto, but she is interrupted by Úrsula. Fausto finds Sandra at Amparo's restaurant and intends to kill her, but Sandra escapes. After several months, JuanPa visits Gaby in prison, but only to emphasize to her that her sentence will be pronounced soon.
89	"¡Úrsula la va a pagar!"	9 March 2023	4.1
Karen shows up at Daniela's house and reveals that she married Fausto. Daniela remembers that Karen ended her chances of becoming a mother and she slaps her. JuanPa receives his prosthetic leg but loses hope at the first attempt. Martín is in the hospital because of the substance that Úrsula gave him. With one day married, Fausto avoids Karen and sleeps with Úrsula.
90	"Ni la muerte nos podrá separar"	10 March 2023	4.0
JuanPa learns that the brakes on the car were cut and Úrsula could be the culprit. Fausto gets custody of Isabella and reveals to her that he never loved her. JuanPa goes to the prison to apologize to Gaby. Úrsula takes Memo hostage and sets fire to the cabin so they can die together.
91	"Yo nunca pude ser feliz"	12 March 2023	4.0
92	"El amor nunca termina"	12 March 2023	4.0
Memo manages to untie himself and escape from the cabin, but Úrsula is trapped and burns inside. Eugenio discovers that Karen is an accomplice to all of Fausto's crimes and tells her that he despises her. Daniela arrives at Karen's location to get Isabella back. Karen throws Daniela down the building but she is the one who ends up falling. Fausto is captured by the police. Daniela marries Memo and they promise to take care of their relationship and be happy forever.

== Reception ==
=== Ratings ===
Viewership and ratings per season of Mi camino es amarte
Season	Timeslot (CT)	Episodes	First aired		Last aired		Avg. viewers (millions)
Season	Timeslot (CT)	Episodes	Date	Viewers (millions)	Date	Viewers (millions)	Avg. viewers (millions)
1	Mon–Fri 8:30 p.m.	88	7 November 2022	3.2	12 March 2023	4.0	3.53

=== Awards and nominations ===
Year	Award	Category	Nominated	Result	Ref
2023	Premios Juventud	My Favorite Actor	Gabriel Soto	Won	
2023	Premios Juventud	My Favorite Actress	Susana González	Nominated	
2023	Produ Awards	Best Telenovela	Mi camino es amarte	Nominated	
2023	Produ Awards	Best Fiction Producer - Superseries or Telenovela	Nicandro Díaz González	Nominated	
