= El Amor no Tiene Precio =

Mexican telenovela

- Genre: Telenovela; Romance; Drama
- Created by: Caridad Bravo Adams; Inés Rodena
- Written by: María Antonieta "Calú" Gutiérrez; Alberto Gómez
- Starring: Susana González; Victor Noriega; Eugenia Cauduro; Victor González; Yul Bürkle
- Opening theme: "El amor no tiene precio" by Iván Rossi
- Country of origin: United States
- Original language: Spanish
- No. of episodes: 280

Production
- Executive producer: Alfredo Schwarz
- Producers: Gemma Lombardi Ortín; Salvador Mejía
- Production locations: Televisa San Ángel; Mexico City, Mexico; Miami, United States
- Camera setup: Multi-camera
- Running time: 42-45 minutes
- Production companies: Televisa; Univision

Original release
- Network: Canal de las Estrellas
- Release: September 26, 2005 – October 14, 2006

Related
- Regina Carbonell; Pobre señorita Limantour

El amor no tiene precio (English title: Priceless Love) is a Mexican telenovela produced by Alfredo Schwarz for Televisa and Univision in co-production with Fonovideo. It premiered on September 26, 2005 and ended on October 10, 2006.

Susana González and Víctor Noriega starred as protagonists, while Eugenia Cauduro, Alba Roversi, Susana Dosamantes, Víctor González and Gabriela Vergara starred as antagonists.

== Plot ==
Maria Liz lives in a poor neighborhood in Mexico City with her English grandfather, Henry Alexander. Mr. Alexander was once rich, but lost his fortune in a stock market crash. This, combined with the loss of his wife, sent him into a mental decline. With effort and determination, Maria Liz managed to finish her studies and became a nurse, although she does not live her dream to study medicine.

Maria Liz also helps her boyfriend, Marcelo, who studies engineering. But, Marcelo is an egotistical man who only thinks about finishing his career and leaving the neighborhood as soon as he obtains a good job, forgetting the sacrifices that his parents and Maria Liz have made.

In an elegant district of the city, Sebastián lives with his mother, Doña Lucrecia. Sebastián is a civil engineer and a working man. He detests the false world in which his mother lives due to the fortune that she inherited from her husband for her political family.

Marcelo finds a job as a construction worker at the construction site where Sebastián works and immediately forgets his promise of marriage to Maria Liz. He begins to try to take away everything Sebastián has, including Sebastián's position at the construction company and his girlfriend, Araceli, who is the daughter of the owner of the construction company.

When the child of a construction worker is injured at the work site, Sebastián takes him to the hospital where Maria Liz works. Although their first encounter is conflicting, Sebastián realizes that she is a very good nurse and soon helps her so that she takes care of his mother.

But Doña Lucrecia begins to make his life a living hell when she finds out that Sebastián has fallen in love with Maria Liz, and she loves him back. Doña Lucrecia wants the economic security and the social level that Maria Liz obtains that the selfish and superficial Araceli could give him, thus she is allied with a fellow nurse of María Liz, Rosalía, who always hated María Liz because Dr. Arnaldo Herrera is in love with her when Rosalía loved him.

In spite of the obstacles that Araceli, Lucrecia and Rosalía put to them to test their love, but they do not manage to separate them. They decide to get married and problems begin when the villainous Luciano sets a trap for Miguel Augusto that leads him to commit suicide.

Sebastián and María Liz are set be married, but because of an emergency, Sebastián is late to the wedding, and María Liz thinks he has changed his mind and has decided to marry Araceli instead. A doctor, who is treating Marcelo to help get him ready for the leg operation he needs, falls madly in love with María Liz and is insanely jealous of Sebastián, More so when he discovers that she has gotten pregnant by Sebastián. Araceli is also pregnant by Sebastián, having gotten him drunk to serve her purposes, but her careless lifestyle and excessive drinking cause her to miscarry.

Realizing that a child is the only thing that would keep Sebastian from walking out on her (he's just learned of Maria Liz's pregnancy), she enlists the help of Lucrecia and Rosalía. They kidnap Maria Liz and take her to a clinic where a C-Section is performed on her, and the child is taken from her womb.

Rosalia then removes Araceli's name from her medical report and replaces it with Maria Liz's, making it appear that Maria Liz is the negligent one, not Araceli. Maria Liz protests her innocence, but Sebastian refuses to believe her, and declares that he never wants to see her again.

Heartbroken, she leaves to study medicine in London, returning several years later a full-fledged doctor. In the meantime, however, Sebastian realizes the truth about Araceli, and that Maria Liz was telling the truth all along.

He divorces Araceli, but she gets custody of the 2 children, Vanessa and Liliana. She marries Marcelo soon after, but it is a loveless marriage, and Vanessa & Liliana are physically and mentally abused by both of them.

== Cast ==
- Susana González as María Liz Limantour González/María Elizabeth González de Limantour
- Víctor Noriega as Sebastián Monte y Valle Cevallos
- Eugenia Cauduro as Araceli Montalbán Torreblanca
- Víctor González as Marcelo Carvajal Méndez
- Susana Dosamantes as Doña Lucrecia Torreblanca Vda. de Montalbán
- Gabriela Vergara as Ivana Santa Lucía Almonte Vda. de Montés/Alma Santa Lucía Almonte
- Roberto Vander as Germán Garcés
- Alma Delfina as Doña Flor Méndez de Carbajal
- Jorge Martínez as Miguel Augusto Montalbán/Abel Montalbán
- Julieta Rosen as Coralía de Herrera/Mrs. Alexander
- Alba Roversi as Rosalía
- Alejandro Ávila as Dr. Arnaldo Herrera
- Víctor Cámara as Nelson Cisneros
- Miguel Durand as Felipe Limantour/Arturo Limantour Garcés del Olmo
- Yul Bürkle as Mariano Luján
- Claudia Reyes as Yolanda
- Ismael La Rosa as Juan Carlos Carvajal
- Maritza Bustamante as Federica "Kika" Méndez
- Raúl Xiquez as Luciano Robles del Campo
- Oswaldo Calvo as Mr. Henry Alexander
- Mike Biaggio as Camilo Marín
- Alan as Víctor Manuel Prado
- Juan Carlos Gutiérrez as Oscar Robles
- Maite Embil as Clara
- Geraldine Bazan as Elizabeth Monte y Valle González
- Altair Jarabo as Vanessa Monte y Valle González
- Carlos Yustis as Nicolás
- Eduardo Ibarrola as Joaquín
- Tania López as Rayo Arul
- Martha Acuña as Rebeca
- Antonio M. Suarez as José Carvajal
- Anabel Leal as Clementina Méndez de Carvajal
- Pablo Cheng as Farolito
- Angie Russian as Cristina
- Mario Liberti as Pedro León
- Frank Carreño as Jaime
- Gladys Cáceres as Hermosura
- Ivonne D'Liz as Severa del Campo
- Sabrina Olmedo as Keyla
- Nicole García as Child Vanessa "Vanessita" Monte y Valle González
- Julieta García as Ligia Elena
- Tobias Yrys as Gilberto
- Camilo Sáenz as Puma
- Ronny Montemayor as Andres
- Juan Manuel Jáuregui as Cobra
- Alejandra Lazcano as Liliana Monte y Valle
- Katie Barberi as Engracia Alexander "La Chacala"
- Thaily Amezcua as Irene
- Michelle Jones as Jackie
- Julio Ocampo as Rubén
- Enrique Rodríguez as Mario
- Rudy Pavón as Lawyer
- Frank Zapata as Police officer

== See also ==
- List of films and television shows set in Miami
