= Amores verdaderos =

Mexican telenovela

- Also known as: True Love
- Genre: Telenovela
- Based on: Amor en custodia by Marcela Citterio
- Written by: Kary Fajer; Julián Aguilar; Alberto Gómez; Gerardo Luna; Ximena Suárez; Rosario Velicia; Alejandro Orive
- Screenplay by: Kary Fajer
- Story by: Enrique Estevanez; Marcela Citterio
- Directed by: Salvador Garcini; Ricardo de la Parra
- Starring: Erika Buenfil; Eduardo Yáñez; Eiza González; Sebastián Rulli
- Theme music composer: Alejandro Sanz
- Opening theme: "No me compares" by Alejandro Sanz
- Ending theme: "Me puedes pedir lo que sea" by Eiza Gonzalez featuring Marconi
- Country of origin: Mexico
- Original language: Spanish
- No. of seasons: 1
- No. of episodes: 181 (list of episodes)

Production
- Executive producer: Nicandro Díaz González
- Producer: J. Antonio Arvizú
- Production locations: Filming; Televisa San Ángel Mexico City, Mexico; Locations; New York City; Miami, Florida
- Cinematography: Alejandro Frutos Maza; Gabriel Vázquez Bulman
- Editors: Ioma Carmona; Mauricio Coronel; Pablo Peralta; Susana Valencia
- Camera setup: Multi-camera
- Production company: Televisa

Original release
- Network: Canal de las Estrellas
- Release: September 3, 2012 – May 12, 2013

Related
- Amor en custodia (2005); Amor en custodia (2009); Guardián de mi vida (2026)

Amores verdaderos (English: True Love) is a Mexican telenovela produced by Nicandro Díaz González for Televisa. It is based on the 2005 Argentine telenovela Amor en custodia, created by Marcela Citterio. It stars an ensemble cast led by Erika Buenfil, Eduardo Yáñez, Eiza González and Sebastián Rulli. The telenovela aired on Canal de las Estrellas from 3 September 2012 to 12 May 2013. In the United States, it aired on Univision from 7 November 2012 to 28 July 2013.

== Plot ==
The story begins when Victoria Balvanera, the owner of a huge mansion and a prestigious advertising agency, suffers an attempted kidnapping on the family farm; José Ángel Arriaga, who comes to request the position of foreman for him, saves her from the criminals. After this altercation, Victoria decides to hire Arriaga as her personal bodyguard, and the times they spend together will cause a true love to emerge between them, but their love is impossible as they are both married respectively.

Victoria is the wife of Nelson Brizz, who married her only for her interest. Their daughter, Nikki, is a capricious and haughty young woman who keeps her serious problem of bulimia and anorexia a secret. Nikki adores her parents and her grandfather Aníbal Balvanera, a regal, domineering and shrewd man who manipulates the lives of her daughters Victoria and Adriana. When Victoria discovers that Nelson has an affair with supermodel Kendra Ferreti and she is going to have a child with him, Victoria demands for a divorce but Nelson refuses to leave; on the other hand, Arriaga suffers the loss of his wife Cristina Corona, who died in an accident shortly after learning that she was Aníbal's daughter and a result of the relationship that her mother had with him many years ago.

Arriaga's daughter Liliana mourns the loss of her supposed mother without knowing that her real mother is Adriana. When Liliana begins working as a gardener at the Balvanera mansion, she endures Nikki's constant rudeness and mistreatment, as Nikki insists on emphasizing their social differences. However, their dynamic shifts when Liliana discovers that she is also a Balvanera, giving her the strength to compete with Nikki for the love of Francisco Guzmán, Nikki's personal bodyguard. Despite Nikki's initial attempts to make Guzmán's life miserable, she ultimately and unexpectedly falls madly in love with him. As a result of a series of misunderstandings, Nikki is forced into a loveless marriage with tennis player Roy Pavía while thinking that Guzmán loves Liliana. Roy accepted the marriage following the instructions of his mother since they see in Nikki the chance to escape bankruptcy. This marriage turned out to be a complete hell for both Nikki and Roy. Guzmán is forced to marry Liliana after a tragic event that left her in agony, and Nikki is deeply affected by this situation as when she meets Guzmán again after her separation from Roy, they both realize they still love each other.

Victoria, Arriaga, Nikki and Guzmán will have to overcome the obstacles of destiny as the only solution is to unite them together and achieve their true love.

== Cast ==
=== Main ===
- Erika Buenfil as Victoria Balvanera Gil de Brizz
- Eduardo Yáñez as José Ángel Arriaga
- Eiza González as Nikki Brizz Balvanera
- Sebastián Rulli as Francisco Guzmán Trejo
- Enrique Rocha as Aníbal Balvanera
- Guillermo Capetillo as Nelsón Brizz
- Marjorie de Sousa as Kendra Ferreti / Macária Chávez
- Sherlyn as Liliana Arriaga Corona / Lucia Celorio Balvanera
- Francisco Gattorno as Santino Roca "Salsero"
- Mónika Sánchez as Cristina Balvanera Corona de Arriaga
- Susana González as Beatriz Guzmán Trejo de Solís
- Julio Camejo as Leonardo Solís
- Raquel Morell as Tomasina Lagos
- Silvia Manríquez as Paula Trejo
- Michelle Rodríguez as Polita López
- Ruben Branco as Jean Marie
- Lilia Aragón as Odette Longoria
- Archie Lafranco as Estefano Longoria
- Arsenio Campos as Felipe Guzmán
- Sergio Acosta as Espanto
- Hugo Macías Macotela as Fortuno
- María Prado as Jovita
- Natalia Esperón as Adriana Balvanera Gil
- Ana Martín as Candelaria Corona
- Diana Golden as Gilda Leyva
- Gabriela Goldsmith as Doris Orol de Pavía
- Eleazar Gómez as Roy Pavía Orol
- Lisardo as Carlos González / Joan Constantín

=== Recurring and guest stars ===
- Marcelo Córdoba as Vicente Celorio
- Ana Bárbara as herself
- Elsa Cárdenas as judge
- Lolita Ayala as herself
- Adrián Escalona as Guillermo "Guillo" Solís Guzmán
- Bárbara Islas as Nabila
- Luis Xavier as Milton Pavía
- Paulina de Labra as Opalina
- Toño Infante as Comandante
- Patricia Conde as Profesora Astudillo
- Diego de Erice as Vladimir
- Patsy as Jocelyn Alcázar
- Juan Verduzco as Doctor Montaño
- Ricardo Barona as El Turco
- Irina Areu as Elsa
- Teo Tapia as Antonio del Conde
- Renata Flores as Imperia Roca
- Sabine Moussier as Bruna Cristo
- Pedro Weber "Chatanuga" as Mezcalitos

== Production ==
The complete cast was announced on June 22, 2012. Filming of the telenovela began on July 23, 2012, and concluded on April 30, 2013. It was the first telenovela to have a 3-hour series finale presentation with commercials.

== Episodes ==
Season	Episodes	Originally released	
Season	Episodes	First released	Last released
1	181	September 3, 2012	May 12, 2013
Special		May 12, 2013	

== Reception ==
=== Mexican broadcast ===
On September 3, 2012, Canal de las Estrellas started broadcasting Amores verdaderos weeknights at 9:30pm, replacing Abismo de pasión. The last episode was broadcast on May 12, 2013, with La tempestad replacing it the following day.

Viewership and ratings per season of Amores verdaderos
Season	Timeslot (CT)	Episodes	First aired		Last aired		Avg. viewers (millions)
Season	Timeslot (CT)	Episodes	Date	Viewers (millions)	Date	Viewers (millions)	Avg. viewers (millions)
1	Mon–Fri 9:15 p.m.	181	September 3, 2012	26.7	May 12, 2013	27.9	24.1

=== U.S. broadcast ===
Univision confirmed a prime-time broadcast of Amores verdaderos on October 10, 2012. On November 7, Univision started broadcasting Amores verdaderos weeknights at 9pm/8c, replacing Abismo de pasión averaged 4.3 million viewers. The last episode was broadcast on July 28, 2013 at 8pm/7c, with La tempestad replacing it the following day, averaged 5.3 million viewers.

Viewership and ratings per season of Amores verdaderos
Season	Timeslot (ET)	Episodes	First aired		Last aired		Avg. viewers (millions)
Season	Timeslot (ET)	Episodes	Date	Viewers (millions)	Date	Viewers (millions)	Avg. viewers (millions)
1	Mon–Fri 9:00 p.m.	181	November 7, 2012	5.5	July 28, 2013	7.6	4.3

== Soundtrack ==
Track	Song	Singer(s)	Running time	References
1	"Ahora Tú"	Malú	3:51	
2	"El Amor No Es Perfecto"	Suzet Villalobos	3:35	
3	"Me Puedes Pedir Lo Que Sea"	Eiza y Marconi	3:55	
4	"No Me Compares"	Alejandro Sanz	4:46	
5	"De Punta a Punta"	José Luis Rodríguez	3:56	
6	"Loco Por Ti"	Lisardo	4:10	

== Awards and nominations ==
Year	Award	Category	Nominated	Result
2013	Premios Juventud	What a Hottie!	Sebastián Rulli	Won
2013	Premios Juventud	Girl of my Dreams	Eiza González	Nominated
2013	Premios Juventud	Best Theme Novelero	"Me Puedes Pedir Lo Que Sea"	Won
2013	Premios People en Español	Best Telenovela	Nicandro Díaz Gonzalez	Nominated
2013	Premios People en Español	Best Actress	Eiza González	Nominated
2013	Premios People en Español	Best Actress	Erika Buenfil	Nominated
2013	Premios People en Español	Best Actor	Eduardo Yáñez	Nominated
2013	Premios People en Español	Best Actor	Sebastián Rulli	Nominated
2013	Premios People en Español	Best Supporting Actress	Sherlyn	Nominated
2013	Premios People en Español	Best Female Antagonist	Marjorie de Sousa	Nominated
2013	Premios People en Español	Couple of the Year	Eiza González and Sebastián Rulli	Nominated
2014	TVyNovelas Awards	Best Telenovela of the Year	Nicandro Díaz Gonzalez	Won
2014	TVyNovelas Awards	Best Lead Actress	Erika Buenfil	Won
2014	TVyNovelas Awards	Best Lead Actor	Sebastián Rulli	Nominated
2014	TVyNovelas Awards	Best Female Antagonist	Marjorie de Sousa	Won
2014	TVyNovelas Awards	Best Young Lead Actress	Sherlyn	Won
2014	TVyNovelas Awards	Best Young Lead Actor	Eleazar Gómez	Nominated
2014	TVyNovelas Awards	Best Co-star Actress	Natalia Esperón	Nominated
2014	TVyNovelas Awards	Best First Actress	Ana Martin	Won
2014	TVyNovelas Awards	Best Supporting Actress	Susana González	Won
2014	TVyNovelas Awards	Best Musical Theme	"No Me Compares" by Alejandro Sanz	Won
2014	TVyNovelas Awards	Best Original Story or Adaptation	Nicandro Díaz Gonzalez	Won
2014	TVyNovelas Awards	Best Direction	Salvador Garcini & Alejandro de la Parra	Nominated
2014	TVyNovelas Awards	Telenovela Multiplataforma	Amores Verdaderos	Won
2014	Los favoritos del público			
2014	Los favoritos del público	The Most Beautiful Girl	Marjorie de Sousa	Nominated
2014	Los favoritos del público	The Most Handsome Guy	Sebastián Rulli	Nominated
2014	Los favoritos del público	Favorite Villain	Marjorie de Sousa	Won
2014	Los favoritos del público	Favorite Slap	Erika Buenfil to Marjorie de Sousa	Won
2014	Los favoritos del público	Favorite Couple	Eduardo Yáñez with Erika Buenfil	Won
2014	Los favoritos del público	Favorite Kiss	Eduardo Yáñez with Erika Buenfil	Nominated
2014	Los favoritos del público	Favorite Finale	Nicandro Díaz González	Won
2014	GLAAD Media Awards	Outstanding Novela		Won
