= Nicandro Díaz González =

Mexican telenovela producer (1963–2024)

- Born: Nicandro Díaz González; August 9, 1963; Monterrey, Nuevo León, Mexico
- Died: March 18, 2024 (aged 60); Cozumel, Quintana Roo, Mexico
- Occupation: Producer
- Years active: 1986–2024
- Parent(s): Nicandro Díaz Oropeza; Victoria González

Nicandro Díaz González (August 7, 1963 – March 18, 2024) was a Mexican telenovela producer.

== Career ==
=== 1986–1997: Early work ===
Díaz González began his professional career as production assistant in Valentín Pimstein's telenovelas: Monte Calvario and Rosa salvaje. These were followed by Mi segunda madre, Simplemente María, La pícara soñadora and Carrusel de las Américas, where he was production coordinator. In 1996, he becomes associate producer in Lucero Suárez's telenovela Para toda la vida. His work continues with Pedro Damián in Mi pequeña traviesa and Preciosa.

=== 1998–2023: Executive producer ===
Díaz González's career as executive producer began in 1998, with one of Televisa Niños' first telenovelas, Gotita de amor. In 1999 he followed with his first teen telenovela, Alma rebelde. With Carita de ángel (2000) and ¡Vivan los niños! (2002), remake of Carrusel, he became a well-known producer of telenovelas for children.

With Destilando amor, in 2007, Díaz González entered into the prime time slot. The telenovela achieved success and received the Best Telenovela award at the 26th TVyNovelas Awards. In 2008, following the success of Destilando amor, Díaz González produced Mañana es para siempre. He would continue producing telenovelas for the prime time slot in the early 2010s, among them: Soy tu dueña (2010) and Amores verdaderos (2012).

In 2017, Díaz González produced his first comedy telenovela titled El Bienamado. In 2018, he produced the teen comedy telenovela Hijas de la luna. In 2020, Díaz González produced the comedy telenovela La mexicana y el güero. In 2021, he produced Mi fortuna es amarte, followed by Mi camino es amarte in 2022. In 2023, Díaz González produced what would turn out to be his last telenovela, Golpe de suerte.

== Death ==
Díaz González died in Cozumel, Quintana Roo on March 18, 2024, at the age of 60. He was involved in a motorcycle accident at around 7:30 pm EST the previous day while trying to avoid an animal. The producer, who was traveling with his partner at the time of the accident, suffered a polyconcussion and was assisted by paramedics and transferred to the Hospital Médica San Miguel de Cozumel, where he died of hypovolemic shock due to splenic trauma caused by a ruptured spleen.

== Filmography ==
Year	Title	Role
1986	Monte Calvario	Production assistant
1987-88	Rosa Salvaje	Production manager / Production assistant
1989	Mi segunda madre	Production manager
1989-90	Simplemente Maria	Production manager
1991	La pícara soñadora	Production manager
1992	Carrusel de las Américas	Production manager
1996	Para toda la vida	Associate producer
1997–1998	Mi pequeña traviesa	Associate producer
1998	Preciosa	Associate producer
1998	Gotita de amor	Executive producer
1999	Alma rebelde	Executive producer
2000–2001	Carita de Ángel	Executive producer
2002–2003	¡Vivan los niños!	Executive producer
2004	Corazones al límite	Executive producer
2005	Contra viento y marea	Executive producer
2007	Destilando Amor	Executive producer
2008–2009	Mañana es para siempre	Executive producer
2010	Soy tu dueña	Executive producer
2012–2013	Amores Verdaderos	Executive producer
2014–2015	Hasta el fin del mundo	Executive producer
2017	El Bienamado	Executive producer
2018	Hijas de la luna	Executive producer
2020–2021	La mexicana y el güero	Executive producer
2021–2022	Mi fortuna es amarte	Executive producer
2022-2023	Mi camino es amarte	Executive producer
2023-2024	Golpe de suerte	Executive producer

== Awards and nominations ==
=== Premios TVyNovelas ===
Year	Category	Telenovela	Result
2008	Best Telenovela of the Year	Destilando Amor	Won
2010	Best Telenovela of the Year	Mañana es para siempre	Nominated
2011	Best Telenovela of the Year	Soy tu dueña	Nominated
2014	Best Telenovela of the Year	Amores Verdaderos	Won

=== Premios People en Español ===
Year	Category	Telenovela	Result
2009	Best Telenovela	Mañana es para siempre	Won
2009	Best Remake	Mañana es para siempre	Won
