= Las Juanas =

Las Juanas may refer to:

- Las Juanas (Colombian TV series), 1997
- Las Juanas (Mexican TV series), 2004
