= Las amazonas (Mexican TV series) =

Mexican telenovela

- Genre: Telenovela
- Created by: Ricardo Fiallega
- Based on: Las amazonas by César Miguel Rondón
- Written by: Katia Rodríguez; Enna Márquez; Guenia Argomedo; Victoria Orvañanos
- Directed by: Alberto Díaz; José Dossetti
- Starring: Victoria Ruffo; Danna García; César Évora; Grettell Valdez; René Casados; Natalia Guerrero; Mariluz Bermúdez; Guillermo García Cantú; Andrés Palacios
- Opening theme: "Entrégate" by Carlos Marín and Innocence
- Country of origin: Mexico
- Original language: Spanish
- No. of episodes: 61

Production
- Executive producer: Salvador Mejía Alejandre
- Camera setup: Multi-camera
- Production company: Televisa

Original release
- Network: Canal de las Estrellas
- Release: May 16 – August 7, 2016

Related
- Niña amada mía; Las bandidas; Las amazonas (1985)

Las amazonas, is a Mexican telenovela produced by Salvador Mejía Alejandre for Televisa. It is an original story based on some arguments of the Venezuelan telenovela of 1985, Las Amazonas created by César Miguel Rondón. The series originally aired from May 16 to August 7, 2016.

The series is starring Victoria Ruffo as Inés, Danna García as Diana, César Évora as Victoriano, Grettell Valdez as Casandra, René Casados as Eduardo, Natalia Guerrero as Lisete, Mariluz Bermúdez as Constanza, Guillermo García Cantú as Loreto and Andrés Palacios as Alejandro.

== Plot ==
Tells the story of Victoriano, a landowner and businessman, father of three daughters (Diana, Casandra and Constanza), victims of lies and heartaches which prevents, him from being with the love of his life. She has also sacrificed her happiness, as she becomes the victim of an act of violence condemning her to live the shadows the Santos family.

The daughters of Victoriano each struggle in their own way, to find their respective happiness falling in love with three different types of men, not liked by their. This brings conflict into the Santos family. Diana, the eldest daughter is the one who comes to resemble her father. Casandra is sensible and independent, determined to make her way alone; Constanza is the younger, rebellious daughter who is eager to live her life to the fullest. The rest of the characters are composed of friends and foes of the Santos family, one of whom harbors a secret and resentment and when it is revealed, it will shake the entire family to the core.

== Related ==
This is the second attempt by Televisa in producing this series. The 2003 version began production strangely enough without originally being called "Las Amazonas". Midway through production, executives decided to change the title. This created all sorts of confusion as not even the actors back knew the name of the product. Matters were not helped as the script called for the character of Victoriano to affectionately call his daughters Amazons, due to their ability to ride thoroughbred horses in the ranch. The soap opera finally come up with a name: "Niña Amada Mía" ("My beloved girl") as the production wanted to vertically integrate popular songs making he public identify the song with their drama. The theme song was sung by Mexican superstar Alejandro Fernandez.

== Cast ==
=== Main ===
- Victoria Ruffo as Inés Huerta de Santos
- Danna García as Diana Santos Luna
- César Évora as Victoriano Santos
- Grettell Valdez as Casandra Santos Luna
- René Casados as Eduardo Mendoza Castro
- Natalia Guerrero as Lisete Ruiz
- Mariluz Bermúdez as Constanza Santos Luna
- Guillermo García Cantú as Loreto Guzmán Váldez
- Andrés Palacios as Alejandro San Román

=== Recurring ===
- Jacqueline Andere as Bernarda Castro vda. de Mendoza
- Liz Gallardo as Monserrat
- Gabriela Vergara as Déborah Piñeiro de Santos/Eugenia Villarroel
- Juan Pablo Gil as Emiliano Guzmán Huerta
- Eduardo Liñán as Genaro Villa
- Alejandro Ruiz as Alonso
- Alex Sirvent as Fabrizio Allende
- Héctor Cruz as Ing Bermúdez
- Boris Duflos as Robby Arrieta Mejía
- Fernando Robles as Artemio
- Marcia Coutiño as Delia
- Alejandro Estrada as Elías Villaroel
- Rafael del Villar as Roberto
- Benjamín Rivero as Melitón Meléndez
- Marielena Zamora as Jacinta Ruiz
- Palmeira Cruz as Candela
- Rosita Pelayo as Lucha
- Marco Montero
- Flora Fernández as Amicela
- Carla Stefan as Elvia
- Miranda Kay as María José San Román Ruiz
- Sarahí Meza as Belen
- Valentina de los Cobos as Sabina San Román Ruiz
- Landon Jay as Iván Villarroel

=== Special guest ===
- Alfredo Adame as Vicente Mendoza Castro
- Mónica Ayos as Diana Maria Luna de Santos / Diana Elisa

== Awards and nominations ==
Year	Award	Category	Nominated	Result
2017	35th TVyNovelas Awards	Best Actor	Andrés Palacios	Nominated
2017	35th TVyNovelas Awards	Best Leading Actor	César Évora	Won
2017	35th TVyNovelas Awards	Best Co-lead Actress	Grettell Valdez	Nominated
2017	35th TVyNovelas Awards	Best Young Lead Actress	Mariluz Bermúdez	Nominated
2017	35th TVyNovelas Awards	Best Young Lead Actor	Juan Pablo Gil	Nominated
2017	35th TVyNovelas Awards	Best Cast	Las amazonas	Nominated
