= Cuento de brujas =

Cuento de brujas or Un cuento de brujas may refer to:

- Cuento de brujas, a 1954 three-act comedy directed by Alfredo Pereña Pamiés
- Cuento de brujas, an episode of the fourth season of El Chapulín Colorado
- Un cuento de brujas, an episode of the 2004 Colombian television series La septima puerta
- Un cuento de brujas, an episode of the 2006 Colombian anthology television series Tu voz estéreo
- Cuentos de la Bruja (English: Tales from the Witch or Witch Tales), a 2019 Peruvian comedy horror directed by Mike Lyddon

== See also ==
- Cuento de brujas
- Un cuento de brujas
