= Hijas de la luna =

2018 Mexican telenovela

- Genre: Telenovela
- Based on: Las Juanas by Bernardo Romero Pereiro
- Screenplay by: Alejandro Pohlenz; Palmira Olguín
- Story by: Juanita Samper; Bernardo Romero Pereiro
- Directed by: Ricardo de la Parra; Salvador Sánchez
- Creative director: Claudia Hale
- Starring: Michelle Renaud; Danilo Carrera; Jade Fraser; Geraldine Galván; Lore Graniewicz; Omar Fierro; Alexis Ayala; Mario Morán; Mariluz Bermúdez
- Theme music composer: Gerardo Alejandro López Soto; Eduardo Mercado Sánchez de Tagle; César Eugenio Cega Viqueras; Paolo Stefanoni Pinto
- Opening theme: "Tengo" by Timbiriche
- Ending theme: "Llévame" by Espinoza Paz
- Country of origin: Mexico
- Original language: Spanish
- No. of seasons: 1
- No. of episodes: 82

Production
- Executive producer: Nicandro Díaz González
- Cinematography: Rafael Hernández Benages; Alfredo Lorenzo
- Editors: Mauricio Coronel Cortez; Mauricio Cortés López
- Camera setup: Multi-camera
- Production company: Televisa

Original release
- Network: Las Estrellas
- Release: 19 February – 10 June 2018

Related
- Las Juanas (2004)

Hijas de la luna (English: Moon Daughters) is a Mexican telenovela that premiered on 19 February 2018 on Las Estrellas, and concluded on 10 June 2018. The telenovela is produced for Televisa by Nicandro Díaz González, based on the 1997 Colombian telenovela written by Bernardo Romero Pereiro and entitled Las Juanas. It stars Michelle Renaud and Danilo Carrera as main characters.

== Plot ==
The telenovela chronicles four sisters: Juana Victoria (Michelle Renaud), a young woman who works in an inn and lives in Mexico City; Juana Soledad (Jade Fraser), a young lady who is a nurse; Juana Bárbara (Lorena Graniewicz), a regiomontana who practices boxing; and Juana Inés (Geraldine Galván), a Puebla novice.

On her deathbed, Juana Victoria's mother, Rosaura, reveals to her that her real father is a man named Juan Oropeza (Omar Fierro), a hotelier from Mazatlan, Sinaloa. She goes to meet him and discovers that in addition to having a half-brother, Sebastián (Danilo Carrera), there is a possibility that she has three half sisters as well. Sebastián and Juana Victoria are given the task of finding them, and that is how a story begins full of romance, adventures, and unexpected encounters.

== Cast ==
=== Main ===
- Michelle Renaud as Juana Victoria Ramírez Nieto
- Danilo Carrera as Sebastián Oropeza
- Jade Fraser as Juana Soledad García
- Geraldine Galván as Juana Inés Bautista
- Lore Graniewicz as Juana Bárbara Treviño
- Omar Fierro as Juan Oropeza
- Alexis Ayala as Darío Iriarte
- Mario Morán as Mauricio Iriarte San Román
- Mariluz Bermúdez as Estefanía Iriarte San Román
- Eugenia Cauduro as Teresa
- Arcelia Ramírez as Margarita
- Marco Uriel as Xavier Oropeza
- Gonzalo Peña as Fernando Ruíz Melgarejo
- Jonathan Becerra as Octavio Sánchez
- Miguel Martínez as Todoelmundo
- Jorge Gallegos as Raymundo
- Jackie Sauza as Carla Vásquez
- Héctor Ortega as Padre Camilo
- José María Nieto as Mundito
- Bea Ranero as Adela
- Sergio Acosta as Ernesto Cifuentes
- Archie Lafranco as Jerome
- Cynthia Klitbo as Leonora Ruíz de Oropeza

=== Guest stars ===
- Francisco Gattorno as Alberto
- Isaura Espinoza as Madre Superiora
- Mari Carmen Vela as Maité
- Eduardo MacGregor
- Alejandra Barros as Rosaura
- Ricardo Franco as Genaro
- Espinoza Paz as Himself
- Mariana Juárez as Herself

== Ratings ==
Viewership and ratings per season of Hijas de la luna
Season	Episodes	First aired		Last aired		Avg. viewers (millions)
Season	Episodes	Date	Viewers (millions)	Date	Viewers (millions)	Avg. viewers (millions)
1	81	19 February 2018	3.2	10 June 2018	8.1	2.79

== Episodes ==
No.	Title	Original release date	Mexico viewers (millions)
1	"Victoria sale en busca de Juan Oropeza"	19 February 2018	3.2
Before dying, Rosaura reveals to Juana Victoria that her real father is Juan Oropeza, whom she met on a half moon night. Juana Victoria decides to find her real father in Mazatlan.
2	"Leonora se entera que Juan le fue infiel cuatro veces"	20 February 2018	3.2
Juana Victoria meets her father, Juan Oropeza, who later confesses to Leonora that he was unfaithful with four different women. Sebastian asks his half sister to keep the secret.
3	"Juana Victoria y Sebastián encuentran a Juana Soledad"	21 February 2018	3.0
Juan asks Sebastián and Juana Victoria to look for the other three women with whom he had to see, since he could have more children, they accept and begin the investigation in Guadalajara.
4	"Juana Soledad acepta conocer a su papá"	22 February 2018	3.6
Juana Victoria convinces Juana Soledad to go to Mazatlan to meet her dad. Leonora forbids Sebastián to get in touch with Juana Victoria and demands that he not see her again.
5	"Juan Oropeza encuentra sus cuatro hijas"	23 February 2018	3.3
In Puebla, Sebastián arrives in time to save the life of Juana Inés, who leaves the convent to meet her family. The fourth daughter of Juan is found in Monterrey and her name is Juana Bárbara.
6	"Juana Victoria se entera que Sebastián se va a casar"	26 February 2018	2.8
Darío claims to Juan to have betrayed Leonora and they arrive at the blows. Sebastián tells Juana Victoria that he is going to marry Estefanía. Leonora does not want to continue with Juan and asks for a divorce.
7	"Estefanía es puesta a prueba"	27 February 2018	2.9
Leonora initiates the divorce proceedings. Juana Bárbara, Juana Soledad, and Juana Inés put Estefanía to the test to find out if she is the right woman for Sebastián, but he is no longer sure of getting married.
8	"Juana Inés confiesa que está enamorada de Sebastián"	28 February 2018	2.7
Juana Inés confesses to Juana Soledad that she is in love with her brother. Juana Victoria and Sebastián have a new approach to being trapped in an elevator. Fernando meets Juana Victoria.
9	"Fernando se está enamorando de Juana Victoria"	1 March 2018	2.7
Juana Inés learns that her mother is dead, but receives the unconditional support of her sisters. Fernando was fascinated with Juana Victoria and is convinced that she is the woman who was waiting.
10	"Juana Victoria y Sebastián se declaran su amor"	2 March 2018	2.9
The party that the Juanas organized fails and Leonorá assures Juan that she will never be able to forgive him. Juana Victoria and Sebastián declare their love but prefer to live with a love of brothers.
11	"Juan quiere dar a sus hijas el apellido Oropeza"	5 March 2018	2.6
Juan wants to compensate his daughters, so he makes the decision to give them the Oropeza surname and include them in his will. Darío plans to please Leonora and has a plan to get rid of the Juanas.
12	"Las Juanas... ¿Son unas impostoras?"	6 March 2018	2.8
Darío manipulates a video to make the Juanas pass as scammers, Juan falls into the trap and thinks that he was cheated, so they could keep his money, Todoelmundo proves that the video is false.
13	"Fernando salva la vida de Juana Victoria"	7 March 2018	2.7
Mauricio confirms that Darío is behind the fake video. Estefanía suspects that Sebastián no longer loves her. Fernando confesses to Juana Victoria that he is in love with her and saves her from being lynched.
14	"Juana Victoria cree que no es hermana de Sebastián"	8 March 2018	2.6
Leonora tries to verify if the birthmarks of the Juanas are real, Juana Victoria discovers that Sebastián does not have the birthmark in the shape of a half moon and doubts that they are brothers.
15	"Las Juanas dejan al descubierto la mentira de Darío"	9 March 2018	2.9
Everyone helps the Juanas to show that Darío sent to alter the video in which he accused them of being interested only looking for the fortune of Juan Oropeza.
16	"Leonora cancela los trámites de divorcio"	12 March 2018	3.0
Out of jealousy, Leonora decides to cancel her divorce because she does not intend to leave the way free to Juana Bárbara's mother. Juana Victoria finds out the origin of Sebastián to show that they are not siblings.
17	"Un incendio consume el dispensario de las Juanas"	13 March 2018	2.9
Darío tries again to harm the Juanas and causes a fire in the newly opened dispensary. Sebastián is obsessed with the idea of not sharing the same blood as Juana Victoria.
18	"Juana Victoria y Sebastián comprueban que no son hermanos"	14 March 2018	2.9
To end the doubt, Sebastián decides to take a DNA test to find out if he is Juana Victoria's brother, upon receiving the results they check his suspicions.
19	"Sebastián renuncia al amor de Juana Victoria"	15 March 2018	2.8
Las Juanas manage to open their businesses. Sebastián asks Juana Victoria to keep secret that they are not siblings, because he will not allow them to judge Leonora for having been unfaithful to Juan.
20	"Juana Victoria acepta sacrificar su amor"	16 March 2018	2.5
Darío convinces Leonora that Juan is a millionaire. Juana Victoria promises to keep the secret for the sake of Juan, Sebastián and Estefanía continue their wedding plans and the Juanas will be their bridesmaids.
21	"Juana soledad acepta ser novia de Octavio"	19 March 2018	2.4
Juana Victoria decides to support Sebastián with his wedding. Although Estefanía is convinced that Sebastián no longer loves her, they celebrate her bachelorette party. Octavio declares his love to Juana Soledad.
22	"Juana Victoria decide alejarse definitivamente de Sebastián"	20 March 2018	3.0
Darío hits Juan, then proposes to make peace. The Juanas try to find out why Darío hates them. Juana Victoria and Sebastián say goodbye, so she prepares her return to the city.
23	"Estefanía cancela su boda con Sebastián"	21 March 2018	2.8
Sebastián's apologies are not enough for Estefanía, who decides to break her marriage commitment after confirming that he has stopped loving her. Sebastián prevents Juana Victoria from leaving.
24	"Juana Victoria y Sebastián deciden vivir su amor en secreto"	22 March 2018	2.7
Darío does not accept that Estefanía leaves Mazatlán and seeks revenge against Sebastián. Life has conspired to keep Juana Victoria and Sebastián together, they admit that they want to live their love.
25	"Juana Inés sospecha que Sebastián tiene una relación secreta"	23 March 2018	N/A
Ernesto Cifuentes blames himself for making life impossible for Juan and his daughters. Leonora is reunited with Jerome. Juana Inés discovers that Sebastián is in a secret relationship with a woman named Julieta.
26	"Leonora se reencuentra con el verdadero padre de Sebastián"	26 March 2018	2.5
Juana Inés discovers that Sebastián has another girlfriend. Jerome arrives in Mazatlan hoping to meet his son Sebastián, despite the promise he made to Leonora. The Media Luna is closed.
27	"Sebastián y Juana Victoria se entregan al amor"	27 March 2018	2.2
To continue his revenge, Darío ends with the prestige of Media Luna. Jerome meets Sebastián. Juana Victoria and Sebastián have a romantic evening where passion is unleashed.
28	"Juana Inés no puede controlar sus celos"	28 March 2018	2.3
Sebastián goes out of control after discovering that Juana Inés spies on him and shouts at her to leave him in peace, later discovers that she is in love. Juana Victoria and Sebastián plan a romantic evening.
29	"¿Juana Inés está enamorada de Mauricio?"	29 March 2018	2.0
Juana Victoria suspects that Juana Inés fell in love with Sebastián, when confronted, she lies saying that she loves Mauricio. Juana Victoria and Sebastián do not intend to continue hiding their love.
30	"Juana Victoria descubre el amor secreto de Juana Inés"	30 March 2018	2.3
After showing off in a bikini, Juana Inés must be hospitalized in an emergency, where she reveals to Juana Victoria that she fell in love with Sebastián. Leonora's plan to save the Media Luna fails.
31	"Juana Victoria termina su relación con Sebastián"	2 April 2018	2.6
After the confession of Juana Inés, Juana Victoria ends her secret relationship with Sebastián, since she does not want to continue lying. Juana Soledad has a devastating premonition, a hurricane is near.
32	"Juana Inés y Mauricio quedan atrapados en medio del huracán"	3 April 2018	2.6
The Hurricane Juana lashes Mazatlan, while Darío saves Leonora, Mauricio and Juana Inés are lost in the middle of the misfortune, leaving her life in grave danger.
33	"Mauricio arriesga su vida para salvar a Juana Inés"	4 April 2018	3.0
The hurricane destroys the Media Luna and Juana Inés is rescued by Mauricio, but due to the heavy blows she received, her health is delicate. Mauricio finds out that Juana Inés is in love with him.
34	"Leonora descubre que las Juanas viven en su casa"	5 April 2018	3.0
Juan discovers that he was the victim of a fraud and the Media Luna is not insured, so he will not be able to rebuild it and soon he will go to ruin. Leonora finds the Juanas living in her house.
35	"Estefanía no puede estar lejos de Sebastián y decide regresar"	6 April 2018	3.1
Leonora allows the Juanas to live in her house. Juana Bárbara discovers that she is falling in love with Mauricio. Estefanía can not continue with her life and decides to return for Sebastián.
36	"Juan se entera que Juana Soledad está embarazada"	9 April 2018	2.5
Sebastián finds out that Juana Inés is in love with him. Juana Bárbara decides to call Mauricio's attention. In the midst of so many tragedies, Juan thanks Juana Soledad for making him a grandfather.
37	"Darío contrata a Juana Victoria para cuidar a Estefanía"	10 April 2018	2.9
Juana Inés awakens from the coma, but suffers amnesia. Desperate, Darío offers money to Juan in exchange for convincing Sebastián to marry Estefanía. Juana Victoria agrees to take care of Estefanía.
38	"Espinoza Paz sorprende con su llegada a Mazatlán"	11 April 2018	3.3
Espinoza Paz will give a concert in Mazatlan, Octavio presumes to be his cousin, but is denied by the singer, who invites the Juanas to his concert. Juana Soledad discovers that her pregnancy is real.
39	"Darío presiona a Sebastián para que se case con Estefanía"	12 April 2018	3.0
Leonora puts a trap on Estefanía so that she returns with Sebastián. Darío tries to negotiate the happiness of his daughter, Sebastián rejects the proposal. Espinoza Paz helps rebuild La Dolorosa.
40	"Juana Inés recuerda que Mauricio le salvó la vida"	13 April 2018	2.8
Juana Inés remembers that Mauricio saved her from dying. Darío discovers that the owner of La Dolorosa is Mauricio and the Juanas go to work with him. Juana Soledad is not sure of marrying Octavio.
41	"Juana Inés y Mauricio ya son novios"	16 April 2018	2.7
Espinoza Paz reopens the Dolorosa. Juana Inés and Mauricio began a relationship, but he is arrested by the authorities. Juana Soledad agrees to marry Octavio and discovers that she is not pregnant.
42	"Estefanía decide reconquistar a Sebastián"	17 April 2018	2.8
Sebastián begins the search for his biological father. Estefanía intends to recover Sebastián's love and asks Juana Victoria to support her.
43	"Sebastián cree saber quién es su padre biológico"	18 April 2018	2.7
Sebastián learns that Ernesto Cifuentes was Leonora's lover and believes that he is his biological father. Juana Bárbara tries to separate Juana Inés and Mauricio. Sebastián accepts the friendship of Estefanía.
44	"Juana Victoria explota en celos"	19 April 2018	2.6
Juana Victoria realizes that Estefanía tries to approach Sebastián again and can not avoid making a scene of intense jealousy.
45	"Juana Inés logra vengarse de Juana Barbara"	20 April 2018	2.7
Estefanía starts a new strategy to conquer Sebastián. Juana Inés defends her love for Mauricio and takes revenge on Juana Bárbara. Jerome returns willing to reveal that Sebastian is his son.
46	"Darío tiene a Sebastián en sus manos"	23 April 2018	2.7
After running out of the profits of the timeshares, the Oropeza family starts a regime of total austerity and Sebastián is closer and closer to accepting Darío's proposal.
47	"Sebastián sospecha que Jerome es su padre"	24 April 2018	2.8
Juana Victoria and Sebastián draw conclusions in which they suspect that Jerome is Sebastián's real father, since Leonora was also very nervous when she saw Jerome.
48	"Juana Bárbara gana su primera pelea"	25 April 2018	2.7
Sebastián confirms that Jerome is his father. Juana Inés bets Mauricio's love with Juana Bárbara, who wins the first fight of the boxing tournament. Leonora finds out that Juan is in ruins.
49	"Leonora chantajea a Sebastián para que se case con Estefanía"	26 April 2018	2.9
Leonora pretends to be about to die to force Sebastián to fulfill her last will to see him marry Estefanía. Sebastián proposes Juana Victoria to escape together to live their love.
50	"Juana Victoria le rompe el corazón a Sebastián"	27 April 2018	2.6
Juana Victoria believes that Sebastián must accept Darío's proposal to solve his economic problems, tries to disappoint him by kissing Fernando, who makes him believe that he has a hope with her.
51	"Sebastián decide retomar su noviazgo con Estefanía"	30 April 2018	2.0
Juana Bárbara faces the murderous Russian, a boxer hired by Darío to prevent the Oropeza's from obtaining the money they need. Leonora manages to convince Sebastián to return with Estefanía.
52	"Juana Victoria y Fernando inician una relación"	1 May 2018	2.5
Estefanía discovers that Sebastián is in love with another woman and asks Darío for help. Mauricio finds out that Juana Bárbara and Juana Inés bet for his love. Fernando and Juana Victoria are already in a relationship.
53	"Juana Victoria descubre el chantaje de Leonora"	2 May 2018	2.6
Darío decides to reopen La Dolorosa in exchange for Mauricio working for him. Juana Victoria discovers that Leonora's depression was a farce to get Sebastián back with Estefanía.
54	"Juana Inés y Juana Barbara hacen las paces"	3 May 2018	2.8
Leonora continues her revenge against Juan for hiding that they are in ruins. Darío discovers that Sebastián is a lover of one of his sisters. Juana Inés and Juana Bárbara solve their problems.
55	"Juana Inés y Mauricio planean su primera noche romántica"	4 May 2018	2.3
Leonora tries to run over Margarita because she thinks she is Juan's lover. Darío asks Sebastián to end the relationship he has with his sister. Juana Inés and Mauricio decide to have sex.
56	"Mauricio le propone matrimonio a Juana Inés"	7 May 2018	2.9
Juana Ines is not ready to have sex, Mauricio feels that he has pressured her and to show her how much he loves her, he proposes marriage. Estefanía discovers that Sebastián is in love with his sister.
57	"Estefanía se enfrenta con Juana Victoria"	8 May 2018	2.5
While Sebastián tries to end his relationship with Estefanía, he finds out that Juan was arrested for hitting Ernesto Cifuentes. Juana Victoria reveals to Estefanía that Sebastián is not her brother.
58	"Sebastián decide casarse con Estefanía"	9 May 2018	2.5
Alberto threatens Juana Victoria with killing her sisters if he does not leave Mazatlan with Juana Bárbara and Margarita. Sebastián accepts the money that Darío offered him in exchange for marrying Estefanía.
59	"Sebastian adelanta su boda con Estefanía"	10 May 2018	1.8
After learning that Sebastián is getting married, Juana Victoria plans to set Alberto up. Sebastián decides to advance his wedding with Estefanía so that Juan goes free as soon as possible.
60	"Juana Victoria y Juana Bárbara arriesgan su vida para salvar a Alberto"	11 May 2018	2.2
Alberto dies tragically after attempting to rape Juana Bárbara. Sebastián leaves his wedding to try to help his father. Leonora forgives Juan shortly before being released.
61	"Juana Victoria le confiesa a Fernando que lo usó"	14 May 2018	2.4
Juana Victoria breaks Fernando's heart by confessing that she used him because she is in love with Sebastián. Estefanía is willing to separate Juana Victoria from Sebastián with the help of Darío.
62	"Leonora corre a Juana Victoria de su casa"	15 May 2018	2.5
Leonora forgets Estefanía's plan and gets Juana Victoria out of her house, but Juan becomes enraged and forces her to return. Juana Inés surprises Mauricio with a sensual change of look.
63	"Estefanía manipula a las hermanas de Juana Victoria"	16 May 2018	2.5
The war is declared, Estefanía wins the trust of the sisters of Juana Victoria, manages to put them against her by confessing that she and Sebastián have a secret relationship.
64	"La relación de Juana Victoria y Sebastián es descubierta"	17 May 2018	2.4
Darío submits Sebastián to marry with Estefanía at church, otherwise Juana Victoria will pay the consequences. The relationship between Juana Victoria and Sebastián is discovered by the Juanas.
65	"Estefanía atenta contra su propia vida"	18 May 2018	2.4
Estefanía makes everyone believe that Juana Victoria threw her against the window causing serious injuries. Darío tries to choke Juana Victoria in revenge for hurting his daughter.
66	"Juan quiere divorciarse de Leonora"	21 May 2018	2.6
Juan learns that Leonora faked her depression, which causes him to want a divorce. After suffering an anxiety attack, Estefanía follows her plan so that Juana Victoria disappears from her life.
67	"Fernando besa a Juana Bárbara"	22 May 2018	2.5
Sebastián tries to resume his relationship with Juana Victoria. Fernando kisses Juana Bárbara to convince her to return to her dream. Juana Soledad and Juana Inés are arrested by the police.
68	"Leonora se vuelve aliada de las Juanas"	23 May 2018	2.6
Estefanía asks the Juanas for further proof of their loyalty, and later loses control over Leonora, who decides to ally herself with the Juanas to help Darío's daughter.
69	"Estefanía tiene a Leonora en sus manos"	24 May 2018	2.7
Leonora changes her attitude towards the Juanas and looks for Estefanía to stop her blackmail, but Estefanía threatens to reveal her secret if he betrays her. Juana Inés hits Estefanía.
70	"Darío asesina a Ernesto Cifuentes"	25 May 2018	2.4
Deranged, Estefanía causes the death of Petunia. Father Camilo is not willing to marry Estefanía and Sebastián in the church. Darío kills Ernesto Cifuentes.
71	"Estefanía desaparece el día de su boda religiosa"	28 May 2018	2.5
Estefanía accepts that she has mental problems, regretfully asks Sebastián to forgive her. Estefanía does not arrive at her religious wedding and Juana Victoria could be a suspect of her disappearance.
72	"Juana Victoria es sospechosa de la desaparición de Estefanía"	29 May 2018	2.5
Dario fears that Estefanía committed suicide, desperate orders for her search. The Juanas are interrogated, and after several inconsistencies, Juana Victoria remains as a suspect of the disappearance of Estefanía.
73	"Juana Victoria va a prisión acusada de provocar la muerte de Estefanía"	30 May 2018	3.0
Darío accuses Juana Victoria and Sebastián of being responsible for the death of his daughter and demands justice. The investigations confirm that the fingerprints of the homicidal weapon correspond to Juana Victoria.
74	"Sebastián descubre que Estefanía está viva"	31 May 2018	2.5
Sebastián discovers that Estefanía did not die and faked her death to blame Juana Victoria. Darío orders the murder of Juana Victoria. Sebastián begins the search for Estefanía.
75	"Estefanía se entrega a las autoridades"	1 June 2018	2.7
Juana Victoria is released thanks to Estefanía who decides to surrender to the authorities and confess how she developed her plan to ruin the life of Juana Victoria and Sebastián.
76	"Juana Bárbara enfrenta a La Barby Juárez"	4 June 2018	2.9
Leonora suffers a heart attack after learning that Sebastián and Juana Victoria already know that they are not half brothers. Juana Bárbara faces the box champion 'La Barby Juárez'.
77	"Leonora es humillada por Darío"	5 June 2018	2.6
Leonora endures Darío's humiliations in exchange for keeping her secret hidden. Jerome returns to Mazatlán willing to become a Media Luna partner and confirms to Sebastian that he is his father.
78	"Los crímenes de Darío están a punto de ser descubiertos"	6 June 2018	2.7
Juan learns that Darío plans to destroy his marriage and is blackmailing Leonora. Thanks to Juana Soledad, Sebastián and Juan discover that Darío is responsible for the death of Ernesto Cifuentes.
79	"Leonora confiesa que Sebastián no es hijo de Juan"	7 June 2018	2.7
In the name of the love that Leonora feels for Sebastián, she decides to confess that he is not the son of Juan Oropeza. Darío is wanted by the police, but he manages to flee and as a revenge he plans the kidnapping of Leonora.
80	"Juana Victoria muere en brazos de Sebastián"	8 June 2018	2.8
Estefanía betrays Darío, in the middle of an operative she manages to flee. The day of the wedding of Juana Inés and Juana Soledad, finally arrived, but Juana Victoria is victim of the revenge of Darío and dies.
81	"Juana Victoria está viva"	10 June 2018	8.1
82	"Juana Victoria y Sebastián viven su amor libremente"	10 June 2018	8.1
The Oropeza family gives the last goodbye to Juana Victoria without suspecting that she did not die and it was all a plan of Darío to continue with the suffering of Sebastián and his revenge for making Estefanía suffer. Sebastián avoids that Juana Victoria loses her life in the hands of Darío, who dies frozen. Juana Victoria and Sebastián fulfill the dream of being together and loving each other freely for the rest of their lives. Alternative ending: After the supposed death of one of the daughters of Juan Oropeza, Darío removes Juana Victoria from the coffin and reveals that she was only part of the revenge he has against Sebastián.

=== Special ===
Title	Original release date
"Todos somos hijos de la luna, el inicio y algo más"	February 24, 2018
Special to relive the best moments of the telenovela.

== Awards and nominations ==
Year	Award	Category	Nominated	Result
2019	TVyNovelas Awards	Best Actress	Michelle Renaud	Nominated
2019	TVyNovelas Awards	Best Antagonist Actress	Mariluz Bermúdez	Nominated
2019	TVyNovelas Awards	Best Antagonist Actor	Alexis Ayala	Nominated
2019	TVyNovelas Awards	Best Leading Actress	Cynthia Klitbo	Nominated
2019	TVyNovelas Awards	Best Leading Actor	Omar Fierro	Nominated
2019	TVyNovelas Awards	Best Co-lead Actress	Geraldine Galván	Nominated
2019	TVyNovelas Awards	Best Co-lead Actor	Mario Morán	Nominated
2019	TVyNovelas Awards	Best Original Story or Adaptation	Alejandro Pohlenz and Palmira Olguín	Nominated
2019	TVyNovelas Awards	Best Direction	Salvador Sánchez and Alejandro Gamboa	Nominated
2019	TVyNovelas Awards	Best Direction of the Cameras	Gabriel Vazquez Bulman and Jesús Najera	Nominated
2019	TVyNovelas Awards	Best Musical Theme	"Tengo" (Timbiriche)	Nominated
2019	TVyNovelas Awards	Best Cast	Hijas de la luna	Nominated
