= Mariluz Bermúdez =

Costa Rican actor

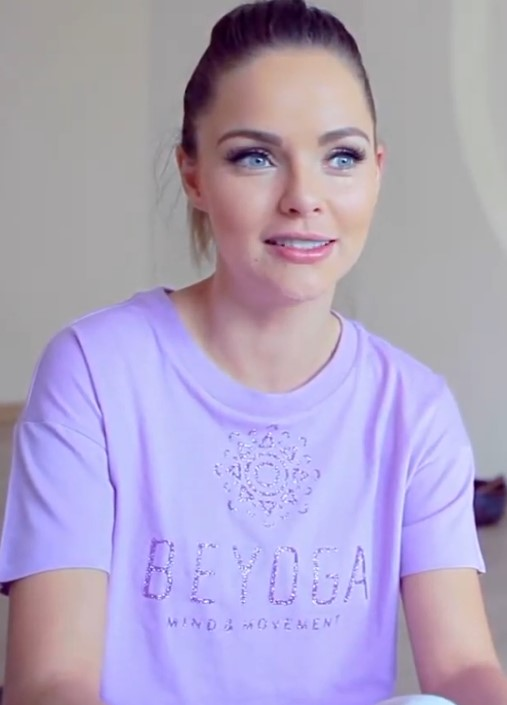
Mariluz Bermúdez

Mariluz Bermúdez Garnier is a Costa Rican television actress and model, known for her roles in the telenovelas Camaleones, Mentir para vivir, Corona de lágrimas and La Gata. She has posed for magazines such as H.

== Biography ==
Bermúdez was born in San José on February 26, 1986. After finishing her studies, she went to Mexico to study at the Televisa Center for Artistic Education (CEA).

She made her debut in 2008 in the television series Central de Abasto; later, in 2009, she participated in the telenovela Camaleones, where she played Lorena. She shared credits with Edith González, Belinda, and Alfonso Herrera, and was also part of the Mexican music group that shared the same name as the telenovela.

In 2015, Ignacio Sada chose her to play Diana in Simplemente María; Bermúdez said she would only have 24 chapters.

In late March 2016, she was chosen by Salvador Mejía Alejandre to co-star in the telenovela Las amazonas, which premiered on May 16, 2016.

== Filmography ==
Television roles
Year	Title	Roles	Notes
2009–2010	Camaleones	Lorena González	Recurring role
2011	Una familia con suerte	Karina	Recurring role
2012–2013	Corona de lágrimas	Cassandra	Recurring role; 19 episodes
2013	Mentir para vivir	Marilú Tapia	Recurring role; 76 episodes
2014	La Gata	Virginia Martínez Negrete	Recurring role; 75 episodes
2015–2016	Simplemente María	Diana	Recurring role; 24 episodes
2016	Las amazonas	Constanza	Main role; 62 episodes
2017	El Bienamado	Valeria Cienfuegos	Main role; 97 episodes
2018	Hijas de la luna	Estefanía Iriarte	Main role; 70 Episodes
2019	Doña Flor y sus dos maridos	Samantha Cabrera de Serrano	Main role; 65 Episodes
2021	Diseñando tu amor	Rosa María Ponce	Supporting role; 120 episodes
2022	Vencer la ausencia	Ana Sofi Ordax	Supporting role
2024	Vivir de amor	Fátima Aranda Rivero Cuéllar	Supporting role
2025	Me atrevo a amarte	Marisol Pérez-Soler Paz	

== Awards and nominations ==
=== TVyNovelas Awards ===
Year	Category	Telenovela	Result
2017	Best Young Lead Actress	Las amazonas	Nominated
2019	Best Antagonist Actress	Hijas de la luna	Nominated
