= Natalia Guerrero =

Mexican actress (born 1987)

- Born: Natalia Guerrero; September 9, 1987 (age 37); Irapuato, Guanajuato, Mexico
- Occupation: Actress
- Years active: 2011–present

Natalia Guerrero (born September 9, 1987, in Irapuato, Guanajuato, Mexico) is a Mexican actress.

== Life and career ==
Guerrero was born in Irapuato, Guanajuato, Mexico. In 2011, she graduated from the Centro de Educación Artística de Televisa (CEA). In addition to CEA, she studied at other schools like "Idea" and "Casa Azul."

She began her career as an actress in the 2011 film Así es la suerte. In 2012, she appeared in the telenovelas Amor bravío and Miss XV. As a theater actress, she has participated in Amor en Crimea, Seres incompletos, and El pánico. In 2013, she had a recurring role in the telenovela Libre para amarte starred by singer Gloria Trevi.

In 2014, Guerrero starred in the role of Daniela Suarez in the hit telenovela El color de la pasión, opposite Esmeralda Pimentel and Erick Elias. In 2015, she worked again with Esmeralda Pimentel and takes on a breakthrough role as the antagonist Isabel Cisneros in La vecina with Juan Diego Covarrubias. In 2016, she played the role of Lisete Quiroz in Las amazonas, starring an ensemble cast headed by Danna García and Andrés Palacios. In 2017, she was last seen as Cecilia Acevedo in El vuelo de la victoria starring Paulina Goto.

== Filmography ==
=== Telenovelas ===
| Year | Title | Role | Notes |
|---|---|---|---|
| 2013 | Libre para amarte | Gina Aristizábal | Recurring role |
| 2014 | El color de la pasión | Daniela Suárez | Supporting role |
| 2015 | La vecina | Isabel Cisneros | Main cast |
| 2016 | Las amazonas | Lisete Quiroz | Main cast |
| 2017 | El vuelo de la victoria | Cecilia Rosales de Acevedo | Supporting role |
| 2018 | Sin miedo a la verdad | Laura Díaz | Guest role (season 1) |

=== Anthology ===
| Year | Title | Role |
|---|---|---|
| 2012 | Como dice el dicho | Ana |

=== Films ===
| Year | Title |
|---|---|
| 2011 | Así es la suerte |
| 2013 | Vera |

=== Theatre ===
| Year | Title |
|---|---|
| 2010 | Amor en Crimea |
| 2012 | Seres incompletos |
| 2014 | El pánico |
