= Me atrevo a amarte =

- Genre: Telenovela
- Based on: Asi by Şebnem Çıtak & Gül Dirican
- Developed by: Katia Rodríguez Estrada; Doménica Tarello
- Written by: Enna Márquez; Julián Aguilar; Carolina Mejía Lartilleux
- Directed by: Fernando Nesme; Claudia E. Aguilar; Carolina Mejía Lartilleux
- Starring: Kimberly Dos Ramos; Rodrigo Guirao; Marlene Favela; Karyme Lozano; Horacio Pancheri; Mariluz Bermúdez; Christian de la Campa; Jackie Sauza; César Évora
- Theme music composer: Majo Aguilar
- Opening theme: "Cuéntame" by Alex Fernández & Majo Aguilar
- Composer: Álvaro Trespalacios
- Country of origin: Mexico
- Original language: Spanish
- No. of seasons: 1
- No. of episodes: 87

Production
- Executive producer: Salvador Mejía
- Producer: Laura Mezta Cordero
- Editors: Mark Rouch; Noé Galindo; Víctor Manuel Quiroz
- Camera setup: Multi-camera
- Production company: TelevisaUnivision

Original release
- Network: Las Estrellas
- Release: 24 February – 22 June 2025

Me atrevo a amarte (English: Dare to Love) is a Mexican telenovela produced by Salvador Mejía for TelevisaUnivision. It is based on the 2007 Turkish series Asi, created by Şebnem Çıtak and Gül Dirican. The series stars Kimberly Dos Ramos and Rodrigo Guirao. It aired on Las Estrellas from 24 February 2025 to 22 June 2025.

== Plot ==
The telenovela begins when Fernando Pérez-Soler unjustly orders his son Valente to unleash dogs to catch Alejandro, who is falsely accused of stealing an expensive watch. During the chase, Crisanta, mother of Alejandro and Ámbar, dies in the river. Déborah, Crisanta's sister, gives birth to Valente's son, but Delfino, the foreman, exchanges him for his dead son, making Valente believe that the baby died. Déborah must leave the ranch with her nephews, she blames Valente for all her tragedies and vows to take revenge on him. Valente marries Diana, daughter of the landowner Dionisio, believing that Déborah is a bad woman. Dionisio causes the death of his wife Olivia, when he learns that she is cheating on him with Fernando.

Twenty-five years later, Alejandro returns to town to seek justice for the death of his mother and for the harm done to his aunt Déborah, who also returns to the ranch with a desire for revenge. Alejandro meets Victoria when he saves her from drowning in the river, and from that moment on he falls in love with her, without realizing that she is the daughter of Valente, who he believes is guilty of his mother's death. Victoria will have to face the hatred of Déborah, Alejandro's aunt, who will use Lucrecia, Alejandro's ex-girlfriend, to separate the couple.

Valente's life is turned upside down when he learns that Gabino, the son he had with Déborah, never died. Déborah also discovers that her son is alive, she finds him and manipulates him with her vengeful attitude. Alejandro will learn that Dionisio stole some land from his father, causing his death; and that Valente, in reality, is a victim of Deborah's evil plans. The only thing that will matter to Alejandro is to show Victoria that he never wanted to harm her and that he loves her deeply.

== Cast ==
=== Main ===
- Kimberly Dos Ramos as Victoria Pérez-Soler Paz
- Rodrigo Guirao as Alejandro Sánchez-Guerra Méndez
- Marlene Favela as Deborah Méndez
- Karyme Lozano as Diana Paz Aguilar
- Horacio Pancheri as Alito Buitron
- Mariluz Bermúdez as Marisol Pérez-Soler Paz
- Christian de la Campa as Ángel Monteiro
- Jackie Sauza as Lucrecia Monteiro
- César Évora as Valente Pérez-Soler / Fernando Pérez-Soler
  - Mark Tacher as young Valente
- Rocío de Santiago as Paloma Pérez-Soler Paz
- Regina Villaverde as Mía Pérez-Soler Paz
- Paty Díaz as Carmen García
- Juan Pablo Gil as Gabino Mendoza García
- Ignacio Guadalupe as Delfino Mendoza
- Mauricio Aspe as Father Juan Diego
- Marco Uriel as Efrain Maldonado
- Adriana Parra as Evelia Romero
- Arturo Lorca as Dr. Lorca
- Jorge Gallegos as Facundo Maldonado
- Vanessa de la Sota as Ximena
- Fernando Manzano as Severino
- Víctor Hugo Villanueva as Juan Mendoza García
- Arantza Ruiz as Ambar Sánchez-Guerra Méndez
- Elaine Haro as Elisa Maldonado
- Sergio Madrigal as David Larios
- Naomi Hernández as Hilda Jiménez
- Emilio Palacios as Max
- Mariano Soria as Chuy
- Salvador Pineda as Dionisio Paz Chavarria

=== Guest stars ===
- Danna García as Olivia
- Luis Bayardo as Panchito
- Sergio Kleiner as Luis
- Rebeca Manríquez as Estrella
- Lisset as Crisanta Méndez
- Roberto Tello as Prieto

== Production ==
On 25 October 2024, Me atrevo a amarte was announced as the title of Salvador Mejía's upcoming telenovela. On 5 November 2024, Marlene Favela was announced as the antagonist of the telenovela. A week later, Kimberly Dos Ramos and Rodrigo Guirao were confirmed in the lead roles. Throughout the remainder of the month, Mejía announced additional cast names on his social media pages including Horacio Pancheri, Mariluz Bermúdez, Christian de la Campa, Karyme Lozano and César Évora. On 25 November 2024, Danna García was cast in a guest role. Filming of the telenovela began on 3 December 2024.

== Ratings ==
Viewership and ratings per season of Me atrevo a amarte
| Season | Timeslot (CT) | Episodes | First aired | | Last aired | | Avg. viewers (millions) |
| Season | Timeslot (CT) | Episodes | Date | Viewers (millions) | Date | Viewers (millions) | Avg. viewers (millions) |
|---|---|---|---|---|---|---|---|
| 1 | Mon–Fri 6:30 p.m. | 87 | 24 February 2025 | 4.68 | 22 June 2025 | 4.36 | 3.77 |

== Episodes ==
| No. | Title | Original release date | Mexico viewers (millions) |
|---|---|---|---|
| 1 | "Los maldigo con todo el corazón" | 24 February 2025 (Note: Premiered early online through Las Estrellas website on 21 February 2025.) | 4.68 |
| 2 | "Necesito saber la verdad" | 25 February 2025 | 4.57 |
| 3 | "Nadie olvida una desgracia" | 26 February 2025 | 4.80 |
| 4 | "Salvaremos la hacienda" | 27 February 2025 | 4.57 |
| 5 | "Una suerte de alto riesgo" | 28 February 2025 | 4.08 |
| 6 | "Debes odiarla, no besarla" | 3 March 2025 | 4.28 |
| 7 | "Todo eso pertenece al pasado" | 4 March 2025 | 4.01 |
| 8 | "¿Nos quiere quitar la hacienda?" | 5 March 2025 | 3.70 |
| 9 | "La vida me está castigando" | 6 March 2025 | 3.95 |
| 10 | "Lo prohibido es lo más anhelado" | 7 March 2025 | 4.09 |
| 11 | "Su corazón ya tiene dueña" | 10 March 2025 | 4.00 |
| 12 | "Lo que se ve no se juzga" | 11 March 2025 | 3.80 |
| 13 | "Valente es inocente" | 12 March 2025 | 4.11 |
| 14 | "Podría morir en tus brazos" | 13 March 2025 | 3.92 |
| 15 | "Un hombre que colecciona mujeres" | 14 March 2025 | 4.34 |
| 16 | "El amor es ciego y la locura lo acompaña" | 17 March 2025 | 4.02 |
| 17 | "Adiós, mi Briosa" | 18 March 2025 | 3.79 |
| 18 | "Tus ojos no mienten" | 19 March 2025 | 3.87 |
| 19 | "Alejandro no te ama" | 20 March 2025 | 3.57 |
| 20 | "Castígalo con tu indiferencia" | 21 March 2025 | 3.68 |
| 21 | "Mal de amores" | 24 March 2025 | 3.73 |
| 22 | "No hay peor ciego que el que no quiere ver" | 25 March 2025 | 3.53 |
| 23 | "El típico machito" | 26 March 2025 | 4.02 |
| 24 | "Falsificación de dinero" | 27 March 2025 | 3.66 |
| 25 | "No estás sola" | 28 March 2025 | 3.28 |
| 26 | "Bendito seas, Alejandro Sánchez-Guerra" | 31 March 2025 | 3.63 |
| 27 | "Ella no te ama, yo sí" | 1 April 2025 | 3.51 |
| 28 | "Estaba dispuesto a todo por tí" | 2 April 2025 | 3.95 |
| 29 | "¡No metas a Dios en esto!" | 3 April 2025 | 3.70 |
| 30 | "Tengo que sacarla de mi camino" | 4 April 2025 | 3.62 |
| 31 | "Llevamos la misma sangre" | 7 April 2025 | 3.72 |
| 32 | "La hacienda a cambio de tu hijo" | 8 April 2025 | 3.30 |
| 33 | "De esta no salen vivos" | 9 April 2025 | 3.95 |
| 34 | "La desgracia de dos familias" | 10 April 2025 | 3.36 |
| 35 | "¿Te crees Dios?" | 11 April 2025 | 3.36 |
| 36 | "Eres un Pérez-Soler" | 14 April 2025 | 3.54 |
| 37 | "Ella volvió buscando venganza" | 15 April 2025 | 3.60 |
| 38 | "Reniego de mi madre" | 16 April 2025 | 4.15 |
| 39 | "Déborah me amenazó" | 17 April 2025 | 3.11 |
| 40 | "Déborah quiere que vivas en su casa" | 18 April 2025 | 3.07 |
| 41 | "Nos casaremos en secreto" | 21 April 2025 | 3.71 |
| 42 | "Gabino destruirá a tu familia" | 22 April 2025 | 3.72 |
| 43 | "Nada podrá separarnos" | 23 April 2025 | 4.09 |
| 44 | "Tu lugar es junto a ella" | 24 April 2025 | 3.65 |
| 45 | "¡Teníamos un trato!" | 25 April 2025 | 3.86 |
| 46 | "Pronto tendremos un hijo" | 28 April 2025 | 3.27 |
| 47 | "¡Estoy embarazada!" | 29 April 2025 | 3.52 |
| 48 | "Ya no me sirves de nada" | 30 April 2025 | 3.11 |
| 49 | "¡Ustedes me engañaron!" | 1 May 2025 | 3.73 |
| 50 | "Donde hubo fuego" | 2 May 2025 | 3.14 |
| 51 | "Ocúpate de tu vida y déjame en paz" | 5 May 2025 | 3.95 |
| 52 | "Como enemigo, es de temer" | 6 May 2025 | 3.71 |
| 53 | "No hay borracho que coma lumbre" | 7 May 2025 | 3.70 |
| 54 | "La vida nos hace justicia" | 8 May 2025 | 3.15 |
| 55 | "Nuestro amor nos unirá siempre" | 9 May 2025 | 3.65 |
| 56 | "Ya no hay nosotros" | 12 May 2025 | 3.94 |
| 57 | "Quiero estar cerca de mi hija" | 13 May 2025 | 3.73 |
| 58 | "El primer amor no se olvida" | 14 May 2025 | 3.58 |
| 59 | "Cuando el río suena, agua lleva" | 15 May 2025 | 3.37 |
| 60 | "Se acabó el amor" | 16 May 2025 | 3.84 |
| 61 | "No pienso alejarme de ti" | 19 May 2025 | 3.45 |
| 62 | "Yo no soy una Pérez-Soler" | 20 May 2025 | 3.37 |
| 63 | "¿Prefieres jugar a la casita?" | 21 May 2025 | 3.68 |
| 64 | "Te sigo amando" | 22 May 2025 | 3.47 |
| 65 | "¿Te parecen pocas mis desgracias?" | 23 May 2025 | 3.61 |
| 66 | "Estoy segura de amarte" | 26 May 2025 | 3.44 |
| 67 | "¿Esta señora es mi madre?" | 27 May 2025 | 3.68 |
| 68 | "¡Es mi hermana!" | 28 May 2025 | 3.76 |
| 69 | "Alejandro va a destapar la cloaca" | 29 May 2025 | 3.53 |
| 70 | "Regalo de bodas" | 30 May 2025 | 3.48 |
| 71 | "El nuevo dueño" | 2 June 2025 | 3.67 |
| 72 | "Me diste la vida" | 3 June 2025 | 4.00 |
| 73 | "¡Ahí tienes la verdad!" | 4 June 2025 | 3.63 |
| 74 | "Que Dios te perdone" | 5 June 2025 | 3.75 |
| 75 | "Mi silencio tiene un precio" | 6 June 2025 | 3.94 |
| 76 | "Todo te acusa" | 9 June 2025 | 3.50 |
| 77 | "¿Alejandro siempre me mintió?" | 10 June 2025 | 3.50 |
| 78 | "Te conseguiré un testigo" | 11 June 2025 | 3.75 |
| 79 | "Negocios son negocios" | 12 June 2025 | 3.88 |
| 80 | "¡Se fue el mal de esta casa!" | 13 June 2025 | 3.72 |
| 81 | "No le temo al diablo" | 16 June 2025 | 3.92 |
| 82 | "Victoria es mi vida" | 17 June 2025 | 4.22 |
| 83 | "¿Tan grande es tu odio?" | 18 June 2025 | 4.31 |
| 84 | "Ojo por ojo" | 19 June 2025 | 4.32 |
| 85 | "Tienes el corazón podrido" | 20 June 2025 | 4.36 |
| 86 | "Sabía que volverías" | 22 June 2025 | 4.36 |
| 87 | "Mi deber es protegerte" | 22 June 2025 | 4.36 |
