= Las Juanas (Mexican TV series) =

- Genre: Telenovela
- Created by: Bernardo Romero Pereiro
- Based on: Las Juanas by Bernardo Romero Pereiro
- Written by: Víctor Civeira; Gabriel Pérez Lau; Gabriel Santos
- Story by: Bernardo Romero Pereiro
- Directed by: Martín Luna; Alejandro Gamboa
- Creative director: Alejandro Gamboa
- Starring: Fernando Luján; Margarita Sanz; Ana Serradilla; Martha Higareda; Paola Núñez; Claudia Álvarez; Vanessa Cato; Andrés Palacios
- Theme music composer: Fernando Borrego Linares
- Opening theme: "Un montón de estrellas" by Polo Montañez
- Country of origin: Mexico
- Original language: Spanish
- No. of episodes: 130

Production
- Executive producer: Emilia Lamothe
- Producers: Alexa Muñoz; Fides Velasco
- Cinematography: Karla Farjeat
- Editor: Marco Iván González
- Camera setup: Multi-camera
- Production company: TV Azteca

Original release
- Network: Azteca Trece
- Release: September 6, 2004 – March 4, 2005

Related
- Hijas de la luna

Las Juanas is a Mexican telenovela created Bernardo Romero Pereiro, based on the 1997 Colombian telenovela of the same name written by the same creator. The series originally aired from September 6, 2004 to March 4, 2005.

It stars Fernando Luján, Margarita Sanz, Ana Serradilla, Martha Higareda, Paola Núñez, Claudia Álvarez, Vanessa Cato, and Andrés Palacios.

== Plot ==
"Las Juanas" is the story of five sisters in a forgotten little town reminiscent of Gabriel García Marquez’s hundred years of solitude; headed by Juana Valentina (Ana Serradilla), a brave dreamer who, upon her mother’s death, discovers the true identity of her father, Calixto Matamoros (Fernando Luján). Juana Valentina decides to go in search of her father and discovers that not only was she an illegitimate child, she was not the only one, as her father’s romantic adventures included four other women (in addition to his wife) with whom he also procreated other daughters. This strange twist of fate places Juana Valentina in the Calixto household where she meets Álvaro (Andrés Palacios), whom she falls madly in love with at first sight, until she discovers the possibility that he is her half brother, which seems to impede their love forever. While we wait for fate to reveal the truth, Juana Valentina meets her sisters: Juana Micaela (Paola Núñez), Juana Carolina (Martha Higareda), Juana Martina and Juana Prudencia (Claudia Álvarez). Not only do these women garner more than one stolen glance in town for their great beauty and charms, they come together to create a new family, under the protection of Calixto himself, forever bound by the ties of blood that joins them. Each one will find their love and destiny in the little town of Tierra Caliente.

== Cast ==
=== Main ===
- Fernando Luján as Calixto Matamoros
- Margarita Sanz as Doña Gallardo de Matamoros
- Ana Serradilla as Juana Valentina
- Martha Higareda as Juana Carolina
- Paola Núñez as Juana Micaela
- Claudia Álvarez as Juana Prudencia
- Vanessa Cato as Juana Martina
- Andrés Palacios as Juan Álvaro

=== Recurring ===
- Carmen Beato as Carlota
- José Carlos Rodríguez as Carmelo
- Alma Rosa Añorve as Guillermina
- Juan Pablo Medina as Eliseo
- Guillermo Iván as Miguel
- Cynthia Vázquez as Clara Mercedes
- Jean Duverger as Todomundo
- Faisy as Gualberto
- Andrés Montiel as Gabriel Gallardo
- Alejandro Barrios as Rodrigo
- Maribel Rodríguez as Gertrudis
