= Tu voz estéreo =

- Also known as: Juventud en sintonía
- Genre: Drama, Family, Comedy
- Created by: Daniel Bautista
- Presented by: Lucas Buelvas; Tania Valencia; Former: Alejandra Buitrago; Pedro Falla; Vanessa Chapplot; María José Martínez Turrini; Franartur Duque; Catalina Aristizábal; Juan Pablo Espinosa; Ítalo Londeros; Sharon Dummeth; Alejandro Estrada; Michelle Rouillard Estrada; María Laura Quintero; Alejandra Isaza
- Starring: Various actors
- Theme music composer: Pedrina
- Opening theme: Tu Voz
- Country of origin: Colombia
- Original language: Spanish
- No. of seasons: 9
- No. of episodes: +2700

Production
- Producer: Daniel Bautista
- Production location: Bogotá

Original release
- Network: Caracol Televisión
- Release: 2006 – March 25, 2020

Tu Voz Estéreo is a Colombian anthology series on Caracol Television, produced by Daniel Bautista. Among its initial librettists were Saldarriaga and Julio Ricardo Castaneda. Among its key players were Milena (Catalina Aristizabal) y Alejo (Juan Pablo Espinosa), after entering Andrea (María José Martínez Turrini) and Felipe (Ítalo Londeros). Because Italo Londeros left the series, the new speaker was Sebastian (Alejandro Estrada), ex-contestant Protagonistas de novela of RCN Televisión.

== Synopsis ==
This serial is set in a radio studio, focusing on a program called Tu voz estéreo, Juventud en sintonía. The host, Milena Orozco (Catalina Aristizabal), then Andrea Giraldo (Maria Jose Martinez) listened to young people and their problems. Andrea Milena not only listens, but helps, along with first Alejo (Juan Pablo Espinosa) and then Felipe (Italo Londeros), to solve the problems that often become complaints.

The January 21, 2008, opened the 300th episode and in January 2010, the number 1000, of the fourth season, which had guest stars. It is produced Tu Voz Stereo and continued releasing chapters every day of the week regular hours of 18:00 to 19:00.

== Cast ==
Current

Actor	Character	Year
Lucas Buelvas	Caleb Daza	2016–2020
Tania Valencia	Zoe Luna	2019–2020

Former

Actor	Character	Year
Alejandra Buitrago	Laura Guzman	2016-2019
Pedro Falla	Andrés Vera	2013-2016
Michelle Rouillard Estrada	Sara Rendón	2011-2016
Alejandro Estrada	Sebastián López	2009-2013
María José Martínez Turrini	Andrea Giraldo	2007-2011
Ítalo Londero	Felipe Guzmán	2007-2009
Catalina Aristizábal	Milena Orozco	2006-2007
Juan Pablo Espinosa	Alejo Quiñones	2006-2007

=== Special guests ===
Actor	Character	Year
Alejandra Isaza	Ana Cruz	2016-2018
Emerson Rodríguez	Diego	2017
Stephany Martinez	Silvia	2017-2018
Ana María Arboleda	Fernanda	2016
María Laura Quintero	Tania	2016
Vanessa Chapplot	Catalina	2008
Sharon Dummeth	Susana	2008
