= El Bienamado =

Mexican telenovela

- Genre: Telenovela
- Created by: Kary Fajer; Ximena Suárez
- Based on: O Bem-Amado by Alfredo Dias Gomes
- Screenplay by: Gerardo Luna; Julián Aguilar
- Directed by: Salvador Garcini
- Starring: Jesús Ochoa; Mariluz Bermúdez; Mark Tacher; Andrés Palacios
- Theme music composer: Édgard Barrera; Jorge Eduardo Murguía; Mauricio Arriaga
- Opening theme: "Bienamado" performed by Banda MS
- Composer: Jorge Avendaño
- Country of origin: Mexico
- Original language: Spanish
- No. of seasons: 1
- No. of episodes: 96

Production
- Executive producer: Nicandro Díaz González
- Producer: Antonio Arvizu Velásquez
- Cinematography: Ricardo Navarrete; David Cabrera Martínez
- Camera setup: Multi-camera

Original release
- Network: Las Estrellas
- Release: January 23 – June 4, 2017

Related
- Tres veces Ana; Mi marido tiene familia; O Bem-Amado

El Bienamado is a Mexican telenovela produced by Nicandro Díaz González for Televisa. It is an adaptation of the Brazilian telenovela written by Dias Gomes, titled O Bem-Amado produced in 1973. It stars Jesús Ochoa as the titular character.

== Plot ==
Odorico Cienfuegos (Jesús Ochoa), is a politician who wins the elections for the prefecture of a small municipality called Loreto, under the promise of building a new cemetery. To obtain this position, he counts on the help of three sisters: Justina (Chantal Andere), Dulcina (Nora Salinas), Santina (Irán Castillo), with whom he maintains an amorous adventure, without the sisters knowing between them.

But in spite of this conflict, Odorico's greatest problem is his daughter Valeria (Mariluz Bermúdez), who returns to the town and falls madly in love with Leon Serrano (Mark Tacher), the new doctor of the region. Valeria and Leon met in Mexico City after Valeria had an overdose from alcohol. Leon quickly becomes Odorico's enemy. Odorico, obsessed with the famous cemetery, quickly needs someone to die. However, no case of death has been recorded in recent times, causing Odorico to use every chance he has to tell a depressed citizen, such as Liborio, who is abandoned by his wife several times, that they will have a great funeral.

== Cast ==
=== Main ===
- Jesús Ochoa as Odorico Cienfuegos
- Mariluz Bermúdez as Valeria Samperio
- Mark Tacher as León Serrano
- Andrés Palacios as Homero Fuentes
- Nora Salinas as Dulcina Samperio
- Chantal Andere as Justina Samperio
- Irán Castillo as Santina Samperio
- Salvador Zerboni as Jairo Portela
- Alejandra Sandoval as Melissa
- Alejandra García as Tania Mendoza
- Diego de Erice as Dirceo Retana
- Fernando Ciangherotti as Genovevo Morones
- Gabriela Zamora as Paquita Patiño
- Luis Manuel Ávila as Pepón Cano
- Luis Gatica as Ambrosio Cárdenas
- Polo Morín as Jordi de Ovando
- Raquel Pankowsky as Concordia Briceño
- Roberto Romano as Alexis Cienfuegos
- Ricardo Fastlicht as Trevor
- Dayrén Chávez as Jovita
- Raquel Morell as Generosa
- Michelle Rodríguez as Estrella
- César Bono as Padre Dimas
- Reynaldo Rossano as Fidel
- Ricardo Margaleff as Juancho López
- Ricardo Silva as Liborio Galicia Ortíz
- Chao as Binicio Luna
- Memo Dorantes as Camilo
- Fernando Larragaña
- Pepe Olivares as Sortero Bermejo
- Mauricio Castillo as Quirino
- Tony Balardi as Jilguero
- José Montini as Policía Pomponio
- Diana Golden as Abigaíl de Morones
- Eduardo Rodríguez as Carrasco
- Eduardo Manzano as Don Arcadio Mendoza
- Laura Zapata as Bruna Mendoza

=== Recurring ===
- Martín Brek as Arnulfo
- Rosita Bouchot as Talita Prieto
- Jaime Garza as Apolo

=== Special participation ===
- Jacqueline Bracamontes as Laura
- Joana Brito as Doña Nati - The guest appearance marked Brito's final television appearance before her death in 2023.
- Olivia Collins as Olguita Montes

== Production ==
The telenovela is written by Kary Fajer and Ximena Suárez, based on the original idea of Dias Gomes. Production of the series began on November 8, 2016 in Loreto, Baja California Sur.

=== Casting ===
Before production, actors like Jorge Salinas and Fernando Ciangherotti were rumored to be the main character of the story. It was later revealed that Jesús Ochoa was confirmed as the protagonist, and Ciangherotti was chosen as supporting actor.

== Episodes ==
No.	Title	Original release date	U.S. air date	US viewers (millions)
1	"La promesa de Odorico"	23 January 2017	2 May 2017	0.53
2	"León salva la vida de Valeria"	24 January 2017	3 May 2017	0.50
3	"Odorico quiere ser un padre ejemplar"	25 January 2017	4 May 2017	0.52
4	"León no logra salvar la vida de Laura"	26 January 2017	5 May 2017	0.50
5	"Valeria está enamorada"	27 January 2017	8 May 2017	0.36
6	"León se culpa por la muerte de Laura"	30 January 2017	9 May 2017	0.41
7	"Valeria pone a Homero en su lugar"	31 January 2017	10 May 2017	0.36
8	"Genovevo Morones es acusado de violar"	1 February 2017	11 May 2017	0.43
9	"Pepón intenta cumplir su promesa"	2 February 2017	12 May 2017	0.45
10	"Odorico demuestra su valentía"	3 February 2017	15 May 2017	0.55
11	"Homero se niega a declarar"	6 February 2017	16 May 2017	0.45
12	"El día de las elecciones"	7 February 2017	17 May 2017	0.44
13	"Odorico Cienfuegos gana las elecciones"	8 February 2017	18 May 2017	0.43
14	"Odorico es recibido como alcalde"	9 February 2017	19 May 2017	0.49
15	"Santina está embarazada"	10 February 2017	29 May 2017	0.38
16	"León es el nuevo médico de Loreto"	13 February 2017	30 May 2017	0.39
17	"Tania enfrenta a Odorico"	14 February 2017	31 May 2017	0.43
18	"Santina y Dirceo se pierden en el bosque"	15 February 2017	5 June 2017	0.36
19	"Dirceo y Santina se tienen que casar"	16 February 2017	6 June 2017	0.41
20	"Valeria se va del pueblo"	17 February 2017	7 June 2017	0.43
21	"León cancela la reinauguración del centro de salud"	20 February 2017	9 June 2017	0.36
22	"Valeria y León se reencuentran"	21 February 2017	12 June 2017	0.31
23	"Odorico quiere ser buen padre"	22 February 2017	13 June 2017	0.34
24	"Odorico y Jairo inauguraran Industrias Pesca-Mar"	23 February 2017	14 June 2017	0.34
25	"Dirceo y Santina se casan"	24 February 2017	15 June 2017	0.30
26	"El secreto de Dirceo es revelado"	27 February 2017	16 June 2017	0.44
27	"Valeria finge estar muerta"	28 February 2017	19 June 2017	0.35
28	"León salva la vida de Concordia"	1 March 2017	20 June 2017	0.31
29	"Valeria sorprende a León"	2 March 2017	21 June 20	0.26
30	"Liborio revivió"	3 March 2017	22 June 2017	0.25
31	"Valeria y León tienen un romántico encuentro"	6 March 2017	23 June 2017	0.44
32	"Dirceo y Santina serán papás"	7 March 2017	26 June 2017	0.23
33	"Valeria decide alejarse de León"	8 March 2017	27 June 2017	0.25
34	"León renuncia al Centro de Salud"	9 March 2017	29 June 2017	0.32
35	"Odorico quiere ver a León en la cárcel"	10 March 2017	30 June 2017	0.33
36	"Tania le grita a Valeria que es una roba hombres"	13 March 2017	3 July 2017	0.23
37	"León humilla a Valeria"	14 March 2017	4 July 2017	0.35
38	"Homero confiesa que ama a Valeria"	15 March 2017	5 July 2017	0.37
39	"Odorico castiga a Jordi y Alexis"	16 March 2017	6 July 2017	0.37
40	"Homero es señalado como traidor"	17 March 2017	10 July 2017	0.33
41	"Valeria y León se entregan al amor"	20 March 2017	10 July 2017	0.28
42	"Odorico acusa a los Mendoza de secuestro"	21 March 2017	17 July 2017	0.25
43	"Timoteo regresa a casa de las Samperio"	22 March 2017	18 July 2017	0.23
44	"Luz Marina confiesa que Jairo la atacó"	23 March 2017	20 July 2017	0.30
45	"Odorico invita a Chuy Muertes a Loreto"	24 March 2017	21 July 2017	0.29
46	"Melissa vivirá en casa de Odorico"	27 March 2017	24 July 2017	0.35
47	"Alexis y Jordi le dan una lección a Jairo"	28 March 2017	25 July 2017	0.28
48	"Chuy Muertes llega a Loreto"	29 March 2017	26 July 2017	0.25
49	"Homero enfrenta a León"	30 March 2017	27 July 2017	0.29
50	"Valeria y Homero deciden darse una oportunidad"	31 March 2017	28 July 2017	0.22
51	"Chuy Muertes, una amenaza latente"	3 April 2017	TBA	N/A
52	"Homero se salva de morir"	4 April 2017	TBA	N/A
53	"Odorico quiere que León se vaya"	5 April 2017	TBA	N/A
54	"Justina acusa a Tania de asesina"	6 April 2017	TBA	N/A
55	"Jordi aparece"	7 April 2017	TBA	N/A
56	"El pueblo está en peligro de muerte"	10 April 2017	TBA	N/A
57	"Chuy ayuda a Odorico"	11 April 2017	TBA	N/A
58	"Alexis está enamorado de Melissa"	12 April 2017	TBA	N/A
59	"León acepta la ayuda de Valeria"	13 April 2017	TBA	N/A
60	"Homero le propone a Tania que sean amigos"	14 April 2017	TBA	N/A
61	"Jairo está en manos de Odorico"	17 April 2017	TBA	N/A
62	"Valeria sacará a Léon de su vida"	18 April 2017	TBA	N/A
63	"Valeria acepta casarse con Homero"	19 April 2017	TBA	N/A
64	"León es inocente"	20 April 2017	TBA	N/A
65	"Valeria recibe el anillo de compromiso"	21 April 2017	TBA	N/A
66	"Liborio se suicida"	24 April 2017	TBA	N/A
67	"Liborio aparece vivo"	25 April 2017	TBA	N/A
68	"Pepón y Ambrosio regresan"	26 April 2017	TBA	N/A
69	"Odorico sufre una fuerte depresión"	27 April 2017	TBA	N/A
70	"Gloriana y Homero salen libres"	28 April 2017	TBA	N/A
71	"Valeria se siente traicionada"	1 May 2017	TBA	N/A
72	"Santina ya es mamá"	2 May 2017	TBA	N/A
73	"Odorico provoca la furia de Chuy Muertes"	3 May 2017	TBA	N/A
74	"Valeria y León son novios"	4 May 2017	TBA	N/A
75	"Chuy Muertes amenaza a Odorico"	5 May 2017	TBA	N/A
76	"Odorico descubre a Melissa con Alexis"	8 May 2017	TBA	N/A
77	"Odorico busca venganza"	9 May 2017	TBA	N/A
78	"Valeria y León se entregan al amor"	10 May 2017	TBA	N/A
79	"Alexis es el nuevo cartero de Loreto"	11 May 2017	TBA	N/A
80	"Mateo Mendoza y Juvenal Samperio se enfrentan"	12 May 2017	TBA	N/A
81	"Mateo y Juvenal ajustan cuentas"	15 May 2017	TBA	N/A
82	"Juvenal se salva de morir"	16 May 2017	TBA	N/A
83	"Odorico conquistará a Melissa"	17 May 2017	TBA	N/A
84	"Valeria ya sabe el secreto de Santina"	18 May 2017	TBA	N/A
85	"Alexis sospecha que no es hijo de Odorico"	19 May 2017	TBA	N/A
86	"Valeria y Alexis remueven el pasado"	22 May 2017	TBA	N/A
87	"Tania y Alexis, ¿Hermanos?"	23 May 2017	TBA	N/A
88	"Chuy Muertes es arrestado"	24 May 2017	TBA	N/A
89	"León y Homero ayudan a Vladimiro"	25 May 2017	TBA	N/A
90	"Vladimiro regresa"	26 May 2017	TBA	N/A
91	"Santina está en peligro de muerte"	29 May 2017	TBA	N/A
92	"Ambrosio no es el papá de Luz Marina"	30 May 2017	TBA	N/A
93	"Tania está gravemente herida"	31 May 2017	TBA	N/A
94	"Dirceo debe cumplir una importante misión"	1 June 2017	TBA	N/A
95	"Santina muere"	2 June 2017	TBA	N/A
96	"Gran final"	4 June 2017	TBA	N/A

== Awards and nominations ==
Year	Award	Category	Nominated	Result
2018	TVyNovelas Awards	Best Telenovela of the Year	Nicandro Díaz González	Nominated
