= Amores cruzados =

- Also known as: Crossed Hearts
- Created by: Luís Felipe Salamanca; Susana Prieto
- Developed by: TV Azteca and Caracol TV Internacional
- Directed by: Carlos Villegas; Diego Mejía
- Starring: Ana Lucía Domínguez; Michel Gurfi; Patricia Vásquez; David Zepeda
- Theme music composer: Jose Gamba
- Opening theme: "No Te pido Flores" Performed by Fanny Lú "Amores Cruzados"
- Countries of origin: Mexico; Colombia
- Original language: Spanish
- No. of episodes: 120

Production
- Executive producers: Pedro Luevano G. Jorge Valencia; Marlon Rojas
- Producers: Feliciano Torres; Dago Garcia; Martin Luna
- Production locations: Mexico City, Cartagena de Indias
- Editor: Miguel Angel Sanchez C
- Camera setup: Multi-camera
- Running time: 42 minutes

Original release
- Network: Azteca 13, Caracol Television
- Release: April 17 – September 29, 2006

Amores Cruzados (Crossed Hearts) is a telenovela produced by TV Azteca and Caracol TV Internacional. It premiered in 2006. The protagonists are David Zepeda, Michel Gurfi, Ana Lucia Dominguez and Patricia Vasquez. The telenovela was filmed in Mexico and Colombia.

== Cast ==
=== Main cast ===
- Ana Lucía Domínguez.... María
- Michel Gurfi.... Alejandro
- Patricia Vásquez.... Elisa
- David Zepeda.... Diego

=== Primary cast ===
- Evangelina Elizondo.... Sara
- Patricia Bernal.... Fabiola
- Fernando Ciangherotti.... Federico

=== Secondary cast ===
- Claudia Álvarez.... Sofía
- Andrea López.... Déborah Smith
- Lina Angarita.... Ruth
- Julián Arango.... Santiago
- Rodolfo Arias.... Antonio
- Johana Bahamón.... Julieta
- Antonio Bejarano.... Eugenia
- Óscar Borda.... Ismael
- Sebastián Caicedo.... Ramón
- Dora Cordero.... Magdalena
- Christian Correa.... Álvaro
- Socorro de la Campa.... Lupe
- Luis Miguel Lombana.... Pedro
- José Luis Penagos.... José
- Cecilia Piñeiro.... Laura
- Laura Sotelo.... Carmen
- Georgina Tábora.... Gertrudis
- Alberto Valdiri.... Jorge
- Janete Bejarano.... Eugenia
- Isabel Cristina Estrada
- Juan David Galindo
