= El vuelo de la victoria =

Mexican telenovela

- Genre: Telenovela
- Created by: Carlos Romero
- Written by: María Antonieta Gutiérrez; Anthony Martínez; Lorena Salazar
- Directed by: Víctor Rodríguez; Juan Carlos Muñoz
- Starring: Paulina Goto; Andrés Palacios; Mané de la Parra
- Music by: Mauricio Arriaga; Jorge Eduardo Murguía
- Opening theme: "Me enamoré" by Patrizio Buanne
- Country of origin: Mexico
- Original language: Spanish
- No. of episodes: 89

Production
- Executive producer: Nathalie Lartilleux

Original release
- Network: Las Estrellas
- Release: July 10 – November 12, 2017

El vuelo de la victoria (English: The Flight to Victory) is a Mexican telenovela produced by Nathalie Lartilleux for Televisa. The telenovela follows the story of Victoria a young runner who finds in athletics a way to make sense of her life and will fight to get a place in the Olympics. It stars Paulina Goto, Mané de la Parra and Andrés Palacios.

== Plot summary ==
This story begins twenty-two years ago, when Cecilia, a young woman from a wealthy family, becomes pregnant. She is forced to abandon her daughter, by orders of her parents. After several days, Cecilia leaves her baby at the doors of an hacienda, thinking that her daughter will have a solved future.

However, it is not the owners of the hacienda who find Victoria, it is Chencha, the employee. She names the girl Victoria, thinking that her life will be full of victories, and raises her as her daughter. From an early age, Victoria has it clear that, although poor, she is meant to be a runner, and the love of the bold is never lacking, like the love of Andres, the son of the Santibáñez family, owners of the hacienda where Victoria lives.

Victoria begins a bitter period of her life after she is unjustly imprisoned at the age of fourteen in the local reformatory. Upon becoming a young adult, she is taken to prison. This was because of Gloria Santibáñez, mother of Andrés, who hates her. During these years, Victoria's only motivation was listening to Raúl de la Peña's radio program every night, which always has the most inspiring words and the best advice, in the midst of her sordid and dark reality.

In the meantime, Andrés has two goals. The first is to achieve Victoria's freedom, for which he studies law and graduates with honors. After this, he tries to achieve his second goal, and it is to gain Victoria's love.

Victoria is carried away by her feelings and marries Andres, but very soon realizes that she feels trapped again, because Gloria makes her life impossible. At that moment, she follows the beat of her heart and goes to Mexico City to pursue her dream, which is to become a professional athlete.

In the capital, Victoria meets Raul de la Peña, whom she had admired since she listened to his radio program in jail. Besides dedicating himself to the locution, Raúl is a doctor of the Olympic Committee, and it is right there that Victoria gets to work in the pursuit of her greatest desire. Raúl loves Victoria since he met her, and wants to take care of and protect her. Raúl is the same with Elsa, his daughter, who is actually his niece, but he loves her as if he were her father, because his brother gave her to him at a young age.

Andrés understands too late that Victoria is not a woman to have tied to an hacienda, since she has already lost many years of freedom. Andrés annuls their marriage after being taken over with jealousy and Victoria has the opportunity to make her life with Raul, who gives her his unconditional love and allows her to pursue her dreams. Victoria dedicates her entire soul to achieve her dream and finally arrives at the Olympics, where she obtains the highest merit for her country. However, her heart is puzzled, because she will have to decide if she returns with Andres or chooses to be happy with Raúl.

== Cast ==
=== Starring ===
- Paulina Goto as Victoria
- Andrés Palacios as Raúl de la Peña
- Mané de la Parra as Andrés Santibáñez

=== Also starring ===
- Jorge Aravena as Jorge
- Elizabeth Álvarez as Magdalena
- René Strickler as Clemente
- Susana Dosamantes as Gloria de Santibáñez
- Jorge Poza as Julio
- Verónika con K as Chencha
- Natalia Guerrero as Cecilia
- Helena Rojo as Maria Isabel

=== Recurring ===
- Juan Pablo Gil as Arturo
- Eva Cedeño as Cristina
- Gaby Mellado as Adriana
- Tania Lizardo as Usumacinta
- Isadora González as Mireya
- Rafael Amador as Padre Esteban
- Lizetta Romo
- Ana Lorena Elorduy as Elsa de la Peña
- Daniel Martinez as Emiliano
- Clarisa González as Elena Santibáñez
- Briggitte Bozzo as Ángela
- Lalo Palacios as Elías
- Guillermo Avilán
- Andres B. Durán
- Pía Sanz as Luz Clarita
- Susana González as Isadora
- Arturo Peniche as Braulio

== Production ==
=== Development ===
In February 2017, it was announced that the telenovela had been approved to begin writing, in development with Televisa. Production officially began on May 2, 2017. The series is written by Carlos Romero and produced by Nathalie Lartilleux.

=== Casting ===
Paulina Goto was cast as Victoria on March 3, 2017. followed by Mané de la Parra as Andrés, and Andrés Palacios as Raúl De la Peña. Pablo Montero had been chosen initially to interpret the character of Palacios, but due to problems with the production, he was dismissed from the project. Susana Dosamantes also had problems with the production so her participation was cut and is set to appear in a few episodes.

== Rating ==
Season	Timeslot (CT)	Episodes	First aired		Last aired	
Season	Timeslot (CT)	Episodes	Date	Premiere Ratings	Date	Finale Ratings
1	Mon–Fri 5:30pm	89	July 10, 2017	28.5	November 12, 2017	19.7

=== Episodes ===
No.	Title	Original release date
1	"Corre Victoria, corre"	July 10, 2017
Father Esteban calls his friend Clemente, who has trained the best athletes in the world. The father's intention is for Clemente to meet Victoria, since she has a special talent for running.
2	"Andrés le regresa su libertad a Victoria"	July 11, 2017
Andrés manages to help Victoria and gives her freedom. After spending years locked in, at last Victoria returns to run free for life and receives all the love of her mother Chencha.
3	"Victoria decide irse a la cuidad"	July 12, 2017
Victoria looks for Father Esteban to ask him to see Clemente see her run again and be able to train her professionally. Unfortunately Clemente is in the city and it is Victoria who should go with him.
4	"Andrés y Victoria se casan"	July 13, 2017
Andrés survives the shot he received and decides to ask Victoria again to marry him. This time she accepts and in a small ceremony inside the hospital, Andrés and Victoria become husband and wife.
5	"Cecilia y Victoria se encuentran"	July 14, 2017
Cecilia arrives at the town where she left her baby in the hope of finding a clue as to her whereabouts. Without waiting for it, Victoria crosses her path and manages to talk to her. Cecilia immediately feels a strong connection, but seeing her badly dressed, she doubts that she is her beloved daughter.
6	"Gloria corre a Victoria de su casa"	July 17, 2017
Gloria asks Cristina for help to break the relationship between Victoria and Andrés. Without hesitation, Cristina accepts and uses her great beauty to unleash Victoria's jealousy.
7	"Victoria conoce a Raúl de la Peña"	July 18, 2017
Victoria finally meets the man who helped her in her most difficult moments, Doctor Raúl de la Peña. As a dream come true, Victoria can talk with him and ask for wise advice like those she has heard on the radio for years.
8	"Raúl comienza a enamorarse de Victoria"	July 19, 2017
Raul's family notices the big smile he projects after meeting Victoria. Both Magdalena and Elsa believe that Raúl is in love. Similarly, Clemente realizes that Raúl has a great interest in Victoria and that he is not indifferent. Without imagining it, Raúl becomes excited again and realizes that Victoria could be that light that he needed so much, to see life with happiness.
9	"Andrés busca a Victoria en la ciudad"	July 20, 2017
Andrés decides to go and look for Victoria, but Cristina offers her help and ends up accompanying him. Upon reaching the city, Andrés meets Raúl and asks for information about Victoria.
10	"Victoria rechaza a Andrés para seguir su sueño"	July 21, 2017
Andres arrives at the sports club to try to recover Victoria, unfortunately she has already made a decision and rejects his proposal to return to town.
11	"Gloria anuncia su matrimonio con Julio"	July 24, 2017
Julio proposes marriage to Gloria and she accepts despite their great age difference. Julio tries to make sure that Elena gets rid of that child she has in her womb, so that she does not intervene in his plans.
12	"El padre Esteban pone en evidencia a Julio"	July 25, 2017
Elena confesses to Father Esteban that Julio asked her to get rid of the waiting son, since his plans have changed and now he intends to commit himself to Gloria.
13	"Raúl se atreve a confesarle su amor a Victoria"	July 26, 2017
Raul confesses to Victoria that his feelings towards her have changed, since in so little time he has managed to fill him with infinite happiness.
14	"Victoria y Andrés terminan su relación"	July 27, 2017
Guided by Clemente's advice, Victoria goes to town to talk to Andres and confess that another man kissed her. As expected, Andrés burns with jealousy and calls Victoria an opportunist. Without letting her explain anything, Andres ends his relationship with her.
15	"Victoria se reencuentra con Adriana"	July 28, 2017
Cecilia visits Andrés to give him the good news that she has found her daughter. The surprise is stronger for Victoria, since after a few months she returns to meet again with her great enemy Adriana.
16	"Andrés se divorcia y Elena se casa con Julio"	July 31, 2017
While Andres decides to end his marriage with Victoria, Elena marries secretly with Julio. On the one hand, Andres becomes a single man and Elena grants all the assets of the Santibáñez to the lawyer Montaño.
17	"Andrés y Raúl pelean por Victoria"	August 1, 2017
Andrés decides to face Dr. de la Peña to know his true intentions with Victoria. Raúl does not hesitate a second to confess that he loves Victoria and will not miss his opportunity, now that she is a free woman.
18	"La verdadera familia de Elsa"	August 2, 2017
Elsa receives a mysterious gift, which has a musical box and a photograph. When seeing the image, Raúl suffers when realizing that it is his brother and the mother of Elsa. With this test, Raul fears that the true parents of his little girl will come back and want to hurt her.
19	"El sueño de Victoria se apaga"	August 3, 2017
Elsa goes through a major crisis and manages to seriously hurt Victoria. Raúl knows that Victoria's diagnosis is serious and that her return to the track is very far away.
20	"Raúl opera a Victoria"	August 4, 2017
Hoping to run again, Victoria undergoes a complicated surgery and puts her life in the hands of Raul. The result may not be favorable, but Victoria has faith that she will soon return to the courts, to become a champion.
21	"Chencha tiene un tumor"	August 7, 2017
After several studies, Raúl and his colleagues discover why Chencha has fainted in recent days. Unfortunately Raúl must break the news to Victoria and informs her that her mother Chencha has a terrible tumor on her head.
22	"Luz Clarita se queda a vivir con Victoria"	August 8, 2017
Victoria's best friend arrives in the city ready to become a dancer. To achieve the first step, Arturo convinces Luz Clarita to perform her first audition and Victoria offers her home so that together they can support each other and achieve their dreams.
23	"Gloria muere"	August 9, 2017
Both Elena and Cristina attack Andres and make him feel guilty for the death of his mother. When remembering the threats of Julio, Andrés intends to find out the true reasons that caused the death of Gloria and swears that he will recover his things, thus avenging the surname Santibáñez.
24	"Magdalena es la madre de Elsa"	August 10, 2017
In order not to allow love between Raúl and Victoria, Magdalena dares to confess that she is Elsa's mother. In addition, Magdalena threatens Raul and asks him to end his relationship with Victoria or else, Elsa will know the whole truth about his family.
25	"Victoria se enfrenta a Adriana"	August 11, 2017
After the attack she suffered, Victoria decides to look for Adriana and confronts her without fear of anything. Cecilia arrives to defend her daughter and Victoria must deal with both. Victoria has the need to threaten them, to make it clear that she will not allow them to abuse her and want to harm her.
26	"Magdalena se atreve a besar a Raúl"	August 14, 2017
Magdalena dares to kiss Raúl and warns him that sooner or later he will fall into her. Raúl is angry and refuses to be manipulated, which is why he asks Magdalena to leave her house immediately and not make Elsa suffer any more.
27	"Adriana provoca el deseo de Jorge"	August 15, 2017
Adriana enters Jorge's room while he is completely naked and tries to seduce and provoke him, Jorge controls himself and removes Adriana from the room before anyone could see them. Adriana warns him that he will soon fall, knowing that he wants her as a woman.
28	"Cecilia arruina el triunfo de Victoria"	August 16, 2017
Victoria achieves her first triumph and receives the recognition of all for her great effort. But without waiting, Cecilia ruins the glorious moment, arguing that Victoria has no right to win, since she suffers from eating disorders.
29	"Raúl pide la mano de Victoria"	August 17, 2017
Victoria must leave the athletic tracks and the dream that began 22 years ago is interrupted by the hatred of Cecilia and Adriana. But Raúl is responsible for returning happiness asking for marriage, vowing never to face problems again alone.
30	"Victoria y Raúl se casan"	August 18, 2017
Victoria and Raul make their wedding vows in a beautiful scenario, surrounded by nature. Under the promise of staying together forever, Victoria and Raul unite their lives and give themselves to love.
31	"Elsa arruina la boda de Victoria"	August 21, 2017
Before beginning the wedding, Magdalena confesses to Elsa that Victoria is to blame for her unhappiness, since it is she who fell in love with Elías and because of her, he was locked up in jail. Without hearing explanations, Elsa attacks Victoria and ruins the wonderful moment of her wedding.
32	"Andrés se roba a Victoria"	August 22, 2017
After the uproar caused by Elsa, Victoria feels confused, since life has been very cruel to her, that is why to get rid of her problems, Andrés steals Victoria and takes her secretly to her village. The sudden disappearance of Victoria puts on alert Raul, who fears that his beloved is again in danger.
33	"El padre Esteban encuentra a la madre de Victoria"	August 23, 2017
Cecilia ends up in the village church and bemoans having so many doubts about her daughter. Seeing her suffer, Father Esteban approaches her and listens to her heartbreaking story, without imagining it, Cecilia reveals the necessary information so that Father Esteban comes to the conclusion that she is Victoria's true mother.
34	"Andrés se roba al bebé de Elena"	August 24, 2017
Andrés asks for Chencha's help to care for and raise his nephew, because without Elena, the baby will not have a mother figure that educates him and gives him much love. Chencha and Victoria agree to take care of the child, while Andrés and Santiago are arrested by the police, accused of kidnapping.
35	"Andrés está muerto"	August 25, 2017
Andrés and Julio suffer a spectacular accident just after a horse chase. Between the struggle, both fall into a deep ravine and the police fear that they have not survived. The news runs quickly and Victoria finds out that Andres is missing or maybe dead.
36	"Santiago rescata a Elena"	August 28, 2017
Santiago refuses to see his sister locked in the psychiatric clinic, so he mocks the security of the place and smuggles Elena out. Now that Andres is missing, Santiago has an obligation to help Elena, so she can recover her life and take care of her baby.
37	"Los celos invaden a Raúl"	August 29, 2017
Jealousy invades Raul and he can not help but feel anger when he sees Victoria still fond of Andres.
38	"Cecilia descubre la relación entre Jorge y Adriana"	August 30, 2017
Cecilia goes to the apartment where Jorge and Adriana are hidden and discover the infidelity of her husband. Cecilia for the impression, she suffers a faint and her health is seriously affected.
39	"Una nueva rival vence a Victoria"	August 31, 2017
Natalia a Cuban runner arrives to show that Victoria is not the best on the tracks. Besides stealing her title from the fastest, he wants to steal Raúl's heart.
40	"Arturo le pide matrimonio a Luz Clarita"	September 1, 2017
Arturo pleases Luz Clarita again and together they are parachuted, without a doubt one of the most terrifying experiences for Arturo, as he is afraid of heights. But the real surprise occurs when Arturo asks Luz Clarita for marriage.
41	"Elsa conoce a su padre y a su abuela"	September 4, 2017
The mother of Raul and Leonardo decide to go to Mexico City to get reacquainted. Upon arrival, they meet Elsa, who for the first time has the opportunity to meet the man who fathered her.
42	"Cecilia se entera que Victoria es su hija"	September 5, 2017
Cecilia is shocked after knowing that Victoria is the girl she has been looking for so much and to whom she needs to apologize. Raul tries to help her not to give up and try to get close to her, since her fights in the past could cause Cecilia never to receive the love of her daughter.
43	"María Isabel y Magdalena hacen un trato"	September 6, 2017
María Isabel proposes to Magdalena to make a deal to get Victoria out of the way and away from Raúl.
44	"Leonardo es engañado por Magdalena"	September 7, 2017
Magdalena plays with Leonardo's feelings and she lies to him when she says that Victoria is in love with him. Leonardo ingenuously believes her and intends to conquer her despite being the wife of his brother Raúl.
45	"María Isabel le declara la guerra a Victoria"	September 8, 2017
Because of Magdalena, María Isabel and Victoria begin a great discussion. It seems that Victoria has a new enemy at home.
46	"Chencha se acerca a Cecilia para ayudarla"	September 11, 2017
Chencha approaches Cecilia to offer her help and find a way to convince Victoria to accept meeting her mother. Cecilia is worried, because her illness may not give her the opportunity to receive her daughter's forgiveness and love. In addition, Cecilia fears that Maria Isabel can do much damage to Victoria.
47	"Cecilia le revela a Victoria que ella es su madre"	September 12, 2017
Cecilia, with the few strengths she has, tries to explain to Victoria the reasons that forced her to abandon her. Without being able to believe it, Victoria has no words to express what she feels and runs out.
48	"Raúl y Victoria discuten por culpa de María Isabel"	September 13, 2017
María Isabel provokes Victoria and manages to give her a big slap. Angered by the lack of respect his mother suffered, Raúl claims Victoria and asks her to behave as an adult and not to use violence.
49	"Victoria cae en la trampa de Magdalena"	September 14, 2017
Magdalena prepares a trap for Victoria and use Leonardo again to achieve her evil revenge. Victoria is quoted in the arenal, believing that Raúl would have a surprise for her, but in reality, Leonardo is the one waiting for her to be able to abuse her.
50	"Victoria es acusada de asesinato"	September 15, 2017
Victoria is accused of the murder of Leonardo and the police are looking for her, Chencha to protect her daughter, asks her to escape and does not return for a while until things are cleared or she will have to go to jail again.
51	"Andrés y Arturo deciden ayudar a Victoria"	September 18, 2017
Andrés and Arturo begin to devise a plan to demonstrate Victoria's innocence. When investigating the clues, Arturo discovers that Leonardo's death was caused by multiple blows to the head and Victoria denies having done so.
52	"Victoria pierde la confianza de Raúl"	September 21, 2017
Raúl thinks that Victoria is guilty of the death of his brother and therefore also believes that she was unfaithful. Victoria tries to talk to him to get him out of the mistake, so they set up an appointment to sneak around.
53	"El juicio de Victoria"	September 22, 2017
After a fight in court, the judge finally pronounces a judgment against Victoria. Before the accusations and the few tests, the judge decides to grant freedom to Victoria.
54	"Cecilia despierta"	September 25, 2017
Victoria decides to visit Cecilia again to ask for forgiveness and try to lead a relationship of mother and daughter. Meanwhile, Chencha does not stop telling stories to Cecilia so that soon she regains consciousness, unexpectedly she manages to open her eyes and wakes up from the coma.
55	"Cecilia y Victoria recuperan su relación de madre e hija"	September 26, 2017
Cecilia finally awakens from the coma and makes everyone very happy to return to their lives. Victoria takes advantage of the occasion and asks Cecilia for a new opportunity to start seeing herself as mother and daughter.
56	"Cecilia muere"	September 27, 2017
Victoria arrives with the hope of spending a nice day with her mother and receives the strong news of her death. Before dying, Cecilia made sure to protect her daughter and leaves her a great inheritance.
57	"Julio manda matar a Chencha"	September 28, 2017
Julio hires a person to hurt Chencha. In moments Chencha is attacked at high speed by a motorcycle and is severely injured. Before the police arrive at the place, Chencha learns that it was Julio who ordered her killed.
58	"Victoria sufre por la muerte de Chencha"	September 29, 2017
After the death of Cecilia, Victoria now lives the death of Chencha, she is disconsolate, because her two moms have left this world forever and there is nothing and no one who can take from her heart the great pain she feels, not even Raúl nor Andrés manages to give her the peace she so badly needs.
59	"Victoria decide seguir luchando por su felicidad"	October 2, 2017
Victoria dreams of her mother Chencha and asks for advice so she can move forward now that she is gone. Chencha encourages her to keep fighting and to achieve her dreams, since she will continue watching her and taking care of her from above.
60	"El secreto de Victoria"	October 3, 2017
Raúl meets Victoria's children and he questions her about the age of the children. Raul suspects that Alejandro is his son and demands that Victoria know the truth.
61	"Victoria le niega otra oportunidad a Raúl"	October 4, 2017
Raul wants to get another chance with Victoria, but his attempts are in vain, Victoria has changed too much and no longer believes in the words. Raúl's heart shatters when he sees that time has not only changed Victoria, it has destroyed his feelings.
62	"Victoria e Isadora se conocen"	October 5, 2017
Raúl, Isadora, Victoria and Andrés coincide in the same restaurant, when introducing themselves, Isadora rejoices and thanks Victoria for having given her the opportunity to meet Raúl, since he has changed his world completely.
63	"Magdalena demanda a Victoria"	October 6, 2017
A lawyer arrives at the Victoria office to notify her that Magdalena has filed a lawsuit against her for the mistreatment she received and the breach of the commercial agreement they had agreed upon.
64	"Victoria pierde a su hijo Alejandro"	October 9, 2017
The police speak with Victoria to inform him that the car with which Rafael escaped had a spectacular accident and caught fire completely. Victoria receives the news, is shocked and faints to believe that her son died.
65	"Victoria ingresa a una clínica psiquiátrica"	October 10, 2017
Raúl decides that it is correct to admit Victoria to a psychiatric clinic. While Magdalena leaves Alejandro abandoned in a home.
66	"Andrés y Raúl hacen una tregua para ayudar a Victoria"	October 11, 2017
Andrés and Raúl decide to make a truce and join to help Victoria. They both agree not to fight anymore for their love, until she is fully recovered and can choose whom to love.
67	"Maritza adopta al hijo de Victoria"	October 12, 2017
Maritza finally has little Alejandro in her arms and without knowing that he is Victoria's son, she decides to name him Sebastian. The emotion that Maritza has at that moment is indescribable, since for years she prayed to be a mother again.
68	"Raúl se entera del daño que hizo su madre"	October 13, 2017
Raul confronts his mother and demands that she dare to buy the shares of Victoria's company, just to annoy her. María Isabel justifies herself and makes him see that all her actions are for the purpose of protecting him, since, like her mother, she has the right to take care of him.
69	"Raúl comete un grave error frente a Victoria"	October 16, 2017
Maritza tries to heal Raul's wounds and asks him not to close himself to love. Maritza without thinking, dares to kiss Raul and in that precise moment Victoria, sees them.
70	"Adriana extorsiona a Victoria"	October 17, 2017
Adriana takes advantage of Victoria's pain and decides to send her anonymous messages to ask for money in exchange for information about the whereabouts of her son Alejandro. Victoria begins to believe that her son is alive and tries to find out who is trying to hurt her.
71	"Braulio conoce a Victoria"	October 18, 2017
Braulio appears in the Acevedo companies to meet his daughter, when he arrives he proposes Victoria to work together and help her with the lawsuit imposed by Magdalena. Without knowing that he is her father, Victoria senses that Braulio is a good person, who could help her a lot to deal with the bad streak that has happened in the company.
72	"Victoria descubre que Maritza tiene a su hijo"	October 19, 2017
Victoria meets Maritza and sees that Alejandro is with her. Without thinking, Victoria tries to hold her son, but Maritza stops her and runs away from there.
73	"Maritza acusa a Victoria de secuestro"	October 20, 2017
Maritza sued Victoria and accused her of child abduction. With great suffering, Maritza believes that everyone is against her, including Braulio, since he refuses to offer his help to recover Sebastian.
74	"Victoria y Alejandro corren peligro"	October 23, 2017
Victoria tries to leave the mountain to take her son to a hospital, in her attempt to reach the town, Victoria suffers an accident and gets hurt. Meanwhile, Raúl and Andrés are looking for a way to find her before the police and Maritza do it.
75	"Victoria y Andrés vuelven a estar juntos"	October 24, 2017
Victoria does not want to make the same mistake of letting go of love and decides to return her heart to Andrés.
76	"Milagros quiere todo con Andrés"	October 25, 2017
Milagros begins to bother Andres by offering more than her help, Luz Clarita perceives the intentions of Milagros and suspects that it can cause problems, affecting the relationship between Victoria and Andrés.
77	"Braulio somete a Magdalena"	October 26, 2017
Braulio investigates Magdalena's dirty past and subjects her to stop interfering in Victoria's life. The interest of Braulio to protect Victoria, disturbed Magdalena, so much that she suspects that he and Victoria are lovers.
78	"Julio busca hacer tratos con Braulio"	October 27, 2017
Julio looks for Braulio to ask for his help and together to destroy Victoria. Braulio's plan is to make friends with the enemy, so that Victoria can complete her revenge against Julio.
79	"La verdadera madre de Alejandro aparece"	October 30, 2017
Victoria looks for Tania, the real mother of Alejandro so that together they fight and they can avoid that Maritza stays with the custody of the baby. Without fear that everyone knows the truth, both Victoria and Tania decide to do everything to recover Alejandro.
80	"El juicio de Magdalena"	October 31, 2017
Magdalena is arrested for being involved in the kidnapping of Alejandro. With the tests that Victoria obtained, Andrés begins to fight so that Magdalena spends a long season locked up in jail.
81	"Maritza gana la custodia de Alejandro"	November 1, 2017
After hearing the testimony of Tania, the judge makes a decision and decides to grant Maritza Zavala definitive custody. Upon hearing the verdict, Victoria breaks into tears and kneels before Maritza to try to convince her to return her son.
82	"Victoria se entera que Braulio es su padre"	November 2, 2017
Braulio confesses to Victoria that he is her father and promises to replace all the years of his absence. Victoria lovingly accepts Braulio and presents him to everyone, as one more member of her family.
83	"Elsa se considera un monstruo"	November 3, 2017
After her first surgery, Elsa manages to see her face and breaks into tears when she notices in the mirror the reflection of a monster. Despite the words of Raúl, Victoria and Elías, the mark left by Julio Montaño managed to emotionally affect Elsa.
84	"Julio enamora a Maritza"	November 6, 2017
Julio finds Victoria's weak point and approaches Maritza to become romantically involved with her. Julio's plan is to be close to Victoria's son and thus be able to do as much damage as possible.
85	"Julio secuestra al hijo de Victoria"	November 7, 2017
Julio takes advantage of Maritza's ingenuity and kidnaps Alejandro and then asks Victoria for a large sum of money in exchange for her life. What Julio does not imagine is that Victoria has a plan, with which she intends to recover her son.
86	"Julio y Adriana ayudan a Magdalena"	November 8, 2017
Julio and Adriana help Magdalena so she can get out of jail. The police suspect that Adriana is protecting Magdalena and warn her that if she protects her, she will also be locked up for complicity.
87	"La vida de Victoria está en juego"	November 9, 2017
With the help of Magdalena, Julio kidnaps Victoria and decides to ask for a big ransom for her. Julio speaks directly with Andrés and puts him to the test, to find out how far he is willing to go to save the life of his beloved girlfriend Victoria.
88	"Adriana muere"	November 10, 2017
Julio tries to leave Magdalena and Adriana without protection. Adriana takes a gun and threatens him so that everyone gets part of the money he asked Victoria. Julio struggles with Adriana and unfortunately she is hurt.
89	"Victoria emprende el vuelo"	November 12, 2017
Raúl talks to Victoria to ask for her approval, as he plans to commit to Isadora. Raúl closes the cycle with Victoria and prepares his new life with the woman who made him change and believe in true love. Victoria wins her first race and obtains gold for Mexico. This triumph is dedicated to Chencha and shows us that dreams do come true.
