= Juan Pablo Gil =

Mexican actor

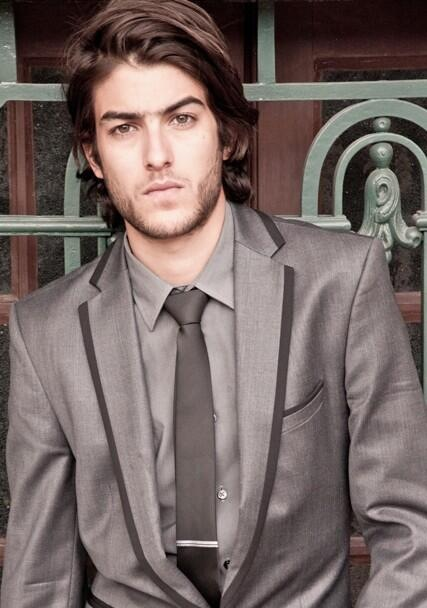
- Gil in 2013
- Born: Juan Pablo Gil Almada; November 16, 1989 (age 36); Culiacán, Sinaloa, Mexico
- Occupation: Actor
- Years active: 2010–present

Juan Pablo Gil Almada (born November 16, 1989), is a Mexican actor. He gained popularity for his role as "Charlie Noble" in the Warner Bros film, Nosotros los Nobles.

== Biography ==
Juan Pablo Gil Almada was born on November 16, 1989. He trained at Centro de Educación Artística, Televisa's acting school. His acting career started in 2010 when he joined the cast of the stage production, Todo sobre mi madre, which premiered at the "Teatro de los Insurgentes". He shared credits with Ana Claudia Talancón, Margarita Gralia, Lisa Owen. Due to the play's success, it toured the major cities in Mexico.

== Filmography ==
=== Film roles ===
Year	Title	Roles	Notes
2011	Malaventura	Nicolás	
2013	Nosotros los Nobles	Charlie Noble	
2013	Amor a primera vista	Manolo	
2019	Loco fin de semana	El Príncipe	

=== Television roles ===
Year	Title	Roles	Notes
2011–2013	La rosa de Guadalupe	Various roles	5 episodes
2012–2018	Como dice el dicho	Daniel Isaac Unknown role	Episode: "El que se fue a la villa" Episode: "Más vale poco y bien allegado" Episode: "Quien oye y calla, consiente"
2014–2015	Mi corazón es tuyo	León	Recurring role; 175 episodes
2015–2016	A que no me dejas	Alan	Recurring role (part 2); 64 episodes
2016	Por siempre Joan Sebastian	Rodrigo Figueroa González	Recurring role; 10 episodes
2016	Las amazonas	Emiliano	Recurring role; 61 episodes
2017	El vuelo de la victoria	Arturo	Recurring role; 53 episodes
2018–2019	Las Buchonas	Luciano	Recurring role; 16 episodes
2019–2020	El Dragón: Return of a Warrior	Jorge Garza	Main role (season 1); 36 episodes
2019	Decisiones: Unos ganan, otros pierden	Federico Lombardi	Episode: "La venganza"
2020	Como tú no hay 2	Adán Orozco Campos	Main cast
2021	Si nos dejan	Francisco	Recurring role
2022	La herencia	Lucas del Monte	
2024	El ángel de Aurora	Edgar Bautista	
2025	Me atrevo a amarte	Gabino Mendoza García	
2026	Corazón de oro	Dante	

== Awards and nominations ==
Year	Award	Category	Recipient	Result
2014	Premios Canacine	Promesa Masculina del año (Most promising Male Actor)	Nosotros los Nobles	Won
2015	TVyNovelas Awards	Best Young Actor	Mi corazón es tuyo	Nominated
2017	TVyNovelas Awards	Best Young Actor	Las amazonas	Nominated
