= Claudia Álvarez =

Mexican actress

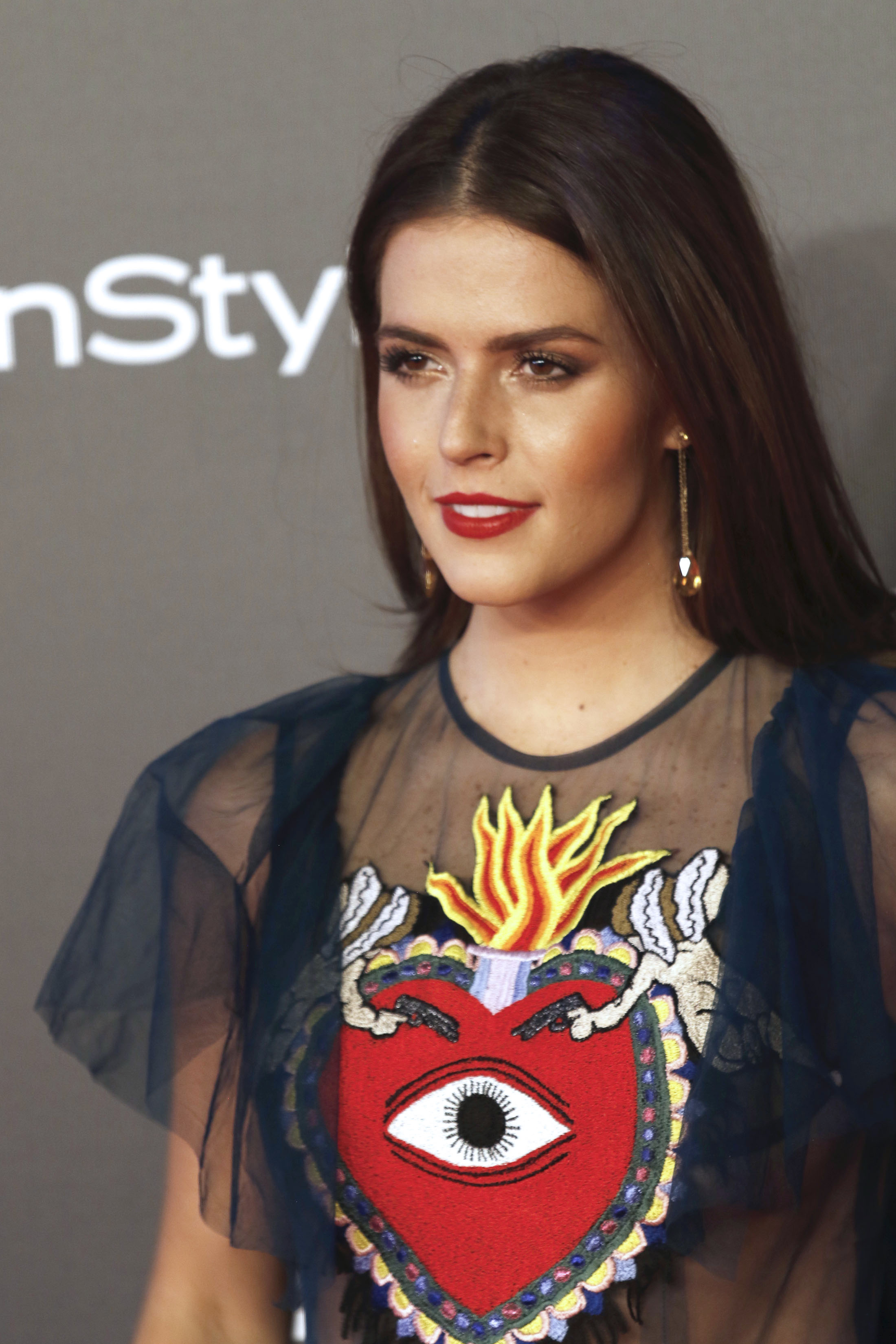
- Álvarez in 2017
- Born: Claudia Álvarez Ocampo; October 6, 1981 (age 44); Mexico City, México
- Occupation: Actress
- Years active: 2004–present

Claudia Álvarez (Spanish pronunciation: [ˈklawðja ˈalβaɾes]; born Claudia Álvarez Ocampo, October 6, 1981) is a Mexican actress. Her debut was in 2004 on the soap opera Las Juanas in the role Juana Prudencia.

== Career ==
Claudia Alvarez began her career in television commercials in 1995, at the age of 13, soon after I file a Spanish company as an event, later went to college where she studied Advertising. Shortly after Claudia left her advertising degree to dedicate herself to acting. Her roles were in the Mexican telenovela TV Azteca, Las Juanas where she gave life to one of the Juanas' Juana Prudencia, "so that became part of the CEFAC.

After that she played Sofia in the soap opera and TV Azteca and Canal Caracol Amores Cruzados credits with Colombian actress Ana Lucia Dominguez and Patricia Vásquez, with partner Claudia Michell Gurfi starring as the villain along with Colombian actress Andrea López. She was part of telenovelas are looking for a man, and Pobre Diabla untamed beauty in the latter played the villain Santa stellar production starring Alejandra Lazcano.

In 2010 entered the ranks of Televisa which assumed interpret a main character in La Fuerza del Destino of Rosy Ocampo, but not anything specific, just after she was called by Pedro Torres that will join the cast of El Equipo. In 2011, in the hands of Emilio Larrosa will play an important character in the telenovela of Televisa Dos Hogares sharing credits with Anahí and Carlos Ponce. She starred as Veronica, the main female antagonist, in the 2012 telenovela by Juan Osorio, Porque el amor manda which starred Fernando Colunga and Blanca Soto.

== Filmography ==
=== Film ===
Title	Year	Role	Notes
No sé si cortarme las venas o dejármelas largas	2013	Ana	
Boccaccerías Habaneras	2014	Catalina	

=== Television roles ===
Title	Year	Role	Notes
Un nuevo amor	2003	Cecilia Iturralde Méndez	
Mirada de mujer, el regreso	2003	Luciana	
Las Juanas	2004	Juana Prudencia	Main role; 180 episodes
Cada mañana	2005	Herself	Television host
Amores cruzados	2006	Sofía Narváez Echeverría	Main cast; 70 episodes
Bellezas indomables	2007	María Fernanda Urquillo	Main cast; 180 episodes
Se busca un hombre	2007	Loreto Reigadas	Main cast; 260 episodes
Pobre Diabla	2009	Santa / Sandra Ortigoza	Main cast; 195 episodes
Madrid DF	2010	Julieta	Episode: "Julieta se va para siempre"
El Equipo	2011	Pilar	Recurring role; 11 episodes
Dos hogares	2011–2012	Adela Arismendi	Recurring role; 132 episodes
Porque el amor manda	2012–2013	Verónica Hierro	Main cast; 182 episodes
Hasta el fin del mundo	2014–2015	Alexa Ripoll Bandy	Main role; 186 episodes
Simplemente María	2015–2016	María Flores Ríos	Main role; 126 episodes
En tierras salvajes	2017	Isabel Montalbán	Main role; 70 episodes
Vencer el desamor	2020-2021	Ariadna López Hernández	Main role; 93 episodes
Vencer el pasado	2021	Ariadna López Hernández	Guest star; 1 episode
Mi camino es amarte	2022	Olivia Lugo	Guest star; 2 episodes
Un buen divorcio	2024	Mónica	Main role

== Awards and nominations ==
Year	Award	Category	Telenovela	Result
2012	TVyNovelas Awards	Best Young Lead Actress	Dos Hogares	Nominated
2013	Premios People en Español	Best Female Antagonist	Porque el amor manda	Nominated
2014	TVyNovelas Awards	Best Female Antagonist	Porque el amor manda	Nominated
2017	TVyNovelas Awards	Best Actress	Simplemente María	Nominated
