= Alejandra Buitrago =

Colombian actor

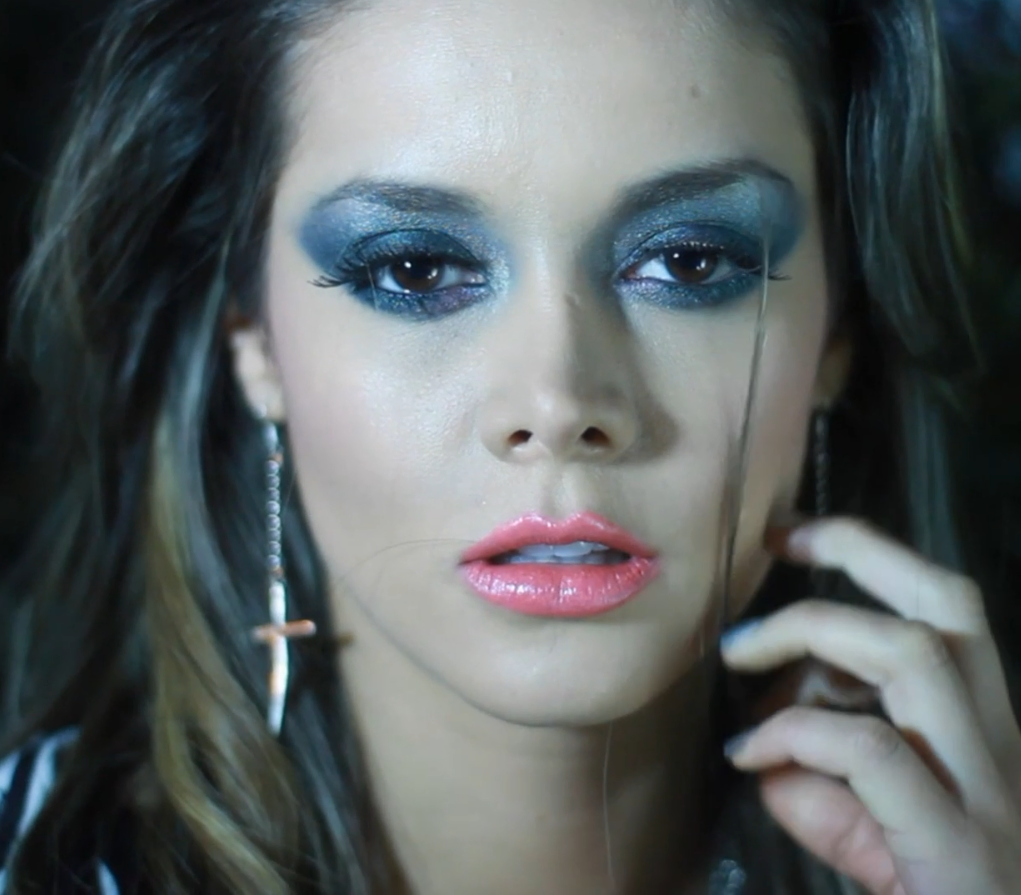
- Born: 9 October 1987 (age 39); Pereira Colombia
- Occupations: Television presenter and Model

Alejandra Buitrago Herrera is a Colombian model and television presenter. She is known for having participated in the sports program Fuera de lugar, in the show program El lavadero, and in the variety program Nuestra semana, nuestra televisión on RCN Televisión. As a model, she has appeared in Colombian publications such as TVyNovelas, Vea, Don Juan, SoHo, and GENTE, among others. Since 2016 she has been working on the Tu voz estéreo series until 12 July 2019 on Caracol Televisión . In 2019, she made her film debut in the Mario Ribero film La branch.

== Career ==
She began her studies in Administration and Finance, before enrolling in an acting workshop. Later, she was part of the cast of the program El Lavadero, hosted by Graciela Torres and also broadcast by RCN. She did not move from the channel to later arrive at Nuestra semana, nuestra tele, replacing Jéssica Cediel and staying there for a year.

In the latter, Buitrago demonstrated her skills as an actress playing La Felina, a parody of La gata, a Mexican telenovela that was broadcast by RCN. When asked if she had been offered roles in soap operas or series, Alejandra was honest and said yes, but clarifying that she still does not dare to take that step because she first wanted to train and study acting.

After serving as a reporter at the 2014 Soccer World Cup, Buitrago gained worldwide popularity due to her beauty. She was ranked as one of the "Hottest Women of the 2014 World Cup" by various websites, including COED, Busted Coverage, Daily News, and more. Additionally, several different groups have called her "the sexiest fan of the Colombian team."

She is also known because on one occasion in which she was interviewed asking her who her favorite player was, she replied that it was Lionel Messi because he was Colombian (this being Argentine ), which aroused all kinds of ridicule and insults against her.

From 2016 to 2019, she joined the cast of the Canal Caracol series Tu voz estéreo (playing Laura), along with Lucas Buelvas.

== Filmography ==
=== Presenter ===
Year	Qualification	Role	Channel
2014-2015	Our Week, Our TV	Presenter	RCN Channel
2012-2014	The Laundry Room	Presenter	RCN Channel
2011-2014	Out of Place	Presenter	RCN Channel

== Television ==
Year	Title	Character	Network
2016-2019	Tu Voz Estereo	Laura	Caracol Televisión
