= Andrés Palacios =

Mexican actor (born 1975)

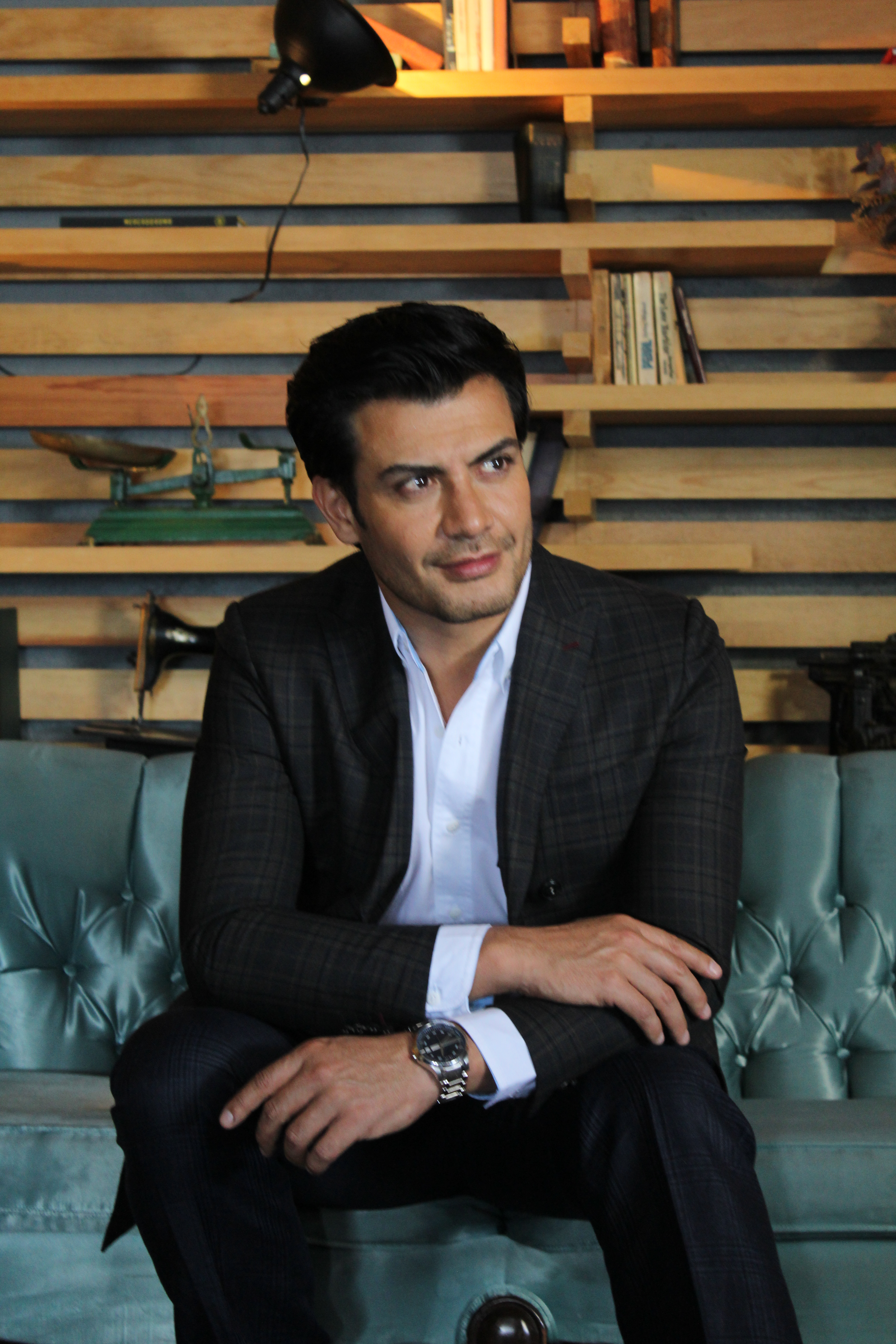
- Born: 13 May 1975 (age 51); Santiago, Chile
- Occupation: Actor
- Years active: 2000–present

Andrés Palacios (born 13 May 1975) is a Chilean-born Mexican actor.

== Biography ==
Palacios was born in Chile, but moved to Mexico when he was two years old. He had participated in various theatrical shows and telenovelas.

== Filmography ==
=== Film ===
Year	Title	Role	Notes
2010	Sucedió en un día	Desconocido	Segment: "Amor a primera vista"
2010	Hidalgo	Morelos	
2020	El club de los idealistas	Orlando	

=== Television ===
Year	Title	Role	Notes
2000	El amor no es como lo pintan	Jaime Galán Valdés	
2002	La duda	Chimino	
2002	El País de las mujeres	Unknown role	
2004	Las Juanas	Juan Álvaro	Main role
2004	Belinda	Jesús Infante	
2005	Amor en custodia	Nicolás Pacheco	Main role
2007	Mientras haya vida	Sergio Juárez	
2008	Noche eterna	Darío Franco	
2008	Deseo prohibido	Nicolás	
2009	Eternamente tuya	Juan Pablo Tovar	
2010	Vidas robadas	Martin Sandoval	Main role
2010	Capadocia	Gabo	Episode: "La sal de la tierra"
2011	Cielo rojo	Natán Garcés	
2012	Amor cautivo	Javier del Valle	
2013	Fortuna	Gabriel Altamirano Ledesma	Main role
2014	Camelia la Texana	Teniente Facundo García	Main role
2014	Señora Acero	Eliodoro Flores Tarso	Main role (season 1); 44 episodes
2016	Hasta que te conocí	Daniel Mijares	3 episodes
2016	Las amazonas	Alejandro San Román	Main role
2017	El Bienamado	Homero Fuentes	Main role
2017	El vuelo de la victoria	Raúl de la Peña	Main role
2017	Érase una vez	Vidal	Episode: "Caperucita Roja"
2018	Tenías que ser tú	Miguel "Miky" Carreto	Main role
2019	La usurpadora	Carlos Bernal	Main role
2020	Imperio de mentiras	Leonardo Velasco	Main role
2022	Amor dividido	Bruno García	Main role
2022	La madrastra	Esteban Lombardo	Main role
2023	Tierra de esperanza	Santos Sandoval	Main role
2024	Amor amargo	Tomás Jiménez	Main role
2025	Mi verdad oculta	Zacarías Castillo Pérez	Main role
2026	El precio de la fama	Germán Vela	Main cast

== Awards and nominations ==
Year	Award	Category	Works	Result
2006	Bravo Awards	Best Male Revelation	Amor en custodia	Won
2014	People en Español Awards	Hottie of the Year	Señora Acero	Nominated
2015	Tu Mundo Awards	Favorite Lead Actor: Series	Señora Acero	Nominated
2017	Premios TVyNovelas	Best Actor	Las amazonas	Nominated
