= Salvador Mejía =

Mexican producer and director (born 1961)

Salvador Mejía Alejandre
- Born: Salvador Mejía Alejandre; February 12, 1961 (age 65); Toluca, Mexico
- Occupations: Producer, director
- Years active: 1984-present
- Spouse: Nathalie Lartilleux

Salvador Mejía Alejandre (born February 12, 1961, in Toluca, State of Mexico, Mexico) is a Mexican producer and director.

== Personal life ==
He is married with fellow producer Nathalie Lartilleux, his former associate producer on his first telenovelas.

== Filmography ==
Year	Title	Credited as		
Year	Title	Production manager	Executive producer	Associate producer
1984	Principessa	Yes		
1989	Simplemente María			Yes
1991	La pícara soñadora			Yes
1992	María Mercedes			Yes
1997	Esmeralda		Yes	
1998	La usurpadora		Yes	
1998	Más allá de... La usurpadora		Yes	
1999	Rosalinda		Yes	
2000–2001	Abrázame muy fuerte		Yes	
2002	Entre el amor y el odio		Yes	
2003–2004	Mariana de la Noche		Yes	
2005	La Madrastra		Yes	
2005	La Madrastra: Años Después		Yes	
2005	La esposa virgen		Yes	
2006–2007	Mundo de fieras		Yes	
2008	Fuego en la sangre		Yes	
2009–2010	Corazón salvaje		Yes	
2010–2011	Triunfo del amor		Yes	
2012–2013	Qué bonito amor		Yes	
2013	La Tempestad		Yes	
2015	Lo imperdonable		Yes	
2016	Las amazonas		Yes	
2017	En tierras salvajes		Yes	
2022	Corazón guerrero		Yes	
2024	Vivir de amor		Yes	
2025	Me atrevo a amarte		Yes	
2026	Infinito amor		Yes	

== Awards and nominations ==
=== Premios TVyNovelas ===
Year	Category	Telenovela	Result
1998	Best Telenovela of the Year	Esmeralda	Won
1999	Best Telenovela of the Year	Más allá de... La usurpadora	Nominated
2001	Best Telenovela of the Year	Abrázame muy fuerte	Won
2002	Best Telenovela of the Year	Entre el amor y el odio	Nominated
2004	Best Telenovela of the Year	Mariana de la Noche	Nominated
2006	Best Telenovela of the Year	La esposa virgen	Nominated
2006	Best Telenovela of the Year	La Madrastra	Nominated
2007	Best Telenovela of the Year	Mundo de fieras	Nominated
2009	Best Telenovela of the Year	Fuego en la sangre	Won
2010	Best Telenovela of the Year	Corazón salvaje	Nominated
2012	Best Telenovela of the Year	Triunfo del amor	Nominated
