= Alejandro Estrada =

Primatologist and author

Alejandro Estrada is a primatologist and the author and editor of several books and articles about primates. He is a research scientist at the field research station Los Tuxtlas of Universidad Nacional Autonoma de Mexico He was the founder and executive editor of Tropical Conservation Science. Books he has authored or edited include New Perspectives in the Study of Mesoamerican Primates: Distribution, Ecology, Behavior, and Conservation (Developments in Primatology: Progress and Prospects), Frugivores and Seed Dispersal: Ecological and Evolutionary Aspects , Las Selvas Tropicales Humedas de Mexico: Recurso Poderoso pero Vulnerable and Comportamiento Animal: el Caso de los Primates.

His most recent article published in 2017 in the journal Science Advances, Impending extinction of the Worlds primates: Why primates matter, is a ground-breaking call for conservation of the world's primates. A related set of publications between 2018 and 2024 further examine the impact of global trade of commodities on primate conservation and global aspects of socioeconomic and human development and primate conservation. (see below).

Dr. Alejandro Estrada received his Ph.D. in Primatology from Rutgers University in 1978.

== Special projects ==
- Global and regional patterns of primate conservation
- Long-term studies of population, gene flow and genetic relatedness and habitat navigation and use of food resources by black howler monkey (Alouatta pigra) in southeast Mexico (www.aestradaprimates.com).
- Rescue and rehabilitation of primates from the pet trade in Mexico.

== Selected publications ==
Estrada A, Garber PA, Chaudhary A. 2020. Current and future trends in socio-economic, demographic and governance factors affecting global primate Conservation. PeerJ 8:e9816 doi.org/10.7717/peerj.9816

Klass, K., Campos Villanueva, D.A, Mercado Malabet, F., Van Belle, S., Estrada, A. 2020. Differential landscape effects on male and female black howler monkeys in forest fragments around Palenque National Park, Chiapas, Mexico. PeerJ. DOI 10.7717/peerj.9694

Klass K, Van Belle S, Estrada A. 2020. Demographic population structure of black howler monkeys in fragmented and continuous forest in Chiapas, Mexico: Implications for conservation. American Journal of Primatology. doi.org/10.1002/ajp.23163

Alejandro Estrada, Paul A. Garber, Abhishek Chaudhary. 2019. Expanding global commodities trade and consumption place the world's primates at risk of extinction. PeerJ. DOI 10.7717/peerj.7068.

Van Belle Sarie, Estrada Alejandro. 2019. The influence of loud calls on intergroup spacing mechanism in black howler monkeys (Alouatta pigra). International Journal of Primatology. doi.org/10.1007/s10764-019-00121-x

De Guinea, M., Estrada, A., Nekaris, K.A.I, & Van Belle, S. 2019. Arboreal route navigation in a Neotropical mammal: energetic implications associated with tree monitoring and landscape attributes. Movement Ecology. 7:39 doi.org/10.1186/s40462-019-0187-z

Baoguo Li, Ming Li, Jinhua Li, Pengfei Fan, Qingyong Ni, Jiqi Lu, Xuming Zhou, Yongcheng Long, Weihua Xu, Zhigang Jiang, Peng Zhang, Zhipang Huang, Ruliang Pan, Sidney Gouveia, Ricardo Dobrovolski, Cyril C. Grueter, Charles Oxnard, Colin Groves, Alejandro Estrada, Sidney Gouveia, Ricardo Dobrovolski, and Paul A. Garber. 2018. The Primate Extinction Crisis in China: Immediate Challenges and A Way Forward. Biodiversity and Conservation. doi.org/10.1007/s10531-018-1614-y

Alejandro Estrada, Paul A. Garber, Russell A. Mittermeier, Serge Wich, Sidney Gouveia, Ricardo Dobrovilski, K. Anne-Isola Nekaris, Vincent Nijman, Anthony B. Rylands, Fiona Maisels, Elizabeth A. Williamson, Julio Cesar Bicca-Marques, Agustin Fuentes, Leandro Jerusalinsky, Steig Johnson, Fabiano Rodriguez de Melo, Leonardo Oliveira, Christoph Schwitzer, Christian Roos, Susan M. Cheyne, Maria Cecília Martins Kierulff, Brigitte Raharivololona, Maurício Talebi, Jonah Ratsimbazafy, Jatna Supriatna, Ramesh Boonratana, Made Wedana, Arif Setiawan. 2018. Primates in peril: the significance of Brazil, Madagascar, Indonesia and the Democratic Republic of the Congo for global primate conservation. PeerJ. DOI 10.7717/peerj.4869

Estrada, A., Paul A. Garber, Anthony B. Rylands, Christian Roos, Eduardo Fernandez-Duque, Anthony Di Fiore, K. Anne-Isola Nekaris, Vincent Nijman, Eckhard W. Heymann, Joanna E. Lambert, Francesco Rovero, Claudia Barelli, Joanna M. Setchell, Thomas R. Gillespie, Russell A. Mittermeier, Luis Verde Arregoitia, Miguel de Guinea, Sidney Gouveia, Ricardo Dobrovolski, Sam Shanee, Noga Shanee, Sarah A. Boyle, Agustin Fuentes, Katherine C. MacKinnon, Katherine R. Amato, Andreas L. S. Meyer, Serge Wich, Robert W. Sussman, Ruliang Pan, Inza Kone, Baoguo Li. 2017. Impending extinction crisis of the world's primates: why primates matter. Science Advances. 3: e1600946 3: e1600946.
