= Las Juanas (Colombian TV series) =

Colombian telenovela

Las Juanas is a Colombian telenovela. It first aired in 1997 on the Colombian Network RCN. The show was written by Bernardo Romero Pereira, and was his most successful telenovela after the globally distributed series Café and Yo Soy Betty, La Fea.

== Story ==
Las Juanas follows an interesting storyline because it can be easily split into several stages that almost follow different plots. These "chapters" in which the telenovela is split makes one think this story as a book-telenovela because in every stage the plot follows a different goal and once it is reached it changes to another goal to be reached.

=== Looking for Calixto Salguero's daughters ===
The telenovela begins when Juana Valentina Echenique (Angie Cepeda) finds out the man she always thought to be her father, Gonzalo Echenique, really is not, but a man named Calixto, who lives in a rural small town named Corozal. Juana Valentina and her nanny - Teresalsura - travel to Corozal from their hometown Barranquilla looking for the man who is her father. There she meets Rubén, a charming young man who has an instant chemistry with her. But it turns out that Ruben's father is named Calixto, so he may be her father. Juana Valentina begs not to be Ruben's half-sister, but when she interviews Ruben's parents asking if Calixto has a fish-shaped spot in his buttock, when Calixto's wife hears this, she reacts very badly but confirming to Juana Valentina she's Calixto's natural daughter and so Ruben's half-sister. Calixto (Pepe Sanchez), who is very scared after being reached by a thunder and still being alive and healthy, decides to find out the women he had been with 23 years ago when ironically he was trying to have a child with his wife, Doña (Judy Henriquez). Juana Valentina agrees to stay until finding if she has more siblings, so Juana Valentina, Ruben, Calixto and Calixto's best friend Judge Guerra starts a journey all along the Colombian Caribbean to find those women and potential siblings for Juana Valentina and Ruben.

The first place they go to visit is Planeta Rica, where they find Juana Caridad (Catherine Siachoque) who is now a novice in a nuns convent, after Juana Caridad learns she has a family, she decides to leave the convent and join Juana Valentina. Later they go to another town Sahagún, where they meets an old friend of Doña, Margarita Cruz who is actually the mother of another daughter for Calixto Salguero, Juana Manny, a boxing apprentice, but the reason why Juana Manny decides to join her new family is very different from Juana Caridad, because Manny is just looking for the money Calixto can provides to her. Next station for the Salgueros is El Carmen de Bolivar, where they find another daughter of Calixto, Juana Bautista, a fortune teller. The last daughter of Calixto was the hardest to find, but because they were looking for her in Santa Marta, while the girl, Juana Matilde is actually in Corozal and he was discovered for the fish-shaped spot in her buttock.

The five girls all named Juana start to receive gifts and money from Calixto, for much of Doña's dismay, who develops a deep feeling of hate toward the five girls. Juana Valentina and Ruben are obviously attracted to each other, despite the fact they're siblings. Ruben's cousin Manuel Efe (Miguel Varoni) also has a crush on Juana Valentina and Ruben is always mad at him for being interested on his sister but also for his comic-derogatory behavior for the country because he is just coming to Colombia after years in Europe.

This chapter concludes when Juana Valentina cancels her plans to go back to Barranquilla because Calixto loses all his money for a total failure in the cultivations, so her sisters and father need her.

=== Bingo ===
After the Salgueros's bankruptcy, Juana Valentina decides to stay in Corozal to help in the situation, so she and her sisters - who now live in Doña's parents' house named "La Casa Rosada" or The Pink House - decide to support their house and Doña's house while Ruben and Calixto put all the money and efforts to get the farm out of the ruin. The lack of job chances lead the Juanas to be very creative in their attempts to get money, so their first idea is a bingo.

But ironically Doña - who has been receiving money from the Juanas without notice - with the help of her nephew Manuel Efe is take this idea down making people believe that the Juanas are cheating on them. In this point all the girls seem to have a love interest in the guys from Corozal. Juana Caridad dates Mauricio Fuentelafria, son of important politician, who used to have a crush on Juana Valentina but who after watching Juana Caridad almost naked and being charmed by the innocence of the girl decides to keep a relationship with her, but her very religious condition makes this a little bit harder for Mauricio. Juana Manny dates Octavio Portorreal. The explosive personality of Juana Manny makes Octavio to reconsider their relationship, but he, like Mauricio, gets to understand Juana Manny and keeps a stable relationship with the boxing girl. Juana Matilde starts to date Miguel Tejeros, and they begin a relationship but Juana Matilde's freedom makes Miguel believe that if he keeps a relationship with her, Juana Matilde eventually is pushing him away from her in order to keep her freedom, but it does not happen. Miguel's mother, the closest friend of Doña, decides to leave him without money, that way he can not help the girls.

Once people think the Juanas is cheating on them, a big fight starts and the guys takes the girls out of the bingo-house, saving them from being hurt.

== Main cast ==
- Angie Cepeda - Juana Valentina Echenique/Salguero
- Rafael Novoa - Juan Rubén Calixto Salguero Cuadrado
- Catherine Siachoque - Juana Caridad Galante/Salguero
- Carolina Sabino - Juana Matilde Estañíz/Salguero
- Xilena Aycardi - Juana Manny Cruz/Salguero
- Susana Torres - Juana Bautista Cordero/Salguero
- Judy Henríquez - Doña Cuadrado Valencia de Salguero (Doña Doña)
- Pepe Sánchez † - Calixto Salguero
- Iván Rodríguez - Jeremías Guerra
- Miguel Varoni - Manuel Efe Cuadrado
- Mile - Teresalsura
- Fernando Villate - Egidio "Todo el Mundo"
- Jennifer Steffens - Rosaura Cárdenas
- Astrid Junguito - Margarita Cruz
- Katherine Vélez - Yolanda ex de Cabrales
- Evelyn Santos - María Delia Espina
- Jorge Cárdenas - Octavio Portorreal
- Freddy Flórez - Poncho Sarmiento
- Orlando Lamboglia - Mauricio Fuentelafría
- Alfonso Peña - Gualberto
- Nicolás Tovar - Miguel Tejero
- Juan Mario de la Espriella - Lázaro
- Miguel Oliver Blanco - "El Diablo"
- Rafael Cardoso - Orlando Angulo "El Hombre Lobo"
- Herbert King - "Pupo"
- Miguel Oliver Blanco - "El Diablo"
- Miguel 'El Happy' Lora - himself

== International broadcasters of Las Juanas (1997) ==
=== Africa ===
- Cameroon:
- Ghana:
- South Africa: SABC
- Angola:

=== Americas ===
- Brazil:
- Argentina: El Trece (1997-1998) / Magazine
- Bolivia: Unitel
- Chile: TVN
- Colombia: RCN Telenovelas
- Ecuador: Gama TV
- United States: Telemundo (1998)
- Mexico: TV Azteca and Televisa
- Paraguay: Telefuturo (1997-1998) / Paravisión (2000-2001) / Tigo SAT Network
- Peru: ATV / Panamericana Televisión
- Uruguay: Teledoce (1997-1998) / VTV Plus
- Venezuela: RCTV
- Dominican Republic: Tele Antillas

=== Asia & Oceania ===
- Australia:
- Fiji:
- New Zealand:
- South Korea:
- China:
- Japan:

=== Europe ===
- Israel:
- Spain:
- Portugal:
- United Kingdom
- Italy: Rai Due
