= Mr Model México =

National male beauty pageant competition in Mexico

Mr Model Mexico SA de CV
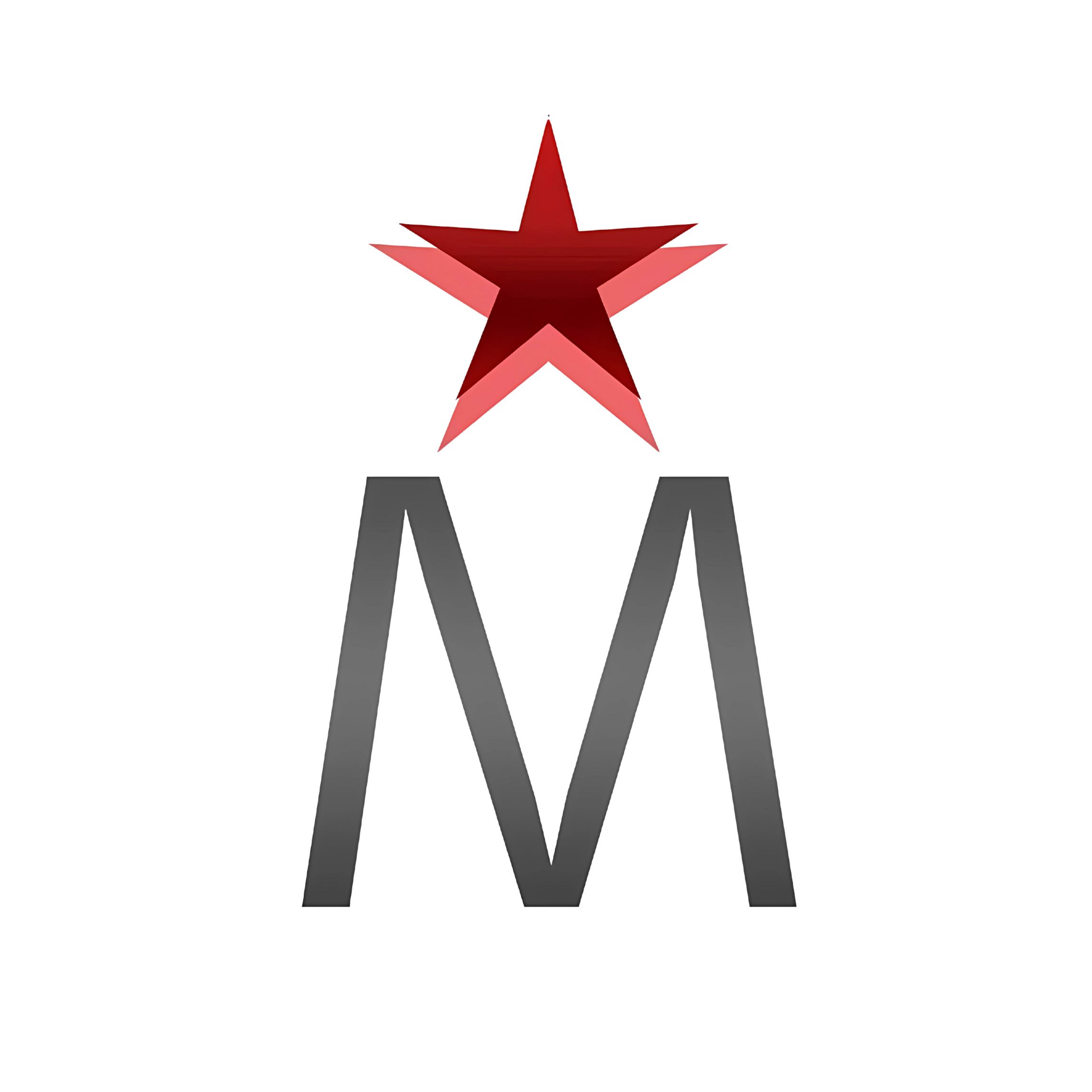
- Formation: 2010; 16 years ago
- Type: Male pageant
- Headquarters: Mexico City
- Location: Mexico
- Members: Mister International; Mister Global; Manhunt International
- Official language: Spanish
- President: Oscar Servin

Mr Model México is an annual male beauty pageant aimed for men throughout Mexico who meet the necessary qualities to best represent the country at an international level.

== History ==
Founded in 2010 by Óscar Servin, the organization seeks to instill values and awareness in the nation's youth by promoting a healthy physical and social lifestyle. The contest brings together participants from all over the country, including Mexican men who represent their community abroad.

The national competition is held uninterruptedly since 2011 and is responsible for selecting the country's delegates. The winner and finalists may compete in renowned pageants like Mister International, Mister Global and Manhunt International, alongside several other prominent regional events.

Rafael Chávez win as Mr Universe Model 2013 marks Mexico's first international title under the Mr Model México organization. In 2026, It was followed by Andrés Briseño clinched Mexico's first Mister International title.

== Titleholders ==
The winner of Mr Model México represents his country at Mister International or Mister Global. On occasion, when the winner does not qualify for either contest, a runner-up is sent.

Mr Model México
2011	Sérgio Felipe Meléndez Rebollo	2012	Hans Jael Valdez Briseño	2013	Alejandro Villanueva Valencia	2014	Alejandro Ruíz Nevárez	2015	Manoly Sadam Díaz Arango
2016	Ramón Armando Osuna López	2017	Pedro Molina Renero	2018	Jorge Andrés Villegas Ramón	2019	Gabriel Alejandro Ortiz Aguayo	2022	José Ángel Mora Garciglia
2023	Brian Eduardo Ceballos Muñoz	2024	Brian Arturo Faugier González	2025	Gabriel Alejandro Silva Saucedo	2026	Andrés Briseño Briseño		

== Mr Model México Representatives ==
Color key

- : Declared as Winner
- : Ended as Runner-up
- : Ended as one of the Finalist/Semi-finalists

=== Mister International ===
Year	Mister International Mexico	State	Competition performance		Ref.
Year	Mister International Mexico	State	Placements	Special award(s)	Ref.
(Thailand) 2026	Andrés Briseño Briseño	Sinaloa	Mister International 2026		
(Thailand) 2025	Guillermo Inurreta Del Cueto	Veracruz	Top 10		
(Thailand) 2024	Brian Arturo Faugier González	Nuevo León	Top 10		
(Thailand) 2023	Brian Eduardo Ceballos Muñoz	Ciudad de México	Top 20	Most Charisma Men	
(Philippines) 2022	Jorge Andrés Villegas Ramón	Estado de México	Top 10		
Due to the impact of COVID-19 pandemic, no competition held between 2019―2021
(Philippines) 2018	Piero Molina Renero	Puebla	Unplaced		
(Myanmar) 2017	Ramón Armando Osuna López	Sinaloa	Top 16	Fan Vote Choicely	
(Thailand) 2016	Manoly Sadam Díaz Arango	Puebla	Top 16		
(Philippines) 2015	Alejandro Ruíz Nevárez	Sinaloa	Top 16	Mister Photogenic	
(Korea) 2014	Alejandro Villanueva Valencia	Michoacán	Top 10		
(Indonesia) 2013	Hans Jael Valdez Briseño	Sinaloa	3rd Runner-up		
(Thailand) 2012	Diego Armando García Merino	Jalisco	Withdrew		
(Thailand) 2011	Sérgio Felipe Meléndez Rebollo	Chihuahua	Top 10	Most Popular Man	

=== Mister Global ===
Year	Mister Global Mexico	State	Competition performance		Ref.
Year	Mister Global Mexico	State	Placements	Special award(s)	Ref.
(Thailand) 2026	Alexander Cardona Cardenas	Puebla	Top 10		
(Thailand) 2025	Gabriel Alejandro Silva Saucedo	Colima	2nd Runner-up		
(Thailand) 2024	Bryan Martín Vázquez Holguín	Chihuahua	Top 10		
(Thailand) 2023	José Carlos Novelo Puerto	Yucatán	Top 10		
(Thailand) 2022	José Ángel Mora Garciglia	Baja California Sur	Top 15	Most Inspiring Gentleman	
(Thailand) 2021	Gabriel Alejandro Ortiz Aguayo	Colima	4th Runner-up		
(Thailand) 2019	Manuel Duarte López	Michoacán	Top 16		
(Thailand) 2018	Antonio Merchant Muciño	San Luis Potosí	Unplaced		

=== Manhunt International ===
Year	Manhunt International Mexico	State	Competition performance		Ref.
Year	Manhunt International Mexico	State	Placements	Special award(s)	Ref.
(Vietnam) 2027	Leonardo Ramírez Solórzano	San Luis Potosí			
(Sri Lanka) 2026	Alan Ramón Estrada Jiménez	Michoacán	Unplaced	Best Personality	
(Thailand) 2025	José Carlos Novelo Puerto	Yucatán	5th Runner-up		

=== Mr Universe Model ===
Year	Mr Universe Model Mexico	State	Competition performance		Ref.
Year	Mr Universe Model Mexico	State	Placements	Special award(s)	Ref.
(Dominican Republic) 2019	Carlos Manuel López Macías	Baja California Sur	Top 15		
(Dominican Republic) 2018	Sérgio Quijada Herrera	Sonora	Unplaced		
(Dominican Republic) 2017	Zamir Sierra Pedro	Nuevo León	2nd Runner-up	Mister Congeniality	
(Dominican Republic) 2016	Sergio Montesinos Solis	Nuevo León	Unplaced		
(Dominican Republic) 2015	Christian Ramírez Nieves	Baja California Sur	Top 13		
(Dominican Republic) 2014	Edgar Gabriel Navarro Guillén	Colima	Top 13	Mister Photogenic	
(Dominican Republic) 2013	Rafael Armando Chávez Velasquez	Sinaloa	Mr Universe Model 2013		
(Dominican Republic) 2012	Armando Armenta Villa	Sonora	Unplaced		
(Dominican Republic) 2011	Christian de la Campa Herrera	Jalisco	Top 10		

== See also ==
- Mr World Mexico
- Mister México
- Mexicana Universal
- Miss Mexico Organization
- Miss Earth Mexico
- Miss Grand Mexico
- Señorita México
