= Mr World Mexico =

National male beauty pageant competition in Mexico

- Formation: 1996; 30 years ago
- Type: Male Beauty pageant
- Headquarters: Mexico City
- Location: Mexico
- Members: Mister World
- Official language: Spanish
- President: Hugo Castellanos
- Website: Official website

Mr World Mexico refers to the pageant title given to the Mexican men chosen to represent Mexico at the international male beauty pageant Mister World.

The nation has taken part in every edition of Mister World ever since its establishment in 1996, debut year in which Mexico's Gabriel Soto placed second (first runner-up) — the highest placement achieved by a Mexican contestant in that event to this day.

As of 2016, the Miss Mexico Organization is in charge of making the selection of the country's delegate to Mister World, generally occurring every year the (usually biannual) global competition takes place. Lupita Jones and the Nuestra Belleza México organization previously held the Mister World franchise in Mexico (from 1996 to 2016) and dubbed the national contest as El Modelo México, literally The (male) Model Mexico.

== Editions ==
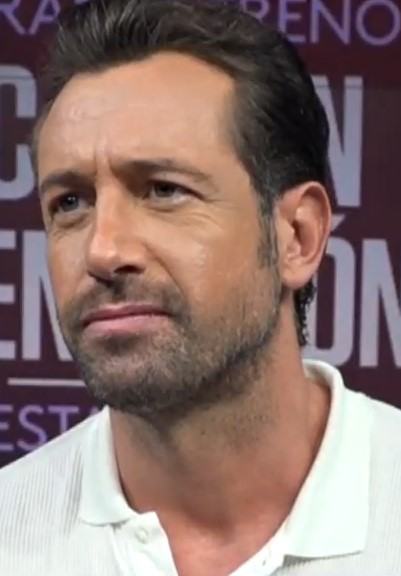
Gabriel Soto, El Modelo México 1996 and 1st Runner-up in Mister World 1996.

Below are the names of the Mr World Mexico titleholders (known as El Modelo Mexico from 1996 to 2014), their state of origin and the venue which played host to their crowning, in ascending order.

Year	Titleholders	State	Venue	Entrants
1996	Gabriel Soto Borja Díaz	Distrito Federal	Appointed	
1997	Eduardo Rodríguez Álvarez	San Luis Potosí	Cineteca Alameda, San Luis Potosí.	10
2000	Guido Verner Quiles Gutiérrez	Distrito Federal.	Televisa San Ángel, Distrito Federal	32
2003	José Luis Reséndez Santos	Nuevo León	Televisa San Ángel, Distrito Federal	32
2006	Jorge Iván Aceves Villalpando	Jalisco	Televisa San Ángel, Distrito Federal	32
2010	Álvaro Álvarez Sepúlveda	Distrito Federal	Casting was held to select the representative for Mister World.	
2012	Enrique Ramírez Mayagoitia	Nuevo León	Casting was held to select the representative for Mister World.	
2014	Alejandro Villanueva Valencia^{[a]} (Resigned)	Michoacán	Casting was held to select the representative for Mister World.	
2014	José Pablo Minor Medrano (Assumed)	Distrito Federal	Casting was held to select the representative for Mister World.	
2016	Aldo Esparza Ramírez	Jalisco	DoubleTree by Hilton, Santa Fe, Mexico City	15
2017	Brian Arturo Faugier González	Nuevo León	Palacio de la Cultura y la Comunicación, Jalisco	32
2024	Alan Salazar Casillas	Ciudad de México	Teatro Francisco Javier Clavijero, Veracruz	32
2026	Sergio Ángel Castro Grijalva	Morelos	Dion live Center, Monterrey, Nuevo León	32

^{a} The original titleholder Alejandro Valencia was replaced due a motorcycle accident from which recovery time interfered with his participation.

== Titleholders ==
=== Mister World ===
Color key

- : Declared as Winner
- : Ended as Runner-up or top 5/6 qualification
- : Ended as one of the Finalist/Semi-finalists

Host/Year	Mister World Mexico	State	Competition performance		Ref.
Host/Year	Mister World Mexico	State	Placements	Title/Award	Ref.
2026	Sergio Ángel Castro Grijalva	Morelos	TBA		
(Vietnam) 2024	Alan Salazar Casillas	Ciudad de México	Top 20	5 Special Awards: Top 12 – Mister Top Model; Top 17 – Mister Multimedia; Top 20 – Best National Costume; Top 30 – Beauty With a Purpose; Top 36 – Talent Round	
(Philippines) 2019	Brian Arturo Faugier González	Nuevo León	2nd Runner-up	5 Special Awards: Winner – Mister World Americas; Winner – Mister Top Model; 2° Place – Mister Multimedia; Top 20 – Talent Round; Top 20 – Extreme Sports	
(England) 2016	Aldo Esparza Ramírez	Jalisco	2nd Runner-up	2 Special Awards: 3° Place – Extreme Sports; Top 10 – Mister Multimedia	
(England) 2014	José Pablo Minor Medrano	Distrito Federal	2nd Runner-up	2 Special Awards: Top 13 – Talent Round; Top 24 – Extreme Sports	
(England) 2014	Alejandro Villanueva Valencia	Michoacán	Did not compete^{[a]}		
(England) 2012	Enrique Ramírez Mayagoitia	Nuevo León	Unplaced	1 Special Awards: Top 12 – Sports Challenge	
(Korea) 2010	Álvaro Álvarez Sepúlveda	Distrito Federal	Top 15	2 Special Awards: Top 8 – Sports Challenge; Top 20 – Mister Top Model	
(China) 2007	Jorge Iván Aceves Villalpando	Jalisco	Unplaced	1 Special Awards: Top 15 – Sports Challenge	
(England) 2003	José Luis Reséndez Santos	Nuevo León	3rd Runner-up		
(Scotland) 2000	Guido Verner Quiles Gutiérrez	Distrito Federal	Top 10		
(Portugal) 1998	Eduardo Rodríguez Álvarez	San Luis Potosí	Unplaced		
(Turkey) 1996	Gabriel Soto Borja Díaz	Distrito Federal	1st Runner-up		

=== Manhunt International ===
Host/Year	Manhunt International Mexico	State	Competition performance		Ref.
Host/Year	Manhunt International Mexico	State	Placements	Title/Award	Ref.
(Singapore) 2000	David Zepeda Quintero	Sonora	1st Runner-up		
(Philippines) 1999	José Daniel Cortés Romo	Distrito Federal	Top 10	2 Special Awards: Winner – Mister Photogenic; 2° Place – Best National Costume	
(Australia) 1998	Jorge Rodríguez	Durango	Top 10		

== See also ==
- Mister México
- Mr Model México
- Miss Mexico Organization
- Mexicana Universal
- Miss Earth Mexico
- Miss Grand Mexico
- Señorita México
