= Luz de mis noches =

- Genre: Telenovela
- Based on: Mariana de la noche by Delia Fiallo
- Written by: Antonio Abascal; Carlos Daniel González; Dante Hernández Miranda; Sol Rubí Santillana
- Starring: Romina Poza; José Pablo Minor
- Country of origin: Mexico
- Original language: Spanish

Production
- Executive producer: Carlos Moreno
- Producer: Hilda Santaella Hernández
- Camera setup: Multi-camera
- Production company: TelevisaUnivision

Original release
- Network: Las Estrellas

Related
- Mariana de la noche (2003)

Luz de mis noches is an upcoming Mexican telenovela produced by Carlos Moreno for TelevisaUnivision. It is based on the 1976 Venezuelan telenovela Mariana de la noche created by Delia Fiallo. The series stars Romina Poza and José Pablo Minor. It is set to premiere on Las Estrellas on 15 February 2027.

== Cast ==
- Romina Poza as Luz Montealbán
- José Pablo Minor as Bernardo Valencia "Lobo"
- Jorge Salinas as Aristeo
- Karla Esquivel as Carmina
- Andrés Palacios as Servando
- Roberto Sosa as Estevez
- Odiseo Bichir as Indalecio
- Vanessa Bauche as Engracia
- Fernanda Borches as Inés
- Alma Delfina as Concha
- Mayra Rojas as Ruperta
- Carlos Speitzer as Veneno
- Pierre Louis as Calavera
- Ramsés Alemán as Gabino
- Moma Moreno as Jade
- Bernardo Flores as Gael
- Damiana Bej as Miguelina

== Production ==
On 14 July 2026, it was announced that Carlos Moreno would be producing a remake of the 1976 Venezuelan telenovela Mariana de la noche, which had previously been adapted in Mexico in 2003 under the same title. On 25 August, Romina Poza and José Pablo Minor were announced in the lead roles. Filming of the telenovela began on 21 September, with a blessing ceremony being held the following week.
