= Mariana de la noche =

Mariana de la noche may refer to:

- "Mariana de la noche" (Venezuelan TV series), 1976
- "Mariana de la noche" (Mexican TV series), 2003
