= Hans Briseño =

Mexican model and pageant titleholder

- Born: Hans Jael Valdez Briseño; January 15, 1995 (age 31); Mazatlán, Sinaloa, Mexico
- Occupation: Model
- Height: 1.82 m (5 ft 11 1/2 in)
- Title: Mister International Mexico 2013

Hans Jael Valdez Briseño is Mexican model and beauty pageant titleholder who was crowned Mister International Mexico. He became Mexico's representative to Mister International 2013 and finished as third runner-up.

== Life and career ==
Briseño was born January 15, 1995 in Mazatlán, Sinaloa. At the age of 17, while studying gastronomy and playing American football, he entered the modeling industry, making his debut in runway shows and photographic sessions. In 2012, he represented Sinaloa at the Mr Model México pageant, where he received the Mr Hearth Young title, earning the opportunity to represent Mexico internationally. The following year, Briseño competed at the Mister International pageant, held on November 21, 2013 in Skenoo Exhibition Hall, Jakarta, Indonesia, where he finished as third runner-up, making her the first Mexican to reach the highest placement for the first time at this pageant.

Awards and achievements
| Preceded by (Brazil) Ricardo Magrino | Mister International 3rd Runner-up; 2013 | Succeeded by (Poland) Rafał Maślak |
| Preceded by Felipe Meléndez | Mister International Mexico; 2013 | Succeeded by Alejandro Valencia |
