= Mister Philippines 2009 =

Mister Philippines 2009 is a male pageant in the Philippines. The winner of Mister Philippines 2009, Michael Manansala of Pampanga, Philippines, represented the Philippines in the fourth Mister International male pageant, that was held in Plaza International Hotel, Taichung, Taiwan on December 19, 2009. A total of 29 contestants competed for the title and for the first time the Philippines did not place since they sent a representative.

== See also ==
- Manhunt International
- Mister World
