= Gabriel Ortiz =

Gabriel Ortiz may refer to:

- Gabriel Ortiz de Orbé (1600–1661), Spanish prelate of the Roman Catholic Church
- Gabriel Ortiz (model) (born 1995), Mexican male model
- Gabriel Ortiz (racewalking) (born 1981), Mexican race walker

== See also ==
- Gabriela Ortiz, Mexican music educator and composer
