= Mr Model México 2026 =

14th edition of Mr Model México

- Date: May 6, 2026
- Presenters: Gustavo Manuel
- Venue: La Maraka, Benito Juárez, Mexico City
- Broadcaster: YouTube
- Entrants: 25
- Placements: 6
- Winner: Andrés Briseño; Sinaloa
- Congeniality: Alessandro Dagnio; Estado de México
- Photogenic: Gamaliel Arias; Michoacán

Mr Model México 2026 is the 14th edition of the Mr Model México pageant, held on May 6, 2026 in La Maraka, Benito Juárez, Mexico City. The Mr Model México 2025 winners subsequently passed on their titles to their respective successors at the end of the event.

The competition is slated to select Mexico's representatives to various international male pageants, including Mister International, Mister Global, Manhunt International, and Caballero Universal.

== Results ==
=== Placements ===
Color keys

- Declared as winner
- Ended as runner-up or top 5/6 qualification
- Ended as one of the finalists or semifinalists
- Ended did not place

=== Mr Model México 2026 ===
Placement	Delegate	International Placement
Mister International Mexico 2026	Sinaloa – Andrés Briseño	Winner – Mister International 2026
Mister Global Mexico 2026	Puebla – Alexander Cardona	Top 10 – Mister Global 2026
Manhunt International Mexico 2027	San Luis Potosí – Leonardo Ramírez	TBD – Manhunt International 2027
Caballero Universal Mexico 2026	Veracruz – Cristian Mandujano	1st Prince – Caballero Universal 2026
Top 6	Ciudad de México – Octavio Vernet; Michoacán – Gamaliel Arias	

== Official Delegates ==
25 delegates competed for the title:

State	Delegate	Age	Height
Aguascalientes	Diego Hermosillo Pizaña	24	1.80 m (5 ft 11 in)
Baja California	Carlomagno Ceceñas Fernández	23	1.81 m (5 ft 11 1/2 in)
Campeche	Daniel Humberto Hernández Pool	28	1.80 m (5 ft 11 in)
Chihuahua	Sebastian Cedeño Manrique	34	1.88 m (6 ft 2 in)
Ciudad de México	Octavio Isaí Vernet Pérez	21	1.83 m (6 ft 0 in)
Coahuila	José Perez Saíz	33	1.91 m (6 ft 3 in)
Colima	Felipe Alejandro Cruz Martínez	23	1.84 m (6 ft 1/2 in)
Durango	José Miguel Rodríguez Díaz	29	1.84 m (6 ft 1/2 in)
Estado de México	Alessandro Dagnio Peña	22	1.80 m (5 ft 11 in)
Guerrero	Daniel Arzate Martínez	25	1.80 m (5 ft 11 in)
Hidalgo	Jesús Herbey Hernández Rayas	30	1.89 m (6 ft 2 1/2 in)
Jalisco	Fernando José Loera Martínez	26	1.89 m (6 ft 2 1/2 in)
Michoacán	Francisco Gamaliel Arias Romo	24	1.86 m (6 ft 1 in)
Morelos	Francisco Santos Aguilera	26	1.83 m (6 ft 0 in)
Nayarit	Roberto Arturo Fonseca Veliz	30	1.83 m (6 ft 0 in)
Nuevo León	Heriberto Cavazos Garza	27	1.85 m (6 ft 1 in)
Puebla	Edgar Alexander Cardona Cardenas	28	1.82 m (5 ft 11 1/2 in)
Querétaro	Martín Vega Rodríguez	27	1.81 m (5 ft 11 1/2 in)
San Luis Potosí	Leonardo Ramírez Solórzano	19	1.95 m (6 ft 5 in)
Sinaloa	Andrés Briseño Briseño	21	1.85 m (6 ft 1 in)
Tabasco	Victor José Jiménez Suárez	32	1.80 m (5 ft 11 in)
Tamaulipas	Alexis Cuin Palacios	26	1.87 m (6 ft 1 1/2 in)
Tlaxcala	Alexis Hinojosa Cruz	30	1.83 m (6 ft 0 in)
Veracruz	Cristian Enrique Moreno Mandujano	25	1.87 m (6 ft 1 1/2 in)
Yucatán	Felix Saúl López Caro	29	1.78 m (5 ft 10 in)
