= Princess in the Palace =

Philippine television drama series

- Title card
- Genre: Comedy drama
- Developed by: Jose Mari Abacan; Lia Domingo; Cyril Ramos; Jerome Zamora
- Written by: Robert Raz; Charlotte Dianco; Ma. Acy Ramos; Michelle Ngu
- Directed by: Mike Tuviera
- Creative director: Jenny Ferre
- Starring: Ryzza Mae Dizon
- Country of origin: Philippines
- Original language: Tagalog
- No. of episodes: 187

Production
- Executive producer: Adrian Raphael V. Santos
- Producers: Antonio P. Tuviera; Jacqui L. Cara; Michael Tuviera; Jojo C. Oconer; Ramel L. David; Camille G. Montaño
- Production locations: Manila, Philippines
- Editors: Bong Guillermo; Tara Illenberger
- Camera setup: Multiple-camera setup
- Running time: 30 minutes
- Production company: TAPE Inc.

Original release
- Network: GMA Network
- Release: September 21, 2015 – June 10, 2016

Princess in the Palace is a Philippine television drama comedy series broadcast by GMA Network. Directed by Mike Tuviera, it stars Ryzza Mae Dizon in the title role. It premiered on September 21, 2015 on the network's morning line up. The series concluded on June 10, 2016, with a total of 187 episodes.

== Premise ==
Princess Cruz, is found following an accident and adopted by Leonora Clarissa Jacinto, the President of the Philippines.

== Cast and characters ==
Cast

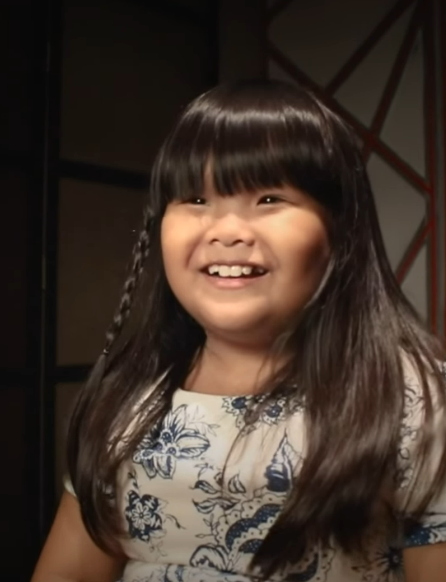
Ryzza Mae Dizon

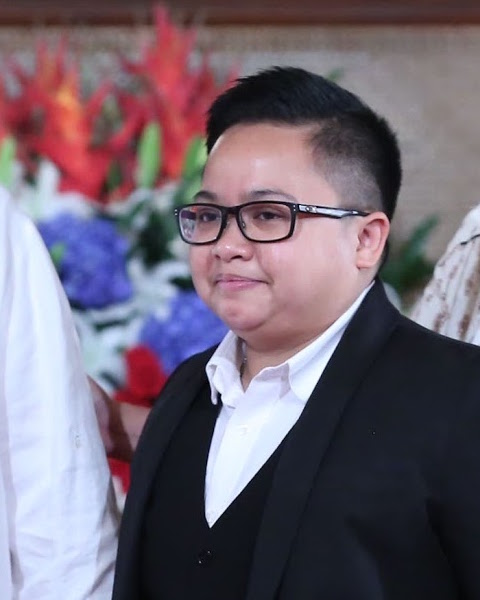
Aiza Seguerra

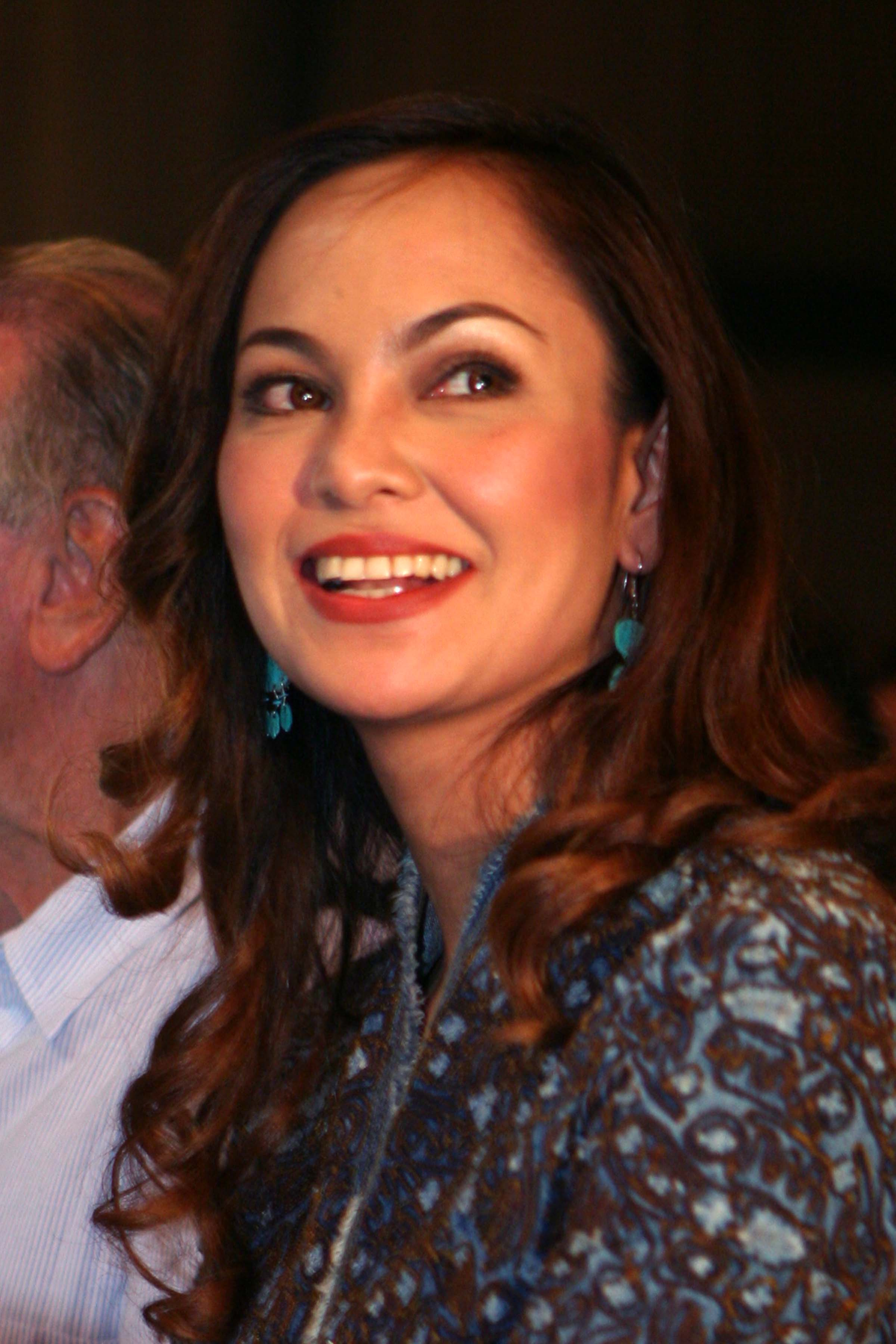
Eula Valdez

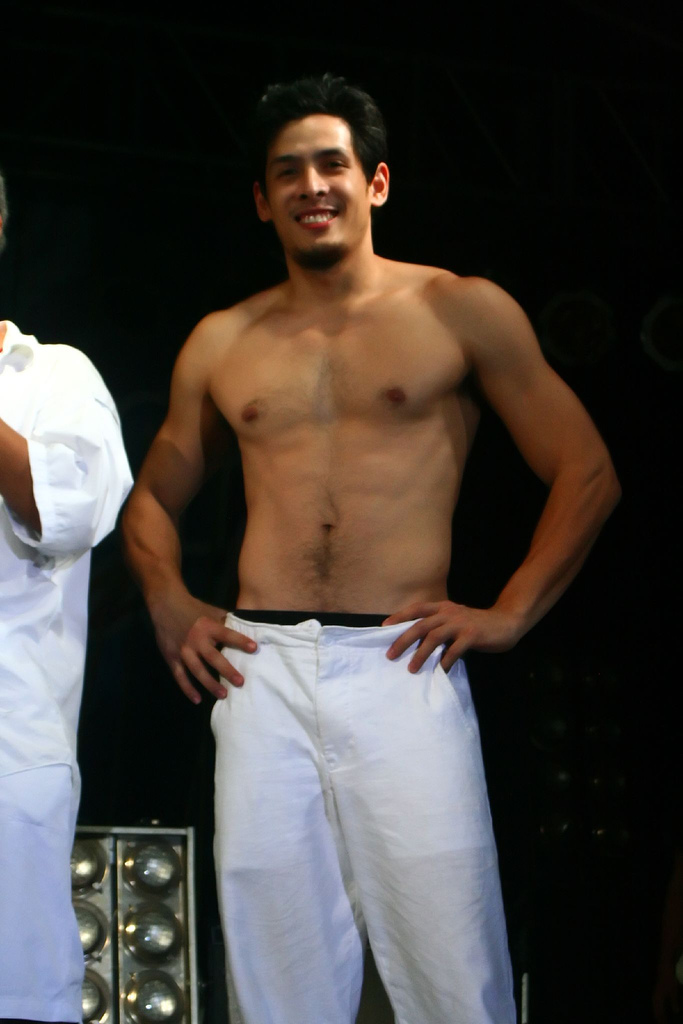
Christian Vasquez

Lead cast

- Ryzza Mae Dizon as Princess Cruz / Princess Jacinto

Supporting cast

- Aiza Seguerra as Josephine "Joey" David
- Eula Valdez as Leonora Clarissa "Leona" Jacinto-Gonzaga
- Christian Vasquez as Oliver Gonzaga
- Allen Dizon as Alejandro "Lejan" Dominguez
- Marc Abaya as Rafael Jacinto
- Ciara Sotto as Daphne Jacinto
- Ces Quesada as Luz
- Boots Anson-Roa as Victorina Jacinto
- Kitkat as Portia
- Rocky Salumbides as Samuel
- Miggy Jimenez as Joaquin Jacinto
- Lianne Valentin as Karen
- Hailey Lim as Tara
- Joey Paras as Georgina Veloso
- Vincent de Jesus as Kwini
- Dante Rivero as Thomas "Tomas" Cruz
- Lito Legaspi as Manuel Gonzaga

Recurring cast

- Neil Perez as Timoteo delos Santos
- Kiko Estrada as Ikot Castro
- Andrea del Rosario as Diana Marquez
- Gabby Eigenmann as Renato
- Lui Manansala as Senen
- Patani Daño as Lily
- Rodjun Cruz as Kenneth
- Valeen Montenegro as Gwen Dizon
- Nadine Samonte as Judy Cruz
- Maine Mendoza as Elizabeth "Elize" Ricardo
- Chanda Romero as Pilar Buenaventura
- Afi Africa as Tweety

Guest cast

- Mona Louise Rey as Clara
- Yassi Pressman as Perla
- Rhen Escaño as younger Leonora
- Mosang as Jacqueline Flores Katigbak-Vanderbilt
- Luigi Fernando as Ramos
- Andrea Sigrid as Karen's teacher
- Chinggoy Alonzo as Carlos Jacinto
- Jenny Miller as Cordova
- Kate Lapuz as Valerie Tengco
- Gilleth Sandico as Elsie
- Toby Alejar as Miguel
- Kiel Rodriguez as Francis Bandilla
- Janvier Daily as Ato

== Ratings ==
According to AGB Nielsen Philippines' Mega Manila household television ratings, the pilot episode of Princess in the Palace earned an 18.9% rating. The final episode scored a 12.4% rating.

== Accolades ==
Accolades received by Princess in the Palace
Year	Award	Category	Recipient	Result	Ref.
2016	30th PMPC Star Awards for Television	Best Child Performer	Ryzza Mae Dizon	Nominated	
