= Aung Chan Mya =

Burmese model and male pageant winner

- Born: Aung Chan Mya; 1994; Yangon, Myanmar
- Occupation: model
- Height: 1.82 m (5 ft 11 1/2 in)
- Beauty pageant titleholder
- Title: Mister International Myanmar 2014
- Hair color: Black
- Eye color: Brown
- Major competitions: Mister International Myanmar 2014 (Winner); Mister International 2014 (top 15)

Aung Chan Mya (Burmese: အောင်ချမ်းမြ; born 1994) is a Burmese model and male pageant winner who won the Mister International Myanmar 2014 and represented Myanmar at the Mister International 2014 in Seoul on 14 February 2015.

== Pageantry ==
=== Mister International Myanmar 2014 ===
He competed in the Mister Myanmar 2014 which was held on 8 November 2014 in Taw Win Garden Hotel, Yangon Myanmar. He became the winner of the Mister International Myanmar 2014 after the competition. Additionally, he was awarded as Myanmar's Choice awards.

=== Mister International 2014 ===
He represented Myanmar at the Mister International 2014 pageant which took place in Seoul, Korea on February 14, 2015, where he competed against 50 pageant hopefuls from around the world. After the competition, he placed in the top 15.
