= Mi marido tiene familia =

Mexican telenovela

- Genre: Telenovela
- Created by: Héctor Forero López; Pablo Ferrer García-Travesí
- Based on: My Husband Got a Family by Park Ji-eun
- Screenplay by: Santiago Pineda; Mariana Mijares; Lenny Ferro; Gabriela Ruffo
- Directed by: Aurelio Ávila; Héctor Bonilla; Francisco Franco
- Starring: Zuria Vega; Daniel Arenas; Diana Bracho; Silvia Pinal; Arath de la Torre; Susana González; Carmen Salinas; Gabriel Soto
- Opening theme: "Tú eres la razón" (Note: Performed by Angelina & Los Fontana in the first season, and Los Fontana and Margarita "La Diosa de la Cumbia" in the second season.)
- Ending theme: "Llegaste a mí vida" by Yahir
- Country of origin: Mexico
- Original language: Spanish
- No. of seasons: 2
- No. of episodes: 269 (list of episodes)

Production
- Executive producer: Juan Osorio
- Producers: Roy Nelson Rojas; Ignacio Ortiz Castillo
- Production locations: Oaxaca de Juárez; Santa María del Tule; Hierve el Agua; Puerto Escondido, Oaxaca; Mexico City; Barcelona, Spain
- Cinematography: Mauricio Manzano; Gilberto Macín Arenas; Martha Montúfar
- Editors: Norma Ramírez; Alejandro Iglesias; Mauricio Coronel; Daniel Rentería
- Camera setup: Multi-camera
- Production company: Televisa

Original release
- Network: Las Estrellas
- Release: June 5, 2017 – February 24, 2019

Related
- Una familia con suerte; El corazón nunca se equivoca

Mi marido tiene familia, also known as Mi marido tiene más familia for the second season and stylized onscreen as Mi marido tiene + familia, is a Mexican comedy telenovela that premiered on Las Estrellas on June 5, 2017 and ended on February 24, 2019. Produced for Televisa by Juan Osorio and Roy Rojas and created by Héctor Forero López and Pablo Ferrer García-Travesí, based on the South Korean series My Husband Got a Family written by Park Ji-eun and produced by KBS. It stars Zuria Vega, Daniel Arenas, Diana Bracho and Silvia Pinal.

The series revolves around Robert Cooper, a doctor who was adopted by a Colombian American family, but wants to know who his biological parents are. His wife, Julieta Aguilar is in charge of helping him find his family, but she fears that they won't accept her.

On October 18, 2017, Juan Osorio confirmed that the show has been renewed for a second season. The second season premiered on July 9, 2018.

== Episodes ==
Season	Title	Episodes	Originally released	
Season	Title	Episodes	First released	Last released
1	Mi marido tiene familia	102	5 June 2017	22 October 2017
2	Mi marido tiene más familia	167	9 July 2018	24 February 2019

=== Mi marido tiene familia (2017) ===
Julieta (Zuria Vega) and Robert (Daniel Arenas) have the perfect relationship: they both have jobs, they share their dreams and have agreed to not get married. For them, the secret lies in two points: communication and the fact that the adoptive family of Robert lives in another country, saving them the problems of dealing with the in-laws. However, fate has prepared a surprise when they must move to an apartment in a modest area of Oaxaca. There they meet the owners of the building, the Córcega family, not knowing that they are the true family of Robert and that his real name is Juan Pablo. From there, Robert / Juan Pablo and Julieta will have to learn to live with their in-laws, Blanca (Diana Bracho) and Eugenio (Rafael Inclán), and the sisters-in-law, with all the demands that this entails: a battle between tradition and modernity (including to have the couple get married), a whirlwind of emotions and adventures. If they want to achieve the happiness they are looking for, Julieta and Juan Pablo must learn to live with their new family, even if this is more complicated than they thought.

=== Mi marido tiene más familia (2018–19) ===
Finally, Julieta has managed to maintain a personal and professional life with balance, next to Robert and their children: the adopted 4-year-old David, and biological daughter Blanquita who is just months old. Again, the Córcega family will face a series of problems, unleashed when Robert finds his grandfather, Canuto "Tito" Córcega (Carlos Bracho), the "deceased" father of Eugenio, Tulio and Audifaz, something Doña Imelda made them believe when he unexpectedly left due to being unfaithful with Crisanta decades ago. On the other hand, Julieta goes through hot flashes with the arrival of Susana Córcega (Susana González), as her new boss, but Susana is nothing more and nothing less than the daughter that Canuto and Crisanta procreated in Baja California, and together they get to know the rest of the Córcegas in Oaxaca. Susana will test Julieta's ability to excel; she can not believe that her new boss is Robert's blood-related aunt and, therefore, her political aunt. Believing that fate is determined to put more obstacles than she has already had to cross, definitely so it is, because now Julieta has more political family, something that she always wanted to flee. Daniela and Gabriel, have built a stable marriage before the conflicts of their families: the Córcega and the Musi. Daniela will take on a greater challenge when Gabriel asks her to have a child. This will trigger even more problems between families.

For Robert, it is a real miracle to have found all of the Córcegas, who also include Susana, half-sister of Eugenio, Tulio and Audifaz, and Sebastián and Axel, sons of Susana and cousins of Robert. Susana also happens to be the new head director of Klass, the company Julieta works at and temporarily led, pushing her to "second-in-command". New tenants, Francisco "Pancho" López and his children, move into the building as a way of escaping from their hurtful past in Mexico City. The remaining members of the Córcega family will detonate a new thread: the fights. This implies new challenges in the lives of Julieta and Robert, including uniting the entire Córcega clan and standing up for yourself at work, and together they will demonstrate that, in spite of the problems of the families they will be able to follow ahead, seeing by their well-being.

== Cast ==
=== Main ===
- Zuria Vega as Julieta Aguilar Rivera
- Daniel Arenas as Robert Cooper / Juan Pablo Córcega
- Diana Bracho as Blanca Gómez de Córcega
- Silvia Pinal as Imelda Sierra de Córcega
- Arath de la Torre as Francisco "Pancho" López (season 2)
- Susana González as Susana Córcega (season 2)
- Carmen Salinas as Crisanta Díaz de Córcega (season 2)
- Gabriel Soto as Ernesto "Neto" Rey (season 2)

=== Recurring and guest ===
- Rafael Inclán as Eugenio Córcega
- Luz María Jerez as Belén Gómez (season 1)
- René Casados as Audifaz Córcega
- Olivia Bucio as Catalina Rivera
- Lola Merino as Ana Romano (season 1)
- Regina Orozco as Amalia Gómez
- Gaby Platas as Amapola "Polita" Castañeda
- Laura Vignati as Daniela Córcega
- Jessica Coch as Marisol Córcega (season 1)
- Ignacio Casano as Hugo Aguilar
- José Pablo Minor as Gabriel Musi
- Federico Ayos as Bruno Aguilar (season 1)
- Jade Fraser as Linda Córcega
- Emilio Osorio as Aristóteles Córcega
- Marco Muñoz as Tulio Córcega
- Juan Vidal as Julián Guerra (season 1)
- Isabella Tena as Frida Meneses
- Paola Toyos as Begoña Bustamante (season 1)
- Marcos Montero as Ignacio Meneses
- Bárbara Islas as Diana Mejía
- Luis Gerardo Cuburu as Octavio
- Latin Lover as Enzo
- Yahir as Xavi Galán (season 1)
- Eric Del Castillo as Hugo Aguilar (season 1)
- Mauricio Abularach as Benjamín (season 1)
- Violeta Isfel as Clarissa Musi
- Manuel Landeta as Augusto Musi (season 1)
- María Nela Sinisterra as Luz (season 1)
- Ligia Uriarte as Daphne (season 1)
- Carlos Bracho as Canuto "Tito" Córcega (season 2)
- Ana Jimena Villanueva as Cassandra Musi
- Gonzalo Vega Sisto como Axel Legorreta Córcega (season 2)
- Carlos Madrigal as Vicente Legorreta (season 2)
- Paola Acher as Eréndira
- Rodrigo Pérez "El Canelito" as Sebastián Legorreta Córcega (season 2)
- Ruy Rodrigo as David Cooper Aguilar
- Márama as themselves (guest; season 1)
- Pau y Davo as themselves (guest; season 1)
- Flor Rubio as Herself (guest; season 1)
- Marjorie de Sousa as Herself (guest; season 1)
- Patricio Castillo as Massimo Musi (season 2)
- Joaquín Bondoni as Cuauhtémoc "Temo" López (season 2)
- Mayrín Villanueva as Rebeca Treviño Garza (guest; season 2)

== Production ==
Filming for the telenovela began on April 11, 2017 in Oaxaca. Locations in Mexico included Oaxaca and Televisa San Ángel. The trailer for the telenovela was unveiled on the upfront of Univision for the 2017-2018 television season. The telenovela was renewed for a second season on 18 October 2017, days before the end of the first season. The season started filming on 9 May 2018 and ended in February 2019. On 28 May 2018, People en Español confirmed that the telenovela would change its title to Mi marido tiene más familia. According to Juan Osorio, the title's change happened to give keep up with the show's new story.

=== Casting ===
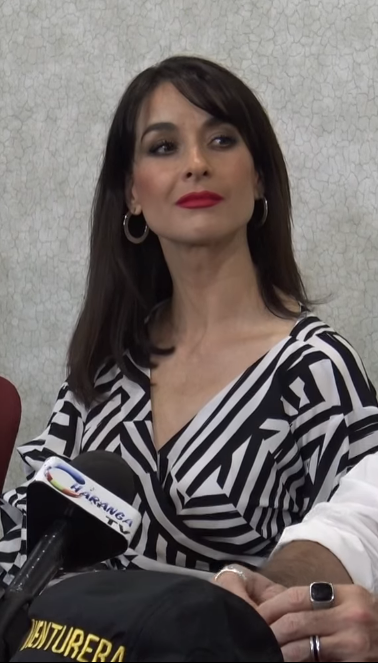
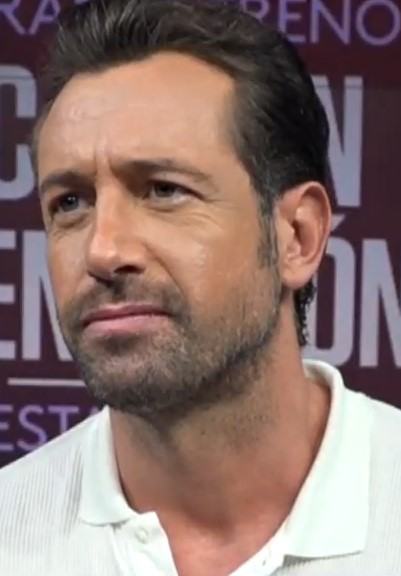
Susana González and Gabriel Soto

Like the previous season, several actors resumed their characters such as Zuria Vega, Daniel Arenas, Laura Vignatti, José Pablo Minor, Diana Bracho, Rafael Inclán, and Silvia Pinal. On December 22, 2017, it was confirmed that Arath de la Torre would play Pancho López, a character that he played in 2011 in the telenovela Una familia con suerte. On 1 May 2018 it was confirmed that Vega's brother, Gonzalo Vega would be in the second season, as well as Susana González, Carlos Bracho and the return to television of Carmen Salinas.

On August 31, 2018, it was confirmed that the actress Zuria Vega would leave the production. On September 12, 2018, it was confirmed that the second season would lengthen to more chapters due to the audience obtained throughout 2018. After the extension of the production and the exit of Vega, it was confirmed on September 28, 2018, that the actor Daniel Arenas would leave the telenovela due to family commitments. Due to the lengthening of the second season and the departure of the protagonists, on October 26, 2018 People en Español magazine confirmed that Gabriel Soto would enter the production as protagonist with Susana González, and Arath de la Torre. It also confirmed the inclusion of new actors such as the twins José Manuel and José Pablo, and Azul Guaita. Also due to the show being lengthened, Pablo Minor's character was written off due to the actor having signed to another show prior to the second season.

=== Music ===
The main theme of the telenovela "Tú eres la razón" was composed by Eduardo Murguía and Mauricio Arriaga and performed by Angelina & Los Fontana. The second song titled "Llegaste a mi vida" was composed by José Luis Roma and performed by Yahir.

== Spin-off ==
Juan Osorio confirmed in February 2019 that the series would have a spin-off based upon "Aristemo", the gay couple formed by the characters Aristóteles Córcega and Temo López, portrayed by Emilio Osorio and Joaquín Bondoni, respectively. Filming of the spin-off began in April 2019. El corazón nunca se equivoca premiered on June 24, 2019.

== Rating ==
=== Mexico rating ===
Season	Timeslot (CT)	Episodes	First aired		Last aired	
Season	Timeslot (CT)	Episodes	Date	Viewers (millions)	Date	Viewers (millions)
1	Mon–Fri 8:30pm	102	June 5, 2017	3.9	October 22, 2017	3.9
2	Mon–Fri 8:30pm	167	July 9, 2018	3.3	February 24, 2019	3.9

=== U.S. rating ===
Season	Timeslot (ET)	Episodes	First aired		Last aired	
Season	Timeslot (ET)	Episodes	Date	Viewers (millions)	Date	Viewers (millions)
1	Mon–Fri 9pm/8c	100	August 21, 2017	1.67	January 12, 2018	2.00
2	Mon–Fri 9pm/8c	147	September 11, 2018	1.87	April 15, 2019	1.49

== Awards and nominations ==
Year	Award	Category	Nominated	Result
2018	TVyNovelas Awards	Best Telenovela of the Year	Juan Osorio	Nominated
2018	TVyNovelas Awards	Best Actress	Zuria Vega	Nominated
2018	TVyNovelas Awards	Best Actor	Daniel Arenas	Nominated
2018	TVyNovelas Awards	Best Antagonist Actress	Lola Merino	Nominated
2018	TVyNovelas Awards	Best Leading Actress	Silvia Pinal	Won
2018	TVyNovelas Awards	Best Co-lead Actress	Diana Bracho	Won
2018	TVyNovelas Awards	Best Co-lead Actor	Rafael Inclán	Nominated
2018	TVyNovelas Awards	Best Supporting Actress	Olivia Bucio	Nominated
2018	TVyNovelas Awards	Best Original Story or Adaptation	Héctor Forero, Pablo Ferrer, and Martha Jurado	Nominated
2018	TVyNovelas Awards	Best Direction	Héctor Bonilla and Aurelio Ávila	Nominated
2018	TVyNovelas Awards	Best Direction of the Camaras	Mauricio Manzano and Gilberto Macín	Nominated
2018	TVyNovelas Awards	Best Musical Theme	"Tú eres la razón" (Los Fontana and Angelina)	Nominated
2018	TVyNovelas Awards	Best Cast	Mi marido tiene familia	Nominated
2019	TVyNovelas Awards	Best Telenovela of the Year	Juan Osorio	Nominated
2019	TVyNovelas Awards	Best Actress	Susana González	Nominated
2019	TVyNovelas Awards	Best Actress	Zuria Vega	Nominated
2019	TVyNovelas Awards	Best Actor	Arath de la Torre	Nominated
2019	TVyNovelas Awards	Best Actor	Daniel Arenas	Nominated
2019	TVyNovelas Awards	Best Antagonist Actress	Bárbara Islas	Nominated
2019	TVyNovelas Awards	Best Antagonist Actor	Germán Bracco	Nominated
2019	TVyNovelas Awards	Best Leading Actress	Carmen Salinas	Nominated
2019	TVyNovelas Awards	Best Leading Actress	Diana Bracho	Nominated
2019	TVyNovelas Awards	Best Leading Actor	Patricio Castillo	Nominated
2019	TVyNovelas Awards	Best Leading Actor	Rafael Inclán	Nominated
2019	TVyNovelas Awards	Best Co-lead Actress	Gaby Platas	Nominated
2019	TVyNovelas Awards	Best Co-lead Actress	Laura Vignatti	Nominated
2019	TVyNovelas Awards	Best Co-lead Actor	José Pablo Minor	Nominated
2019	TVyNovelas Awards	Best Young Lead Actress	Jade Fraser	Nominated
2019	TVyNovelas Awards	Best Young Lead Actor	Emilio Osorio	Nominated
2019	TVyNovelas Awards	Best Original Story or Adaptation	Pablo Ferrer, Santiago Pineda, and Martha Jurado	Nominated
2019	TVyNovelas Awards	Best Direction	Aurelio Ávila, Francisco Franco, and Juan Pablo Blanco	Nominated
2019	TVyNovelas Awards	Best Direction of the Cameras	Mauricio Manzano and Martha Montufar	Won
2019	TVyNovelas Awards	Best Musical Theme	"Tú eres la razón" (Margarita La Diosa de la Cumbia and Los Fontana)	Nominated
2019	TVyNovelas Awards	Best Cast	Mi marido tiene más familia	Nominated
2019	Eres Awards	Best Actor	Emilio Osorio	Won
2019	Eres Awards	Best Actor	Joaquín Bondoni	Nominated
2019	Eres Awards	Best Actor	José Pablo Minor	Nominated
2019	Eres Awards	Best Kiss	Emilio Osorio and Joaquín Bondoni	Won
2019	GLAAD Media Award	Outstanding Scripted Television Series (Spanish-Language)	Mi marido tiene más familia	Won
