= Pedro Mendes (model) =

Swiss model, Mister International 2015, international male pageant winner

- Born: Pedro Mendes; 1 November 1987 (age 38); Geneva, Switzerland
- Height: 1.88 m (6 ft 2 in)
- Beauty pageant titleholder
- Title: Mister Suisse Francophone 2015; Mister International 2015
- Hair color: Dark Brown
- Eye color: Brown
- Major competitions: Mister Suisse Francophone 2015 (Winner); Mister International 2015 (Winner)
- Website: http://misssuissefrancophone.ch

Pedro Mendes (born 1 November 1987) is a Swiss model and male beauty pageant titleholder who won Mister International 2015 at the finals held at the Newport Performing Arts Theater at Resorts World Manila in Pasay, Metro Manila, Philippines. He is the first Swiss to win the title of Mister International in the history of the pageant, and the second European man who won the title after Ryan Terry, Mister Great Britain 2010.

== Personal life ==
Pedro lives in Geneva, Switzerland and works as a model. He is known as Mister Switzerland 2015 or (in French) Mister Suisse Francophone 2015. He became a brand ambassador of his country with Catarina Lopes, a former Miss Suisse Francophone, who also competed at the Miss Supranational 2015 in Poland and is his girlfriend.

=== Mister International 2015 ===
On 30 November 2015 Pedro was named Mister International 2015, representing Switzerland. He was crowned by Mister International 2014 Neil Perez of the Philippines at the Newport Performing Art Theater Resorts World Manila. He competed with thirty-six other delegates from across the world, to be the next Mister International.

=== Reign as Mister International 2015 ===
After his crowning, during December 2015 Pedro was interviewed by Mornings @ ANC, CNN Philippines, ABS-CBN's "Sports Unlimited", and GMA News TV.

On 13 December 2015 Pedro returned to Switzerland to celebrate his victory and join Conférence Mister Switzerland 2016 at Casino Barrière Montreux.

April 15, 2016 Pedro traveled the Cairo, Egypt to be part of the judge in the final Miss Eco Universe 2016.

During his reign, Pedro have traveled around the globe. Some of the places are Singapore, Philippines, Egypt, United Kingdom, Italy, Canada, Portugal, Malta.

Awards and achievements
Preceded by (Philippines) Neil Perez	Mister International; 2015	Succeeded by (Lebanon) Paul Iskandar
Preceded by Frédéric Marini	Mister Suisse Francophone; 2015	Succeeded by Alessio Costantini
