= El Modelo México 1997 =

Beauty pageant

- Date: April 9, 1997
- Presenters: Marco Antonio Regil; Martha Aguayo
- Entertainment: Patricia Manterola
- Venue: Cineteca Alameda, San Luis Potosí, Mexico
- Broadcaster: Grupo Televisa, S.A.B
- Entrants: 10
- Placements: 5
- Winner: Eduardo Rodríguez; San Luis Potosí

El Modelo México 1997, the first national male pageant created by Lupita Jones, was held at the Cineteca Alameda, San Luis Potosí on April 9, 1997. Ten contestants competed for the national title, which was won by Eduardo Rodríguez from San Luis Potosí, who later competed at Mister World 1998 in Portugal.

Eduardo Rodríguez received the title by Gabriel Soto first finalist in Mister World 1996 and Lupita Jones, first Mexican Miss Universe and national director of Nuestra Belleza México.

== Results ==
=== Placements ===
Color keys

- Declared as winner
- Ended as runner-up or top 5/6 qualification
- Ended as one of the finalists or semifinalists
- Ended did not place

Final results	Candidates	International Placement
El Modelo México 1997	San Luis Potosí – Eduardo Rodríguez	Unplaced – Mister World 1998
1st Runner-up	Sonora – David Zepeda Quintero	Winner – International Male 1998
1st Runner-up	Sonora – David Zepeda Quintero	1st Runner-up – Manhunt International 2000
2nd Runner-up	Coahuila – Jorge Luis Pascual	1st Runner-up – Mr International 2000
3rd Runner-up	Nuevo León – Jesús Solórzano	
4th Runner-up	Baja California – Miguel Angel Cortés	

== Delegates ==
10 candidates ran to win the title.

State	Candidate	Age	Height
Baja California	Miguel Ángel Cortés Villapadua	19	1.92 m (6 ft 3 1/2 in)
Chihuahua	Mauricio Alejandro Fernández Leal	23	1.83 m (6 ft 0 in)
Coahuila	Jorge Luis Pascual	20	1.80 m (5 ft 11 in)
Distrito Federal	Luis Alberto López Ayala	21	1.81 m (5 ft 11 1/2 in)
Distrito Federal	Juan Silveti Mañon	18	1.80 m (5 ft 11 in)
Distrito Federal	Mark Tacher Feingold	19	1.80 m (5 ft 11 in)
Nuevo León	Jesús Solórzano Palomares	20	1.87 m (6 ft 1 1/2 in)
San Luis Potosí	Eduardo Rodríguez Álvarez	23	1.84 m (6 ft 1/2 in)
Sonora	David Anastasio Zepeda Quintero	23	1.85 m (6 ft 1 in)
Tamaulipas	José Eduardo Verástegui Córdoba	22	1.84 m (6 ft 1/2 in)
