= List of Mi marido tiene familia episodes =

Mi marido tiene familia is a Mexican comedy telenovela that premiered on Las Estrellas on June 5, 2017. Produced for Televisa by Juan Osorio and Roy Rojas and created by Héctor Forero López and Pablo Ferrer García-Travesí, based on the South Korean series My Husband Got a Family written by Park Ji-eun and produced by KBS.

On October 18, 2017, Juan Osorio confirmed that the show had been renewed for a second season.

== Series overview ==
Season	Title	Episodes	Originally released	
Season	Title	Episodes	First released	Last released
1	Mi marido tiene familia	102	5 June 2017	22 October 2017
2	Mi marido tiene más familia	167	9 July 2018	24 February 2019

== Episodes ==
=== Season 1 (2017) ===
No. overall	No. in season	Title	Original release date
1	1	"Doña Imelda arruina el cumpleaños de Daniela"	June 5, 2017
2	2	"Julieta y Robert tienen nuevo departameto"	June 6, 2017
3	3	"Robert busca a su familia"	June 7, 2017
4	4	"Ana descubre quién es Robert Cooper"	June 8, 2017
5	5	"Imelda y Blanca creen que Juan Pablo apareció"	June 9, 2017
6	6	"Julián es un impostor"	June 12, 2017
7	7	"Blanca recibe una mala noticia"	June 13, 2017
8	8	"Blanca se da por vencida"	June 14, 2017
9	9	"Los recuerdos de Robert regresan"	June 15, 2017
10	10	"Eugenio ve los recuerdos de Robert"	June 16, 2017
11	11	"Robert está confundido"	June 19, 2017
12	12	"Eugenio encontró a Juan Pablo"	June 20, 2017
13	13	"Padre e hijo se reencuentran"	June 21, 2017
14	14	"Julieta no soporta a la familia Córcega"	June 22, 2017
15	15	"Blanca se entera que Juan Pablo apareció"	June 23, 2017
16	16	"La familia Córcega recibe a Juan Pablo"	June 26, 2017
17	17	"Julieta acepta la familia de Juan Pablo"	June 27, 2017
18	18	"La guerra está declarada"	June 28, 2017
19	19	"Blanca tendrá que alejarse de su hijo"	June 29, 2017
20	20	"Blanca sigue la estrategia de Audifaz"	June 30, 2017
21	21	"Julieta cancela el viaje"	July 3, 2017
22	22	"Juan Pablo le propone matrimonio a Julieta"	July 4, 2017
23	23	"Aristóteles se va de la casa"	July 5, 2017
24	24	"Julieta y Juan Pablo planean su boda"	July 6, 2017
25	25	"Marisol firma el divorcio"	July 7, 2017
26	26	"Imelda y Blanca hacen un sacrificio"	July 10, 2017
27	27	"Daniela cambia de look"	July 11, 2017
28	28	"Julieta y Juan Pablo serán papás"	July 12, 2017
29	29	"Blanca y Catalina se pelean"	July 13, 2017
30	30	"Catalina vivirá con Julieta"	July 14, 2017
31	31	"Catalina chantajea a Julieta"	July 17, 2017
32	32	"Juan Pablo se entera que será papá"	July 18, 2017
33	33	"Juan Pablo corre a Catalina"	July 19, 2017
34	34	"Blanca regaña a Julieta"	July 20, 2017
35	35	"Blanca será abuela"	July 21, 2017
36	36	"Juan Pablo investiga a Julián"	July 24, 2017
37	37	"El embarazo de Julieta ya no es un secreto"	July 25, 2017
38	38	"Linda se escapa con Bruno"	July 26, 2017
39	39	"Julieta se siente preparada para ser mamá"	July 27, 2017
40	40	"Gabriel defiende a Daniela"	July 28, 2017
41	41	"Daphne regresa a la vida de Juan Pablo"	July 31, 2017
42	42	"Julieta tiene un ataque de celos"	August 1, 2017
43	43	"Julieta tiene a Blanca de su lado"	August 2, 2017
44	44	"Julieta vuelve a sentirse insegura"	August 3, 2017
45	45	"Blanca aprende a manejar"	August 4, 2017
46	46	"Julieta se pone nerviosa por su boda"	August 7, 2017
47	47	"Julieta sufre un aborto"	August 8, 2017
48	48	"Blanca se entera que ya no será abuela"	August 9, 2017
49	49	"Julieta y Robert sufren la muerte de su bebé"	August 10, 2017
50	50	"Julieta se entera que no podrá tener hijos"	August 11, 2017
51	51	"Xavi comienza a sentir amor por Marisol"	August 14, 2017
52	52	"Julieta piensa en dejar a Robert"	August 15, 2017
53	53	"Julieta se va de la casa"	August 16, 2017
54	54	"Juan Pablo sufre por su separación"	August 17, 2017
55	55	"Juan Pablo recuerda quién lo abandonó"	August 18, 2017
56	56	"Julieta cancela su boda"	August 21, 2017
57	57	"Ana confiesa su gran secreto"	August 22, 2017
58	58	"Julieta se reencuentra con su papá"	August 23, 2017
59	59	"Julieta sorprende a Bruno con Linda"	August 24, 2017
60	60	"Juan Pablo le pone un alto a Daphne"	August 25, 2017
61	61	"Tulio está dispuesto a proteger a Ana"	August 28, 2017
62	62	"Daniela y Gabriel ya son novios"	August 29, 2017
63	63	"Eugenio conoce el secreto de Ana"	August 30, 2017
64	64	"Ana revela a Imelda su culpa"	August 31, 2017
65	65	"La familia Musi conoce a Daniela"	September 1, 2017
66	66	"La vida de Imelda corre peligro"	September 4, 2017
67	67	"Linda y Bruno se dan otra oportunidad"	September 5, 2017
68	68	"Julieta se está encariñando con David"	September 6, 2017
69	69	"Julieta le propone matrimonio a Juan Pablo"	September 7, 2017
70	70	"Blanca quiere organizar la boda"	September 8, 2017
71	71	"Despedida de solteros"	September 11, 2017
72	72	"Julieta y Robert se casan"	September 12, 2017
73	73	"Blanca se va de la casa"	September 13, 2017
74	74	"Daniela acepta casarse con Gabriel"	September 14, 2017
75	75	"Blanca decide cambiar su vida"	September 15, 2017
76	76	"Julieta defiende a Blanca"	September 18, 2017
77	77	"Julieta quiere ser mamá"	September 21, 2017
78	78	"Enzo está interesado Amalia"	September 21, 2017
79	79	"Eugenio piensa reconquistar a Blanca"	September 22, 2017
80	80	"Julieta quiere adoptar a David"	September 22, 2017
81	81	"Daniela ve a Gabriel con otra mujer"	September 25, 2017
82	82	"La adopción de David está en peligro"	September 26, 2017
83	83	"Eugenio cree que Blanca está secuestrada"	September 27, 2017
84	84	"Bienvenido a casa Dave"	September 28, 2017
85	85	"Los Mussi piden ayuda a Daniela"	September 29, 2017
86	86	"Daniela rescata a Gabriel"	October 2, 2017
87	87	"Polita se reencuentra con su mamá"	October 3, 2017
88	88	"Gabriel pide la mano de Daniela"	October 4, 2017
89	89	"La mamá de David regresó"	October 5, 2017
90	90	"Julieta está dispuesta a todo por David"	October 6, 2017
91	91	"Daniela y Gabriel se casarán en dos mes"	October 9, 2017
92	92	"La familia Córcega recibe a los Cooper"	October 10, 2017
93	93	"Los Córcega están celosos"	October 11, 2017
94	94	"Blanca y Eugenio tienen una cita romántica"	October 12, 2017
95	95	"El primer viaje de la familia Cooper Aguilar"	October 13, 2017
96	96	"Ana sufre un terrible accidente"	October 16, 2017
97	97	"Julieta está embarazada... ¡otra vez!"	October 17, 2017
98	98	"Ana recibe el perdón de Blanca"	October 18, 2017
99	99	"Daniela y Gabriel cancelan su boda"	October 19, 2017
100	100	"Daniela y Gabriel tienen una boda sorpresa"	October 20, 2017
101	101	"Julieta es mamá de una niña"	October 22, 2017
102	102	"Julieta y Juan Pablo inician una nueva vida"	October 22, 2017

=== Season 2: Mi marido tiene más familia (2018) ===
No. overall	No. in season	Title	Original release date	Mexico viewers (millions)
103	1	"Julieta conoce a Susana Córcega, su nueva jefa"	9 July 2018	3.3
104	2	"Canuto confiesa que tiene otra familia"	10 July 2018	3.3
105	3	"Julieta debe separarse de Blanquita"	11 July 2018	3.0
106	4	"Imelda descubre que Canuto está en Oaxaca"	12 July 2018	3.4
107	5	"Pancho López llega al edificio Córcega"	13 July 2018	3.2
108	6	"Robert descubre que Canuto es su abuelo"	16 July 2018	3.3
109	7	"Imelda ya no puede escapar del pasado"	17 July 2018	3.7
110	8	"Blanca intenta averiguar el secreto de Pancho"	18 July 2018	3.4
111	9	"Imelda le pide a Robert que respete su pasado"	19 July 2018	2.9
112	10	"Tito se reencuentra con sus hijos"	20 July 2018	3.3
113	11	"Dave está apunto de morir"	23 July 2018	3.2
114	12	"Julieta descubre que Susana es parte de su familia"	24 July 2018	3.0
115	13	"Catalina pone en su lugar a Susana"	25 July 2018	3.2
116	14	"Susana y Pancho casi tienen un accidente"	26 July 2018	3.5
117	15	"Susana se entera que Canuto está enfermo"	27 July 2018	3.0
118	16	"Robert promete unir a la familia Córcega"	30 July 2018	3.3
119	17	"Imelda está apunto de confesar su secreto"	31 July 2018	3.2
120	18	"Susana escucha una fuerte confesión de su padre"	1 August 2018	3.0
121	19	"Imelda confiesa que Canuto está vivo"	2 August 2018	3.4
122	20	"Susana acepta que Julieta es su sobrina política"	3 August 2018	3.0
123	21	"Susana no está dispuesta a convivir con Julieta"	6 August 2018	3.6
124	22	"Crisanta se entera que Canuto tiene otra familia"	7 August 2018	3.1
125	23	"Crisanta le exige a Canuto que le diga la verdad"	8 August 2018	3.0
126	24	"Susana decide enfrentar a la familia de Imelda"	9 August 2018	3.4
127	25	"Linda regresa a Oaxaca"	10 August 2018	3.1
128	26	"Imelda descubre que Crisanta es su rival"	13 August 2018	2.8
129	27	"Axel está a punto de atropellar a Linda"	14 August 2018	2.8
130	28	"Robert le pide a Pancho que se aleje de su familia"	15 August 2018	2.8
131	29	"Julieta le pide a su mamá que se vaya de la casa"	16 August 2018	2.9
132	30	"Robert estalla en celos por culpa de Vicente"	17 August 2018	2.8
133	31	"Susana le exige a Canuto que elija con qué familia quiere estar"	20 August 2018	2.9
134	32	"Canuto muere rodeado de su familia"	21 August 2018	2.7
135	33	"Susana se culpa por la muerte de padre"	22 August 2018	2.9
136	34	"Tulio cree que Crisanta y Susana les podrían quitar el edificio"	23 August 2018	2.9
137	35	"Tulio está a punto de traicionar a su familia"	24 August 2018	2.5
138	36	"Temo reconoce sus sentimientos por Ari"	27 August 2018	2.7
139	37	"Julieta descubre que Temo está enamorado de Aristóteles"	28 August 2018	2.7
140	38	"Daniela quiere separarse de Gabriel"	29 August 2018	2.9
141	39	"La verdadera mamá de David regresa"	30 August 2018	3.0
142	40	"Gabriel cae en una fuerte depresión"	31 August 2018	2.7
143	41	"Daniela y Gabriel deciden separarse"	3 September 2018	3.0
144	42	"Catalina quiere trabajar con Susana"	4 September 2018	2.8
145	43	"Yela pone a Dave en contra de Julieta"	5 September 2018	3.3
146	44	"Linda y Axel aceptan que están enamorados"	6 September 2018	2.5
147	45	"Robert rescata a Frida y Lupita"	7 September 2018	2.6
148	46	"Daniela se enfrenta con Ignacio"	10 September 2018	3.0
149	47	"Julieta y Robert tienen una noche romántica"	11 September 2018	3.0
150	48	"Robert le confiesa a David que su papá biológico está en la carcel"	12 September 2018	2.7
151	49	"Julieta inscribe a Daniela y Gabriel en "Reality de amor""	13 September 2018	2.7
152	50	"Julieta y Robert conocen al papá de David"	14 September 2018	2.8
153	51	"Pancho le confiesa a Susana cómo murió Rebeca"	17 September 2018	2.8
154	52	"El #TeamOsos va con todo al "Reality del amor""	18 September 2018	2.9
155	53	"Fernando sale de la cárcel dispuesto a conocer a David"	19 September 2018	2.9
156	54	"Daniela y Gabriel entran al "Reality de amor""	20 September 2018	3.0
157	55	"Temo le confiesa a Pancho que es gay"	21 September 2018	2.8
158	56	"Blanca secuestra a Julieta"	24 September 2018	2.8
159	57	"Fernando peleará por la custodia de David"	25 September 2018	3.3
160	58	"Daniela está embarazada"	26 September 2018	3.3
161	59	"Gabriel se decepciona tras saber que no será papá"	27 September 2018	3.1
162	60	"Julieta y Robert enfrentan un juicio por la custodia de David"	28 September 2018	3.0
163	61	"Julieta y Robert deben separarse de David"	1 October 2018	3.0
164	62	"Pancho le declara su amor a Susana"	2 October 2018	2.9
165	63	"Susana peleará por la herencia de Canuto"	3 October 2018	2.8
166	64	"El Team Osos sale del Reality de amor"	4 October 2018	2.7
167	65	"Polita sale en defensa de Aristóteles"	5 October 2018	2.8
168	66	"Robert explota en contra de Julieta"	8 October 2018	3.0
169	67	"Polita decide divorciarse de Audifaz"	9 October 2018	2.9
170	68	"Robert acepta irse a África"	10 October 2018	3.2
171	69	"David regresa a casa de Julieta y Robert"	11 October 2018	3.3
172	70	"Julieta y Robert aceptan vivir en casa de Blanca"	12 October 2018	3.1
173	71	"Imelda corre a Julieta de su casa"	15 October 2018	3.2
174	72	"Aris impide que Temo regrese a Toluca"	16 October 2018	3.4
175	73	"Robert inicia su plan para reconquistar a Julieta"	17 October 2018	3.5
176	74	"Susana y Pancho recuperan a Sebastián"	18 October 2018	3.1
177	75	"Susana renuncia al amor de Pancho"	19 October 2018	3.1
178	76	"Linda y Axel deciden luchar contra el rechazo de su familia"	22 October 2018	3.0
179	77	"Axel le propone a Linda vivir juntos"	23 October 2018	3.1
180	78	"Julieta está al borde de la muerte"	24 October 2018	3.0
181	79	"Susana se hace responsable por el accidente de Julieta"	25 October 2018	3.0
182	80	"Julieta da una esperanza de vida"	26 October 2018	2.9
183	81	"Julieta despierta del coma"	29 October 2018	2.9
184	82	"Los Osos van a ser papás"	30 October 2018	3.3
185	83	"Polita y Audifaz firman el divorcio"	31 October 2018	3.0
186	84	"Eugenio padece Alzheimer"	1 November 2018	2.7
187	85	"Susana y Pancho tienen una cita romántica"	2 November 2018	2.9
188	86	"Diego y Temo ya son novios"	5 November 2018	3.2
189	87	"Guido destruye a "vanidoso" y culpa a Hermoso"	6 November 2018	3.5
190	88	"Aris y Diego pelean por Temo"	7 November 2018	3.7
191	89	"¿Daniela perderá a sus bebés?"	8 November 2018	3.1
192	90	"Eugenio le confiesa a su familia que padece de Alzheimer"	9 November 2018	3.2
193	91	"Susana acepta casarse con Pancho"	12 November 2018	3.1
194	92	"Temo termina con Diego"	13 November 2018	3.0
195	93	"El amor unió a Aristemo"	14 November 2018	3.3
196	94	"Massimo nombra a Gabriel como su heredero"	15 November 2018	3.4
197	95	"La despedida de solteros de Pancho y Susana"	16 November 2018	3.1
198	96	"Aris y Temo se meten en problemas con la policía"	19 November 2018	3.7
199	97	"Gabriel enfrenta a Guido"	20 November 2018	3.1
200	98	"Gabriel muere después del nacimiento de sus hijos"	21 November 2018	3.8
201	99	"La familia se une para darle el último adiós a Gabriel"	22 November 2018	3.5
202	100	"Massimo hereda sus bienes a los hijos de Gabriel"	23 November 2018	3.4
203	101	"Neto es el nuevo gerente de la mezcalería de Massimo"	26 November 2018	3.7
204	102	"Neto es deportado de Estados Unidos"	27 November 2018	3.7
205	103	"Neto y sus hijos empiezan una nueva vida en México"	28 November 2018	3.4
206	104	"Massimo no quiere ayudar a Neto"	29 November 2018	3.2
207	105	"Yolo es la nueva vecina de Aris"	30 November 2018	2.9
208	106	"Temo y Yolo, la pelea por Aris comienza"	3 December 2018	3.4
209	107	"Yolo organiza una fiesta en el edificio Córcega"	4 December 2018	3.4
210	108	"Doña Imelda le exige a Neto que se vaya del edificio"	5 December 2018	2.9
211	109	"El destino insiste unir a Grecia y Neto"	6 December 2018	3.2
212	110	"Blanca hace una promesa de amor"	7 December 2018	2.9
213	111	"Yolo besa a Aris, ¿será el fin de ArisTemo?"	10 December 2018	3.6
214	112	"Imelda y Crisanta descubren que comparaten al mismo hombre... ¡otra vez!"	11 December 2018	3.6
215	113	"Eugenio sospecha que Neto es su hijo"	12 December 2018	3.1
216	114	"Guido confiesa uno de sus crímines"	13 December 2018	3.0
217	115	"Ernesto Rey podría ser hijo de Audifaz"	14 December 2018	3.2
218	116	"Susana y Pancho ya son marido y mujer"	17 December 2018	3.5
219	117	"Blanca se entera que Eugenio podría ser padre de Neto"	18 December 2018	3.4
220	118	"ArisTemo sella su amor con un tatuaje"	19 December 2018	3.3
221	119	"La Navidad llega al edificio Córcega"	20 December 2018	N/A
222	120	"Julieta y Robert mandan un mensaje de Navidad"	21 December 2018	N/A
223	121	"Guido secuestra a Hermoso"	24 December 2018	N/A
224	122	"La pastorela de los Córcega"	25 December 2018	N/A
225	123	"Todos los Córcega pasan juntos la Navidad"	26 December 2018	N/A
226	124	"¿La tropa descubre la fábrica de Santa?"	27 December 2018	N/A
227	125	"El fantasma de la Navidad aparece en el edificio Córcega"	28 December 2018	N/A
228	126	"Linda está embarazada"	31 December 2018	N/A
229	127	"ArisTemo busca el regalo perfecto de año nuevo"	1 January 2019	N/A
230	128	"ArisTemo gana el concurso de canto"	2 January 2019	N/A
231	129	"Yolo y sus hermanos recuerdan el día en que su mamá los abandonó"	3 January 2019	N/A
232	130	"Yolotol estaba embarazada cuando se fue de Oaxaca"	4 January 2019	3.2
233	131	"Neto descubre que Guido traicionó a Massimo"	7 January 2019	3.5
234	132	"Neto se entera que Eugenio podría ser su padre"	8 January 2019	3.8
235	133	"Aris debe elegir entre Temo y su carrera"	9 January 2019	3.6
236	134	"Pancho se transforma en un hombre de negocios"	10 January 2019	3.9
237	135	"Polita pierde la patria potestad de Arquimedes"	11 January 2019	3.3
238	136	"Aris y Temo se reconcilian"	14 January 2019	3.5
239	137	"Aris le exige a Rufo que respete su relación con Temo"	15 January 2019	3.2
240	138	"Yolo pasa la noche con Guido"	16 January 2019	3.4
241	139	"Audifaz busca a Pancho para pedirle ayuda"	17 January 2019	3.5
242	140	"Pancho le quita autoridad a Susana en el trabajo"	18 January 2019	3.0
243	141	"Aristemo quiere que su primer beso sea especial"	21 January 2019	3.6
244	142	"Guido planea destruir a la familia de Neto"	22 January 2019	3.6
245	143	"Félix intenta ahogar a Grecia"	23 January 2019	3.6
246	144	"Daniela investiga sobre la muerte de Gabriel"	24 January 2019	3.6
247	145	"Neto se reencuentra con Ariana"	25 January 2019	3.4
248	146	"La cita especial de Aristemo"	28 January 2019	3.6
249	147	"Guido se venga de Aristemo"	29 January 2019	3.6
250	148	"Aris tiene una esperanza de volver a caminar"	30 January 2019	3.7
251	149	"Aris se prepara para una difícil rehabilitación"	31 January 2019	3.6
252	150	"Yolo no acepta que Neto sea novio de Grecia"	1 February 2019	3.3
253	151	"Audifaz y Eduardo se enfrentan por el amor de Polita"	4 February 2019	3.5
254	152	"Andy y Santi arruinan "La flor más bella de Oaxaca""	5 February 2019	3.7
255	153	"Neto y Eugenio confirman que no son familia"	6 February 2019	3.6
256	154	"Carlos sospecha que Gabriel fue envenenado"	7 February 2019	3.6
257	155	"Neto descubre que Yolo es novia de Guido"	8 February 2019	3.6
258	156	"Daniela se entera que Gabriel fue envenenado"	11 February 2019	3.3
259	157	"Neto quiere impedir que Yolo escape con Guido"	12 February 2019	3.8
260	158	"Daniela logra vengar la muerte de Gabriel"	13 February 2019	4.2
261	159	"¿Imelda es otra víctima de Guido?"	14 February 2019	3.7
262	160	"Los Oppas se reencuentran con la familia"	15 February 2019	3.9
263	161	"¿Robert siente celos de Neto?"	18 February 2019	3.8
264	162	"Julieta se enfrenta con Pancho por la vicepresidencia"	19 February 2019	3.8
265	163	"Guido pasará el resto de su vida en la cárcel"	20 February 2019	4.2
266	164	"Massimo le propone matrimonio a Doña Imelda"	21 February 2019	4.1
267	165	"Aris y Temo deben separarse"	22 February 2019	4.0
268	166	"El primer beso de Aristemo"	24 February 2019	3.9
269	167	"El amor y la familia nunca terminan"	24 February 2019	3.9

== Special ==
Title	Original release date
"Mi marido tiene familia en concierto"	October 28, 2017
Special that features performances of the musical themes of the telenovela and relevant scenes of each characters.
