= José Pablo Minor =

Mexican actor, TV host and model

- Born: José Pablo Minor Medrano; March 23, 1991 (age 35); Cancún, Quintana Roo, Mexico
- Education: Centro de Educación Artística
- Occupations: Actor, TV host and model
- Years active: 2012–present
- Height: 1.86 m (6 ft 1 in)
- Title: Mr World Mexico 2014

José Pablo Minor Medrano (born March 23, 1991) is a Mexican actor, TV host and model. He represented Mexico to attend Mister World 2014 contest in Torbay, England, where he finished as second runner-up.

== Education ==
Minor was born March 23, 1991 in Cancún, Quintana Roo. He began his modeling career at the age of 13. Minor later trained as an actor at Televisa's Centro de Educación Artística (CEA), marking the start of his professional pursuits in the industry. He briefly studied commercial piloting but chose to focus on modeling and acting instead.

== Career ==
In 2014, Minor earned second place in Mr World Mexico. Because the original winner was unable to compete due to an injury sustained in an accident, he represented Mexico at Mister World 2014, held Torbay, England on June 15, 2014. Minor finished the competition in third place.

During his studies at the CEA, he acted in various school plays and appeared in several projects produced by Televisa, including Miss XV and Mentir para Vivir.

In October 2013, he was announced as a cast member in the comedy telenovela, Qué pobres tan ricos. The telenovela was produced by Rosy Ocampo and aired on Canal de las Estrellas in Mexico from 13 November 2013, to 29 June 2014.

His participation in producer Pedro Damián's remake, Muchacha italiana viene a casarse, was confirmed in August 2014. He played "Gael Ángeles". Filming began in early September at Televisa San Ángel in Mexico City. The telenovela premiered on Canal de las Estrellas on 20 October 2014.

In July 2014, he began co-hosting Zona Trendy Mexico, a young-adult–targeted series, which is produced by and aired weeknights on E! Latin America. The series is filmed at various Mexico City locations and premiered in Mexico on 23 July 2014.

In 2015, Minor was cast in the telenovela drama, Pasión y poder, a remake of the 1988 Mexican telenovela of the same name. The telenovela premiered on Canal de las Estrellas on 5 October 2015. On 17 April 2016, Minor won "Mejor Actor Co-estelar" at the 2016 Premios TVyNovelas awards show.

Following Pasión y poder, Minor was cast in the romantic-comedy film Plan virgen. The film was expected to begin filming in July 2016, but production was delayed for several months. Filming finally began in mid-December 2016 and was expected to last until late-January 2017. The film is now called Plan V. Filming was conducted in Guadalajara and Mexico City. The film was expected to be released in February 2018.

Minor obtained a role in the mini series, Sin rastro de ti, which began production in early July 2016 in Mexico City. The series consists of sixteen episodes and began airing on 1 August 2016 in Mexico.

== Personal life ==
He was in a relationship with actress Natasha Dupeyrón, whom he met through friends when he was a student at the CEA, from 2011 until late 2015. Minor confirmed his breakup from Dupeyron in February 2016.

In mid-August 2016, he travelled to Chiang Mai, Thailand, where he volunteered at an elephant sanctuary. Later, he lived in Nepal and taught English classes to schoolchildren. His volunteer trip ended in October 2016 and he returned to Mexico City.

He previously resided in Mexico City until 2023. As May of the same year, Minor lived in Paris.

== Filmography ==
=== Television ===
Year	Title	Role
1991	Muchachitas	Baby
2012	Miss XV	Antonio Hernández
2013	Gossip Girl: Acapulco	Ricardo Ruíz De Hinojosa
2013	La tempestad	Samuel
2013	Como dice el dicho	José María / Roberto
2013–2014	Qué pobres tan ricos	Tato
2014–2015	Muchacha italiana viene a casarse	Gael Ángeles
2015–2016	Pasión y poder	David Gómez Luna
2016	Sin rastro de ti	Luis Lara
2017	Enamorándome de Ramón	Santiago Iriarte
2017–2019	Mi marido tiene familia	Gabriel Musi Lozano
2019	Los Espookys	Juan Carlos / Juan Pablo
2019	Cuna de lobos	Miguel Terranova
2022	La mujer del diablo	Diego Carvajal
2024–2025	El ángel de Aurora	Demián Morga
2025	Los hilos del pasado	Alonso
2027	Luz de mis noches	Bernardo Valencia "Lobo"

== Awards and nominations ==
Year	Award	Category	Works	Result
2016	TVyNovelas Awards	Best Co-lead Actor	Pasión y poder	Won
2017	TVyNovelas Awards	Best Young Actor	Sin rastro de ti	Nominated

Awards and achievements
Preceded by (Republic of Ireland) Leo Delaney	Mister World 2nd Runner-up; 2014	Succeeded by (Mexico) Aldo Esparza
Preceded by Alejandro Valencia (Resigned)	Mr World Mexico (Assumed); 2014	Succeeded by Aldo Esparza
