= Alejandro Valencia =

Mexican actor and model

- Born: Jonathan Alejandro Villanueva Valencia; February 28, 1991 (age 35); Ario de Rosales, Michoacán, Mexico
- Education: Universidad Michoacana de San Nicolás de Hidalgo
- Occupations: Actor and model
- Height: 1.85 m (6 ft 1 in)
- Beauty pageant titleholder
- Hair color: Black
- Eye color: Hazel
- Major competitions: Mr Model Mexico 2013; (Winner); Mister International 2014; (Top 10); El Modelo México 2014; (Winner; Resigned)

Jonathan Alejandro Villanueva Valencia is Mexican actor, model and beauty pageant titleholder who was crowned Mr Model Mexico. He became Mexico's representative to Mister International 2014 and finished in the Top 10.

== Life and career ==
Valencia born in the small city of Ario de Rosales, he made his television career start after winning the Mr Model Mexico 2013 contest, appearing in a number of episodes of Como dice el dicho. And upon returning from the Mister International 2014 competition in which he placed among the Top 10 finishers held in Seoul, Korea. Graduate of Televisa's Centro de Educación Artística began obtaining more exposure in prime-time Mexican telenovelas. Valencia was also won to represent his country in Mister World 2014, but due to an injury during one of his filming jobs, he was replaced by José Pablo Minor, who eventually ended as the first runner-up in that international event.

Awards and achievements
Preceded by Hans Briseño	Mr Model Mexico; 2014	Succeeded by Alejandro Ruíz
Preceded by Enrique Mayagoitia	El Modelo México (Resigned); 2014	Succeeded by José Pablo Minor (Assumed)
