= Andrés Briseño =

Mexican model and pageant titleholder

- Born: Andrés Briseño Briseño; November 19, 2004 (age 21); Mazatlán, Sinaloa, Mexico
- Education: Autonomous University of Sinaloa
- Occupation: Model
- Height: 1.85 m (6 ft 1 in)
- Beauty pageant titleholder
- Title: Mister International 2026; Mister International Mexico 2026
- Major competitions: Mr Model México 2026; (Winner – Mister International Mexico); Mister International 2026; (Winner)

Andrés Briseño Briseño is a Mexican model and beauty pageant titleholder who was crowned Mister International 2026 on September 26, 2026 in Bangkok, Thailand. Representing Mexico, he became the first Mexican to win the Mister International title.

== Early life and education ==
Briseño was born November 19, 2004 in Mazatlán, Sinaloa, Mexico. He studies law at the Autonomous University of Sinaloa and has a background in athletics. His sporting activities have included baseball, archery, basketball, American football, swimming, tennis, and golf.

== Pageantry ==
=== Mr Model México 2026 ===
Briseño represented Sinaloa in the 14th edition of Mr Model México 2026. He finished as the national winner and subsequently received the Mister International Mexico 2026 title, qualifying him to represent Mexico at Mister International.

Prior to the international competition, Briseño discussed his preparation for the competition, which included physical training, runway presentation, public speaking, reading, and improving his English-language skills.

=== Mister International 2026 ===
Briseño represented Mexico at Mister International 2026, the 18th edition of the international men's beauty pageant. The final was held on September 26, 2026, at MCC Hall of The Mall Lifestore Bangkapi in Bangkok, Thailand. The competition featured representatives from 52 countries and territories.

During the competition, Briseño participated in preliminary events including the national costume, swimwear, and evening-wear competitions. For the national costume presentation, he represented Mexico in a traditional charro-inspired outfit.

At the final, Briseño was crowned Mister International 2026, succeeding Kirk Bondad of the Philippines, who won the title in 2025. His victory marked the first time that Mexico had won the Mister International title.

Awards and achievements
Preceded by (Philippines) Kirk Bondad	Mister International; 2026	Succeeded by Incumbent
Preceded by Willy Inurreta	Mister International Mexico; 2026	Succeeded by Incumbent
