= Neil Perez =

Filipino actor & male pageant winner

- Perez in 2015
- Born: Mariano Perez Flormata Jr. July 26, 1985 (age 41); Manila, Philippines
- Education: Manuel L. Quezon University
- Occupations: Police staff sergeant; aviation security group; model
- Height: 5 ft 11 in (1.80 m)
- Beauty pageant titleholder
- Title: Mister International Philippines 2014; Mister International 2014
- Hair color: Black
- Eye color: Brown
- Major competitions: Misters of Filipinas 2014 (Winner – Mister International Philippines 2014); Mister International 2014 (Winner)
- Police career
- Service: Philippine National Police
- Divisions: AVSECOM
- Service years: 2010s–present
- Rank: Police Staff Sergeant
- Website: http://mistersofthephilippines.com/

Mariano Perez Flormata Jr. (born July 26, 1985), more popularly known by his screen name Neil Perez (Tagalog: [niːl pɛˈrɛz]), is a Filipino actor, model, police officer, and male beauty pageant titleholder who was crowned Mister International 2014. He is the first Filipino Mister International in the history of the competition.

== Early life and education ==
Perez was born on July 26, 1985 in Manila, Philippines. He attended the Manuel L. Quezon University and graduated with a degree in criminology.

== Pageantry ==
=== Misters of the Filipinas 2014 ===
Perez won the title of Mister International Philippines 2014 at the Misters of Filipinas 2014 pageant on September 7, 2014. He bested 25 other candidates. During the competition, he was conferred six (6) special awards: Mister Photogenic, Best in Swimwear, Mister Unisilver, Mister Informatics, Mister Multidestination, and Crossfit Challenge Winner by Crossfit Halcyon'. Perez represented the Philippines in the Mister International 2014 competition held at Hotel Inter-Burgo Ballroom, Ansan, Seoul, South Korea on February 14, 2015 and won the title.

=== Mister International 2014 ===
Perez was crowned Mister International 2014 at Hotel Inter-Burgo Ballroom, Ansan, Seoul, South Korea on February 14, 2015. He also won 2nd runner-up in the national costume competition. He offered his victory in honor of the 44 Special Action Force crew who were killed in the Mamasapano clash on January 25, 2015.

During his reign, Perez traveled to the Czech Republic, Thailand, Myanmar, Cambodia, Laos, France, Macedonia, Gibraltar, Uzbekistan, Russia, the Netherlands, and South Korea, besides traveling across his native Philippines.

== Filmography ==
=== TV appearances ===
On September 27, 2014, Perez portrayed himself on GMA 7's drama anthology Magpakailanman entitled “Poging Policeman: the Mariano Flormata Jr. Story” (actor Kristofer Martin portrayed Perez as a young adult). In 2015, he played teacher for TV5's Wattpad mini drama, opposite Isabella de Leon. He was also included in the Third Batch of Lucky Stars for the Kapamilya, Deal or No Deal; he was keeper of briefcase number 18. He got a chance to play on April 15, 2015 in the same show, where he took the banker's offer of PhP105,000. He appeared on Eat Bulaga's #AldubMostAwaitedDate episode, and on the September 20, 2015 episode of Sunday PINASaya's Kantaserye presents "Sari-Sari Luv" as Col. Tim, to promote the series Princess in the Palace which premiered on September 21, 2015.

Year	Title	Role	Notes
2014	Magpakailanman	Himself	Episode: "Poging Policeman: the Mariano Flormata Jr. Story"
2015	Wattpad Presents	Prof. Viel	Episode: "My Ex Professor"
2015	Kapamilya, Deal or No Deal	Briefcase Number 18	Lucky Star Batch 3
2015	Princess in the Palace	Col. Tim	

== Other ==
Perez was also featured in the May 2015 issue of Men's Health Asia magazine, covered by Filipino actor James Reid.

Awards and achievements
Preceded by (Venezuela) José Anmer Paredes	Mister International	Succeeded by (Switzerland) Pedro Mendes
Preceded by Gil Wagas	Mister International Philippines	Succeeded by Reniel Villareal
