= Mr Model México 2025 =

13th edition of Mr Model México

- Date: July 18, 2025
- Presenters: Gustavo Manuel; Elena Roldan
- Venue: La Maraka, Benito Juárez, Mexico City
- Broadcaster: YouTube
- Entrants: 25
- Placements: 10
- Winner: Gabriel Alejandro Silva; Colima
- Congeniality: Ángel Grijalva; Sonora
- Photogenic: Ángel Grijalva; Sonora

Mr Model México 2025 is the 13th edition of the Mr Model México pageant, held on July 18, 2025 in La Maraka, Benito Juárez, Mexico City. The Mr Model México 2024 winners subsequently passed on their titles to their respective successors at the end of the event.

The competition is slated to select Mexico's representatives to various international male pageants, including Mister Global, Mister International, Manhunt International, and Caballero Universal.

== Results ==
=== Placements ===
Color keys

- Declared as winner
- Ended as runner-up or top 5/6 qualification
- Ended as one of the finalists or semifinalists
- Ended did not place

=== Mr Model México 2025 ===
Placement	Delegate	International Placement
Mister Global Mexico 2025	Colima – Gabriel Alejandro Silva	2nd Runner-up – Mister Global 2025
Mister International Mexico 2025	Veracruz – Willy Inurreta (assumed)	Top 10 – Mister International 2025
Mister International Mexico 2025	Mexico City - Jesús Cancino (resigned)	
Manhunt International Mexico 2026	Michoacán – Alan Estrada	Unplaced – Manhunt International 2026
Caballero Universal Mexico 2025	Oaxaca – Ulises Baños	Top 10 – Caballero Universal 2025
Top 10	Nuevo León – Manuel Salinas; Querétaro – Gabriel Paredes; San Luis Potosí – Alejandro Myers; Sonora – Ángel Grijalva; Yucatán – Fernando Iriarte	

=== Appointed ===
Placement	Delegate	International Placement
Manhunt International Mexico 2025	Yucatán – José Carlos Novelo	5th Runner-up – Manhunt International 2025

== Official Delegates ==
25 delegates competed for the title:

State	Delegate	Age	Height
Aguascalientes	Uziel Mireles Jiménez	23	1.80 m (5 ft 11 in)
Baja California Sur	Carlos Alberto Ruiz	31	1.80 m (5 ft 11 in)
Chiapas	Esaú Rafael Álvarez Delgado	27	1.80 m (5 ft 11 in)
Chihuahua	Adrián Chávez Valles	25	1.82 m (5 ft 11 1/2 in)
Mexico City	Jesús Gustavo Cancino	29	1.82 m (5 ft 11 1/2 in)
Colima	Gabriel Alejandro Silva Saucedo	23	1.86 m (6 ft 1 in)
Durango	Leonel Álvarez	29	1.80 m (5 ft 11 in)
Estado de México	Sergio Alonso Bríones Martínez	30	1.85 m (6 ft 1 in)
Guanajuato	Diego de la Paz Tapia	25	1.80 m (5 ft 11 in)
Guerrero	José Antonio Ayala Ortiz	24	1.80 m (5 ft 11 in)
Hidalgo	Brandon Millán Nava	22	1.80 m (5 ft 11 in)
Jalisco	Oliver Alejandro Valdez de la Torre	26	1.84 m (6 ft 1/2 in)
Michoacán	Alan Ramón Estrada Jiménez	24	1.87 m (6 ft 1 1/2 in)
Nayarit	Elmer Tovar	30	1.80 m (5 ft 11 in)
Nuevo León	Manuel Gilberto Garza Salinas	27	1.84 m (6 ft 1/2 in)
Oaxaca	Moisés Ulises Baños Salinas	31	1.80 m (5 ft 11 in)
Puebla	Jorge Iván Castillo Ortiz	24	1.82 m (5 ft 11 1/2 in)
Querétaro	Gabriel Paredes Fernández	33	1.83 m (6 ft 0 in)
San Luis Potosí	Alejandro Padilla Myers	28	1.90 m (6 ft 3 in)
Sinaloa	Ramiro Rentería Flores	29	1.85 m (6 ft 1 in)
Sonora	Sergio Ángel Castro Grijalva	26	1.88 m (6 ft 2 in)
Tamaulipas	Jorge Treviño	24	1.82 m (5 ft 11 1/2 in)
Veracruz	Guillermo Inurreta Del Cueto	21	1.86 m (6 ft 1 in)
Yucatán	Fernando Iriarte Ibarra	27	1.80 m (5 ft 11 in)
Zacatecas	Jhonnatan Bermúdez Sánchez	33	1.80 m (5 ft 11 in)
