= Gabriel Ortiz (model) =

Mexican model and male pageant titleholder

- Born: Gabriel Alejandro Ortiz Aguayo; August 16, 1995 (age 31); Armería, Colima, Mexico
- Education: Universidad Multitécnica Profesional
- Occupation: Model
- Height: 1.86 m (6 ft 1 in)
- Beauty pageant titleholder
- Hair color: Black
- Eye color: Hazel
- Major competitions: Mr Model Mexico 2019; (Winner); Mister Global 2021; (4th Runner-up); Mister World Mexico 2024; (2nd Runner-up)

Gabriel Alejandro Ortiz Aguayo is a Mexican model and beauty pageant titleholder who won Mr Model Mexico and represented his country at the Mister Global pageant, where he finished as fourth runner-up.

== Life and career ==
Ortiz was born on August 16, 1995 in Armería, Colima. He developed an interest in sports and fitness from an early age, particularly volleyball. While pursuing a law degree, he began participating in male pageants, combining his academic studies with professional modeling.

In 2019, Ortiz was awarded the title of Mr Model Mexico, this victory earned him the opportunity to represent Mexico internationally. He represented her country at the seventh edition of Mister Global pageant, held at Taksila Hotel in Maha Sarakham, Thailand on March 15, 2022, where he finished as fourth runner-up. After completing his pageant commitments, Ortiz graduated with a Bachelor of Law from Universidad Multitécnica Profesional.

Awards and achievements
Preceded by (Dominican Republic) Braulio Encarnación	Mister Global 4th Runner-up; 2021	Succeeded by (Vietnam) Lê Hữu Đạt
Preceded by Andrés Villegas	Mr Model Mexico; 2019	Succeeded by Ángel Garciglia
