= Mister International 2014 =

9th edition of the Mister International competition

- Neil Perez
- Date: 14 February 2015
- Venue: Grand Ballroom, Grand Hilton Seoul, Seoul, Korea
- Entrants: 29
- Placements: 15
- Debuts: Guam; Japan; Myanmar
- Withdrawals: Bolivia; Chile; Costa Rica; Dominican Republic; El Salvador; France; Haiti; Honduras; Netherlands; Nicaragua; Panama; Slovenia; Spain; United States; Venezuela
- Returns: Azerbaijan; Ecuador; Poland; Poland; Ukraine
- Winner: Neil Perez; Philippines
- Congeniality: David Angel (Colombia)
- Best National Costume: Shi Yu Quan (China)
- Photogenic: Masakazu Hashimoto (Japan)

Mister International 2014 was the 9th edition of the Mister International pageant. It was held on February 14, 2015 at the Grand Ballroom, Grand Hilton Seoul in Seoul, South Korea.

Jose Anmer Paredes of Venezuela crowned Neil Perez of the Philippines at the end of the event. This year, 29 contestants from around the world participated. It was the first time the Philippines won the pageant.

== Background ==
The Mister International 2014 finals in South Korea, originally scheduled for February 12, was postponed to February 14 due to the venue being unavailable, according to media reports. The pageant had initially been planned for October 2014, then moved to November 2014, before being rescheduled to February 2015.

== Results ==
=== Placements ===
This is the complete list of Mister International 2014 winners and their awards in order.

Winner

Placement	Contestant
Mister International 2014	Philippines – Neil Perez
1st runner-up	Lebanon – Rabih El Zein
2nd runner-up	Czech Republic – Tomáš Dumbrovský
3rd runner-up	Poland – Rafał Maślak
4th runner-up	Slovenia – Mitja Nadizar
Top 10	Brazil – Matheus Martins; Japan – Masakazu Hashimoto; South Korea – Park Young-ho; Mexico – Alejandro Valencia; Thailand – Vittawat Srikes
Top 15	Colombia – David Angel; Guam – Richard Johnson; Indonesia – Kevin Hendrawan; Myanmar – Aung Chan Mya; Puerto Rico – Christian Ortíz

==== Special awards ====
Awards	Contestant	Ref.
Most Stylish Award	South Korea – Park Youngho	
Best National Costume	China - Shi Yu Quan	
People's Choice Award	Poland - Rafał Maślak	
Mister Photogenic	Japan - Masakazu Hashimoto	
Mister Congeniality	Colombia - David Angel	

== Contestants ==
Over 29 contestants competed.

Countries/Territories	Name(s)
Australia	Marco Sepulveda
Azerbaijan	Ali Zahirli
Bahamas	Kenneth Kerr
Brazil	Matheus Martins
Canada	Dan Marana
China	Shi Yu Quan
Colombia	David Angel
Czech Republic	Tomáš Dumbrovský
Ecuador	Nicolas Lopez Zamora
Greece	Konstantinos Giagmouris
Guam	Richard Johnson
India	Parmeet Wahi
Indonesia	Kevin Hendrawan
Japan	Masakazu Hashimoto
Lebanon	Rabih El Zein
Malaysia	CJ Lee
Mexico	Alejandro Valencia
Myanmar	Aung Chan Mya
Peru	Bruno Yañez
Philippines	Neil Perez
Poland	Rafał Maślak
Puerto Rico	Christian Ortíz
Russia	Arseniy Potorchin
Singapore	Andy Wong
Slovenia	Mitja Nadiza
South Korea	Park Youngho
Sri Lanka	Tharshan Thiyagarajah
Thailand	Vittawat Srikes
Turkey	Eray Aydos
Ukraine	Bohdan Yusypchuk
