= Mister México 2024 =

5th edition of Mister México

- Date: 16 March 2024
- Presenters: Yoana Gutiérrez; Alejandro García
- Venue: Teatro Francisco Javier Clavijero, Puerto de Veracruz, Veracruz
- Broadcaster: MVS TV • Telemax
- Entrants: 32
- Placements: 15
- Winner: Alan Salazar Mexico City; Zait Reza Coahuila

Mister México 2024 was the fifth edition of the Mister México contest, held on 16 March in Puerto de Veracruz, Veracruz. Thirty-two candidates from Mexico competed to win the national title.

Two winners were titled at the end of the event. Aldo Esparza crowned his successor Alan Salazar of Mexico City as Mister World México 2024. Salazar represented Mexico at the Mister World 2024 contest in Bình Thuận, Vietnam on 23 November where he finished in the top 20.

Luis Cuadra crowned his successor Zait Reza of Coahuila as Mister Supranational México 2024. Reza represented Mexico at the Mister Supranational 2024 contest in Nowy Sącz, Poland on 4 July where he finished in the top 10, marking Mexico’s fourth consecutive placement.

== Results ==
=== Placements ===
Color keys

- Declared as winner
- Ended as runner-up or top 5/6 qualification
- Ended as one of the finalists or semifinalists
- Ended did not place

=== Mister World México ===
Placement	Contestant	International Placement
Mister World México 2024	Mexico City – Alan Salazar Casillas	Top 20 – Mister World 2024
1st Runner-up	Veracruz – Marco Ybarra Castillo	
2nd Runner-up	Colima – Gabriel Alejandro Ortiz	
Top 5	Michoacán – Rafael Hernández	Top 5 – Mister Model International 2024
Top 5	Querétaro – René Roy Mendívil	
Top 15	Aguascalientes – Victor Leyva; Baja California – Eli Zamora; Baja California Sur – Fernando Moreno; Chiapas – Brian Avelar; Durango – Kevin Lerma Valdivia; Guerrero – Bryan Vázquez Holguín; Nayarit – Alejandro Rivera Arroyo; Sonora – Jasiehl Tanoni; San Luis Potosí - Uziel Mireles Jiménez; Yucatán – Alberto Díaz Soria	

=== Mister Supranational México ===
Placement	Contestant	International Placement
Mister Supranational México 2024	Coahuila – Jairo Zait Villa Reza	Top 10 – Mister Supranational 2024
1st Runner-up	Sonora – Jasiehl Tanoni	
2nd Runner-up	Chiapas – Brian Avelar	
3rd Runner-up	Durango – Kevin Lerma Valdivia	
4th Runner-up	Baja California Sur – Fernando Moreno	
Top 15
Top 15	Guerrero – Bryan Vásquez Holguín	Top 10 – Mister Global 2024
Top 15	Aguascalientes – Victor Leyva; Baja California – Eli Zamora; Colima – Gabriel Alejandro Ortiz; Michoacán – Rafael Hernández; Nayarit – Alejandro Rivera Arroyo; Querétaro – René Roy Mendívil; San Luis Potosí - Uziel Mireles Jiménez; Veracruz – Marco Ybarra Castillo; Yucatán – Alberto Díaz Soria	

=== Awards ===
Category	Awards	Winner
MAIN AWARDS	Mister Top Model	Sonora – Jasiehl Tánori
MAIN AWARDS	Sports Challenge	Mexico City - Alan Salazar Casillas
MAIN AWARDS	Mister Talent	Yucatán – Alberto Díaz Soria
MAIN AWARDS	English Challenge	Veracruz – Marco Ybarra Castillo
MAIN AWARDS	Supra Chat	Querétaro – René Roy Mendívil
SPECIAL AWARDS	Fitness Body	Coahuila – Jairo Zait Villa Reza
SPECIAL AWARDS	Hombres de Acción	Michoacán – Rafael Hernández
SPECIAL AWARDS	Historia de México y Cultura General	Aguascalientes – Víctor Leyva

== Official Delegates ==
32 candidates competed for the title:

State	Candidate	Age	Height
Aguascalientes	Victor Leyva	34	1.80 m (5 ft 11 in)
Baja California	Eli Zamora	29	1.78 m (5 ft 10 in)
Baja California Sur	Fernando Moreno	28	1.92 m (6 ft 3 1/2 in)
Campeche	Ramón Ganzo Santini	33	1.81 m (5 ft 11 1/2 in)
Chiapas	Brian Avelar	24	1.86 m (6 ft 1 in)
Chihuahua	Ricardo Leaños	32	1.78 m (5 ft 10 in)
Mexico City	Alan Salazar Casillas	24	1.87 m (6 ft 1 1/2 in)
Coahuila	Jairo Zait Villa Reza	32	1.90 m (6 ft 3 in)
Colima	Gabriel Alejandro Ortiz	25	1.86 m (6 ft 1 in)
Durango	Kevin Lerma Valdivia	32	1.84 m (6 ft 1/2 in)
Estado de México	Edwin Valdovinos	21	1.96 m (6 ft 5 in)
Guanajuato	Fernando Barrera	25	1.92 m (6 ft 3 1/2 in)
Guerrero	Bryan Vázquez Holguín	24	1.90 m (6 ft 3 in)
Hidalgo	Eduardo Regnier	33	1.89 m (6 ft 2 1/2 in)
Jalisco	Juan Andrade Adame	26	1.87 m (6 ft 1 1/2 in)
Michoacán	Rafael Hernández	31	1.82 m (5 ft 11 1/2 in)
Morelos	Icker Jardon	26	1.87 m (6 ft 1 1/2 in)
Nayarit	Alejandro Rivera Arroyo	30	1.80 m (5 ft 11 in)
Nuevo León	Sergio Polanco	29	1.81 m (5 ft 11 1/2 in)
Oaxaca	Joshimar Cruz	29	1.83 m (6 ft 0 in)
Puebla	Maximiliano Villegas	30	1.78 m (5 ft 10 in)
Querétaro	René Roy Mendívil	25	1.90 m (6 ft 3 in)
Quintana Roo	Brandon Millan Nava	20	1.80 m (5 ft 11 in)
San Luis Potosí	Uziel Mireles Jiménez	21	1.80 m (5 ft 11 in)
Sinaloa	Alberto Ruíz	34	1.85 m (6 ft 1 in)
Sonora	Jasiehl Tánori	24	1.90 m (6 ft 3 in)
Tabasco	Ronaldo García Cardena	31	1.83 m (6 ft 0 in)
Tamaulipas	Fabián Velato	25	1.94 m (6 ft 4 1/2 in)
Tlaxcala	Antonio Exael Riverón	24	1.82 m (5 ft 11 1/2 in)
Veracruz	Marco Ybarra Castillo	27	1.83 m (6 ft 0 in)
Yucatán	José Alberto Díaz Soria	27	1.87 m (6 ft 1 1/2 in)
Zacatecas	Carlos Quezada	34	1.80 m (5 ft 11 in)

Notes

- Rafael Hernández placed as Top 5 in Mister Model International 2024 in Cartagena, Colombia.
- Gabriel Alejandro Ortiz placed as 4th Runner-up in Mister Global 2021 in Maha Sarakham, Thailand.
- Jairo Zait Villa Reza placed as 3rd Runner-up in Mister Tourism World 2021 in Santo Domingo, Dominican Republic.
