= Mister International (Thailand) =

International male beauty contest based in Thailand

- Type: International male beauty pageant
- Parent organization: Mister International Company, Ltd
- Headquarters: Bangkok, Thailand
- First edition: 2006; 20 years ago
- Most recent edition: 2026
- Current titleholder: Andrés Briseño; Mexico
- Founder: Alan Sim
- President: Pradit Pradinunt
- Vice President: Anthony Santana
- Chief Executive Officer: Jung-hoon "Ricky" Jeon
- Chief Operating Officer: Nicholo Paulo "Pawee" Ventura
- Language: English, Thai (since 2023)
- Website: www.misterinternational.org

Mister International is an international male beauty pageant that the Mister International Organization runs since 2006. It was Singapore-based, owned, and organized by its former president and late founder Alan Sim.

Following Sim's death, two new Mister International organizations emerged, one based in the Philippines, the other in Thailand. Since 2023, both organizations have conducted their own competitions and chosen their own Mister International winner.

The current Mister International is Andrés Briseño of Mexico, who was crowned on September 26, 2026, at the MCC Hall Bangkapi, in Bangkok, Thailand.

== History ==
=== 2006–2021 ===
Mister International Organization was Singapore-based, owned, and organized by its former president and late founder, Alan Sim, Since the first edition, 80 countries have sent their representative to this competition. The Mister International Organization licenses local organizations that wish to select the Mister International delegate for their country and approves the selection method for national contestants. Traditionally, Mister International lived in Singapore during his reign and was allowed to live anywhere in every country (hence the name Mister International).

=== 2022–present ===
Since Sim's death on October 12, 2022, two Mister International organizations emerged, with one being headquartered to Thailand and led by Pradit Pradinunt from October 31, 2022. For the first time in 16 years, the Mister International Organization will allow fathers, married, and divorced men to compete. A separate Mister International Organization based in the Philippines has been holding a pageant of the same name since 2023.

== Titleholders ==
Edition & Year	Date	Mister International	Runners-ups					Location Venue	No.	Ref.
Edition & Year	Date	Mister International	First	Second	Third	Fourth	Fifth	Location Venue	No.	Ref.
1st 2006	October 7, 2006	Wissam Hanna; Lebanon	Erbert Javier Delgado; Venezuela	Konstantinos Avrampos; Greece	Karlis Karolis; Latvia	Chaka Sedgwick; USA	Not awarded	Singapore	18	
2nd 2007	December 31, 2007	Alan Bianco Martini; Brazil	Oh Jong Sung; South Korea	Aristotelis Bolovinos; Greece	Alberto García Gómez; Venezuela	Bassel Mohammad Abou; Lebanon	Not awarded	Kuching, Malaysia	17	
3rd 2008	November 24, 2008	Ngô Tiến Đoàn; Vietnam	Mohamad Chamseddine; Lebanon	Zhang Lun Shuo; China	Mihovil Barun; Croatia	Vincent Cleuren; Netherlands	Not awarded	Tainan, Taiwan	30	
4th 2009	December 19, 2009	Bruno Kettels; Bolivia	Hector Soria; Spain	Marcelino Gebrayel; Lebanon	Maxime Thomasset; France	Sebastian Strzepka; Poland	Not awarded	Taichung, Taiwan	29	
5th 2010	November 30, 2010	Ryan Terry; Great Britain	Caio Lucius Ribeiro; Brazil	Luis Alberto Macías; Spain	Thomas Sebastian; Indonesia	Leodion Sulaj; Greece	Not awarded	Jakarta, Indonesia	40	
6th 2011	December 17, 2011	César Curti; Brazil	Martin Gardavsky; Czech Republic	Steven Yoswara; Indonesia	Le Khoi Nguyen; Vietnam	Marco Djelevic Virriat; Sweden	Not awarded	Bangkok, Thailand	33	
7th 2012	November 24, 2012	Ali Hammoud; Lebanon	Ron Teh; Singapore	Marko Sobot; Slovenia	Ricardo Magrino; Brazil	Ján Haraslín; Slovak Republic	Not awarded	Bangkok, Thailand	38	
8th 2013	November 21, 2013	José Anmer Paredes; Venezuela	Albern Sultan; Indonesia	Jhonatan Marko; Brazil	Hans Briseño; Mexico	Gil Wagas; Philippines	Antonin Beránek; Czech Republic	Jakarta, Indonesia	38	
9th 2014	February 14, 2015	Neil Perez; Philippines	Rabih El Zein; Lebanon	Tomas Dumbrovsky; Czech Republic	Rafał Maślak; Poland	Mitja Nadizar; Slovenia	Not awarded	Seoul, Korea	29	
10th 2015	November 30, 2015	Pedro Mendes; Switzerland	Anderson Tomazini; Brazil	Sang Jin Lee; South Korea	Julian Javier Torres; Panama	Jakub Kraus; Czech Republic	Not awarded	Manila, Philippines	36	
11th 2016	February 13, 2017	Paul Iskandar; Lebanon	Masaya Yamagishi; Japan	Vinicio Modolo; Italy	Not awarded			Bangkok, Thailand	35	
12th 2017	April 30, 2018	Seung Hwan Lee; South Korea	Manuel Molano; Colombia	Dwayne Geldenhuis; South Africa	Not awarded			Yangon, Myanmar	36	
13th 2018	February 25, 2019	Trịnh Văn Bảo; Vietnam	Francesco Piscitelli; Venezuela	Waikin Kwan; Hong Kong	Not awarded			Pasay City, Philippines	39	
2019–2021 Cancelled due to the COVID-19 pandemic.
14th 2022	October 30, 2022	Emmanuel Franco; Dominican Republic	Lukanand Kshetrimayum; India	Orangel Dirinot; Venezuela	Jason Li; Hong Kong	Myron Jude Ordillano; Philippines	Juan Pablo Colias; Spain	Quezon City, Philippines	35	
15th 2023	September 17, 2023	Thitisan Goodburn; Thailand	William Badell; Venezuela	Edward Ogunniya; Brazil	Not awarded			Bangkok, Thailand	36	
16th 2024	December 14, 2024	Nwajagu Samuel; Nigeria	Nguyễn Mạnh Lân; Vietnam	Glenn Victor Sutanto; Indonesia	Not awarded			Bangkok, Thailand	47	
17th 2025	September 25, 2025	Kirk Bondad; Philippines	Saadedine Hneineh; Lebanon	Seung Ho Choi; South Korea	Bethel Mbamara; Nigeria	Roberto Mena; Costa Rica	Kanapol Treesongkiat; Thailand	Nonthaburi, Thailand	42	
18th 2026	September 26, 2026	Andrés Briseño; Mexico	Ignacio Monclus; Spain	Gede Aiswarya Kartika; Indonesia	Doğukan Navdar; Turkey	Nguyễn Vũ Linh; Vietnam	Ravindu Wijesooriya; Sri Lanka	Bangkok, Thailand	52	

=== Country by number of wins ===
Country	Titles	Year
Lebanon	3	2006, 2012 ~~(Note: Lebanon's Ali Hammoud (Resigned) the position.)~~, 2016
Philippines	2	2014, 2025
Vietnam	2	2008, 2018
Brazil	2	2007, 2011
Mexico	1	2026
Nigeria	1	2024
Thailand	1	2023
Dominican Republic	1	2022
South Korea	1	2017
Switzerland	1	2015
Venezuela	1	2013
Singapore	1	2012 (Note: Singapore's Ron Teh (Assumed) the title.)
Great Britain	1	2010
Bolivia	1	2009

== Winners gallery ==
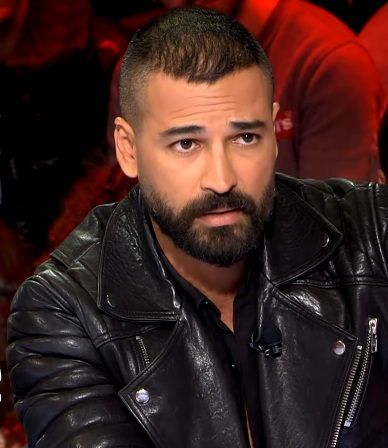
Mister International 2006
Wissam Hanna
Lebanon

Mister International 2014
Neil Perez
Philippines

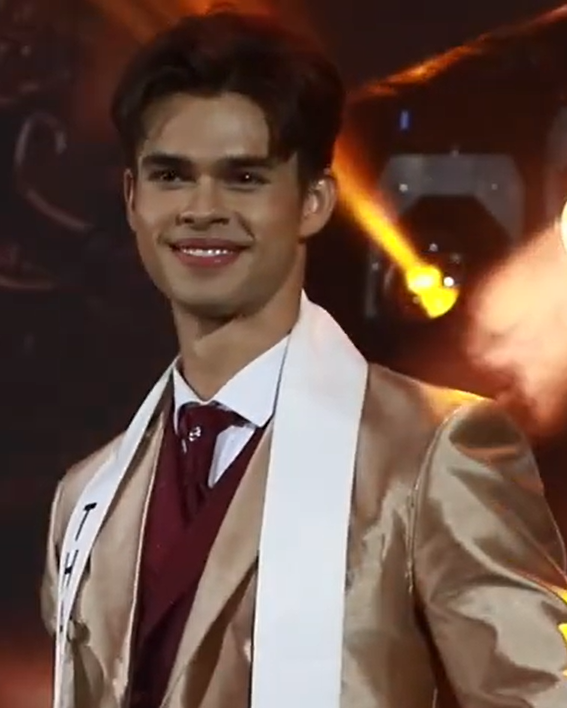
Mister International 2023
Kim Thitisan Goodburn
Thailand

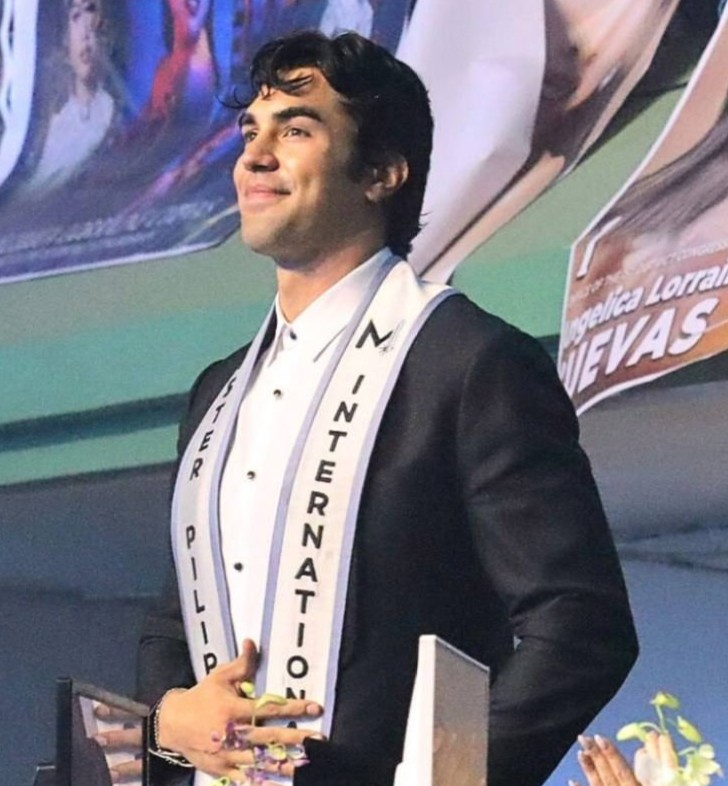
Mister International 2025
Kirk Bondad
Philippines

== First Mr. International ==
The first Mr. International, organized by India-based clothing company Graviera, was a male pageant first held in 1998 and was held annually in India until 2003, when it was staged in London. It has not been held since then and has been de facto replaced by Mister International. Entries have been cross-referenced with their participation in the Manhunt International, Mister Intercontinental, and Mister World pageants.

=== Titleholders ===
Edition	Year	Date	Mr. International	Runners-up		Location	Entrants	Ref.
Edition	Year	Date	Mr. International	First	Second	Location	Entrants	Ref.
1st	1998	October 31, 1998	Mario Carballo; Costa Rica	Hasan Yalnizoglu; Turkey	Tamme Boh Tjarks; Germany	Jaipur, India	23	
2nd	1999	October 30, 1999	Nadir Nery Djiukich; Venezuela	James Ghoril; Lebanon	Abhijit Sanyal; India	New Delhi, India	24	
3rd	2000	October 13, 2000	Aryan Vaid; India	Jorge Pascual; Mexico	Xu Chong; China	Jodhpur, India	25	
4th	2001	December 15, 2001	Alexander Aquino; Philippines	Anibal Martignani Pérez; Venezuela	Leroy Vissers; Holland	Udaipur, India	36	
5th	2002	October 26, 2002	Raghu Mukherjee; India	Julio César Cabrera Mendieta; Venezuela	Odysseus Karouis; Greece	New Delhi, India	26	
6th	2003	August 24, 2003	William Kelly; Sharjah, UAE	Rajneesh Duggal; India	Shaun Paul Cuthbert; Singapore	London, England	32	

- Note: In 2003 edition, three contestants came from United Arab Emirates, included Abu Dhabi, Dubai and Sharjah. William Kelly represented Sharjah and later won the title.

=== League tables ===
Countries/Territories by number of wins
Country/Territory	Titles	Year
India	2	2000, 2002
United Arab Emirates	1	2003
Philippines	1	2001
Venezuela	1	1999
Costa Rica	1	1998

Continents by number of wins
Continent	Titles	Years
Asia	4	2000, 2001, 2002, 2003
Americas	2	1998, 1999

Map of countries/territories by number of wins

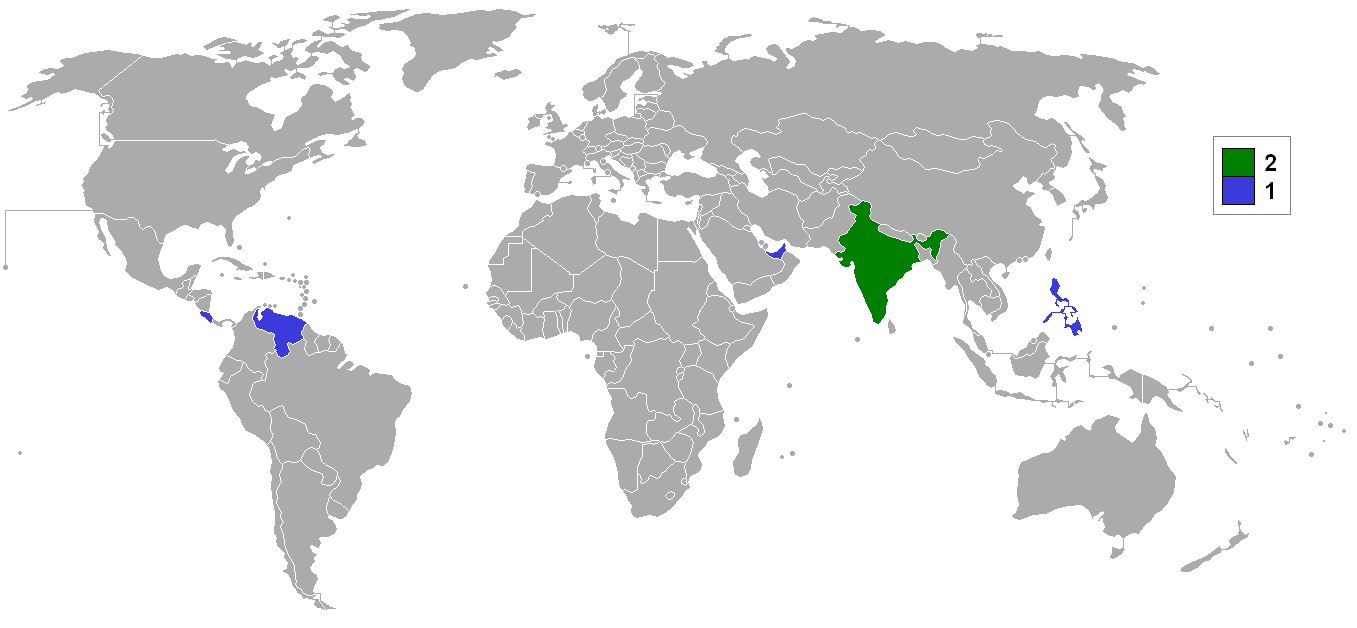
Map of countries and territories that have won Mr. International.
- Note: The winner of the 2003 edition, William Kelly, represented Sharjah, one of the emirates of the UAE. The crown is counted for the United Arab Emirates only, and not for Sharjah, since Sharjah is part of the UAE. This is reflected in the table.

== See also ==
- Mister World
- Manhunt International
- Mister Supranational
- Man of the World
- Mister Global
