= Mariana de la noche (Mexican TV series) =

Mexican telenovela

- Also known as: Mariana de la noche: Nadie puede saber la verdad
- Genre: Telenovela; Romance; Drama
- Created by: Delia Fiallo
- Written by: Liliana Abud; Dolores Ortega; Mauricio Aridjis
- Directed by: Miguel Córcega; Édgar Ramírez; Alberto Díaz
- Starring: Angélica Rivera; Jorge Salinas; Alejandra Barros; César Évora; Patricia Navidad; Adriana Fonseca; René Strickler; Alma Muriel
- Theme music composer: Juan Gabriel
- Opening theme: "Yo te recuerdo" by Juan Gabriel
- Country of origin: Mexico
- Original language: Spanish
- No. of episodes: 135

Production
- Executive producer: Salvador Mejía Alejandre
- Producer: Nathalie Lartilleux
- Production locations: Filming; Televisa San Ángel; Mexico City, Mexico; Locations; Veracruz, Mexico; Tabasco, Mexico; Guerrero, Mexico; San Andrés, San Miguel de Allende, Mexico; Catemaco, Mexico
- Cinematography: Manuel Barajas
- Editors: Marco Antonio Rocha; Pablo Peralta
- Camera setup: Multi-camera
- Running time: 41-44 minutes
- Production company: Televisa

Original release
- Network: Canal de las Estrellas
- Release: October 20, 2003 – April 23, 2004

Related
- Mariana de la noche (1975-1976); Selva María (1987)

Mariana de la noche (Lit. title: Mariana of the Night, English title: Dark Fate) is a Mexican telenovela produced by Salvador Mejía Alejandre for Televisa in 2003.

On Monday, October 20, 2003, Canal de las Estrellas started broadcasting Mariana de la noche weekdays at 9:00pm, replacing Amor real. The last episode was broadcast on Friday, April 23, 2004 with Mujer de madera replacing it on Monday, April 26, 2004.

The series stars Angélica Rivera, Jorge Salinas, Alejandra Barros, César Évora, Patricia Navidad, Adriana Fonseca, René Strickler and Alma Muriel.

== Plot ==
In this small mining town, rumor has it that Mariana Montenegro (Alejandra Barros) is under a curse, since all the men who fall in love with her sooner or later suffer a fatal accident. Mariana is a romantic and dreamy young woman who lives with her father, Atilio (César Évora), and is a maternal orphan. Atilio is the owner of the mine; a powerful man with a strong character who becomes cruel when someone opposes his will and who keeps a secret that eats away at his soul: Mariana is not his daughter and what he feels for her is far from being paternal affection.

Atilio has two sisters; Isabel (Alma Muriel), the eldest, is a good and affectionate woman who has raised Mariana and loves her as if she were her own daughter. Marcia (Angélica Rivera), the youngest, is arrogant and vain, harsh with the miners and with a cold heart that has never known love, until in town appears Ignacio Lugo (Jorge Salinas), a young and attractive journalist who has arrived at the place under a false name, in search of his roots.

Upon meeting Mariana, Ignacio knows that he will never be able to love another woman and Mariana also gives herself to him in body and soul. But Marcia falls passionately in love with Ignacio and is consumed by jealousy when she discovers that he and Mariana have secretly married. Furious and spiteful, Marcia informs her brother of the marriage and Atilio is determined to have Ignacio killed, without knowing that the man he is sentencing to death is his own son, the product of an affair with Lucrecia (María Rojo), the owner of the town’s restaurant.

However, fate saves Ignacio's life when an accident occurs in the mine and Atilio is seriously injured. Mariana finds out that Atilio is not her father and is horrified to learn that he is in love with her. Desperate and believing that she is actually cursed, Mariana flees the town carrying Ignacio's child in her womb. Marcia takes advantage of the situation to marry a man she does not love and become pregnant, but after a miscarriage, she manages to seduce Ignacio and steal Mariana's son, whom she passes off as her own to force Ignacio to marry her.

Set in a small mining town, Mariana is a woman portrayed as the centre of local rumours and legends. Believing she is under a curse, she wears black as her life becomes entangled in the town's conflicts and superstitions.

== Cast ==
=== Main ===
- Angélica Rivera as Marcia
- Jorge Salinas as Ignacio
- Alejandra Barros as Mariana
- César Évora as Atilio
- Patricia Navidad as Yadira
- Adriana Fonseca as Chachi
- René Strickler as Camilo
- Alma Muriel as Isabel

=== Also main ===
- María Rojo as Lucrecia
- José Carlos Ruiz as Isidro
- Patricia Reyes Spíndola as María Lola
- Raúl Ramírez as Father Pedro

=== Recurring and guest stars ===
- Sergio Acosta as Cumache
- Carlos Amador as Sergio
- Agustín Arana as Oropo
- Juan Ignacio Aranda as Dr. Lozano
- Esther Barroso as Cándida
- Socorro Bonilla as Nelli
- Aurora Clavel as Mamá Lupe
- Verónika con K as Ruth
- Daniel Continente as Juan Pablo
- Miguel de León as José Ramón
- Marjorie de Sousa as Carol
- Salvador Garcini as Lauro
- Ignacio Guadalupe as Mediomundo
- Benjamín Islas as Liborio
- Valentino Lanús as Javier
- Jaime Lozano as Eladio
- Sandra Montoya as Itzel
- Arturo Muñoz as Max
- Aleida Núñez as Miguelina
- Manuel Raviela as Benito
- Esperanza Rendón as Vilma
- Rafael Rojas as Gerardo
- Patricia Romero as Doris
- Gabriel Roustand as Zamora
- Roberto Ruy as Miztli
- Alberto Salaberry as Manuel
- Ricardo Vera as Commander
- Liza Willert as Juanita
- Roberto Blandón as Iván

== Awards and nominations ==
Year	Award	Category	Nominee(s)	Result
2004	TVyNovelas Awards	Best Telenovela	Salvador Mejía Alejandre	Nominated
2004	TVyNovelas Awards	Best Actor	Jorge Salinas	Nominated
2004	TVyNovelas Awards	Best Antagonist Actress	Angélica Rivera	Won
2004	TVyNovelas Awards	Best Antagonist Actor	César Évora	Won
2004	TVyNovelas Awards	Best Leading Actress	Patricia Reyes Spíndola	Nominated
2004	TVyNovelas Awards	Best Leading Actor	José Carlos Ruiz	Nominated
2004	TVyNovelas Awards	Best Co-lead Actress	Adriana Fonseca	Nominated
