= Mister International 2026 =

18th edition of Mister International (Thailand)

- Date: 26 September 2026
- Presenters: Luke Ishikawa Plowden; William Badell; Rubishka Shrestha; Anusith Sangnimnuan
- Venue: MCC Hall Bangkapi, Bangkok, Thailand
- Entrants: 52
- Placements: 20
- Debuts: Cape Verde; Iraq; Republic of the Congo; Somalia; Tajikistan
- Withdrawals: Costa Rica; Democratic Republic of the Congo; Dominican Republic; Ecuador; El Salvador; Guinea-Bissau; Italy; Kenya; Mali; Paraguay; Tunisia
- Returns: Azerbaijan; Bolivia; Cameroon; China; Cuba; Honduras; Hong Kong; Macau; Malaysia; Netherlands; North Macedonia; Portugal; Sierra Leone; Singapore; United States
- Winner: Andrés Briseño; Mexico
- Congeniality: Justin Khoa Phạm, United States
- Best National Costume: Gede Aiswarya Kartika, Indonesia
- Photogenic: Ravindu Wijesooriya, Sri Lanka

Mister International 2026 was the 18th Mister International pageant, held at the MCC Hall Bangkapi in Bangkok, Thailand, on 26 September 2026.

Kirk Bondad of the Philippines crowned Andrés Briseño of Mexico as his successor at the end of the event, marking the country's first title in the pageant's history.

== Results ==
=== Placements ===
Placement	Contestant
Mister International 2026	Mexico – Andrés Briseño
1st Runner-Up	Spain – Ignacio Monclús
2nd Runner-Up	Indonesia – Gede Aiswarya Kartika
3rd Runner-Up	Turkey – Doğukan Navdar
4th Runner-Up	Vietnam – Nguyễn Vũ Linh
5th Runner-Up	Sri Lanka – Ravindu Wijesooriya α γ
Top 10	Nigeria – Abure Ebosetale ε; Philippines – John Wayne Alba; South Korea – Jung Gyu Park; Thailand – Waranyu Tharasiriwattanakul
Top 20	Australia – Dylan Mahoney; Canada – Maverick Service; Iraq – Mustafa Bayati δ; Netherlands – Yannick Tavernier; Northern Cyprus – Adnan Aksoy; Panama – Jesus Perez; Puerto Rico – Jomar Rosa; South Africa – Malwanduthando Khumalo; United States – Justin Khoa Phạm β; Venezuela – Kenneth Bellorín

Notes:
α – Placed into the Top 6 through the Mister People's Choice Award
β – Placed into the Top 20 through the Mister Influencer Award
γ – Placed into the Top 20 through the Mister Photogenic Award
δ – Placed into the Top 20 through the Mister Digital Media Excellence Award
ε – Placed into the Top 20 through the Mister Social Impact Award

==== Continental Winners ====
Continent	Contestant
Africa	Nigeria – Abure Ebosetale
Americas	Puerto Rico – Jomar Rosa
Asia	Indonesia – Gede Aiswarya Kartika
Europe	Spain – Ignacio Monclús

==== Special awards ====
Award	Contestant
Best in Swimwear	Nigeria – Abure Ebosetale
Best National Costume	Indonesia – Gede Aiswarya Kartika
Mister Digital Media Excellence	Iraq – Mustafa Bayati
Mister Congeniality	United States – Justin Khoa Phạm
Mister Influencer	United States – Justin Khoa Phạm
Mister People's Choice	Sri Lanka – Ravindu Wijesooriya
Mister Photogenic	Sri Lanka – Ravindu Wijesooriya
Mister Social Impact Award	Nigeria – Abure Ebosetale
Mister Telegenic	Turkey – Doğukan Navdar

== Contestants ==
52 contestants competed for the title;

Country/Territory	Contestant	Age	Hometown	Ref.
Australia	Dylan Mahoney	34	Townsville	
Azerbaijan	Aghayar Hasanov	31	Baku	
Bolivia	Paulo Justiniano	20	Étoy	
Brazil	Eduardo Castillo	28	Manaus	
Cameroon	Dany Mbella	28	Kribi	
Canada	Maverick Service	20	Burlington	
Cape Verde	Kelton Garcia	28	Praia	
China	Yi-Kang Huang	21	Guangzhou	
Colombia	Alexander Herrera	37	Santander	
Cuba	Dalvin Fonseca	31	Camagüey	
Czech Republic	Michal Šedivý	21	Liberec	
Egypt	Ahmed Wahid Mohamed	29	Alexandria	
France	Médy Marie	30	Nice	
Ghana	Kevin Macaiah	25	Achimota	
Honduras	Noé Carlos Gonzales	27	Tela	
Hong Kong	Jason Leong	32	Hong Kong	
India	Aaryan Chawla	28	Daman	
Indonesia	Gede Aiswarya Kartika	23	Bali	
Iraq	Mustafa Bayati	25	Baghdad	
Ivory Coast	Touré Migadji Hermann	25	Katiola	
Japan	Taisei Ezaki	27	Fukuoka	
Laos	Anouza Sihalard	20	Ban Tanpiao	
Lebanon	Omar Beyrouthy	22	Baalbek	
Macau	Yu Hang	24	Macau	
Malaysia	Mohamad Hafizzi	31	Johor Bahru	
Mexico	Andrés Briseño	21	Mazatlán	
Myanmar	Yu Gan	23	Pathein	
Nepal	Siddhant Khatri Chhetri	21	Tulsipur	
Netherlands	Yannick Tavernier	20	Katwijk	
Nicaragua	Luciano López	29	Managua	
Nigeria	Abure Ebosetale	22	Edo State	
North Macedonia	Oktaj Sejdi	29	Skopje	
Northern Cyprus	Adnan Aksoy	22	Lefkoşa	
Panama	Jesús Pérez	39	Santiago de Veraguas	
Philippines	John Wayne Alba	22	Calamba	
Portugal	Kevin Pereira	19	Tagilde	
Puerto Rico	Jomar Rosa	21	Adjuntas	
Republic of the Congo	Ludovic Lumengo	33	Kinshasa	
Sierra Leone	Richter Yaw Gator	23	Freetown	
Singapore	Joyner Canlas Samson	41	Thomson	
Somalia	Ilyas Abukar	30	Estavayer-le-Lac	
South Africa	Malwanduthando Khumalo	20	Vryheid	
South Korea	Jung Gyu Park	28	Cheongju	
Sri Lanka	Ravindu Wijesooriya	26	Wattala	
Spain	Ignacio Monclus	26	Jaca	
Switzerland	Mathieu Agresta	33	Neuchâtel	
Tajikistan	Firdavsjon Ehsonov	25	Khujand	
Thailand	Waranyu Tharasiriwattanakul	32	Bangkok	
Turkey	Doğukan Navdar	22	Ardeşen	
United States	Justin Khoa Phạm	29	Fort Myers	
Venezuela	Kenneth Bellorín	26	Porlamar	
Vietnam	Nguyễn Vũ Linh	32	Bến Tre	
