= Mariana de la noche (Venezuelan TV series) =

- Genre: Telenovela
- Created by: Delia Fiallo
- Directed by: Grazzio D'Angelo
- Starring: Lupita Ferrer; José Bardina; Martín Lantigua; Ivonne Attas
- Opening theme: "Emmanuelle" by Fausto Papetti
- Country of origin: Venezuela
- Original language: Spanish

Production
- Executive producer: Tabaré Perez
- Production locations: Táchira; Caracas
- Production company: Venevisión

Original release
- Network: Venevisión
- Release: 1976 – 1976

Mariana de la noche is a Venezuelan telenovela produced in 1976 by Venevisión. An original story written by Cuban-born writer Delia Fiallo, it starred Lupita Ferrer and José Bardina as the main protagonists plus Martín Lantigua and Ivonne Attas as the main antagonists.

== Plot ==
In a mining town south of Venezuela lives Mariana Montenegro, a young, romantic woman who is rumored to be cursed, as all the men who fall in love with her end up suffering in a fatal accident. Mariana is motherless, but lives with her father Atilio Montenegro, a wealthy landowner who owns several mines where he has enslaved the employees by making them work hard while paying them little. Atilio is very tough and cruel to anyone opposes his will. Atilio is also a very stern father with Mariana, as she has become his favorite, causing suspicion and envy in his other daughter Chachi. However, Atilio hides a secret: Mariana isn't his daughter, and what he feels for her is far from paternal affection.

Atilio has two sisters. Isabel, the eldest, is a kind and loving woman who raised Mariana and loves her as her own daughter. Marcia, the youngest, is arrogant and vain, and she works at the mines where she is hard and cold-hearted to the miners. Atilio keeps the people terrified through using his goons. But this continues until Ignacio Lugo comes to town, a young and attractive journalist who introduces himself under a false name in order to search for his origins. He calls himself Nacho Luna and is looking for work in the mine, arousing intrigue with all the townspeople.

Nacho gets a job in the mines and one night when he goes for a walk, he meets Mariana in the fields where an instant attraction develops between them. Ignacio knows he can never love another woman other than Mariana. But what Mariana doesn't know is that her Aunt Marcia, who has never known love, has also fallen passionately in love with Ignacio. She is consumed with jealousy when she discovers that Ignacio and Mariana are lovers. Angry and resentful, Macaria tells his brother about the relationship making Atilio inquire about the origin of Nacho, and he finally discovers that Ignacio Lugo Navarro is his son, the product of an affair with Lucrecia, the owner of the restaurant in town. Atilio is determined to kill Ignacio. However, the fate saves the life of Ignacio when an accident occurs at the mine and Atilio is wounded. Mariana learns that Atilio isn't her real father and is horrified to learn that he loves her. Desperate and believing that she is in danger, Mariana flees the village, pregnant with Ignacio's child. Marcia advantage of the situation to marry a man she does not love and she becomes pregnant, but after an abortion, she manages to seduce and steal Ignacio and Mariana's son, and passes him as her own in order to force Ignacio to marry her.

Mariana's story is a complex plot of secrets that dominate the life of a small mining town full of characters, superstitions, rumors and legends. As the legend of the beautiful woman who always wears black because she weighs about a terrible curse: Mariana de la noche.

== Cast ==
- Lupita Ferrer as Mariana Montenegro
- José Bardina as Ignacio Lugo Navarro
- Martín Lantigua as Atilio Montenegro
- Ivonne Attas as Marcia Montenegro
- Eva Blanco
- Ana Castell
- José Olivia
- Daniel Lugo
- Alejandra Pinedo
- María Antonieta Campoli
- Caridad Canelón
- Jorge Félix
- Arturo Puig

== Versions ==
- Selva María: Produced in Venezuela in 1988 by RCTV starring Mariela Alcalá and Franklin Virgüez as the main protagonists with Guillermo Ferran and Hilda Abrahamz as the main antagonists.
- Mariana de la Noche: Produced in Mexico by Televisa in 2003 starring Alejandra Barros and Jorge Salinas.
