= Nathalie Lartilleux =

French television producer

- Born: France
- Occupation: Television producer
- Writing career
- Notable works: Cuidado con el ángel; Inocente de ti; Corazon Indomable; Mar de amor; Un camino hacia el destino

Nathalie Lartilleux is a French television producer, who is an executive producer at Televisa. She is best known for her telenovela, Cuidado con el ángel.

== Career ==
Lartilleux began her career by being an associate producer of the telenovelas produced by her husband, Salvador Mejía. Among their productions are Esmeralda, Rosalinda, and La usurpadora. She debuted as an outright producer in 2004 with the telenovela Inocente de Ti, starring Camila Sodi, Valentino Lanus, and Helena Rojo. Later, in 2005, she produced Peregrina, which turned out to be an unexpected success, starring África Zavala and Eduardo Capetillo. In 2008, her career took off when she produced the internationally successful Cuidado con el Ángel, starring Maite Perroni and William Levy.

== Filmography ==
=== Television ===
Year	Title	Starring	Role
1997	Esmeralda	Leticia Calderón and Fernando Colunga	Associate producer
1998	La usurpadora	Gabriela Spanic and Fernando Colunga	Associate producer
1999	Rosalinda	Thalía and Fernando Carillo	Associate producer
2000–2001	Abrázame muy fuerte	Aracely Arámbula and Fernando Colunga	Associate producer
2002	Entre el amor y el odio	Susana González and César Évora	Associate producer
2003–2004	Mariana de la noche	Alejandra Barros and Jorge Salinas	Associate producer
2004–2005	Inocente de ti	Camila Sodi and Valentino Lanus	Executive producer
2005–2006	Peregrina	África Zavala and Eduardo Capetillo	Executive producer
2008–2009	Cuidado con el ángel	Maite Perroni and William Levy	Executive producer
2009–2010	Mar de amor	Zuria Vega and Mario Cimarro	Executive producer
2011	Rafaela	Scarlet Ortiz and Jorge Poza	Executive producer
2013	Corazón indomable	Ana Brenda Contreras and Daniel Arenas	Executive producer
2014	La Gata	Maite Perroni and Daniel Arenas	Executive producer
2016	Un camino hacia el destino	Paulina Goto and Horacio Pancheri	Executive producer
2017	El vuelo de la Victoria	Paulina Goto and Mané de la Parra	Executive producer
