= Gay characters in telenovelas =

Telenovelas are famous for their love stories, drama, and characters. These TV series tend to revolve around heterosexual couples, however as of late, gay male characters have been more incorporated into telenovelas plot lines. With changing times, queer and gay characters have become more reoccurring in telenovelas. The biggest evolution of gay characters in telenovelas come from the fact that they have switched from just being placed in the background or being subjected to a sidekick role and transitioned into main protagonists with serious storylines.

One of the first appearances of a gay character in a telenovela was in 1999, in the series La Vida en El Espejo, in which the character develops a queer relationship. In 2013, the Mexican telenovela Amores verdaderos featured the first gay wedding in telenovela history. In 2019, the Mexican telenovela El corazón nunca se equivoca became the first to center a gay love story.

== History ==
=== 1990s ===
In the 1990s, there was a change in how telenovelas were produced and created due to the switch from state-owned to private television networks and the creation of cable television and later streaming platforms. This switch allowed for more nuanced and complex issues and stories.

However, there is very little representation of gay male characters in the 1990s. Despite this, there were what many fans call gay "coded" characters. One of the first representations of gay "coded" characters, was in the telenovela Volver a empezar in 1994. Many of the fans felt that the character Paul, played by Radamés de Jesús, was one of the first of many gay “coded” characters in the 1990s. The most notable telenovela from this time period is La Vida en El Espejo.

=== 2000s ===
During this time, there was a much more dramatic energy surrounding gay characters and their arcs. Their storylines often had very intense premises that had their sexuality being a source of conflict or scandal.

In the 2000s, telenovelas had more gay characters that represented stereotypes of gay men within media. Additionally, this time period also created a change in representation in telenovelas. In 2007, the telenovela Yo amo a Juan Querendón designed a gay character who stepped out of the stereotypes. In the telenovela, Gaytán is a wealthy, masculine, man who is open about his homosexuality.

=== 2010s to present ===
Modernization has changed the way media represents the world. Telenovelas have shifted from the 2000s to modern times. New additions of queer characters have become more apparent in order to appeal to more younger audiences. This era had a plethora of big achievements when to comes to gay characters in Telenovelas, ranging from things like lesbian couples and the first show centered around a gay couple.

In 2010, the Mexican telenovela Las Aparicio had the very first on-screen lesbian kiss in the history of telenovelas, between Julia Aparicio and Mariana Almada, played by Liz Gallardo and Eréndira Ibarra respectively.

In 2013, the Telemundo show El Senor de los Cielos featured a same-sex kiss with a dramatized version of a Mexican president. This was very revolutionary because it involved a very traditionally ‘’masculine man’’ and it challenged stereotypes surrounding masculinity.

In 2017, the Chilean period drama telenovela Perdona Nuestros Pecados featured a revolutionary storyline set in the 1950s with a romance between two female characters, Bárbara and Mechita, played by Maria Jose Bello and Soledad Cruz.

In 2018, the Mexican paranormal telenovela, Amar A Muerte introduced two characters named Valentina and Juliana played by Macarena Achaga and Barbara Lopez who were involved in a lesbian relationship that gained a large following on social media.

Also in 2018, in the second season of the popular Mexican telenovela Mi Marido Tiene Mas Familia the teenage couple of Aristóteles and Cuauhtémoc is introduced, and they gained such a big following that they were given their own spinoff show, El Amor Nunca Se Equivoca. In 2019, the spin off show El Amor Nunca Se Equivoca became the very first Mexican telenovela following a gay relationship as the main protagonists.

La Casa de las Flores (2018), has become one of the telenovelas to added their own telenovela spin. With characters Julian and Diego. The couple have a secret relationship for five years which is later in the series is revealed when Julian comes out as bisexual. When this character comes out as bisexual, it is treated seriously rather than being hidden away or dismissed as him just being gay. The show also shows the experiences of a transgender woman such as family rejection, migration, and acceptance with the character María José Riquelme.

== Character design ==
Depictions of gay men within telenovelas has always centered on certain stereotypes or tropes. Often they are depicted as effeminate men or girly men and the hairdresser. All of these tropes represent a caricature within telenovelas. Many of these characters are also “sidekick” and or play the villain to the protagonist. Being either the empathic best friend or mean villainous character. Telenovelas from earlier times use these tropes in order to create their gay characters.

In recent times, with the rise of millennial telenovelas there is also more push and representation of queer characters within telenovelas that don't revolve around the typical tropes. Telenovelas have begun creating and developing better designs for their gay characters. Beginning with the 2007 telenovela Yo amo a Juan Querendón where the gay character within the series is created more deeply and complex. A telenovela that portrays these recent ideals, Mi Marido Tiene Más Familia (2017). Two of the characters in the series develop a slow burn relationship.

== Influence of Mexican culture in media ==
Mexico is known for its traditional values in Catholicism and machismo. Machismo values and concepts have connected femininity with homosexuality and masculinity with heterosexuality. Additionally, Catholicism used to keep this construct within Mexican society and culture. These values are especially represented within telenovelas. Due to this homosexuality has become taboo in Mexican culture. The dialog and characters in telenovelas become a reflection of societal ideals within the media. A study from Public Religion Research Institute suggests that 53% of Hispanics get their knowledge of the world through telenovelas. Telenovelas is the place which many Latinos get their understanding of gender identity and sexuality.

== Public opinion ==
The visibility and representation of gay storylines and characters have been both a positive and negative outcome. The more visibility of male gay characters within telenovelas, tolerance and acceptance is more visible within Mexican society and culture. Recent telenovelas have been shifting the ideals of masculinity and representing masculinity in different ways.

One of the biggest things that have changed when it comes to the public opinion surrounding gay characters in telenovelas is that the audiences and fans have a much larger impact on storylines. They are using their social media platforms to campaign for the couples they have grown to love. They demand visibility and fight for more inclusive arcs and stories for these characters. It’s not just producers and writers involved in the process.

Two occasions where you see the public rallying around a queer couple is in the 2014 Brazilian telenovela, Em Família with the characters of Clara Fernandes and Marina Meirelles played by Giovanna Antonelli and Tainá Müller. As well as, in the twenty-fifth season of the Brazilian telenovela Malhação: Viva a Diferença, with the characters Lica and Samantha played by Manoela Aliperti and Giovanna Grigio.

However, many of the telenovelas have received backlash for their representation of gay male characters. Much of the backlash comes from politicians who have made anti-LGBTQIA+ remarks and some from the public. Additionally, TV networks and streaming services wanting to appeal to younger audiences use gay and or queer characters as token devices. Creating storylines that mainly focus on tragic storylines which do not reflect the entire realities of gay males.

While public opinion has definitely improved with these characters, it is important to discuss that simply having these characters is not enough for the general public to connect to them. Studies show that if a character is written very surface level and the show is poking fun at all the stereotypes put in place around gay characters, it makes older, traditionally conservative generations think that their homophobic tendencies are normal and even encouraged. This study shows that the quality of these stories matters equally, if not more than just inclusion, having more gay characters does not automatically mean acceptance.
