= Emilio Osorio =

Mexican actor

- Osorio at the 2026 Latin Grammy Awards
- Born: Emilio Osorio Marcos
- Occupations: Actor; singer; dancer
- Years active: 2013–present
- Partner: Leslie Gallardo
- Parents: Juan Osorio (father); Niurka Marcos (mother)

Emilio Osorio Marcos is a Mexican actor and singer. He is the son of Mexican producer Juan Osorio and Cuban-Mexican singer and actress Niurka Marcos.

== Career ==
Osorio made his screen acting debut in 2013 in the telenovela, Porque el amor manda, where he also showed his talent in singing and dancing.

In 2014, he had his breakout role in the telenovela Mi corazón es tuyo where he portrayed Sebastián Lascurain, one of the seven children of Jorge Salinas' character. Osorio also took part in the musical theater of Mi corazón es tuyo.

In 2015, he had a role in the series Como dice el dicho playing Ramón in the episode "No juzgues a tus semejantes".

Osorio joined the cast for Sueño de amor. The series aired from February 22 to August 21, 2016.

In 2017–2019 he participated in the telenovela Mi marido tiene familia alongside Daniel Arenas, Zuria Vega, and Silvia Pinal.

After the broadcast of the telenovela, Osorio returned to interpret his character Aristoteles with Joaquin Bondoni with his character Temo having main roles in the musical "Aristemo: El musical" and also (with Bondoni) in the telenovela "Juntos, el corazón nunca se equivoca", in which both sing the main theme of the telenovela.

On May 17, 2019, Emilio's self-titled debut album is released, including songs he performed for the telenovela such as Labios de Miel, Amor Valiente (song he performs with Bondoni), Juegos de Amor, and also includes a solo song by Bondoni. .

In one of the last performances of the musical, it is announced that Emilio would be giving a series of concerts at the Plaza Condesa as a way to promote his debut album, which would later become his debut tour "PerfecTOUR" adding more dates around Mexico, even arriving to be in Peru and Brazil.

It was announced that Emilio would be singing "La Playita", main theme of the telenovela "Soltero con hijas" (also produced by his father), this theme being the first song written by Emilio, which was also included in the repackage of his debut album in which includes several songs in Portuguese.

On April 17, 2020, he releases the single "Danzón", and it is also announced that Emilio is already working on his next album.

On June 26, he officially released the single "Hoy Me Tengo Que Ir", which he performed as part of the setlist on his tour.

And now in 2021, he participated in the telenovela "Que le pasa a mi familia?" as Lalo Rueda.

== Filmography ==
Television
| Year | Title | Role | Notes |
|---|---|---|---|
| 2013 | Porque el amor manda | Quico Cárdenas | Recurring role; 23 episodes |
| 2014–2015 | Mi corazón es tuyo | Sebastián Lascurain | Main cast; 176 episodes |
| 2015 | Como dice el dicho | Ramón | "No juzgues a tus semejantes" (Season 5, Episode 30) |
| 2016 | Sueño de amor | Kiko Gallo | Main cast |
| 2017–2019 | Mi marido tiene familia | Aristóteles Córcega | |
| 2019 | El corazón nunca se equivoca | Aristóteles Córcega | Main Cast |
| 2019 | Alma de ángel | Aristóteles Córcega | Episode: "Esmeralda (La medium)" |
| 2020 | Soltero con hijas | Himself | Guest role |
| 2021 | ¿Qué le pasa a mi familia? | Lalo Rueda Torres | |
| 2023 | La casa de los famosos México | Himself | Houseguest |
| 2025 | Amanecer | Tonatiuh Talavera | Main cast |
| 2026 | Tierra de amor y coraje | Lalo | Lead role |

== Discography ==
=== Albums ===
- Emilio (2019)

=== Singles ===
==== 2019 ====
- "Es Por Ti" (featuring. Joaquín Bondoni)
- "Amor Valiente" (featuring. Joaquín Bondoni)
- "La playita"

==== 2020 ====
- Danzón
- Hoy Me Tengo Que Ir
- Coro de Amor (featuring. Karol Sevilla)

==== 2021 ====
- "Es una locura"(featuring. Mané de la Parra)

== Theatre ==
| Year | Title | Role |
|---|---|---|
| 2015 | Mi corazón es tuyo | Sebastián Lascurain |
| 2019 | Aristemo el musical | Aristóteles Córcega |

== Awards and nominations ==
| Year | Award | Category | Nominated works | Result | Ref. |
|---|---|---|---|---|---|
| 2015 | Kids Choice Awards México | Favorite Revelation | Mi corazón es tuyo | Nominated | |
| 2018 | TV Adicto Golden Awards | Male revelation | Mi marido tiene más familia | Won | |
| 2019 | Premios TVyNovelas | Best Young Lead Actor | Mi marido tiene más familia | Nominated | |
| 2019 | Premios Eres | Best Actor | Mi marido tiene más familia | Won | |
| 2019 | Premios Eres | Best Kiss | Mi marido tiene más familia | Won | |
| 2019 | E! Online TV's Top Couple | TV's Top Couple | Mi marido tiene más familia | Won | |
| 2019 | MTV Millennial Awards | Couple on fire | Mi marido tiene más familia | Nominated | |
| 2019 | E! Online TV Scoop Awards | Best performance | El corazón nunca se equivoca | Won | |
| 2019 | Kids Choice Awards México | Favorite actor | Mi marido tiene más familia | Won | |
| 2019 | Kids Choice Awards México | Favorite ship | Mi marido tiene más familia | Won | |
