= Joaquín Bondoni =

Mexican singer and actor

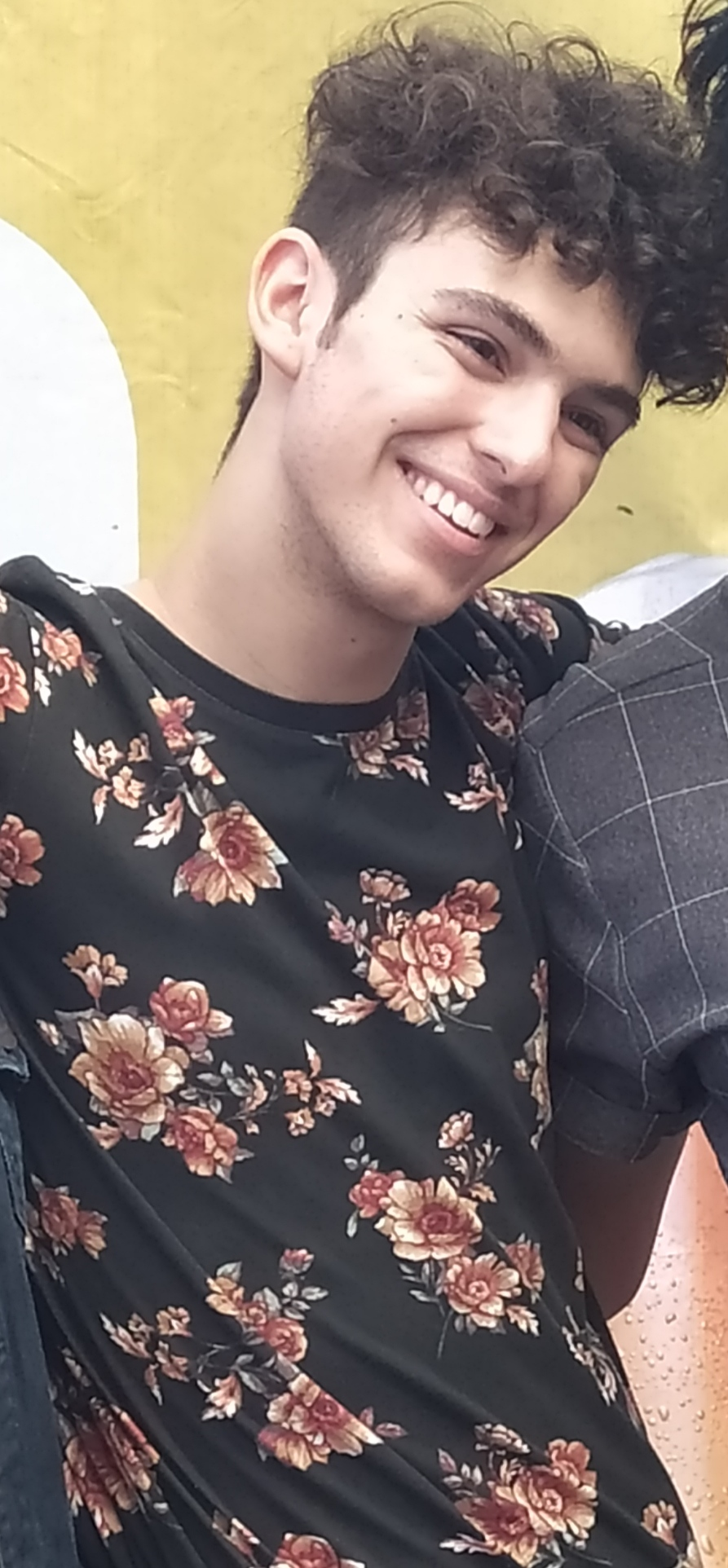
- Bondoni in 2020
- Born: Joaquín Bondoni Gress; May 8, 2003 (age 23); Mexico City, Mexico
- Occupation: Singer • Songwriter • Actor
- Years active: 2010–present

Joaquín Bondoni Gress (born May 8, 2003) is a Mexican singer, songwriter and actor, known for his role in the Mexican telenovela Mi marido tiene más familia and El corazón nunca se equivoca as Cuauhtémoc "Temo" López, and for being a member of the Mexican group Tres 8 Uno.

== Career ==
=== 2010 – 2019 ===
Bondoni began his acting studies at the Centro de Educación Artística in Mexico City. In 2010, He debuted as an actor in the television series La rosa de Guadalupe, Como dice el dicho, the telenovela Ni contigo ni sin ti and La piloto.

He was part of the pop music group, called Tres 8 Uno when it was active in early 2018–2019. In this pop music group, there are Ana Paola Marín, Loretta Goyri, Nicole Reyes, Esly Tellez, Melissa Dominique, Emanuel Lattanzio and Mauro Aldair.

In 2018 he joined the telenovela Mi marido tiene más familia produced by Juan Osorio, playing "Cuauhtémoc 'Temo' López", son of "Francisco 'Pancho' López" from the 2010 telenovela Una familia con suerte, and became known for his role as a gay teenager, who falls in love with "Aristóteles Córcega" (Emilio Osorio), grandson of "Doña Imelda" (Silvia Pinal) and cousin of the protagonist "Robert Cooper / Juan Pablo" (Daniel Arenas). After Mi marido tiene más familia he played the same character in theater in Aristemo: el musical.

In 2019, Bondoni reprised the role in the spin-off series El corazón nunca se equivoca, now starring in the lead role. In this series, there are also Nikolas Caballero, Ale Müller, Eduardo Barquín, Gabriela Platas, Arath de la Torre and the Cuban actor, musician and singer Emilio Osorio Marcos de Sevilla.

In September of the same year, for the telenovela Alma de ángel, Joaquín and his partner Emilio Osorio, had a small appearance and repeating their roles as Cuauhtémoc "Temo" Lopez and Aristóteles Córcega Castañeda. That same year, he and Emilio recorded and released three new songs on digital platforms and appeared as a guest in the latter's tour.

=== 2020 – present ===
On June 15, 2020, Joaquín has a small appearance in the music video for the song "Love (Es Nuestro Idioma)" by the Mexican pop music duo, Jesse & Joy. In this video clip it also has great appearances by various artists such as Sofía Reyes, Alejandro Sanz, Los Polinesios, Eugenio Derbez, Ana Bárbara, Juanpa Zurita, Vadhir Derbez, Juanes, Eric Nam, Luis Fonsi and among others artists.

For the play "Distorsión", confirm Joaquín as Federico, a teenager with a mental disorder, who over time developed two personalities. For this work, the film and television actor, Mauricio Islas, is also confirmed, who will play Rafael, a psychology teacher and Federico's uncle. The play will be directed by director Enrique Medina and by producer Alejandro Medina, who died on February 27 of this year. For the play, Joaquín recorded a song that will be the main theme, entitled "Blanco y Negro".

During an interview for the show program "Ventaneando", Joaquín commented on the situation he has for a song that is included in the work and that a producer is marketing without his authorization, where his mother, Elizabeth Gress, who serves as the singer's manager He shared that a legal process has already begun against the music producer who wants to commercialize, without his authorization, the song that his son performs. Despite being very disappointed in the way many people in the entertainment industry act, he asked his fans to be careful around the people around them.

Joaquín revealed through his Twitter and Instagram accounts, several previews of his next single that would be titled "Black". On October 1, Joaquín releases his song "Black", being his first solo single, where he presents themes and melodies reminiscent of eighties or disco music. In just a few hours, "Black" managed to be number 1 on iTunes in Mexico and fourth in Spain. On October 9, the official video for the song is released.

== Filmography ==
Television
Year	Title	Role	Notes
2010–2018	La rosa de Guadalupe	Various roles	9 episodes
2011	Ni contigo ni sin ti	Pedrito	Episodes: "La revelación"; "Terrible incendio"
2017	La piloto	Jerry	Episode: "Un secreto"
2018	Como dice el dicho	Jaime	Episode: "El buen morir es el premio al buen vivir"
2018–2019	Tres 8 Uno: The Family	Himself	25 episodes
2018–2019	Mi marido tiene más familia	Cuauhtémoc "Temo" López	Main Cast
2019	Tour Un Millón De Sueños	Himself	Concert Movie
2019	El corazón nunca se equivoca	Cuauhtémoc "Temo" López	Main cast
2019	Alma de ángel	Cuauhtémoc "Temo" López	Episode: Esmeralda (La medium)

== Theatre ==
Year	Title	Role
2016	Una tarde cualquiera	Armandito
2018	Tour Un Millón De Sueños	Tres 8 Uno's group member
2019	Aristemo el musical	Cuauhtémoc "Temo" López
2020	Distorsión	Francisco and Federico

== Discography ==
=== Singles ===
2019:

- "Si Me Dices Que Me Quieres"

2020:

- "Blanco y Negro"
- "Black"

2021:

- "Distorsión"
- "Pose"

2022:

- "Dragón"
- "Galactica"

=== Collaborations ===
2019:

- "Es Por Ti" (featuring. Emilio Osorio)
- "Amor Valiente" (featuring. Emilio Osorio)

== Awards and nominations ==
Year	Award	Category	Nominated work	Result	Ref.
2019	Premios ERES	Best actor	Mi marido tiene más familia	Nominated	
2019	Premios ERES	Best kiss	Mi marido tiene más familia	Won	
2019	TV Adicto Golden Awards	Male revelation	Mi marido tiene más familia	Won	
2019	E! Online TV's Top Couple	TV's Top Couple	Mi marido tiene más familia	Won	
2019	MTV Millennial Awards	Couple on fire	Mi marido tiene más familia	Nominated	
2019	E! Online TV Scoop Awards	Best breakout star	El corazón nunca se equivoca	Won	
2019	Kids Choice Awards México	Revelation Artist	Mi marido tiene más familia	Won	
2019	Kids Choice Awards México	Favorite ship	Mi marido tiene más familia	Won	
2020	Kids Choice Awards México	Favorite Actor	Mi marido tiene más familia	Won	

== See also ==
- Mexican people of Italian descent
