= Volando bajo =

- Film poster
- Directed by: Beto Gómez
- Written by: Francisco Payó González; Beto Gómez
- Produced by: Laura Arvizu; Santiago Garcia Galvan; Carlos Valle Novelo; Gustavo Angel Olaya; Nora Parra; Raúl Ramón; Georgina Terán; Walter Von Borstel
- Starring: Gerardo Taracena; Ludwika Paleta; Sandra Echeverría; Ana Brenda Contreras; Rodrigo Oviedo; Rafael Inclán; Randy Vasquez
- Cinematography: Daniel Jacobs
- Music by: Pascual Reyes
- Release dates: June 26, 2014 (Mexico); November 13, 2014 (United States)
- Running time: 90 minutes
- Countries: Mexico; United States; France
- Language: Spanish

Volando bajo (English: Flying Low) is a 2014 internationally co-produced musical comedy-drama film directed by Beto Gómez.

== Plot ==
Chuyin Venegas and Cornelio Barraza were the greatest stars of popular music and cinema in the 80's and 90's. After decades of success as "Los Jilgueros de Rosarito", they went their separate ways; but their story was far from over.

== Cast ==
- Gerardo Taracena as Chuyin Venegas
- Ludwika Paleta as Toribia Venegas
- Sandra Echeverría as Sara Medrano
- Ana Brenda Contreras as Mariana Arredondo
- Rodrigo Oviedo as Cornelio Barraza
- Rafael Inclán as Lucho Venegas Reyes
- Randy Vasquez as Lorenzo Scarfioti
- Livia Brito as Ana Bertha Miranda
- María Elisa Camargo as Natalie Johnson
- Isabella Camil as Ingrid Larsson
- Altair Jarabo as Abigail Restrepo-Mares
- Ingrid Martz as Eva Inés Casanova
- Javier López as Bruno Sánchez Félix
- Dan Rovzar as Gaston Silvestre
- Malillany Marín as Estrellita Martinez
- Nora Parra as Sor Maria
- Johanna Murillo as Debbie Parker
- Amanda Rosa as Wanda Dos Santos
- Roberto Espejo as Lissandro Beltrani
- Wendy Braga as Yolanda Del Mar
- Pascual Reyes
- Felipe Garcia Naranjo as Tony
- Genia Santini as TV show host
- Lorenza Aldrete as Muñeca Perez Robles
- Héctor Gutiérrez as Cornelio Niño
- Brian Hatch as Priest
- Jacinto Marina as Fefugio Miranda
