= Wild at Heart (Mexican TV series) =

Mexican telenovela

- Also known as: Corazón indomable
- Created by: Inés Rodena
- Written by: Carlos Romero; Tere Medina; Julio Garibay
- Directed by: Víctor Fouilloux; Victor Rodriguez
- Starring: Ana Brenda Contreras; Daniel Arenas; Elizabeth Álvarez; César Évora
- Opening theme: "Déjalo ir" performed by Margarita Vargas
- Ending theme: "Perdóname" performed by Camilo Blanes
- Country of origin: Mexico
- Original language: Spanish
- No. of episodes: 161

Production
- Executive producer: Nathalie Lartilleux
- Producer: Leticia Díaz
- Cinematography: Jesús Acuña; Adrián Frutos
- Running time: 41-44 minutes
- Production company: Televisa

Original release
- Network: Canal de las Estrellas
- Release: February 25 – October 6, 2013

Related
- Corona de lágrimas; Por siempre mi amor; La indomable (1974); Marimar (1994); Marimar (2007); Marimar (2015)

Wild at Heart (Spanish title: Corazón indomable) is a Mexican telenovela produced by Nathalie Lartilleux for Televisa. It is a remake of the 1994 Mexican telenovela Marimar.

Ana Brenda Contreras and Daniel Arenas star as the protagonists, while Elizabeth Álvarez stars as the antagonist, with the special participation of César Évora.

As of January 30, 2017, Las Estrellas is broadcasting re-runs of Corazón indomable at 12:00pm replacing Mañana es para siempre and ended on June 30, 2017, with Lo que la vida me robó replacing it on July 3, 2017.

Univision started broadcasting Corazón indomable weeknights at 7pm/6c on May 13, 2013 replacing Corona de lágrimas. The last episode was broadcast at 8pm/7c on December 22, 2013 with Mentir para Vivir replacing it the next day

== Plot ==
Maricruz Olivares lives with Ramiro, her maternal grandfather, and Solita, who is deaf and who was found abandoned, by her mom Guadalupe Mendoza/Guadalupe Olivares and her grandfather when she was a little baby. She lives in a shack located in the middle of nature, near the Narvaéz's ranch property line. Miguel and Octavio are siblings and they both own the Narvaéz's ranch, which is mortgaged because of the bad administration Miguel, the older brother, has made. Octavio is a pilot and arrives in the ranch in need of money since he has lost his job and wants the lands to be sold. He doesn't imagine that soon he will forget this purpose and will discover that the earth, the sowing and sharing with the workmen become a source of passion for him.

Octavio meets Maricruz while he is traveling around the lands and catches his foreman trying to take her on. Regardless of her humble origins, he defends her as a gentleman. Immediately, he is trapped by her sympathy and beauty. When Octavio discovers the malice with which Lucia, his sister-in-law, treats Maricruz, he gets really angry and decides to marry Maricruz in order to teach his brother and Lucia a lesson. But Maricruz continues to get dissed and judged for her way of being, talking, acting and eating.

However, when he receives a tempting job offer as a pilot, Octavio leaves the ranch and asks his brother to give Maricruz his part of the land. Lucia and her cousin Esther set a trap for Maricruz to accuse her unjustly of being a thief and ends up in jail. A lawyer believes in her and achieves her freedom; but when she returns, she is shocked to discover that her grandfather died during a fire by Lucía's order done by Eusebio.

Maricruz leaves to the capital city with her sister Solita and starts working as a maid at Alejandro's house, who happens to be her father, without any of them knowing about the bond between them. Maricruz gains his trust and love, and he helps her to get educated and become a high society woman. In the meantime she accepts to help him with the administration of the casino-cruise ship, posted in Isla Dorada. There she will have to face the ambition of the Canseco sisters Carola and Raiza, who keep their lives comfortable at Alejandro's cost. Alejandro's butler; Tobías, discovers Maricruz's birth certificate where her real name appears: María Alejandra Mendoza Olivares. In order to avoid the big impression that could kill Alejandro, since he suffers from a heart disease, he decides not to reveal him that Maricruz is his daughter, but he does tell Maricruz the truth and she feels very happy with such news.

Miguel informs his brother that Maricruz disappeared after her grandfather's death. Octavio arrives in the casino, invited by a friend. Octavio's good looks catch the interest of sophisticated women and he feels flattered, but he cannot forget Maricruz. He doesn't imagine that the humble youngster who used to be his wife is no other than the elegant María Alejandra Mendoza, the heir, manager and main host of the casino-cruise ship.

== Cast ==
=== Main ===
- Ana Brenda Contreras as María de la Cruz "Maricruz" Olivares de Narváez / Maria Alejandra Mendoza Olivares de Narváez
- Daniel Arenas as Octavio Narváez
- Elizabeth Álvarez as Lucía Bravo de Narváez
- César Évora as Alejandro Mendoza

==== Secondary ====
- María Elena Velasco as María
- René Strickler as Miguel Narváez
- Rocío Banquells as Carola Canseco
- Manuel Landeta as Teobaldo
- Ignacio López Tarso as Don Ramiro Olivares
- Ana Patricia Rojo as Raiza Canseco
- Carlos Cámara Jr. as Eusebio Bermúdez / Nazario Bermúdez
- Juan Ángel Esparza as José Antonio
- Isadora González as Simona Irazábal
- Yuliana Peniche as Ofelia
- Gaby Mellado as Soledad "Solita" Olivares (human version of Pulgoso)
- Ricardo Franco as Eduardo Quiroga
- Michelle Ramaglia as Araceli
- Elizabeth Valdez as Esther "Esthercita" Bravo de García
- Antonio Fortier as Tony

=== Recurring ===
- Sergio Goyri as Álvaro Cifuentes
- Maribel Fernández as Dominga
- Ingrid Martz as Doris Montenegro
- Carlos de la Mota as Elemír Karím
- Alejandro Tommasi as Bartolomé Montenegro
- Arleth Terán as Natasha
- Gerardo Arturo as Perico
- Silvia Manríquez as Clementina
- Luis Uribe as Mohamed
- Luis Couturier as Francisco
- Queta Lavat as Lucretia

== Awards and nominations ==
Year	Award	Category	Nominated	Result
2013	People en Español	Best telenovela	Wild at Heart	Nominated
2013	People en Español	Best Actress	Ana Brenda Contreras	Nominated
2013	People en Español	Best Actor	Daniel Arenas	Nominated
2013	People en Español	Best Female Villain	Elizabeth Álvarez	Nominated
2013	People en Español	Best Couple	Ana Brenda Contreras and Daniel Arenas	Nominated
2014	32nd TVyNovelas Awards	Best telenovela	Wild at Heart	Nominated
2014	32nd TVyNovelas Awards	Best Actress	Ana Brenda Contreras	Nominated
2014	32nd TVyNovelas Awards	Best Actor	Daniel Arenas	Nominated
2014	32nd TVyNovelas Awards	Best First Actor	Ignacio López Tarso	Nominated
2014	32nd TVyNovelas Awards	Best Supporting Actor	José Carlos Ruiz	Nominated
2014	32nd TVyNovelas Awards	Best Screenplay or Adaptation	Tere Medina	Nominated
2014	32nd TVyNovelas Awards	Telenovela Multiplatform	Nathalie Lartilleux	Nominated
