= Ana Brenda Contreras =

Mexican-American actress (born 1986)

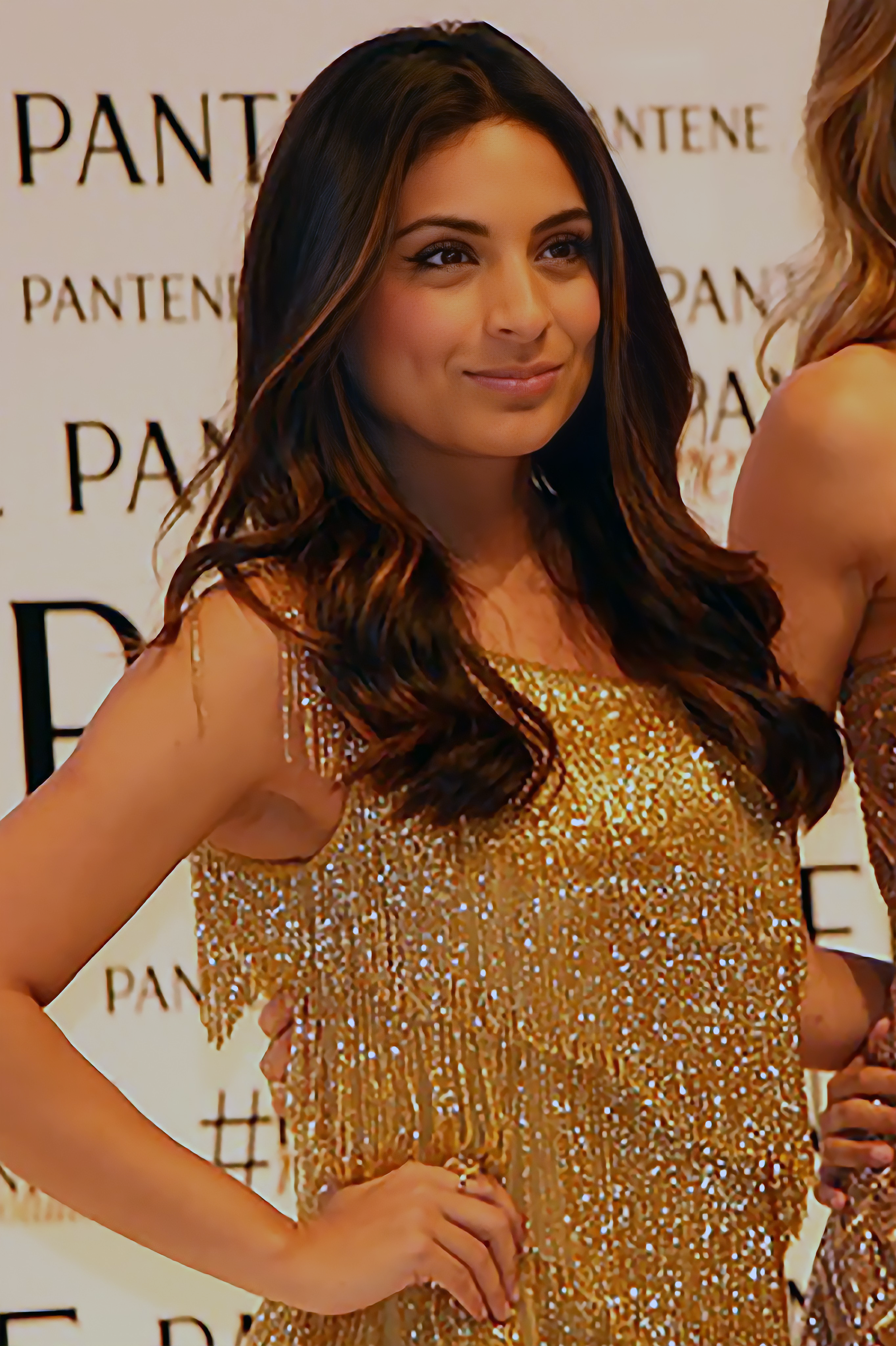
- Contreras in 2015
- Born: 24 December 1986 (age 39); McAllen, Texas, U.S.
- Other name: Ana Brenda
- Occupations: Actress; singer; model; businesswoman
- Years active: 2005–present
- Spouse: Alejandro Amaya (m. 2013; div. 2014)

Ana Brenda Contreras Pérez (born 24 December 1986), also known as Ana Breco, is an American-born Mexican actress, singer, model and businesswoman.

From 2010 to 2011, she played Aurora Alcázar in the telenovela Teresa. From 2018 to 2019, Contreras starred as Cristal Jennings in The CW's series Dynasty, a reboot of the 1980s series of the same name.

== Life and career ==
=== 1986–2014: Early life and career ===
Contreras was born in McAllen, Texas, on 24 December 1986, to Mexican parents Blanca Pérez and Efrain Contreras Puente. She grew up in Río Bravo, Tamaulipas. She speaks both English and Spanish. She moved to Mexico City in 2002 at age 15 to join the reality show Pop Stars, in which she was a finalist and member of a group, T'detila, who released an album with the same name. In 2003, she took acting classes in the Televisa's Centro de Educación Artística (CEA) in Mexico City.

In 2005, Contreras portrayed Juanita Sánchez in her debut telenovela, Barrera de amor. In 2006, she participated in a production of Grease. That same year, Contreras played Claudia in the telenovela Duelo de Pasiones. In 2008, she starred in the film Divina Confusion, directed by Salvador Garcini. From 2008 to 2009, Ana also starred as Violeta Madrigal in the telenovela Juro que te amo. In 2009, she played Maura Albarrán in the telenovela Sortilegio. That same year, she appeared as Marcela Garrido in an episode of the TV series Mujeres asesinas and had a special participation in the original Fox series, Tiempo final.

From 2010 to 2011, Contreras played the lead role of Aurora Alcázar on Teresa. She also played Carol in the musical Timbiriche. Contreras later starred in the telenovela La que no podía amar as Ana Paula Carmona from 2011 to 2012.

In 2013, she portrayed Maricruz Olivarez in the telenovela Corazón indomable, a remake of Marimar which achieved international success. In 2014, Contreras appeared in the Mexican film Volando bajo, directed by Beto Gómez. That same year, she was host of the Premios Juventud. In 2015, Contreras played the lead role of Verónica Prado Castelo in the telenovela Lo imperdonable. She sang "Como perdonar", the telenovela's theme, on the soundtrack.

=== 2015–present: Further acting ===
In 2015, she also starred in the movie Tunnel 19. Contreras starred as Goyita Vera in Blue Demon in 2016, and as Alejandra Ponce in Por amar sin ley in 2018.

From 2018 to 2019, Contreras starred as Cristal Jennings in the second season of The CW's prime time soap opera reboot, Dynasty, in her first English language role.

== Personal life ==
Contreras married Alejandro Amaya in a civil ceremony in Las Vegas on 4 April 2013. On 14 May 2014, she sent a press release announcing the permanent separation from him.

Ana Brenda Contreras divides her time living between Mexico City and Los Angeles, where she develops her career as an actress.

== Filmography ==
=== Film roles ===
| Year | Title | Roles | Notes |
|---|---|---|---|
| 2008 | Divina confusión | Bibi | |
| 2009 | Cabeza de buda | Guest 2 | |
| 2009 | Sombra de Luna | Isabel | Short film |
| 2014 | Volando bajo | Mariana Arredondo | |
| 2017 | El que busca encuentra | Esperanza Medina | |
| 2019 | Wingbeat | Mom | Short film and also director |
| 2022 | Reviviendo la Navidad | Daniela | |

=== Television roles ===
| Year | Title | Roles | Notes |
|---|---|---|---|
| 2005 | Barrera de amor | Juana "Juanita" Sánchez | Series regular; 152 episodes |
| 2006 | Duelo de pasiones | Sonia | Series regular |
| 2008–2009 | Juro que te amo | Violeta Madrigal | Main role; 140 episodes |
| 2009 | Mujeres asesinas | Marcela Garrido | Episode: "Las Garrido, codiciosas" |
| 2009 | Tiempo final | Unknown role | Episode: "Diva" |
| 2009 | Sortilegio | Maura Albarrán | Series regular |
| 2010–2011 | Teresa | Aurora Alcázar | Main role; 152 episodes |
| 2011–2012 | La que no podía amar | Ana Paula Carmona | Main role; 167 episodes |
| 2013 | Corazón indomable | Maricruz Olivares | Main role; 162 episodes |
| 2015 | Lo imperdonable | Verónica | Main role; 118 episodes |
| 2016–2017 | Blue Demon | Goyita Vera | Main role (seasons 1–3); 65 episodes |
| 2018–2019 | Por amar sin ley | Alejandra Ponce | 129 episodes |
| 2018–2019 | Dynasty | Cristal Jennings | Main role (season 2); 22 episodes |
| 2020–2022 | Tu cara me suena | Herself | Host |
| 2020 | Médicos, línea de vida | Alejandra Ponce | 2 episodes |
| 2022 | Toda la sangre | Edith Mondragón | Main role |
| 2024 | El Conde: Amor y honor | Mariana Zambrano | Main role |
| 2024–present | ¿Quién es la máscara? | Ranastacia Herself | Contestant (season 6) Panelist (season 7) |
| 2026 | Polen | Sandra Fitzgerald | Main role |

== Awards and nominations ==
=== Premios Diosas de Plata ===
| Year | Category | Film | Result |
|---|---|---|---|
| 2009 | Female Revelation | Divina confusión | Won |
| 2015 | Special Performance by an Actress | Volando bajo | Nominated |

=== Premios ACPT ===
| Year | Category | Show | Result |
|---|---|---|---|
| 2017 | Best Musical Actress | El Hombre De La Mancha | Nominated |

=== TVyNovelas Awards ===
| Year | Category | Telenovela | Result |
|---|---|---|---|
| 2011 | Best Co-star Actress | Teresa | Nominated |
| 2012 | Best Actress | La que no podía amar | Nominated |
| 2014 | Best Actress | Corazón indomable | Nominated |
| 2014 | Favorite Couple with Daniel Arenas | Corazón indomable | Nominated |
| 2014 | Favorite Slap with Elizabeth Álvarez | Corazón indomable | Nominated |
| 2014 | The Most Beautiful Girl | Corazón indomable | Nominated |
| 2014 | Best Actress | Corazón indomable | Nominated |
| 2017 | Best Actress in Series | Blue Demon | Won |
| 2019 | Best Actress | Por amar sin ley | Nominated |
| 2020 | Best Actress | Por amar sin ley | Eliminated |

=== Premios Juventud ===
| Year | Category | Title of Work | Result |
|---|---|---|---|
| 2012 | Girl That Takes Your Sleep Away | La que no podía amar | Won |
| 2014 | Girl That Takes Your Sleep Away | Corazón Indomable | Nominated |
| 2014 | She's Got Style | | Won |
| 2016 | My Favourite Protagonist | Lo imperdonable | Nominated |

=== People en Español ===
| Year | Category | Telenovela | Result |
|---|---|---|---|
| 2012 | Best Actress | La que no podía amar | Nominated |
| 2012 | Best Couple with Jorge Salinas | La que no podía amar | Won |
| 2013 | Best Actress | Corazón indomable | Nominated |
| 2013 | Best Couple with Daniel Arenas | Corazón indomable | Nominated |
