= Alma de ángel =

Mexican comedy television series

- Genre: Comedy
- Created by: Jurgan Jacobo
- Written by: Jurgan Jacobo; Maurico Jalife
- Directed by: Juan Carlos de Llaca
- Starring: Niurka Marcos; Verónica Jaspeado; Juan Ugarte; Raúl Araiza; Lizeth Goca; Diego Tenorio; Julio Bracho
- Country of origin: Mexico
- Original language: Spanish
- No. of seasons: 1
- No. of episodes: 13

Production
- Executive producer: Nazareno P. Brancatto
- Production company: Televisa

Original release
- Network: Las Estrellas
- Release: 2 September – 25 November 2019

Alma de ángel is a Mexican comedy television series produced by Nazareno P. Brancatto for Televisa that aired on Las Estrellas from 2 September 2019 to 25 November 2019. The series stars Niurka Marcos.

== Plot ==
Ángel is devastated by the sudden death of his wife Alma, with whom he had lived with for 20 years. Everything happened so suddenly, that Ángel has no idea how to process it. Alma is in the same situation, she doesn't know that she is dead and is trapped in her house, until she resolves her problems on earth. Heaven and hell will dispute her soul, while she tries to take care of her family, being a ghost that can only communicate with her loved ones through the body of Paco, Ángel's best friend.

== Cast ==
=== Main ===
- Niurka Marcos as Alma
- Julio Bracho as Ángel
- Raúl Araiza as Paco
- Verónica Jaspeado as Demonio Gloria
- Juan Ugarte as Arcángel Uriel
- Diego Tenorio as Juan José Rivapalacio
- Lizeth Goca as Alexa Rivapalacio

=== Recurring ===
- Adrián Di Monte as Dios

== Production ==
Filming of the first season began on 23 May 2019 and concluded on 21 June 2019. The season consisted of 13 episodes.

== Episodes ==
No.	Title	Original release date
1	"Alma regresa a casa"	2 September 2019 (Note: Premiered early online through Las Estrellas website on 28 August 2019.)
Ángel says goodbye to Alma at her funeral, thinking that death did him the favor of taking her away, but Alma returns from the beyond in spirit form to fix everything she did wrong in life.
2	"Pamela (la ex)"	9 September 2019
Paco teaches Ángel to use an app to find a partner, that's where he finds his ex-girlfriend, Pamela. Alma will look for ways to ruin his date, with the help of Paco's body. Guest star: Aleida Núñez as Pamela
3	"Marilyn (La hija del patrón)"	16 September 2019
Ángel returns to his office after mourning Alma and all his companions look at him differently. Marilyn, the daughter of the company owner, asks for help at night to complete an accounting balance. Guest star: Mariana Botas as Marilyn
4	"Lorena (La trabajadora doméstica)"	23 September 2019
Ángel hires a beautiful young domestic worker, but Alma only sees a gold digging social climber. Guest star: Paola Ramones as Lorena
5	"Esmeralda (La medium)"	30 September 2019
Alexa and Juanjo discover Paco sleeping with their dad. But Paco is connected to Alma and now she feels things for Ángel. Esmeralda, the medium, tries to make contact with Alma. Guest star: Nora Salinas as Esmeralda, Emilio Osorio, Joaquín Bondoni
6	"Marcela (La prima)"	7 October 2019
Marcela, Alma's cousin, comes to visit and puts the house up for sale. Alma has to solve the problems with God and Marcela, using Paco's body to do it. Guest star: Claudia Acosta as Marcela
7	"Yolanda (La corredora)"	14 October 2019
Alma suspects of Ángel after seeing him chat very friendly and sets him up. Medellín fires Paco and Ángel thinking they are a gay couple. Alma seeks Yolanda to clarify things very much in her own way. Guest star: Claudia Martín as Yolanda
8	"La Doctora"	21 October 2019
Alexa and Juanjo suffer when Ángel decides to settle down to work from home. Juanjo ends up hospitalized and Alma asks God for permission to go see him, but everything goes wrong when her jealousy is unleashed. Guest star: Ingrid Coronado as Renée
9	"El beso (de Ángel y Paco)"	28 October 2019
God lets Alma say goodbye to her family before sending her to hell. Paco suffers the consequences of possessions and loses control of himself. Alma saves his life.
10	"Paty y Pamela (Las lagartonas)"	4 November 2019
God forgives Alma for saving Paco, but gives her a lesson. Ángel and Paco go out to party and meet some girls that make them see their luck. Alma possesses Paco again, this time forever.
11	"La Bruja y el Cazador de almas"	11 November 2019
Alma in Paco's body makes her home a disaster. God sends the ruthless Soul Hunter to look for Alma's soul. Ángel finds a way to protect Paco from his wife.
12	"El Exorcismo"	18 November 2019
With Gloria's help, Alma removes the amulet from Paco and returns to his body. Ángel has no choice but to take a priest to exorcise Paco, but everything goes wrong.
13	"Paco y la cebolla"	25 November 2019
Alma is in danger of disappearing. Gloria manifests herself to Ángel to deceive him. Paco, in a heroic gesture, saves Alma.
