= Niurka Marcos =

Cuban-Mexican actress and performer

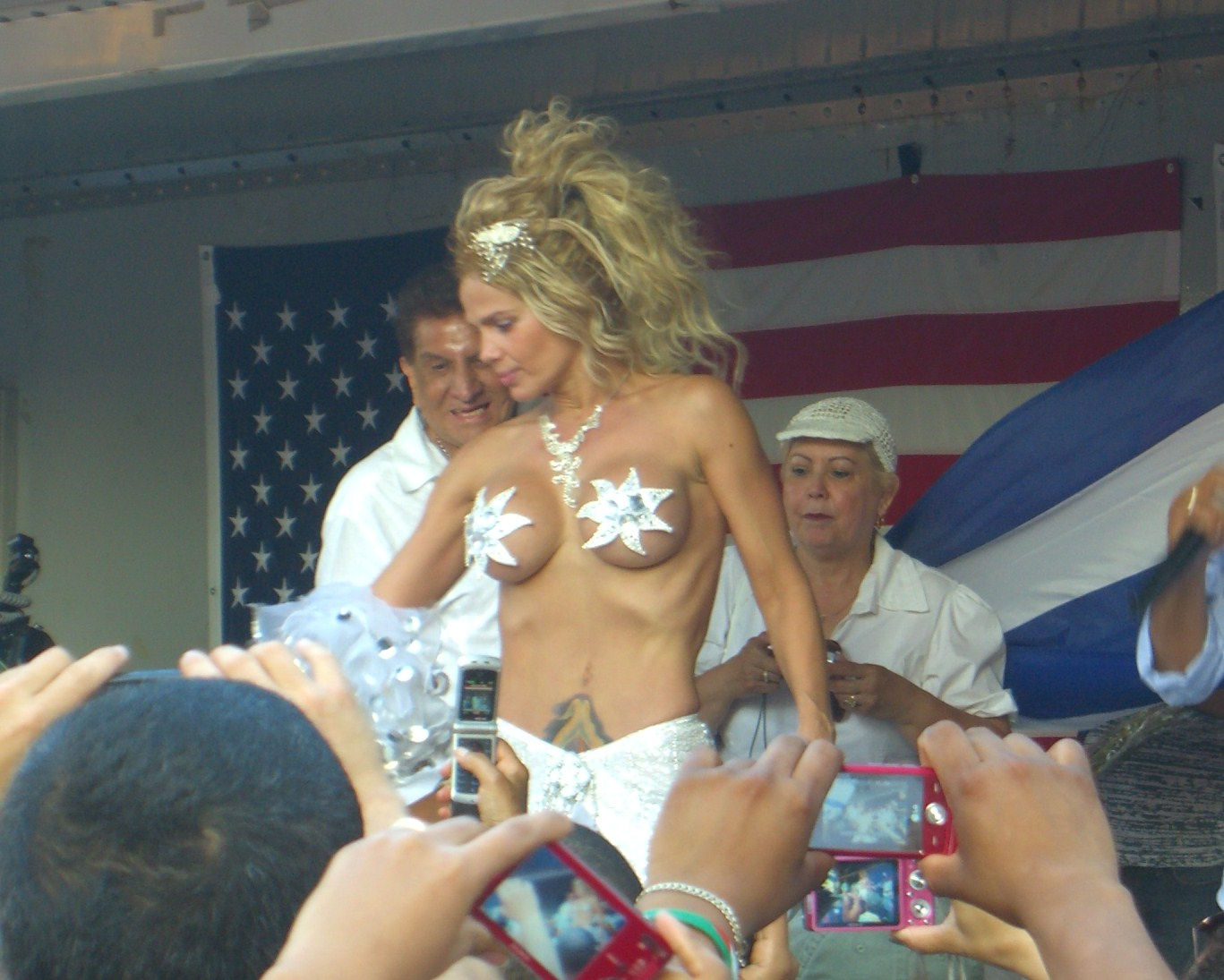
- Marcos in 2010
- Born: Niurka Marcos Calle; 24 November 1967 (age 58); Havana, Cuba
- Other names: La Mujer Escándalo; La Reina del escenario; La Emperadora; La Cubana de Fuego
- Citizenship: Cuba (1967-present); Mexico (2002-present)
- Occupations: Singer; actress; dancer
- Spouses: Bobby Larios (m. 2004; div. 2006) Yanixán Texido (m. 2007; div. 2011)

Niurka Marcos Calle (born 24 November 1967) is a Cuban vedette, actress, dancer and singer.

== Personal life ==
Marcos was born in Havana, Cuba to Carmelo Marcos, a Cuban navy major, and Salustiana "Celeste" Calle, a housewife. She has five siblings: Martha, Maribel, Thomas, María del Carmen, and Ernesto.

In 2003, Marcos dated actor Bobby Larios. They subsequently married, but their marriage ended in divorce. Marcos then married Yanixán Texido in 2007. The couple separated in May 2009, and on February 6, 2011, they divorced.

She was part of the first group of foreigners naturalized by President Vicente Fox, and has three Mexican-born children: Itzcoatl "Kiko", Romina, and Emilio.

In 2018, Marcos stated in an interview that her mother had died.

== Career ==
Marcos starred in the telenovela Velo de Novia, produced by her then-boyfriend Juan Osorio. In 2001, Marcos portrayed an erotic dancer named Karicia in the Mexican soap opera Salomé starring Edith González and Guy Ecker, for which she earned a TVyNovelas Award for Best Supporting Actress at the 20th TVyNovelas Awards.In 2002 gave birth to her son Emilio product of her relationship with Osorio. In 2004, she was a contestant on the reality series Big Brother México. She appeared as a supporting actress on La Fea Más Bella during 2006 and sang on its soundtrack album on the track "Se Busca Un Hombre." In 2007, she released an album titled La Emperadora and posed for the February 2007 issue of the Mexican edition of Playboy magazine.

She started her own show in 2008 called Espectacularmente Niurka. She also hosts El Show De Niurka which features games, dancing, singing and a jacuzzi in which she interviews other artists. Marcos was cast for a theatrical remake of La ronda de las arpías in August 2009. In 2011, Marcos joined the cast of Emperatriz as the new villain.

== Discography ==
- Alcatraz Es... Dulce (1999)
- Latin Pop (2001)
- La Emperadora (2007)
- Niurka Marcos (2021)

== Filmography ==
=== Television ===
Year	Title	Role	Notes
1998	Vivo Por Elena	Myrtha	Recurring role
1998	Gotita de amor	Constanza	Recurring role
1999	Nunca te olvidaré	Alcatráz Cordero	Recurring role
1999	Tres mujeres	Yamilé Nuñez	Recurring role
2001	Salomé	Karicia	Supporting role
2003–2004	Velo de novia	Vida	Supporting role
2004	Big Brother México	Herself	Contestant (season 3)
2004	Corazones al límite	Dulce María	Recurring role
2004	Escándalo TV de noche	Herself	Co-host
2006–2007	La fea más bella	Paula María Conde	Supporting role
2008	Fuego en la sangre	Maracuya	Recurring role
2008	Espectacularmente Niurka	Herself	Host
2008	El Show de Niurka	Herself	Host
2010	Mira quién baila	Herself	Participant (season 1)
2011	Ella es Niurka	Herself	Host
2011	Emperatriz	Ángela 'Quimera' Galván	Recurring role
2012	La mujer de Judas	Ricarda Araujo	Recurring role
2014	Mi corazón es tuyo	Herself	Guest role
2014	Soy tu doble	Herself	Judge
2015–2017	Rica, Famosa, Latina	Herself	Main role (seasons 3-5)
2016	El minuto que cambió mi destino	Herself	Documentary
2019	Alma de ángel	Alma Marcela Silva	Main role
2022; 2025	La casa de los famosos	Herself	Participant (seasons 2 and 5)

== Other ==
- 2007: "Que Lloren" (Music video by Ivy Queen)
