= Mi marido tiene más familia =

- Season 2
- Starring: Zuria Vega; Daniel Arenas; Diana Bracho; Arath de la Torre; Susana González; Carmen Salinas; Silvia Pinal; Gabriel Soto
- No. of episodes: 167

Release
- Original network: Las Estrellas
- Original release: 9 July 2018 – 24 February 2019

The second and final season of Mi marido tiene familia, a Mexican telenovela produced by Juan Osorio, was ordered on 18 October 2017. The season premiered on Las Estrellas on 9 July 2018 and ended on 24 February 2019.

== Plot ==
Julieta (Zuria Vega) and Robert (Daniel Arenas) have to divide their time between being parents, being children, being siblings and fulfilling in their work, but above all not losing their communication as a couple. Everything will get complicated for Julieta, when her new boss Susana (Susana González) arrives, who will face the dilemma of many women: balance her role as mother, wife and professional. For his part, Robert will discover that he has other relatives, so that Julieta's political family will increase and also the conflicts with the other members of the Córcega family.

== Cast ==
=== Main ===
- Zuria Vega as Julieta Aguilar
- Daniel Arenas as Robert Cooper / Juan Pablo
- Diana Bracho as Blanca Gómez de Córcega
- Arath de la Torre as Pancho López
- Susana González as Susana Córcega Díaz
- Carmen Salinas as Crisanta Díaz
- Silvia Pinal as Imelda Sierra de Córcega
- Gabriel Soto as Ernesto "Neto" Rey

=== Recurring and guest ===
- Rafael Inclán as Eugenio Córcega
- Patricio Castillo as Massimo
- Juan Diego Covarrubias as Carlos Rojas
- René Casados as Audifaz Córcega
- Olivia Bucio as Catalina Rivera
- Regina Orozco as Amalia Gómez
- Carlos Bracho as Canuto Córcega Rodríguez
- Laura Vignati as Daniela Córcega
- José Pablo Minor as Gabriel Musi
- Violeta Isfel as Clarissa
- Jade Fraser as Linda Córcega
- Gaby Platas as Amapola Casteñeda
- Emilio Osorio as Aristóteles Córcega
- Bárbara Islas as Diana Mejía
- Cecilia Gabriela as Tania
- Ana Jimena Villanueva as Cassandra
- Gonzalo Vega Jr. as Axel Legorreta Córcega
- Germán Bracco as Guido
- Ignacio Casano as Hugo Aguilar
- Marco Muñoz as Tulio Córcega
- Isabella Tena as Frida Meneses
- Marcos Montero as Ignacio Meneses
- Luis Gerardo Cuburu as Octavio
- Latin Lover as Enzo
- Carlos Madrigal as Vicente Legorreta
- Susy Lu as Aura
- Paola Archer as Eréndira
- Jessidey León as Zenda
- Rodrigo Pérez as Sebastián
- Ruy Rodrigo as David
- Salvador Ibarra as Fernando
- Alex Rosguer as Iker
- Azúl Guaita as Yolotl Rey
- José Pablo Alanís as Andy Rey
- José Manuel Alanís as Santi Rey
- Pietro Vannucci as Luigi
- Carla Carrillo as Grecia
- Joaquín Bondoni as Cuauhtémoc "Temo" López
- Nikolás Caballero as Diego
- Alisson Coronado as Ana Lupe "Lupita" López Treviño
- Emiliano Vázquez as Julio López Treviño
- Romina Marcos as Sasha
- Roberto González as Lázaro
- Santiago Zenteno as Lic. Eduardo Rey
- Arturo Guízar as Ruffo
- Gala de la Torre as Gala
- Karla Gómez as Ariana
- Mayrín Villanueva as Rebeca Treviño (guest stars)

== Episodes ==
No. overall	No. in season	Title	Original release date	Mexico viewers (millions)
103	1	"Julieta conoce a Susana Córcega, su nueva jefa"	9 July 2018	3.3
Julieta is sure that being a mom and a successful professional at the same time is possible and she does not need to give up dreams, but after meeting her new boss, she may change her mind. The Córcega family commemorates Grandfather Canuto. Tito arrives in Oaxaca with much mystery. Imelda and Crisanta meet and start their competition. Julieta is disturbed by Susana's surname.
104	2	"Canuto confiesa que tiene otra familia"	10 July 2018	3.3
Canuto confesses to Axel that he has lied all his life, because in reality he has another family, a wife and three children. Julieta investigates if Susana has to do with Robert's family. Sebastián becomes friends with David after defending him. Julieta and Robert have a problem because they can not divide their time. Daniela and Gabriel deliver the order of the alebrijes broken.
105	3	"Julieta debe separarse de Blanquita"	11 July 2018	3.0
Susana can not close the investment and blames Julieta for all the chaos caused by her family, so she asks that she no longer take Blanquita to the office. Daniela and Gabriel have a problem due to the breach of contract. Blanca is hurt by Eugenio's attitude. Tito hides from Imelda. Robert gives Tito bad news.
106	4	"Imelda descubre que Canuto está en Oaxaca"	12 July 2018	3.4
Canuto and Imelda meet again, the secret they have kept for years is about to be discovered. Blanca confronts Daniela and Gabriel and decides to take Frida to live with her. Robert discusses with Julieta for his course. Julieta confronts Susana. Sebastián and Axel communicate with their father. Julieta resists that Blanca takes care of her children.
107	5	"Pancho López llega al edificio Córcega"	13 July 2018	3.2
A new tenant arrives at the Córcega building, Pancho López, accompanied by his children Temo, Julio, and Lupita. Imelda confronts Canuto and warns him that she does not want him in her life. Julieta flees from work. Blanca complains to Julieta to spend time with her grandchildren. Temo is impressed to know Aristóteles.
108	6	"Robert descubre que Canuto es su abuelo"	16 July 2018	3.3
Robert discovers that Canuto is his grandfather when he sees David and Sebastián's family tree project. Blanca tries to discover what is behind the great sadness of Pancho. Temo keeps a secret for his dad. Julieta proposes to Susana a new strategy, she hinders it.
109	7	"Imelda ya no puede escapar del pasado"	17 July 2018	3.7
Robert confronts Imelda to tell her that he already knows her secret, and although she left Canuto dead, he returned to Oaxaca, has another family and very soon everyone will know the truth. Imelda plots a plan against Crisanta. Susana questions her father about his origins. Eugenio and Audifaz miss their father.
110	8	"Blanca intenta averiguar el secreto de Pancho"	18 July 2018	3.4
The Córcega suspect that Pancho hides something because he has a lot of money and could be fleeing from the police. Despite that, Blanca decides to approach him to find out what his secret is. Robert reveals to Blanca the secret of Imelda. Julieta shows a mess in her office for a nanny and Susana discovers her. Julieta finds out that Susana is from her family and infuriates with Robert.
111	9	"Imelda le pide a Robert que respete su pasado"	19 July 2018	2.9
Imelda prevents Robert from telling her past to Julieta. Eugenio has memories of his father and wonders what would happen if he had not died, but Canuto is about to meet him. Imelda attacks the business of Crisanta. Susana is losing moments with her family for working too much. Daniela and Gabriel have their date, but the presence of Axel changes everything. Dave is worried after knowing that he has to stay with a babysitter and Julieta is late to get to work.
112	10	"Tito se reencuentra con sus hijos"	20 July 2018	3.3
Hugo's cookies end up hurting badly to a large part of the company, including Susana, causing the rivalry with Julieta to grow. Susana accuses Hugo and Julieta of wanting to poison her and decides to proceed legally against them. Robert finds chaos in his house. David and Sebastián manage to fire the nanny thanks to their mischief. Catalina reveals her guilt to Julieta. Tito spends a weekend next to Imelda and his sons. Susana suffers because her children do not see her as her mother.
113	11	"Dave está apunto de morir"	23 July 2018	3.2
Canuto saves Dave from drowning, and becomes the hero of the Córcega family. Blanca is not sure she can continue to silence Imelda's secret, while Susana plans to sue Hugo. Pancho gives Robert some advice, he does not take it well. Aristóteles and Temo strengthen their friendship. Imelda asks Robert to give her time to tell the truth.
114	12	"Julieta descubre que Susana es parte de su familia"	24 July 2018	3.0
Pancho and Susana meet again at their children's school, when she asks for Rebeca, Pancho tells her that she did not go to Oaxaca with them. Imelda confesses to Blanca the whole truth about Canuto. Robert tells Julieta that he has more family and she is upset with him for not telling her the truth. Gabriel tells Daniela that he wants a son. Tito visits his sons, Imelda asks him to leave his family.
115	13	"Catalina pone en su lugar a Susana"	25 July 2018	3.2
Catalina confronts Susana and admits that she poisoned the cookies, but she can not get Hugo to escape the lawsuit. Pancho confesses to Blanca part of his past with which their friendship grows. Blanca is surprised to learn that Eugenio has a half sister. Julieta insinuates Susana that her family can be hers. Daniela uploads a video to Gabriel's social networks making a fool of himself.
116	14	"Susana y Pancho casi tienen un accidente"	26 July 2018	3.5
Susana and Pancho are reunited but in a very tragic way, they were about to have a car crash, although they avoided it and only remained in shock. Cassandra's remedy affects Julieta's performance. Robert promises Dave that there will be no more nannies. Tito goes to confess his secret, but Blanca tells him that it is up to Imelda to tell the truth. Susana decides to change her attitude and withdraws the lawsuit against Hugo.
117	15	"Susana se entera que Canuto está enfermo"	27 July 2018	3.0
The wounds of Tito do not close so he is forced to confess to Susana that he has diabetes. Catalina has a damage in her house, so she must go live with Julieta and Robert. Robert discusses with Julieta about nannies and that Blanca takes care of their children. David feels guilty about the fight. Imelda fears that her children will not understand her or forgive her. Temo can not tell his secret to Pancho. Eugenio gets sad after losing the only memory he had of his father.
118	16	"Robert promete unir a la familia Córcega"	30 July 2018	3.3
Julieta has to go back to Blanca to take care of her children. Canuto makes Robert promise that he will unite the original Córcega with the new Córcega. Susana finds out that Robert is Tito's doctor. Imelda realizes Amalia's betrayal. Julieta suffers an unexpected faint.
119	17	"Imelda está apunto de confesar su secreto"	31 July 2018	3.2
The truth is about to come to light, while Robert convinces Imelda to confess the truth to her children, Susana discovers the photo of the other family of Canuto. Blanquita is sick and Blanca tells her parents, Julieta vanishes and can not talk. Blanca reluctantly accepts that Julieta installs cameras in her house with the condition that she accepts a list of suggestions.
120	18	"Susana escucha una fuerte confesión de su padre"	1 August 2018	3.0
Canuto can no longer hide the secret he has kept for many years and decides to confess to his daughter Susana that he has another family. She reacts very surprised. Julieta tells Robert that she will not support him to unite the Córcega. Blanca advises Daniela about marriage and love. Julieta listens to Gabriel about everyday life and love. Julieta installs the monitors at Blanca's house.
121	19	"Imelda confiesa que Canuto está vivo"	2 August 2018	3.4
Imelda confesses to her children that she has lied to them, Canuto Córcega is alive. The news causes a total crisis between Eugenio, Tulio and Audifaz. Tito is proud of his children. Robert will not allow the foundation to be closed. Daniela believes that her marriage is not working. Julieta realizes that Susana has discovered everything. Pancho gives Susana strength.
122	20	"Susana acepta que Julieta es su sobrina política"	3 August 2018	3.0
Susana faces the truth and admits to Julieta that they are family. Blanca and Catalina start a competition to become the best grandmother. Eugenio can not process his mother's lie. Pancho prevents his children from talking about their mother. Tito believes that the best thing for all Córcega is that he dies. Axel helps improve the relationship between Daniela and Gabriel. Tito will not rest until Imelda forgives him.
123	21	"Susana no está dispuesta a convivir con Julieta"	6 August 2018	3.6
Susana gets drunk and warns Julieta that she does not want to coexist with her as a family, and if she is not up to the job, it is best to leave. Blanca and Catalina ask Pancho to help them decide who is the best grandmother. Canuto introduces himself with his children. Robert asks Vicente for help for the foundation. Robert and Pancho dispute Blanca's attention.
124	22	"Crisanta se entera que Canuto tiene otra familia"	7 August 2018	3.1
Susana asks Pancho to go pick her up because she can not drive, but in front of him, her world collapses. Susana can not continue lying and she confesses the truth to Crisanta. Temo is attracted to Aristóteles, he fears disappointing his father. Aristóteles asks his parents to accept him as he is. Tito expresses to Robert what he feels for Imelda. Julieta makes decisions in the absence of Susana.
125	23	"Crisanta le exige a Canuto que le diga la verdad"	8 August 2018	3.0
Crisanta is shocked to learn that Canuto has lied to her for 50 years, because he never told her that he had another wife, let alone three children. Daniela finds out that Axel is her cousin. Linda communicates with her parents. Canuto continues to give problems to Imelda. Susana complains to Julieta for the decisions in her absence. Crisanta asks Tito to render accounts for what he has hidden from her for years.
126	24	"Susana decide enfrentar a la familia de Imelda"	9 August 2018	3.4
Julieta made a serious mistake, so Susana makes her see that she is not up to work and should resign. Julieta returns the suggestion to Susana. Robert organizes a meal with the original Córcega, warns them of a danger to the family. Crisanta makes Tito leave their home and the remaining family suffers this decision. Faced with the crisis that her parents are living, Susana faces Tito's other family.
127	25	"Linda regresa a Oaxaca"	10 August 2018	3.1
Susana gives the Córcega the concern for her father, Imelda tells her that with them she will not find the answers she is looking for. Robert does not have the support of Susana to unite the two families. Imelda and Tito recognize their mistakes before their sons. Linda returns to Oaxaca, but wants to have a triumphant return and asks Julieta and Robert to keep the secret of her arrival.
128	26	"Imelda descubre que Crisanta es su rival"	13 August 2018	2.8
Imelda discovers that Crisanta is the woman for whom Canuto left her. The Córcega family receives Linda as she likes. Pancho confesses what happened to Rebecca. Julieta explains to David his kinship with Sebastián. Crisanta tells Susana her love story with Tito.
129	27	"Axel está a punto de atropellar a Linda"	14 August 2018	2.8
Linda and Axel have a bumpy meeting at the hospital, although the two try to be indifferent, they can not hide their interest. Canuto confesses to Eugenio that he continues to love Imelda. Crisanta explains to Imelda that she did not know Canuto's secret. Imelda tells Canuto that their love no longer exists. Vicente Legorreta arrives in Oaxaca, he is more demanding than Robert expected. David reproaches Juliet for her abandonment. Ignacio reappears.
130	28	"Robert le pide a Pancho que se aleje de su familia"	15 August 2018	2.8
Robert can not bear to see Pancho close to his family and confronts him to demand that he leave. Love arises between Linda and Axel, but Daniela is in charge of informing them that they have the same blood. Julieta notices that Robert is insecure. Catalina loses Julieta's engagement ring. Susana and Pancho meet, Vicente arrives for a surprise visit. Robert does not agree with Eugenio uniting his parents.
131	29	"Julieta le pide a su mamá que se vaya de la casa"	16 August 2018	2.9
Julieta does not want her mother to continue generating chaos in the house and asks her to leave, Catalina reminds her that she has no money and begs her for piety. Julieta accepts, but she must look for a job. Canuto does everything possible to unite his family, and to reconquer his family. Axel accepts that the kiss that was given with Linda, will be hard to forget. Pancho makes a proposal to Susana, Sebastián does not accept their relationship. Temo comforts Aristóteles, he wants to confess something important to him. Robert feels impotent for his crises. David wants to meet his biological father.
132	30	"Robert estalla en celos por culpa de Vicente"	17 August 2018	2.8
Doña Imelda confesses that she never lost hope that Canuto would return and she did not stop loving him either. Robert finds out that Julieta met Vicente at Susana's house and explodes in jealousy once more. Julieta is worried if David met his father. Susana reproaches Vicente for being away from his children. Julieta retrieves her ring.
133	31	"Susana le exige a Canuto que elija con qué familia quiere estar"	20 August 2018	2.9
Susana creates a scandal at Imelda's house because she does not think that Canuto should spend time with his other family, she demands that he decide who he wants to be with. Robert feels jealous of Dr. Legorreta every time he approaches Julieta. Tulio asserts that Canuto's other family could take away their estate.
134	32	"Canuto muere rodeado de su familia"	21 August 2018	2.7
Imelda and Crisanta are invited to dance for their families. Canuto clarifies to Imelda that he never stopped loving her, Crisanta is about to face them but Canuto suffers a heart attack that ends his life. Julieta has to give the terrible news to Susana.
135	33	"Susana se culpa por la muerte de padre"	22 August 2018	2.9
After the death of Canuto, the Córcega families are more disunited than ever. Doña Imelda and Crisanta fight over the ashes of Canuto, so the hatred between them grows. Susana is very affected by the death of her father, she feels guilty. Robert gives the whole family the promise he made to Tito, Crisanta and Susana hold the other Córcega responsible for Tito's death and reject the family union.
136	34	"Tulio cree que Crisanta y Susana les podrían quitar el edificio"	23 August 2018	2.9
Crisanta and Susana find out that Canuto owns the building where Imelda and her sons live. Crisanta thinks about depriving Doña Imelda and her family of their house. Tulio wants to get closer to his father's other family to prevent them from taking everything away. Sebastián questions Susana the hatred between families. Robert advises Eugenio to approach Susana. The sports Olympiad begins at school. Temo and Aristóteles suffer the consequences of the sabotage of Julio and Dorian. Dave reacts violently.
137	35	"Tulio está a punto de traicionar a su familia"	24 August 2018	2.5
Tulio looks for Susana and Crisanta to tell them that he is on their side, wants to know them better and wants to help them. Linda tries to support Axel for the death of his grandfather, but Eugenio does not allow it. Daniela points out to Linda that her relationship with Axel is a forbidden love. Dave suffers an accident, Julieta is warned, but manages to control herself and close a very important contract for the company. Hugo and Catalina start their business.
138	36	"Temo reconoce sus sentimientos por Ari"	27 August 2018	2.7
Lupita discovers Temo's secret. He talks to Lupita about his feelings for Aristóteles, she promises to keep his secret, but Temo can not keep hiding his love. Robert gathers the Córcega to start a family intervention. During the family intervention, Julieta explodes against the Córcega and puts Doña Imelda in her place. Crisanta thinks about getting revenge on Imelda, for the pain caused to her family. Susana expresses to Pancho her fear that Crisanta would take a stand against the other Córcega. Frida's secret friend is not how she thinks.
139	37	"Julieta descubre que Temo está enamorado de Aristóteles"	28 August 2018	2.7
By coincidence, Julieta discovers that Temo is in love with Aristóteles. Julieta is convinced that Aristóteles is gay, so she asks Robert for help to try not to let his family reject them. Crisanta swears that Imelda will know the shame, Susana asks Tito to give him strength to survive the torment.
140	38	"Daniela quiere separarse de Gabriel"	29 August 2018	2.9
Daniela proposes to Gabriel to live in separate homes to try to save their marriage. Crisanta begins her revenge against Imelda and arrives with her bags ready to occupy an apartment in the Córcega building. Axel and Linda have a secret date in an unusual place, they get into a mess. Julieta and Robert are worried about David.
141	39	"La verdadera mamá de David regresa"	30 August 2018	3.0
David misses his real mom, despite being a terrible blow to Julieta, they meet again. Crisanta decides to settle in Pancho's house, to steal the patrimony of Doña Imelda. The Córcega do not know how to react to the situation, and Tulio takes advantage of the problems. He warns Imelda that Crisanta could know her secrets. Crisanta is not going to stop until she retaliates and threatens to make several changes in the Córcega building. The Córcega's forbid Axel and Linda to see each other again.
142	40	"Gabriel cae en una fuerte depresión"	31 August 2018	2.7
Gabriel begins to believe that he and Daniela got married very quickly and there is no longer enough love to continue their marriage. Julieta finds out that David's real father is in jail. Robert and Pancho create chaos outside the building. Doña Imelda and Crisanta are close to hitting each other to defend their supposed patrimony. Hugo and Catalina have problems with their business. Audifaz looks for a way in his life.
143	41	"Daniela y Gabriel deciden separarse"	3 September 2018	3.0
Gabriel and Daniela's marriage is no longer working, although they still love each other, neither of them is fine and they decide to take time to reflect on their relationship. Julieta defends Susana from Dr. Legorreta, since he believes that women can not perform a man's job. Aristóteles goes to therapy and manifests what he feels for Temo. Blanca is upset with Pancho for supporting Crisanta. David celebrates his birthday and wishes to meet his biological father. Linda discovers Frida's secret.
144	42	"Catalina quiere trabajar con Susana"	4 September 2018	2.8
Catalina finds out that Susana is looking for an assistant and decides to apply for the vacancy, but Julieta does not agree. Pancho looks for Robert to try to solve their differences, but Robert does not take the visit in a good way. Axel and Linda look for a moment to be alone, but without accepting that they are in love. Daniela returns with her parents. Imelda tells Robert and Julieta to assume the consequences of having an adopted son. Julieta wants to meet David's dad.
145	43	"Yela pone a Dave en contra de Julieta"	5 September 2018	3.3
The Córcega join in David's birthday party, but everything gets complicated with the arrival of Yela, his biological mother. Yela tells David that Julieta should tell him about his biological father. Audifaz closes his mind more and more and explodes at David's party. Crisanta continues in her eternal fight for the building with Imelda. Daniela asks her family to respect her decision. The marriage certificate of Imelda is lost.
146	44	"Linda y Axel aceptan que están enamorados"	6 September 2018	2.5
Linda accepts she likes Axel but it is a complicated relationship because they are cousins and their families would never accept it. The party goes out of control. Audifaz evicts Aristóteles from his home. Crisanta learns that Canuto was already dead much sooner than she thought. David continues with rebellious behavior, and rejects Julieta as his mother. Susana begins to fall before the charms of Pancho.
147	45	"Robert rescata a Frida y Lupita"	7 September 2018	2.6
Frida and Lupita are deceived with the idea of knowing the supposed Camilo, but Robert and Julieta arrive in time to prevent them from being kidnapped. Crisanta questions Imelda about the death of Canuto from years ago. Ignacio claims Blanca for Frida's publicity. Julieta knows that David's father can fight for his custody.
148	46	"Daniela se enfrenta con Ignacio"	10 September 2018	3.0
Ignacio returns with the intention of taking Frida, but Daniela puts him in his place and demands that he leave her family in peace. Crisanta believes that it is time to divide the ashes of Canuto. David is jealous of his sister, and his desire to meet his real parents grows. Julieta proposes to Robert to help Daniela and Gabriel in their relationship.
149	47	"Julieta y Robert tienen una noche romántica"	11 September 2018	3.0
With the help of Blanca, Julieta and Robert manage to disconnect from reality to live a romantic night away from their children, but family problems affect their life as a couple. Linda and Axel turn on the fire alarm so they will not be discovered. Axel and Sebastián are against Susana. Crisanta makes a proposal to Imelda, but with a condition.
150	48	"Robert le confiesa a David que su papá biológico está en la carcel"	12 September 2018	2.7
Robert decides to tell Dave the truth about his biological father, although for Julieta it is not the right thing to do. Pancho's children break the urn of Canuto, and think about how to tell the truth to the Córcega. Crisanta blames Imelda for stealing the ashes.
151	49	"Julieta inscribe a Daniela y Gabriel en "Reality de amor""	13 September 2018	2.7
Daniela and Gabriel are surprised to learn that they were one of the couples selected to enter the "Reality de amor". Tulio manages to find David's biological father, so Robert begs Julieta to accompany him to meet him. Crisanta buys from Amalia information about Imelda. Imelda's fashion show takes place and Crisanta spoils it. Pancho discovers the secret of Audifaz. Temo arms himself with courage and declares his love to Aristóteles.
152	50	"Julieta y Robert conocen al papá de David"	14 September 2018	2.8
Julieta accompanies Robert to the jail to meet David's biological father, where they find out that Yela lied to them, and he is about to go free and ready to see his son. Aristóteles breaks Temo's heart by telling him that he is not gay. Crisanta discovers the false death certificate of Canuto, for which Doña Imelda is immediately arrested by the authorities. Susana and Pancho have a romantic encounter.
153	51	"Pancho le confiesa a Susana cómo murió Rebeca"	17 September 2018	2.8
Pancho opens his heart to Susana and confesses how Rebeca died. Julieta and Susana manage to convince Crisanta to withdraw the accusation against Imleda. Linda discovers Clarisa kissing Axel. Daniela accidentally finds Imelda's marriage certificate. Yela confesses to Julieta that Fernando is innocent.
154	52	"El #TeamOsos va con todo al "Reality del amor""	18 September 2018	2.9
Daniela agrees to enter the "Reality del amor", but makes it clear to Gabriel that this does not mean that they are already well as a couple. With the original marriage certificate in her hands, Imelda evicts Crisanta from the building. Susana can not get close to her children. Robert asks Julieta an opportunity for David and Fernando to meet each other. In a physical activation, Susana and Juliet surpass their strength.
155	53	"Fernando sale de la cárcel dispuesto a conocer a David"	19 September 2018	2.9
Fernando is out of prison and threatens Robert that by refusing to let David meet him, he will be willing to do anything to find his son. Blanca suffers a faint caused by a disorder that affects the ear. Imelda claims Amalia for her betrayal. Susana and Juliet have hallucinations. Aristóteles and Temo restart their friendship. Susana reveals her love for Pancho. David learns that his father is already free.
156	54	"Daniela y Gabriel entran al "Reality de amor""	20 September 2018	3.0
The #TeamOsos will be put to the test in the Reality de amor, where they will live completely isolated to demonstrate that they deserve to be united again and they are the best couple in the world. David is about to know the voice of his real father, the reunion is approaching. Julieta is shocked by David's excitement about meeting his dad. Crisanta tries to tempt Amalia again. Julieta wants to prove that Fernando is a good person for David. Polita discovers Audifaz's secret.
157	55	"Temo le confiesa a Pancho que es gay"	21 September 2018	2.8
Temo does not want to suffer anymore, and finally finds a suitable situation to confess to Pancho that he is gay. Julieta and Robert agree to give Fernando the opportunity to meet David. Daniela and Gabriel have a magical night inside the Reality de amor. Audifaz explains to Polita his conversion to Christianity.
158	56	"Blanca secuestra a Julieta"	24 September 2018	2.8
Daniela and Gabriel take advantage of their magical night in the reality show, and rekindle the passion in their marriage. Blanca forces Julieta to accompany her to Mexico City to go in search of Daniela and get her out of the Reality de amor, before she continues exhibiting her intimate life. Blanca leaves Julieta in the middle of the road. Julio does not accept that Temo is different. Robert authorizes the meeting between David and Fernando, but with a condition.
159	57	"Fernando peleará por la custodia de David"	25 September 2018	3.3
David has given a new meaning to the life of Fernando, and is determined to start a trial so that his son can live with him. Blanca arrives at the reality show to take Dani, but instead is confused with the leader of a dangerous band of thieves. Her family is worried about her. Audifaz forbids Aristóteles to remain as Temo's friend when he discovers he is gay, but Aris will defend him and will seek to put a stop to his father's closed mind.
160	58	"Daniela está embarazada"	26 September 2018	3.3
In the Reality de amor, Daniela confirms that she and Gabriel are going to be parents. Aristóteles confesses to his family that he is gay, although he only did it to defend Temo and to teach his family a lesson. Audifaz denies his support to his son and confronts Pancho. Aristóteles decides to go live with Robert and Julieta, without saying he is not gay. The real leader of thieves appears and Blanca is in danger. Julieta does not give David permission to go out with Fernando.
161	59	"Gabriel se decepciona tras saber que no será papá"	27 September 2018	3.1
Gabriel was excited about the idea of becoming a father, but the analysis shows that everything was a false alarm. Fernando starts the trial to fight for David's custody. Blanca is back home, thanks to Robert. Aristóteles reveals that he pretends to be different, in solidarity with Temo. Pancho and Susana are trapped in an elevator. Blanquita says her first word.
162	60	"Julieta y Robert enfrentan un juicio por la custodia de David"	28 September 2018	3.0
Julieta and Robert go to trial to try to prevent David from staying with Fernando, his real father. David is very confused, because he wants to live with his 3 parents. The trial for the heritage of the Córcega also begins. Pancho manages to connect with Rebecca, where she asks him to be happy. Audifaz threatens Robert and Juliet because they protect Aristóteles.
163	61	"Julieta y Robert deben separarse de David"	1 October 2018	3.0
The judge determines that for six months David will live with Fernando, this is a nightmare for Julieta and Robert. Audifaz fulfills his threats and confronts Pancho to keep him out of the building, arguing that his son harms Aristóteles values. Susana points out to Crisanta that she is not interested in the building of the Córcega. Polita is reunited with Aristóteles and externally supports him.
164	62	"Pancho le declara su amor a Susana"	2 October 2018	2.9
Pancho corresponds to Susana's feelings by asking her to start her own love story. The Córcega say goodbye to David. Julieta blames Robert for the loss of David and looks for Fernando to beg him not to separate them. Fernando looks forward to the arrival of his son.
165	63	"Susana peleará por la herencia de Canuto"	3 October 2018	2.8
Imelda gets carried away by the bad thoughts of Audifaz and asks Pancho to leave the apartment, so Susana decides to fight for her rightful inheritance, so that Pancho and his children stay to live in the Córcega building. Dave finally leaves with Fernando. Robert is very affected because his family falls apart.
166	64	"El Team Osos sale del Reality de amor"	4 October 2018	2.7
Daniela can not be more separated from Gabriel and are disqualified from the Reality de amor. Since David left, the life of Julieta and Robert changed completely, he is afraid of losing Julieta forever. Vicente wants to make up for lost time with Susana. Axel and Iker compete to know who is the best for Linda.
167	65	"Polita sale en defensa de Aristóteles"	5 October 2018	2.8
Vicente proposes Robert to be his replacement in Africa. Audifaz confesses that he feels something for another woman. Fernando decides to change David from school, which makes the relationship between Julieta and Robert more complicated. Polita confronts Audifaz to defend Aristóteles preferences. Daniela and Gabriel want to adopt a new member of the family.
168	66	"Robert explota en contra de Julieta"	8 October 2018	3.0
Robert has a personal and marital crisis, he claims to Julieta the sacrifice he made to have the perfect family balance that she wanted, but feels that he has failed. Julieta thinks it hard to rejoin with Robert. David communicates with Robert. Temo asks Aristóteles not to continue with his lie. Polita discovers Audifaz with Aura. David will not change schools. Pancho surprises Susana with a romantic dinner, where he asks her to be his girlfriend.
169	67	"Polita decide divorciarse de Audifaz"	9 October 2018	2.9
Polita is disappointed by the treachery of Audifaz, can not live with a man who despises his own son and after thinking it over, decides to ask for a divorce. Julieta and Robert are in a terrible economic situation and could return to the Córcega building. Crisanta returns to live in the Córcega building. Dave does not know who of his two parents to choose. Dave is reunited with Julieta.
170	68	"Robert acepta irse a África"	10 October 2018	3.2
Robert believes it is time to think about him and his profession before anything else, so he accepts Vicente's proposal to go to Africa. Daniela wants to have a child with Gabriel. Pancho and Robert become confidants. Sebastián expresses his love to Susana. David wants to go back to live with Robert and Julieta.
171	69	"David regresa a casa de Julieta y Robert"	11 October 2018	3.3
Fernando discovers that David is not happy with him and to keep him from suffering, he decides that the best place for David to live is at Robert and Julieta's house and with his broken heart he returns him, returning the life that he took from Julieta. Pancho puts a stop to Julio's rejection of Temo. Crisanta falls in Imelda's joke. Gabriel is unlikely to have children. Pancho and Susana inform Vicente that they are in a relationship.
172	70	"Julieta y Robert aceptan vivir en casa de Blanca"	12 October 2018	3.1
Vicente can not contain himself and kisses Susana, to which she responds with a slap. Robert and Julieta arrive at the Córcega building to live for a while at Blanca's house, but due to the specialness of Julieta, the problems between daughter-in-law and mother-in-law also return. Audifaz ignores Aristóteles. Temo wants to return to Toluca. The Córcega discover Gabriel's reproductive problem. Julieta expresses that she feels unsuccessful to return to live with Blanca.
173	71	"Imelda corre a Julieta de su casa"	15 October 2018	3.2
Doña Imelda makes Temo leave her home, arguing that she is against his sexual preferences. Julieta defends Temo, but Imelda warns her that if she does not agree with her it is better to leave her house. Linda breaks Axel's heart, and decides to only have a family relationship with him. Daniela defends Gabriel from Imelda's intransigence. Audifaz receives from Aura a lesson about respect. David asks Lupita to be his girlfriend.
174	72	"Aris impide que Temo regrese a Toluca"	16 October 2018	3.4
Aristóteles does not want Temo to leave Oaxaca because he is one of the people who matter most to him and does not want to be alone. Temo decides to stay with his family, Aristóteles and Diego, his best friend. Pancho can not hide his jealousy and fights with Vicente.
175	73	"Robert inicia su plan para reconquistar a Julieta"	17 October 2018	3.5
Robert is determined to recover the magnet that joins him to Julieta and sets in motion his plan to return to fall in love with a romantic detail to remember their first date. David loses the lead and Diana cancels the play. Iker causes Doña Blanca to surprise Linda by kissing Axel, to which she reacts in a bad way. Sebastián escapes after knowing that Susana and Pancho are a couple. Daniela and Gabriel lose their dog Hermoso.
176	74	"Susana y Pancho recuperan a Sebastián"	18 October 2018	3.1
Sebastián appears in the hands of kidnappers who call Susana to ask for ransom for him. Pancho accompanies Susana to protect her and manages to recover Sebastián, accompanied by Hermoso. Robert again asks Julieta for marriage. Iker denies his friendship to Linda. Aristóteles and Temo compose their special song. Linda is exhibited by Blanca in front of her entire family, for her forbidden love affair with Axel.
177	75	"Susana renuncia al amor de Pancho"	19 October 2018	3.1
Susana is convinced that her relationship with Pancho will not work because her children will never agree and it is best to think about their happiness even if they have to sacrifice their love. Sebastián goes to live with Vicente. Tavo expresses to Catalina what he feels for her. Sebastián discovers that Hermoso is wanted by his family. Linda and Axel confront their mothers, letting them know that they will fight for their love. Susana asks Julieta for help.
178	76	"Linda y Axel deciden luchar contra el rechazo de su familia"	22 October 2018	3.0
Linda defends her love for Axel and confronts her family to let them know that she will live alone. Doña Imelda remains firm in her position and warns her that if she leaves, she will also lose her business. Julieta advises Susana not to give up love. Sebastián does not want to return Hermoso to his family. Robert keeps his promise with Canuto. Aristóteles asks his father to be the Audifaz he admired. Julio makes a serious joke to Sebastián, which will further affect the relationship between Susana and Pancho.
179	77	"Axel le propone a Linda vivir juntos"	23 October 2018	3.1
Linda moves to Daniela and Gabriel's house while she finds a place to live, Axel reminds her that she counts on him for everything and in the future he would like to share the adventure of living together. Daniela and Gabriel are reunited with Hermoso. The tree of Canuto disappears. The school camp begins. Aristóteles suffers an accident in the camp, caused by Diego. Sebastián is still determined to get revenge against Julio, without imagining the seriousness of the consequences.
180	78	"Julieta está al borde de la muerte"	24 October 2018	3.0
Sebastián's joke gets out of control and in his attempt to take revenge on Julio, he places fireworks in the tent, causing an explosion, where Julio, Temo and Julieta end up in the hospital. Despite Robert's quick reaction, Julieta is about to go into a coma. Sebastián tells Susana that he is to blame for what happened in the camp.
181	79	"Susana se hace responsable por el accidente de Julieta"	25 October 2018	3.0
Robert informs the family that Julieta is in a coma, nobody explains how the accident happened. Susana assumes her responsibility and confesses that Sebastián caused the explosion. Julio regrets rejecting Temo. Sebastián apologizes to David, but he blames him for his mother's condition.
182	80	"Julieta da una esperanza de vida"	26 October 2018	2.9
Robert is devastated to see the love of his life on the verge of death and after remembering the beautiful moments at her side, takes David to the hospital. Julieta reacts thanks to the visit of her son. Susana wants to stay away from Pancho. Vicente proposes to Susana to be together again. Hugo accepts Catalina's relationship with Tavo. Axel asks Linda to live their love away from Oaxaca.
183	81	"Julieta despierta del coma"	29 October 2018	2.9
Robert and David return to the hospital to witness a miracle, Julieta gives signs of life and manages to get out of the coma. Sebastián can not take his fault and tries to take his own life, but Pancho y Susana llegan a tiempo para impedirlo.
184	82	"Los Osos van a ser papás"	30 October 2018	3.3
Gabriel gets excellent results from the fertility treatment and after following the steps, they receive the news that Daniela is expecting a baby. Susana asks Robert to fulfill the promise he made to Canuto. Julieta and Robert reaffirm their marriage vows. Sebastián asks Julieta and David for forgiveness. Robert and Julieta decide to go away to start a new life and be able to give a better life to their children. They say goodbye to their whole family.
185	83	"Polita y Audifaz firman el divorcio"	31 October 2018	3.0
Polita will not allow her children to grow up beside an intolerant man and for their sake, she decides to sign her definitive separation from Audifaz. Sebastián shows a great change in his personality and asks for forgiveness from Julio. Daniela and Gabriel let the Córcega's know that they are going to be parents.
186	84	"Eugenio padece Alzheimer"	1 November 2018	2.7
Eugenio learns that he suffers from Alzheimer's and does not know how to confess this to his family, Pancho is his only support at this moment and asks him to keep the secret. When they hear the heart of their baby, Dr. Tania tells Daniela and Gabriel that they are having triplets.
187	85	"Susana y Pancho tienen una cita romántica"	2 November 2018	2.9
Susana and Pancho have long denied what they feel, so their children plan a romantic date so they can be together again, but before becoming a couple they must pass some tests. Axel demonstrates his fragility of commitment, he wants to have an open relationship, but Linda decides to put an end to their relationship. Aristóteles is angry to know that they edited his interview to make believe that he hates gay people, so Polita helps him, although Temo loses hope to be with him.
188	86	"Diego y Temo ya son novios"	5 November 2018	3.2
Diego takes a risk once more and asks Temo to be his boyfriend, Temo does not think things through and agrees to be his boyfriend. Pancho and Susana are the first to know this news. Massimo meets Crisanta and Imelda, when each one prepares her offering for Canuto on the Day of the Dead. Susana seeks help for Eugenio's illness, while he, with Frida's help, clings to his memories.
189	87	"Guido destruye a "vanidoso" y culpa a Hermoso"	6 November 2018	3.5
Jealousy invades Guido and he breaks vanidoso, the teddy bear that is the symbol of love between Gabriel and Daniela. In order not to raise suspicions, he blames Hermoso for this act. Audifaz returns to break with the calm of his family, informing Aristóteles of the relationship that Temo maintains with Diego. Canuto's ghost visits his family and Susana takes back the promise that the Córcega will be a single happy family. Doña Imelda was about to embitter the feast of catrinas, by offending Susana and Temo.
190	88	"Aris y Diego pelean por Temo"	7 November 2018	3.7
Aristóteles and Diego not only argued, this time they punch each other. By trying to stop them, Temo is wounded. The meeting of the Day of the Dead should be special and enjoyable, however Doña Imelda will try to make everyone think like her even though times have changed. Guido takes advantage of the family distraction to put a substance to the chocolate that everyone drinks. Crisanta feels betrayed because Susana tries to unite the Córcega.
191	89	"¿Daniela perderá a sus bebés?"	8 November 2018	3.1
Daniela suffers severe pain in her stomach and Gabriel must take her to the hospital. There is a risk of abortion. Susana and Pancho ask for Axel's approval to resume their relationship, since they already have the permission of their younger children.
192	90	"Eugenio le confiesa a su familia que padece de Alzheimer"	9 November 2018	3.2
The Córcega family meets at the request of Eugenio and confesses that he suffers from Alzheimer's. He does not want Blanca, Robert and Julieta to know about his illness. Guido exploits knowing that Daniela and Gabriel will not lose their babies. Temo does not feel convinced of his relationship with Diego, while Polita encourages Aristóteles to fight for Temo's love.
193	91	"Susana acepta casarse con Pancho"	12 November 2018	3.1
After a series of tests, Pancho surprises Susana and gives her an engagement ring. She accepts with pleasure and promises that they will be a great family, although Axel still does not agree. Aristóteles cleanses his mind and affirms to know what he wants in life.
194	92	"Temo termina con Diego"	13 November 2018	3.0
Temo wants to be honest with Diego, accepts that he can not correspond to his feelings because he is still in love with Aristóteles, to avoid more suffering, he decides to end their relationship. Guido discovers who is the executor in the testament of his grandfather, so he needs to change it, to become the universal heir. Grecia arrives in Oaxaca ready to help Susana, her best friend, but has a bumpy encounter with Pancho.
195	93	"El amor unió a Aristemo"	14 November 2018	3.3
After having met Temo and almost losing him, Aristóteles declares his love determined to fight against everything for him. ArisTemo demonstrates that love can break all barriers. Pancho surprises Susana with the unexpected appearance of her friend Grecia, who arrives looking to renew herself. Massimo declares his love to Imelda, at the same time that he conquers Crisanta. Daniela and Gabriel discover the sex of their triplets.
196	94	"Massimo nombra a Gabriel como su heredero"	15 November 2018	3.4
Massimo is very proud of Gabriel, believes that for the sake of his triplets, it is he who should inherit all Musi companies, but Guido will not allow it and is willing to do anything to keep the Musi empire. Audifaz is adamantly opposed to Aristóteles being Temo's partner. Guido has Luigi as an accomplice to change Massimo's testament.
197	95	"La despedida de solteros de Pancho y Susana"	16 November 2018	3.1
Susana and Pancho have passed the sufficient tests demonstrating that they are the one for the other. The date of their wedding is confirmed and they enjoy their bachelor and bachelorette party with the whole family. Massimo realizes that Imelda and Crisanta know each other, so he hides from both. Imelda and Tulio threaten Polita with taking custody of Arquímedes if she does not leave the Córcega building.
198	96	"Aris y Temo se meten en problemas con la policía"	19 November 2018	3.7
During their first special date, Aristóteles and Temo are accused by the police of using drugs in the park, they do not know what to do to show that everything is a confusion and that they are innocent. Gabriel asks Guido why the mezcal of his grandfather's business is adulterated. Catalina surprises Imelda and Massimo in a secret romantic dinner, so Imelda asks her not to reveal it to her family.
199	97	"Gabriel enfrenta a Guido"	20 November 2018	3.1
Gabriel discovers that Guido betrayed his grandfather, who is responsible for adulterating the mezcal and plans to stay with Massimo's companies.
200	98	"Gabriel muere después del nacimiento de sus hijos"	21 November 2018	3.8
Daniela and Gabriel witness the birth of their triplets together. The poison that Guido supplied to Gabriel causes his heart to fail. After the birth of the triplets, Gabriel suffers a heart attack and doctors can not save his life. At school, everyone suffers from gastric problems.
201	99	"La familia se une para darle el último adiós a Gabriel"	22 November 2018	3.5
Family and friends give the last goodbye to Gabriel and with them, Daniela says goodbye to the love of his life, promising that his children will honor him for being a unique and unforgettable man. Blanca returns to Oaxaca to give Daniela the strength she needs to move forward with her children. Aristóteles is furious knowing that the Córcega's want to take from Polita the custody of Arquímedes.
202	100	"Massimo hereda sus bienes a los hijos de Gabriel"	23 November 2018	3.4
Massimo does not plan to leave his three great-grandchildren helpless and now that Gabriel is not there, all his companies will be for them. Guido learns of the decision his grandfather made. Robert and Julieta can not be with Daniela, but they write a letter to send her all their support. Julio suspects that Sebastián is responsible for the belching attack at school. Pancho plans with Susana the possibility of living together.
203	101	"Neto es el nuevo gerente de la mezcalería de Massimo"	26 November 2018	3.7
Ernesto is a man who seeks the American dream and is about to achieve it. In the restaurant where he works, they begin to offer Guido's mezcal. Guido announces to Luigi what his next plan will be to keep his Massimo's fortune. Yolo denies her Mexican roots and does not like anything that is Mexican.
204	102	"Neto es deportado de Estados Unidos"	27 November 2018	3.7
Police discover that Neto used false documents and broke the law by hiring illegals in the restaurant, so he is arrested and deported from the United States along with his three children. While Hugo investigates whether Sebastián is responsible for the belching attack, Grecia suffers a new attack after eating an apple.
205	103	"Neto y sus hijos empiezan una nueva vida en México"	28 November 2018	3.4
Yolo does not forgive Neto for having to leave the country where they lived for many years, despite that, they arrive in Mexico determined to start a new life together. Polita informs Blanca and Daniela about Imelda's plans to take Arquímedes away from her. Eugenio reveals who was his first love, that same woman is also Neto's mother.
206	104	"Massimo no quiere ayudar a Neto"	29 November 2018	3.2
Neto returns to the place where he was born, Oaxaca and with the help of Pancho he manages to find Massimo, but he refuses to give him his support. Susana and Pancho try to adapt to their new life.
207	105	"Yolo es la nueva vecina de Aris"	30 November 2018	2.9
Blanca accepts that Neto and his children live on the roof of the Córcega building. Yolo and Aristóteles collide by accident, and despite her anger, Yolo feels an attraction for him. In telling her dad about the incident, Temo begins to feel jealous of Yolo's interest. Neto gets a job as a bouncer at a bar.
208	106	"Temo y Yolo, la pelea por Aris comienza"	3 December 2018	3.4
Pancho gets Neto a place to live in the Córcega building. Doña Imelda accepts that The Rey live on the roof of the building. Temo suspects that Yolo, his new neighbor, is interested in Aristóteles, and makes it clear that he is his boyfriend. Massimo puts a condition on Guido to give him the power of all his business. Susana can not deal with Sebastián and Julio’s problems, so she puts an ultimatum to Pancho.
209	107	"Yolo organiza una fiesta en el edificio Córcega"	4 December 2018	3.4
Yolo breaks the rules of the building by organizing a rooftop party. The Córcega demand order, but Yolo threatens to be worse. On his first day of work, Neto confronts Grecia again and she unintentionally gets him fired, now he must face unemployment again and the problems that Yolo has created in the Córcega building.
210	108	"Doña Imelda le exige a Neto que se vaya del edificio"	5 December 2018	2.9
After breaking the rules of the building, Doña Imelda forbids Neto to live in the apartment on the roof. Yolo accepts that she planned everything to return to the United States. Neto has nowhere to go and is forced to sleep on the street with his children. Daniela discovers that Crisanta is also Massimo’s girlfriend.
211	109	"El destino insiste unir a Grecia y Neto"	6 December 2018	3.2
Neto does not allow his children to sleep in the street, so he decides to go back to look for Pancho and try to recover his work at the bar. Neto agrees to spend the night at Susana's house, what he never imagined is that fate would reunite him with Grecia. Eugenio makes Massimo promise that he will not hurt Imelda. It hurts Aristóteles that Temo does not trust in the love that he has for him. Blanca discovers that Eugenio has Alzheimer's, and is disappointed in her family for having hidden it.
212	110	"Blanca hace una promesa de amor"	7 December 2018	2.9
Eugenio's disease progresses, but Blanca promises that she will help him fight the pain and they will remain together in health and in illness, no matter how painful it may be. Neto opens his heart and tells his story to Grecia, which grows even more interest in her. Susana makes the decision to separate from Pancho, thanks to the problems between Julio and Sebastián. Neto detects that Massimo's mezcal is adulterated and puts it on notice.
213	111	"Yolo besa a Aris, ¿será el fin de ArisTemo?"	10 December 2018	3.6
Yolo persists in conquering Aristóteles, and while he is distracted, she steals a kiss. She warns him that they will see each other more often, because she will return to live in the Córcega building and attend the same school. Daniela's triplets arrive home. Pancho explains to Neto that Susana has returned to her home after the fight between Julio and Sebastián. Imelda confirms to her sons that Yolotl Rey, the woman who separated them as brothers, has returned to their lives.
214	112	"Imelda y Crisanta descubren que comparaten al mismo hombre... ¡otra vez!"	11 December 2018	3.6
Crisanta listens to the romantic conversation that Massimo maintains with Doña Imelda, that is how she discovers that they are once again love rivals. Eugenio confesses to Neto that his mother was his first love, so Blanca explodes against him when listening to him. Temo prepares a revenge for Yolo, which could possibly cause him a big problem with Aristóteles.
215	113	"Eugenio sospecha que Neto es su hijo"	12 December 2018	3.1
Ever since Eugenio knew that Yolotl, his first girlfriend, is Neto's mother, he suspects that Neto is his son. Doña Imelda knows that Eugenio is Neto's father, but she will lie to him to try to hide the past. The children set a trap for Yolo so that Temo can warn her not to get involved in his relationship with Aristóteles.
216	114	"Guido confiesa uno de sus crímines"	13 December 2018	3.0
Yolo and her brothers prepare a revenge against Temo, but in a mistake of time, Guido is the one who suffers the consequences that cause him a nervous breakdown and ends up confessing that he killed his parents. Audifaz believes that Eugenio has to know what the Córcega did to Yolotl.
217	115	"Ernesto Rey podría ser hijo de Audifaz"	14 December 2018	3.2
Doña Imelda accepts that when she learned that Yolotl was pregnant, she forced her to disappear for the sake of her family and now that Neto has come into their lives, Audifaz believes that he could be his son. After the humiliation he has suffered and for revealing his secret in the Córcega building, Guido promises to kill the whole family. Susana and Pancho can not agree to the preparations for their wedding. Guido continues with his plan to conquer Linda, but she only sees him as a friend.
218	116	"Susana y Pancho ya son marido y mujer"	17 December 2018	3.5
After postponing their wedding in solidarity with the Córcega family, Susana and Pancho join their lives in front of God, friends and family, while Susana enters the church on the arm of her children, Blanca is the one who delivers Pancho to the altar. Guido goes to the Córcega building and tries to poison Hermoso. Imelda believes that Robert's disappearance was a punishment for letting Yolotl leave pregnant.
219	117	"Blanca se entera que Eugenio podría ser padre de Neto"	18 December 2018	3.4
Ever since Eugenio mentioned Yolotl and Blanca knew that she was his first love, she does not stop thinking that there is a possibility that Eugenio has more family. Yolo gives Temo and Aristóteles a bad time during Pancho's wedding, and although Temo was affected, he did not fall for provocations so as not to ruin his dad's wedding. Crisanta proposes a truce to Imelda so that together they take revenge on Massimo. Neto discovers the dark secret that Grecia hides.
220	118	"ArisTemo sella su amor con un tatuaje"	19 December 2018	3.3
Temo proposes to Aristóteles to seal their love with a tattoo, the two take the risk to remember their story forever. Linda confronts Imelda for having spread among the family that she has a sexually transmitted disease. Susana and Pancho live their honeymoon to the maximum, but Susana seems to feel embarrassment for some of Pancho's behaviors. Guido is about to be discovered thanks to Neto's children.
221	119	"La Navidad llega al edificio Córcega"	20 December 2018	N/A
The Córcega welcome the Christmas season, while Neto and his children decorate the Christmas tree, the López are happy to share the traditions and celebrate their first new year as a family. Massimo demands an explanation from Guido, after finding poison in his room. Blanca reveals to Imelda that she knows about Yolotl's existence and demands that she tell her if Eugenio has more family.
222	120	"Julieta y Robert mandan un mensaje de Navidad"	21 December 2018	N/A
Julieta and Robert send mysterious letters, where they ask the family to fulfill a very special mission, distribute toys, clothes, blankets and food to the people who need it most. Guido continues his plan to take over the Mussi empire, and will do everything to eliminate Hermoso.
223	121	"Guido secuestra a Hermoso"	24 December 2018	N/A
Guido steals Hermoso and the entire troop joins to find the dog. The Córcega family and the López family are preparing to put the traditional nativity scene.
224	122	"La pastorela de los Córcega"	25 December 2018	N/A
The López and Córcega families have a Christmas play. Accidentally, Aristóteles breaks Polita's nativity scene and will not be able to participate in the best decorated nativity scene contest.
225	123	"Todos los Córcega pasan juntos la Navidad"	26 December 2018	N/A
Pancho helps Mando escape the abuse he suffers from Artemio, his stepfather, and invites him to spend Christmas Eve together. Although some Córcega do not want to be together on these dates, they have no choice but to live together and celebrate Christmas as a family.
226	124	"¿La tropa descubre la fábrica de Santa?"	27 December 2018	N/A
The united troop has a new mission, to prove that Santa Claus exists. With the help of social networks, Aristóteles tries to fulfill Gaby's dream, and although they were victims of a trap, they achieve their goal and she gets a gift.
227	125	"El fantasma de la Navidad aparece en el edificio Córcega"	28 December 2018	N/A
The inhabitants of the Córcega building face the mysterious ghost of Christmas, who appears to leave a special message to each one of the members of this family.
228	126	"Linda está embarazada"	31 December 2018	N/A
On Holy Innocents Day, the Córcega and López families make jokes and pranks among themselves. Linda confesses that she is pregnant with Axel's son, the Rey return to the United States, Imelda and Crisanta become friends. The troop plans to make Pancho believe that he is a millionaire, without knowing that in reality he already is one.
229	127	"ArisTemo busca el regalo perfecto de año nuevo"	1 January 2019	N/A
Temo prevents Aristóteles from pawning his keyboard to buy a New Year's gift, they discover that the best thing is to be together as a couple and they decide to participate in a television contest. Pancho returns the joke to the troop, so they regret it thinking that Pancho has spent his savings on gifts.
230	128	"ArisTemo gana el concurso de canto"	2 January 2019	N/A
Aristóteles and Temo will participate in a contest of composers on national television. But someone has stolen their demo. The united troop helps to recover the demo, thanks to that, the couple wins the contest and they present themselves to sing live. During the dinner to receive 2019, the Córcega family wants the best for the family but the memories make Yolo remain dissatisfied with her life and demands to her father to have the life that her mother always wanted them to have.
231	129	"Yolo y sus hermanos recuerdan el día en que su mamá los abandonó"	3 January 2019	N/A
Yolo remembers how happy she was before and blames Neto for the abandonment of her mother. Neto intends to start a new life, and build memories to heal his heart and that of his children. In Doña Imelda's home, the afternoon becomes gloomy when they remember the past and Daniela realizes that her present is not very far from what her grandmother lived.
232	130	"Yolotol estaba embarazada cuando se fue de Oaxaca"	4 January 2019	3.2
Imelda remembers when Eugenio's life was in danger, receives a great surprise when she reunited with her great friends and also confesses that she knew about Yolotl's pregnancy.
233	131	"Neto descubre que Guido traicionó a Massimo"	7 January 2019	3.5
Neto reviews the documents of the company and discovers a modification where Massimo gives up all the stocks, leaving Guido as the majority owner. Eugenio learns that Yolotl was pregnant at the time of disappearing and that Audifaz can also be the father of that son. Daniela meets Dr. Carlos Rojas.
234	132	"Neto se entera que Eugenio podría ser su padre"	8 January 2019	3.8
Eugenio tells Neto that they could be father and son, but there is another possibility that he is a Córcega, because Yolotl was also in love with Audifaz. Guido blames Luigui for fraud at the mezcalería. Blanca complains to Imelda that she always acts at her convenience and that's why the family falls apart. After Neto exposed Guido's frauds against Massimo, Guido plans to take revenge on Neto where it hurts most.
235	133	"Aris debe elegir entre Temo y su carrera"	9 January 2019	3.6
Rufo advises Aristóteles to keep his relationship with Temo hidden, otherwise his career as a singer will not be successful, and everything will be a sacrifice to help his family. After a disastrous business dinner, Susana will exploit against Pancho questioning whether their relationship was the best idea. Diana proposes to Hugo to return to the school as principal.
236	134	"Pancho se transforma en un hombre de negocios"	10 January 2019	3.9
Pancho does what Susana asked, decides to evolve and compete for the creative vice-presidency of the company, he is willing to show that he is the best man for her. Guido begins to learn secrets with which he could harm Neto and his family. Eugenio and Neto perform a DNA test.
237	135	"Polita pierde la patria potestad de Arquimedes"	11 January 2019	3.3
The judge announces that after reviewing the new evidence on the case of Amapola and custody of Arquimedes, he temporarily gives custody to Audifaz. Grecia opens her heart to Neto, and confesses a terrible secret from the past. Diana reveals to Hugo that she is responsible for the belching attack, for which he was fired from as school principal.
238	136	"Aris y Temo se reconcilian"	14 January 2019	3.5
Temo leaves a letter for Aristóteles, where he reminds him that love solves everything and is there to support him in his problems, but Rufo threatens their relationship by asking Temo to stay away from Aristóteles. After the tragedy of losing her son, Polita will face a new challenge when being sued for not selling her juices. Guido changes the results in Neto's analysis, making him believe that he is part of the Córcega family. Suddenly, Susana can not speak. Blanca exploits against Imelda, for wanting to harm Polita and take her son.
239	137	"Aris le exige a Rufo que respete su relación con Temo"	15 January 2019	3.2
Aristóteles finds out that Rufo asked Temo to stay away from him, threatens to cancel his presentation if he does not ask Temo for forgiveness. Aristóteles is proud of Temo and reminds him that he loves him because he is unique. Neto reveals to his children that they have more family. Susana is fed up with the ways that Pancho has to negotiate, and she makes it clear that she does not want him to be close to her in the workplace. The Córcega welcome Neto and his family, although not in the best way.
240	138	"Yolo pasa la noche con Guido"	16 January 2019	3.4
After fighting with Linda, Yolo tells Guido that she wants to leave Oaxaca and does not intend to return home. Guido accompanies her to a hotel where she asks him not to leave her alone and kisses him. Neto begins to search for Yolo, but everything will be complicated by an unexpected call. Tulio confesses that he bribed the judge in the case of Polita, to benefit Audifaz and Imelda. Polita is arrested, supposedly for making a fraud.
241	139	"Audifaz busca a Pancho para pedirle ayuda"	17 January 2019	3.5
Audifaz tells Pancho that Polita is attested accused of fraud, so he needs money to get her out of jail. Pancho helps Audifaz and they manage to get Polita out. Ariana, Neto's wife, communicates with him because she wants to see her family. After looking for Yolo all night, Neto discovers her leaving a hotel with Guido.
242	140	"Pancho le quita autoridad a Susana en el trabajo"	18 January 2019	3.0
Pancho begins to displace Susana at work and she is disappointed to learn that he did not give her place in front of the investors. Audifaz reconsiders and returns to Polita the custody of Arquímedes, despite the disagreement of Imelda and Tulio. Yolo discovers Neto and Grecia kissing, so she attacks them for feeling like a betrayal towards her mother.
243	141	"Aristemo quiere que su primer beso sea especial"	21 January 2019	3.6
Temo wants his first love kiss to be with Aristóteles and while they talk about how amazing it is to be Aristemo, they are about to kiss. Daniela and Susana suggest they plan a special date. Yolo is against Neto's relationship with Grecia, and asks him to do what he can to find her mother. Pancho decides to cancel the project with the investors to give Susana her place. Eugenio begs Neto for forgiveness, for not having seen him grow up and asks him to let him get to know him so that he can love him.
244	142	"Guido planea destruir a la familia de Neto"	22 January 2019	3.6
Luigi locates Ariana, Guido assures that he will destroy Neto's family for having taken everything he worked from. Massimo decides that Neto will prepare the recipe for the commemorative mezcal. Grecia believes she has left her past behind, but Félix returns to make life impossible for her. Pancho is opposed to Temo and Aristóteles having a romantic date. Neto gives Daniela the gift that Carlos left in secret and feels dismayed to know who her admirer is. Eugenio asks Audifaz not to mention to Neto that he could also be his son.
245	143	"Félix intenta ahogar a Grecia"	23 January 2019	3.6
Félix manages to enter Grecia's home and tries to drown her, Crisanta hears the cry for help, and thanks to her reaction, manages to save Grecia's life. The Córcega family participates in a dynamic of self-improvement to motivate family unity. Grecia calls Neto to tell him that Félix attacked her.
246	144	"Daniela investiga sobre la muerte de Gabriel"	24 January 2019	3.6
Guido steals Gabriel's photo to get rid of it. Daniela tells Carlos that she wants to understand what happened to Gabriel and begins to investigate the strange illness that caused his death. Neto asks Grecia to be his girlfriend.
247	145	"Neto se reencuentra con Ariana"	25 January 2019	3.4
Ariana arrives in Oaxaca ready to see her children, Guido assures her that Yolo will be very happy when she sees her, but before, she decides to meet with Neto. Audifaz still loves Polita and wants to get her back, but the lawyer Eduardo is also in love with her and confesses it. Neto learns that his mother was in love with two Córcega brothers.
248	146	"La cita especial de Aristemo"	28 January 2019	3.6
Axel and the troop convince Linda to accompany them to Aristemo's special date. Guido assures that the time of the troop has arrived and will soon begin his revenge. Neto announces to his children that their mother, Ariana, has returned to their lives. Massimo wants the triplets to be the heirs of everything he has.
249	147	"Guido se venga de Aristemo"	29 January 2019	3.6
Aristóteles and Temo promise to be together all their lives, as a witness to their love, carve the word "Tahí" in a tree. Guido tries to finish off the troop and causes Aristóteles to suffer a terrible accident. Ariana is reunited with her children, who complain for her abandonment.
250	148	"Aris tiene una esperanza de volver a caminar"	30 January 2019	3.7
The accident that Aristóteles suffered is more serious than he imagined and he will have to undergo surgery, otherwise he will not be able to walk or dance again. Carlos can not hide what he feels anymore and declares his love for Daniela, although she makes it clear that she can not correspond to his feelings. Félix threatens Grecia again, but he will realize that she is no longer alone.
251	149	"Aris se prepara para una difícil rehabilitación"	31 January 2019	3.6
After the surgery, it is likely that Aristóteles does not walk well again for months, so he must overcome a new obstacle, but with the help of Temo and his family he will not rest until he stands up. Yolo wants his mother to return to her family, but Neto is opposed to her decision. It has affected Blanca that Eugenio has forgotten the love between them, and that instead he remembers what he felt for Yolotl.
252	150	"Yolo no acepta que Neto sea novio de Grecia"	1 February 2019	3.3
Neto confesses to his children that he is Grecia’s boyfriend, but Yolo does not accept that relationship and threatens to return to the United States with her mother. Because Aristóteles will not be able to walk, Temo helps him to make music from the comfort of his bed.
253	151	"Audifaz y Eduardo se enfrentan por el amor de Polita"	4 February 2019	3.5
Eduardo admits to Audifaz that he is in love with Polita and warns him that they will not give him explanations because she is a free woman. Aristóteles accepts that Polita is given a new opportunity in love. Guido will set a trap for Neto to show that he has not forgotten his ex-wife. Yolo will take advantage of this situation to drive Grecia away. Daniela receives an anonymous message in which indicates that Gabriel's death was not due to natural causes. The hatred in Guido's heart grows more and more and "La flor más bella de Oaxaca" contest will be the ideal moment to destroy Neto's heart.
254	152	"Andy y Santi arruinan "La flor más bella de Oaxaca""	5 February 2019	3.7
Andy and Santi pose as girls to compete in "La flor más bella de Oaxaca", when one of them wins, they are discovered, the event is ruined and they must name another winner. Eugenio confuses Blanca with Yolotl, as part of his memory loss. Ariana confronts Grecia for the love of Neto. Daniela receives another message about Gabriel's death. During the contest, Guido reveals that Eugenio and Neto have no family relationship.
255	153	"Neto y Eugenio confirman que no son familia"	6 February 2019	3.6
After what happened in the contest, Neto and Eugenio again take DNA tests where they discover that they are not father and son. Susana suggests to Pancho that he no longer work with her for the sake of their relationship.
256	154	"Carlos sospecha que Gabriel fue envenenado"	7 February 2019	3.6
Carlos reviews the symptoms that Gabriel had before dying and discovers that there is a relation with the death of Guido's parents, who died of chronic poisoning. Yolo asks Frida to "borrow" money from her grandparents to give to Ariana.
257	155	"Neto descubre que Yolo es novia de Guido"	8 February 2019	3.6
Neto finds Yolo and Guido kissing, they accept that they have been seeing each other secretly for several months because they are in love. Neto forbids Yolo to continue seeing Guido. Luigi is willing to tell the truth about Gabriel's death.
258	156	"Daniela se entera que Gabriel fue envenenado"	11 February 2019	3.3
Daniela and Massimo hand over the money that is asked for, in exchange, they receive another anonymous letter where it’s confirmed that Gabriel died because someone poisoned him. Yolo agrees to an escape plan with Guido, after learning that her mother will abandon her again. While Guido, wants to disappear before Daniela knows the truth. Frida reveals to Blanca that she and Yolo took the money from her savings box.
259	157	"Neto quiere impedir que Yolo escape con Guido"	12 February 2019	3.8
Neto discovers that Yolo is trying to escape from Oaxaca and Guido is with her, Yolo does not want to make her dad suffer and tells him where she is. Luigi sends the evidence of Guido's crimes to Daniela and she tells the painful truth to Massimo. Daniela asks Neto not to let Guido escape.
260	158	"Daniela logra vengar la muerte de Gabriel"	13 February 2019	4.2
Daniela prevents Guido from escaping and tries to choke him. Guido is taken to prison for the murder of Gabriel and for attempted murder against Daniela. Carlos reveals to Blanca that he is in love with Daniela. Luigi continues uncovering the truth and alerts the Córcega about Guido's attacks.
261	159	"¿Imelda es otra víctima de Guido?"	14 February 2019	3.7
Guido accepts that he killed Gabriel, he also wanted to end Daniela's life, and promises to kill everyone. Despite being arrested, Guido had already prepared another attack against the Córcega. Doña Imelda breathes the poison that Guido put in the humidifier of Daniela's babies.
262	160	"Los Oppas se reencuentran con la familia"	15 February 2019	3.9
Julieta, Robert and their children return to Oaxaca with great news, Julieta is pregnant. Temo prepares a surprise in the park to celebrate Aristóteles’ birthday. Yolo confronts Guido and mentions that he is the biggest disappointment she has had in life. After her encounter with death, Doña Imelda reconsiders and asks for an apology to Aristóteles and Temo for making their lives impossible and is committed to supporting them.
263	161	"¿Robert siente celos de Neto?"	18 February 2019	3.8
Robert meets Neto in the sauna and Eugenio presents him as his almost brother. Robert thanks Neto for his support but makes it very clear that he is uncomfortable with his presence. Julieta finds out that Pancho has occupied the position she had when she left. Doña Imelda apologizes to Polita even though she no longer wants to save her marriage with Audifaz.
264	162	"Julieta se enfrenta con Pancho por la vicepresidencia"	19 February 2019	3.8
Julieta wants to regain her position, she is sure that she is a better vice president and agrees to compete with Pancho. Imelda asks Audifaz to approach his family and be reconciled with them. The first hearing is held in the trial that Daniela faces against Guido. Several witnesses came to give statements, but the unexpected arrest of Luigi could sink Guido further.
265	163	"Guido pasará el resto de su vida en la cárcel"	20 February 2019	4.2
During the trial Luigi reveals that Guido is guilty of all the crimes that he is accused of and also caused the death of his parents, so he is sentenced to 85 years in prison. Aristóteles and Temo announce to Robert and Julieta their desire to marry, but they are discriminated against in the restaurant. After supporting Daniela in the trial against Guido, Carlos decides to take the next step and confesses that he loves her more than before.
266	164	"Massimo le propone matrimonio a Doña Imelda"	21 February 2019	4.1
Doña Imelda announces that she and Massimo are to marry and together live out their lives, Blanca tells the family that she is going to renew her marriage vows with Eugenio. Audifaz is determined to change Aristóteles' feelings towards Temo and hires a girl to be intimate with him. Eugenio's disease gets worse and he forgets basic things. Susana announces who will be left with the creative vice-presidency position.
267	165	"Aris y Temo deben separarse"	22 February 2019	4.0
Temo decides to go to Mexico City to study, but before separating from Aristóteles and his family, they live their last dance planned by the united troop. Imelda finds Linda doing business with Crisanta and takes it as a betrayal. Robert operates David from his scar. Guido receives an offer to regain his freedom.
268	166	"El primer beso de Aristemo"	24 February 2019	3.9
269	167	"El amor y la familia nunca terminan"	24 February 2019	3.9
Aristóteles and Temo have their last dance before separating, convinced of the great love that unites them, they decide to have their first kiss. The Córcega family goes to Huatulco, where Doña Imelda and Massimo get married. After great moments on the beach, Aristóteles will not let Temo go alone, he decides to start his career in Mexico City and live out their lives as a couple. Imelda and Crisanta recognize the great woman in front of them, both agree that they deserve to be loved and enjoy life, they decide to try to be friends. Carlos wants to accompany Daniela in the most important moments of her children, she accepts to give him an opportunity. Audifaz is sorry for treating his family badly, he knows he does not deserve their forgiveness and admits that he is proud of Aristóteles. Guido has a hope of escaping from prison but it was all a plan to start paying his sentence. With an emotional ceremony, Blanca remembers her love story with Eugenio, they confirm that they will always be together. Julieta and Robert have a new goal, a family love that lasts a lifetime.
