= El corazón nunca se equivoca =

- Written by: Pablo Ferrer; Santiago Pineda
- Directed by: Aurelio Ávila; Alicia Carvajal
- Starring: Leticia Calderón; Sergio Sendel; Laura Flores; Víctor González; Helena Rojo; Gabriela Platas; Nuria Bages; Ale Müller; Laura Vignatti; Nikolás Caballero; Eduardo Barquin; Santiago Zenteno; Sian Chiong; Emiliano Vázquez; Alisson Coronado; Bruno Santamaría; Arath de la Torre; Emilio Osorio; Joaquín Bondoni
- Theme music composer: J. Eduardo Murguía; Mauricio L. Arriaga; Ricardo Larrea
- Opening theme: "El corazón nunca se equivoca"
- Country of origin: Mexico
- Original language: Spanish
- No. of seasons: 1
- No. of episodes: 26

Production
- Executive producer: Juan Osorio
- Producer: Ignacio Ortíz Castillo
- Production locations: Mexico City, Mexico; Oaxaca City, Oaxaca, Mexico
- Camera setup: Multi-camera
- Production company: Televisa

Original release
- Network: Las Estrellas
- Release: 23 June – 26 July 2019

Related
- Mi marido tiene familia

El corazón nunca se equivoca (English: The Heart is Never Wrong; shown onscreen as Juntos el corazón nunca se equivoca) is a Mexican television series produced by Juan Osorio for Televisa that premiered on Las Estrellas on 23 June 2019 and ended on 26 July 2019. The series stars Emilio Osorio and Joaquín Bondoni. It is a spin-off of the telenovela Mi marido tiene familia.

The series centers around the love story between Aristóteles and Temo, who leave Oaxaca to start a new life together in Mexico City.

== Premise ==
Aristóteles and Temo move to Mexico City to begin their university studies. Aristóteles is ready to start his music career and communication studies, and make time to be an influencer and have a relationship. Temo wants to be a politician despite the prejudices he may face. Their love will be tested when they make new friends and overcome the challenges in Mexican society for homosexuals.

== Cast ==
- Leticia Calderón as Elsa Reynoso, a teacher at the university and works as an advisor in the campaign of Ubaldo Ortega. She is separated from her husband Olegario Cervantes and is the mother of Andrés, who is deceased, and Carlota, with whom she has a bad relationship.
- Sergio Sendel as Ubaldo Ortega, is campaigning to be head of government of Mexico City. He is Soledad's husband and father of Diego. He is willing to do anything to achieve his goals, being an expert in appearances and manipulation of other people.
- Laura Flores as Soledad Elizalde, a woman submissive and self-sacrificing to the wishes of her husband, Ubaldo Ortega. She is a sculptor and has dedicated most of her life to her home. She is Diego's mother.
- Víctor González as Olegario Cervantes, he considers himself a revolutionary and liberal person. He is father of Andrés and Carlota and has separated from his wife Elsa. Olegario feels invaded by the guilt of having left his family and is willing to regain them.
- Helena Rojo as Dora Ortega, has a strong and controlling character, who has taken on the task of taking care of her sister Nora. Dora thinks it was because of her that her family collapsed. Dora administers the condominium where Polita, Aristóteles and Cuauhtémoc will live.
- Gabriela Platas as Amapola "Polita" Casteñeda, mother of Aristóteles. She is currently ready to live a new adventure with her boyfriend Eduardo as a professional woman in a world dominated by men.
- Nuria Bages as Nora Ortega, administers with her sister Dora a condominium in the Roma neighborhood, owned by her brother Ubaldo. She is a woman of good feelings, although most of these are kept hidden due to the strong and controlling nature of her sister Dora.
- Ale Müller as Carlota Cervantes, she is studying a career in communication. Carlota suffered a lot with the suicide of her brother Andrés and thinks that Elsa, her mother, is the main culprit, although she is sure that Ubaldo Ortega had something to do with it.
- Laura Vignatti as Daniela Córcega
- Nikolás Caballero as Diego Ortega, son of Ubaldo Ortega and Soledad Elizalde. He decided to get away from everything his parents had planned for him because he did not want to pursue a political career and decided to focus instead on the world of entertainment.
- Eduardo Barquin as Mateo, he is studying a degree in political science at one of the most prestigious universities in Mexico City. He is Jewish and has always believed that his socioeconomic status makes him different from other people.
- Santiago Zenteno as Eduardo
- Sian Chiong as Thiago
- Emiliano Vázquez as Julio López Treviño
- Alisson Coronado as Ana Lupe "Lupita" López Treviño
- Bruno Santamaría as Andrés Cervantes
- Arath de la Torre as Francisco "Pancho" López, a peculiar, modern man with a special sense of seeing life. He is Temo's father.
- Emilio Osorio as Aristóteles Córcega, he is ready to start his career in the music and university world in Mexico City to study a degree in communication with his boyfriend Cuauhtémoc López. He has positioned himself as an influencer on social media.
- Joaquín Bondoni as Cuauhtémoc "Temo" López, he wants to be a politician and study in Mexico City. In spite of being a homosexual man in a political world that tends to value heteronormativity, he can achieve what he proposes.
- Silvia Pinal as Imelda Sierra de Córcega

== Production ==
After the completion of Mi marido tiene familia, Juan Osorio announced that he would produce a spin-off with the characters Aristóteles and Temo as protagonists. Filming of the series began on 6 April 2019. The series will consist of 20 episodes. On 7 May 2019, Univision revealed through its upfront for the 2019-20 television season that the series title would be El corazón nunca se equivoca.

== Ratings ==
Viewership and ratings per season of El corazón nunca se equivoca
Season	Episodes	First aired		Last aired		Avg. viewers (millions)
Season	Episodes	Date	Viewers (millions)	Date	Viewers (millions)	Avg. viewers (millions)
1	26	23 June 2019	1.6	26 July 2019	2.9	2.43

== Episodes ==
No.	Title	Original release date	Viewers (millions)
1	"Cambio de planes"	23 June 2019 (Note: Premiered early online through Las Estrellas website on 21 June 2019.)	1.6
Aristóteles and Temo are happy to go to live together in Mexico City but they discover that they will have roommates, Diego and Carlota. Olegario and Elsa commemorate the second mournful anniversary of their son Andrés.
2	"Nuestro secreto"	24 June 2019	2.6
Aristóteles discovers Carlota kissing Ubaldo. Carlota confesses that her motives are very strong, since she thinks Ubaldo was involved with the death of her brother. Temo and Aristóteles attend their first day of classes.
3	"La misión"	25 June 2019	2.6
Ubaldo instructs Mateo to destroy the relationship of Aristóteles and Temo so that Diego has a free path with Temo, since he is still in love with him. Olegario asks Elsa and Carlota for an opportunity to recover their family.
4	"¿Qué festejamos?"	26 June 2019	2.3
Diego organizes a party in the apartment, but it gets out of control. Mateo provokes Aristóteles and they hit each other and everything ends with a lawsuit against Aristóteles. Elsa gives Olegario a sharp answer to his request.
5	"El día que todo cambió"	27 June 2019	2.6
Aristóteles feels jealous after seeing a picture of Diego and Temo together. Thiago meets Carlota, who catches his attention from the first moment. When trying to help her, they both suffer a strong electric shock. Dora asks Ubaldo to help her find her son. Polita will study at the same university as Aristóteles and Temo.
6	"Pide un deseo"	28 June 2019	2.6
Temo’s birthday was the perfect excuse to know what the people around him most want. In spite of her character and the bad ways of taking her relation with Carlota, Elsa wants to recover her love and be a family again. Ubaldo begins his plan to separate Temo from Aristóteles. He does this by making him believe that he has all his confidence in order to manipulate him.
7	"La serenata"	1 July 2019	2.4
Temo will dedicate a song to Aristóteles as a sign of his love. Polita lives one of the happiest moments of her life. She leaves behind the suffering in Oaxaca and will start a new marriage with Eduardo. Elsa points out to Olegario that with what he has done, he has lost the second opportunity he had requested.
8	"Amigos y rivales"	2 July 2019	2.2
Temo explains to Aristóteles how was the relationship he had with Diego. Ubaldo and Olegario face each other. Mateo insists on separating Aristóteles and Temo to gain the confidence of Ubaldo, but this time Diego confronts him to defend his friends. For defending them, Mateo points out to Diego that his father is ashamed of him and that he only pretends to accept him to gain votes. Dora questions Soledad where she has gone alone, without her husband.
9	"La amargada"	3 July 2019	2.5
Carlota despises Thiago without knowing that the influencer's fan club will attack her. Ubaldo suspects that Soledad is cheating on him, threatens her and makes it clear what he could do so if he loses his campaign. Dora finds Nora nostalgic with a photo.
10	"Desaparecido"	4 July 2019	2.4
Aristóteles, Diego and Arquímedes go to the market, but Aristóteles gets carried away by the emotion of meeting his fans, neglects his brother for a moment and gets lost. Ubaldo starts a campaign against Olegario.
11	"Suspiro en el tiempo"	5 July 2019	1.9
Temo prepares a great surprise for Aristóteles, to remind him how much he loves him and that he will always support him in his most difficult moments. Elsa confronts Ubaldo for accusing Olegario without proof. Polita’s soul leaves her body.
12	"Estoy contigo"	8 July 2019	2.8
Aristóteles is devastated by the death of Polita. Soledad realizes that Ubaldo is looking for Carlota by phone.
13	"Ser papás"	9 July 2019	2.5
The López family, friends, and Audifaz, give Polita the last goodbye. Aristóteles and Temo question the possibility of becoming Arqui's parents. Ubaldo learns that Carlota has him in her sights and that she only uses him to get to the truth about Andres' death.
14	"Al descubierto"	10 July 2019	2.6
Now that Ubaldo discovered Carlota's true intentions, he will make her and her entire family pay. Diego asks Temo to help him close his cycle with him so he can be happy. Ubaldo accuses Elsa of being corrupt and a traitor to cover up his fraud. Carlota finds a video in which Andrés accuses Ubaldo of being capable of the worst.
15	"La decepción"	11 July 2019	2.5
Elsa is fired from the campaign and suspended from the university for the accusations received. Nora receives a new message from her secret love of the past, in which they make an appointment in the place where their romance began. Carlota rejects Thiago, despite the fact that with the help of his fan club and Olegario he prepared her a great surprise. With her dismissal, Elsa assures that Ubaldo and she are now enemies.
16	"Sin retorno"	12 July 2019	2.7
Ubaldo hits Soledad after finding out about her relationship with Professor Collins. Nora meets her love from the past. Olegario discovers the relationship that Carlota had with Ubaldo, reason why they finish in a brutal fight.
17	"La luz del mundo"	15 July 2019	2.4
Thiago offers Aristóteles to go with him on tour to become famous. Ubaldo is disappointed in Mateo's work and makes it clear that with a single error, he would be out of his plans. Temo points out to Ubaldo that he can no longer trust him, after learning that he betrayed his family with Carlota. Elsa and Carlota are reconciled. Soledad asks Ubaldo for a divorce.
18	"Otra realidad"	16 July 2019	2.4
Mateo shoots Aristóteles and Carlota and their souls go to a world where they will meet with Andrés. Olegario tells Carlota's secret to Elsa. Ubaldo wins the elections and will become the new head of government of the capital.
19	"De vuelta a casa"	17 July 2019	2.4
Aristóteles wakes up thanks to Temo's song and Ubaldo fears that he will be linked to the attack. Pancho announces that he will go live with Aristóteles and Temo. Ubaldo demands Mateo to reveal the motives for having attempted against Carlota and Aristóteles.
20	"La confesión"	18 July 2019	2.3
Carlota tells Diego the whole truth about her relationship with Ubaldo, but Diego rejects her and accuses Aristóteles and Temo of betrayal. Pancho gives his truck to Aristóteles and Temo so they can get extra resources.
21	"Verdadero amor"	19 July 2019	2.5
Nora and B. meet in the park and kiss, not realizing that Aristóteles and Temo is witness to their love. Diego does not intend to hide the truth from his mother and confesses that Ubaldo had a secret relationship with Carlota. Soledad is armed with courage and leaves her home to start a new life.
22	"El golpe más doloroso"	22 July 2019	2.5
Temo asks Diego to hit him for betraying him. Ubaldo wants to clear his image after Diego's statements, humiliating Carlota in front of the society and declaring war against her family.
23	"Abrir los ojos"	23 July 2019	2.5
Temo confronts Ubaldo, but he threatens him. Elsa and Olegario reveal to Soledad, Dora and Nora, the reasons why Carlota was in a relationship with Ubaldo. After knowing the real reasons, Soledad looks for Carlota to speak face to face and give her support. Dora prevents Nora and B. from seeing each other, but Nora finally puts a stop to her sister.
24	"Amor incondicional"	24 July 2019	2.3
Aristóteles finally reunites with Polita and tells her how much he misses her. Soledad and Collins kiss, but she confesses who her true love is. Olegario learns that Andrés was investigating Ubaldo, before his death. Aristóteles, Temo, Carlota and Diego ask Pancho to collect the evidence of Ubaldo's crimes.
25	"Los ojos del corazón"	25 July 2019	2.6
Dora is armed with courage and confesses to her son who she really is. Ubaldo discovers the plan that Pancho has against him, so he will also call him a traitor. Olegario submits Ubaldo and demands that he confess his crime against Andrés.
26	"Sueño de amor"	26 July 2019	2.9
Ubaldo paid for all the damage he did. Love makes Dora reconsider and apologizes to her sister Nora and accepts her relationship with B. All the dreams of the family are fulfilled and Aristóteles and Temo receive an incredible and shocking surprise.

== Awards and nominations ==
Year	Award	Category	Nominated	Result
2020	GLAAD Media Award	Outstanding Scripted Television Series (Spanish-Language)	El corazón nunca se equivoca	Won
2020	TVyNovelas Awards	Best Antagonist Actor	Sergio Sendel	Nominated
2020	TVyNovelas Awards: Los Favoritos del Público	The Most Beautiful Woman	Ale Müller	Won
2020	TVyNovelas Awards: Los Favoritos del Público	The Most Handsome Villain	Sergio Sendel	Won
2020	TVyNovelas Awards: Los Favoritos del Público	The Most Handsome Senior	Sergio Sendel	Nominated
2020	TVyNovelas Awards: Los Favoritos del Público	Favorite Couple	Emilio Osorio and Joaquín Bondoni	Won
2020	TVyNovelas Awards: Los Favoritos del Público	The Most Delicious Kiss	Emilio Osorio and Joaquín Bondoni	Won
2020	TVyNovelas Awards: Los Favoritos del Público	Slap of the Year	Sergio Sendel and Laura Flores	Won
2020	TVyNovelas Awards: Los Favoritos del Público	Best Finale	Juan Osorio	Won
2020	TVyNovelas Awards: Los Favoritos del Público	Best Cast	Juan Osorio	Won
