= Daniel Arenas =

Colombian and Mexican actor

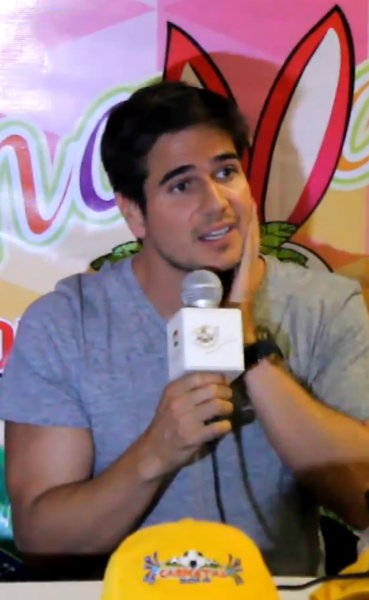
- Born: Daniel Arenas Consuegra; March 30, 1979 (age 47); Bucaramanga, Santander, Colombia
- Citizenship: Colombia; Mexico
- Occupation: Actor
- Years active: 2002–present

Daniel Arenas Consuegra (born March 30, 1979) is a Colombian-Mexican actor. He became known for participating in the reality show Protagonistas De Nuestra Tele in 2002 and becoming the finalist. He has worked on both Colombian television and Mexican television. As of January 2023 he became a co-host of daytime news variety show Hoy Día for Telemundo.

== Early life ==
Arenas was born on March 30, 1979, in Bucaramanga, Santander, Colombia. He is the youngest of six children. He studied acting in the United States.

== Career ==
Arenas's television debut was in Francisco el Matemático. In 2005, he participated in the telenovela Los Reyes, playing Santiago Iriarte, a performance that earned him a nomination for the India Catalina Awards in the category of Best Actor. In 2008, he participated in the telenovela La sucursal del cielo, playing Samuel Lizcano, a pilot of the Air Force.

In 2010 he obtained Mexican citizenship and moved to Mexico City to debut in Televisa was in Teresa, marking his first telenovela in Mexico. He has also worked in Amorcito Corazón, produced by Lucero Suárez, with Elizabeth Álvarez, Diego Olivera and Africa Zavala. In 2012, Arenas made his debut in theater, with "Hercules the Musical", where he played Hercules, the hero of Greek mythology, alongside Violeta Isfel and Miguel Pizarro. In 2013, he starred as protagonist in the telenovela Corazón Indomable, a remake of Marimar, produced by Nathalie Lartilleux, where he worked with Ana Brenda Contreras.

Arenas once again worked with Nathalie Lartilleux in the 2014 telenovela La Gata with Maite Perroni, Erika Buenfil, and Laura Zapata.

Arenas served as a judge in the 10th season of Nuestra Belleza Latina.

== Filmography ==
Television roles
| Year | Title | Role | Notes |
|---|---|---|---|
| 2003–2004 | Francisco el matemático | Hans Hakerman | |
| 2003 | Un ángel llamado Azul | Jeremías Luna | |
| 2005 | Los Reyes | Santiago "Santi" Iriarte | |
| 2007 | Nuevo rico, nuevo pobre | Erwin Alfonso | |
| 2008 | La sucursal del cielo | Samuel Lizacano | |
| 2010 | Doña Bella | Nicolás Ayala | Series regular; 97 episodes |
| 2010–2011 | Teresa | Fernando Moreno Guijarro | Series regular; 108 episodes |
| 2011–2012 | Amorcito corazón | William "Willy" Guillermo Pinzón Hernández | Main role; 206 episodes |
| 2013 | Wild at Heart | Octavio Narváez | Main role; 161 episodes |
| 2014 | The Stray Cat | Pablo Martínez Negrete | Main role; 120 episodes |
| 2016–2017 | Despertar contigo | Pablo Herminio Leal Bueno | Main role; 122 episodes |
| 2017–2019 | Mi marido tiene familia | Juan Pablo Córcega / Robert Cooper | Main role (seasons 1–2); 267 episodes |
| 2019–2020 | Médicos, línea de vida | David Paredes | Main role |
| 2021-2022 | S.O.S me estoy enamorando | Alberto Muñoz Cano | Main role |
| 2023-2024 | Hoy Día | Co-host | |
| 2026 | Guardián de mi vida | Franco Gallardo Toro | |

== Awards and nominations ==
=== Premios TVyNovelas ===
| Year | Category | Telenovela | Result |
|---|---|---|---|
| 2014 | Best Lead Actor | Corazón Indomable | Nominated |
| 2014 | El Mas Guapo | Corazón Indomable | Won |
| 2015 | Best Lead Actor | La Gata | Nominated |
| 2018 | Best Lead Actor | Mi Marido Tiene Famillia | Nominated |
| 2019 | Best Lead Actor | Mi Marido Tiene Más Famillia | Nominated |

=== People en Español ===
| Year | Category | Telenovela | Result |
|---|---|---|---|
| 2013 | Best Actor | Corazón Indomable | Nominated |
| 2013 | Best Couple with Ana Brenda Contreras | Corazón Indomable | Nominated |

=== Premios Juventud ===
| Year | Category | Telenovela | Result |
|---|---|---|---|
| 2014 | ¡Está Buenísimo! | Corazón Indomable | Nominated |
| 2015 | Mi Protagonista Favorito | La Gata | Nominated |

=== Premios India Catalina ===
| Year | Category | Telenovela | Result |
|---|---|---|---|
| 2006 | Best Co-star Actor | Los Reyes | Nominated |

== Personal life ==
As of 2021, Arenas is dating former Miss Colombia Daniella Álvarez.
