= Elizabeth Álvarez =

Mexican telenovela actress (born 1978)

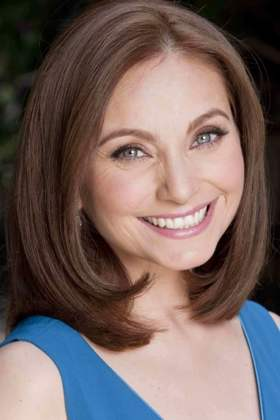
- Elizabeth Álvarez in May 2021
- Born: 30 August 1977 (age 49); Ciudad Juárez, Chihuahua, Mexico
- Occupation: Actress
- Years active: 2000–present

Elizabeth Álvarez Ronquillo (born 30 August 1977) is a Mexican telenovela actress.

== Career ==
Elizabeth Álvarez was chosen to be on the third edition of Big Brother VIP but was voted off in 2004. She studied at the Televisa's Centro de Educación Artística (CEA - Center of Artistic Education).

== Filmography ==
Year	Title	Role	Notes
2000	Mi Destino Eres Tú		Guest star
2001	Amigas y rivales	Rocío	Recurring role
2001-02	Navidad sin fin	Yolanda	Mini-series
2002-03	Las Vias del Amor	Sonia "Francis" Vásquez Solís	Recurring role
2003	Mujer, casos de la vida real		Various episodes
2003-04	Velo de novia	Dulce María Salazar	Recurring role
2004	La Vulka	Lola	Film
2005	Sueños y Caramelos	Rocío de los Santos	Recurring role
2005	Contra Viento y Marea	Minerva de Lizárraga	Recurring role
2006-07	La Fea Más Bella	Marcia Villaroel	Main cast
2007	Liliana	Liliana	Film
2008	Fuego En La Sangre	Ximena Elizondo Acevedo de Reyes	Main role
2009	Sortilegio	Irene	Guest star
2011-12	Amorcito Corazon	Isabel Cordero Valencia de Lobo	Main role
2013	Corazón Indomable	Lucía Narváez	Main cast
2017	El vuelo de la victoria	Magdalena Sanchez	Main cast
2022	La herencia	Deborah Portillo	Main cast
2023	Nadie como tú	Begoña Toledano Maciel	Main cast

== Awards and nominations ==
=== TVyNovelas Awards ===
Year	Category	Telenovela	Result
2007	Best Co-star Actress	La fea más bella	Won

=== Kids Choice Awards México ===
Year	Category	Telenovela	Result
2006	Favorite Televisión Villain	Sueños y Caramelos	Nominated
2006	Revelation of Year	Sueños y Caramelos	Won

=== Premios El Heraldo de México ===
Year	Category	Telenovela	Result
2003	Best Actress Debut	Las vías del amor	Won
