= 27th TVyNovelas Awards =

2009 Mexican TV awards

- Date: March 15, 2009
- Location: Forum Mundo Imperial, Acapulco, Guerrero
- Hosted by: Yuri

Highlights
- Most awards: Alma de hierro (8)
- Most nominations: Alma de hierro (12)

Television/radio coverage
- Network: Canal de las Estrellas

The 27th TVyNovelas Awards were an academy of special awards to the best soap operas and TV shows. The awards ceremony took place on March 15, 2009 in the Mundo Imperial Forum, Acapulco, Guerrero. The ceremony was televised in Mexico by Canal de las Estrellas.

Yuri hosted the show. Alma de hierro won 8 awards, the most for the evening. Other winners Fuego en la sangre won 4 awards, including Best Telenovela, and Cuidado con el ángel and Las tontas no van al cielo won 2 awards each.

== Summary of awards and nominations ==
Telenovela	Nominations	Awards
Alma de hierro	12	8
Fuego en la sangre	11	4
Al diablo con los guapos	7	0
Cuidado con el ángel	5	2
Las tontas no van al cielo	5	2
Palabra de mujer	4	0
Juro que te amo	3	0
Tormenta en el paraíso	3	0
Querida enemiga	2	0

== Winners and nominees ==
=== Telenovelas ===
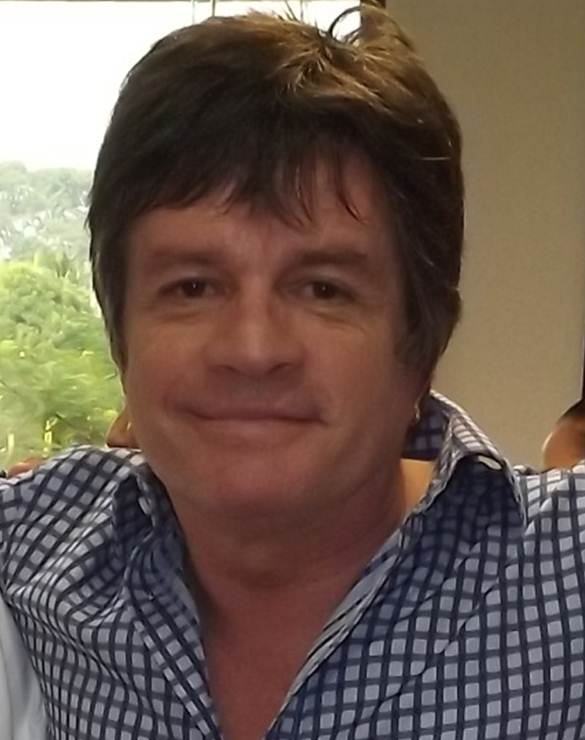
Alejandro Camacho, winner for Best Actor.

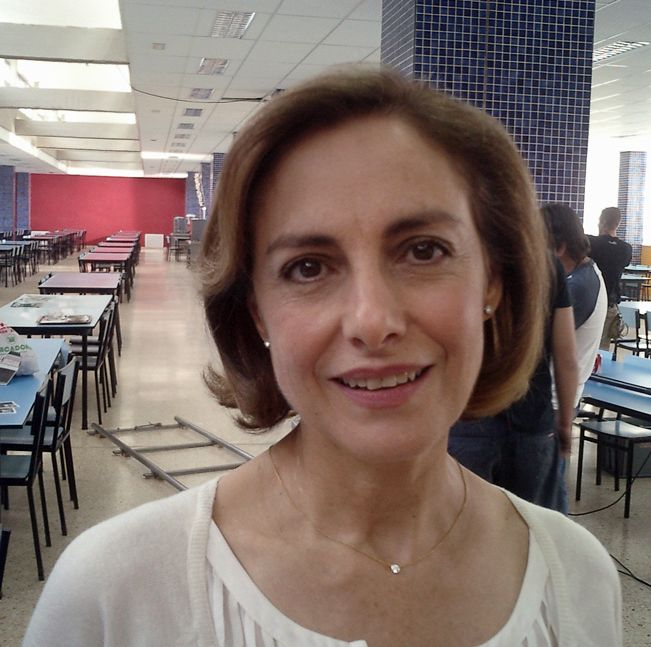
Diana Bracho, winner for Best Antagonist Actress.

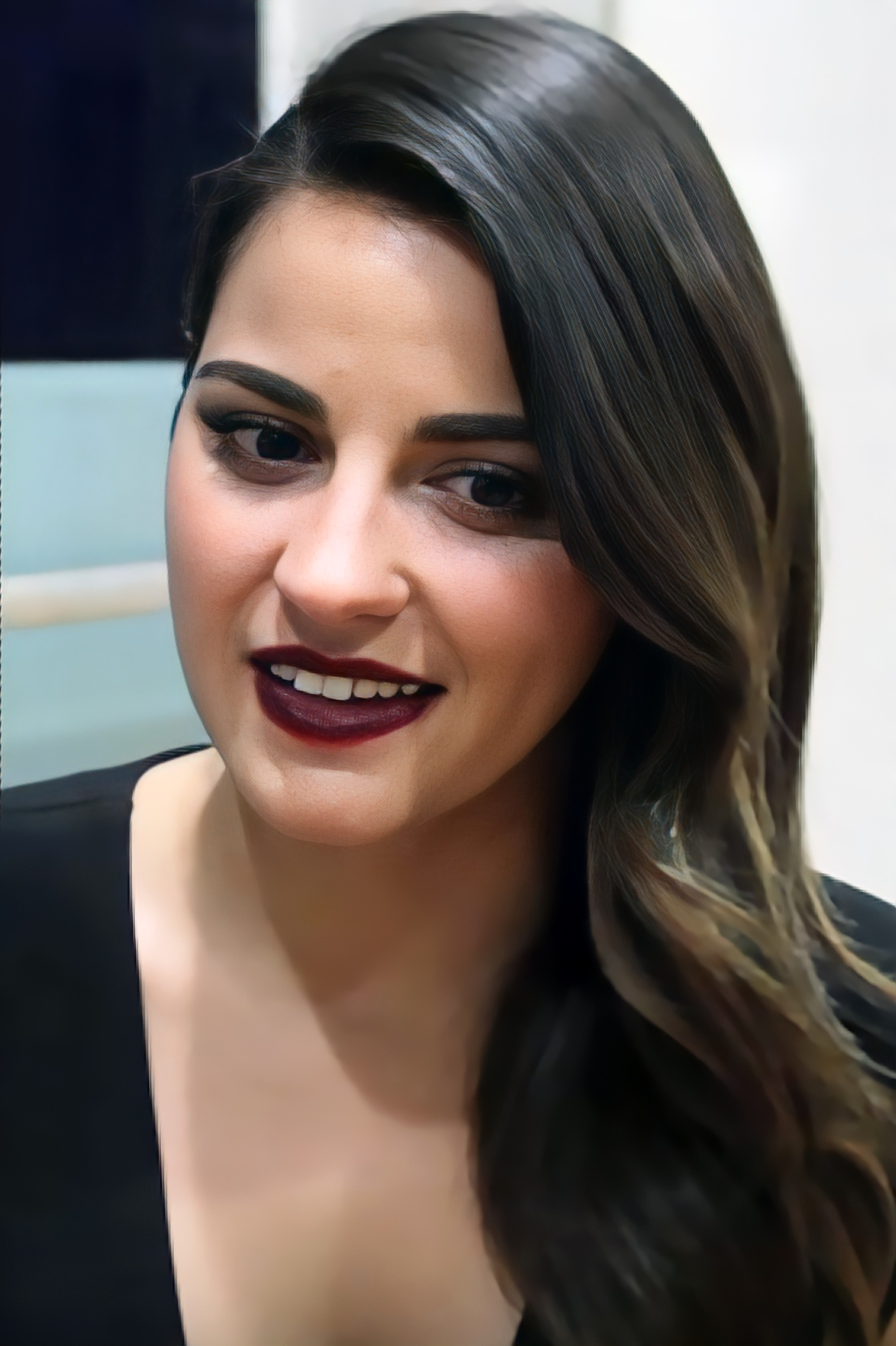
Maite Perroni, winner for Best Young Lead Actress.

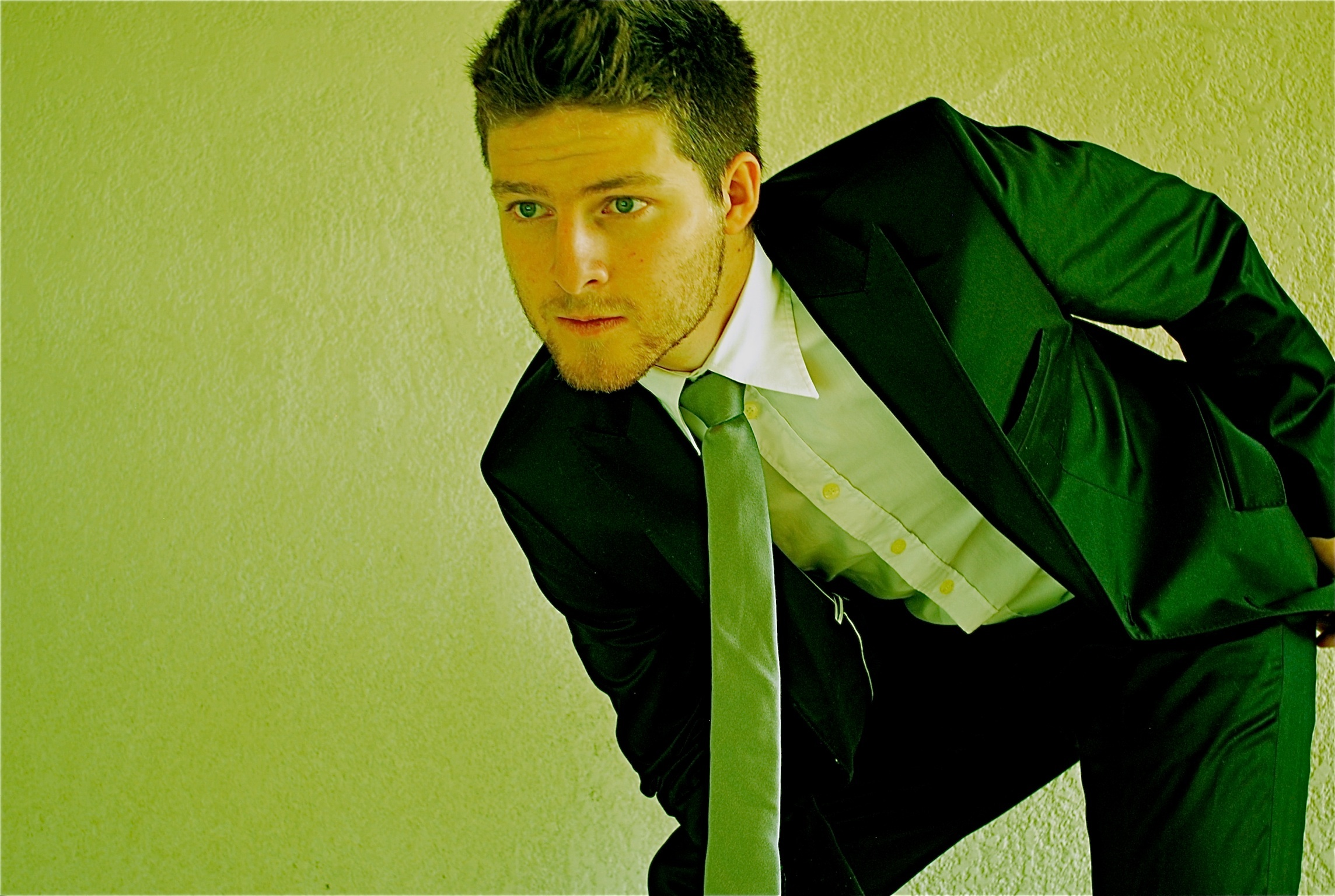
Eddy Vilard, winner for Best Male Revelation.

Best Telenovela	Best Original Story or Adaptation
Fuego en la sangre; Al diablo con los guapos; Alma de hierro; Cuidado con el ángel; Querida enemiga	Adrián Suar, Aída Guajardo and Ximena Suárez – Alma de hierro; Delia Fiallo, Carlos Romero and Tere Medina – Cuidado con el ángel; Liliana Abud and Ricardo Fiallega – Fuego en la sangre
Best Actress	Best Actor
Blanca Guerra – Alma de hierro; Adela Noriega – Fuego en la sangre; Jacqueline Bracamontes – Las tontas no van al cielo	Alejandro Camacho – Alma de hierro; Alejandro Ávila – Juro que te amo; Eduardo Yáñez – Fuego en la sangre; Jorge Salinas – Fuego en la sangre; Juan Soler – Palabra de mujer
Best Antagonist Actress	Best Antagonist Actor
Diana Bracho – Fuego en la sangre; Adamari López – Alma de hierro; Cynthia Klitbo – Palabra de mujer	Guillermo García Cantú – Fuego en la sangre; Alejandro Tommasi – Tormenta en el paraíso; Alexis Ayala – Juro que te amo
Best Leading Actress	Best Leading Actor
Helena Rojo – Cuidado con el ángel; Ana Bertha Espín – Las tontas no van al cielo; Dacia González – Al diablo con los guapos	Manuel "Flaco" Ibáñez – Las tontas no van al cielo; Manuel Ojeda – Tormenta en el paraíso; Rafael Inclán – Alma de hierro
Best Co-lead Actress	Best Co-lead Actor
Patricia Reyes Spíndola – Fuego en la sangre; Alejandra Barros – Alma de hierro; Frances Ondiviela – Tormenta en el paraíso	Jorge Poza – Alma de hierro; Agustín Arana – Palabra de mujer; René Casados – Fuego en la sangre
Best Young Lead Actress	Best Young Lead Actor
Maite Perroni – Cuidado con el ángel; Allisson Lozz – Al diablo con los guapos; Danna Paola – Querida enemiga	Eleazar Gómez – Las tontas no van al cielo; Eugenio Siller – Al diablo con los guapos; José Ron – Juro que te amo
Best Female Revelation	Best Male Revelation
Zuria Vega – Alma de hierro; Altair Jarabo – Al diablo con los guapos; Violeta Isfel – Las tontas no van al cielo	Eddy Vilard – Alma de hierro; Osvaldo de León – Palabra de mujer; Ricardo Margaleff – Al diablo con los guapos
Best Direction	Best Direction of the Cameras
Eric Morales and Xavier Romero – Alma de hierro; Édgar Ramírez and Alberto Díaz – Fuego en la sangre; Víctor Manuel Foulloux and Víctor Rodríguez – Cuidado con el ángel	Héctor Márquez and Bernardo Nájera – Alma de hierro; Claudio Lara and Armando Zafra – Al diablo con los guapos; Manuel Barajas and Jesús Acuña Lee – Fuego en la sangre

=== Others ===
Best Entertainment Program	Best Restricted TV Program
Desmadruga; Cuánto quieres perder; Hoy; TV de noche	Netas divinas; Es de noche... y ya llegué; Está cañón
Best Special Program	Best Series Made in Mexico
Plácido Domingo desde Chichén-Itzá; Concierto Alas; Emmanuel Retro desde el centro de la tierra	Mujeres asesinas; El Pantera; Los simuladores; ''S.O.S.: Sexo y otros Secretos; Terminales

=== Special awards ===
- Special Award for Career: Luís de Llano Palmer

=== Performers ===
Name(s)	Performed
Atrévete a soñar	"Las divinas" "Fiesta" "Estrella de rock"
Danna Paola	"Mundo de caramelo"
David Bisbal	"Juro que te amo"
Mijares	Mix - "Te ha robado" "Corazón Salvaje" "El privilegio de amar"
Playa Limbo	"Un gancho al corazón"
Yuri	"La mucura" "Hacia la eternidad"

=== Absent ===
People who did not attend the ceremony and were nominated in the shortlist in each category:

- Juan Soler

== In Memoriam ==
- Paco Ibañez
- Alan Ledesma (actor)
- Fernanda Villeli
- Jorge Ortiz
- Vitola (actress)
- Josefina Gil
- María Elena Marqués
- Jacqueline Voltaire
- Victor Hugo Rascon Banda
- Miguel Galván
- Miguel Córcega
- Ricardo Montalbán
- Anabel Ochoa
- Evelio Arias Ramos
