= Nosotros los guapos =

- Genre: Comedy; Satire
- Created by: Guillermo del Bosque
- Written by: Juan Carlos Castellanos; Mauricio Jalife; Omar Mustre
- Directed by: Rafael Perrín de la Rosa
- Starring: Adrián Uribe; Ariel Miramontes; Carmen Salinas; Malillany Marín; Wendy Braga; Manuel "Flaco" Ibáñez; Vanessa Bauche
- Theme music composer: Álvaro Trespalacios; Óscar Galván
- Country of origin: Mexico
- Original language: Spanish
- No. of seasons: 4
- No. of episodes: 70

Production
- Executive producer: Guillermo del Bosque
- Producers: Rosa María Noguerón; César González Olivares
- Camera setup: Multi-camera

Original release
- Network: Blim; Las Estrellas
- Release: August 19, 2016 – February 16, 2020

Related
- La hora pico; María de todos los Ángeles; Albertano contra los mostros; El príncipe del barrio

Nosotros los guapos is a Mexican sitcom that premiered on Blim on August 19, 2016, and ended on Las Estrellas on 16 February 2020. The series is created and produced by Guillermo del Bosque for Televisa. The series stars Adrián Uribe and Ariel Miramontes.

== Plot ==
Vítor and Albertano are in pursuit of the same objective: to find a place to live, and as much as they don't want to, get a job that allows them to live and pay the rent for the room that the two decide to share at Doña Cuca's house. Although at first Vítor and Albertano do not like each other, they still decide to get together to get jobs in whatever they can. From day one, Vítor and Albertano will have to "endure" their differences in tastes and different ways of seeing life.

In season four, Vítor and Albertano win the lottery and become millionaires overnight. They remain the same, although now facing new situations and making their biggest dreams come true, from living as millionaire playboys in Acapulco to giving their neighborhood the biggest party they have ever had. In addition Natacha, a former police officer, comes to their lives to become their bodyguard, friend and companion of adventures.

== Cast ==
=== Main ===
- Adrián Uribe as El Vítor
- Ariel Miramontes as Albertano
- Carmen Salinas as Refugio Encarnación Flores “Doña Cuca”
- Malillany Marín as Rosita (season 1)
- Wendy Braga as Lupita (seasons 2–3, guest season 4)
- Manuel "Flaco" Ibáñez as Don Nacho (season 2–4)
- Vanessa Bauche as Natacha (season 4)

== Episodes ==
=== Series overview ===
Season	Episodes		Originally released	
Season	Episodes		First released	Last released
1	18		August 19, 2016	
2	13		March 20, 2017	
3	13		August 28, 2017	December 1, 2017
4	26	13	July 14, 2019	August 25, 2019
4	26	13	January 19, 2020	February 16, 2020

=== Season 1 (2016) ===
No. overall	No. in season	Title	Original release date
1	1	"El encuentro"	August 19, 2016
Vítor, whose mother left the city leaving him to his fate, and Albertano, who is looking for a new home, come by chance to Doña Cuquita's house.
2	2	"Súbale, súbale"	August 19, 2016
Vítor and Albertano manage to get work as drivers in a microbuses base, but their irresponsibility is going to be very expensive.
3	3	"Payasos de fiestas infantiles"	August 19, 2016
In their attempt to get jobs, Vítor and Albertano think they are clowns for children's parties, but this fun work will not be as easy as they thought.
4	4	"Canta y no llores"	August 19, 2016
When listening to the serenade of the neighbor, Albertano and Vitor realize how much a mariachi earns, so they decide to create theirs to pay their debts.
5	5	"Campeón sin corona"	August 19, 2016
Thanks to a stroke of luck, Albertano leaves out of combat the toughest guy in the colony, an opportunity that Victor takes to make him the new promise of national boxing and thus make a lot of money.
6	6	"A bailar con la más fea"	August 19, 2016
The quinceañera party of Doña Cuca's goddaughter is close, so Vítor and Albertano see the opportunity to rent as chambelanes.
7	7	"Ilegales"	August 19, 2016
In search of a better life, Albertano and Vitor decide to embark on a journey to pursue the American dream.
8	8	"Extras de cine"	August 19, 2016
Vitor and Albertano arrive by accident to a filming set, where they are cast as part of the cast.
9	9	"El bebé"	August 19, 2016
Albertano and Vitor find a baby at the door of the house and with him a note, so they both fight for fatherhood.
10	10	"Estas son Las Mañanitas"	August 19, 2016
For Doña Cuca to forgive them a month of rent, Vítor and Albertano promise to organize her a birthday party, but the lack of money and common sense of this pair will make the celebration something truly unforgettable.
11	11	"Guía de turistas"	August 19, 2016
Vitor and Albertano decide to start their own travel agency, an unbeatable opportunity to win in dollars and to meet foreign women.
12	12	"Fiesta elegante"	August 19, 2016
Albertano and Vitor believe that they finally found a job at their height among the most select of high society
13	13	"Jefes de manzana"	August 19, 2016
Albertano and Vítor decide to launch themselves as candidates for Apple Chiefs, after all they meet the requirements to be politicians: they are liars, they like easy money and they hate to work.
14	14	"Guaruras"	August 19, 2016
Vítor and Albertano never imagined to work like jails of a famous artist much less that would end up facing the justice.
15	15	"Funeraria"	August 19, 2016
In his constant search to earn money and pay Doña Cuca rent, Vitor and Albertano are employed in a funeral home. Between errors and entanglements, they will realize that the worst thing that can happen to a person is not death.
16	16	"Despedida de soltera"	August 19, 2016
Vitor convinces Albertano to go to the gym to get in shape, without imagining that this will give him the opportunity to work on a show for women only, but desperate.
17	17	"Sonideros"	August 19, 2016
Albertano and Vitor organize a party for Rosita's birthday, but as is their custom, complicate everything and an unexpected event ends the celebration.
18	18	"El balneario"	August 19, 2016
Vitor and Albertano believe that they deserve a vacation, so they convince Doña Cuca and Rosita to organize El PaqueteMojes, an all-inclusive trip to a spa, where they will take the opportunity to show their charms.

=== Season 2 (2017) ===
No. overall	No. in season	Title	Original release date
19	1	"Cocina económica"	March 20, 2017
Vítor and Albertano will help Doña Cuca open a small restaurant in the patio of the house, Lupita will be lucky to help this unique couple.
20	2	"Fotógrafos de eventos"	March 20, 2017
Photography is a job that Victor and Albertano will have to get if they want to have a place to live, but things will not go as they thought.
21	3	"El supermercado"	March 20, 2017
An unexpected visit will appear in Doña Cuca's house that will come to stay, working in a supermarket could be the worst idea for El Vitor and Albertano.
22	4	"La secundaria"	March 20, 2017
Nacho, El Vítor and Albertano will try their luck asking for work in a school. The children and the principal will regret having as employees a trio so particular.
23	5	"El taller mecánico"	March 20, 2017
Working in an automotive workshop requires a level of knowledge that the unemployed couple will believe they have; the consequences of their inexperience will be an adventure.
24	6	"El antro"	March 20, 2017
Albertano and El Vítor find jobs in a nightclub; Nacho with a hot-dog stall will try to bring money into the house. Guest star: Sergio Mayer as Gerente
25	7	"Central de Abastos"	March 20, 2017
For Don Nacho's birthday, Doña Cuca will make pozole. Lupita, Vitor and Albertano are in charge of going to buy everything necessary, but as always, the Guapos find a way to get into trouble.
26	8	"Ya bailaron (Zócalo)"	March 20, 2017
After trying their luck as hawkers on the subway and failing; Vitor and Albertano will have to try other trades to get money and pay what they owe. Guest stars: Elizabeth Alvarez as Ana Belén, Claudia Troyo as Ximena
27	9	"Academia de policía"	March 20, 2017
After sabotaging a robbery in the colony, Vítor and Albertano decide to carry out a very important job and enlist in the police academy.
28	10	"El carnicero"	March 20, 2017
Don Nacho disappears and this worries Vítor and Albertano. They hope to get a juicy reward, so Vítor and Albertano become detectives to solve the crime of the alleged Butcher Killer. Guest stars: Salvador Sánchez as Don Nicanor, Fabián Robles as Jonás
29	11	"Los Reyes Magos"	March 20, 2017
Vítor and Albertano will decide to share the tradition of the wise men with the children and of step to earn money to be able to survive, in the end the magic will surprise them.
30	12	"Comida rápida"	March 20, 2017
Vitor and Albertano get jobs in a pizzeria, and as always, they make several mistakes; nothing serious happens until Albertano prepares a pizza with a forbidden ingredient, which generates total chaos.
31	13	"Día de las Madres"	March 20, 2017
One chance leads the mothers of Victor and Albertano to Doña Cuca's house just on Mother's Day, without them being aware. With this it is discovered that they do have a mother and that the Guapos also cry.

=== Season 3 (2017) ===
No. overall	No. in season	Title	Original release date
32	1	"Los panaderos"	August 28, 2017
Doña Cuca gets Vitor and Albertano a job at the bakery in the colony. There, Vítor discovers his talent to prepare bolillo with his "secret ingredient", while Albertano lives a frustrated love with the baker's daughter.
33	2	"La veterinaria"	August 28, 2017
Albertano discovers that he has a special talent to appease dogs and convinces Vítor so that both go to work to a veterinary.
34	3	"La estética"	August 28, 2017
Vitor and Albertano get jobs at an elegant beauty shop, surrounded by beautiful women, but although they seem to be in paradise, the friendship of the Guapos will put themselves at risk, and will discover that appearances deceive. Guest stars: Gabriel Soto as Claudio, José Luis Guarneros as Puchy
35	4	"El asilo de ancianos"	September 11, 2017
Vítor and Albertano work as caregivers in a retirement home for seniors. When one of the elders dies, the Guapos, believing themselves responsible for the death, manage to make the dead appear alive and able to attend the 100-year-old party of an elderly woman in the asylum. Guest stars: Luis Bayardo as Don Vicente, Luz María Aguilar as Doña Leonor
36	5	"La mudanza"	September 11, 2017
A job in which heavy objects have to be loaded, and with the responsibility of taking care of the belongings of others, sounds like the least indicated for Vítor and Albertano. Guest stars: Adalberto Parra as Don Paco, Fabiola Campomanes as Laura
37	6	"La Cougar"	September 11, 2017
Albertano gets a job as a yoga teacher. He initiates a romance with an attractive and wealthy mature woman, who uses him to avenge her unfaithful husband. El Vitor, without knowing, will end up paying the consequences. Guest stars: Olivia Collins as Silvia, David Ostrosky as Roberto
38	7	"¿Qué te ha dado esa mujer?"	September 29, 2017
The Guapos seem to find love; for the first time both get a girlfriend, but that romance could end their friendship forever. Guest stars: Wendy González as Luis Fernanda and María Fernanda, Frida Urbina as Lola
39	8	"El campamento"	September 29, 2017
A camping trip can be one of the most experiences for a child, but when Vítor and Albertano become guides, everything is lost. Guest star: Andrés Palacios as Miguel
40	9	"Esotéricos"	October 16, 2017
Vitor convinces Albertano to help him set up an esotericism office in the market. Vitor disguises himself as wizard, while Albertano manages to investigate the lives of clients, causing chaos with their deceptions. Guest stars: Maribel Fernández as Comadre Soco, Claudia Cervantes as Melany, Miguel Ángel Fuentes as Brujo
41	10	"La feria del pueblo"	October 27, 2017
Vitor and Albertano accompany Lupita to the fair of her town, where she meets up with an old love, who immediately becomes a rival of the Guapos. Guest stars: Ferdinando Valencia as Eladio, Sergio Reynoso as Don Lauro, Marcela Morell as Doña Martina
42	11	"Papá millonario"	November 6, 2017
By collecting a copy of his birth certificate, Vitor realizes that he does have a father and discovers that he is a millionaire, so he leaves the house. The money will test his great friendship with Albertano.
43	12	"Regreso a clases"	November 13, 2017
Vitor and Albertano are about to get a great job, but they do not get it because they need their middle school certificate. The Guapos decide to enroll in the open secondary school. Guest stars: Gabriela Rivero as Maestra, Germán Ortega as Ricky, Yuliana Peniche as Lesly
44	13	"Los vigilantes"	December 1, 2017
A wave of crimes lashes the colony and the house of Doña Cuca is not saved from the thieves. Don Nacho, Vitor and Albertano decide to form a neighborhood watch group to try to stop the delinquent. Vitor and Albertano win the lottery. Guest star: Pablo Valentín as El Güero

=== Season 4 (2019–20) ===
No. overall	No. in season	Title	Original release date	Mexico viewers (millions)
Part 1
45	1	"Premio Mayor"	July 14, 2019 (Note: Premiered early online through Las Estrellas website and YouTube channel on 10 July 2019.)	3.1
El Vítor tries to convince Albertano to share the lottery prize with him, none will loose the winning ticket until they receive the money. Guest star: Gaby Mellado as Lottery employee
46	2	"La fiesta"	July 14, 2019	3.1
As a token of appreciation with the neighborhood and to say goodbye to everyone, Vítor and Albertano throw a party with a famous artist and they close the street, so they get in trouble with the police. Guest star: Lupillo Rivera as himself
47	3	"El yate"	July 21, 2019	2.1
Vítor and Albertano decide to inaugurate their new life of millionaires making a trip to Acapulco, where they meet Jerry, a socialite that offers them the best party with the most beautiful women. Guest star: Salvador Zerboni as Jerry
48	4	"¿Qué pasó ayer?"	July 21, 2019	2.1
Vítor and Albertano wake up in the middle of nowhere, with no idea where they are, how they got there and with a terrible hangover. They will have to reconstruct the facts and find Natacha.
49	5	"Las inquilinas"	July 28, 2019	2.5
Vítor and Albertano leave Doña Cuca's house and move to a luxury apartment and believe that she will miss them. But Doña Cuca will have two new tenants who could hide a criminal secret. Guest stars: Ximena Córdoba as Angeles, Marcela Cantú as Sol, Mar Contreras as Ana
50	6	"El coche"	July 28, 2019	2.5
Vítor and Albertano decide to buy a sports car, but the car of their dreams will only bring fights, because Vítor does not want Albertano to use it, because he does not know how to drive.
51	7	"Junta de condóminos"	August 4, 2019	1.9
Vítor and Albertano organize a very scandalous party to inaugurate their apartment, provoking the anger of their neighbors, who organize themselves to kick them out of the building. Guest stars: Elizabeth Álvarez as Verónica, Ricardo Fastlicht as César, Benjamín Rivero as Héctor, Erika Bruni as Carolina, Tania Lizardo as Marcia, Yetzenia as Jaqueline Goldsmith, Iván Vega as Padre Goyo
52	8	"El cambio de look"	August 4, 2019	1.9
After failing in their attempts to get some women, Vítor and Albertano hire Matías, an expert in seduction, that will advise them to change their look, with which they will conquer whoever they want. Guest stars: Juan Soler as Matías, Talitha Becker as Lily, Diana Motta as Claudia
53	9	"Campeones (Parte 1)"	August 11, 2019	1.9
Vítor and Albertano learn that their former soccer team will play the final of the neighborhood tournament, so they will do everything to regain their place within the team Guest stars: José Luis Cordero as El Profe, David Ramos as El Chicarote, Roberto Tello as Sapotoro
54	10	"Campeones (Parte 2)"	August 11, 2019	1.9
Vítor dreams of winning the final of the neighborhood soccer tournament, and in order to achieve this, he convinces the coach not to let Albertano play, but he learns of Vítor's plan and will take revenge. Guest stars: David Ramos as El Chicarote, Roberto Tello as Sapotoro, Enrique Damar as Carachata
55	11	"Cantante grupero"	August 18, 2019	1.4
Vítor and Albertano decide to use their fortune to fulfill Albertano's greatest desire: to be a grupero singer. Vítor tries to conquer Marcia, his new neighbor. Guest stars: Verónica Montes as Sofía, Carlos de la Mota as Mario, Diego de Erice as Patricio, Tania Lizardo as Marcia
56	12	"Cazafortunas"	August 18, 2019	1.4
Vítor and Albertano meet Regina and Fernanda, two fortune hunters who immediately agree to go out with them to dinner, after knowing they are millionaires. Don Nacho learns that Dona Cuca will make a pot of mole and fears that she will carry out her evil transformation. Guest stars: Marisol González as Regina, Cynthia Urías as Fernanda
57	13	"Somos novios"	August 25, 2019	N/A
Vítor and Albertano go out to dance on a double date. Vítor's date turns out to be married and when her husband shows up, Vítor and Albertano pretend to be boyfriends to save her. Doña Cuca prepares gourmet tamales to sell them in the building. Guest stars: Mayrín Villanueva as Azul, Montserrat Marañón as Bertha, Manuel Ojeda as Miguel, Eduardo Liñán as Salvador
Part 2
58	14	"Piloto de carreras"	January 19, 2020	3.4
Vítor is an expert driving a bus and wants to take advantage of his fortune to become a racing driver, so he convinces Albertano to create his team and drive "El Guapomóvil". Guest stars: Lisardo as Jimmy, Óscar Mayorga as El Cholo, Sergio Gutiérrez as Ladrón
59	15	"Reina por un día"	January 19, 2020	3.4
Natacha meets a former classmate who teased her in school, so El Vítor and Albertano will make her pass for a successful millionaire surrounded by luxuries. Guest stars: Gabriela Zamora as Josselyn, Jorge Ortín as Johnny
60	16	"Empresarios"	January 19, 2020	3.4
Vítor and Albertano go to a car accessories store, but they are disappointed because they cannot find what they are looking for, so they will start their own company. Guest stars: Carlos Bracho as Don Jorge, Juan Carlos Nava as Mike
61	17	"Rancheros"	January 26, 2020	1.9
Vítor and Albertano are scared by insecurity and fear losing their fortune, so they decide to buy a ranch and go live in the country. Guest stars: Marlene Favela as Rosita, Sergio Acosta as Rosalío
62	18	"Wilbur"	January 26, 2020	1.9
Albertano decides to adopt Wilbur and take him to the city, but the neighbors are not happy with the arrival of the pony, so Albertano must win the neighborhood election. Guest star: Elizabeth Álvarez as Verónica
63	19	"El ex novio de Doña Cuca"	January 26, 2020	1.9
Doña Cuca is hurt because Don Nacho forgot their anniversary, so she decides to start an affair with her ex-boyfriend. Vítor and Albertano try to help Don Nacho to recover the love of Doña Cuca. Guest star: Salvador Sánchez as Don Nicanor
64	20	"Influencers"	February 2, 2020	2.2
Vítor and Albertano open social media accounts and compete with each other to see who has the most followers.
65	21	"Las Vegas"	February 2, 2020	2.2
Vítor and Albertano go to a place where only millionaires go to lose their money. They face the games of chance and the temptations of Sin City.
66	22	"Motociclistas"	February 2, 2020	2.2
Vítor convinces Albertano to form a motorcycle gang with the intention of hitting on a girl. Guest stars: Marcelo Córdoba as Charlie, Emmanuel Palomares as Checo, Ale Rivera as La Jarocha
67	23	"Día del niño"	February 9, 2020	2.3
Vítor and Albertano decide to share their fortune with those most in need, so they decide to organize a wrestling show at the elementary school where El Vítor studied. Guest stars: Zaide Silvia Gutiérrez as School principal, Latin Lover as Trainer
68	24	"La boda de mi mejor amigo"	February 9, 2020	2.3
Vítor has found the woman of his life and decides to marry her, but Albertano will do everything possible to prevent the wedding, discovering that she is a dangerous criminal. Guest stars: Geraldine Bazán as Viridiana, Lucila Mariscal as Vítor's mother, David Ramos as Chicharote, Iván Vega as Padre Goyo, Ana Lilia Renteria as Rubí
69	25	"Sin dinero"	February 9, 2020	2.3
Vítor and Albertano realize that they have spent all their money. Now they have to ask the neighbors for food to survive. Guest stars: Tania Lizardo as Marcia, Lina Radwan as Roxy, Erika Bruni as Carolina, Benjamín Rivero as Héctor, Leslie San Vicente as Bárbara, Jacqueline Goldsmith as Yetzenia
70	26	"La novia fea"	February 16, 2020	2.0
Vítor convinces Albertano to start a relationship with Bertha, an unattractive woman who is a billionaire. Guest stars: Montserrat Marañón as Bertha, Iván Vega as Padre Goyo

== Awards and nominations ==
Year	Award	Category	Nominated	Result
2017	TVyNovelas Awards	Best Comedy Program	Guillermo del Bosque	Won
2018	TVyNovelas Awards	Best Comedy Program	Guillermo del Bosque	Nominated
2019	TVyNovelas Awards	Best Comedy Program	Guillermo del Bosque	Won
2020	TVyNovelas Awards	Best Comedy Program	Guillermo del Bosque	Won
2020	TVyNovelas Awards	Best Actor in a Comedy Series	Adrián Uribe	Nominated
2020	TVyNovelas Awards	Best Actor in a Comedy Series	Ariel Miramontes	Won
