= Albertano contra los mostros =

- Genre: Sitcom
- Created by: Carlos Miramontes; Luis Cravioto
- Written by: Ariel Miramontes; Carlos Miramontes; Luis Cravioto; Jesús Salcedo; José Luis Guarneros; André Barrén
- Directed by: Rafael Perrin; Ariel Miramontes
- Starring: Ariel Miramontes; Benito Castro; Paola Fernández; José Luis Guarneros; Montserrat Marañón; Sergio Lozano; Rebeca Duvignau; Mariano Soria; Olivia Collins; Maribel Guardia
- Country of origin: Mexico
- Original language: Spanish
- No. of seasons: 1
- No. of episodes: 13

Production
- Executive producer: André Barrén
- Producer: Maricarmen Alpuche
- Production company: TelevisaUnivision

Original release
- Network: Las Estrellas; Univision
- Release: 3 April – 15 May 2022

Related
- María de todos los Ángeles; Nosotros los guapos

Albertano contra los mostros is a Mexican sitcom television series produced by André Barrén for TelevisaUnivision. It premiered first in the United States on Univision on 3 April 2022. Ariel Miramontes stars in the title role. Production of the series began on 29 October 2021. In Mexico, the series premiered on Las Estrellas on 17 April 2022.

== Plot ==
The series follows Albertano (Ariel Miramontes) and his fight against businesswoman Lola D'Bo (Maribel Guardia) and the witch Casilda (Olivia Collins). Casilda pursues Albertano in order to devour his heart in a ritual that will allow her to be eternally young and beautiful. Lola D'Bo seeks to join Casilda to obtain the secret of eternal youth.

== Cast ==
- Ariel Miramontes as Albertano Santa Cruz
- Benito Castro as Father Benito
- Paola Fernández as Encarnita
- José Luis Guarneros as El Macaco
- Montserrat Marañón as Catita
- Sergio Lozano as Dónovan
- Rebeca Duvignau as Beyoncé
- Mariano Soria as Chinicuil
- Olivia Collins as Casilda
- Maribel Guardia as Lola D'Bo

== Episodes ==
No.	Title	Mexico air date	U.S. air date	Mexico viewers (millions)	U.S. viewers (millions)
1	"El extraño retorno de Albertano Santa Cruz"	17 April 2022	3 April 2022	1.8	0.86
Guest star: Rafael Inclán as El Gran Inquisidor
2	"Presentimientos premonitorios"	17 April 2022	3 April 2022	1.8	0.66
Guest star: Rafael Inclán as El Gran Inquisidor
3	"El despertar de la momia"	24 April 2022	10 April 2022	1.4	0.81
4	"Misterio en el drenaje acondicionado"	24 April 2022	10 April 2022	1.4	0.58
5	"Forever Wisconsin"	24 April 2022	17 April 2022	1.4	0.76
Guest star: Alejandro Tommasi as Prudencio Hurtado
6	"La magna arena nopala"	1 May 2022	17 April 2022	1.3	0.59
7	"El origen del mal"	1 May 2022	24 April 2022	1.3	0.72
Guest stars: Rafael Inclán as El Gran Inquisidor, Moisés Arizmendi as Bermejo
8	"Una hermana mediática"	1 May 2022	24 April 2022	1.3	0.46
Guest star: Alma Cero as Rosa Aurora
9	"El libro de los hechizos"	8 May 2022	1 May 2022	1.3	0.71
Guest stars: Alma Cero as Rosa Aurora, Rafael Inclán as El Gran Inquisidor
10	"La adopción de Beyoncé"	8 May 2022	1 May 2022	1.3	0.52
11	"Buscando al Tropi Rock"	8 May 2022	8 May 2022	1.3	0.74
Guest stars: Galilea Montijo as herself, Memo Ríos as El Tropi Rock, Jesús Guzmán as El Borrachito
12	"Cantando por un destino"	15 May 2022	8 May 2022	1.1	0.44
Guest star: Galilea Montijo as herself
13	"La batalla final"	15 May 2022	TBA	1.1	TBA
Guest stars: Rafael Inclán as El Gran Inquisidor, Galilea Montijo as herself
