= El príncipe del barrio =

- Genre: Sitcom
- Written by: Juan Carlos Castellanos; Jurgan Jacobo; Gerard Jalife; Ariel Miramontes
- Directed by: Juan Carlos Nava; Jurgan Jacobo; Daniel Chávez Marín
- Starring: Ariel Miramontes; Violeta Isfel; Luis Fernando Peña; Alma Cero; José Luis Guarneros; Eduardo Espinosa; Cecilia Galliano; Juan Soler; Arturo Peniche; José Luis Rodríguez; Ricardo Fastlicht; Abelito Saenz; Cynthia Urías
- Country of origin: Mexico
- Original language: Spanish
- No. of seasons: 4
- No. of episodes: 57

Production
- Executive producer: Rosa María Noguerón
- Producer: César Carlos González Olivares
- Production company: TelevisaUnivision

Original release
- Network: Las Estrellas
- Release: 2 July 2023 – present

El príncipe del barrio is a Mexican sitcom television series produced by Rosa María Noguerón for TelevisaUnivision. The series is inspired by the play Lagunilla, mi barrio, itself an adaptation of the 1981 Mexican film of the same name. It premiered on Las Estrellas on 2 July 2023. The series stars an ensemble cast of Ariel Miramontes, Violeta Isfel, Luis Fernando Peña, José Luis Guarneros, Alma Cero, Eduardo Espinosa, Cecilia Galliano, and Juan Soler.

In February 2026, the series was renewed for a fourth season that premiered on 19 July 2026.

== Premise ==
The series follows Albertano (Ariel Miramontes), who after becoming independent from his family, decides to move to Lomas de Chacaltepec, where everyone seeks love and fortune.

== Cast ==
- Ariel Miramontes as Albertano
- Violeta Isfel as Polly
- Luis Fernando Peña as Commander (seasons 1-2)
- Alma Cero as La Jarocha
- José Luis Guarneros as Britney
- Eduardo Espinosa as El Morro
- Cecilia Galliano as Yesenia (seasons 1-3)
- Juan Soler as Manolo (season 1)
- Arturo Peniche as Manolo (season 2)
- José Luis Rodríguez "El Guana" as Commander (season 3)
- Ricardo Fastlicht as Gaspar (seasons 3-present)
- Abelito Saenz as El Mayor (season 4)
- Cynthia Urías as Lucía (season 4)

== Episodes ==
=== Series overview ===
Series	Episodes	Originally released	
Series	Episodes	First released	Last released
1	14	2 July 2023	13 August 2023
2	15	14 April 2024	12 May 2024
3	14	15 June 2025	21 September 2025
4	14	19 July 2026	30 August 2026

=== Season 1 (2023) ===
No. overall	No. in season	Title	Original release date	Mexico viewers (millions)
1	1	"Bienvenido al pueblo mágico de Lomas de Chacaltepec"	2 July 2023	1.8
2	2	"La flor más bella de Chacaltepec"	2 July 2023	1.8
3	3	"La boda de La Jarocha y Albertano"	9 July 2023	1.8
4	4	"El nuevo jefe de seguridad de Lomas de Chacaltepec"	9 July 2023	1.8
5	5	"Albertano se convierte en el marido falso de Hipólita"	16 July 2023	1.2
6	6	"Albertano e Hipólita se convierten en novios"	16 July 2023	1.2
7	7	"Albertano invita a todos sus amigos a la ida al balneario de Yesenia y Don Manolo"	23 July 2023	1.9
8	8	"Un misterioso cuerpo aparece en medio de las calles de Lomas de Chacaltepec"	23 July 2023	1.9
9	9	"El Pueblo Mágico de Lomas de Chacaltepec"	30 July 2023	1.4
10	10	"La verdadera identidad de Maximino"	30 July 2023	1.4
11	11	"El cumpleaños de Albertano y la casa embrujada"	6 August 2023	1.5
12	12	"Los múltiples robos en Lomas de Chacaltepec"	6 August 2023	1.5
13	13	"El cambio de look de Hipólita"	13 August 2023	1.6
14	14	"El concurso de la Feria del Elote de Chacaltepec"	13 August 2023	1.6

=== Season 2 (2024) ===
No. overall	No. in season	Title	Original release date	Mexico viewers (millions)
15	1	"Albertano se muda"	14 April 2024	1.77
16	2	"Nora, la cuñada incómoda"	14 April 2024	1.77
17	3	"Cambios de pareja"	14 April 2024	1.77
18	4	"Ceniciento"	21 April 2024	1.73
19	5	"El coach"	21 April 2024	1.73
20	6	"El perro de Morro"	21 April 2024	1.73
21	7	"El zoológico"	28 April 2024	N/A
22	8	"El pueblo de la Jarocha"	28 April 2024	N/A
23	9	"Cambio de cuerpos"	28 April 2024	N/A
24	10	"El Premiototote"	5 May 2024	1.76
25	11	"La esposa de Albertano"	5 May 2024	1.76
26	12	"Mal de ojo"	5 May 2024	1.76
27	13	"Los XV años de Britney"	12 May 2024	1.49
28	14	"El coche de Britney"	12 May 2024	1.49
29	15	"El desalojo"	12 May 2024	1.49

=== Season 3 (2025) ===
No. overall	No. in season	Title	Original release date (Note: All fourteen episodes of the third season were released on Vix on 30 May 2025, ahead of its weekly Las Estrellas premieres.)	Mexico viewers (millions)
30	1	"Regreso a Chacaltepec"	15 June 2025	1.88
31	2	"El cambio de Giro"	29 June 2025	1.75
32	3	"Albertanieves"	6 July 2025	2.36
33	4	"Albertano Comediante"	13 July 2025	1.96
34	5	"El papá de Polly"	20 July 2025	1.61
35	6	"La virgen de la humedad"	27 July 2025	1.97
36	7	"Romance ranchero"	3 August 2025	2.51
37	8	"El embarazo de Britney"	10 August 2025	1.90
38	9	"El viaje en avión"	17 August 2025	2.12
39	10	"El bartender"	24 August 2025	2.30
40	11	"Un amor de telenovela"	31 August 2025	2.37
41	12	"El estafador de insta"	7 September 2025	2.28
42	13	"La prima de la Jarocha"	14 September 2025	2.23
43	14	"Siempre tendremos Chacaltepec"	21 September 2025	2.46

=== Season 4 (2026) ===
No. overall	No. in season	Title	Original release date (Note: All fourteen episodes of the fourth season were released on Vix on 19 June 2026, ahead of its weekly Las Estrellas premieres.)	Mexico viewers (millions)
44	1	"El regreso a Chacaltepec"	19 July 2026	1.73
45	2	"El rompimiento"	19 July 2026	1.73
46	3	"La fundación de Chacaltepec"	26 July 2026	2.05
47	4	"Náufragos en Xochimilco"	26 July 2026	2.05
48	5	"El héroe"	2 August 2026	2.11
49	6	"El comercial"	2 August 2026	2.11
50	7	"La visita de Doña Lucha"	9 August 2026	1.84
51	8	"El Albertanocho"	9 August 2026	1.84
52	9	"El manantial"	16 August 2026	1.68
53	10	"La leyenda de la chillona"	16 August 2026	1.68
54	11	"El tamal más grande"	23 August 2026	2.12
55	12	"Albertano se empodera"	23 August 2026	2.12
56	13	"Pócima de amor"	30 August 2026	2.17
57	14	"Albertano se casa"	30 August 2026	2.17

== Production ==
On 18 May 2023, it was reported that Ariel Miramontes had begun production on a new series titled Lomas de Chacaltepec, with Juan Soler being cast as well. On 22 May 2023, it was announced that the series would be inspired by the play Lagunilla, mi barrio, with most of the cast reprising their roles in the television adaptation. On 24 May 2023, El príncipe del barrio was announced as the official title of the series. The series premiered on 2 July 2023. Filming of the third season began on 18 February 2025. The third season premiered on 15 June 2025. Filming of the fourth season began on 9 February 2026. The fourth season premiered on 19 July 2026.

== Reception ==
=== Ratings ===
Viewership and ratings per season of El príncipe del barrio
Season	Timeslot (CT)	Episodes	First aired		Last aired		Avg. viewers (millions)
Season	Timeslot (CT)	Episodes	Date	Viewers (millions)	Date	Viewers (millions)	Avg. viewers (millions)
1	Sunday 7:30 p.m.	14	2 July 2023	1.80	13 August 2023	1.60	1.60
2	Sunday 7:30 p.m.	12	14 April 2024	1.77	12 May 2024	1.49	1.69
3	Sunday 8:00 p.m.	14	15 June 2025	1.88	21 September 2025	2.46	2.12
4	Sunday 7:30 p.m.	14	19 July 2026	1.73	30 August 2026	2.17	1.96

=== Awards and nominations ===
Year	Award	Category	Nominated	Result	Ref
2024	Produ Awards	Best Sitcom	El príncipe del barrio	Nominated	
2024	Produ Awards	Best Lead Actor - Sitcom	Ariel Miramontes	Nominated	
2025	Produ Awards	Best Sitcom	El príncipe del barrio	Nominated	
