= TVyNovelas Award for Best Series =

TVyNovelas Award category

- Awarded for: Best television series
- First award: 2008; El Pantera
- Currently held by: 2020; Silvia Pinal, frente a ti

== Winners and nominees ==
=== 2000s ===
Winner	Nominated
26th TVyNovelas Awards
El Pantera by Alexis Ayala and Marco Vinicio	S.O.S.: Sexo y otros Secretos by Benjamin Cann, Javier Williams and Andrea Salas; ¿Y ahora qué hago? by Adal Ramones and Eduardo Suárez Castellot; 13 miedos by Billy Rovzar, Fernando Rovzar, Alejandro Lozano, Urtzi Alejandre, Fernando Sáenz and Alexis Fridman
27th TVyNovelas Awards
Mujeres asesinas by Pedro Torres	El Pantera by Alexis Ayala and Marco Vinicio; Los simuladores; S.O.S.: Sexo y otros Secretos by Benjamin Cann, Javier Williams and Andrea Salas; Terminales by Benjamin Cann

=== 2010s ===
Winner	Nominated
28th TVyNovelas Awards
María de todos los Ángeles by Mara Escalante and André Barren	El Pantera by Alexis Ayala and Marco Vinicio; Los simuladores
29th TVyNovelas Awards
Gritos de muerte y libertad by Leopoldo Gómez	Hermanos y Detectives by Javier G. Williams; Locas de amor by Carmen Armendáriz; Los simuladores
30th TVyNovelas Awards
El encanto del águila by Bernardo Gómez, Leopoldo Gómez and Pedro Torres	Los héroes del norte by Gustavo Loza; Mujeres asesinas 3 by Pedro Torres
31st TVyNovelas Awards
Los héroes del norte by Gustavo Loza	Cloroformo by Gustavo Loza; Miss XV by Pedro Damián
32nd TVyNovelas Awards
María de todos los Ángeles by Pedro Ortiz de Pinedo and Mara Escalante	Gossip Girl Acapulco by Pedro Torres; Cásate Conmigo mi amor by Carmen Armendáriz; Nueva vida by Luis de Llano Macedo
~~2015 and 2016~~
35th TVyNovelas Awards
Mujeres de negro by Carlos Moreno	Blue Demon by Daniel Ucros; Login by Carlos Murguía; Yago by Carmen Armendáriz
36th TVyNovelas Awards
Hoy voy a cambiar by Rubén Galindo and Santiago Galindo	Dogma by Leonardo Zimbrón and Mónica Vargas; Érase una vez by Pitipol Ybarra
~~2019~~
38th TVyNovelas Awards
Silvia Pinal, frente a ti by Carla Estrada	Los elegidos by Andrés Santamaría; Sin miedo a la verdad by Rubén Galindo

== Records ==
- Most awarded series: María de todos los Ángeles, 2 times.
- Most nominated series: El Pantera and Los simuladores with 3 nominations.
- Most nominated series without a win: Los simuladores with 3 nominations.
- Series winning after short time: María de todos los Ángeles (2010 and 2014), 4 years difference.
