= Laura González =

Laura González may refer to:

- Laura González (rugby union)
- Laura González (Miss Colombia)
- Laura G, Mexican television presenter and journalist
