= Mara Escalante =

Mexican actress, comedian and singer

Mara Escalante (born Reyna Margarita Chávez Escalante, January 4, 1968) is a Mexican actress, comedian and singer, best known as the star of the Televisa sitcom María de todos los Ángeles, in which she portrays three roles, including the title role. Escalante's career dates to the mid-1990s.

A native of Mexico City and an UNAM and Instituto Andres Soler alumna, Escalante first received international fame as a stand-up comedian, developing such characters as "Nancy Aerobics", "Chu-Ly (La Princesa Dragon)", "Dona Lucha" and "Liboria", a female police officer.

Her international appeal took her from several Televisa series such as Humor es...los comediantes, Al ritmo de la noche, Al fin de semana and Otro rollo to television programs in other Spanish-speaking countries, including the Venezuelan talk show Viviana a la medianoche as well as a TV special in Spain. Most of her Televisa appearances, as well as her appearance on Viviana a la medianoche, have been broadcast on the Univision network in the United States. In 2008, she joined the Televisa team at the Beijing Olympics, performing comedy during network coverage, thus making her the first Mexican comic to visit China. She has also performed in the United States and other Latin American countries.

In 2009, she starred in her own television series, María de todos los Ángeles, which is based on another character she created as a stand-up comedian. The series has been shown on Televisa's Canal de las Estrellas and on Univision.

In 2010, she performed comedy during the Televisa coverage of the 2010 FIFA World Cup in South Africa.

Although Escalante still works in Mexico City, she now lives in Veracruz.

In 2025, Escalante created and starred in the sitcom Muero por Marilú.
