= Muero por Marilú =

- Genre: Sitcom
- Created by: Mara Escalante
- Written by: Mara Escalante; Brenda Anakaren Torres Villarreal; Javi Cabrera; Carlos Guridi Canizales; Rafael Alonso Campos Romero; Bruno Rubio Gutiérrez; Omar Francisco Rubio Gutiérrez
- Directed by: Mara Escalante; Javi Cabrera; Juan Carlos Nava
- Starring: Mara Escalante; Lisardo; José Luis Rodríguez; Laura Luz; Alma Rosa Añorve; Brenda Anakaren; Ricardo Mendoza; Adrián Emilio Escalante
- Country of origin: Mexico
- Original language: Spanish
- No. of seasons: 2
- No. of episodes: 30

Production
- Executive producers: Rosa María Noguerón; Mara Escalante
- Producer: César C. González Olivares
- Production company: TelevisaUnivision

Original release
- Network: Las Estrellas
- Release: 23 February 2025 – present

Muero por Marilú is a Mexican sitcom television series created by Mara Escalante for TelevisaUnivision. Escalante stars as Marilú, a secretary who inherits a part of the luxurious funeral home where she works. It premiered on Las Estrellas on 23 February 2025. In November 2025, the series was renewed for a second season that premiered on 10 May 2026.

== Cast ==
- Mara Escalante as Marilú
- Lisardo as Matías
- José Luis Rodríguez "El Guana" as Miguel Ignacio "Nachito"
- Laura Luz as Porfiria
- Alma Rosa Añorve as Amparito
- Brenda Anakaren as Beatriz
- Ricardo Mendoza "El Coyote" as Axayácatl
- Adrián Emilio Escalante as Iker

== Episodes ==
Series	Episodes	Originally released	
Series	Episodes	First released	Last released
1	15	23 February 2025	8 June 2025
2	15	10 May 2026	7 June 2026

=== Season 1 (2025) ===
No. overall	No. in season	Title	Original release date	Mexico viewers (millions)
1	1	"ALV: A la venta"	23 February 2025	2.93
2	2	"A la madre"	2 March 2025	2.92
3	3	"Fierro viejo"	9 March 2025	2.13
4	4	"La culpa"	16 March 2025	2.35
5	5	"El nombre es lo de menos"	23 March 2025	2.43
6	6	"Ave María"	30 March 2025	2.41
7	7	"El Gran Payán"	6 April 2025	2.30
8	8	"La familia perfecta"	13 April 2025	2.21
9	9	"Dejalo ir"	20 April 2025	1.60
10	10	"Un funeral de autor"	27 April 2025	2.33
11	11	"Aprendiendo a manejar"	4 May 2025	1.91
12	12	"Divide y vencerás"	11 May 2025	1.61
13	13	"Pena máxima"	18 May 2025	1.49
14	14	"Harakiri"	1 June 2025	2.27
15	15	"La última y nos vamos"	8 June 2025	2.63

=== Season 2 (2026) ===
No. overall	No. in season	Title	Original release date (Note: All fifteen episodes of the second season were released on Vix on 10 April 2026, ahead of their weekly Las Estrellas premieres.)	Mexico viewers (millions)
16	1	"En recuperación"	10 May 2026	1.61
17	2	"Dos de lengua"	10 May 2026	1.61
18	3	"Remordimientos funerarios"	10 May 2026	1.61
19	4	"Una muerte anunciada"	17 May 2026	1.65
20	5	"El mundo ideal"	17 May 2026	1.65
21	6	"La libretita"	17 May 2026	1.65
22	7	"Expo Muerto"	24 May 2026	1.54
23	8	"Recorte de personal"	24 May 2026	1.54
24	9	"La médium"	24 May 2026	1.54
25	10	"Hotaka ataca"	31 May 2026	1.52
26	11	"Cambio de roles"	31 May 2026	1.52
27	12	"Picnic"	31 May 2026	1.52
28	13	"El Ronco"	7 June 2026	1.50
29	14	"Entierra a tu rival"	7 June 2026	1.50
30	15	"La verdad sale a la luz"	7 June 2026	1.50

== Ratings ==
Viewership and ratings per season of Muero por Marilú
Season	Episodes	First aired		Last aired		Avg. viewers (millions)
Season	Episodes	Date	Viewers (millions)	Date	Viewers (millions)	Avg. viewers (millions)
1	15	23 February 2025	2.93	8 June 2025	2.63	2.23
2	15	10 May 2026	1.61	7 June 2026	1.50	1.56
