= Más vale sola =

- Genre: Sitcom
- Created by: Reynaldo López
- Written by: Maricarmen Morfín; Gustavo Munguía; César González; Alfonso Villalpando; Reynaldo López
- Directed by: Abril Mayett
- Starring: María Elena Saldaña; Cecilia Galliano
- Country of origin: Mexico
- Original language: Spanish
- No. of seasons: 2
- No. of episodes: 30

Production
- Executive producer: Reynaldo López
- Production company: TelevisaUnivision

Original release
- Network: Las Estrellas
- Release: 1 September 2024 – present

Más vale sola is a Mexican sitcom television series created by Reynaldo López for TelevisaUnivision. The series series stars María Elena Saldaña and Cecilia Galliano. It premiered on Las Estrellas on 1 September 2024. In October 2025, the series was renewed for a second season that premiered on 22 February 2026.

== Plot ==
The series follows Julieta Romeo and Pilar Maldonado, who happen to be half-sisters, since their father Amador, had two families, one in Mexico and the other in Argentina, without either knowing of the existence of the other. While on a date, Amador overdoses on Viagra and is hospitalized, a situation that leads the sisters to suddenly meet. Due to different situations, Julieta and Pilar end up living together despite being the complete opposite of each other in personality, habits and manners.

== Cast ==
- María Elena Saldaña as Julieta Romeo
- Cecilia Galliano as Pilar Maldonado
- Manuel "Flaco" Ibáñez as Amador
- Alexis Ayala as Gastón
- Tony Balardi as Noé
- Alejandro Rodríguez as Mateo
- Diana Carreiro as Valentina
- Melissa Ortega as Irma
- Ricardo Mendoza as Ramiro
- Michel López as Ulises
- Daniela Ibáñez as Sofía
- Daniela Baeza as Daniela

== Production ==
Filming of the pilot took place in September 2023. Initially, Benito Castro was to be part of the cast, reuniting with María Elena Saldaña after starring together in La Güereja y algo más; however, due to his death, he was replaced by Manuel "Flaco" Ibáñez. Filming for the rest of the season began on 8 May 2024. Filming of the second season began on 9 October 2025.

== Episodes ==
Series	Episodes	Originally released	
Series	Episodes	First released	Last released
1	16	1 September 2024	15 December 2024
2	14	22 February 2026	22 March 2026

=== Season 1 (2024) ===
No. overall	No. in season	Title	Original release date	Mexico viewers (millions)
1	1	"¡Sorpresa!"	1 September 2024	2.00
2	2	"El estorbo"	8 September 2024	2.12
3	3	"La protesta"	15 September 2024	1.74
4	4	"El premio"	22 September 2024	2.03
5	5	"Cumpleaños con Madres"	29 September 2024	2.21
6	6	"La confusión"	6 October 2024	1.48
7	7	"La nueva novia"	13 October 2024	1.56
8	8	"Piensa positivo"	20 October 2024	1.93
9	9	"La nueva hermana"	27 October 2024	1.59
10	10	"El perro"	3 November 2024	1.49
11	11	"La bomba"	10 November 2024	1.98
12	12	"La madrastra"	17 November 2024	1.67
13	13	"Tashida la renta"	24 November 2024	1.35
14	14	"El torito"	1 December 2024	1.37
15	15	"De tin marín..."	8 December 2024	N/A
16	16	"Aquí se rompió una taza"	15 December 2024	N/A

=== Season 2 (2026) ===
No. overall	No. in season	Title	Original release date (Note: All fourteen episodes of the second season were released on Vix on 23 January 2026, ahead of their weekly Las Estrellas premieres.)	Mexico viewers (millions)
17	1	"Lorenzo"	22 February 2026	1.79
18	2	"Lo que el viento regresó"	23 January 2026 (Vix)	N/A
19	3	"La cena íntima"	22 February 2026	1.79
20	4	"La favorita"	23 January 2026 (Vix)	N/A
21	5	"¿Quién anda ahí?"	22 February 2026	1.79
22	6	"El actor"	8 March 2026	1.69
23	7	"La hipnosis"	8 March 2026	1.69
24	8	"Deseo cumplido"	8 March 2026	1.69
25	9	"La pastilla"	15 March 2026	1.73
26	10	"Guerra de amazonas"	15 March 2026	1.73
27	11	"Buscando a mi sugar daddy"	15 March 2026	1.73
28	12	"Felices los cuatro"	22 March 2026	1.74
29	13	"Apocalipsis zombie"	22 March 2026	1.74
30	14	"El novio de Valentina"	22 March 2026	1.74

== Ratings ==
Viewership and ratings per season of Más vale sola
Season	Episodes	First aired		Last aired		Avg. viewers (millions)
Season	Episodes	Date	Viewers (millions)	Date	Viewers (millions)	Avg. viewers (millions)
1	14	1 September 2024	2.00	15 December 2024	N/A	1.75
2	12	22 February 2026	1.79	22 March 2026	1.74	1.74
