= Alan Ledesma (actor) =

Mexican actor (1977–2008)

Edgar Alan Ledesma Campos (November 26, 1977 – February 25, 2008) was a Mexican television actor, also known as Alan Ledesma or Alain Ledesma, best known for appearing in a series of popular telenovelas.

Born in Mexico City, Ledesma appeared in many Mexican telenovelas including Toma libre, Casos de la vida real, Punto de quiebra, Otro rollo and Mujer.

== Illness ==
Diagnosed with stomach cancer, he underwent surgery to remove parts of his intestines and liver after it was found that the cancer had spread. He began undergoing chemotherapy treatments on February 13, 2008, which forced him to stop work on the telenovela Las tontas no van al cielo.

== Death ==
He died on February 25, 2008, in his native Mexico City at the age of 30.

== Filmography ==
- "Lola...Érase una vez" as Julio (2007)
- "Código postal" as Angel Moreno (2007)
- "Pablo y Andrea" as Osvaldo Montero (2005)
- "Clap!... El lugar de tus sueños" (2003)
- "La Intrusa" as David (2001)
- "Rayito de luz" (2000)
- "DKDA: Sueños de juventud" (1999)
- "Infierno en el Paraiso" as Julio (1999)
