= Ariel Miramontes =

Mexican actor and comedian

- Born: Ariel Miramontes; July 31, 1970 (age 55); Mexico City, Mexico, North America.
- Occupations: actor; film dubbling actor; comedian
- Years active: 1996–present

Ariel Miramontes known as "Albertano", is a Mexican actor and comedian who has participated in various television and film productions.

== Biography ==
His artistic career began in the theater, where he participated in works such as "El Soñador Navegante" and "Al Pie de la Letra", for which he won the Male Newcomer award in 1998.

His jump to television came with his participation in the program "Make me laugh and you will be a millionaire", where he played his emblematic character "Albertano". Later, he starred in the series María de todos los Ángeles and Nosotros los guapos, both Televisa productions.

== Filmography ==
=== Character as Abertano ===
- María de todos los Ángeles (2009–2014)
- Nosotros los guapos (2016–2019)
- perdiendo el juicio (2021)
- Albertano contra los mostros (2023)
- El príncipe del barrio (2023–2024)

=== Other characters ===
- La leyenda de Nahuala (2007)
- La leyenda de la Llorona (2011)
- La familia P. Luche (2012) - Regulo
- Planes (2013) - Chupacabras (Voice Spanish Hispanic American)
- Smurfs: The Lost Village (2017) - Gargamel (Voice Spanish North American)
