= Wendy Braga =

Mexican actress, television presenter and dancer

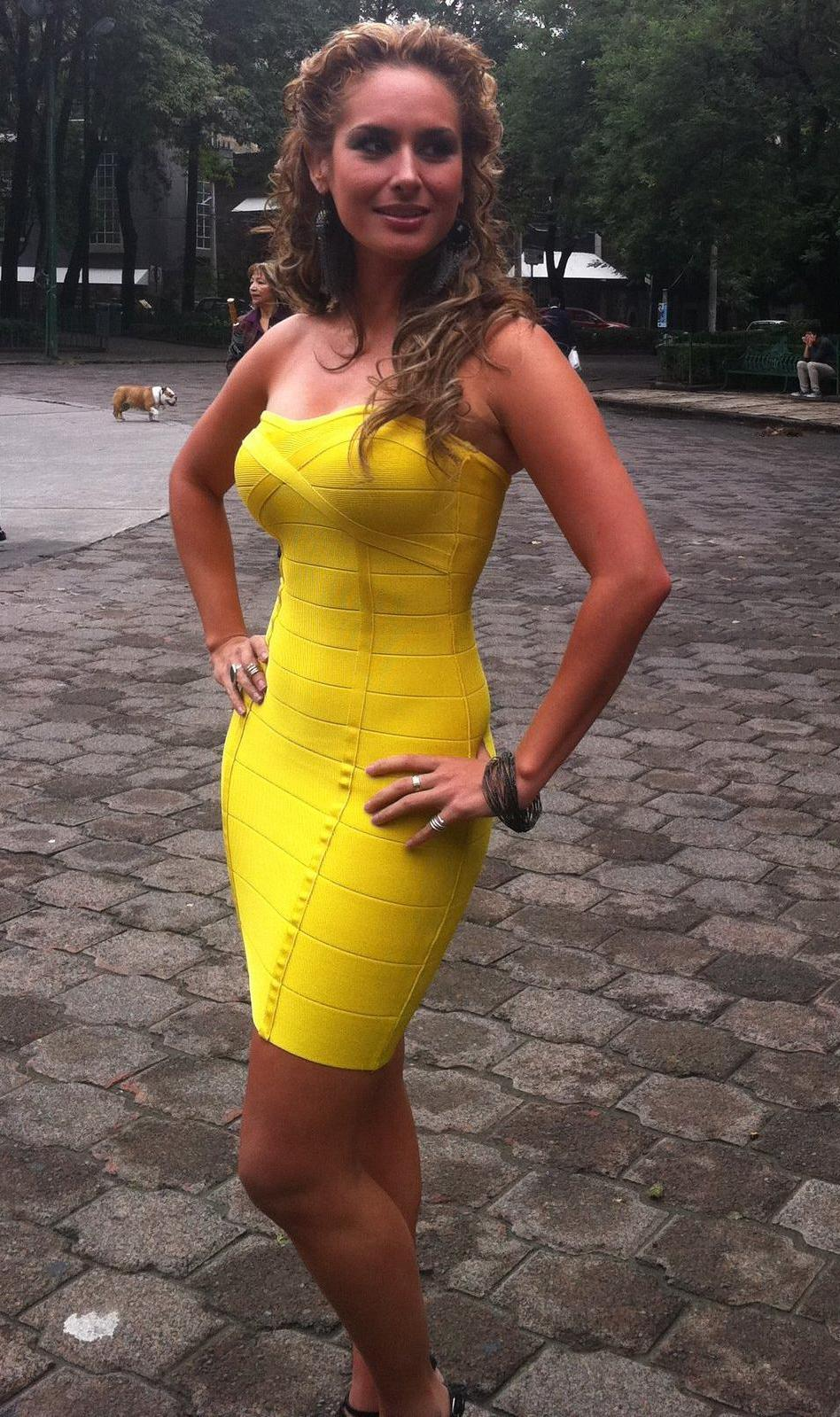
Wendy Braga

Wendy Braga (born 25 April 1983) is a Mexican actress, dancer, model and television host.

== Biography ==
She was born in Mérida, Yucatán. At four years old, she began studying ballet and later danced professionally with the National Company of Cuba in Mérida. At age 18, she opened a dance school where she teaches sporadically.

In 1999, she began her career as a presenter of the television program Efecto joven on Channel 13 in Mérida. In 2002, she presented the program Carnaval Superior Mérida 2002 of TV Azteca Mérida, and in 2003 she hosted Aquí en el 2.

She earned a degree in Communication Sciences in 2003 and a specialty in Film, Radio, Television, and Journalism in 2005, both from Universidad Anáhuac.

In 2009, she was chosen to be the face of Yucatán in the Bicentennial, as part of a TV Azteca campaign promoting tourist and natural attractions in Mexico.

== Filmography ==
Film roles
Year	Title	Role	Notes
2007	La Santa Muerte	Cecilia	
2014	Volando bajo	Yolanda Del Mar	
2015	Pinches Actores	Karina	

Television roles
Year	Title	Role	Notes
2004	Hit popular	Herself	Host
2005	Elektrízate	Herself	Host
2008	Amor sin condiciones	Elisa	
2008	Alma legal	Ivonne	
2008	Cambio de vida	Marlene	
2009	Decisiones extremas	Estela	Episode: Estela de la noche
2010	Quiéreme tonto	Lolita	
2013-2018	Noches con Platanito	Herself	2 episodes
2016-2018	Como dice el dicho	Various roles	4 episodes
2016	Hada Madrina	Luz	Main role: 24 episodes
2016–present	Nosotros los guapos	Lupita	Lead role
2018	Tenías que ser tú		6 episodes
2018	Like	Brenda	
