= La Taxista =

Mexican telenovela

- Promotional poster
- Genre: Telenovela
- Based on: Eres mi tesoro by Yusef Rumie
- Screenplay by: Gabriela Rodríguez
- Story by: Pablo Riquelme; Francisco Bobadilla; Luis Ponce; Rosario Valenzuela; Isabel Bidnisch
- Directed by: Rodrigo Curiel; Luís Reyes
- Starring: Ana Belena; Marcus Ornellas; Mike Biaggio; Julio Camejo; Cecilia Galliano
- Opening theme: "Colgando en tus manos" by Carlos Baute & Marta Sánchez
- Country of origin: Mexico
- Original language: Spanish
- No. of seasons: 1
- No. of episodes: 80

Production
- Executive producer: Agustín Restrepo

Original release
- Network: Imagen Televisión
- Release: 17 September 2018 – 10 January 2019

La Taxista is a Mexican telenovela produced by Imagen Televisión, and stars Ana Belena, Marcus Ornellas, and Cecilia Galliano. It is an adaptation of the Chilean telenovela titled Eres mi tesoro created by Yusef Rumie. It premiered on 17 September 2018 and ended on 10 January 2019.

== Plot ==
Victoria (Ana Belena), a woman who, with enthusiasm and joy, attempts to move forward her mother Lupita (Martha Mariana Castro) and her sister, Marion (Vanessa Silva) driving the taxi of her late father. Victoria's main concern is her daughter Daniela (Camila Rivas), a small girl with different abilities that fills with joy their humble home. Everyone expects Victoria to marry Juan (Mike Biaggio), the man they believe is perfect for her and who also adores Daniela. Juan asks Victoria and little Daniela for marriage, and the girl accepts without hesitation. Victoria, who loves him with all her heart, but as a friend, accepts the proposal because of the well-intentioned pressure of her family and because she believes that she will not find a better father for her daughter. Victoria falls in love with Alvaro when she almost run him over with her taxi. Alvaro (Marcus Ornellas), is a successful automotive entrepreneur, who is emotionally destroyed after learning that Carolina (Cecilia Galliano), his wife, has been unfaithful. Álvaro, about to suffer a heart attack, asks Victoria for help, who gets him into the taxi and using her driving skills, manages to take him to the hospital saving his life. This experience unites Victoria and Álvaro in a relationship. The taxi driver and the businessman will fight for their love, showing that there are always second chances.

== Cast ==
- Ana Belena as Victoria Martínez Contreras
- Marcus Ornellas as Álvaro Lizárraga Larios
- Mike Biaggio as Juan
- Julio Camejo as Rodrigo Moreal Castillo
- Cecilia Galliano as Carolina Ruíz Lizárraga
- Martha Mariana Castro as Lupita Contreras
- Carmen Beato as Emilia Larios Viuda de Lizárraga
- Julieta Grajales as Susana
- Perla Encinas as Clara Lizárraga Larios
- Vanessa Silva as Marion Martínez Contreras
- Eduardo Shacklet as Abundio "El Tigre" Pizarro
- Abel Fernando as Pancho
- Daniel Barona as Patricio Lizárraga Ruíz
- Marco León as Ricardo "Richie" Pizarro
- Tamara Guzmán as Lolia
- Camila Rivas as Daniela Martínez
- Óscar Casanova as Cerillo

== Ratings ==
Viewership and ratings per season of La Taxista
Season	Episodes	First aired		Last aired		Avg. viewers (millions)	18–49 rank
Season	Episodes	Date	Viewers (millions)	Date	Viewers (millions)	Avg. viewers (millions)	18–49 rank
1	71 (Note: Should reflect the number of episodes that contribute to the average given in the last column.)	17 September 2018	0.52	10 January 2018	0.80	0.65	TBD

== Episodes ==
No.	Title	Original release date	Mexico viewers (millions)
1	"Me has roto el corazón"	17 September 2018	0.52
Álvaro discovers a painful truth that puts his life in danger.
2	"¿Quién es tu amante?"	18 September 2018	0.66
Alvaro is about to discover the name of Carolina's lover and the find could destroy his present, while Victoria's future hangs in the balance when she is prey to insecurity.
3	"Nace un nuevo amor"	19 September 2018	0.77
Juan discovers that Victoria and Álvaro are much more involved than he thought, besides, Carolina surprises them in a very compromising moment.
4	"Un romántico viaje"	20 September 2018	0.71
An unexpected trip could unleash the romance between Alvaro and Victoria, and when the news reaches the ears of Carolina a true chaos is unleashed.
5	"Presa de los celos"	21 September 2018	0.70
Richi is prey to jealousy and puts Marión in a very uncomfortable situation. Juan defends his commitment to Victoria.
6	"Contratada de nuevo"	24 September 2018	0.68
The outburst of jealousy by Juan against Álvaro shore Victoria to make a tough decision, in addition, Daniela's operation could put their future at risk.
7	"Enamorados"	25 September 2018	0.78
The roads of Alvaro and Victoria could join when Victoria makes Juan, her fiancé, a hard confession.
8	"Inevitable atracción"	26 September 2018	0.86
The attraction between Alvaro and Victoria is inevitable, and when a first kiss approaches the least suitable person could discover them.
9	"La verdad acerca de Carolina"	27 September 2018	0.76
Victoria confesses to Daniela that she broke her commitment to Juan, her reaction is the most unexpected. In addition, the truth about Carolina's infidelity could come to light.
10	"El camino libre"	28 September 2018	0.66
Carolina seriously thinks about leaving the way free for Álvaro to go after Victoria but now she is the one who doubts her decision.
11	"Con la misma moneda"	1 October 2018	0.70
Carolina investigates the new romance of Álvaro and, for that, she is willing to go to the last consequences, but fate could pay her the same way.
12	"Juan descubre a Victoria"	2 October 2018	0.75
Juan discovers that there is something more than a friendship between Victoria and Álvaro.
13	"La peor decisión"	3 October 2018	0.73
Victoria is about to make the worst decision of her life, to marry a man she does not love.
14	"¿Renunciar al amor?"	4 October 2018	0.62
Álvaro decides to return to Carolina and renounce Victoria's love. Carolina lost her memory and does not recognize her family.
15	"Entre dos amores"	5 October 2018	0.60
Victoria has to choose between two loves and that means giving up one of them.
16	"Un nuevo amor"	8 October 2018	0.55
A new love could come to Juan's life and it may be too late for Victoria to get him back.
17	"Los celos de Juan"	9 October 2018	0.56
Juan begins to be jealous when someone approaches Susy. Clara could discover Rodrigo's secret.
18	"Debo confesarte"	10 October 2018	0.70
The truth always comes to light and both Susy and Carolina will confess their deepest secrets.
19	"Desnudar"	11 October 2018	0.74
Susy bares her feelings to Victoria about Juan. The errors are not measured, they are assumed and Marión assumes the consequences.
20	"Sal de mi vida"	12 October 2018	0.65
Victoria asks Álvaro to leave her life. Rodrigo has a new plan to end Carolina.
21	"La reconquista"	15 October 2018	0.55
Carolina is determined to reconquer Álvaro and the proposal to spend a night together sounds very tempting, while Juan wants Victoria back in his life and is willing to do anything to get her back.
22	"No rogaré más"	16 October 2018	0.60
Juan decides not to beg for Victoria's love anymore, Susana is before his eyes ready to conquer his heart.
23	"¿Me amas o desaparezco?"	17 October 2018	0.73
Álvaro is armed with courage and goes after Victoria's love, now the decision is in her hands.
24	"Amor secreto"	18 October 2018	0.66
Álvaro and Victoria decide to have a secret romance, but they are discovered by Rodrigo, who is not willing to let them be happy.
25	"Nidito de amor"	19 October 2018	0.69
After a passionate night, Álvaro and Victoria live a dreamy romance that could become a harsh reality when Clara and Rodrigo appear at the door of their love nest.
26	"La verdad de Victoria"	22 October 2018	0.56
Marion confronts Victoria about her escape with Álvaro. Carolina seeks to recover the love of her husband.
27	"Solo Juan puede ser mi papá"	23 October 2018	0.63
The pressure increases for Victoria as Dani's operation approaches. She must decide if she renounces love to save her daughter.
28	"Se acaban los secretos"	24 October 2018	0.66
Victoria's life could change in an instant when Lupita finds her embraced by Álvaro.
29	"El amor tiene consecuencias"	25 October 2018	0.70
The love between Victoria and Álvaro sweeps away what he has in his path, even with the relationship between Marión and Patricio.
30	"Una relación incómoda"	26 October 2018	0.64
Victoria's relationship with Álvaro continues to bring her problems, now it is little Dani who claims Victoria for having a relationship with a married man.
31	"El abuso"	29 October 2018	0.69
Susana's boss tries to abuse her but at that moment Juan arrives to save her.
32	"La traición de un amigo"	30 October 2018	0.62
While Alvaro builds his new love, he could be destroyed by discovering his friend's betrayal.
33	"¿Vas tú o voy yo?"	31 October 2018	0.63
Álvaro is received at Victoria's house. In addition, Cerillo confesses to Juan to be in love with Susana.
34	"En las redes de Rodrigo"	1 November 2018	0.65
Carolina falls back into Rodrigo, but at the same time he is with Clara, his wife.
35	"Renace la pasión"	2 November 2018	0.58
Carolina begins to have greater approaches with Rodrigo. Patricio still does not forgive Marión.
36	"El amor duele"	5 November 2018	0.76
Patricio breaks Marión's heart. Susana tells Cerillo the truth. Juan wants to be Susana's official boyfriend.
37	"La premiación"	6 November 2018	0.63
Victoria is about to pass a test. Álvaro invites her to live with him an important commitment but Clara crosses her path and prevents her from presenting herself.
38	"Los celos de Victoria"	7 November 2018	0.68
El Tigre asks Lupita to be his girlfriend but this time the answer could be just what he expects.
39	"Entra la espada y la pared"	8 November 2018	0.58
Victoria is between the sword and the wall when she notices that Juan is making his life with Susana and her relationship with Álvaro seems to be on the verge of ending.
40	"La sospecha"	9 November 2018	0.65
Carolina will be close to being discovered. Marión wants revenge against Patricio. Juan confesses his feelings.
41	"Un terrible momento"	12 November 2018	0.61
Marión confesses to Lupita a secret that could take her to the end of her love for El Tigre. Meanwhile, Álvaro lives a terrible moment that seems to border him at the end of his life.
42	"Una disputa de amor"	13 November 2018	0.70
Clara is about to put an end to her relationship with Rodrigo. But the dispute between Carolina and Victoria for the love of Alvaro is just beginning.
43	"Todo por amor"	14 November 2018	0.76
El Tigre is willing to make many merits for love. Victoria is willing to leave her house to take care of Alvaro.
44	"Nuestro nido de amor"	15 November 2018	0.74
Clara separates from Rodrigo. Victoria and Álvaro look for their new home. Carolina sees an opportunity to be with Rodrigo.
45	"Adiós para siempre"	16 November 2018	0.61
Juan feels that he lost Victoria forever. Clara is about to fall for Max but Rodrigo does not intend to sit idly by, he senses that his wife is with someone else.
46	"Los celos de Rodrigo"	19 November 2018	0.66
Max is threatened by Rodrigo, who warns him to stay away from Clara.
47	"Un inesperado final"	20 November 2018	0.59
Álvaro falls into a trap and Victoria surprises him with another woman. An unexpected start for Richi and Marión arrives.
48	"Con el corazón roto"	21 November 2018	0.63
Victoria's heart is broken by watching the video that a mysterious woman recorded with Álvaro.
49	"Un grave error"	22 November 2018	0.66
Clara starts a romance with Max. With an unwanted pregnancy and many doubts, Marión is about to make a serious mistake.
50	"El padre"	23 November 2018	0.63
Marión has to find out who is the father of her baby. Álvaro looks for Victoria to talk to her.
51	"Un destello de esperanza"	26 November 2018	0.69
Rodrigo, the traitor who wants to destroy Álvaro is about to be discovered.
52	"La verdad duele"	27 November 2018	0.59
Carolina discovers the secret that Patricio keeps. Victoria realizes that she would be better with Juan.
53	"Regresa el padre de Daniela"	29 November 2018	0.56
Emilia tries to convince Rodrigo to plead guilty. Daniela's father returns after many years of his abandonment.
54	"Un doloroso adiós"	30 November 2018	0.59
Max leaves, says goodbye to Clara but she has the last word. Daniela finds out that she has a brother.
55	"El secreto de Marión"	3 December 2018	0.55
Max is brutally beaten and it is very clear to him who is to blame. Lupita's maternal instinct is about to bring to light Marión's best kept secret.
56	"La inocencia de Álvaro"	4 December 2018	0.58
Daniela discovers that her newly appeared brother suffers from leukemia and that she is the only one who can save his life. Victoria finds out that Álvaro was never unfaithful.
57	"El tiempo pasa"	5 December 2018	0.57
Juan discovers a terrible betrayal of his own father. Álvaro is about to live his darkest moment, jail awaits him.
58	"Regresan Juan y Victoria"	6 December 2018	0.64
Marión's pregnancy is complicated and could put her life at risk. Álvaro reappears in Victoria's life.
59	"Una traición al descubierto"	7 December 2018	0.59
The romance between Carolina and Rodrigo comes to light, but, in addition, it is discovered by the least expected person.
60	"Una nueva oportunidad"	10 December 2018	0.64
Rodrigo thinks of conquering Susana. Álvaro already knows that Rodrigo is a traitor and goes after him.
61	"Una esposa infiel"	11 December 2018	0.55
Victoria faces Carolina and threatens to tell Álvaro that his wife cheated on him with his best friend.
62	"Seamos una familia"	12 December 2018	0.56
Max makes Clara the proposal she was waiting for. Patricio surprises Marión by offering her to start a family.
63	"La gota que derrama el vaso"	13 December 2018	0.60
Marión gives Richi an ultimatum to give her everything she thinks she deserves. Juan seems to be losing patience with Victoria.
64	"Vamos a casarnos"	14 December 2018	0.60
Susana discovers that Rodrigo is not who she believes he is and could make a dramatic decision. Victoria asks Juan for marriage.
65	"Las dudas de Juan"	17 December 2018	0.58
El Tigre is preparing to make Lupita an important proposal of love. Juan doubts the reasons why Victoria wants to marry him.
66	"Adiós para siempre"	18 December 2018	0.64
Victoria says goodbye to Alvaro forever. Richi threatens to put an end to his relationship with Marión when he discovers a painful truth.
67	"Vas a perderlo todo"	19 December 2018	N/A
Rodrigo blackmails Carolina with telling Patrick the truth. Álvaro knows Carolina a little better.
68	"¿La amas sí o no?"	20 December 2018	N/A
69	"Irás a la cárcel"	21 December 2018	N/A
70	"Patricio nunca será tu hijo"	25 December 2018	N/A
71	"Álvaro, regresa"	26 December 2018	N/A
72	"Voy a estar contigo hasta el final"	27 December 2018	N/A
73	"¿Le dirás la verdad a Patricio?"	28 December 2018	N/A
74	"Errores"	2 January 2019	N/A
75	"La verdad"	3 January 2019	N/A
76	"Cásate conmigo"	4 January 2019	0.74
77	"Un corazón para Álvaro"	7 January 2019	0.75
78	"Mi corazón no tiene tiempo"	8 January 2019	0.64
79	"El secuestro"	9 January 2019	0.72
80	"Episodio final"	10 January 2019	0.80
