= Amor amargo =

- Genre: Telenovela
- Based on: Ilha dos Amores by Maria João Mira and Diogo Horta
- Written by: Héctor Forero; Gaby Ruffo; Lenny Ferro; Óscar Ortíz de Pinedo; Carlos Arteaga
- Directed by: Juan Carlos Muñoz; Jorge Robles Sánchez; Manolo Fernández
- Starring: Daniela Romo; Andrés Palacios; Ana Belena; Arturo Peniche
- Theme music composer: Eduardo Tagle
- Opening theme: "Amor amargo" by Daniela Romo
- Ending theme: "Amor amargo" by Lizy Martínez
- Composers: Silvana Medrano; Luis Enrique González
- Country of origin: Mexico
- Original language: Spanish
- No. of seasons: 1
- No. of episodes: 82

Production
- Executive producer: Pedro Ortiz de Pinedo
- Producer: Liliana Cuesta Aguirre
- Editors: Rodrigo Lepe; Irving Rosas; Alma Hernández
- Camera setup: Multi-camera
- Production company: TelevisaUnivision

Original release
- Network: Las Estrellas
- Release: 4 November 2024 – 23 February 2025

Amor amargo (English: Bitter Love) is a Mexican telenovela produced by Pedro Ortiz de Pinedo for TelevisaUnivision. It is based on the 2007 Portuguese telenovela Ilha dos Amores, created by Maria João Mira and Diogo Horta. The series stars Daniela Romo, Andrés Palacios and Ana Belena. It aired on Las Estrellas from 4 November 2024 to 23 February 2025.

== Plot ==
Tomás is the CEO of a chain of Mexican handicraft stores and travels to Querétaro with his team to participate in one of the most important craft fairs in the country. At this event he meets Gabriela San José, an independent and self-reliant woman, who goes to the fair as an exhibitor of handicrafts made in association with a group of women entrepreneurs. When Tomás meets Gabriela, he sees the woman he has always dreamed of and decides to win her over. She sees in him the ideal man and doesn't hesitate to give him a chance. What they don't know is that Jaime, Tomás' father, was the great love of Beatriz, Gabriela's mother.

In the past, Jaime and Beatriz loved each other without measuring the consequences of social class differences and that is why Leonor San José, Beatriz's mother, was about to kill Jaime, until he had to leave town, vowing to return one day to take revenge. When Tomás and Gabriela decide that they are right for each other, they receive separate news: Beatriz has had an accident and Gabriela must return to town. When she leaves, Tomás receives a call telling him that his father suffered an accident and is dead.

At their funeral, Tomás and Gabriela learn that Jaime and Beatriz were in the same car that rolled into an abyss. Tomás and Gabriela refuse to believe that they are the children of two people who loved each other so much in the past, a past they were completely unaware of. Tomas decides that he will stay in Todos Los Santos to take revenge for his father's death. His pain becomes overwhelming and he is willing to do anything to achieve his goal, but Gabriela is in the middle of it all, since she is the granddaughter of Leonor San José, the woman Jaime hated the most and the main suspect of what happened to him.

== Cast ==
- Daniela Romo as Leonor San José
- Andrés Palacios as Tomás Jiménez
- Ana Belena as Gabriela Miranda San José
- Arturo Peniche as Enrique Olivares
- Cynthia Klitbo as Beatriz San José
- Francisco Gattorno as Jaime Jiménez
- Martha Julia as Magdalena Murray
- Alejandro Ávila as Guillermo San José
- Beatriz Moreno as Bienvenida Ruiz
- Adalberto Parra as Israel Pérez
- Lizy Martínez as Vera Olivares
- Ricardo Franco as Joaquín Ardila Robles
- Jessica Decote as Lucía de Olivares
- Karla Farfán as Miriam Miranda San José
- Karena Flores as Eva Miranda San José
- Pedro Baldo as Andrés Jiménez
- Alejandra Procuna as Dolores López
- Magda Karina as Alicia Sánchez
- Luz María Aguilar as Delirio Valdez
- Sergio Kleiner as Dr. Claudio Hernández Calvillo
- Julio Mannino as Claudio Torrijos Barraza
- Juan Ángel Esparza as Julio Martínez
- Evangelina Sosa as Martha Guerra
- Fernando Robles as Cipriano "Cheves" Ruíz
- Oscar Medellín as Francisco Carrera
- Daniel Gama as Emilio Duarte
- Federico Espejo as Marlon Smith
- Marco Uriel as Máximo San José
- Flora Fernández as Gloria Salvatierra
- Luisa Muriel as Sor Mercedes
- Arturo Posada as Paulo Martínez
- Eva Daniela as Catalina Olivares
- Italivi Orozco as Citlali Valdez
- Valeria Masini as Candela Murray
- Armando Andrade as Juan Pedro Guerra
- Alain Said as Gilberto Santos
- Rodrigo Ríos as Simón Alejandro
- Fiona Osio as Lisa Huerta
- Vanessa López as Minerva Guerra
- Julia Arce as Cleo
- Lorena Meritano as Ofelia Saldívar

== Production ==
On 10 June 2024, it was reported that Pedro Ortiz de Pinedo had begun casting for the female protagonist of his next telenovela, titled Amor amargo, with Andrés Palacios, Martha Julia and Valeria Masini being confirmed as part of the cast. On 15 July 2024, Ana Belena was confirmed as the female protagonist, with Daniela Romo and Arturo Peniche cast as the antagonists of the story. Filming began on 31 July 2024, with the rest of the cast being announced as well.

== Ratings ==
Viewership and ratings per season of Amor amargo
Season	Timeslot (CT)	Episodes	First aired		Last aired		Avg. viewers (millions)
Season	Timeslot (CT)	Episodes	Date	Viewers (millions)	Date	Viewers (millions)	Avg. viewers (millions)
1	Mon–Fri 6:30 p.m.	19	4 November 2024	2.27	23 February 2025	4.08	1.97

== Episodes ==
No.	Title	Original release date	Mexico viewers (millions)
1	"El amor perdura en la eternidad"	4 November 2024 (Note: Premiered early online through Las Estrellas website on 1 November 2024.)	2.27
In 1989, Leonor is opposed to Beatriz and Jaime's love because he belongs to a lower class than her family and is willing to do anything to separate them. In present day, Tomás sees Gabriela on the street and recognizes her as the same woman who has invaded his dreams night after night. Tomás loses Gabriela in the elevator, but she gets stuck and he manages to save her from an accident. Thanks to Alicia's confession, Beatriz realizes that Jaime never stopped loving her and is happy to see him again after so long apart.
2	"Eres la mujer que siempre soñé"	5 November 2024	2.27
Gabriela asks Francisco to respect their agreement to separate in order to stop hurting each other as a couple. Tomás organizes a romantic dinner for his date with Gabriela, assuring her that what he feels for her is different from all his other relationships. Beatriz complains to Leonor for interfering in her relationship with Jaime assuring her that it is the last time they will be face to face. Cheves finds Jaime's car and makes sure to fulfill Leonor's order by pushing him into the ravine.
3	"Es la peor venganza de toda"	6 November 2024	N/A
Gabriela introduces Tomás as her boyfriend to get rid of Francisco, which Tomás overhears and is happy to hear it. Leonor assures that Beatriz's death is part of Jaime's revenge and vows to make him pay by destroying his legacy forever. Emilio confirms Jaime's death and is forced to tell Tomás the news. Tomás overhears Leonor speaking ill of Jaime and confronts her, demanding that she respect his father's memory; he discovers that Gabriela is the granddaughter of his new enemy.
4	"Que la ira de Dios caiga"	7 November 2024	2.10
Leonor raises Gabriela's suspicions when she forbids her to see Tomás again. Leonor asks Israel for details about Beatriz's death for fear of having her own daughter's blood on her hands. Eva blames Leonor for Beatriz's death by throwing in her face that she killed her own husband. Vera takes her chance to approach Tomás with the intention of making him fall in love and seize his fortune.
5	"¡Que empiece la guerra!"	8 November 2024	1.95
Tomás asks Gabriela for help to discover the truth about the death of their parents and to be able to get justice. Gabriela confronts Leonor to explain the past between Beatriz and Jaime and to discover the truth about their death. Tomás refuses to give in to Leonor's threats and decides to carry out Jaime's revenge. Tomás confronts Leonor to take control of the factory from her, but she reveals that Gabriela is the new director.
6	"La reina de este pueblo"	11 November 2024	1.95
Gabriela is disappointed in Tomás when she learns that he is not interested in helping the factory, but in taking it over. Leonor seeks the help of Enrique and Francisco to confront Tomás from the professional and personal side. Now that Gabriela is in charge of the factory, Tomás asks Emilio and Marlon for help to take revenge against Leonor, but without ending up hurting Gabriela. Vera warns Tomás about the bad reputation Gabriela has earned with the men in her life.
7	"La maldad te acecha"	12 November 2024	1.88
The police search for the identity of the woman who met Jaime and Beatriz at the restaurant hoping she can help them discover the truth about their death. Gabriela doesn't know who she should support, whether the love she feels for Tomás or the hatred that rules Leonor's life. Magdalena organizes a dinner to get closer to her stepchildren, but they despise her, suspecting her true intentions. Francisco, Enrique and Guillermo point out to Gabriela their unconditional support to move the factory forward and avoid its sale.
8	"No cruces los límites"	13 November 2024	1.68
Gabriela shows Leonor that unlike the rest of her family, she will not allow anyone to try to control her life. Tomás confesses to Gabriela that Leonor had already tried to kill Jaime to keep him away from Beatriz. Tomás shows Gabriela evidence that Jaime and Beatriz were together when they died, ruining Leonor's accusations. Gabriela tells Leonor that thanks to Tomás she confirmed that she cannot trust her to find the truth about Beatriz's death.
9	"Tu enojo no es el mío"	14 November 2024	2.12
Miriam begs Gabriela to be careful with Tomás, as she continues to believe that like his father, he is a dangerous man. Vera offers Francisco the chance to work together to keep Tomás and Gabriela apart and to win them over. Gabriela realizes that Leonor wants to take advantage of her relationship with Tomás to settle the company's debt in a way that suits the San José family better. Bienvenida manages to prevent Leonor from getting rid of the collection of love letters that Jaime had written to Beatriz 35 years ago and gives them to Gabriela.
10	"Quiero perderme contigo"	15 November 2024	1.76
Joaquín interrogates Enrique about Jaime's attack the night he died and realizes that his version of events does not coincide with Vera's version. Enrique confesses his resentment towards Beatriz for rejecting him and Leonor suspects that he had something to do with her daughter's death. Despite having no evidence of fraud, Gabriela confirms that the city distributor is responsible for the crisis at the factory. Gabriela takes advantage of the trip to the city to ask Tomás to spend the night with her.
11	"Vamos a tocar el cielo y las nubes"	18 November 2024	1.73
Eva is frightened when she sees the fire in Tomás' office, but decides to face her fear when she realizes that Andrés is in the middle of the flames. Tomás and Gabriela wake up early, as he has organized a balloon trip to the pyramids of Teotihuacán. In the middle of the trip, Tomás asks Gabriela to be his girlfriend and they decide to seal their love with the same ring that Jaime gave Beatriz. Leonor receives Eva's necklace and remembers that her granddaughter used to start fires when she was a child, information that could be useful to her someday.
12	"Todos me mienten"	19 November 2024	1.95
Guillermo gets rid of the evidence of his frauds to prevent Gabriela from discovering him, but he didn't expect Beatriz having more than one backup. Leonor is horrified to see in Gabriela's hands the same ring with which Beatriz swore never to see her again and demands that she take it off as if it had a curse on it. Gabriela threatens Leonor with resigning from the company unless they agree to close the company's offices in the capital. Vera advises Enrique to join the search for Andrés to make people believe in his innocence for the fire at the offices.
13	"Ni se te ocurra gritar"	20 November 2024	N/A
Leonor accuses Eva of having set the fire that took her grandfather's life in order to blame her for the attack on Tomás' offices. Magdalena insists to Emilio to see if he already knows what percentage of Jaime's fortune she is entitled to according to his will. Leonor plays with matches to force Eva to admit her guilt in the fire. Dolores manages to convince Tomás that the fire is nothing more than revenge by the San José family for Beatriz's death.
14	"Un culpable para el incendio"	21 November 2024	1.71
Thanks to Dolores' complaint, the police issue an arrest warrant for Eva for setting fire to Tomás' offices. Vera demands that Enrique make Leonor pay for having dared to attack her. Gabriela seeks Leonor's help to get Eva out of jail, but she refuses to abuse her power over the town. Vera's plan takes effect and she makes Tomás see that Gabriela is working with Enrique to separate them.
15	"Estás cegado por tu venganza"	22 November 2024	2.01
Gabriela visits Andrés hoping that he will remember what happened in the fire, since only he can prove Eva's innocence. Leonor warns Miriam to stay away from Juan Pedro or she will end up just like Eva, in jail. Tomás realizes that Eva is imprisoned because of Leonor and asks for Gabriela's help to find the truth.
16	"Nadie condena a un enfermo mental"	25 November 2024	2.08
Leonor is willing to get Eva out of jail as long as she admits that she caused her grandfather's death thanks to a mental illness. Tomás meets Leonor at the hospital and publicly accuses her of having caused the fire that almost cost Andrés his life. Leonor wonders about Máximo's eternal rest as she recalls how she exacted revenge on him for a life of abuse. Candela seeks Tomás' help, as she has not seen Magdalena all day and begins to fear that something has happened to her.
17	"¡Es un corrupto!"	26 November 2024	2.05
Julio claims in front of everyone in the bar that he is the one who set the fire in Tomás' offices. Tomás arrives to his meeting with Gabriela, but Leonor confronts him, blaming him for risking Eva's life by denouncing her. Joaquín reveals to Tomás that he has enough evidence to prove that Eva did not set the fire and thanks to her, Andrés is still alive. Torrijos is willing to do anything to follow Leonor's orders and keep Eva behind bars, including arresting Tomás to prevent him from filing the complaint.
18	"Termina tu venganza"	27 November 2024	1.76
Eva confesses to Tomás what really happened the day of the fire and warns him that they were only victims of a trap. Leonor orders Torrijas to look for evidence that blames Julio for the fire in order to free Eva from jail. Gabriela breaks up with Tomás to make way for him to get his revenge on Leonor. Tomás interrogates Julio to discover his role in the fire and is willing to help him get out of jail in exchange for information.
19	"Llevas la pobreza en tus venas"	28 November 2024	N/A
Leonor visits Tomás to make fun of the trouble he is in and warn him that the town will always do what she orders. Now that Andrés is out of danger, Simón asks him to enter the godparent program at the orphanage to almost become a family. Despite what Francisco had told her, Gabriela realizes that he never got over his love for her. Gabriela suddenly faints, leaving her at the mercy of whatever Francisco decides to do with her.
20	"Leonor es pariente de un demonio"	29 November 2024	1.70
Leonor orders the release of Tomás and Torrijos complies, but makes sure to give him a beating. Julio threatens Magdalena with telling Tomás the whole truth unless she does everything necessary to get him out of jail. Guillermo opens Miriam's eyes to Leonor's true intention behind all her actions. Enrique visits Julio to prevent Tomás from freeing him and threatens him to start working as one of his accomplices.
21	"La locura es parte de la vida"	2 December 2024	N/A
Tomás realizes that Leonor's only reason for getting him out of jail early is for him to discover that Gabriela spent the night with Francisco. Knowing that Tomás is single, Vera seeks him out to get closer to him and help him forget Gabriela. Bienvenida confesses to Gabriela and Miriam that despite being married, Beatriz was never as happy as when she was with Jaime.
22	"Leonor actúa debajo del agua"	3 December 2024	2.13
Gabriela realizes that everything Leonor says is just manipulation so that everyone will obey her without question. Tomás visits Gabriela willing to take her home knowing that Leonor would never dare to show her wickedness in front of her granddaughters. Leonor assures Gabriela that Jaime is the only one to blame for the economic problems the factory has been suffering. Taking advantage of Jaime's birthday, Andrés asks Tomás to stop risking his life fighting against Leonor.
23	"Quiero ser tu cupido"	4 December 2024	2.07
Eva reveals to Gabriela that she is beginning to have feelings for Andrés. Andrés decides to stop supporting Tomás unconditionally because of the damage he and Leonor caused Eva with their revenge. Tomás visits Eva in the hospital and shares with her how he feels about Gabriela. Enrique is afraid that Bienvenida will discover who is behind his brother's death.
24	"De las dos, ¿quién es peor?"	5 December 2024	N/A
Enrique convinces Leonor to get rid of her doubts about the way Beatriz and Jaime died. Guillermo decides to join forces with Francisco to help him avoid Enrique's jealousy. Gabriela threatens Leonor with selling her shares in the company if she sends Eva to a psychiatric hospital.
25	"Quiero cambiar de estrategia"	6 December 2024	N/A
Tomás instructs Gil to take charge of rebuilding Gabriela's secret garden, filling it with her favorite flowers. Magdalena warns Magdalena warns Dolores that if she says anything about her blackmail, she will reveal that her husband is to blame for Tomás and Andrés not having a mother. Tomás decides to cancel the factory debt in exchange for becoming a partner in the company. Andrés confesses his love to Eva and she decides to kiss him in return.
26	"Voy a ser tu condena"	9 December 2024	N/A
Leonor suspects that Guillermo and Carmen are behind the factory's economic problems. After learning of Beatriz's terrible end, Gabriela fears that her love will also lead Tomás to his grave. Tomás asks Guillermo to betray his family and become his spy in all factory affairs. Gabriela threatens Enrique with finding the person responsible for Beatriz's death and he will suffer the worst of fates.
27	"El dueño absoluto"	10 December 2024	N/A
Tomás offers Leonor to forgive the factory debt in exchange for shares in the company. Guillermo confesses that thanks to his family's contempt, he was forced to accept Tomás' job offer. Bienvenida learns that Leonor pays Israel very well for doing "special favors" for her. Eva realizes that among the Jiménez family, only Magdalena could be guilty for Beatriz's death.
28	"Un mensaje de tu mamá"	11 December 2024	N/A
Tomás refuses to listen to Gabriela's reasons for separating, because he is willing to pay the same price for her as his father. Gabriela, Miriam and Eva find Beatriz's diary and recover the inspiration to dare to love. With a letter, Tomás guides Gabriela to the secret garden he had planned thanks to Eva's help. Leonor begins to suspect that Israel was more involved than she thought in Beatriz and Jaime's death.
29	"¿Estaré haciendo lo correcto?"	12 December 2024	N/A
Andrés finishes the paperwork to fulfill Simón's dream of having someone who cares about him. Tomás is surprised to see that Gabriela supports Francisco to prevent the argument from ending in tragedy. Gabriela searches Beatriz's diary for a sign that tells her whether she should stay away from Tomás or hold on to him. Leonor discovers the bouquet of lisianthus in her office and is furious to the point of wanting to end the life of the person responsible.
30	"Yo juego a ganar"	13 December 2024	N/A
Being the only one who could have gotten the flowers, Gabriela believes that Tomás sent them to Leonor as revenge. Knowing that she has a boyfriend, Joaquín confesses to Miriam that he is in love with her and asks her for a chance to be more than just friends. Enrique reveals to Vera that he has always wanted to be a partner in the factory and thanks to the economic crisis the company is going through, he will have the opportunity to be the sole owner. Vera prepares everything to make Tomás fall in love with her from the first date.
31	"El coche de El Tiburón"	16 December 2024	N/A
Believing that it was a trap set by Francisco, Tomás summons Gabriela to the same place as Vera to show her that no one will separate them. Gabriela begins to suspect that everyone is keeping a secret from her when she learns about the beauty of the woman who used to sell the lisianthus in town. Bienvenida reveals to Gabriela that the only reason Beatriz took off Jaime's ring is when someone revealed that she was expecting his child. Eva realizes that Miriam is beginning to have feelings for Joaquín and decides to help her forget about her love for Juan Pedro.
32	"Las cosas se harán a mi manera"	17 December 2024	N/A
Francisco is ready to end Tomás' life to blame Leonor, but Vera warns him that he belongs to her. Gabriela puts Enrique and Leonor in their place by making sure that she has the final say in all the company's decisions. Gabriela throws in Leonor's face Enrique's intentions to take over the factory without her realizing it. Tomás receives a floral wreath and Guillermo assures him that they are from Leonor.
33	"Una vida lejos de aquí"	18 December 2024	N/A
Andrés doesn't forget Simón and takes him to his dates with Eva to let her know that he is part of his family. Tomás accepts the proposal of a partnership with Leonor without caring about the risk of losing money. Leonor learns that Tomás proposed to Gabriela to get out of town and feels bad. Andrés doesn't keep quiet and confronts Magdalena with the suspicion that she is to blame for Jaime's death.
34	"Me regresas el pañuelo"	19 December 2024	N/A
While flipping through a family album, Miriam discovers that Leonor crossed out her grandfather's face, erasing him from her story. Andrés and Eva get together to give Simón the first gift he has ever received. Gabriela finds her handkerchief on the bed and fearfully looks for Tomás believing it is a farewell. Leonor learns of Gabriela's secret garden and upon confirming it, she again suffers the betrayal of her late husband with the florist.
35	"Aborrezco lo que me haces sentir"	20 December 2024	N/A
Bienvenida reproaches Leonor for the sadness she caused Beatriz for separating her from Jaime. Julio learns that Magdalena received part of her inheritance and hurries to demand his share for making her a widow. Leonor warns Gabriela that the flower garden that Tomás gave her is just another attack to weaken her and take everything from her. Francisco decides to ignore his psychiatrist's recommendations and drinks to give free rein to his feelings.
36	"Larga vida para el Chocolate San José"	23 December 2024	N/A
Vera tries to get Francisco to react after he tried to kiss Gabriela and wants to turn him against her. Vera discovers Enrique's suspicious attitude towards Paulo and decides to follow the latter until she finds him in Francisco's office. Vera tries to unmask Paulo and threatens to reveal everything she knows about him and Enrique if he does not take her side. Tomás appears during the celebration of Chocolate San José and toasts to the new business partners.
37	"Leonor no podrá caminar más"	24 December 2024	N/A
Enrique confronts Tomás for showing up at the company celebration and the argument comes to blows. Leonor begins to feel bad after Enrique's argument with Tomás and at the hospital she says goodbye to Gabriela. Enrique doesn't intend to stay idle after the argument with Tomás and takes his truck and tries to run him over. Gabriela is informed that Leonor suffered a cerebral episode that left her unable to walk.
38	"Le voy a dar en donde más le duele"	25 December 2024	N/A
Leonor questions Eva about her relationship with Tomás' brother, but she defends Andrés even though her grandmother doesn't like him. A hooded person follows Gabriela's steps, puts her to sleep and takes her away. Enrique has a strong argument with Vera and slaps her, she swears to take revenge for his action. Vera arrives at the place where Gabriela is and gives her a substance to drink that puts her at risk.
39	"¿Dónde estás, Gabriela?"	26 December 2024	N/A
Bienvenida discovers that Gabriela didn't sleep at home and immediately alerts everyone to find her location. Enrique receives a call announcing Gabriela's disappearance and Vera confirms that her plans came to fruition. Leonor is worried about Gabriela's disappearance and demands to leave the hospital to look for her, despite her health condition. Francisco confronts Vera because he suspects that she knows Gabriela's whereabouts, but the argument escalates.
40	"Pactar con el enemigo"	27 December 2024	N/A
Leonor confronts Francisco because she believes he is behind Gabriela's disappearance, this after learning about his background. Enrique and his men try to get the truth out of Francisco about Gabriela's disappearance, but he knows nothing. Francisco follows Vera's steps and discovers that she has kidnapped Gabriela. In view of the situation, Vera decides to murder him. Tomás looks for Leonor to ask her to forget about their problems and join forces to find Gabriela.
41	"Nadie sale, nadie entra"	30 December 2024	N/A
42	"¡Apareció la señorita Gabriela!"	31 December 2024	N/A
43	"Busque otro culpable"	1 January 2025	N/A
44	"¿Qué fue lo que pasó con Marlon?"	2 January 2025	N/A
45	"¿Qué te hizo Marlon?"	3 January 2025	N/A
46	"Tú y yo ya no estamos juntos"	6 January 2025	N/A
47	"El arte de la guerra se basa en el engaño"	7 January 2025	N/A
48	"Tomás ya es pasado"	8 January 2025	N/A
49	"Cuentas claras, amistades largas"	9 January 2025	N/A
50	"Son una bola de mentirosos"	10 January 2025	N/A
51	"Las cosas no son lo que parecen"	13 January 2025	N/A
52	"El padre que yo conocí"	14 January 2025	N/A
53	"¡Yo estoy con Tomás!"	15 January 2025	N/A
54	"Tengo asegurada la victoria"	16 January 2025	N/A
55	"Lárgate de este pueblo"	17 January 2025	N/A
56	"Nadie está por encima de mí"	20 January 2025	N/A
57	"Un peligro para la familia"	21 January 2025	N/A
58	"Somos el uno para el otro"	22 January 2025	N/A
59	"Conmigo nadie se mete"	23 January 2025	N/A
60	"Eva dice la verdad"	24 January 2025	N/A
61	"¿Dónde está Eva?"	27 January 2025	N/A
62	"No me busques"	28 January 2025	N/A
63	"Veo sangre en mis manos"	29 January 2025	N/A
64	"¡Yo no soy mi mamá!"	30 January 2025	N/A
65	"Esto se llama traición"	31 January 2025	N/A
66	"No tengo nada que perder"	3 February 2025	N/A
67	"Besas delicioso"	4 February 2025	N/A
68	"Lucía sabe demasiado"	5 February 2025	N/A
69	"Subestimaste a las mujeres"	6 February 2025	N/A
70	"El lugar que me merezco"	7 February 2025	N/A
71	"La hacienda se convirtió en su cárcel"	10 February 2025	N/A
72	"Romper las ataduras del pasado"	11 February 2025	N/A
73	"Te voy a destrozar"	12 February 2025	N/A
74	"Enrique Olivares es el culpable"	13 February 2025	N/A
75	"No hay enemigo pequeño"	14 February 2025	N/A
76	"Una prisión de odio"	17 February 2025	N/A
77	"El calvario que mereces"	18 February 2025	N/A
78	"Tengo un heredero"	19 February 2025	N/A
79	"¡Mataste a tu hijo!"	20 February 2025	N/A
80	"Usted mató a su hija"	21 February 2025	N/A
81	"He muerto tantas veces..."	23 February 2025	4.08
82	"Decido acabar esta guerra"	23 February 2025	4.08
