= Laura G =

Mexican television presenter and journalist

- Born: María Sonia Laura González Martínez; 28 June 1985 (age 41); Monterrey, Nuevo León, Mexico
- Education: Monterrey Institute of Technology and Higher Education
- Occupations: Presenter, journalist
- Career
- Show: "En Cabina con Laura G"
- Station: La Mejor
- Website: Official website

María Sonia Laura González Martínez (born 28 June 1985), better known as Laura G, is a Mexican television presenter and journalist.

== Biography ==
Laura G began her career at age 13, hosting a children's program called Entre Chavos on TV Azteca Monterrey. In Monterrey, she was also a host of the Multimedios shows TvTu and La Hora G. She earned a degree in Communication Sciences from the Monterrey Institute of Technology and Higher Education.

In 2008, she began working at Televisa as a reporter on the program Hoy. In 2009, she became known at the national level as host of the morning news show Primero Noticias. During that time, she co-hosted Los 10 Primeros with Cecilia Galliano and Omar Chaparro, and a year later (October 2010), she was invited to co-host the Saturday variety show Sabadazo (which later became a nighttime show and the predecessor for Los 10 Primeros). She was reunited with actors Omar Chaparro, Cecilia Galliano, Alma Cero and Lorena de la Garza, until the former left around 2011.

Around 2011 she was involved in a scandal at Primero Noticias, directed by Carlos Loret de Mola, and eventually had to leave the show.

On the program Domingazo, during a 2011 tribute to Mario "Cantinflas" Moreno, she was attacked by a heifer. She initially feared for her physical safety but in the end had no major consequences.

In 2012, she premiered the program Ke Krees on the radio station KeBuena. In the same year she had a small part in chapter 3 of the third season of La familia P. Luche.

In 2014 she hosted the Zona Ruda program of Canal 5's PM Bar. The same year she appeared as a guest doing a sketch on the program Estrella2.

In 2016 she led the Sunday program Me enseñas... ¡y ganamos! that aired at 10 am on 15 May on Las Estrellas, where three schools and special guests come on, as well as Don Apolinar, a puppet that assists in giving the right answers.

In 2018, Laura G confirmed that she would be working on the TV Azteca program entitled El club de Eva beginning on 15 January. Later, she hosted the miscellaneous entertainment and cooking program Todo un show, along with the young host Roger González, the singer, actress and YouTuber Cynthia Rodriguez and the Argentine actor and host Fernando del Solar, with whom later, in 2019, she would join the panel of the TV Azteca morning show, Venga la alegría.

In 2023, Laura left the morning show and the channel due to contracts.

At the moment, she focuses on her social media accounts and on her La Mejor radio show En Cabina con Laura G.
