= Ana Belena =

Mexican actress

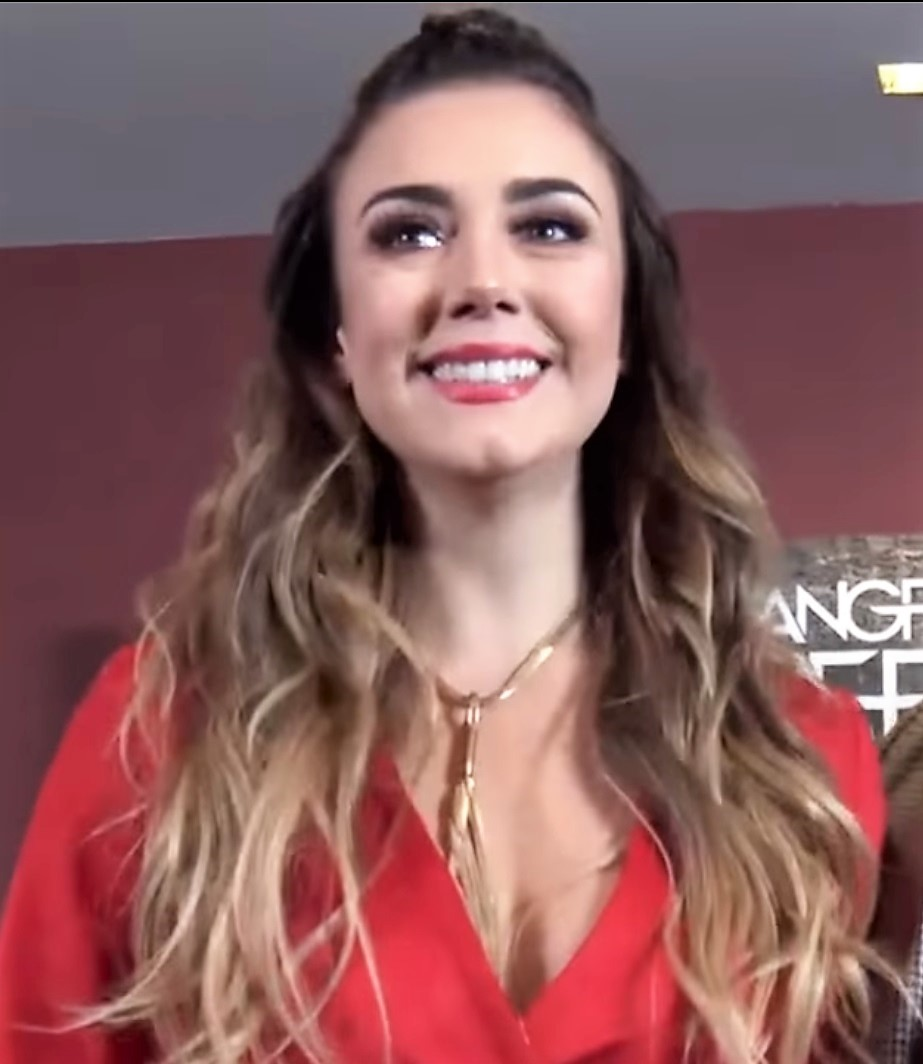
- Belena interviewed by Dulce Osuna in 2017
- Born: Ana Belena Fernández; January 10, 1988 (age 38); Mexico City, Distrito Federal, Mexico
- Occupation: Actress

Ana Belena Fernández (born January 10, 1988) is a Mexican actress and model, known for her roles in telenovelas. She studied acting in Centro de Formacion Actoral of TV Azteca in 2006.

== Filmography ==
Television
Year	Title	Role	Notes
2025	Amanecer	Atocha Carranza	Main cast
2024	Amor amargo	Gabriela Miranda San José	Lead role
2023	El maleficio	Nora Alarcón	Main cast
2022	Corona de lágrimas	Fernanda Varela	Main cast (season 2)
2021	Diseñando tu amor	Helena Vargas Reyna	Lead role
2018-2019	La Taxista	Victoria Martínez Contreras	Lead role
2017-2018	Sangre de mi tierra	Aurora Castañeda Paredes	Lead role
2014-2015	UEPA! Un escenario para amar	Alexandra Williams	Main cast
2013	Hombre Tenías que Ser	Aura Medina	Recurring role
2012	Los Rey	Julia Mariscal	Recurring role
2011-2012	Huérfanas	Aralia Sotomayor Allende	Lead role
2010	La Loba	Felicia Irigoyen Nahman	Main cast
2009	Eternamente Tuya	Tania	Recurring role
2008	Tengo todo excepto a ti	Jacqueline "Jackie" Blaquier	Lead role
2007	Bellezas indomables	Julieta Lorosqui	Recurring role
