= Las tontas no van al cielo =

Television series

- Genre: Telenovela
- Screenplay by: Enrique Torres; Palmira Olguín; Miguel Vega
- Story by: Enrique Torres
- Directed by: Rodrigo Hernández; Felipe Nájera
- Creative directors: Anabella del Boca; Florencio Zavala
- Starring: Jaime Camil; Jacqueline Bracamontes; Valentino Lanús; Sabine Moussier; Julio Alemán; Manuel "Flaco" Ibáñez
- Music by: Carlos Páramo
- Opening theme: "Esto Es Lo Que Soy" performed by Jesse & Joy
- Country of origin: Mexico
- Original language: Spanish
- No. of episodes: 140

Production
- Executive producer: Rosy Ocampo
- Producer: Eduardo Meza
- Production locations: Mexico City; Acapulco; Tlaquepaque
- Cinematography: Gabriel Vázquez Bulman; Alejandro Álvarez Ceniceros
- Editors: Norma Ramirez; Carolina López
- Camera setup: Multi-camera
- Production company: Televisa

Original release
- Network: Canal de las Estrellas
- Release: February 11 – August 22, 2008

Related
- Yo amo a Juan Querendón; Un gancho al corazón

Las tontas no van al cielo (Spanish pronunciation: [las ˈtontas no ˈβan al ˈsjelo], English title: Dumb Girls Don't Go to Heaven, Lit: Bimbos Don't Go to Heaven) is a Mexican telenovela produced by Rosy Ocampo for Televisa in 2008.

On 11 February 2008, Canal de las Estrellas started broadcasting Las tontas no van al cielo weekdays at 8:00pm, replacing Yo amo a Juan Querendón. The last episode was broadcast on 22 August 2008 with Un gancho al corazón replacing it the following day. In the United States, Univision started broadcasting Las tontas no van al cielo on December 1, 2008, replacing Querida enemiga.

Jacqueline Bracamontes, Jaime Camil and Valentino Lanús starred as protagonists, while Karla Álvarez, Fabiola Campomanes and Sabine Moussier starred as antagonists. The leading actors were Manuel "Flaco" Ibáñez, Silvia Mariscal, Julio Alemán and Ana Bertha Espín.

== Plot ==
Cándida "Candy" Morales Alcalde is a beautiful young girl filled with dreams and hopes for her future. At her 15th birthday party she meets the man of her dreams – Patricio Molina Lizárraga, who later becomes her husband. On the day of their wedding, Candy finds out that Patricio cheated on her with her sister, Alicia. Angry and hurt, she leaves him and goes to Guadalajara with her uncle, Manuel. She decides to fake her death to her family and Patricio to start a new life. Later she realizes that she is pregnant with Patricio's child. Her newborn son is what gives her hope for the future, and he becomes the reason she lives.

Meanwhile, Santiago López Carmona, a plastic surgeon, tries to build a family with his career-driven wife, Paulina. She leaves him with their daughter, Rocio, and he becomes highly disappointed in love. Therefore, he begins to sleep with many different women without making any emotional connection with them. When he meets Candy, he is determined to romance her in order to take her to bed, but he quickly discovers how special she really is and falls in love with her.

Though they first dislike each other, as time passes, Candy takes a liking to Santiago and attempts to have a relationship with him. However, this becomes difficult when their children and their exes do everything in their power to prevent their happiness.

== Cast ==
=== Main ===
- Jaime Camil as Santiago "Santy" López Carmona
- Jacqueline Bracamontes as Cándida "Candy" Morales Alcalde de Molina
- Valentino Lanús as Patricio "Pato" Molina Lizárraga
- Sabine Moussier as Marissa de la Parra
- Fabiola Campomanes as Alicia Morales Alcalde
- Karla Álvarez as Paulina "Pau" Cervantes de López-Carmona
- Julio Alemán as Arturo Molina
- Manuel "Flaco" Ibáñez as Manuel "Meño" Morales
- Ana Bertha Espín as Gregoria "Goya" Alcalde Vda. de Morales
- Silvia Mariscal as Isabel Vda. de López Carmona

=== Supporting ===
- Mauricio Herrera as Jaime Martínez
- Rosángela Balbó as Margarita Lizárraga de Molina
- Alejandro Ibarra as Eduardo All
- Andrea Torre as Soledad Romero
- Jackie Garcia as Rosario "Chayo" de All
- Carlos de la Mota as Raúl de la Parra
- Luis Manuel Ávila as Carlos "Frijolito" Zamora
- Reynaldo Rossaldo as Antonio "Toño" "Lentejita"
- Julio Vega as Donato
- Raquel Garza as Hortensia
- Lili Brillanti as Tina
- Gaby Platas as Bárbara
- Ginny Hoffman as Cecilia
- Erik Guecha as Carlo
- Christina Pastor as Lourdes "Lulú" Robledo
- Violeta Isfel as Lucía López-Carmona
- Eleazar Gómez as Charlie Morales
- Robin Vega as Salvador "Chava" Molina Morales
- Diego Ramirez as Alberto "Beto" Molina Romero
- Mariana Lodoza as Rocío "Chio" López-Carmona Cervantes
- Ivette Cordovez as Paty

Special participation

- Allisson Lozz as Milagros Belmonte Ramos
- Laura Flores as Luciana Arango
- Arlette Pacheco as Laura de Morales
- Agustín Arana as Mario Landazuri
- Ximena Herrera as Irene
- Marco Uriel as Héctor
- Rafael del Villar as Jorge
- Viviana Ramos as Evangelina
- Mario Casillas as Clemente Morales
- Georgina Domínguez as Elianis

== Awards ==
Year	Award	Category	Nominee	Result
2009	27th TVyNovelas Awards	Best Actress	Jacqueline Bracamontes	Nominated
2009	27th TVyNovelas Awards	Best Leading Actress	Ana Bertha Espín	Nominated
2009	27th TVyNovelas Awards	Best Leading Actor	Manuel "Flaco" Ibáñez	Won
2009	27th TVyNovelas Awards	Best Young Lead Actor	Eleazar Gómez	Won
2009	27th TVyNovelas Awards	Best Female Revelation	Violeta Isfel	Nominated
