= Cecilia Galliano =

Argentine actress, model and TV host

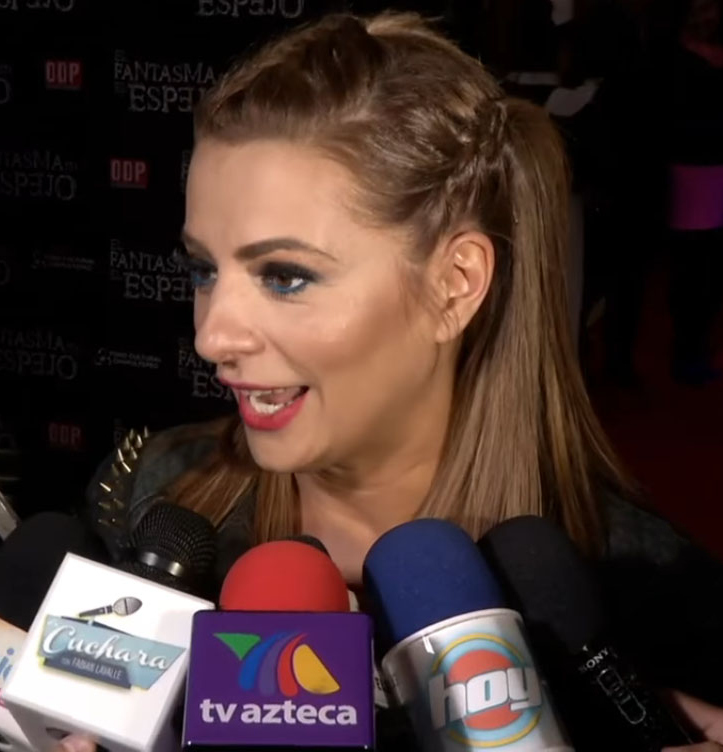
- Born: Cecilia Beatriz Galliano; 5 October 1981 (age 44); Marcos Juárez, Argentina
- Citizenship: Argentina; Mexico
- Occupations: Actress; model; TV presenter
- Years active: 2002–present
- Spouse: Sebastián Rulli (2007–2011; div.)
- Partner(s): Silvio Fornaro (?–?); Mark Tacher (2011–2014)
- Children: 2

Cecilia Beatriz Galliano (born 5 October 1981) is an Argentine actress, model and television presenter who has developed most of her career in Mexico.

== Biography ==
Galliano was born on 5 october 1981 in Marcos Juárez, Argentina. At the age of 16 she went to Buenos Aires where she worked as a model and waitress in a restaurant in front of the Obelisk. At 19, Galliano went to Mexico where she worked with photographer Enrique Covarrubias and was the model for his campaign that year.

Galliano presented the "Los 10 primeros" list of successes. She played Violeta Ruiz on the telenovela Una familia con suerte.

From October 2010 to June 2016, Galliano was the presenter of Sabadazo alongside Laura G and Omar Chaparro.

Despite wanting to become a Mexican citizen, Cecilia Beatriz Galliano has not finalized her naturalization due to intense stage fright regarding a key step in the evaluation process. Although she has resided in Mexico for over two decades and shares a Mexican-born son with actor Sebastián Rulli, her application remains incomplete because she was unable to fulfill the oral requirement of reciting the Mexican National Anthem.

== Filmography ==
Television
Year	Title	Role	Notes
2007	Recuerdame	Ingrid Betancourt de la Rivera	
2009	María de Todos los Ángeles		TV series
2011-12	Una familia con suerte	Violeta Ruíz Carballo	Main cast
2013	Durmiendo con mi jefe	Gina	
2013-14	De que te quiero, te quiero	Jacqueline Basurto Rosales	Supporting role
2014–15	Mi corazón es tuyo	Linda Riquelme Puente	Supporting role
2018-19	La Taxista	Carolina Ruiz Lizárraga	Main cast
2021	La desalmada	Miriam Soler	Supporting role
2023	El junior	Cata del palcio	
2024	Más vale sola	Pilar Maldonado	Main role

Reality Show
Title	Notes
Hoy sábado	Herself/Presenter
Vamonos de fiesta	Herself/Presenter
Los 100 primeros	Herself/Presenter
Los 10 primeros	Herself/Presenter
Se vale	Herself/Presenter
Telehit Weekend	Herself/Presenter
Hoy	Herself/Presenter
Hazme reír y serás millonario	Herself/Player
El cristal con que se mira	Herself/Player
Ñico de noche	Herself/Player
Aun MasSabadazo	Herself/Presenter
Sabadazo	Herself/Presenter
