= Anabel Ochoa =

Spanish writer and psychiatrist

Anabel Ochoa (1955–2008) was a Spanish writer and psychiatrist.
