= Tormenta en el paraíso =

- Created by: Caridad Bravo Adams
- Written by: Marcia del Río; Claudia Velazco
- Directed by: Aurelio Ávila; Gilberto Macin
- Starring: Sara Maldonado; Erick Elías; Mariana Seoane; Alejandro Tommasi
- Theme music composer: Gian Marco Zignago
- Opening theme: No Se Me Hace Fácil by Alejandro Fernández
- Ending theme: Atrévete a mirarme de frente by Mariana Seoane
- Country of origin: Mexico
- Original language: Spanish
- No. of episodes: 185

Production
- Executive producer: Juan Osorio
- Cinematography: Alfredo Sánchez
- Editor: Arturo Rodríguez
- Running time: 45 minutes
- Production company: Televisa

Original release
- Network: Canal de las Estrellas
- Release: November 12, 2007 – July 25, 2008

Tormenta en el paraíso (English: Storm over Paradise) is a Mexican telenovela produced by Juan Osorio for Televisa. The telenovela premiered on Canal de las Estrellas on November 12, 2007 and ended on July 25, 2008. It stars Sara Maldonado, Erick Elías, Mariana Seoane and Alejandro Tommasi.

== Plot ==
In 1519, a Mayan priest, Ahzac, discovers that his daughter Ixmy has fallen in love with a white foreigner. He plans to sacrifice her as a gift to the gods, along with items made of gold and a black pearl. Ixmy avoids her fate, and Ahzac curses the black pearl: "Whoever has this pearl in their possession will never be able to know what happiness is!"

In 1987, Eliseo Bravo and Hernán Lazcano explore the coral reefs of Cozumel and discover the black pearl. When Hernán touches the pearl, Ahzac's curse takes effect. Eliseo's greed leads to Hernán's death, leaving his wife Analy to raise their newborn daughter Aymar alone.

Nineteen years later, Aymar Lazcano is a beautiful young woman. Aymar meets and falls in love with Nicolás Bravo. After her mother is murdered by a jealous old suitor of hers, Aymar lives with a family friend Pablo Solis.

Avaricious Maura Duran meets the main characters in the guise of Karina Rosemberg, a rich heiress whose land Eliseo covets. Manipulated by Maura, Eliseo detests Aymar and her relationship with his son and Maura falls in love with Eliseo's oldest son David.

The real Karina Rosemberg was crazy because she saw her parents burned alive. She was in the care of an old man who found her wandering. Unfortunately he died and afterwards Aymar took care of her.. Karina had met David and fallen in love with him, despite his drunkenness at the time, but he does not reciprocate her feelings because he is infatuated with Maura. Maura's attempts to separate Aymar and Nicolás include a fake pregnancy (with Nicolás, the alleged father), an attempted murder and the killing of Nicolás' youngest brother, Leonardo.

Sirenita who is the real Karina Rosemberg decides to run away from home because David confesses his love to someone else. She meets a kind women who helps her get over her feelings for David by giving her a makeover and teaching her manners.

At the end of the series, Maura is stung by a swarm of bees and dies of anaphylactic shock. David and Karina and Aymar and Nicolás marry, and both couples are happy – Nicolás and Aymar with their son Hernán Nicolás Jr. and their nephew Leonardo; and Karina and David with their son Elisèo David.

== Cast ==
=== Main ===
- Sara Maldonado as Aymar Lazcano Mayu
- Erick Elías as Nicolás Bravo Andrade
- Mariana Seoane as Maura Durán Linares / Karina Rossemberg
- Alejandro Tommasi as Eliseo Bravo

=== Secondary ===
- Ernesto D'Alessio as Leonardo Bravo Andrade
- Manuel Ojeda as Capitán Pablo Solís
- Íngrid Martz as Karina Rossemberg "Sirenita" / Valeria Ross
- Aarón Hernán as Padre Augusto
- Frances Ondiviela as María Teresa Andrade de Bravo
- Úrsula Prats as Luisa Linares vda. de Durán
- Macaria as Paloma Martínez
- Delia Casanova as Micaela Trinidad
- Adalberto Parra as Nakuk Kum
- Oscar Traven as Mario Abascal
- Evelio Arias Ramos as Tacho
- Ivonne Ley as Celina Trinidad
- Ferdinando Valencia as Lisandro Bravo Martínez
- Arturo Posada as Rigo
- Federico Pizarro as Raúl Abascal
- Salvador Ibarra as Cirilo
- Ricardo Guerra as Cuco
- Juan Carlos Serrán as Lucio Trinidad
- Maribel Fernández as Carmelita de Trinidad
- Pietro Vannucci as Botel
- Vicente Herrera as Aquilino Sánchez
- Patricia Martínez as Donata
- Dobrina Cristeva as Cleotilde
- Marco Uriel as Dr. Andrés Gutiérrez
- José Luis Reséndez as David Bravo
- Julio Camejo as José Miguel Díaz Luna
- Alejandra Procuna as Martha Valdivia
- Flor Procuna as Rosalinda Díaz Luna
- Humberto Elizondo as Lic. Alberti
- Anastasia Acosta as Leonor
- Vielka Valenzuela as Lic. Méndez
- Magda Guzmán as Yolanda
- Xavier Ortiz as Emilio
- Erika Buenfil as Patsy Sandoval Portillo
- Carlos Cámara Jr. as Isaac Rossemberg
- Kelchie Arizmendi as Brisa
- Mar Contreras as Penélope Montalbán
- Lis Vega as Lizesca
- Arturo García Tenorio as Gastón

=== Special participation ===
- René Strickler as Hernán Lazcano
- Eugenia Cauduro as Analy Mayu Vda. de Lazcano
- Israel Jaitovich as Roque Durán
- Alejandro Ávila as Víctor
- Archie Lafranco as Manuel de Molina "Hombre Blanco"
- Patricio Cabezut as Barraza
- José Carlos Ruiz as Ahzac
- Lupita Jones as Herself
