= Violeta Isfel =

Mexican actress and singer

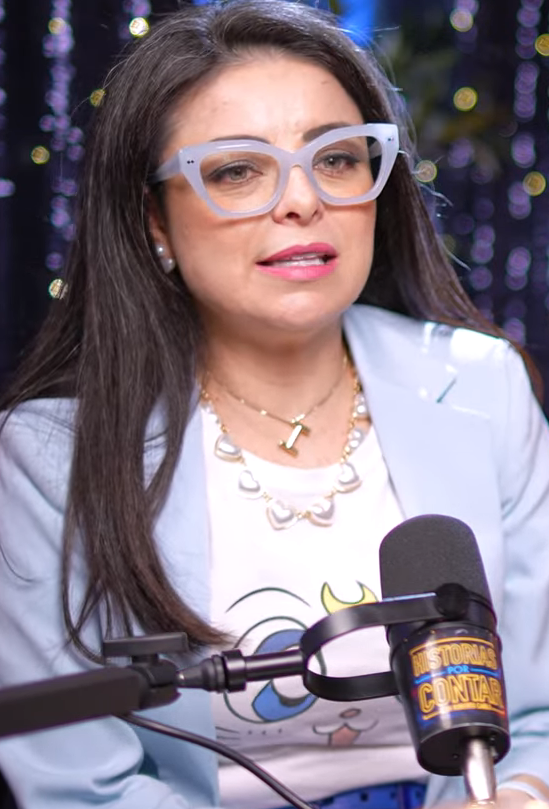
- Isfel in 2025
- Born: Violeta Isfel Garma García; June 11, 1985 (age 40); Mexico City, D.F., Mexico
- Occupations: Actress; singer; model
- Children: 1

Violeta Isfel (born Violeta Isfel Garma García on June 11, 1985 in Mexico City, D.F., Mexico), is a Mexican actress, singer and model. She played Antonella in the telenovela Atrévete a soñar, and has performed in further telenovelas such as Lola, érase una vez, Peregrina, Las tontas no van al cielo, and Una familia con suerte.

== Filmography ==
=== Television ===
Year	Title	Role	Notes
1993	La última esperanza		Television debut
1994–2006	Mujer, casos de la vida real	Various role	9 episodes
1997	María Isabel	Child Gloria Mendiola	Guest star
2002	Entre el amor y el odio	Paz	
2002–2003	¡Vivan los niños!	Florencia	
2004	Rubí	Rubí's enemy	
2005–2006	Peregrina	Rosario	
2007–2008	Lola, érase una vez	Gaby	Series regular
2008	La rosa de Guadalupe	Polla	Episode: "Flor de metal"
2008	Las tontas no van al cielo	Lucía López Fernández	Series regular
2009–2010	Atrévete a soñar	Antonella	Series regular
2011–2012	Una familia con suerte	Mónica Rinaldi	Series regular
2012–2013	Porque el amor manda	Marisela Pérez	Series regular
2012–2014	Como dice el dicho	Regina / Cecilia / Úrsula	"Quien no oye consejo" (Season 2, Episode 39) "El amor no termina" (Season 4, Episode 3)
2014–2015	Yo no creo en los hombres	Nayeli	20 episodes
2015–2016	La vecina	Titina	Recurring role
2017	Relatos de Mujeres	Consuelo Velázquez	Season 1, Episode 10
2017–2019	Mi marido tiene familia	Clarissa	Recurring role
2019–2020	Lorenza	La Cuquis	Series regular
2023	Bola de locos	Xiomara Feng shui	Series regular
2023	El príncipe del barrio	Polly	Series regular

=== Film ===
Year	Title	Role	Notes
2012	Hotel Transylvania	Mavis	Spanish dub voice
2015	Hotel Transylvania 2	Mavis	Spanish dub voice
2018	Hotel Transylvania 3: Summer Vacation	Mavis	Spanish dub voice
2022	Hotel Transylvania: Transformania	Mavis	Spanish dub voice

== Awards and nominations ==
=== Premios TVyNovelas ===
Year	Category	Telenovela	Result
2009	Best Female Revelation	Las tontas no van al cielo	Nominated
2010	Best Co-star Actress	Atrévete a Soñar	Won

=== Kids Choice Awards México ===
Year	Category	Telenovela	Result
2010	Favorite Female Character in a Series	Atrévete a soñar	Nominated
2010	Favorite Villain	Atrévete a soñar	Won
2010	Favorite Look	Atrévete a soñar	Nominated
2012	Favorite Supporting Actress	Una familia con suerte	Nominated
2013	Favorite Actress Dubbing	Hotel Transylvania	Nominated
