= Evelio Arias Ramos =

Mexican actor and comedian (1966–2008)

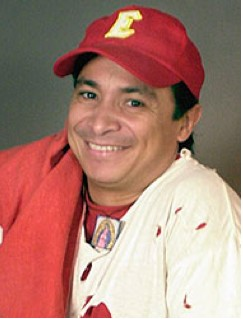
- Born: Evelio Arias Ramos; 10 September 1966; Ciudad Pemex, Tabasco Mexico
- Died: 5 November 2008 (aged 42); Mexico City, Mexico
- Other names: Evelio Con V Evelio con V Chica; Gio
- Occupations: Actor, comedian
- Years active: 1997–2008

Evelio Arias Ramos (10 September 1966 – 5 November 2008) was a Mexican actor and comedian.

== Death ==
In October 2008, he was admitted to a hospital in Mexico City. After two weeks of internment, on 5 November, Evelio passed away at the age of 42, having suffered from bilateral pneumonia caused by acquired immunodeficiency syndrome (AIDS).

== Filmography ==
Telenovelas, Films, presenter
Year	Title	Role	Notes
1999	El cometa	Policeman 2	Film
2000	Humor es... los comediantes	Himself/Presenter	TV show
2000	Siempre te amaré	Evelio	Supporting role
2001–05	Vida TV	Himself/Presenter	TV show
2002–03	Clase 406	Paco	Supporting role
2007–08	Tormenta en el paraíso	Tacho	Supporting role
2009	María de todos los Ángeles	Delfino	Posthumous- TV Series
