= María de todos los Ángeles =

- Genre: Sitcom
- Created by: Mara Escalante
- Starring: Mara Escalante; Ariel Miramontes; Carlos Cobos; Alma Cero; Montserrat Marañón; Evelio con V Chica; Beng Zeng; Pedro Romo; José Luis Guarneros
- Theme music composer: Israel Jurado Godinez
- Country of origin: Mexico
- Original language: Spanish
- No. of seasons: 2
- No. of episodes: 33

Production
- Executive producers: André Barren; Pedro Ortiz de Pinedo
- Producers: Luis Eduardo Reyes; Manuel Ajenjo; Mara Escalante
- Production company: TelevisaUnivision

Original release
- Network: Las Estrellas
- Release: 2 August 2009 – 2 February 2014

María de todos los Ángeles is a Mexican sitcom television series created by and starring Mara Escalante for TelevisaUnivision. The cast includes Ariel Miramontes, Carlos Cobos, Alma Cero, Montserrat Marañón, Evelio con V Chica, Beng Zeng, Pedro Romo, and José Luis Guarneros. It aired on Las Estrellas from 2 August 2009 to 2 February 2014.

== Cast ==
- Mara Escalante as María de Todos los Ángeles and María de la Luz Martínez "Doña Lucha"
- Ariel Miramontes as Albertano Santacruz Martínez
- Carlos Cobos (season 1) and Pedro Romo (season 2) as Don Carmelo
- Alma Cero as Rosa Aurora Santacruz Martínez
- Montserrat Marañón as Ariadne Betzabé Domínguez "Betza"
- Evelio con V Chica as Delfino (season 1)
- Beng Zeng as Jesús Antonio Santacruz Martínez "Chino"
- José Luis Guarneros as Macaco (season 2)

== Production ==
The first season was filmed in 2007, with the series premiering two years later on 2 August 2009. In September 2009, the series was renewed for a second season. After years of postponement, the second season began filming on 15 July 2013.

== Episodes ==
Series	Episodes	Originally released	
Series	Episodes	First released	Last released
1	13	2 August 2009	27 September 2009
2	20	24 November 2013	2 February 2014

=== Season 1 (2009) ===
No. overall	No. in season	Title	Original release date
1	1	"El sueño Angélico"	2 August 2009
2	2	"El perro de los focos"	9 August 2009
3	3	"Los chiles de la discordia"	16 August 2009
4	4	"San Chambelán"	23 August 2009
5	5	"Sostengo el pi"	23 August 2009
6	6	"Ofertín y los vinagres balsámicos"	30 August 2009
7	7	"Los juniors de Satélite"	6 September 2009
8	8	"Carnes frías"	6 September 2009
9	9	"Placentex antiesponge"	13 September 2009
10	10	"Domingo en Chapultepec"	13 September 2009
11	11	"La noche de la langosta"	20 September 2009
12	12	"El rap de Doña Juana"	27 September 2009
13	13	"Una luz al fondo del tinaco"	27 September 2009

=== Season 2 (2013–14) ===
No. overall	No. in season	Title	Original release date
14	1	"San Hipoclorito Arcángel"	24 November 2013
15	2	"Hazlo con ella"	24 November 2013
16	3	"Coma pozole"	1 December 2013
17	4	"Tiempo de amigos"	1 December 2013
18	5	"Casino en la azotea"	8 December 2013
19	6	"El extraño mundo de los comerciantes"	8 December 2013
20	7	"La casa de los sustos"	22 December 2013
21	8	"La fonda"	22 December 2013
22	9	"El lingo li lingo"	29 December 2013
23	10	"Esto es ta-mal"	29 December 2013
24	11	"Lucha interna parte 1"	5 January 2014
25	12	"Lucha interna parte 2"	5 January 2014
26	13	"Una patita de conejo fresca"	12 January 2014
27	14	"Sed de triunfo"	12 January 2014
28	15	"Patadas de ahogada"	19 January 2014
29	16	"Angeloterapeuta"	19 January 2014
30	17	"Sexy calendario"	26 January 2014
31	18	"Se busca"	26 January 2014
32	19	"Celos por catálogo"	2 February 2014
33	20	"La boda imposible"	2 February 2014

== Accolades ==
Award	Year	Category	Nominee(s)	Result	Ref.
Premios TVyNovelas	2010	Best Series	Mara Escalante & André Barren	Won	
Premios TVyNovelas	2014	Best Series	Mara Escalante & Pedro Ortiz de Pinedo	Won	
