= Alma Cero =

Mexican television actor and stage actor

- Born: Alma Cero Delgado Quintero; August 8, 1975 (age 50); Mexico City, Mexico
- Other name: Rosa Aurora
- Occupations: Actress, singer, tv hostess, comedian, ballerina
- Years active: 1993–present
- Partner: Enrique Orozco
- Children: Bruno Vega

Alma Cero (born Alma Cero Delgado Quintero) is a Mexican actress, singer, television hostess and ballerina. She is better known from series María de todos los Ángeles.

== Biography ==
Cero was born on August 8, 1975, in Mexico City, Mexico. Studied music, dance and stage workshop at the INBA. Later entered to study acting in the CEA of Televisa. She participated in the television series María de todos los Ángeles, playing the character of Rosa Aurora. In 2014, participated in the coverage of the Mundial 2014. Until September 2016, she conducted the television program Sabadazo.

In 2017, she joined TV Azteca for the comedy soap opera 3 familias, where she stars alongside Carlos Espejel.

In 2018, she returned to Televisa after her participation in 3 familias.

== Personal life ==
In 1997 Cero gave birth to her son Bruno. In 2014 she had a relationship with banda music singer Edwin Luna until 2017. She married Dr. Enrique Orozco in February 2024.

== Filmography ==
=== Hostess ===
- Tumba Burros
- Sabadazo
- Estrella2
- Desmadruga2
- Par de Ases
- La jaula
- No manches
- Incognito
- TeleHit
- Cobertura Mundial 2014
- El Naucalpan Son Machín

=== Telenovelas ===
- La tempestad (6 Episodes)

=== Series ===
- María de todos los Ángeles – Rosa Aurora Santa Cruz
- Como dice el dicho – Selene (1 episode)
- Burócratas – Dolores "Lola" Hernández

=== Films ===
- La derrota
