= 37th TVyNovelas Awards =

2019 Mexican TV awards

- Date: March 10, 2019
- Location: Mexico City, Mexico
- Hosted by: Arath de la Torre & Montserrat Oliver

Highlights
- Most awards: Amar a muerte (14)
- Most nominations: Mi marido tiene familia (21)

Television/radio coverage
- Network: Las Estrellas
- Viewership: 2.80 million

The 37th TVyNovelas Awards for the best of telenovelas and TV series took place on March 10, 2019, and was televised in Mexico on Las Estrellas. Arath de la Torre and Montserrat Oliver hosted the ceremony. The first round of nominees were revealed on January 31, 2019, and the finalists were announced on February 18, 2019.

Amar a muerte won 14 awards, the most for the evening including Best Telenovela of the Year. Among other winners are Mi marido tiene familia and Like, who each won an award.

== Summary of awards and nominations ==
Telenovela	Nominations	Awards
Mi marido tiene familia	21	1
Amar a muerte	15	14
Like	14	1
Hijas de la luna	12	0
Por amar sin ley	9	0
La Piloto	6	0
La jefa del campeón	2	0
Tenías que ser tú	1	0

== Winners and nominees ==
=== Telenovelas ===
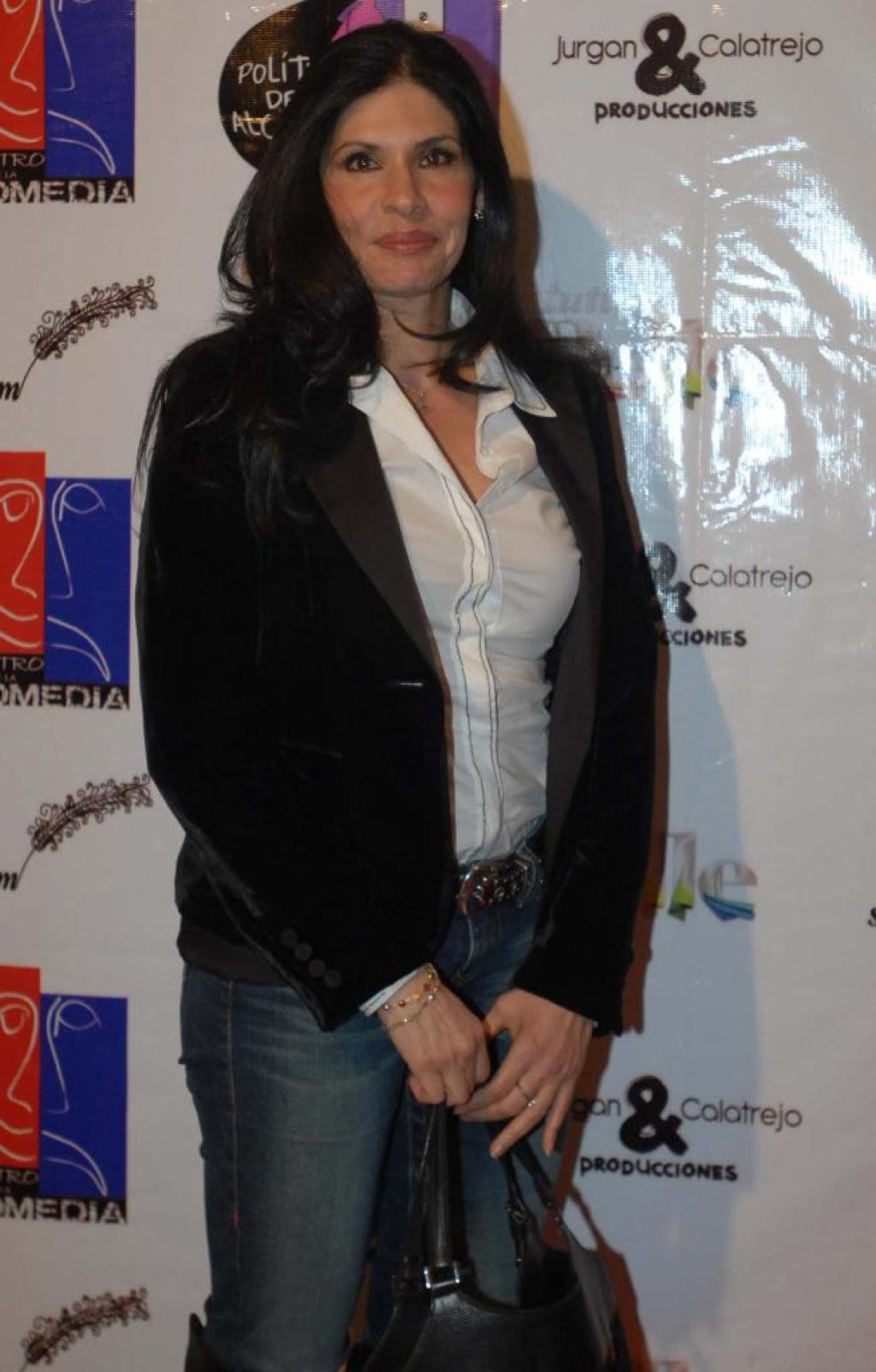
Raquel Garza, winner for Best Leading Actress.

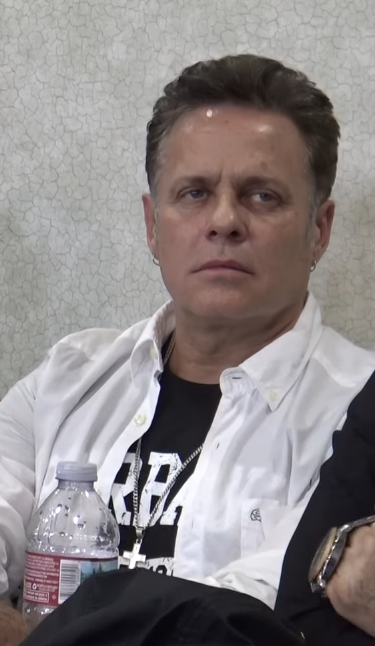
Alexis Ayala, winner for Best Leading Actor.

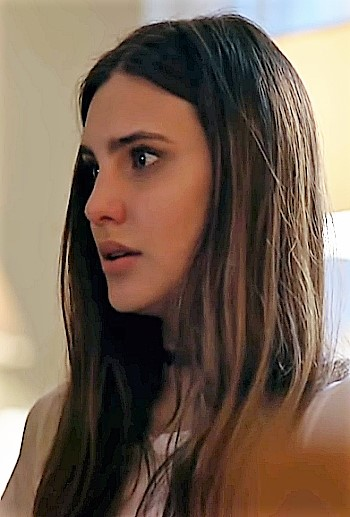
Macarena Achaga, winner for Best Co-lead Actress.

Best Telenovela of the Year	Best Original Story or Adaptation
Amar a muerte - Carlos Bardasano; La Piloto - Carlos Bardasano; Like - Pedro Damián; Mi marido tiene familia - Juan Osorio; Por amar sin ley - José Alberto Castro	Leonardo Padrón - Amar a muerte; Alejandro Pohlenz and Palmira Olguín - Hijas de la luna; María Balmori - Like; Pablo Ferrer, Santiago Pineda, and Martha Jurado - Mi marido tiene familia; Mónica Agudelo, José Alberto Castro, Vanesa Varela, and Fernando Garcilita - Por amar sin ley
Best Actress	Best Actor
Angelique Boyer - Amar a muerte; Michelle Renaud - Hijas de la luna; Livia Brito - La Piloto; Susana González - Mi marido tiene familia; Zuria Vega - Mi marido tiene familia	Michel Brown - Amar a muerte; Carlos Ferro - La jefa del campeón; Arath de la Torre - Mi marido tiene familia; Daniel Arenas - Mi marido tiene familia; David Zepeda - Por amar sin ley
Best Antagonist Actress	Best Antagonist Actor
Claudia Martín - Amar a muerte; Mariluz Bermúdez - Hijas de la luna; Ilza Ponko - La Piloto; Bárbara Islas - Mi marido tiene familia; Grettell Valdez - Tenías que ser tú	Alejandro Nones - Amar a muerte; Alexis Ayala - Hijas de la luna; Óscar Schwebel - Like; Germán Bracco - Mi marido tiene familia; Julián Gil - Por amar sin ley
Best Leading Actress	Best Leading Actor
Raquel Garza - Amar a muerte; Cynthia Klitbo - Hijas de la luna; Isela Vega - Like; Diana Bracho - Mi marido tiene familia; Carmen Salinas - Mi marido tiene familia	Alexis Ayala - Amar a muerte; Omar Fierro - Hijas de la luna; Patricio Castillo - Mi marido tiene familia; Rafael Inclán - Mi marido tiene familia; Guillermo García Cantú - Por amar sin ley
Best Co-lead Actress	Best Co-lead Actor
Macarena Achaga - Amar a muerte; Geraldine Galván - Hijas de la luna; Gabriela Platas - Mi marido tiene familia; Laura Vignatti - Mi marido tiene familia; Altair Jarabo - Por amar sin ley	Arturo Barba - Amar a muerte; Mario Morán - Hijas de la luna; Rodrigo Murray - Like; José Pablo Minor - Mi marido tiene familia; José María Torre - Por amar sin ley
Best Young Lead Actress	Best Young Lead Actor
Bárbara López - Amar a muerte; Ale Müller - Like; Macarena García - Like; Roberta Damián - Like; Jade Fraser - Mi marido tiene familia	Santiago Achaga - Like; Gonzalo Peña - Amar a muerte; Carlos Said - Like; Mauricio Abad - Like; Emilio Osorio - Mi marido tiene familia
Best Direction	Best Direction of the Cameras
Alejandro Lozano, Carlos Cock, and Rolando Ocampo - Amar a muerte; Salvador Sánchez and Alejandro Gamboa - Hijas de la luna; Rolando Ocampo - La Piloto; Luis Pardo and Eloy Ganuza - Like; Aurelio Ávila, Francisco Franco, and Juan Pablo Blanco - Mi marido tiene familia	Mauricio Manzano and Martha Montufar - Mi marido tiene familia; Gabriel Vazquez Bulman and Jesús Najera - Hijas de la luna; Walter Dohener, Victor Herrera, Luis Rodriguez - La jefa del campeón; Vivian Sánchez Ross and Daniel Ferrer - Like; Bernardo Najera and Mauricio Manzano - Por amar sin ley
Best Musical Theme	Best Cast
"Me muero" - Carlos Rivera - Amar a muerte; "Tengo" - Timbiriche - Hijas de la luna; "Buena vida" - Daddy Yankee and Natti Natasha - La Piloto; "Este movimiento" - Like - Like; "Tú eres la razón" - Margarita La Diosa de la Cumbia and Los Fontana - Mi marido tiene familia	Amar a muerte; Hijas de la luna; La Piloto; Mi marido tiene familia; Por amar sin ley

=== Others ===
Best Unit Program	Best Comedy Program
La rosa de Guadalupe; Como dice el dicho; Sin miedo a la verdad	Nosotros los guapos; 40 y 20; La parodia; Simón dice; Vecinos
Best Entertainment Program	Best Reality
Hoy; Cuéntamelo ya; Intrusos; Más noche	Me caigo de risa; La Voz México; Mira quién baila; Reto 4 elementos; Al final todo queda en familia
Best Program of Pay Television
Montse y Joe; Con permiso; Game time; Miembros al aire; Netas divinas

=== Special recognitions ===
- Verónica Castro - Recognition for her career

== Performers ==
The following individuals, listed in order of appearance, presented awards or performed musical numbers.

=== Presenters ===
Name(s)	Role
Ariel Miramontes; Mara Escalante	Comedy sketches
Altair Jarabo; David Zepeda	Presenters: Best Co-lead Actor
Mariluz Bermúdez; Alejandro Calva	Presenters: Best Program of Pay Television
Emilio Osorio; Joaquín Bondoni	Presenters: Best Comedy Program
Renata Notni; José María Torre	Presenters: Best Unit Program
Claudia Martín; Roberto Palazuelos	Presenters: Best Entertainment Program
Irina Baeva; Alexis Ayala	Presenters: Best Reality
Mane de la Parra; Michelle Renaud; Polo Morín	Presenters: Best Musical Theme
Grettell Valdez; Alejandro Nones	Presenters: Best Young Lead Actress
Cynthia Urías; Sofía Escobosa	Presenters: Best Young Lead Actor
Arath de la Torre; Montserrat Oliver	Presenters: Best Direction of the Cameras
Mariana Torres; José Ron	Presenters: Best Cast
Susana González; Raúl Araiza	Presenters: Best Direction
Sara Maldonado; Carlos Ferro	Presenters: Best Leading Actress
Macarena Achaga; Juan Carlos Barreto	Presenters: Best Leading Actor
Andrea Legarreta; Julián Gil	Presenters: Best Co-lead Actress
Arath de la Torre; Montserrat Oliver	Presenters: In Memoriam tribute
Galilea Montijo; Inés Gómez Mont	Presenters: Best Antagonist Actress
Livia Brito; Arap Bethke	Presenters: Best Antagonist Actor
Galilea Montijo	Presenter: Recognition to Verónica Castro for her career
Gabriel Soto	Presenter: Best Actress
Angelique Boyer	Presenter: Best Actor
Maite Perroni; Sebastián Rulli	Presenter: Best Telenovela of the Year

=== Performers ===
Name(s)	Performed
Gloria Trevi	"Vas a recordarme" "Me lloras"
Carlos Rivera	"Sería más fácil" "Me muero"
Maite Perroni	"Brillarás" during the annual In Memoriam tribute
Los Ángeles Azules	"Nunca es suficiente"

== In Memoriam ==
The annual In Memoriam segment was introduced by the hosts Arath de la Torre and Montserrat Oliver with Maite Perroni performing "Brillaras".

The segment paid tribute to the following 20 artists:

- Agustín Bernal
- Graciela Bernardo
- Carmela Rey
- Rogelio Guerra
- Arcelia Larrañaga
- Jaime Puga
- Gregorio Casal
- Fela Fábregas
- Alejandro Aguilera Mendieta
- Esteban Mayo
- Santiago Galindo
- María Rubio
- Melquiades Sánchez Orozco
- Lucho Gatica
- Lourdes Deschamps
- Fernando Luján
- Maty Huitrón
- Thelma Tixou
- Fernando Gaitán
- Christian Bach
