= TVyNovelas Award for Best Unit Program =

Mexican television award

- Awarded for: Best television weekly series
- First award: 2013; La rosa de Guadalupe
- Currently held by: 2020; La rosa de Guadalupe

== Winners and nominees ==
=== 2010s ===
| Winner | Nominated |
31st TVyNovelas Awards
| La rosa de Guadalupe by Miguel Ángel Herros | Como dice el dicho by Genoveva Martínez; La familia P.Luche by Eugenio Derbez |
32nd TVyNovelas Awards
| La rosa de Guadalupe by Miguel Ángel Herros | Como dice el dicho by Genoveva Martínez; La CQ |
33rd TVyNovelas Awards
| Como dice el dicho by Genoveva Martínez | Hermosa esperanza; Laura by María Eugenia Silva Alvarado; La rosa de Guadalupe by Miguel Ángel Herros |
34th TVyNovelas Awards
| Como dice el dicho by Genoveva Martínez | La rosa de Guadalupe by Miguel Ángel Herros; Laura by María Eugenia Silva Alvarado |
35th TVyNovelas Awards
| Como dice el dicho by Genoveva Martínez | La rosa de Guadalupe by Miguel Ángel Herros |
36th TVyNovelas Awards
| La rosa de Guadalupe by Miguel Ángel Herros | Como dice el dicho by Genoveva Martínez |
37th TVyNovelas Awards
| La rosa de Guadalupe by Miguel Ángel Herros | Como dice el dicho by Genoveva Martínez; Sin miedo a la verdad by Rubén Galindo |

=== 2020s ===
| Winner | Nominated |
38th TVyNovelas Awards
| La rosa de Guadalupe by Miguel Ángel Herros | Como dice el dicho by Genoveva Martínez; Esta historia me suena by Genoveva Martínez |

== Records ==
- Most awarded program: La rosa de Guadalupe, 5 times.
- Most nominated program: La rosa de Guadalupe and Como dice el dicho with 7 nominations.
- Most nominated program without a win: Laura with 2 nominations.
- Program winning after short time: Como dice el dicho (2015, 2016 and 2017), 3 consecutive years.
- Program winning after long time: La rosa de Guadalupe (2014 and 2018), 4 years difference.
