= La CQ: nuevo ingreso =

Mexican television series

- Genre: Sitcom
- Created by: Pedro Ortiz de Pinedo
- Directed by: Sergio Adrián Sánchez
- Starring: Tania Nicole; Nicolás Pindas; Mayte Fernández; Nico Villagrana; Sammy Schoulund; Leo Pérez Torreblanca; Abril Tayabas Vela; José María Nieto
- Theme music composer: Giorgio Torelli
- Opening theme: "La CQ es para siempre" by Main cast
- Composer: Raúl Crespín
- Country of origin: Mexico
- Original language: Spanish
- No. of seasons: 4
- No. of episodes: 120

Production
- Executive producer: Pedro Ortiz de Pinedo
- Producers: Zuly González; Ramón Salomón
- Editor: Felipe Ortiz
- Production company: TelevisaUnivision

Original release
- Network: Canal 5
- Release: 9 December 2024 – present

Related
- La CQ

La CQ: nuevo ingreso (English: La CQ: New Entry) is a Mexican sitcom television series created by Pedro Ortiz de Pinedo. It is a sequel to La CQ and follows a new group of students at the middle school Constantino Quijano. The series premiered on Canal 5 on 9 December 2024. The second season premiered on 7 April 2025. The third season premiered on 1 September 2025. The fourth season premiered on 1 December 2025.

== Cast ==
=== Main ===
- Tania Nicole Chávez as Sofi, the school's cheerleading captain who has insecurity problems. She used to go out with Alan, but with the arrival of Quique, her feelings change.
- Nicolás Pindas as Quique, a new student at Constantino Quijano. His dream is to be an actor and singer but he has stage fright.
- Mayte Fernández as Jackie, Sofi's best friend and Alan's twin sister who loves the 1980s to the point of dressing and speaking slang from that decade.
- Nico Villagrana as Choche, a mythomaniac who claims to be a millionaire, when in fact he is the opposite.
- Sammy Schoulund as Frida, a smart and snarky student with an interest in fashion design. She is the sister of Monche from the original series.
- Leo Pérez Torreblanca as Alan, the school's bully and captain of the soccer team, Jackie's twin brother and Sofi's ex-boyfriend.
- Abril Tayabas Vela as Nancy, a cheerleader with a one-sided crush on Alan and becomes his partner in crime to be close to him.
- José María Nieto as Mini, Choche and Frida's best friend, he considers himself to be a heartthrob, even though no girl pays attention to him.

=== Recurring and guest stars ===
- Luis Fernando Ceballos as Roque, a former student from the original series who works as a janitor. He seeks to redeem himself for all the misdeeds he committed during his youth, so he helps the students get out of trouble.
- Juan Frese as Principal Osvaldo Baldomero Pinto
- Mercedes Vaughan as Professor Clodomira, a gym teacher who is in charge of the cheerleaders.
- Lorena Bargalló as Karla, Quique's mother and owner of the pizzeria La Nonna, where the students hangs out.
- Carolina Pérezcano as Brenda, Nancy's friend
- Leticia Amezcua as Professor Bambalina, a theater teacher.
- Gael Pineda as Benito
- Santino Arévalo as Pancho
- Victoria Vázquez as Tere
- Melissa Hallivis as Rupertina, the school's lunch lady.
- Claudio Herrera as Professor Godofredo, a math and science teacher.
- Luka Herrera as Frankie
- Cosette Esparza as Gaby, a conceited and intelligent student who often feels superior to her classmates.
- Juan Pablo Estrada as Tato
- Emiliano Santa Cruz as Professor Moroco, a history and geography teacher.
- José Dammert as Professor Humberto, a Spanish teacher who becomes Karla's love interest and eventual boyfriend.
- Lukas Urkijo as Juan Gómez
- Enrique Logan as El Pifas Gómez
- Maximiliano Uribe as Marco
- Jesús Ñuñez as The ghost of locker 13
- Andrea Montalvo as Hipotenusa "Lorenza" Cloroplasto
- Ale Müller as Clara Licona
- Emiliano Flores as Ángel del Río
- Jocelin Zuckerman as Adri del Río
- Ceci Flores as Paty Tanada, a former exchange student who returns as a substitute teacher.
- Chaparrón Chuacheneger as Arturo Loera, Mini's father
- Tadeo Bonavides as Fausto, a 3rd year student who Frida has a crush on.
- Fernanda Urdapilleta as Jenny Pinto del Rostro, a former student now working as Danny's assistant.
- Ferny Graciano as Danny Pinto del Rostro, a former student who is now a singer.
- Celiwaki as Briggite / Rosario Bertha Pérez, a girl Alan hires to be Choche's French girlfriend.
- Erika Buenfil as Maricela Limantour, Jackie and Alan's grandmother.
- Ainhara Figger as Janitzia
- Charlotte Carter as Gina
- Geraldine Galván as Caro, a class of 2008 student. Galván previously portrayed Clara in the unaired pilot of the original series.
- Mariano Romo as Alex, a class of 2008 student. Romo previously portrayed Ángel in the unaired pilot of the original series.
- Natalia Juárez as Jessy, a class of 2008 student. Juárez previously portrayed Jenny in the unaired pilot of the original series.
- Sebastián Peréa as Max, a class of 2008 student. Peréa previously portrayed Monche in the unaired pilot of the original series.
- Sabrina Martínez as Ámbar, a class of 2008 student. Martínez previously portrayed Adri in the unaired pilot of the original series.
- Yair Prado as Benny, a class of 2008 student. Prado previously portrayed Beto in the unaired pilot of the original series.
- Steph Cota as Dafne, a class of 2008 student. Cota previously portrayed Danny in the unaired pilot of the original series.

== Production ==
On 5 June 2024, series creator Pedro Ortiz de Pinedo announced that a sequel to La CQ was in production, with Luis Fernando Ceballos reprising his role as Roque from the original series. Unlike the original series, which was filmed in Venezuela and co-produced with RCTV and Turner International, the sequel is filmed in Mexico and produced solely by TelevisaUnivision. In September 2024, the full cast was announced and a trailer was released. A total of four seasons were ordered to be filmed back-to-back.

== Episodes ==
Season	Episodes	Originally released	
Season	Episodes	First released	Last released
1	20	9 December 2024	23 December 2024
2	40	7 April 2025	9 May 2025
3	36	1 September 2025	26 September 2025
4	24	1 September 2025	18 December 2025

=== Season 1 (2024) ===
No. overall	No. in season	Title	Written by	Original release date
1	1	"La elección de Sofi"	Víctor Acosta	9 December 2024 (Note: This episode was first released on Vix on 2 December 2024, ahead of its premiere on Canal 5.)
When Sofi meets Quique, a new student, she realizes that she has more dreams and aspirations than she thought and decides to sign up for theater class. Meanwhile, Alan, her ex-boyfriend and captain of the soccer team, will try to stop Quique from going far in school.
2	2	"Ser o no ser... O ¿Sí se va a hacer?"	César Ferrón	9 December 2024
Auditions for Romeo and Juliet begin, but Quique is overcome with stage fright, keeping him away from Sofi, who has already won the role of Juliet.
3	3	"Los llevan al baile"	Iñaki Otero	10 December 2024
Sofi and Quique don't know how to ask each other out to the homecoming dance. Alan is also willing to ask her out.
4	4	"Arriba pompones"	Fernando Canek	10 December 2024
Sofi and Nancy compete to be the captain of the cheerleaders and Clodomira lets Sofi know that if she doesn't win, her athletic scholarship could be taken away.
5	5	"El baile de bienvenida"	Carolina Ayala	11 December 2024
Jackie and Mini still don't have a date for homecoming, so they make a bet to bring a date or pay for each other's lunch for a month. Mini has his eye on Brenda, but Jackie does everything to stop him.
6	6	"El gran baile de bienvenida, parte 1"	Pepe Sierra	11 December 2024
The homecoming dance has only brought problems for Quique and Sofi because of someone who wants to sabotage them. Professor Bambalina announces that the best dancers will be the homecoming king and queen.
7	7	"El gran baile de bienvenida, parte 2"	Pepe Sierra	13 December 2024
Alan wants to be homecoming king, just like last year when he was Sofi's boyfriend, but she refuses and would rather dance with Quique to her favorite song. Quique wants to sing a song for Sofi, but everything gets out of control.
8	8	"Bienvenuti, a la nona pizzería"	Rebeca Zuloaga	13 December 2024
Quique distributes flyers around the school to announce the opening of his mother's pizzeria, but Alan takes advantage of this to inform the principal that illegal advertising is being distributed in the school.
9	9	"Quique y Sofi"	Fernando Díaz de León	16 December 2024
Quique wants to ask Sofi to be his girlfriend, but he can't bring himself to do it. Mini gives him advice on how to win her over. Alan tries to sabotage Quique by becoming his best friend and giving him advice on how to win Sofi over.
10	10	"La hija favorita"	Catalina José	16 December 2024
Jackie is determined to win the talent show as she has never been able to win a single contest. Alan wants to stop her, as he can't allow his sister to steal some of the devotion his parents feel for him.
11	11	"El primer beso"	Jorge Karlóz	17 December 2024
Quique is worried because he and Sofi haven't kissed now that they are dating. They each make a plan on their own to have their first kiss, but Alan finds out and tries to prevent it by saying that Quique has a sore in his mouth.
12	12	"CQ Babies"	Maricarmen Morfín	17 December 2024
The students must take care of eggs as if they were their babies for two days and return them to school in good condition, otherwise they will receive a failing grade.
13	13	"Romeo y Julieta vs Las arañas del espacio"	Víctor Acosta	18 December 2024
Quique and Sofi want to go to a movie premiere as their first date, but they have to rehearse for the play. With Roque's help, they plan a fake accident so they can be absent, however Ms. Bambalina decides to replace Sofi.
14	14	"Saliendo de mate-huala para entrar a mate-peor"	César Ferrón	18 December 2024
Choche and Nancy fail their math test and must prepare for the make-up test. Meanwhile, Sofi and Quique accept the conditions of Gaby, the smartest girl in school, to tutor Choche.
15	15	"Mini está de pelos"	Iñaki Otero	19 December 2024
Mini has a dream where he wooed girls with his beard, so he creates a formula to grow a mustache and beard, and thus win over Gaby. When Alan learns about it, he wants to steal the formula to win Sofi back.
16	16	"Una guerra de favores"	Fernando Canek	19 December 2024
The principal announces the Olympics of Knowledge. Frida and Gaby have the best grades, but only one will represent Constantino Quijano.
17	17	"La fiesta de las Olimpiadas"	Jorge Karlóz	20 December 2024
On the day of the Olympics of Knowledge, Gaby organizes her birthday party at the pizzeria. Frida feels she will miss an important moment if she doesn't attend and loses focus during the competition.
18	18	"La pizza más dulce"	Maricarmen Morfín	20 December 2024
Quique and his mom's pizzeria is at risk of closing due to low sales. Thanks to Choche's craving, they create a new pizza flavor that becomes a success and improves sales.
19	19	"El alumno de intercambio"	Carolina Ayala	23 December 2024
When an exchange student arrives at CQ, the girls go crazy for him, not knowing that he is the son of Pifas Gomez, who has sent him to take revenge for him.
20	20	"Estrellita ¿dondé estás?"	Pepe Sierra	23 December 2024
It is Christmas time at la CQ. Mini wants to grow and be the tallest. Choche tells him that whoever places the star will receive a special gift. In the end, the one who places the stars is Roque, since he is the most important person in the school.

=== Season 2 (2025) ===
No. overall	No. in season	Title	Written by	Original release date	Mexico viewers (millions)
21	1	"Feliz cumple-truene"	Rebeca Zuloaga	7 April 2025 (Note: This episode was first released on Vix on 7 March 2025, ahead of its premiere on Canal 5.)	0.77
Sofi forgets her one month anniversary with Quique and he gets upset. Alan sees this as an opportunity to stir up trouble.
22	2	"Sofi vuelve con su ex"	Fernando Díaz de León	7 April 2025	0.77
Quique arrives afraid to see Sofi because of the misunderstanding between them, but Sofi makes sure everything is cleared up.
23	3	"Un mini amor"	Catalina José	8 April 2025	0.76
A popular cheerleader from the opposing team falls in love with Mini and kisses him, but Mini seems unprepared for such emotion.
24	4	"Las nuevas cerdolimpiadas"	Víctor Acosta	8 April 2025	0.76
The Cerdolimpiadas (Pigolympics) are back at La CQ and the team that does the most disgusting things wins. Roque takes control of the competition but the students will try to stop Clodomira from banning them.
25	5	"El primo incómodo"	César Ferrón	9 April 2025	0.61
Marco, Quique's cousin, arrives by surprise at La CQ, which he and his friends are not happy about.
26	6	"El minipresidente"	Pepe Sierra	9 April 2025	0.61
Mini, Alan and Gaby run for student president and each has their own strategy and group of supporters.
27	7	"No está padre"	Fernando Canek	10 April 2025	1.08
Quique misses his father, so Sofi takes advantage of a TV interview to promote the school play to help him find him.
28	8	"Donde manda capitana, no gobierna la porrista"	Jorge Karlóz	10 April 2025	1.08
Cheerleading tryouts are held and Sofi discovers that Frida and Jackie are interested in auditioning.
29	9	"La química del amor"	Rebeca Zuloaga	11 April 2025	0.85
Professor Godofredo informs Quique and Alan that they are failing his class, so they must present a project at the science fair if they want a make-up test.
30	10	"La fiesta sorpresa de Sofi"	Carolina Ayala	11 April 2025	0.85
It is Sofi's birthday and the gang organize a surprise party for her at the pizzeria. Alan finds out and also prepares a party for Sofi at school, to beat Quique.
31	11	"La mamitis de Quique"	Pepe Sierra	14 April 2025 (Note: This episode was first released on Vix on 14 March 2025, ahead of its premiere on Canal 5.)	0.84
Quique finds out that the Professor Humberto wants to go out with his mother, which makes him jealous and furious. However, when he sees her sad, he changes his mind.
32	12	"Un día aburrido"	Maricarmen Morfín	14 April 2025	0.84
During a boring day, the kids receive an announcement that in the next few days the big CQ kermesse will be held. Everyone is excited except Sofi and Quique, who end up fighting because of Alan and Nancy.
33	13	"Kermés imposible"	Catalina José	15 April 2025	0.74
The principal gives the students the news that to participate in the kermesse they will have to pay a fee. Sofi and Quique start a band and plan a performance to earn the fee money, but Alan tries to stop them.
34	14	"Qué hermosa kermés"	Fernando Canek	15 April 2025	0.74
It's the day of the kermesse, the students are preparing to individually set up their booths and be the one who sells the most and win the grand prize. Quique and Sofi have a fake wedding at the event, but Choche mixes up the certificates, and Alan's signature appears on Sofi's certificate.
35	15	"El acta de matrimonio"	Víctor Acosta	21 April 2025	1.00
After Choche's mistake at the kermesse, Sofi wants to divorce Alan so she can be with Quique.
36	16	"El Mini contraataca"	César Ferrón	21 April 2025	1.00
A new exchange student arrives at La CQ and dazzles Jackie as they share their love of the 1980's, which makes Mini jealous.
37	17	"El grano, granote de elote"	Pepe Sierra	22 April 2025	0.94
Alan forces Sofi to participate in the singing contest with him, and Frida takes advantage of the situation to participate with Quique.
38	18	"Un atleta de mucha altura"	Fernando Díaz de León	22 April 2025	0.94
Professor Clodomira organizes a competition for a boy to be part of the cheerleading squad, and Quique, Alan and Mini sign up.
39	19	"El regreso del fantasma del casillero 13, parte 1"	Jorge Karlóz	23 April 2025	0.95
After years of being locked up, the ghost of locker 13 decides to return to take revenge on all the students after revealing his secret.
40	20	"El regreso del fantasma del casillero 13, parte 2"	Maricarmen Morfín	23 April 2025	0.95
The gang must figure out a way to return the ghost of locker 13 to its dimension.
41	21	"Teatro, Shakespeare y otros dramas"	Carolina Ayala	24 April 2025	0.88
The students present the play Romeo and Juliet, but they discover that the costumes have been stolen. Determined to pursue her dreams outside of La CQ, Professor Bambalina says goodbye to her students.
42	22	"Donde las arañas tejen su nido"	Pepe Sierra	24 April 2025	0.88
The state tournament has the soccer players feeling nervous, so the students try to encourage them to take the victory. Nancy has her first kiss with Alan.
43	23	"Las libeli-trukis del Monte Verde"	Rebeca Zuloaga	25 April 2025	0.82
The principal announces that the Monte Verde Dragonflies girls' soccer team will be visiting La CQ, ready to destroy the boys team.
44	24	"Contacto cero"	Fernando Díaz de León	25 April 2025	0.82
Alan provokes a chain of misunderstandings to make Sofi believe that Quique is cheating on her with Frida and thus separate them.
45	25	"Conquistando el examen"	Catalina José	28 April 2025	0.85
46	26	"El examen de Historia"	Víctor Acosta	28 April 2025	0.85
47	27	"Yo no sé ¿Por qué me siento hoy tan diferente?"	César Ferrón	29 April 2025	1.03
48	28	"Tenía que ser la CQ del 8"	Iñaki Otero	29 April 2025	1.03
49	29	"Sale Limantour, entra Almeida"	Fernando Canek	30 April 2025	0.91
50	30	"Regresa la artillería pesada"	Jorge Karlóz	30 April 2025	0.91
51	31	"El reencuentro"	Maricarmen Morfín	1 May 2025	0.93
52	32	"Rap de ñoños"	Carolina Ayala	1 May 2025	0.93
53	33	"Tinte o penalti"	Rebeca Zuloaga	2 May 2025	0.95
54	34	"Para nada, Paty Tanada"	Fernando Díaz de León	2 May 2025	0.95
55	35	"Examinus imposibiluki de pasaruki"	Catalina José	5 May 2025	1.09
56	36	"Roque y Adri"	Víctor Acosta	5 May 2025	1.09
57	37	"Fausto se crush-ó entre nosotros"	César Ferrón	6 May 2025	0.81
58	38	"Mi mamá me mima"	Maricarmen Morfín	6 May 2025	0.81
59	39	"No hay porra que no salve"	Fernando Canek	9 May 2025	0.76
60	40	"La CQ eres tú"	Jorge Karlóz	9 May 2025	0.76

=== Season 3 (2025) ===
No. overall	No. in season	Title	Written by	Original release date (Note: The first twenty episodes of the season were first released on Vix on 1 August 2025, ahead of their premieres on Canal 5.)	Mexico viewers (millions)
61	1	"Celos, comida y confusión"	Maricarmen Morfín	1 September 2025	1.28
Nancy wants to make Alan jealous after seeing him with another girl and to achieve this she uses Choche. The plan works and Alan feels defeated when he sees her kissing Choche.
62	2	"Guerra de gemelos"	Carolina Ayala	2 September 2025	0.60
Jackie and Alan start another food fight and Principal Baldo decides that one of them will have to leave the school. Jackie and Alan's grandmother (Erika Buenfil) has a plan to prevent them from being expelled.
63	3	"Chocherié"	Pepe Sierra	2 September 2025	0.60
Alan hires Briggite to pretend to be Choche's French girlfriend so that Nancy will stay away from him.
64	4	"El Fausto y la furious"	Víctor Acosta	3 September 2025	0.81
Frida, determined to find out if she and Fausto are dating, forces him to ask her out. Mini and Choche fear that their group of friends will split up if Frida dates Fausto.
65	5	"Tengo la personalidad, la tengo, la tengo"	César Ferrón	3 September 2025	0.81
Gaby proposes to Sofi that they bet the captaincy of the cheerleading squad if she fails to beat her on the catwalk of the fashion show.
66	6	"Hey Mini cómo estás, cada vez me gustas más"	Iñaki Otero	4 September 2025	0.77
Jackie shakes off her nerves and decides to declare her love to Mini, but Gina's appearance threatens her plans.
67	7	"Haces el oso, celoso"	Fernando Canek	4 September 2025	0.77
Gaby is jealous when she learns that Alan is still interested in Nancy, so she decides to challenge her to a cheer battle.
68	8	"La pedida de mano"	Jorge Karlóz	5 September 2025	0.73
A mix-up is created when Sofi thinks that Ángel intends to propose to Clara. The students encourage Ángel to propose at the school and lend a hand with the planning. Clara happily says yes to marrying Ángel.
69	9	"Nancy de Bergerac o el teléfono descompuesto"	Maricarmen Morfín	5 September 2025	0.73
The girls come up with a plan to help Nancy get back together with Alan.
70	10	"Los cincuenta años de la CQ"	Carolina Ayala	8 September 2025	0.84
To celebrate the 50th anniversary of La CQ, the principal organizes a party to honor the class of 2008, the class that saved the school.
71	11	"Quique el matadito"	César Ferrón	8 September 2025	0.84
Quique gets outstanding grades, but everyone at school suspects that Professor Humberto is helping him, so the principal fires him. Roque confesses that Quique's grades are his fault, since he has helped him study.
72	12	"SOS un sustituto para el amor"	Rebeca Zuloaga	10 September 2025	0.72
Fausto tells Frida that he is leaving for Canada in three days, so their relationship cannot continue.
73	13	"La carga de ser un hombre hermoso"	Fernando Díaz de León	10 September 2025	0.72
Jackie believes that a man who loves his girlfriend should be able to carry her, so he surprises Mini with this idea, but in doing so, Mini knocks over the statue of Constantino Quijano and is suspended for a week. This puts him at risk of failing because he will miss his exams.
74	14	"Casi famoso"	Catalina José	11 September 2025	0.70
After being teased by some of his classmates, Quique decides to audition for a commercial to become famous and make his father want to meet him.
75	15	"Roque Bachiller, Roque va a chillar"	Víctor Acosta	11 September 2025	0.70
Roque wants to continue his education to become more than a janitor, so the students take care of cleaning the school so that he can study for his exam.
76	16	"La tetología sí existe"	César Ferrón	12 September 2025	0.74
Professor Godofredo asks the students to test an existing scientific theory.
77	17	"Este cuerpo no es mío"	Iñaki Otero	12 September 2025	0.74
An amulet found by Mini and Choche in the lost and found causes everyone to swap bodies.
78	18	"Requiere copia, de la copia, de la copia"	Fernando Canek	1 September 2025	1.28
The students are at risk of failing if they don't turn in their models on time. Since they have broken the photocopier, Mini and Choche have to work as janitors for two weeks.
79	19	"Quique famoso"	Jorge Karlóz	15 September 2025	N/A
Sofi wants Quique to do more auditions, but then she regrets it because she fears that fame will change him and he will forget about her and his friends.
80	20	"Adiós Frida, hola quién"	Maricarmen Morfín	15 September 2025	N/A
Frida gets an exchange scholarship in Buenos Aires and has to leave La CQ, but her friends are devastated. At the same time, a new student arrives and Choche is fascinated by her.
81	21	"Qué sufrida es la vida sin Frida"	Fernando Díaz de León	16 September 2025 (Note: This episode was first released on Vix on 5 September 2025, ahead of its premiere on Canal 5.)	0.77
In Frida's absence, the students decide to find a way to avoid failing their classes. Frida surprises all her classmates by returning to school, despite already having a scholarship at another school.
82	22	"El misterio del acordeón malvado"	Rebeca Zuloaga	16 September 2025	0.77
Sofi is caught with a cheat sheet she didn't make, but this puts her at risk of losing her scholarship. Choche and Mini's investigations lead to the conclusion that Nancy is the person who got Sofi into trouble.
83	23	"Luces, cámara ¿Papá?"	Catalina José	17 September 2025	0.72
Quique goes to a casting call for a travel commercial, where he aims to become famous not only to find his dad, but also to buy his mom a trip. Meanwhile, Sofi is put to the test more than once, but fails to pass the exam and loses her scholarship.
84	24	"XE-CQ"	Víctor Acosta	17 September 2025	0.72
Sofi loses her scholarship, but she decides to find a way to get it back by trying to become an announcer for the school radio. Despite all the auditions to choose the new voice of La CQ, the director decides to give the job to Brenda because her father donated a new console system.
85	25	"Felicidades por... Lo que quieras"	Mary Carmen Ramírez	18 September 2025	0.55
Quique finds himself in a major conflict when he is chosen to star in a new commercial; his fear of failure causes him to have a crisis.
86	26	"Pizza, fama y celos"	Claudio Herrera	18 September 2025 (Note: This episode was first released on Vix on 12 September 2025, ahead of its premiere on Canal 5.)	0.55
Quique is manipulated by Alan and Nancy into believing that Sofi is in love with a customer from the pizzeria, which sparks jealousy between them. Mini has a fan club created by Janitzia, and she is determined to recruit more girls, but Jackie refuses to let her have her way.
87	27	"¿Estudias o trabajas?"	Pepe Sierra	19 September 2025	0.74
Sofi finds herself in a situation where she has to hand in a science project and work at Nonna's, so she asks her friends for help, but Alan tries to cause trouble to drive Quique and Sofi apart.
88	28	"Matanga dijo la changa"	Fernando Díaz de León	19 September 2025	0.74
Professor Godofredo has invented a pair of glasses that let people see what they most desire. The students look for a way to get the glasses so they can see what they have always wanted.
89	29	"¿Vasir o no vasir? El precio de la fama"	Rebeca Zuloaga	22 September 2025	0.52
Quique is the talk of the school after a famous director seeks him out to offer him an important modeling job.
90	30	"Sofi no está, Sofi se fue"	Catalina José	22 September 2025	0.52
91	31	"Alan y Quique BFF"	Víctor Acosta	23 September 2025 (Note: This episode was first released on Vix on 19 September 2025, ahead of its premiere on Canal 5.)	0.88
92	32	"Adiós amor, sin canción"	Mary Carmen Ramírez	23 September 2025	0.88
93	33	"Frida roquera"	Claudio Herrera	25 September 2025	N/A
94	34	"El crush de Jackie"	Pepe Sierra	25 September 2025	N/A
95	35	"Campamento Campus CQ"	Fernando Díaz de León	26 September 2025	0.92
96	36	"La CQ desaparece"	Rebeca Zuloaga	26 September 2025	0.92

=== Season 4 (2025) ===
No. overall	No. in season	Title	Written by	Original release date (Note: The first ten episodes of the season were first released on Vix on 7 Novembere 2025, ahead of their premieres on Canal 5.)	Mexico viewers (millions)
97	1	"Operación Arturito"	Catalina José	1 December 2025	0.87
98	2	"El Pibe Humberto"	Víctor Acosta	1 December 2025	0.87
99	3	"Se necesita asistonta"	Mary Carmen Ramírez	2 December 2025	0.88
100	4	"Hoy tengo que decirte papá"	Pepe Sierra	2 December 2025	0.88
101	5	"La beca de Sofi"	Jorge Karlóz	4 December 2025	0.90
102	6	"El mapa del tesoro"	Fernando Díaz de León	4 December 2025	0.90
103	7	"El código... el código"	Catalina José	5 December 2025	0.60
104	8	"Ayudemos a Sofi"	Víctor Acosta	5 December 2025	0.60
105	9	"Mi amigo secreto"	Mary Carmen Ramírez	8 December 2025	N/A
106	10	"Girls Just Wanna Have Fun"	Pepe Sierra	8 December 2025	N/A
107	11	"Abuget"	Pepe Sierra	9 December 2025 (Note: This episode was first released on Vix on 21 November 2025, ahead of its premiere on Canal 5.)	0.80
108	12	"Y doña Quique baila... así"	Jorge Karlóz	9 December 2025	0.80
109	13	"El -no muy- feliz cumpleaños de Nancy"	Fernando Díaz de León	10 December 2025	0.94
110	14	"Roque se va a Cannes"	Catalina José	10 December 2025	0.94
111	15	"Las Noviolimpiadas"	Víctor Acosta	12 December 2025	0.53
112	16	"Clase de química emocional"	Mary Carmen Ramírez	12 December 2025 (Note: This episode was first released on Vix on 5 December 2025, ahead of its premiere on Canal 5.)	0.53
113	17	"Muchachitas"	Claudio Herrera	15 December 2025	0.74
114	18	"A güelita soy tu nieta"	Pepe Sierra	15 December 2025	0.74
115	19	"La firma de playeras"	Jorge Karlóz	16 December 2025	0.86
116	20	"Los Bloopers"	Fernando Díaz de León	16 December 2025	0.86
117	21	"El diablo viste de porrista"	Catalina José	17 December 2025	0.61
118	22	"Fantasmas vs Zombies"	Víctor Acosta	17 December 2025	0.61
119	23	"Se vale llorar y reir"	Mary Carmen Ramírez	18 December 2025	N/A
120	24	"Sofi"	Claudio Herrera	18 December 2025	N/A

== Release ==
The series premiered on 9 December 2024, on Canal 5. The first ten episodes became available to stream on Vix prior to their televised premieres. The second season premiered on 7 April 2025. The third season premiered on 1 September 2025. The fourth season premiered on 1 December 2025.

== Reception ==
=== Ratings ===
Viewership and ratings per season of La CQ: nuevo ingreso
Season	Timeslot (CT)	Episodes	First aired		Last aired		Avg. viewers (millions)
Season	Timeslot (CT)	Episodes	Date	Viewers (millions)	Date	Viewers (millions)	Avg. viewers (millions)
2	Mon–Fri 7:00 p.m.	40	7 April 2025	0.77	9 May 2025	0.76	0.88
3	Mon–Fri 7:00 p.m.	36	1 September 2025	1.28	26 September 2025	0.92	0.77
4	Mon–Fri 6:30 p.m.	24	1 December 2025	0.87	18 December 2025	N/A	0.77

=== Awards and nominations ===
Year	Award	Category	Nominated	Result	Ref
2025	Produ Awards	Best Lead Actor – Children's / Teen Series	Nicolás Pindas	Nominated	
