= List of La CQ episodes =

This is the list of episodes for La CQ, the first Cartoon Network Latin American original live-action series. It is created by Pedro Ortíz de Pinedo. All the episodes are directed by Sergio Adrián Sánchez "El Venado" and co-authored by Luis Bautista "Jurgan".

== Series overview ==
Season	Episodes	Originally released	
Season	Episodes	First released	Last released
1	25	August 6, 2012	September 17, 2012
2	24	December 6, 2012	April 7, 2013
3	25	May 6, 2013	October 31, 2013
4	26	December 6, 2013	March 1, 2014

== Episodes ==
=== Pilot (2008) ===
Title	Directed by	Written by	Original release date
"La apuesta"	Sergio Adrián Sánchez "El Venado"	Luis Bautista "Jurgan"	Unaired
The pilot was filmed in 2008 and stars an entirely different cast than the later series. The synopsis of this pilot parallels the episode "Bienvenida a la CQ". It was posted online on September 6, 2025 by Canal 5's YouTube channel. Cast : Mariano Romo as Ángel, Geraldine Galván as Clara, Sebastián Peréa as Monche, Sabrina Martínez as Adri, Yair Prado as Beto, Natalia Juárez as Jenny, Stephanye Damián as Danny, Luigi Ayelo as Roque, Miguel Vallejo as Eleuterio

=== Season 1 (2012) ===
No. overall	No. in season	Title	Written by	Original release date
1	1	"Bienvenida a la CQ"	Luis Bautista "Jurgan"	August 6, 2012
2	2	"Monche Reprobado"	Luis Bautista "Jurgan"	August 6, 2012
3	3	"El Barro de Clara"	Iñaki Otero	August 6, 2012
4	4	"Cartas de Amor"	Luis Bautista "Jurgan" & Rocío Lara	August 8, 2012
5–6	5–6	"Baile de Bienvenida (Part I & II)"	Luis Bautista "Jurgan"	August 14, 2012 (Part I); August 15, 2012 (Part II)
7	7	"El Proyecto de Ciencias"	Luis Bautista "Jurgan"	August 16, 2012
8	8	"Nos Vemos a la Salida"	Claudio Herrera Bracho & Luis Bautista "Jurgan"	August 20, 2012
9	9	"Adri Adicta a los Videojuegos"	Rocío Lara & Luis Bautista "Jurgan"	August 20, 2012
10	10	"El Cumpleaños de Monche"	Luis Bautista "Jurgan" & Óscar Ortiz de Pinedo	August 21, 2012
11	11	"Adri Porrista"	Luis Bautista "Jurgan" & Víctor Acosta	August 22, 2012
12	12	"La Kermés del Mes"	Luis Bautista "Jurgan" & Víctor Acosta	August 23, 2012
13	13	"Arturo Perfecto"	Luis Bautista "Jurgan"	August 24, 2012
14	14	"Las Olimpíadas del Conocimiento"	Luis Bautista "Jurgan" & Sergio Adrián Sánchez "El Venado"	August 27, 2012
15	15	"Clases para Conquistar"	Luis Bautista "Jurgan" & Mauricio Jalife	August 28, 2012
16	16	"Adri Soplona"	Luis Bautista "Jurgan" & Rocío Lara	August 29, 2012
17	17	"El Fisgón del Retrete"	Luis Bautista "Jurgan" & Iñaki Otero	August 30, 2012
18	18	"El Chismógrafo"	Luis Bautista "Jurgan" & Víctor Acosta	August 31, 2012
19	19	"Ángel Apestoso"	Luis Bautista "Jurgan"	September 3, 2012
20	20	"Bromas Pesadras"	Luis Bautista "Jurgan" & Iñaki Otero	September 4, 2012
21	21	"Los Vengadores"	Luis Bautista "Jurgan" & Mauricio Jalife	September 5, 2012
22	22	"Cambio de Personalidades"	Luis Bautista "Jurgan" & Rocío Lara	September 6, 2012
23	23	"Alumnos de Intercambio"	Luis Bautista "Jurgan" & Sergio Adrián Sánchez "El Venado"	September 7, 2012
24	24	"La Novia de Ángel"	Luis Bautista "Jurgan" & Sergio Adrián Sánchez "El Venado"	September 10, 2012
25	25	"El Primer Beso"	Luis Bautista "Jurgan"	September 17, 2012

=== Season 2 (2012–13) ===
No. overall	No. in season	Title	Written by	Original release date
26	1	"Navidad en la CQ"	Magalli Urquieta	December 6, 2012
27	2	"Monche Súper Estrella"	Rocío Lara	March 4, 2013
28	3	"Roque a Segundo"	Alicia Magalli Urquieta Galicia	March 5, 2013
29	4	"Adri Clarividente"	Óscar Ortiz de Pinedo	March 6, 2013
30	5	"Roque Enamorado"	Iñaki Otero	March 7, 2013
31	6	"Pelona de Baldo"	Alicia Magalli Urquieta Galicia	March 8, 2013
32	7	"Tabla Periódica"	Magalli Urquieta	March 11, 2013
33	8	"Cerdolímpiadas"	Óscar Ortiz de Pinedo	March 12, 2013
34	9	"La CQ y Ángel"	Sergio Adrián Sánchez "El Venado"	March 13, 2013
35	10	"Cibernovia"	Claudio Herrera Bracho	March 14, 2013
36	11	"Danny se Revela"	Rocío Lara	March 15, 2013
37	12	"La Elección"	Luis Bautista "Jurgan"	March 18, 2013
38	13	"El Diario de Beto"	Luis Bautista "Jurgan"	March 19, 2013
39	14	"Adri Basquetbolista"	Sergio Adrián Sánchez "El Venado"	March 20, 2013
40	15	"Monche de Bergerac"	Óscar Ortiz de Pinedo	March 21, 2013
41	16	"¿Quién se Equivoca Más?"	Sergio Adrián Sánchez Dorantes	March 22, 2013
42	17	"La Mascota de Monche"	Mauricio Jalife	March 25, 2013
43	18	"Esclava de Jenny"	Magalli Urquieta	March 26, 2013
44	19	"Mundo Paralelo"	Magalli Urquieta	March 27, 2013
45	20	"Beto Profesor de Ciencias"	Rocío Lara	March 28, 2013
46	21	"Lista de Monche"	Óscar Ortiz de Pinedo	March 29, 2013
47	22	"Ángel & Adri"	Rocío Lara	April 2, 2013
48	23	"Salvemos la CQ"	Óscar Ortiz de Pinedo	April 4, 2013
49	24	"Secretos y Humanoides"	Rocío Lara	April 7, 2013

=== Season 3 (2013) ===
No. overall	No. in season	Title	Written by	Original release date
50	1	"Jenny vs Clara"	Mariana Lucía Palos López	May 6, 2013
51	2	"El Karma de Roque"	Sergio Adrián Sánchez "El Venado"	May 7, 2013
52	3	"Sin Celulares"	Víctor Acosta	May 8, 2013
53	4	"Miss Suplente"	Víctor Acosta	May 9, 2013
54	5	"Cuaderno de Tareas"	Ignacio Otero Sosa	May 10, 2013
55	6	"Los Celos de Clara"	Alicia Magalli Urquieta Galicia	May 13, 2013
56	7	"Video Celebridad"	Ignacio Otero Sosa	May 14, 2013
57	8	"Narcolepsia"	Rocío Martínez Lara	May 15, 2013
58	9	"Radio CQ"	Mauricio Antonio Jalife Castañón	May 16, 2013
59	10	"Ángel Chicharito"	Óscar Ortiz de Pinedo	May 17, 2013
60	11	"Jenny Buena Onda"	Alejandra Olvera	May 20, 2013
61	12	"Detrás de las Cámaras"	Sergio Adrián Sánchez Dorantes	May 21, 2013
62	13	"El Cómic de Ángel"	Rocío Martínez Lara	May 22, 2013
63	14	"La Mascota de la CQ"	Alicia Magalli Urquieta Galicia	May 23, 2013
64	15	"Clara Fotógrafa"	Ignacio Otero Sosa	June 3, 2013
65	16	"Lucha CQ Romana"	Óscar Ortíz de Pinedo	June 4, 2013
66	17	"La Muñeca de Danny"	Alicia Magalli Urquieta Galicia	June 5, 2013
67	18	"Pasarela CQ"	Óscar Ortiz de Pinedo	June 6, 2013
68	19	"Autor Farsante"	Alicia Magalli Urquieta Galicia	June 7, 2013
69	20	"Ángel se Va"	Ignacio Otero Sosa	June 10, 2013
70	21	"Danny Pop Star"	Óscar Ortíz de Pinedo	June 11, 2013
71	22	"La Detención"	Mauricio Antonio Jalife Castañón	June 12, 2013
72	23	"Somos Padres"	Ignacio Otero Sosa	June 13, 2013
73–74	24–25	"El Fantasma del Casillero 13 (Part I & II)"	Rocío Martínez Lara	October 31, 2013

=== Season 4 (2013–14) ===
No. overall	No. in season	Title	Written by	Original release date
75	1	"La Visita de Santa en la CQ"	Alejandra Olvera	December 6, 2013
76	2	"Propósitos de Año Nuevo"	Rocío Martínez Lara	January 6, 2014
77	3	"Las Mejores Amigas"	Fernando Javier Muñoz Meza	January 7, 2014
78	4	"La Cuarentena"	Rocío Martínez Lara	January 8, 2014
79	5	"Chavo CQ"	Óscar Ortiz de Pinedo	January 9, 2014
80	6	"El Amor Llega a la CQ"	Rocío Martínez Lara	February 14, 2014
81	7	"La CQ Guarida"	Óscar Ortiz de Pinedo	January 10, 2014
82	8	"Palomitas Sabor a Chicle"	Alicia Magalli Urquieta Galicia	January 13, 2014
83	9	"Prohibido Usar Internet"	Rocío Martínez Lara	January 14, 2014
84	10	"La Venganza de la CQ"	Ignacio Otero Sosa	January 16, 2014
85	11	"El Invento de Beto"	Mauricio Antonio Jalife Castañón	January 17, 2014
86	12	"La Intoxicación"	Sergio Adrián Sánchez Dorantes	January 20, 2014
87	13	"El Mago Usurero"	Óscar Ortíz de Pinedo	January 21, 2014
88	14	"Danny Hipnotista"	Alicia Magalli Urquieta Galicia	January 22, 2014
89	15	"El Hijo del Embajador"	Rocío Martínez Lara	January 23, 2014
90	16	"El Reencuentro"	Óscar Ortíz de Pinedo	January 24, 2014
91	17	"Concurso de Talentos"	Alicia Magalli Urquieta Galicia	January 27, 2014
92	18	"Monche Invisible"	Mauricio Antonio Jalife Castañón	January 28, 2014
93	19	"Recuerdos"	Óscar Ortíz de Pinedo	March 1, 2014
94	20	"El Retiro de Miss Mago"	Ignacio Otero Sosa	January 29, 2014
95	21	"El Vestido de Jenny"	Óscar Ortíz de Pinedo	January 30, 2014
96	22	"La Amnesia de Monche"	Luis Antonio Bautista Jacobo	January 15, 2014
97	23	"Adri y Roque son Novios"	Mauricio Antonio Jalife Castañón	January 31, 2014
98	24	"El Gran Final (Part I): Exámenes Finales"	Alicia Magalli Urquieta Galicia	March 1, 2014
99	25	"El Gran Final (Part II): El Baile de Graduación"	Alicia Magalli Urquieta Galicia	March 1, 2014
100	26	"¡El Fin del Mundo!"	Luis Antonio Bautista Jacobo	March 1, 2014
