= Cuando fui bonita =

- Genre: Romantic comedy
- Based on: She Was Pretty by Jo Sung-hee
- Written by: Pedro Ortiz de Pinedo; Oscar Ortiz de Pinedo; Romy Díaz; Catalina José; Jorge Kárloz
- Directed by: Juan Carlos Muñoz; Ignacio González
- Starring: Geraldine Galván; Daniel Gama; Sergio Madrigal; Daniela Gallardo
- Theme music composer: Jaime Vargas Fabila
- Opening theme: "Contigo es mejor" by José Parra
- Country of origin: Mexico
- Original language: Spanish
- No. of seasons: 1
- No. of episodes: 20

Production
- Executive producer: Pedro Ortiz de Pinedo
- Producers: Zuly González; Manolo Fernández
- Cinematography: Ignacio González
- Production company: TelevisaUnivision

Original release
- Network: Canal 5
- Release: 28 September – 28 October 2026

Cuando fui bonita (English: When I Was Pretty) is a Mexican romantic comedy television series based on the Korean drama She Was Pretty, created by Jo Sung-hee. The series stars Geraldine Galván and Daniel Gama. It aired on Canal 5 from 28 September 2026 to 28 October 2026.

== Plot ==
As a child, Paola was the prettiest and most popular girl in her school. When she meets Juan, an unattractive shy boy rejected by his classmates, she decides to defend him and become his best friend. A unique friendship blossoms between them, which, over time, transforms into her first love. However, they are separated when Juan leaves for Seoul with his father.

Years later, Paola lives a completely different life. Her father's bankruptcy forced her to abandon her dreams of becoming a writer and fight to find a job. Unconcerned with her appearance, Paola survives thanks to the support of Liz, her best friend, a beautiful and fashion-loving young woman who has become like a sister to her. Juan, on the other hand, has undergone a radical transformation. He has become an attractive, brilliant, and successful man. He returns to Mexico to save The Most, a prestigious fashion magazine, but also with a personal mission: to find Paola. When Juan finally manages to locate her, Paola panics.

Afraid of ruining Juan's perception of her, Paola asks Liz to impersonate her. While Liz develops feelings for Juan and her guilt over betraying her best friend grows, Paola gets a job at The Most and discovers that her new boss is Juan. Unable to reveal her identity, Paola will have to endure his criticism and demands. On the other hand, she meets Rodrigo, a funny and charming reporter who falls in love with her just as she is. Little by little, Juan begins to discover small details in Paola that remind him of the girl he loved. Paola's hidden identity, a web of lies, and old childhood promises set the lives of Juan, Paola, Rodrigo and Liz to the test.

== Cast ==
=== Main ===
- Geraldine Galván as Paola Hernández
- Daniel Gama as Juan Ramírez
  - Pablo Briseño as child Juan
- Sergio Madrigal as Rodrigo Vance
- Daniela Gallardo as Liz Lugo
  - María José Parga as child Liz
- Moisés Iván Mora as Pablo Hernández
- Aroa Gimeno as Inés Chávez
- Carmen Becerra as Lulú Cherry
- Alex Figueroa as Héctor Ballesteros
- Cynthia Alesco as Gabriela Montiel
- Renata Bieletto as Nuria Escandón
- Daniel Gochi as Manolo "Manolito" Cuevas
- Angélica Blasini as Ceci Blue
- Gia Franceschi as Brenda Cruz
- Valentina de Abreu as Minnie Luna
- Maria Paula Gay as Karla
- Jean Paul Tardán as Jimeno
- Lalo Zayas as Señor Gutierritos
- Andrea Velázquez as Federica
- Valentina Samzara as Viviana Hernández / child Paola

=== Recurring and guest stars ===
- Alex Fuentes as Tomás
- Juan Antonio Edwards as Humberto Lugo Villagrán
- Carmen Muñoz as Rebeca
- Gina Pedret as Lucía
- María Perroni Garza as Lorena Gaitán Roca

== Production ==
On 5 March 2026, it was announced that Pedro Ortiz de Pinedo would produce a Mexican remake of the Korean drama She Was Pretty for Canal 5. The original series aired on the network in April 2024. On 16 April 2026, Geraldine Galván and Daniel Gama were announced in the lead roles. The following week, Cuando fui bonita was announced as the title of the series. Filming of the series took place from 28 May 2026 to 17 August 2026.

== Ratings ==
Viewership and ratings per season of Cuando fui bonita
Season	Timeslot (CT)	Episodes	First aired		Last aired		Avg. viewers (millions)
Season	Timeslot (CT)	Episodes	Date	Viewers (millions)	Date	Viewers (millions)	Avg. viewers (millions)
1	Mon–Fri 7:00 p.m. (1–19); Wednesday 6:00 p.m. (20)	20	28 September 2026	0.43	28 October 2026	0.44	0.60

== Episodes ==
No.	Title	Original release date	Mexico viewers (millions)
1	"Baile en el campo"	28 September 2026	0.43
2	"He venido por mi paraguas"	30 September 2026	0.43
3	"Trágame tierra"	1 October 2026	0.59
4	"El secreto"	2 October 2026	0.59
5	"La moda me incomoda"	5 October 2026	0.60
6	"Viernes Godín"	7 October 2026	0.39
7	"Mala copa"	8 October 2026	0.73
8	"La última y nos vamos"	9 October 2026	0.53
9	"No tan pronto"	12 October 2026	0.58
10	"Cambio de ruta"	13 October 2026	0.71
11	"Paradas continuas"	14 October 2026	TBD
12	"Recalculando ruta"	15 October 2026	0.57
13	"The Most 30 años"	16 October 2026	0.79
14	"Trauma superado"	19 October 2026	0.80
15	"Entre dos tierras"	20 October 2026	0.61
16	"Encontré mi paraguas"	22 October 2026	0.64
17	"La moneda mágica"	23 October 2026	0.67
18	"Sorpresa"	26 October 2026	0.70
19	"Revelaciones inesperadas"	27 October 2026	0.58
20	"Ten, ten, ten cuidado con los secretos"	28 October 2026	0.44

== Music ==
Cuando fui bonita (Original Soundtrack)

Soundtrack album / EP by Various artists
- Released: 22 September 2026
- Length: 30:48
- Label: Fonarte Latino

Cuando fui bonita (Original Soundtrack) is the soundtrack to the series. It was released by Fonarte Latino on 22 September 2026.

No.	Title	Writer(s)	Performer(s)	Length
1.	"Contigo es mejor"	Jaime Vargas Fabila	José Parra	3:01
2.	"Solo tú y yo"	Vargas Fabila	Daniel Gama; Geraldine Galván	2:55
3.	"Eres solo tú"	Vargas Fabila	Pedro Ortiz de Pinedo	4:25
4.	"Estás aquí"	Eduardo Soto Maya	Emiliano Gatica; Paula Trespalacios	2:15
5.	"Estás en mí"	Vargas Fabila	Miguel Ángel Yael Fernández García	3:29
6.	"Esto es amor"	Soto Maya	Emiliano Gatica	1:27
7.	"Nadie más"	Soto Maya	Daniel Gama	1:45
8.	"No estoy lista"	Vargas Fabila	Reyna Margarita López	3:04
9.	"Soy un corazón"	Álvaro Trespalacios	Andrea Lilián Peña Salazar	3:01
10.	"Una nueva ilusión"	Trespalacios	Steffy Torres	2:23
11.	"Después de todo, todo bien"	Trespalacios	Ivonne Garza González de la Vega	3:03
Total length:				30:48
