= TVyNovelas Award for Best Program of Pay Television =

Mexican television award

- Awarded for: Best pay television weekly program
- First award: 2007; Derecho de admisión
- Currently held by: 2020; Netas divinas

The TVyNovelas Award for Best Program of Pay Television category is in the annual Premios TVyNovelas awards program for Mexican telenovelas (soap operas).

This category was previously known as Best Restricted TV Program, from 2007 to 2017.

== Winners and nominees ==
=== 2000s ===
Winner	Nominated
25th TVyNovelas Awards
Derecho de admisión	Es de noche... ¡Y ya llegué!; Furia Musical; Las hijas; Netas Divinas
26th TVyNovelas Awards
Es de noche...¡Y ya llegué!	Derecho de Admisión; Está cañón
27th TVyNovelas Awards
Netas Divinas	Es de noche... !Y ya llegué!; Está cañón

=== 2010s ===
Winner	Nominated
28th TVyNovelas Awards
Está cañón	Glam Girls; MoJoe; Netas Divinas
29th TVyNovelas Awards
Miembros al Aire	Adictos 2; Es de Noche... y ya Llegué; MoJoe; Netas Divinas
30th TVyNovelas Awards
MoJoe	Morir en Martes; Pa' la banda Night Show; SuSana Adicción
31st TVyNovelas Awards
Su Sana Adicción	Miembros al Aire; Netas Divinas
32nd TVyNovelas Awards
Miembros al Aire	Netas Divinas; Está Cañón; Pa la banda; STANDparados
33rd TVyNovelas Awards
Está cañón	STANDparados; Su Sana adicción; Mojoe
34th TVyNovelas Awards
Esta cañón	Amordidas; Miembros al aire; MoJoe; Netas divinas
35th TVyNovelas Awards
MoJoe	Es de noche… y ya llegué; Hacen y deshacen; Miembros al aire; Netas divinas
36th TVyNovelas Awards
Miembros al Aire	Está cañón; Hacen y deshacen; MoJoe; Netas divinas
37th TVyNovelas Awards
Montse y Joe	Con permiso; Game time; Miembros al aire; Netas divinas
38th TVyNovelas Awards
Netas divinas	Con permiso; Consecuencias; Miembros al aire; Terapia de shock

== Records ==
- Most awarded program: Está cañón and Miembros al Aire, 3 times.
- Most nominated program: Netas Divinas with 11 nominations.
- Most nominated program without a win: Pa' la banda Night Show and STANDparados with 2 nominations.
- Program winning after short time: Está cañón, 2 consecutive years.
- Program winning after long time: Netas divinas (2009 and 2020), 11 years' difference.
