= Dani Who? =

- Genre: Thriller
- Country of origin: Mexico
- Original language: Spanish
- No. of seasons: 1
- No. of episodes: 10

Production
- Production companies: Argos Comunicación; Viacom International Studios

Original release
- Network: Paramount Channel
- Release: November 3, 2019 – January 5, 2020

Dani Who? is a Mexican teen drama thriller produced by Argos Comunicación for Viacom International Studios. The start of production was announced at the 2019 LA Screenings on May 15, 2019, and concluded on August 6, 2019. It premiered on the Paramount Channel Latin America on November 3, 2019, and concluded on January 5, 2020. The series became available via streaming services on Amazon Prime Video on November 8, 2019. The series revolves around a group of classmates who become accomplices to the disappearance of a girl, and stars Julia Urbini, Geraldine Galván, Lucía Tinajero, Yoshira Escárrega, and Meraqui Pradis. On May 19, 2020, it was confirmed that Nickelodeon reached an agreement with ViacomCBS International Studios to acquire the rights to the series and produce a podcast and a television series adapted to the same format.

== Cast ==
- Julia Urbini as Dani Márquez
- Yoshira Escarrega as Tamara Sánchez
- Geraldine Galván as Victoria Mata
- Lucía Tinajero as Olivia Valle
- Meraqui Pradis as Lorena Ibáñez
- Rodrigo Murray as Profesor Eric Vulch
- Mario Morán as JP
- Sergio Lozano as Sam Díaz
- Juan Carlos Colombo as Don Miguel
- Mario Loría as Germán Márquez
- Lourdes Reyes as Puri Ibáñez
- Carolina Miranda as Lluvia
