= Abel (2010 film) =

2010 film by Diego Luna

- Theatrical release poster
- Directed by: Diego Luna
- Starring: Christopher Ruíz-Esparza; José María Yazpik
- Release date: 25 January 2010 (SFF)
- Running time: 82 minutes
- Country: Mexico
- Language: Spanish

Abel is a 2010 Mexican comedy-drama film directed by Diego Luna and written by Luna and Augusto Mendoza.

== Cast ==
- Christopher Ruíz-Esparza as Abel
- José María Yazpik as Anselmo
- Karina Gidi as Cecilia
- Geraldine Galván as Selene
