= Fernanda Urdapilleta =

Mexican actress, model and singer

- Born: February 17, 1998 (age 27); Mexico City, Mexico
- Occupations: Actress; model; singer
- Years active: 2006–present

Fernanda Urdapilleta (born February 17, 1998) is a Mexican actress, model and singer.

== Biography ==
Maria Fernanda Urdapilleta Foullon was born on February 17, 1998, in Mexico City, Mexico. She began her career as a participant in the children's series Plaza Sésamo produced in Mexico in 2006 by Televisa, capturing the attention of child public. In 2010, she joined the Centro de Educación Artística (CEA), run by Televisa, and had small parts in soap operas like Olvidarte jamás, La fuerza del destino, sharing credits with David Zepeda and Sandra Echeverría, and Ni contigo ni sin ti working alongside Laura Carmine, Eduardo Santamarina and Erick Elias.

After graduating from the CEA, Urdapilleta was unveiled on television playing "Jenny" in La CQ, in 2012, which was produced by Pedro Ortiz de Pinedo. For her performance, she was nominated for the Kids Choice Awards Mexico as "Favorite Actress" being the winner of the category. Urdapilleta also debuted as a singer on La CQ after releasing an album with her co-stars.

In 2016 producer Juan Osorio offered Urdapilleta a co-youth starring role in the telenovela Sueño de amor as "Salma Kuri Fierro" a role where she disclosed more, gaining a good acceptance among the young audiences and sharing credits with Betty Monroe and Cristián de la Fuente.

== Filmography ==
Film roles
Year	Title	Roles	Notes
2007	Niña que espera	Angelica	Short film
2012	Cristiada	Sandra Gorostieta	

Television roles
Year	Title	Roles	Notes
2006–2007	Plaza Sésamo	Daniela	Series regular; 68 episodes
2008–2016	La rosa de Guadalupe	Various roles	Series regular; 10 episodes
2011	La fuerza del destino	Child Judith	Episodes: "El origen de Iván" and "La amenaza de Juan Jaime"
2011	Ni contigo ni sin ti	Child Isabela	Episode: "Visita inesperada"
2012–2013	La CQ	Jenny Pinto	Main role; 99 episodes
2012–2016	Como dice el dicho	Anita Amaya Andrea	Episode: "El más amigo es traidor" Episode: "De enero a enero" Episode: "Es mejor encender una vela, que maldecir la oscuridad"
2016	Sueño de amor	Salma Kuri	Series regular; 132 episodes
2017–2018	Papá a toda madre	Liliana Turrubiates	Series regular; 96 episodes
2018	La jefa del campeón	Valeria Linares	Series regular; 61 episodes
2020–2021	100 días para enamorarnos	Lucía Sandoval Blanco	Series regular; 92 episodes
2021	Mi fortuna es amarte	Andrea Cantú Robles	Series regular
2022	Vencer la ausencia	Georgina "Gina" Miranda	Series regular
2023	Perdona nuestros pecados	Aurora Montero	Series regular

== Awards and nominations ==
Year	Award	Category	Result
2013	Kids Choice Awards México	Actriz de reparto favorita	Won
2016	Kids Choice Awards México	Revelación favorita	Won
