= Like (TV series) =

Mexican telenovela

- Genre: Telenovela
- Written by: María Cervantes Balmori; Luis Mariani; Mariana Palos
- Directed by: Luis Pardo; Eloy Ganuza
- Opening theme: "Este movimiento" by Like
- Country of origin: Mexico
- Original language: Spanish
- No. of seasons: 1
- No. of episodes: 97

Production
- Executive producer: Pedro Damián
- Producer: Juan Carlos Muñoz
- Production locations: Mexico City, Mexico; Jerusalem, Israel; Tokyo, Japan
- Production company: Televisa

Original release
- Network: Las Estrellas
- Release: 10 September 2018 – 20 January 2019

Like, la leyenda, or simply Like is a Mexican telenovela that premiered on Las Estrellas on 10 September 2018 and ended on 20 January 2019. The telenovela is produced by Pedro Damián for Televisa. The series follows the lives of thirteen students and the problems that adolescents experience during their time in high school.

== Plot ==
The telenovela narrates the experiences of a group of young people interned at the Life Institute of Knowledge and Evolution (LIKE), a prestigious and cosmopolitan educational institution, with a supposedly modern and open educational system, but in reality it is deeply traditional and schematic. In this institution, which presumes its level of vanguard, each beginning of the school year a new generation of high school students are formed with rigid and tedious routines, in addition to educational techniques that do not excite anyone. The educational plan of Like, completely obsolete, has made teachers and students apathetic and conformist. That apathetic atmosphere will be challenged by Gabriel Rey, "Gabo", an atypical teacher who will come to the school after many years of experience, and who was also a student at Like. Gabo will encourage students not to conform to what adults want to impose on them, provoking a true revolution in Like, which will generate confrontations between teachers, parents and students.

== Cast ==
=== Main ===
- Mauricio Abad as Ulises Reyes, comes from a neighborhood in Lima, Peru. He can seem aggressive and generate distrust, because he went through a very difficult situation in life by assuming the guilt for a crime he did not commit.
- Santiago Achaga as Cláudio Meyer, he is the one who gets along with everyone and does everything he can. He is very fortunate to have been born into a family of ancestry and this privilege causes him at the same time honor and guilt.
- Roberta Damián as Antonia "Tony" De Haro, she seems predestined since she was born to be a princess. However, she struggles daily to get rid of that label. She is popular and leader by nature; is a fashion lover and loves to sing.
- Macarena García as Machu Salas, has a special ability to manipulate others, she is an innate bully. Her sense of humor, black and cruel, often makes others laugh. Her presence imposes, and is the most experienced of the group in sexual matters.
- Anna Iriyama as Keiko Kobayashi, she comes from Japan by her own means, deliberately seeking to study at LIKE after an experience that threatened her life. Nobody knows her family and her past is a mystery.
- Ale Müller as Emilia Ruiz, is a teenage mother, of Mexican family but born in Texas. She does not like to be told what to do. The problems with her mother have increased by her rebellion.
- Carlos Said as León Rubio, is the son of the leader of a cartel. Despite his young age, he is completely convinced of what he wants and what he does not want for his life.
- Víctor Varona as Silverio Gil, is the new rich and although he has a lot of money, he hides his class complexes and his past of poverty with designer clothes.
- Violeta Alonso as Manuela "Manu" Gandia, is always unleashing things, especially problems. Her parents died after an argument they had with her
- Eduardo Barquín as Kevin
- Briggitte Bozzo as Kathy Alonso, a rich girl of influential and overbearing parents. In the past she was the target of Machu's bullying so she decides to take revenge. She has dominated the twins Regina and Renata whom she uses and gives orders for her benefit.
- Catalina Cardona as Jessica Martínez, she has a successful vloging channel with thousands of followers. She is a trendsetter.
- Bernardo Flores as Pablo Valentín Ferrer, his family is rich and powerful in the state of Jalisco. He wanted to get away from his suffocating family, because his dream is to become a professional dancer, he does not want to inherit the family business.
- Zuri Sasson as Daniel Cohen, he has a hereditary disease that involves the degeneration of his neurons with various effects. The fact of knowing that he is going to die leads him to behave badly, and do whatever he wants without caring about anything.
- Julia Maqueo as Regina Regil De La Reguera, a twin, rich and spoiled girl, from Kathy's group. She was the second to be born and has a slightly kinder character. She works as her sister's echo.
- Paty Maqueo as Renata Regil De La Reguera, twin of Regina. She is always looking for someone to bully. She was the first to be born, she is an advantageist, envious, easily manipulated by Kathy, but she enjoys her actions against others.
- Flávio Nogueira as Thiago Souza Peralta, is hyperactive and curious. He finds no evil in people and has the gift of seeing the good in each person. He is transparent and noble feelings.
- Diana Villalpando as Romina Flores "Romi", is observant and discreet. She understood the power and protection of the low profile, to go unnoticed by others, so she allows others to be the center of attention. She lives full of doubts and aspires to be a nun.
- Christian Chávez as Gabriel "Gabo" Rey
- Candela Márquez as Candela
- Óscar Schwebel as Humberto
- Gina Castellanos as Victoria
- Zoraida Gómez as Isadora
- Ceci de la Cueva as Sole
- Luz Aldán as Graciela "Chela"

=== Recurring ===
- Enoc Leaño as Baldomero
- Wendy Braga as Brenda
- Sahit Sosa as Abel
- Isela Vega as Eduarda
- Rodrigo Murray as Armando "El Güero" Gil
- Karla Cossío as Clara Mondragón
- Amairani as Maria Inés
- Pía Sanz as Rosario
- Lenny Zundel as Jacobo
- Bernie Paz as Rodolfo Reyes
- Rafael Nieves as Germán
- Carolina Sepúlveda as Marcela
- Sergio Kleiner as Íñigo
- Manoly Díaz as Fabrizio
- Adriana Nieto as Martha Reyes
- Gabriel Navarro as Javier
- Mar Contreras as Isaura
- Julieth Herrera as Idalia
- Gustavo Rincón as Mario
- Sebastián Gutiérrez as Jorge
- Gabriela Zamora as Rosa
- Olinka Velázquez as Silvia
- David Ramírez as Govinda
- Daphne Montesinos as Valeria
- Marcela Muñoz as Jackie
- Analay Rodriguez as Wanda
- Stephanie Saade as Yourlady
- Irving Peña as Miguel
- Jordi Rush as Pascual
- Andres Baida as Pepe Toledo
- Kevin Rogers as Sebastian
- Carlos Marmen as Felipe
- Reynaldo Rossano as Chuy
- Arturo García Tenorio as Fausto
- Alfonso Iturralde as Bernardo
- Rodrigo Massa as Richie Comanche
- Fiona Muñoz as Matilde
- Miranda Kay as Tamara

== Production ==
The first scenes were filmed in Jerusalem, Israel, in March 2018 and in April filming began in the forum 14 of Televisa San Ángel. At the end of July, the production of the first season entered its final stretch. Pedro Damián confirmed that the first season will have 97 episodes, 17 more than expected. Damián also revealed that he is already working in the second season and that in October he will travel to Japan for filming and intends to film also in Brazil. Filming of the first season ended on 9 November 2018. On 14 November 2018, the magazine People en Español, confirmed that there are no plans to continue doing more seasons due to the discrete audience data, however the musical group will continue.

=== Casting ===
To choose the protagonists of the series, the production team traveled all over the world to perform casting, the series will feature actors from different parts of the world such as Israel, Japan, United States, Spain, Colombia and Peru.

== Musical group ==
A band was formed with eight of the main actors in the series. The members are Ale Müller, Anna Iriyama, Carlos Said, Macarena García, Mauricio Abad, Roberta Damián, Santiago Achaga and Victor Varona. The band sings songs presented on the show. Like's debut performance was at Premios Juventud on 22 July 2018 in Miami. They performed their first single, "Este Movimiento". The official music video for "Este Movimiento" premiered on 10 July 2018 and was officially released for digital download and streaming on 20 July 2018. On 14 November 2018, it was announced that Ale Müller and Carlos Said left the band. An Extended play containing 4 songs from the series was released on 22 February 2019.

== Rating ==
Season	Episodes	First aired		Last aired	
Season	Episodes	Date	Premiere Ratings	Date	Finale Ratings
1	97	10 September 2018	2.9	20 January 2019	TBD

== Episodes ==
No.	Title	Original release date
1	"¿Quién grabó a Antonia borracha para balconearla en la escuela?"	10 September 2018
After vacations, the students of Like return to school and hold a welcome party that gets out of control. Antonia begins to feel attraction for Ulises. León is desperate after knowing that someone stole his money. Ulises is worried since his mother's health does not improve. Antonia gets drunk and does not remember anything of what happened the previous night, until a compromising video begins to circulate where she is the protagonist.
2	"Antonia y Ulises, casi se besan"	11 September 2018
Cláudio accuses Ulises of having filming Antonia's compromising video. Ulises tells Emilia what happened with Tony after the party. Antonia finds out that Ulises was not the one who recorded her video, and that he was the one who took her safely to her bedroom. After Antonia dedicates a song to Ulises, he tries to kiss her, but they are interrupted. Cláudio suspects that Antonia is in love with Ulises. Emilia discovers through the news that León is the son of a drug trafficker. Thanks to Silverio, Machu and Manuela become friends.
3	"Emilia tendrá que hacerse cargo de su hija"	12 September 2018
Tired of being her cover, Emilia's mother gives her daughter to finally take responsibility and stop pretending to be a good girl. A parent's meeting is held. Cláudio finds Rodolfo robbing. Machu fears being pregnant by Silverio, so her mother forces her to take a pregnancy test. Antonia confesses to Ulises the love she feels for him. Manuela finds the culprit who leaked Tony's video.
4	"Tony y Ulises ya son novios, pero ¿ya tuvieron relaciones?"	13 September 2018
Tony accepts being Ulises' girlfriend, but the rumors at school are that they already had sex. Sole discovers Emilia with her daughter. León decides to help Emilia and her daughter, so she will not be discovered. Cláudio finds a song and a letter. Silverio exploits every time someone talks about his parents' divorce, and although he seems strong, he has a hidden weakness.
5	"Machu se pasa de lanza con Silverio"	14 September 2018
Silverio's mother suffers a great depression since his father left her. After finding him with Manuela, Machu decides to take revenge on Silverio by posting a picture of his mother on social networks. Cláudio follows Ulises, and discovers that he was a delinquent. Manuela confronts Jessica for stealing her video.
6	"Machu muere por León y lo provoca"	17 September 2018
Machu is crazy about León and will do everything to conquer him, like inviting him to a party, caress him and even kiss him. Jessica is in trouble, from the videos she uploads to social networks, she supports her family. Manuela tries to make Jessica understand that her family only takes advantage of her. Antonia learns that her brother was admitted to a school for special children. Gabriel and Sole search for clues of the letter and find a diskette. León helps Daniel to fulfill his dream. Ulises suspects that Antonia still loves Claudio.
7	"Santo Tomás une a Romi con Silverio"	18 September 2018
Romi feels lonely, misunderstood by her family. When trying to save her bird, Santo Tomás, she puts her life at risk. Silverio runs to help her and saves her life. This awakens something in Romi. Claudio devises a plan to convince Clara to tell him where she interned Martín. Tony takes Martín without warning. Gabriel discovers the content of the diskette. Ulises realizes that his father does not take care of his mother. Isadora tries to convince Gabriel to look at other women to forget his past.
8	"Emilia vs. Machu, ¿Quién ganará el duelo de rap?"	19 September 2018
Machu gets drunk and out of jealousy challenges Emilia to a rap duel. Someone stole Manuela's computer, and she will be willing to do everything to recover it. Toni's father explodes when he discovers where Martín was sent and asks for his wife's divorce. Isadora seeks reconciliation with Gabriel. Machu makes a confession to Gabriel. Daniel knows the secret that Pablo has with Sebastián.
9	"¿Tony se hizo un aborto?"	20 September 2018
On WhatsApp, Clara asks Tony to explain why she had an abortion. Ulises, seeing the conversation, claims his girlfriend for hiding the secret. Daniel wants Pablo to reveal his secret. Because of Pablo and Humberto, Victoria decides to suspend music classes causing the anger of all students of Like. Humberto receives a musical session from the students. Clara asks Germán not to abandon her. Daniel knows that Pablo is the traitor.
10	"#TeamLechu: Por fin se besaron"	21 September 2018
Abel enters LIKE to say goodbye to his brother León. He helps him fight for what he wants, and one of those things is to conquer Machu. Thanks to a peanut trail that causes them to meet, Machu asks León if he wants to know who she likes, but he goes ahead and kisses her. Ulises clarifies Antonia's truth and her mother humiliates him in front of Cláudio and his father. Kathy takes revenge on Machu. Pablo reveals his guilt to Gabriel. Humberto devises a plan to remove the internet from school.
11	"Los papás de Tony rechazan a Ulises"	24 September 2018
Tony introduces Ulises as her boyfriend to her parents, but they do not want him for their daughter and they make him leave. Daniel suffers a seizure and wishes to advance his death. Abel wants to leave his father's organization, but for León this would endanger his brother, so he does something to prevent it. Gabriel holds a concert at school for the students to demonstrate their musical talents. Due to the concert, Gabriel has problems with the Council. Martha visits Ulises at LIKE.
12	"Claudio invita a Emilia a su casa, ¿qué pasara?"	25 September 2018
Emilia manages to get Claudio to invite her to his house to do the work that Isadora left them. Ulises tells his father that he is ashamed of him. Clara decides to fight for the custody of Antonia and her brother. Antonia rescues Daniel from drowning in the school pool. Because of the guilt he feels after Tony saved his life, Daniel decides to confess that he was the one who recorded her compromising video. Pablo joins Jessica and Manuela in their project. Gabo reproaches Sole that she no longer cares about the past.
13	"Silverio besa a Machu a la fuerza"	26 September 2018
Silverio urges Machu to leave León and kisses her so she can return with him. Machu rejects him, without realizing that Kathy is recording them. Ulises invites Antonia to his house to eat, when he notices Machu's taunts, decides that Antonia has to go. Daniel confesses that he is afraid, but that he is willing to fight against the disease that is killing him. Humberto learns that a stranger walked through LIKE and Victoria discovers that Chuy let Machu out. Isadora motivates Gabo to look for Luca. The students who stayed at LIKE try to open the music room. Chuy is fired from LIKE.
14	"Claudio besa a Emilia, pero ¿logrará olvidar a Tony?"	27 September 2018
Emilia and Claudio are carried away by their instincts. Kathy blackmails Machu. Antonia's father is opposed to his daughter living in Ulises' surroundings, forbidding her to be with him. Martha tells Ulises that he and Tony are not the same. Marcela asks Manuela for help for Romina. The silent party is held in the music room. Sebastián devises a plan to make Pablo jealous. Kathy tries to spend the night with Daniel, but things do not go as she expected.
15	"Ulises y Tony truenan"	28 September 2018
In the middle of class, Ulises complains to Tony for having made a meme of his mother's tamales, and this sparks a fight that ends their relationship. Emilia begins to get excited with Claudio, when he does not feel the same for her. Sebastián confesses to Jessica that he does not feel anything for her. Silverio fears that he loses his place in school when he learns that his father has lost his job. Machu takes revenge on Daniel for rejecting Kathy. Pablo infuriates with Jessica for her prejudices. Gabo and Sole follow the track of Luca.
16	"Claudio manda a Emilia a la friendzone"	1 October 2018
Ulises and León make a warning to Claudio. Tony and Ulises are now just friends. Jessica discovers Pablo's secret. Gabo opens wounds from Sole's past. Claudio asks Emilia to take some time because he is really in love with Tony. Tony offers her support to Emilia, but she despises her. Ulises enters Tony's house to offer his services to pay his debts, but incidentally steals something from Clara.
17	"Ya sabemos qué enfermedad tiene Romina"	2 October 2018
Romina and Manuela go to collect the clinical analyzes and there they find out that Romina has HPV. Machu is released from Kathy's blackmail. Humberto questions Victoria's decisions as a principal, the students sabotage his plans. The Council gives Gabo an ultimatum. León learns that Machu and Silverio kissed, but Machu looks for the opportunity to explain how things happened. Clara realizes the supposed theft of Ulises in her house.
18	"Romi se acostó con... ¡Pepe Toledo!"	3 October 2018
Romina confesses that she lost her virginity with Pepe Toledo, Manuela plans to take revenge against the boys. Clara says that Ulises entered to rob her house and demands his expulsion from LIKE, but Ulises has proof that he is not a thief. Daniel apologizes to Romina. Machu discovers that Leon is hiding things from her. The students make an emotional tribute to Luca. Everything is ready for the trip to Israel and the name of those who will attend is revealed. Germán is happy to know that Claudio will go with Antonia to Israel.
19	"Claudio sufre una sobredosis, ¿qué pasará?"	4 October 2018
Claudio begins to show an addiction to the pills that Silverio gave him. Humberto can not go to Israel, so Gabriel will be the tutor of the trip. Jessica complains to her family for leaving her without savings and without a trip. Claudio confesses to Antonia the love he feels for her. Manuela rebukes Silverio and Daniel for their treatment of women. Emilia finds Claudio fainting in the music room because of the pills he takes.
20	"Los chicos de Like llegan a Israel"	5 October 2018
Tony, Machu, León, Silverio, among other LIKE students, arrived to Israel through the exchange and, on their first day, they visit some parts of Jerusalem. Thanks to Humberto and his anger against Gabriel, Claudio missed the trip to Israel. Daniel is reunited with his roots, and with part of his family in Israelite lands. At Like the students organize the welcome party for the Israeli students. Bernardo is angry because the students traveled alone.
21	"¿Emilia le confesará a Claudio que tiene una hija?"	8 October 2018
Claudio meets Martina, but Emilia does not confess the truth and her mother assures her that there is nothing worse than denying a child. Daniel will be treated for his illness in Israel. Claudio suspects that Ulises was the one who stole his passport. Romina is moved to follow the path of Jesus in Israel. Ulises is sincere with Germán about his relationship with Tony. The group of Like puts rhythm with their songs in the streets of Israel.
22	"Desde Israel, Tony despierta los celos de Ulises y Claudio"	9 October 2018
Tony has made a new friend in Israel and someone took photos and sent them to Ulises and Claudio to provoke them. Manuela enters into crisis by not finding Daniel, and is forced to reveal his health problems. Ulises prevents Claudio from taking drugs, to perform in the game where LIKE manages to beat Pattinson. Daniel is disappointed in Manuela for revealing his secret. Igor is furious with the students for having escaped. Thiago tells Jesica the secret why he can not have a relationship with any girl. Emilia gets upset because Claudio does not pay attention to her.
23	"Emilia se besa con Jared, ¿olvidará a Claudio?"	10 October 2018
Emilia is determined to fight for Claudio, but Jared wants to conquer her and both kiss. Machu publishes photos on behalf of Tony. Claudio gets drunk and kisses Emilia again. A mysterious man follows León. Silverio gets drunk on the yacht, so he falls into the water without knowing how to swim. Romina does not think twice and jumps behind him to save his life. Ulises offers his support to Claudio, and makes him see that he is falling into addictions. Victoria stops being principal of LIKE.
24	"Daniel no encuentra la cura en Israel"	11 October 2018
Daniel traveled to Israel only to suffer the disappointment of knowing that he is not fit for the treatment of his illness. Romina discovers that Pepe Toledo flirts with Jessica, but does not want to reveal her secret to save her. Igor loses patience with the students. Victoria proposes Gabo as the new principal of LIKE.
25	"¡Pelea en Like! Emilia Vs. Tony, ¿quién ganará?"	12 October 2018
The students return from Israel. Tony confronts Emilia for deleting the message she sent to Claudio, but Emilia replies that she is tired of her wanting to be the center of attention. Humberto is the new principal of Like and he imposes new rules, the students protest. Romina warns Jessica about the intentions of Pepe Toledo.
26	"Emilia y Tony se enfrentarán en un intercolegial de baile"	15 October 2018
The war between Emilia and Tony is still declared and now they will face each other in a dance intercollegiate within LIKE. Humberto abuses his power as principal by forcing the teachers to search the rooms of the students to remove their cell phones. Ulises wants Tony and Emilia to fix their differences. Gabriel finds a way to recover the music room. Ulises confesses to Tony that he has not been able to forget her, that there is no one else that causes him the same feeling. Manuela goes on a strike to make sure the students do not wear the uniform anymore.
27	"Keiko flecha a Ulises"	16 October 2018
Keiko arrives at LIKE. Ulises, who is the first to see her, is shocked by her beauty. Gabo tells the students to demand their rights. Emilia asks Kathy to be part of her dance team. Jackie is in LIKE so León can communicate with his dad. Maria Elena demands Machu to end her relationship with León. Martin puts Tony in an uncomfortable situation. Tony and Emilia come to blows, after a misunderstanding. Thiago steals the math exam.
28	"Tony besa a Claudio, ¿por culpa de Keiko?"	17 October 2018
Ulises has communication difficulties with Keiko. Thiago helps Emilia not to lose her scholarship by sharing the answers of the math exam. Tony is jealous of the new friendship that Ulises and Keiko have and then kisses Claudio in the pool. Gabriel gives Sole evidence that Luca is alive. Tony threatens Emilia with revealing to Claudio what she did with the audio note.
29	"Emilia le tiende una trampa a Tony en el intercolegial de baile"	18 October 2018
Emilia, believing that Tony will accuse her with Claudio, boycotts Tony's dance. Ulises finds out about the relationship between Tony and Claudio, and although it breaks his heart, he wishes them the best together. Brenda discovers Jackie in LIKE. Adolfo asks Ulises to visit his mother. Silverio confronts Pepe Toledo.
30	"Inicia una huelga de silencio en Like"	19 October 2018
Emilia was the one who made Tony look bad in front of the whole institute, so Antonia takes revenge by telling Claudio the truth. Unintentionally, Tony causes a revolution in Like after her boycott in the dance intercollegiate, so all the girls decide to go on a silent strike to end Humberto's domination. Thiago asks Pepe for advice to be like him. Chela suspects that there is a romance between Humberto and Jackie. Romina informs Pepe that she contracted a sexual virus. León escapes to surprise Machu, and have an incredible night. Emilia reveals that she is responsible for the message on the flag. Jackie resigns, once she has fulfilled her mission.
31	"Keiko esconde un secreto"	22 October 2018
Romina suspects Keiko is a spy and almost discovers that Keiko hides money and several passports. Tony finds out that Claudio suffers from an addiction to pills, thanks to his father's severe scolding. Pablo defends Manuela from his parents, when she declares that she is bisexual. Humberto will not let Ulises communicate with his parents. Baldomero asks León to do illegal things.
32	"Tony descubre el secreto de Emilia"	23 October 2018
Tony and Machu think that Emilia is a drug dealer. Tony spies on Emilia to have proof that she is a dealer, but actually discovers that she has a daughter. Humberto does not give in to Ulises' request. Ulises is desperate to know about his mom, so Keiko helps him communicate with his family. Jessica discovers that Pepe Toledo despises her. The strike of towels causes that Humberto yields to the requests of the students. Victoria feels bad when she sees Chuy working as a franelero. Pablo confesses to Manuela that he is gay.
33	"Muere la mamá de Ulises"	24 October 2018
With the help of Emilia and Keiko, Ulises manages to escape LIKE to visit his mother. Martha loses the battle against cancer, before dying she asks Ulises to continue his studies. Manuela devises a plan to help Pablo come out of the closet. Tony loses her virginity with Claudio, and it was not what she expected. Manuela's laptop breaks down because Daniel did not take good care of it.
34	"Tony consuela a Ulises por la muerte de su madre, ¿revivirá el amor?"	25 October 2018
Emilia knows what Ulises is going through, and asks Tony to accompany him in his pain. Ulises wants to leave school to get a job, but Tony begs him to continue studying, for her and for his mother. Íñigo and the students return Manu's memories. The students leave Humberto in ridicule with some firemen strippers. Silverio suspects that Romina is interested in him.
35	"Claudio muere de celos por culpa de Ulises"	26 October 2018
Ulises reacts violently against Humberto, so he is expelled from LIKE. Faced with this situation, students join to get Humberto fired and try to get Ulises back. León refuses to do what Baldomero demands. Claudio can not believe that Tony went to console Ulises at his mother's funeral, so he asks Ulises to stay away from her. Rodolfo asks Ulises for help to stop his alcoholism. Claudio asks Lalo for drugs.
36	"Ulises y Tony casi se besan"	29 October 2018
Victoria returns as the principal of LIKE, and one of her first decisions is to accept that Ulises returns to school. Tony is happy that Ulises is back in LIKE and when he confesses that he missed her a lot, they almost kiss. Claudio exploits in jealousy to see how Tony receives Ulises. Rodolfo needs money to pay for Martha's treatment. Machu finds out that her mother wants to send her to Ireland.
37	"Todos descubren que Ulises estuvo en la cárcel"	30 October 2018
The charity fundraiser is held at LIKE, everyone is very enthusiastic about the donations. Ulises' dad arrives drunk at LIKE and reveals to everyone that his son spent time in prison. Claudio steals the money from Antonia's box to buy drugs. León decides to leave Machu to avoid her being sent to Ireland.
38	"Culpan a Ulises de robo en Like"	31 October 2018
Tony discovers the theft of the fundraiser money. In order to get rid of guilt, Lalo sows evidence among Ulises' clothing to be blamed for the theft. Claudio does not have the courage to confess that it was he who stole the money from the fundraiser. Keiko climbs into the ring to defend Daniel from wrestlers. Machu announces the end of her relationship with León.
39	"Machu besa a Silverio para darle celos a León"	1 November 2018
In order to get revenge on León, Machu kisses Silverio, but he confuses things and wants to win her back. Ulises manages to find the key to the lock in Lalo's room. Lalo threatens Claudio, so he confesses to Victoria that he was the one who stole the money. Given her imminent trip to Ireland, Machu says goodbye to the students and reveals the jokes she has made.
40	"Keiko le aplica una llave a Ulises... ¡y lo besa!"	2 November 2018
Machu finds out about León's reasons for kissing Emilia and that he organized her farewell party. After wrestling classes in LIKE are implemented, Emilia and Machu face each other in the ring. Ulises is surprised to see how Keiko knocked out Tony in wrestling, so he asks her to teach him tricks, but she knocks him down and takes the opportunity to kiss him. Abel protects León from the fury of Baldomero, after depositing his money in other accounts. Daniel asks Victoria to let him travel to Israel so he can attend his girlfriend's funeral.
41	"Daniel intenta suicidarse"	5 November 2018
Daniel steals the surveillance team's gun in order to end his suffering. Claudio points out that he is a drug addict, but that he is not a dealer. Claudio could go to prison for the alleged drug trafficking at LIKE. Claudio and Lalo fight. Keiko kisses Ulises to try to make him fall in love. Jessica suspects that Romina is in love with Silverio. Antonia feels bad when she discovers that Ulises is dating Keiko.
42	"Claudio es recluido en un centro de rehabilitación"	6 November 2018
After his father turned his back on him, Claudio could be sent to prison. Tony does not leave him alone, and with the help of her dad, he gets sent to a youth community to rehabilitate himself. While Victoria rebukes Manu for alarming LIKE with the possible suicide of Daniel, he is forced to reveal his illness to the students.
43	"¿Machu y León tuvieron relaciones?"	7 November 2018
Machu wants her first time with León to be incredible, so she organizes a plan for this to happen. In order for Claudio to return to LIKE, Tony and Ulises seek to unmask Lalo, the real drug dealer. Keiko faces Tony, and makes it clear that she is now Ulises' girlfriend, and will take care of their relationship above all things. Kevin will do everything to hurt Claudio, to try to stay with Tony. Emilia visits Claudio at the youth community and tells him how much she likes him.
44	"León descubre el secreto de la familia de Machu"	8 November 2018
León mistakenly listens to the secret that María Inés has kept for Machu for years and that could change her whole life, Soledad is Machu's true mother. Although asked to stay out of the issue, he is determined to reveal the truth. Ulises and Emilia inquire if Lalo is the dealer in LIKE, for which they interrogate those who have bought pills from him.
45	"Cincuenta sombras de Keiko"	9 November 2018
In order to help Claudio, Keiko puts together a plan to unmask Lalo, which involves ropes, torture and more. Thanks to León's trap, Victoria discovers that the real culprit of drug trafficking in LIKE, is Lalo, so Claudio's innocence is confirmed. León informs Sole that he will reveal her secret to Machu, but Sole tells him that she will be the one to tell her that she is her mother.
46	"Claudio descubre a Tony con Kevin"	12 November 2018
Kevin takes advantage of Tony's distraction to make everyone believe they have a romantic relationship. Javier asks his son Claudio for forgiveness for not supporting him or believing in him, and on his return to LIKE, Claudio is received with a lot of emotion and love. Claudio discovers that Tony is flirting with Kevin.
47	"León amenaza a Sole con decirle la verdad a Machu"	13 November 2018
León can not silence the truth anymore, so he demands Soledad talk to Machu or he will. Claudio is angry with Kevin, when he mentions that he gave Tony comfort while he was not there. Machu finds out that Abel is involved in drugs and communicates it to León.
48	"Gabo ya sabe la verdad, ¿será el papá de Machu?"	14 November 2018
Sole asks Gabriel to prevent Machu from seeing the envelope that León asked for, but León is not willing to be quiet any longer. Gabo discovers that María Inés is not Machu's mother and will question Sole about the truth. Jessica's virtual boyfriend knows that she has talked to Kevin, so he demands that she send him more intimate photos to forgive her. Jessica acting without thinking, puts her image at risk.
49	"Emilia salva a Claudio de recaer en las drogas"	15 November 2018
Claudio finds some pills in his backpack and is about to relapse, but Emilia saves him and tells him that she will help him in his recovery. Claudio thanks her for all her support, while Tony thinks that Emilia only does it to conquer him. María Inés threatens León with sending Machu away if he reveals her secret, Gabo inquires with Pascual who is Machu's father.
50	"¿Quién es el supervisor de Like?"	16 November 2018
After the lawsuit and the alarms that have been lit in the school, the disciplinary commission decides to send a supervisor. Victoria prepares everything, without expecting that Humberto is the new supervisor. Candela finds the food that Jessica hides to not have to eat, so she asks her to promise that she will go to therapy, in exchange not to tell Victoria. Gabo approaches Machu with the intention of getting to know her better. Soledad devises a plan to take Machu's custody from her mother.
51	"Kevin intenta abusar de Tony"	19 November 2018
Kevin will not allow Tony to humiliate him, so he takes advantage of her vulnerability and tries to sexually abuse her. Emilia is willing to do anything for Claudio, but he tells her that although he likes her, he is in love with Tony. Humberto returns to LIKE to assess the irregularities at the institute. The teachers fear that because of the students they will get fired. Gabriel asks Soledad if he is Machu's father.
52	"Kevin es medio hermano de Claudio"	20 November 2018
Claudio is sad to learn that Antonia forgot his birthday. Claudio's father gives him a new car to celebrate his birthday. Kevin, in front of all the students, shows a picture of his father and reveals that he and Claudio are sons of the same man. Tony has an approach with Ulises, to whom she confesses that she can not end her relationship with Claudio because she does not want to hurt him.
53	"¿Descubrirá Machu la verdad?"	21 November 2018
León tells Emilia that he's tired of hiding Machu's secret, but Machu listens to them speak. Keiko learns that Ulises and Tony kissed in Victoria's office, so she prepares a surprise to remind him of her love. Ulises thanks her for everything she has done for him, but he makes it clear that he can only see her as a friend. Claudio and Kevin confront Javier for his lies of so many years so that they could not meet each other. Isaura and Rosario try to solve their differences, but things do not go as expected.
54	"Machu ya sabe que Sole es su mamá"	22 November 2018
Sole decides to confess to Machu that she is her mother. Machu does not take it well, and with León's help, she escapes from LIKE so she does not know more about her family. After their reconciliation, Claudio and Kevin fight to blows.
55	"Machu y León ya tuvieron relaciones"	23 November 2018
While everyone at LIKE is worried about them, Machu and León spend a romantic moment in a cabin. Claudio believes that his relationship with Tony has never worked. Emilia kisses Claudio and tries to convince him to give himself a chance with her, while Ulises does the same with Tony, even though she does not want to see Claudio suffer. Victoria threatens Kevin with expelling him from school if he does not change his behavior.
56	"Tony no da una en el amor"	26 November 2018
Claudio's situation with his family has distracted him from many things, including his relationship with Tony. Tony does not want to go out with Ulises to avoid harming Claudio, but discovers that Claudio wanted to end their relationship. Manuela and Jessica get Pablo an audition to realize his dream of being a dancer. Machu, with the help of Daniel and Keiko, plans to take revenge on Sole and María Inés. Rosario decides to divorce Javier. Tony is filled with happiness knowing that her parents have decided not to separate.
57	"Todos saben que León es hijo de narco"	27 November 2018
León is in serious trouble, after it is rumored at LIKE that his family are narcos. Machu is furious when she learns that Chela is guilty of having thrown away her father's ashes. Tony promises to Ulises that the next day she will break up with Claudio. Luca is alive and is back at LIKE with a new identity, Marcos Santo Domingo. He points out to Machu and León that he owns the song they made viral and threatens to sue them for stealing his song.
58	"Sole y Gabo se reencuentran con Luca"	28 November 2018
Luca is reunited with Sole and Gabo, who demand explanations for having disappeared. After making Emilia hopeful by deciding to end his relationship, Claudio begs Tony not to break up. Antonia confesses to Machu the immense love she feels for Ulises.
59	"Luca es el papá de Machu"	29 November 2018
Gabo reveals to Sole that he knows what happened between her and Luca, when they were still dating. Sole confesses to Luca that he is Machu's father and that, due to his disappearance, he missed Machu growing up. Keiko tells Claudio that Ulises and Tony kissed. Manuela devises a plan for Pablo to achieve his dream of being a great dancer.
60	"Machu ya sabe toda la verdad"	30 November 2018
Machu does not agree that Luca takes away the song, and believes that Soledad is on his side. To her surprise, by questioning Sole again, she finds out that Luca is her father. Emilia will be honest with Claudio and will make a proposal now that he has broken up with Tony. Renata suspects that Regina is interested in Manuela. Ulises asks Keiko to forgive him for not being the boyfriend she expected. Silverio is surprised to learn that Romina wants to enter a convent.
61	"Machu no logra perdonar que Luca la abandonara"	3 December 2018
The students carry out the talent contest in the company of their parents. Machu can not forgive that Luca had abandoned her as a child and calls him an idiot. Romina is accepted into the convent, to fulfill her dream of being closer to God. Rosa's heart breaks when she sees El Güero kissing Candela.
62	"Ulises defiende a Antonio de los ataques"	4 December 2018
Claudio explains to Tony that having their parents in the same place is a good time to tell them that they are no longer dating. Antonia is accused of being a liar and of using boys at her convenience, but Ulises is armed with courage and defends her against the attacks against her. Machu continues assimilating that Luca is her father, just when trying to forgive him, she finds out that he has another family in Spain. Kathy spies on León and Emilia, and discovers Machu's secrets. Antonia carries out a plan for Machu to reconcile with her family. Silverio tries to comfort his mother.
63	"Kathy revela el secreto de Machu"	5 December 2018
Kathy humiliates Machu in front of the whole school and reveals that Luca is her dad, but Kathy suffers the consequences. When Humberto finds out that Luca is Machu’s father, he provokes him and they end up in a fight with blows. Victoria alerts parents by telling them that their children are involved in legal problems. Baldomero warns León that he will disappear all those who appear with him in the video of Luca's song, for the safety of his family.
64	"Kevin comete un robo y es descubierto"	6 December 2018
Rodolfo is accused of stealing a ring from Claudio's parents. Kevin is suspicious, so Claudio follows him and discovers that he stole the ring. Germán points out to Tony that it is not a good idea to have broken up with Claudio for Ulises. Kathy suffers to see the scorn that all her classmates do to her.
65	"Thiago traiciona a Silverio"	7 December 2018
Thiago tells El Güero about Silverio's plans to separate him from Wanda and remove Pepe Toledo from his team. Machu asks Luca to give her the song in exchange for an opportunity to spend time with her. Daniel looks for the way for Keiko to forgive him, and with the help of Emilia and Silverio, he organizes a surprise birthday party for her. Luca does not want the students to go through the same thing he went through, so he asks them to fight for their dreams. Chela discovers Humberto on an online dating website. Sole asks Luca to register Machu legally as his daughter.
66	"Silverio trata de golpear a Thiago"	10 December 2018
Silverio resents Thiago for revealing to his father about wanting to dedicate himself to music and tries to fight him in front of his classmates. Everything is ready for Keiko's surprise party, Emilia will be in charge of music for the party, her mother calls to inform her that her daughter is sick, but she prefers to stay at the party than to take care of her. Silverio declares his love to Romina so she does not leave LIKE.
67	"El secreto de Emilia es descubierto"	11 December 2018
The party of Keiko is a success, although little by little everything gets out of hand. The whole party discovers that Emilia has a daughter. Kevin is discovered by Jessica. Sole and Luca ask Gabo for forgiveness for having betrayed him.
68	"Machu y Emilia se agarran a golpes"	12 December 2018
After discovering her secret, Claudio gets angry with Emilia for having hidden that she has a daughter. Machu mocks Emilia for being a single mother but Emilia defends herself and they take hold of blows and insults. Kevin convinces Jessica not to accuse him for having asked for nude photos with a fake identity.
69	"Romi y Silverio ya son novios"	13 December 2018
Silverio announces Romina as the new queen of LIKE, she is already his girlfriend and wants everyone to know. Kevin warns Pablo to stick to the consequences if he puts Jessica against him. Emilia's mother is tired of Emilia putting everything over her daughter, so she will fight for Martina's custody. Kevin decides to speak and confess to Jessica that he was not the one who threatened her through social networks. Pablo suffers knowing that his father does not accept that he is a dancer.
70	"Manuela acepta ser novia de Regina"	14 December 2018
Regina decides not to hide her feelings and tells Manuela that she likes her, she corresponds with a kiss and they decide to have a relationship. Victoria discovers that Thiago is married. Romina breaks up with Silverio. Machu is filled with happiness knowing that Sole and Luca have decided to register her as their daughter.
71	"Emilia secuestra a su hija"	17 December 2018
Emilia goes into despair because she can not see her daughter. With the help of Claudio, they carry out a plan to recover Martina and take her to LIKE, where everyone will meet her. María Inés learns that, thanks to a false dating profile created by Machu, she was able to meet Pascual.
72	"León descubre el secreto de Keiko"	18 December 2018
León discovers Keiko's various passports, so she is forced to tell her past and why she arrived to LIKE. Emilia, with the help of her friends, takes care of and hides her daughter Martina in LIKE. Emilia and Claudio were about to be discovered with Martina in the basement. Machu cries disconsolately knowing that if she accepts Sole as her real mother María Inés will get away from her.
73	"¿Keiko intentó suicidarse?"	19 December 2018
León insists on knowing Keiko's truth, so she confesses that she was about to commit suicide in order not to get married. Since Clara has found her daughter very close to Ulises, Tony asks Pablo to be her fake boyfriend. Despite not knowing the reason for their absence, Gabriel helps Emilia and Claudio to submit their final exam. Jessica discovers that Fabrizio is the real Omar. Romina is saddened to learn that her father is moving to another city. Isadora decides to quit LIKE to start a new life.
74	"Emilia confiesa en Like que es mamá"	20 December 2018
Emilia can no longer hide her secret, so she confesses to Victoria and Bernardo that the baby who is in LIKE is her daughter. Claudio, Kevin and Emilia help Jessica escape from Fabrizio. Jessica is armed with courage to report the harassment she suffered from him. Victoria explodes against this act, which is why Fabrizio is fired from LIKE.
75	"Expulsan a Emilia de Like"	21 December 2018
For lying and hiding that she had a daughter, Emilia is expelled from LIKE. Now she will have to convince the council to stay. Sole does everything to recover Emilia's scholarship, but only gets time to find a place for her to live. Luca says goodbye to Machu, but promises to return.
76	"Emilia corta con Claudio"	24 December 2018
After being expelled from LIKE, Emilia decides to embark on a new path only she and her daughter Martina, which implies ending their relationship with Claudio, who is devastated. Emilia's friends protest the injustice of having withdrawn the scholarship just for being a mom. Emilia's mother asks Victoria for help to take Martina away. León confronts Machu for harming Keiko with her jealousy.
77	"Emilia se queda en Like"	25 December 2018
After Emilia accepted the support and understanding of Claudio, the rest of the students decide to make a protest and tell Bernardo and Victoria to take it as a message to young people who are going through the same. Victoria and Bernardo accept that Emilia stays in LIKE. Keiko confronts Daniel for having ripped her drawings. Machu announces to María Inés that she no longer wants to be her daughter, but Sole and Luca’s daughter
78	"Hackean Like"	26 December 2018
León and Silverio hack into the school network to be able to put together a big party. Romina discovers that Marcela, her mother, was the one who sent the photos to Brígida. Humberto checks Keiko's locker by surprise. Machu decides to accept Sole as her mother and start a new life together.
79	"Los alumnos toman el control en Like"	27 December 2018
As all the teachers went to a bar, the students seized LIKE to put on a party. Romina decides to stop living with her mother and go live with Felipe, her father. Ulises prepares a romantic surprise for Tony, but she finds him with Matilde. Under the influence of alcohol, Machu does not tolerate her jealousy when she sees León with Keiko and ends their relationship.
80	"Kevin sorprende a Machu y Claudio besándose"	28 December 2018
Machu believes that León has something to do with Keiko, after several more glasses of alcohol, she is sure that Claudio would be the perfect boyfriend and she lets him know with a kiss. Jessica sets a trap for Fabrizio and gets him arrested so he does not hurt her or anyone else. Rosario surprisingly visits Claudio in LIKE.
81	"Claudio enfrenta a sus padres por defender a Emilia"	31 December 2018
Claudio can not stand that his mother speaks ill of Emilia and decides to present her as his girlfriend. Kevin blackmails Claudio with the photo of the kiss he gave to Machu. Victoria becomes angry and loses control over the theft of LIKE's pantry and Eduarda already knows who is responsible for the theft.
82	"Machu pasa su primera noche en el depa de Sole"	1 January 2019
Machu agrees to go live with Sole, although she is accustomed to the luxuries she had with María Inés, she makes a great effort to adapt to her new life. María Inés demands to get Sole fired from LIKE.
83	"¿Daniel está al borde de la muerte?"	2 January 2019
Daniel confesses to his father that his illness has worsened and he is afraid of dying soon. The students are worried because Thiago has lost his scholarship, but he does not want scandals that affect him even more. Manuela abuses the consumption of alcohol to not feel anything for Regina.
84	"Romi y Silverio sufren un accidente"	3 January 2019
Surprisingly, Abel asks Isadora for marriage. Silverio invites Romina to his house. She has the courage to confess to Silverio that she has HPV, before having sex but they suffer a car accident. Thiago stays in LIKE, because the students have gotten the money to pay his tuition.
85	"¿Se salvará Romi de la muerte?"	4 January 2019
After Romina and Silverio's accident, Romina is unconscious and everyone fears for her life. Machu discovers that she is not the only daughter Luca has.
86	"Los Kathy Choice Awards"	7 January 2019
Kathy gives out awards in LIKE, ranging from the couple of the year, to the most fit student. Pablo wants to finish with the lie that he set up with Tony about their relationship, so he confesses that he is gay. Machu looks for her half sister, and tells her the truth to destroy Luca.
87	"Machu le tiende una trampa a Luca"	8 January 2019
Machu is determined to take revenge on her dad, so she sets a trap with his other family. An angel has appeared to Romina, who tells her to follow her signal and go to the convent, but neither Silverio nor Marcela believe her. Kevin wants Claudio's parents to separate, to make his brother's life impossible. Emilia's mother discovers that Martina has been exposed by her and her uncle in the wrestling arena.
88	"Regina corta a Manuela"	9 January 2019
Regina ends with Manuela because of her insecurity, so she takes refuge in alcohol and persuades Silverio to go to a bar. Emilia warns her mother that she will accuse her of kidnapping if she dares to take Martina away. Claudio and Kevin are reconciled and it seems that they have left behind arguments and blackmail. Isadora asks Abel to meet his family, which he flatly refuses.
89	"Emilia pierde la custodia de su hija"	10 January 2019
Emilia is very happy with Claudio and Martina, until her mother arrives with the papers that name her as guardian of the girl. Thiago flees from LIKE, but before, he reveals to Silverio that he is guilty of filtering the messages against El Güero. Isadora, with the help of Machu, discovers Abel's family secret.
90	"Suspenden a Tony de Like"	11 January 2019
Matilde's plan to separate Tony from Ulises takes effect: Victoria suspends Tony from LIKE for being "Revoluchic", the terrorist of the social networks. Machu leaves behind the problems of the past, and accepts the paperwork to be Sole's daughter.
91	"Ulises le tiende una trampa a Matilde"	14 January 2019
Ulises is sure that Matilde is "Revoluchic", so he will follow her game to unmask her. Jessica is dismayed by the death of Fabiola, because she could have been the one who lose her life. Pablo prevents Tony and Ulises from being discovered by her mother, in a compromising situation. Romina breaks Silverio's heart, when she goes to LIKE just to say goodbye to her classmates. Ulises receives the terrible news that his father was arrested. When talking to him he finds out that he turned himself in so as not to hurt his son any more and apologizes for not being the father that Ulises deserves.
92	"Romi ingresa al convento"	15 January 2019
Romina does not change her decision, and begins to say goodbye to her friends in LIKE. Romina assures Silverio that, although she really loves him, she should dedicate her life to God, so she enters the convent. Martín disappears with Daniel, but Daniel loses consciousness. Manu is steeped in alcoholism since she broke up with Regina and sinks more now that she can not help Daniel.
93	"Ulises será deportado"	16 January 2019
Victoria informs Ulises that, in the absence of a guardian who takes care of him, he will have to be deported. Tony swears she will do everything to avoid it. Manuela discovers that Matilde is the real "Revoluchic" and unmasks her in front of Victoria and Humberto. Jessica reflects on the dangers of the obsession with beauty, through a video of Fabiola, her deceased friend.
94	"Ulises y Daniel se van de Like"	17 January 2019
Antonia realizes that running away with Ulises is not the best solution and decides to confess her plan in LIKE to find an alternative and for him to not be deported. The police arrive to deport Ulises to Peru. Daniel must go to the United States to treat his illness. León discovers strange messages on Keiko's cell phone.
95	"Abel es asesinado"	18 January 2019
Keiko opens her heart to León, telling him everything about her past. Abel is killed by the infiltrator in a shooting, and his dad swears revenge. LIKE celebrates its anniversary. Javier is arrested for fraud to his partner.
96	"León busca en Japón al asesino de Abel"	20 January 2019
97	"Like triunfa en el mundo"	20 January 2019
Leon goes through the streets of Japan to find Keiko's father, whom he blames for the death of his brother. Keiko will get married in Japan and wants her friends to sing at her wedding. Thanks to the support of her friends, Keiko manages to be free from the impositions of her father. Time later, the band achieves international success.

=== Specials ===
No.	Title	Original release date
1	"Like El Origen, Parte 1"	1 September 2018
Special on how the telenovela was created from the casting, costumes, set design.
2	"Like El Origen, Parte 2"	8 September 2018
Special on the filming of the series in Israel, creation of the music and the performance at the 2018 Premios Juventud.

== Awards and nominations ==
Year	Award	Category	Nominated	Result
2019	TVyNovelas Awards	Best Telenovela of the Year	Pedro Damián	Nominated
2019	TVyNovelas Awards	Best Antagonist Actor	Óscar Schwebel	Nominated
2019	TVyNovelas Awards	Best Leading Actress	Isela Vega	Nominated
2019	TVyNovelas Awards	Best Co-lead Actor	Rodrigo Murray	Nominated
2019	TVyNovelas Awards	Best Young Lead Actress	Ale Müller	Nominated
2019	TVyNovelas Awards	Best Young Lead Actress	Macarena García	Nominated
2019	TVyNovelas Awards	Best Young Lead Actress	Roberta Damián	Nominated
2019	TVyNovelas Awards	Best Young Lead Actor	Carlos Said	Nominated
2019	TVyNovelas Awards	Best Young Lead Actor	Mauricio Abad	Nominated
2019	TVyNovelas Awards	Best Young Lead Actor	Santiago Achaga	Won
2019	TVyNovelas Awards	Best Original Story or Adaptation	María Balmori	Nominated
2019	TVyNovelas Awards	Best Direction	Luis Pardo and Eloy Ganuza	Nominated
2019	TVyNovelas Awards	Best Direction of the Cameras	Vivian Sánchez Ross and Daniel Ferrer	Nominated
2019	TVyNovelas Awards	Best Musical Theme	"Este movimiento" (Like)	Nominated
2019	Eres Awards	Best Actress	Ale Müller	Won
2019	Eres Awards	Best Actress	Roberta Damián	Nominated
2019	Eres Awards	Best Actor	Santiago Achaga	Nominated
