= Ale Müller =

Mexican actress (born 1997)

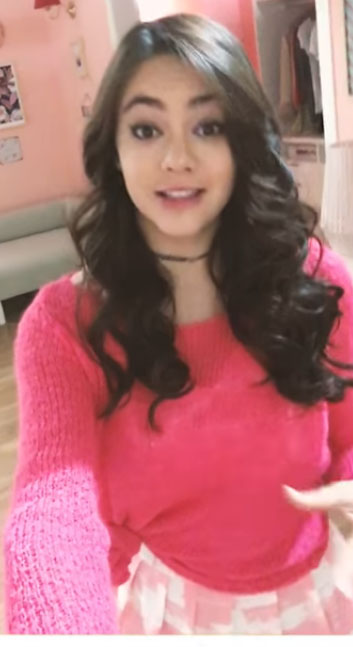
- Müller in 2017.
- Born: Alejandra Müller Arrieta; October 29, 1997 (age 28); Mexico City, Mexico
- Occupations: Actress; singer
- Years active: 2011–present
- Musical career
- Instruments: Vocals
- Label: Warner Music México (2013–present)

Alejandra Müller Arrieta (born 29 October 1997), known as Ale Müller, is a Mexican actress and singer. She was born in Mexico City, and first gained popularity for her debut role as Clara Licona in the Mexican sitcom La CQ.

She voiced Valentina/Luis in the film La leyenda de las momias de Guanajuato, and performed on stage in Santa Claus y la carta misteriosa. Her first protagonist role came in the telenovela

== Career ==
=== 2011 - 2017: Career beginnings and La CQ ===
Müller auditioned for the Mexican sitcom La CQ in 2010, a production between Cartoon Network's Latin American counterpart and multimedia giant Televisa. Müller obtained the role of Clara Licona, a new student at the secondary school and one of the six protagonists. To film the show, the cast moved to Caracas, Venezuela traveling back to Mexico between seasons. The main cast recorded an album, with Müller performing the song "Mejores Amigas" with co-star Josselyn Zuckerman, and "Perdóname" opposite Emiliano Flores.

== Filmography ==
Television roles
Year	Title	Role	Notes
2011-2017	La rosa de Guadalupe	Various roles	3 episodes
2012-2014	La CQ	Clara Licona	Main role; 99 episodes
2012-2016	Como dice el dicho	Various roles	4 episodes
2017	Divina, está en tu corazón	Catalina	60 episodes
2017	Guerra de ídolos	Azul Montoya	7 episodes
2018	Atrapada	Corina Herrera	Main cast
2018-2019	Like	Emilia Ruiz	Main role
2019	El corazón nunca se equivoca	Carlota Cervantes	Main cast
2019	Preso No. 1	Diana García Nieves	Main cast
2021	Diseñando tu amor	Nora	Main cast
2022	Mujer de nadie	Claudia Solís	Main cast
2025	La CQ: nuevo ingreso	Clara Licona	Guest star; 2 episodes
2026	El renacer de Luna	Salma Córdoba Esparza	

Film roles
Year	Title	Role	Notes
2014	La leyenda de las Momias	Valentina/Luis	Voice role

== Awards and nominations ==
Year	Association	Category	Work	Result
2013	Nickelodeon Mexico Kids' Choice Awards	Favorite TV actress	La CQ	Won
2014	Nickelodeon Mexico Kids' Choice Awards	Favorite TV actress	La CQ	Nominated
2019	Premios TVyNovelas	Best Young Actress	Like	Nominated
2019	Premios ERES	Best Actress	Like	Won
