= La CQ =

Mexican television teen sitcom

- Logo for the show
- Also known as: Constantino Quijano
- Genre: Comedy; Teen sitcom
- Created by: Pedro Ortiz de Pinedo
- Written by: Luis Antonio Bautista "Jurgan" Jacobo; Rocío Martínez Lara; Óscar Sebastián Ortíz de Pinedo Gutiérrez; Alicia Magalli Urquieta Galicia; Ignacio "Iñaki" Otero Sosa; Mauricio Antonio Jalife Castañón; Sergio Adrián Sánchez "El Venado" Dorantes; Víctor Acosta
- Directed by: Sergio Adrián Sánchez "El Venado" Dorantes
- Creative director: Leo Ricciardi
- Starring: Emiliano Flores; Alejandra Müller; Harold Azuara; Benny Emmanuel; Fernanda Urdapilleta; Natalia "Ferny" Graciano; Josselyn Zuckerman; Luis Fernando Ceballos
- Theme music composer: Giorgio Torelli
- Opening theme: "La CQ", performed by the main cast
- Composers: Francisco Álvarez; Rómulo Gallego
- Country of origin: Mexico
- Original language: Spanish
- No. of seasons: 4
- No. of episodes: 100 (list of episodes)

Production
- Executive producers: Pedro Ortiz de Pinedo; Carmen Cecilia Urbaneja (for RCTV, CA); Ángel Zambrano, Enrique Heredia, and Francisco Morales (for Turner Latin America)
- Production locations: Mexico City; Caracas
- Cinematography: Wily Balcazar
- Editors: Joel Querra; José Lara; Yosmer Escalona
- Running time: 22–23 minutes
- Production companies: Televisa; RCTV Studios; Turner International, Inc.

Original release
- Network: Cartoon Network
- Release: 6 August 2012 – 28 March 2014

Related
- La CQ: nuevo ingreso

La CQ (English: The CQ) is a Mexican television series created by Pedro Ortiz de Pinedo. Recorded at RCTV Studios in Caracas, Venezuela, it is a co-production between Televisa and Cartoon Network, making it also the first local original live-action series. It follows a group of friends as they experience conflicts throughout their middle school years.

The series first premiered on 6 August 2012, and returned with season 2 exactly four months later in December. The show's series finale aired on 1 March 2014.

In June 2024, it was announced that a sequel series with a new group of students was in production. The series, titled La CQ: nuevo ingreso, premiered on 9 December 2024.

== Plot ==
La CQ revolves around a group of eight friends who attend the middle school called Constantino Quijano. Each of the characters (Angel, Clara, Beto, Monche, Jenny, Danny, Adri, and Roque) often go through conflicts causing wild turns of events and misunderstandings, but more importantly always showing the value of friendship and being a team.

== Characters ==
- Ángel del Río (played by Emiliano Flores): Ángel is Adri's older brother, and is usually not the smartest of the fraternity. He is the captain of La CQ's soccer team and dreams of one day being a professional player. He is friendly and considered very handsome by the girls of the school. He is Clara's boyfriend and a best friend to both Monche and Beto since his childhood.
- Clara Licona (played by Ale Müller): Ángel's girlfriend (they start secretly dating at the end of Season 1), and Adri's best friend. She is the new student at La CQ. She is pretty but sometimes considered a little cheesy, especially when it comes to talking about Ángel. Her biggest enemy is Jenny, and she is considered the most "normal" out of the gang.
- Roberto "Beto" Bautista (played by Benny Emmanuel): Beto is the smartest not only of the group but the whole school, although he is not considered very handsome. He is best friends with Ángel and Monche and has a crush on Danny.
- Ramón “Monche” Barragán (played by Harold Azuara): Monche is the comedian of the group, although the most naive. He often tells nonsensical jokes or makes silly comments, and additionally sometimes spies on the cheerleaders or sneaks into the girls' restroom. He also has a habit of smoothening his hair.
- Maria Juana "Jenny" Pinto del Rostro (played by Fernanda Urdapilleta): Jenny is the captain of the school's cheerleaders and is very mean. She is the daughter of La CQ's principal, and has a cousin named Danny (who she's always bossing around). She has a crush on Ángel, but he doesn't like her back, making her share a rivalry with Clara and Adri. She is considered the most girly and likes to be the center of attention. Even though she is a mean girl, the rest consider her a friend of the crew. Her biggest secret is her love for tacos which only Danny knows.
- Daniela "Danny" Pinto del Rostro (played by Ferny Graciano) Danny is the other nitwit of the gang. She is pretty naive, distracted, and doesn't catch on very fast. She has a crush on Beto and carries a doll named "Clementina". She is Jenny's cousin and is always following her orders. She is the niece of La CQ's principal and a very good friend of the crew.
- Adriana "Adri" del Río (played by Josselyn Zuckerman): Adri is Ángel's younger sister, Clara's best friend and, most of the time, the group's voice of reason. She hates being feminine and is more of a tomboy, something Jenny always makes fun of. She doesn't like when Roque picks on her friends and always stands up to him, but secretly she has feelings for him and is only trying to change his ways.
- "Roque" Villalón Pérez (played by Luis Fernando Ceballos) Roque is the school's bully always picking on smaller children, but mostly Monche and Beto. Jenny, being the principal's daughter, always uses him to get what she wants. Roque has failed at least three times, which leads to him being in the same grade level as the rest. He's friends with the Del Rio siblings (more of a frenemy in Ángel's case) even when the rest of the group dislikes him for his attitude. He always shows his true self whenever he's alone with Adri, proving he's a very sensible and kind person.

== Production ==
La CQ was first conceived in 2006, with Pedro Ortiz de Pinedo commencing writing on the show the following year. The show was announced to be in production in early 2012 after a co-production agreement was signed between Cartoon Network and Televisa. The show is considered to be the first live action series for Cartoon Network Latin America.

The show was cancelled by Televisa in 2014. After production ended, a movie and a Brazilian version of the show were announced by Pedro Ortiz de Pinedo, with negotiations in January 2014 to discuss the future for the series' branding. The show spawned a musical, an album of songs, and tours across theaters in Mexico.

== Reception ==
La CQ received mixed reception and criticism since its premiere. Although the show was a critical success among Mexican audiences, who valued the family-oriented nature of the show, other viewers criticized the plot of the episodes, the poor performances, the visual effects, the humor (considered simple and boring), and the excessive use of a laugh track.

The show was also criticized by Mexican viewers due to Cartoon Network's partnership with Televisa, and the frowned upon nature of the organization.

=== Accolades ===
Year	Award	Category	Nominee(s)	Result
2013	Kids' Choice Awards Mexico	Favorite TV Series	La CQ	Won
2013	Kids' Choice Awards Mexico	Favorite Actor in a Supporting Role	Harold Azuara	Won
2013	Kids' Choice Awards Mexico	Favorite Actress	Ale Müller	Won
2013	Kids' Choice Awards Mexico	Favorite Actress in a Supporting Role	Anna Fernanda Urdapilleta	Won
2014	Premios TVyNovelas	Best Unit Program	La CQ	Nominated

== Episodes ==
Season	Episodes	Originally released	
Season	Episodes	First released	Last released
1	25	August 6, 2012	September 17, 2012
2	24	December 6, 2012	April 7, 2013
3	25	May 6, 2013	October 31, 2013
4	26	December 6, 2013	March 1, 2014

== Sequel series ==
On 5 June 2024, series creator Pedro Ortiz de Pinedo revealed that a sequel series was in the works, with a new generation entering the school. It premiered on 9 December 2024.
