= Geraldine Galván =

Mexican actress and singer

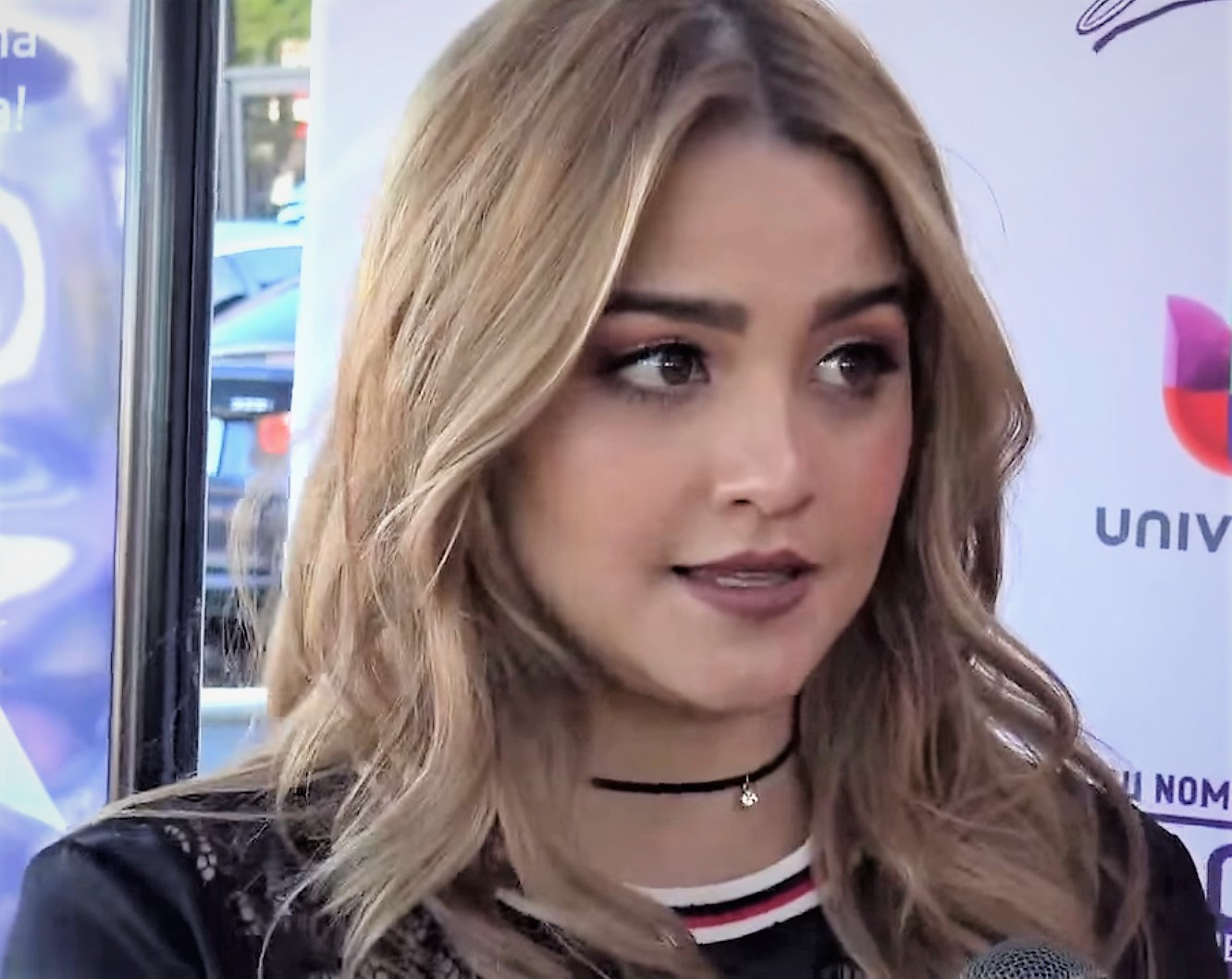
- Galván interviewed by Dulce Osuna in 2017
- Born: Geraldine Alejandra Galván Correa; August 30, 1993 (age 32); Mexico City, Mexico
- Occupations: Actress, singer

Geraldine Alejandra Galván Correa (born August 30, 1993, Mexico City, Mexico) is a Mexican actress and singer.

== Career ==
Geraldine Galván began her acting career at the age of four. Subsequently, she studied at the Centro de Educación Artística of Televisa. She appeared in television shows such as El cubo de Donalú, La hora pico, El reto Burundis, Plaza Sésamo, Mujer, casos de la vida real and La familia P. Luche among others. She has participated in several soap operas including Amy, la niña de la mochila azul, Carita de ángel, María Belén, Pablo y Andrea and Cómplices al rescate. She also starred as Fabiolita in El noveno mandamiento, and has appeared in some episodes of drama anthologies La rosa de Guadalupe and Como dice el dicho. She was also part of the Mexican film Abel.

In 2014, Galván played a supporting role in the Telemundo telenovela Reina de corazones as Greta de Rosas. In 2023, she was cast in another Telemundo telenovela Vuelve a mí as Consuelo García.

== Filmography ==
=== Film ===
Film
| Year | Project | Role | Notes |
|---|---|---|---|
| 2010 | Abel | Selene | Debut film |

=== Television series ===
Television series
| Year | Project | Role | Notes |
|---|---|---|---|
| 2001 | Carita de ángel | | Supporting role |
| 2001 | El noveno mandamiento | Fabiolita | Supporting role |
| 2001 | María Belén | Geraldine | Supporting role |
| 2002 | Cómplices al rescate | Doris Torres | Supporting role |
| 2003–04 | Mujer, casos de la vida real | | Episode: "Avivando el odio" Episode: "Con una pizca de optimismo" |
| 2004 | Amy, la niña de la mochila azul | Mary Loly Álvarez-Vega | Supporting role |
| 2005 | Pablo y Andrea | Hilda | |
| 2008 | Terminales | Brenda Márquez | 13 episodes |
| 2008–11 | La rosa de Guadalupe | Verónica; Mariana | Main cast Episodes: "Saber amar" and "Dulce venganza" |
| 2010 | Mujeres asesinas | Lupita | Main cast Season 3, Episode 4: "Elvira y Mercedes, Justicieras" |
| 2011 | Cuando me enamoro | Alisson Contreras | Supporting role |
| 2011 | Rafaela | Lupe / Lucía | Supporting role |
| 2011–13 | Como dice el dicho | Paulina; Sasha; Brenda | Supporting role Season 1, Episode 18: "Lo que de prisa se hace" Season 1, Episode 57: "Nunca es tarde para hacer el bien" Season 1, Episode 64: "Amigo en la adversidad, amigo de verdad" Season 3, Episode 5: "El amor y el dolor" |
| 2012 | Por ella soy Eva | Jennifer Contreras | Supporting role |
| 2013 | Mentir para vivir | Fabiola Camargo Aresti | Main role |
| 2014 | Reina de corazones | Greta de Rosas | Supporting role |
| 2017 | Su Nombre Era Dolores | Chiquis Rivera | Supporting role |
| 2018 | Hijas de la luna | Juana Inés Bautista | Main role |
| 2019–20 | Dani Who? | Victoria Mata | Main role |
| 2020 | Vencer el miedo | Jaqueline Montes | Supporting role |
| 2022 | Esta historia me suena | Violeta | Episode: "Una hora más" |
| 2023 | Vuelve a mí | Consuelo "Chelo" García | Main role |
| 2025 | La CQ: nuevo ingreso | Caro | Episode: "Los cincuenta años de la CQ" |
| 2026 | Cuando fui bonita | Paola Hernández | Lead role |
