= Mi rival (2026 TV series) =

- Genre: Telenovela
- Based on: Cuando la rival es una hija by Inés Rodena
- Written by: Perla Farias; Verónica Suárez; Basilio Álvarez; Felipe Silva
- Directed by: Héctor Márquez Campos; Enrique Arroyo
- Starring: Sebastián Rulli; Ela Velden; Alejandra Barros; Arturo Peniche
- Theme music composer: Carlos Rivera
- Opening theme: "Sin despedida" by Carlos Rivera & Alejandro Fernández
- Composers: Manuel A. Vázquez Terry; Gabriel Chávez Herrera
- Country of origin: Mexico
- Original language: Spanish
- No. of seasons: 1
- No. of episodes: 52

Production
- Executive producer: Carmen Armendáriz
- Producers: Abraham Quintero Botello; Andrea Sánchez Moyano
- Cinematography: Víctor Dávila; Rodrigo Rodríguez
- Editors: Perla Martínez; Mauricio Espejel; Mario Vadir Barragán; Roberto Bolado
- Camera setup: Multi-camera
- Production company: TelevisaUnivision

Original release
- Network: Las Estrellas
- Release: 2 March – 14 May 2026

Mi rival (English: My Rival) is a Mexican telenovela produced by Carmen Armendáriz for TelevisaUnivision. It is based on Inés Rodena's radionovela Cuando la rival es una hija. The series stars Sebastián Rulli, Alejandra Barros and Ela Velden. It aired on Univision from 2 March 2026 to 14 May 2026. In Mexico, the series aired on Las Estrellas from 20 April 2026 to 28 June 2026.

== Plot ==
Paloma García is married to Porfirio Cruz, 25 years her senior, an important sugar plantation owner in San Luis Potosí. As a teenager, Renato Tirado is adopted by Gustavo Rodríguez, another important sugar plantation owner in San Luis, after rescuing his son from a group of thugs. Renato and Paloma meet at the San Luis fairgrounds and feel an undeniable mutual attraction. Overwhelmed by her feelings, Paloma hastens her return home to Porfirio, who is very ill. Bárbara, her 25-year-old daughter, is also forced to return to the plantation to be near her father. Porfirio, overwhelmed by the demands of the estate, asks his partner and friend Gustavo for help in finding an administrator. Gustavo, who secretly covets Porfirio's estate, recommends Renato, his protégé, who is unaware of Gustavo's ambitions.

Paloma, who is weighed down by her loveless marriage, is shocked when she sees Renato arrive at the estate. She is even more surprised when she discovers that Bárbara is also attracted to him. Things get worse when, thanks to his intelligence and talent, Renato works hard to try to get Hacienda Cruz back on its feet. For Bárbara, her initial attraction to Renato gradually turns into a deep love that will be difficult to hide. From this point on, the unconditional love between mother and daughter becomes blurred, when each one's own happiness is endangered by the other. They never thought they would end up as rivals.

== Cast ==
- Sebastián Rulli as Renato Tirado
- Ela Velden as Bárbara Cruz García
- Alejandra Barros as Paloma García
- Arturo Peniche as Gustavo Rodríguez
- Ana Bertha Espín as Rosario García "Chelo"
- Martha Julia as Georgina Rodríguez
- Marco Treviño as Porfirio Cruz
- Cinthia Aparicio as Dalilah Fuentes
- Mildred Feuchter as María García
- Edward Castillo as Luis Ernesto Rodríguez
- Diana Haro as Rosa Martínez
- José Daniel Figueroa as Vicente Lopez "Lopecito"
- Axel Ricco as Father Emiliano
- Juan Carlos Remolina as Samuel Vargas
- Ignacio Guadalupe as Ramiro
- Vicente Tamayo as Rodrigo Montemayor
- Jorge Caballero as Brayan León
- Patricio Labastida as Roberto "Beto" Terrazas
- Iker Madrid as Hilario Sánchez "El Trenza"
- Daniel Martínez as Gabino Ortega
- Mercedes Hernández as Manuela Garrido
- Cassandra Iturralde as Lupita Ortega
- Nicolás Pous as Santiago Valdez
- Alex Figueroa as David

== Production ==
On 17 July 2025, Sebastián Rulli, Alejandra Barros and Ela Velden were announced in the lead roles of Mi rival. The first table read was held on 18 August 2025. Filming of the telenovela took place from 29 September 2025 to 4 February 2026.

== Ratings ==
=== Mexico ratings ===
Viewership and ratings per season of Mi rival
Season	Timeslot (CT)	Episodes	First aired		Last aired		Avg. viewers (millions)
Season	Timeslot (CT)	Episodes	Date	Viewers (millions)	Date	Viewers (millions)	Avg. viewers (millions)
1	Mon–Fri 9:30 p.m.	52	20 April 2026	4.53	28 June 2026	3.08	3.78

== Episodes ==
No.	Title	U.S. air date	Mexico air date	Mexico viewers (millions)
1	"Un maldito alacrán por siempre"	2 March 2026	20 April 2026	4.53
2	"Provocaciones"	3 March 2026	21 April 2026	4.24
3	"Amor forzado"	4 March 2026	22 April 2026	4.02
4	"Topar con pared"	5 March 2026	23 April 2026	4.11
5	"Corazonada"	6 March 2026	24 April 2026	3.71
6	"Ella no va a lograr separarnos"	9 March 2026	27 April 2026	3.58
7	"Renace la esperanza"	10 March 2026	28 April 2026	4.16
8	"Tu pasado está escrito"	11 March 2026	29 April 2026	3.74
9	"La verdad a la luz"	12 March 2026	30 April 2026	3.53
10	"Con él soy una mujer"	13 March 2026	1 May 2026	4.12
11	"Odio de madre"	16 March 2026	4 May 2026	3.91
12	"Solo se necesita amor"	17 March 2026	5 May 2026	3.89
13	"Un alma rota"	18 March 2026	6 May 2026	3.67
14	"Vendiéndole el alma al diablo"	19 March 2026	7 May 2026	4.15
15	"Revolución y guerra"	20 March 2026	8 May 2026	3.93
16	"La felicidad y la tristeza"	23 March 2026	11 May 2026	3.94
17	"Dividir y vencer"	24 March 2026	12 May 2026	3.97
18	"Tregua y dudas"	25 March 2026	13 May 2026	3.35
19	"Contra el diablo"	26 March 2026	14 May 2026	3.80
20	"Enemigo del pasado"	27 March 2026	15 May 2026	3.90
21	"Buen trabajador, mal hombre"	30 March 2026	18 May 2026	3.95
22	"Mujer contra mujer"	1 April 2026	19 May 2026	3.81
23	"La pareja ideal"	2 April 2026	20 May 2026	3.70
24	"Distancia"	3 April 2026	21 May 2026	3.60
25	"Alianzas"	6 April 2026	22 May 2026	3.66
26	"Poliamor"	7 April 2026	25 May 2026	3.70
27	"Deuda pendiente"	8 April 2026	26 May 2026	3.96
28	"Soltando al diablo"	9 April 2026	27 May 2026	3.91
29	"Mala noticia"	10 April 2026	28 May 2026	3.92
30	"Nada que arreglar"	13 April 2026	29 May 2026	3.70
31	"El ángel y el diablo"	14 April 2026	1 June 2026	3.96
32	"Cacería"	15 April 2026	2 June 2026	4.06
33	"Al rojo vivo"	16 April 2026	3 June 2026	3.82
34	"Beneficio riesgoso"	17 April 2026	4 June 2026	3.78
35	"Solo una amistad"	20 April 2026	5 June 2026	3.71
36	"Plan con maña"	21 April 2026	8 June 2026	3.92
37	"Tres mujeres y un hombre"	23 April 2026	9 June 2026	3.83
38	"Cabeza fría"	24 April 2026	10 June 2026	3.80
39	"Hambre de guerra"	27 April 2026	11 June 2026	3.84
40	"Boda de pesadilla"	28 April 2026	12 June 2026	3.58
41	"Lágrimas de sangre"	29 April 2026	15 June 2026	3.74
42	"Veneno de nuevo"	30 April 2026	16 June 2026	4.04
43	"La verdad en el filo"	1 May 2026	17 June 2026	4.05
44	"Camino cerrado"	4 May 2026	18 June 2026	2.57
45	"Primera advertencia"	5 May 2026	19 June 2026	3.77
46	"Moviendo las fichas"	6 May 2026	22 June 2026	3.77
47	"Padres divididos"	7 May 2026	23 June 2026	3.43
48	"Descongelando el corazón"	8 May 2026	24 June 2026	2.36
49	"Malas señales"	11 May 2026	25 June 2026	3.88
50	"Inculpado"	12 May 2026	26 June 2026	3.68
51	"Llegando al futuro"	13 May 2026	28 June 2026	3.08
52	"La guerra antes de la paz"	14 May 2026	28 June 2026	3.08

== Release ==
Mi rival premiered first in the United States on Univision on 2 March 2026. In Mexico, the series premiered on Las Estrellas on 20 April 2026.
