= El precio de amarte =

- Genre: Telenovela
- Based on: Terra Brava by Inês Gomes
- Developed by: Gabriela Ortigoza
- Written by: Fermín Zúñiga; Ricardo Tejeda; Verónica Suárez; María de la Paz Aguirre; Juan Carlos Tejeda
- Directed by: Héctor Márquez Campos; Enrique Arroyo
- Starring: Marcus Ornellas; Scarlet Gruber; Alejandra Barros; Jorge Poza
- Theme music composer: Christian Nodal; Edgar Barrera
- Opening theme: "La corazonada" by Christian Nodal
- Composers: Manuel A. Vázquez Terry; Gabriel Chávez Herrera
- Country of origin: Mexico
- Original language: Spanish
- No. of seasons: 1
- No. of episodes: 50

Production
- Executive producer: Carmen Armendáriz
- Producers: Abraham Quintero Botello; Andrea Sánchez Moyano
- Editors: Perla Martínez; Mauricio Espejel; Mario Vadir Barragán
- Camera setup: Multi-camera
- Production company: TelevisaUnivision

Original release
- Network: Las Estrellas
- Release: 2 September – 8 November 2024

El precio de amarte (English title: The Burden of Loving You) is a Mexican telenovela produced by Carmen Armendáriz for TelevisaUnivision. It is based on the 2019 Portuguese telenovela Terra Brava, created by Inês Gomes. The series stars Marcus Ornellas and Scarlet Gruber. It aired on Las Estrellas from 2 September 2024 to 8 November 2024.

== Plot ==
Diogo / Rodrigo, an investigative judicial agent, returns to his hometown to seek justice and confront Eduarda, the person responsible for the death of his parents, but his life takes an unexpected turn when he reunites with Amelia, Eduarda's daughter.

Eduarda is the housekeeper of the La Fortuna estate and mistress of Clemente Covarrubias, Diogo's father. Eduarda becomes pregnant with the hope of persuading Clemente to leave his wife Teresa, but he instead provides her with a substantial amount of money and insists that she leave the farm immediately. Eduarda enlists the help of Jorge and his brother to kidnap Diogo to make Clemente pay for his rejection. Clemente, in a desperate attempt to rescue him, is killed by Jorge in Diogo's presence. Jorge's brother is unable to kill Diogo and leaves him abandoned to his fate in Guatemala. Teresa dies after falling into depression and her youngest son, Bernardo, is sent to an orphanage.

Diogo faces numerous challenges to get by on the street, and when he is apprehended for robbery he meets Héctor Zárate, the federal agent appointed by the authorities to find him. Héctor informs Diogo that his mother died and his brother was adopted, so he offers to take care of him and give him his last name. From that moment on, Diogo becomes Rodrigo Zárate and promises himself to find the person responsible for his kidnapping and the death of his parents.

Years later, Rodrigo catches Jorge in a raid and immediately recognizes him by the tattoo on his arm. Jorge reveals to him that the person who ordered his kidnapping was Eduarda, the current owner of La Fortuna. Rodrigo leaves his job to return to the farm in search of justice. Amelia, now a veterinarian on the farm, is married to Iván, a doctor who owns the town hospital, with whom she has a son: Martín. The marriage is a nightmare because of Iván's jealousy. On Rodrigo's return to town, a car accident involving Amelia and her son occurs, prompting Rodrigo to rush to their aid. At the hospital, he discovers that the woman he saved is his childhood friend, Amelia, who feels an instant connection with him.

Eduarda thanks Rodrigo for his heroic action and he asks her for a job with the idea of investigating her and having the necessary evidence to send her to prison. This is how he discovers Eduarda's dirty business and who she has removed from her way to acquire more power and wealth. Rodrigo never expected to fall in love with Amelia, who is focused on raising her son, despite her mutual attraction to him. As their complicated love triangle unfolds. Iván, seeing that he is losing Amelia, becomes determined to sabotage Rodrigo. Rodrigo is torn between love and seeking justice, while Amelia struggles between her loyalty to her family and her feelings for Rodrigo.

== Cast ==
=== Main ===
- Marcus Ornellas as Rodrigo Zárate / Diogo Covarrubias
  - Juanpa Molina as child Diogo
- Scarlet Gruber as Amelia Ferreira Saldívar
  - Ainara Camila as child Amelia
- Alejandra Barros as Eduarda Saldívar de Ferreira
- Jorge Poza as Iván Franco
- Enoc Leaño as Héctor Zárate
- Raquel Garza as Perpetua Barrientos
- Úrsula Pruneda as Arminda Barrientos de Cruz
- Alejandra Ambrosi as Katia Figueroa
- Antón Araiza as Francisco Ferreira
- Juan Carlos Barreto as Tomás Franco
- Verónica Jaspeado as Roseta Saldívar
- Rubén Zamora as Enrique Toledo
- Ignacio Guadalupe as Norberto Cruz

=== Recurring and guest stars ===
- Gabriel Porras as Jorge Nieto
- Edu Maruri as Ramiro / Felipe Cuesta
- Vicente Tamayo as Alfonso Ferreira Saldívar
- Fernando Rebeil as Oscar Garza Barrientos
- José Daniel Figueroa as Andrés Rivas
- Marcia Coutiño as Juliana Nava de Toledo
- Ana Celeste as Tina Otero
- Epy Vélez as Xanat Rivas Figueroa
- Arantza Ruiz as Diana Nieto
- Eugenio Montessoro as Raúl Alegre
- Nicolasa Ortíz Monasterio as Nubia Alegre
- César Acosta as David Toledo Nava
- Sebastián Poza as Tavo Cruz Barrientos
- Nina Rubín as Lía Garza
- Kenneth Lavill as Martín Franco Ferreira
- Patricio Labastida as Germán Lazo
- Ilse Ikeda as Candy Meza
- Valeria Burgos as Olga Tavares
- Paula Cacho as Gina Martínez
- Iker Madrid as Samuel Mejía
- Juan Carlos Remolina as Tarek Soto

== Production ==
In May 2024, the series was announced at TelevisaUnivision's upfront for the 2024–2025 television season. A month later, Marcus Ornellas and Scarlet Gruber were announced in the lead roles. Filming began on 26 July 2024. The telenovela has 50 episodes confirmed for broadcast.

== Ratings ==
Viewership and ratings per season of El precio de amarte
Season	Timeslot (CT)	Episodes	First aired		Last aired		Avg. viewers (millions)
Season	Timeslot (CT)	Episodes	Date	Viewers (millions)	Date	Viewers (millions)	Avg. viewers (millions)
1	Mon–Fri 9:30 p.m.	46	2 September 2024	2.48	8 November 2024	2.26	2.22

== Episodes ==
No.	Title	Original release date	Mexico viewers (millions)
1	"Me lo quitaron todo"	2 September 2024 (Note: Premiered early online through Las Estrellas website on 30 August 2024.)	2.48
Diogo and Amelia make an oath to see each other again, but he is abducted and abruptly taken away from La Fortuna. After Teresa's death, Eduarda takes charge of the ranch and waits for the day Diogo and Bernardo return home. Diogo manages to return to Mexico and agrees to stay under Héctor's care under the clear promise of finding the people guilty of having changed his life. Years later, Martín causes Amelia to suffer a serious car accident, but Rodrigo arrives in time to save her life.
2	"Ya perdí a Amelia"	3 September 2024	2.34
Iván assures that Amelia was entirely to blame for the accident, but she accuses him that it was all because of his harassment. Iván warns that Martín could lose the use of his legs, but it is impossible for him to know for sure before his son regains consciousness. Rodrigo is shocked to discover that the woman he rescued from the accident is Amelia, his childhood friend. Eduarda surprises Rodrigo by showing up at his door, but she only wants to thank him for saving her family.
3	"Quisiera pasar la noche contigo"	4 September 2024	2.31
Iván finds Rodrigo very close to Amelia and is jealousy when he learns that they will work together on Eduarda's orders. Rodrigo questions Amelia about her past and takes advantage of the proximity to let her know the feelings she provokes in him; Iván listens to them. Iván puts Eduarda on alert when he warns her that before his arrival in town, Rodrigo was a policeman. Rodrigo takes advantage of Martín's admiration to convince him to accept rehabilitation therapy so that he can walk again.
4	"¿Aún amas a tu esposo?"	5 September 2024	N/A
Rodrigo regains Amelia's trust and she asks him to work for her again without caring what Eduarda may think about it. Jorge blames Eduarda for the attack he suffered in prison, but Héctor visits him to confess that he ordered his welcome. Rodrigo confirms that Eduarda never won the lottery, giving rise to the suspicion that she used his ransom money to buy La Fortuna. Rodrigo insists that Amelia confess the reality of her marriage and lets himself get carried away while they talk about love.
5	"Los celos me están ahogando"	6 September 2024	2.14
Eduarda visits Héctor to personally investigate the reason why he and Rodrigo decided to move to Tierra de Agua. Rodrigo makes sure everyone knows that Eduarda lied when she said she bought La Fortuna after winning the lottery. Xanat realizes that Alfonso prepared a picnic for their date and fears that he is only interested in sleeping with her. Iván confirms that there is something else going on between Rodrigo and Amelia and decides to confess to Martín his true diagnosis as revenge.
6	"Todo en Eduarda es falso"	9 September 2024	2.17
Rodrigo begins to follow Eduarda on the sly and finds her visiting the same prison where Jorge Nieto is being held. Iván assures Amelia that the only way to save their marriage is to keep an eye on her to find out who is trying to take her away from him. Rodrigo manages to get into Eduarda's office and discovers that there is no evidence that she has legally bought La Fortuna. Rodrigo insists that Amelia divorce Iván without knowing that they are being watched.
7	"Mi matrimonio fue un error"	10 September 2024	1.94
Tina invites Felipe to see her show at the Tropicaloso, but she can't contain her attraction and takes him to bed. Rodrigo learns that Iván is investigating his past and confronts him to put a stop to it. Rodrigo confesses to Amelia the love he feels for her and kisses her. Francisco confronts Eduarda after receiving evidence that she never bought La Fortuna, raising more suspicions that she has never been honest with him.
8	"Soy Diogo Covarrubias"	11 September 2024	2.14
Eduarda demands Alfonso to put limits to his relationship with Xanat, but he refuses, assuring that what he feels for her is true love. Rodrigo discovers the place where his parents' remains are and is surprised to find Eduarda in front of them. Alfonso tricks Amelia to get her and Rodrigo together, but Iván discovers them and confronts her about her infidelity. Eduarda confronts the stranger who showed up at the gates of La Fortuna and is surprised to learn that he is Diogo Covarrubias.
9	"No te quiero dejar ir"	12 September 2024	2.21
Rodrigo is investigated by the police thanks to Iván, who claims that Rodrigo decided to attack him as soon as he saw him crossing the street. Amelia confronts Iván knowing that he may have been able to fake the attack for which he accuses Rodrigo. Diogo attends Amelia's invitation and is questioned about his reasons for not having claimed his place in La Fortuna. Francisco gets Roseta out of jail and shows her that the love he feels for her is more alive than ever.
10	"No te vayas a enamorar de Amelia"	13 September 2024	1.90
Hector fears that with the arrival of false Diogo, Rodrigo is putting his relationship with Amelia at risk. Iván confronts Diogo to keep him away from Amelia and demands that he leave Tierra de Agua as soon as possible. Amelia tests her friendship with Diogo by taking him to their childhood tree. Rodrigo finds it necessary to remind César that he is not Diogo and to prevent him from falling in love with Amelia.
11	"Una compensación económica"	16 September 2024	2.06
Amelia reveals that thanks to Rodrigo, she has discovered what love is, but finds herself bound by Ivan's threats. Amelia is alarmed to discover that Martín disappeared from La Fortuna, but Iván sneaked him away to provoke a family outing. Iván finds a new witness to testify against Rodrigo to order his arrest for trying to murder him. During dinner, Diogo lets everyone see that there are important details of his life in La Fortuna that he seems to have completely forgotten.
12	"Diogo es un estafador"	17 September 2024	2.09
Rodrigo learns that Iván attacked Amelia and runs to threaten him so that he won't try it again. Eduarda interrogates Diogo to find out from whom he got such detailed information about the real Diogo Covarrubias. Rodrigo reveals to Amelia that Diogo was nothing more than an impostor and she regrets having fallen for the deception. Before leaving, Iván warns Martín that Rodrigo is the only one to blame for his separation from Amelia.
13	"Estoy entre el amor y la justicia"	18 September 2024	2.24
Iván shows Amelia his interest in improving their relationship by giving her Alfonso's clothes with which he planned to denounce him for the death of his friend. Rodrigo advises Amelia not to see her divorce as a failure, but as a new opportunity to be happy by his side. Iván assures Martín that he and Amelia are not getting divorced, but will take advantage of the separation to solve their marital problems. Amelia decides to go horseback riding in search of some peace but ends up suffering an accident.
14	"Tengo que enfrentar mis fantasmas"	19 September 2024	2.25
Francisco learns that Amelia's accident was provoked and suspects that it was a warning from the crooks to whom Eduarda owes money. Rodrigo warns Amelia that her accident was no accident and asks her and Martín to stay away from the stable while he catches the culprit. Xanat discovers that Katia is still seeing Óscar and reveals to Andrés who her mother's lover is. Rodrigo defends Eduarda and Francisco from Samuel, but ends up paying the price for his meddling.
15	"Me traicionaste, mamá"	20 September 2024	2.03
Amelia realizes that there are many things that Eduarda is hiding from her and worried about her life, she demands the truth about the people who are threatening her. Héctor must be operated on immediately, but Rodrigo refuses for fear that Iván will take revenge on him for pursuing Amelia. Francisco proposes to Amelia and Alfonso to remove Eduarda from the presidency to stop the extortionists' attacks. Eduarda confirms Francisco's infidelity and confronts Roseta to get her to stay away from her husband.
16	"Creí que era amor, pero no"	23 September 2024	2.25
Eduarda confronts Francisco about his infidelity and he takes advantage of the discussion to ask for a divorce. Disappointed with his parents, Alfonso confesses to Xanat that her love is the realest thing he has in life and they let themselves be carried away by passion. Xanat brags about her happiness to Nubia, but she becomes envious and warns Eduarda that her daughter-in-law is a gold digger. Amelia decides to ignore Eduarda's order and visits her lawyer to file for divorce.
17	"Los hombres valientes sí lloramos"	24 September 2024	2.18
Perpetua catches Héctor's attention when he realizes that she has a secret business with Eduarda. Amelia agrees to go to dinner with Iván, but only to let him know that she has already started divorce proceedings, hoping that he will take the news like the adult he is. Iván is jealous when he sees that Rodrigo accompanied Martín to give the same school talk that he had despised. Eduarda sends a strong message to the family using Martín as the weakest link in La Fortuna.
18	"Nos marcaste el destino a todos"	25 September 2024	2.13
Óscar convinces Katia to move into his house under the condition that she be treated as a guest so as not to raise suspicions about their relationship. Jorge appears in front of Eduarda to warn her that he has returned to collect the money she owes him, or he will be forced to confess all the secrets he knows about her. Rodrigo tries to make Jorge pay for attacking Héctor, but Jorge manages to get him off his back by threatening to reveal to the whole town that he is Diogo Covarrubias. Silvia, Eduarda's assistant, confesses to Rodrigo that her boss forced her to omit some documents from the audit that Francisco requested.
19	"Mi hijo no es un criminal"	26 September 2024	2.04
Héctor complains to Jorge for forcing him to help him leave the country after committing the crimes that changed Rodrigo's life forever. Alfonso is afraid of dying in the operating room, so before being admitted he decides to confess that he is to blame for the death of his friend Ray. Tina discovers Felipe with a body in the trunk and he is forced to confess the truth of his past. Rodrigo assures Iván that he is also guilty of Alfonso's crime for having convinced him to run away.
20	"Queda usted detenido"	27 September 2024	2.22
Arminda loses her fear of Eduarda and confronts her, assuring that Alfonso will pay with jail for Ray's death. Tavo visits Alfonso to try to take the blame for Ray's death into his own hands. Iván warns the authorities that he will release Alfonso from the hospital so that they can make sure he pays for his crime. Rodrigo discovers that Héctor is the person who helped Jorge cross the border from Guatemala when he was separated from his family.
21	"Puedo ser tu segundo marido"	30 September 2024	2.39
Rodrigo finds his mother's grave, but instead of giving him relief, it unleashes more doubts about his past. Thanks to Silverio's help, Eduarda is able to get in touch with Francisco's auditor so she can manipulate the report as she pleases. Héctor confesses to Rodrigo that he discovered that Clemente and Eduarda were lovers and suspects that Amelia could be his half-sister.
22	"No pudiste ser el héroe"	1 October 2024	2.17
Rodrigo refuses to believe Héctor's theory and decides to carry out his own DNA test to clarify once and for all if Amelia is his sister. Eduarda organizes an attack against Iván to make him understand what will happen if the extortionists are not paid. Rodrigo offers to support Iván in paying the extortionists, but Iván does everything he can to keep all the credit. Jorge meets Amelia at the patron saint's party, and is surprised to find out that she is Eduarda's daughter.
23	"Quiero recuperarme"	2 October 2024	2.45
Andrés advises Xanat to give in to Alfonso in all discussions, as he assures her that their marriage is a sure ticket out of poverty. Jorge visits La Fortuna to meet with Amelia and ask for riding lessons. Perpetua listens to Felipe's advice and asks Héctor to give in to the passion they have felt since they met. Rodrigo receives the results of his tests and confirms his fear of being in love with his half-sister.
24	"Necesito matar este amor"	3 October 2024	2.34
Eduarda organizes a trap to get rid of Jorge's threats and love once and for all. Rodrigo is forced to reveal to Arminda that he is the real Diogo Covarrubias to prevent Eduarda from finding out. Martín's surgery is successful and the doctor confirms that with some therapy, he could walk again. Rodrigo must find a way to end the love between him and Amelia.
25	"Vivito y coleando"	4 October 2024	2.31
Rodrigo convinces Jorge that he is the best alternative to get out of town alive, but he will help him under certain conditions. Rodrigo confesses that his best strategy to take revenge on Eduarda is Jorge's testimony. A talent scout approaches Nubia to propose a musical career, but under the condition of working with Tina. Jorge tricks Héctor in order to secretly visit Amelia and confess his suspicions that he is her father.
26	"No eres una santa"	7 October 2024	2.25
Alfonso confronts Iván for lying to him when he blamed him for Ray's death and suspects that he killed him to keep him away from Amelia. Rodrigo suspects that Iván would try to obstruct the forensic investigation and makes sure that the police obtain the analysis that Ray took before his death. Amelia thanks Rodrigo for helping the police and asks him for one more chance so they can be happy together. Roseta confesses to Francisco her desire to be a mother and seeing that she will not be able to adopt, she asks for his help to conceive.
27	"Todos tienen secretos"	8 October 2024	2.34
Eduarda sends Rodrigo to follow Jorge, but when he doesn't find him, he decides to fake his death to gain his boss's trust. Roseta is surprised to receive the news that she is already pregnant. Olga visits Rodrigo to ask for help, because since she and Gina were orphaned, their stepfather has made their lives impossible. Amelia discovers that Jorge Nieto is her biological father and despises Eduarda for having lied to her.
28	"No me lastimes nunca más"	9 October 2024	2.17
Rodrigo decides to investigate the reason why, according to the analysis, Amelia is his half-sister. Rodrigo recognizes his mistake and asks Amelia for a new opportunity to love each other and they give in to desire. Iván tries to turn Martín against Amelia, warning him that before saving her, he thought he saw her kissing Rodrigo. Amelia decides to investigate if the rumor that Rodrigo has a girlfriend with whom he is living is true.
29	"Este amor me rebasa"	10 October 2024	N/A
Martín knows love at first sight when he learns that Gina is going to share the same classroom as him. Perpetua decides to try her luck and dares to confess her love to Raúl with a kiss. Nubia tries to negotiate her contract with Fonseca and he asks her for a sample of what she would be willing to do in exchange for being famous. Francisco tells the family that he will soon have a child with Roseta, but Eduarda makes it clear that under no circumstances will she accept the divorce.
30	"¡No quiero verte!"	11 October 2024	2.34
Enrique warns Rodrigo that he is considered Olga's accomplice for having harbored her while she was committing a crime. Eduarda visits Roseta ready to kill her, Amelia arrives just in time to avoid a misfortune. Martín discovers that Amelia and Rodrigo are dating and confronts them for having lied to him about their love. Martín asks Iván to get him out of La Fortuna, as he cannot forgive Amelia for falling in love with Rodrigo.
31	"Sus caricias son veneno"	14 October 2024	2.20
Olga manages to regain her freedom, but by court order, she will not be able to leave town and must continue to share a roof with Rodrigo. Amelia confronts Rodrigo about Jorge's video, he tries to explain to her what really happened, but she refuses to hear anything more from him. After learning that Rodrigo and Amelia are no longer together, Olga decides to fight to get him back; even Héctor supports her. Despite her love for Rodrigo, Amelia decides to do the right thing and report him for the death of her father.
32	"Rodrigo es adoptado"	15 October 2024	2.34
Héctor begs Amelia not to report Rodrigo for fear of revenge from the thugs in prison. Héctor becomes news all over town when he suddenly faints in the middle of the street. With the help of Roseta and Francisco, Alfonso organizes a surprise dinner to ask Xanat to be his wife. Rodrigo worries when he learns that Iván knows he is adopted, because thanks to his obsession, he could discover his true identity.
33	"Eres adoptado"	16 October 2024	2.44
Iván throws it in Amelia's face that he is already in a relationship with Candy hoping that jealousy will force her to get back together with him. Iván makes use of his detective skills to discover the real reason why Tomás doesn't have any pictures of his pregnant mother. Tarek surprises Eduarda with his arrival and ready to help her solve whatever obstacles there are to getting the land they want. Iván forces Tomás to confess the truth about his past and discovers who his biological parents really are.
34	"La esperanza de un futuro distinto"	17 October 2024	2.24
Iván discovers the tragedy of his biological family, making him doubt the identity he wishes to adopt from now on. Amelia discovers Rodrigo at the Tropicaloso with Olga and decides to use Tarek's interest to make him jealous. The reinauguration of the Tropicaloso is a success and Francisco decides to take advantage of the occasion to make public his relationship with Roseta. The municipal president discovers the accusations against Samuel and decides to cancel his business deal, risking Eduarda's business.
35	"La nueva presidenta municipal"	18 October 2024	2.35
While Iván fears for Tomás' life, he notices the closeness with which Amelia supports him and sees it as an opportunity to win her back. Seeing the risk she runs with Samuel behind bars, Eduarda orders his silence for good before it is too late. Eduarda decides to take advantage of the death of the municipal president to run for office again, assuring that it is the only way to recover her business with Tarek. Iván reveals to Amelia that he discovered that he is adopted and his biological parents are Teresa and Clemente Covarrubias; Rodrigo is shocked to hear this.
36	"Una broma del destino"	21 October 2024	2.29
Now that he has assumed his true identity, Iván decides to join forces with Amelia in order to find his brother, Diogo, together. Rodrigo decides to stay away from Amelia forever now that he knows he fell in love with his brother's wife. Eduarda warns Amelia so that Iván doesn't think that being a Covarrubias means he can claim any part of La Fortuna. Arminda realizes that Eduarda hid from her which group home Bernardo was in to prevent her and Norberto from adopting him.
37	"También se miente por amor"	22 October 2024	2.37
Iván's efforts to find Diogo are beginning to pay off, as he has never felt Amelia as close to him as during his search. Martín confesses to Iván and Amelia that he feels strange things every time he sees Gina. Amelia sees the necessity of having to reject Tarek three times, as none of his proposals manage to convince her enough. Martín apologizes to Amelia for abandoning her and asks her for a chance to return to live in La Fortuna.
38	"Teresa estaba muy mal"	23 October 2024	2.44
Iván finds inconsistencies in Teresa's death, leading him to believe that she may have poisoned herself. Before leaving Tierra de Agua, Rodrigo asks Eduarda for a chance to confess his love for her. Arminda discovers that Eduarda has been paying Perpetua a generous sum in exchange for her silence.
39	"Hablemos con la verdad"	24 October 2024	2.21
Olga receives the news of her stepfather's death, so she and her sister must take some time to travel to the city. Eduarda takes Rodrigo to a hotel and he decides to use the moment to get her drunk in the hope that she will tell him all about her crimes. Amelia notices Rodrigo's new friendship with Eduarda and confronts her to find out exactly what kind of relationship they have.
40	"El gusto de tenerlo"	25 October 2024	2.39
After confirming the relationship between Rodrigo and Amelia, Eduarda decides to distance them and use Rodrigo to satisfy her feelings. Olga looks for Rodrigo to plant a kiss in front of Eduarda and to throw in her face that they were already boyfriend and girlfriend again. Perpetua demands Eduarda a position of power in her new government or she will be forced to tell everyone the secret she has kept for so long.
41	"Los terrenos de las caballerizas"	28 October 2024	N/A
Eduarda recalls her reasons for exchanging her baby to be raised by Amelia. Felipe demands that Nubia stop swindling people with her clairvoyance, but she blackmails him into revealing his dark past. Iván asks Eduarda to put the land of the stables in his name to pay off the debt for saving her from the swindlers. Amelia enters Eduarda's office and inadvertently manages to overhear her mother's interest in Rodrigo, even though she knows he is the man she loves.
42	"Hay muchas cosas que nos unen"	29 October 2024	2.20
Amelia confronts Eduarda for sleeping with Rodrigo even though she knew she loved him and decides to move out of La Fortuna. Gina prepares a romantic dinner for Olga and Rodrigo hoping it will be enough for them to reconcile. Amelia demands that Eduarda respect her decision to take Martín out of La Fortuna and Eduarda is forced to confess that Martín is her son.
43	"Te robaste a mi hijo"	30 October 2024	2.13
Amelia searches through the clinic's archives for information about Martín and the life of her deceased brother. Ramiro is caught by his ex-partners, but offers his life and fortune in exchange for Tina's freedom. Francisco asks for Amelia's understanding to do a paternity test on Martín and finally acknowledge him as his son. Iván is furious when he remembers the accident that prevented him from being by Amelia's side when she was in labor and flees, hoping to get into problems to escape his guilt.
44	"Padre es el que cría"	31 October 2024	2.15
Fearing for Iván's life, Rodrigo manages to convince Eduarda that he should stay in the hospital waiting for news. Iván confesses to Amelia that he had an accident on purpose, while assuring her that after discovering that he is not Martín's father, he no longer has anything in the world. Ramiro returns to Tierra de Agua hoping to have the support of the people, but Tina's father recognizes him and reveals his deceit. Gina overhears Héctor talking about Eduarda's secret and runs to Martín to reveal what is being said about him.
45	"El dolor que causan los secretos"	1 November 2024	1.71
Now that she knows Jorge Nieto is alive, Amelia regrets having despised Rodrigo for believing he was a criminal. Rodrigo confesses to Amelia the real reason he had to fake her father's death and she agrees to help him in his struggle to find the truth. Martín asks Amelia if she is his mother, but Eduarda interferes, hoping that he will accept her as his biological mother. Olga reveals to Amelia Rodrigo's investigation and he is forced to confess that he is in fact Diogo Covarrubias.
46	"Te voy a ver caer"	4 November 2024	2.05
Rodrigo explains why he wants to bring justice against Eduarda in the hope that Amelia will decide to join his cause. Amelia hears Eduarda confess that she was Clemente Covarrubias' lover and despises her for betraying her boss who trusted her so much. Amelia reveals to Iván that Alfonso is also his brother and asks him to keep Martín away from La Fortuna, as Eduarda has provoked many arguments by revealing her secrets. Amelia makes it clear to Martín that despite Eduarda's revelations, she will always see him as her son.
47	"Tienen que denunciar a su madre"	5 November 2024	2.14
Thanks to Rodrigo's help, the newspaper of Tierra de Agua makes public the frauds that Eduarda has committed using the foundation as a front. Eduarda tells Iván that she knows his true intentions behind his new interest in finding Diogo; Rodrigo finds out everything. Roseta is forced to tell everyone that she lost her baby in order to protect him from Eduarda. Amelia learns that she is expecting Rodrigo's child and Olga decides to kill her to win him back.
48	"Cuentas congeladas"	6 November 2024	N/A
Iván discovers that Olga tried to poison Amelia and files a complaint against her to make her pay for her crime. Amelia is forced to cancel her therapies and live with Arminda while the police determine who is behind the foundation fraud. Iván takes advantage of Amelia's pregnancy to try to win her back by offering to recognize her child as his own. By accident, Xanat manages to record Eduarda confessing all the crimes she has committed to make her business with Tarek a reality.
49	"Adiós, Eduarda"	7 November 2024	2.20
Alfonso is transferred to prison, where he is beaten for being from a wealthy family. Amelia despises Eduarda for daring to blame Alfonso for her frauds and is ashamed to be her daughter. Amelia and Rodrigo organize a plan to force Eduarda to confess to all her crimes and thus achieve justice. Thanks to Lía's interference, Xanat discovers all the crimes Eduarda confessed to Tarek without knowing they were being recorded.
50	"La sangre debe pesar más"	8 November 2024	2.26
Iván shows Eduarda documents that prove that Rodrigo is Diogo; she, upset, decides to play along with him, but asks Iván for help to do so. Eduarda gives Jorge his money but shoots him in the back. At the hospital, Jorge apologizes to Amelia for not being the father she needed and confesses that Eduarda was the one who had Diogo kidnapped, but she did not kill his father, but he did in an act of spite. Amelia agrees to forgive her father, who takes his last breath without receiving Diogo's forgiveness. Eduarda confronts Rodrigo for deceiving her about Jorge's death and unmasks his identity. Iván tells Diogo that he is aware that they are brothers; Diogo apologizes for not telling him earlier because he had to keep his identity secret to make Eduarda collapse. Eduarda seeks out Martín to tell him that she will turn herself in to the police if and only if he accompanies her or she will run away forever. Seeing that Martín is taken from her and that she is surrounded by the police, Eduarda shoots Diogo and Iván, while trying to stop her, is mortally wounded. Tarek demands that Eduarda give him the money, but the two threaten to kill each other. He shoots first and wounds her, but Diogo arrives and ends Tarek's life. A year later, Amelia and Rodrigo get married accompanied by the big family they have formed. Francisco informs Eduarda that she will spend the rest of her life in prison, she mocks him assuring him that this will not stop her and that her revenge has just begun. She also reveals to him that Martín is not his son, but from the affair she had with Tarek Soto. Amelia and Diogo enjoy their love and vow to be together forever by the tree where their love began when they were young.
