= The Stepmom =

Mexican telenovela

- Spanish: La madrastra
- Genre: Telenovela
- Based on: La madrastra by Arturo Moya Grau
- Developed by: Gabriela Ortigoza
- Written by: Rosa Salazar Arenas; Ricardo Tejeda; Fermín Zúñiga; Anthony Martínez; Juan Carlos Tejeda
- Directed by: Sergio Cataño; Héctor Márquez Campos
- Starring: Aracely Arámbula; Andrés Palacios; Marisol del Olmo; Juan Carlos Barreto
- Theme music composer: J. Eduardo Murguía; Mauricio L. Arriaga
- Opening theme: "Necesito encontrarte" by Aracely Arámbula and Carin León
- Composer: Manuel A. Vázquez Terry
- Country of origin: Mexico
- Original language: Spanish
- No. of seasons: 1
- No. of episodes: 50

Production
- Executive producer: Carmen Armendáriz
- Producer: Abraham Quintero Botello
- Cinematography: Víctor Soto; Rodrigo Curiel; Rodrigo Rodríguez
- Editor: Noé Galindo
- Production company: TelevisaUnivision

Original release
- Network: Las Estrellas
- Release: 15 August – 21 October 2022

The Stepmom (Spanish: La madrastra) is a Mexican television series produced by Carmen Armendáriz for TelevisaUnivision. It aired on Las Estrellas from 15 August 2022 to 21 October 2022. The series is a reboot based on the 2005 Mexican telenovela of the same name, and the fifth production of the Fábrica de sueños franchise. The series stars Aracely Arámbula and Andrés Palacios.

== Plot ==
During a trip to Spain, Marcia Cisneros is accused of murdering Nicolás Escalante and is sentenced to 35 years in prison. Esteban Lombardo, her husband, considers her not only a murderer but an adulteress who killed her lover to cover up her betrayal, so he abandons her and files for divorce. Marcia is certain that she is innocent and that among her ex-husband's friends is the murderer, so she studies law while in prison to reopen her case.

Twenty years later, a lawyer manages to get her early release and she returns to Mexico to clear her name and be reunited with her children, but they believe her dead. Lucrecia, Esteban's older sister, placed a portrait of an unknown woman in their home and the children grew up adoring the woman in the portrait. Marcia summons all the suspects, who are shocked to see her, but to win over her children and investigate each of the suspects, she changes her name and introduces herself as Marisa Jones. Marcia forces Esteban to break up with his fiancée in order to marry her, thus becoming the stepmother to her own children.

== Cast ==
- Aracely Arámbula as Marcia Cisneros / Marisa Jones
- Andrés Palacios as Esteban Lombardo
- Marisol del Olmo as Lucrecia Lombardo
- Juan Carlos Barreto as Father José Jaramillo
- Martha Julia as Florencia Linares
- Marco Treviño as Donato Rivas
- Cecilia Gabriela as Emilia Zetina
- Juan Martín Jauregui as Bruno Tejeda
- Isadora González as Inés Lombardo
- Denia Agalianou as Paula Ferrer
- Eduardo España as Rufino González "El Tortuga"
- Montserrat Marañón as Cándida Nuñez
- Ricardo Fastlicht as Francisco "Pancho" Nuñez
- Epy Velez as Violeta Pardo
- Carmen Muga as Alba Bermejo
- Adrián Di Monte as Álvaro González
- Iker Madrid as La Condesa
- Alberto Pavón as Iñaki Arnella
- David Caro Levy as Hugo Lombardo Cisneros
- Ana Tena as Lucía Lombardo Cisneros
- Emiliano González as Rafael Lombardo Cisneros
- Julia Urbini as Celia Nuñez
- Sebastían Fouilloux as Omar Escalante
- Christopher Valencia as Pablo Nuñez
- José Elías Moreno as Santino González

=== Guest star ===
- Gabriel Soto as Nicolás Escalante

=== Recurring ===
- Vilma Sotomayor as Rebeca Escalante
- Palmeira Cruz as Betina
- Diego Soldano as Gaspar Iglesias

== Production ==
In October 2018, the series was announced to be part of the Fábrica de sueños franchise. In May 2022, the series was presented during the Univision upfront for the 2022–2023 television season, with Aracely Arámbula and Andrés Palacios being announced in the lead roles. Filming began on 6 June 2022.

== Episodes ==
No.	Title	Original release date	Mexico viewers (millions)
1	"Asesinato a sangre fría"	15 August 2022 (Note: Premiere early online through Las Estrellas website on 12 August 2022.)	3.1
Marcia and Esteban indulge in passion. Rebeca thinks that Nicolás is unfaithful. Nicolás sends a message to Marcia warning her that he is going to kill himself, she tries to stop him, but when she gets to her room, she receives a blow to the head, causing her to be blamed for Nicolás' death. The judge rules that Marcia is guilty and she must spend 35 years in prison. Esteban asks Marcia to confess if she was Nicolas' lover. Esteban gives part of the company's shares to his family in exchange for not revealing his wife's scandal. Twenty years later, Marcia manages to get out of jail.
2	"Todo el derecho de volver a amar"	16 August 2022	3.4
Esteban confronts his children when they oppose his relationship with Paula. Lucrecia asks Emilia to tell Paula not to show up at Esteban's wife's death anniversary. Esteban is determined to rebuild his life with Paula so he proposes to her. Marcia gets out of jail and asks Iñaki to take her to the hotel where Nicolás lost his life, she begins to remember everything she experienced before his death. Esteban is disappointed in his son Hugo. Florencia learns about Esteban's relationship with Paula. Marcia discovers how Nicolás was murdered.
3	"Para tus hijos estás muerta"	17 August 2022	3.5
Florencia confronts Esteban for his engagement to Paula, he rejects her when he learns of her feelings. Iñaki helps Marcia find clues about Nicolás' murderer. Lucrecia threatens Paula and demands that she stay away from Esteban. Bruno confronts Florencia about her love for Esteban. Álvaro visits Lucrecia and blackmails her with showing an intimate video of her if she refuses to give him money. Marcia is determined to return to Mexico to find out the truth. Lucrecia asks her niece and nephews to ruin their father's engagement party. Father José informs Esteban that he will not be able to get married in church. Florencia confronts Emilia for having betrayed her. Marcia returns to Mexico and the first thing she does is visit Father José who, upon seeing her, reveals that her children think she is dead. Florencia threatens Esteban with telling the truth.
4	"Esta farsa se acaba hoy mismo"	18 August 2022	3.1
Father José tells Marcia that Esteban and Lucrecia got rid of all her memories to the point of putting another woman's portrait in their house, and Marcia confesses to Father José that Nicolás' murderer is among all the people who made the trip. Esteban reveals to Omar that his father was murdered. Paula asks Lucrecia for 50 million pesos to get away from Esteban. Esteban learns that Paula left town after Lucrecia offered her money in exchange for leaving him and confronts his sister. Marcia confuses her son Hugo with Omar and faints. Marcia starts following all her enemies and finds Esteban kissing Paula. Marcia organizes a dinner for Esteban and her enemies to witness her return.
5	"Lo que por derecho me pertenece"	19 August 2022	3.1
Marcia shows everyone that she has them all in her sights and is ready to unmask the real culprit behind Nicolás' death. Marcia asks Esteban to confess the whole truth to her children because she plans to get closer to them. Father José introduces the Lombardo children to Marcia, she is speechless. Despite Florencia's pleas, Esteban refuses to reinstate her, especially because of Marcia's return. Lucía shows up at her father's party dressed as a clown and this provokes criticism among the guests. Álvaro shows up unexpectedly at Esteban's party to look for Paula's money. Marcia meets with Esteban in her suite and when Esteban refuses to tell his children the truth, she faints.
6	"Renunciar a mi derecho de madre"	22 August 2022	3.1
Omar realizes that Marcia has met with Esteban, but is not discouraged from trying to win her over. To support Celia, Esteban decides to hire Pablo as a philosophy teacher for Lucía. In order to woo Lucía, Álvaro goes to Paula and blackmails her into taking over his millionaire life. Knowing that there is some kind of relationship between Álvaro and Paula, Lucía decides to use the information to try to get Paula away from her father.
7	"Me enterraste en vida"	23 August 2022	3.0
Although Santino has denied any of Marcia's accusations, she still doubts that he was telling the truth. Lucrecia visits the Father José and threatens Marcia with not going near her own children again. Florencia assures that there is something between Álvaro and Paula, for which she is willing to pay any price to unmask her. Hugo tries to get Paula to stay away from his father, but it is she who ends up threatening to take Esteban away from them. Esteban cannot stop thinking about Marcia and prefers to propose to Paula to bring forward the date of their wedding.
8	"Voy a acabar con esa boda"	24 August 2022	3.0
Omar convinces Marcia to go to dinner with him, where he shares the pain he went through after Nicolas' murder. Lucrecia warns Esteban that if he marries Paula and moves out, Marcia might move back home. Florencia asks for Lucrecia's help to get evidence against Paula to prevent her marriage to Esteban. Pablo arrives at Lucía's house determined to continue with his classes; when he sees that she does not listen to him, he takes Lucía's cell phone. Marcia confronts Bruno to continue her investigation and discovers that Santino lied to her.
9	"Un peligro mayor"	25 August 2022	3.0
Santino is admitted to the hospital; upon learning of this, Marcia fears that he will take the identity of the real killer to his grave. On leaving Lucía's house, Pablo runs into Álvaro, realizing the scam he is about to put Lucía through. To Paula's surprise, Lucrecia arrives at her store to offer her help in planning the wedding. Omar takes Marcia to his parents' grave, where Marcia vows to find out who the real murderer was. Inés visits Marcia at the hotel to try to get her to leave her children alone by appealing to their well-being.
10	"Quítate la máscara de hombre honesto"	26 August 2022	3.0
With Álvaro's visit, Lucrecia takes the opportunity to invite him to dinner to get to know him better, the family realizes that what he says is not true. Esteban demands his family to support him with his wedding, Lucrecia surprises her nephews by agreeing with him. Emilia warns Paula that it would be best if she marries Esteban quickly, as delaying the ceremony puts their union at risk. Esteban offers Omar to move him to Miami to keep him away from Marcia, but he notices and asks if he is still interested in Marisa Jones. Emilia confronts Marcia for everything she has suffered because of her and lets her know that she had no reason to kill Nicolás.
11	"Te quiero lejos de mis hijos"	29 August 2022	3.0
Emilia learns that she lost her baby. Esteban finds out of Santino's illness. Marcia seeks to gain her children's trust with the help of Father José. Emilia remembers that 20 years ago she lost a child to Nicolás. Hugo asks Lucía not to get her hopes up with Omar, since he is interested in his father's ex-girlfriend. Santino asks Violeta to destroy everything he has stored in a box under his bed the day he dies. Lucrecia proposes to Paula to live in the house now that she marries Esteban. Paula becomes jealous when she learns that Esteban is still seeing Marcia. Lucía confesses to Omar that she loves him, he rejects her and assures her that he only sees her as a sister. Esteban demands Marcia to stay away from his children. Marcia manages to sneak into the file cabinet and takes some documents, but Hugo walks in.
12	"Una parvada de cuervos"	30 August 2022	2.9
Álvaro makes a pass at Lucía. Rafael agrees to help his aunt and invites his brother and sister out. Emilia falls into a deep depression and Florencia asks her to tell her if she killed Nicolás, Emilia denies everything and assures Florencia that she only took revenge on Marcia, as they all did in the trial. Esteban is upset at Marcia for meddling in his company, she assures him that she is only looking for evidence to prove she is innocent. Santino leaves his entire fortune to his stepbrother, his friends oppose his decision, but Esteban asks them to accept his last will. Marcia surprises Santino and assures him that not even with his life will he pay for all the damage he did to her. Lucrecia invites all the family's friends to her house and makes them believe that she is going to celebrate Inés' birthday, but in reality she moved up Esteban's wedding to Paula. Marcia arrives at the celebration.
13	"En donde hubo fuego..."	31 August 2022	3.1
Marcia makes it clear to all her enemies that she doesn't care about Esteban and if she came back, it is to get her children back and find Nicolás' murderer. Paula insists Esteban get married. Esteban forbids Lucrecia to meddle in his personal affairs. Lucrecia discovers that Father José's friend is the woman Omar rejected her for. Marcia informs Father José that Esteban threatened to report her if she insists on talking to her children. Santino asks for security personnel to be sent when he sees Marcia at his house. Paula seeks to know more about Marisa and contact hers. Lucía takes advantage of the fact that she is alone with Omar in his apartment to kiss him. Esteban helps Santino to find the whereabouts of his stepbrother. Marcia arrives on time for her appointment with Paula.
14	"Me está llevando al límite"	1 September 2022	3.3
Marcia is surprised by Paula's interest in meeting her, Marcia assures her that she does not intend to win back Esteban's love. Lucrecia shares with her nephews that Marisa cheated on their father with another man. Florencia and Emilia know that if they reveal the truth about Marcia their husbands will be out of a job. Marcia thanks Celia for helping her the day she fainted in Omar's office, but Celia tells her that her presence makes her uncomfortable. Marcia challenges Esteban to tell their children the truth. Omar continues the investigation into his father's murder. Esteban tells Donato and Bruno that Marcia found clues in the dead file about Nicolas' killer. Alvaro asks Esteban for a job. Omar assures Lucía that Lucrecia hates all women who approach her father, so he doubts that what she told them is true. Marcia finds Antonio Gil's whereabouts. Omar assures Marcia that he only wants to be her friend. Álvaro visits his father to give him money. Marcia meets a man who can help her prove her innocence.
15	"Lo voy a arriesgar todo"	2 September 2022	2.9
Marcia asks Gaspar not to cancel his agreement with Esteban. Lucía does not want to take Pablo's class, he wants an explanation and when he sees her, he kisses her. Donato begins to investigate Rufino. Pablo tells Esteban that he fell in love with Lucía. Gaspar helps Marcia look for Antonio Gil. Donato steals a kiss from Bettina and reveals that he is interested in her. Omar invites Celia to lunch and assures her that they are only friends since he is in love with Marisa. Lucía confesses to Father José that Marisa is her rival since Omar is in love with her. Marcia arrives at Esteban's house to tell the truth, but Lucrecia stops her and when she sees Lucia, Hugo and Rafael, Marcia assures them that Esteban proposed to her because he still loves her.
16	"No queremos una madrastra"	5 September 2022	2.9
Lucrecia, upon learning of Marcia's plans with Esteban, asks her nephews to ally with her to prevent the engagement. Donato surprises Bettina with an apartment and proposes that she be his girlfriend. Marcia is frustrated for not telling her children the truth and hopes that Esteban will come to his senses for both their sakes. Lucía asks Álvaro to take her to San Felipe to talk to Pablo, but he is afraid he will be recognized. Lucrecia does not want Álvaro near her niece. Álvaro fights with Pablo when he learns that he kissed Lucía. Emilia visits Paula and asks her to donate an egg so she can become a mother. Gaspar informs Esteban that Marcia will be his representative in the company.
17	"Tu nueva novia solo busca banco"	6 September 2022	2.9
Gaspar assures Esteban that he cannot believe he doubted Marcia's fidelity. Donato and Bruno fear that their other business dealings will be discovered. Iñaki asks Marcia to get the fingerprints of all her enemies. Donato tells Marcia that thanks to her, Emilia cannot be a mother. Omar insults Marcia by assuring her that she is Gaspar's mistress, she slaps him. Marcia is interested in knowing what Esteban has told Paula about her. Marcia proposes to Hugo to work as her assistant, he declines the offer. Marcia assures Florencia that Esteban would never have fallen in love with a woman like her. Lucía sees Marisa in her house and insults her. Esteban prevents Marisa from telling his children the truth and kisses her in front of them.
18	"Bienvenida al infierno"	7 September 2022	3.1
Lucrecia believes that Marisa is manipulating Esteban. Lucía threatens to leave the house if her father marries Marisa. Esteban breaks off his engagement to Paula. Hugo informs Omar of his dad's wedding to Marisa. Omar resigns from Esteban's company. Paula confronts Marisa when she learns that she took Esteban away from her. Inés confesses to Rafael that she had a relationship with Bruno years ago. Santino learns he has cancer. Paula seduces Esteban. Florencia looks for Álvaro to propose to him to seduce Marisa in exchange for a lot of money. Marcia suffers an attack and finds an anonymous death threat.
19	"Me condené a la soledad"	8 September 2022	2.9
Omar learns that his father was murdered in a hotel. Marisa asks Hugo to give her a chance to prove to him that she is not a bad person. Lucia takes Pablo to her special place and he asks her to be his girlfriend. Marcia hires Alvaro as her assistant. Donato finds Rufino and tries to convince him to be his legal proxy; however, Esteban prevents Rufino from signing the document. Hugo goes to the airport to pick up Marisa's friend Alba, with the intention of finding out more details about his father's future wife. Santino asks Rufino for forgiveness, but Rufino doesn't accept since Santino hurt him a lot when he was a child. Emilia reveals to Paula that Marisa was in jail. Santino tells Marcia that he sent her the message from Nicolás' phone for her to go to his room, but assures her that he is not the murderer.
20	"Este matrimonio es una farsa"	9 September 2022	2.8
Marcia asks Santino to confess the truth to Esteban. Hugo believes that Marisa's friend is his father's daughter. Santino dies in the arms of Esteban. Marcia tells Alba that she is going to marry Esteban and asks her to be her witness. Marcia arrives at Santino's funeral and asks Father José if Santino was able to reveal who killed Nicolás. Paula asks Esteban if he knew that Marisa was in jail, Marisa accepts that she was in prison for a crime she did not commit. Paula tries to make Marisa jealous, but Marisa assures her that she has no problem with her and Esteban being lovers. Celia gives Esteban her resignation, but he rejects it and asks for her help in getting Omar to return to the company. Rufino learns that Santino left him a fortune. Iñaki wants to prevent Marcia's wedding to Esteban, but she assures him that she must do it because it is the only way to be close to her children.
21	"Vivir con víboras"	12 September 2022	3.1
Paula blackmails Emilia to tell her the whole truth about Marisa and in exchange she will give her her egg. Marcia is upset with Alba when she learns that she was the one who called Iñaki to prevent her wedding. Jimena meets Marcia and assures her that she is a murderer. Paula surprises Esteban in his office and proposes that he spend his wedding night with her. Marcia arrives to live at Esteban's house and they announce to Lucrecia that they are already married. Inés reveals to Marcia that Rafael is not Rebeca's son. Esteban assures Marcia that he plans to spend his wedding night with the woman he loves.
22	"Trucos baratos"	13 September 2022	3.0
Esteban assures Paula that he cannot make her his mistress. Emilia believes that Donato is cheating on her with another woman. Marcia and Esteban believe that Hugo was kidnapped. Marcia asks Esteban to take a DNA test on Lucía to clear up any doubts. Omar informs Marcia and Esteban about Hugo's whereabouts. Lucía returns to the house and assures Lucrecia that she will give her stepmother a chance. Iñaki continues to search for the person who hurt Antonio Gil. Hugo asks his brothers to unite to get rid of Marisa. Lucrecia meets with Emilia and Florencia to create a plan to make Esteban believe that Lucía is indeed Nicolás' daughter.
23	"Daría todo por un abrazo"	14 September 2022	2.9
Father José refuses to reveal to Marcia who Nicolás' murderer is. Esteban's attitude makes Lucía think he hates her. Paula visits Marisa and assures her that she was with Esteban, Marisa congratulates her for becoming her husband's mistress. Rafael keeps thinking about Jimena. Esteban reiterates to Hugo that Alba is not his daughter. Lucía suffers from the rejection of Pablo and her family. Esteban assures Omar that he married Marisa to protect him from a past that could hurt him. Marcia is reunited with Santino's mother.
24	"Como mande la señora"	15 September 2022	2.2
Marcia informs Iñaki that Santino left a trust to take care of his mother until the day she dies. Lucrecia takes a sample of Lucía's hair to send for DNA testing. Donato confirms to Emilia that he convinced Paula to be her egg donor. Marisa invites Lucía and Hugo to dinner, but they turn her down. Marcia complains to Esteban about the way he has raised their children. Florencia makes a pass at Rufino. Donato convinces Betina to be the egg donor for his cousin. Rafael surprises Jimena at school and invites her for a walk. Hugo begins to investigate Alba's past. Bruno and Florencia try to gain Rufino's trust. Lucía finds Pablo kissing another woman, she is disappointed and looks for Álvaro. Marcia discovers who Antonio Gil met with before he died.
25	"Pagar el precio"	16 September 2022	2.6
Inés discovers that Bruno created a fake profile to meet her, he asks her to give him another chance and kisses her. Lucía sleeps with Álvaro, he assures her that he wants a formal relationship because he loves her. Lucrecia warns Marcia that if Rafael dies, she will be the one responsible. Esteban prevents Lucrecia from denouncing Marcia. Marcia questions Ines if she is Rafael's mother, she confirms it and says that Esteban helped her so that she would not be singled out. Marcia believes that all she is doing is distancing herself from her children. Marcia confronts Florencia and assures her that she already knows that she killed Nicolás.
26	"Montar un teatrito"	19 September 2022	3.1
Marcia confronts Florencia and assures her that she is Nicolás' murderer, Florencia denies everything, but admits that she did send the anonymous letters. Esteban spies on Marcia while she is taking a bath. Celia invites Omar to dinner and kisses him. Marcia begins to investigate about Lucía. Esteban tries to spend the night with Marcia. Marcia learns about Lucía's hideout. Florencia looks for Álvaro for a new attack against Marcia. Inés and Bruno resume their relationship. Florencia forces Álvaro to betray Marisa. Hugo tries to make Alba jealous with his friend. Rufino is determined to pay for La Condesa's surgery. Marcia falls into Florencia and Álvaro's trap.
27	"Nada es imposible"	20 September 2022	2.9
Florencia manages to record Marcia with Álvaro to manipulate the video. Lucía finds Marisa leaving Álvaro's apartment. Marcia accepts that she still has feelings for Esteban. Esteban is clear with Paula and that their relationship will be just friends. Florencia shares with Lucrecia and Emilia what she plans to do with the video. Marisa wants to help Lucrecia clear up her misunderstandings with Pablo so she asks Omar for help. Florencia tries to convince Rufino to accept a position in the company. Lucía admits that she was never in love with Omar. Lucrecia mocks Marisa when she sees that none of her children pay any attention to her. Lucrecia organizes a dinner in honor of her brother's wedding. Lucía tells her truths to Pablo, he calms her down with a kiss.
28	"Una oportunidad para que triunfe el amor"	21 September 2022	2.8
Marcia refuses to be intimate with Esteban. Marcia discovers that Hugo has a condition that is causing him problems with women. Iñaki assures Jimena that Esteban may also be her father's murderer. Lucía and Pablo decide to give each other another chance. Jimena learns that her father's case was closed. Hugo agrees to work for Marisa. Marisa rejects Paula's job and tells her to wait for her proposals. Hugo asks Alba for a chance. Florencia tries to surprise Esteban completely naked in his bedroom, but he kicks her out. Esteban receives the photographs of Marcia with Álvaro.
29	"Sacar las uñas"	22 September 2022	3.1
Marisa confronts Álvaro and questions him about his betrayal, he does not accept Florencia's money and decides to confess the truth to Marisa. Lucía proves to her father that Marisa's photographs were altered. Emilia receives good news about her pregnancy. Marisa thanks Lucía for her help. Esteban, upon learning what Florencia did to Marcia, does not want to see her again at the company. Esteban informs Donato that since Marcia's return, Florencia has not stopped harassing her. Lucrecia receives the DNA tests and confirms that Lucía is Esteban's daughter.
30	"Date permiso de amar"	23 September 2022	2.9
Paula tells Marisa her disagreement with the contract to be signed. Emilia advises Lucrecia to alter the DNA results. Lucrecia learns that Lucía informed Esteban that Marisa's photographs were altered. Florencia threatens Marcia. Esteban admits that he still loves Marcia. Marcia confirms that Esteban is not Nicolás' murderer. Omar tells Lucía that it was Marisa who arranged the meeting for her to reconcile with Pablo. Bruno informs Florencia that she is no longer a shareholder of the company.
31	"No merece tu perdón"	26 September 2022	2.8
Marcia asks Iñaki to remove Esteban from the list of suspects. Lucrecia assures Esteban that he has already fallen into Marcia's trap. Celia surprises Omar with her new image and tells him that she is willing to return to the company under certain conditions. Emilia confesses to Inés that she is expecting a baby. Marisa asks Omar to talk to Hugo to find out what is wrong with him. Hugo reveals to Omar that he has problems having sex. Inés tells Father José that she is dating a married man. Inés asks Bruno to divorce his wife. Marcia makes a scene with Esteban.
32	"Muy pronto volverás a mí"	27 September 2022	3.3
Bruno assures Ines that he does not intend to give up his fortune. Rufino learns that Bruno is Florencia's husband. Lucía wants to take Pablo to her house, but he thinks it is not the best time. Esteban refuses Paula's invitations. Florencia assures Bruno that it is very easy to manipulate Rufino. Hugo denies to his sister that he has a sexual problem. Paula is invited by Lucrecia to the family dinner, but Lucía makes her uncomfortable with her questions. Paula asks Esteban if he has already slept with Marisa. Florencia lies to Rufino about her husband. Luis Dominguez is arrested.
33	"Jamás voy a recuperar a mis hijos"	28 September 2022	3.0
Lucía, seeing that Paula is still visiting Esteban at his house, asks Marisa to have a little dignity. Iñaki informs Marcia that Luis Dominguez will be transferred to Mexico City. Esteban looks for Paula to break up with her. Marisa begins to tell Lucía what her mother was like. Lucrecia receives the altered DNA test results. Bruno learns that Luis was arrested. Inés assures Lucía that Marisa did not lie to her when she told her about her mother. Lucrecia arrives at Esteban's office and gives him the DNA test which proves that Lucía is Nicolas' daughter.
34	"Me temo lo peor"	29 September 2022	3.2
Marcia slaps Lucrecia and assures her that the DNA test is another one of her traps. Marcia is kidnapped. Esteban plans to send Lucía to study abroad, but she thinks it is Marisa's idea. Lucrecia tells Florencia what happened with Marcia and Esteban. Hugo meets Iñaki and asks him questions about Alba. Emilia informs Paula that Marisa is finally out of Esteban's life, so now she must win him back. Lucrecia tells Hugo, Lucía and Rafael that Marisa will no longer return to the house since they discovered that she is an opportunistic woman. Esteban sends a message to Marcia to ask for a divorce and the head of security of her company informs him that Marisa has been kidnapped.
35	"¡Ayúdenme!"	30 September 2022	2.8
Lucrecia asks Paula to stay out of Marisa's business and hopes that she will not get involved with Esteban again. Jimena tells Rafael that she suspects where Marisa might be. Omar swears to Celia that whoever is responsible for his father's death will pay with their life. Esteban and Iñaki file a report for Marcia's kidnapping. The authorities begin to interrogate people close to Marisa to find her whereabouts. Marcia escapes, but at that moment Esteban arrives and rescues her, she faints.
36	"Alguien quiere eliminarte"	3 October 2022	3.2
Esteban manages to transfer Marcia to a hospital for evaluation. Emilia discovers that Donato is cheating on her. Lucrecia fears that Esteban will forgive Marcia. Marcia learns that Esteban was the one who rescued her, she reiterates that Lucrecia is lying. Pablo breaks up with Lucía when he sees that she is still with Álvaro. Esteban learns of Marcia's illness. Marcia begs Esteban to perform a second DNA test on Lucía. Iñaki refuses to let Marcia return to the Lombardo house, but Marcia asks him to respect her decision. Lucrecia learns of Marcia's condition. Paula gives up hope that Esteban will get back together with her. Lucía takes a home pregnancy test and confirms that she is expecting a baby.
37	"Tiempo al tiempo"	4 October 2022	3.3
Inés tells Marcia that she has proof of her infidelity since Hugo showed it to her. Lucía promises to be less rude to Marisa. Marcia warns Lucrecia that she will expose her and all her lies. Cándida sees Lucía and complains to her for what she did to Pablo and forbids her to go near him. Florencia proposes to Bruno to take Esteban out of the company. Esteban informs his children that they will all have a security guard until they find the person responsible for Marisa's kidnapping.
38	"Estoy convencida que es una mujer"	5 October 2022	3.3
Alba accepts that she has feelings for Hugo, Marcia demands her to stay away from her son. Hugo refuses to stay away from Alba's life, but she threatens to report him for harassment. Marisa learns about Omar's investigation. Lucía assures Álvaro that she needs time to sort out her ideas. Rafael asks Jimena to be his girlfriend, but first he tells her about his illness. Jimena shows a photo of Florencia to Marcia and assures her that she is the woman she recognizes the most. Emilia confronts Donato about his modeling agency. Esteban learns that Lucía is pregnant, so he asks Álvaro to respond as a man.
39	"Mi mayor desilusión"	6 October 2022	3.1
Esteban assures Marcia that he does not intend to be the mockery of society with Lucia's pregnancy. Lucía learns that her father wants her to marry Álvaro and confesses to Marisa that her baby could also be Pablo's. Marcia concludes that Estaban wants to marry Lucía out of revenge that she is not his daughter. Lucrecia tries to lay a hand on Lucía, but Marisa stops her. Lucrecia confronts Marcia for putting up a photograph of herself. Lucía agrees to marry Álvaro.
40	"Tu futuro depende de una palabra mía"	7 October 2022	2.8
Álvaro gives the engagement ring to Lucía. Lucía tells Rafael that she will take the wedding money to escape. Lucía shares with Marisa that since she was a little girl her father has always shown his rejection of her. Lucrecia advises Lucía to give up her baby for adoption and Inés calls her out for what she did 18 years ago. Rufino, advised by Florencia, calls a board meeting to request the dismissal of Esteban as president of the company and of Marisa. When Pablo learns of Lucía's pregnancy, he demands that she tell him if the baby is his.
41	"Rodeado de buitres"	10 October 2022	3.5
Rufino refuses to vote against Esteban. Pablo confronts Álvaro and assures him that he made Lucía fall in love with him through lies. Iñaki shows Marcia evidence to find the real murderer. Rufino discovers Florencia's true intentions and kicks her out of the house. Inés, seeing that Lucrecia keeps meddling in her life, puts a stop to her. Álvaro is interested in finding his father now that he knows he inherited a fortune. Lucía learns that Rafael plans to sleep with Jimena. Marcia teases Lucrecia when she sees that things are not going as planned and in revenge, Lucrecia spikes Marcia's drink with a substance.
42	"Sé lo que hiciste"	11 October 2022	3.3
Marcia makes a proposal to catch Antonio Gil's murderer. Rafael and Jimena are interrupted by Lucía. Esteban informs Donato that he no longer plans to give him shares in the company. Lucrecia spies Inés with Bruno. Marcia assures Jimena that they are about to discover her father's murderer. Marisa becomes annoyed with Paula when she sees that she does not follow her directions. Florencia, Lucrecia and Emilia receive an anonymous letter that upsets them. Esteban accepts in front of Marcia that he paid for Donato and Bruno's silence with shares in the company. Alba accepts that she fell in love with Hugo, Marcia, feeling betrayed, kicks her out of the company.
43	"¿No tienes corazón?"	12 October 2022	3.6
Lucrecia meets Florencia at a bar to inform her that Bruno is cheating on her with Inés. Hugo confronts Marisa when he learns that she has fired Alba from the company. Alba reveals to Hugo that she was in prison with Marisa. Florencia confronts Inés and assures her that Bruno will remain her husband until she decides to separate from him. Marisa confronts Álvaro for his lies, fires him from the company and assures Esteban that he is only after the family's money. Rufino reveals to Lucía that he is Álvaro's real father, Álvaro confronts his father for telling the truth. Marcia is threatened with death.
44	"Me las van a pagar"	13 October 2022	3.4
Marcia assures Esteban that the only thing she is looking for is who of his friends is involved in her kidnapping and shows him her clues. Lucía learns that she was a finalist in the photography contest. Lucrecia seeks out Jimena to tell her that an orphan like her cannot belong to her family. Marisa tells Lucía that she is the one who entered her in the photography contest. Marcia assures Lucrecia that the only thing she is looking for is to have control over Esteban since she is still in love with her brother, Lucrecia slaps her. Esteban takes a sample of Lucrecia's hair. Esteban threatens Paula with a lawsuit for not fulfilling the contract, she in revenge goes to Marcia's office and shoots her.
45	"Algo más fuerte que el amor"	14 October 2022	3.2
Marcia manages to save herself and Esteban asks her to file a complaint against Paula. Emilia helps Paula escape. Florencia agrees to give Bruno a divorce. Paula, seeing Esteban's rejection, decides to make an attempt on her life. Jimena learns that she will have to return to Cancun. Rafael assures his aunt Lucrecia that he hates her for separating him from Jimena. Marisa confesses to Paula that she is Marcia Cisneros, she begs her to stop Lucía's wedding to Álvaro since they were lovers and all he is after is money. Rafael is rushed to the hospital, but his condition is critical. Omar discovers that his father's murderer is Marcia Cisneros.
46	"Me voy feliz"	17 October 2022	3.4
Rafa says goodbye to each member of the Lombardo family. Inés informs Lucrecia that Rafa has died. Inés reveals that Lucrecia and Bruno are Rafael's real parents. Esteban kicks Lucrecia out of the house. Rufino asks Álvaro to stay away from Lucía, otherwise he will regret it. Lucía refuses to marry Álvaro and returns his engagement ring. Bruno confesses to Florencia that he had a son with Lucrecia. Esteban approves of Lucía giving herself a chance with Pablo. Álvaro asks Rufino for a large sum of money to get away from Lucía. Omar discovers that Marisa is his father's murderer.
47	"Implorando perdón"	18 October 2022	3.6
Marcia reiterates to Esteban that she is not Nicolás' murderer, he assures her for the first time that he believes in her innocence and asks for her forgiveness. Florencia reveals to Marcia that Emilia was Nicolás' lover and in exchange for confessing more truths about the possible murderer, she asks her to drop all the charges against her. Lucía is examined by a doctor and confirms that she is not pregnant. Lucrecia returns to the Lombardo mansion ready to confess Marisa's past, but Esteban manages to stop her. Marcia confirms that Emilia was Nicolás' lover and confronts her. Esteban informs Marcia that Omar already knows that Marcia and Marisa are the same person.
48	"Solo una carta por jugar"	19 October 2022	3.3
Father José comes to Marcia's defense when he sees that Omar is judging her without knowing what really happened in the past. Omar tries to hurt Marcia. Esteban confirms that Lucía is his daughter. Bruno sells his shares to Esteban and asks him not to say anything to Donato. Marcia manages to forgive Santino. Inés asks Esteban to initiate legal proceedings against Lucrecia for altering the DNA test. Inés organizes a romantic dinner for Marcia and Esteban. Betina makes an announcement against Esteban's company.
49	"¿Es usted nuestra madre?"	20 October 2022	3.2
Donato asks Bruno to follow his instructions so that they are cleared of the scandal involving Esteban, Marisa asks Betina for an explanation and she assures her that she was a victim of Dante Alberti. Inés informs Emilia that Lucía is Esteban's daughter since he proved it by performing a DNA test. Inés confronts Lucrecia about the DNA test she altered and assures her that if she does not want to go to jail, she will have to accept Esteban's terms. Donato and Bruno are interrogated by Lieutenant Acuña and both disassociate themselves from the scandal that is linking Esteban. Marcia sees the man who is stalking her. Emilia reveals to Donato that the son she lost years ago was Nicolás'. Lucía questions Marisa if she is really his real mother.
50	"Sí existe la justicia divina"	21 October 2022	3.8
Esteban confirms to Lucía and Hugo that Marisa is their mother, they label her as a murderer and do not listen to any reason as to what really happened. Esteban and Marcia set a trap for Antonio Gil's murderer. Hugo finds all the clues that Marisa has collected to find Nicolás' murderer. Esteban saves Marcia's life. Donato is cornered by the police. Bruno reveals to Esteban and Marcia that he and Donato are Nicolas' murderers and tells them the reasons why they killed him. Donato tries to escape from the hospital but is caught. Lucía and Hugo ask their mother for forgiveness. Marcia visits Donato in jail and assures him that now he will live the hell she suffered. Lucrecia is arrested for attempting to kill Marcia. Donato and Bruno are beaten in jail. Emilia dies after giving birth, Betina gets custody of the baby. Lucrecia tries to commit suicide in her prison cell, but Florencia stops her. Esteban and Marcia renew their wedding vows.

== Reception ==
=== Ratings ===
Viewership and ratings per season of The Stepmom
Season	Timeslot (CT)	Episodes	First aired		Last aired		Avg. viewers (millions)
Season	Timeslot (CT)	Episodes	Date	Viewers (millions)	Date	Viewers (millions)	Avg. viewers (millions)
1	Mon–Fri 9:30 p.m.	50	15 August 2022	3.1	21 October 2022	3.8	3.10

=== Awards and nominations ===
Year	Award	Category	Nominated	Result	Ref
2023	Premios Juventud	My Favorite Actor	Andrés Palacios	Nominated	
2023	Premios Juventud	They Make Me Fall In Love	Aracely Arámbula and Andrés Palacios	Won	
2023	Produ Awards	Best Fiction Producer - Superseries or Telenovela	Carmen Armendariz	Nominated	
