= Carmen Armendáriz =

Mexican producer

- Born: 1946 (age 79–80); Mexico City, Mexico
- Occupation: Television producer
- Years active: 1988–present
- Parent: Pedro Armendáriz (father)
- Relatives: Pedro Armendáriz Jr. (brother)

Carmen Cecilia Armendáriz Pardo, known professionally as Carmen Armendáriz, is a Mexican television producer. She is known for producing entertainment and newsmagazine programs for TV Azteca and TelevisaUnivision, including Ventaneando and Hoy. She has also produced many telenovelas and scripted series, among them La hora marcada (1988), Yago (2016) and La usurpadora (2019).

== Career ==
Armendáriz began her career in 1988, producing Tony Tijuana and La hora marcada for Televisa. In the latter production, Armendáriz gave Oscar-winning filmmakers such as Guillermo del Toro, Alfonso Cuarón, and Emmanuel Lubezki their first opportunity to venture into directing and screenwriting. In 1996, Armendaríz joined TV Azteca, where she created and produced the newsmagazine program Ventaneando. Armendaríz left the show after a year and returned to Televisa to produce similar programs that would compete with her former show, including Hacer y deshacer (1997) and La botana (1997–2000).

From 22 August 2005 to 4 January 2008, Armendaríz produced the morning show Hoy. She returned to the show on 8 July 2009 after her replacement, Roberto Romagnoli, quit the program. Her second run with the show ended on 4 January 2013. Following her exit from Hoy, Armendariz created and produced the comedy series Cásate conmigo, mi amor. In 2016, she produced the telenovela Yago. In 2018, Armendaríz returned to producing newsmagazine programs with Intrusos. The show was canceled the following year and her next project would be La usurpadora, a reboot of the 1998 telenovela of the same name.

In 2022, Armendaríz produced María Félix: La Doña, a biographical series based on the life of actress and singer María Félix. That same year, she produced La madrastra, a remake of the 2005 telenovela of the same name. In September 2025, Armendaríz began producing her next telenovela, Mi rival, set to premiere in early 2026.

== Filmography ==
=== Television ===
| Year | Title | Notes | Ref. |
|---|---|---|---|
| 1988 | Tony Tijuana | Executive producer | |
| 1988–90 | La hora marcada | Creator and executive producer | |
| 1996 | Ventaneando | Creator and executive producer | |
| 1997 | Hacer y deshacer | Executive producer | |
| 1997–2000 | La botana | Executive producer | |
| 2000 | Aquí entre dos | Executive producer | |
| 2001 | Trapitos al sol | Executive producer | |
| 2005–08; 2009–13 | Hoy | Executive producer | |
| 2009 | Locas de amor | Executive producer | |
| 2013 | Cásate conmigo, mi amor | Creator and executive producer | |
| 2016 | Yago | Executive producer | |
| 2018–19 | Intrusos | Executive producer | |
| 2019 | La usurpadora | Executive producer | |
| 2021 | Te acuerdas de mí | Executive producer | |
| 2022 | María Félix: La Doña | Executive producer | |
| 2022 | La madrastra | Executive producer | |
| 2024 | El precio de amarte | Executive producer | |
| 2026 | Mi rival | Executive producer | |
| 2026 | Una familia complicada | Executive producer | |
