= Marcus Ornellas =

Brazilian actor (born 1982)

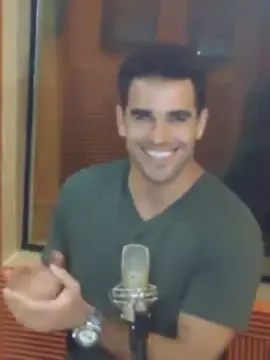
- Ornellas in 2026
- Born: Marcus Almeida D'Ornellas; 19 May 1982 (age 44); Caçapava do Sul, Rio Grande do Sul, Brazil
- Occupation: Actor
- Years active: 2011–present
- Partner: Ariadne Díaz (2015–present)
- Children: 1

Marcus Almeida D'Ornellas (born 19 May 1982) is a Brazilian actor. He is best known for working on Mexican telenovelas. Ornellas currently lives in Mexico City, Mexico.

== Personal life ==
Ornellas has a relationship with Mexican actress Ariadne Diaz since 2015. In May 2016 his first son was born named Diego, whom he had with Díaz.

== Filmography ==
Film roles
Year	Title	Roles	Notes
2012	El Arribo de Conrado Sierra	Father Tobías	
2016	Qué pena tu vida	Tigre	
2024	El roomie		
2026	Dark Horse	Flávio Bolsonaro	Filming

Television roles
Year	Title	Roles	Notes
2011	Dos hogares	Javier Ortega	Series regular; 120 episodes
2012–17	Como dice el dicho	Various roles	Series regular; 7 episodes
2012	Cachito de cielo	Rockberto	Episodes: "Consejos de amor" and "Infidelidad de Fabio"
2013	Libre para amarte	Lucas	Series regular; 107 episodes
2014	La rosa de Guadalupe	Genaro	Episode: "Un recado en el espejo"
2015	Muchacha italiana viene a casarse	Agustín	Series regular; 27 episodes
2015	A que no me dejas	Ariel	Series regular; 22 episodes
2016	Por siempre Joan Sebastian	Alfredo	Episode: "Maricruz un nuevo amor"
2016	Despertar contigo	Néstor	Series regular; 78 episodes
2017	Vecinos	Camilo	Episode: "Como en casa"
2017	40 y 20	Galán Jennifer	Episode: "Hollywood en casa"
2018	José José, el príncipe de la canción	Andrés García	Episode: "Persiguiendo la nave del olvido"
2018	Tenías que ser tú	Jacobo	2 episodes
2018	Falsa identidad	Porfirio Corona "El Corona"	Series regular (season 1); 87 episodes
2018	La Taxista	Álvaro Lizárraga	Series regular; 17 episodes
2020	Rubí	Lucas Morán	Main role
2021	Monarca	Jonás	Series regular
2021	Si nos dejan	Martín Guerra	Main role
2022	Mujer de nadie	Fernando Ortega	Main role
2023	Eternamente amándonos	Rogelio Iturbide	Main role
2024	El precio de amarte	Rodrigo / Diogo	Main role
2025	Doménica Montero	Luis Fernando Jiménez Lara	Main role
2026	Una familia complicada	Arsenio Navarro	Series regular
2026	¿Quién es la máscara?	Slash	Season 8 contestant
