= Alejandra Ambrosi =

Mexican television actress

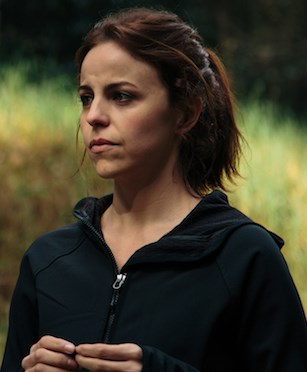
- Ambrosi in her role as Diana Estrada in Mexican television series La Hermandad
- Born: November 10, 1981 (age 44); Mexico City, Mexico
- Years active: 2005–present
- Children: 1

Alejandra Ambrosi Cortés (born 10 November 1987) is a Mexican television actress. Born in Mexico City, Mexico, she is known for participating in several Mexican telenovelas, series and films. She is best known for her remarkable characters in telenovelas such as Dulce amargo, Las trampas del deseo, and Las Malcriadas.

== Filmography ==
=== Film roles ===
Year	Title	Role	Notes
2005	Yo estaba ocupada encontrando respuestas, mientras tú simplemente seguías con la vida real	Ximena	Short film
2007	Yeah No Definitely	Nadia	Short film
2008	Navidad, S.A.	Liz	
2008	Eavesdrop	Clara	
2010	Depositarios	Carla	
2010	Cefalópodo	Emilia	
2011	Crímenes de lujuria	Jenny	
2011	Así es la suerte	Ana	
2011	Bacalar	Teresa	
2012	Hidden Moon	Camila	
2013	Me pesas en la cabeza	Sara	Short film
2013	Tlatelolco, verano del 68	Emilia	
2013	El edificio	Miranda	
2016	Manual de principiantes para ser presidente	Mara Mujica	
2017	La gran promesa	Elena	
2018	El club de los insomnes	Estela	
2022	Where Birds Go To Die		

=== Television roles ===
Year	Title	Role	Notes
2009	Hermanos y detectives	Marcelita	13 episodes
2011	El octavo mandamiento	Julia San Millán	
2009–2012	XY	Marisol	5 episodes
2011	Soy tu fan	Marce Berrón	
2012–2013	Dulce amargo	Camila Ramos	118 episodes
2013	Las trampas del deseo	Marina Lagos / Emilia Robaina	
2016	La Hermandad	Diana Estrada	14 episodes
2016	Por siempre Joan Sebastian	Mayka Jiménez	7 episodes
2016	Sin rastro de ti	Berenice Díaz	16 episodes
2016–2017	Vuelve temprano	Renata Zavaleta	
2017	Las 13 esposas de Wilson Fernández	Carolina	Episode: "Carolina"
2017–2018	Las Malcriadas	Stephanie Basurto	
2017	¡Ay Güey!	Susana	
2018	La jefa del campeón	Ángela	
2019	Preso No. 1	Carolina Arteaga	
2021	Luis Miguel: The Series	Karla Villegas	5 episodes
2022	El último rey	Paula Gómez	
2023	El amor invencible	Jacinta Hérnandez	
2023	La hora marcada	Fernanda	Episode: "Hermanas"
2024	El precio de amarte	Katia Figueroa	
2026	Hermanas, un amor compartido	Young Antonia Cué Romano	4 episodes
2026	Doc	Irene Andrade	Recurring role
2026	Guardián de mi vida	Georgina "Gina" González	
2026	Una familia complicada	Yadira	

== Awards and nominations ==
Year	Award	Category	Work	Result	Ref.
2011	Monte Carlo TV Festival	Outstanding Actress (shared with: Sophie Alexander-Katz)	XY	Nominated	
2013	Diosas de Plata	Best Supporting Actress	Hidden Moon	Nominated	
