= Yago (TV series) =

Mexican television series

- Also known as: Yago, pasión y venganza
- Genre: Telenovela
- Created by: Larissa Andrade
- Based on: The Count of Monte Cristo by Alexandre Dumas
- Written by: Fernanda Eguiarte; Alejandra Olvera; Tania Tinajero; Julio Cérsar Mármol
- Story by: Ay Yapım; Karem Deren; Pınar Bulut
- Directed by: Rodrigo Curiel; Eric Morales; Alfredo Kassem
- Creative director: Jorge Gaska
- Starring: Iván Sánchez; Gabriela de la Garza; Flavio Medina; Pablo Valentín
- Opening theme: "Yago"
- Composer: Giacomán de Neymet Alejandro
- Country of origin: Mexico
- Original language: Spanish
- No. of episodes: 65

Production
- Executive producer: Carmen Armendáriz
- Producer: Abraham Quintero
- Production location: Mexico City, Mexico
- Editor: Rodrigo Morales
- Production company: Televisa

Original release
- Network: Univision
- Release: May 2 – September 5, 2016

Related
- Ezel (2009–2011)

Yago (formerly known as Yago, pasión y venganza) is a Mexican telenovela produced by Carmen Armendáriz for Televisa. It is an adaptation (drastically changed) of the 1844 French novel, The Count of Monte Cristo by Alexandre Dumas, and is also a remake of the Turkish series, Ezel. The series featured 65 episodes.

The series stars Iván Sánchez as Yago, Gabriela de la Garza as Sara, Flavio Medina as Lucio and Pablo Valentín as Abel.

== Plot ==
Omar, a young man from Mexico City, is betrayed by his fiancée, Sara, and two close friends, in a failed robbery plot where he was framed as the perpetrator. After being unjustly imprisoned for 11 years and faking his death to escape during a prison riot, he undergoes plastic surgery to alter his appearance and plots revenge under his new identity, "Yago". Quite different from Dumas' plot, Yago is not empowered by discovering a treasure on an island, but by a mafioso type gang lord who has a long running feud with another mafioso type. In a tale of violence, gore, with sadistic torture and murder; the story explores the blessing vs curse of vengeance, as opposed to forgiveness.

== Cast ==
=== Main ===
- Iván Sánchez as Yago Vila / Omar Guerrero López
- Gabriela de la Garza as Sara Madrigal
- Flavio Medina as Lucio Sarquis
- Pablo Valentín as Abel Cruces Pérez

=== Recurring ===
- Manuel Ojeda as Damián Madrigal Ríos
- Patricio Castillo as Fidel Yampolski
- Rosa María Bianchi as Carmelina "Melina" López
- Juan Carlos Colombo as Jonás Guerrero
- Karina Gidi as Selma de Yampolski
- Mario Zaragoza as Camilo Michell
- Sophie Alexander as Katia Macouzet
- Ximena Romo as Ámbar Madrigal
- Enoc Leaño as Thomas
- Ricardo Leguízamo as Teófilo "Teo"
- Adrián Alonso as Bruno Guerrero López
- Fernanda Arozqueta as Alejandra Bautista
- Cassandra Sánchez Navarro as Ximena Saide Galván
- Jade Fraser as Julia Michell / Fabiana Yampolski
- Francisco Pizaña as Omar Guerrero López

== Production ==
The series primarily films in Mexico City and in other locations in Mexico. Production officially began on January 18, 2016. The series completed filming in mid-June 2016. The telenovela was originally called, Yago, pasión y venganza, but it was later changed to Yago. A teaser trailer and promos were released in early April 2016.

== Broadcast ==
Due to lackluster viewership, the show was initially cancelled and slated to be moved to Univision's sister network, UniMás. However, on May 23, 2016, it was announced that the program would remain a part of Univision's evening lineup with a time slot switch to 10 p.m. E.T., beginning on May 30. The program took a one-week hiatus from its usual broadcast, with the premiere of the telenovela drama, Tres veces Ana, taking over its original time slot. Because of continued low ratings following its new time slot, the series was moved permanently to UniMás and episodes airs at midnight E.T., beginning June 27, 2016. On August 23, 2016, Yago premiered in Mexico on Las Estrellas at 10:30 pm.

== Awards and nominations ==
Year	Award	Category	Nominated	Result
2017	35th TVyNovelas Awards	Best Series	Carmen Armendáriz	Nominated
2017	35th TVyNovelas Awards	Best Actress in Series	Gabriela de la Garza	Nominated
2017	35th TVyNovelas Awards	Best Actor in Series	Iván Sánchez	Nominated
