= Marisol del Olmo =

Mexican telenovela actress

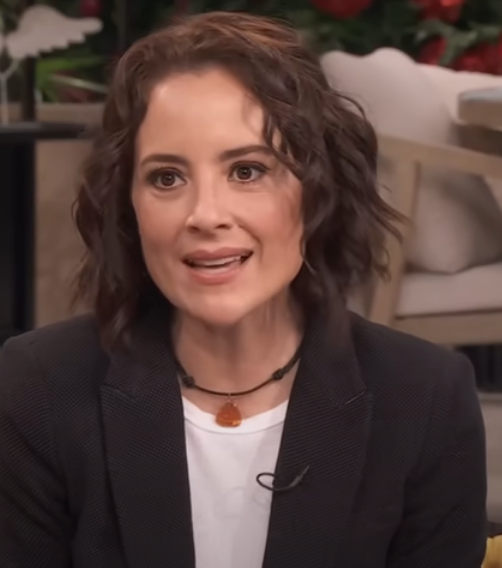
- del Olmo in 2022
- Born: May 9, 1975 (age 51); Mexico City, D.F., Mexico
- Occupation: Actress
- Years active: 1996-present
- Spouse: Pierre Angelo 1999-2010 (1 child)
- Website: https://www.twitter.com/MarisolDelOlmo

Marisol del Olmo (Spanish pronunciation: [maɾiˈsol del ˈolmo]) (born May 9, 1975) is a Mexican telenovela actress.

== Filmography ==
Television roles
Year	Title	Roles	Notes
1996	Sentimientos ajenos	Lupita	
1997	Pueblo chico, infierno grande	Leocadia	
1998–1999	El privilegio de amar	Antonia "Toña" Fonseca	Recurring role; 53 episodes
2000	La casa en la playa	Mireya Rodríguez	Recurring role
2001	El manantial	Mercedes	1 episode
2002	Clase 406	Eugenia Moreti	Recurring role; 5 episode
2003	Ladrón de corazones	Marcela	Recurring role
2005	Mujer, casos de la vida real	Unknown role	Episode: "Bonita e incauta"
2007	Pasión	Jimena Hernández	Recurring role
2008–2009	Mañana es para siempre	Erika Vallejo	Recurring role; 142 episodes
2008–2012	La rosa de Guadalupe	Various roles	Recurring role; 30 episodes
2010	Soy tu dueña	Gabriela Islas	Recurring role; 99 episodes
2011	El Equipo	Alma / Natalia Santillán	Recurring role; 8 episodes
2011–2012	Esperanza del corazón	Lorenza Duprís Dávila de Cabral	Supporting role; 145 episodes
2012	¿Quién eres tú?	Lucía Sabina	Recurring role; 120 episodes
2012	Como dice el dicho	Julia	Episode: "La familia que crece unida"
2013	Nueva vida	Brenda	Episode: "Señora mamá"
2013–2014	De que te quiero, te quiero	Irene	Main cast; 177 episodes
2015	Amor de barrio	Catalina	Main cast; 108 episodes
2015–2016	Estudio en la Calle St. Jude	Eva	Recurring role; 7 episodes
2016	El hotel de los secretos	Emma	Recurring role; 7 episodes
2016–2017	Perseguidos	María Guadalupe Luján Flores	Main role; 33 episodes
2017	Enamorándome de Ramón	Juana López	Recurring role; 117 episodes
2017	Papá a toda madre	Yuriria Bullegoyri	Guest role; 4 episodes
2018	La jefa del campeón	Salomé Salas	Main cast; 63 episodes
2019	Por amar sin ley	Rocio Arreola	Guest role (season 2); 3 episodes
2019–2020	Médicos, línea de vida	Constanza Madariaga	Main cast; 87 episodes
2021	Te acuerdas de mí	Ivana Castillo	Main cast; 76 episodes
2022	La madrastra	Lucrecia Lombardo	Main cast; 50 episodes
2023	Perdona nuestros pecados	Silvia Martínez	Main cast
2024	El ángel de Aurora	Jezabel Campero	Main cast
2026	El renacer de Luna	Maya Mistral	Lead role
2026	Una familia complicada	Lucrecia Navarro	Main cast
2026	Yo no creo en los hombres	Lucía	Main cast
2026	¿Quién es la máscara?	Carmela Tarantela	Season 8 contestant

== Awards and nominations ==
=== Premios TVyNovelas ===
Year	Category	Telenovela	Result
2008	Best Co-Star Actress	Pasión	Winner
2012	Best Co-Star Actress	Esperanza del Corazón	Winner
2014	Best Supporting Actress	De que te quiero, te quiero	Nominated
