= Una familia complicada =

- Genre: Drama
- Created by: Mafer Suárez
- Written by: Carlos Pascual; César Gándara; Adriano Madriles
- Directed by: Héctor Márquez; Mafer Suárez; Juan Carlos de Llaca
- Creative director: Enrique Arroyo
- Starring: Adriana Barraza; Marisol del Olmo; Marcus Ornellas; Oka Giner; Eduardo Maruri; Mayra Batalla; Marco Treviño; Alberto Estrella
- Composer: Manuel Vázquez Terry
- Country of origin: Mexico
- Original language: Spanish
- No. of seasons: 1
- No. of episodes: 20

Production
- Executive producer: Carmen Armendáriz
- Producers: Abraham Quintero Botello; Enrique Arroyo Schroeder; Andrea Sánchez Moyano
- Cinematography: Juan Carlos Lazo; Rodrigo Rodríguez
- Editor: Yivaldi Mondragón
- Camera setup: Multi-camera
- Production company: TelevisaUnivision

Original release
- Network: Vix
- Release: 26 June 2026

Una familia complicada is a Mexican drama television series produced by Carmen Armendáriz for TelevisaUnivision. It stars Adriana Barraza, Marisol del Olmo, Marcus Ornellas, Oka Giner, Eduardo Mauri, Mayra Batalla, Marco Treviño and Alberto Estrella. The series was released on Vix on 26 June 2026.

== Cast ==
=== Main ===
- Adriana Barraza as Telma Orozco de Navarro
- Marisol del Olmo as Lucrecia Navarro
- Marcus Ornellas as Arsenio Navarro
- Oka Giner as Layla Navarro
- Eduardo Maruri as Pepe Navarro
- Mayra Batalla as Telmita Navarro
- Marco Treviño as Alberto Navarro
- Alberto Estrella as Genaro

=== Recurring and guest stars ===
- Alejandra Ambrosi as Yadira
- Anabel Ferreira as Tita
- Ricardo Fastlicht as Father Francisco
- Úrsula Pruneda as Conchita
- Eligio Meléndez as Mariano
- José Sefami as Pancho
- Verónica Langer as Cuquita
- Moisés Arizmendi as Lorenzo
- Fernando Álvarez Rebeil as Güero
- Ana Tena as Ana
- Daniela Aedo as Claudia
- Nicolasa Ortiz Monasterio as Amelia
- Kenneth Lavill as Luis Ignacio
- Giovanni Conconi as Alberto
- Carlos Morett as Eliseo
- Ricardo Mangorich
- Victoria Dossio
- Raúl Adalid as Néstor
- Carmen María Kuri as Teresita
- Francisco Pizaña as Manolo
- José Daniel Figueroa as René

== Production ==
The series was filmed from October to December 2023. The project had two working titles, Mandatos de familia and Una sencilla familia complicada.

== Episodes ==
No.	Title	Original release date
1	"¿De dónde me salieron estos hijos?"	26 June 2026
2	"A la familia se le soporta"	26 June 2026
3	"El chisme que gira no siempre es mentira"	26 June 2026
4	"Parí unos cuervos desagradecidos"	26 June 2026
5	"Lo nuestro son bisnes"	26 June 2026
6	"Perdí el control de todo"	26 June 2026
7	"El eterno recuerdo de todo esto"	26 June 2026
8	"¡Sentir bonito es maravilloso!"	26 June 2026
9	"Todos hablamos solos"	26 June 2026
10	"¿A usted no le enseñaron a tocar la puerta?"	26 June 2026
11	"¡Tú me obligaste a hacerlo!"	26 June 2026
12	"Estamos aquí los que tenemos que estar"	26 June 2026
13	"Un hijo ingrato duele más que la mordida de una víbora"	26 June 2026
14	"Ahora es "mi cosita""	26 June 2026
15	"Toda nuestra vida nos hemos dedicado a soportar"	26 June 2026
16	"Tienes la mirada de una mujer libre"	26 June 2026
17	"Hasta para ser miserable se necesita un poquito de talento"	26 June 2026
18	"Lo que sea menos eso"	26 June 2026
19	"El amor no siempre funciona como pensamos que debería"	26 June 2026
20	"No me acuerdo de nada"	26 June 2026
