= Te acuerdas de mí =

Mexican telenovela by Televisa

- Genre: Telenovela
- Based on: Night Queen by Ozan Aksungur & Cüneyt Aysan
- Directed by: Francisco Franco
- Starring: Gabriel Soto; Fátima Molina; Guillermo García Cantú; Juan Carlos Barreto; Marisol del Olmo; Rebecca Jones
- Opening theme: "Ya No Me Acuerdo Más de Ti" by María José ft. Carlos Rivera
- Country of origin: Mexico
- Original language: Spanish
- No. of seasons: 1
- No. of episodes: 76

Production
- Executive producer: Carmen Armendáriz
- Producer: Abraham Quintero
- Production company: Televisa

Original release
- Network: Las Estrellas
- Release: 18 January – 3 May 2021

Te acuerdas de mí (English title: I've Known You All My Life) is a Mexican telenovela that aired on Las Estrellas from 18 January 2021 to 3 May 2021. The series is produced by Carmen Armendáriz. It is an adaptation of the Turkish series Night Queen, and stars Gabriel Soto and Fátima Molina.

The telenovela is streaming on Vix since 21 July 2022 and has a total of 86 episodes.

== Plot ==
Pedro Cáceres (Gabriel Soto) is married by convenience to the daughter of his tutor and boss. He decides to end the farce of his marriage when he falls in love with Vera Solís (Fátima Molina), whom he meets during a business trip. But Pedro's father, Olmo Cáceres (Guillermo García Cantú) threatens him to prevent him from breaking up his marriage. Pedro gives in to his boss's threats and abandons Vera. Years later, Pedro will meet Vera again, when she reappears as the girlfriend of his father-in-law.

== Cast ==
An extensive cast list was published on 4 September 2020 through the People en Español website.

- Gabriel Soto as Pedro Cáceres
- Fátima Molina as Vera Solís
- Guillermo García Cantú as Olmo Cáceres
- Juan Carlos Barreto as Fausto Galicia
- Marisol del Olmo as Ivana Castillo
- Rebecca Jones as Antonia Solís
- Alejandro de la Madrid as Julio
- Ana Bertha Espín as Delia Castro
- Pedro Sicard as Octavio
- Federico Ayos as Gastón Cáceres
- Enoc Leaño as Fuat
- Emilio Guerrero as Granados
- Natalia Téllez as Lola
- Josh Gutiérrez as Teo
- Markin López as Jacinto
- Anton Araiza as Alberto
- Nina Rubín as Faby
- María Penella as Marina Cáceres
- Mauricio Abularach as Gabriel Abadía
- Tamara Mazarrasa as Mélida
- Cuatli Jiménez as Gonzalo
- Alessio Valentini as Edy
- Moisés Arizmendi as Tomas
- Alejandra Bogue as Gladys
- Joan Santos as Silvio
- Hernan Romo as Tadeo
- Epy Vélez as Emilia
- Tamara Vallarta as Laiza
- Helena Rojo as Alicia Limantour
- Samuel Ledezma as Nico

== Production ==
The telenovela was presented during the Univision upfront for the 2020–2021 television season. Production of the series began on 14 September 2020 and concluded on 27 March 2021.

== Ratings ==
Viewership and ratings per season of Te acuerdas de mí
Season	Timeslot (CT)	Episodes	First aired		Last aired		Avg. viewers (millions)
Season	Timeslot (CT)	Episodes	Date	Viewers (millions)	Date	Viewers (millions)	Avg. viewers (millions)
1	Mon–Fri 9:30 p.m.	75	18 January 2021	3.2	3 May 2021	3.8	2.70

== Episodes ==
No.	Title	Original release date	Mexico viewers (millions)
1	"Quiero estar contigo"	18 January 2021 (Note: Premiered early online through Las Estrellas website on 15 January 2021.)	3.2
In 1985, Olmo mercilessly murders Tomás, Pedro's father. Years later, the love between Pedro and Vera is born from the first moment they meet. Vera does not hesitate to give herself to Pedro, feeling that he is the man of her life, while Marina discovers that she is expecting a son from Pedro.
2	"Una promesa de amor"	19 January 2021	2.6
Olmo orders Pedro to return to Mexico. Pedro knows that Vera is the woman of his life so he promises to return soon for her. Marina manages to communicate with Pedro and assures him that upon arrival she has great news for him. Gastón discovers Pedro kissing another woman.
3	"Un mal presentimiento"	20 January 2021	2.7
Marina takes advantage of the family meal to let people know that she is expecting Pedro's son. Ivana lets Marina know that Pedro was unfaithful to her in San Ginés. In her crisis, Marina suffers an accident while riding a horse and loses her baby. Julio serenades Vera. Antonia realizes someone is following her.
4	"Aquí voy a estar para ti"	21 January 2021	2.9
After learning that she lost her baby, Marina does not want to know anything about Pedro, he seeks his wife's forgiveness and she gives him another chance. Vera discovers that she is pregnant.
5	"No me busques más"	22 January 2021	2.6
When Pedro is about to see Vera again, he receives an intimidating message from Olmo that makes him make one of the most difficult decisions of his life. Vera tries to find Pedro to reveal her pregnancy, but he, under threat from Olmo, demands that her to leave his life, so she cannot tell him that she is expecting a child from him.
6	"Les presento a Vera"	25 January 2021	2.9
Vera arrives at the Cáceres family hotel for an interview, but during the meeting she has a problem with the manager, but Olmo arrives and comes to her defense. Olmo is shocked by the beauty of Vera and invites her to a family dinner, which Pedro also attends.
7	"Hay que creer en la familia"	26 January 2021	3.0
After seeing each other again at the dinner Olmo organized, Pedro believes that Vera returned to take revenge on him. Ivana gives Vera a humiliating moment. Pedro confronts Olmo for money laundering.
8	"Un error del destino"	27 January 2021	2.9
Pedro begins to feel jealous when he sees Vera very close to Olmo. Vera tells Julio about everything Pedro did to her. Pedro meets Nico and discovers that he is Vera's son.
9	"Dame una señal para amarla"	28 January 2021	3.0
Pedro, upon discovering that Vera is Nico's mother, wants to know if he is his son. Olmo takes Vera to a very special place and confesses his love. Gastón assures Vera that she means nothing in Olmo's life, so that she does not get any illusions. Olmo is worried since Vera doesn't make it to the meeting.
10	"Estoy loco por ti"	29 January 2021	2.9
Pedro asks Vera for a chance and kisses her. Pedro is convinced that Nico is his son. Vera is reunited with her dad. Olmo threatens Julio to tell him what his relationship with Vera is. Gastón sets a trap for Pedro.
11	"El futuro de Vera es lejos de cualquier Cáceres"	1 February 2021	2.6
Fausto confesses to Vera that he is her father and that the reason he left her is because Olmo tried to kill him. Vera says goodbye to Olmo and resigns from the company. Pedro asks Vera to agree to perform the DNA test on Nico, but upon seeing her refusal, he decides to take a saliva sample from him. Ivana threatens Edy. Fausto surprises Antonia and kills her.
12	"Una terrible casualidad"	2 February 2021	2.6
Vera suffers when she sees her mother dead. Jacinto shows Vera a video in which Olmo is seen entering the hotel minutes before Antonia lost her life, so he asks her to take care of herself from the Cáceres family and to accept Fausto's help. Pedro begs Vera for another chance.
13	"Conocer sus debilidades"	3 February 2021	2.7
Fausto convinces Vera to stay with Olmo, since that will be the only way to know his weaknesses and thus be able to take revenge on him. Lola arrives at Antonia's funeral and Vera confesses to her that the answers about her mother's death, will be known by living with the Cáceres family. Olmo finds Vera and Pedro together.
14	"Momento de atacar"	4 February 2021	2.7
When Ivana sees that Vera begins to have certain privileges in Olmo's house, she gets upset and makes the Cáceres family have an uncomfortable moment. Pedro informs Vera that he performed the DNA test on Nico. Gastón threatens Pedro. Olmo finds out that Julio and Vera were dating many years ago. Edy discovers that his grandfather is Antonia's killer.
15	"Lo hice para protegerte"	5 February 2021	2.9
Marina opens her heart and shares with Vera that years ago she lost her baby, after learning that Pedro had met another woman in San Ginés. Pedro talks with Vera and confesses that everything he did was to protect her from Olmo, since he was willing to take revenge on the woman who killed his grandson.
16	"La bala que hará estallar su corazón"	8 February 2021	2.7
Olmo sets a trap for Julio at the council meeting, but Vera, realizing who he really is, decides to be ruthless against the head of the Cáceres family. Pedro asks Vera to fight for their love, since he is ready for anything. Olmo shows Vera that her mother's murderer has been arrested. Vera and Olmo kiss in front of Ivana and Pedro.
17	"Debilidad"	9 February 2021	2.6
Fausto suggests that Vera "attack" Olmo where it hurts the most. After feeling vulnerable, Marina attempts to end her life. Olmo questions Vera about Nico's father and she tells him the whole story. Pedro discovers that Vera had some financial statements stolen and confronts her. Vera receives a photo where she is kissing with Pedro.
18	"Somos vulnerables"	10 February 2021	2.6
After what happened with Nico, Ivana apologizes to Vera. Now that Olmo began his relationship with Vera, he seeks to know Pedro's opinion. Vera meets with Fuat and he confesses all of Olmo's evil deeds. Julio discovers that Fausto is Vera's father.
19	"Una mala racha"	11 February 2021	2.6
Pedro complains to Vera for upsetting Marina more with the idea of having children. To show that she can be an excellent mother, Marina takes Nico to the adoption center but her attempt was not very helpful, since with that action, she showed that she is not well. Julio meets with Vera in a cafe and confirms that her father is alive to which she replies that she already knew the truth. Olmo orders security to be reinforced after learning that Bosco was killed.
20	"Un beso de buenas noches"	12 February 2021	2.8
Ivana informs Olmo that Vera is at her mother's house with Julio, so he is willing to do anything to avoid losing Vera, but what he does not imagine, that he fell into the trap of Vera, Julio and Fuat. Olmo proposes to Vera.
21	"El enemigo siempre está en la misma casa"	15 February 2021	2.6
Vera asks Olmo for time to give him an answer to their engagement. Vera when trying to find out more information about Olmo, drugs him and begins to seduce him, so he falls into her trap. Ivana discovers Vera in Olmo's office.
22	"Cheque en blanco"	16 February 2021	2.4
Ivana gives Vera a blank check so that she can write the amount she wants so she can leave Olmo alone, but Vera assures her that when she marries Olmo, she is the one who will be left over. Vera manages to convince Marina to suspend the idea of becoming a mother through a surrogate mother. Olmo will have to choose between Ivana or Vera.
23	"En el amor y en la guerra todo se vale"	17 February 2021	2.6
Ivana tries to convince Olmo of Vera's poverty, but Fuat contradicts her. Ivana humiliates Vera and Lola, after they rejected her request, so she rips one of their designs. Pedro asks Ivana for an explanation for what she did to Vera and she tries to blackmail him. Granados is attacked in Belize. Vera agrees to marry Olmo.
24	"Decisión tomada"	18 February 2021	2.8
Vera confesses to Pedro that she got engaged to Olmo, so he feels very disappointed. Olmo asks Ivana that for the good of all, it is best that she leave the house now that he is engaged to Vera. Vera convinces Olmo to go to the cabin for a few days and manages to find the hideout. Marina will adopt Tatiana's baby whether Pedro likes it or not.
25	"Otra vida"	19 February 2021	2.6
Vera returns to Olmo's cabin for evidence, but upon entering the hideout she realizes that there is nothing left. Octavio confronts Ivana about the past they had. Pedro surprises Vera in the cabin and confirms that he broke up with Marina. Olmo asks Pedro to make an effort and support Marina with the idea of adopting the baby. Pedro leaves the Cáceres mansion.
26	"Vientos de cambio para los Cáceres"	22 February 2021	2.2
Pedro confesses to Teo that he married Marina on Olmo's orders, so he knows it was a mistake. Marina goes into depression because of Pedro's departure. Ivana pretends to smooth things over with Vera to look good with Olmo. Vera manages to enter Alberto's suite and when trying to open the safe, she is discovered by Teo.
27	"Una vida perfecta"	23 February 2021	2.3
Teo takes Vera out of the room and when he wants to investigate what she was trying to do, Pedro finds them. Olmo and Vera have a photo shoot for a famous magazine and they are questioned about their love. Olmo demands the head of Granados. Marina and Pedro fight again, Vera listens to them. Pedro becomes Nico's hero, after finding Bingo. Vera is willing to tell Teo the truth.
28	"Garantizar la seguridad"	24 February 2021	2.6
After a kiss, Julio confesses to Lola that he is in love with her, but she refuses to show him her feelings, so she breaks his heart. Teo manages to save Vera from Pedro's questions. To help Vera, Teo places a closed circuit in Ivana and Alberto's room. Octavio surprises Ivana and emphasizes that he is sure that Fabi is his daughter. Lola decides to end the commitment she had with Julio. Fausto celebrates that things are going his way, so now he asks Vera to get Olmo to put all the shares in her name. Ivana begs Olmo to sign a prenuptial contract before marrying Vera, so he accepts. Vera begins to try on her wedding dresses and Pedro surprises her.
29	"Nunca he dejado de amarte"	25 February 2021	2.5
Pedro surprises Vera in her wedding dress test and does not hesitate to kiss her, Vera confesses that she still loves him and when the time is right she will tell him the reasons why she is going to marry Olmo. Teo gives Vera very good news. Vera signs the prenuptial contract in exchange for her being part of the Grupo Cáceres shares. Pedro assures Marina that whatever happens, she will always have a place in his heart.
30	"La ambición jamás se detiene"	26 February 2021	2.1
Vera promises Pedro that one day they will be able to be together. Laiza gives herself to Gastón. Tatiana arrives to live in the Cáceres' mansion. Olmo gives Vera the shares of Grupo Cáceres. Pedro meets with Marina and asks her to accept the advice of the people who love her. Laiza discovers that Gastón lied to her. Olmo feels very much in love so he assures Vera that he has many plans to carry them out with her. Laiza feels betrayed by Gastón, after what was published in a magazine. Jacinto shoots Fuat and Alberto threatens Teo for stealing the USB.
31	"¿Acepta como esposo a Olmo Cáceres?"	1 March 2021	2.5
Vera contacts Octavio, as she thinks something bad happened to her friend Fuat. Pedro is very confused by Vera's attitude. Octavio informs Vera that Fuat died and asks her not to raise suspicions, as Olmo may notice and both she and Nico may be in danger. Olmo surprises Vera with a wedding gift, but her attitude catches his attention. Gastón and Mélida begin treatment to be able to have a baby. Pedro thinks Vera stood him up again. Ivana shows Olmo some photographs of Pedro and Vera embracing, so Olmo forces Vera to marry him, as a proof of their love.
32	"La punta del iceberg"	2 March 2021	2.6
Vera agrees to marry Olmo to save Pedro. When Olmo sees Pedro in the hospital, he confronts him and seeks to know what he was doing with Vera in the hotel, so when he feels attacked, Pedro hits him. Pedro finds out that Olmo and Vera were married in a civil way and Pedro calls Ivana a "gossip" for telling Olmo what she saw at the hotel. Ivana takes advantage of the fact that Vera is alone to blame her for all the misfortunes that the Cáceres family faces. Olmo wonders if Pedro is capable of betraying him. Pedro is willing to help Vera with the investigations against Olmo Cáceres. Olmo receives the gift that Vera had prepared for him and she asks him to stop being suspicious, since there is nothing going on with Pedro. Vera seduces Olmo and they manage to have their wedding night.
33	"Vigilada y controlada"	3 March 2021	2.5
Olmo goes crazy on his wedding night and questions Vera about the times she has slept with Pedro in his own house. Marina asks Pedro to find Tatiana so she can change her mind and return the baby to her. Ivana announces to Vera and her entire family that she returned to the Cáceres mansion, so Vera complains to Olmo and he assures her that she needs to learn to get along with Ivana. Vera hands Pedro a letter. Julio begins his investigations and discovers who Pedro's father is. Marina asks Pedro to stay with her and he accepts.
34	"La novia más triste del mundo"	4 March 2021	2.9
Pedro arrives at Vera's room and asks her not to marry Olmo. Vera, knowing that she will join her life to that of a man she does not love, and breaks down in tears. Mélida confirms to Gastón that he will become a father. Marina gives Vera the brooch she wore on her wedding day. Ivana makes a toast to Olmo and dedicates a few words to him, Alberto notices Ivana's attitude and thinks she is acting out of spite. What seemed to be the wedding of the year, turns into a tragedy, after an armed commando interrupted the wedding of Olmo and Vera. Olmo is kidnapped.
35	"Recuperar al jefe"	5 March 2021	2.6
Vera confesses to Lola that she is grateful for not having married Olmo, Fausto manages to communicate with his daughter to find out how she is and she confronts him by assuring him that she feels betrayed. Marina goes into a state of shock, so Pedro decides to take her to her room, but Marina begins to ask about her mother as if she were alive, so he decides to go for help and upon his return, he finds Marina passed out. Gastón confesses to Pedro that he believes that Vera is the culprit of his father's kidnapping, but Pedro comes to Vera's defense. The police arrive at the Cáceres house to begin the investigations. Fausto gives Alberto a clue that will lead him to the author of the kidnapping.
36	"Todos son sospechosos"	8 March 2021	2.5
Agent Rocha informs Octavio that she has already opened a new line of investigation on the Cáceres family, making Vera the main suspect. Ivana cries when she sees a photograph of Olmo. Octavio surprises Ivana in her bedroom and begins to question her about Olmo's relationship with Granados. Octavio revives the relationship he had with Ivana a few years ago and reminds her that Olmo was the culprit in their separation, since he forced her to marry Alberto. Pedro visits Marina at the clinic and is surprised to see his wife's reaction, since she assures him that Tatiana is about to give birth and that her mother is with them to support them. Ivana manages to convince agent Rocha that Vera is the culprit of Olmo's kidnapping, since before marrying him, she acquired shares in Grupo Cáceres. Pedro demands that Vera tell him the truth about Olmo's illicit business. Agent Rocha informs the family that Olmo may be dead.
37	"Mantener bajo perfil"	9 March 2021	2.6
The suspicions towards Vera for Olmo's kidnapping continue and the press questions whether their relationship is real or for money, she will have to face the media. Ivana makes it clear to Vera that she will not rest until she sees her behind bars so that she can be able to take custody of her son. Pedro fears that his real father has actually been murdered.
38	"¡Está usted arrestada!"	10 March 2021	2.8
Pedro confesses to Vera that he is afraid of being left without his father figure again, since Olmo, even though he is not his biological father, was always with him and protected him at all times. Ivana gives Vera's cell phone to Agent Rocha. Granados falls into Fausto's trap and when trying to get his family back, he hands over Olmo, but Fausto shoots him. Alberto has the Granados family in his power. Agent Rocha informs Vera that she is being arrested for being a suspect in Olmo's kidnapping. Alberto releases the Granados family.
39	"Olmo se corta las venas"	11 March 2021	2.8
Octavio assures agent Rocha that what she is doing with Vera is out of protocol. Ivana asks Alberto for an explanation for his absence and he reproaches her for only thinking of rescuing Olmo. Lola arrives at the Caceres' mansion ready to take Nico with her, but Ivana forbids her to do so, so she gets upset and has a strong altercation. Lola assures Pedro of what Ivana is capable of. Pedro asks Ivana not to mess with Vera, since he will come out to defend her and assures her that she is the cancer of the Cáceres family. Olmo, seeing that he will not obtain his freedom, decides to make an attempt on his life.
40	"Nico es tu hijo"	12 March 2021	2.8
Ivana begins to bother Nico and Pedro comes to his defense, for which she assures him that he identifies with the minor because they are orphans. Pedro will have to prove that Judge Solares sold out. Vera begins to have a very bad time in jail. Pedro confesses to Lola and Julio that Ivana wants to deliver Nico to the authorities, so he is trying by all means that that does not happen. Vera is beaten in jail and Cándida comes to defend her. Cándida takes Vera to her cell to heal her wound. Vera takes advantage of the moment to learn the story of the woman who helped her. Ivana forbids Delia to sit down to eat with them and takes advantage of the moment to humiliate her. When Pedro sees that Ivana's next step is to send Nico to an orphanage, he proposes to Vera's lawyer that the best thing is for him to adopt Nico. Pedro visits Vera in jail and she confesses that Nico is his son.
41	"Estás destruyendo a la familia"	15 March 2021	2.7
When Pedro knows the truth, he swears to Nico that he will never leave him alone and calls him son for the first time. Vera assures Cándida that she is afraid that Pedro is leaving her alone, now that he already knows that Nico is his son. Pedro performs another DNA test on Nico to begin the process of custody of the minor. Lola and Julio will not allow Fausto to continue hurting people. Fausto finds out that the police are going after him and decides to set fire to his house, without thinking about Olmo. Ivana assures Alberto that she wants him as her accomplice.
42	"Prepararnos para lo peor"	16 March 2021	2.7
Octavio manages to enter the basement and rescues Olmo, but finds him very ill. Ivana discovers Fabi's tattoo and scolds her. Gastón asks Mélida to apologize to Delia. The doctor informs the Cáceres family that in order to save Olmo's life, they had to amputate his left leg. Vera celebrates that Olmo was rescued and is confident that she will soon be released from jail. Alberto enters Olmo's room and decides to disconnect him to cause his death. Marina asks Gastón if Pedro had anything to do with Vera. Vera sees Nico again.
43	"No es el mismo Olmo que recuerdan"	17 March 2021	2.8
Vera hopes that Olmo has pleaded guilty, so that she can get out of prison and be reunited with her son. Olmo assures Ivana that Fausto is alive. Olmo discovers that his leg was amputated, so he goes into a state of shock, Ivana tries to reassure her brother-in-law. Julio is struck by the relationship that may exist between Octavio and Ivana. Olmo finds out that Vera is in jail, Jacinto tries to hide the evidence against her. Vera will go to the punishment cell for trying to defend herself.
44	"La suerte de Vera está echada"	18 March 2021	2.7
Olmo tells Detective Rueda what really happened so that Vera can get out of prison. Pedro asks Vera if she is willing to go back to Olmo. Olmo confesses to Delia that now that he sees Vera he doesn't know how he is going to react. Alberto gets jealous when he sees how Ivana idolizes Olmo Cáceres. Cándida sells all her things inside the jail to rescue Vera from the punishment cell. Olmo trusts that Gastón's son is the future of the Cáceres. Olmo manages to get Vera out of jail and assures her that her freedom belongs to her. Vera is ignored by the Cáceres family. Andrés steals a kiss from Marina.
45	"Revivir recuerdos"	19 March 2021	2.5
Vera, seeing that Olmo distrusts her, asks him to return her to jail. Vera thanks Pedro for taking care of Nico throughout the night and tells him that Olmo did not let her go out of the bedroom. Gabriel doesn't want to let time go by and proposes to Laiza. Ivana shows Olmo the message that makes Vera a suspect in his kidnapping. Olmo surprises Vera with his attitude and assures her that in order to trust her, he must know everything she does. Vera proposes to Olmo to change the wheelchair for a prosthesis. Marina believes that Pedro is overindulging with Vera. Vera and Pedro agree that Ivana was the one who locked Nico in the cupboard, Pedro proposes to Vera to confess that he is the boy's father, but she rejects the idea. Delia sees Ramiro again. Alberto finds Ramiro Rendón and takes him to Olmo, who orders him to be killed for his betrayal. Vera confronts Ivana upon discovering that she had locked up Nico. Ivana calls Vera a traitor and slaps her, but Vera does not remain calm and returns the slap, causing them to fall down the stairs of the Cáceres mansion.
46	"Más fuertes que nunca"	22 March 2021	2.7
Olmo asks Vera and Ivana that she does not want to hear a dispute between the two of them again. Delia intercedes so that they leave Ramiro alone and reiterates that he is very wrong if he plans to see Laiza. Octavio learns that Olmo's kidnapping case has already been closed. Olmo is shocked when Vera shows him the prosthesis so that he can walk again. Fausto learns that the case for Olmo's kidnapping has already been closed by the Prosecutor's Office. Olmo confesses to Alberto that if he finds out that Pedro and Vera have love affairs, he will attempt on their lives, so when Vera listens to this conversation, she fears for the integrity of the people she loves the most. Julio suffers an attack.
47	"Lavado de dinero"	23 March 2021	2.7
Vera hears Olmo say that if he discovers that Vera and Pedro are in a relationship, he is capable of killing them. Ivana assures Olmo that there is nothing between her and Octavio. Laiza agrees to marry Gabriel. Octavio informs Ivana that there is an investigation against Olmo and Alberto for money laundering. Ivana and Octavio revive the flame of passion. Following Vera's request, Marina and Pedro leave the Cáceres mansion. When Ivana finds out about the money laundering business, she asks Alberto to be part of the team. Now that she lives alone with Pedro, Marina hopes that their family can grow. Olmo asks Vera to undress.
48	"Criminales somos todos"	24 March 2021	2.6
Pedro confesses to Vera that he wants to discover his past so that he can be free and thus live with her and Nico, so he is willing to confront Olmo. Ivana is surprised by the robbery that Fabi committed. Olmo assures Ivana that the enemy must be close by, so he asks her to make some sacrifices. Vera meets Fausto again and confronts him for having turned his back on her when she was in jail. Alicia humiliates Gonzo. Pedro questions Julio about the investigation he is carrying out on his past. Ivana has a date with El Chamaco. Andrés visits Marina in her apartment.
49	"No tientes tu suerte"	25 March 2021	2.5
Pedro and Vera are back together, so he takes advantage to tell her that Fausto killed his biological father. Andrés visits Marina in her apartment and kisses her. Gabriel finds Laiza with Gastón. After a rebellious attitude, Ivana assures Fabi that she is going to send her to study at boarding school. Olmo informs Ivana that she will be the one who closes the deal with El Chamaco. Olmo calms down the fight between Ivana and Alberto. Vera and Pedro arrive at the hospital and find out that Nico has a severe degree of anemia. Alicia continues to humiliate Gonzo and Ivana meets with El Chamaco, who makes her a proposal.
50	"El amor siempre traiciona"	26 March 2021	2.3
El Chamaco invites Ivana to his suite to close the deal in private. Alberto assures Ivana that they can still get their relationship back. Laiza asks Gabriel to advance the wedding date. Marina complains to Pedro that he never has time for her. Alicia arrives at the Cáceres group and puts Ivana and the entire committee in her place. Fausto threatens Julio. Marina finds the DNA test where she confirms that Nico is Pedro's son. Julio assures Fausto that he will continue to act on the council under the name of Raúl Bernal. Vera confesses to Fausto that she no longer trusts him. Marina surprises Pedro with her attitude. Gastón and Mélida find out that they will be the parents of a child. Vera and Pedro have a fleeting encounter and are surprised by Edson. Gonzo gets annoyed with Teo for Alicia's attitude. Marina takes Pedro's cell phone to send messages to Vera and thus set a trap for her.
51	"El corazón no entiende de razones"	29 March 2021	2.6
For fear that Olmo will find out the truth, Vera confesses to Marina that she was Pedro's lover, but it all ended when he assured her that he loved his wife and for that reason, she never told him that she was pregnant. Marina assures Vera that she will not tell the truth, since that would cause Pedro to leave her to go with his son Nico, but she conditions her that if Pedro leaves her, everything will be revealed. Marina tries to spend the night with Pedro, but he rejects her and assures her that he only sees her as a sister and that their marriage has already given what it had to give, so he asks for a divorce. Alicia accepts the capital increase in the Cáceres Group.
52	"Vengar la muerte de tu padre"	30 March 2021	2.6
Marina asks Vera to stay away from Pedro, otherwise the truth can be known. Vera meets Cándida again and takes the opportunity to introduce her to Pedro. Alberto learns that Ivana is sleeping with someone out of loyalty to Olmo, the company and the Cáceres family. Marina can't stand that Pedro is going to leave her so she enters in crisis. Olmo begins to receive messages and calls in order to intimidate him. Olmo asks Laiza to stay away from Gastón since he doesn't want anything to happen to her or her boyfriend. Gastón looks for Laiza on the day of her bachelorette party. Laiza assures Gastón that the best thing is for him to forget about her. Marina begs Pedro to accompany her to Laiza's wedding, since she does not want to raise suspicions that they are separated. Olmo reveals to Pedro that Fausto is alive and, since he killed his father, he asks him to do justice.
53	"Eres la desgracia de la familia"	31 March 2021	N/A
Gastón arrives at Laiza's wedding and asks her not to marry Gabriel, since he loves her. Olmo goes crazy when he sees his son's reaction and threatens him. Gabriel hits Gastón and Olmo warns Gabriel that it is the last time he will touch a Cáceres again. Lola assures Vera that it is best for them to distance themselves, since she feels very hurt by everything that is happening. Marina, seeing that Pedro no longer wants to go back to her, yells at him that she hates him. After a night of passion, Andrés lets Marina see that she is clinging to a world that does not exist. Vera and Pedro spend the night together and he assures her that he is jealous of Olmo.
54	"Juego sucio"	1 April 2021	2.2
Jacinto, upon being discovered by Tadeo, decides to end his life and lies to Fausto saying that he died at the hands of Ramiro's people. After pressure from Olmo, Pedro is about to reveal his relationship with Vera, but Marina intercedes, recognizing that her lover is Andrés. Pedro shares the video with Vera where Olmo suspects of Fausto and believes he is Tomás's murderer. Vera faces Fausto who denies everything and gives her new clues about the possible murderers.
55	"Un precio muy alto"	2 April 2021	2.2
Alicia arrives in town and introduces Rodolfo to Lola, Teo and Gonzalo; but soon Alicia realizes that her lover is a scammer. Ivana meets with El Chamaco. Octavio is forced to tell Fabi the whole truth, after she complains about his lack of honesty after learning that he is her mother's lover. Fabi confronts Ivana and begins a discussion with Alberto.
56	"Que estalle la bomba"	5 April 2021	2.5
When Pedro wants to protect Marina from Andrés, she confesses that she already knows the whole truth about his relationship with Vera. Delia confronts Olmo for threatening Laiza on her wedding day. Alberto arrives at Fausto's house and assures him that he wants to become his ally, but he asks him to return to the Cáceres and to continue being Olmo's right hand, otherwise he will be of no use to him. Pedro realizes that Andrés' intentions with Marina are honest and he leaves the way open for him. Ivana when seeing that Vera leaves the mansion without saying where she is going, believes that she is cheating on Olmo. Pedro meets with Vera and Nico to celebrate Antonia's birthday, but Ivana surprises them. Alicia accepts Teo's relationship with Gonzalo.
57	"El mito de don Olmo Cáceres"	6 April 2021	2.6
Marina assures Andrés that Pedro is in the past, so she is willing to start a new life with him. Olmo surprises Vera and Nico with some gifts. Fabi runs off with Edy. Marina, who feels very vulnerable because of everything she is experiencing, looks for her father and discovers him kissing her aunt Ivana. Olmo assures Ivana that his life belongs to Vera, but she reiterates that she will never forget the kiss they gave each other and how much she enjoyed it. Vera tells Pedro about the reasons why Olmo killed his mother, Pedro cannot accept that Olmo is a murderer. Laiza confesses to Marina that it is very likely that she has brain cancer. Marina can no longer bear so much pressure and is ready to make an attempt on her life.
58	"Solo se debe confiar en la sangre"	7 April 2021	2.6
Pedro questions Olmo about where he was the day Antonia was murdered, so he assures him that he does not have to give him explanations and less about his wife's mother. Vera asks Fausto for the video that blames Olmo for her mother's death, but he refuses it. Marina confesses to Andrés that she does not want to destroy her family by revealing Vera and Pedro's secret. Ivana receives a message from El Chamaco and asks to see her urgently, so Olmo assures her that she cannot let him wait since El Chamaco is very important to the company and business. Gastón, when listening to the heartbeat of his baby, is filled with emotion. Lola asks Vera to tell Pedro the whole truth. After several studies, the doctor confirms to Laiza that she has a brain tumor, but gives her little hope of life. Gastón reveals Laiza's illness to Mélida and breaks down in tears. Ivana finds out that El Chamaco can go with Fausto if they don't accept his request. Olmo upon learning that Ivana wants to seek out Fausto to take revenge, he assures her that he will not allow her to put herself in danger, so Alberto is the right person. Olmo confesses to Ivana that he would not forgive himself if something bad happens to her, so they kiss and Delia discovers them. Pedro meets with the man who was accused of murdering Antonia.
59	"Van a rodar cabezas"	8 April 2021	2.9
Ivana informs Olmo that she agreed to sleep with El Chamaco to obtain Fausto's contact and thus avenge all the damage he has caused him. Marina cannot erase the scene of the kiss between her father and her aunt Ivana from her head. Alberto informs Fausto that El Chamaco gave Ivana a large sum of money divided into two trucks, so he celebrates that they will soon have a great fortune. Marina confirms to Olmo that she is going to divorce Pedro. Olmo, upon learning that the United States shareholders canceled the Las Vegas project because of Vera, he reacts violently with his wife and assures her that because she did not send the design on time, the contract was canceled, so he throws her to the ground. Marina questions Olmo about the relationship he has with her aunt Ivana and he assures her that he is only very fond of her. Vera asks Olmo for her freedom. Ivana and Alberto have a terrible accident when they want to escape from the police.
60	"Alguien se tiene que comer la bala"	9 April 2021	2.8
Ivana communicates with Olmo and informs him that the police intercepted them, so he asks her to meet him at a hotel, but first she must throw away her cell phone and leave the bag since she may have a tracking device. Edy assures Pedro that he had nothing to do with Antonia's death. Vera assures Pedro that she contacted Octavio since she saw Ivana transport a truck full of money, so in this way she sought to prove that Olmo is a criminal. Fabi asks for an explanation about her dad's arrest. Ivana assures Olmo that if he falls, she will too, since she will never leave him alone. Ivana and Olmo have Mélida in their hands and are committed to falsifying Alberto's resignation from Grupo Cáceres. Pedro assures Olmo that he put an innocent man in jail. Olmo points a shotgun at Pedro and he asks him not to do anything that he may later regret. Olmo takes advantage of the fact that he is with Vera and Pedro and asks them to confess that they are lovers, Pedro finds out that Olmo put a hand on Vera and hits him. El Chamaco sends a message to Alberto. Vera promises Nico that they will soon leave the mansion.
61	"Vera es hija de tu peor enemigo"	12 April 2021	2.7
Alberto confesses to Olmo that Vera Solís is Fausto's daughter and she only married him to help her father get revenge. Olmo discovers that Alberto betrayed him. Alberto reiterates to Olmo that Vera is going to destroy him. Ivana lets Olmo know that Vera has always lied to him since she came into his life. Olmo informs Pedro that Vera is the daughter of his father's murderer, Vera confirms the news to Pedro and he refuses to escape with her. Ivana assures Alberto that he dies first before she steps in jail. Vera is subdued by Olmo's security, but Nico manages to escape and communicates with Pedro to inform him of what they did to his mother. Ivana does not forgive Vera for her betrayal and slaps her.
62	"Te voy a hacer pagar por lo que me hiciste"	13 April 2021	2.8
Vera arrives at the mansion and is immediately attacked by Olmo who asks her to tell him the whole truth and to take him to Fausto. Pedro is beaten by Olmo's security and assures him that he is forbidden to enter the house. Fabi becomes Pedro's accomplice. Olmo, maddened with courage, assures Vera that she must fulfill him as his wife, so he tries to abuse her, Vera seeks to defend herself and hits him hard on the head. Octavio discovers that Alberto committed suicide. Fausto meets with El Chamaco and hands him part of the money. Olmo receives a call from an unknown phone and thinks it is Vera, so he threatens her. Olmo arrives at Marina's house in search of Pedro, but realizes that his daughter is with another man. Fabi is sure her dad was killed. Laiza manages to regain her sight. Pedro confesses to Nico that he is his real father and Vera confirms the news to him. Olmo assures Ivana that Vera's betrayal hurts her. Fausto meets his grandson Nico.
63	"La venganza es un plato que se sirve frío"	14 April 2021	2.9
Olmo arrives at Marina's department and assures her that Vera's betrayal has him feeling very bad, so he invites her and Andrés to eat at the house. Ivana shows a loving attitude towards Fabi. Laiza assures Gabriel that they are not for each other. Pedro lets Edy know that Fausto is a criminal, so he begs him to tell him where he lives. Laiza breaks up with Gabriel. Vera begins to investigate the death of Tomás and finds Ramiro who confirms that Olmo is the murderer of Pedro's father. Pedro arrives at Fausto's house ready to talk to his father's murderer, but he assures him that Olmo, the man who always saw for him, was the one who killed Tomás. Olmo plans how to destroy Pedro and Vera's lives. Delia does not forgive Olmo for not helping her with Laiza's operation. During the family meal, Marina assures her father that what exists between Vera and Pedro is a true love and confesses that Vera is the woman of San Ginés and that Pedro is Nico's father. Jacinto pays Ramiro for telling Vera what is good for Fausto.
64	"Mátame como mataste a mi padre"	15 April 2021	2.7
Marina questions Ivana if she has already become her father's lover. Ivana tells what happened to Olmo and he asks her not to speak ill of his daughter or her friend. Delia assures Olmo that everything he is experiencing is the consequence of his bad deeds. Ramiro assures Pedro that he murdered Tomás on Olmo's orders and is ready to pay for what he did. El Chamaco communicates with Ivana to let her know that from now on, he will start working with Fausto Galicia. Olmo suspects that his enemy is preparing revenge. Fabi leaves the house and leaves a letter for her mother, where she asks her not to look for her since she does not want to live with criminals. Ivana asks Olmo to change his will, for his part, he assures her that he feels surprised, since he never imagined that his sister-in-law would become the most loyal person. Ivana arrives for Fabi at Octavio's house and assures her that she must go with her or else she will use force. Olmo dismisses Pedro from Grupo Cáceres, but is surprised by the arrival of Vera with Raúl Bernal.
65	"El último clavo de tu ataúd"	16 April 2021	2.4
Fausto assures Olmo not to try to harm him, otherwise he will go to jail. Pedro confesses to Teo that Olmo ordered the death of his father. Fausto assures Olmo that he is in control of everything, so his end will soon come. Laiza receives a letter from her father, but decides to throw it away. Ivana and Olmo agree that they must find allies to give Fausto a low blow. Teo thinks his grandmother Alicia is flirting with Fausto. Pedro becomes jealous of Julio and assures Vera that it is evident that he still loves her. Olmo tries to buy Alicia and she makes it clear to him that with such a person, she cannot negotiate. Olmo announces to Gastón that he is going to appoint him as the new Vice President of Grupo Cáceres. Octavio and Fabi confront Ivana in court. Vera questions Julio if he still loves her. Gastón informs Laiza of the agreement he reached with Mélida. Ivana tries to manipulate Fabi and assures her that if she does not follow her correct eating plan, she will gain weight again. Laiza refuses to become Gastón's lover. Edy confronts his grandfather Fausto and lets him know that he saw how he had Olmo kidnapped. Olmo in front of his wife's painting, admits that such stupidity almost cost him his life. Pedro makes it clear that he doesn't trust Fausto. Ivana bursts into tears and assures Olmo that she lost her entire family, first Alberto, then Fabi.
66	"Demanda de divorcio"	19 April 2021	2.8
Olmo, upon learning that Vera asked for a divorce, threatens to kill her if he sees her with Pedro. Ivana advises Olmo to sign the divorce so that his relationship with Vera ends. Olmo decides to burn all of Vera's belongings with the help of Ivana. Julio asks Vera for a chance, but Pedro listens to them. Ivana wants to stop being Olmo's lover. Julio confirms to Pedro that he is still in love with Vera, so he is willing to fight for her. Fausto takes his place as majority shareholder in Grupo Cáceres. Marina confesses to Pedro that she told her dad the whole truth. Fausto proposes as majority partner to create a new series of hotels, but Olmo opposes this project, since as president he has the last word. Fausto and El Chamaco celebrate that with the construction of these tourist complexes, they will be able to continue laundering money.
67	"El dulce perfume de la venganza"	20 April 2021	2.9
Olmo feels desperate as the family is at its worst. Pedro becomes indifferent to Vera and she assures him that he is behaving like Olmo. Mélida believes that something bad happened to her baby, since she does not feel movement, but the doctor asks her not to be alarmed and tells her that she is going to stay under observation. Olmo believes that with Ivana he has everything. Marina, Vera, Lola and Laiza have a girls' night. Vera assures her father that what she is looking for is justice, so she will not allow him to take advantage of her divorce with Olmo to achieve his plans, besides that she is not a bargaining chip. Vera asks Julio to stay away, since she only wants him as a friend. Fausto takes advantage of his closeness with Alicia to confess his love to her and ask her to become his life partner. Lola finds out that Bernardo has a 15-year-old daughter. Ivana sells her jewelry to raise the money owed to El Chamaco. Ivana and Olmo meet with El Chamaco to give him the money they owe him, but he rejects it since it is not even the slightest part of what they owe him and to compensate him he asks for the mansion, leaving Ivana and Olmo on the street. Vera and Pedro reconcile.
68	"Olmo manda matar a Pedro y a Vera"	21 April 2021	3.1
Olmo sees Vera with Pedro and is willing to kill them, since no one makes fun of him. Fausto prepares a party in his new mansion. Marina shares with Delia and Laiza that she has already divorced Pedro. Marina takes a pregnancy test and discovers that she expecting a child with Andrés. Olmo is determined to get revenge on Vera, so he kidnaps Nico. Alicia and Fausto formalize their relationship. Vera and Pedro, wanting to rescue Nico, suffer a terrible accident on the road. Fausto finds out that Olmo has Nico and goes for him. Marina is afraid that something bad will happen to her baby with the medicines she is taking. Julio prohibits Octavio from telling the police that Vera is in danger. Fausto arrives for Nico at Olmo's cabin. Edy is about to confess the truth to Fabi. Pedro manages to get to a hospital to save Vera's life.
69	"Corremos peligro estando juntos"	22 April 2021	2.9
Fausto arrives at the cabin for Nico and informs Olmo that Vera and Pedro survived the accident. Teo assures Alicia that Fausto doesn't suit her. Nico communicates to his mother the message that Olmo gave him. Vera assures Pedro that Nico is in danger and believes that the best place to take shelter is Fausto's house, Pedro refuses to accept the proposal and Vera tells him that the best thing is to separate. Olmo finds out that Marina is pregnant. Now that Fausto has Vera in his hands, he is already preparing a plan against her. Jacinto looks for Emilia and Edy and asks them to go live at his father's house. Lola has a confrontation with Regina, Bernardo's daughter. Fausto and El Chamaco continue to launder money, but Jacinto makes a mistake and Teo takes advantage of the moment for proof. Gastón and Mélida become parents.
70	"Una guerra de trincheras"	23 April 2021	2.9
Teo shows Pedro the photographs that show Fausto laundering money, but he does not believe him, since he assures him that they are not very clear. Laiza finds out that Gastón is already a father and recovers her father's letter. Octavio confesses to Emilia that he is attracted to her, so he asks for a chance and they kiss. Ivana tells Olmo that she no longer wants to live in the hotel and proposes to buy a house, but he wants to get the Cáceres mansion back. Fausto prepares a trap for Vera. Vera finds a USB stick in Tadeo's house that contains information against Olmo. Pedro finds out that Marina is pregnant. Gastón tells Mélida that his father suggested that he enter the money laundering business, but he refuses to work in the circle of corruption. Laiza finds out that Olmo and Fausto killed Pedro's father. Edy confesses to Fabi that his grandfather killed Antonia. Vera arrives with Octavio and tells him that he has evidence to prove that Olmo Cáceres is her mother's murderer. Gastón informs his father that he agrees to enter the business that he proposed.
71	"A veces hasta en el fango hay flores"	26 April 2021	2.7
After Fabi and Octavio's statements, the judge grants Ivana parental authority over her daughter. Andrés seeks to surprise Marina with the baby's room, but she suffers a crisis. Octavio discovers that the video that proves that Olmo murdered Antonia is false. Vera, having the proof in her hands, assures Olmo that now she is going to put him in jail, but he mocks her by telling her that his video is a hoax. Laiza confirms to Vera that Fausto also murdered Pedro's father and assured her that Ramiro only gave Olmo's name since he made an agreement with Fausto. Pedro fights with Jacinto and warns him not to interfere with his family.
72	"Fausto asesinó a Antonia"	27 April 2021	3.1
Vera confesses to Pedro that Fausto also killed Tomás, so he takes the moment to tell her that Antonia's real murderer is Fausto. Vera upon hearing the news tries to escape, but Jacinto threatens them with a weapon. Edy confirms to Vera that Fausto murdered Antonia. Olmo, Ivana and Rodrigo are already preparing revenge against El Chamaco and Fausto. Alicia arrives at Teo's apartment and admits that she once again failed to choose a romantic partner. After learning the truth and at the foot of her grave, Vera asks her mother for forgiveness. Alicia is willing to become Pedro's ally to put Fausto in jail. Pedro confirms to Marina that her father is dedicated to laundering money. Fabi has an accident.
73	"Brindar por los muertos"	28 April 2021	2.9
Vera confesses to Lola that Fausto killed Antonia. Octavio arrives at the hotel to see how Fabi is, but Ivana runs him off. Jacinto assures Fausto that the only thing that matters to him is Vera, but he has forgotten that he is also his son. Alicia begins with the plan against Fausto. Faustpo knowing that Edy was a witness to Antonia's murder, decides to get him out of his way, but what he does not imagine is that Alicia hears his plan. Gastón confronts his father when he learns that he is a criminal, so he is determined to get out of business. Just as Olmo, Ivana and Rodrigo had planned, El Chamaco's helicopter was shot down and there were no survivors. However, Vera manages to save Fausto's life by telling him that she wants to see him at the mansion. Marina arrives at Olmo's office to confront him about the death of Pedro's father. Fausto assures Jacinto that Olmo tried to kill him.
74	"Son una familia de asesinos"	29 April 2021	3.1
Fausto informs Jacinto that Olmo wanted to kill him, so he asks him to take all the cash that is in the house and take it to the hotel and reiterates that everyone must think that he is dead, including Vera. During a business meeting, Fausto communicates with Olmo and assures him that he is behind the attack. Vera manages to get Jacinto to take her to where her father is hiding. Delia assures Olmo that during all the years she was working with him she believed he was a good man, but now that she discovered that he is a murderer she regrets calling him a friend and slaps him. Ivana proposes to Olmo that Delia and Laiza disappear. Fausto assures Vera that with Antonia's death he knew that she was going to be on his side and in this way he was going to be able to finish off Olmo Cáceres. Fabi manages to escape from the hotel with the help of Edy.
75	"La última jugada"	30 April 2021	2.9
Fausto decides to kidnap Vera upon discovering that she set him a trap, Julio tries to rescue her, but is shot. Gastón blames Olmo if something happens to Laiza or Delia. Olmo feels blackmailed by his son, but he will not allow himself to be defeated by him. Olmo murders Jacinto in cold blood and Alicia manages to leave the mansion and assures her grandson that she felt close to death. Gastón manages to save Laiza and Delia and assures them that nothing bad is going to happen to them. Silvio kidnaps Pedro and tries to kill him. Olmo gives Ivana the ring that belonged to Alma. Mélida, upon learning that Gastón wants to start a new life with Laiza, assures him that he will never see his son again. Fausto demands that Vera commit suicide or else Nico will pay the consequences.
76	"Lo más importante es la familia"	3 May 2021	3.8
Olmo prevents Fausto from shooting Marina, he manages to get her out of the way and he receives the bullet impact. Olmo dies after asking his children for forgiveness. Ivana kills Fausto. Ivana receives a letter from Fabi in prison, who tells her that she entered an excellent high school, but she shares that she would have liked her situation with her to be different. Mélida gives Gonzalo a folder disassociating Marina, Gastón and Pedro from all the Grupo Cáceres frauds. Teo hands Gonzalo an engagement ring. Lola is happy that Julio has found a great woman. Emilia accepts that she is willing to start a relationship with Octavio. Without fear of being separated again, Vera and Pedro begin their life as a family accompanied by their son Nico.
