= El club de los insomnes =

- Directed by: José Eduardo Giordano; Sergio Goyri Jr.
- Starring: Alejandra Ambrosi; Cassandra Ciangherotti; Leonardo Ortizgris
- Cinematography: Iván Vilchis Ibarra
- Edited by: Óscar Figueroa
- Music by: Sebastian Bell; Axel Ricco
- Distributed by: Corazón Films
- Release date: 15 June 2018 (Mexico)
- Country: Mexico
- Language: Spanish

El club de los insomnes or El refugio de los insomnes is a 2018 Mexican drama film directed and written by José Eduardo Giordano, and Sergio Goyri Jr. The film premiered on 15 June 2018, and stars Alejandra Ambrosi, Cassandra Ciangherotti, and Leonardo Ortizgris. The plot revolves around a friendship between a man suffering from insomnia, an aspiring photographer and a woman who is not sure about her pregnancy. They meet every night in a mini-mart. The film was available for streaming in worldwide on Netflix on 30 November 2018.

== Cast ==
- Alejandra Ambrosi as Estela
- Cassandra Ciangherotti as Danny
- Leonardo Ortizgris as Santiago
- Fernando Becerril as Gutiérrez
- Humberto Busto as Compañero
- Alexandra de la Mora as Andrea
- Mónica Dionne as Alejandra
- Fernando Luján as Hombre Lobo
- Marco Méndez as El Diablo
- Luis Rosales as Carlos
