= María Félix: La Doña =

2022 Mexican biographical drama television series

- Genre: Biographical
- Created by: Larissa Andrade
- Written by: Larissa Andrade; Alejandro Gerber; Tania Tinajero; Gabriela Rodríguez
- Directed by: Mafer Suárez
- Starring: Sandra Echeverría; Ximena Romo; Abril Vergara
- Composers: Manuel Vázquez Terry; Salvador Valenzuela; Iván Cortés; Paola Rosado
- Country of origin: Mexico
- Original language: Spanish
- No. of seasons: 1
- No. of episodes: 8

Production
- Executive producer: Carmen Armendáriz
- Producer: Abraham Quintero Botello
- Editors: Mauricio Espejel; Roberto Bolado
- Production company: TelevisaUnivision

Original release
- Network: Vix+
- Release: 21 July – 1 September 2022

María Félix: La Doña is a Mexican biographical streaming television series produced by Carmen Armendáriz for TelevisaUnivision. It premiered on the streaming service Vix+ on 21 July 2022 and ended on 1 September 2022. The series tells the story of Mexican actress and singer María Félix, based on reporting and testimony from those closest to Félix. It stars Sandra Echeverría, Ximena Romo and Abril Vergara, who all portray María Félix at different stages of her life.

== Cast ==
- Sandra Echeverría as María Félix
  - Ximena Romo as young María Félix
  - Abril Vergara as child María Félix
- Guillermo García Cantú
- Úrsula Pruneda
- Emiliano González
- Aída López
- Iker Madrid
- Markin López
- Claudio Lafarga
- Epy Vélez
- Ana Bertha Espín
- Helena Rojo
- Josh Gutiérrez
- Axel Ricco
- Juan Martín Jáuregui
- Eduardo Manzano
- Ramón Medina
- Enoc Leaño
- Ximena Ayala
- Mauricio Salas Elizondo
- Marius Biegai
- Luis Felipe Montoya
- David Caro Levy

== Production ==
=== Development ===
On 16 February 2022, the series was announced as one of the titles for TelevisaUnivision's streaming platform Vix+. Production of the series began on 14 March 2022.

== Episodes ==
No.	Title	Directed by	Written by	Original release date
1	"Una mujer con corazón de hombre"	Mafer Suárez	Larissa Andrade	21 July 2022
2	"Las dos caras de la belleza"	Mafer Suárez	Alejandro Gerber	21 July 2022
3	"La diosa que no se arrodilló"	Mafer Suárez	Tania Tinajero	28 July 2022
4	"La Doña"	Mafer Suárez	Gabriela Rodríguez	4 August 2022
5	"María bonita"	Mafer Suárez	Larissa Andrade	11 August 2022
6	"María Félix"	Mafer Suárez	Tania Tinajero	18 August 2022
7	"Amor y muerte"	Mafer Suárez	Zaría Abreu	25 August 2022
8	"La vida es corta"	Mafer Suárez	Larissa Andrade & Tania Tinajero	1 September 2022

== Reception ==
=== Awards and nominations ===
Year	Award	Category	Nominated	Result	Ref
2023	Produ Awards	Best Biographical Series	María Félix: La Doña	Nominated	
2023	Produ Awards	Best Directing - Biographical Series	Mafer Suárez	Won	
