= Gabriela Ortigoza =

Mexican writer and screenwriter

- Born: April 1, 1962 (age 62); Mexico City, Mexico
- Occupation(s): writer and screenwriter

Gabriela Ortigoza is a Mexican writer and screenwriter. She has made her career in television for Televisa (Mexico). Her telenovelas have been broadcast in different countries in Latin America, North America, Europe and Asia.

Her most successful soap operas are: Simplemente María (1989), María José (1995), Camila (1998), Niña amada mía (2003), Contra viento y marea (2005), La mujer del Vendaval (2012) and Sin tu mirada (2017).

== Filmography ==
=== Original ===
- Amor de papel (1993–1994)
- Baila conmigo (1992) with Susan Crowley
- Tres son peor que una (1992)

=== Adaptations ===
- El precio de amarte (2024) original of Inês Gomes
- La madrastra (2022) original of Arturo Moya Grau
- Sin tu mirada (2017–2018) original of Delia Fiallo
- Mi adorable maldición (2017) original of Julio Jimenez
- Second part of Hasta el fin del mundo (2014–2015) original of Enrique Estevanez
- Third part of Por siempre mi amor (2013–2014) original of Abel Santa Cruz and Eric Vonn
- La mujer del Vendaval (2012–2013) original of Camilo Hernández
- Ni contigo ni sin ti (2011) original of Cassiano Gabus Méndez
- Juro Que Te Amo (2008–2009) original of Liliana Abud
- Yo amo a Juan Querendón (2007) original of Felipe Salmanca and Dago García
- Second part of Contra viento y marea (2005) original of Manuel Muñoz Rico
- Apuesta por un amor (2004–2005) original of Bernardo Romero Pereiro
- Niña amada mía (2003) original of César Miguel Rondón
- Por un beso (2000–2001) original of Inés Rodena
- Por tu amor (1999) original of Caridad Bravo Adams
- Camila (1998) original of Inés Rodena
- Sin ti (1997–1998) original of Inés Rodena
- María José (1995) original of Inés Rodena
- Alcanzar una estrella (1990) original of Jesús Calzada
- Simplemente María (1989–1990) with Carlos Romero and Kary Fajer, original of Celia Alcántara

=== New versions rewritten by herself ===
- Simplemente María (2015–2016) remake de Simplemente María

=== Literary edits ===
- Second part of Agujetas de color de rosa (1994–1995) written by Susan Crowley
- Carrusel (1989–1990) written by Ley Quintana and Valeria Phillips
- Rosa salvaje (1987–1988) written by Carlos Romero

== Prizes and nominations ==
=== Premios TVyNovelas ===
Year	Category	Telenovela	Resulted
2008	TVyNovelas Award for Best Original Story or Adaptation	Yo amo a Juan Querendón	Nominated

=== TV Adicto Golden Awards ===
Year	Category	Telenovela	Resulted
2012	Best Character Design	Ni contigo ni sin ti	Won
