= List of Televisa original productions in 2020s =

The following is a list of telenovelas and series produced by Televisa in the 2020s.

== Years ==
No.	Title	Producer	Season	Original release				Network
No.	Title	Producer	Season	First aired	Viewers (millions)	Last aired	Viewers (millions)	Network
=== 2020 ===
1	Vencer el miedo	Rosy Ocampo	1 season, 47 episodes	20 January 2020	3.1	22 March 2020	3.8	Las Estrellas
2	Rubí	Carlos Bardasano	1 season, 26 episodes	21 January 2020	1.66	27 February 2020	1.99	Univision
3	Como tú no hay 2	Carlos Bardasano	1 season, 75 episodes	24 February 2020	4.1	5 June 2020	4.1	Las Estrellas
4	Te doy la vida	Lucero Suárez	1 season, 82 episodes	23 March 2020	3.3	12 July 2020	5.1	Las Estrellas
5	La mexicana y el güero	Nicandro Díaz González	1 season, 127 episodes	17 August 2020	3.3	7 February 2021	3.6	Las Estrellas
6	Imperio de mentiras	Giselle González	1 season, 92 episodes	14 September 2020	2.8	17 January 2021	3.3	Las Estrellas
7	Vencer el desamor	Rosy Ocampo	1 season, 93 episodes	12 October 2020	3.5	19 February 2021	4.0	Las Estrellas
8	Quererlo todo	Ignacio Sada Madero	1 season, 122 episodes	9 November 2020	3.2	25 April 2021	2.6	Las Estrellas
=== 2021 ===
9	Te acuerdas de mí	Carmen Armendáriz	1 season, 76 episodes	18 January 2021	3.2	3 May 2021	3.8	Las Estrellas
10	Fuego ardiente	Carlos Moreno	1 season, 85 episodes	8 February 2021	2.5	4 June 2021	3.1	Las Estrellas
11	¿Qué le pasa a mi familia?	Juan Osorio	1 season, 102 episodes	22 February 2021	3.0	11 July 2021	3.8	Las Estrellas
12	Diseñando tu amor	Pedro Ortiz de Pinedo	1 season, 120 episodes	26 April 2021	2.3	8 October 2021	3.2	Las Estrellas
13	Si nos dejan	Carlos Bardasano	1 season, 83 episodes	1 June 2021	1.62	11 October 2021	2.12	Univision
14	La desalmada	José Alberto Castro	1 season, 85 episodes	5 July 2021	3.0	29 October 2021	5.1	Las Estrellas
15	Vencer el pasado	Rosy Ocampo	1 season, 85 episodes	12 July 2021	3.3	5 November 2021	4.4	Las Estrellas
16	S.O.S me estoy enamorando	Lucero Suárez	1 season, 97 episodes	6 September 2021	2.5	16 January 2022	3.3	Las Estrellas
17	Contigo sí	Ignacio Sada	1 season, 120 episodes	11 October 2021	2.4	25 March 2022	2.8	Las Estrellas
18	Mi fortuna es amarte	Nicandro Díaz González	1 season, 92 episodes	8 November 2021	3.7	13 March 2022	5.2	Las Estrellas
=== 2022 ===
19	Amor dividido	Angelli Nesma Medina	1 season, 107 episodes	17 January 2022	3.1	12 June 2022	2.5	Las Estrellas
20	Los ricos también lloran	Carlos Bardasano	1 season, 60 episodes	21 February 2022	4.1	13 May 2022	3.7	Las Estrellas
21	El último rey	Juan Osorio	2 seasons, 30 episodes	14 March 2022	8.0 (s. 1) 2.7 (s. 2)	10 June 2022	2.5 (s. 1) 2.0 (s. 2)	Las Estrellas
22	Corazón guerrero	Salvador Mejía	1 season, 120 episodes	28 March 2022	2.2	9 September 2022	2.5	Las Estrellas
23	La herencia	Juan Osorio; Roy Nelson Rojas	1 season, 80 episodes	28 March 2022	3.1	15 July 2022	3.6	Las Estrellas
24	Mujer de nadie	Giselle González	1 season, 45 episodes	13 June 2022	3.0	12 August 2022	3.3	Las Estrellas
25	Vencer la ausencia	Rosy Ocampo	1 season, 80 episodes	18 July 2022	3.3	4 November 2022	3.6	Las Estrellas
26	La mujer del diablo	Carlos Bardasano	3 seasons, 26 episodes	21 July 2022	—N/a	6 January 2023	—N/a	Vix
27	María Félix: La Doña	Carmen Armendáriz	1 season, 8 episodes	21 July 2022	—N/a	1 September 2022	—N/a	Vix
28	The Stepmom	Carmen Armendáriz	1 season, 50 episodes	15 August 2022	3.1	21 October 2022	3.8	Las Estrellas
29	Mi secreto	Carlos Moreno	1 season, 120 episodes	12 September 2022	2.5	24 February 2023	3.3	Las Estrellas
30	Cabo	José Alberto Castro	1 season, 85 episodes	24 October 2022.	3.2	17 February 2023	4.7	Las Estrellas
31	Mi camino es amarte	Nicandro Díaz González	1 season, 92 episodes	7 November 2022	3.2	12 March 2023	4.0	Las Estrellas
32	Travesuras de la niña mala	Carlos Bardasano	1 season, 10 episodes	8 December 2022	—N/a	TBA	—N/a	Vix
=== 2023 ===
33	Perdona nuestros pecados	Lucero Suárez	1 season, 90 episodes	30 January 2023	2.6	2 June 2023	3.1	Las Estrellas
34	El amor invencible	Juan Osorio	1 season, 80 episodes	20 February 2023	3.9	9 June 2023	4.0	Las Estrellas
35	Eternamente amándonos	Silvia Cano	1 season, 120 episodes	27 February 2023	5.6	11 August 2023	5.5	Las Estrellas
36	Pienso en ti	Carlos Bardasano	1 season, 75 episodes	13 March 2023	3.2	23 June 2023	3.3	Las Estrellas
37	Más allá de ti	Rosy Ocampo	1 season, 8 episodes	26 May 2023	—N/a	26 May 2023	—N/a	Vix
38	Tierra de esperanza	José Alberto Castro	1 season, 60 episodes	12 June 2023	3.4	1 September 2023	3.6	Las Estrellas
39	Senda prohibida	Giselle González	3 seasons, 21 episodes	23 June 2023	—N/a	15 September 2023	—N/a	Vix
40	Vencer la culpa	Rosy Ocampo	1 season, 80 episodes	26 June 2023	2.8	13 October 2023	3.3	Las Estrellas
41	Gloria Trevi: Ellas soy yo	Carla Estrada	1 season, 50 episodes	11 August 2023	3.1	13 October 2023	2.8	Vix
42	Nadie como tú	Ignacio Sada Madero	1 season, 122 episodes	14 August 2023	5.2	28 January 2024	4.1	Las Estrellas
43	Minas de pasión	Pedro Ortiz de Pinedo	1 season, 107 episodes	21 August 2023	2.4	14 January 2024	3.2	Las Estrellas
44	Golpe de suerte	Nicandro Díaz González	1 season, 92 episodes	16 October 2023	3.1	18 February 2024	N/A	Las Estrellas
45	El gallo de oro	Patricio Wills; Carlos Bardasano	2 seasons, 20 episodes	20 October 2023	—N/a	12 January 2024	—N/a	Vix
46	La hora marcada	Patricio Wills; Carlos Bardasano	1 season, 9 episodes	27 October 2023	—N/a	27 October 2023	—N/a	Vix
47	El maleficio	José Alberto Castro	1 season, 82 episodes	13 November 2023	2.7	3 March 2024	3.0	Las Estrellas
48	Se llamaba Pedro Infante	Rubén Galindo	1 season, 8 episodes	1 December 2023	—N/a	1 December 2023	—N/a	Vix
=== 2024 ===
49	Tu vida es mi vida	Angelli Nesma Medina	1 season, 90 episodes	15 January 2024	2.6	17 May 2024	2.5	Las Estrellas
50	Vivir de amor	Salvador Mejía	1 season, 130 episodes	29 January 2024	4.5	26 July 2024	2.6	Las Estrellas
51	El amor no tiene receta	Juan Osorio	1 season, 95 episodes	19 February 2024	N/A	28 June 2024	3.18	Las Estrellas
52	Marea de pasiones	Giselle González	1 season, 65 episodes	4 March 2024	2.60	31 May 2024	2.87	Las Estrellas
53	El extraño retorno de Diana Salazar	Patricio Wills; Carlos Bardasano	3 seasons, 24 episodes	17 May 2024	—N/a	11 April 2025	—N/a	Vix
54	La historia de Juana	Patricio Wills	1 season, 65 episodes	3 June 2024	2.79	30 August 2024	3.03	Las Estrellas
55	Fugitivas, en busca de la libertad	Lucero Suárez	1 season, 80 episodes	1 July 2024	3.22	18 October 2024	3.11	Las Estrellas
56	Mi amor sin tiempo	Carlos Moreno	1 season, 80 episodes	15 July 2024	2.14	1 November 2024	2.18	Las Estrellas
57	El ángel de Aurora	Roy Rojas	1 season, 136 episodes	29 July 2024	N/A	2 February 2025	3.75	Las Estrellas
58	Juegos interrumpidos	Carlos Moreno	2 seasons, 20 episodes	30 August 2024	—N/a	2 May 2025	—N/a	Vix
59	El precio de amarte	Carmen Armendáriz	1 season, 50 episodes	2 September 2024	2.48	8 November 2024	2.26	Las Estrellas
60	Papás por conveniencia (Note: Also known as Papás por siempre for the second season.)	Rosy Ocampo	2 seasons, 162 episodes	21 October 2024	2.74 (s. 1) 4.81 (s. 2)	1 February 2026	5.61 (s. 1) 3.61 (s. 2)	Las Estrellas
61	Amor amargo	Pedro Ortiz de Pinedo	1 season, 82 episodes	4 November 2024	2.27	23 February 2025	4.08	Las Estrellas
62	Las hijas de la señora García	José Alberto Castro	1 season, 82 episodes	11 November 2024	2.09	2 March 2025	6.74	Las Estrellas
=== 2025 ===
63	A.mar, donde el amor teje sus redes	Ignacio Sada Madero	1 season, 90 episodes	10 February 2025	5.19	13 June 2025	5.07	Las Estrellas
64	Me atrevo a amarte	Salvador Mejía	1 season, 87 episodes	24 February 2025	4.68	22 June 2025	4.36	Las Estrellas
65	Juegos de amor y poder	Carlos Bardasano	1 season, 70 episodes	17 March 2025	4.32 (Mex.)	30 June 2025	5.24 (Mex.)	Univision
66	Con esa misma mirada	Patricia Benítez; Fides Velasco	3 seasons, 24 episodes	21 March 2025	—N/a	17 October 2025	—N/a	Vix
67	Monteverde	Lucero Suárez	1 season, 87 episodes	16 June 2025	5.01	12 October 2025	4.47	Las Estrellas
68	Regalo de amor	Silvia Cano	1 season, 100 episodes	23 June 2025	3.39	7 November 2025	5.46	Las Estrellas
69	Amanecer	Juan Osorio	1 season, 80 episodes	7 July 2025	4.92	24 October 2025	4.54	Las Estrellas
70	Los hilos del pasado	José Alberto Castro	1 season, 60 episodes	10 September 2025	4.58 (Mex.)	5 December 2025	4.71 (Mex.)	Univision
71	Contrato de corazones, tú y yo	Carlos Murguía; Eduardo Murguía	1 season, 20 episodes	27 October 2025	1.25 (s. 1)	TBA	1.17 (s. 1)	Canal 5
72	Mi verdad oculta	Carlos Moreno	1 season, 82 episodes	10 November 2025	4.09	1 March 2026	4.14	Las Estrellas
73	Doménica Montero	Carlos Bardasano	1 season, 50 episodes	8 December 2025	4.77 (Mex.)	17 February 2026	5.20 (Mex.)	Univision
=== 2026 ===
74	Hermanas, un amor compartido	Silvia Cano	1 season, 80 episodes	2 February 2026	4.41	22 May 2026	4.48	Las Estrellas
75	Corazón de oro	Pedro Ortiz de Pinedo	1 season, 80 episodes	2 March 2026	3.91	19 June 2026	3.92	Las Estrellas
76	Mi rival	Carmen Armendáriz	1 season, 52 episodes	2 March 2026	4.53 (Mex.)	14 May 2026	3.08 (Mex.)	Univision
77	Polen	Juancho Cardona; Manolo Cardona	1 season, 10 episodes	6 March 2026	—N/a	6 March 2026	—N/a	Vix
78	Los encantos del sinvergüenza	Patricio Wills; Manolo Cardona	1 season, 20 episodes	24 April 2026	—N/a	1 May 2026	—N/a	Vix
79	Guardián de mi vida	Juan Osorio	1 season, 77 episodes	18 May 2026	3.53 (Mex.)	2 September 2026	3.89 (Mex.)	Univision
80	Tan cerca de ti, nace el amor	Ignacio Sada Madero	1 season, 85 episodes	25 May 2026	4.23	18 September 2026	4.73	Las Estrellas
81	El precio de la fama	Iván Aranda	1 season, 8 episodes	29 May 2026	—N/a	29 May 2026	—N/a	Vix
82	El renacer de Luna	Roy Rojas	1 season, 80 episodes	22 June 2026	3.65	9 October 2026	3.87	Las Estrellas
83	Una familia complicada	Carmen Armendáriz	1 season, 20 episodes	26 June 2026	—N/a	26 June 2026	—N/a	Vix
84	Un paso hacia ti	Luis Lusillo	1 season, 20 episodes	27 July 2026	0.54	21 August 2026	0.69	Canal 5
85	Tierra de amor y coraje	José Alberto Castro	1 season, 77 episodes	7 August 2026	4.21 (Mex.)	20 November 2026	TBD	Vix
86	La pícara soñadora	Carlos Murguía; Eduardo Murguía	1 season, 21 episodes	24 August 2026	0.43	25 September 2026	0.41	Canal 5
87	Sabor a ti	Lucero Suárez	TBD	21 September 2026	4.12	TBA	TBD	Las Estrellas
88	Cuando fui bonita	Pedro Ortiz de Pinedo	1 season, 20 episodes	28 September 2026	0.43	28 October 2026	0.44	Canal 5
89	Infinito amor	Salvador Mejía	TBD	12 October 2026	3.74	TBA	TBD	Las Estrellas
90	Yo no creo en los hombres	Abraham Mancilla; Héctor Sotelo Blancas	1 season, 11 episodes	30 October 2026	—N/a	30 October 2026	—N/a	Vix
Upcoming
TBD	Cruzando destinos: Marruecos en el corazón	Rosy Ocampo	TBD	18 January 2027	TBD	TBA	TBD	Las Estrellas
TBD	Te esperaba	Silvia Cano	TBD	1 February 2027	TBD	TBA	TBD	Las Estrellas
TBD	Luz de mis noches	Carlos Moreno	TBD	15 February 2027	TBD	TBA	TBD	Las Estrellas
TBD	Todavía te amo	Carlos Bardasano	TBD	TBA	TBD	TBA	TBD	Las Estrellas
