= Juan Martín Jáuregui =

Argentine actor

Juan Martín Jáuregui Bertolami (born 6 June 1979 in Mar del Plata, Argentina) is an Argentine actor who has resided in Mexico City since 1999. He is known for his appearances in several telenovelas produced by Telemundo, Televisa and TV Azteca.

== Filmography ==
=== Film roles ===
Year	Title	Role	Notes
2010	180°	Gasparotto	
2011	El firulete	Javier	Short film
2014	The Perfect Dictatorship	Scandal reporter 2	Short film

=== Television roles ===
Year	Title	Role	Notes
2005	El amor no tiene precio	Cobra	
2010–2013	Lo que callamos las mujeres	Marcos Juan	Episode: "Después ya nada es igual" Episode: "La puerta"
2010	El octavo mandamiento	Javier	
2010	Decisiones extremas	Rodrigo	Episode: "Mamá cuida a mí novia"
2012	Historias de la virgen morena	Daniel	Capitulo: Huesped en el corazon
2012	Infames	Daniel Herrera	
2012	La Teniente	Bruno Santoscoy	Episode: "Fama"
2013	Prohibido amar	Marcos Roldán	
2014–2015	Los miserables	Evaristo Rodríguez	Series regular; 100 episodes
2016	Un día cualquiera	Manfredo Felipe Diego	Episode: "Extraterrestres" Episode: "Traición" Episode: "Problemas del sueño"
2016	Sin rastro de ti	Braulio Portes	Series regular; 16 episodes
2016–2017	La candidata	Hernán	Series regular; 47 episodes
2017	El Señor de los Cielos	Sebastián Almagro	Series regular (season 5); 43 episodes
2017–2018	Sin tu mirada	Ricardo	Series regular; 63 episodes
2019	Vecinos	Guillermo	Episode: "Cásate conmigo"
2019	Preso No. 1	Ricardo Montero	Series regular; 17 episodes
2019	La usurpadora	Gonzalo Santamaría	Guest star; 4 episodes
2020-21	Imperio de mentiras	Marcelo Arizmendi	Recurring role
2021	¿Qué le pasa a mi familia?	Iván García Altamirano	Recurring role
2021-22	SOS me estoy enamorando	Diego Miranda	Series regular
2022	La madrastra	Bruno Tejada	Series regular
2023	Eternamente amándonos	Ignacio Cordero	Series regular
2024	Fugitivas, en busca de la libertad	Ismael Domínguez "El Fiscal"	
2025	Regalo de amor	Mauricio Navarro Mercado	
2026	Hermanas, un amor compartido	Camilo	
