= Alejandra Robles Gil =

Mexican actress (born 1990)

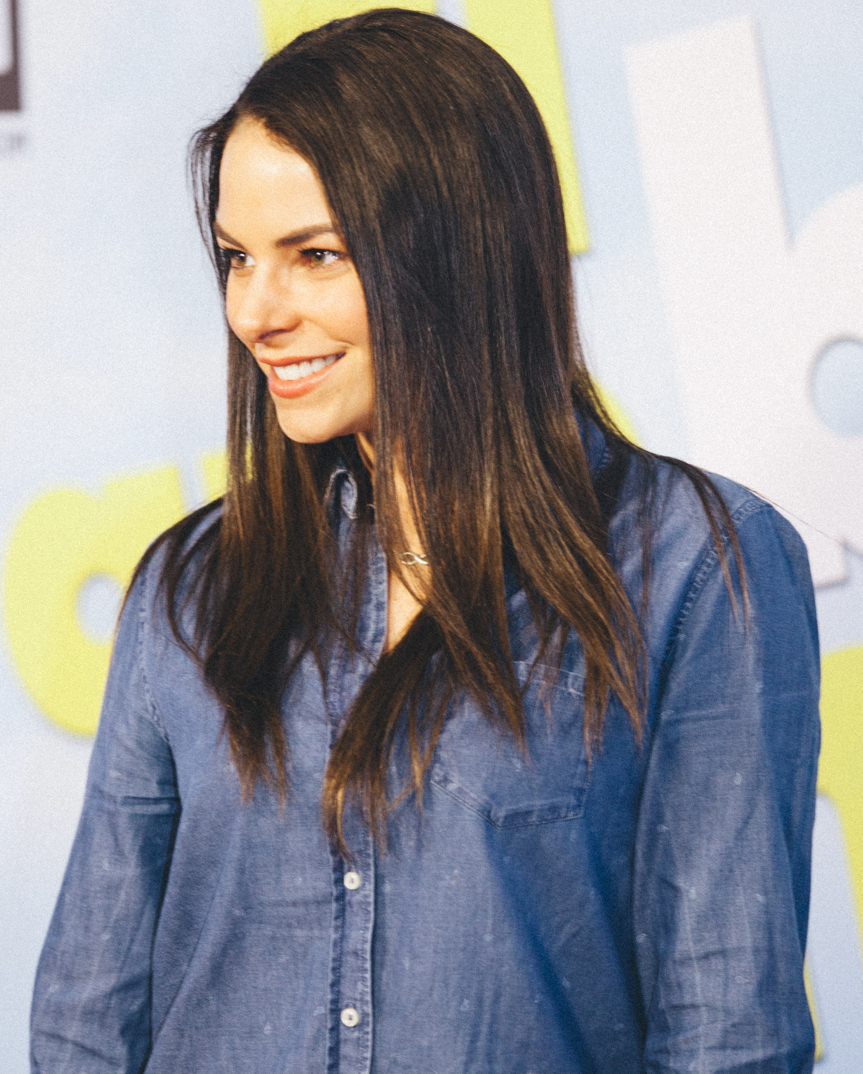
- Robles Gil in 2017
- Born: Alejandra Robles Gil Pérez; February 7, 1990 (age 36); Mexico City, Mexico
- Education: Centro de Educación Artística
- Occupation: Actress
- Years active: 2012–present
- Partner: Alejandro Domínguez
- Mother: Haydee Pérez

Alejandra Robles Gil Pérez (born February 7, 1990) is a Mexican actress.

== Biography ==
Alejandra Robles Gil was born in Mexico City and graduated from the Centro de Educación Artística (CEA). She began her television career in 2012 with the hit telenovela Porque el amor manda, where she played Alejandra, sharing credits with Blanca Soto and Fernando Colunga.

That same year she played Liz in the telenovela Wild at Heart, along with Ana Brenda Contreras and Daniel Arenas. In 2014, she played the evil Inés in The Stray Cat, alongside Maite Perroni and again with Daniel Arenas.

In 2015, Robles Gil played Teodora in the telenovela Que te perdone Dios, with Zuria Vega and Mark Tacher. That same year, she participated in the series Como dice el dicho, in the chapter "Quien pobre anocheció".

In 2016 she played Lucía Arenti in the telenovela Simplemente María, with Claudia Álvarez, José Ron, and Eleazar Gómez.

In August 2017, Robles Gil and her partner Alejandro Domínguez announced that they were having a baby named Thiago.

== Filmography ==
=== Film roles ===
Year	Title	Roles	Notes
2017	La hora de Salvador Romero	Natalia	

=== Television roles ===
Year	Title	Roles	Notes
2013	Porque el amor manda	Alejandra	Recurring role; 4 episodes
2013	Corazón indomable	Liz Falcón	Recurring role; 10 episodes
2014	La gata	Inés Olea Pérez	Recurring role; 76 episodes
2014–2015	Como dice el dicho	Rebeca Irene	Episode: "En boca del mentiroso" Episode: "Quien pobre anocheció"
2015	Que te perdone Dios	Teodora de Zarazúa	Recurring role; 62 episodes
2016	Simplemente María	Lucía Arenti Rivapalacio	Main cast (part 2); 126 episodes
2016	Por siempre Joan Sebastian	Andrea Figueroa	Recurring role; 18 episodes
2016	Sin rastro de ti	Érika Santillana	Recurring role; 16 episodes
2018	La jefa del campeón	Fabiola Bravo Méndez	Main cast; 63 episodes
2018–2019	Las Buchonas	Tábatha	Main role: 81 episodes
2019-2020	El Dragón: Return of a Warrior	Lucia Martínez de Garza	Guest role; 1 episodes
2020-2021	Imperio de mentiras	Maria José Cantú Robles	Main cast; 92 episodes
2021-2022	Contigo sí	Ángela Gutiérrez Hidalgo	Main role; 120 episodes
2023	Eternamente amándonos	Paula Bernal	Main role
2025	Regalo de amor	Isabella Fonseca	Main role
2025	Doménica Montero	Paula	Guest role

== Awards and recognition ==
Event	Category	Work	Result
2017 TVyNovelas Awards	Best Female Revelation	Sin rastro de ti	Nominated
