= Regalo de amor =

- Genre: Telenovela
- Based on: A Little Sunshine by Emre Kabakusak
- Developed by: Juan Pablo Balcázar; Cecilia Piñeiro; Rosana Curiel Defossé; Mariana Achcar
- Directed by: Silvia Tort; Rodrigo Cachero
- Starring: Alejandra Robles Gil; Chris Pazcal; Claudia Ramírez; Valentina Buzzurro; Diana Bracho
- Theme music composer: Carlos Rivera
- Opening theme: "¿Qué significa el amor?" by Carlos Rivera
- Composer: Álvaro Trespalacios
- Country of origin: Mexico
- Original language: Spanish
- No. of seasons: 1
- No. of episodes: 100

Production
- Executive producer: Silvia Cano
- Producer: Marco Cano
- Editors: Irving Rosas Jaimes; Rodrigo R. Lepe Fernández
- Production company: TelevisaUnivision

Original release
- Network: Las Estrellas
- Release: 23 June – 7 November 2025

Regalo de amor (English title: A Gift Called Love) is a Mexican telenovela produced by Silvia Cano for TelevisaUnivision. It is based on the 2022 Turkish series A Little Sunshine, created by Emre Kabakusak. The series stars Alejandra Robles Gil and Chris Pazcal. It aired on Las Estrellas from 23 June 2025 to 7 November 2025.

== Plot ==
Isabella is married to Mauricio, in what seems to be an almost perfect marriage, although she is unable to have children. Eugenio lives with his mother, Fausta, and his father, Gaspar, who has been in a coma for five years. Fedra, his sister, escaped from home without a trace, but Eugenio searches relentlessly until he finds her whereabouts. One night, Eugenio witnesses an argument between Fedra and Mauricio, Isabella's husband, who is an employee of his company "FM y Asociados". Mauricio starts his car at full speed, followed by Eugenio, and suffers a fatal accident. A little girl named Valentina was in the car with Mauricio, but was not seriously injured. Eugenio is unaware that the argument between Mauricio and his sister was because he wanted to take Valentina, who no one knows is their daughter, with his wife Isabella, who discovers his infidelity and that the girl is registered in her name.

This event changes everyone's life, especially Isabella's, who realizes that her life was not as perfect as she thought. When meeting with Eugenio to find out what benefits she is entitled to after Mauricio's death, Isabella discovers the numerous debts her husband owed. Impressed by her strength, Eugenio suggests to Fausta that they hire Isabella to organize the company's events, providing her with crucial financial support. This proximity inevitably leads them to fall in love. Eugenio and Isabella's relationship is threatened when he discovers that Valentina is his niece, but decides to keep the truth from her. When the secret finally comes out, the trust between them is shattered.

Isabella, unable to tolerate the lies, puts an end to the relationship and distances herself from Eugenio. However, their love for each other is stronger than any obstacle and they decide to resume their relationship. Together, they will fight against Fausta and Fedra for the custody of Valentina, which is granted to Fausta through bribes. Isabella and Eugenio marry to be close to Valentina. In addition to their personal problems, they will also face difficulties in the company with Úrsula, but mainly caused by Bárbara, who seeks revenge on Fausta for being responsible for her father's suicide after leaving him in bankruptcy.

== Cast ==
=== Main ===
- Alejandra Robles Gil as Isabella Fonseca
- Chris Pazcal as Eugenio de la Vega Mondragón
- Claudia Ramírez as Fausta Mondragón Villegas
- Valentina Buzzurro as Fedra de la Vega Mondragón
- Diana Bracho as Catalina Ortigoza de la Vega
- Almudena López as Valentina Navarro Fonseca
- Arcelia Ramírez as Emma Torres de Morales
- Alberto Estrella as Gáspar de la Vega Ortigoza
- Fernando Ciangherotti as Clemente Cruz Lara
- Montserrat Marañón as Amelia Castillo Ramos
- Pilar Ixquic Mata as Sabina Cortés García
- Bárbara Islas as Úrsula Castrejón Uribe
- Francisco Pizaña as Pablo Cruz Aguilar
- Natalia Madera as Miranda Morales Torres
- María Penella as Tomasa Rosales Guerrero
- Deicardi Díaz as Samuel Ramírez Hernández

=== Recurring and guest stars ===
- Juan Martín Jáuregui as Mauricio Navarro Mercado
- Marcia Coutiño as Dalia
- Fernanda Arozqueta as Elena
- Santiago Zenteno as Sergio
- Tere Ibarra
- Michelle Durán
- María Paula Gay as Katia
- Nacho Ortiz
- Mariana Lodoza as Maribel
- Bernardo Benítez
- Khiabet Peniche as Olga
- Larissa Mendizábal as Leonor
- Mane Macedo as Cristina
- Paloma Cedeño as Carito
- Miguel Loyo
- Dacia González
- José María Negri
- Ángel Zozaya
- Ángeles Balvanera
- Miranda Casado as Tania Espinoza Urbina
- Alex Carabias
- Santiago Carrillo as José Jorge "Coque" Sotelo Burgos
- Luciana Rosette
- Ximena Tello de Meneses
- Regina Peña as Olivia
- Val Quezada
- Santiago Olmedo
- Romina Barragán as Genoveva
- Fela Domínguez as Irene
- Mauricio Abularach as Lauro Romero Sánchez
- Edsa Ramírez as Sandra Amezcua Rubio
- Carmen Aub as Bárbara Santillán Galindo
- Luz María Jerez as Beatriz Galindo de Santillán
- Federico Espejo as Jerónimo Castrejón
- Hugo Catalán as Mario Duarte Herrejón
- Elizabeth Guindi as Kamala
- Thelma Madrigal as Ivana

== Production ==
On 12 September 2024, Silvia Cano announced Regalo de amor as her next production. On 3 October 2024, Alejandra Robles Gil and Chris Pazcal were announced in the lead roles. Throughout the rest of the month, Cano revealed cast and characters through her social media accounts. Filming of the telenovela began on 5 November 2024. In December 2024, Alberto Estrella joined the cast. In February 2025, Carmen Aub joined the cast. In March 2025, Thelma Madrigal joined the cast, returning to telenovelas after an almost 10-year absence. Filming of the telenovela ended in early April 2025.

== Episodes ==
No.	Title	Original release date	Mexico viewers (millions)
1	"Ese no es mi esposo"	23 June 2025 (Note: Premiered early online through Las Estrellas website on 20 June 2025.)	3.39
2	"Yo no sé ser mamá"	24 June 2025	4.13
3	"¿Esa hija es tuya?"	25 June 2025	3.86
4	"Lo mío es tuyo y lo tuyo es mío"	26 June 2025	3.79
5	"No quiero oír tu voz"	27 June 2025	3.49
6	"Me encanta para Eugenio"	30 June 2025	3.09
7	"No tienes perdón de Dios"	1 July 2025	4.09
8	"Fausta no puede saber"	2 July 2025	4.19
9	"La bendición de ser mamá"	3 July 2025	3.88
10	"Es una mujer peligrosa"	4 July 2025	3.83
11	"Tenemos que desalojar"	7 July 2025	3.68
12	"¿Quién te crees que eres?"	8 July 2025	4.16
13	"Eugenio no me está diciendo algo"	9 July 2025	3.68
14	"Piensa en Valentina"	10 July 2025	4.45
15	"Todo fue una mentira"	11 July 2025	3.31
16	"Robo de información sensible"	14 July 2025	3.59
17	"La salud es primero"	15 July 2025	3.14
18	"No estás sola"	16 July 2025	4.09
19	"Les presento a mi novio"	17 July 2025	3.93
20	"Eres la mujer perfecta"	18 July 2025	4.30
21	"De todos modos, la voy a perder"	21 July 2025	3.87
22	"¿Vas a abandonar a otra hija?"	22 July 2025	3.75
23	"Mi hijo se va a casar"	23 July 2025	3.62
24	"El amor cura cualquier herida"	24 July 2025	3.53
25	"¿Estás conmigo o contra mí?"	25 July 2025	3.07
26	"Necesito a mi mamá"	28 July 2025	3.21
27	"No me hagas vivir con ella"	29 July 2025	3.59
28	"Fedra nunca tuvo una madre"	30 July 2025	3.78
29	"No me voy a meter entre ustedes"	31 July 2025	4.00
30	"Soy una tonta"	1 August 2025	3.56
31	"Ya sé que eres la mamá de Valentina"	4 August 2025	3.56
32	"Quitarte a Valentina"	5 August 2025	3.66
33	"Le voy a quitar a Valentina"	6 August 2025	4.20
34	"Me arrebataron a mi hija"	7 August 2025	3.74
35	"Soy la víctima perfecta"	8 August 2025	3.60
36	"No fue cualquier error"	11 August 2025	3.40
37	"Los tres están juntos"	12 August 2025	3.84
38	"Recibimos una denuncia anónima"	13 August 2025	3.38
39	"No me pueden quitar a Valentina"	14 August 2025	3.63
40	"Es la luz de mis ojos"	15 August 2025	3.58
41	"La capacidad de ser mamá"	18 August 2025	4.58
42	"Se está cumpliendo mi sueño"	19 August 2025	4.02
43	"Ser tu mamá es un privilegio"	20 August 2025	3.90
44	"No habrá más nietos"	21 August 2025	3.98
45	"Se ha dictado sentencia"	22 August 2025	3.74
46	"Valentina es un daño colateral"	25 August 2025	3.77
47	"A nadie le importó Valentina"	26 August 2025	3.73
48	"Tuve que hacerlo a mi modo"	27 August 2025	4.36
49	"El insoportable dolor que estoy viviendo"	28 August 2025	4.02
50	"¡Ojalá le caigan todas las de la ley!"	29 August 2025	4.56
51	"Cuida a nuestra hija"	1 September 2025	3.89
52	"Una idea un tanto loca"	2 September 2025	4.37
53	"Lograste el paquete completo"	3 September 2025	4.01
54	"Me dan miedo mis pensamientos"	4 September 2025	4.40
55	"¿Por qué no me dijiste que estás embarazada?"	5 September 2025	3.84
56	"El amor verdadero triunfa"	8 September 2025	3.82
57	"No te han sabido valorar"	9 September 2025	4.15
58	"Vamos a trabajar juntas"	10 September 2025	3.84
59	"Ella me quiso matar"	11 September 2025	4.12
60	"Reconciliarme con mi pasado"	12 September 2025	3.88
61	"Tienen a su papá de vuelta"	15 September 2025	N/A
62	"No me siento capaz de ser mamá"	16 September 2025	4.38
63	"Recuperar el tiempo perdido"	17 September 2025	3.86
64	"¡Sé honesta conmigo!"	18 September 2025	4.16
65	"¡Con Eugenio no te metas!"	19 September 2025	3.88
66	"Mi desgracia fue haberme enamorado"	22 September 2025	3.60
67	"Yo le creo a Fedra"	23 September 2025	3.79
68	"Te voy a destruir, Fausta"	24 September 2025	3.00
69	"Soy un caso perdido"	25 September 2025	4.43
70	"¿Beneficiarte lastimando a otros?"	26 September 2025	4.00
71	"Todos me abandonaron"	29 September 2025	4.00
72	"Hasta nunca, Fedra"	30 September 2025	4.11
73	"El funeral de Fedra"	1 October 2025	4.17
74	"La nueva Fedra"	2 October 2025	4.44
75	"¡Con mi hija no!"	3 October 2025	4.30
76	"Beatriz está en peligo"	6 October 2025	4.53
77	"Su palabra contra la mía"	7 October 2025	4.14
78	"Les queda poco tiempo con Valentina"	8 October 2025	3.91
79	"Mi familia se está desmoronando"	9 October 2025	4.35
80	"¡Mataste a tu mamá!"	10 October 2025	3.84
81	"No pueden salir"	13 October 2025	4.16
82	"Quiero el control absoluto"	14 October 2025	4.40
83	"Así quería verte, rogándome"	15 October 2025	3.93
84	"¿Quieres cancelar la boda?"	16 October 2025	4.82
85	"El sueño de toda mi vida"	17 October 2025	3.88
86	"No me importa el tiempo"	20 October 2025	3.98
87	"Sus historias no coinciden"	21 October 2025	3.78
88	"Eugenio no puede saberlo"	22 October 2025	3.98
89	"Te arruiné la vida"	23 October 2025	4.08
90	"Me vengaré por ti"	24 October 2025	3.92
91	"Eres una asesina"	27 October 2025	3.92
92	"Todos me mintieron"	28 October 2025	3.73
93	"¡Yo siempre ganó!"	29 October 2025	4.19
94	"Estoy embarazada"	30 October 2025	4.21
95	"¿Qué tienes en la cabeza?"	31 October 2025	4.12
96	"Llévatela lejos"	3 November 2025	4.72
97	"¡Tú ya eres mi hija!"	4 November 2025	4.49
98	"Ocho semanas de gestación"	5 November 2025	4.55
99	"Siempre te voy a cuidar"	6 November 2025	4.55
100	"Nací de tu corazón"	7 November 2025	5.46

== Reception ==
=== Ratings ===
Viewership and ratings per season of Regalo de amor
Season	Timeslot (CT)	Episodes	First aired		Last aired		Avg. viewers (millions)
Season	Timeslot (CT)	Episodes	Date	Viewers (millions)	Date	Viewers (millions)	Avg. viewers (millions)
1	Mon–Fri 6:30 p.m.	99	16 June 2025	3.39	7 November 2025	5.46	3.95

=== Awards and nominations ===
Year	Award	Category	Nominated	Result	Ref
2026	Produ Awards	Best Family Telenovela	Regalo de amor	Pending	
2026	Produ Awards	Best Lead Actress - Family Telenovela	Alejandra Robles Gil	Pending	
2026	Produ Awards	Best Lead Actor - Family Telenovela	Chris Pazcal	Pending	
2026	Produ Awards	Best Supporting Actress - Family Telenovela	Claudia Ramírez	Pending	
2026	Produ Awards	Best Supporting Actress - Family Telenovela	Valentina Buzzurro	Pending	
2026	Produ Awards	Best Supporting Actor - Family Telenovela	Francisco Pizaña	Pending	
