= Sin rastro de ti =

Mexican telenovela

- Genre: Telenovela
- Written by: Rosana Curiel; Luis Gamboa
- Screenplay by: Karen Villalpando
- Story by: Carlos Quintanilla Sakar; Adriana Pelusi
- Creative director: Jimena Galeotti
- Starring: Adriana Louvier; Danilo Carrera; Ana Layevska
- Theme music composer: Carlos Rivera
- Opening theme: "Que lo nuestro se quede nuestro" performed by Carlos Rivera
- Country of origin: Mexico
- Original language: Spanish
- No. of seasons: 1
- No. of episodes: 16

Production
- Executive producer: Silvia Cano
- Producer: Omar Blanco
- Cinematography: Ximena Amann; Walter Doehner; Luis Rodríguez; Diego Tenorio
- Editor: Juan José Segundo

Original release
- Network: Blim
- Release: September 9, 2016

Sin rastro de ti is a Mexican telenovela produced by Silvia Cano for Televisa, based on an original story by Carlos Quintanilla Sakar and Adriana Pelusi. The series premiered on September 9, 2016, through the Televisa-owned Blim TV streaming platform.

The series stars Adriana Louvier as Julia, Danilo Carrera as Mauricio and Ana Layevska as Camila.

== Plot ==
The night before her wedding, Julia (Adriana Louvier), a young pediatrician with a bright future, disappears without a trace.

Five years later, in the middle of the road, a university student finds a woman dressed as a bride, alone and disoriented. The boy takes her to the nearest hospital. During the journey the woman reaches to say her name: Julia Borges.

Julia has no memory of what happened to her during these five years. She only has an image that she can not get out of her mind: a man she does not recognize and who promises to take care of her forever.

Mauricio (Danilo Carrera), Julia's fiancé, believing her dead, has moved on with his life. He is married and has a one year old son. His new wife: Camila (Ana Layevska), Julia's troublesome younger sister.

The only one who kept hoping to find Julia is Tomás (Juan Pablo Medina), her best friend and co-worker. Tomás has invested all his money, ruined his marriage and has been almost ruined by trying to discover her whereabouts. The reason? He's always been in love with her.

Julia tries to face this new reality, in which the man she loves is married to someone else and all her life projects collapsed. Meanwhile, looking for clues that reveal what happened to her during these lost years and who was responsible for her disappearance.

== Cast ==
=== Primary ===
- Adriana Louvier as Julia Borges / Lorena Mendoza
- Danilo Carrera as Mauricio Santillana
- Ana Layevska as Camila Borges

=== Secondary ===
- José Elías Moreno as Raúl Santillana
- Roberto Blandón as Ángel
- Fernando Ciangherotti as Doctor Miller
- Tiaré Scanda as Doctora Arias
- José Pablo Minor as Luis Lara
- Juan Pablo Medina as Tomás
- Juan Martin Jáuregui as Braulio Portes
- Alejandra Ambrosi as Brigitte
- Pablo Perroni as Julián Reynoso
- Alejandra Robles Gil as Érika Santillana
- Gema Garoa as Galina
- Mauricio Abularach as Marco
- Lalo Palacios as Pedro

== Episodes ==
No.	Title	Original release date	Television Air date
1	"El día de la boda"	September 9, 2016	October 31, 2016
The first few minutes of the episode begin 5 years after Julia disappears, while she has a car accident on her wedding day. 5 years ago recreates his history with Mauricio, with whom he was engaged to marry, in this, reappears his sister who betrays her kissing Mauricio. Mauricio after what happened with Camila decides to throw it of the house of Julia, nevertheless Julia decides to go by her and after getting in the car to look for its sister begins the history 5 years later (current age), where a young person in the middle of The night finds her and takes her to the hospital.
2	"Sin recuerdos"	September 9, 2016	November 1, 2016
Julia wakes up in the hospital without knowing where she is, and it happens. While Luis is arrested for being suspected suspect of his disappearance. Camila tries to prevent her from learning the truth about Mauricio. Julia leaves the hospital room looking for Mauricio, but finds him arguing with Tomás and finds out that his ex-boyfriend is married to his sister.
3	"¿Quién soy?"	September 9, 2016	November 2, 2016
Arias manages to enter the hospital room where Julia is and warns her that her life is in danger, but Julia does not recognize her. Julia tells Erika everything that has happened and tells her that she dreamed of an unknown man who called her Lorena and asked her to help Luis out of jail. Mauricio and Julia talk about everything that happened. Julia begins to remember everything that happened 6 years ago, when she met Mauricio for the first time and became engaged. Camila takes Julia to live at home with Mauricio and her son, but she feels uncomfortable seeing them together and decides to go and live with Tomás.
4	"Nada que perseguir"	September 9, 2016	November 3, 2016
5	"El secuestro"	September 9, 2016	November 4, 2016
6	"Como si nada"	September 9, 2016	November 7, 2016
7	"Confundida"	September 9, 2016	November 8, 2016
8	"El beso"	September 9, 2016	November 9, 2016
9	"¡Casados!"	September 9, 2016	November 10, 2016
10	"Justo a tiempo"	September 9, 2016	November 11, 2016
11	"El rescate"	September 9, 2016	November 14, 2016
12	"Tratamientos"	September 9, 2016	November 15, 2016
13	"La ubicación de Arias"	September 9, 2016	November 16, 2016
14	"Lejos de ti"	September 9, 2016	November 17, 2016
15	"Cumple tu palabra"	September 9, 2016	November 18, 2016
16	"Desenlace"	September 9, 2016	November 20, 2016

== Awards and nominations ==
Year	Award	Category	Nominated	Result
2017	35th TVyNovelas Awards	Best Telenovela of the Year	Silvia Cano	Nominated
2017	35th TVyNovelas Awards	Best Actress	Adriana Louvier	Nominated
2017	35th TVyNovelas Awards	Best Antagonist Actress	Ana Layevska	Nominated
2017	35th TVyNovelas Awards	Best Antagonist Actor	José Elías Moreno	Nominated
2017	35th TVyNovelas Awards	Best Co-lead Actor	Juan Pablo Medina	Nominated
2017	35th TVyNovelas Awards	Best Supporting Actor	Pablo Perroni	Nominated
2017	35th TVyNovelas Awards	Best Young Lead Actor	José Pablo Minor	Nominated
2017	35th TVyNovelas Awards	Best Female Revelation	Alejandra Robles Gil	Nominated
2017	35th TVyNovelas Awards	Best Male Revelation	Juan Martín Jáuregui	Nominated
2017	35th TVyNovelas Awards	Best Original Story or Adaptation	Sin rastro de ti	Nominated
2017	35th TVyNovelas Awards	Best Direction	Walter Doehner and Ana Lorena Pérez Ríos	Nominated
2017	35th TVyNovelas Awards	Best Direction of the Camaras	Walter Doehner and Luis Rodríguez	Nominated
2017	35th TVyNovelas Awards	Best Musical Theme	"Que lo nuestro se quede nuestro" (Carlos Rivera)	Nominated
