= Silvia Cano =

Mexican producer

- Born: 1975 (age 50–51); Mexico
- Occupation: Television producer
- Years active: 1995–present

Silvia Cano Castillo is a Mexican television producer. She is known for producing telenovelas for TelevisaUnivision.

== Career ==
Cano began her career in the mid-1990s at Televisa. In early 1995, she was Florinda Meza's production assistant during the filming of La dueña. Once again, at the end of 1996, Cano returned to work with Meza on the telenovela Alguna vez tendremos alas, this time as production manager. Months later, Cano would once again become production manager within Angelli Nesma Medina's team, working on the telenovelas Sin ti (1997–98), Camila (1998–99), and Por tu amor (1999).

In early 2000, Cano joined the production team of producers Roberto Gómez Fernández and Giselle González, with Locura de amor (2000) being her first telenovela as production coordinator. After Locura de amor, she returned to work with Gómez Fernández and González on the productions El juego de la vida (2001–02), Clap, el lugar de tus sueños (2003–04), and Alma de hierro (2008–09).

After a brief hiatus, Cano returned to work with Gómez Fernández in late 2013, when he split his production team with Giselle González, now as associate producer on the telenovela El color de la pasión (2014), followed by other productions as Gómez Fernández's right-hand woman, such as El hotel de los secretos (2016) and La jefa del campeón (2018). Between the second half of 2016 and 2017, while Roberto Gómez Fernández was temporarily assigned alongside José Alberto Castro as heads of content and fiction at Televisa, Cano had her chance to make her debut as executive producer with the series Sin rastro de ti (2016).

After Gómez Fernández left Televisa at the end of 2018, Cano was brought into Rosy Ocampo's production team in 2019, once again as associate producer on the first three installments of the Vencer franchise, including 'Vencer el miedo (2020), Vencer el desamor (2020–21), and Vencer el pasado (2021). In October 2022, Cano would return to work for the second time as a sole executive producer, assigned to produce the telenovela Eternamente amándonos (2023), the Mexican version of the Turkish television series İstanbullu Gelin (2017–19).

In September 2024, Cano began production on Regalo de amor, the Mexican version of the Turkish series A Little Sunshine. In August 2025, Cano began production on her third adaptation of a Turkish series, producing Hermanas, un amor compartido, the Mexican version of Foster Mother.

== Filmography ==
Year	Title	Notes	Ref.
1995	La dueña	Production assistant	
1997	Alguna vez tendremos alas	Production manager	
1997–98	Sin ti	Production manager	
1998	Camila	Production manager	
1999	Por tu amor	Production manager	
2000	Locura de amor	Production coordinator	
2001–02	El juego de la vida	Production coordinator	
2003–04	Clap, el lugar de tus sueños	Production coordinator	
2008–09	Alma de hierro	Production coordinator	
2014	El color de la pasión	Associate producer	
2016	El hotel de los secretos	Associate producer	
2016	Sin rastro de ti	Executive producer	
2018	La jefa del campeón	Associate producer	
2020	Vencer el miedo	Associate producer	
2020–21	Vencer el desamor	Associate producer	
2021	Vencer el pasado	Associate producer	
2023	Eternamente amándonos	Executive producer	
2025	Regalo de amor	Executive producer	
2026	Hermanas, un amor compartido	Executive producer	
2027	Te esperaba	Executive producer	
