= Hermanas, un amor compartido =

- Genre: Telenovela
- Based on: Foster Mother by Serdar Oğuz
- Developed by: Juan Pablo Balcázar; Rossana Curiel; Cecilia Piñeiro; Mariana Achcar
- Directed by: Silvia Tort; Rodrigo Cachero
- Starring: Adriana Louvier; Danna García; Osvaldo Benavides; Juan Martín Jáuregui
- Theme music composer: Carlos Rivera; José Luis Roma
- Opening theme: "Almas" by Carlos Rivera
- Composer: Álvaro Trespalacios
- Country of origin: Mexico
- Original language: Spanish
- No. of seasons: 1
- No. of episodes: 80

Production
- Executive producer: Silvia Cano
- Producer: Marco Cano
- Cinematography: Demián Barba; Argenis Salinas
- Editors: Irving Rosas Jaimes; Rodrigo René Lepe Fernández
- Camera setup: Multi-camera
- Production company: TelevisaUnivision

Original release
- Network: Las Estrellas
- Release: 2 February – 22 May 2026

Hermanas, un amor compartido (English: Sisters: A Shared Love) is a Mexican telenovela produced by Silvia Cano for TelevisaUnivision. It is based on the 2018 Turkish series Foster Mother, created by Serdar Oğuz. The series stars Danna García, Adriana Louvier, Osvaldo Benavides and Juan Martín Jáuregui. It aired on Las Estrellas from 2 February 2026 to 22 May 2026.

== Plot ==
Rebeca and Mónica Olmos are sisters with different personalities who, despite this, always lived united by love, until a mistake changed their lives forever. Aura was born from a one-night stand between Alonso Beristáin and Rebeca. He never knew about Rebeca's pregnancy, since he left to study abroad in Europe; but his father, Silverio, a violent man, did know, and threatened Rebeca with getting rid of the baby if it was born, because he would never allow his son to ruin his life with her. Rebeca accidentally runs over Francisca, Silverio's maid, and he uses this to falsely accuse Rebeca of killing her, paying to have her imprisoned without trial in order to keep her away from Alonso. When Aura is born, Rebeca gives her up to a children's home to prevent her from living in prison and growing up ashamed of her mother. However, Mónica decides to adopt her, sacrificing her own plans to get married, as her fiancé refuses to support her with the child. Rebeca, upon learning that Mónica has adopted Aura, asks her to raise her as if she were her own daughter and never tell her the truth about her origins.

However, years of imprisonment and remorse change Rebeca, and eighteen years later, after serving her sentence, she is released from prison with the sole purpose of getting Aura back, turning her sister's life upside down and starting a battle between the two of them. At the same time, Alonso tries to divorce Lía, as their relationship deteriorated due Lía's unhealthy jealousy of Azul, their seven-year-old daughter. Rebeca relies on Camilo Cué, nephew of Antonia, her mentor in prison. Ever since Camilo saw Rebeca years ago in prison, when he was doing charity work for the inmates, he was captivated by her and is now determined to make her fall in love with him.

Mónica starts working at the publishing house Azul Profundo, owned and directed by Alonso. They meet there and, unaware of the bond that unites them through Aura, end up falling in love. When Rebeca finds out, she becomes enraged and rebukes her sister for being with the man who ruined her life. Everything becomes more complicated when Alonso finds out that Aura is his daughter and Lía sets out to make their lives miserable, losing her sanity more and more and allying herself with Silverio to get rid of Mónica and hurt Aura by any means possible. These circumstances, coupled with Rebeca's approach to Aura, making her believe that she is her aunt, make it increasingly difficult to sustain the big lie that the girl has been living and that threatens to fall apart at any moment.

== Cast ==
=== Main ===
- Adriana Louvier as Mónica Olmos Juárez
  - Dalexa Meneses as young Mónica
- Danna García as Rebeca Olmos Juárez
  - Romina Poza as young Rebeca
- Osvaldo Benavides as Alonso Beristáin Celorio
- Juan Martín Jáuregui as Camilo Cué Sampedro
- Luz María Jerez as Rosario Juárez Cienfuegos
- Juan Carlos Barreto as Delfino Olmos Reyes
- Eugenia Cauduro as Nadia Celorio de Beristáin
- Rossana Nájera as Lía Montalvo Fernández
- Zaide Silvia Gutiérrez as Concepción "Chonchita" Bringas de Correa
- Jesús Ochoa as Abelardo Correa Bojórquez
- Guillermo García Cantú as Silverio Beristáin Cuevas
- Diana Bracho as Antonia Cué Romano
  - Alejandra Ambrosi as young Antonia
- Margarita Magaña as Dolores Cancino de Olmos
- Daniel Gama as Patricio Beristáin Celorio
- Adriana Montes de Oca as Norma Gutiérrez Nájera
- Michelle Pellicer as Aura Olmos Juárez
- Ana Tena as Julia Olmos Cancino
- Tristán Maze as Germán Montalvo Fernández
- Sebastián Poza as Saúl Guajardo Fonseca
- Gema Garoa as Marcela Vázquez Espinosa
- Moisés Arizmendi as Pablo
- Mauricio Abularach as Oscar
- Paola Fernández as Eva
- Giovanna Romo as Karina
- Mavi Navarro as Argelia
- Nathalie Beltrán as Azul
- Alejandro Camacho as Leonel Montalvo Lizalde

=== Recurring and guest stars ===
- Silvia Lomelí
- Diego Bastida as Rodrigo
- Santiago Cachero
- Keira Juarez as Toni
- Hugo Aceves as Macario
- Isa Fernández as Alejandra
- Luis Enrique Duval as Benjamín
- Arath Aquino as Bryan
- Paco Luna as Kevin

== Production ==
On 31 July 2025, Adriana Louvier was announced to be starring in Silvia Cano's next production. On 13 August 2025, Danna García, Osvaldo Benavides and Juan Martín Jáuregui were announced in the lead roles. Filming of the telenovela began on 26 August 2025.

== Ratings ==
Viewership and ratings per season of Hermanas, un amor compartido
Season	Timeslot (CT)	Episodes	First aired		Last aired		Avg. viewers (millions)
Season	Timeslot (CT)	Episodes	Date	Viewers (millions)	Date	Viewers (millions)	Avg. viewers (millions)
1	Mon–Fri 8:30 p.m.	80	2 February 2026	4.41	22 May 2026	4.48	4.35

== Episodes ==
No.	Title	Original release date	Mexico viewers (millions)
1	"Voy a recuperar a mi hija"	2 February 2026 (Note: Premiered early online through Las Estrellas website on 30 January 2026.)	4.41
2	"Soy su madre"	3 February 2026	4.48
3	"No tienes hija"	4 February 2026	4.26
4	"Aura se va a enterar de la verdad"	5 February 2026	4.88
5	"Tuviste una hija con Rebeca"	6 February 2026	4.34
6	"Julia, di la verdad"	9 February 2026	4.58
7	"Mi hija vive aquí"	10 February 2026	4.63
8	"¿Cómo sabes que es mi mamá?"	11 February 2026	4.74
9	"Te presento a Aura"	12 February 2026	4.58
10	"Tienes otra nieta"	13 February 2026	3.88
11	"Es la novia de mi papá"	16 February 2026	4.33
12	"Me voy a ir muy lejos con Aura"	17 February 2026	4.48
13	"Aura es hija de Rebeca"	18 February 2026	4.38
14	"Soy su papá"	19 February 2026	4.51
15	"No me vas a alejar de mi hija"	20 February 2026	4.27
16	"Mi casa no es hotel"	23 February 2026	4.86
17	"Silverio descubre que Rebeca sigue en México"	24 February 2026	4.82
18	"Camilo jura venganza si tocan a Rebeca"	25 February 2026	4.29
19	"La próxima será tu hija"	26 February 2026	4.54
20	"Tu mamá soy yo"	27 February 2026	3.76
21	"¿Qué le hago a él?"	2 March 2026	4.69
22	"¿Tienes otra hija?"	3 March 2026	4.82
23	"Vi a Rebeca"	4 March 2026	4.38
24	"¿Quieres ser mi novia?"	5 March 2026	4.59
25	"Germán es mi novio"	6 March 2026	4.44
26	"El regreso que Rosario soñó"	9 March 2026	4.47
27	"El beso que despertó los celos"	10 March 2026	4.75
28	"Estoy de regreso"	11 March 2026	4.65
29	"Te vas a la cárcel"	12 March 2026	4.27
30	"Siempre estaré para ti"	13 March 2026	4.46
31	"No todas merecen ser madres"	16 March 2026	4.37
32	"Te amo"	17 March 2026	4.15
33	"Aura queda suspendida"	18 March 2026	4.65
34	"¿Por qué mandaste lastimar a Aura?"	19 March 2026	4.48
35	"Lía, queda usted detenida"	20 March 2026	4.26
36	"Te quedas en la cárcel"	23 March 2026	4.53
37	"Siempre me has fascinado"	24 March 2026	4.42
38	"Firmó el divorcio"	25 March 2026	4.48
39	"¡Rétame Julia!"	26 March 2026	4.43
40	"Alonso es tu padre"	27 March 2026	4.33
41	"No te voy a perdonar"	30 March 2026	4.32
42	"Estoy harta de ti"	31 March 2026	4.58
43	"Perdóname"	1 April 2026	4.63
44	"Nadie me quiere"	2 April 2026	4.24
45	"Estoy en depresión"	3 April 2026	3.39
46	"¿Dónde está Aura?"	6 April 2026	4.35
47	"Jugando al papá y la mamá"	7 April 2026	4.47
48	"El corazón tarda en sanar"	8 April 2026	4.68
49	"Aura está muerta"	9 April 2026	4.09
50	"El dinero también compra silencios"	10 April 2026	4.29
51	"No quiero ver a mi mamá"	13 April 2026	4.17
52	"Te quiero y me importas"	14 April 2026	4.35
53	"¿De verdad eres mi mamá?"	15 April 2026	4.26
54	"Tienes un geolocalizador"	16 April 2026	4.34
55	"Cásate conmigo"	17 April 2026	4.28
56	"¿Te metiste con la esposa de tu hijo?"	20 April 2026	4.28
57	"Me das vergüenza"	21 April 2026	4.15
58	"Te admiro, Mónica"	22 April 2026	4.60
59	"¿Qué haces con Lía?"	23 April 2026	4.36
60	"Me voy a ir"	24 April 2026	4.22
61	"Vine a recuperar a mi hija"	27 April 2026	3.78
62	"Yo mentí"	28 April 2026	4.40
63	"Los celos me están matando"	29 April 2026	4.05
64	"Acabaré con su secreto"	30 April 2026	3.73
65	"Tenemos que decirle toda la verdad"	1 May 2026	4.00
66	"El beso que lo cambia todo"	4 May 2026	4.42
67	"¡Estoy embarazada!"	5 May 2026	3.97
68	"Eres la peor madre del mundo"	6 May 2026	4.42
69	"Quiero que seas mi hija legalmente"	7 May 2026	4.08
70	"Aura y Silverio finalmente se conocen"	8 May 2026	4.17
71	"Necesito su ayuda, señora"	11 May 2026	4.33
72	"Lía mandó el pastel envenenado"	12 May 2026	4.30
73	"Aura es parte de la familia"	13 May 2026	3.90
74	"Sobrepasó todos los límites"	14 May 2026	3.82
75	"Tu verdadera madre es tu tía Rebeca"	15 May 2026	4.22
76	"Siempre vas a ser mi mamá"	18 May 2026	4.31
77	"Te amo como nunca amé a nadie"	19 May 2026	4.48
78	"Todo se derrumba para Lía"	20 May 2026	4.14
79	"¡Eres inocente!"	21 May 2026	4.03
80	"Brindo por mis dos mamás"	22 May 2026	4.48
