= Imperio de mentiras =

Mexican telenovela

- Genre: Telenovela
- Based on: Kara Para Aşk by Eylem Canbolat & Sema Ergenekon
- Written by: Leonardo Bechini; María Elena López
- Directed by: Walter Doehner; Juan Pablo Blanco
- Starring: Angelique Boyer; Andrés Palacios; Alejandro Camacho
- Opening theme: "Imperio"
- Composer: Jordi Bachbush
- Country of origin: Mexico
- Original language: Spanish
- No. of seasons: 1
- No. of episodes: 92

Production
- Executive producer: Giselle González
- Producer: Julieta de la O
- Production company: Televisa

Original release
- Network: Las Estrellas
- Release: 14 September 2020 – 17 January 2021

Imperio de mentiras (English: Empire of Lies) is a Mexican telenovela that aired on Las Estrellas from 14 September 2020 to 17 January 2021. The series is produced by Giselle González for Televisa. It is an adaptation of the Turkish series Kara Para Aşk, and it stars Angelique Boyer alongside Andrés Palacios. The production of the series began on 2 March 2020 in Mexico City, Mexico and concluded on 21 November 2020.

== Plot ==
Elisa Cantú (Angelique Boyer) never imagined that, upon returning to Mexico from New York, where she resides, she would encounter an unexpected tragedy that changes her life. The night Elisa would celebrate her birthday, fate leads her to meet Leonardo Velasco (Andrés Palacios), a policeman in love with Julia (Jessica Decote), a teacher, to whom he was to marry. At the end of the evening, Leonardo receives an emergency call, in which the discovery of two bodies is reported, one of them is that of his fiancée, who lies next to the body of Augusto Cantú (Enrique Singer), millionaire businessman and father of Elisa. Elisa and Leonardo will come together to search for the truth of what happened.

== Cast ==
The main cast of the series was confirmed on 27 February 2020 through the People en Español website.

- Angelique Boyer as Elisa Cantú
- Andrés Palacios as Leonardo Velasco
- Alejandro Camacho as Eugenio Serrano
- Leticia Calderón as Victoria Robles de Cantú
- Susana González as Renata Cantú
- Patricia Reyes Spindola as Sara Rodríguez
- Hernán Mendoza as José Luis Velasco
- Iván Arana as Darío Ramírez "La Cobra"
- Alejandra Robles Gil as María José "Majo" Cantú
- Javier Jattin as Fabricio Serrano
- Michelle González as Fernanda Navarro
- Juan Martín Jáuregui as Marcelo Arizmendi
- Luz Ramos as Adriana
- Ricardo Reynaud as Mario
- Cecilia Toussaint as Nieves
- Pilar Ixquic Mata as Teresa
- Carlos Aragón as Gilberto
- Verónica Langer as Piedad
- Cristina Michaus
- Adalberto Parra as Justino
- Alicia Jaziz as Clara
- Assira Abbate as Leslie
- Sandra Kai as Sonia
- Iliana Fox as Cristina

=== Special guest stars ===
- Enrique Singer as Augusto Cantú
- Jessica Decote as Julia

== Ratings ==
=== Mexico ratings ===
Viewership and ratings per season of Imperio de mentiras
Season	Timeslot (CT)	Episodes	First aired		Last aired		Avg. viewers (millions)
Season	Timeslot (CT)	Episodes	Date	Viewers (millions)	Date	Viewers (millions)	Avg. viewers (millions)
1	Mon–Fri 9:30pm	73 (Note: Should reflect the number of episodes that contribute to the average given in the last column.)	14 September 2020	2.8	17 January 2021	3.3	2.73

=== U.S. ratings ===
Viewership and ratings per season of Imperio de mentiras
Season	Timeslot (ET)	Episodes	First aired		Last aired		Avg. viewers (millions)
Season	Timeslot (ET)	Episodes	Date	Viewers (millions)	Date	Viewers (millions)	Avg. viewers (millions)
1	Mon–Fri 9:00pm	86	21 September 2020	1.56	7 February 2021	1.47	1.34

== Episodes ==
No.	Title	Mexico air date	U.S. air date	Mexico viewers (millions)	U.S. viewers (millions)
1	"Doble homicidio"	14 September 2020 (Note: Premiered early online through Las Estrellas website on 11 September 2020.)	21 September 2020	2.8	1.56
Augusto Cantú is proud of his daughter Elisa so he decides to give her a gallery so that she can display her works of art, including archaeological pieces. While Leonardo gets engaged to his girlfriend Julia, who announces that she is pregnant. Augusto and Julia appear dead in a vehicle. Darío threatens Elisa with killing her.
2	"Una niña bien convertida en ladrona"	15 September 2020	22 September 2020	2.2	1.57
Elisa asks Fernanda to tell her the truth about her father's illicit businesses. Leonardo discovers that Elisa could be involved in the trafficking of pre-Hispanic art and, furthermore, that Julia's death was a montage.
3	"La nueva directora del Grupo Cantú"	16 September 2020	23 September 2020	2.4	1.34
Elisa takes over the power of the company, but Renata demands her due; Victoria is a suspect in the death of Augusto Cantú.
4	"Estamos juntos en esto"	17 September 2020	24 September 2020	2.7	1.44
Elisa, upon seeing Leonardo, runs out of Julia's house so he chases her and assures her that he is not going to leave her alone, but it is necessary to take her to the police station in order to declare the truth. Darío locates Elisa and demands that she take some pieces of art abroad and if she refuses, she will never see her sister María José again. Victoria discovers Augusto's debts.
5	"Al enemigo hay que tenerlo cerca"	18 September 2020	25 September 2020	2.7	1.37
Elisa arrives in New York and assures Darío that she will not do any work for him, but he forces her to comply with the agreement. Leonardo informs Elisa that her father had an apartment and upon arrival they realize that it is there where he kept all the works of art that he trafficked. Victoria visits Nieves and Renata wants to sell her shares to Eugenio.
6	"Tenemos que conocer más uno del otro"	21 September 2020	28 September 2020	2.4	1.41
Leonardo and Elisa will pretend to be dating to be able to rescue María José, but Darío could discover the lie and take revenge on the Cantú family.
7	"Elisa presenta a Leonardo como su novio"	22 September 2020	29 September 2020	2.5	1.27
Elisa promises Darío that she will soon get the works of art so that he can set her sister María José free. Elisa takes Leonardo home to introduce him to the Cantú family as her boyfriend. Victoria is determined to send Renata to the psychiatric hospital to protect her from herself. Darío and María José have dinner together.
8	"Elisa se está enamorando de Leonardo"	23 September 2020	30 September 2020	2.7	1.10
After Sonia discovered Leonardo's lie, she confronts him, but he assures her that he also knows about the relationship she has with Marcelo. Elisa confesses to Fernanda that she has feelings for someone. María José tries to escape. Renata takes a pregnancy test.
9	"Elisa negocia la vida de María José"	24 September 2020	1 October 2020	2.6	1.31
After the kidnapper's call, Elisa looks for a way to get the million dollars they ask her to be able to rescue María José; however Leonardo lets her know that she is risking her sister's life. Darío finds out that he is being betrayed by his former employee and looks for a way to prevent Elisa from completing the plan.
10	"No sé qué hubiera hecho sin ti"	25 September 2020	2 October 2020	2.8	1.31
Elisa decides to report the kidnapping of her sister. Elisa kisses Leonardo in gratitude for his help. When Eugenio finds out what his niece Elisa did, he asks Darío to kill María José.
11	"Me enamoré de ti"	28 September 2020	5 October 2020	2.7	1.54
After Eugenio's order, Darío asks his workers to kill María José, but knowing that the life of the woman he loves is in danger, he runs to rescue her. Darío decides to take María José home to save her, but the hours are numbered, so the next day he lets her free, but she decides not to leave and they both confess their love. Nieves reproaches Leonardo for dating Elisa. Fernanda reveals to Eugenio the true identity of Leonardo.
12	"Quiero estar contigo para siempre"	29 September 2020	6 October 2020	2.7	1.36
María José is willing to fight against everyone in order to be with Darío, but he does not allow it since he knows that her life is in danger if they are found together. María José and Darío make love, but after the romantic moment, he decides to leave the house to confront Eugenio who has already given the order to kill Elisa's sister. Leonardo manages to rescue María José, but his brother José Luis is in danger.
13	"Cada día te necesito más"	30 September 2020	8 October 2020	3.2	1.35
Shortly before María José is released, Fernanda confesses to Victoria that her daughter is kidnapped and that Elisa's relationship with Leonardo is a farce. Elisa thanks Leonardo for helping save her sister and kisses him. María José rejects Elisa's affection.
14	"Lo que nos une es lo que nos separa"	1 October 2020	9 October 2020	2.8	1.19
Leonardo assures Elisa that she may be confusing the situation, since he still has the memory of Julia. Renata advises Elisa to fight for Leonardo's love, since what they feel is true love. María José defends Darío and escapes to see Piedad.
15	"No hay nada más que decir"	2 October 2020	12 October 2020	2.8	1.35
After seeing new evidence, Elisa and Leonardo confirm that Julia and Augusto were lovers. María José meets again with Darío and he assures her that they will soon be able to be together, but she questions him about the relationship that exists between Elisa and his gang to which he tells her that she helps them launder money. Fernanda discovers the relationship that Sonia and Marcelo have.
16	"Empezar de cero"	5 October 2020	13 October 2020	2.7	1.37
Leonardo confesses to Elisa that he can't stop thinking about her, so he asks her out. María José discovers that what Darío told her about Elisa is true. Elisa's life is in danger. Victoria rejects Eugenio's love. Fernanda sets a trap for Sonia.
17	"La verdadera identidad de Rosa Terán"	6 October 2020	14 October 2020	2.7	1.25
Darío kidnaps Elisa and asks her to deposit a million dollars, otherwise, now her mother could be deprived of her freedom. Darío receives a call from Rosa Terán's mother. Leonardo arrives at the restaurant where Elisa and Fabricio are. The police discover who Rosa Terán is and what relationship she had with Augusto Cantú.
18	"No puedo confiar en ti"	7 October 2020	15 October 2020	2.8	1.22
Adriana shows Leonardo some documents and confirms that Julia had a false identity, since she was posing as Rosa Terán, during the conversation, he learns that Elisa has Julia's diary. Nieves and Clara meet with Darío and beg him to give her the job Julia had, assuring him that she will be very discreet as was her sister. Leonardo complains to Elisa for having stolen Julia's diary and for having been dishonest. Eugenio tries to kiss Victoria.
19	"Vas a tener que matarme"	8 October 2020	16 October 2020	2.8	1.30
María José takes out all her anger and begins to hit Darío, but they end up indulging in passion. Fabricio confesses to Elisa that he came back alone for her. Fernanda fires Clara from the company. Darío looks for a way to be close to María José and brings her a bouquet of flowers to her house.
20	"Contigo a donde sea"	9 October 2020	19 October 2020	2.7	1.24
Elisa proposes to Leonardo to escape together, so he accepts and they have a romantic day. Renata realizes that María José's kidnapper was in the house, so she questions her, but María José begs her not to report him. Elisa realizes that Marcelo is arrested when he wants to sell one of the archaeological pieces. Eugenio discovers Sonia's infidelity and she falls into his trap.
21	"Chivo expiatorio"	12 October 2020	20 October 2020	2.8	1.30
Elisa does not believe that Marcelo is her father's murderer. Excited, Renata informs her sister that she is preparing a surprise dinner for Marcelo; however Elisa doesn't know how to break the bad news to her. Fabricio asks Leonardo that the police treat the issue with great discretion and warns him that he is willing to protect Elisa. Augusto takes revenge against Sonia.
22	"Un poquito de compasión"	13 October 2020	21 October 2020	2.9	1.31
Victoria informs Renata that Marcelo is detained, shocked, she enters a crisis. Leonardo visits Marcelo in prison and confesses that Sonia was the one who gave him the pre-Hispanic piece. Leonardo arrives at Elisa's office and tells her what Marcelo revealed to him.
23	"Fabricio intenta besar a Elisa"	14 October 2020	23 October 2020	2.7	1.08
Fabricio confesses to Elisa that he has always been in love with her. Leonardo confronts Eugenio to tell him where Sonia is.
24	"Quiero que me enseñes a amar"	15 October 2020	26 October 2020	2.6	1.36
Darío surprises Elisa at the office and assures her that he can control her life, so he orders her to travel to New York. Darío tells María José that since he met her his life changed. Victoria offers her support to Fabricio to conquer Elisa. Elisa is about to open her gallery, so she visits Leonardo to deliver his invitation, but not before reconciling.
25	"¡Renata está embarazada!"	16 October 2020	27 October 2020	2.7	1.36
Renata visits Marcelo in the prison and he confesses that the only woman he loves is Sonia. Victoria asks Leonardo not to get close to anyone in her family again, mainly Elisa. Renata faints and the doctor informs her that she is expecting a baby. Elisa opens the Cantú Gallery, but Darío arrives to threaten her.
26	"Quiero dormir contigo"	19 October 2020	28 October 2020	2.5	1.24
Fabricio presents Darío as an investor interested in participating in all the projects of the Cantú firm. Renata informs the family that she is pregnant. Elisa confesses to Leonardo that she wants to be with him, so they have their first romantic night.
27	"El amor todo lo cura"	20 October 2020	29 October 2020	2.7	1.33
After their romantic night, Elisa confesses to Leonardo that she had never felt so happy. Darío is hit by a bullet from the police who guard his mother's house. Elisa shares the identity of Cobra with Leonardo. Leonardo visits Sonia.
28	"Ese bebé no puede nacer"	21 October 2020	30 October 2020	2.7	1.20
Victoria asks Eugenio for help to stop Renata's pregnancy. Victoria and Renata argue and an accident occurs. María José confesses to Elisa that she loves Darío. Eugenio takes Darío's cell phone and pretends to be him to continue to fear Elisa and assures her that if she does not obey his orders, he will upload a video of her sister having sex to the internet.
29	"Mi propia hija me quiso matar"	22 October 2020	2 November 2020	2.8	1.39
Victoria assures that Renata wanted to push her down the stairs. Fabricio surprises Elisa by traveling with her to New York, but when speaking with Leonardo she lies to him and assures him that she is traveling alone. María José confronts Darío about the video he sent to Elisa, but he swears he didn't send the video. Leonardo confronts Elisa for hiding from him that she would travel with Fabricio.
30	"No tenemos otra alternativa"	23 October 2020	4 November 2020	2.7	1.31
Victoria believes that she has no alternative, so Eugenio helps her to interrupt Renata's pregnancy. María José visits Darío; Leonardo will take advantage of the situation to catch him. Darío assures María José that he regrets the damage he has caused her, so he is willing to walk away from her life.
31	"Enemigo en común"	26 October 2020	5 November 2020	2.7	1.32
Leonardo and Darío face off, but Darío manages to escape with María José after hitting Leonardo. Elisa asks her mother to stay out of her life. Renata finds out that she had an abortion. Eugenio sets a trap for Marcelo. Fernanda makes Elisa believe that Leonardo only uses her.
32	"¡Marcelo está muerto!"	27 October 2020	6 November 2020	2.7	1.19
Fernanda begins to put ideas to Elisa against Leonardo. Elisa discovers that it was her mother who authorized Renata to have an abortion. Leonardo finds out that Marcelo committed suicide, but he believes he was murdered. Eugenio takes Sonia out of the hospital. Leonardo informs Elisa that Marcelo took his own life.
33	"Te tuve que entregar"	28 October 2020	9 November 2020	2.4	1.21
Leonardo arrives at the hospital and realizes that Elisa is very well accompanied by Fabricio, so he gets jealous. Leonardo discovers that Tapia was the one who ordered to kill Marcelo. Eugenio sends his accomplice a gift for all his help. María José confesses to Renata that she fell in love with Darío, her kidnapper. Fabricio lets Victoria know that he is willing to follow through with her plan.
34	"No voy a descansar hasta verlo tras las rejas"	29 October 2020	10 November 2020	2.6	1.34
Elisa assures Fabricio that she is afraid that Leo will apply the law against her so he makes her a proposal. Leonardo arrives at Marcelo's funeral and assures Adriana that he will investigate Elisa's galleries, but when he sees Eugenio he confronts him and accuses him of being the author of all the crimes.
35	"Una puñalada por la espalda"	30 October 2020	11 November 2020	2.6	1.29
Elisa assures Leonardo that all he is causing is her getting away from him. Renata opens Elisa's eyes. José Luis attacks his family after learning that Leonardo will be his boss and kicks him out of the house. Darío surprises Victoria and introduces himself as María José's boyfriend, but not before threatening her if she plans to take any action against him.
36	"¡Elisa termina con Leonardo!"	2 November 2020	12 November 2020	2.2	1.22
Elisa confesses to Leonardo that she is tired of him doubting her family and her uncle Eugenio, so she decides to end their relationship. Darío threatens Victoria and asks her to become his ally. María José confirms to Elisa that Darío was the one who killed Marcelo.
37	"Dinero sucio"	3 November 2020	13 November 2020	2.4	1.19
Despite Elisa asking Leonardo for time, she looks for him to confirm that Darío killed Marcelo. María José, tired of Darío's abuse, decides to set a trap and threatens him. Teresa informs Leonardo of the 5 million pesos; he investigates and confronts José Luis.
38	"No supimos separar las cosas"	4 November 2020	16 November 2020	2.7	1.13
Elisa assures Leonardo that as long as the investigation exists, they will not be able to continue together. Victoria confronts Sonia. Fabricio arrives at Elisa's house as a surprise and decides to take her to the land where they plan the new construction and does not hesitate to steal a kiss from her.
39	"Fabricio intenta conquistar a Elisa"	5 November 2020	17 November 2020	2.4	1.30
Fabricio asks Elisa to give him a chance, but she doesn't accept him. María José decides to party with Clara and Leslie, but once they are in the club they realize that Victoria's daughter is taking drugs. Elisa comes to María José's rescue. Elisa arrives at Leonardo's house with Fabricio.
40	"A partir de ahora eres completamente libre"	6 November 2020	18 November 2020	2.5	1.31
Fabricio defends Elisa against Darío, but he assures her that they have pending accounts between them. Leonardo meets with Elisa and when she arrives, he lets her know that it is best to leave her free, since Fabricio does not separate from her. Renata discovers that Marcelo is dead.
41	"Quiero terminar con esto de una vez por todas"	9 November 2020	20 November 2020	2.3	1.20
Elisa is no longer afraid of Darío and confronts him. Eugenio proposes to Victoria. Leonardo asks Clara to help him do justice. Renata assures Elisa that Marcelo was murdered to silence him. Victoria arrives to look for Renata to admit her to the clinic.
42	"¿Trato o cárcel?"	10 November 2020	23 November 2020	2.4	1.19
Elisa offers Darío a pact to prevent both from ending up in prison. Leonardo arrives at Grupo Cantú to begin the investigation of the tax records of the galleries, so he asks Elisa not to take it personally.
43	"Ya no tengo nada que perder"	11 November 2020	24 November 2020	2.6	1.22
Elisa lets Leonardo know that she sacrificed the relationship just to find the truth to which he assures her that the investigation is not against her. Elisa, tired of Darío's manipulation, confesses to Adriana all the illicit businesses in which she is involved. José Luis and Leonardo face off again. María José is determined to see Darío in prison.
44	"Elisa exige ser la tutora de Renata"	12 November 2020	25 November 2020	2.7	1.10
Leonardo learns that the audit against Elisa's galleries was stopped. Elisa assures her mother that she can become Renata's tutor and asks Victoria to hand the responsibility to her before a notary. José Luis and Eugenio team up to finish off Leonardo.
45	"El siguiente paso es detener a Elisa"	13 November 2020	27 November 2020	2.8	1.15
Leonardo asks Elisa to help him discover the truth, but she believes that Leonardo just wants to destroy her. Commander Olvera informs Leonardo that Elisa is responsible for the money laundering and that she could soon go to jail. To get revenge on Eugenio, Darío confesses to Fabricio that they are half brothers.
46	"Clara y Majo se besan"	16 November 2020	30 November 2020	2.5	1.23
Clara arrives at María José's house to tell her what is happening to Leslie, but when she asks for advice from her friend, María José begins to have a special approach which ends in a kiss. Eugenio demands that Victoria formalize their relationship with her daughters. Leonardo informs Elisa that they are about to arrest her so he proposes to escape together.
47	"¡Quiero que me dejes en paz!"	17 November 2020	1 December 2020	2.8	1.10
Renata complains to Victoria for all the damage done and asks her to pretend that she no longer exists. Leonardo asks Elisa to escape so that she does not go to jail, but she refuses and confesses that she launders money on Darío's orders. Eugenio breaks up with Victoria. Fabricio arrives at his father's operations center and this is where Darío confirms Eugenio's illicit business. Fernanda reveals to Elisa that her mother is not dead.
48	"Te vas a quedar sola y en la cárcel"	18 November 2020	2 December 2020	2.6	1.37
Teresa is arrested for the murder of Reynaldo. Clara confesses that she loves María José. Fernanda apologizes to Elisa for having hidden the story of her mother and her son, but she discovers that her best friend is in a relationship with Fabricio. Renata, María José and Elisa confront their mother after discovering that she has a relationship with their uncle Eugenio, he reiterates that he loves Victoria and tells them that he wants to marry her.
49	"El cuento de la madre abnegada"	19 November 2020	3 December 2020	2.6	TBA
María José believes that her mother and Eugenio had a relationship since before her father's death, so she is opposed to their marriage. Renata confesses to María José that her mother has always hurt her because when she was a child she hid her so that guests would not see that her daughter had a problem. Eugenio threatens the nurse who took care of Renata in the psychiatric hospital. Fabricio discovers who his father really is.
50	"¡Leonardo atrapa a Cobra!"	20 November 2020	4 December 2020	2.7	1.27
Leonardo and Elisa are back together, but Darío surprises them as he comes to rob the gallery, so Leonardo confronts him and manages to stop him. Victoria agrees to marry Eugenio.
51	"Eres una asesina, mamá"	23 November 2020	7 December 2020	2.7	1.24
María José learns that Darío was arrested. Renata confronts her mother and calls her a murderer by assuring her that she is the culprit of her baby's death, since she gave the order to hurt her. Leonardo interrogates Darío and he confirms that Elisa is his accomplice.
52	"¿Asesinaste a Augusto Cantú?"	24 November 2020	8 December 2020	2.8	1.34
Darío provokes Leonardo and they fight. Fabricio looks for his father to confront him and thus know the truth; however Eugenio plays the victim. Clara reveals to María José that she can't stop thinking about her. Leonardo is suspended.
53	"Un acto de caridad"	25 November 2020	9 December 2020	3.1	1.38
Fabricio resigns from Grupo Cantú and at that moment Fernanda confesses that he is Juanito's father. Renata prepares a romantic dinner for Elisa and Leonardo. Victoria confronts Eugenio after learning that Darío is his son. Clara reveals her secret to Nieves.
54	"Quiero pasar el resto de mi vida contigo"	26 November 2020	11 December 2020	2.7	1.26
Leonardo gives Elisa a ring and they make an oath of love in which they make sure that they will always be there for each other, so they do not hesitate to be together again. Fabricio points out to Eugenio that everything he is and what he has, even his freedom, depends on his silence. Leonardo is reunited with Cristina, an old love.
55	"Orden de aprehensión"	27 November 2020	14 December 2020	2.7	1.40
Eugenio orders José Luis to make Darío's stay in prison hell. Darío pleads guilty, but accuses Elisa of being his accomplice. Leonardo tells Elisa that she must escape so that she does not step into jail, but when they leave her house they meet José Luis and Leonardo asks his brother to take Elisa to a safe place. Renata runs into her uncle Eugenio and questions him about what happened in the mental hospital.
56	"Me voy a entregar"	30 November 2020	15 December 2020	N/A	1.46
Leonardo informs Elisa that the authorities have already issued a search form against her, so she is determined to turn herself in to the authorities; however, Leonardo forbids it. Darío receives a warm welcome in prison. Elisa finds out that Fernanda was her father's lover.
57	"Eres una psicópata"	1 December 2020	16 December 2020	N/A	1.25
Mario informs Leonardo that Cristina suspects that he is protecting Elisa so he asks him to come to the audit so as not to raise suspicions. Leonardo confronts Cristina and she tells Leonardo that either he goes back with her or Elisa ends up behind bars. Leslie gets sick. María José visits Darío in prison. Cristina finds the place where Elisa is hiding.
58	"Vine a detener a una prófuga"	2 December 2020	17 December 2020	N/A	1.25
With lies, Cristina manages to enter Elisa's room and lets her know that she came to help her, but seeing her refusal, Cristina warns Elisa that if she does not leave Leonardo she could sink him and all his people. Leslie is diagnosed with leukemia. Renata and Victoria fight.
59	"Elisa Cantú, queda usted detenida"	3 December 2020	18 December 2020	N/A	1.34
José Luis arrives at the hospital with Elisa and José Luis assures her that as head of the Prosecutor's Office his duty is to report the presence of a fugitive. Elisa says goodbye to Leonardo and confesses to Renata and María José that Fernanda was their father's lover. Renata questions Sonia about her pregnancy. Clara and María José talk about their relationship.
60	"Encierran a Elisa en prisión"	4 December 2020	21 December 2020	2.6	1.30
Elisa is transferred to the prison and asks Leonardo not to get into trouble anymore because of her, so he promises to get her out of jail. Darío apologizes to María José for all the damage. Victoria suspects that Eugenio orchestrated the kidnapping of her daughters. Cristina arrives at Elisa's cell and makes her a proposal.
61	"Estoy dispuesta a declarar"	7 December 2020	22 December 2020	2.8	1.28
Cristina begins to pressure Elisa so that she can stay with Leonardo, but Elisa does not intend to fall for Cristina's game. Leonardo informs Renata that Elisa turned herself in to the police and she asks him to help her get out of jail. Sonia confesses to Leonardo everything about Eugenio; he takes her to the prosecution. Fabricio discovers that Juanito is his son and Fernanda will receive a surprise visit.
62	"Salud por tu libertad"	8 December 2020	23 December 2020	N/A	1.29
Cristina assures Elisa that she will help her get out of jail, as long as she stays away from Leonardo. Elisa doesn't want to see Leonardo. A commando attacks the police who were transferring Darío and they take him away. Sonia is once again under Eugenio's care. Fabricio prevents Darío from giving his statement to save Elisa.
63	"Vinculada a proceso"	9 December 2020	28 December 2020	N/A	TBA
After learning that Darío ran away, Elisa assures Fabricio that she is afraid that he will harm María José. The judge determines that Elisa should be brought to trial for the crimes of money laundering and art trafficking. Cristina extorts José Luis. María José meets with Darío.
64	"Darío y Leonardo pelean a muerte"	10 December 2020	29 December 2020	3.0	TBA
Renata discovers that Darío is the son of her uncle Eugenio. Adriana visits Elisa and assures her that Leonardo is defeated when he learns that the love of his life is in jail and asks her not to listen to what Cristina tells her. Victoria breaks up with Eugenio. José Luis asks Adriana to resign. Darío visits Piedad, but Leonardo arrives to stop him; they face each other and the gun goes off.
65	"La suerte está de nuestro lado"	11 December 2020	30 December 2020	2.7	TBA
Leonardo is injured, but is treated immediately. María José informs Elisa that Darío injured Leonardo during a struggle, when he tried to stop him. Darío thinks about fulfilling what he promised to María José and his mother. After being out of danger, Leonardo talks about love with Elisa. Leslie catches José Luis kissing Adriana. Fernanda discovers that she is a millionaire.
66	"¡Elisa está libre!"	14 December 2020	1 January 2021	2.7	1.20
Fabricio gets María José's signature. Fernanda informs Eugenio that it was Fabricio who helped Darío escape. Elisa is released from prison and is reunited with Leonardo.
67	"Las cartas sobre la mesa"	15 December 2020	4 January 2021	2.8	1.48
Cristina arrives at Elisa's house and threatens to denounce María José for being an accomplice of Darío. María José visits Darío in jail and announces that she is expecting a baby. Fabricio gives Fernanda more power and Victoria explodes when she finds out. Leonardo discovers who is Darío's father.
68	"Yo te voy a cuidar"	16 December 2020	5 January 2021	2.9	1.32
After learning that María José is pregnant, Elisa accepts Cristina's deal and separates from Leonardo to prevent her younger sister from being imprisoned. Teresa asks Adriana to leave José Luis and Leonardo demands the truth from Darío.
69	"Un reloj de arena"	17 December 2020	7 January 2021	N/A	TBA
Elisa and Leonardo put together the whole plan to make Cristina and Fabricio believe that they broke up. Eugenio tries to kill Fernanda. Eugenio threatens José Luis with saying that he was the murderer of Augusto Cantú and Julia.
70	"Proteger los bienes"	18 December 2020	8 January 2021	N/A	1.32
Eugenio demands that José Luis find Sonia, otherwise he could attempt against his daughter Leslie. Cristina asks Leonardo to be intimate with her, but he rejects her and assures her that she can never be like Elisa. José Luis manipulates Adriana to find out where Sonia is. Eugenio asks Victoria to sign a power of attorney to protect her assets. Elisa confronts Fernanda.
71	"Un corrupto asesino"	21 December 2020	11 January 2021	N/A	1.30
Mario tells Adriana that José Luis is Eugenio's accomplice; she doesn't believe him, but Sonia confirms it. Renata asks Mauricio to marry her. Eugenio threatens Darío. Leonardo decides to tell Elisa about all the harassment he experienced when he was with Cristina. Victoria confesses to Elisa that her father left a millionaire insurance for Fernanda.
72	"¡Sonia está en mi departamento!"	22 December 2020	12 January 2021	N/A	1.45
Renata believes that the studies she found in María José's bedroom are for the baby that is going to be delivered to her, so she has a crisis and attacks María José. Cristina discovers that Elisa and Leonardo lied to her. José Luis agrees to be Eugenio's accomplice. José Luis seduces Adriana and she reveals that Sonia is in her home.
73	"José Luis secuestra a Adriana"	23 December 2020	13 January 2021	N/A	1.42
José Luis confesses to Adriana what happened the night Julia and Augusto were killed. Leonardo informs José Luis that they have already started investigating him. Cristina confirms to Leonardo that his brother José Luis is to blame for all his problems. Darío asks Fabricio to kill Eugenio. Victoria already knows that María José is pregnant.
74	"Un último trabajo"	24 December 2020	14 January 2021	N/A	1.35
Eugenio asks José Luis to kill Darío, but he begs him for help to get him out of the country now that his daughter Leslie is torn between life and death. Eugenio and Cristina put together a new plan to avoid being arrested. Cristina asks Eugenio to give her Elisa. Sonia testifies against Eugenio and José Luis.
75	"El final de mi familia"	25 December 2020	15 January 2021	N/A	1.38
Sonia tells the whole truth about José Luis to Leonardo. Elisa believes that Leonardo is an accomplice in the crimes of his brother José Luis. Fernanda is arrested for art trafficking. José Luis discovers that the fortune he had kept in his house has been stolen.
76	"El arresto de Majo"	28 December 2020	18 January 2021	N/A	1.37
Leonardo tries to convince Elisa that José Luis cannot be her father's murderer, but Victoria takes advantage of the doubts to confuse her even more. José Luis knows that he is cornered and decides to flee, but the threat against his daughter makes him take another decision. Cristina finally manages to arrest María José. Fernanda could be released.
77	"Tú mataste a la madre de mi hijo"	29 December 2020	19 January 2021	N/A	1.56
José Luis accepts the deal that he is offered, in order to save Leslie, and pleads guilty to the murder of Julia and Augusto. Elisa and Leonardo's relationship ends permanently. María José is released from jail.
78	"Victoria planea desaparecer a Sonia"	30 December 2020	21 January 2021	N/A	1.44
María José decides to have an abortion, but at the last minute she regrets it and her pregnancy continues. Meanwhile, Renata, upset by the supposed abortion of María José, asks her mother to assure her that she will have her child. Desperate Victoria demands that Eugenio have Sonia's son at all costs. Leonardo discovers the whole truth about his brother José Luis.
79	"Ese maldito tiene que pagar"	31 December 2020	22 January 2021	N/A	1.22
María José finds out that Eugenio is Darío's father and tries to tell Elisa, but she reveals that she already knew. Therefore, María José realizes that Eugenio is responsible for everything and will try to prove it by asking Leonardo for help, but when seeking his help they are involved in an attack against him. Leslie finds out that her dad is in prison.
80	"Majo pierde al bebé"	1 January 2021	25 January 2021	N/A	1.53
After the shooting, María José is seriously injured and loses her baby. Eugenio will not rest until finishing with Leonardo. Darío, after learning what happened, swears to José Luis that he will take revenge.
81	"¿Y si yo maté a mi papá y a Julia?"	4 January 2021	26 January 2021	2.9	1.57
Renata confesses to Elisa that she believes she killed Augusto and Julia, since she has begun to have certain memories the night her father and Julia lost their lives. Victoria confirms to Renata that she didn't kill anyone. Sonia has contractions in prison. Victoria catches Eugenio with Cristina.
82	"Una bomba de tiempo"	5 January 2021	27 January 2021	2.8	1.63
María José finds out that she lost her baby and asks Leonardo to do justice against Eugenio, since he is the culprit of everything that happens to the Cantú family. Darío goes crazy when he learns that his baby died. Piedad confronts Victoria at the hospital. Eugenio offers Sonia a deal.
83	"Despojo"	6 January 2021	28 January 2021	3.0	1.55
Elisa finds out that Eugenio and Fabricio stripped her mother of her properties, so now she doesn't own anything. Victoria discovers that Eugenio had Augusto killed. Leonardo arrives at the hospital and has a beautiful gesture with Elisa.
84	"Somos aliados, nada más"	7 January 2021	29 January 2021	2.9	1.51
Elisa confirms to Leonardo that he was right about Eugenio's suspicions, so they both plan a trap against him. Elisa makes it clear to Leonardo that they will only team up to finish off Eugenio. Victoria asks Eugenio to marry as soon as possible. Elisa asks Fabricio to resign from the general management of Grupo Cantú.
85	"Eugenio es el padre del bebé de Sonia"	8 January 2021	29 January 2021	3.0	1.51
Eugenio finds out that Sonia's son is his, but Renata believes that something is wrong with the baby since she observes that her uncle's attitude has changed. Victoria confronts Cristina and confirms that Elisa and Leonardo are very much in love. Leslie gets sick in Acapulco.
86	"La muerte de Leslie"	11 January 2021	1 February 2021	2.9	1.54
Leslie fulfills her last wish and gets to see the sea with the help of her uncle Leonardo, Elisa and Carlos. Facing the sea, Leslie assures Leonardo and Elisa that she wants to become a star so that she can always take care of them. Leslie dies after saying goodbye to her father. Darío escapes from prison.
87	"Te voy a matar"	12 January 2021	2 February 2021	3.0	1.52
Leonardo informs Teresa that Leslie died and takes advantage of the moment to assure Elisa that he will fulfill the promise he made to his niece. Darío makes a call to Fabricio to confirm that he escaped from jail just to get revenge on him and Eugenio. Elisa finds out that Renata stole Sonia's son with the help of Victoria and Eugenio. Adriana arrests Fabricio for theft of an infant.
88	"Esta noche voy a ir por ti"	13 January 2021	3 February 2021	3.3	1.47
Elisa confesses to Leonardo that Eugenio took Sonia's baby and gave him to Renata. Victoria confronts Eugenio about the death of Augusto and he assures her that he did it just to save her. Darío tells María José that he will take her away, Elisa tries to stop him.
89	"Yo no maté ni a Julia ni a Augusto Cantú"	14 January 2021	4 February 2021	3.3	1.62
José Luis reveals to Sara that Augusto and Julia were already dead when he arrived at the scene. Eugenio and Victoria marry in a civil ceremony. Renata remembers when Eugenio abused her, so she decides to go home to confront him, but Victoria does not believe her and Renata assures her that she is guilty like her uncle. Cristina falls into Leonardo's trap and he seizes the moment to arrest her.
90	"¿Renata mató a Augusto Cantú?"	15 January 2021	5 February 2021	3.4	1.57
Eugenio in his defense assures Victoria that it was Renata who provoked him. Darío arrives at his father's house to threaten him and begin his revenge. Renata finds a gun in her bedroom and suffers as she remembers that she pointed the gun at her father.
91	"Darío muere en brazos de Majo"	17 January 2021	7 February 2021	3.3	1.47
92	"Voy a amarte toda la vida"	17 January 2021	7 February 2021	3.3	1.47
Renata confesses to Elisa and Leonardo that she killed her father, so she is willing to serve her sentence. Darío receives a bullet impact after struggling with Eugenio. Darío swears to María José to love her forever. Victoria confesses to being the murderer of Augusto and Julia. Six months later, Leonardo and Elisa get married.
