= Eternamente amándonos =

- Genre: Telenovela
- Based on: İstanbullu Gelin by Deniz Akçay Katiksiz
- Developed by: Rosana Curiel Defossé; Cecilia Piñeiro; Juan Pablo Balcázar
- Directed by: Silvia Tort; Rodrigo Cachero
- Starring: Diana Bracho; Marcus Ornellas; Alejandra Robles Gil
- Theme music composer: Carlos Rivera
- Opening theme: "Digan lo que digan" by Carlos Rivera
- Composers: Álvaro Trespalacios; Alfonso Matehuala
- Country of origin: Mexico
- Original language: Spanish
- No. of seasons: 1
- No. of episodes: 120

Production
- Executive producer: Silvia Cano
- Producer: Marco Cano
- Editors: Irving Rosas Jaimes; Israel Flores Ordaz
- Production company: TelevisaUnivision

Original release
- Network: Las Estrellas
- Release: 27 February – 11 August 2023

Eternamente amándonos (English title: Happily Ever After) is a Mexican telenovela that aired on Las Estrellas from 27 February 2023 to 11 August 2023. The series is produced by Silvia Cano. It is an adaptation of the Turkish series İstanbullu Gelin. It stars Diana Bracho, Marcus Ornellas and Alejandra Robles Gil.

== Plot ==
Paula Bernal and Rogelio Iturbide, two people with very different lives, instantly fall in love upon meeting and marry without letting Rogelio's family know, especially the matriarch of the family, Martina Rangel. When Paula arrives from Mexico City to the Iturbide's home, her lifestyle ideas clash with those of Martina, a manipulative woman accustomed to controlling her surroundings. Martina has sacrificed her happiness to follow the customs of Morelia society and, feeling threatened, declares a war on Paula.

== Cast ==
=== Main ===
- Diana Bracho as Martina Rangel
  - Eva Daniela as young Martina
- Marcus Ornellas as Rogelio Iturbide
- Alejandra Robles Gil as Paula Bernal
- Ana Bertha Espín as Irma Ruvalcaba
- Juan Martín Jáuregui as Ignacio Cordero
- Francisco Pizaña as Fernando Iturbide
- Alfredo Gatica as Fidel Fuentes
- Gema Garoa as Imelda Campos
- Arantza Ruiz as Cecilia Escutia
- David Caro Levy as Marco Iturbide
- Valentina Buzzurro as Blanca Ortiz
- Patricio José Campos as Luis Iturbide
- Dalilah Polanco as Eva Gómez
- Rossana Nájera as Érika Maldonado
- Elizabeth Guindi as Beatriz
- Claudia Rios as Micaela Cornejo
- Fermín Martínez as Honorio González
- Alejandra Ley as Felipa Contreras
- Santiago Zenteno as Melitón Pacheco
- Kaled Acab as Lucas Brown Maldonado
- Otto Sirgo as Gabriel Garibay
- Julia Urbini as Andrea
- Daniel Gama as Ulises

=== Recurring and guest stars ===
- Omar Fierro as Paco Medina
- Pablo Valentín as Óscar
- Pía Sanz as Patricia Aranda
- Erik Díaz as Ricardo
- Natalia Madera as Alejandra
- Arena Ibarra as Jimena
- Paco Luna
- Clarissa González as Jennifer
- Lesslie Apodaca as Tamara
- Hans Gaitán
- Germán Gutiérrez
- Daniel Vidal
- Juan Sahagún as Rubén
- Nubia Martí as Olimpia
- Fernanda Borches as Cassandra
- Diego de Erice as José Juan
- Montserrat Curis as Violeta

== Production ==
On 24 November 2022, Marcus Ornellas and Alejandra Robles Gil were announced in the lead roles. Filming began on 8 December 2022 and concluded in June 2023.

== Ratings ==
Season	Timeslot (CT)	Episodes	First aired		Last aired	
Season	Timeslot (CT)	Episodes	Date	Viewers (millions)	Date	Viewers (millions)
1	Mon–Fri 4:30 p.m.	120	27 February 2023	5.6	11 August 2023	5.5

== Episodes ==
No.	Title	Original release date
1	"No quiero dejar de verte nunca"	27 February 2023 (Note: Premiered early online through Las Estrellas website on 24 February 2023.)
Paula and Rogelio meet in a coffee shop. Martina is determined to find a partner for her son Rogelio. Imelda is interested in becoming part of the best family in Morelia. Martina suggests to Rogelio that it is time to marry, but asks that the woman he chooses be of good manners. Rogelio organizes a plan to be with Paula in Morelia, during dinner, he confesses that since he met her he has not stopped thinking about her, Óscar, when he sees Paula with another man, attacks Rogelio from behind.
2	"Les presento a mi esposa"	28 February 2023
Martina blames Paula for the attack on Rogelio and threatens her not to go near him again. Desperate not to spend another minute without her, Rogelio proposes to Paula. Rogelio and Paula attend the family dinner hoping that the news of their marriage will cheer Martina up, but she reacts in the worst way.
3	"Una guerra mundial"	1 March 2023
Martina warns Paula that she will get rid of her and reiterates her rejection of her for marrying Rogelio. Martina tries to fix the incident at dinner with Rogelio and names Imelda as her perfect daughter-in-law; she tells her that she will marry Fernando. Fernando proposes marriage to Imelda; at her response, Martina orders that Rogelio and Paula must also be married in a church. Óscar approaches Paula to kidnap her, Imelda sees them and believes that she is unfaithful to Rogelio.
4	"Hay que seguir reglas"	2 March 2023
Rogelio asks his mother to respect Paula, Martina assures him that they will not last long. Óscar manages to post bail and goes after Paula. Martina tells Paula about the bachelorette party she is organizing for Imelda, so she asks her to bring her a gift, Paula questions her about a suggestion and Martina mocks her for not knowing the family's traditions.
5	"Una boda trágica"	3 March 2023
Ignacio explains to his mother that they are close to achieving their revenge against the Iturbide family. Rogelio warns his mother that he is willing to move out of the house if he sees that Paula is not being treated correctly. Paula surprises Martina when she arrives at the church with a different wedding dress. Óscar interrupts the wedding with an attack in which Paula is injured.
6	"Esa mujer tiene un lado oscuro"	6 March 2023
Imelda is upset that her wedding was overshadowed by the attack on Paula. Martina wants to take revenge on her own. Luis tries to mediate the problems between Rogelio and Paula, but he cannot hide his admiration for Paula. Rogelio tells Paula that it was a mistake to rush their wedding since they did not get to know each other well, she asks him to trust her despite having hidden her problems with Óscar.
7	"Un convenio de divorcio"	7 March 2023
Fernando comments to Micaela that he is convinced that Imelda does not love him, since she is cold and distant. Seeing the problems between Rogelio and Paula, Martina warns Eva that she will destroy her and Cecilia if her son is hurt. Rogelio discovers that someone accompanied and paid Paula and Cecilia's bill, he worries about Paula's image in Morelia society. Paula decides to return to the city.
8	"Necesito que arreglemos esto juntos"	8 March 2023
Paula complains to Rogelio about the divorce settlement, he realizes that it is one of her mother's games to separate them. Martina is upset to see Paula at home, Rogelio reiterates his threat to leave if he continues to mistreat her. Martina learns that Paula went to a job interview and takes it as an offense. Rogelio fears that his wife is in danger.
9	"Empieza la guerra"	9 March 2023
Rogelio takes Paula to the country house to try to escape his mother's pressures, but Martina interferes by reminding him of his commitments. Irma arrives at Hipolito's ceremony and in front of his image, she swears revenge for the pain she caused her son by not recognizing him as an Iturbide. Rogelio warns Paula's boss not to go overboard with her. Paula's boss tries to create conflict by talking about Rogelio's reputation in Morelia. Erika, Rogelio's ex-girlfriend, sees him on the street while he waits for Paula.
10	"¡Voy a ser mamá!"	10 March 2023
Martina spies on Imelda and overhears her conversation about her estrangement with Fernando and her hidden love for Rogelio. Paula goes to the pharmacy alone, Rogelio arrives home and worries about not hearing from her. Paula buys a pregnancy test. Martina pressures Imelda to get pregnant because she refuses to have her first grandchild by Paula and Rogelio.
11	"Si quiere guerra, guerra tendrá"	13 March 2023
Cecilia inadvertently confesses to Ignacio about Paula's pregnancy; he conspires against her to cause a rift between their friendship. Paula confirms to Rogelio that they will be parents. Paula ignores Martina's indications and declares war on her. Fernando takes Imelda by force in bed.
12	"Hierba mala nunca muere"	14 March 2023
The doctor warns the Iturbide brothers that a similar fainting spell could be fatal for Martina and that they should spare her any displeasures. Imelda makes evident the hatred she feels for Paula. Paula tells Eva that she is to blame for Martina's fainting, Felipa and Imelda hear the confession. Paula apologizes to Martina for the argument, Martina confesses that she is faking her illness to reaffirm the power she has over her children. Fernando tells Rogelio that Paula is to blame for the fact that Martina was about to die.
13	"Queda usted detenido"	15 March 2023
Felipa warns Martina that Beatriz was seen leaving Irma's house and thinks she is setting her up. Erika accepts that she is jealous of Rogelio's wife. Eva goes for a walk with Luis and sees someone from her past. Martina learns that Marco got a tattoo. While Paula puts away her guitar, she finds a gun hidden among Rogelio's belongings. Ignacio suffers an attack in his car and blames Rogelio, so he is apprehended.
14	"No es un enemigo fácil"	16 March 2023
With Rogelio's arrest, Cecilia has doubts about Ignacio's intentions, but he manages to get her on his side. While Rogelio tries to arrange a romantic outing with Paula, he is ignored by her who also has to deal with the plans she made with Cecilia. Martina visits Irma to warn her not to mess her sons. Paula asks Erika to record the song she plays with Ale, when she finishes she faints in her arms.
15	"Intenciones ocultas"	17 March 2023
Rogelio discovers that Ignacio is actually Cristobal Ruvalcaba and confronts him about his intentions with the Iturbide family business. Paula's boss comes on to her to help her grow in school, but she puts a stop to it and resigns. Rogelio complains to Fernando for trying to withdraw a large amount of money from the company, the argument escalates until Martina is forced to intervene.
16	"Todo puede cambiar en un instante"	20 March 2023
Martina gives her grandson the crib used by all her children. Ignacio offers Fernando a partnership in one of his illicit businesses. Erika explains to her friend Patricia that the reason she came back was so that Lucas would stay with Rogelio if she were to be absent. Imelda burns down the Iturbide's crib, Martina is devastated.
17	"Tiene que saber que estoy aquí"	21 March 2023
Rogelio considers that the best thing for his marriage is to move out of his mother's house to avoid confrontations with Paula. Martina finds Eva at the jewelry store and confronts her for trying to sell her things. Rogelio surprises Paula with a piano, she gets ready to start her music lessons and Lucas becomes her first student. Erika wants to tell Rogelio about Lucas, he is surprised to see her at the opening of Paula's music school.
18	"No te acerques a Paula"	22 March 2023
Paula complains to Martina for trying to decide about her employees' personal lives. Rogelio visits Erika to question her about her return to Morelia and makes it clear that he does not want her near Paula.
19	"Un reguero de pólvora"	23 March 2023
Imelda berates Felipa for her suspicious attitude, as she is sure that no one will discover that she had the crib burned. Due to an emergency, Paula takes Lucas to the family dinner and upon introducing him, Martina discovers that Erika, Rogelio's ex-girlfriend, is back and has a son.
20	"¡Es mi nieto!"	24 March 2023
With the arrival of Lucas, Martina fears Rogelio's reaction if he were to realise how she often manipulated his life. Martina suspects that Erika is lying about Lucas being Rogelio's son, so she orders a paternity test. While observing her baby's room, Paula begins to feel sick and Rogelio fears the worst.
21	"¡Me robaste a mi hijo!"	27 March 2023
Martina finds the photo of Rogelio with Erika and suspects that Imelda put it there on purpose to upset Paula. Rogelio confirms that Lucas is his son. Martina torments herself thinking of all the suffering she unintentionally subjected Lucas to. Rogelio confronts Martina for meddling in his life and for missing out on the early years of his son, Lucas.
22	"Quiero que crezca como un Iturbide"	28 March 2023
Given Paula's condition, Rogelio asks Erika to wait a while before telling her the truth about Lucas. Lucas returns Martina's pin to her and Paula sees her suspicious attitude towards Erika's son. Erika tells Rogelio all about Martina's visits, when he complains to his mother, she argues that she is only trying to help him.
23	"La Monarca se fue para siempre"	29 March 2023
Imelda discovers she is pregnant and the family is thrilled. Cecilia informs Paula that it is thanks to Martina's foundation that some children received scholarships to the school. Knowing that Rogelio and Fernando are moving out of the house, Martina decides to move to the city to prove her importance. Imelda tells her mother that she can't stand Martina anymore.
24	"Sin ti mi vida no tiene sentido"	30 March 2023
Fernando informs Martina that Marco had an accident on his motorcycle. The doctor informs the Iturbide family that after the accident, Marco has paralysis in his legs, and do not know if he will walk again.
25	"¿Interrumpir el embarazo?"	31 March 2023
Rogelio questions Paula regarding her partnership with Ignacio, seeing that it wasn't her, Rogelio tells her that Cecilia's money comes from Ignacio. Rogelio visits Erika to talk about Lucas, Paula thinks that he is unfaithful with her doctor. Erika informs Paula and Rogelio of the bad news that their baby will be born with severe health problems and gives them the option to terminate the pregnancy.
26	"Está usted viendo a su hijastro"	3 April 2023
Martina visits Paula to confess her gratitude and admiration for her decision to continue with her pregnancy. Rogelio denounces Ignacio for doing business with illicit gasoline. Martina visits Ignacio to threaten him for messing with her sons, he confesses that he is Hipolito's son.
27	"La Monarca ha muerto"	4 April 2023
Honorio confirms to Martina that Hipólito was unfaithful to her with Irma. In view of the repercussions that Ignacio is Hipólito's son, Martina prefers to keep quiet about what she knows despite her lawyer's recommendation. Rogelio scolds Fernando for keeping secrets from him, he claims the same and Paula listens to them.
28	"No eres más que la amante"	5 April 2023
Paula and Luis decide to leave Rogelio alone so that he can calm down, Martina sees them in the garden and believes that they are in a relationship. Martina goes at Irma's house and makes it clear that Hipolito would never have divorced her to be with her, Ignacio comes to his mother's defense, but Irma assures him that she is afraid of Martina. While Erika debates whether to fight for Rogelio or not, Lucas learns that the man he thought is not really his father.
29	"Cuidarse entre todos"	6 April 2023
Martina explains to Fernando that he should never have entered into illicit business. Ignacio tells Cecilia all the pain he was subjected to for being an illegitimate son of Hipólito Iturbide. Erika learns that Lucas never went to his classes and in desperation, she seeks the help of Paula and Rogelio to find him. Fernando and Rogelio manage to forgive each other for the good of the family. Lucas contacts Rogelio, but runs away when he learns that he is to return to his mother, as he wants nothing to do with her.
30	"Su corazón dejó de latir"	7 April 2023
Rogelio assures Martina that it is his obligation to tell Lucas that he is his father. Rogelio decides to tell Paula the truth about Lucas and asks Erika to keep an eye out in case the news complicates the pregnancy. Paula begins to feel sick and when she goes to the doctor's office, she learns that her daughter's heart has stopped beating.
31	"Perdimos a nuestro bebé"	10 April 2023
Martina learns about the death of her granddaughter and mourns the news. Eva confronts Rogelio for lying to Paula about his relationship with Erika. In order to attend the Father's Day get-together, Paula asks Rogelio to accompany Lucas and pretend to be his father. Imelda tries to get rid of the photo of Rogelio and Erika, but only succeeds in getting Paula to find it and discover that they were once in a relationship.
32	"¡Se acabó!"	11 April 2023
Paula realizes that Lucas is Rogelio's son and leaves the Iturbide house; two months have passed and there is no sign of her. Martina offers Erika her support so she can win back Rogelio's love. Paula attends an audition to play music in a business and the owner is Ulisés, an old friend.
33	"¡Ya encontré a Paula!"	12 April 2023
Martina tells Erika that Rogelio is already looking for Paula and advises her to hurry to seduce him before he returns with Paula. Rogelio arrives at the restaurant where Paula is singing and sees her accompanied by Ulises, confirming rumors that she already has a boyfriend.
34	"Me viste la cara de estúpida"	13 April 2023
Rogelio starts yelling at Paula not to leave him, but the police intercede and stop him. Paula visits Rogelio to complain about his lies. Erika believes it is time to win back Rogelio's love and form the family they should have been a long time ago.
35	"Divorciémonos pacíficamente"	14 April 2023
Rogelio explains to Paula his past with Erika, but despite this, she still feels betrayed for keeping the secret. Martina informs Erika about Rogelio's divorce, Erika offers her friendship in an attempt to win him back. Ulisés takes advantage of Paula's vulnerable moment to confess his love to her. The Iturbide family meets with Mr. Garibay, but Martina is insistent on giving him the best impression.
36	"Voy a luchar por él"	17 April 2023
Gabriel informs the Iturbides about Ignacio's request to be recognized as Hipólito's son. Martina offers her forgiveness to Imelda's mother in exchange for her infiltrating Irma's life and reporting all her actions to her. Erika meets with Paula and warns her that she is willing to fight for Rogelio, who interrupts the meeting.
37	"Tener la sartén por el mango"	18 April 2023
Paula's lawyer tries to reach a financial agreement with Rogelio. Rogelio summons Ignacio to offer him a bonus in exchange for dropping the recognition lawsuit, but Ignacio insists on being an Iturbide. Ignacio interrupts the wedding to thank his brothers for their presence, thus humiliating the Iturbide family in front of the guests.
38	"Nadie puede humillarme"	19 April 2023
Apart from having humiliated the Iturbide family, Ignacio's announcement makes Cecilia regret marrying him. Marco does not hesitate to hit Ignacio. Martina gathers the women of the association to make it clear that she will not be walked over by Irma and they all reiterate their support.
39	"¡Yo soy tu padre!"	20 April 2023
Erika runs into Paula and makes it clear that she will fight to make Rogelio love her again, but Paula reminds her that he is still a married man. Cecilia is stood up by Ignacio at the airport and believes that he only made her fall in love as part of his revenge against the Iturbide family. Rogelio and Erika meet with Lucas to tell him that he is his biological father. Lucas leaves his house and seeks refuge with Paula.
40	"No me quiero divorciar"	21 April 2023
Tired of the arguments between his brothers, Fernando offers his support to Ignacio to mediate the problems with his family and reach an agreement. Irma tries to force Cecilia to move into her house, but Cecilia makes it clear that she will not allow her to interfere in her marriage. After suffering an accident, Paula arrives late for the hearing and surprises Rogelio with her decision not to divorce.
41	"Eres una mujer insaciable"	24 April 2023
Paula and Rogelio arrive home with the news that they are not divorced, ruining Martina's birthday party. Imelda points out to Fernando that he is underappreciated in the family and the company. Paula tries to talk to Martina to solve the problems between them, but Martina makes her see the reasons why she is not a suitable woman for her son. Lucas takes on the task of coming between Rogelio and Paula to make his mother happy.
42	"Es mi última palabra"	25 April 2023
Paula learns that Rogelio stood her up for celebrating his mother and knows that Erika was the one who omitted her from the celebration. Ignacio complains to Cecilia for not waiting for him at home and has an outburst. Rogelio wants to get close to Ignacio to keep an eye on him, in a fit of jealousy, Fernando complains to him and they confront each other again. Imelda complains to Paula about her presence in the house and slips down the stairs.
43	"Esa bebé no es mía"	26 April 2023
Erika informs Fernando that although the fall had nothing to do with it, Imelda is already in labor. Imelda doesn't recognize her daughter and blames Paula for her accident. Martina knows that Paula would never have thrown Imelda, but assures her that she did nothing to prevent the accident and threatens her so that nothing bad happens to her granddaughter. Ignacio confronts Cecilia for upsetting his mother.
44	"En la vida no hay casualidades"	27 April 2023
The exhumation of Hipólito's grave is reported in the newspapers, causing a crisis in the company, Fidel informs the family that it was Fernando who authorized it. Fernando is sad to see Imelda reject their daughter. Erika learns that Rogelio will travel to Miami and sees it as her last chance to seduce him and be by his side again.
45	"Estás hartando a Fernando"	28 April 2023
Paula is surprised to see Erika in Rogelio's room, but they makes it clear to Erika what her place in the family is. Imelda returns home with her baby, but she doesn't want to take care of her. Imelda has trouble calming Ada and Paula offers her help, she accepts and asks her to take her to sleep in her room. Martina takes advantage of Luis' absence to read his diary and confirms that he has always been in love with Paula.
46	"¡Mi mamá no despierta!"	1 May 2023
Martina calls Luis out for falling in love with Paula and he calls her out for keeping so many secrets. Paula hears that Imelda needs help with Ada, but when she tries to help, Imelda complains to her for trying to steal her daughter's affection. Lucas asks Rogelio for help because his mother fainted, when he arrives, she wakes up and confesses her love to him without caring that Paula is present.
47	"Exceso de confianza"	2 May 2023
Martina receives a gift from Gabriel that reminds her of the time when he asked her to marry him and they agreed to fight against her father's wishes out of love. After being kicked out of the house by Ignacio, Irma decides to take revenge on Cecilia. Ignacio realizes the chemistry between Fernando and Ximena and decides to follow them until he finds them in a compromising situation in order to blackmail Rogelio. Lucas accidentally hears that his mother has cancer and has little time left to live.
48	"Encárguense de mi hijo"	3 May 2023
Rogelio calls Erika and tells her that thanks to her carelessness, Lucas found out about her diagnosis. Ignacio gets into a fight in the same bar where the Iturbide brothers are and they all defend him. Erika reveals to Rogelio and Paula her diagnosis and asks them to take care of Lucas.
49	"Ignacio sí es un Iturbide"	4 May 2023
Erika comes clean with Paula and apologizes for trying to steal Rogelio's love, Paula offers her support. Irma assures Ignacio that she no longer has the will to live because she feels his rejection. Erika records a message for Lucas assuring him that she will always take care of him. Fernando offers Ignacio part of his shares so that they both have a say in the company.
50	"No pudimos salvarla"	5 May 2023
The doctor informs Erika that it is the best time to remove the tumor, Lucas does not want his mother to undergo the procedure, but she swears an oath to him. Erika wakes up from the operation, says a few words to her son and dies.
51	"Paula nunca va a ser mi mamá"	8 May 2023
Irma reads an old letter that Hipólito wrote to her before he died in which he expresses his intention to recognize Ignacio as an Iturbide to spare her future sorrows. Paula tries to comfort Lucas for the loss of Erika, but he reacts negatively to her. Paula begins to feel sick and faints, the doctor informs her that the reason for her discomfort is because she is pregnant.
52	"Tu madrastra está embarazada"	9 May 2023
Imelda hears that Paula is pregnant and gets jealous because she knows that she will lose control over the Iturbide family. Beatriz no longer wants Jimena to continue working with Fernando, Rogelio advises him to fire her. Imelda and Beatriz visit Irma to snoop in her house, when Imelda sees Hipolito's letters, she takes them to blackmail Martina. Imelda manages to turn Lucas against Rogelio and Paula. Martina is saddened to learn that Luis is no longer going to live with her.
53	"Hemos decidido casarnos"	10 May 2023
Martina learns that it was Imelda who told Lucas about Paula's pregnancy and complains about her attempts to harm her grandson. Beatriz and Martina discuss Fernando's relationship with Imelda and shows Martina evidence that her son is having a relationship with his secretary. Paula believes that the time has come for Lucas to see Erika's first video and manages to encourage him to move forward. Marco and Blanca get married in a surprise civil ceremony to Martina's surprise.
54	"Mi hijo se casó con la sirvienta"	11 May 2023
The family congratulates Marco on his wedding to Blanca, but Imelda is upset to see someone who used to be on the service staff joining the family. While looking for Lucas, Paula finds Martina kissing Gabriel.
55	"Quiero que nos divorciemos"	12 May 2023
Martina tries to convince Paula not to say anything about what she saw, but is surprised to learn that she has no intention of hurting her. Disappointed by Imelda's confessions, Fernando realizes that she never loved him and asks for a divorce. Beatriz reveals to Imelda that Fernando is having an affair with Jimena and shows her the evidence of his infidelity. Imelda gives Hipólito's letters to Martina and as she begins to read them, she realizes that they can be used against Irma.
56	"Lady Cornuda Iturbide"	15 May 2023
The video of Imelda attacking Jimena goes viral and reaches Martina, who complains to her for having humiliated the family in public. Fernando and Rogelio meet with a journalist, who helps them to change the focus of the video. Irma tries to convince Ignacio to abandon his attacks against the Iturbide family, but he explains that it is too late for that. Imelda lashes out at everyone in Villa Morelia and when she tries to speak ill of Paula in front of Lucas, Paula slaps her.
57	"No puedo más"	16 May 20235
With all the problems at home, Rogelio suggests Paula to look for a house of their own. Imelda receives a warning from Martina. Martina goes to see Gabriel but finds him with Vanessa. Imelda decides to leave Fernando. Cecilia suggests that Ignacio admit Irma to an institution and he goes crazy. Cecilia is willing to continue putting up with Ignacio's outbursts and prefers to abandon him. Lucas tells Rogelio that he heard Paula talking to Ulises all day and when he learns that they have a special affection for each other, he explodes with jealousy.
58	"Salud por la caída de los Iturbide"	17 May 2023
Eva confesses to Fidel that she is hiding a secret, including the death of Paula's parents. Imelda seeks out Claudio to make sure Jimena disappears from Fernando's life. Ignacio meets with a mysterious woman who plans to help him bring about the downfall of the Iturbide family.
59	"Negocios puercos"	18 May 2023
Fidel looks for Carmelo's house to get information that could help the Iturbide family get rid of Ignacio. Lucas is not thrilled with the idea of being the older brother. Carmelo meets with Rogelio and Fidel to sell them all the information they need to prove Ignacio's frauds. Martina has a fun time at Eva's bachelorette party. Fernando arrives late for Andrea's proposal, causing Imelda to become furious, confirming her marital problems to everyone.
60	"Aquí nos morimos las dos"	19 May 2023
Seeing Imelda on the verge of madness, Paula tries to fix whatever problems there are between them in order to show her that she only wants to help her. Eva and Fidel get married. Seeing that her blackmail against Martina didn't work, Irma decides to trap her in the cabin and thus put an end to their lives with the fire in the cabin.
61	"Voy a dejar de esconderme"	22 May 2023
Rogelio questions Martina to learn what she was doing in the cabin with Irma. Rogelio does not approve of the idea that there is something going on between Martina and Gabriel and demands that he stay away from his mother. After having been close to death, Martina is willing to fight for her happiness regardless of whether or not her sons approve. Rogelio investigates the cause of the fire and finds a lighter that once belonged to his father.
62	"Un amor que todos rechazan"	23 May 2023
Ignacio questions Irma about the fire, but she refuses to tell him the truth. Paula tells Rogelio that she already knew about the relationship between Martina and Gabriel, but Rogelio is upset at her for keeping his mother's secret from him. Imelda asks Fernando for a chance to be happy again. Martina gathers her children to announce that she is in a relationship with Gabriel, everyone is surprised by the news.
63	"Probar mi propia medicina"	24 May 2023
With her family's reaction to the news of her relationship with Gabriel, Martina assures Gabriel that she made a mistake she will soon regret. Rogelio returns Hipolito's lighter to Ignacio to and they both come to the conclusion that Martina or Irma set the cabin fire. Cecilia is tired of Ignacio's tempestuous outbursts, so she prefers to leave him. Beatriz offers to tell Ignacio the truth about the fire with the intention of ending the Iturbide empire.
64	"Ahora la que se va a divorciar soy yo"	25 May 2023
Ignacio tells Fernando that he found out that Martina has a letter that could help them discover what happened the day of the fire and asks him to look for it. While Imelda organizes everything for Fernando's surprise party, he is enjoying a romantic evening with Jimena. When she is discharged from the hospital, Irma is surprised by the police with an arrest warrant for making an attempt on Martina's life.
65	"Pasar sobre mi cadáver"	26 May 2023
Cecilia returns home to finish packing up her things, but Ignacio fills her with complaints about her abandonment and tries to prevent her from leaving again. Martina cancels her plans with Gabriel as her sons need her. Martina complains to Imelda for the way she behaved at dinner, but Imelda criticizes her relationship with Gabriel. Fernando finds Hipolito's letter and gives it to Ignacio, who is shocked to learn that Irma is to blame for the shortcomings that fueled his hatred towards the Iturbides.
66	"Me convertiste en un asesino"	29 May 2023
Paula asks Rogelio to give himself a chance to listen to Martina and stop coming between her and Gabriel. Thanks to the disappointment he suffers from finding Hipolito's letter, Ignacio realizes that he is incapable of change and believes he is doomed to unhappiness. Rogelio listens to Martina about her relationship with Gabriel. Ignacio confronts Irma for taking away the life he could have had and on his way out is run over by a mysterious vehicle.
67	"La perfecta familia"	30 May 2023
Adriana gets upset with Luis and makes a scene and rebukes him for his feelings for Paula, Rogelio overhears their conversation. Cecilia turns to Ignacio's psychologist for the help she needs to get closer to him and to discover the truth behind Hipolito's letter. Imelda takes advantage of Blanca's arrival from school to introduce her to Martina's friends as Marco's wife. Lucas plays a joke on Paula which causes her to run and trip down the stairs.
68	"Una enfermedad grave"	31 May 2023
Rogelio meets with Ignacio to repair their already damaged relationship, Ignacio believes that his brother is not showing genuine interest in him. Rogelio and Lucas take Paula to the doctor to be checked for her fall. Fernando and Imelda inform the family of the news that Ada may be suffering from a blood disease. Rogelio decides to confront Luis when he learns that he is in love with Paula.
69	"Aléjate de mi esposa"	1 June 2023
Luis tries to fix things with Rogelio but he rejects him for his betrayal. Cecilia receives advice to forget about other people's problems and focus on fixing her friendship with Paula. Irma suffers a relapse while in the mental institution, as she assures that Martina arranged everything to poison her food. Rogelio questions Luis about his motives for moving to Los Angeles, as he is sure it is to distance himself from Paula; she listens to them.
70	"Bienvenido a la familia"	2 June 2023
Beatriz takes advantage of Martina's absence at the foundation meeting to conspire against her to take away her presidency. Imelda ruins Martina and Paula's event by canceling the musicians' performance. Irma escapes from the mental institution and Rogelio helps Ignacio in the search, upon finding her, she sees him and tries to stab him. Rogelio invites Ignacio to eat with the family and the brothers accept him, Martina rejects him at first, but finally welcomes him as one of the Iturbide family.
71	"No me dejes, mamá"	5 June 2023
Paula talks to Rogelio about a proposal to continue singing with Ulises, but Rogelio gets jealous. Imelda accepts that her relationship with Fernando has come to an end, so she agrees to sign the divorce under one condition. Ignacio comments to Irma how happy he is to see his new relationship with the Iturbides, she is disappointed that he has given in so easily. Ignacio receives a call informing him that Irma took her own life, leaving a farewell note.
72	"Te ruego que acabes con ellos"	6 June 2023
The doctor informs Fernando and Imelda that Ada's tests showed positive results and that she is not suffering from a major illness. Fernando decides that the best thing for his life is not to have anything to do with Jimena, so he blocks her from his social media. Martina announces her candidacy as president of the foundation, Beatriz fears that her plans will fall apart. Rogelio, Fernando, Marco, Luis and Fidel surprise the women of Villa Morelia by performing a serenade.
73	"No acepto"	7 June 2023
Imelda learns that she is pregnant and is glad that her efforts to prevent Fernando from separating from her are paying off. Ignacio tells Fernando that he will distance himself and return the shares he gave him and advises him to buy more shares to become president of the company. Paula gets Luis to stop panicking before his wedding, Andrea realizes that he will never love her the way he loves Paula and refuses to marry him. Imelda acquires a package of shares in the Iturbide family's company and cedes her power to Fernando, thus giving him enough power to make him president.
74	"¡Ya nació!"	8 June 2023
Paula suffers a crisis because she does not know Rogelio's whereabouts. Cecilia tells Paula about the conversation she overheard between Ignacio and Imelda in which they talked about hurting Rogelio, so Paula decides to confront Imelda. Ignacio finds Rogelio in the hospital and challenges him to continue confronting him. Paula goes into labor, the doctor warns her that it will be a complicated procedure since she and her baby are in danger.
75	"Vengo a detenerlo"	9 June 2023
Imelda demands Felipa to steal the gift that Martina plans to give to Jazz. Felipa can no longer stand Imelda's blackmail and confesses to Martina about how evil her daughter-in-law is. Martina confronts Imelda for forcing Felipa to steal from her and warns her that she is on the same path of bitterness as her mother. Imelda shows her remorse for the first time, apologizes to Fernando and asks for a chance, but their happiness is overshadowed when Fernando is arrested for drug trafficking because of Ignacio.
76	"Están arruinados"	12 June 2023
Ignacio manipulates Fernando to make him believe that his imprisonment is Rogelio's fault. The scandal in which the Iturbides are involved causes the company's shares to fall, leaving them bankrupt. Imelda remembers the words Ignacio said to her the day of the company's inauguration and is certain that he is behind Fernando's problem. Gabriel informs the Iturbide family that the bank will sell Villa Morelia in order to pay off the debt for the loan they requested.
77	"Adiós Villa Morelia"	13 June 2023
Martina bursts into tears when she learns that she will no longer live in Villa Morelia. Rogelio confronts Ignacio about his complicity with Carmelo, Cecilia overhears them and is disappointed in Ignacio again, so she decides to keep quiet about her pregnancy. The owner who rents Paula the house to give her music lessons cancels her contract, due to the Iturbide's bankruptcy. The Iturbide family says goodbye to Villa Morelia to avoid meeting the new owner. Ignacio takes possession of Villa Morelia.
78	"Todo esto fue mi culpa"	14 June 2023
Concerned about the Iturbide's new situation, Beatriz offers Imelda to return home, but she assures her that the only help she is interested in is Fernando's freedom. Rogelio goes to job interviews, but is rejected thanks to Ignacio's actions. Fernando realizes that for Ignacio, he was just another piece in his plan against the Iturbide family and takes responsibility for the misfortunes he brought to the family. The Iturbide family receive an offer to sell a piece of land that will help them get out of debt.
79	"Esa mujer es el diablo"	15 June 2023
Ignacio discovers that Cecilia is pregnant; he assures her that she will not be able to separate him from their child, but Cecilia fears for her safety. Olimpia rejects any proposal to lend money to the Iturbides, but Rogelio confronts her because of her hatred for his mother. Felipa overhears Ignacio talking to Olimpia and immediately lets Mica know. Martina alarms her sons with her disappearance and travels to the city with the intention of confronting Olimpia.
80	"¡Nos mudamos a la Ciudad de México!"	16 June 2023
Martina accepts Olimpia's offer to move to the city to negotiate the sale of the land. Cecilia confirms her pregnancy to Ignacio, he refuses to let his son live without a father and plans something against Cecilia. Patricia plans to take advantage of Rogelio's problems to fight for custody of Lucas. Fernando travels to Morelia to confront Ignacio for his betrayal and also for putting him in jail.
81	"El verdadero padre de Rogelio"	19 June 2023
Beatriz meets with Olimpia to discuss Martina's bad decisions, causing her to lose power with the foundation. Cecilia schedules an appointment at a clinic to terminate her pregnancy. Ignacio meets Cassandra at a restaurant and they argue over the same table, afterwards they manage to negotiate. Olimpia confronts Martina with the idea that there is a possibility that Rogelio is not Hipolito's son.
82	"La misma representación del mal"	20 June 2023
Gabriel visits Olimpia in her office and advises her to forgive Martina for what happened in the past. Olimpia gathers the Morelia society to criticize the way Martina lives after a life of luxury. The women of the Morelia society inform Martina that they will hold a benefit in her honor, she rejects them and ends their friendship. Olimpia exposes Imelda about the debt she owes her for not paying for the clothes she bought from her store and Martina, seeing her sister-in-law's attitude, asks everyone to watch their behavior.
83	"Voy a jugar con los Iturbide"	21 June 2023
Fernando confesses to Imelda that the reason behind his stress is not only his current situation, but Olimpia's accusation to Martina regarding Rogelio. Paula accepts Olimpia's recommendation and contacts the school where they need a music teacher. Ignacio meets Cassandra on the street and invites her for a walk, unaware that she works for Olimpia. Rogelio learns that Paula has received a job offer and believes that she is going to neglect her newborn daughter.
84	"Tú eres hijo de Gabriel"	22 June 2023
Imelda and Beatriz take the samples of Rogelio and Gabriel to confirm if they are father and son. Olimpia refuses to give up on finding a missing relative, no matter how much money it costs her. Violeta invites Rogelio to lunch and will not give up even though she knows he is a married man. Fernando explodes against Martina, believing that her mother continues to lie to the family despite the trouble they are in, and reveals to Rogelio that Gabriel is his real father.
85	"Dar la última estocada"	23 June 2023
Paula tries to convince Olimpia to leave grudges behind and join the Iturbide family in a peaceful coexistence, but Olimpia prefers to keep her distance and makes Paula leave her office. Imelda gives Rogelio the result of the DNA test, provoking doubts in him about his true origin. Gabriel takes Martina to Morelia and while he goes to the store, she disappears; the Iturbide family is distressed by the news, but she is upset to learn that Rogelio took a DNA test.
86	"¿Te quieres casar conmigo?"	26 June 2023
The Iturbide family is surprised to hear that Martina went to Villa Morelia and was being cared for by Ignacio. Alejandra and Titi visit Cecilia to accompany her in her depression, now that she has divorced Ignacio. After forgetting Martina's birthday, Paula asks for Imelda's help to organize a surprise dinner for her. Gabriel surprises Martina by giving her an engagement ring minutes before her birthday celebration.
87	"Vivir con la culpa encima"	27 June 2023
Olimpia visits Gabriel without knowing that he is with the Iturbide family, Martina takes the opportunity to boast about her engagement. Paula visits Olimpia's office and inadvertently overhears a conversation about the search for her missing daughter. Martina does not know what she is doing at the hospital, Fernando makes comments to his mother that disturb the family. Fidel confirms to Fernando that Olimpia has been making contributions to Ignacio for a long time.
88	"Esta no es mi hija"	28 June 2023
The investigator informs Olimpia that he managed to find her daughter and they have even coincided in social events. Cecilia reveals to Ignacio the reasons why she hid her pregnancy from him. With Carmelo's death, Gabriel informs Fernando that he will be released from all charges against him. Paula realizes that Rogelio returned from the park with another baby who is not Jazz.
89	"¡Se acabó la pesadilla!"	29 June 2023
Felipa confirms that she is pregnant and surprises Melitón by revealing that she is expecting twins. Imelda realizes that she enjoys organizing events and proposes to Fernando to continue doing so, but he is upset to learn that she wants to bring money to the house. Olimpia visits her daughter in the hospital, but dies moments before confessing to her that she is her mother. Olimpia gives Martina the necessary documents to carry out the sale of the land, arguing that she wants to correct her mistakes.
90	"Quiero hacer una tregua"	30 June 2023
Not understanding Olimpia's sudden change, Paula explains to Martina that Olimpia lost a daughter. Although she is not ready to forgive her, Martina offers her condolences to Olimpia and acknowledges her as part of the family. Ignacio offers Martina a truce and gives her back Villa Morelia, making it clear that the war is not over yet.
91	"Siempre vendrán tiempos mejores"	3 July 2023
The Iturbide family returns to Villa Morelia and thanks to Gabriel they recovered all their belongings. Rogelio thanks Ignacio for giving him the villa and asks him to formalize the handover to keep the peace between them, but Ignacio plans not to be at peace with him. Imelda meets Violeta at Villa Morelia and seeing her interest in Rogelio, decides to put her in her place. Paula gets jealous when she sees Violeta cleaning Rogelio's shirt.
92	"¡No se muevan!"	4 July 2023
Paula is sure that Violeta wants to sabotage her marriage. Ignacio tells Cassandra that he is worried about his son's future as well as Cecilia's. With Martina and Gabriel's wedding around the corner, Martina is surprised with a bachelorette party and while enjoying the party, the women are assaulted by the entertainers they hired.
93	"¡Ayúdenme por favor!"	5 July 2023
Lucas learns that the thieves took the tablet where he had saved the videos his mother left him before she died. Violeta provokes Paula's jealousy by making her believe that she went out for coffee with Rogelio. Ignacio intercepts Cecilia again, she asks him to avoid uncomfortable moments. Alone with Jazz, Martina suffers another memory crisis and asks for help, believing that Jazz is a baby that was abandoned.
94	"Imelda emprendedora"	6 July 2023
Imelda and Fernando discuss José Juan's job proposal. Martina is worried about her mental health so she visits the doctor willing to have a series of tests done, but on the condition that he does not inform her sons. Paula tells Lucas that they managed to recover the stolen items, he surprises her by calling her mom. Martina reveals to the family that she will give Gabriel her power within the company, Rogelio and Fernando feel betrayed.
95	"¿Con quién pasó la noche tu esposo?"	7 July 2023
Surprised by Martina's decision, Gabriel asks her to reconsider, as he is certain her that her sons are capable of running the company properly. Fernando finds José Juan holding hands with Imelda and gets jealous, Imelda complains to him and makes evident his affair with Ximena. Violeta takes advantage of Imelda's argument with Fernando to make her believe that she is having an affair with Rogelio. The doctor informs Martina that preliminary tests show that her memory loss is due to a stroke.
96	"Lady Monarca"	10 July 2023
Martina learns of Violeta's meddling in Rogelio's life and visits her to demand that she stay away from him. Ignacio offers Violeta his help to achieve her plans to stay with Rogelio and get Paula out of her way. Cecilia gives birth to her son.
97	"En el amor y la guerra todo se vale"	11 July 2023
Fernando learns that Imelda went out to eat with José Juan and confronts them in a fit of jealousy. Violeta confesses her love to Rogelio and while he tries to push her away, she steals a kiss from him; Marco and Blanca see them.
98	"¿Despido injustificado?"	12 July 2023
Rogelio reacts to Violeta's kiss and fires her. Violeta's friend and advises her not to keep quiet and denounce Rogelio. Cassandra realizes that she cannot continue with Ignacio without first confessing her past to him. Rogelio tells Paula that Violeta kissed him, she complains to him for not setting limits earlier. Violeta confronts Rogelio for forbidding her to enter the company, he decides to put a stop to her, but as she flees, she is run over.
99	"Lo vas a pagar muy caro"	13 July 2023
José Juan confronts Rogelio when he believes that he is to blame for Violeta's accident and warns that he will pay for his actions. Violeta confesses to José Juan that she became obsessed with Rogelio to the point of causing the accident to frame him. Violeta explains to Paula that she misinterpreted Rogelio's signals, to the point of becoming obsessed with him.
100	"Tienes Alzheimer"	14 July 2023
Imelda puts a stop to Beatriz because she is tired of hearing her complaints that she prefers her job over her children. Martina asks Blanca to give her grandchildren. Violeta shows up at Villa Morelia to apologize for what happened with Rogelio. The doctor informs Martina that she has Alzheimer's disease.
101	"Tu enfermedad no tiene cura"	17 July 2023
Gabriel is worried about the strange attitude that Martina has taken in the last few days. When Martina confirms her illness, she decides to break up with Gabriel because she does not want him to suffer. Cecilia and Ignacio meet with the intention of reaching an agreement for the welfare of Camilo, Cecilia agrees to let Cassandra spend time with her son. When Ignacio sees assailants trying to shoot Fernando, he gets between them and saves his brother's life.
102	"Estoy cansado de estar enojado"	18 July 2023
Imelda informs Beatriz that Ignacio is in critical condition, Beatriz tells her that he cannot die because he would leave her alone in her revenge against the Iturbide family. Martina takes a notebook to write down each of her memories. Cassandra asks Cecilia to spend time with Camilo, Cecilia accepts and offers her friendship. Fernando confesses to Rogelio that he is tired of always being angry and feeling second for everything.
103	"Muy mala espina"	19 July 2023
Martina prepares herself for the moment when her illness worsens and she forgets her own sons. Martina informs the family that her wedding with Gabriel has been cancelled. Fed up with the constant arguments with Fernando, Imelda tells Martina of her plans to divorce him. Paula learns that Martina has been going out alone lately and is concerned about her behavior.
104	"Acciones que cambian el rumbo de las cosas"	20 July 2023
Martina thanks Ignacio for what he did for Fernando and asks him to join forces in the company. Paula begins to remember moments from her past, but when she sees an image of a woman she doesn't recognize, she decides to question Titi. While arranging Martina's bedroom, Mica finds her notebook and realizes that Martina is losing her memory.
105	"Tengo Alzheimer"	21 July 2023
Paula confronts Martina for hiding her illness, Martina warns her that if any of her sons learn of it, she will disappear. Fernando learns that Imelda missed her appointment because of José Juan and tells him to keep him away from her. Gabriel learns of Martina's illness and complains to her for having separated from him without his decision. Martina reveals to the family that she has Alzheimer's disease.
106	"Lo que viene va a ser difícil"	24 July 2023
Martina inadvertently causes a fire in the storage room and leaves Melitón locked up. Cecilia takes advantage of Ignacio and Cassandra's visit so that they can take care of Camilo while she attends to school matters. Beatriz rejoices over Martina's illness and is certain that her time has come to rule Morelia's high society. Martina realizes the havoc her illness could wreak and decides to stay at a rest home for patients with the same diagnosis.
107	"Que nadie me vea como una mujer enferma"	25 July 2023
Paula tries to convince Martina to stay at home, but Martina begs her to help her convince her sons that it is the best decision. Rogelio visits Pedro to help him with the restaurant and asks Fernando to take care of all the company's business. Mica begs Martina not to abandon her, as over the years she has come to see her as a sister. Gabriel decides to accompany Martina to the retirement home so as not to be separated from her.
108	"Voy a dejar la presidencia"	26 July 2023
Martina rejects Gabriel's sacrifice, but begins to feel jealous when she sees him with other patients. Beatriz visits Martina to offer her support with the foundation, but knowing that Beatriz will betray her, Martina takes advantage and tells her what she really thinks of her. Blanca worries about the tiredness she has been feeling lately, but Mica assures her that she could be pregnant. Rogelio reveals to his family that he is going through a crisis and thinks it would be best for Fernando to take over the company.
109	"Estoy loco por ti"	27 July 2023
Blanca confesses to Marco that she is pregnant. Rogelio submits his decision to leave Fernando at the head of the company to a vote and it is accepted. Andrea lets Luis know that she is engaged. José Juan confesses to Imelda that he is in love with her and kisses her, but she slaps him. Cassandra informs Ignacio of her decision to proceed with her engagement and adopt a child.
110	"No quiero tener este bebé"	28 July 2023
Norma gives Paula a trunk full of mementos from her childhood, including a diary from her mother. Rogelio warns Paula that she might find things in the diary that she shouldn't know, but she ignores him. Imelda asks Fernando to continue as they are in order to grow as people. While reading her mother's diary, Paula learns that her mother did not love her and even considered the option of terminating the pregnancy.
111	"No quieres que me entere de tu pasado"	31 July 2023
Rogelio tries to support Paula, but she asks him to do so from a distance. Rubén warns Beatriz that her obsession to be better than Martina could lead her to ruin her marriage. Paula's silence towards Rogelio causes him to have false suspicions. Cecilia tells Rogelio to stay out of Paula's situation until she decides to share it with him. Paula learns that Titi was involved in the death of her parents.
112	"No te quiero volver a ver"	1 August 2023
Paula complains to Eva for all the secrets she kept from her and rejects her. Fernando asks Imelda if she really loved him and if they still have a chance to reunite. Paula complains to Rogelio for sending someone to follow her and not trusting her.
113	"Un regalo de Dios"	2 August 2023
Ignacio surprises Cassandra with the news that he is planning their wedding. Gabriel and Martina get married and share their happiness in front of their loved ones. Rubén discovers Beatriz's intentions to create a fraud to affect Martina, and is disappointed in her. Lucas decides to interfere in Paula and Rogelio's marriage and explains to them that the reason for his discomfort is the stress caused by their estrangement and asks them to settle their differences.
114	"¿Cómo enfrentar los problemas?"	3 August 2023
Fernando and Imelda manage to come clean to fix their marriage and reunite. When Luis confesses to Andrea that he has not forgotten her and she is still the love of his life, she kisses him. Rogelio shows Paula the renovations he made to the restaurant, but she is disappointed by the name he has chosen.
115	"Eres la hija que nunca tuve"	4 August 2023
Paula demands that Rogelio give her space to process her feelings. Luis proposes again to Andrea. Ignacio tells Cecilia about his plans to adopt a child with Cassandra, Cecilia gets jealous. Martina asks Paula to regain her spirit of family unity, as she has chosen her as the next Monarch of the family.
116	"Los resentimientos pesan en el alma"	7 August 2023
Imelda tries to talk some sense into Beatriz about her attempts to open a foundation. Martina asks Eva to always protect Paula. Adriana and Luis get married. Martina apologizes to Ignacio for treating him like an outsider and they embrace.
117	"Gracias a la vida"	8 August 2023
An assailant threatens Martina to give him her belongings but Gabriel protects her. Rogelio tells Paula that he will always be there for her. Gabriel is grateful to be able to celebrate his birthday surrounded by his family and dies peacefully.
118	"Ayúdame a morir"	9 August 2023
Rogelio and Paula remember Gabriel's last words in which he asks them to trust in their love for each other. Martina continues her normal life without remembering Gabriel's death until Vanessa, unaware of her illness, mocks her delusions. Martina notices the inconsistencies between her reality and her memories and suffers when she learns of Gabriel's death. Martina asks Paula to help her die because she cannot bear to hear about Gabriel's death again.
119	"¡Me quieren robar!"	10 August 2023
Paula realizes that she and Rogelio are wasting time with their arguments and decides to reunite. Martina suffers a crisis in front of the family when she suggests that Rogelio marry Imelda. Beatriz is still obsessed with overcoming Martina's foundation and asks Rubén to increase her alimony. While shopping, Martina has another memory crisis and accuses Paula of trying to rob her, but Paula, while struggling with the officer, suffers a serious fall.
120	"Estaré en cada una de las flores de mi jardín"	11 August 2023
Days after her fall, Paula is still unconscious and Rogelio prays for her to wake up. Martina surprises everyone by remembering the musical notes to play her piano. Martina dies surrounded by her family. With Mica's help, Martina prepared a gift for Paula's 40th birthday, in which she thanks her for all the love she gave her family.
