= Fábrica de sueños =

Mexican anthology series

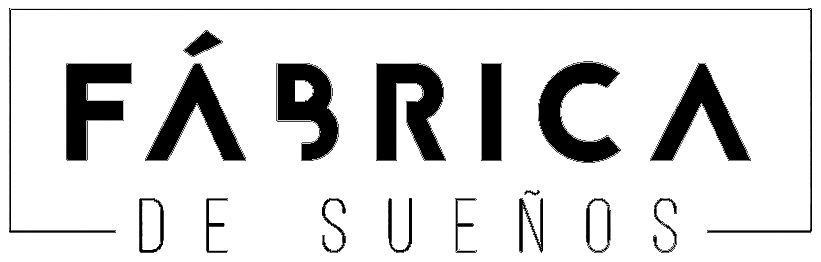
- Genre: Anthology series
- Developed by: Patricio Wills
- No. of series: 6
- No. of episodes: 268 (list of episodes)

Production
- Production company: Televisa

Original release
- Network: Las Estrellas
- Release: 2 September 2019 – present

Fábrica de sueños (English: Dream Factory) is a Mexican media franchise and anthology television series developed by Patricio Wills and produced by Televisa. The series revolves around great classics of telenovelas produced in Mexico during the 1980s and 1990s.

The series revolves around the reboot of great 11 classics of telenovelas produced by Televisa such as Cuna de lobos, Rubí, La usurpadora, El maleficio, Colorina, La madrastra, Los ricos también lloran, Rosa salvaje, Quinceañera, El privilegio de amar, and Corazón salvaje.

Its official catchphrase is Reescribimos La Historia (English: Rewriting History).

== Cast members ==
List indicators
- A green cell indicates the actor as a main cast member.
- A light blue cell indicates the actor as a special guest cast member.
- A red cell indicates the actor as a recurring or a guest cast member.
- A grey cell indicates the actor has not participated in the respective series.

Portrayer	Capacity and character per series					
Portrayer	La usurpadora	Cuna de lobos	Rubí	Los ricos también lloran	La madrastra	El maleficio
=== Starring ===
Sandra Echeverría	Paola Miranda de Bernal Paulina Doria					
Andrés Palacios	Carlos Bernal				Esteban Lombardo	
Arap Bethke	Facundo Nava					
Paz Vega		Catalina Creel				
Paulette Hernández		Leonora Navarro				
Gonzalo García Vivanco		José Carlos Larios				
Diego Amozurrutia		Alejandro Larios				
Nailea Norvind		Ámbar Reyes				
Flavio Medina		Francisco Larios				
Azela Robinson		Gélica Andrade		Elena Suárez		
Carlos Aragón		Diego Solórzano				
José Pablo Minor		Miguel Terranova Contreras				
Osvaldo de León		Luis Guzmán				
Leonardo Daniel		Carlos Larios				
Camila Sodi			Rubí Pérez Ochoa			
José Ron			Alejandro Cárdenas			
Rodrigo Guirao			Héctor Ferrer Garza			
Kimberly Dos Ramos			Maribel de la Fuente			
Ela Velden			Fernanda Pérez Ochoa			
Tania Lizardo			Cristina Pérez Ochoa			
Marcus Ornellas			Lucas Fuentes Morán			
Lisardo			Arturo de la Fuente			
Alejandra Espinoza			Sonia Aristimuño			
María Fernanda García			Rosa Ortiz de la Fuente	Sandra		
Henry Zakka			Boris	Father Guillermo		
Rubén Sanz			Eduardo	Uriel López		
Alfredo Gatica			Loreto Mata			
Giuseppe Gamba			Napoleón			
Valery Saís			Child Fernanda			
Antonio Fortier			Cayetano Gómez	Felipe Castillo		
Paola Toyos			Queca Gallardo	Matilde Vélez		
Mayrín Villanueva			Refugio Ochoa de Pérez			
Sebastián Rulli				Luis Alberto Salvatierra		
Claudia Martín				Mariana Villarreal		
Fabiola Guajardo				Soraya Montenegro		
Guillermo García Cantú				Don Alberto Salvatierra		
Alejandra Barros				Daniela Montesinos		
Víctor González				León Alfaro		
Aracely Arámbula					Marcia Cisneros	
Marisol del Olmo					Lucrecia Lombardo	
Juan Carlos Barreto	Manuel				Father José Jaramillo	
Juan Martín Jáuregui	Gonzalo Santamaría				Bruno Tejeda	
Fernando Colunga						Enrique de Martino
Marlene Favela						Beatriz de Martino
=== Recurring and Guest starring ===
Daniela Schmidt	Gema Vidal					
Aurora Gil	Teresa					
Queta Lavat	Piedad Mejía					
Ana Bertha Espín	Arcadia Rivas de Miranda					
Macarena Oz	Lisette Bernal					
Germán Bracco	Emilio Bernal					
Verónica Terán	Juana					
Montserrat Marañón	Monse				Cándida Nuñez	
Josh Gutiérrez	Molina					
Victoria Hernández	Olga Doria					
Lion Bagnis	Diego					
Paco Rueda	Pedro					
Emilio Guerrero	Pascual					
Ricardo Leguizamo	Wilson					
Gabriela Zamora	Irene					
Emiro Balocco	Dr. Restrepo					
Pierre Louis	Osvaldo					
Paulina Treviño		Margarita				
Emma Escalante		Mora				
Gerardo Murguía			Dr. Mandieta			
Juan Soler			Héctor Ferrer Garza			
Luis Gatica				Osvaldo Valdivia		
Darío Ripoll				Gregorio		
Arturo Carmona				Pedro Villareal García		
Ariel López Padilla				Efraín Torres		
Agustín Arana				Dr. Stramesi		
Sabrina Seara				Vivian		

== Overview ==
Series	Title	Episodes	Originally released	
Series	Title	Episodes	First released	Last released
1	La usurpadora	25	2 September 2019	4 October 2019
2	Cuna de lobos	25	7 October 2019	8 November 2019
3	Rubí	26	21 January 2020	27 February 2020
4	Los ricos también lloran	60	21 February 2022	13 May 2022
5	La madrastra	50	15 August 2022	21 October 2022
6	El maleficio	82	13 November 2023	3 March 2024

=== La usurpadora (2019) ===
Based on Inés Rodena's La usurpadora, the series tells the story of the twin sisters Paola Miranda and Paulina Doria, starring Sandra Echeverría, who meet again when Paola decides to start a new life, together with her lover Gonzalo Santamaría (Juan Martín Jáuregui), forcing her sister Paulina to assume her identity. In her eagerness to disappear, Paola simulates her own death, planning to eliminate Paulina, at a time when her husband, Carlos Bernal (Andrés Palacios), the president of the Republic, is going through a serious government crisis.

=== Cuna de lobos (2019) ===
Based on Carlos Olmo's Cuna de lobos, The series revolves around Catalina Creel (Paz Vega), whose great beauty is only surpassed by her cruelty, will go to any lengths to secure her fortune and bloodline.

=== Rubí (2020) ===
Based on Yolanda Vargas Dulché's Rubí, the series is a sequel that will not only address those aspects known to the public, but will explore what happened to the character years later.

The series is written by Leonardo Padrón and produced by W Studios for Televisa. Camila Sodi stars as the titular character.

=== Los ricos también lloran (2022) ===
Based on Inés Rodena's Los ricos también lloran, the series is produced by W Studios for TelevisaUnivision, and stars Claudia Martín and Sebastián Rulli.

=== La madrastra (2022) ===
Based on Arturo Moya Grau's La madrastra, the series follows Marcia Cisneros who, after spending twenty years in prison for a crime she did not commit, wants to be reunited with her family. While everyone believes she is dead, she sets out on a mission to find the real culprit and get her life back. The series stars Aracely Arámbula and Andrés Palacios.

=== La maleficio (2023) ===
Based on Fernanda Villeli's El maleficio, the series stars Fernando Colunga and Marlene Favela.

== Upcoming ==
Among the next projects scheduled to be released are: A new version of El privilegio de amar produced again by Carla Estrada, and Quinceañera.

== Production ==
Filming of La usurpadora began on 25 April 2019 and concluded in August 2019. Filming of Cuna de lobos began on 15 April 2019 and concluded in August 2019. Filming of Rubí began on 20 July 2019 and concluded in October 2019. Filming of Los ricos también lloran began on 20 September 2021 and concluded on 2 March 2022. Filming of La madrastra began on 6 June 2022. Filming of El maleficio began in July 2023.
