= Ophelia Pastrana =

Colombian-Mexican transgender comedian

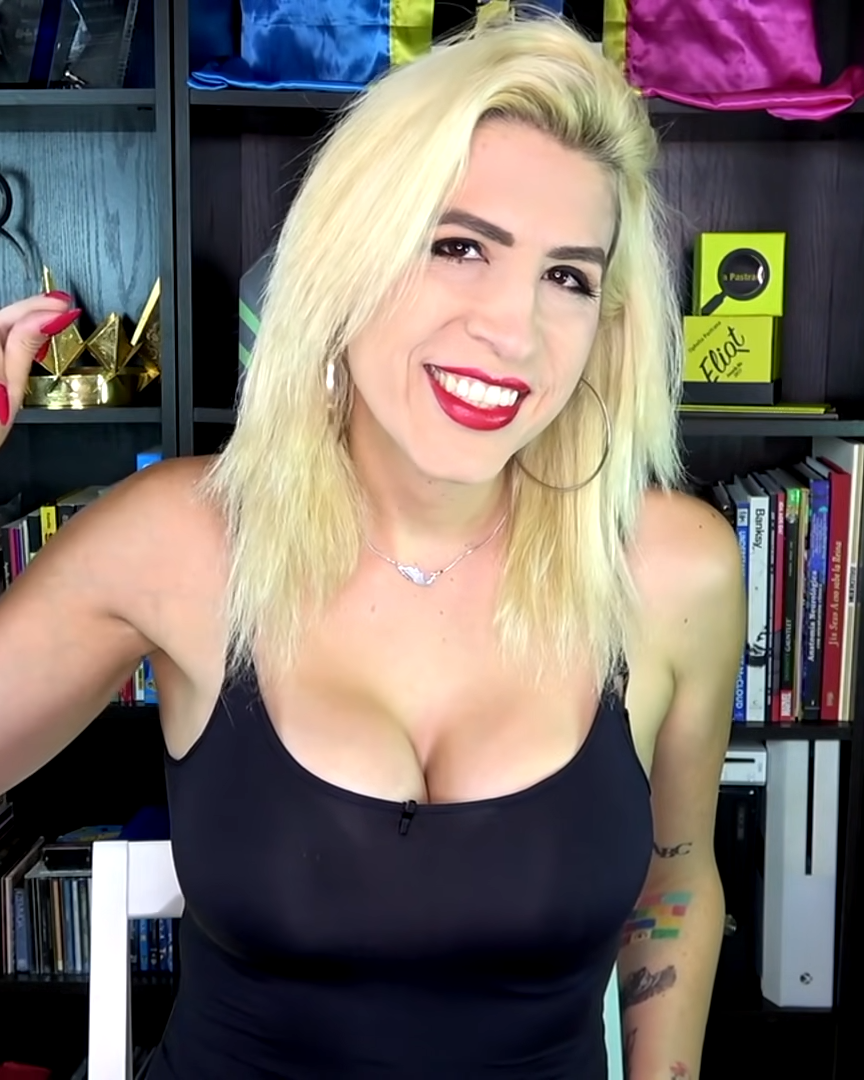
- Born: 4 October 1982 (age 43); Bogotá, Colombia
- Citizenship: Mexican
- Education: Florida Atlantic University University of Sydney
- Occupations: Physicist, actress, businesswoman, youtuber, technologist
- Honours: 100 BBC's Women
- Website: opheliapastrana.com

Ophelia Pastrana Ardila (born 4 October 1982) is a Colombian-Mexican transgender speaker, YouTuber, technologist and comedian. She is the first transgender woman naturalized by Mexico. Business Insider listed her as one of the most influential women on Twitter regarding technology aspects. In 2018 she was recognized as one of the BBC's 100 Women.

== Biography ==
She was born in Bogotá, Colombia. She grew up in one of the most conservative families in Colombia. Her uncle is the Colombian former president Andrés Pastrana, and her grandfather was Hisnardo Ardila, former mayor of Bogotá. During her childhood, she enjoyed playing the violin and spending time on the computer, she described herself as a quiet child with little social life.

She received a bachelor's degree in physics at the Florida Atlantic University. During college, she practiced competitive taekwondo. Upon completing her undergraduate studies in the United States, she moved to Sydney, Australia to get a master's degree in economics from the University of Sydney.

She married a woman, which triggered a stress crisis which led her to seek professional support and discover her sexual and gender identity. After three years of marriage, she ended the relationship, moved away from her family, and after a suicide attempt, moved to Mexico to start her life as an openly transgender woman.

After 10 years living in Mexico, in 2018 she received Mexican citizenship, being the first transgender woman naturalized by Mexico. During an interview, after getting her citizenship letter, she stated:

When I received the letter, the chancellor Luis Videgaray celebrated it. He post it on Twitter, but this implicated that they did a change in an immigration form that was 100 years old, this in the middle of the migrant caravan.

The paperwork to change her name and sex was very controversial. In Colombia, this was because of her last name and family, while in Mexico, her activism made her a target of attacks from conservative groups.

== Professional career ==
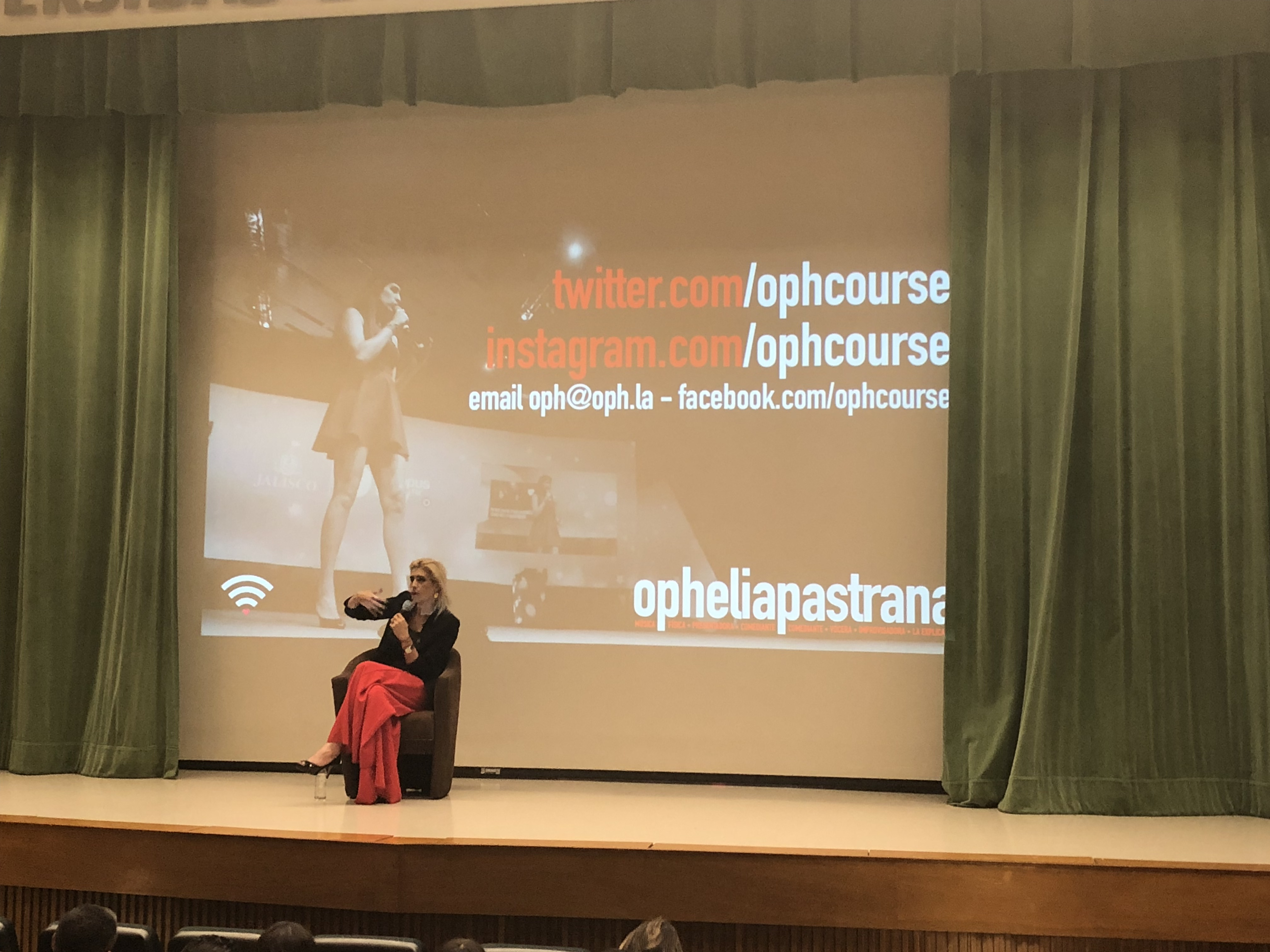
Ophelia Pastrana as a speaker in a conference at Universidad de las Americas, Puebla in Mexico.

Pastrana introduces herself as a digital strategist. As a businesswoman, she has created more than five companies. Among those, two agencies that were dedicated to creating marketing and communication strategies for different brands in Mexico such as Telmex, Telcel, Distroller, McDonald's, Nike, Reebok, Speedo, Nine West, and others.

Pastrana acted as a broadcaster in Coca-Cola FM. She also worked for CNET Networks, LatinWE, where she coordinated a piece in Despierta America with Mónica Fonseca entitled Las Mujeres También Hablamos de Tecnología (Women also talk about technology).

As an expert in digital content, Pastrana collaborates with media like E!, El Deforma, Atomix, Animal Político, Televisa, among others. She has participated as an expert speaker in events such as TEDx Talks and Campus Party, about topics related to technology and content creation.

In 2017, Pastrana debuted as a stand up artist, presenting herself as La Explicatriz (The Explainer). This is an improvisation performance in which the audience suggests the topics to be discussed during the show.

=== Activism ===
Pastrana has been part of a series of activities to raise awareness of the LGBTQ+ community. During her talks and digital activism, she speaks about the freedom that people should have to choose, and to go beyond that which was assigned at birth. Pastrana is a protector of human rights and argues that the value of people goes beyond their sexual identity.

Pastrana was the leader of the LGBT Pride March in different cities in Mexico and virtually during the COVID-19 pandemic.

On two occasions, she participated in the Senate of the Republic of Mexico as a speaker in the Roundtable of businesspeople of the Digital Agenda to transform Mexico.

== Honors and awards ==
Her career and digital activism have been recognized on multiple occasions and by different institutions.

- 2014: The magazine Business Insider included Pastrana in the list of the 100 most influential women Twitter in topics related to technology. She occupied the place 69. According to PeerIndex, who analyses the speed and quantity of other users seeing and sharing a creator's content, she occupies the place 76 among the most influential users of Twitter both in general topics and those related to technology.
- 2015: Nomination to the Eliot Award by the magazine Líderes Mexicanos. This was in recognition of her digital activism and social media communication.
- 2018: The BBC listed her as one of BBC's 100 Women. A list of the 100 most inspiring and influential women in 2018. She was one of the 12 Latin American women in the list.
- 2018: Forbes Magazine recognized her as one of the 100 Most Powerful Women in Mexico.
- 2021: She was recognized as Leader of the Year by the magazine Mujer Ejecutiva, in recognition of her social activism.
