= Jorge Caballero (actor) =

Mexican actor (born 1991)

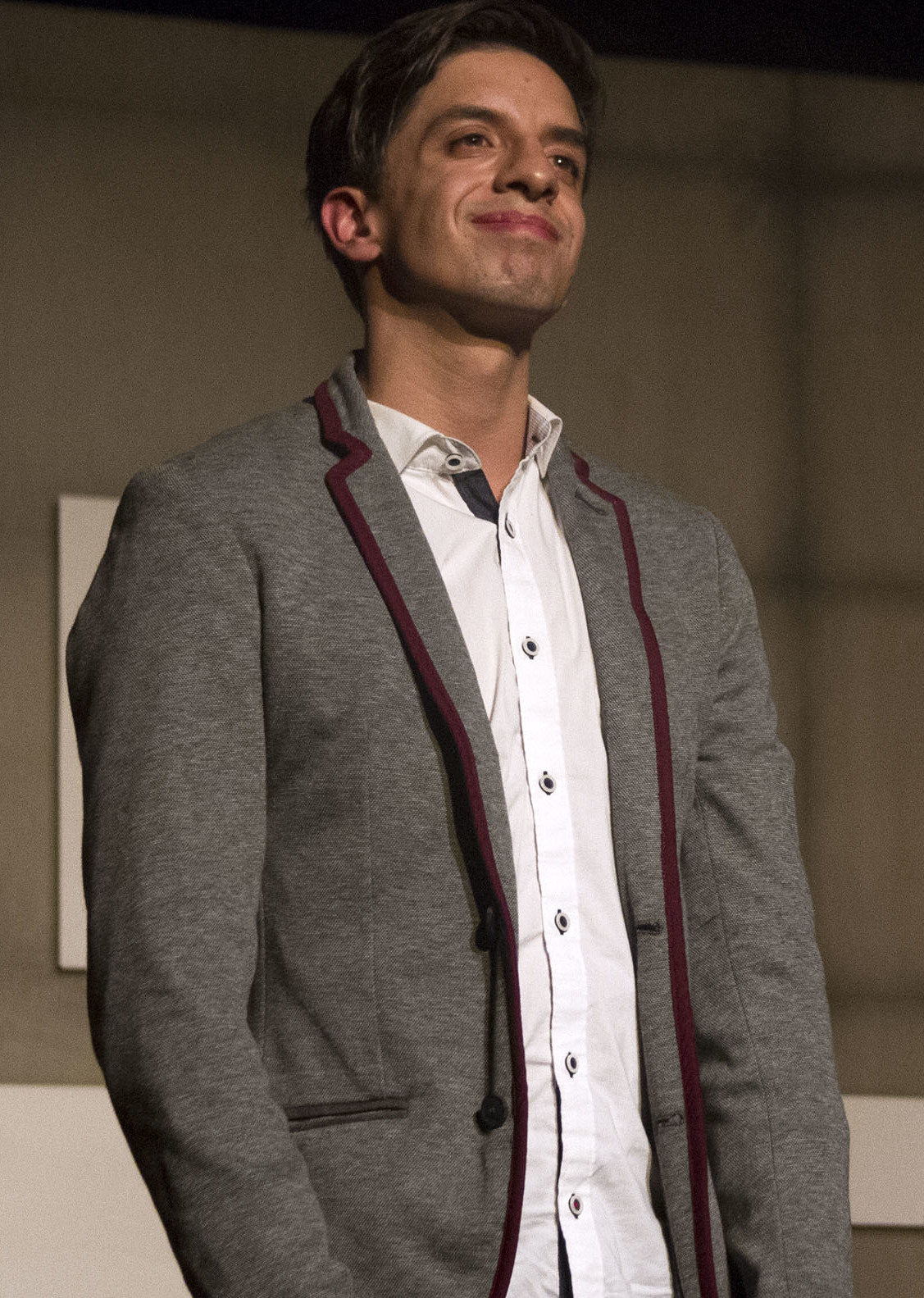
- Caballero in the play El chico de la última fila in 2015
- Born: 14 April 1991 (age 34); Mexico City, Mexico
- Occupation: Actor
- Years active: 2011–present
- Partner: Esteman (2019–present)

Jorge Caballero (born 14 April 1991 in Mexico City, Mexico) is a Mexican actor, best known in stage for his role of Claudio in the 2015 play adaptation titled El chico de la última fila, based on Juan Mayorga's book of the same name. He currently plays Matías in the Netflix's crime drama The Club.

== Personal life ==
Caballero currently has a relationship with Colombian singer Esteman since 2019.

== Filmography ==
Film roles
Year	Title	Roles	Notes
2014	Tiempos felices	Agency Researcher	
2017	Me gusta, pero me asusta	Serge	
2018	Ya veremos	Dark Man	
2018	Leona	Elías	

Television roles
Year	Title	Roles	Notes
2011	Bienvenida realidad	Ramiro Alarid	
2012–2018	Como dice el dicho	Various roles	3 episodes
2012	Capadocia	Octavio	Episode: "El justo"
2013–2018	Sr. Ávila	Ismael Rueda	Series regular (seasons 1–4); 17 episodes
2013	Las trampas del deseo	Matías Sánchez	
2014	Dos lunas	Ignacio "Nacho" Valencia	Episodes: "Al borde" and "Fantasmas"
2015	El Torito	Jordy	Series regular; 24 episodes
2017	Érase una vez	Renzo	Episode: "Blanca Nieves"
2017	Pedro perdió la cabeza	Don Fernando	Episode: "Infra-TV"
2019	Preso No. 1	Young Ramsés Cota "El Faraón"	Recurring role; 6 episodes
2019	The Club	Matías	Main role (season 1); 25 episodes
2020	Herederos por accidente	Alex	Main role
