= Valentino, Be Your Own Hero or Villain =

Valentino, Be Your Own Hero Or Villain
- Film poster
- Directed by: Alfonso Pineda Ulloa; Alejandro Ricaño
- Written by: Alfonso Pineda Ulloa; Juan Avila; Camila Soto; Tania Tinajero
- Produced by: Maria Ayub; Vianney Barragan; Tania Benítez; Bruce Boren; Ricardo Costianovsky; Tomás Darcyl; Fernanda Figueroa Flores; Karina Juarez; Mariana Oropeza Borja; Tanya Paleta; Inna Payán; Luis Salinas
- Starring: David Chocarro; Dulce María
- Release date: 2022
- Running time: 88 minutes
- Country: Mexico
- Language: Spanish

Valentino, Be Your Own Hero Or Villain (Spanish: Valentino, puedes ser tu propio héroe o villano) is a 2022 Mexican comedy film directed by Alfonso Pineda Ulloa & Alejandro Ricaño and written by Alfonso Pineda Ulloa, Juan Avila, Camila Soto and Tania Tinajero. It features David Chocarro and Dulce María.

== Synopsis ==
Gonzalo is a telenovela actor whose life is complicated by his demons turned into an alter ego named Valentino, making an appearance. The wedding of a famous producer, Valentino shows up to land the role of his career.

== Cast ==
The actors participating in this film are:

- David Chocarro as Valentino / Gonzalo Ferrat
- Dulce María as Carmen
- Mauricio Argüelles as Charly Ventura
- Artús Chávez as Juan David
- Adriana Montes de Oca as Ana
- Adriana Llabres as Nini News
- Daniel Haddad as Roger
- Tato Alexander as Judge
- Ari Albarrán as Rosita
- Alexia Alexander as Alfonsina
- Irina Baeva as Sarah Marure
- Sofía Campomanes as Iise
- Ryan Carnes as Steve
- Ximena Córdoba as Martha
- Arturo de La Rosa as Patient
- Adriana Fonseca as Marcia
- Julián Gil as Fernando
- Elizabeth Guindi as Aunt Chayo
- Martha Claudia Moreno as Aunt Fernanda
- Regina Orozco as Luisa Acosta
- Natalia Payan as Nurse
- Claudia Ramírez as Elena
- José Sefami as Ernesto Acosta
- Horacio Trujillo as Priest
- Minnie West as Marisol executioner
