= Amparín Serrano =

Mexican graphic designer (1965–2022)

- Born: 31 October 1965; Mexico City, Mexico
- Died: 12 August 2022 (aged 56)
- Other name: Amparín Serrano
- Education: Universidad Anáhuac México Campus Sur
- Occupation: Graphic designer Businesswoman Theater producer Ex-singer Illustrator
- Known for: Distroller
- Notable work: Ksi Meritos/Neonatos bebés

Amparín Serrano or Amparo Serrano Espinoza (31 October 1965 – 12 August 2022) born in Ciudad de México was a Mexican graphic designer, famous for having created the Distroller brand, "Virgencita Plis" that caricatured the image of Our Lady of Guadalupe, and the "Ksi meritos/Neonate Babies" that featured baby dolls, but were criticized for politicizing the Abortion debate to kids.

== Personal life ==
Amparo Serrano Espinosa is the granddaughter of Manuel Espinosa Yglesias, Mexican banker, and daughter of Amparo Espinosa Rugarcía. Amparo Serrano married David West, American producer and president of Westwood Entertainment, and was the mother of Amparo Alexia West, artistically known as Minnie West, a Mexican actress, and Camila West. Amparín was originally a member of the music acts Media Luna with singles "La Luna", "Dime por qué" o "Sueños", and Flans with Ilse, Ivonne, and Mimi before they rose to fame as a Girl group in the mid-1980s to the early 1990s. According to Amparín's daughter declarations, Amparín fell off a railingless balcony in her house, causing her death.

== See also ==
- Amparo Serrano Iglesias
