= La usurpadora (2019 TV series) =

2019 Mexican television series

- Genre: Drama
- Based on: La usurpadora by Inés Rodena
- Written by: Larissa Andrade; Tania Tinajero Reza; Gabriela Rodríguez; Jacques Bonnavent; Javier Van de Couter; Levinton Sol
- Directed by: Francisco Franco; Nelhiño Acosta
- Ending theme: "Tu lugar es mi lugar" by Sandra Echeverría
- Country of origin: Mexico
- Original language: Spanish
- No. of seasons: 1
- No. of episodes: 25

Production
- Executive producer: Carmen Armendáriz
- Producers: Alexa Muñoz; Abraham Quintero B.
- Production locations: Mexico City, Mexico; Bogotá, Colombia; Playa del Carmen; Cancún, Mexico
- Camera setup: Multi-camera
- Production company: Televisa

Original release
- Network: Las Estrellas
- Release: 2 September – 4 October 2019

La usurpadora (English: The Usurper) is a Mexican television series produced by Carmen Armendáriz for Televisa. It is a reboot based on the 1998 Mexican telenovela of the same name and the first series of the anthology series Fábrica de sueños. In the series, the character Paola Miranda, the First Lady of Mexico, discovers she has a twin sister and tries to swap lives with her.

The show began filming on 25 April 2019, with the first five episodes given a special pre-release online on 30 August 2019. The series then ran from 2 September to 4 October 2019, on Las Estrellas. The first and only season consisted of 25 episodes.

== Plot ==
Paola Miranda, the First Lady of Mexico, is in an unhappy marriage to Carlos, the President. At the outset of the show, she discovers that she is adopted and has a twin sister; though she resents the twin she believes made their mother disown her, Paola sees an opportunity to escape her life and seeks her out. Paola plots to pull a Prince and the Pauper switch with her newfound twin, Paulina Doria, to stand in as First Lady on Independence Day, and then kill her. With her identity (and the twin she despises) dead, Paola could run away with her lover Gonzalo.

Paulina is based in the capital of Colombia, Bogotá, running an orphanage and tending to her ageing mother, Olga. She is mysteriously offered large donations from a Mexican benefactor to trick her into traveling there. She is kidnapped by Paola, who threatens to murder Olga to blackmail Paulina into assuming her identity for two weeks. Paulina accepts the role and becomes the "usurpadora", moving into Los Pinos, the presidential palace.

During the Independence celebrations, Paulina is shot. However, not only does she live, but the National Intelligence Center opens an investigation into the shooting, thinking that the President was the real target. The President himself also hires a private detective, the former agent Facundo Nava, to investigate. Paola has already run away with Gonzalo to Bora Bora; she is still not satisfied and kills him there, returning to Mexico City to cover her tracks.

Meanwhile, Paulina takes to her new role, finding her new public standing the perfect opportunity to engage in social activism. Paola is unimpressed with the total usurpation of her life by the twin she hates, and tries to kill her again using a friend of Gonzalo's, Manuel, who has professed he would kill for her. Facundo is almost hit in the attempt and begins working directly with Paulina to find the new attacker. Paulina returns to Colombia to make sure that her mother is still alive, trusting Facundo to find out everything. Paola tries to return to her role and, since the two weeks are over, asks for Paulina to give up the life she has grown to love.

Paulina is not willing to sacrifice her position of social influence for charity and begins her own scheme: acting crazy to get committed, and using the real story to receive a diagnosis of multiple personality disorder. Paola tries once more to kill her but instead is mistakenly attacked by Manuel's sister, Teresa, who was supposed to be helping her. Facundo breaks Paulina out of the hospital and takes her to the countryside; Paola is taken to Colombia after being misidentified as her sister after the attack, with her confusion ruled as post-traumatic stress.

Olga realizes who Paola really is at the same time that Paulina is returned to Los Pinos by Facundo saying she is cured. Paulina convinces Carlos that she isn't crazy and has him travel to Colombia with her to meet Olga. Paola, Paulina, and Olga come to an agreement whereby the twins will continue swapping lives for a little longer, so that Olga has some time to get to know Paola. Only a few days later, though, she dies, with Paola determinedly returning to Mexico.

== Cast and characters ==
The First Family in the pilot episode of the series, "México perdió a la primera dama": (L–R) Lisette Bernal (Macarena Oz), Paola Miranda de Bernal (Sandra Echeverría), Carlos Bernal (Andrés Palacios), and Emilio Bernal (Germán Bracco)

Part of the cast was revealed by the Las Estrellas website on 25 April 2019.

The episodes of the show do not feature a title sequence; subsequently, in each episode, the entire cast minus stars Sandra Echeverría and Arap Bethke are credited. In episode one, Echeverría and Bethke are also credited.

The three main actors are Echeverría, who plays both Paola Miranda de Bernal, the First Lady, and her twin sister Paulina Doria; Bethke, who plays the former police commander Facundo Nava; and Andrés Palacios, who plays Carlos Bernal, the President of Mexico.

Announced later, the secondary cast features several of the relatives of the main characters: Daniela Schmidt plays Gema Vidal, the assistant and lover of Bernal; Juan Carlos Barreto plays Manuel Hernández, who is in love with Paola, with Aurora Gil as Manuel's crazy sister, Teresa. Queta Lavat was added as Piedad Mejía, Bernal's mother.

The remaining members of the cast were revealed when the show went to air:

- Ana Bertha Espín as Arcadia Rivas de Miranda, Paola's adopted mother
- Macarena Oz as Lisette Bernal, Carlos and Paola's daughter
- Germán Bracco as Emilio Bernal, Carlos' son
- Verónica Terán as Juana, the housekeeper of the presidential house
- Montserrat Marañón as Monse, Paulina's nurse and assistant
- Josh Gutiérrez as Molina, the de facto head of security at the presidential house
- Victoria Hernández as Olga Doria, the biological mother of Paulina and Paola
- Nadia Rowinsky as Paulina, Paola son
- Lion Bagnis as Diego, Lisette's boyfriend
- Paco Rueda as Pedro, Facundo's assistant
- Emilio Guerrero as Pascual, the official head of the First Family's security
- Ricardo Leguizamo as Wilson, Paulina's ex-boyfriend in Colombia
- Emiro Balocco as Dr. Restrepo, the doctor who was hired on Paola's behalf to kill her mother
- Gabriela Zamora as Irene, Facundo's lover
- Pierre Louis as Osvaldo, Pedro's boyfriend
- Juan Martín Jáuregui as Gonzalo Santamaría, Paola's lover

== Production ==
=== Development ===
The series was inspired by a story from Cuban telewriter Inés Rodena and largely based on the 1998 version, La usurpadora.

Claimed as a major difference compared to the 1998 show, the producers insisted on using the modern American format of 25 episodes that are produced in one block; despite this oddity in terms of Mexican productions, Carmen Armendáriz said the series "would not lose its telenovela essence". The creative team also wanted to update the story's context, too, changing the businessman and trophy wife leads to the President and First Lady; including settings in other countries (primarily Colombia) to show an international Mexico; and changing the two sons of the leads in the original into a son and daughter, who are also step-siblings.

=== Casting ===
On 9 April 2019, People en Español magazine confirmed that Sandra Echeverría would be the new protagonist of the remake. Echeverría said that to play Paulina she took a workshop where she learnt how to speak in a Colombian accent; a reviewer found that the accent improved through the show. Carolina Cano was hired shortly after Echeverría to act as the stand-in for the twins in scenes where they are both present; these scenes were described as Echeverría to be the hardest, not because she had to film them twice, but because any movement in the scene had to be recreated perfectly by both her and Cano. In scenes where both twins' faces can be seen, the production used motion capture. The director of photography, Abraham Reyes Pérez, said that not only does Cano look very similar to Echeverría, but she also acts in a similar way and quickly learns the processes of character doubling.

=== Filming ===
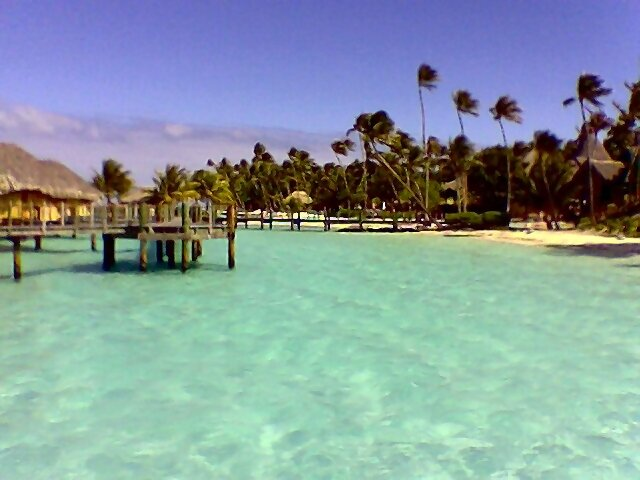
Bora Bora Beach was recreated in Playa del Carmen.

A lot of the story takes place in the presidential palace, Los Pinos. Ernesto Esteva, in the art department of the production, said that the house was based on European styles, and more specifically on "what was brought from the old continent to New Spain". It was built on a sound stage at Televisa because there were no locations in Mexico City that matched the image the production was trying to achieve. However, Esteva says that there were old buildings in other regions, including Puebla, Tlaxcala and Hidalgo, on which certain parts of the building were based. The palace in the series is not modeled on the real Los Pinos in terms of design and architecture, but Esteva says that the scope of the buildings is similar, so that the events of the show could realistically be happening within the appropriate spaces. The network says that 30 people worked around the clock, and built the functioning palace set in five weeks at a cost of 8.5 million pesos, 4 million of which went on creating the facade.

The early scenes in Bora Bora were filmed at the Playa del Carmen in Cancún, with the production only sending a small crew and the two relevant actors, Echeverría and Jáuregui. Shooting also took place on the Riviera Maya, featuring the presidential suite of the Mayakoba Hotel.

== Reception ==
=== Critical response ===
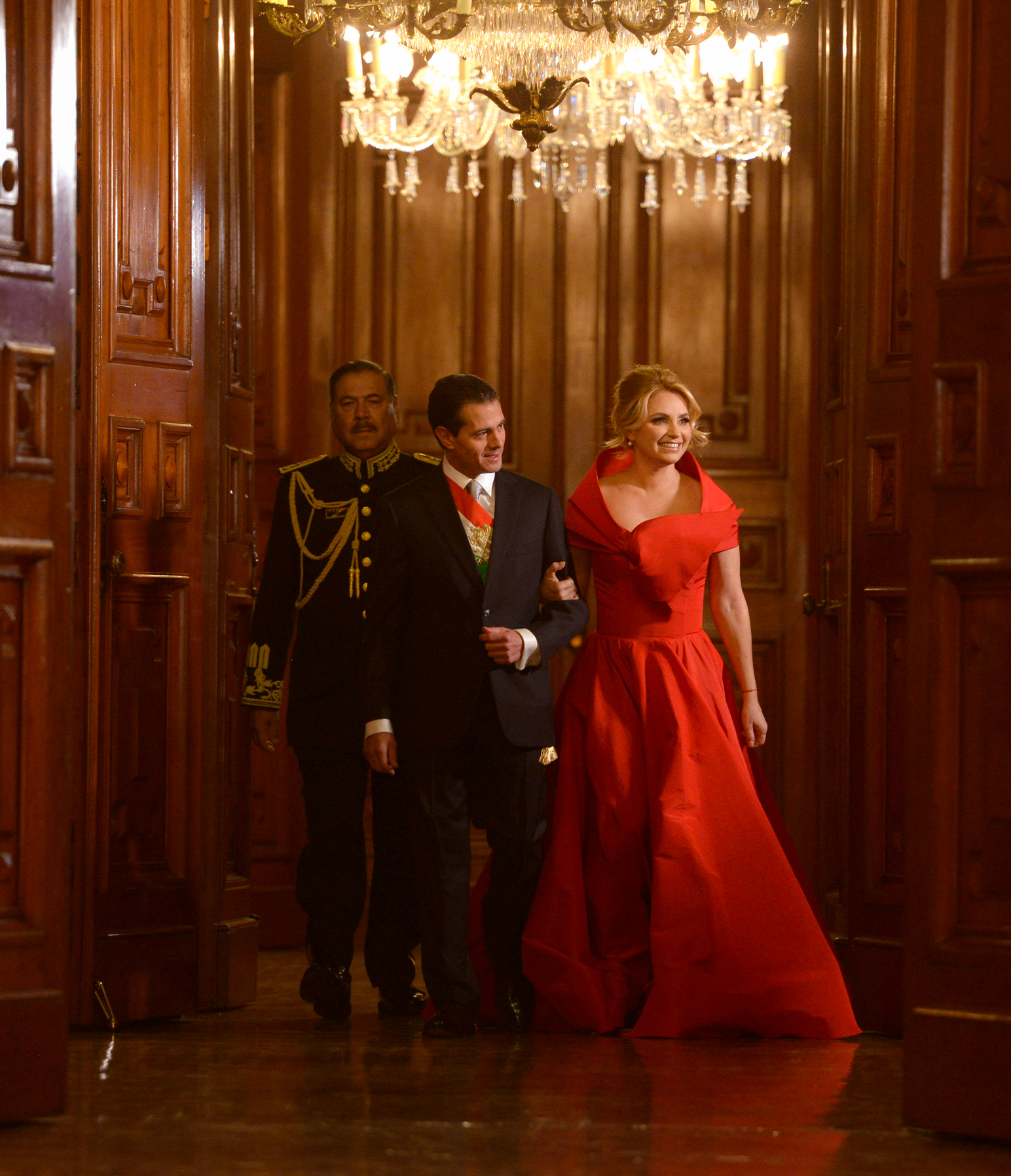
Former President Enrique Peña Nieto, and former first lady Angélica Rivera, during the Cry of Dolores in 2018. The moment is fictionally recreated in the series to start the plot.

The website La hora de la Novela gave a positive review of the first episodes, commending the special effects and choice of locations. However, the "visual look" of the show was criticized, with the reviewer suggesting that the production has made the show "cold in blue and gray tones" to make it look serious, and that this is especially jarring with the scenes set in Bora Bora, where one would expect warm and striking tones to show the tropical destination. The ending theme, a ballad, was also described as not fitting the tone of the show. Overall, the website wrote that the first week of the remake left a "good taste in the mouth", saying that it had a high production quality; lighting that got better with each episode; good structure and non-invasive music; and producers and writers that are talented at adaptation, keeping the story intact but also modernizing it well.

Giving a negative review, Álvaro Cueva of Milenio said that though the production tried to make the show into a series, it was still very much a telenovela, and noted that it came to Mexican television at a bad time, relating it to the first report on the Andrés Manuel López Obrador presidency. Cueva said that the show was too morbid and that its creators must have "serious mental issues"; he also criticized that the first episode details a plot to assassinate the First Lady during Independence Day, and so could be giving ideas to radicals who would really try such a thing. Unlike La hora de la Novela's warm view of the production's recreation of the show, Cueva referred to it derogatorily as "refrito", saying it was a mockery to the Mexican audience; he explained that the original was a focused show that knew its audience, and opined that the new production lacked this, saying that the writers haven't even modernized it because they were off-the-mark with what a modern woman in Mexico wants, which is not, in Cueva's view, something as simple as being First Lady.

Abraham Reyes of the La Neta Noticias website commented that the production never managed to obtain the same rating level that episode 1 had during its broadcast. According to Reyes, the final episode of the series was described as "bland, flat and boring", since it offered nothing new with respect to its previous version. Since its end on 4 October 2019, several followers of the production claimed to prefer the 1998 version, to the 2019 version.

For its part, with respect to the end of the series, the website La Hora de la Novela gave positive reviews, praising Carmen Armendáriz's production as one of the best in 2019. But she also criticized the abrupt end that was given to the series with Andrés Palacios and Sandra Echeverría staying together as a family, and leaving Betke out. In addition to giving good reviews regarding the protagonists, the work of the actors Juan Carlos Barreto, Aurora Gil, Ana Bertha Espín, Queta Lavat and Paco Ruedas was also praised.

=== Popular response ===
The Venezuelan actress Gabriela Spanic, who starred in the 1998 version, lauded the series, commending the quality and praising Echeverría, saying that she loves it and that Echeverría is "an excellent actress of the new generation. I really like her work [...] she is doing great. I am very happy that I can say I love the success this is having".

== Other versions ==
Rodena's 1998 telenovela, the basis for the show, was itself based on Daphne du Maurier's 1957 The Scapegoat, and took inspiration from several previous Latin American versions, particularly a 1971 Venezuelan telenovela of the story. In 1981, Valentín Pimstein made the first Mexican version of Rodena's novel, called El hogar que yo robé, with Venezuela creating another version, called La intrusa, in 1986. Though the 1998 version was the most popular during its run and is said to be not only the best version, but one of the most popular of all telenovelas, another remake had been made in 2012, ¿Quién eres tú? co-produced by Mexico with Colombia and the United States.

== Analysis ==
The character of Carlos Bernal, the President of Mexico played by Andrés Palacios, has been compared by La Hora de la Novela to have similarities with figures like the Nuevo León governor Jaime Rodríguez Calderón and former president Enrique Peña Nieto, who also, like Bernal, had children out of wedlock.

== Episodes ==
The title of each episode refers to a phrase mentioned by a character in it.

No.	Title	Mexico air date	U.S. air date	Mexico viewers (millions)	U.S. viewers (millions)
1	"México perdió a la primera dama"	2 September 2019 (Note: Premiered early online through Las Estrellas website on 30 August 2019.)	16 September 2019	3.9	1.75
Carlos Bernal is the unaffiliated President of Mexico. He discusses with his assistant, Gema, how he managed to achieve presidency without party backing and looks out from the Los Pinos balcony to the independence monument; Gema reaffirms his talents before his wife, Paola, joins them. Paola requests a drink, and with it receives a mysterious note that says "I found 2407". Later, Paola ventures out, dispensing of her bodyguard to meet with a man who gives her photos of an estranged identical twin living in Colombia. The next day, Bernal arranges the perfect family photo, though it is obvious they are all just keeping up appearances. His son from out of wedlock, Emilio, arrives drunk, and their daughter Lisa argues with her mother, who won't stop criticizing Lisa's weight through the whole process. Elsewhere, a young and handsome man, revealed to be Gonzalo, gets a gift from his lover, asking if he misses her. After the family photo has left them raw, Bernal and Paola have a tense dinner party with friends, organizing a trip that none are interested in; disenchanted with her life, Paola blows up at the end of dinner and asks Bernal for a divorce. However, the pressure of maintaining an image that has exhausted her is still seen by him to be vital, and he refuses; during an outburst, Paola receives another sly message, sneaking off again. Paola meets with Gonzalo, and the two organize their own trip passionately, choosing the exotic Bora Bora. However, Paola knows she cannot just disappear from public or her family and tries to find a way for somebody to cover for her vacation. Manuel, a confidante of Paola, suggests that trying to start a double life is dangerous; Paola reveals to him a plan to use her newfound twin as the perfect double so she can escape her life. In Colombia, Paulina, the spitting image of Paola, is working in a charitable foundation and returns home to tend to her sick mother. She receives a phone call from Manuel, claiming to be a company in Mexico that wants to donate to her cause. Paulina is invited to Mexico City, but during the flight is drugged and taken into the private cabin, where Paola tells her she must become her double. When Paulina initially refuses, Paola threatens that she will kill their mother. Agreeing, Paulina is whisked into training to lose her Colombian accent and transform her into a carbon copy of her twin. In a tense moment, Paulina is greeted by mother-in-law Doña Piedad when she first arrives at the presidential palace, but Manuel helps her escape the situation. Paola, able to be with Gonzalo, starts to unpack the situation with her twin, ranting that their mother must have preferred Paulina, and that she herself isn't able to live a life that suits her, becoming more angry at Paulina. Meeting the president at home, Paulina's attitude surprises him, but only pleasantly, and he doesn't suspect her. In Bora Bora, Paola proposes marriage to Gonzalo, and he accepts. Days later, the Independence Day celebration commences with an attack against the First Lady.
2	"Facundo Nava"	3 September 2019	17 September 2019	3.5	1.90
Paola's plans did not go as she thought. After the attack against the first lady, Gonzalo, (despite being a trafficker), is scared by the scope that her lover can have, and leaves the room and leaves Paola claiming that she is crazy. Paola is enraged and begins to destroy everything in the room. Meanwhile, in the presidential residence, chaos and terror reign. Lisset is very distressed by her mother, while Emilio suffers a panic attack and remains hidden in his room. On the other hand, Carlos instructs Gema to go find Facundo Nava to help him discover who is threatening his life. Against his will, the former agent accepts and begins the interrogations in an extra official manner since his license plate and license were removed. In Colombia, the mother of the twins prays for her daughters because, despite not having lived with Paola, she always has her present. On the other hand, in Bora Bora, Gonzalo looks for Paola but she is partying and quite drunk. Minutes before Paulina will wake up from the coma, Manuel had tried to kill her with a lethal injection but seeing that he is almost surprised by the president, he quickly saves the syringe. Afterwards, Carlos enters to speak with his wife and she tries to tell him the truth but is too disturbed to see Manuel and the devices begin to sound. Later, Lisset goes to visit her mother and she takes the opportunity to ask for her cell phone and call Colombia, when she does, her boyfriend answers her and Paulina tells him that she is going to stay indefinitely in Mexico. Manuel calls Paola who has reconciled with Gonzalo and warns him that the shot failed and that he has to return immediately to the country.
3	"Paulina intenta escapar"	4 September 2019	18 September 2019	3.3	1.68
In Bora Bora, Gonzalo goes to review the business. There, he faces his partner who claims the one who has a relationship with the President's wife. Both argue strongly and the traffic ends up threatening his partner with a weapon telling him that he is going to donate to Paola. On the other hand, the first royal lady, finds out that her plan failed and gets mad. The only way her lover finds her to calm her down is to throw her into the pool. In Mexico City, we see the impeccable President spending an intimate time with Gema, his campaign advisor. Later, Paulina returns in her role as Paola to the presidential residence. All the servants receive it with an applause except Emilio, who does not vary, is drunk and behaves very rude. Meanwhile, Facundo manages to get a photograph of the sniper who paid attention to Paola. Manuel listens behind the door and decides to find him before he delate them. Later, the former agent goes with the President and tells him that he suspects that his wife has a lover. At night, Manuel prepares to continue his work, and goes to Guillermo's house (the sniper) to kill him, first he ends with his mother and then they face, fortunately Teresa saves him. Later, Paulina managed to convince her nurse that she is not the First Lady, she is about to escape when Carlos is found who frustrates his plans. Meanwhile, Paola asks Gonzalo about his plans to move to Italian Tuscany to escape, when he tells her, she responds with a slap. Then, in Mexico, Paulina tries again to escape, this time, posing as her nurse. In that, Emilio returns home after the club in a rather inconvenient state and the transporters who camp outside the place intercept him. The young man pulls out the gun he just bought and threatens everyone. That sounds alarms and Paulina's plans seem frustrated again.
4	"Estoy sola, siempre sola"	5 September 2019	19 September 2019	3.5	1.59
Paola went far. While drugging Gonzalo, his sister Paulina postpones his escape plans and leaves in defense of Emilio. Gonzalo is gagged and tied in bed while his lover is extremely drugged and lost. The hurting woman confesses that she knows that her thugs are looking for her to get rid of her. On the other hand, Teresa asks Manuel to take her to Mykonos with the money stolen from Guillermo. The guard warns him that they can't touch a peso of that money. Later, Paulina and Emilio enter the house, Carlos attacks his son but his "wife" gets in the middle and defends his stepson. Meanwhile, Paola calls Manuel and calls him incompetent, that enrages the Lord and decides to fulfill Teresa's plans. On the other hand, in Bora Bora, Gonzalo explains to Paola that he was not the one who planned his attack. The trafficker blames Santiago for sending the thugs but his girlfriend doesn't believe him. After everything that happens in the presidential residence, Carlos decides to talk with the transporters. Gema advises him not to do it but he decides to listen to his wife. He also decides that he will run to all his escorts, despite what Pascual thinks. Later, Manuel looks for Paulina and warns him that if he tries to escape again, he will kill his mother. When Paola learns that her sister is playing an excellent role as First Lady, she enrages and attacks Gonzalo, who is shot in the leg. The mad First Lady tries to escape the island without success. On the other hand, Carlos tries to spend more time with Emilio, but the president ruins the moment by suggesting that he be admitted to a rehabilitation clinic. The next day, Paulina confronts the carriers and gives her face on behalf of the government. Carlos watches her surprised and proud while Gema sees her with resentment and bad vibes. Paola's madness reaches the limit and after an argument with Gonzalo, she decides to kill him. Afterwards, he receives a call from the trafficker's pilot, he confirms two places for Tuscany, the disturbed woman realizes what she has just done.
5	"¿Te gustaría que te sedujera?"	6 September 2019	20 September 2019	2.9	1.27
After killing Gonzalo, Paola realizes that he made a mistake. She gets rid of his lover's body by throwing him into the sea. Afterwards, the first lady takes the flight to Mexico but for an emergency she has to land in Cancun. On the other hand, Facundo asks Paulina to go for a walk so she can talk about her lover. She immediately takes her to a place where she can swim and reminds her that they had an adventure. Obviously La usupradora doesn't know what this man is talking about. During the conversation, Paulina tells Facundo that her lover (from the first lady) is Gonzalo Santamarina since Paola's mother confessed to her previously. Meanwhile, Paola returns to the city directly to Gonzalo's house and there, regrets what he did. On the other hand, Gema puts a scene of jealousy at Carlos, for his wife! He decides to focus only on his work as an advisor. In another room, Lisset is traumatized by all the times her mother called her fat. After much thought, he agrees to date a young man he met online. Meanwhile in Colombia, Paulina's mother borrows money to fly to Mexico in search of her daughter. On the other hand, Gema and Paulina face each other since the first lady suspects the relationship that the consultant has with her husband. Later, Lisset's appointment goes well, however, what he does not suspect is that Diego's uncle is manipulating him to approach her. Afterwards, Facundo enters Gonzalo's house to look for evidence that instills him in the attack. Paola hears the noise coming from outside and manages to escape. Facundo runs off trying to reach her but runs into Montse, the first lady's nurse who goes as a spy on her.
6	"Sangre fría"	9 September 2019	23 September 2019	3.2	1.67
Paola is determined to kill Paulina with her own hands. Facundo discovers that Gonzalo is more than just a producer of chocolates.
7	"Deberías estar muerta"	10 September 2019	24 September 2019	3.0	1.57
Paulina helps Lisette look good for her date, which causes Arcadia's suspicions. Paola meets with Paulina at Gonzalo's house to exchange roles, but it is another attempt to kill her.
8	"Perro bien alimentado no muerde la mano"	11 September 2019	25 September 2019	2.9	1.64
Paola meets with Facundo to give him information about the man who wanted to kill her in order to get them out of her way, but Teresa will get ahead of her. Emilio discovers the truth of his mother and Paulina accuses Facundo of betrayal for revealing to Carlos that she has a lover.
9	"Todo se está saliendo de control"	12 September 2019	26 September 2019	3.0	1.64
Paola makes her doctor believe that she is losing control so that Paulina pays the consequences.
10	"Yo no soy Paola... ¿Tú sí me crees?"	13 September 2019	27 September 2019	3.0	1.43
While Paulina is admitted to the psychiatric hospital when she assumes she has a double personality, Paola's plans could collapse with Facundo's discovery about the first lady.
11	"Paola usurpa la vida de Paulina"	16 September 2019	30 September 2019	2.7	1.68
In the middle of the night in the hospital where Paulina is hospitalized, Facundo arrives at the place to try to get her out without anyone noticing, but she realizes that someone else was trying to approach the room where he and Paulina were. On the other hand, Olga, Paulina's mother arrives in Mexico to take Paulina to Colombia, without realizing that she is actually Paola, posing as Paulina. Meanwhile Facundo invents that Paola (Paulina at that time) was tried to kill again, so they reach the conclusion of taking her to a safe place where only he, Carlos and the Commander know where Paola is. And Teresa tells Manuel that Paola died in the accident they both had. On the other hand, Paulina and Facundo begin to know each other more deeply and become good friends.
12	"¡Tenemos que seguir con esta farsa!"	17 September 2019	1 October 2019	2.9	1.56
The close coexistence between Paulina and Facundo causes something more than a friendship to emerge. In Colombia, Paola tries to contact Manuel, but Teresa makes her believe that he is dead. Carlos gives in to the threat of his adversary.
13	"¿Paulina y Paola son hermanas?"	18 September 2019	2 October 2019	3.0	1.55
Facundo will investigate if Paola and Paulina are related. Manuel is devastated by the supposed death of Paulina. Paulina is alarmed to discover that Paola is posing as her. Carlos asks Gema to return to work with him.
14	"Terminar con la hipocresía"	19 September 2019	3 October 2019	2.9	1.75
While Paola sleeps with Paulina's husband and deceives her mother, Paulina looks for a way to go to Colombia. Carlos discovers that Facundo could be altering the evidence of the attack and that he talks secretly with Paulina.
15	"¿Me puedo quedar a dormir?"	20 September 2019	4 October 2019	2.7	1.47
Carlos asks Paulina to let him spend the night with her, which causes surprise at the presidential residence. Paulina is reunited with her mother and asks to be careful with Paola because she has tried several times to end her life.
16	"Escándalo sexual en la casa presidencial"	23 September 2019	7 October 2019	2.9	1.59
Paola questions Facundo if he is in love with her sister, but he assures her that she will pay for the crimes she has committed. Some intimate photos of Lisette are leaked into the internet. Paola manages to trick Olga into convincing Paulina and Facundo to set her free.
17	"Mi gran amor, Paulina"	24 September 2019	8 October 2019	3.1	1.74
Paola demands Manuel to tell her who planned the explosion. Paulina returns to Mexico to help Lisette. Paola is devastated to hear her mother's last words.
18	"No estires mucho la liga porque se puede romper"	25 September 2019	9 October 2019	3.1	1.72
After hearing her mother's last words, Paola explodes with rage and breaks what is in the room. Meanwhile, Paulina suffers a faint due to a bad feeling but when calling Olga, she receives no response. On the other hand, Pascual talks to Carlos as he discovered that Molina (the computer manager) is uncle of Diego, Liss's suitor. They also comment that it is important to recover Pedro to investigate Facundo. Meanwhile, Paola disposes of her mother's assets and pretends that Paulina is about to arrive in Colombia. However, he does not intend to wait for Olga's funeral. Then, he calls Manuel to prevent Paulina from finding out about her mother's death. Facundo arrives with Irene at Gonzalo's house and they begin to investigate. When they start checking the garden, they recover a body. It turns out that he is the sniper who tried to kill Paulina who has been missing for some months. Pedro tells Facundo that the description given by the mother of that person fits perfectly with Manuel's. He also informs him that he has been investigating him and that he discovered that he lives with a woman named Teresa. Both begin to plan how to drop Paola's assistant. Manuel asks Teresa to get an apartment so Paola can come back and be calm. Later, Pacual entrusts Pedro with the first mission in the presidential house: investigate Molina to find out his true intentions. The next day, Emilio falls back into drugs and alcohol thanks to the influence of his friends. He gets so bad that he calls his new friend to go for him. Along the way, the young woman feels bad and stays in the middle of the street. Meanwhile, in Colombia, Tina, Olga's friend gets Paulina's phone and tries to locate her to tell her what is happening.
19	"Necesitamos estar más juntas que nunca"	26 September 2019	10 October 2019	2.9	1.60
After being stranded on the road, Emilio remains unconscious while his girlfriend faints. Upon waking, the young man realizes that she does not react and immediately asks for help. Upon learning of the situation, Carlos and Paulina go directly to the hospital where they are informed that Emilio is totally alcoholized and that they found cocaine in their system. They are also told that Feru, the young woman with whom he was traveling, is serious due to peritonitis. The president strongly rebukes his son and Paulina defends him. On the other hand, Wilson prevents Ernestina from communicating with Paulina and the threat of death. Afterwards, he and Paola get ready to fly to Mexico. Once at the airport, the couple is denied access to the VIP lounge, in that a handsome and wealthy gentleman, offers company to Paola and she leaves Wilson without giving explanations. Meanwhile, Manuel leaves his house quietly when a strong operation arrives and is taken away. Once in the prison, the man manages to bribe the policeman who wants to interrogate him and gives him all the information about why he is there. He also lends her cell phone and calls Teresa for help. Molina looks for Pedro to blackmail him by telling his boss that he is gay. In jail, the lady who was going to testify against Manuel, falsifies her statement since Teresa threatens to kill her granddaughter if she opens her mouth. That forces Facundo to free the lord and is filled with courage. Later, Paola calls her sister to meet and be able to "talk." Upon arriving at the meeting, Paola tells her sister that her mother died. Paulina slaps her but Paola assures her sister that all she wants is for them to be together.
20	"Paulina, ¡te amo!"	27 September 2019	11 October 2019	2.9	1.64
After learning of her mother's death, Paulina attacks Paola, who assures her that nothing had to do with what happened. Also, the evil twin takes the opportunity to ask her to keep the promise they made to her mother: stay together. Paulina gives her sister a vote of confidence and they agree to meet later. Meanwhile, Facundo asks Carlos to take care of Manuel as he suspects that he is the one who has planned and carried out the attacks. Because of that, Carlos orders Pascual to stop Manuel from working for a time in which everything is clarified. Upon leaving that meeting, Facundo meets Paulina and she tells him what happened. Immediately, the former agent suspects Paola. Later, Facundo goes with his friend who is in the police and they begin to investigate in the neighborhood about Manuel's dirty business. There, they meet the criminal who bought the explosives for the attack on Gonzalo Santamarina's house and he confesses that Teresa is the one who asked for them. On the other hand, Paulina confesses everything to Carlos but he does not believe him and thinks he is in crisis again. The Colombian asks her to talk to Facundo and confirm what she says. This is what Carlos does and his friend confesses the whole truth. Afterwards, the president talks to the Usurper and asks him to arrange a meeting with Paola. The moment of truth arrives and Paola, Paulina and Carlos are in a museum. Paulina leaves and Carlos talks to his wife Paola, after discussing for a while, the president confesses that he fell in love with his sister Paulina. Paola, jealous tells him that Paulina has a relationship with Nava. When he returns home, Carlos talks to Paulina and promises that he will always protect her, although that may cost him the presidency. There, he confesses that he loves her.
21	"El principal objetivo"	30 September 2019	14 October 2019	3.0	1.76
Paulina puts Facundo and Carlos in a predicament. After declaring his love for Paulina, Carlos realizes that she doesn't feel the same. She immediately asks if she loves Facundo but the Colombian doesn't know who she is. Then, he asks her not to do anything against her sister and to have her undergo psychiatric treatment. Later, Pedro and his boyfriend fight since he was not able to tell his father about his sexual preferences. Meanwhile, Pascual informs Manuel that he is no longer going to work in the presidency and despite his pleas, an agent escorts him for his belongings. On the other hand, Carlos and Facundo meet to talk about Manuel. Afterwards, the former agent informs the president that he is about to imprison Paola. Carlos asks his friend not to do it since Paulina asked him to take care of his sister. That causes them to face each other since Facundo assures his friend that he is to take care of Paulina, asks him not to get into their relationship. Then, he goes to find his beloved and Carlos's mother sees them kissing in the elevator. Montse asks Paulina who she is going to stay with. She tells him that she doesn't know what to answer and assures that the two are very different. Meanwhile, Wilson takes Arcadia with Paola and she confesses that her twin sister is the one who is taking her place. The evil twin asks her mother for help in exchange for a large sum of money. Meanwhile, Pascual quotes Pedro and there, the young man informs him of the truth about Molina and Diego, confesses that he hid the information since the systems chief threatened to disclose that he is homosexual. Afterwards, Molina confesses everything and Liss agrees to talk to Diego, but only to tell him that he will no longer trust him. Later, Wilson agrees to meet Paulina and tries to set him up, a hooded man arrives and kidnaps the young woman by shooting her companion.
22	"Una de las dos tiene que morir"	1 October 2019	15 October 2019	3.1	1.77
After Paulina was kidnapped, the news comes to the presidency and generates great chaos. Everyone starts looking for her and Carlos calls Facundo, when the former agent finds out that his beloved disappeared, he looks for Manuel. Meanwhile, Manuel has Paulina tied up on a mat. The young woman begs him for his life but the lord is loyal to Paola. Afterwards, Facundo receives a call informing him that they may have found a clue. Upon arriving at the place, it turns out that it is a trap, however, there they receive another clue. On the other hand, in the theater, Paola gets to see her sister and tortures telling her that her mother didn't think about her before she died. He also claims that his life has been stolen and points him with a gun. Before he can shoot, Teresa arrives and they are made of words. Then, Nava and his men arrive at the theater but find only the empty mat with a large blood stain. When going out to look, Facundo meets Paulina sitting on some stairs, the Woman says that Teresa killed Paola. lLater, Paulina is welcomed by her family at home and everyone is very happy to see her. Then they leave her alone in her room and removes a wig to reveal that it is Paola. In that, Arcadia arrives to celebrate with her daughter and they both discuss her plan to empty the bank accounts and run away. On the other hand, Paulina is alive but Teresa has kidnapped her and tries to request a millionaire rescue to be able to flee along with her minions. Manuel is not with her, he remains faithful to Paola who demands that he find his sister to finish once and for all. Later, Montse enters Paola's room and she yells out of the wave, it gets even more confused when Arcadia arrives with ice and alcohol. Afterwards, the nurse sets him a trap and there, confirms that it is Paola.
23	"Su muerte es mi vida"	2 October 2019	16 October 2019	3.4	1.71
Montse desperately leaves the presidential residence and tries to communicate with Nava to tell him what is happening. Meanwhile, Paola is enraged that she cannot transfer the money and will need to go to the bank personally. For that, try to convince Liss to go shopping. Then, talk to Manuel to tell him that he gave Montse permission to go with his son. In that, Manuel assures him that the nurse has no children. Paola tries desperately to get Montse's address and sends Manuel to end her. He locates the nurse and threatens her until in despair he shoots her. Meanwhile, Paulina tries to convince her kidnappers to release her and offers them a large sum of money to let her go. Everyone refuses, but one feels tempted and accepts the deal. Later, Teresa and Manuel meet only to discuss and say goodbye forever. On the other hand, Juana tells Piedad that she suspects Paola changed again. Arcadia listens to everything behind the door and asks her daughter to hurry since everyone is suspecting her. Afterwards and to make matters worse, Facundo comes to talk with his lover and confesses that they are about to confirm Gonzalo's murder. That alters the first lady too much. While the analyzes of the scene in the theater are carried out, Facundo realizes that Paola is not dead. On the other hand, Paulina manages to escape with the help of one of Teresa's men. Unfortunately, the woman finds them and kills the traitor. Later, Facundo goes to Montse's house but finds her dead. When giving the news to Paola, she pretends that she cares but Facundo realizes that something strange happens there. Paola receives Carlos and assures her that her friend Nava is still looking for her despite her rejections. Carlos wants to claim him immediately but Paola suggests that he be permanently removed from the investigation.
24	"El rescate de Paulina"	3 October 2019	17 October 2019	3.4	1.74
After feeling discovered, Paola escapes along with Arcadia. Piedad confesses to his son that he suspects that the evil twin is back, in that, Facundo calls his friend to tell him the same. Meanwhile, Paola and her mother run away in a taxi. When Manuel arrives at his apartment, he is talking to one of Teresa's men. Paola sees him as an opportunity to find his sister but his plan fails. On the other hand, Pedro calls Osvaldo to tell him that he loves him and that I already talk to Pascual, however he still does not tell his father and that bothers his boyfriend. Later, Teresa speaks with Carlos and asks for five million dollars in exchange for Paulina, Facundo and Pascual decide to track the call and go in search of Paulina. Upon arriving at the place, Teresa realizes that they were discovered and feels cornered. He decides to call Carlos and demands that they make a personal exchange. Despite Facundo's refusal, the president goes for his wife. At the time of the rescue, everything gets out of control and they kill all of Teresa's men, the woman shoots Carlos and Paulina but Baca goes through being injured. Later, Paulina confesses the truth to Liss and Emilio, the girl becomes enraged and shouts at them that she hates them. Later, Paulina tries to talk to Liss but she rejects her and assures her that she is a monster. The young woman leaves the room slamming the door. Later, Paola, in desperation, goes to look for Camilo, the man he met at the airport. In trying to seduce him, a mature woman makes her realize that Camilo is a starving man she maintains. The next day, Manuel arrives with the news of what happened to Teresa, Arcadia suggests Paola use Liss to escape the country. Immediately, the evil woman calls her daughter to brainwash and speaks ill of Paulina. Both agree to see each other later. Guest stars: Claudia Ramírez
25	"Ponte a mi altura"	4 October 2019	18 October 2019	3.6	1.83
Paola extorts Paulina for money. Manuel gives his life to save Paola and she, being surrounded by the police, chooses to commit suicide to be a free woman. Carlos resigns from the presidency to live his life with Paulina.

== Ratings ==
=== Mexico ratings ===
Viewership and ratings per season of La usurpadora
Season	Episodes	First aired		Last aired		Avg. viewers (millions)
Season	Episodes	Date	Viewers (millions)	Date	Viewers (millions)	Avg. viewers (millions)
1	25	2 September 2019	3.9	4 October 2019	3.6	3.11

=== U.S. ratings ===
Viewership and ratings per season of La usurpadora
Season	Timeslot (ET)	Episodes	First aired		Last aired		Avg. viewers (millions)
Season	Timeslot (ET)	Episodes	Date	Viewers (millions)	Date	Viewers (millions)	Avg. viewers (millions)
1	Mon–Fri 9pm	25	16 September 2019	1.75	18 October 2019	1.83	1.65

== Awards and nominations ==
Year	Award	Category	Nominated	Result	Ref.
2020	TVyNovelas Awards	Best Telenovela of the Year	Carmen Armendáriz	Won	
2020	TVyNovelas Awards	Best Actress	Sandra Echeverría	Won	
2020	TVyNovelas Awards	Best Actor	Andrés Palacios	Nominated	
2020	TVyNovelas Awards	Best Antagonist Actress	Sandra Echeverría	Won	
2020	TVyNovelas Awards	Best Leading Actress	Queta Lavat	Nominated	
2020	TVyNovelas Awards	Best Leading Actor	Juan Carlos Barreto	Nominated	
2020	TVyNovelas Awards	Best Co-lead Actress	Ana Bertha Espín	Nominated	
2020	TVyNovelas Awards	Best Co-lead Actor	Arap Bethke	Won	
2020	TVyNovelas Awards	Best Direction	Francisco Franco Alba	Won	
2020	TVyNovelas Awards	Best Direction of the Cameras	Vivián Sánchez Ross	Won	
2020	TVyNovelas Awards	Best Original Story or Adaptation	Larissa Andrade, Tania Tinajero, Zaria Abreu and Fernando Abrego	Won	
2020	Los Favoritos del Público	Favorite Slap	Paulina a Paola (Sandra Echeverría)	Nominated	
2020	Los Favoritos del Público	The Most Handsome Villain	Arap Bethke	Nominated	
2020	Los Favoritos del Público	The Most Beautiful Women	Sandra Echeverría	Nominated	
2020	Los Favoritos del Público	The Most Handsome Guy	Andrés Palacios	Nominated	
2020	Los Favoritos del Público	The Most Beautiful Smile	Andrés Palacios	Nominated	
2020	Los Favoritos del Público	The Most Beautiful Smile	Sandra Echeverría	Nominated	
2020	Los Favoritos del Público	Favorite Couple	Sandra Echeverría y Andrés Palacios	Nominated	
2020	Los Favoritos del Público	The Most Beautiful Leading Actor	Juan Carlos Barreto	Nominated	
2020	Los Favoritos del Público	Best Cast	Carmen Armendáriz	Nominated	
2020	Los Favoritos del Público	Favorite Finale	Carmen Armendáriz	Nominated	
