= The Club (Mexican TV series) =

Mexican crime drama television series

- Genre: Crime drama
- Directed by: Camila Ibarra
- Starring: Alejandro Speitzer; Minnie West; Jorge Caballero
- Country of origin: Mexico
- Original language: Spanish
- No. of seasons: 1
- No. of episodes: 25

Production
- Production company: Argos Comunicación

Original release
- Network: Netflix
- Release: 15 November 2019

The Club (Spanish: El Club), is Mexican crime drama television series directed by Camila Ibarra and produced by Argos Comunicación. The series revolves around a group of rich young people who get involved, through an application, in drug trafficking until they get to have contact with much more powerful people and that's when they get into serious problems. It stars Alejandro Speitzer, Minnie West, and Jorge Caballero.

== Cast ==
- Alejandro Speitzer as Pablo Caballero
- Minnie West as Sofía
- Jorge Caballero as Matías
- Ana Gonzalez Bello as Ana Pau
- Axel Arenas as Jonás
- Arcelia Ramírez as María
- Alejandro Puente as Santiago Caballero
- Juan Ríos as Monkey
- Martín Saracho as Max
- Vicente Tamayo as Nicolás Farah
- Aurora Gil as Lola
- Omar Germenos as Lázaro Caballero
- Estrella Solís as Penélope / Polly
- Martha Julia as Regina Caballero
- Ignacio Tahhan as Gonzalo Cisneros
- Marco Antonio Tostado as Diego

== Episodes ==
=== Season 1 (2019) ===
| No. | Title | Directed by | Written by | Original release date |
|---|---|---|---|---|
| 1 | "MDMA y malas ideas" | Raúl Caballero Camila Ibarra Agustin Ortiz | Camila Ibarra | 15 November 2019 |
Pablo risks it all by launching Meet, a dating app, with a spectacular party. But the party's biggest hit turns out to be something else altogether.
| 2 | "Misión complicada" | Raúl Caballero Camila Ibarra Agustin Ortiz | Camila Ibarra | 15 November 2019 |
Pablo realizes the quickest way to get what he wants out of life is to sell MDMA. To that end, he recruits a team of misfits as dealers.
| 3 | "MAM Hadas" | Raúl Caballero Camila Ibarra Agustin Ortiz | María Hinojos | 15 November 2019 |
The team convene a focus group to determine their strategy. Pablo's brother, Santiago, has an insightful night before he leaves for Stanford
| 4 | "Monkey Business" | Raúl Caballero Camila Ibarra Agustin Ortiz | Camila Ibarra | 15 November 2019 |
Things get complicated for Pablo and the team when dealer El Monkey, whose turf they've inadvertently stepped on, brings them in for a chat.
| 5 | "Mera coincidencia" | Raúl Caballero Camila Ibarra Agustin Ortiz | Camila Ibarra | 15 November 2019 |
Pablo and Sofía go on a wild sales spree while Jonás, beaten up by El Monkey's men, hides with Ana Pau in the apartment her future in-laws bought her.
| 6 | "Meditación y me-la-pelas" | Raúl Caballero Camila Ibarra Agustin Ortiz | María Hinojos | 15 November 2019 |
Pablo disappears, leaving Sofía and Matías to their own devices -- until they run out of merchandise and can't get anymore without Pablo's help.
| 7 | "Malparido" | Raúl Caballero Camila Ibarra Agustin Ortiz | Camila Ibarra | 15 November 2019 |
Sofía decides to end things with Pablo while Matías hooks up with Lorena through Meet. In the meantime, Santiago finds love at Stanford.
| 8 | "Mentiras, mierda y cámaras de seguridad" | Raúl Caballero Camila Ibarra Agustin Ortiz | María Hinojos | 15 November 2019 |
When consequences from the theft of El Monkey's phone catch up to Matías, everyone comes to the rescue, including Diego, Sofía's new lawyer boyfriend.
| 9 | "Miedos, Matías, manjares" | Raúl Caballero Camila Ibarra Agustin Ortiz | María Hinojos | 15 November 2019 |
After his ordeal, Matías feels aimless and lost, and all he wants is to be with Lorena. As the business grows, Diego gets a promotion.
| 10 | "Marcha nupcial y fúnebre" | Raúl Caballero Camila Ibarra Agustin Ortiz | Camila Ibarra | 15 November 2019 |
Ana Pau's wedding turns into an MDMA bacchanal, as the team competes to see who sells the most. Pablo and Sofía argue. Matías's loyalties are split.
| 11 | "Mamá, soy Jonás. Ya no haré travesuras" | Raúl Caballero Camila Ibarra Agustin Ortiz | Camila Ibarra | 15 November 2019 |
When Jonás goes to pick up merchandise, all hell breaks loose and the business's very foundation is threatened. María expands her network.
| 12 | "Mira cómo beben" | Raúl Caballero Camila Ibarra Agustin Ortiz | María Hinojos | 15 November 2019 |
Lorena spins out of control, the team grows desperate for more merchandise, and Nico publicly humiliates Santiago, which makes Pablo seek revenge.
| 13 | "Mar adentro, ¿la vida es más sabrosa?" | Unknown | Unknown | 15 November 2019 |
| 14 | "Margarita, qué lástima" | Unknown | Unknown | 15 November 2019 |
| 15 | "Mientras Sofía no está" | Unknown | Unknown | 15 November 2019 |
| 16 | "Missing My Milliones" | Unknown | Unknown | 15 November 2019 |
| 17 | "Mercancía defectuosa" | Unknown | Unknown | 15 November 2019 |
| 18 | "Miss Errores" | Unknown | Unknown | 15 November 2019 |
| 19 | "Mentiras piadosas" | Unknown | Unknown | 15 November 2019 |
| 20 | "Me muero de ganas" | Unknown | Unknown | 15 November 2019 |
| 21 | "Mala mente" | Unknown | Unknown | 15 November 2019 |
| 22 | "Mami, tumba la casa" | Unknown | Unknown | 15 November 2019 |
| 23 | "Monstruosamente, Pablo" | Unknown | Unknown | 15 November 2019 |
| 24 | "Miss u, Burbujitas" | Unknown | Unknown | 15 November 2019 |
| 25 | "Muchas gracias, siguiente" | Unknown | Unknown | 15 November 2019 |
