= Los ricos también lloran (2022 TV series) =

Mexican telenovela

- Genre: Telenovela
- Based on: Los ricos también lloran by Inés Rodena
- Developed by: Esther Feldman; Rosa Salazar Arenas
- Written by: Marisel Lloberas; Fermín Zúñiga; Daniela Richer
- Directed by: Luis Manzo; Pavel Vázquez; Carlos Santos
- Starring: Sebastián Rulli; Claudia Martín; Fabiola Guajardo; Azela Robinson; Alejandra Barros; Víctor González
- Theme music composer: J. Eduardo Murguía; Mauricio L. Arriaga
- Opening theme: "Me reviviste" by Cristian Castro and Lucero
- Composers: Jaime Vargas; Jorge Tena Martínez Vara; Carlos Páramo; Óskar Gritten; Álvaro Trespalacios
- Country of origin: Mexico
- Original language: Spanish
- No. of seasons: 1
- No. of episodes: 60

Production
- Executive producer: Carlos Bardasano
- Producer: Marycruz Castañón Barajas
- Editor: Alba Merchán Hamann
- Production companies: TelevisaUnivision; W Studios

Original release
- Network: Las Estrellas
- Release: 21 February – 13 May 2022

Los ricos también lloran (English: The Rich Also Cry) is a Mexican television series produced by W Studios for TelevisaUnivision. It aired on Las Estrellas from 21 February 2022 to 13 May 2022. It is a reboot based on the 1979 Mexican telenovela of the same name, and the fourth production of the Fábrica de sueños franchise. The series stars Sebastián Rulli and Claudia Martín.

== Plot ==
Mariana (Claudia Martín) is a poor young woman who is left alone in the world and must make her way in life. When she saves the life of Alberto Salvatierra (Guillermo García Cantú), in gratitude he takes her to his house where she meets Luis Alberto Salvatierra (Sebastián Rulli) and they fall deeply in love. To carry on their relationship, Mariana will have to overcome obstacles of social class, education and traumas while being surrounded by ambitions and betrayals. When Mariana and Luis Alberto are able to realize their love, life will bring them a tragedy: the kidnapping of their son.

== Cast ==
=== Main ===
- Sebastián Rulli as Luis Alberto Salvatierra
- Claudia Martín as Mariana Villarreal
- Fabiola Guajardo as Soraya Montenegro
- Azela Robinson as Elena Suárez
- Alejandra Barros as Daniela Montesinos
- Víctor González as León Alfaro
- Lorena Graniewicz as Britny Chantal Domínguez
- Diego Klein as Santiago Hinojosa
- Arturo Barba as Víctor Millán
- Rubén Sanz as Uriel López
- Thali García as Sofía Mandujano
- Antonio Fortier as Felipe Castillo
- José Luis Franco as Commander Eduardo Becerra
- Mimi Morales as Guadalupe Morales
- Mario Morán as Diego Fernández
- Michelle Jurado as Patricia Luna Castillo
- Dobrina Cristeva as Socorro "Coco" Buendía
- Paola Toyos as Matilde Vélez
- Erik Díaz as Polo Hernández
- Axel Alcántara as Jhony Domínguez
- Sergio Reynoso as Ramíro Domínguez
- Henry Zakka as Father Guillermo
- Dalilah Polanco as Chabela Pérez
- Guillermo García Cantú as Alberto Salvatierra

=== Recurring and guest stars ===
- Luis Gatica as Osvaldo Valdivia
- Darío Ripoll as Gregorio
- Arturo Carmona as Pedro Villareal García
- Rodolfo Arias as Dr. Murillo
- Irineo Álvarez as Alfonso Romano
- Lupita Lara as Nana Trini
- Fernando Banda as Casero
- Carlos Moreno Cravioto as Márquez
- Ricky Gutiérrez as Jesús Camargo
- Paulina de Alba as Constanza
- Pamela Barri as Lizzy
- Sahit Sosa as Jaime
- Carla Suescun as Nayelli
- Héctor Salas as Matías Salvatierra Suárez
- Carlos Gatica as Emilio Campos
- Arturo García Tenorio as Javier
- Darwin as Toribio
- Andy Lo as Maikel Redondo
- Ariel López Padilla as Efraín Torres
- Claudia Silva as Naty
- César Valdivia as Manuel
- Ian Monterrubio as Edgar Castillo Luna
- Alexa Ordaz as Montse
- Hugo Catalán as Carlos
- Carilú Navarro as Chole
- Sachi Tamashiro as Dr. Altamira
- Valentina Delfín Cervantes as Julieta Fernández
- René Martínez as Forense
- María Fernanda García as Sandra
- León Peraza as Rafael Montenegro
- Cirilo Santiago Pérez as Salvador
- Víctor Baez as Marito
- Mayra Rojas as Yolanda
- Natasha Domínguez as Tamara
- Agustín Arana as Dr. Stramesi
- Sabrina Seara as Vivian
- Andrés Baida as Alberto "Betito" Salvatierra Villarreal / Tomás "Tomasito" Verón Ortega
- Estefi Merelles as Roberta Millan
- Israel Salmer as José Verón
- Magali Boysselle as Rita Ortega de Verón

== Production ==
In October 2018 the series was announced to be part of the Fábrica de sueños. In May 2021 the series was presented during the Univision upfront for the 2021–2022 television season. Filming began on 20 September 2021, the cast was announced on the same day. Filming ended on 2 March 2022.

== Episodes ==
| No. | Title | Mexico air date | U.S. air date | Mexico viewers (millions) | U.S. viewers (millions) |
|---|---|---|---|---|---|
| 1 | "La boca del lobo" | 21 February 2022 (Note: Premiered early online through Las Estrellas website on 18 February 2022.) | 6 September 2022 | 4.1 | 1.43 |
Alberto, seeing that his son is not a man dedicated to the company's business, reproaches him for his lack of commitment. Mariana is threatened with eviction for not paying the rent and asks father Guillermo for help. Mariana arrives to meet with Alfonso Romano who tries to get out of line with her, but she puts a stop to him. Luis Alberto has a confrontation with his father causing him to feel sick. Alberto arrives at the neighborhood where Mariana is living to thank her for saving his life and when he sees that she has been left without a house he offers her his home. Mariana and her dog, Pulgoso, arrive at the Salvatierra mansion and meet Luis Alberto.
| 2 | "Destruyes todo lo que tocas" | 22 February 2022 | 6 September 2022 | 4.2 | 1.43 |
Mariana sees Luis Alberto's attitude and it becomes clear to her that he is a man of few manners. León is ready to finish off Alberto after staying with Daniela. Mariana continues to get to know the Salvatierra family. Soraya arrives at the Salvatierra mansion and meets Mariana, Luis Alberto informs her that she had saved his father. Daniela makes it clear that she is upset that Mariana is living with them. Alberto learns what Alfonso Romano did to Mariana. Daniela finds out that Mariana, besides living in the house, is also going to work in the presidency of the company and demands Alberto to get rid of her. When Alberto learns of his son's intentions, he asks him to stay away from Mariana.
| 3 | "Sacar las uñas" | 23 February 2022 | 7 September 2022 | 3.8 | 1.19 |
León and Soraya are ready to destroy the Salvatiera family. Mariana feels uncomfortable in the mansion because of Daniela's attitude. Luis Alberto falls into Osvaldo and León’s trap again. Soraya assures Elena that if Mariana becomes fixated on Luis Alberto she is capable of destroying her. Alberto, upon learning that his son contradicted his orders, publicly humiliates him and Elena comes to his defense. Luis Alberto pretends to be a chauffeur to accompany Mariana to buy clothes and does not hesitate to surprise her by giving her a dress. Luis Alberto arrives on Mariana's arm to Soraya's event.
| 4 | "Una princesa de cuento de hadas" | 24 February 2022 | 8 September 2022 | 4.5 | 1.19 |
Soraya complains to Luis Alberto for arriving at her event on Mariana's arm, he makes it clear to her that he is a free man, Soraya in revenge, pays to get Mariana drunk. Elena names Luis Alberto as the leader of the company's new campaign. Polo proposes to Britney. Mariana listens as Soraya swears revenge on her. León assures Elena that Mariana's arrival will change everything. Mariana discovers that Alberto's van has a bomb.
| 5 | "Nunca te voy a dejar ir" | 25 February 2022 | 9 September 2022 | 4.3 | 1.29 |
Daniela tells Alberto that to be more sure that Mariana is not his daughter, she wants him to do a DNA test. León is willing to destroy Luis Alberto and his father. Mariana explains to Luis Alberto and Santiago that both she and Alberto almost died after the van caught fire. Soraya gets angry when she sees that Mariana was in the newspaper with Luis Alberto. Soraya warns Mariana that Luis Alberto belongs to her and asks her not to mess with him because she doesn't know what she is capable of, Mariana is not afraid of her threats. Luis Alberto asks Mariana for an explanation about the accident, she tries to get out of the way, but he kisses her.
| 6 | "La duda ya está sembrada" | 28 February 2022 | 12 September 2022 | 4.0 | 1.34 |
Mariana slaps Luis Alberto after he steals a kiss from her. Britney talks to Polo and confesses that she doesn't want to get married. Becerra finds evidence against Luis Alberto. Daniela wants to give Mariana money to go away from her family, she feels offended. Alberto takes a DNA test to prove to his wife that Mariana is not his daughter. León is already preparing another attack on the Salvatierra family. Alberto has a fierce fight with his son because he thinks he wanted to kill him, so he slaps him. Soraya informs Luis Alberto that she is expecting his child and Mariana hears the news.
| 7 | "Todo se arregla con dinero" | 1 March 2022 | 13 September 2022 | 3.8 | 1.26 |
The DNA test proves to Daniela that Mariana is not Alberto's daughter and she seeks Mariana’s forgiveness, Alberto is upset to see that his wife did not trust his word. Luis Alberto asks Soraya if she is sure about the pregnancy. Osvaldo hopes that Alberto will stop the investigation. Soraya is willing to sustain the pregnancy lie with León's help. Elena is sure that there are many people who want Alberto dead. Patricia discovers that Soraya stole her pregnancy test, Soraya offers her money to terminate her pregnancy. Luis Alberto complains to Mariana for hiding the bomb situation from him. Soraya informs Elena that she is expecting Luis Alberto's child so she gets excited and asks her to organize the wedding. Luis Alberto gets locked up with Mariana because of Pulgoso.
| 8 | "Ya me enamoré de él" | 2 March 2022 | 15 September 2022 | 4.0 | 1.28 |
Mariana suffers a crisis and Luis Alberto manages to calm her down by dancing to her favorite song, she sees that he is not a bad person and tells him that with the death of her godmother she was left alone in the world. Mariana assures Alberto that his son is a good person and makes a request. Alberto and Elena meet at the cemetery and both remember how well their children got along. Matilde inquires about Mariana. Mariana confesses to Britney that she fell in love with Luis Alberto, but nothing can exist between them since he is soon to become a father. Luis Alberto takes Soraya to the hospital so that the doctor can perform an ultrasound.
| 9 | "Los latidos del bebé" | 3 March 2022 | 16 September 2022 | 4.4 | 1.30 |
Soraya fakes a fainting spell so that the doctor will not check her and discover her lie. Luis Alberto informs his mother that he asked for a loan and as collateral he gave his shares in the company. Mariana offers an apology to Daniela for the comment she made at the meeting. Daniela confesses to Mariana that she performed a DNA test on her because she thought she was Alberto's daughter, for which she offers an apology and welcomes her home. Soraya asks Patricia not to reveal anything about her pregnancy until she gets engaged to Luis Alberto. Soraya, in order to continue with her plan, pays a doctor to show Luis Alberto a fake ultrasound; he is thrilled to hear his baby's heart. Trini realizes that Luis Alberto is in love with Mariana. Oscar calls León's cell phone, but Luis Alberto answers.
| 10 | "Cambió mi suerte" | 4 March 2022 | 19 September 2022 | 3.8 | 1.13 |
Santiago does not want Emilio to discover that he is a Salvatierra and asks Britney for a favor. León assures Luis Alberto that he has started to pay his gambling debts and for that reason he has communication with Osvaldo. Patricia confesses to her husband that Soraya threatened her if she reveals that she is pregnant. Becerra is sure that Luis Alberto is innocent. Felipe lets Luis Alberto know that Soraya is not pregnant and that Patricia is the one who is really expecting a baby. Alberto resorts to the help of a pill in order to be with his wife Daniela.
| 11 | "Libre para amar" | 7 March 2022 | 20 September 2022 | 4.4 | 1.25 |
Becerra informs Luis Alberto that Soraya is not pregnant, she accepts that she lied for fear of losing him. Luis Alberto confesses to Mariana that he is in love with her, when she hears this, she kisses him. Soraya is ready to take revenge on Luis Alberto and warns that she will not let Mariana have her way. Luis Alberto is beaten by a group of delinquents who argue that he must pay his debt. Elena learns that Soraya is not pregnant. Mariana manages to pass her exam.
| 12 | "Tu vida pende de un hilo" | 8 March 2022 | 22 September 2022 | 4.3 | 1.02 |
Mariana worries that Luis Alberto has not arrived for her and calls him. Luis Alberto is assaulted and threatened on his way to pick up Mariana. He is warned that he better pay his debt or face the consequences. Soraya confesses to León that the pregnancy problem will not get in the way of her plans to marry Luis Alberto. Luis Alberto arrives at the house at night and is afraid to talk to Mariana. Osvaldo tells León that Manuel's body has been found and plans have gone as planned. Luis Alberto arrives for breakfast, and everyone is worried to see how he looks, Alberto suspects that he is still gambling, and they argue. Osvaldo calls Luis Alberto and warns him to pay his debt. Luis Alberto realizes that his father canceled all his credit cards. Luis Alberto asks Uriel for a loan to pay off his debt; Mariana overhears them. Soraya assures Patricia that now that she betrayed her she will make her life a living hell and tries to run over Felipe. Mariana follows Luis Alberto to the casino. Osvaldo convinces Luis Alberto to gamble again. Despite his promises, Mariana finds Luis Alberto gambling.
| 13 | "Aterrizaje de emergencia" | 9 March 2022 | 23 September 2022 | 3.9 | 1.23 |
Luis Alberto confesses to Mariana his addiction to gambling so she is willing to help him, he vows to become a better man because of the great love he has for her. Felipe is convinced that Soraya tried to run him over. León asks to investigate Mariana's origin. Santiago learns about the company's mismanagement. Alberto learns that the helicopter where Luis Alberto and Mariana were traveling disappeared from the radar, the pilot makes an emergency landing saving everyone's lives. Mariana and Luis Alberto find a cabin to take shelter and sleep together.
| 14 | "La tragedia cambió nuestras vidas" | 10 March 2022 | 26 September 2022 | 4.2 | 1.27 |
Alberto is upset with León for his ineptitude. Luis Alberto reveals to Mariana his painful past and shares that he feels guilty about the death of his brother Matías. Britney informs her family that Mariana was also on the helicopter reported missing. Soraya pretends to be in pain for not hearing from Luis Alberto. Luis Alberto returns with Mariana to the Salvatierra mansion and when questioned by the press about the accident he reveals that both he and his girlfriend were unharmed, Soraya cannot believe the news. León confirms that Mariana's father was a victim of Luis Alberto's bad business dealings.
| 15 | "Una mujer despechada" | 11 March 2022 | 26 September 2022 | 4.0 | 1.27 |
León assures Soraya that he has the perfect plan to get Mariana out of her way. Alberto asks his son not to play with Mariana's feelings because she is a good woman. Soraya enlists Yolanda's help to cast a spell to get Luis Alberto to stay by her side. Mariana is happy to see that her co-workers cared for her. Luis Alberto apologizes to Soraya for the way he announced his relationship with Mariana, she gives him a hug and places the amulet that Yolanda gave her. Mariana finds some documents that prove that Luis Alberto had something to do with her father's death.
| 16 | "Mi papá se mató por tu culpa" | 14 March 2022 | 28 September 2022 | N/A | 1.18 |
Mariana proves that Luis Alberto is responsible for her father's death. Luis Alberto assures Elena that he wants to marry Mariana. Santiago and Britney are about to kiss. León suggests to Soraya to prepare for her wedding with Luis Alberto. Britney advises Mariana to investigate what happened with the sale of her father's company. Mariana wants Sandra to confess what really happened with her father's factory. Mariana confronts Luis Alberto when she learns the truth.
| 17 | "Tú y yo ya no somos nada" | 15 March 2022 | 28 September 2022 | N/A | 1.18 |
Luis Alberto is ready to confront Sandra. Soraya is happy that the amulet that Yolanda sold her is working with Luis Alberto. Luis Alberto assures Mariana that Sandra is lying, but she doesn't believe him and breaks up with him. Elena believes that someone is doing witchcraft to Luis Alberto. Luis Alberto assures his mother that his bad decisions in the past led him to lose Mariana. Alberto asks his son to explain what happened with the purchase of the factory. Britney confesses her feelings to Santiago. Luis Alberto decides to leave the Salvatierra mansion.
| 18 | "Mi momento ha llegado" | 16 March 2022 | 29 September 2022 | N/A | 1.25 |
Alberto and Daniela beg Mariana not to leave the house. Santiago asks Britney to remain friends. Alberto asks Becerra to take care of Luis Alberto. Mariana confesses to Father Guillermo that she regrets having fallen in love with Luis Alberto, he advises her not to judge Luis Alberto. Soraya learns that Luis Alberto left the Salvatierra mansion. Alberto begins to feel bad after finding out that Luis Alberto asked Uriel for a large sum of money. Soraya brags to Mariana that she spent the night with Luis Alberto.
| 19 | "Esto es lo que soy" | 17 March 2022 | 29 September 2022 | N/A | 1.25 |
Mariana verifies that Luis Alberto was with Soraya. León wants to know Alberto's medical records. Patricia gets angry with her daughter Monse and Felipe does not confess to her that he lost his job. Elena, seeing that her son is having a hard time, assures him that the only woman who is worth it is Soraya. Mariana assures Soraya that both she and Luis Alberto are made for each other.
| 20 | "Hay cosas que no se pueden perdonar" | 18 March 2022 | 30 September 2022 | N/A | 1.19 |
Soraya blames Mariana for everything that has happened to Luis Alberto, Alberto defends Mariana. Jhony warns Santiago to stay away from Britney. Mariana is not willing to forgive Luis Alberto. Britney apologizes to Santiago for Jhony and they accidentally kiss. Murillo warns Alberto that it's time to tell Daniela about his health condition, he refuses. Alberto seeks Elena to talk about admitting Luis Alberto to a rehab clinic, she refuses and León overhears them. Luis Alberto sneaks out of the house to buy an engagement ring and asks Mariana to marry him but she rejects him. Daniela confronts Alberto about his illness. Luis Alberto asks Soraya to marry him and she accepts.
| 21 | "Un novio embrujado" | 21 March 2022 | 30 September 2022 | 3.3 | 1.19 |
Mariana is convinced that Luis Alberto is only marrying Soraya out of spite. Alberto asks his son to reconsider the idea of marrying Soraya. Mariana reveals to Soraya that Luis Alberto asked her to marry him. Soraya swears to Patricia that now that she marries Luis Alberto she will be fired from the company. Sandra reveals to Mariana that Luis Alberto is not the person who deceived her father. Britney confesses to Polo that she doesn't love him. Alberto asks Mariana not to leave the house.
| 22 | "Es inocente" | 22 March 2022 | 3 October 2022 | 3.0 | 1.23 |
Sandra confesses to Mariana that she is being threatened and needs three thousand dollars to leave the country. Ramiro gets upset with Britney when he finds out that she broke up with Polo. Soraya asks Luis Alberto for a little compassion. Mariana tells Alberto what happened with Sandra. Luis Alberto continues with his nightmares and tries to take Soraya's medicine. Mariana seeks more details about what happened and contacts Sandra, who reiterates that Luis Alberto is innocent. Mariana gives the money to Sandra and she gives her the phone number of the man who hired her to lie to her. Mariana apologizes to Luis Alberto.
| 23 | "Algo se rompió entre nosotros" | 23 March 2022 | 3 October 2022 | 3.5 | 1.23 |
Luis Alberto gets upset with Mariana for believing a lie and assures her that Soraya would not have betrayed him. Soraya shows Alberto the recording where Patricia speaks ill of her. Luis Alberto asks Mariana if there is another man who wants to hurt her. Sandra informs Mariana that she has a photo of the man who deceived her father, she asks Luis Alberto to accompany her. Soraya is unable to locate Luis Alberto and there is not much time left before their engagement party begins.
| 24 | "¡Maldita marginal!" | 24 March 2022 | 4 October 2022 | 3.1 | 1.43 |
Mariana reveals to Luis Alberto that it hurts her that he is marrying Soraya and reiterates that she still loves him, Luis Alberto kisses her. Diego confesses to Guadalupe that he betrayed Patricia. Luis Alberto assures Soraya that he is not in love with her and cancels their engagement. Alberto confronts his son for what he did to Soraya, but Mariana reveals what really happened. Soraya manages to enter Mariana's room and discovers that she has the same doll that her father gave her when she was a little girl, and remembers her past.
| 25 | "Un amor de película" | 25 March 2022 | 4 October 2022 | 2.9 | 1.43 |
Alberto asks León not to make excuses for the investigation. Diego reveals his betrayal to Patricia. Luis Alberto decides not to bet anymore, but Mariana makes a request. Elena complains to Luis Alberto about the humiliation he put Soraya through and assures him that Mariana is siding with his enemies. León will not allow Luis Alberto to win the bidding. León makes Alberto believe that Alfonso is the culprit so Mariana and Luis Alberto look for him in order to confront him. Luis Alberto proposes to Mariana.
| 26 | "Coincidencia genética" | 28 March 2022 | 5 October 2022 | 3.1 | 1.30 |
Mariana says yes to Luis Alberto's marriage proposal. Jhony threatens Santiago. Alberto thanks Mariana for bringing him closer to his son. Soraya learns of Luis Alberto's engagement. Elena refuses to help Luis Alberto in the organization of his wedding and asks him to contact Soraya to apologize to her. Luis Alberto continues to trust León. Soraya exhumes her father's body for a DNA test that later confirms that Mariana is Rafael's daughter.
| 27 | "Quitarla del camino para siempre" | 29 March 2022 | 5 October 2022 | 3.1 | 1.30 |
Soraya learns that Mariana has every right to claim 50 percent of the inheritance and will not allow her to take what is hers. Diego kisses Guadalupe. Elena wants to formalize her relationship with León. Luis Alberto visits Soraya and she confesses to him what she tried to do after the humiliation she put him through. León looks for a way to get Mariana out of his way. Soraya arrives in Catemaco to get the herb that Yolanda asked for.
| 28 | "Quiero que sufra" | 30 March 2022 | 6 October 2022 | 3.7 | 1.32 |
Britny comes to Santiago's defense when she sees the negative attitude of her father and brother. Tonatiuh gives Soraya the herbs for her work. Luis Alberto proposes to Mariana to move to a new house once they get married. Soraya confesses to the shaman that the decision she made is because a woman stole the loves of her life and she will not forgive her. Guadalupe begins to notice a strange situation in her body. Mariana makes a request for her wedding. Matilde begins to give Mariana the potion following Soraya's instructions. Santiago complains to his mother for what she did to Britny. Mariana feels uncomfortable knowing that Elena is going to interfere in the organization of her wedding.
| 29 | "Una disculpa sincera" | 31 March 2022 | 6 October 2022 | 3.4 | 1.32 |
Soraya refuses to let Uriel leave her friend Sofía for her, so she proposes another idea. Soraya apologizes to the Salvatierra family. Mariana asks Elena not to waste her time, especially if she is working. Soraya continues with her plan to poison Mariana. Britny receives a message from Polo that makes her nervous. Uriel realizes that León is meeting with Víctor. Mariana begins to feel sick and Britny thinks her friend is pregnant so she takes a home test, but it comes out negative. Soraya sends a gift to her friend Sofía. Britny does not want to see Santiago.
| 30 | "La boda del año" | 1 April 2022 | 7 October 2022 | 3.1 | 1.30 |
Luis Alberto refuses Constanza's invitation. Guadalupe receives an unflattering medical diagnosis. Mariana is seen by the family doctor when she suffers from dizziness. Britny breaks up with Santiago because she feels guilty for what Polo did. Sofía assures Soraya that she will not allow another woman to take Uriel away from her. Mariana is about to get married, but Soraya's poison begins to damage her health.
| 31 | "Al borde de la muerte" | 4 April 2022 | 7 October 2022 | 3.3 | 1.30 |
Luis Alberto believes that life continues to punish him and now he fears losing Mariana. Emilio and Carlos discover that Santiago is Alberto Salvatierra's stepson. Britny confesses to Santiago that she is not happy. León discovers that Soraya poisoned Mariana. Alberto begins to feel ill and asks Felipe not to tell anyone. Soraya puts on Mariana's wedding dress and imagines she is marrying Luis Alberto.
| 32 | "Cadena de oración" | 5 April 2022 | 10 October 2022 | 3.2 | 1.47 |
Matilde fears that the drops given to Mariana have her on the verge of death so she is willing to confess the truth, but Soraya won't let her. Britny meets Tamara. Uriel is indifferent to Sofía and she does not want to lose him. All the doctors gather to save Mariana and Soraya takes advantage of the moment to approach Luis Alberto. Luis Alberto agrees to change Mariana's treatment to save her life.
| 33 | "Derechito al infierno" | 6 April 2022 | 10 October 2022 | 3.5 | 1.47 |
Mariana finally reacts and is out of danger, but Soraya looks for a way to get her and those who could unmask her out of the way. Soraya finds an old weapon in a box full of memories, but her deranged mind will make her use it against Matilde.
| 34 | "Una bala para Mariana" | 7 April 2022 | 11 October 2022 | 3.2 | 1.46 |
Soraya is seen in a dump where she murders Matilde. Mariana is discharged from the hospital. León hides the earring that fell out of Daniela's ear. Daniela realizes that she lost her earring. Daniela finds Matilde's finds the bottle that Soraya gave her. Sofía complains to Soraya for sleeping with Uriel. Elena gives León an ultimatum to decide to have a formal relationship with her. Soraya prepares her father's gun to shoot Mariana. Ramiro confesses to Britny that Polo's suicide attempt was a lie. Soraya arrives to congratulate Mariana for returning home. Daniela gathers the family as she has the results of the vial found. The professor warns that the bottle contains the substance that caused Mariana's discomfort. Soraya is left alone with Mariana, and is ready to shoot her.
| 35 | "Los declaro marido y mujer" | 8 April 2022 | 11 October 2022 | 3.0 | 1.46 |
Luis Alberto and his family interrupt Soraya with the news that Mariana was poisoned by Matilde. Elena looks for León to carry out her threat and realizes that he has hidden women's clothes. Britny confronts Polo for having lied to her and tells him that she never wants to see him again. Luis Alberto gives the news that in a week he will marry Mariana. Uriel tells Soraya about Leon's lies. Luis Alberto and Mariana get married in front of their loved ones. Mariana goes to change her shoes and Soraya takes advantage of the fact that she is alone to do her job, León stops her and tells her he will always be on her side but Sofia watches them.
| 36 | "Una segunda opinión" | 11 April 2022 | 12 October 2022 | 3.0 | 1.47 |
León asks Soraya to trust him because he has no intention of betraying her. Luis Alberto and Mariana leave for their honeymoon. Uriel apologizes to Sofía for his deception and she confesses that Soraya and León are lovers. Sofía ends her friendship with Soraya. Alberto confronts Torres about his irresponsibility with the factory waste. Mariana and Luis Alberto return from their honeymoon and she confirms to Luis Alberto that she is pregnant. León is present at Alberto's surgery.
| 37 | "El señor ha fallecido" | 12 April 2022 | 13 October 2022 | 3.3 | 1.42 |
The doctor informs the family that Alberto's operation was a success. Sofía wants to gain Victor's trust to learn about León’s relationship with the company. Luis Alberto and Mariana inform Soraya that they will become parents and she vows to end their offspring. Alberto suffers a heart attack during his tennis match. Luis Alberto becomes jealous of Santiago's responsibility for the factory.
| 38 | "Llegó mi momento" | 13 April 2022 | 13 October 2022 | 3.4 | 1.42 |
Uriel informs Soraya that Alberto died, she breaks down in tears when she learns that she will no longer see the person she considered a father. León prevents the autopsy from being performed on Alberto. Elena arrives to console her son and comments that it is time to think about the will since there are many people who want to take his fortune. León celebrates Alberto's death. Elena blames Daniela for Alberto's death, Santiago does not allow Elena to insult his mother. Dr. Murillo questions the reasons why Alberto's autopsy was not performed. Alberto's last will is made known.
| 39 | "Ellos no son mi familia" | 14 April 2022 | 14 October 2022 | 2.6 | 1.30 |
Luis Alberto rejects that Santiago is part of the consortium's shares. Mariana tries to reassure Luis Alberto, but he cannot believe that she is on Santiago's side. Luis Alberto returns to Mariana her father's factory. Santiago is willing to give up the shares. Soraya asks Mariana to think smart otherwise she may lose Luis Alberto. Soraya confronts Elena for her betrayal.
| 40 | "Soraya le tiende una trampa a Mariana" | 15 April 2022 | 14 October 2022 | 2.8 | 1.30 |
Luis Alberto becomes jealous when he sees Mariana near Santiago, she assures him that he is not his enemy. Elena looks for a way to get Daniela and Santiago to sell their shares. Soraya tries to get León to tell Luis Alberto about Santiago and Mariana's relationship. Luis Alberto accepts his father's last will and gives Daniela a warning. Soraya installs a series of cameras in Santiago's apartment so that Mariana falls into her trap, she receives the videos, manipulates them and sends them to Luis Alberto.
| 41 | "Eres una mentirosa" | 18 April 2022 | 17 October 2022 | 3.5 | 1.61 |
Luis Alberto confronts Mariana for being unfaithful with Santiago, when she sees the video she rejects the accusations, but he hits Santiago. Daniela believes that Elena is the one behind Santiago and Mariana's problem. Luis Alberto relapses into alcohol and returns to gambling. Daniela and Santiago decide to leave the Salvatierra mansion. Daniela reveals to Elena that she is willing to run for the presidency of the consortium. Luis Alberto, knowing Daniela's decision, asks Soraya to vote for him, and in return she steals a kiss from him.
| 42 | "Apuñalar el corazón" | 19 April 2022 | 18 October 2022 | 3.5 | 1.40 |
Luis Alberto rejects the idea of Soraya being his lover, but she gives him her vote to become the president of the consortium. Mariana returns to Santiago's apartment in search of evidence. León wants to convince Luis Alberto to open an office in Brazil. Elena asks Luis Alberto to teach Mariana a lesson. León informs Daniela and Santiago of the company's expansion plans and assures them that Soraya is the one to stay on as president when Luis Alberto is not in the country. Luis Alberto decides to go to Brazil and leaves a farewell letter to Mariana. Soraya takes her place in the company and continues with her revenge against Mariana and kidnaps Pulgoso.
| 43 | "Más sola que nunca" | 20 April 2022 | 19 October 2022 | 3.2 | 1.45 |
Mariana is upset to see that the Salvatierra's security did not take care of Pulgoso. Sofía informs Uriel that Víctor received a call from León and gives him details of their meeting. Luis Alberto does not answer Mariana's calls. Soraya sees Mariana in the office and comments that Luis Alberto is having a great time in Brazil. Mariana is sure that Soraya is behind the video and because of her anger she starts to feel bad so her doctor asks her to rest. Soraya denies Santiago the money to buy the machines for the factory, León complains to her when he hears the news, but she assures him that he has no reason to ask her anything. Mariana goes into labor pains.
| 44 | "El heredero" | 21 April 2022 | 20 October 2022 | 3.5 | 1.37 |
Mariana goes into labor and is taken to the hospital. Although she insists on waiting for Luis Alberto, the doctors take her to the operating room where she gives birth. Luis Alberto finally arrives to meet his son, but is surprised to see Santiago in the hospital. León receives a visit from his father, who asks him to let him live with him. Soraya takes advantage of the fact that Mariana is walking alone with her son in the park to steal him.
| 45 | "Muertos por dentro" | 22 April 2022 | 21 October 2022 | 3.2 | 1.39 |
While Mariana desperately searches for her son, Soraya pays for the child's disappearance. In the midst of the pressure, Chícharo, the man who has Betito, cannot go through with burning him and abandons him to an unknown family. Luis Alberto receives his son's medalion that was found in the middle of a fire and shares this news with Mariana. Elena tries to console Mariana's pain and seeks her out to offer her support. Elena discovers León's obsession with Daniela. León can't take it anymore and ends up stealing a kiss from Daniela.
| 46 | "Hasta nunca, querido" | 25 April 2022 | 24 October 2022 | 3.5 | 1.88 |
León forcibly kisses Daniela and assures her that he is still in love with her. Elena knows the whole story of León's father. Luis Alberto feels guilty about his son's death. León learns that his father confessed the whole truth to Elena, he asks Soraya to help him destroy the Salvatierra consortium, but she refuses. León humiliates Elena by assuring her that he would never look at a woman like her. Uriel and Becerra discover that León is linked to Alberto's death. Soraya, feeling blackmailed by León, decides to kill him.
| 47 | "Queda usted detenida" | 26 April 2022 | 25 October 2022 | 3.7 | 1.71 |
Soraya tries to erase all evidence of her crime. Elena learns what happened to León. Uriel and Becerra find the DNA test results and discover that Mariana is the daughter of Rafael, Soraya's adoptive father. Elena assures Soraya that she is afraid of her. Uriel confirms to Luis Alberto that León was involved in his father's death and is also the owner of the company Rio de Oro. Mariana confronts Soraya for hiding the truth, Soraya assures her that she is not willing to share the inheritance. The authorities arrive at Soraya's house and upon finding evidence, she is arrested as the main suspect in León’s death.
| 48 | "Culpable de asesinato" | 27 April 2022 | 26 October 2022 | 3.8 | 1.81 |
Elena confesses to Luis Alberto that she fell in love with León. Uriel learns that his cousin is leaving the country with Víctor. Elena is willing to help Soraya. Mariana questions the reasons why her real father never wanted to tell her the truth. Santiago proposes to Britny. Mariana visits her father Rafael's grave. Sofía reveals to Elena that Soraya and León were lovers and she has no doubt that she also had something to do with Mariana's poisoning. Elena shows the judge evidence that Soraya was the one who murdered León and is sentenced to 25 years in prison.
| 49 | "Extraño a mi mujer" | 28 April 2022 | 28 October 2022 | 3.4 | 1.49 |
Mariana creates the Alberto Salvatierra Foundation to help find missing persons. Víctor becomes Soraya's accomplice. After Luis Alberto's good management of the consortium, everyone accepts his continuation as president. Rita faints and Tomasito wants to move his mother to the capital. Soraya is released from jail ready to take revenge on the Salvatierras. Mariana receives a call to inform her who has her son.
| 50 | "¡Encontré a mi hijo!" | 29 April 2022 | 31 October 2022 | 3.3 | 1.56 |
A man contacts Mariana to give her information about her son, she tries to tell Luis Alberto, but regrets it. Soraya comes to live at Víctor’s house. Vivian remembers when Soraya helped her in jail. José assures Mariana that Tomasito is her son, she decides to do a DNA test to check if he is really Betito. Vivian tries to gain Luis Alberto's trust. Soraya witnesses Roberta's rejection at school. Mariana confirms with the DNA test that Tomasito is her son Betito.
| 51 | "La venganza está en marcha" | 2 May 2022 | 1 November 2022 | 3.4 | 1.47 |
Mariana confirms to José that Tomasito is his son, but José asks her not to tell him the truth because it could cause a lot of pain to his wife Rita. Soraya pretends to be a nurse and meets Mariana's son. Soraya pays Roberta's classmates to go to her birthday party. Luis Alberto believes that Mariana no longer needs him. Mariana shows Tomasito and José the apartment where they are going to live. Soraya and Victor plan to accuse Luis Alberto of something very strong so that his shares fall and Rio de Oro buys them and she returns as the owner of the Salvatierra company.
| 52 | "Un juego muy peligroso" | 3 May 2022 | 2 November 2022 | 3.5 | 1.32 |
Mariana confronts Chicharo Veron and assures him that he should be in jail, Soraya threatens him. Mariana gives Tomasito her medalion. Vivian makes Luis Alberto believe that Mariana is cheating on him. Soraya tells Roberta that she always wanted to have a daughter. Luis Alberto surprises Mariana with a kiss. Soraya takes advantage of Elena being alone to cause her an accident.
| 53 | "¡No te vayas!" | 4 May 2022 | 3 November 2022 | 3.2 | 1.58 |
Soraya is furious when she learns that Elena did not die. José and Tomasito receive the worst news about Rita. Luis Alberto assures Vivian that he does not want to raise her expectations since he loves his wife. Elena's nurse becomes Soraya's accomplice. Tomasito says goodbye to Mariana, she tries to stop him from leaving, but is unsuccessful.
| 54 | "El corazón no se equivoca" | 5 May 2022 | 4 November 2022 | 3.6 | 1.61 |
Mariana reveals to Luis Alberto that she found Betito and informs him that he returned to his hometown, but for the moment they cannot tell him the truth since she made a promise to José. Tomasito shares with his mother that Mariana gave him her medallion. Britny is convinced that her brother is involved in bad things. Chícharo kidnaps Mariana's son, she is willing to pay the ransom. Luis Alberto with the help of Becerra find Tomasito, he struggles with Veron and falls into a pond, his son faints and falls into the water.
| 55 | "Yo soy tu mamá" | 6 May 2022 | 7 November 2022 | 3.4 | 1.62 |
Soraya swears to Elena that she will cripple her for having betrayed her. Mariana confesses to Tomasito that she and Luis Alberto are his real parents. Mariana proposes to her son to live with her, Tomasito refuses, but José convinces him to start a new life with his parents. Elena assures Luis Alberto that Soraya went to the mansion to threaten her. Luis Alberto is arrested after the body of a woman is found in the trunk of his car.
| 56 | "Soy muy buena siendo mala" | 9 May 2022 | 9 November 2022 | 3.9 | 1.63 |
Betito sees the Salvatierra consortium and Mariana informs him that he already owns certain shares of the company. Luis Alberto is certain that he was set up. Víctor congratulates Soraya for being so good at what she does. Luis Alberto is released from jail and faces questioning from the press. Mariana decides to send Betito to Britny's house. Soraya forces Sofía to record a video in which she confesses everything she has stolen from Uriel in the past 18 years, and in fear she accepts. Soraya returns to the consortium and assures Mariana that she is willing to recover what is hers.
| 57 | "Tener el enemigo en casa" | 10 May 2022 | 10 November 2022 | 3.0 | 1.63 |
Soraya informs Luis Alberto that she is out of jail for good behavior and is willing to regain her place in the company now that she owns the shares. Johnny confesses to Luis Alberto that he opened the trunk of his car so that they could put the woman's body in it. Daniela discovers that the nurse is following Soraya’s orders, so she confronts her. Soraya uses Roberta to cause an accident and blame Betito. Elena apologizes to Daniela.
| 58 | "Jaque mate" | 11 May 2022 | 11 November 2022 | 3.7 | 1.58 |
Soraya is named president of the consortium and shows Luis Alberto a document signed by Betito to represent him in the company, and fires all the executives. Víctor tries to hurt Soraya, but when she realizes it, she decides to stab him in the back. Luis Alberto assures Betito that Soraya set him up. Mariana arrives ready to save her son from Soraya, but Soraya hits her and causes her to lose consciousness and puts her in the truck. Elena gives Luis Alberto words of encouragement now that she knows he lost his father's company.
| 59 | "Sus últimas horas de vida" | 12 May 2022 | 14 November 2022 | 3.4 | 1.73 |
When Betito tries to flee, Soraya tries to shoot him, but Mariana gets in the way. Luis Alberto and Becerra discover that Víctor is dead. Luis Alberto manages to free Roberta and informs her what happened to her father. Luis Alberto asks for the necessary security to be deployed to find Mariana and his son. Luis Alberto tries to convince Soraya to free Mariana and Betito, but she assures him that she no longer trusts him and when he doesn't obey her orders, she shoots him.
| 60 | "Juntos por siempre" | 13 May 2022 | 14 November 2022 | 3.7 | 1.73 |
Soraya reveals that she was the one who kidnapped Betito and caused Elena's accident. Luis Alberto hits Soraya and manages to untie Mariana and Betito. Soraya sets the cabin on fire; everyone manages to get out, except her. Luis Alberto and Mariana decide to renew their wedding vows and she surprises him with the news that she is pregnant.

== Reception ==
=== Ratings ===
Viewership and ratings per season of Los ricos también lloran
| Season | Timeslot (CT) | Episodes | First aired | | Last aired | | Avg. viewers (millions) |
| Season | Timeslot (CT) | Episodes | Date | Viewers (millions) | Date | Viewers (millions) | Avg. viewers (millions) |
|---|---|---|---|---|---|---|---|
| 1 | Mon–Fri 9:30 p.m. | 55 (Note: Should reflect the number of episodes that contribute to the average given in the last column) | 21 February 2022 | 4.1 | 13 May 2022 | 3.7 | 3.54 |

=== Awards and nominations ===
| Year | Award | Category | Nominated | Result | Ref |
|---|---|---|---|---|---|
| 2022 | Produ Awards | Best Short Telenovela | Los ricos también lloran | Won | |
| 2022 | Produ Awards | Best Directing - Superseries or Telenovela | Luis Manzo and Pavel Vázquez | Nominated | |
