= Distroller =

Mexican toy company

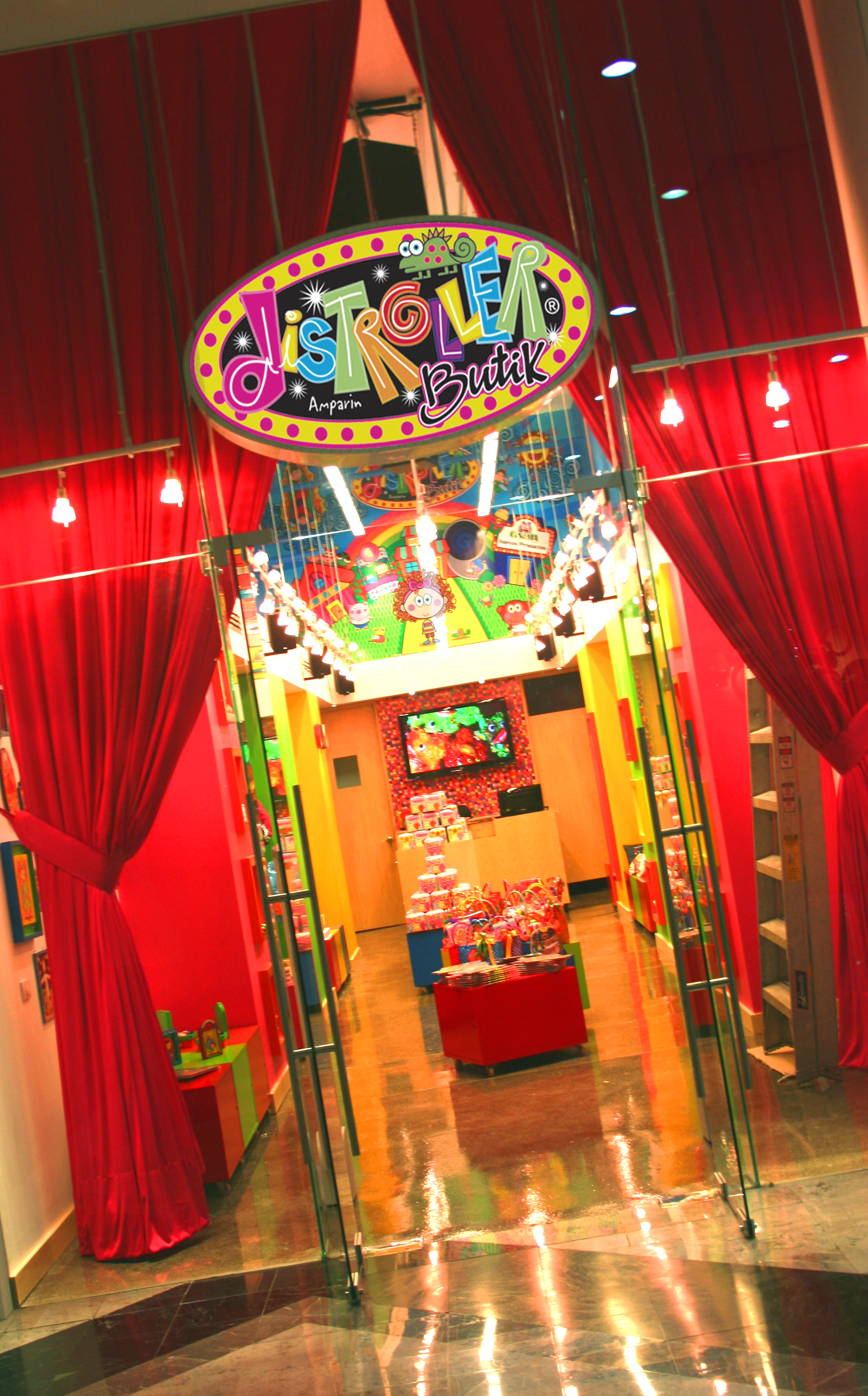
Distroller store in Mexico City

Distroller is a Mexican toy company founded in 2004 by graphic designer Amparo "Amparín" Serrano. The brand first gained recognition through the popularity of the graphic design Virgencita Plis, which depicts a caricatured version of the Virgin of Guadalupe and appeared on key chains, notebooks, and many other products. Following its success, the brand expanded into a toy company.

...

== History ==
In 2004, Amparo Serrano began creating graphic designs for family and close friends, and created the image of Virgencita Plis in response to a request from a friend of hers for a baptism. The design gained popularity and was printed on notebooks, backpacks, notebooks, pillows, among many other products. The name of the brand is a play on the word "destroyer", created from a character by Amparo 'Amparín' Serrano.

In 2007, Distroller licensed the product image in response to unauthorized use of the designs on products for sale in Mexico City's Historic Center, and from there began collaborations with the Scribe brand and allowed the creation of its own branded products. 10 years later, the Virgencita Plis design appeared on a series of National Lottery tickets. In interviews, Serrano stated that her ideas originated in Mexican popular culture, including a caricatured version of Frida Kahlo. Its products are sold in 60 points of sale, including the brand's own stores

In 2012, it launched the Neonatos Ksimeritos collection, toys of different colors that emulate newborn babies with accessories such as pacifiers, umbilical cords and incubators, toys that were very popular in Mexico and were exported to other Latin American countries and Spain in 2018 as part of an expansion strategy.

In 2017, Distroller USA was founded. It had established a flagship store in Los Angeles. It closed in 2022, four months after the passing of Amparo.

On October 31st, 2025, Distroller Vintash, a separate company run by Serrano's daughter Minnie West, opened its doors. It sells Blind box versions of popular Distroller designs in the form of keychains and pop sockets.

== Controversies ==
In 2018, the Neonatos toy collection and its commercials were criticized for promoting gender stereotypes and having anti-abortion connotations. Regina Tamés, director of the Grupo de Información en Reproducción Elegita (GIRE), declared for the Verne section of El País:

“It is very unfortunate that in 2018 there are still toys intended only for girls or boys. In this case, motherhood is idealized and girls are forced to believe that it is the only aspiration they should have in mind.”

In response, Serrano expressed that she deeply regrets the “misinterpretation” of her creations, and the company denied that its products had a Catholic ideological charge. In 2024, the song included in the original Ksimeritos advertisement went viral on TikTok when it was included in a trend where people are shown caring for other people, animals, plants or objects that are fragile or in constant danger.

In 2019, as part of its 'Chamoy y Amiguis' collection, Distroller launched an Afro-Mexican doll called "Mole D'Hoya", which includes a starfish and a tick as pets. The doll was criticized on social media for promoting racist discrimination.
