= Aurora Gil =

Mexican actress

- Born: Tijuana, Baja California, Mexico
- Occupation: Actress
- Years active: 2003–present

Aurora Gil (born in Tijuana, Baja California, Mexico), is a Mexican actress, best known for her role as Josefina Aguilar in Telemundo's series Señora Acero. Previously she had a recurring role in the HBO series Capadocia. Her most recent work was in La usurpadora, remake of the 1998 telenovela of the same name, and where she played Teresa Bernal. Gil studied acting at the Center for the Performing Arts of the Northwest of the INBA, and also studied performing arts at the center of Argos Comunicación; Casazul. In 2016 she obtained her first nomination at the Your World Awards for Best Super Series Actress, but she was not a winner.

== Filmography ==
=== Film roles ===
Year	Title	Roles	Notes
2004	El corazón de Fanny	Fanny	Short film
2011	Crímenes de lujuria	Bárbara	
2015	Las Aparicio	Aura	
2017	Belzebuth	Marina Ritter	

=== Television roles ===
Year	Title	Roles	Notes
2003	Ladrón de corazones	Acompañante	
2003	El alma herida	Martha	
2005	Los Plateados	Ángeles Villegas	
2008–2012	Capadocia	Yolanda Torres	Recurring role (seasons 1–3);33 episodes
2010	Las Aparicio	Mara	
2010	Bienes raíces	María Elena	Episodes: "Mujeres orgullosas" and "Un buen comienzo"
2011	Emperatriz	Lulu	
2012	Infames	Amanda Ortíz	
2013	La Patrona	Romina Romero	Recurring role; 15 episodes
2013	Como dice el dicho	Irma	Episode: "A lo hecho pecho"
2014–2019	Señora Acero	Josefina Aguilar	Recurring role (seasons 1-5); 347 episodes
2016	Un día cualquiera	Cynthia Yamila	Episode: "Bigamia" Episode: "Las apariencias engañan"
2018	Luis Miguel: The Series	Cynthia Casas	Episodes: "Todo el amor del mundo" and "No me platiques más"
2018	Falco	Katia	Episode: "Memorabilia"
2019	La usurpadora	Teresa Bernal	Series regular; 25 episodes
2019	The Club	Lola	Series regular; 25 episodes
2020	Esta historia me suena	Gloria	Episode: "No es serio este cementerio"
