= Macarena Oz =

Mexican actress

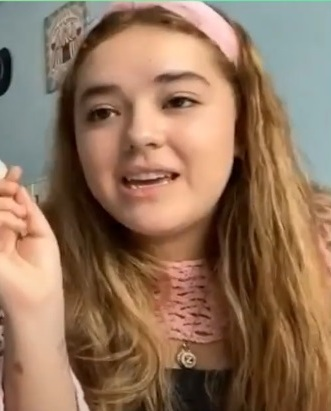
- Oz in 2023
- Born: 11 February 2003 (age 23); Mexico City, Mexico
- Education: Televisa Children's Art Education Center
- Occupation: Actor
- Years active: 2013–present

Macarena Oz (born on February 11, 2003) is a Mexican actress, best known for her role Roxana Pérez in the Telemundo's telenovela Los miserables (2014), and more recently as Lisette Bernal in the Televisa's drama series La usurpadora (2019), reboot based on the 1998 Mexican telenovela of the same name. She studied acting at the Televisa Children's Art Education Center during 2010 to 2012.

== Filmography ==
Television roles and films performance
Year	Title	Roles	Notes
2013	Nueva vida	Unknown role	Episode: "In vitro"
2014	La impostora	Sofía Altamira	Recurring role; 115 episodes
2014	Sho-Shan y la Dama Oscura	Violeta 8 years old	Film
2014–2015	Los miserables	Roxana Pérez	Recurring role; 92 episodes
2015–2016	La rosa de Guadalupe	Julieta Melissa Ana Maria	Episode: "Reencuentro del corazón" Episode: "La edad de la punzada" Episode: “Llenita de Amor”
2016–2018	Como dice el dicho	Various roles	9 episodes
2016–2017	Vuelve Temprano	Young Renata Zavaleta	Recurring role; 4 episodes
2017	Guerra de ídolos	Singer	Episode: "Urge distraer a la prensa"
2017	3 familias	Norma	TV series; recurring role
2018	Si yo fuera tú	Olivia	Film
2019	Los elegidos	Sofía Lopez Torrija	Series regular; 20 episodes
2019	La usurpadora	Lisette Bernal	Series regular; 25 episodes
