= Me gusta, pero me asusta =

- Directed by: Beto Gómez
- Screenplay by: Beto Gómez; Aurora Jauregui; Alfonso Suárez
- Starring: Minnie West; Alejandro Speitzer
- Edited by: Nacho Ruiz Capillas
- Music by: Mark Mothersbaugh
- Production companies: Grupo Telefilms; Wetzer Films
- Release date: 22 September 2017 (Mexico)
- Country: Mexico
- Language: Spanish

Me gusta, pero me asusta is a Mexican comedy film directed by Beto Gómez. It is a production of Telefilms Group and the production company created by Minnie West and Alejandro Speitzer known as Wetzer Films. The film deals with the life of a young man named Brayan Rodríguez, who has an obligation to expand his family's business in Mexico City. It stars Minnie West and Alejandro Speitzer.

A sequel, Me encanta pero me espanta was released in 2021.

== Cast ==
- Minnie West as Claudia
- Alejandro Speitzer as Brayan Rodríguez
- Joaquín Cosío as Don Gumaro
- Silverio Palacios as Martín Menchaca
- Héctor Kotsifaks as Norris Zazueta
- Lisette Morelos as Martina
