= Minnie West =

Mexican actress (born 1993)

- Born: Amparo Alexa West Serrano; 17 April 1993 (age 31); Mexico City, Mexico
- Occupation(s): Actress, producer
- Years active: 2010–present

Amparo West Serrano (born 17 April 1993; Mexico City, Mexico) artistically known as Minnie West is a Mexican television actress and producer. She is best known as actress for her role as Adriana Montes in the Telemundo's telenovela Eva la trailera. She also owns the Wetzer Films production company, along with Alejandro Speitzer, her ex-boyfriend.

== Personal life ==
Amparo West Serrano is the daughter of David West, American producer and president of Westwood Entertainment, and Amparín Serrano, Mexican designer. She was admitted to a psychiatric hospital for Post-traumatic stress disorder after witnessing her mother's death in August 2022, due to a fatal accidental fall from an unsecured balcony. She dated Mexican actor, Alejandro Speitzer for 7 years and never publicly spoke about their relationship until revealing they had broken up and later spoke after her mother's death. She previously dated the younger brother of Spanish singer/actress, Belinda Peregrín.

== Filmography ==
Film performance
| Year | Title | Roles | Notes |
|---|---|---|---|
| 2017 | Me gusta, pero me asusta | Claudia | Also as executive producer |
| 2019 | La boda de mi mejor amigo | Tammi | |
| 2021 | Cerca de ti | Leonor | |
| 2021 | Me encanta pero me espanta | Claudia | |
| 2022 | Valentino, Be Your Own Hero Or Villain | Marisol executioner | |
| 2022 | Me vuelves loca | Lorenza | |

Television roles
| Year | Title | Roles | Notes |
|---|---|---|---|
| 2010 | La rosa de Guadalupe | Laura | Episode: "La luz te va a salvar" |
| 2016 | Eva la trailera | Adriana Montes | Series regular; 116 episodes |
| 2019 | The Club | Sofía | Main role (season 1); 25 episodes |
| 2021 | Luis Miguel: The Series | Gaby | Episode: "Ayer" |

== Awards and nominations ==
| Year | Award | Category | Nominated works | Result |
|---|---|---|---|---|
| 2018 | Diosas de Plata | Best Newcomer – Female | Me gusta, pero me asusta | Won |
