= Papá soltero (2025 TV series) =

- Genre: Sitcom
- Based on: Papá soltero by Carlos Aguilar
- Written by: Charlie Barrientos; Mauricio Barrientos; Esteban Garrido; Edgar Buendía
- Directed by: Francisco Franco Alba; José Ramón Chávez Delgado; Alonso Iñiguez
- Starring: Mauricio Ochmann; Norma Angélica; Jorge Luis Cordero; Ana Tena; Romina Poza; David Aguiar; Erick Velarde; Mauricio Barrientos
- Composers: Manuel Vázquez; Gabriel Chávez
- Country of origin: Mexico
- Original language: Spanish
- No. of seasons: 2
- No. of episodes: 20

Production
- Executive producers: Charlie Barrientos; Mauricio Barrientos; Jorge Garcia; Gonzalo Sagardía; Santiago de la Rica; Francisco Franco Alba
- Production company: Onza Américas

Original release
- Network: Vix
- Release: 13 June – 5 September 2025

Papá soltero is a Mexican television sitcom based on the 1987 series of the same name created by Carlos Aguilar. The series stars Mauricio Ochmann, Norma Angélica, Jorge Luis Cordero, Ana Tena, Romina Poza, David Aguiar, Erick Velarde and Mauricio Barrientos. It premiered on Vix on 13 June 2025.

The second season was released on 5 September 2025.

== Cast ==
=== Main ===
- Mauricio Ochmann as César
- Norma Angélica as Gumara
- Jorge Luis Cordero as Pocholo
- Ana Tena as María
- Romina Poza as Ana
- David Aguiar as Cesarín
- Erick Velarde as Miguel
- Mauricio Barrientos as Alejandro

=== Recurring and guest stars ===
- Ana de la Reguera as Sandra
- Kira Miró
- Alexis Ayala as Luis
- Maik Alexandre
- Fabián Herz
- Jorge Briseño
- Marco Antonio Aguirre
- Marcelo Galván
- Fabián Aguilar
- Martín Saracho
- Jesús Ochoa
- Arancha del Toro
- Mateo Sinova

== Episodes ==
Season	Episodes	Originally released
1	10	13 June 2025
2	10	5 September 2025

=== Season 1 (2025) ===
No. overall	No. in season	Title	Original release date
1	1	"La manada"	13 June 2025
2	2	"El papadrino"	13 June 2025
3	3	"Cumpleaños explosivo"	13 June 2025
4	4	"No va más"	13 June 2025
5	5	"Cita doble"	13 June 2025
6	6	"El juicio"	13 June 2025
7	7	"Al que le pique que se rasque"	13 June 2025
8	8	"La familia perfecta"	13 June 2025
9	9	"El adiós de María"	13 June 2025
10	10	"Visita inesperada"	13 June 2025

=== Season 2 (2025) ===
No. overall	No. in season	Title	Original release date
11	1	"El otro papá soltero"	5 September 2025
12	2	"Un K.O. para Rocky"	5 September 2025
13	3	"Buscando el héroe de Cesarin"	5 September 2025
14	4	"No tan inseparables"	5 September 2025
15	5	"La primera vez de Ana"	5 September 2025
16	6	"Cambio de huaraches"	5 September 2025
17	7	"¡Esto es Esparta!"	5 September 2025
18	8	"El cumpleaños de Sandra"	5 September 2025
19	9	"¡Papá está de novio!"	5 September 2025
20	10	"El fin de la Manada"	5 September 2025
