= Ana Tena (actress) =

Mexican actress

- Born: 19 March 2004 (age 22); Mexico City, Mexico
- Occupation: Actress
- Years active: 2014–present
- Relatives: Isabella Tena (sister)

Ana Tena (born 19 March 2004) is a Mexican actress best known for her roles in telenovelas.

== Career ==
At the age of eight, Tena entered the Centro de Educación Artística (CEA) of Televisa, to study acting. In 2015, she participated in Halloween shorts for Televisa's website. She then appeared in several television series, including La rosa de Guadalupe, El Vato, Mi adorable maldición, and Corazón contento. In 2019, Tena landed her first major role in a telenovela when she was cast in Soltero con hijas, portraying Alexa Paz Contreras.

In 2022, Tena appeared in the biographical series El último rey, portraying Alejandra Fernández, daughter of mariachi singer Vicente Fernández. Later that year, she was cast in La madrastra, alongside Aracely Arámbula and Andrés Palacios. In the telenovela, she portrayed Lucía Lombardo Cisneros, the daughter of Arámbula and Palacios' characters. Tena then appeared in El amor invencible (2023) and Marea de pasiones (2024).

In 2025, she played María in Papá soltero, remake of the 1987 series of the same name. Her most recent role was Julia Olmos in Hermanas, un amor compartido.

== Filmography ==
Television roles
Year	Title	Role	Notes
2014–2018	La rosa de Guadalupe	Aurora Amanda Laura Diana	Episode: "Ébola" Episode: "Una mamá de corazón" Episode: "Donde nace el perdón" Episode: "En una cajita de cristal"
2016	El Vato	Child Mariana Gaxiola	Episode: "Nuestra gente"
2017	Mi adorable maldición	Young Aurora	2 episodes
2018	Corazón contento	Lolita	2 episodes
2019–2020	Soltero con hijas	Alexa Paz	Main cast
2020	Esta historia me suena	Laura Luz María	Episode: "El color de tus ojos" Episode: "Tú lo decidiste"
2020–2021	Como dice el dicho	Caro Lindsay	Episode: "Mentiras de cazadores son las mayores" Episode: "Más vale llorar que aguantar"
2022	El último rey	Alejandra Fernández	Main cast
2022	Donde hubo fuego	Young Olivia Serrano	3 episodes
2022	La madrastra	Lucía Lombardo Cisneros	Main cast
2023	El amor invencible	Dolores "Lola" García	Main cast
2024	Marea de pasiones	Camila Marrero	Main cast
2025	Papá soltero	María	Main cast
2026	Hermanas, un amor compartido	Julia Olmos Cancino	Main cast
2026	Doc	Claudia Vega	Guest star
2026	Una familia complicada	Ana	Main cast
