= Soltero con hijas =

Mexican telenovela

- Genre: Telenovela
- Written by: Pablo Ferrer; Santiago Pineda; Hugo Moreno
- Directed by: Aurelio Ávila; Ivonne Cartas
- Starring: Vanessa Guzmán; Gabriel Soto
- Theme music composer: Eduardo Murguía; Mauricio Arriaga
- Opening theme: "Soltero" by Los Ángeles Azules and Luis Coronel
- Ending theme: "La Playita" by Emilio Osorio
- Country of origin: Mexico
- Original language: Spanish
- No. of seasons: 1
- No. of episodes: 87

Production
- Executive producer: Juan Osorio
- Producers: Roy Rojas; Ignacio Ortiz
- Editors: Mauricio Coronel; Felipe Ortiz; Mónica Hernández
- Camera setup: Multi-camera
- Production company: Televisa

Original release
- Network: Las Estrellas
- Release: 28 October 2019 – 23 February 2020

Soltero con hijas is a Mexican telenovela that premiered on Las Estrellas on 28 October 2019, and ended on 23 February 2020. The series is produced by Juan Osorio for Televisa, and it stars Vanessa Guzmán and Gabriel Soto.

== Plot ==
Nicolás is a single and carefree man whose life changes when he has to take care of his three orphaned nieces. He receives help from his neighbor Victoria, and unexpectedly, falls in love with her. His biggest obstacle will be Victoria's father, who will try to break their relationship.

== Cast ==
- Vanessa Guzmán as Victoria Robles Navarro, a psychiatrist focused on children and teenagers. Her dream is to form a family but her fiancé cancels their wedding and she is diagnosed with endometriosis.
- Gabriel Soto as Nicolás Contreras, a single man who hates commitments and does not think about getting married or having children. When his sister Cristina dies, he must take care of his three nieces: Camila, Alexa, and Sofía. He works as a public relations manager at a hotel.
- Pablo Montero as Rodrigo Montero, owner of the hotel where Nicolás works at and is Victoria's ex-boyfriend. He has a son named Hugo.
- Mayrín Villanueva as Gabriela García Pérez, manager of the hotel. She is married to Juventino and has two sons, Samuel and Gustavo.
- Irina Baeva as Masha Simonova, a Russian who arrives in Acapulco looking for her father, whom she doesn't know. She is attracted to Nicolás and Rodrigo.
- Carlos Mata as Efraín Robles, Victoria's father. He is a retired captain and wants his daughter to get married and have children.
- Laura Flores as Alondra Ruvalcaba, grandmother of Camila, Alexa, and Sofía. She will fight for the custody of the girls.
- Sebastián Poza as Juan Diego "Juandi" Barrios, Ileana's son.
- Azul Guaita as Camila Paz Contreras, Nicolás' oldest niece. She is mature and responsible and it frustrates her to see that her uncle does not have the maturity, nor the responsibility necessary to take care of her and her sisters.
- Laura Vignatti as Ileana Barrios Sánchez, a single mother and Victoria's best friend. She teaches a water aerobics class at the hotel.
- René Strickler as Juventino "Juve" del Paso, Nicolás's best friend. He is married to Gabriela and is the father of Samuel and Gustavo.
- Mauricio Aspe as Mauricio Mijares, Victoria's fiancé who cancels their wedding. He is afraid of commitment and refuses to have children.
- María Sorté as Úrsula Pérez, Gabriela and Domingo's mother.
- Ana Tena as Alexa Paz Contreras, Nicolás' niece. She is always on social media and is obsessed with finding her first boyfriend.
- Charlotte Carter as Sofía Paz Contreras, Nicolás' youngest niece. The death of her parents makes her dyslexia disorder progress. She receives help from Victoria to overcome her disorder.
- Jason Romo as Hugo Montero, Rodrigo's son. His dream is to become a professional dancer but his father does not accept it.
- Santiago Zenteno as Father Domingo García Pérez, Gabriela's brother. He is a priest and also the principal of a school.
- Juan Vidal as Robertino Rodríguez Rodriguez "El Calamal", he is dedicated to money laundering and is the leader of a criminal gang.
- Bárbara Islas as Coral Palma del Mar, a receptionist at the hotel.
- Lalo Palacios as Manuel Gomiz "Manito", a bellboy at the hotel and also works as Alondra's driver.
- Mario Discua as Fabirú, the doorman and guard of the building where Nicolás lives.
- Paola Archer as Paulette
- Laureano Brizuela as Tato
- Moisés Zurman as Jaiba
- Eric Crum as Camarón
- Marcelo Bacerlo as Adrián
- Mónica Plehn as Natalia, Paulina's friend.
- Yhoana Marell as Bárbara
- Mauricio Arriaga as Samuel del Paso García, Gabriela and Juventino's son.
- Eivaut Richten as Nikolai
- Ruy Gaytán as Gustavo, del Paso García, Gabriela and Juventino's son.
- Paty Díaz as Leona Lenteja, a social worker in charge of observing Nicolás to make sure his nieces are living in good conditions. She will ally with Alondra, to take Nicolás' custody of the girls.
- Natasha Cubría as Paulina

=== Guest stars ===
- Karla Gómez as Cristina Contreras, Nicolás' sister. She is married to Antonio and is mother of Camila, Alexa, and Sofía.
- Víctor González as Antonio Paz, Cristina's husband and father of Camila, Alexa, and Sofía.

== Ratings ==
Viewership and ratings per season of Soltero con hijas
Season	Timeslot (CT)	Episodes	First aired		Last aired		Avg. viewers (millions)
Season	Timeslot (CT)	Episodes	Date	Viewers (millions)	Date	Viewers (millions)	Avg. viewers (millions)
1	Mon–Fri 8:30pm	87	28 October 2019	3.1	23 February 2020	3.9	TBD

== Episodes ==
No.	Title	Mexico air date	U.S. air date	Mexico viewers (millions)	U.S. viewers (millions)
1	"Siempre fiestero, pero siempre cumplidero"	28 October 2019	24 January 2022	3.1	1.96
Nicolás is a single guy without commitments. Victoria is a psychiatrist who seeks to fulfill her dream of being a mother and having a family. Nicolás and Victoria meet at a bakery at a very busy time, because Nicolás is looking for a birthday cake for Sofia, his youngest niece, and Victoria buys a cake for her bachelorette party. In a moment of anger, Victoria, along with Ileana, decide to deflate the tires of Nicolás' car, because it hinders him to get out. Nicolás arrives at Sofia's party, along with the cake, but he brings a cake with the wrong name, and a piñata from the soccer team to which his niece is not a follower. His sister Cristina confronts him for being careless and very clueless. Hours later, Nicolás invites Juventino, his neighbor, to a party he organizes in his apartment, but Gabriela, Juventino's wife, discovers her husband set the party. The next morning, Nicolás sees Victoria, which they show chemistry for the second time. During the ride along the Pie de la Cuesta road, Acapulco, Antonio begins to suffer a heart attack while driving, with Cristina in the passenger seat, but loses control of the steering wheel while his strike intensifies, causing them to tip over a curve.
2	"Ellas solo te tienen a ti"	29 October 2019	25 January 2022	3.3	1.76
After losing control of the vehicle, Antonio and Gabriela turn until they fall down a small cliff, wake up injured and Gabriela cannot move, her husband crawls to where she is and assures her that everything will be fine and swears that she and her daughters are what he loves most in life. Later, Antonio dies in the arms of his wife. Meanwhile, in the lobby of the building, Nico and Victoria discuss and insult each other until they realize that they both live in the same building and if that were not enough, they are close neighbors. Nico arrives to work at the hotel but unexpectedly receives a call to his cell phone with bad news. Victoria tries on the wedding dresses very excited about the big day of her wedding, but Mauricio, her fiancé, apologizes to her, since he can't get married. Meanwhile, Nico arrives at the hospital, the doctor confirms that his brother-in-law died at the scene of the accident and that his sister is in critical condition. In that, the girls arrive desperately asking for their parents. Later, Nico and the girls enter to say goodbye to their mother, on her deathbed, Cristina orders Nico to her daughters and assures him that he will be a great father.
3	"Como si fueran mis hijas"	30 October 2019	26 January 2022	2.9	1.59
After the tragic accident where Cristina and Antonio lost their lives, all acquaintances give their condolences to the family and the girls dedicate emotional words to their parents. Upon returning from the funeral, Nico informs his nieces that he will stay with them that night, while deciding what to do with their lives going forward. Meanwhile, Nico serves dinner for the girls, El Calamal knocks on the door, with an embargo order. Nico is enraged by Calamal's imprudence and he is beaten. This causes things to get worse, and El Calamal reacts by taking them out of the house at that moment. Nico decides to take the girls to his apartment, but leaving the elevator, they meet Victoria who had previously discussed with the girls' uncle. Sofia, as soon as she sees her, reacts by running to hug her. Nico gives no explanation of what happened to Victoria and they both go their way. Camila talks to her uncle and lets him know that he is too immature to take care of them.
4	"A pesar del dolor, la vida puede seguir siendo bonita"	31 October 2019	27 January 2022	2.9	1.90
Victoria and Ileana have breakfast at a restaurant, but they see Mauricio, while he meets another woman whom he greets very affectionately. That makes Victoria feel even more shattered, but she holds her tears and goes straight to her ex-fiance to smear a cake slice in his face. Meanwhile, at the girls' school, Nico receives the bad news that his sister and brother-in-law have a debt of more than six months of tuition pending. Unable to pay the debt, Nico is on his way home to tell the girls to change schools. Upon returning to the building, Don Efraín sees Nico entering his apartment with Camila and calls the police to report him for sexual harassment of minors. Later, Nico gives the news of the school change to the girls, but they react depressingly. Alexa locks herself in the bathroom and ensures that she will not leave, she will stay to see all the memes she finds on social media, until Nico assures her that she will stay in her usual school. When the police arrive due to Don Efraín's complaint, Nicolás tries to explain that it is a misunderstanding and that the girls are his nieces, but he can't until Victoria arrives to help him.
5	"¡Nico invita a cenar a Victoria!"	1 November 2019	28 January 2022	2.7	1.60
Victoria goes out to talk to Nico about the misunderstanding that her father made happen and she asks for an apology. To accept her apology, Nico proposes a condition that she agrees to go out to dinner with him at night. Nico arrives at the apartment, and surprises his nieces by glueing drawings and decorating the entire room, which Nico explodes with fury. The girls ask their uncle for a space so they can have their privacy, to which Nico tells them to adapt the office of his apartment to make one more bedroom, which the girls will have to share. At nightfall, Nico arrives at the restaurant agreed with Victoria and when he sees her arrive he is shocked in a pleasant way, seeing the beauty that she carries. During dinner, Nico receives a warning letter, saying that he has to pay the debt if he does not want to piss off Calamal, who turns out to be sitting at a table next to him, and again, Victoria sees Mauricio with the woman that he was having breakfast before, which Mauricio discovers Victoria having dinner with Nico, and makes Victoria a jealous scene. Nico seeing Mauricio attacking Victoria, tells her that he has been interested in Victoria and kisses her on the cheek, to which Mauricio retires with the woman from the restaurant.
6	"Respiración de boca a boca"	4 November 2019	31 January 2022	2.9	1.70
The next day, Nico takes his nieces to see the new school where they will study. Later, he takes them with him to work and there, Camila meets Juan Diego again. All hotel officials, along with Victoria and her father, are nervous about the arrival of Rodrigo Montero, owner of the hotel and Victoria's former love. Rodrigo finally arrives, but everyone is surprised to see that he is not the person they expected, but Hugo, Rodrigo's young son, who turns out to be the true owner. During the awards ceremony, Nicolás awards Victoria the corresponding prize and it turns out that someone changed the prize for an apron. At that moment, Rodrigo comes to calm the situation, so Victoria gets nervous. After the problem, the hotel owner scolds and demands that Nicolás find the culprit. Later, Victoria feels embarrassed by the situation, which she tries to leave but meets Rodrigo. When he turns around, he meets Nicolás and passes out falling into the pool. The two men throw themselves into the pool and save Victoria, then Nico gives her mouth to mouth breathing.
7	"De ahora en adelante soy su tutor"	5 November 2019	1 February 2022	3.0	1.76
Nico and Victoria talk about the incident she suffered at the pool. In that, Ileana appears to interrupt and Nico recognizes her as the person who deflated the tires of his car. Later, Victoria arrives at Nicolás's apartment with some cookies as a peace truce, at the same time a group of girls visit Nico. Confused by what is going on, Sofia gives notice that her sister escaped. Instantly, Nico goes to look for Camila at the beach, entrusting her nieces with Victoria. Camila is with Juandi spying on the turtle egg thieves on the beach, but when trying to stop them, El Calamal appears, who threatens to disappear them into the sea if they get back into his business. At that moment, Nico arrives and again confronts his enemy. El Calamal warns him that if he does not pay the first part of his sister's debt, his daughters will pay for him. Special guest stars: Emir Pabón as himself
8	"Santo que no es visto, no es adorado"	6 November 2019	3 February 2022	2.8	1.66
Victoria feels alone, but Ileana encourages her to look for love. Rodrigo scolds Nico for his skirt chasing.
9	"San Antonio"	7 November 2019	4 February 2022	2.9	1.74
The Captain presses Victoria to get married. Nico confronts Rodrigo and, therefore, asks his neighbor for help.
10	"El rey de la pista"	8 November 2019	7 February 2022	3.2	1.78
Victoria and Nico are in a club and he takes her out to dance, although they don't do very well. Alexa gets drunk at Samuel's house.
11	"¡Nico malo!"	11 November 2019	8 February 2022	3.1	1.63
The social worker Leona Lenteja visits Nico to see if he is fit to take care of the girls. Rodrigo fires Nico from the hotel.
12	"Romeo y Julieta"	12 November 2019	9 February 2022	3.0	1.56
Victoria tries to comfort Nico with a hug, but he rejects her. Later, both represent a play with everything and kisses. Special guest stars: Juan Osorio and Emilio Osorio as themselves
13	"El casting"	13 November 2019	10 February 2022	3.2	1.56
The girls audition for the role of Juliet while an infection attacks the hotel.
14	"Un vacío en mi corazón"	14 November 2019	11 February 2022	3.2	1.40
Victoria learns that she can't have children. Rodrigo agrees to give Nico a new opportunity.
15	"Por fin van a conocer a Masha Simonova"	15 November 2019	14 February 2022	3.0	1.74
Masha is about to arrive to Acapulco. Gabriela asks Juventino to leave the house and Rodrigo questions Nico about Victoria.
16	"Problemas de acné"	18 November 2019	15 February 2022	2.9	1.63
Alexa wakes up with a severe acne problem, she goes to the dermatologist, and Victoria helps her by preparing an acne mask. The social worker goes to Nico's department to inspect the pantry and household conditions. When the worker asks Nico where the furniture for her nieces are, the doorbell rings, and to Nico's unexpected surprise is the furniture Victoria acquired. Victoria helps Nico arrange the furniture for the girls and he apologizes for how he has behaved with her lately.
17	"El incendio"	19 November 2019	16 February 2022	2.9	1.54
Nikolai looks for Colonel Robles at his home, but only to warn Masha that he and his daughter live in Acapulco. Ileana invites Victoria to her house for dinner, but the night gets out of control when her ex-husband and Juandi's dad causes a fire from outside Ilenas's house and blocks all the doors of the house in order to achieve his mission. Desperate, Ileana and Victoria begin to ask for help, just like Juandi, but they never imagine that Rodrigo would save them.
18	"Victoria se va a casar con… ¡Nicolás Contreras!"	20 November 2019	16 February 2022	3.0	1.54
Nico makes a pact with his nieces. Rodrigo confesses to Victoria that he loves her and hates her at the same time. Nico and Victoria will have a naval wedding.
19	"Creo que me estoy enamorando"	21 November 2019	17 February 2022	3.1	1.68
Nico and Victoria get married and accept that something happens between them, more if they seal it with a big kiss of love. Ileana confesses the truth to Juandi.
20	"La maestra Masha Simonova"	22 November 2019	17 February 2022	3.0	1.68
Masha arrives in Acapulco to do business at the hotel, but her presence will alter Nico, Victoria and the Captain himself.
21	"Va a ser una noche explosiva"	25 November 2019	18 February 2022	2.9	1.50
Because of a photo montage of Alexa that is leaked on social media, Leona takes away custody of her from Nico. Juandi's father appears. Masha and Victoria face each other.
22	"Voy a luchar por ustedes"	26 November 2019	18 February 2022	3.0	1.50
Leona takes Alexa, but Nico swears that he will do everything possible to return her to the family. Victoria and Rodrigo fight.
23	"Este amor que sentimos"	27 November 2019	21 February 2022	2.9	1.71
Nico and Victoria confess their feelings and both agree to give their best. Camila tells Juandi that she feels something for Hugo.
24	"Nicolás Contreras, ¿quieres casarte conmigo?"	28 November 2019	22 February 2022	2.8	1.70
Victoria proposes marriage to Nico to help recover Alexa. Masha seduces Nico and El Calamal reveals his true identity to Juandi.
25	"¿Quieres ser mi novia?"	29 November 2019	23 February 2022	2.8	1.64
Nico makes a romantic proposal to Victoria. El Calamal sends a notification to Ileana. Masha is the Captain's daughter.
26	"El juicio de Alexa"	2 December 2019	25 February 2022	2.5	1.40
Judgment day arrives. Nico and Victoria try to recover Alexa. Masha manages to find the girls' grandmother.
27	"Nuestra última esperanza"	3 December 2019	28 February 2022	2.9	1.63
Nico asks Alondra for help to save the girls. Isabel gives birth to a girl. Victoria makes a decision that will change her life.
28	"Una sorpresa que cambiará sus vidas"	4 December 2019	1 March 2022	2.6	1.52
Masha flirts with Nico to separate him from Victoria. Alexa re-records a video that alters the family. Juandi rejects Calamal.
29	"Traicionaste nuestra confianza"	5 December 2019	2 March 2022	2.7	1.64
Victoria sees a picture of Nico and Masha kissing and confronts him. Masha decides to stay in Acapulco. Camila and Hugo are already dating.
30	"La verdad siempre sale a la luz"	6 December 2019	3 March 2022	2.9	1.55
Ileana is arrested. Juandi declares his feelings to Camila. A family adopts Alexa. Samuel confesses his thefts.
31	"El enemigo de todos"	9 December 2019	4 March 2022	2.6	TBA
El Calamal filters everyone's engaging images and fights Nico for Juandi. Nico apologizes to Victoria and swears there will be no more lies.
32	"No quiero estorbos"	10 December 2019	7 March 2022	2.7	1.58
Nico tries to save Alexa from her adoptive parents. Masha demands that Calamal get out of his way. Victoria suffers a painful loss.
33	"Orden de restricción"	11 December 2019	8 March 2022	2.1	1.60
Doña Alondra humiliates Victoria and takes the custody of the girls from Nico. Juandi makes a pact with Calamal. Ileana pleads guilty.
34	"Tu amor me hace débil"	12 December 2019	9 March 2022	2.4	1.54
Nico breaks up with Victoria. The Captain receives terrible news. El Calamal shows Masha that they can be great allies.
35	"Tu dolor es mi dolor"	13 December 2019	10 March 2022	2.5	1.40
Rodrigo comforts Victoria for her break up with Nico. Doña Alondra puts Nico in a position to see the girls. Victoria confronts her father to know his secret.
36	"Tortura del destino"	16 December 2019	11 March 2022	2.5	1.53
Victoria is surprised to see that the great love of the Captain looks like Masha. Rodrigo confronts Nico and Mrs. Alondra tells why she moved away from the girls.
37	"Todos necesitamos un comienzo"	17 December 2019	14 March 2022	2.7	1.49
Ileana gets out of prison. Masha asks for Gabriela's dismissal. Doña Alondra faces Calamal. Doña Úrsula kisses the Captain.
38	"El último abrazo de nuestra vida"	18 December 2019	15 March 2022	3.0	1.52
Nico moves to the cellar, where he will be 'attacked' by a rat. Juve and Gabriela reconcile and Masha will not stay idly by.
39	"Esta batalla apenas comienza"	19 December 2019	16 March 2022	N/A	1.51
Doña Úrsula and Doña Alondra declare war. Victoria thinks she has seen Nico and Masha in a lustful situation. Rodrigo discovers that someone is spying on him.
40	"¡Se están peleando!"	20 December 2019	17 March 2022	N/A	1.51
Doña Alondra and Doña Úrsula face each other in the condominium elections. Rodrigo and Nico fight for Victoria. Masha confesses to being in love.
41	"Una señal del destino"	23 December 2019	18 March 2022	N/A	1.54
Hugo and Camila give their first kiss. Nico and Masha remain locked in a cellar. Rodrigo and Victoria spend a day together at sea.
42	"¡Rodrigo y Victoria se besan!"	24 December 2019	21 March 2022	N/A	1.77
Rodrigo and Victoria kiss, but she asks for time. Doña Alondra catches Hugo and Camila and scolds them. Christmas is about to hit the ground in Acapulco.
43	"Yo sí te digo las cosas de frente"	25 December 2019	22 March 2022	N/A	1.48
Victoria confronts Masha. Camila is sad about her injury. Juve is the new hotel manager. El Capitan discovers a terrible secret.
44	"Es hora de enfrentar las cosas"	26 December 2019	23 March 2022	N/A	1.53
Masha confirms that she is Claudia's daughter and Victoria wants them to have a DNA test. Rodrigo and Hugo give Victoria and Camila a serenade.
45	"¡San Nico!"	27 December 2019	25 March 2022	N/A	1.39
Nico disguises himself as Santa Claus to surprise his nieces and the Del Paso family. Victoria and Rodrigo toast together for Christmas.
46	"Ustedes son mis hijas"	30 December 2019	28 March 2022	N/A	1.39
Despite friction with Alondra, Nico strengthens his relationship with the girls. Victoria is worried about the DNA results.
47	"Tú y Masha son hermanas"	31 December 2019	29 March 2022	N/A	1.61
Victoria receives the DNA test verdict and reads it in front of Masha and Efrain. The result is positive; they are sisters.
48	"Yo amo y seguiré amando a Victoria"	1 January 2020	31 March 2022	N/A	1.47
Nico decides to be honest with Masha and tell him that he can never love her, because he is in love with Victoria.
49	"¿Por qué terminaste con ella?"	2 January 2020	1 April 2022	N/A	1.21
Ileana confronts Nico and asks him why he broke Victoria's heart. However, Nico cannot tell her the whole truth.
50	"Feliz año nuevo"	3 January 2020	4 April 2022	2.6	1.44
In the midst of conflicts, heartbreak and misunderstanding, everyone joins and celebrates the arrival of the new year.
51	"Solteras con tío"	6 January 2020	5 April 2022	2.6	1.41
Camila and Alexa end their love relationships. Rodrigo plans to ask Victoria for marriage. Ileana confesses her secret to Victoria.
52	"El Capitán sufre un infarto"	7 January 2020	6 April 2022	3.3	1.32
The Captain is attacked by some men and is found unconscious by Nico. Úrsula and Ileana confront Masha.
53	"Tengo que dar el golpe final"	8 January 2020	7 April 2022	3.6	1.42
Masha won't let anyone humiliate her, so she plans to kidnap the Paz sisters. Úrsula tells Rodrigo why Nico left Victoria.
54	"Ve por la mujer que amas"	9 January 2020	8 April 2022	3.4	1.46
Rodrigo confesses Nico's secret to Victoria and Nico tries to fix things. Masha kicks off her plan against the Paz sisters.
55	"El secuestro de las hermanas Paz"	10 January 2020	11 April 2022	3.5	1.51
El Calamal and Masha kidnap the girls and hurt Nico. Victoria and Ileana become sisters again. Alondra apologizes to Nico and Victoria.
56	"Lo más importante es la familia"	13 January 2020	12 April 2022	3.6	1.56
Victoria and Nico decide together to go to rescue the Paz sisters and all families come together for love.
57	"Hoy es el día de abrir ventanas al amor"	14 January 2020	13 April 2022	3.6	1.59
Nico assures Victoria that he will show her how much he loves her and she agrees to move on (with conditions). Juandi asks Camila to go out as a couple.
58	"Sola y abandonada"	15 January 2020	14 April 2022	3.5	1.34
Victoria and El Capitan visit Masha in jail, but Victoria is not willing to forgive her; Nico and Victoria confess their love, but they won't be dating yet.
59	"El radical cambio de look de Camila"	16 January 2020	15 April 2022	3.4	1.21
Camila seeks her true self and begins with a physical change; Nico is willing to leave singleness and win back Victoria. Alexa offers an apology to Victoria for her behavior.
60	"El mejor postre de su vida"	17 January 2020	18 April 2022	3.5	1.52
Nico prepares Victoria a great surprise to formalize their relationship. Camila insults her grandmother. The Del Paso family live a curse.
61	"El anillo de compromiso"	20 January 2020	19 April 2022	3.5	1.54
Nico hides the ring in the cake, but Victoria swallows it, which she ends up in the hospital. Camila and Alondra fight again.
62	"Un salto de fe"	21 January 2020	21 April 2022	3.4	1.47
Nico takes Victoria to La Quebrada to show her that for love he would be able to throw himself and to ask her for marriage.
63	"Nico pide la mano de Victoria"	22 January 2020	22 April 2022	3.3	1.29
Nico asks the Captain if he gives her permission to marry Victoria; Rodrigo confesses to being in love with Ileana.
64	"Masha está arrepentida de todo el mal que hizo"	23 January 2020	25 April 2022	3.4	1.44
The Captain visits Masha in prison and she asks for forgiveness; Nico and Victoria set the wedding date.
65	"Despedida de solteros"	24 January 2020	26 April 2022	3.6	1.33
Nico and Victoria celebrate with their family, friends and much fun the end of their singleness; Ileana knows that between her and Rodrigo there can be nothing.
66	"Bienvenidos a una nueva vida"	27 January 2020	27 April 2022	3.7	1.48
Nico and Victoria end up having a mixed bachelor-bachelorette party and are ready to join their lives. Masha sends them a wedding gift.
67	"Los declaro marido y mujer"	28 January 2020	28 April 2022	3.9	1.51
Nico and Victoria marry in two beautiful ceremonies: one under the sea and one next to all their loved ones.
68	"La primera noche de casados"	29 January 2020	29 April 2022	3.1	1.23
Nico and Victoria spend their first day of marriage on a yacht. Juandi and Camila kiss and Masha will do everything to achieve forgiveness.
69	"Casados con hijas"	30 January 2020	2 May 2022	3.2	1.42
Nico, Victoria and the Paz sisters enjoy their vacations in Mexico City. Rodrigo declares his love to Ileana.
70	"Problemas en casa"	31 January 2020	3 May 2022	3.4	1.46
The first night as a family is not easy for Nico and Victoria, except when Alondra announces that now they must pay the girls' bills.
71	"¿Ya te arrepentiste?"	3 February 2020	4 May 2022	3.4	1.33
Nico is afraid of the arrival of a new baby, as with three girls he finds it enough to deal with.
72	"Acto de rebeldía"	4 February 2020	5 May 2022	3.8	1.25
Nico and Victoria are stressed by the girls attitude, but they ask them to understand them for everything they have lived. Ileana has a bad time on her date with Rodrigo.
73	"Los XV años de Alexa"	5 February 2020	6 May 2022	3.6	1.29
Nico tries to convince Emilio Marcos to perform at Alexa's party. Juventino quits the hotel. Masha could be very sick. Special guest stars: Juan Osorio and Emilio Osorio as themselves.
74	"Una hermosa quinceañera"	6 February 2020	9 May 2022	3.4	1.39
Emilio Marcos arrives to sing at Alexa's quinceañera party, where she presents Adrián as her boyfriend. Masha has Lyme disease. Special guest stars: Emilio Osorio as himself.
75	"Nuestro amor es inevitable"	7 February 2020	10 May 2022	3.4	1.26
Rodrigo and Ileana kiss; Hugo accepts their relationship, but he joins the Calamal to separate them. Victoria faints, which will be a sign of pregnancy.
76	"¡Marido rabo verde!"	10 February 2020	11 May 2022	3.2	1.28
Victoria finds Nico in a sensual photo shoot and punishes him. Rodrigo asks Ileana to be his girlfriend.
77	"La peor villana del cuento"	11 February 2020	12 May 2022	3.6	1.29
The mother superior expels both Alexa and Samuel from school and Juventino explodes against the Paz Contreras, causing both families to separate.
78	"Victoria está embarazada"	12 February 2020	13 May 2022	3.4	1.20
Victoria discovers that she is expecting a baby and Nico has all the symptoms of pregnancy. Masha's life is in danger.
79	"¡Estamos embarazados!"	13 February 2020	16 May 2022	3.4	1.28
Victoria and Nico announce to families about the baby they expect, but Sofia does not react very well. Masha is on the verge of death.
80	"Te perdono desde el fondo de mi corazón"	14 February 2020	17 May 2022	3.2	1.30
Victoria meets with Masha and accepts her apologies. Gaby and the mother superior fight. Nico demands Alexa to close her channel.
81	"Camila y Juandi tienen su primera vez"	17 February 2020	18 May 2022	3.7	1.27
Camila and Juandi consume their love on the boat. Victoria could be expecting more than one baby. Ileana suffers in her appearance in society.
82	"La gran maestra Masha Simonova"	18 February 2020	19 May 2022	3.8	1.30
Masha murders the doctor and escapes from the hospital. Nico and Victoria will be parents of twins. Camila is attacked on social media.
83	"Ocho meses después"	19 February 2020	23 May 2022	3.5	1.32
El Calamal tries to kill Ilieana and joins forces with Masha. The Paz Contreras family enjoys a day at the beach.
84	"Victoria y los bebés corren riesgo de muerte"	20 February 2020	24 May 2022	4.0	1.27
El Calamal tries to kill Ileana, but Victoria gets in the way and her and the twins lives are in danger.
85	"Masha secuestra al bebé de Nico y Victoria"	21 February 2020	25 May 2022	3.9	1.45
Masha has already started her revenge against Nico and Victoria by stealing her son from the hospital. Coral is discovered by the Del Paso.
86	"Cada segundo cuenta"	23 February 2020	27 May 2022	3.9	1.25 1.41
87	"Casado y con cinco hijos"	23 February 2020	30 May 2022	3.9	1.25 1.41
Nico and Victoria are desperate for their baby, but Coral manages to drug Masha and gives him back in an act of faith. El Calamal kidnaps Juandi. Victoria organizes Nico a party for his birthday, but Masha arrives to destroy them. Every family will finally be happy.

== Awards and nominations ==
Year	Award	Category	Nominated	Result
2020	TVyNovelas Awards	Best Telenovela of the Year	Juan Osorio	Nominated
2020	TVyNovelas Awards	Best Actress	Vanessa Guzmán	Nominated
2020	TVyNovelas Awards	Best Actor	Gabriel Soto	Nominated
2022	Premios Juventud	My Favorite Actor	Gabriel Soto	Nominated
2023	Premios Juventud	My Favorite Actor	Gabriel Soto	Won
