= Jesús Moré =

Mexican actor (born 1979)

- Born: 8 March 1979 (age 46); León, Guanajuato, Mexico
- Occupation: Actor
- Years active: 2007–present

Jesús Moré (born 8 March 1979) is a Mexican actor. Born in Mexico and currently resides in Los Angeles, United States. He is an actor graduated from the Centro de Educación Artística of Televisa, he started his career making recurring roles in Televisa telenovelas. He made himself known thanks to the Telemundo series El Señor de los Cielos, where he plays Omar Terán.

== Filmography ==
Television roles
Year	Title	Role	Notes
2007	¿Y ahora qué hago?	Director	Episode: "Crisis de la edad adulta"
2008–2009	Cuidado con el ángel	Vicente	72 episodes
2009–2010	Camaleones	Enrique Garcia Rivero	112 episodes
2010–2011	Cuando me enamoro	Diego Lara	22 episodes
2011	La fuerza del destino	Ingeniero Orozco	14 episodes
2012–2014	Como dice el dicho	Joaco / Luis	2 episodes
2013	Durmiendo con mi jefe	Adrián Urrutia	18 episodes
2013	La mujer del Vendaval	Miguel	14 episodes
2013	De que te quiero, te quiero	Oliverio	21 episodes
2015–2018	El Señor de los Cielos	Omar Terán	326 episodes (seasons 3, 4, 5–6)
2016	Entre dos	Himself	Episode: "Soap Opera Star"
2016	El Chema	Omar Terán	4 episodes
2017	La Fan	Franco Villar	3 episodes
2017	Milagros de Navidad	Ronald	Episode: "Perra Navidad"
2021	La suerte de Loli	Salvador Bravo "El Renegado"	
2022	El último rey	Gerardo Fernández	
2024	El amor no tiene receta	Humberto	
2025	La Jefa	Mauricio Domínguez	Main cast
