= List of La Madrastra characters =

The promotional poster for La Madrastra, which depicts thirteen of the main characters. In the center and top left: María (Victoria Ruffo). At the bottom, from left to right: Carmela (Margarita Isabel), Servando (Lorenzo de Rodas), Alba (Jacqueline Andere), Esteban (César Évora), Fabiola (Sabine Moussier), Bruno (René Casados), Daniela (Cecilia Gabriela), and Demetrio (Guillermo García Cantú). In the top right, clockwise from bottom: Leonel (Eduardo Capetillo), Héctor (Mauricio Aspe), Estrella (Ana Layevska), and Ángel (Miguel Ángel Biaggio).

La Madrastra is a Mexican telenovela that aired on El Canal de las Estrellas in 2005. The program's main character is María Fernández Acuña, a woman who returns to Mexico after spending 20 years in prison for a murder she didn't commit only to find that her children believe that she is dead and that the picture of an unknown woman hanging above their fireplace is their mother. The telenovela follows María's attempts to regain her children's love without telling them who she really is, her complicated relationship with her ex-husband, Esteban, and her quest to find out which of her former friends really killed Patricia. Including María, the main cast consists of approximately twenty-five characters, as well as other recurring or minor characters.

== Main characters ==
=== María ===
María Fernández Acuña (Victoria Ruffo), the series protagonist, is wrongly sentenced to life in prison after her friend, Patricia, is murdered in Aruba. After twenty years, María is released for good behavior and returns to Mexico City to confront her husband and friends who abandoned her, and to reunite with her two children, Héctor and Estrella. Despite originally doubting her innocence, María rekindles her relationship with Esteban, and they remarry so that she can be closer to her children, whom she fears to tell that she is their mother until she has cleared her name. However, María's children resent her and consider her to be their wicked stepmother who is trying to usurp their mother's rightful place. After María's name is cleared, she and Esteban finally tell their children the truth, and María is reunited with her children as their mother at long last.

=== The Suspects ===
- Esteban San Román (César Évora), an important and wealthy businessman, divorced María after she was convicted of Patricia's murder, told their young children that their mother had died in an accident, and erected a portrait of another woman above their mantle. He also adopts a third child, Ángel, who is really the illegitimate son of his aunt Carmela, to avoid scandal. Despite the fact that he is engaged to Ana Rosa, Esteban quickly finds himself attracted to María once more and remarries her so that she can be closer to their children. After the discovery of a letter that incriminates him in Patricia's murder, an Aruban court finds him guilty of the crime and sentences him to death; he is saved literally minutes before his execution, and when he returns to Mexico he informs his children that María is their real mother.
- Alba San Román (Jacqueline Andere), one of Esteban's aunts, and her sister Carmela raised Esteban following his parents' deaths. About twenty years ago, Alba had an affair with Demetrio, who was also sleeping with Carmela; subsequently, both women became pregnant, and when Alba's child was stillborn, she switched infants with her sister and then allowed Esteban to raise the child, Ángel, to avoid scandal. Despite their blood relation, Alba harbors a forbidden love for Esteban and thus loathes all of the women who are in love with him, including María and Patricia. After being rejected by Esteban, Alba falsely accuses Esteban of murdering Patricia and then commits suicide by jumping from the roof of the San Román mansion. In the alternate ending, Alba frees Esteban from prison after she decides that she has to turn a new leaf, and after she is forgiven by all that she has harmed, she decides to leave Mexico for some time.
- Bruno Mendizábal (René Casados), an ambitious man with a penchant for eyeliner, is one of Esteban's business associates. He is husband of Fabiola, who married him out of convenience after Esteban rejected her. They had one son who was born with severe physical deformities as a result of their abuse of alcohol, tobacco, and drugs; they subsequently abandoned him in a Canadian institution, only paying for his care. Patricia eventually came to learn this secret, thus providing him with motive for her murder. However, it is eventually revealed that Bruno was having a passionate affair with Patricia at the time of her death, and that she was pregnant with his child when she died. Two decades later, Bruno and Fabiola maintain a conspicuous, glamorous lifestyle. However, following their son's death, Bruno and Fabiola's marriage begins to deteriorate rapidly. In the original airing, the couple realize that they are in love and agree to become better people, with Bruno removing his trademark make-up and abandoning his obsession with his image. In the 2007 ending, Fabiola stabs Bruno to death in a fit of insanity after he discovers that she murdered Patricia.
- Fabiola de Mendizábal (Sabine Moussier), a haughty and arrogant woman, is married to Bruno, whom she wed after her fiancé Esteban left her and married María. Twenty years ago, Fabiola gave birth to a son who suffered from extreme birth defects as a result of her and Bruno's wild lifestyle of alcohol, tobacco, and drug use. Horrified, the couple placed him in an institution in Canada; they never visited their child and swore to never speak of him again. Two decades later, Fabiola remains in love with Esteban and schemes to win him back. However, after her and Bruno's son dies, she becomes wracked with guilt. In the original 2005 airing, Fabiola leaves Bruno, only for the two to realize that they really do love one another; they reunite and pledge to become better people, leaving the glamorous personalities that they had created behind them. However, in the alternate airing, Fabiola is revealed to be Patricia's murderer, and she stabs Bruno to death in a fit of insanity after he learns of her guilt. After attacking María, Fabiola is placed in a mental institution.
- Daniela ex de Rivero (Cecilia Gabriela), a fragile woman with a propensity to tears, is married to Demetrio, the corporate lawyer at the Empresas San Román. Demetrio was previously married to Daniela's sister, Sofía, who was engulfed by madness after becoming addicted to pills. Daniela allowed her sister to overdose; after Sofía's death, she married her former brother-in-law and took in Sofía's daughter, Ana Rosa. Despite her emotional sensitivity, Daniela is an ambitious woman and encourages Ana Rosa's relationship with Esteban, despite the fact that she herself secretly harbors romantic feelings for Esteban. Daniela is devastated to learn that Demetrio fathered a child, Ángel, with another woman and tries to save their marriage, but ultimately leaves Demetrio when she learns that he has been sexually abusing Ana Rosa since she was a young girl
- Demetrio Rivero (Guillermo García Cantú) is a lawyer at the Empresas San Román, and is frequently regarded by many of the series' characters as a failure of a man. Much of Demetrio's assets are the result of his first marriage to his current wife Daniela's sister, Sofía; Demetrio's investments and business deals frequently go awry, and as a result he embezzled a significant amount of money from the Empresas San Román about twenty years ago. In the original ending, it is revealed that Patricia discovered several of Demetrio's secrets: his embezzlement; his affairs with Alba and Carmela, the latter of which resulted in the birth of Ángel; and the fact that he is a crossdresser. As a result, Demetrio murdered Patricia to keep his secrets safe. After Demetrio's crimes are revealed to the audience, he quickly spirals into insanity and is arrested after attempting to murder Bruno, Fabiola, María, and Esteban. In the 2007 ending, Demetrio reunites with Ángel and Carmela as a family in the finale.
- Carmela San Román (Margarita Isabel), one of Estaban's aunts, and her sister Alba raised their nephew following his parents' deaths. Carmela has always been weaker than Alba and is frequently manipulated into doing her bidding. Twenty years ago, Carmela had an affair with Demetrio, unaware that he was also sleeping with Alba; subsequently, both women became pregnant, and Carmela believed that her child died, while Esteban raised Alba's son, Ángel. However, following a relapse of leukemia, Carmela learns that Alba switched infants, and that Ángel is really her son. Carmela happily reunites with her son and renounces her sister.
- Servando Maldonado (Lorenzo de Rodas) is the miserly business associate of Esteban who falsely provided testimony against María in Patricia's murder trial twenty years ago because he was in love with María and hated her for not reciprocating his emotions. After learning that he is dying, Servando hides numerous letters confessing the true murderer's identity and arranges to divide his considerable fortune between his mute maid, Venturina, and the stepbrother he had abused as a child, Rufino " El Pulpo" Sánchez. Servando is smothered to death by an off-screen Demetrio, who fears that he will reveal his identity, but the other characters assume that he died of natural causes. After his death, one of Servando's letters is discovered and implicates Esteban in Patricia's murder as a means of hurting María yet again; it is turned over to the police, and as a result Esteban is extradited to Aruba, where he is tried for Patricia's murder. In the alternate ending, Servando dies of natural causes.

=== The youth ===
- Leonel Ibáñez (Eduardo Capetillo) is the son of Patricia and Arturo who was orphaned at a young age after his mother was murdered and his father subsequently died of a broken heart. Esteban took the young boy under his wing, telling him that his mother had died in an accident. Leonel falls in love with María when she returns to Mexico, unaware that she has spent the last twenty years in prison for his mother's murder. After María remarries Esteban, Leonel eventually reciprocates his secretary Lupita's feelings, and they are married in the finale.
- Ana Rosa Márquez (Martha Julia) is the twenty-something fiancée of Esteban who was raised by her aunt Daniela following the death of her mother, Sofía; both Sofía and Daniela have been married to Demetrio, who has sexually abused Ana Rosa since she was a young girl due to her resemblance to her deceased mother (also portrayed by Julia). Ana Rosa and Daniela scheme together to secure Ana Rosa's marriage to the wealthy Esteban, despite the fact that Ana Rosa continues a relationship with the social-climbing Carlos. Ana Rosa shows signs of being afflicted by the same madness that claimed her mother and shoots Esteban in an attempt to murder María, but after a stint in a psychiatric clinic Ana Rosa turns over a new leaf and attempts to become a better person. She discovers a videocassette revealing Patricia's murderer and attempts to turn it over to the Aruban authorities, but she is lured to an abandoned warehouse and murdered by Demetrio before she can expose him. In the alternate ending, Ana Rosa has a happy ending and is in a committed relationship with Dr. Ruiz.
- Héctor San Román (Mauricio Aspe) is the son of María and Esteban. An executive at his father's company, Héctor becomes determined to prove his independence from his father when Esteban becomes engaged to Ana Rosa, and again when Esteban marries María, because he loathes the idea of a stepmother. Héctor briefly warms to María when she pays off his debt from a business transaction gone wrong, but he eventually turns against her once more after Alba accuses María of assault. Héctor marries Vivian, María's former cellmate, when she becomes pregnant, but remains concerned that she is having an affair with Greco and thus begins an affair with Angélica during his wedding reception and begins drinking heavily. Vivian leaves Héctor after discovering his infidelity, but Héctor realizes his errors and convinces Vivian to forgive him before she leaves the country.
- Estrella San Román (Ana Layevska) is the capricious, willful daughter of María and Esteban. Estrella becomes entangled in a love triangle with the villainous, abusive, gold-digging Carlos and her private biotechnology professor, the sweet, stuttering Greco. After a series of machinations from Carlos, Estrella chooses Greco and marries him in the finale. Like her older brother, Estrella is repulsed by the idea of a stepmother and initially rejects María, but eventually accepts her after Esteban reveals that she is her mother.
- Ángel San Román (Miguel Ángel Biaggio) is the product of an adulterous affair between Carmela and Demetrio, but is raised to believe that his parents are Esteban and Montserrat, the woman in the portrait, so as to avoid scandal. A sickly child, Ángel is the only one of Esteban's three children to accept María as a stepmother. In turn, María helps Ángel to grow into a self-confident young man; he elopes with Alma, one of the San Román secretaries, and moves out of Esteban's home. Ángel is devastated to learn that Esteban is not his father and is horrified to be told that Alba and Demetrio are his real parents. However, it is eventually revealed that Carmela is Ángel's real mother, and they are happily reunited as mother and son.
- Carlos Sánchez (Sergio Mayer) is the son of Pulpo who has recently returned to Mexico after an extended stay in the United States. Carlos returns an abusive, power- and money-hungry young man who is ashamed of his impoverished beginnings in Xochimilco and tells everyone that his father, El Pulpo, is deceased. He blackmails Ana Rosa, who is simultaneously engaged to Esteban and having an affair with Carlos, and also develops plans to marry Esteban's daughter, Estrella, and get his hands on the San Román fortune. After all of his plans are foiled and Estrella leaves him, Ana Rosa convinces Carlos to turn over a new leaf, as she has done. Carlos makes amends with Estrella and Greco before dying to save his father's life. In the alternate ending, Carlos is seen at the wedding alongside his father.
- Lupita Montes de Ibáñez (Mariana Ríos) is the daughter of Da Vinci and Socorro, and the older sister of Greco. Lupita is the executives' secretary at the Empresas San Román and harbors an unrequited love for one of her bosses, Leonel, despite Carlos's initial attempts to rekindle their former relationship. After much heartache, Leonel eventually reciprocates Lupita's feelings, and the two are married in the finale.
- Greco Montes (José Luis Reséndez) is the son of Da Vinci and Socorro, and the younger brother of Lupita. Greco is a shy, stuttering young man who enjoys working with the earth as a florist; however, in order to help his family out financially, Greco takes a job as a private professor of biotechnology for Lupita's boss's daughter, Estrella San Román. Although Greco initially finds Estrella to be unserious and infuriating, he eventually develops a crush on her and becomes entangled in a love triangle with her and Carlos. Estrella eventually chooses to be with Greco, however, and they are married in the finale.
- Vivian Sousa de San Román (Michelle Vieth) is María's cellmate in Aruba who was also imprisoned for a crime that she did not commit; María's lawyer, Luciano, manages to free Vivian, as well, and she moves to María's homeland of Mexico. Vivian quickly becomes attracted to María's son, Héctor, and becomes pregnant with his child; they marry, despite the fact that Héctor falsely fears that Vivian is having an affair with Greco. A pregnant Vivian decides to leave Mexico after discovering that Héctor has been having an affair with Angélica, but he convinces her to give him a second chance, and they reunite.
- Alma Martínez de San Román (Ximena Herrera) is a new secretary at the Empresas who quickly falls in love with the sickly, insecure Ángel. They begin dating, much to the consternation of Alba, who feels that a mere secretary is not good enough for her San Román nephew. After Alba attempts to pay Alma to leave Ángel, Ángel leaves the San Román mansion, and he and Alma elope with only Leonel, Lupita and Demetrio present. They renew their vows in a formal Catholic wedding in the finale.

=== Xochimilco residents ===
- Padre Belisario (Joaquín Cordero) is a Roman Catholic priest in Mexico City; the majority of the program's characters are parishioners at his church in Xochimilco. Father Belisario was the only person to believe in María's innocence twenty years ago and provides her with emotional support when she returns to Mexico only to find that her children believe that she is dead.
- Socorro de Montes (Ana Martín) is an artisan who lives in Xochimilco with her husband, Da Vinci, and their two children, Lupita and Greco. Socorro disapproves of her husband's friendship with Pulpo, whom she considers to be a bad influence, and frequently provides advice and emotional support to her children in their complicated love lives. Socorro also befriends María, and she works alongside María, Vivian, and la Duquesa in María's silver workshop.
- Leonardo "DaVinci" Montes (Arturo García Tenorio) is the husband of Socorro and the father of Lupita and Greco. A poor artist living in Xochimilco, Da Vinci spends much of his day goofing off and betting on horse races with Pulpo, much to his wife Socorro's dismay. Socorro briefly believes that Da Vinci is cheating on her with Venturina, but in reality Venturina is helping Da Vinci to plan his and Socorro's twenty-fifth anniversary celebration.
- Rufino Sánchez (Carlos Bonavides), whom most characters refer to as El Pulpo (English: The Octopus), is the father of Carlos and the stepbrother of Servando. A lazy but good-hearted widower who spends most of his time goofing off with his friend Da Vinci, Pulpo is rejected by his only son, Carlos, who is ashamed of his humble upbringing, only to inherit a significant fortune from Servando Maldonado, his estranged, abusive stepbrother. After Servando's death, Pulpo forms a new family with Servando's mute maid, Venturina, and the four young homeless boys he befriends and adopts. Pulpo reconciles with Carlos when the latter is stabbed protecting his father's life.
- Venturina García (Patricia Reyes Spíndola) is Servandon's faithful mute maid and frequent confidant. When Servando discovers that he is dying, he arranges to leave half of his fortune to Venturina and the other half to his stepbrother, El Pulpo. After Servando's death, Venturina moves in with Pulpo and helps him to raise the four homeless boys that he befriended.
- La Duquesa (Irma Serrano), or the Duchess in English, is the manager of a restaurant in Xochilmico, Fonda Versailles (Versailles Inn). She is friends with María and the residents of Xochilmico and often offers sage advice to her patrons and friends.

== Recurring characters ==
- Patricia de Ibáñez (Montserrat Olivier) was María's dear friend who was murdered twenty years ago in Aruba, and for whose murder María was subsequently incarcerated. In reality, Patricia was a cruel and scheming woman who married her adoring husband, Arturo, out of convenience and never wanted her son, Leonel. While outwardly pretending to be María's friend, Patricia secretly schemed to steal Esteban for herself while carrying on affairs with Demetrio and Bruno, the latter of whom got her pregnant. In the first version of the novela, Patricia is murdered by Demetrio after she threatens to reveal that he is a cross-dresser, that he had affairs with Alba and Carmela that resulted in both women becoming pregnant, and that he embezzled money from the Empresas San Román. In the second version, Fabiola murders Patricia in order to rid herself of a rival for Esteban's affection and because Patricia threatens to reveal the existence of the deformed baby that Fabiola and Bruno abandoned in a Canadian institution.
- Rebeca Robles (Liza Willert) is the San Románs' maid and Alba's frequent accomplice in her attempts to undermine María's position as the lady of the house. Towards the end of the series, she tries to blackmail Alba in to giving her a large sum of money in exchange for helping her to lock up all of the mansion's inhabitants, and Alba, in response, poisons Rebeca's wine with rat poison, subsequently killing the maid in graphic and gruesome fashion. In the alternate ending, Rebeca quits working for the San Romans after she is fed up with Alba's bitterness, which influences Alba to turn over a new leaf and become a better person.
- Luciano Cerezuela (Archy Lanfranco) Luciano is María's lawyer who worked tirelessly for twenty years to free his client from prison. During that time, Luciano came to love María, but María claimed to be unable to love romantically after her incarceration. Luciano also manages to free Vivian, María's innocent cellmate, from prison and comes to Mexico City with hopes of winning María's love. Luciano discovers the killer's true identity, but is shot by Demetrio/Fabiola in Father Belisario's sacristy before he can go to the police.
- Gerardo Salgado (Marcelo Buquet) is a businessman who engages in a series of business transactions with the Empresas San Román. His primary point of reference at the Empresas is María, with whom he falls in love. After a long flirtation, María tells him that she does not love him, and he leaves soon thereafter.
- Angélica Espino (Rocío Cárdenas) is a business associate of Gerardo Salgado who creates problems for several couples' relationships. Angélica first sets her sights on Leonel, but he rejects her in favor of his secretary, Lupita, which enrages her. Angélica then begins flirting with Bruno; their relationship culminates with a kiss that Fabiola witnesses, leading to a very public fight between the two women. Alba also convinces Angélica to seduce a tormented Héctor at his and Vivian's wedding reception.
- Maggy (Stéphanie Gérard) is Estrella's best friend and confidant. She develops a crush on Estrella's younger brother, Ángel, and drives him to a secluded location in hopes of seducing him; however, when he spurns her advances, she drives away, leaving him abandoned in the middle of nowhere and effectively ending any chance of a relationship between the two, despite her subsequent regrets. Estrella eventually forgives Maggy for her actions, and Maggy sets her sights on Estrella's ex-boyfriend, Greco, who remains in love with Estrella.
- Dr. Alejandro Ruiz (Alejandro Ruiz) is Demetrio and Daniela's marital counselor who subsequently becomes Ana Rosa's psychiatrist when she is hospitalized for a second time. Dr. Ruiz recognizes that Ana Rosa has been manipulated by her aunt and uncle for her whole life and helps her to become a better person, encouraging her to tell Esteban the truth about her miscarriage and to openly accuse Demetrio of sexually abusing her. Dr. Ruiz begins to fall in love with Ana Rosa, but before they can truly have a relationship she is murdered in Aruba. Dr. Ruiz is subsequently seen comforting Daniela after Demetrio's arrest. In the alternate ending, Ana Rosa is not murdered; therefore the couple remains in a committed relationship.
- El Cadenas (Manuel Medina; English: Chains) is a street thug and the father of El Panzas. El Cadenas takes El Panzas back from El Pulpo and forces his son to work on the street as a clown, only granting the boy freedom when Pulpo pays him a significant amount of money. After learning from a newspaper that El Pulpo is a multimillionaire, El Cadenas kidnaps all four of El Pulpo's foster sons for ransom, only to be arrested. After escaping from prison, Cadenas attempts to murder El Pulpo but instead stabs and kills Carlos instead. He is again arrested. In the alternate ending, El Cadenas does not escape from prison.
- Flavio Marinelli (Sergio Catalán) is a con artist masquerading foreign businessman with whom Héctor attempts to start a franchise. After Carlos gives him all of Héctor's financial files, Marinelli is able to defraud Héctor and leave him with a significant amount of debt.
- Vicky (Vicky Palacios) is a golddigging dancer who sets her sights on the unsuspecting Pulpo. Believing himself in love with her, El Pulpo proposes to Vicky in the hopes that, as a married couple, they will be able to adopt the niños. After finding out that Vicky is El Cadenas's girlfriend, El Pulpo leaves Vicky, and she is arrested alongside El Cadenas after the latter murders Carlos. In the alternate ending, El Cadenas does not escape from prison, and Vicky is not seen after his arrest.
- El Panzas (Andrés Márquez; Bellies), El Greñas (Raúl Sebastián; Tangled Hair), El Huesos (Joustein Roustand; Bones), and El Pulgarcito (Santiago Hernández; Little Thumb), collectively referred to as Los Niños (The Boys), are four homeless boys whom Pulpo encounters in the streets. El Pulpo takes the boys into his home and, with the help of his late stepbrother's maid, Venturina, raises them as his own sons. The four boys are kidnapped by El Panzas's father, El Cadenas, and are taken by social services after they are recovered. El Greñas, who left home after his mother began dating an abusive man, is recovered by his newly single mother, but the other three boys are formally adopted by El Pulpo.
- Flor (Evelyn Nieto) is a homeless girl whom Greco catches stealing an apple from him. Greco kindly offers the girl work at his family's flower store, but when Greco rejects her amorous advances on her first day of work she goes back to the store that night and destroys many of the plants. Greco forgives Flor, however, and allows her to continue working for him.
