= Víctor Cordero Aurrecoechea =

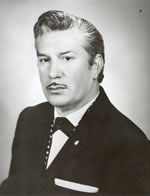
- Born: 10 October 1914; Mexico City, Mexico
- Died: 7 December 1983 (aged 69); Mexico City, Mexico
- Children: José Luis Cordero
- Parent(s): Rafael Cordero; Rosario Aurrecoechea Jiménez

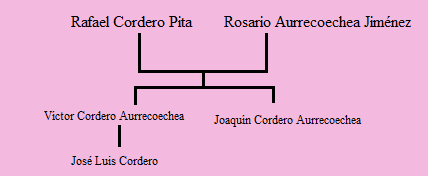
Víctor Cordero's family tree

Víctor Cordero Aurrecoechea (10 October 1914 – 7 December 1983) was a Mexican composer, who was born and died in Mexico City. Many of his compositions were used in Mexican films, and Mexican singers including Pedro Infante and Jorge Negrete performed Cordero's songs.

== Compositions ==
Corderoʻs compositions were used in more than 70 Mexican films. A few of his notable compositions include:

- Juan Charrasqueado
- El loco
- Gabino Barrera
- El ojo de vidrio
- Besos callejeros (in the film The Place Without Limits)
- Flor triste
- Domingo Corrales

== Family ==
Víctor Cordero was a son of Don Rafael Cordero and his wife, Rosario Aurrecoechea Jiménez, and thus a brother of the actor Joaquín Cordero Aurrecoechea. Son of Víctor is José Luis Cordero, who is a singer and actor.
