= Marea de pasiones =

- Genre: Telenovela
- Based on: Paixão by Filipa Poppe & Joana Andrade
- Developed by: Claudia Velazco
- Written by: Jaime Esteban Orellana Morales; José Ramón Menéndez; Paulina Barros; Francisco Olivé
- Directed by: Rodrigo Cachero; Carlos Cock; Javier Pastrón Fox
- Starring: Oka Giner; Matías Novoa; Alejandro de la Madrid; Margarita Muñoz; Blanca Guerra; Luz María Jerez; Anna Ciocchetti; Alejandro Camacho
- Theme music composer: Jordi Bachbush
- Opening theme: "Marea de pasiones"
- Country of origin: Mexico
- Original language: Spanish
- No. of seasons: 1
- No. of episodes: 65

Production
- Executive producer: Giselle González
- Producer: Julieta de la O
- Editors: Irving Rosas; Gabriela Torres; Alma Hernández
- Camera setup: Multi-camera
- Production company: TelevisaUnivision

Original release
- Network: Las Estrellas
- Release: 4 March – 31 May 2024

Marea de pasiones (English title: Passionate Tides) is a Mexican telenovela produced by Giselle González for TelevisaUnivision. It is based on the 2017 Portuguese telenovela Paixão, created by Filipa Poppe and Joana Andrade. The series stars Oka Giner and Matías Novoa. It aired on Las Estrellas from 4 March 2024 to 31 May 2024.

== Plot ==
Luisa and Marcelo see their marriage plans tarnished after the murder of Alejandro, Luisa's father, as Marcelo seems to be the main suspect in the murder. In reality, behind Alejandro's murder is Zaid, an ambitious man obsessed with Luisa. To strengthen the suspicion on Marcelo, Zaid has a guerrilla group kidnap him, so that everyone believes he fled. His disappearance shatters Luisa's heart, as she thinks he is guilty of her father's murder. Luisa finds out she is pregnant and confesses it to Zaid, who asks her to marry him and let him assume paternity. Luisa accepts in order to prevent her child from being rejected. After seven years, Marcelo returns, after escaping from his captors. Upon his return, everything is different and he and Luisa must fight against all odds to make their love a reality.

== Cast ==
=== Main ===
- Oka Giner as Luisa Grajales
- Matías Novoa as Marcelo Bernal
- Alejandro de la Madrid as Zaid Espino
- Margarita Muñoz as Helena Ugarte
- Blanca Guerra as María Inés Bernal
- Luz María Jerez as Leonor Raygoza Grajales
- Anna Ciocchetti as Isela Grajales de Marrero
- Alejandro Camacho as Juan Marrero
- Michel Duval as Santiago "Tiago" Grajales
- Alexa Martín as Beatriz Marrero Grajales
- Francisco Pizaña as Felipe Bernal
- Grecia Krinis as Natalia Espino
- Ariana Saavedra as Ana Grajales
- Ana Tena as Camila Marrero Grajales
- Jesús Castro Ponce as Enzo Hernández
- Alfredo Gatica as Alfonso Marrero Grajales
- Leticia Perdigón as Amanda
- Álex Perea as Osvaldo
- Alejandra Zaid as Roberta
- Epy Vélez as Nora
- Erick Diaz as Walter
- Emiliano González as Iñaki
- Alex Cortés as Gael
- Jessica Decote as Rita

=== Guest stars ===
- Saúl Lisazo as Alejandro Grajales
- Alejandra Andreu
- Alejandro Ibarra

== Production ==
=== Development ===
In November 2023, it was announced that Giselle González had begun pre-production on Marea de pasiones. Filming began a month later and concluded on 8 May 2024.

=== Casting ===
On 9 November 2023, Blanca Guerra was announced as part of the cast. On 7 December 2023, Oka Giner and Matías Novoa were confirmed in the lead roles, with Alejandro de la Madrid and Margarita Muñoz as antagonists of the story. On 21 December 2023, Alejandro Camacho joined the cast.

== Ratings ==
Viewership and ratings per season of Marea de pasiones
Season	Timeslot (CT)	Episodes	First aired		Last aired		Avg. viewers (millions)
Season	Timeslot (CT)	Episodes	Date	Viewers (millions)	Date	Viewers (millions)	Avg. viewers (millions)
1	Mon–Fri 9:30 p.m.	64	4 March 2024	2.60	31 May 2024	2.87	2.42

== Episodes ==
No.	Title	Original release date	Mexico viewers (millions)
1	"Nadie me va a separar de Luisa"	4 March 2024 (Note: Premiered early online through Las Estrellas website on 1 March 2024.)	2.60
Alejandro denies that Luisa has a relationship with Marcelo, whom he considers not only inferior but also his business rival. Alejandro warns María Inés that if she does not fulfill her contract, she could lose half of her land, unless she agrees to help him separate Marcelo and Luisa. Marcelo takes advantage of the trip to Colombia to propose to Luisa; Zaid is jealous when he sees them celebrating their engagement. Alejandro discovers Zaid's betrayal and when he confronts him, he is killed; Zaid blames Marcelo for his murder.
2	"Voy a volver, Luisa"	5 March 2024	2.32
Zaid takes the opportunity to accuse Marcelo of Alejandro's murder and the family supports his accusation. María Inés is determined to get justice for her son. María Inés is informed that Marcelo may be tried and she makes it clear that she will do whatever it takes to find him. Luisa wants nothing to do with Marcelo. Zaid questions Luisa and she shows him her pregnancy test, he takes the opportunity to declare his love for her and proposes to start a life together, Luisa accepts his proposal. After 7 years of not hearing from him, Marcelo returns to see Luisa with Zaid.
3	"Tienes que pagar en vida"	6 March 2024	2.28
Zaid realizes that in reality Luisa has never stopped loving Marcelo and fears that his arrival will ruin everything he has built. Luisa tries to get Marcelo to confess to Alejandro's murder to finally make him pay for his crime. Marcelo goes into the flames to save the workers who are stuck in the smoke. Luisa seeks out the Colombian authorities to make the judicial process against Marcelo take place in Mexico.
4	"Yo soy Natalia"	7 March 2024	2.45
Luisa returns to Marcelo the engagement ring he had given her seven years ago and he takes it as a proof of her love. Marcelo meets Natalia despite Luisa's attempts to keep her a secret. Camila manages to read a message from Iñaki in which he reveals his suspicion that Ana is attracted to other girls. Marcelo tries to destroy one of the Grajales' hotels and Zaid sends him a warning to make him learn his lesson.
5	"Natalia es tu hija"	8 March 2024	2.47
A moment with Natalia triggers Zaid's memories of how Marcelo lost his sister Catita. Helena convinces Marcelo to go out in an attempt to seduce him. Zaid complains to Helena for not putting an end to Marcelo when she had the chance but she has other plans for him. María Inés asks Marcelo to return to fight for his family, as she suspects that Natalia is his daughter.
6	"Voy a recuperar el tiempo perdido"	11 March 2024	2.47
Marcelo demands the truth from Luisa about Natalia's real father and warns that if it turns out to be him, he is willing to make up for lost time. Ana can't stop thinking about Roberta and is encouraged to ask her out, showing her genuine interest in their relationship. Ana confesses that she is afraid of her family's reaction if she were to confirm her sexual preferences. Juan accidentally reads a message between Natalia and Teresa where he discovers that Marcelo is Natalia's real father.
7	"Marcelo ignora que eres su papá"	12 March 2024	2.59
Alfonso returns after many years abroad in Europe, ready to open a business in Mexico, but Juan suspects that he only came back for money. Juan is willing to be blamed for Beatriz's crime in order to see her free of guilt. María Inés admits to Juan that they did the same thing as Luisa by hiding that he is Marcelo's real father. Luisa breaks into María Inés' house to set a trap for Marcelo but is surprised to see that he is now with Helena.
8	"Una prueba de paternidad"	13 March 2024	2.29
Juan takes advantage of Isela's sleeping pills and takes the key to her safe deposit box to access her jewelry. Marcelo manages to get close to Natalia and get a DNA sample to confirm once and for all if she is really his daughter. Zaid finds María Inés kissing Juan and tries to blackmail her, but she makes it clear that she will never give in. Zaid refuses to lose Natalia's affection and is willing to do anything to prevent Marcelo from discovering the truth.
9	"¡Natalia es mi hija!"	14 March 2024	2.64
Helena is willing to have a relationship with Marcelo while he gets his family back but he is willing to give himself completely to her. Zaid uses fake DNA tests to prove that Natalia is his daughter and shows the results to Marcelo. Helena proves her loyalty to Zaid by telling him that Juan is the one who confirmed to María Inés that Natalia is Marcelo's daughter. Beatriz invites Felipe on a date and he accepts knowing that it is all part of a plan to distract him from his investigation.
10	"Luisa declaró en mi contra"	15 March 2024	2.30
Ana gets jealous when she sees how Serena comes on to Roberta, but when she sees her insistence, she decides to put a stop to it. Marcelo confronts Luisa about the paternity test he did and she decides to put an end to the lies about Natalia. Beatriz agrees to testify on Marcelo's behalf to keep Felipe on her side during the bank investigation. Marcelo learns about the Grajales family robbery and suspects that it may have been the reason for Alejandro's death.
11	"Se acabó el juego"	18 March 2024	2.24
Iñaki asks Camila out and she suspects he has another reason for doing so, as she knows they are too different. Although Alfonso refuses to provide Alicia with substances because of her condition, she decides to go ahead and consume them and dies by his side. Luisa is forced to confess to her family that Marcelo is Natalia's biological father, forcing her to face the scorn of almost everyone around her. Zaid imposes a restraining order to keep Marcelo away from Natalia; Luisa tries to console Marcelo and ends up confessing that she has never stopped loving him.
12	"La sangre de un Bernal"	19 March 2024	2.46
Serena demands that Roberta allow her to live with her while she pays off her debt and tries to seduce her; Ana interrupts them. Gael confesses how he is so sure that Camila infected him when they were intimate. Marcelo decides to move on with his life and proposes to Helena that they have a serious and committed relationship. Marcelo threatens Tiago with making public the accusation against him unless he confesses who testified against him for Alejandro's death.
13	"Alejandro era como mi padre"	20 March 2024	2.33
Roberta finds herself in need of making more money and Zaid warns her that the only way to do so is to sell his merchandise to the casino guests. Leonor spies on Ana as she talks to Roberta and butts in when she overhears her admitting her love. Zaid offers Luisa to reconsider having more children to distract Leonor's anger; Juan suspects Zaid has other motives. Marcelo confronts Zaid to admit his role in Alejando's death and to his surprise, he confesses his crime.
14	"Marcelo me quiere quitar a la niña"	21 March 2024	N/A
Iñaki fears Gael's attacks and asks Camila to solve her problems once and for all. Zaid refuses to have a child with Helena and offers her money to take care of the matter. Nora is cornered between her dignity and her son's illness and decides to give in to reach an agreement to drop the lawsuit against Tiago. Luisa worries about receiving Marcelo's lawsuit for custody of her daughter.
15	"Prisión preventiva"	22 March 2024	2.60
Zaid threatens Ana to reveal her secret to the whole family unless she agrees to take her friends to the casino. Luisa demands that Leonor stop despising Natalia or she will be forced to stay away from the family and business. Luisa asks the judge to order Marcelo to be remanded in custody and Felipe is forced to carry out the arrest. Zaid prepares everything to make Natalia discover the accusations against Marcelo so she will never want to see him again.
16	"¡Zaid es un manipulador!"	25 March 2024	2.31
Iñaki asks Camila to put an end to her blackmail against Gael, as he is afraid of paying the consequences behind bars. Roberta asks Ana to end their relationship, as she fears that Zaid will blackmail her again in exchange for continuing to keep her secret. Roberta discovers the reason why Zaid asked Ana to invite her friends to the casino in exchange for keeping her secret. Helena argues with Luisa for sending Marcelo to jail, but assures her that he will be very busy once the child she is expecting is born.
17	"Te amo, Luisa"	26 March 2024	2.25
Osvaldo visits Tiago to find out how true Nora's accusations are. Marcelo wakes up for a moment and when he sees Helena, he thinks it is Luisa and confesses his love to her. Camila shares with Iñaki her plan to pretend to be boyfriend and girlfriend to justify the time they have been missing together. Luisa visits Marcelo in the hospital fearing for his well-being and upon hearing that he still loves her, she cannot resist kissing him one more time.
18	"Tú eres Natalia Bernal"	27 March 2024	2.38
Zaid forces Helena to toast with him and she suspects that the child she is expecting has something to do with his order. Felipe learns that Marcelo has been hospitalized and suspects that Robledo and the Grajales family are behind this. Roberta is forced to reject Ana for fear that she will discover her real job. María Inés can no longer keep quiet and demands from Zaid that Natalia finds out once and for all that Marcelo is her biological father.
19	"¿Alguien ha visto a Natalia?"	28 March 2024	2.19
Distressed to find Roberta's apartment trashed, Ana comforts her and learns that she owes a large amount of money. Recovering in the hospital from the attack he received in jail, Marcelo talks to Helena, who tells him that he mistook her for Luisa; he apologizes. Luisa discovers that Natalia is not at home and immediately the family starts looking for her. In the middle of a confrontation between Zaid and Marcelo over Natalia's whereabouts, Luisa tries to intervene but when she grabs Zaid's gun, the trigger goes off, endangering her life.
20	"Tenemos que buscar a Natalia"	29 March 2024	2.05
After the incident at the hospital in which Zaid's gun is fired, Luisa is wounded but does not suffer serious consequences, though Zaid is arrested. Luisa and Marcelo join forces to find Natalia and find a garment that belongs to Natalia. Marcelo quickly dives into the sea without imagining that Natalia is with a stranger. Ana confronts Zaid about his schemes. However, he uses her love for Roberta to continue blackmailing her and keep her in his business. Knowing that she is being targeted by the police, Beatriz confesses to her father that she plans to take a decisive step to keep them out of jail and also admits to him that has feelings for Felipe.
21	"¿Dónde tienes a Natalia?"	1 April 2024	2.18
Tiago manages to find Natalia and realizing that she fled of her own free will, decides to help her hide from her parents. Ana is determined to unmask Zaid no matter what it takes and Roberta fears that her love is not enough to save her. Zaid tries to distract Luisa from her worries but when he is rejected, he complains that Marcelo is interfering in their relationship. Marcelo confronts Tiago for hiding Natalia and upon hearing this, Zaid comes to his aid to find his daughter.
22	"Sácalo de tu vida"	2 April 2024	2.53
Tiago confesses where Natalia is and when they get to the room they find her playing next to a dangerous short circuit. Luisa fears what Tiago might do in the future and warns him that she will find a way to put a stop to him. Felipe and Beatriz confess to each other that their feelings have grown beyond any deception and decide to give each other a real chance at love. Roberta warns Luisa about Zaid's shady business dealings at the hotel in an attempt to stop him from blackmailing Ana.
23	"Aléjate de Marcelo"	3 April 2024	2.51
Marcelo opens his heart to Helena and admits that he has not yet managed to get Luisa out of his heart, leaving him little hope of loving her. Roberta warns Ana's friends about Zaid's plan and they decide to stay out of danger. The police discover the problems between Gael and Camila and suspect that she may be behind his disappearance. María Inés asks Luisa to stay away from Marcelo so that he can get back to his life despite the many problems that burden him.
24	"Estas jugando bien tus cartas"	4 April 2024	2.34
Iñaki learns that Camila was arrested and fears that his role in Gael's disappearance will be discovered. After a night of intimacy, Ana reflects on the warning given to Luisa and fears that she has dismissed it without investigating. Luisa receives another warning about Zaid but this time decides to question him directly to find out what is really going on. Helena decides to stop following Zaid's orders and uses the baby she is expecting to blackmail him.
25	"No tengo nada"	5 April 2024	2.40
Felipe's plan to free Beatriz from all suspicion works perfectly and they celebrate by sleeping together. Tiago discovers the relationship between Leonor and Walter and tries to take advantage of it to regain his position at the hotel. After the news that Helena lost her son, Marcelo surrenders to the despair of not being able to have a new beginning. Serena is willing to settle Roberta's debt in exchange for Ana forgetting about her forever.
26	"¿Quieres que sea tu esposa?"	8 April 2024	2.15
Zaid proposes to Luisa to have the baby they have been planning. Facing doubts about her relationship with Marcelo, Helena wants to know if she will become his wife but does not receive the answer she expected. Iñaki wants to retrieve the money that was delivered for Gael's ransom from the trash can where it was placed. However, Camila saves him from getting caught by the police. Natalia asks Marcelo to have another family so he won't be alone. Luisa cries because of her distance with Marcelo.
27	"Casémonos"	9 April 2024	2.27
Marcelo realizes that he cannot put an end to Helena's illusions and decides to propose to her. Ana feels jealous when she sees Roberta worried about Serena but understands her decision to go to support her. Realizing the danger she is in, Serena decides to say goodbye to Roberta forever and forget everything that unites them. Marcelo confronts Zaid for his attempt to get him out of the hotel project and for having mocked Helena's misfortune; Luisa is disappointed to learn about his dark side.
28	"Juan es tu verdadero padre"	10 April 2024	2.41
Felipe receives a clue that could bring him closer to finding Sofía, Beatriz's missing sister. Marcelo warns the entire Grajales family that if they take him out of the project, they will lose Cristobal's offer. Camila and Iñaki are seen by someone while collecting the money to finish Gael's business. María Inés gets fed up with keeping secrets involving her family and confesses to Marcelo that his real father is Juan Marrero.
29	"Está dispuesto a soltar la sopa"	11 April 2024	2.45
Marcelo confronts María Inés for having kept such an important secret from him for so long. Zaid asks Juan to make a series of illicit moves to tarnish Marcelo's name but he refuses to help him with his revenge. Luisa forces Tiago to take psychological therapy and pay lifelong compensation to the female employees he has hurt. Bardo asks Marcelo to travel to Colombia immediately, as he has learned that in jail there is a man willing to help him prove his innocence.
30	"Zaid no tiene por qué enterarse"	12 April 2024	2.25
Luisa decides to support Marcelo in everything necessary to help him find the truth about her father's death. Luisa and Marcelo meet with the judge to drop the charges against him to allow him to travel to Colombia. The agent handling Gael's case interrogates Camila and Iñaki to expose them. Luisa cancels her business trip at the last minute to accompany Marcelo to Colombia.
31	"El reflejo de algo muy bonito"	15 April 2024	2.60
Zaid finds out that Marcelo is Juan's son, explaining the reason why he has always sought to protect him. Luisa takes advantage of Helena's call to let her know that she accompanied Marcelo to Colombia even though he is engaged. Gael's disappearance causes Ana to become suspicious of Roberta and she decides that she cannot be with someone who does not trust her. Natalia's childhood photos make Marcelo and Luisa remember the love they had for each other in the past.
32	"Ya no dudo de ti"	16 April 2024	2.56
Alfonso manages to communicate with Isela and she discovers that he had nothing to do with the theft of her bracelet, pointing out Juan as the only culprit. Luisa resents Socorro's sudden support but ends up regretting it when she discovers who she really is. Luisa realizes that Zaid lied in his statement upon hearing Vicario's confession regarding the manipulation of Alejandro's forensic report. Luisa apologizes to Marcelo for blaming him for the death of her father and she recognizes that as a result of the confession, things between the two have changed.
33	"Voy a luchar por nosotros"	17 April 2024	2.89
Gael lets Camila know that he is safe and threatens to denounce everyone unless they give him double the money they had offered him. Marcelo finds Luisa's letter in which she swears her eternal love no matter what adversities they may face. Luisa demands answers from Zaid for having lied in his testimony about Alejandro's death. Helena realizes Marcelo's true feelings for her and assures him that she will make him pay for his lies.
34	"Las cosas acaban por saberse"	18 April 2024	2.68
Alfonso surprises everyone by showing up at his house to ask for Isela's financial support once again. Luisa demands answers from Juan for having lied to the whole family about the way Alejandro died. Bertha threatens Tiago with publishing the recording of what he tried to do to her unless he accepts her call girls as casino employees. Marcelo suggests to Luisa that the only way to confirm his innocence is to exhume her father's body.
35	"Una nueva familia"	19 April 2024	2.25
Zaid uses his charms and kisses Leonor to keep her on his side and prevent the exhumation of Alejandro's body. María Inés discovers that Cristóbal suffers from Alzheimer's and when confronted, they confess their true feelings for each other. Helena slaps Luisa for having traveled with Marcelo to seduce him and makes it clear that she will not rest until she marries him. Tiago forces Luisa to talk about Helena's attack in front of Natalia, leaving her with more doubts about the future of her family.
36	"Zaid mató a Alejandro"	22 April 2024	2.30
Walter reveals to Leonor that her husband's murderer is Zaid, he dies in front of her. Juan pays Rita to pretend to be Sofía, the daughter Isela lost many years ago, she accepts in exchange for saving her group home. Bea confesses to Felipe that she cannot change her statement because she fears for her family's life. Juan begs Leonor to denounce Zaid since he threatened Beatriz, she refuses since she is afraid of him.
37	"Juega el juego de Zaid"	23 April 2024	2.14
Isela introduces Alfonso to Sofía as his sister; he is shocked to discover that it is Rita. Helena assures Marcelo that she is willing to not confess anything to Luisa in exchange for him marrying her. Luisa lets Marcelo know that she has withdrawn the authorization to exhume her father's body. Isela visits Beatriz in jail to ask her forgiveness for being so selfish with her and begs her to reveal the name of the person who has threatened her. Isela opposes the exhumation of her brother's body and forbids them to enter her land, but Leonor threatens to reveal her secret.
38	"Vamos a robar su cuerpo"	24 April 2024	2.29
Zaid warns Juan that they will go to Alejandro's grave to steal his body since he will not allow it to be exhumed. Natalia confesses to Luisa that Zaid raised his voice at her the days she was left in his care. Juan takes the sample required for the DNA test to pass Rita off as Isela's daughter. Judge Velez contacts Marcelo to inform him that the autopsy results show that Alejandro died of asphyxiation and he is now a free man.
39	"¿Te das cuenta que nunca te mentí?"	25 April 2024	2.14
Judge Velez contacts Luisa to inform her that her father died from asphyxiation and not from a fall, she confirms that Marcelo is innocent. Ana confirms that Zaid is the man who has threatened her since he is the only one who knows about her sexual preferences. Luisa apologizes to Marcelo for having mistrusted him. Ana can no longer hide her feelings and confesses to her mother that she is a lesbian. When he discovers that Leonor has in her possession audios that compromise his freedom, Zaid threatens her and puts her life in danger.
40	"Zaid, ¿por qué haces esto?"	26 April 2024	2.02
Felipe visits Beatriz in prison and proposes marriage. Concerned about Helena's behavior, Marcelo asks for María Inés' help to take care of her. However, he is filled with rage when he learns that she was responsible for poisoning his mother. Ana bursts into tears because of Leonor's disappearance, Luisa approaches her to comfort her and together they give each other strength. After kidnapping Leonor, Zaid decides to kill her and in order to leave no trace of his crime, he chooses the land near Marcelo's family property.
41	"Ojalá que te des cuenta a tiempo, Luisa"	29 April 2024	2.47
The police find a recording with Leonor's voice in which she admits her guilt for Alejandro's death, clearing Marcelo of all suspicion. Marcelo confronts Helena for having poisoned María Inés and demands that she leave his house immediately. Luisa finds Ana and Roberta in a romantic moment and decides to leave without knowing what to say to her about it. During her recording, Leonor leaves some last words of encouragement for each of her children but manages to leave a hidden message for Luisa.
42	"Natalia le tiene miedo a Zaid"	30 April 2024	2.32
Alfonso confesses to Ruth that she is the only reason he stays clean. Ruth is forced to admit that she is Sofía, his lost sister. Isela confesses the secret with which she was blackmailing Leonor and Camila, not having her curiosity satisfied, demands that she admit the truth. Teresa forces Tiago to admit the reason why he cannot have a relationship with a woman other than his victim. Marcelo warns Luisa about Natalia's fear of Zaid and asks her to consider sharing custody of their daughter.
43	"Pareces mi enemigo"	1 May 2024	2.42
Ruth begs Juan to put an end once and for all to his lie, as she cannot continue to be close to Alfonso without being able to tell him the love she feels for him. Zaid complains to Luisa for giving Marcelo joint custody of Natalia but she argues that there is no longer any accusation against him, making a big difference in their relationship. Luisa confesses to Teresa that her relationship with Zaid has reached a point where she could believe the worst about him. Zaid knows that Luisa is all he has left and looks for a way to show his remorse so as not to lose her to Marcelo.
44	"Lo nuestro no tiene futuro"	2 May 2024	2.38
Zaid makes Natalia believe that if she decides to see Marcelo more often, the time will come when she will have to choose which father to keep. Nora finds Teresa's diagnosis of Tiago and decides to use it to blackmail him. Camila visits Beatriz in the police station and for the first time they enjoy an honest conversation between sisters. Zaid confirms that Luisa was unfaithful with Marcelo and explodes with rage, capable of doing anything because of the betrayal.
45	"Las nauseas que sientes por tí misma"	3 May 2024	2.49
Cristóbal admits that he decided to invite Helena into his house because he feels a strange closeness to her despite everything she has done. Zaid throws the evidence of Luisa's infidelity in her face and despises her for having failed the family he decided to create. While Beatriz is transferred to prison, she receives her family's best wishes. Alfonso listens to Isela's advice and tests Ruth's identity by giving her cherries, to which Sofía is allergic.
46	"No te convengo como enemigo"	6 May 2024	2.51
Helena confides in Cristóbal a memory from when she was little that could explain the abandonment issues she constantly experiences. Iñaki shows his support for Camila by accompanying her to get vaccinated against HPV so that she can fully enjoy their relationship. Luisa confronts Zaid and demands that he get out of her life once and for all, as she is not willing to ever forgive him. Luisa discovers that Zaid has been paying Helena to separate her from Marcelo and lately they have been using Natalia without caring about the damage they are causing her.
47	"Deberías estar preocupada por tu hija"	7 May 2024	2.41
Camila finds Gael unconscious and decides to rescue him; but on the way she finds a clue about Leonor's death. Luisa demands that Helena confess her complicity with Zaid and asks her to resign from working with him regardless of the consequences. Zaid warns Natalia that her mother plans to break up the family they have created in order to move in with Marcelo. Luisa assures Zaid that she is willing to divorce him no matter the cost, but he warns her that she would be putting her daughter at risk if she goes ahead with her plans.
48	"Tu jueguito se te va a acabar"	8 May 2024	2.42
Thanks to Zaid's constant manipulations, Natalia refuses to accept her parents' divorce and blames Luisa for provoking it. Camila and Iñaki admit their mistakes to Gael and apologize to him, ready to face the consequences. Helena seeks out an old friend looking for work but in return learns that Zaid has a new scam planned that could impede Marcelo's plans. Ana recognizes her father's mistress at the casino and asks Felipe for help, who quickly discovers her true identity and numerous crimes.
49	"¿Qué te sabía mi mamá?"	9 May 2024	2.39
During the reading of the will, Leonor makes it clear how she feels about Zaid by leaving him nothing but her late husband's old watch. Luisa suspects that the reason Leonor inherited a watch to Zaid has to do with all the secrets she knew about him. Natalia refuses to go on the trip with Luisa, as she is sure that it is all a plan so that she will never see Zaid again.
50	"Mi mamá ya no te quiere"	10 May 2024	2.25
Nora makes sure that everyone in the company knows about Tiago's problem with his manhood, taking away the power he had over all his employees. Isela complains to Camila for getting pregnant by the first man she fell in love with but upon discovering her history with men, she chooses to kick her out of the house. Zaid assures Natalia that his separation from Luisa is temporary and they will soon be a family again, but she forces him to realize that her mother no longer loves him.
51	"¿Quién es Cenobio Cueva?"	13 May 2024	2.58
Cristóbal worries about Helena when he realizes her stormy relationship with her stepfather and asks Marcelo for help in investigating her past. Marcelo finds Ordóñez willing to pay a fortune in exchange for information about Alejandro's death; Ordóñez takes the opportunity to blackmail Zaid. Juan learns that Camila is hospitalized and complains to Isela for having been so negligent with their daughter.
52	"No volverán a ver a su hija"	14 May 2024	2.51
Zaid opens Ana's eyes, making her see that Roberta has been working for him all this time selling substances in the casino. Iñaki gives Camila the news that she has cancer at a very advanced stage and asks her not to let herself be defeated, as she still has a long way to go. Zaid warns Luisa of criminal charges against Marcelo if they dare to take Natalia by force. Marcelo confronts Helena for having lied to him since the day he met her and demands that she face the consequences of her actions and lies.
53	"Zaid es un delincuente"	15 May 2024	2.35
Marcelo tells Cristóbal that Helena is missing and Cristóbal compares the pain to the loss of a daughter. Isela tries to recover the happy family she once had, starting with fixing her marriage. Alfonso proves that he is willing to defend the woman he loves, even from his own father. Ana shows Luisa all of Zaid's dirty business by taking her to the casino to see it all first hand.
54	"Me voy a quedar con la cadena"	16 May 2024	2.44
Luisa warns Zaid that she will make him pay for his crimes, but he warns her that her whole family could fall if she denounces him. Ana demands Zaid's respect by throwing in his face that she is a partner in the company, a rank he could never reach. Ana manages to secretly meet with Natalia, who confesses that she does miss her mother despite what Zaid forces her to say. Marcelo discovers that the company he chose to build the hotel was nothing more than a front for a multi-million dollar scam.
55	"Tú y Santiago son tal para cual"	17 May 2024	2.49
Roberta asks for a chance to correct her mistake, but Ana rejects her, saying that there is no longer trust between the two of them. Alfonso discovers some keys in Juan's office that are the same as the ones he saw during Sofía's disappearance, making him suspect that his father had something to do with it. Iñaki refuses to accompany Camila while she sabotages her treatment and prefers to stay away to make her reconsider her decisions. Luisa assures Zaid that she will soon make him pay for the death of her parents and he defends himself by filing a complaint criticizing her role as a mother.
56	"La custodia de Natalia"	20 May 2024	2.56
As a strategy to avoid losing Natalia's custody, Luisa warns Enzo about the illicit activities taking place in the casino under Zaid's orders. Luisa warns Zaid that she will soon find a loose end that he has forgotten, the same one that will bring him down for all the crimes he has committed. Roberta prevents Ana from blaming herself for the damage to Natalia by declaring that she was part of Zaid's dirty business. Faced with the delicate situation in which Luisa and Zaid find themselves, the judge decides to send Natalia to a group home away from both of them. Seeing Camila's new willingness to fight her disease, Iñaki proposes to her but she refuses.
57	"Siempre va a ganar Natalia"	21 May 2024	2.28
Rita is forced to confess to Isela about Juan's plan for her to pretend to be their daughter Sofía, breaking Isela's heart. Luisa realizes that it will require a great sacrifice to regain Natalia's trust and decides to end her relationship with Marcelo in order to do so. Alfonso gives Felipe the USBs that could prove Zaid's frauds but he only cares about seeing Juan behind bars. Luisa infiltrates Zaid's office in search of evidence against him and discovers that Benjamín is implicated in the Paladium fraud. María Inés visits Cristóbal during one of his worst attacks due to Alzheimer's, showing her the reality of his illness.
58	"Es hijo de Zaid"	22 May 2024	2.76
Luisa confronts Juan for helping her and Zaid at the same time, assuring him that sooner or later he will have to choose whose side he is on. Camila tells Alfonso that their family fell apart the day he returned home and he decides to move away, hoping to give Rita a better life. Felipe takes advantage of the presence of Juan, Marcelo and María Inés to give notice that he is on his way to marry Beatriz regardless of the prison bars separating them. After suffering several pains, Luisa decides to go to the doctor, who informs her that she is expecting a child and laments when she realizes that Zaid is the father. María Inés goes to her appointment with the food distributor hoping that he will appreciate her passion for her work but ends up realizing how unprepared she is to be associated with a serious investor.
59	"Zaid es la opción"	23 May 2024	2.41
Juan tells Beatriz that her mother is in a psychiatric hospital and she snaps knowing it is because of his lies. Marcelo demonstrates his love for Luisa by staying by her side no matter who the father of her baby is or what she decides about her pregnancy. Tiago tries to convince Ana to support Zaid to avoid losing the company their father worked so hard to build. Faced with financial problems, Luisa is left with no choice but to sell her share of the company to Zaid to save her siblings' assets.
60	"Guerra es guerra"	24 May 2024	2.51
Marcelo traces Zaid's call to find Bejamín and recover the stolen fortune. Luisa recognizes Marcelo's courage in recovering the stolen fortune, and decides it is time to be happy with him and Natalia. Luisa confronts Tiago for having conspired against her despite knowing that Zaid was behind the company's fraud. During his coma, Alfonso recovers the memories he had repressed about Sofía's disappearance. Luisa takes her revenge against her detractors by appointing Marcelo as the new general manager so that he can decide everyone's new position in the company.
61	"La mala idea de amarte"	27 May 2024	2.53
Isela confesses to Luisa about the relationship between Zaid and Leonor in order to warn her about his dark manipulations. Juan offers María Inés the possibility of expanding her business to unimaginable places, but she no longer trusts his word. During Natalia's custody trial, Luisa suffers terrible pains making her pregnancy evident in front of Zaid. Cristóbal faces the pain of having lost a daughter when he receives the DNA test he did with Helena. Alfonso confesses to Isela everything he remembered about Sofía's disappearance hoping to finally bring peace to his mother.
62	"Por orden de Zaid Espino"	28 May 2024	2.77
Luisa receives Simón's confession in which he details how he broke into her house seven years ago and points to Zaid as the culprit in Alejandro's death. María Inés learns of Juan's crime and forces Felipe to arrest him, regardless of the fact that he is his wife's father. Faced with the evidence, Juan is forced to confess his involvement in Sofía's death along with the guilt he has carried for so many years. The detective warns Zaid that he is the main suspect in the death of Alejandro Grajales, using Simón's video as evidence against him. Simón, the delinquent who betrayed Zaid, wakes up to realize that he has Helena in front of him.
63	"Tú no amas a nadie"	29 May 2024	2.62
Helena asks Simón for help to carry out her revenge against Zaid for years of blackmail and mistreatment. María Inés forces Juan to realize the evil that lives inside him, as he has never been willing to sacrifice his comfort for anyone. Beatriz disowns Juan after learning that he orchestrated Sofía's disappearance. María Inés confesses to Isela that Sofía survived Juan's attack in hopes of bringing comfort to her grief. Juan asks for Felipe's help to get Beatriz's forgiveness, as he can no longer endure another minute of life without his daughter's affection.
64	"Hoy es el día de tu muerte"	30 May 2024	2.46
Luisa mocks Zaid's plan to regain custody of Natalia, as he has no legal way to prove his income now that he has lost his job. Helena interrupts Zaid's attack on Marcelo, as she needs the latter's support to get justice against him. Tiago's victims unite to take justice into their own hands. Helena points out to Zaid that she has the confession he made of all his crimes while eliminating Ordóñez on record. Luisa shows Tiago that, despite not realizing it, he has always had the support of the family.
65	"Nunca perdimos la esperanza"	31 May 2024	2.87
Helena accepts Zaid's tempting offer to help him escape from the hospital in exchange for a juicy reward, but in reality she plans to betray him. Zaid realizes Helena's betrayal but refuses to pay for his crimes and decides to kill himself. Helena surprises Isela by showing up at her house and she welcomes her with open arms, even knowing that their encounter will be brief. Ana and Roberta get married in the presence of their family and friends. Iñaki suffers when he learns that Camila's days are numbered and decides to help her spend her last days full of love. Marcelo and Luisa celebrate that despite all the difficulties against them, they managed to be together to form a loving family.
