= El último rey =

Mexican biographical television series

- Genre: Biographical
- Based on: El último rey by Olga Wornat
- Written by: Pablo Ferrer; Santiago Pineda
- Directed by: Alan Coton; Eric Morales
- Starring: Angélica Aragón; Pablo Montero; Iliana Fox; Jesús Moré; Iván Arana; Emilio Osorio; Salvador Sánchez
- Theme music composer: José Alfredo Jiménez
- Opening theme: "El Rey" by Pablo Montero
- Composers: J. Eduardo Murguía; Mauricio L. Arriaga; Ricardo Larrea Cortés
- Country of origin: Mexico
- Original language: Spanish
- No. of seasons: 2
- No. of episodes: 30

Production
- Executive producer: Juan Osorio
- Editors: Felipe Ortiz; Pablo Peralta; María del Socorro Manríquez; Mónica Hernández
- Camera setup: Multi-camera
- Production company: TelevisaUnivision

Original release
- Network: Las Estrellas
- Release: 14 March – 10 June 2022

El último rey is a Mexican biographical drama television series that aired on Las Estrellas from 14 March 2022 to 10 June 2022. The series is produced by Juan Osorio for TelevisaUnivision. It is based on the book of the same name that journalist Olga Wornat wrote about Vicente Fernández's life. Pablo Montero stars as Vicente Fernández.

The series has been renewed for a second season, that premiered on 16 May 2022.

== Premise ==
El último rey narrates the life of a Vicente Fernandez and how he overcome all obstacles to achieve his dream: to become one of the greatest representatives of regional Mexican music.

== Cast ==
=== Main ===
- Angélica Aragón as Dalia
- Pablo Montero as Vicente Fernández
  - Salvador Sánchez as Old Vicente Fernández
  - Eduardo Narajas as Young Vicente Fernández
  - Moisés Habib Buchard as Child Vicente Fernández
- Iliana Fox as María del Refugio Abarca Villaseñor "Doña Cuquita"
  - Jade Fraser as Young Cuquita
  - Paloma Woolrich as Old Cuquita
- Jesús Moré as Gerardo Fernández
  - Paolo Vargas as Young Gerardo Fernández
- Iván Arana as Vicente Fernández Jr.
  - Alonso Meza as Young Vicente Fernández Jr.
- Emilio Osorio as Young Alejandro Fernández / Alex Fernández
  - Vince Miranda as Adult Alejandro Fernández

=== Recurring ===
- César Évora as Francisco Manjarrez
- Sara Corrales as Patricia Rivera
- Alejandra Ambrosi as Paula Gómez
- Ligia Uriarte as Sissi
- Antonio López as Ramón
- Eva Daniela as Chicotita
- José Daniel Figueroa as Adult Felipe
- Alejandro Sandi as Federico Méndez
- Rossana de León as Lucha Villa
- Karla Garrido as La India María
- José Alfredo Jiménez
- Flor Yáñez as Alicia Juárez
- Ana Tena as Alejandra
- Carlos Balderrama
- Waldo Franco
- Carlos Kapistrán

== Production ==
=== Development ===
The series was announced by TelevisaUnivision on 13 January 2022. Filming began in late January 2022. The first teaser of the series was shown on 17 February 2022. On 16 March 2022, Juan Osorio announced that the series was renewed for a second season that will consist of 20 episodes.

=== Controversy ===
On 11 March 2022, three days before the series scheduled premiere date, it was announced that a federal judge had ordered for the series to be postponed after the family of Vicente Fernandez alleged that Televisa incurred in violations of non-contractual relationships; trademark rights; improper use of an artistic name reserved before the National Copyright Institute (Indautor); unfair competition, among other reasons. The following day, TelevisaUnivision alleged that the company had not received any judicial notice prohibiting the series from airing and would continue with airing the series. The series went on to premiere as scheduled.

== Ratings ==
Season	Timeslot (CT)	Episodes	First aired		Last aired	
Season	Timeslot (CT)	Episodes	Date	Viewers (millions)	Date	Viewers (millions)
1	Mon–Fri 8:30 p.m.	10	14 March 2022	8.0	25 March 2022	2.5
2	Mon–Fri 9:30 p.m.	20	16 May 2022	2.7	10 June 2022	2.0

== Episodes ==
=== Series overview ===
Series	Episodes	Originally released	
Series	Episodes	First released	Last released
1	10	14 March 2022	25 March 2022
2	20	16 May 2022	10 June 2022

=== Season 1 (2022) ===
No. overall	No. in season	Title	Original release date	Mexico viewers (millions)
1	1	"El secuestro del primogénito"	14 March 2022	8.0
2	2	"Prueba de vida"	15 March 2022	N/A
3	3	"Nunca olvides de donde vienes"	16 March 2022	N/A
4	4	"Solo vas a ser conocido en tu casa"	17 March 2022	N/A
5	5	"Mi fiel compañera"	18 March 2022	N/A
6	6	"Vivir bajo tu sombra"	21 March 2022	2.9
7	7	"Fuerza para resistir"	22 March 2022	2.7
8	8	"Sed de venganza"	23 March 2022	3.2
9	9	"No soy un asesino"	24 March 2022	2.7
10	10	"No hay mayor dolor que perder a un hijo"	25 March 2022	2.5

=== Season 2 (2022) ===
No. overall	No. in season	Title	Original release date	Mexico viewers (millions)
11	1	"El Sol siempre sale para todos"	16 May 2022	2.7
12	2	"Sanar heridas"	17 May 2022	2.4
13	3	"No soy feliz"	18 May 2022	2.2
14	4	"Expiación"	19 May 2022	2.3
15	5	"Fracasé como madre y mujer"	20 May 2022	2.1
16	6	"Arrancar las broncas de raíz"	23 May 2022	2.3
17	7	"Infidelidades"	24 May 2022	2.0
18	8	"Tu grave error es callar"	25 May 2022	2.2
19	9	"Con cada película, una nueva conquista"	26 May 2022	1.8
20	10	"Sacar los trapitos al Sol"	27 May 2022	1.9
21	11	"Comenzar una nueva etapa"	30 May 2022	2.3
22	12	"No puedes negar tus raíces"	31 May 2022	2.4
23	13	"Atrapado entre dos amores"	1 June 2022	2.2
24	14	"Pagar tu penitencia"	2 June 2022	2.3
25	15	"Nosotros somos tierra"	3 June 2022	1.8
26	16	"Los que se nos van, siempre nos esperan"	6 June 2022	2.3
27	17	"No somos iguales"	7 June 2022	2.3
28	18	"Atenerse a las consecuencias"	8 June 2022	2.3
29	19	"Llegó la hora de decir adiós"	9 June 2022	2.4
30	20	"Que descanse en paz"	10 June 2022	2.0
