= José Luis Cordero (actor) =

- Born: February 13, 1948 (age 77); Mexico City, Mexico
- Other names: Pocholo
- Spouse: Norma Oñate Castillo
- Children: Luis Christian Cordero Oñate
- Parent: Víctor Cordero Aurrecoechea

José Luis Cordero – also known as Pocholo – is a Mexican actor, singer and director. He was born in Mexico City on February 13, 1948, as a son of the composer Víctor Cordero Aurrecoechea (died in 1983). Luis Christian Cordero Oñate – son of José Luis – died in 2004.

== Filmography ==
=== Films ===
- Una última y nos vamos (2015) — Clandestine
- Un tigre en la cama (2009)
- La fórmula de Rasputín (2001)
- Vamos al baile (1996)
- Me tengo que casar/Papá soltero (1995) — Pocholo
- Mecánica mexicana (1995)
- Los cargadores (1995)
- A ritmo de salsa (1994)
- La cantina (1994)
- Le pegaron al gordo (1994)
- Suerte en la vida (1994)
- Encuentro sangriento (1994)
- Soy hombre y qué (1993)
- Yo no la maté (1993)
- Mi novia ya no es Virginia (1993)
- Cambiando el destino (1992)
- ¿Cómo fui a enamorarme de ti? (1991)
- El bizcocho del Panadero (1991)
- Secreto sangriento (1991) — Sergio
- Domingo trágico (1991)
- La noche del fugitivo (1991)
- La última fuga (1991)
- No tan virgen (1991)
- La verdadera historia de Barman y Droguin (1991)
- Retén (1991)
- Entre la fe y la muerte (1990)
- El camaleón (1990)
- El día de las locas (1990)
- Ruleta mortal (1990) — Luis
- Fugas del capitán fantasma (1989)
- La mafia tiembla II (1989)

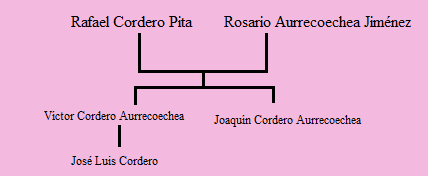
The family tree of Cordero

- No le saques, pos no le metas (1989)
- Al filo de la muerte (1989)
- Te gustan, te las traspaso (1989)
- Chiquita... No te la acabas (1989)
- El Francotirador fenómeno (1989)
- Destrampados in Los Angeles (1987)
- Cursilerías (1986)
- Quiéreme con música (1957)

=== Telenovelas ===
- Dos hogares — Mario
- Al diablo con los guapos — Horacio
- La fea más bella — Paco Muñoz
- Contra viento y marea — Pocholo
- Velo de novia — Gumaro
- ¡Vivan los niños! — Patotas
- Por tu amor

Soñadoras Ismael

== See also ==
- Joaquín Cordero — an uncle of José Luis
