= Joaquín Cordero =

Mexican actor (1922–2013), known for his roles in the telenovelas

- Cordero
- Born: Joaquín Cordero Aurrecoechea; August 16, 1922; Puebla, Mexico
- Died: February 19, 2013 (aged 90); Mexico City, Mexico
- Years active: 1943–2013
- Spouse: Alma Guzmán (m. 1953; died 2012)
- Children: 3

Joaquín Cordero (Spanish pronunciation: [xoaˈkiŋ koɾˈðeɾo]; August 16, 1922 – February 19, 2013) was a Mexican actor of the cinema, theatre and telenovelas.

Cordero shown appeared in theatre and on television and in the latter medium in numerous telenovelas and winning numerous awards.

According to his family, the actor died of heartbreak, facing depression over the death of his beloved wife, Alma Guzmán, which occurred on July 18, 2012.

== Family ==
Joaquín was son of Don Rafael Cordero Pita and Rosario Aurrecoechea and brother of Víctor Cordero Aurrecoechea.

Joaquín's wife was Alma Guzmán, half-sister of journalist Maxine Woodside. Alma bore a son named David.

== Filmography ==
- El Corsario Negro (1944) as Pirata (uncredited)
- Una Gitana en México (1945)
- Don't Marry My Wife (1947)
- Mujer (1947) as Ricardo González (uncredited)
- Fly Away, Young Man! (1947) as Soldado mensajero (uncredited)
- A Vênus de Fogo (1948)
- Se la llevó el Remington (1948) as Rodrigo
- En los altos de Jalisco (1948) as Hermano de Valentina (uncredited)
- La santa del barrio (1948)
- La rebelian de los fantasmas (1949) as Romeo
- El gran campeón (1949) as Jorge
- Yo maté a Juan Charrasqueado (1949)
- Don't Love Me So Much (1949) as Reynaldo (Chamaco)
- Quinto patio (1950) as El rorro
- Orange Blossom for Your Wedding (1950) as Eduardo - adulto
- Yo tambien soy de Jalisco (1950)
- The Two Orphans (1950) as Morete
- Arrabalera (1951) as Luis
- Monte de piedad (1951) as El nene
- Peregrina (1951) as Marcos Obregón
- Tercio de quites (1951) as Luis Ponce
- Todos son mis hijos (1951) as Juan Salgado
- Con todo el corazón (1952) as Felipe
- Mamá nos quita los novios (1952) as Casimiro
- Una Mujer sin amor (1952) as Carlos
- The Three Happy Friends (1952) as Alberto
- Prefiero a tu papá..! (1952) as Héctor del Puente
- Una calle entre tú y yo (1952) as Padre Carlos
- Acuérdate de vivir (1953) as Jorge
- Yo soy gallo dondequiera!.. (1953) as Jimmy; Joaquín
- Pepe el Toro (1953) as Lalo Gallardo
- El gran mentiroso (1953) as Fernanado Palmerin
- Venganza en el Circo (1954) as Fernando
- El gran autor (1954) as Fernando Medina
- Romance de Fieras (1954) as Javier Ponce
- Sandunga para tres (1954) as Antonio Ugalde
- Prisionera del pasado (1954)
- Los aventureros (1954) as Margarito
- El Río y la muerte (1954) as Gerardo Anguiano
- ¡Vaya tipos! (1955)
- La gaviota (1955) as Antonio
- Tres bribones (1955) as Margarito Santos
- ¡Que bravas son las costeñas!... (1955) as Pedro
- Valentes e Indomáveis (1955) as Miguelón Villalobos
- Fuerza de los humildes (1955)
- La Venganza de los Villalobos (1955) as Miguelón Villalobos

Mask showing Joaquín Cordero

- Fugitivos: Pueblo de Proscritos (1955) as Carlos / Licenciado
- Tres Valientes Camaradas (1956)
- La Faraona (1956) as Alberto Prim
- Tierra de hombres (1956) as Fernando
- Cinco vidas y un destino (1957) as Marrcos Navarro
- La dulce enemiga (1957) as Nicolás
- Al compás del rock and roll (1957)
- La mujer marcada (1957) as Germán Álvarez
- The Boxer (1958) as Natalio Sanchez / Kid Relampago
- Música de siempre (1958)
- It Happened in Mexico (1958) as Aurelio
- El derecho a la vida (1959) as Enrique
- Las aventuras de Carlos Lacroix (1959)
- Kermesse (1959) as Alberto Torres
- Flor de canela (1959)
- Manicomio (1959) as Dr. Ricardo Andrade
- La reina del cielo (1959) as Bartolome
- Un chico valiente (1960)
- El Tesoro de Chucho el Roto (1960) as Antonio Rioja
- ¡Qué bonito amor! (1960) as Miguel Rivadeneira
- Orlak, el infierno de Frankenstein (1960) as Jaime Rojas / Orlak
- Mi amor frente al pasado (1960, TV Series)
- El Gato (1961) as El Gato
- En carne propia (1961) as Gabriel Lozano
- Suerte te dé Dios (1961) as Lupe
- Ay Chabela...! (1961)
- ¡Que padre tan padre! (1961) as Julián Barroso
- Santo contra cerebro del mal (1961) as Dr. Campos
- Tres tristes tigres (1961) as Lorenzo
- Bonitas las tapatías (1961)
- Santo contra hombres infernales (1961)
- Juventud sin Dios (1962) as Lambert J. Dehner
- Asesinos de la lucha libre (1962) as Joaquin
- Los cinco halcones (1962) as Trini
- Las recién casadas (1962) as Fernando
- La moneda rota (1962)
- Monte Escondido o Leonardo Moncada (1962) as Leonardo Moncada
- El rey de la pistola (1962) as Juan Rosales
- El asesino enmascarado (1962)
- Atrás de las nubes (1962) as Bandido
- Los forajidos (1962)
- La herencia (1962, TV Series)
- El terrible gigante de las nieves (1963) as Jorge Méndez
- La risa de la ciudad (1963) as Beto
- En la vieja California (1963) as Antonio / Don Pedro
- México de mis recuerdos (1963) as Pablo Flores
- Herencia maldita (1963) as Leonardo Moncada
- Los bravos de California (1963)
- Un par de sinvergüenzas (1963)
- El río de las ánimas (1964) as Leonardo Moncada
- La sombra de los hijos (1964) as Lauro
- Los Amores de Marieta - Los Fabulosos 20s (1964)
- Museo del horror (1964) as Luis
- Así amaron nuestros padres (1964)
- 'Campeón del barrio' (Su última canción) (1964) as Arturo
- El río de las ánimas (1964) as Leonardo Moncada
- Historia de un cobarde (1964, TV Series)
- Desencuentro (1964, TV Series)
- El Pecador (1965) as César Domínguez
- Cien gritos de terror (1965) as Julio (segment "Panico")
- Los tres calaveras (1965) as Miguel Bermejo
- La loba (1965) as Dr. Alejandro Bernstein
- El rescate (1965)
- Las tapatías nunca pierden (1965) as Manuel
- Esta noche no (1966) as Carlos Martínez
- El hijo del diablo (1966) as Víctor Rincón
- Sangre en el Bravo (1966) as Rafael
- Matar es fácil (1966) as Jorge Campos
- Estrategia matrimonio (1966) as Germán Andrade
- Dr. Satan (1966) as Dr. Satan
- Pánico (1966) (segment "Soledad")
- Mi caballo prieto rebelde (1967) as Valentín Romero
- Los tres mosqueteros de Dios (1967) as Padre Ignacio
- Un novio para dos hermanas (1967) as Rodolfo Cáceres / 'Mil Usos'
- Los hombres de Lupe Alvírez (1967)
- Seis Días para Morir (La Rabia) (1967) as Carlos Garibay
- Cómo pescar marido (1967) as Pablo
- El centauro Pancho Villa (1967) as Santos Patricio
- La Duda (1967, TV Series)
- Dr. Satán y la magia negra (1968) as Dr. Satan
- Requiem por un canalla (1968) as Jorge
- Las luchadoras vs el robot asesino (1969) as Arturo
- No juzgarás a tus padres (1969)
- El deseo llega de noche (1969) as Dr. Mario Lara
- El Libro De Piedra (1969) as Eugenio Ruvalcaba
- Una noche bajo la tormenta (1969)
- 24 horas de placer (1969) as Ruben
- La marcha de Zacatecas (1969) as Aparición especial (uncredited)
- Patsy, mi amor (1969) as Patsy's father
- Trampas de amor (1969) as Mauricio (segment "El dilema")
- Lío de faldas (1969) as Daniel
- La muñeca perversa (1969) as Ricardo Montenegro
- Los problemas de mamá (1970) as Lorenzo
- Una señora estupenda (1970) as Fernando
- El manantial del amor (1970) as Dr. Armando Suárez
- Dos esposas en mi cama (1970)
- Los años vacios (1970)
- Los corrompidos (1971) as Raúl
- Bajo el ardiente sol (1971)
- Papa en onda (1971) as Ricardo del Valle
- Una vez en la noche (1971)
- Las máscaras (1971, TV Series)
- El amor tiene cara de mujer (1971, TV Series)
- Me llaman Martina Sola (1972, TV Series)
- Eva y Dario (1973) as Papá de Dario
- ¿Quien? (1973, TV Series)
- La justicia tiene doce años (1973) as Vicente
- Ha llegado una intrusa (1974, TV Series) as Carlos Moran
- Fantoche (1977) as Augusto
- Cuchillo (1978) as Demonio Azul
- El Ardiente Secreto (1978) as Eduardo
- Te quiero (1979)
- J. J. Juez (1979, TV Series)
- Fieras contra fieras (1982)
- La voz de la tierra (1982, TV Series)
- La niña de los hoyitos (1984) as Alberto
- Perros salvajes (1984) as Marcos 'El Gitano'
- Eclipse (1984, TV Series) as Emmanuel
- Braceras y mojados (1984)
- El Cafre (1986) as Pedro Rojas
- Ratas de la ciudad (1986)
- Conexión criminal (1987)
- Como duele callar (1987, TV Series) as Rosendo Cisneros
- Amor en silencio (1987, TV Series) as Miguel
- Secta satanica (1990)
- Un rostro en mi pasado (1990, TV Series) as Armando Estrada
- A gozar, a gozar, que el mundo se va acabar (1990)
- Triste juventud (1990)
- Commando judicial (1990)
- Amor de nadie (1990-1991, TV Series) as Raúl
- Vacaciones de terror 2 (1991) as Roberto Mondragón
- Jóvenes perversos (1991) as Licenciado
- Baila conmigo (1993, TV Series) as German De La Reguera
- Los Parientes Pobres (1993, TV Series) as Evaristo Olmos
- La Pura (1994) as Bernardo
- Canción de amor (1996, TV Series) as Aníbal
- Reclusorio (1997) as Juez (segment 'La prostituta violada")
- El Sexenio de la muerte (1997) as Dr. Julian Bonaparte
- Por tu amor (1999, TV Series) as Lazaro Robledo
- Para matar al presidente (1999)
- Mi Destino Eres Tú (2000) as José Ignacio Rivadeneira Orendain
- Abrázame muy fuerte (2000) as Don Severiano Álvarez
- Carita de ángel (2000–2001) as Don Adolfo Valle
- Padres culpables (2001) as Ramon
- Entre el amor y el odio (2002) as Fernando Villareal
- ¡Vivan los niños! (2002–2003) as Don Joaquín Castillo
- Doble secuestro (2003) as Fernando Cortéz
- La Madrastra (2005) as Father Belisario
- Destilando Amor (2007) as Don Amador Montalvo
- Amor sin maquillaje (2007) as Himself
- Fuego en la sangre (2008) as Don Agustín Acevedo
- Los Inadaptados (2011) as Don Luis (final film role)
